= 1962 FIFA World Cup Group 2 =

Football tournament group stage

Group 2 of the 1962 FIFA World Cup took place from 30 May to 7 June 1962. The group consisted of Chile, Italy, Switzerland, and West Germany.

== Standings ==
Pos	Team	Pld	W	D	L	GF	GA	GR	Pts	Qualification
1	West Germany	3	2	1	0	4	1	4.000	5	Advance to knockout stage
2	Chile	3	2	0	1	5	3	1.667	4	Advance to knockout stage
3	Italy	3	1	1	1	3	2	1.500	3	
4	Switzerland	3	0	0	3	2	8	0.250	0	

Source: FIFA

== Matches ==
All times listed are local time.

=== Chile vs Switzerland ===
The game didn't start well for the hosts when in the sixth minute Rolf Wüthrich scored with a long-range shot taking advantage of a bad throw by Escuti. As Chileans increased the pressure after the goal Elsener had to make some fine saves. Contreras and Sánchez also hit the woodwork. Just before halftime the score was level when Sánchez's shot was deflected by Morf. Six minutes into the second half Jaime Ramírez put Chile ahead and soon after Leonel Sánchez scored his second goal and secured the victory for Chile.

30 May 1962
15:00 CLT (UTC-04)

Chile	3–1	Switzerland
L. Sánchez 44', 55'; Ramírez 51'		Wüthrich 6'

Estadio Nacional, Santiago
Attendance: 65,006
Referee: Kenneth Aston (England)

Chile
Switzerland

GK	1	Misael Escuti
RB	2	Luis Eyzaguirre
CB	5	Carlos Contreras
CB	3	Raúl Sánchez
LB	4	Sergio Navarro (c)
RH	8	Jorge Toro
LH	6	Eladio Rojas
OR	7	Jaime Ramírez
IR	9	Honorino Landa
IL	10	Alberto Fouilloux
OL	11	Leonel Sánchez
Manager:
Fernando Riera

GK	1	Karl Elsener
SW	5	Fritz Morf
RB	9	André Grobéty
CB	7	Heinz Schneiter
LB	8	Ely Tacchella
RH	21	Rolf Wüthrich
LH	13	Hans Weber
AM	17	Norbert Eschmann
RF	14	Anton Allemann
CF	15	Charles Antenen (c)
LF	18	Philippe Pottier
Manager:
Karl Rappan

=== West Germany vs Italy ===
This game saw not so many scoring chances for both sides. In the first half Uwe Seeler hit the bar, Albert Brülls and Omar Sívori also had their chances. In the second half the game became more physical and sometimes brutal but in the end defences overcame attacks and no goals were scored.

31 May 1962
15:00 CLT (UTC-04)

West Germany	0–0	Italy

Estadio Nacional, Santiago
Attendance: 65,440
Referee: Robert Holley Davidson (Scotland)

West Germany
Italy

GK	22	Wolfgang Fahrian
RB	12	Hans Nowak
CB	4	Willi Schulz
CB	2	Herbert Erhardt
LB	3	Karl-Heinz Schnellinger
RH	16	Hans Sturm
LH	6	Horst Szymaniak
RW	11	Hans Schäfer (c)
CF	9	Uwe Seeler
CF	8	Helmut Haller
LW	10	Albert Brülls
Manager:
Sepp Herberger

GK	1	Lorenzo Buffon (c)
RB	2	Giacomo Losi
CB	5	Cesare Maldini
CB	4	Sandro Salvadore
LB	16	Enzo Robotti
RH	21	Giorgio Ferrini
LH	3	Luigi Radice
RW	14	Gianni Rivera
CF	9	José Altafini
CF	10	Omar Sívori
LW	11	Giampaolo Menichelli
Manager:
Paolo Mazza

=== Chile vs Italy ===
The game was tough with much foul play. After only seven minutes Ferrini was sent off for kicking Landa and the game had to be interrupted for another eight minutes until the police escorted the Italian out of the field. Soon afterwards Leonel Sánchez responded to a series of kicks from Mario David by knocking him down with a punch in front of the linesman. The referee did nothing so David took revenge on Sánchez before halftime and was also sent off. Italians held out in the second half until Jaime Ramírez headed the ball into the net over two defenders after Sánchez's shot was punched away by Carlo Mattrel. In the last minutes Jorge Toro secured the Chilean victory with a long-range shot.

2 June 1962
15:00 CLT (UTC-04)

Chile	2–0	Italy
Ramírez 73'; Toro 87'

Estadio Nacional, Santiago
Attendance: 66,057
Referee: Kenneth Aston (England)

Chile
Italy

GK	1	Misael Escuti
RB	2	Luis Eyzaguirre
CB	5	Carlos Contreras
CB	3	Raúl Sánchez
LB	4	Sergio Navarro (c)
RH	8	Jorge Toro
LH	6	Eladio Rojas
OR	7	Jaime Ramírez
IR	9	Honorino Landa
IL	10	Alberto Fouilloux
OL	11	Leonel Sánchez
Manager:
Fernando Riera

GK	12	Carlo Mattrel
RB	18	Mario David	(red card) 41'
CB	19	Francesco Janich
CB	4	Sandro Salvadore
LB	16	Enzo Robotti
RH	20	Paride Tumburus
LH	21	Giorgio Ferrini	(red card) 8'
OR	7	Bruno Mora (c)
IR	9	José Altafini
IL	8	Humberto Maschio
OL	11	Giampaolo Menichelli
Manager:
Paolo Mazza

Linesmen:
Leo Goldstein (Israel)
Fernando Buergo Elcuaz (Mexico)

=== West Germany vs Switzerland ===
Switzerland were left with just 10 men early in the game when Norbert Eschmann suffered an ankle injury after a sliding tackle by Horst Szymaniak. Albert Brülls scored the first goal just before halftime with a low shot into the far corner. Fourteen minutes into the second half Uwe Seeler got a long pass from Hans Schäfer and beat the Swiss goalkeeper for the second time. Switzerland could answer only with a Schneiter goal after a corner At the end of the game Brülls had another good chance but his first shot was parried by the goalkeeper and his second shot was cleared off the line by Schneiter.

3 June 1962
15:00 CLT (UTC-04)

West Germany	2–1	Switzerland
Brülls 45'; Seeler 59'		Schneiter 73'

Estadio Nacional, Santiago
Attendance: 64,922
Referee: Leo Horn (Netherlands)

West Germany
Switzerland

GK	22	Wolfgang Fahrian
RB	12	Hans Nowak
CB	4	Willi Schulz
CB	2	Herbert Erhardt
LB	3	Karl-Heinz Schnellinger
RH	7	Willi Koslowski
LH	6	Horst Szymaniak
OR	11	Hans Schäfer (c)
IR	9	Uwe Seeler
IL	8	Helmut Haller
OL	10	Albert Brülls
Manager:
Sepp Herberger

GK	1	Karl Elsener
RB	9	André Grobéty
CB	7	Heinz Schneiter
LB	8	Ely Tacchella
RH	21	Rolf Wüthrich
LH	13	Hans Weber
OR	15	Charles Antenen (c)
IR	17	Norbert Eschmann
CF	20	Roger Vonlanthen
IL	16	Richard Dürr
OL	14	Anton Allemann
Manager:
Karl Rappan

=== West Germany vs Chile ===
6 June 1962
15:00 CLT (UTC-04)

West Germany	2–0	Chile
Szymaniak 21' (pen.); Seeler 82'

Estadio Nacional, Santiago
Attendance: 67,224
Referee: Robert Holley Davidson (Scotland)

West Germany
Chile

GK	22	Wolfgang Fahrian
RB	12	Hans Nowak
CB	4	Willi Schulz
CB	2	Herbert Erhardt
LB	3	Karl-Heinz Schnellinger
DM	6	Horst Szymaniak
RH	15	Willi Giesemann
LH	10	Albert Brülls
RF	17	Engelbert Kraus
CF	9	Uwe Seeler
LF	11	Hans Schäfer (c)
Manager:
Sepp Herberger

GK	1	Misael Escuti
RB	2	Luis Eyzaguirre
CB	5	Carlos Contreras
CB	3	Raúl Sánchez
LB	4	Sergio Navarro (c)
RH	18	Mario Moreno
LH	6	Eladio Rojas
OR	7	Jaime Ramírez
CF	9	Honorino Landa
CF	21	Armando Tobar
OL	11	Leonel Sánchez
Manager:
Fernando Riera

=== Italy vs Switzerland ===
Almost as soon as the game started Bruno Mora opened the score after Elsener deflected a crossshot by Pascutti. In the second half Giacomo Bulgarelli, a new member of the team, scored two consecutive goals thus securing Italy's victory, though it was unable to prevent an early Italian elimination.

7 June 1962
15:00 CLT (UTC-04)

Italy	3–0	Switzerland
Mora 2'; Bulgarelli 65', 67'

Estadio Nacional, Santiago
Attendance: 59,828
Referee: Nikolay Latyshev (Soviet Union)

Italy
Switzerland

GK	1	Lorenzo Buffon (c)
RB	2	Giacomo Losi
CB	5	Cesare Maldini
CB	4	Sandro Salvadore
LB	16	Enzo Robotti
DM	3	Luigi Radice
RH	22	Giacomo Bulgarelli
LH	10	Omar Sívori
RF	7	Bruno Mora
CF	15	Angelo Sormani
LF	17	Ezio Pascutti
Manager:
Paolo Mazza

GK	1	Karl Elsener
RB	9	André Grobéty
CB	7	Heinz Schneiter
LB	8	Ely Tacchella
RH	21	Rolf Wüthrich
LH	13	Hans Weber
OR	15	Charles Antenen (c)
IR	11	Eugen Meier
CF	20	Roger Vonlanthen
IL	16	Richard Dürr
OL	14	Anton Allemann
Manager:
Karl Rappan

== See also ==
- Chile at the FIFA World Cup
- Germany at the FIFA World Cup
- Italy at the FIFA World Cup
- Switzerland at the FIFA World Cup
