= 1962 FIFA World Cup knockout stage =

Stage of the football World Cup

The knockout stage of the 1962 FIFA World Cup was the second and final stage of the competition, following the group stage. The knockout stage began on 10 June with the quarter-finals and ended on 17 June 1962 with the final match, held at the Estadio Nacional in Santiago. The top two teams from each group (eight in total) advanced to the knockout stage to compete in a single-elimination style tournament. A match for third place also was played between the two losing teams of the semi-finals.

Brazil won the final 3–1 against Czechoslovakia for their second World Cup title.

== Qualified teams ==
The top two placed teams from each of the four groups qualified for the knockout stage.

Group	Winners	Runners-up
1	Soviet Union	Yugoslavia
2	West Germany	Chile
3	Brazil	Czechoslovakia
4	Hungary	England

== Bracket ==
Quarter-finals
10 June – Arica
Soviet Union	1
Chile	2
10 June – Viña del Mar
Brazil	3
England	1
10 June – Santiago
West Germany	0
Yugoslavia	1
10 June – Rancagua
Hungary	0
Czechoslovakia	1

Semi-finals
13 June – Santiago
Chile	2
Brazil	4
13 June – Viña del Mar
Yugoslavia	1
Czechoslovakia	3

Final
17 June – Santiago
Brazil	3
Czechoslovakia	1
Match for third place
16 June – Santiago
Chile	1
Yugoslavia	0

== Quarter-finals ==
=== Chile vs Soviet Union ===
Eleven minutes into the game Leonel Sánchez opened the score with a free kick from wide on the right that surprised Lev Yashin at the near post. Igor Chislenko equalized for the Soviet Union after picking up a deflected shot by Viktor Ponedelnik but almost immediately Eladio Rojas scored with an excellent low shot from distance. Chile managed to hold on to the result.

10 June 1962
14:30 CLT (UTC-04)

Chile	2–1	Soviet Union
L. Sánchez 11'; Rojas 29'		Chislenko 26'

Estadio Carlos Dittborn, Arica
Attendance: 17,268
Referee: Leo Horn (Netherlands)

Chile

Soviet Union

GK	1	Misael Escuti
RB	2	Luis Eyzaguirre
CB	5	Carlos Contreras
CB	3	Raúl Sánchez
LB	4	Sergio Navarro (c)
RH	8	Jorge Toro
LH	6	Eladio Rojas
OR	7	Jaime Ramírez
IR	9	Honorino Landa
IL	21	Armando Tobar
OL	11	Leonel Sánchez
Manager:
Fernando Riera

GK	1	Lev Yashin
RB	5	Givi Chokheli
CB	7	Anatoli Maslyonkin
LB	6	Leonīds Ostrovskis
RH	12	Valery Voronin
LH	10	Igor Netto (c)
OR	22	Igor Chislenko
IR	14	Valentin Ivanov
CF	19	Viktor Ponedelnik
IL	16	Aleksei Mamykin
OL	17	Mikheil Meskhi
Manager:
Gavriil Kachalin

=== Czechoslovakia vs Hungary ===
In the first half a through-ball from Masopust cut out the Hungarian defense for Scherer to score. After that Schrojf made several saves to deny a Hungarian goal. Tichy once hit the bar but couldn't score.

10 June 1962
14:30 CLT (UTC-04)

Czechoslovakia	1–0	Hungary
Scherer 13'

Estadio El Teniente, Rancagua
Attendance: 11,690
Referee: Nikolay Latyshev (Soviet Union)

Czechoslovakia

Hungary

GK	1	Viliam Schrojf
RB	2	Jan Lála
CB	5	Svatopluk Pluskal
CB	3	Ján Popluhár
LB	4	Ladislav Novák (c)
RH	19	Andrej Kvašňák
LH	6	Josef Masopust
OR	17	Tomáš Pospíchal
IR	8	Adolf Scherer
IL	18	Josef Kadraba
OL	11	Josef Jelínek
Manager:
Rudolf Vytlačil

GK	1	Gyula Grosics (c)
RB	2	Sándor Mátrai
CB	3	Kálmán Mészöly
LB	4	László Sárosi
RH	5	Ernő Solymosi
LH	6	Ferenc Sipos
OR	7	Károly Sándor
IR	17	Gyula Rákosi
CF	9	Flórián Albert
IL	10	Lajos Tichy
OL	11	Máté Fenyvesi
Manager:
Lajos Baróti

=== Brazil vs England ===
Garrincha opened the score at the half hour when he headed in a corner by Mário Zagallo. England equalized when Jimmy Greaves hit the bar with a looping header and Gerry Hitchens banged in an instant shot. Soon after halftime Brazil regained advantage after Vavá headed in a free kick from Garrincha and six minutes later the Brazilian right winger made it 3–1 with a curling shot into the top corner.

10 June 1962
14:30 CLT (UTC-04)

Brazil	3–1	England
Garrincha 31', 59'; Vavá 53'		Hitchens 38'

Estadio Sausalito, Viña del Mar
Attendance: 17,736
Referee: Pierre Schwinte (France)

Brazil

England

GK	1	Gilmar
RB	2	Djalma Santos
CB	3	Mauro Ramos (c)
CB	5	Zózimo
LB	6	Nílton Santos
RH	4	Zito
LH	8	Didi
OR	7	Garrincha
CF	19	Vavá
CF	20	Amarildo
OL	21	Mário Zagallo
Manager:
Aymoré Moreira

GK	1	Ron Springett
RB	2	Jimmy Armfield
LB	3	Ray Wilson
RH	16	Bobby Moore
CH	15	Maurice Norman
LH	6	Ron Flowers
OR	17	Bryan Douglas
IR	8	Jimmy Greaves
CF	9	Gerry Hitchens
IL	10	Johnny Haynes (c)
OL	11	Bobby Charlton
Manager:
Walter Winterbottom

=== Yugoslavia vs West Germany ===
The first clear opportunity was for the Germans when Seeler hit the post with a low shot after running onto Haller's pass. Yugoslavia were also close to score but Schnellinger cleared the ball off the line following a corner. The only goal of the game came near the end when Galić pulled the ball back after working his way to the goal line and Radaković lashed it high into the net.

10 June 1962
14:30 CLT (UTC-04)

Yugoslavia	1–0	West Germany
Radaković 85'

Estadio Nacional, Santiago
Attendance: 63,324
Referee: Arturo Yamasaki Maldonado (Peru)

Yugoslavia

West Germany

GK	1	Milutin Šoškić
RB	2	Vladimir Durković
CB	5	Vlatko Marković
LB	3	Fahrudin Jusufi
RH	4	Petar Radaković
LH	6	Vladica Popović
OR	18	Vladica Kovačević
IR	8	Dragoslav Šekularac
CF	9	Dražan Jerković
IL	10	Milan Galić (c)
OL	11	Josip Skoblar
Co-managers:
Ljubomir Lovrić & Prvoslav Mihajlović

GK	22	Wolfgang Fahrian
RB	12	Hans Nowak
CB	4	Willi Schulz
CB	2	Herbert Erhardt
LB	3	Karl-Heinz Schnellinger
RH	6	Horst Szymaniak
LH	15	Willi Giesemann
OR	10	Albert Brülls
CF	8	Helmut Haller
CF	9	Uwe Seeler
OL	11	Hans Schäfer (c)
Manager:
Sepp Herberger

== Semi-finals ==
=== Czechoslovakia vs Yugoslavia ===
13 June 1962
14:30 CLT (UTC-04)

Czechoslovakia	3–1	Yugoslavia
Kadraba 48'; Scherer 80', 84' (pen.)		Jerković 69'

Estadio Sausalito, Viña del Mar
Attendance: 5,890
Referee: Gottfried Dienst (Switzerland)

Czechoslovakia

Yugoslavia

GK	1	Viliam Schrojf
RB	2	Jan Lála
CB	5	Svatopluk Pluskal
CB	3	Ján Popluhár
LB	4	Ladislav Novák (c)
RH	19	Andrej Kvašňák
LH	6	Josef Masopust
OR	17	Tomáš Pospíchal
IR	8	Adolf Scherer
IL	18	Josef Kadraba
OL	11	Josef Jelínek
Manager:
Rudolf Vytlačil

GK	1	Milutin Šoškić
RB	2	Vladimir Durković
CB	5	Vlatko Marković
LB	3	Fahrudin Jusufi
RH	4	Petar Radaković
LH	6	Vladica Popović
OR	14	Vasilije Šijaković
IR	8	Dragoslav Šekularac
CF	9	Dražan Jerković
IL	10	Milan Galić (c)
OL	11	Josip Skoblar
Co-managers:
Ljubomir Lovrić & Prvoslav Mihajlović

=== Brazil vs Chile ===
13 June 1962
14:30 CLT (UTC-04)

Brazil	4–2	Chile
Garrincha 9', 32'; Vavá 47', 78'		Toro 42'; L. Sánchez 61' (pen.)

Estadio Nacional, Santiago
Attendance: 76,594
Referee: Arturo Yamasaki Maldonado (Peru)

Brazil

Chile

GK	1	Gilmar
RB	2	Djalma Santos
CB	3	Mauro Ramos (c)
CB	5	Zózimo
LB	6	Nílton Santos
RH	4	Zito
LH	8	Didi
OR	7	Garrincha	(red card) 83'
OL	21	Mário Zagallo
CF	19	Vavá
CF	20	Amarildo
Manager:
Aymoré Moreira

GK	1	Misael Escuti
RB	2	Luis Eyzaguirre
CB	5	Carlos Contreras
CB	3	Raúl Sánchez
LB	15	Manuel Rodríguez
RH	8	Jorge Toro (c)
LH	6	Eladio Rojas
OR	7	Jaime Ramírez
IR	9	Honorino Landa	(red card) 80'
IL	21	Armando Tobar
OL	11	Leonel Sánchez
Manager:
Fernando Riera

== Match for third place ==
16 June 1962
14:30 CLT (UTC-04)

Chile	1–0	Yugoslavia
Rojas 90'

Estadio Nacional, Santiago
Attendance: 66,697
Referee: Juan Gardeazábal Garay (Spain)

Chile

Yugoslavia

GK	12	Adán Godoy
RB	2	Luis Eyzaguirre
CB	16	Humberto Cruz
CB	3	Raúl Sánchez
LB	15	Manuel Rodríguez
RH	8	Jorge Toro (c)
LH	6	Eladio Rojas
OR	7	Jaime Ramírez
IR	20	Carlos Campos
IL	21	Armando Tobar
OL	11	Leonel Sánchez
Manager:
Fernando Riera

GK	1	Milutin Šoškić
RB	2	Vladimir Durković
CB	5	Vlatko Marković
LB	13	Slavko Svinjarević
RH	4	Petar Radaković
LH	6	Vladica Popović
OR	18	Vladica Kovačević
IR	8	Dragoslav Šekularac
CF	9	Dražan Jerković
IL	10	Milan Galić (c)
OL	11	Josip Skoblar
Co-managers:
Ljubomir Lovrić & Prvoslav Mihajlović

== Final ==
17 June 1962
14:30 CLT (UTC-04)

Brazil	3–1	Czechoslovakia
Amarildo 17'; Zito 69'; Vavá 78'		Masopust 15'

Estadio Nacional, Santiago
Attendance: 68,679
Referee: Nikolay Latyshev (Soviet Union)

Brazil	Czechoslovakia

GK	1	Gilmar
RB	2	Djalma Santos
CB	3	Mauro Ramos (c)
CB	5	Zózimo
LB	6	Nílton Santos
RH	4	Zito
LH	8	Didi
OR	7	Garrincha
OL	21	Mário Zagallo
CF	19	Vavá
CF	20	Amarildo
Manager:
Aymoré Moreira

GK	1	Viliam Schrojf
RB	12	Jiří Tichý
CB	5	Svatopluk Pluskal
CB	3	Ján Popluhár
LB	4	Ladislav Novák (c)
RH	19	Andrej Kvašňák
LH	6	Josef Masopust
OR	17	Tomáš Pospíchal
IR	8	Adolf Scherer
IL	18	Josef Kadraba
OL	11	Josef Jelínek
Manager:
Rudolf Vytlačil

Assistant referees:
Leo Horn (Netherlands)
Bobby Davidson (Scotland)
