= Battle of Santiago (1962 FIFA World Cup) =

Football match known for violence level

1962 FIFA World Cup Group 2
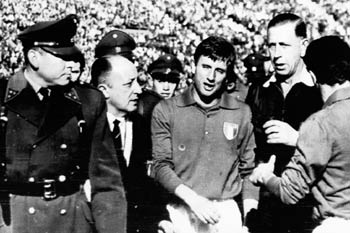
- Italy's Giorgio Ferrini being removed from the pitch by Carabineros de Chile policemen
Chile	Italy
(Chile)	(Italy)
2	0
- Date: 2 June 1962
- Venue: Estadio Nacional, Santiago de Chile
- Referee: Ken Aston (England)
- Attendance: 66,057

The Battle of Santiago (Italian: Battaglia di Santiago; Spanish: Batalla de Santiago) was a football match during the 1962 FIFA World Cup, played between the hosts Chile and Italy on 2 June 1962 in Santiago. It gained its nickname from the level of violence seen in the game, in which two players were sent off, numerous punches were thrown and police intervention was required four times. The referee was Ken Aston, who later went on to invent yellow and red cards.

== Background ==
In this Group B clash, already heightened tensions between the two football teams were exacerbated by the description of Santiago in crude terms by two Italian journalists, Antonio Ghirelli and Corrado Pizzinelli; they had written that Santiago was a backwater dump where "the phones don't work, taxis are as rare as faithful husbands, a cable to Europe costs an arm and a leg and a letter takes five days to turn up", and its population prone to "malnutrition, illiteracy, alcoholism and poverty. Chile is a small, proud and poor country: it has agreed to organise this World Cup in the same way as Mussolini agreed to send our air force to bomb London (they didn't arrive). The capital city has 700 hotel beds. Entire neighbourhoods are given over to open prostitution. This country and its people are proudly miserable and backwards." Chilean newspapers fired back, describing Italians in general as fascists, mafiosos, oversexed, and, because some of Inter Milan's players had recently been involved in a doping scandal, drug addicts. The Italian journalists involved were forced to flee Chile, while an Argentinian scribe mistaken for an Italian in a Santiago bar was beaten up and hospitalised.

Chile's organisation of and preparation for the tournament had been severely disrupted by the 1960 Valdivia earthquake, the strongest earthquake ever recorded in human history. Articles in the Italian papers La Nazione and Corriere della Sera were saying that allowing Chile to host the World Cup was "pure madness"; this was used and magnified by local newspapers to inflame the Chilean population. The British newspaper the Daily Express wrote "The tournament shows every sign of developing into a violent bloodbath. Reports read like battlefront despatches. Italy vs Germany was described as 'wrestling and warfare.'"

== Match ==
=== Summary ===
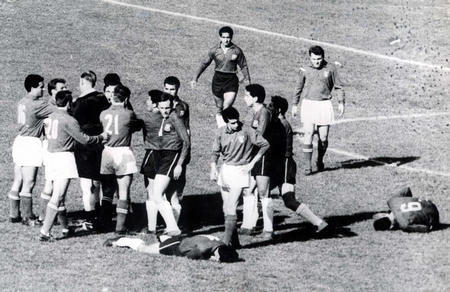
One of the countless disputes between the Italian footballers and the referee Aston

The first foul occurred within 35 seconds of kick-off. Italy's Giorgio Ferrini was sent off in the eighth minute after a foul on Honorino Landa, but refused to leave the pitch and had to be dragged off by policemen. In the ensuing scramble, Chilean outside-left Leonel Sánchez broke Humberto Maschio's nose with a left hook punch, but English referee Ken Aston did not notice the foul as he was busy telling Ferrini to leave the field. In the 38th minute of the first half, Sánchez slapped Italian right-back Mario David in the face, in retaliation for being fouled seconds earlier. Although the linesman was only a few metres away, Sánchez escaped punishment again. When David attempted to kick Sánchez in the head a few minutes later, he was sent off. The two teams engaged in scuffles and spitting, and police had to intervene three more times.

Chile won the match 2–0, with a headed goal from Jaime Ramírez and a low long-range shot from Jorge Toro, both in the last 16 minutes.

Aston, who had now refereed both of Chile's matches, never oversaw a World Cup match again, becoming a senior member of the refereeing committees of the 1966 and 1970 championships.

In his work The Complete Book of the World Cup (Harper Sport), Cris Freddi described the match as "…a horror show, the last of the three great World Cup slugfests." On the same day, Yugoslavia beat Uruguay 3–1 with both teams having a player sent off – Vladimir Popović and Ángel Rubén Cabrera – and Freddi wrote of their opening match against Switzerland: "Chile responded [to conceding an early goal] with some grim tackling, a feature of this World Cup. Aston booked Eschmann then Rojas but should have sent both off when they came to blows a few minutes later."

=== Details ===
2 June 1962
15:00 CLT (UTC-04)

Chile	2–0	Italy
Ramírez 73'; Toro 87'

Estadio Nacional, Santiago
Attendance: 66,057
Referee: Kenneth Aston (England)

Chile
Italy

GK	1	Misael Escuti
RB	2	Luis Eyzaguirre
CB	5	Carlos Contreras
CB	3	Raúl Sánchez
LB	4	Sergio Navarro (c)
RH	8	Jorge Toro
LH	6	Eladio Rojas
OR	7	Jaime Ramírez
IR	9	Honorino Landa
IL	10	Alberto Fouilloux
OL	11	Leonel Sánchez
Manager:
Fernando Riera

GK	12	Carlo Mattrel
RB	18	Mario David	(red card) 41'
CB	19	Francesco Janich
CB	4	Sandro Salvadore
LB	16	Enzo Robotti
RH	20	Paride Tumburus
LH	21	Giorgio Ferrini	(red card) 8'
OR	7	Bruno Mora (c)
IR	9	José Altafini
IL	8	Humberto Maschio
OL	11	Giampaolo Menichelli
Manager:
Paolo Mazza

Linesmen:
Leo Goldstein (Israel)
Fernando Buergo Elcuaz (Mexico)

== Aftermath ==
When highlights from the match were shown on British television a couple of days later (not the same night, because film of matches had to be flown back to the UK), the match was introduced by BBC sports commentator David Coleman as "the most stupid, appalling, disgusting and disgraceful exhibition of football, possibly in the history of the game."

Coleman also observed that it was the first meeting between the sides and "we hope it will be the last." However, the sides were drawn together at the 1966 World Cup and met at Sunderland's Roker Park ground with Italy winning 2–0. The rematch also featured unsportsmanlike play but to a lesser degree.

== See also ==
- Battle of Berne
- Battle of Bordeaux
- Battle of Nuremberg
- Football War
- Chile at the FIFA World Cup
- Italy at the FIFA World Cup
