= Elsener =

Elsener is a surname. Notable people with the surname include:

- Karl Elsener (inventor) (1860–1918), inventor of the Swiss Army knife
- Karl Elsener (footballer) (born 1934), retired Swiss football goalkeeper
- Patsy Elsener (born 1929), American diver who competed in the 1948 Summer Olympics
- Ramona Elsener (born 1992), Swiss ice dancer
- Rudolf Elsener (born 1953), retired Swiss football striker
