= Aníbal Ramírez =

Chilean footballer (1903-1962)

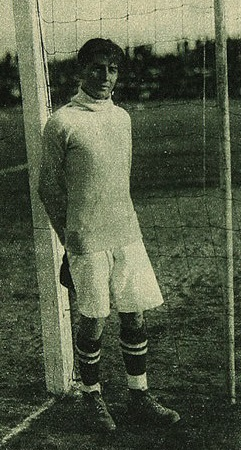

Personal information
- Full name: Eliceo Aníbal Ramírez Vargas
- Date of birth: 27 September 1903
- Date of death: 14 June 1962 (aged 58)
- Position: Goalkeeper

Senior career*
Years	Team	Apps	(Gls)
- Gold Cross

International career
1924	Chile	2	(0)
- * Club domestic league appearances and goals

Eliceo Aníbal Ramírez Vargas (27 September 1903 – 14 June 1962), known as Aníbal Ramírez, was a Chilean footballer who played as a goalkeeper.

== Career ==
He played in two matches for the Chile national football team in 1924, while he was a player of Gold Cross, a club based in Valparaíso. He was also part of Chile's squad for the 1924 South American Championship.

== Personal life ==
He was the father of Jaime Ramírez, a Chile international forward who took part in the 1962 FIFA World Cup.
