= Ely Tacchella =

Swiss footballer (1936–2017)

Personal information
- Full name: Ely Tacchella
- Date of birth: 25 May 1936
- Place of birth: Neuchâtel, Switzerland
- Date of death: 2 August 2017 (aged 81)

International career
Years	Team	Apps	(Gls)
- Switzerland

Ely Tacchella (25 May 1936 – 2 August 2017) was a Swiss footballer.

He got 42 caps for Switzerland, playing all three games at the 1962 World Cup as well as in Switzerland's 0–5 loss to West Germany at the 1966 World Cup.
