= Luis Eyzaguirre =

Chilean footballer (born 1939)

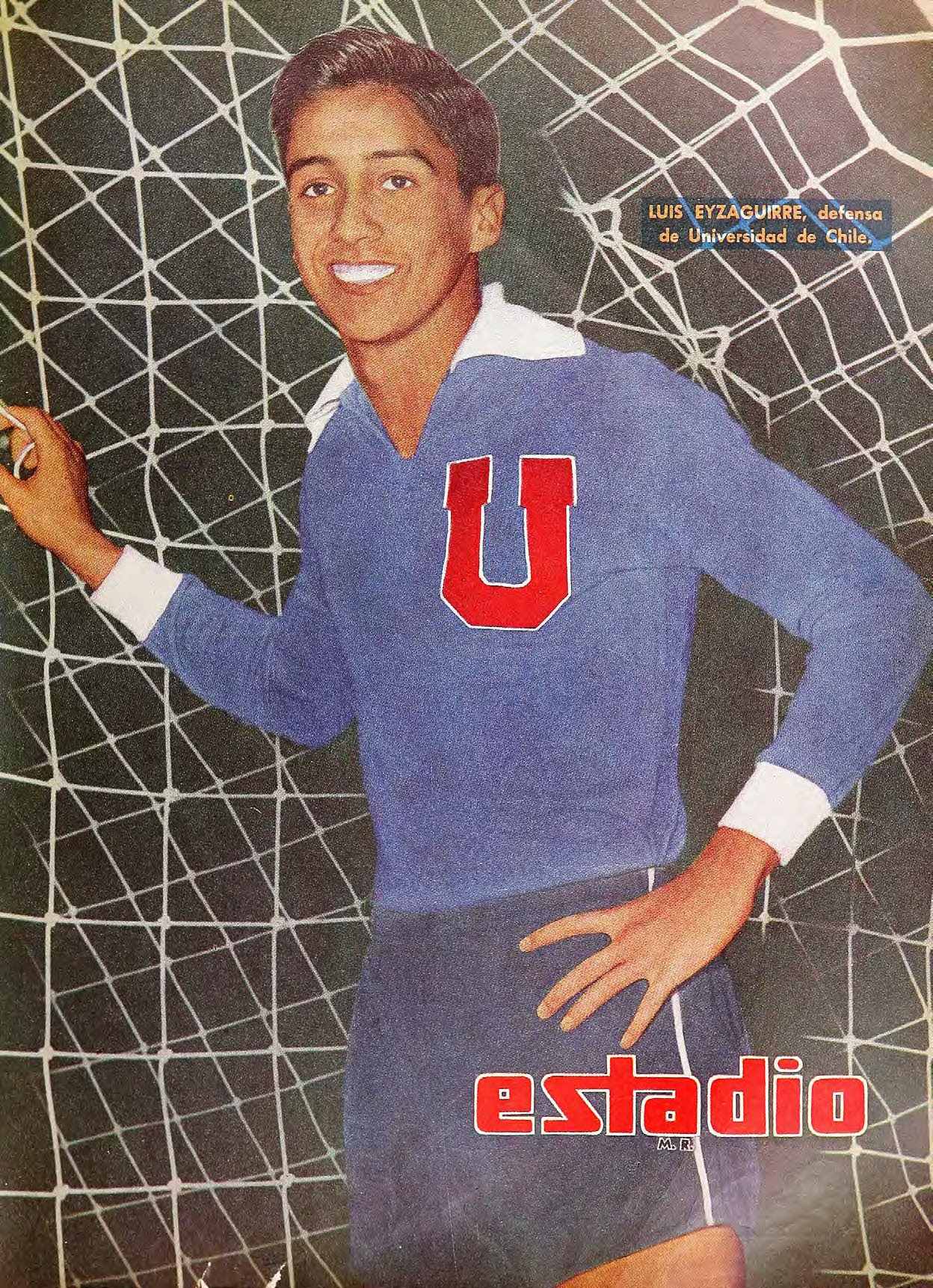
- Eyzaguirre in 1960

Personal information
- Full name: Luis Armando Eyzaguirre Silva
- Date of birth: 22 June 1939 (age 87)
- Place of birth: Santiago, Chile
- Height: 1.69 m (5 ft 7 in)
- Position: Right-back

Youth career
- Igualdad y Trabajo
- Banfield de Yungay
- Deportivo Bulnes
- 1956–1957: Universidad de Chile

Senior career*
Years	Team	Apps	(Gls)
1958-1967	Universidad de Chile	230	(25)
1968–1971	Huachipato	123	(2)
1972–1973	Ferroviarios		

International career
1958	Chile U20		
1959–1966	Chile	70	(3)
Medal record
Men's football
Representing Chile
FIFA World Cup
Third place	1962 Chile
- * Club domestic league appearances and goals

Luis Armando Eyzaguirre Silva (born 22 June 1939), also known as Fifo, is a former Chilean football player.

== Career ==
Eyzaguirre played as a right-back in the Universidad de Chile football team known as the Ballet Azul, with which he won five national championships. After, he spent four seasons with Huachipato (1968–1971) and ended his career with Ferroviarios in the Chilean second division.

On 6 April 1965, Eyzaguirre was one of the constituent footballers of SIFUP, the trade union of professionales footballers in Chile, alongside fellows such as Pedro Araya, Manuel Astorga, Juan Rodríguez Vega, among others.

At international level, Eyzaguirre represented Chile at under-20 level in the 1958 South American Championship under Fernando Riera. At senior level, he played in 1959 Copa América and in the FIFA World Cup he achieved third place with the Chilean national selection for the 1962 FIFA World Cup and was one of the players involved in the Battle of Santiago incident during the Group 2 match between Chile and Italy. He played one match in the 1966 FIFA World Cup. He was considered one of the best right back of his time, next to the Brazilian Djalma Santos. He played 39 matches for his country between 1959 and 1966. He was one of the players invited by FIFA to play in a commemorative game celebrating the centennial anniversary of football.

== Honors ==
- Chilean League: (5)
  - 1959, 1962, 1964, 1965, 1967
