= Wolfgang Fahrian =

German footballer (1941–2022)

Personal information
- Date of birth: 31 May 1941
- Place of birth: Klingenstein (now Blaustein), Württemberg, Germany
- Date of death: 12 April 2022 (aged 80)
- Position: Goalkeeper

Youth career
- TuS Klingenstein
- TSG Ulm 1846

Senior career*
Years	Team	Apps	(Gls)
1960–1964	TSG Ulm 1846^{(at times OL Süd)}		
1964–1966	Hertha BSC	25	(0)
1966–1967	1860 Munich	8	(0)
1967–1969	Fortuna Düsseldorf		
1969–1976	Fortuna Köln	85	(0)

International career
1962–1964	West Germany	10	(0)
- * Club domestic league appearances and goals

Wolfgang Fahrian (31 May 1941 – 12 April 2022) was a German professional footballer who played as a goalkeeper.

== Playing career ==
Having been a defender initially, Fahrian was trained as a goalkeeper following a goalkeeper shortage at TSG Ulm 1846 in the early 1960s. Although impressive in his new role, his call-up by Sepp Herberger for the West Germany national team clash against Uruguay in April 1962 caused a great stir due to the fact he was not a top-division player at that time. In the fixture he kept a clean sheet, something that saw him brought into West Germany's 1962 FIFA World Cup squad. Despite his first cap seeing an impressive performance, it was expected that Hans Tilkowski would be the undoubted first choice for Herberger's West Germany side and Fahrian would just be taken as a reserve goalkeeper. However, Fahrian shocked Germany as he was chosen to be the starting goalkeeper for all the matches in this World Cup.

However, the 1962 FIFA World Cup brought disappointing results for West Germany, reaching the Quarter-final stage, which coincided with Fahrian's faltering career from then on. Several moves later, he retired after just 67 appearances in the Bundesliga. He played for the West Germany national team until 1964, earning ten caps.

== Career as a sports agent ==
Fahrian became a sports agent at the end of his career, finding great success in that area. In 2006, he worked as executive for ROGON Sportmanagement, one of the leading agencies in German football with clients such as Kevin Kurányi, Marcelo Bordon, Fabian Ernst, Halil Altıntop, Tim Wiese, Roque Junior and others.

== Death ==
Fahrian died from pneumonia on 12 April 2022, aged 80.

== Honours ==
TSV 1860 Munich

- Bundesliga runner-up: 1966–67
