= Karl Elsener (footballer) =

Swiss footballer (1934-2010)

Personal information
- Full name: Karl Elsener
- Date of birth: 13 August 1934
- Place of birth: Switzerland
- Date of death: 27 July 2010 (aged 75)

International career
Years	Team	Apps	(Gls)
- Switzerland

Karl Elsener (13 August 1934 in Bülach – 27 July 2010) was a Swiss footballer who played as a goalkeeper. He played for FC Aarau, Grasshopper Club Zürich and Lausanne Sports during his club career. He earned 34 caps for the Switzerland national football team from 1958 to 1966, and participated in the 1962 FIFA World Cup and the 1966 FIFA World Cup.
