= Willi Giesemann =

German footballer (1937–2024)

Personal information
- Full name: Wilhelm Giesemann
- Date of birth: 2 September 1937
- Place of birth: Rühme, Gau Southern Hanover-Brunswick, Germany
- Date of death: 4 October 2024 (aged 87)
- Position: Half-back

Youth career
- TSV Sülfeld
- VfL Wolfsburg

Senior career*
Years	Team	Apps	(Gls)
1956–1959	VfL Wolfsburg ^{OL Nord}		
1959–1963	Bayern Munich ^{OL Süd}		
1963–1968	Hamburger SV	104	(13)
1968–1972	HSV Barmbek-Uhlenhorst		

International career
1960–1965	West Germany	14	(0)
- * Club domestic league appearances and goals

Wilhelm Giesemann (2 September 1937 – 4 October 2024) was a German footballer who played as a half-back.

== Club career ==
After the introduction of the Bundesliga in 1963, Giesemann appeared in 104 top-flight matches for Hamburger SV.

== International career ==
Giesemann was part of the West Germany squad at the 1962 FIFA World Cup and played in two West German matches there.

He did miss out on participation at the then forthcoming World Cup because of injury, an injury that had an effect on the duration of his ability to play top-level football in the latter stages of his career, but sustained his toughest injury just on the day of his fourteenth and last West Germany appearance. On 6 June 1965, the West Germans played Brazil in Rio and battled hard to withstand the likes of Garrincha, Ademir and Pelé. Brazil was still in the lead, shortly before the end of the match when a tackle of Pelé saw marker Giesemann go off with a broken shinbone. And, it happened to be the famous Brazilian striker who netted the decisive second goal shortly thereafter. Overall he won 14 caps.

== Death ==
Giesemann died on 4 October 2024, at the age of 87.
