= Arturo Yamasaki =

Peruvian-Mexican football referee (1929–2013)

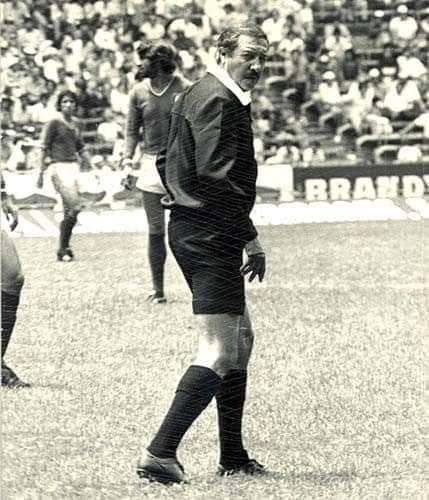
- Full name: Arturo Maximo Yamasaki Maldonado
- Born: 11 May 1929; Lima, Lima Province, Peru
- Died: 23 July 2013 (aged 84); Mexico City, Mexico

International
| Years | League | Role |
| 1961–1974 | FIFA | Referee |

Arturo Maximo Yamasaki Maldonado (11 May 1929 – 23 July 2013), also known as Arturo Yamasaki, was a Peruvian-Mexican international football referee. He represented the Peruvian Football Association from 1960 to 1966, then he emigrated to Mexico, where he also took citizenship and represented Mexico Football Association until end of his referee career.

== Career ==
Yamasaki was FIFA referee in 1961–1974 and officiated totally 31 international matches. He refereed 5 matches in three World Cups 1962 (3), 1966 (1) and 1970 (1). He also officiated 3 matches in World Cup qualifying (CONCACAF zone) 1962 (1) and 1970 (2). He was referee of 1963 Copa America in 6 matches and officiated 2 matches in Copa America 1967 qualifying. He also officiated 2 matches in 1968 Olympic Games. He also attributed 8 international friendly matches in 1960–73.

Below his World Cup matches that officiated:

| Date | Match | Team1 | Score | Score | Team2 |
|---|---|---|---|---|---|
| 06.06.1962 | WC 1962 Group | Argentina | 0 | 0 | Hungary |
| 10.06.1962 | WC 1962 Quarter final | Germany | 0 | 1 | Yugoslavia |
| 13.06.1962 | WC 1962 Semi final | Brazil | 4 | 2 | Chile |
| 20.07.1966 | WC 1966 Group | England | 2 | 0 | France |
| 17.06.1970 | WC 1970 Semi final | Germany | 3 | 4 | Italy |

Yamasaki sent off two players in the 1962 World Cup quarter final match between Yugoslavia and West Germany, and more famously, Garrincha in the semifinal between Brazil and hosts Chile; however, Garrincha was allowed to play the final because Yamasaki did not remain in Chile long enough to uphold the one-match ban on the Brazilian. About Game of Century according to some German players, Yamasaki favored the Italians and German player Uwe Seeler wrote in his memoirs in 2003 Thank you, football also about this match that: ...Referee Yamasaki was completely on the side of the Italians.... But in TV recordings of this scene, in which Beckenbauer injured himself, with showing of slow motion the former national coach Sepp Herberger said that this scene cannot justify a penalty kick and referee's decision was impartial.

In club football he officiated 23 Copa Libertadores matches including 2 Final matches in 1965 and a match in 1965 Intercontinental Cup Final (2nd leg) played between Independiente and Inter Milan.

== Personal life ==
Yamasaki was of Japanese Peruvian descent. After finishing his active referee career Arturo Yamasaki was the member of referee committee of the Mexican Football Association. In 2003 he was appointed president of the Mexican Arbitration Commission.

== Awards ==
In 1978, FIFA awarded him with a "Referees’ Special Award".
