= Armando Tobar =

Chilean footballer (1938-2016)

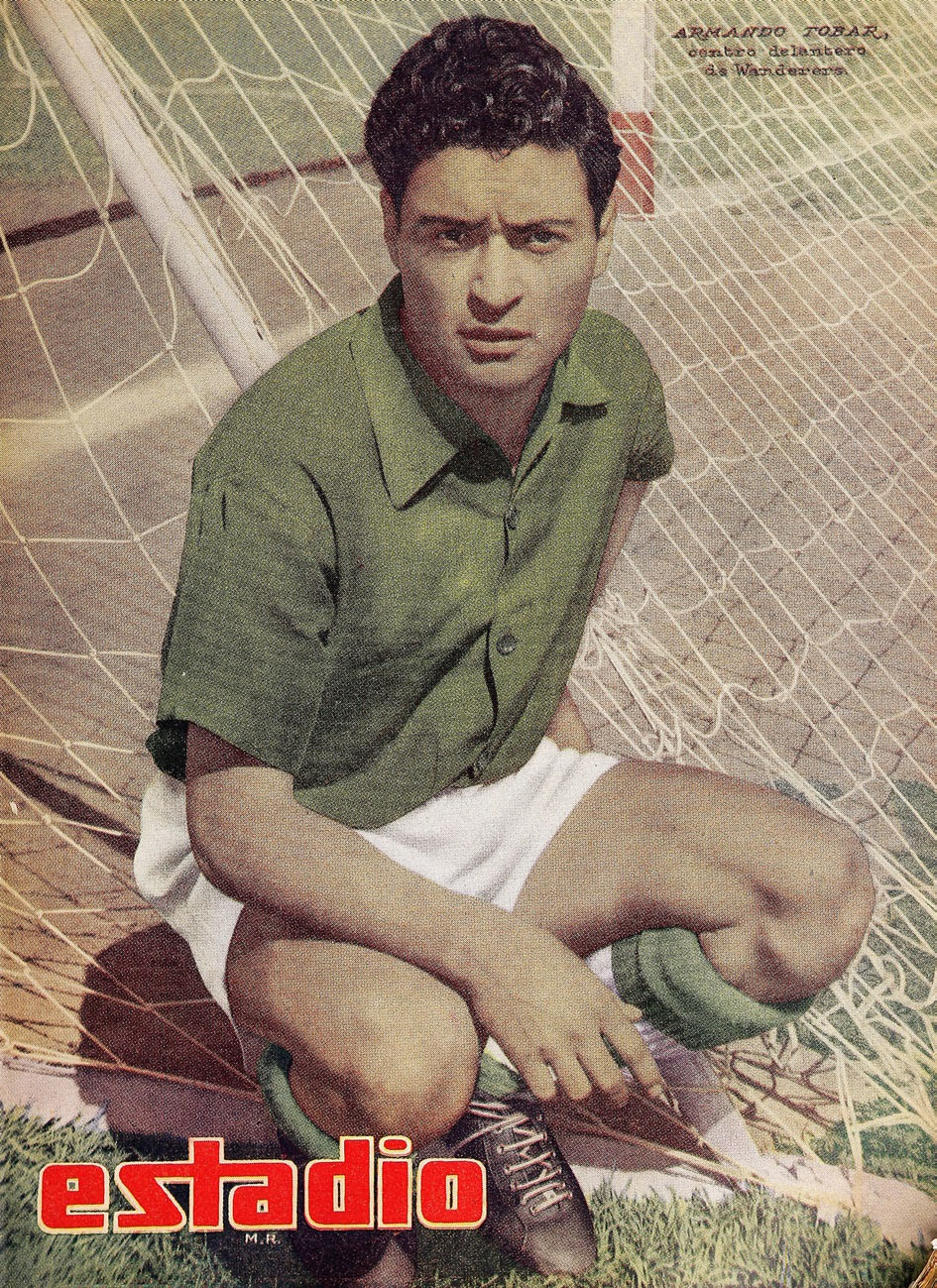
- Armando Tobar in 1957

Personal information
- Full name: Armando Segundo Tobar Vargas
- Date of birth: 7 June 1938
- Place of birth: Viña del Mar, Chile
- Date of death: 18 November 2016 (aged 78)
- Place of death: Viña del Mar, Chile
- Position: Forward

Youth career
- Cruz Verde
- Everton
- Santiago Wanderers

Senior career*
Years	Team	Apps	(Gls)
1956–1961	Santiago Wanderers		
1962–1970	Universidad Católica		

International career
1959–1967	Chile	33	(3)

Managerial career
- 1971–1972: Unión Española (assistant)
- 1973: Palestino (assistant)
- 1973: Universidad Católica (assistant)
- 1975: Huachipato
- 1976–1977: O'Higgins
- 1978: Audax Italiano
- 1978–1979: Huachipato
- 1981: Universidad de Chile (assistant)
- 1981: Santiago Wanderers
- 1985–1986: Everton
- 1986: Rangers
- 1991: Everton
- 1992: Santiago Wanderers
- 1994: Everton (youth)
Medal record
Men's football
Representing Chile
FIFA World Cup
Third place	1962 Chile
- * Club domestic league appearances and goals

Armando Segundo Tobar Vargas (7 June 1938 – 18 November 2016) was a Chilean football forward who played for Chile in the 1962 and 1966 FIFA World Cups. He also played for Club Deportivo Universidad Católica. He died after respiratory failure in 2016.

== Legacy ==
Constituted on 10 February 1960, Tobar was a leadership member of the Unión de Jugadores Profesionales (Union of Professional Football Players) in Chile.
