= Ken Aston =

English football referee (1915–2001)

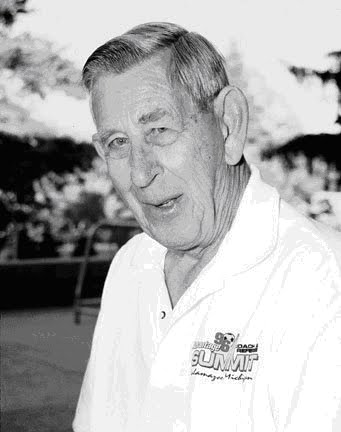
- Full name: Kenneth George Aston
- Born: 1 September 1915; Colchester, Essex, England
- Died: 23 October 2001 (aged 86); Ilford, London, England
- Other occupation: School teacher, soldier, referee

Kenneth George Aston, MBE (1 September 1915 – 23 October 2001) was an English teacher, soldier, and football referee, who was responsible for many important developments in football refereeing - including the yellow and red penalty card system.

== Early life and career ==
Born in Colchester, Essex, he graduated from St Luke's College, Exeter (in which fellow World Cup referee George Reader had been taught just after the First World War, and which Sir Stanley Rous had also attended). He qualified as a referee in 1936, working his way through the leagues becoming a Football League linesman in the 1949–50 season, and becoming a League referee. In the Second World War he was rejected by the Royal Air Force because of an injured ankle, and subsequently joined the Royal Artillery before transferring to the British Indian Army, where he finished the war with the rank of lieutenant-colonel and served on the Changi War Crimes Tribunal.

== Refereeing ==
On his return from military service in 1946, Aston became the first League referee to wear the black uniform with white trim which became the standard for referees. Up to that point, referees wore tweed jackets over white shirts with French cuffs, and plus fours such as one might wear for golf. He later explained that when he spied a black flight jacket in the window of a war surplus store, he was delighted with the wonderful assortment of pockets. He immediately bought a couple of the jackets, thinking the pockets would serve him well as a referee. He changed to black shorts, kept the white shirt, and wore the new black flight jacket, creating the black uniform with the apparent white "trim."

The following year (1947), he introduced brightly coloured linesman's flags, one yellow and one red, in place of those provided by the home team, in the home team's colours, which had traditionally been used. He explained that he was doing a game in the midst of a foggy London day. He said that the colours of the home team were beige and chocolate, colours he was unable to see in the fog. He explained that he went to war surplus store on the way home, purchased a pair of red and yellow rain slickers and made a set of brightly coloured flags, which he used thereafter, and was never troubled by fog again.

In 1953 he became Head Teacher at Newbury Park Primary School in Ilford, Essex, and progressed to refereeing senior League matches.

Aston taught many courses, including a series that was recorded for novice referees. He called the series, "Refereeing is thinking."

Aston refereed the 1963 FA Cup Final and the "Battle of Santiago", the match between Chile and Italy in the 1962 World Cup.

== FIFA Referees' Committee ==
Aston did not referee any more games either in the 1962 tournament (having strained his Achilles Tendon), or in later World Cups. He was, however, appointed to the FIFA Referees' Committee for eight years, chairing it for four. He was in charge of all referees for the 1966, 1970, and 1974 World Cups.

In 1966 Aston also introduced the practice of naming a substitute referee who could take over in the case of the referee being unable to continue for any reason (this eventually evolved into the practice of having a designated fourth official).

He also successfully proposed that the pressure of the ball should be specified in the Laws of the Game. In 1974, he introduced the number board for substitutes, so that players could easily understand who was being substituted.

He was also credited for the improvement of refereeing beginning with the 1970 World Cup in Mexico through his efforts to bring about uniformity.

== Red and yellow cards ==
Following an incident in the England vs Argentina match in the 1966 World Cup, it came to Aston's knowledge that Jack Charlton had been booked by the German referee, Rudolf Kreitlein. Charlton called the press office, where Aston was ensconced (as Head of World Cup Referees), in order to confirm the information that he had read within the newspaper that Kreitlein had booked him. Aston, driving from Wembley Stadium to Lancaster Gate that same evening, had Charlton's confusion in mind during the journey.

On the trip, as he stopped at a traffic light junction at Kensington High Street, Aston realised that a colour-coding scheme based on the same amber/yellow ('stop if safe to do so') - red (Stop) principle as used on traffic lights would traverse language barriers and clarify to players and spectators that they had been cautioned or sent off.

Aston later explained that upon arriving at his home, he explained the dilemma to his wife, Hilda. She disappeared into the other room, only to return a few minutes later with two "cards" made of construction paper. She had cut them to fit into his shirt pocket. Thus was devised the system whereby referees show a yellow card for a caution and a red card for an expulsion, which was first used in the 1970 World Cup.

These cards have also been adopted – with appropriate differences depending on the rules – in rugby, water polo, and other sports.

== Later career ==
Aston became senior lecturer of the Football Association Referees' Panel and Chief Instructor for the American Youth Soccer Organization (AYSO), a position he held for 21 years. In 1997, he was awarded the MBE.

The Ken Aston Camp is held annually in Orange, CA. The camp honours Ken's commitment to service and excellence. The Ken Aston Cup, was an annual competition to recognise skilled referees in AYSO. The tournament was held annually in southern California. As long as they were able, Aston and his wife Hilda were the guests of honour on the fields at the camp and competition. Ken taught at the camp and they drove around the tournament in a golf cart, observing, chatting, and making new friends. Their golf cart carried a Union Jack, making them easy to locate.

After a multi-year hiatus, it was scheduled to be held in Costa Mesa, California in March 2020.

Sporting positions
Preceded by none (1960 was the first)	UEFA European Championship final match referees 1960	Succeeded by Arthur Holland (England)
Preceded by Jim Finney	FA Cup final referee 1963	Succeeded by Arthur Holland
