= Josef Kadraba =

Czech footballer (1933–2019)

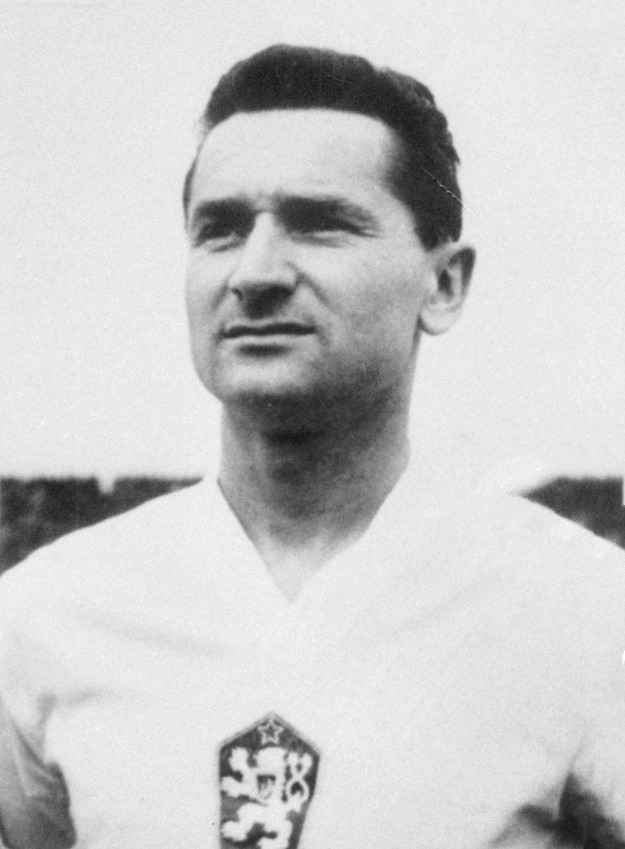
- Kadraba in 1962

Personal information
- Date of birth: 29 September 1933
- Place of birth: Řevničov, Czechoslovakia
- Date of death: 5 August 2019 (aged 85)
- Place of death: Vienna, Austria
- Position: Forward

Youth career
- Sokol Rakovník

Senior career*
Years	Team	Apps	(Gls)
1953	Slavoj Liberec		
1954–1955	Tankista Prague		
1955–1957	Sparta Prague		
1958–1965	SONP Kladno	289	(132)
1965–1967	Slavia Prague		
1967–1973	SC Hinteregger		
1973–1979	SK Slovan Wien		

International career
1958–1963	Czechoslovakia	17	(9)
Medal record
Men's football
Representing Czechoslovakia
FIFA World Cup
Runner-up	1962 Chile
- * Club domestic league appearances and goals

Josef Kadraba (29 September 1933 – 5 August 2019) was a Czech football player. He played for Czechoslovakia, playing 17 matches and scoring 9 goals.

He attended the 1962 FIFA World Cup, where Czechoslovakia won the silver medal. He scored one goal in the cup against Yugoslavia in the semi-final, which ended in a Czechoslovak victory by 3–1.

He lived for many years in Vienna, Austria.
