= Willi Schulz =

German former international footballer (born 1938)

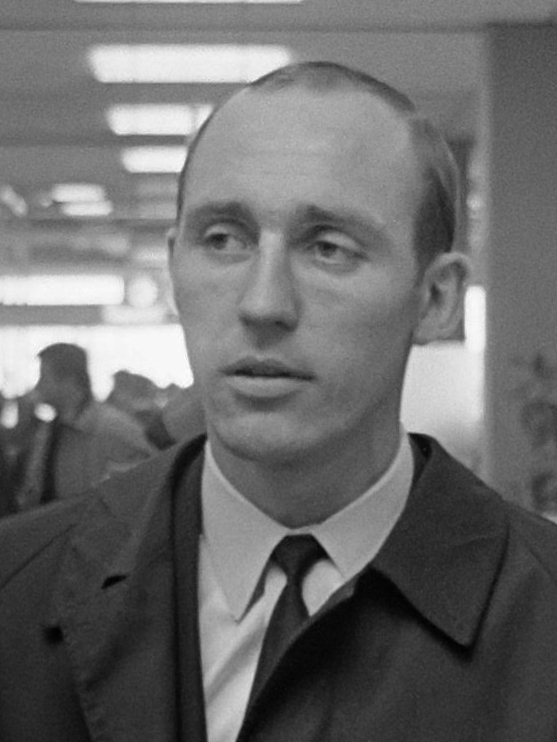
- Schulz in 1968

Personal information
- Date of birth: 4 October 1938 (age 88)
- Place of birth: Wattenscheid, Germany
- Height: 1.81 m (5 ft 11 in)
- Positions: Centre back; sweeper

Youth career
- 1950–1960: Union Günnigfeld

Senior career*
Years	Team	Apps	(Gls)
1960–1965	Schalke 04	134	(8)
1965–1973	Hamburger SV	211	(3)
Total		345	(11)

International career
1959	West Germany B	1	(0)
1959–1960	West Germany Amateur	8	(0)
1959–1970	West Germany	66	(0)
Medal record
Men's football
Representing West Germany
FIFA World Cup
Runner-up	1966 England
Third place	1970 Mexico
- * Club domestic league appearances and goals

Willi Schulz (born 4 October 1938) is a German former footballer who played as a defender for Schalke 04 and Hamburger SV. At international level, he made 66 appearances for the West Germany national team. He is now the last surviving player from the Germany team in the 1962 World Cup.

== Career ==
Schulz was born in Wattenscheid, Germany. He played his first of altogether 66 games for West Germany in 1959 at a time when he was still an amateur for lower league club Union Günnigfeld. In 1960, he joined FC Schalke 04, spending the first three years in the Oberliga West, and in 1963 the Bundesliga was officially created. In 1965 he changed outfit joining Hamburger SV.

Schulz started out as a right half back in the late 1950s. With the change from the WM system to the 4–2–4, Schulz was converted from half back to stopper by the mid-1960s. During the 1966 World Cup, Schulz acted as the sweeper of the West Germany national team, a role he had taken over from Klaus-Dieter Sieloff only shortly before the tournament. At that tournament, Schulz was rated as one of the best defenders. During the next four years, Schulz remained the standard sweeper of West Germany. During this time, Schulz was acknowledged as one of the best central defenders in global football. In November 1968, he was part of the FIFA XI that faced Brazil in Rio de Janeiro.

Schulz would have been the standard sweeper of West Germany during the 1970 World Cup, but an injury of the meniscus as well as a calf bruise meant that he only started in two of the six World Cup games in Mexico. In his place, Karl-Heinz Schnellinger played as sweeper. After the 1970 World Cup, Schulz retired from international activities. He continued to play for Hamburger SV until 1973.

== Playing style ==
Being a conservative sweeper with no urge to join the attack of his teams, Schulz focused on marshalling his defense. He was noted for his calmness even under pressure, his positional play, his strength at man-to-man duels, his solid passing game, aerial ability and a special expertise at sliding tackling. For these traits as well as his consistency at the top level, Schulz was revered by West Germany national team coach Helmut Schön, who preferred Schulz at the sweeper position to the younger and more adventurous Franz Beckenbauer, who had to play in midfield instead.

== Career after football ==
After his retirement, Schulz established an insurance agency in Hamburg and also engaged in the slot machine business. During the 1970s and 1980s, Schulz was also known for his critical sport columns for Hamburg newspapers. After the 1982 FIFA World Cup match between West Germany and Austria, in which the two sides colluded to allow West Germany to win 1–0 enabling both sides to progress at the expense of Algeria, Schulz famously called the West Germany players "gangsters".

== Honours ==
- 1966 FIFA World Cup runner-up
- 1970 FIFA World Cup 3rd place
- UEFA Cup Winners' Cup finalist: 1967–68
- DFB-Pokal finalist: 1966–67
