= Leo Goldstein =

American-Israeli football referee

Leo Goldstein (Hebrew: לאו גולדשטיין) was an American-Israeli association football referee who survived the Holocaust due to his expertise in the rules of soccer.

== Biography ==
Leo Goldstein was a Polish-born Jew. He was deported to Auschwitz and was condemned to the gas chambers but was suddenly pulled aside by an SS guard who claimed to be a German international soccer player. He was ordered to return to the barracks and serve as a referee in soccer games between soldiers and guards at Auschwitz and nearby camps.

After the war he immigrated to Israel, but eventually settled in New York, where he worked as a taxi driver and a referee of soccer games in the Bowery.

== Sports career ==
Goldstein refereed for the American Soccer League in the 1950s and 1960s, before becoming a FIFA international referee between 1959 and 1967. Goldstein was active as an assistant referee at FIFA World Cups, officiating the Hungary-England and Chile-Italy matches in the group stages in 1962. He also officiated in the 1959 Pan American Games and 1962 World Cup qualifiers.

Goldstein is a member of the National Soccer Hall of Fame and Museum.

== See also ==
- List of Jews in sports (non-players)
