= Rolf Wüthrich =

Swiss footballer (1938-2004)

Personal information
- Full name: Rolf Wüthrich
- Date of birth: 4 September 1938
- Place of birth: Switzerland
- Date of death: June 2004
- Position: Midfielder

Senior career*
| Years | Team | Apps | (Gls) |
| 1958–1961 | FC Zürich | | |
| 1961–1962 | Servette FC | | |
| 1962–1964 | Grasshopper Club Zürich | | |
| 1964–1965 | 1. FC Nürnberg | 17 | (3) |
| 1965–1968 | BSC Young Boys | | |
| 1968–1969 | FC Luzern | | |

International career
| 1961–1965 | Switzerland | 13 | (2) |
- * Club domestic league appearances and goals

Rolf Wüthrich (4 September 1938 – June 2004) was a Swiss footballer.

== International career ==
Wüthrich won 13 caps and 2 goals for the Switzerland national football team. The first cap was 20 May 1961 in Lausanne against Belgium which Switzerland won 2–1. He played his last international match against Albania on 2 May 1965 in Lausanne which Switzerland also won 1–0. Wüthrich also played in the 1962 FIFA World Cup and scored one goal against Chile.
