= Leonel Sánchez =

Chilean footballer (1936–2022)

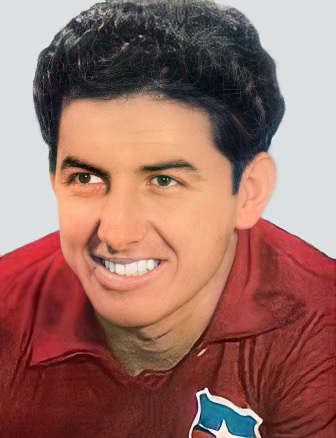
- Sánchez in 1959

Personal information
- Full name: Leonel Guillermo Sánchez Lineros
- Date of birth: 25 April 1936
- Place of birth: Santiago, Chile
- Date of death: 2 April 2022 (aged 85)
- Place of death: Santiago, Chile
- Height: 1.74 m (5 ft 9 in)
- Position: Left forward

Senior career*
Years	Team	Apps	(Gls)
1953–1969	Universidad de Chile	386	(159)
1963	→ AC Milan (loan)	0	(0)
1969–1970	Colo-Colo	31	(2)
1971–1972	Palestino	15	(10)
1972–1973	Ferroviarios	11	(7)
Total		443	(178)

International career
1955–1968	Chile	85	(24)

Managerial career
- 1985–1986: Universidad de Chile
- 1987: Universidad de Chile
Medal record
Men's football
Representing Chile
FIFA World Cup
Third place	1962 Chile
Copa América
Runner-up	1956 Uruguay
Third place	1967 Uruguay
- * Club domestic league appearances and goals

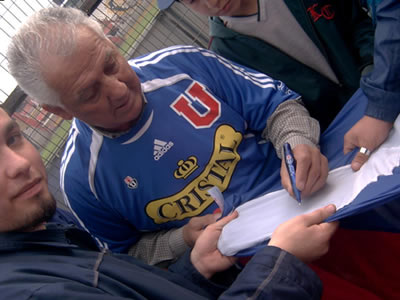
40 years after the Ballet Azul, Universidad de Chile supporters still idolize him

Leonel Guillermo Sánchez Lineros (25 April 1936 – 2 April 2022) was a Chilean professional footballer who played as a striker or on the left wing.

He is recognized as one of the Best South American Footballers of the 20th Century and one of the great forwards in the history of the FIFA World Cup. He was the top goalscorer of the 1962 FIFA World Cup where Chile achieved a historic third-place finish. He was also part of the team of the tournament of the World Cup and was awarded the Golden Boot and the Bronze Ball from FIFA. He was also included in the top 100 players of the history of the World Cups by FIFA. At the continental level he was part of the team of the tournament of the 1956 South American Championship, where Chile was the runner-up. In addition, Conmebol included him among the best specialists of free kicks in the history of South America.

Considered one of the best Chilean players in history and one of the club's greatest idols for the club Universidad de Chile, he was one of the leaders of the Blue Ballet era (1959–1969). is remembered for having been the leader of the Chile national team that placed third in the 1962 FIFA World Cup and was one of the prominent participants in the infamous match against Italy. In that match Sanchez had a number of scuffles with Mario David the Italian defender who was eventually sent off for a head high tackle on Sanchez. In La Roja, Leonel Sánchez is the seventh all-time top scorer with a total of 24 goals and 13 assists.

His performances both at the Universidad of Chile and in the national team made him recognized by the IFFHS as the 40th Best South American Footballer of the 20th Century, surpassing several international players such as his compatriot Iván Zamorano, Brazilians Domingos da Guia and Ademir Marques de Menezes, Uruguayan José Pedro Cea and Argentine Raimundo Orsi.

== Career ==
He played at left midfield for over 20 years between 1953 and 1973. 17 of those 20 years were for Universidad de Chile, where he was the icon of the Ballet Azul (Blue Ballet), a team that won 6 national championships between 1959 and 1969.

Constituted on 10 February 1960, Sánchez was a leadership member of the Unión de Jugadores Profesionales (Union of Professional Football Players) in Chile.

Four of his 24 international goals were at the 1962 World Cup on home soil, where he was the top scorer along with five other players as Chile finished the tournament in third place. In that World Cup he is also remembered for his disputes with several Italian players in the infamous Chile – Italy match in the first round: he knocked out the Italian player Mario David with a punch in an altercation after being fouled, and was subsequently kicked in the head by David a few minutes later, resulting in the Italian defender's sending off. Sánchez later also broke Humberto Maschio's nose with a left hook; Chile won the match 2–0. Because of his role in the match, later dubbed the "Battle of Santiago", in 2007, The Times placed Sánchez at number 6 in their list of the 50 hardest footballers in history.

Sánchez remained at Universidad de Chile, although he received numerous offers from well known European clubs such as Real Madrid, Juventus and AC Milan. However, he played on loan for AC Milan, previous to a possible signing, in the Torneo Città di Milano (Milan City Tournament) in June 1963 against both Inter Milan and Santos, where they became champions. He coincided with Mario David, with whom he had quarreled a year before in the Battle of Santiago. In 1969, after a contract rule was settled, Universidad de Chile was forced to sell him. He finished his career playing for Chilean clubs Colo-Colo, Palestino and Ferroviarios.

== Career statistics ==
=== Club ===
Appearances and goals by club, season and competition
Club	Season	League			Cup		Continental		Total	
Club	Season	Division	Apps	Goals	Apps	Goals	Apps	Goals	Apps	Goals
Universidad de Chile	1953	Chilean Primera División	4	1	–		–		4	1
Universidad de Chile	1954	Chilean Primera División	5	3	–		–		5	3
Universidad de Chile	1955	Chilean Primera División	33	14	–		–		33	14
Universidad de Chile	1956	Chilean Primera División	22	10	–		–		22	10
Universidad de Chile	1957	Chilean Primera División	21	14	–		–		21	14
Universidad de Chile	1958	Chilean Primera División	25	9	2	1	–		27	10
Universidad de Chile	1959	Chilean Primera División	26	22	6	4	–		32	26
Universidad de Chile	1960	Chilean Primera División	23	10	–		2	0	25	10
Universidad de Chile	1961	Chilean Primera División	24	6	2	0	–		26	6
Universidad de Chile	1962	Chilean Primera División	32	19	–		–		32	19
Universidad de Chile	1963	Chilean Primera División	27	11	–		3	0	30	11
Universidad de Chile	1964	Chilean Primera División	24	5	–		–		24	5
Universidad de Chile	1965	Chilean Primera División	30	15	–		4	0	34	15
Universidad de Chile	1966	Chilean Primera División	19	8	–		5	2	24	10
Universidad de Chile	1967	Chilean Primera División	34	6	–		–		34	6
Universidad de Chile	1968	Chilean Primera División	27	6	–		1	0	28	6
Universidad de Chile	1969	Chilean Primera División	10	0	1	1	–		11	1
Universidad de Chile	Total		386	159	11	6	15	2	412	167
Colo Colo	1970	Chilean Primera División	31	2	–		–		31	2
Total			417	161	11	6	15	2	443	169

=== International ===
Appearances and goals by national team and year
National team	Year	Apps	Goals
Chile	1955	2	0
Chile	1956	9	2
Chile	1957	7	0
Chile	1958	0	0
Chile	1959	9	3
Chile	1960	10	2
Chile	1961	8	6
Chile	1962	7	4
Chile	1963	1	5
Chile	1964	2	0
Chile	1965	10	0
Chile	1966	12	0
Chile	1967	5	1
Chile	1968	3	1
Total		85	24

Scores and results list Chile's goal tally first, score column indicates score after each Sánchez goal.

List of international goals scored by Leonel Sánchez
No.	Date	Venue	Opponent	Score	Result	Competition
1	24 January 1956	Montevideo, Uruguay	Brazil		4–1	1956 South American Championship
2	9 February 1956	Montevideo, Uruguay	Peru		4–3	1956 South American Championship
3	11 March 1959	Buenos Aires, Argentina	Paraguay		1–2	1959 South American Championship (Argentina)
4	26 March 1959	Buenos Aires, Argentina	Bolivia		5–2	1959 South American Championship (Argentina)
5	18 November 1959	Santiago, Chile	Argentina		4–2	Friendly match
6	5 June 1960	Montevideo, Uruguay	Uruguay		2–2	Friendly
7	5 June 1960	Montevideo, Uruguay	Uruguay		2–2	Friendly
8	19 March 1961	Santiago, Chile	Peru		5–2	Friendly
9	19 March 1961	Santiago, Chile	Peru		5–2	Friendly
10	26 March 1961	Santiago, Chile	West Germany		3–1	Friendly
11	26 March 1961	Santiago, Chile	West Germany		3–1	Friendly
12	9 December 1961	Santiago, Chile	Hungary		5–1	Friendly
13	9 December 1961	Santiago, Chile	Hungary		5–1	Friendly
14	30 May 1962	Santiago, Chile	Switzerland		3–1	1962 FIFA World Cup
15	30 May 1962	Santiago, Chile	Switzerland		3–1	1962 FIFA World Cup
16	10 June 1962	Arica, Chile	Soviet Union		2–1	1962 FIFA World Cup
17	13 June 1962	Santiago, Chile	Brazil		2–4	1962 FIFA World Cup
18	16 May 1965	Montevideo, Uruguay	Uruguay		1–1	Copa Juan Pinto Durán
19	21 July 1965	Santiago, Chile	Argentina		1–1	Copa Carlos Dittborn
20	1 August 1965	Santiago, Chile	Colombia		7–2	1966 FIFA World Cup qualification
21	22 August 1965	Santiago, Chile	Ecuador		3–1	1966 FIFA World Cup qualification
22	12 October 1965	Lima, Perú	Ecuador		2–1	1966 FIFA World Cup qualification
23	13 December 1967	Santiago, Chile	Hungary		4–5	Friendly
24	27 August 1968	Ciudad de México, México	Mexico		1-3	Friendly

== Personal life ==
Leonel Sanchez was the son of a professional boxer.

Sanchez studied at República Argentina, a prestigious public primary school of Santiago; and at Manuel Barros Borgoño, a traditional public secondary school of the capital.

== Honours ==
Universidad de Chile

- Chilean League: 1959, 1962, 1964, 1965, 1967, 1969
- Metropolitan Tournament of Chile: 1968, 1969
- Copa Francisco Candelori: 1969

AC Milan

- Torneo Città di Milano: 1963

Colo-Colo

- Chilean League: 1970

Chile

- Copa América runner-up: 1956
- FIFA World Cup third-place: 1962

Individual

- Golden Boot: 1962
- All-Star Team: 1962 FIFA World Cup
- IFFHS South America best Player of the Century: N°40
