= Jorge Toro =

Chilean footballer (1939–2024)

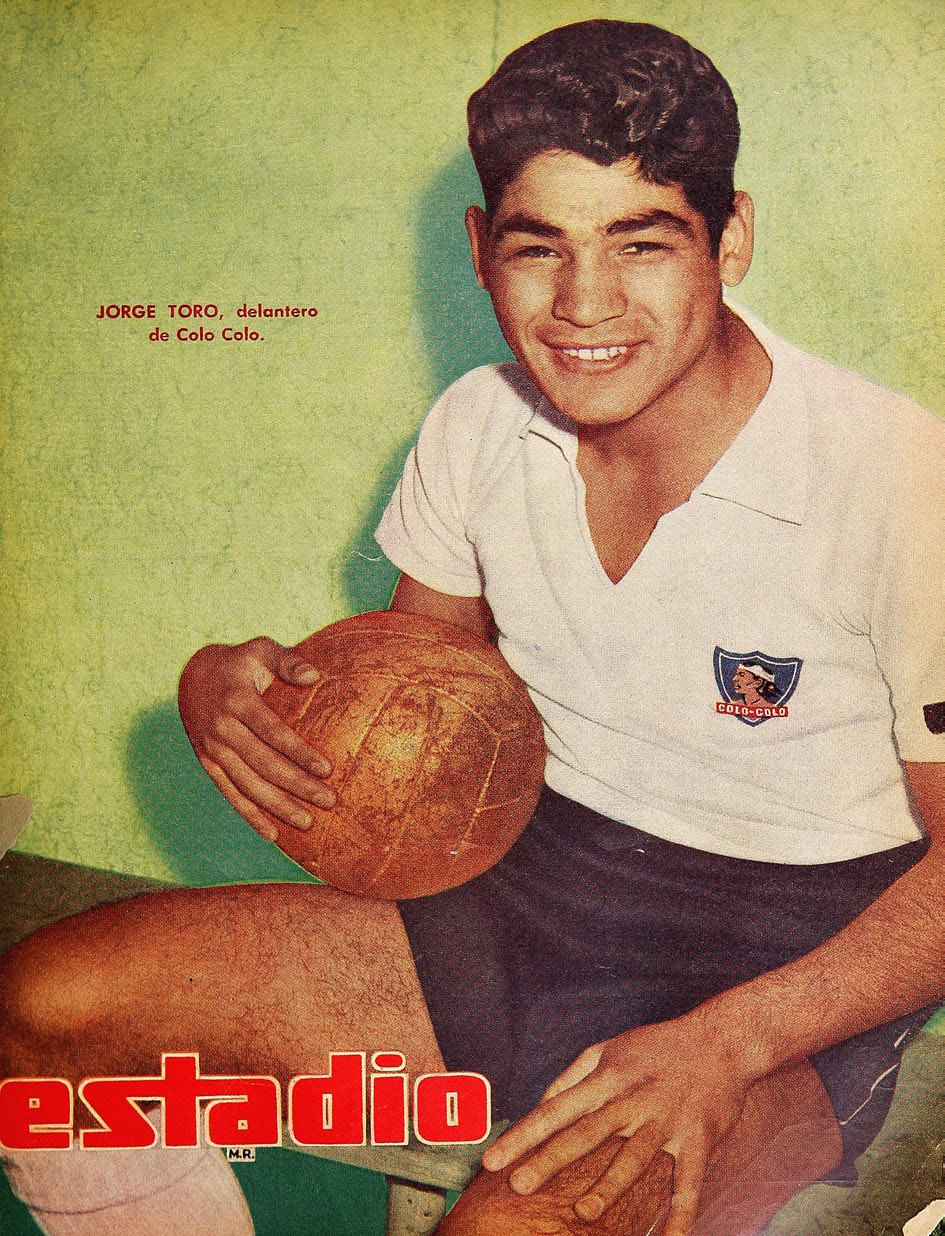
- Toro in 1959

Personal information
- Full name: Jorge Luis Toro Sánchez
- Date of birth: 10 January 1939
- Place of birth: Santiago, Chile
- Date of death: 16 February 2024 (aged 85)
- Place of death: El Quisco, Chile
- Height: 1.72 m (5 ft 8 in)
- Position: Attacking midfielder

Senior career*
Years	Team	Apps	(Gls)
1959–1962	Colo-Colo	61	(18)
1962–1963	Sampdoria	16	(3)
1963–1969	Modena	154	(19)
1969–1970	→ Hellas Verona (loan)	7	(0)
1971	Colo-Colo	8	(1)
1972–1973	Unión Española	38	(20)
1974	Deportes Concepción	14	(5)
1975	Audax Italiano	12	(1)
1976	Deportes La Serena	7	(2)
Total		317	(69)

International career
1959–1973	Chile	29	(6)

Managerial career
- 1978: Unión La Calera
- 1979: Colchagua
- 1981: Santiago Wanderers
- 1981: San Antonio Unido
- 1982–1983: Deportes Iquique
- 1984: Unión La Calera
- 1985–1986: Cobreloa
Medal record
Men's football
Representing Chile
FIFA World Cup
Third place	1962 Chile
- * Club domestic league appearances and goals

Jorge Luis Toro Sánchez (10 January 1939 – 16 February 2024) was a Chilean footballer who played as a midfielder. He represented his native country at the 1962 FIFA World Cup in Chile. He scored the second goal in Chile's 2-0 win over Italy at that tournament, in a match that is remembered as the Battle of Santiago. Toro died in El Quisco on 16 February 2024, at the age of 85.

== Honours ==
Colo-Colo

- Chilean Primera División: 1960

Unión Española

- Primera División: 1973

Chile

- FIFA World Cup third place: 1962
