= Sergio Navarro (footballer, born 1936) =

Chilean footballer and manager

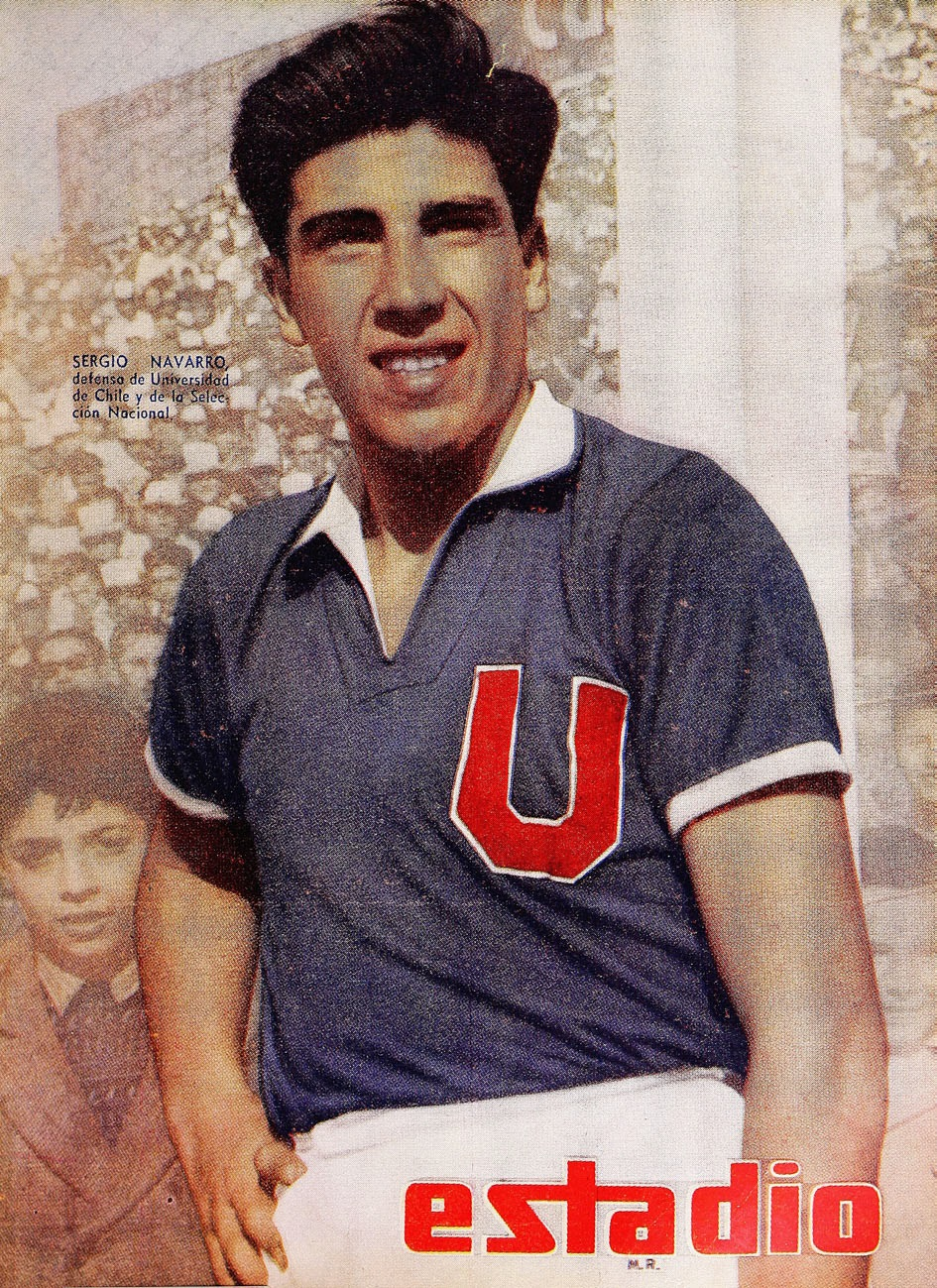
- Navarro in 1957

Personal information
- Full name: Sergio Raúl Navarro Rodríguez
- Date of birth: February 20, 1936 (age 90)
- Place of birth: Santiago, Chile
- Position: Left-back

Senior career*
Years	Team	Apps	(Gls)
1955–1964	Universidad de Chile		
1965–1967	Colo-Colo		
1967–1968	Unión Española		

International career
1957–1962	Chile	30	(0)

Managerial career
- 1968: Unión Española
- 1968: San Luis
- 1972: Ferroviarios
- 1973: Magallanes
- 1976: Aviación
- 1977–1978: Colo-Colo
- 1978: Naval
- 1979–1980: Curicó Unido
- 1982: Iberia
- 1983–1984: Deportes Puerto Montt
- 1985: Deportes Antofagasta
Medal record
Men's football
Representing Chile
FIFA World Cup
Third place	1962 Chile
- * Club domestic league appearances and goals

Sergio Raúl Navarro Rodríguez (born February 20, 1936, in Santiago, Chile) is a Chilean former football player and manager who played as a left-back.

== Career ==
Navarro played for Universidad de Chile (1955–1964), Colo-Colo (1965–1967) and Unión Española (1967–1968), and appeared for the Chile national team in the 1962 FIFA World Cup, held in Chile.

Constituted on 10 February 1960, Navarro was a leadership member of the Unión de Jugadores Profesionales (Union of Professional Football Players) in Chile. On 6 April 1965, Navarro was one of the constituent footballers of SIFUP, the trade union of professionales footballers in Chile, alongside fellows such as Efraín Santander, Manuel Astorga, Misael Escuti, among others.

== Personal life ==
Navarro is the father of Carlos Navarro Poblete, a fitness coach and sports author who has worked for several football clubs such as Universidad de Chile and Colo-Colo.

== Honours ==
Universidad de Chile

- Primera División (3): 1959, 1962, 1964
