= Horst Szymaniak =

German footballer (1934–2009)

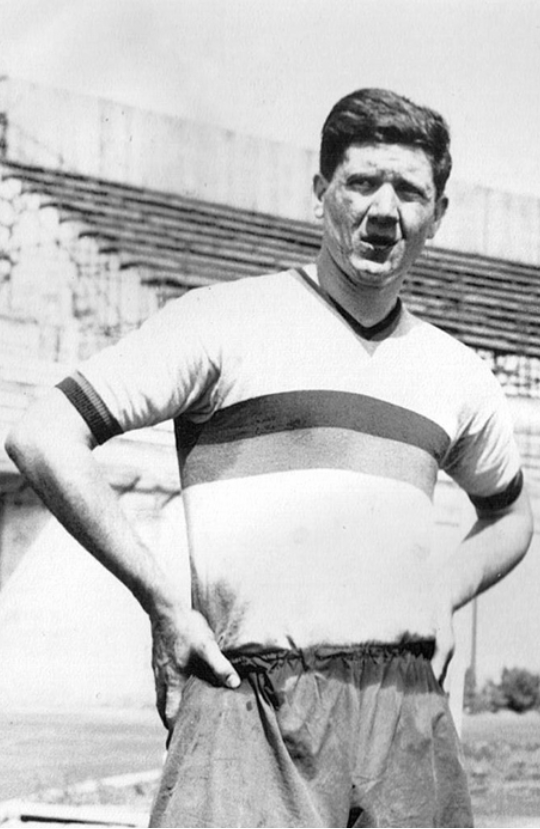
- Szymaniak in the 1960–61 season

Personal information
- Date of birth: 29 August 1934
- Place of birth: Erkenschwick, Germany
- Date of death: 9 October 2009 (aged 75)
- Place of death: Melle, Germany
- Position: Midfielder

Youth career
- 1943–1952: SpVgg Erkenschwick

Senior career*
| Years | Team | Apps | (Gls) |
| 1952–1955 | SpVgg Erkenschwick | 50 | (11) |
| 1955–1959 | Wuppertaler SV | 91 | (12) |
| 1959–1961 | Karlsruher SC | 53 | (2) |
| 1961–1963 | Catania | 62 | (8) |
| 1963–1964 | Internazionale Milano | 6 | (0) |
| 1964–1965 | Varese | 23 | (0) |
| 1965–1966 | Tasmania 1900 Berlin | 29 | (1) |
| 1966 | FC Biel | | |
| 1967 | Chicago Spurs | 12 | (1) |

International career
| 1956–1966 | West Germany | 43 | (2) |
| 1956–1965 | West Germany B | 2 | (0) |
- * Club domestic league appearances and goals

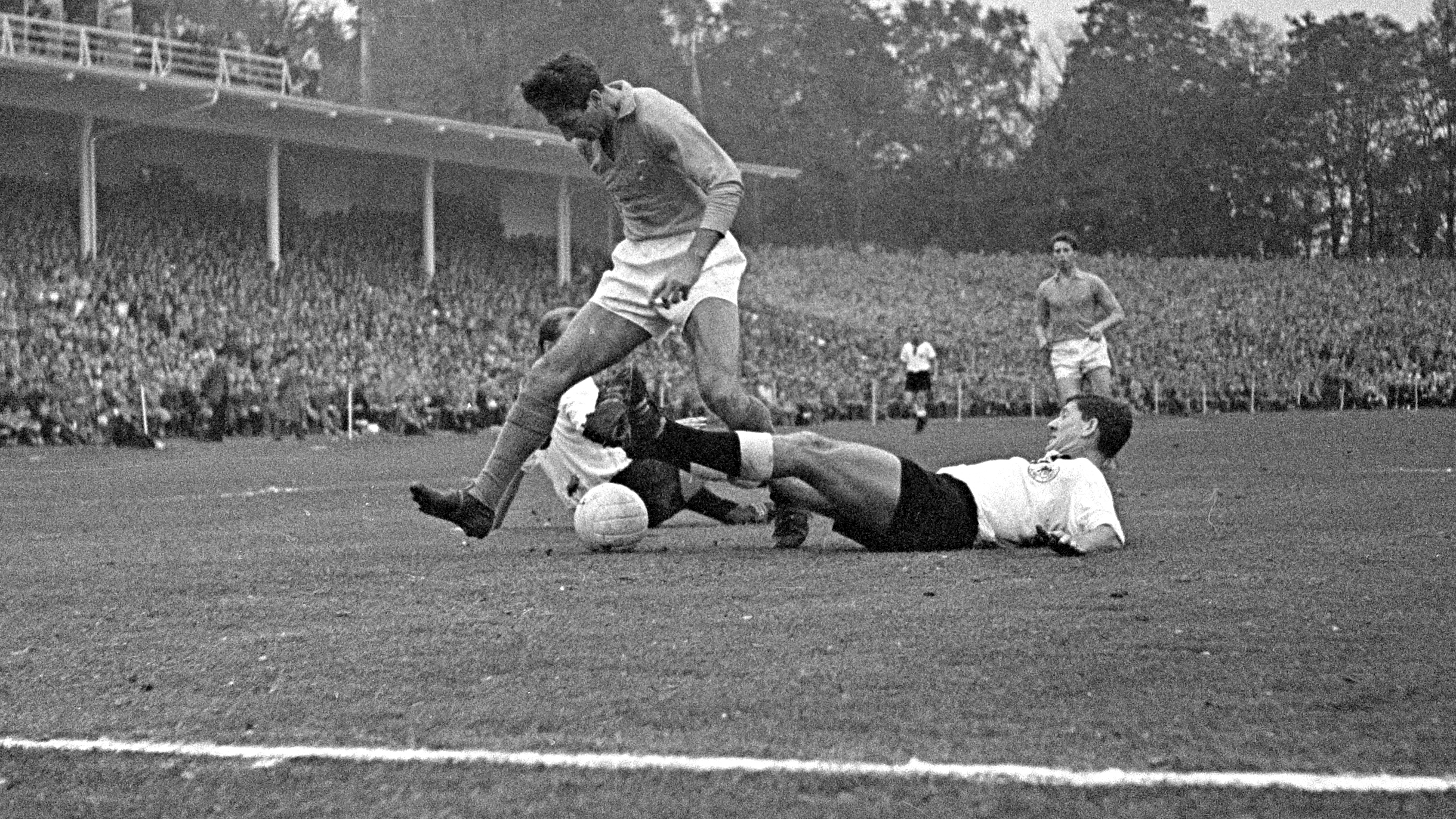
Szymaniak stops Dutchman Faas Wilkes (1959).

Horst "Schimmi" Szymaniak (29 August 1934 – 9 October 2009) was a German footballer who played as a midfielder.

== Club career ==
Szymaniak was born in Oer-Erkenschwick. The clubs he played for include: SpVgg Erkenschwick, Wuppertaler SV, Karlsruher SC, Calcio Catania, F.C. Internazionale Milano, A.S. Varese 1910, and Tasmania 1900 Berlin for whom he played in the 1965–66 season, the side's only season in the Bundesliga.

Szymaniak was a defensive midfielder who usually played as a left half back and less frequently as an inside forward. He had good ball skills, had good vision and was able to make unerringly accurate long passes to a teammate. He was renowned for his slide tackling ability, so much so this became his trademark ability.

He was renowned as one of the best players in German football during the late 1950s and early 1960s, with Kicker rating him world class five times between 1957 and 1961 in their biennial Rangliste des deutschen Fußballs (ranking list of German football).

== International career ==
Szymaniak played 43 times and scored two goals for the West Germany national team between 1956 and 1966, and was chosen to play in both the 1958 and the 1962 World Cups, but was omitted by Helmut Schön from his 1966 squad.

== Death ==
Szymaniak died after a long illness on 9 October 2009 in a nursing home in Melle near Osnabrück.

== Honours ==
Karlsruher SC

- Oberliga Süd: 1959–60

Inter Milan

- European Cup: 1962–63
