= Carlos Contreras (footballer, born 1938) =

Chilean footballer (1938–2020)

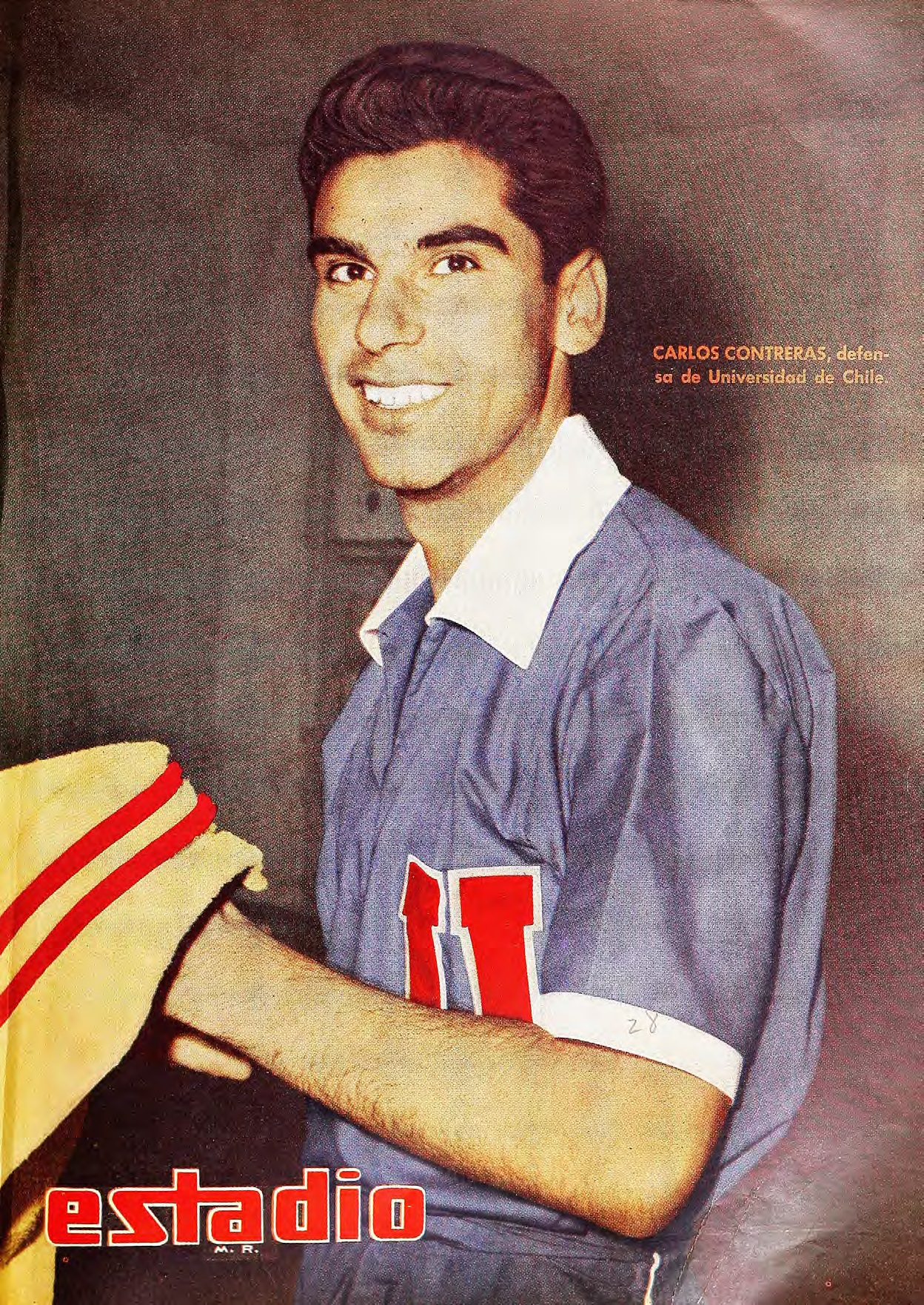

Personal information
- Full name: Carlos Raúl Contreras Guillén
- Date of birth: 7 October 1938
- Place of birth: Santiago, Chile
- Date of death: 17 April 2020 (aged 81)
- Place of death: Puente Alto, Chile
- Height: 1.80 m (5 ft 11 in)
- Position: Defender

Senior career*
Years	Team	Apps	(Gls)
1958–1969	Universidad de Chile	189	(2)
1970–1971	Antofagasta Portuario	45	(3)
1972–1973	Ferroviarios		

International career
1959–1966	Chile	30	(0)

Managerial career
- 1975–1976: Deportes Aviación
- 1978: Rangers de Talca
- 1980–1981: Unión La Calera
- 1983: Curicó Unido
- 1984: Santiago Morning
Medal record
Men's football
Representing Chile
FIFA World Cup
Third place	1962 Chile
- * Club domestic league appearances and goals

Carlos Raúl Contreras Guillén (7 October 1938 – 17 April 2020) was a Chilean football defender who played for Chile in the 1962 FIFA World Cup. He also played for Club Universidad de Chile.

== Honors ==
- Chilean League: (6)
  - 1959, 1962, 1964, 1965, 1967, 1969
- Tournament Metropolitan: (2)
  - 1968, 1969
- Cup Francisco Candelori: (1)
  - 1969
