= Raúl Sánchez (footballer, born 1933) =

Chilean footballer (1933–2016)

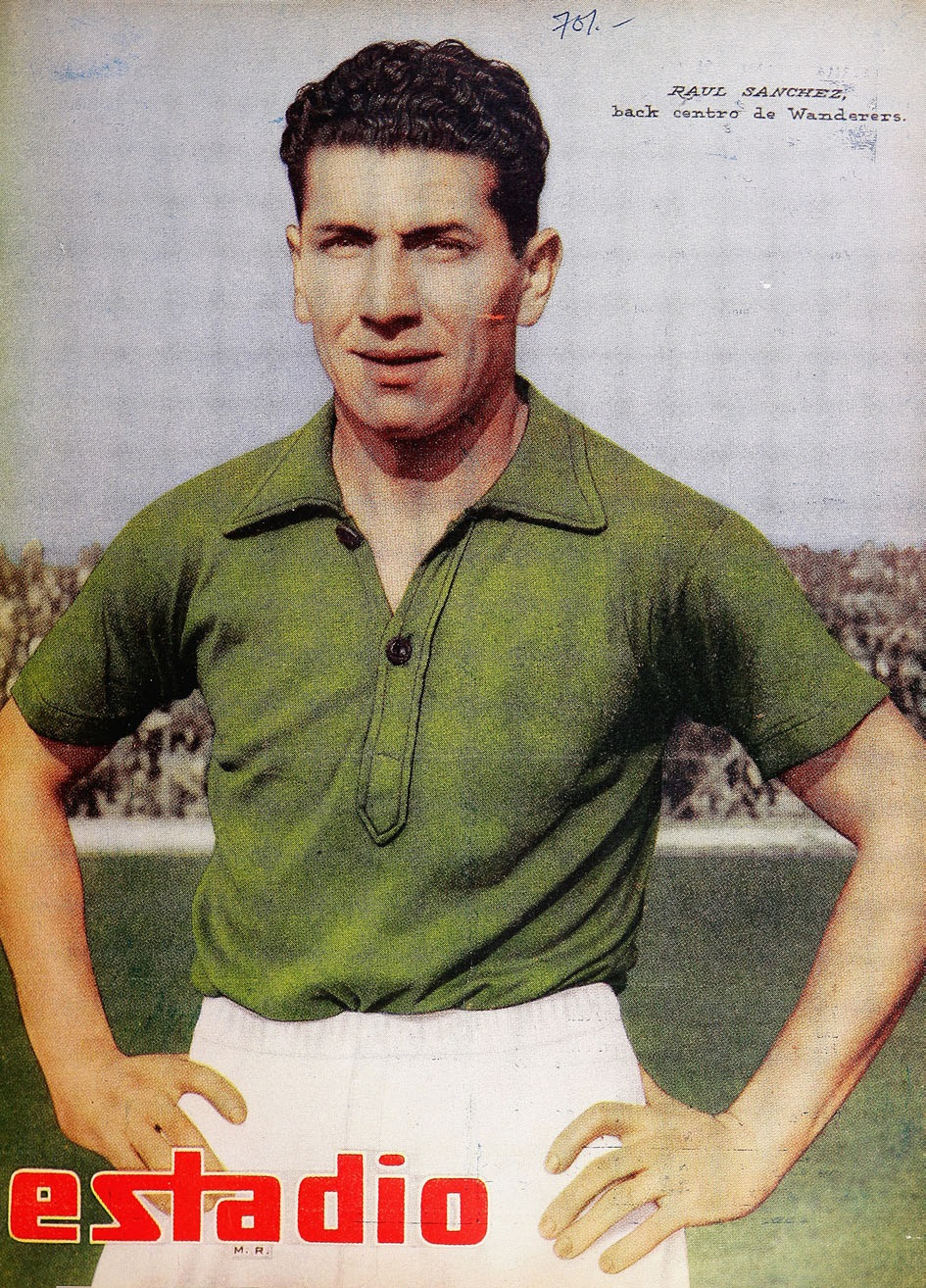

Personal information
- Full name: Raúl Pedro Sánchez Soya
- Date of birth: 26 October 1933
- Place of birth: Valparaíso, Chile
- Date of death: 28 February 2016 (aged 82)
- Position: Defender

Senior career*
Years	Team	Apps	(Gls)
1952–1964	Santiago Wanderers		
1965–1966	Colo-Colo		
1967	Rangers		
1968–1970	Everton		

International career
1959–1964	Chile	33	(0)
Medal record
Men's football
Representing Chile
FIFA World Cup
Third place	1962 Chile
- * Club domestic league appearances and goals

Raúl Pedro Sánchez Soya (26 October 1933 – 28 February 2016) was a Chilean football defender who played for Chile in the 1962 FIFA World Cup. He also played for Santiago Wanderers, Everton and Colo-Colo.
