= Jaime Ramírez (footballer, born 1931) =

Chilean footballer

Personal information
- Full name: Jaime Caupolicán Ramírez Banda
- Date of birth: 14 August 1931
- Place of birth: Santiago, Chile
- Date of death: 26 February 2003 (aged 71)
- Place of death: Santiago, Chile
- Height: 1.69 m (5 ft 7 in)
- Position: Forward

Youth career
- 1946–1947: Badminton
- 1948–1949: Universidad de Chile

Senior career*
Years	Team	Apps	(Gls)
1950–1952	Universidad de Chile		
1953–1954	Español	30	(9)
1954–1958	Colo-Colo		
1958–1960	Granada	49	(7)
1961	O'Higgins		
1962	Universidad de Chile	29	(3)
1962	Racing Club		
1963	Audax Italiano		
1963–1964	Español	10	(0)
1964–1966	Hospitalet		
1966	Universidad de Chile	5	(2)
1967–1969	Huachipato		
1970	Palestino		
1971–1972	Unión San Felipe		

International career
1954–1966	Chile	46	(10)

Managerial career
- 1979: Unión La Calera
- 1981: Olimpia
- 1983–1984: Provincial Osorno
- 1988: Sport Boys
- 1989: Deportivo Cañaña
- * Club domestic league appearances and goals

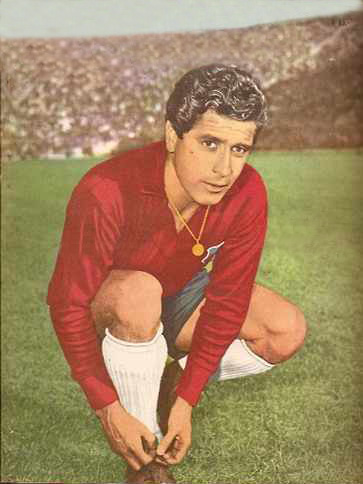
Jaime Ramírez in 1962, colourized

Jaime Caupolicán Ramírez Banda (14 August 1931 – 26 February 2003) was a Chilean former professional footballer who played as a right winger.

== Club career ==
Ramírez was skillful with the ball, he had great technique and played at the junior divisions of Bádminton F.C. (1946–1947), Universidad de Chile in 1949–1952, 1962 and 1966, he was a Colo-Colo champion with the team in 1956, O'Higgins, Huachipato, Audax Italiano, Unión San Felipe, Palestino and outside of his country of origin he played for Racing Club of Argentina, Espanyol from Barcelona and Granada from Spain. In this country, he showed so much ability that he was nicknamed "Superclase" meaning "Super-Class" by sports commentators and the media.

Ramírez was a member of the Unión San Felipe team that competeted in the 1972 Copa Libertadores, in which he scored a consolation goal in a 3–1 loss to Universitario in the group stages, becoming, at the age of 40 years and 213 days, the oldest-ever goalscorer in the history of the Copa Libertadores at the time, a record that he held for nearly three decades, until it was finally broken by Óscar Aguirregaray in 2001, aged 41, and later by Roque Santa Cruz and Zé Roberto, both aged 42.

Constituted on 23 November 1956, Ramírez was a leadership member of the Sindicato Profesional de Jugadores de Fútbol (Professional Trade Union of Football Players) in Chile.

== International career ==
Ramírez participated in 56 games for Chile, where 36 games were official games and he scored 13 goals. He made his debut in the national team on 17 September 1954, in a game against Peru, where Chile defeated Peru 2–1. But his most memorable presentations in the national team took place in 1962, where he scored two goals, one against Switzerland, and one against Italy. On the other hand, he was one of the best players of the tournament, playing frequently as a right winger, midfielder, and even left defender taking advantage of his many talents. His great performance attracted to Racing de Avellaneda from Argentina. At the end of his career and being aged 35 years old, he was a member of the Chile team that competed in the 1966 World Cup.

== Managerial career ==
He was the manager of Olimpia in Honduras and both Sport Boys and Deportivo Cañaña in Peru.

== Personal life ==
He was the son of Aníbal Ramírez, a Chile international footballer in the 1924 South American Championship.

== Honors ==
Colo Colo

- Chilean Primera División: 1956

Universidad de Chile

- Chilean Primera División: 1962

Unión San Felipe

- Chilean Primera División: 1971

Chile

- Copa O'Higgins: 1957
