= Eladio Rojas =

Chilean footballer (1934-1991)

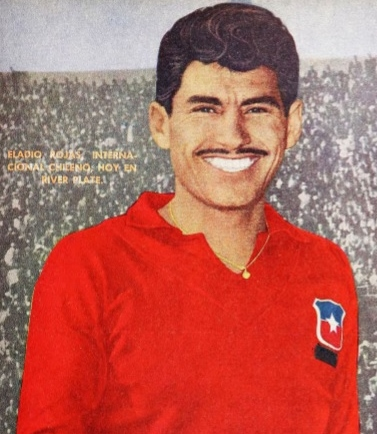
- Eladio Rojas in 1962

Personal information
- Full name: Eladio Alberto Rojas Díaz
- Date of birth: November 8, 1934
- Place of birth: Tierra Amarilla, Chile
- Date of death: January 13, 1991 (aged 56)
- Place of death: Puchuncaví, Chile
- Height: 1.81 m (5 ft 11 1/2 in)
- Position: Midfielder

Senior career*
Years	Team	Apps	(Gls)
1954–1962	Everton		
1962–1965	River Plate		
1965–1967	Colo-Colo		
1967–1968	Everton		

International career
1959–1966	Chile	23	(3)
Medal record
Men's football
Representing Chile
FIFA World Cup
Third place	1962 Chile
- * Club domestic league appearances and goals

Eladio Alberto Rojas Díaz (8 November 1934, in Tierra Amarilla, Chile – 13 January 1991, in Viña del Mar, Chile) was a former Chilean footballer who played as a midfielder for Everton and Colo-Colo of Chile, River Plate of Argentina, and the Chile national football team in the 1962 FIFA World Cup on home soil. Rojas scored the match winning goal for Chile in the 90th minute against Yugoslavia in the 1962 World Cup; his goal secured a third place finish for the World Cup hosts, which is Chile's best finish in the tournament to date. Rojas was also a starter on the River Plate teams of the 1960s that fiercely contested the Argentine Primera División title. While Rojas never won the title, River Plate did manage to place second in 1962 and 1963 as well as third in 1964.

== Teams ==
- Everton 1954–1962
- River Plate 1962–1965
- Colo-Colo 1965–1967
- Everton 1967–1968

== Personal life ==
His cousin, Leonel Herrera Rojas, is a historical player of Colo-Colo and the Chile national team and, also, the father of Leonel Herrera Silva, who scored in the 1991 Copa Libertadores final match for the same team.

== Honours ==
=== Club ===
River Plate

- Copa Ciudad de Bogotá (1): 1964
- Copa Confraternidad Iberoamericana (1): 1964

=== International ===
Chile

- FIFA World Cup Third place (1): 1962
- Copa O'Higgins (1): 1966
