= 1962 FIFA World Cup =

Association football tournament in Chile

Campeonato Mundial de Fútbol Copa Jules Rimet Chile 1962 (Spanish)

Tournament details
- Host country: Chile
- Dates: 30 May – 17 June
- Teams: 16 (from 3 confederations)
- Venues: 4 (in 4 host cities)

Final positions
- Champions: Brazil (2nd title)
- Runners-up: Czechoslovakia
- Third place: Chile
- Fourth place: Yugoslavia

Tournament statistics
- Matches played: 32
- Goals scored: 89 (2.78 per match)
- Attendance: 893,172 (27,912 per match)
- Top scorer(s): (Brazil) Garrincha (Brazil) Vavá (Chile) Leonel Sánchez (Hungary) Flórián Albert (Soviet Union) Valentin Ivanov (Socialist Federal Republic of Yugoslavia) Dražan Jerković (4 goals each)
- Best player: (Brazil) Garrincha
- Best young player: (Hungary) Flórián Albert
- Best goalkeeper: (Czechoslovakia) Viliam Schrojf

The 1962 FIFA World Cup was the seventh edition of the FIFA World Cup, the quadrennial international football championship for senior men's national teams. It was held from 30 May to 17 June 1962 in Chile. The qualification rounds took place between August 1960 and December 1961, with 56 teams entering from six confederations, and fourteen qualifying for the finals tournament alongside Chile, the hosts, and Brazil, the defending champions.

Brazil successfully defended their World Cup title, defeating Czechoslovakia 3–1 in the final in the Chilean capital Santiago. They became the second team, after Italy in 1934 and 1938, to win the World Cup twice consecutively; no team has since achieved the feat. Host nation Chile finished third, defeating Yugoslavia 1–0 in the match for third place.

The tournament was marred by violence between players on the pitch and a toxic atmosphere; it included the first-round match between Chile and Italy (2–0), which became known as the Battle of Santiago, one of a number of violent matches played throughout the tournament. The tournament saw a then-record six sendings off.

It was the first World Cup that used goal average as a means of separating teams with the same number of points. It was also the first World Cup in which the average number of goals per match was less than three (2.78); this has been repeated at every World Cup since.

== Host selection ==
After Europe hosted two consecutive World Cups, the American federations demanded the 1962 edition must be held in South America or they would stage a complete boycott of the tournament, similar to 1938. Argentina, after previously failed candidacies, was the favourite. Magallanes' chairman, Ernesto Alvear, attended a FIFA Congress held in Helsinki while the Finnish city was hosting the 1952 Summer Olympics. He considered that Chile was able to organise the World Cup. Several sources also say that FIFA did not want Argentina to run alone, requesting the participation of Chile as almost symbolic. Chile registered its candidacy in 1954 alongside Argentina and West Germany, the latter withdrawing at the request of FIFA.

Chile's football federation committee, led by Carlos Dittborn and Juan Pinto Durán, toured many countries convincing various football associations about the country's ability to organise the tournament in comparison to Argentina's superior sports infrastructure and prestige. The FIFA Congress met in Lisbon, Portugal on 10 June 1956. That day, Raul Colombo, representing Argentina's candidacy, ended his speech with the phrase "We can start the World Cup tomorrow. We have it all." The next day, Dittborn presented four arguments that supported Chile's candidacy: Chile's continued participations at FIFA-organised conferences and tournaments, sports climate, tolerance of race and creed and political and institutional stability of the country. In addition, Dittborn invoked Article 2 of the FIFA statutes that addressed the tournament's role in promoting the sport in countries deemed "underdeveloped". In a counter-point to Colombo's claim that "We have it all" Dittborn coined the phrase "Because we have nothing, we want to do it all" (Spanish: Porque no tenemos nada, queremos hacerlo todo) around the fifteenth minute of his speech. Chile won 32 votes to Argentina's 10. Fourteen members abstained from voting.

30th FIFA Congress vote
Bids	Vote
Bids	Result
Chile	31
Argentina	12
~~West Germany~~	Withdrew
Abstentions	13
Total votes	56

== Qualification ==
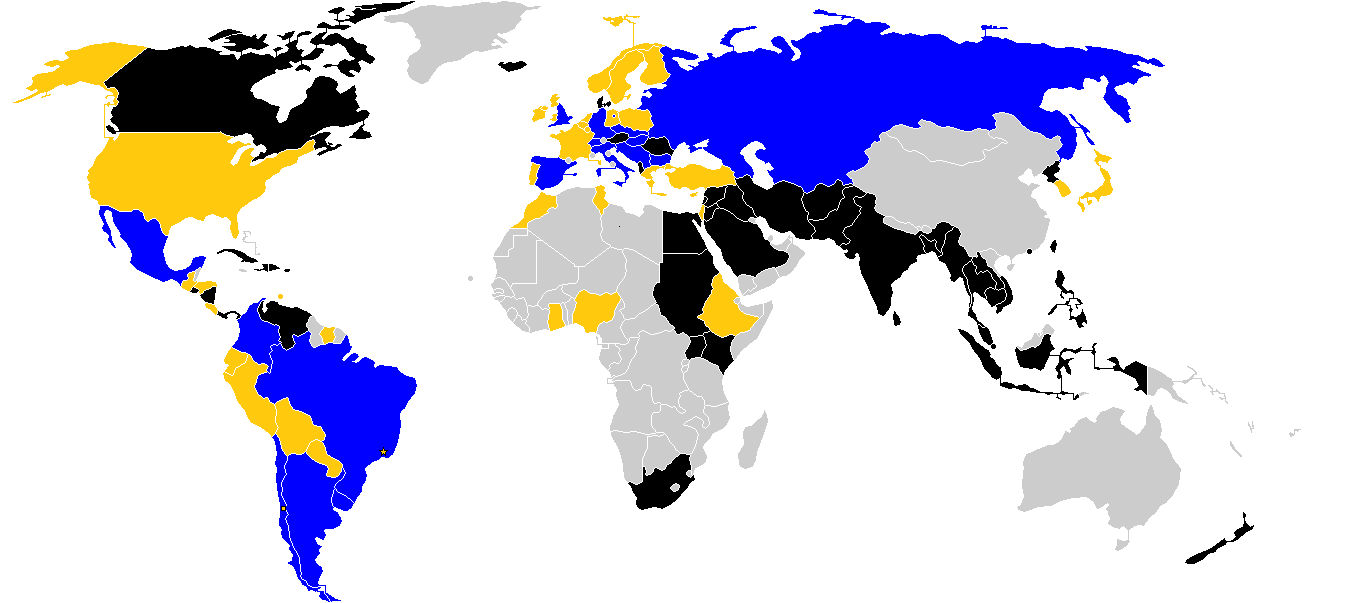
Countries qualified for World Cup Countries that failed to qualify Countries that did not enter World Cup Country not a FIFA member

57 teams entered the 1962 World Cup (due to rejected entries and withdrawals, 52 teams eventually participated in the qualifying stages). Chile as host nation and Brazil as reigning World Cup champions were granted automatic qualification, with the remaining 14 finals places divided among the continental confederations.

Eight places were contested by UEFA teams (Europe) and three by CONMEBOL teams (South America). CAF teams (Africa), AFC teams (Asia), NAFC teams (North America), and CCCF teams (Central America and Caribbean) contested three play-offs slots. The three winners would then face a European or South American team for entry into the World Cup. The 1962 tournament was the last one for which only nations from Europe or the Americas qualified.

Two teams qualified for the first time ever: Colombia and Bulgaria.

Austria withdrew during the qualification tournament due to financial problems.

Canada withdrew during the qualification tournament due to scheduling constraints.

Italy, Switzerland and Uruguay all qualified for the first time since 1954, and Spain for the first time since 1950.

=== List of qualified teams ===
The following 16 teams qualified for the final tournament.

AFC (0)

- None qualified

CAF (0)

- None qualified

CONCACAF (1)

- Mexico

CONMEBOL (5)

- Argentina
- Brazil (holders)
- Chile (hosts)
- Colombia (debut)
- Uruguay

UEFA (10)

- Bulgaria (debut)
- Czechoslovakia
- England
- Hungary
- Italy
- Soviet Union
- Spain
- Switzerland
- West Germany
- Yugoslavia

== Venues ==
Originally, eight stadiums were selected to host the World Cup matches in eight cities: Santiago, Viña del Mar, Rancagua, Arica, Talca, Concepción, Talcahuano and Valdivia.

The Valdivia earthquake, the most powerful earthquake ever recorded, occurred on 22 May 1960. With over 50,000 casualties and more than 2 million people affected, the earthquake forced the organising committee to completely modify the World Cup's calendar. Talca, Concepción, Talcahuano and Valdivia were severely damaged and discarded as venues. Antofagasta and Valparaíso declined to host any matches as their venues were not financially self-sustainable. Viña del Mar and Arica managed to rebuild their stadiums while Braden Copper Company, then an American company that controlled the El Teniente copper mine, allowed the use of its stadium in Rancagua. Due to these setbacks, this is the World Cup edition with the smallest number of venues spread across the country (while the 1930 FIFA World Cup was held in three venues, all of them were located in a single city). The most used stadium was the Estadio Nacional in Santiago, with 10 matches; the Estadio Sausalito in Viña del Mar hosted 8 matches, and the stadiums in Rancagua and far-away Arica (the only location that was not close to the other cities) both hosted 7 matches. Being that Estadio Nacional was the only large venue of the tournament (all others had less than 20,000 seats), it also saw the largest attendance average, by far, with Estadio Sausalito's attendance only being boosted with the Brazil matches it hosted (the semi-final between Czechoslovakia and Yugoslavia was the only one in the stadium with less than 10,000 spectators).

Being largely concerned with the rebuilding of the country after the 1960 earthquake, government support for the tournament was minimal.

1962 FIFA World Cup is located in Chile	Santiago	Viña del Mar
1962 FIFA World Cup is located in Chile	Estadio Nacional	Estadio Sausalito
1962 FIFA World Cup is located in Chile	33°27′52″S 70°36′38″W	33°00′52″S 71°32′7″W
1962 FIFA World Cup is located in Chile	Capacity: 66,660	Capacity: 18,037
1962 FIFA World Cup is located in Chile	Rancagua	Arica
1962 FIFA World Cup is located in Chile	Estadio Braden Copper Co.	Estadio Carlos Dittborn
1962 FIFA World Cup is located in Chile	34°10′40″S 70°44′16″W	18°29′15″S 70°17′57″W
1962 FIFA World Cup is located in Chile	Capacity: 18,000	Capacity: 17,786

=== Team bases ===
Team	Site	City
Argentina	Hostería El Sauzal	Rancagua
Brazil	Villa Retiro	Quilpué
Bulgaria	Parque Municipal	Machalí
Chile	Villa del Seleccionado	Santiago
Colombia	Hotel El Morro	Arica
Czechoslovakia	Posada Quebrada Verde	Valparaíso
England	Staff House Braden Copper Co.	Coya, Cachapoal
Hungary	Hotel Turismo	Rengo
Italy	Escuela de Aviación Cap. Ávalos	Santiago
Mexico	Hotel O'Higgins	Viña del Mar
Soviet Union	Hostería Arica	Arica
Spain	Hotel Miramar Caleta Abarca	Viña del Mar
Switzerland	Club Suizo	Santiago
Uruguay	Hotel Azapa	Arica
West Germany	Escuela Militar Bernardo O'Higgins	Santiago
Yugoslavia	Hotel El Paso	Arica

== Squads ==
Squads for the 1962 World Cup consisted of 22 players, as for the previous tournament in 1958.

After Attilio Demaría and Luis Monti, who both represented Argentina in 1930 and Italy in 1934, Ferenc Puskás (Hungary in 1954, then Spain), José Santamaría (Uruguay in 1954, then Spain) and José Altafini (Brazil in 1958, then Italy) became the third, fourth and fifth players to play for two national teams in the World Cup. In light of this, FIFA created stipulations describing that once a player represents a nation during a World Cup or its qualifying rounds the player cannot switch to another national team. Robert Prosinečki and Robert Jarni would later become the sixth and seventh such players, playing for Yugoslavia in 1990, then for Croatia in 1998; Davor Šuker was also selected in both squads, but did not play in 1990. This was accepted by FIFA because Croatia was a newly independent former republic of Yugoslavia.

== Match officials ==
Eighteen match officials from 17 countries were assigned to the tournament to serve as referees and assistant referees.

Europe

- (Austria) Erich Steiner
- (Belgium) Arthur Blavier
- (England) Ken Aston
- (Spain) Juan Gardeazábal
- (France) Pierre Schwinte
- (West Germany) Albert Dusch
- (Hungary) Andor Dorogi
- (Italy) Cesare Jonni
- (Netherlands) Leo Horn
- (Scotland) Robert Holley Davidson
- (Switzerland) Gottfried Dienst
- (Czechoslovakia) Karol Galba
- (Soviet Union) Nikolay Latyshev
- (Socialist Federal Republic of Yugoslavia) Branko Tesanić

South America

- (Brazil) João Etzel Filho
- (Chile) Sergio Bustamante
- (Chile) Carlos Robles
- (Peru) Arturo Yamasaki

== Seeding ==
Pot 1: South America	Pot 2: Europe I	Pot 3: Europe II	Pot 4: Rest of the World
Chile (host nation); Brazil (defending champions); Argentina; Uruguay	Czechoslovakia; England; Soviet Union; West Germany	Italy; Hungary; Spain; Yugoslavia	Bulgaria; Colombia; Mexico; Switzerland

== Format ==
The format of the competition was similar to that of the 1958 competition: 16 teams qualified, divided into four groups of four. Four teams were seeded in the draw taking place in Santiago, on 18 January 1962: Brazil, England, Italy and Uruguay. The top two teams in each group advanced to the quarter-finals.

Two points were awarded for a win and one for a draw. In a change from the 1958 format, goal average was used to separate any teams equal on points. (In 1958, goal average was available, but was only between teams level on points in first place, or if a playoff between teams equal in second place failed to yield a result after extra time). Argentina became the first team in World Cup history to be eliminated on goal average when England advanced from Group 4 in second place.

In the knockout games, if the teams were level after ninety minutes, thirty minutes of extra time were played. For any match other than the final, if the teams were still even after extra time then lots would be drawn to determine the winner. The final would have been replayed if still tied after extra time; but if still tied after the replay, the champion would have been decided by drawing lots. In the event, no replays or drawing of lots were necessary.

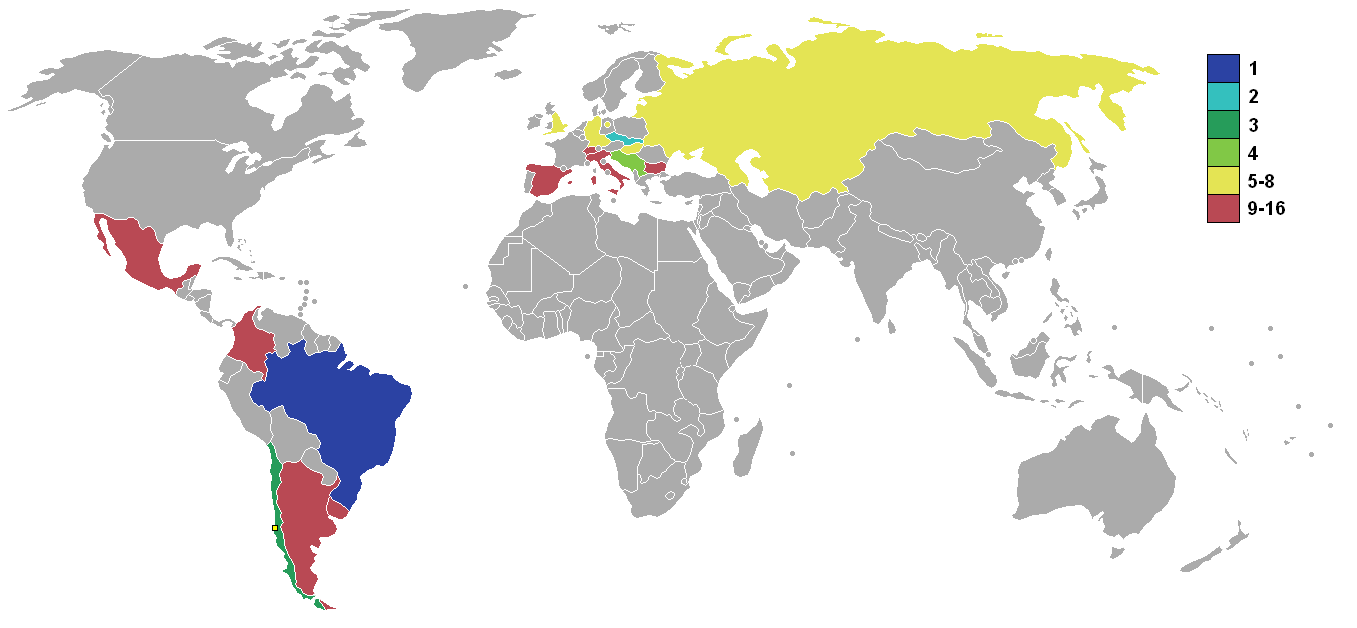
Qualifying countries and their result

== Summary ==
In May 1960, as the preparations were well under way, Chile suffered the largest earthquake ever recorded (9.5 magnitude), which caused enormous damage to the national infrastructure. In the face of this, Carlos Dittborn, the president of the Organization Committee, coined the phrase "Porque nada tenemos, lo haremos todo" (Because we have nothing, we will do everything). Stadia and other infrastructure were rebuilt at record speed and the tournament occurred on schedule with no major organisational flaw. Dittborn did not live to see the success of his efforts, as he died one month before the start of the tournament. The World Cup venue at Arica was named Estadio Carlos Dittborn in his honour and bears his name to this day. Even with these few and low-capacity stadiums Chile was able to meet the demand for seats as international travel to Chile, far-away from Europe, was minimal at the time.

President Jorge Alessandri gave an uninspiring inaugural speech before the first match, which was played between Chile and Switzerland. Alessandri left however before the end of the match. While Chilean society was living in a "footballized" atmosphere, Alessandri was criticised for his cold attitude towards the tournament, which forced his ministers to come out and claim he was as "footballized" as everybody else, but was too busy to devote too much attention to the competition.

Official 1962 FIFA World Cup poster.

The competition was marred by constant violence on the pitch. This poisonous atmosphere culminated in the first-round match between host Chile and Italy (2–0), known as the Battle of Santiago. Two Italian journalists had written unflattering articles about the host country and its capital city; describing Santiago as a "proudly backwards and poverty-stricken dump full of prostitution and crime". Although only two players (both of them Italian) were sent off by the English referee Ken Aston, the match saw repeated attempts from players on both sides to harm opponents, and the Italian team needed police protection to leave the field in safety. Articles in the Italian papers La Nazione and Corriere della Sera were saying that allowing Chile to host the World Cup was "pure madness"; this was used and magnified by local newspapers to inflame the Chilean population. The British newspaper the Daily Express wrote "The tournament shows every sign of developing into a violent bloodbath. Reports read like battlefront despatches; the Italy vs West Germany match was described as 'wrestling and warfare'".

As the competition began, a shift in strategy was imminent. Defensive strategies began to take hold as the average goals per match dropped to 2.78, under 3 for the first time in competition history (the average has never been above 3 since).

Pelé was injured in the second group match against Czechoslovakia. The Soviet Union goalkeeper Lev Yashin, arguably the best goalkeeper in the world at the time, was in poor form and his team went out to Chile (1–2) in the quarter-finals. Bright spots included the emergence of the young Brazilians Amarildo (standing in for Pelé) and Garrincha, the heroics of Czechoslovakia goalkeeper Viliam Schrojf against Hungary and Yugoslavia, and the performance of the host nation Chile, who took third place with a squad of relatively unknown players.. In doing so, Chile became the fourth and final South American nation so far in reaching the semi-final stage of a World Cup, after former two-time champions Uruguay, current holders Brazil, and 1930 finalists Argentina.

In the first round, Brazil topped their group with Czechoslovakia finishing second, above Mexico and Spain, even as the latter had in their ranks the naturalised Ferenc Puskás and Alfredo Di Stéfano who, injured, was called up but did not play. USSR and Yugoslavia finished above Uruguay and Colombia. Hungary, along with England progressed to the quarter-finals, while Argentina and Bulgaria were eliminated. England had the same number of points as Argentina but progressed due to a superior goal average; the first time such a requirement had been necessary in a World Cup finals tournament. Switzerland lost all three games while West Germany and Chile both went through over Italy.

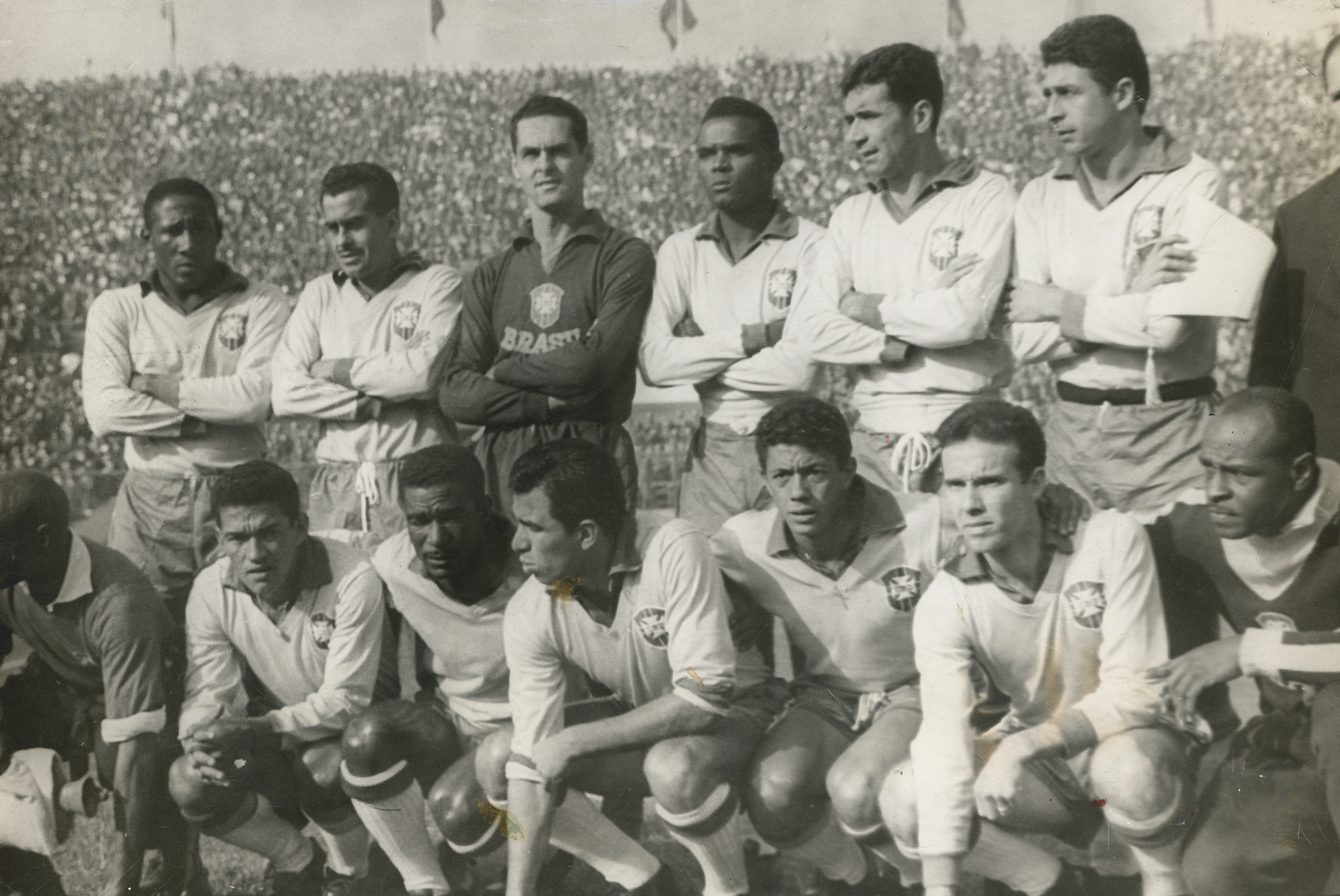
Brazil national football team in the World Cup, 1962. National Archives of Brazil.

Chile defeated European champions USSR to earn a semi-final game against the winner of the England – Brazil game. Garrincha scored two goals in a 3–1 win against England. Meanwhile, 1–0 wins for Yugoslavia against West Germany – and another 1–0 win of Czechoslovakia against neighbours Hungary – saw the two Slavic states meet in the semi-finals.

Viña del Mar was the original venue for the South American semi-final and Santiago for the Slavic one, but due to Chile's surprise qualification, the organisers prompted FIFA to switch the venues. This irritated crowds in Viña del Mar and only a little under 6,000 spectators came to Estadio Sausalito to watch Czechoslovakia beat Yugoslavia 3–1, whereas a capacity crowd of 76,600 in Santiago watched Brazil beat the hosts 4–2. This game saw Garrincha sent off for Brazil and Honorino Landa sent off for Chile. Chile eventually took third place in a 1–0 victory over Yugoslavia with the last play of the match. The same player, Eladio Rojas, had also scored the winning goal in Chile's game against USSR.

Santiago's Estadio Nacional served as the venue for the final, and after 15 minutes, Brazil again found themselves a goal behind in the World Cup final, as a long ball from Adolf Scherer was latched onto by Josef Masopust: 1–0 Czechoslovakia. As in the previous final in 1958, Brazil soon hit back, equalising two minutes later through Amarildo after an error by Czechoslovak goalkeeper Schroijf. The Brazilians scored goals from Zito and Vavá (another Schrojf error) midway through the second half, and the Czechoslovaks could not get back into the game. The match ended 3–1 to Brazil, a successful defence of the title for only the second time in the history of the competition in spite of the absence of one of their star players of 1958, Pelé, who was replaced by Amarildo.

== Group stage ==
=== Group 1 ===
Pos	Team	Pld	W	D	L	GF	GA	GR	Pts	Qualification
1	Soviet Union	3	2	1	0	8	5	1.600	5	Advance to knockout stage
2	Yugoslavia	3	2	0	1	8	3	2.667	4	Advance to knockout stage
3	Uruguay	3	1	0	2	4	6	0.667	2	
4	Colombia	3	0	1	2	5	11	0.455	1	

Source: FIFA
30 May 1962
15:00 CLT (UTC-04)

Uruguay	2–1	Colombia
Cubilla 56'; Sasía 75'		Zuluaga 19' (pen.)

Estadio Carlos Dittborn, Arica
Attendance: 7,908
Referee: Andor Dorogi (Hungary)
31 May 1962
15:00 CLT (UTC-04)

Soviet Union	2–0	Yugoslavia
Ivanov 51'; Ponedelnik 83'

Estadio Carlos Dittborn, Arica
Attendance: 9,622
Referee: Albert Dusch (West Germany)

2 June 1962
15:00 CLT (UTC-04)

Yugoslavia	3–1	Uruguay
Skoblar 25' (pen.); Galić 29'; Jerković 49'		Cabrera 19'

Estadio Carlos Dittborn, Arica
Attendance: 8,829
Referee: Karol Galba (Czechoslovakia)
3 June 1962
15:00 CLT (UTC-04)

Soviet Union	4–4	Colombia
Ivanov 8', 11'; Chislenko 10'; Ponedelnik 56'		Aceros 21'; Coll 68'; Rada 72'; Klinger 86'

Estadio Carlos Dittborn, Arica
Attendance: 8,040
Referee: João Etzel Filho (Brazil)

6 June 1962
15:00 CLT (UTC-04)

Soviet Union	2–1	Uruguay
Mamykin 38'; Ivanov 89'		Sasía 54'

Estadio Carlos Dittborn, Arica
Attendance: 9,973
Referee: Cesare Jonni (Italy)
7 June 1962
15:00 CLT (UTC-04)

Yugoslavia	5–0	Colombia
Galić 20'; Jerković 25', 61', 87'; Melić 82'

Estadio Carlos Dittborn, Arica
Attendance: 7,167
Referee: Carlos Robles (Chile)

=== Group 2 ===
Pos	Team	Pld	W	D	L	GF	GA	GR	Pts	Qualification
1	West Germany	3	2	1	0	4	1	4.000	5	Advance to knockout stage
2	Chile	3	2	0	1	5	3	1.667	4	Advance to knockout stage
3	Italy	3	1	1	1	3	2	1.500	3	
4	Switzerland	3	0	0	3	2	8	0.250	0	

Source: FIFA
30 May 1962
15:00 CLT (UTC-04)

Chile	3–1	Switzerland
L. Sánchez 44', 55'; Ramírez 51'		Wüthrich 6'

Estadio Nacional, Santiago
Attendance: 65,006
Referee: Kenneth Aston (England)
31 May 1962
15:00 CLT (UTC-04)

West Germany	0–0	Italy

Estadio Nacional, Santiago
Attendance: 65,440
Referee: Robert Holley Davidson (Scotland)

2 June 1962
15:00 CLT (UTC-04)

Chile	2–0	Italy
Ramírez 73'; Toro 87'

Estadio Nacional, Santiago
Attendance: 66,057
Referee: Kenneth Aston (England)
3 June 1962
15:00 CLT (UTC-04)

West Germany	2–1	Switzerland
Brülls 45'; Seeler 59'		Schneiter 73'

Estadio Nacional, Santiago
Attendance: 64,922
Referee: Leo Horn (Netherlands)

6 June 1962
15:00 CLT (UTC-04)

West Germany	2–0	Chile
Szymaniak 21' (pen.); Seeler 82'

Estadio Nacional, Santiago
Attendance: 67,224
Referee: Robert Holley Davidson (Scotland)
7 June 1962
15:00 CLT (UTC-04)

Italy	3–0	Switzerland
Mora 2'; Bulgarelli 65', 67'

Estadio Nacional, Santiago
Attendance: 59,828
Referee: Nikolay Latyshev (Soviet Union)

=== Group 3 ===
Pos	Team	Pld	W	D	L	GF	GA	GR	Pts	Qualification
1	Brazil	3	2	1	0	4	1	4.000	5	Advance to knockout stage
2	Czechoslovakia	3	1	1	1	2	3	0.667	3	Advance to knockout stage
3	Mexico	3	1	0	2	3	4	0.750	2 (Note: Mexico finished ahead of Spain on goal average.)	
4	Spain	3	1	0	2	2	3	0.667	2	

Source: FIFA
Notes:
30 May 1962
15:00 CLT (UTC-04)

Brazil	2–0	Mexico
Zagallo 56'; Pelé 73'

Estadio Sausalito, Viña del Mar
Attendance: 10,484
Referee: Gottfried Dienst (Switzerland)
31 May 1962
15:00 CLT (UTC-04)

Czechoslovakia	1–0	Spain
Štibrányi 80'

Estadio Sausalito, Viña del Mar
Attendance: 12,700
Referee: Carl Erich Steiner (Austria)

2 June 1962
15:00 CLT (UTC-04)

Brazil	0–0	Czechoslovakia

Estadio Sausalito, Viña del Mar
Attendance: 14,903
Referee: Pierre Schwinte (France)
3 June 1962
15:00 CLT (UTC-04)

Spain	1–0	Mexico
Peiró 90'

Estadio Sausalito, Viña del Mar
Attendance: 11,875
Referee: Branko Tesanić (Yugoslavia)

6 June 1962
15:00 CLT (UTC-04)

Brazil	2–1	Spain
Amarildo 72', 86'		Adelardo 35'

Estadio Sausalito, Viña del Mar
Attendance: 18,715
Referee: Sergio Bustamante (Chile)
7 June 1962
15:00 CLT (UTC-04)

Mexico	3–1	Czechoslovakia
Díaz 12'; Del Águila 29'; Hernández 90' (pen.)		Mašek 1'

Estadio Sausalito, Viña del Mar
Attendance: 10,648
Referee: Gottfried Dienst (Switzerland)

=== Group 4 ===
Pos	Team	Pld	W	D	L	GF	GA	GR	Pts	Qualification
1	Hungary	3	2	1	0	8	2	4.000	5	Advance to knockout stage
2	England	3	1	1	1	4	3	1.333	3 (Note: England finished ahead of Argentina on goal average.)	Advance to knockout stage
3	Argentina	3	1	1	1	2	3	0.667	3	
4	Bulgaria	3	0	1	2	1	7	0.143	1	

Source: FIFA
Notes:
30 May 1962
15:00 CLT (UTC-04)

Argentina	1–0	Bulgaria
Facundo 4'

Estadio El Teniente, Rancagua
Attendance: 7,134
Referee: Juan Gardeazábal Garay (Spain)
31 May 1962
15:00 CLT (UTC-04)

Hungary	2–1	England
Tichy 17'; Albert 71'		Flowers 60' (pen.)

Estadio El Teniente, Rancagua
Attendance: 7,938
Referee: Leo Horn (Netherlands)

2 June 1962
15:00 CLT (UTC-04)

England	3–1	Argentina
Flowers 17' (pen.); Charlton 42'; Greaves 67'		Sanfilippo 81'

Estadio El Teniente, Rancagua
Attendance: 9,794
Referee: Nikolay Latyshev (Soviet Union)
3 June 1962
15:00 CLT (UTC-04)

Hungary	6–1	Bulgaria
Albert 1', 6', 53'; Tichy 8', 70'; Solymosi 12'		Sokolov 64' (Note: RSSSF credits this goal to Georgi Asparuhov.)

Estadio El Teniente, Rancagua
Attendance: 7,442
Referee: Juan Gardeazábal Garay (Spain)

6 June 1962
15:00 CLT (UTC-04)

Hungary	0–0	Argentina

Estadio El Teniente, Rancagua
Attendance: 7,945
Referee: Arturo Yamasaki Maldonado (Peru)
7 June 1962
15:00 CLT (UTC-04)

England	0–0	Bulgaria

Estadio El Teniente, Rancagua
Attendance: 5,700
Referee: Antoine Blavier (Belgium)

== Knockout stage ==
=== Bracket ===
Quarter-finals
10 June – Arica
Soviet Union	1
Chile	2
10 June – Viña del Mar
Brazil	3
England	1
10 June – Santiago
West Germany	0
Yugoslavia	1
10 June – Rancagua
Hungary	0
Czechoslovakia	1

Semi-finals
13 June – Santiago
Chile	2
Brazil	4
13 June – Viña del Mar
Yugoslavia	1
Czechoslovakia	3

Final
17 June – Santiago
Brazil	3
Czechoslovakia	1
Match for third place
16 June – Santiago
Chile	1
Yugoslavia	0

=== Quarter-finals ===
10 June 1962
14:30 CLT (UTC-04)

Chile	2–1	Soviet Union
L. Sánchez 11'; Rojas 29'		Chislenko 26'

Estadio Carlos Dittborn, Arica
Attendance: 17,268
Referee: Leo Horn (Netherlands)

10 June 1962
14:30 CLT (UTC-04)

Czechoslovakia	1–0	Hungary
Scherer 13'

Estadio El Teniente, Rancagua
Attendance: 11,690
Referee: Nikolay Latyshev (Soviet Union)

10 June 1962
14:30 CLT (UTC-04)

Brazil	3–1	England
Garrincha 31', 59'; Vavá 53'		Hitchens 38'

Estadio Sausalito, Viña del Mar
Attendance: 17,736
Referee: Pierre Schwinte (France)

10 June 1962
14:30 CLT (UTC-04)

Yugoslavia	1–0	West Germany
Radaković 85'

Estadio Nacional, Santiago
Attendance: 63,324
Referee: Arturo Yamasaki Maldonado (Peru)

=== Semi-finals ===
13 June 1962
14:30 CLT (UTC-04)

Czechoslovakia	3–1	Yugoslavia
Kadraba 48'; Scherer 80', 84' (pen.)		Jerković 69'

Estadio Sausalito, Viña del Mar
Attendance: 5,890
Referee: Gottfried Dienst (Switzerland)

13 June 1962
14:30 CLT (UTC-04)

Brazil	4–2	Chile
Garrincha 9', 32'; Vavá 47', 78'		Toro 42'; L. Sánchez 61' (pen.)

Estadio Nacional, Santiago
Attendance: 76,594
Referee: Arturo Yamasaki Maldonado (Peru)

=== Match for third place ===
16 June 1962
14:30 CLT (UTC-04)

Chile	1–0	Yugoslavia
Rojas 90'

Estadio Nacional, Santiago
Attendance: 66,697
Referee: Juan Gardeazábal Garay (Spain)

=== Final ===
17 June 1962
14:30 CLT (UTC-04)

Brazil	3–1	Czechoslovakia
Amarildo 17'; Zito 69'; Vavá 78'		Masopust 15'

Estadio Nacional, Santiago
Attendance: 68,679
Referee: Nikolay Latyshev (Soviet Union)

== Statistics ==
=== Goalscorers ===
With four goals each, Flórián Albert, Garrincha, Valentin Ivanov, Dražan Jerković, Leonel Sánchez and Vavá were the top scorers in the tournament. In total, 89 goals were scored by 54 players, with none of them credited as own goal.

4 goals

- (Brazil) Garrincha
- (Brazil) Vavá
- (Chile) Leonel Sánchez
- (Hungary) Flórián Albert
- (Soviet Union) Valentin Ivanov
- (Socialist Federal Republic of Yugoslavia) Dražan Jerković

3 goals

- (Brazil) Amarildo
- (Czechoslovakia) Adolf Scherer
- (Hungary) Lajos Tichy
- (Socialist Federal Republic of Yugoslavia) Milan Galić

2 goals

- (Chile) Jaime Ramírez
- (Chile) Eladio Rojas
- (Chile) Jorge Toro
- (England) Ron Flowers
- (Italy) Giacomo Bulgarelli
- (Soviet Union) Igor Chislenko
- (Soviet Union) Viktor Ponedelnik
- (Uruguay) José Sasía
- (West Germany) Uwe Seeler

1 goal

- (Argentina) Héctor Facundo
- (Argentina) José Sanfilippo
- (Brazil) Pelé
- (Brazil) Mário Zagallo
- (Brazil) Zito
- (Bulgaria) Georgi Sokolov
- (Colombia) Germán Aceros
- (Colombia) Marcos Coll
- (Colombia) Marino Klinger
- (Colombia) Antonio Rada
- (Colombia) Francisco Zuluaga
- (Czechoslovakia) Josef Kadraba
- (Czechoslovakia) Václav Mašek
- (Czechoslovakia) Josef Masopust
- (Czechoslovakia) Jozef Štibrányi
- (England) Bobby Charlton
- (England) Jimmy Greaves
- (England) Gerry Hitchens
- (Hungary) Ernő Solymosi
- (Italy) Bruno Mora
- (Mexico) Alfredo del Águila
- (Mexico) Isidoro Díaz
- (Mexico) Héctor Hernández
- (Soviet Union) Aleksei Mamykin
- (Spain) Adelardo
- (Spain) Joaquín Peiró
- (Switzerland) Heinz Schneiter
- (Switzerland) Rolf Wüthrich
- (Uruguay) Ángel Cabrera
- (Uruguay) Luis Cubilla
- (West Germany) Albert Brülls
- (West Germany) Horst Szymaniak
- (Socialist Federal Republic of Yugoslavia) Vojislav Melić
- (Socialist Federal Republic of Yugoslavia) Petar Radaković
- (Socialist Federal Republic of Yugoslavia) Josip Skoblar

=== Team of the Tournament ===
FIFA selected the following players for the 1962 FIFA World Cup All-Star Team.

Goalkeeper	Defenders	Midfielders	Forwards
(Czech Republic) Viliam Schrojf	(Brazil) Djalma Santos (Italy) Cesare Maldini (Germany) Karl-Heinz Schnellinger	(Soviet Union) Valery Voronin (Czech Republic) Josef Masopust (Brazil) Zito	(Brazil) Garrincha (Chile) Leonel Sánchez (Brazil) Vavá (Brazil) Mário Zagallo

=== Tournament ranking ===
In 1986, FIFA published a report that ranked all teams in each World Cup up to and including 1986, based on progress in the competition and overall results. The rankings for the 1962 tournament were as follows:

Per statistical convention in football, matches decided in extra time are counted as wins and losses.

Pos	Grp	Team	Pld	W	D	L	GF	GA	GD	Pts	Final result
1	3	Brazil	6	5	1	0	14	5	+9	11	Champions
2	3	Czechoslovakia	6	3	1	2	7	7	0	7	Runners-up
3	2	Chile (H)	6	4	0	2	10	8	+2	8	Third place
4	1	Yugoslavia	6	3	0	3	10	7	+3	6	Fourth place
5	4	Hungary	4	2	1	1	8	3	+5	5	Eliminated in quarter-finals
6	1	Soviet Union	4	2	1	1	9	7	+2	5	Eliminated in quarter-finals
7	2	West Germany	4	2	1	1	4	2	+2	5	Eliminated in quarter-finals
8	4	England	4	1	1	2	5	6	−1	3	Eliminated in quarter-finals
9	2	Italy	3	1	1	1	3	2	+1	3	Eliminated in group stage
10	4	Argentina	3	1	1	1	2	3	−1	3	Eliminated in group stage
11	3	Mexico	3	1	0	2	3	4	−1	2	Eliminated in group stage
12	1	Uruguay	3	1	0	2	4	6	−2	2 (Note: FIFA ranks Uruguay above Spain in the standings as Uruguay finished third in their group, while Spain finished fourth.)	Eliminated in group stage
13	3	Spain	3	1	0	2	2	3	−1	2	Eliminated in group stage
14	1	Colombia	3	0	1	2	5	11	−6	1	Eliminated in group stage
15	4	Bulgaria	3	0	1	2	1	7	−6	1	Eliminated in group stage
16	2	Switzerland	3	0	0	3	2	8	−6	0	Eliminated in group stage

Source: FIFA
(H) Hosts
