= 1950 FIFA World Cup Group 2 =

Football tournament group stage

Group 2 of the 1950 FIFA World Cup took place from 25 June to 2 July 1950. The group consisted of England, Spain, Chile, and the United States. The group winners advanced to the final round.

== Standings ==
| Pos | Team | Pld | W | D | L | GF | GA | GD | Pts | Qualification |
|---|---|---|---|---|---|---|---|---|---|---|
| 1 | Spain | 3 | 3 | 0 | 0 | 6 | 1 | +5 | 6 | Advance to final round |
| 2 | England | 3 | 1 | 0 | 2 | 2 | 2 | 0 | 2 | |
| 2 | Chile | 3 | 1 | 0 | 2 | 5 | 6 | −1 | 2 | |
| 2 | United States | 3 | 1 | 0 | 2 | 4 | 8 | −4 | 2 | |

Source: FIFA
Rules for classification: Tiebreakers

== Matches ==
All times listed are local time.

=== England vs Chile ===
25 June 1950
15:00 BRT (UTC-3)

| England | 2–0 | Chile |
|---|---|---|
| Mortensen 39'; Mannion 51' |

Estádio do Maracanã, Rio de Janeiro
Attendance: 29,703
Referee: Karel van der Meer (Netherlands)

England
Chile

| GK | Bert Williams |
| RB | Alf Ramsey |
| LB | John Aston |
| RH | Billy Wright (c) |
| CH | Laurie Hughes |
| LH | Jimmy Dickinson |
| OR | Tom Finney |
| IR | Stan Mortensen |
| CF | Roy Bentley |
| IL | Wilf Mannion |
| OL | Jimmy Mullen |
Manager:
Walter Winterbottom

| GK | Sergio Livingstone (c) |
| RB | Arturo Farías |
| CB | Manuel Álvarez |
| LB | Fernando Roldán |
| RH | Miguel Busquets |
| LH | Hernán Carvallo |
| OR | Luis Mayanés |
| IR | George Robledo |
| CF | Atilio Cremaschi |
| IL | Manuel Muñoz |
| OL | Guillermo Díaz |
Manager:
Alberto Buccicardi

=== Spain vs United States ===
25 June 1950
15:00 BRT (UTC-3)

| Spain | 3–1 | United States |
|---|---|---|
| Igoa 81'; Basora 83'; Zarra 89' | | Pariani 17' |

Estádio Vila Capanema, Curitiba
Attendance: 9,511
Referee: Mário Vianna (Brazil)

Spain
United States

| GK | Ignacio Eizaguirre (c) |
| RB | Gabriel Alonso |
| CB | Francisco Antúnez |
| LB | José Gonzalvo |
| RH | Mariano Gonzalvo |
| LH | Antonio Puchades |
| OR | Estanislao Basora |
| IR | Rosendo Hernández |
| CF | Telmo Zarra |
| IL | Silvestre Igoa |
| OL | Agustín Gaínza |
Manager:
Guillermo Eizaguirre

| GK | Frank Borghi |
| RB | Harry Keough (c) |
| LB | Joe Maca |
| RH | Ed McIlvenny |
| CH | Charlie Colombo |
| LH | Walter Bahr |
| OR | Robert Craddock |
| IR | John Souza |
| CF | Joe Gaetjens |
| IL | Gino Pariani |
| OL | Adam Wolanin |
Manager:
William Jeffrey

=== Spain vs Chile ===
29 June 1950
15:00 BRT (UTC-3)

| Spain | 2–0 | Chile |
|---|---|---|
| Basora 17'; Zarra 30' |

Estádio do Maracanã, Rio de Janeiro
Attendance: 19,790
Referee: Alberto Malcher (Brazil)

Spain
Chile

| GK | Antoni Ramallets |
| RB | Gabriel Alonso |
| CB | José Parra |
| LB | José Gonzalvo |
| RH | Mariano Gonzalvo |
| LH | Antonio Puchades |
| OR | Estanislao Basora |
| IR | José Luis Panizo |
| CF | Telmo Zarra |
| IL | Silvestre Igoa |
| OL | Agustín Gaínza (c) |
Manager:
Guillermo Eizaguirre

| GK | Sergio Livingstone (c) |
| RB | Arturo Farías |
| CB | Manuel Álvarez |
| LB | Fernando Roldán |
| RH | Miguel Busquets |
| LH | Hernán Carvallo |
| OR | Andrés Prieto |
| IR | George Robledo |
| CF | Atilio Cremaschi |
| IL | Manuel Muñoz |
| OL | Guillermo Díaz |
Manager:
Alberto Buccicardi

=== United States vs England ===
29 June 1950
15:00 BRT (UTC-3)

| United States | 1–0 | England |
|---|---|---|
| Gaetjens 38' |

Estádio Independência, Belo Horizonte
Attendance: 10,151
Referee: Generoso Dattilo (Italy)

| United States | England |

| GK | Frank Borghi |
| RB | Harry Keough |
| LB | Joe Maca |
| RH | Ed McIlvenny (c) |
| CH | Charlie Colombo |
| LH | Walter Bahr |
| OR | Frank Wallace |
| IR | Gino Pariani |
| CF | Joe Gaetjens |
| IL | John Souza |
| OL | Ed Souza |
Manager:
William Jeffrey

| GK | Bert Williams |
| RB | Alf Ramsey |
| LB | John Aston |
| WH | Billy Wright (c) |
| CH | Laurie Hughes |
| WH | Jimmy Dickinson |
| OR | Tom Finney |
| IF | Wilf Mannion |
| CF | Roy Bentley |
| IF | Stan Mortensen |
| OL | Jimmy Mullen |
Manager:
Walter Winterbottom

Assistant referees:
Charles de la Salle (France)
Giovanni Galeati (Italy)

=== Spain vs England ===
2 July 1950
15:00 BRT (UTC-3)

| Spain | 1–0 | England |
|---|---|---|
| Zarra 48' |

Estádio do Maracanã, Rio de Janeiro
Attendance: 74,462
Referee: Giovanni Galeati (Italy)

Spain
England

| GK | Antoni Ramallets |
| RB | Gabriel Alonso |
| CB | José Parra |
| LB | José Gonzalvo |
| RH | Mariano Gonzalvo |
| LH | Antonio Puchades |
| OR | Estanislao Basora |
| IR | José Luis Panizo |
| CF | Telmo Zarra |
| IL | Silvestre Igoa |
| OL | Agustín Gaínza (c) |
Manager:
Guillermo Eizaguirre

| GK | Bert Williams |
| RB | Alf Ramsey |
| LB | Bill Eckersley |
| RH | Billy Wright (c) |
| CH | Laurie Hughes |
| LH | Jimmy Dickinson |
| OR | Stanley Matthews |
| IR | Stan Mortensen |
| CF | Jackie Milburn |
| IL | Eddie Baily |
| OL | Tom Finney |
Manager:
Walter Winterbottom

=== Chile vs United States ===
2 July 1950
15:00 BRT (UTC-3)

| Chile | 5–2 | United States |
|---|---|---|
| Robledo 16'; Cremaschi 32', 60'; Prieto 54'; Riera 82' | | Wallace 47'; Maca 48' (pen.) |

Estádio Ilha do Retiro, Recife
Attendance: 8,501
Referee: Mário Gardelli (Brazil)

| Chile | United States |

| GK | Sergio Livingstone (c) |
| RB | Arturo Farías |
| CB | Manuel Álvarez |
| LB | Manuel Machuca |
| RH | Miguel Busquets |
| LH | Carlos Rojas |
| OR | Fernando Riera |
| IR | Andrés Prieto |
| CF | Atilio Cremaschi |
| IL | George Robledo |
| OL | Carlos Ibáñez |
Manager:
Alberto Buccicardi

| GK | Frank Borghi |
| RB | Harry Keough |
| LB | Joe Maca |
| RH | Ed McIlvenny |
| CH | Charlie Colombo |
| LH | Walter Bahr (c) |
| OR | Frank Wallace |
| IR | Gino Pariani |
| CF | Joe Gaetjens |
| IL | John Souza |
| OL | Ed Souza |
Manager:
William Jeffrey

== See also ==
- Chile at the FIFA World Cup
- England at the FIFA World Cup
- Spain at the FIFA World Cup
- United States at the FIFA World Cup
