= United States at the FIFA World Cup =

International football delegation

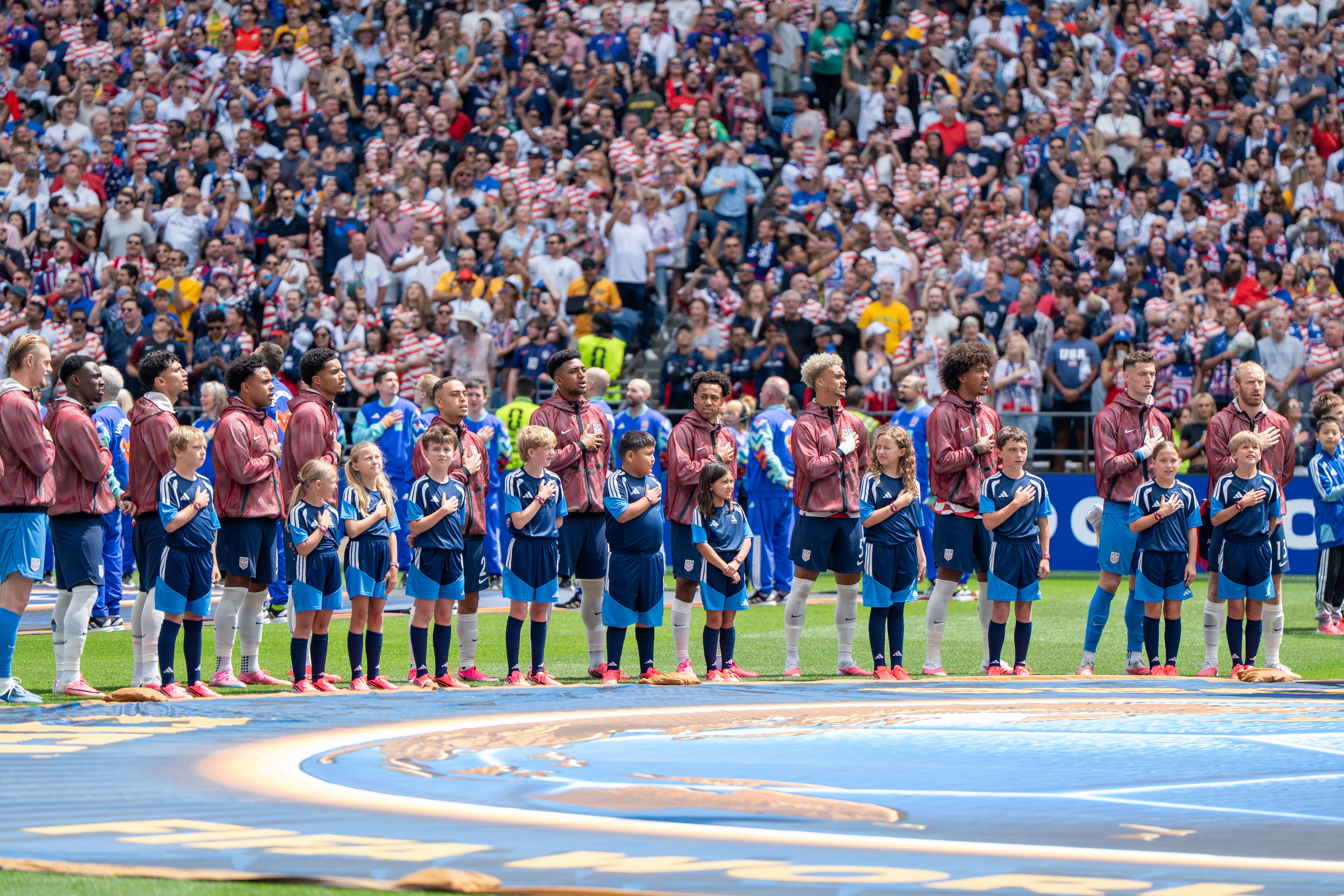
The United States during the national anthem at Lumen Field in the 2026 FIFA World Cup.

The United States men's national soccer team (USMNT) has participated in twelve editions of the FIFA World Cup, an international soccer competition contested by men's national teams representing members of FIFA. The tournament is held every four years by the top qualifying teams from the continental confederations under FIFA. The United States is a member of CONCACAF, which governs the sport in North America, Central America, and the Caribbean, and has the second-most World Cup appearances from the confederation behind Mexico.

The United States participated in the inaugural World Cup in 1930 and finished in the semifinals, which was later declared a third-place finish, their best result to date and the best-ever result for a non-European and non-South American nation. The tournament also featured the first hat-trick scored at a World Cup, awarded to American striker Bert Patenaude following recognition by FIFA in 2006. After the 1950 World Cup, in which the United States upset England in group play 1–0, the U.S. was absent from the tournament until 1990. The United States participated in every World Cup from 1990 through 2014, but did not qualify in 2018, marking the first time the team had missed a World Cup since 1986. They returned to the World Cup by qualifying for the 2022 edition and hosted the World Cup for the second time in 2026.

== Overall record ==
FIFA World Cup record										Qualification record					
Year	Result	Position	Pld	W	D	L	GF	GA	Squad	Pld	W	D	L	GF	GA
(Uruguay) 1930	Third place (Note: The United States earned 3rd place over the loser of the other semifinal, Yugoslavia, because of a better goal differential (+1 to Yugoslavia's 0). No third place match was played. "1930 FIFA World Cup Uruguay 1930". FIFA.com.)	3rd	3	2	0	1	7	6	Squad	Qualified as invitees					
(Italy) 1934	Round of 16	16th	1	0	0	1	1	7	Squad	1	1	0	0	4	2
(France) 1938	Withdrew									Withdrew					
(Brazil) 1950	Group stage	10th	3	1	0	2	4	8	Squad	4	1	1	2	8	15
(Switzerland) 1954	Did not qualify									4	2	0	2	7	9
(Sweden) 1958	Did not qualify									4	0	0	4	5	21
(Chile) 1962	Did not qualify									2	0	1	1	3	6
(England) 1966	Did not qualify									4	1	2	1	4	5
(Mexico) 1970	Did not qualify									6	3	0	3	11	9
(West Germany) 1974	Did not qualify									4	0	1	3	6	10
(Argentina) 1978	Did not qualify									5	1	2	2	3	7
(Spain) 1982	Did not qualify									4	1	1	2	4	8
(Mexico) 1986	Did not qualify									6	3	2	1	8	3
(Italy) 1990	Group stage	23rd	3	0	0	3	2	8	Squad	10	5	4	1	11	4
(United States) 1994	Round of 16	14th	4	1	1	2	3	4	Squad	Qualified as hosts					
(France) 1998	Group stage	32nd	3	0	0	3	1	5	Squad	16	8	6	2	27	14
(South Korea) (Japan) 2002	Quarter-finals	8th	5	2	1	2	7	7	Squad	16	8	4	4	25	11
(Germany) 2006	Group stage	25th	3	0	1	2	2	6	Squad	18	12	4	2	35	11
(South Africa) 2010	Round of 16	12th	4	1	2	1	5	5	Squad	18	13	2	3	42	16
(Brazil) 2014	Round of 16	15th	4	1	1	2	5	6	Squad	16	11	2	3	26	14
(Russia) 2018	Did not qualify									16	7	4	5	37	16
(Qatar) 2022	Round of 16	14th	4	1	2	1	3	4	Squad	14	7	4	3	21	10
(Canada) (Mexico) (United States) 2026	Round of 16	12th	5	3	0	2	11	8	Squad	Qualified as co-hosts					
(Morocco) (Portugal) (Spain) 2030	To be determined									To be determined					
(Saudi Arabia) 2034	To be determined									To be determined					
Total	Third place	12/23	42	12	8	22	51	74	—	168	84	40	44	287	191

*Draws include knockout matches decided via penalty shoot-out

United States' World Cup record
First match	United States 3–0 Belgium (July 13, 1930; Montevideo, Uruguay)
Biggest win	United States 3–0 Belgium (July 13, 1930; Montevideo, Uruguay); United States 3–0 Paraguay (July 17, 1930; Montevideo, Uruguay); United States 4–1 Paraguay (June 12, 2026; Inglewood, United States)
Biggest defeat	Italy 7–1 United States (May 27, 1934; Rome, Italy)
Best result	Semi-finals in 1930 (0 titles)
Worst result	Group stage in 1934, 1950, 1990, 1998 and 2006

=== By match ===
World Cup	Round	Opponent	Score	Result	Location	USA scorers
(Uruguay) 1930	Group 4	Belgium	3–0	W	Montevideo	B. McGhee, T. Florie, B. Patenaude
(Uruguay) 1930	Group 4	Paraguay	3–0	W	Montevideo	B. Patenaude (3)
(Uruguay) 1930	Semifinals	Argentina	1–6	L	Montevideo	J. Brown
(Italy) 1934	Round of 16	Italy	1–7	L	Rome	A. Donelli
(Brazil) 1950	Group 2	Spain	1–3	L	Curitiba	G. Pariani
(Brazil) 1950	Group 2	England	1–0	W	Belo Horizonte	J. Gaetjens
(Brazil) 1950	Group 2	Chile	2–5	L	Recife	F. Wallace, J. Maca
(Italy) 1990	Group A	Czechoslovakia	1–5	L	Florence	P. Caligiuri
(Italy) 1990	Group A	Italy	0–1	L	Rome	—
(Italy) 1990	Group A	Austria	1–2	L	Florence	B. Murray
(United States) 1994	Group A	Switzerland	1–1	D	Pontiac	E. Wynalda
(United States) 1994	Group A	Colombia	2–1	W	Pasadena	A. Escobar (o.g.), E. Stewart
(United States) 1994	Group A	Romania	0–1	L	Pasadena	—
(United States) 1994	Round of 16	Brazil	0–1	L	Stanford	—
(France) 1998	Group F	Germany	0–2	L	Paris	—
(France) 1998	Group F	Iran	1–2	L	Lyon	B. McBride
(France) 1998	Group F	FR Yugoslavia	0–1	L	Nantes	—
(South Korea) (Japan) 2002	Group D	Portugal	3–2	W	Suwon	J. O'Brien, J. Costa (o.g.), B. McBride
(South Korea) (Japan) 2002	Group D	South Korea	1–1	D	Daegu	C. Mathis
(South Korea) (Japan) 2002	Group D	Poland	1–3	L	Daejeon	L. Donovan
(South Korea) (Japan) 2002	Round of 16	Mexico	2–0	W	Jeonju	B. McBride, L. Donovan
(South Korea) (Japan) 2002	Quarterfinals	Germany	0–1	L	Ulsan	—
(Germany) 2006	Group E	Czech Republic	0–3	L	Gelsenkirchen	—
(Germany) 2006	Group E	Italy	1–1	D	Kaiserslautern	C. Zaccardo (o.g.)
(Germany) 2006	Group E	Ghana	1–2	L	Nuremberg	C. Dempsey
(South Africa) 2010	Group C	England	1–1	D	Rustenburg	C. Dempsey
(South Africa) 2010	Group C	Slovenia	2–2	D	Johannesburg	L. Donovan, M. Bradley
(South Africa) 2010	Group C	Algeria	1–0	W	Pretoria	L. Donovan
(South Africa) 2010	Round of 16	Ghana	1–2 (a.e.t.)	L	Rustenburg	L. Donovan
(Brazil) 2014	Group G	Ghana	2–1	W	Natal	C. Dempsey, J. Brooks
(Brazil) 2014	Group G	Portugal	2–2	D	Manaus	J. Jones, C. Dempsey
(Brazil) 2014	Group G	Germany	0–1	L	Recife	—
(Brazil) 2014	Round of 16	Belgium	1–2 (a.e.t.)	L	Salvador	J. Green
(Qatar) 2022	Group B	Wales	1–1	D	Al Rayyan	T. Weah
(Qatar) 2022	Group B	England	0–0	D	Al Khor	—
(Qatar) 2022	Group B	Iran	1–0	W	Doha	C. Pulisic
(Qatar) 2022	Round of 16	Netherlands	1–3	L	Al Rayyan	H. Wright
(Canada) (Mexico) (United States) 2026	Group D	Paraguay	4–1	W	Inglewood	D. Bobadilla (o.g.), F. Balogun (2), G. Reyna
(Canada) (Mexico) (United States) 2026	Group D	Australia	2–0	W	Seattle	C. Burgess (o.g.), A. Freeman
(Canada) (Mexico) (United States) 2026	Group D	Turkey	2–3	L	Inglewood	A. Trusty, S. Berhalter
(Canada) (Mexico) (United States) 2026	Round of 32	Bosnia and Herzegovina	2–0	W	Santa Clara	F. Balogun, M. Tillman
(Canada) (Mexico) (United States) 2026	Round of 16	Belgium	1–4	L	Seattle	M. Tillman

== Results ==
=== Uruguay 1930 ===
==== Group stage ====
Pos	Team	Pld	W	D	L	GF	GA	GD	Pts	Qualification
1	United States	2	2	0	0	6	0	+6	4	Advance to the knockout stage
2	Paraguay	2	1	0	1	1	3	−2	2	
3	Belgium	2	0	0	2	0	4	−4	0	

Source: ESPN

All times local (UYT)

July 13, 1930
15:00

United States	3–0	Belgium
McGhee 23'; Florie 45'; Patenaude 69'	Report

Estadio Parque Central, Montevideo
Attendance: 18,346
Referee: José Macías (Argentina)

July 17, 1930
14:45

United States	3–0	Paraguay
Patenaude 10', 15', 50'	Report

Estadio Parque Central, Montevideo
Attendance: 18,306
Referee: José Macías (Argentina)

==== Semifinals ====
July 26, 1930
14:45

Argentina	6–1	United States
Monti 20'; Scopelli 56'; Stábile 69', 87'; Peucelle 80', 85'	Report	Brown 89'

Estadio Centenario, Montevideo
Attendance: 72,886
Referee: John Langenus (Belgium)

=== Italy 1934 ===
==== Round of 16 ====
May 27, 1934
16:30 (CEST)

Italy	7–1	United States
Schiavio 18', 29', 64'; Orsi 20', 69'; Ferrari 63'; Meazza 90'	Report	Donelli 57'

Stadio Nazionale PNF, Rome
Attendance: 25,000
Referee: René Mercet (Switzerland)

=== Brazil 1950 ===
==== Group stage ====
Pos	Team	Pld	W	D	L	GF	GA	GD	Pts	Qualification
1	Spain	3	3	0	0	6	1	+5	6	Advance to final round
2	England	3	1	0	2	2	2	0	2	
2	Chile	3	1	0	2	5	6	−1	2	
2	United States	3	1	0	2	4	8	−4	2	

Source: FIFA
Rules for classification: Tiebreakers

All times local BRT (UTC-03)

June 25, 1950
15:00

Spain	3–1	United States
Igoa 81'; Basora 83'; Zarra 89'	Report	Pariani 17'

Estádio Durival de Britto, Curitiba
Attendance: 9,511
Referee: Mario Vianna (Brazil)

June 29, 1950
15:00

United States	1–0	England
Gaetjens 38'	Report

Estádio Independência, Belo Horizonte
Attendance: 10,151
Referee: Generoso Dattilo (Italy)

July 2, 1950
15:00

Chile	5–2	United States
Robledo 16'; Cremaschi 32', 60'; Prieto 54'; Riera 82'	Report	Wallace 47'; Maca 48' (pen.)

Estádio Ilha do Retiro, Recife
Attendance: 8,501
Referee: Mário Gardelli (Brazil)

=== Italy 1990 ===
==== Group stage ====
Pos	Team	Pld	W	D	L	GF	GA	GD	Pts	Qualification
1	Italy (H)	3	3	0	0	4	0	+4	6	Advance to knockout stage
2	Czechoslovakia	3	2	0	1	6	3	+3	4	Advance to knockout stage
3	Austria	3	1	0	2	2	3	−1	2	
4	United States	3	0	0	3	2	8	−6	0	

Source: FIFA
Rules for classification: Group stage tiebreakers
(H) Hosts

All times local (CEST/UTC+2)

June 10, 1990
17:00

United States	1–5	Czechoslovakia
Caligiuri 60'	Report	Skuhravý 26', 78'; Bílek 40' (pen.); Hašek 50'; Luhový 90+3'

Stadio Comunale, Florence
Attendance: 33,266
Referee: Kurt Röthlisberger (Switzerland)

June 14, 1990
21:00

Italy	1–0	United States
Giannini 11'	Report

Stadio Olimpico, Rome
Attendance: 73,423
Referee: Edgardo Codesal (Mexico)

June 19, 1990
21:00

Austria	2–1	United States
Ogris 49'; Rodax 63'	Report	Murray 83'

Stadio Comunale, Florence
Attendance: 34,857
Referee: Jamal Al Sharif (Syria)

=== United States 1994 ===
==== Group stage ====
Pos	Team	Pld	W	D	L	GF	GA	GD	Pts	Qualification
1	Romania	3	2	0	1	5	5	0	6	Advance to knockout stage
2	Switzerland	3	1	1	1	5	4	+1	4	Advance to knockout stage
3	United States (H)	3	1	1	1	3	3	0	4	Advance to knockout stage
4	Colombia	3	1	0	2	4	5	−1	3	

Source: FIFA
(H) Hosts

Ranking of third-placed teams

Pos	Grp	Team	Pld	W	D	L	GF	GA	GD	Pts	Qualification
1	D	Argentina	3	2	0	1	6	3	+3	6	Advance to knockout stage
2	F	Belgium	3	2	0	1	2	1	+1	6	Advance to knockout stage
3	A	United States	3	1	1	1	3	3	0	4	Advance to knockout stage
4	E	Italy	3	1	1	1	2	2	0	4	Advance to knockout stage
5	B	Russia	3	1	0	2	7	6	+1	3	
6	C	South Korea	3	0	2	1	4	5	−1	2	

Source: FIFA
June 18, 1994
11:30 a.m. EDT

United States	1–1	Switzerland
Wynalda 44'	Report	Bregy 39'

Pontiac Silverdome, Pontiac
Attendance: 73,425
Referee: Francisco Oscar Lamolina (Argentina)

June 22, 1994
19:30 PDT

United States	2–1	Colombia
Escobar 35' (o.g.); Stewart 52'	Report	Valencia 90'

Rose Bowl, Pasadena
Attendance: 93,869
Referee: Fabio Baldas (Italy)

June 26, 1994
16:00 PDT

United States	0–1	Romania
	Report	Petrescu 18'

Rose Bowl, Pasadena
Attendance: 93,869
Referee: Mario van der Ende (Netherlands)

==== Round of 16 ====
July 4, 1994
12:30 PDT

Brazil	1–0	United States
Bebeto 72'	Report

Stanford Stadium, Stanford
Attendance: 84,147
Referee: Joël Quiniou (France)

=== France 1998 ===
==== Group stage ====
Pos	Team	Pld	W	D	L	GF	GA	GD	Pts	Qualification
1	Germany	3	2	1	0	6	2	+4	7	Advance to knockout stage
2	FR Yugoslavia	3	2	1	0	4	2	+2	7	Advance to knockout stage
3	Iran	3	1	0	2	2	4	−2	3	
4	United States	3	0	0	3	1	5	−4	0	

Source: FIFA

All times local (CEST/UTC+2)

June 15, 1998
21:00

Germany	2–0	United States
Möller 9'; Klinsmann 65'	Report

Parc des Princes, Paris
Attendance: 45,500
Referee: Said Belqola (Morocco)

June 21, 1998
21:00

United States	1–2	Iran
McBride 87'	Report	Estili 40'; Mahdavikia 84'

Stade de Gerland, Lyon
Attendance: 39,100
Referee: Urs Meier (Switzerland)

June 25, 1998
21:00

United States	0–1	FR Yugoslavia
	Report	Komljenović 4'

Stade de la Beaujoire, Nantes
Attendance: 35,500
Referee: Gamal Al-Ghandour (Egypt)

=== South Korea/Japan 2002 ===
==== Group stage ====
Pos	Team	Pld	W	D	L	GF	GA	GD	Pts	Qualification
1	South Korea (H)	3	2	1	0	4	1	+3	7	Advance to knockout stage
2	United States	3	1	1	1	5	6	−1	4	Advance to knockout stage
3	Portugal	3	1	0	2	6	4	+2	3	
4	Poland	3	1	0	2	3	7	−4	3	

Source: FIFA
Rules for classification: Tie-breaking criteria
(H) Hosts

All times local (UTC+9)

June 5, 2002
18:00

United States	3–2	Portugal
O'Brien 4'; J. Costa 29' (o.g.); McBride 36'	Report	Beto 39'; Agoos 71' (o.g.)

Suwon World Cup Stadium, Suwon
Attendance: 37,306
Referee: Byron Moreno (Ecuador)

June 10, 2002
15:30

South Korea	1–1	United States
Ahn Jung-hwan 78'	Report	Mathis 24'

Daegu World Cup Stadium, Daegu
Attendance: 60,778
Referee: Urs Meier (Switzerland)

June 14, 2002
20:30

Poland	3–1	United States
Olisadebe 3'; Kryszałowicz 5'; Żewłakow 66'	Report	Donovan 83'

Daejeon World Cup Stadium, Daejeon
Attendance: 26,482
Referee: Lu Jun (China)

==== Round of 16 ====
June 17, 2002
15:30

Mexico	0–2	United States
	Report	McBride 8'; Donovan 65'

Jeonju World Cup Stadium, Jeonju
Attendance: 36,380
Referee: Vítor Melo Pereira (Portugal)

==== Quarterfinals ====
June 21, 2002
20:30

Germany	1–0	United States
Ballack 39'	Report

Munsu Cup Stadium, Ulsan
Attendance: 37,337
Referee: Hugh Dallas (Scotland)

=== Germany 2006 ===
==== Group stage ====
Pos	Team	Pld	W	D	L	GF	GA	GD	Pts	Qualification
1	Italy	3	2	1	0	5	1	+4	7	Advance to knockout stage
2	Ghana	3	2	0	1	4	3	+1	6	Advance to knockout stage
3	Czech Republic	3	1	0	2	3	4	−1	3	
4	United States	3	0	1	2	2	6	−4	1	

Source: FIFA
Rules for classification: Tie-breaking criteria

All times local (CEST/UTC+2)

June 12, 2006
18:00

United States	0–3	Czech Republic
	Report	Koller 5'; Rosický 36', 76'

FIFA WM Stadion Gelsenkirchen, Gelsenkirchen
Attendance: 52,000
Referee: Carlos Amarilla (Paraguay)

June 17, 2006
21:00

Italy	1–1	United States
Gilardino 22'	Report	Zaccardo 27' (o.g.)

Fritz-Walter-Stadion, Kaiserslautern
Attendance: 46,000
Referee: Jorge Larrionda (Uruguay)

June 22, 2006
16:00

Ghana	2–1	United States
Draman 22'; Appiah 45+2' (pen.)	Report	Dempsey 43'

FIFA WM Stadion Nürnberg, Nuremberg
Attendance: 41,000
Referee: Markus Merk (Germany)

=== South Africa 2010 ===
==== Group stage ====
Pos	Team	Pld	W	D	L	GF	GA	GD	Pts	Qualification
1	United States	3	1	2	0	4	3	+1	5	Advance to knockout stage
2	England	3	1	2	0	2	1	+1	5	Advance to knockout stage
3	Slovenia	3	1	1	1	3	3	0	4	
4	Algeria	3	0	1	2	0	2	−2	1	

Source: FIFA
Rules for classification: Tie-breaking criteria

All times local (UTC+02)

June 12, 2010
20:30

England	1–1	United States
Gerrard 4'	Report	Dempsey 40'

Royal Bafokeng Stadium, Rustenburg
Attendance: 38,646
Referee: Carlos Simon (Brazil)

June 18, 2010
16:00

Slovenia	2–2	United States
Birsa 13'; Ljubijankić 42'	Report	Donovan 48'; Bradley 82'

Ellis Park Stadium, Johannesburg
Attendance: 45,573
Referee: Koman Coulibaly (Mali)

June 23, 2010
16:00

United States	1–0	Algeria
Donovan 90+1'	Report

Loftus Versfeld Stadium, Pretoria
Attendance: 35,827
Referee: Frank De Bleeckere (Belgium)

==== Round of 16 ====
June 26, 2010
20:30

United States	1–2 (a.e.t.)	Ghana
Donovan 62' (pen.)	Report	Boateng 5'; Gyan 93'

Royal Bafokeng Stadium, Rustenburg
Attendance: 34,976
Referee: Viktor Kassai (Hungary)

=== Brazil 2014 ===
==== Group stage ====
Pos	Team	Pld	W	D	L	GF	GA	GD	Pts	Qualification
1	Germany	3	2	1	0	7	2	+5	7	Advance to knockout stage
2	United States	3	1	1	1	4	4	0	4	Advance to knockout stage
3	Portugal	3	1	1	1	4	7	−3	4	
4	Ghana	3	0	1	2	4	6	−2	1	

Source: FIFA
Rules for classification: Tie-breaking criteria
June 16, 2014
19:00 UTC−3

Ghana	1–2	United States
A. Ayew 82'	Report	Dempsey 1'; Brooks 86'

Arena das Dunas, Natal
Attendance: 39,760
Referee: Jonas Eriksson (Sweden)

June 22, 2014
18:00 UTC−4

United States	2–2	Portugal
Jones 64'; Dempsey 81'	Report	Nani 5'; Varela 90+5'

Arena da Amazônia, Manaus
Attendance: 40,123
Referee: Néstor Pitana (Argentina)

June 26, 2014
13:00 UTC−3

United States	0–1	Germany
	Report	Müller 55'

Arena Pernambuco, Recife
Attendance: 41,876
Referee: Ravshan Irmatov (Uzbekistan)

==== Round of 16 ====
July 1, 2014
17:00 UTC−3

Belgium	2–1 (a.e.t.)	United States
De Bruyne 93'; Lukaku 105'	Report	Green 107'

Arena Fonte Nova, Salvador
Attendance: 51,227
Referee: Djamel Haimoudi (Algeria)

=== Qatar 2022 ===
==== Group stage ====
Pos	Team	Pld	W	D	L	GF	GA	GD	Pts	Qualification
1	England	3	2	1	0	9	2	+7	7	Advance to knockout stage
2	United States	3	1	2	0	2	1	+1	5	Advance to knockout stage
3	Iran	3	1	0	2	4	7	−3	3	
4	Wales	3	0	1	2	1	6	−5	1	

Source: FIFA
Rules for classification: Group stage tiebreakers
21 November 2022
22:00

United States	1–1	Wales
Weah 36'		Bale 82' (pen.)

Ahmad bin Ali Stadium, Al Rayyan
Attendance: 43,418
Referee: Abdulrahman Al-Jassim (Qatar)

25 November 2022
22:00

England	0–0	United States

Al Bayt Stadium, Al Khor
Attendance: 68,463
Referee: Jesús Valenzuela (Venezuela)

29 November 2022
22:00

Iran	0–1	United States
		Pulisic 38'

Al Thumama Stadium, Doha
Attendance: 42,127
Referee: Antonio Mateu Lahoz (Spain)

==== Knockout stage ====
Round of 16

3 December 2022
18:00

Netherlands	3–1	United States
Depay 10'; Blind 45+1'; Dumfries 81'		Wright 76'

Khalifa International Stadium, Al Rayyan
Attendance: 44,846
Referee: Wilton Sampaio (Brazil)

=== United States/Canada/Mexico 2026 ===
==== Group stage ====
Pos	Team	Pld	W	D	L	GF	GA	GD	Pts	Qualification
1	United States (H)	3	2	0	1	8	4	+4	6	Advance to knockout stage
2	Australia	3	1	1	1	2	2	0	4 (Note: Tied on head-to-head result (Paraguay 0–0 Australia). Overall goal difference was used as the tiebreaker.)	Advance to knockout stage
3	Paraguay	3	1	1	1	2	4	−2	4	Advance to knockout stage
4	Turkey	3	1	0	2	3	5	−2	3	

Source: FIFA
(H) Hosts
Notes:
June 12, 2026
6:00 p.m. UTC−7

United States	4–1	Paraguay
Bobadilla 7' (o.g.); Balogun 31', 45+5'; Reyna 90+8'	(Note: "USA vs Paraguay | First Stage | FIFA World Cup 2026". FIFA. Retrieved June 12, 2026.; "Match Report – Group D – USA v. Paraguay". FIFA. June 12, 2026. Retrieved June 12, 2026.; "Post match summary report – Group D – USA v. Paraguay". FIFA. June 13, 2026. Retrieved June 13, 2026.)	Maurício 73'

SoFi Stadium, Inglewood
Attendance: 70,492
Referee: Danny Makkelie (Netherlands)

June 19, 2026
12:00 p.m. UTC−7

United States	2–0	Australia
Burgess 11' (o.g.); Freeman 43'	(Note: "USA vs Australia | First Stage | FIFA World Cup 2026". FIFA. Retrieved June 19, 2026.; "Match Report – Group D – USA v. Australia". FIFA. June 19, 2026. Retrieved June 19, 2026.; "Post match summary report – Group D – USA v. Australia". FIFA. June 19, 2026. Retrieved June 20, 2026.)

Lumen Field, Seattle
Attendance: 66,925
Referee: Felix Zwayer (Germany)

June 25, 2026
7:00 p.m. UTC−7

Turkey	3–2	United States
Güler 10'; Yılmaz 31'; Ayhan 90+8'	(Note: "Türkiye vs USA | First Stage | FIFA World Cup 2026". FIFA. Retrieved June 26, 2026.; "Match Report – Group D – Türkiye v. USA". FIFA. June 26, 2026. Retrieved June 26, 2026.; "Post match summary report – Group D – Türkiye v. USA". FIFA. June 26, 2026. Retrieved June 27, 2026.)	Trusty 3'; Berhalter 49'

SoFi Stadium, Inglewood
Attendance: 70,492
Referee: Mustapha Ghorbal (Algeria)

==== Knockout stage ====
Round of 32

July 1, 2026
5:00 p.m. UTC−7

United States	2–0	Bosnia and Herzegovina
Balogun 45'; Tillman 82'	(Note: "USA vs Bosnia and Herzegovina | Round of 32 | FIFA World Cup 2026". FIFA. Retrieved July 2, 2026.; "Match Report – Round of 32 – USA v. Bosnia and Herzegovina". FIFA. July 2, 2026. Retrieved July 2, 2026.; "Post match summary report – Round of 32 – USA v. Bosnia and Herzegovina". FIFA. July 1, 2026. Retrieved July 3, 2026.)

Levi's Stadium, Santa Clara
Attendance: 68,827
Referee: Raphael Claus (Brazil)

Round of 16

July 6, 2026
5:00 p.m. UTC−7

United States	1–4	Belgium
Tillman 31'	(Note: "USA vs Belgium | Round of 16 | FIFA World Cup 2026". FIFA. Retrieved July 7, 2026.; "Match Report – Round of 16 – USA v. Belgium". FIFA. July 7, 2026. Retrieved July 7, 2026.; "Post match summary report – Round of 16 – USA v. Belgium". FIFA. July 7, 2026. Retrieved July 7, 2026.)	De Ketelaere 9', 33'; Vanaken 57'; Lukaku 90+3'

Lumen Field, Seattle
Attendance: 66,925
Referee: Adham Makhadmeh (Jordan)

== Player records ==
=== Most appearances ===
Rank	Player	Matches	World Cups
1	Landon Donovan	12	2002, 2006 and 2010
2	Cobi Jones	11	1994, 1998 and 2002
2	Earnie Stewart	11	1994, 1998 and 2002
2	DaMarcus Beasley	11	2002, 2006, 2010 and 2014
5	Brian McBride	10	1998, 2002 and 2006
5	Claudio Reyna	10	1998, 2002 and 2006
5	Clint Dempsey	10	2006, 2010 and 2014
8	Tab Ramos	9	1990, 1994 and 1998
8	Eddie Pope	9	1998, 2002 and 2006
8	Sergiño Dest	9	2022 and 2026
8	Weston McKennie	9	2022 and 2026

==== Tim Howard world record ====
On July 1, 2014, Tim Howard was named man of the match, despite the United States losing 2–1 to Belgium after extra time in the round of 16. During the match, he broke the record for most saves in a World Cup match with 16. (Note: FIFA's initial match statistics showed 16 saves, and many news sources continue to use this number. The official FIFA statistics were updated on July 5, 2014, to show 15 saves.) After breaking this record, his performance was celebrated worldwide on the internet, with the hashtag #ThingsTimHowardCouldSave trending on Twitter, and the Wikipedia article for the United States Secretary of Defense was briefly vandalized to indicate that he was the incumbent.

=== Goalscorers ===
On July 13th 1930, Bart McGhee made history by scoring USA's first-ever FIFA World Cup goal on their match against Belgium in Montevideo.

Player	Goals	1930	1934	1950	1990	1994	1998	2002	2006	2010	2014	2022	2026
Landon Donovan	5							2		3			
Bert Patenaude	4	4											
Clint Dempsey	4								1	1	2		
Brian McBride	3						1	2					
Folarin Balogun	3												3
Malik Tillman	2												2
Bart McGhee	1	1											
Tom Florie	1	1											
Jim Brown	1	1											
Aldo Donelli	1		1										
Joe Gaetjens	1			1									
Joe Maca	1			1									
Gino Pariani	1			1									
Frank Wallace	1			1									
Bruce Murray	1				1								
Paul Caligiuri	1				1								
Eric Wynalda	1					1							
Earnie Stewart	1					1							
Clint Mathis	1							1					
John O'Brien	1							1					
Michael Bradley	1									1			
John Brooks	1										1		
Julian Green	1										1		
Jermaine Jones	1										1		
Christian Pulisic	1											1	
Timothy Weah	1											1	
Haji Wright	1											1	
Giovanni Reyna	1												1
Alex Freeman	1												1
Auston Trusty	1												1
Sebastian Berhalter	1												1
Own goals	5					1		1	1				2
Total	51	7	1	4	2	3	1	7	2	5	5	3	11

Own goals scored for opponents

- Jeff Agoos (scored for Portugal in 2002)

== Media coverage ==
=== ABC ===
FIFA World Cup on ABC is the branding used for presentations of the FIFA World Cup produced by the American Broadcasting Company television network in the United States. ABC first broadcast World Cup matches in 1970, when they aired week-old filmed highlights shown on ABC's Wide World of Sports. ABC next broadcast the 1982 FIFA World Cup Final. Beginning in 1994, ABC was the official American network broadcaster of the World Cup up through 2014. ABC also broadcast the FIFA Women's World Cup in 1999 and 2003; Fox took over the American World Cup TV broadcasts in 2011, which took effect in 2015.

==== 1970 ====
The first American telecast of a World Cup match was when NBC aired the final between England and West Germany from four years prior. NBC there, aired the contest on a same-day tape delay using the BBC’s black-and-white feed.

In 1970, it was ABC's turn to broadcast the World Cup final. While ABC aired the contest between Italy and Brazil in color unlike what NBC did in 1966, ABC decided to wait until Christmas, six months after Brazil won, to show it as part of an episode of Wide World of Sports.

==== 1982 ====
In 1982, PBS and ESPN provided the first thorough American television coverage of the FIFA World Cup. ABC aired the first live telecast of the final. ABC aired commercials during the live action. Meanwhile, PBS aired same day highlights of the top game of the day.

Commentators

- Giorgio Chinaglia (studio analyst)
- Paul Gardner (color commentary)
- Mario Machado (color commentary)
- Jim McKay (play-by-play)
- Jack Whitaker (studio host)

==== 1994 ====
The 1994 FIFA World Cup marked the return of the World Cup on ESPN and ABC and the first time they used their own commentary teams for all matches. Roger Twibell and Seamus Malin were the lead broadcast team. Al Trautwig and Rick Davis were the secondary broadcast team. Other play-by-play announcers were: Bob Carpenter Bob Ley, Ian Darke, Randy Hahn, and Jim Donovan. Other color commentators were: Clive Charles, Ty Keough, Peter Vermes, Ron Newman, and Bill McDermott. Jim McKay was the studio host alongside studio analyst Desmond Armstrong only for games on ABC.

The 1994 American coverage had many firsts: The first with all of the matches televised, the first with no commercial interruptions during live action, and the first to feature an on-screen score & time box.

==== 1998 ====
In 1998, all 64 matches were televised in the United States live for the first time. Bob Ley and Seamus Malin was the lead broadcast team with other broadcast teams include: Roger Twibell and Mike Hill, JP Dellacamera and Bill McDermott, Derek Rae and Ty Keough, and Phil Schoen and Tommy Smyth. Brent Musburger and Eric Wynalda worked in the studio.

==== 2002 ====
Unlike in 1998, when ESPN and ABC paid $20 million for the broadcast rights to the World Cup, the English-language rights for the 2002 and 2006 editions were sold instead to Major League Soccer for $40–50 million. Through an agreement with the Walt Disney Company, ESPN and ABC would air both tournaments at no cost, while MLS would cover production costs and sell advertisements via its newly-created marketing arm, Soccer United Marketing.

In 2002, 59 matches were broadcast live, along with 5 rebroadcasts on ABC, with coverage from Japan and South Korea carried live in the American late night graveyard slot.

Hockey play-by-play announcer Jack Edwards and Ty Keough were the lead broadcast team and called the games live in South Korea and Japan. Other broadcast teams were: JP Dellacamera and Tommy Smyth, Glenn Davis and Shep Messing, and Mike Hill and Shep Messing, and Seamus Malin, however, they were based at the ESPN headquarters in Bristol, Connecticut. Terry Gannon hosted in the studio alongside studio analysts Eric Wynalda and Giorgio Chinaglia.

==== 2006 ====
The 2006 coverage from Germany was fully live as well. Dave O'Brien joined Marcelo Balboa on the lead broadcast team for the 2006 FIFA World Cup coverage on ESPN and ABC Sports, despite having no experience calling soccer matches prior to that year. Because The Walt Disney Company, owner of both television outlets, retained control over on-air talent, the appointment of O'Brien as the main play-by-play voice was made over the objections of Soccer United Marketing, who wanted JP Dellacamera to continue in that role. Disney stated that their broadcast strategy was intended, in voice and style, to target the vast majority of Americans who do not follow the sport on a regular basis. Mispronunciation and incorrect addressing of names, misuse of soccer terminology, and lack of insight into tactics and history plagued the telecasts, resulting in heavy criticism from English-speaking soccer fans, many of whom ended up watching the games on Univision instead.

Other broadcast teams included: JP Dellacamera and John Harkes, Glenn Davis and Shep Messing, Adrian Healey and Tommy Smyth, and Rob Stone and Robin Fraser. Brent Musburger returned for his 2nd World Cup as lead studio host with other hosts Rece Davis, and Dave Revsine. Alexi Lalas, Eric Wynalda, Julie Foudy, and Heather Mitts were the studio analysts.

==== 2010 ====
The 2010 coverage from South Africa introduced ESPN 3D for 25 matches. ESPN's coverage of the 2010 World Cup has been widely recognized as a breakthrough in U.S. soccer broadcasting. Esteemed commentator Martin Tyler and Efan Ekoku led a team of all-British commentators in South Africa. Chris Fowler and Mike Tirico were the lead hosts in a studio set right outside of Soccer City in South Africa. Other broadcast teams were: Ian Darke and John Harkes, who called USMNT games, Derek Rae and Robbie Mustoe, Adrian Healey and Ally McCoist, and Jim Proudfoot and Roberto Martínez. Studio analysts were: Steve McManaman, Jurgen Klinsmann, Martínez, Ruud Gullit, Alexi Lalas, Shaun Bartlett, and Tommy Smyth. Bob Ley was another studio host, working his 4th World Cup. Reporters were: Jeremy Schaap (United States and Final), Julie Foudy, Allen Hopkins, Rob Stone, Selema Masekela, Andrew Orsatti (Australia), John Sutcliffe (Mexico), and Dan Williams

==== 2014 ====
The 2014 World Cup marked the end of the FIFA World Cup on ABC and ESPN. Ian Darke, Steve McManaman, and Taylor Twellman was the lead broadcast team, Jon Champion and Stewart Robson were the #2 team. Other play-by-play announcers were: Derek Rae, Adrian Healey, Daniel Mann, and Fernando Palomo. Color commentators: Craig Burley, Efan Ekoku, Roberto Martínez, Kasey Keller, and Alejandro Moreno. All commentators were in Brazil with the top 5 teams at the stadiums while the remaining team called matches off monitors in Rio. Mike Tirico was the lead studio host alongside other hosts Bob Ley and Lynsey Hipgrave with analysts: Alexi Lalas, McManaman, Michael Ballack, Moreno, Keller, Gilberto Silva, Santiago Solari, Martínez, Twellman, and Ruud van Nistelrooy. Reporters included: Jeremy Schaap (Lead), Julie Foudy, Bob Woodruff, John Sutcliffe, Rubens Pozzi.

The 2014 coverage was available on mobile devices and tablets via the WatchESPN application, as well as on Xbox 360 and Xbox One video game consoles, live and on-demand, via the ESPN on Xbox Live application.

=== NBC ===
FIFA World Cup on NBC is the branding used for presentations of the FIFA World Cup produced by the NBC television network in the United States. NBC was the official American network television broadcaster for the international soccer competition in 1966 and 1986.

==== 1966 ====
The first American coverage of the World Cup consisted only of a previously filmed telecast of the 1966 Final on NBC. The Final was aired before their coverage of the Saturday Major League Baseball Game of the Week. NBC used the black & white BBC feed and aired it on a two-hour film delay. This was the first time soccer had been shown in the United States as a stand-alone broadcast. Previously, ABC's Wide World of Sports had shown England's Football Association Cup on as long as a two-week delay.

==== 1986 ====
On October 6, 1984. NBC's anthology series, SportsWorld provided World Cup soccer qualifying coverage featuring the United States and the Netherlands Antilles.

1986 marked the first time that the World Cup had extensive live cable and network television coverage in the United States. ESPN carried most of the weekday matches while NBC did weekend games. NBC aired seven matches, including the "Hand of God" quarterfinal, with broadcasters on-site. NBC's theme music for their 1986 coverage was Herb Alpert's "1980", from his 1979 album Rise. It was originally a cue meant for the ill-fated 1980 Moscow Summer Olympics broadcasts. Meanwhile, ESPN aired about 25 matches that year, all with broadcasters in studio.

NBC's producers were forced to run the games' audio feed through telephone lines rather than through satellites. This was because the International Broadcast Center in Mexico City crossed up many communication lines. Consequently, various countries received commentary from others (or no sound or video at all). NBC in this case, received commentary from somewhere in Southeast Asia and so were forced to have Charlie Jones call collect and broadcast the Italy-Bulgaria opener via a handset telephone receiver. NBC lost the sound but still had video so Charlie Jones dialed collect again.

==== Commentators ====
- Don Criqui (studio host)
- Rick Davis (color commentary)
- Charlie Jones (play-by-play)
- Seamus Malin (studio analyst)
- Paul Gardner (color commentary)

=== Telemundo Deportes' ===
On October 22, 2011, Deportes Telemundo acquired the Spanish language rights to broadcast the FIFA Men's and Women's World Cup for around $600 million, replacing Univision as the tournament's Spanish language broadcaster, which began carrying the World Cup tournaments in 1970 (Fox acquired the English language U.S. broadcast rights through a separate agreement). The deal, which began with the 2015 Women's World Cup and runs through 2026, includes rights to associated FIFA-sanctioned tournaments (including the Men's Under 20 and Under 17 World Cups, and the Men's Beach Soccer World Cup), which will be telecast on Telemundo and NBC Universo; the deal was extended on February 12, 2015, to include rights to the 2026 FIFA World Cup.

On May 16, 2015, during Telemundo's 2015–16 upfront presentation in New York City, it was announced that Deportes Telemundo would be replaced by a new division initially known as NBC Deportes; the new division was formed as a branch of the English-language NBC Sports division, and be responsible for sports content for Telemundo, NBC Universo and related digital platforms. While it retained all existing sports telecast rights and programs aired by both Telemundo and NBC Universo, the latter network also began to expand its sports coverage, primarily in preparation for the 2016 Summer Olympics and the start of the division's contract with FIFA—whose first events included the 2015 U-20 World Cup and Women's World Cup.

=== Fox Sports ===
The English television rights to the FIFA World Cup have been held by Fox Sports since the 2018 edition and are set to run through 2026. The rights were originally set to expire in 2022, but that tournament's move to a November–December schedule prompted FIFA to award the 2026 rights to appease Fox, who had prior commitments to air other sporting events during the period. The 2022 World Cup broadcast was criticized for ignoring Qatar's human rights issues. Telemundo holds the Spanish television rights to broadcast the FIFA World Cup in the United States; their contract was also renewed through 2026.

== Head-to-head record ==
Opponent	Pld	W	D	L	GF	GA	GD	Win %
Algeria	1	1	0	0	1	0	+1	100.00
Argentina	1	0	0	1	1	6	−5	0.00
Australia	1	1	0	0	2	0	+2	100.00
Austria	1	0	0	1	1	2	−1	0.00
Belgium	3	1	0	2	5	6	−1	33.33
Bosnia and Herzegovina	1	1	0	0	2	0	+2	100.00
Brazil	1	0	0	1	0	1	−1	0.00
Chile	1	0	0	1	2	5	−3	0.00
Colombia	1	1	0	0	2	1	+1	100.00
Czechoslovakia	1	0	0	1	1	5	−4	0.00
Czech Republic	1	0	0	1	0	3	−3	0.00
England	3	1	2	0	2	1	+1	33.33
FR Yugoslavia	1	0	0	1	0	1	−1	0.00
Germany	3	0	0	3	0	4	−4	0.00
Ghana	3	1	0	2	4	5	−1	33.33
Iran	2	1	0	1	2	2	+0	50.00
Italy	3	0	1	2	2	9	−7	0.00
Mexico	1	1	0	0	2	0	+2	100.00
Netherlands	1	0	0	1	1	3	−2	0.00
Paraguay	2	2	0	0	7	1	+6	100.00
Poland	1	0	0	1	1	3	−2	0.00
Portugal	2	1	1	0	5	4	+1	50.00
Romania	1	0	0	1	0	1	−1	0.00
Slovenia	1	0	1	0	2	2	+0	0.00
South Korea	1	0	1	0	1	1	+0	0.00
Spain	1	0	0	1	1	3	−2	0.00
Switzerland	1	0	1	0	1	1	+0	0.00
Turkey	1	0	0	1	2	3	−1	0.00
Wales	1	0	1	0	1	1	+0	0.00
Total	42	12	8	22	51	74	−23	28.57

== See also ==
- North, Central American and Caribbean nations at the FIFA World Cup
- United States at the CONCACAF Gold Cup
- United States at the Copa América
- United States at the FIFA Confederations Cup
