= Chile at the FIFA World Cup =

International football delegation

This is a record of the results of the Chile national team at the FIFA World Cup. The FIFA World Cup is an international association football competition contested by the men's national teams of the members of Fédération Internationale de Football Association (FIFA), the sport's global governing body. The championship has been awarded every four years since the first tournament in 1930, except in 1942 and 1946, due to World War II.

The tournament consists of two parts, the qualification phase and the final phase (officially called the World Cup Finals). The qualification phase, which currently take place over the three years preceding the Finals, is used to determine which teams qualify for the Finals. The current format of the Finals involves 48 teams competing for the title, at venues within the host nation (or nations) over a period of about a month. The World Cup final is the most widely viewed sporting event in the world, with an estimated 715.1 million people watching the 2006 tournament final.

The Football Federation of Chile is the second oldest South American federation, with 127 years of existence. Its foundation dates back to 19 June 1895, at the port city of Valparaíso. Its first President was David Scott. Chile is one of four founding member nations of CONMEBOL together with Argentina, Brazil, and Uruguay. They established the South American footballing organization on 9 July 1916. The four original associations enacted and participated in the first ever South American Championship which would later be named the Copa América.

Chile have appeared in nine FIFA World Cup finals to date, which were in 1930, 1950, 1962 (which they hosted), 1966, 1974, 1982, 1998, 2010 and 2014. Their best performance was in 1962, where they finished in third place.

== Record at the FIFA World Cup ==
=== Overall record ===
FIFA World Cup record
Year	Round	Position	Pld	W	D*	L	GF	GA
(Uruguay) 1930	Group stage	5th	3	2	0	1	5	3
(Italy) 1934	Withdrew							
(France) 1938	Withdrew							
(Brazil) 1950	Group stage	9th	3	1	0	2	5	6
(Switzerland) 1954	Did not qualify							
(Sweden) 1958	Did not qualify							
(Chile) 1962	Third place	3rd	6	4	0	2	10	8
(England) 1966	Group stage	13th	3	0	1	2	2	5
(Mexico) 1970	Did not qualify							
(West Germany) 1974	Group stage	11th	3	0	2	1	1	2
(Argentina) 1978	Did not qualify							
(Spain) 1982	Group stage	22nd	3	0	0	3	3	8
(Mexico) 1986	Did not qualify							
(Italy) 1990	Did not qualify							
(United States) 1994	Banned from entering							
(France) 1998	Round of 16	16th	4	0	3	1	5	8
(South Korea) (Japan) 2002	Did not qualify							
(Germany) 2006	Did not qualify							
(South Africa) 2010	Round of 16	10th	4	2	0	2	3	5
(Brazil) 2014	Round of 16	9th	4	2	1	1	6	4
(Russia) 2018	Did not qualify							
(Qatar) 2022	Did not qualify							
(Canada) (Mexico) (United States) 2026	Did not qualify							
(Morocco) (Portugal) (Spain) 2030	To be determined							
(Saudi Arabia) 2034	To be determined							
Total	Third place	9/23	33	11	7	15	40	49

*Denotes draws including knockout matches decided via penalty shoot-out.
**Red border colour indicates tournament was held on home soil.

== List of matches ==
World Cup	Round	Opponent	Score	Result	Venue	Chile scorers
1930	Group 1	Mexico	3–0	W	Montevideo	Vidal 3', 65', Rosas 52' (o.g.)
1930	Group 1	France	1–0	W	Montevideo	Subiabre 67'
1930	Group 1	Argentina	1–3	L	Montevideo	Subiabre 15'
1950	Group 2	England	0–2	L	Rio de Janeiro	—
1950	Group 2	Spain	0–2	L	Rio de Janeiro	—
1950	Group 2	United States	5–2	W	Recife	Robledo 16', Riera 32', Cremaschi 54', 82', Prieto 60'
1962	Group 2	Switzerland	3–1	W	Santiago de Chile	L. Sánchez 44', 55', Ramírez 51'
1962	Group 2	Italy	2–0	W	Santiago de Chile	Ramírez 73', Toro 87'
1962	Group 2	West Germany	0–2	L	Santiago de Chile	—
1962	Quarter-finals	Soviet Union	2–1	W	Arica	L. Sánchez 11', Rojas 29'
1962	Semi-finals	Brazil	2–4	L	Santiago de Chile	Toro 42', L. Sánchez 61' (pen.)
1962	Match for third place	Yugoslavia	1–0	W	Santiago de Chile	Rojas 90'
1966	Group 4	Italy	0–2	L	Sunderland	—
1966	Group 4	North Korea	1–1	D	Middlesbrough	Marcos 26' (pen.)
1966	Group 4	Soviet Union	1–2	L	Sunderland	Marcos 32'
1974	Group 1	West Germany	0–1	L	Berlin	—
1974	Group 1	East Germany	1–1	D	Berlin	Ahumada 69'
1974	Group 1	Australia	0–0	D	Berlin	—
1982	Group 2	Austria	0–1	L	Oviedo	—
1982	Group 2	West Germany	1–4	L	Gijón	Moscoso 90'
1982	Group 2	Algeria	2–3	L	Oviedo	Neira 59' (pen.), Letelier 73'
1998	Group B	Italy	2–2	D	Bordeaux	Salas 45', 49'
1998	Group B	Austria	1–1	D	Saint-Étienne	Salas 70'
1998	Group B	Cameroon	1–1	D	Nantes	Sierra 20'
1998	Round of 16	Brazil	1–4	L	París	Salas 68'
2010	Group H	Honduras	1–0	W	Nelspruit	Beausejour 34'
2010	Group H	Switzerland	1–0	W	Port Elizabeth	Gonzalez 75'
2010	Group H	Spain	1–2	L	Pretoria	Millar 47'
2010	Round of 16	Brazil	0–3	L	Johannesburg	—
2014	Group B	Australia	3–1	W	Cuiabá	A. Sánchez 12', Valdivia 14', Beausejour 92+'
2014	Group B	Spain	2–0	W	Rio de Janeiro	Vargas 20', Aránguiz 43'
2014	Group B	Netherlands	0–2	L	São Paulo	—
2014	Round of 16	Brazil	1–1 (a.e.t.) (2–3 p)	D	Belo Horizonte	A. Sánchez 32'

=== 1930 FIFA World Cup ===
==== Group Stage ====
Pos	Team	Pld	W	D	L	GF	GA	GD	Pts	Qualification
1	Argentina	3	3	0	0	10	4	+6	6	Advance to the knockout stage
2	Chile	3	2	0	1	5	3	+2	4	
3	France	3	1	0	2	4	3	+1	2	
4	Mexico	3	0	0	3	4	13	−9	0	

Source: ESPN
16 July 1930
14:45 UYT (UTC−03:30)

Chile	3–0	Mexico
Vidal 3', 65' (Note: This is one of several goals for which the statistical details are disputed. The goalscorers and timings used here are those of FIFA, the official record. Some other sources, such as RSSSF, state a different scorer, timing, or both.); M. Rosas 52' (o.g.)

Estadio Parque Central, Montevideo
Attendance: 9,249
Referee: Henri Christophe (Belgium)

19 July 1930
12:50 UYT (UTC−03:30)

Chile	1–0	France
Subiabre 67'

Estadio Centenario, Montevideo
Attendance: 2,000
Referee: Anibal Tejada (Uruguay)

22 July 1930
14:45 UYT (UTC−03:30)

Argentina	3–1	Chile
Stábile 12', 13'; M. Evaristo 51'		Subiabre 15'

Estadio Centenario, Montevideo
Attendance: 41,459
Referee: John Langenus (Belgium)

=== 1950 FIFA World Cup ===
==== Group Stage ====
Pos	Team	Pld	W	D	L	GF	GA	GD	Pts	Qualification
1	Spain	3	3	0	0	6	1	+5	6	Advance to final round
2	England	3	1	0	2	2	2	0	2	
2	Chile	3	1	0	2	5	6	−1	2	
2	United States	3	1	0	2	4	8	−4	2	

Source: FIFA
25 June 1950
15:00 BRT (UTC-3)

England	2–0	Chile
Mortensen 39'; Mannion 51'

Estádio do Maracanã, Rio de Janeiro
Attendance: 29,703
Referee: Karel van der Meer (Netherlands)

29 June 1950
15:00 BRT (UTC-3)

Spain	2–0	Chile
Basora 17'; Zarra 30'

Estádio do Maracanã, Rio de Janeiro
Attendance: 19,790
Referee: Alberto Malcher (Brazil)

2 July 1950
15:00 BRT (UTC-3)

Chile	5–2	United States
Robledo 16'; Cremaschi 32', 60'; Prieto 54'; Riera 82'		Wallace 47'; Maca 48' (pen.)

Estádio Ilha do Retiro, Recife
Attendance: 8,501
Referee: Mário Gardelli (Brazil)

=== 1962 FIFA World Cup ===
==== Group Stage ====
Pos	Team	Pld	W	D	L	GF	GA	GR	Pts	Qualification
1	West Germany	3	2	1	0	4	1	4.000	5	Advance to knockout stage
2	Chile	3	2	0	1	5	3	1.667	4	Advance to knockout stage
3	Italy	3	1	1	1	3	2	1.500	3	
4	Switzerland	3	0	0	3	2	8	0.250	0	

Source: FIFA
30 May 1962
15:00 CLT (UTC-04)

Chile	3–1	Switzerland
L. Sánchez 44', 55'; Ramírez 51'		Wüthrich 6'

Estadio Nacional, Santiago
Attendance: 65,006
Referee: Kenneth Aston (England)

2 June 1962
15:00 CLT (UTC-04)

Chile	2–0	Italy
Ramírez 73'; Toro 87'

Estadio Nacional, Santiago
Attendance: 66,057
Referee: Kenneth Aston (England)

6 June 1962
15:00 CLT (UTC-04)

West Germany	2–0	Chile
Szymaniak 21' (pen.); Seeler 82'

Estadio Nacional, Santiago
Attendance: 67,224
Referee: Robert Holley Davidson (Scotland)

==== Knockout Stage ====
Quarter-finaals

10 June 1962
14:30 CLT (UTC-04)

Chile	2–1	Soviet Union
L. Sánchez 11'; Rojas 29'		Chislenko 26'

Estadio Carlos Dittborn, Arica
Attendance: 17,268
Referee: Leo Horn (Netherlands)

Semi-finals

13 June 1962
14:30 CLT (UTC-04)

Brazil	4–2	Chile
Garrincha 9', 32'; Vavá 47', 78'		Toro 42'; L. Sánchez 61' (pen.)

Estadio Nacional, Santiago
Attendance: 76,594
Referee: Arturo Yamasaki Maldonado (Peru)

=== 1966 FIFA World Cup ===
==== Group Stage ====
Pos	Team	Pld	W	D	L	GF	GA	GR	Pts	Qualification
1	Soviet Union	3	3	0	0	6	1	6.000	6	Advance to knockout stage
2	North Korea	3	1	1	1	2	4	0.500	3	Advance to knockout stage
3	Italy	3	1	0	2	2	2	1.000	2	
4	Chile	3	0	1	2	2	5	0.400	1	

Source: FIFA
13 July 1966
19:30 BST

Italy	2–0	Chile
Mazzola 8'; Barison 88'

Roker Park, Sunderland
Attendance: 27,199
Referee: Gottfried Dienst (Switzerland)

15 July 1966
19:30 BST

Chile	1–1	North Korea
Marcos 26' (pen.)		Pak Seung-zin 88'

Ayresome Park, Middlesbrough
Attendance: 13,792
Referee: Ali Kandil (United Arab Republic)

20 July 1966
19:30 BST

Soviet Union	2–1	Chile
Porkuyan 28', 85'		Marcos 32'

Roker Park, Sunderland
Attendance: 16,027
Referee: John Adair (Northern Ireland)

=== 1974 FIFA World Cup ===
==== Group Stage ====
Pos	Team	Pld	W	D	L	GF	GA	GD	Pts	Qualification
1	East Germany	3	2	1	0	4	1	+3	5	Advance to second round
2	West Germany	3	2	0	1	4	1	+3	4	Advance to second round
3	Chile	3	0	2	1	1	2	−1	2	
4	Australia	3	0	1	2	0	5	−5	1	

Source: FIFA
14 June 1974
16:00

West Germany	1–0	Chile
Breitner 18'

Olympiastadion, West Berlin
Attendance: 81,100
Referee: Doğan Babacan (Turkey)

18 June 1974
19:30

Chile	1–1	East Germany
Ahumada 69'		Hoffmann 55'

Olympiastadion, West Berlin
Attendance: 28,300
Referee: Aurelio Angonese (Italy)

22 June 1974
16:00

Australia	0–0	Chile

Olympiastadion, West Berlin
Attendance: 17,400
Referee: Jafar Namdar (Iran)

=== 1982 FIFA World Cup ===
==== First group stage ====
Pos	Team	Pld	W	D	L	GF	GA	GD	Pts	Qualification
1	West Germany	3	2	0	1	6	3	+3	4	Advance to second round
2	Austria	3	2	0	1	3	1	+2	4	Advance to second round
3	Algeria	3	2	0	1	5	5	0	4	
4	Chile	3	0	0	3	3	8	−5	0	

Source: FIFA
17 June 1982
17:15 CEST

Chile	0–1	Austria
		Schachner 22'

Estadio Carlos Tartiere, Oviedo
Attendance: 22,500
Referee: Juan Daniel Cardellino (Uruguay)

20 June 1982
17:15 CEST

West Germany	4–1	Chile
Rummenigge 9', 57', 66'; Reinders 83'		Moscoso 90'

El Molinón, Gijón
Attendance: 42,000
Referee: Bruno Galler (Switzerland)

24 June 1982
17:15 CEST

Algeria	3–2	Chile
Assad 7', 31'; Bensaoula 35'		Neira 59' (pen.); Letelier 73'

Estadio Carlos Tartiere, Oviedo
Attendance: 16,000
Referee: Rómulo Méndez (Guatemala)

=== 1998 FIFA World Cup ===
==== Group Stage ====
Pos	Team	Pld	W	D	L	GF	GA	GD	Pts	Qualification
1	Italy	3	2	1	0	7	3	+4	7	Advance to knockout stage
2	Chile	3	0	3	0	4	4	0	3	Advance to knockout stage
3	Austria	3	0	2	1	3	4	−1	2	
4	Cameroon	3	0	2	1	2	5	−3	2	

Source: FIFA
11 June 1998
17:30 CEST (UTC+2)

Italy	2–2	Chile
Vieri 10'; R. Baggio 84' (pen.)		Salas 45+3', 50'

Parc Lescure, Bordeaux
Attendance: 31,800
Referee: Lucien Bouchardeau (Niger)

17 June 1998
17:30 CEST (UTC+2)

Chile	1–1	Austria
Salas 70'		Vastić 90+2'

Stade Geoffroy-Guichard, Saint-Étienne
Attendance: 30,600
Referee: Gamal Al-Ghandour (Egypt)

23 June 1998
16:00 CEST (UTC+2)

Chile	1–1	Cameroon
Sierra 20'		Mboma 56'

Stade de la Beaujoire, Nantes
Attendance: 35,500
Referee: László Vágner (Hungary)

==== Knockout stage ====
Round of 16

27 June 1998
21:00 CEST (UTC+2)

Brazil	4–1	Chile
César Sampaio 11', 26'; Ronaldo 45+3' (pen.), 72'		Salas 70'

Parc des Princes, Paris
Attendance: 45,500
Referee: Marc Batta (France)

=== 2010 FIFA World Cup ===
==== Group Stage ====
Pos	Team	Pld	W	D	L	GF	GA	GD	Pts	Qualification
1	Spain	3	2	0	1	4	2	+2	6	Advance to knockout stage
2	Chile	3	2	0	1	3	2	+1	6	Advance to knockout stage
3	Switzerland	3	1	1	1	1	1	0	4	
4	Honduras	3	0	1	2	0	3	−3	1	

Source: FIFA
16 June 2010
13:30

Honduras	0–1	Chile
		Beausejour 34'

Mbombela Stadium, Nelspruit
Attendance: 32,664
Referee: Eddy Maillet (Seychelles)

21 June 2010
16:00

Chile	1–0	Switzerland
González 75'

Nelson Mandela Bay Stadium, Port Elizabeth
Attendance: 34,872
Referee: Khalil Al Ghamdi (Saudi Arabia)

25 June 2010
20:30

Chile	1–2	Spain
Millar 47'		Villa 24'; Iniesta 37'

Loftus Versfeld Stadium, Pretoria
Attendance: 41,958
Referee: Marco Rodríguez (Mexico)

==== Knockout stage ====
Round of 16

28 June 2010
20:30

Brazil	3–0	Chile
Juan 35'; Luís Fabiano 38'; Robinho 59'

Ellis Park Stadium, Johannesburg
Attendance: 54,096
Referee: Howard Webb (England)

=== 2014 FIFA World Cup ===
==== Group Stage ====
Pos	Team	Pld	W	D	L	GF	GA	GD	Pts	Qualification
1	Netherlands	3	3	0	0	10	3	+7	9	Advance to knockout stage
2	Chile	3	2	0	1	5	3	+2	6	Advance to knockout stage
3	Spain	3	1	0	2	4	7	−3	3	
4	Australia	3	0	0	3	3	9	−6	0	

Source: FIFA
13 June 2014
18:00 AMT (UTC−4)

Chile	3–1	Australia
Sánchez 12'; Valdivia 14'; Beausejour 90+2'		Cahill 35'

Arena Pantanal, Cuiabá
Attendance: 40,275
Referee: Noumandiez Doué (Ivory Coast)

18 June 2014
16:00 BRT (UTC−3)

Spain	0–2	Chile
		Vargas 20'; Aránguiz 43'

Estádio do Maracanã, Rio de Janeiro
Attendance: 74,101
Referee: Mark Geiger (United States)

23 June 2014
13:00 BRT (UTC−3)

Netherlands	2–0	Chile
Fer 77'; Depay 90+2'

Arena de São Paulo, São Paulo
Attendance: 62,996
Referee: Bakary Gassama (Gambia)

==== Knockout stage ====
Round of 16

28 June 2014
13:00 BRT (UTC−3)

Brazil	1–1 (a.e.t.)	Chile
David Luiz 18'		Sánchez 32'
Penalties
David Luiz (penalty scored); Willian (penalty missed); Marcelo (penalty scored); Hulk (penalty missed); Neymar (penalty scored)	3–2	(penalty missed) Pinilla; (penalty missed) Sánchez; (penalty scored) Aránguiz; (penalty scored) Díaz; (penalty missed) Jara

Estádio Mineirão, Belo Horizonte
Attendance: 57,714
Referee: Howard Webb (England)

=== Record by opponent ===
FIFA World Cup matches (by team)
Opponent	Wins	Draws	Losses	Total	Goals Scored	Goals Conceded
Algeria	0	0	1	1	2	3
Argentina	0	0	1	1	1	3
Australia	1	1	0	2	3	1
Austria	0	1	1	2	1	2
Brazil	0	1	3	4	4	12
Cameroon	0	1	0	1	1	1
East Germany	0	1	0	1	1	1
England	0	0	1	1	0	2
France	1	0	0	1	1	0
Germany	0	0	3	3	1	7
Honduras	1	0	0	1	1	0
Italy	1	1	1	3	4	4
Mexico	1	0	0	1	3	0
Netherlands	0	0	1	1	0	2
North Korea	0	1	0	1	1	1
Soviet Union	1	0	1	2	3	3
Spain	1	0	2	3	3	4
Switzerland	2	0	0	2	4	1
United States	1	0	0	1	5	2
Yugoslavia	1	0	0	1	1	0

== Player records ==
=== Most appearances ===
Rank	Player	Appearances	World Cups
1	Elías Figueroa	9	1966, 1974 and 1982
1	Leonel Sánchez	9	1962 and 1966
3	Claudio Bravo	8	2010 and 2014
3	Mauricio Isla	8	2010 and 2014
3	Gonzalo Jara	8	2010 and 2014
3	Alexis Sánchez	8	2010 and 2014
7	Luis Eyzaguirre	7	1962 and 1966
7	Honorino Landa	7	1962 and 1966
7	Gary Medel	7	2010 and 2014
7	Jorge Valdivia	7	2010 and 2014
7	Arturo Vidal	7	2010 and 2014

== Goalscorers ==
On July 16, 1930, Carlos Vidal made history by scoring Chile's first-ever FIFA World Cup goal. It happened on their opening match against Mexico in Montevideo.

Player	Goals	1930	1950	1962	1966	1974	1982	1998	2010	2014
Leonel Sánchez	4			4						
Marcelo Salas	4							4		
Carlos Vidal	2	2								
Guillermo Subiabre	2	2								
Atilio Cremaschi	2		2							
Jaime Ramírez	2			2						
Jorge Toro	2			2						
Eladio Rojas	2			2						
Rubén Marcos	2				2					
Jean Beausejour	2								1	1
Alexis Sánchez	2									2
Andrés Prieto	1		1							
Fernando Riera	1		1							
George Robledo	1		1							
Sergio Ahumada	1					1				
Gustavo Moscoso	1						1			
Miguel Ángel Neira	1						1			
Juan Carlos Letelier	1						1			
José Luis Sierra	1							1		
Mark González	1								1	
Rodrigo Millar	1								1	
Charles Aránguiz	1									1
Jorge Valdivia	1									1
Eduardo Vargas	1									1
Own goals	1	1								
Total	40	5	5	10	2	1	3	5	3	6

== Awards ==
=== Team awards ===
- Third Place 1962

=== Individual awards ===
- Golden Boot 1962: Leonel Sánchez (shared)
- Bronze Ball 1962: Leonel Sánchez

== See also ==
- Chile at the Copa América
- Chile at the FIFA Confederations Cup
- South American nations at the FIFA World Cup
