= Chile at the Copa América =

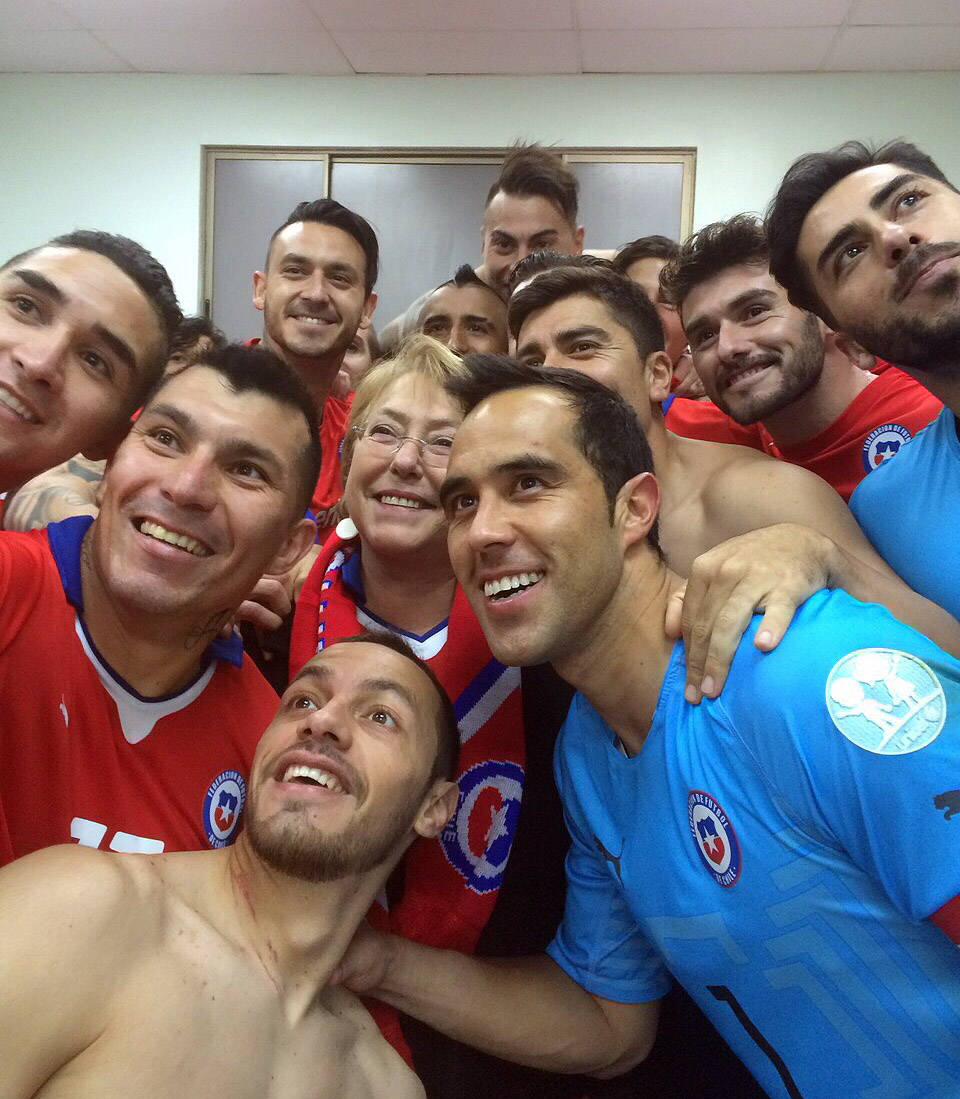
Chilean players with president Michelle Bachelet after the opening match of their home tournament in 2015, a 2–0 win against Ecuador

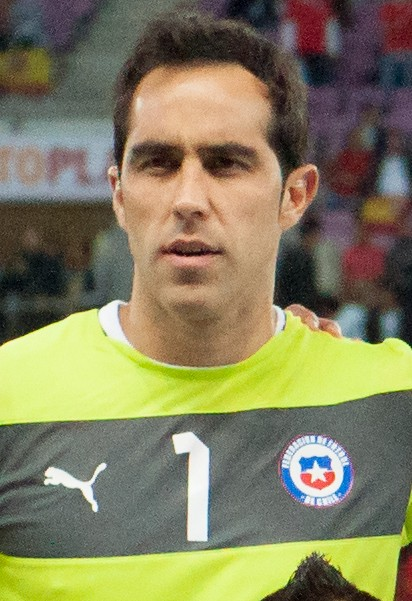
Claudio Bravo was Chile's captain in 2015 and 2016, winning two Copa titles. In addition, he was honoured as the tournament's best goalkeeper both times.

The Copa América is South America's major tournament in senior men's football and determines the continental champion. Until 1967, the tournament was known as South American Championship. It is the oldest continental championship in the world.

Chile are one of the four national teams that participated in the inaugural South American Championship in 1916. During their first six participations, they always ranked last, until they recorded their first match wins in 1926.

It took 99 years for them to win their first continental title, which they defended at the Copa América Centenario in 2016.

Chile won both the 2015 and 2016 final against Argentina on penalties, even though they have never defeated the Albiceleste over regular time in tournament history (30 attempts).

== Overall record ==
South American Championship / Copa América record
Year	Round	Position	Pld	W	D	L	GF	GA	Squad
(Argentina) 1916	Fourth place	4th	3	0	1	2	2	11	Squad
(Uruguay) 1917	Fourth place	4th	3	0	0	3	0	10	Squad
(Brazil) 1919	Fourth place	4th	3	0	0	3	1	12	Squad
(Chile) 1920	Fourth place	4th	3	0	1	2	2	4	Squad
(Argentina) 1921	Withdrew								
(Brazil) 1922	Fifth place	5th	4	0	1	3	1	10	Squad
(Uruguay) 1923	Withdrew								
(Uruguay) 1924	Fourth place	4th	3	0	0	3	1	10	Squad
(Argentina) 1925	Withdrew								
(Chile) 1926	Third place	3rd	4	2	1	1	14	6	Squad
(Peru) 1927	Withdrew								
(Argentina) 1929	Did not participate								
(Peru) 1935	Fourth place	4th	3	0	0	3	2	7	Squad
(Argentina) 1937	Fifth place	5th	5	1	1	3	12	13	Squad
(Peru) 1939	Fourth place	4th	4	1	0	3	8	12	Squad
(Chile) 1941	Third place	3rd	4	2	0	2	6	3	Squad
(Uruguay) 1942	Sixth place	6th	6	1	1	4	4	15	Squad
(Chile) 1945	Third place	3rd	6	4	1	1	15	5	Squad
(Argentina) 1946	Fifth place	5th	5	2	0	3	8	11	Squad
(Ecuador) 1947	Fourth place	4th	7	4	1	2	14	13	Squad
(Brazil) 1949	Fifth place	5th	7	2	1	4	10	14	Squad
(Peru) 1953	Fourth place	4th	6	3	1	2	10	10	Squad
(Chile) 1955	Runners-up	2nd	5	3	1	1	19	8	Squad
(Uruguay) 1956	Runners-up	2nd	5	3	0	2	11	8	Squad
(Peru) 1957	Sixth place	6th	6	1	1	4	9	17	Squad
(Argentina) 1959	Fifth place	5th	6	2	1	3	9	14	Squad
(Ecuador) 1959	Did not participate								
(Bolivia) 1963	Did not participate								
(Uruguay) 1967	Third place	3rd	5	2	2	1	8	6	Squad
1975	Group stage	6th	4	1	1	2	7	6	Squad
1979	Runners-up	2nd	9	4	3	2	13	6	Squad
1983	Group stage	5th	4	2	1	1	8	2	Squad
(Argentina) 1987	Runners-up	2nd	4	3	0	1	9	3	Squad
(Brazil) 1989	Group stage	5th	4	2	0	2	7	5	Squad
(Chile) 1991	Third place	3rd	7	3	2	2	11	6	Squad
(Ecuador) 1993	Group stage	9th	3	1	0	2	3	4	Squad
(Uruguay) 1995	Group stage	11th	3	0	1	2	3	8	Squad
(Bolivia) 1997	Group stage	11th	3	0	0	3	1	5	Squad
(Paraguay) 1999	Fourth place	4th	6	2	1	3	8	7	Squad
(Colombia) 2001	Quarter-finals	7th	4	2	0	2	5	5	Squad
(Peru) 2004	Group stage	10th	3	0	1	2	2	4	Squad
(Venezuela) 2007	Quarter-finals	8th	4	1	1	2	4	11	Squad
(Argentina) 2011	Quarter-finals	5th	4	2	1	1	5	4	Squad
(Chile) 2015	Champions	1st	6	4	2	0	13	4	Squad
(United States) 2016	Champions	1st	6	4	1	1	16	5	Squad
(Brazil) 2019	Fourth place	4th	6	2	1	3	7	7	Squad
(Brazil) 2021	Quarter-finals	7th	5	1	2	2	3	5	Squad
(United States) 2024	Group stage	12th	3	0	2	1	0	1	Squad
Total	2 Titles	41/48	191	67	35	89	291	317	—

== Winning tournaments ==
=== 2015 Copa América ===
==== Matches ====
Round	Opponent	Score	Result	Scorers	Venue
Group stage	Ecuador	2–0	W	A. Vidal, E. Vargas	Santiago
Group stage	Mexico	3–3	D	A. Vidal (2), E. Vargas	Santiago
Group stage	Bolivia	5–0	W	C. Aránguiz (2), A. Sánchez, G. Medel, R. Raldes (o.g.)	Santiago
Quarter-finals	Uruguay	1–0	W	M. Isla	Santiago
Semi-finals	Peru	2–1	W	E. Vargas (2)	Santiago
Final	Argentina	0–0 (a.e.t.) (4–1 p)	W		Santiago

==== Final ====
4 July 2015
17:00 CLT (UTC-3)

Chile	0–0 (a.e.t.)	Argentina
	Report
Penalties
Fernández (penalty scored); Vidal (penalty scored); Aránguiz (penalty scored); Sánchez (penalty scored)	4–1	(penalty scored) Messi; (penalty missed) Higuaín; (penalty missed) Banega

Estadio Nacional, Santiago
Attendance: 45,693
Referee: Wilmar Roldán (Colombia)

Chile	Argentina

GK	1	Claudio Bravo (c)
CB	5	Francisco Silva	(yellow card) 24'
CB	21	Marcelo Díaz	(yellow card) 34'
CB	17	Gary Medel	(yellow card) 44'
RM	4	Mauricio Isla
CM	20	Charles Aránguiz	(yellow card) 87'
CM	8	Arturo Vidal
LM	15	Jean Beausejour
AM	10	Jorge Valdivia		(substituted off) 75'
CF	11	Eduardo Vargas		(substituted off) 95'
CF	7	Alexis Sánchez
Substitutes:
MF	14	Matías Fernández		(substituted on) 75'
FW	22	Ángelo Henríquez		(substituted on) 95'
Manager:
(Argentina) Jorge Sampaoli

GK	1	Sergio Romero
RB	4	Pablo Zabaleta
CB	15	Martín Demichelis
CB	17	Nicolás Otamendi
LB	16	Marcos Rojo	(yellow card) 55'
RM	6	Lucas Biglia
CM	14	Javier Mascherano	(yellow card) 56'
LM	21	Javier Pastore		(substituted off) 81'
RW	10	Lionel Messi (c)
CF	11	Sergio Agüero		(substituted off) 74'
LW	7	Ángel Di María		(substituted off) 29'
Substitutes:
FW	22	Ezequiel Lavezzi		(substituted on) 29'
FW	9	Gonzalo Higuaín		(substituted on) 74'
MF	19	Éver Banega	(yellow card) 91'	(substituted on) 81'
Manager:
Gerardo Martino

Man of the Match: Arturo Vidal (Chile)

=== 2016 Copa América Centenario ===
==== Matches ====
Round	Opponent	Score	Result	Scorers	Venue
Group stage	Argentina	1–2	L	J. Fuenzalida	Santa Clara
Group stage	Bolivia	2–1	W	A. Vidal (2)	Foxboro
Group stage	Panama	4–2	W	E. Vargas (2), A. Sánchez (2)	Philadelphia
Quarter-finals	Mexico	7–0	W	E. Vargas (4), E. Puch (2), A. Sánchez	Santa Clara
Semi-finals	Colombia	2–0	W	C. Aránguiz, J. Fuenzalida	Chicago
Final	Argentina	0–0 (a.e.t.) (4–2 p)	W		East Rutherford

==== Final ====
Since the implementation of the new FIFA ruling that a fourth substitute would be allowed in overtime, the Copa América Centenario final was the first match this rule applied to. However, neither team used a fourth substitute.

26 June 2016
20:00 EDT

Argentina	0–0 (a.e.t.)	Chile
	Report (CONMEBOL); Report (CONCACAF)
Penalties
Messi (penalty missed); Mascherano (penalty scored); Agüero (penalty scored); Biglia (penalty missed)	2–4	(penalty missed) Vidal; (penalty scored) Castillo; (penalty scored) Aránguiz; (penalty scored) Beausejour; (penalty scored) Silva

MetLife Stadium, East Rutherford
Attendance: 82,026
Referee: Héber Lopes (Brazil)

Argentina	Chile

GK	1	Sergio Romero
RB	4	Gabriel Mercado
CB	17	Nicolás Otamendi
CB	13	Ramiro Funes Mori
LB	16	Marcos Rojo	(red card) 43'
CM	6	Lucas Biglia
CM	14	Javier Mascherano	(yellow card) 37'
CM	19	Éver Banega		(substituted off) 111'
RF	10	Lionel Messi (c)	(yellow card) 40'
CF	9	Gonzalo Higuaín		(substituted off) 70'
LF	7	Ángel Di María		(substituted off) 57'
Substitutions:
MF	5	Matías Kranevitter	(yellow card) 94'	(substituted on) 57'
FW	11	Sergio Agüero		(substituted on) 70'
MF	18	Erik Lamela		(substituted on) 111'
Manager:
Gerardo Martino

GK	1	Claudio Bravo (c)
RB	4	Mauricio Isla
CB	17	Gary Medel
CB	18	Gonzalo Jara
LB	15	Jean Beausejour	(yellow card) 52'
CM	8	Arturo Vidal	(yellow card) 37'
CM	21	Marcelo Díaz	(yellow card) 16' (yellow-red card) 28'
CM	20	Charles Aránguiz	(yellow card) 69'
RW	6	José Pedro Fuenzalida		(substituted off) 80'
LW	7	Alexis Sánchez		(substituted off) 104'
CF	11	Eduardo Vargas		(substituted off) 109'
Substitutions:
FW	22	Edson Puch		(substituted on) 80'
MF	5	Francisco Silva		(substituted on) 104'
FW	16	Nicolás Castillo		(substituted on) 109'
Manager:
(Spain) Juan Antonio Pizzi

Man of the Match:
Claudio Bravo (Chile)

== Record by opponent ==
Chile's biggest victories at Copa América tournaments were a 7–0 win against Venezuela in 1979, and a 7–0 win against Mexico in 2016.

Their biggest defeats were 0–6 losses, one against Brazil in 1919 and one against Uruguay in 1947.

Copa América matches (by team)
Opponent	W	D	L	Pld	GF	GA
Argentina	0	8	22	30	15	62
Bolivia	11	2	2	15	49	17
Brazil	3	2	17	22	25	61
Canada	0	1	0	1	0	0
Colombia	7	3	2	12	20	11
Costa Rica	0	0	1	1	1	2
Ecuador	13	1	1	15	47	15
Japan	1	0	0	1	4	0
Mexico	2	2	3	7	13	9
Panama	1	0	0	1	4	2
Paraguay	7	2	13	22	31	38
Peru	8	7	7	22	27	31
United States	0	0	1	1	1	2
Uruguay	7	5	19	31	29	63
Venezuela	7	2	1	10	25	4
Total	67	35	89	191	291	317

== Record players ==
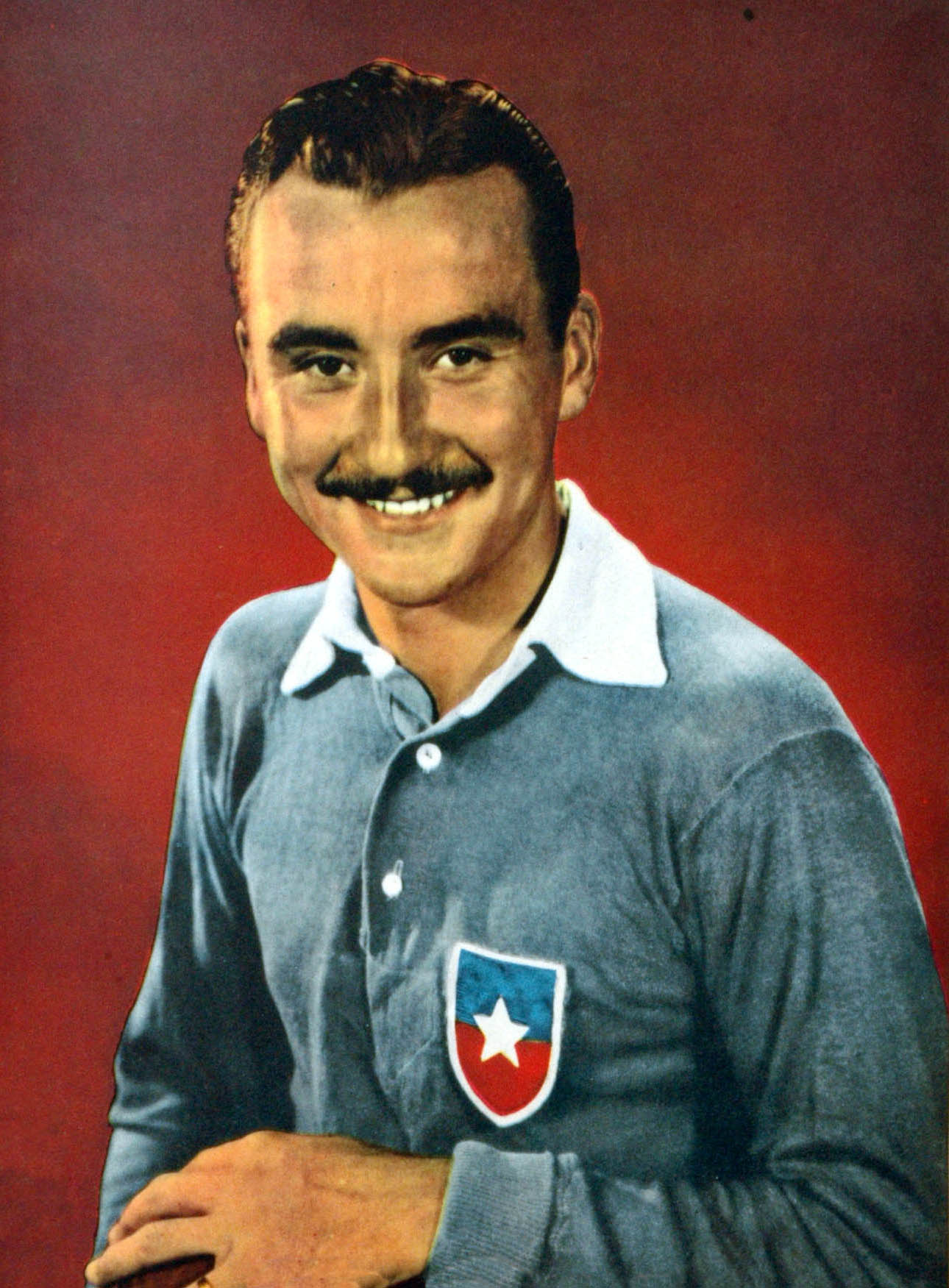
With 34 matches, Sergio Livingstone is the tournament's joint-record appearance maker. He won the award for best player in 1941, when Chile finished third.

Rank	Player	Matches	Tournaments
1	Sergio Livingstone	34	1941, 1942, 1945, 1947, 1949 and 1953
2	Claudio Bravo	27	2004, 2007, 2011, 2015, 2016, 2021 and 2024
2	Mauricio Isla	27	2011, 2015, 2016, 2019, 2021 and 2024
2	Gary Medel	27	2011, 2015, 2016, 2019 and 2021
5	Alexis Sánchez	26	2011, 2015, 2016, 2019, 2021 and 2024
5	Eduardo Vargas	26	2015, 2016, 2019, 2021 and 2024
7	Arturo Vidal	24	2011, 2015, 2016, 2019 and 2021
8	Charles Aránguiz	23	2015, 2016, 2019 and 2021
9	Manuel Álvarez	20	1947, 1949, 1953, 1955 and 1956
10	Gonzalo Jara	19	2007, 2011, 2015, 2016 and 2019

== Top goalscorers ==
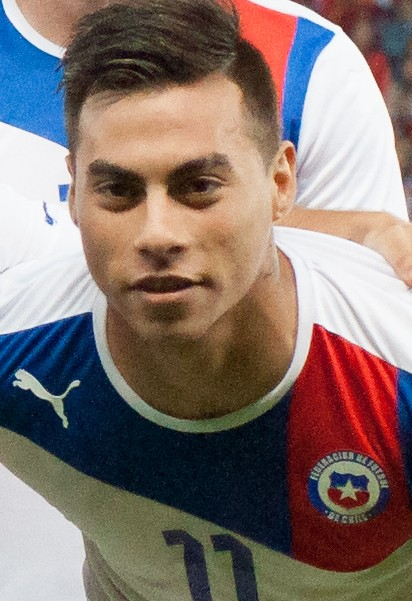
Eduardo Vargas was the tournament's top scorer in both 2015 and 2016.

Rank	Player	Goals	Tournaments (goals)
1	Eduardo Vargas	14	2015 (4), 2016 (6), 2019 (2) and 2021 (2)
2	Enrique Hormazábal	10	1955 (6) and 1956 (4)
3	Raúl Toro	9	1937 (7), 1939 (1) and 1941 (1)
4	David Arellano	8	1924 (1) and 1926 (7)
4	Iván Zamorano	8	1991 (5) and 1999 (3)
6	Francisco Molina	7	1953
6	Alexis Sánchez	7	2011 (1), 2015 (1), 2016 (3) and 2019 (2)
6	Arturo Vidal	7	2011 (1), 2015 (3), 2016 (2) and 2019 (1)
9	Juan Alcántara	6	1945 (5) and 1946 (1)
9	Jaime Ramírez	6	1955 (1), 1956 (2) and 1957 (3)

== Players with multiple titles ==
Fifteen players were part of both the 2015 and 2016 Copa América squads, winning consecutive titles. Johnny Herrera as reserve goalkeeper was a non-playing squad member in both tournaments.

Player	Championships	Player	Championships
Charles Aránguiz	2	Gary Medel	2
Jean Beausejour	2	Eugenio Mena	2
Claudio Bravo	2	Mauricio Pinilla	2
Marcelo Díaz	2	Alexis Sánchez	2
José Pedro Fuenzalida	2	Francisco Silva	2
Johnny Herrera	2	Eduardo Vargas	2
Mauricio Isla	2	Arturo Vidal	2
Gonzalo Jara	2		

== Awards and records ==
Team Awards

- Champions: 2 (2015 and 2016)
- Runners-up: 4 (1955, 1956, 1979 and 1987)
- Third place: 5 (1926, 1941, 1945, 1967 and 1991)

Individual Awards

- MVP 1941: Sergio Livingstone
- MVP 1955: Enrique Hormazábal
- MVP 1979: Carlos Caszely
- MVP 2016: Alexis Sánchez
- Top scorer 1926: David Arellano (7 goals)
- Top scorer 1937: Raúl Toro (7 goals)
- Top scorer 1953: Francisco Molina (7 goals)
- Top scorer 1956: Enrique Hormazábal (4 goals)
- Top scorer 1979: Jorge Peredo (4 goals) (shared)
- Top scorer 2015: Eduardo Vargas (4 goals) (shared)
- Top scorer 2016: Eduardo Vargas (6 goals)
- Best goalkeeper 2015: Claudio Bravo
- Best goalkeeper 2016: Claudio Bravo

Team records

- Victory with highest number of goals conceded (5–4 v Peru in 1955; tied with Brazil 6–4 Chile in 1937 and Bolivia 5–4 Brazil in 1963)

Individual Records

- Most matches: Sergio Livingstone (34, shared with Lionel Messi)
- Longest time span between two matches: David Pizarro (15 years and 333 days, semi-final v Uruguay in 1999 to group match v Ecuador in 2015)

== See also ==
- Chile at the FIFA Confederations Cup
- Chile at the FIFA World Cup
