= Puchades =

Puchades is a Spanish surname. Notable people with the surname include:

- Antonio Puchades (1925–2013), Spanish footballer
- Luis Planas Puchades (born 1952), Spanish labour inspector, diplomat, and politician
