= Carlos Ibáñez (Chilean footballer) =

Chilean footballer (1930-2015)

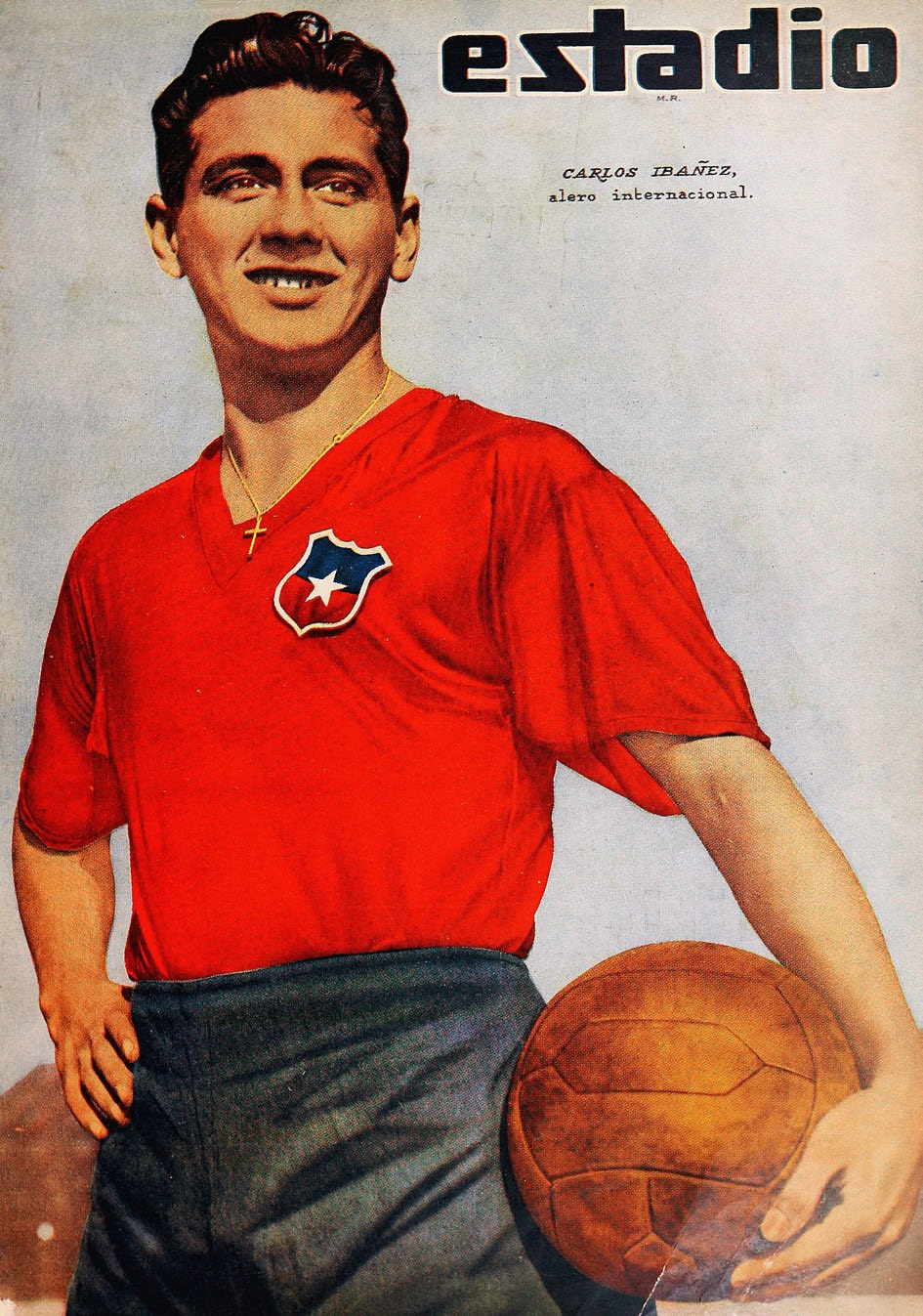

Personal information
- Full name: Carlos Ibáñez García
- Date of birth: 28 November 1930
- Date of death: 26 September 2015 (aged 84)
- Position: Forward

Senior career*
Years	Team	Apps	(Gls)
	Magallanes	?	(?)

International career
1950	Chile	1	(0)
- * Club domestic league appearances and goals

Carlos Ibáñez García (28 November 1930 – 26 September 2015) was a Chilean football forward who played for Chile in the 1950 FIFA World Cup. He also played for Magallanes.

Ibáñez died on 26 September 2015, at the age of 84.

== Record at FIFA Tournaments ==
National team	Year	Apps	Goals
Chile	1950	1	0
