= Fernando Roldán =

Chilean footballer (1930–2019)

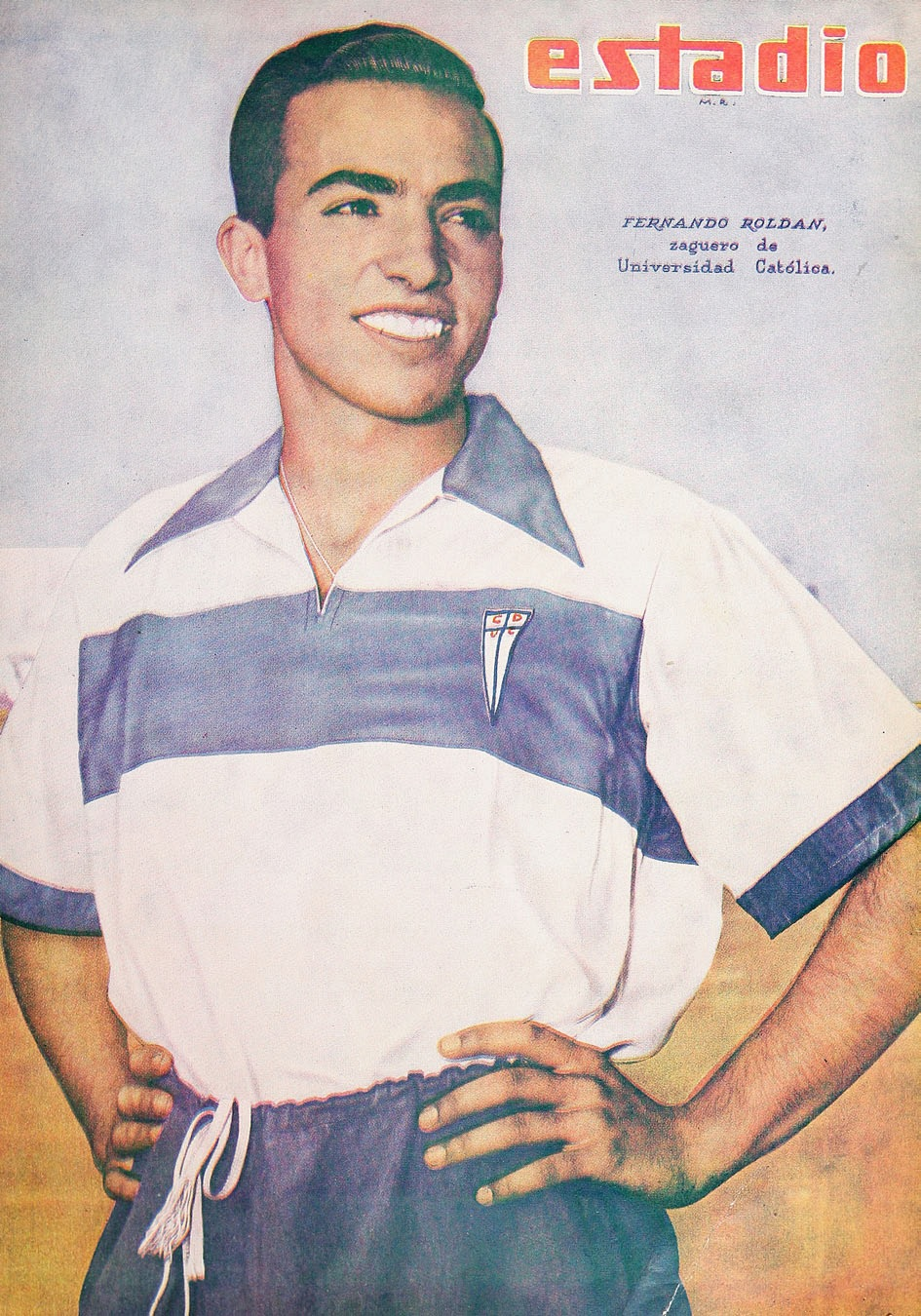

Personal information
- Full name: Víctor Luis Fernando Roldán Campos
- Date of birth: 15 October 1921
- Place of birth: Chile
- Date of death: 23 June 2019 (aged 97)
- Position: Defender

Senior career*
Years	Team	Apps	(Gls)
- Club Deportivo Universidad Católica

International career
1950–1954	Chile	17	(0)
- * Club domestic league appearances and goals

Víctor Luis Fernando Roldán Campos (15 October 1921 – 23 June 2019) was a Chilean football defender who played for Chile in the 1950 FIFA World Cup. He also played for Club Deportivo Universidad Católica.
