= Miguel Busquets =

Chilean footballer (1920-2002)

Miguel Busquéts
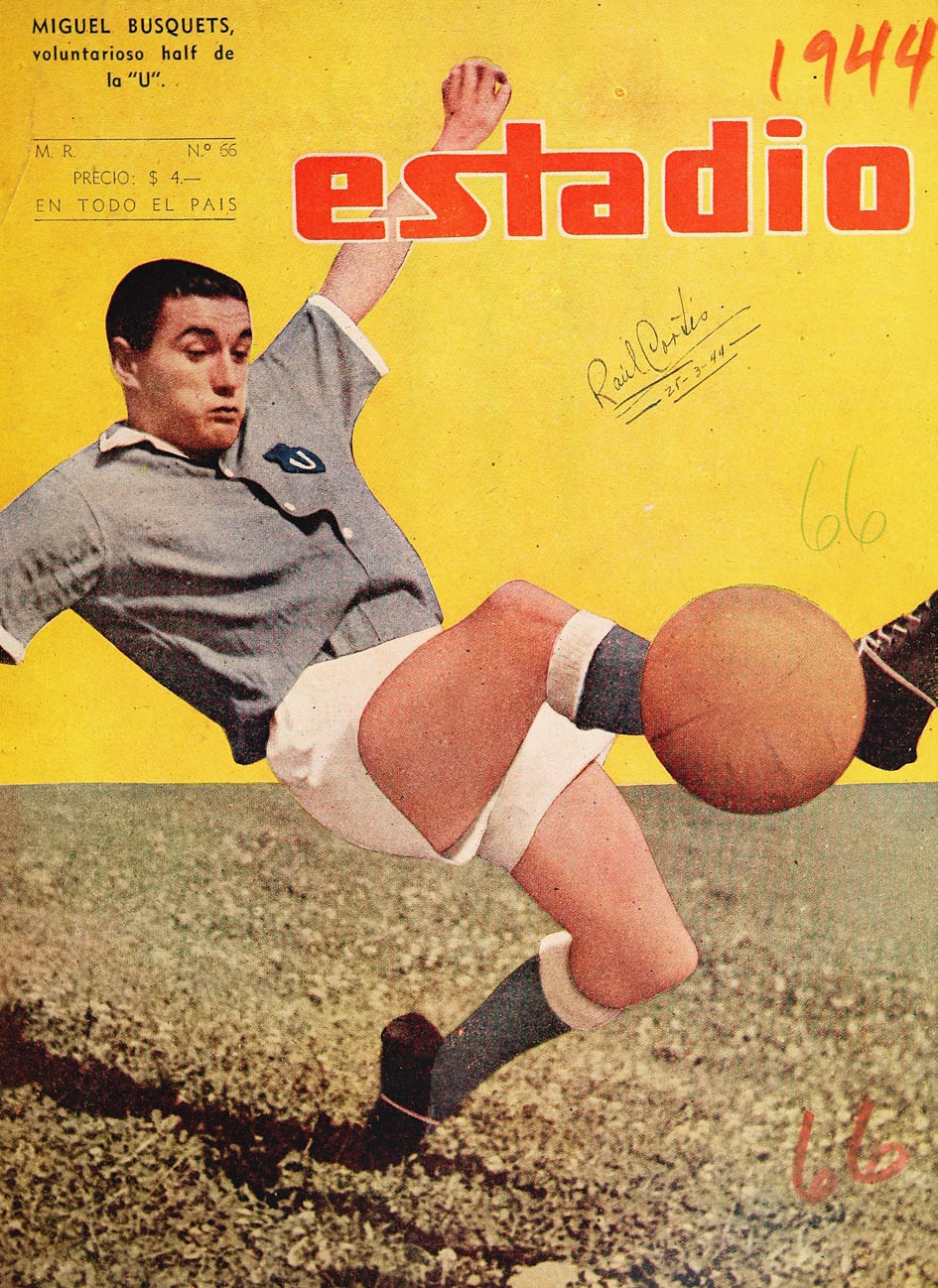

Personal information
- Full name: Miguel Busquéts Terrazas
- Date of birth: 15 October 1920
- Date of death: 24 December 2002 (aged 82)
- Position: Midfielder

Senior career*
Years	Team	Apps	(Gls)
1939	Unión Española		
1940–1952	Universidad de Chile	200	(15)
1953	Universidad Católica		

International career
1945-1950	Chile	18	(0)

Managerial career
- 1952: Universidad de Chile (interim)
- * Club domestic league appearances and goals

Miguel Busquéts Terrazas (15 October 1920 – 24 December 2002) was a Chilean football midfielder who played for the Chile national football team in the 1950 FIFA World Cup.

== Career ==
Busquets began his career with Unión Española in 1939. The next year, he switched to Universidad de Chile, staying with them until 1952, having made two hundred appearances and scored fifteen goals. His last club was Universidad Católica in 1953.

Subsequently to leave Universidad de Chile as a player, he led them as an interim coach.

== Record at FIFA Tournaments ==
National team	Year	Apps	Goals
Chile	1950	3	0
