= Andrés Prieto (footballer, born 1928) =

Chilean footballer (1928–2022)

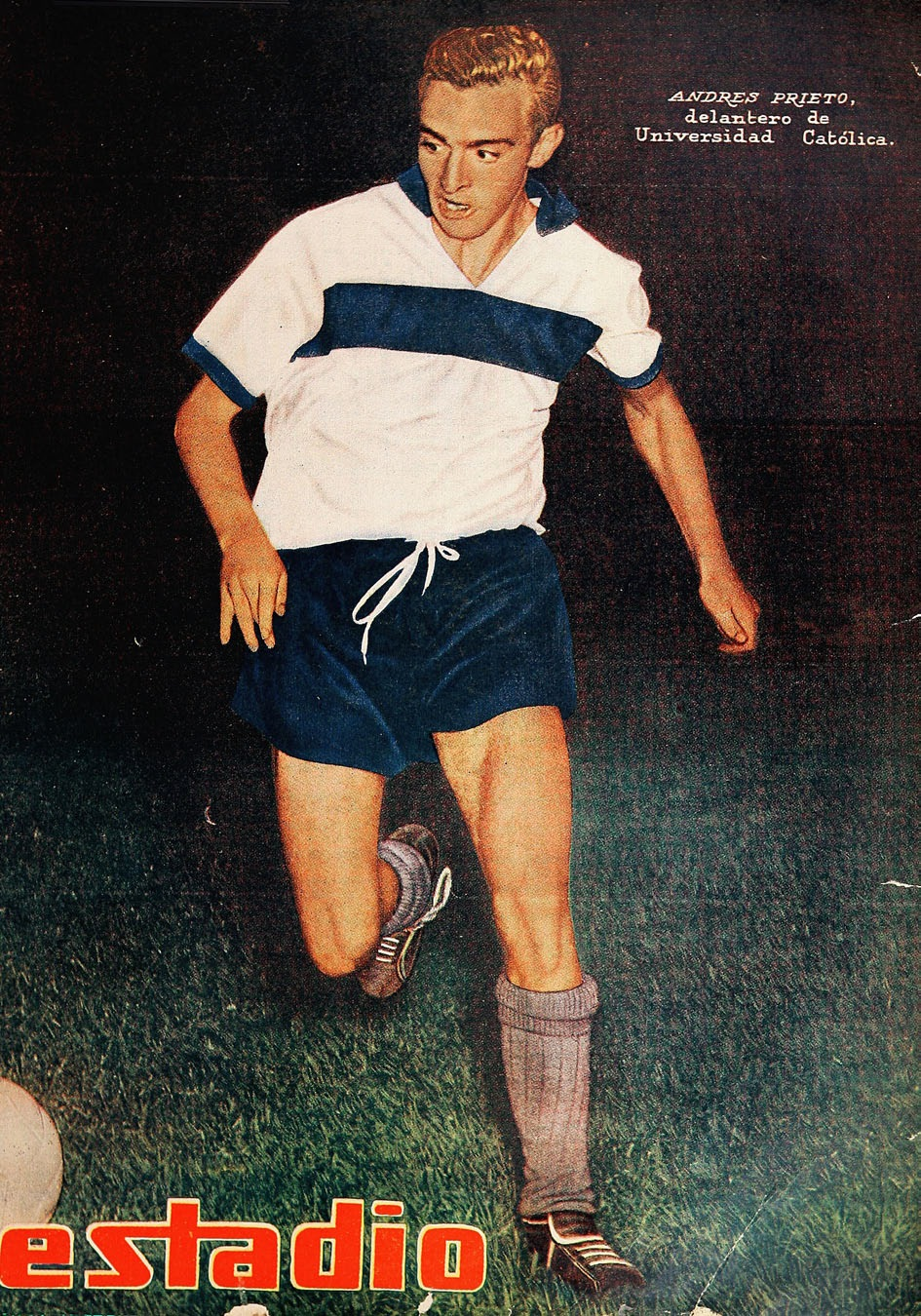
- Prieto with Universidad Católica in 1950

Personal information
- Full name: Andrés Prieto Urrejola
- Date of birth: 19 December 1928
- Place of birth: Santiago, Chile
- Date of death: 25 September 2022 (aged 93)
- Height: 1.76 m (5 ft 9 in)
- Position: Forward

Senior career*
Years	Team	Apps	(Gls)
1947–1952	Universidad Católica		
1953	Deportivo Vasco		
1953–1955	Español	16	(4)
1955–1957	Universidad Católica		

International career
1947–1957	Chile	16	(8)
1949	Chile U22		

Managerial career
- 1962: San Luis
- 1963–1966: Universidad Católica
- 1966–1967: Colo-Colo
- 1967: América
- 1968: Unión Española
- 1969–1970: Huachipato
- 1971: Platense
- 1971: Vélez Sarsfield
- 1972: San Lorenzo
- 1973–1975: Liverpool
- 1976: Defensor Sporting
- 1977–1979: Cobreloa
- 1980: Universidad Católica
- 1981: Deportes Iquique
- 1983: Unión San Felipe
- 1984–1985: Bolívar
- 1986–1987: Real Santa Cruz
- 1988: Coquimbo Unido
- 1988: Naval
- 1989–1990: Cobreloa
- * Club domestic league appearances and goals

Andrés Rafael Prieto Urrejola (19 December 1928 – 25 September 2022) was a Chilean football forward who played for Chile in the 1950 FIFA World Cup. He also played for Club Deportivo Universidad Católica.

== International career ==
Prieto represented Chile at youth level in the 1949 Juventud de América Tournament, alongside players such as Misael Escuti, Manuel Álvarez, Arturo Farías, among others.

At senior level, he made 16 appearances for the Chile national team and scored 8 goals.

== Personal life and death ==
His father, Fernando Prieto Concha, nicknamed Palomeque, was one of the founders of C.D. Green Cross as well as a forward of the same club.

Prieto was the older brother of the Chilean former international footballer, Ignacio Prieto. His son, José Antonio or Toño, is a well-known sports journalist in Chilean radio media.

His nickname was Chuleta (Cheat Sheet) since he was a primary student.

Prieto died on 25 September 2022, at the age of 93.
