= Arturo Farías =

Chilean footballer (1927-1992)

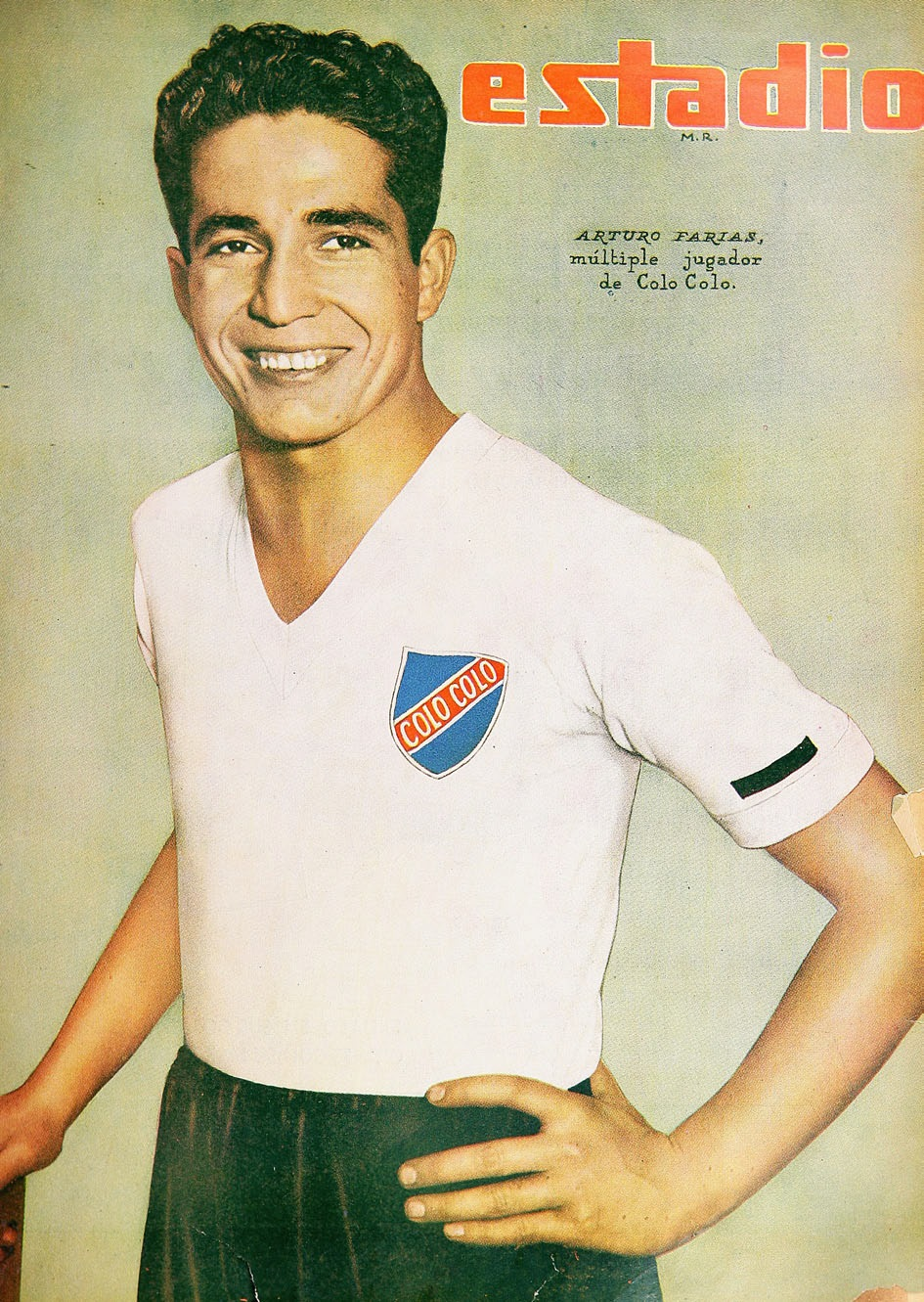

Personal information
- Full name: Arturo Farías Barraza
- Date of birth: 1 September 1927
- Place of birth: Chile
- Position: Defender

Senior career*
Years	Team	Apps	(Gls)
1940–1948	Santiago Morning		
1948–1958	Colo-Colo		

International career
1950-1954	Chile	24	(0)
- * Club domestic league appearances and goals

Arturo Farías Barraza (September 1, 1927 – October 19, 1992) was a Chilean footballer who played for Colo-Colo and Santiago Morning of Chile and in the Chile national football team in the FIFA World Cup Brazil 1950.

== Titles ==
- Colo-Colo 1953 and 1958 (Chilean Championship)
