= Antonio Puchades =

Spanish footballer

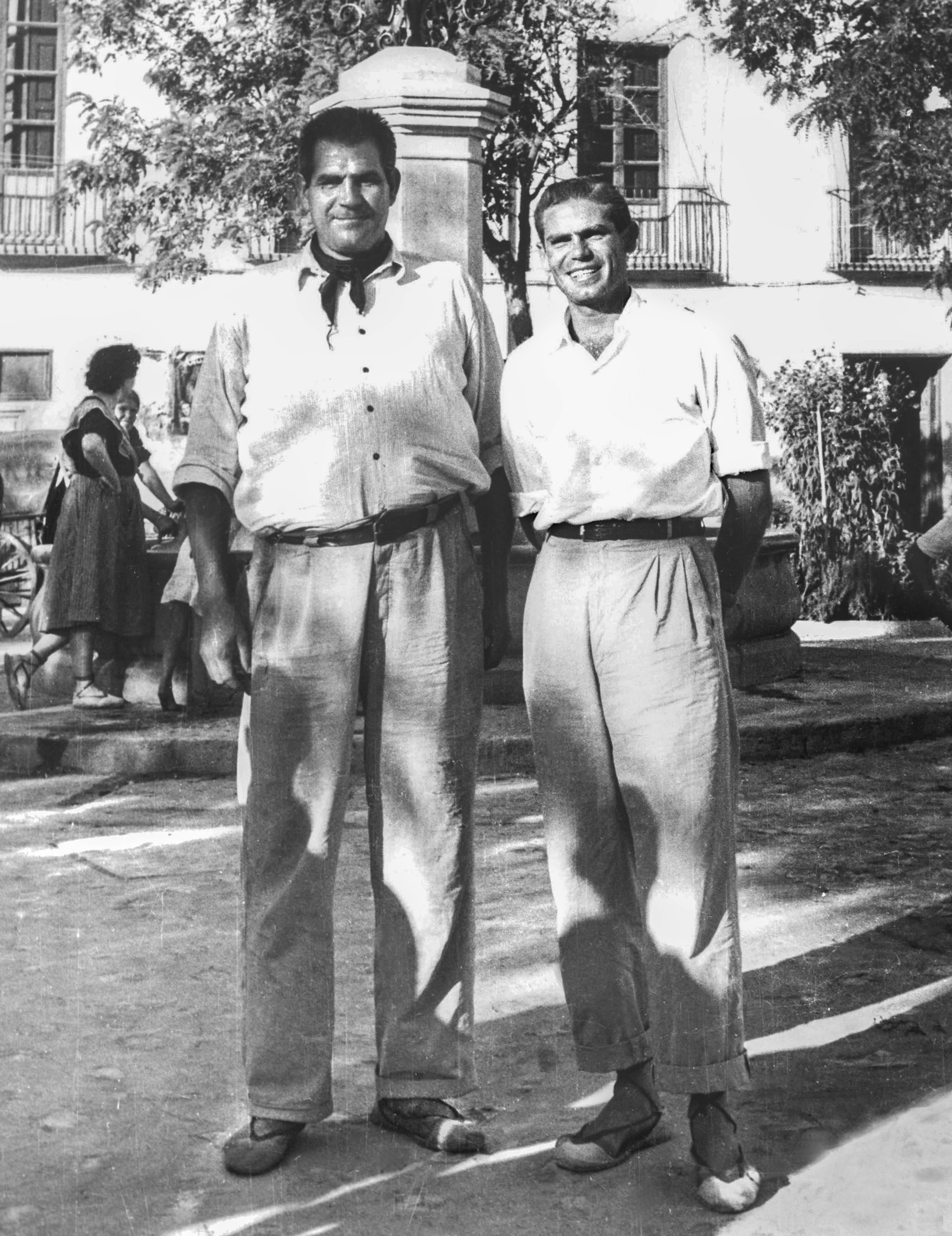
- Puchades (right) in 1950

Personal information
- Full name: Antonio Puchades Casanova
- Date of birth: 4 June 1925
- Place of birth: Sueca, Spain
- Date of death: 24 May 2013 (aged 87)
- Place of death: Sueca, Spain
- Height: 1.79 m (5 ft 10 in)
- Position: Defensive midfielder

Youth career
- Sueca
- Valencia

Senior career*
Years	Team	Apps	(Gls)
1945–1946	Mestalla		
1946–1958	Valencia	256	(4)

International career
1949–1954	Spain	23	(0)
- * Club domestic league appearances and goals

Antonio Puchades Casanova (4 June 1925 – 24 May 2013) was a Spanish footballer who played as a defensive midfielder.

== Club career ==
Born in Sueca, Valencian Community, Puchades played solely for Valencia CF during his career, signing in 1945 and going on to spend 12 seasons in La Liga, with 301 total matches. In his first season with the first team, however, he appeared in only four games as the club won the national championship, becoming a regular from then onwards.

Puchades retired from football in 1958 at the age of 33, being awarded a testimonial match the following year against OGC Nice. He subsequently lost all connection to the football world, going on to work in family businesses.

== International career ==
Puchades won 23 caps for Spain over five years. He was a member of the 1950 FIFA World Cup squad, appearing in all six games as the nation finished fourth in Brazil.

== Death ==
Puchades, affectionally known as Tonico, died in his hometown of Sueca on 24 May 2013, two weeks shy of his 88th birthday.

== Honours ==
Valencia

- La Liga: 1946–47
- Copa del Generalísimo: 1948–49, 1954
- Copa Eva Duarte: 1949

== See also ==
- List of one-club men
