= Sergio Livingstone =

Chilean footballer and journalist (1920-2012)

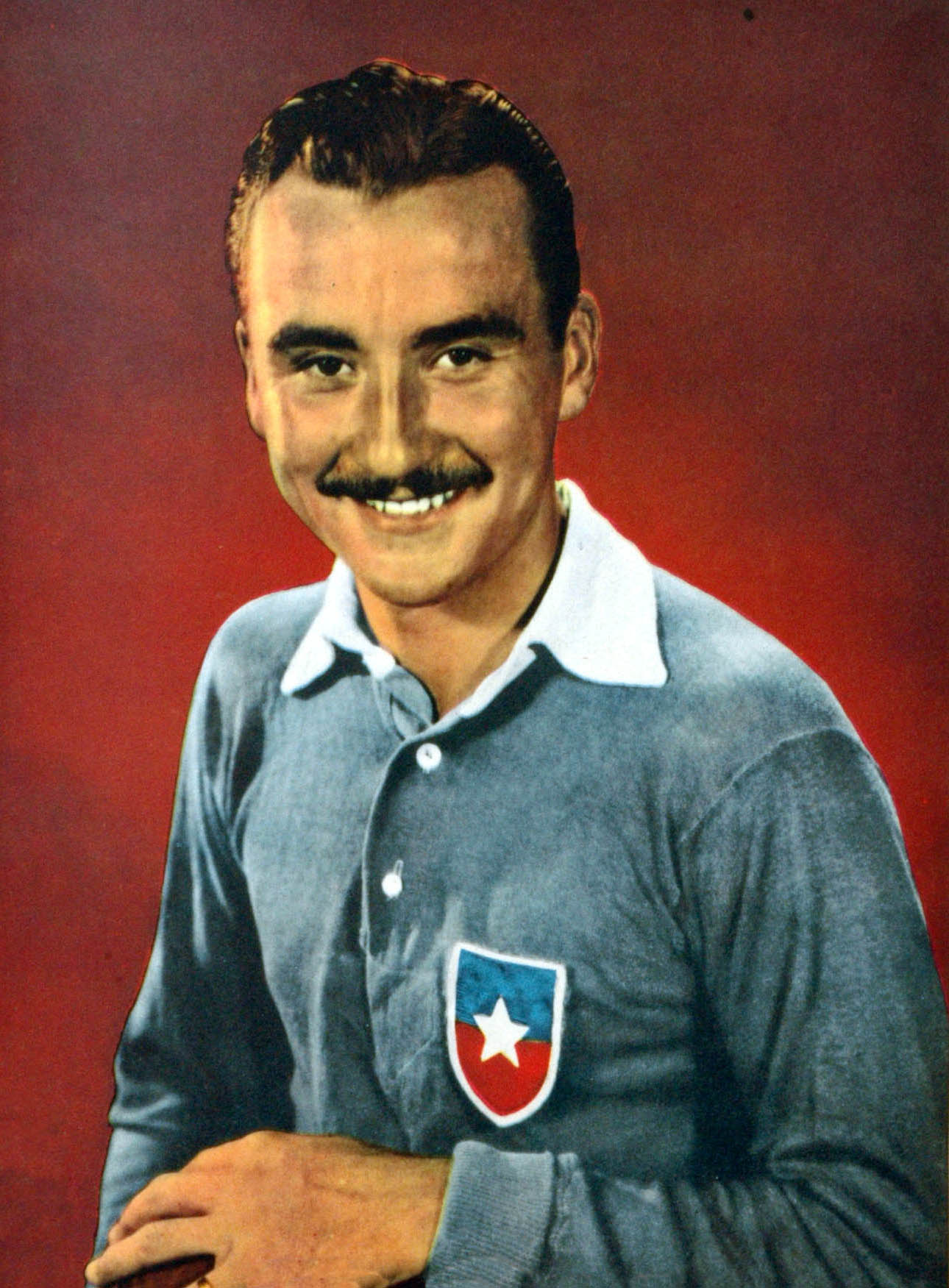
- Livingstone with Chile in 1942

Personal information
- Full name: Serjio Roberto Livingstone Pohlhammer
- Date of birth: 26 March 1920
- Place of birth: Santiago, Chile
- Date of death: 11 September 2012 (aged 92)
- Place of death: Santiago, Chile
- Height: 1.81 m (5 ft 11 in)
- Position: Goalkeeper

Youth career
- 1936–1937: Unión Española

Senior career*
Years	Team	Apps	(Gls)
1938–1942	Universidad Católica	?	(?)
1943	Racing Club	30	(0)
1944–1956	Universidad Católica	?	(?)
1957	Colo-Colo	?	(?)
1958–1959	Universidad Católica	?	(?)

International career
1941–1954	Chile	52	(0)
- * Club domestic league appearances and goals as of September 2008

Serjio Robert "Sergio" Livingstone Pohlhammer (26 March 1920 – 11 September 2012) was a Chilean goalkeeper, who later became a well-regarded journalist. He was nicknamed "El Sapo" ("the toad") for his typical posture in the goal. From 1938 to 1959 he played primarily for CD Universidad Católica in Santiago. With Chile he took part in seven Copa América and one FIFA World Cup, earning 52 caps. IFFHS rated him as the 9th greatest South American keeper of the 20th century.

== Career ==
Serjio (later Sergio) Livingstone's family hailed from Scotland. His father John Livingstone Eves, who played for Santiago National, was a pioneer of the game in Chile and his mother, Ana Pohlhammer Caamaño, died when Sergio was 11 years old. Livingstone originally joined Unión Española in 1936, after Luis Tirado watched him in a match between St. Ignatius College, where he studied, and English Institute of Santiago. He abandoned football to study law at the Pontificia Universidad Católica de Chile. Soon he acquainted himself with the university's football team, and from 1938 he began to establish himself as the goalkeeper of CD Universidad Católica.

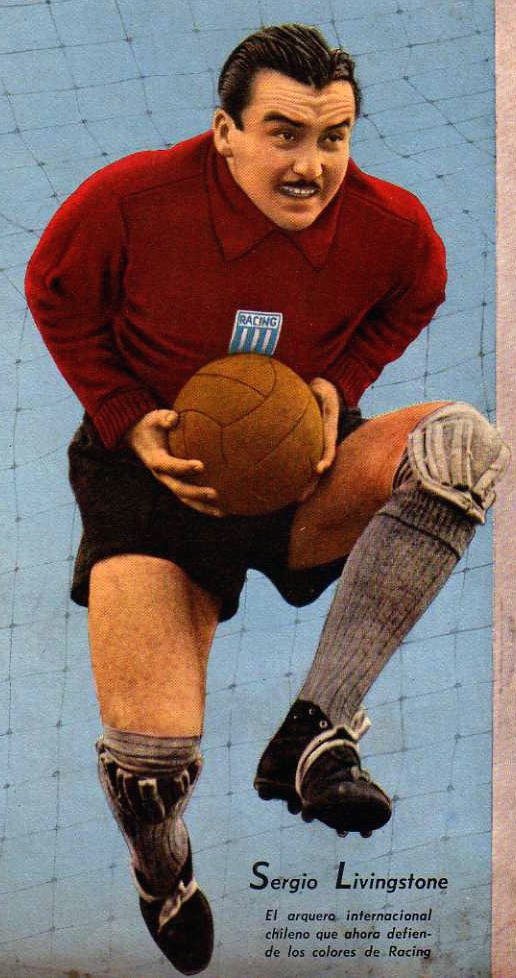
Livingstone playing for Racing Club in 1943

He debuted in the national team at the 1941 South American Championship which took place in Chile, winning 5–0 against Ecuador. By the end of the tournament Chile ended third, and Livingstone was considered the best player of the tournament. Altogether, Livingstone played between 1941 and 1954 in 52 matches for Chile, which made him the country's record international until 1962, participating in five more South American Championships, totaling 34 matches in this competition, which remains record. He also took part in the FIFA World Cup 1950 in Brazil, where Chile exited after the first group phase. In the tournament, he was the first goalkeeper to play with short-sleeved shirts, something which would not become commonplace until six decades later.

At club level he spent 1943 in Argentina playing 30 matches for Racing Club. He cut short his time in Argentina for sentimental reasons and rejoined Católica in 1944, winning the national championships of 1949 and 1954. After the second title the club had the misfortune to be relegated in the season immediately thereafter, but managed to return to the first division as quickly. After a brief spell on loan in 1957 with Colo-Colo he once more returned to Universidad Católica where he finished his career in 1959. Following his football career, he became a well-known sports journalist and television personality with Televisión Nacional de Chile, where he remained until his death (more than 60 years).

== Legacy ==
In 2009, a street in the district of Independencia in Santiago was named for Livingstone.

== Honours ==
- Championship of Chile: 1949, 1954
