= Atilio Cremaschi =

Chilean footballer (1923-2007)

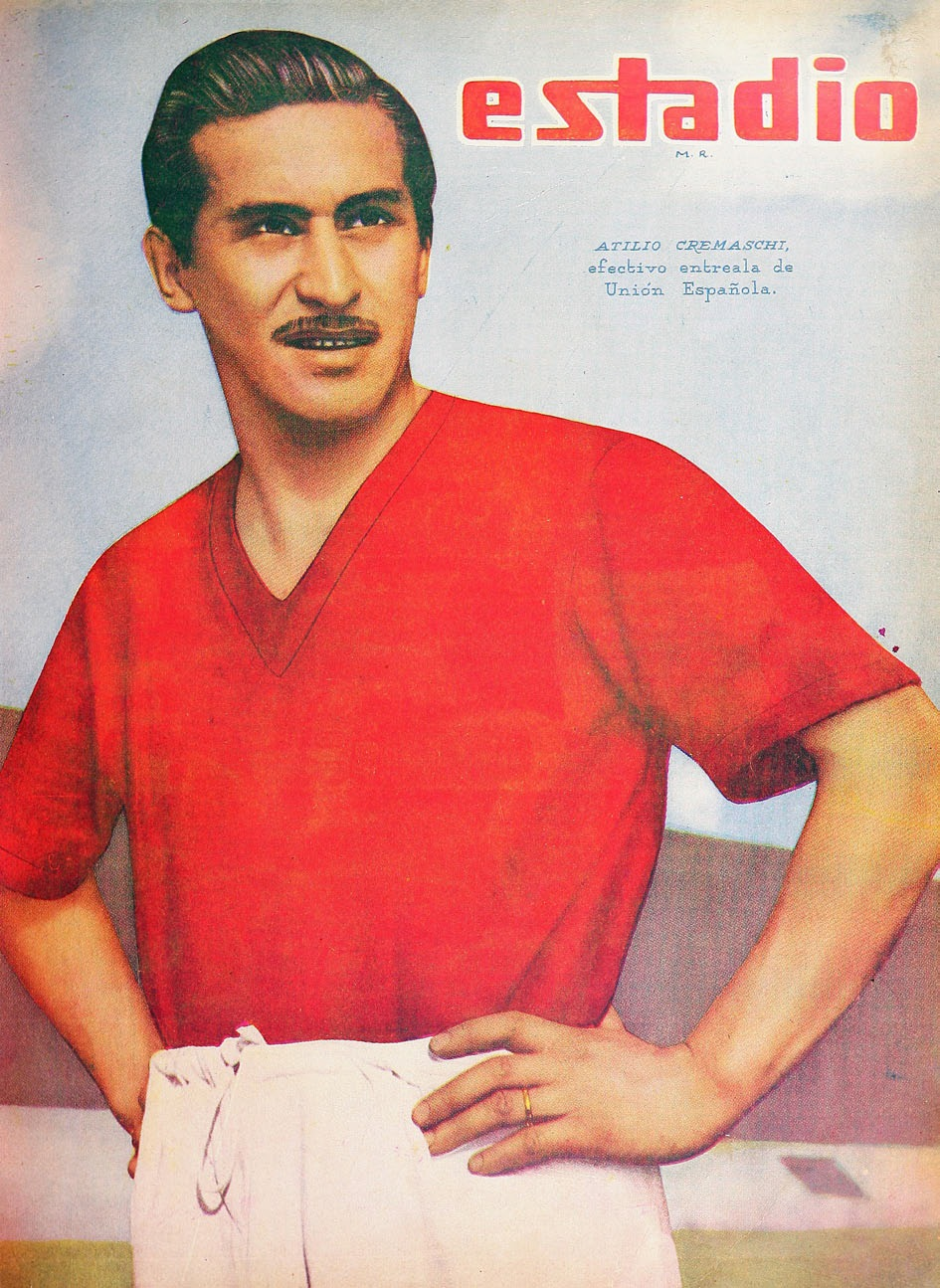
- Cremaschi in 1949

Personal information
- Full name: Atilio Cremaschi Oyarzún
- Date of birth: 8 March 1923
- Place of birth: Punta Arenas, Chile
- Date of death: 3 September 2007 (aged 84)
- Place of death: Santiago, Chile
- Position: Forward

Youth career
- Deportivo Victoria
- 1937–1939: Audax Italiano PA

Senior career*
Years	Team	Apps	(Gls)
1939–1940	Audax Italiano PA		
1941–1952	Unión Española		
1953–1958	Colo-Colo	108	(50)
1959–1960	Rangers de Talca		

International career
1945–1954	Chile	31	(10)
- * Club domestic league appearances and goals

Atilio Cremaschi Oyarzún (8 March 1923 – 3 September 2007) was a Chilean footballer who played for Unión Española, Colo-Colo and Rangers of Chile and in the Chile national football team in the 1950 FIFA World Cup in Brazil.

== Career ==
Born in Punta Arenas, Chile, Cremaschi was with the local teams Deportivo Victoria and Audax Italiano as a youth player.

In 1937, he was promoted to the first team of Audax Italiano, aged 16, and moved to Santiago to join Unión Española in 1941 thanks to José Ferrera, a football leader.

He won league titles of the Chilean Primera División with Unión Española in 1943 and 1951 and Colo-Colo in 1953 and 1956. He ended his career with Rangers de Talca in 1960.

== International career ==
Cremaschi was selected in the 20-man squad in the 1945 South American Championship. Cremaschi made his debut for Chile in a 2–0 win against Colombia. As the team would finish 3rd and didn't win the cup.

Cremaschi would again be selected in the 20-man squad in the 1946 South American Championship. He would score his first goal for Chile in a 2–1 win against Paraguay. would score a brace in a 4–1 win against Bolivia. Despite scoring three goals, the team finished 5th.

He was not selected for the 20-man squad for the following year. However he did make the final squad in the 1949 tournament. In the tournament he would score in a 4–2 loss against Paraguay. He finished the tournament with two goals, but they would finish fifth again.

Despite not scoring any goals during the qualification, he would make the final 23-man squad for the 1950 FIFA World Cup. He would make his World Cup debut in a 2–0 loss against England.

He would score his first two World Cup goals in a 5–2 win against United States. Chile would finish third in the group and failed to advance to the knockout stage.

He was selected in the final squad in the 1952 Panamerican Championship. He would score two goals in that tournament, and the team would finish runner-up. He was selected in the 18-man squad in the 1953 South American Championship. He would score only one goal against Ecuador which ended in a 3–1 win. Chile would finish fourth.

On 14 March 1954, Cremaschi would make his last international appearance in a 1–0 loss against Brazil, failing to qualify for the 1954 FIFA World Cup.

== Personal life ==
Cremaschi was of Italian descent, son of Guido Cremaschi Garbagnoli and Ana Celia Oyarzún.

As a student, Cremaschi attended the Don Bosco School based in Punta Arenas.

In addition to football, Cremaschi also played other sports like boxing.

His grandson is Benjamin Cremaschi, who is also a professional footballer who plays for Parma, and the United States national team.

On 3 September 2007, Cremaschi died.

== Titles ==
Unión Española

- Primera División (2): 1943, 1951

Colo-Colo

- Primera División (2): 1953, 1956
- Copa Chile (1): 1958
