= Joe Maca =

Belgian-born American soccer player

Personal information
- Full name: Joseph Andre Maca
- Date of birth: September 28, 1920
- Place of birth: Brussels, Belgium
- Date of death: July 13, 1982 (aged 61)
- Place of death: Massapequa, New York, U.S.
- Position: Defender

Senior career*
Years	Team	Apps	(Gls)
1939–1947	CS La Forestoise	153	(3)

International career
1950	United States	3	(1)
- * Club domestic league appearances and goals

Joseph Andre Maca (September 28, 1920 – July 13, 1982) was a Belgian–American soccer player who earned three caps as left back for the United States men's national soccer team and played in the United States' 1–0 defeat of England in the 1950 FIFA World Cup.

Before World War II, Maca played for the Belgian Second Division team Royal Cercle Sportif La Forestoise (51) in Brussels. During the war, he served for 12 months in the Belgian Army where he played on the Army team. He also earned a medal for his role in the resistance. In 1942 Forest was promoted to the Belgian First Division and played there five years. Maca played 153 total games and scored 3 goals for CS La Forestoise.

After the war, he moved to the United States and joined Brooklyn Hispano of the American Soccer League. He was selected to the ASL All-Star Team in 1949 and 1950. His three caps for the U.S. team were all during the 1950 World Cup, where he scored one goal against Chile on a penalty kick. Although he was not a U.S. citizen, he had declared his intention to gain citizenship and under the rules of the United States Soccer Football Association at the time, he was eligible to play. He eventually did become a U.S. citizen in 1957.

After the World Cup, he moved to Belgium and played for Royal White Star Athletic Club (47) in 1950–51 before returning to the U.S. There he play just 9 games in the first round.

His son, Alain Maca, also represented the United States.

Maca was inducted to the National Soccer Hall of Fame in 1976 along with his 1950 U.S. teammates.
