= Manuel Álvarez (footballer) =

Chilean footballer (1928-1998)

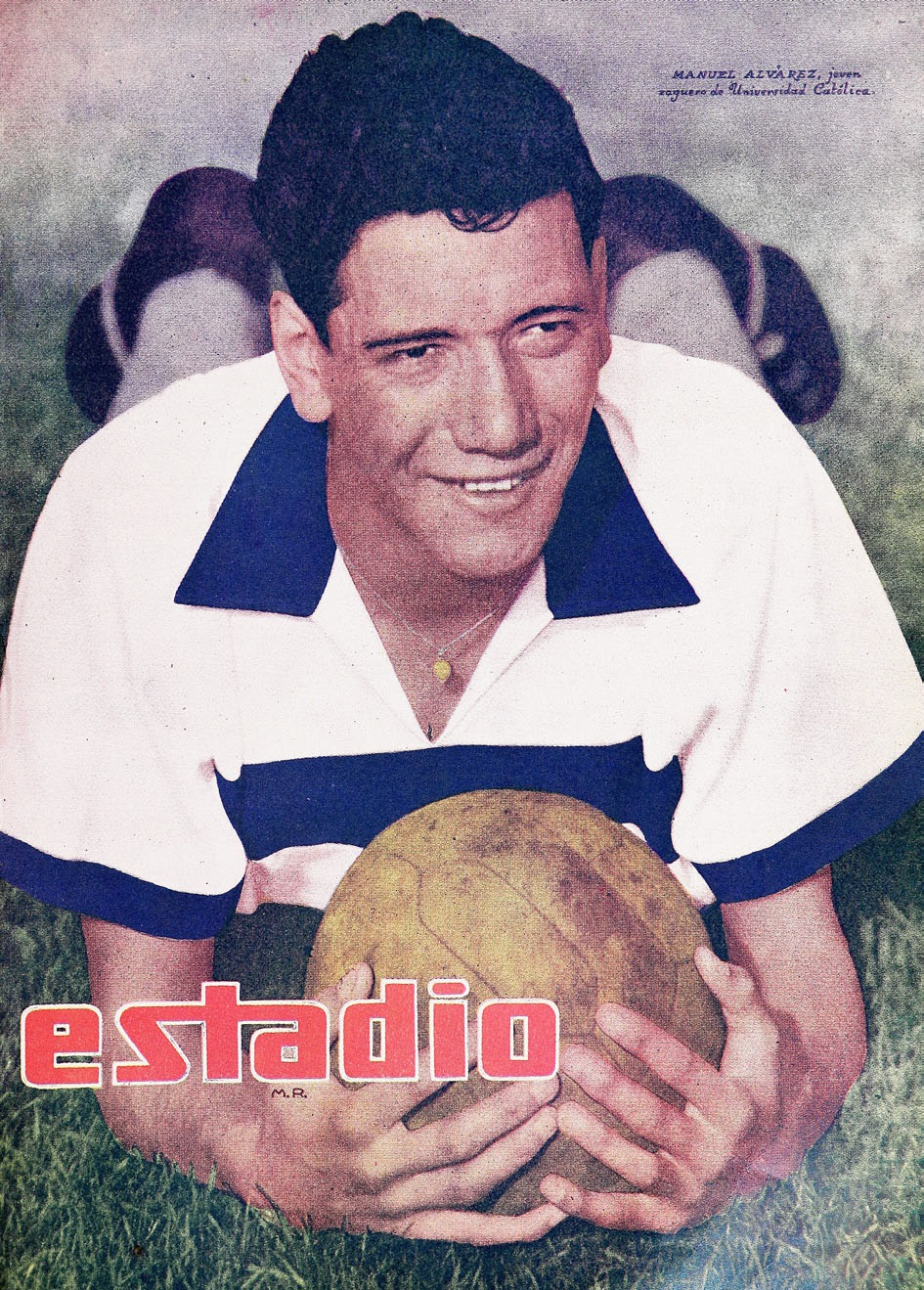

Personal information
- Full name: Manuel Hernán Álvarez Jiménez
- Date of birth: 23 May 1928
- Date of death: 24 August 1998 (aged 70)
- Position: Defender

Youth career
- 1943–1946: Universidad Católica

Senior career*
Years	Team	Apps	(Gls)
1946–1948	Universidad Católica		

International career
1947-1956	Chile	35	(0)
- * Club domestic league appearances and goals

Manuel Hernán Álvarez Jiménez (23 May 1928 – 24 August 1998) was a Chilean football defender who played for Chile in the 1950 FIFA World Cup. He also played for Universidad Católica.

== Legacy ==
Constituted on 23 November 1956, Álvarez was a leadership member of the Sindicato Profesional de Jugadores de Fútbol (Professional Trade Union of Football Players) in Chile.

== Record at FIFA tournaments ==
National team	Year	Apps	Goals
Chile	1950	3	0
Chile	1954	2	0
