= Mário Gardelli =

Brazilian football referee

Mário Gardelli (born 1908, date of death unknown) was a Brazilian football referee.

== Career ==
He officiated in the following major competitions:

- 1949 South American Championship (5 matches)
- 1950 FIFA World Cup (1 match)
