= 1958 FIFA World Cup Group 1 =

Football tournament group stage

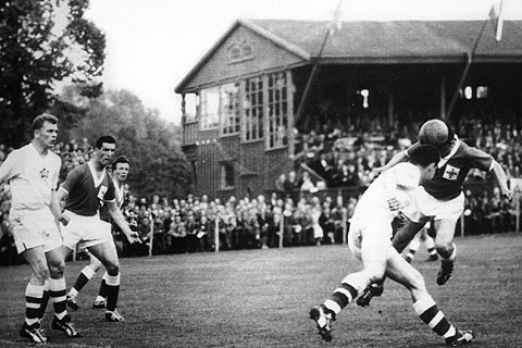
The match between Northern Ireland and Czechoslovakia on 8 June at Örjans Vall, Halmstad. Northern Ireland won 1–0, and these two sides would face each other again in a play-off nine days later, which was also won by Northern Ireland.

Group 1 of the 1958 FIFA World Cup took place from 8 to 17 June 1958. The group consisted of Argentina, Czechoslovakia, Northern Ireland, and West Germany.

== Standings ==
Pos	Team	Pld	W	D	L	GF	GA	GR	Pts	Qualification
1	West Germany	3	1	2	0	7	5	1.400	4	Advance to knockout stage
2	Northern Ireland	3	1	1	1	4	5	0.800	3 (Note: Northern Ireland finished ahead of Czechoslovakia by winning a play-off.)	Advance to knockout stage
3	Czechoslovakia	3	1	1	1	8	4	2.000	3	
4	Argentina	3	1	0	2	5	10	0.500	2	

Source: FIFA

== Matches ==
All times listed are local time.

=== Argentina vs West Germany ===
Argentina forgot to bring their change strip, and borrowed the yellow shirt of host team IFK Malmö.

8 June 1958
19:00 (CET)

Argentina	1–3	West Germany
Corbatta 3'		Rahn 32', 79'; Seeler 42'

Malmö Stadion, Malmö
Attendance: 31,156
Referee: Reginald Leafe (England)

Argentina
West Germany

GK	1	Amadeo Carrizo
DF	2	Pedro Dellacha (c)
DF	3	Federico Vairo
MF	4	Francisco Lombardo
MF	5	Néstor Rossi
MF	6	José Varacka
FW	7	Oreste Corbatta
FW	8	Eliseo Prado
FW	9	Norberto Menéndez
FW	10	Alfredo Rojas
FW	11	Osvaldo Cruz
Manager:
Guillermo Stábile

GK	1	Fritz Herkenrath
DF	2	Herbert Erhardt
DF	3	Erich Juskowiak
MF	7	Georg Stollenwerk
MF	4	Horst Eckel
MF	6	Horst Szymaniak
FW	10	Alfred Schmidt
FW	8	Helmut Rahn
FW	9	Fritz Walter
FW	11	Hans Schäfer (c)
FW	12	Uwe Seeler
Manager:
Sepp Herberger

=== Northern Ireland vs Czechoslovakia ===
8 June 1958
19:00 (CET)

Northern Ireland	1–0	Czechoslovakia
Cush 21'

Örjans Vall, Halmstad
Attendance: 10,647
Referee: Fritz Seipelt (Austria)

Northern Ireland
Czechoslovakia

GK	1	Harry Gregg
DF	5	Dick Keith
DF	3	Alf McMichael
DF	2	Willie Cunningham
MF	4	Danny Blanchflower (c)
MF	6	Bertie Peacock
FW	7	Billy Bingham
FW	8	Wilbur Cush
FW	16	Derek Dougan
FW	10	Jimmy McIlroy
FW	11	Peter McParland
Manager:
Peter Doherty

GK	19	Břetislav Dolejší
DF	2	Gustáv Mráz
DF	4	Ladislav Novák (c)
DF	6	Svatopluk Pluskal
MF	3	Jiří Čadek
MF	5	Josef Masopust
FW	13	Vaclav Hovorka
FW	8	Milan Dvořák
FW	10	Jaroslav Borovička
FW	15	Jan Hertl
FW	11	Tadeáš Kraus
Manager:
Karel Kolský

=== West Germany vs Czechoslovakia ===
11 June 1958
19:00 (CET)

West Germany	2–2	Czechoslovakia
Schäfer 60'; Rahn 71'		Dvořák 24' (pen.); Zikán 42'

Olympiastadion, Helsingborg
Attendance: 25,000
Referee: Arthur Edward Ellis (England)

West Germany
Czechoslovakia

GK	1	Fritz Herkenrath
DF	7	Georg Stollenwerk
DF	3	Erich Juskowiak
DF	17	Karl-Heinz Schnellinger
DF	2	Herbert Erhardt
MF	6	Horst Szymaniak
FW	8	Helmut Rahn
FW	9	Fritz Walter
FW	12	Uwe Seeler
FW	11	Hans Schäfer (c)
FW	13	Bernhard Klodt
Manager:
Sepp Herberger

GK	19	Břetislav Dolejší
DF	2	Gustáv Mráz
DF	4	Ladislav Novák (c)
DF	6	Svatopluk Pluskal
DF	16	Ján Popluhár
MF	5	Josef Masopust
FW	13	Vaclav Hovorka
FW	8	Milan Dvořák
FW	9	Pavol Molnár
FW	14	Jiří Feureisl
FW	12	Zdeněk Zikán
Manager:
Karel Kolský

=== Argentina vs Northern Ireland ===
11 June 1958
19:00 (CET)

Argentina	3–1	Northern Ireland
Corbatta 37' (pen.); Menéndez 56'; Avio 60'		McParland 4'

Örjans Vall, Halmstad
Attendance: 14,174
Referee: Sten Ahlner (Sweden)

Argentina
Northern Ireland

GK	1	Amadeo Carrizo
DF	2	Pedro Dellacha (c)
DF	3	Federico Vairo
MF	4	Francisco Lombardo
MF	5	Néstor Rossi
MF	6	José Varacka
FW	7	Oreste Corbatta
FW	9	Norberto Menéndez
FW	11	Ángel Labruna
FW	18	Norberto Boggio
FW	19	Ludovico Avio
Manager:
Guillermo Stábile

GK	1	Harry Gregg
DF	2	Willie Cunningham
DF	3	Alf McMichael
MF	5	Dick Keith
MF	6	Bertie Peacock
MF	4	Danny Blanchflower (c)
FW	10	Jimmy McIlroy
FW	7	Billy Bingham
FW	8	Wilbur Cush
FW	11	Peter McParland
FW	17	Fay Coyle
Manager:
Peter Doherty

=== West Germany vs Northern Ireland ===
15 June 1958
19:00 (CET)

West Germany	2–2	Northern Ireland
Rahn 20'; Seeler 78'		McParland 18', 60'

Malmö Stadion, Malmö
Attendance: 21,990
Referee: Joaquim Campos (Portugal)

West Germany
Northern Ireland

GK	1	Fritz Herkenrath
DF	7	Georg Stollenwerk
DF	3	Erich Juskowiak
DF	2	Herbert Erhardt
MF	4	Horst Eckel
MF	6	Horst Szymaniak
FW	8	Helmut Rahn
FW	9	Fritz Walter
FW	12	Uwe Seeler
FW	11	Hans Schäfer (c)
FW	13	Bernhard Klodt
Manager:
Sepp Herberger

GK	1	Harry Gregg
DF	5	Dick Keith
DF	3	Alf McMichael
DF	2	Willie Cunningham
MF	4	Danny Blanchflower (c)
MF	6	Bertie Peacock
FW	7	Billy Bingham
FW	8	Wilbur Cush
FW	13	Tommy Casey
FW	10	Jimmy McIlroy
FW	11	Peter McParland
Manager:
Peter Doherty

=== Czechoslovakia vs Argentina ===
15 June 1958
19:00 (CET)

Czechoslovakia	6–1	Argentina
Dvořák 8'; Zikán 17', 40'; Feureisl 69'; Hovorka 82', 89'		Corbatta 65' (pen.)

Olympiastadion, Helsingborg
Attendance: 16,418
Referee: Arthur Edward Ellis (England)

Czechoslovakia
Argentina

GK	19	Břetislav Dolejší
DF	2	Gustáv Mráz
DF	4	Ladislav Novák
MF	8	Milan Dvořák
MF	16	Ján Popluhár
MF	5	Josef Masopust
FW	13	Vaclav Hovorka
FW	10	Jaroslav Borovička
FW	14	Jiří Feureisl
FW	9	Pavol Molnár
FW	12	Zdeněk Zikán
Manager:
Karel Kolský

GK	1	Amadeo Carrizo
DF	2	Pedro Dellacha
DF	3	Federico Vairo
MF	4	Francisco Lombardo
MF	5	Néstor Rossi
MF	6	José Varacka
FW	7	Oreste Corbatta
FW	19	Ludovico Avio
FW	9	Norberto Menéndez
FW	11	Ángel Labruna
FW	22	Osvaldo Cruz
Manager:
Guillermo Stábile

=== Play-off: Northern Ireland vs Czechoslovakia ===
17 June 1958
19:00 (CET)

Northern Ireland	2–1 (a.e.t.)	Czechoslovakia
McParland 44', 99'		Zikán 19'

Malmö Stadion, Malmö
Attendance: 6,196
Referee: Maurice Guigue (France)

Northern Ireland
Czechoslovakia

GK	12	Norman Uprichard
DF	5	Dick Keith
DF	3	Alf McMichael
DF	2	Willie Cunningham
MF	4	Danny Blanchflower (c)
MF	6	Bertie Peacock
FW	7	Billy Bingham
FW	8	Wilbur Cush
FW	14	Jackie Scott
FW	10	Jimmy McIlroy
FW	11	Peter McParland
Manager:
Peter Doherty

GK	19	Břetislav Dolejší
DF	2	Gustáv Mráz
DF	4	Ladislav Novák (c)
DF	17	Titus Buberník	(red card) 102'
MF	16	Ján Popluhár
MF	5	Josef Masopust
FW	8	Milan Dvořák
FW	9	Pavol Molnár
FW	14	Jiří Feureisl
FW	10	Jaroslav Borovička
FW	12	Zdeněk Zikán
Manager:
Karel Kolský

== See also ==
- Argentina at the FIFA World Cup
- Czech Republic at the FIFA World Cup
- Germany at the FIFA World Cup
- Northern Ireland at the FIFA World Cup
- Slovakia at the FIFA World Cup
- Disaster of Sweden
