= Disaster of Sweden =

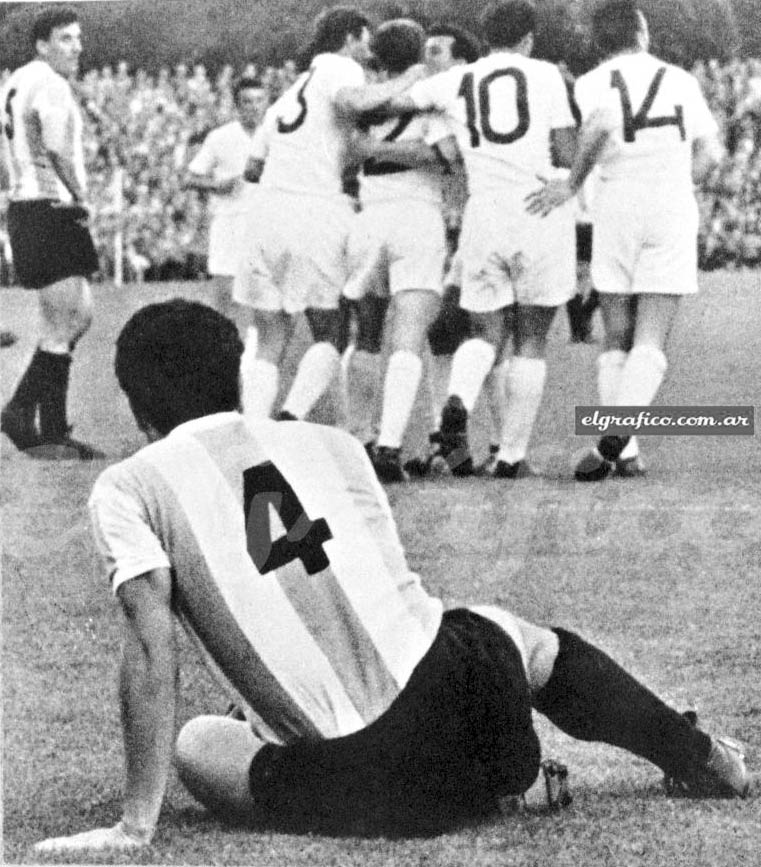
- Francisco Lombardo (4) on the pitch while Czechoslovakia players celebrate
- Event: 1958 FIFA World Cup, first round, group 1
Czechoslovakia	Argentina
(Czechoslovakia)	(Argentina)
6	1
- Date: 15 June 1958
- Venue: Olympiastadion, Helsingborg, Sweden
- Referee: Arthur Edward Ellis (England)
- Attendance: 16,418

The Disaster of Sweden (Spanish: Desastre de Suecia) is the name given to the early elimination of the Argentina football team from the 1958 FIFA World Cup at the hands of the Czechoslovakia football team. The match was played on 15 June 1958, at the Olympiastadion in the city of Helsingborg, Sweden, the host country of the championship. That day, Czechoslovakia beat Argentina 6–1. The final result means the heaviest defeat for the Albiceleste team in a FIFA World Cup.

It is also regarded as "the greatest frustration experienced by the Argentine national team at a FIFA World Cup"

== Background ==
The Argentine national team was once again competing in a World Cup after 24 years so they had been absent in the 1934, 1938, 1950, and 1954 World Cups. The onfidence that executives, coaches, players, and journalists had in that squad led by Guillermo Stábile was absolute.

Before that meeting, the two teams had only met once, on 16 August 1956, at El Gasómetro in Buenos Aires with a 1–0 victory for the locals.

Argentina arrived at the World Cup with the title of South American champion in tow, after the achievement obtained a year earlier in Peru. Many of the Argentinian football figures of that time, such as Amadeo Carrizo, Ángel Labruna (both members of River's La Maquina), Omar Corbatta, José Ramos Delgado (who later played alongside Pelé in Santos) and José Sanfilippo (historic goalscorer of San Lorenzo de Almagro) took place in the final squad that traveled to Sweden in search of the first world conquest of the Argentinian team and after 24 years of absence from the biggest event. With Guillermo Stábile as coach, the Argentinian team reached qualification after eliminating Bolivia and Chile.

Nevertheless, some of the key figures in the 1957 Sudamericano such as Omar Sívori, Antonio Angelillo, and Humberto Maschio (who had been transferred to Italian clubs after the tournament) were not called up by the Argentine Football Association for the World Cup so "they were not considered indispensable".

Czechoslovakia, for its part, had qualified in UEFA group 4 beating Wales and East Germany. As at that time there was still no official football championship between all the European teams (the UEFA Euro only began in 1960), the only rivals arose from the friendlies determined by FIFA, and from the Central European International Cup, a tournament which was played between the late '20s and '50s by the strongest teams in said continental region. The Czechoslovak team entered the World Cup with 7 consecutive matches without defeat, 2 of them friendlies, 3 in the qualifying round and 2 in the Central European Cup.

== The World Cup in Sweden ==
In 1958, both teams met in Group A of the World Cup with West Germany and Northern Ireland.

After the dispute of the first two matches, Argentina arrived with 2 points as a result of a defeat against West Germany by 3-1 and a victory against the British team by the same score. Czechoslovakia, on the other hand, had achieved a single point due to a draw against the Germans and a narrow defeat against Northern Ireland, so they had to win to achieve a qualification attempt.

Positions previous to the game

Team	Pld	W	D	L	GF	GA	GD	Pts
West Germany	2	1	1	0	5	3	+2	3
Argentina	2	1	0	1	4	4	0	2
Northern Ireland	2	1	0	1	2	3	–1	2
Czechoslovakia	2	0	1	1	2	3	–1	1

== Match ==
=== Summary ===
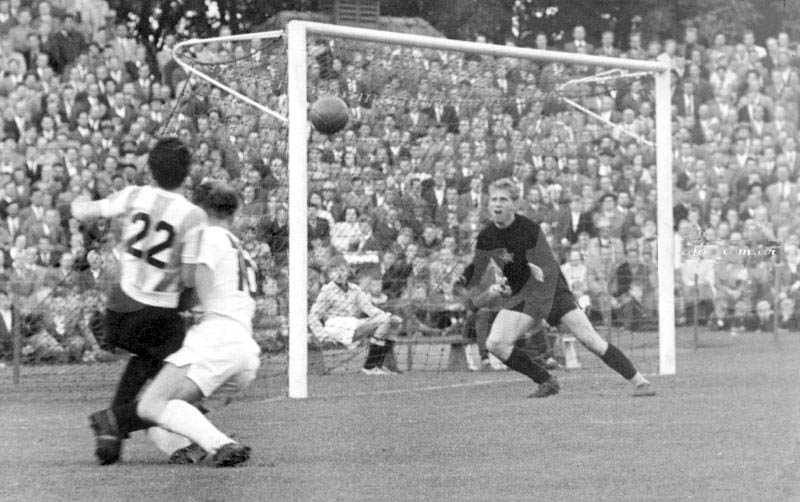
Argentina's left wing Osvaldo Cruz on the attack

The Europeans quickly took control of the match and in the 8th minute defender Milan Dvořák scored the first goal with a shot from outside the area. At 17' the Czechs scored through Zdeněk Zikán after a failed rejection by Francisco Lombardo. At the end of the first half, at 40', Zikán scored again.

Already in the second half the South Americans tried to close the gap. Thus, at 65' Orestes Omar Corbatta made it 1-3 through a penalty. However, four minutes later Jiří Feureisl scored the fourth goal. Then Václav Hovorka would score twice, at 82' and 89', making the final score 6 to 1.

=== Details ===
15 June 1958
19:00 (CET)

Czechoslovakia	6–1	Argentina
Dvořák 8'; Zikán 17', 40'; Feureisl 69'; Hovorka 82', 89'		Corbatta 65' (pen.)

Olympiastadion, Helsingborg
Attendance: 16,418
Referee: Arthur Edward Ellis (England)

Czechoslovakia
Argentina

GK	19	Břetislav Dolejší
DF	2	Gustáv Mráz
DF	4	Ladislav Novák
MF	8	Milan Dvořák
MF	16	Ján Popluhár
MF	5	Josef Masopust
FW	13	Vaclav Hovorka
FW	10	Jaroslav Borovička
FW	14	Jiří Feureisl
FW	9	Pavol Molnár
FW	12	Zdeněk Zikán
Manager:
Karel Kolský

GK	1	Amadeo Carrizo
DF	2	Pedro Dellacha
DF	3	Federico Vairo
MF	4	Francisco Lombardo
MF	5	Néstor Rossi
MF	6	José Varacka
FW	7	Oreste Corbatta
FW	19	Ludovico Avio
FW	9	Norberto Menéndez
FW	11	Ángel Labruna
FW	22	Osvaldo Cruz
Manager:
Guillermo Stábile

== Aftermath ==
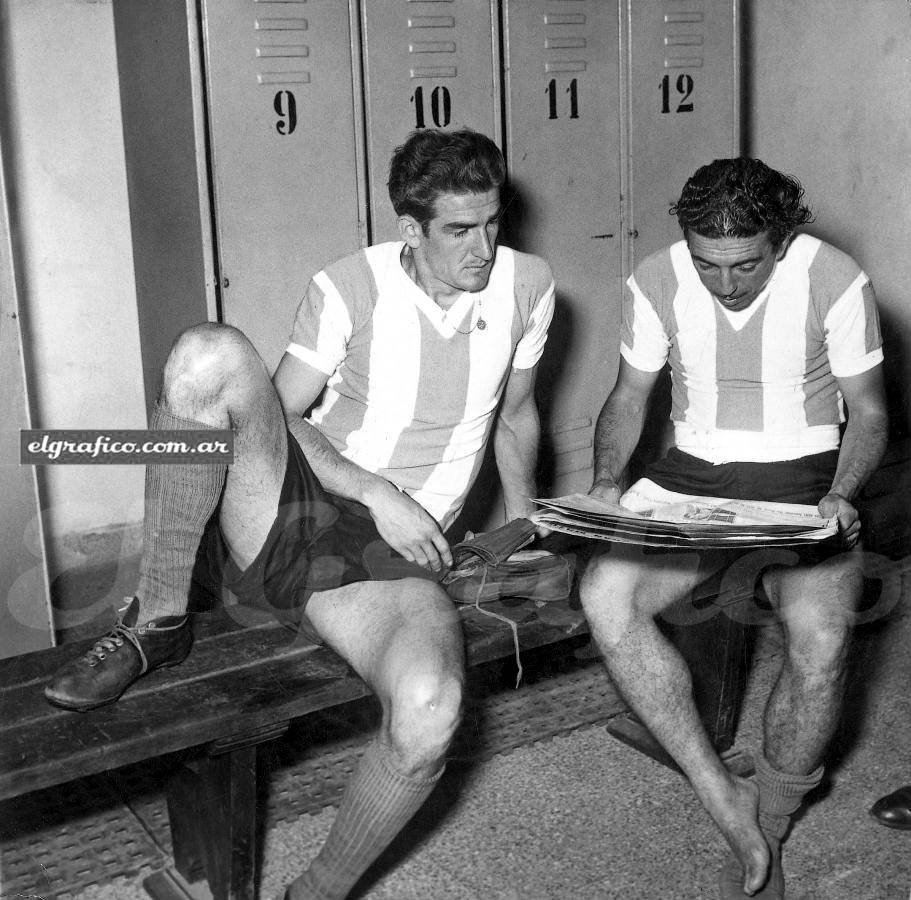
José Varacka and Ángel Labruna after the match

Argentine journalist Ricardo Lorenzo (aka) Borocotó, chronicled in El Gráfico: "The Argentine side is weak. This comes as no surprise. When they left Buenos Aires for Europe, they displayed this weakness against Germany, as well as in their matches leading up to the World Cup. Then, suddenly, that miracle against Ireland occurred—and since miracles do not repeat themselves, we are now convinced that, rather than an outstanding performance by the Argentine team, it was actually a poor, mediocre showing by the Irish. The results confirm this assessment". He also stated that "The match was effectively over by the end of the first half, not because of the 3–0 scoreline, but due to the disparity in tactical approach –both individual and collective– and the overwhelming capability of the Czechoslovaks, who needed no more than 45 minutes to dismantle the Argentine national side. When, in the history of our country’s football, has anything like this ever happened?".

The defeat, considered humiliating, brought immediate consequences and others that decisively influenced the subsequent development of Argentinian football.

The early elimination of the Argentinian team was echoed in the main graphic media of the time. Criticism began to fall on the president of the AFA, Raúl Colombo, and the coaching staff, while the team was received at the Ezeiza Airport with insults and throwing coins.

Guillermo Stábile resigned from the coach position after this episode, a position he had held since 1939 and in which he had achieved 6 South American Championship titles.

Ángel Labruna, forward of that team, later declared to the press:

We went blindfolded, blind. We were not physically or tactically prepared to face 3 games in one week.

Amadeo Carrizo, the Argentinian goalkeeper, resigned from his country's national team, to which he returned, however, in 1964 for the Nations Cup. He would later reveal the following:

When we arrived in the country, after the elimination, the plane had to land on a farm in Monte Grande so they wouldn't kill us. Some Argentinian journalists who were in Sweden had asked people to go look for us at the air station with sticks and stones. There was a lot of anger, they wanted to kill us, they said we were traitors. Nobody was going to believe us that Argentina lacked organization and that none of us charged a single peso to play in that World Cup.

Jose Sanfilippo, who did not play in that match, later stated:

We didn't even know what color our opponents' jerseys were, let alone how they played. It was a total mess, with lots of fights between the players and the coach. (...) It was a world of difference. They'd send a 40- or 50-meter pass right to a teammate's chest—it was a whole different level of speed; we looked like turtles. We learned a ton at that World Cup, because all we knew was to dribble.

== See also ==
- Argentina at the FIFA World Cup
- Czech Republic at the FIFA World Cup
- Slovakia at the FIFA World Cup
