= Czech Republic at the FIFA World Cup =

International football delegation

This is a record of the Czech Republic's results at the FIFA World Cup, including those of Czechoslovakia which is considered as both theirs and Slovakia's predecessor by FIFA. The FIFA World Cup is an international association football competition contested by the men's national teams of the members of Fédération Internationale de Football Association (FIFA), the sport's global governing body. The championship has been awarded every four years since the first tournament in 1930, except in 1942 and 1946, due to World War II.

The tournament consists of two parts, the qualification phase and the final phase (officially called the World Cup Finals). The qualification phase, which currently takes place over the three years preceding the Finals, is used to determine which teams qualify for the Finals. The current format of the Finals involves 48 teams competing for the title, at venues within the host nation (or nations) over a period of about a month. The World Cup final is the most widely viewed sporting event in the world, with an estimated 715.1 million people watching the 2006 tournament final.

Czechoslovakia has been one of the better performing national teams in the history of the World Cup, having ended twice as runners-up, in 1934 and in 1962. Between 1930 and 1994 they qualified for 8 out of 13 World Cups they played qualifiers for, and did not enter in two other World Cups.

After the political and peaceful split-up into the Czech Republic and Slovakia, the official successor football teams of Czech Republic and Slovakia have been less successful at the World Cup than Czechoslovakia, qualifying only for one out of the seven tournaments held since (the 2006 FIFA World Cup and 2010 FIFA World Cup) without surviving the group phase and got eliminated in the last 16 respectively.

Throughout World Cup history, Brazil became the team's historical rival. The two countries have met each other five times but the Czechs and Slovaks (always Czechoslovakia) never won, with three victories for the Brazilian side and two draws. Two other historical opponents in the finals were (West) Germany and Italy with three encounters each: Czechoslovakia won, drew and lost once against the Germans and the matches against Italy all ended in a defeat.

== Record at the FIFA World Cup ==
=== Overall record ===
In their first World Cup participation in 1934, Czechoslovakia (white) reached the final where they lost the title to Italy (blue)

Czechoslovakia (white) and Brazil (yellow) teams for the 1962 FIFA World Cup final

Year	Round	Position	Pld	W	D*	L	GF	GA
as Czechoslovakia
(Uruguay) 1930	Did not enter							
(Italy) 1934	Runners-up	2nd	4	3	0	1	9	6
(France) 1938	Quarter-finals	5th	3	1	1	1	5	3
(Brazil) 1950	Did not qualify							
(Switzerland) 1954	Group stage	14th	2	0	0	2	0	7
(Sweden) 1958	Group stage	9th	4	1	1	2	9	6
(Chile) 1962	Runners-up	2nd	6	3	1	2	7	7
(England) 1966	Did not qualify							
(Mexico) 1970	Group stage	15th	3	0	0	3	2	7
(West Germany) 1974	Did not qualify							
(Argentina) 1978	Did not qualify							
(Spain) 1982	Group stage	19th	3	0	2	1	2	4
(Mexico) 1986	Did not qualify							
(Italy) 1990	Quarter-finals	6th	5	3	0	2	10	5
(United States) 1994	Did not qualify							
as Czech Republic
(France) 1998	Did not qualify							
(South Korea) (Japan) 2002	Did not qualify							
(Germany) 2006	Group stage	20th	3	1	0	2	3	4
(South Africa) 2010	Did not qualify							
(Brazil) 2014	Did not qualify							
(Russia) 2018	Did not qualify							
(Qatar) 2022	Did not qualify							
as Czechia
(Canada) (Mexico) (United States) 2026	Group stage	39th	3	0	1	2	2	6
(Morocco) (Portugal) (Spain) 2030	To be determined							
(Saudi Arabia) 2034	To be determined							
Total	10/23	-	36	12	6	18	49	55

*Draws include knockout matches decided via penalty shoot-out

Czech Republic's World Cup record
First Match	Czechoslovakia 2–1 Romania (27 May 1934; Trieste, Italy)
Biggest Win	Czechoslovakia 6–1 Argentina (15 June 1958; Helsingborg, Sweden)
Biggest Defeat	Austria 5–0 Czechoslovakia (19 June 1954; Zürich, Switzerland)
Best Result	Runners-up in 1934 and 1962
Worst Result	Group stage in 1954, 1958, 1970, 1982, 2006 and 2026

=== By match ===
World Cup	Round	Opponent	Score	Result	Venue	Czech scorers
1934	Round of 16	Romania	2–1	W	Trieste	A. Puč, O. Nejedlý
1934	Quarter-finals	Switzerland	3–2	W	Turin	F. Svoboda, J. Sobotka, O. Nejedlý
1934	Semi-finals	Germany	3–1	W	Rome	O. Nejedlý (3)
1934	Final	Italy	1–2 (a.e.t.)	L	Rome	A. Puč
1938	Round of 16	Netherlands	3–0 (a.e.t.)	W	Le Havre	J. Košťálek, J. Zeman, O. Nejedlý
1938	Quarter-finals	Brazil	1–1 (a.e.t.)	D	Bordeaux	O. Nejedlý
1938	Quarter-finals	Brazil	1–2	L	Bordeaux	V. Kopecký
1954	Group stage	Uruguay	0–2	L	Bern	—
1954	Group stage	Austria	0–5	L	Zürich	—
1958	Group stage	Northern Ireland	0–1	L	Halmstad	—
1958	Group stage	West Germany	2–2	D	Helsingborg	M. Dvořák, Z. Zikán
1958	Group stage	Argentina	6–1	W	Helsingborg	Z. Zikán (2), V. Hovorka (2), M. Dvořák, J. Feureisl
1958	Group stage	Northern Ireland	1–2 (a.e.t.)	L	Malmö	Z. Zikán
1962	Group stage	Spain	1–0	W	Viña del Mar	J. Štibrányi
1962	Group stage	Brazil	0–0	D	Viña del Mar	—
1962	Group stage	Mexico	1–3	L	Viña del Mar	V. Mašek
1962	Quarter-finals	Hungary	1–0	W	Rancagua	A. Scherer
1962	Semi-finals	Yugoslavia	3–1	W	Viña del Mar	A. Scherer (2), J. Kadraba
1962	Final	Brazil	1–3	L	Santiago	J. Masopust
1970	Group stage	Brazil	1–4	L	Guadalajara	L. Petráš
1970	Group stage	Romania	1–2	L	Guadalajara	L. Petráš
1970	Group stage	England	0–1	L	Guadalajara	—
1982	Group stage	Kuwait	1–1	D	Valladolid	A. Panenka
1982	Group stage	England	0–2	L	Bilbao	—
1982	Group stage	France	1–1	D	Valladolid	A. Panenka
1990	Group stage	United States	5–1	W	Florence	T. Skuhravý (2), M. Bílek, I. Hašek, M. Luhový
1990	Group stage	Austria	1–0	W	Florence	M. Bílek
1990	Group stage	Italy	0–2	L	Rome	—
1990	Round of 16	Costa Rica	4–1	W	Bari	T. Skuhravý (3), L. Kubík
1990	Quarter-finals	West Germany	0–1	L	Milan	—
2006	Group stage	United States	3–0	W	Gelsenkirchen	T. Rosický (2), J. Koller
2006	Group stage	Ghana	0–2	L	Cologne	—
2006	Group stage	Italy	0–2	L	Hamburg	—
2026	Group stage	South Korea	1–2	L	Zapopan	L. Krejčí
2026	Group stage	South Africa	1–1	D	Atlanta	M. Sadílek
2026	Group stage	Mexico	0–3	L	Mexico City	—

=== Record by opponent ===
FIFA World Cup matches (by team)
Opponent	Wins	Draws	Losses	Total	Goals for	Goals against
Argentina	1	0	0	1	6	1
Austria	1	0	1	2	1	5
Brazil	0	2	3	5	4	10
Costa Rica	1	0	0	1	4	1
England	0	0	2	2	0	3
France	0	1	0	1	1	1
Germany	1	1	1	3	5	4
Ghana	0	0	1	1	0	2
Hungary	1	0	0	1	1	0
Italy	0	0	3	3	1	6
Kuwait	0	1	0	1	1	1
Mexico	0	0	2	2	1	6
Netherlands	1	0	0	1	3	0
Northern Ireland	0	0	2	2	1	3
Romania	1	0	1	2	3	3
Serbia	1	0	0	1	3	1
South Africa	0	1	0	0	1	1
South Korea	0	0	1	1	1	2
Spain	1	0	0	1	1	0
Switzerland	1	0	0	1	3	2
United States	2	0	0	2	8	1
Uruguay	0	0	1	1	0	2

== Player records ==
=== Most appearances ===
Rank	Player	Matches	World Cups
1	Ladislav Novák	12	1954, 1958 and 1962
2	Josef Masopust	10	1958 and 1962
3	Svatopluk Pluskal	9	1954, 1958 and 1962
3	Ján Popluhár	9	1958 and 1962
5	Andrej Kvašňák	8	1962 and 1970
6	Josef Košťálek	7	1934 and 1938
7	Oldřich Nejedlý	6	1934 and 1938
7	František Plánička	6	1934 and 1938
7	Adolf Scherer	6	1962
7	Viliam Schrojf	6	1962
7	Jozef Adamec	6	1962 and 1970

=== Top goalscorers ===
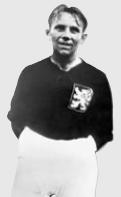
Oldřich Nejedlý was Czechoslovakia/ Czech Republic's all-time top scorer at the World Cup.

Rank	Player	Goals	World Cups
1	Oldřich Nejedlý	7	1934 (5) and 1938 (2)
2	Tomáš Skuhravý	5	1990
3	Zdeněk Zikán	3	1958
3	Adolf Scherer	3	1962
5	Antonín Puč	2	1934
5	Milan Dvořák	2	1958
5	Václav Hovorka	2	1958
5	Ladislav Petráš	2	1970
5	Antonín Panenka	2	1982
5	Michal Bílek	2	1990
5	Tomáš Rosický	2	2006

== Awards ==
Team awards

- Runners-up: 1934, 1962

Individual awards

- Silver Ball (unofficial): Josef Masopust (1962)
- Bronze Ball (unofficial): Oldřich Nejedlý (1934)
- Golden Boot: Oldřich Nejedlý (1934)
- Silver Boot: Tomáš Skuhravý (1990)
- Golden Glove (unofficial): František Plánička (1938), Viliam Schrojf (1962)

== See also ==
- Czech Republic at the UEFA European Championship
