= Northern Ireland at the FIFA World Cup =

International football delegation

The Northern Ireland national football team have appeared in the FIFA World Cup on three occasions.

Their best World Cup performance was in their first appearance in the finals, the 1958 World Cup, where they reached the quarter-finals after beating Czechoslovakia 2–1 in the play-off. They were knocked out by France, losing 4–0. In the 1958 competition Northern Ireland became the least populous country to have qualified for the World Cup, a record that stood until Trinidad & Tobago qualified for the 2006 World Cup. Northern Ireland remains, however, the least populous country to have qualified for more than one World Cup finals tournament, to win a World Cup finals match, to have scored at a World Cup finals, and to have progressed from the first round of the World Cup finals.

Captain of the national side at the 1958 World Cup was Danny Blanchflower, who also captained Tottenham Hotspur in the English league and was twice footballer of the year in England. His younger brother Jackie was also a key member of the national team, and won two league titles in England with Manchester United, until his career was ended by injuries suffered in the Munich air disaster of February 1958.

Despite the presence of world class forward George Best, another Manchester United player, for most of the 1960s and into the 1970s, Northern Ireland failed to qualify for any major tournaments during this time.

Northern Ireland also qualified for the 1982 World Cup. Their opening game was against Yugoslavia at La Romareda in Zaragoza. It was the international debut of 17-year-old Norman Whiteside who became the youngest player ever in the World Cup finals, a record that still stands. The game finished goalless. Five days later they drew 1–1 with Honduras, which was a disappointment, and many believed had doomed Northern Ireland's chances of advancing in the competition. They needed a win against hosts Spain in the third and final group game at the Mestalla Stadium in Valencia. They faced a partisan atmosphere with a mostly Spanish crowd and a Spanish speaking referee in Héctor Ortiz who was unwilling to punish dirty play from the Spanish players. However a mistake from goalkeeper Luis Arconada gifted Gerry Armstrong the only goal of the game, and despite having Mal Donaghy sent off on 60 minutes, Northern Ireland went on to record a historic 1–0 win and top the first stage group.

A 2–2 draw with Austria at the Vicente Calderón Stadium meant that a win against France would take them into the semi-finals, however a French team inspired by Michel Platini won 4–1 and eliminated Northern Ireland from the competition.

In the 1986 World Cup, they reached the first round. Billy Bingham, a member of the 1958 squad, was manager for both of these tournaments.

== Record at the FIFA World Cup ==
FIFA World Cup record
Year	Round	Position	Pld	W	D*	L	GF	GA
(Uruguay) 1930	Did not enter							
(Italy) 1934	Did not enter							
(France) 1938	Did not enter							
(Brazil) 1950	Did not qualify							
(Switzerland) 1954	Did not qualify							
(Sweden) 1958	Quarter-finals	8th	5	2	1	2	6	10
(Chile) 1962	Did not qualify							
(England) 1966	Did not qualify							
(Mexico) 1970	Did not qualify							
(West Germany) 1974	Did not qualify							
(Argentina) 1978	Did not qualify							
(Spain) 1982	Second round	9th	5	1	3	1	5	7
(Mexico) 1986	Group stage	21st	3	0	1	2	2	6
(Italy) 1990	Did not qualify							
(United States) 1994	Did not qualify							
(France) 1998	Did not qualify							
(South Korea) (Japan) 2002	Did not qualify							
(Germany) 2006	Did not qualify							
(South Africa) 2010	Did not qualify							
(Brazil) 2014	Did not qualify							
(Russia) 2018	Did not qualify							
(Qatar) 2022	Did not qualify							
(Canada) (Mexico) (United States) 2026	Did not qualify							
(Morocco) (Portugal) (Spain) 2030	To be determined							
(Saudi Arabia) 2034	To be determined							
Total	Quarter-finals	3/23	13	3	5	5	13	23

*Denotes draws including knockout matches decided via penalty shoot-out.

=== By match ===
World Cup	Round	Opponent	Score	Result	Venue	Northern Ireland scorers
1958	Group stage	Czechoslovakia	1–0	W	Halmstad	W. Cush
1958	Group stage	Argentina	1–3	L	Halmstad	P. McParland
1958	Group stage	West Germany	2–2	D	Malmö	P. McParland (2)
1958	Group stage	Czechoslovakia	2–1 (a.e.t.)	W	Malmö	P. McParland (2)
1958	Quarter-finals	France	0–4	L	Norrköping	—
1982	Group stage	Yugoslavia	0–0	D	Zaragoza	—
1982	Group stage	Honduras	1–1	D	Zaragoza	G. Armstrong
1982	Group stage	Spain	1–0	W	Valencia	G. Armstrong
1982	Second round	Austria	2–2	D	Madrid	B. Hamilton (2)
1982	Second round	France	1–4	L	Madrid	G. Armstrong
1986	Group stage	Algeria	1–1	D	Guadalajara	N. Whiteside
1986	Group stage	Spain	1–2	L	Guadalajara	C. Clarke
1986	Group stage	Brazil	0–3	L	Guadalajara	—

=== Record by opponent ===
FIFA World Cup matches (by team)
Opponent	Wins	Draws	Losses	Total	Goals Scored	Goals Conceded
Algeria	0	1	0	1	1	1
Argentina	0	0	1	1	1	3
Austria	0	1	0	1	2	2
Brazil	0	0	1	1	0	3
Czechoslovakia	2	0	0	2	3	1
France	0	0	2	2	1	8
Honduras	0	1	0	1	1	1
Spain	1	0	1	2	2	2
West Germany	0	1	0	1	2	2
Yugoslavia	0	1	0	1	0	0

== Northern Ireland at Sweden 1958 ==
=== First round ===
==== Group 1 ====
Team	Pld	W	D	L	GF	GA	GAv	Pts
West Germany	3	1	2	0	7	5	1.40	4
Northern Ireland	3	1	1	1	4	5	0.80	3
Czechoslovakia	3	1	1	1	8	4	2.00	3
Argentina	3	1	0	2	5	10	0.50	2

8 June 1958
19:00 CET

Northern Ireland	1 – 0	Czechoslovakia
Cush 21'	Report

Örjans Vall, Halmstad
Attendance: 10,647
Referee: Seipelt (Austria)

11 June 1958
19:00 CET

Argentina	3 – 1	Northern Ireland
Corbatta 37' (pen.); Menéndez 56'; Avio 60'	Report	McParland 4'

Örjans Vall, Halmstad
Attendance: 14,174
Referee: Ahlner (Sweden)

15 June 1958
19:00 CET

West Germany	2 – 2	Northern Ireland
Rahn 20'; Seeler 78'	Report	McParland 18', 60'

Malmö Stadion, Malmö
Attendance: 21,990
Referee: Campos (Portugal)

===== Play-off =====
17 June 1958
19:00 (CET)

Northern Ireland	2–1 (a.e.t.)	Czechoslovakia
McParland 44', 97'	Report	Zikán 18'

Malmö Stadion, Malmö
Attendance: 6,196
Referee: Guigue (France)

==== Quarter-final 1958 World Cup ====
19 June 1958
19:00 CET

France	4 – 0	Northern Ireland
Wisnieski 22'; Fontaine 55', 63'; Piantoni 68'	Report

Idrottsparken, Norrköping
Attendance: 12,000
Referee: Gardeazabal (Spain)

== Northern Ireland at 1982 World Cup ==
=== Squad ===
Head coach: Billy Bingham

No.	Pos.	Player	Date of birth (age)	Caps	Club
1	GK	Pat Jennings	12 June 1945 (aged 37)		(England) Arsenal
2	DF	Jimmy Nicholl	28 February 1956 (aged 26)		(Canada) Toronto Blizzard
3	DF	Mal Donaghy	13 September 1957 (aged 24)		(England) Luton Town
4	MF	David McCreery	16 September 1957 (aged 24)		(United States) Tulsa Roughnecks
5	DF	Chris Nicholl	12 October 1946 (aged 35)		(England) Southampton
6	DF	John O'Neill	11 March 1958 (aged 24)		(England) Leicester City
7	MF	Noel Brotherston	18 November 1956 (aged 25)		(England) Blackburn Rovers
8	MF	Martin O'Neill (c)	1 March 1952 (aged 30)		(England) Norwich City
9	FW	Gerry Armstrong	23 May 1954 (aged 28)		(England) Watford
10	MF	Sammy McIlroy	2 August 1954 (aged 27)		(England) Stoke City
11	FW	Billy Hamilton	9 May 1957 (aged 25)		(England) Burnley
12	DF	John McClelland	7 December 1955 (aged 26)		(Scotland) Rangers
13	DF	Sammy Nelson	1 April 1949 (aged 33)		(England) Brighton
14	MF	Tommy Cassidy	18 November 1950 (aged 31)		(England) Burnley
15	MF	Tommy Finney	6 November 1952 (aged 29)		(England) Cambridge United
16	MF	Norman Whiteside	7 May 1965 (aged 17)		(England) Manchester United
17	GK	Jim Platt	26 January 1952 (aged 30)		(England) Middlesbrough
18	MF	Johnny Jameson	11 March 1958 (aged 24)		(Northern Ireland) Glentoran
19	FW	Felix Healy	27 September 1955 (aged 26)		(Northern Ireland) Coleraine
20	MF	Jim Cleary	27 May 1956 (aged 26)		(Northern Ireland) Glentoran
21	FW	Bobby Campbell	13 September 1956 (aged 25)		(England) Bradford City
22	GK	George Dunlop	16 January 1956 (aged 26)		(Northern Ireland) Linfield

=== Matches ===
17 June 1982
21:00 CEST

Yugoslavia	0–0	Northern Ireland
	Report

La Romareda, Zaragoza
Attendance: 25,000
Referee: Erik Fredriksson (Sweden)

21 June 1982
21:00 CEST

Honduras	1–1	Northern Ireland
Laing 60'	Report	Armstrong 10'

La Romareda, Zaragoza
Attendance: 15,000
Referee: Chan Tam Sun (Hong Kong)

25 June 1982
21:00 CEST

Spain	0–1	Northern Ireland
	Report	Armstrong 47'

Estadio Luis Casanova, Valencia
Attendance: 49,562
Referee: Héctor Ortiz (Paraguay)

1 July 1982 (second round)
17:15 CEST

Austria	2–2	Northern Ireland
Pezzey 50'; Hintermaier 68'	Report	Hamilton 27', 75'

Estadio Vicente Calderón, Madrid
Attendance: 20,000
Referee: Adolf Prokop (East Germany)

4 July 1982 (second round)
17:15 CEST

Northern Ireland	1–4	France
Armstrong 75'	Report	Giresse 33', 80'; Rocheteau 46', 68'

Estadio Vicente Calderón, Madrid
Attendance: 37,000
Referee: Alojzy Jarguz (Poland)

== Northern Ireland at 1986 World Cup ==
=== Squad ===
Head coach: Billy Bingham

No.	Pos.	Player	Date of birth (age)	Caps	Club
1	GK	Pat Jennings	12 June 1945 (aged 40)		(England) Tottenham Hotspur
2	DF	Jimmy Nicholl	28 December 1956 (aged 29)		(England) West Bromwich Albion
3	DF	Mal Donaghy	13 September 1957 (aged 28)		(England) Luton Town
4	DF	John O'Neill	11 March 1958 (aged 28)		(England) Leicester City
5	DF	Alan McDonald	12 October 1963 (aged 22)		(England) Queens Park Rangers
6	MF	David McCreery	16 September 1957 (aged 28)		(England) Newcastle United
7	MF	Steve Penney	16 January 1964 (aged 22)		(England) Brighton
8	MF	Sammy McIlroy (c)	2 August 1954 (aged 31)		(England) Manchester City
9	FW	Jimmy Quinn	18 November 1959 (aged 26)		(England) Blackburn Rovers
10	MF	Norman Whiteside	7 May 1965 (aged 21)		(England) Manchester United
11	FW	Ian Stewart	10 September 1961 (aged 24)		(England) Newcastle United
12	GK	Jim Platt	26 January 1952 (aged 34)		(Northern Ireland) Coleraine
13	GK	Philip Hughes	19 November 1964 (aged 21)		(England) Bury
14	FW	Gerry Armstrong	23 May 1954 (aged 32)		(England) Tottenham Hotspur
15	MF	Nigel Worthington	4 November 1961 (aged 24)		(England) Sheffield Wednesday
16	MF	Paul Ramsey	3 September 1962 (aged 23)		(England) Leicester City
17	FW	Colin Clarke	30 October 1962 (aged 23)		(England) Bournemouth
18	DF	John McClelland	7 December 1955 (aged 30)		(England) Watford
19	FW	Billy Hamilton	9 May 1957 (aged 29)		(England) Oxford United
20	DF	Bernard McNally	17 February 1963 (aged 23)		(England) Shrewsbury Town
21	MF	David Campbell	2 June 1965 (aged 20)		(England) Nottingham Forest
22	FW	Mark Caughey	31 August 1960 (aged 25)		(Northern Ireland) Linfield

=== Matches ===
3 June 1986
12:00 CST

Algeria	1 – 1	Northern Ireland
Zidane 59'	Report	Whiteside 6'

Estadio Tres de Marzo, Guadalajara
Attendance: 22,000
Referee: Valeri Butenko (Soviet Union)

7 June 1986
12:00 CST

Northern Ireland	1 – 2	Spain
Clarke 46'	Report	Butragueño 1'; Salinas 18'

Estadio Tres de Marzo, Guadalajara
Attendance: 28,000
Referee: Horst Brummeier (Austria)

12 June 1986
12:00 CST

Northern Ireland	0 – 3	Brazil
	Report	Careca 15', 87'; Josimar 42'

Estadio Jalisco, Guadalajara
Attendance: 51,000
Referee: Siegfried Kirschen (East Germany)

== Record players ==
One of Northern Ireland's record World Cup players, Norman Whiteside, also holds the record for the youngest player ever to appear in the tournament. When he was fielded against Yugoslavia, he was only 17 years and 41 days old.

Rank	Player	Matches	World Cups
1	Billy Hamilton	8	1982 and 1986
1	David McCreery	8	1982 and 1986
1	Sammy McIlroy	8	1982 and 1986
1	Jimmy Nicholl	8	1982 and 1986
1	Norman Whiteside	8	1982 and 1986
6	Mal Donaghy	7	1982 and 1986
6	Pat Jennings	7	1982 and 1986
8	Gerry Armstrong	6	1982 and 1986
9	Eleven players	5	

== Top goalscorers ==
Rank	Player	Goals	World Cups
1	Peter McParland	5	1958
2	Gerry Armstrong	3	1982
3	Billy Hamilton	2	1982
4	Wilbur Cush	1	1958
4	Colin Clarke	1	1986
4	Norman Whiteside	1	1986

== See also ==
- Northern Ireland at the UEFA European Championship
