= Georg Stollenwerk =

German footballer (1930–2014)

Personal information
- Date of birth: 19 December 1930
- Place of birth: Düren, Germany
- Date of death: 30 April 2014 (aged 83)
- Place of death: Cologne, Germany
- Positions: Defender; midfielder

Senior career*
Years	Team	Apps	(Gls)
1950–1953	SG Düren 99		
1953–1966	1. FC Köln		

International career
1951–1960	West Germany	23	(2)

Managerial career
- 1969: Alemannia Aachen
- 1975–1976: 1. FC Köln
- * Club domestic league appearances and goals

Georg Stollenwerk (19 December 1930 – 30 April 2014) was a German footballer and trainer.

His career started with SD Düren 99. From 1953 to 1966 he played for 1. FC Köln as defender and midfielder. The member of the German 1958 FIFA World Cup squad won 23 caps and scored two goals. He also represented Germany at the 1952 Summer Olympics.

== Career ==
Stollenwerk began his international career in 1951 playing as an inside right linkman. He proved to be a versatile player, being used in every position, including goalkeeper. During the 1958 FIFA World Cup, Stollenwerk was chosen to replace Fritz Herkenrath in the goal in case he got injured (with no substitutions being allowed). His main position, however, was that of an inside forward. This changed in 1957, when 1. FC Köln coach Hennes Weisweiler converted Stollenwerk to right back. This proved to be a good career move for him, as he felt at home in that role immediately and played convincingly enough to be called up again for international duty by Sepp Herberger. Previously, as an inside forward, he was only sporadically used by Herberger; however, at the right back position Herberger was looking for a fitting successor to Jupp Posipal, who had quit his international career in 1956. By 1958, Stollenwerk had become the standard right back of West Germany, allowing Herbert Erhardt to play as centre half instead of full back. Stollenwerk played in every German game at the 1958 FIFA World Cup and won 23 caps in total.

Stollenwerk retired from football in 1962, after winning the German football championship with 1. FC Köln. Later on he was a trainer for Alemannia Aachen, TuS Langerwehe and 1. FC Köln.
