= Czechoslovakia at the FIFA World Cup =

As UEFA and FIFA have recognized both the Czech Republic and Slovakia as joint and equal successors to Czechoslovakia, the following links are used:

- Czech Republic at the FIFA World Cup
- Slovakia at the FIFA World Cup
