= Northern Ireland at the UEFA European Championship =

International football delegation

Northern Ireland have only qualified once for a UEFA European Championship, the 2016 edition. They directly qualified as group winners, and were already secured of qualification after the penultimate matchday. For the draw of the end stage that took place on 12 December 2015, they were seeded in Pot 4.

== Euro 2016 ==
=== Group stage ===
Pos	Team	Pld	W	D	L	GF	GA	GD	Pts	Qualification
1	Germany	3	2	1	0	3	0	+3	7 (Note: Tied on head-to-head result (Germany 0–0 Poland). Overall goal difference was used as the tiebreaker.)	Advance to knockout stage
2	Poland	3	2	1	0	2	0	+2	7	Advance to knockout stage
3	Northern Ireland	3	1	0	2	2	2	0	3	Advance to knockout stage
4	Ukraine	3	0	0	3	0	5	−5	0	

Source: UEFA
Rules for classification: Group stage tiebreakers
Notes:
12 June 2016
18:00

Poland	1–0	Northern Ireland
Milik 51'	Report

Stade de Nice, Nice
Attendance: 33,742
Referee: Ovidiu Hațegan (Romania)

16 June 2016
18:00

Ukraine	0–2	Northern Ireland
	Report	McAuley 49'; McGinn 90+6'

Parc Olympique Lyonnais, Décines-Charpieu
Attendance: 51,043
Referee: Pavel Královec (Czech Republic)

21 June 2016
18:00

Northern Ireland	0–1	Germany
	Report	Gómez 30'

Parc des Princes, Paris
Attendance: 44,125
Referee: Clément Turpin (France)

Ranking of third-placed teams

Pos	Grp	Team	Pld	W	D	L	GF	GA	GD	Pts	Qualification
1	B	Slovakia	3	1	1	1	3	3	0	4	Advance to knockout stage
2	E	Republic of Ireland	3	1	1	1	2	4	−2	4	Advance to knockout stage
3	F	Portugal	3	0	3	0	4	4	0	3	Advance to knockout stage
4	C	Northern Ireland	3	1	0	2	2	2	0	3	Advance to knockout stage
5	D	Turkey	3	1	0	2	2	4	−2	3	
6	A	Albania	3	1	0	2	1	3	−2	3	

Source: UEFA
Rules for classification: 1) Higher number of points obtained; 2) Superior goal difference; 3) Higher number of goals scored; 4) Fair play conduct; 5) Position in the UEFA national team coefficient ranking system.

=== Knockout stage ===
Round of 16

25 June 2016
18:00

Wales	1–0	Northern Ireland
McAuley 75' (o.g.)	Report

Parc des Princes, Paris
Attendance: 44,342
Referee: Martin Atkinson (England)

== Overall record ==
UEFA European Championship record									Qualification record					
Year	Round	Position	Pld	W	D*	L	GF	GA	Pld	W	D	L	GF	GA
(France) 1960	Did not enter								Did not enter					
(Spain) 1964	Did not qualify								4	2	1	1	5	2
(Italy) 1968	Did not qualify								6	1	1	4	2	8
(Belgium) 1972	Did not qualify								6	2	2	2	10	6
(Socialist Federal Republic of Yugoslavia) 1976	Did not qualify								6	3	0	3	8	5
(Italy) 1980	Did not qualify								8	4	1	3	8	14
(France) 1984	Did not qualify								8	5	1	2	8	5
(West Germany) 1988	Did not qualify								6	1	1	4	2	10
(Sweden) 1992	Did not qualify								8	2	3	3	11	11
(England) 1996	Did not qualify								10	5	2	3	20	15
(Belgium) (Netherlands) 2000	Did not qualify								8	1	2	5	4	19
(Portugal) 2004	Did not qualify								8	0	3	5	0	8
(Austria) (Switzerland) 2008	Did not qualify								12	6	2	4	17	14
(Poland) (Ukraine) 2012	Did not qualify								10	2	3	5	9	13
(France) 2016	Round of 16	16th	4	1	0	3	2	3	10	6	3	1	16	8
(Europe) 2020	Did not qualify								10	4	2	4	11	16
(Germany) 2024	Did not qualify								10	3	0	7	9	13
(United Kingdom) (Republic of Ireland) 2028	To be determined								To be determined					
(Italy) (Turkey) 2032	To be determined								To be determined					
Total	Round of 16	1/17	4	1	0	3	2	3	130	47	27	56	140	167

*Denotes draws including knockout matches decided via penalty shoot-out.

== See also ==
- Northern Ireland at the FIFA World Cup
