= John McGuigan =

Scottish footballer (1932-2004)

Personal information
- Full name: John Joseph McGuigan
- Date of birth: 29 October 1932
- Place of birth: Motherwell, Scotland
- Date of death: 12 August 2004 (aged 71)
- Place of death: Bellshill, Lanarkshire, Scotland
- Height: 5 ft 7 in (1.70 m)
- Position: Inside forward

Youth career
- Muirkirk
- Bo'ness United

Senior career*
Years	Team	Apps	(Gls)
1953–1955	St Mirren	21	(4)
1955–1958	Southend United	125	(34)
1958–1962	Newcastle United	50	(15)
1962–1963	Scunthorpe United	57	(17)
1963–1965	Southampton	33	(8)
1965–1966	Swansea Town	27	(5)
1966–1967	Crewe Alexandra	0	(0)
1967	Rochdale	0	(0)
Total		313	(83)
- * Club domestic league appearances and goals

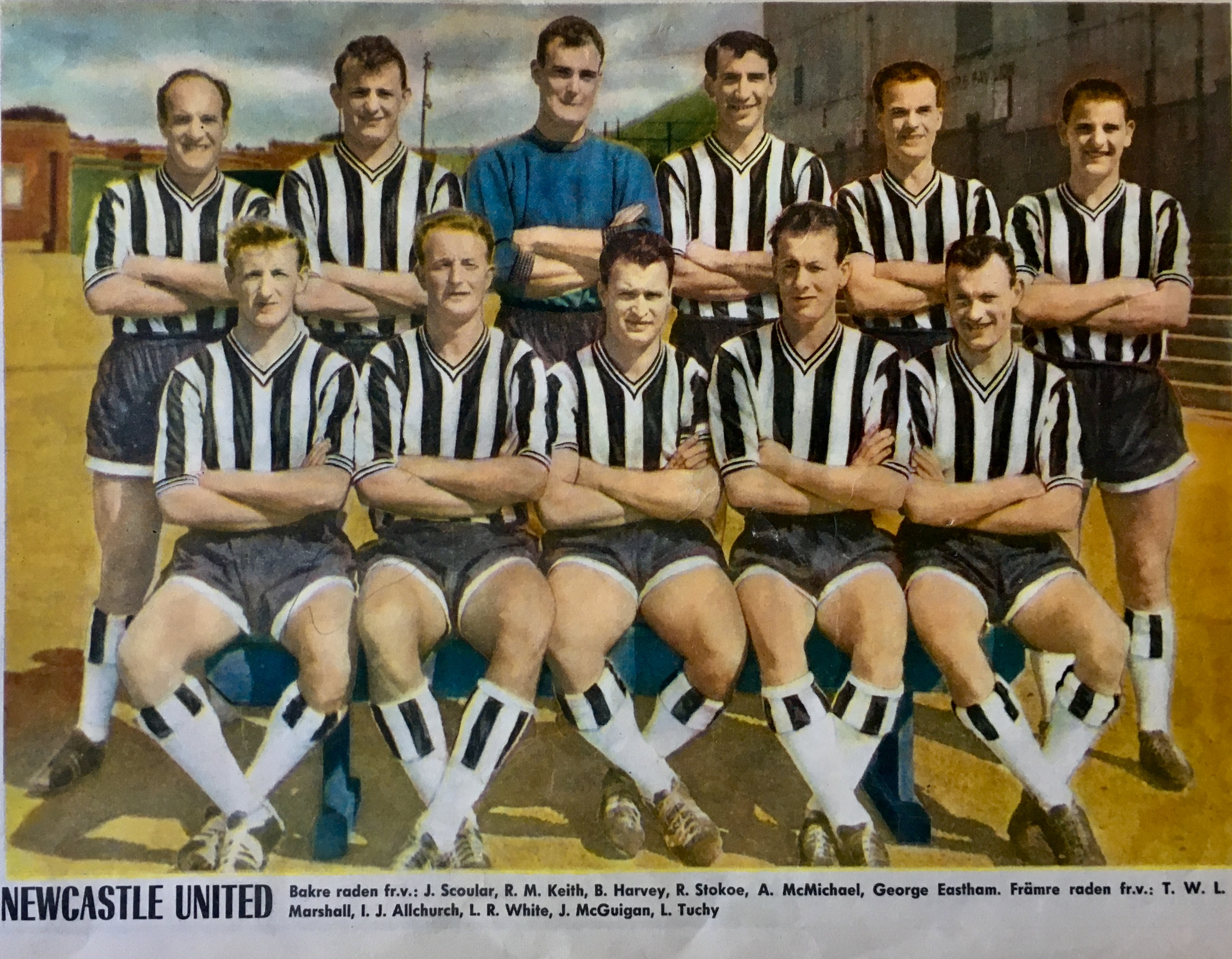
Newcastle United in 1960 – from left, standing: Jimmy Scoular, Dick Keith, Bryan Harvey (goalkeeper), Bob Stokoe, Alf McMichael and George Eastham; sitting: Terry Marshall, Ivor Allchurch, Len White, John McGuigan and Liam Tuohy.

John Joseph McGuigan (29 October 1932 – 12 August 2004) was a Scottish footballer who played as an inside-forward in the 1950s and 1960s. He started his career in the Scottish Football League with St Mirren before moving to England in 1955, where he played for several Football League clubs, including Southend United, Newcastle United, Scunthorpe United, Southampton and Swansea Town.

== Playing career ==
McGuigan was born in Motherwell; his father had played football before the war with Motherwell. McGuigan played junior football for Muirkirk and Bo'ness United, before signing professionally with St Mirren in November 1953.

In May 1955, he moved to England to join Southend United, where he stayed until June 1958, making 125 league appearances. He then moved to First Division Newcastle United for £2,250 in an exchange deal with Bill Punton joining Southend. He made a scoring debut, with Newcastle's goal in a 1–1 draw at Everton on 30 August. At St James' Park, he was in and out of the side and was never able to show any consistent form, and after three and a half years was transferred to Scunthorpe United of the Football League Second Division in January 1962 in another exchange deal, with Barrie Thomas coming to Newcastle. McGuigan was valued at £9,000, then a club record signing for Scunthorpe.

Scunthorpe played Southampton five times in league and cup matches in the 1962–63 season and McGuigan played in each of them, scoring two goals in League Cup matches. He clearly made an impression on the Southampton manager Ted Bates who signed him in August 1963 for a fee of £10,000. Described as "a tricky, versatile inside-forward", he made his first-team debut at home to Swansea Town on 21 September, scoring twice in a 4–0 victory. For the remainder of the 1963–64 season, he shared the inside-left position with Dave Burnside and Ian White, scoring eight goals in 21 appearances. but failed to score in 12 games in the following season, losing his place in the team to Jimmy Melia. In March 1965, Southampton accepted a bid of £6,500 and McGuigan left The Dell for South Wales.

== Later career ==
Following the end of his professional football career, McGuigan returned to Southampton to become the licensee of the Swan Hotel in Portsmouth Road, Woolston. After three years as a publican, he returned to Scotland where he applied for several football-related jobs without success. His failure to find employment in football left him disillusioned with the game, and he is reported to have "never been inside a football ground since".

He subsequently found employment with Rolls-Royce, working in the tool-room of their plant at Hillington, near Glasgow.

== Bibliography ==
- Chalk, Gary; Holley, Duncan; Bull, David (2013). All the Saints – A Complete Players' Who's Who of Southampton FC. Hagiology Publishing. ISBN 978-0-9926864-0-6.
- Holley, Duncan; Chalk, Gary (1992). The Alphabet of the Saints. ACL & Polar Publishing. ISBN 0-9514862-3-3.
- Holley, Duncan; Chalk, Gary (2003). In That Number – A Post-war Chronicle of Southampton FC. Hagiology Publishing. ISBN 0-9534474-3-X.
- Hugman, Barry (1981). Football League Players Records (1946–1981). Aylesbury: Rothmans Publications. ISBN 0-907574-08-4.
