= Břetislav Dolejší =

Czech footballer

Personal information
- Date of birth: 26 September 1928
- Place of birth: Czechoslovakia
- Date of death: 28 October 2010 (aged 82)
- Place of death: Los Angeles, United States
- Position: Goalkeeper

Senior career*
Years	Team	Apps	(Gls)
1952–1956	Dukla Prague		
1957–1960	Slavia Prague		

International career
1952–1958	Czechoslovakia	18	(0)
- * Club domestic league appearances and goals

Břetislav Dolejší (26 September 1928 – 28 October 2010) was a Czechoslovak football goalkeeper who played for Czechoslovakia in the 1958 FIFA World Cup. He played for Dukla Prague and Slavia Prague.

== Death ==
Břetislav Dolejší died of cancer on 28 October 2010, at the age of 82.
