= Dick Keith =

Northern Irish footballer (1933–1967)

Personal information
- Full name: Richard Matthewson Keith
- Date of birth: 15 May 1933
- Place of birth: Belfast, Northern Ireland
- Date of death: 28 February 1967 (aged 33)
- Place of death: Bournemouth, England
- Height: 6 ft 0 in (1.83 m)
- Position: Right-back

Youth career
- 33rd Old Boys

Senior career*
Years	Team	Apps	(Gls)
1950–1957	Linfield		
1957–1964	Newcastle United	208	(2)
1964–1966	Bournemouth & Boscombe Athletic	47	(0)
1966–1967	Weymouth		

International career
1957–1962	Northern Ireland	23	(0)
- * Club domestic league appearances and goals

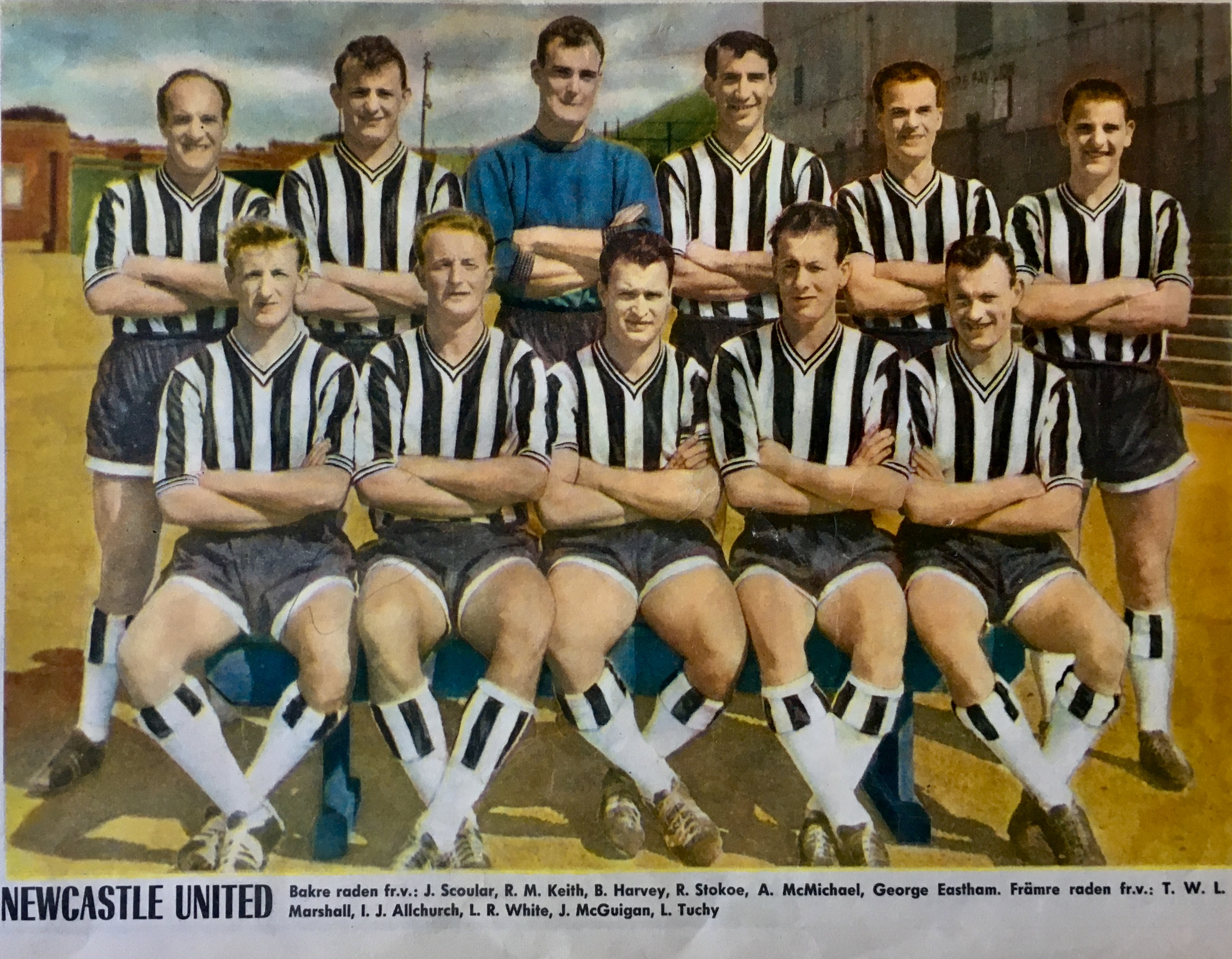
Newcastle United F.C. in 1960 with players from left, standing: James "Jimmy" Scoular, Richard Matthewson "Dick" Keith, Bryan Harvey (goalkeeper), Bob Stokoe, Alf McMichael and George Eastham; crouched from left: "Terry" W. L. Marshall, Ivor J. Allchurch, Leonard Roy "Len" White, John McGuigan and Liam Tuohy.

Richard Matthewson Keith (15 May 1933 – 28 February 1967) was a professional footballer from Northern Ireland who played as a right-back. He made over 200 appearances for English club Newcastle United between 1956 and 1964, and also played for Linfield, Bournemouth & Boscombe Athletic and Weymouth, and was a member of the Northern Ireland squad at the 1958 World Cup.

== Club career ==
Keith was born in Belfast on 15 May 1933 and began his career in the Irish League with Linfield. He won the Irish Cup with Linfield in 1953 and was named Ulster Footballer of the Year in 1956. He was transferred to Newcastle United in September 1956, where he went on to make 208 Football League appearances and became captain in 1962. He joined Bournemouth & Boscombe Athletic in February 1964 and later joined non-League club Weymouth.

== International career ==
Keith made 23 appearances for Northern Ireland between 1957 and 1962, and was part of the squad that reached the quarter-finals of the 1958 World Cup. He also played for the Northern Ireland B team and the Irish League representative team.

== Death ==
Keith died in Bournemouth on 28 February 1967 as a result of an accident at a builder's yard, when an automatic garage door he was dismantling collapsed on top of him. He was aged 33 and still playing for Weymouth at the time.
