= Alf McMichael =

Northern Irish footballer (1927-2006)

Personal information
- Full name: Alfred McMichael
- Date of birth: 1 October 1927
- Place of birth: Belfast, Northern Ireland
- Date of death: 7 January 2006 (aged 78)
- Height: 5 ft 10 in (1.78 m)
- Position: Left back

Youth career
- 194?–1945: Cliftonville

Senior career*
Years	Team	Apps	(Gls)
1945–1950	Linfield		
1950–1963	Newcastle United	402	(1)

International career
1949–1960	Northern Ireland	40	(0)

Managerial career
- 1963–1969: South Shields
- 1971–1972: Bangor
- * Club domestic league appearances and goals

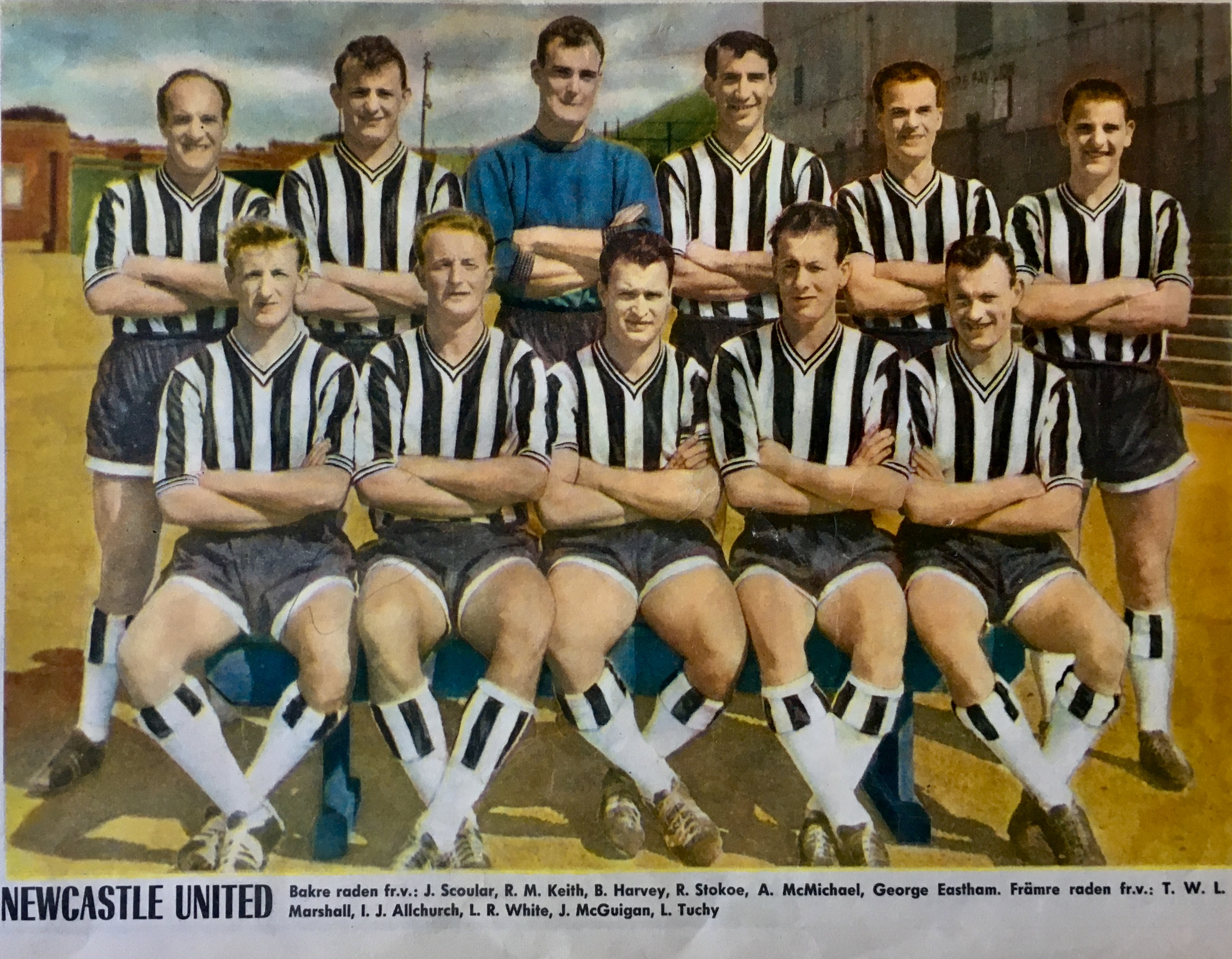
Newcastle United F.C. in 1960 with these players – from the left, standing: James "Jimmy" Scoular, Richard Matthewson "Dick" Keith, Bryan Harvey (goalkeeper), Bob Stokoe, Alf McMichael and George Eastham; crouched: "Terry" W. L. Marshall, Ivor J. Allchurch, Leonard Roy "Len" White, John McGuigan and Liam Tuohy.

Alfred McMichael (1 October 1927 – 7 January 2006) was a footballer who played as a left back.

Belfast-born McMichael began his career at Linfield, before signing for Newcastle United in 1949. He remained at Newcastle until 1962, appearing 433 times and scoring once for the club. He was part of the team that won the 1952 FA Cup final, after his disappointment of missing the final the year before through injury. At one point he was considered the best left-back in Britain and was a popular player amongst Newcastle United supporters.

He played in the FIFA World Cup of 1958 with the Northern Ireland national team. They passed the group stage as the 2nd of the group 1, winning 1-0 against Czechoslovakia, losing 3-1 against Argentina and tying 2-2 with Germany, subsequently defeating Czechoslovakia 2–1 in the tie-breaker. Then, they lost 4-0 against France in the quarter finals, ending their world cup dream.

He represented Northern Ireland 40 times.

After retiring from playing, he managed South Shields from 1963 until 1969, guiding them to the North Regional League title in 1966–67.

== Honours ==
=== As a player ===
Newcastle United

- FA Cup: 1951–52

=== As a manager ===
South Shields

- North Regional League: 1966–67
