= Wilbur Cush =

Northern Irish footballer

Personal information
- Date of birth: 10 June 1928
- Place of birth: Lurgan, Northern Ireland
- Date of death: 28 July 1981 (aged 53)
- Place of death: Lurgan, Northern Ireland
- Height: 5 ft 5 in (1.65 m)
- Positions: Half-back; inside forward

Youth career
- Shankill YMCA

Senior career*
Years	Team	Apps	(Gls)
1947–1957	Glenavon		
1957–1960	Leeds United	87	(9)
1960–1966	Portadown		
1966–1968	Glenavon		

International career
1948–1964	Irish League XI	39	(1)
1950–1961	Northern Ireland	26	(6)
1950–1959	Irish FA	5	(0)
- * Club domestic league appearances and goals

Wilbur W. Cush (10 June 1928 – 28 July 1981) was a Northern Irish football striker.

Billy Cush represented Northern Ireland at the 1958 World Cup, scoring the winning goal in their first ever final stages World Cup match, a 1–0 win over Czechoslovakia in Sweden.

He started his career in his native Northern Ireland with Glenavon F.C. In 1951/52 he helped Glenavon become the first club from outside of Belfast to win the Irish League and 5 years later followed it up with a second league title. In 1956/57, he was named as the Ulster Footballer of the Year. He moved to Leeds United in 1957 and took over the captaincy from recently departed Leeds legend John Charles. Cush was a very versatile player who could play at centre-back and centre-forward. His performances at Elland Road earned him his call up to Northern Ireland for the 1958 World Cup. Overall at Leeds he made 90 appearances and scored 9 goals. In 1960 he moved to Portadown F.C. later moving back to his first club, Glenavon F.C., as a player and later a coach. With his football career over, Wilbur became a butcher in Lurgan. He died in 1981.

Wilbur Cush was also a platoon Sergeant in the Ulster Special Constabulary. He served in Lurgan (J division County Armagh) and The Birches station County Armagh. He received the USC Long Service Medal.

Including matches for reserve teams, he has made at least 999 appearances in his career.

== See also ==
- Ulster Footballer of the Year
