= Erich Juskowiak =

German footballer (1926–1983)

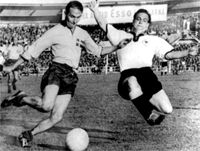
- Juskowiak (right) and Kurt Hamrin in 1958

Personal information
- Date of birth: 7 September 1926
- Place of birth: Oberhausen, Germany
- Date of death: 1 July 1983 (aged 56)
- Place of death: Düsseldorf, West Germany
- Position: Defender

Senior career*
Years	Team	Apps	(Gls)
1943–1946	FC 08 Oberhausen		
1946–1950	RW Oberhausen		
1950–1951	SSV 04 Wuppertal		
1951–1953	RW Oberhausen		
1953–1962	Fortuna Düsseldorf		

International career
1951–1959	West Germany	31	(4)
- * Club domestic league appearances and goals

Erich Juskowiak (7 September 1926 – 1 July 1983) was a German footballer who played as a left-back. He earned 31 caps and 4 goals for the West Germany national team between 1951 and 1959. He played in the World Cup Finals in 1958 where West Germany reached the semi-final.

== Career ==
Juskowiak was born in Oberhausen. He served in World War II where he got injured several times and even survived a shot in the head. After the war, Juskowiak joined Rot-Weiß Oberhausen where he began as an outside forward. It soon was discovered though that he was more useful as a defender. After switching to the right-back position, he got the attention of West Germany national team coach Sepp Herberger and debuted for West Germany on 23 December 1951, against Luxembourg.

Juskowiak's hopes of making the 1954 West Germany World Cup squad however did not materialize, as it took three years - now together with Toni Turek, the "football god" and world champion of 1954, playing for Fortuna Düsseldorf - before he played again for West Germany (December 1954). Switching from right back to left-back frequently in the next two years, Juskowiak finally settled as a left back in 1957. By that time, Juskowiak was rated as one of the best full backs in West Germany. Based on his performances in 1958 and 1959, Kicker (sports magazine) rated him world class in their biennial Rangliste des deutschen Fußballs (ranking list of German football). He was mostly known for his very hard shot, which earned him his nickname "Hammer".

The pinnacle of his career came when he was a starter for West Germany in the 1958 FIFA World Cup. In the semifinal against hosts Sweden, his opponent was outside right Kurt Hamrin. After Juskowiak was fouled by Hamrin, he struck Hamrin down in revenge and was sent off in the 59th minute. He was the first German player to be sent off in a World Cup game.

After several injuries, Juskowiak ended his career in August 1961. His penultimate game for Fortuna Düsseldorf ended on a less laudable note: after a verbal dispute with spectators in the game against VfB Bottrop, he just left the pitch shortly before the end of the game without returning.

He died in Düsseldorf in 1983 from a heart failure while driving his car. A year earlier, in April 1982 he had traveled to Gothenburg to make up with Kurt Hamrin.
