= Pavol Molnár =

Slovak footballer (1936–2021)

Personal information
- Full name: Pavol Molnár
- Date of birth: 13 February 1936
- Place of birth: Bratislava, Czechoslovakia
- Date of death: 6 November 2021 (aged 85)
- Place of death: Bratislava, Slovakia
- Height: 1.69 m (5 ft 7 in)
- Position: Forward

Senior career*
Years	Team	Apps	(Gls)
1955–1956	ŠK Slovan Bratislava	29	(8)
1956–1958	CH Bratislava	46	(15)
1959–1965	ŠK Slovan Bratislava	132	(39)
1965–1967	Inter Bratislava	35	(4)
1968	Sydney FC Prague		
1968–1969	WSV Donawitz	27	(3)

International career
1956–1962	Czechoslovakia	20	(3)
Medal record
Men's football
Representing Czechoslovakia
FIFA World Cup
Runner-up	1962 Chile
- * Club domestic league appearances and goals

Pavol Molnár (13 February 1936 – 6 November 2021) was a Slovak footballer who played as a forward. He played for Czechoslovakia national team in 20 matches and scored three goals.

He was a participant at the 1958 FIFA World Cup, where he played in three matches. Also participant at 1960 European Nations' Cup, where his team won the bronze medal and at the 1962 FIFA World Cup, where his team won the silver medal.

Molnár played for SK Slovan Bratislava and later CH Bratislava.
