= Tomáš Skuhravý =

Czech footballer

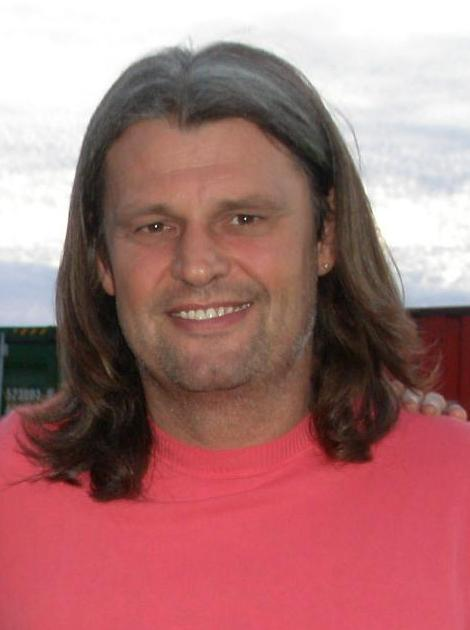
- Skuhravý in September 2008

Personal information
- Date of birth: 7 September 1965 (age 61)
- Place of birth: Český Brod, Czechoslovakia
- Height: 1.93 m (6 ft 4 in)
- Position: Striker

Youth career
- 1971–1980: Sokol Přerov nad Labem
- 1980–1982: Sparta Prague

Senior career*
Years	Team	Apps	(Gls)
1982–1984	Sparta Prague	29	(4)
1984–1986	RH Cheb	58	(17)
1986–1990	Sparta Prague	113	(55)
1990–1995	Genoa	164	(59)
1995–1996	Sporting CP	4	(0)
1996–1997	Viktoria Žižkov	0	(0)
Total		368	(135)

International career
1985–1993	Czechoslovakia	43	(14)
1994–1995	Czech Republic	6	(3)

Managerial career
- 2018—2019: Cuneo
- * Club domestic league appearances and goals

Tomáš Skuhravý (born 7 September 1965) is a Czech former footballer who played as a striker.

Having started his career at Sparta Prague at a youth level, he went to play for them during their period of dominance in 80s, winning numerous domestic titles and cups, and represented them in European competitions. He also had a notable spell at then top-flight RH Cheb, before moving onto Genoa.

At Genoa he became a prolific striker and reached the semi-finals of the 1991–92 UEFA Cup. In 1995 he moved to Sporting CP but suffered a knee injury soon after which would eventually cut his playing career short and he retired aged 32.

Internationally he represented Czechoslovakia and the Czech Republic, and most notably scored five goals for the former in the 1990 FIFA World Cup.

== Club career ==
On 28 September 1983, Skuhravý debuted for Sparta Prague against Real Madrid at the 1983–84 UEFA Cup, coming as a substitute to Vítězslav Lavička in the 60th minute.

Skuhravý signed for Serie A club Genoa from Sparta Prague in 1990, forming a prolific partnership with Uruguayan Carlos Aguilera. Tall and powerful, Skuhravý usually attained full shape and proficiency later in the season while the smaller and quicker Aguilera gave his best in the early matches. They gave Genoa a solid attack all-year round. In the 1990–91 season, the duo each scored 15 goals for tied-third in the scorers' standings, leading Genoa to a fourth place in the final standings. At 1991–92 UEFA Cup, Skuhravý helped Genoa reach the semi-finals in the UEFA Cup until the club was eliminated by eventual champions Ajax. He scored a total of 59 goals with Genoa, making him one of the best goalscorers for the Rossoblu in the modern era.

Skuhravý left Genoa in 1995 to join Portuguese club Sporting CP, where he suffered a knee injury and was sidelined until the end of 1995–96 Primeira Divisão. He retired from playing career at the age of 32 due to health issues.

== International career ==
At international level, Skuhravý played for Czechoslovakia and the newly-formed Czech Republic, playing a total of 49 international matches, scoring 17 goals. He represented Czechoslovakia with 43 matches and scored 14 goals, as well as six matches and three goals for the newly-formed Czech Republic.

In 1985, Skuhravý debuted for Czechoslovakia during a friendly match against Poland, replacing Václav Daněk. He participated in the 1990 FIFA World Cup, scoring five goals to become the second highest scorer for the tournament. This included the opening goal against the United States and a hat-trick against Costa Rica, in which all goals were scored by headers, the first time in World Cup history.

== Post-playing career ==
In September 2018, Skuhravý was announced to have returned football as coach of Serie C club Cuneo. He left Cuneo in June 2019 following the club's exclusion from the Italian football leagues due to financial problems.

In Italy it was reported that he lived in Celle Ligure, where he worked as a restaurant owner and football pundit for a local TV channel.

As his personal financial situation deterioted, he was employed as a sporting advisor at 1. FC Slovácko for a repoted minimum wage salary.

== Personal life ==
Skuhravý is divorced twice and has two daughters, one of whom, Michaela Skuhravá, works as a fashion designer. His cousin Roman Skuhravý is a former footballer and football coach who has managed several Czech and Slovak clubs.

He was declared bankrupt and mounting debts dating to as far back as 2005 rose to a reported 8 million crowns by 2026. Due to his financial situation he was living in a hotel belonging to 1. FC Slovácko owner Pavel Buran.

== Career statistics ==
=== International ===
Appearances and goals by national team and year
National team	Year	Apps	Goals
Czechoslovakia	1985	1	0
Czechoslovakia	1986	3	0
Czechoslovakia	1987	5	0
Czechoslovakia	1988	5	0
Czechoslovakia	1989	6	4
Czechoslovakia	1990	13	7
Czechoslovakia	1991	2	1
Czechoslovakia	1992	5	1
Czechoslovakia	1993	5	1
Czechoslovakia	Total	45	14
Czech Republic	1994	3	1
Czech Republic	1995	3	2
Czech Republic	Total	6	3
Career total		51	17

Club scores are listed first, with score column indicating score after each of Skuhravý's goal.

International goals by Tomáš Skuhravý
No.	Team	Date	Venue	Opponent	Score	Result	Competition	Ref
1	Czechoslovakia	9 May 1989	Stadion Letná, Prague, Czechoslovakia	Luxembourg	2–0	4–0	1990 FIFA World Cup qualification	
2	Czechoslovakia	9 May 1989	Stadion Letná, Prague, Czechoslovakia	Luxembourg	4–0	4–0	1990 FIFA World Cup qualification	
3	Czechoslovakia	7 June 1989	Wankdorf Stadion, Bern, Switzerland	Switzerland	1–0	1–0	1990 FIFA World Cup qualification	
4	Czechoslovakia	25 October 1989	Stadion Letná, Prague, Czechoslovakia	Switzerland	1–0	3–0	1990 FIFA World Cup qualification	
5	Czechoslovakia	25 April 1990	Wembley Stadium, London, England	England	1–0	2–4	Friendly	
6	Czechoslovakia	10 June 1990	Stadio Artemio Franchi, Florence, Italy	United States	1–0	5–1	1990 FIFA World Cup	
7	Czechoslovakia	10 June 1990	Stadio Artemio Franchi, Florence, Italy	United States	4–1	5–1	1990 FIFA World Cup	
8	Czechoslovakia	23 June 1990	Stadio San Nicola, Bari, Italy	Costa Rica	1–0	4–1	1990 FIFA World Cup	
9	Czechoslovakia	23 June 1990	Stadio San Nicola, Bari, Italy	Costa Rica	2–1	4–1	1990 FIFA World Cup	
10	Czechoslovakia	23 June 1990	Stadio San Nicola, Bari, Italy	Costa Rica	4–1	4–1	1990 FIFA World Cup	
11	Czechoslovakia	13 October 1990	Parc des Princes, Paris, France	France	1–2	1–2	UEFA Euro 1992 qualification	
12	Czechoslovakia	18 December 1991	Estádio Serra Dourada, Goiânia, Brazil	Brazil	1–2	1–2	Friendly	
13	Czechoslovakia	25 March 1992	Great Strahov Stadium, Prague, Czechoslovakia	England	1–0	2–2	Friendly	
14	Czechoslovakia	27 October 1993	Všešportový areál, Košice, Slovakia	Cyprus	3–0	3–0	1994 FIFA World Cup qualification	
15	Czech Republic	17 August 1994	Parc Lescure, Bordeaux, France	France	1–0	2–2	Friendly	
16	Czech Republic	26 April 1995	Stadion Letná, Prague, Czech Republic	Netherlands	1–1	3–1	UEFA Euro 1996 qualification	
17	Czech Republic	6 September 1995	Stadion Letná, Prague, Czech Republic	Norway	1–0	2–0	UEFA Euro 1996 qualification	

== See also ==
- List of FIFA World Cup top goalscorers
