= Gustáv Mráz =

Slovak footballer (1934–2025)

Personal information
- Date of birth: 11 September 1934
- Place of birth: Bratislava, Czechoslovakia
- Date of death: 2 June 2025 (aged 90)
- Height: 1.81 m (5 ft 11 in)
- Position: Defender

Senior career*
Years	Team	Apps	(Gls)
1955–1966	Inter Bratislava	106	(2)
1964–1965	→ Sparta Prague (loan)		

International career
1957–1959	Czechoslovakia	11	(0)
- * Club domestic league appearances and goals

Gustáv Mráz (11 September 1934 – 2 June 2025) was a Slovak footballer who played as a defender. He played for the Czechoslovakia national team in 11 matches including the 1958 FIFA World Cup. Mráz died on 6 June 2025, at the age of 90. He was the last Czech surviving player at World Cup 1958.

== Club career ==
Mráz spent the majority of his career with Czechoslovak First League club Inter Bratislava, scoring twice in 106 league appearances. During the 1964–65 season, Mráz played for Sparta Prague.
