= Pedro Dellacha =

Argentine footballer and coach (1926–2010)

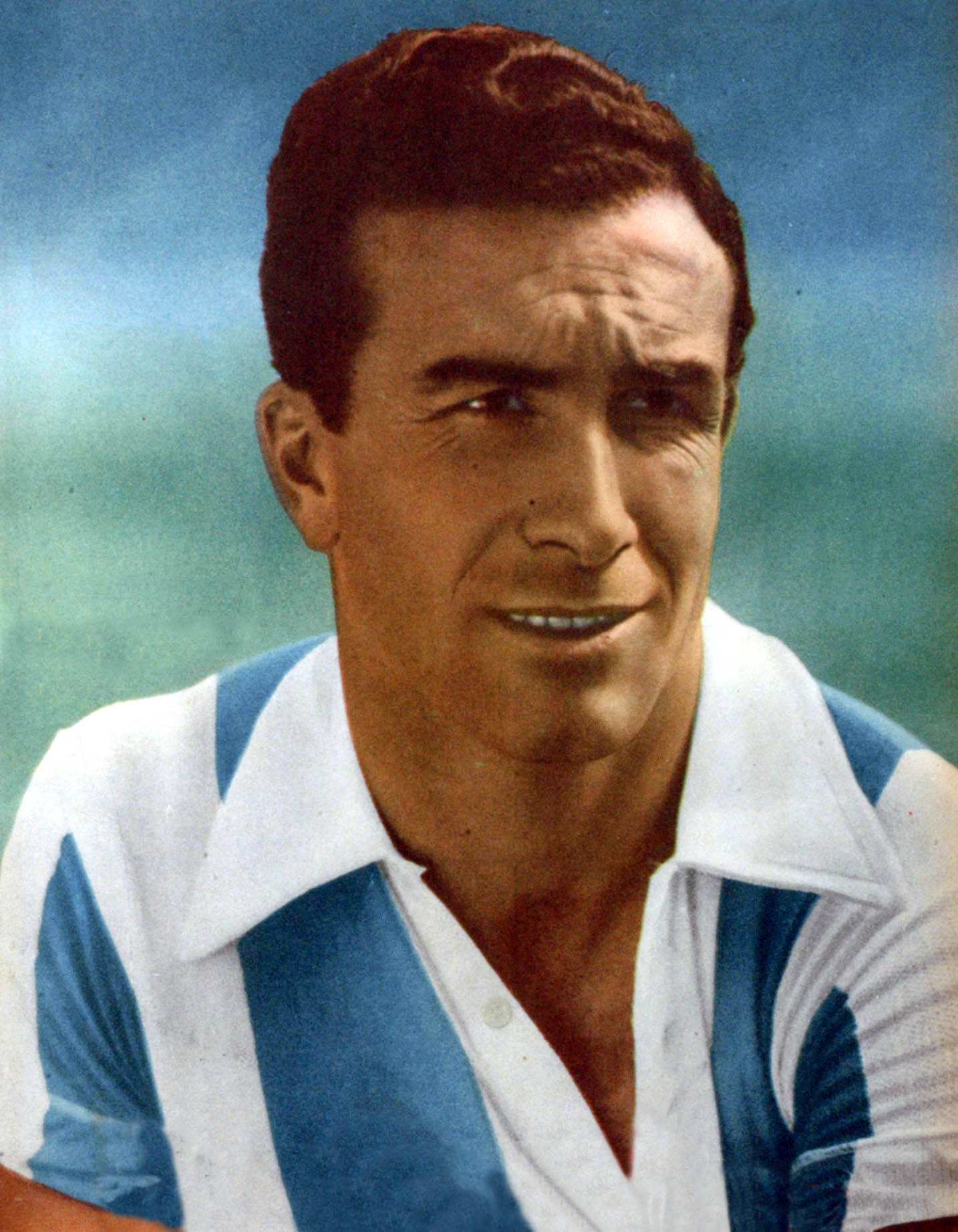
- Dellacha in 1952 when playing for Racing Club

Personal information
- Full name: Pedro Rodolfo Dellacha
- Date of birth: 9 July 1926
- Place of birth: Lanús, Argentina
- Date of death: 31 July 2010 (aged 84)
- Height: 1.74 m (5 ft 9 in)
- Position: Defender

Youth career
- 1945–1947: Quilmes

Senior career*
Years	Team	Apps	(Gls)
1947–1951	Quilmes	138	(0)
1952–1959	Racing Club	184	(1)
1959–1965	Necaxa		

International career
1953–1958	Argentina	35	(0)

Managerial career
- 1965: Ferro Carril Oeste
- 1960s: Lanús
- 1968–1969: Platense
- 1969–1970: San Lorenzo
- 1970–1972: Independiente
- 1972–1973: Celta de Vigo
- 1975: Independiente
- 1976: Racing Club
- 1977: Nacional
- 1978: Millonarios
- 1980–1981: Monterrey
- 1986–?: Huracán
- 1992: Alianza Lima
- 1992–1993: Santos Laguna
- * Club domestic league appearances and goals

Pedro Rodolfo Dellacha (9 July 1926 – 31 July 2010) was an Argentine football player and coach. A defender, he was the captain of the Argentina national team that won the 1957 Copa América and earned the nickname "Don Pedro del Area". As a manager, he won the Copa Libertadores twice and league championships in four countries.

== Playing career ==
Dellacha was born Lanús. He joined Quilmes Atlético Club in 1945, and in 1947 he made his debut for the first team. He was part of the squad that won the Primera B championship and promotion to the Argentine Primera in 1949. he played with the club until 1951, making a total of 141 appearances.

In 1952, Dellacha joined Racing Club where he went on to make 184 appearances and help the club to win the 1958 league championship.

In 1953, he appeared in the film "El hijo del crack".

Dellacha played 35 times for the Argentina national team between 1953 and 1958. he played in three editions of the Copa América winning the tournament twice in 1955 and 1957. In 1957 he was the captain of the team and was awarded the Olimpia de Oro for his role in leading them to victory. He also played in the 1958 FIFA World Cup.

Dellacha finished his playing career in Mexico with Club Necaxa.

== Managerial career ==
Dellacha went on to become a successful football manager, he won league titles in four countries (Argentina, Uruguay, Colombia and Peru) and led Independiente to two Copa Libertadores championships in 1972 and 1975.

== Honours ==
=== As a player ===
Racing Club

- Argentine Primera División: 1958

Necaxa

- Copa MX: 1959–60

Argentina

- Copa América: 1955, 1957

=== As a manager ===
Independiente

- Argentine Primera División: 1971
- Copa Libertadores: 1972, 1975

Nacional

- Uruguayan Primera División: 1977

Millonarios

- Categoría Primera A: 1978

Alianza Lima

- Peruvian Primera División: 1992
