= Václav Hovorka =

Czechoslovak footballer (1931–1996)

Personal information
- Date of birth: 19 September 1931
- Place of birth: Czechoslovakia
- Date of death: 14 October 1996 (aged 65)
- Position: Forward

Senior career*
Years	Team	Apps	(Gls)
- Slavia Prague

International career
1958	Czechoslovakia	4	(2)
- * Club domestic league appearances and goals

Václav Hovorka (19 September 1931 – 14 October 1996) was a Czechoslovak football forward who played for Czechoslovakia in the 1958 FIFA World Cup. He also played for Slavia Prague. Hovorka died on 14 October 1996, at the age of 65.
