= Fritz Herkenrath =

German footballer

Personal information
- Date of birth: 9 September 1928
- Place of birth: Cologne, Germany
- Date of death: 18 April 2016 (aged 87)
- Height: 1.77 m (5 ft 9 1/2 in)
- Position: Goalkeeper

Senior career*
Years	Team	Apps	(Gls)
1946–1951	Preußen Dellbrück		
1951–1952	1. FC Köln		
1952–1965	Rot-Weiss Essen		

International career
1954–1958	West Germany	21	(0)
- * Club domestic league appearances and goals

Friedrich "Fritz" Herkenrath (9 September 1928 in Cologne – 18 April 2016) was a football goalkeeper for West Germany at the 1958 FIFA World Cup. He earned 21 caps between 1954 and 1958.

He took his club team Rot-Weiss Essen to the peak of its history and won a national championship in 1955. The following season, Rot-Weiss Essen became the first German side to qualify for the European Cup.

Initially, Herkenrath played handball. He started out as a right winger and only later became a goalkeeper. Soon after World War II, Herkenrath switched from handball to football. Herkenrath began studying at the German Sport University Cologne where he first encountered Sepp Herberger, who was a tutor there. Playing for 1. FC Köln in the early 1950s, Herkenrath was mostly the second goalkeeper behind the Dutchman Frans de Munck. He joined Rot-Weiß Essen in 1952 and soon rose to prominence playing for Essen. Herkenrath became known as the "flying schoolmaster" due to his main occupation as a teacher.

He retired in 1962 after 336 games in the Oberliga West and became a professor at the college of education in Aachen. He died on April 18, 2016, at the age of 87.
