= Milan Dvořák =

Czech footballer (1934–2022)

Personal information
- Date of birth: 19 November 1934
- Place of birth: Prague, Czechoslovakia
- Date of death: 21 July 2022 (aged 87)
- Place of death: Czechia
- Position: Defender

Youth career
- 1946–1951: Železničáři Praha

Senior career*
Years	Team	Apps	(Gls)
1952–1954	Spartak Stalingrad		
1954–1970	Dukla Prague	261	(61)
1970–1971	Spartak BS Vlašim		
1971	FK Viktoria Žižkov		

International career
1952–1958	Czechoslovakia	13	(3)
- * Club domestic league appearances and goals

Milan Dvořák (19 November 1934 – 21 July 2022) was a Czech footballer. Though he played mostly on a position of defender, Dvořák was a universal player who could operate also as midfielder and forward.

Dvořák started his career at Bohemians Prague. At the age of 18 he already debuted in the Czechoslovakia national team. Two years later, in 1954 he moved to Dukla Prague to serve his military service there. He stayed at Dukla after his compulsory service ended. In the 1956 season he scored 15 goals and together with Miroslav Wiecek of Baník Ostrava became the top goalscorer of the Czechoslovak First League.

He appeared in 283 league matches and scored 61 goals. During his career at Dukla, Dvořák won the Czechoslovak First League six times, in 1956, 1961, 1962, 1963, 1964 and 1966.

Dvořák was a member of the Czechoslovakia national football team and played at the 1958 FIFA World Cup in Sweden, where he appeared in four matches and scored two goals.
