= Herbert Erhardt =

German footballer (1930–2010)

Herbert Erhard
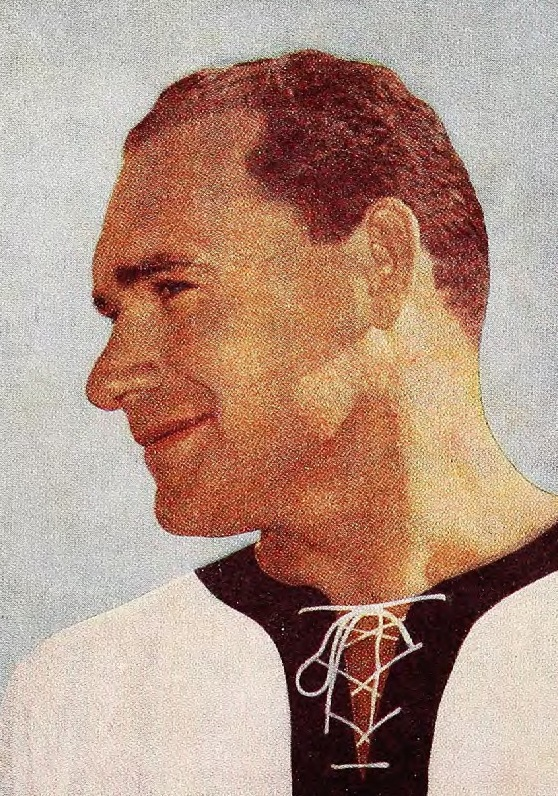
- Herbert Erhardt in 1961

Personal information
- Date of birth: 6 July 1930
- Place of birth: Fürth, Germany
- Date of death: 3 July 2010 (aged 79)
- Place of death: Fürth, Germany
- Height: 1.74 m (5 ft 9 in)
- Position: Defender

Senior career*
Years	Team	Apps	(Gls)
1948–1962	SpVgg Fürth	335	(19)
1962–1964	Bayern Munich	63	(5)
Total		398	(24)

International career
1953–1962	West Germany	50	(1)
Medal record
Representing West Germany
FIFA World Cup
Winner	1954 Switzerland
- * Club domestic league appearances and goals

Herbert "Ertl" Erhard (6 July 1930 – 3 July 2010), also known as Herbert Erhardt, was a German footballer who played as a defender.

== Club career ==
Erhard played for SpVgg Fürth and Bayern Munich. He was known for his hard tackling, doggedness and captain-like performances. The German Football Association lists Erhardt in the top 20 best German defenders of all time, and Bayern Munich included him in their best 16 in a team made up in the 1980s of famous past players.

Erhard started out as a full back before being used as a half back by the mid-1950s. He then settled in the center half position by the end of the 1950s.

== International career ==
Erhard earned 50 caps for the West Germany national team, and was a member of the German team which won the 1954 FIFA World Cup. He also participated in two other World Cups, in 1958 and 1962.

Although Erhard did not play in the 1954 World Cup, coach Sepp Herberger toyed with the idea of changing his defense by adding Erhardt as the left back in the final game against Hungary instead of Werner Kohlmeyer, but eventually decided to keep the same line-up as in the semifinal against Austria. Herberger proved his tactical acumen by moving Erhardt to central defense in early 1958. In this new stopper role, Erhard proved to be a stand-out for Germany during the 1958 FIFA World Cup and remained Germany's standard stopper until his retirement from international play in September 1962. Between 1959 and 1962, Erhard had captained West Germany 16 times.
