= Francisco Lombardo =

Argentine footballer

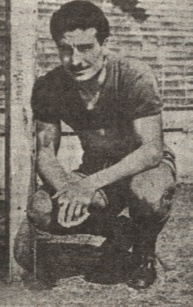

Personal information
- Full name: Juan Francisco Lombardo
- Date of birth: June 11, 1925
- Place of birth: Mendoza, Argentina
- Date of death: May 24, 2012 (aged 86)
- Place of death: Argentina
- Position: Defender

Senior career*
Years	Team	Apps	(Gls)
1947–1951	Newell's Old Boys	107	(1)
1952–1960	Boca Juniors	196	(1)
1961	River Plate	9	(0)

International career
1952–1959	Argentina	37	(0)
- * Club domestic league appearances and goals

Juan Francisco Lombardo (June 11, 1925 – May 24, 2012) was an Argentine football defender. He played a large part of his career for Argentine giants Boca Juniors and represented Argentina on 37 occasions.

== Club career ==
Lombardo started his career with Newell's Old Boys in Rosario, in 1952 he joined Boca Juniors where he played 196 games, his only goal for Boca came in a 2–2 draw with Club Atlético Platense in 1952.

In 1960 Lombardo left Boca on a free transfer to join their hated rivals River Plate, but he only made 9 appearances for the club before retiring later that year.

=== Club title ===
Season	Club	Title
1954	Boca Juniors	Primera Division Argentina

== International career ==
Lombardo made 37 appearances for Argentina, he played in 4 Copa Américas; 1955, 1956, and 2 in 1959. He also played in the 1958 FIFA World Cup.

== International titles ==
Season	Club	Title
1955	Argentina	Copa América 1955
1955	Argentina	Copa América 1959 (Argentina)
