= Jiří Feureisl =

Czech footballer (1931–2021)

Personal information
- Date of birth: 3 October 1931
- Place of birth: Strašice, Czechoslovakia
- Date of death: 12 May 2021 (aged 89)
- Height: 1.75 m (5 ft 9 in)
- Position: Forward

Senior career*
Years	Team	Apps	(Gls)
- Dynamo Karlovy Vary

International career
1956–1960	Czechoslovakia	11	(7)
Medal record
Men's football
Representing Czechoslovakia
Central European International Cup
Gold medal – first place	1955–1960 Central European International Cup
- * Club domestic league appearances and goals

Jiří Feureisl (3 October 1931 – 12 May 2021) was a Czechoslovak football forward who played for Czechoslovakia in the 1958 FIFA World Cup, scoring a goal in the 6–1 win over Argentina., and the 1955–1960 Central European International Cup, which Czechoslovakia national team won, with him being his teams joint top scorer.

At club level, he played for Dynamo Karlovy Vary.

Feureisl died on 12 May 2021, aged 89.

== International ==
Czechoslovakia

- Central European International Cup: 1955-60
