= Ludovico Avio =

Argentine footballer

Personal information
- Date of birth: 6 October 1932
- Place of birth: Pigüé, Argentina
- Date of death: 23 June 1996 (aged 63)
- Height: 1.73 m (5 ft 8 in)
- Position: Forward

Senior career*
Years	Team	Apps	(Gls)
- Club Atlético Vélez Sársfield

International career
- Argentina
- * Club domestic league appearances and goals

Ludovico Héctor Avio (6 October 1932 – 23 June 1996) was an Argentine football forward who played for Argentina in the 1958 FIFA World Cup. He also played for Club Atlético Vélez Sársfield.
