= Ladislav Novák =

Czech footballer and manager (1931–2011)

Personal information
- Date of birth: 5 December 1931
- Place of birth: Louny, Czechoslovakia
- Date of death: 21 March 2011 (aged 79)
- Place of death: Ostředek, Czech Republic
- Position: Defender

Youth career
- 1944–1950: SK Louny
- 1950–1951: Technomat Teplice

Senior career*
Years	Team	Apps	(Gls)
1952–1966	Dukla Prague	365	(23)
1966–1968	LIAZ Jablonec		

International career
1952–1966	Czechoslovakia	75	(1)

Managerial career
- 1968–1970: LIAZ Jablonec
- 1971–1972: Czechoslovakia
- 1972–1974: LIAZ Jablonec
- 1974–1977: K.S.C. Lokeren
- 1977–1979: Royal Antwerp FC
- 1979–1980: K. Beerschot V.A.C.
- 1980–1985: Dukla Prague
- 1986–1988: K.S.K. Beveren
- 1991: R.W.D. Molenbeek
Medal record
Men's football
Representing Czechoslovakia
FIFA World Cup
Runner-up	1962 Chile
- * Club domestic league appearances and goals

Ladislav Novák (5 December 1931 – 21 March 2011) was a Czech football defender and later a football manager. He played 75 matches for Czechoslovakia, 71 of them as a team captain.

He was a participant in the 1962 FIFA World Cup, where Czechoslovakia won the silver medal.

He was also a participant in the 1954 FIFA World Cup and 1958 FIFA World Cup.

In his country Novák played mainly for Dukla Prague and won 8 championship titles with them.

After end of his playing career he worked as a football manager and coached Dukla Praha and briefly Czechoslovakia national team. He won the championship title with Dukla as a coach in 1982.

== Honours ==
Czech Republic

- FIFA World Cup runner-up: 1962

Individual

- UEFA European Championship Team of the Tournament: 1960
