= Ján Popluhár =

Slovak footballer (1935–2011)

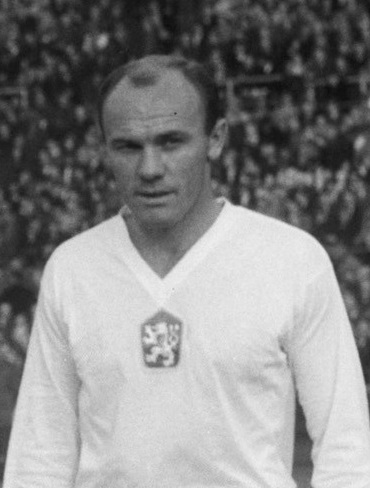
- Popluhár in 1966

Personal information
- Date of birth: 12 September 1935
- Place of birth: Čeklís, Czechoslovakia
- Date of death: 6 March 2011 (aged 75)
- Place of death: Bernolákovo, Slovakia
- Position: Sweeper

Youth career
- Slovan Bratislava

Senior career*
Years	Team	Apps	(Gls)
1955–1969	Slovan Bratislava	262	(21)
1955–1958	Rudá Hvězda Brno		
1969–1970	Lyon	46	(1)
1970–1972	Zbrojovka Brno		
1972–1979	Slovan Wien		
Total		308	(22)

International career
1958–1967	Czechoslovakia	62	(1)
Medal record
Men's football
Representing Czechoslovakia
FIFA World Cup
Runner-up	1962 Chile
- * Club domestic league appearances and goals

Ján Popluhár (12 September 1935 – 6 March 2011) was a Slovak footballer who primarily played as a sweeper for Slovak club ŠK Slovan Bratislava. At international level, he was also a member of the Czechoslovakia national team, playing in two World Cups (1958 and 1962).

== Club career ==
Popluhár started his football career after high school with RH Brno. However, he is best known for the 15 seasons he spent with ŠK Slovan Bratislava where he made 262 competitive appearances in defence, scoring 21 goals, and following further stints with Brno and Zbrojovka Brno finished on 306 Czechoslovak league games and a goalscoring tally of 24. After finishing his career with Slovan in 1968 he moved to French league side Olympique Lyonnais. Two seasons there were enough, but subsequently he spent five years with Austrian amateur club SK Slovan Vienna as player/coach. Many of the thousands of fans in Vienna thought that Popluhár would be shown up by players twenty years younger than he was, but this did not happen. However, at the age of 44 Popluhár realised that his playing career was over.

Slovan Bratislava coach Leopold Šťastný was famous for creating nicknames for his players, and so Popluhár became known in Slovak football circles as 'Bimbo'. "I was called this because I always looked, and indeed was, good-natured, and I would never hurt anybody", recalls Popluhár.

== International career ==
At the 1962 World Cup in Chile, instead of turning the situation to his team's advantage, Popluhár brought the referee's attention to the injured Pelé. In 1997, he was awarded the World Fair Play award for this sporting act. "I met Pelé several times, the first occasion in Chile and then in various international and club games. He was undoubtedly the best, but there were not many one-to-one situations he won and also not many Slovak players who scored in the famous Maracanã stadium. I belong to this lucky group after I scored with a free kick against Brazil in June 1966", he remembers.

Czechoslovak football was well represented in 1963 at Wembley Stadium in a match to mark the centenary of the English Football Association. Popluhár, along with Svatopluk Pluskal and Josef Masopust, played in a world team that included Alfredo Di Stéfano, Raymond Kopa, Uwe Seeler, Denis Law, Eusébio and Ferenc Puskás against an England eleven. Further appearances in all-star teams followed.

Popluhár was elected Footballer of the Year in the former Czechoslovakia for the first time in 1965, despite the great form of his Czechoslovak teammate Josef Masopust. "When I was at my peak, the conditions for a football player were modest here in Czechoslovakia, but the spirit and support of the spectators was incredible. I am not sure that today's players, however, would want to return to my era", he said.

After working for a sports company that went bankrupt and suffering prolonged health problems resulting in a modest invalidity pension and an unsuitable job, he returned to his footballing roots.

== Honours ==
Slovan Bratislava

- Czechoslovak Cup: 1962, 1963, 1968

Czechoslovakia

- 1958 FIFA World Cup: Group stage
- 1960 European Nations' Cup: Bronze Medal
- 1962 FIFA World Cup: Silver Medal

Individual

- World Soccer World XI: 1964, 1967, 1968
- Czechoslovak Footballer of the Year: 1965
- ADN Eastern European Footballer of the Season: 1965
- In 2000 Popluhár was elected as the best Slovak footballer of the 20th century.
- UEFA Slovak Golden Player: 2003
- Asteroid 267585 Popluhár, discovered by NEAT at Palomar Observatory in 2002, was named in his honor based on a suggestion by Slovak amateur astronomer Stefan Kürti. The official naming citation was published by the Minor Planet Center on 15 June 2011 (M.P.C. 75354).
