= Zdeněk Zikán =

Czech footballer (1937–2013)

Personal information
- Date of birth: 10 November 1937
- Place of birth: Prague, Czechoslovakia
- Date of death: 14 February 2013 (aged 75)
- Place of death: Prague, Czech Republic
- Position: Forward

Youth career
- 1946–1955: Motorlet Prague

Senior career*
Years	Team	Apps	(Gls)
1955	Motorlet Prague		
1956	Sparta Prague		
1956	Motorlet Prague		
1957	Dukla Prague		
1957–1960	Dukla Pardubice		
1960–1970	Spartak Hradec Králové		
1970	Transporta Chrudim		

International career
1958	Czechoslovakia	4	(5)
- * Club domestic league appearances and goals

Zdeněk Zikán (10 November 1937 – 14 February 2013) was a Czech footballer who played as a forward.

During his club career he played for several clubs, including Dukla Pardubice and Dukla Prague. During his time with Spartak Hradec Králové, he played in the 1960–61 European Cup, scoring against eventual finalists FC Barcelona in the quarter finals.

Zikán earned four caps and scored five goals for the Czechoslovakia national football team, including four goals in three games in the 1958 FIFA World Cup. He finished his international career with the distinction of having scored in every game in which he had played.

== Career statistics ==
=== International goals ===
#	Date	Venue	Opponent	Score	Result	Competition
1.	2 April 1958	Strahov Stadium, Prague, Czechoslovakia	West Germany	3–2	Win	Friendly
2.	11 June 1958	Olympiastadion, Helsingborg, Sweden	West Germany	2–2	Draw	1958 World Cup
3.	15 June 1958	Olympiastadion, Helsingborg, Sweden	Argentina	6–1	Win	1958 World Cup
4.	15 June 1958	Olympiastadion, Helsingborg, Sweden	Argentina	6–1	Win	1958 World Cup
5.	17 June 1958	Malmö Stadion, Malmö, Sweden	Northern Ireland	1–2	Lost	1958 World Cup
Correct as of 19 February 2013
