= Czechoslovakia national football team =

National football team of Czechoslovakia from 1920 to 1992

Czechoslovakia
1919–1993
- Association: Czechoslovak Football Association
- Most caps: Zdeněk Nehoda (91)
- Top scorer: Antonín Puč (34)
- Home stadium: Stadion Evžena Rošického (1926–1993)
- FIFA code: TCH
First colours	Second colours	Third colours

First international
- Hungary 2–1 Bohemia (Budapest, Hungary; 5 April 1903) (Note: A meeting on 1 April 1906 is regarded as the first official game for Bohemia by the Football Association of the Czech Republic (FAČR), with the meeting between Hungary and Bohemia on 5 April 1903 subsequently being recognised as a Prague representative team by the FAČR. The Hungarian Football Federation recognises the April 1903 meeting as official for Bohemia.); Post-independence; Czechoslovakia 4–1 Belgium (Paris, France; 24 June 1919)

Last international
- Belgium 0–0 Representation of Czechs and Slovaks (Brussels, Belgium; 17 November 1993)

Biggest win
- Czechoslovakia 7–0 Kingdom of SCS (Antwerp, Belgium; 28 August 1920); Czechoslovakia 7–0 Kingdom of SCS (Prague, Czechoslovakia; 28 October 1925)

Biggest defeat
- Hungary 8–3 Czechoslovakia (Budapest, Hungary; 19 September 1937); Scotland 5–0 Czechoslovakia (Glasgow, Scotland; 8 December 1937); Hungary 5–0 Czechoslovakia (Hungary; 30 April 1950); Hungary 5–0 Czechoslovakia (Hungary; 19 October 1952); Austria 5–0 Czechoslovakia (Zürich, Switzerland; 19 June 1954)

World Cup
- Appearances: 8 (first in 1934)
- Best result: Runners-up (1934, 1962)

European Championship
- Appearances: 3 (first in 1960)
- Best result: Champions (1976)

Olympic Games
- Appearances: 5 (first in 1920)
- Best result: Gold medal (1980)
Medal record
Men's football
FIFA World Cup
Silver medal – second place	1934 Italy	Team
Silver medal – second place	1962 Chile	Team
UEFA European Championship
Gold medal – first place	1976 Yugoslavia	Team
Bronze medal – third place	1960 France	Team
Bronze medal – third place	1980 Italy	Team
Olympic Games
Gold medal – first place	1980 Moscow	Team
Silver medal – second place	1964 Tokyo	Team
Central European International Cup
Gold medal – first place	1955–60	Team
Silver medal – second place	1927–30	Team
Silver medal – second place	1948–53	Team

The Czechoslovakia national football team (Czech: Československá fotbalová reprezentace, Slovak: Česko-slovenské národné futbalové mužstvo) represented Czechoslovakia in men's international football from 1919 to 1993. The team was controlled by the Czechoslovak Football Association, and the team qualified for eight FIFA World Cups and three European Championships. It had two runner-up finishes in World Cups in 1934 and 1962, and won the European Championship in the 1976 tournament.

At the time of the dissolution of Czechoslovakia at the end of 1992, the team was participating in UEFA qualifying Group 4 for the 1994 World Cup; it completed the remainder of this campaign under the name Representation of Czechs and Slovaks (RČS, Czech: Reprezentace Čechů a Slováků, Slovak: Reprezentácia Čechov a Slovákov) before it was disbanded in November 1993. Both the Czech and Slovak national teams are considered to be the joint successors of the Czechoslovak record.

== History ==
=== Bohemia ===
While part of the Austro-Hungarian Empire, the national team of Bohemia (established on 19 October 1901) played its first international on 5 April 1903, a 2–1 loss for Hungary in Budapest. On 7 October, Hungary came to Prague for a 4–4 draw. The two countries played three more matches up to 1908, including Bohemia's only victory on 6 October 1907. Bohemia played its last match on 13 June 1908, losing 4–0 at home to England.

After being expelled from FIFA due to objections from the Austrian Football Association, the ČSF founded the UIAFA along with French USFSA and English Amateur Football Association in March 1909. Bohemia won the UIAFA Great European football tournament in 1911, defeating the AFA England team 2–1 in the final.

=== Inter-war ===
After World War I, an independent Czechoslovakia made its first appearance in 1919 in the Inter-Allied Games in Paris, a large sports competition organized in celebration of the Allied victory in the War. However, the matches of the tournament are not included in the official FIFA register. Czechoslovakia topped their group with three wins over Belgium, United States, and Canada, thus reaching the final, where they defeated the hosts France with a dramatic 3–2 win, thanks to two late goals from Antonín Janda.

In the following year, Czechoslovakia participated in the 1920 Olympic event in Antwerp, opening with a 7–0 win over Yugoslavia on 28 August. This squad, which had thirteen players from the Inter-Allied roster, then beat Norway 4–0 the next day in the quarter-finals and France 4–1 in the semi-finals on the 31st. However, in the final against Belgium on 2 September, the Czechoslovaks left the field 2–0 down after 40 minutes in protest with the English referee John Lewis, and were ejected from the tournament. Czechoslovakia returned for the 1924 Olympics in Paris and defeated Turkey 5–2 in the first round, but was eliminated in the second 1–0 against Switzerland in a replay after a 1–1 draw.

The nation entered the World Cup for the first time in 1934, and won its qualifier against Poland after its neighbor withdrew following a 2–1 Czechoslovak win in the first leg. At the finals in Italy, Czechoslovakia advanced past Romania, Switzerland, and Germany to reach the final, where it lost 2–1 to the host country after extra time. Oldřich Nejedlý won the Golden Shoe with five goals in the tournament.

Czechoslovakia qualified for the 1938 FIFA World Cup in France with a 7–1 aggregate victory over Bulgaria, and reached the quarter-finals with a 3–0 win over the Netherlands in Le Havre. In the quarter-final against Brazil, known as the Battle of Bordeaux for its rough play, Czechoslovakia lost the replay 2–1.

In 1939, under the German occupation name of "Bohemia", the team played three matches, defeating Yugoslavia 7–3 and drawing with both Ostmark (occupied Austria) and Germany itself.

=== Post-World War II ===
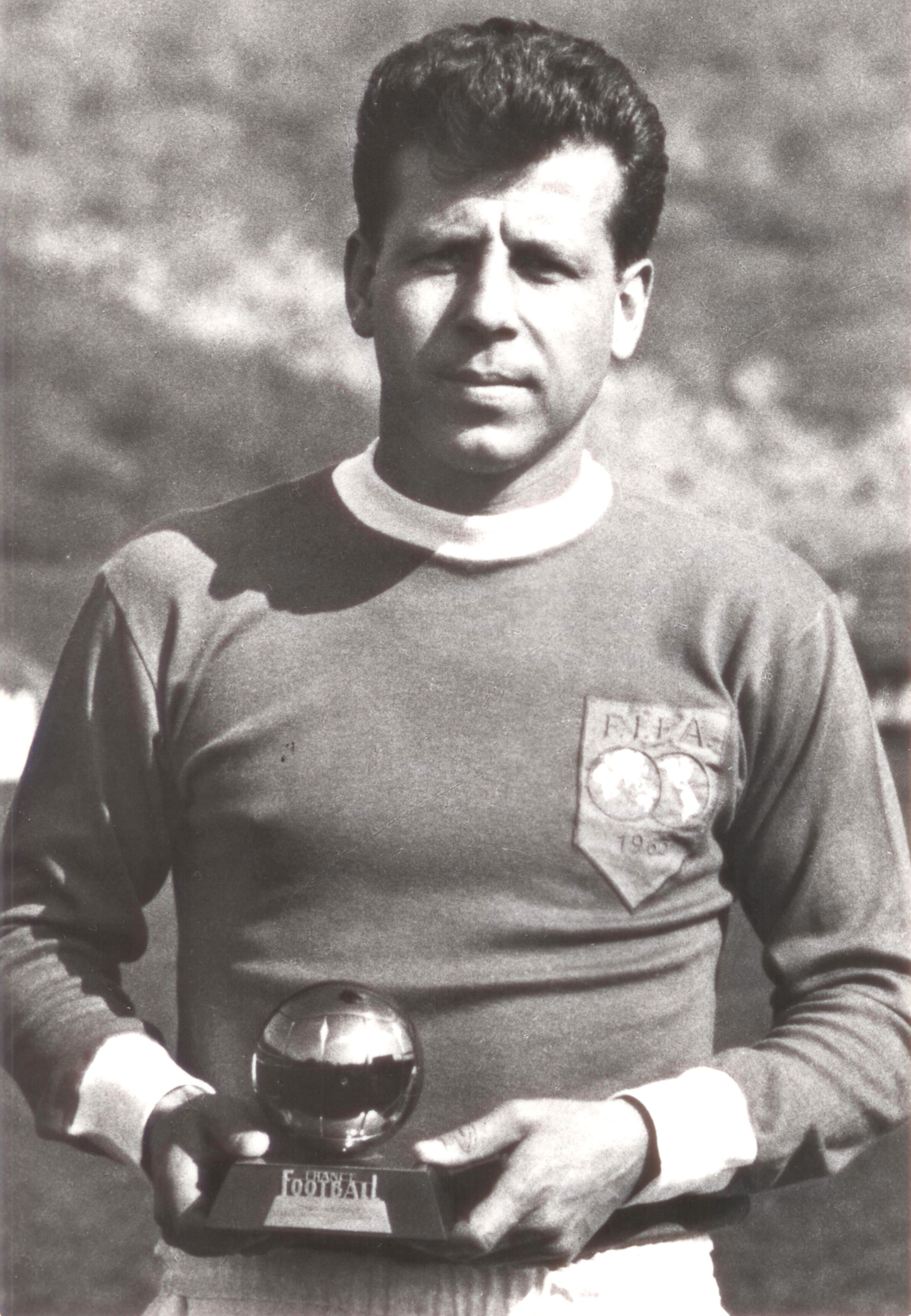
Josef Masopust won the Ballon d'Or for his performance in the Czechoslovakia side which reached the 1962 FIFA World Cup Final

After an absence from the 1950 qualification campaign, Czechoslovakia qualified for 1954 by topping its qualifying group unbeaten against Bulgaria and Romania with three wins and a draw. However, in the finals in Switzerland, it was eliminated from a strong group after defeats to Uruguay and Austria.

It also topped its qualifying group for the 1958 FIFA World Cup in Sweden, ahead of Wales and East Germany. They opened their finals campaign on 8 June with a 1–0 defeat to Northern Ireland in Halmstad, followed by a 2–2 draw with reigning champions West Germany and a 6–1 win over Argentina. On 17 June, Czechoslovakia lost a play-off to advance into the knockout stages 2–1 to Northern Ireland in Malmö.

=== Modern age ===
On 5 April 1959, Czechoslovakia played the first ever qualifying match in a UEFA European Championship, losing 2–0 away to the Republic of Ireland but eventually advancing 4–2 on aggregate. Subsequent victories over Denmark (7–3 aggregate) and Romania (5–0 aggregate) put the country into the four-team finals in France. It lost 3–0 to the Soviet Union in the semi-final but gained third place with a 2–0 win over the hosts at the Stade Velodrome in Marseille.

Czechoslovakia qualified for the 1962 FIFA World Cup in Chile by defeating Scotland 4–2 after extra time in a play-off in Brussels, Belgium, after finishing level in their qualifying group. In the group at the finals, Czechoslovakia opened with a 1–0 win over Spain from a Jozef Štibrányi goal, and then drew 0–0 with holders Brazil. In the last group game on 7 June, Václav Mašek put Czechoslovakia ahead against Mexico in 12 seconds; the team lost 3–1 but advanced nonetheless.

After goalkeeper Viliam Schrojf's performance, a goal from Adolf Scherer in Rancagua was enough to beat Hungary in the quarter-final, and two more late goals by him against Yugoslavia put Czechoslovakia into their second World Cup final. In the final at the Estadio Nacional de Chile in Santiago, Josef Masopust put Czechoslovakia ahead after 15 minutes by finishing Scherer's pass, but Brazil soon equalised and exploited Schrojf's errors to win 3–1. Masopust's inspiration was awarded with the 1962 Ballon d'Or.

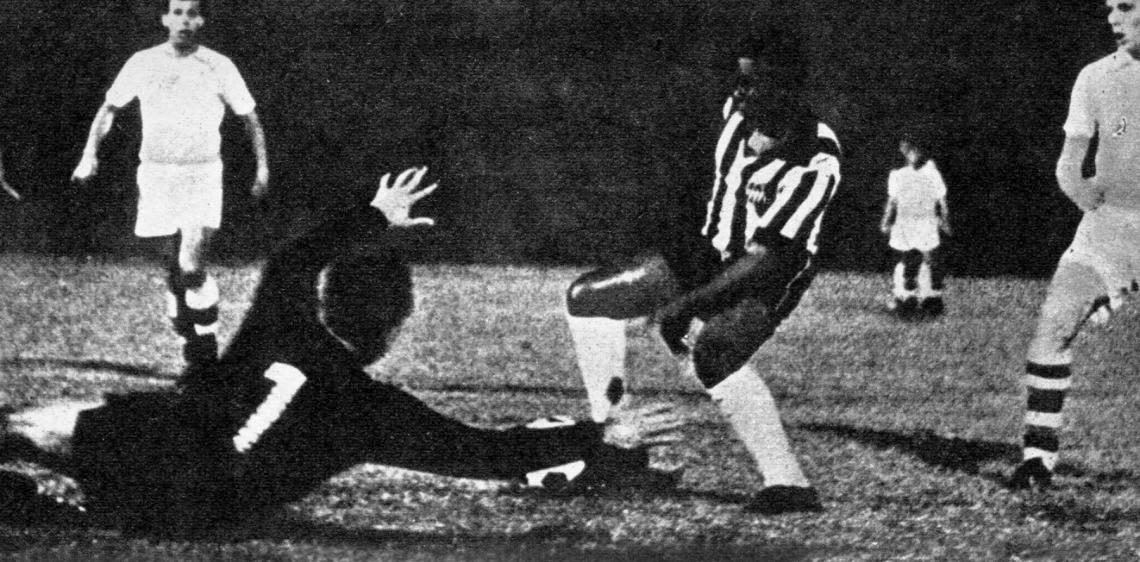
Czechoslovakia v Santos FC friendly match in Chile, 1965

Czechoslovakia did not go to the 1966 FIFA World Cup, with Portugal topping their qualifying group, nor did they qualify for the European Championships of 1964 and 1968. On 3 December 1969, they defeated Hungary 4–1 in Marseille in a play-off to reach the 1970 FIFA World Cup in Mexico, having finished joint top of their qualifying group. Czechoslovakia lost all three of their matches in the 1970 World Cup, in a group featuring holders England and eventual winners Brazil.

After missing out on the 1972 European Championship and the 1974 World Cup, Czechoslovakia reached the 1976 European Championship in Yugoslavia, topping a group featuring England, Portugal, and Cyprus, before defeating the Soviet Union 4–2 in a play-off. In the semi-final in Zagreb, they advanced after beating the Netherlands 3–1 after extra time. In the final on 20 June at Crvena Zvezda Stadium in Belgrade, Czechoslovakia led 2–0 before the game went to penalties at a 2–2 draw. Antonin Panenka scored the winning penalty with a chip, subsequently referred to by his name when executed by other players. In that squad, 16 of 22 players in the squad were Slovak and in both matches in the final tournament, 9 of 13 players were Slovak.

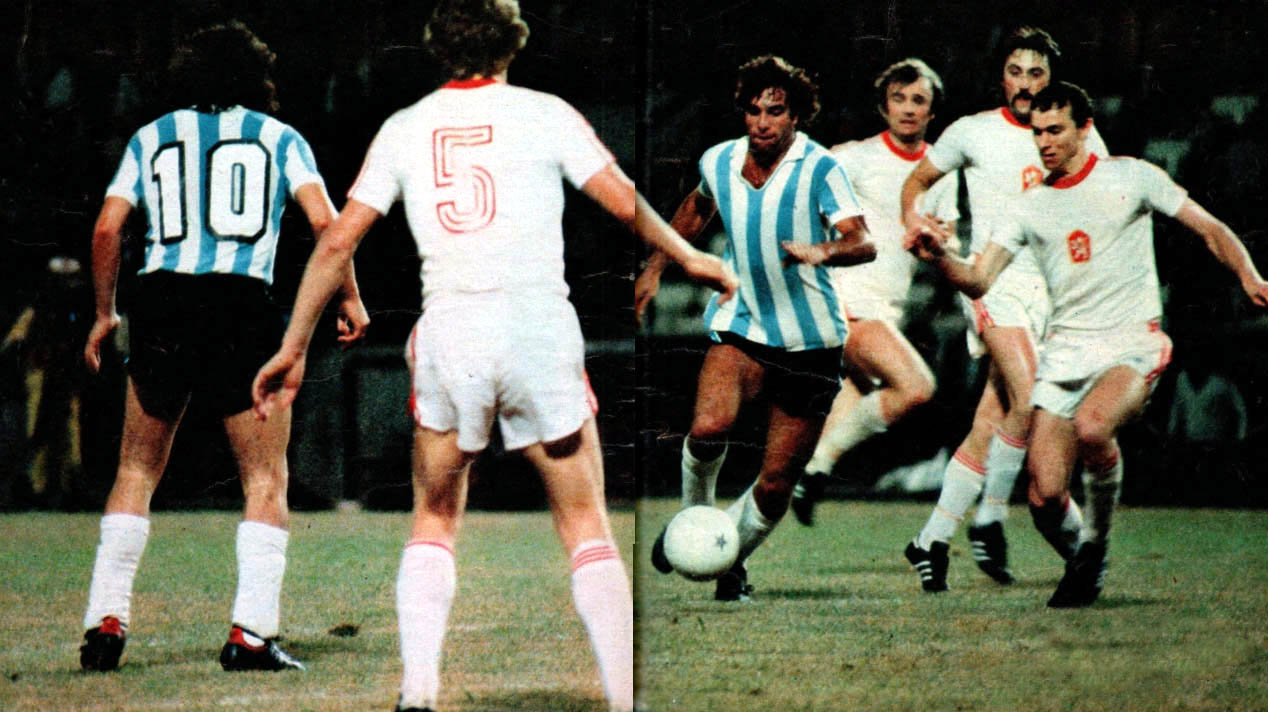
Czechoslovakia playing Racing Club during their tour on Argentina in 1979

Czechoslovakia did not qualify for the 1978 FIFA World Cup, as Scotland won their group. The country did qualify for Euro 1980, and by coming second in its group behind West Germany faced the hosts Italy in a third-place play-off, which it won on sudden-death penalties at the Stadio San Paolo in Naples. At the 1982 FIFA World Cup in Spain, Czechoslovakia was eliminated in the group stage after draws with Kuwait and France and losing 2–0 to England. The country's last major tournament was the 1990 FIFA World Cup in Italy, where in the group it opened with a 5–1 victory against the United States before defeating Austria with a penalty from Michal Bilek, enough to advance despite losing 2–0 to the hosts at the Stadio Olimpico. In the last 16 at the Stadio San Nicola in Bari, a hat-trick from Tomáš Skuhravý featured in a 4–1 in over Costa Rica. Czechoslovakia was eliminated on 1 July in a quarter-final at the San Siro, losing 1–0 from a Lothar Matthäus penalty against eventual winners West Germany. Later that month, manager Jozef Vengloš who had led Czechoslovakia in the tournament was appointed as the first foreign manager in English football, at Aston Villa.

=== Dissolution ===
In December 1991, the draw was made for the qualifying competition for the 1994 World Cup, with Czechoslovakia drawn in Group 4 alongside Romania, Belgium, Wales, Cyprus and the Faroe Islands. Qualifying began in April 1992 and was scheduled to conclude in November 1993. However, during the period of the qualification tournament, the two distinct parts of Czechoslovakia decided to dissolve the country into two newly independent states - the Czech Republic and Slovakia. The dissolution took place on 31 December 1992, eleven months prior to the end of World Cup qualification. The national team had, by then, played three of their qualifying games, meaning that it was too late to make changes to the process. As a result, the single team continued under the new name Representation of Czechs and Slovaks, with the intention that new teams representing the two new nations be formed once the single team's participation in the 1994 World Cup ended. The team's last match was on 17 November 1993 against Belgium in Brussels, a goalless draw that eliminated them from qualification. The RCS top scorer with six goals was Peter Dubovský, who scored a hat-trick in the match against Romania in Všešportový areál on 2 June 1993. Following the establishment of separate football federations for both new nations, the Czech Republic and Slovakian teams both played their first internationals in February 1994.

== Kit history ==
1934–1976	1950–1967 (away)	1980–1989	1990 Home	1990 Away	1991–93 Home	1992–93 Away

Year	Kit supplier
1976−1993	(Germany) Adidas

== Competitive record ==
=== FIFA World Cup ===
FIFA World Cup record										Qualification record						
Year	Result	Position	Pld	W	D	L	GF	GA	Squad	Pld	W	D	L	GF	GA	—
(Uruguay) 1930	Did not enter									Did not enter						
(Italy) 1934	Runners-up	2nd	4	3	0	1	9	6	Squad	2	2	0	0	4	1	1934
(France) 1938	Quarter-finals	5th	3	1	1	1	5	3	Squad	2	1	1	0	7	1	1938
(Brazil) 1950	Did not enter									Did not enter						
(Switzerland) 1954	Group stage	14th	2	0	0	2	0	7	Squad	4	3	1	0	5	1	1954
(Sweden) 1958	Group stage	9th	4	1	1	2	9	6	Squad	4	3	0	1	9	3	1958
(Chile) 1962	Runners-up	2nd	6	3	1	2	7	7	Squad	5	4	0	1	20	7	1962
(England) 1966	Did not qualify									6	3	1	2	12	4	1966
(Mexico) 1970	Group stage	15th	3	0	0	3	2	7	Squad	7	5	1	1	16	7	1970
(West Germany) 1974	Did not qualify									4	2	1	1	9	3	1974
(Argentina) 1978	Did not qualify									4	2	0	2	4	6	1978
(Spain) 1982	Group stage	19th	3	0	2	1	2	4	Squad	8	4	2	2	15	6	1982
(Mexico) 1986	Did not qualify									8	3	2	3	11	12	1986
(Italy) 1990	Quarter-finals	6th	5	3	0	2	10	5	Squad	8	5	2	1	13	3	1990
(United States) 1994	Did not qualify									10	4	5	1	21	9	1994
Total	Runners-up	8/15	30	11	5	14	44	45	—	72	41	16	15	146	63	—

=== UEFA European Championship ===
UEFA European Championship record										Qualification record						
Year	Result	Position	Pld	W	D	L	GF	GA	Squad	Pld	W	D	L	GF	GA	—
(France) 1960	Third place	3rd	2	1	0	1	2	3	Squad	6	4	1	1	16	5	1960
(Spain) 1964	Did not qualify									2	0	1	1	2	3	1964
(Italy) 1968	Did not qualify									6	3	1	2	8	4	1968
(Belgium) 1972	Did not qualify									6	4	1	1	11	4	1972
(Socialist Federal Republic of Yugoslavia) 1976	Champions	1st	2	1	1	0	5	3	Squad	8	5	2	1	19	7	1976
(Italy) 1980	Third place	3rd	4	1	2	1	5	4	Squad	6	5	0	1	17	4	1980
(France) 1984	Did not qualify									8	3	4	1	15	7	1984
(West Germany) 1988	Did not qualify									6	2	3	1	7	5	1988
(Sweden) 1992	Did not qualify									8	5	0	3	12	9	1992
Total	1 Title	3/9	8	3	3	2	12	10	—	56	31	13	12	107	48	—

=== Olympic Games ===
Olympic Games record
Year	Result	Position	Pld	W	D	L	GF	GA	Squad
(United Kingdom) 1908	Did not enter								
(Sweden) 1912	Did not enter								
(Belgium) 1920	Disqualified (Note: Their protests, translated from the original French, were as follows: 1. We were allocated an English linesman, which is in contradiction with the rules which state that each participating nation has the right to one of both linesman. This violation of the rules was prejudicial to us during the game, because the English linesman was not impartial and this is why we seek the cancellation of the match. Immediately after the game we brought this notice to the attention of M. Rodolphe Seeldrayers.; 2. The majority of the decisions of the referee Mr. Lewis were wrong and it was obvious that it gave the public the wrong impression about our game. Also both Belgian goals were the result of incorrect decisions of the referee and we seek a rigorous investigation on that point.; 3. During the match, Belgian soldiers were introduced to the crowd until they circled the pitch and because of their provocative presence our players were unable to play their normal game. As a result of the very regrettable incident at the end of the match when there was a pitch invasion led by the soldiers and our national flag was insulted we will not participate until we have received an apology from the (Belgian) soldiers.)		4	3	0	1	15	3	Squad
(France) 1924	Second round	9th	3	1	1	1	6	4	Squad
(Netherlands) 1928	Did not enter								
(Nazi Germany) 1936	Did not enter								
(United Kingdom) 1948	Did not enter								
(Finland) 1952	Did not enter								
(Australia) 1956	Did not enter								
(Italy) 1960	Did not qualify								
(Japan) 1964	Silver medal	2nd	6	5	0	1	19	5	Squad
(Mexico) 1968	Group stage	9th	3	1	1	1	10	3	Squad
(West Germany) 1972	Did not enter								
(Canada) 1976	Did not enter								
(Soviet Union) 1980	Gold medal	1st	6	4	2	0	10	1	Squad
(United States) 1984	Withdrew								
(South Korea) 1988	Did not qualify								
Total	Gold medal	5/17	22	14	4	4	60	16	—

== Player records ==
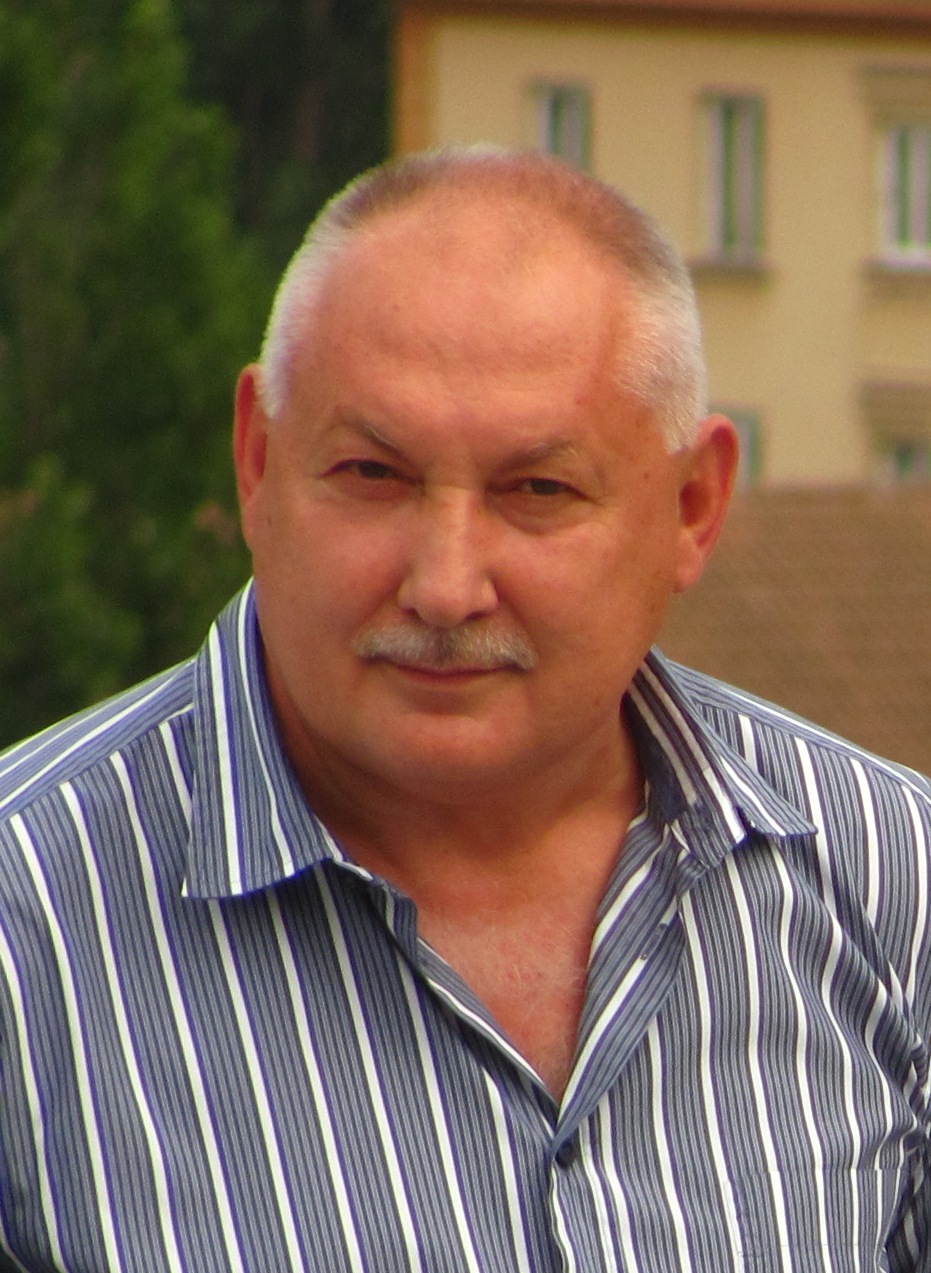
Zdeněk Nehoda

Most capped players
Rank	Player	Caps	Goals	Career
1.	Zdeněk Nehoda	90	31	1971–1987
2.	Marián Masný	75	18	1974–1982
2.	Ladislav Novák	75	1	1952–1966
4.	František Plánička	73	0	1926–1938
5.	Karol Dobiaš	67	6	1967–1980
6.	Josef Masopust	63	10	1954–1966
6.	Ivo Viktor	63	0	1966–1977
8.	Ján Popluhár	62	1	1958–1967
9.	Antonín Puč	60	34	1926–1938
10.	Antonín Panenka	59	17	1973–1982

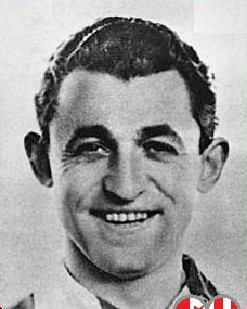
Antonín Puč

Top goalscorers
Rank	Player	Goals	Caps	Ratio	Career
1.	Antonín Puč	34	60	0.57	1926–1938
2.	Zdeněk Nehoda	31	90	0.34	1971–1987
3.	Oldřich Nejedlý	28	43	0.65	1931–1938
3.	Josef Silný	28	50	0.56	1925–1934
5.	Adolf Scherer	22	36	0.61	1958–1964
5.	František Svoboda	22	43	0.51	1927–1937
7.	Marián Masný	18	75	0.24	1974–1982
8.	Antonín Panenka	17	59	0.29	1973–1982
9.	Jozef Adamec	14	44	0.32	1960–1971
9.	Tomáš Skuhravý (Note: Tomáš Skuhravý also played for Representation of Czechs and Slovaks during the 1994 FIFA World Cup qualification and then the Czech Republic national football team until 1995, for whom he scored three further goals.)	14	43	0.33	1985–1993

== Head to head record (1908–1993) ==
Opponent	P	W	D	L
Albania	5	3	0	2
Argentina	6	1	3	2
Australia	8	6	2	0
Austria	37	18	11	8
Belgium	10	5	2	3
Brazil	17	2	6	9
Bulgaria	14	4	3	7
Chile	1	0	0	1
Costa Rica	1	1	0	0
Cyprus	6	4	2	0
Denmark	14	9	5	0
East Germany	15	4	4	7
Egypt	3	1	0	2
England	13	2	3	8
Faroe Islands	2	2	0	0
Finland	5	2	2	1
France	20	9	4	7
Germany	18	3	5	10
Greece	5	5	0	0
Hungary	44	11	12	21
Iceland	5	4	1	0
Iran	1	1	0	0
Italy	26	8	9	9
Kuwait	1	0	1	0
Latvia	1	1	0	0
Luxembourg	7	6	1	0
Malaysia	1	0	0	1
Malta	2	1	1	0
Mexico	2	1	0	1
Netherlands	8	5	1	2
Northern Ireland	2	0	0	2
Norway	4	4	0	0
Poland	19	10	5	4
Portugal	9	3	3	3
Republic of Ireland	12	7	1	4
Romania	29	17	7	5
Scotland	10	4	1	5
Soviet Union	12	2	4	6
Spain	12	7	1	4
Sweden	16	9	4	3
Switzerland	27	14	6	7
Turkey	10	7	2	1
UEFA	1	1	0	0
United States	1	1	0	0
Uruguay	3	1	0	2
Wales	12	6	3	3
Yugoslavia	31	18	4	9

== Honours ==
=== Global ===
- FIFA World Cup
  - (silver) Runners-up (2): 1934, 1962
- Olympic Games
  - (gold) Gold medal (1): 1980
  - (silver) Silver medal (1): 1964

=== Continental ===
- UEFA European Championship
  - (gold) Champions (1): 1976
  - (bronze) Third place (2): 1960, 1980

=== Regional ===
- Central European International Cup
  - (gold) Champions (1): 1955–60
  - (silver) Runners-up (2): 1927–30, 1948–53

=== Summary ===
Competition	1st place, gold medalist(s)	2nd place, silver medalist(s)	3rd place, bronze medalist(s)	Total
FIFA World Cup	0	2	0	2
Olympic Games	1	1	0	2
UEFA European Championship	1	0	2	3
Central European International Cup	1	2	0	3
Total	3	5	2	10

== See also ==
- Czech Republic national football team
- Slovakia national football team

== Notes ==
Preceded by 1972 West Germany	European Champions; 1976 (First title)	Succeeded by 1980 West Germany
