= 1962 FIFA World Cup Group 3 =

Football tournament group stage

Group 3 of the 1962 FIFA World Cup took place from 30 May to 7 June 1962. The group consisted of Brazil, Czechoslovakia, Mexico, and Spain.

== Standings ==
Pos	Team	Pld	W	D	L	GF	GA	GR	Pts	Qualification
1	Brazil	3	2	1	0	4	1	4.000	5	Advance to knockout stage
2	Czechoslovakia	3	1	1	1	2	3	0.667	3	Advance to knockout stage
3	Mexico	3	1	0	2	3	4	0.750	2 (Note: Mexico finished ahead of Spain on goal average.)	
4	Spain	3	1	0	2	2	3	0.667	2	

Source: FIFA

== Matches ==
All times listed are local time.

=== Brazil vs Mexico ===
Brazilians attacked and Mexicans defended for most of the match. In the first half Pelé hit the woodwork with a free kick outside the box. Ten minutes after the break he made a cross from the right on Zagallo who headed the first goal. Then, after 73 minutes, Pele dribbled past four defenders and scored with his left foot from inside the penalty area.

30 May 1962
15:00 CLT (UTC-04)

Brazil	2–0	Mexico
Zagallo 56'; Pelé 73'

Estadio Sausalito, Viña del Mar
Attendance: 10,484
Referee: Gottfried Dienst (Switzerland)

Brazil
Mexico

GK	1	Gilmar
RB	2	Djalma Santos
CB	3	Mauro Ramos (c)
CB	5	Zózimo
LB	6	Nílton Santos
RH	4	Zito
LH	8	Didi
OR	7	Garrincha
CF	10	Pelé
CF	19	Vavá
OL	21	Mário Zagallo
Manager:
Aymoré Moreira

GK	1	Antonio Carbajal (c)
RB	2	Jesús del Muro
CB	5	Raúl Cárdenas
CB	3	Guillermo Sepúlveda
LB	4	José Villegas
RH	19	Antonio Jasso
LH	6	Pedro Nájera
OR	7	Alfredo del Águila
IR	8	Salvador Reyes
IL	9	Héctor Hernández
OL	11	Isidoro Díaz
Manager:
Ignacio Trelles

=== Czechoslovakia vs Spain ===
Spain took the initiative but only managed to create danger in disorganized attacks. Spanish players repelled the harshness of the Czechs with the same violence. That fact provoked the snub of spectators who soon leaned in favour of Czechoslovakia. The injuries of Rivilla and Reija, the two defensive sides, made things worse for Spain. The Czechs seemed to settle for the draw but in 10 minutes' time a mistake from the centre of the Spanish field allowed Josef Štibrányi to face Carmelo's goal and score. The Spanish team weighed down by the injuries managed to create very little danger in the last minutes of the match.

31 May 1962
15:00 CLT (UTC-04)

Czechoslovakia	1–0	Spain
Štibrányi 80'

Estadio Sausalito, Viña del Mar
Attendance: 12,700
Referee: Carl Erich Steiner (Austria)

Czechoslovakia
Spain

GK	1	Viliam Schrojf
RB	2	Jan Lála
CB	5	Svatopluk Pluskal
CB	3	Ján Popluhár
LB	4	Ladislav Novák (c)
RH	19	Andrej Kvašňák
LH	6	Josef Masopust
OR	7	Jozef Štibrányi
IR	8	Adolf Scherer
IL	10	Jozef Adamec
OL	11	Josef Jelínek
Manager:
Rudolf Vytlačil

GK	3	Carmelo
RB	11	Feliciano Rivilla
CB	19	José Santamaría
LB	16	Severino Reija
RH	20	Joan Segarra (c)
LH	8	Jesús Garay
OR	5	Luis del Sol
IR	15	Eulogio Martínez
CF	14	Ferenc Puskás
IL	21	Luis Suárez
OL	9	Francisco Gento
Manager:
(Argentina) Helenio Herrera

=== Brazil vs Czechoslovakia ===
Brazil had to play part of the game with ten players after Pelé tore a thigh muscle midway through the first half. Neither side could break the deadlock and the game ended in 0–0 draw. The two sides would meet again in the final.

2 June 1962
15:00 CLT (UTC-04)

Brazil	0–0	Czechoslovakia

Estadio Sausalito, Viña del Mar
Attendance: 14,903
Referee: Pierre Schwinte (France)

Brazil
Czechoslovakia

GK	1	Gilmar
RB	2	Djalma Santos
CB	3	Mauro Ramos (c)
CB	5	Zózimo
LB	6	Nílton Santos
RH	8	Didi
LH	4	Zito
OR	7	Garrincha
CF	10	Pelé
CF	19	Vavá
OL	21	Mário Zagallo
Manager:
Aymoré Moreira

GK	1	Viliam Schrojf
RB	2	Jan Lála
CB	5	Svatopluk Pluskal
CB	3	Ján Popluhár
LB	4	Ladislav Novák (c)
RH	19	Andrej Kvašňák
LH	6	Josef Masopust
OR	7	Jozef Štibrányi
IR	8	Adolf Scherer
IL	10	Jozef Adamec
OL	11	Josef Jelínek
Manager:
Rudolf Vytlačil

=== Spain vs Mexico ===
The game had very little rhythm and Spanish attacks were lost or easily stopped by the Aztec defense or goalkeeper Carbajal. In the second half physical spending began to take its toll on Spain and Mexico took attack positions. However, in one of counterattacks Luis Suárez and Puskás scored a goal which was cancelled for offside. In the last minutes of the game Mexicans claimed a penalty in the Spanish area. The game continued and the ball reached Gento who made a run on the left wing. Gento passed in to Peiró who finished past Carbajal a few seconds from the final whistle. Spain achieves victory, Santamaría, Pachín and Peiró were named the best men of the Spanish side according to the press.

3 June 1962
15:00 CLT (UTC-04)

Spain	1–0	Mexico
Peiró 90'

Estadio Sausalito, Viña del Mar
Attendance: 11,875
Referee: Branko Tesanić (Yugoslavia)

Spain
Mexico

GK	3	Carmelo
RB	17	Rodri
CB	19	José Santamaría
LB	10	Sígfrid Gràcia
RH	22	Martí Vergés
LH	13	Pachín
OR	5	Luis del Sol
IR	12	Joaquín Peiró
CF	14	Ferenc Puskás
IL	21	Luis Suárez
OL	9	Francisco Gento (c)
Manager:
(Argentina) Helenio Herrera

GK	1	Antonio Carbajal (c)
RB	2	Jesús del Muro
CB	5	Raúl Cárdenas
CB	3	Guillermo Sepúlveda
LB	15	Ignacio Jáuregui
RH	19	Antonio Jasso
LH	6	Pedro Nájera
OR	7	Alfredo del Águila
IR	8	Salvador Reyes
IL	9	Héctor Hernández
OL	11	Isidoro Díaz
Manager:
Ignacio Trelles

=== Brazil vs Spain ===
Spain had control of the game in the first half and took the lead 10 minutes before halftime when Adelardo shot into the bottom corner from twenty meters. At the beginning of the second half Nílton Santos committed a foul inside the penalty area but the referee being far away from the episode awarded only a free kick to the Spanish team. Spain also had a goal disallowed for no evident reason. In the last 15 minutes of the game Amarildo (who was replacing Pele after the latter was injured in the previous match) scored twice to complete the Brazilian comeback.

6 June 1962
15:00 CLT (UTC-04)

Brazil	2–1	Spain
Amarildo 72', 86'		Adelardo 35'

Estadio Sausalito, Viña del Mar
Attendance: 18,715
Referee: Sergio Bustamante (Chile)

Brazil
Spain

GK	1	Gilmar
RB	2	Djalma Santos
CB	3	Mauro Ramos (c)
CB	5	Zózimo
LB	6	Nílton Santos
RH	4	Zito
LH	8	Didi
OR	7	Garrincha
CF	19	Vavá
CF	20	Amarildo
OL	21	Mário Zagallo
Manager:
Aymoré Moreira

GK	1	José Araquistáin
RB	17	Rodri
CB	7	Luis María Echeberría
LB	10	Sígfrid Gràcia
RH	22	Martí Vergés
LH	13	Pachín
OR	4	Enrique Collar (c)
IR	12	Joaquín Peiró
CF	14	Ferenc Puskás
IL	18	Adelardo
OL	9	Francisco Gento
Manager:
(Argentina) Helenio Herrera

=== Mexico vs Czechoslovakia ===
In this game Václav Mašek scored the second fastest goal in the history of the tournament after only 15 seconds. Isidoro Díaz equalized after sweeping past two defenders, Alfredo del Águila made it 2–1 before half time. In the second half Mexicans secured their first World Cup victory with a late penalty converted by Héctor Hernández. Mašek's record would be beaten 40 years later by Turkish footballer Hakan Şükür, after only 10 seconds.

7 June 1962
15:00 CLT (UTC-04)

Mexico	3–1	Czechoslovakia
Díaz 12'; Del Águila 29'; Hernández 90' (pen.)		Mašek 1'

Estadio Sausalito, Viña del Mar
Attendance: 10,648
Referee: Gottfried Dienst (Switzerland)

Mexico
Czechoslovakia

GK	1	Antonio Carbajal (c)
RB	2	Jesús del Muro
CB	5	Raúl Cárdenas
CB	3	Guillermo Sepúlveda
LB	15	Ignacio Jáuregui
RH	8	Salvador Reyes
LH	6	Pedro Nájera
OR	7	Alfredo del Águila
IR	18	Alfredo Hernández
IL	9	Héctor Hernández
OL	11	Isidoro Díaz
Manager:
Ignacio Trelles

GK	1	Viliam Schrojf
RB	2	Jan Lála
CB	5	Svatopluk Pluskal
CB	3	Ján Popluhár
LB	4	Ladislav Novák (c)
RH	19	Andrej Kvašňák
LH	6	Josef Masopust
OR	7	Jozef Štibrányi
IR	8	Adolf Scherer
IL	10	Jozef Adamec
OL	14	Václav Mašek
Manager:
Rudolf Vytlačil

== See also ==
- Brazil at the FIFA World Cup
- Czech Republic at the FIFA World Cup
- Mexico at the FIFA World Cup
- Slovakia at the FIFA World Cup
- Spain at the FIFA World Cup
