= 1962 FIFA World Cup final =

World Cup final, held in Chile

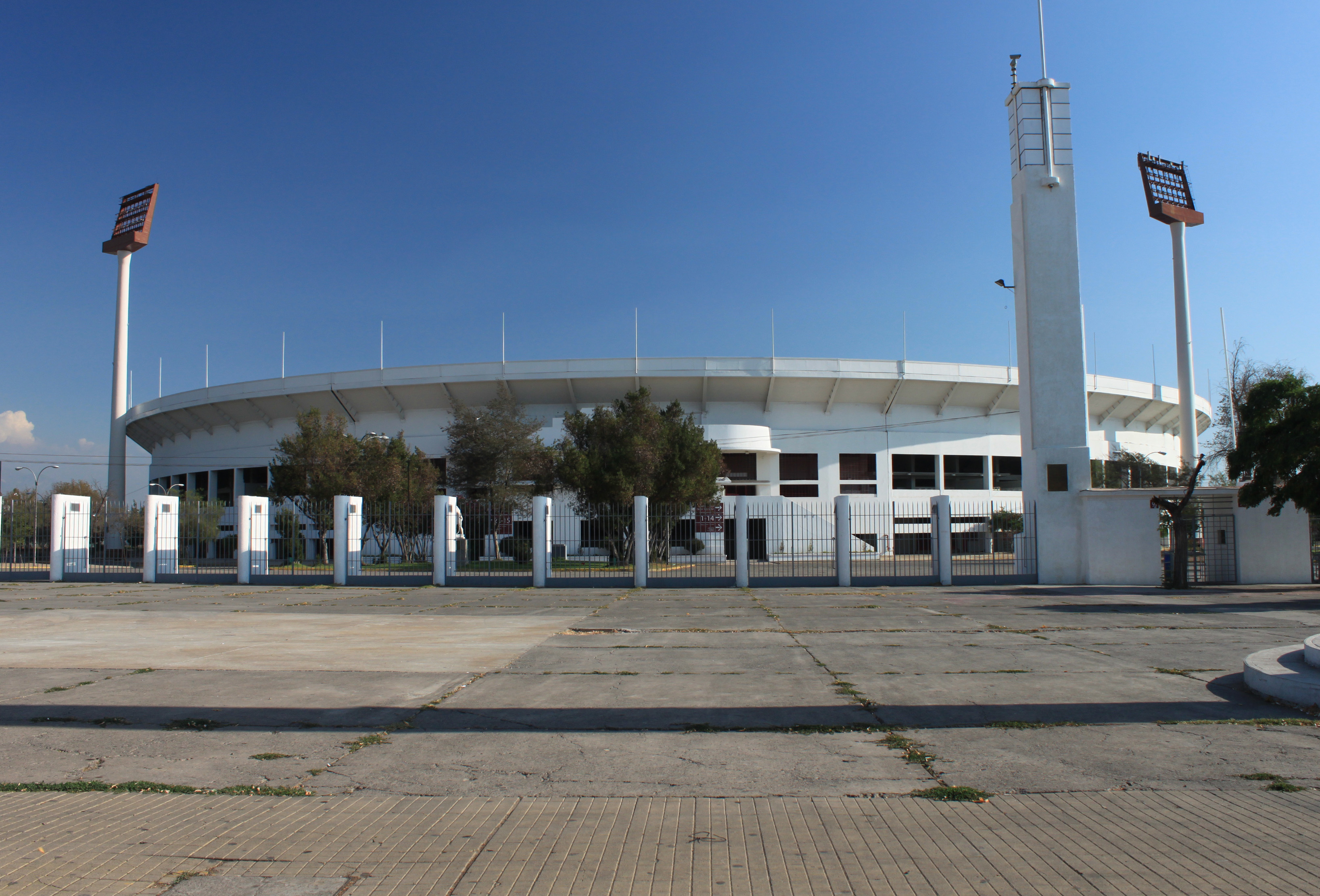
- The Estadio Nacional de Chile held the final
- Event: 1962 FIFA World Cup
Brazil	Czechoslovakia
3	1
- Date: 17 June 1962
- Venue: Estadio Nacional, Santiago
- Referee: Nikolay Latyshev (Soviet Union)
- Attendance: 68,679

The final match of the 1962 FIFA World Cup, the seventh edition of FIFA's quadrennial competition for men's national teams, was played at Estadio Nacional in Santiago, Chile, on 17 June 1962, and was contested by defending champions Brazil and Czechoslovakia.

The tournament included host Chile, holders Brazil, and fourteen other teams who emerged from the qualification rounds organized by the six FIFA confederations. The 16 teams competed in a group stage, from which 8 teams qualified for the knockout stage. En route to the final, both finalists were drawn into Group 3, where they played in a goalless draw. Brazil finished atop the group with wins over Mexico and Spain, before beating England in the quarter-finals and defeating Chile in the semi-finals. Czechoslovakia finished second with a win over Spain and a loss to Mexico before beating Hungary in the quarter-finals and Yugoslavia in the semi-finals.

The final took place in front of 68,679 supporters, and was refereed by Nikolay Latyshev from the Soviet Union. Brazil won the game 3–1 to record their second consecutive World Cup victory. This was the second World Cup final match featuring teams who had already competed against each other during the group stage (the first was the 1954 final between Hungary and West Germany).

== Background ==
The 1962 FIFA World Cup was the seventh edition of the World Cup, FIFA's football competition for men's national teams, held in Chile between 30 May and 17 June 1962. Both Chile and Brazil qualified automatically for the tournament — Chile as hosts and Brazil because they had won the previous World Cup in 1958. The remaining 14 spots were decided through qualifying rounds held between August 1960 and December 1961, organized by the six FIFA confederations and involving 49 teams. In the finals, the teams were divided into four groups of four with each team playing each other once in a round-robin format. The top two teams from each group advanced to the knock-out stage.

Brazil was the reigning World Cup champion, having won the tournament against Sweden in 1958, and had previously placed second in 1950 after losing to Uruguay in the final. They were the bookmakers' favorite, with odds of 3–1 to win the tournament. Czechoslovakia finished as runners-up in 1934, losing 2–1 to Italy in the final. The two teams had previously met 6 times, their first encounter taking place in the quarter-finals of the 1938 World Cup with a 1–1 draw. Before the final, Brazil had won two of those meetings, Czechoslovakia one, with three draws. Their most recent meeting was in the group stages of the 1962 World Cup, which ended in a 0–0 draw.

A year before the tournament, Brazil's manager Vicente Feola resigned due to health issues and was replaced by Aymoré Moreira. Moreira made two changes to their 1958 lineup, with Zózimo replacing centre-back Orlando Peçanha, and defender Mauro Ramos took Hilderaldo Bellini's position as captain. Brazil adopted a 4–3–3 formation.

== Route to the final ==
=== Brazil ===
Brazil's route to the final
	Opponent	Result
1	Mexico	2–0
2	Czechoslovakia	0–0
3	Spain	2–1
QF	England	3–1
SF	Chile	4–2

Having automatically qualified for the tournament as defending champions, Brazil was placed in Group 3 at the World Cup, alongside Mexico, Spain, and Czechoslovakia. Their first group game was against Mexico at Sausalito Stadium in Viña del Mar on 30 May. After a goalless first half, Brazil took the lead in the 56th minute through Mário Zagallo, who scored with a header from a Pelé cross. Pelé then ran through the Mexican defense and scored with a left-footed shot from the edge of the penalty area to seal Brazil a 2–0 win. In their next group game, Brazil faced eventual finalists Czechoslovakia at Sausalito Stadium on 2 June. Brazil dominated the first half and had several chances, notably from Pelé, who had two goal-scoring shots saved by goalkeeper Viliam Schrojf. However, Pelé sustained an injury after hitting a long-range shot that ruled him out of the tournament. Czechoslovakia was dominant early in the second half, before Brazil regained control of the match. Brazil appealed for a penalty after Garrincha's shot was deflected off Slovak defender Ján Popluhár's hands, but it was declined by the referee. The match ended in a goalless draw, but was viewed as a victory by some Brazilians. Their final group game was against Spain at Sausalito Stadium on 6 June. In the 35th minute, Ferenc Puskás received the ball just out of the penalty area and crossed to Adelardo Rodríguez, whose shot beat goalkeeper Gilmar and went into the top corner to give Spain the lead. With nineteen minutes remaining, Amarildo received Mário Zagallo's pass and equalized the score 1–1. He then added his second goal from Garrincha's cross to give Brazil a 2–1 victory. Brazil finished atop the group with five points.

In the quarter-finals, Brazil played England at Sausalito Stadium on 10 June. Garrincha gave Brazil the lead from a Zagallo corner in the 31th minute. Seven minutes later, Gerry Hitchens equalized the level, scoring from a rebound after Jimmy Greaves's header had struck the Brazilian goalpost. In the 53rd minute, Vavá restored Brazil's lead when he headed the rebound in after Garrincha's free kick was saved by goalkeeper Ron Springett. Garrincha struck again six minutes later, this time with a driven right-footed shot from 25 yards (22 m) to ensure Brazil a 3–1 victory. Brazil's opponents in the semi-finals were hosts Chile at the Estadio Nacional Julio Martínez Prádanos in Santiago on 13 June. Both sides exchanged early chances from Didi and Leonel Sánchez, respectively. Brazil took the lead in the ninth minute when Zagallo crossed the ball to Garrincha, who scored into the top corner of the Chilean goal. In the 30th minute, Garrincha headed the ball in from a Zagallo corner to double their lead. Eleven minutes later, Jorge Toro converted a free kick from 25 yards (22 m) to make the score 2–1. Two minutes into the second half, Vavá scored with a header from a Garrincha corner to give Brazil a 3–1 lead. In the 62nd minute, Leonel Sánchez struck a penalty into the bottom corner to reduce their deficit once again to 3–2. Chile had multiple chances to equalize afterwards, but Vavá headed a long ball from Zagallo's pass in the 78th minute to score Brazil's fourth goal. Chile's Honorino Landa and Garrincha were sent off, respectively, for having a disrespectful attitude toward the referee and for kicking midfielder Eladio Rojas. Brazil held on to a 4–2 victory and progressed to the final.

=== Czechoslovakia ===
Czechoslovakia's route to the final
	Opponent	Result
1	Spain	1–0
2	Brazil	0–0
3	Mexico	1–3
QF	Hungary	1–0
SF	Yugoslavia	3–1

Czechoslovakia qualified for the tournament after winning a play-off against Scotland, after both finished level on points in their qualifying group. Their first group game was against Spain at Sausalito Stadium on 31 May. Josef Jelínek had a chance to put Czechoslovakia ahead, but his shot went wide. Spain's players had multiple chances to score as well, but their shots were saved by Schrojf, and the first half ended goalless. In the second half, Josef Masopust sent a curling shot to Jozef Štibrányi, who went one-on-one with the goalkeeper Carmelo Cedrún and chipped the ball over him to score the only goal of the game. After drawing with Brazil in their next game, Czechoslovakia faced Mexico in their final group match at Sausalito Stadium on 7 June. Václav Mašek opened the scoring for Czechoslovakia after 15 seconds, scoring into the right corner with a low shot from Josef Masopust's pass. It was the fastest goal ever scored in the tournament's history until Hakan Şükür's goal in 2002. Twelve minutes later, Isidoro Díaz scored Mexico's equalizer from a Héctor Hernández pass. In the 29th minute, Alfredo del Águila put Mexico ahead after an error from Masopust, who lost possession while trying to dribble past him. Late in the second half, Héctor Hernández converted a penalty to give Mexico a 3–1 victory. Nevertheless, before their final match, Czechoslovakia qualified for the quarter-finals as a result of Brazil's win over Spain. They finished second in their group with three points.

In the quarter-finals, Czechoslovakia took on Hungary at Estadio El Teniente in Rancagua on 10 June. Hungary created several early goal-scoring chances before Czechoslovakia took the lead in the 13th minute when Adolf Scherer received a through-ball from Masopust and scored the only goal of the match. Czechoslovakia faced Yugoslavia in their semi-final match at Sausalito Stadium on 13 June. Yugoslavia had two goal-scoring chances from Vasilije Šijaković, who missed a rebound, and Dragoslav Šekularac, whose shot was saved by Schrojf. Tomáš Pospíchal had an opportunity to score but lost possession of the ball, and the first half ended goalless. Four minutes into the second half, Czechoslovakia took the lead through Josef Kadraba, scoring into the top corner from a Pospíchal pass. In the 69th minute, Dražan Jerković capitalized on a mistake by Schroif and scored with a header to equalize the score. Eleven minutes later, Scherer received a pass from Kadraba and scored from 10 yards (9 m) to put Czechoslovakia ahead. Scherer then converted a penalty in the 84th minute to ensure a 3–1 win for Czechoslovakia.

== Match ==
=== Summary ===
Brazil won the coin toss and kicked off the match. In the third minute, Adolf Scherer played a cross to Josef Masopust, whose shot went over the crossbar. Brazil then launched an attack when Zito took a shot from 32 yards (30 m) that went wide of the goal. Two minutes later, Vavá had a chance to score from 3 yards (3.2 m) when he received a cross from Garrincha, but his shot went past the right goalpost. In the ninth minute, Vavá struck a weak shot following a pass from Amarildo, which was saved by Viliam Schrojf. Didi then sent a pass to Vavá, who took a goal-bound shot, but it went into Schrojf's hands.

=== Details ===
17 June 1962
14:30 CLT (UTC-04)

Brazil	3–1	Czechoslovakia
Amarildo 17'; Zito 69'; Vavá 78'		Masopust 15'

Estadio Nacional, Santiago
Attendance: 68,679
Referee: Nikolay Latyshev (Soviet Union)

Brazil	Czechoslovakia

GK	1	Gilmar
RB	2	Djalma Santos
CB	3	Mauro Ramos (c)
CB	5	Zózimo
LB	6	Nílton Santos
RH	4	Zito
LH	8	Didi
OR	7	Garrincha
OL	21	Mário Zagallo
CF	19	Vavá
CF	20	Amarildo
Manager:
Aymoré Moreira

GK	1	Viliam Schrojf
RB	12	Jiří Tichý
CB	5	Svatopluk Pluskal
CB	3	Ján Popluhár
LB	4	Ladislav Novák (c)
RH	19	Andrej Kvašňák
LH	6	Josef Masopust
OR	17	Tomáš Pospíchal
IR	8	Adolf Scherer
IL	18	Josef Kadraba
OL	11	Josef Jelínek
Manager:
Rudolf Vytlačil

Assistant referees:
Leo Horn (Netherlands)
Bobby Davidson (Scotland)

Match rules

- 90 minutes.
- 30 minutes of extra time if necessary.
- Replay if scores still level.
- No substitutions permitted.

== See also ==
- Brazil at the FIFA World Cup
- Czech Republic at the FIFA World Cup
- Slovakia at the FIFA World Cup
