= Mexico at the FIFA World Cup =

International football delegation

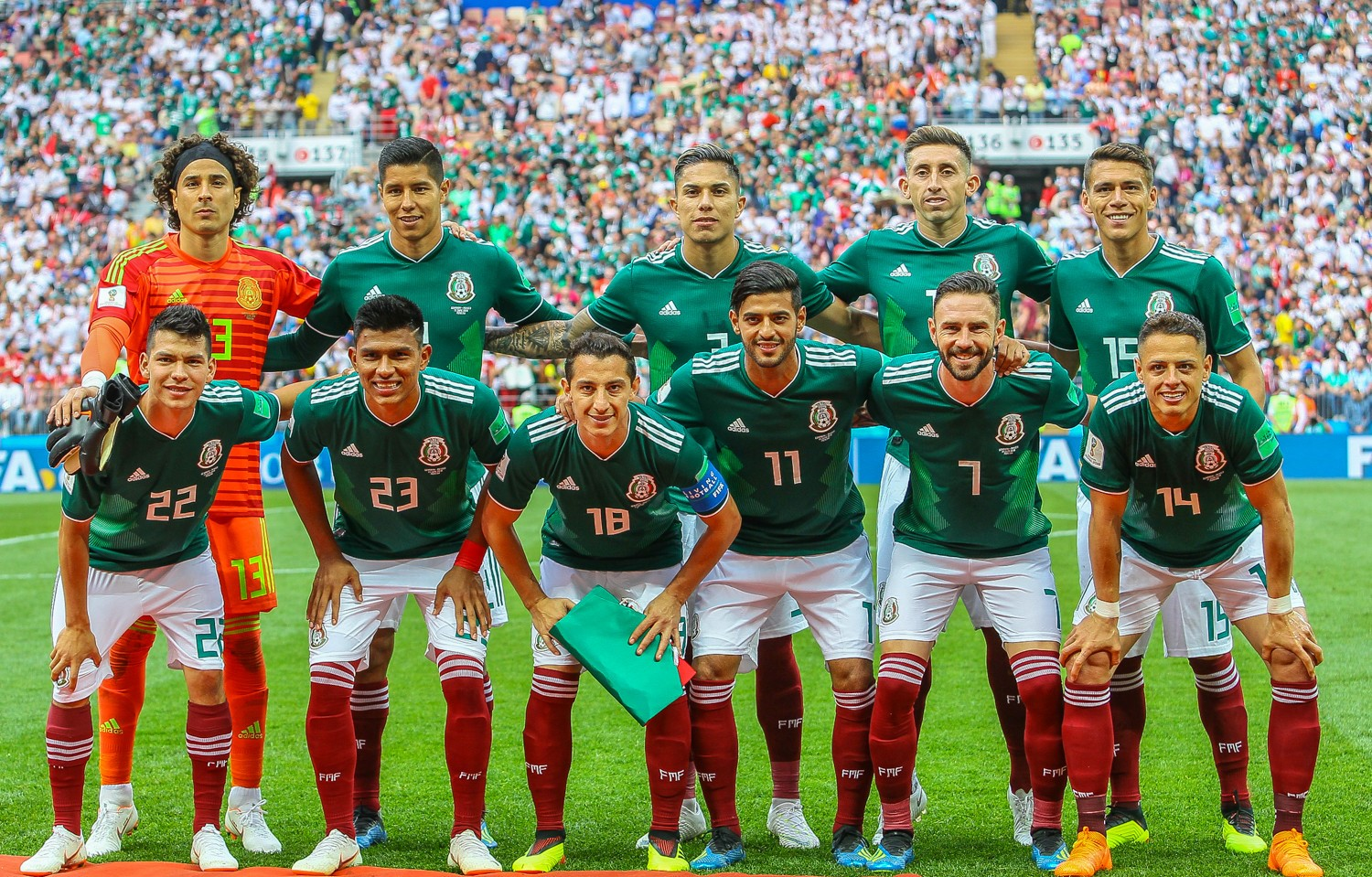
Mexico national team at the 2018 FIFA World Cup in Russia

This is a record of the results of the Mexico national football team at the FIFA World Cup. The World Cup is the premier competitive international football tournament, first played in 1930, and then every four years since, except 1942 and 1946, due to World War II.

Mexico has competed in the tournament since the inaugural 1930 World Cup, and has entered ever since, for a total of 18 tournaments, although they failed to qualify for the finals proper on three occasions: 1934 (Italy), 1974 (West Germany), and 1982 (Spain). In addition, it withdrew from the finals in 1938 (France), and was banned by FIFA from entering the 1990 World Cup (Italy) after fielding over-aged players during the 1988 Olympic Games qualifiers, which was a youth tournament.

The tournament consists of two parts, the qualification phase and the final phase (officially called the World Cup Finals). The qualification phase, which currently take place over the three years preceding the Finals, is used to determine which teams qualify for the Finals. The current format of the Finals involves 48 teams competing for the title, at venues within the host nation (or nations) over a period of about a month. The World Cup final is the most widely viewed sporting event in the world, with an estimated 715.1 million people watching the 2006 tournament final.

Since they finished in the quarter-finals in 1986, Mexico have failed to advance beyond the round of 16 in subsequent editions.

== Overall record ==
FIFA World Cup record
Year	Round	Position	Pld	W	D	L	GF	GA
(Uruguay) 1930	Group stage	13th	3	0	0	3	4	13
(Italy) 1934	Did not qualify							
(France) 1938	Withdrew							
(Brazil) 1950	Group stage	12th	3	0	0	3	2	10
(Switzerland) 1954	Group stage	13th	2	0	0	2	2	8
(Sweden) 1958	Group stage	16th	3	0	1	2	1	8
(Chile) 1962	Group stage	11th	3	1	0	2	3	4
(England) 1966	Group stage	12th	3	0	2	1	1	3
(Mexico) 1970	Quarter-finals	6th	4	2	1	1	6	4
(West Germany) 1974	Did not qualify							
(Argentina) 1978	Group stage	16th	3	0	0	3	2	12
(Spain) 1982	Did not qualify							
(Mexico) 1986	Quarter-finals	6th	5	3	2	0	6	2
(Italy) 1990	Banned							
(United States) 1994	Round of 16	13th	4	1	2	1	4	4
(France) 1998	Round of 16	13th	4	1	2	1	8	7
(South Korea) (Japan) 2002	Round of 16	11th	4	2	1	1	4	4
(Germany) 2006	Round of 16	15th	4	1	1	2	5	5
(South Africa) 2010	Round of 16	14th	4	1	1	2	4	5
(Brazil) 2014	Round of 16	10th	4	2	1	1	5	3
(Russia) 2018	Round of 16	12th	4	2	0	2	3	6
(Qatar) 2022	Group stage	22nd	3	1	1	1	2	3
(Canada) (Mexico) (United States) 2026	Round of 16	9th	5	4	0	1	10	3
(Morocco) (Portugal) (Spain) 2030	To be determined							
(Saudi Arabia) 2034	To be determined							
Total	Quarter-finals	6th	65	21	15	29	72	104

Mexico's World Cup record
First Match	Mexico 1–4 France (13 July 1930; Montevideo, Uruguay)
Biggest Win	Mexico 4–0 El Salvador (7 June 1970; Mexico City, Mexico)
Biggest Defeat	West Germany 6–0 Mexico (6 June 1978; Cordoba, Argentina)
Best Result	Quarter-finals in 1970 and 1986
Worst Result	Group stage in 1930, 1950, 1954, 1958, 1962, 1966, 1978 and 2022

== List of matches ==
World Cup	Round	Opponent	Score	Mexico scorers
(Uruguay) 1930	Group 1	France	1–4	Carreño
(Uruguay) 1930	Group 1	Chile	0–3	
(Uruguay) 1930	Group 1	Argentina	3–6	Manuel Rosas (2), Gayón
(Brazil) 1950	Group 1	Brazil	0–4	
(Brazil) 1950	Group 1	Yugoslavia	1–4	Héctor Ortiz
(Brazil) 1950	Group 1	Switzerland	1–2	Casarín
(Switzerland) 1954	Group 1	Brazil	0–5	
(Switzerland) 1954	Group 1	France	2–3	Lamadrid, Balcázar
(Sweden) 1958	Group 3	Sweden	0–3	
(Sweden) 1958	Group 3	Wales	1–1	Belmonte
(Sweden) 1958	Group 3	Hungary	0–4	
(Chile) 1962	Group 3	Brazil	0–2	
(Chile) 1962	Group 3	Spain	0–1	
(Chile) 1962	Group 3	Czechoslovakia	3–1	Díaz, del Águila, Hernández
(England) 1966	Group 1	France	1–1	Borja
(England) 1966	Group 1	England	0–2	
(England) 1966	Group 1	Uruguay	0–0	
(Mexico) 1970	Group 1	Soviet Union	0–0	
(Mexico) 1970	Group 1	El Salvador	4–0	Valdivia (2), Fragoso, Basaguren
(Mexico) 1970	Group 1	Belgium	1–0	Peña
(Mexico) 1970	Quarter-final	Italy	1–4	González
(Argentina) 1978	Group 2	Tunisia	1–3	Vázquez Ayala
(Argentina) 1978	Group 2	West Germany	0–6	
(Argentina) 1978	Group 2	Poland	1–3	Rangel
(Mexico) 1986	Group B	Belgium	2–1	Quirarte, Hugo Sánchez
(Mexico) 1986	Group B	Paraguay	1–1	Luis Flores
(Mexico) 1986	Group B	Iraq	1–0	Quirarte
(Mexico) 1986	Round of 16	Bulgaria	2–0	Negrete, Servín
(Mexico) 1986	Quarter-final	West Germany	0–0 (a.e.t.) (1–4 p)	
(United States) 1994	Group E	Norway	0–1	
(United States) 1994	Group E	Republic of Ireland	2–1	García (2)
(United States) 1994	Group E	Italy	1–1	Bernal
(United States) 1994	Round of 16	Bulgaria	1–1 (a.e.t.) (1–3 p)	García Aspe
(France) 1998	Group E	South Korea	3–1	Peláez, Hernández (2)
(France) 1998	Group E	Belgium	2–2	García Aspe, Blanco
(France) 1998	Group E	Netherlands	2–2	Peláez, Hernández
(France) 1998	Round of 16	Germany	1–2	Hernández
(South Korea) (Japan) 2002	Group G	Croatia	1–0	Blanco
(South Korea) (Japan) 2002	Group G	Ecuador	2–1	Borgetti, Torrado
(South Korea) (Japan) 2002	Group G	Italy	1–1	Borgetti
(South Korea) (Japan) 2002	Round of 16	United States	0–2	
(Germany) 2006	Group D	Iran	3–1	Bravo (2), Zinha
(Germany) 2006	Group D	Angola	0–0	
(Germany) 2006	Group D	Portugal	1–2	Fonseca
(Germany) 2006	Round of 16	Argentina	1–2 (a.e.t.)	Márquez
(South Africa) 2010	Group A	South Africa	1–1	Márquez
(South Africa) 2010	Group A	France	2–0	Javier Hernández, Blanco
(South Africa) 2010	Group A	Uruguay	0–1	
(South Africa) 2010	Round of 16	Argentina	1–3	Javier Hernández
(Brazil) 2014	Group A	Cameroon	1–0	Peralta
(Brazil) 2014	Group A	Brazil	0–0	
(Brazil) 2014	Group A	Croatia	3–1	Márquez, Guardado, Javier Hernández
(Brazil) 2014	Round of 16	Netherlands	1–2	G. dos Santos
(Russia) 2018	Group F	Germany	1–0	Lozano
(Russia) 2018	Group F	South Korea	2–1	Vela, Javier Hernández
(Russia) 2018	Group F	Sweden	0–3	
(Russia) 2018	Round of 16	Brazil	0–2	
(Qatar) 2022	Group C	Poland	0–0	
(Qatar) 2022	Group C	Argentina	0–2	
(Qatar) 2022	Group C	Saudi Arabia	2–1	Martín, Chávez
(Canada) (Mexico) (United States) 2026	Group A	South Africa	2–0	Quiñones, Jiménez
(Canada) (Mexico) (United States) 2026	Group A	South Korea	1–0	Romo
(Canada) (Mexico) (United States) 2026	Group A	Czech Republic	3–0	Chávez, Quiñones, Fidalgo
(Canada) (Mexico) (United States) 2026	Round of 32	Ecuador	2–0	Quiñones, Jiménez
(Canada) (Mexico) (United States) 2026	Round of 16	England	2–3	Quiñones, Jiménez

=== 1930 FIFA World Cup ===
==== Group Stage ====
Pos	Team	Pld	W	D	L	GF	GA	GD	Pts	Qualification
1	Argentina	3	3	0	0	10	4	+6	6	Advance to the knockout stage
2	Chile	3	2	0	1	5	3	+2	4	
3	France	3	1	0	2	4	3	+1	2	
4	Mexico	3	0	0	3	4	13	−9	0	

Source: ESPN
13 July 1930
15:00 UYT (UTC−03:30)

France	4–1	Mexico
L. Laurent 19'; Langiller 40'; Maschinot 43', 87'		Carreño 70'

Estadio Pocitos, Montevideo
Attendance: 4,444
Referee: Domingo Lombardi (Uruguay)

16 July 1930
14:45 UYT (UTC−03:30)

Chile	3–0	Mexico
Vidal 3', 65' (Note: This is one of several goals for which the statistical details are disputed. The goalscorers and timings used here are those of FIFA, the official record. Some other sources, such as RSSSF, state a different scorer, timing, or both.); M. Rosas 52' (o.g.)

Estadio Parque Central, Montevideo
Attendance: 9,249
Referee: Henri Christophe (Belgium)

19 July 1930
15:00 UYT (UTC−03:30)

Argentina	6–3	Mexico
Stábile 8', 17', 80'; Zumelzú 12', 55'; Varallo 53'		M. Rosas 42' (pen.), 65'; Gayón 75'

Estadio Centenario, Montevideo
Attendance: 42,100
Referee: Ulises Saucedo (Bolivia)

=== 1950 FIFA World Cup ===
==== Group Stage ====
Pos	Team	Pld	W	D	L	GF	GA	GD	Pts	Qualification
1	Brazil	3	2	1	0	8	2	+6	5	Advance to final round
2	Yugoslavia	3	2	0	1	7	3	+4	4	
3	Switzerland	3	1	1	1	4	6	−2	3	
4	Mexico	3	0	0	3	2	10	−8	0	

Source: FIFA
24 June 1950
15:00 BRT (UTC-3)

Brazil	4–0	Mexico
Ademir 30', 79'; Jair 65'; Baltazar 71'

Estádio do Maracanã, Rio de Janeiro
Attendance: 81,649
Referee: George Reader (England)

28 June 1950
15:00 BRT (UTC-3)

Yugoslavia	4–1	Mexico
Bobek 20'; Ž. Čajkovski 23', 51'; Tomašević 81'		Ortiz 89' (pen.)

Estádio dos Eucaliptos, Porto Alegre
Attendance: 11,078
Referee: Reginald Leafe (England)

2 July 1950
15:40 BRT (UTC-3)

Switzerland	2–1	Mexico
Bader 10'; Antenen 44'		Casarín 89'

Estádio dos Eucaliptos, Porto Alegre
Attendance: 3,580
Referee: Ivan Eklind (Sweden)

=== 1954 FIFA World Cup ===
==== Group Stage ====
Pos	Team	Pld	W	D	L	GF	GA	GD	Pts	Qualification
1	Brazil	2	1	1	0	6	1	+5	3	Advance to the knockout stage
1	Yugoslavia	2	1	1	0	2	1	+1	3	Advance to the knockout stage
3	France	2	1	0	1	3	3	0	2	
4	Mexico	2	0	0	2	2	8	−6	0	

Source: FIFA
16 June 1954
18:00

Brazil	5–0	Mexico
Baltazar 23'; Didi 30'; Pinga 34', 43'; Julinho 69'

Charmilles Stadium, Geneva
Attendance: 13,470
Referee: Raymon Wyssling (Switzerland)

19 June 1954
17:10

France	3–2	Mexico
Vincent 19'; Cárdenas 46' (o.g.); Kopa 88' (pen.)		Lamadrid 54'; Balcázar 85'

Charmilles Stadium, Geneva
Attendance: 19,000
Referee: Manuel Asensi (Spain)

=== 1958 FIFA World Cup ===
==== Group Stage ====
Pos	Team	Pld	W	D	L	GF	GA	GR	Pts	Qualification
1	Sweden	3	2	1	0	5	1	5.000	5	Advance to knockout stage
2	Wales	3	0	3	0	2	2	1.000	3 (Note: Wales finished ahead of Hungary by winning a play-off.)	Advance to knockout stage
3	Hungary	3	1	1	1	6	3	2.000	3	
4	Mexico	3	0	1	2	1	8	0.125	1	

Source: FIFA
Notes:
8 June 1958
14:00 (CET)

Sweden	3–0	Mexico
Simonsson 17', 64'; Liedholm 57' (pen.)

Råsunda Stadium, Solna
Attendance: 34,107
Referee: Nikolay Latyshev (Soviet Union)

11 June 1958
19:00 (CET)

Mexico	1–1	Wales
Belmonte 89'		I. Allchurch 32'

Råsunda Stadium, Solna
Attendance: 15,150
Referee: Leo Lemesic (Yugoslavia)

15 June 1958
19:00 (CET)

Hungary	4–0	Mexico
Tichy 19', 46'; Sándor 54'; Bencsics 69'

Jernvallen, Sandviken
Attendance: 13,300
Referee: Arne Eriksson (Finland)

=== 1962 FIFA World Cup ===
==== Group Stage ====
Pos	Team	Pld	W	D	L	GF	GA	GR	Pts	Qualification
1	Brazil	3	2	1	0	4	1	4.000	5	Advance to knockout stage
2	Czechoslovakia	3	1	1	1	2	3	0.667	3	Advance to knockout stage
3	Mexico	3	1	0	2	3	4	0.750	2 (Note: Mexico finished ahead of Spain on goal average.)	
4	Spain	3	1	0	2	2	3	0.667	2	

Source: FIFA
Notes:
30 May 1962
15:00 CLT (UTC-04)

Brazil	2–0	Mexico
Zagallo 56'; Pelé 73'

Estadio Sausalito, Viña del Mar
Attendance: 10,484
Referee: Gottfried Dienst (Switzerland)

3 June 1962
15:00 CLT (UTC-04)

Spain	1–0	Mexico
Peiró 90'

Estadio Sausalito, Viña del Mar
Attendance: 11,875
Referee: Branko Tesanić (Yugoslavia)

7 June 1962
15:00 CLT (UTC-04)

Mexico	3–1	Czechoslovakia
Díaz 12'; Del Águila 29'; Hernández 90' (pen.)		Mašek 1'

Estadio Sausalito, Viña del Mar
Attendance: 10,648
Referee: Gottfried Dienst (Switzerland)

=== 1966 FIFA World Cup ===
==== Group Stage ====
Pos	Team	Pld	W	D	L	GF	GA	GR	Pts	Qualification
1	England	3	2	1	0	4	0	—	5	Advance to knockout stage
2	Uruguay	3	1	2	0	2	1	2.000	4	Advance to knockout stage
3	Mexico	3	0	2	1	1	3	0.333	2	
4	France	3	0	1	2	2	5	0.400	1	

Source: FIFA
13 July 1966
19:30 BST

France	1–1	Mexico
Hausser 62'		Borja 48'

Wembley Stadium, London
Attendance: 69,237
Referee: Menachem Ashkenazi (Israel)

16 July 1966
19:30 BST

England	2–0	Mexico
B. Charlton 37'; Hunt 75'

Wembley Stadium, London
Attendance: 92,570
Referee: Concetto Lo Bello (Italy)

19 July 1966
16:30 BST

Mexico	0–0	Uruguay

Wembley Stadium, London
Attendance: 61,112
Referee: Bertil Lööw (Sweden)

=== 1970 FIFA World Cup ===
==== Group Stage ====
Pos	Team	Pld	W	D	L	GF	GA	GD	Pts	Qualification
1	Soviet Union	3	2	1	0	6	1	+5	5 (Note: Having finished level on both points and goal difference, the Soviet Union and Mexico were separated by the drawing of lots.)	Advance to knockout stage
2	Mexico	3	2	1	0	5	0	+5	5	Advance to knockout stage
3	Belgium	3	1	0	2	4	5	−1	2	
4	El Salvador	3	0	0	3	0	9	−9	0	

Source: FIFA
Notes:
31 May 1970
12:00

Mexico	0–0	Soviet Union

Estadio Azteca, Mexico City
Attendance: 107,160
Referee: Kurt Tschenscher (West Germany)

7 June 1970
12:00

Mexico	4–0	El Salvador
Valdivia 45', 46'; Fragoso 58'; Basaguren 83'

Estadio Azteca, Mexico City
Attendance: 103,058
Referee: Ali Kandil (United Arab Republic)

11 June 1970
16:00

Mexico	1–0	Belgium
Peña 14' (pen.)

Estadio Azteca, Mexico City
Attendance: 108,192
Referee: Ángel Norberto Coerezza (Argentina)

==== Knockout stage ====
Quarter-finals

14 June 1970
12:00

Italy	4–1	Mexico
Guzmán 25' (o.g.); Riva 63', 76'; Rivera 70'		González 13'

Estadio Luis Dosal, Toluca
Attendance: 26,851
Referee: Rudolf Scheurer (Switzerland)

=== 1978 FIFA World Cup ===
==== First group stage ====
Pos	Team	Pld	W	D	L	GF	GA	GD	Pts	Qualification
1	Poland	3	2	1	0	4	1	+3	5	Advance to second round
2	West Germany	3	1	2	0	6	0	+6	4	Advance to second round
3	Tunisia	3	1	1	1	3	2	+1	3	
4	Mexico	3	0	0	3	2	12	−10	0	

Source: FIFA
2 June 1978
16:45 ART

Tunisia	3–1	Mexico
Kaabi 55'; Ghommidh 79'; Dhouieb 87'		Vázquez Ayala 45' (pen.)

Estadio Gigante de Arroyito, Rosario
Attendance: 17,396
Referee: John Gordon (Scotland)

6 June 1978
16:45 ART

West Germany	6–0	Mexico
D. Müller 15'; H. Müller 30'; Rummenigge 38', 73'; Flohe 44', 89'

Estadio Chateau Carreras, Córdoba
Attendance: 35,258
Referee: Farouk Bouzo (Syria)

10 June 1978
16:45 ART

Poland	3–1	Mexico
Boniek 43', 84'; Deyna 56'		Rangel 52'

Estadio Gigante de Arroyito, Rosario
Attendance: 22,651
Referee: Jafar Namdar (Iran)

=== 1986 FIFA World Cup ===
==== Group Stage ====
Pos	Team	Pld	W	D	L	GF	GA	GD	Pts	Qualification
1	Mexico (H)	3	2	1	0	4	2	+2	5	Advance to knockout stage
2	Paraguay	3	1	2	0	4	3	+1	4	Advance to knockout stage
3	Belgium	3	1	1	1	5	5	0	3	Advance to knockout stage
4	Iraq	3	0	0	3	1	4	−3	0	

Source: FIFA
(H) Hosts
3 June 1986
12:00 CST

Belgium	1–2	Mexico
Vandenbergh 45'		Quirarte 23'; Sánchez 39'

Estadio Azteca, Mexico City
Attendance: 110,000
Referee: Carlos Espósito (Argentina)

7 June 1986
12:00 CST

Mexico	1–1	Paraguay
Flores 3'		Romerito 85'

Estadio Azteca, Mexico City
Attendance: 114,600
Referee: George Courtney (England)

11 June 1986
12:00 CST

Iraq	0–1	Mexico
		Quirarte 54'

Estadio Azteca, Mexico City
Attendance: 103,763
Referee: Zoran Petrović (Yugoslavia)

==== Knockout stage ====
Round of 16

15 June 1986
12:00 CST

Mexico	2–0	Bulgaria
Negrete 34'; Servín 61'

Estadio Azteca, Mexico City
Attendance: 114,580
Referee: Romualdo Arppi Filho (Brazil)

Quarter-finals

21 June 1986
16:00 CST

West Germany	0–0 (a.e.t.)	Mexico
Penalties
Allofs (penalty scored); Brehme (penalty scored); Matthäus (penalty scored); Littbarski (penalty scored)	4–1	(penalty scored) Negrete; (penalty missed) Quirarte; (penalty missed) Servín

Estadio Universitario, San Nicolás de los Garza
Attendance: 41,700
Referee: Jesús Díaz (Colombia)

=== 1994 FIFA World Cup ===
==== Group Stage ====
Pos	Team	Pld	W	D	L	GF	GA	GD	Pts	Qualification
1	Mexico	3	1	1	1	3	3	0	4	Advance to knockout stage
2	Republic of Ireland	3	1	1	1	2	2	0	4 (Note: Head-to-head result: Italy 0–1 Republic of Ireland.)	Advance to knockout stage
3	Italy	3	1	1	1	2	2	0	4	Advance to knockout stage
4	Norway	3	1	1	1	1	1	0	4	

Source: FIFA
Notes:
June 19, 1994
4:00 p.m. EDT (UTC–4)

Norway	1–0	Mexico
Rekdal 84'

RFK Stadium, Washington, D.C.
Attendance: 52,395
Referee: Sándor Puhl (Hungary)

June 24, 1994
12:30 p.m. EDT (UTC–4)

Mexico	2–1	Republic of Ireland
García 42', 65'		Aldridge 84'

Citrus Bowl, Orlando
Attendance: 60,790
Referee: Kurt Röthlisberger (Switzerland)

June 28, 1994
12:30 p.m. EDT (UTC–4)

Italy	1–1	Mexico
Massaro 48'		Bernal 57'

RFK Stadium, Washington, D.C.
Attendance: 52,535
Referee: Francisco Oscar Lamolina (Argentina)

==== Knockout stage ====
Round of 16

July 5, 1994
4:30 p.m. EDT (UTC–4)

Mexico	1–1 (a.e.t.)	Bulgaria
García Aspe 18' (pen.)		Stoichkov 6'
Penalties
García Aspe (penalty missed); Bernal (penalty missed); Rodríguez (penalty missed); Suárez (penalty scored)	1–3	(penalty missed) Balakov; (penalty scored) Genchev; (penalty scored) Borimirov; (penalty scored) Letchkov

Giants Stadium, East Rutherford
Attendance: 71,030
Referee: Jamal Al Sharif (Syria)

=== 1998 FIFA World Cup ===
==== Group Stage ====
Pos	Team	Pld	W	D	L	GF	GA	GD	Pts	Qualification
1	Netherlands	3	1	2	0	7	2	+5	5	Advance to knockout stage
2	Mexico	3	1	2	0	7	5	+2	5	Advance to knockout stage
3	Belgium	3	0	3	0	3	3	0	3	
4	South Korea	3	0	1	2	2	9	−7	1	

Source: FIFA
13 June 1998
17:30 CEST (UTC+2)

South Korea	1–3	Mexico
Ha Seok-ju 27'		Peláez 50'; Hernández 75', 84'

Stade de Gerland, Lyon
Attendance: 39,100
Referee: Günter Benkö (Austria)

20 June 1998
17:30 CEST (UTC+2)

Belgium	2–2	Mexico
Wilmots 42', 47'		García Aspe 55' (pen.); Blanco 62'

Parc Lescure, Bordeaux
Attendance: 31,800
Referee: Hugh Dallas (Scotland)

25 June 1998
16:00 CEST (UTC+2)

Netherlands	2–2	Mexico
Cocu 4'; R. de Boer 18'		Peláez 75'; Hernández 90+4'

Stade Geoffroy-Guichard, Saint-Étienne
Attendance: 30,600
Referee: Abdul Rahman Al-Zeid (Saudi Arabia)

==== Knockout stage ====
Round of 16

29 June 1998
16:30 CEST (UTC+2)

Germany	2–1	Mexico
Klinsmann 74'; Bierhoff 86'		Hernández 47'

Stade de la Mosson, Montpellier
Attendance: 29,800
Referee: Vítor Melo Pereira (Portugal)

=== 2002 FIFA World Cup ===
==== Group Stage ====
Pos	Team	Pld	W	D	L	GF	GA	GD	Pts	Qualification
1	Mexico	3	2	1	0	4	2	+2	7	Advance to knockout stage
2	Italy	3	1	1	1	4	3	+1	4	Advance to knockout stage
3	Croatia	3	1	0	2	2	3	−1	3	
4	Ecuador	3	1	0	2	2	4	−2	3	

Source: FIFA
3 June 2002
15:30

Croatia	0–1	Mexico
		Blanco 60' (pen.)

Niigata Big Swan Stadium, Niigata
Attendance: 32,239
Referee: Lu Jun (China)

9 June 2002
15:30

Mexico	2–1	Ecuador
Borgetti 28'; Torrado 57'		Delgado 5'

Miyagi Stadium, Miyagi
Attendance: 45,610
Referee: Mourad Daami (Tunisia)

13 June 2002
20:30

Mexico	1–1	Italy
Borgetti 34'		Del Piero 85'

Ōita Big Eye Stadium, Ōita
Attendance: 39,291
Referee: Carlos Simon (Brazil)

==== Knockout stage ====
Round of 16

17 June 2002
15:30

Mexico	0–2	United States
		McBride 8'; Donovan 65'

Jeonju World Cup Stadium, Jeonju
Attendance: 36,380
Referee: Vítor Melo Pereira (Portugal)

=== 2006 FIFA World Cup ===
==== Group Stage ====
Pos	Team	Pld	W	D	L	GF	GA	GD	Pts	Qualification
1	Portugal	3	3	0	0	5	1	+4	9	Advance to knockout stage
2	Mexico	3	1	1	1	4	3	+1	4	Advance to knockout stage
3	Angola	3	0	2	1	1	2	−1	2	
4	Iran	3	0	1	2	2	6	−4	1	

Source: FIFA
11 June 2006
18:00

Mexico	3–1	Iran
Bravo 28', 76'; Sinha 79'		Golmohammadi 36'

Frankenstadion, Nuremberg
Attendance: 41,000
Referee: Roberto Rosetti (Italy)

16 June 2006
21:00

Mexico	0–0	Angola

Niedersachsenstadion, Hanover
Attendance: 43,000
Referee: Shamsul Maidin (Singapore)

21 June 2006
16:00

Portugal	2–1	Mexico
Maniche 6'; Simão 24' (pen.)		Fonseca 29'

Arena AufSchalke, Gelsenkirchen
Attendance: 52,000
Referee: Ľuboš Micheľ (Slovakia)

==== Knockout stage ====
Round of 16

24 June 2006
21:00

Argentina	2–1 (a.e.t.)	Mexico
Crespo 10'; Rodríguez 98'		Márquez 5'

Zentralstadion, Leipzig
Attendance: 43,000
Referee: Massimo Busacca (Switzerland)

=== 2010 FIFA World Cup ===
==== Group Stage ====
Pos	Team	Pld	W	D	L	GF	GA	GD	Pts	Qualification
1	Uruguay	3	2	1	0	4	0	+4	7	Advance to knockout stage
2	Mexico	3	1	1	1	3	2	+1	4	Advance to knockout stage
3	South Africa (H)	3	1	1	1	3	5	−2	4	
4	France	3	0	1	2	1	4	−3	1	

Source: FIFA
(H) Hosts
11 June 2010
16:00

South Africa	1–1	Mexico
Tshabalala 55'		Márquez 79'

Soccer City, Johannesburg
Attendance: 84,490
Referee: Ravshan Irmatov (Uzbekistan)

17 June 2010
20:30

France	0–2	Mexico
		Hernández 64'; Blanco 79' (pen.)

Peter Mokaba Stadium, Polokwane
Attendance: 35,370
Referee: Khalil Al Ghamdi (Saudi Arabia)

22 June 2010
16:00

Mexico	0–1	Uruguay
		Suárez 43'

Royal Bafokeng Stadium, Rustenburg
Attendance: 33,425
Referee: Viktor Kassai (Hungary)

==== Knockout stage ====
Round of 16

27 June 2010
20:30

Argentina	3–1	Mexico
Tevez 26', 52'; Higuaín 33'		Hernández 71'

Soccer City, Johannesburg
Attendance: 84,377
Referee: Roberto Rosetti (Italy)

=== 2014 FIFA World Cup ===
==== Group Stage ====
Pos	Team	Pld	W	D	L	GF	GA	GD	Pts	Qualification
1	Brazil (H)	3	2	1	0	7	2	+5	7	Advance to knockout stage
2	Mexico	3	2	1	0	4	1	+3	7	Advance to knockout stage
3	Croatia	3	1	0	2	6	6	0	3	
4	Cameroon	3	0	0	3	1	9	−8	0	

Source: FIFA
(H) Hosts
13 June 2014
13:00 BRT (UTC−3)

Mexico	1–0	Cameroon
Peralta 61'

Arena das Dunas, Natal
Attendance: 39,216
Referee: Wilmar Roldán (Colombia)

17 June 2014
16:00 BRT (UTC−3)

Brazil	0–0	Mexico

Estádio Castelão, Fortaleza
Attendance: 60,342
Referee: Cüneyt Çakır (Turkey)

23 June 2014
17:00 BRT (UTC−3)

Croatia	1–3	Mexico
Perišić 87'		Márquez 72'; Guardado 75'; Hernández 82'

Itaipava Arena Pernambuco, Recife
Attendance: 41,212
Referee: Ravshan Irmatov (Uzbekistan)

==== Knockout stage ====
Round of 16

29 June 2014
13:00 BRT (UTC−3)

Netherlands	2–1	Mexico
Sneijder 88'; Huntelaar 90+4' (pen.)		Dos Santos 48'

Estádio Castelão, Fortaleza
Attendance: 58,817
Referee: Pedro Proença (Portugal)

=== 2018 FIFA World Cup ===
==== Group Stage ====
Pos	Team	Pld	W	D	L	GF	GA	GD	Pts	Qualification
1	Sweden	3	2	0	1	5	2	+3	6	Advance to knockout stage
2	Mexico	3	2	0	1	3	4	−1	6	Advance to knockout stage
3	South Korea	3	1	0	2	3	3	0	3	
4	Germany	3	1	0	2	2	4	−2	3	

Source: FIFA
17 June 2018
18:00 MSK (UTC+3)

Germany	0–1	Mexico
		Lozano 35'

Luzhniki Stadium, Moscow
Attendance: 78,011
Referee: Alireza Faghani (Iran)

23 June 2018
18:00 MSK (UTC+3)

South Korea	1–2	Mexico
Son Heung-min 90+3'		Vela 26' (pen.); Hernández 66'

Rostov Arena, Rostov-on-Don
Attendance: 43,472
Referee: Milorad Mažić (Serbia)

27 June 2018
19:00 YEKT (UTC+5)

Mexico	0–3	Sweden
		Augustinsson 50'; Granqvist 62' (pen.); Álvarez 74' (o.g.)

Central Stadium, Yekaterinburg
Attendance: 33,061
Referee: Néstor Pitana (Argentina)

==== Knockout stage ====
Round of 16

2 July 2018
18:00 SAMT (UTC+4)

Brazil	2–0	Mexico
Neymar 51'; Firmino 88'

Cosmos Arena, Samara
Attendance: 41,970
Referee: Gianluca Rocchi (Italy)

=== 2022 FIFA World Cup ===
==== Group Stage ====
Pos	Team	Pld	W	D	L	GF	GA	GD	Pts	Qualification
1	Argentina	3	2	0	1	5	2	+3	6	Advance to knockout stage
2	Poland	3	1	1	1	2	2	0	4	Advance to knockout stage
3	Mexico	3	1	1	1	2	3	−1	4	
4	Saudi Arabia	3	1	0	2	3	5	−2	3	

Source: FIFA
Rules for classification: Group stage tiebreakers
22 November 2022
19:00

Mexico	0–0	Poland

Stadium 974, Doha
Attendance: 39,369
Referee: Chris Beath (Australia)

26 November 2022
22:00

Argentina	2–0	Mexico
Messi 64'; Fernández 87'

Lusail Stadium, Lusail
Attendance: 88,966
Referee: Daniele Orsato (Italy)

30 November 2022
22:00

Saudi Arabia	1–2	Mexico
S. Al-Dawsari 90+5'		Martín 47'; Chávez 52'

Lusail Stadium, Lusail
Attendance: 84,985
Referee: Michael Oliver (England)

=== 2026 FIFA World Cup ===
==== Group Stage ====
Pos	Team	Pld	W	D	L	GF	GA	GD	Pts	Qualification
1	Mexico (H)	3	3	0	0	6	0	+6	9	Advance to knockout stage
2	South Africa	3	1	1	1	2	3	−1	4	Advance to knockout stage
3	South Korea	3	1	0	2	2	3	−1	3	
4	Czech Republic	3	0	1	2	2	6	−4	1	

Source: FIFA
Rules for classification: Group stage tiebreakers
(H) Hosts
June 11, 2026
1:00 p.m. UTC−6

Mexico	2–0	South Africa
Quiñones 9'; Jiménez 67'	(Note: "Mexico vs South Africa | First Stage | FIFA World Cup 2026". FIFA. Retrieved June 11, 2026.; "Match Report – Group A – Mexico v. South Africa". FIFA. June 11, 2026. Retrieved June 11, 2026.; "Post match summary report – Group A – Mexico v. South Africa". FIFA. June 12, 2026. Retrieved June 12, 2026.)

Estadio Azteca, Mexico City
Attendance: 80,824
Referee: Wilton Sampaio (Brazil)

June 18, 2026
7:00 p.m. UTC−6

Mexico	1–0	South Korea
Romo 50'	(Note: "Mexico vs Korea Republic | First Stage | FIFA World Cup 2026". FIFA. Retrieved June 19, 2026.; "Match Report – Group A – Mexico v. Korea Republic". FIFA. June 19, 2026. Retrieved June 19, 2026.; "Post match summary report – Group A – Mexico v. Korea Republic". FIFA. June 18, 2026. Retrieved June 19, 2026.)

Estadio Akron, Zapopan
Attendance: 45,522
Referee: Gustavo Tejera (Uruguay)

June 24, 2026
7:00 p.m. UTC−6

Czech Republic	0–3	Mexico
	(Note: "Czechia vs Mexico | First Stage | FIFA World Cup 2026". FIFA. Retrieved June 25, 2026.; "Match Report – Group A – Czechia v. Mexico". FIFA. June 25, 2026. Retrieved June 25, 2026.; "Post match summary report – Group A – Czechia v. Mexico". FIFA. June 25, 2026. Retrieved June 25, 2026.)	M. Chávez 55'; Quiñones 61'; Fidalgo 90+4'

Estadio Azteca, Mexico City
Attendance: 80,824
Referee: Yael Falcón (Argentina)

==== Knockout stage ====
Round of 32

June 30, 2026
8:00 p.m. UTC−6 (Note: The Mexico v Ecuador match, originally scheduled for 7:00 p.m. UTC−6, was delayed by an hour due to adverse weather conditions.)

Mexico	2–0	Ecuador
Quiñones 22'; Jiménez 31'	(Note: "Mexico vs Ecuador | Round of 32 | FIFA World Cup 2026". FIFA. Retrieved July 1, 2026.; "Match Report – Round of 32 – Mexico v. Ecuador". FIFA. July 1, 2026. Retrieved July 1, 2026.; "Post match summary report – Round of 32 – Mexico v. Ecuador". FIFA. July 1, 2026. Retrieved July 1, 2026.)

Estadio Azteca, Mexico City
Attendance: 80,824
Referee: Slavko Vinčić (Slovenia)

Round of 16

July 5, 2026
7:00 p.m. UTC−6 (Note: The Mexico v England match, originally scheduled for 6:00 p.m. UTC−6, was delayed by an hour due to adverse weather conditions.)

Mexico	2–3	England
Quiñones 42'; Jiménez 69' (pen.)	(Note: "Mexico vs England | Round of 16 | FIFA World Cup 2026". FIFA. Retrieved July 6, 2026.; "Match Report – Round of 16 – Mexico v. England". FIFA. July 6, 2026. Retrieved July 6, 2026.; "Post match summary report – Round of 16 – Mexico v. England". FIFA. July 6, 2026. Retrieved July 6, 2026.)	Bellingham 36', 38'; Kane 60' (pen.)

Estadio Azteca, Mexico City
Attendance: 80,824
Referee: Alireza Faghani (Australia)

== Player records ==
=== Most appearances ===
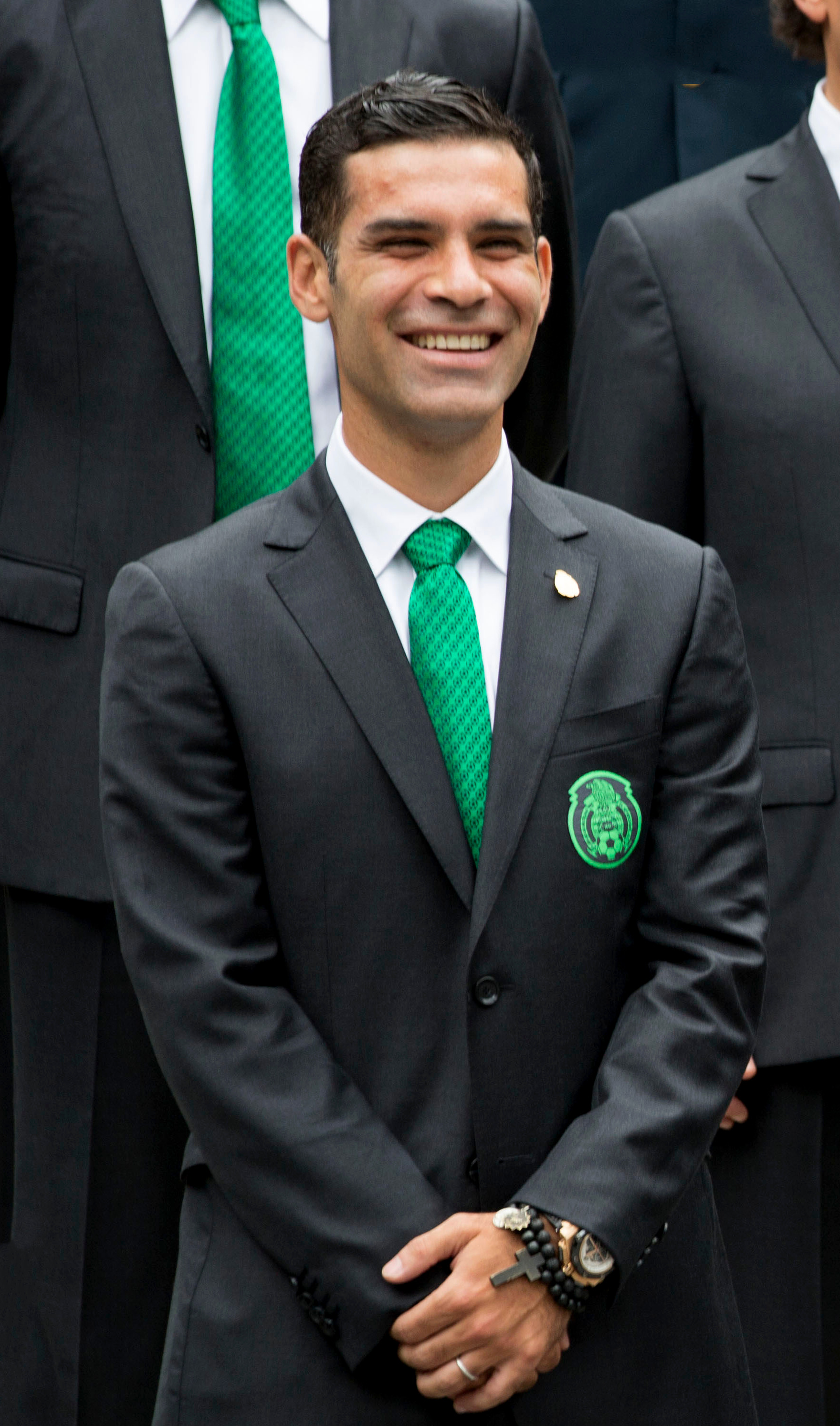
Rafael Márquez is Mexico's record World Cup appearance maker, and one of only three Mexican players with appearances in five tournaments.

Rank	Player	Matches	World Cups
1	Rafael Márquez	19	2002, 2006, 2010, 2014 and 2018
2	Andrés Guardado	13	2006, 2010, 2014, 2018 and 2022
3	Guillermo Ochoa	12	2006, 2010, 2014, 2018, 2022 and 2026
3	Javier Hernández	12	2010, 2014 and 2018
3	Héctor Moreno	12	2010, 2014, 2018 and 2022
3	Jesús Gallardo	12	2018, 2022 and 2026
7	Antonio Carbajal	11	1950, 1954, 1958, 1962 and 1966
7	Cuauhtémoc Blanco	11	1998, 2002 and 2010
7	Gerardo Torrado	11	2002, 2006 and 2010
10	Carlos Salcido	10	2006, 2010 and 2014
10	Héctor Herrera	10	2014, 2018 and 2022
10	Raúl Jiménez	10	2014, 2018, 2022 and 2026
10	Edson Álvarez	10	2018, 2022 and 2026

=== Top goalscorers ===
On July 13, 1930, Juan Carreño made history by scoring Mexico’s first-ever FIFA World Cup goal. It happened on their opening match against France in Montevideo.

Rank	Player	Goals	World Cups
1	Luis Hernández	4	1998
1	Javier Hernández	4	2010 (2), 2014 (1) and 2018 (1)
1	Julián Quiñones	4	2026
4	Cuauhtémoc Blanco	3	1998, 2002 and 2010
4	Rafael Márquez	3	2006, 2010 and 2014
4	Raúl Jiménez	3	2026
7	Manuel Rosas	2	1930
7	Javier Valdivia	2	1970
7	Fernando Quirarte	2	1986
7	Luis García	2	1994
7	Alberto García Aspe	2	1994 and 1998
7	Ricardo Peláez	2	1998
7	Jared Borgetti	2	2002
7	Omar Bravo	2	2006

== Head-to-head record ==
Opponent	Pld	W	D	L	GF	GA	GD	Win %
Angola	1	0	1	0	0	0	+0	0.00
Argentina	4	0	0	4	5	13	−8	0.00
Belgium	3	2	1	0	5	3	+2	66.67
Brazil	5	0	1	4	0	13	−13	0.00
Bulgaria	2	1	1	0	3	1	+2	50.00
Cameroon	1	1	0	0	1	0	+1	100.00
Chile	1	0	0	1	0	3	−3	0.00
Croatia	2	2	0	0	4	1	+3	100.00
Czech Republic	1	1	0	0	3	0	+3	100.00
Czechoslovakia	1	1	0	0	3	1	+2	100.00
Ecuador	2	2	0	0	4	1	+3	100.00
El Salvador	1	1	0	0	4	0	+4	100.00
England	2	0	0	2	2	5	−3	0.00
France	4	1	1	2	6	8	−2	25.00
Germany	2	1	0	1	2	2	+0	50.00
Hungary	1	0	0	1	0	4	−4	0.00
Iran	1	1	0	0	3	1	+2	100.00
Iraq	1	1	0	0	1	0	+1	100.00
Italy	3	0	2	1	3	6	−3	0.00
Netherlands	2	0	1	1	3	4	−1	0.00
Norway	1	0	0	1	0	1	−1	0.00
Paraguay	1	0	1	0	1	1	+0	0.00
Poland	2	0	1	1	1	3	−2	0.00
Portugal	1	0	0	1	1	2	−1	0.00
Republic of Ireland	1	1	0	0	2	1	+1	100.00
Saudi Arabia	1	1	0	0	2	1	+1	100.00
South Africa	2	1	1	0	3	1	+2	50.00
South Korea	3	3	0	0	6	2	+4	100.00
Soviet Union	1	0	1	0	0	0	+0	0.00
Spain	1	0	0	1	0	1	−1	0.00
Sweden	2	0	0	2	0	6	−6	0.00
Switzerland	1	0	0	1	1	2	−1	0.00
Tunisia	1	0	0	1	1	3	−2	0.00
United States	1	0	0	1	0	2	−2	0.00
Uruguay	2	0	1	1	0	1	−1	0.00
Yugoslavia	1	0	0	1	1	4	−3	0.00
West Germany	2	0	1	1	0	6	−6	0.00
Wales	1	0	1	0	1	1	+0	0.00
Total	65	21	15	29	72	104	−32	32.31

== See also ==
- Mexico at the CONCACAF Gold Cup
- Mexico at the CONCACAF Nations League
- Mexico at the Copa América
- North, Central American and Caribbean nations at the FIFA World Cup
