= 1964 Mitropa Cup =

Tournament details
- Dates: June – September 1964
- Teams: 8

Final positions
- Champions: (Czechoslovakia) Spartak Praha Sokolovo (3rd title)
- Runners-up: (Czechoslovakia) Slovan Bratislava

Tournament statistics
- Matches played: 14
- Goals scored: 37 (2.64 per match)

The 1964 season of the Mitropa Cup football club tournament was won by Spartak Praha Sokolovo who defeated Slovan Bratislava 2–0 on aggregate in the final. It was the club's third victory in the competition, having previously won it in 1927 and 1935.

== Quarter-finals ==
The matches took place on 17 and 20 June.

Team 1	Agg.	Team 2	1st leg	2nd leg
Spartak Praha Sokolovo (Czechoslovakia)	4–2	(Hungary) MTK Budapest	1–1	3–1
Željezničar Sarajevo (Socialist Federal Republic of Yugoslavia)	2–4	(Czechoslovakia) Slovan Bratislava	2–1	0–3
Vasas (Hungary)	4–2	(Austria) Linzer ASK	3–1	1–1
Bologna (Italy)	3–2	(Socialist Federal Republic of Yugoslavia) OFK Beograd	1–0	2–2

== Semi-finals ==
The matches took place on 24 June and 1 July.

Team 1	Agg.	Team 2	1st leg	2nd leg
Slovan Bratislava (Czechoslovakia)	3–2	(Hungary) Vasas	1–1	2–1
Bologna (Italy)	2–5	(Czechoslovakia) Spartak Praha Sokolovo	2–2	0–3

=== First leg ===
24 June 1964

Slovan Bratislava (Czechoslovakia)	1 – 1	(Hungary) Vasas
Jokl 16'		Farkas 14'

Tehelné pole, Bratislava
Attendance: 25,000
24 June 1964

Bologna (Italy)	2 – 2	(Czechoslovakia) Spartak Praha Sokolovo
Corradi 10'; Pantani 40'		Mráz; Mašek 60'

Bologna
Attendance: 4,000

=== Second leg ===
1 July 1964

Vasas (Hungary)	1 – 2	(Czechoslovakia) Slovan Bratislava
Puskás 57'		Tománek 1'; Mészöly 87' (o.g.)

Budapest
Attendance: 10,000
Referee: Gennaro (Italy)

Slovan Bratislava won 3–2 on aggregate.

1 July 1964

Spartak Praha Sokolovo (Czechoslovakia)	3 – 0	(Italy) Bologna
Mráz 68'; Mašek 76'; Dyba 84'

Stadion Letná, Prague

Spartak Praha Sokolovo won 5–2 on aggregate.

== Finals ==
The matches took place on 5 August and 2 September.

Team 1	Agg.	Team 2	1st leg	2nd leg
Slovan Bratislava (Czechoslovakia)	0–2	(Czechoslovakia) Spartak Praha Sokolovo	0–0	0–2

=== First leg ===
5 August 1964

Slovan Bratislava (Czechoslovakia)	0–0	(Czechoslovakia) Spartak Praha Sokolovo

Tehelné pole, Bratislava
Attendance: 30,000

GK	(Czechoslovakia) Viliam Schrojf
DF	(Czechoslovakia) Anton Urban
DF	(Czechoslovakia) Alexander Horváth
DF	(Czechoslovakia) Jozef Fillo
MF	(Czechoslovakia) Ján Zlocha
MF	(Czechoslovakia) Peter Molnár
FW	(Czechoslovakia) Ľudovít Cvetler
FW	(Czechoslovakia) Pavol Molnár
FW	(Czechoslovakia) Karol Jokl
FW	(Czechoslovakia) Jozef Adamec
FW	(Czechoslovakia) Viliam Hrnčár
Manager:
(Czechoslovakia) Leopold Šťastný

GK	(Czechoslovakia) Antonín Kramerius
DF	(Czechoslovakia) Milan Kollár
DF	(Czechoslovakia) Jiří Tichý
DF	(Czechoslovakia) Vladimír Táborský
MF	(Czechoslovakia) Josef Vojta
MF	(Czechoslovakia) Jiří Gůra
FW	(Czechoslovakia) Jiří Hák
FW	(Czechoslovakia) Ivan Mráz
FW	(Czechoslovakia) Tadeusz Kraus
FW	(Czechoslovakia) Václav Mašek
FW	(Czechoslovakia) Pavel Dyba
Manager:
(Czechoslovakia) Václav Ježek

=== Second leg ===
2 September 1964

Spartak Praha Sokolovo (Czechoslovakia)	2–0	(Czechoslovakia) Slovan Bratislava
Mašek 12', 53'

Stadion Letná, Prague
Attendance: 30,000
Referee: Alojz Obtulovič (Czechoslovakia)

GK	(Czechoslovakia) Antonín Kramerius
DF	(Czechoslovakia) Milan Kollár
DF	(Czechoslovakia) Jiří Tichý
DF	(Czechoslovakia) Vladimír Táborský
MF	(Czechoslovakia) Josef Vojta
MF	(Czechoslovakia) Karel Steiningel
FW	(Czechoslovakia) Pavel Dyba
FW	(Czechoslovakia) Ivan Mráz
FW	(Czechoslovakia) Tadeusz Kraus
FW	(Czechoslovakia) Václav Mašek
FW	(Czechoslovakia) Václav Vrána
Manager:
(Czechoslovakia) Václav Ježek

GK	(Czechoslovakia) Viliam Schrojf
DF	(Czechoslovakia) Anton Urban
DF	(Czechoslovakia) Ján Popluhár
DF	(Czechoslovakia) Jozef Fillo
MF	(Czechoslovakia) Ján Zlocha
MF	(Czechoslovakia) Alexander Horváth
FW	(Czechoslovakia) Pavol Molnár
FW	(Czechoslovakia) Karol Jokl
FW	(Czechoslovakia) Ivan Hrdlička
FW	(Czechoslovakia) Viliam Hrnčár
FW	(Czechoslovakia) Ľudovít Cvetler
Manager:
(Czechoslovakia) Leopold Šťastný
