= Antonín Kramerius =

Czechoslovak footballer (1939–2019)

Personal information
- Date of birth: 10 July 1939
- Place of birth: Olomouc, Czechoslovakia
- Date of death: 15 January 2019 (aged 79)
- Place of death: Prague, Czech Republic

Senior career*
Years	Team	Apps	(Gls)
1962–1972	Sparta Prague	182	(0)
1972–1973	Spartak Hradec Králové	23	(0)
Total		205	(0)

International career
1967–1970	Czechoslovakia	2	(0)
- * Club domestic league appearances and goals

Antonín Kramerius (10 July 1939 – 15 January 2019) was a Czechoslovak footballer. He competed in the men's tournament at the 1968 Summer Olympics. At club level, Kramerius played for Sparta Prague and Spartak Hradec Králové. He won two caps for the Czechoslovakia national football team.

== Honours ==
Sparta Prague

- Czechoslovak First League (2): 1964–65, 1966–67
- Czechoslovak Cup (2): 1963–64, 1971–72
- Mitropa Cup: 1964
