= Josef Vojta =

Czech footballer (1935–2023)

Personal information
- Date of birth: 19 April 1935
- Place of birth: Plzeň, Czechoslovakia
- Date of death: 6 March 2023 (aged 87)
- Position: Midfielder

Senior career*
Years	Team	Apps	(Gls)
1960–1968	Sparta Prague	351	(77)
1968–1971	Chomutov	?	(?)

International career
1960–1966	Czechoslovakia	7	(0)
Medal record
Men's football
Representing Czechoslovakia
Olympic Games
Silver medal – second place	1964 Tokyo	Team competition
- * Club domestic league appearances and goals

Josef Vojta (19 April 1935 – 6 March 2023) was a Czech footballer.

== Career ==
His youth football career started in FK Ústí nad Labem. During his professional club career he played most of the time (1960–1968) for Sparta Prague in Czechoslovak First League. Between 1960 and 1968 he made 351 league appearances and scored 77 goals from his position of midfielder. He earned 13 caps and scored 3 goals for the Czechoslovakia national team, and was part of the bronze team at the UEFA Euro 1960, and also won a silver medal in Football at the 1964 Summer Olympics. Vojta was famous for his hard style of playing – he was the "hardest footballer" in the 1960s in Czechoslovakia. And also, he was famous for his versatility, because his position on field could be attacker or midfielder same as defender. After leaving Sparta Prague in 1968, he played in FK Chomutov, FK Meteor Prague and other smaller Czech football clubs. He ended up with his professional career in the end of 1970s. Vojta still played football for Formal Sparta Prague players team. In 2010, he was elected to Sparta Prague Hall of Fame.

== Honours ==
Sparta Prague

- Czechoslovak First League: 1964–65, 1966–67
- Czechoslovak Cup: 1964
- Mitropa Cup: 1964

Czechoslovakia

- UEFA Euro 1960: Bronze medal
- 1964 Summer Olympics: Silver medal
