= SK Baťov 1930 =

- Full name: SK Baťov 1930 z.s.
- Founded: 1930
- Ground: Areál SK Baťov
- Chairman: Vlastimír Hrubčík
- Manager: Petr Bláha
- League: Czech Fourth Division – Divize E
- 2025–26: 9th

SK Baťov 1930 is a Czech football club located in Otrokovice in the Zlín Region. The club currently plays at the fourth level of football in the Czech Republic.

The club played in the Czechoslovak First League, the top flight of Czechoslovak football, in the 1964–65 season under the name of Jiskra Otrokovice.

== Historical names ==
- 1930: SK Otrokovice
- 1935: SK Baťov
- 1948: ZK Botostroj Baťov
- 1948: Sokol Svit Otrokovice
- 1953: Jiskra Otrokovice
- 2009: SK Baťov 1930
