= Mexico at the Copa América =

Senior men's football tournament

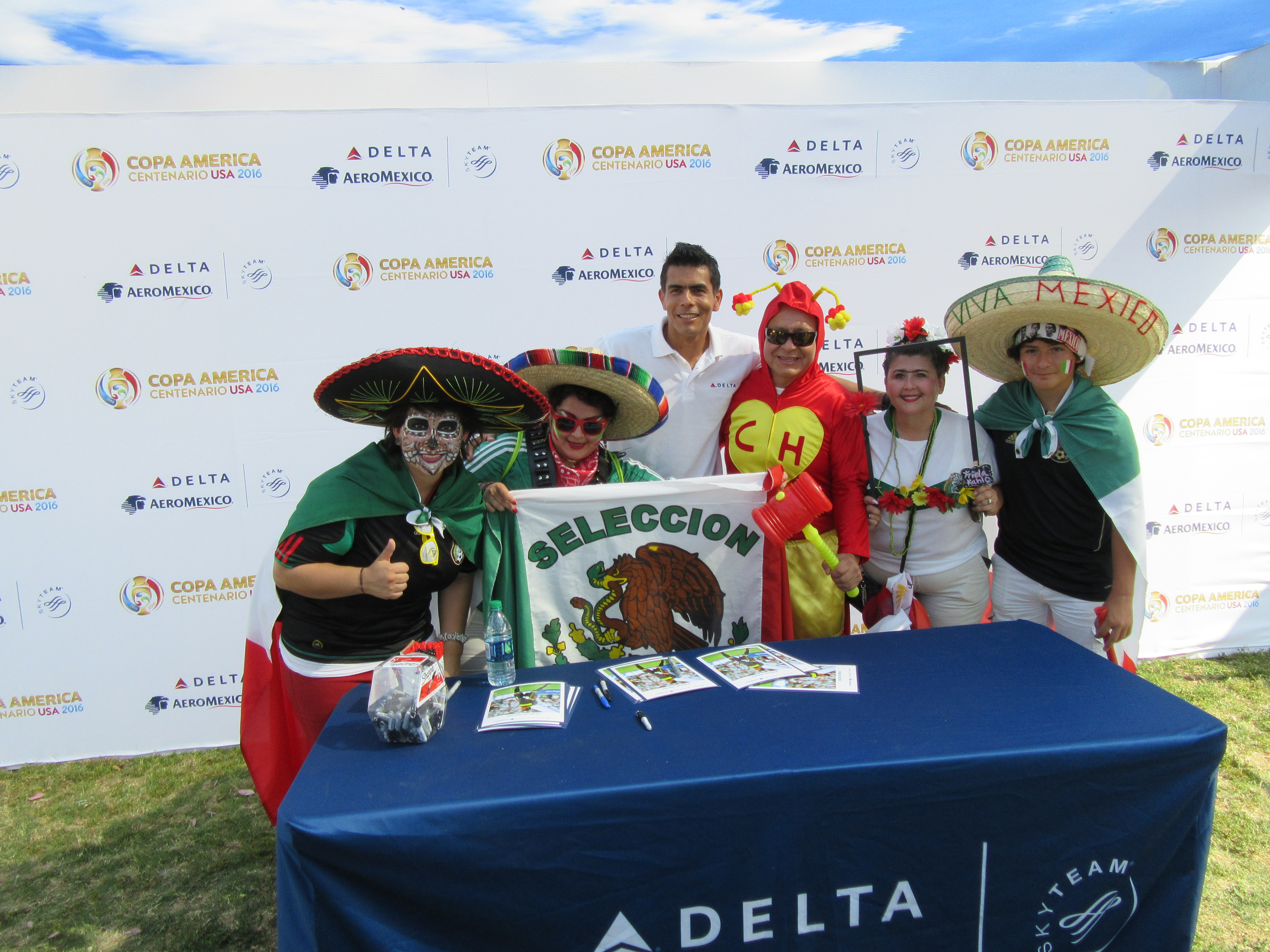
Three-time Copa América squad member and 2001 finalist Oswaldo Sánchez (middle) celebrating with fans ahead of the group match against Jamaica at the Copa América Centenario.

The Copa América is South America's major tournament in senior men's football and determines the continental champion. Until 1967, the tournament was known as South American Championship. It is the oldest continental championship in the world.

Mexico are not members of the South American football confederation CONMEBOL, but because CONMEBOL only has ten member associations, guest nations have regularly been invited to participate in the Copa América since 1993. Mexico have been the most regular invitee, competing in ten consecutive Copas from 1993 to 2016. However, they did not play in the 2019 or 2021 editions. In 2024, Mexico qualified for the Copa América via the CONCACAF Nations League.

Mexico have reached the final twice, and finished third on three more occasions. This makes Mexico the most successful invitee by far, and are even ahead of CONMEBOL member Venezuela in the Copa América all-time table.

== Record at the Copa América ==
Copa América record
| Year | Round | Position | Pld | W | D* | L | GF | GA |
|---|---|---|---|---|---|---|---|---|
| 1916–1991 | Not invited | | | | | | | |
| (Ecuador) 1993 | Runners-up | 2nd | 6 | 2 | 2 | 2 | 9 | 7 |
| (Uruguay) 1995 | Quarter-finals | 7th | 4 | 1 | 2 | 1 | 5 | 4 |
| (Bolivia) 1997 | Semi-finals | 3rd | 6 | 2 | 2 | 2 | 8 | 9 |
| (Paraguay) 1999 | Semi-finals | 3rd | 6 | 3 | 1 | 2 | 10 | 9 |
| (Colombia) 2001 | Runners-up | 2nd | 6 | 3 | 1 | 2 | 5 | 3 |
| (Peru) 2004 | Quarter-finals | 6th | 4 | 2 | 1 | 1 | 5 | 7 |
| (Venezuela) 2007 | Semi-finals | 3rd | 6 | 4 | 1 | 1 | 13 | 5 |
| (Argentina) 2011 | Group stage | 12th | 3 | 0 | 0 | 3 | 1 | 4 |
| (Chile) 2015 | Group stage | 11th | 3 | 0 | 2 | 1 | 4 | 5 |
| (United States) 2016 | Quarter-finals | 7th | 4 | 2 | 1 | 1 | 6 | 9 |
| (Brazil) 2019 | Not invited | | | | | | | |
| (Brazil) 2021 | Not invited | | | | | | | |
| (United States) 2024 | Group stage | 9th | 3 | 1 | 1 | 1 | 1 | 1 |
| Total | Runners-up | 11/13 | 51 | 20 | 14 | 17 | 67 | 63 |

* Draws include matches decided via penalty shoot-out.

== Record by opponent ==
Mexico's largest victory at the Copa América was a 6–0 win against Paraguay in 2007. Their largest defeat was a 0–7 loss against eventual champions Chile in 2016.

Copa América matches (by team)
| Opponent | W | D | L | Pld | GF | GA |
|---|---|---|---|---|---|---|
| Argentina | 1 | 1 | 2 | 4 | 3 | 6 |
| Bolivia | 0 | 2 | 1 | 3 | 1 | 3 |
| Brazil | 2 | 0 | 4 | 6 | 6 | 11 |
| Chile | 3 | 2 | 2 | 7 | 9 | 13 |
| Colombia | 1 | 0 | 2 | 3 | 3 | 4 |
| Costa Rica | 0 | 1 | 0 | 1 | 1 | 1 |
| Ecuador | 3 | 2 | 1 | 6 | 8 | 5 |
| Jamaica | 2 | 0 | 0 | 2 | 3 | 0 |
| Paraguay | 1 | 1 | 1 | 3 | 7 | 2 |
| Peru | 2 | 1 | 2 | 5 | 8 | 7 |
| United States | 0 | 1 | 0 | 1 | 0 | 0 |
| Uruguay | 3 | 2 | 1 | 6 | 11 | 7 |
| Venezuela | 2 | 1 | 1 | 3 | 7 | 4 |
| Total | 20 | 14 | 17 | 51 | 67 | 63 |

== Record players ==
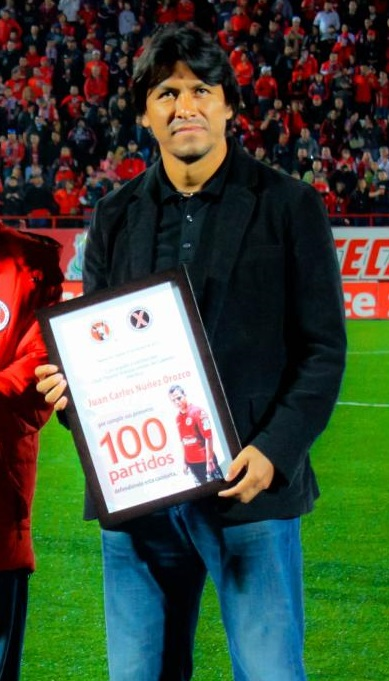
Claudio Suárez is one of the most-capped football players in the world. With 21 matches, he is also the most-capped player of any invited nation at the Copa América.

Rafael Márquez is one of only two players to compete in Copa Américas 17 years apart, the other being Álex Aguinaga. Concerning the exact time span between first and last match, Márquez is trailing 30 days behind Aguinaga's record of 17 years and 9 days.

| Rank | Player | Matches | Tournaments |
|---|---|---|---|
| 1 | Claudio Suárez | 21 | 1993, 1995, 1997, 1999 and 2004 |
| 2 | Rafael Márquez | 18 | 1999, 2001, 2004, 2007, 2011 and 2016 |
| 3 | Alberto García Aspe | 17 | 1993, 1995, 1999 and 2001 |
| 3 | Gerardo Torrado | 17 | 1999, 2001, 2004 and 2007 |
| 5 | Jorge Campos | 14 | 1993, 1995 and 1999 |
| 5 | Cuauhtémoc Blanco | 14 | 1997, 1999 and 2007 |
| 7 | Ramón Ramírez | 13 | 1993, 1995 and 1999 |
| 8 | Pavel Pardo | 11 | 1997, 1999 and 2004 |
| 8 | Daniel Osorno | 11 | 1999, 2001 and 2004 |
| 8 | Ramón Morales | 11 | 2001, 2004 and 2007 |

== Top goalscorers ==
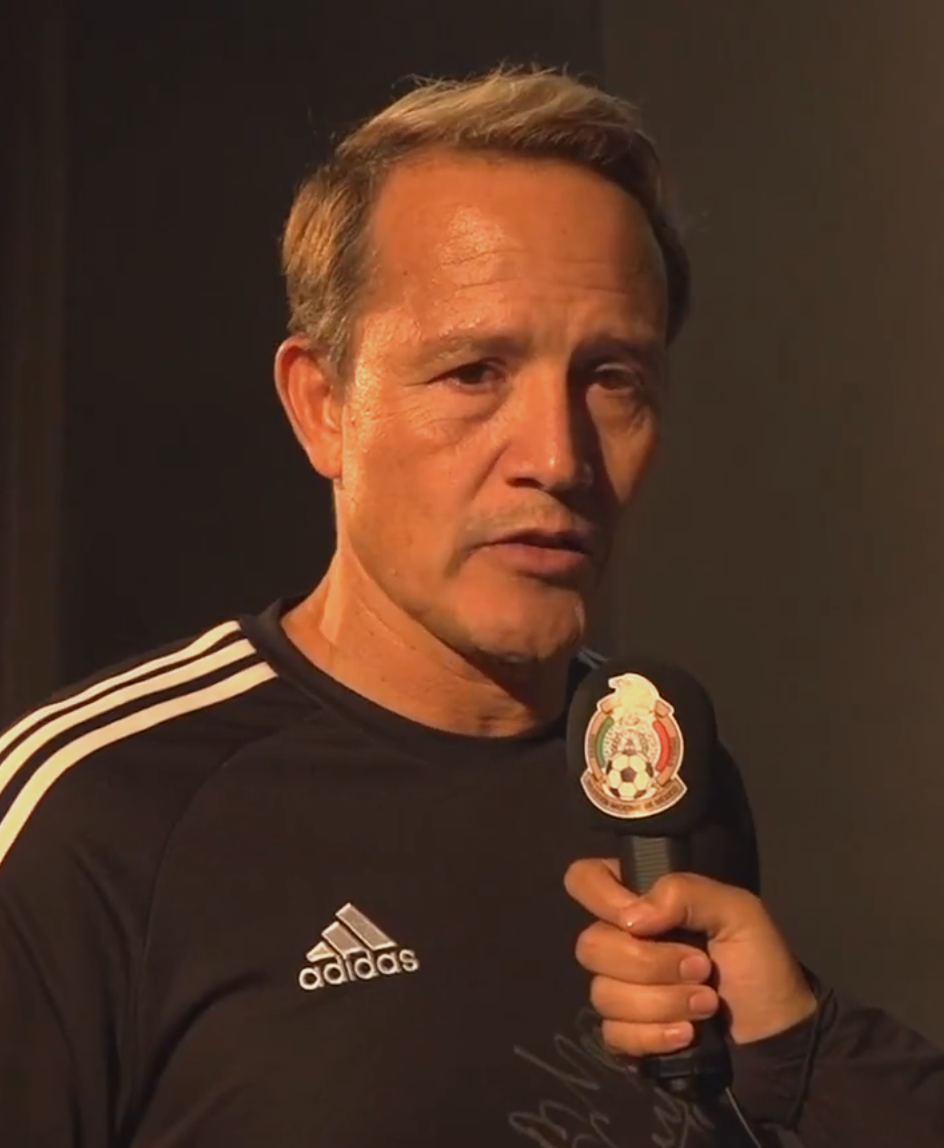
Luis Hernández is Mexico's all-time top-scorer at the Copa América. He is also his country's joint top scorer at the FIFA World Cup.

| Rank | Player | Goals | Tournaments |
|---|---|---|---|
| 1 | Luis Hernández | 9 | 1997 (6) and 1999 (3) |
| 2 | Cuauhtémoc Blanco | 5 | 1997 (1), 1999 (2) and 2007 (2) |
| 3 | Luis García | 4 | 1995 |
| 3 | Nery Castillo | 4 | 2007 |
| 5 | Alberto García Aspe | 3 | 1993 (2) and 2001 (1) |
| 5 | Omar Bravo | 3 | 2007 |
| 7 | 8 players | 2 | |

== Awards and records ==
Team Awards

- Runners-up: 1993, 2001
- Third place: 1997, 1999, 2007

Individual Awards

- Top Scorer 1995: Luis García (4 goals) (shared)
- Top Scorer 1997: Luis Hernández (6 goals)

Team Records

- Non-CONMEBOL member with most appearances (11)

== See also ==
- Mexico at the FIFA World Cup
- Mexico at the CONCACAF Gold Cup
- Mexico at the CONCACAF Nations League
