= Pavol Bencz =

Czechoslovak footballer (1936–2012)

Personal information
- Date of birth: 25 June 1936
- Place of birth: Czechoslovakia
- Date of death: 18 April 2012 (aged 75)
- Place of death: Trenčín, Slovakia
- Position: Striker

Senior career*
Years	Team	Apps	(Gls)
1960–1969	Jednota Trenčín		
1968–1969	ZVL Žilina		

International career
1959–1965	Czechoslovakia B	4	(2)
1964	Czechoslovakia	1	(0)
- * Club domestic league appearances and goals

Pavol Bencz (25 June 1936 – 18 April 2012) was a football player. He played for the Czechoslovakia national team and was the top scorer of the 1964–65 Czechoslovak First League, with 21 goals. As well as playing for his national team, he also scored twice in four appearances for Czechoslovakia B. He scored a total of 82 league goals in 182 matches, playing his club football for Jednota Trenčín and ZVL Žilina. Bencz died in Trenčín at the age of 75 on 18 April 2012.
