= Branko Tesanić =

- Born: 10 February 1920; Varaždin, Kingdom of Serbs, Croats and Slovenes
- Died: 25 August 1984 (aged 64); Yugoslavia

Domestic
Years	League	Role
–1964	Yugoslav First League	Referee
1962–1964	NB I	Referee

International
Years	League	Role
1960–1964	FIFA listed	Referee

Branko Tesanić (10 February 1920 – 25 August 1984) was a Yugoslav football referee. He was selected for the 1962 FIFA World Cup, and officiated the Group 3 match between Spain and Mexico.

During the second leg of the 1963–64 European Cup semi-finals between Inter Milan and Borussia Dortmund, he caused controversy by failing to send off Spanish player Luis Suárez Miramontes after he violently kicked and injured a Dortmund player.

== Other websites ==
- Branko Tesanić at WorldFootball.net
