= Josef Jelínek =

Czech footballer (1941–2024)

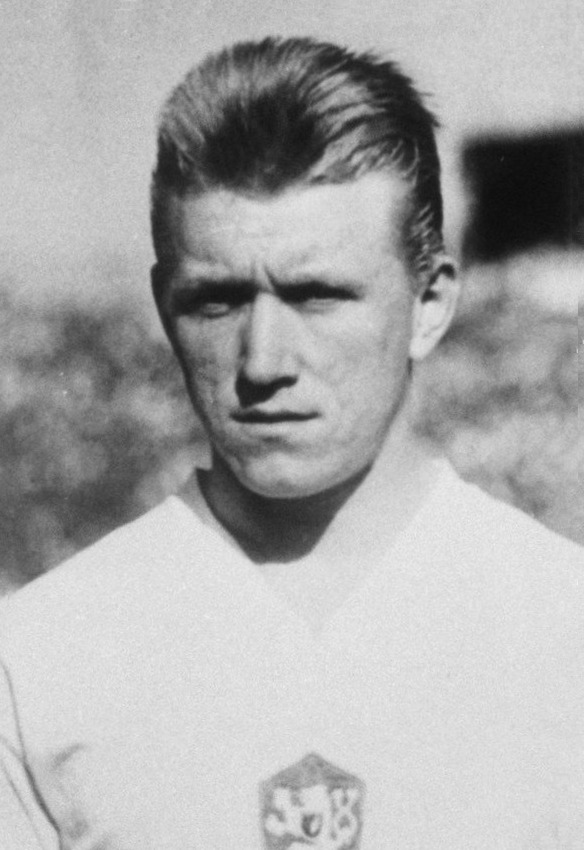
- Jelínek in 1962

Personal information
- Date of birth: 9 January 1941
- Place of birth: Prague, Protectorate of Bohemia and Moravia
- Date of death: 29 November 2024 (aged 83)
- Place of death: Czech Republic
- Position: Forward

Youth career
- 1950–1958: ČAFC Prague

Senior career*
Years	Team	Apps	(Gls)
1958–1967	Dukla Prague	144	(41)
1967–1969	VTŽ Chomutov		
1970–1971	Go Ahead Eagles	22	(2)
1973–1975	Bohemians Prague	33	(2)

International career
1961–1962	Czechoslovakia	10	(2)
Medal record
Men's football
Representing Czechoslovakia
FIFA World Cup
Runner-up	1962 Chile
- * Club domestic league appearances and goals

Josef Jelínek (9 January 1941 – 29 November 2024) was a Czech footballer who played as a forward. He made 10 appearances for the Czechoslovakia national team, scoring twice.

== Life and career ==
Jelínek was a participant in the 1962 FIFA World Cup, where Czechoslovakia won the silver medal. He was the last surviving Czechoslovak player who participated in the 1962 World Cup final.

In his country he spent his best years playing for Dukla Prague. He won the Czechoslovak First League five times with Dukla; and the Czechoslovak Cup three times.

He had a spell with Go Ahead Eagles in the Dutch Eredivisie.

Jelínek died on 29 November 2024, at the age of 83.
