= Vlčkovce =

- Municipality
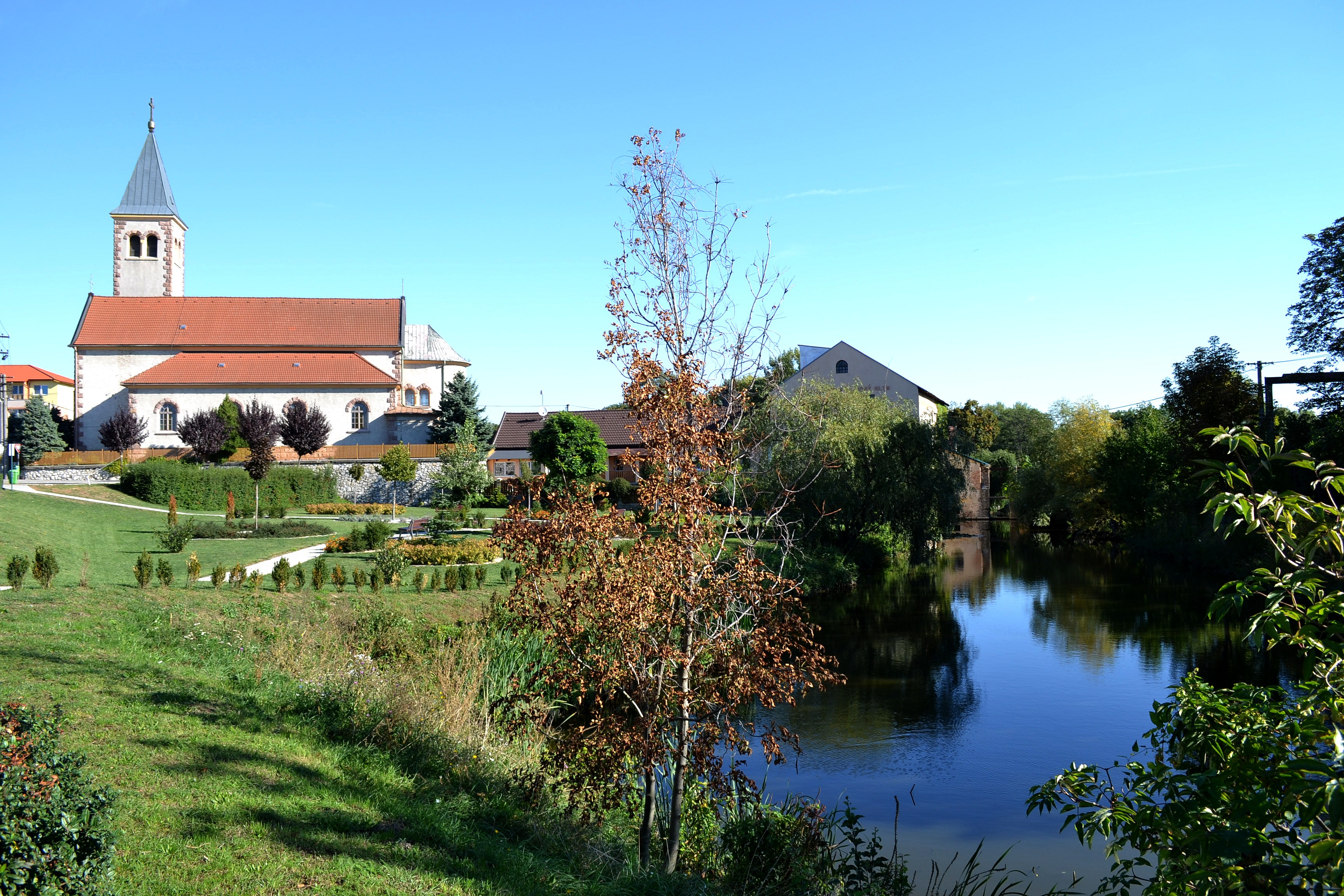
- Church of Saint Theresa of Lisieux in Vlčkovce

- Flag

- Location of Vlčkovce in the Trnava Region Location of Vlčkovce in Slovakia
- Coordinates: 48.32°N 17.67°E
- Country: Slovakia
- Region: Trnava Region
- District: Trnava District
- First mentioned: 1347

Area
  - Total: 12.86 km^{2} (4.97 sq mi)
- Elevation: 132 m (433 ft)

Population (2025)
  - Total: 1,369
- Time zone: UTC+1 (CET)
  - Summer (DST): UTC+2 (CEST)
- Postal code: 919 23
- Area code: +421 33
- Vehicle registration plate (until 2022): TT
- Website: www.vlckovce.sk

Vlčkovce (until 1948: Farkašín; Hungarian: Farkashida) is a village and municipality of Trnava District in the Trnava Region of Slovakia.

== Geography ==
The municipality lies at an altitude of 132 metres (433 ft) and covers an area of 12.86 km^{2} (4.97 sq mi) (2025).

== Population ==
Population statistic (10 years)
Year	1995	2005	2015	2025
Count	1139	1153	1332	1369
Difference		+1.22%	+15.52%	+2.77%

Population statistic
Year	2024	2025
Count	1347	1369
Difference		+1.63%

It has a population of 1369 people (31 December 2025).

=== Ethnicity ===
Census 2021 (1+ %)
Ethnicity	Number	Fraction
Slovak	1261	94.24%
Not found out	68	5.08%
Total	1338	

In year 2021 was 1338 people by ethnicity 1261 as Slovak, 68 as Not found out, 5 as Hungarian, 4 as Czech, 3 as Rusyn, 3 as German, 2 as Ukrainian, 2 as Romani, 2 as Russian, 2 as Romanian, 1 as Polish and 1 as French.

Note on population: The difference values of population numbers in the table "Population statistic" and in the sections "Ethnicity" & "Religion" is caused by the use of various statistical methods.

=== Religion ===
Census 2021 (1+ %)
Religion	Number	Fraction
Roman Catholic Church	878	65.62%
None	330	24.66%
Not found out	70	5.23%
Evangelical Church	22	1.64%
Total	1338	

In year 2021 was 1338 people by religion 878 from Roman Catholic Church, 330 from None, 70 from Not found out, 22 from Evangelical Church, 12 from Greek Catholic Church, 6 from Calvinist Church, 6 from Ad hoc movements, 5 from Eastern Orthodox Church, 5 from Christian Congregations in Slovakia, 3 from Other and 1 from Other and not ascertained christian church.
