= Vladimír Táborský =

Czech footballer

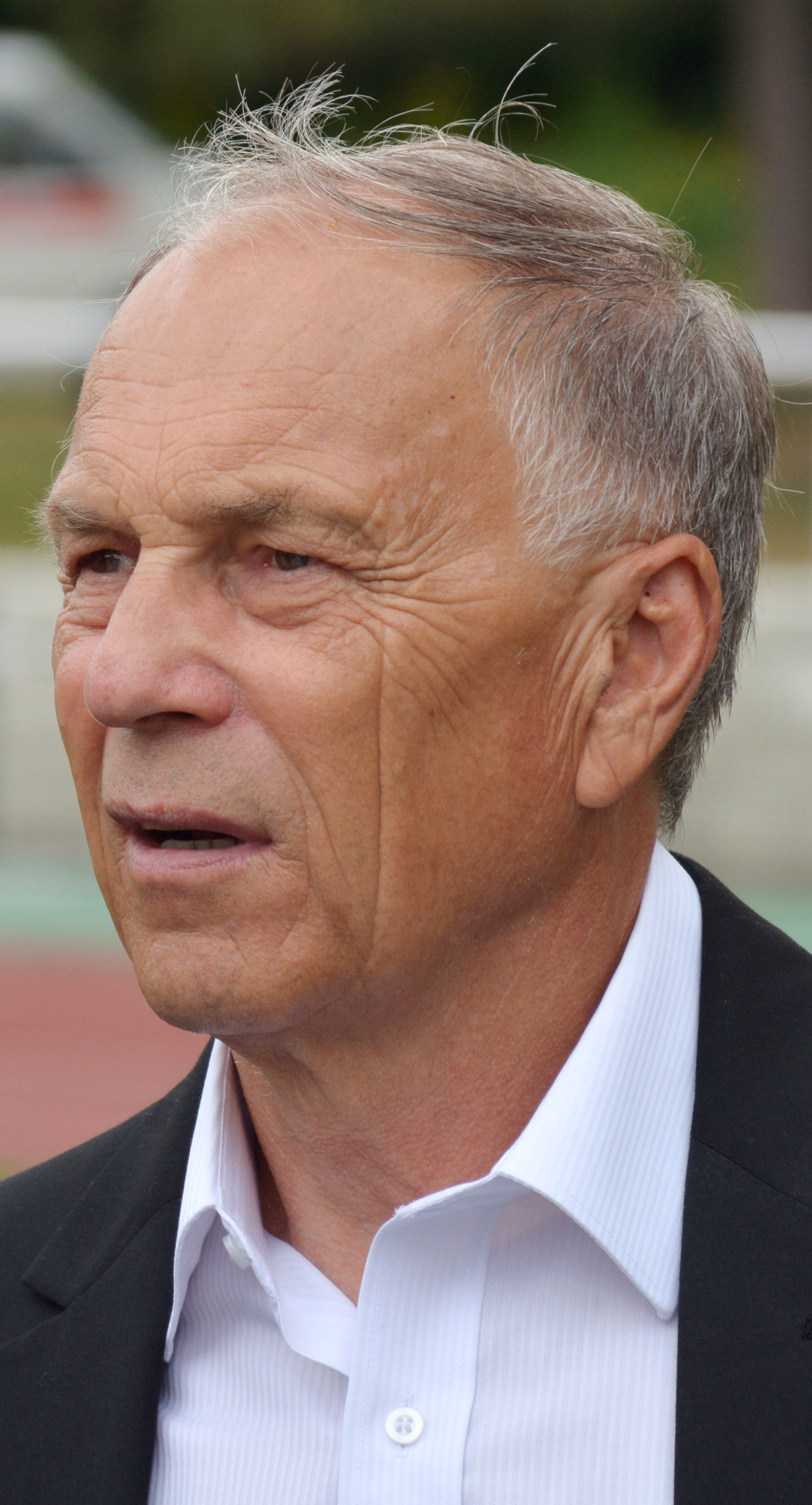

Personal information
- Date of birth: 28 April 1944 (age 82)
- Place of birth: Prague, Protectorate of Bohemia and Moravia
- Position: Defender

Youth career
- 1955–1962: Sparta Prague

Senior career*
Years	Team	Apps	(Gls)
1962–1965	Sparta Prague		
1965–1967	Dukla Prague		
1967–1975	Sparta Prague		
1975–1979	Admira Prague		

International career
1966–1972	Czechoslovakia	19	(1)

Managerial career
- Motorlet Prague (Youth)
- 1979–1981: VTJ Tábor
- 1981–1984: Sparta Prague (Assistant)
- 1984–1985: Sparta Prague
- 1985–1986: Panserraikos
- 1986: Apollon Kalamarias
- 1988–1989: AEL
- 1992: Skoda Xanthi
- 1992–1993: Panserraikos
- 1993: FK Viktoria Žižkov
- 1993–1994: FC Boby Brno
- 1994–1995: Panserraikos
- 1995–1996: Skoda Xanthi (Techn. Director)
- 1996–1997: SK Hradec Králové
- 1999–2000: Panserraikos
- 2000–2001: AO Patraikos
- * Club domestic league appearances and goals

Vladimír Táborský (born 28 April 1944) is a retired Czech football player. He played for Czechoslovakia, for whom he played 19 matches.

In his country he played for Sparta Prague.
