= Guillermo Sepúlveda =

Mexican footballer (1934–2021)

Personal information
- Full name: Guillermo Sepúlveda Rodríguez
- Date of birth: 29 November 1934
- Place of birth: Guadalajara, Jalisco, Mexico
- Date of death: 19 May 2021 (aged 86)
- Height: 1.76 m (5 ft 9 in)
- Position: Defender

Senior career*
Years	Team	Apps	(Gls)
1953–1966	Guadalajara		
1966–1968	Jabatos de Nuevo León		
1968–1969	Oro		

International career
1957–1966	Mexico	30	(0)
- * Club domestic league appearances and goals

Guillermo Sepúlveda Rodríguez (29 November 1934 – 19 May 2021) was a Mexican professional footballer who played as a defender for Mexico in the 1958 and 1962 FIFA World Cups. At club level, he spent most of his career with Guadalajara.

Sepúlveda died aged 87 on 19 May 2021.
