= Jozef Štibrányi =

Slovak footballer

Personal information
- Full name: Jozef Štibrányi
- Date of birth: 11 January 1940 (age 86)
- Place of birth: Farkašín, Slovakia
- Position: Right winger

Youth career
- TJ Vlčkovce
- FC Spartak Trnava

Senior career*
Years	Team	Apps	(Gls)
1960–1963	FC Spartak Trnava	112	(15)
- Dukla Praha
- Dukla Tábor
1966–1970	FC Vítkovice		
- Križovany

International career
1960–1963	Czechoslovakia	9	(1)
Medal record
Men's football
Representing Czechoslovakia
FIFA World Cup
Runner-up	1962 Chile
- * Club domestic league appearances and goals

Jozef Štibrányi (born 11 January 1940 in Farkašín (now Vlčkovce)) is a former Slovak football player. He is nicknamed Vasil.

During his club career he mostly played for FC Spartak Trnava. He earned 9 caps for the Czechoslovakia national football team, and was part of the second-placed team at the 1962 FIFA World Cup, where he scored one goal.
