= Nikolay Latyshev =

Russian football referee (1913–1999)

Nikolay Gavrilovich Latyshev
- Born: 22 November 1913
- Died: 18 February 1999 (aged 85)
- Other occupation: footballer
Years		Role
1947–1962		Referee

International
Years	League	Role
1952–1962	FIFA-listed	Referee

Nikolay Gavrilovich Latyshev (Russian: Николай Гаврилович Латышев; November 22, 1913 – February 18, 1999) was the referee in the 1962 FIFA World Cup final staged in Santiago between Brazil and Czechoslovakia.

He was the first FIFA referee from the Soviet Union (since 1952), as well as the first Soviet to be appointed to officiate in a World Cup final.

Prior to the referee career, Latyshev played for FC Elektrozavod, Stalinets, and Dynamo Moscow.

== Major matches refereed ==
Date	Match	Tournament	Venue	Result	Ref
17 June 1962	Brazil vs. Czechoslovakia	1962 FIFA World Cup final	Estadio Nacional, Santiago	3–1	

Sporting positions (Soviet Union) Nikolay Latyshev
Preceded by 1958 FIFA World Cup Final (France); Maurice Guigue	1962 FIFA World Cup Final Referee	Succeeded by 1966 FIFA World Cup Final (Switzerland); Gottfried Dienst
