= Jan Lála =

Czech footballer (1938–2025)

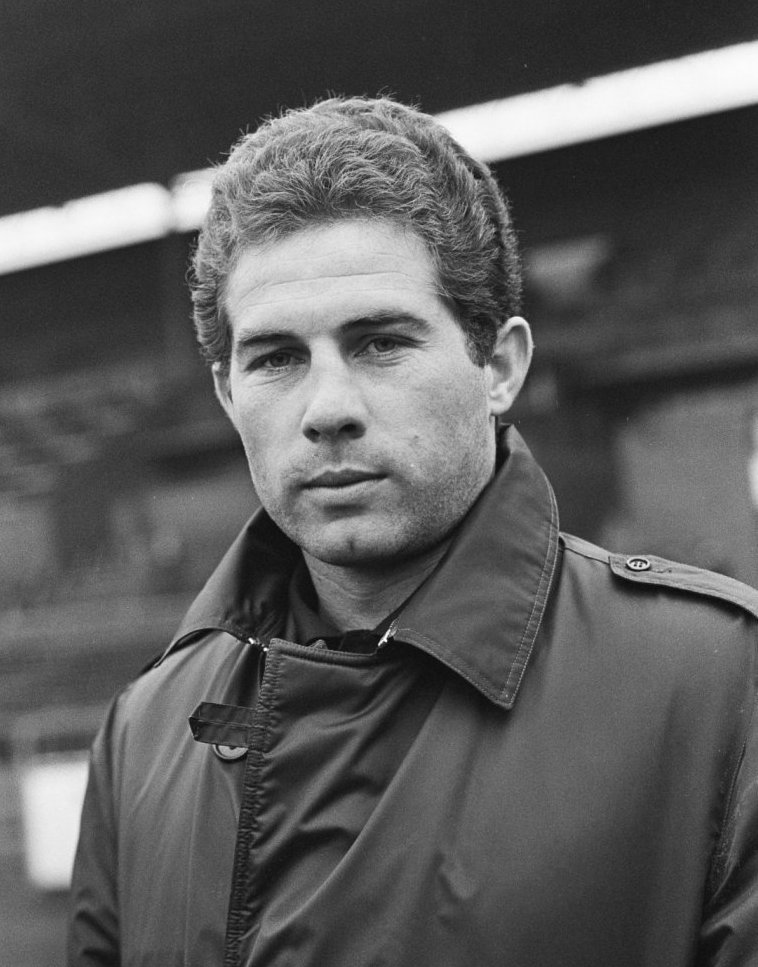
- Lála in 1966

Personal information
- Date of birth: 10 September 1938
- Place of birth: Libická Lhotka, Czechoslovakia
- Date of death: 20 September 2025 (aged 87)
- Height: 1.74 m (5 ft 9 in)
- Position: Right-back

Youth career
- Meteor Žižkov
- Čechie Karlín

Senior career*
| Years | Team | Apps | (Gls) |
| 1955–1957 | Slavia Prague | | |
| 1958–1960 | Dukla Pardubice | | |
| 1960–1969 | Slavia Prague | | |
| 1969–1973 | Lausanne Sport | 92 | (3) |
| 1973–1975 | Spartak Ústí nad Labem | | |

International career
| 1962–1967 | Czechoslovakia | 37 | (1) |
Medal record
Men's football
Representing Czechoslovakia
FIFA World Cup
| Runner-up | 1962 Chile |
- * Club domestic league appearances and goals

Jan Lála (10 September 1938 – 20 September 2025) was a Czech footballer who played as a right-back, spending most of his career with Slavia Prague. At international level, he made 37 appearances and scored one goal for the Czechoslovakia. Lála participated in the 1962 FIFA World Cup, where Czechoslovakia won the silver medal.

Lála died on 20 September 2025, at the age of 87.
