= Pedro Nájera =

Mexican footballer (1929–2020)

Personal information
- Full name: Pedro Nájera Pacheco
- Date of birth: 3 February 1929
- Place of birth: Mexico City, Mexico
- Date of death: 22 August 2020 (aged 91)
- Position: Midfielder

Senior career*
Years	Team	Apps	(Gls)
- Club América

International career
1956–1962	Mexico	27	(0)
- * Club domestic league appearances and goals

Pedro Nájera Pacheco (3 February 1929 – 22 August 2020) was a Mexican football midfielder.

== Life and career ==
He played for Mexico national team in two FIFA World Cup tournaments (1954 and 1962). He also played for Club América.
