= 1964–65 Czechoslovak First League =

Czechoslovak First League
- Season: 1964–65
- Champions: Sparta Prague
- Relegated: SONP Kladno; FC Bohemians Praha; Jiskra Otrokovice
- European Cup: Sparta Prague
- Cup Winners' Cup: Dukla Prague
- Fairs Cup: Spartak ZJŠ Brno
- Top goalscorer: Pavol Bencz (21 goals)

Statistics of Czechoslovak First League in the 1964–65 season.

== Overview ==
It was contested by 14 teams, and Sparta Prague won the championship. Pavol Bencz was the league's top scorer with 21 goals.

== Stadia and locations ==
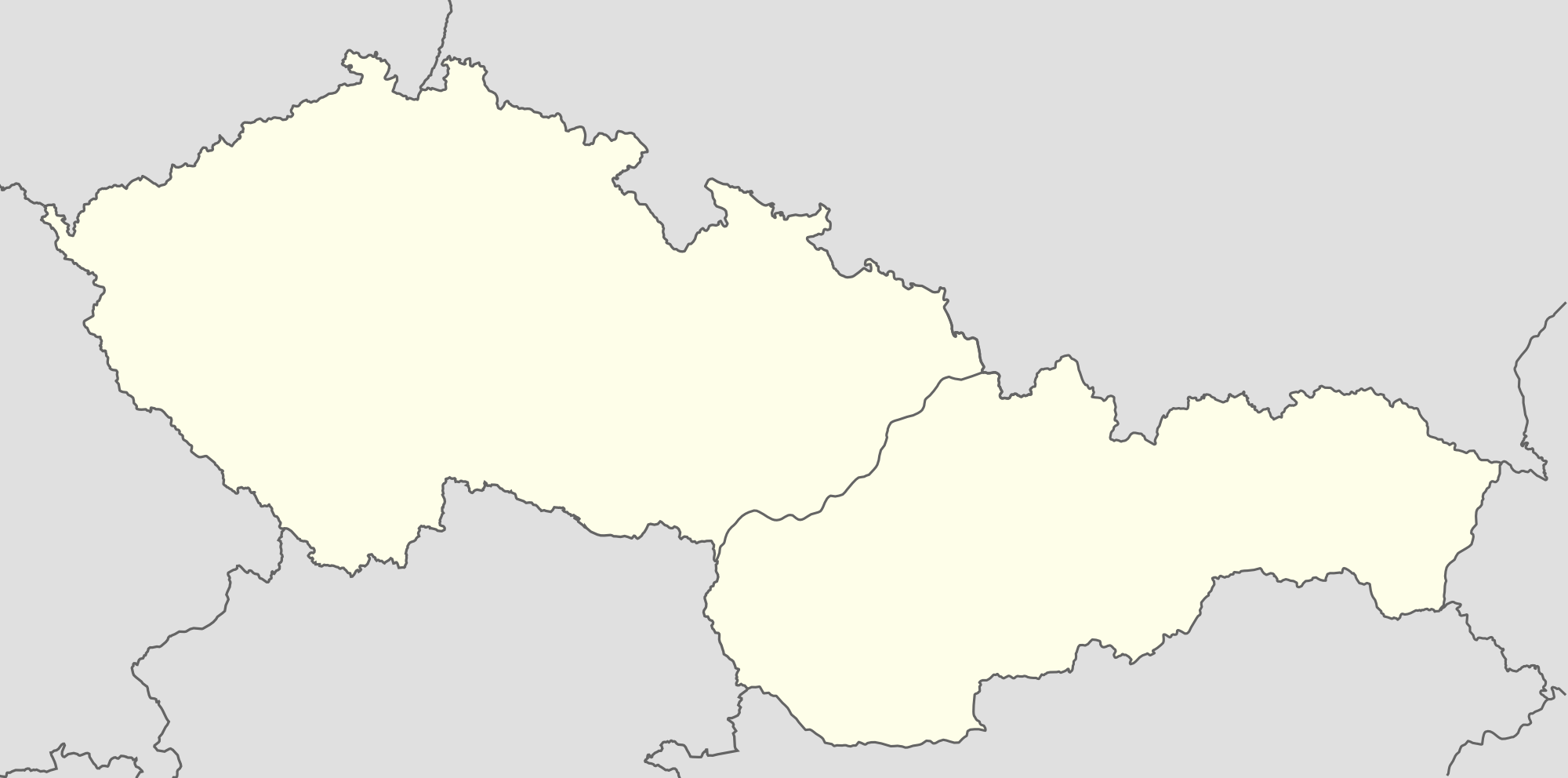
Location of clubs in the 1964–65 Czechoslovak First League

== League standings ==
| Pos | Team | Pld | W | D | L | GF | GA | GR | Pts | Qualification or relegation |
|---|---|---|---|---|---|---|---|---|---|---|
| 1 | Sparta Prague (C) | 26 | 18 | 6 | 2 | 59 | 22 | 2.682 | 40 (Note: Sparta Prague has two points deducted.) | Qualification for European Cup first round |
| 2 | Tatran Prešov | 26 | 15 | 3 | 8 | 38 | 22 | 1.727 | 33 | |
| 3 | VSS Košice | 26 | 11 | 8 | 7 | 35 | 31 | 1.129 | 30 | |
| 4 | Slovnaft Bratislava | 26 | 11 | 7 | 8 | 33 | 22 | 1.500 | 29 | |
| 5 | Jednota Trenčín | 26 | 13 | 3 | 10 | 47 | 33 | 1.424 | 29 | |
| 6 | Slovan Bratislava | 26 | 7 | 14 | 5 | 35 | 26 | 1.346 | 28 | |
| 7 | Baník Ostrava | 26 | 11 | 6 | 9 | 44 | 33 | 1.333 | 28 | |
| 8 | Dukla Prague | 26 | 9 | 9 | 8 | 37 | 24 | 1.542 | 27 | Qualification for Cup Winners' Cup first round |
| 9 | Slovan Teplice | 26 | 12 | 1 | 13 | 31 | 53 | 0.585 | 25 | |
| 10 | Spartak Trnava | 26 | 8 | 8 | 10 | 33 | 36 | 0.917 | 24 | |
| 11 | Spartak ZJŠ Brno | 26 | 7 | 10 | 9 | 19 | 26 | 0.731 | 24 | Invitation for Inter-Cities Fairs Cup first round |
| 12 | SONP Kladno (R) | 26 | 6 | 6 | 14 | 31 | 44 | 0.705 | 18 | Relegation to Czechoslovak Second League |
| 13 | Bohemians Prague (R) | 26 | 5 | 7 | 14 | 29 | 48 | 0.604 | 17 | Relegation to Czechoslovak Second League |
| 14 | Jiskra Otrokovice (R) | 26 | 2 | 6 | 18 | 20 | 71 | 0.282 | 10 | Relegation to Czechoslovak Second League |

Source: rsssf.com
(C) Champions; (R) Relegated

== Results ==
| Home \ Away | OST | BOH | DUK | TRE | OTR | SLO | TEP | SLV | KLA | SPA | TRN | BRN | PRE | KOŠ |
|---|---|---|---|---|---|---|---|---|---|---|---|---|---|---|
| Baník Ostrava | | 1–0 | 2–1 | 0–0 | 6–0 | 0–0 | 6–0 | 0–0 | 5–2 | 1–1 | 2–2 | 4–0 | 1–0 | 0–0 |
| Bohemians Prague | 1–0 | | 2–1 | 3–1 | 4–1 | 0–4 | 1–2 | 1–5 | 2–2 | 0–2 | 1–1 | 0–0 | 2–3 | 0–0 |
| Dukla Prague | 1–0 | 5–1 | | 3–1 | 7–0 | 1–1 | 2–1 | 0–0 | 5–2 | 1–2 | 1–1 | 0–0 | 1–1 | 2–0 |
| Jednota Trenčín | 3–1 | 2–1 | 2–0 | | 5–2 | 4–1 | 3–0 | 1–2 | 1–1 | 0–1 | 3–1 | 1–3 | 2–0 | 4–0 |
| Jiskra Otrokovice | 1–2 | 3–6 | 0–0 | 1–2 | | 0–0 | 5–0 | 1–0 | 0–1 | 0–4 | 0–1 | 0–0 | 0–1 | 0–0 |
| Slovan Bratislava | 2–0 | 4–0 | 0–0 | 2–0 | 4–1 | | 2–0 | 0–0 | 1–1 | 0–0 | 1–2 | 2–2 | 2–0 | 0–0 |
| Slovan Teplice | 0–1 | 2–2 | 2–0 | 0–4 | 5–0 | 3–0 | | 1–0 | 1–0 | 1–4 | 3–1 | 1–0 | 0–2 | 3–2 |
| Slovnaft Bratislava | 0–4 | 2–1 | 1–0 | 1–0 | 6–0 | 2–2 | 3–0 | | 2–0 | 0–0 | 0–0 | 1–0 | 1–2 | 2–0 |
| SONP Kladno | 2–3 | 1–0 | 0–2 | 1–4 | 4–0 | 1–1 | 1–2 | 0–2 | | 1–2 | 4–0 | 0–1 | 1–0 | 3–2 |
| Sparta Prague | 4–2 | 1–0 | 2–2 | 1–2 | 4–2 | 2–2 | 6–0 | 2–1 | 1–0 | | 6–3 | 3–0 | 1–0 | 4–0 |
| Spartak Trnava | 3–2 | 0–0 | 0–2 | 3–1 | 5–0 | 1–1 | 1–2 | 2–0 | 1–1 | 0–1 | | 1–0 | 3–0 | 0–0 |
| Spartak ZJŠ Brno | 2–0 | 0–0 | 0–0 | 1–1 | 1–0 | 1–0 | 0–1 | 1–1 | 2–2 | 1–3 | 1–0 | | 1–0 | 1–1 |
| Tatran Prešov | 5–1 | 3–0 | 1–0 | 1–0 | 0–0 | 1–1 | 6–1 | 1–0 | 2–0 | 1–0 | 2–1 | 3–1 | | 2–0 |
| VSS Košice | 3–0 | 2–1 | 2–0 | 3–0 | 3–3 | 4–2 | 1–0 | 3–1 | 2–0 | 2–2 | 2–0 | 1–0 | 2–1 | |

Source: statistiky1ligy.fotbal.cz
Legend: Blue = home team win; Yellow = draw; Red = away team win.
