= Alfredo del Águila =

Mexican footballer (1935–2018)

Personal information
- Full name: Alfredo del Águila Estrella
- Date of birth: 3 January 1935
- Place of birth: Mexico
- Date of death: 26 July 2018 (aged 83)
- Position: Forward

Senior career*
Years	Team	Apps	(Gls)
- Deportivo Toluca

International career
1956–1967	Mexico	31	(2)
- * Club domestic league appearances and goals

Alfredo del Águila Estrella (3 January 1935 – 26 July 2018) was a Mexican football forward who played for Mexico in the 1962 FIFA World Cup. He also played for Deportivo Toluca and Club de Futbol America.
