= Héctor Hernández (footballer, born 1935) =

Mexican footballer (1935–1984

Personal information
- Full name: Héctor Hernández García
- Date of birth: 6 December 1935
- Place of birth: Mexico
- Date of death: 15 June 1984 (aged 48)
- Position: Forward

Senior career*
Years	Team	Apps	(Gls)
- Guadalajara

International career
1957–1962	Mexico	18	(12)
- * Club domestic league appearances and goals

Héctor Hernández García (6 December 1935 – 15 June 1984) was a Mexican professional footballer who played as a forward.

== Life and career ==
He was born in Mexico. He played for Selección de fútbol de México (Mexico national team) in the 1962 FIFA World Cup. He also played for Guadalajara.

=== International goals ===
Scores and results list Mexico's goal tally first.

No	Date	Venue	Opponent	Score	Result	Competition
1.	28 April 1957	Veterans Memorial Stadium, Long Beach, United States	United States	4–2	7–2	1958 FIFA World Cup qualification
2.	28 April 1957	Veterans Memorial Stadium, Long Beach, United States	United States	7–2	7–2	1958 FIFA World Cup qualification
3.	1 March 1959	Estadio Olímpico Universitario, Mexico City, Mexico	Costa Rica	1–0	3–1	Friendly
4.	1 March 1959	Estadio Olímpico Universitario, Mexico City, Mexico	Costa Rica	2–0	3–1	Friendly
5.	1 March 1959	Estadio Olímpico Universitario, Mexico City, Mexico	Costa Rica	3–0	3–1	Friendly
6.	8 March 1959	Estadio Nacional de Costa Rica, San José, Costa Rica	Costa Rica	1–0	2–1	Friendly
7.	8 March 1959	Estadio Nacional de Costa Rica, San José, Costa Rica	Costa Rica	2–1	2–1	Friendly
8.	10 March 1960	Estadio Nacional de Costa, San José, Costa Rica	Argentina	1–2	2–3	1960 Panamerican Championship
9.	13 March 1960	Estadio Nacional de Costa, San José, Costa Rica	Costa Rica	1–1	1–1	1960 Panamerican Championship
10.	26 June 1960	Estadio Olímpico Universitario, Mexico City, Mexico	Netherlands	1–0	3–1	Friendly
11.	4 April 1962	Estadio Olímpico Pascual Guerrero, Cali, Colombia	Colombia	1–2	2–2	Friendly
12.	7 June 1962	Estadio Sausalito, Viña del Mar, Chile	Czechoslovakia	3–1	3–1	1962 FIFA World Cup
