= Viliam Schrojf =

Slovak footballer

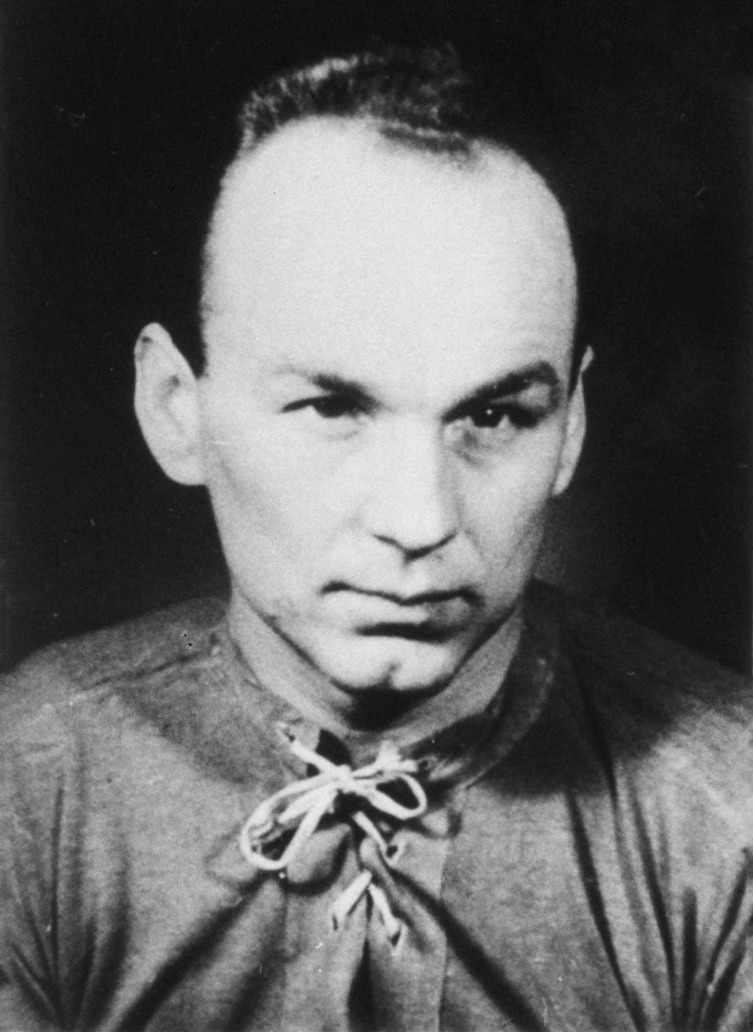
- Schrojf in 1962

Personal information
- Date of birth: 2 August 1931
- Place of birth: Prague, Czechoslovakia
- Date of death: 1 September 2007 (aged 76)
- Place of death: Bratislava, Slovakia
- Height: 1.76 m (5 ft 9 in)
- Position: Goalkeeper

Senior career*
Years	Team	Apps	(Gls)
1952–1954	Křídla vlasti Olomouc		
1955–1965	Slovan Bratislava	240	(0)
1965–1966	Lokomotiva Košice		
1967–1968	Slavia Melbourne		
1969–1973	First Vienna FC		

International career
1953–1965	Czechoslovakia	39	(0)
Medal record
Men's football
Representing Czechoslovakia
FIFA World Cup
Runner-up	1962 Chile
- * Club domestic league appearances and goals

Viliam Schrojf (2 August 1931 – 1 September 2007) was a Slovak footballer who played as a goalkeeper. He received 39 caps for Czechoslovakia.

== Career ==
Schrojf was a participant at the three consecutive World Cups 1954 FIFA World Cup, 1958 FIFA World Cup and at the 1962 FIFA World Cup, where Czechoslovakia surprised the world and went through to the final, losing to champions Brazil. The success of Czechoslovakia was largely attributed to Schrojf's superb performance. The final however proved to be a black day for Schrojf, with two Brazilian goals resulting from his mistakes. With his country leading 1–0, he expected a cross from Amarildo and left the goal, allowing the Brazilian to score from an acute angle. Halfway through the second half, with his side already 2–1 down, the sun got into his eyes and he failed to catch a simple ball properly, which landed directly at the feet of Vavá, who took the opportunity to become the first ever player to score in two different World Cup finals.

On club level, Schrojf played mostly for Slovan Bratislava and then for Lokomotiva Košice.

== Death ==
On 2 September 2007, the Slovak media reported that Schrojf had died the previous day, aged 76; the cause of death was not disclosed.

== Honours ==
Slovan Bratislava

- Czechoslovak First League: 1955
- Czechoslovak Cup: 1961–62, 1962–63

Czechoslovakia

- FIFA World Cup runner-up: 1962

Individual

- FIFA World Cup All-Star Team: 1962
- FIFA World Cup Best Goalkeeper: 1962
