= Isidoro Díaz =

Mexican footballer (born 1938)

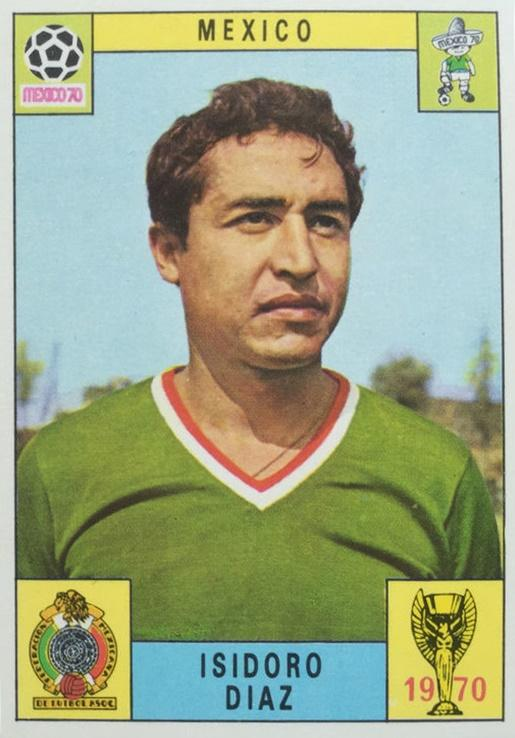
- Díaz in 1970

Personal information
- Full name: Isidoro Díaz Mejía
- Date of birth: 14 February 1938 (age 88)
- Place of birth: Acatlán de Juárez, Jalisco, Mexico
- Height: 1.68 m (5 ft 6 in)
- Position: Midfielder

Senior career*
Years	Team	Apps	(Gls)
1955–1968	Guadalajara	?	(58)
1968–1970	León		
1970–1971	Jalisco		
1971–1972	Naucalpan		

International career
1960–1970	Mexico	68	(17)
- * Club domestic league appearances and goals

Isidoro Díaz Mejía (born 14 February 1938) is a Mexican former professional footballer who played as a midfielder.

== Club career ==
Isidoro Díaz played most of his club career for Guadalajara, where he won 15 titles, including 7 league titles and the first ever edition of the CONCACAF Champions' Cup in 1962.

== International career ==
Díaz represented Mexico in three World Cups (1962, 1966 and 1970). He made 68 appearances for the Mexico national team between 1960 and 1970.

== Honours ==
Guadalajara

- CONCACAF Champions' Cup: 1962
- Mexican Primera División: 1956–57, 1958–59, 1959–60, 1960–61, 1961–62 1963–64, 1965–1966
- Mexican Champions Cup: 1956–57, 1958–59, 1959–60, 1960–61, 1963–64, 1964–65
- Mexican Cup: 1963

== Career statistics ==
=== International goals ===
No.	Date	Venue	Opponent	Score	Result	Competition
1.	March 19, 1960	San José, Costa Rica	Costa Rica	3–0	Win	1960 Panamerican Cup
2.	June 26, 1960	Mexico City, Mexico	Netherlands	3–1	Win	Friendly
3.	November 13, 1960	Mexico City, Mexico	United States	3–0	Win	1962 FIFA World Cup qualification
4.	June 7, 1962	Viña del Mar, Chile	Czechoslovakia	3–1	Win	1962 FIFA World Cup
5.	March 28, 1963	Santa Ana, El Salvador	Jamaica	8–0	Win	1963 CONCACAF Championship
6.	March 28, 1963	Santa Ana, El Salvador	Jamaica	8–0	Win	1963 CONCACAF Championship
7.	February 28, 1965	San Pedro Sula, Honduras	Honduras	1–0	Win	1966 FIFA World Cup qualification
8.	March 12, 1965	Mexico City, Mexico	United States	2–0	Win	1966 FIFA World Cup qualification
9.	March 28, 1965	Guatemala City, Guatemala	El Salvador	2–0	Win	1965 CONCACAF Championship
10.	May 7, 1965	Mexico City, Mexico	Jamaica	8–0	Win	1966 FIFA World Cup qualification
11.	May 7, 1965	Mexico City, Mexico	Jamaica	8–0	Win	1966 FIFA World Cup qualification
12.	May 7, 1965	Mexico City, Mexico	Jamaica	8–0	Win	1966 FIFA World Cup qualification
13.	October 6, 1968	Puebla, Mexico	Czechoslovakia	1–1	Draw	Friendly
14.	October 31, 1968	Rio de Janeiro, Brazil	Brazil	2–1	Win	Friendly
15.	February 15, 1970	Mexico City, Mexico	Bulgaria	1–1	Draw	Friendly
16.	April 22, 1970	Mexico City, Mexico	Romania	1–1	Draw	Friendly
17.	April 29, 1970	León, Mexico	Ecuador	4–2	Win	Friendly
