= Václav Mašek =

Czech footballer

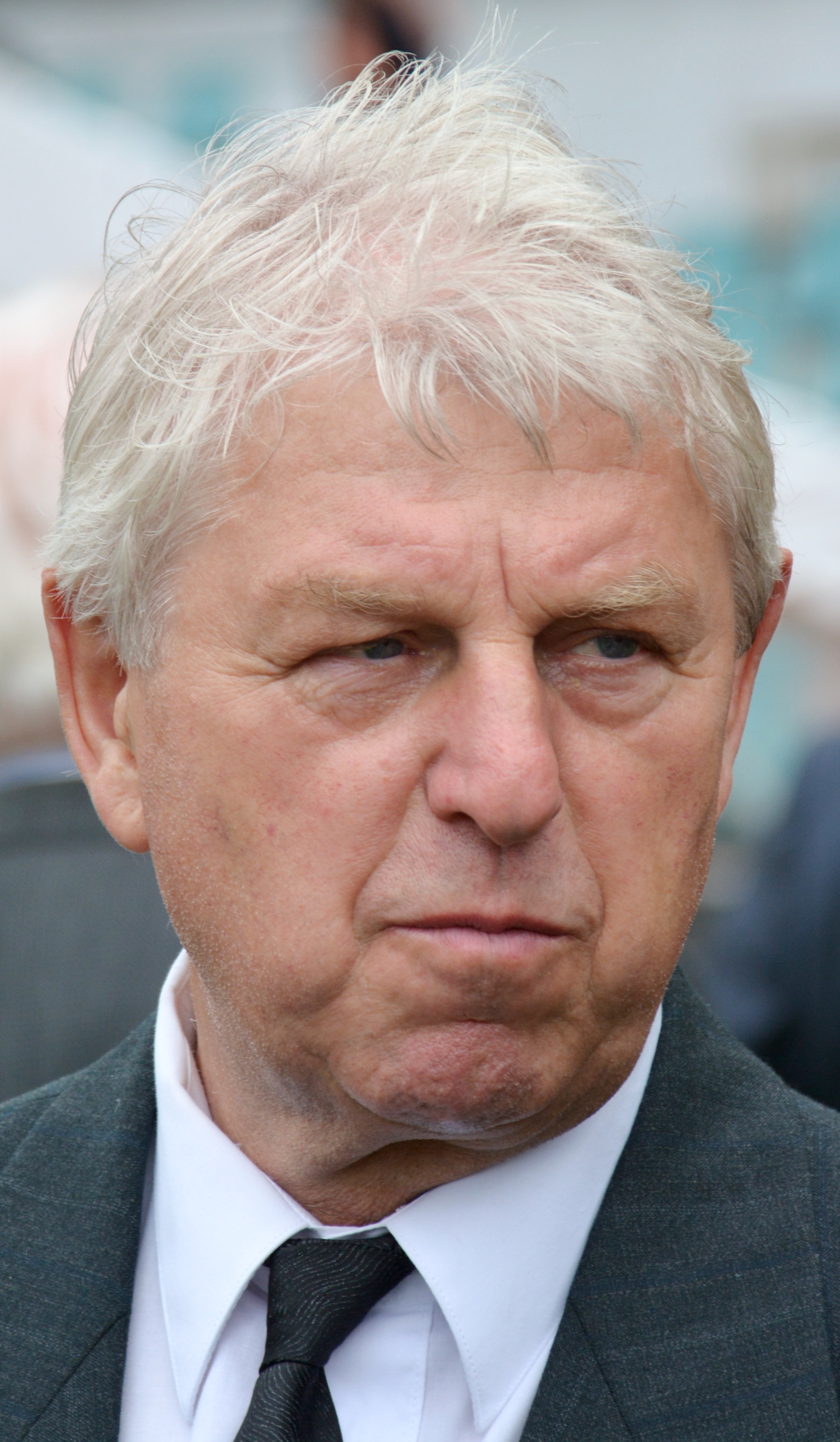
- Mašek in 2015

Personal information
- Date of birth: 21 March 1941 (age 85)
- Place of birth: Prague, Protectorate of Bohemia and Moravia
- Position: Striker

Youth career
- –1957: ABC Braník
- 1957–1958: Sparta Prague

Senior career*
Years	Team	Apps	(Gls)
1958–1970	Sparta Prague	313	(120)
1970–1971	Dukla Prague	7	(1)
1971–1973	Sparta Prague		
1974–1978	ABC Braník		

International career
1960–1965	Czechoslovakia	16	(5)
Medal record
Men's football
Representing Czechoslovakia
FIFA World Cup
Runner-up	1962 Chile
- * Club domestic league appearances and goals

Václav Mašek (born 21 March 1941) is a Czech football player who played as a striker. He was a member of the Czechoslovakia national football team, for which he played 16 matches and scored 5 goals.

In Czechoslovakia, he played 313 league matches and scored 127 goals for Sparta Prague.

He was a participant in the 1962 FIFA World Cup, where his country was runners up, losing to Brazil in the final. In a match against Mexico, he became famous for scoring a goal after only 16 seconds of play, the fastest goal in World Cup history until forty years later, when his record was beaten by Hakan Şükür of Turkey, by scoring after 11 seconds in the 3rd place match of the 2002 FIFA World Cup.

Sporting positions
Preceded by Ernst Lehner	Fastest World Cup Goalscorer; 16 seconds 7 June 1962 – 29 June 2002	Succeeded by Hakan Şükür
