= List of Czech football champions =

The Czech football champions indicates all past winners of the top-tier football leagues in which clubs from Czech Republic were inserted in. It includes the Czechoslovak First League and current Czech First League.

== History ==
Bohemia was an early adopter of football. Football originated in Bohemia in early 1890s, when two of the most famous clubs, Sparta and Slavia, were founded. They met for the first time, for a rivalry later to become known as the Prague derby, in March 1896.

The first Bohemian championship (1896) was won by ČFK Kickers Prague (spring). Deutscher Fußball-Club Prag won the championship in autumn of the same year. In 1897 Slavia were victorious for a number of years until, in 1902, the championship was won by ČAFC Vinohrady. The Czechoslovak First League was the highest football league in Czechoslovakia from 1925 to 1993.

== Champions ==
=== Mistrovství Čech / Mistrovství ČSF (1896–1902) ===
Season	Champions	Runners-up
1896 (spring)	ČFK Kickers Prague	SK Slavia Prague
1896 (autumn)	DFC Prague	AC Sparta Prague
1897 (spring)	SK Slavia Prague	SK Slavia Prague B
1897 (autumn)	SK Slavia Prague	AC Sparta Prague
1898	SK Slavia Prague	AC Sparta Prague
1899	SK Slavia Prague	SK Slavia Prague B
1900	SK Slavia Prague	SK Slavia Prague B
1901	SK Slavia Prague	ČAFC Vinohrady
1902	ČAFC Vinohrady	AFK Karlín

Between 1903 and 1911, there was no competition for the Mistrovstvi Čech.

=== Mistrovství ČSF (1909–1917) ===
Season	Champions	Runners-up
1909	Not held	
1910	Not held	
1911	Not held	
1912	AC Sparta Prague	AFK Kolín
1913	SK Slavia Prague	SK Moravská Slavia Brno
1914	Not held	
1915	SK Slavia Prague	SK Smíchov
1916	Not held	
1917	DFC Prague	Viktoria Žižkov

=== Mistrovství ČSF / Středočeská župa (1918–1924) ===
Season	Champions	Runners-up
1918	SK Slavia Prague	AC Sparta Prague
1919	AC Sparta Prague	SK Kladno
1920	AC Sparta Prague	AFK Vršovice
1921	AC Sparta Prague	AFK Union Žižkov
1922	AC Sparta Prague	SK Hradec Králové
1923	AC Sparta Prague	SK Slavia Prague
1924	SK Slavia Prague	Viktoria Žižkov

=== Czechoslovak First League (1925–1992) ===
Season	Champions	Runners-up	Third place	Top goalscorer(s) (goals)	Club(s)
1925	Slavia Prague	Sparta Prague	Viktoria Žižkov	Jan Vaník (13)	Slavia Prague
1925–26	Sparta Prague	Slavia Prague	Viktoria Žižkov	Jan Dvořáček (32)	Sparta Prague
1927	Sparta Prague	Slavia Prague	Vršovice	Antonín Puč (13); Josef Šíma (13)	Slavia Prague; Sparta Prague
1927–28	Viktoria Žižkov	Slavia Prague	Sparta Prague	Karel Meduna (12)	Viktoria Žižkov
1928–29	Slavia Prague	Viktoria Žižkov	Sparta Prague	Antonín Puč (13)	Slavia Prague
1929–30	Slavia Prague	Sparta Prague	Viktoria Žižkov	František Kloz (15)	Kladno
1930–31	Slavia Prague	Sparta Prague	Bohemians Vršovice	Josef Silný (18)	Sparta Prague
1931–32	Sparta Prague	Slavia Prague	Bohemians Vršovice	Raymond Braine (16)	Sparta Prague
1932–33	Slavia Prague	Sparta Prague	Viktoria Plzeň	Gejza Kocsis (23)	Teplitzer FK / Bohemians Prague
1933–34	Slavia Prague	Sparta Prague	Kladno	Raymond Braine (18); Jiří Sobotka (18)	Sparta Prague; Slavia Prague
1934–35	Slavia Prague	Sparta Prague	Židenice	František Svoboda (27)	Slavia Prague
1935–36	Sparta Prague	Slavia Prague	Prostějov	Vojtěch Bradáč (42)	Slavia Prague
1936–37	Slavia Prague	Sparta Prague	Prostějov	František Kloz (28)	Kladno
1937–38	Sparta Prague	Slavia Prague	Židenice	Josef Bican (22)	Slavia Prague
1938–39	Sparta Prague	Slavia Prague	SK Pardubice	Josef Bican (29)	Slavia Prague
1939–40	Slavia Prague	Sparta Prague	SK Pardubice	Josef Bican (50)	Slavia Prague
1940–41	Slavia Prague	SK Plzeň	SK Pardubice	Josef Bican (38)	Slavia Prague
1941–42	Slavia Prague	SK Prostějov	Viktoria Plzeň	Josef Bican (45)	Slavia Prague
1942–43	Slavia Prague	Sparta Prague	Baťa Zlín	Josef Bican (39)	Slavia Prague
1943–44	Sparta Prague	Slavia Prague	Baťa Zlín	Josef Bican (57)	Slavia Prague
1945–46	Sparta Prague	Slavia Prague	–	Josef Bican (31)	Slavia Prague
1946–47	Slavia Prague	Sparta Prague	Kladno	Josef Bican (43)	Slavia Prague
1947–48	Sparta Prague	Slavia Prague	Bratislava	Jaroslav Cejp (21)	Sparta Prague
1948	not completed			Josef Bican (21)	Slavia Prague
1949	NV Bratislava	Bratrstvi Sparta	Železničáři Prague	Ladislav Hlaváček (28)	Slavia Prague
1950	NV Bratislava	Bratrstvi Sparta	Železničáři Prague	Josef Bican (22)	Vítkovické železárny
1951	NV Bratislava	Sparta CKD Sokolovo	Dynamo ČSD Košice	Alois Jaroš (16)	Vodotechna Teplice
1952	Sparta CKD Sokolovo	NV Bratislava	Ingstav Teplice	Miroslav Wiecek (20)	OKD Ostrava
1953	ÚDA Prague	Spartak Praga Sokolovo	ČH Bratislava	Josef Majer (13)	Baník Kladno
1954	Spartak Praga Sokolovo	Baník Ostrava	ČH Bratislava	Jiří Pešek (13)	Spartak Praga Sokolovo
1955	Slovan Bratislava	ÚDA Prague	Spartak Praga Sokolovo	Emil Pažický (9)	Slovan Bratislava / Iskra Žilina
1956	Dukla Prague	Slovan Bratislava	Spartak Praga Sokolovo	Milan Dvořák (15); Miroslav Wiecek (15)	Dukla Prague; Baník Ostrava
1957–58	Dukla Prague	Spartak Praga Sokolovo	ČH Bratislava	Miroslav Wiecek (25)	Baník Ostrava
1958–59	ČH Bratislava	Dukla Prague	Dynamo Prague	Miroslav Wiecek (20)	Baník Ostrava
1959–60	Spartak Hradec Kralové	Slovan Bratislava	Dukla Prague	Michal Pucher (18)	Slovan Nitra
1960–61	Dukla Prague	ČH Bratislava	Slovan Bratislava	Rudolf Kučera (17); Ladislav Pavlovič (17)	Dukla Prague; Tatran Prešov
1961–62	Dukla Prague	Slovan Nitra	ČH Bratislava	Adolf Scherer (24)	ČH Bratislava
1962–63	Dukla Prague	Jednota Trenčín	Baník Ostrava	Karel Petroš (19)	Tatran Prešov
1963–64	Dukla Prague	Slovan Bratislava	Tatran Prešov	Ladislav Pavlovič (21)	Tatran Prešov
1964–65	Sparta Prague	Tatran Prešov	VSS Košice	Pavol Bencz (21)	Jednota Trenčín
1965–66	Dukla Prague	Sparta Prague	Slavia Prague	Ladislav Michalík (15)	Baník Ostrava
1966–67	Sparta Prague	Slovan Bratislava	Spartak Trnava	Jozef Adamec (21)	Spartak Trnava
1967–68	Spartak Trnava	Slovan Bratislava	Jednota Trenčín	Jozef Adamec (18)	Spartak Trnava
1968–69	Spartak Trnava	Slovan Bratislava	Sparta Prague	Ladislav Petráš (20)	Dukla Banská Bystrica
1969–70	Slovan Bratislava	Spartak Trnava	Sparta Prague	Jozef Adamec (18)	Spartak Trnava
1970–71	Spartak Trnava	VSS Košice	Union Teplice	Jozef Adamec (16); Zdeněk Nehoda (16)	Spartak Trnava; TJ Gottwaldov
1971–72	Spartak Trnava	Slovan Bratislava	Dukla Prague	Ján Čapkovič (19)	Slovan Bratislava
1972–73	Spartak Trnava	Tatran Prešov	VSS Košice	Ladislav Józsa (21)	Lokomotíva Košice
1973–74	Slovan Bratislava	Dukla Prague	Slavia Prague	Ladislav Józsa (17); Přemysl Bičovský (17)	Lokomotíva Košice; Sklo Union Teplice
1974–75	Slovan Bratislava	Inter Bratislava	Bohemians Prague	Ladislav Petráš (20)	Inter Bratislava
1975–76	Baník Ostrava	Slovan Bratislava	Slavia Prague	Dušan Galis (21)	VSS Košice
1976–77	Dukla Prague	Inter Bratislava	Slavia Prague	Ladislav Józsa (18)	Lokomotíva Košice
1977–78	Zbrojovka Brno	Dukla Prague	Lokomotíva Košice	Karel Kroupa (20)	Zbrojovka Brno
1978–79	Dukla Prague	Baník Ostrava	Zbrojovka Brno	Karel Kroupa (17); Zdeněk Nehoda (17)	Zbrojovka Brno; Dukla Prague
1979–80	Baník Ostrava	Zbrojovka Brno	Bohemians Prague	Werner Lička (18)	Baník Ostrava
1980–81	Baník Ostrava	Dukla Prague	Bohemians Prague	Marián Masný (16)	Slovan Bratislava
1981–82	Dukla Prague	Baník Ostrava	Bohemians Prague	Peter Herda (15); Ladislav Vízek (15)	Slavia Prague; Dukla Prague
1982–83	Bohemians Prague	Baník Ostrava	Sparta Prague	Pavel Chaloupka (17)	Bohemians Prague
1983–84	Sparta Prague	Dukla Prague	Bohemians Prague	Werner Lička (20)	Baník Ostrava
1984–85	Sparta Prague	Bohemians Prague	Slavia Prague	Ivo Knoflíček (21)	Slavia Prague
1985–86	TJ Vítkovice	Sparta Prague	Dukla Prague	Stanislav Griga (19)	Sparta Prague
1986–87	Sparta Prague	TJ Vítkovice	Bohemians Prague	Václav Daněk (24)	Baník Ostrava
1987–88	Sparta Prague	Dukla Prague	DAC 1904 Dunajská Streda	Milan Luhový (24)	Dukla Prague
1988–89	Sparta Prague	Baník Ostrava	Plastika Nitra	Milan Luhový (25)	Dukla Prague
1989–90	Sparta Prague	Baník Ostrava	Inter Bratislava	Ľubomír Luhový (20)	Inter Bratislava
1990–91	Sparta Prague	Slovan Bratislava	Sigma Olomouc	Roman Kukleta (17)	Sparta Prague
1991–92	Slovan Bratislava	Sparta Prague	Sigma Olomouc	Peter Dubovský (27)	Slovan Bratislava
1992–93	Sparta Prague	Slavia Prague	Slovan Bratislava	Peter Dubovský (24)	Slovan Bratislava

=== Czech First League (1993–present) ===
Season	Champions	Runners-up	Third place	Top goalscorer(s) (goals)	Club(s)
1993–94	Sparta Prague (1)	Slavia Prague	Baník Ostrava	Horst Siegl (20)	Sparta Prague
1994–95	Sparta Prague (2)	Slavia Prague	Boby Brno	Radek Drulák (15)	Drnovice
1995–96	Slavia Prague (1)	Sigma Olomouc	Jablonec	Radek Drulák (22)	Drnovice
1996–97	Sparta Prague (3)	Slavia Prague	Jablonec	Horst Siegl (19)	Sparta Prague
1997–98	Sparta Prague (4)	Slavia Prague	Sigma Olomouc	Horst Siegl (13)	Sparta Prague
1998–99	Sparta Prague (5)	Teplice	Slavia Prague	Horst Siegl (18)	Sparta Prague
1999–00	Sparta Prague (6)	Slavia Prague	Drnovice	Vratislav Lokvenc (22)	Sparta Prague
2000–01	Sparta Prague (7)	Slavia Prague	Sigma Olomouc	Vítězslav Tuma (15)	Drnovice
2001–02	Slovan Liberec (1)	Sparta Prague	Viktoria Žižkov	Jiří Štajner (15)	Slovan Liberec
2002–03	Sparta Prague (8)	Slavia Prague	Viktoria Žižkov	Jiří Kowalík (16)	1. FC Synot
2003–04	Baník Ostrava (1)	Sparta Prague	Sigma Olomouc	Marek Heinz (19)	Baník Ostrava
2004–05	Sparta Prague (9)	Slavia Prague	Teplice	Tomáš Jun (14)	Sparta Prague
2005–06	Slovan Liberec (2)	Mladá Boleslav	Slavia Prague	(Slovakia) Milan Ivana (11)	Slovácko
2006–07	Sparta Prague (10)	Slavia Prague	Mladá Boleslav	Luboš Pecka (16)	Mladá Boleslav
2007–08	Slavia Prague (2)	Sparta Prague	Baník Ostrava	Václav Svěrkoš (15)	Baník Ostrava
2008–09	Slavia Prague (3)	Sparta Prague	Slovan Liberec	(Croatia) Andrej Kerić (15)	Slovan Liberec
2009–10	Sparta Prague (11)	Jablonec	Baník Ostrava	Michal Ordoš (12)	Sigma Olomouc
2010–11	Viktoria Plzeň (1)	Sparta Prague	Jablonec	David Lafata (19)	Jablonec
2011–12	Slovan Liberec (3)	Sparta Prague	Viktoria Plzeň	David Lafata (25)	Jablonec
2012–13	Viktoria Plzeň (2)	Sparta Prague	Slovan Liberec	David Lafata (20)	Jablonec, Sparta Prague
2013–14	Sparta Prague (12)	Viktoria Plzeň	Mladá Boleslav	Josef Hušbauer (18)	Sparta Prague
2014–15	Viktoria Plzeň (3)	Sparta Prague	Jablonec	David Lafata (20)	Sparta Prague
2015–16	Viktoria Plzeň (4)	Sparta Prague	Slovan Liberec	David Lafata (20)	Sparta Prague
2016–17	Slavia Prague (4)	Viktoria Plzeň	Sparta Prague	Milan Škoda / David Lafata (15)	Slavia Prague / Sparta Prague
2017–18	Viktoria Plzeň (5)	Slavia Prague	Jablonec	Michael Krmenčík (16)	Viktoria Plzeň
2018–19	Slavia Prague (5)	Viktoria Plzeň	Sparta Prague	(Russia) Nikolay Komlichenko (29)	Mladá Boleslav
2019–20	Slavia Prague (6)	Viktoria Plzeň	Sparta Prague	Libor Kozák / (Croatia) Petar Musa (14)	Sparta Prague / Slavia Prague
2020–21	Slavia Prague (7)	Sparta Prague	Jablonec	Jan Kuchta / Adam Hložek (15)	Slavia Prague / Sparta Prague
2021–22	Viktoria Plzeň (6)	Slavia Prague	Sparta Prague	(France) Jean-David Beauguel (19)	Viktoria Plzeň
2022–23	Sparta Prague (13)	Slavia Prague	Viktoria Plzeň	Václav Jurečka (20)	Slavia Prague
2023–24	Sparta Prague (14)	Slavia Prague	Viktoria Plzeň	Václav Jurečka (19)	Slavia Prague
2024–25	Slavia Prague (8)	Viktoria Plzeň	Baník Ostrava	Jan Kliment (18)	Sigma Olomouc
2025–26	Slavia Prague (9)	Sparta Prague	Viktoria Plzeň		

== Performance by club ==
=== Czechoslovak First League (1925–1992) ===
Club	Winners	Winning years
Sparta Prague	21	1926, 1927, 1932, 1936, 1938, 1939, 1944, 1946, 1948, 1952, 1954, 1965, 1967, 1984, 1985, 1987, 1988, 1989, 1990, 1991, 1993
Slavia Prague	13	1925, 1929, 1930, 1931, 1933, 1934, 1935, 1937, 1940, 1941, 1942, 1943, 1947
Dukla Prague / ÚDA Prague	11	1953, 1956, 1958, 1961, 1962, 1963, 1964, 1966, 1977, 1979, 1982
Slovan Bratislava / NV Bratislava	8	1949, 1950, 1951, 1955, 1970, 1974, 1975, 1992
Spartak Trnava	5	1968, 1969, 1971, 1972, 1973
Baník Ostrava	3	1976, 1980, 1981
Vítkovice	1	1986
Viktoria Žižkov	1	1928
Bohemians Prague	1	1983
Zbrojovka Brno	1	1978
Spartak Hradec Králové	1	1960
Inter Bratislava	1	1959

=== Czech First League (1993–present) ===
Club	Winners	Runners-up	Winning seasons
Sparta Prague	14	9	1993–94, 1994–95, 1996–97, 1997–98, 1998–99, 1999–2000, 2000–01, 2002–03, 2004–05, 2006–07, 2009–10, 2013–14, 2022–23, 2023–24
Slavia Prague	9	12	1995–96, 2007–08, 2008–09, 2016–17, 2018–19, 2019–20, 2020–21, 2024–25, 2025–26
Viktoria Plzeň	6	5	2010–11, 2012–13, 2014–15, 2015–16, 2017–18, 2021–22
Slovan Liberec	3	0	2001–02, 2005–06, 2011–12
Baník Ostrava	1	0	2003–04
Sigma Olomouc	0	1	
Teplice	0	1	
Mladá Boleslav	0	1	
Jablonec	0	1	

Percentage of titles won by club since 1993
1. Sparta Prague - 14 (42.4%)
2. Slavia Prague - 9 (27.3%)
3. Viktoria Plzeň - 6 (18.2%)
4. Slovan Liberec - 3 (9.09%)
5. Baník Ostrava - 1 (3.03%)

=== Overall (1925–present) ===
(Slovakia) Slovak clubs are no longer eligible for the championship as they play in their own league.

Club	Winners	Winning years
Sparta Prague	35	1926, 1927, 1932, 1936, 1938, 1939, 1944, 1946, 1948, 1952, 1954, 1965, 1967, 1984, 1985, 1987, 1988, 1989, 1990, 1991, 1993, 1993–94, 1994–95, 1996–97, 1997–98, 1998–99, 1999–2000, 2000–01, 2002–03, 2004–05, 2006–07, 2009–10, 2013–14, 2022–23, 2023–24
Slavia Prague	22	1925, 1929, 1930, 1931, 1933, 1934, 1935, 1937, 1940, 1941, 1942, 1943, 1947, 1995–96, 2007–08, 2008–09, 2016–17, 2018–19, 2019–20, 2020–21, 2024–25, 2025–26
Dukla Prague / ÚDA Prague	11	1953, 1956, 1958, 1961, 1962, 1963, 1964, 1966, 1977, 1979, 1982
(Slovakia) Slovan Bratislava / NV Bratislava	8	1949, 1950, 1951, 1955, 1970, 1974, 1975, 1992
Viktoria Plzeň	6	2010–11, 2012–13, 2014–15, 2015–16, 2017–18, 2021–22
(Slovakia) Spartak Trnava	5	1968, 1969, 1971, 1972, 1973
Baník Ostrava	4	1976, 1980, 1981, 2003–04
Slovan Liberec	3	2001–02, 2005–06, 2011–12
Vítkovice	1	1986
Viktoria Žižkov	1	1928
Bohemians Prague	1	1983
Zbrojovka Brno	1	1978
Spartak Hradec Králové	1	1960
(Slovakia) Inter Bratislava	1	1959

== See also ==
- Football in Czechoslovakia
- Football in the Czech Republic
- Czechoslovak First League
- Czech First League
