= Oldřich Rulc =

Czech footballer (1911–1969)

Personal information
- Date of birth: 28 March 1911
- Place of birth: Strašnice, Bohemia, Austria-Hungary
- Date of death: 4 April 1969 (aged 58)
- Place of death: Brno, Czechoslovakia
- Position: Left forward

Youth career
- Viktoria Strašnice

Senior career*
Years	Team	Apps	(Gls)
1929–1930	AC Sparta Prague	4	(2)
1930–1948	SK Židenice	249	(65)

International career
1933–1938	Czechoslovakia	17	(2)
- * Club domestic league appearances and goals

Oldřich Rulc (28 March 1911 – 4 April 1969) was a Czech footballer who played as a forward. He played for the Czechoslovakia national football team.

== Career ==
Rulc played club football for Sparta Prague and SK Židenice (currently FC Zbrojovka Brno). He also made 17 appearances and scored two goals for the Czechoslovakia national football team, including an appearance at the 1938 FIFA World Cup finals.

== First League statistics ==
Season	Games	Goals	Club
1929–30	4	2	AC Sparta Prague
1933–34	18	8	SK Židenice
1934–35	22	3	SK Židenice
1935–36	25	5	SK Židenice
1936–37	22	3	SK Židenice
1937–38	22	10	SK Židenice
1938–39	13	3	SK Židenice
1939–40	22	7	SK Židenice
1940–41	22	7	SK Židenice
1941–42	21	8	SK Židenice
1942–43	8	1	SK Židenice
1943–44	5	0	SK Židenice
1945–46	18	2	SK Židenice
1946–47	24	7	SK Židenice
1948	7	1	Zbrojovka Židenice
Total 1st League	253	67	
