= František Svoboda =

Czech footballer

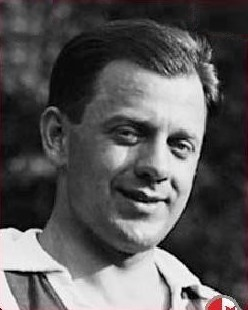

Personal information
- Date of birth: 5 August 1906
- Place of birth: Vienna, Austria-Hungary
- Date of death: 6 July 1948 (aged 41)
- Place of death: Czechoslovakia
- Position: Striker

Senior career*
Years	Team	Apps	(Gls)
–1926	Rapid Vinohrady		
1926–1940	Slavia Prague		(101)
1940–1941	Viktoria Žižkov		

International career
1926–1937	Czechoslovakia	43	(22)
Medal record
Representing Czechoslovakia
Men's Football
FIFA World Cup
Runner-up	1934 Italy
- * Club domestic league appearances and goals

František Svoboda (5 August 1906 – 6 July 1948) was a Czech football player who played as a striker. His nickname was "Franci" (the French).

== Club career ==
He started his career with Vinohrady Rapid, from where he moved to Slavia Prague in 1926, and with them he was the Champions of Czechoslovakia 8 times, played a pivotal role in helping the club to win 8 national league titles, scoring 101 league goals in his 14 years at the club and being the top goalscorer of the 1934–35 season with 27 goals. He remained in Slavia until 1940, after which he succeeded Viktoria Žižkov.

Svoboda had been rather famous as a striker, and his long-range goals were well known.

== International career ==
He played 43 matches in 10 years for the Czechoslovakia national team, scoring 22 goals, and he was a member of the team that reached the final of the 1934 FIFA World Cup, playing in three matches and scoring a goal in the match against Switzerland. Half of his international tally came in the Central European Cup, and with those 11 goals, he is the fourth all-time top goal scorer in the competition's history.

== International goals ==
Czechoslovakia score listed first, score column indicates score after each Svoboda goal.

International goals by cap, date, venue, opponent, score, result and competition
No.	Cap	Date	Venue	Opponent	Score	Result	Competition
1	2	2 January 1927	Stade de Sclessin, Liège, Belgium	Belgium	1–0	3–2	Friendly
2	2	2 January 1927	Stade de Sclessin, Liège, Belgium	Belgium	3–1	3–2	Friendly
3	4	24 April 1927	Stadion Letná, Prague, Czechoslovakia	Hungary	3–0	4–1	Friendly
4	8	23 October 1927	Stadion Letná, Prague, Czechoslovakia	Italy	1–1	2–2	1927–30 Central European Cup
5	8	23 October 1927	Stadion Letná, Prague, Czechoslovakia	Italy	2–1	2–2	1927–30 Central European Cup
6	9	28 October 1927	Stadion Letná, Prague, Czechoslovakia	Yugoslavia	2–1	5–3	Friendly
7	9	28 October 1927	Stadion Letná, Prague, Czechoslovakia	Yugoslavia	5–3	5–3	Friendly
8	12	3 March 1929	Stadio Littoriale, Bologna, Italy	Italy	2–2	2–4	1927–30 Central European Cup
9	13	17 March 1929	Stadion Letná, Prague, Czechoslovakia	Austria	3–2	3–3	Friendly
10	15	8 September 1929	Stadion Letná, Prague, Czechoslovakia	Hungary	1–0	1–1	1927–30 Central European Cup
11	17	6 October 1929	Stadion Letná, Prague, Czechoslovakia	Switzerland	3–0	5–0	1927–30 Central European Cup
12	20	23 March 1930	Stadion Letná, Prague, Czechoslovakia	Austria	1–1	2–2	Friendly
13	23	13 June 1930	Stadion Letná, Prague, Czechoslovakia	Spain	2–0	2–0	Friendly
14	27	22 March 1931	Stadion Letná, Prague, Czechoslovakia	Hungary	1–2	3–3	1931–32 Central European Cup
15	27	22 March 1931	Stadion Letná, Prague, Czechoslovakia	Hungary	3–3	3–3	1931–32 Central European Cup
16	30	15 November 1931	Stadio Nazionale PNF, Rome, Italy	Italy	1–1	2–2	1931–32 Central European Cup
17	30	15 November 1931	Stadio Nazionale PNF, Rome, Italy	Italy	2–2	2–2	1931–32 Central European Cup
18	32	22 May 1932	Stadion Letná, Prague, Czechoslovakia	Austria	1–1	1–1	1931–32 Central European Cup
19	35	10 June 1933	Stadion Letná, Prague, Czechoslovakia	France	3–0	4–0	Friendly
20	36	25 March 1934	Stade Yves-du-Manoir, Colombes, France	France	1–1	2–1	Friendly
21	37	31 May 1934	Stadio Benito Mussolini, Turin, Italy	Switzerland	1–1	3–2	1934 World Cup quarter-final
22	42	21 February 1937	Stadion Letná, Prague, Czechoslovakia	Switzerland	3–1	5–2	1936–38 Central European Cup

== Honours ==
=== Club ===
Slavia Prague

Czechoslovak First League:

- Champions (8): 1928–29, 1929–30, 1930–31, 1932–33, 1933–34, 1934–35, 1936–37 and 1939–40

=== International ===
Czechoslovakia

World Cup:

- Runners-up (1): 1934

Central European Cup:

- Runners-up (1): 1927–30

=== Individual ===
- Top goalscorer of the 1934–35 Czechoslovak First League with 27 goals
