= John Dick (footballer, born 1876) =

Scottish footballer and manager

Personal information
- Date of birth: 29 January 1876
- Place of birth: Eaglesham, Renfrewshire, Scotland
- Date of death: 14 September 1932 (aged 55)
- Place of death: Welling, Kent, England
- Position: Centre half

Senior career*
Years	Team	Apps	(Gls)
1897–1898	Airdrieonians	16	(3)
1898–1912	Woolwich Arsenal	266	(12)
1906	→ Crystal Palace (loan)	1	(0)

Managerial career
- 1919–1923: Sparta Prague
- 1923–1929: K. Beerschot V.A.C.
- 1928–1933: Sparta Prague
- * Club domestic league appearances and goals

John Dick (29 January 1876 – 14 September 1932) was a Scottish football player and manager.

Born in Eaglesham, Renfrewshire, Dick first played for Airdrieonians, but in 1898 he was signed by London side Woolwich Arsenal as one of manager William Elcoat's many Scottish signings, with reserve striker James Devlin going the other way. A strong muscular centre half (in those days the centre half played in midfield), Dick immediately made his debut for Arsenal on the first day of the season (against Luton Town on 3 September 1898), and he only missed four games of his first season.

Dick was noted for his formidable stamina (he was a cross-country runner as well and once recorded a time of six-and-a-half miles in 33 minutes, 45 seconds), and was a near ever-present in the Woolwich Arsenal side for the next six seasons; he missed only one game in 1899–1900, and although not a prolific goalscorer (he only scored thirteen times in his entire Arsenal career), he did score twice in a 12-0 demolition of Loughborough on 12 March 1900, Arsenal's record win in a competitive match.

With the arrival of Percy Sands in 1903, Dick moved to right half, and continued to be an ever-present as Arsenal won promotion from the Second Division to the First Division in 1903–04. In the meantime he had also become club captain, though by the time promotion had come round, fellow Scot Jimmy Jackson had taken over as skipper. Dick played as first-choice right half for Arsenal's first season in the top flight (and broke the 200 match barrier, one of the first Arsenal players to do so), but at the start of the 1905–06 season he lost his place to James Bigden, and stepped down to the reserves. During this season he played one game for Crystal Palace, on the 17 April 1906 in the Southern Football League Division Two. He continued to play sporadically for the first team for the next five years, but never regained a regular place. In all, he played 262 games for Arsenal in the League and FA Cup, and 30 in other first-class matches.

In the summer of 1912 he left Arsenal to coach abroad in Prague, and became known for being one of the early pioneers of football in Czechoslovakia, where he successfully coached DFC Prag and Sparta Prague (at that time another Scot, Jake Madden, was in charge of Sparta's city rivals Slavia).

He later returned to Britain for cancer treatment and died aged 55 in London.

== Honours ==
=== Player ===
Airdrieonians

- Lanarkshire Cup: 1897–98

Arsenal

- Second Division promotion: 1903–04

=== Manager ===
Sparta Prague

- Mitropa Cup runners-up: 1930
- Czechoslovak First League: 1931–32
  - runners-up 1929–30, 1930–31
- Bohemian Union Championship: 1919, 1922 (Note: Commission for History and Statistics of the FAČR later recognized and awarded four league titles from the "Association League" era. Three went to Sparta (1912, 1919 and 1922) and one to Slavia (1913))
- Středočeská župa: 1920, 1921, 1923 (Note: Domestic league competition not recognized by Czech FA.)

K. Beerschot V.A.C.

- Belgian First Division: 1923–24, 1924–25, 1925–26, 1927–28
  - runners-up 1926–27, 1928–29
