= 1932–33 Czechoslovak First League =

Czechoslovak First League
- Season: 1932–33
- Champions: Slavia Prague
- Relegated: SK Libeň; SK Plzeň
- Top goalscorer: Gejza Kocsis (23 goals)

Statistics of Czechoslovak First League in the 1932–33 season. Gejza Kocsis was the league's top scorer with 23 goals.

== Overview ==
It was contested by 10 teams, and Slavia Prague won the championship.

== League standings ==
Pos	Team	Pld	W	D	L	GF	GA	GR	Pts
1	Slavia Prague (C)	18	12	2	4	60	21	2.857	26
2	Sparta Prague	18	10	4	4	53	31	1.710	24
3	Viktoria Plzeň	18	9	4	5	37	32	1.156	22
4	Viktoria Žižkov	18	10	1	7	41	33	1.242	21
5	SK Kladno	18	9	0	9	41	34	1.206	18
6	Bohemians Prague	18	8	2	8	47	45	1.044	18
7	SK Náchod	18	8	2	8	41	48	0.854	18
8	Teplitzer FK	18	7	3	8	39	38	1.026	17
9	SK Libeň (R)	18	3	2	13	31	68	0.456	8
10	SK Plzeň (R)	18	2	4	12	18	58	0.310	8

Source: rsssf.com
(C) Champions; (R) Relegated

== Results ==
Home \ Away	BOH	KLA	LIB	NÁC	SKP	SLA	SPA	TEP	PLZ	VŽI
Bohemians Prague		1–4	8–1	5–1	3–2	1–3	1–2	5–3	1–4	1–3
SK Kladno	2–1		8–0	3–4	3–0	2–3	3–2	4–1	2–0	0–1
SK Libeň	4–5	6–1		2–4	1–2	0–4	3–8	2–2	1–0	1–3
SK Náchod	3–0	4–2	4–2		1–1	1–3	2–1	3–3	0–1	2–4
SK Plzeň	1–3	0–3	2–2	1–4		2–1	1–1	0–4	1–1	1–4
Slavia Prague	1–2	4–0	6–0	6–1	9–1		3–1	3–1	8–2	1–2
Sparta Prague	2–2	2–1	3–2	5–1	8–0	2–1		2–0	2–2	5–2
Teplitzer FK	3–1	2–1	3–1	1–3	5–1	1–1	2–4		3–1	3–2
Viktoria Plzeň	3–3	0–1	4–1	3–2	4–2	1–1	3–1	2–1		3–1
Viktoria Žižkov	3–4	3–1	1–2	5–1	1–0	1–2	2–2	2–1	1–3	

Source: statistiky1ligy.fotbal.cz
Legend: Blue = home team win; Yellow = draw; Red = away team win.
