= 1938–39 Czechoslovak First League =

Czechoslovak First League
- Season: 1938–39
- Dates: 21 August 1938 – 11 June 1939
- Champions: Czech: Sparta Prague; Slovakia: ŠK Bratislava
- Relegated: Czech: SK Libeň; Slovakia: none
- Top goalscorer: Czech: Josef Bican (29 goals)

The 1938–39 Czechoslovak First League, officially the Statni Liga, was the 15th season of the Czechoslovak First League, the first tier of league football in Czechoslovakia.

The championship was won by Sparta Prague, the club's sixth Czechoslovak national championship. Josef Bican was the league's top scorer with 29 goals.

During the season Czechoslovakia experienced considerable political change which resulted in the eventual disestablishment of the country, and thereby the Czechoslovak First League, by the hands of Nazi Germany. In September 1938, through the Munich Agreement, Nazi Germany acquired the Sudetenland from Czechoslovakia. This was followed by the German occupation of Czechoslovakia in March 1939. As a consequence the Gauliga Sudetenland was established for ethnic German clubs while Czech and Slovak clubs competed in their own, separate competitions.

The sole Slovak club in the league, ŠK Bratislava, was removed from the league and joined a new Slovak league, the Slovenská liga, in the newly independent Slovak Republic. Czech clubs in what was now the German-annexed Protectorate of Bohemia and Moravia continued their own league which was variously referred to as the Bohemia/Moravia championship, Národní liga (English: National league) or Česko-moravská liga (English: Bohemian-Moravian league).

== Bohemia and Moravia ==
The Czechoslovak First League continued its season after annexation by Germany, now with Czech clubs only. For the 1938–39 season Baťa Zlín and SK Libeň had been newly promoted to the league.

=== Table ===
| Pos | Team | Pld | W | D | L | GF | GA | GR | Pts |
|---|---|---|---|---|---|---|---|---|---|
| 1 | Sparta Prague (C) | 20 | 15 | 2 | 3 | 85 | 30 | 2.833 | 32 |
| 2 | Slavia Prague | 20 | 15 | 1 | 4 | 86 | 30 | 2.867 | 31 |
| 3 | SK Pardubice | 20 | 13 | 2 | 5 | 50 | 34 | 1.471 | 28 |
| 4 | SK Plzeň | 20 | 9 | 4 | 7 | 53 | 53 | 1.000 | 22 |
| 5 | Baťa Zlín | 20 | 9 | 3 | 8 | 50 | 52 | 0.962 | 21 |
| 6 | SK Židenice | 20 | 6 | 6 | 8 | 33 | 41 | 0.805 | 18 |
| 7 | Slezská Ostrava | 20 | 7 | 4 | 9 | 29 | 39 | 0.744 | 18 |
| 8 | Viktoria Žižkov | 20 | 7 | 3 | 10 | 56 | 60 | 0.933 | 17 |
| 9 | SK Kladno | 20 | 5 | 3 | 12 | 35 | 75 | 0.467 | 13 |
| 10 | SK Náchod | 20 | 5 | 2 | 13 | 37 | 56 | 0.661 | 12 |
| 11 | SK Libeň (R) | 20 | 3 | 2 | 15 | 31 | 75 | 0.413 | 8 |

(C) Champions; (R) Relegated

=== Results ===
| Home \ Away | ZLÍ | KLA | LIB | NÁC | PAR | PLZ | ŽID | SLA | OST | SPA | VŽI |
|---|---|---|---|---|---|---|---|---|---|---|---|
| Baťa Zlín | | 3–4 | 4–3 | 0–2 | 6–2 | 2–0 | 2–1 | 2–0 | 3–1 | 2–5 | 5–3 |
| SK Kladno | 2–2 | | 3–2 | 2–1 | 0–1 | 5–2 | 2–2 | 0–10 | 1–1 | 2–5 | 3–1 |
| SK Libeň | 1–3 | 3–2 | | 0–3 | 1–4 | 1–3 | 1–2 | 2–9 | 0–1 | 0–3 | 5–3 |
| SK Náchod | 5–1 | 6–1 | 5–2 | | 0–1 | 2–4 | 1–3 | 1–3 | 2–2 | 0–4 | 2–3 |
| SK Pardubice | 5–1 | 4–1 | 2–0 | 5–1 | | 5–1 | 2–2 | 1–0 | 2–1 | 2–3 | 3–1 |
| SK Plzeň | 3–3 | 10–1 | 2–1 | 5–1 | 2–2 | | 2–1 | 1–0 | 4–1 | 1–4 | 4–6 |
| SK Židenice | 4–1 | 4–0 | 2–2 | 1–1 | 1–0 | 1–2 | | 0–0 | 3–2 | 2–7 | 0–6 |
| Slavia Prague | 4–1 | 6–3 | 10–1 | 5–2 | 3–0 | 10–1 | 4–1 | | 4–2 | 0–5 | 6–4 |
| Slezská Ostrava | 1–1 | 5–1 | 1–1 | 2–1 | 1–3 | 2–1 | 1–0 | 1–3 | | 1–0 | 2–1 |
| Sparta Prague | 4–3 | 4–1 | 11–2 | 8–1 | 8–3 | 2–2 | 3–1 | 0–1 | 5–0 | | 4–4 |
| Viktoria Žižkov | 2–5 | 3–1 | 2–3 | 4–0 | 1–3 | 3–3 | 2–2 | 2–8 | 3–1 | 2–0 | |

Legend: Blue = home team win; Yellow = draw; Red = away team win.

== Slovakia ==
The Slovenská liga was a new competition, formed after the disestablishment of Czechoslovakia.

=== Table ===
| Pos | Team | Pld | W | D | L | GF | GA | GR | Pts |
|---|---|---|---|---|---|---|---|---|---|
| 1 | Sparta Považská Bystrica (C) | 8 | 7 | 1 | 0 | 34 | 6 | 5.667 | 15 |
| 2 | ŠK Bratislava | 8 | 7 | 1 | 0 | 30 | 11 | 2.727 | 15 |
| 3 | MŠK Žilina | 8 | 6 | 0 | 2 | 36 | 20 | 1.800 | 12 |
| 4 | Rapid Trnava | 8 | 4 | 0 | 4 | 29 | 18 | 1.611 | 8 |
| 5 | Juventus Topoľčany | 8 | 4 | 0 | 4 | 21 | 18 | 1.167 | 8 |
| 6 | TTS Trenčín | 8 | 2 | 1 | 5 | 19 | 31 | 0.613 | 5 |
| 7 | Spišská Nová Ves | 8 | 2 | 0 | 6 | 19 | 41 | 0.463 | 4 |
| 8 | Slávia Prešov | 8 | 1 | 1 | 6 | 12 | 28 | 0.429 | 3 |
| 9 | ZTK Zvolen | 8 | 1 | 0 | 7 | 14 | 41 | 0.341 | 2 |

(C) Champions
