= 1950 Czechoslovak First League =

Czechoslovak First League
- Season: 1950
- Dates: 5 March – 3 December
- Champions: NV Bratislava
- Relegated: Kovosmalt Trnava; ČSD Plzeň
- Top goalscorer: Josef Bican (22 goals)

Statistics of Czechoslovak First League in the 1950 season.

== Overview ==
It was contested by 14 teams, and NV Bratislava won the championship. Josef Bican was the league's top scorer with 22 goals.

== Stadia and locations ==
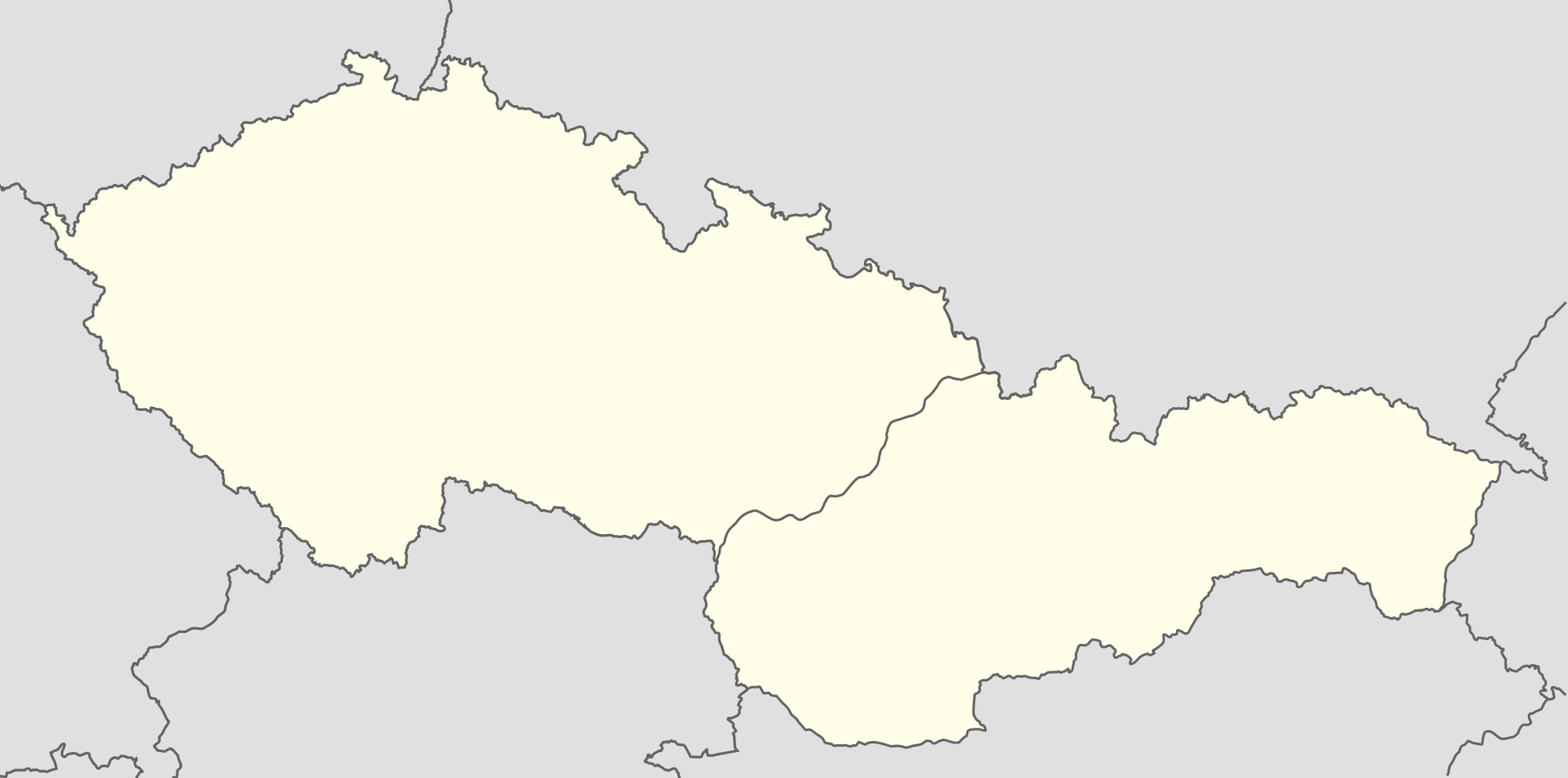
Location of clubs in the 1950 Czechoslovak First League

== League standings ==
Pos	Team	Pld	W	D	L	GF	GA	GR	Pts
1	NV Bratislava (C)	26	16	3	7	62	35	1.771	35
2	Bratrství Sparta	26	13	9	4	64	37	1.730	35
3	Železničáři Prague	26	14	7	5	52	36	1.444	35
4	Vítkovické železárny	26	13	5	8	53	47	1.128	31
5	ATK Prague	26	12	4	10	60	54	1.111	28
6	OD Karlín	26	11	5	10	45	49	0.918	27
7	Dynamo Slavia Prague	26	10	5	11	58	47	1.234	25
8	Technomat Teplice	26	8	9	9	51	50	1.020	25
9	Dukla Prešov	26	9	7	10	41	42	0.976	25
10	Škoda Plzeň	26	10	5	11	57	60	0.950	25
11	Dynamo ČSD Košice	26	8	8	10	39	39	1.000	24
12	Slovena Žilina	26	7	6	13	49	65	0.754	20
13	Kovosmalt Trnava (R)	26	6	7	13	36	45	0.800	19
14	ČSD Plzeň (R)	26	3	4	19	31	92	0.337	10

Source: rsssf.com
(C) Champions; (R) Relegated

== Results ==
Home \ Away	ATK	BRA	ČSD	KOŠ	DYN	TRN	NVB	KAR	PLZ	ŽIL	PRE	TEP	VÍT	ŽEL
ATK Prague		3–3	2–2	4–3	1–1	4–2	1–0	3–2	1–4	6–2	0–2	2–3	3–3	3–2
Bratrství Sparta	4–2		1–1	2–1	2–1	6–2	2–2	6–1	0–0	7–1	5–0	0–0	0–1	1–1
ČSD Plzeň	0–3	1–2		0–3	3–1	2–1	2–4	2–3	1–1	1–6	1–1	2–4	1–2	2–4
Dynamo ČSD Košice	2–3	1–1	3–0		2–1	0–1	0–0	0–0	7–0	2–0	1–0	2–2	2–2	1–0
Dynamo Slavia Prague	2–1	1–2	9–1	3–0		1–2	2–1	3–3	6–0	0–0	2–3	3–2	1–3	4–2
Kovosmalt Trnava	0–3	1–3	5–1	0–2	2–3		0–1	6–0	1–1	1–0	4–1	1–1	2–2	0–0
NV Bratislava	3–0	2–5	5–0	1–0	3–2	1–1		3–0	3–2	7–1	7–0	3–1	2–1	3–1
OD Karlín	3–1	1–0	1–2	5–1	1–1	3–1	5–0		3–0	2–2	1–0	2–1	3–2	0–1
Škoda Plzeň	3–1	4–0	9–0	3–2	4–2	2–0	2–4	3–0		2–5	5–0	1–1	3–4	2–1
Slovena Žilina	1–2	3–4	5–2	2–2	1–3	1–1	2–1	2–1	3–0		2–2	4–2	0–1	0–1
Sparta Dukla Prešov	1–0	0–0	6–0	1–1	3–1	1–0	1–2	2–3	4–0	4–2		0–1	6–0	2–2
Technomat Teplice	0–7	1–1	5–1	2–0	2–3	1–1	0–4	1–1	5–3	7–1	0–0		5–2	1–2
Vítkovické železárny	1–3	1–3	2–1	5–0	3–2	3–1	3–0	2–0	3–0	1–1	1–1	3–2		2–3
Železničáři Prague	5–1	5–4	4–2	1–1	0–0	2–0	1–0	4–1	3–3	3–2	1–0	1–1	2–0	

Source: statistiky1ligy.fotbal.cz
Legend: Blue = home team win; Yellow = draw; Red = away team win.
