= 1945–46 Czechoslovak First League =

Czechoslovak First League
- Season: 1945–46
- Dates: 16 September 1945 – 17 July 1946
- Champions: Sparta Prague
- Relegated: SK Rakovník; Čechie Karlín; Polaban Nymburk; SK Baťovany; Sparta Považská Bystrica; TSS Trnava; SK Prostějov; SK Pardubice
- Top goalscorer: Josef Bican (31 goals)

Statistics of Czechoslovak First League in the 1945–46 season.

== Overview ==
It was contested by 20 teams, and Sparta Prague won the championship. Josef Bican was the league's top scorer with 31 goals.

== Stadia and locations ==
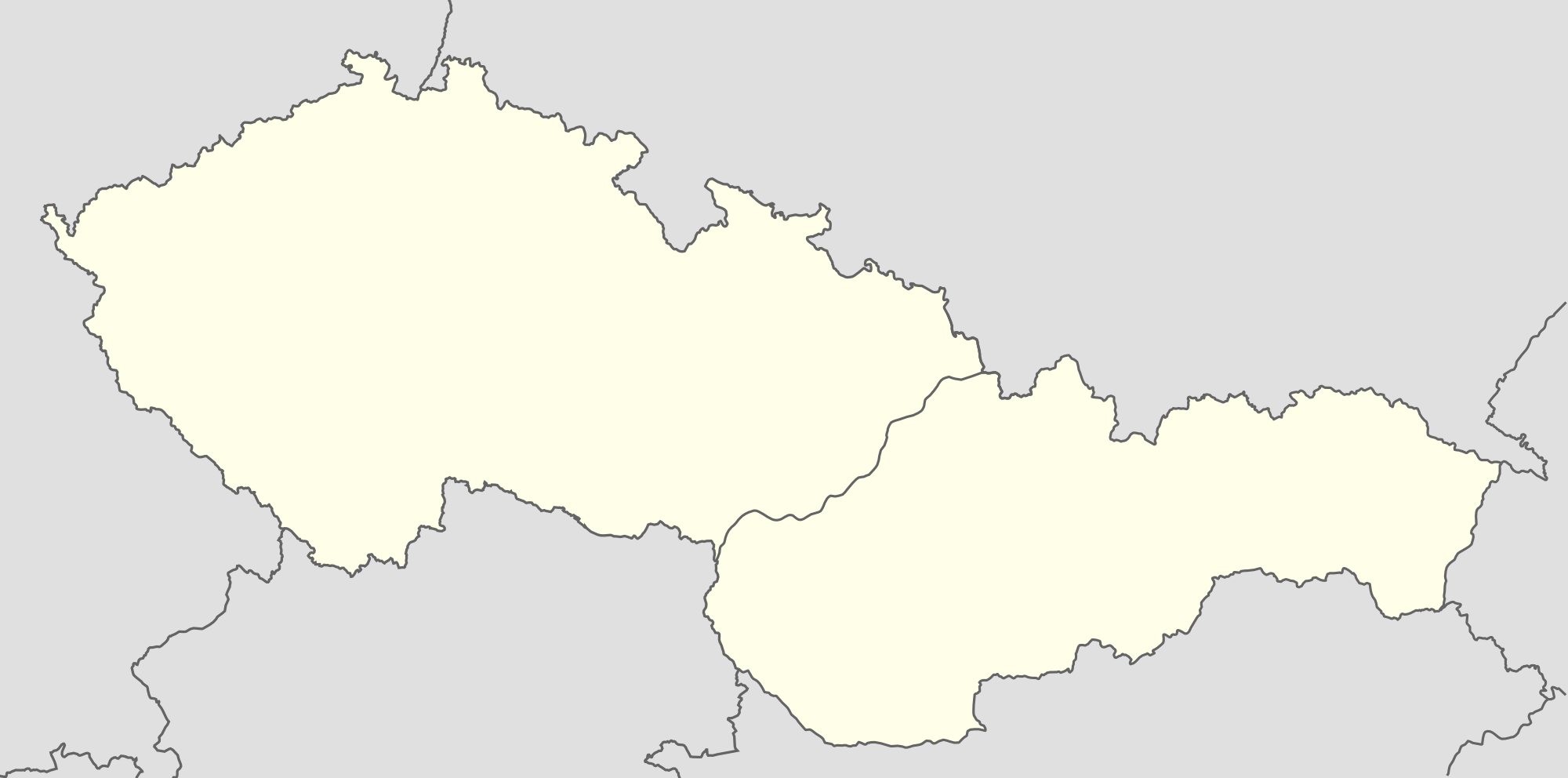
Location of clubs in the 1945–46 Czechoslovak First League

== Group A ==
=== Table ===
Pos	Team	Pld	W	D	L	GF	GA	GR	Pts
1	Sparta Prague (Q)	18	16	0	2	80	34	2.353	32
2	Baťa Zlín	18	11	1	6	66	44	1.500	23
3	SK Bratislava	18	9	3	6	54	41	1.317	21
4	Slezská Ostrava	18	9	1	8	55	57	0.965	19
5	Bohemians Prague	18	8	2	8	58	38	1.526	18
6	MŠK Žilina	18	8	2	8	43	46	0.935	18
7	SK Rakovník (R)	18	7	0	11	40	54	0.741	14
8	Čechie Karlín (R)	18	6	2	10	37	59	0.627	14
9	Polaban Nymburk (R)	18	5	2	11	57	69	0.826	12
10	SK Baťovany (R)	18	4	1	13	21	69	0.304	9

Source: rsssf.com
(Q) Qualified for the phase indicated; (R) Relegated

=== Results ===
Home \ Away	ZLÍ	BOH	KAR	ŽIL	NYM	BAT	SKB	RAK	OST	SPA
Baťa Zlín		5–4	5–1	2–0	9–3	6–1	3–1	5–2	5–1	3–1
Bohemians Prague	5–3		9–2	8–0	9–2	4–1	3–2	0–2	3–1	2–3
Čechie Karlín	3–3	2–0		1–2	3–3	3–1	0–3	1–4	0–7	5–3
MŠK Žilina	2–0	3–3	3–4		6–1	5–1	1–2	5–1	3–1	1–7
Polaban Nymburk	3–5	3–2	2–1	3–4		9–0	3–3	3–5	8–3	2–3
SK Baťovany	2–0	0–4	2–3	1–0	0–3		1–1	3–0	3–0	0–5
ŠK Bratislava	3–2	1–1	3–0	2–4	4–3	4–1		4–1	8–3	1–2
SK Rakovník	2–4	2–1	2–3	2–0	5–2	4–2	2–5		0–3	4–5
Slezská Ostrava	6–3	3–0	3–2	3–3	3–2	7–2	5–4	4–0		1–3
Sparta Prague	4–3	3–0	4–3	4–1	4–2	11–0	6–3	4–2	8–1	

Source: statistiky1ligy.fotbal.cz
Legend: Blue = home team win; Yellow = draw; Red = away team win.

== Group B ==
=== Table ===
Pos	Team	Pld	W	D	L	GF	GA	GR	Pts
1	Slavia Prague (Q)	18	13	3	2	99	24	4.125	29
2	SK Židenice	18	12	1	5	61	43	1.419	25
3	Viktoria Plzeň	18	11	2	5	62	55	1.127	24
4	Jednota Košice	18	9	4	5	55	38	1.447	22
5	SK Kladno	18	7	3	8	58	43	1.349	17
6	Viktoria Žižkov	18	7	3	8	45	53	0.849	17
7	Sparta Považská Bystrica (R)	18	5	4	9	44	63	0.698	14
8	TSS Trnava (R)	18	4	4	10	36	62	0.581	12
9	SK Prostějov (R)	18	4	3	11	25	64	0.391	11
10	SK Pardubice (R)	18	3	3	12	35	75	0.467	9

Source: rsssf.com
(Q) Qualified for the phase indicated; (R) Relegated

=== Results ===
Home \ Away	KOŠ	KLA	PAR	PRO	ŽID	SLA	POV	TRN	PLZ	VŽI
Jednota Košice		0–2	2–0	8–0	4–0	0–0	8–2	4–3	5–3	2–0
SK Kladno	4–2		4–1	2–3	0–1	4–3	2–2	12–2	4–5	5–0
SK Pardubice	2–2	0–8		4–3	2–4	0–10	1–2	5–6	2–3	4–3
SK Prostějov	2–1	1–1	2–3		1–2	1–8	4–2	2–2	3–2	0–1
SK Židenice	8–1	4–3	9–2	4–0		4–3	4–1	4–3	3–3	7–3
Slavia Prague	4–1	2–2	6–2	10–0	6–1		7–1	5–0	8–1	5–5
Sparta Považská Bystrica	4–4	3–2	5–2	1–1	5–2	1–5		2–2	3–6	1–2
TSS Trnava	1–3	4–2	1–1	2–0	1–2	0–9	1–3		1–1	4–1
Viktoria Plzeň	1–6	4–0	3–2	5–2	3–2	1–3	6–3	4–2		8–5
Viktoria Žižkov	2–2	6–1	2–2	6–0	2–0	0–5	4–3	2–1	1–3	

Source: statistiky1ligy.fotbal.cz
Legend: Blue = home team win; Yellow = draw; Red = away team win.

== Championship playoff ==
- Sparta Prague 4–2 Slavia Prague
- Slavia Prague 0–5 Sparta Prague

== Top goalscorers ==
Rank	Player	Club	Goals
1	(Czechoslovakia) Josef Bican	Slavia Prague	31
2	(Czechoslovakia) Vladimír Hönig	Viktoria Plzeň (16) / Baťa Zlín (14)	30
3	(Czechoslovakia) Jan Šimek	ŠK Židenice	26
4	(Czechoslovakia) Jan Seidl	SK Kladno	20
5	(Czechoslovakia) Josef Pajkrt	Polaban Nymburk	19
