= 1937–38 Czechoslovak First League =

Czechoslovak First League
- Season: 1937–38
- Dates: 22 August 1937 – 15 May 1938
- Champions: Sparta Prague
- Relegated: 1. ČsŠK Bratislava; SK Prostějov; SK Viktoria Plzeň
- Top goalscorer: Josef Bican (26 goals)

Statistics of Czechoslovak First League in the 1937–38 season.

== Overview ==
It was contested by 12 teams, and Sparta Prague won the championship. Josef Bican was the league's top scorer with 22 goals.

== League standings ==
Pos	Team	Pld	W	D	L	GF	GA	GR	Pts
1	Sparta Prague (C)	22	17	2	3	66	34	1.941	36
2	Slavia Prague	22	14	1	7	72	33	2.182	29
3	SK Židenice	22	11	4	7	46	27	1.704	26
4	SK Kladno	22	11	2	9	38	37	1.027	24
5	1. ČsŠK Bratislava (Note: 1. ČsŠK Bratislava were moved to the Slovak league in March 1939 after the annexation of Czechoslovakia by Germany.)	22	10	1	11	46	53	0.868	21
6	SK Náchod	22	9	3	10	37	53	0.698	21
7	SK Plzeň	22	8	4	10	47	51	0.922	20
8	Viktoria Žižkov	22	9	2	11	36	42	0.857	20
9	SK Pardubice	22	6	7	9	34	39	0.872	19
10	Slezská Ostrava	22	8	2	12	43	52	0.827	18
11	SK Prostějov (R)	22	5	6	11	39	65	0.600	16
12	Viktoria Plzeň (R)	22	4	6	12	33	51	0.647	14

Source: rsssf.com
(C) Champions; (R) Relegated

== Results ==
Home \ Away	BRA	KLA	NÁC	PAR	SKP	PRO	ŽID	SLA	OST	SPA	PLZ	VŽI
1. ČsŠK Bratislava		4–1	3–2	3–0	3–1	4–1	0–2	3–2	3–2	1–1	3–2	1–3
SK Kladno	1–0		5–1	1–0	3–1	2–2	4–0	1–0	3–1	0–2	2–1	4–0
SK Náchod	3–1	1–0		0–0	0–0	1–1	3–1	5–2	3–1	3–5	4–2	1–0
SK Pardubice	3–1	4–1	2–1		3–3	2–2	1–4	3–4	3–0	2–3	2–1	1–1
SK Plzeň	4–2	3–1	1–2	3–0		7–4	2–1	1–4	4–2	1–4	1–2	5–1
SK Prostějov	1–5	2–0	0–1	5–1	4–4		1–5	1–3	3–2	1–3	1–0	3–0
SK Židenice	1–3	2–0	5–1	0–0	2–0	5–0		2–0	4–1	2–2	2–2	1–0
Slavia Prague	8–0	6–0	4–1	1–1	5–0	9–0	2–1		4–1	1–2	7–0	1–0
Slezská Ostrava	4–1	0–3	7–0	1–0	2–2	2–2	1–4	1–3		3–2	4–3	3–1
Sparta Prague	3–1	4–2	6–1	3–2	1–0	4–2	2–1	5–1	2–3		5–0	2–7
Viktoria Plzeň	4–1	2–2	3–1	1–1	2–3	2–2	1–1	2–4	0–1	0–2		3–2
Viktoria Žižkov	4–3	1–2	4–2	0–3	3–1	3–1	1–0	3–1	2–1	0–3	0–0	

Source: statistiky1ligy.fotbal.cz
Legend: Blue = home team win; Yellow = draw; Red = away team win.
