= 1966–67 Czechoslovak First League =

Czechoslovak First League
- Season: 1966–67
- Champions: Sparta Prague
- Relegated: Spartak ZJŠ Brno; Spartak Hradec Králové
- European Cup: Sparta Prague
- Cup Winners' Cup: Spartak Trnava
- Fairs Cup: Slavia Prague
- Top goalscorer: Jozef Adamec (21 goals)

Statistics of Czechoslovak First League in the 1966–67 season.

== Overview ==
It was contested by 14 teams, and Sparta Prague won the championship. Jozef Adamec was the league's top scorer with 21 goals.

== Stadia and locations ==
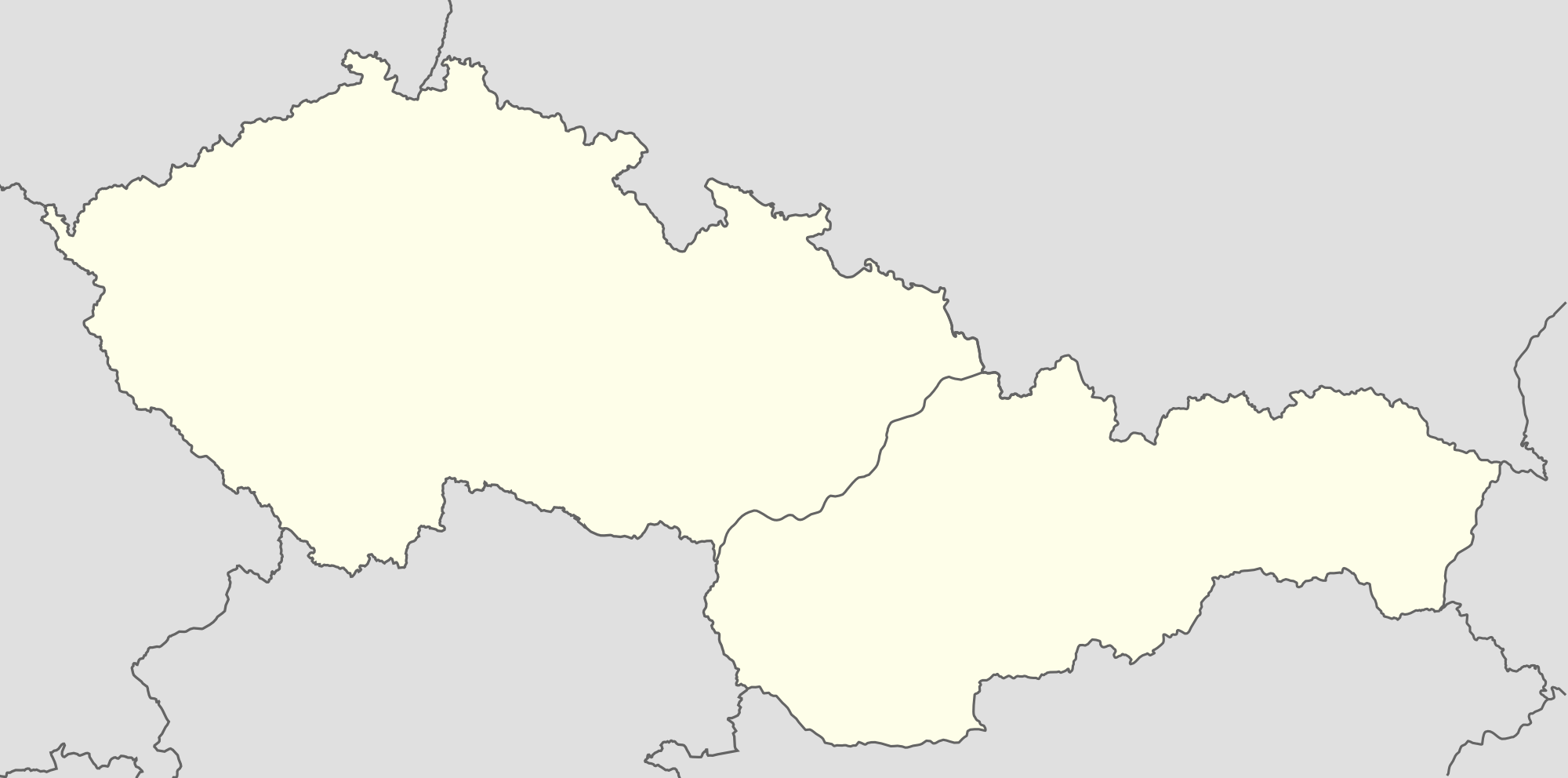
Location of clubs in the 1966–67 Czechoslovak First League

== League standings ==
Pos	Team	Pld	W	D	L	GF	GA	GR	Pts	Qualification or relegation
1	Sparta Prague (C)	26	18	3	5	53	21	2.524	39	Qualification for European Cup first round
2	Slovan Bratislava	26	14	7	5	33	17	1.941	35	
3	Spartak Trnava	26	16	2	8	53	26	2.038	34	Qualification for Cup Winners' Cup first round
4	Dukla Prague	26	15	3	8	52	27	1.926	33	
5	Slavia Prague	26	12	6	8	39	37	1.054	30	Invitation for Inter-Cities Fairs Cup first round
6	Jednota Trenčín	26	11	7	8	40	29	1.379	29	
7	Jednota Žilina	26	9	8	9	43	41	1.049	26	
8	VSS Košice	26	9	6	11	27	26	1.038	24	
9	Sklo Union Teplice	26	9	4	13	23	36	0.639	22	
10	FK Inter Bratislava	26	9	3	14	36	36	1.000	21	
11	Bohemians Prague	26	8	4	14	24	52	0.462	20	
12	Lokomotíva Košice	26	6	6	14	16	46	0.348	18	
13	Spartak ZJŠ Brno (R)	26	7	3	16	24	49	0.490	17	Relegation to Czechoslovak Second League
14	Spartak Hradec Králové (R)	26	5	6	15	28	48	0.583	16	Relegation to Czechoslovak Second League

Source: rsssf.com
(C) Champions; (R) Relegated

== Results ==
Home \ Away	BOH	DUK	INT	TRE	LOK	TEP	SLA	SLO	SPA	HRK	TRN	BRN	KOŠ	ŽIL
Bohemians Prague		1–2	1–0	0–0	1–1	0–0	1–0	1–4	0–3	2–1	1–3	0–2	3–1	2–0
Dukla Prague	1–2		3–1	2–1	5–0	3–0	1–2	2–0	0–2	6–1	2–1	3–0	1–0	0–4
Inter Bratislava	6–0	1–3		2–0	2–0	2–0	2–2	0–0	2–1	2–2	2–0	5–1	1–0	2–1
Jednota Trenčín	3–0	1–2	3–2		3–0	1–0	2–3	0–0	1–0	3–1	3–2	0–0	1–1	6–0
Lokomotíva Košice	1–1	0–0	1–0	1–1		1–0	0–2	0–1	0–3	1–0	1–1	3–1	1–0	1–0
Sklo Union Teplice	2–1	1–1	2–1	1–2	1–0		3–0	0–0	0–1	1–0	2–0	4–0	1–0	2–4
Slavia Prague	5–1	1–2	2–1	1–0	2–0	0–0		1–0	1–1	1–3	1–3	3–1	2–0	1–1
Slovan Bratislava	2–0	1–0	1–0	2–1	1–1	3–0	2–1		4–1	2–0	2–1	1–0	2–0	4–3
Sparta Prague	3–0	3–1	2–0	5–0	2–0	6–1	2–3	2–0		3–1	2–1	2–0	2–1	2–1
Spartak Hradec Králové	3–4	1–4	2–0	0–3	4–1	0–1	1–1	0–0	1–2		1–0	2–4	2–1	0–0
Spartak Trnava	3–0	1–0	2–0	1–0	7–1	3–0	5–1	1–0	1–0	3–0		4–1	3–0	1–1
Spartak ZJŠ Brno	0–1	2–1	3–1	0–2	1–0	3–0	0–1	0–0	0–1	1–1	1–3		1–0	1–2
VSS Košice	3–0	0–0	2–0	2–2	4–1	1–0	4–1	0–0	1–1	1–0	2–0	2–1		1–0
ZVL Žilina	3–1	0–7	2–1	1–1	3–0	3–1	1–1	2–1	1–1	1–1	2–3	7–0	0–0	

Source: statistiky1ligy.fotbal.cz
Legend: Blue = home team win; Yellow = draw; Red = away team win.
