= 1928–29 Czechoslovak First League =

Czechoslovak First League
- Season: 1928–29
- Champions: Slavia Prague
- Relegated: SK Libeň
- Top goalscorer: Antonín Puč (13 goals)

Statistics of Czechoslovak First League in the 1928–29 season. Antonín Puč was the league's top scorer with 13 goals.

== Overview ==
It was contested by 7 teams, and Slavia Prague won the championship.

== League standings ==
Pos	Team	Pld	W	D	L	GF	GA	GR	Pts
1	Slavia Prague (C)	12	10	1	1	47	15	3.133	21
2	Viktoria Žižkov	12	8	2	2	37	17	2.176	18
3	Sparta Prague	12	5	3	4	32	21	1.524	13
4	Bohemians Prague	12	6	0	6	33	31	1.065	12
5	SK Kladno	12	4	2	6	20	30	0.667	10
6	Čechie Karlín	12	2	3	7	11	29	0.379	7
7	SK Libeň (R)	12	1	1	10	13	50	0.260	3

Source: rsssf.com
(C) Champions; (R) Relegated

== Results ==
Home \ Away	BOH	KAR	KLA	LIB	SLA	SPA	VŽI
Bohemians Prague		4–0	4–1	3–2	0–4	4–1	4–2
Čechie Karlín	0–4		2–1	2–2	0–1	0–0	1–3
SK Kladno	3–2	2–1		3–0	0–3	1–1	1–1
SK Libeň	4–3	0–3	1–3		1–9	0–2	1–5
Slavia Prague	5–2	7–0	5–1	6–1		2–1	0–5
Sparta Prague	4–2	1–1	6–4	7–0	3–4		2–3
Viktoria Žižkov	5–1	4–1	4–0	4–1	1–1	0–4	

Source: statistiky1ligy.fotbal.cz
Legend: Blue = home team win; Yellow = draw; Red = away team win.
