= 1975–76 Czechoslovak First League =

Czechoslovak First League
- Season: 1975–76
- Champions: Baník Ostrava
- Relegated: LIAZ Jablonec; TŽ Třinec
- European Cup: Baník Ostrava
- Cup Winners' Cup: Sparta Prague
- UEFA Cup: Slovan Bratislava; Slavia Prague
- Top goalscorer: Dušan Galis (21 goals)

Statistics of Czechoslovak First League in the 1975–76 season.

== Overview ==
It was contested by 16 teams, and FC Baník Ostrava won the championship. Dušan Galis was the league's top scorer with 21 goals.

== Stadia and locations ==
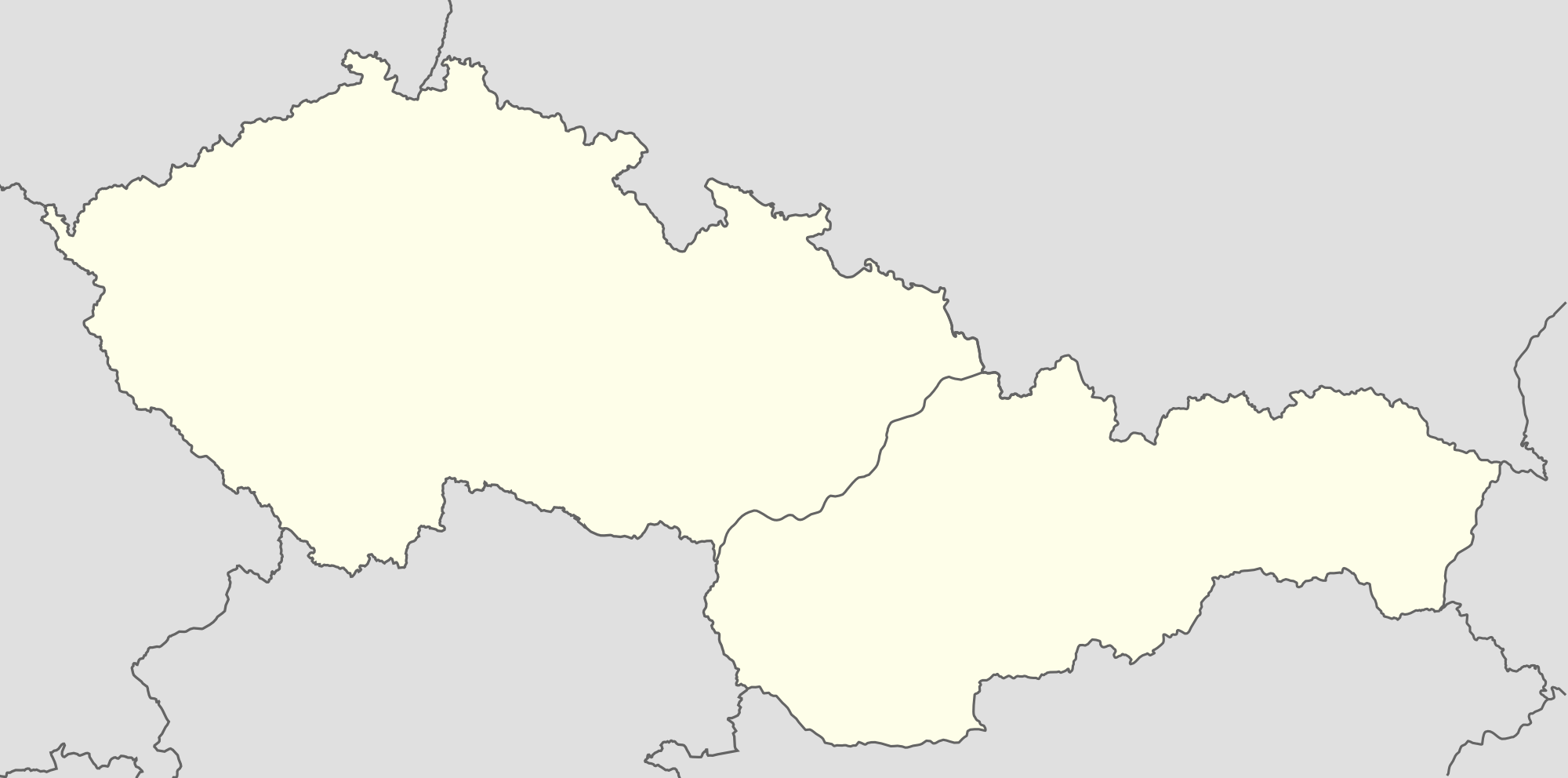
Location of clubs in the 1975–76 Czechoslovak First League

== League standings ==
Pos	Team	Pld	W	D	L	GF	GA	GD	Pts	Qualification or relegation
1	Baník Ostrava (C)	30	14	9	7	37	29	+8	37	Qualification for European Cup first round
2	Slovan Bratislava	30	15	6	9	49	25	+24	36	Qualification for UEFA Cup first round
3	Slavia Prague	30	16	4	10	50	33	+17	36	Qualification for UEFA Cup first round
4	Dukla Prague	30	15	5	10	52	36	+16	35	
5	Sklo Union Teplice	30	12	8	10	36	44	−8	32	
6	Inter Bratislava	30	12	7	11	34	27	+7	31	
7	Zbrojovka Brno	30	11	9	10	35	28	+7	31	
8	Lokomotíva Košice	30	12	6	12	55	50	+5	30	
9	Bohemians Prague	30	10	10	10	35	31	+4	30	
10	Spartak Trnava	30	12	5	13	35	32	+3	29	
11	VSS Košice	30	11	6	13	45	42	+3	28	
12	ZVL Žilina	30	12	4	14	38	42	−4	28	
13	Škoda Plzeň	30	10	7	13	34	48	−14	27	
14	Jednota Trenčín	30	9	8	13	23	53	−30	26	
15	LIAZ Jablonec (R)	30	7	10	13	28	51	−23	24	Relegation to Czechoslovak Second League
16	TŽ Třinec (R)	30	8	4	18	22	37	−15	20	Relegation to Czechoslovak Second League

Source: rsssf.com
(C) Champions; (R) Relegated

Sparta Prague qualified for the Cup Winners' Cup as Czechoslovak Cup winners from a lower division.

== Results ==
Home \ Away	OST	BOH	DUK	INT	TRE	JAB	LOK	TEP	PLZ	SLA	SLO	TRN	TŘI	KOŠ	BRN	ŽIL
Baník Ostrava		2–1	3–0	2–0	3–0	1–1	3–2	3–1	0–0	2–0	2–1	0–2	1–0	2–0	0–0	1–0
Bohemians Prague	2–1		2–1	0–0	3–3	1–0	5–0	0–0	2–1	1–0	1–1	2–0	2–0	1–2	3–0	1–0
Dukla Prague	3–1	1–1		1–0	4–0	2–2	4–2	6–0	2–2	2–3	1–0	1–1	2–0	3–2	1–1	1–0
Inter Bratislava	0–0	1–0	1–0		1–1	0–0	0–0	6–1	1–1	3–1	2–0	1–2	2–0	4–2	1–0	3–0
Jednota Trenčín	0–0	1–0	0–1	1–0		1–0	0–0	1–0	4–2	1–0	0–1	2–1	0–0	1–0	0–2	1–0
LIAZ Jablonec	1–1	3–1	1–0	0–1	1–1		1–2	1–1	2–1	2–0	2–2	2–0	1–0	1–1	3–0	0–0
Lokomotiva Košice	3–1	1–1	2–3	3–0	2–1	10–1		1–2	3–0	4–1	2–0	5–2	0–0	0–2	3–1	5–0
Sklo Union Teplice	0–0	0–0	3–2	0–1	2–2	3–0	0–0		6–1	3–2	1–0	2–0	1–0	2–0	1–0	1–0
Škoda Plzeň	0–1	3–2	1–0	2–0	1–0	1–0	3–0	2–0		3–1	0–0	1–1	3–1	2–1	0–0	1–1
Slavia Prague	1–0	1–1	2–0	2–0	3–1	7–1	4–1	1–1	2–1		1–0	5–0	2–0	1–0	1–0	6–2
Slovan Bratislava	1–3	2–1	2–1	1–1	6–0	6–0	2–1	4–1	5–0	2–0		2–1	1–0	4–0	1–0	2–1
Spartak Trnava	0–0	2–0	2–1	2–0	3–0	2–0	5–0	0–1	2–0	0–1	0–2		2–1	3–0	0–0	2–0
TŽ Třinec	1–2	0–0	1–2	1–0	1–1	2–0	1–2	3–0	3–0	0–1	1–0	1–0		1–0	1–3	2–0
VSS Košice	6–1	0–0	0–2	0–3	3–0	1–0	1–1	4–1	4–2	1–1	0–0	0–0	4–1		4–0	3–1
Zbrojovka Brno	1–1	1–0	0–1	2–1	8–0	2–1	3–0	1–1	2–0	0–0	1–1	1–0	2–0	1–2		2–0
ZVL Žilina	2–0	4–1	1–4	2–1	5–0	1–1	3–0	3–1	2–0	1–0	1–0	1–0	3–0	3–2	1–1	

Source: statistiky1ligy.fotbal.cz
Legend: Blue = home team win; Yellow = draw; Red = away team win.

== Attendances ==
#	Club	Average	Highest
1	Slavia Praha	9,871	28,500
2	Slovan	9,801	19,204
3	Brno	8,603	13,193
4	Baník Ostrava	8,490	17,424
5	Spartak Trnava	6,963	13,622
6	Bohemians	6,709	11,520
7	Trenčín	6,490	16,820
8	Jablonec	6,244	15,486
9	VSS	5,973	16,226
10	Teplice	5,868	11,612
11	Plzeň	5,149	15,033
12	Lokomotíva Košice	4,909	13,017
13	Inter Bratislava	4,632	17,422
14	Žilina	3,322	9,278
15	Třinec	2,952	5,771
16	Dukla Praha	2,907	6,612
