= 1940–41 Národní liga =

Národní liga
- Season: 1940–41
- Champions: Slavia Prague
- Relegated: FK Viktoria Žižkov; SK Libeň
- Top goalscorer: Josef Bican (38 goals)

The 1940–41 Národní liga (English: National league) was the second season of the Národní liga, the first tier of league football in the Nazi Germany-annexed Protectorate of Bohemia and Moravia which had been part of Czechoslovakia until March 1939.

The Czech championship was won by Slavia Prague, and Josef Bican was the league's top scorer with 38 goals.

Czech clubs in what was now the German-annexed Protectorate of Bohemia and Moravia continued their own league which was variously referred to as the Národní liga (English: National league), Bohemia/Moravia championship or Česko-moravská liga (English: Bohemian-Moravian league) while ethnic-German clubs played in the German Gauliga Sudetenland.

In the Slovak Republic an independent Slovak league, the Slovenská liga, had been established in 1939 and played out its own championship which was won by ŠK Bratislava in the 1940–41 season. A national Czechoslovak championship was not played between 1939 and 1945.

== Table ==
For the 1940–41 season Bohemians Prague and SK Libeň had been newly promoted to the league.

| Pos | Team | Pld | W | D | L | GF | GA | GR | Pts |
|---|---|---|---|---|---|---|---|---|---|
| 1 | Slavia Prague (C) | 22 | 14 | 4 | 4 | 93 | 42 | 2.214 | 32 |
| 2 | SK Plzeň | 22 | 12 | 2 | 8 | 63 | 57 | 1.105 | 26 |
| 3 | SK Pardubice | 22 | 10 | 4 | 8 | 44 | 32 | 1.375 | 24 |
| 4 | Sparta Prague | 22 | 11 | 2 | 9 | 53 | 40 | 1.325 | 24 |
| 5 | Bohemians Prague | 22 | 11 | 1 | 10 | 47 | 43 | 1.093 | 23 |
| 6 | SK Kladno | 22 | 9 | 4 | 9 | 52 | 49 | 1.061 | 22 |
| 7 | Baťa Zlín | 22 | 9 | 4 | 9 | 49 | 57 | 0.860 | 22 |
| 8 | SK Prostějov | 22 | 8 | 5 | 9 | 46 | 43 | 1.070 | 21 |
| 9 | Viktoria Plzeň | 22 | 9 | 3 | 10 | 52 | 61 | 0.852 | 21 |
| 10 | SK Židenice | 22 | 7 | 4 | 11 | 51 | 68 | 0.750 | 18 |
| 11 | Viktoria Žižkov (R) | 22 | 6 | 4 | 12 | 38 | 70 | 0.543 | 16 |
| 12 | SK Libeň (R) | 22 | 5 | 5 | 12 | 32 | 58 | 0.552 | 15 |

(C) Champions; (R) Relegated

== Results ==
| Home \ Away | ZLÍ | BOH | KLA | LIB | PAR | SKP | PRO | ŽID | SLA | SPA | PLZ | VŽI |
|---|---|---|---|---|---|---|---|---|---|---|---|---|
| Baťa Zlín | | 2–4 | 2–1 | 2–0 | 1–2 | 5–4 | 2–2 | 2–0 | 1–3 | 4–0 | 4–4 | 6–0 |
| Bohemians Prague | 1–2 | | 3–2 | 3–4 | 2–1 | 3–0 | 0–1 | 3–1 | 1–4 | 4–1 | 2–3 | 4–0 |
| SK Kladno | 3–2 | 1–2 | | 4–0 | 0–2 | 5–0 | 4–3 | 3–1 | 3–2 | 3–1 | 7–2 | 1–1 |
| SK Libeň | 1–3 | 2–0 | 2–2 | | 0–0 | 2–3 | 3–0 | 2–2 | 0–4 | 3–1 | 0–2 | 1–1 |
| SK Pardubice | 2–0 | 3–2 | 2–0 | 1–1 | | 1–1 | 3–0 | 0–2 | 2–3 | 4–3 | 5–0 | 6–1 |
| SK Plzeň | 5–1 | 1–3 | 3–4 | 6–1 | 3–1 | | 3–1 | 7–0 | 1–4 | 1–5 | 4–1 | 7–3 |
| SK Prostějov | 1–1 | 2–0 | 6–0 | 4–0 | 1–0 | 1–1 | | 3–3 | 6–1 | 1–0 | 1–3 | 3–5 |
| SK Židenice | 8–3 | 3–3 | 4–3 | 3–2 | 4–3 | 1–3 | 3–5 | | 4–4 | 1–4 | 0–4 | 1–4 |
| Slavia Prague | 12–1 | 6–0 | 4–1 | 2–4 | 4–2 | 11–1 | 2–2 | 5–4 | | 1–1 | 5–2 | 5–1 |
| Sparta Prague | 3–1 | 0–3 | 2–2 | 7–1 | 1–0 | 1–3 | 2–1 | 1–3 | 2–1 | | 7–0 | 4–1 |
| Viktoria Plzeň | 1–1 | 1–2 | 4–2 | 6–2 | 1–2 | 1–3 | 5–2 | 2–0 | 3–3 | 1–3 | | 4–3 |
| Viktoria Žižkov | 0–3 | 3–2 | 1–1 | 2–1 | 2–2 | 2–3 | 2–0 | 2–3 | 0–7 | 1–4 | 3–2 | |

Legend: Blue = home team win; Yellow = draw; Red = away team win.
