= 1927–28 Czechoslovak First League =

Czechoslovak First League
- Season: 1927–28
- Dates: 4 August 1927 – 3 July 1928
- Champions: SK Viktoria Žižkov
- Relegated: ČAFC Vinohrady
- Top goalscorer: Karel Meduna (12 goals)

Statistics of Czechoslovak First League in the 1927–28 season. Karel Meduna was the league's top scorer with 12 goals.

== Overview ==
It was contested by 7 teams, and FK Viktoria Žižkov won the championship.

== League standings ==
Pos	Team	Pld	W	D	L	GF	GA	GR	Pts
1	Viktoria Žižkov (C)	12	8	2	2	41	20	2.050	18
2	Slavia Prague	12	7	2	3	27	20	1.350	16
3	Sparta Prague	12	6	2	4	36	18	2.000	14
4	Bohemians Prague	12	4	2	6	17	26	0.654	10
5	SK Kladno	12	4	1	7	24	39	0.615	9
6	Čechie Karlín	12	4	1	7	23	38	0.605	9
7	ČAFC Vinohrady (R)	12	2	4	6	16	23	0.696	8

Source: rsssf.com
(C) Champions; (R) Relegated

== Results ==
Home \ Away	BOH	VIN	KAR	KLA	SLA	SPA	VŽI
Bohemians Prague		1–1	3–2	1–3	1–4	1–0	1–0
ČAFC Vinohrady	1–2		2–2	2–4	0–0	0–1	2–4
Čechie Karlín	3–2	2–3		3–0	3–2	3–2	0–3
SK Kladno	1–1	3–1	4–2		1–2	0–1	2–3
Slavia Prague	3–1	2–1	4–1	3–2		2–1	3–4
Sparta Prague	4–2	1–1	8–1	11–2	3–0		3–5
Viktoria Žižkov	4–1	1–2	5–1	9–2	2–2	1–1	

Source: statistiky1ligy.fotbal.cz
Legend: Blue = home team win; Yellow = draw; Red = away team win.
