= 1935–36 Czechoslovak First League =

Czechoslovak First League
- Season: 1935–36
- Champions: Sparta Prague
- Relegated: DFC Prag; Teplitzer FK; AFK Kolín; DSV Saaz Žatec
- Top goalscorer: Vojtěch Bradáč (42 goals)

Statistics of Czechoslovak First League in the 1935–36 season.

== Overview ==
It was contested by 14 teams, and Sparta Prague won the championship. Vojtěch Bradáč was the league's top scorer with 42 goals. 1. ČsŠK Bratislava became the first Slovak club to play in the league.

== League standings ==
Pos	Team	Pld	W	D	L	GF	GA	GR	Pts
1	Sparta Prague (C)	26	19	3	4	100	27	3.704	41
2	Slavia Prague	26	19	3	4	90	32	2.813	41
3	SK Prostějov	26	16	4	6	66	41	1.610	36
4	SK Židenice	26	13	6	7	65	42	1.548	32
5	SK Plzeň	26	13	4	9	80	61	1.311	30
6	SK Náchod	26	11	3	12	60	67	0.896	25
7	1. ČsŠK Bratislava	26	10	5	11	50	61	0.820	25
8	Viktoria Plzeň	26	9	6	11	52	54	0.963	24
9	SK Kladno	26	7	7	12	59	80	0.738	21
10	Moravská Slavia Brno	26	7	7	12	42	60	0.700	21
11	DFC Prag (R)	26	7	6	13	30	57	0.526	20
12	Teplitzer FK (R)	26	7	4	15	49	65	0.754	18
13	AFK Kolín (R)	26	4	8	14	44	82	0.537	16
14	DSV Saaz Žatec (R)	26	5	4	17	34	92	0.370	14

Source: rsssf.com
(C) Champions; (R) Relegated

== Results ==
Home \ Away	BRA	KOL	DFC	SAA	BRN	KLA	NÁC	SKP	PRO	ŽID	SPA	SLA	TEP	PLZ
1. ČsŠK Bratislava		2–2	3–1	5–2	1–1	7–2	3–0	4–0	3–2	1–1	1–0	0–2	3–2	1–0
AFK Kolín	2–3		2–2	2–1	0–0	3–3	5–1	2–6	1–7	1–1	2–3	2–2	3–1	2–5
DFC Prag	4–1	2–1		2–1	1–0	2–2	0–4	3–3	0–0	1–2	0–3	0–3	0–0	1–1
DSV Saaz Žatec	3–1	1–1	1–2		2–4	1–5	3–1	4–2	2–2	2–1	0–5	0–4	3–1	1–1
Moravská Slavia Brno	6–2	1–1	0–1	4–1		2–2	4–2	1–3	2–4	1–2	1–3	0–1	1–0	2–0
SK Kladno	2–1	1–2	4–1	2–2	1–1		6–2	2–4	0–5	3–3	1–2	1–3	5–3	1–0
SK Náchod	3–0	7–2	2–3	2–0	3–0	4–3		4–2	0–6	4–4	3–3	1–1	4–1	5–1
SK Plzeň	6–2	8–4	3–0	11–1	1–1	8–4	1–2		1–1	4–1	1–4	2–0	4–1	2–2
SK Prostějov	3–0	3–0	3–2	2–0	2–2	5–1	3–2	2–1		2–1	1–0	1–0	3–0	0–1
SK Židenice	1–1	5–1	3–0	7–1	6–2	6–2	2–0	0–3	4–1		2–2	1–2	2–0	2–0
Sparta Prague	7–1	2–0	5–0	6–0	9–0	6–0	0–1	8–0	4–0	3–2		2–1	5–1	10–1
Slavia Prague	3–0	8–2	5–1	9–1	3–2	3–0	5–1	5–1	9–2	3–0	4–2		4–3	7–2
Teplitzer FK	3–1	4–1	3–0	3–1	3–4	1–3	4–1	3–2	2–4	2–4	2–2	3–3		2–2
Viktoria Plzeň	3–3	3–0	2–1	7–0	6–0	3–3	5–1	0–1	3–2	0–2	2–4	2–0	0–1	

Source: statistiky1ligy.fotbal.cz
Legend: Blue = home team win; Yellow = draw; Red = away team win.
