= 1970–71 Czechoslovak First League =

Czechoslovak First League
- Season: 1970–71
- Champions: Spartak Trnava
- Relegated: Škoda Plzeň; TJ Gottwaldov
- European Cup: Spartak Trnava
- Cup Winners' Cup: Škoda Plzeň
- UEFA Cup: VSS Košice; Sklo Union Teplice
- Top goalscorer: Jozef Adamec; Zdeněk Nehoda (16 goals each)

Statistics of Czechoslovak First League in the 1970–71 season.

== Overview ==
It was contested by 16 teams, and FC Spartak Trnava won the championship. Jozef Adamec and Zdeněk Nehoda were the league's top scorers with 16 goals each.

== Stadia and locations ==
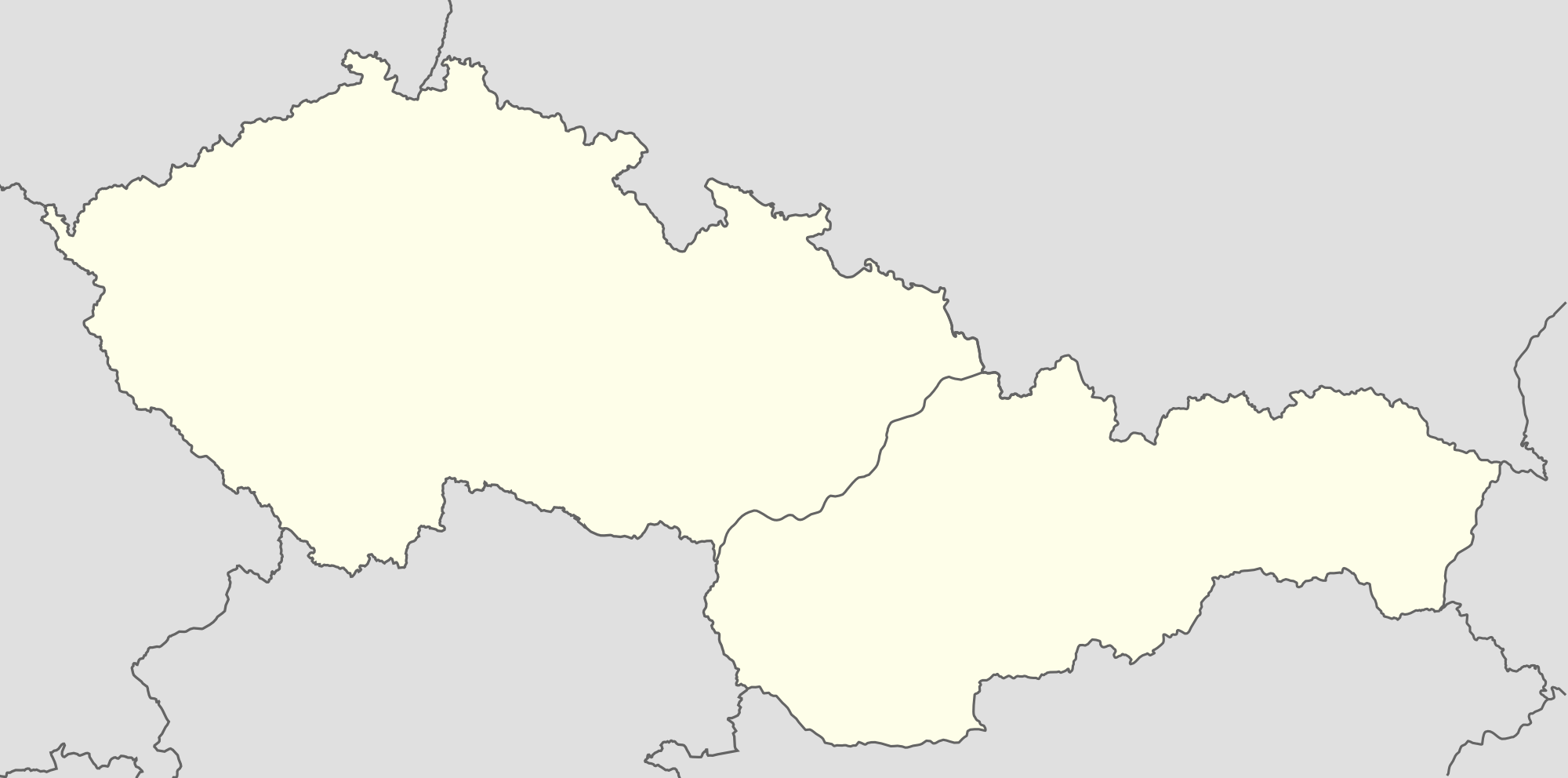
Location of clubs in the 1970–71 Czechoslovak First League

== League standings ==
Pos	Team	Pld	W	D	L	GF	GA	GD	Pts	Qualification or relegation
1	Spartak Trnava (C)	30	17	6	7	52	27	+25	40	Qualification for European Cup first round
2	VSS Košice	30	16	4	10	46	30	+16	36	Qualification for UEFA Cup first round
3	Sklo Union Teplice	30	14	7	9	38	26	+12	35	Qualification for UEFA Cup first round
4	Sparta Prague	30	14	7	9	38	32	+6	35	
5	Baník Ostrava	30	11	12	7	39	32	+7	34	
6	Slovan Bratislava	30	11	10	9	34	28	+6	32	
7	Inter Bratislava	30	11	8	11	35	34	+1	30	
8	Tatran Prešov	30	11	8	11	28	32	−4	30	
9	ZVL Žilina	30	9	11	10	39	40	−1	29	
10	TŽ Třinec	30	12	5	13	32	36	−4	29	
11	Jednota Trenčín	30	12	5	13	38	44	−6	29	
12	Slavia Prague	30	11	7	12	27	33	−6	29	
13	Dukla Prague	30	10	8	12	42	41	+1	28	
14	Lokomotíva Košice	30	9	8	13	27	30	−3	26	
15	Škoda Plzeň (R)	30	8	6	16	30	54	−24	22	Cup Winners' Cup and relegation to Second League (Note: Škoda Plzeň qualified for the Cup Winners' Cup as Czechoslovak Cup runners-up.)
16	TJ Gottwaldov (R)	30	5	6	19	30	56	−26	16	Relegation to Czechoslovak Second League

Source: rsssf.com
(C) Champions; (R) Relegated

== Results ==
Home \ Away	OST	DUK	INT	TRE	LOK	PLZ	TEP	SLA	SLO	SPA	TRN	PRE	GOT	TŘI	KOŠ	ŽIL
Baník Ostrava		1–1	3–0	1–1	2–1	0–0	4–2	1–1	2–0	0–2	2–2	0–0	4–2	1–0	2–1	3–0
Dukla Prague	2–2		2–0	5–1	4–1	4–0	0–1	0–0	0–1	0–2	0–0	1–1	2–1	6–2	0–1	2–1
Inter Bratislava	0–0	4–1		0–0	1–0	0–1	2–0	1–0	1–1	3–0	4–0	2–0	4–2	2–1	1–0	2–2
Jednota Trenčín	1–0	1–0	3–0		0–1	3–1	0–0	3–0	2–1	1–3	2–0	1–0	4–2	3–2	1–0	2–2
Lokomotíva Košice	2–0	4–0	0–1	2–0		3–0	2–0	0–0	0–1	1–1	1–0	0–0	2–0	1–0	1–1	0–0
Škoda Plzeň	0–1	1–3	1–1	2–1	2–0		1–1	0–2	2–2	1–3	0–0	3–0	2–1	1–0	1–3	2–1
Sklo Union Teplice	0–0	1–0	2–0	2–2	3–0	3–0		3–1	1–0	1–0	0–0	4–0	3–1	1–0	3–1	3–0
Slavia Prague	0–0	0–3	1–0	3–1	1–0	3–2	1–0		0–0	1–2	1–2	0–0	1–0	0–1	2–1	3–0
Slovan Bratislava	1–2	0–0	3–2	4–1	2–0	3–1	1–0	0–2		2–0	1–1	2–0	1–2	3–0	1–1	1–1
Sparta Prague	0–0	2–3	2–0	3–2	2–1	2–2	0–0	2–0	0–1		1–0	3–1	3–2	2–0	1–0	0–2
Spartak Trnava	4–2	4–0	3–0	2–0	3–0	5–1	2–1	1–1	1–0	3–0		3–0	3–0	3–2	2–0	4–0
Tatran Prešov	2–1	1–1	1–0	1–0	0–0	4–0	2–0	1–0	2–0	0–0	3–0		1–0	3–0	2–0	1–1
TJ Gottwaldov	1–1	3–1	1–1	1–0	1–1	0–1	1–3	2–3	1–1	0–0	0–1	1–0		0–1	1–1	2–0
TŽ Třinec	4–2	3–1	0–0	1–0	1–0	1–0	0–0	3–0	1–1	1–0	0–2	2–0	3–1		3–2	0–0
VSS Košice	0–1	2–0	2–1	5–0	2–1	2–1	2–0	1–0	2–0	1–1	2–0	3–2	5–0	1–0		1–0
ZVL Žilina	2–1	0–0	2–2	0–2	2–2	2–1	3–0	3–0	0–0	3–1	3–1	4–0	3–1	0–0	2–3	

Source: statistiky1ligy.fotbal.cz
Legend: Blue = home team win; Yellow = draw; Red = away team win.

== Attendances ==
#	Club	Average	Highest
1	Sparta Praha	14,822	35,883
2	Slavia Praha	10,470	17,877
3	Spartak Trnava	10,331	17,000
4	Baník Ostrava	9,549	21,660
5	Plzeň	8,573	22,502
6	Slovan	7,908	19,001
7	Třinec	6,608	13,180
8	Teplice	5,459	10,588
9	VSS	4,985	9,205
10	Žilina	4,608	10,920
11	Dukla Praha	4,394	11,088
12	Trenčín	4,318	11,407
13	Tatran Prešov	4,181	8,524
14	Inter Bratislava	3,827	10,327
15	Lokomotíva Košice	3,796	7,995
16	Gottwaldov	3,357	7,596
