= 1965–66 Czechoslovak First League =

Czechoslovak First League
- Season: 1965–66
- Champions: Dukla Prague
- Relegated: Baník Ostrava; Tatran Prešov
- European Cup: Dukla Prague
- Cup Winners' Cup: Tatran Prešov
- Fairs Cup: Spartak ZJŠ Brno
- Top goalscorer: Ladislav Michalík (15 goals)
- Highest attendance: 50,105; Sparta Prague vs Slavia Prague (4 September 1965)

Statistics of Czechoslovak First League in the 1965–66 season.

== Overview ==
It was contested by 14 teams, and Dukla Prague won the championship. Ladislav Michalík was the league's top scorer with 15 goals. The match between Sparta Prague and Slavia Prague had an attendance of 50,105 - setting a league record.

== Stadia and locations ==
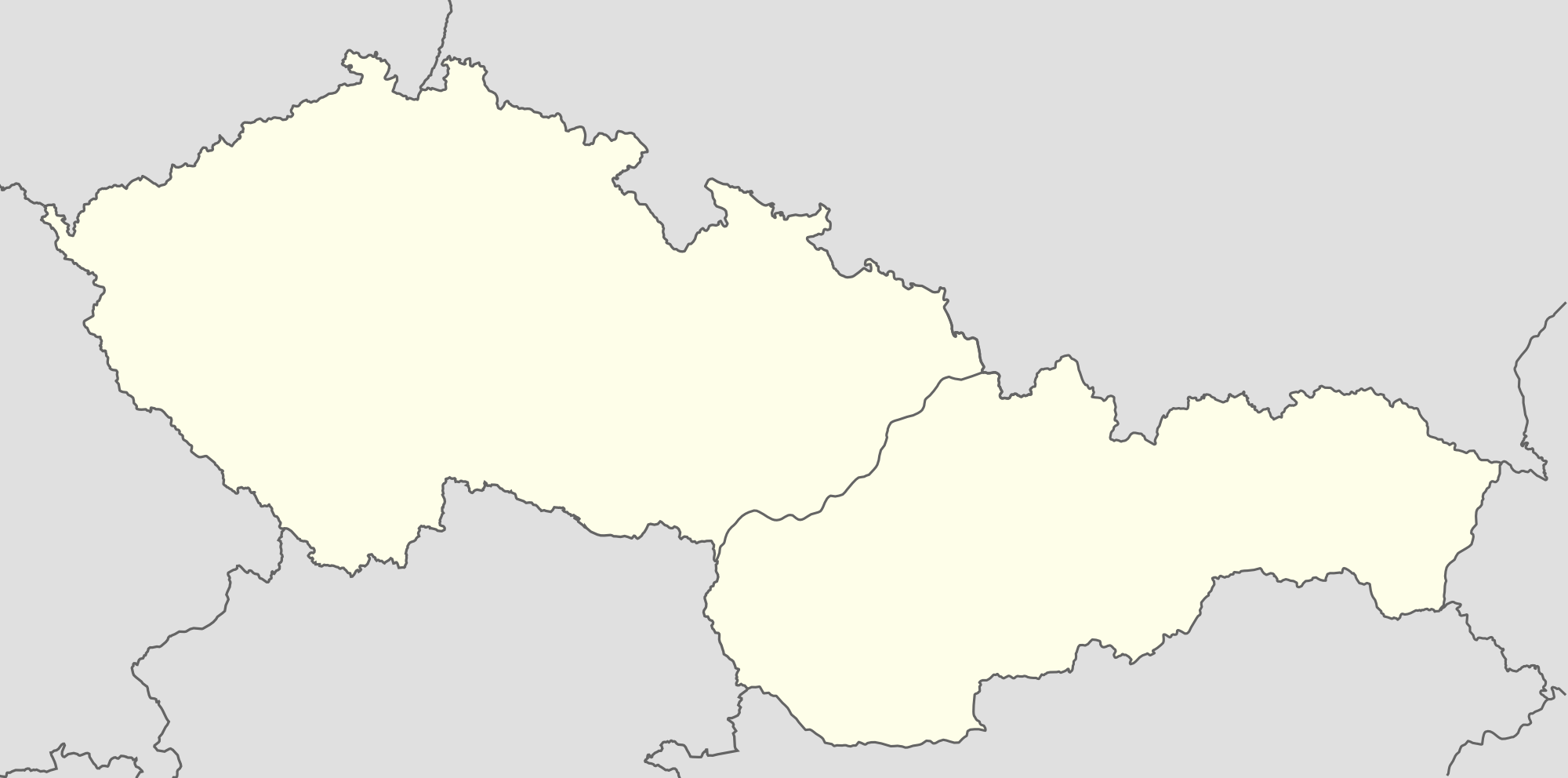
Location of clubs in the 1965–66 Czechoslovak First League

== League standings ==
Pos	Team	Pld	W	D	L	GF	GA	GR	Pts	Qualification or relegation
1	Dukla Prague (C)	26	13	7	6	40	23	1.739	33	Qualification for European Cup first round
2	Sparta Prague	26	13	7	6	47	30	1.567	33	Invitation for Inter-Cities Fairs Cup first round
3	Slavia Prague	26	12	9	5	35	24	1.458	33	
4	Inter Bratislava	26	10	10	6	36	30	1.200	30	
5	Jednota Trenčín	26	10	8	8	27	21	1.286	28	
6	Spartak Trnava	26	12	3	11	34	26	1.308	27	
7	Slovan Bratislava	26	9	7	10	34	29	1.172	25	
8	Spartak Hradec Králové	26	8	9	9	29	34	0.853	25	
9	VSS Košice	26	8	8	10	26	31	0.839	24	
10	Spartak ZJŠ Brno	26	5	12	9	21	31	0.677	22	Invitation for Inter-Cities Fairs Cup first round
11	Slovan Teplice	26	9	4	13	20	36	0.556	22	
12	Lokomotíva Košice	26	7	8	11	19	39	0.487	22	
13	Baník Ostrava (R)	26	8	5	13	36	38	0.947	21	Relegation to Czechoslovak Second League
14	Tatran Prešov (R)	26	5	9	12	24	36	0.667	19	Cup Winners' Cup and relegation to Second League (Note: Tatran Prešov qualified for the Cup Winners' Cup as Czechoslovak Cup runners-up.)

Source: rsssf.com
(C) Champions; (R) Relegated

== Results ==
Home \ Away	OST	DUK	INT	TRE	LOK	TEP	SLA	SLO	SPA	HRK	TRN	BRN	PRE	KOŠ
Baník Ostrava		0–2	5–1	0–2	2–1	0–0	5–0	2–1	0–1	1–1	1–3	2–1	3–0	4–0
Dukla Prague	1–0		3–3	1–1	0–1	3–0	2–0	1–1	3–4	1–0	1–0	0–0	5–0	5–1
Inter Bratislava	4–2	2–0		0–0	1–1	2–0	0–1	1–2	1–1	1–1	2–1	2–1	2–1	2–0
Jednota Trenčín	0–0	0–1	2–1		3–0	4–0	1–2	2–0	1–0	3–0	1–0	0–0	2–1	1–0
Lokomotíva Košice	2–1	0–2	1–1	1–0		2–1	0–0	0–4	3–1	0–3	1–0	1–1	1–0	0–0
Sklo Union Teplice	1–2	2–0	1–0	0–0	2–1		2–1	2–0	1–0	1–0	0–1	2–0	2–0	0–2
Slavia Prague	1–1	1–1	0–1	3–0	3–1	2–1		1–0	1–1	0–1	2–1	2–2	2–0	2–0
Slovan Bratislava	2–1	0–1	1–1	3–2	1–1	4–0	0–1		5–4	3–0	3–0	1–1	2–2	1–0
Sparta Prague	4–1	1–3	2–1	3–0	4–0	1–0	2–2	0–0		1–1	3–1	0–0	1–0	1–0
Spartak Hradec Králové	1–0	1–2	1–1	2–0	2–0	1–1	0–4	1–0	3–3		2–1	2–1	0–0	1–2
Spartak Trnava	1–1	3–1	1–2	2–1	5–1	2–0	0–0	2–0	2–0	1–0		2–0	2–1	3–0
Spartak ZJŠ Brno	2–1	1–1	0–2	0–0	0–0	1–1	0–2	1–0	0–4	3–1	2–0		2–1	0–0
Tatran Prešov	2–1	0–0	0–0	1–1	2–0	4–0	1–1	0–0	1–3	2–2	1–0	1–1		3–1
VSS Košice	4–0	1–0	2–2	0–0	0–0	3–0	1–1	2–0	0–2	2–2	0–0	3–1	2–0	

Source: statistiky1ligy.fotbal.cz
Legend: Blue = home team win; Yellow = draw; Red = away team win.

== Attendances ==
No.	Club	Average
1	Sparta Praha	24,231
2	Slavia Praha	23,692
3	Slovan Bratislava	14,538
4	Lokomotíva Košice	13,538
5	Spartak Trnava	12,538
6	Baník Ostrava	12,406
7	Zbrojovka Brno	12,308
8	Hradec Králové	10,769
9	Teplice	10,308
10	Dukla Praha	9,038
11	Košice	7,538
12	Inter Bratislava	6,000
13	Tatran Prešov	5,538
14	Trenčín	5,019
