= DSV Saaz =

- Full name: Deutscher Spielverein Saaz
- Dissolved: 1945

Deutscher Spielverein Saaz (DSV Saaz), also known as DSV Žatec, was a football club from the town of Žatec. The club was a member of the German Football Association in Czechoslovakia (German: Deutscher Fußballverband in der ČSR) but played one season in the Czechoslovak First League. The club's single top-flight season was the 1935–36 Czechoslovak First League, finishing last among 14 teams, conceding 92 goals in 26 matches. During their top-flight season, the club experienced an average home attendance of 1,900, with the highest attendance across the season set at 4,000. The club disbanded in 1945.
