= 1939–40 Národní liga =

Národní liga
- Season: 1939–40
- Champions: Slavia Prague
- Relegated: SK Náchod; SK Slezská Ostrava
- Top goalscorer: Josef Bican (50 goals)

The 1939–40 Národní liga (English: National league) was the first season of the Národní liga, the first tier of league football in the Nazi Germany-annexed Protectorate of Bohemia and Moravia which had been part of Czechoslovakia until March 1939.

The Czech championship was won by Slavia Prague, and Josef Bican was the league's top scorer with 50 goals.

Czech clubs in what was now the German-annexed Protectorate of Bohemia and Moravia continued their own league which was variously referred to as the Národní liga (English: National league), Bohemia/Moravia championship or Česko-moravská liga (English: Bohemian-Moravian league) while ethnic-German clubs played in the German Gauliga Sudetenland.

In the Slovak Republic an independent Slovak league, the Slovenská liga, had been established in 1939 and played out its own championship which was won by ŠK Bratislava in the 1939–40 season. A national Czechoslovak championship was not played between 1939 and 1945.

== Table ==
For the 1939–40 season Viktoria Plzeň and SK Prostějov had been newly promoted to the league.

Pos	Team	Pld	W	D	L	GF	GA	GR	Pts
1	Slavia Prague (C)	22	16	6	0	107	37	2.892	38
2	Sparta Prague	22	15	5	2	71	34	2.088	35
3	SK Pardubice	22	9	5	8	46	39	1.179	23
4	Baťa Zlín	22	10	3	9	52	63	0.825	23
5	SK Židenice	22	9	5	8	38	50	0.760	23
6	SK Plzeň	22	8	4	10	56	52	1.077	20
7	SK Prostějov	22	9	2	11	47	48	0.979	20
8	Viktoria Plzeň	22	6	6	10	61	68	0.897	18
9	Viktoria Žižkov	22	7	4	11	48	65	0.738	18
10	SK Kladno	22	7	4	11	44	66	0.667	18
11	SK Náchod (R)	22	8	1	13	54	72	0.750	17
12	Slezská Ostrava (R)	22	4	5	13	38	68	0.559	13

Source: rsssf.com
(C) Champions; (R) Relegated

== Results ==
Home \ Away	ZLÍ	KLA	NÁC	PAR	SKP	PRO	ŽID	SLA	OST	SPA	PLZ	VŽI
Baťa Zlín		2–1	7–3	3–0	2–1	4–2	1–3	2–2	3–1	1–6	6–3	3–2
SK Kladno	4–1		5–2	2–1	1–1	4–0	1–2	1–1	4–2	1–1	3–3	2–3
SK Náchod	4–1	4–0		2–2	3–4	1–2	1–2	3–7	3–1	1–3	4–2	3–2
SK Pardubice	2–1	5–0	3–1		2–1	2–1	4–0	1–3	4–0	0–0	4–0	2–4
SK Plzeň	3–3	2–4	0–2	1–1		4–2	9–1	1–8	5–2	1–2	3–0	2–1
SK Prostějov	1–3	1–0	4–0	3–1	3–0		3–2	2–5	2–2	1–2	3–0	6–2
SK Židenice	3–1	4–2	2–0	2–1	1–1	1–0		1–3	5–1	1–2	3–3	0–0
Slavia Prague	10–1	14–1	11–5	6–2	3–1	4–4	7–0		5–1	3–1	2–2	2–2
Slezská Ostrava	3–2	6–4	1–2	1–1	3–2	1–2	1–1	1–1		0–7	2–0	1–2
Sparta Prague	2–2	5–1	5–2	5–4	4–3	2–0	2–2	3–1	4–1		4–4	1–2
Viktoria Plzeň	7–1	5–1	6–4	2–2	2–5	4–3	3–1	1–2	5–3	2–4		4–4
Viktoria Žižkov	0–2	1–2	2–4	1–2	2–6	4–2	4–1	1–7	4–4	1–6	4–3	

Source: statistiky1ligy.fotbal.cz
Legend: Blue = home team win; Yellow = draw; Red = away team win.
