= Gejza Kocsis =

Czechoslovak-Hungarian footballer

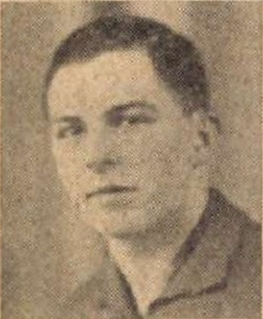
- Gejza Kocsis in 1935

Personal information
- Date of birth: 25 November 1910
- Place of birth: Pozsony, Austria-Hungary (now Bratislava, Slovakia)
- Date of death: 12 March 1958 (aged 47)
- Position: Forward

Senior career*
Years	Team	Apps	(Gls)
1931–1933	Teplitzer FK	?	(14)
1933–1934	Bohemians 1905	?	(20)
1934–1940	Újpest	143	(75)
Total		145+	(109)

International career
1933	Czechoslovakia	1	(1)
1937	Hungary	2	(0)
- * Club domestic league appearances and goals

Gejza Kocsis (Hungarian: Kocsis Géza; 25 November 1910 – 12 March 1958) was a Czechoslovak-Hungarian footballer who played as a forward and appeared for both the Czechoslovakia and Hungary national teams.

== Career ==
Kocsis earned his first and only cap for Czechoslovakia on 6 August 1933 in a friendly against Yugoslavia. He scored the opening goal of the match, which was played in Zagreb and finished as a 1–2 loss. He later represented the Hungary national team, making his first appearance on 11 April 1937 in the 1936–38 Central European International Cup against Switzerland, which finished as a 5–1 win Basel. He made his second and final appearance for Hungary on 25 April 1937 against Italy, also in the Central European International Cup, which finished as a 0–2 loss in Turin.

== Personal life ==
Kocsis died on 12 March 1958 at the age of 47.

== Career statistics ==
=== International ===
Team	Year	Apps	Goals
Czechoslovakia	1933	1	1
Czechoslovakia	Total	1	1
Hungary	1937	2	0
Hungary	Total	2	0
Career total		3	1

=== International goals ===
No.	Date	Venue	Opponent	Score	Result	Competition
1	6 August 1933	Stadion Concordije, Zagreb, Sava Banovina, Kingdom of Yugoslavia	Yugoslavia	1–0	1–2	Friendly
