= 1930–31 Czechoslovak First League =

Czechoslovak First League
- Season: 1930–31
- Champions: Slavia Prague
- Relegated: SK Meteor Praha VIII
- Top goalscorer: Josef Silný (18 goals)

Statistics of Czechoslovak First League in the 1930–31 season. Josef Silný was the league's top scorer with 18 goals.

== Overview ==
It was contested by 8 teams, and Slavia Prague won the championship.

== League standings ==
Pos	Team	Pld	W	D	L	GF	GA	GR	Pts
1	Slavia Prague (C)	14	12	0	2	48	14	3.429	24
2	Sparta Prague	14	10	1	3	59	22	2.682	21
3	Bohemians Prague	14	7	4	3	46	26	1.769	18
4	Viktoria Žižkov	14	7	0	7	34	20	1.700	14
5	SK Kladno	14	4	5	5	28	34	0.824	13
6	SK Náchod	14	5	3	6	24	41	0.585	13
7	Teplitzer FK (O)	14	3	2	9	36	53	0.679	8
8	Meteor Prague VIII (R)	14	0	1	13	14	79	0.177	1

Source: rsssf.com
(C) Champions; (O) Play-off winners; (R) Relegated

== Results ==
Home \ Away	BOH	MET	KLA	NÁC	SLA	SPA	TEP	VŽI
Bohemians Prague		10–0	4–4	6–0	3–2	4–3	3–2	0–4
Meteor Prague VIII	0–7		1–2	1–5	1–5	1–7	3–6	1–6
SK Kladno	1–1	6–1		0–0	0–3	1–6	5–2	1–0
SK Náchod	2–0	1–1	3–3		1–3	2–7	2–1	2–1
Slavia Prague	3–0	5–0	5–1	6–2		3–1	6–2	1–0
Sparta Prague	2–2	3–2	4–1	6–0	2–1		6–2	2–1
Teplitzer FK	3–3	8–1	2–2	4–1	1–4	0–9		2–3
Viktoria Žižkov	0–3	8–1	2–1	2–3	0–1	2–1	5–1	

Source: statistiky1ligy.fotbal.cz
Legend: Blue = home team win; Yellow = draw; Red = away team win.
