= 1962–63 Czechoslovak First League =

Czechoslovak First League
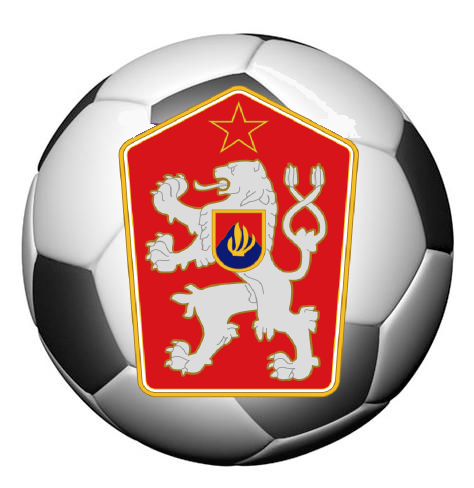
- Season: 1962–63
- Champions: Dukla Prague
- Relegated: Slovan Nitra; Spartak Plzeň; Dynamo Praha
- European Cup: Dukla Prague
- Cup Winners' Cup: Slovan Bratislava
- Fairs Cup: Spartak ZJŠ Brno
- Top goalscorer: Karel Petroš (19 goals)

Statistics of Czechoslovak First League in the 1962–63 season.

== Overview ==
The league was contested by 14 teams, and Dukla Prague won the championship. Karel Petroš was the league's top scorer with 19 goals.

== Stadia and locations ==
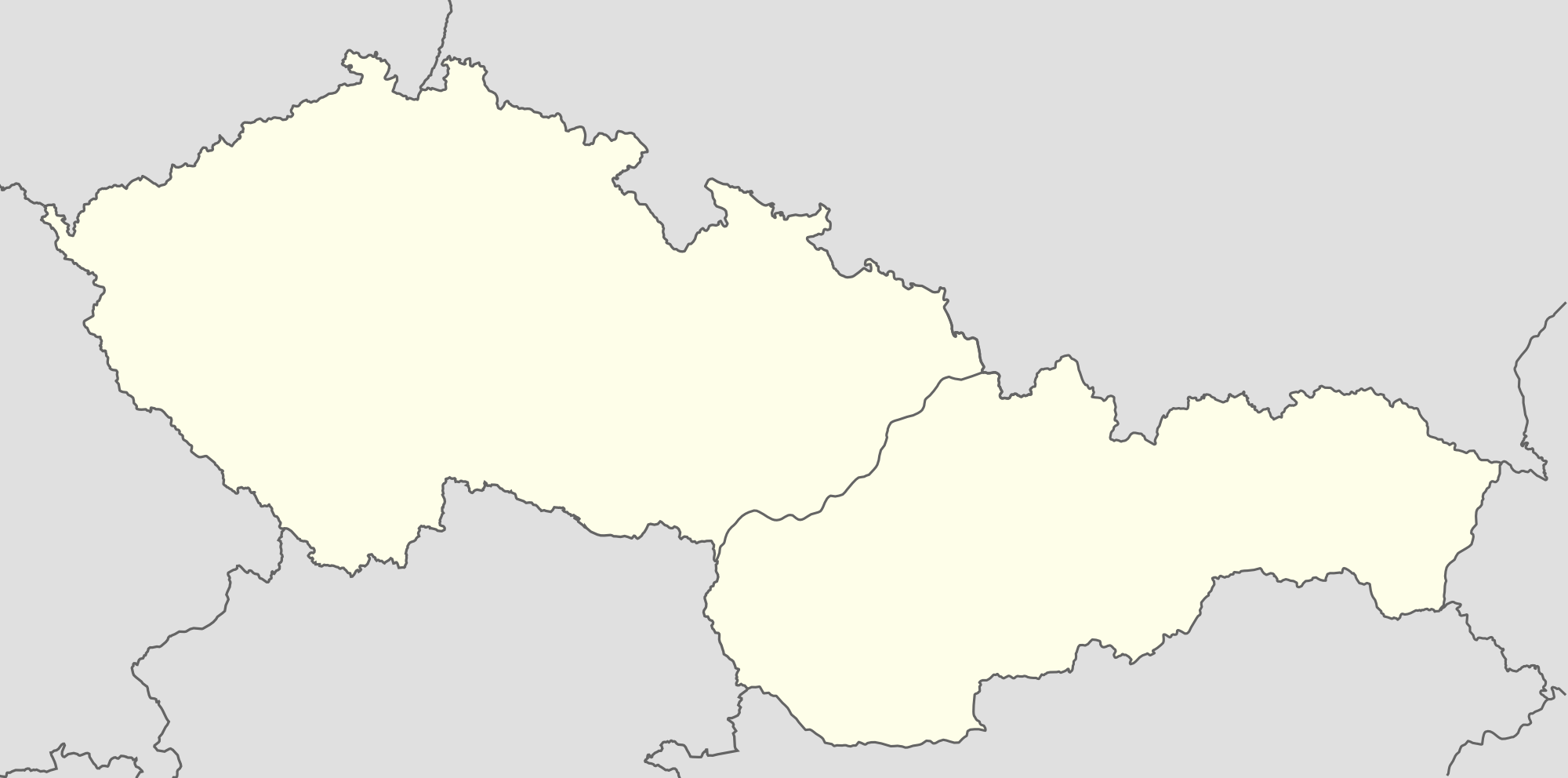
Location of clubs in the 1962–63 Czechoslovak First League

== League standings ==
Pos	Team	Pld	W	D	L	GF	GA	GR	Pts	Qualification or relegation
1	Dukla Prague (C)	26	16	3	7	49	25	1.960	35	Qualification for European Cup preliminary round
2	Jednota Trenčín	26	12	8	6	36	24	1.500	32	
3	Baník Ostrava	26	14	3	9	47	33	1.424	31	
4	Slovnaft Bratislava	26	13	5	8	37	26	1.423	31	
5	Spartak Hradec Králové	26	11	5	10	38	36	1.056	27	
6	ČKD Prague	26	11	4	11	37	41	0.902	26	
7	Slovan Bratislava	26	10	5	11	45	40	1.125	25	Qualification for Cup Winners' Cup first round
8	Spartak ZJŠ Brno	26	9	7	10	34	37	0.919	25	Invitation for Inter-Cities Fairs Cup first round
9	Spartak Prague Sokolovo	26	7	10	9	33	32	1.031	24	
10	Tatran Prešov	26	10	4	12	46	46	1.000	24	
11	SONP Kladno	26	9	6	11	38	50	0.760	24	
12	Slovan Nitra (R)	26	8	7	11	36	45	0.800	23	Relegation to Czechoslovak Second League
13	Spartak Plzeň (R)	26	8	3	15	34	59	0.576	19	Relegation to Czechoslovak Second League
14	Dynamo Prague (R)	26	6	6	14	30	46	0.652	18	Relegation to Czechoslovak Second League

Source: rsssf.com
(C) Champions; (R) Relegated

== Results ==
Home \ Away	OST	ČKD	DUK	DYN	TRE	SLO	NIT	SLV	KLA	HRK	PLZ	SPA	BRN	PRE
Baník Ostrava		2–2	0–1	2–1	3–0	3–0	1–0	0–0	0–2	4–1	1–2	4–0	2–4	5–2
ČKD Prague	1–1		2–1	2–1	2–2	1–0	3–0	1–2	2–0	0–2	4–2	0–4	2–2	3–2
Dukla Prague	2–1	2–0		2–0	6–2	1–0	5–0	2–1	4–1	0–3	3–0	1–0	2–0	2–2
Dynamo Prague	1–5	0–1	0–3		0–2	2–2	2–2	0–4	1–1	2–1	4–0	2–1	3–1	4–0
Jednota Trenčín	1–2	2–0	1–0	1–0		2–0	0–0	1–2	3–0	4–0	2–0	1–1	4–1	4–2
Slovan Bratislava	0–1	1–0	2–3	1–0	0–0		5–1	0–1	6–2	4–0	3–1	1–1	0–0	3–1
Slovan Nitra	3–0	2–1	1–2	2–2	1–0	2–3		2–1	1–1	1–3	2–0	0–0	5–0	4–1
Slovnaft Bratislava	1–2	1–2	1–0	0–0	2–0	2–5	1–0		6–1	1–0	3–0	2–1	1–0	1–0
SONP Kladno	1–2	2–1	1–1	3–0	1–1	1–0	2–0	2–1		4–2	3–1	1–1	1–1	4–1
Spartak Hradec Králové	2–0	1–3	1–1	3–1	0–0	3–0	1–2	4–2	2–0		2–0	0–0	3–0	1–1
Spartak Plzeň	0–3	0–3	0–3	2–1	1–1	6–6	4–0	0–0	2–1	3–0		5–0	0–2	1–0
Spartak Sokolovo Prague	2–1	1–0	2–0	1–1	0–1	1–2	2–2	1–1	3–1	1–1	6–0		1–2	1–0
Spartak ZJŠ Brno	0–1	4–1	2–1	1–2	0–1	1–0	1–1	0–0	5–1	1–0	4–1	1–1		1–1
Tatran Prešov	4–1	4–0	2–1	3–0	0–0	4–1	4–2	2–0	3–1	1–2	2–3	2–1	2–0	

Legend: Blue = home team win; Yellow = draw; Red = away team win.

== Attendances ==
No.	Club	Average
1	Spartak Praha	26,077
2	Dynamo Praha	19,577
3	Baník Ostrava	15,195
4	Spartak Brno	12,904
5	ČKD Praha	12,731
6	Slovan Bratislava	12,154
7	Spartak Plzeň	10,212
8	Spartak Hradec Králové	9,978
9	Jednota Trenčín	9,862
10	Dukla Praha	9,615
11	Tatran Prešov	8,808
12	Slovnaft Bratislava	8,231
13	SONP Kladno	7,807
14	Slovan Nitra	6,838
