= František Kloz =

Czech footballer

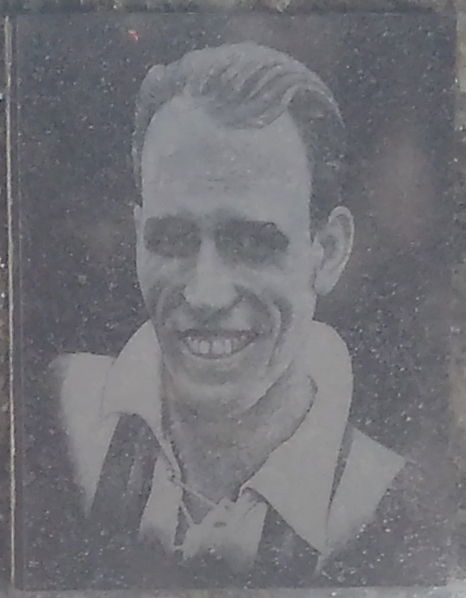

Personal information
- Date of birth: 19 May 1905
- Place of birth: Mlékosrby, Bohemia, Austria-Hungary
- Date of death: 13 June 1945 (aged 40)
- Place of death: Louny, Czechoslovakia
- Position: Striker

Youth career
- Nový Bydžov
- Chlumec nad Cidlinou

Senior career*
Years	Team	Apps	(Gls)
1926–1927	Slavoj Roudnice nad Labem		
1927–1928	SK Roudnice		
1928–1930	SK Kladno		
1931	SK Slavia Praha		
1932	SK Kladno		
1933	Sparta Prague		
1934–1940	SK Kladno		
1940–1941	SK Slaný		
1941–1943	Slavoj Roudnice nad Labem		
1943–1945	SK Vinařice		

International career
1929–1937	Czechoslovakia	10	(6)

Managerial career
- 1942–1943: SK Kladno
- * Club domestic league appearances and goals

František Kloz (19 May 1905 – 13 June 1945) was a Czech football player.

== Club career ==
Kloz played most of his career for SK Kladno and became its manager in 1942-43. He scored 175 goals in 192 matches in the Czechoslovak First League (172 for Kladno, 3 for Slavia), making him the third highest scorer in the competition's history. He was twice the top goalscorer of the league, the first time in the 1929-30 season with 15 and the second in the 1936-37 season with 28 goals.

== International career ==
He played for Czechoslovakia national team, from 1929 to 1937 - scoring six goals in 10 matches. He made his international debut on 28 October 1929 in a Friendly against Yugoslavia, and he only needed 2 minutes to leave his mark as he netted the opening goal in a 4-3 win. However, it took him 7 years to score another goal for his nation, but the wait was worth it as he scored not one, but four goals against Hungary in a 1936–38 Central European Cup fixture. His last international goal was a late winner against Austria in 24 October 1937.

=== International goals ===
Czechoslovakia score listed first, score column indicates score after each Kloz goal.

International goals by cap, date, venue, opponent, score, result and competition
No.	Cap	Date	Venue	Opponent	Score	Result	Competition
1	1	28 October 1929	Stadion Letná, Prague, Czechoslovakia	Yugoslavia	1–0	4–3	Friendly
2	4	18 October 1936	Stadion Letná, Prague, Czechoslovakia	Hungary	1–1	5–2	1936–38 Central European Cup
3	4	18 October 1936	Stadion Letná, Prague, Czechoslovakia	Hungary	2–1	5–2	1936–38 Central European Cup
4	4	18 October 1936	Stadion Letná, Prague, Czechoslovakia	Hungary	3–2	5–2	1936–38 Central European Cup
5	4	18 October 1936	Stadion Letná, Prague, Czechoslovakia	Hungary	4–2	5–2	1936–38 Central European Cup
6	8	24 October 1937	Stadion Letná, Prague, Czechoslovakia	Austria	2–1	2–1	1936–38 Central European Cup

== World War II ==
An anti-Nazi during German occupation of Czechoslovakia in World War II, in May 1945 Kloz went out to fight as a volunteer non-soldier against German Nazi occupants. He was seriously wounded on 7 May, when his party sought to capture a German-held ammunition store two days before the enemy surrendered in Czechoslovakia. He died a month later in a hospital in Louny.

== Legacy ==
Kloz is the most famous player in the history of SK Kladno. The team's home stadium is named after him.
