= 1929–30 Czechoslovak First League =

Czechoslovak First League
- Season: 1929–30
- Champions: Slavia Prague
- Relegated: ČAFC Vinohrady; Čechie Karlín
- Top goalscorer: František Kloz (15 goals)

Statistics of Czechoslovak First League in the 1929–30 season.

== Overview ==
It was contested by eight teams, and Slavia Prague won the championship. František Kloz was the league's top scorer with 15 goals.

== League standings ==
Pos	Team	Pld	W	D	L	GF	GA	GR	Pts
1	Slavia Prague (C)	14	14	0	0	64	13	4.923	28
2	Sparta	14	9	0	5	46	25	1.840	18
3	Viktoria Žižkov	14	8	0	6	37	36	1.028	16
4	Bohemians AFK Vršovice	14	7	1	6	45	33	1.364	15
5	Teplitzer FK	14	7	0	7	36	37	0.973	14
6	SK Kladno	14	5	1	8	32	40	0.800	11
7	ČAFC Vinohrady (R)	14	3	0	11	18	65	0.277	6
8	Čechie Karlín (R)	14	2	0	12	21	50	0.420	4

Source: rsssf.com
(C) Champions; (R) Relegated

== Results ==
Home \ Away	BOH	VIN	KAR	KLA	SLA	SPA	TEP	VŽI
Bohemians Prague		4–0	4–1	5–1	0–2	1–2	6–1	2–3
ČAFC Vinohrady	0–4		5–3	1–7	0–10	1–4	1–3	3–4
Čechie Karlín	1–6	1–2		2–6	1–3	1–4	4–3	2–4
SK Kladno	3–3	1–2	2–3		1–2	3–2	3–1	1–2
Slavia Prague	4–3	11–0	3–2	7–0		2–0	4–1	3–1
Sparta Prague	7–2	4–0	3–0	5–1	2–3		5–2	5–3
Teplitzer FK	7–3	4–2	2–0	3–0	1–2	3–2		2–0
Viktoria Žižkov	1–2	5–1	3–0	2–3	1–8	3–1	5–3	

Source: statistiky1ligy.fotbal.cz
Legend: Blue = home team win; Yellow = draw; Red = away team win.
