= 1946–47 Czechoslovak First League =

Czechoslovak First League
- Season: 1946–47
- Dates: 23 August 1946 – 28 June 1947
- Champions: Slavia Prague
- Relegated: SK Kladno; Baťa Zlín; SK Židenice; SK Olomouc ASO; FK Viktoria Žižkov; SK Libeň
- Top goalscorer: Josef Bican (43 goals)

Statistics of Czechoslovak First League in the 1946–47 season.

== Overview ==
It was contested by 14 teams, and Slavia Prague won the championship. Josef Bican was the league's top scorer with 43 goals.

AC Sparta toured Great Britain opening with a 2 – 2 draw against Arsenal on 2 October 1946.

== Stadia and locations ==
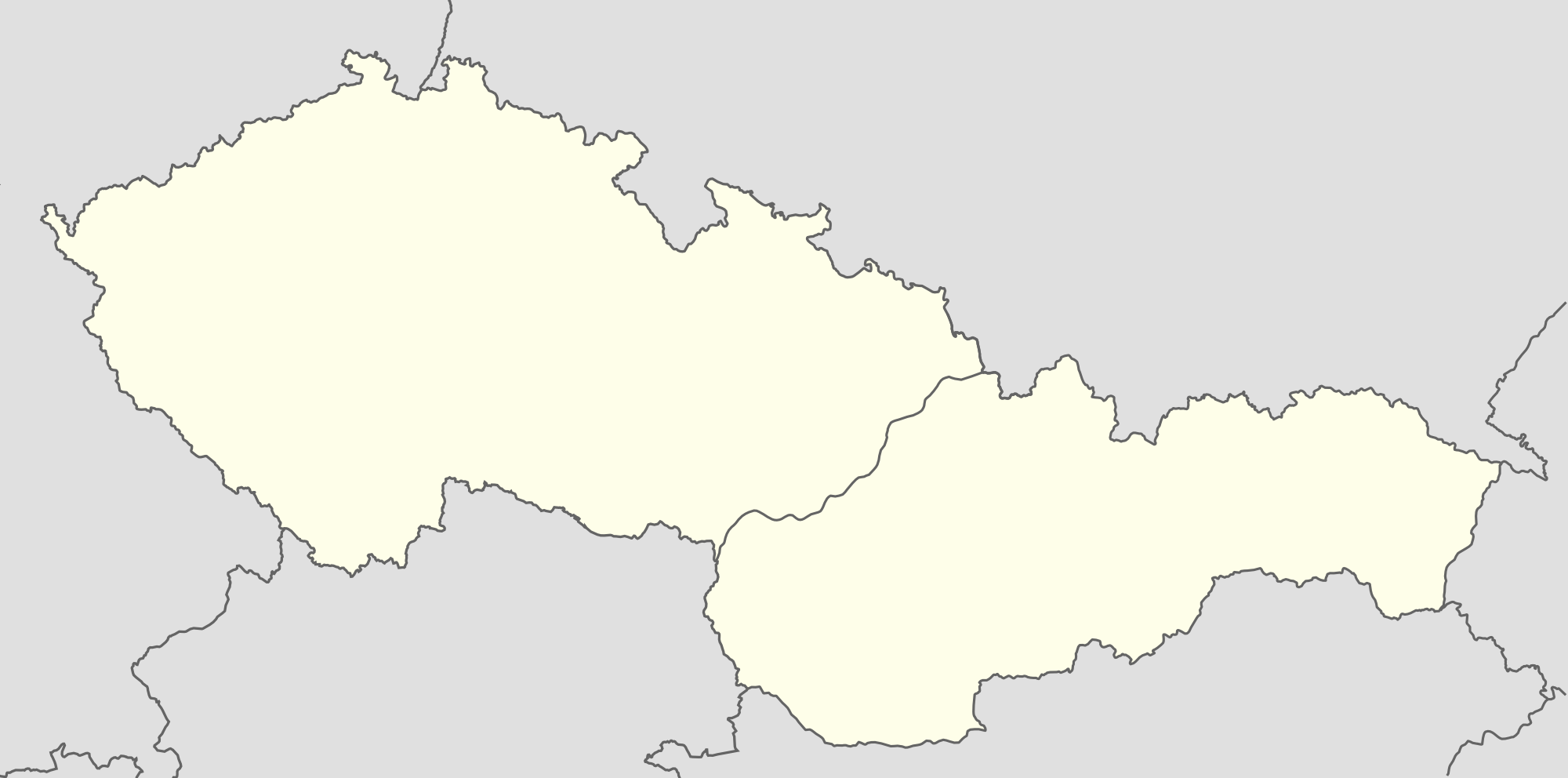
Location of clubs in the 1946–47 Czechoslovak First League

== League standings ==
Pos	Team	Pld	W	D	L	GF	GA	GR	Pts	Qualification or relegation
1	Slavia Prague (C)	26	19	2	5	110	54	2.037	40	Won the league
2	Sparta Prague	26	18	3	5	101	35	2.886	39	
3	SK Kladno (E)	26	15	2	9	68	56	1.214	32	Expelled from the league
4	ŠK Žilina	26	13	5	8	62	50	1.240	31	
5	Bohemians Prague	26	13	3	10	77	61	1.262	29	
6	ŠK Bratislava	26	13	2	11	78	48	1.625	28	
7	Slezská Ostrava	26	12	3	11	62	57	1.088	27	
8	Jednota Košice	26	12	3	11	63	60	1.050	27	
9	Viktoria Plzeň	26	11	5	10	67	83	0.807	27	
10	Baťa Zlín (E)	26	9	4	13	63	66	0.955	22	Expelled from the league
11	SK Židenice (E)	26	10	2	14	64	78	0.821	22	Expelled from the league
12	SK Olomouc ASO (R)	26	10	2	14	44	57	0.772	22	Relegation to the 1947–48 Czechoslovak Second League
13	Viktoria Žižkov (R)	26	5	2	19	45	108	0.417	12	Relegation to the 1947–48 Czechoslovak Second League
14	SK Libeň (R)	26	3	0	23	25	116	0.216	6	Relegation to the 1947–48 Czechoslovak Second League

Source: rsssf.com
(C) Champions; (E) Eliminated; (R) Relegated

== Results ==
Home \ Away	ZLÍ	BOH	KOŠ	SKB	KLA	LIB	OLO	ŽID	ŽIL	SLA	OST	SPA	PLZ	VŽI
Baťa Zlín		2–3	4–0	1–4	4–4	7–0	4–2	4–0	0–2	3–5	1–1	2–5	2–2	4–0
Bohemians Prague	5–1		2–2	3–1	0–1	6–0	3–1	3–4	2–2	1–8	4–2	1–5	5–1	9–0
Jednota Košice	2–2	5–1		3–2	5–0	4–1	3–0	3–0	4–0	0–1	3–1	1–4	2–0	5–2
ŠK Bratislava	7–1	1–1	3–2		1–2	4–0	3–0	4–0	0–1	3–2	4–1	1–3	7–2	6–1
SK Kladno	2–4	2–5	8–2	5–2		3–1	2–2	3–2	1–0	1–4	3–1	4–2	3–1	6–1
SK Libeň	3–0	1–4	2–4	1–6	2–1		3–0	1–4	0–3	1–10	1–6	1–6	3–4	2–4
SK Olomouc ASO	1–0	1–4	3–2	2–0	3–0	2–0		4–3	0–2	2–4	3–1	2–0	6–2	4–1
SK Židenice	2–0	3–5	6–3	1–6	2–0	5–0	2–1		7–2	3–3	1–2	1–2	4–6	0–3
ŠK Žilina	4–3	5–2	1–1	3–0	1–2	9–0	2–2	0–3		1–4	3–2	1–1	6–1	4–2
Slavia Prague	4–2	2–1	6–4	3–2	3–2	6–2	4–1	5–2	3–0		1–1	3–5	3–4	10–1
Slezská Ostrava	1–4	2–1	3–0	4–1	2–5	2–0	4–2	1–1	1–3	2–5		4–1	6–2	4–3
Sparta Prague	2–3	4–1	4–0	3–1	4–0	10–0	5–0	8–0	1–1	4–0	1–2		8–1	8–1
Viktoria Plzeň	4–2	3–2	1–2	3–3	1–5	1–0	2–0	8–2	6–2	4–3	2–1	2–2		1–1
Viktoria Žižkov	1–3	2–3	3–1	0–6	1–3	5–0	1–0	1–6	2–4	2–8	2–5	2–3	3–3	

Source: statistiky1ligy.fotbal.cz
Legend: Blue = home team win; Yellow = draw; Red = away team win.
