= SK Pardubice =

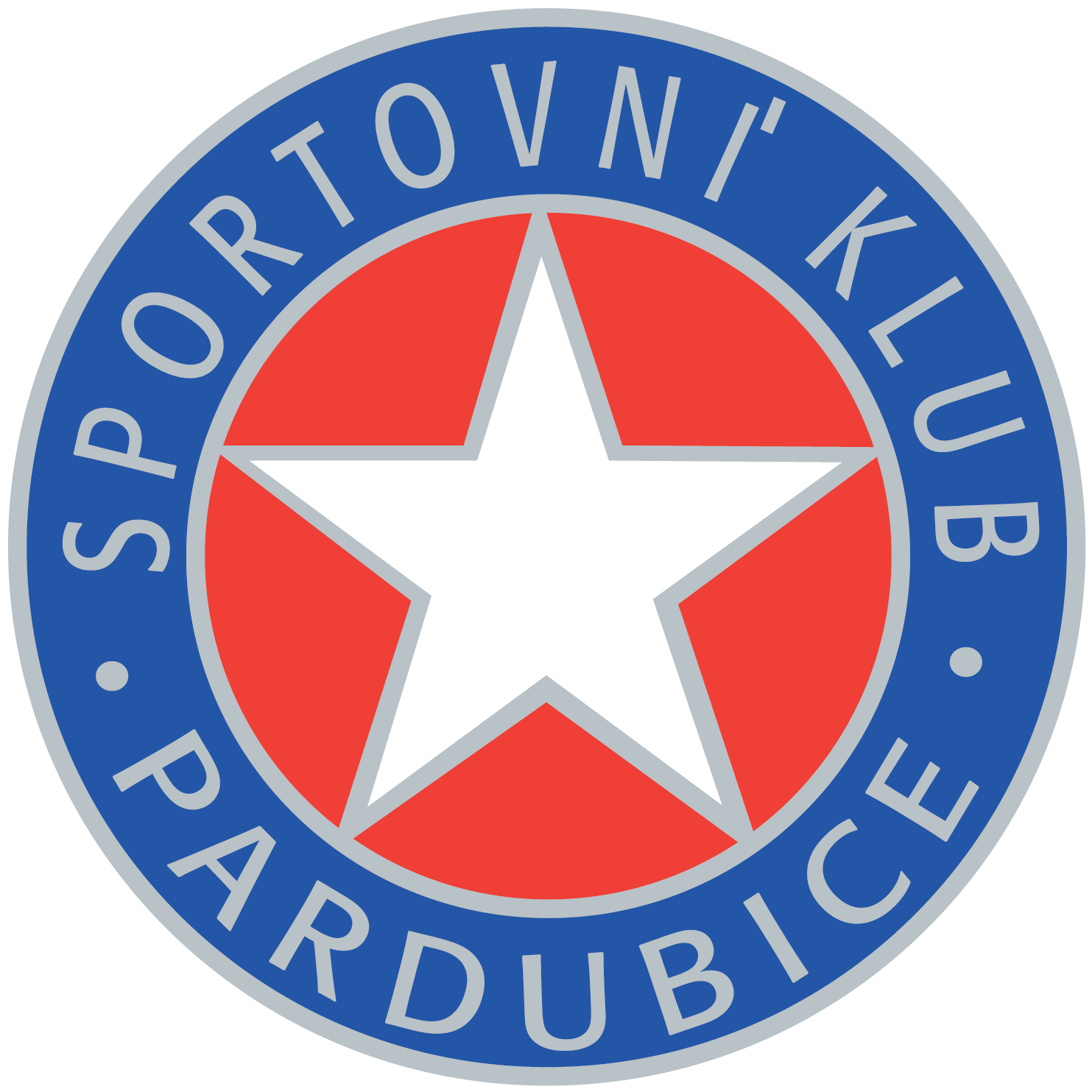
- Full name: SK Pardubice
- Founded: 1905
- Dissolved: 1960
- Ground: Letní stadion

SK Pardubice was a Czech football club from the city of Pardubice, which played in the Czechoslovak First League between 1937 and 1946. It was founded in 1905 and dissolved in 1960. The club's greatest success was finishing third in the 1938–39 Czechoslovak First League, an achievement repeated in the subsequent two seasons.

== Historical names ==
- 1905 – SK Pardubice
- 1948 – Sokol MZK Pardubice
- 1949 – ČSSZ Pardubice
- 1953 – Tatran Pardubice
