= SK Libeň =

- Full name: SK Libeň
- Founded: 1903
- Dissolved: 1951

SK Libeň was a Czech football club located in the cadastral area of Libeň in the city of Prague and founded in 1903. The club played seven seasons of top-flight football in the Czechoslovak era, taking part in the inaugural season of the Czechoslovak First League. The club's last season in the top flight was in the 1946–47 Czechoslovak First League. The club merged with Bratrství Sparta in 1951 and became defunct.

== Historical names ==
- 1903: SK Libeň
- 1948: Sokol Libeň
- 1949: ČKD Sokolovo Libeň
- 1951: Merged with Bratrství Sparta
