= Čechie Karlín =

- Full name: Čechie Karlín
- Founded: 1898
- Dissolved: 2004

Čechie Karlín was a Czechoslovak football club from the town of Karlín – later incorporated into the city of Prague. The club played sporadically in the Czechoslovak First League between its inaugural season in 1925, and 1951, when it appeared in the top division for the last time. Founded in 1898, it was one of the first football clubs in the country. In 2004 the club merged with TJ Dubeč to form a new club called Čechie Dubeč.

== Historical names ==
- 1898 Sportovní kroužek Slavoj Karlín
- 1899 Čechie Karlín
- 1948 Sokol Čechie Karlín
- 1950 Sokol OD Karlín
- 1951 Sokol ČKD Dukla Karlín
- 1953 Spartak Karlín Dukla
- 1967 Čechie Karlín
- 1996 Čechie Karlín BVB
- 2002 Čechie Karlín
