= Teplitzer FK =

- Full name: Teplitzer FK
- Founded: 1903; 122 years ago
- Dissolved: 1940; 85 years ago

Teplitzer FK was a Czechoslovak football club from the town of Teplice, which played seven seasons in the Czechoslovak First League. It was founded in 1903 as a football club associating the local German population. The club was the first from Czechoslovakia to travel to the New World, making a 1922 trip to Argentina, Uruguay and Brazil, where the team played six matches, including one against Club Nacional de Football and other against Santos. The club's best result was finishing fourth in the 1933–34 Czechoslovak First League. Teplitzer also took part in the 1934 Mitropa Cup, losing both of their matches against Juventus. Rudolf Zosel was the club's top league scorer, amassing 26 goals. The club later played under the German association, as Teplice became a part of Reichsgau Sudetenland in accordance with the Munich Agreement. The club ceased to exist in 1940.
