= TTS Trenčín =

- Full name: Telovýchovná jednota Trenčiansky telocvičný spolok Trenčín
- Founded: 1904; 121 years ago
- Dissolved: 1993 (merged with Ozeta Dukla Trenčin)
- Ground: Trenčín
Home colours

TTS Trenčín was a Slovak football club, playing in the town of Trenčín.

== History ==
The club was founded in 1904 as Trencsény Torna Egyesület (TTE).

TTS Trenčín first played in the top flight of Slovakia during World War II, when Slovak and Czech competitions were separated. During the sixties the team returned to the top flight, under new name Jednota Trenčín. The best place was in 1963 when the club became second after Dukla Prague. In 1966 and 1968 the team participated in the Mitropa Cup. In 1972 the club was relegated.

After three seasons Jednota returned and played in the top flight until 1980. After this the team could never return and was even relegated to the third level in 1981. However Jednota was promoted immediately and changed the name back to TTS. In 1985 TTS was relegated to the third level and did not manage to come back. During the last Czechoslovak season in 1992/93 the team ended one place above newly founded Ozeta Dukla Trenčin. Afterwards both clubs merged.

== Honours ==
=== Domestic ===
- Czechoslovak First League
  - Runners-up (1): 1962–63
  - Third place (1): 1967–68
- Slovak Cup
  - Winners (1): 1978

=== European ===
- Mitropa Cup
  - Runners-up (1): 1966

== Notable players ==
Had international caps for their respective countries. Players whose name is listed in bold represented their countries while playing for TTS.

- (Czechoslovakia) **Milan Albrecht**
- (Czechoslovakia) **Pavol Bencz**
- (Czechoslovakia) Ivan Bilský
- (Czechoslovakia) Ladislav Józsa
- (Czechoslovakia) Ján Kapko
- (Bulgaria) (Czechoslovakia) Bozhin Laskov
- (Czechoslovakia) **Vojtech Masný**
- (Czechoslovakia) Emil Pažický
- (Czechoslovakia) Miroslav Siva
- (Czechoslovakia) Anton Švajlen
