= FK Náchod =

- Full name: FK Náchod s.r.o.
- Founded: 1901; 125 years ago
- Ground: Stadion Běloves
- Capacity: 1,700
- League: Czech Fourth Division – Divize C
- 2022–23: 16th
- Website: http://fknachod.sklub.cz/
Home colours	Away colours

FK Náchod is a football club located in Náchod, Czech Republic. The club is most notable for playing in its country's top division, the Czechoslovak First League, in the 1930s. It currently plays in Divize C, which is in the fourth tier of the Czech football system.

In 2001–2011 the club played under the name FK Náchod-Deštné. In 2011 it was divided into two clubs.

== Historical names ==
Former club logo

- 1902 — SK Náchod
- 1947 — DSO Sokol Tepna Náchod-Plhov
- 1948 — DSO Sokol Rubena Náchod merger with SK Kudrnáč Náchod
- 1961 — TJ Jiskra Náchod
- 1963 — TJ Jiskra Tepna Náchod
- 1964 — TJ Tepna Náchod
- 1974 — TJ Náchod
- 1994 — SK SOMOS Náchod
- 2001 — FK Náchod-Deštné merger with TJ Sokol Deštné v Orl. horách
- 2011 — FK Náchod
