= List of Slavia Prague records and statistics =

Slavia Prague is a professional football club competing in the Czech First League and is one of four teams never relegated from the league since its inception in September 1993 after the country's rebirth. In terms of football achievements Slavia is the second-most successful club of the Czechoslovak First League and acquired second-most points in the Czech first league. Since 1925 there have been 71 completed seasons of Czechoslovak league and 28 completed Czech league seasons, in which Slavia has won 21 league titles, nine Czech cups, two doubles (in 2019 and 2021) and one Czech-Slovak Supercup.

In the title-winning 2020-21 the team completed an entire season undefeated and set a Czech record for the longest top-flight unbeaten league run at 46 games between 2020 and 2021.

All statistics are correct as of 30 May 2021.

== Statistics ==
Slavia Prague's tally of 21 League titles is the second-highest in Czech football, after Sparta Prague. As of May 2021, they are one of five teams, the others being FC Viktoria Plzeň, FC Baník Ostrava and FC Slovan Liberec, that has won the Czech Football League since its reformation in 1993. Slavia also holds 5 Czech Cups and has achieved two League and Cup "doubles" (in 2019 and 2021).

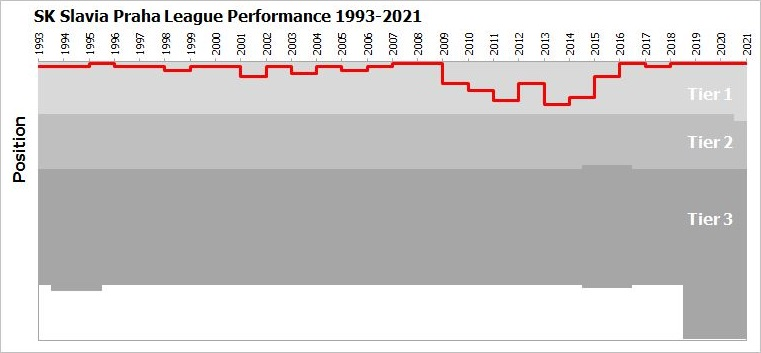
Slavia Prague league performance

Slavia is one of three teams that have not been relegated from the top tier of Czech football since 1993, the other two being Sparta Prague and Slovan Liberec.

Vlastimil Kopecký holds the record for Slavia appearances, having played 953 first-team matches between 1932 and 1950, while the second most appearances are linked to František Veselý (920) followed by Bohumil Smolík (772). Josef Bican is the club's top goalscorer with 417 goals between 1937 and 1948. The only other player to score 200 or more goals in the Czech or Czechoslovak top tier is Vlastimil Kopecký. Antonín Puč spent almost two decades in red and white, mostly as a left-winger, and scored 112 league goals for the club.

Taking into consideration solely the Czech First League statistics since 1993, the record for the most Slavia Prague appearances is held by Milan Škoda (214), followed by David Hubáček (199) and goalkeeper Radek Černý (193). Slavia's top league goal scorer since 1993 is Milan Škoda (77), followed by Stanislav Vlček (44) and Tomáš Došek (40). The most clean sheets by Slavia goalkeeper were 86 by Radek Černý, followed by Ondřej Kolář (45) and Jan Stejskal (42). In the 2019/20 season Ondřej Kolář has established few records for Slavia's goalkeeping – the most clean sheets in a single season (23) and the most consecutive minutes without conceding a goal (788 mins), while Slavia Prague's defense conceded 12 goals in the entire season – another best. Kolář also became the fastest goalkeeper of the Czech First League to keep 50 clean sheets, which took him 101 games (with all clubs).

== Team records ==
Czech League			Czechoslovak League
Record	Detail	All time	Overall record	Detail
GP 854 W 455 D 224 L 175 Pts 1,573 (GF 1,427 GA 777) Win% .533 Pts per game 1.84		Record	GP 1,565 W 784 D 292 L 489 Pts 1,860 (GF 3,554 GA 2,335) Win% .501 Pts per game 1.19
3.79	(counting 28 seasons – from 1993 to 2021)	Average finish	5.08	(counting 64 seasons – from 1925 to 1993)
2nd	(counting 28 seasons – from 1993 to 2021)	Median finish	4th	(counting 64 seasons – from 1925 to 1993)
9–1	Uherské Hradiště (1995–96)	Home win	15–1	České Budějovice (1947–48)
8–1	Příbram (2016–17)	Away win	11–0	Čechie Praha (1925–26)
0–7	Teplice (2013–14)	Home defeat	1–6	Spartak Sokolovo (1955)
0–5	Baník Ostrava (1998–99)	Away defeat	1–7	Baník Ostrava (1954) and Slovan Nitra (1959–60)
10	9−1 against Uherské Hradiště (1995–96)	Most goals in a match	16	11−5 against SK Náchod (1939–40) and 15−1 against České Budějovice (1947–48)
Record	Season	Single season	Record	Season
86 (34 matches)	2020–21	Most points	45 (26 matches)	1943–44
30 (30 matches)	2013–14	Fewest points	14 (26 matches)	1960–61
26 (34 and 35 matches)	2020–21 and 2019–20	Most wins	22 (26 matches)	1943–44
8 (30 matches)	2011–12 and 2013–14	Fewest wins	5 (7 matches)	1927
13 (30 matches)	2010–11	Most draws	12 (30 matches)	1969–70 and 1977–78
1 (30 matches)	1995–96	Fewest draws	0 (14 matches)	1929–30 and 1930–31
16 (30 matches)	2013–14	Most defeats	17 (26 matches)	1960–61
0 (34 matches)	2020–21	Fewest defeats	0 (14 matches)	1929–30
85 (34 matches)	2020–21	Most goals scored	131 (26 matches)	1943–44
24 (30 matches)	2013–14	Fewest goals scored	22 (13 matches)	1953
51 (30 matches)	2013–14	Most goals conceded	62 (26 matches)	1951
12 (35 matches)	2019–20	Fewest goals conceded	10 (9 matches)	1925
Record	Season	Consecutive...	Record	Season
3	From 2018−19 to 2020−21	Seasons with a title	4	From 1939–40 to 1942–43
11	From 1995–96 to 2007−08	Seasons without a title	46	From 1947–48 to 1992–93
11	From 8 November 1999 to 2 April 2000	Wins	23	From 28 April 1929 to 9 January 1930
15	From 27 April 2019 to 22 February 2020	Home wins	16	From 22 November 1942 to 16 April 1944
7	From 24 September 2006 to 1 April 2007	Away wins	7	From 9 April 1944 to 30 September 1945
54	From 8 March 2020 to 26 September 2021	Matches without a defeat	21	From 30 August 1936 to 16 May 1937
59	From 18 August 2018 to 5 February 2022	Home matches without a defeat	28	From 17 August 1975 to 25 April 1977
27	From 26 May 2020 to 19 September 2021	Away matches without a defeat	12	(Two times – most recent:) From 2 October 1943 to 30 September 1945
4	From 17 September 2006 to 5 November 2006	Draws	5	From 15 March 1970 to 31 March 1970
27	From 27 August 1995 to 17 May 1996	Matches without a draw	27	From 22 November 1942 to 28 November 1943
10	From 20 November 2011 to 1 April 2012	Matches without a win	16	From 30 August 1956 to 28 April 1957
6	From 29 October 2000 to 12 March 2001	Matches without a home win	9	From 10 June 1956 to 14 April 1957
17	From 20 November 2011 24 February 2013	Matches without an away win	22	From 10 December 1977 to 30 May 1979
5	From 30 August 2014 to 4 October 2014	Defeats	5	From 24 October 1959 to 29 November 1959
4	From 5 August 2013 to 28 September 2013	Home defeats	4	From 5 April 1950 to 3 June 1950
5	From 18 March 2015 to 9 May 2015	Away defeats	14	From 22 April 1983 to 18 March 1984
21	From 17 September 1995 to 28 April 1996	Matches with a goal scored	105	From 3 September 1939 to 16 April 1944
5	From 15 April 2007 to 7 May 2007	Matches without a goal scored	3	(Twelve times – most recent:) From 16 November 1981 to 6 December 1981
10	From 30 August 2014 to 23 November 2014	Matches with a conceded goal	21	(Two times – most recent:) From 28 March 1954 to 13 March 1955
6	From 27 October 2019 to 6 December 2019	Matches without a conceded goal	6	From 22 November 1992 to 14 March 1993
506 minutes	From 8 April 2007 to 10 May 2007	Time without scoring a goal
651 minutes	From 19 October 2019 to 15 December 2019	Time without conceding a goal

== Player records ==
Czech League			Czechoslovak League
Record	Player (season)	All time	Record	Player (season)
10	Radek Černý (from 1996 to 2014) and Martin Latka (from 2003 to 2016)	Most seasons played
214	Milan Škoda (from 2011 to 2020)	Most appearances	953	Vlastimil Kopecký (from 1932 to 1950)
17,312 (182 matches)	David Hubáček (from 2005 to 2013)	Most minutes played
77 (214 matches)	Milan Škoda (from 2011 to 2020)	Most goals scored	417 (246 matches)	Josef Bican (from 1937 to 1948 and later from 1953 to 1955)
38 (104 matches)	Pavel Horváth (from 1996 to 2000)	Most assists provided
86 (193 matches)	Radek Černý (from 1996 to 2014)	Most clean sheets
178 (193 matches)	Radek Černý (from 1996 to 2014)	Most goals conceded
16y 5m 18d	Ivo Táborský on 28 October 2001 against SFC Opava	Youngest player to appear in a match
16y 11m 17d	Michal Švec on 7 March 2004 against FK Jablonec	Youngest player to start in a match
17y 2m 9d	Tomáš Necid on 22 October 2006 against FK Jablonec	Youngest player to score in a match
21y 0m 1d	Tomáš Souček on 28 February 2016 against Baník Ostrava	Youngest player to score a hat-trick
40y 7m 24d	Martin Vaniak on 28 May 2011 against Bohemians Praha	Oldest player to appear in a match
40y 7m 24d	Martin Vaniak on 28 May 2011 against Bohemians Praha	Oldest player to start in a match
36y 10m 6d	Pavel Kuka on 25 May 2005 against FC Zlín	Oldest player to score in a match
32y 7m 28d	Pavel Kuka on 16 March 2001 against Sparta Praha	Oldest player to score a hat-trick
7 minutes	Mojmír Chytil on 25 February 2024 against FK Pardubice	Fastest hat-trick
Record	Player (season)	Single season	Record	Player (season)
34	Tomáš Souček (2018–19)	Most appearances
2,970	Ondřej Kolář (2018–19)	Most minutes played
19 (30 matches)	Milan Škoda (2014–15)	Most goals scored	57 (26 matches)	Josef Bican (1943–44)
12	Ivo Ulich (1999–2000)	Most assists provided
23 (31 matches)	Ondřej Kolář (2019–20)	Most clean sheets
32 (15 matches)	Radek Černý (2000–01)	Most goals conceded
Record	Player	Milestones	Record	Player
133	Milan Škoda (from 18 February 2012 to 25 February 2017)	Fewest matches to score 50 goals
		Fewest matches to score 100 goals
85	Ondřej Kolář (from 17 February 2018 to 8 November 2020)	Fewest matches for 50 clean sheets
		Fewest matches for 100 clean sheets
Record	Player	Consecutive...	Record	Player
9	Radek Černý (from 1996 to 2005), Luboš Kozel (from 1993 to 2002) and Milan Škoda (from 2012 to 2020)	Seasons with at least one appearance
6	Milan Škoda (from 2014 to 2020)	Seasons with at least one goal scored
7	Stanislav Tecl (from 24 August to 21 October 2012)	Matches with a goal scored
173	David Hubáček (from 20 August 2005 to 30 April 2012)	Matches without a goal scored	231	Jiří Hildebrandt (from 29 October 1955 to 7 December 1968)
788 minutes	Ondřej Kolář (from 21 July 2019 to 19 October 2019)	Time without conceding a goal

=== Most appearances ===
Appearances include official and unofficial games.
#	Name	Matches
1	(Czech Republic) Frantisek Planicka	969
2	(Czech Republic) (Kingdom of Bohemia) Vlastimil Kopecky	953
3	(Czech Republic) Frantisek Vesely	920
4	(Czech Republic) Dusan Herda	564
5	(Czech Republic) (Kingdom of Bohemia) (Austria) Josef Bican	514
6	(Czech Republic) Peter Herda	495
7	(Czech Republic) Antonin Puc	491
8	(Czech Republic) Frantisek Svoboda	479
9	(Kingdom of Bohemia) Josef Bělka	428
10	(Kingdom of Bohemia) Richard Veselý	412

=== Most goals ===
Appearances include official and unofficial games.
#	Name	Goals
1	(Czech Republic) (Kingdom of Bohemia) (Austria) Josef Bican	1137
2	(Kingdom of Bohemia) Jan Kosek	819
3	(Czech Republic) (Kingdom of Bohemia) Vlastimil Kopecky	715
4	(Czech Republic) Antonin Puc	437
5	(Kingdom of Bohemia) Josef Bělka	422
6	(Czech Republic) Frantisek Svoboda	381
7	(Czech Republic) (Austria) Jan Vaník	349
8	(Kingdom of Bohemia) Jan Jenny-Starý	339
9	(Czech Republic) Vojtech Bradac	266
10	(Czech Republic) Frantisek Vesely	250

== Attendance records ==
Czech League			Czechoslovak League
Record	Season	Attendance	Record	Season
20,698	on 17 May 2008 against FK Jablonec (2007−08)	Home	42,000	on 9 April 1966 against Sparta Prague (1965−66)
44,120	on 2 October 1996 against FC Brno (1996−97)	Away	50,000	on 4 September 1965 against Sparta Prague (1965−66)
16,029	2019–20 (excludes matches with attendance limits due to COVID-19)	Season average

== Coach records ==
Czech League			Czechoslovak League
Record	Season	All time	Record	Season
3	Jindřich Trpišovský (from 2017–18 to 2020–21)	Most titles	4	J.W. Madden and Emil Seifert
8	Karel Jarolím (from 2000–01 to 2010–11)	Most seasons	10	Jaroslav Jareš (from 1972–73 to 1986–87)
181	Karel Jarolím (from 12 November 2001 to 24 September 2010)	Most appearances	260	Jaroslav Jareš (from 21 April 1973 to 31 October 1986)
101	Jindřich Trpišovský (From 17 February 2018, still continues as of 1 January 2022)	Most wins
53	Karel Jarolím	Most draws
36	Karel Jarolím	Most defeats
63y 1m 2d	František Cipro on 15 May 2010 against FK Mladá Boleslav	Oldest	58y 6m 13d	Bohumil Musil on 23 November 1980 against Inter Bratislava
36y 3m 9d	Martin Poustka on 11 March 2012 against FK Jablonec	Youngest	33y 3m 27d	Vlastimil Petržela on 16 November 1986 against Baník Ostrava
68	Jindřich Trpišovský (from 12 February 2018 to 6 December 2019)	Fewest matches to book 50 wins
135	Jindřich Trpišovský (from 12 February 2018 to 4 December 2021)	Fewest matches to book 100 wins

== Transfer records ==
Arrivals

Year	Pos	Player	From	Fee	Ref.	Matches pld
2019	AM	(Romania) Nicolae Stanciu	(Saudi Arabia) Al-Ahli	CZK 100 Million (€4.0M)		55
2018	LW	(Nigeria) Peter Olayinka	(Belgium) Gent	CZK 87 Million (€3.2M)		64
2018	RW	(Romania) Alexandru Băluță	(Romania) Universitatea Craiova	CZK 68 Million (€2.65M)		23
2021	RWB	(Denmark) Alexander Bah	(Denmark) SønderjyskE	CZK 44.2 Million (€1.7M)		12
2018	AM	(Czech Republic) Jan Matoušek	(Czech Republic) Příbram	CZK 40 Million (€1.55M)		7
2019	RWB	(Czech Republic) Tomáš Holeš	(Czech Republic) Jablonec	CZK 40 Million (€1.6M)		33

Departures

Year	Pos	Player	To	Fee	Ref.	Matches pld
2020	DM	(Czech Republic) Tomáš Souček	(England) West Ham	CZK 540 Million (€20.7M)		114
2019	DM	(Czech Republic) Alex Král	(Russia) Spartak	CZK 310 Million (€12.0M)		18
2021	RW	(Senegal) Abdallah Sima	(England) Brighton	CZK 250 Million (€10.0M)		24
2020	RWB	(Czech Republic) Vladimír Coufal	(England) West Ham	CZK 162.5 Million (€8.0M)		65
2021	CB	(Czech Republic) David Zima	(Italy) Torino	CZK 150 Million (€5.9M)		37

== Recent top goalscorers ==
Appearances include official and unofficial games.
Season	Player	Goals
2021–22	(Czech Republic) Ondřej Lingr	14
2020–21	(Czech Republic) Jan Kuchta	15
2019–20	(Czech Republic) Tomáš Souček	8
2018–19	(Czech Republic) Tomáš Souček	13
2017–18	(Czech Republic) Milan Škoda	11
2016–17	(Czech Republic) Milan Škoda	15
2015–16	(Czech Republic) Milan Škoda	14
2014–15	(Czech Republic) Milan Škoda	19
2013–14	(Czech Republic) Martin Juhar	6
2012–13	(Slovakia) Karol Kisel	8
2011–12	(Czech Republic) Zbyněk Pospěch	6
2010–11	(Slovakia) Karol Kisel	7
2010–11	(Czech Republic) Zbyněk Pospěch	7

== Top goalscorers ==
Season	Player	Goals
1896		
1897		
1898		
1899		
1900	(Kingdom of Bohemia) Karel Setzer-Bloomer	8
1901	(Kingdom of Bohemia) Jindřich Baumruk	7
1902	(Kingdom of Bohemia) Jindřich Baumruk	34
1903	(Kingdom of Bohemia) Jan Kosek	91
1904	(Kingdom of Bohemia) Jan Kosek	64
1905	(Kingdom of Bohemia) Jan Jenny-Starý	55
1906	(Kingdom of Bohemia) Jan Kosek	148
1907	(Kingdom of Bohemia) Josef Bělka	112
1908	(Kingdom of Bohemia) Jan Kosek	42
1909	(Kingdom of Bohemia) Jan Kosek	58
1910	(Kingdom of Bohemia) Jan Kosek	135
1911	(Kingdom of Bohemia) Jan Kosek	102
1912	(Kingdom of Bohemia) Jan Kosek	68
1913	(Kingdom of Bohemia) Josef Bělka	113
1914	(Kingdom of Bohemia)	
1915	(Kingdom of Bohemia)	
1916	(Kingdom of Bohemia)	
1917	(Kingdom of Bohemia) (Austria) (Czech Republic) Jan Vaník	36
1918	(Kingdom of Bohemia) (Austria) (Czech Republic) Jan Vaník	44
1919	(Kingdom of Bohemia) (Austria) (Czech Republic) Jan Vaník	36
1920	(Kingdom of Bohemia) (Austria) (Czech Republic) Jan Vaník	54
1921	(Kingdom of Bohemia) (Austria) (Czech Republic) Jan Vaník	36
1922	(Kingdom of Bohemia) (Austria) (Czech Republic) Jan Vaník	36
1923	(Czech Republic) Rudolf Sloup-Štapl	96
1924		
1925	(Kingdom of Bohemia) (Austria) (Czech Republic) Jan Vaník	28
