= 1903 SK Slavia Prague season =

Slavia Prague
1903 season
- Stadium: Letenská pláň
- Top goalscorer: League: Jan Košek (65); All: Jan Košek (91)

The 1903 season was SK Slavia Prague's 8th season. The team competed in Mistrovství Čech a Morav, but were categorised as a so-called "extra-class", higher than any other Czech team. They also competed in various international friendlies.

== Competitions ==
=== Matches ===
8 March 1903 1	Slavia Prague	9-0	SK Union
	Košek 20', 31', 40', 70'; Benda 2', 15', 85'; Vaněk 65'	Report

15 March 1903 2	Slavia Prague	3–1	Prague
	Benda 41'; Vaněk 70'; Jindrich Baumruk 89'	Report	Karel Setzer-Bloomer 46'

22 March 1903 3	Slavia Prague	7–0	Viktoria Cottbus
	Košek 46', 61', 71', 81'; Vaněk 33', 39'; Baumruk 89'	Report

25 March 1903 4	Slavia Prague	10-0	Deutscher Sport Club Prague
	Košek 34', 43', 48'; Baumruk 14', 89'; Vaněk 35', 76'; Antonin Pressler 58'; Benda 63'; Josef Hrabe 68'	Report

29 March 1903 5	Slavia Prague	4-2	CAFC Vinohrady
	Košek 83'; Vaněk 23'; Antonin Pressler 29'; Durdik 78'	Report

5 April 1903 6	Slavia Prague	2-4	Civil Service
	Košek 42'; Benda 70'	Report

13 April 1903 7	Slavia Prague	3–3	KB Copenhagen
	Benda 23'; Vaněk 26'	Report

22 April 1903 8	Slavia Prague	2–4	Southampton FC
	Košek 17'; Baumruk 83'	Report

26 April 1903 8	Slavia Prague	1–4	Southampton FC
	Jenny-Starý 12'	Report

10 May 1903 10	Slavia Prague	4–1	CAFC Vienna
	Košek 3', 40'; Benda 80'	Report

16 May 1903 11	Slavia Prague	4-0	RC Bruxelles
	Košek 85'; Karel Setzer-Bloomer 61'; Benda 79'	Report

17 May 1903 12	Slavia Prague	4-2	RC Bruxelles
	Košek 34'; Novotny 27'; Baumruk 40'; Benda 42'	Report

21 May 1903 13	Slavia Prague	9-1	Sport Favorit Prague
	Košek 23', 50', 62'; Vaněk 4', 13', 75'; Franta 8', 33'; Josef Hrabe 39'	Report

24 May 1903 14	Slavia Prague	8-2	First Vienna
	Košek 4', 23', 48', 53', 54', 58'; Vaněk 27'; Franta 57'	Report

31 May 1903 15	Slavia Prague	7–1	Budapest Postas
	Košek 38', 49', 57', 65', 88'; Benda 12', 27'	Report

1 June 1903 16	Slavia Prague	4-2	Budapest Postas
	Košek 81'; Benda 14', 43'; Baumruk (25)	Report

13 September 1903 17	Slavia Prague	10-1	Bonner FV
	Košek 12', 26', 41', 70'; Benda 9', 36', 66', 80', 88'; Karel Setzer-Bloomer 55'	Report

20 September 1903 18	Slavia Prague	20-0	Deutscher Sport Club
	Košek 3', 26', 32', 37', 43', 83'; Benda 16', 28', 80', 90'; Jenny-Starý 10', 12', 27'; Vaněk 25', 40', 54', 64'; Zacky 73'; Baumruk 89'	Report

28 September 1903 20	Slavia Prague	9-3	RC Bruxelles
	Košek 35', 41', 44', 52'; Baumruk 54', 84'; Pressler 68'; Benda 90'	Report

29 September 1903 19	Slavia Prague	8-1	RC Bruxelles
	Košek 23', 40', 42'; Baumruk 15', 21', 23'; Jenny-Starý (55)	Report

4 October 1903 21	Slavia Prague	14-3	Sport Favorit Prague
	Košek 20', 24', 26', 79', 83'; Vaněk 9', 14', 34', 86'; Benda 5', 38', 46', 47'; Jenny-Starý 59'	Report

12 October 1903 22	Slavia Prague	13-0	Graphia Vienna
	Košek 12', 21', 35', 51', 79'; Vaněk 19', 26', 33', 73'; Baumruk 6', 48'; Benda 62', 75'	Report

17 October 1903 23	Slavia Prague	7-9	KB Copenhagen
	Košek 81', 87'; Vaněk 17'; Benda 21'; Baumruk 26', 58', 71'	Report

18 October 1903 24	Slavia Prague	5-4	KB Copenhagen
	Košek 6', 60'; Benda 17', 45'; Setzer-Bloomer 55'	Report

25 October 1903 25	Slavia Prague	1-0	First Vienna
	Benda 19'	Report

1 November 1903 26	Slavia Prague	14-1	Rapid Vienna
	Košek 18', 22', 53', 63', 66', 79'; Benda 6'; Baumruk 24'; Pressler (25); Vaněk 44', 61'; Zacky 69'	Report

8 November 1903 27	Slavia Prague	12-0	Budapest Torna Club
	Košek 20', 26', 54', 69', 88'; Benda 8', 12', 43', 53'; Baumruk 65'; Setzer-Bloomer 82'	Report

15 November 1903 28	Slavia Prague	15-0	Berliner FV
	Košek 2', 20', 36', 44', 47', 55', 59', 80', 87', 89'; Benda 22', 30', 35'; Vaněk 58', 68'	Report

22 November 1903 29	Slavia Prague	12-0	Sport Favorit Prague
	Košek 35', 61', 64'; Tony 11', 39', 43'; Baumruk 48', 55', 72'; Vaněk 13', 31'; Benda 16'	Report

29 November 1903 30	Slavia Prague	10-1	Budapest Postás
	Košek 6', 54', 65'; Setzer-Bloomer 4', 49'; Hrabe 22'; Baumruk 42', 89'; Benda 61', 62'	Report

== Squad statistics ==
Pos.	Name	National Friendlies		International Friendlies		Total	
Pos.	Name	Apps	Goals	Apps	Goals	Apps	Goals
GK	(Kingdom of Bohemia) Jan Hejda	0	0	10+	0	10+	0
FB	(Kingdom of Bohemia) Richard Vesely						
FB	(Kingdom of Bohemia) Julius Vostaka						
HB	(Kingdom of Bohemia) Novy						
HB	(Kingdom of Bohemia) Karel Setzer-Bloomer	1	1	9	7	10	8
HB	(Kingdom of Bohemia) Zacky	2	0	2	1	4	1
FW	(Kingdom of Bohemia) Josef Hrabe	3	3	4	1	7	4
FW	(Kingdom of Bohemia) Zlutofial	1	0	0	0	1	0
HB	(Kingdom of Bohemia) Tony	1	3	0	0	1	3
FW	(Kingdom of Bohemia) Jirasek	1	0	0	0	1	0
FW	(Kingdom of Bohemia) Durdik	2	1	0	0	2	1
FW	(Kingdom of Bohemia) Novotny	0	0	1	1	1	1
FW	(Kingdom of Bohemia) Antonin Pressler	2	2	6	4	8	6
FW	(Kingdom of Bohemia) Franta	1	2	3	1	4	3
FW	(Kingdom of Bohemia) Trmal	1	0	2	2	3	2
FW	(Kingdom of Bohemia) Jindřich Baumruk	6	7	18	17	28	24
FW	(Kingdom of Bohemia) Josef Benda	6	13	18	30	24	43
FW	(Kingdom of Bohemia) Jan Košek	10	25	19	65	29	90
FW	(Kingdom of Bohemia) Miroslav Vaněk	8	17	13	14	21	31
FW	(Kingdom of Bohemia) Jan Jenny-Starý	2	4	3	2	5	6
FW	(Kingdom of Bohemia) Ctibor Malý	1	0	0	0	1	0
