= Ladislav Vaněk =

Czech footballer (1883–1960)

Personal information
- Date of birth: 20 June 1883
- Place of birth: Plzeň, Austria-Hungary
- Date of death: 20 March 1960 (aged 76)
- Place of death: Czechoslovakia
- Position: Forward

Senior career*
Years	Team	Apps	(Gls)
1902–1907	Slavia Prague		

International career
1906	Bohemia	1	(0)
- * Club domestic league appearances and goals

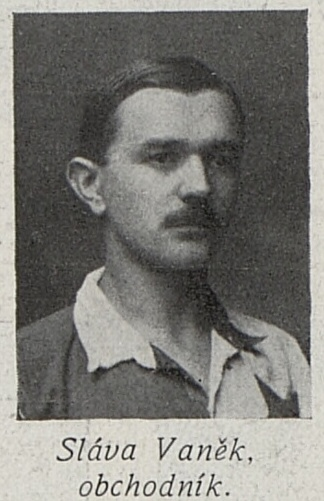

Ladislav "Sláva" Vaněk (20 June 1883 – 20 March 1960) was a Czech football player.

== Club career ==
Vaněk played his first game for Slavia Prague on 2 February 1902 in 8–5 victory over Slavia Prague's B-team. Vaněk tallied up his first assist for Slavia in this game, passing the ball to Jan Jenny-Starý for his second goal of the game. Vaněk's first game with a goal and an assist, was against BTC. He again assisted Jan Jenny-Starý and he scored the sixth goal after a battle with the keeper. Vaněk totalled 12 goals and 6 assists in his opening season at Slavia Prague, unfortunately losing out on the Challenge Cup to CAFC Vienna.

On 4 October of the following year, Vaněk scored 4 goals against Sport Favorite Prague, winning 14–3. 8 days later, he repeated this feat, scoring 4 again against Graphia Vienna, this time in a 13-0 dominating display. Despite scoring 31 goals and assisting on 15 occasions, he was still Slavia's 3rd top scorer that season. Jan Košek 91 and Josef Benda 43, were ahead of him.

1904 was like any other year for Slavia, winning against most teams they faced. The first continental team they faced was Union Berlin, beating them 13–2, with Vaněk scoring twice and assisting twice. In May, Vaněk got a goal and his first hat-trick of assists, when Slavia prevailed 16–1 over a weak Victoria Magdeburg side. He was once again prevalent in scoring and providing assists this year, scoring 19 and assisting another 15.

Due to no Jan Košek, Jindřich Baumruk and Rudolf Krummer, Vaněk's great performances were not on show as often as he would’ve hoped for. He only contributed 18 times to goals across the 1905 season, but he led in assists for Slavia Prague, with 12.

With the return of Jan Košek, Jindřich Baumruk and Rudolf Krummer, Vaněk once again showed that he was one of the best left-wingers on the continent. Slavia Prague played Victoria Magdeburg again, this time winning 14–3. Vaněk was arguably the best player on the field that day, despite Košek scoring 6. Vaněk himself scored a hat-trick and also assisted Košek and Josef Bělka. Even with a total of 24 goals and 15 assists for Vaněk, he was still 3rd on Slavia's goal contribution list. Jan Košek with 155 goal contributions and Jenny-Starý with 59, got in the way of Sláva Vaněk.

1907 was Vaněk's last season at Slavia Prague and with only 2 goals and 2 assists, it showed that his career intentions were elsewhere.

Throughout his time at Slavia Prague, Ladislav Vaněk played 203 games, scored 106 times and assisted 63 times.

== International career ==
Ladislav Vaněk only represented Bohemia on one occasion during his career. He starred in a 4–4 draw against Hungary, picking up an assist of Jan Jenny-Starý's goal.
