= Josef Čapek (footballer) =

Czech footballer and manager

Personal information
- Date of birth: 1 August 1902
- Place of birth: Prague, Austro-Hungary
- Date of death: 5 May 1983 (aged 80)
- Place of death: Prague, Czechoslovakia
- Position: Forward

Youth career
- 1914–1915: Viktoria Žižkov
- 1915–1919: Slavia Prague

Senior career*
Years	Team	Apps	(Gls)
1919	Slavia Prague	19	(5)
1920	Vojvodina		
1921–1927	Slavia Prague	129	(11)
1928–1931	Kladno	54	(12)

International career
1923–1926	Czechoslovakia	7	(8)

Managerial career
- 1941–1946: Polaban Nymburk
- * Club domestic league appearances and goals

Josef Čapek (1 August 1902 – 5 May 1983) was a Czech footballer who played for SK Slavia Prague, SK Kladno and the Czechoslovak national team.

== Club career ==
Born in Prague in 1902, he begin playing with Viktoria Žižkov in 1914 but in 1915 he joined the youth team of Slavia Prague. In 1920 Čapek had a short spell in the Kingdom of Serbs, Croats and Slovenes playing with SK Vojvodina, a club with traditional connection with Slavia Prague. He returned to Slavia and stayed until 1928, winning the first edition of the Czechoslovak First League with them in 1925.

In 1927 he moved to another Czechoslovak First League club, SK Kladno, where he played until 1931.

He later coached Polaban Nymburk between 1941 and 1946.

== International career ==
He represented the Czechoslovakia national team on seven occasions, scoring eight goals. His debut was on 1 July 1923, in a friendly match against Romania (a 6–0 win, with Čapek scoring twice) and his farewell match was on 28 October 1926 in a friendly match against Italy (a 3–1 win, with Čapek again scoring twice). He was member of the Czechoslovakia squad at the 1924 Olympics having played as number 10 in the first match against Turkey in a 5–2 win with him scoring the fifth goal, and in the second match against Switzerland, that ended with a 1–1 draw. Two days later a second match was played against Switzerland with Čapek being an unused substitute and ending with Czechoslovakia losing 0–1.

== Honours ==
Slavia Prague

- Czechoslovak First League: 1925
