= 1941–42 Národní liga =

Národní liga
- Season: 1941–42
- Champions: Slavia Prague
- Relegated: FC Viktoria Plzeň; Polaban Nymburk
- Top goalscorer: Josef Bican (45 goals)

The 1941–42 Národní liga (English: National league) was the third season of the Národní liga, the first tier of league football in the Nazi Germany-annexed Protectorate of Bohemia and Moravia which had been part of Czechoslovakia until March 1939.

The Czech championship was won by Slavia Prague, and Josef Bican was the league's top scorer with 45 goals.

Czech clubs in what was now the German-annexed Protectorate of Bohemia and Moravia continued their own league which was variously referred to as the Národní liga (English: National league), Bohemia/Moravia championship or Česko-moravská liga (English: Bohemian-Moravian league) while ethnic-German clubs played in the German Gauliga Sudetenland.

In the Slovak Republic an independent Slovak league, the Slovenská liga, had been established in 1939 and played out its own championship which was won by ŠK Bratislava in the 1941–42 season. A national Czechoslovak championship was not played between 1939 and 1945.

== Table ==
For the 1941–42 season SK Olomouc ASO and Polaban Nymburk had been newly promoted to the league.

Pos	Team	Pld	W	D	L	GF	GA	GR	Pts
1	Slavia Prague (C)	22	18	1	3	100	41	2.439	37
2	SK Prostějov	22	11	6	5	57	45	1.267	28
3	SK Plzeň	22	10	4	8	73	59	1.237	24
4	SK Pardubice	22	10	3	9	44	40	1.100	23
5	Bohemians Prague	22	9	4	9	74	69	1.072	22
6	Baťa Zlín	22	9	4	9	60	59	1.017	22
7	Sparta Prague	22	9	2	11	42	50	0.840	20
8	SK Židenice	22	8	3	11	63	70	0.900	19
9	SK Kladno	22	8	3	11	52	62	0.839	19
10	SK Olomouc ASO	22	8	3	11	52	63	0.825	19
11	Viktoria Plzeň (R)	22	7	4	11	43	56	0.768	18
12	Polaban Nymburk (R)	22	3	7	12	36	82	0.439	13

Source: rsssf.com
(C) Champions; (R) Relegated

== Results ==
Home \ Away	ZLÍ	BOH	NYM	KLA	OLO	PAR	SKP	PRO	ŽID	SLA	SPA	PLZ
Baťa Zlín		4–3	8–1	6–3	3–1	3–2	2–3	2–2	4–4	1–3	0–2	2–0
Bohemians Prague	4–5		2–2	9–2	7–3	3–2	3–6	3–3	3–3	2–5	2–1	7–0
Polaban Nymburk	4–3	2–6		5–4	2–0	0–2	1–3	3–3	2–4	1–7	1–1	2–2
SK Kladno	5–1	2–1	3–3		4–5	0–0	3–1	0–3	1–2	4–3	2–1	4–3
SK Olomouc ASO	3–3	4–4	2–0	3–3		5–1	2–1	3–4	4–2	1–4	3–1	2–1
SK Pardubice	2–1	2–3	5–0	2–1	2–1		7–2	1–0	2–1	3–3	2–0	3–0
SK Plzeň	6–2	3–4	2–2	1–5	8–2	2–2		6–1	6–2	6–1	1–1	5–1
SK Prostějov	1–0	4–0	1–1	4–1	1–0	3–2	5–1		6–3	1–4	3–0	3–3
SK Židenice	1–2	3–5	6–1	1–0	3–4	3–0	3–2	3–3		4–2	3–4	4–5
Slavia Prague	4–2	3–2	7–2	5–3	4–3	5–1	6–2	4–1	9–1		8–1	3–0
Sparta Prague	2–3	6–0	5–1	2–0	3–1	2–1	1–3	2–4	5–3	0–7		1–2
Viktoria Plzeň	3–3	4–1	5–0	1–2	2–0	2–0	3–3	3–1	3–6	0–3	0–1	

Source: statistiky1ligy.fotbal.cz
Legend: Blue = home team win; Yellow = draw; Red = away team win.
