= Vlastimil Kopecký =

Czech footballer (1912–1967)

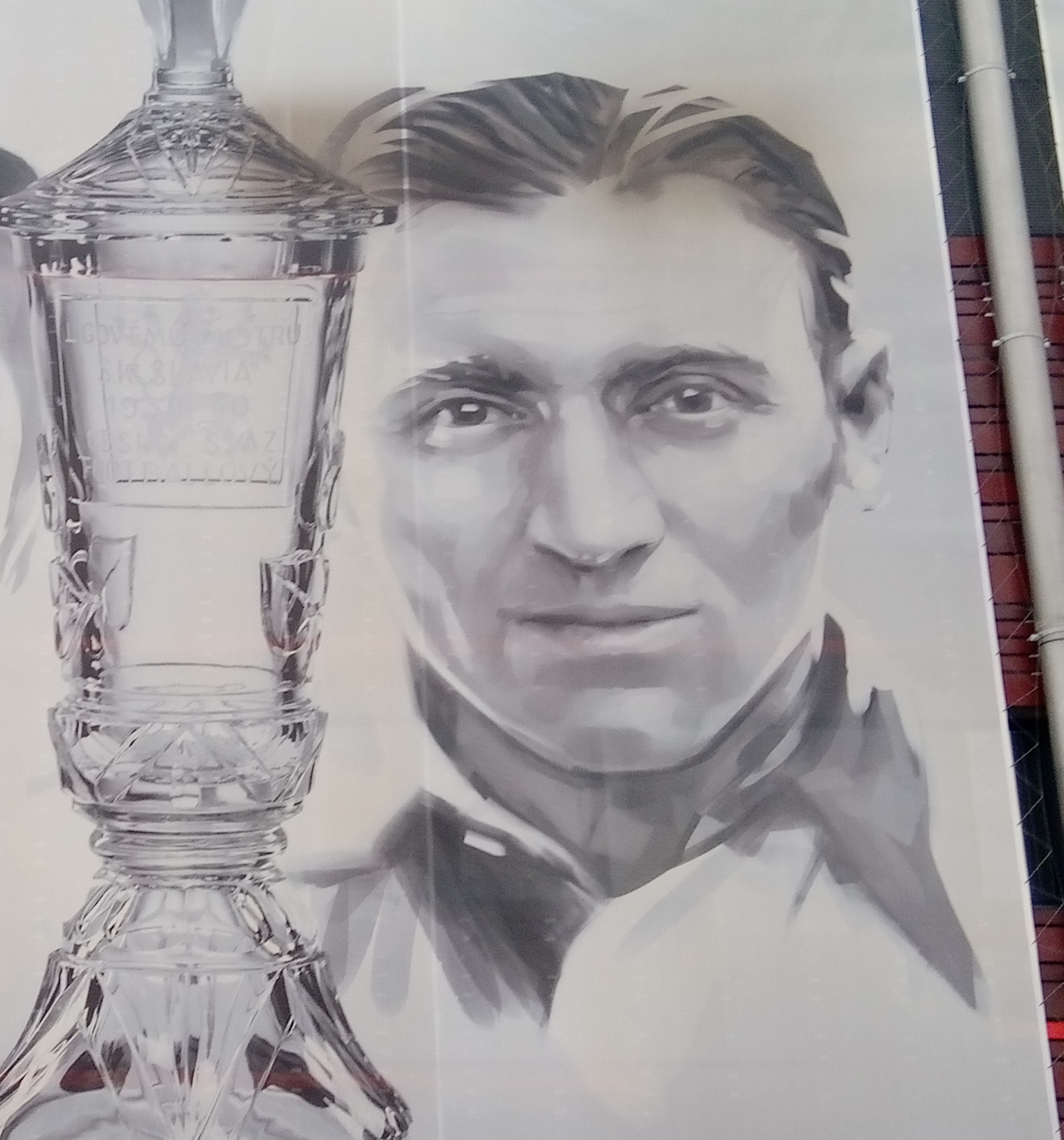

Personal information
- Date of birth: 14 October 1912
- Place of birth: Vilémov, Austrian-Hungarian Empire
- Date of death: 30 July 1967 (aged 54)
- Place of death: Hlinsko, Czechoslovakia
- Height: 1.67 m (5 ft 6 in)
- Position: Striker

Senior career*
Years	Team	Apps	(Gls)
1927–1932	Rapid Vinohrady	10	(13)
1932–1951	Slavia Prague	322	(255)
Total		332	(268)

International career
1932–1948	Czechoslovakia	26	(5)
1939	Bohemia	3	(3)

Managerial career
- 1959: Slavia Prague
Medal record
Representing Czechoslovakia
Men's Football
FIFA World Cup
Runner-up	1934 Italy
- * Club domestic league appearances and goals

Vlastimil Kopecký (14 October 1912 – 30 July 1967) was a Czech football player. He played 26 games for Czechoslovakia, scoring eight goals. He was a participant in the 1934 and 1938 FIFA World Cups.

== Club career ==
There were rumours that Kopecky was to transfer to Slavia Prague or Sparta Prague from Rapid Vinohrady in early November 1931. However in mid-November, Rapid announced that he was not to do so. Playing for Slavia Prague, he scored 252 league goals in 325 matches (1932-1950). He twice scored five goals in a single match for Slavia. He is the second highest Czech league goalscorer in history, only Josef Bican has scored more goals in the Czech league.

He suffered a heart attack on the pitch in a friendly match against SK Hlinsko Old Boys. Slavia Prague Old Boys won 4-2, but in the midst of the game, Kopecký collapsed to the floor and František Plánička tried to revive him. Kopecký was already gone, a second attempt to revive him at a polyclinic in Hlinsko, but again it was too late.

== Career statistics ==
Appearances and goals by club, season, and competition. Official games are included in this table.
Club	Season	Czech First League		Czech Cup (Note: Includes Bohemian Cup)		Mitropa Cup		Total	
Club	Season	Apps	Goals	Apps	Goals	Apps	Goals	Apps	Goals
Rapid Vinohrady	1930/1931	5	8	0	0	0	0	5	8
Rapid Vinohrady	1931/1932	0	0	1	3	0	0	1	3
Slavia Prague	1931–32	5	5	0	0	4	3	9	8
Slavia Prague	1932–33	18	20	2	3	2	2	22+	23+
Slavia Prague	1933–34	15	16	2	1	1	0	18	17
Slavia Prague	1934–35	16	11	0	0	5	3	21+	14+
Slavia Prague	1935–36	25	16	2+	4+	4	1	31+	21+
Slavia Prague	1936–37	21	28	2+	0+	2	0	25+	28+
Slavia Prague	1937–38	18	9	1	1	8	1	27	11
Slavia Prague	1938–39	21	20	0	0	2	0	23	24
Slavia Prague	1939–40	22	25	1+	1+	0	0	23+	26+
Slavia Prague	1940–41	20	21	9+	15+	0	0	29+	37+
Slavia Prague	1941–42	21	18	0	0	0	0	21	18+
Slavia Prague	1942–43	14	13	8+	13+	0	0	22+	26+
Slavia Prague	1943–44	24	20	1	0	0	0	24	20
Slavia Prague	1944–45	0	0	7	2	0	0	7	2
Slavia Prague	1945–46	16	10	3+	0+	0	0	19+	10+
Slavia Prague	1946–47	13	6	0	0	0	0	13	6
Slavia Prague	1947–48	9	2	1+	1+	0	0	9	2
Slavia Prague	1948	11	5	0	0	0	0	11	5
Slavia Prague	1949	21	5	0	0	0	0	21	5
Slavia Prague	1950	12	5	0	0	0	0	12	5
Slavia Prague	Total	327	263	40+	44+	28	10	395+	317+

== Style of play ==
Josef Bican commented on his and Vlastimil's relationship on the field; "We understood each other perfectly: we were, as it were, connected mentally. Whenever Vlasta had the ball at his feet, I felt what he was going to do with it, and he felt the same when I had the ball. It was simple and logical. I knew that he would handle the ball in the way that was most beneficial for the team at that moment, and I arranged accordingly. He was the best technician I ever met. We passed without even looking.

== Honours ==
- Czechoslovak First League: 1932–33, 1933–34, 1934–35, 1936–37, 1939–40, 1940–41, 1941–42, 1942–43, 1946–47, 1948
- Czechoslovak Cup: 1940–41, 1941–42, 1944–45
- Central Bohemian Cup: 1932, 1935, 1941, 1943, 1944
- Liberty Cup: 1945
- Mitropa Cup: 1938

=== Individual ===
- Best European wing-half: 1939 (selected by La Gazzetta dello Sport).
- Klub ligových kanonýrů: Member.
- Second-highest goalscorer in the history of the Czechoslovak and Czech First League: 255 goals.

=== Honours and recognition ===
- SK Slavia Prague Walk of Fame.
