= 1941–42 Slovenská liga =

Slovenská liga
- Season: 1941–42
- Champions: ŠK Bratislava
- Relegated: AC Spišská Nová Ves; ASO Bratislava

The 1941–42 Slovenská liga (English:Slovak league) was the fourth season of the Slovenská liga, the first tier of league football in the Slovak Republic, formerly part of Czechoslovakia until the German occupation of the country in March 1939.

In the Slovak Republic an independent Slovak league had been established in 1939 and played out its own championship which was won by ŠK Bratislava in 1941–42. In the German-annexed Protectorate of Bohemia and Moravia a separate league, the Národní liga (English:National league), was played and won by Slavia Prague in the 1941–42 season. A national Czechoslovak championship was not played between 1939 and 1945.

== Table ==
For the 1941–42 season Svit Batizovce and ASO Bratislava had been newly promoted to the league.

Pos	Team	Pld	W	D	L	GF	GA	GR	Pts
1	ŠK Bratislava (C)	22	13	5	4	82	35	2.343	31
2	FC Vrútky	22	13	3	6	62	42	1.476	29
3	MŠK Žilina	22	10	4	8	57	44	1.295	24
4	Svit Batizovce	22	9	6	7	49	40	1.225	24
5	Sparta Považská Bystrica	22	9	5	8	52	41	1.268	23
6	TTS Trenčín	22	9	5	8	44	51	0.863	23
7	TSS Trnava	22	9	4	9	47	48	0.979	22
8	VAS Bratislava	22	9	3	10	46	61	0.754	21
9	MFK Ružomberok	22	8	3	11	51	56	0.911	19
10	Slávia Prešov	22	7	5	10	50	58	0.862	19
11	Spišská Nová Ves (R)	22	5	5	12	28	62	0.452	15
12	ASO Bratislava (R)	22	5	4	13	39	69	0.565	14

(C) Champions; (R) Relegated
