= 1943–44 Národní liga =

Národní liga
- Season: 1943–44
- Champions: Sparta Prague
- Relegated: SK Olomouc ASO; SK Plzeň; SK Nusle
- Top goalscorer: Josef Bican (57 goals)

The 1943–44 Národní liga (English: National league) was the fifth season of the Národní liga, the first tier of league football in the Nazi Germany-annexed Protectorate of Bohemia and Moravia which had been part of Czechoslovakia until March 1939.

The Czech championship was won by Sparta Prague, and Josef Bican was the league's top scorer with 57 goals.

Czech clubs in what was now the German-annexed Protectorate of Bohemia and Moravia continued their own league which was variously referred to as the Národní liga (English: National league), Bohemia/Moravia championship or Česko-moravská liga (English: Bohemian-Moravian league) while ethnic-German clubs played in the German Gauliga Sudetenland and, from 1943 onward, also in the Gauliga Böhmen und Mähren.

In the Slovak Republic an independent Slovak league, the Slovenská liga, had been established in 1939 and played out its own championship which was won by ŠK Bratislava in the 1943–44 season. A national Czechoslovak championship was not played between 1939 and 1945.

== Table ==
For the 1943–44 season Polaban Nymburk, FK Viktoria Žižkov, Slezská Ostrava and SK Plzeň had been newly promoted to the league.

Pos	Team	Pld	W	D	L	GF	GA	GR	Pts
1	Sparta Prague (C)	26	22	4	0	109	26	4.192	48
2	Slavia Prague	26	22	1	3	131	43	3.047	45
3	Baťa Zlín	26	14	4	8	81	61	1.328	32
4	Viktoria Plzeň	26	12	5	9	65	58	1.121	29
5	Viktoria Žižkov	26	11	4	11	62	73	0.849	26
6	SK Kladno	26	11	3	12	52	64	0.813	25
7	Slezská Ostrava	26	12	1	13	60	80	0.750	25
8	SK Židenice	26	9	6	11	58	61	0.951	24
9	SK Pardubice	26	10	3	13	61	70	0.871	23
10	Bohemians Prague	26	9	3	14	70	63	1.111	21
11	Polaban Nymburk	26	8	4	14	55	72	0.764	20
12	SK Olomouc ASO (R)	26	9	2	15	47	75	0.627	20
13	SK Plzeň (R)	26	6	2	18	42	98	0.429	14
14	SK Nusle (R)	26	5	2	19	41	90	0.456	12

(C) Champions; (R) Relegated

== Results ==
Home \ Away	ZLÍ	BOH	NYM	KLA	NUS	OLO	PAR	SKP	ŽID	SLA	OST	SPA	PLZ	VŽI
Baťa Zlín		2–2	7–1	2–2	4–0	5–1	2–1	1–0	6–1	2–8	6–1	1–4	3–4	2–2
Bohemians Prague	1–8		0–1	5–1	1–2	5–4	1–1	2–4	3–6	2–6	10–1	2–2	1–2	6–0
Polaban Nymburk	2–2	3–2		8–0	4–0	2–3	6–2	1–3	1–1	2–5	3–0	2–2	3–5	3–1
SK Kladno	1–4	2–1	5–2		2–0	3–0	2–0	4–1	4–2	0–4	1–1	1–2	5–1	2–4
SK Nusle	1–4	3–9	1–1	1–0		1–3	5–1	0–2	0–4	3–5	2–0	0–6	3–4	5–3
SK Olomouc ASO	2–0	0–3	3–1	1–2	3–0		3–0	5–0	1–3	1–9	1–3	2–6	3–3	3–0
SK Pardubice	3–1	2–1	5–2	1–0	4–0	3–1		8–0	3–1	1–2	1–4	2–2	2–6	3–4
SK Plzeň	3–4	2–0	0–3	4–6	3–2	6–1	2–4		3–3	0–5	2–4	1–6	0–4	0–3
SK Židenice	6–2	2–3	4–0	3–3	2–0	1–1	3–2	4–1		1–1	0–4	1–2	2–1	2–4
Slavia Prague	2–4	4–2	9–0	5–2	7–4	5–2	9–2	12–2	4–1		8–2	0–1	5–0	4–1
Slezská Ostrava	4–6	2–1	3–1	1–2	6–1	3–0	3–2	2–0	2–1	3–6		1–5	4–2	2–5
Sparta Prague	6–0	2–1	3–1	2–1	6–2	6–0	6–0	10–1	4–3	3–1	6–0		7–1	8–2
Viktoria Plzeň	0–2	1–3	1–0	7–1	2–2	2–3	1–1	2–0	5–0	1–3	4–2	1–1		2–2
Viktoria Žižkov	3–1	0–3	5–2	2–0	4–3	3–0	3–7	2–2	1–1	1–2	7–3	0–4	0–3	

Legend: Blue = home team win; Yellow = draw; Red = away team win.
