= 1927 Czechoslovak First League =

Czechoslovak First League
- Season: 1927
- Champions: Sparta
- Relegated: Nuselský SK; SK Meteor Praha VIII
- Top goalscorer: Antonín Puč (13 goals)

Statistics of Czechoslovak First League in the 1927 season. Antonín Puč was the league's top scorers with 13 goals.

== Overview ==
It was contested by 9 teams, and Sparta Prague won the championship.

== League standings ==
Pos	Team	Pld	W	D	L	GF	GA	GD	Pts
1	Sparta Prague (C)	7	6	1	0	33	6	+27	13
2	Slavia Prague	7	5	1	1	30	12	+18	11
3	AFK Vršovice	7	3	2	2	14	15	−1	8
4	SK Kladno	7	3	1	3	18	26	−8	7
5	ČAFC Vinohrady	7	2	2	3	13	14	−1	6
6	Viktoria Žižkov	7	2	2	3	17	22	−5	6
7	Nuselský SK (R)	7	1	2	4	14	22	−8	4
8	Meteor Prague VIII (R)	7	0	1	6	9	31	−22	1

Source: rsssf.com
(C) Champions; (R) Relegated

== Results ==
Home \ Away	VRŠ	VIN	MET	NUS	KLA	SLA	SPA	VŽI
AFK Vršovice					2–1	2–7	2–2	2–1
ČAFC Vinohrady	1–1		4–0			1–4		
Meteor Prague VIII	1–4					1–6	0–4	
Nuselský SK	2–1	1–2	3–3					4–4
SK Kladno		4–4	4–3	3–0				2–1
Slavia Prague				2–1	8–3		0–1	3–3
Sparta Prague		2–1		7–3	8–1			
Viktoria Žižkov		2–1	6–1				0–9	

Source: statistiky1ligy.fotbal.cz
Legend: Blue = home team win; Yellow = draw; Red = away team win.
