= 1942–43 Slovenská liga =

Slovenská liga
- Season: 1942–43
- Champions: OAP Bratislava
- Relegated: AC Svit Batizovce; VAS Bratislava (sk)

The 1942–43 Slovenská liga (English:Slovak league) was the fifth season of the Slovenská liga, the first tier of league football in the Slovak Republic, formerly part of Czechoslovakia until the German occupation of the country in March 1939.

In the Slovak Republic an independent Slovak league had been established in 1939 and played out its own championship which was won by OAP Bratislava in 1942–43. In the German-annexed Protectorate of Bohemia and Moravia a separate league, the Národní liga (English:National league), was played and won by Slavia Prague in the 1942–43 season. A national Czechoslovak championship was not played between 1939 and 1945.

== Table ==
For the 1942–43 season OAP Bratislava and HG Šimonovany had been newly promoted to the league.

Pos	Team	Pld	W	D	L	GF	GA	GR	Pts
1	OAP Bratislava (C)	22	17	3	2	91	26	3.500	37
2	ŠK Bratislava	22	14	2	6	72	33	2.182	30
3	Sparta Považská Bystrica	22	11	4	7	65	51	1.275	26
4	HG Šimonovany	22	11	2	9	61	54	1.130	24
5	TSS Trnava	22	11	0	11	56	63	0.889	22
6	FC Vrútky	22	9	3	10	49	56	0.875	21
7	MFK Ružomberok	22	9	2	11	36	54	0.667	20
8	Slávia Prešov	22	8	3	11	50	53	0.943	19
9	MŠK Žilina	22	9	1	12	45	55	0.818	19
10	TTS Trenčín	22	8	3	11	48	67	0.716	19
11	Svit Batizovce (R)	22	6	6	10	41	56	0.732	18
12	VAS Bratislava (R)	22	3	3	16	37	83	0.446	9

(C) Champions; (R) Relegated
