= 1925–26 Czechoslovak First League =

Czechoslovak First League
- Season: 1925–26
- Dates: 15 August 1925 – 25 July 1926
- Champions: Sparta
- Relegated: Čechie Karlín; SK Libeň; SK Slavoj Žižkov; SK Čechie VIII
- Top goalscorer: Jan Dvořáček (32 goals)

Statistics of Czechoslovak First League in the 1925–26 season.

== Overview ==
It was contested by 12 teams, and Sparta Prague won the championship. Jan Dvořáček was the league's top scorer with 32 goals.

== Team changes ==
DFC Prag withdrew from the league before the start of the season. The other nine teams from the previous season were joined by SK Kladno, Slavoj Žižkov and SK Čechie VIII, as the league expanded to 12 teams.

== League standings ==
Pos	Team	Pld	W	D	L	GF	GA	GR	Pts
1	Sparta Prague (C)	22	18	3	1	97	24	4.042	39
2	Slavia Prague	22	18	2	2	112	25	4.480	38
3	Viktoria Žižkov	22	16	3	3	91	31	2.935	35
4	Nuselský SK	22	12	3	7	61	49	1.245	27
5	ČAFC Vinohrady	22	11	3	8	52	52	1.000	25
6	AFK Vršovice	22	9	5	8	57	42	1.357	23
7	Meteor Prague VIII	22	10	2	10	65	76	0.855	22
8	SK Kladno	22	9	2	11	63	67	0.940	20
9	Čechie Karlín (R)	22	6	2	14	58	78	0.744	14
10	SK Libeň (R)	22	5	2	15	40	92	0.435	12
11	Slavoj Žižkov (R)	22	2	1	19	28	89	0.315	5
12	SK Čechie VIII (R)	22	1	2	19	23	122	0.189	4

Source: rsssf.com
(C) Champions; (R) Relegated

== Results ==
Home \ Away	VRŠ	VIN	KAR	MET	NUS	ČEC	KLA	LIB	SLA	SŽI	SPA	VŽI
AFK Vršovice		0–4	2–2	3–3	2–3	4–1	4–6	6–1	0–3	2–1	2–3	1–1
ČAFC Vinohrady	0–3		2–1	3–1	4–2	7–2	2–1	2–2	1–4	6–3	1–6	1–8
Čechie Karlín	5–4	1–7		1–2	2–4	10–0	3–6	6–2	0–6	3–0	3–3	1–3
Meteor Prague VIII	2–8	3–4	6–3		3–1	8–3	4–3	3–0	1–7	9–1	1–1	0–7
Nuselský SK	1–1	2–1	2–1	5–3		1–0	6–2	5–2	0–6	4–0	0–3	0–2
SK Čechie VIII	0–5	0–0	3–4	5–4	1–9		0–4	2–5	0–11	1–1	2–8	0–8
SK Kladno	1–1	1–1	4–3	1–3	2–1	7–0		9–1	0–6	4–1	1–5	1–4
SK Libeň	0–2	1–2	6–2	2–3	2–2	2–0	3–1		1–5	0–6	1–10	2–4
Slavia Prague	1–2	4–1	8–1	6–2	5–2	9–1	3–1	7–3		6–0	3–1	2–2
Slavoj Žižkov	0–3 (Note: The matches of Slavoj Žižkov against AFK Vršovice and Čechie Karlín were each rated 0–3. The reason was the use of an ineligible player.)	2–3	0–3	2–3	2–5	3–0	1–5	2–3	1–6		0–8	1–7
Sparta Prague	2–1	2–0	3–1	7–1	2–2	4–0	6–2	6–0	3–2	6–0		3–0
Viktoria Žižkov	2–1	3–0	5–2	3–0	3–4	8–2	9–1	7–1	2–2	2–1	1–5	

Source: statistiky1ligy.fotbal.cz
Legend: Blue = home team win; Yellow = draw; Red = away team win.
