= Antonín Rýgr =

Czech footballer and manager

Personal information
- Date of birth: 15 August 1921
- Place of birth: Kročehlavy, Czechoslovakia
- Date of death: 28 March 1989 (aged 67)
- Place of death: Czechoslovakia
- Position: Striker

Youth career
- 1938–1940: Admira VIII

Senior career*
Years	Team	Apps	(Gls)
1941–1942	SK Kladno		
1942–1943	ASO Olomouc		
1943–1948	SK Kladno		
1949	Admira VIII		
1950–1954	Sparta Prague		

International career
1948	Czechoslovakia	2	(0)

Managerial career
- 1954–1957: Czechoslovakia
- 1956–1958: Slavia Prague
- 1959: Slavia Prague
- 1960–1963: Slavia Prague
- 1966–1970: FK Teplice
- 1970: Czechoslovakia
- 1970–1972: Slavia Prague
- 1973–1977: FK Teplice
- 1978: Sparta Prague
- * Club domestic league appearances and goals

Antonín Rýgr (15 August 1921 – 28 March 1989) was a Czech football manager and former player.

As a player, Rýgr played mostly from SK Kladno before joining Sparta Prague in 1950. In 1952 and 1954 he won the Czechoslovak First League with Sparta. Rýgr also appeared in two matches of the national team in 1948.

After finishing his active career, Rýgr started to work as a football manager. He coached both famous Prague clubs, Slavia Prague and Sparta Prague. He also coached FK Teplice and Czechoslovakia national football team.
