= Jan Košek =

Czech footballer (1884–1927)

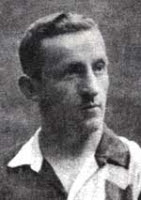

Personal information
- Date of birth: 28 July 1884
- Place of birth: Turnov, Bohemia, Austria-Hungary
- Date of death: 30 December 1927 (aged 43)
- Place of death: Czechoslovakia
- Position: Forward

Youth career
- Academic Gymnasium Prague
- 1899–1902: Letenský kroužek
- 1902–1903: Union Letná

Senior career*
Years	Team	Apps	(Gls)
1902–1903	Union Letná		
1903–1904	Slavia Prague		
1904–1905	Sparta Prague		
1905–1914	Slavia Prague		

International career
1903–1911	Bohemia	9	(14)
- * Club domestic league appearances and goals

Jan Košek (28 July 1884 – 30 December 1927) was a Czech footballer who played as a striker. He scored 819 unofficial goals in 302 games for Slavia Prague and won three consecutive Charity Cups. Additionally he won a Silver Cup and the European Amateur Championship.

== Early life ==
Jan Košek was born on 28 July 1884 in Turnov. His father was Jan Baptista Košek and his mother was Františka Košek, originally Peldová. They raised five children, and only Jan lived to adulthood. Jan had three sisters and a brother and the family owned two houses, numbers 31 and 40 on Hrustická street. He spent his childhood in Turnov, where he attended his local school. In the middle of 1895, his father came to the decision to move to Prague, where Jan went to study.

The first match that was ever recorded, that Jan played in, was in 1900 for Letenský kroužek. The score ended 5–4 to Letenský kroužek and Košek scored 3 of the 5. For the first few years of his life in Prague, Košek played for Academic Gymnasium Prague, Letenský kroužek and Union Letná.

== Club career ==
=== Emerging talent ===
Košek started his career and Union Letna where he played 4 games and scored 4 goals. He played against Slavia Prague in two of those matches, scoring in one of them.

On 22 February 1903, Košek made his debut as an 18-year-old, in the red and white colours of Slavia Prague, in a 9–1 win vs CAFC Vinohrady. Journalists praised him, fans raised eyebrows and his goals convinced everyone. On 1 April 1903, Slavia Prague acquired the pupil of the Academic Gymnasium Jan Košek and publicly admitted that the transfer took place (for the first time in our football history) for money. She paid the membership fees to the current SK Union club, paid for club membership in our club and gave the student "the necessary financial support". During this time, Košek was still studying at the academic gymnasium and had to hide from the school authorities in newspaper reports and in photographs. Košek's first known hat-trick for Slavia was against his former club, Union Letna. His first goal came in the 20th minute and his third came in the 40th. He scored one final goal in the 70th minute. During a game against First Vienna, Slavia scored 5 goals in the space of 13 minutes, Košek himself, scored 4 goals in 10 minutes. His most goals in one game, came against Berliner FV. He scored 10 goals in 15–0 victory, scoring 3 goals in the final 10 minutes of the game. In his first season with Slavia he scored 65 goals, in international friendlies and 91 goals overall, as a 19 year old.

On 2 April 1904, SK Slavia defeated London's Civil Service FC 6–3. A day later then 3:2. Slavia Prague's line-up: Jan Hejda – Páclt, Ferdinand Veselý, Nový, Hrabě, Strádal, Jindřich Baumruk, Josef Benda, Jan Jenny-Starý, Jan Košek and Slava Vaněk. Karel Setzer-Bloomer played in the second match. Košek scored four goals, Josef Benda scored three and Hrabě and Jan Jenny-Starý scored one. By February 1904, an Austrian newspaper stated, "Košek has developed in such a way, in recent games, that he should probably counted amongst the best strikers on the continent", despite being only 20 years old. During this year, Kosek scored at least 64 goals for Slavia alone.

=== Transfer to Sparta ===
In November 1904 he transferred to Sparta Prague and played a year there with fellow Slavia Prague teammates, Jindřich Baumruk and Rudolf Krummer. In the same year, both his parents and his sister died. His debut game, Kosek put 6 past SK Smichov in a 12–2 victory. On 25 December 1904, Sparta played against First Vienna and won 7–2. Košek scored 7 goals. The next day, a game against Wiener AC, which ended 3–3. Košek scored 3 goals and the referee was Hugo Meisl. During his time at Sparta Jan played more than 25 games and scored more than 75 goals.

=== Goalscoring talent shows ===
In 1905 he returned to Slavia Prague and met his new coach Johnny Madden. The way Slavia Prague trained changed massively, it became more expertly done and more modern. At this point in his career for Slavia Prague, he scored 178 goals. Jan was highly coveted by Vienna Cricket and Football Club and by Rangers.

1906 was a great year for him and Slavia Prague. During this year, Slavia Prague played 48 matches and won 39 times, with a goals scored to goals conceded ratio of 340:62. He at least scored 148 goals for Slavia Prague this season in 43 games. On 24 March Slavia Prague played a match against Budapesti Postás SE, in which Jan scored 4 goals. Košek had an explosive, violent temperament, a character that had the same trait in play as inaction. It was during this match in Pest on the MAC field. One of the Hungarian players knocked down Vaňek brutally. When treating him, a group Hungarian players are standing about 20 meters from us, surrounding Vaňek. Košek, seeing his injured friend, takes a look at the player who attacked Vaňek. The ball lied about a meter from his feet. Indignantly, he kicks him into the group of Pest players. His hard shot finds the culprit, Fekete, who goes down and is carried off the pitch. Everyone is surprised, nowhere is there a voice of resistance, rather muttering over the certainty with which Košek hit the culprit. From the 17 March 1906 to 19 May 1906, Kosek played 13 games and scored a hat-trick in each one. He totalled 31 hat-tricks that year and 62 goals across those 13 games, at an average of 4.76. On 25 February 1906, Slavia Prague beat Germania Schwechater 16–0. Jan scored 6 goals, including one with his hand, but the referee did not see this and gave the goal. On 10 October he scored his 300th goal for Slavia Prague in a 7–2 win against BTC.

In 1907, Slavia Prague continued to play a vast number of international friendly matches. Most of these matches were played against teams from neighbouring countries. Also this year, Slavia Prague won their biggest ever derby in a 9–1 thumping of Sparta Prague. Košek scored twice in this match. Jan scored 77 goals in 31 games for Slavia Prague this season, second behind Josef Bělka with 109 in 38. On 10 November, Košek scored 6 goals in an 8–1 victory against SK Smíchov, making this his 399th goal for Slavia in only 130 matches.

=== Charity Cup triumphs ===
In 1908, Slavia Prague B won the Charity Cup, with Košek scoring more than 45 goals. Kosek scored 5 against SK Vinohrady on 23 February 1908. A game later, he replicated his feat and scored another 5 against SK Smichov. Košek could have made a move to Newcastle United after an offer was made.

In 1909, Slavia Prague only played a total of 40 matches, Jan scored 58 goals. In a game against SK Smíchov, in May, the Narodni Listy journalist describes one of Košek's goals; "The goalkeeper flies towards him, they both collide with each other, but Košek, with a coolness reminiscent of similar masterful feats by Bloomer, he kicked the ball into the net."

In 1910 Slavia Prague played 21 matches and did not lose a single one. Jan picked up 135 goals. These matches were played against amateur teams from England. Slavia Prague managed to win a second Charity Cup. In the semi-final Slavia Prague beat Sparta Prague 5–1 and in the final Slavia Prague won 5–2 against CFK Smíchov Praha. In both of these games Košek scored a goal. During this season Košek played his 200th match for Slavia Prague, before this games he had scored 576 goals in 199 games. By October Košek had scored 600 goals in his career, scoring 2 in a 5–0 victory over Old Grammarians

1911 was one of the best years for Košek, as he scored over 102 goals. In a game against Aberdeen, the score was 2–2 and in the 82nd minute, Košek took the ball on the half turn and rifled it into the net from 30 meters. This goal was called, by many, the best of his 819. This year he also won an additional Charity Cup and at this point in his career, he totalled 700 goals for Slavia. In the sports section of a Narodni listy paper, the author wrote "Shall we see if Košek gets his 1000th goal", predicting that Košek will score 1000 goals in the future. He eventually achieved this feat, but unfortunately not for Slavia Prague. In addition, Košek was elected captain of Slavia Prague on 7 January.

=== Final years ===
1912 was another great year for Košek, he notched up 68 goals. For the third time in a row, Slavia Prague won the Charity Cup, in a 4–3 victory against FK Viktoria Žižkov. On 26 March 1912, the Slavia footballers won over the team of English students at the University of London 6–1. The day before, on 25 March, they won 5–0. In these matches, Košek scored 6 goals, Šroubek and Jaroslav Bohata after two goals, Široký scored one, this total is for both games together. In addition to the shooters, Romováček's goalkeepers were also on the field in both matches, and Pimmer caught the next day. Rudolf Krummer, Richard Veselý and Hajný played in the defence, Emmanuel Benda, Majzl, G. Macoun and Holý were in the middle and Medek the attacker. By the end of 1912, Kosek had scored 803 goals in 295 games for Slavia Prague.

1913 marked Jan Košek's final full year as a Slavia Prague player. On 29 March, he announced his retirement from football at the age of just 29. Contemporary reports noted his importance to SK Slavia, highlighting his individual runs and long-range shooting. After retiring from regular play, he joined the club's Old Boys side. Slavia's committee also expected him to remain involved with the club in an administrative capacity, citing his experience as a player.

1914 sparked a change of decision from Košek, as he agreed to play several games for Slavia Prague, due to lack of players. During this year he played a total of 6 games and scored 8 goals. In his final recorded game for Slavia's first-team, Kosek scored 2 goals and registered an assist, in a 7–0 victory over First Vienna.

== International career ==
Jan Košek would regularly play for Bohemia and Moravia as well as the Prague national team. In 1903 he defended the colours of the national team of Prague in a game against Budapest, which Prague lost 2–1.

Many of his games for Prague are not classified in his official statistics. The Bohemia and Moravia played several matches under the regulations of FIFA from 1906 to 1908. Košek took part in three of them and scored four goals. On 7 October 1906 Bohemia and Moravia drew 4–4 with Hungary and Košek scored a goal in the 88th minute to set the final score. Kosek 2, Baumruk scored 1 and Jan Jenny-Stary scored the other, however, other sources claim that Košek scored 2 and so did Jenny Stary. The next year they met again in a friendly, Bohemia and Moravia won 5–3 and Košek scored a hat-trick and Josef Bělka scored the other two. But again another source claims that Košek scored 4 and Josef only got one.

In 1908, FIFA did not allow Bohemia and Moravia to take part in the 1908 London Olympics.

In September and October 1909, the Bohemia and Moravia team went on a tour to England and France, playing 6 games against England FA, Eastern Counties, Lille, among others. Košek scored at least 11 goals, including a five-goal haul against Lille.

In 1911, Košek helped the Bohemian team win the European Amateur Football Championship in Roubaix. On 25 May, on their way to the tournament, they played a warm-up match against a team from Brussels, in which Košek scored two goals in a 6–1 win. Upon announcing the squads to face each other, in the Bohemia–Brussels match, the author of Le Soir said this about Košek: "Jan Kosek, captain of Slavia, the most famous left-forward on the continent. He's played 250 matches for Slavia and scored more than 600 goals. He is the terror of goalkeepers". Two days later, on 27 May, Košek scored once to help Bohemia to a 4–1 win over France in the semifinals. In the final of the UIAFA European tournament, Košek scored a second-half equalizer in an eventual 2–1 win over England AFA (although French newspaper reports that Josef Bělka scored both Bohemian goals), thus contributing decisively in helping Bohemia win the title.

== Style of play ==
Košek was a very strong and fast athlete, clocking 100m in 11 seconds. He had such a powerful left-foot which allowed him to score many longshots. Due to his high speed, he always played on the final man on the attack and was able to spin away from the defender with ease. He would complete the attack from any position on the pitch.

Wilhelm Cepurski, former Wisła Kraków player, once said about Jan: "Košek, yes, the leading forward of Slavia. I had the pleasure to tackle him in the match. The peasant was bulky, his legs like telegraph poles. Taking advantage of the fact that the ball was wet, heavy and slippery, he often hit from a distance, and our poor goalkeeper did not have the strength to stop such shots and the result 10–3 to Slavia Prague."

In 1905, Košek played for Sparta in 2–3 loss to Ferencváros and despite being on the losing side, "performed at an outstanding class". When playing for Sparta, Košek represented Prague against Budapest, an author of Nemzeti Sport commented: "the Czechs' high scoring ability was only due to Kosek's magnificent play and the team's greater training." Another author, this time of Sport-Vílág stated: "The main strength of the Czech team lies within the attack, in which Sharp (Kosek), the continent's best player, plays. This time, however, Kosek did not play for himself, but for the team, and with the help of his talented forward teammates, he won the game for his team."

Mr. Jenšík and Mr. Macků write in the Chronicle of Czech Football: "Jindřich Baumruk just lifts his leg, he magically catches the ball on the tip of his foot and turns as if on a spinning wheel and already kicks it down the line. He centers beautifully, Košek stands like a pillar of salt, waiting. However, in this he starts out like the king of animals with a mane. Three or four jumps. Then he swings his powerful leg towards the ball. It flapped like a wet banner in the wind. A cannon firecracker. The low-flying ball whistles like an arrow from a distance of some thirty-five meters from the opponents goal. The goalkeeper just turns his head and shakes a little. But the ball is already rippling in the net. A wonderful goal!"

Ferdinand Scheinost, journalist and writer, considered Jan Košek the greatest football personality he had seen and experienced. In the same book, he says about him: "I have traveled the world and seen hundreds of the best players of all nations play, including English professionals. However, I have never seen a shooter who could bear the comparison with Jenda Košek. What Enrico Caruso was as a tenor, Košek meant as a shooter. It was a whirlwind when Václav Pilát went out into the deserted wing. But Košek – that was lightning, it just flashed as he sprinted, it was as if the others stood still. And it was beneath his dignity to run to the goal. From a large distance, he had shot the ball that could not be caught. He could only be challenged if two players behind him were guarding him."

Košek was considered one of the most brilliant phenomena in the pre-war years of Czech football; he was well known across Europe during the height of his career. As a striker, Košek excelled with great speed and shooting skills.

An author of, Večerní České slovo, wrote; "Today we buried a friend, a rare athlete, the type we wish we could generalize in our sport. He was a boy who knew how to win. Slavia had more of them in the history of their football teams; I randomly remember only Baumruk, Setzer-Bloomer, Jul.Kosátku, Karel Kryž, Kindle, Maizlo, but Košek stood above all the exuberance. He was a tough player who was never afraid of anyone, anywhere. He didn't care who he was playing against. Košek and Baumruk set off like predators after starting. Their fighting slogan was stated: "Guys, let's go". These two did not capitulate to any defense, even if they were from England or Scotland, The English were often scared when Košek went forward with the ball. Košek was a boy who knew how to win, no one had his quickness. His speed and shot gave him the opportunity to surprise, he was a great type of kick and rush player. If he was in the same line as the defender, he was a meter ahead of him in a fraction of a second, and in a second his predatory start had rid of every opponent. With a rapid run, he approached the goal to within 15 meters and here he had already started to shoot. The flicker of which the goalkeeper could barely notice. His shots directly from the air must have disturbed the calm of any goalkeeper.

His style was captivating, kick and rush in full perfection. He did not like unnecessary combination, it simply delayed him from doing what he does best. He fully understood that the purpose of the match was a goal, and none of our players heard the cheers of thousands as many times as the late Košek, when he scored a lucky shot. When an opponent explained to him that he had no sense of combination, Baumruk always took him up on it and declared: "Košek was the ideal of the youth, in the stands, who would watch with devouring with eyes. He was sure of himself and when he had the ball, every spectator had a sense of joyous satisfaction and excitement, knowing that the decision would soon be made when he scored a goal. He excelled in brevity in the game, a short sharp run and a shot. Journalists knew that Košek, who came to Slavia from the SK Union in the spring of 1903, is at least fifty percent the mastermind behind all the inexplicable phenomena that take place wherever Slavia plays.First, however, we must say that Kocián was one of Koška's numerous pseudonyms.

== Legacy ==
Statisticians have claimed he scored over 800 times in his career, with the figures 804 or 819 coming up the most frequently.Some sources even say he scored more than 1000 goals. These 3 numbers are due to the uncertainty of the goals Jan scored for Slavia. A Sport a hry newspaper was published and stated: "As of 16 January 1914, Slavia has scored 3829 goals since the creation of the club. Jan Košek scored the most with 804 goals." More recently, statisticians have expanded the tally to 819 goals because goals from the years 1913 and 1914 were not included in the 804 tally. In 1989, a book called Belfast Celtic was published by John Kennedy. The author wrote about Belfast Celtic's trip to Bohemia in 1912, "Then there was the prolific inside-left by the name of "Kojak" who was reputed to have scored 800 goals in just 5 seasons".

The uncertainty of Košek's goals relies on many factors. Slavia archivists within the Slavia Museum commented: "The archive documenting all matches and goals of Jan Košek was burned as well as the Slavia in Letná. This was caused by the Wehrmacht on the 6 May 1945 during the Prague uprising, so a detailed inventory of his goals are not available." A year later, Václav Valoušek collected as much information as possible that still remained, and as a player in the period 1903 – 1914, he played 302 official matches for Slavia and was the scorer of 819 official goals. Košek was appointed as Slavia's sports director on 1 January 1913, he played 27 unofficial charity matches until 1919 for Old Boys Slavia. However, the number of goals in those matches was not recorded, only the results of the matches with the number of spectators and the financial proceeds donated to charity funds. Since 1946, Slavia tried many times on Jan Košek to restore the complete records, but in vain. This is due to, during the entire era of Košek's playing career, there was not a single Czech newspaper that had its own sports section and there was no Czech press office either. In 1981, the SK Slavia Prague football management prepared the SK Slavia Prague Football Almanac from the available sources and ended further research against the sources that had been searched in vain so far. The basis of Košek's statistics were determined. At that time, future statistics published after this year are continued without changes to the original statistics. In 2023, an English man single-handedly collected game by game data on Jan Košek from Sport a Hry and Národní listy and in turn discovered at least 18 games for the Slavia Prague Old Boys in which Košek scored more than 49 goals.

But what we do know for certain is that Košek scored a total of 819 goals for Slavia Prague, only second to Josef Bican with 1137 goals. As part of Slavia Prague 125th anniversary Jan was announced as one of the players in a "Historic Eleven" voted by the fans.

In the book: Pět tisíc gólů by Josef Pondelik, Pondelik describes and compares Jan Košek's and Josef Bican's opinion from the fans, mentioning; that only eighty percent of fans enjoy Jan Košek's heroic style of football all those years ago, whereas one hundred percent of fans admire Josef Bican's game.

At the time of Košek's death, Dr Emile Sanek sums up Jan's career as a whole; "Košek was considered everywhere as the best player in the world and he refused several offers from across the Channel. With Košek, disappears a player whose class had never been reached so far in Czechoslovakia, even by Pešek, Pilát, Kolenatý and Plánička, the stars of today.

G. O. Smith mentions: "Hejda was good in goal, Jindřich Baumruk on the wing literally ran past our defender, but the best of all is Košek. He would certainly be in competition with our first class professionals if he thought more about the interplay. I believe that he wasn't combining at all, he is returning too much."

The same author in, Večerní České slovo, wrote: "Boy who can do it! Yesterday, we are the ones who came to show him his last honor, it was the best proof of Košek's popularity despite the fact that this perfect athlete stopped exciting the masses with his game some time ago. He would like the mass football youth to have his love and passion for the sport, to be unafraid of fighting, to always be the brave heart of Košek in the game, to be manly, unyielding, tough and honest in training and in matches. Košek is a desirable type of sportsman for us, in his time you could not hear shouts: "Play, play!" with moments of struggle, persistent hard fighting until exhaustion. He was a great player, a whole man. the memories of his glory as a player and as an athlete, may those who knew him awaken in today's football generation a living desire for such perfection as was achieved by this son of poor parents, who, with his skill, did a lot of work for his little one nation. That will be the best, more beautiful tribute to his memory."

In the Večerní České slovo, an author states his best combined team in Czech history and best 11 players in Czech history: "If only we could build, the strongest line-up of Czechoslovakia would look like this: Plánička, Pospíšil, Hojer A, Kolenatý, Káďa, Pemer, Baumruk, Svoboda, Pilát, Košek, Mazal. The eleven best footballers of the entire Czechoslovak football history: Plánička, Košek, Pilát, Mazal, Vaněk, Mycík, Káďa, Kolenaty, Baumruk, Prokop, Janda."

Jan Košek is widely regarded as one of the most outstanding forwards in the early history of Czech football. A prolific goalscorer for Slavia Prague, he was considered by many contemporaries to be the finest attacker in the country during the peak of his career. His performances helped establish Slavia's reputation in domestic and international football before WWI. Košek remains a significant figure in the development of Czech football, and his contributions are widespread and well known.

An author, of Československá republika, wrote: "Jan Košek, the most popular Czechoslovak footballer, the famous striker of the pre-war era of Czech Republic football, passed away on December 30 after a long, drawn-out illness. Košek was one of the most brilliant phenomena of Czech football and during pre-war years and there were times when his name was popular throughout European football. As a striker, he excelled with great speed and shooting skills, his shots were unstoppable. At the same time, Košek was very popular in the circles of his friends, of which he naturally had many, due to his kind nature. Košek's name will always live on in the history of Czech football. It is less known now that Košek was excellent an athlete. He defeated all his rivals and won the Hungarian championship in Budapest in a time that only world-class athletes could achieve at the time."

== Athletics ==
In 1905, Košek took part in an athletics competition. He ran;

- 60 meters in 7.0 seconds
- 100 yards in 10.2 seconds
- 100 meters in 11.0 seconds
- 220 yard hurdles in 33.6 seconds
- 300 meters in 38.6s

He also ran;

- 50 meter in 5.8 seconds
- 200 meters 24.2 seconds
- 220 yards 24.8

He held the joint world record for 60 meters with American sprinter Archie Hahn and held Czech records in the 50m, 60m, 100m, 200m, 300m and 100 yards.

In 1906, Košek took part in 60m sprint in the Austrian Championships. Due to a slow start, he only finished 3rd in the race.

== Personal life ==
Jan's parents died in 1904, in May Františka died and in November it was Jan. Jan Košek is said to have suffered from a thyroid disease, hyperparathyroidism, since childhood. Among other things, it affected his joints. With this disease, the joints stiffen, bones often break, and even if they do not, physical activity causes great pain. At first, the disease probably did not prevent him from his great performances, but later it started to worsen and ended his football career prematurely. What followed was the sad end of one of the fastest men and best strikers on the planet. Jan Košek allegedly ended up in total paralysis, when he was unable to move at all.

Košek is a sibling-in-law to former teammate Jindřich Baumruk, due to Jan marrying Baumruk's sister, Julia Baumrukova. Also Košek's son is Jan Košek.

== Later life and death ==
After his playing career Jan worked in senior positions at Slavia Prague for many years.

He died on 30 December 1927, at the age of 43, which was a young age even for that time. Two days later, on 1 January 1928, an author of České slovo wrote; "14 days ago, we were told by the deceased victim's family that his condition was hopeless and that he was physically unrecognizable. We did not have the courage, knowing him as a man of physical strength and temperament, to visit him.

On 4 January 1928, an author of České slovo wrote; "Yesterday afternoon, a large number of athletes and friends of sports, especially the older generation, gathered to pay their respects to a man who, as a football player and athlete, contributed in an excellent way to the popularity of our sport at home and its good conduct abroad. The memories of the great performances of the phenomenal were alive in everyone's mind of the player Jan Košek and it was too hard to come to terms with the hard fact that he passed away. Above the coffin, decorated with lots of flowers.

Every year, the Slavia Prague delegation commemorated the anniversary of the death of Jan Košek by placing wreaths at his urn at the Vinohrady Cemetery.

== Career statistics ==
Scores and results list the national team's goal tally first, score column indicates score after each Košek goal.

List of international goals scored by Jan Košek
No.	Date	Opponent	Score	Result	Competition	Source
1	7 October 1906	Hungary	3–3	4-4	Official Friendly	
2	7 October 1906	Hungary	4-4	4-4	Official Friendly	
3	6 October 1907	Hungary	1–1	5–3	Official Friendly	
4	6 October 1907	Hungary	2–3	5–3	Official Friendly	
5	6 October 1907	Hungary	3–3	5–3	Official Friendly	
6	6 October 1907	Hungary	4–3	5–3	Official Friendly	
7	6 October 1907	Hungary	5–3	5–3	Official Friendly	
8	25 September 1909	England	1–1	1–10	Official Friendly	
9	27 September 1909	Eastern Counties	1–1	2–2	Official Friendly	
10	27 September 1909	Eastern Counties	2–2	2–2	Official Friendly	
11	27 May 1911	France	2–0	4–1	UIAFA European Tournament	
12	29 May 1911	England AFA	1–1	2–1	UIAFA European Tournament	
13	April 1912	Moravia	1–0	6–1	Official Friendly	
14	April 1912	Moravia	4–0	6–1	Official Friendly	

Appearances and goals by national team and year
National team	Year	Apps	Goals
Bohemia	1903	1	0
Bohemia	1906	1	2
Bohemia	1907	1	5
Bohemia	1908	1	0
Bohemia	1909	2	3
Bohemia	1911	2	2
Bohemia	1912	1	2
Total		9	14

== Honours ==
- Charity Cup: 1910, 1911, 1912
- Silver Cup: 1911
- UIAFA European Tournament: 1911
