= František Kolenatý =

Czechoslovak footballer

Personal information
- Date of birth: 29 January 1900
- Place of birth: Bubny, Prague, Czechoslovakia
- Date of death: 24 February 1956 (aged 56)
- Position: Midfielder

Senior career*
Years	Team	Apps	(Gls)
–1931	Sparta Prague		
1931–1934	Bohemians Prague		

International career
1920–1931	Czechoslovakia	28	(1)
- * Club domestic league appearances and goals

František Kolenatý (29 January 1900 – 24 February 1956) was a Czechoslovak footballer. He played 28 games and scored one goal for the Czechoslovakia national football team. Kolenatý represented Czechoslovakia at the 1920 Olympics and 1924 Olympics.

He spent his club career primarily with Sparta Prague, who were national champions of four occasions during his spell with the club (in 1919 and 1922, prior to the Czechoslovak First League, and in 1925–26 and 1927 following it). He moved to Bohemians Prague during the 1930–31 season, who he played with until 1934.

== Honours ==
Sparta Prague

- Mistrovství ČSF: 1919, 1922
- Czechoslovak First League: 1925–26, 1927
