= 1943–44 Slovenská liga =

Slovenská liga
- Season: 1943–44
- Champions: ŠK Bratislava
- Relegated: FC Vrútky; SK Turčianský Sv. Martin

The 1943–44 Slovenská liga (English:Slovak league) was the sixth season of the Slovenská liga. It is the first tier of league football in the Slovak Republic, formerly part of Czechoslovakia until the German occupation of the country in March 1939.

In the Slovak Republic an independent Slovak league had been established in 1939 and played out its own championship which was won by ŠK Bratislava in 1943–44. In the German-annexed Protectorate of Bohemia and Moravia a separate league, the Národní liga (English:National league), was played and won by Sparta Prague in the 1943–44 season. A national Czechoslovak championship was not played between 1939 and 1945.

== Table ==
For the 1943–44 season ZTK Zvolen and Turčianský Sv. Martin had been newly promoted to the league.

Pos	Team	Pld	W	D	L	GF	GA	GR	Pts
1	ŠK Bratislava (C)	22	18	2	2	121	34	3.559	38
2	OAP Bratislava	22	14	3	5	57	26	2.192	31
3	TSS Trnava	22	11	3	8	52	36	1.444	25
4	Sparta Považská Bystrica	22	12	1	9	66	58	1.138	25
5	HG Šimonovany	22	9	5	8	40	49	0.816	23
6	MŠK Žilina	22	10	2	10	49	49	1.000	22
7	TTS Trenčín	22	7	7	8	43	42	1.024	21
8	Slávia Prešov	22	9	3	10	53	55	0.964	21
9	MFK Ružomberok	22	9	3	10	43	58	0.741	21
10	ZTK Zvolen	22	8	3	11	40	71	0.563	19
11	FC Vrútky (R)	22	4	4	14	42	81	0.519	12
12	Turčianský Sv. Martin (R)	22	1	4	17	19	66	0.288	6

(C) Champions; (R) Relegated
