= Jan Jenny-Starý =

Czech footballer (1884–1959)

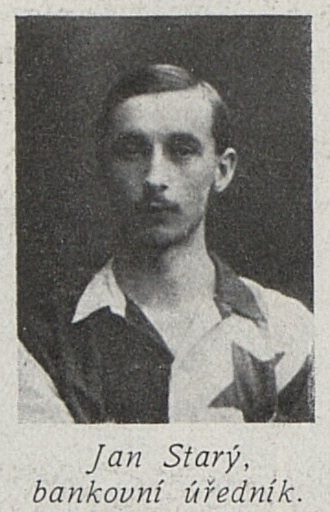
- Jan Starý

Personal information
- Full name: Jan Jenny-Starý
- Date of birth: 7 February 1884
- Place of birth: Austro-Hungarian Empire
- Date of death: 19 August 1959 (aged 75)
- Place of death: Czechoslovakia
- Position: Forward

Senior career*
| Years | Team | Apps | (Gls) |
| 1901–1912 | Slavia Prague | 270 | (339) |

International career
| 1906–1908 | Bohemia | 3 | (2) |
- * Club domestic league appearances and goals

Jan Jenny-Starý (7 February 1884 – 19 August 1959) was a Czech footballer.

== Early life ==
At the age of 11, Jan played youth football for a team in Žitná. Jan later founded a youth football team from Vinohrady Grammar School in Kanálka.

== Club career ==
Jan played his first game in the red and white colours of Slavia Prague, in 1901, in a 8-0 victory over the French side RC Paris. In that same season, Jan was moved down to their reserve team. In 1902, Slavia made the decision to put Jenny-Stary back into the first team line-up. This proved to be a great choice as he picked up 34 goals and 9 assists that year. Jenny-Stary picked up 4 hat-tricks in 5 games from 21 September - 19 October, totalling 14 goals in those 5 games.

1903 saw the arrival of Jan Kosek into the Slavia Prague squad. This in turn hindered Jenny-Stary in getting more first team minutes. He did however, impress in a 20-0 victory over DFC Prag scoring 3 times and assisting twice. He picked up only 9 goal involvements for Slavia's first team that year. Again Kosek would keep Jenny-Stary out for the 1904 season, only playing twice that year, after Kosek had transferred to Sparta Prague.

With 3 first-team players playing for Sparta, Jenny-Stary was put back into the first team, but this time it was indefinitely. In Slavia's first game of 1905, they beat DFC Sturm 14-0, with Stary scoring 7. Stary scored 6, in a 13-0 rout of Berliner Ballspiel, eventually totalling 53 goals for that season. In 1906, Jan starred in two 11-0 victories over Fovarosi and SV Wiesbaden scoring 3 against Fovarosi and 4 against SV Wiesbaden. In total, Jenny-Stary scored 49 goals and assisted on 10 occasions that season.

By 1907, Jenny-Stary had scored 200 goals for Slavia. He scored a hat-trick alongside Ctibor Malý and Josef Bělka in a 9-1 victory over Torino. He scored his first goal, in no less than 15 seconds into the game. He tallied 18 goals and 7 assists, in another triumphant year for Slavia.

== Style of play ==
Jenny-Starý was known for his skill as a technician. Jake Madden once said that, “He could balance the whole forward line with his insight, sophistication, technical and tactical art.”

== Honours ==
Charity Cup: 1910,1911,1912

Silver Cup: 1911
