= Vilém König =

Czech footballer and manager

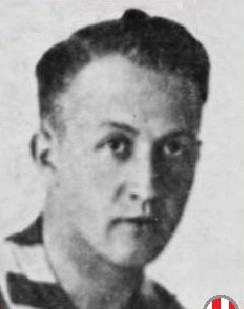

Personal information
- Date of birth: 18 September 1903
- Place of birth: Prague-Žižkov, Austria-Hungary
- Date of death: 5 March 1973 (aged 69)
- Place of death: Czechoslovakia
- Position: Striker

Senior career*
Years	Team	Apps	(Gls)
1925–1929	FK Viktoria Žižkov		
1930–1931	Slavia Prague		
1932–1933	SK Libeň		
1933–1934	Admira Wien		
1934–1935	Marseille		

International career
1926	Czechoslovakia	1	(0)

Managerial career
- 1946–1947: SK Kladno
- 1947–1948: Slavia Prague
- 1950–1951: Slavia Prague
- * Club domestic league appearances and goals

Vilém König (18 September 1903 – 5 March 1973) was a Czech football manager and former player.

As a player, König played for FK Viktoria Žižkov, Slavia Prague, SK Libeň, Admira Vienna and Marseille. König played once for the Czechoslovakia national team.

After finishing his active career, König started to work as a football manager. He coached SK Kladno and Slavia Prague.
