= 1942–43 Národní liga =

Národní liga
- Season: 1942–43
- Champions: Slavia Prague
- Relegated: SK Prostějov; SK Rakovník
- Top goalscorer: Josef Bican (39 goals)

The 1942–43 Národní liga (English: National league) was the fourth season of the Národní liga, the first tier of league football in the Nazi Germany-annexed Protectorate of Bohemia and Moravia which had been part of Czechoslovakia until March 1939.

The Czech championship was won by Slavia Prague, and Josef Bican was the league's top scorer with 39 goals.

Czech clubs in what was now the German-annexed Protectorate of Bohemia and Moravia continued their own league which was variously referred to as the Národní liga (English: National league), Bohemia/Moravia championship or Česko-moravská liga (English: Bohemian-Moravian league) while ethnic-German clubs played in the German Gauliga Sudetenland.

In the Slovak Republic an independent Slovak league, the Slovenská liga, had been established in 1939 and played out its own championship which was won by OAP Bratislava in the 1942–43 season. A national Czechoslovak championship was not played between 1939 and 1945.

== Table ==
For the 1942–43 season SK Nusle and SK Rakovník had been newly promoted to the league.

Pos	Team	Pld	W	D	L	GF	GA	GR	Pts
1	Slavia Prague (C)	22	15	2	5	99	40	2.475	32
2	Sparta Prague	22	13	3	6	78	47	1.660	29
3	Baťa Zlín	22	11	3	8	72	56	1.286	25
4	SK Židenice	22	12	1	9	60	54	1.111	25
5	Bohemians Prague	22	10	3	9	64	69	0.928	23
6	SK Plzeň	22	9	5	8	57	67	0.851	23
7	SK Olomouc ASO	22	9	3	10	59	53	1.113	21
8	SK Pardubice	22	9	2	11	54	51	1.059	20
9	SK Nusle	22	8	3	11	47	63	0.746	19
10	SK Kladno	22	9	1	12	40	63	0.635	19
11	SK Prostějov (R)	22	7	4	11	50	58	0.862	18
12	SK Rakovník (R)	22	3	4	15	37	96	0.385	10

(C) Champions; (R) Relegated

== Results ==
Home \ Away	ZLÍ	BOH	KLA	NUS	OLO	PAR	SKP	PRO	RAK	ŽID	SLA	SPA
Baťa Zlín		1–1	4–2	1–2	2–4	5–1	3–2	2–2	15–1	2–1	0–3	5–4
Bohemians Prague	1–4		6–0	2–6	1–8	6–1	4–4	3–2	5–2	3–2	2–4	1–1
SK Kladno	1–3	3–2		2–1	3–1	3–0	1–1	2–1	3–1	0–4	5–2	1–4
SK Nusle	1–5	0–4	0–3		5–2	1–3	6–0	2–1	2–1	5–2	1–7	6–3
SK Olomouc ASO	4–2	3–4	0–2	2–2		0–3	2–2	3–1	3–1	2–4	2–2	3–1
SK Pardubice	7–2	2–0	7–1	3–1	0–5		2–4	5–1	8–2	5–1	0–1	0–2
SK Plzeň	4–2	4–7	5–0	3–0	0–6	3–2		2–0	3–1	3–2	4–3	1–4
SK Prostějov	1–4	5–2	6–2	0–0	6–2	0–0	4–4		6–2	0–3	3–1	4–3
SK Rakovník	2–2	2–5	3–2	2–2	0–3	2–1	4–4	1–4		3–4	0–8	3–2
SK Židenice	2–3	2–1	3–2	5–2	3–2	5–1	4–1	2–0	6–2		2–2	1–6
Slavia Prague	5–2	11–1	6–2	4–2	7–1	3–0	5–1	9–2	6–0	5–0		3–5
Sparta Prague	5–3	2–3	3–0	8–0	2–1	3–3	5–2	4–1	2–2	4–2	5–2	

Legend: Blue = home team win; Yellow = draw; Red = away team win.
