= Karel Finek =

Czech footballer (1920–1989)

Personal information
- Date of birth: 27 May 1920
- Place of birth: Hradec Králové, Czechoslovakia
- Date of death: 8 September 1989 (aged 69)
- Position: Goalkeeper

Senior career*
Years	Team	Apps	(Gls)
1938–1941	SK Baťov		
1942–1946	Slavia Prague		
1946–1948	Saint-Étienne	28	(0)

International career
1946	Czechoslovakia	2	(0)

Managerial career
- 1956–1957: Cracovia
- 1958: Śląsk Wrocław
- 1959–1960: Slavia Prague
- 1960–1961: Wisła Kraków
- 1961: Cracovia
- 1962–1963: Garbarnia Kraków
- 1963–1964: Slavia Prague
- 1965–1966: SpVgg Weiden
- 1966: FC Amberg
- * Club domestic league appearances and goals

Karel Finek (27 May 1920 – 8 September 1989) was a Czech football player and manager.

He played for SK Baťov, Slavia Prague and Saint-Étienne. He capped twice for Czechoslovakia.

He coached Cracovia, Śląsk Wrocław, Slavia Prague, Wisła Kraków, Garbarnia Kraków, SpVgg Weiden and FC Amberg.
