= Jindřich Baumruk =

Czech footballer (1881–1964)

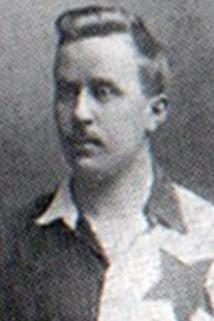
- Baumruk circa 1907

Personal information
- Date of birth: 23 September 1881
- Place of birth: Rakovník, Austria-Hungary
- Date of death: 5 May 1964 (aged 82)
- Position: Forward

Senior career*
Years	Team	Apps	(Gls)
1896–1904	Slavia Prague		
1904–1905	Sparta Prague		
1905–1907	Slavia Prague		

International career
1906	Bohemia	1	(1)
- * Club domestic league appearances and goals

Jindřich Baumruk (23 September 1881 – 5 May 1964) was a Czech footballer who played as a forward.

== Club career ==
Baumruk started his career at Slavia Prague in 1896, at just 15. His first recorded game was in 1897 as Slavia Prague took on their "B" side at beat them 3–1, to win the Czech Crown. Baumruk won the Mistrovství Čech a Moravy, 4 consecutive times from 1897-1899, this is due to the 1897 seasons having an Autumn season and Spring season. Baumruk took part in the first international game involving a Czech team, turning out for a Prague XI against Berlin on 8 January 1899.

A hat-trick against Union Vienna was Baumruk's best performance of 1900 and this result meant that Slavia hit double digits for the fourth time that season. Baumruk continued his great form into the 1901 season, scoring 2 against Civil Service in October. One of his goals came through dribbling through several defenders and placing it past the keeper. He played 13 games in 1901, scoring 7 goals and assisting 8 times

On 16 March 1902, Slavia defeated CAFC Vinohrady 9-1 with Baumruk achieving 3 assists. A week later, he repeated this feat against Karlsvorstadt Stuttgart in a 9-2 triumph. By 1902 Baumruk had 71 goals for Slavia Prague. An incredible 34 goals and 30 assists in only 25 games that season.

In 1903, Baumruk contributed 5 times against Graphia Vienna, he scored 2 goals and got 3 assists. Throughout the 1903 campaign, Baumruk again proved that he was one of the best right-wingers in continental Europe scoring 24 goals and assisting on 31 occasions. In 1904, he prevailed again against Civil Service, assisting on 4 occasions, as Slavia Prague bettered their opponents 6-3.

In November of 1904, Baumruk, Jan Košek and Rudolf Krummer headed to Sparta Prague for a year. Before the season ended, Baumruk returned to Slavia Prague earlier than the others, with only 4 games, 1 goal and two assists to his a name Sparta Prague shirt. Upon returning to Slavia Prague he totalled 19 goal contributions in only 11 games. In 1906, he scored two in a 3–3 draw against Scottish champions Celtic. He showed signs of his earlier form, amounting 17 assists, 13 goals in just 19 games. He finalised his time at Slavia Prague, in 1907 where he picked 3 goals and 5 assists in 4 games, before hanging up his boots.

== Personal life ==
Baumruk is a sibling-in-law to former teammate Jan Košek, due to Jan marrying Baumruk's sister. Also Baumruk's nephew is Jan Košek being his sister's son. Jindřich Baumruk, still in his seventies, remembered the beginnings of football in Prague, "On Vinohradská Kanálka, a flat plot in the place of today's Riegrový Sady, where students from both Vinohrady secondary schools - from the gymnasium in Hálková street and from the Na Smetánce school used to gather to play football.

== Honours ==
- Mistrovství Čech a Morav: 1897 (spring), 1897 (autumn), 1898, 1899, 1900, 1901
