= SK Nusle =

- Full name: SK Nusle z.s.
- Founded: 1903
- Ground: Děkanská vinice I 987/5; Prague 4; 140 00
- League: 8. league, Class 2 (group B)
- 2025–26: 5th
- Website: https://sknusle.cz/

SK Nusle is a Czech football club located in the district of Nusle in the city of Prague. Founded in 1903, it is one of the oldest clubs in the country. It is one of two clubs from the area to have played in the nation's top division of football, the other being Nuselský SK.

The club played in the Czechoslovak First League, the top flight of Czechoslovak football, in the 1942–43 season and the 1943–44 season.

== Historical names ==
- 1903: SK Nusle
- 1948: Sokol (Jawa) Nusle
- 1953: Spartak Praha Nusle Závody 9.května
- 1957: Spartak Jawa Nusle
- 1968: SK Nusle
