= Radek Černý =

Czech footballer

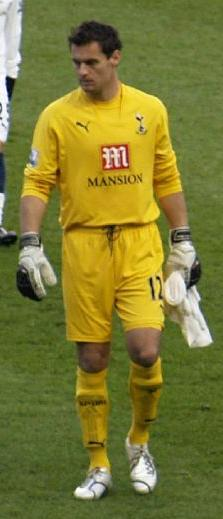

Personal information
- Full name: Radek Černý
- Date of birth: 18 February 1974 (age 52)
- Place of birth: Prague, Czechoslovakia
- Height: 6 ft 3 in (1.91 m)
- Position: Goalkeeper

Youth career
- 1980–1993: Slavia Prague

Senior career*
Years	Team	Apps	(Gls)
1993–1995	SK České Budějovice JČE	7	(0)
1995–1996	Union Cheb	12	(0)
1996–2008	Slavia Prague	178	(1)
2005–2008	→ Tottenham Hotspur (loan)	16	(0)
2008–2013	Queens Park Rangers	78	(0)
2013–2014	Slavia Prague	15	(0)
Total		306	(1)

International career
1994–1996	Czech Republic U21	11	(0)
2000–2002	Czech Republic	3	(0)
- * Club domestic league appearances and goals

Radek Černý (Czech pronunciation: [ˈradek ˈtʃerniː]; born 18 February 1974) is a Czech former footballer who played as a goalkeeper. He played principally for Slavia Prague in the Czech First League between its inception in 1993 and 2005, when he moved to England. Černý spent eight years in England with Tottenham Hotspur and Queens Park Rangers before returning to his former club Slavia in 2013, where he played one season before his retirement. Černý enjoyed a brief international career, making three appearances for the Czech Republic between 2000 and 2002.

== Club career ==
=== Slavia Prague ===
Born in Prague, Czechoslovakia, Černý turned professional in 1993 as a 17-year-old with Slavia Prague, his home team. His father was a goalkeeper, who started out as a youth at Slavia before playing in the Czech third and fourth divisions, while Černý's older brother Petr was another goalkeeper playing for the club.

Černý did not get a chance to play for Slavia in the early years of his career, having been loaned out to three different Czech clubs and not returning until 1997, when he finally made his debut. Petr Černý was later signed as a deputy to his younger brother.

Černý played for SK České Budějovice JČE in the first two seasons of the Gambrinus Liga and Union Cheb in the third before playing for Slavia's first team. He went on to make more than 150 appearances for Slavia, many of them in European competition. He was twice a domestic cup winner – 1999 and 2002 – and scored one goal, the last goal in a 4-0 league victory against FK Jablonec 97 in the 1999–2000 season. He left the Czech Republic in 2005 with a total of 197 appearances in the Czech First League.

=== Tottenham Hotspur ===
Černý joined Spurs on an 18-month loan in January 2005, which was extended until the end of 2008 to replace Kasey Keller who, finding himself unable to win back the Spurs number one jersey from Paul Robinson, had signed for Borussia Mönchengladbach. Spurs had also signed Márton Fülöp, a young Hungarian goalkeeper, in the previous summer, but it was Černý who was called to deputise for Robinson for the last three games of the 2004/05 season. He made his debut at White Hart Lane against Aston Villa. Spurs won 5–1 but were unable to win a UEFA Cup spot that season.

Černý played in the Peace Cup pre-season tournament in South Korea, which Spurs won, but once Robinson returned, Černý was back on the bench again. Černý did not make an appearance in the 2005/06 season as Spurs finished fifth.

The 2006/07 season was more of the same for Černý, as Robinson, now the established number one for club and country, was initially playing in all of Spurs' matches, despite them playing in four competitions. Fülöp had left to join Sunderland and Robert Burch, a former youth team player, was being loaned out without starting for any of the clubs who employed him. Robinson was injured in March 2007 for the FA Cup quarter-final at Chelsea where Černý made his first competitive appearance for nearly two years in a memorable match that ended 3–3. Robinson returned for the replay, which Spurs lost 2–1. Černý was on the bench for the rest of the season as Spurs finished fifth again.

The 2007/08 season began badly for Spurs, with Martin Jol leaving in November 2007 and Robinson under pressure after making a number of goalkeeping errors. New manager Juande Ramos eventually lost patience with Robinson's loss of form and for the first time in his Tottenham Hotspur career, Černý displaced Robinson, being preferred for the League Cup semi-final first-leg at Arsenal. However, Robinson again replaced Černý after a Černý goalkeeping error in the UEFA Cup against his former team threatened Tottenham's chances of winning in the round.

=== Queens Park Rangers ===
On 4 May 2008, Černý told Sky Sports News that he would be joining QPR of the Championship at the end of the season because of the lack of first team action at Spurs. The transfer was confirmed on 13 May. He made his debut in the QPR 2–1 victory over Barnsley at Loftus Road. After some uncertain displays at the start of the year, a string of fine performances enabled Černý to establish himself as the R's first-choice goalkeeper. He was left out of the 2012–13 QPR Premier League squad, losing out to fellow goalkeepers, Júlio César, Robert Green and Brian Murphy.

=== Return to Slavia Prague ===
Radek Černý spent the 2013–14 season at Slavia Prague before ending his professional career in 2014.

== International career ==
Černý has represented the Czech Republic at youth level, earning 11 caps for the Czech Republic Under-21. He has also represented the Czech senior squad three times during his time at Slavia Prague.

== Honours ==
Tottenham Hotspur

- Football League Cup: 2007–08

Queens Park Rangers

- Football League Championship: 2010–11
