= 1925 Czechoslovak First League =

Czechoslovak First League
- Season: 1925
- Dates: 1 March – 8 November
- Champions: Slavia Prague
- Relegated: DFC Prag
- Matches: 81
- Goals: 206 (2.54 per match)
- Top goalscorer: Jan Vaník (13 goals)

Statistics of Czechoslovak First League in the 1925 season. Jan Vaník was the league's top scorer with 13 goals.

== Overview ==
It was contested by 10 teams, and Slavia Prague won the championship.

== League standings ==
Pos	Team	Pld	W	D	L	GF	GA	GR	Pts
1	Slavia Prague (C)	9	7	1	1	38	10	3.800	15
2	Sparta Prague	9	7	1	1	28	8	3.500	15
3	Viktoria Žižkov	9	4	3	2	21	16	1.313	11
4	DFC Prag	9	4	2	3	20	12	1.667	10
5	ČAFC Vinohrady	9	4	1	4	7	17	0.412	9
6	Čechie Karlín	9	2	4	3	13	19	0.684	8
7	SK Libeň	9	3	1	5	20	32	0.625	7
8	AFK Vršovice	9	3	0	6	19	28	0.679	6
9	Nuselský SK	9	2	1	6	16	30	0.533	5
10	Meteor Prague VIII	9	1	2	6	14	24	0.583	4

Source: rsssf.com
(C) Champions

== Results ==
Home \ Away	VRŠ	VIN	KAR	DFC	MET	NUS	LIB	SLA	SPA	ŽIŽ
AFK Vršovice					3–2	3–2			2–3	4–3
ČAFC Vinohrady	2–1		0–0	1–0	2–1		1–0		0–1	
Čechie Karlín	3–2				1–5	2–1	0–1			
DFC Prag	4–1		2–2		3–1	4–0				1–1
Meteor Prague VIII							1–4			
Nuselský SK		8–0			1–1				0–8	1–3
SK Libeň	4–3			1–4		1–3		3–9	2–7	4–4
Slavia Prague	5–0	3–0	2–2	4–2	5–0	8–0				
Sparta Prague			4–1	1–0	2–2			2–0		0–1
Viktoria Žižkov		3–1	2–2		3–1			1–2		

Source: statistiky1ligy.fotbal.cz
Legend: Blue = home team win; Yellow = draw; Red = away team win.
