= Ctibor Malý =

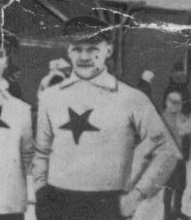
- Malý whilst at Slavia Prague

Personal information
- Full name: Ctibor Jindřich Malý
- Date of birth: 7 December 1885
- Place of birth: Prague, Austria-Hungary
- Date of death: 8 January 1968 (aged 82)
- Position: Forward

Senior career*
| Years | Team | Apps | (Gls) |
| 1905–1909 | Slavia Prague | 190 | (189) |
| 1910 | Pardubice | | |

International career
| 1906–1908 | Bohemia | 3 | (0) |
- * Club domestic league appearances and goals

Ctibor Jindřich Malý (7 December 1885 – 8 January 1968) was a Czech footballer who played as a forward.

== Club career ==
A Prague native, Malý began his career with Slavia Prague in 1905, playing with the club over the course of five seasons, winning the Charity Cup with Slavia in 1908. In 1910, Malý signed for Pardubice, playing for the club for a season.

== International career ==
On 7 October 1906, Malý made his debut for Bohemia in a 4–4 draw against Hungary. Malý would go on to make two more appearances for Bohemia.

== Ice hockey career ==
Whilst still playing for Slavia Prague, Malý represented Slavia's ice hockey team, playing as a centre. Malý represented Bohemia in their first game at the 1909 Coupe de Chamonix.
