= Jaroslav Jareš =

Czech footballer and manager

Personal information
- Date of birth: 21 March 1930
- Place of birth: Prague, Czechoslovakia
- Date of death: 5 September 2016 (aged 86)
- Position: Striker

Youth career
- Sparta Michle

Senior career*
Years	Team	Apps	(Gls)
1948–1953	Sparta Krč		
1954–1955	Sparta Prague		
1956–1957	Slavia Prague		
1958–1959	Sparta Prague		
1960–1965	Spartak Radotín		

Managerial career
- 1961–1968: Spartak Radotín
- 1969–1972: Spartak Mělník
- 1973–1979: Slavia Prague
- 1984–1986: Slavia Prague
- 1987–1990: Dukla Prague
- * Club domestic league appearances and goals

Jaroslav Jareš (21 March 1930 – 5 September 2016) was a Czech football player and manager.

During his Czechoslovak first division career, Jareš played for Slavia Prague and Sparta Prague. He won the Czechoslovak First League with Sparta in 1954.

After finishing his active career, Jareš started to work as a football manager. He coached Slavia Prague in two separate stints, once in 1973-1979 and again in 1984–1986. Under his management, Slavia ended up third in the Czechoslovak League on four occasions. From 1987-1990 he coached Dukla Prague and finished second in the league in the 1987–1988 season.
