= Emil Seifert =

Czech footballer and manager

Personal information
- Date of birth: 28 April 1900
- Place of birth: Prague, Austria-Hungary
- Date of death: 20 October 1973 (aged 73)
- Place of death: Czechoslovakia
- Position: Midfielder

Youth career
- 1915–1918: FK Viktoria Žižkov

Senior career*
Years	Team	Apps	(Gls)
1918–1921	FK Viktoria Žižkov		
1921–1929	Slavia Prague		
1929–1930	Bohemians Prague		
1930–1934	Slavia Prague		

International career
1920–1929	Czechoslovakia	18	(0)

Managerial career
- 1939–1946: Slavia Prague
- 1952–1953: Slavia Prague
- * Club domestic league appearances and goals

Emil Seifert (28 April 1900 - 20 October 1973) was a Czech football manager and former player.

Seifert played for three teams based in the city of Prague. He won the Czechoslovak First League with Slavia Prague in 1925, 1929 and 1931. Seifert was a member of the Czechoslovakia national team and participated at the 1920 Summer Olympics and 1924 Summer Olympics.

After finishing his active career, Seifert started to work as a football manager. He coached most notably Slavia Prague. Under his management, Slavia won the Czechoslovak First League four times, in 1940, 1941, 1942 and 1943. He later led also the youth teams at Slavia.
