= Berliner FV =

German football club

- Full name: Berliner Fußball-Verein 1910
- Founded: 1910
- Dissolved: 1991
- League: defunct
Home colours	Away colours

Berliner FV was a German association football club from the city of Berlin. It was established 16 August 1910 as Berliner Fußball-Verein Ost 1910, but quickly became known simply as Berliner FV, and went on to play a single season in the top-flight Oberliga Berlin in 1921–22. On 6 June 1926 the club merged with Berliner Sportclub Vorwärts Ost 1912 to play again as Berliner FV Ost 1910.

Following World War II, occupying Allied authorities ordered most organizations in the country disbanded, including sports and football clubs. In late 1945, the former membership became part of Sportgruppe Hohenschönhausen which became Hohenschönhausener Sport-Club in 1949 and Sportgemeinschaft Hohenschönhausen in 1953. The club was part of the separate football competition that emerged in Soviet-occupied East Germany. With the reunification of Germany in 1990 the club again briefly played as Hohenschönhausener SC before joining Weißenseer Sportverein Rot-Weiß (formerly BSG Motor Weißensee) on 19 July 1991 to become Hohenschönhausener SV Rot-Weiß. In May 2011, HSV Rot-Weiß merged with another neighboring club Weißenseer FC (formerly BSG Einheit Weißensee) and the new side continued with the latter name.
