= Josef Bělka =

Czech soccer player and soccer coach (1886–1944)

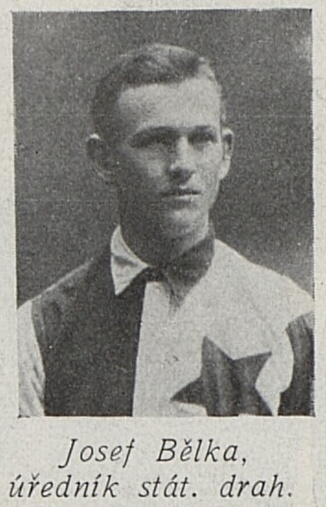
- Portrait of Bělka

Personal information
- Date of birth: 20 February 1886
- Place of birth: Nehvizdy, Austria-Hungary
- Date of death: 14 March 1944 (aged 58)
- Place of death: Hlásná Třebaň, Bohemia and Moravia
- Position: Forward

Senior career*
Years	Team	Apps	(Gls)
1905–1906	Sparta Prague		
1907–1909	Slavia Prague		
1910–1912	Sparta Prague		
1913–1918	Slavia Prague		

International career
1907–1908	Bohemia	4	(4)

Managerial career
- 1925–1927: Viktoria Žižkov
- * Club domestic league appearances and goals

Josef Bělka (20 February 1886 – 14 March 1944) was a Czech footballer who played as a forward. Throughout his career at Slavia Prague, Josef played 428 games and scored 422 goals.

== Club career ==
Bělka began his career at Sparta Prague, playing for the club for two seasons, before joining rivals Slavia Prague in 1907. On 13 October 1907, in his first game against his old club, Bělka scored twice for Slavia in a 2–2 draw against Sparta Prague. Just over a month later, on 24 November 1907, Bělka scored five times for Slavia in a 9–1 derby win away to Sparta Prague. Despite his good early form at Slavia Prague, Bělka could not displace striker Jan Košek and on 31 December 1909, Bělka requested a transfer back to Sparta Prague.

In 1912, Bělka won his first league title with Sparta Prague, however on 31 December 1912, Bělka sought out Slavia Prague manager Jake Madden, asking to return to the club as Košek was coming to the end of his career. Bělka subsequently returned to Slavia, winning the 1913 league title in his first season back at the club. Bělka was used as the main striker for Slavia in his second spell at the club, before his retirement from playing at the age of 32 in the autumn of 1918. Upon his retirement, Bělka's place in the Slavia squad was taken by Jan Vaník. Throughout his career at Slavia Prague, Josef played 428 games and scored 422 goals.

== International career ==
On 7 April 1907, Bělka made his debut for Bohemia in a 5–2 loss against Hungary. On 6 October 1907, in his second cap for Bohemia, Bělka scored his first goals for Bohemia in a 5–3 win against Hungary. In total, Bělka made four appearances for Bohemia, scoring four times.

=== International goals ===
Scores and results list Bohemia's goal tally first.

#	Date	Venue	Opponent	Score	Result	Competition
1	6 October 1907	Stadion Slavii, Prague, Austria-Hungary	Hungary	3–3	5–3	Friendly
2	6 October 1907	Stadion Slavii, Prague, Austria-Hungary	Hungary	5–3	5–3	Friendly
3	5 April 1908	Millenáris Sporttelep, Budapest, Austria-Hungary	Hungary	1–1	2–5	Friendly
4	5 April 1908	Millenáris Sporttelep, Budapest, Austria-Hungary	Hungary	2–2	2–5	Friendly

== Managerial career ==
In 1925, upon the formation of the professional Czechoslovak First League, Bělka was appointed manager of Viktoria Žižkov. In 1927, Bělka departed Viktoria Žižkov, leaving football.
