= Jan Košek (ice hockey) =

Czech ice hockey player

Personal information
- Nationality: Czech
- Born: 11 January 1914; Prague, Austria-Hungary
- Died: 7 March 1979 (aged 65); České Budějovice, Czechoslovakia

Sport
- Sport: Ice hockey

Jan Košek (11 January 1914 – 7 March 1979) was a Czech ice hockey player. He competed in the men's tournament at the 1936 Winter Olympics.
