= FK Meteor Prague VIII =

Association football club in Czechia

- Full name: FK Meteor Prague VIII
- Founded: 1896
- Ground: Areál Libeň, Prague
- Capacity: 3,500
- Chairman: Ondřej Lněnička
- Manager: Jan Fíček
- League: Czech Fourth Division – Divize B
- 2025–26: 7th
Home colours	Away colours

FK Meteor Prague VIII is a football club located in Prague-Libeň, Czech Republic. It currently plays in the Czech Fourth Division. Founded in 1896, it is one of the oldest football clubs in the country. The club played in the inaugural Czechoslovak First League in 1925. The club was promoted to the third-tier Bohemian Football League from Divize B of the Czech Fourth Division in 2013.

== Reserves ==
As of 2011–12, Meteor's reserve team, FK Meteor Prague VIII B, play in the I.B class.

== Historical names ==
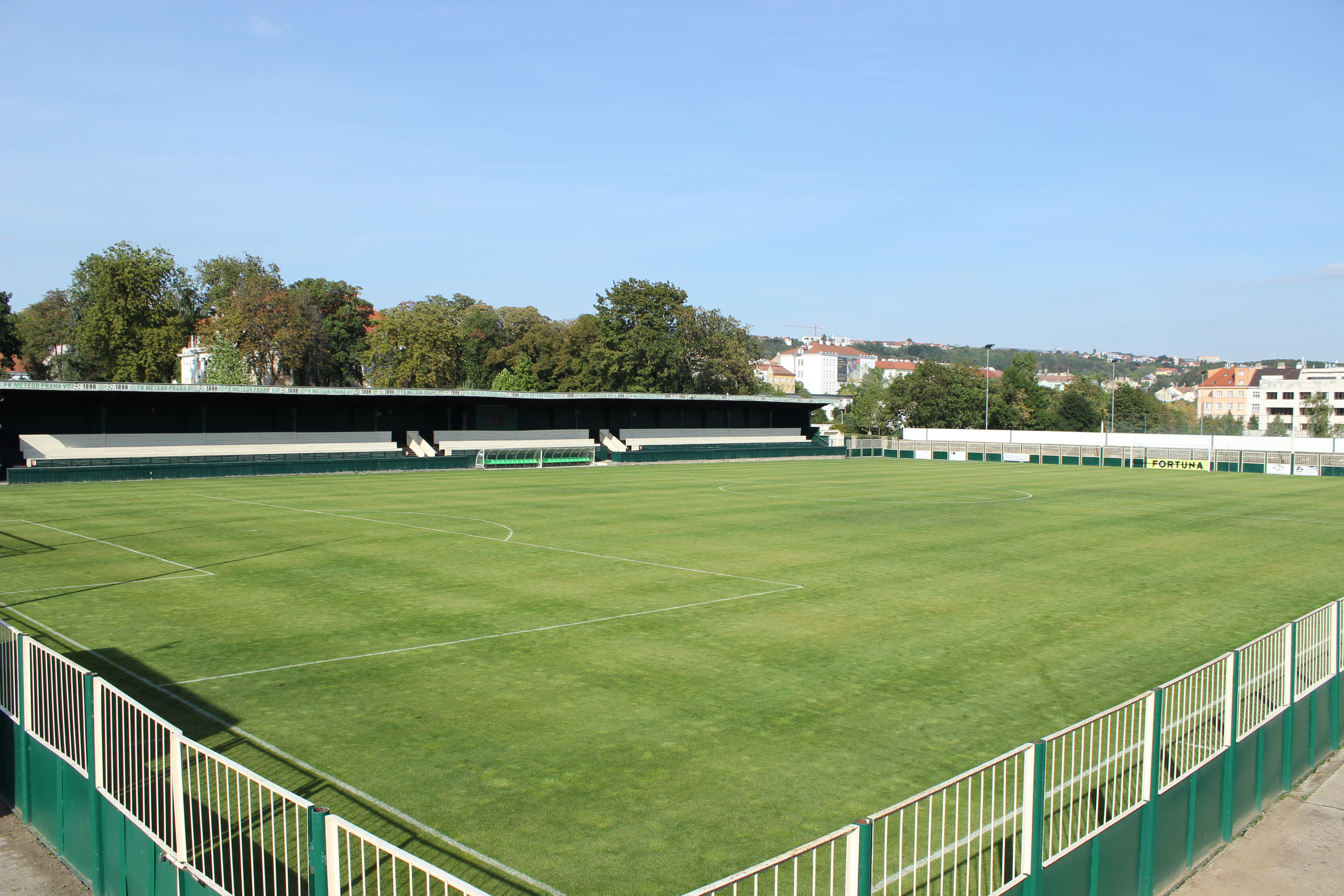
Fotbalový areál Libeň, stadium of Meteor Prague

- 1896 Sportovní kroužek Kotva Libeň
- 1899 SK Meteor Libeň
- 1901 SK Meteor Praha VIII
- 1948 Sokol České Loděnice
- 1953 DSO Spartak Loděnice
- 1957 TJ Libeň Loděnice
- 1966 TJ Meteor Praha
- 1976 TJ Meteor Praha ŽSP
- 1986 TJ Meteor Praha
- 1990 SK Meteor Praha
- 1994 FK Meteor Praha VIII

== Honours ==
- Czech Fourth Division Divize B
  - Champions: 2012–13
- Prague Championship (fifth tier)
  - Champions: 2007–08
