= SK Polaban Nymburk =

Football club located in Nymburk, Czech republic

Polaban Nymburk
- Full name: SK Polaban Nymburk, z.s.
- Founded: 1909
- Chairman: Patrik Fiferna
- Manager: Radek Hanuš
- League: I.A třída skupina B
- 2022–23: 6th

SK Polaban Nymburk is a football club located in the town of Nymburk in the Central Bohemian Region of the Czech Republic. The club currently plays in the Středočeský kraj I.A třída skupina B.

The club played in the Czechoslovak First League, the top flight of Czechoslovak football, in the 1945–46 season. The club also played top-flight football in the early 1940s.

== Historical names ==
Former club logo

- SK Nymburk (1900–1901)
- SK Polaban Nymburk (1902–1948)
- Lokomotiva Nymburk (1949–1952)
- ČSD Nymburk (1952–1953)
- Lokomotiva Nymburk (1953–1991)
- Polaban Nymburk (1991–2005)
- SK POLABAN Nymburk (od 2005)
