= Nuselský SK =

- Full name: Nuselský SK
- Founded: 1909
- Dissolved: 2003
- Ground: Stadion na Vyskočilově ulici

Nuselský SK was a Czechoslovak football club from the town of Nusle – later incorporated into the city of Prague. The club played in the first three seasons of the Czechoslovak First League. In 2003 the club merged with AFK Podolí and ceased to exist in its own right. It is one of two clubs from the area to have played in the nation's top division of football, the other being SK Nusle.

== Historical names ==
- 1909 NSK
- 1912 Nuselský SK
- 1948 Sokol (Masna) Nuselský
- 1953 Slavoj Praha (PPM)
