= ČAFC Prague =

- Full name: ČAFC Prague
- Founded: 1899
- Ground: K vodě 2 Prague 10 – Záběhlice
- Manager: Zdeněk Herink
- League: 1.A Třida, skupina A
- 2025–26: 13th
Home colours

ČAFC Prague is a Czech football club located in Prague-Záběhlice. It currently plays in the 1.A Třida, skupina A, which is in the sixth tier of the Czech football system. It is one of the oldest football clubs in the country. ČAFC played in the highest division of football in Czechoslovakia in the 1920s, taking part in the inaugural national league, the 1925 Czechoslovak First League.

== Historical names ==
- 1899 – 1918 ČAFC Královské Vinohrady
- 1918 – 1948 ČAFC Vinohrady
- 1948 – 1950 Sokol ČAFC Vinohrady
- 1951 – 1952 Instalační závody ČAFC
- 1952 – 1953 Tatran Stavomontáže B
- 1953 – 1968 Tatran Pozemní stavby
- 1968 – 1979 ČAFC Praha
- 1979 – 1990 Tatran Stavební závody
- 1990 – ČAFC Praha
