= SK Olomouc ASO =

- Full name: SK Olomouc ASO
- Founded: 1912
- Dissolved: 1951
- Ground: Andrův stadion

SK Olomouc ASO was a Czechoslovak football club from the town of Olomouc, which played four seasons in the Czechoslovak First League. It was founded in 1912 as SK Olomouc. The club's last top-flight season was the 1946–47 Czechoslovak First League, finishing in 12th position among 14 teams. The club ceased to exist in 1951.

== Historical names ==
- 1912 – SK Olomouc
- 1937 – SK Olomouc ASO
- 1948 – Sokol Olomouc ASO
- 1949 – Sokol OD Olomouc
