= Football league system in Czechoslovakia =

Football league system in Czechoslovakia was a series of interconnected leagues for club football in Czechoslovakia.

== The system ==
=== 1990s ===
Level	League(s)/Division(s)						
1	Czechoslovak First League; 16 clubs						
2	Česká národní fotbalová liga 16 clubs					Slovenská národná futbalová liga 16 clubs	
3	ČFL; 18 clubs			MSFL; 16 clubs		2. SNFL East; 16 clubs	2. SNFL West; 16 clubs
4	Divize A 16 clubs	Divize B 16 clubs	Divize C 16 clubs	Divize D 16 clubs	Divize E 16 clubs		

== See also ==
- Football league system in the Czech Republic
- Football league system in Slovakia
