= SK Slavia Prague =

Czech association football club

Slavia Prague
- Full name: Sportovní klub Slavia Praha – fotbal a.s.
- Nicknames: Červenobílí (The Red and Whites); Sešívaní (The Stitched) (Note: Sešívaní means "stitched together", referring to the home kit with a red half and white half which were traditionally sewn together.); Slávisté (The Slavists)
- Founded: 1892; 134 years ago as ACOS (Akademický cyklistický odbor Slavia)
- Ground: Fortuna Arena
- Capacity: 19,370
- Owner: Pavel Tykač
- President: Jaroslav Tvrdík
- Manager: Jindřich Trpišovský
- League: Czech First League
- 2025–26: 1st of 16 (champions)
- Website: slavia.cz
Home colours	Away colours	Third colours

Sportovní klub Slavia Praha – fotbal (Sports Club Slavia Prague – Football, pronounced [ˈslaːvɪja ˈpraɦa]), commonly known as Slavia Praha or Slavia Prague, is a Czech professional football club in Prague. Founded in 1892 as a literary and cycling club, they are the second most successful club in the Czech Republic since its independence in 1993.

They play in the Czech First League, the top division in the Czech Republic. They play the Prague derby with Sparta Prague, the most prominent rivalry in Czech football. Slavia has won 22 league titles, 11 Czech cups, and the Mitropa Cup in 1938. The club has won nine league titles since the foundation of the Czech league in 1993. They have also reached the semi-finals of the 1995–96 UEFA Cup and qualified for the 2007–08 UEFA Champions League group stage for the first time in their history. In 2019, Slavia reached the quarter-finals of the 2018–19 UEFA Europa League and also qualified for the 2019–20 UEFA Champions League group stage for the second time in their history. They once again reached the Europa League quarter-finals in 2020–21. In the title-winning 2020–21 Czech First League season the team completed an entire season undefeated and set a Czech record for the longest top-flight unbeaten league run at 54 games between 2020 and 2021.

In addition to their men's squad, Slavia Prague has two reserves (SK Slavia Prague B and SK Slavia Prague C), youth, and women's teams.

== History ==
Slavia Prague was founded on 2 November 1892 (Note: In 2020, the Odbor přátel (coalition of fan organisations) has uncovered that the club was actually established on 14 November 1892, the traditional date being erroneously reported in the year 1902 by an article commemorating 10 and then repeated from this article.) by medicine students in Vinohrady, Prague, as a literary and cycling club. The club soon ceased to exist and a new one was founded in 1895. The new club initially focused on cycling, and expanded to football in 1896. On 25 March of that year, Slavia won their first match against AC Prague 5–0. The captain of this team was Karel Freja. Four days later, Slavia played against Sparta Prague, with the match finishing 0–0, this match being the start of the rivalry between these two clubs.

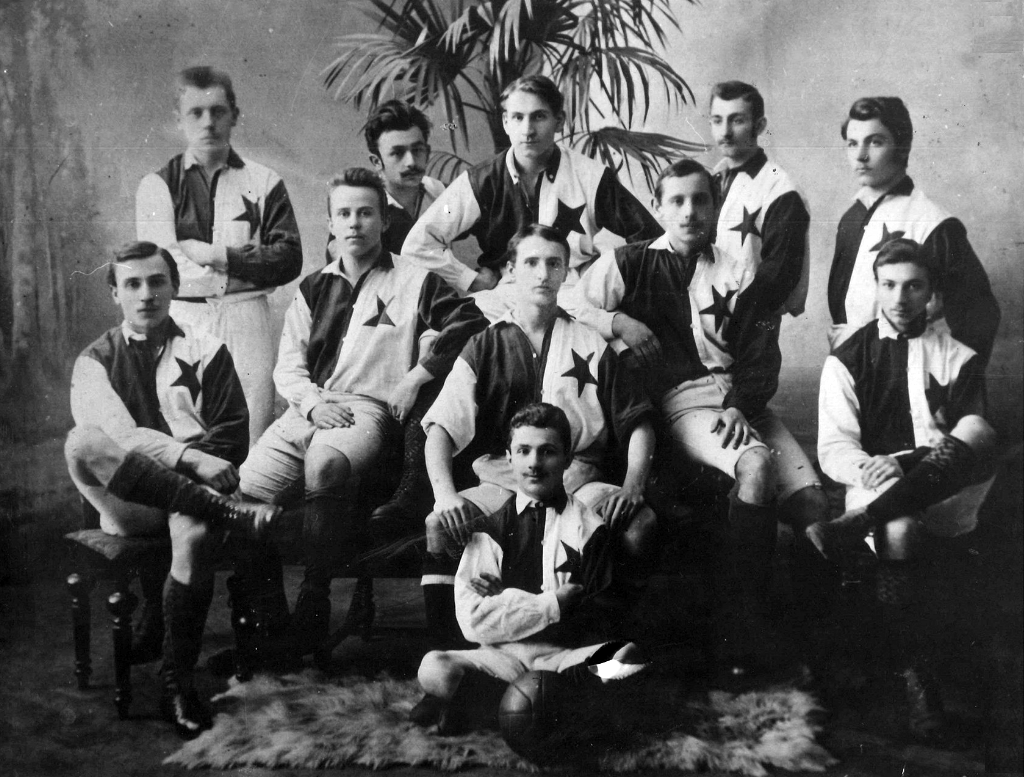
SK Slavia Prague team in 1901

In 1905, Scottish manager and former Celtic player Johnny Madden brought new tactics and views on football from his home country to the club. He managed to set up an early golden age for the club that lasted 25 years. Under Madden Slavia won 134 domestic matches out of a total of 169, and 304 internationals out of 429 between 1905 and 1930. In 1930, Madden retired from Slavia and professional football at the age of 66, though he remained in Prague for the rest of his life.

In the 1934 World Cup, the Czechoslovak national team included eight Slavia players. The second golden period came when Slavia bought Josef Bican from Admira Vienna. Slavia with Bican won titles in 1940, 1941, 1942 and 1943, while many football players were at war. In 1951 Slavia finished in 11th position in the league. Poor results continued during the 1950s and 1960s when Slavia were relegated twice, in 1961 and 1963. They next played in the top level of football in 1965.

In 1996, Slavia won their 14th title after 49 years. During this season, Slavia played in the semi-final of the UEFA Cup and four players of this team had big importance for the silver medal-winning Czech team from UEFA Euro 1996.

Slavia participated in the qualifying rounds for the UEFA Champions League five times (1996, 2000, 2001, 2004 and 2005), being eliminated each time until finally qualifying for the group stage in the 2007–08 season following a 3–1 aggregate victory over Ajax in the third qualifying round. For the group stage, Slavia were drawn in Group H along with Arsenal, Steaua București and Sevilla. They started with a 2–1 win at home against Steaua and a 4–2 loss to Sevilla. Next came two matches against Arsenal; Slavia lost 7–0 at the Emirates Stadium, but eventually draw 0–0 in the second leg. In Bucharest came a 1–1 draw, which qualified the Czech team for the UEFA Cup round of 32, from third place in Group H, in spite of a home 0–3 defeat against Sevilla.

In October 2006, the construction of the new and long-awaited stadium at Eden for 21,000 spectators began. The stadium was opened on 7 May 2008 with an exhibition match against Oxford University.

In the 2007–08 and 2008–09, Slavia were back-to-back Czech champions, but did not play in the Champions League group stage due to elimination in the qualifying rounds by Fiorentina (0–2 on aggregate in 2008–09) and Sheriff Tiraspol (1–1 on away goals rule in 2009–10). In the 2009–10 Czech First League, the club managed only seventh place in the league.

In the autumn of 2010, the club found itself in crisis due to its economic problems. It was discovered that Slavia owed 112 million Czech koruna to the club's former owner, ENIC Sports Ltd (English National Investment Company). As a result, major cost-cutting was needed to service this debt and it was confirmed that the squad needed to be purged. In addition to the players sold, midfielder Petr Trapp left the club mid-season, claiming that Slavia had not paid his wages for three months.

On 5 May 2011, the first leg of the cup semi-final against Olomouc was suspended after the first half at a score of 1–1 due to Slavia fans invaded the pitch in protest against the deteriorating financial situation of the club. As a result of this action, Sigma were awarded a 3–0 win.

In September 2015, CEFC China Energy Company bought the team. From November 2018, the club was owned by the Sinobo Group and CITIC Group.

Since December 2023, the club is owned by the Czech businessman Pavel Tykač, who bought the club from its Chinese owners for a reported sum of 2 billion Czech crowns.

== Historical names ==
- 1892 – SK ACOS Praha (Sportovní klub Akademický cyklistický odbor Slavia Praha)
- 1893 – SK Slavia Praha (Sportovní klub Slavia Praha)
- 1948 – Sokol Slavia Praha
- 1949 – ZSJ Dynamo Slavia Praha (Základní sportovní jednota Dynamo Slavia Praha)
- 1953 – DSO Dynamo Praha (Dobrovolná sportovní organizace Dynamo Praha)
- 1954 – TJ Dynamo Praha (Tělovýchovná jednota Dynamo Praha)
- 1965 – SK Slavia Praha (Sportovní klub Slavia Praha)
- 1973 – TJ Slavia Praha (Tělovýchovná jednota Slavia Praha)
- 1977 – TJ Slavia IPS Praha (Tělovýchovná jednota Slavia Inženýrské průmyslové stavby Praha)
- 1978 – SK Slavia IPS Praha (Sportovní klub Slavia Inženýrské průmyslové stavby Praha)
- 1991 – SK Slavia Praha (Sportovní klub Slavia Praha – fotbal, a.s.)

== Club symbols ==
Flag of SK Slavia Prague.

The club's colours, red and white, were chosen as standing for the heart and blood, and fair play and sportsmanship respectively. The inverted five-pointed star was intended to symbolise "new hope, forever strengthening the mind and uplifting the spirit." The name "Slavia" is a Latin term used in older literature to denote the lands inhabited by Slavs.

== Supporters and rivalries ==
Slavia's greatest rivals are Sparta Prague, with whom they contest the Prague derby. A local Vršovice derby is also contested between Slavia and Bohemians 1905, whose stadium is situated a kilometre from Eden.

Slavia is widely misconceived as being a Jewish club among other fans, particularly Sparta fans, and its fans and players are often subjected to anti-semitic abuse. However, the club was not founded by Jews nor did it have any Jewish history. Football historian Vladimír Zapotocký commented in an interview that were this the case, the Nazis would have shut the club down during the wartime occupation, as they did with DFC Prag. The association stems from a friendly match played against West Ham United in 1922, when Slavia insured the match against adverse weather conditions, and the match was later cancelled due to rain. They then agreed with West Ham to play the fixture the next day, while also collecting money from the insurance company for cancelling the fixture. A week later in a Prague derby fixture, Slavia were greeted onto the pitch by chants of "vy židi!" ("you Jews!") from the Sparta fans.

Since 2021, there is a fan coalition with Sportowe Zagłębie (Zagłębie Sosnowiec hooligans).

== Cooperations ==
In May 2018 a strategic cooperation with Chinese club Beijing Sinobo Guoan for both professional and youth level football started. And in 2025 a project Slavia d’Abidjan started in Abidjan, Ivory Coast.

== Players ==
=== Current squad ===
As of 8 November 2026

Note: Flags indicate national team as defined under FIFA eligibility rules; some limited exceptions apply. Players may hold more than one non-FIFA nationality.

No.	Pos.	Nation	Player
1	GK	CZE	Ondřej Kolář
2	DF	CZE	Štěpán Chaloupek
3	DF	CZE	Tomáš Holeš
4	DF	CZE	David Zima
5	DF	NGR	Igoh Ogbu
6	DF	FRA	Ange N'Guessan
8	MF	POL	Oskar Kubiak
10	MF	SLO	Danijel Šturm
13	FW	CZE	Mojmír Chytil
14	DF	NGR	Samuel Isife
15	MF	NGR	Mubarak Suleiman
16	MF	NGR	David Moses
17	MF	CZE	Lukáš Provod

No.	Pos.	Nation	Player
18	FW	CAN	Adonija Ouanda
20	FW	NGR	Emmanuel Ayaosi
22	MF	CIV	Toumani Diakité
23	MF	CZE	Michal Sadílek
26	FW	SVK	Ivan Schranz
27	DF	CZE	Tomáš Vlček
29	GK	UKR	Nazar Domchak
30	MF	POL	Wiktor Nowak
32	MF	CZE	Pavel Kačor
35	GK	CZE	Jakub Markovič
39	DF	CZE	David Jurásek
42	DF	CZE	Mikuláš Konečný
43	DF	CZE	Eliáš Piták

=== Out on loan ===
Note: Flags indicate national team as defined under FIFA eligibility rules; some limited exceptions apply. Players may hold more than one non-FIFA nationality.

No.	Pos.	Nation	Player
—	GK	CZE	Jindřich Staněk (at Al-Hazem)
—	GK	BUL	Aleks Bozhev (at CSKA 1948 Sofia)
—	DF	JPN	Daiki Hashioka (at Mönchengladbach)
—	DF	SEN	Youssoupha Mbodji (at Zulte Waregem)
—	DF	GUI	Sahmkou Camara (at Slovan Bratislava)
—	MF	KEN	Timothy Ouma (at Charlton Athletic)
—	DF	SVK	Dominik Javorček (at Bohemians 1905)
—	FW	CZE	Vasil Kušej (at Slovan Liberec)

No.	Pos.	Nation	Player
—	DF	FRA	Neil Glossoa (at Artis Brno)
—	DF	LBR	Emmanuel Fully (at Artis Brno)
—	MF	GAM	Youssoupha Sanyang (at Artis Brno)
—	DF	CZE	Šimon Slončík (at Slovácko)
—	MF	GAM	Gibril Sosseh (at Slovácko)
—	DF	CZE	Denis Halinský (at Pardubice)
—	MF	CZE	Tomáš Jelínek (at Pardubice)
—	FW	CZE	Samuel Pikolon (at Vlašim)

=== Reserve squad ===

All time best Slavia's eleven selected by fans at the 125th club anniversary

The club's reserve team, SK Slavia Prague B, plays in the Czech National Football League (second tier). The second reserve team, SK Slavia Prague C, plays in the Bohemian Football League.

=== Notable former players ===
The best known Slavia player of all time is perhaps forward Josef "Pepi" Bican, one of the most prolific goalscorers in the history of football. Other famous players include forward Antonín Puč, goalkeeper František Plánička (both of them members of the Czechoslovakia national team in two World Cups) and midfielder František Veselý. Other big names in club history are Karel Jarolím, Ivo Knoflíček, Vladimír Šmicer, Karel Poborský, Patrik Berger, Vladimír Coufal and Tomáš Souček.

== Player records in the Czech First League ==
As of 18 September 2026.

=== Most appearances ===
#	Name	Matches
1	(Czech Republic) Milan Škoda	216
2	(Czech Republic) Jan Bořil	210
3	(Czech Republic) David Hubáček	199
4	(Czech Republic) Radek Černý	193
5	(Czech Republic) Jaromír Zmrhal	187
6	(Czech Republic) Karel Piták	176
7	(Czech Republic) Jiří Lerch	175
7	(Czech Republic) Lukáš Provod	175
9	(Czech Republic) Tomáš Holeš	173
10	(Czech Republic) Stanislav Vlček	168

=== Most goals ===
#	Name	Goals
1	(Czech Republic) Milan Škoda	77
2	(Czech Republic) Stanislav Vlček	44
3	(Czech Republic) Mojmír Chytil	42
4	(Czech Republic) Tomáš Došek	40
4	(Czech Republic) Václav Jurečka	40
6	(Czech Republic) Robert Vágner	38
6	(Czech Republic) Pavel Kuka	38
8	(Czech Republic) Karel Piták	34
8	(Czech Republic) Tomáš Chorý	34
10	(Nigeria) Peter Olayinka	33

=== Most clean sheets ===
#	Name	Clean sheets
1	(Czech Republic) Radek Černý	86
2	(Czech Republic) Ondřej Kolář	80
3	(Czech Republic) Jan Stejskal	42
4	(Czech Republic) Martin Vaniak	39

== Ownership and finances ==
Under the Czech jurisdiction the club's legal form is a joint-stock company (updated 1 August 2020) with the largest shareholder being the Chinese real estate Sinobo Group, which has on 11 November 2018 purchased a majority stake from CITIC, at the time holding 99.98% of the 212,074 stocks worth of CZK 1.514 billion (Annual report from 30 June 2018). CITIC remains to be a minority shareholder and the companies did not reveal the distribution of the shares.

According to their chairman Jinhui Zhou, the Sinobo business model is a combination of real estate development and sports activities. In a similar business model, Sinobo owns 64% of the shares in the Chinese club Beijing Guoan where the 36% minority belongs to CITIC. Sinobo also holds the naming rights of the arena, the Sinobo Stadium.

The Chinese investment activity in Slavia has firstly started in September 2005, when a private conglomerate CEFC acquired 59.97% shares of the club through its Czech subsidiary CEFC Group (Europe) Company a.s. from Aleš Řebíček for CZK 27 million. Through the course of the years, the share has increased to 67% and 80%, and on 22 November 2016 CEFC has capitalised its loan into the equity and increased their shares to 99.96% which made them the sole owner. In early 2018, it turned out that CEFC had serious financial problems and CITIC bought the club and arena. In late 2018, CITIC transferred Slavia's majority stake to the Chinese company Sinobo Group.

Slavia's financial results for the 2017–18 season show group revenue of CZK 837.4 million, with a profit before tax of CZK <366.7> million.

Financial data in CZK millions
Year	2020-21	2019-20	2018-19	2017–18	2016–17	2015–16	2014–15
Revenue			942.133	837.390	430.070	204.806	137.909
Net Income		156.0	<219.208>	<366.376>	<263.442>	<117.099>	<61.503>
Assets			1,024.278	605.796	610.835	386.571	211.416
Employees			114	108	125	115	118

== Management ==
The club's current manager is Jindřich Trpišovský since December 2017

The club's current manager is Jindřich Trpišovský, who joined the club in December 2017 from Slovan Liberec. He replaced Jaroslav Šilhavý, who was appointed in September 2016 and moved on to manage the Czech national team. There have been 65 managers in Slavia's history. The club's first professional coach, Johnny Madden, was appointed in 1905, serving in that position until 1930. He remains the club's longest-serving coach in terms of both length of tenure and number of games overseen.

- Head Coach: Jindřich Trpišovský
- Assistant Coach: Milan Kerbr
- Assistant Coach: Zdeněk Houštecký
- Assistant Coach: Pavel Řehák
- Goalkeeper Coach: Štěpán Kolář
- Goalkeeper Coach: Radek Černý
- Fitness Coach: Martin Třasák
- Fitness Coach: Aleš Píta

Managerial record of Jindřich Trpišovský in Slavia
From	To	Record							
From	To	G	W	D	L	GF	GA	GD	Win %
22 Dec 2017	As of match played 15 July 2020	84	60	15	9	171	50	+121	71.43

=== Former coaches ===
Only competitive matches are counted.

- Johnny Madden (1905–30)
- Josef Štaplík (1930–33)
- Kálmán Konrád (1933–35)
- Jan Reichardt (1935–38)
- Emil Seifert (1939–46)
- Josef Pojar (1946–47)
- Viliam König (1947–48)
- Jan Reichardt (1949)
- Viliam König (1950–51)
- Emil Seifert (1952–53)
- Josef Bican (1954–56)
- Antonín Rýgr (1956–58)
- Josef Forejt (1958)
- Antonín Rýgr (1959)
- Vlastimil Kopecký (1959)
- Karel Finek (1959–60)
- Josef Forejt (1960)
- Antonín Rýgr (1960–63)
- Karel Finek (1963–64)
- František Ipser (1964–66)
- Vratislav Fikejz (1966)
- Mirko Paráček (1966)
- František Havránek (1966–68)
- Jiří Nedvídek (1968–69)
- Josef Forejt (1969–70)
- Antonín Rýgr (1970–72)
- Miroslav Linhart (1972)
- Rudolf Vytlačil (1973)
- Jaroslav Jareš (1973–79)
- Bohumil Musil (1979–80)
- Josef Bouška (1981)
- Miroslav Starý (1981)
- Milan Máčala (1982–84)
- Jaroslav Jareš (1984–86)
- Vlastimil Petržela (1986–87)
- Tomáš Pospíchal (1987–88)
- Ivan Kopecký (1988–89)
- Vlastimil Petržela (1990–92)
- Jozef Jarabinský (1992–93)
- Jindřich Dejmal (1993–94)
- Miroslav Beránek (1994–95)
- František Cipro (1995–97)
- Pavel Tobiáš (1997–98)
- Petr Rada (1998)
- Jaroslav Hřebík (1998–99)
- František Cipro (1999–00)
- Karel Jarolím (2000–01)
- Josef Pešice (2001)
- Miroslav Beránek (2001–03)
- Josef Csaplár (Jan 04 – Apr 05)
- Karel Jarolím (Jul 05 – Mar 10)
- František Cipro (Mar 10 – May 10)
- Karel Jarolím (Jul 10 – Sep 10)
- Michal Petrouš (Sep 10 – Oct 11)
- František Straka (Oct 11 – Mar 12)
- Martin Poustka (Mar 12 – Jun 12)
- Petr Rada (Jul 12 – Apr 13)
- Michal Petrouš (Apr 13 – Sep 13)
- Miroslav Koubek (Sep 13 – Mar 14)
- Alex Pastoor (Mar 14 – May 14)
- Miroslav Beránek (Jun 14 – Jun 15)
- Dušan Uhrin Jr. (Jun 15 – Aug 16)
- Jaroslav Šilhavý (Sep 16 – Dec 17)
- Jindřich Trpišovský (Dec 2017 – present)

== Honours ==
Type	Competition	Titles	Seasons
Domestic leagues	Czech First League	9	1995–96, 2007–08, 2008–09, 2016–17, 2018–19, 2019–20, 2020–21, 2024–25, 2025–26
Domestic leagues	Czechoslovak First League	13	1925, 1928–29, 1929–30, 1930–31, 1932–33, 1933–34, 1934–35, 1936–37, 1939–40, 1940–41, 1941–42, 1942–43, 1946–47
Domestic leagues	Bohemian Football Union Championship	1	1913
League titles not counted by Czech FA	Czech Championship	10	spring of 1897, fall of 1897, 1898, 1899, 1900, 1901, 1915, 1918, 1924, 1948
Domestic cups	Czech Cup	7	1996–97, 1998–99, 2001–02, 2017–18, 2018–19, 2020–21, 2022–23
Domestic cups	Czechoslovak Cup	2	1940–41, 1941–42
Domestic cups	Czech-Slovak Supercup	1	2019
Domestic cups not counted by Czech FA	Charity Cup	4	1908, 1910, 1911, 1912
Domestic cups not counted by Czech FA	Central Bohemian Cup	8	1922, 1925–26, 1927, 1927–28, 1929–30, 1931–32, 1934–35, 1940–41
Domestic cups not counted by Czech FA	Liberty Cup	1	1945
Continental	Mitropa Cup	1	1938

== In European football ==
=== Progress in UEFA competitions ===
Accurate as of 26 October 2023

Competition	Pld	W	D	L	GF	GA	GD	W%
UEFA Champions League	46	13	12	21	34	63	−29	28.26
UEFA Cup Winners' Cup	8	3	3	2	11	9	+2	37.50
UEFA Cup / UEFA Europa League	150	56	40	54	194	178	+16	37.33
UEFA Europa Conference League	25	12	6	7	52	32	+20	48.00
Total	229	84	61	84	291	282	+9	36.68

== Club records ==
- Biggest win: Fenerbahçe 1–10 Slavia Prague (1923)

=== Czech First League records ===
- Best position: 1st (1995–96, 2007–08, 2008–09, 2016–17, 2018–19, 2019–20, 2020–21, 2024–25)
- Worst position: 13th (2013–14)
- Biggest home win: Slavia Prague 9–1 Slovácká Slavia Uherské Hradiště (1995–96)
- Biggest away win: Příbram 1–8 Slavia Prague (2016–17)
- Biggest home defeat: Slavia Prague 0–7 Teplice (2013–14)
- Biggest away defeat: Ostrava 5–0 Slavia Prague (1998–99)
