= Deaths in May 1998 =

The following is a list of notable deaths in May 1998.

Entries for each day are listed alphabetically by surname. A typical entry lists information in the following sequence:

- Name, age, country of citizenship at birth, subsequent country of citizenship (if applicable), reason for notability, cause of death (if known), and reference.

== May 1998 ==
=== 1 ===
- Eldridge Cleaver, 62, American writer and political activist, prostate cancer.
- Heinie Heltzel, 84, American baseball player (Boston Braves, Philadelphia Phillies).
- Daniel Henry Huyett III, 76, American district judge (United States District Court for the Eastern District of Pennsylvania).
- Brian Kendall, 51, New Zealand boxer, cancer.
- J. S. Roskell, 84, English historian of the Middle Ages.
- Jozef Schoeters, 50, Belgian Olympic cyclist (1968).

=== 2 ===
- Clyde Connell, 96, American abstract expressionist sculptor.
- Justin Fashanu, 37, English footballer, suicide by hanging.
- Johnny Grodzicki, 81, American baseball player (St. Louis Cardinals).
- Hide, 33, Japanese musician, suicide by hanging.
- Kevin Lloyd, 49, English actor (The Bill), alcoholism.
- Maidie Norman, 85, American actress and literature and theater teacher, lung cancer.
- Charlie Thomason, 79, American baseball player.
- Carey Wilber, 81, American journalist and television writer.

=== 3 ===
- Jesse Alto, 71, American poker player.
- Erich Bergel, 67, German flutist and conductor.
- Louis Berry, 83, African American civil rights attorney.
- Erika Cheetham, 58, English writer.
- Johannes Driessler, 77, German composer, organist, and lecturer.
- Tom Elliot, 72, Scottish rugby player.
- Jean-Baptiste Hachème, 68, Beninese military officer and politician.
- Raimund Harmstorf, 58, German actor, suicide by hanging.
- David Vincent Hooper, 82, British chess player and writer.
- Venkatesh Kulkarni, Indian-American novelist and academic, leukemia.
- Loren MacIver, 89, American painter.
- Luiz Martins, 83, Brazilian Olympic sports shooter (1960).
- René Mugica, 88, Argentine actor, film director and screenwriter.
- Gene Raymond, 89, American actor, pneumonia.
- Tom Robertson, 80, American football player (Brooklyn Dodgers, New York Yankees).
- Les Samuels, 69, English footballer.
- Xue Yue, 101, Chinese Nationalist military general.
- Gojko Šušak, 53, Croatian politician, lung cancer.

=== 4 ===
- Gordon Beningfield, 61, English wildlife artist, broadcaster and naturalist.
- Henryk Bobula, 78, Polish footballer.
- Alois Estermann, 43, Swiss officer of the Pontifical Swiss Guard, shot.
- Sam Gentile, 81, American baseball player (Boston Braves).
- Albert Glasser, 82, American composer, conductor and arranger of B-movie music.
- Christine Kurzhals, 47, German politician.
- Magda Lenkei, 81, Hungarian swimmer and Olympian (1936).
- Theodor Oberländer, 93, German Ostforschung scientist and politician.
- José Olguín, 71, Mexican Olympic water polo player (1948).
- Bruce Peever, 66, Australian pole vaulter and Olympian (1956).
- Nicolò Rode, 86, Italian sailor and Olympic champion (1948, 1952, 1956).

=== 5 ===
- Juan Gimeno, 84, Spanish road cyclist.
- Alan Glyn, 79, British politician.
- Henrik Hellén, 58, Finnish Olympic high jumper (1964).
- Tommy McCook, 71, Jamaican saxophonist, pneumonia and heart failure.
- Eleanor Ragsdale, 72, American civil rights activist.
- Frithjof Schuon, 90, Swiss author, poet and painter.
- Paul Seymour, 70, American basketball player (Baltimore Bullets, Syracuse Nationals), and coach.
- Herb Turner, 87, Australian rower and Olympian (1936).

=== 6 ===
- Axel Bloch, 87, Danish Olympic fencer (1932).
- Chatchai Chunhawan, 78, Thai army officer, diplomat and politician, liver cancer.
- Sybil Connolly, 77, Irish fashion designer.
- Juan Antonio García Díez, 57, American politician, liver cancer.
- Aleksei Gritsai, 84, Soviet and Russian artist.
- John Joseph, 65, Pakistani Roman Catholic bishop, suicide by gunshot.
- Arvid Laurin, 96, Swedish sailor and Olympic medalist (1936).
- Erich Mende, 81, German politician, Vice-Chancellor of West Germany.

=== 7 ===
- Blue Lu Barker, 84, American jazz and blues singer.
- Allan McLeod Cormack, 74, South African American physicist, cancer.
- István Hasznos, 73, Hungarian water polo player and Olympic champion (1952).
- Jack Heslop-Harrison, 78, British soldier and botanist, heart attack.
- Junie Hovious, 78, American football player (New York Giants).
- John Meyers, 58, American football player (Dallas Cowboys, Philadelphia Eagles), heart problems.
- Eddie Rabbitt, 56, American singer and songwriter, lung cancer.
- Allen Wikgren, 91, American theologian and New Testament scholar.

=== 8 ===
- Donald Stephen Lowell Cardwell, 78, British historian of science and technology.
- Jacques Dumesnil, 94, French film and television actor.
- Otto Jung, 67, Argentine Olympic alpine skier (1948, 1952).
- Johannes Kotkas, 83, Estonian Greco-Roman wrestler and Olympic champion (1952).
- Ray Noble, 79, Cuban baseball player (New York Giants).
- Brian Pfaff, 68, South African sportsman.
- Raymond Premru, 63, American trombonist and compose, esophageal cancer.
- Jennings Randolph, 96, American politician.
- Charles Rebozo, 85, American banker and businessman.

=== 9 ===
- Lester Butler, 38, American blues harmonica player and singer, drug overdose.
- Frithjof Clausen, 82, Norwegian wrestler and Olympian (1948, 1952).
- Donald Conroy, 77, United States Marine Corps colonel.
- Bernard Dwork, 74, American mathematician.
- Alice Faye, 83, American actress and singer, stomach cancer.
- Rudolf Ismayr, 89, German weightlifter and Olympic champion (1932, 1936).
- Rommie Loudd, 64, American gridiron football player (Los Angeles Chargers, Boston Patriots), coach, and executive, diabetes.
- Talat Mahmood, 74, Indian playback singer, heart attack.
- Bob Mellish, Baron Mellish, 85, British politician.
- Tom Neville, 36, American football player (Green Bay Packers, San Francisco 49ers).
- Earl R. Parker, 85, American engineer and professor.
- Nat Perrin, 93, American comedy screenwriter, producer and director.
- R. J. G. Savage, 70, British palaeontologist, pancreatic cancer.
- Gerhard Siedl, 69, German football player.
- Marianne Strengell, 88, Finnish-American modernist textile designer.

=== 10 ===
- Ricardo Capanema, 64, Brazilian swimmer and Olympian (1952).
- Lajos Czinege, 74, Hungarian military officer and politician.
- José Francisco Antonio Peña Gómez, 61, Dominican Republic politician, pulmonary edema.
- Robert Jewell, 78, Australian actor (Doctor Who).
- Oreste Kirkop, 74, Maltese singer.
- Ken McKenzie, 71, Australian rugby league footballer.
- Enrique Molina, 78, Argentine Olympic cyclist (1948).
- Cesare Perdisa, 65, Italian racing driver.
- Ronald Ridenhour, 52, American soldier during the Vietnam War, heart attack.
- Clara Rockmore, 87, American classical violin prodigy and theremin performer.
- Sumitro, 71, Indonesian general.
- Alberto Valdés, 80, Mexican American painter
- George Wright, 77, American organist.

=== 11 ===
- Willy Corsari, 100, Dutch actor, author and composer.
- Gene Fowler Jr., 80, American film editor (It's a Mad, Mad, Mad, Mad World, Hang 'Em High).
- Ernst Ising, 98, German physicist.
- John Morrison, 94, Australian novelist and short story writer.
- Antonio Quistelli, 48, Italian Olympic wrestler (1976).
- Hans van Zon, 56, Dutch serial killer, alcohol poisoning.

=== 12 ===
- Ulf Berendt, 67, Swedish Olympic figure skater (1952).
- Myoung Hwa Cho, 44, American murder victim, homicide by asphyxiation.
- Hermann Lenz, 85, German writer, poet, and novelist.
- John McCarthy, 81, American gridiron football player (Card-Pitt).
- Graham Shaw, 63, English football player.

=== 13 ===
- Gunnar Jansson, 90, Swedish football player.
- Oscar G. Johnson, 77, United States Army soldier and recipient of the Medal of Honor.
- Chantal Mauduit, 34, French alpinist, climbing accident.
- Uolevi Raade, 85, Finnish industrialist.
- Frank Ragano, 75, American mafia lawyer.

=== 14 ===
- Mabel Esther Allan, 83, British children's author.
- Bill Bishop, 67, American gridiron football player (Chicago Bears, Minnesota Vikings).
- Garth Boesch, 77, Canadian ice hockey player (Toronto Maple Leafs).
- Tom D'Andrea, 88, American actor.
- Marjory Stoneman Douglas, 108, American journalist, writer and conservationist.
- Charlie Hall, 50, American gridiron football player (Green Bay Packers).
- Geoffrey Kendal, 88, English actor.
- Floyd Lounsbury, 84, American linguist, anthropologist and epigrapher.
- George McAvoy, 66, Canadian ice hockey player (Montreal Canadiens).
- Yitzhak Moda'i, 72, Israeli politician.
- Shawkat Osman, 81, Bangladeshi novelist and short story writer.
- Jack Salscheider, 73, American football player (New York Giants).
- Karl Schmid, 87, Swiss rower and Olympic medalist (1936).
- Frank Sinatra, 82, American singer ("My Way", "That's Life") and actor (From Here to Eternity), Oscar winner (1954), heart attack.
- Bill Sodd, 83, American baseball player (Cleveland Indians).
- Mahmud of Terengganu, 68, Malaysian sultan.
- Jade Wilson, 21, New Zealand squash player, suicide.

=== 15 ===
- Rudolfs Baumanis, 88, Latvian Olympic sports shooter (1936).
- Alan Cain, 75, Australian Olympic sailor (1960).
- Joe Cibulas, 77, American football player (Pittsburgh Steelers).
- Gunter d'Alquen, 87, German nazi correspondent.
- Marcel Fillion, 75, Canadian ice hockey player (Boston Bruins).
- John Hawkes, 72, American novelist.
- Richard Jaeger, 85, German politician.
- Earl Manigault, 53, American basketball player, congestive heart failure.
- Packy Rogers, 85, American baseball player (Brooklyn Dodgers), manager and scout.
- Naim Talu, 78, Turkish politician and former Prime Minister of Turkey.
- Patrick Wall, 81, British commando during World War II and later a politician.

=== 16 ===
- Pierre Cardinal, 73, French screenwriter and director.
- Idov Cohen, 88, Romanian-Israeli politician and journalist.
- Milan Creighton, 90, American football player and coach (Chicago Cardinals).
- William Alexander Hewitt, 83, American diplomat and businessman.
- Rufino Linares, 47, American baseball player (Atlanta Braves, California Angels), traffic collision.

=== 17 ===
- Genie Chance, 71, American journalist, radio broadcaster and politician.
- Hugh Cudlipp, 84, British journalist and newspaper editor.
- Nina Dorliak, 89, Russian soprano and a voice teacher.
- Gasper Urban, 75, American gridiron football player (Chicago Rockets).
- Sarojini Yogeswaran, 97, Sri Lankan politician.

=== 18 ===
- Obaidullah Aleem, Indian poet, heart failure.
- Odd Engström, 56, Swedish politician, heart attack.
- Roy Evans, 88, Welsh table tennis player.
- Enid Marx, 95, English painter and designer.
- Dal Bahadur Ranamagar, 36, Nepalese Olympic boxer (1984, 1988).

=== 19 ===
- Edwin Astley, 76, British composer.
- Hank Earl Carr, 30, American murderer and spree killer, suicide by gunshot.
- László Decker, 75, Hungarian Olympic rower (1952).
- Leela Devi, 66, Indian writer, translator, and teacher.
- Dorothy Donegan, 76, American jazz pianist and vocalist, cancer.
- Teresa Prekerowa, 76, Polish historian and author.
- Bello Snyder, 86, American basketball player.
- Riccardo Steinleitner, 83, Italian Olympic rower (1936).
- Sōsuke Uno, 75, Japanese politician and Prime Minister of Japan, lung cancer.

=== 20 ===
- Chuck Bloedorn, 85, American basketball player.
- Tom Bolack, 80, American businessman and politician.
- Linwood G. Dunn, 93, American visual effects artist (West Side Story, It's a Mad, Mad, Mad, Mad World, Mighty Joe Young).
- Ricardo Franco, 48, Spanish screenwriter and film director, heart attack.
- Thomas Fraser, 80, New Zealand cricketer.
- George F. Gunn Jr., 70, American district judge (United States District Court for the Eastern District of Missouri).
- Jacob Katz, 93, Israeli historian and educator.
- Wolf Mankowitz, 73, English writer, playwright and screenwriter, cancer.
- Walter McKinnon, 87, New Zealand Army officer.
- Robert Normann, 81, Norwegian jazz guitarist.
- Alfredo Yabrán, 53, Argentine businessman and associate of Carlos Menem, suicide by gunshot.
- Santiago Álvarez, 79, Cuban filmmaker, Parkinson's disease.

=== 21 ===
- Erik Bladström, 80, Swedish sprint canoeist and Olympic champion (1936).
- Li Bo, 69, Chinese ecologist, traffic collision.
- Pedro Escartín, 95, Spanish football player, referee, coach, and author.
- Douglas Fowley, 86, American actor (Singin' in the Rain, The Life and Legend of Wyatt Earp, Mighty Joe Young).
- Robert Gist, 80, American actor and film director.
- Jan Gullberg, 62, Swedish surgeon and science writer, stroke.
- Tibor Oross, 38, Hungarian handball player and Olympian (1988).
- Jim Power, 102, Irish hurler.
- Rajanala, 73, Indian film actor.
- Torgny Säve-Söderbergh, 83, Swedish writer and professor of Egyptology.

=== 22 ===
- Domenico Cantatore, 82, Italian painter.
- John Derek, 71, American actor (All the King's Men, The Ten Commandments) and film director (Tarzan, the Ape Man), heart failure.
- Arthur R. Gralla, 85, United States Navy Vice Admiral, pneumonia.
- Fred Hatfield, 73, American baseball player.
- Eddie MacCabe, 71, Canadian sports journalist and writer.
- Robert W. Morgan, 60, American radio personality, lung cancer.
- José Enrique Moyal, 87, Australian mathematical physicist.
- Francisco Lucas Pires, 53, Portuguese lawyer, and politician.
- Jack Watkins, 74, American basketball player.

=== 23 ===
- Akiel Chambers, 11, Trinidadian murder victim.
- Jacques Dietrichstein, 91, Austrian ice hockey player and Olympian (1928).
- Tony Halik, 77, Polish documentary film maker, author of travel books, and explorer.
- Grace Hartman, Canadian social activist and politician.
- Vic Kulbitski, 76, American gridiron football player (Buffalo Bisons/Bills).
- Andreas Liebenberg, 60, South African military commander.
- Ebbe Rode, 88, Danish stage and film actor, pneumonia.
- Monroe K. Spears, American university professor and literary critic.
- Telford Taylor, 90, American lawyer.

=== 24 ===
- Francys Arsentiev, 40, American mountaineer, hypothermia and/or cerebral edema.
- Ľudovít Dubovský, 79, Slovak footballer.
- George Kelly, 82, American jazz tenor saxophonist.
- Tommy Moore, 35, American golfer, primary amyloidosis.
- Premnath Moraes, 75, Sri Lankan actor, film director and scriptwriter.
- Lucio Muñoz, 68, Spanish painter and engraver.
- Charles Rycroft, 83, British psychiatrist and psychoanalyst.

=== 25 ===
- Steve Michael, 42, American HIV/AIDS activist, complications from AIDS.
- Gary Thomas Row, 64, American informant for the FBI, heart attack.
- Claude Stubbs, 93, Australian politician.
- Todd Witsken, 34, American tennis player, brain cancer.

=== 26 ===
- Emil Braginsky, 76, Soviet and Russian screenwriter.
- Linda Hayes, 74, American rhythm and blues singer.
- Edgar A. Silinsh, 71, Soviet and Latvian scientist.
- Charlie White, 70, American baseball player (Milwaukee Braves).
- Sergey Yablonsky, 73, Soviet and Russian mathematician.

=== 27 ===
- Minoo Masani, 92, Indian politician.
- Robert Muller, 72, German-British journalist and screenwriter.
- Ghazaros Saryan, 77, Armenian composer.
- Shu Tong, 92, Chinese politician.

=== 28 ===
- Chung-Yao Chao, 95, Chinese theoretical physicist.
- Ragnar Fjørtoft, 84, Norwegian meteorologist.
- Bill Giles, 66, American football player and coach.
- Cyril Harrison, 82, English cricketer.
- Phil Hartman, 49, Canadian-American comedian and actor (Saturday Night Live, NewsRadio, The Simpsons), Emmy winner (1989), shot.
- Anatoliy Kabayda, 85, Ukrainian community and political activist.
- Bill Meek, 77, American football player and coach.
- Lana Morris, 68, British actress, heart attack.
- George T. Oubre, 80, American politician.
- Dieter Renner, 48, German football player and coach.
- Giovanni Valetti, 84, Italian road racing cyclist.
- Bill Williams, 37, American game designer, programmer and author, cystic fibrosis.

=== 29 ===
- Orlando Anderson, 23, American gangster and suspected murderer of rapper Tupac Shakur, shot.
- Eric Atkinson, 70, Barbados cricket player.
- Ted Dunbar, 61, American jazz guitarist and composer, stroke.
- Barry Goldwater, 89, American politician and author, complications from a stroke.
- Hazel P. Heath, 88, American politician and entrepreneur.
- Marion Milner, 98, British author and psychoanalyst.
- Philip O'Connor, 81, British writer and surrealist poet.

=== 30 ===
- Sam Aaronovitch, 78, British economist, academic and communist.
- Anatoly Badrankov, 57, Soviet Kazakh Olympic long-distance runner (1972).
- Jozef Baláži, 78, Slovak football player and manager.
- Leon Bender, 22, American football player, epilepsy.
- Walter Carr, 73, Scottish actor and comedian.
- William Moreton Condry, 80, English naturalist, kidney failure.
- Robin Jackson, 49, Northern Irish loyalist paramilitary, lung cancer.
- Jan Pickard, 70, South African rugby player.
- Max Prieto, 79, Mexican football player.
- Wolfram Röhrig, 81, German pianist, composer and conductor.

=== 31 ===
- Sammy Collins, 75, English football player.
- Lotti Huber, 85, German actress.
- Valeriy Hubulov, 31, South Ossetian politician, shot.
- Walter de Paula, 82, Brazilian Olympic fencer (1948, 1952).
- Michio Suzuki, 71, Japanese mathematician.
- Charles Van Acker, 86, Belgian-American racecar driver.
- Stanisław Wisłocki, 76, Polish conductor of classical music.
