= Petro =

Petro is a masculine given name, a surname and an Ancient Roman cognomen. It may refer to:

== Given name ==
- Petro Balabuyev (1931–2007), Ukrainian airplane designer, engineer and professor, lead designer of many Antonov airplanes
- Petro Doroshenko (1627–1698), Cossack political and military leader, Hetman of Right-bank Ukraine (1665–1672) and a Russian voyevoda (governor)
- Petro Drevchenko (1863–1934), Ukrainian bandurist
- Petro Dyachenko (1895–1965), Ukrainian military commander
- Petro Dyminskyi (born 1954), Ukrainian politician, businessman and former footballer
- Petro Franko (1890–1941), Ukrainian educator and author
- Petro Georgiou (1947–2025), Australian politician
- Petro Goga, Chairman of the Constituent Assembly of Albania in 1924
- Petro Hermanchuk (1952–2012), Ukrainian economist and politician
- Petro Kalnyshevsky (1691?–1803), last Koshovyi Otaman of the Zaporozhian Host (in what is now Ukraine)
- Petro Kharchenko (born 1983), Ukrainian former pair ice skater
- Petro Kasui Kibe (1587–1639), Japanese Christian missionary, Jesuit priest and martyr
- Petro Konashevych-Sahaidachny (1570-1622), political and civic leader
- Petro Kondratyuk (born 1979), Ukrainian former footballer
- Petro Korol (1941–2015), Ukrainian weightlifter and 1976 Olympic champion
- Petro Nini Luarasi (1864-1911), Albanian nationalist, Christian orthodox priest, teacher and journalist
- Petro Herkulan Malchuk (1965-2016), Ukrainian Roman Catholic Archbishop of Kyiv-Zhytomyr
- Petro Marko (1913–1991), Albanian writer
- Petro Mirchuk (1913–1999), Ukrainian writer
- Petro Nishchynsky (1832–1896), Ukrainian linguist and composer
- Petro Pakhnyuk (born 1991), Ukrainian (until 2014) and Azerbaijani (since 2014) artistic gymnast
- Petro Pereverza (born 1994), Ukrainian footballer
- Petro Poga (1850-1944), Albanian nationalist, one of the delegates at the Albanian Declaration of Independence
- Petro Poroshenko (born 1965), Ukrainian businessman and politician
- Petro Prokopovych (1775–1850), the founder of commercial beekeeping
- Petro Punna, Finnish former footballer and executive
- Petro Shelest (1908–1996), First Secretary of the Communist party in the Ukrainian Soviet Socialist Republic and member of the Politburo of the Communist Party of the Soviet Union
- Petro Slobodyan (1953–2020), Soviet retired footballer and current Ukrainian coach
- Petro Symonenko (born 1952), Ukrainian politician and First Secretary of the Central Committee of the Communist Party of Ukraine
- Petro Tkachenko (1878-1919), Ukrainian blind kobzar (musician)
- Petro Trad (1876–1947), Lebanese lawyer, politician and briefly President of the French Mandate of Lebanon in 1943
- Petro Trochanowski (born 1947), Polish poet
- Petro Vlahos (1916–2013), Hollywood special effects pioneer
- Petro Voinovsky (1913—1996), Ukrainian nationalist
- Petro Zakhvalynsky (died 1943), Ukrainian nationalist

== Surname ==
- Charles Petro (born 2001), Malawian footballer
- Gustavo Petro (born 1960), President of Colombia from 2022 to 2026, politician and economist
- Jim Petro (born 1948), American politician and former Ohio Attorney General
- Johan Petro (born 1986), French professional basketball player
- Joe Petro III (born 1956), American artist
- Joseph Petro (born 1944), former United States Secret Service agent, Executive Vice President and Managing Director of Citigroup Security and Investigative Services
- Pamela Petro, American artist
- Nicolai N. Petro, American political science scholar
- Steve Petro (1914–1994), American National Football League player

== Cognomen ==
- Titus Flavius Petro (fl. 1st century BC), paternal grandfather of the Roman Emperor Vespasian

== Other ==
- Petro (cryptocurrency), Venezuelan cryptocurrency
- Petro lwa or Petwo, a family of lwa (loa) in Voudon (Voodoo)
- Petros (disambiguation)
- Petroleum
