= Gullberg =

Gullberg may refer to:

- Hjalmar Gullberg (1898–1961), Swedish writer and poet
- Jan Gullberg (1936–1998), Swedish popular-science writer
- Gullberg fortress (1253–1687), in presentday Gothenburg
- Gullberg Hundred, a Swedish hundred

== See also ==
- Gulberg
