= ŠK Slovan Bratislava statistics and records =

Several players for the Slovak football team ŠK Slovan Bratislava have been outstanding, in terms of goalscoring or in terms of appearances for the Slovak or Czechoslovak national teams.

== Most goals ==
- Jozef Adamec 170
- Emil Pažický 123
- Anton Moravčík 109
- Marián Masný 103
- Ján Čapkovič 100

== Best scorers ==
- Emil Pažický 19 (1954/55)
- Ján Čapkovič 19 (1971/72)
- Marián Masný 16 (1980/81)
- Peter Dubovský 22 (1991/92), 23 (1992/93)
- Pavol Masaryk 15 (2008/09)

== Most matches in national team ==
- Marián Masný 75
- Róbert Vittek 74
- Ján Popluhár 62
- Szilárd Németh 59
- Anton Ondruš 58
