= UEFA Euro 1972 qualifying Group 1 =

Football tournament qualification stage

Group 1 of the UEFA Euro 1972 qualifying tournament was one of the eight groups to decide which teams would qualify for the UEFA Euro 1972 finals tournament. Group 1 consisted of four teams: Romania, Czechoslovakia, Wales, and Finland, where they played against each other home-and-away in a round-robin format. The group winners were Romania, who finished above Czechoslovakia on goal difference.

== Final table ==
Pos	Team	Pld	W	D	L	GF	GA	GD	Pts	Qualification	(Romania)	(Czechoslovakia)	(Wales)	(Finland)
1	Romania	6	4	1	1	11	2	+9	9	Advance to quarter-finals	—	2–1	2–0	3–0
2	Czechoslovakia	6	4	1	1	11	4	+7	9		1–0	—	1–0	1–1
3	Wales	6	2	1	3	5	6	−1	5		0–0	1–3	—	3–0
4	Finland	6	0	1	5	1	16	−15	1		0–4	0–4	0–1	—

Source: UEFA
Rules for classification: Qualification tiebreakers

== Matches ==
7 October 1970
18:00

Czechoslovakia	1–1	Finland
Albrecht 30'	Report	Paatelainen 41'

Letenský stadion, Prague
Attendance: 5,549
Referee: William O'Neill (Northern Ireland)

11 October 1970
15:30

Romania	3–0	Finland
Dumitrache 28', 42'; Nunweiller 77'	Report

Stadionul 23. August, Bucharest
Attendance: 36,584
Referee: Leonidas Vamvakopoulos (Greece)

11 November 1970
16:30

Wales	0–0	Romania
	Report

Ninian Park, Cardiff
Attendance: 19,882
Referee: Arie van Gemert (Netherlands)

21 April 1971
19:30

Wales	1–3	Czechoslovakia
R. Davies 49' (pen.)	Report	Čapkovič 80', 83'; Táborský 81'

Vetch Field, Swansea
Attendance: 12,767
Referee: Johan Einar Boström (Sweden)

16 May 1971
17:00

Czechoslovakia	1–0	Romania
Veselý 88'	Report

Tehelné Pole (Slovan), Bratislava
Attendance: 38,207
Referee: Fernando dos Santos Leite (Portugal)

26 May 1971
19:00

Finland	0–1	Wales
	Report	Toshack 54'

Olympiastadion, Helsinki
Attendance: 5,410
Referee: Günter Männig (East Germany)

16 June 1971
19:00

Finland	0–4	Czechoslovakia
	Report	Čapkovič 10'; Pollák 16'; Karkó 83', 89'

Olympiastadion, Helsinki
Attendance: 4,658
Referee: Marian Środecki (Poland)

22 September 1971
18:30

Finland	0–4	Romania
	Report	Iordănescu 25'; Lupescu 37'; Dembrovschi 55'; Lucescu 64' (pen.)

Olympiastadion, Helsinki
Attendance: 2,084
Referee: Pius Kamber (Switzerland)

13 October 1971
19:30

Wales	3–0	Finland
Durban 10'; Toshack 53'; Reece 89'	Report

Vetch Field, Swansea
Attendance: 10,301
Referee: Kaj Rasmussen (Denmark)

27 October 1971
18:00

Czechoslovakia	1–0	Wales
Kuna 60'	Report

Letenský stadion, Prague
Attendance: 20,051
Referee: Mariano Medina Iglesias (Spain)

14 November 1971
14:00

Romania	2–1	Czechoslovakia
Dembrovschi 26'; Dobrin 52'	Report	Čapkovič 50'

Stadionul 23. August, Bucharest
Attendance: 63,583
Referee: Milivoje Gugulović (Yugoslavia)

24 November 1971
14:00

Romania	2–0	Wales
Lupescu 9'; Lucescu 74'	Report

Stadionul 23. August, Bucharest
Attendance: 35,251
Referee: Alfred Delcourt (Belgium)

== Goalscorers ==
There were 28 goals scored in 12 matches, for an average of 2.33 goals per match.

4 goals

- (Czechoslovakia) Ján Čapkovič

2 goals

- (Czechoslovakia) František Karkó
- (Romania) Emerich Dembrovschi
- (Romania) Florea Dumitrache
- (Romania) Mircea Lucescu
- (Romania) Nicolae Lupescu
- (Wales) John Toshack

1 goal

- (Czechoslovakia) Milan Albrecht
- (Czechoslovakia) Ladislav Kuna
- (Czechoslovakia) Jaroslav Pollák
- (Czechoslovakia) Vladimír Táborský
- (Czechoslovakia) František Veselý
- (Finland) Matti Paatelainen
- (Romania) Nicolae Dobrin
- (Romania) Anghel Iordănescu
- (Romania) Radu Nunweiller
- (Wales) Ron Davies
- (Wales) Alan Durban
- (Wales) Gil Reece
