= Gabo Zelenay =

Slovak radio sports commentator, presenter and editor (1922–2003)

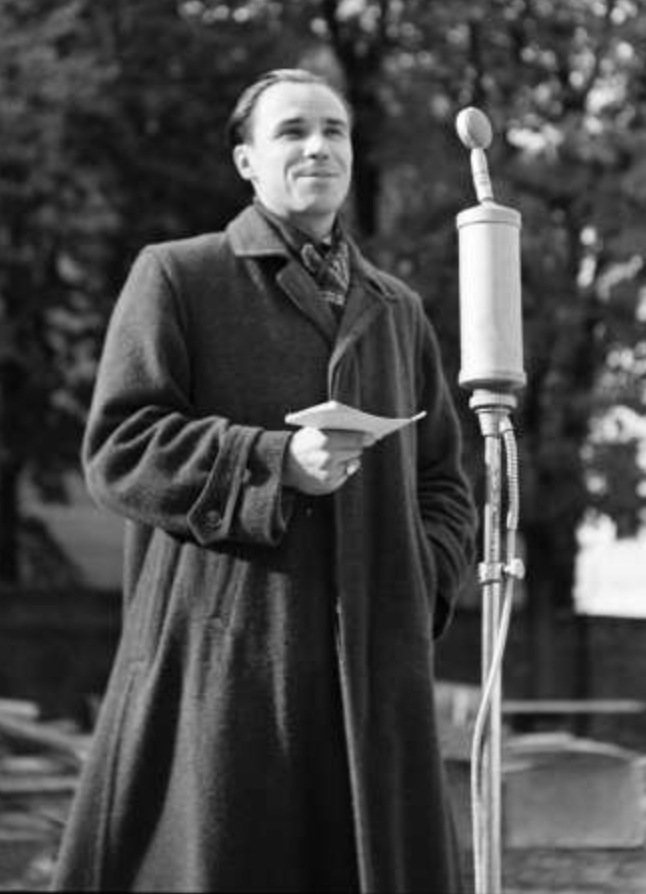
- Zelenay in 1947
- Born: November 26, 1922; Bánovce nad Bebravou, Trenčín Region, Czechoslovakia (now Slovakia)
- Died: August 3, 2003 (aged 80); Bratislava, Slovakia
- Occupations: Radio sports commentator, presenter and editor

Gabo Zelenay (26 November 1922 – 3 August 2003) was a Slovak radio sports commentator, presenter and editor. He was known for his unique way of commenting on matches, for which he later received a Slovak award, the Pribina Cross II class for significant services in the field of sports and journalism.

== Early life ==
In his youth, Zelenay was an active athlete and coach. As a enthusiast of sports, he founded the first girls' basketball team in Slovakia. He also later played ice hockey. After being called up for compulsory military service in 1943, he played as a goalkeeper for OAP Bratislava. After World War II, he played hockey at the University of Bratislava until 1947. Then he worked for a short time as a first-league referee.

== Career ==
Zelenay worked for the Czechoslovak Radio from September 1946, when he successfully auditioned as a sports reporter at the age of 24. He made history mainly due to his unusual, original way of commentating, for which he later received the state decoration Pribina Cross, 2nd class, for significant merits in the field of sports journalism from the President of the Slovak Republic. He commentated on the 1969 European Cup Winners' Cup final in Basel between Slovan Bratislava and FC Barcelona. During the match, Zelenay delivered the slogan " Bieli jastrabi z Tehelného poľa bratislavského" (White Hawks from Tehelné pole Bratislava), referring to the Slovan players who had achieved success in the final. The phrase later became one of the nicknames for the club.

During his career, he mainly reported on football and hockey matches. In addition, he was able to comment on chess and fencing matches, which other reporters considered “uncommentable”.

== Later life ==
Zelenay ended his career at the age of 63 after almost forty years of commentary and moderation, but he continued to be active as an editor. He was politically involved in the founding of the HZDS, contributed to the magazine Nový deň bližského HZDS and chaired the Union of Slovak Journalists, which supported the media line of the HZDS.

Zelenay died on Sunday, 3 August 2003 at the age of 80 after a serious illness.
