= Tsarist autocracy =

Form of autocracy specific to Russian monarchies

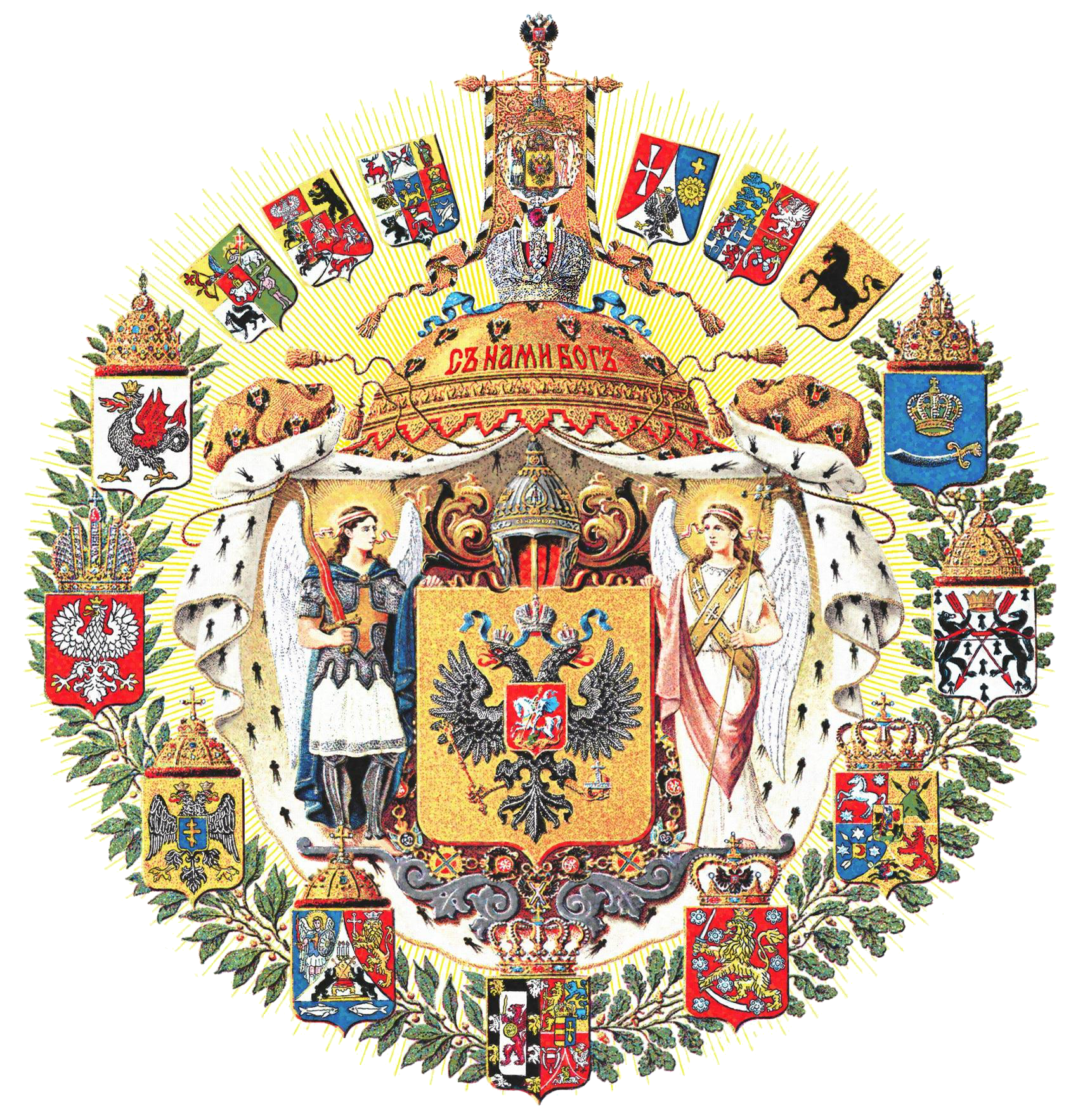
Greater achievement of the Russian Empire C.O.A.

Tsarist autocracy (Russian: царское самодержавие, romanized: tsarskoye samoderzhaviye), also called Tsarism, was an autocracy, a form of absolute monarchy in the Grand Duchy of Moscow and its successor states, the Tsardom of Russia and the Russian Empire, collectively known as Tsarist Russia. In it, the Tsar possessed in principle authority and wealth, with more power than constitutional monarchs counterbalanced by legislative authority, as well as a more religious authority than Western monarchs. The institution originated during the time of Ivan III (1462−1505) and was limited with the introduction of constitution and national-level representative assembly (State Duma) after the 1905 Revolution. Still, the term continued to be applied to the monarchy in Russia until the Russian Revolution of 1917 by Russian revolutionaries and afterwards, in the Soviet Union.

== History ==
Ivan III (reigned 1462–1505) built upon Byzantine traditions and laid foundations for the tsarist autocracy which with some variations would govern Russia for centuries. Absolutism in Russia gradually developed during the 17th and 18th centuries, replacing the despotism of the Grand Duchy of Moscow.

After the chaotic Time of Troubles (1598–1613), the first monarch of the Romanov dynasty, Michael of Russia (reigned 1613–1645), was elected to the throne by a Zemsky Sobor ("assembly of the land"). During Michael's reign, when the Romanov dynasty was still weak, such assemblies were summoned annually. The Romanov dynasty consolidated absolute power in Russia during the reign of Peter the Great (reigned 1682–1725), who reduced the power of the nobility and strengthened the central power of the tsar, establishing a bureaucratic civil service based on the Table of Ranks but theoretically open to all classes of the society, in place of the nobility-only mestnichestvo which Feodor III had abolished in 1682 at the request of the highest boyars. Peter I also strengthened state control over the Russian Orthodox Church.

Peter's reforms provoked a series of palace coups seeking to restore the power of the nobility. To end them, Catherine the Great, whose reign (1762–1796) is often regarded as the high point of absolutism in Russia, in 1785 issued the Charter to the Gentry, legally affirming the rights and privileges they had acquired in preceding years, and the Charter of the Towns, establishing municipal self-government. This placated the powerful classes of society but left real power in the hands of the state bureaucracy. Building on this, Alexander I (reigned 1801–1825) established the State council as an advisory legislative body. Alexander II (1855–1881) established a system of elected local self-government (Zemstvo) and an independent judicial system, but Russia did not have a national-level representative assembly (Duma) or a constitution until the 1905 Revolution.

== Features ==
The tsar himself, the embodiment of sovereign authority, stood at the center of the tsarist autocracy, with full power over the state and its people. The autocrat delegated power to persons and institutions acting on his orders, and within the limits of his laws. The tsar was metaphorically a father and all of his subjects were his children; this metaphor even appeared in Orthodox primers, and is remembered in the common Russian expression "царь-батюшка" tsar-batyushka ("tsar-dear father").

Unlike the movement for separation of church and state in West European monarchies, the Russian Empire combined monarchy with the supreme authority on religious issues (see Church reform of Peter I and caesaropapism for details).

In Russia, the tsar owned a much higher proportion of the state (lands, enterprises, etc.) than did Western monarchs.

== Support by intellectuals ==
Major Russian advocates and theorists of the autocracy included writer Fyodor Dostoyevsky, Mikhail Katkov, Konstantin Aksakov, Nikolay Karamzin, Konstantin Pobedonostsev and Pyotr Semyonov. They all argued that a strong and prosperous Russia needed a strong tsar and that philosophies of republicanism and liberal democracy were alien to it.

== Influences ==
Some historians see the traditions of tsarist autocracy as partially responsible for laying the groundwork for the totalitarianism in the Soviet Union. They see the traditions of autocracy and patrimonialism as dominating Russia's political culture for centuries; for example, Stephen White is described as "the most consistent" defender of the position that the uniqueness of Russian political heritage is inseparable from its ethnic identity. In White's opinion, autocracy is the defining factor in the history of Russian politics. He wrote that Russian political culture is "rooted in the historical experience of centuries of absolutism". Those views had been challenged by other historians, for example, Nicolai N. Petro and Martin Malia (as cited by Hoffmann). Richard Pipes is another influential historian among non-specialists who holds the position about the distinctness of Russian history and political system, describing the absolutism of the Muscovite political system as "patrimonial", and saw the stability of the Soviet Union in the fact that Russians accepted the legitimacy of this patrimonial organization.

== Criticism of the concept ==
Historians of different backgrounds have criticized the concept of tsarist autocracy in its various forms. Their complaints range from the different names of the model being too vague, to its chronological implications (it is impossible to consider Russia in different centuries the same) as well as to its content (the question how Russian or "tsarist" autocracy differs from "regular" autocracy or from European absolutism for that matter). There is no consensus on when the idea of Russian autocracy first originated. Some scholars have pointed to a sentence in the Hypatian Codex under the year 1162, when Andrey Bogolyubsky of Vladimir-Suzdal is said to have exiled his brothers, their mother and bishop Leon, because "he wanted to be the sole ruler" in Suzdalia. The word samovlastets ("sole ruler") was supposedly very similar to samoderzhets ("autocrat") of much later periods. Other scholars regarded this as "rather anachronistic", arguing that Andrey only seemed to have tried to change the order of succession from agnatic seniority to collateral succession.

Regarding the substance of the autocracy model, its equation with despotism and its supposed origins in Mongol rule, as well as its supposed rise in medieval Muscovy, have been heavily debated. For one, Marxist Soviet scholars were concerned with prerevolutionary absolutism and identified the boyar elites and the bureaucracy as its pillars. For example, Sergey M. Troitskii claimed that the Russian monarchs held sway of the nobility which was reduced to state service. According to Troitskii, absolutism in Russia was the same as everywhere else. This led to a difficult position within Marxism because absolutism revolves around institutions and laws, which were fundamentally less important than the socioeconomic base of society. This raises the question of how absolutism could be the same when socioeconomic circumstances in Russia were not the same as elsewhere.

In order to reconcile the non-socioeconomic nature of absolutism with Marxist theory, Soviet scholar Alexander N. Chistozvonov proposed to group the Russian monarchy with the Prussian and Austrian ones, forming a distinct mix of Western European absolutism and "oriental despotism". In the eyes of Chistozvonov, whatever absolutist or autocratic elements were indeed present in Russia, they were not unique and do not warrant Russia's exclusive categorization.

Similarly struggling with Marxist conceptions, Soviet historian Petr A. Zaionchkovskii and his student Larisa G. Zakharova focused on the importance of the political convictions of Russian officials and bureaucrats to explain nineteenth-century political decision-making. By showing that the state was not a unified and powerful whole (commanded by the economically dominant class), they likewise tackled common (Marxist) conceptions of Russian autocracy. While like Troitskii, they studied the nobility and bureaucracy (in a later period), Zaionchkovskii and Zakharova painted a different picture of the tsar's position. Coinciding with Western scholars like Robert Crummey, they lay bare the interdependence of monarch and nobility in the practice of rule.

Outside Russia and the Soviet Union, Hans-Joachim Torke among others tried to counter the notion of an all-powerful autocratic state by pointing at the mutual dependency of service elites and the state (coining the term "state-conditioned society"). Torke acknowledges that the tsars were not reined in by any form of constitution, but he emphasizes, for example, the limitations of Christian morality and court customs. The so-called "American school" of the 1980s and 1990s argued for the important role of elite networks and their power in court. Edward Keenan went even further in his well-known piece on Muscovite political culture, claiming that the tsar was merely a puppet in the hands of boyars who wielded the actual power behind the scenes.

For others, like David Ransel and Paul Bushkovitch, it goes too far to portray relations between tsar and nobility like Keenan does, because it does not appreciate their complexity. Bushkovitch argues that the theoretic lack of limitations on the power of the tsar is irrelevant and instead claims that the "crucial question" is where the real power lay. In his view, this can only be shown by the political narrative of events. Bushkovitch placed the balance of power between the tsar, the individual boyars, and the tsar's favorites at the center of political decision-making. In so doing, Bushkovitch found that on the one hand, the tsar's relative power fluctuated per monarch, and on the other hand, that the nobility was all but unified; the balance of power changed with each tsar as well as the rise of boyars and in the case of Peter I even shifted multiple times.

Charles J. Halperin cautioned against views that too easily claim tsar and state dominance in politics or society. While acknowledging the institutional differences between Muscovy and Western European monarchies, Halperin nevertheless stresses that these differences should not be considered absolute. In his view, the practice of rule, a matter of human interactions, is more important than theory and abstractions.
