= 1969 European Cup Winners' Cup final =

- Match programme cover
- Event: 1968–69 European Cup Winners' Cup
Barcelona	Slovan Bratislava
(Spain)	(Czechoslovakia)
2	3
- Date: 21 May 1969
- Venue: St. Jakob Stadium, Basel
- Referee: Laurens van Ravens (Netherlands)
- Attendance: 19,478

The 1969 European Cup Winners' Cup Final was the final football match of the 1968–69 European Cup Winners' Cup and the ninth European Cup Winners' Cup final. It was contested between Barcelona of Spain and Slovan Bratislava of Czechoslovakia, and was held at St. Jakob Stadium in Basel, Switzerland. Slovan won the match 3–2 thanks to goals from Ľudovít Cvetler, Vladimír Hrivnák and Ján Čapkovič. The game was broadcast on television in 17 countries, and 13 on the radio.

== Route to the final ==
(Spain) Barcelona					(Czechoslovakia) Slovan Bratislava			
Opponent	Agg.	1st leg	2nd leg		Opponent	Agg.	1st leg	2nd leg
(Switzerland) Lugano	4–0	1–0 (A)	3–0 (H)	First round	(Socialist Federal Republic of Yugoslavia) Bor	3–2	3–0 (H)	0–2 (A)
Bye				Second round	(Portugal) Porto	4–1	0–1 (A)	4–0 (H)
(Norway) Lyn	5–4	3–2 (A)	2–2 (H)	Quarter-finals	(Italy) Torino	3–1	1–0 (A)	2–1 (H)
(West Germany) Köln	6–3	2–2 (A)	4–1 (H)	Semi-finals	(Scotland) Dunfermline Athletic	2–1	1–1 (A)	1–0 (H)

== Match ==
=== Details ===
21 May 1969
19:00 CEST

Barcelona (Spain)	2–3	(Czechoslovakia) Slovan Bratislava
Zaldúa 16'; Rexach 52'	Report	Cvetler 2'; Hrivnák 30'; Ján Čapkovič 42'

St. Jakob Stadium, Basel
Attendance: 19,478
Referee: Laurens van Ravens (Netherlands)

Barcelona	Slovan Bratislava

GK	1	(Spain) Salvador Sadurní
RB	2	(Spain) Josep Franch	(substituted off) 11'
CB	4	(Spain) Joaquim Rifé
CB	5	(Spain) Ferran Olivella (c)
LB	3	(Spain) Eladio
AM	8	(Spain) Santiago Castro	(substituted off) 46'
DM	6	(Spain) Pedro Zabalza
AM	10	(Spain) Josep Maria Fusté
RW	7	(Spain) Carlos Pellicer
CF	9	(Spain) José Antonio Zaldúa
LW	11	(Spain) Carles Rexach
Substitutes:
RB	13	(Spain) Chus Pereda	(substituted on) 11'
FW	14	(Portugal) Mendonça	(substituted on) 46'
Manager:
(Spain) Salvador Artigas

GK	1	(Czechoslovakia) Alexander Vencel
RB	2	(Czechoslovakia) Jozef Fillo
CB	3	(Czechoslovakia) Vladimír Hrivnák
CB	5	(Czechoslovakia) Alexander Horváth (c)
LB	4	(Czechoslovakia) Ján Zlocha
CM	9	(Czechoslovakia) Jozef Čapkovič
CM	6	(Czechoslovakia) Ivan Hrdlička
RW	7	(Czechoslovakia) Ľudovít Cvetler
SS	8	(Czechoslovakia) Ladislav Móder	(substituted off) 67'
SS	10	(Czechoslovakia) Karol Jokl
LW	11	(Czechoslovakia) Ján Čapkovič
Substitutes:
FW	14	(Czechoslovakia) Bohumil Bizoň	(substituted on) 67'
Manager:
(Czechoslovakia) Michal Vičan

Assistant referees:
Schalks (Netherlands)
Vervoot (Netherlands)

== Post-match ==
Following Slovan's victory, manager Michal Vičan described himself as extremely happy. He pointed out that defensive errors on both sides had led to goals, and commended his team's fighting spirit. He also stated that his players represented Czechoslovakia well and wished the national team success for their 1970 FIFA World Cup qualification – UEFA Group 2 match away in Hungary four days later.

Barcelona manager Salvador Artigas congratulated his opponents, describing the Bratislava players as more tactical and combative. He also bemoaned his side's bad luck.

During the match, famous commentator Gabo Zelenay delivered the slogan "Bieli jastrabi z Tehelného poľa bratislavského" (White Hawks from Tehelné pole Bratislava), referring to the Slovan players who had achieved success in the final. The phrase later became one of the nicknames for the club.

== See also ==
- 1969 European Cup Final
- 1969 Inter-Cities Fairs Cup Final
- FC Barcelona in international football competitions
- ŠK Slovan Bratislava in European football
