= Square root of 10 =

Irrational algebraic number

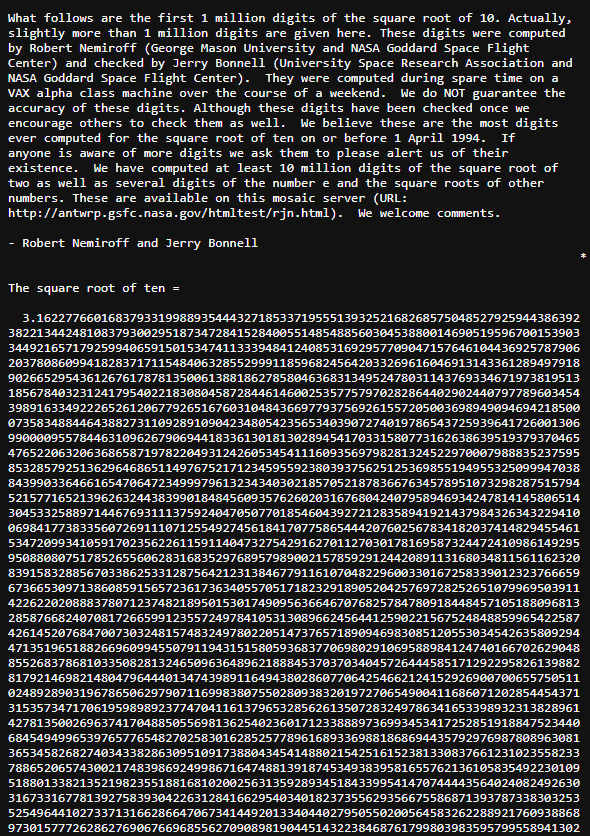
First several thousand digits of the square root of 10 from NASA

In mathematics, the square root of 10 is the positive real number that, when multiplied by itself, gives the number 10. It is approximately equal to 3.16.

Historically, the square root of 10 has been used as an approximation for the mathematical constant π, with some mathematicians erroneously arguing that the square root of 10 is itself the ratio between the diameter and circumference of a circle. The number also plays a key role in the calculation of orders of magnitude.

== Characteristics ==
The 13th-century physician Abd al-Latif al-Baghdadi was noted by biographers to have compared "uncertainty in medicine to the mathematical impossibility of determining irrational numbers such as pi or the square root of ten". Specifically, in his Book of the Two Pieces of Advice (Kitāb al-Naṣīḥatayn) Abd al-Latif offered "as an example the surface of the circle or a square root such as that of ten", saying that "if someone says that the square root of ten is three, he cannot be counted as an arithmetician, and his words cannot be accepted".

The first sixty significant digits of its decimal expansion are:

3.162277660168379331998893544432718533719555139325216826857504... (sequence A010467 in the OEIS)

The decimal digits of its reciprocal are the same, though shifted: $\frac{1}{\sqrt{10}}$ = 0.31622....

More than a million decimal digits of the square root of 10 have been published, with NASA having announced publication of the first million digits on April 1, 1994. As of December 2013, its numerical value in decimal had reportedly been computed to at least ten billion digits.

== Historical approximation with Pi ==
As discussed by Jan Gullberg in Mathematics from the Birth of Numbers, because of its closeness to the mathematical constant π, the square root of 10 has been used as an approximation for it in various ancient texts. According to William Alexander Myers, some Arab mathematicians calculated the circumference of a unit circle to be $\sqrt{10}$. Chinese mathematician Zhang Heng (78–139) approximated pi as 3.162 by taking the square root of 10.

Gullberg noted that the early Greeks, while using 3 as an "everyday use" approximation for pi, also used the square root of 10 "for matters more serious", noting that this usage was empirical in that it was "based exclusively on practical experience, not on theoretical considerations"; it was not until the 2nd century BC that Hipparchus computed a much closer value of Pi of 3.14166. Hermann Schubert, in reporting mathematical literature from ancient India, similarly asserts that pi was believed to be equal to the square root of 10:

Strange to say, the good approximate value of Aryabhatta does not occur in Bramagupta, the great Hindu mathematician who flourished in the beginning of the seventh century; but we find the curious information in this author that the area of a circle is exactly equal to the square root of 10 when the radius is unity. The value of π as derivable from this formula—a value from two to three hundredths too large—has unquestionably arisen upon Hindu soil. For it occurs in no Grecian mathematician; and Arabian authors, who were in a better position than we to know Greek and Hindu mathematical literature, declare that the approximation, which makes π equal to the square root of 10, is of Hindu origin.

Schubert hypothesized that this was because "the Hindu people" were "addicted more than any other to numeral mysticism", and therefore "sought to find in this approximation some connection with the fact that man has ten fingers; and ten accordingly is the basis of their numeral system".

In 1594, Joseph Justus Scaliger, who had been named a professor at the University of Leiden the previous year, published Cyclometrica Elementa duo, on squaring the circle, in which he "claimed that the ratio of the circumference of the circle to the diameter was √10". His draft was read by Ludolph van Ceulen, who recognized this as erroneous and counseled Scaliger against publishing the work. Scalinger did so anyway, and shortly thereafter Adriaan van Roomen "wrote a devastating answer to Scaliger's claims". Van Ceulen also criticized Scalinger's claims in his Vanden Circkel (About the Circle), published in 1596, although he did not identify Scaliger as their source.

== Rational approximations ==
The square root of 10 can be expressed as the continued fraction
$$[3; 6, 6, 6, 6, 6,\ldots] = 3 + \cfrac 1 {6 + \cfrac 1 {6 + \cfrac 1 {6+ \cfrac 1 {6+\dots}}}}.$$
(sequence A040006 in the OEIS). In particular, it is 3 less than the sixth metallic ratio, which has the continued fraction expansion of [6; 6, 6, ...].

The successive partial evaluations of the continued fraction, which are called its convergents, are highly accurate: (Note: Each is accurate, in that the difference between the approximation n/d and √10 is bounded by $\left|\frac{n}{d} - \sqrt{10}\right| \le \frac{1}{d^2}$, where in each case, n is the numerator and d the denominator of the fraction.)

$$\frac{3}{1}, \frac{19}{6}, \frac{117}{37}, \frac{721}{228}, \frac{4443}{1405}, \frac{27379}{8658}, \frac{168717}{53353}, \frac{1039681}{328776}, \frac{6406803}{2026009} \dots$$

Their numerators are 3, 19, 117, 721, … (sequence A005667 in the OEIS), and their denominators are 1, 6, 37, 228, … (sequence A005668 in the OEIS).

Every second convergent corresponds to a solution of the Pell's equation $n^2 - 10d^2 = 1$:
$$\frac{n}{d} = \frac{19}{6}, \frac{721}{228},\frac{27379}{8658}, \frac{1039681}{328776}, \frac{39480499}{12484830}, \dots$$

Iterations of Newton's method converge more quickly. For example, one can use x_{0} = 3 and
$$x_{k+1} = \frac{1}{2} \left(x_k + \frac{10}{x_k}\right)$$
to generate a sequence of values in which each subsequent approximation is accurate to about twice as many digits as its predecessor:
$$x_k = \frac{3}{1}, \frac{19}{6}, \frac{721}{228}, \frac{1039681}{328776}, \frac{2161873163521}{683644320912}, \dots$$

Halley's method, using
$$x_{k+1} = x_k \frac{{x_k}^2 + 30}{3 {x_k}^2 + 10}\,,$$
roughly triples the number of digits of accuracy with each iteration:
$$x_k = \frac{3}{1}, \frac{117}{37}, \frac{6406803}{2026009}, \dots$$

== Slide rules ==
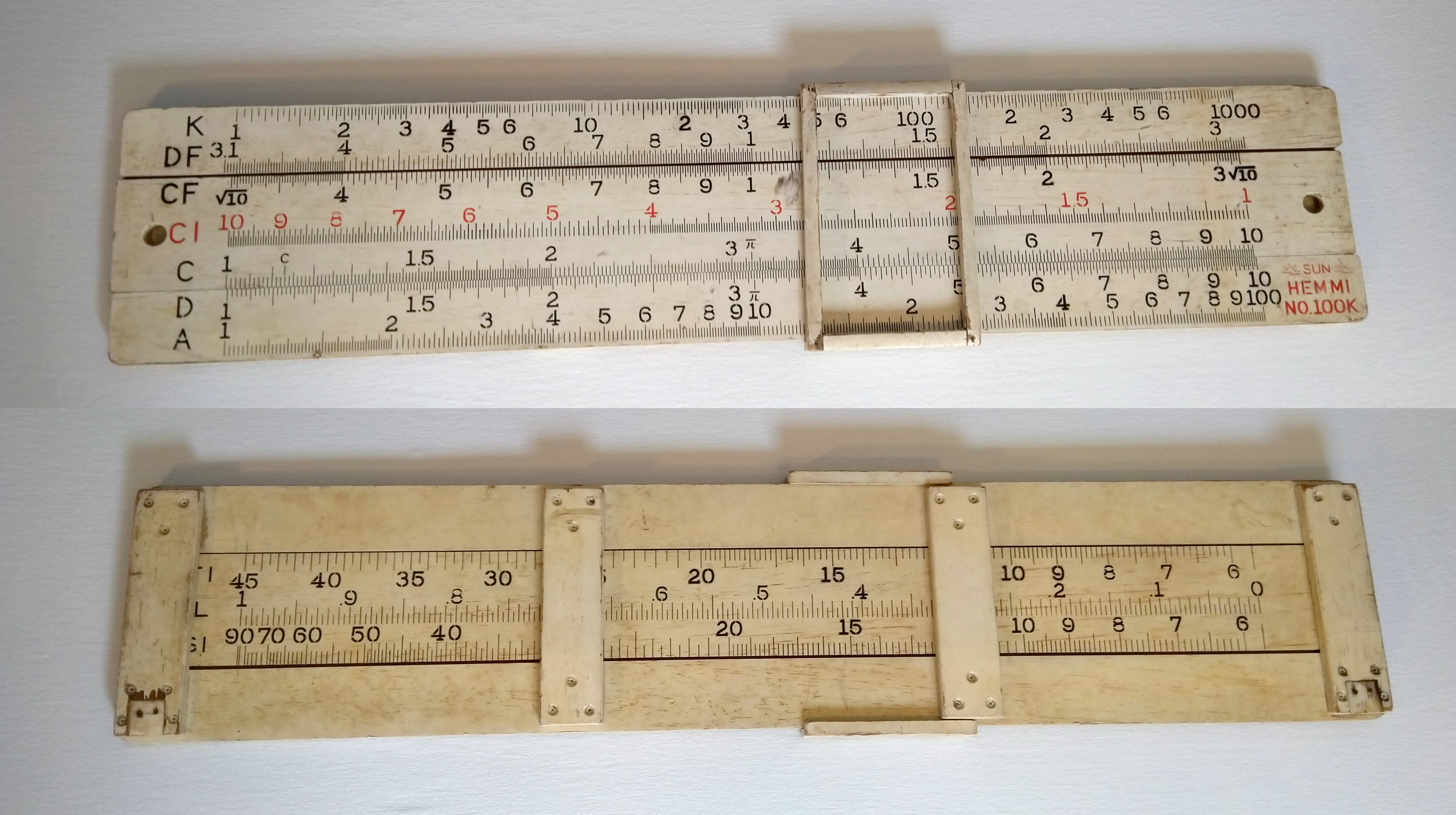
A Hemmi No. 100K classroom demonstrator slide rule with CF and DF scales folded at the square root of 10

$\sqrt{10}$ has been used as a folding point for the folded scales on slide rules, mainly because scale settings folded with the number can be changed without changing the result.

== Orders of magnitude ==
The square root of 10 is of important in order-of-magnitude calculations and estimates. The order of magnitude of a quantity is the nearest power of 10 it corresponds to. For example, 899 m is closer to 10^{3} m than to 10^{2} m, thus has an order of magnitude of 10^{3} or 1000, when expressed in meters. Mathematically, taking the common logarithm and rounding to the nearest integer, and taking 10 to that power gives the order of magnitude. (Note: For 899 m, this would be $\log 899 \approx 2.95...$, which after rounding to the nearest integer, is 3, so 10^{3} is the order of magnitude.)

Because orders of magnitude are logarithmic, the halfway mark between 10^{0} and 10^{1} is 10^{0.5} = √10 ≈ 3.16. Thus, when expressed in scientific notation, for a number below 3.16 × 10^{x}, x should be rounded down (order of magnitude 10^{x}), and for a number above 3.16 × 10^{x}, x should be rounded up (order of magnitude 10^{x+1}).

The square root of 10 corresponds to one half of an order of magnitude.

A level difference of 10 dB (1 bel) corresponds to a power ratio of 10, one order of magnitude, or an amplitude (field quantity) ratio of the square root of 10, a half order of magnitude.
