= Tetro (surname) =

Tetro is a surname. Notable people with the surname include:

- Cydni Tetro, American CEO, speaker, and serial entrepreneur
- Sara Tetro, New Zealand model, television host, actress, and entrepreneur
- Tony Tetro (born 1950), American art forger

== See also ==
- Petro
