= Josep Franch =

Josep Franch is the name of:

- Josep Franch (basketball) (born 1991), Spanish basketball player
- Josep Franch (footballer) (1943–2021), Spanish footballer
