= OAP Bratislava =

Defunct Slovak football club

- Full name: Oddiel armádnych pretekárov Bratislava
- Founded: January 21, 1941; 85 years ago
- Dissolved: October 1944
- League: Slovenská liga

OAP Bratislava (Slovak: Oddiel armádnych pretekárov Bratislava, lit. 'The Bratislava Army Athletes' Unit') was a Slovak Army football club that operated during World War II in the Slovak Republic. The club was unofficially managed by Leopold Šťastný, who introduced a new system of training, helping OAP become the champion of Slovakia in the 1942–43 season, beating title favorites and rivals ŠK Bratislava. After various transfers of its departments, the OAP was finally abolished in October 1944 due to the dissolution of the Slovak Army. The team was considered one of the best football clubs in the country at the time.

== History ==
In October 1940, the Ministry of National Defense created a systematized position of physical education officer, which was held during its existence by the Olympian - officer Jozef Benedik. Already that year, after the selection of riders, football players and hockey players were called to Bratislava, where they were concentrated in the barracks on Tehelné pole. The establishment of the OAP can be officially dated to January 21, 1941, when the Minister of National Defense issued the relevant order. During World War II, many football players served in military service, so the need arose to create an Army XI. The club was unofficially (due to him being Jewish) managed by Leopold Šťastný, who introduced a new system of training, helping OAP become the champion of Slovakia in the 1942–43 season, beating title favorites and rivals ŠK Bratislava.

The successful campaign of the newcomer in the league itself attracted a record attendance of 12,000 spectators to Tehelné Pole during derby matches against ŠK Bratislava. The first match ended in a 1–0 victory for OAP after Petrášek's goal. In the spring of 1943, ŠK Bratislava won with a score of 2–1. The approaching front allowed only two league matches, in the autumn of 1943, a goalless draw and in the spring of 1944, OAP won 3–2, but that did not help them defend the championship title. Just like OAP in the 1942–43 season, ŠK Bratislava won the title a year later with a seven-point gap.

The club largely deteriorated over the course of the war. In May 1944, due to the air bombing of Bratislava, OAP moved to the barracks of J. Holubyho in Pezinok. After the collapse of the Slovak army in September 1944, OAP Bratislava and its activities were discontinued, and organizationally integrated into the 1st regiment of the Militia.

== Notable players ==
Had international caps for their respective countries.

- (Slovakia) Michal Vičan
- (Slovakia) Ľudovít Dubovský
- (Slovakia) Jozef Baláži
- (Slovakia) František Bolček

== Literature ==
- Štefan Mašlonka and Jozef Kšiňan: Zlatá kniha futbalu na Slovensku, Šport 1988
- Miroslav Hazucha: ...úspešný 40 rokov, 2007
- Eugen Magda: Základný kameň slovenského futbalu, OZ Futbalová litera 2009
- Jozef Kšiňan a Igor Mráz: 90 belasých rokov, ŠK Slovan 2009
