= Vladimír Hrivnák =

Slovak footballer and manager

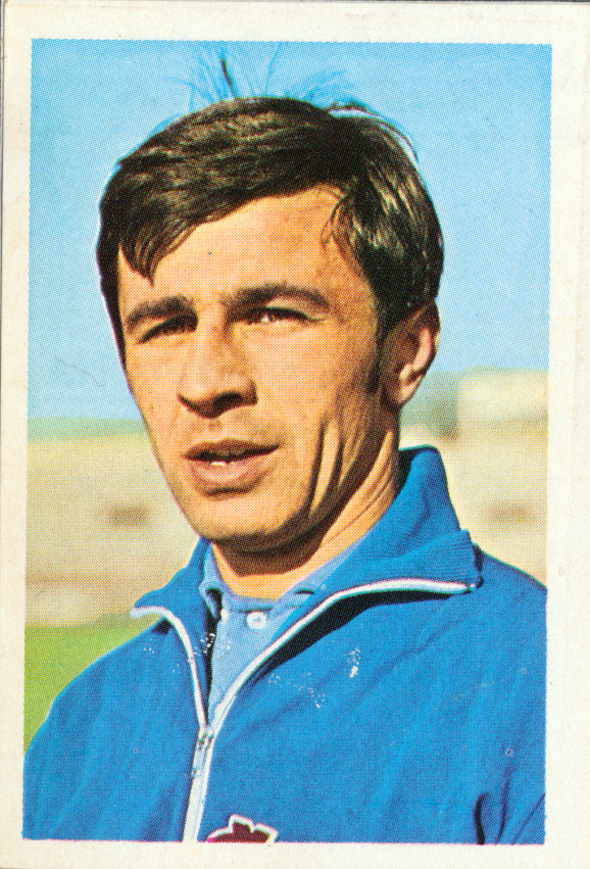
- Hrivnák in 1970

Personal information
- Date of birth: 23 April 1945
- Place of birth: Hnúšťa, Czechoslovakia
- Date of death: 17 October 2014 (aged 69)
- Place of death: Bratislava, Slovakia
- Height: 1.78 m (5 ft 10 in)
- Position: Defender

Youth career
- 1958: TJ Jacovce
- 1959-1960: TS Topoľčany
- 1960-1966: TJ Jacovce
- 1966-1969: Iskra Partizánske

Senior career*
Years	Team	Apps	(Gls)
1965-1973	Slovan Bratislava	139	(1)

International career
1969–1972	Czechoslovakia	13	(0)

Managerial career
- 1978–1981: DAC Dunajská Streda
- 1982: ZŤS Košice
- 1988: Inter Bratislava
- 1991–1992: DAC Dunajská Streda
- 1994–1996: Matador Púchov
- ŠKP Bratislava
- * Club domestic league appearances and goals

Vladimír Hrivnák (23 April 1945 – 17 October 2014) was a Slovak football player and later a football manager. He played for Czechoslovakia, for which he played 13 matches. He helped Slovan Bratislava to the 1969 European Cup Winners' Cup Final where he scored one of their goals as they beat Barcelona 3–2.

He was a participant at the 1970 FIFA World Cup. He played mostly for Slovan Bratislava.

Hrivnák coached DAC Dunajská Streda, ZŤS Košice, Inter Bratislava, DAC Dunajská Streda, Matador Púchov, ŠKP Bratislava.
