= 1971–72 Czechoslovak First League =

Czechoslovak First League
- Season: 1971–72
- Champions: Spartak Trnava
- Relegated: Inter Bratislava; Jednota Trenčín
- European Cup: Spartak Trnava
- Cup Winners' Cup: Sparta Prague
- UEFA Cup: ŠK Slovan Bratislava; Dukla Prague
- Top goalscorer: Ján Čapkovič (19 goals)

Statistics of Czechoslovak First League in the 1971–72 season.

== Overview ==
It was contested by 16 teams, and Spartak Trnava won the championship. Ján Čapkovič was the league's top scorer with 19 goals.

== Stadia and locations ==
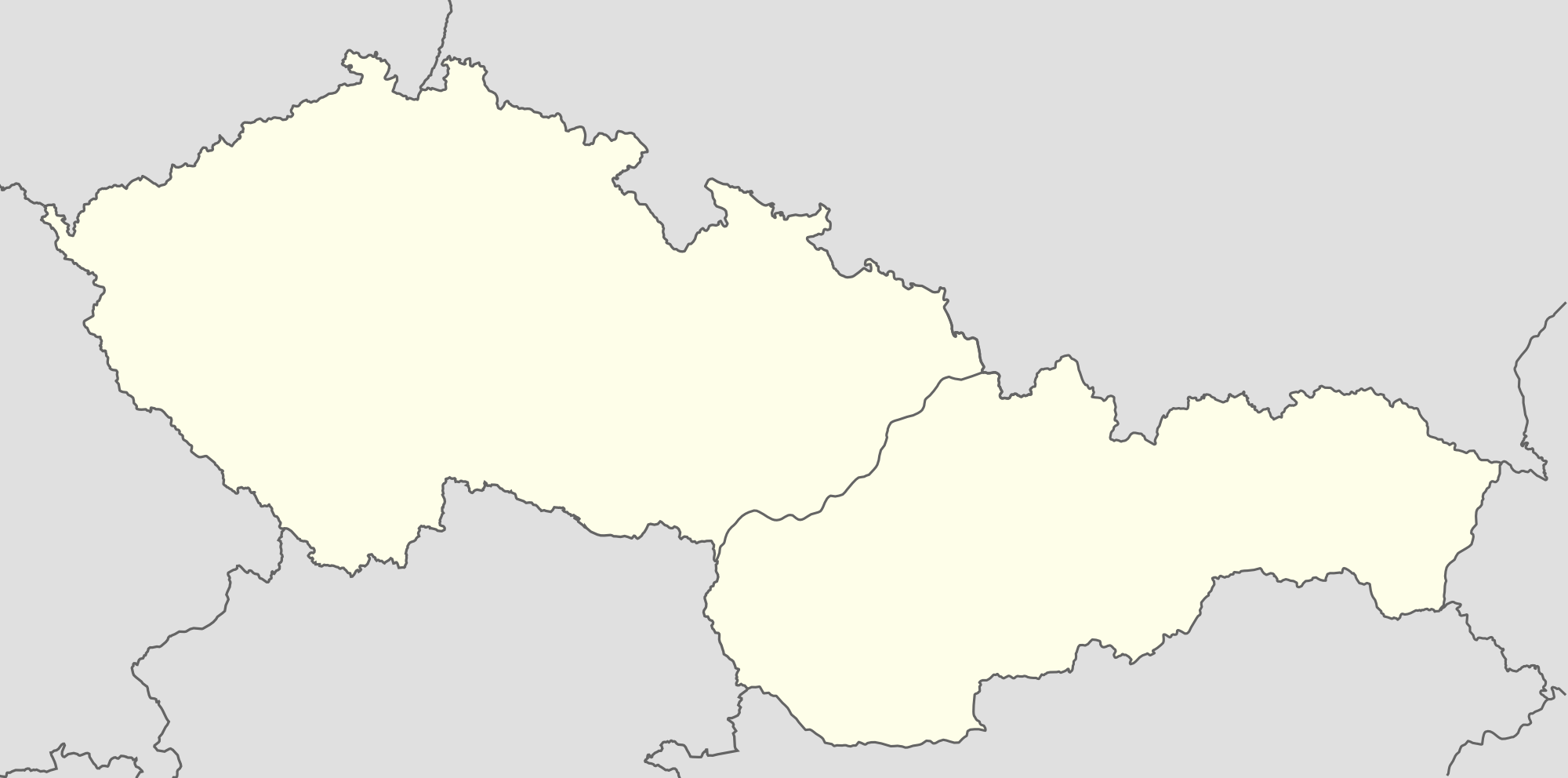
Location of clubs in the 1971–72 Czechoslovak First League

== League standings ==
Pos	Team	Pld	W	D	L	GF	GA	GD	Pts	Qualification or relegation
1	Spartak Trnava (C)	30	17	10	3	60	25	+35	44	Qualification for European Cup first round
2	Slovan Bratislava	30	18	6	6	68	37	+31	42	Qualification for UEFA Cup first round
3	Dukla Prague	30	14	7	9	56	40	+16	35	Qualification for UEFA Cup first round
4	VSS Košice	30	12	11	7	38	28	+10	35	
5	ZVL Žilina	30	12	7	11	39	35	+4	31	
6	Sparta Prague	30	13	5	12	50	52	−2	31	Qualification for Cup Winners' Cup first round
7	Slavia Prague	30	13	2	15	30	37	−7	28	
8	Lokomotíva Košice	30	11	6	13	33	44	−11	28	
9	Sklo Union Teplice	30	9	9	12	36	37	−1	27	
10	Nitra	30	10	7	13	31	41	−10	27	
11	Tatran Prešov	30	10	7	13	31	42	−11	27	
12	Baník Ostrava	30	10	6	14	39	41	−2	26	
13	TŽ Třinec	30	9	8	13	41	46	−5	26	
14	Zbrojovka Brno	30	8	9	13	42	61	−19	25	
15	Inter Bratislava (R)	30	8	8	14	35	42	−7	24	Relegation to Czechoslovak Second League
16	Jednota Trenčín (R)	30	9	6	15	31	52	−21	24	Relegation to Czechoslovak Second League

Source: rsssf.com
(C) Champions; (R) Relegated

== Results ==
Home \ Away	OST	DUK	INT	TRE	LOK	NIT	TEP	SLA	SLO	SPA	TRN	PRE	TŘI	KOŠ	BRN	ŽIL
Baník Ostrava		2–0	0–0	5–2	2–0	2–3	1–0	2–0	0–0	5–2	1–2	0–1	5–0	0–0	1–1	1–2
Dukla Prague	2–0		1–0	4–0	5–2	1–0	5–1	1–0	0–2	3–2	3–0	1–0	5–2	2–2	4–0	1–1
Inter Bratislava	4–1	2–3		3–0	0–1	4–0	0–3	1–0	1–1	1–0	0–2	0–0	1–1	0–3	4–0	1–0
Jednota Trenčín	1–2	3–1	2–1		3–0	1–0	1–1	2–0	3–0	1–1	2–0	2–1	1–1	1–0	0–0	0–1
Lokomotíva Košice	1–0	1–1	0–3	1–0		3–2	2–0	0–2	3–0	2–3	1–1	1–1	4–0	0–1	1–1	1–0
Nitra	3–1	2–2	3–0	0–0	0–0		0–0	1–0	1–2	2–1	2–2	1–0	1–0	0–0	2–1	2–0
Sklo Union Teplice	1–1	3–1	3–2	4–0	0–0	3–0		1–0	1–3	1–1	1–3	3–0	0–0	0–3	2–0	3–0
Slavia Prague	1–0	2–1	2–2	1–0	0–1	1–0	1–0		1–3	2–1	0–2	2–0	1–0	0–0	3–1	2–0
Slovan Bratislava	4–2	2–0	3–1	3–0	3–1	3–0	2–0	3–1		6–1	2–2	4–2	1–1	3–0	4–2	5–1
Sparta Prague	1–0	2–1	2–0	3–1	3–1	2–2	0–0	2–1	2–1		4–2	5–1	4–2	2–1	4–0	1–1
Spartak Trnava	1–1	2–0	2–1	4–2	3–0	1–0	2–1	4–1	1–1	2–0		3–1	4–0	6–0	7–0	0–0
Tatran Prešov	0–1	1–0	2–0	1–0	0–3	0–3	2–1	3–1	2–1	5–1	1–1		2–0	1–0	1–1	0–0
TŽ Třinec	2–3	1–1	5–1	7–0	3–1	2–0	2–0	0–1	2–1	3–0	0–0	1–1		1–1	1–0	2–1
VSS Košice	3–0	1–1	1–1	2–0	0–1	3–0	0–0	4–2	2–2	1–0	0–0	1–0	1–0		2–2	3–0
Zbrojovka Brno	2–0	3–3	1–1	2–2	5–1	3–0	2–0	1–0	2–3	3–0	0–1	1–1	4–2	3–2		1–3
ZVL Žilina	2–0	1–3	0–0	3–1	2–0	3–1	3–3	1–2	2–0	1–0	0–0	4–1	1–0	0–1	6–0	

Source: statistiky1ligy.fotbal.cz
Legend: Blue = home team win; Yellow = draw; Red = away team win.

== Attendances ==
No.	Club	Average	Change	Highest
1	Slovan Bratislava	15,963	101.9%	36,800
2	Sparta Praha	15,189	2.5%	22,940
3	Zbrojovka Brno	14,888	65.4%	33,733
4	Spartak Trnava	12,975	25.6%	22,500
5	Baník Ostrava	11,482	20.2%	27,252
6	Slavia Praha	11,347	8.4%	18,974
7	Dukla Praha	7,550	71.8%	25,389
8	VSS Košice	7,449	49.4%	18,000
9	AC Nitra	7,290	104.0%	12,553
10	ZVL Žilina	5,857	27.1%	12,746
11	Sklo Union Teplice	5,388	-1.3%	8,182
12	Inter Bratislava	5,366	40.2%	9,964
13	TŽ Třinec	4,858	-26.5%	12,796
14	Lokomotíva Košice	4,637	22.1%	11,795
15	Tatran Prešov	4,411	5.5%	10,071
16	Jednota Trenčín	4,154	-3.8%	12,423
