= František Karkó =

Slovak footballer (1944–2022)

Personal information
- Date of birth: 27 February 1944
- Place of birth: Kravany nad Dunajom, Slovakia
- Date of death: 3 May 2022 (aged 78)
- Place of death: Slovakia
- Position: Forward

Senior career*
Years	Team	Apps	(Gls)
1962–1963	Spartak Komárno		
1963–	Dukla Brno		
–1966	Spartak ZJŠ Brno		
1966–1968	Strojárne Martin		
1968–1973	TŽ Třinec	58	(15)
1973–1980	Strojárne Martin		

International career
1971	Czechoslovakia	2	(2)

Managerial career
- Strojárne Martin
- Bardejov
- Ružomberok
- 1996–1997: Třinec
- Turčianske Teplice
- Michalovce
- Žiar nad Hronom
- * Club domestic league appearances and goals

František Karkó (27 February 1944 – 3 May 2022) was a Slovak footballer and manager.

== Playing career ==
Born in Kravany nad Dunajom, Karkó started playing football with both a tennis ball and a rubber ball. At the age of 18, he joined Spartak Komárno, before joining Dukla Brno. He spent three years in Brno with Dukla Brno and Spartak ZJŠ Brno, before returning to Slovakia with TŽ Třinec in 1968, and helping them reach the Czechoslovak First League for the 1970–71 season. In 1973, he returned to Strojárne Martin, where he would retire in 1980, at the age of 36.

=== International career ===
Karkó made two appearances for the Czechoslovakia national team, scoring twice, with both coming in a UEFA Euro 1972 qualifying win against Finland. He would later play against Brazil at the Maracanã, where Czechoslovakia lost 1–0. While at TŽ Třinec, fans of the team chanted that he should've gone to the 1970 FIFA World Cup in Mexico.

== Managerial career ==
Following his retirement. he worked as both a manager and assistant manager for the likes of Strojárne Martin, Třinec, Turčianske Teplice, Michalovce, and Žiar nad Hronom.

== Personal life and death ==
In 1997, Karkó was involved in a serious car accident, which would take nearly a year to recover from. He died on 3 May 2022, following an illness.
