= Naked in Deccan =

1983 novel by Venkatesh Kulkami

- Author: Venkatesh Kulkarni
- Language: English
- Publisher: Stemmer House
- Publication date: 1983
- ISBN: 0-88045-030-4 (first edition)
- Dewey Decimal: 813.54
- LC Class: PS3561.U444 N3

Naked in Deccan is a 1983 English-language novel by Venkatesh Kulkarni, published by Stemmer House. Kularni's first novel, Naked in Deccan explores the social climate of the Telugu people living in the Deccan region. The Library Journal stated that the novel, which has a "somber" character, "shows an India which is different from the popular image of that ancient and mysterious country, but it has a ring of truth." Carlo Coppola of Oakland University wrote that the novel portrays an attempt to change the Deccan social order that comes with good intentions and yet fails and brings severe consequences commonly occurring failed attempts to change social hierarchies. Bruce Allen of the Chicago Tribune wrote that "This splendid novel shows, in remarkably brief compasss [sic], how idealists`dreams of peace and progress founder against the reality of human frailty."

Coopola stated that he sees similarities between the character and social climate of southern Italians and those of the Telugu people, who refer to themselves as the "Italians of Asia," and likewise between works by Ignazio Silone and Naked in Deccan.

The title refers to the main characters being exposed by the novel's conflicts before their downfalls.

The novel was initially released in 1983 and was re-released in 1985 to increase its exposure.

== Plot ==
The novel stars Sali Thimma, a Dalit (untouchable), or someone who is outside of the Indian caste system and therefore has the lowest social status in the Hindu society of the period. The novel is set after the assassination of Mahatma Gandhi.

Thimma is given an education normally reserved for people of higher castes by a Brahmin landowner, referred to as "Master," who has pro-untouchable beliefs originating from Mohandas Gandhi's philosophy. A police officer who has a higher caste than Thimma oppresses him, because Thimma is not acting according to his status. The police chief takes possession of Thimma's wife, who is cheating on him. Thimma also has to deal with the struggling village and other landowners.

The master's youngest son, referred to as "Prince," goes against his rank by mixing with untouchables. Prince, who has familiarity with works of Western literature and is an intellectual, is killed. Thimma's father appears as a ghost on one occasion, and there are multiple sexual encounters that occur.

== Writing style ==
Coppola stated that the characters, prose style, plot, and setting all appear "lean" and that this is the best word one could use to describe Naked in Deccan. Coppola added that the prose is "sinewy, stark but replete with stunning flourishes" with "taut, idiomatic, even searing" dialog and repartee.

== Reception ==
The Chicago Tribune had named Naked in Deccan one of the top novels of 1985. For writing the book, the Before Columbus Foundation gave Kularni the 1984 American Book Award. Allen wrote that the novel was obscure despite its quality.

Coppola wrote that the novel "exhibits a literary talent which, at full maturity, may become a force in shaping fiction in both India and the West." The Library Journal stated that Naked in Deccan was "well written and ambitious". Allen wrote that Naked in Deccan "one of the best novels of recent years--and nobody knows about it."
