= Petro Zakhvalynsky =

Petro Zakhvalynsky (Ukrainian: Петро Захвалинський, Russian: Пётр Захвалынский), also known under pseudonym "Roman", (died 1943) was a Ukrainian nationalist, member of Andriy Melnyk's faction in OUN.

During the Russian Civil War, Zakhvalynsky was an officer in Petlura's army; after its defeat, he emigrated to France where he joined the OUN. After the split of OUN in 1941, he supported Andriy Melnyk's faction. In October 1941, Zakhvalynsky came to Ukraine as a member of OUN groups that cooperated with Germans and were sent to occupied territories in order to establish a Ukrainian presence in the local administration under German occupation.

In September 1941, Kiev was occupied by Germans. Zakhvalynsky was active in establishing, aided Oleh Olzhych and Stepan Sulyatytsky, an auxiliary police force known as the Kiev Kurin, of which he became the commander in November 1941.

The Kiev auxiliary police were later united with Bukovyna Kurin and reformed, and Zakhvalynsky remained its commander. From November 1941, he was chief of police for the Kiev General District). In August 1942, he was removed from both offices (i.e. Chief of police of Kiev City and Kiev General District) and replaced by Anatol Kabaida. He was appointed a Hauptmann of the 2nd company of the 115th battalion of Schutzmannschaft, participated in numerous operations against both partisans and civilians.

In 1943, Zakhvalynsky was secretly executed by Germans for nationalist agitation among his soldiers.

== Literature ==
- Дерейко І. Діяльність 115/62-го українського батальйону шуцманшафту на теренах Білорусі та Франції в 1942—1944 рр. //Наукові записки НАУКМА. Т.21: Історичні науки. — К., 2003. In Ukrainian.
