= ŠK Slovan Bratislava in European football =

- Club: Slovan Bratislava
- First entry: 1956–57 European Cup
- Latest entry: 2026–27 UEFA Champions League

Titles
- Cup Winners' Cup: 1 (1969)

This is a list of all results of ŠK Slovan Bratislava in European football.

== Overall record ==
As of 31 August 2025

Competition	Pld	W	D	L	GF	GA
European Cup/UEFA Champions League	71	25	16	30	83	107
UEFA Cup/UEFA Europa League	98	39	20	39	156	149
UEFA Cup Winners' Cup	29	15	4	10	43	34
UEFA Conference League	24	9	7	8	32	32
Total	222	88	47	87	314	322

== Results ==
Season	Competition	Round	Opponent	Home	Away	Aggregate
1956–57	European Cup	Preliminary	(Poland) Legia Warsaw	4–0	0–2	4–2
1956–57	European Cup	1R	(Switzerland) Grasshoppers	1–0	0–2	1–2
1962–63	UEFA Cup Winners' Cup	1R	(Switzerland) Lausanne	1–0	1–1	2–1
1962–63	UEFA Cup Winners' Cup	Quarter-finals	(England) Tottenham Hotspur	2–0	0–6	2–6
1963–64	UEFA Cup Winners' Cup	Preliminary	(Finland) HPS	8–1	4–1	12–2
1963–64	UEFA Cup Winners' Cup	1R	(Wales) Borough United	3–0	1–0	4–0
1963–64	UEFA Cup Winners' Cup	Quarter-finals	(Scotland) Celtic	0–1	0–1	0–2
1968–69	UEFA Cup Winners' Cup	1R	(Socialist Federal Republic of Yugoslavia) Bor	3–0	0–2	3–2
1968–69	UEFA Cup Winners' Cup	2R	(Portugal) Porto	4–0	0–1	4–1
1968–69	UEFA Cup Winners' Cup	Quarter-finals	(Italy) Torino	2–1	1–0	3–1
1968–69	UEFA Cup Winners' Cup	Semi-finals	(Scotland) Dunfermline Athletic	1–0	1–1	2–1
1968–69	UEFA Cup Winners' Cup	Final	(Spain) Barcelona	3–2		
1969–70	UEFA Cup Winners' Cup	1R	(Socialist Federal Republic of Yugoslavia) Dinamo Zagreb	0–0	0–3	0–3
1970–71	European Cup	1R	(Denmark) Boldklubben 1903	2–1	2–2	4–3
1970–71	European Cup	2R	(Greece) Panathinaikos	2–1	0–3	2–4
1972–73	UEFA Cup	1R	(Socialist Federal Republic of Yugoslavia) Vojvodina	6–0	2–1	8–1
1972–73	UEFA Cup	2R	(Spain) Las Palmas	0–1	2–2	2–3
1974–75	European Cup	1R	(Belgium) Anderlecht	4–2	1–3	5–5 (a)
1975–76	European Cup	1R	(England) Derby County	1–0	0–3	1–3
1976–77	UEFA Cup	1R	(Iceland) Fram	5–0	3–0	8–0
1976–77	UEFA Cup	2R	(England) Queens Park Rangers	3–3	2–5	5–8
1982–83	UEFA Cup Winners' Cup	1R	(Italy) Internazionale	2–1	0–2	2–3
1989–90	UEFA Cup Winners' Cup	1R	(Switzerland) Grasshoppers	3–0	0–4 (a.e.t.)	3–4
1991–92	UEFA Cup	1R	(Spain) Real Madrid	1–2	1–1	2–3
1992–93	UEFA Champions League	1R	(Hungary) Ferencváros	4–1	0–0	4–1
1992–93	UEFA Champions League	2R	(Italy) Milan	0–1	0–4	0–5
1993–94	UEFA Cup	1R	(England) Aston Villa	0–0	1–2	1–2
1994–95	UEFA Cup	Preliminary	(Northern Ireland) Portadown	3–0	2–0	5–0
1994–95	UEFA Cup	1R	(Denmark) Copenhagen	1–0	1–1	2–1
1994–95	UEFA Cup	2R	(Germany) Borussia Dortmund	2–1	0–3	2–4
1995–96	UEFA Cup	Preliminary	(Croatia) Osijek	4–0	2–0	6–0
1995–96	UEFA Cup	1R	(Germany) 1. FC Kaiserslautern	2–1	0–3	2–4
1996–97	UEFA Cup	Preliminary	(Republic of Ireland) St Patrick's Athletic	1–0	4–3	5–3
1996–97	UEFA Cup	Qualifying	(Turkey) Trabzonspor	2–1	1–4	3–5
1997–98	UEFA Cup Winners' Cup	Q	(Bulgaria) Levski Sofia	2–1	1–1	3–2
1997–98	UEFA Cup Winners' Cup	1R	(England) Chelsea	0–2	0–2	0–4
1999–2000	UEFA Champions League	2QR	(Cyprus) Anorthosis Famagusta	1–1	1–2	2–3
2000–01	UEFA Cup	Qualifying	(Georgia (country)) Locomotive Tbilisi	2–0	2–0	4–0
2000–01	UEFA Cup	1R	(Croatia) Dinamo Zagreb	0–3	1–1	1–3
2001–02	UEFA Cup	Qualifying	(Wales) Cwmbran Town	1–0	4–0	5–0
2001–02	UEFA Cup	1R	(Czech Republic) Slovan Liberec	1–0	0–2	1–2
2007	UEFA Intertoto Cup	1R	(Luxembourg) Differdange 03	3–0	2–0	5–0
2007	UEFA Intertoto Cup	2R	(Austria) Rapid Wien	1–0	1–3	2–3
2009–10	UEFA Champions League	2QR	(Bosnia and Herzegovina) Zrinjski Mostar	4–0	0–1	4–1
2009–10	UEFA Champions League	3QR	(Greece) Olympiacos	0–2	0–2	0–4
2009–10	UEFA Europa League	PO	(Netherlands) Ajax	1–2	0–5	1–7
2010–11	UEFA Europa League	3QR	(Serbia) Red Star Belgrade	1–1	2–1	3–2
2010–11	UEFA Europa League	PO	(Germany) VfB Stuttgart	0–1	2–2	2–3
2011–12	UEFA Champions League	2QR	(Kazakhstan) Tobol	2–0	1–1	3–1
2011–12	UEFA Champions League	3QR	(Cyprus) APOEL	0–2	0–0	0–2
2011–12	UEFA Europa League	PO	(Italy) Roma	1–0	1–1	2–1
2011–12	UEFA Europa League	Group F	(Spain) Athletic Bilbao	1–2	1–2	4th out of 4
2011–12	UEFA Europa League	Group F	(Austria) Red Bull Salzburg	2–3	0–3	4th out of 4
2011–12	UEFA Europa League	Group F	(France) Paris Saint-Germain	0–0	0–1	4th out of 4
2012–13	UEFA Europa League	2QR	(Hungary) Videoton	1–1	0–0	1–1 (a)
2013–14	UEFA Champions League	2QR	(Bulgaria) Ludogorets Razgrad	2–1	0–3	2–4
2014–15	UEFA Champions League	2QR	(Wales) The New Saints	1–0	2–0	3–0
2014–15	UEFA Champions League	3QR	(Moldova) Sheriff Tiraspol	2–1	0–0	2–1
2014–15	UEFA Champions League	PO	(Belarus) BATE Borisov	1–1	0–3	1–4
2014–15	UEFA Europa League	Group I	(Switzerland) Young Boys	1–3	0–5	4th out of 4
2014–15	UEFA Europa League	Group I	(Czech Republic) Sparta Prague	0–3	0–4	4th out of 4
2014–15	UEFA Europa League	Group I	(Italy) Napoli	0–2	0–3	4th out of 4
2015–16	UEFA Europa League	1QR	(Gibraltar) Europa	3–0	6–0	9–0
2015–16	UEFA Europa League	2QR	(Republic of Ireland) UCD	1–0	5–1	6–1
2015–16	UEFA Europa League	3QR	(Russia) Krasnodar	3–3	0–2	3–5
2016–17	UEFA Europa League	1QR	(Albania) Partizani	Canc.	0–0	w/o
2016–17	UEFA Europa League	2QR	(Latvia) Jelgava	0–0	0–3	0–3
2017–18	UEFA Europa League	1QR	(Armenia) Pyunik	5–0	4–1	9–1
2017–18	UEFA Europa League	2QR	(Denmark) Lyngby	0–1	1–2	1–3
2018–19	UEFA Europa League	1QR	(Moldova) Milsami Orhei	5–0; Attendance: 3,175	4–2	9–2
2018–19	UEFA Europa League	2QR	(Malta) Balzan	3–1; Attendance: 4,176	1–2	4–3
2018–19	UEFA Europa League	3QR	(Austria) Rapid Wien	2–1; Attendance: 9,563	0–4	2–5
2019–20	UEFA Champions League	1QR	(Montenegro) Sutjeska Nikšić	1–1; Attendance: 11,250	1–1 (a.e.t.)	2–2 (2–3 p)
2019–20	UEFA Europa League	2QR	(Kosovo) Feronikeli	2–1; Attendance: 7,150	2–0	4–1
2019–20	UEFA Europa League	3QR	(Republic of Ireland) Dundalk	1–0; Attendance: 9,980	3–1	4–1
2019–20	UEFA Europa League	PO	(Greece) PAOK	1–0; Attendance: 20,233	2–3	3–3 (a)
2019–20	UEFA Europa League	Group K	(Turkey) Beşiktaş	4–2; Attendance: 5,273 (Note: This match was officially played behind closed doors due to UEFA sanctions against the home team. However, under UEFA rules, children aged under 14 were still allowed to attend such matches free of charge, with one adult permitted entry for every 10 children to act as a supervisor.)	1–2	3rd out of 4
2019–20	UEFA Europa League	Group K	(Portugal) Braga	2–4; Attendance: 10,856	2–2	3rd out of 4
2019–20	UEFA Europa League	Group K	(England) Wolverhampton Wanderers	1–2; Attendance: 20,333 (Note: This match was officially played behind closed doors due to UEFA sanctions against the home team. However, under UEFA rules, children aged under 14 were still allowed to attend such matches free of charge, with one adult permitted entry for every 10 children to act as a supervisor.)	0–1	3rd out of 4
2020–21	UEFA Champions League	1QR	(Faroe Islands) KÍ	—N/a	0–3 (awd.) (Note: The first qualifying round match between KÍ and Slovan Bratislava, originally scheduled to be played on 19 August 2020, was postponed to 21 August 2020 due to one staff member from Slovan Bratislava testing positive for SARS-2 coronavirus and the whole team being put into quarantine by the Faroese authorities. As a result, Slovan Bratislava had to send new players, who were mostly from the reserve team. None of the original 18 players could play in the match. On 21 August, the match could not be played due to another player from Slovan Bratislava testing positive for SARS-2 coronavirus and the whole second team being put into quarantine by the Faroese authorities. On 24 August, KÍ were awarded a technical 3–0 victory by UEFA according to the regulations related to COVID-19.)	—N/a
2020–21	UEFA Europa League	2QR	(Finland) KuPS	—N/a	1–1 (3–4 p)	—N/a
2021–22	UEFA Champions League	1QR	(Republic of Ireland) Shamrock Rovers	2–0; Attendance: 500	1–2	3–2
2021–22	UEFA Champions League	2QR	(Switzerland) Young Boys	0–0; Attendance: 1,000	2–3	2–3
2021–22	UEFA Europa League	3QR	(Gibraltar) Lincoln Red Imps	1–1; Attendance: 4,688	3–1	4–2
2021–22	UEFA Europa League	PO	(Greece) Olympiacos	2–2; Attendance: 7,201	0–3	2–5
2021–22	UEFA Europa Conference League	Group F	(Denmark) Copenhagen	1–3; Attendance: 9,833	0–2	3rd out of 4
2021–22	UEFA Europa Conference League	Group F	(Greece) PAOK	0–0; Attendance: 0 (Note: Match played behind closed doors due to COVID-19 restrictions.)	1–1	3rd out of 4
2021–22	UEFA Europa Conference League	Group F	(Gibraltar) Lincoln Red Imps	2–0; Attendance: 6,108	4–1	3rd out of 4
2022–23	UEFA Champions League	1QR	(Georgia (country)) Dinamo Batumi	0–0; Attendance: 10,589	2–1 (a.e.t.)	2–1
2022–23	UEFA Champions League	2QR	(Hungary) Ferencváros	1–4; Attendance: 21,500	2–1	3−5
2022–23	UEFA Europa League	3QR	(Greece) Olympiacos	2–2 (a.e.t.); Attendance: 18,133	1–1	3–3 (3–4 p)
2022–23	UEFA Europa Conference League	PO	(Bosnia and Herzegovina) Zrinjski Mostar	2–1 (a.e.t.); Attendance: 14,333	0–1	2–2 (6–5 p)
2022–23	UEFA Europa Conference League	Group H	(Lithuania) Žalgiris	0–0; Attendance: 11,227	2–1	1st out of 4
2022–23	UEFA Europa Conference League	Group H	(Armenia) Pyunik	2–1; Attendance: 15,783	0–2	1st out of 4
2022–23	UEFA Europa Conference League	Group H	(Switzerland) Basel	3–3; Attendance: 20,233	2–0	1st out of 4
2022–23	UEFA Europa Conference League	R16	(Switzerland) Basel	2–2 (a.e.t.); Attendance: 21,675	2–2	4–4 (1–4 p)
2023–24	UEFA Champions League	1QR	(Luxembourg) Swift Hesperange	1–1; Attendance: 14,470	2–0	3–1
2023–24	UEFA Champions League	2QR	(Bosnia and Herzegovina) Zrinjski Mostar	2–2; Attendance: 20,498	1–0	3–2
2023–24	UEFA Champions League	3QR	(Israel) Maccabi Haifa	1–2; Attendance: 21,375	1–3	2−5
2023–24	UEFA Europa League	PO	(Cyprus) Aris Limassol	2–1; Attendance: 17,564	2–6	4–7
2023–24	UEFA Europa Conference League	Group A	(Faroe Islands) KÍ	2–1; Attendance: 12,454	2–1	2nd out of 4
2023–24	UEFA Europa Conference League	Group A	(Slovenia) Olimpija Ljubljana	1–2; Attendance: 14,387	1–0	2nd out of 4
2023–24	UEFA Europa Conference League	Group A	(France) Lille	1–1; Attendance: 21,544	1–2	2nd out of 4
2023–24	UEFA Europa Conference League	KPO	(Austria) Sturm Graz	0–1; Attendance: 19,870	1–4	1–5
2024–25	UEFA Champions League	1QR	(North Macedonia) Struga	4–2; Attendance: 11,259	2–1	6–3
2024–25	UEFA Champions League	2QR	(Slovenia) Celje	5−0; Attendance: 17,197	1−1	6–1
2024–25	UEFA Champions League	3QR	(Cyprus) APOEL	2−0; Attendance: 20,404	0−0	2–0
2024–25	UEFA Champions League	PO	(Denmark) Midtjylland	3−2; Attendance: 21,609	1−1	4–3
2024–25	UEFA Champions League	League phase	(Scotland) Celtic	—N/a	1–5	35th out of 36
2024–25	UEFA Champions League	League phase	(England) Manchester City	0–4; Attendance: 22,500	—N/a	35th out of 36
2024–25	UEFA Champions League	League phase	(Spain) Girona	—N/a	0–2	35th out of 36
2024–25	UEFA Champions League	League phase	(Croatia) Dinamo Zagreb	1–4; Attendance: 22,132	—N/a	35th out of 36
2024–25	UEFA Champions League	League phase	(Italy) Milan	2–3; Attendance: 22,500	—N/a	35th out of 36
2024–25	UEFA Champions League	League phase	(Spain) Atlético Madrid	—N/a	1–3	35th out of 36
2024–25	UEFA Champions League	League phase	(Germany) VfB Stuttgart	1–3; Attendance: 22,500	—N/a	35th out of 36
2024–25	UEFA Champions League	League phase	(Germany) Bayern Munich	—N/a	1–3	35th out of 36
2025–26	UEFA Champions League	2QR	(Bosnia and Herzegovina) Zrinjski Mostar	4−0; Attendance: 18,257	2−2	6–2
2025–26	UEFA Champions League	3QR	(Kazakhstan) Kairat	1–0 (a.e.t.); Attendance: 21,005	0–1	1–1 (3–4 p)
2025–26	UEFA Europa League	PO	(Switzerland) Young Boys	0–1; Attendance: 15,008	2–3	2–4
2025–26	UEFA Conference League	League phase	(France) Strasbourg	1–2; Attendance: 15,204	—N/a	29th out of 36
2025–26	UEFA Conference League	League phase	(Netherlands) AZ	—N/a	0–1	29th out of 36
2025–26	UEFA Conference League	League phase	(Finland) KuPS	—N/a	1–3	29th out of 36
2025–26	UEFA Conference League	League phase	(Spain) Rayo Vallecano	2–1; Attendance: 16,502	—N/a	29th out of 36
2025–26	UEFA Conference League	League phase	(North Macedonia) Shkëndija	—N/a	0–2	29th out of 36
2025–26	UEFA Conference League	League phase	(Sweden) BK Häcken	1–0; Attendance: 7,879	—N/a	29th out of 36
2026–27	UEFA Champions League	2QR	(Georgia (country)) Iberia 1999	1–1; Attendance: 17,867	2–0	3–1
2026–27	UEFA Champions League	3QR	(Sweden) Mjällby AIF	2–0; Attendance: 21,350	2–1	4–1
2026–27	UEFA Champions League	PO	(Slovenia) Celje	1–1; Attendance: 21,640	2–1	3–2
2026–27	UEFA Champions League	League phase	(France) Paris Saint-Germain	—N/a	1–6	
2026–27	UEFA Champions League	League phase	(Germany) VfB Stuttgart	0–3; Attendance: 19,725	—N/a	
2026–27	UEFA Champions League	League phase	(Italy) Roma	—N/a	0–4	
2026–27	UEFA Champions League	League phase	(Austria) LASK	—N/a		
2026–27	UEFA Champions League	League phase	(Spain) Real Betis		—N/a	
2026–27	UEFA Champions League	League phase	(Ukraine) Shakhtar Donetsk		—N/a	
2026–27	UEFA Champions League	League phase	(France) Lille	—N/a		
2026–27	UEFA Champions League	League phase	(Italy) Internazionale		—N/a	

== Non UEFA-administered competition ==
Season	Competition	Round	Opponent	Home	Away
1968	Intertoto Cup	Group B3	(Sweden) Malmö FF	0–1	2–1
1968	Intertoto Cup	Group B3	(Austria) Wiener Sport-Club	3–1	4–0
1968	Intertoto Cup	Group B3	(West Germany) Hamburger SV	1–0	5–4
1970	Intertoto Cup	Group A	(West Germany) Borussia Dortmund	2–1	2–0
1970	Intertoto Cup	Group A	(Belgium) Standard Liège	3–1	2–2
1970	Intertoto Cup	Group A	(Sweden) Malmö FF	2–2	1–4
1972	Intertoto Cup	Group 5	(Austria) First Vienna	5–0	1–0
1972	Intertoto Cup	Group 5	(Switzerland) Zürich	0–3	3–1
1972	Intertoto Cup	Group 5	(Sweden) Djurgårdens IF	4–1	2–3
1973	Intertoto Cup	Group 3	(Netherlands) PSV Eindhoven	1–0	1–0
1973	Intertoto Cup	Group 3	(Sweden) AIK	0–0	1–1
1973	Intertoto Cup	Group 3	(West Germany) MSV Duisburg	1–0	2–0
1974	Intertoto Cup	Group 5	(Switzerland) Grasshoppers	4–0	1–0
1974	Intertoto Cup	Group 5	(West Germany) 1. FC Kaiserslautern	1–0	0–1
1974	Intertoto Cup	Group 5	(Sweden) Åtvidabergs FF	1–0	2–0
1977	Intertoto Cup	Group 8	(West Germany) Hertha BSC	2–1	0–3
1977	Intertoto Cup	Group 8	(Denmark) Boldklubben 1903	3–1	1–1
1977	Intertoto Cup	Group 8	(Austria) Admira Vienna	5–1	5–1
1990	Intertoto Cup	Group 4	(Sweden) Vejle Boldklub	5–1	0–1
1990	Intertoto Cup	Group 4	(Hungary) MTK Budapest	2–0	2–0
1990	Intertoto Cup	Group 4	(Sweden) IFK Norrköping	7–0	1–1
1991	Intertoto Cup	Group 1	(Switzerland) Neuchâtel Xamax	0–2	2–2
1991	Intertoto Cup	Group 1	(Sweden) Malmö FF	1–1	2–2
1991	Intertoto Cup	Group 1	(Hungary) Tatabányai Bányász	4–1	1–2
1992	Intertoto Cup	Group 7	(Denmark) Aarhus Gymnastikforening	2–2	0–2
1992	Intertoto Cup	Group 7	(Hungary) Vaci Izzo	5–1	3–2
1992	Intertoto Cup	Group 7	(Sweden) Kiruna FF	5–2	3–2
1993	Intertoto Cup	Group 6	(Austria) Tirol Innsbruck	2–2	
1993	Intertoto Cup	Group 6	(Switzerland) Zürich	2–4	
1993	Intertoto Cup	Group 6	(Denmark) Silkeborg	2–1	
1993	Intertoto Cup	Group 6	(Germany) VfL Bochum	2–1	
1994	Intertoto Cup	Group 6	(Czech Republic) Slavia Prague	4–2	
1994	Intertoto Cup	Group 6	(Switzerland) Servette	1–2	
1994	Intertoto Cup	Group 6	(Denmark) Brøndby	1–1	
1994	Intertoto Cup	Group 6	(Austria) Admira Wacker	3–0	

== UEFA ranking ==
UEFA coefficient ranking as of 7 June 2026:

Rank	Team	Coefficient
63	(Spain) Athletic Bilbao	38.750
64	(Czech Republic) Sparta Prague	38.250
65	(Slovakia) Slovan Bratislava	36.000
66	(France) Rennes	35.000
67	(Switzerland) Basel	34.500

- Full list

== See also ==
- Slovak football clubs in European competitions
