= Kravany nad Dunajom =

Kravany nad Dunajom Karva
- Municipality
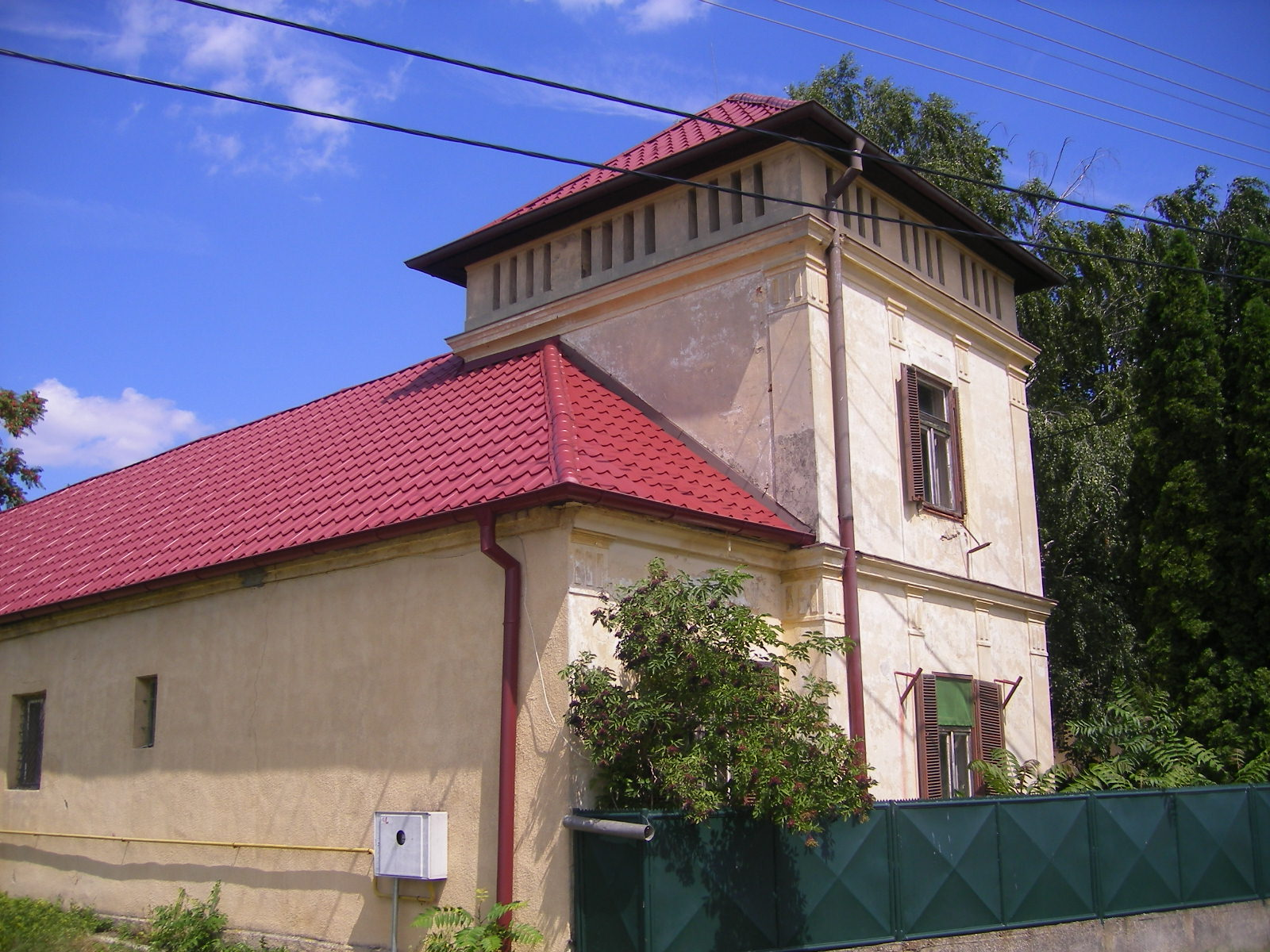
- Szarvassy manor

- Flag Coat of arms

- Location of Kravany nad Dunajom in the Nitra Region Location of Kravany nad Dunajom in Slovakia
- Coordinates: 47.77°N 18.48°E
- Country: Slovakia
- Region: Nitra Region
- District: Komárno District
- First mentioned: 1245

Government
  - Mayor: Gábor Duka

Area
  - Total: 15.90 km^{2} (6.14 sq mi)
- Elevation: 107 m (351 ft)

Population (2025)
  - Total: 704
- Time zone: UTC+1 (CET)
  - Summer (DST): UTC+2 (CEST)
- Postal code: 946 36
- Area code: +421 35
- Vehicle registration plate (until 2022): KN
- Website: www.kravany.com

Kravany nad Dunajom (Hungarian: Karva) is a village and municipality in the Komárno District in the Nitra Region of south-west Slovakia.

== Geography ==
The municipality lies at an altitude of 107 metres (351 ft) and covers an area of 15.90 km^{2} (6.14 sq mi) (2025).

== History ==
In the 9th century, the territory of Kravany nad Dunajom became part of the Kingdom of Hungary. In historical records the village was first mentioned in 1245. After the Austro-Hungarian army disintegrated in November 1918, Czechoslovak troops occupied the area, later acknowledged internationally by the Treaty of Trianon. Between 1938 and 1945 Kravany nad Dunajom once more became part of Miklós Horthy's Hungary through the First Vienna Award. From 1945 until the Velvet Divorce, it was part of Czechoslovakia. Since then it has been part of Slovakia.

== Population ==
Population statistic (10 years)
| Year | 1995 | 2005 | 2015 | 2025 |
|---|---|---|---|---|
| Count | 773 | 758 | 729 | 704 |
| Difference | | −1.94% | −3.82% | −3.42% |

Population statistic
| Year | 2024 | 2025 |
|---|---|---|
| Count | 703 | 704 |
| Difference | | +0.14% |

It has a population of 704 people (31 December 2025).

=== Ethnicity ===
Census 2021 (1+ %)
| Ethnicity | Number | Fraction |
|---|---|---|
| Hungarian | 578 | 80.5% |
| Slovak | 146 | 20.33% |
| Not found out | 37 | 5.15% |
| Total | 718 | |

In year 2021 was 718 people by ethnicity 578 as Hungarian, 146 as Slovak, 37 as Not found out, 6 as Czech, 4 as Moravian, 2 as Other and 1 as Croatian.

Note on population: The difference values of population numbers in the table "Population statistic" and in the sections "Ethnicity" & "Religion" is caused by the use of various statistical methods.

=== Religion ===
Census 2021 (1+ %)
| Religion | Number | Fraction |
|---|---|---|
| Roman Catholic Church | 442 | 61.56% |
| None | 180 | 25.07% |
| Calvinist Church | 47 | 6.55% |
| Not found out | 27 | 3.76% |
| Evangelical Church | 8 | 1.11% |
| Total | 718 | |

In year 2021 was 718 people by religion 442 from Roman Catholic Church, 180 from None, 47 from Calvinist Church, 27 from Not found out, 8 from Evangelical Church, 4 from Jehovah's Witnesses, 4 from Other, 2 from Greek Catholic Church, 1 from Old Catholic Church, 1 from Eastern Orthodox Church, 1 from Other and not ascertained christian church and 1 from Ad hoc movements.

== Sights ==
- Church of Holy Mary - The specialty of Kravany nad Dunajom is the late-Romanesque church built around 1232, dedicated to Saint Lawrence. The most valuable monument in the church are the two red marble tombstones from 1400.
- The wooden Belfry - Because the local Roman Catholic church was built without a tower, a wooden belfry was erected in the old cemetery in the 18th century. Today's belfry in front of the church was built in 1926. The lower part is masonry, the upper part is made of plank, its pyramid-shaped tin roof ends with a cross. Two bronze bells hang in the belfry today. One was a gift from Kravany nad Dunajom believers and was cast by the Fischer brothers in Trnava in 1920. The second one was made by Lőrinc Welner in 1928, during the activity of priest Imre Ambrík, with the largest donation from János Szota. These bells replaced the previous ones, which were confiscated for military purposes (cannon casting) during World War I.
- The Chapel dedicated to the Blessed Virgin Mary of Lourdes - it is in the near to the mansion of the family Hroššo.
- The former castle of the family Láng - Next to the mansion of the Hroššo family, we find the largest castle in the village, built in the last quarter of the 19th century by Sándor Braun and his wife, Józsa Hazai. In 1899, István Kobek bought the castle from them, then in 1905 it was acquired by Dr. Kálmán Fodor and his wife, Countess Jozefína Berchtold, and after 1910 by dr. Tibor Weszely and his wife, Baroness Jeanne Baich, lived in it. In 1917, the estate and the castle were bought by Gusztáv Láng, and the building was rebuilt and unified in the Art Nouveau style. He used the building as a summer residence. This was also confiscated in 1945, and since 1953 it has housed by the Agricultural School. The original castle consisted of two L-shaped ground-floor buildings, their main facade connected by a wooden-pillared corridor from the courtyard. With the reconstruction, the castle was unified by Gusztáv Láng, when the original two-storey water tower also became an entrance building. The floor was only built on it in the 1950s and the original architectural character of the building has been preserved. The smooth facades of the building are divided into windows by three starting stones in rectangular window frames, the corners are decorated with log rustic. Part of the garden facade ends with a straight attic with a former terrace decorated with teeth. In the courtyard of the castle there is a stylish technical building and a stone border of the well from the end of the 19th century.
- The former castle of the family Szarvassy - In the western part of the village, next to the Danube bank, is the castle, which was probably built by the Missics family, in the second half of the 18th century. In the first half of the 19th century, the property fell into the hands of the Collectors, from whom it was bought by the owner Fridmann. From him in 1890 Sándor Szarvassy bought the estate and the castle, then in 1894 it was renovated and rebuilt in a romantic style. There was an extensive park next to the castle. After his death, until 1942, his son, Imre Szarvassy, owned the castle. Since 1959, the agricultural school has been operating in the renovated and expanded building.
- The former mansion of the family Bottka - Today's Mary area was bought around 1880 by dr. Gyula Szőke is a professor from Budapest and he built a small mansion as a summer residence. In 1929, Pál Bottka and his wife, Ilona Esküdt, bought the estate and the mansion from the Szőkés and rebuilt it to its present form by adding terraces.
- The former mansion of the family Hroššo - Next to the embankment of the Danube stands an insignificant building with a history worth mentioning. After the demolition of the Nedeczky mansion, Count Ferenc Gyulay had a two-story baroque castle worthy of a prince (according to Helischer) built on this site after 1710. Later the castle was built by his son Ferenc Gyulay II. At the end of the 18th century, József Kondé Benedek had a one-storey classicist mansion built on the site of the demolished castle. He acquired the estate here through his marriage to Franciska Ujlaky. The wife's mother was Ilona Nedeczky, who married Ferenc Ujlaky. According to Helischer, the building provides a comfortable apartment for its owner in all respects. The area of the mansion was bounded by a fence. Next to the building was a smaller ornamental park, which Kondé was constantly enriched with new exotic, special plants. After his death in 1831, the mansion became the property of the Nedeczky family, who donated it to Károly Palkovics. The building was also shown on a military map of Kravany nad Dunajom from 1782. In 1893 the mansion became the property of the Bakay family together with the estate, in 1904 it was sold to Labud Kosztics, who was part of an anti-imperial conspiracy and therefore fled from Yugoslavia to Hungary. The new owner extended the building with a side wing, which thus became U-shaped. In 1935, the estate and mansion were purchased by Michal Hroššo from Kuzmicz. In 1949, both the estate and the mansion were confiscated and given to the local state estate. In 1990, the Hroššo family recovered their property through compensation proceedings, but since the new state-owned office building was built, the mansion building has been vacant.

== Actively ==
- The stone statue of St. John Nepomuk - On the Danube embankment, opposite the castle of the Kuzmik family, stands a stone statue of St. John Nepomuk, made in 1843 and renovated in 1902. The statue stands on a marble pedestal.
- Promenade of Kravany nad Dunajom - Kravany without exaggeration is an active tourist center of the area. However, for settlements along the bicycle route EUROVELO6, it is not only for those who arrive by bicycle to visit. The most outstanding event of the settlement is Bicycle Marathon between Kravany - Lábatlan and the International Meeting of recumbent bicycle
- Lockout Tower of Kravany nad Dunajom - The Kravany Danube promenade has a magnificent 16-meter-high look-out tower to admire the Danube and the surrounding area, next to it, is a charming park they have been built for bikers to relax. When its warm, a great program is the beach, the place is excellent for bathing, and the many shells prove the excellent water quality. During the summer, there is a small boat transporting between Kravany and Lábatlan on Danube.
- Educational trail in Kravany nad Dunajom - In Kravany nad Dunajom there is also an educational trail, which presents attractions on the Danube coast in a section of 1.5 km, together on 10 boards.
- The Natur Park in Kravany nad Dunajom - The nature park next to the castle of the family Láng was established at the turn of the 19th and 20th centuries.
- Sightseeing tour by boat in Kravany nad Dunajom - During the summer, there is a small boat transporting between Kravany and Lábatlan on Danube.

== Facilities ==
The village has a public library, a gym and a football pitch.
