= Jack Watkins (basketball) =

American basketball and baseball player

Personal information
- Born: October 27, 1923 Drumright, Oklahoma, U.S.
- Died: May 22, 1998 (aged 74) Tecumseh, Oklahoma, U.S.
- Listed height: 6 ft 2 in (1.88 m)
- Listed weight: 180 lb (82 kg)

Career information
- High school: Tribbey (Tribbey, Oklahoma)
- College: Oklahoma (1946–1947)
- NBA draft: 1947: undrafted
- Position: Guard

Career history
- 1947–1948: Oklahoma City Drillers
- 1948–1949: Sheboygan Red Skins
- 1949: Montgomery Rebels

Jack Austin Watkins (October 27, 1923 – May 22, 1998) was an American professional basketball and minor league baseball player. He played in the National Basketball League for the Sheboygan Red Skins during the 1948–49 season and averaged 0.7 points per game. In baseball, he played during the 1948 season for the Montgomery Rebels in the Southeastern League.

Watkins served in the Marine Corps during World War II. Upon returning, he played baseball and basketball at the University of Oklahoma, where in 1946–47 he appeared in the 1947 NCAA basketball tournament as the Sooners advanced to the national championship game before losing to Holy Cross, 58–47.
