= Ján Čapkovič =

Slovak footballer

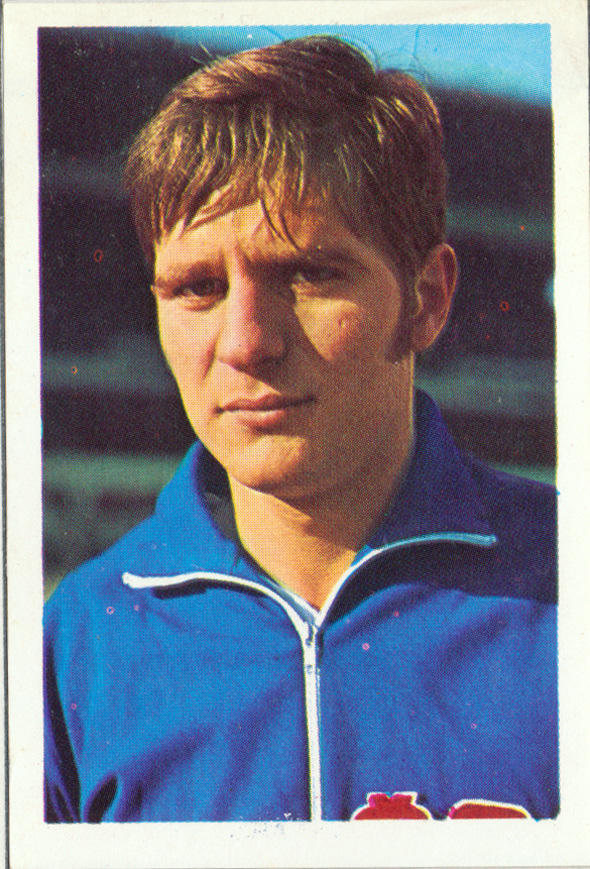
- Čapkovič at the 1970 FIFA World Cup

Personal information
- Date of birth: 11 January 1948 (age 78)
- Place of birth: Bratislava, Czechoslovakia
- Position: Striker

Youth career
- 1956–1967: ČH Bratislava

Senior career*
Years	Team	Apps	(Gls)
1967–1977	Slovan Bratislava	287	(100)
1977–1983	ČH Bratislava		

International career
1968–1974	Czechoslovakia	20	(6)
1968–1975	Czechoslovakia Olympic	4	(2)
- * Club domestic league appearances and goals

Ján Čapkovič (born 11 January 1948) is a former Slovak football player. The scorer of 100 goals in the Czechoslovak First League, he also scored the winning goal for Slovan Bratislava in the 1969 European Cup Winners' Cup final. Internationally he played for Czechoslovakia, scoring 6 times in 20 appearances and taking part in the 1970 FIFA World Cup.

== Club career ==
A left winger, Čapkovič joined ČH Bratislava in 1956, subsequently playing in youth leagues. He joined Slovan Bratislava in April 1967. He won the Czechoslovak Cup in the 1967–68 season. In the 1968–69 European Cup Winners' Cup he scored in both legs of the semi-final against Dunfermline Athletic which Slovan won 2–1 on aggregate, helping his side to the 1969 European Cup Winners' Cup final. In the final he scored Slovan's third goal as they beat Barcelona by a score of 3–2. Čapkovič celebrated his first league championship with his club in 1969–70. In the 1971–72 season he was the top scorer of the First League with 19 goals. In 1973–74 Slovan did the double of winning the 1973–74 Czechoslovak First League and the Czechoslovak Cup. He won his third league title in 1974–75.

He scored his 99th and 100th league goals in a 5–0 Slovan Bratislava win against ZVL Žilina in April 1977. Čapkovič finished his First League career in 1977 with 100 goals in 287 Czechoslovak First League appearances.

== International career ==
Čapkovič made his debut for Czechoslovakia on 25 September 1968 in a match against Denmark. He played at the 1970 FIFA World Cup in Mexico. He scored four goals in UEFA Euro 1972 qualifying, although Czechoslovakia finished second behind Romania and did not qualify for the final tournament. In total, he played 20 matches and scored 6 goals for Czechoslovakia. He also played for the Czechoslovakia Olympic team on four occasions, scoring twice.

== Personal life ==
Čapkovič was born in Bratislava's Petržalka borough to father Ľudovít and mother Mária. His twin brother Jozef was also a successful footballer.

== Career statistics ==
List of international goals scored by Ján Čapkovič
No.	Date	Venue	Opponent	Score	Result	Competition	Ref
1	21 April 1971	Vetch Field, Swansea, Wales	Wales	1–1	3–1	UEFA Euro 1972 qualification	
2	21 April 1971	Vetch Field, Swansea, Wales	Wales	3–1	3–1	UEFA Euro 1972 qualification	
3	16 June 1971	Helsinki Olympic Stadium, Helsinki, Finland	Finland	1–0	4–0	UEFA Euro 1972 qualification	
4	14 November 1971	Bucharest, Romania	Romania	1–1	1–2	UEFA Euro 1972 qualification	
5	26 April 1972	Stadion města Plzně, Plzeň, Czechoslovakia	Luxembourg	2–0	6–0	Friendly	
6	26 April 1972	Stadion města Plzně, Plzeň, Czechoslovakia	Luxembourg	4–0	6–0	Friendly	

== Honours ==
Slovan Bratislava

- Czechoslovak First League: 1969–70, 1973–74, 1974–75
- Czechoslovak Cup: 1967–68, 1973–74
- UEFA Cup Winners' Cup: 1968–69

Individual

- Czechoslovak First League Top Scorer: 1971–72
