= Petro Punna =

Finnish sports executive and former footballer (born 1974)

Personal information
- Date of birth: 13 February 1974 (age 52)
- Place of birth: Lieto, Finland
- Height: 1.86 m (6 ft 1 in)
- Position: Defensive midfielder

Youth career
- Jyväskylän Palloilijat

Senior career*
Years	Team	Apps	(Gls)
1993–1996	JJK	59	(3)
1997–1998	TPS	19	(1)
1999	Inter Turku	19	(1)
2000	MYPA	0	(0)

Managerial career
- 2013–2014: JJK (chief executive officer)
- 2024: TPS (chief executive officer)
- * Club domestic league appearances and goals as of 31 August 2024

Petro Punna (born 13 February 1974) is a Finnish sports executive and a former professional footballer, who played as a midfielder. Punna was most recently the chief executive officer of his former club Turun Palloseura (TPS). During his playing career, he played for JJK Jyväskylä, and made a total of 38 appearances scoring two goals in Veikkausliiga for TPS and Inter Turku.
