= Thomas Fraser (New Zealand cricketer) =

New Zealand cricketer (1917–1998)

Personal information
- Full name: Thomas Campbell Fraser
- Born: 29 October 1917; Dunedin, New Zealand
- Died: 20 May 1998 (aged 80); Dunedin, New Zealand
- Batting: Right-handed
- Bowling: Right-arm slow-medium

Domestic team information
- Years: Team
- 1937/38–1952/53: Otago
- Source: ESPNcricinfo, 10 May 2016

Thomas Campbell Fraser (29 October 1917 – 20 May 1998) was a New Zealand cricketer. He played fourteen first-class matches for Otago between the 1937–38 season and 1952–53 season.

Fraser was born at Dunedin in 1917 and worked as the managing director of a company. Following his death in 1997 obituaries were published in the New Zealand Cricket Almanack and, the following year, in Wisden.
