= Joe Petro III =

Joe Petro III.
- Born: May 3, 1956 (age 69); Lexington, Kentucky, USA

Joe Petro III (born May 3, 1956) is a second-generation fine artist who works as a sculptor in bronze, clay and printmaking on silk-screen and handmade paper. He majored in Zoology at the University of Tennessee, Knoxville. He worked with Kurt Vonnegut Jr in Vonnegut's later years on silk-screen prints of Vonnegut's artwork.
