= Jozef Baláži =

Slovak footballer and manager

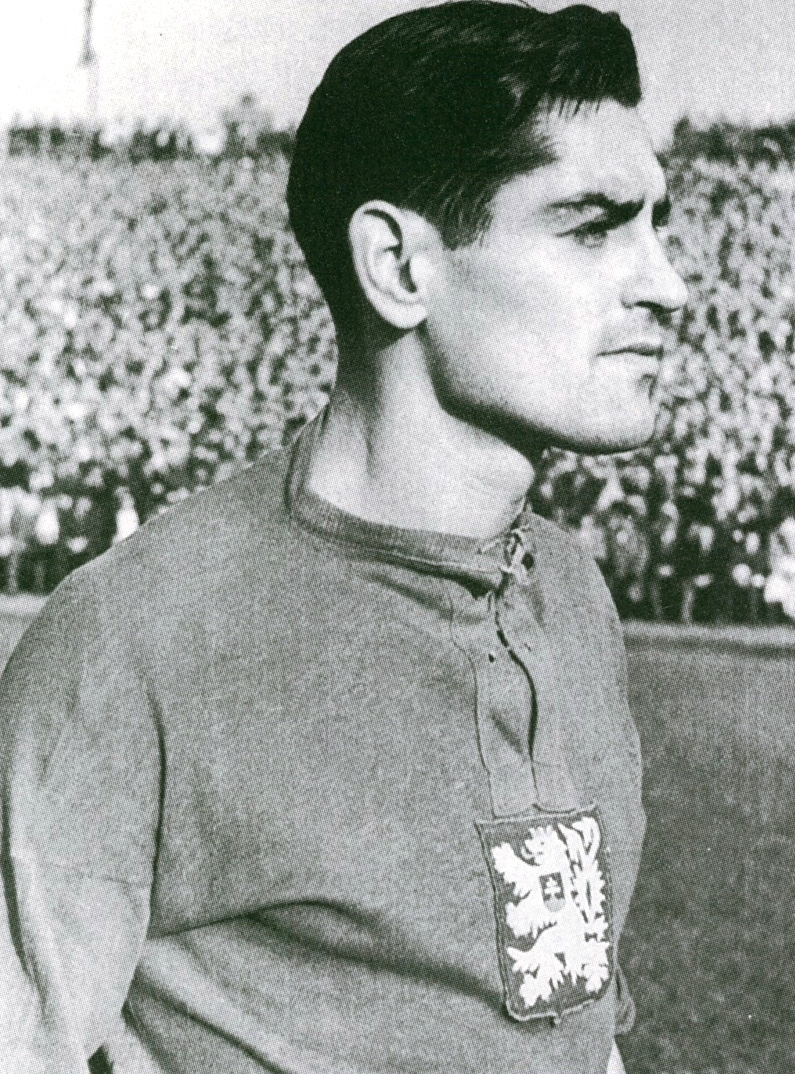
- Jozef Baláži in 1947

Personal information
- Date of birth: 2 November 1919
- Date of death: 30 May 1998 (aged 78)
- Position: Midfielder

Senior career*
Years	Team	Apps	(Gls)
- OAP Bratislava
1945–1953	ŠK Bratislava		

International career
1943	Slovakia	2	(1)
1947	Czechoslovakia	3	(1)

Managerial career
- 1958: Slovan Bratislava
- * Club domestic league appearances and goals

Jozef Baláži, also spelled Jozef Balázsy (2 November 1919 – 30 May 1998) was a Slovak football player and manager.

He played for ŠK Bratislava and OAP Bratislava. He managed Slovak Bratislava in 1958.
