= Gulberg =

Gulberg or Gulbarg means "rose petal" in Persian and may refer to:

- Gulberg Town, Karachi, town in Karachi, Sindh, Pakistan
- Gulberg, Faisalabad, place in Faisalabad, Punjab, Pakistan
- Gulberg, Lahore, neighbourhood in Lahore, Punjab, Pakistan
- Gulbarg Society, neighbourhood in Ahmedabad, Gujarat, India; site of the Gulbarg Society massacre during the 2002 Gujarat riots
- Gulbarga or Kalaburagi, city in Karnataka, India
