= Ľudovít Dubovský =

Czechoslovak footballer

Personal information
- Date of birth: 15 November 1918
- Place of birth: Bratislava, Czechoslovakia
- Date of death: 24 May 1998 (aged 79)
- Position: Striker

Senior career*
Years	Team	Apps	(Gls)
1941	OAP Bratislava		
1942	Kabel Bratislava		
1948	Sokol Ostrava		

International career
1941–1942	Slovakia	2	(0)
1948	Czechoslovakia	1	(0)
- * Club domestic league appearances and goals

Ľudovít Dubovský (15 November 1918 – 24 May 1998) was a footballer who played international football for both Slovakia and Czechoslovakia. He played as a striker for OAP Bratislava, Kabel Bratislava and Sokol Ostrava.
