= Michal Vičan =

Slovak footballer and manager

Personal information
- Date of birth: 26 March 1925
- Place of birth: Hlohovec, Czechoslovakia
- Date of death: 27 January 1986 (aged 60)
- Place of death: Bratislava, Czechoslovakia
- Position: Defender

Senior career*
Years	Team	Apps	(Gls)
1945–1957	Slovan Bratislava	231	

International career
1947–1952	Czechoslovakia	10	(0)

Managerial career
- 1965–1968: Jednota Trenčín
- 1968–1971: Slovan Bratislava
- 1971–1976: Ruch Chorzów
- 1976–1977: Slovan Bratislava
- 1978–1980: Inter Bratislava
- 1980–1981: Aris Thessaloniki
- 1982–1983: Slovan Bratislava
- 1983–1984: TTS Trenčín
- 1984–1986: Inter Bratislava
- * Club domestic league appearances and goals

Michal Vičan (26 March 1925 – 27 January 1986) was a Slovak football player and manager who led Slovan Bratislava to victory in the UEFA Cup Winners' Cup in the 1969 final against FC Barcelona.

As a player, he capped 10 times between 1947 and 1952 for Czechoslovakia.

== Honours ==
=== Manager ===
Slovan Bratislava

- Czechoslovak First League: 1969–70
- Czechoslovak Cup: 1967–68
- UEFA Cup Winners' Cup: 1968–69

Ruch Chorzów

- Ekstraklasa: 1973–74, 1974–75
- Polish Cup: 1973–74
