= Venkatesh Kulkarni =

Indian-American novelist

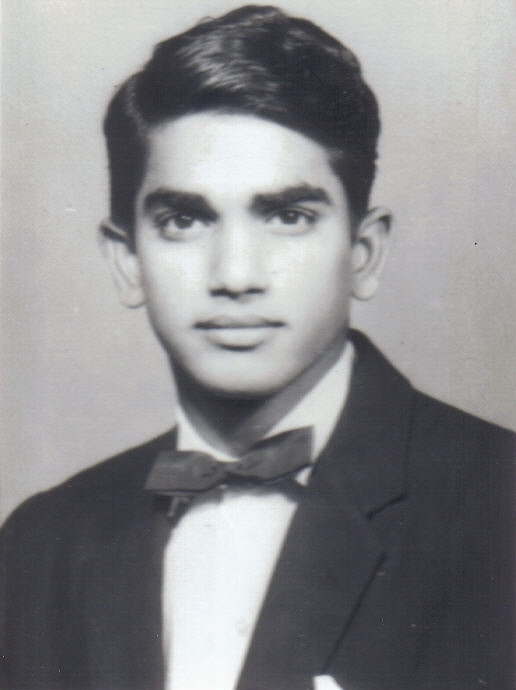
- Born: 1945; Hyderabad, India
- Died: May 3, 1998 (aged 52–53); Houston, Texas, U.S.
- Education: Osmania University (MA)
- Occupations: Novelist and academic
- Spouse: Margaret Preston
- Children: 4, including Sri Preston Kulkarni
- Writing career
- Notable work: Naked in Deccan
- Notable awards: American Book Award (1984)

Venkatesh Srinivas Kulkarni (1945 – May 3, 1998) was an Indian-American novelist and academic.

== Early life and education ==
Kulkarni was born in India and graduated from university at age 17. He was originally scheduled to go to medical school, but the admissions counselors at the institution asked him to come back when he was older. Kulkarni graduated with a master's degree from Osmania University at the age of 19. He undertook further studies at Cambridge University, the University of Moscow, the University of Heidelberg, the Sorbonne, and Tulane University.

== Career ==
Kulkarni became a Rotary International fellow and came to the United States. A member of the U.S. Cabinet asked Kulkarni to apply for U.S. citizenship.

His first novel, Naked in Deccan (1983), won the 1984 American Book Award of the Before Columbus Foundation and was listed among the top ten novels of the decade by the Chicago Tribune. In the book, Kulkarni describes Deccan, a region of India, as a “landscape lined with stretchmarks of fate masquerading as cart-driven paths deeply embedded in the dark earth”. The story is set in the feudal caste system and has no heroes or villains. Human beings demonstrate weaknesses and passions; some demonstrate moral strength and some do not.

For twelve years until his death, Kulkarni taught creative writing at Rice University in Houston. Kulkarni's students included Kathi Appelt and John Odam.

== Death and legacy ==
In 1997, he had a late diagnosis of leukemia and despite prolonged treatment at the MD Anderson Cancer Center in Houston, died on May 3, 1998.

He left two unfinished books, Allah Baksh - The Man Eaten By God, and The Modern American Apollo.

A Teaching Prize has been named for him by Rice University.

== Awards ==
- 1984 American Book Award for Naked in Deccan

== Family ==
Kulkarni was married to his wife, Margaret, and had four children: Sri, Silas, Margo, and Kris. His son, Sri Preston Kulkarni, was the Democratic candidate for Texas's 22nd congressional district in the United States House of Representatives in 2018 and 2020.

== Works ==
- Naked in Deccan: a novel. Stemmer House. December 1983. ISBN 978-0-88045-030-0.
