= Anatoliy Kabayda =

Soviet community activist (1912–1998)

Anatoly Kabayda (Russian: Анатолій Кабайда; also known as Anatoly Zhukivskii (Russian: Анатолій Жуківський) and Medved (Russian: Медвідь, lit. 'the bear'); 13 October 1912 – 28 May 1998) was a Ukrainian community and political activist.

== Youth ==
Kabayda was born in the village of Pyharivka, Novhorod-Siverskyi (Chernigov Governorate). He emigrated with his parents to Poland, settling in Volyn where he completed his high school education in Lutsk, and continued studying architecture in Danzig (now the city of Gdańsk) from 1933 to 1937. Kabayda joined the Organization of Ukrainian Nationalists in 1929 in Lutsk, becoming a cell leader. On return from his studies he joined the Ukrainian Insurgent Army.

== Activities during WWII ==
During the Nazi occupation of Ukraine, because of his fluent command of German, Kabayda was given the task of collecting intelligence in Kyiv by Taras Bulba-Borovetz. In Kyiv he fell into favour with the Germans initially as a translator then later becoming an officer in the occupational police. Kabayda became one of the organizers behind the formation of the Kyiv kuren. Later this formation joined up with the Bukovyna kuren in October 1941. From this combined group were formed detachments which became the Kyiv occupational police, the Hilfspolizei, later the Schutzpolizei. In August 1942 Kabayda became their commander.

The Schutzpolizei normally wore German uniforms, but for a short period at their formation wore Ukrainian insignia. In January 1942 the Ukrainian insignia was disallowed. Some members wore Soviet army uniforms with their insignia removed.

It is alleged that the Kyiv kuren was involved with the massacre of Jews at Babi Yar. Vitaly Korotych, editor of the prominent Moscow-based magazine Ogonyok, in a film about Babi Yar (1987) stated that "Vasyl" [sic] Kabayda was "responsible for the massacre of the Jews". It is unclear in what capacity Kabayda may have been involved, as he took command of the Schutzpolizei in August 1942, and the massacre taken place September 29/30 1941. On 11 September 1942, Kabayda rewarded a subordinate with a food ration for "apprehending a Jew while off-duty".

In 1945 Kabayda later had a position as an adjutant to General Pavlo Shandruk in the command of the First Division of the Ukrainian National Army, which incorporated the SS Division Galizien.

== Emigration ==
In Germany, Kabayda took on the surname Zukiwskyj (his mother's maiden name). He emigrated to Australia in 1949, initially living in Sydney. There he was prominent in the Ukrainian Scout movement known as Plast, and was one of the founders of the Union of Ukrainian Combatants in Australia. In 1961 he moved to Canberra where he was active in the Ukrainian community.

== Awards ==
The government of the Ukrainian National Republic in Exile awarded Kabayda with the Army Cross, and the Cross of the Ukrainian Army. He holds the title of Colonel. He also has the Plast order of St. George in Gold.

== Other information ==
Kabayda's sister lives in Ukraine where she was a curator in the Ivan Franko room at the Lviv National University. He has four children who are prominent community activists in Australia.
