= Nicolai N. Petro =

American academic (born 1958)

Nicolai N. Petro (born 1958) is a Professor of Political Science at the University of Rhode Island, in the United States. He also served as the US State Department's special assistant for policy on the Soviet Union under President George HW Bush. He is currently a senior Washington Fellow at the Institute for Peace & Diplomacy (IPD), a North American foreign affairs think tank.

== Life and professional career ==
Petro received his B.A. summa cum laude in history in 1980, M.A. in public administration in 1982, and Ph.D. in foreign affairs in 1984 all from the University of Virginia. His first full-time teaching appointment was at the Monterey Institute of International Studies, where in 1987 he founded the Center for Contemporary Russian Studies.

In 1989 and 1990, as an International Affairs fellow of the Council on Foreign Relations, he served as special assistant for policy in the Office of Soviet Union Affairs in the U.S. Department of State, and as temporary political attache at the U.S. Embassy in Moscow. While in the Soviet Union he monitored local elections in central Russia, Belarus, and Latvia. In 2001-2002 he returned to Russia privately to serve as staff consultant to the municipal research and training center Dialog, and advisor to the mayor of the Russian city of Veliky Novgorod.

His postdoctoral awards include two Fulbright awards (one to Russia in 1996-1997 and one to Ukraine in 2013-2014), a Thornton D. Hooper International Affairs Fellowship at the Foreign Policy Research Institute, as well as research awards from the National Council for Eurasian and East European Research, the Kennan Institute for Advanced Russian Studies in Washington, D.C., and the Hoover Institution at Stanford University. From 2017-2019 he held the University of Rhode Island's biennial Silvia-Chandley Professorship of Nonviolence and Peace Studies. In the spring of 2021 he was a Visiting Fellow at the Institute for Advanced Studies at the University of Bologna in Italy.

In 1997 Novgorod State University awarded him an honorary doctorate for "great merit in the development of the University and an outstanding contribution to the Science, Culture and Education of the Land of Novgorod." In 2007, 2013, 2014, and 2015 he participated in the Valdai Discussion Club, a Moscow-based think-tank and discussion forum. In 2008 he spoke at the first international security conference of the Ukrainian Forum in Kiev, hosted by former Ukrainian President Leonid Kuchma. He is a Member of the Board at the Simone Weil Center and the American Committee for U.S.-Russian Accord.

His articles in Russian have appeared in the monthly Rodina of the Supreme Soviet of Russia, in the social sciences quarterlies of the Russian Academy of Sciences (ONS and Polis), and the journal of the Institute for International Economy and International Relations (MEiMO). He has also made appearances on RT, a state-owned Russian propaganda television network.

== Works ==
- The Tragedy of Ukraine: What Classical Greek Tragedy Can Teach Us About Conflict Resolution (De Gruyter, 2023)
- Crafting Democracy: How Novgorod has Coped with Rapid Social Change (Cornell University Press, 2004)
- Russian Foreign Policy: From Empire to Nation-State co-authored with Alvin Z. Rubinstein (Longman, 1997)
- The Rebirth of Russian Democracy: An Interpretation of Political Culture (Harvard, 1995)
