= Josep Franch (footballer) =

Spanish footballer (1943–2021)

Personal information
- Full name: Josep Franch Xargay
- Date of birth: 1 August 1943
- Place of birth: Santa Cristina d'Aro, Spain
- Date of death: 19 May 2021 (aged 77)
- Place of death: Barcelona, Spain
- Height: 1.73 m (5 ft 8 in)
- Position: Defender

Youth career
- Banyoles
- Figueres
- Girona

Senior career*
Years	Team	Apps	(Gls)
1965–1968	Badalona	59	(0)
1968–1971	Barcelona	17	(1)
1971–1975	Sabadell	110	(2)
Total		186	(3)
- * Club domestic league appearances and goals

Josep Franch Xargay (1 August 1943 – 19 May 2021) was a Spanish professional footballer who played as a defender.

== Career ==
Born in Santa Cristina d'Aro, Franch played for Banyoles, Figueres, Girona, Badalona, Barcelona and Sabadell.

After retiring from football he worked in construction and hospitality, before dying in a hospital in Barcelona on 19 May 2021, aged 77.
