= Jan Gullberg =

Jan Gullberg

Jan Gullberg (1936 – 21 May 1998) was a Swedish surgeon and anaesthesiologist, but became known as a writer on popular science and medical topics. He is best known outside Sweden as the author of Mathematics: From the Birth of Numbers, published by W. W. Norton in 1997 (ISBN 039304002X).

== Life ==
Gullberg grew up and was trained as a surgeon in Sweden. He qualified in medicine at the University of Lund in 1964. He practised as a surgeon in Saudi Arabia, Norway and Virginia Mason Hospital, Seattle in the United States, as well as in Sweden. Gullberg saw himself as a doctor rather than a writer. His first book, on science, won the Swedish Medical Society's Jubilee Prize in 1980, and saw him promoted to honorary doctor at the University of Lund the same year.

He was twice married: first to Anne-Marie Hallin (d. 1983), with whom he had three children; and Ann Richardson (b. 1951) with whom he adopted twin sons, Kamen and Kalin.

He died of a stroke in Nordfjordeid, Norway at the hospital where he was working.

== Mathematics: From the Birth of Numbers ==
Gullberg's second (and last) book, Mathematics: From the Birth of Numbers, took ten years to write, consuming all of his spare time. It proved a major success; its first edition of 17,000 copies was virtually sold out within six months.

=== Contents ===
The book's 1093 pages address the following topics:

1. Numbers and Language
2. Systems of Numeration
3. Types of Numbers
4. Cornerstones of Mathematics
5. Combinatorics
6. Symbolic Logic
7. Set Theory
8. Introduction to Sequences and Series
9. Theory of Equations
10. Introduction to Functions
11. Overture to the Geometries
12. Elementary Geometry
13. Trigonometry
14. Hyperbolic Functions
15. Analytic Geometry
16. Vector Analysis
17. Fractals
18. Matrices and Determinants
19. Embarking on Calculus
20. Introduction to Differential Calculus
21. Introduction to Integral Calculus
22. Power Series
23. Indeterminate Limits
24. Complex Numbers Revisited
25. Extrema and Critical Points
26. Arc Length
27. Centroids
28. Area
29. Volume
30. Motion
31. Harmonic Analysis
32. Methods of Approximation
33. Probability Theory
34. Differential Equations

=== Reception ===
Gullberg's innovative use of the margin for names, dates, and small diagrams enlivens the text, as here with his account of how Eratosthenes estimated the circumference of the Earth using the angle to the Sun at Alexandria and Syene.

Arnold Allen, reviewing Mathematics: From the Birth of Numbers in The American Mathematical Monthly, wrote that although there were many worthy books that could claim the title of people's guide to mathematics, "Gullberg's book is clearly the overall winner. ... It is a wonderful read. I take it with me everywhere I go." Allen says the book has "special charm", making innovative use of the margin and providing "excellent quotes and quips" throughout. His favourite chapter is "Cornerstones of Mathematics" which he believes should appeal both to beginners and "old hands". He professes himself amazed at Gullberg's revelation of an alternative pencil-and-paper method of multiplication from the one we all learned at school, namely the Egyptian method of duplation, and loves the "Russian peasant" multiplication method involving "successive duplation and mediation". He admires the "efficient" Babylonian method of finding square roots, using division and averaging. He learns from Gullberg how to multiply and divide using an abacus.

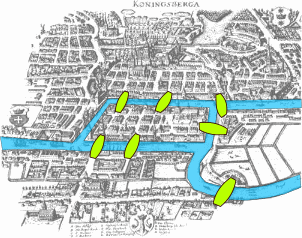
The seven bridges of Königsberg

Allen is delighted by the chapter on combinatorics, with its approach to graph theory and magic squares, complete with 1740 map of the seven bridges of Königsberg (which have to be traversed exactly once). He enjoys Gullberg's account of the Fibonacci, Lucas and Pell sequences; and he finds the two-page account of Fermat's Last Theorem "at exactly the right level for those who are mathematically disadvantaged, but with some sophistication as well." He loved the chapter on probability. He claims that after he showed colleagues the book, he had to keep it hidden to prevent it from disappearing, and suggests that every high school maths teacher should be given a copy to improve maths teaching across America. He records that he finds its introductory accounts useful for engineers who use maths only occasionally, and suggests how the book could be used for undergraduate students. He concludes by describing the book as "gigantic ... in every sense" (it weighs 4 pounds 13 ounces, is 1100 pages long) and was 10 years in the making, and calls it "a giant leap forward for mathematics and all those who love it!".

The book was positively reviewed in Scientific American, but more reservedly in New Scientist. Kevin Kelly comments that the book is an "oracle" able to provide answers on obscure mathematical concepts; in his view "The book has wit and humor; you’ll need persistence."

Gullberg commented, "At the start no 'real mathematician' would accept my book. And perhaps it was a bit crazy of me to write a book on mathematics, as it would be for a mathematician to write a book on surgery."

== Other works ==
- Vätska Gas Energi – Kemi och Fysik med tillämpningar i vätskebalans-, blodgas- och näringslära (1978) Kiruna. ISBN 91-7260-173-6
