= List of Jewish footballers =

The following is a list of Jewish association football players, organized by nationality.

Name	Nationality	Date of birth	Date of death	Position	Years active	International caps	International goals	Ref.
Alan Damián Bender	Argentina	1986	Living	FW	2005–2014			
Wayne Rooney	England	1985	Living	FW	2002 -- 2021	120	53	
Lucas Licht	Argentina	1981	Living	DF	1999–present	0	0	
Federico Mociulsky	Argentina	1989	Living	MF	2007–present	0	0	
Diego Nicolaievsky	Argentina	1993	Living	MF	2014–present	0	0	
José Pékerman	Argentina	1949	Living	MF	1970–1977	0	0	
Jaime José Rotman	Argentina			GK	c. 1932–1944	0	0	
Isaac Scliar	Argentina	1920	1991	FW	c. 1939–1951	0	0	
Juan Pablo Sorín	Argentina	1976	Living	MF	1994–2009	76	12	
León Strembel	Argentina	1918		MF	c. 1939–1956	5	0	
Ezra Sued	Argentina	1923	2011	FW	c. 1943–1954	6	2	
Aarón Wergifker	Argentina	1914	1994	DF	c. 1932–1946	4	0	
Marco Wolff	Argentina	1996	Living	DF	2020–present	0	0	
Ashley Brown	Australia	1994	Living	FW	2010–2014	6	1	
Jordan Brown	Australia	1996	Living	MF	2012–2018	0	0	
Tal Karp	Australia	1981	Living	MF	1996–2009	27	2	
Melissa Maizels	Australia	1993	Living	GK	2012–present	0	0	
Jacob Muir	Australia	2002	Living	DF	2019–present	0	0	
Jordan Swibel	Australia	1999	Living	FW	2016–present	0	0	
Richard Kohn	Austria	1888	1963	MF	1904–1920	7	2	
Nick Blackman	Barbados	1989	Living	FW	2006–2021	6	3	
Daniel Tenenbaum	Brazil	1995	Living	GK	2014–present	0	0	
Tomer Chencinski	Canada	1984	Living	GK	2007–2018	1	0	
Sebastián Rozental	Chile	1976	Living	FW	1992–2008	27	2	
Tvrtko Kale	Croatia	1974	Living	GK	1994–2016	0	0	
Harald Bohr	Denmark	1887	1951	DF	1904–1910	4	2	
Maia Cabrera	Dominican Republic	1999	Living	MF	2021–present	2	0	
David Beckham	England	1975	Living	FW	1992–2013	115	17	
Joe Johnson	England	2006	Living	DF	2023	0	0	
Dave Metchick	England	1943	Living	MF	1961–1975	0	0	
David Pleat	England	1945	Living	MF	1961–1971	0	0	
Alex Scott	England	1984	Living	RB	2002–2018	140 (England), 5 (Great Britain)	12	
Barry Silkman	England	1952	Living	MF	1974–1986	0	0	
Roni Porokara	Finland	1983	Living	MF	2003–2015	24	5	
Boris Rotenberg	Finland	1986	Living	DF	2001–2022	0	0	`
Gary Assous	France	1988	Living	MF	2008–2012	0	0	
Jonathan Assous	France	1983	Living	MF	2001–present	0	0	
Noam Bonnet	France	2002	Living	MF	2020–2024	0	0	
Steven Cohen	France	1986	Living	MF	2003–2015	0	0	
Rudy Haddad	France	1985	Living	MF	2004–2018	0	0	
Mickaël Madar	France	1968	Living	FW	1987–2002	3	1	
Gottfried Fuchs	Germany	1889	1972	FW	1911–1913	6	14	
Julius Hirsch	Germany	1892	1945	MF	1911–1913	7	4	
Ignác Amsel	Hungary	1889	1974	GK	c. 1920–1937	9	0	
Gyula Bíró	Hungary	1890	1961	MF	c. 1905–1916	36	3	
Lajos Czeizler	Hungary	1893	1969	GK	c. 1910–1923			
József Eisenhoffer	Hungary	1900	1945	FW	c. 1917–1941	8	7	
Gyula Feldmann	Hungary	1880	1955	DF	c. 1909–1923	10	0	
Lajos Fischer	Hungary	1902	1978	GK	c. 1920–1931	9	0	
József Fogl	Hungary	1897	1971	DF	c. 1910–1931			
Károly Fogl	Hungary	1895	1969	DF	c. 1910–1930			
Sándor Gellér	Hungary	1925	1996	DF	1945–1956	8	0	
Dezső Grósz	Hungary	1898	1975	DF	c. 1920–1931	2	0	
Béla Guttmann	Hungary	1899	1981	DF	1919–1933	4	1	
Lippo Hertzka	Hungary	1904	1951	FW	c. 1919–1923			
Adolf Kertész	Hungary	1892	1920	DF	c. 1910–1920	11	0	
Gyula Kertész	Hungary	1888	1982	MF	c. 1908–1928	1	0	
Vilmos Kertész	Hungary	1890	1962	MF	c. 1908–1924	47	11	
Sándor Nemes	Hungary	1899	1977	FW	1916–1933	3	0	
Rudolph Nickolsburger	Hungary	1899	1969	MF	c. 1920–1932	2	0	
Ferenc Sas	Hungary	1915	1988	MF	1936–1938	17	2	
Alfréd Schaffer	Hungary	1893	1945	FW	c. 1910–1925	15	17	
Béla Sebestyén	Hungary	1885	1959	MF	c. 1905–1915	24	2	
Oszkár Szendrő	Hungary	1889	1947	DF	c. 1900–1920	13	0	
Imre Taussig	Hungary	1894	1945	MF	c. 1910–1920	5	1	
Antal Vágó	Hungary	1891	1944	MF	c. 1910–1930	17	0	
Árpád Weisz	Hungary	1896	1944		c. 1922–1926	7	0	
Ferenc Weisz	Hungary	1885	1944	FW	c. 1900–1920	17	3	
Louis Bookman	Ireland	1890	1943	FW	1914–1921	4	0	
Giovanni Di Veroli	Italy	1932	2018	DF	1952–1957	0	0	
Dudu Aouate	Israel	1977	Living	GK	1995–2014	45	0	
Reuven Atar	Israel	1969	Living	MF	1986–2003	32	3	
Pini Balili	Israel	1979	Living	FW	1996–2014	29	7	
Tal Banin	Israel	1971	Living	MF	1987–2006	80	12	
Elyaniv Barda	Israel	1981	Living	MF	1998–2018	19	9	
Jerry Beit haLevi	Israel	1912	1997	FW	1927–1945	1	0	
Tal Ben Haim I	Israel	1982	Living	DF	2001–2021	96	1	
Tal Ben Haim II	Israel	1989	Living	FW	2007–present	27	5	
Arik Benado	Israel	1973	Living	DF	1991–2012	95	0	
Yossi Benayoun	Israel	1980	Living	MF	1997–2019	75	19	
Nir Davidovich	Israel	1976	Living	GK	1994–2013	50	0	
Baruch Dego	Israel	1981	Living	MF	1997–2019	2	0	
Eli Driks	Israel	1964	Living	FW	1981–2000	27	4	
Eli Fuchs	Israel	1924	1992	MF	c. 1944–1955	9	0	
Shimon Gershon	Israel	1977	Living	DF	1996–2010	50	4	
Yehoshua Glazer	Israel	1927	2018	FW	1944–1966	35	18	
Alon Harazi	Israel	1971	Living	DF	1989–2009	89	2	
Tomer Hemed	Israel	1987	Living	FW	2005–present	37	17	
Ya'akov Hodorov	Israel	1927	2006	GK	1942–1966	31	0	
Yaniv Katan	Israel	1981	Living	FW	1998–2014	31	5	
Adoram Keisi	Israel	1972	Living	DF	1990–2007	55	4	
Nir Klinger	Israel	1966	Living	DF	1984–1998	83	2	
Tal Ma'abi	Israel	1985	Living	DL	2003-2016	0	0	
Uri Malmilian	Israel	1957	Living	MF	1973–1993	62	16	
Alon Mizrahi	Israel	1971	Living	FW	1988–2005	38	17	
Avi Nimni	Israel	1972	Living	MF	1990–2008	80	17	
Eli Ohana	Israel	1964	Living	MF	1980–1999	50	17	
Avi Ran	Israel	1963	1987	GK	1981–1987	9	0	
Haim Revivo	Israel	1972	Living	MF	1990–2004	67	15	
Moshe Romano	Israel	1946	Living	FW	c. 1965–1982	12	5	
Nahum Stelmach	Israel	1936	1999	FW	1951–1970	53	22	
Benny Tabak	Israel	1957	Living	FW	1972–1994	12	5	
Idan Tal	Israel	1975	Living	MF	1994–2013	69	5	
Yochanan Vollach	Israel	1945	Living	DF	1962–1990	12	1	
Eran Zahavi	Israel	1987	Living	MF	2006–present	67	31	
Michael Zandberg	Israel	1980	Living	MF	1998–present	20	4	
Itzik Zohar	Israel	1970	Living	MF	1987–2005	31	9	
Jonathan Levin	Mexico	1993	Living	MF	2013–present	0	0	
Edgar Davids	Netherlands	1973	Living	MF	1991–2014	74	6	
Daniël de Ridder	Netherlands	1984	Living	FW	2004–2015	0	0	
Bennie Muller	Netherlands	1938	2024	MF	1958–1970	43	2	
Johnny Roeg	Netherlands	1910	2003	FW	1934–1936	0	0	
Sjaak Swart	Netherlands	1938	Living	FW	1956–1973	31	10	
Raul Geller	Peru	1936	Living	MF	c. 1956–1971	0	0	
Ludwik Gintel	Poland	1899	1973	FW	1911–1930	12	0	
Leon Sperling	Poland	1900	1941	MF	1914–1934	16	2	
Zygmunt Steuermann	Poland	1899	1941	FW	1920–1941	2	4	
Finn Azaz	Republic of Ireland	2000	living	MF	2020-present	1	0	
Yakov Erlikh	Russia	1988	Living	FW	2006–present	0	0	
Dean Furman	South Africa	1988	Living	MF	2006–present	5	0	
Rudolf Wetzer	Romania	1901	1993	FW	1920–1937	17	13	
Sam Latter	Scotland	1904	2010	DF	1928–1931	0	0	
Semen Altman	Soviet Union	1946	Living	GK	1965–1965	0	0	
Leonid Buryak	Soviet Union	1953	Living	MF	1963–1971	49	8	
Eduard Dubinski	Soviet Union	1935	1969	DF	1954–1968	12	0	
Mikhail Gershkovich	Soviet Union	1948	Living	FW	1966–1979	10	3	
Adamas Golodets	Soviet Union	1933	2006	FW	1954–1964	0	0	
Viktor Kanevskyi	Soviet Union	1936	2018	FW	1946–1959	2	0	
Viktor Kaplun	Soviet Union	1958	Living	DF	1976–1984	1	0	
Konstantin Krizhevsky	Soviet Union	1926	2000	DF	1946–1961	14	0	
Eduard Mudrik	Soviet Union	1939	2017	DF	1957–1969	8	1	
Boris Razinsky	Soviet Union	1933	2012	GK	1947–1973	3	0	
Valeri Urin	Soviet Union	1934	2023	FW	1953–1966	5	0	
Mikhail Yakushin	Soviet Union	1910	1998	DF	1928–1944	0	0	
Hennadiy Altman	Ukraine	1979	Living	GK	1998–2008	0	0	
Andriy Oberemko	Ukraine	1984	Living	MF	2004–2015	0	0	
Ryan Adeleye	United States	1987	Living	DF	2005–present	0	0	
Jeff Agoos	United States	1968	Living	DF	1991–2005	134	4	
Yari Allnutt	United States	1970	Living	MF	1993–2004	5	2	
Yael Averbuch West	United States	1986	Living	DF	2002–2018	26	1	
Kyle Beckerman	United States	1982	Living	MF	2007–2020	37	1	
Rhett Bernstein	United States	1987	2026	DF	2010–2017	0	0	
Jonathan Bornstein	United States	1984	Living	DF	2007–2020	24	2	
Steve Birnbaum	United States	1991	Living	DF	2008–2017	11	1	
Dan Calichman	United States	1968	Living	DF	1991–2001	3	0	
Benny Feilhaber	United States	1985	Living	MF	2005–2020	28	2	
Eddy Hamel	United States	1902	1943	MF	1922–1930			
Zac MacMath	United States	1991	Living	GK	2011–present	0	0	
Shep Messing	United States	1949	Living	GK	1973–1987	0	0	
Daniel Steres	United States	1990	Living	DF	2011–present	0	0	
Matt Turner	United States	1994	Living	GK	2021–present	33	0	
Sara Whalen	United States	1976	Living	MF	1997–2002			
DeAndre Yedlin	United States	1993	Living	DF	2014–present	81	0	
Joe Jacobson	Wales	1986	Living	DF	2006–present	0	0	

== See also ==
- List of Jews in sports
- History of the Jews in association football
