= Bican =

Bican (feminine: Bicanová) is a Czech surname. It was derived from the name Vican, which was a short name for Vincenc (Czech form of Vincent). Notable people with the surname include:

- František Bican (1891–1921), Czech footballer
- Josef Bican (1913–2001), Czech footballer
