= Jews in association football =

There is a long history of Jews in association football, including as "club owners, players, agents, analysts, fans, and directors". In Europe before World War Two, "Jews played a prominent part in European football as players, coaches, administrators and patrons, not to mention supporters".

== History ==
=== Austria ===
Jewish brothers, Hugo and Willy Meisl both held reputable positions in the world of Austrian soccer. Willy, a renowned sports journalist, fought the "degenerate" Jewish stereotype held especially popular in Central Europe in the years leading up to WWII, and even after his exile to Britain was made necessary by the rise of Nazism. Hugo with experience in both refereeing and football management took over as the Austrian national team head coach through the "Wunderteam" era of the 1930's. During this period the Austrian team won 14 straight games including strong European competition and proved itself a contender on the worldwide stage. These victories further legitimized the Jew in football through its coach and numerous Jewish players.

Some contributors of Jewish players during this era were the clubs Austria Wien and Hakoah Vienna, the latter being entirely Jewish involved aside from some exceptions within the coaching staff. Hakoah Vienna called "the greatest creative achievement of Viennese Jewry" by Willy Meisl had an impressive run beating West Ham United in 1923, and won an Austrian football league title with an all Jewish team in 1925. The club toured extensively abroad, helping to place their Jewish footballers, like Béla Guttmann, on a global stage. Both Hakoah Vienna and Austria Wien held players that would be selected for the Austrian national team, notably contributing to the "Wunderteam". However, the clubs and its players were subject to growing antisemitism in Austria in the 1920s and 1930s, leading to its closure in 1938 after the Anschluss. Hakoah Vienna's activities were terminated, facilities confiscated, and its footballers excluded from organized competition, while Austria Wien was expected to exclude its Jewish players. After the end of WWII, Hakoah Vienna reopened, but the football team only remained open for 4 years, before closing in 1949.

=== Czechoslovakia ===
The majority Jewish population of Theresienstadt Ghetto within Czechoslovakia suffered greatly. The people of Theresienstadt formed its own football leagues known as Liga Terezín as a coping method. The league was seen as a propaganda vehicle by Nazi's and thus supported. Liga Terezín had three separate leagues, one professional and two amateur. The league contained many former pro football players, and integrated familiar rules of football such as relegation and promotion. Due to space issues matches were often played with only 7 players a side, this led to high scoring environment. Positions in the league were commoditized due to the minor benefits offered to players such as extra food rations. Positions in the league however were rotated often due to the regular occurrence of deportation and death.

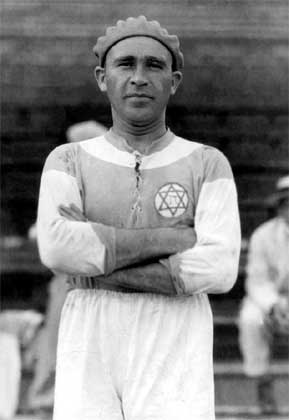
Béla Guttmann as a Hakoah Wien player (1925)

=== England ===
In England, Jewish businessmen helped form the Premier League in 1992.

Tottenham Hotspur has a large proportion of Jewish supporters. Their supporters refer to themselves as "Yids", seen as a derogatory term for Jews. The Metropolitan Police have said they will arrest anyone who uses the term Yid. Their previous three chairmen were Jewish. Leyton Orient (originally Clapton Orient) had Jewish players before the Second World War and continued to field Jewish players regularly up until the 80s, with their time in English top flight in the 60s being funded by two Jewish businessmen.

In September 2010, West Ham United manager, Avram Grant and defender Tal Ben Haim were given permission to be absent from a game against Stoke City so they could celebrate the Jewish festival of Yom Kippur.

In 2011 Rabbi Alex Goldberg was appointed as chairperson for the Football Association's Faith in Football group and attended an anti-discrimination in football summit hosted by the Prime Minister at 10 Downing Street in February 2012. In 2019, he initiated a project that saw the building of a Sukkah in Wembley Stadium, the home of English football. In October 2023, Goldberg resigned from the Faith in Football group following the decision not to light the arch at Wembley Stadium, before upcoming England matches, in blue and white, the colours of the Israeli flag following the October 7 attacks.

In January 2020, Chelsea unveiled a mural by Solomon Souza on an outside wall of the West Stand at their Stamford Bridge stadium. The mural was part of Chelsea's 'Say No to Antisemitism' campaign funded by Jewish club owner Roman Abramovich. Included on the mural were depictions of footballers Julius Hirsch and Árpád Weisz, who were killed at Auschwitz concentration camp, and Ron Jones, a British prisoner of war known as the 'Goalkeeper of Auschwitz'. In 2023, Chief Rabbi, Ephraim Mirvis, led a commemorative service for Hirsch at Stamford Bridge before a Champions League game against Borussia Dortmund. He delivered a prayer of remembrance and lit a yahrzeit candle, marking 80 years since Hirsch was murdered at Auschwitz.

In January 2021, Premier League clubs commemorated Holocaust Memorial Day remembering the six million Jewish men, women and children killed between 1941 and 1945 by the Nazis and their collaborators in The Holocaust.

In November 2021, two West Ham United supporters were arrested and later banned by the club after singing an antisemitic song as a Jewish man in Jewish religious clothing was walking down the aisle of a plane to take his seat on a flight from London Stansted to Belgium where West Ham were playing Genk in the 2021–22 Europa League. The two men were arrested on suspicion of hate crimes, on their return to Stansted. The two, from Essex and from Kent, were later charged with causing racially or religiously aggravated harassment, alarm or distress, an offence under section 4A of the Public Order Act. They were bailed to appeared at Chelmsford Magistrates' Court. The court case later collapsed after the CPS could not determine whether the alleged offences took place in British airspace.

At the end of the 2024–25 Premier League season, football pundit, presenter and former England footballer, Gary Lineker was sacked by the BBC for reposting a pro-Gaza video on social media which likened supporters of Israel to rats.

In October 2025, supporters of Israeli club Maccabi Tel Aviv were banned from attending their away fixture in November 2025 against Aston Villa in the Europa League. This was done on the advice of Birmingham's Safety Advisory Group following concerns for public safety if always supporters attended the match. Prime Minister Keir Starmer called the move wrong and said, "we will not tolerate antisemitism on our streets". He also said that the Secretary of State for Culture, Media and Sport, Lisa Nandy would be meeting officials in an attempt to resolve the ban. Barney Ronay, chief sports writer of The Guardian called the decision to ban Maccabi fans "a terrible decision". However, others defended the decision, stating that Maccabi's fans had a history of violence. While attempts were still being made to resolve the ban, Maccabi Tel Aviv said they would decline any ticket allocation from Aston Villa over safety concerns, after their derby game against Hapoel Tel Aviv had been called off following fan violence. In November, West Midlands Police allocated 700 officers to the match to keep the public safe and to tackle any crime and disorder. Protests were planned by Palestine supporting groups including Palestine Solidarity Campaign, Stop the War Coalition, Muslim Association of Britain, Friends of Al-Aqsa, Kashmir solidarity campaign and Palestinian Forum who wanted the match to be called off. At the game itself, they were protests by both pro-Palestine and pro-Israel groups and there were five people arrested on suspicion of racially aggravated public order offences.

=== Germany ===
German Jew Walther Bensemann founded Germany's many year leading sports magazine Kicker in 1920. After overseeing the magazine through an explosive growth in the years after its founding. Bensemann was forced into retirement in 1933 as anti-semetic sentiment grew viciously within Germany, and died less than two years later.

With the rise of the Nazi regime, Jewish participation in football was squashed and repressed as much as possible, leading to the banning or dissolution of many Jewish clubs. Jewish players were also removed from teams, whether from government choice or team decision.

The Nazi regime destroyed the careers and legacies of many greats of Jewish football. Talented striker Julius Hirsch a national member and great war soldier for Germany, was not spared. Hirsch was known for success on the world stage, including being the first German player to score 4 goals, was exiled from the game alongside other Jews. The distress of his forced separation from football led to a suicide attempt, and stints in a mental hospital. He was deported to a concentration camp in 1943 where he died under unknown circumstances. Fellow striker and only other Jewish member of the German national team in all history, Gottfried Fuchs was able to flee Germany, eventually reaching Canada

=== Israel ===
The Mandatory Palestine national football team was founded as the team representing Mandatory Palestine but only fielded Jewish players and played the Jewish song "Hatikvah" alongside "God Save the King" during their FIFA World Cup qualifiers. In 1948, the governing body changed their name to the Israel Football Association following the establishment of Israel.

=== Scotland ===
In Scotland, Third Lanark was predominantly supported by Jewish supporters due to being in a mostly-Jewish area of Glasgow. When Third Lanark dissolved in the 1960s, some Jewish supporters started to follow Celtic due to contemporary successes. In modern times, many Jewish football fans in the city supported Rangers due to gaining support while at Protestant schools which were more open to Jewish students than Catholic schools. Rangers fans also fly the flag of Israel at matches in response to their Old Firm rivals Celtic using the flag of Palestine. This was despite the Jewish Representative Council of Glasgow asking fans to stop due to the mix of politics and football making some feel uncomfortable.

On 1 September 2023, Israeli footballer, Liel Abada signed a new four-year contract with Celtic having joined the club in July 2021. His career with Celtic was affected by the Gaza war, as the Celtic's Green Brigade fans group demonstrated their support for Palestine by displaying the Palestinian flag. Abada met with Celtic senior management after these displays, which had led to him being criticised in Israel. Celtic issued a statement saying that it was "inappropriate" for the fans to show those messages. Abada, injured when the war started, returned to the team in December. Celtic manager Brendan Rodgers said in February 2024 that it was "challenging" for Abada to produce his best form in the circumstances, and then confirmed that he could leave the club. On 8 March 2024 Abada left Celtic joining Major League Soccer team Charlotte for a reported fee of £8 million.

=== Netherlands ===
AFC Ajax of Amsterdam, like Tottenham Hotspur, has a long history of Jewish support and involvement despite not being an officially Jewish club. The club's former De Meer Stadion was located in the largely Jewish east side of the city. Three club presidents since World War II have been Jewish. Since 1976, some Ajax fans, largely non-Jewish, have dubbed themselves "Super Jews" in response to antisemitic chanting by rivals such as Feyenoord.

On 7 November 2024, supporters of Maccabi Tel Aviv who were in Amsterdam to watch their team play Ajax in the Europa League, gathered before the match. They began shouting anti-Arab chants, waved Israeli flags and took down a Palestinian flag. Subsequently, pro-Palestinian groups took to the streets to combat them, shouting pro-Palestine, and anti-IDF slogans. 62 arrests were made and five people were treated in hospital while others suffered minor injuries. The attackers were condemned by both the King of the Netherlands, Willem-Alexander and the Mayor of Amsterdam, Femke Halsema. In the following days, a further five men, all from the Netherlands, aged between 18 and 37, were arrested on suspicion of "public violence against persons" both before and after the Europa League game. Further condemnation of the violence came form Netherlands Prime Minister, Dick Schoof. No arrests of Israeli supporters were made despite videos of some chanting fanatic anti-Arab slogans.

=== United States of America ===
Don Garber, a second-generation Orthodox Jew and the 2nd Commissioner of Major League Soccer (MLS) played a pivotal role in the development of the MLS.

== Jewish footballers ==
Modern Jewish footballers have said they want to inspire others. Jewish footballers playing in foreign countries have been allowed to avoid playing on the High Holy Day of Yom Kippur, or remain a substitute until the observance has finished.
