= Josef Bican =

Austrian-Czech footballer (1913–2001)

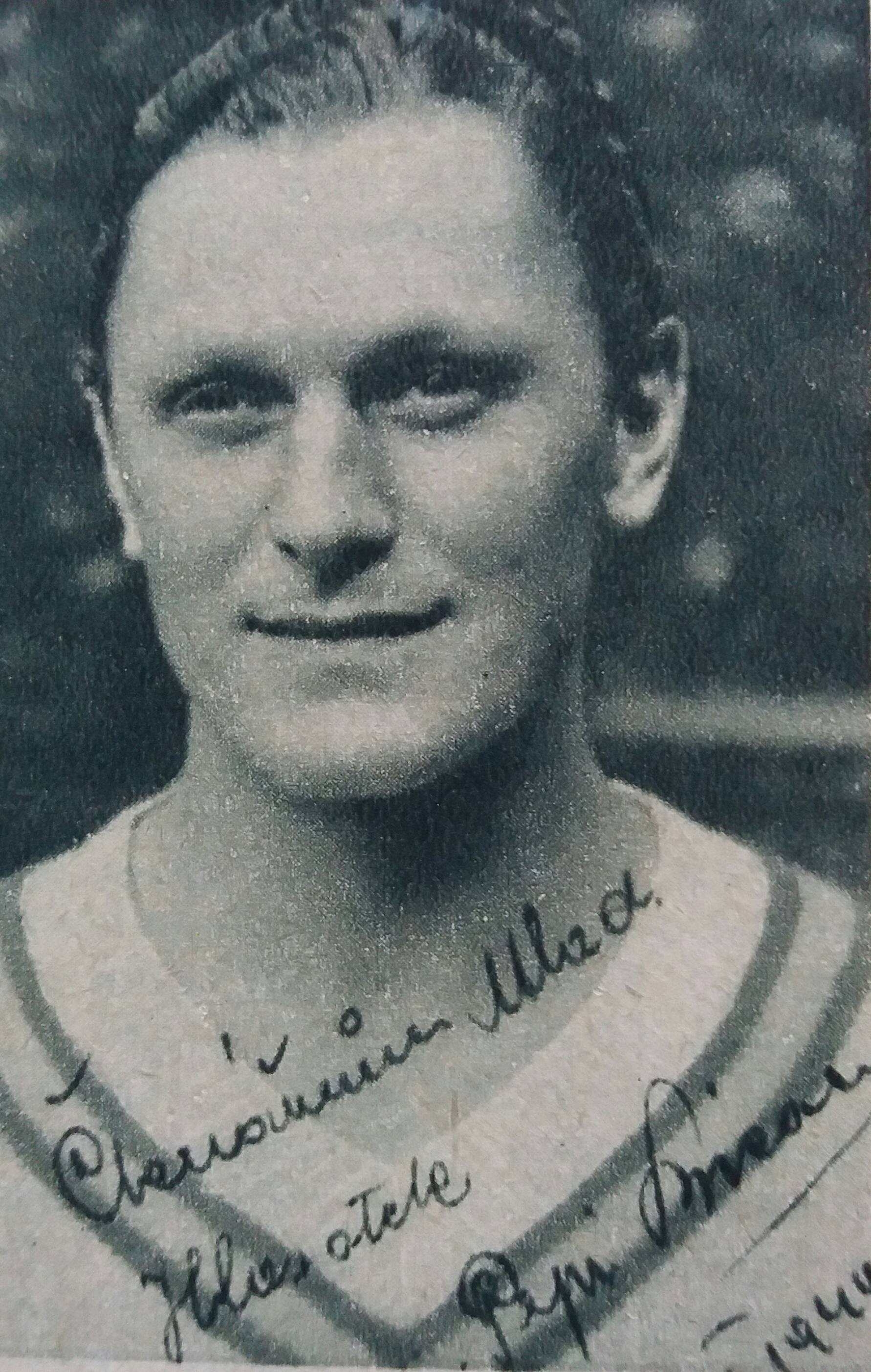
- Bican in 1940

Personal information
- Full name: Josef Bican
- Date of birth: 25 September 1913
- Place of birth: Vienna, Austria-Hungary
- Date of death: 12 December 2001 (aged 88)
- Place of death: Prague, Czech Republic
- Height: 1.78 m (5 ft 10 in)
- Position: Striker

Youth career
- 1925–1928: Hertha Vienna
- 1928–1930: Schustek
- 1930–1931: Farbenlutz

Senior career*
Years	Team	Apps	(Gls)
1931	Farbenlutz	2	(2)
1931	Rapid Amateur	0	(0)
1931–1935	Rapid Vienna	49	(54)
1935–1937	Admira Vienna	26	(18)
1937–1948	Slavia Prague	219	(416)
1948–1951	Vítkovice	58	(74)
1951–1952	Hradec Králové (Note: The club was known as Sokol Škoda by 1952.)	26	(53)
1952–1955	Dynamo Prague	32	(22)
1957	Slovan Liberec	1	(0)
1957	Spartak Brno ZJŠ	4	(2)
Total		417	(641)

International career
1933–1936	Austria	19	(14)
1938–1949	Czechoslovakia	14	(12)
1939	Bohemia and Moravia	2	(6)

Managerial career
- 1954–1956: Dynamo Prague
- 1956–1959: Slovan Liberec
- 1957–1958: Spartak Brno ZJŠ
- 1959–1960: TJ Spartak ZJS Brno
- 1963–1964: TJ Baník Příbram
- 1964: FC Hradec Králové
- 1967–1969: SONP Kladno
- 1969–1972: KSK Tongeren
- 1977: Benešov
- * Club domestic league appearances and goals

Josef "Pepi" Bican (25 September 1913 – 12 December 2001) was an Austrian and Czech professional footballer who played as a striker. He is regarded as one of the greatest goalscorers in the history of the sport. He is considered by RSSSF as the third-most prolific goalscorer in history after Erwin Helmchen and Cristiano Ronaldo, with over 950 goals scored in 624 official matches. He scored 591 goals in 301 official games for Slavia Prague across his 11-year playing career at the club.

Bican began his professional career at Rapid Vienna in 1931. After four years at Rapid, he moved to local rivals Admira Vienna. Bican won four league titles during his time in Austria, moved to Slavia Prague in 1937, where he stayed until 1948, and became the club's all-time top goalscorer. He later played for Vítkovice, Hradec Králové, and Dynamo Prague, retiring in 1955 as the all-time top goalscorer in the Czechoslovak First League with 447 goals. According to UEFA, the governing body for European football, he is the leading all-time goalscorer in European top-flight leagues with 518 goals (447 in Czechoslovakia and 71 in Austria), narrowly ahead of Hungarian Ferenc Puskás.

Bican was a member of the Austrian Wunderteam of the 1930s and represented the nation at the 1934 FIFA World Cup, where they reached the semi-finals. He later switched allegiance to the Czechoslovakia national football team, but a clerical error related to his transfer of national team precluded him from playing in the 1938 FIFA World Cup. Bican was a tall and powerful player, with the technical ability to play with both feet, and had considerable pace. During his athletic prime, he was reportedly capable of running 100 metres in 10.8 seconds, which was not far off the leading sprinters of his time.

After his retirement from playing, Bican became a manager, and coached various teams from the 1950s until the 1970s. In 1998, Bican was given a "Medal of Honour" by the International Federation of Football History & Statistics (IFFHS) for being among the world's most successful top division goalscorers of all time. In 2000, the IFFHS awarded Bican the "Golden Ball" in recognition of his status as the greatest goalscorer of the 20th century. The award was based on how many times a player had been top scorer in his top division domestic league, a feat which Bican achieved 12 times.

== Early life ==
Josef Bican was born in Favoriten, Vienna, Austria-Hungary, to parents František Bican and Ludmila Kopecka, at Quellenstrasse 101. He was the second of three children, František, Josef and Vilík. His father was from Sedlice in Southern Bohemia, and his mother was a Viennese Czech. Josef's father František was a footballer who played for Hertha Vienna. He fought in World War I and returned uninjured; however, František died at the early age of 30 in 1921 after refusing an operation to treat an infected kidney due to injury sustained during a football match. This was when František was just 10, Josef was 8 and Vilík was 3. Hertha Vienna officials gave František a nice funeral and told Ludmila that they would take care of her sons and would even give them an education. At first they visited the boys every day and would bring something to help out. This soon changed as they would come every week, once a fortnight and within three months it was as if they had forgotten about the Bican family. Ludmila was stuck in a desperate situation, she sent Vilík to be looked after by his grandparents in Bohemia, until he was 14. Ludmila's life got harder as she had to work twice as hard as before, cleaning crayfish and washing dishes at a nearby restaurant. Most days she would have to get up at four in the morning to come home at ten, but sometimes even later.

The family's poverty meant that Bican initially had to play football without shoes, which helped him improve his ball control skills. Bican attended the Jan Amos Komenský school, a Czech school in Vienna. For entertainment František and Josef would make a football out of old material and sometimes Ludmila would be left without one stocking. On some days they would arrive at school with dirty clothes and foreheads due to playing football before school. They would play matches between classes and between schools, they had no time to study. Josef would play football so much that she had to lock him indoors to try and get him to study. The players at his school would whistle and call to Josef to get him to come to a match that day. He lived one story up, but this didn't stop him. He climbed out the window and played the game. The school team was victorious as the score was 12–2, Josef had scored 8 goals.

His older brother, František, was also a good footballer, as he started playing for Hertha Vienna, aged 11. However, František died tragically at 17. They had brought him home with a knife in his heart. They had told the Bican family that it was a very unfortunate accident that he had taken his own life. In situations like these, Ludmila was normally brave; however, this time she was scared and she sent Josef to live with Vilík and his grandparents. Working at Schustek parquet factory, Josef would work around the office and in the warehouse and earnt twenty shillings a week. In the spring of 1931 Farbenlutz attracted Bican to start working for them as he would earn 30 shillings a week.

== Early career ==
In 1925, at the age of twelve, Bican was already playing in the youth set-up of Hertha Vienna, his father's beloved club, and also where his idol, Matthias Sindelar had begun his career. At Hertha, he was coached by a former player that had played with his father. The Hertha Vienna pitch was only a few steps away from his house. Bican was the smallest of the boys there, however, his ability to score goals caught the attention of everyone around. One of the club's officials was so impressed that he told him, "You’ll get a shilling every time you score." He scored two in his very first match. Thus, football became a vital income to the poor Bican family.

As his career slowed down at Hertha Vienna, due to him not playing for almost half a year, one of his friends invited him to play for Schustek. It was a parquet factory, small but profitable. At the age of 15, in the autumn of 1928, Bican made his debut for Schustek. Josef scored three goals in a 5–2 friendly victory over Nord Vienna. It is said that once his mother, who had come to watch him, was so annoyed about a foul her son received that she ran onto the pitch and beat the opponent with her umbrella. In 1931 he would start playing for Farbenlutz and would not even train.

Near to where Bican lived, Roman Schramseis resided; after seeing Bican play on several occasions, Roman offered him the chance to train at Rapid Wien, telling him he had "already told Richard Kuthan about it". In his first youth game for the club, he scored seven goals, and so he was promoted to the Amateur side, which was typically for 18- and 19-year-olds. Bican was invited to watch a training session with the amateur team, but as soon as he and his friend watched the others play they got scared and headed home. The next Tuesday, Bican was to play a training game between the junior team and the amateur team. He played for the junior team and scored five goals as they won 7–2. On the Sunday of the same week, he was again invited to play for the adult team. Rapid Wien beat their opponents 4–2 with two goals from Bican. After three months, in June 1931, he was promoted to the Reserves.

== Club career ==
=== Rapid Vienna ===
In 1931, when Bican first joined Rapid Vienna, he received 150 schillings, but, by the age of 20, Rapid wanted to keep him so much that they paid him 600 schillings. In 1931, for Rapid Vienna's Reserve team, Josef scored 30 goals in 16 games. In his debut game against Austria Wien, club where Matthias Sindelar played, Bican scored four goals in a victory 5–3.

Bican recalls the game as this: "Sometime in the tenth minute, I received the ball from the right, in a large amount of space, went around Gall and with my left foot, I scored the first goal, into the corner. Weselik broke through and struck a shot that hit the cross bar, on the rebound I hooked the ball into the net, again, with my left foot. Before halftime, I scored my third goal, a nice, clean instep at full speed. My teammates rushed towards me and carried me to the center of the field. For my fourth, I luckily got past Mock and only Gall was in front of me, he took me to the ground, but I was still able to shoot and score the decisive fifth goal. When the match was over, everyone was kissing me. But in the dressing room they had to cut open my sleeve, to get my shirt off me. I had finished the game with a swollen wrist. I didn't even notice it. The joy was greater than the pain". In 1932 Josef scored 51 goals in 42 games for Rapid Vienna. 23 goals in 9 reserve team games and 28 goals in 33 first team games In 1933 Josef signed a contract to play a game for Wiener, in which they beat Phonix Schwechat 6–2, with Josef scoring 4.

Bican won the Austrian title with Rapid in 1934–35 and his first goalscoring accolade; by the end of the season, he had been suspended after refusing to sign a new contract and Bican decided to go on strike. In total for Rapid Vienna, Josef played 156 games and scored 201 goals. Through one of his uncles, a deal was done with Admira Vienna, at the time the most successful side in Austrian history. Rapid however, refused to release his registration, and Bican went nine months without playing a game. When he was allowed to leave, Bican won championships in both his seasons with the Vienna club, but his heart was set on his family's homeland.

=== Slavia Prague ===
During early January 1937, Bican left Admira Vienna to join Czech club Slavia Prague, he signed a contract for them, despite being on a friendly tour of Egypt. His contract had already ended for Admira Vienna, in 1936, however he was still allowed to play for them. The Austrian Union needed Bican for an inter-state match, they demanded Bican to sign a contract at the beginning of December, if he did not do so, his old contract would be extended for a year; however, Bican did not back down and was adamant to leave.

In his first season at the club, Bican was both the league's top scorer with 22 goals and the 1938 Mitropa Cup with 10 goals, and although Slavia finished as runners-up in the league, they won the cup after a 4–2 aggregate win over Ferencváros, with Bican netting once in the first leg. The following season, in March 1939, Germany invaded Czechoslovakia and football split on similar lines, with Bohemian and Moravian clubs carrying their results from the Czechoslovak league into the new Bohemian-Moravian league. Bican was again the top scorer of the league, this time with 29 goals, but Sparta Prague, Slavia's greatest rival, won the championship again.

The third year (1941), Bican's won his first of four Championships along with the third of 10 consecutive goal scoring accolades. He played for Slavia throughout World War II, while many of his football rivals were at war. In August 1941, Bican played in a friendly match against SK Mnichova Hradiste. In the first half, Slavia were 10–1 up with Bican scoring all 10 of the goals. Bican didn't play in the second half and the overall play was poor from Slavia, as the score ended 13–3. During eight league seasons he scored 328 goals, including 57 in 26 matches one particular season (1943–44).

During the 1939–40 season, Bican set a world record for the longest goal-scoring streak in a European top division when he scored at least one goal for 19 games in a row, netting a total of 47 goals over his run that included hat-tricks in 5 back-to-back league games. His record stood for 73 years until it was broken in 2013 by Lionel Messi (21 games in La Liga, the Spanish league). Three times in his career, Bican scored seven goals in a game. In a 1939–40 league match against Zlín, Bican found the net seven times as Slavia ran out 10–1 winners. During the 1940–41 season, Bican matched his feat of the previous season, again against Zlín, scoring seven times, as Slavia won by a 12–1 scoreline. It was 1947–48 before Bican managed his third seven-goal match, as Slavia defeated České Budějovice in a game which finished 15–1. He was in the leagues that he played, the top-scorer 12 times during his 25-year professional career and Europe's and the world's top scorer in five consecutive seasons, from 1939 to 1940 to 1943–44, a record that still stands.

=== Last years ===
Several clubs were interested in signing Bican after the war ended. Bican joined steel works Železárny Vítkovice. During 1952, he joined Hradec Králové, where he managed to score 53 goals in 26 matches. On 1 May 1953, the Communist Party forced him to leave the city and, therefore, the club. After being forced to leave, he returned to Slavia Prague, or, as it was known then, Dynamo Prague. He continued to play for Dynamo until retiring from playing at the age of 42 in 1955. He was the oldest player in the league at that time.

== International career ==
On 29 November 1933, aged 20 years and 64 days, Bican made his debut for Austria in a 2–2 draw against Scotland. He later played for them at the 1934 World Cup, when the Austrian Wunderteam reached the semi-finals. His solitary goal in the tournament came in extra time of Austria's 3–2 win over France. At the time he was playing for Slavia Prague, Bican applied for Czechoslovak citizenship; however, when he eventually became a Czechoslovak citizen, he discovered that a clerical error meant he couldn't play at the 1938 World Cup. He scored two hat-tricks for Czechoslovakia, including a four-goal haul against Romania in the 1937–38 Eduard Benes Cup in a 6–2 win. He also played for Bohemia & Moravia in two matches, both against Germany and scoring a hat-trick in each of them. In total, he scored 32 goals in 35 international matches for three national teams (Austria, Czechoslovakia and Bohemia & Moravia). His final national team appearance was for Czechoslovakia in a 3–1 defeat against Bulgaria on 4 September 1949, a few days short from his 36th birthday.

Bican's success had a disadvantage, namely that other members of the team became jealous of him, and he was sometimes called abusive names, such as "Austrian bastard". In addition to representing Austria, Czechoslovakia and the region of Bohemia & Moravia, Bican also played a number of fixtures playing for teams consisting of the best players from a league or town between 1939 and 1949. For the Bohemia-Moravia league team in 1939 he played six games scoring nine goals, for the Bohemia league team in 1940–1944 he played eight games scoring 11 goals, for Prague from 1938 to 1948 he played 12 games scoring 11 goals and Ostrava in 1950–51 he played ten games scoring 10 goals, bringing Bican's total number of official goals outside of club football to 67 goals in 69 games.

== Style of play ==
After a game for Rapid Vienna against Austria Vienna, an author in the Austrian newspaper Montagblatt, wrote: "Bican is not the conductor with a great concept. His game is excessive, his assists are difficult to achieve due to their unsaved accuracy." After an Admira Vienna game against Red Star Vienna, in 1936, an author in the Austrian newspaper Montagblatt, wrote: "The most mentioned player on the field was undeniably Bican, not only because of his transfer issues, but also for his truly remarkable performances. His dribbling, fine ball control, and deceiving his opponents were a real feast for the eyes of the spectators. After all, this time Bican was also his team's most successful player, scoring three goals."

Recalling Bican, his former Slavia team-mate Ján Andrejkovič said: "Pepi was a player with all the qualities of a star. Excellent technique with left or right foot, outstanding headers, perfect positional play, precise passing and, above all, an incredible goalscorer." In 1940, a journalist for Slavia Prague wrote, "Bican is undeniably one of our best footballers. We can boldly say that he is one of the best centre forwards in Europe. What he lacks, in perhaps hardness, he makes up for in his unique ball technique. During his time in Prague, Bican has proven to be world class many times."

== Personal life ==
Grandfather František and Grandmother Terezie were one of the poorest families of the town. Grandfather František's second son Josef, died during the war and for financial support they took 50 koruna per month. The start of young Josef's love for fishing came when Grandfather František took him and Vilík to a nearby river and the boys would fish either side of František. His refusal is described in the book, where he reveals he was "born in Vienna, but my father was Czech, just like my mother", before adding: "I always felt like a Czech, and if I did something else, my dad would turn in his grave!" Although the author was based on contemporary sources, he considers these words to be credible. Zikmund wrote: "When I spoke to him, he always emphasized his Czechness."

== Life after retirement ==
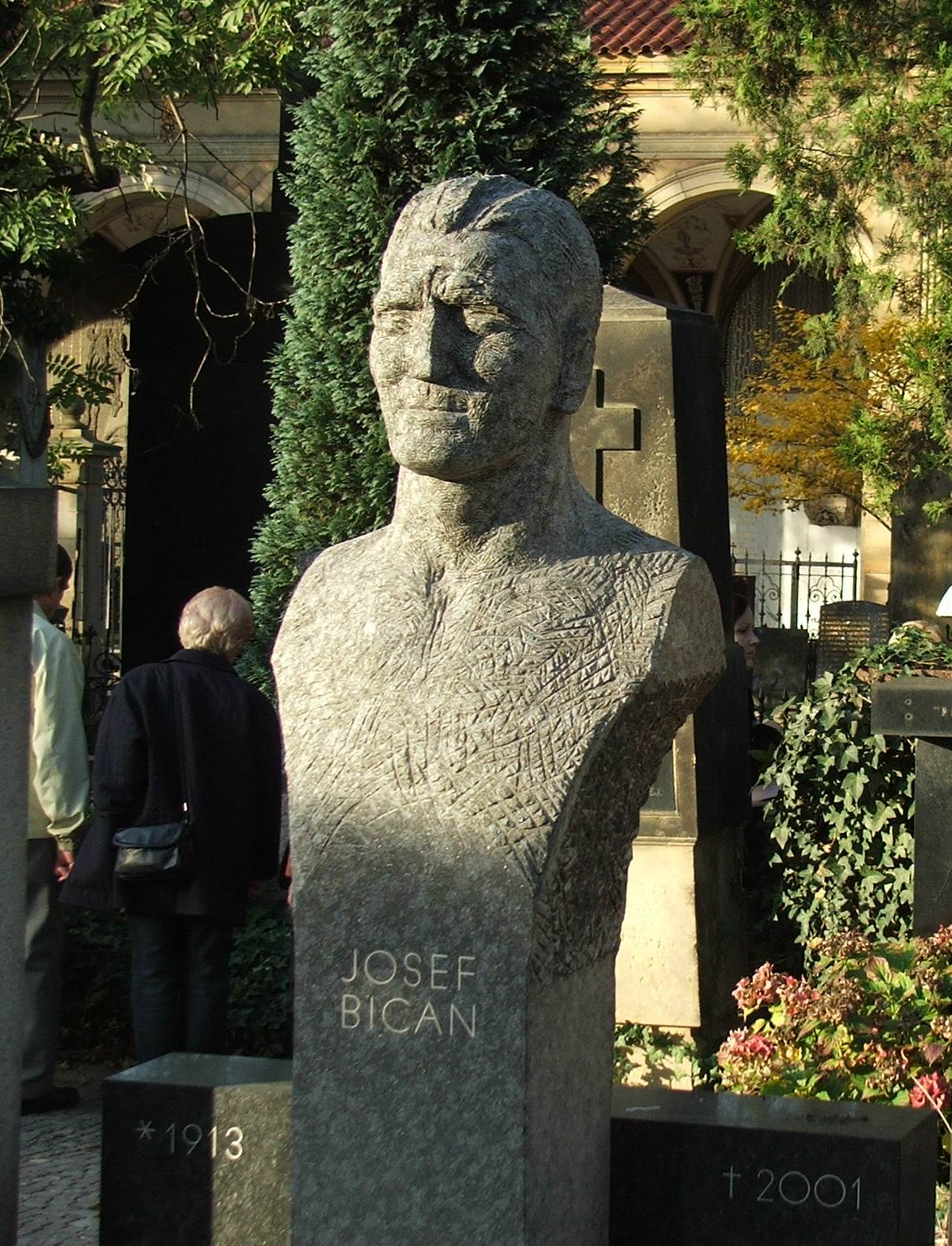
Tombstone of Bican at Prague's Vyšehrad cemetery

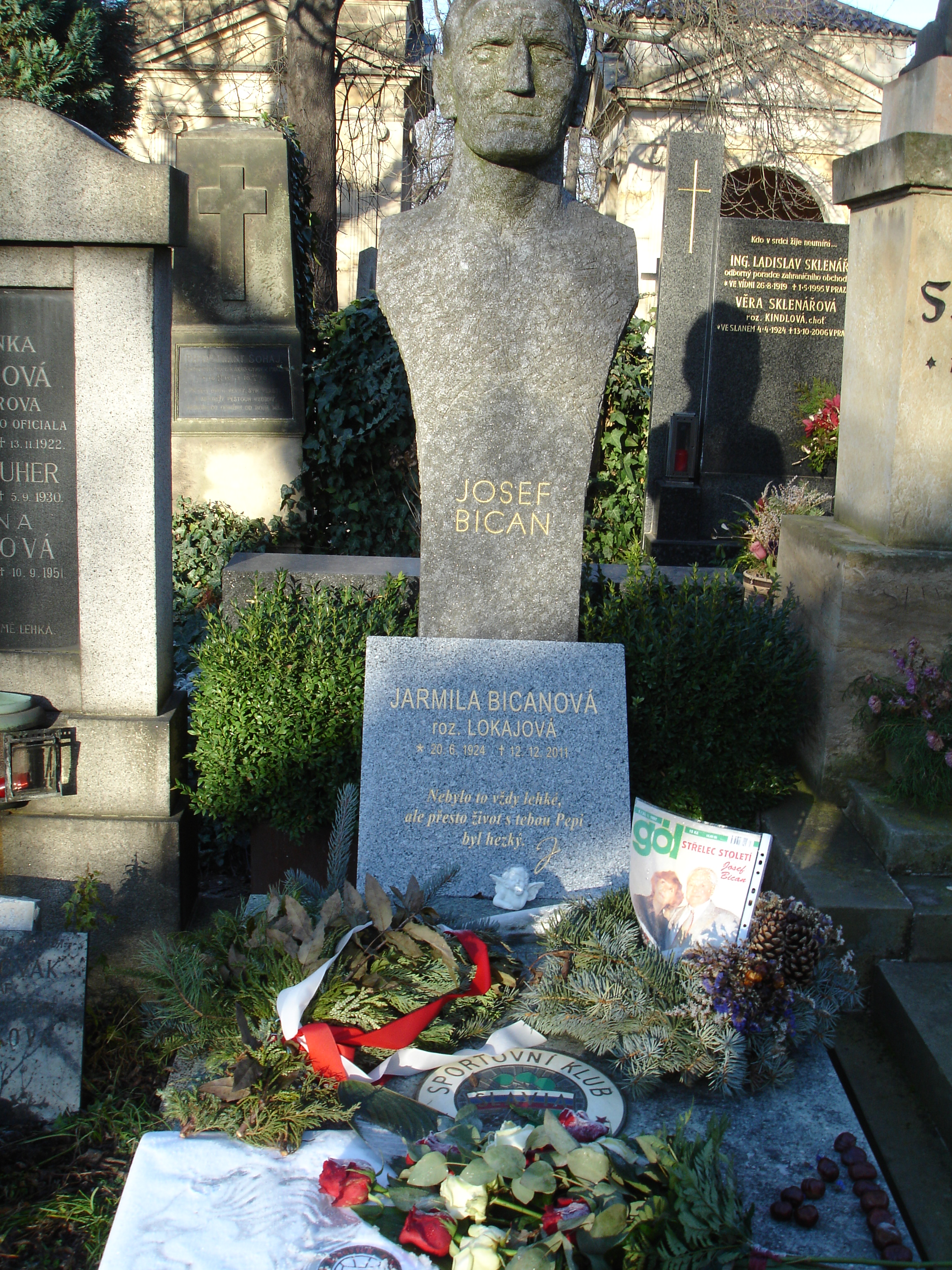
Bican's grave, plus a headstone for his wife Jarmila, who died exactly ten years after him.

Tongeren hired him as a coach in 1968, where he had some success taking them from Division 4 to Division 2. Around this time, Pelé was getting ready for his 1000th goal and many journalists were searching for another player who had scored a thousand goals. Former Austrian player Franz "Bimbo" Binder suggested Bican, who he claimed to have scored over 5,000 goals in all competitions. When reporters asked Bican why he had not sought more attention for his goalscoring feats, he simply said, "who'd have believed me if I said I'd scored five times as many goals as Pelé?" Statistics of his career were not kept properly; only counting goals in official matches, Bican scored at least 950 goals and 1813 including friendlies.

Bican's goal-scoring feats are often forgotten because he did not make a big fuss about it in the media. His record is often overshadowed by Pelé's 1,200 plus goal record, including goals in unofficial matches. Shortly before his death in 2001, the IFFHS (based on RSSSF statistics) declared Bican with 643 league goals, the most prolific scorer of the 20th century. This was judged by the number of times a player had been top scorer in his top-tier domestic league. Bican managed this feat 12 times, more than any other player in football history, a record that still stands.

In the 1990s, Bican spoke to Czech TV about the difficulty of scoring during his era: "When I talk to young reporters, they always say, 'Mr Bican, scoring was easier back in your day.' But I ask them, 'How come? Look, are there opportunities today?' And they tell me, 'Of course there are, many of them'. And I say, 'There you go. If there weren't opportunities, it would be difficult. But if there are, scoring is the same as it was a hundred years ago, and will be the same in a hundred years' time, too. It will always be the same." Bican further stated: "Everybody would agree that a chance should be a goal. If I got five chances, I scored five goals – if I got seven then it was seven." Sports historian Radovan Jelinek said about him: "Bican was incredibly unlucky at the height of his career. There was no World Cup in 1942 or 1946 because of the war. If the 1942 edition had taken place, for example, he would surely have become more widely known. Perhaps he might even have been as famous as Pele."

== Death ==
After suffering from heart problems for several months, Bican died in Prague on 12 December 2001 at the age of 88, and was buried in Vyšehrad Cemetery. On 25 September 2013, which would have been Bican's 100th birthday, Slavia Prague commemorated him by wearing shirts that featured a replica of his signature on them.

== Career statistics ==
=== Club ===
Appearances and goals by club, season and competition
Club	Season	League			Cup		Other		Total	
Club	Season	Division	Apps	Goals	Apps	Goals	Apps	Goals	Apps	Goals
Farbenlutz	1931	VAFÖ	2	2	—		—		2	2
Rapid Wien Amateur	1931–32		—		2	3	—		2	3
Rapid Wien	1931–32	1	8	10	3	3	—		11	13
Rapid Wien	1932–33	1	16	11	2	6	—		18	17
Rapid Wien	1933–34	1	22	29	5	5	3	1	30	35
Rapid Wien	1934–35	1	3	4	—		—		3	4
Rapid Wien	Total		49	54	12	17	3	1	64	72
Admira Wien	1935–36	1	15	8	3	2	2	2	20	12
Admira Wien	1936–37	1	11	10	—		—		11	10
Admira Wien	Total		26	18	3	2	2	2	31	22
Slavia Prague	1936–37	1	—		1	4	—		1	4
Slavia Prague	1937–38	1	19	26	0	0	1	4	20	30
Slavia Prague	1938–39	1	20	29	2	2	8	10	30	41
Slavia Prague	1939–40	1	22	50	3	5	1	1	26	56
Slavia Prague	1940–41	1	22	38	5	11	4	7	31	56
Slavia Prague	1941–42	1	22	45	5	10	3	8	30	63
Slavia Prague	1942–43	1	20	39	1	0	3	7	24	46
Slavia Prague	1943–44	1	26	57	1	3	5	16	32	76
Slavia Prague	1944–45	1	9	16	6	20	—		15	36
Slavia Prague	1945–46	1	16	31	—		1	1	17	32
Slavia Prague	1946–47	1	23	44	—		1	1	24	45
Slavia Prague	1947–48	1	13	20	—		—		13	20
Slavia Prague	1948–49	1	7	21	—		—		7	21
Slavia Prague	Total		219	416	24	55	27	55	270	526
Sokol Vítkovice Železárny	1949	2	17	44	—		—		17	44
Sokol Vítkovice Železárny	1950	1	23	22	—		—		23	22
Sokol Vítkovice Železárny	1951	1	18	8	—		—		18	8
Sokol Vítkovice Železárny	Total		58	74	0	0	0	0	58	74
Hradec Králové	1952	2	26	53	4	7	—		30	60
Dynamo Praha	1953	1	10	7	—		—		10	7
Dynamo Praha	1954	1	14	11	—		—		14	11
Dynamo Praha	1955	1	8	4	—		—		8	4
Dynamo Praha	Total		32	22	0	0	0	0	32	22
Slovan Liberec	1957	3	1	0	—		—		1	0
Zbrojovka Brno	1957	4	4	2	—		—		4	2
Career total			417	641	43	81	32	58	492	780

=== International ===
Appearances and goals by national team and year
National team	Year	Apps	Goals
Austria	1933	2	1
Austria	1934	6	5
Austria	1935	5	3
Austria	1936	6	5
Austria	Total	19	14
Czechoslovakia	1938	6	8
Czechoslovakia	1947	4	4
Czechoslovakia	1948	2	0
Czechoslovakia	1949	2	0
Czechoslovakia	Total	14	12
Bohemia and Moravia	1939	1	3
Bohemia and Moravia	Total	1	3
Career total		34	29

Scores and results list Austria's, Czechoslovakia's and Bohemia and Moravia's goal tally first, score column indicates score after each Bican goal.

List of international goals scored by Josef Bican
No.	Date	Venue	Opponent	Score	Result	Competition
Austria goals
1	10 December 1933	Olympic Stadium, Amsterdam, Netherlands	Netherlands	1–0	1–0	Friendly
2	11 February 1934	Charmilles Stadium, Geneva, Switzerland	Switzerland	1–0	3–2	1933–35 Dr. Gero Cup
3	11 February 1934	Charmilles Stadium, Geneva, Switzerland	Switzerland	3–2	3–2	1933–35 Dr. Gero Cup
4	15 April 1934	Hohe Warte Stadium, Vienna, Austria	Hungary	4–2	5–2	Friendly
5	15 April 1934	Hohe Warte Stadium, Vienna, Austria	Hungary	5–2	5–2	Friendly
6	27 May 1934	Stadio Benito Mussolini, Turin, Italy	France	3–1	3–2	1934 FIFA World Cup
7	6 October 1935	Praterstadion, Vienna, Austria	Hungary	1–1	4–4	1933–35 Dr. Gero Cup
8	6 October 1935	Praterstadion, Vienna, Austria	Hungary	2–2	4–4	1933–35 Dr. Gero Cup
9	6 October 1935	Praterstadion, Vienna, Austria	Hungary	3–4	4–4	1933–35 Dr. Gero Cup
10	19 January 1936	Estadio Metropolitano de Madrid, Madrid, Spain	Spain	3–3	5–4	Friendly
11	26 January 1936	Campo da Constituição, Porto, Portugal	Portugal	3–1	3–2	Friendly
12	22 March 1936	Praterstadion, Vienna, Austria	Czechoslovakia	1–1	1–1	1936–37 Dr. Gero Cup
13	5 April 1936	Praterstadion, Vienna, Austria	Hungary	1–1	3–5	Friendly
14	5 April 1936	Praterstadion, Vienna, Austria	Hungary	2–3	3–5	Friendly
Czechoslovakia goals
1	7 August 1938	Råsunda Stadium, Stockholm, Sweden	Sweden	2–0	6–2	Friendly
2	7 August 1938	Råsunda Stadium, Stockholm, Sweden	Sweden	3–0	6–2	Friendly
3	7 August 1938	Råsunda Stadium, Stockholm, Sweden	Sweden	5–2	6–2	Friendly
4	28 August 1938	Stadion Concordije, Zagreb, Kingdom of Yugoslavia	Yugoslavia	2–0	3–1	1937–38 Eduard Benes Cup
5	4 December 1938	AC Sparta Stadion, Prague, Czechoslovakia	Romania	1–2	6–2	1937–38 Eduard Benes Cup
6	4 December 1938	AC Sparta Stadion, Prague, Czechoslovakia	Romania	3–2	6–2	1937–38 Eduard Benes Cup
7	4 December 1938	AC Sparta Stadion, Prague, Czechoslovakia	Romania	4–2	6–2	1937–38 Eduard Benes Cup
8	4 December 1938	AC Sparta Stadion, Prague, Czechoslovakia	Romania	6–2	6–2	1937–38 Eduard Benes Cup
9	11 May 1947	AC Sparta Stadion, Prague, Czechoslovakia	Yugoslavia	1–0	3–1	Friendly
10	11 May 1947	AC Sparta Stadion, Prague, Czechoslovakia	Yugoslavia	3–1	3–1	Friendly
11	31 August 1947	AC Sparta Stadion, Prague, Czechoslovakia	Poland	1–0	6–3	Friendly
12	31 August 1947	AC Sparta Stadion, Prague, Czechoslovakia	Poland	2–0	6–3	Friendly
Bohemia and Moravia goals
1	12 November 1939	Hermann Göring Stadium, Wrocław, Nazi Germany	Germany	1–0	4–4	Friendly
2	12 November 1939	Hermann Göring Stadium, Wrocław, Nazi Germany	Germany	3–0	4–4	Friendly
3	12 November 1939	Hermann Göring Stadium, Wrocław, Nazi Germany	Germany	4–2	4–4	Friendly

== Honours ==
Rapid Wien

- Austrian Championship: 1934–35

Admira Wien

- Austrian Championship: 1935–36, 1936–37

Slavia Prague

- Czechoslovak First League: 1939–40, 1940–41, 1941–42, 1942–43, 1946–47, 1948
- Czechoslovak Cup: 1940–41, 1941–42
- Central Bohemian Cup: 1940–41, 1943, 1944
- Liberty Cup: 1945
- Mitropa Cup: 1938

Sokol Vítkovice Železárny

- Czechoslovak Second League: 1949 (Group C)

Hradec Králové

- Czechoslovak Second League: 1952

Czechoslovakia

- Eduard Benes Cup: 1938

Individual

- Austrian championship top scorer: 1933–34
- Czechoslovak First League top scorer: 1937–38, 1938–39, 1939–40, 1940–41, 1941–42, 1942–43, 1943–44, 1945–46, 1946–47, 1948, 1950
- Czechoslovak Second League top scorer: 1949, 1952
- Top scorer in European leagues: 1939–40, 1940–41, 1941–42, 1942–43, 1943–44
- IFFHS World's Best Goalscorer of the 20th Century: 1997 (jointly with Pelé and Uwe Seeler).
- IFFHS Medal of Honour: 1998.
- Czech Football Association Hall of Fame: 2013 (posthumously).

== See also ==
- List of men's footballers with 500 or more goals
- List of world association football records
