= Kozlov (Jihlava District) =

- Municipality
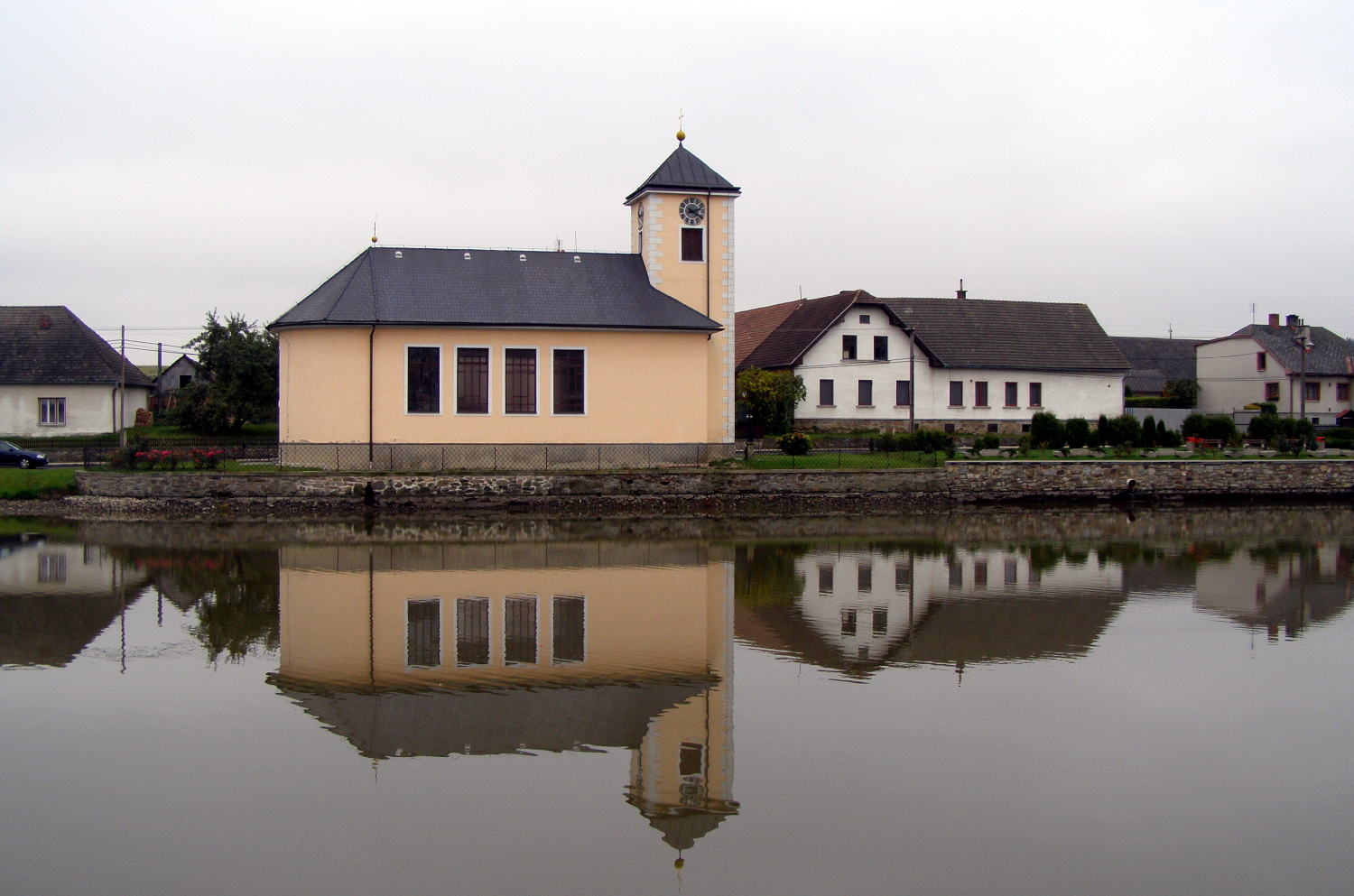
- Church of Saints John and Paul

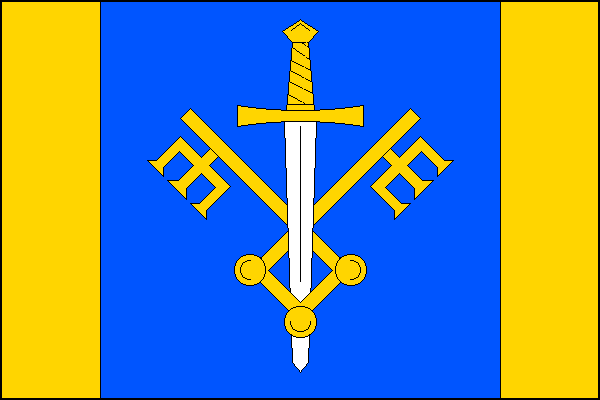
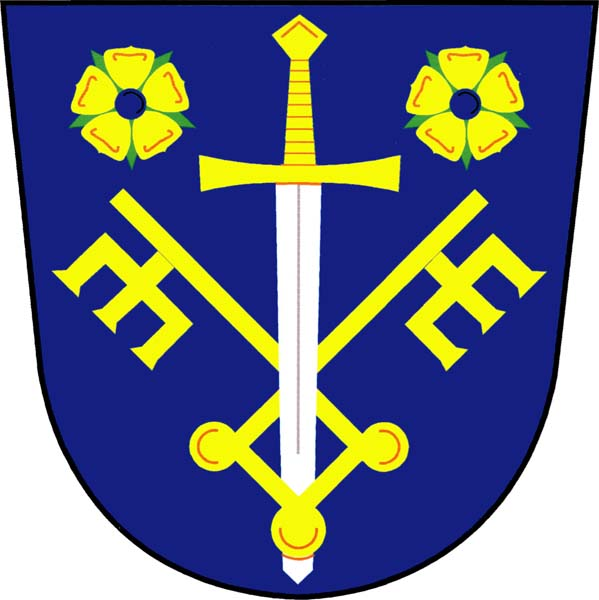
- Flag Coat of arms

- Location in the Czech Republic
- Coordinates: 49°24′47″N 15°42′2″E
- Country: Czech Republic
- Region: Vysočina
- District: Jihlava
- First mentioned: 1451

Area
  - Total: 8.89 km^{2} (3.43 sq mi)
- Elevation: 505 m (1,657 ft)

Population (2026-01-01)
  - Total: 461
  - Density: 51.9/km^{2} (134/sq mi)
- Time zone: UTC+1 (CET)
  - Summer (DST): UTC+2 (CEST)
- Postal code: 588 21
- Website: www.kozlov-jihlava.cz

Kozlov (Czech pronunciation: [ˈkozlof]; German: Koslau) is a municipality and village in Jihlava District in the Vysočina Region of the Czech Republic. It has about 500 inhabitants.

It lies approximately 8 kilometres (5 mi) east of Jihlava and 120 kilometres (75 mi) south-east of Prague.

== History ==
The first written mention of Kozlov is a 1451 deed issued by the abbey of Třebíč.

== Demographics ==
Historical population
Year	Pop.	±%
1869	472	—
1880	507	+7.4%
1890	657	+29.6%
1900	731	+11.3%
1910	685	−6.3%
1921	608	−11.2%
1930	580	−4.6%
1950	504	−13.1%
1961	464	−7.9%
1970	426	−8.2%
1980	437	+2.6%
1991	434	−0.7%
2001	450	+3.7%
2011	443	−1.6%
2021	450	+1.6%
Source: Censuses

== Notable people ==
- Matthias Sindelar (1903–1939), Austrian footballer
