= Juan de la Cruz Kairuz =

Argentine association football player

Personal information
- Date of birth: 15 March 1945 (age 81)
- Place of birth: Argentina
- Position: Defender

Senior career*
Years	Team	Apps	(Gls)
–1967	Atlanta	73	(0)
1968–1970	Newell's	61	(0)
1971	San Martín (Tucumán)	4	(0)
1973	Gimnasia	16	(0)
- * Club domestic league appearances and goals

Juan de la Cruz Kairuz (born 15 March 1945) is an Argentine former footballer who last played as a defender for Gimnasia.

== Early life ==
He started playing football at the age of twelve.

== Playing career ==
He started his career with Argentine side Atlanta. In 1968, he signed for Argentine side Newell's. He retired from professional football after suffering an injury. Altogether, he made 154 league appearances in the Argentine top flight.

== Style of play ==
He mainly operated as a left-back.

== Managerial career ==
After retiring from professional football, he worked as a manager.
