= Club Atlético Atlanta =

Multi-sports club in Argentina

Atlanta
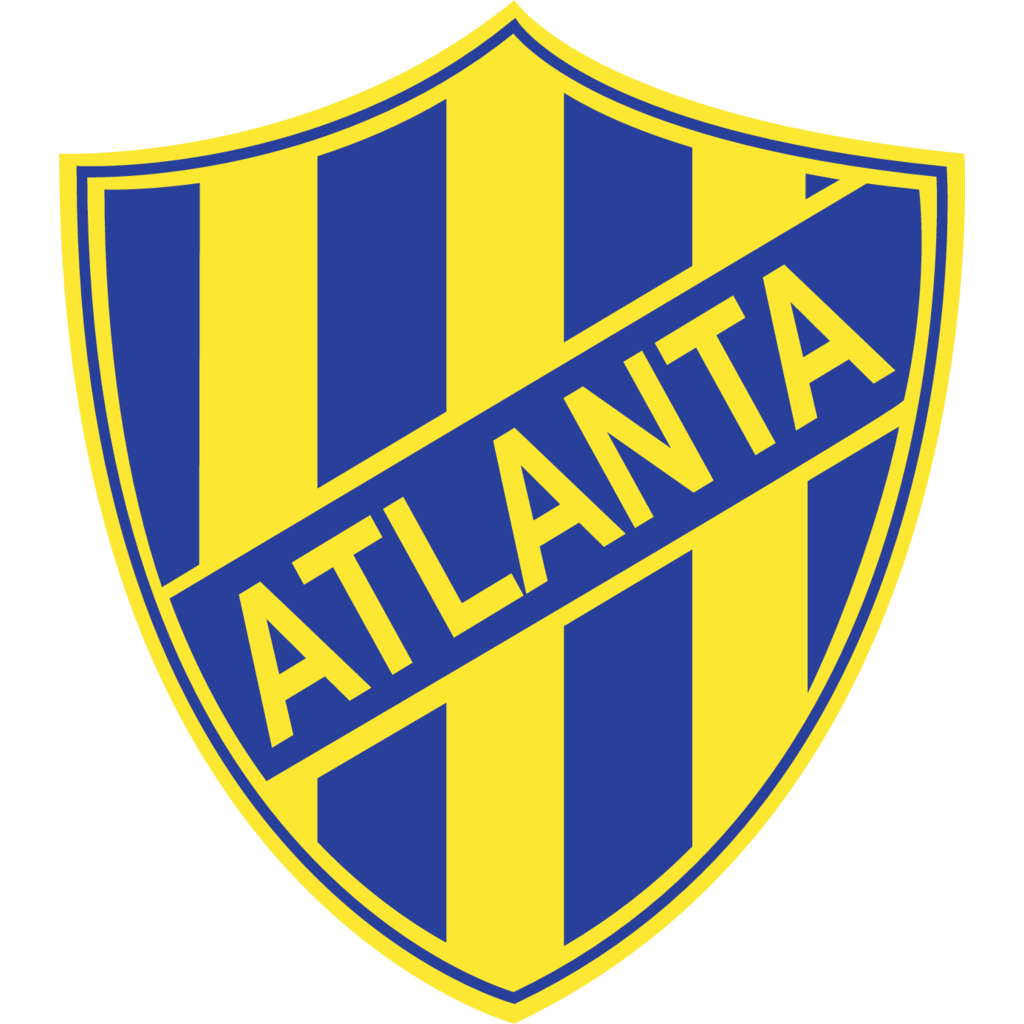
- Full name: Club Atlético Atlanta
- Nickname: Bohemios ("Bohemians")
- Founded: 12 October 1904; 122 years ago
- Ground: Estadio Don León Kolbowski, Villa Crespo, Buenos Aires
- Chairman: Gabriel Greco
- Manager: Cristian Pellerano
- League: Primera Nacional
- 2025: Primera Nacional Zone A, 2nd of 18
- Website: caatlanta.com.ar
Home colours	Away colours

Club Atlético Atlanta is an Argentine sports club from the Villa Crespo district of Buenos Aires. Nicknamed Los Bohemios ('The Bohemians'), Atlanta is mostly known for its football team, although the institution also hosts the practise of basketball, boxing, martial arts, handball and roller skating. The squad currently plays at Primera B Nacional, the second division of the Argentine football league system.

== History ==
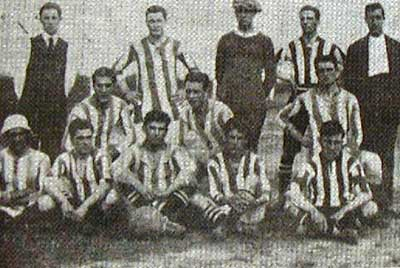
Atlanta in 1908.

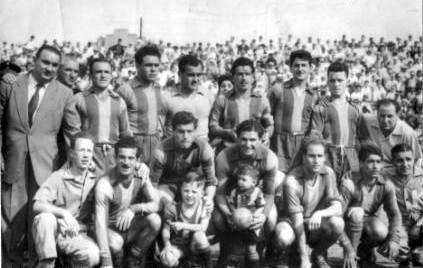
Atlanta team of 1956 that won the Primera B title.

The club was founded on 12 October 1904 in Buenos Aires, Argentina. One source says that the team got its name from an earthquake that had struck Atlanta, Georgia in the United States at the time the founders got together to inaugurate the club. Another version about its foundation states that the name "Atlanta" was taken from a navy ship that had arrived in the port of Buenos Aires when Manuel Quintana was proclaimed as President of Argentina. Elias Sanz was named as the club's first president.

The club's colors, yellow and blue, where chosen from the awnings that decorated the neighborhood's stores in those years. Atlanta's first home field was in Juan B. Alberdi y Escalada Avenue of the Villa Luro neighborhood, but the club would move repeatedly. This constant movement is the reason why the club was nicknamed Los Bohemios, the Bohemians, which has remained the nickname for the club and its supporters.

At the beginning of 1906, Atlanta was affiliated to the third division of the Argentine Football Association. The team debuted on 22 April 1906, winning its match against Racing. During its first season Atlanta reached the semifinals but then lost to Club Gath & Chaves by 2–0. That same year Atlanta merged with Club Atlético del Oeste, keeping its original name.

Atlanta won the third division championship in 1907, winning its first official title. The team defeated Gimnasia y Esgrima de Buenos Aires by 4–1 on 10 November. The highlight of that season was the thrashing victory over Independiente by 21–1. After winning the title, Atlanta debuted in the second division in 1908, winning the "Copa Bullrich" that played at the same time than regular season. The squad defeated Instituto Americano from Adrogué by 2–1 at the final, played on 8 September.

== In popular culture ==
The club is often associated with the Jewish community because of the historical support of Jews in the area of Villa Crespo; notable Jews have also been part of the team's administration and squad (e.g. Fabian Lagman and Jaime José Rotman).

== Derby ==
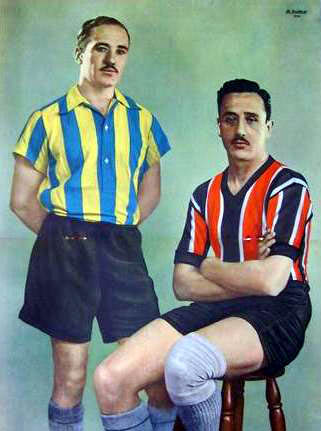
Santiago Carignano (Atlanta) and Francisco Santia (Chacarita), players that starred the derby of 1936.

Atlanta's main rival is Chacarita Juniors. The rivalry originated in 1922, when Chacarita established very close to Atlanta's home and stadium. The Funebrero stayed there until 1930 when they moved to San Martín, in Greater Buenos Aires, where they have remained since, although the rivalry with Atlanta never ended.

The first official match between both teams was on 13 November 1927 and Chacarita won 2–0. The first time Atlanta defeated the Funebrero was in 1930, with a score of 1–0. In the professional era, the first contest between Atlanta and Chacarita was on 4 June 1931, with Atlanta winning 3–1.

Atlanta and Chacarita have played each other 126 times: Atlanta have won 34, scoring 144 goals. On the other side, Chacarita have won 54 games and scored 191 goals. They have drawn 38 times. The biggest win achieved by Atlanta was in 1944, when they defeated Chacarita 7–1.

Santiago Rico played the most games for Atlanta with 16 appearances, while Luciano Agnolín is the top scorer with 7 goals.

== Stadium ==
The team stadium, "Don León Kolbovsky", is located in Villa Crespo neighborhood, in the city of Buenos Aires. It was inaugurated in 1960 during a match between Atlanta and Argentinos Juniors. Its name is a tribute to the man who presided the club when the stadium began to be built and has a capacity of 34,000. It is also known as the "Wooden Monumental", in reference to River Plate's Estadio Monumental, the biggest and with the largest capacity in Argentina.

In February 2005, the Government of Buenos Aires closed the stadium due to its poor sanitary and security conditions. In January 2006 the stadium was partially re-opened but it was closed again a month later. The same year Atlanta signed a contract with a company to build two concrete grandstands which would replace the wooden one that still stood there. Once the restructuring was finished, Atlanta could play its home games in its own stadium after three years. The León Kolbovsky was re-opened in March 2009, when Atlanta defeated Deportivo Español 3–1 with 6,000 supporters in the new concrete grandstands.

== Nickname ==
Since the team lacked an official home stadium for its first six decades, it was nicknamed "Los Bohemios", as the team would wander from place to place forced to play "home" games in other team's stadiums. The label is also associated with the fans, or any supporter of the team. The singular form, "El Bohemio", is also accepted and can be used when referring to the organization, or a particular player or the actual team.

== Napoleón ==
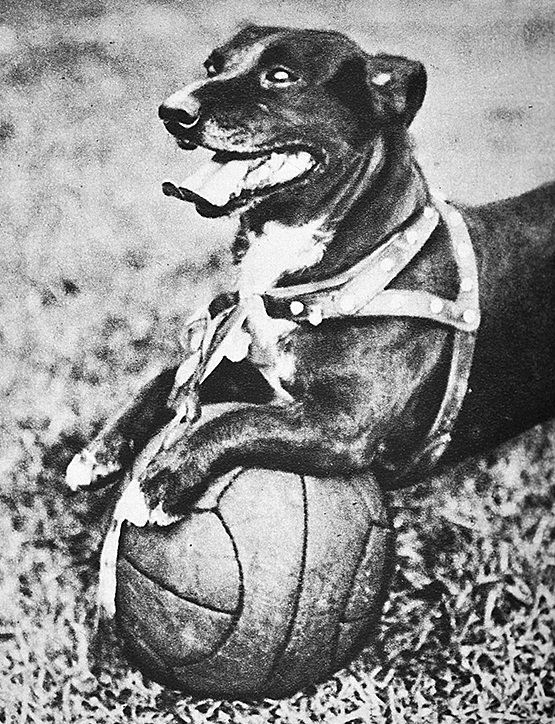
"Napoleón", the team's mascot, died in a car accident in 1938

One of the most curious cases in club history is that of a dog called "Napoleón" (whose name had been taken from the Emperor of the French). He was famous by 1936, when before each match disputed by Atlanta, he showed his skills with the ball to the spectators at the Villa Crespo stadium. His awesome ability was claimed even by rival supporters. He also barked fiercely when the rival team appeared on the field, and happily wagged his tail when Atlanta players appeared on the field. "Once the referee started the match, Napoleón took his place outside the field and followed the movements of the ball. During a corner kick, the dog always stood behind the goal."

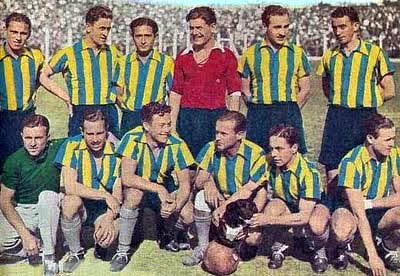
Napoleón posing with the team in 1936

Napoleón had been adopted by Atlanta players after a match against Talleres played in Remedios de Escalada. With him on the field, Atlanta scored four goals in the second half after down 5–1 at half-time (when Napoleón could not stay with the team on field). The match finally ended with a 5–5 tie and therefore Napoleón was adopted by Atlanta players as their mascot, because they thought he brought good luck to the team.

On 6 April 1938, a group of Atlanta supporters met at the house of Napoleón's owner, Francisco Belón. They were making the arrangements to take Napoleón to La Plata for the match Atlanta had to play against Estudiantes. He ran through a door left open, into the street, and was killed by a car. The newspaper Ahora titled the next day: "Napoleón, a true ace of Porteño football, passed away."

Napoleón was not buried, but his body was embalmed and kept by his owner, Francisco Belón, in the house of Villa Crespo where he lived. In October 2004, when Atlanta celebrated its 100th anniversary, it came back to the stadium (now called León Kolbovsky) as an exhibit of Francisco Belón's son, Osvaldo. Napoleón was one of the most beloved club figures, along with humans such as Osvaldo Miranda (proclaimed the most famous Atlanta fan by the team that evening) and Carlos Griguol.

== Current squad ==
As of 15 June 2022

Note: Flags indicate national team as defined under FIFA eligibility rules; some limited exceptions apply. Players may hold more than one non-FIFA nationality.

No.	Pos.	Nation	Player
—	GK	ARG	Ignacio Bessone
—	GK	ARG	Juan Francisco Rago
—	GK	ARG	Nicolás Sumavil
—	DF	ARG	Gabriel Carrasco
—	DF	ARG	Rodrigo Colombo
—	DF	ARG	Augusto Gallo
—	DF	ARG	Martín García
—	DF	ARG	Alan Gorosito
—	DF	ARG	Martin López (loan from Vélez)
—	DF	ARG	Matías Molina
—	DF	ARG	Alan Pérez
—	MF	ARG	Federico Bisanz
—	MF	ARG	Alejo Dramisino
—	MF	ARG	Ramón Fernández

No.	Pos.	Nation	Player
—	MF	ARG	Juan Galeano
—	MF	ARG	Maximiliano González
—	MF	ARG	Federico Marín (loan from Huracán)
—	MF	ARG	Franco Perinciolo (loan from Aldosivi)
—	MF	VEN	Daniel Saggiomo (loan from Argentinos)
—	FW	ARG	Evelio Cardozo (loan from Racing Club)
—	FW	ARG	Gonzalo Berterame (loan from San Lorenzo)
—	FW	ARG	Juan Bisanz
—	FW	ARG	Matías Donato (loan from Lanús)
—	FW	ARG	Gonzalo Klusener
—	FW	ARG	Julián Marcioni (loan from Newell's)
—	FW	ARG	Fabricio Pedrozo
—	FW	ARG	Lucas Ríos

=== Out on loan ===
Note: Flags indicate national team as defined under FIFA eligibility rules; some limited exceptions apply. Players may hold more than one non-FIFA nationality.

No.	Pos.	Nation	Player
—	GK	ARG	Ignacio Viaín (at San Martín de Burzaco until 31 December 2022)
—	DF	ARG	Axel Ochoa (at Belgrano until 31 December 2022)

No.	Pos.	Nation	Player
—	FW	ARG	Eugenio Olivera (at General Lamadrid until 31 December 2022)

== Former players ==
- (Argentina) Juan de la Cruz Kairuz

== Honours ==
=== Senior titles ===
Keys

- Record
- ^{(s)} Shared record

Type	Competition	Titles	Winning years
National (Cups)	Copa Suecia	1	1958

=== Other titles ===
Titles won in lower divisions:

- Primera División B (2): 1956, 1983
- Primera B Metropolitana (2): 1994–95, 2010–11
- Tercera División (1): 1907
- Copa Bullrich (1): 1908 (Note: The Copa Bullrich was an official football competition contested by clubs playing in the Second Division. The AFA has not included this competition into the list of national cups because only teams in Primera División participated in those competitions.)
