= Ignacio Viaín =

Argentine professional footballer

Personal information
- Date of birth: 9 July 1999 (age 27)
- Place of birth: Argentina
- Height: 1.75 m (5 ft 9 in)
- Position: Goalkeeper

Team information
- Current team: San Martín B. (on loan from Atlanta)

Youth career
- Atlanta

Senior career*
Years	Team	Apps	(Gls)
2018–	Atlanta	2	(0)
2021	→ El Porvenir (loan)	30	(0)
2022–	→ San Martín B. (loan)	1	(0)
- * Club domestic league appearances and goals as of 19:35, 14 June 2022 (UTC)

Ignacio Viaín (born 9 July 1999) is an Argentine professional footballer who plays as a goalkeeper for Atlanta.

== Career ==
Viaín made the breakthrough into senior football with Atlanta. He made two appearances in Primera B Metropolitana as an eighteen-year-old, featuring in a draw with Fénix on 7 April before playing the full duration again a month later against Tristán Suárez. In February 2021, Viaín was loaned out to Primera C Metropolitana club El Porvenir for the rest of the year. In January 2022, he was instead, loaned out to San Martín de Burzaco.

== Career statistics ==
As of 26 April 2019.

Appearances and goals by club, season and competition
Club	Season	League			Cup		League Cup		Continental		Other		Total	
Club	Season	Division	Apps	Goals	Apps	Goals	Apps	Goals	Apps	Goals	Apps	Goals	Apps	Goals
Atlanta	2017–18	Primera B Metropolitana	2	0	0	0	—		—		0	0	2	0
Atlanta	2018–19	Primera B Metropolitana	0	0	0	0	—		—		0	0	0	0
Career total			2	0	0	0	—		—		0	0	2	0
