= František Bican =

Czech footballer (1891–1921)

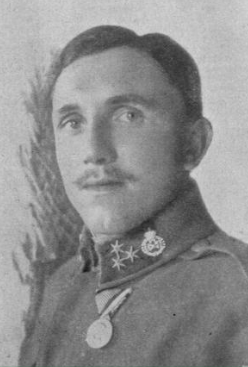

Personal information
- Date of birth: 1891
- Place of birth: Sedlice, Bohemia, Austria-Hungary
- Date of death: 1921
- Place of death: Vienna, Austria
- Position(s): Forward

Senior career*
Years	Team	Apps	(Gls)
1912–1921	Hertha Vienna	55	(17)
- *Club domestic league appearances and goals

František "Franz" Bican (1891–1921) was a Czech professional footballer who played as a forward for Hertha Vienna,

== Club career ==
Bican made his official debut for Hertha Vienna on 9 September 1912, in 3–0 loss to Wr. Amateur SV. Hertha Vienna just survived a relegation battle this season against Wacker Vienna as Bican scored four goals in six games.

== Personal life ==
František was married to Ludmila Bicanová, née Kopecká. They went on to have three children; František Bican in 1910, Josef Bican in 1913 and Vilík Bican in 1918. František’s father was also called František. His father had another son who was called Josef. His grandson was Ivan Bican, who played football for Škoda Plzeň.

== Death ==
Bican sustained an injury after being tackled at the kidney studs up. The kidney got infected. František died at the early age of 30 in 1921 after refusing an operation on his infected kidney. This was when František was just 10, Josef was 8 and Vilík was 3. Hertha Vienna officials gave František a nice funeral and told Ludmila that they would take care of her sons and would even give them an education. At first they visited the boys every day and would bring something to help out. However this soon changed as they would come every week, once a fortnight and within three months it was as if they had forgotten about the Bican family.
