= Matthias Sindelar =

Austrian footballer (1903–1939)

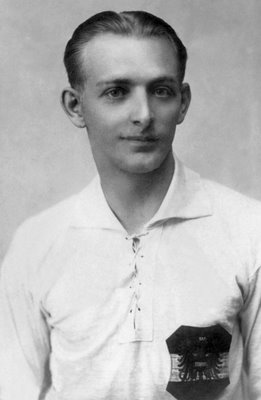

Personal information
- Full name: Matthias Sindelar
- Birth name: Matěj Šindelář
- Date of birth: 10 February 1903
- Place of birth: Kozlov, Moravia, Austria-Hungary
- Date of death: 23 January 1939 (aged 35)
- Place of death: Vienna, Nazi Germany
- Height: 1.75 m (5 ft 9 in)
- Position: Centre-forward

Youth career
- 1918–1922: Hertha Vienna

Senior career*
Years	Team	Apps	(Gls)
1921–1924	Hertha Vienna	23	(4)
1924–1939	Austria Wien	312	(240)
Total		335	(244)

International career
1926–1937	Austria	43	(26)
Medal record
Men's football
Representing Austria
Central European International Cup
Silver medal – second place	1927–30 Central European International Cup
Central European International Cup
Gold medal – first place	1931–32 Central European International Cup
Central European International Cup
Silver medal – second place	1933–35 Central European International Cup
- * Club domestic league appearances and goals

Matthias Sindelar (German: [maˈtiːas ˈʃɪndəlaːɐ̯], Czech: Matěj Šindelář; 10 February 1903 – 23 January 1939) was an Austrian professional footballer. Regarded as one of the greatest Austrian players of all time, Sindelar notably played for Austria Vienna and the national side.

He played as a centre-forward for the celebrated Austrian national side of the early 1930s that became known as the Wunderteam, which he captained at the 1934 World Cup. Known as "The Mozart of football" or Der Papierene ("The Paper Man") for his slight build, he was renowned as one of the finest pre-war footballers, known for his fantastic dribbling ability and creativity. He was voted the best Austrian footballer of the 20th Century in a 1999 poll by the International Federation of Football History and Statistics (IFFHS) and was named Austria's sportsman of the century a year before.

With the Wunderteam, Sindelar was one of the key elements of their developing formation and style of play as it evolved into a 2-3-5. According to specialists like Paul Dietschy, this formation provided "such fluidity to the Austrian system", leading to its earning the nickname of "the Viennese whirlpool". Although the Wunderteam regularly lacked efficiency, Sindelar's individual technical skill and vision often compensated for these issues.

== Early years ==
Of Czech descent, Sindelar was born Matěj Šindelář (Czech: [ˈmacɛj ˈʃɪndɛlaːr̝̊]) in Kozlov, Moravia, then part of the Austro-Hungarian Empire, the son of Jan Šindelář, a blacksmith, and his wife Marie (née Švengrová). Despite occasional claims that Sindelar was of Jewish origin, the family was Catholic. These claims most likely arise from his main club, Austria Vienna's connection to Vienna's Jewish population.

They moved to Vienna in 1905 and settled in the predominantly working-class district of Favoriten, which had a large Czech-speaking community. Young Matěj, whose name would be Germanized as Matthias, began playing football in the streets with the other children of the neighbourhood, many of whom were immigrants from Bohemia and Moravia. Notably, he grew up alongside his future Austrian teammate Josef Bican.

According to many sources, upon the death of his father, Sindelar took up a job as either an apprentice mechanic or a locksmith; during this time, he also had many other odd jobs, such as selling sporting goods to the people of Vienna.

== Club career ==
Sindelar began his footballing career with Hertha Vienna, whom he joined in 1918. This opportunity arose when, at the age of fifteen, he was spotted by a scout, who signed him up for Hertha's youth teams. Already considered to be "an excellent dribbler and finisher" as a teenager, Sindelar had quickly progressed into the first team by the early 1920s.

Playing in the blue and white jersey of Hertha, Sindelar quickly learned to compensate for his rather frail, infantile physique through the development of his high-level technique, allowing him "to dodge and dribble at will his opponents, and to squeeze with disconcerting ease (through gaps in [sic]) the opposing defences”. It is these characteristics which make him obtain the nickname of “der Papierene” ("the Paper man").

Sindelar quickly earnt his keep at Hertha Vienna, scoring his first goals in the national championship, in particular, thanks to his quick feet, and becoming a vital cog in their team. Both his and the club's fortunes took a turn for the worse, however, as Sindelar suffered a serious knee injury in May 1923, making him indefinitely unavailable. Concurrently, Hertha also went through a great economic crisis and Sindelar, as well as some of his teammates, were made redundant. In his time at Hertha Vienna, Sindelar scored 4 goals in 23 matches.

=== Austria Vienna ===
Now a free agent but still injured, Sindelar consulted the club doctor of SV Amateure who suggested that he should undergo meniscus surgery. At the time, such an operation was operation considered quite risky as it could mark the end of his career. Feeling that such a risk was necessary to take Sindelar had the surgery and, once successfully healed, signed for SV Amateure in 1924, who were at the time Austrian league and cup champions. In 1926, SV Amateure would become professional and take on its current name of FK Austria Vienna.

His time at Austria Vienna coincided with one of the club's most successful spells pre-War. He helped the team win the Austrian Cup five times across an eleven-year spell - in 1925, 1926, 1933, 1935 and 1936. He also won an 1. League title in 1926, and the Mitropa Cup twice, in 1933 and 1936 respectively. Much like his time at Hertha Vienna, Sindelar was a center forward and utilised his technical ability, talent on the ball, and eye for goal to overcome his physical disadvantages. He was also seen as a great leader in the pitch. Gifted with 'ankle-breaking' agility his ability to beat the defender one-on-one was often described as 'exceptional'. In this sense, he is often compared in terms of modern-day footballers to counterparts such as Ferenc Puskás.

Overall, in 703 matches for Austria Vienna, he scored 600 goals and In 2001 was named in their Team of the Century.

In 1938 he appeared as himself in the Austrian film Roxy and the Wonderteam.

== International career ==
=== Austria national team ===
From 1926 to 1937, Sindelar was capped 43 times for his country, scoring 26 goals. He scored four goals in his first three international matches, including one in his debut match, a 2–1 victory over Czechoslovakia on 28 September 1926. Sindelar became an essential part of the Austrian Wunderteam that was coached by Hugo Meisl, until the two later had a falling out. Writer David Goldblatt described the events:

He made his international debut in 1926 and played well before falling out of favour with the disciplinarian Meisl. Four years in the international wilderness followed until Meisl was cornered by a gathering of the city's leading football commentators as he sat in the Ring Café in 1931. Everyone was arguing for Sindelar's recall and Meisl changed his mind. Sindelar played. Scotland were beaten and the Wunderteam – already disciplined, organized, hardworking and professional – acquired their playmaker and inspiration, that vital spark of unpredictability.

=== 1927–30 Central European International Cup ===
while Austria had not quite earned the moniker of Wunderteam yet, a young Sindelar helped them to their first major international tournament performance, being a part of the squad that made Runners-up in the Central European International Cup.

=== 1931–32 Central European International Cup ===
The Wunderteam started by winning the Central European International Cup: 1931–32, Sindelar scoring 4 goals to help Austria win its first and so far only international Trophy.

=== 1933–35 Central European International Cup ===
This time around The Wunderteam finished as Runners-up. Sindelar scoring 3 goals to make him Austria's all-time top goalscorer at the Central European International Cup.

=== 1934 World Cup ===
Sindelar and Austria made the whole world their stage at the 1934 World Cup, where they truly earned their nickname of the "Wunderteam". The high point came with their win over Hungary in the quarterfinals, when Sindelar was matched up against centre-half György Sárosi, who would go on to claim a runners-up medal at the following World Cup in France. In a bruising encounter, one Hungarian was sent off, and Johann Horvath, the Austrian midfielder, was injured and missed the semi-final against Italy. Austria was then defeated by the host nation, with Sindelar affected by the harsh marking of Luis Monti.

=== Austria v Germany 1938 ===
On 3 April 1938, the Austrian team played Germany in the Prater Stadium in Vienna. This match was significant as, just a few weeks earlier Nazi Germany had annexed Austria (known as the Anschluss), and had absorbed the national team into that of Nazi Germany, ignoring their qualification for that summer's World Cup. Thus, this would be Austria's last international match until after the Second World War. This was and is seen by many as a great tragedy for Austrian football as they feel that Austria were one of the favourites to lift that year's World Cup trophy.

The match dubbed the "Anschlussspiel" in German (lit. Anschluss game), was planned as a celebration by the Nazi regime of the Anschluss and Austria's "coming home to the Reich". At Sindelar's behest, the Austrian team played in red-white-red strips which mimicked the Austrian flag's colours instead of their traditional white and black strips. Austria squandered many easy goalscoring opportunities during the match in a way that looked deliberate. However, in the last 20 minutes, Sindelar and teammate Karl Sesta both scored as the game finished 2–0. Sindelar is claimed to have celebrated extravagantly in front of senior Nazi dignitaries.

== Death and myth ==
Refusing to leave his home country, Sindelar refused to play for the new Germany national team citing old age (by this point he was 35 years old) and injury as the cause.

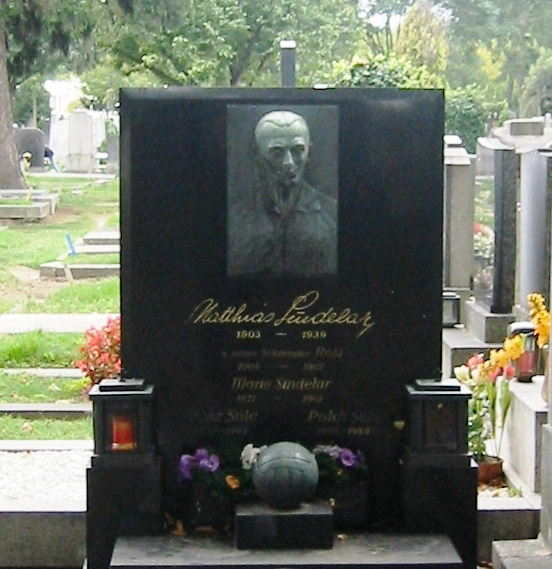
Sindelar's grave at Vienna's Zentralfriedhof

On 23 January 1939, both Sindelar and his girlfriend Camilla Castagnola were found dead at the apartment they shared in Vienna; the official verdict cited carbon monoxide poisoning as the cause. Different theories speculated that his death was an accident, suicide or murder.

Austrian writer Friedrich Torberg later dedicated the poem "Auf den Tod eines Fußballspielers" ("On the death of a footballer") to Sindelar. The poem suggested that he had committed suicide as a result of the German Anschluss of Austria in 1938. On the other hand, it has been thought and reported that his death was accidental, caused by a defective chimney. A neighbour had reported a defective chimney in the block a few days before Sindelar's death. However, in a 2000s documentary screened on the BBC, Egon Ulbrich, a lifelong friend of Sindelar, stated that a local official was bribed to record his death as an accident, which ensured that he would receive a state funeral. "According to the Nazi rules, a person who had been murdered or who has committed suicide cannot be given a grave of honour. So we had to do something to ensure that the criminal element involved in his death was removed," he stated. It has also been suggested that Sindelar was killed for his opposition for the Anschluss. The Gestapo notably had a file on him and had kept his café under surveillance.

== Career statistics ==
=== Club ===
Appearances and goals by club, season and competition
Club	Season	League		Cup		Mitropa Cup		Total	
Club	Season	Apps	Goals	Apps	Goals	Apps	Goals	Apps	Goals
Hertha Vienna	1921–22	8	0	0	0	0	0	8	0
Hertha Vienna	1922–23	17	3	1	0	0	0	18	3
Hertha Vienna	1923–24	8	0	1	0	0	0	9	0
Austria Vienna	1924–25	17	4	0	0	0	0	17	4
Austria Vienna	1925–26	7	2	5	4	0	0	12	6
Austria Vienna	1926–27	23	18	5	3	0	0	28	21
Austria Vienna	1927–28	19	8	2	1	0	0	21	9
Austria Vienna	1928–29	21	7	3	1	0	0	24	8
Austria Vienna	1929–30	18	15	6	1	0	0	24	16
Austria Vienna	1930–31	17	14	9	8	0	0	26	24
Austria Vienna	1931–32	22	15	1	0	0	0	23	15
Austria Vienna	1932–33	21	11	5	6	0	0	26	17
Austria Vienna	1933–34	21	22	3	4	6	5	30	31
Austria Vienna	1934–35	15	9	4	7	2	1	21	17
Austria Vienna	1935–36	17	8	5	6	7	8	29	22
Austria Vienna	1936–37	21	13	4	5	10	4	35	22
Austria Vienna	1937–38	15	9	1	0	6	6	22	15
Austria Vienna	1938–39	11	0	1	0	1	0	12	0
Austria Vienna	Total	298	158	56	46	31	24	385	228

=== International caps and goals ===
The following is a list of Sindelar's international appearances and goals with the Austria national football team.

Cap #	Date	Location	Type of match	Result	Opponent	Minutes played	Goals	Notes
1	28 Sep 1926	Prague	Friendly	2–1	Czechoslovakia	90	1	
2	10 Oct 1926	Vienna	Friendly	7–1	Switzerland	90	2	
3	7 Nov 1926	Vienna	Friendly	3–1	Sweden	90	1	
4	20 Mar 1927	Vienna	Friendly	1–2	Czechoslovakia	90	0	
5	10 Apr 1927	Vienna	Friendly	6–0	Hungary	48	0	
6	6 May 1928	Vienna	Friendly	3–0	Yugoslavia	90	0	
7	28 Oct 1928	Vienna	Central European International Cup	2–0	Switzerland	90	0	
8	23 Mar 1930	Prague	Friendly	2–2	Czechoslovakia	90	0	
9	16 May 1931	Vienna	Friendly	5–0	Scotland	90	1	
10	24 May 1931	Berlin	Friendly	6–0	Germany	90	0	
11	14 Sep 1931	Vienna	Friendly	5-0	Germany	90	3	
12	4 Oct 1931	Budapest	Central European International Cup	2–2	Hungary	90	0	
13	29 Nov 1931	Basel	Central European International Cup	8–1	Switzerland	90	1	
14	20 Mar 1932	Vienna	Central European International Cup	2–1	Italy	90	2	
15	24 Apr 1932	Vienna	Friendly	8–2	Hungary	90	3	
16	22 May 1932	Prague	Central European International Cup	1–1	Czechoslovakia	90	1	
17	17 Jul 1932	Stockholm	Friendly	4–3	Sweden	90	1	
18	2 Oct 1932	Budapest	Friendly	3–2	Hungary	90	0	
19	23 Oct 1932	Vienna	Central European International Cup	3–1	Switzerland	90	0	
20	7 Dec 1932	London	Friendly	3–4	England	90	1	
21	12 Feb 1933	Paris	Friendly	4–0	France	90	1	
22.	9 April 1933	Vienna	Friendly	1–2	Czechoslovakia	90	0	
23	30 Apr 1933	Budapest	Friendly	1–1	Hungary	90	0	
24	11 Jun 1933	Vienna	Friendly	4–1	Belgium	90	1	
25	17 Sep 1933	Prague	Friendly	3–3	Czechoslovakia	90	2	
26	1 Oct 1933	Vienna	Friendly	2–2	Hungary	90	0	
27	29 Nov 1933	Glasgow	Friendly	2–2	Scotland	90	0	
28	10 Dec 1933	Amsterdam	Friendly	1–0	Netherlands	90	0	
29	15 Apr 1934	Vienna	Friendly	5–2	Hungary	90	0	
30	25 Apr 1934	Vienna	World Cup qualification	6–1	Bulgaria	90	1	
31	27 May 1934	Turin	1934 FIFA World Cup	3–2	France	120	1	
32	31 May 1934	Bologna	1934 FIFA World Cup	2–1	Hungary	90	0	
33	3 Jun 1934	Milan	1934 FIFA World Cup	0–1	Italy	90	0	
34	23 Sep 1934	Vienna	Central European International Cup	2–2	Czechoslovakia	90	0	
35	7 Oct, 1934	Budapest	Central European International Cup	1–3	Hungary	90	0	
36	24 Mar 1935	Vienna	Central European International Cup	0–2	Italy	90	0	
37	6 May 1936	Vienna	Friendly	2–1	England	90	0	
38	17 May 1936	Rome	Friendly	2–2	Italy	90	0	
39	27 Sep 1936	Budapest	Central European International Cup	3–5	Hungary	90	2	
40	21 Mar 1937	Vienna	Central European International Cup	2–0	Italy	73	0	
41	9 May 1937	Vienna	Friendly	1–1	Scotland	90	0	
42	23 May 1937	Budapest	Friendly	2–2	Hungary	90	0	
43	19 Sep 1937	Vienna	Central European International Cup	4–3	Switzerland	90	1	
Totals						3841	26	
==	3 Apr 1938	Vienna	Friendly	2–0	Germany	90	1	

== Honours ==
Sindelar was ranked as Austria's best footballer of the twentieth century by the IFFHS, also ranking as the world's 22nd best. His career titles include:

Austria Wien

- 1. Liga: 1926; runner-up 1925, 1937
- Austrian Cup: 1925, 1926, 1933, 1935, 1936
- Mitropa Cup: 1933, 1936

Austria

- FIFA World Cup semi-finals: 1934
- Central European International Cup: 1931–32; runner-up 1927–30, 1933–35

Individual

- FIFA World Cup Silver Ball: 1934
- Central European International Cup best player: 1927–30, 1933–35
- Mitropa Cup top scorer: 1933
- IFFHS Austrian player of the century: 1999
