= 1948 Czechoslovak First League =

Czechoslovak First League
- Season: 1948
- Dates: 13 August – 5 December
- Top goalscorer: Josef Bican (21 goals)

Statistics of Czechoslovak First League in the 1948 season.

== Overview ==
It was contested by 14 teams, and SK Slavia Prague led the league after 13 matches. However the season was interrupted due to league reorganisation and no championship was awarded. Josef Bican was the league's top scorer with 21 goals.

== Stadia and locations ==
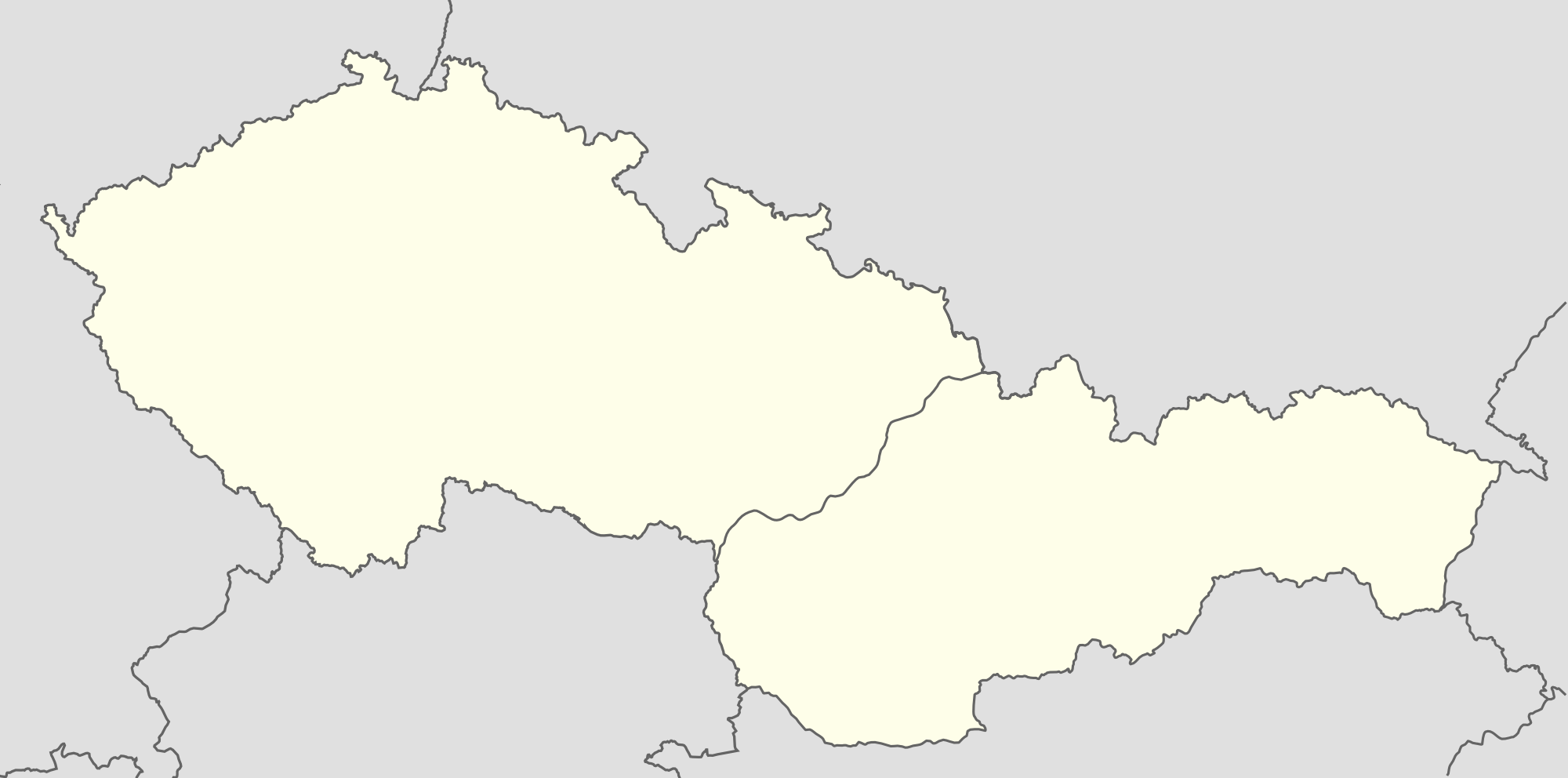
Location of clubs in the 1948 Czechoslovak First League

== League standings ==
Pos	Team	Pld	W	D	L	GF	GA	GR	Pts
1	Sokol Slavia Prague VII	13	8	2	3	71	33	2.152	18
2	Viktoria Plzeň	13	8	2	3	37	22	1.682	18
3	Sparta Bubeneč	13	8	1	4	42	22	1.909	17
4	Bohemians Prague	13	6	5	2	37	24	1.542	17
5	SK Žilina	13	7	3	3	25	24	1.042	17
6	NV Trnava	13	5	4	4	25	24	1.042	14
7	Jednota Košice	13	5	3	5	23	24	0.958	13
8	ATK Prague	13	5	2	6	20	27	0.741	12
9	Sokol Teplice	13	4	3	6	27	27	1.000	11
10	NV Bratislava	13	4	3	6	20	22	0.909	11
11	Slezská Ostrava	13	4	3	6	23	35	0.657	11
12	SK Kladno	13	3	2	8	32	42	0.762	8
13	Zbrojovka Židenice	13	3	2	8	21	43	0.488	8
14	Manet Považská Bystrica	13	3	1	9	23	57	0.404	7

Source: rsssf.com

== Results ==
Home \ Away	ATK	BOH	KOŠ	POV	NVB	TRN	KLA	ŽIL	OST	SLA	TEP	BUB	PLZ	BRN
ATK Prague						0–1	5–1	0–1		2–8		0–4		2–1
Bohemians Prague	3–0		2–2		0–0	4–1				4–4			1–4	5–0
Jednota Košice	1–1			2–1		1–2					2–1	3–1		3–1
Manet Považská Bystrica	1–1	2–6			3–1				2–3				1–2	4–3
NV Bratislava	1–2		0–3			0–1	3–0	2–3		5–4				3–1
NV Trnava				6–1			1–1	2–2		4–4	1–3	1–3		
SK Kladno		1–3	3–1	8–1				8–1	2–2		1–3	3–5		
SK Žilina		2–2	3–0	3–1					1–2		2–1	1–0	3–3	
Slezská Ostrava	1–4	2–3	2–2		2–1	3–1							1–3	2–2
Sokol Slavia Prague VII			5–2	12–1			11–2	1–2	5–2		3–2	4–0		
Sokol Teplice	2–0	2–2		2–3	1–1				5–0				2–5	
Sparta Bubeneč		4–2		8–2	2–2				4–1		6–2		5–0	
Viktoria Plzeň	2–3		2–1		0–1	0–0	3–0			4–3				9–1
Zbrojovka Židenice						2–4	3–2	2–1		3–7	1–1	1–0		

Source: statistiky1ligy.fotbal.cz
Legend: Blue = home team win; Yellow = draw; Red = away team win.
