= Ján Andrejkovič =

Czechoslovak footballer (born 1934)

Personal information
- Date of birth: 17 July 1934 (age 92)
- Positions: Striker; defender

Senior career*
Years	Team	Apps	(Gls)
1953–1958	Dynamo Prague		
1958–1959	Slovan Bratislava		
1960–1961	Dynamo Prague		
Total		152	(16)

International career
1958	Czechoslovakia	1	(0)
1958	Czechoslovakia B	2	(0)
- * Club domestic league appearances and goals

Ján Andrejkovič (born 17 July 1934) is a Slovak former footballer who played as a defender and striker. He played 152 times in the Czechoslovak First League, scoring 16 goals, as well as representing the national team of Czechoslovakia once. At club level he played for Dynamo Prague (later known as Slavia) and Slovan Bratislava. He was one of three players to make his debut for Czechoslovakia in Prague on 30 August 1958 in a 2–1 friendly loss against the Soviet Union. Andrejkovič was, along with team-mate Josef Moravec, one of the last two surviving Slavia players to have taken part in the first match at Stadion Eden in 1953. He left football at the age of 27 and became an engineer.
