= Wunderteam =

Austrian national football team of the 1930s

Wunderteam (German pronunciation: [ˈvʊndɐˌtiːm]; Wonder Team) was the name given to the Austria national football team of the 1930s. Led by manager Hugo Meisl, the team had an unbeaten streak of 14 games between April 1931 and December 1932. The style of the team focused on quick passing introduced by Englishman Jimmy Hogan. The forward line was complemented by wide half-backs and an attacking centre-half. Matthias Sindelar, Josef Bican, Anton Schall, Josef Smistik and Walter Nausch were the referents of the team that would dominate European football during that era. Matthias Sindelar, known as Der Papierene (The Paper-thin Man) due to his slight build, was the star and captain of the team.

== Profile and history ==
=== Rise to fame and success ===
In the early 1930s, Austria became a very celebrated team in Europe. Before the 1934 FIFA World Cup, they routed many of their opponents, including a 5-0 and a 6–0 victory over Germany, a 6–0 victory over Switzerland, and an 8–2 victory over Hungary. They also won the Central European International Cup, predecessor of the European Championship, by beating Italy 4–2 in 1932. The cup was to be Wunderteam's only championship win.

=== 1934 World Cup ===
Austria entered the 1934 World Cup as one of the favorites. In the quarter-final they eliminated Hungary, which was to be the runner-up in the 1938 edition. Like the Golden Team of Hungary 20 years later, Austria failed to lift the World Cup trophy, despite playing beautiful football. They were eliminated by the eventual champion Italy in the semi-final, a match under poor weather conditions that limited their movement of the ball. The only score came when the Austrian goalkeeper was pushed over the line. Referee Ivan Eklind was criticized for partiality toward the host nation, especially after he also refereed the final, which Italy also won. Austria finished fourth after losing 2–3 to Germany in the third place match.

=== World War II and the end of the team ===
The death of Hugo Meisl in 1937 marked the beginning of the end. Austria qualified for the 1938 FIFA World Cup finals, but they withdrew less than three months before the start of the tournament, after the March 1938 Anschluss to Nazi Germany. The Austrian Soccer Federation dissolved and voluntarily integrated itself into the "Deutschen Reichsbund für Leibesübungen" that coordinated all sports in Nazi-Germany. For political reasons, German officials demanded that players from "Hitler's home state" play in the Germany national team, ordering coach Herberger to change the lineup on short notice. Several Austrian players were capped for the combined team failed to live up to expectations, as they were eliminated in the first round. That World Cup campaign was Germany's worst ever World Cup finals performance until 2018. Matthias Sindelar, who did not play for Germany, was found dead in his home in 1939, under circumstances that have been debated since.

=== Influence on Total Football ===
The ill-fated Austrian Wunderteam is also credited in some circles as being the first national team to play Total Football. It is no coincidence that Ernst Happel, a talented Austrian player in the 1940s and 1950s, was coach in the Netherlands in the late 1960s and early 1970s. He introduced a tougher style of play at the clubs ADO and Feyenoord, and managed the Netherlands national team in the 1978 FIFA World Cup, where they finished as runners-up for the second time in a row.

== See also ==
- Austria national alpine ski team
