= Willy Meisl =

Austrian sports journalist

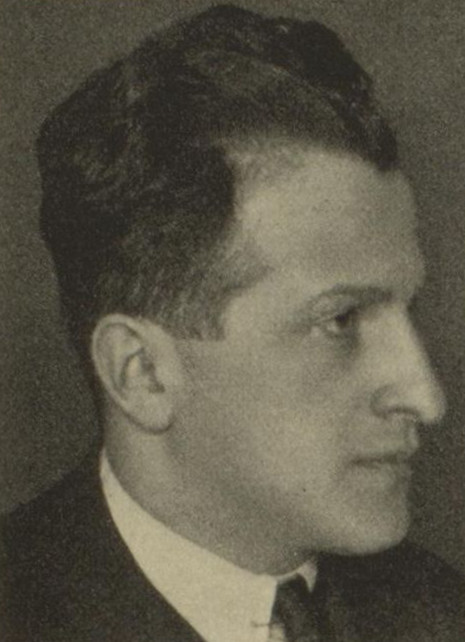
- Portrait of Meisl Wilhelm in 1927

Personal information
- Full name: Wilhelm Meisl
- Date of birth: 26 December 1895
- Place of birth: Vienna, Austria-Hungary
- Date of death: 12 June 1968 (aged 72)
- Place of death: Locarno, Switzerland

Senior career*
Years	Team	Apps	(Gls)
- Austria Wien

International career
1920	Austria	1	(0)

Managerial career
- 1923–1925: Hammarby IF
- * Club domestic league appearances and goals

Wilhelm "Willy" Meisl (26 December 1895 in Vienna – 12 June 1968 in Locarno) was an Austrian-Jewish sports journalist in the 20th century. He was the brother of Austrian national football manager Hugo Meisl.

Meisl was an avid sportsman, playing football, tennis, water polo and boxing before he turned to sports writing. In 1920, his brother Hugo fielded him in an international game against Hungary, giving him his only international football appearance. Meisl's writings did much to transform how football was perceived and played throughout continental Europe. In 1955, he coined the phrase 'The Whirl' to describe the play of his brother's Austrian 'Wunderteam' of the 1930s. He wrote: "We must free our soccer youth from the shackles of playing to order, along rails as it were. We must give them ideas and encourage them to develop their own".

Meisl's early career showed an inclination toward sports and participation. He played amateur football as a goalkeeper in Vienna, and was even selected for the national side by his brother. He played tennis, boxed, swam, played water polo and later coached the Swedish side Hammarby Fotboll for two seasons from 1923. He completed legal studies in the early 1920s but his career was in print, working for a Berlin newspaper (Vossische Zeitung) from 1924 to 1933 before establishing himself as an astute author and editor. His work was also part of the literature event in the art competition at the 1928 Summer Olympics.

Following the Nazis' seizure of power in Germany, he emigrated to the United Kingdom in January 1934 and continued as a journalist. He worked in the press department of the British Olympic Committee prior to the 1936 Summer Olympics in Berlin, joined the British Army, and was a staff member of the Foreign Office from 1943 to 1946.

In 1946, Meisl returned to journalism, becoming a sports correspondent based in London writing for the Swedish newspapers Dagens Nyheter and Expressen, as well as some English, Swiss, Austrian and German newspapers. Throughout his journalistic career he wrote numerous sports essays, including the monograph Soccer Revolution in 1955 in which he highlighted the value of his brother Hugo's tactical ideas, and is considered one of the founding fathers of modern sports journalism. For instance, in 1954, British weekly World Sports accorded Meisl the title: “World’s No. 1 Soccer Critic”. After leaving journalism he moved to Lugano, Switzerland, where he died of cancer after a long battle on 12 June 1968.
