= Hugo Meisl =

Austrian football coach (1881–1937)

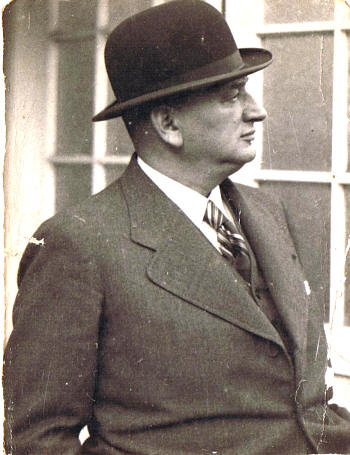
- Meisl in 1930s

Personal information
- Date of birth: 16 November 1881
- Place of birth: Maleschau, Bohemia
- Date of death: 17 February 1937 (aged 55)
- Place of death: Vienna, Austria

Managerial career
- Years: Team
- 1912–1914: Austria-Hungary
- 1912–1913: Wiener Amateure
- 1919–1937: Austria

Hugo Meisl (16 November 1881 – 17 February 1937) was the multi-lingual football coach of the famous Austrian 'Wunderteam' of the early 1930s, as well as a referee. He was the brother of sports journalist Willy Meisl.

== Background and early career ==
Meisl was born to a Jewish family in Bohemia, starting out as a bank clerk after moving to Vienna in 1895 but soon developed an interest in football, playing as a winger for the Vienna Cricket and Football-Club. In his early 30s, following a short playing career, he found employment as an administrator with the Austrian Football Association, rising to the position of General Secretary. In the 1912 Olympic Games in Stockholm, Meisl appeared as a match referee. He had previously refereed the first international match between Hungary and England on 10 June 1908.

== Influence on the development of international football competitions ==
Meisl's enthusiasm for the game resulted in the development of a Central European club tournament: the Mitropa Cup, the development of the Central European International Cup and the development of professional League football in Austria in 1924. His interest in football led him to develop friendships throughout Europe most notably with Vittorio Pozzo in Italy and Herbert Chapman in England. Another English coach, Jimmy Hogan, who worked in Vienna, helped Meisl develop a technique for dispensing with aerial passing and placing emphasis on groundwork.

== Austrian 'Wunderteam' ==
Meisl became coach of the Austrian national side in 1913 alongside Heinrich Retschury, assuming full control in 1919 and oversaw their rise to prominence in the late 1920s and early 1930s. The 14-match unbeaten run of the Austrian national side from 12 April 1931 until 7 December 1932 placed the Austrians at the forefront of international football; they had routed most of their European rivals. Among their players was Matthias Sindelar, the man of paper, 'Der Papierene', known for his ability to glide past rough challengers. On 11 February 1934 the Austrians beat Italy in Turin 4-2 (3-0 at half-time) in the Central European International Cup competition: a defeat that signalled the end of the international career of the Italian captain Umberto Caligaris and rightly made the Austrians one of the strong favourites going into the 1934 World Cup.

== 1934 World Cup ==
During that tournament Austria renewed their rivalry with their neighbours Hungary in a game that saw one player sent-off, a penalty awarded to Hungary and an injury to Johann Horvath that would rule him out of the semi-final against Italy. The Italians would win that game, an early goal and desperate defending ensuring the hosts won through to the final. A goal would also separate the sides in the Gold-medal match at the 1936 Summer Olympics in Berlin.

For his achievements as a football coach, Hugo Meisl was awarded the Knight’s Cross of the Austrian Order of Merit and the Silver Decoration for Services to the Republic of Austria and was appointed Knight of the Crown of Italy.

Meisl died after suffering a heart attack in 1937.

== See also ==
- National team managers with 100 or more matches
- List of Jews in sports (non-players)
