= Jaime José Rotman =

Argentine footballer and manager

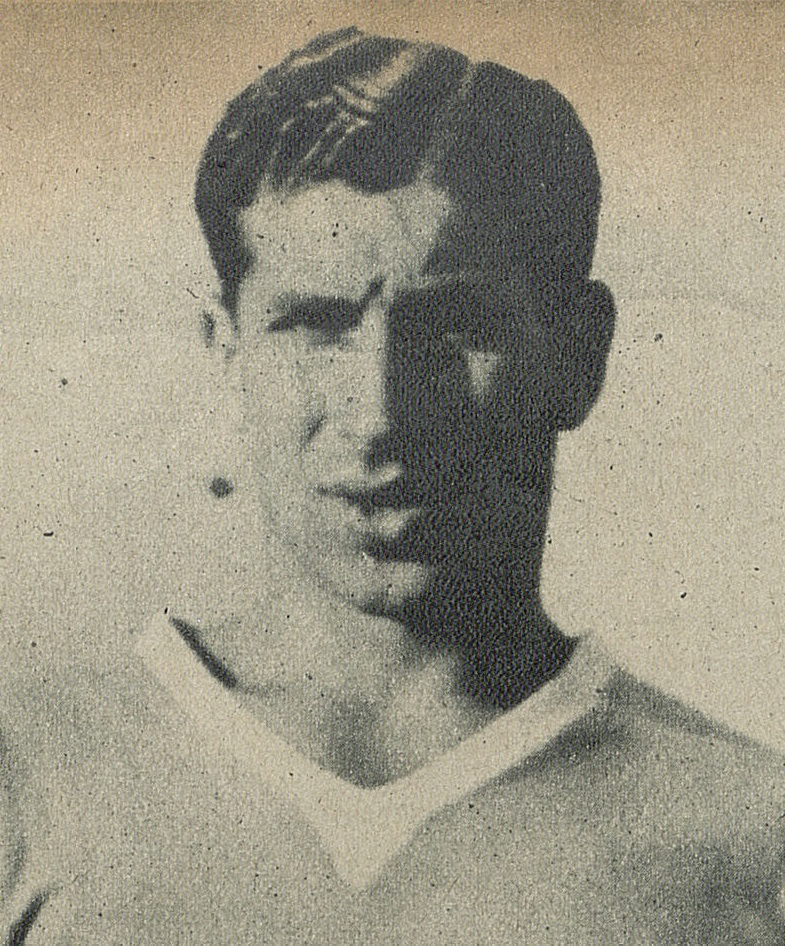
Jaime José Rotman

Jaime José Rotman was an Argentine football goalkeeper. He began his career in 1932 with Argentinos Juniors, where he played until 1935. He then joined Vélez Sársfield.

In 1942 he joined Club Atlético Atlanta, but he returned to Vélez after only one season with Atlanta. He retired from football in 1944 to take up the position of manager at Gimnasia y Esgrima de La Plata.
