= Lajos Fischer =

Hungarian footballer

Personal information
- Full name: Lajos Fischer
- Date of birth: 1 January 1902
- Place of birth: Hungary
- Date of death: 1 January 1978 (aged 76)
- Place of death: Hungary
- Position: Goalkeeper

Youth career
- 1916 – 1919: VAC FC

Senior career*
Years	Team	Apps	(Gls)
1919 – 1926	VAC FC	?	(?)
1926 – 1927	Brooklyn Wanderers	?	(?)
1928 – 1930	Hakoah All-Stars	?	(?)
1930 – 193?	Hakoah Wien	?	(?)

International career^{‡}
1924–1926	Hungary	9	(0)
- * Club domestic league appearances and goals as of 2016–01–17 ‡ National team caps and goals as of 2016–01–17

Lajos Fischer (1 January 1902 – 1 January 1978) was a Hungarian footballer who played for VAC and Hakoah Vienna, and made appearances for the Hungary national team.

== Biography ==
Fischer was born in Hungary, and was Jewish.

In Budapest, he played for Vívó és Atlétikai Club. Fischer played as a goalkeeper for American Soccer League sides Brooklyn Wanderers, New York Giants, and Hakoah All-Stars. He played nine times for the Hungary national football team from 1924 to 1926.

== See also ==
- List of select Jewish football (association; soccer) players
