= Sedlice (Strakonice District) =

- Town
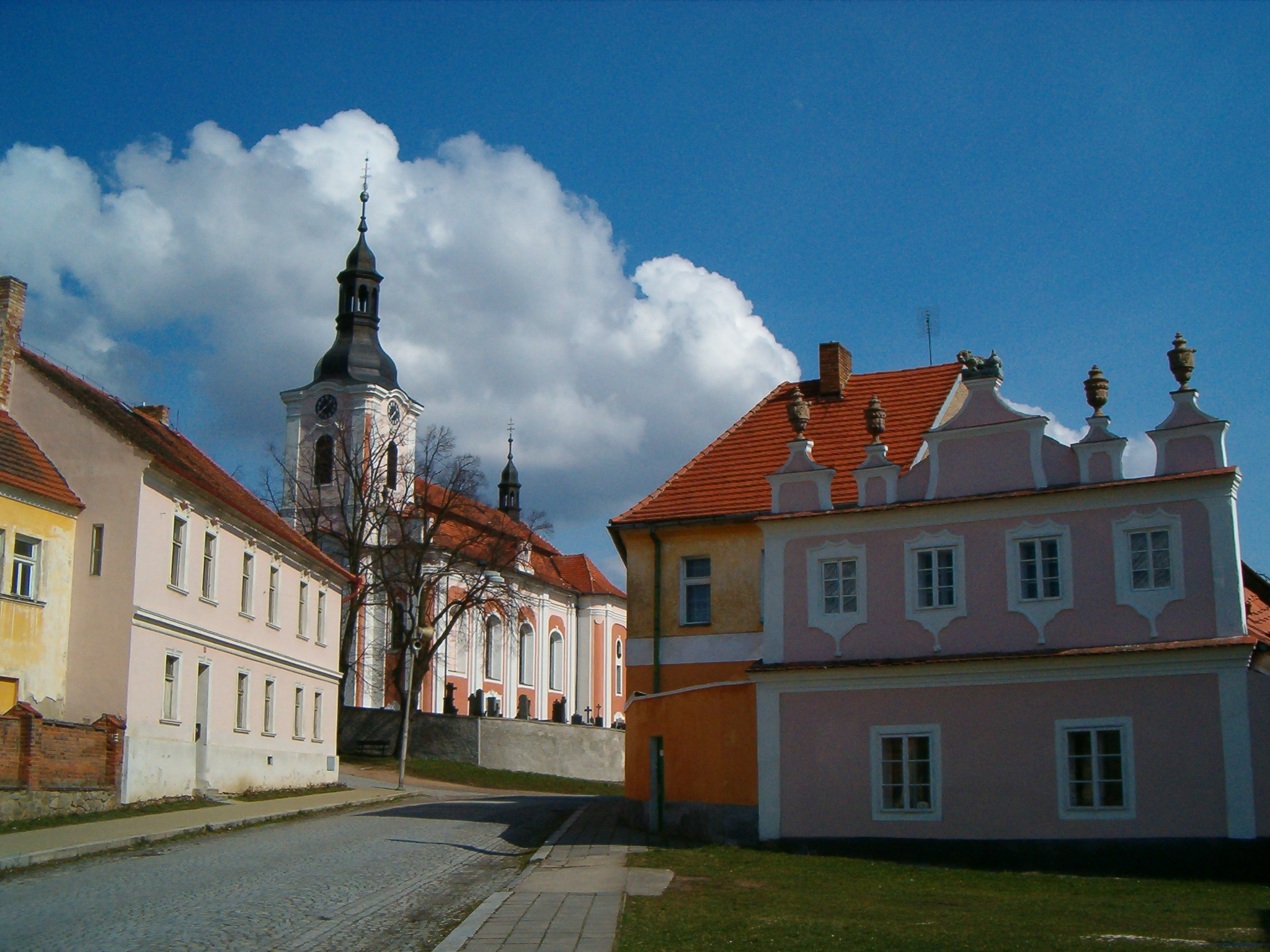
- Church of Saint James the Great

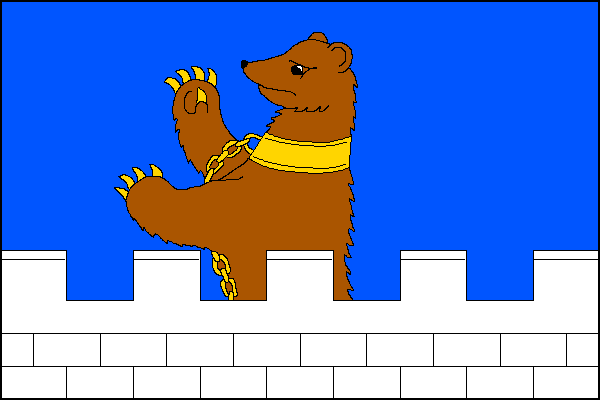
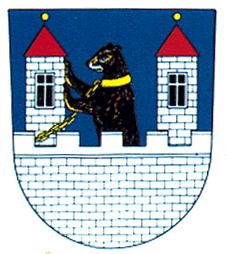
- Flag Coat of arms

- Location in the Czech Republic
- Coordinates: 49°22′38″N 13°56′20″E
- Country: Czech Republic
- Region: South Bohemian
- District: Strakonice
- First mentioned: 1352

Government
  - Mayor: Vladimír Klíma

Area
  - Total: 30.53 km^{2} (11.79 sq mi)
- Elevation: 512 m (1,680 ft)

Population (2026-01-01)
  - Total: 1,258
  - Density: 41.21/km^{2} (106.7/sq mi)
- Time zone: UTC+1 (CET)
  - Summer (DST): UTC+2 (CEST)
- Postal code: 387 32
- Website: www.mestosedlice.cz

Sedlice (Czech pronunciation: [ˈsɛdlɪtsɛ]) is a town in Strakonice District in the South Bohemian Region of the Czech Republic. It has about 1,300 inhabitants. The historic town centre is well preserved and is protected as an urban monument zone.

== Administrative division ==
Sedlice consists of five municipal parts (in brackets population according to the 2021 census):

- Sedlice (1,077)
- Důl (12)
- Holušice (66)
- Mužetice (58)
- Němčice (19)

== Etymology ==
The initial name of the settlement was Sedlec, which is a common toponymy in the Czech Republic. It is derived from the Czech word sedlo, which means 'saddle' in modern Czech, but also 'village' in old West Slavic languages. The form Sedlice first appeared in 1790.

== Geography ==
Sedlice is located about 13 kilometres (8 mi) north of Strakonice and 58 km (36 mi) northwest of České Budějovice. It lies mostly in the southern tip of the Benešov Uplands. The municipal territory also extends into the Blatná Uplands in the southeast and west. The highest point is the hill Mužetický vrch at 573 m (1,880 ft) above sea level. The territory of Sedlice is rich in fishponds.

== History ==
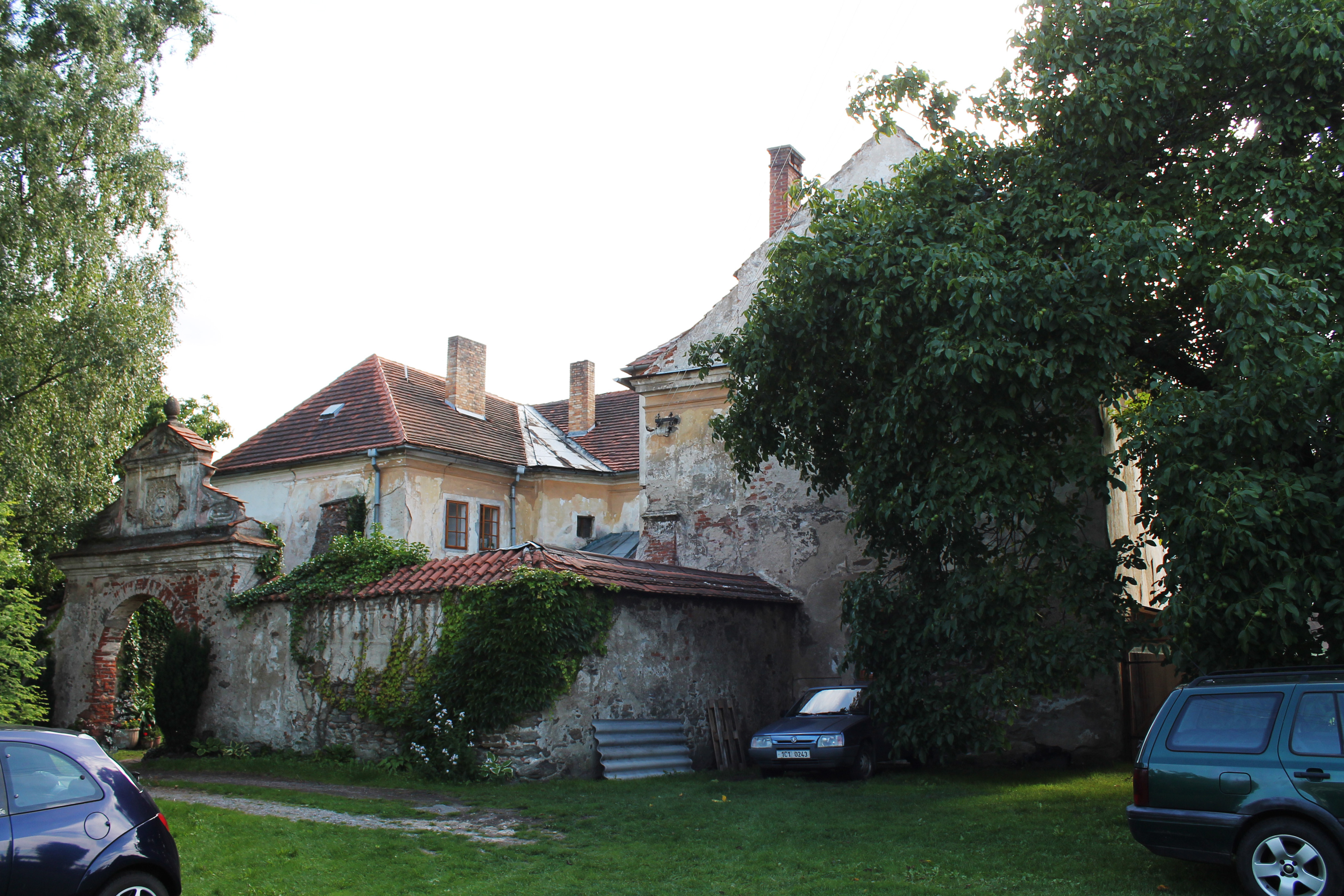
Sedlice Castle

The first written mention of Sedlice is from 1352. From 1352 to 1399, it was a property of Bavors of Strakonice. In the first half of the 15th century, a Gothic fortress was built in the settlement. During the 16th century, Sedlice prospered and developed, and in 1539, the settlement was promoted to a town. In the second half of the 16th century, the fortress was rebuilt to a Renaissance castle with a moat.

== Demographics ==
Historical population

Year	Pop.	±%
1869	2,310	—
1880	2,380	+3.0%
1890	2,298	−3.4%
1900	2,226	−3.1%
1910	2,053	−7.8%

Year	Pop.	±%
1921	2,016	−1.8%
1930	1,847	−8.4%
1950	1,492	−19.2%
1961	1,574	+5.5%
1970	1,442	−8.4%

Year	Pop.	±%
1980	1,373	−4.8%
1991	1,296	−5.6%
2001	1,216	−6.2%
2011	1,287	+5.8%
2021	1,232	−4.3%

Source: Censuses

== Economy ==
The town has a tradition of lace production, which started in the 15th century. It reached its greatest expansion in the 19th and early 20th centuries, and continues to this day.

== Transport ==
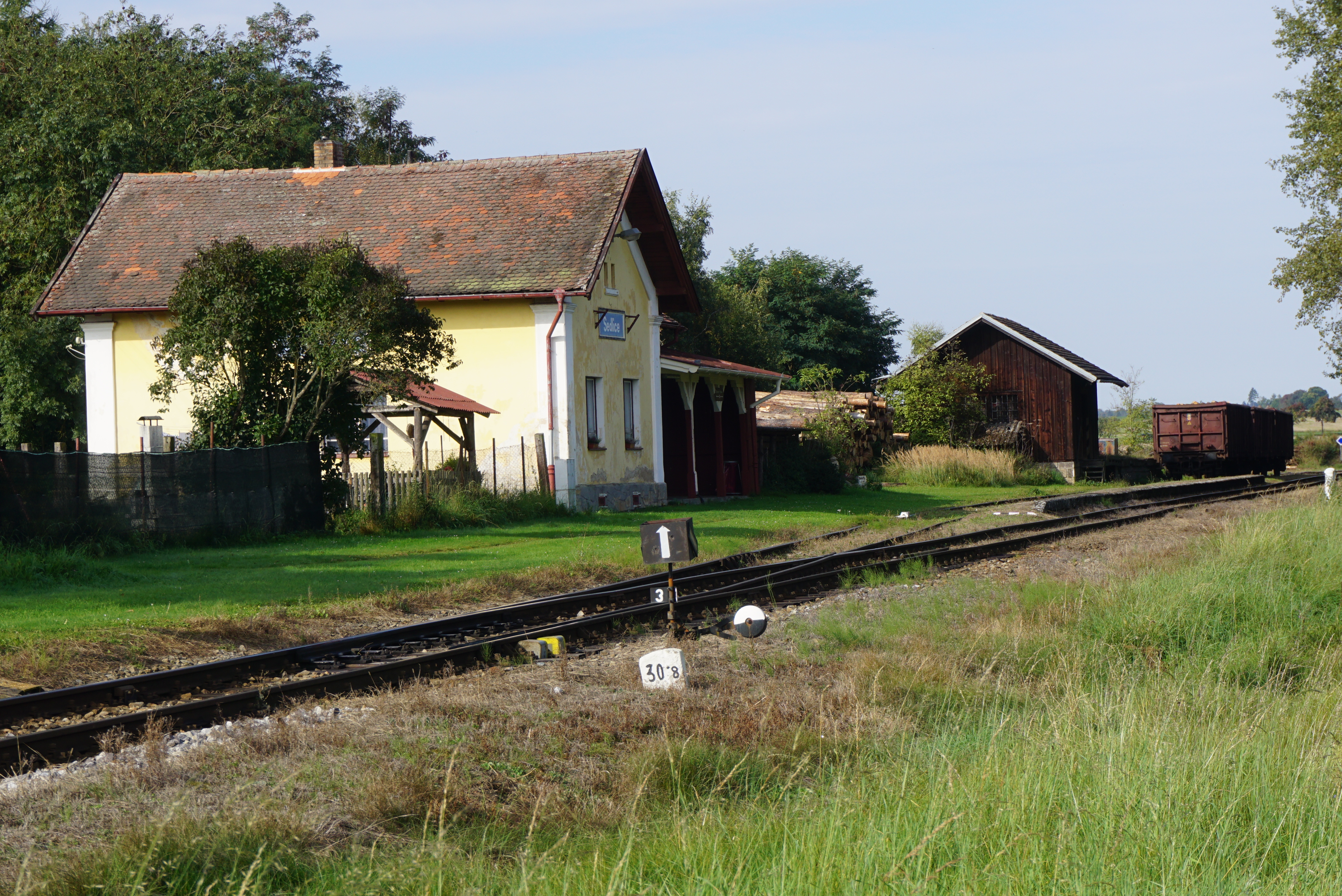
Train station

Sedlice is located on the railway line Strakonice–Blatná.

== Sights ==
The Church of Saint James the Great was built in the Baroque style in 1747–1752, on the site of an old temple from the 14th century.

The castle is one of the main landmarks of the town, but it is dilapidated and inaccessible to the public.
