= List of Colombia national football team World Cup and Copa América squads =

The FIFA World Cup and Copa América, are the primary competitive tournaments the Colombia national football team enters. Excluding the tournament years in which Colombia either did not enter or failed to qualify for the finals, the Colombia national team has nominated the following squads of players to compete in the finals:

== FIFA World Cup ==
=== 1962 FIFA World Cup ===
Head coach: (Argentina) Adolfo Pedernera

No.	Pos.	Player	Date of birth (age)	Caps	Club
1	GK	Efraín Sánchez	27 February 1926 (aged 36)	27	(Colombia) Independiente Medellín
2	GK	Achito Vivas	1 March 1934 (aged 28)	0	(Colombia) Deportivo Pereira
3	DF	Francisco Zuluaga (captain)	4 February 1929 (aged 33)	9	(Colombia) Independiente Santa Fe
4	DF	Aníbal Alzate	31 January 1933 (aged 29)	4	(Colombia) Deportes Tolima
5	DF	Jaime González	1 April 1938 (aged 24)	2	(Colombia) América de Cali
6	DF	Ignacio Calle	21 August 1931 (aged 30)	8	(Colombia) Atlético Nacional
7	DF	Carlos Aponte	24 January 1939 (aged 23)	1	(Colombia) Independiente Santa Fe
8	DF	Héctor Echeverry	10 April 1938 (aged 24)	5	(Colombia) Independiente Medellín
9	MF	Jaime Silva	10 October 1935 (aged 26)	12	(Colombia) Independiente Santa Fe
10	MF	Rolando Serrano	13 November 1938 (aged 23)	5	(Colombia) América de Cali
11	DF	Óscar López	2 April 1939 (aged 23)	4	(Colombia) Once Caldas
12	MF	Hernando Tovar	7 June 1938 (aged 23)	0	(Colombia) Independiente Santa Fe
13	FW	Germán Aceros	30 September 1938 (aged 23)	6	(Colombia) Deportivo Cali
14	FW	Luis Paz	25 June 1942 (aged 19)	0	(Colombia) América de Cali
15	MF	Marcos Coll	23 August 1935 (aged 26)	4	(Colombia) América de Cali
16	FW	Ignacio Pérez	19 December 1934 (aged 27)	4	(Colombia) Once Caldas
17	FW	Marino Klinger	7 February 1936 (aged 26)	3	(Colombia) Millonarios
18	FW	Eusebio Escobar	2 July 1936 (aged 25)	2	(Colombia) Deportivo Pereira
19	FW	Delio Gamboa	28 January 1936 (aged 26)	9	(Colombia) Millonarios
20	FW	Antonio Rada	13 June 1937 (aged 24)	2	(Colombia) Deportivo Pereira
21	FW	Héctor González	7 July 1937 (aged 24)	3	(Colombia) Independiente Santa Fe
22	FW	Jairo Arias	2 November 1938 (aged 23)	4	(Colombia) Atlético Nacional

=== 1990 FIFA World Cup ===
Head coach: Francisco Maturana

No.	Pos.	Player	Date of birth (age)	Caps	Club
1	GK	René Higuita	27 August 1966 (aged 23)	33	(Colombia) Atlético Nacional
2	DF	Andrés Escobar	13 March 1967 (aged 23)	4	(Switzerland) Young Boys
3	DF	Gildardo Gómez	13 October 1963 (aged 26)	0	(Colombia) Atlético Nacional
4	DF	Luis Herrera	12 June 1962 (aged 27)	4	(Colombia) Atlético Nacional
5	MF	León Villa	12 January 1960 (aged 30)	1	(Colombia) Atlético Nacional
6	DF	José Ricardo Pérez	24 October 1963 (aged 26)	2	(Colombia) Atlético Nacional
7	FW	Carlos Estrada	1 November 1961 (aged 28)	0	(Colombia) Millonarios
8	MF	Gabriel Gómez	8 December 1959 (aged 30)	5	(Colombia) Independiente Medellín
9	FW	Miguel Guerrero	7 September 1967 (aged 22)	0	(Colombia) América de Cali
10	MF	Carlos Valderrama (captain)	2 September 1961 (aged 28)	26	(France) Montpellier
11	MF	Bernardo Redín	26 February 1963 (aged 27)	8	(Colombia) Deportivo Cali
12	GK	Eduardo Niño	8 August 1967 (aged 22)	0	(Colombia) Independiente Santa Fe
13	DF	Carlos Hoyos	28 February 1962 (aged 28)	24	(Colombia) Atlético Junior
14	MF	Leonel Álvarez	29 July 1965 (aged 24)	35	(Colombia) Atlético Nacional
15	DF	Luis Carlos Perea	29 December 1963 (aged 26)	33	(Colombia) Atlético Nacional
16	FW	Arnoldo Iguarán	18 January 1957 (aged 33)	58	(Colombia) Millonarios
17	DF	Geovanis Cassiani	10 January 1970 (aged 20)	0	(Colombia) Atlético Nacional
18	DF	Wílmer Cabrera	15 September 1967 (aged 22)	4	(Colombia) América de Cali
19	MF	Freddy Rincón	14 August 1966 (aged 23)	9	(Colombia) América de Cali
20	MF	Luis Fajardo	18 August 1963 (aged 26)	0	(Colombia) Atlético Nacional
21	DF	Alexis Mendoza	8 November 1961 (aged 28)	1	(Colombia) Atlético Junior
22	FW	Rubén Darío Hernández	19 February 1965 (aged 25)	1	(Colombia) Millonarios

=== 1994 FIFA World Cup ===
Head coach: Francisco Maturana

No.	Pos.	Player	Date of birth (age)	Caps	Club
1	GK	Óscar Córdoba	3 February 1970 (aged 24)	26	(Colombia) América de Cali
2	DF	Andrés Escobar	13 March 1967 (aged 27)	48	(Colombia) Atlético Nacional
3	DF	Alexis Mendoza	8 November 1961 (aged 32)	37	(Colombia) Atlético Junior
4	DF	Luis Herrera	12 June 1962 (aged 32)	56	(Colombia) Atlético Nacional
5	MF	Hermán Gaviria	27 November 1969 (aged 24)	5	(Colombia) Atlético Nacional
6	MF	Gabriel Gómez	8 December 1959 (aged 34)	44	(Colombia) Atlético Nacional
7	FW	Antony de Ávila	21 December 1962 (aged 31)	23	(Colombia) América de Cali
8	MF	Harold Lozano	30 March 1972 (aged 22)	6	(Colombia) América de Cali
9	FW	Iván Valenciano	18 March 1972 (aged 22)	9	(Colombia) Atlético Junior
10	MF	Carlos Valderrama (captain)	2 September 1961 (aged 32)	65	(Colombia) Atlético Junior
11	FW	Adolfo Valencia	6 February 1968 (aged 26)	14	(Germany) Bayern Munich
12	GK	Faryd Mondragón	21 June 1971 (aged 22)	1	(Argentina) Argentinos Juniors
13	DF	Néstor Ortiz	20 September 1968 (aged 25)	3	(Colombia) Once Caldas
14	MF	Leonel Álvarez	29 July 1965 (aged 28)	71	(Colombia) América de Cali
15	DF	Luis Carlos Perea	29 December 1963 (aged 30)	75	(Colombia) Atlético Junior
16	FW	Víctor Aristizábal	9 December 1971 (aged 22)	12	(Spain) Valencia
17	MF	Mauricio Serna	22 January 1968 (aged 26)	7	(Colombia) Atlético Nacional
18	DF	Óscar Cortés	19 October 1968 (aged 25)	1	(Colombia) Millonarios
19	MF	Freddy Rincón	14 August 1966 (aged 27)	39	(Brazil) Palmeiras
20	DF	Wilson Pérez	6 August 1967 (aged 26)	43	(Colombia) América de Cali
21	FW	Faustino Asprilla	10 November 1969 (aged 24)	8	(Italy) Parma
22	GK	José María Pazo	4 April 1964 (aged 30)	2	(Colombia) Atlético Junior

=== 1998 FIFA World Cup ===
Head coach: Hernán Darío Gómez

No.	Pos.	Player	Date of birth (age)	Caps	Club
1	GK	Óscar Córdoba	3 February 1970 (aged 28)	38	(Argentina) Boca Juniors
2	DF	Iván Córdoba	11 August 1976 (aged 21)	14	(Argentina) San Lorenzo
3	DF	Ever Palacios	18 January 1969 (aged 29)	1	(Colombia) Deportivo Cali
4	DF	José Santa	12 November 1970 (aged 27)	26	(Colombia) Atlético Nacional
5	DF	Jorge Bermúdez	18 June 1971 (aged 26)	15	(Argentina) Boca Juniors
6	MF	Mauricio Serna	22 January 1968 (aged 30)	2	(Argentina) Boca Juniors
7	FW	Antony de Ávila	21 December 1962 (aged 35)	52	(Ecuador) Barcelona
8	MF	John Harold Lozano	30 March 1972 (aged 26)	13	(Spain) Valladolid
9	FW	Adolfo Valencia	6 February 1968 (aged 30)	34	(Colombia) Independiente Medellín
10	MF	Carlos Valderrama (captain)	2 September 1961 (aged 36)	108	(United States) Miami Fusion
11	FW	Faustino Asprilla	10 November 1969 (aged 28)	44	(Italy) Parma
12	GK	Miguel Calero	14 April 1971 (aged 27)	5	(Colombia) Atlético Nacional
13	DF	Wílmer Cabrera	15 September 1967 (aged 30)	45	(Colombia) Millonarios
14	MF	Jorge Bolaño	28 April 1977 (aged 21)	0	(Colombia) Atlético Junior
15	FW	Víctor Aristizábal	9 December 1971 (aged 26)	18	(Brazil) São Paulo
16	DF	Luis Antonio Moreno	25 December 1970 (aged 27)	19	(Colombia) Deportes Tolima
17	MF	Andrés Estrada	12 November 1967 (aged 30)	2	(Colombia) Deportivo Cali
18	MF	John Wilmar Pérez	2 February 1970 (aged 28)	5	(Colombia) Deportivo Cali
19	MF	Freddy Rincón	14 August 1966 (aged 31)	75	(Brazil) Corinthians
20	FW	Hámilton Ricard	12 January 1974 (aged 24)	5	(England) Middlesbrough
21	FW	Léider Preciado	26 February 1977 (aged 21)	0	(Colombia) Santa Fe
22	GK	Faryd Mondragón	21 June 1971 (aged 26)	5	(Argentina) Independiente

=== 2014 FIFA World Cup ===
Head coach: (Argentina) José Pékerman The final squad was announced on 2 June 2014. However, midfielder Aldo Leão Ramírez sustained injury afterwards and was replaced by Carlos Carbonero.

No.	Pos.	Player	Date of birth (age)	Caps	Club
1	GK	David Ospina	31 August 1988 (aged 25)	44	(France) Nice
2	DF	Cristián Zapata	30 September 1986 (aged 27)	24	(Italy) Milan
3	DF	Mario Yepes (captain)	13 January 1976 (aged 38)	98	(Italy) Atalanta
4	DF	Santiago Arias	13 January 1992 (aged 22)	6	(Netherlands) PSV Eindhoven
5	MF	Carlos Carbonero	25 July 1990 (aged 23)	1	(Argentina) River Plate
6	MF	Carlos Sánchez	6 February 1986 (aged 28)	44	(Spain) Elche
7	DF	Pablo Armero	2 November 1986 (aged 27)	53	(England) West Ham United
8	MF	Abel Aguilar	6 January 1985 (aged 29)	49	(France) Toulouse
9	FW	Teófilo Gutiérrez	17 May 1985 (aged 29)	30	(Argentina) River Plate
10	MF	James Rodríguez	12 July 1991 (aged 22)	22	(France) Monaco
11	MF	Juan Cuadrado	26 May 1988 (aged 26)	28	(Italy) Fiorentina
12	GK	Camilo Vargas	9 March 1989 (aged 25)	0	(Colombia) Santa Fe
13	MF	Fredy Guarín	30 June 1986 (aged 27)	49	(Italy) Inter Milan
14	FW	Víctor Ibarbo	19 May 1990 (aged 24)	9	(Italy) Cagliari
15	MF	Alexander Mejía	11 July 1988 (aged 25)	8	(Colombia) Atlético Nacional
16	DF	Éder Álvarez Balanta	28 February 1993 (aged 21)	3	(Argentina) River Plate
17	FW	Carlos Bacca	8 September 1986 (aged 27)	11	(Spain) Sevilla
18	DF	Juan Camilo Zúñiga	14 December 1985 (aged 28)	50	(Italy) Napoli
19	FW	Adrián Ramos	22 January 1986 (aged 28)	26	(Germany) Hertha BSC
20	MF	Juan Fernando Quintero	18 January 1993 (aged 21)	4	(Portugal) Porto
21	FW	Jackson Martínez	3 October 1986 (aged 27)	27	(Portugal) Porto
22	GK	Faryd Mondragón	21 June 1971 (aged 42)	50	(Colombia) Deportivo Cali
23	DF	Carlos Valdés	22 May 1985 (aged 29)	14	(Argentina) San Lorenzo

=== 2018 FIFA World Cup ===
Head coach: (Argentina) José Pékerman

No.	Pos.	Player	Date of birth (age)	Caps	Goals	Club
1	GK	David Ospina	31 August 1988 (aged 29)	86	0	(The Football Association) Arsenal
2	DF	Cristián Zapata	30 September 1986 (aged 31)	55	2	(Italian Football Federation) Milan
3	DF	Óscar Murillo	18 April 1988 (aged 30)	13	0	(Mexican Football Federation) Pachuca
4	DF	Santiago Arias	13 January 1992 (aged 26)	41	0	(Royal Dutch Football Association) PSV Eindhoven
5	MF	Wilmar Barrios	16 October 1993 (aged 24)	10	0	(Argentine Football Association) Boca Juniors
6	MF	Carlos Sánchez	6 February 1986 (aged 32)	85	0	(Royal Spanish Football Federation) Espanyol
7	FW	Carlos Bacca	8 September 1986 (aged 31)	45	14	(Royal Spanish Football Federation) Villarreal
8	MF	Abel Aguilar	6 January 1985 (aged 33)	70	7	(Colombian Football Federation) Deportivo Cali
9	FW	Radamel Falcao (captain)	10 February 1986 (aged 32)	73	29	(French Football Federation) Monaco
10	MF	James Rodríguez	12 July 1991 (aged 26)	63	21	(German Football Association) Bayern Munich
11	MF	Juan Cuadrado	26 May 1988 (aged 30)	70	7	(Italian Football Federation) Juventus
12	GK	Camilo Vargas	9 March 1989 (aged 29)	5	0	(Colombian Football Federation) Deportivo Cali
13	DF	Yerry Mina	23 September 1994 (aged 23)	12	3	(Royal Spanish Football Federation) Barcelona
14	FW	Luis Muriel	16 April 1991 (aged 27)	18	2	(Royal Spanish Football Federation) Sevilla
15	MF	Mateus Uribe	21 March 1991 (aged 27)	8	0	(Mexican Football Federation) América
16	MF	Jefferson Lerma	25 October 1994 (aged 23)	5	0	(Royal Spanish Football Federation) Levante
17	DF	Johan Mojica	21 August 1992 (aged 25)	4	1	(Royal Spanish Football Federation) Girona
18	DF	Farid Díaz	20 July 1983 (aged 34)	13	0	(Paraguayan Football Association) Olimpia
19	FW	Miguel Borja	26 January 1993 (aged 25)	7	2	(Brazilian Football Confederation) Palmeiras
20	MF	Juan Fernando Quintero	18 January 1993 (aged 25)	15	2	(Argentine Football Association) River Plate
21	FW	José Izquierdo	7 July 1992 (aged 25)	5	1	(The Football Association) Brighton & Hove Albion
22	GK	José Fernando Cuadrado	1 June 1985 (aged 33)	1	0	(Colombian Football Federation) Once Caldas
23	DF	Davinson Sánchez	12 June 1996 (aged 22)	9	0	(The Football Association) Tottenham Hotspur

== South American Championship ==
=== 1945 South American Championship ===
Head coach: Roberto Meléndez (also participated as footballer)

No.	Pos.	Player	Date of birth (age)	Caps	Goals	Club
—	GK	Andrés Acosta		0	0	(Colombian Football Federation) Junior
—	DF	Pedro Ricardo López	1912 (aged 33)	3	0	(Colombian Football Federation) Junior
—	DF	Lucas Martínez		0	0	(Colombian Football Federation) Junior
—	DF	Gabriel Mejía		0	0	(Colombian Football Federation) Junior
—	DF	Humberto Picalúa		1	0	(Colombian Football Federation) Junior
—	MF	Antonio de la Hoz	1920 (aged 25)	0	0	(Colombian Football Federation) Sporting de Barranquilla
—	MF	Isidro Joliani		1	0	(Colombian Football Federation) Junior
—	MF	Juan A. Quintero		0	0	(Colombian Football Federation) Junior
—	FW	Fulgencio Berdugo	14 June 1918 (aged 26)	0	0	(Colombian Football Federation) Junior
—	FW	Lancáster de León		0	0	(Colombian Football Federation) Junior
—	FW	Roberto Gámez		0	0	(Colombian Football Federation) Junior
—	FW	Rafael Granados		0	0	(Colombian Football Federation) Junior
—	FW	Luis González Rubio		0	0	(Colombian Football Federation) Junior
—	FW	Marcos Mejía		2	2	(Colombian Football Federation) Junior
—	FW	Roberto Meléndez	31 March 1912 (aged 32)	1	0	(Colombian Football Federation) Junior
—	FW	Arturo Mendoza		0	0	(Colombian Football Federation) Junior
—	FW	Carlos Recio		0	0	(Colombian Football Federation) Junior
—	FW	José de Jesús Zapata	3 September 1916 (aged 28)	2	0	(Colombian Football Federation) Junior
—		Humberto Arbeláez		0	0	(Colombian Football Federation) Junior
—		Juan Navarro		0	0	(Colombian Football Federation) Junior

=== 1949 South American Championship ===
Head coach: (Austria) Friedrich Donnenfeld

No.	Pos.	Player	Date of birth (age)	Caps	Goals	Club
—	GK	Dagoberto Ojeda		0	0	(Colombian Football Federation) Junior
—	GK	Efraín Sánchez	26 February 1926 (aged 23)	7	0	(Argentine Football Association) San Lorenzo
—	DF	Mario Marriaga		0	0	(Colombian Football Federation) Junior
—	DF	Gabriel Mejía		14	0	(Colombian Football Federation) Junior
—	DF	Humberto Picalúa		12	0	(Colombian Football Federation) Junior
—	MF	Luz Gastelbondo		2	0	(Colombian Football Federation) Junior
—	MF	Casimiro Guerra		3	0	(Colombian Football Federation) Junior
—	MF	Emiliano Gutiérrez		0	0	(Colombian Football Federation) Junior
—	MF	Guillermo Muñoz		0	0	(Colombian Football Federation) Junior
—	FW	Fulgencio Berdugo	14 June 1918 (aged 30)	8	3	(Colombian Football Federation) Junior
—	FW	Octavio Carrillo		6	0	(Colombian Football Federation) Junior
—	FW	Lancáster de León		3	0	(Colombian Football Federation) Junior
—	FW	Rigoberto García		8	2	(Colombian Football Federation) Junior
—	FW	Luis González Rubio		13	6	(Colombian Football Federation) Junior
—	FW	Alfonso Pedraza		0	0	(Colombian Football Federation) Junior
—	FW	Alfredo Pérez		0	0	(Colombian Football Federation) Junior
—	FW	Apolinar Pérez		3	0	(Colombian Football Federation) Junior
—	FW	Nelson Pérez		0	0	(Colombian Football Federation) Junior
—	FW	Octavio Ruiz		4	0	(Colombian Football Federation) Junior
—	FW	Arturo Ucrós		0	0	(Colombian Football Federation) Junior

=== 1957 South American Championship ===
Head coach: Pedro López

No.	Pos.	Player	Date of birth (age)	Caps	Club
—	GK	Ingerman Benítez			(Colombia) América
—	GK	Efraín Sánchez	26 February 1926 (aged 31)		(Colombia) Independiente Medellín
—	DF	Faustino Abadía			(Colombia) América
—	DF	Ricardo Díaz	7 August 1932 (aged 24)		(Colombia) Atlético Quindío
—	DF	Rodolfo Escobar			(Colombia) América
—	DF	Francisco Zuluaga	25 March 1939 (aged 17)		(Colombia) Millonarios
—	MF	Humberto Álvarez			(Colombia) Atlético Nacional
—	MF	Luis Alberto Rubio	28 February 1929 (aged 28)		(Colombia) Millonarios
—	MF	Israel Sánchez			(Colombia) América
—	MF	Jaime Silva	10 October 1935 (aged 21)		(Colombia) Santa Fe
—	MF	Rogelio Sinisterra			(Colombia) Deportivo Pereira
—	MF	Roaldo Viáfara	23 May 1926 (aged 30)		(Colombia) América
—	FW	Julio Andrade			(Colombia) Cúcuta Deportivo
—	FW	Julio Aragón			(Colombia) América
—	FW	Carlos Arango	31 January 1928 (aged 29)		(Colombia) Santa Fe
—	FW	Alejandro Carrillo	22 February 1931 (aged 26)		(Colombia) Atlético Quindío
—	FW	Delio Gamboa	28 January 1936 (aged 21)		(Colombia) Atlético Nacional
—	FW	Jaime Gutiérrez	28 February 1930 (aged 27)		(Colombia) Independiente Medellín
—	FW	Guillermo Mendoza			(Colombia) América
—	FW	Lauro Mosquera			(Spain) Barcelona
—	FW	Luis Alberto Valencia			(Colombia) Deportivo Manizales

=== 1963 South American Championship ===
Head coach: Gabriel Ochoa Uribe

No.	Pos.	Player	Date of birth (age)	Caps	Goals	Club
—	GK	Senén Mosquera		0	0	(Colombian Football Federation) Millonarios
—	GK	Adelmo Vivas	1 March 1934 (aged 29)	0	0	(Colombian Football Federation) Deportivo Pereira
—	DF	Aníbal Alzate	31 January 1933 (aged 30)	6	0	(Colombian Football Federation) Deportes Tolima
—	DF	Carlos Aponte	24 January 1939 (aged 24)	1	0	(Colombian Football Federation) Independiente Santa Fe
—	DF	Jaime Gonzalez	1 April 1938 (aged 24)	5	0	(Colombian Football Federation) América de Cali
—	DF	Óscar López	2 April 1939 (aged 23)	7	0	(Colombian Football Federation) Once Caldas
—	DF	Orlando Marín	23 September 1942 (aged 20)	0	0	(Colombian Football Federation) Once Caldas
—	DF	Joaquín Sánchez		0	0	(Colombian Football Federation) Deportivo Cali
—	MF	Conrado Arango		0	0	(Colombian Football Federation) Millonarios
—	MF	Marcos Coll	23 August 1935 (aged 27)	7	1	(Colombian Football Federation) América de Cali
—	MF	Gonzalo González		0	0	(Colombian Football Federation) Independiente Santa Fe
—	MF	Rolando Serrano	13 November 1938 (aged 24)	7	0	(Colombian Football Federation) América de Cali
—	MF	Jaime Silva	10 October 1935 (aged 27)	13	0	(Colombian Football Federation) Independiente Santa Fe
—	FW	Germán Aceros	30 September 1938 (aged 24)	9	1	(Colombian Football Federation) Deportivo Cali
—	FW	Carlos Arango	31 January 1928 (aged 35)	18	6	(Colombian Football Federation) Millonarios
—	FW	Jairo Arias	2 November 1938 (aged 24)	5	1	(Colombian Football Federation) Once Caldas
—	FW	Alonso Botero		0	0	(Colombian Football Federation) Once Caldas
—	FW	Carlos Campillo		0	0	(Colombian Football Federation) Millonarios
—	FW	Delio Gamboa	28 January 1936 (aged 27)	15	3	(Colombian Football Federation) Millonarios
—	FW	Francisco González	18 May 1936 (aged 26)	0	0	(Colombian Football Federation) Independiente Medellín
—	FW	Héctor González	7 July 1937 (aged 25)	5	1	(Colombian Football Federation) Independiente Santa Fe
—	FW	Saúl Salla		0	0	(Colombian Football Federation) Deportivo Cali

== Copa América ==
=== 1975 Copa América ===
Head coach: Efraín Sánchez

No.	Pos.	Player	Date of birth (age)	Caps	Club
	GK	Jaime Deluque			(Colombia) Junior
	GK	Pedro Zape	3 June 1949 (aged 26)		(Colombia) Deportivo Cali
	DF	Edgar Angulo	2 March 1953 (aged 22)		(Colombia) Atlético Nacional
	DF	Miguel Escobar			(Colombia) Deportivo Cali
	DF	Euclides González			(Colombia) Millonarios
	DF	Alonso López			(Colombia) Millonarios
	DF	Henry Caicedo	18 July 1951 (aged 24)		(Colombia) Deportivo Cali
	DF	Arturo Segovia			(Colombia) Millonarios
	DF	Luis Soto			(Colombia) Millonarios
	MF	Oswaldo Calero			(Colombia) Deportivo Cali
	MF	Willington Ortiz	26 March 1952 (aged 23)		(Colombia) Millonarios
	MF	Ponciano Castro	28 January 1953 (aged 22)		(Colombia) Independiente Medellín
	MF	Jairo Arboleda	20 September 1947 (aged 27)		(Colombia) Deportivo Cali
	MF	Óscar Bolaño	14 May 1951 (aged 24)		(Colombia) Independiente Santa Fe
	MF	Jesús Rubio			(Colombia) Millonarios
	MF	Diego Umaña	12 March 1951 (aged 24)		(Colombia) Deportivo Cali
	MF	José Zárate			(Colombia) Junior
	MF	Carlos Rendón			(Colombia) Millonarios
	FW	Nelson Silva Pacheco	8 October 1944 (aged 30)		(Colombia) Junior
	FW	Eduardo Retat	16 June 1948 (aged 27)		(Colombia) Atlético Nacional
	FW	Víctor Campaz	21 May 1949 (aged 26)		(Colombia) Atlético Nacional
	FW	Ernesto Díaz	13 September 1952 (aged 22)		(Colombia) Independiente Santa Fe
	FW	Hugo Lóndero	18 September 1946 (aged 28)		(Colombia) Atlético Nacional

=== 1979 Copa América ===
Head Coach: (Socialist Federal Republic of Yugoslavia) Blagoje Vidinić

No.	Pos.	Player	Date of birth (age)	Caps	Club
	GK	James Mina	17 July 1954 (aged 24)		(Colombia) Independiente Santa Fe
	GK	Heberth Ríos	28 September 1956 (aged 22)		(Colombia) Once Caldas
	GK	Pedro Zape	3 June 1949 (aged 30)		(Colombia) Deportivo Cali
	DF	Oscar Bolaño	14 April 1951 (aged 28)		(Colombia) Atlético Junior
	DF	Fernando Castro	11 February 1949 (aged 30)		(Colombia) Deportivo Cali
	DF	Miguel Escobar	18 April 1945 (aged 34)		(Colombia) Deportivo Cali
	DF	Miguel Prince	30 July 1957 (aged 21)		(Colombia) Atlético Bucaramanga
	DF	Luis Eduardo Reyes	27 January 1954 (aged 25)		(Colombia) América de Cali
	MF	José Chaparro	2 July 1954 (aged 25)		(Colombia) América de Cali
	MF	Hernán Herrera	28 October 1957 (aged 21)		(Colombia) Atlético Nacional
	DF	Luis Fernando López			(Colombia) Independiente Santa Fe
	MF	Víctor Lugo	15 April 1954 (aged 25)		(Colombia) América de Cali
	MF	Álvaro Muñoz Castro	17 May 1954 (aged 25)		(Colombia) América de Cali
	MF	Rafael Otero	14 December 1954 (aged 24)		(Colombia) Deportivo Cali
	MF	César Valverde	23 August 1951 (aged 27)		(Colombia) Deportivo Cali
	FW	Rafael Agudelo	30 October 1960 (aged 18)		(Colombia) Deportivo Cali
	FW	Ernesto Díaz	13 September 1952 (aged 26)		(Colombia) Atlético Junior
	FW	Arnoldo Iguarán	18 January 1957 (aged 22)		(Colombia) Cúcuta Deportivo
	FW	Jaime Morón	16 November 1950 (aged 28)		(Colombia) Millonarios
	MF	Willington Ortiz	26 March 1952 (aged 27)		(Colombia) Millonarios
	FW	Alex Valderrama	1 October 1960 (aged 18)		(Colombia) Unión Magdalena
	FW	Eduardo Vilarete	20 June 1953 (aged 26)		(Colombia) Atlético Nacional

=== 1983 Copa América ===
Head coach: Efraín Sánchez

No.	Pos.	Player	Date of birth (age)	Caps	Club
	GK	James Mina	17 July 1954 (aged 29)		(Colombia) Independiente Santa Fe
	GK	Pedro Zape	3 June 1949 (aged 34)		(Colombia) Deportivo Cali
	DF	Pedro Blanco	28 June 1958 (aged 25)		(Colombia) Atlético Junior
	DF	Oscar Bolaño	14 April 1951 (aged 32)		(Colombia) Atlético Junior
	DF	Álvaro Escobar	16 May 1955 (aged 28)		(Colombia) Independiente Medellín
	DF	Carlos Hoyos	28 April 1962 (aged 21)		(Colombia) Deportivo Cali
	DF	Nolberto Molina	5 January 1953 (aged 30)		(Colombia) Millonarios
	DF	Víctor Luna	27 October 1959 (aged 23)		(Colombia) Atletico Nacional
	DF	Miguel Prince	30 July 1957 (aged 26)		(Colombia) Millonarios
	MF	Henry Viáfara	20 April 1953 (aged 30)		(Colombia) América de Cali
	MF	Juan Caicedo	8 March 1955 (aged 28)		(Colombia) América de Cali
	MF	Ernesto Díaz	13 December 1952 (aged 30)		(Colombia) Millonarios
	MF	Hernán Darío Herrera	28 October 1957 (aged 25)		(Colombia) América de Cali
	MF	Willington Ortiz	26 March 1952 (aged 31)		(Colombia) Millonarios
	MF	Norberto Peluffo	26 June 1958 (aged 25)		(Colombia) Atlético Nacional
	MF	Pedro Sarmiento	26 October 1956 (aged 26)		(Colombia) Atlético Nacional
	FW	Antony de Ávila	30 December 1963 (aged 19)		(Colombia) América de Cali
	FW	Jesús Barrios	10 January 1961 (aged 22)		(Colombia) Atlético Junior
	FW	Fernando Fiorillo	23 November 1956 (aged 26)		(Colombia) Atlético Junior
	FW	Arnoldo Iguarán	18 January 1957 (aged 26)		(Colombia) Millonarios
	FW	Alex Valderrama	1 October 1960 (aged 22)		(Colombia) Unión Magdalena

=== 1987 Copa América ===
Head coach: Francisco Maturana

No.	Pos.	Player	Date of birth (age)	Caps	Club
1	GK	René Higuita	26 August 1966 (aged 20)		(Colombia) Atlético Nacional
2	DF	Luis Carlos Perea	29 December 1963 (aged 23)		(Colombia) Atlético Nacional
3	DF	Nolberto Molina	5 January 1953 (aged 34)		(Colombia) Atlético Nacional
4	DF	Luis Fernando Herrera	12 February 1962 (aged 25)		(Colombia) Atlético Nacional
5	DF	Carlos Hoyos	28 February 1962 (aged 25)		(Colombia) Deportivo Cali
6	MF	Ricardo Pérez	24 October 1963 (aged 23)		(Colombia) Atlético Nacional
7	FW	Antony de Ávila	21 December 1962 (aged 24)		(Colombia) América de Cali
8	MF	Leonel Álvarez	29 July 1965 (aged 21)		(Colombia) Atlético Nacional
9	FW	Juan Jairo Galeano	12 August 1962 (aged 24)		(Colombia) Atlético Nacional
10	MF	Carlos Valderrama	2 September 1961 (aged 25)		(Colombia) Deportivo Cali
11	MF	Bernardo Redín	23 February 1963 (aged 24)		(Colombia) Deportivo Cali
12	GK	Mario Jiménez	26 May 1959 (aged 28)		(Colombia) Deportes Quindío
13	FW	John Jairo Trellez	29 April 1968 (aged 19)		(Colombia) Atlético Nacional
14	DF	Alexis Mendoza	9 November 1961 (aged 25)		(Colombia) Atlético Junior
15	FW	Sergio Angulo	14 September 1960 (aged 26)		(Colombia) Deportivo Cali
16	DF	Jorge Porras	25 December 1959 (aged 27)		(Colombia) América de Cali
17	MF	Mario Coll	20 August 1960 (aged 26)		(Colombia) Atlético Junior
18	MF	Gabriel Gómez	15 December 1959 (aged 27)		(Colombia) Millonarios
19	FW	Arnoldo Iguarán	16 January 1957 (aged 30)		(Colombia) Millonarios
20	MF	Álex Escobar	8 February 1965 (aged 22)		(Colombia) América de Cali

=== 1989 Copa América ===
Head coach: Francisco Maturana

No.	Pos.	Player	Date of birth (age)	Caps	Club
1	GK	René Higuita	26 August 1966 (aged 22)		(Colombia) Atlético Nacional
2	DF	Andrés Escobar	13 March 1967 (aged 22)		(Colombia) Atlético Nacional
3	DF	Gildardo Gómez	13 October 1963 (aged 25)		(Colombia) Atlético Nacional
4	DF	Wilson Pérez	6 August 1967 (aged 21)		(Colombia) Atlético Junior
5	DF	Carlos Hoyos	28 February 1962 (aged 27)		(Colombia) Atlético Junior
6	MF	Gabriel Gómez	15 December 1959 (aged 29)		(Colombia) Independiente Medellín
7	FW	Antony de Ávila	21 December 1962 (aged 26)		(Colombia) América de Cali
8	MF	Alexis García	27 January 1960 (aged 29)		(Colombia) Atlético Nacional
9	FW	Sergio Angulo	14 September 1960 (aged 28)		(Colombia) América de Cali
10	MF	Carlos Valderrama	2 September 1961 (aged 27)		(France) Montpellier
11	MF	Bernardo Redín	23 February 1963 (aged 26)		(Colombia) Deportivo Cali
12	GK	Eduardo Niño	8 August 1967 (aged 21)		(Colombia) Independiente Santa Fe
13	DF	Alexis Mendoza	9 November 1961 (aged 27)		(Colombia) Atlético Junior
14	MF	Leonel Álvarez	29 July 1965 (aged 23)		(Colombia) Atlético Nacional
15	DF	Luis Carlos Perea	29 December 1963 (aged 25)		(Colombia) Atlético Nacional
16	FW	Arnoldo Iguarán	18 January 1957 (aged 32)		(Colombia) Millonarios
17	FW	John Jairo Trellez	29 April 1968 (aged 21)		(Colombia) Atlético Nacional
18	DF	Wilmer Cabrera	15 September 1967 (aged 21)		(Colombia) Independiente Santa Fe
19	FW	León Villa	12 January 1960 (aged 29)		(Colombia) Atlético Nacional
20	FW	Rubén Darío Hernández	19 February 1965 (aged 24)		(Colombia) Millonarios

=== 1991 Copa América ===
Head coach: Luis Augusto García

No.	Pos.	Player	Date of birth (age)	Caps	Club
1	GK	René Higuita	28 August 1966 (aged 24)	41	(Colombia) Atlético Nacional
2	DF	Andrés Escobar	13 March 1967 (aged 24)	27	(Colombia) Atlético Nacional
3	DF	Gabriel Martínez	3 July 1958 (aged 33)	1	(Colombia) Atlético Junior
4	DF	Eduardo Pimentel	26 May 1959 (aged 32)	3	(Colombia) América Cali
5	DF	Luis Fernando Herrera	12 June 1962 (aged 29)	23	(Colombia) Atlético Nacional
6	MF	Óscar Pareja	10 August 1968 (aged 22)	2	(Colombia) Independiente Medellín
7	FW	Antony de Ávila	21 December 1962 (aged 28)	18	(Colombia) América Cali
8	MF	Alexis García	21 July 1960 (aged 30)		(Colombia) Atlético Nacional
9	FW	Iván Valenciano	18 March 1972 (aged 19)		(Colombia) Atlético Junior
10	MF	Carlos Valderrama	2 September 1961 (aged 29)	32	(France) Montpellier
11	FW	Bernardo Redín	26 February 1963 (aged 28)	37	(Bulgaria) CSKA Sofia
12	GK	Miguel Angel Calero	14 April 1971 (aged 20)		(Colombia) Sporting Barranquilla
13	DF	Wilmer Cabrera	15 September 1967 (aged 23)	6	(Colombia) América Cali
14	MF	Leonel Álvarez	29 July 1965 (aged 25)		(Spain) Real Valladolid
15	DF	Luis Carlos Perea	29 December 1963 (aged 27)	41	(Colombia) Independiente Medellín
16	MF	Carlos Estrada	1 November 1961 (aged 29)	11	(Colombia) Deportivo Cali
17	DF	Diego Osorio	21 July 1970 (aged 20)	1	(Colombia) Atlético Nacional
18	FW	Arnoldo Iguarán	31 January 1957 (aged 34)	63	(Colombia) Millonarios
19	MF	Albeiro Usuriaga	12 June 1966 (aged 25)	10	(Colombia) América Cali
20	MF	Freddy Rincón	14 August 1966 (aged 24)	16	(Colombia) América Cali
21	FW	Augusto Vargas Cortés	26 March 1962 (aged 29)	1	(Colombia) Deportes Quindío
22	GK	Eduardo Niño	8 August 1967 (aged 23)		(Colombia) Atlético Junior

=== 1993 Copa América ===
Head coach: Francisco Maturana

No.	Pos.	Player	Date of birth (age)	Caps	Club
1	GK	Óscar Córdoba	3 February 1970 (aged 23)		(Colombia) Once Caldas
2	DF	Óscar Cortés	19 October 1968 (aged 24)		(Colombia) Millonarios
3	DF	Alexis Mendoza	8 November 1961 (aged 31)		(Colombia) Atlético Junior
4	DF	Luis Fernando Herrera	12 June 1962 (aged 31)		(Colombia) Atlético Nacional
5	MF	Hermán Gaviria	27 November 1969 (aged 23)		(Colombia) Atlético Nacional
6	MF	Gabriel Gómez	8 December 1959 (aged 33)		(Colombia) Atlético Nacional
7	FW	Orlando Maturana	11 October 1965 (aged 27)		(Colombia) América Cali
8	MF	Alexis García	21 July 1960 (aged 32)		(Colombia) Atlético Nacional
9	FW	Víctor Aristizábal	9 December 1971 (aged 21)		(Colombia) Atlético Nacional
10	MF	Carlos Valderrama	2 September 1961 (aged 31)		(Colombia) Atlético Junior
11	FW	Adolfo Valencia	6 February 1968 (aged 25)		(Colombia) Independiente Santa Fe
12	GK	Farid Mondragón	21 June 1971 (aged 21)		(Colombia) Deportivo Cali
13	MF	Víctor Pacheco	24 September 1972 (aged 20)		(Colombia) Atlético Junior
14	MF	Leonel Álvarez	29 July 1965 (aged 27)		(Colombia) América Cali
15	DF	Luis Carlos Perea	29 December 1963 (aged 29)		(Colombia) Independiente Medellín
16	MF	John Harold Lozano	30 March 1972 (aged 21)		(Colombia) América Cali
17	FW	Faustino Asprilla	10 November 1969 (aged 23)		(Italy) Parma
18	DF	Diego Osorio	21 July 1970 (aged 22)		(Colombia) Atlético Nacional
19	MF	Freddy Rincón	14 August 1966 (aged 26)		(Colombia) América Cali
20	DF	Wilson Pérez	9 August 1967 (aged 25)		(Colombia) América Cali
21	DF	Ricardo Pérez	21 July 1973 (aged 19)		(Colombia) Millonarios
22	GK	José María Pazo	4 April 1964 (aged 29)		(Colombia) Atlético Junior

=== 1995 Copa América ===
Head coach: Hernán Darío Gómez

No.	Pos.	Player	Date of birth (age)	Caps	Club
1	GK	René Higuita	28 August 1966 (aged 28)		(Colombia) Atlético Nacional
2	DF	José Santa	12 November 1970 (aged 24)		(Colombia) Atlético Nacional
3	DF	Alexis Mendoza	8 November 1961 (aged 33)		(Colombia) Atlético Junior
4	DF	Alex Fernández	22 May 1970 (aged 25)		(Colombia) Independiente Medellín
5	DF	Jorge Bermúdez	18 June 1971 (aged 24)		(Colombia) América de Cali
6	MF	Hermán Gaviria	27 November 1969 (aged 25)		(Colombia) Atlético Nacional
7	FW	Miguel Ángel Guerrero	7 December 1967 (aged 27)		(Italy) Bari
8	MF	John Harold Lozano	30 March 1972 (aged 23)		(Brazil) Palmeiras
9	FW	Níver Arboleda	12 December 1967 (aged 27)		(Colombia) Deportivo Cali
10	MF	Carlos Valderrama	2 September 1961 (aged 33)		(Colombia) Atlético Junior
11	FW	Faustino Asprilla	10 November 1969 (aged 25)		(Italy) Parma
12	GK	Miguel Calero	14 April 1971 (aged 24)		(Colombia) Deportivo Cali
13	DF	Wilmer Cabrera	15 September 1967 (aged 27)		(Colombia) América de Cali
14	MF	Leonel Álvarez	29 July 1965 (aged 29)		(Colombia) América de Cali
15	MF	Bonner Mosquera	2 December 1970 (aged 24)		(Colombia) Millonarios
16	FW	Víctor Aristizábal	9 December 1971 (aged 23)		(Colombia) Atlético Nacional
17	FW	Freddy León	24 September 1970 (aged 24)		(Colombia) Millonarios
18	DF	James Cardona	30 March 1967 (aged 28)		(Colombia) América de Cali
19	MF	Freddy Rincón	14 August 1966 (aged 28)		(Italy) Napoli
20	MF	Luis Manuel Quiñonez	5 October 1968 (aged 26)		(Colombia) Once Caldas
21	MF	Francisco Cassiani	10 January 1970 (aged 25)		(Colombia) Atlético Junior
22	GK	Oscar Córdoba	3 February 1970 (aged 25)		(Colombia) América de Cali

=== 1997 Copa América ===
Head coach: Hernán Darío Gómez

No.	Pos.	Player	Date of birth (age)	Caps	Goals	Club
1	GK	Faryd Mondragón	21 June 1971 (aged 25)			(Argentina) Independiente
2	DF	Iván Córdoba	11 August 1976 (aged 20)			(Colombia) Atlético Nacional
3	DF	Carlos Asprilla	19 October 1970 (aged 26)			(Colombia) América de Cali
4	DF	José Santa	12 September 1970 (aged 26)			(Colombia) Atlético Nacional
5	DF	Jorge Bermúdez (c)	18 June 1971 (aged 25)			(Portugal) Benfica
6	MF	John Wilmar Pérez	2 February 1970 (aged 27)			(Colombia) Deportivo Cali
7	FW	Luis Zuleta	7 August 1974 (aged 22)			(Colombia) Unión Magdalena
8	MF	Andrés Estrada	12 November 1967 (aged 29)			(Colombia) Deportivo Cali
9	FW	Víctor Aristizábal	9 December 1971 (aged 25)			(Brazil) São Paulo
10	MF	Edison Mafla	14 August 1971 (aged 25)			(Colombia) Deportivo Cali
11	FW	Faustino Asprilla	10 November 1969 (aged 27)			(England) Newcastle
12	GK	Miguel Calero	14 April 1971 (aged 26)			(Colombia) Deportivo Cali
13	DF	Wilmer Cabrera	15 September 1967 (aged 29)			(Colombia) América de Cali
14	MF	Hernán Gaviria	27 November 1969 (aged 27)			(Colombia) Atlético Nacional
15	MF	Francisco Mosquera	5 November 1973 (aged 23)			(Colombia) Atlético Nacional
16	DF	Luis Antonio Moreno	25 December 1970 (aged 26)			(Colombia) Deportes Tolima
17	FW	Hámilton Ricard	1 January 1974 (aged 23)			(Colombia) Deportivo Cali
18	FW	Víctor Bonilla	23 January 1971 (aged 26)			(Colombia) Deportivo Cali
19	FW	Walter Escobar	26 September 1968 (aged 28)			(Colombia) Deportivo Cali
20	MF	Víctor Pacheco	24 September 1974 (aged 22)			(Colombia) Atlético Junior
21	MF	Martín Zapata	28 October 1970 (aged 26)			(Colombia) Deportivo Cali
22	MF	Neider Morantes	3 August 1975 (aged 21)			(Colombia) Atlético Nacional

=== 1999 Copa América ===
Head coach: Javier Álvarez Arteaga

No.	Pos.	Player	Date of birth (age)	Caps	Goals	Club
1	GK	Miguel Calero	14 April 1971 (aged 28)			(Colombia) Atlético Nacional
2	DF	Iván Córdoba	11 August 1976 (aged 22)			(Argentina) San Lorenzo
3	DF	Roberto Carlos Cortés	20 June 1977 (aged 22)			(Colombia) Independiente Medellín
4	DF	Alexander Viveros	8 October 1977 (aged 21)			(Colombia) Deportivo Cali
5	DF	Jorge Bermúdez (c)	18 June 1971 (aged 28)			(Argentina) Boca Juniors
6	MF	Juan Carlos Ramírez	22 March 1972 (aged 27)			(Colombia) Independiente Medellín
7	FW	Edwin Congo	7 October 1976 (aged 22)			(Colombia) Once Caldas
8	MF	Harold Lozano	30 March 1972 (aged 27)			(Spain) Real Valladolid
9	FW	Víctor Bonilla	23 January 1971 (aged 28)			(Colombia) Deportivo Cali
10	MF	Neider Morantes	3 August 1975 (aged 23)			(Colombia) Atlético Nacional
11	FW	Henry Zambrano	7 August 1973 (aged 25)			(Colombia) Atlético Nacional
12	GK	René Higuita	27 August 1966 (aged 32)			(Colombia) Independiente Medellín
13	MF	Jorge Bolaño	28 April 1977 (aged 22)			(Colombia) Atlético Junior
14	MF	Arley Betancourth	4 March 1975 (aged 24)			(Colombia) Deportivo Cali
15	DF	Pedro Portocarrero	5 July 1977 (aged 21)			(Colombia) Independiente Santa Fe
16	DF	Jersson González	16 February 1975 (aged 24)			(Colombia) América de Cali
17	FW	Johnnier Montaño	14 January 1983 (aged 16)			(Argentina) Quilmes
18	MF	Rubiel Quintana	26 June 1978 (aged 21)			(Colombia) Cortuluá
19	FW	Hámilton Ricard	1 January 1974 (aged 25)			(England) Middlesbrough
20	MF	Freddy Grisales	22 September 1975 (aged 23)			(Colombia) Atlético Nacional
21	DF	Mario Yepes	13 January 1976 (aged 23)			(Colombia) Deportivo Cali
22	GK	Agustín Julio	25 October 1974 (aged 24)			(Colombia) Independiente Santa Fe

=== 2001 Copa América ===
Head coach: Francisco Maturana

No.	Pos.	Player	Date of birth (age)	Caps	Goals	Club
1	GK	Óscar Córdoba	9 February 1970 (aged 31)			(Argentina) Boca Juniors
2	DF	Iván Córdoba (c)	11 August 1976 (aged 24)			(Italy) Internazionale
3	DF	Mario Yepes	13 January 1976 (aged 25)			(Argentina) River Plate
4	DF	Roberto Carlos Cortés	20 June 1977 (aged 24)			(Colombia) Independiente Medellín
5	DF	Andrés Orozco	18 March 1979 (aged 22)			(Colombia) Independiente Medellín
6	MF	Fabián Vargas	17 April 1980 (aged 21)			(Colombia) América de Cali
7	FW	Elson Becerra	26 April 1978 (aged 23)			(Colombia) Deportes Tolima
8	MF	David Ferreira	9 August 1979 (aged 21)			(Colombia) América de Cali
10	FW	Víctor Aristizábal	9 December 1971 (aged 29)			(Colombia) Deportivo Cali
11	FW	Eudalio Arriaga	19 September 1975 (aged 25)			(Colombia) Atlético Junior
12	GK	Miguel Calero	14 April 1971 (aged 30)			(Mexico) Pachuca
13	MF	John Restrepo	22 August 1977 (aged 23)			(Colombia) Independiente Medellín
14	DF	Iván López	13 May 1978 (aged 23)			(Colombia) Santa Fe
15	FW	Elkin Murillo	20 September 1977 (aged 23)			(Colombia) Deportivo Cali
16	DF	Jersson González	16 February 1975 (aged 26)			(Colombia) América de Cali
17	MF	Juan Carlos Ramírez	22 March 1972 (aged 29)			(Colombia) Atlético Junior
18	FW	Jairo Castillo	17 November 1977 (aged 23)			(Argentina) Vélez Sársfield
19	MF	Freddy Grisales	22 September 1975 (aged 25)			(Colombia) Atlético Nacional
20	DF	Gerardo Bedoya	26 September 1975 (aged 25)			(Colombia) Deportivo Cali
21	MF	Óscar Díaz	6 June 1972 (aged 29)			(Colombia) Cortuluá
23	MF	Mauricio Molina	30 April 1980 (aged 21)			(Colombia) Envigado
24	MF	Giovanni Hernández	16 June 1976 (aged 25)			(Colombia) Deportivo Cali

=== 2004 Copa América ===
Head coach: Reinaldo Rueda

No.	Pos.	Player	Date of birth (age)	Caps	Goals	Club
1	GK	Juan Carlos Henao	30 December 1971 (aged 32)			(Colombian Football Federation) Once Caldas
2	DF	Andrés González	8 January 1984 (aged 20)			(Colombian Football Federation) América de Cali
3	MF	Jaime Castrillón	5 April 1983 (aged 21)			(Colombian Football Federation) Independiente Medellín
4	DF	Jésus Sinisterra	9 December 1975 (aged 28)			(German Football Association) Arminia Bielefeld
5	DF	Andrés Orozco	24 January 1971 (aged 33)			(Argentine Football Association) Racing Club
6	MF	Oscar Díaz	6 June 1972 (aged 32)			(Colombian Football Federation) Deportivo Cali
7	FW	Tressor Moreno	11 January 1979 (aged 25)			(Colombian Football Federation) Deportivo Cali
8	MF	David Ferreira	9 August 1979 (aged 24)			(Colombian Football Federation) América de Cali
9	FW	Sergio Herrera	15 March 1981 (aged 23)			(Colombian Football Federation) América de Cali
10	MF	Neider Morantes	3 August 1975 (aged 28)			(Colombian Football Federation) Independiente Medellín
11	FW	Elkin Murillo	20 September 1977 (aged 26)			(Ecuadorian Football Federation) LDU Quito
12	GK	Bréiner Castillo	5 May 1978 (aged 26)			(Colombian Football Federation) Deportivo Cali
13	DF	Arley Dinas	16 May 1974 (aged 30)			(Colombian Football Federation) Deportes Tolima
14	FW	Edixon Perea Valencia	20 April 1984 (aged 20)			(Colombian Football Federation) Atlético Nacional
15	MF	Jhon Viáfara	27 October 1978 (aged 25)			(Colombian Football Federation) Once Caldas
16	FW	Edwin Congo	7 October 1976 (aged 27)			(Royal Spanish Football Federation) Levante
17	MF	Jairo Patiño	5 April 1978 (aged 26)			(Argentine Football Association) Newell's Old Boys
18	MF	Abel Aguilar	6 January 1985 (aged 19)			(Colombian Football Federation) Deportivo Cali
19	MF	José Amaya	16 July 1980 (aged 23)			(Colombian Football Federation) Atlético Junior
20	DF	Gustavo Victoria	14 May 1980 (aged 24)			(Turkish Football Federation) Çaykur Rizespor
21	DF	Hayder Palacio	22 July 1979 (aged 24)			(Colombian Football Federation) Atlético Junior
22	DF	Gonzalo Martínez	30 November 1975 (aged 28)			(Italian Football Federation) Napoli

=== 2007 Copa América ===
Head coach: Jorge Luis Pinto

No.	Pos.	Player	Date of birth (age)	Caps	Goals	Club
1	GK	Miguel Calero	14 April 1971 (aged 36)			(Mexican Football Federation) Pachuca
2	DF	Iván Córdoba	11 August 1976 (aged 30)			(Italian Football Federation) Internazionale
3	DF	Mario Yepes	13 January 1976 (aged 31)			(French Football Federation) Paris Saint-Germain
4	DF	Gerardo Vallejo	3 December 1976 (aged 30)			(Colombian Football Federation) Deportes Tolima
5	DF	Javier Arizala	21 April 1984 (aged 23)			(Colombian Football Federation) Deportes Tolima
6	MF	Fabián Vargas	17 April 1980 (aged 27)			(Brazilian Football Confederation) Internacional
7	FW	Edixon Perea	20 April 1984 (aged 23)			(French Football Federation) Bordeaux
8	MF	David Ferreira	9 August 1979 (aged 27)			(Brazilian Football Confederation) Atlético Paranaense
9	MF	Álvaro Domínguez	10 August 1981 (aged 25)			(Colombian Football Federation) Deportivo Cali
10	FW	Andrés Chitiva	13 August 1979 (aged 27)			(Mexican Football Federation) Pachuca
11	FW	Hugo Rodallega	25 July 1985 (aged 21)			(Mexican Football Federation) Necaxa
12	GK	Róbinson Zapata	30 September 1978 (aged 28)			(Colombian Football Federation) Cúcuta Deportivo
13	MF	Vladimir Marín	26 September 1979 (aged 27)			(Paraguayan Football Association) Libertad
14	DF	Luis Amaranto Perea	30 January 1979 (aged 28)			(Royal Spanish Football Federation) Atlético Madrid
15	MF	Jhon Viáfara	27 October 1978 (aged 28)			(The Football Association) Southampton
16	DF	Jair Benítez	12 January 1979 (aged 28)			(Colombian Football Federation) Deportivo Cali
17	MF	Jaime Alberto Castrillón	5 April 1983 (aged 24)			(Colombian Football Federation) Independiente Medellín
18	FW	Luis Gabriel Rey	20 February 1980 (aged 27)			(Mexican Football Federation) Pachuca
19	FW	César Valoyes	5 January 1984 (aged 23)			(Colombian Football Federation) Independiente Medellín
20	MF	Macnelly Torres	1 November 1984 (aged 22)			(Colombian Football Federation) Cúcuta Deportivo
21	MF	Jorge Banguero	4 October 1974 (aged 32)			(Colombian Football Federation) América de Cali
22	DF	Juan Camilo Zúñiga	14 December 1985 (aged 21)			(Colombian Football Federation) Atlético Nacional

=== 2011 Copa América ===
Head coach: Hernán Darío Gómez

No.	Pos.	Player	Date of birth (age)	Caps	Goals	Club
1	GK	Nelson Fernando Ramos	23 November 1981 (aged 29)	0	0	(Colombian Football Federation) Millonarios
2	DF	Cristián Zapata	30 September 1986 (aged 24)	14	0	(Italian Football Federation) Udinese
3	DF	Mario Yepes (c)	13 January 1976 (aged 35)	78	4	(Italian Football Federation) Milan
4	MF	Gustavo Bolívar	16 April 1985 (aged 26)	2	0	(Colombian Football Federation) Deportes Tolima
5	MF	Yulián Anchico	28 May 1984 (aged 27)	30	1	(Mexican Football Federation) Pachuca
6	MF	Carlos Sánchez	6 February 1986 (aged 25)	19	1	(French Football Federation) Valenciennes
7	DF	Pablo Armero	2 November 1986 (aged 24)	22	0	(Italian Football Federation) Udinese
8	MF	Abel Aguilar	6 January 1985 (aged 26)	25	5	(Royal Spanish Football Federation) Hércules
9	FW	Radamel Falcao	10 February 1986 (aged 25)	30	7	(Portuguese Football Federation) Porto
10	MF	Juan Cuadrado	26 May 1988 (aged 23)	8	1	(Italian Football Federation) Udinese
11	FW	Hugo Rodallega	25 July 1985 (aged 25)	38	8	(The Football Association) Wigan Athletic
12	GK	Neco Martínez	11 July 1982 (aged 28)	10	1	(Colombian Football Federation) Once Caldas
13	MF	Fredy Guarín	30 June 1986 (aged 25)	30	1	(Portuguese Football Federation) Porto
14	DF	Luis Amaranto Perea	30 January 1979 (aged 32)	54	0	(Royal Spanish Football Federation) Atlético Madrid
15	DF	Juan David Valencia	15 January 1986 (aged 25)	6	0	(Colombian Football Federation) Junior
16	MF	Elkin Soto	4 August 1980 (aged 30)	18	6	(German Football Association) Mainz 05
17	MF	Dayro Moreno	16 September 1985 (aged 25)	17	2	(Colombian Football Federation) Once Caldas
18	DF	Juan Camilo Zúñiga	14 December 1985 (aged 25)	30	0	(Italian Football Federation) Napoli
19	FW	Teófilo Gutiérrez	27 May 1985 (aged 26)	7	2	(Argentine Football Association) Racing Club
20	FW	Adrián Ramos	22 January 1986 (aged 25)	15	1	(German Football Association) Hertha BSC
21	FW	Jackson Martínez	3 October 1986 (aged 24)	8	4	(Mexican Football Federation) Chiapas
22	DF	Aquivaldo Mosquera	22 June 1981 (aged 30)	19	1	(Mexican Football Federation) América
23	GK	Bréiner Castillo	5 May 1978 (aged 33)	4	0	(Colombian Football Federation) Independiente Medellín

=== 2015 Copa América ===
Head coach: (Argentina) José Pékerman

No.	Pos.	Player	Date of birth (age)	Caps	Goals	Club
1	GK	David Ospina	31 August 1988 (aged 26)	52	0	(The Football Association) Arsenal
2	DF	Cristián Zapata	30 September 1986 (aged 28)	31	0	(Italian Football Federation) Milan
3	DF	Pedro Franco	23 April 1991 (aged 24)	4	0	(Turkish Football Federation) Beşiktaş
4	DF	Santiago Arias	13 January 1992 (aged 23)	14	0	(Royal Dutch Football Association) PSV Eindhoven
5	MF	Edwin Valencia	29 March 1985 (aged 30)	15	0	(Brazilian Football Confederation) Santos
6	MF	Carlos Sánchez	6 February 1986 (aged 29)	54	0	(The Football Association) Aston Villa
7	DF	Pablo Armero	2 November 1986 (aged 28)	63	2	(Brazilian Football Confederation) Flamengo
8	MF	Edwin Cardona	8 December 1992 (aged 22)	4	1	(Mexican Football Federation) Monterrey
9	FW	Radamel Falcao (captain)	10 February 1986 (aged 29)	56	24	(The Football Association) Manchester United
10	MF	James Rodríguez	12 July 1991 (aged 23)	32	12	(Royal Spanish Football Federation) Real Madrid
11	MF	Juan Cuadrado	26 May 1988 (aged 27)	39	5	(The Football Association) Chelsea
12	GK	Camilo Vargas	1 September 1989 (aged 25)	4	0	(Colombian Football Federation) Atlético Nacional
13	DF	Darwin Andrade	11 February 1991 (aged 24)	2	0	(Royal Belgian Football Association) Standard Liège
14	DF	Carlos Valdés	22 May 1985 (aged 30)	16	2	(Uruguayan Football Association) Nacional
15	MF	Alexander Mejía	7 September 1988 (aged 26)	17	0	(Mexican Football Federation) Monterrey
16	FW	Víctor Ibarbo	19 May 1990 (aged 25)	12	1	(Italian Football Federation) Roma
17	FW	Carlos Bacca	8 September 1986 (aged 28)	17	7	(Royal Spanish Football Federation) Sevilla
18	DF	Juan Camilo Zúñiga	14 December 1985 (aged 29)	58	1	(Italian Football Federation) Napoli
19	FW	Teófilo Gutiérrez	28 May 1985 (aged 30)	38	14	(Argentine Football Association) River Plate
20	FW	Luis Muriel	18 April 1991 (aged 24)	5	1	(Italian Football Federation) Sampdoria
21	FW	Jackson Martínez	3 October 1986 (aged 28)	35	10	(Portuguese Football Federation) Porto
22	DF	Jeison Murillo	27 May 1992 (aged 23)	5	0	(Royal Spanish Football Federation) Granada
23	GK	Cristian Bonilla	2 June 1993 (aged 22)	0	0	(Colombian Football Federation) La Equidad

=== Copa América Centenario ===
Head coach: (Argentina) José Pékerman

No.	Pos.	Player	Date of birth (age)	Caps	Goals	Club
1	GK	David Ospina	31 August 1988 (aged 27)	64	0	(The Football Association) Arsenal
2	DF	Cristián Zapata	30 September 1986 (aged 29)	40	0	(Italian Football Federation) Milan
3	DF	Yerry Mina	23 September 1994 (aged 21)	2	0	(Colombian Football Federation) Santa Fe
4	DF	Santiago Arias	13 January 1992 (aged 24)	21	0	(Royal Dutch Football Association) PSV Eindhoven
5	MF	Guillermo Celis	8 May 1993 (aged 23)	1	0	(Colombian Football Federation) Junior
6	MF	Carlos Sánchez	6 February 1986 (aged 30)	62	0	(The Football Association) Aston Villa
7	FW	Carlos Bacca	8 September 1986 (aged 29)	27	11	(Italian Football Federation) Milan
8	MF	Edwin Cardona	8 December 1992 (aged 23)	14	3	(Mexican Football Federation) Monterrey
9	FW	Roger Martínez	23 June 1994 (aged 21)	0	0	(Argentine Football Association) Racing
10	MF	James Rodríguez (captain)	12 July 1991 (aged 24)	42	14	(Royal Spanish Football Federation) Real Madrid
11	MF	Juan Guillermo Cuadrado	26 May 1988 (aged 28)	49	5	(Italian Football Federation) Juventus
12	GK	Róbinson Zapata	30 September 1978 (aged 37)	3	0	(Colombian Football Federation) Santa Fe
13	MF	Sebastián Pérez	29 March 1993 (aged 23)	2	1	(Colombian Football Federation) Atlético Nacional
14	DF	Felipe Aguilar	20 January 1993 (aged 23)	0	0	(Colombian Football Federation) Atlético Nacional
15	DF	Stefan Medina	14 June 1992 (aged 23)	4	0	(Mexican Football Federation) Pachuca
16	MF	Dani Torres	15 November 1989 (aged 26)	4	0	(Colombian Football Federation) Independiente Medellín
17	FW	Dayro Moreno	16 September 1985 (aged 30)	27	2	(Mexican Football Federation) Tijuana
18	DF	Frank Fabra	22 February 1991 (aged 25)	5	0	(Argentine Football Association) Boca Juniors
19	DF	Farid Díaz	20 July 1983 (aged 32)	2	0	(Colombian Football Federation) Atlético Nacional
20	MF	Andrés Felipe Roa	25 May 1993 (aged 23)	1	0	(Colombian Football Federation) Deportivo Cali
21	FW	Marlos Moreno	20 September 1996 (aged 19)	2	0	(Colombian Football Federation) Atlético Nacional
22	DF	Jeison Murillo	27 May 1992 (aged 24)	16	1	(Italian Football Federation) Inter Milan
23	GK	Cristian Bonilla	2 June 1993 (aged 23)	0	0	(Colombian Football Federation) Atlético Nacional

=== 2019 Copa América ===
Head coach: (Portugal) Carlos Queiroz

No.	Pos.	Player	Date of birth (age)	Caps	Goals	Club
1	GK	David Ospina	31 August 1988 (aged 30)	94	0	(Italian Football Federation) Napoli
2	DF	Cristián Zapata	30 September 1986 (aged 32)	56	2	(Italian Football Federation) Milan
3	DF	Stefan Medina	14 June 1992 (aged 27)	10	0	(Mexican Football Federation) Monterrey
4	DF	Santiago Arias	13 January 1992 (aged 27)	48	0	(Royal Spanish Football Federation) Atlético Madrid
5	MF	Wilmar Barrios	16 October 1993 (aged 25)	19	0	(Russian Football Union) Zenit Saint Petersburg
6	DF	William Tesillo	2 February 1990 (aged 29)	4	0	(Mexican Football Federation) León
7	FW	Duván Zapata	1 April 1991 (aged 28)	7	1	(Italian Football Federation) Atalanta
8	MF	Edwin Cardona	8 December 1992 (aged 26)	33	5	(Mexican Football Federation) Pachuca
9	FW	Radamel Falcao (captain)	10 February 1986 (aged 33)	83	33	(French Football Federation) Monaco
10	MF	James Rodríguez	12 July 1991 (aged 27)	70	22	(German Football Association) Bayern Munich
11	MF	Juan Cuadrado	26 May 1988 (aged 31)	78	8	(Italian Football Federation) Juventus
12	GK	Camilo Vargas	9 March 1989 (aged 30)	6	0	(Colombian Football Federation) Deportivo Cali
13	DF	Yerry Mina	23 September 1994 (aged 24)	17	6	(The Football Association) Everton
14	FW	Luis Díaz	13 January 1997 (aged 22)	3	1	(Colombian Football Federation) Junior
15	MF	Mateus Uribe	21 March 1991 (aged 28)	17	0	(Mexican Football Federation) América
16	MF	Jefferson Lerma	25 October 1994 (aged 24)	10	0	(The Football Association) AFC Bournemouth
17	DF	Cristian Borja	18 February 1993 (aged 26)	3	0	(Portuguese Football Federation) Sporting CP
18	MF	Gustavo Cuéllar	14 October 1992 (aged 26)	5	0	(Brazilian Football Confederation) Flamengo
19	FW	Luis Muriel	16 April 1991 (aged 28)	24	2	(Italian Football Federation) Fiorentina
20	FW	Roger Martínez	23 June 1994 (aged 24)	7	2	(Mexican Football Federation) América
21	DF	Jhon Lucumí	26 June 1998 (aged 20)	0	0	(Royal Belgian Football Association) Genk
22	GK	Álvaro Montero	29 March 1995 (aged 24)	0	0	(Colombian Football Federation) Deportes Tolima
23	DF	Davinson Sánchez	12 June 1996 (aged 23)	19	0	(The Football Association) Tottenham Hotspur

=== 2021 Copa América ===
Head coach: Reinaldo Rueda

No.	Pos.	Player	Date of birth (age)	Caps	Goals	Club
1	GK	David Ospina (captain)	31 August 1988 (aged 32)	107	0	(Italian Football Federation) Napoli
2	DF	Stefan Medina	14 June 1992 (aged 28)	23	0	(Mexican Football Federation) Monterrey
3	DF	Óscar Murillo	18 April 1988 (aged 33)	17	0	(Mexican Football Federation) Pachuca
4	DF	Carlos Cuesta	9 March 1999 (aged 22)	0	0	(Royal Belgian Football Association) Genk
5	MF	Wilmar Barrios	16 October 1993 (aged 27)	35	0	(Russian Football Union) Zenit Saint Petersburg
6	DF	William Tesillo	2 February 1990 (aged 31)	15	1	(Mexican Football Federation) León
7	FW	Duván Zapata	1 April 1991 (aged 30)	22	4	(Italian Football Federation) Atalanta
8	MF	Gustavo Cuéllar	14 October 1992 (aged 28)	9	1	(Saudi Arabian Football Federation) Al-Hilal Saudi
9	FW	Luis Muriel	16 April 1991 (aged 30)	38	8	(Italian Football Federation) Atalanta
10	MF	Edwin Cardona	8 December 1992 (aged 28)	41	5	(Argentine Football Association) Boca Juniors
11	MF	Juan Cuadrado	26 May 1988 (aged 33)	96	8	(Italian Football Federation) Juventus
12	GK	Camilo Vargas	9 March 1989 (aged 32)	9	0	(Mexican Football Federation) Atlas
13	DF	Yerry Mina	23 September 1994 (aged 26)	28	7	(The Football Association) Everton
14	FW	Luis Díaz	13 January 1997 (aged 24)	18	2	(Portuguese Football Federation) Porto
15	MF	Mateus Uribe	21 March 1991 (aged 30)	30	4	(Portuguese Football Federation) Porto
16	DF	Daniel Muñoz	25 May 1996 (aged 25)	1	0	(Royal Belgian Football Association) Genk
17	MF	Yairo Moreno	4 April 1995 (aged 26)	8	0	(Mexican Football Federation) Pachuca
18	FW	Rafael Santos Borré	15 September 1995 (aged 25)	3	0	(Argentine Football Association) River Plate
19	FW	Miguel Borja	26 January 1993 (aged 28)	12	4	(Colombian Football Federation) Junior
20	FW	Alfredo Morelos	21 June 1996 (aged 24)	10	1	(Scottish Football Association) Rangers
21	MF	Sebastián Pérez	29 March 1993 (aged 28)	8	1	(Portuguese Football Federation) Boavista
22	GK	Aldair Quintana	11 July 1994 (aged 26)	0	0	(Colombian Football Federation) Atlético Nacional
23	DF	Davinson Sánchez	12 June 1996 (aged 25)	34	0	(The Football Association) Tottenham Hotspur
24	DF	Jhon Lucumí	26 June 1998 (aged 22)	4	0	(Royal Belgian Football Association) Genk
25	MF	Baldomero Perlaza	25 June 1992 (aged 28)	0	0	(Colombian Football Federation) Atlético Nacional
26	DF	Frank Fabra	22 February 1991 (aged 30)	22	1	(Argentine Football Association) Boca Juniors
27	MF	Jaminton Campaz	24 May 2000 (aged 21)	0	0	(Colombian Football Federation) Deportes Tolima
28	FW	Yimmi Chará	2 April 1991 (aged 30)	10	1	(United States Soccer Federation) Portland Timbers

=== 2024 Copa América ===
Head coach: (Argentina) Néstor Lorenzo

No.	Pos.	Player	Date of birth (age)	Caps	Goals	Club
1	GK	David Ospina	31 August 1988 (aged 35)	128	0	(Saudi Arabian Football Federation) Al Nassr
2	DF	Carlos Cuesta	9 March 1999 (aged 25)	14	0	(Royal Belgian Football Association) Genk
3	DF	Jhon Lucumí	26 June 1998 (aged 25)	19	0	(Italian Football Federation) Bologna
4	DF	Santiago Arias	13 January 1992 (aged 32)	57	0	(Brazilian Football Confederation) Bahia
5	MF	Kevin Castaño	29 September 2000 (aged 23)	9	0	(Russian Football Union) Krasnodar
6	MF	Richard Ríos	2 June 2000 (aged 24)	7	1	(Brazilian Football Confederation) Palmeiras
7	FW	Luis Díaz	13 January 1997 (aged 27)	49	12	(The Football Association) Liverpool
8	MF	Jorge Carrascal	25 May 1998 (aged 26)	14	2	(Russian Football Union) Dynamo Moscow
9	FW	Miguel Borja	26 January 1993 (aged 31)	28	8	(Argentine Football Association) River Plate
10	MF	James Rodríguez (captain)	12 July 1991 (aged 32)	100	27	(Brazilian Football Confederation) São Paulo
11	MF	Jhon Arias	21 September 1997 (aged 26)	15	3	(Brazilian Football Confederation) Fluminense
12	GK	Camilo Vargas	9 March 1989 (aged 35)	23	0	(Mexican Football Federation) Atlas
13	DF	Yerry Mina	24 September 1994 (aged 29)	44	7	(Italian Football Federation) Cagliari
14	FW	Jhon Durán	13 December 2003 (aged 20)	9	1	(The Football Association) Aston Villa
15	MF	Mateus Uribe	21 March 1991 (aged 33)	55	6	(Qatar Football Association) Al Sadd
16	MF	Jefferson Lerma	25 October 1994 (aged 29)	43	1	(The Football Association) Crystal Palace
17	DF	Johan Mojica	21 August 1992 (aged 31)	25	1	(Royal Spanish Football Federation) Osasuna
18	FW	Luis Sinisterra	17 June 1999 (aged 25)	13	4	(The Football Association) Bournemouth
19	FW	Rafael Santos Borré	15 September 1995 (aged 28)	33	6	(Brazilian Football Confederation) Internacional
20	MF	Juan Fernando Quintero	18 January 1993 (aged 31)	35	4	(Argentine Football Association) Racing
21	DF	Daniel Muñoz	26 May 1996 (aged 28)	27	1	(The Football Association) Crystal Palace
22	MF	Yáser Asprilla	19 November 2003 (aged 20)	5	2	(The Football Association) Watford
23	DF	Davinson Sánchez	12 June 1996 (aged 28)	59	1	(Turkish Football Federation) Galatasaray
24	FW	Jhon Córdoba	11 May 1993 (aged 31)	4	2	(Russian Football Union) Krasnodar
25	GK	Álvaro Montero	29 March 1995 (aged 29)	8	0	(Colombian Football Federation) Millonarios
26	DF	Deiver Machado	2 September 1992 (aged 31)	10	0	(French Football Federation) Lens

== See also ==
- Colombia national football team results
- List of Colombia international footballers
