= List of Atlético Nacional players =

Atlético Nacional is a professional Colombian football team based in Medellín. Considered to be one of the strongest clubs from Colombia, it is one of the most consistent clubs in the country. Atlético Nacional was founded in 1947 by Julio Ortiz, Jorge Osorio Cadavid, Jorge Gómez, Arturo Torres, Gilberto Molina, Alberto Eastman, Raúl Zapata Lotero and Luis Alberto Villegas Lopera.

This is a list of notable footballers who have played for Atlético Nacional. They must have had at least 100 appearances with the club, have made a significant contribution for the achievement of a title or played for the national team while in the club.

== List of players ==
Name	Nationality	Positions	Atlético Nacional career	Club Apps	Club Goals	NT Apps	NT Goals	Notes
Ignacio Calle	Colombia	Defender	1951–1965	346	0	5	0	He was part of the national squad for the 1962 FIFA World Cup.
Jairo Arias	Colombia	Forward	1957–1959; 1961–1962	154	35	4	0	He was part of the national squad for the 1962 FIFA World Cup and the 1963 South American Championship.
Jorge Hugo Fernández	Argentina	Midfielder	1970–1973	157	45	4	1	He was part of the national squad for the 1963 South American Championship.
Francisco Maturana	Colombia	Defender	1970–1980	359	15	6	0	
Oscar Calics	Argentina	Defender	1971–1973	120	0	6	0	He was part of the national squad for the 1966 FIFA World Cup and the 1967 South American Championship.
Hugo Lóndero	Colombia	Striker	1973–1976	164	76	3	0	He was part of the national squad for the 1975 Copa América.
Ramón Bóveda	Argentina	Winger	1976–1977			8	1	He was part of the national squad for the 1975 Copa América.
Eduardo Vilarete	Colombia	Forward	1976; 1979–1981	102	44	21	7	He was part of the national squad for the 1979 Copa América.
Alejandro Semenewicz	Argentina	Defender	1977–1978	126	0	9	0	
Hernán Herrera	Colombia	Midfielder	1976–1984			37	10	He was part of the national squad for the 1979 Copa América and the 1983 Copa América.
Pedro Sarmiento	Colombia	Midfielder	1977–1984	346	23	37	3	He was part of the national squad for the 1980 Summer Olympics and the 1983 Copa América.
César Cueto	Peru	Midfielder	1978–1983	165	57	51	6	He was part of the national squad for the 1975 Copa América, 1978 FIFA World Cup and the 1982 FIFA World Cup.
Víctor Luna	Colombia	Defender	1978–1985; 1989			21	0	He was part of the national squad for the 1983 Copa América.
Carlos Ricaurte	Colombia	Midfielder	1978–1987	279	39	9	0	
Guillermo La Rosa	Peru	Striker	1979–1983	160	50	36	3	He was part of the national squad for the 1975 Copa América, 1978 FIFA World Cup and the 1982 FIFA World Cup.
Sergio Santín	Uruguay	Midfielder	1983–1986	107	26	18	0	He was part of the national squad for the 1986 FIFA World Cup.
Luis Fernando Suárez	Colombia	Defender	1981–1985; 1987–1989	188	2	0	0	
Gabriel Gómez	Colombia	Midfielder	1981–1986; 1991–1994	283	39	49	2	He was part of the national squad for the 1987 Copa América, 1989 Copa América, 1990 FIFA World Cup, 1993 Copa América and the 1994 FIFA World Cup.
Luis Fernando Herrera	Colombia	Defender	1987–1996	286	2	61	0	He was part of the national squad for the 1987 Copa América, 1990 FIFA World Cup, 1991 Copa América, 1993 Copa América and the 1994 FIFA World Cup.
José Luis Brown	Argentina	Defender	1983–1986	87	14	36	1	He was part of the national squad for the 1983 Copa América, 1986 FIFA World Cup, 1987 Copa América and the 1989 Copa América.
León Villa	Colombia	Defender	1984–1991	307	6	7	0	He was part of the national squad for the 1989 Copa América and the 1990 FIFA World Cup.
Luis Fajardo	Colombia	Midfielder	1984–1992	169	14	15	1	He was part of the national squad for the 1990 FIFA World Cup.
Nelson Gutiérrez	Uruguay	Defender	1985	28	0	57	0	He was part of the national squad for the 1983 Copa América, 1986 FIFA World Cup, 1987 Copa América, 1989 Copa América, and the 1990 FIFA World Cup.
Gustavo Benítez	Paraguay	Midfielder	1985–1987			43	2	He was part of the national squad for the 1975 Copa América, 1983 Copa América and the 1987 Copa América.
John Jairo Tréllez	Colombia	Striker	1985–1989; 1991–1994	271	116	25	3	He was part of the national squad for the 1987 Copa América and the 1989 Copa América.
René Higuita	Colombia	Goalkeeper	1987–1992; 1994–1997	181	4	67	3	He was part of the national squad for the 1987 Copa América, 1989 Copa América, 1990 FIFA World Cup, 1991 Copa América, 1995 Copa América and the 1999 Copa América.
Alexis García	Colombia	Midfielder	1987–1998	443	57	25	2	He was part of the national squad for the 1989 Copa América, 1991 Copa América and the 1993 Copa América.
Andrés Escobar	Colombia	Defender	1986–1989; 1990–1994	222	0	51	1	He was part of the national squad for the 1989 Copa América, 1990 FIFA World Cup, 1991 Copa América, and the 1994 FIFA World Cup.
José Ricardo Pérez	Colombia	Midfielder	1987–1992	151	7	17	0	He was part of the national squad for the 1987 Copa América, 1990 FIFA World Cup, and the 1993 Copa América.
Gildardo Gómez	Colombia	Defender	1987–1993	123	1	21	0	He was part of the national squad for the 1989 Copa América, and the 1990 FIFA World Cup.
Leonel Álvarez	Colombia	Midfielder	1987–1989	42	0	100	1	He was part of the national squad for the 1987 Copa América, 1989 Copa América, 1990 FIFA World Cup, 1991 Copa América, 1993 Copa América, 1994 FIFA World Cup and the 1995 Copa América.
Luis Carlos Perea	Colombia	Defender	1987–1990	76	6	78	2	He was part of the national squad for the 1987 Copa América, 1989 Copa América, 1990 FIFA World Cup, 1991 Copa América, 1993 Copa América and the 1994 FIFA World Cup.
Níver Arboleda	Colombia	Forward	1988–1991	103	20	5	0	He was part of the national squad for the 1995 Copa América.
José Santa	Colombia	Defender	1988–1998	216	1	27	0	He was part of the national squad for the 1995 Copa América, 1997 Copa América and the 1998 FIFA World Cup.
Albeiro Usuriaga	Colombia	Forward	1989	17	2	15	1	He was part of the national squad for the 1991 Copa América.
Faustino Asprilla	Colombia	Striker	1989–1992; 2002	89	38	57	20	He was part of the national squad for the 1993 Copa América, 1994 FIFA World Cup, 1995 Copa América, 1997 Copa América, 1998 FIFA World Cup and the 2000 CONCACAF Gold Cup.
Víctor Aristizábal	Colombia	Striker	1989–1993; 1994–1995; 2000; 2005–2007	258	146	66	15	He was part of the national squad for the 1993 Copa América, 1994 FIFA World Cup, 1995 Copa América, 1997 Copa América, 1998 FIFA World Cup, 2001 Copa América and the 2003 FIFA Confederations Cup.
Víctor Hugo Marulanda	Colombia	Defender	1989–1996; 1998–1999	249	4	2	0	
Hernán Gaviria	Colombia	Midfielder	1990–1997	218	17	27	3	He was part of the national squad for the 1993 Copa América, 1994 FIFA World Cup, 1995 Copa América and the 1997 Copa América.
Diego Osorio	Colombia	Defender	1991–1995; 1997–1998	154	13	17	0	He was part of the national squad for the 1991 Copa América and the 1993 Copa América.
Mauricio Serna	Colombia	Midfielder	1991–1997; 2005	278	29	51	2	He was part of the national squad for the 1994 FIFA World Cup and the 1998 FIFA World Cup.
Juan Pablo Ángel	Colombia	Striker	1993–1997; 2013–2014	194	62	33	9	
Neider Morantes	Colombia	Midfielder	1994–2000; 2002–2003	93	9	21	4	He was part of the national squad for the 1997 Copa América, 1999 Copa América and the 2004 Copa América.
Iván Córdoba	Colombia	Defender	1996–1997	73	1	73	5	He was part of the national squad for the 1997 Copa América, 1998 FIFA World Cup, 1999 Copa América, 2001 Copa América, 2003 FIFA Confederations Cup and the 2007 Copa América.
Freddy Grisales	Colombia	Midfielder	1996–1999; 2000–2004	187	24	41	6	He was part of the national squad for the 1999 Copa América and the 2001 Copa América.
Henry Zambrano	Colombia	Striker	1998–1999	59	22	11	0	He was part of the national squad for the 1999 Copa América.
Miguel Calero	Colombia	Goalkeeper	1998–2000	94	0	51	0	He was part of the national squad for the 1991 Copa América, 1995 Copa América, 1997 Copa América, 1998 FIFA World Cup, 1999 Copa América, 2000 CONCACAF Gold Cup, 2001 Copa América and the 2007 Copa América.
Andrés Estrada	Colombia	Midfielder	1998–2000	97	3	12	0	He was part of the national squad for the 1997 Copa América and the 1998 FIFA World Cup.
Ever Palacios	Colombia	Defender	1999–2000	52	1	10	1	He was part of the national squad for the 1998 FIFA World Cup.
Elkin Calle	Colombia	Defender	1999–2004; 2012–2014	282	8	4	0	
Tressor Moreno	Colombia	Striker	2000	34	11	32	7	He was part of the national squad for the 2004 Copa América and the 2005 CONCACAF Gold Cup.
Aquivaldo Mosquera	Colombia	Defender	2000–2005	154	13	29	1	He was part of the national squad for the 2011 Copa América.
Felipe Chará	Colombia	Midfielder	2000–2009	233	2	4	0	
Héctor Hurtado	Colombia	Forward	2001–2006	187	30	18	3	He was part of the national squad for the 2000 CONCACAF Gold Cup and the 2005 CONCACAF Gold Cup.
Carlos Alberto Díaz	Colombia	Defender	2001–2010	142	6	0	0	
Juan Camilo Zúñiga	Colombia	Midfielder	2002–2008	123	9	48	1	He was part of the national squad for the 2007 Copa América and the 2011 Copa América.
Edixon Perea	Colombia	Striker	2003–2005	86	42	26	9	He was part of the national squad for the 2004 Copa América and the 2007 Copa América.
Cristian Marrugo	Colombia	Midfielder	2003–2006	94	9	11	0	
Carmelo Valencia	Colombia	Forward	2004; 2006–2008	85	17	3	0	
Hugo Morales	Argentina	Midfielder	2004–2006	54	8	9	2	
Jorge Rojas	Venezuela	Midfielder	2004–2006	57	5	88	4	He was part of the national squad for the 1999 Copa América, 2001 Copa América, 2004 Copa América and the 2007 Copa América.
Humberto Mendoza	Colombia	Defender	2004–2010	202	22	12	2	He was part of the national squad for the 2005 CONCACAF Gold Cup.
Leonardo Fernández	Bolivia	Goalkeeper	2005	8	0	17	0	He was part of the national squad for the 2004 Copa América
Marcelo Ramos	Brazil	Striker	2005–2007	28	4	1	0	
Aldo Ramírez	Colombia	Midfielder	2005–2007; 2009	93	12	24	1	He was part of the national squad for the 2005 CONCACAF Gold Cup.
David Ospina	Colombia	Goalkeeper	2005–2008; 2024–	97	0	36	0	
José Amaya	Colombia	Midfielder	2005–2010	188	4	13	0	He was part of the national squad for the 2004 Copa América.
Vladimir Marín	Colombia	Midfielder	2006	19	1	14	1	He was part of the national squad for the 2007 Copa América.
José Manuel Rey	Venezuela	Defender	2006	19	1	111	11	He was part of the national squad for the 1997 Copa América, 1999 Copa América, 2001 Copa América, 2004 Copa América, 2007 Copa América and the 2011 Copa América.
Oscar Passo	Colombia	Defender	2006–2007	36	4	7	0	He was part of the national squad for the 2005 CONCACAF Gold Cup.
Iván Hurtado	Ecuador	Defender	2007	38	1	168	5	He was part of the national squad for the 1993 Copa América, 1995 Copa América, 1999 Copa América, 2001 Copa América, 2002 CONCACAF Gold Cup, 2002 FIFA World Cup, 2004 Copa América, 2006 FIFA World Cup and the 2007 Copa América.
Jairo Patiño	Colombia	Midfielder	2007; 2009–2011	67	12	35	3	He was part of the national squad for the 2003 CONCACAF Gold Cup, 2003 FIFA Confederations Cup, 2004 Copa América and 2005 CONCACAF Gold Cup.
Estiven Vélez	Colombia	Midfielder	2007–2009	55	1	15	0	
Carlos Rentería	Colombia	Forward	2008–2009; 2011–2012	70	18	1	0	
Walter Moreno	Colombia	Defender	2008–2010	63	3	10	0	
Giovanni Moreno	Colombia	Midfielder	2008–2010	67	34	15	3	
Víctor Ibarbo	Colombia	Forward	2008–2011; 2016	109	6	12	1	He was part of the national squad for the 2014 FIFA World Cup.
Jairo Palomino	Colombia	Midfielder	2008–2011	106	14	3	0	
Gastón Pezzuti	Argentina	Goalkeeper	2009–2012	118	0			
Edwin Cardona	Colombia	Midfielder	2009–2014	104	31	2	0	He was part of the 2015 Copa América and Copa América Centenario
Orlando Berrío	Colombia	Forward	2009–2011; 2013–2016	126	24	4	0	
Dorlan Pabón	Colombia	Forward	2010–2012	71	34	14	3	
Stefan Medina	Colombia	Defender	2010–2014	91	3	8	0	He was part of the national squad for the Copa América Centenario.
Sebastián Pérez Cardona	Colombia	Midfielder	2011–2016	96	2	8	1	
Macnelly Torres	Colombia	Midfielder	2011; 2012–2013; 2015–	79	13	38	3	He was part of the national squad for the 2005 CONCACAF Gold Cup and the 2007 Copa América.
Román Torres	Panama	Defender	2011	36	8	72	11	He was part of the national squad for the 2005 CONCACAF Gold Cup, 2007 CONCACAF Gold Cup, 2009 CONCACAF Gold Cup, 2011 CONCACAF Gold Cup and the 2013 CONCACAF Gold Cup.
Juan Fernando Quintero	Colombia	Midfielder	2012	15	2	11	1	He was part of the national squad for the 2014 FIFA World Cup.
Alexis Henríquez	Colombia	Defender	2012–	57	1	5	0	
Alexander Mejía	Colombia	Midfielder	2012–2014; 2015–2016	122	0	25	0	He was part of the national squad for the 2014 FIFA World Cup.
Óscar Murillo	Colombia	Defender	2012–2015	84	15	6	0	
Farid Díaz	Colombia	Defender	2012–2017	146	2	13	0	He was part of the national squad for the Copa América Centenario.
Luis Fernando Mosquera	Colombia	Forward	2012–2013	38	14	3	1	
Francisco Nájera	Colombia	Defender	2012–2017	116	10	1	0	
Alejandro Bernal	Colombia	Defender	2012–2017	123	5	0	0	
Fernando Uribe	Colombia	Forward	2012–2015	51	15	2	0	
Juan David Valencia	Colombia	Defender	2012–2015	102	14	5	0	
Diego Arias	Colombia	Midfielder	2012–	28	1	1	0	
Neco Martínez	Colombia	Goalkeeper	2012–2016	66	0	8	1	He was part of the national squad for the 2003 FIFA Confederations Cup, 2005 CONCACAF Gold Cup and the 2011 Copa América.
Alejandro Guerra	Venezuela	Defender	2014–2016	36	10	61	4	He was part of the national squad for the 2007 Copa América.
Marlos Moreno	Colombia	Forward	2014–2016	27	6	8	1	He was part of the national squad for the Copa América Centenario.
Miguel Borja	Colombia	Forward	2016	27	17	3	0	
