= 1989 Intercontinental Cup =

Milan	Atlético Nacional
(Italy)	(Colombia)
1	0
- After extra time
- Date: 17 December 1989
- Venue: National Stadium, Tokyo
- Man of the Match: Alberico Evani (Milan)
- Referee: Erik Fredriksson (Sweden)
- Attendance: 60,228

The 1989 Intercontinental Cup was an association football match played on 17 December 1989 between Milan of Italy, winners of the 1988–89 European Cup, and Atlético Nacional of Colombia, winners of the 1989 Copa Libertadores. The match was played at the neutral venue of the National Stadium in Tokyo in front of 60,228 fans. Alberico Evani was named as man of the match.

== Match details ==
1989 Intercontinental Cup
17 December 1989
12:00

Milan (Italy)	1–0 (a.e.t.)	(Colombia) Atlético Nacional
Evani 119'	Report

National Stadium, Tokyo
Attendance: 60,228
Referee: Erik Fredriksson (Sweden)

Milan	Atlético Nacional

GK	1	(Italy) Giovanni Galli
RB	2	(Italy) Mauro Tassotti
CB	5	(Italy) Alessandro Costacurta
CB	6	(Italy) Franco Baresi (c)
LB	3	(Italy) Paolo Maldini
CM	8	(Netherlands) Frank Rijkaard
RM	4	(Italy) Diego Fuser	(substituted off) 65'
LM	7	(Italy) Roberto Donadoni
CM	10	(Italy) Carlo Ancelotti
CF	9	(Netherlands) Marco van Basten
CF	11	(Italy) Daniele Massaro	(substituted off) 70'
Substitutes:
GK	12	(Italy) Andrea Pazzagli
DF	13	(Italy) Stefano Carobbi
MF	14	(Italy) Alberico Evani	(substituted on) 65'
MF	15	(Italy) Giovanni Stroppa
FW	16	(Italy) Marco Simone	(substituted on) 70'
Manager:
(Italy) Arrigo Sacchi

GK	1	(Colombia) René Higuita
DF	4	(Colombia) Luis F. Herrera
DF	2	(Colombia) Andrés Escobar
DF	3	(Colombia) Gabriel Gómez
DF	5	(Colombia) Geovanis Cassiani
MF	8	(Colombia) Leonel Álvarez
MF	6	(Colombia) José Ricardo Pérez
MF	7	(Colombia) Jaime Arango	(substituted off) 46'
MF	10	(Colombia) Alexis García (c)
FW	9	(Colombia) Níver Arboleda	(substituted off) 46'
FW	11	(Colombia) John Jairo Tréllez
Substitutes:
DF	12	(Colombia) León Villa
FW	13	(Colombia) Felipe Pérez Urrea
DF	14	(Colombia) Luis Fernando Suárez
MF	15	(Colombia) Gustavo Restrepo	(substituted on) 46'
FW	16	(Colombia) Albeiro Usuriaga	(substituted on) 46'
Manager:
(Colombia) Francisco Maturana

== See also ==
- 1988–89 European Cup
- 1989 Copa Libertadores
- A.C. Milan in European football
- Atlético Nacional in international tournaments
