= Óscar Cortés =

Óscar Cortés may refer to:

- Óscar Cortés (footballer, born 1968), Colombian football defender
- Óscar Cortés (footballer, born 2003), Colombian football midfielder for Huracán
