= Juan Diego Castillo =

Colombian footballer (born 2003)

Personal information
- Full name: Juan Diego Castillo Reyes
- Date of birth: 13 January 2003 (age 23)
- Place of birth: Cali, Colombia
- Height: 1.92 m (6 ft 4 in)
- Position: Goalkeeper

Team information
- Current team: Vitória de Guimarães
- Number: 25

Youth career
- Cardozo
- Sarmiento Lora
- 2019: Fortaleza C.E.I.F.

Senior career*
Years	Team	Apps	(Gls)
2019–2025	Fortaleza C.E.I.F.	105	(0)
2025–	Vitória de Guimarães	15	(0)

International career
2017	Colombia U15	1	(0)
2019	Colombia U17	2	(0)
2021	Colombia U19	2	(0)
2022–2023	Colombia U20	8	(0)
2023	Colombia U23	1	(0)
- * Club domestic league appearances and goals as of 25 May 2026

Juan Diego Castillo Reyes (born 13 January 2003) is a Colombian professional footballer who currently plays as a goalkeeper for Primeira Liga club Vitória de Guimarães.

== Club career ==
Castillo began his career with a club named "Cardozo" and the Escuela Carlos Sarmiento Lora, before joining Fortaleza C.E.I.F. at the age of sixteen. In March 2021, following his first full season with the Fortaleza first team, he was named by the CIES Football Observatory as one of the most promising young footballers in the world. In pre-season ahead of the 2023 season, he gained national attention after performing a "scorpion kick" save, popularised by compatriot René Higuita.

On 30 June 2025, Castillo joined Portuguese Primeira Liga club Vitória de Guimarães on a four-year contract. On 10 January 2026, Castillo was on the bench in the Portuguese Taça da Liga final against Braga in which Vitória Guimarães won 2–1.

== International career ==
Castillo has represented Colombia at under-15, under-17 and under-20 level. He was called up to the under-20 squad in March 2023, but found himself culpable for two mistakes leading to goals in the 2–0 friendly loss to Wales. He was called up again ahead of the 2023 FIFA U-20 World Cup, stating that the opportunity was a "dream come true".

== Honours ==
Vitória SC

- Taça da Liga: 2025–26

== Personal life ==
He is the nephew of Bréiner Castillo.

== Career statistics ==
=== Club ===
As of match played 8 November 2025

Appearances and goals by club, season and competition
Club	Season	League			National cup (Note: Includes Copa Colombia)		Continental		Other		Total	
Club	Season	Division	Apps	Goals	Apps	Goals	Apps	Goals	Apps	Goals	Apps	Goals
Fortaleza C.E.I.F.	2020	Categoría Primera B	15	0	3	0	—		—		18	0
Fortaleza C.E.I.F.	2021	Categoría Primera B	23	0	0	0	—		—		23	0
Fortaleza C.E.I.F.	2022	Categoría Primera B	4	0	2	0	—		—		6	0
Fortaleza C.E.I.F.	2023	Categoría Primera B	19	0	0	0	—		—		19	0
Fortaleza C.E.I.F.	2024	Categoría Primera A	35	0	0	0	—		—		35	0
Fortaleza C.E.I.F.	2025	Categoría Primera A	9	0	2	0	—		—		11	0
Fortaleza C.E.I.F.	Total		105	0	7	0	—		—		112	0
Vitória de Guimarães	2025–26	Primeira Liga	7	0	0	0	—		0	0	7	0
Career total			112	0	7	0	0	0	0	0	119	0
