= Gildardo Gómez =

Colombian footballer (born 1963)

Personal information
- Full name: Gildardo Biderman Gómez Monsálvez
- Date of birth: 13 October 1963 (age 63)
- Place of birth: Medellín, Colombia
- Height: 1.76 m (5 ft 9 in)
- Position: Defender

Senior career*
Years	Team	Apps	(Gls)
1984–1986	Independiente Medellin	148	(5)
1987	Millonarios	15	(0)
1988–1990	Atlético Nacional	82	(1)
1991–1992	Independiente Medellin	31	(1)
1993	Atlético Nacional	41	(0)
Total		317	(7)

International career
1984–1994	Colombia	22	(0)
- * Club domestic league appearances and goals

Gildardo Biderman Gómez Monsálvez (born 13 October 1963, Medellín) is a Colombian former footballer who played as defender specially in Atlético Nacional, where he won Copa Libertadores title, and Independiente Medellín. He was in the same generation from other good players in his position like León Villa and Luis Fernando Herrera. Gómez Monsálvez played 1990 FIFA World Cup in Italy.

== Sources ==
- Gildardo Gómez at National-Football-Teams.com
