= Achito Vivas =

Colombian footballer (1934–2026)

Personal information
- Full name: Adelmo Achito Vivas
- Date of birth: 1 March 1934
- Place of birth: Buenaventura, Colombia
- Date of death: 24 July 2026 (aged 92)
- Place of death: Cali, Colombia
- Position: Goalkeeper

Senior career*
Years	Team	Apps	(Gls)
1958–1959	Atlético Nacional		
1959–1964	Deportivo Pereira		
1965	Deportes Quindío		
1966	Atlético Junior		
1967–1968	Deportivo Pereira		
1969	Deportes Tolima		
1969	Once Caldas		
1970	Deportivo Pereira		

International career
1963	Colombia	4	(0)
- * Club domestic league appearances and goals

Adelmo Achito Vivas (1 March 1934 – 23 July 2026) was a Colombian footballer who played as a goalkeeper. He competed for the Colombia national team at the 1962 FIFA World Cup, which was held in Chile.

Vivas spent most of his career playing for Deportivo Pereira, appearing in 220 league matches for the club.

Vivas died from kidney failure at a hospital in Cali, Colombia, on 23 July 2026, at the age of 92.
