= Bréiner Castillo =

Colombian footballer (born 1978)

Personal information
- Full name: Bréiner Clemente Castillo Caicedo
- Date of birth: May 5, 1978 (age 48)
- Place of birth: Barbacoas, Colombia
- Height: 1.85 m (6 ft 1 in)
- Position: Goalkeeper

Youth career
- Deportivo Cali

Senior career*
Years	Team	Apps	(Gls)
1997–2002	Deportivo Cali	?	(?)
2002	Millonarios	5	(0)
2003–2004	Deportivo Cali	50	(0)
2005	Aucas	18	(0)
2005–2006	Atlético Nacional	1	(0)
2006–2010	Deportivo Cali	12	(0)
2008–2010	→ Deportes Tolima (loan)	87	(0)
2010–2012	Independiente Medellín	65	(0)
2012	Real Cartagena	14	(0)
2013	Deportivo Táchira	32	(0)
2014	Boyacá Chicó	18	(0)
2014–2016	Envigado	68	(0)
2017–2018	Atlético Huila	36	(0)

International career
2005–2010	Colombia	4	(0)
- * Club domestic league appearances and goals as of 11 January 2017

Bréiner Clemente Castillo Caicedo (born May 5, 1978) is a Colombian goalkeeper currently playing for Boyacá Chicó.

Castillo played professionally for 18 seasons, making appearances for Deportivo Cali, Millonarios, Nacional, Deportes Tolima, Medellín, Real Cartagena, Boyacá Chicó, S.D. Aucas (Ecuador) and Deportivo Táchira F.C. (Venezuela). He was also a member of the Senior Colombia squad during the Copa America 2004. He has been called to national team in 2010.
