= Víctor Marulanda =

Colombian footballer (born 1971)

Víctor Hugo Marulanda Velásquez (born 3 February 1971 in Medellín) is a retired male football defender from Colombia.

== Career ==
Marulanda was a university student while playing for Atlético Nacional. He played for the Colombia national football team at the 1992 Summer Olympics in Barcelona, Spain, wearing the #5 jersey. After retiring from football, Victor Marulanda became president of Atlético Nacional, position he held until he was dismissed from his charge in 2010.
