= Jaime Silva (footballer) =

Colombian footballer (1935-2003)

Personal information
- Full name: Jaime Silva Gómez
- Date of birth: October 10, 1935
- Place of birth: Colombia
- Date of death: April 25, 2003 (aged 67)

International career
Years	Team	Apps	(Gls)
- Colombia

Jaime Silva Gómez (10 October 1935 – 25 April 2003) was a Colombian footballer. He competed for the Colombia national football team at the 1962 FIFA World Cup which was held in Chile.

== Career ==
Born in Bogotá, Silva played club football for Santa Fe, Deportivo Cali and Deportes Tolima. After he finishing playing football, he managed Cúcuta Deportivo and the Colombia national under-20 football team at the 1983 South American Youth Championship in Bolivia.
