= Diego Osorio =

Colombian footballer (born 1970)

Personal information
- Full name: Diego Leon Osorio Rendón
- Date of birth: 21 July 1970 (age 56)
- Place of birth: Medellín, Colombia
- Position: Defender

Senior career*
Years	Team	Apps	(Gls)
1989–1990	Independiente Medellín		
1991–1995	Atlético Nacional		
1996	Santa Fe		
1997–1998	Atlético Nacional		

International career
1991–1995	Colombia	17	(0)
- * Club domestic league appearances and goals

Diego Osorio (born 21 July 1970) is a Colombian former footballer.

== Club career ==
Osorio began his professional career in Independiente Medellín, before moving to Atlético Nacional where he would spend most of his playing career.

== International career ==
Osorio made 17 appearances for the senior Colombia national football team from 1991 to 1995. He also played at the 1992 Summer Olympics.

Osorio also played for Colombia at the 1989 FIFA U-16 World Championship.

== Arrest ==
Osorio was arrested for cocaine possession and trafficking in Miami, Florida, in August 2002. Osorio was arrested for cocaine possession and trafficking in Bogotá, Colombia, in October 2016.
