= Carlos Aponte =

Colombian footballer (1939–2008)

Personal information
- Full name: Carlos Aponte Benítez
- Date of birth: January 24, 1939
- Place of birth: Colombia
- Date of death: August 1, 2008 (aged 69)

International career
Years	Team	Apps	(Gls)
- Colombia

Carlos Aponte Benítez (Tunja, January 24, 1939 – August 1, 2008) was a Colombian footballer. He competed for the Colombia national football team at the 1962 FIFA World Cup which was held in Chile.

== Career ==
Aponte played club football for Santa Fe, Unión Magdalena and Deportes Tolima. In 17 years with Santa Fe, he won three Colombian league titles.
