= James Mina =

Colombian footballer (born 1954)

Personal information
- Date of birth: 17 July 1954 (age 72)
- Position: Goalkeeper

International career
| Years | Team | Apps | (Gls) |
| 1983 | Colombia | 3 | (0) |

James Mina (born 17 July 1954) is a Colombian footballer. He played in three matches for the Colombia national football team in 1983. He was also part of Colombia's squad for the 1979 Copa América tournament.
