= Luis Fajardo (footballer) =

Colombian footballer (born 1963)

Personal information
- Full name: Luis Alfonso Fajardo Posada
- Date of birth: 18 June 1963 (age 63)
- Place of birth: Colombia
- Height: 1.70 m (5 ft 7 in)
- Position: Midfielder

Youth career
- 1983: Atlético Nacional

Senior career*
| Years | Team | Apps | (Gls) |
| 1984–1992 | Atlético Nacional | 169 | (14) |
| 1993 | Atlético Huila | 36 | (2) |
| 1994–1995 | Independiente Medellín | 23 | (0) |
| Total | | 228 | (16) |

International career
| 1989–1990 | Colombia | 15 | (1) |
- * Club domestic league appearances and goals

Luis Alfonso "El Bendito" Fajardo Posada (born 18 June 1963) is a retired Colombian footballer. He was chosen to play for Colombia in the 1990 FIFA World Cup in Italy by his former Atlético Nacional manager Francisco Maturana. He's now a chairman of Deportivo Rionegro, a second division Colombian team.

== Career ==
Fajardo played club football for Atlético Nacional, Independiente Medellín and Envigado Fútbol Club before retiring in 1996. He won the Colombian league with Nacional in 1991.

== Career statistics ==
=== International ===
Appearances and goals by national team and year
| National team | Year | Apps | Goals |
|---|---|---|---|
| Colombia | 1989 | 6 | 0 |
| Colombia | 1990 | 9 | 1 |
| Total | | 15 | 1 |

Scores and results list Colombia's goal tally first, score Fajardo indicates score after each Stewart goal.

List of international goals scored by Luis Fajardo
| No. | Date | Venue | Opponent | Score | Result | Competition |
|---|---|---|---|---|---|---|
| 1 | 8 January 1990 | Miami Orange Bowl, Miami, United States | United States | 1–1 | 1–1 (9–8 p) | 1990 Marlboro Cup |
