= Óscar Cortés (footballer, born 1968) =

Colombian footballer

Óscar Fernando Cortés
Personal information
- Full name: Óscar Fernando Cortés Corredor
- Date of birth: 19 October 1968 (age 58)
- Place of birth: Bogotá, Colombia
- Height: 1.78 m (5 ft 10 in)
- Position: Defender

Senior career*
Years	Team	Apps	(Gls)
1990–1994	Millonarios		
1996–2003	Millonarios		

International career
1993–1994	Colombia	3	(0)
- * Club domestic league appearances and goals

Óscar Fernando Cortés Corredor (born 19 October 1968) is a Colombian retired footballer.

He played mostly for Millonarios. He also played for the Colombia national football team and was a participant at the 1994 FIFA World Cup.

== Honours ==
Season	Team	Title
1990	Millonarios	Colombian League
1996	Millonarios	Colombian League
