= José Santa =

Colombian footballer (born 1970)

José Fernando Santa Robledo (born September 12, 1970) is a retired football defender who played at international level for Colombia. He played two matches at the 1998 FIFA World Cup, and his club at that time was Atlético Nacional. He also appeared at the 1992 Summer Olympics.

== Career ==
Born in Pereira, Risaralda, Santa was the first person Risaralda Department to play in a FIFA World Cup.

Santa made 28 appearances for the Colombia national football team from 1995 to 1998.
