= Luis Carlos Perea =

Colombian footballer (born 1963)

Personal information
- Full name: Luis Carlos Perea
- Date of birth: 29 December 1963 (age 62)
- Place of birth: Turbo, Colombia
- Height: 1.81 m (5 ft 11 in)
- Position: Centre-back

Senior career*
Years	Team	Apps	(Gls)
1983–1986	Independiente Medellín	101	(7)
1987–1990	Atlético Nacional	76	(6)
1991–1993	Independiente Medellín	94	(3)
1994	Atlético Junior	1	(0)
1994–1995	Toros Neza	35	(3)
1996	Deportes Tolima		
1997–1998	Atlético Nacional		
Total		307	(19)

International career
1987–1994	Colombia	78	(2)
- * Club domestic league appearances and goals

Luis Carlos "Coroncoro" Perea (born 29 December 1963) is a Colombian former professional footballer who played as a central defender.

== Club career ==
Perea was born in Turbo. During his career he played mainly with Independiente Medellín, where he would debut in 1983, and Atlético Nacional, but also had brief spells with Atlético Junior and Deportes Tolima.

Abroad, Perea represented Toros Neza in Mexico, and he won the 1989 Copa Libertadores with Nacional. He moved to the United States in 1999, intending to sign with the Miami Fusion or Tampa Bay Mutiny; he did not join either club and retired from playing, but began working as a player development coach at the Miami Strike Force. He is also a coach at pathway miami.

== International career ==
Over seven years, Perea played 78 games and scored two goals for the Colombia national team. This included six appearances at the 1990 and the 1994 FIFA World Cups combined.

Perea participated in four Copa América finals, and netted his first international goal in the 1993 Copa América, in the 88th minute of the quarter-final match against Uruguay (1–1 after 120 minutes, penalty shootout win).

=== International goals ===
Scores and results list Colombia's goal tally first, score column indicates score after each Perea goal.

List of international goals scored by Luis Carlos Perea
No.	Date	Venue	Opponent	Score	Result	Competition
1	30 March 1988	Estadio Centenario, Armenia, Colombia	Canada	1–0	3–0	Friendly
2	26 June 1993	Monumental Isidro Romero Carbo, Guayaquil, Ecuador	Uruguay	1–1	1–1	1993 Copa América

== Personal life ==
Perea was named in a list of the top 100 prominent Latinos living in Miami. His son, Luis Alberto, was also a footballer. A forward, he played for a host of clubs in several countries.
