= Jairo Arias =

Colombian footballer (1938–2023)

Personal information
- Full name: Jairo Arias Serna
- Date of birth: November 29, 1936
- Place of birth: Colombia
- Date of death: October 13, 2023 (aged 86)
- Place of death: Houston, Texas, U.S.
- Height: 1.73 m (5 ft 8 in)
- Position: Forward

Senior career*
| Years | Team | Apps | (Gls) |
| 1957–1959 | Atlético Nacional | 82 | (21) |
| 1960 | Independiente Santa Fe | 15 | (2) |
| 1961–1962 | Atlético Nacional | 72 | (14) |
| 1963–1964 | Once Caldas | 57 | (4) |
| 1964 | Unión Magdalena | 21 | (0) |
| 1965 | Once Caldas | 1 | (0) |
| Total | | 248 | (41) |

International career
| 1962–1963 | Colombia | 4 | (0) |
- * Club domestic league appearances and goals as of April 16, 2013

Jairo Arias Serna (2 November 1938 – 13 October 2023) was a Colombian footballer. He was a member of the Colombia national football team at the 1962 FIFA World Cup which was held in Chile. Arias died in Houston, Texas on 13 October 2023, at the age of 84.
