= Ignacio Calle =

Colombian footballer (1931–1982)

Personal information
- Full name: Ignacio Calle Tobón
- Date of birth: 21 August 1931
- Date of death: 24 February 1982 (aged 50)
- Place of death: Medellín, Colombia
- Height: 1.83 m (6 ft 0 in)
- Position: Right-back

Senior career*
| Years | Team | Apps | (Gls) |
| 1951–1965 | Atlético Nacional | 346 | (0) |

International career
| 1954–1962 | Colombia | 5 | (0) |
- * Club domestic league appearances and goals

Ignacio Calle Tobón (21 August 1931 – 24 February 1982) was a Colombian footballer who played as a right-back. He was part of the squad for the Colombia national team at the 1962 FIFA World Cup which was held in Chile after playing in qualification games for the 1958 and 1962 tournament.

== Career ==
Calle played all his career for Atlético Nacional. He was also a successful manager for Santa Fe and América de Cali.
