= Jorge Hugo Fernández =

Argentine footballer

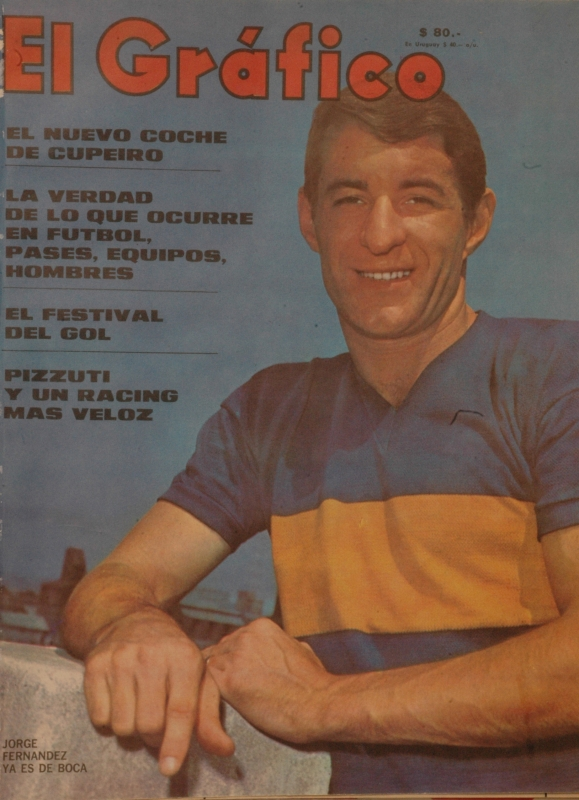

Personal information
- Date of birth: 24 February 1942 (age 84)
- Position: Forward

International career
| Years | Team | Apps | (Gls) |
| 1963–1967 | Argentina | 4 | (1) |

Jorge Hugo Fernández (born 24 February 1942) is an Argentine former footballer. He played in four matches for the Argentina national football team from 1963 to 1967. He was also part of Argentina's squad for the 1963 South American Championship.
