= José Ricardo Pérez =

Colombian footballer (born 1963)

Personal information
- Full name: José Ricardo Pérez Morales
- Date of birth: 24 October 1963 (age 63)
- Place of birth: Manizales, Colombia
- Height: 1.74 m (5 ft 9 in)
- Position: Defender

Senior career*
Years	Team	Apps	(Gls)
1981–1986	Once Caldas	124	(19)
1987	Atlético Junior		
1987–1992	Atlético Nacional	151	(7)
1993–1994	Santa Fe	40	(0)
1995–1996	Independiente Medellín	4	(0)

International career
1987–1997	Colombia	19	(1)

Managerial career
- 2008–2009: Inter Anzoátegui
- 2014–: Boyacá Chicó
- * Club domestic league appearances and goals

José Ricardo Pérez Morales (born 24 October 1963) is a Colombian football defender who played for Colombia in the 1990 FIFA World Cup. He also played for Once Caldas and Atlético Nacional. Currently, he is coaching Colombian club Boyacá Chicó.
