= Atlético Nacional =

Association football club in Colombia

- Full name: Atlético Nacional S. A.
- Nicknames: Los Verdolagas (The Purslanes); El Verde (The Green); Rey de Copas (King of Cups); El Verde de la Montaña (The Green from the Mountain); El Verde Paisa (The Paisa Green); El Siempre Verde (The Evergreen)
- Founded: 7 March 1947; 79 years ago
- Ground: Atanasio Girardot
- Capacity: 44,826
- Owner: Organización Ardila Lülle
- President: Sebastián Arango Botero
- Head coach: Lucas González
- League: Categoría Primera A
- 2025: Primera A, 4th of 20
- Website: www.atlnacional.com.co
| Home colours | Away colours | Third colours |

Club Atlético Nacional, best known as Atlético Nacional, or simply Nacional, is a Colombian professional football club based in Medellín. The club is one of only three clubs to have played in every first division tournament in the country's history, the other two being Millonarios and Santa Fe.

Atlético Nacional was founded in 1947 as Club Atlético Municipal de Medellín by Luis Alberto Villegas López, a former president of the football league of Antioquia. The team adopted its current name in 1950. The current owner, Organización Ardila Lülle, officially acquired the team in 1996. According to CONMEBOL, Atlético Nacional is the club with the largest fan following in Colombia, with more than 15 million fans.

Atlético Nacional plays its home games at the Atanasio Girardot stadium, which has a capacity of 40,043. They share the stadium with their local rivals, Independiente Medellín. The teams face each other in a local derby known as El Clásico Paisa, which is considered one of the most important local derbies in the country. Atlético Nacional also has rivalries with Millonarios and América de Cali, two of the most important rivalries in Colombian football and South America.

Considered to be one of the strongest clubs from Colombia, it is one of the most consistent clubs in the country. Nacional is the only Colombian club that has won the two domestic short-format tournaments in a single year, Apertura and Finalización, since the format was established in 2002, winning the titles of the 2007 and 2013 seasons. The club has won 18 league championships, eight Copa Colombia and four Superliga Colombiana titles, for a total of 30 domestic titles, making it the most successful team within Colombia. It was also the first Colombian club to win the Copa Libertadores in 1989 and, after winning the title again in 2016, the most successful Colombian side in that tournament. It also has the most international titles of any Colombian club, having also won the Copa Merconorte twice, the Copa Interamericana twice, and the Recopa Sudamericana once, for a total of seven international trophies and 37 overall.

In 2016, Atlético Nacional was ranked by IFFHS as the best football club in the world, becoming the first South American club, and the first outside Europe, to receive such an honor in that ranking. It ranks 58th in the world ranking of the best clubs of all time according to the IFFHS, being the second-best-ranked Colombian team on the list. It is also ranked as the second-best Colombian club of the 20th century and as the best Colombian club so far in the 21st century. Nacional is also credited as the best Colombian team in CONMEBOL club tournaments and ranks 17th in the official club ranking of the Copa Libertadores.

As of 1 January 2021, Atlético Nacional had 9.39 million followers on social media, making it the most-followed club in Colombia and one of the most-followed clubs in South America.

== History ==
Atlético Nacional was founded as Club Atlético Municipal de Medellín on 7 March 1947 by a partnership led by Luis Alberto Villegas López, former president of the football league of Antioquia. The club was created to promote sports in the city, especially football and basketball. It was based on Unión Indulana Foot-Ball Club, an amateur club from the Liga Antioqueña de Fútbol, the local amateur football league. Officially, the founding members were: Luis Alberto Villegas Lopera, Jorge Osorio, Alberto Eastman, Jaime Restrepo, Gilberto Molina, Raúl Zapata Lotero, Jorge Gómez Jaramillo, Arturo Torres Posada and Julio Ortiz.

Atlético Nacional joined the professional league for its first edition in 1948. For that tournament, each club had to pay a fee of 1,000 pesos (at that time, approximately US$1,050). Atlético Nacional played the first match of the history of the tournament, a 2–0 victory over Universidad. The tournament had ten participants that season and Atlético Nacional was 6th with seven victories, four draws and seven defeats.

Atlético Municipal changed to its current name, Atlético Nacional, for the 1951 season. The name change was made as a way to reflect the main philosophy of the club: to encourage the national sportsmanship. That philosophy was also reflected in the club's policy of signing only national players, which held special meaning during Colombia's El Dorado period, a time when most Colombian clubs were aggressively pursuing foreigners. It was not until 1953 that the club signed their first foreign player, Argentine Atilio Miotti.

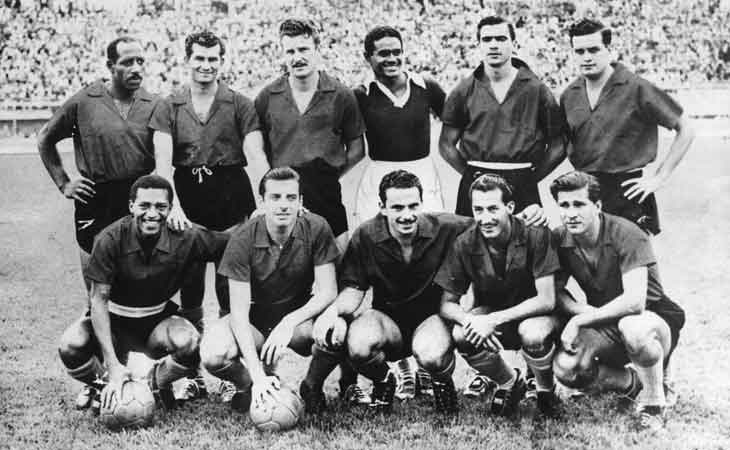
The squad that won the club's first league title in 1954.

Atlético Nacional won its first league title in 1954. Manager Fernando Paternoster (who managed the team from 1948 to 1951 and from 1954 to 1957) guided the team through a season in which they lost just once (to Boca Juniors de Cali). The star was Argentine striker Carlos Gambina, who led the league with 21 goals.

Economic troubles plagued the team in the late 1950s, and during 1958 the club was briefly forced to merge with crosstown rivals Independiente Medellín. These financial problems and occasional returns to the club's policy of only signing Colombian players hampered results, and the club failed to win another title for nineteen years.

The drought was finally broken in 1973. The revival had actually started after the 1970 season, with the hiring of manager José Curti and the signing of midfielder Jorge Hugo Fernández. In 1971, Nacional won the Apertura title and only narrowly lost the national championship to Santa Fe (they fell 3–2 in a second replay of a bitterly fought championship playoff). Following a strong finish in 1972, Nacional won its second league title in 1973. They qualified for the final stage by winning the Torneo Finalización with 34 points, then finished first in a three-way round robin against Millonarios and Deportivo Cali. This championship was followed up by a runner-up finish in 1974.

1976 saw a new era for the club begin, with the hiring of Argentine manager Osvaldo Zubeldia. With his strong emphasis on conditioning and physical play, Zubeldia was able to manage the club to two further titles, 1976 and 1981, as well as regular finishes towards the top of the table. During the Zubeldia era, the heart of the team was César Cueto, central midfielder and team captain from 1979 to 1983. During the 1981 championship season, Cueto was voted the league's player of the year. This successful era ended with Zubeldia's sudden death of a heart attack in January 1982. Nacional remained a power in Colombia, but the death of their manager, the departure of Cueto, and the rise of América de Cali (the Red Devils won five straight championships in the 1980s) left its fans dissatisfied, and began a decade-long trophy drought.

Determined to break their stranglehold, the club made a significant change in 1987. First, they appointed Francisco Maturana as manager. A regular in the team's defense during the 1970s, Maturana was considered a rising star in Colombian football management and had just been named manager of the national team. Maturana was thus simultaneously trying to lead the club to a domestic title and assemble a national side that could qualify for the World Cup. The two goals were complementary; Atlético Nacional's traditional preference for Colombians over foreigners made them a natural base for Maturana to build his national team upon. However, there was also another development of more questionable legality; in the 1980s, Nacional was linked to the Medellín Cartel. Its leader, Pablo Escobar, who was also the most prominent of Colombia's drug lords, was a fan of both football and betting, and also wanted to invest in a local club and find a way to launder his drug money. Although Escobar never took a public role, the money he poured into the club made a major impact. In Maturana's words, "The introduction of drug money into soccer allowed us to bring in great foreign players. It also kept our best players from leaving. Our level of play took off. People saw our situation and said Pablo was involved. But they couldn't prove it".

Regardless of how the club was assembled, by 1987 they had a strong roster featuring a collection of Colombian internationals. In goal was René Higuita, a keeper known for his tendency to leave his area. In defense they had Andrés Escobar and veteran Luis Fernando Herrera. The midfield featured Leonel Álvarez (capped over 100 times for Colombia) and Alexis García (team captain and Medellín native). In the attack, the club could count on John Jairo Tréllez, one of the country's most prolific goal-scorers. This lineup was good enough to finish second in both the Apertura and Finalización, qualifying for the championship round, in which they finished fourth.

The 1988 season was even better, as the club qualified for the championship round again, finishing as runners-up behind Millonarios. That result was good enough to qualify the team for the 1989 Copa Libertadores. The entire focus of the 1989 campaign was on the Copa Libertadores, which Atlético Nacional hoped to become the first Colombian club to win the competition. In the group stage, Los Verdolagas were placed with fellow Colombian side Millonarios, as well as Ecuadorian clubs Deportivo Quito and Emelec. Two wins and three draws allowed Nacional to advance out of the group stages for the first time in five attempts. In the round of 16, they defeated Racing Club of Argentina by an aggregate score of 3–2. That sent them into the quarterfinals for an all-Colombian matchup with Millonarios, their group stage opponent. Nacional won the first leg 1–0, then held out for a 1–1 draw in a controversial match in Bogotá, advancing to the semifinals. In the semifinals the team faced Danubio of Uruguay. The away match ended in a 0–0 draw, but four goals from Albeiro Usuriaga sparked a 6–0 rout in the return match to send the club into the finals. In the finals, they faced Paraguay's Olimpia, who had already played two Libertadores finals in their history. The first leg, played in Asunción, saw Olimpia grab a 2–0 win. Nacional answered in the second leg (played in Bogotá on the grounds that the Estadio Atanasio Girardot in Medellín was too small) with a 2–0 win of their own. The tie went into penalty kicks, where Nacional won 5–4, giving the club its first Copa Libertadores title, while becoming the first Colombian club to win the competition as well.

Whilst the club hit that milestone abroad, the domestic league season was cancelled due to the assassination of referee Álvaro Ortega on 1 October after a match between Independiente Medellin and America de Cali. Although Pablo Escobar did not murder the referee himself, it is believed that one of Escobar's hitmen did. Later that month, the team played the Supercopa Libertadores and were eliminated in the quarterfinals by Independiente.

1989 Intercontinental Cup starting lineup

On 17 December, Nacional played the 1989 Intercontinental Cup against Milan, champion of the 1988–89 European Cup. The result was a 1–0 defeat with a 119-minute free kick goal from Alberigo Evani. As champion of the Copa Libertadores, Nacional also played the 1989 Copa Interamericana against Pumas UNAM, winner of the 1989 CONCACAF Champions' Cup. It was played over two legs, and Nacional won it with an aggregate score of 6–1. They also played the 1990 Recopa Sudamericana against Boca Juniors, which finished in a 1–0 defeat.

The involvement of Pablo Escobar in the club remained strong. Some referees were threatened in the league and even in the Copa Libertadores, for which CONMEBOL banned Colombian clubs from the 1990 Copa Libertadores, with the exception of Nacional who was admitted as champion of the previous edition. However, the team had to play its home matches in Chile. Juan Daniel Cardellino, an Uruguayan referee, confessed to receiving death threats and $20,000 during the 1990 Copa Libertadores match between Nacional and Vasco da Gama. Nacional had won the match 2–0, but the result was annulled. A replay was ordered to be played in Santiago, and Nacional won 1–0. However, all Colombian clubs were banned from playing at their home venues for the 1991 Copa Libertadores as a result. Nacional were later eliminated in the semi-finals by their rival in the 1989 Libertadores final: Olimpia. Nacional was banned from playing the Supercopa Libertadores in 1990 and 1991 due to the incidents in the match against Vasco da Gama. They returned for the 1992 edition, but performed very badly, and were eliminated in the first round with a humiliating 8–0 defeat to Cruzeiro.

In the 1991 Libertadores, Nacional were once again eliminated in the semi-finals by Olimpia, while in that same year they won their fifth Primera A title after placing first in the final round against América, Junior and Santa Fe. The Verdolagas won two more domestic titles in the 1990s: in 1994 they won their sixth league title after topping the championship round against Millonarios, América, and Independiente Medellín, whilst in 1999 they won their seventh title after beating América on penalties in the final.

In 1995, Nacional made the Copa Libertadores finals again, losing to Gremio. In 1996, Atlético Nacional was bought by the Organización Ardila Lülle, becoming the first Colombian football club with corporate backing. In 2002, Nacional made the Copa Sudamericana finals, losing to Argentine club San Lorenzo 4–0 on aggregate.

Nacional left again the practise of a team with no foreign players in 2004, when the team signed the Venezuelan winger Jorge Rojas and the Argentine midfielder Hugo Morales. That season, Nacional made the final in both the Apertura and Finalización tournaments, but lost to rivals Independiente Medellín and Junior, respectively. In 2007, Nacional won both tournaments of the year: in the Apertura they beat Atlético Huila, and in the Finalización, they defeated La Equidad in the finals.

In 2009, Nacional played the worst season of its history, where the team placed 17th in the Torneo Apertura with three victories in eighteen matches. In the Torneo Finalización, the team did a lot better, finishing seventh in the regular season and qualifying to the playoffs, where they finished second and failed to qualify for the finals.

In 2011, Atlético Nacional won their eleventh championship after beating La Equidad over two legs in the finals of the Apertura tournament, but in the Finalización, Nacional finished 12th in the Torneo Apertura and failed to qualify to the next round, with the same thing occurring in the 2012 Apertura. During the Apertura, they were knocked out by Vélez Sársfield in the Copa Libertadores round of 16. Due to this, the team signed manager Juan Carlos Osorio in May, even though Osorio was coming off a poor spell with his previous club Puebla, winning only twice in eleven matches. For the Torneo Finalización, Nacional placed fifth and qualified to the next round. The team was unable to advance to the finals, placing second in their group behind city rivals Independiente Medellín. However, Nacional won its first Copa Colombia title that year, beating Deportivo Pasto with an aggregate score of 2–0. The team also won the first edition of the Superliga Colombiana, defeating Junior with an aggregate score of 6–1.

The next year, Nacional won for the second time the two tournaments of the league, Apertura and Finalización. In the Apertura, Nacional beat Santa Fe in the finals. In the Finalización, they defeated Deportivo Cali. In total, the team got 29 victories, 16 draws and 7 defeats that year. The team also won its second Copa Colombia title defeating Millonarios with an aggregate score of 3–2, completing a domestic double in the process.

Nacional began the 2014 season with the 2014 Superliga Colombiana, where the team lost 4–3 on penalties to Deportivo Cali after a 2–2 draw on aggregate. In the 2014 Copa Libertadores, Nacional was eliminated in the quarterfinals by Defensor Sporting 3–0 on aggregate. Three days later, they lost 1–0 to Junior in the first leg of the finals. However they came back in dramatic fashion in the second leg; with the score tied at 1–1 Junior was just minutes away from lifting the Colombian title, but a goal from Jhon Valoy in the 94th minute sent the game to penalties, where Nacional won the shootout and lifted their third consecutive title, becoming the first Colombian club to win three consecutive short tournaments. Nacional followed this championship with a good performance in the 2014 Copa Sudamericana, and although they were almost eliminated at the hands of Paraguayan minnows General Díaz in the second stage, they made the finals, where they faced River Plate. The first leg, played in Medellín, was a 1–1 draw. The second leg, played in Buenos Aires, was won by River Plate with a 2–0 score, making this the second runner-up finish for the club after losing the final in 2002.

In the 2015 Torneo Apertura, Nacional was eliminated in the quarterfinals by eventual champion Deportivo Cali. After the tournament ended, Osorio left the team after getting signed by São Paulo, being replaced by Reinaldo Rueda, who previously managed the Ecuador national team and got them to the 2014 FIFA World Cup, doing the same with the Honduras national team in 2010. In the Torneo Finalización, Nacional achieved 45 points in the regular season, winning 14 out of 20 games. They qualified to the playoffs as the first seed and later beat crosstown rivals Independiente Medellín on their path to the finals, where they defeated Junior on penalties after a 2–2 draw on aggregate. Jefferson Duque was the top goalscorer of the team and the tournament with 15 goals. With this title, Nacional became the team with the most league titles with fifteen and a total of twenty-five titles including international tournaments.

2016 Copa Libertadores Finals, second leg starting lineup

The start of 2016 brought a second Superliga Colombiana title, beating Deportivo Cali, thus qualifying for the 2016 Copa Sudamericana. Nacional placed second in the 2016 Torneo Apertura with 39 points, just one point behind rivals Independiente Medellín. The club was eliminated by Junior in the semifinals, losing 4–2 on penalties.

In the 2016 Copa Libertadores, Nacional topped its group, winning five of its six matches while conceding no goals. Nacional faced Huracán again in the round of 16. In the first leg in Buenos Aires the teams got a 0–0 draw, while in the second leg at home, Nacional won 4–2, conceding its first goals of the tournament. In the quarterfinals, they faced Rosario Central. The first leg ended with Nacional's first defeat, with Walter Montoya scoring the lone goal of the match. In the second leg in Medellín, Marco Ruben scored a penalty goal in the eighth minute, thus forcing Nacional to score at least three goals to advance, something they accomplished. The first goal was scored by Macnelly Torres in injury time of the first half. In the second half Alejandro Guerra scored in the 50th minute and Orlando Berrío scored the goal to eliminate Rosario in the last minute of the match, shortly before a huge brawl began which eventually extended the match up to the 100th minute. In the semifinals, Nacional faced Brazilian club São Paulo. The team won both matches; the first a 2–0 win in the Estádio do Morumbi with a brace from Miguel Borja, who was bought by Nacional after becoming the top goalscorer of the Torneo Apertura with 19 goals in 21 matches for Cortuluá, and was playing his first match with the team. The second leg was a 2–1 win, with an early Jonathan Calleri goal for the Brazilians and again with a brace from Miguel Borja for the local team. The victory meant Nacional reached the finals of the Copa Libertadores for the first time since 1995, and their fifth international final overall. In the finals, they beat Independiente del Valle 2–1 on aggregate, winning their second cup and becoming the very first Colombian club to win the competition multiple times. In 2016, Nacional also won its third Copa Colombia title after beating Junior in the finals with an aggregate score of 3–1, becoming the most successful club in the tournament.

The participation of Nacional in the 2016 Copa Sudamericana began in August, with Nacional eliminating Peruvian club Deportivo Municipal 6–0 on aggregate. In the next round they beat Bolívar 2–1 on aggregate, thanks to goals from Borja in each leg. In the round of 16, Nacional eliminated Paraguayan club Sol de América 3–1 on aggregate. In the quarterfinals, the team faced Brazilian club Coritiba, with the first leg ending in a draw. In the second leg at home, Nacional turned a 1-0 deficit at halftime as Coritiba started winning the match with a free kick goal from César González, but the Verdolagas came back in the second half and secured a 3-1 victory with a hat-trick from Borja, who became the top goalscorer of the tournament with six goals. In the semifinals, Nacional faced Paraguayan club Cerro Porteño, who had eliminated two Colombian sides in the previous rounds, Santa Fe (the winner of the previous edition) and Independiente Medellín. Nacional advanced to the finals for the third time in its history, eliminating Cerro Porteño on away goals.

For the finals, Nacional had to face Brazilian team Chapecoense. It was the first final in an international competition for the Brazilian side, who had eliminated Cuiabá, Independiente, Junior and San Lorenzo to reach that round. The matches for the finals were scheduled to be played on 30 November in Medellín and 7 December in Curitiba. However, on 28 November, two days before the first leg, LaMia Flight 2933 crashed in Cerro Gordo, La Unión, just a few kilometres from Medellín, with the Chapecoense team on board. 71 people died, including 19 Chapecoense players, and the finals were suspended as a result. Two days later, Atlético Nacional requested CONMEBOL to award Chapecoense with the title. On the planned date of the match, Nacional and the City Council of Medellín organised a memorial to honor the victims of the tragedy. About 45,000 people were present inside the stadium and thousand more in the streets. On 5 December, CONMEBOL awarded Chapecoense the title of the 2016 Copa Sudamericana, as requested by Atlético Nacional, who received the "CONMEBOL Centenario Fair Play" award for their gesture.

In the 2016 Torneo Finalización, Nacional placed first with 37 points and qualified for the quarterfinals. The team was eliminated in the semifinals by Santa Fe: the first match ended in a 1–1 draw but the second was a 0–4 defeat, with Nacional playing with its youth squad due to its first-team squad competing in the Club World Cup. Nacional qualified to the 2016 FIFA Club World Cup as the champion of the 2016 Copa Libertadores, representing South America in the competition. The team began its participation in the semifinals, facing Japanese team Kashima Antlers, who defeated Nacional 3–0 and became the first AFC team to reach the final. Nacional got third place after beating CONCACAF Champions League winner Club América 4–3 on penalties after a 2–2 draw in regulation time.

Atlético Nacional got its first title of 2017 after beating Brazilian team Chapecoense in the Recopa Sudamericana. The Brazilian side won the first leg with a 2–1 score; however, Atlético Nacional got a 4–1 victory in the second leg, achieving a 5–3 win on aggregate and winning the tournament.

In the 2017 Copa Libertadores, Nacional was left with no chance to advance to the round of 16 after a 1–0 defeat to Botafogo. Although Nacional won their last match against Barcelona 3–1, it was not enough for the Copa Sudamericana and Nacional crashed out of the competition in the group stage, with six points. Despite the early elimination, the team fared much better in the local tournament, winning its sixteenth league championship in the 2017 Apertura. After a 2–0 defeat to Deportivo Cali in the first leg, Nacional had a sensational comeback in the second leg and won the title after a 5–1 victory at Estadio Atanasio Girardot. Shortly after the final, Reinaldo Rueda left his post as manager, being replaced by Spanish manager Juan Manuel Lillo. Lillo resigned after Nacional were eliminated from the 2017 Finalizacion playoffs by Deportes Tolima on penalties.

== Rivalries ==
Atlético Nacional has had a long rivalry with local team Independiente Medellín, known under the name of El Clásico Paisa, with the word "Paisa" referring to something originating in the Antioquia Department. It is considered one of the most important rivalries in Colombia, and recognised by FIFA as one of the most important match-ups in the country, mainly due to the frequent brawls in between both fanbases. Nacional currently leads this rivalry in terms of wins, with a 30+ win margin. They also lead in accolades won, with 33 to Medellín's 9. However, Independiente Medellín beat them in the first final series in which they faced each other in the 2004 Apertura, which is regarded as a great achievement by Medellín given that throughout history Nacional's squads have almost always had a larger market value than that of Medellín's.

The rivalry between Atlético Nacional and Millonarios is one of the most important matches in Colombia, with the two clubs holding the most league titles in Colombia (18 and 16, respectively). Dubbed by Colombian media as well as CONMEBOL as one of the most important clásicos or a "superclásico" of Colombian football, this rivalry is also considered one of the greatest classic matches in South America by the international press. The rivalry is fueled by a social, cultural and regional character, since it evokes the historical rivalry between two of the most developed regions of Colombia: the Antioquia Department (specifically its capital city Medellín) and the nation's capital Bogotá.

Atlético Nacional also has a strong rivalry with América de Cali which involves the two Colombian clubs with the largest fanbases, and has been called by Colombian and international media as one of the most important clásicos or a superclásico of Colombian football, just like the rivalry with Millonarios. This rivalry is considered as an extension of the historical sociocultural and sporting rivalry between the Antioquia and Valle del Cauca departments, represented by Atlético Nacional and América, respectively. This match gained importance starting from the decade of the 1980s, when both América de Cali and Atlético Nacional began to stand out in local competition and continental tournaments. The two teams have faced each other in final stages 15 times and have played five league title-deciders between them: in 1981, 1984, 1991, 1999, and the 2002 Apertura, with Nacional winning three of these (1981, 1991, 1999) and América the remaining two.

== Brand ==
=== Colors and uniform ===
The flagship colors of the team, green and white, are derived from the flags of the Antioquia Department and its capital city of Medellín, and the team is known as the cuadro verdes. Black is often also used as a secondary colour by the team. The team previously also utilized red but discontinued it due to its association with the rival team Independiente Medellín.

The team's uniform at home is primarily green while its away colours are white with green accents. The team also has a third jersey utilizing its black secondary colour. The team's main sponsor featured on its jersey since 2024 is the global betting operator Betsson.

=== Badge ===
Atlético Nacional's current badge was adopted in 2000. The badge consists of a rectangle elongated downward, with the initials A and N inside, and the tower of a castle above symbolizing "grandeur, tradition, strength and hierarchy", similar to the city's coat of arms.

The club's main nickname, Verdolagas (purslanes) was coined in the 1950s, when the club began using green kits. This plant is endemic to the Paisa region since pre-Columbian times. The plant blooms a diminutive yellow, white or red flower; the white variety is the most common in the region, giving the color scheme to the team. It is also noteworthy that Antioquia has a great tradition regarding the cultivation of flowers, displayed annually during the Festival of Flowers.

Evolution of Atlético Nacional's badge

1935–1946

1947–1949

=== Mascot ===
Mascot

Mascot of the club

== Stadium ==
Atlético Nacional plays its local games at the Atanasio Girardot Stadium, which is part of the Atanasio Girardot Sports Complex and is owned by the Municipality of Medellín. The stadium is shared with crosstown rivals Independiente Medellín. It is located in the northwestern part of the city and has a capacity of 45,087 spectators. It was inaugurated on 19 March 1953 with a game between Nacional and Alianza Lima, which finished in a 2–2 draw.

Before 1948, when the team was known as Unión Indulana Foot-Ball Club, they played its local games at Los Libertadores Racecourse. With the creation of the professional league, they moved to San Fernando Racecourse in Itagüí, where they played until the inauguration of the Atanasio Girardot in 1953.

== Honours ==
Atlético Nacional honours
| Type | Competition | Titles | Seasons |
|---|---|---|---|
| Domestic | Categoría Primera A | 18 | 1954, 1973, 1976, 1981, 1991, 1994, 1999, 2005–I, 2007–I, 2007–II, 2011–I, 2013–I, 2013–II, 2014–I, 2015–II, 2017–I, 2022–I, 2024–II |
| Domestic | Copa Colombia | 8 | 2012, 2013, 2016, 2018, 2021, 2023, 2024, 2025 |
| Domestic | Superliga Colombiana | 4 | 2012, 2016, 2023, 2025 |
| Continental | Copa Libertadores | 2 | 1989, 2016 |
| Continental | Copa Interamericana | 2 | 1989, 1995 |
| Continental | Copa Merconorte | 2 | 1998, 2000 |
| Continental | Recopa Sudamericana | 1 | 2017 |
| Regional | Liga Antioqueña - Segunda División | 1 | 1942 |

- record
- ^{s} shared record

=== Runner-up finishes ===
- Categoría Primera A
  - Runners-up (13): 1955, 1965, 1971, 1974, 1988, 1990, 1992, 2002–I, 2004–I, 2004–II, 2018–I, 2023–I, 2026–I
- Superliga Colombiana
  - Runners-up (3): 2014, 2015, 2018
- Copa Libertadores
  - Runners-up (1): 1995
  - Semifinals (2): 1990, 1991
- Copa Sudamericana
  - Runners-up (3): 2002, 2014, 2016 (Note: Final cancelled due to the LaMia Flight 2933 plane crash that killed mostly players from Chapecoense on their way to play the first leg of the series. Chapecoense were awarded the Copa Sudamericana title per request from Atlético Nacional.)
  - Semifinals (1): 2003
- Recopa Sudamericana
  - Runners-up (1): 1990
- Intercontinental Cup
  - Runners-up (1): 1989
- Copa Simón Bolívar
  - Runners-up (1): 1971
- FIFA Club World Cup
  - Third Place (1): 2016

=== Awards ===
- FIFA Fair Play Award: 2016
- IFFHS The World's Club Team of the Year: 2016

== Players ==
=== Current squad ===
As of 13 September 2026

Note: Flags indicate national team as defined under FIFA eligibility rules; some limited exceptions apply. Players may hold more than one non-FIFA nationality.

| No. | Pos. | Nation | Player |
|---|---|---|---|
| 3 | DF | COL | Néider Parra |
| 4 | DF | COL | César Haydar |
| 6 | DF | COL | Andrés Román |
| 7 | FW | COL | Marlos Moreno |
| 8 | MF | COL | Mateus Uribe |
| 9 | FW | COL | Alfredo Morelos |
| 10 | MF | COL | Edwin Cardona |
| 13 | FW | COL | Nicolás Rodríguez (on loan from Orlando City SC) |
| 14 | MF | COL | Felipe Marín |
| 15 | DF | COL | Andrés Reyes |
| 16 | DF | COL | William Tesillo |
| 17 | FW | COL | Cristian Arango (on loan from San Jose Earthquakes) |
| 19 | MF | COL | Juan Rengifo |
| 20 | DF | ARG | Milton Casco |
| 21 | MF | COL | Jorman Campuzano |
| 22 | MF | ARG | Elías Cabrera (on loan from Vélez Sarsfield) |

| No. | Pos. | Nation | Player |
|---|---|---|---|
| 23 | MF | COL | James Rodríguez |
| 24 | MF | COL | Juan Rosa |
| 25 | GK | COL | Luis Marquinez |
| 26 | MF | COL | Elkin Rivero |
| 27 | DF | COL | Yeicar Perlaza |
| 29 | FW | COL | Andrés Sarmiento |
| 30 | MF | COL | Kevin Parra |
| 31 | DF | COL | Xavi Ríos |
| 33 | DF | COL | Samuel Velásquez |
| 34 | GK | ARG | Franco Armani |
| 35 | MF | COL | Matías Lozano |
| 37 | MF | COL | Luis Landázuri |
| 44 | GK | COL | Edimer Zea |
| 80 | MF | COL | Juan Manuel Zapata |
| 99 | FW | COL | Ian Poveda |

=== Out on loan ===
Note: Flags indicate national team as defined under FIFA eligibility rules; some limited exceptions apply. Players may hold more than one non-FIFA nationality.

| No. | Pos. | Nation | Player |
|---|---|---|---|
| — | GK | COL | Kevin Cataño (at Internacional de Bogotá until 30 June 2027) |
| — | DF | COL | Cristian Uribe (at Real Cundinamarca until 30 June 2027) |
| — | MF | COL | Miguel Correa (at Deportivo Cali until 30 June 2027) |
| — | MF | COL | Kilian Toscano (at Santa Fe until 31 December 2026) |

| No. | Pos. | Nation | Player |
|---|---|---|---|
| — | FW | COL | Emilio Aristizábal (at Toronto FC until 31 December 2026) |
| — | FW | VEN | Eduard Bello (at Deportivo Cali until 30 June 2027) |
| — | FW | COL | Andy Batioja (at Fortaleza until 31 December 2026) |

=== World Cup players ===
The following players were chosen to represent their country at the FIFA World Cup while contracted with Atlético Nacional.

- (Colombia) Jairo Arias (1962)
- (Colombia) Ignacio Calle (1962)
- (Peru) César Cueto (1982)
- (Peru) Guillermo La Rosa (1982)
- (Colombia) Geovanis Cassiani (1990)
- (Colombia) Luis Fajardo (1990)
- (Colombia) Gildardo Biderman Gómez (1990)
- (Colombia) René Higuita (1990)
- (Colombia) Luis Carlos Perea (1990)
- (Colombia) José Ricardo Pérez (1990)
- (Colombia) León Fernando Villa (1990)
- (Colombia) Leonel Álvarez (1990,1994)
- (Colombia) Andrés Escobar (1990,1994)
- (Colombia) Luis Fernando Herrera (1990, 1994)
- (Colombia) Hernán Gaviria (1994)
- (Colombia) Gabriel Jaime Gómez (1994)
- (Colombia) Mauricio Serna (1994)
- (Colombia) Miguel Calero (1998)
- (Colombia) Andrés Estrada (1998)
- (Colombia) Ever Palacios (1998)
- (Colombia) José Fernando Santa (1998)
- (Colombia) Alexander Mejía (2014)
- (Colombia) David Ospina (2026)

== Women ==
Atlético Nacional Femenino is the women's football section of Atlético Nacional and they currently play in the Colombian Women's Football League, the top level women's football league in Colombia. Atlético Nacional's women's team was founded as a youth academy on 25 August 2009, with the project being led by Diego Bedoya as manager and supported by Víctor Marulanda. The club entered the women's league for its second season in 2018, in which they ended as runners-up. They also placed third at the 2023 Copa Libertadores Femenina.
