= Andrés Estrada =

Colombian footballer (born 1967)

Personal information
- Full name: Andrés Estrada Murillo
- Date of birth: November 12, 1967 (age 58)
- Place of birth: Medellín, Colombia
- Height: 1.74 m (5 ft 9 in)
- Position: Midfielder

International career
Years	Team	Apps	(Gls)
1996–1998	Colombia	12	(0)

Andrés Estrada Murillo (born November 12, 1967) is a Colombian former professional footballer who played as a midfielder.
