= Gabriel Gómez (footballer, born 1959) =

Colombian footballer

Personal information
- Full name: Gabriel Jaime Gómez Jaramillo
- Date of birth: December 8, 1959 (age 66)
- Place of birth: Medellín, Colombia
- Height: 1.70 m (5 ft 7 in)
- Position: Midfielder

Senior career*
Years	Team	Apps	(Gls)
1981–1986	Atlético Nacional	181	(30)
1987–1988	Millonarios	46	(13)
1989–1990	Independiente Medellín	24	(2)
1991–1994	Atlético Nacional	102	(9)
1995	Independiente Medellín	0	(0)
1991	Union Atletico Tachira		
Total		353	(54)

International career
1985–1995	Colombia	49	(2)

Managerial career
- 1995: Envigado
- 1997 –1998: Atlético Nacional
- 1999: Unión Magdalena
- Deportivo Quito
- 2001: Bucaramanga
- 2005: Caracas
- 2008: Atlético Nacional
- * Club domestic league appearances and goals

Gabriel Jaime Barrabas Gómez Jaramillo (born 8 December 1959) is a retired Colombian footballer who played as a central midfielder.

== Club career ==
During his career, Gómez played mainly for hometown side Atlético Nacional, representing the club in eight professional seasons, in two different spells, and helping the team to three first division titles.

Incidentally, in 1989, when Atlético won the Libertadores Cup, he played for city neighbours Independiente Medellín, having signed from Club Deportivo Los Millonarios. After returning to Nacional in 1991, Gómez retired four years later, at the age of 36.

After he retired from playing, Gómez became a football coach. He has managed Envigado, Atlético Nacional, Unión Magdalena and Atlético Bucaramanga in Colombia, Deportivo Quito in Ecuador and Caracas FC in Venezuela.

== International career ==
During nearly one full decade, Gómez was capped 49 times for Colombia, scoring twice. He represented the nation in two FIFA World Cups, 1990 and 1994, and three Copa América tournaments: 1987, 1989 and 1993.

In the World Cup, Gómez started in all four of his country's matches in 1990, as Colombia were ousted in the round of 16 by Cameroon.

In the 1994 World Cup, in the United States, the team received death threats from unknown people prior to the second group stage match against the hosts, saying the entire team would be killed if Gómez were to appear in the match. Coach Francisco Maturana pulled Gómez from the roster and he did not play in the match. The team subsequently lost the match 1-2, with one of the two goals for the USA being an own goal scored by Colombian defender Andrés Escobar. The team was eliminated from the tournament, and six days later Andrés Escobar was murdered in Medellín.

== Honours ==
Season	Team	Title
1981	Atlético Nacional	Colombian League
1988	Millonarios	Colombian League
1991	Atlético Nacional	Colombian League
1994	Atlético Nacional	Colombian League

== Personal ==
Gómez's older brother, Hernán Darío, coached the national teams of Colombia and Ecuador, amongst others. In 1998, whilst in charge of the former, he also received anonymous death threats.
