= Luis Herrera (footballer) =

Colombian footballer (born 1962)

Personal information
- Full name: Luis Fernando Herrera Arango
- Date of birth: June 12, 1962 (age 64)
- Place of birth: Medellín, Colombia
- Height: 1.68 m (5 ft 6 in)
- Position: Defender

Senior career*
Years	Team	Apps	(Gls)
1981–1983	Independiente Medellín		
1984–1985	Atletico Bucaramanga		
1986	América de Cali		
1987–1996	Atlético Nacional	286	(2)

International career
1987–1996	Colombia	61	(1)
- * Club domestic league appearances and goals as of April 2008

Luis Fernando "El Chonto" Herrera Arango (born June 12, 1962) is a retired football defender. He was capped 61 times and scored 1 international goal for Colombia between 1987 and 1996. He is current head coach for Atlético Huila.

== Career ==
Herrera (nicknamed Chonto) played most of his club career for Atlético Nacional in Colombia, where he was part of the team that won the Copa Libertadores in 1989. He also helped the club to win two Colombia league titles in 1991 and 1994.

Herrera played three matches at the 1994 World Cup, and four matches at the 1990 World Cup. He also played in three editions of the Copa América in 1987, 1991 and 1993.

== Titles ==
Season	Team	Title
1989	Atlético Nacional	Copa Libertadores 1990 Atletico Nacional Copa Interamericana
1991	Atlético Nacional	Colombia league
1994	Atlético Nacional	Colombia league
