= León Villa =

Colombian footballer (born 1960)

Personal information
- Full name: León Fernando Villa Arango
- Date of birth: January 12, 1960 (age 66)
- Place of birth: Colombia
- Height: 1.72 m (5 ft 8 in)
- Position: Defender

Senior career*
| Years | Team | Apps | (Gls) |
| 1982–1992 | Atlético Nacional | 307 | (6) |
| 1993–1994 | Deportes Quindío | 67 | (1) |
| Total | | 374 | (7) |

International career
| 1989–1990 | Colombia | 7 | (0) |
- * Club domestic league appearances and goals

León Fernando Villa Arango (born 12 January 1960) is a former professional Colombian football defender who played in the 1990 FIFA World Cup for the Colombia national football team.

== Career ==
Born in Medellín, Villa played professional football for Independiente Medellín, Atlético Nacional and Deportes Quindío. He won the 1989 Copa Libertadores with Nacional.

After he retired from playing, Villa became a football coach. He managed Quindío in 1994.
