= List of 2014 FIFA World Cup controversies =

The 2014 FIFA World Cup in Brazil generated various controversies, including demonstrations, some of which took place even before the tournament started. Most centred on officiating, with referees coming under criticism for their performances. Furthermore, there were various issues with safety, including eight deaths of workers and a fire during construction, breaches into stadiums, an unstable makeshift staircase at the Maracanã Stadium, a monorail collapse, and the collapse of an unfinished overpass in Belo Horizonte. The most notable disciplinary case was that of Uruguayan striker Luis Suárez, who was disciplined after biting an Italian player, defender Giorgio Chiellini, during a game.

== Before the tournament ==
=== Protests ===
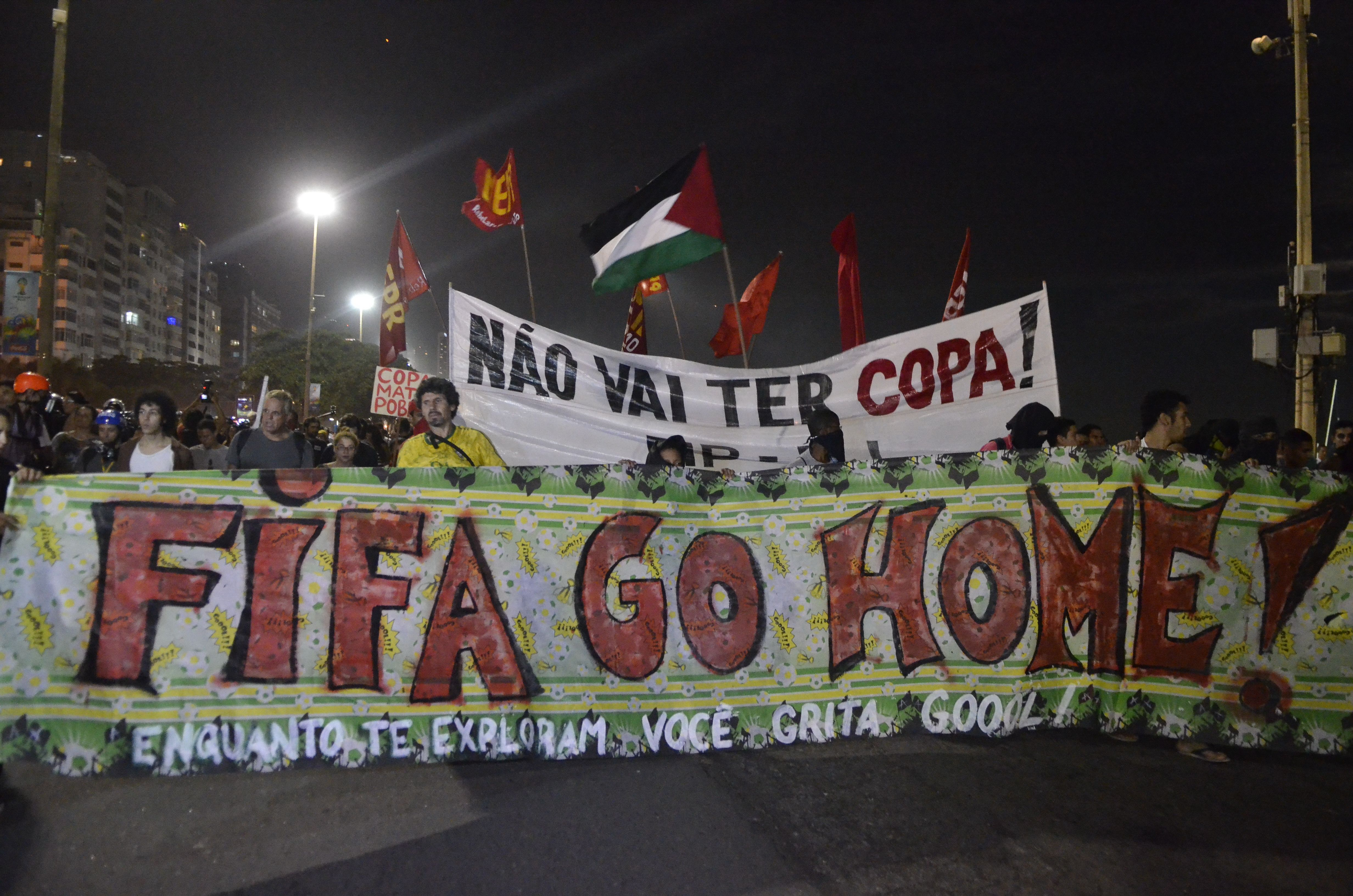
Anti-World Cup demonstration on the opening day.

Prior to the opening ceremony of the 2013 FIFA Confederations Cup staged in Brazil, demonstrations took place outside the venue, organised by people unhappy with the amount of public money spent to enable the hosting of the FIFA World Cup. Both President of Brazil Dilma Rousseff and FIFA President Sepp Blatter were heavily booed as they were announced to give their speeches at the 2013 tournament's opening, which resulted in FIFA announcing that the 2014 World Cup opening ceremony would not feature any speeches. Further protests took place outside other matches during the Confederations Cup as part of wider unrest and rioting in Brazilian cities, seeking to express disenchantment with the government's financial management of the country.

The weeks preceding the 2014 World Cup, as well as the first days of the tournament, featured further unrest and protests across the country against the spending. Unlike at the Confederations Cup, however, security forces managed to prevent any protests from reaching the stadiums.

While covering a protest for CNN during the 12 June opening game, reporter Shasta Darlington and producer Barbara Arvanitidis were injured. Arvanitidis was directly hit on the wrist by a tear-gas bomb while they were reporting the indiscriminate use of riot weapons.

Blatter said that the protesters "should not use football to make their demands heard", and that the public expenditure on staging the tournaments was on "items that are for the future, not just for the World Cup". President Rousseff responded with a public address in which she stated, "The federal money spent on the stadiums is in the form of financing that will be duly repaid by the companies and governments that are exploiting these stadiums."

A mural by street artist Paulo Ito became a global viral phenomenon in the month before the World Cup. The spray paint and latex work depicted a black child sobbing at a dinner table, with nothing on his plate but a football. Ito intended the mural to focus on the FIFA issue, but worldwide it was often interpreted as a general attack on President Rousseff and the Workers' Party, an idea that Ito called simply "stupid".

Former Brazilian footballer and now political figure Romário labelled the tournament "the biggest theft in history", saying that he believed its real cost would exceed R$100 billion (£26 billion/€32 billion/US$45 billion). He called for a deeper investigation into the widespread misuse of public funds, which he identified as the reason for the continuing protests. Nevertheless, he was criticised by the ruling Workers' Party for receiving R$1 million to appear in two TV advertisements which promoted the World Cup.

Directly before the tournament, President Rousseff reiterated her assurances of the previous year that all the implemented public works had long-term benefits for Brazilians.

=== Budweiser bill ===
After numerous deaths in football stadiums, Brazil passed a law in 2003 outlawing alcohol sales in stadiums. FIFA demanded that Brazil allow alcohol sales at the World Cup because Budweiser, a major World Cup sponsor, was the "Official Beer of the FIFA World Cup", a role it had played since 1986. In response, Brazil passed a law paving the way for alcohol sales in the World Cup, nicknamed the "Budweiser Bill".

=== Seeding of France ===
There was some controversy before the draw when FIFA decided upon their allocation of the draw pots. Only eight sides were seeded for the World Cup draw: the hosts plus the seven sides ranked highest in the October 2013 FIFA World Rankings. The remaining 24 unseeded sides were allocated to three pots based on their geographical locations. However, there were still nine unseeded European sides, which meant that one European side had to be allocated to Pot 2, which otherwise consisted of African and South American sides. A similar situation arose with the 2006 World Cup seeding, and on that occasion the lowest ranked European side at the time of the draw, Serbia and Montenegro, were placed in the alternative pot.

For the 2014 draw, FIFA decided that the European team in Pot 2 would be drawn there randomly. France would have been the lowest ranked side, and many thought, based on the 2006 precedent, that the rule change benefitted them.

Many officials, fans, and journalists complained, pointing out that a Frenchman, FIFA secretary general Jérôme Valcke, suggested the change, and suspecting that another influential Frenchman, UEFA president Michel Platini, helped approve it. Instead, Italy were drawn into Pot 2 and ended up in a difficult group. The next day, a headline in the Italian sports periodical Corriere Dello Sport read, "2014 World Cup draw: What a scandal!".

== Group stage ==
=== Brazil vs Croatia ===
During the opening match of the World Cup, Japanese referee Yuichi Nishimura faced heavy criticism for his referring performance between the Croatia and the host team Brazil as several decisions favoured the host nation.

In the 71st minute, Croatian defender Dejan Lovren put his hands below Brazilian striker Fred's arms in the Croatian penalty area, after which Fred fell down. Nishimura awarded Brazil a penalty kick which Neymar converted for their second goal in their 3–1 win. The call was condemned by various sources, including former top-level FIFA referees, newspaper writers, players from other teams and fans in Nishimura's home country, saying that Lovren's contact was minimal and that Fred went down on his own. Twelve minutes later, the Croatians had an equaliser controversially disallowed for a supposed foul by Croatian forward Ivica Olić on the Brazilian goalkeeper Júlio César.

Earlier in the game, in the 26th minute, Neymar elbowed the Croatian midfielder Luka Modrić, after which Neymar was shown a yellow card. At that time Croatia were leading the game 1–0. Many critics agreed that Neymar's punishment was too lenient and that Neymar should have been shown a red card.

Renowned former top-level FIFA referee Markus Merk questioned FIFA's appointment of Nishimura in the opening match, labelling the refereeing as "embarrassing". Massimo Busacca, the head of refereeing development at FIFA, defended Nishimura's penalty kick decision and insisted that Dejan Lovren's contact was significant enough.

=== Mexico vs Cameroon: Giovani's two disallowed goals ===
In the Group A game between Mexico and Cameroon, Mexican midfielder Giovani dos Santos had two goals wrongly disallowed for offside in the first half. Replays showed that he was in line with the second to last defender for the first, while the ball came from a deliberate play by a Cameroonian player for the second. Following the game, which Mexico won 1–0, Amy Lawrence of The Guardian described the tournament as having "incompetent officiating", and called for FIFA president Sepp Blatter to allow team managers to challenge two decisions per match with video review, a possibility that Blatter discussed before the tournament. On 20 June 2014, FIFA announced that they had removed the Colombian assistant referee responsible for the incidents, Humberto Clavijo, from further officiating at the tournament.

=== Brazil vs Mexico ===
Both Brazilian and Mexican fans abused each other with homophobic chants during the match.

=== Spain vs Netherlands: Behaviour of Diego Costa ===
Much attention ahead of the tournament had focused on the switch of Brazilian-born striker Diego Costa to Spain. Costa returned to his native land for his World Cup debut, only for his new team to lose 5–1 to the Netherlands in their opening game in Group B. Jeers and insults were heard from the local fans throughout the match. Costa also noticeably headbutted his opponent Bruno Martins Indi during the game and was subsequently substituted by his coach Vicente del Bosque for striker Fernando Torres.

=== Germany vs Portugal ===
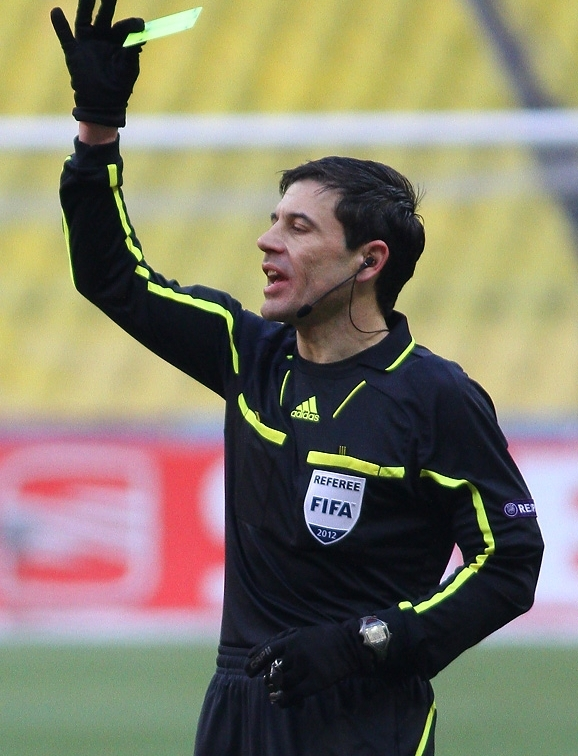
Milorad Mažić, referee of the first Group G and third Group F match

In the Group G game between Germany and Portugal, there were some contentious decisions by the Serbian referee, Milorad Mažić.

In the 12th minute, Mažić awarded Germany a penalty as the Portuguese defender João Pereira held back the German midfielder Mario Götze, and gave Pereira a yellow card for the foul. The Portuguese players, including a very agitated Pepe, surrounded Mažić in protest. Germany's Thomas Müller scored the penalty to give Germany team a 1–0 lead. The penalty call was questioned by Portugal's coach Paulo Bento, who called it "forced". The Daily Telegraph's Mark Ogden labelled it "another example of questionable refereeing at this World Cup as contact appeared slight, certainly not enough to force Götze, who made the most of the challenge, off his feet".

In the 37th minute, Portuguese defender Pepe headbutted Thomas Müller, and was shown a straight red card. The former World Cup referee Brian Hall condemned Müller for using theatrical action to "gain unfair advantage" by "tricking the referee". The situation turned out to be the match's biggest talking point with observer reaction generally centred on the condemnation of Pepe's actions and whether Müller overemphasised the initial contact.

In the 75th minute, Mažić failed to award a penalty kick to Portugal, prompting much irritation from the players. Germany ended up winning 4–0, with Müller scoring three goals. In his post-match comments, Bento said Mažić showed "bias" on both occasions, adding, "I am not saying it was only the referee's fault. We also made mistakes but the circumstances of what happened in the first half made the rest of the game difficult for us...The sending-off was forced on the player. I don't know if it was because of Pepe's reputation. It depends what sort of a reputation you think Pepe has."

=== Cameroon vs Croatia: Assou-Ekotto headbutts his teammate ===
Much attention was given to apparent action of Benoît Assou-Ekotto to headbutt his Cameroonian teammate, Benjamin Moukandjo. The incident was seemingly missed by officials but was captured on playback. Assou-Ekotto later attributed this to frustration. Cameroon's Alex Song also earned a red card by elbowing Croatian forward Mario Mandžukić in the back in the same game.

=== Italy vs Costa Rica: Chiellini kicks Campbell ===
In the Group D game between Italy and Costa Rica, Costa Rican forward Joel Campbell was kicked by Italian defender Giorgio Chiellini in the penalty area while looking for a goal, but Chilean referee Enrique Osses failed to award a penalty, enraging Costa Rica's coach Jorge Luis Pinto. Shortly afterwards, Pinto decided to charge at the referee's assistant, with Costa Rica's staff and substitutes following his lead. Former World Cup referee Graham Poll later tweeted, "HUGE moment in this match, how have Costa Rica not got a penalty?! Joel Campbell gets behind the Italy defence to race through on goal before he is clumsily brought down by a push from Giorgio Chiellini." Nevertheless, Costa Rican midfielder Bryan Ruiz scored a goal within a minute, which was eventually the game winner for Costa Rica as they won 1–0.

=== Argentina vs Iran ===
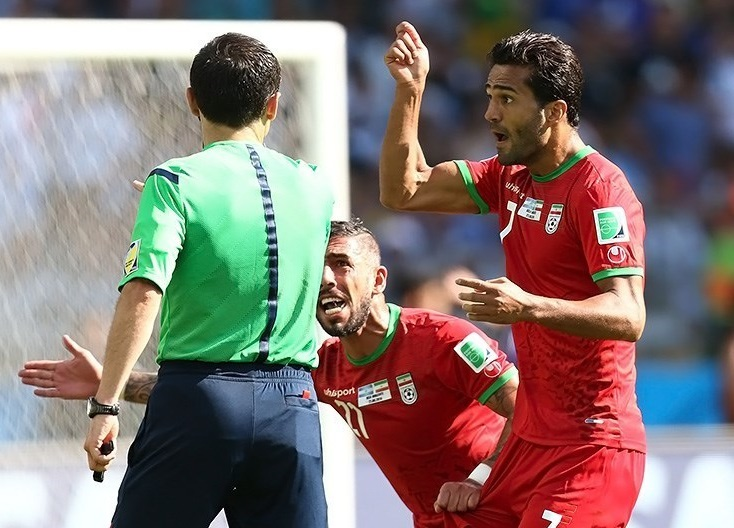
Iran national team players Ashkan Dejagah and Masoud Shojaei protesting Milorad Mažić

During the Group F game between Argentina and Iran, Serbian referee Milorad Mažić allegedly failed to award a penalty kick that would have favoured Iran. In addition to sparking a furious response from the Iranian players who rushed and bumped the referee, Mažić's non-call on Argentine defender Pablo Zabaleta's penalty area challenge on Iranian midfielder Ashkan Dejagah in the 55th minute produced a post-match discussion on whether a foul had been committed. Iranian print media, including the Jam-e-jam, Quds, and Iran daily newspapers, lambasted Mažić over his decision not to award a penalty shot, citing him as the reason Argentina won the match, Timothy Bancroft-Hinchey of Pravda.ru declared Mažić "either biased or incompetent" before proclaiming his 55th minute decision "a disgusting comment on the quality of referees chosen to manage the games of the FIFA World Cup", Metro wrote that despite Zabaleta getting his toe to the ball when tackling Dejagah, "replays showed Iran should've been awarded a spot-kick", SB Nation's Kim McCauley felt Dejagah had a "strong claim for a penalty". However, The Guardian's Barney Ronay and the Associated Press's Karl Ritter wrote in their reports that television replays suggest Zabaleta had gotten a touch on the ball first before bringing down Dejagah and therefore did not foul the Iranian. The Daily Telegraph also thought that the call was correct: "[Dejagah] is screaming for a penalty, so much so that he almost manhandles the referee in his frustration. I've no idea why, as replays suggest Zabaleta won the ball, albeit a little clumsily."

Iran's coach Carlos Queiroz questioned the 55th-minute non-call in his post-match comments, saying, "It should have been a penalty and red card. There's no excuse. There's nothing that can explain [why] this Serbian referee [did] not give the penalty. How can this guy sleep tonight, or for the rest of his life? With all respect, I would like to have the opportunity to have a one-on-one conversation with him. Why did he do that to us?" Argentina's coach Alejandro Sabella supported Mažić's non-call, feeling that Zabaleta got the ball first in his challenge.

=== Nigeria vs Bosnia and Herzegovina: Džeko's disallowed goal ===
During the Group F match between Nigeria and Bosnia and Herzegovina, New Zealand referee Peter O'Leary disallowed a goal to Bosnia and Herzegovina due to an incorrect offside call from his assistant. Nigeria won the game 1–0, which meant that Bosnia and Herzegovina were mathematically eliminated from advancing to the knockout stage. The referee was later pictured appearing to celebrate with Nigerian goalkeeper Vincent Enyeama after the match's end, an incident that Bosnian forward Edin Džeko, the scorer of the disallowed goal, called "shameful".

On 9 November 2014, Peter O'Leary, the game referee speaking to The New Zealand Herald admitted Džeko's goal was disallowed in error.

=== Greece vs Ivory Coast ===
In the final Group C game between Greece and Ivory Coast, Ecuadorean referee Carlos Vera awarded Greece a late penalty kick in the 91st minute of the match when he called a foul on Ivory Coast forward Giovanni Sio in a play where replays showed that Greek midfielder Georgios Samaras stubbed his foot into the pitch after the contact and fell down, which has been seen as controversial. Samaras converted the subsequent penalty kick to give Greece a 2–1 victory, which meant that they would advance on to the knockout stage. Had the penalty not been called, Ivory Coast would have advanced in a 1–1 draw. FIFA, however, accepted the penalty by appointing the referee as Fourth Official on the Final.

=== Croatia vs Mexico ===
During the Group A match between Croatia and Mexico, the Uzbek referee Ravshan Irmatov declined awarding a penalty after a possible handball by the Croatian defender Darijo Srna and did not send off Rafael Márquez, who later scored the first goal.

=== Italy vs Uruguay: Claudio Marchisio's red card and Luis Suárez biting incident ===
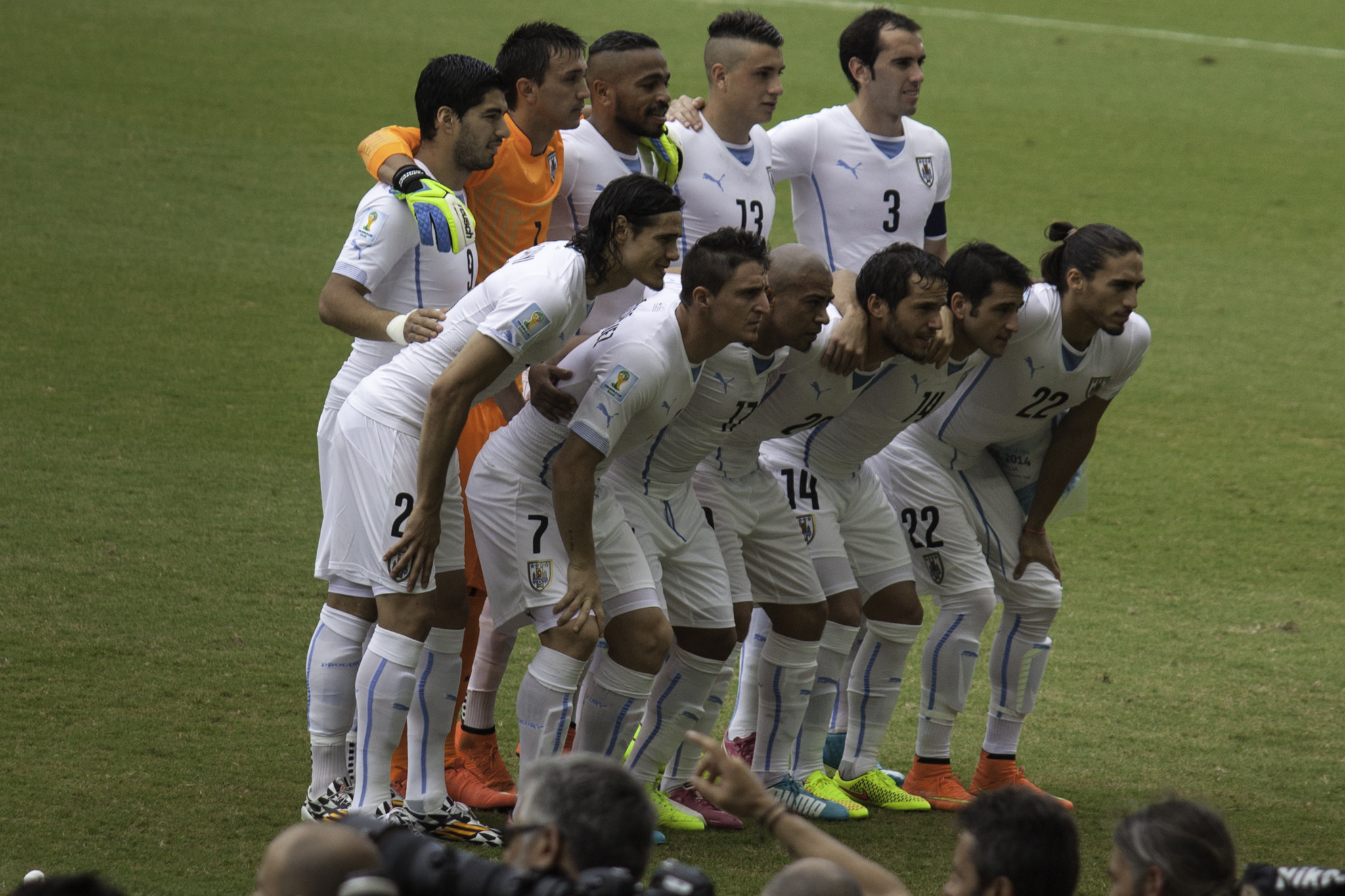
Uruguayan forward Luis Suárez (far back left) with the Uruguay national team at the Group D match

In the 59th minute, the Italian midfielder Claudio Marchisio made a high challenge on Egidio Arévalo Ríos and was shown a straight red card by the referee. Italy's coach Cesare Prandelli argued against this decision and claimed that the Mexican referee Marco Antonio Rodríguez had been showing bias against Italy, which had ruined the game for the Azzurri.

In the 79th minute of the match, Uruguay's striker Luis Suárez clashed with Italian defender Giorgio Chiellini while waiting for a cross. Replays showed that Suárez lunged at Chiellini and bit his shoulder, after which Suárez fell and clutched his face. As the Italian players protested to Rodríguez for not penalising Suárez, Uruguay won a corner and their defender Diego Godín scored. The game finished 1–0 to Uruguay, allowing them to qualify to the knockout stage as the Group D runners-up. Italy, who had also lost their previous game, were eliminated, finishing third in the group. It was the second successive time they had failed to qualify past the group stage in a World Cup, having won it in 2006. FIFA announced later the same day that it had opened disciplinary proceedings against Suárez.

These are just things that happen out on the pitch. It was just the two of us inside the area and he bumped into me with his shoulder and that's how my eye got like this as well. There are things that happen on the pitch and you should not make such a big deal out of them.

— Suárez's post-match interview against Italy, 24 June 2014

I lost my balance ... falling on top of my opponent ... I hit my face against [Chiellini], leaving a small bruise on my cheek and a strong pain in my teeth.

— Suárez's defence to the FIFA Disciplinary Committee, 25 June 2014

... the truth is that my colleague Giorgio Chiellini suffered the physical result of a bite in the collision he suffered with me ... I apologize to Giorgio Chiellini and the entire football family. I vow to the public that there will never again be another incident like [this].

— Suárez on 30 June 2014

Suárez had been found guilty of biting opponents on two previous occasions: Otman Bakkal in 2010 and Branislav Ivanović in 2013. He received a seven-game ban for the first incident and a ten-game ban for the second, where he was criticised for not recognising "the seriousness" of it.

On 26 June 2014, the FIFA Disciplinary Committee banned Suárez for nine international matches, effective immediately, meaning he would take no further part in the World Cup. It was the longest such ban in World Cup history, exceeding the eight-match ban handed to Italy's Mauro Tassotti for breaking the nose of Spain's Luis Enrique at the 1994 World Cup. He was also banned from taking part in any football-related activity, including entering any stadium, for four months and fined CHF100,000 (approx. £65,700/€82,000/US$119,000). The severity of the penalty was due to the fact that it was Suárez's third biting offence, as well as what FIFA saw as a lack of remorse. With Suárez banned, Uruguay lost their next match 2–0 to Colombia and were knocked out of the World Cup.

On the same day the ban was announced, the Uruguayan Football Association (AUF) said it would appeal against the decision. Suárez's lawyer claimed that "we don't have any doubts" of a European-based campaign against Suárez. Various Uruguayan individuals defended Suárez, questioning if he had actually bitten Chiellini, and criticised the severity of his ban, including the President of Uruguay José Mujica, who labelled the ban "fascist" and called FIFA "a bunch of old sons of bitches"; the Uruguayan Football Association (AUF) president Wilmar Valdez, Uruguay's captain Diego Lugano and their coach Óscar Tabárez, who resigned from two FIFA posts in protest. The Uruguayan media were also noted to have been in a defiant and defensive mood. Chiellini called the ban "excessive", while the international players' union FIFPro called for Suárez to "receive all the support he needs" and that the "focus should be on the rehabilitation and serious treatment" of Suárez.

Six days after the incident, on 30 June, Suárez apologised to Chiellini through Twitter and vowed never to repeat the incident, while writing that the "physical result of a bite" occurred in a collision with Chiellini. Chiellini responded through Twitter indicating that all was forgotten and his hope that FIFA would reduce Suárez's suspension.

On 3 July, the AUF appealed against Suárez's ban, but it was rejected by FIFA on 10 July. With the ban not preventing Suárez from transferring to another club, it was announced on 11 July that Suárez had agreed to move to Barcelona. Before the transfer, Barcelona's club president Josep Maria Bartomeu said the apology was "honourable", their sporting director Andoni Zubizarreta welcomed Suárez as being "humble enough to admit an error" and their new signing Ivan Rakitić commended Suárez's "character and strength".

=== Algeria vs Russia: laser used against Russian goalkeeper ===
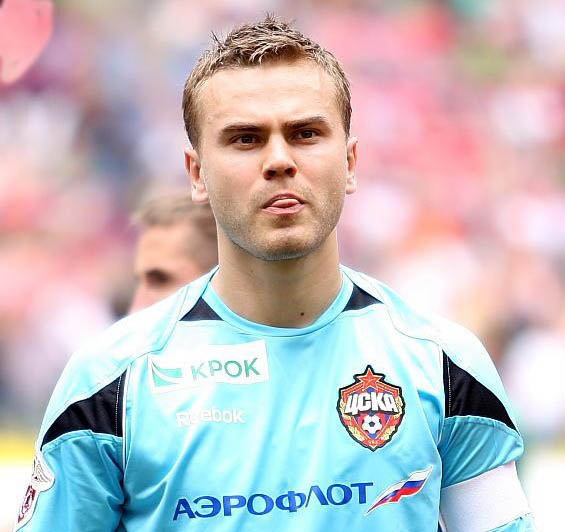
Russian goalkeeper Igor Akinfeev

The final group stage match between Algeria and Russia on 26 June ended 1–1, thus advancing Algeria to the knockout stage and eliminating Russia. A win for Russia would have seen them qualify, and they led the game 1–0 after six minutes with a goal from forward Aleksandr Kokorin. In the 60th minute of the game, a moving green light – most likely produced by a laser pointer – was shone in Russian goalkeeper Igor Akinfeev's face while he was defending from an Algerian free-kick, which striker Islam Slimani scored from to equalise. Russia's coach Fabio Capello blamed the laser for the decisive conceded goal, saying, "The goalkeeper was unable to do his job. The laser was in his face. It is not an excuse. You can see the footage."

After the match, the Algerian Football Federation (AFF) was fined CHF50,000 (approx. £33,000/€41,100/US$56,200) by FIFA for the use of lasers and other violations of the rules by Algerian fans in the stadium. Laser pointers were a prohibited item in the stadium, according to FIFA Stadium Safety and Security Regulations.

== Knockout stage ==
=== Brazil vs Chile ===
The first Round of 16 match, between Brazil and Chile, resulted in some confusions and controversies.

There was some doubt if the first goal of the match, scored by Brazil, was an own goal by Chile defender Gonzalo Jara, although FIFA confirmed that the goal was scored by Brazil's David Luiz.

English referee Howard Webb was criticised for calls which might have been too close or harsh, especially against Brazil: BBC Sport commentator and former England striker Gary Lineker said in a video that Webb made some "iffy decisions", such as denying a penalty kick award to Brazil forward Hulk at 13 minutes "that looked like it possibly was", and calling a handball against the same player at 55 minutes that was "a little bit harsh". Hulk had put the ball into Chile's net, but the referee ruled that he had controlled the ball using his arm. The goal was disallowed and he was shown the yellow card. Other commentators (including former England footballer Michael Owen, via Twitter) also questioned the handball decision against Hulk (made by English assistant referee Michael Mullarkey) as being a call which might have been too close.

Brazilian coach Scolari criticised the refereeing, mentioning that opposition teams were trying to injure Neymar, saying he had experienced the same thing with Cristiano Ronaldo when he was coaching Portugal.

=== Netherlands vs Mexico ===
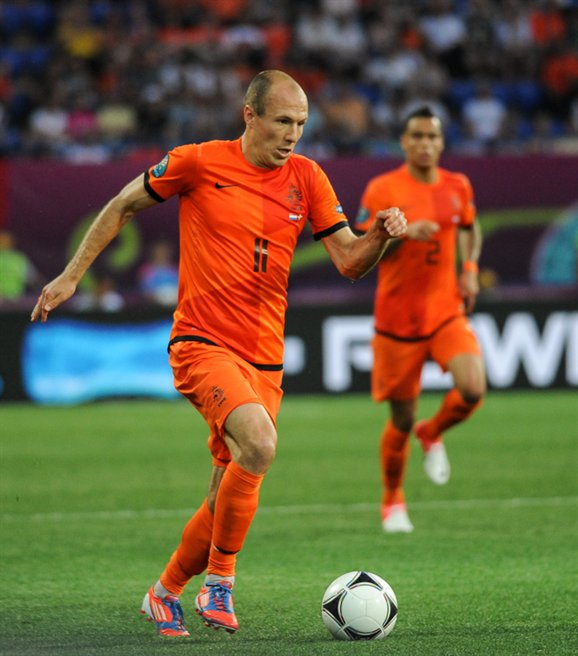
Dutch winger Arjen Robben

With the score 0–0, one minute into stoppage time of the first half of the Round of 16 match between Mexico and the Netherlands, Mexican defenders Rafael Márquez and Héctor Moreno double fouled Dutch winger Arjen Robben, who was in possession of the ball in the penalty box. Portuguese referee Pedro Proença waved to "play on", though Moreno's foul was so hard that he broke his own shinbone and had to be stretchered off the field.
While the score was 1–1, one minute into stoppage time of the second half, Robben again went down inside the area following another foul by Márquez, in which Márquez stepped on Robben's foot. This time the Netherlands was given a penalty kick, which striker Klaas-Jan Huntelaar converted for the game-winning goal, eliminating Mexico with a 2–1 win. Robben, who has a reputation for diving, was condemned widely in the press for his "theatrical fall" to earn the decisive penalty. After the match, Mexico's coach Miguel Herrera was seen arguing with referee Proença and later claimed, in an interview, "This was a World Cup where everyone was against Mexico." After the match, Robben admitted to going to ground too easily once during the game and said, "I must apologize. The one [at the end] was a penalty, but the other one just outside the box I went to ground too easily. I shouldn't be doing that." Robben also said that the pair of fouls against him, while he was inside the box during the first half, should have been awarded a penalty. Márquez claimed that Robben confessed to him at the end of the match that "it [the 90'+1 tackle] wasn't a penalty, though one of the previous was"; the Royal Dutch Football Association suggested that Robben's words were mistranslated.

In the aftermath of the event, many Mexican fans used the phrase "No era penal" (transl. It was not a penalty) for a number of years to refer to the moment. Robben offered a retorte in 2016 against those using said phrase saying to Grant Wahl "you have to admit already in the first half they didn’t give me a penalty, and it should have been a penalty. And the penalty itself, it was a penalty." Mexican fans have also cheered for the elimination of the Netherlands at subsequent World Cups due to the incident. The incident also was a major factor for FIFA to implement VAR starting in 2017.

=== France vs Nigeria ===
After the Round of 16 match between France and Nigeria, American referee Mark Geiger was accused by multiple Nigerian players, most notably midfielders Ogenyi Onazi and John Obi Mikel, forward Peter Odemwingie, as well as by Nigeria's coach Stephen Keshi, of having bias against Nigeria. Geiger was criticised for several calls throughout the game. This included a goal by Nigerian striker Emmanuel Emenike being cancelled for offside (although television replays suggest this may have been the correct decision); no red card for an apparent attempt by French striker Olivier Giroud to elbow Nigerian midfielder Mikel, no penalty being called against French left-back Patrice Evra for holding Odemwingie during a corner, a general lack of protection from the referee for persistent rough play and, most notably, only a yellow card being issued for a studs-in tackle by French midfielder Blaise Matuidi, which resulted in midfielder Onazi's left leg tendon being torn apart and requiring surgery, and forced to be substituted for midfielder Reuben Gabriel. Several commentators like Allan Jiang of Bleacherreport and Patrick Johnson of Yahoo! News noted that the decisions significantly impacted the match, especially the forced substitution of Onazi, which changed the complexion of the game, depriving Nigeria of its most influential midfielder.

=== Brazil vs Colombia ===
"I think they made a great choice with the referee, especially in those crucial moments when Colombia had the better chance in winning the game. David Luiz was systematically trying to injure James Rodríguez by fouling him six times and the ref never once pulled out a card. This is the worst ref I have seen in the last 10 years... When I saw FIFA congratulating the referee because he had such a great game, I asked myself, ‘What the f**k? What game were they watching?’ They probably mistook this game for a baseball game or a bullfight because they didn't watch this [Brazil-Colombia] game."

— Diego Maradona criticising the refereeing of the game.

Filled with controversy, the quarter-final between Brazil and Colombia saw a record number of fouls for a match in this World Cup (31 committed by Brazil and 23 by Colombia, totalling 54, with only 4 yellow cards), including one committed by Colombian defender Juan Camilo Zúñiga as he kneed Brazilian forward Neymar in the back in the 88th minute, which resulted in the striker's withdrawal from the match. The action was not punished with a card nor even a foul. Subsequent medical evaluation discovered a fractured vertebra, forcing the Brazilian to miss the remainder of the tournament. After the match, which Colombia lost 2–1, Zúñiga insisted that he had not meant to injure Neymar. Neymar's teammate Thiago Silva defended Zúñiga, stating that he is not the type of player who would purposely cause an injury to any player. On 5 July, it was revealed that Zúñiga had sent a letter of apology to Neymar, saying that he was "deeply sorry and sad" for unintentionally causing the injury. On the other hand, Ronaldo believed that Zúñiga intended to hurt Neymar, saying that the very high knee in the back was violent and an unlawful move.

Many media and football figures, such as Diego Maradona, criticised FIFA and the Spanish referee Carlos Velasco Carballo, claiming "favouritism" towards Brazil, for disallowing a goal scored by Colombian defender Mario Yepes and allowing too many fouls by the Brazilians to occur without punishment, leading the Colombians to play aggressively as well. There have been arguments that had Carballo properly controlled the game, fewer fouls (as well as Neymar's injury) may have occurred.

Despite the controversy, Colombia were awarded the FIFA Fair Play Trophy for the tournament.

=== Brazil vs Netherlands ===
In the second minute of the match for third place, Thiago Silva pulled down Arjen Robben as he ran into Júlio César's box with the ball for a clear goal-scoring opportunity. Under IFAB laws, Silva ought to have been shown a red card, but he was shown a yellow card instead by the Algerian referee Djamel Haimoudi. The referee called for a penalty, while the foul happened outside the box, which was eventually scored by Robin van Persie. The Netherlands' second goal in the 16th minute was later shown to be offside, which was ignored by the referees. Haimoudi had another controversial call in the 67th minute when he showed Brazilian midfielder Oscar a yellow card for diving, the only such instance in this tournament when replays showed that he was taken down in the box by opponent Daley Blind.

=== Germany vs Argentina ===
In the second half of the final, German goalkeeper Manuel Neuer collided with Gonzalo Higuaín in mid-air while trying to punch the ball out inside the penalty box. Referee Nicola Rizzoli decided against the call for a penalty kick, and concluded that Gonzalo Higuain had fouled Neuer, so he gave Germany a free-kick. Some people felt Neuer should have been shown a red card and Argentina awarded a penalty.

== Safety ==
=== Construction ===
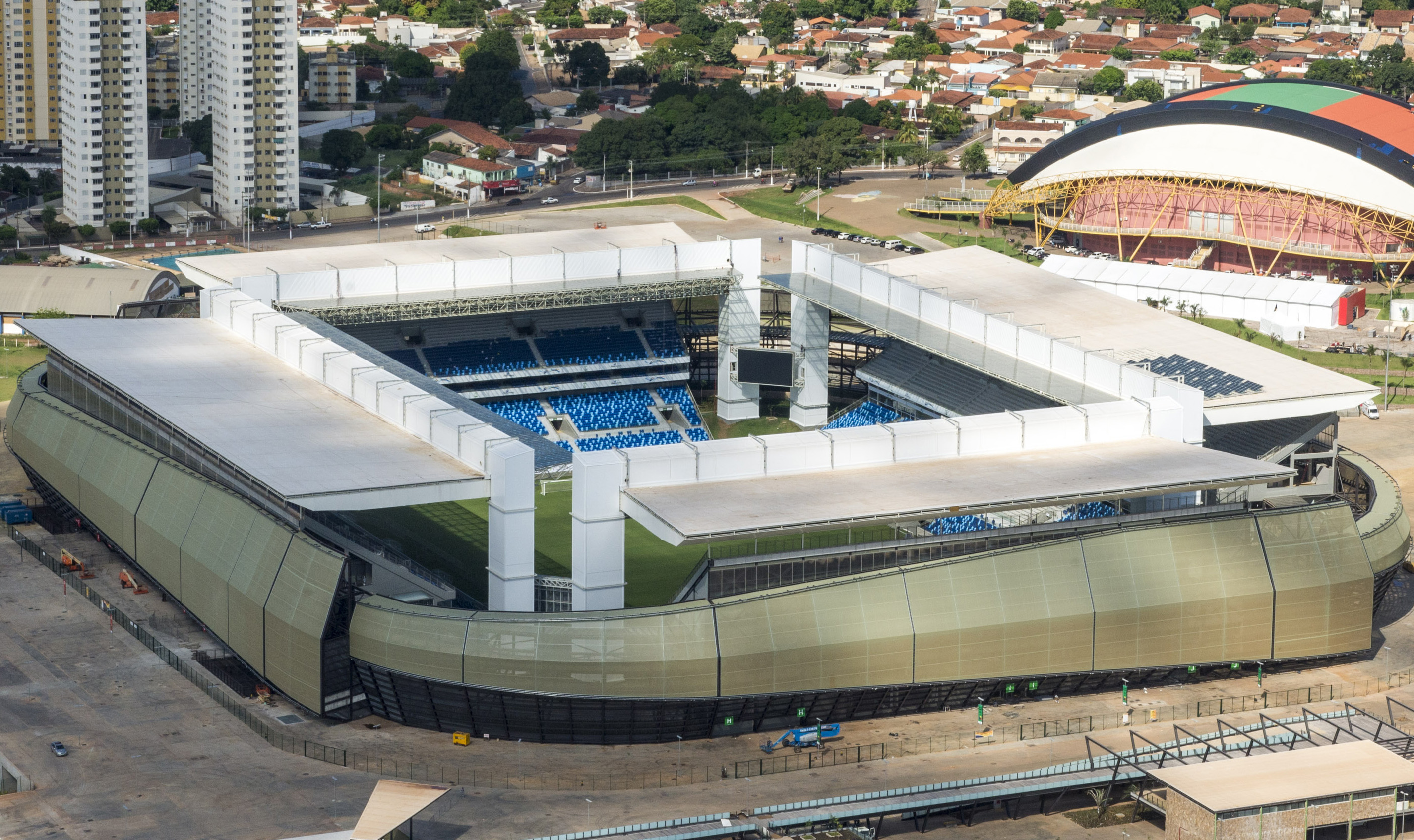
A fire broke out at the Arena Pantanal in Cuiabá in October 2013

Stadium construction for the 2014 World Cup was plagued by accidents, cost overruns and delays, with eight workers dying in various accidents while building the World Cup's 12 arenas. In late October 2013, a fire during construction of the Arena Pantanal at Cuiabá in Mato Grosso state came 24 hours after the state governor warned the stadium might not be 100 percent complete in time for the deadline. Footage also emerged of fans climbing what appeared to be an unstable staircase made with scaffolding leading to the Maracanã Stadium, before the Argentina–Bosnia and Herzegovina match.

=== Breaches into stadiums ===
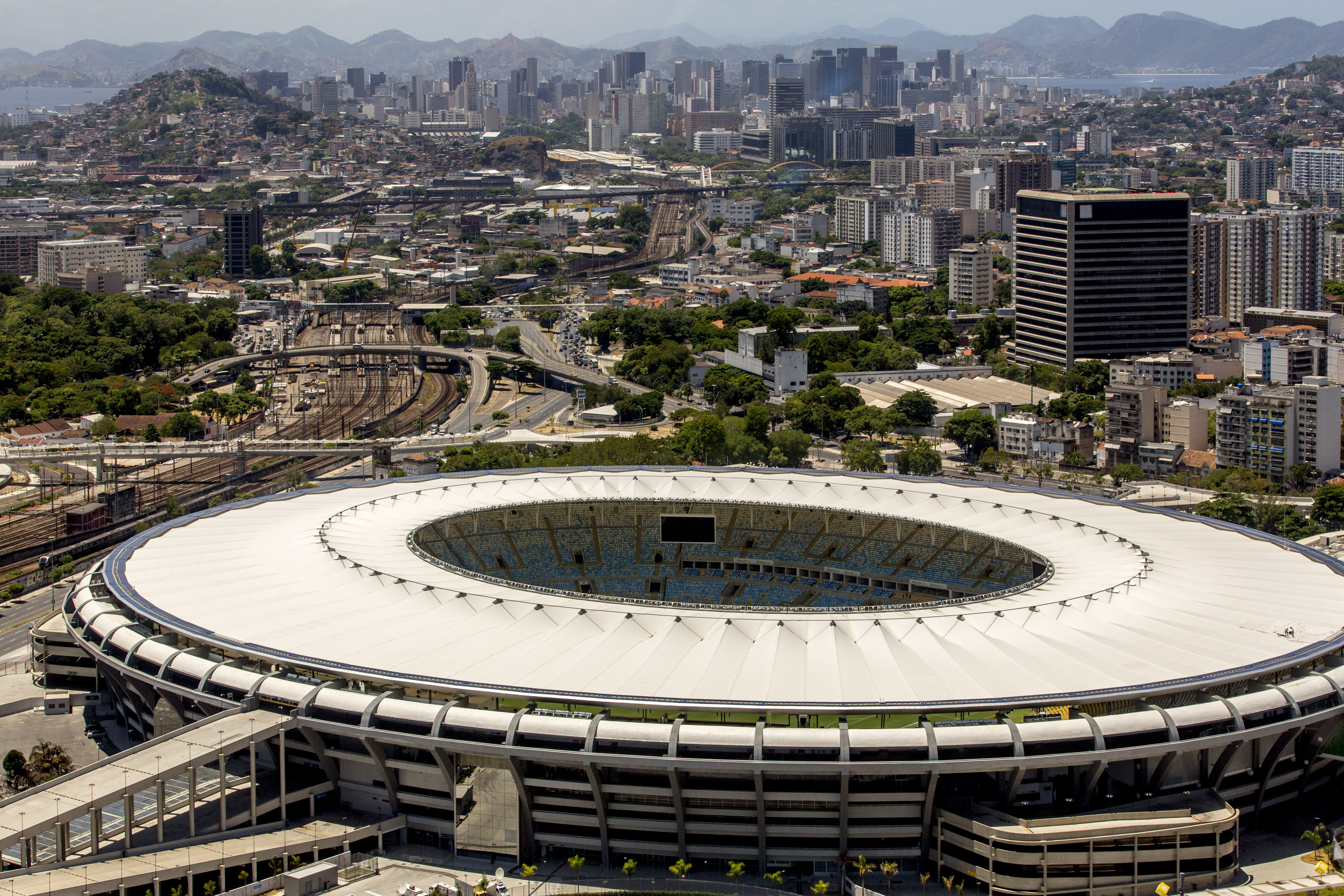
The Maracanã Stadium in Rio de Janeiro

At Chile's Group B match against Spain on 18 June, about 100 Chilean supporters who had gathered outside Maracanã Stadium forced their way in. They broke through security, after one fan pretended to be sick to distract the guard. They proceeded into the media centre, smashed the glass door, knocked over two partition walls and entered the stadium. Military police reported that 85 Chileans were detained during the events, while others had reached the stands. Earlier, on 15 June, about 20 Argentinians made a similar breach during the Argentina–Bosnia and Herzegovina match at the same stadium.

=== Violence between England fans ===
On 19 June during England's match against Uruguay in São Paulo, an England football supporter was assaulted and had a piece of his ear bitten off by another England fan, British police reported. Brazilian officers started an investigation after the attacked fan made a complaint, but the assailant could not be identified. The confirmation of the incident came after former England striker Stan Collymore tweeted that he had seen footage of a "fan attacked". The Association of Chief Police Officers issued a statement, following Collymore's tweet, with Chief Superintendent Rachel Barber of South Yorkshire Police saying, "Efforts are ongoing to identify the suspect and bring him to justice either in the UK or, if possible, back in Brazil where the offence occurred".

=== Monorail collapse ===
On 9 June, three days before the World Cup started, a concrete support beam collapsed during construction of Line 17 of the São Paulo Metro, killing one worker and injuring two others. Completion for the line, which would connect Congonhas-São Paulo Airport to three other lines in the monorail network, was scheduled for the start of the tournament, but construction was delayed as it did not receive environmental approvals, and was expected to be completed by the second half of 2015.

=== Bridge collapse ===
On 3 July, an overpass under construction in Belo Horizonte as part of the World Cup infrastructure projects collapsed onto a busy carriageway below, leaving two people dead and 22 others injured. One witness blamed the accelerated construction schedules and the "incompetence" of the authorities and businesses for the disaster.

=== Head injuries ===
During the tournament, FIFA received significant criticism for the way head injuries are handled during matches. Two incidents in particular attracted the most attention. First, in a group stage match, after Uruguayan defender Álvaro Pereira received a blow to the head, he lay unconscious. The Uruguayan doctor signalled for the player to be substituted, but he returned to the match. The incident drew criticism from the professional players' union FIFPro, and from Michel D'Hooghe, a member of the FIFA executive board and chairman of its medical committee.

Second, in the final, German midfielder Christoph Kramer received a blow to the head from a collision in the 14th minute, but returned to the match before collapsing in the 31st minute. During that time, Kramer was disoriented and confused, and asked the referee Nicola Rizzoli whether the match he was playing was in the World Cup Final.

== Aftermath ==
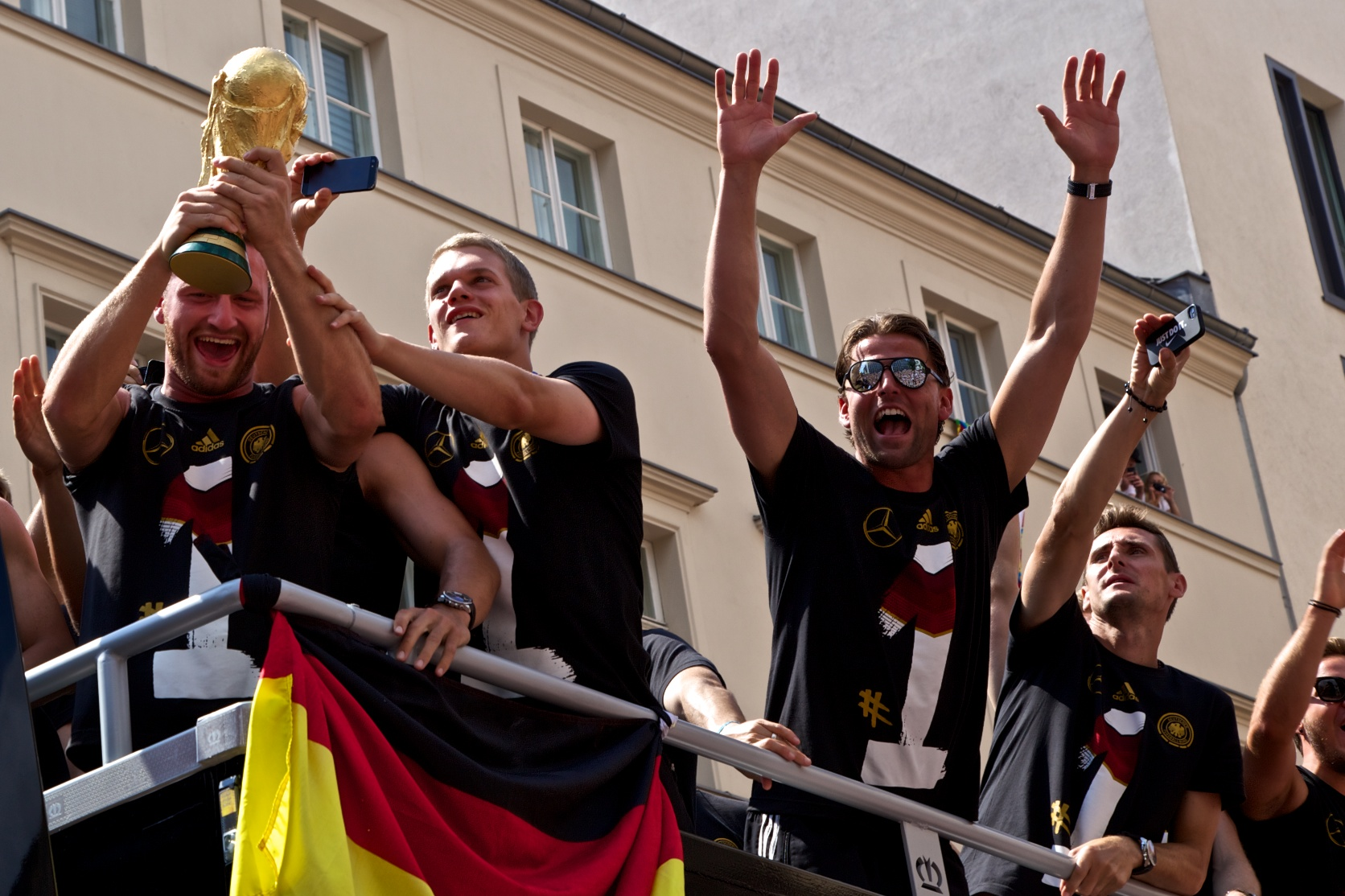
Behaviour by some members of the victorious German team in their celebration in Berlin was deemed disrespectful by media in Argentina

There was controversy over Germany's victory celebration, which included a parody of the Argentina Gaucho. This event was later termed as "Gauchogate".

As the national team arrived to the fan zone at the Brandenburg Gate in Berlin on 15 July 2014, six players, Roman Weidenfeller, Shkodran Mustafi, André Schürrle, Miroslav Klose, Mario Götze and Toni Kroos sang a victory song with the chorus of nursery rhyme it I know a cowboy, the cowboy is called Bill. They modified it and sang, "That's how the Gauchos go, the gauchos go like that" in a stooped posture. When changing to the second verse they took a more upright posture and sang, "and that's how the Germans go, the Germans go like that". Just a few hours later, the name Gauchogate went viral on Twitter for the response to this action.

Many German newspapers criticised the celebration in the press. Die Zeit ran an article with the title "Embarrassing appearance at victory party", Die Welt called it a "crazy idea", Die Tageszeitung called it "disrespectful", and Faz.net said the celebration was "a gigantic own goal". The critics ranged from appeasement, that it was only a harmless song being sung in the intoxication of joy, to the classification as a mockery of the World Cup final opponent by calling their people short and Germans "superior". The Argentine sports newspaper Olé described the scene as a real controversy. Sports journalist Víctor Hugo Morales, through Radio Continental in Buenos Aires, called the six players who danced, "disgusting Nazis".

German Football Association president Wolfgang Niersbach said the dance wasn't meant to be "disrespectful", also adding that it was instead a "spontaneous expression of happiness" from the players.

With a debate already on here about the return of patriotism in a nation long uncomfortable with the notion in the years after World War II, the inference landed like a bomb. After the Germans generally held themselves with grace in victory after their 7-1 thrashing of Brazil in the semi-final, for some, the grandstanding put more than a little tarnish on Germany's glistening trophy, generating outrage as well as outright charges of racism.

— Anthony Faiola

Germans, according to themselves, look from above. They are a different race...

— Olé

== See also ==
- 2014 FIFA World Cup discipline
