= Jaam-e Jam =

Jaam-e Jam or variants may refer to:

- Cup of Jamshid (Persian: جام جم, jām-e Jam), a cup of divination in Persian mythology
- Jam-e-jam, a newspaper published in Fars, Iran
- Jam-e Jam (newspaper), a Persian-language daily newspaper published in Iran
- Jam-e-Jamshed, a weekly newspaper published in Mumbai, India
- Jame Jam TV, Iranian TV channel airing programs for the Iranian diaspora
- Jaam-e-Jam (TV channel), a Persian-language TV channel based in Los Angeles, US
- Jam-e-Jam Television Festival, television festival held since 2011 by the Islamic Republic of Iran Broadcasting
- Jaam-e-Jam or Iran TV Network (Canada), Canadian Persian-language specialty channel
