= Alexander Mejía =

Colombian footballer (born 1988)

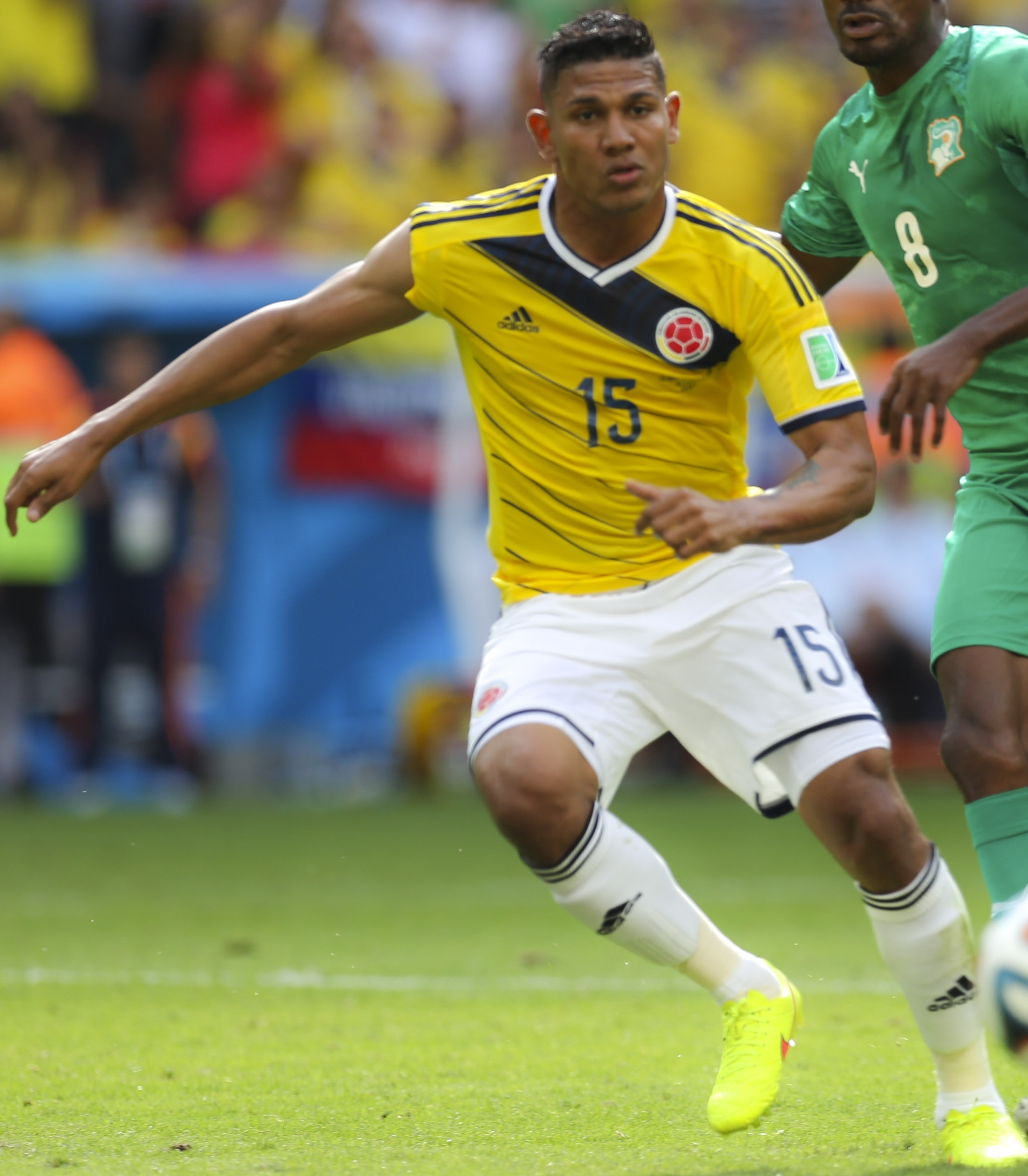
- Mejía with Colombia at the 2014 FIFA World Cup

Personal information
- Full name: Alexander Mejía Sabalza
- Date of birth: 11 July 1988 (age 38)
- Place of birth: Barranquilla, Atlántico, Colombia
- Height: 1.72 m (5 ft 8 in)
- Position: Midfielder

Senior career*
Years	Team	Apps	(Gls)
2005–2012	Deportes Quindío	101	(4)
2011	→ Once Caldas (loan)	37	(0)
2012–2014	Atlético Nacional	88	(0)
2015–2016	Monterrey	14	(0)
2015–2016	→ Atlético Nacional (loan)	40	(0)
2016–2018	León	63	(0)
2019–2021	Libertad	65	(0)
2021–2022	Santa Fe	11	(0)
2022–2023	Atlético Nacional	13	(1)
2023	Unión Magdalena	7	(0)
2024	Deportivo Cali	32	(0)

International career^{‡}
2012–2022	Colombia	27	(0)
- * Club domestic league appearances and goals as of 14 November 2024 ‡ National team caps and goals as of 22:08, 27 January 2022 (UTC)

Alexander Mejía Sabalza (born 11 July 1988) is a Colombian former professional footballer who played as a midfielder. He is described by FIFA's official website as "a linchpin noted for his ability to tidy up mistakes, rob possession and track down and pressurize opponents".

== Club career ==
=== Colombia ===
Mejía made his professional debut for Deportes Quindío in 2005, where he played for seven years, including a loan spell at Once Caldas. In 2012, he joined Atlético Nacional and won both the Copa Colombia and the Superliga Colombiana in his first season. In the following seasons, Mejía helped Nacional to three consecutive Colombian league titles, becoming team captain after the departure of Macnelly Torres.

=== Mexico ===
Mejía finished his loan at Nacional in June 2016. He was then transferred to León in the Liga MX for the Apertura 2016. However, as a part of the deal, he was able to stay with Nacional until after the Medellín club had finished its campaign in the Copa Libertadores.

=== Libertad ===
On 29 December 2018, Mejia joined Club Libertad of Paraguay on a free transfer for two years.

== International career ==
In 2012, Mejía made his debut for the Colombia national team in a FIFA World Cup qualifier against Peru. He went on to become a regular member of the squad in the remainder of the campaign, making five appearances overall.

=== 2014 World Cup ===
On 9 June 2014, he was named in Colombia's squad for the 2014 FIFA World Cup, and played in four of the five matches Colombia had. On 14 June, Mejía appeared as a sixty-ninth-minute substitute in Colombia's opening match of the tournament, a 3–0 victory over Greece in Belo Horizonte, Minas Gerais, Brazil. Mejía also appeared in the following match against Ivory Coast on 19 June 2014, coming on as a substitute in the seventy-ninth minute, and seeing out a 2–1 victory in Brazil's capital, Brasília. In Colombia's third – and last – game of the Group Stage, they played against Japan. Mejía started at a defensive midfielder role alongside Fredy Guarín, playing the entire eighty-minute game. Colombia won 1–4. Mejía's last game of the 2014 World Cup came against Uruguay in the Round of 16 in the Maracanã Stadium, Rio de Janeiro on 28 June. Colombia won 2–0, and progressed to the Quarter-finals, playing against the hosts, Brazil, losing 2–1.

== Season statistics ==
Domestic club statistics
Club	Season	League			Cup (Note: Appearances in the Copa Colombia and Copa MX)		Continental (Note: Includes appearances in the Copa Libertadores and the Copa Sudamericana)		Other (Note: Appearances only in the Superliga Colombiana)		Total	
Club	Season	Division	Apps	Goals	Apps	Goals	Apps	Goals	Apps	Goals	Apps	Goals
Atlético Nacional	2012	Categoría Primera A	27	0	11	0	8	0	2	0	48	0
Atlético Nacional	2013	Categoría Primera A	36	0	4	0	8	0	—		48	0
Atlético Nacional	2014	Categoría Primera A	19	0	2	0	10	0	2	0	33	0
Atlético Nacional (loan)	2015	Categoría Primera A	23	0	1	0	0	0	—		24	0
Atlético Nacional (loan)	2016	Categoría Primera A	17	0	1	0	12	0	1	0	31	0
Atlético Nacional (loan)	Total		122	0	19	0	38	0	5	0	184	0
Monterrey	2014–15	Liga MX	14	0	3	0	—				17	0
León	2016–17	Liga MX	23	0	3	1	—				26	1
León	2017–18	Liga MX	25	0	4	0	—				29	0
León	2018–19	Liga MX	10	0	5	0	—				15	0
León	Total		74	0	12	1	—				86	1
Career total			196	0	31	1	38	0	5	0	270	1

== Honours ==
=== Club ===
Atlético Nacional

- Categoría Primera A
  - Winner: 2013-I, 2013-II, 2014-I
- Copa Colombia
  - Winner: 2012, 2013
- Superliga Colombiana
  - Winner: 2012
- Copa Libertadores
  - Winner: 2016
