= Arena das Dunas =

Football stadium in Natal, Brazil

Coordinates: 5.8269°S 35.2124°W

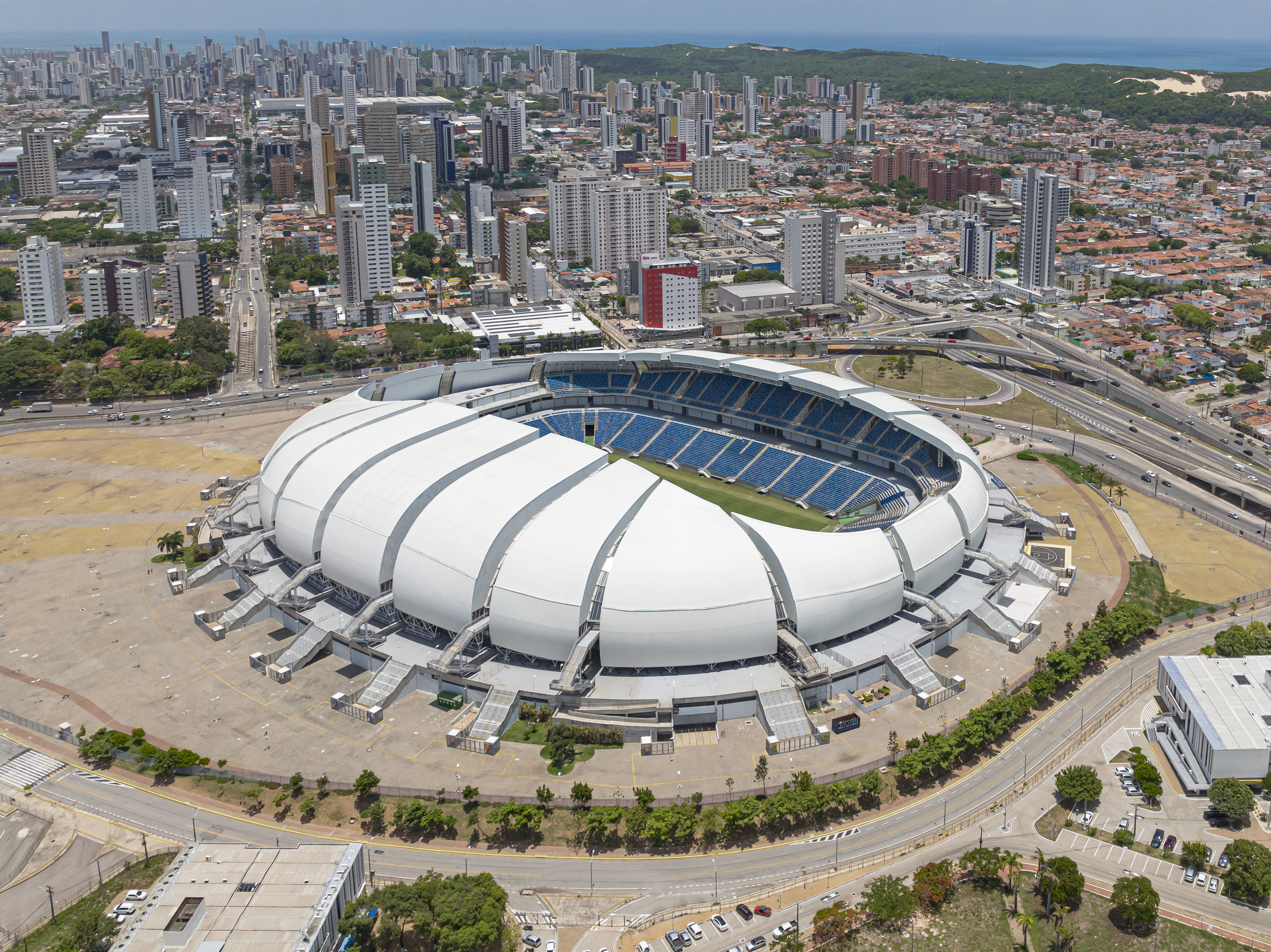
- Sisbrace
- Interactive map of Arena das Dunas
- Full name: Arena das Dunas
- Location: Centro Administrativo Rio Grande do Norte, Lagoa Nova, Natal, Brazil
- Owner: OAS Arenas
- Operator: OAS Arenas
- Capacity: 31,375
- Executive suites: 39
- Field size: 105 x 68 m

Construction
- Built: 2011–2013
- Opened: 26 January 2014
- Cost: R$ 400 million € 110.1 million
- Architect: Populous

Tenant
- América-RN

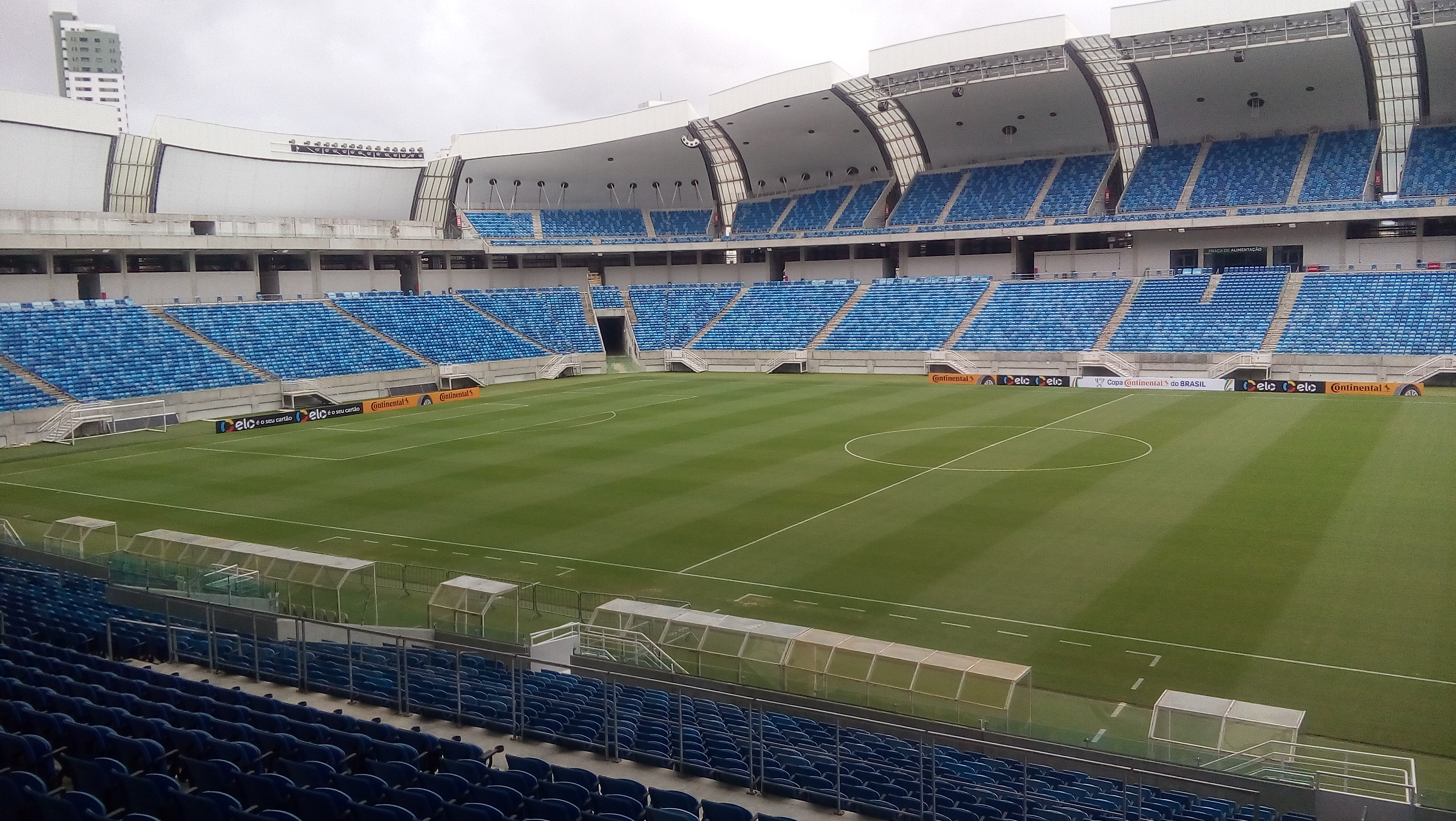
The interior of the Arena das Dunas.

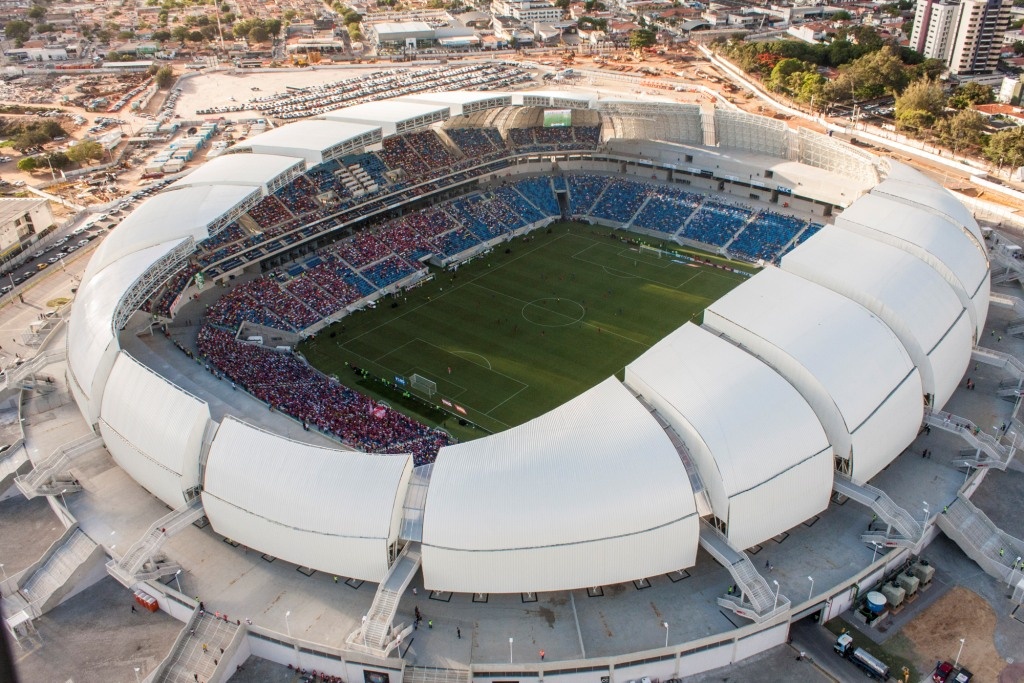
An aerial view of the Arena das Dunas.

The Arena das Dunas ("Dunes Arena") is a football stadium in Natal, Brazil. It has a capacity of 31,375 spectators, and was designed by sports architect Christopher Lee of Populous. The stadium hosted football matches for the 2014 FIFA World Cup held in Brazil. During the tournament, it had a seating capacity of 42,000. It was built in place of the Machadão, which was demolished in 2011.

This project replaced an old project called "Estádio Estrela dos Reis Magos" that would have been located in the neighbouring municipality of Parnamirim. In the new project, a shopping centre and commercial buildings, hotels of international standard and an artificial lake around the stadium will be built.

The stadium is located by the Senador Salgado Filho Avenue (BR-101 highway), a multi-lane road already served by the Complexo Viário do Quarto Centenário (Fourth Centennial Complex road or Complexo Viário Senador Carlos Alberto de Sousa). The project received high praise from FIFA inspectors.

== 2014 FIFA World Cup ==
Date	Time (UTC-03)	Team #1	Result	Team #2	Round	Attendance
June 13, 2014	13:00	Mexico	1–0	Cameroon	Group A	39,216
June 16, 2014	19:00	Ghana	1–2	United States	Group G	39,760
June 19, 2014	19:00	Japan	0–0	Greece	Group C	39,485
June 24, 2014	13:00	Italy	0–1	Uruguay	Group D	39,706

== Brazil national football team ==
Date	Time (UTC-03)	Team #1	Res.	Team #2	Round	Attendance
October 6, 2016	21:45	Brazil	5–0	Bolivia	2018 FIFA World Cup qualification	40,013

== See also ==
- List of football stadiums in Brazil
- Lists of stadiums
