= 2014 FIFA World Cup Group D =

Football world cup group

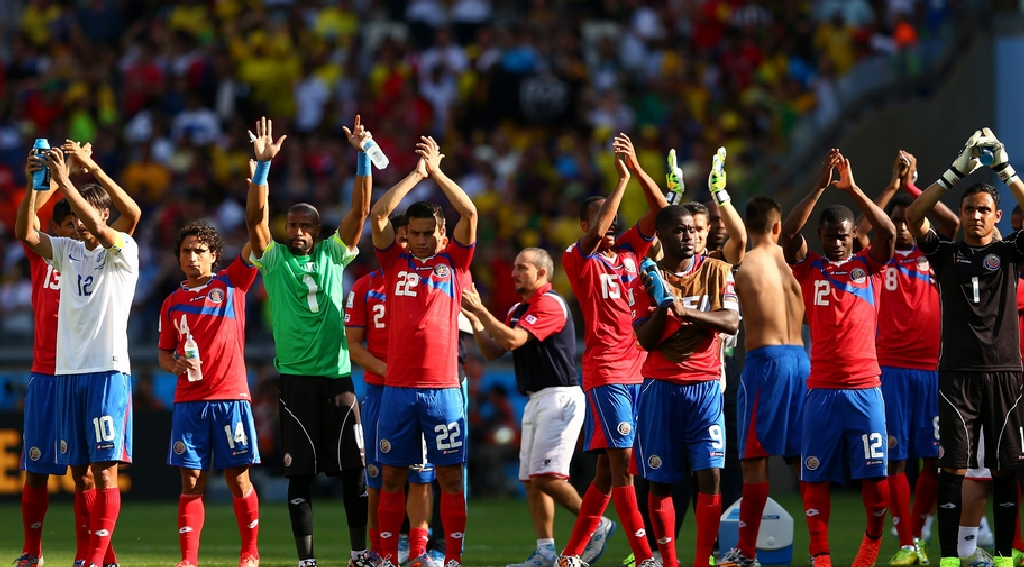
Costa Rica celebrating after topping the group

Group D of the 2014 FIFA World Cup consisted of Uruguay, Costa Rica, England and Italy. It was the only group to contain more than one previous winner of the World Cup, as well as the only group in the history of the FIFA World Cup to contain three former world champions. It was also the only group with three top 10 FIFA World Ranking teams as of October 2013 (ranking date for final draw) and at the start of the competition. These unique characteristics made this group to be widely considered as one of the tournament's three groups of death (along with Groups B and G), and among the "toughest" and "most memorable" groups of death in FIFA World Cup history.

Play began on 14 June and ended on 24 June 2014. Costa Rica topped the group undefeated, despite being considered underdogs and expected to finish last in a group containing three former winners of the competition. Of those three, Uruguay qualified second, thereby eliminating Italy and England.

== Teams ==
| Draw position | Team | Confederation | Method of qualification | Date of qualification | Finals appearance | Last appearance | Previous best performance | FIFA Rankings | |
| Draw position | Team | Confederation | Method of qualification | Date of qualification | Finals appearance | Last appearance | Previous best performance | October 2013 (Note: The rankings of October 2013 were used for seeding for the final draw.) | June 2014 |
|---|---|---|---|---|---|---|---|---|---|
| D1 (seed) | Uruguay | CONMEBOL | AFC vs CONMEBOL play-off winners | 20 November 2013 | 12th | 2010 | Winners (1930, 1950) | 6 | 7 |
| D2 | Costa Rica | CONCACAF | CONCACAF fourth round runners-up | 10 September 2013 | 4th | 2006 | Round of 16 (1990) | 31 | 28 |
| D3 | England | UEFA | UEFA Group H winners | 15 October 2013 | 14th | 2010 | Winners (1966) | 10 | 10 |
| D4 | Italy | UEFA | UEFA Group B winners | 10 September 2013 | 18th | 2010 | Winners (1934, 1938, 1982, 2006) | 9 | 9 |

== Standings ==
| Pos | Team | Pld | W | D | L | GF | GA | GD | Pts | Qualification |
|---|---|---|---|---|---|---|---|---|---|---|
| 1 | Costa Rica | 3 | 2 | 1 | 0 | 4 | 1 | +3 | 7 | Advance to knockout stage |
| 2 | Uruguay | 3 | 2 | 0 | 1 | 4 | 4 | 0 | 6 | Advance to knockout stage |
| 3 | Italy | 3 | 1 | 0 | 2 | 2 | 3 | −1 | 3 | |
| 4 | England | 3 | 0 | 1 | 2 | 2 | 4 | −2 | 1 | |

Source: FIFA
Rules for classification: Tie-breaking criteria
- Costa Rica advanced to play Greece (runner-up of Group C) in the round of 16.
- Uruguay advanced to play Colombia (winner of Group C) in the round of 16.

== Matches ==
=== Uruguay vs Costa Rica ===
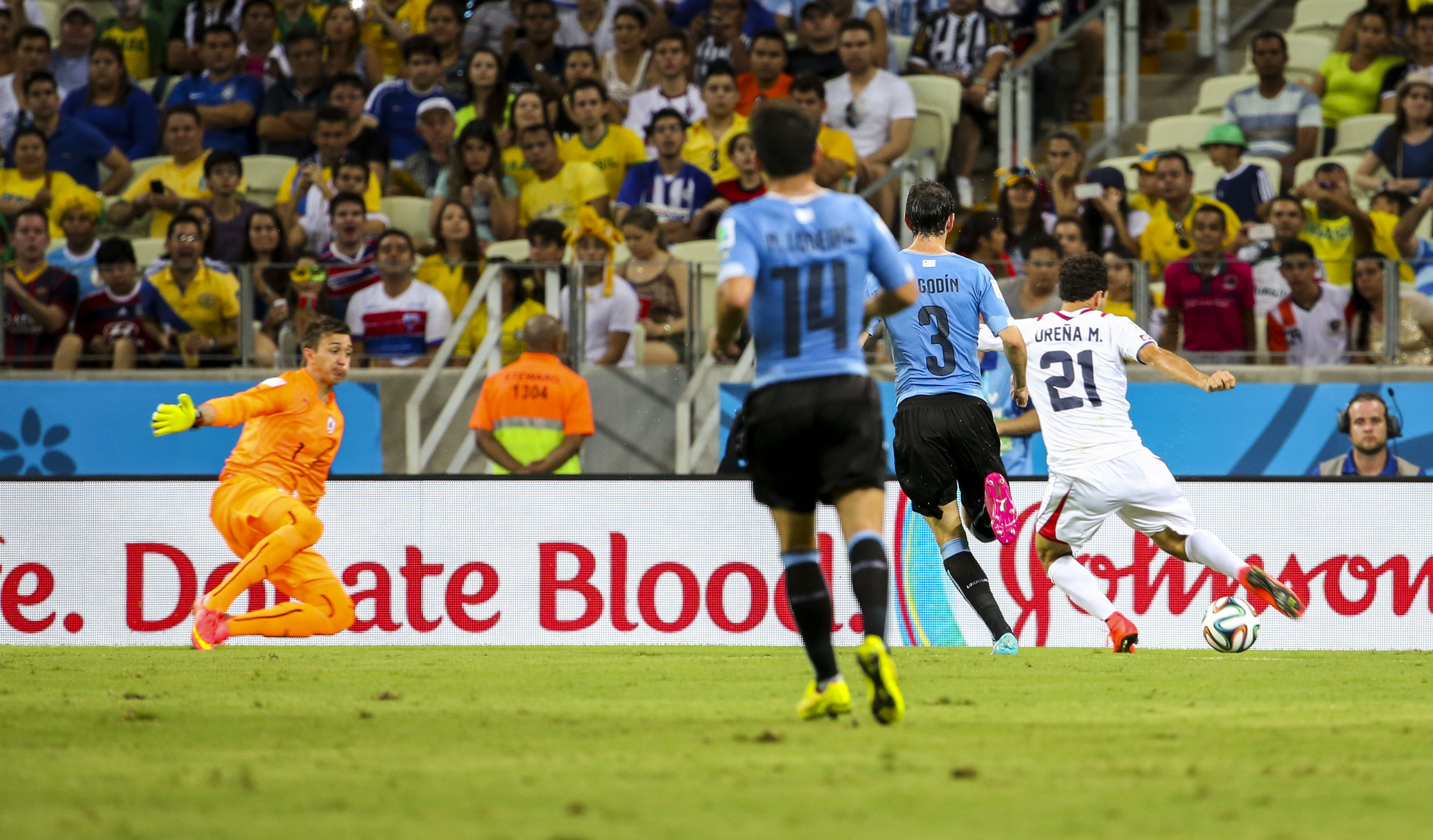
Instant before Marco Ureña's goal

The two teams had met in 10 previous matches, most recently in 2009 in the CONCACAF – CONMEBOL play-off, won by Uruguay 2–1 on aggregate to qualify for the 2010 FIFA World Cup.

Uruguay led the game 1–0 at half time, through an Edinson Cavani penalty after Diego Lugano was pulled down in the box by Júnior Díaz. Keylor Navas prevented Uruguay's lead from doubling by tipping over Diego Forlán's shot. In the second half, Joel Campbell equalised with a low shot to the right corner when the ball fell to him in the box after a deep cross from Cristian Gamboa on the right. Soon afterwards, Costa Rica went into the lead when Óscar Duarte scored with a low diving header to the right corner after a free kick from Christian Bolaños. A pass from Campbell allowed substitute Marco Ureña to make it 3–1 with a low shot from a tight angle on the right, and in injury time Maxi Pereira was given a straight red card for a kick at Campbell.

It was the first time Costa Rica scored three goals in a World Cup match, and also the first time that Uruguay lost to a non-South American or non-European country in the World Cup.

14 June 2014
16:00 BRT (UTC−3)

| Uruguay | 1–3 | Costa Rica |
|---|---|---|
| Cavani 24' (pen.) | | Campbell 54'; Duarte 57'; Ureña 84' |

Estádio Castelão, Fortaleza
Attendance: 58,679
Referee: Felix Brych (Germany)

| Uruguay | Costa Rica |

| GK | 1 | Fernando Muslera |
| RB | 16 | Maxi Pereira | (red card) 90+4' |
| CB | 2 | Diego Lugano (c) | (yellow card) 50' |
| CB | 3 | Diego Godín |
| LB | 22 | Martín Cáceres | (yellow card) 81' |
| RM | 11 | Christian Stuani |
| CM | 17 | Egidio Arévalo |
| CM | 5 | Walter Gargano | (yellow card) 56' | (substituted off) 60' |
| LM | 7 | Cristian Rodríguez | | (substituted off) 76' |
| CF | 10 | Diego Forlán | | (substituted off) 60' |
| CF | 21 | Edinson Cavani |
Substitutions:
| MF | 14 | Nicolás Lodeiro | | (substituted on) 60' |
| MF | 20 | Álvaro González | | (substituted on) 60' |
| FW | 8 | Abel Hernández | | (substituted on) 76' |
Manager:
Óscar Tabárez

| GK | 1 | Keylor Navas |
| CB | 6 | Óscar Duarte |
| CB | 3 | Giancarlo González |
| CB | 4 | Michael Umaña |
| RWB | 16 | Cristian Gamboa |
| LWB | 15 | Júnior Díaz |
| CM | 5 | Celso Borges |
| CM | 17 | Yeltsin Tejeda | (substituted off) 75' |
| AM | 10 | Bryan Ruiz (c) | (substituted off) 83' |
| AM | 7 | Christian Bolaños | (substituted off) 89' |
| CF | 9 | Joel Campbell |
Substitutions:
| MF | 22 | José Miguel Cubero | (substituted on) 75' |
| FW | 21 | Marco Ureña | (substituted on) 83' |
| MF | 11 | Michael Barrantes | (substituted on) 89' |
Manager:
(Colombia) Jorge Luis Pinto

Man of the Match:
Joel Campbell (Costa Rica)

Assistant referees:
Mark Borsch (Germany)
Stefan Lupp (Germany)
Fourth official:
Víctor Hugo Carrillo (Peru)
Fifth official:
Rodney Aquino (Paraguay)

=== England vs Italy ===
The two teams had met in 24 previous matches, including in the 1990 FIFA World Cup match for third place, won by Italy 2–1. Their most recent competitive meeting was in the UEFA Euro 2012 quarter-finals, won by Italy on penalties after a scoreless draw.

Italy went ahead first, when from a short corner, Andrea Pirlo dummied Marco Verratti's pass, and Claudio Marchisio scored with a low right footed shot from outside the penalty box. England quickly equalised through a close-range Daniel Sturridge goal from a Wayne Rooney cross from the left. The scores were level at 1–1 at half time, but Mario Balotelli headed Italy's winner from close range five minutes after play resumed from a cross by Antonio Candreva on the right.

The England physiotherapist Gary Lewin was stretchered off with a dislocated ankle suffered in the celebrations for England's goal, which ruled him out for the rest of the World Cup. With Italy going out in the group stages after losing against both Costa Rica and Uruguay by identical 1-0 scorelines after having previously done so in 2010 (drawing 1-1 vs both Paraguay and New Zealand after conceding the first goal of both games before trailing 2-0 and 3-1 in an eventual 3-2 defeat vs Slovakia in that tournament), then failing to qualify for the next three tournaments, this remains the latest World Cup match Italy scored a goal in, and would be the only World Cup match since winning 2006 they didn’t trail at any point and won in, which also makes it the only match they scored the first goal and held a lead at any point.

14 June 2014
18:00 AMT (UTC−4)

| England | 1–2 | Italy |
|---|---|---|
| Sturridge 37' | | Marchisio 35'; Balotelli 50' |

Arena da Amazônia, Manaus
Attendance: 39,800
Referee: Björn Kuipers (Netherlands)

| England | Italy |

| GK | 1 | Joe Hart |
| RB | 2 | Glen Johnson |
| CB | 5 | Gary Cahill |
| CB | 6 | Phil Jagielka |
| LB | 3 | Leighton Baines |
| CM | 4 | Steven Gerrard (c) |
| CM | 14 | Jordan Henderson | | (substituted off) 73' |
| RW | 11 | Danny Welbeck | | (substituted off) 61' |
| AM | 19 | Raheem Sterling | (yellow card) 90+2' |
| LW | 10 | Wayne Rooney |
| CF | 9 | Daniel Sturridge | | (substituted off) 80' |
Substitutions:
| MF | 21 | Ross Barkley | | (substituted on) 61' |
| MF | 7 | Jack Wilshere | | (substituted on) 73' |
| MF | 20 | Adam Lallana | | (substituted on) 80' |
Manager:
Roy Hodgson

| GK | 12 | Salvatore Sirigu |
| RB | 4 | Matteo Darmian |
| CB | 15 | Andrea Barzagli |
| CB | 20 | Gabriel Paletta |
| LB | 3 | Giorgio Chiellini |
| RM | 8 | Claudio Marchisio |
| CM | 16 | Daniele De Rossi |
| LM | 23 | Marco Verratti | (substituted off) 57' |
| AM | 21 | Andrea Pirlo (c) |
| SS | 6 | Antonio Candreva | (substituted off) 79' |
| CF | 9 | Mario Balotelli | (substituted off) 73' |
Substitutions:
| MF | 5 | Thiago Motta | (substituted on) 57' |
| FW | 17 | Ciro Immobile | (substituted on) 73' |
| MF | 18 | Marco Parolo | (substituted on) 79' |
Manager:
Cesare Prandelli

Man of the Match:
Mario Balotelli (Italy)

Assistant referees:
Sander van Roekel (Netherlands)
Erwin Zeinstra (Netherlands)
Fourth official:
Walter López (Guatemala)
Fifth official:
Leonel Leal (Costa Rica)

=== Uruguay vs England ===
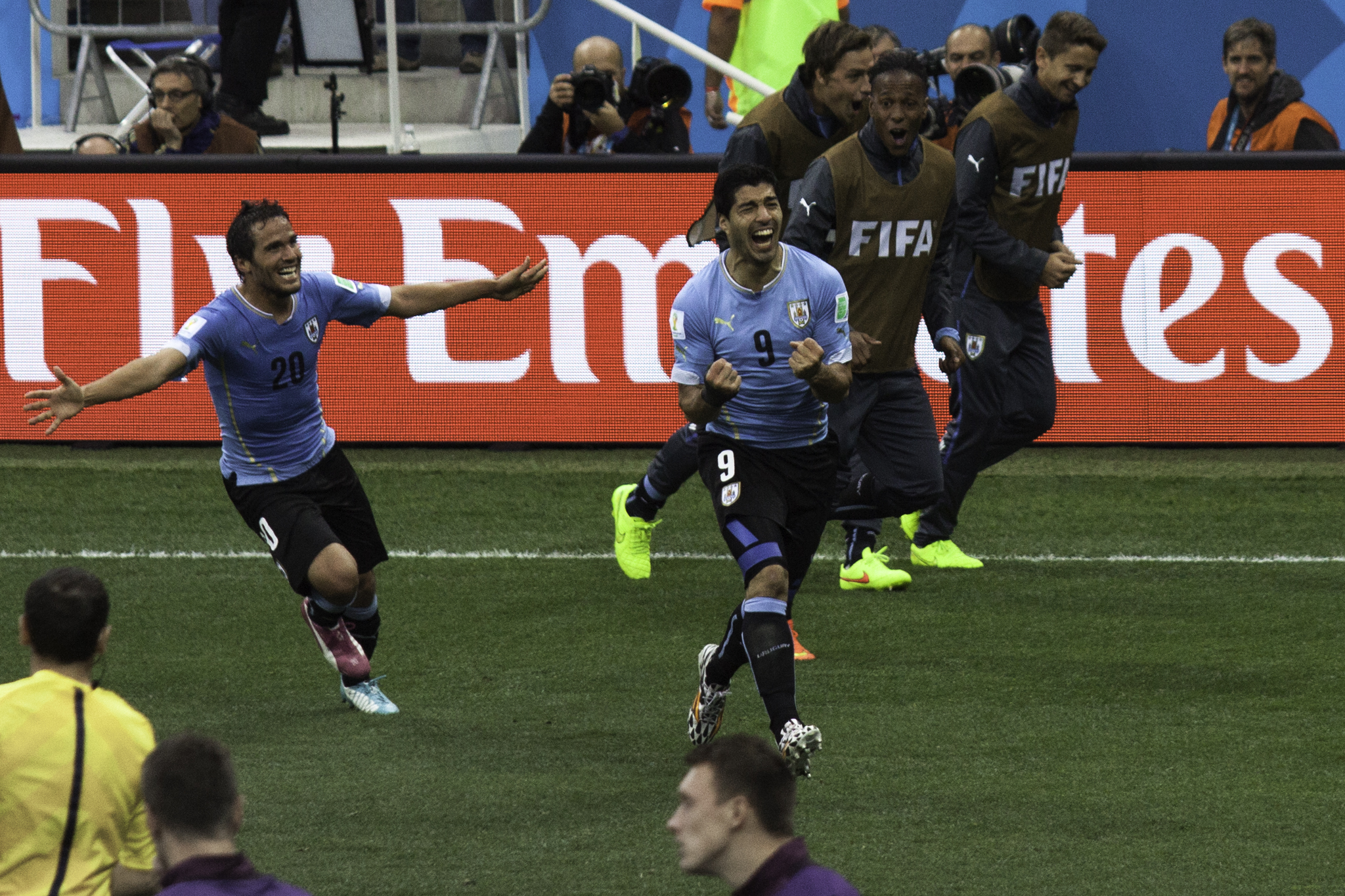
Suárez celebrating one of his goals

The two teams had met in ten previous matches, including twice in the FIFA World Cup (1954, quarter-finals: Uruguay 4–2 England; 1966, group stage: Uruguay 0–0 England). Uruguay defender Maxi Pereira was suspended for the match, after being sent off in the team's match against Costa Rica.

Uruguay took the lead in the first half, the goal headed in by Luis Suárez from a cross by Edinson Cavani on the left. England equalised in the second half, when Wayne Rooney scored his first and only World Cup goal with a tap-in from a cross by Glen Johnson from the right. Suárez later secured Uruguay's victory, receiving the ball from goalkeeper Fernando Muslera's clearance which flicked off Steven Gerrard, and shot home his second goal of the match powerfully with his right foot.

This was the first time that England lost three World Cup Finals matches in a row, dating back to England's loss to Germany in the 2010 World Cup round of 16.

19 June 2014
16:00 BRT (UTC−3)

| Uruguay | 2–1 | England |
|---|---|---|
| Suárez 39', 85' | | Rooney 75' |

Arena de São Paulo, São Paulo
Attendance: 62,575
Referee: Carlos Velasco Carballo (Spain)

| Uruguay | England |

| GK | 1 | Fernando Muslera |
| RB | 22 | Martín Cáceres |
| CB | 13 | José Giménez |
| CB | 3 | Diego Godín (c) | (yellow card) 9' |
| LB | 6 | Álvaro Pereira |
| CM | 20 | Álvaro González | | (substituted off) 79' |
| CM | 17 | Egidio Arévalo |
| CM | 7 | Cristian Rodríguez |
| AM | 14 | Nicolás Lodeiro | | (substituted off) 67' |
| CF | 9 | Luis Suárez | | (substituted off) 88' |
| CF | 21 | Edinson Cavani |
Substitutions:
| FW | 11 | Christian Stuani | | (substituted on) 67' |
| DF | 4 | Jorge Fucile | | (substituted on) 79' |
| DF | 19 | Sebastián Coates | | (substituted on) 88' |
Manager:
Óscar Tabárez

| GK | 1 | Joe Hart |
| RB | 2 | Glen Johnson |
| CB | 5 | Gary Cahill |
| CB | 6 | Phil Jagielka |
| LB | 3 | Leighton Baines |
| CM | 4 | Steven Gerrard (c) | (yellow card) 68' |
| CM | 14 | Jordan Henderson | | (substituted off) 87' |
| RW | 19 | Raheem Sterling | | (substituted off) 64' |
| AM | 10 | Wayne Rooney |
| LW | 11 | Danny Welbeck | | (substituted off) 71' |
| CF | 9 | Daniel Sturridge |
Substitutions:
| MF | 21 | Ross Barkley | | (substituted on) 64' |
| MF | 20 | Adam Lallana | | (substituted on) 71' |
| FW | 18 | Rickie Lambert | | (substituted on) 87' |
Manager:
Roy Hodgson

Man of the Match:
Luis Suárez (Uruguay)

Assistant referees:
Roberto Alonso (Spain)
Juan Carlos Yuste (Spain)
Fourth official:
Alireza Faghani (Iran)
Fifth official:
Hassan Kamranifar (Iran)

=== Italy vs Costa Rica ===
The two teams had met in one previous match, in a friendly in 1994.

Mario Balotelli had Italy's best chance in the first half, lobbing the ball wide from inside the penalty area. Late in the first half, Joel Campbell had a clear penalty appeal denied, but Costa Rica nevertheless took the lead within a minute, as Júnior Díaz crossed from the left for Bryan Ruiz to head the ball onto the crossbar and over the line from close range. Costa Rica was able to hold on for the win in the second half, ensuring their qualification for the knockout stage, their first since 1990, while simultaneously ensuring England's group stage exit, their first since 1958.

Costa Rica became the second country to beat two World Cup champions in the group stage of one tournament, the other being Denmark, who had done it twice in 1986 (Uruguay and West Germany) and 2002 (Uruguay and France). Italy goalkeeper Gianluigi Buffon appeared in his fourth World Cup (he was also in the squad for the 1998 FIFA World Cup, but did not appear in any match), the fifth Italian player to do so.

Coincidentally, Costa Rica's qualification to the Round of 16 occurred exactly twenty-four years after their victory against Sweden at the 1990 FIFA World Cup, which also sealed their first-ever qualification to the Round of 16. Because of this, La Nación's Rodrigo Calvo called 20 June "a blessed date" for the Costa Rican team.

20 June 2014
13:00 BRT (UTC−3)

| Italy | 0–1 | Costa Rica |
|---|---|---|
| | | Ruiz 44' |

Itaipava Arena Pernambuco, Recife
Attendance: 40,285
Referee: Enrique Osses (Chile)

| Italy | Costa Rica |

| GK | 1 | Gianluigi Buffon (c) |
| RB | 4 | Matteo Darmian |
| CB | 15 | Andrea Barzagli |
| CB | 3 | Giorgio Chiellini |
| LB | 7 | Ignazio Abate |
| DM | 16 | Daniele De Rossi |
| CM | 21 | Andrea Pirlo |
| CM | 5 | Thiago Motta | | (substituted off) 46' |
| RW | 6 | Antonio Candreva | | (substituted off) 57' |
| LW | 8 | Claudio Marchisio | | (substituted off) 69' |
| CF | 9 | Mario Balotelli | (yellow card) 69' |
Substitutions:
| FW | 10 | Antonio Cassano | | (substituted on) 46' |
| FW | 22 | Lorenzo Insigne | | (substituted on) 57' |
| FW | 11 | Alessio Cerci | | (substituted on) 69' |
Manager:
Cesare Prandelli

| GK | 1 | Keylor Navas |
| SW | 3 | Giancarlo González |
| RB | 16 | Cristian Gamboa |
| CB | 6 | Óscar Duarte |
| CB | 4 | Michael Umaña |
| LB | 15 | Júnior Díaz |
| CM | 5 | Celso Borges |
| CM | 17 | Yeltsin Tejeda | | (substituted off) 68' |
| RW | 10 | Bryan Ruiz (c) | | (substituted off) 81' |
| LW | 7 | Christian Bolaños |
| CF | 9 | Joel Campbell | | (substituted off) 74' |
Substitutions:
| MF | 22 | José Miguel Cubero | (yellow card) 71' | (substituted on) 68' |
| FW | 21 | Marco Ureña | | (substituted on) 74' |
| FW | 14 | Randall Brenes | | (substituted on) 81' |
Manager:
(Colombia) Jorge Luis Pinto

Man of the Match:
Bryan Ruiz (Costa Rica)

Assistant referees:
Carlos Astroza (Chile)
Sergio Román (Chile)
Fourth official:
Néant Alioum (Cameroon)
Fifth official:
Djibril Camara (Senegal)

=== Italy vs Uruguay ===
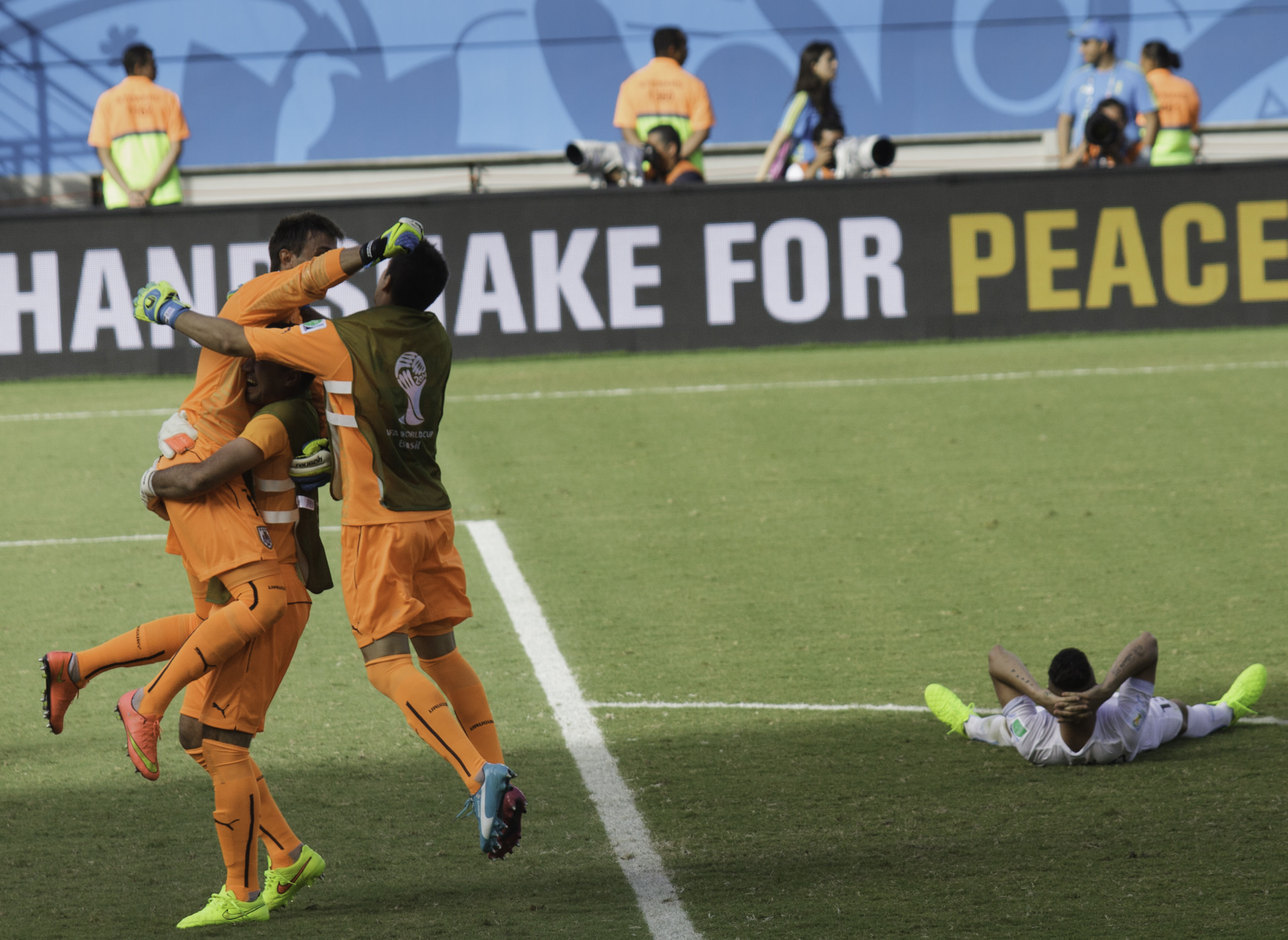
The Uruguayan goalkeepers (L–R) Fernando Muslera, Rodrigo Muñoz, and Martín Silva celebrating after the match

The two teams had met in eight previous matches, including twice in the FIFA World Cup (1970, group stage: Italy 0–0 Uruguay; 1990, round of 16: Italy 2–0 Uruguay). Their most recent meeting was in the 2013 FIFA Confederations Cup match for third place, won by Italy 3–2 on penalties (2–2 draw after extra time).

After a goalless first half, Italy were reduced to 10 men in the second half when Claudio Marchisio was sent off for a studs-up challenge on Egidio Arévalo.

Around the 79th minute, Uruguay forward Luis Suárez bit the left shoulder of Italian defender Giorgio Chiellini. Chiellini showed the bite marks to Mexican referee Marco Rodríguez, who missed the incident. As the Italian players protested to the referee for not penalising Suárez, Uruguay won a corner which Gastón Ramírez delivered from the right. Diego Godín rose to head the ball, with the only goal of the game going in off his back. In the 84th minute, a member of the Italian coaching staff was dismissed from the bench by the referee after an altercation with his Uruguayan counterparts. Uruguay's win qualified them for the knockout stage as the group runners-up, and eliminated Italy from the tournament; this marked the second consecutive time that Italy had been eliminated at the group stage. With Italy failing to qualify for the next three tournaments, this remains their latest World Cup match as of 2026.

After the biting incident, Suárez claimed that he "had contact with [Chiellini's] shoulder, nothing more" and that "these things happen".

On the same day of the match, FIFA opened disciplinary proceedings against Suárez regarding the biting incident. During the proceedings, FIFA confirmed that Suárez's previous two bans due to biting incidents (seven games for biting Otman Bakkal while playing for Ajax and 10 games for biting Branislav Ivanović while playing for Liverpool) would be taken into account. Two days after the match, the FIFA Disciplinary Committee banned Suárez for nine international matches, effective immediately, meaning he would take no further part in the World Cup. It was the longest such ban in World Cup history, exceeding the eight-match ban handed to Italy's Mauro Tassotti for breaking the nose of Spain's Luis Enrique at the 1994 FIFA World Cup. He was also banned from taking part in any football-related activity (including entering any stadium) for four months and fined CHF100,000 (approx. £65,700/€82,000/US$119,000). The verdict would not prevent Suárez from transferring to another club. Suárez later admitted that he had bitten Chiellini and formally apologised, while writing that the "physical result of a bite" occurred in a collision with Chiellini. On 3 July, the Uruguayan Football Association (AUF) appealed against the decision to FIFA, but it was rejected on 10 July. After an appeal to the Court of Arbitration for Sport, Suárez was later allowed to participate in training and friendly matches with new club Barcelona.

24 June 2014
13:00 BRT (UTC−3)

| Italy | 0–1 | Uruguay |
|---|---|---|
| | | Godín 81' |

Arena das Dunas, Natal
Attendance: 39,706
Referee: Marco Rodríguez (Mexico)

| Italy | Uruguay |

| GK | 1 | Gianluigi Buffon (c) |
| CB | 15 | Andrea Barzagli |
| CB | 19 | Leonardo Bonucci |
| CB | 3 | Giorgio Chiellini |
| RM | 4 | Matteo Darmian |
| CM | 23 | Marco Verratti | | (substituted off) 75' |
| CM | 8 | Claudio Marchisio | (red card) 59' |
| LM | 2 | Mattia De Sciglio | (yellow card) 77' |
| AM | 21 | Andrea Pirlo |
| SS | 17 | Ciro Immobile | | (substituted off) 71' |
| CF | 9 | Mario Balotelli | (yellow card) 22' | (substituted off) 46' |
Substitutions:
| MF | 18 | Marco Parolo | | (substituted on) 46' |
| FW | 10 | Antonio Cassano | | (substituted on) 71' |
| MF | 5 | Thiago Motta | | (substituted on) 75' |
Manager:
Cesare Prandelli

| GK | 1 | Fernando Muslera | (yellow card) 90+1' |
| RB | 22 | Martín Cáceres |
| CB | 13 | José Giménez |
| CB | 3 | Diego Godín (c) |
| LB | 6 | Álvaro Pereira | | (substituted off) 63' |
| RM | 20 | Álvaro González |
| CM | 17 | Egidio Arévalo | (yellow card) 46' |
| LM | 7 | Cristian Rodríguez | | (substituted off) 78' |
| AM | 14 | Nicolás Lodeiro | | (substituted off) 46' |
| CF | 9 | Luis Suárez |
| CF | 21 | Edinson Cavani |
Substitutions:
| DF | 16 | Maxi Pereira | | (substituted on) 46' |
| FW | 11 | Christian Stuani | | (substituted on) 63' |
| MF | 18 | Gastón Ramírez | | (substituted on) 78' |
Manager:
Óscar Tabárez

Man of the Match:
Gianluigi Buffon (Italy)

Assistant referees:
Marvin Torrentera (Mexico)
Marcos Quintero (Mexico)
Fourth official:
Mark Geiger (United States)
Fifth official:
Mark Hurd (United States)

=== Costa Rica vs England ===
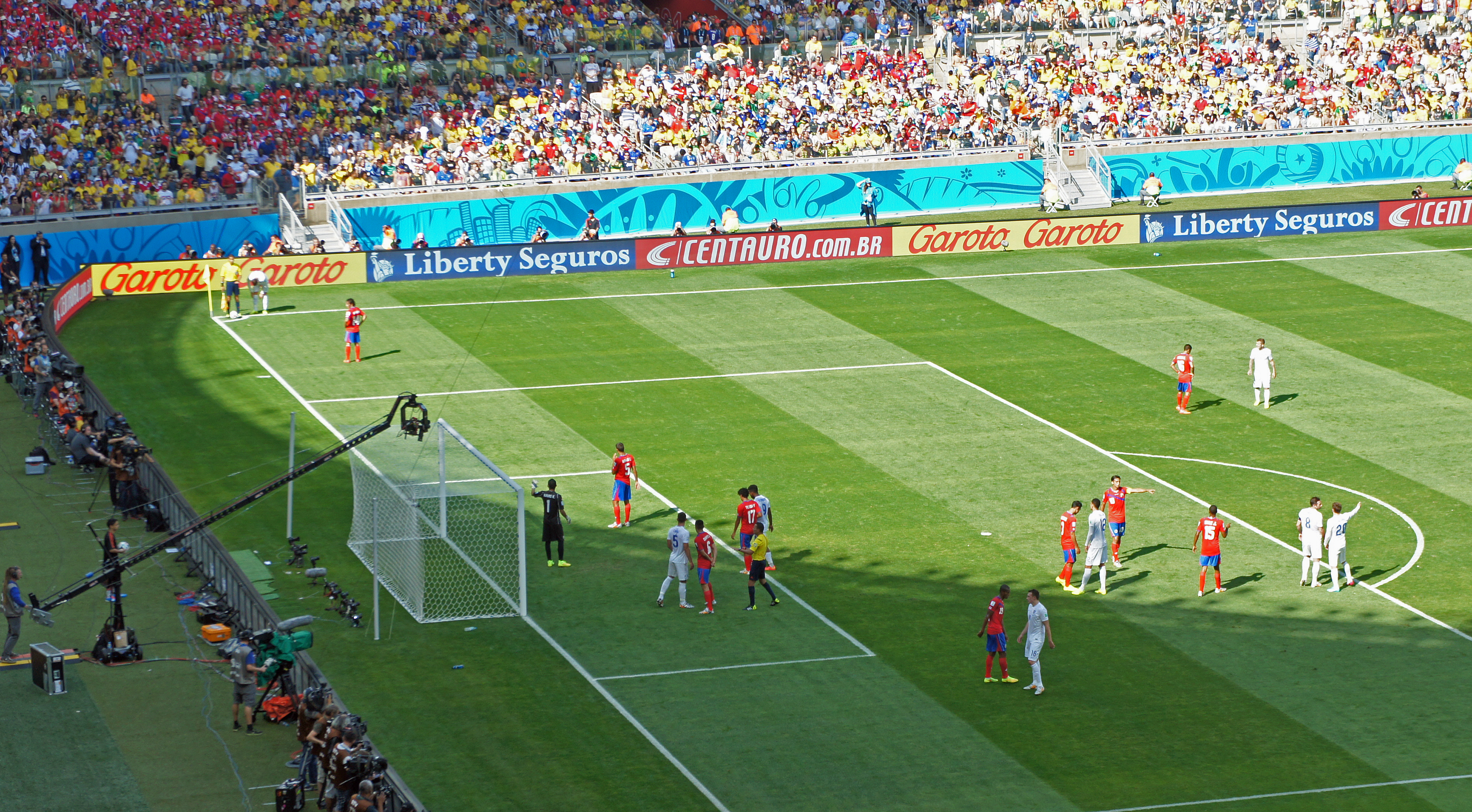
Take of a corner kick for England during the match

The two teams had never met before.

As England could no longer advance to the knockout stage, their manager Roy Hodgson made nine changes to the starting line-up with Frank Lampard captaining the side. The match finished goalless, and the draw was enough to confirm Costa Rica, which had already sealed their place in the knockout stage, as the group winners with seven points after three matches.

This was England's 11th goalless draw in World Cup Finals history, more than any other team.

24 June 2014
13:00 BRT (UTC−3)

| Costa Rica | 0–0 | England |

Estádio Mineirão, Belo Horizonte
Attendance: 57,823
Referee: Djamel Haimoudi (Algeria)

| Costa Rica | England |

| GK | 1 | Keylor Navas |
| SW | 3 | Giancarlo González | (yellow card) 60' |
| CB | 6 | Óscar Duarte |
| CB | 19 | Roy Miller |
| RWB | 16 | Cristian Gamboa |
| LWB | 15 | Júnior Díaz |
| DM | 5 | Celso Borges | | (substituted off) 78' |
| CM | 10 | Bryan Ruiz (c) |
| CM | 17 | Yeltsin Tejeda |
| SS | 14 | Randall Brenes | | (substituted off) 59' |
| CF | 9 | Joel Campbell | | (substituted off) 65' |
Substitutions:
| MF | 7 | Christian Bolaños | | (substituted on) 59' |
| FW | 21 | Marco Ureña | | (substituted on) 65' |
| MF | 11 | Michael Barrantes | | (substituted on) 78' |
Manager:
(Colombia) Jorge Luis Pinto

| GK | 13 | Ben Foster |
| RB | 16 | Phil Jones |
| CB | 5 | Gary Cahill |
| CB | 12 | Chris Smalling |
| LB | 23 | Luke Shaw |
| CM | 8 | Frank Lampard (c) |
| CM | 7 | Jack Wilshere | | (substituted off) 73' |
| RW | 17 | James Milner | | (substituted off) 76' |
| AM | 21 | Ross Barkley | (yellow card) 53' |
| LW | 20 | Adam Lallana | (yellow card) 57' | (substituted off) 62' |
| CF | 9 | Daniel Sturridge |
Substitutions:
| MF | 19 | Raheem Sterling | | (substituted on) 62' |
| MF | 4 | Steven Gerrard | | (substituted on) 73' |
| FW | 10 | Wayne Rooney | | (substituted on) 76' |
Manager:
Roy Hodgson

Man of the Match:
Keylor Navas (Costa Rica)

Assistant referees:
Rédouane Achik (Morocco)
Abdelhak Etchiali (Algeria)
Fourth official:
Alireza Faghani (Iran)
Fifth official:
Hassan Kamranifar (Iran)

== See also ==
- Costa Rica at the FIFA World Cup
- England at the FIFA World Cup
- Italy at the FIFA World Cup
- Uruguay at the FIFA World Cup
