= 2014 FIFA World Cup Group C =

Football tournament group stage

Group C of the 2014 FIFA World Cup consisted of Colombia, Greece, Ivory Coast, and Japan. Play began on 14 June and ended on 24 June 2014. The top two teams, Colombia and Greece, advanced to the round of 16.

== Teams ==
Draw position	Team	Confederation	Method of qualification	Date of qualification	Finals appearance	Last appearance	Previous best performance	FIFA Rankings	
Draw position	Team	Confederation	Method of qualification	Date of qualification	Finals appearance	Last appearance	Previous best performance	October 2013 (Note: The rankings of October 2013 were used for seeding for the final draw.)	June 2014
C1 (seed)	Colombia	CONMEBOL	CONMEBOL runners-up	11 October 2013	5th	1998	Round of 16 (1990)	4	8
C2	Greece	UEFA	UEFA Play-off winners	19 November 2013	3rd	2010	Group stage (1994, 2010)	15	12
C3	Ivory Coast	CAF	CAF third round winners	16 November 2013	3rd	2010	Group stage (2006, 2010)	17	23
C4	Japan	AFC	AFC fourth round Group B winners	4 June 2013	5th	2010	Round of 16 (2002, 2010)	44	46

== Standings ==
Pos	Team	Pld	W	D	L	GF	GA	GD	Pts	Qualification
1	Colombia	3	3	0	0	9	2	+7	9	Advance to knockout stage
2	Greece	3	1	1	1	2	4	−2	4	Advance to knockout stage
3	Ivory Coast	3	1	0	2	4	5	−1	3	
4	Japan	3	0	1	2	2	6	−4	1	

Source: FIFA
Rules for classification: Tie-breaking criteria
- Colombia advanced to play Uruguay (runner-up of Group D) in the round of 16.
- Greece advanced to play Costa Rica (winner of Group D) in the round of 16.

== Matches ==
=== Colombia vs Greece ===
The two teams had met in one previous match, in a friendly in 1994, where Colombia won 2–0. Colombia midfielder Fredy Guarín was suspended for the match, after being sent off in the team's final qualifier against Paraguay.

Colombia took the lead within five minutes, Juan Cuadrado's cutback was converted by Pablo Armero via a deflection off Greek defender Kostas Manolas. Colombia extended the lead in the second half, when Abel Aguilar flicked on a corner kick from James Rodríguez and Teófilo Gutiérrez scored from close range. Greece's best chance fell to Theofanis Gekas, who headed against the bar. In stoppage time, Cuadrado set up James to complete the scoring with a low shot.

The 3–0 scoreline was Colombia's biggest win to date in the World Cup.

14 June 2014
13:00 BRT (UTC−3)

Colombia	3–0	Greece
Armero 5'; Gutiérrez 58'; Rodríguez 90+3'

Estádio Mineirão, Belo Horizonte
Attendance: 57,174
Referee: Mark Geiger (United States)

Colombia	Greece

GK	1	David Ospina
RB	18	Juan Camilo Zúñiga
CB	2	Cristián Zapata
CB	3	Mario Yepes (c)
LB	7	Pablo Armero		(substituted off) 74'
CM	6	Carlos Sánchez	(yellow card) 26'
CM	8	Abel Aguilar		(substituted off) 69'
RW	11	Juan Cuadrado
AM	10	James Rodríguez
LW	14	Víctor Ibarbo
CF	9	Teófilo Gutiérrez		(substituted off) 76'
Substitutions:
MF	15	Alexander Mejía		(substituted on) 69'
DF	4	Santiago Arias		(substituted on) 74'
FW	21	Jackson Martínez		(substituted on) 76'
Manager:
(Argentina) José Pékerman

GK	1	Orestis Karnezis
RB	15	Vasilis Torosidis
CB	4	Kostas Manolas
CB	19	Sokratis Papastathopoulos	(yellow card) 52'
LB	20	José Holebas
RM	14	Dimitris Salpingidis	(yellow card) 55'	(substituted off) 57'
CM	2	Giannis Maniatis
CM	21	Kostas Katsouranis (c)
LM	8	Panagiotis Kone		(substituted off) 78'
CF	7	Georgios Samaras
CF	17	Theofanis Gekas		(substituted off) 64'
Substitutions:
MF	18	Giannis Fetfatzidis		(substituted on) 57'
FW	9	Konstantinos Mitroglou		(substituted on) 64'
MF	10	Giorgos Karagounis		(substituted on) 78'
Manager:
(Portugal) Fernando Santos

Man of the Match:
James Rodríguez (Colombia)

Assistant referees:
Mark Hurd (United States)
Joe Fletcher (Canada)
Fourth official:
Alireza Faghani (Iran)
Fifth official:
Hassan Kamranifar (Iran)

=== Ivory Coast vs Japan ===
The two teams had met in three previous matches, all in friendlies, most recently in 2010.

Japan took the lead in the first half, when Keisuke Honda collected a pass from Yuto Nagatomo after a quick throw-in to strike home with his left foot high into the net.

However, Ivory Coast came back with two goals in two minutes in the second half, first Wilfried Bony headed in from Serge Aurier's cross from the right from six yards, followed by a Gervinho header from six yards from another cross from Aurier on the right.

With his goal, Honda became the first Japanese player to score in two World Cups, and also claimed sole possession of being the top Japanese scorer in World Cup history with three total goals.

14 June 2014
22:00 BRT (UTC−3)

Ivory Coast	2–1	Japan
Bony 64'; Gervinho 66'		Honda 16'

Itaipava Arena Pernambuco, Recife
Attendance: 40,267
Referee: Enrique Osses (Chile)

Ivory Coast	Japan

GK	1	Boubacar Barry
RB	17	Serge Aurier
CB	5	Didier Zokora	(yellow card) 58'
CB	22	Sol Bamba	(yellow card) 54'
LB	3	Arthur Boka		(substituted off) 75'
CM	9	Cheick Tioté
CM	20	Serey Die		(substituted off) 62'
AM	19	Yaya Touré (c)
RF	8	Salomon Kalou
CF	12	Wilfried Bony		(substituted off) 78'
LF	10	Gervinho
Substitutions:
FW	11	Didier Drogba		(substituted on) 62'
DF	18	Constant Djakpa		(substituted on) 75'
FW	13	Didier Ya Konan		(substituted on) 78'
Manager:
(France) Sabri Lamouchi

GK	1	Eiji Kawashima
RB	2	Atsuto Uchida
CB	22	Maya Yoshida	(yellow card) 23'
CB	6	Masato Morishige	(yellow card) 64'
LB	5	Yuto Nagatomo
DM	16	Hotaru Yamaguchi
DM	17	Makoto Hasebe (c)		(substituted off) 54'
RW	9	Shinji Okazaki
AM	4	Keisuke Honda
LW	10	Shinji Kagawa		(substituted off) 86'
CF	18	Yuya Osako		(substituted off) 67'
Substitutions:
MF	7	Yasuhito Endō		(substituted on) 54'
FW	13	Yoshito Ōkubo		(substituted on) 67'
MF	11	Yoichiro Kakitani		(substituted on) 86'
Manager:
(Italy) Alberto Zaccheroni

Man of the Match:
Yaya Touré (Ivory Coast)

Assistant referees:
Carlos Astroza (Chile)
Sergio Román (Chile)
Fourth official:
Néant Alioum (Cameroon)
Fifth official:
Djibril Camara (Senegal)

=== Colombia vs Ivory Coast ===
The two teams had never met before.

After a goalless first half, Colombia scored first when James Rodríguez headed in Juan Cuadrado's corner. The lead was extended six minutes later when Ivory Coast was caught in possession, and Teófilo Gutiérrez released substitute Juan Quintero to score. Ivory Coast reduced the deficit through Gervinho, who received a pass from Arthur Boka in the left wing, dribbled past three Colombian players and shot home.

The second goal of the tournament by James allowed him to join Bernardo Redín and Adolfo Valencia as the only Colombian players to score more than one goal in the World Cup.

19 June 2014
13:00 BRT (UTC−3)

Colombia	2–1	Ivory Coast
Rodríguez 64'; Quintero 70'		Gervinho 73'

Estádio Nacional Mané Garrincha, Brasília
Attendance: 68,748
Referee: Howard Webb (England)

Colombia	Ivory Coast

GK	1	David Ospina
RB	18	Juan Camilo Zúñiga
CB	2	Cristián Zapata
CB	3	Mario Yepes (c)
LB	7	Pablo Armero	(substituted off) 72'
CM	8	Abel Aguilar	(substituted off) 79'
CM	6	Carlos Sánchez
RW	11	Juan Cuadrado
AM	10	James Rodríguez
LW	14	Víctor Ibarbo	(substituted off) 53'
CF	9	Teófilo Gutiérrez
Substitutions:
MF	20	Juan Quintero	(substituted on) 53'
DF	4	Santiago Arias	(substituted on) 72'
MF	15	Alexander Mejía	(substituted on) 79'
Manager:
(Argentina) José Pékerman

GK	1	Boubacar Barry
RB	17	Serge Aurier
CB	5	Didier Zokora	(yellow card) 55'
CB	22	Sol Bamba
LB	3	Arthur Boka
CM	20	Serey Die		(substituted off) 73'
CM	9	Cheick Tioté	(yellow card) 90'
RW	10	Gervinho
AM	19	Yaya Touré (c)
LW	15	Max Gradel		(substituted off) 67'
CF	12	Wilfried Bony		(substituted off) 60'
Substitutions:
FW	11	Didier Drogba		(substituted on) 60'
FW	8	Salomon Kalou		(substituted on) 67'
MF	6	Mathis Bolly		(substituted on) 73'
Manager:
(France) Sabri Lamouchi

Man of the Match:
James Rodríguez (Colombia)

Assistant referees:
Michael Mullarkey (England)
Darren Cann (England)
Fourth official:
Víctor Hugo Carrillo (Peru)
Fifth official:
Rodney Aquino (Paraguay)

=== Japan vs Greece ===
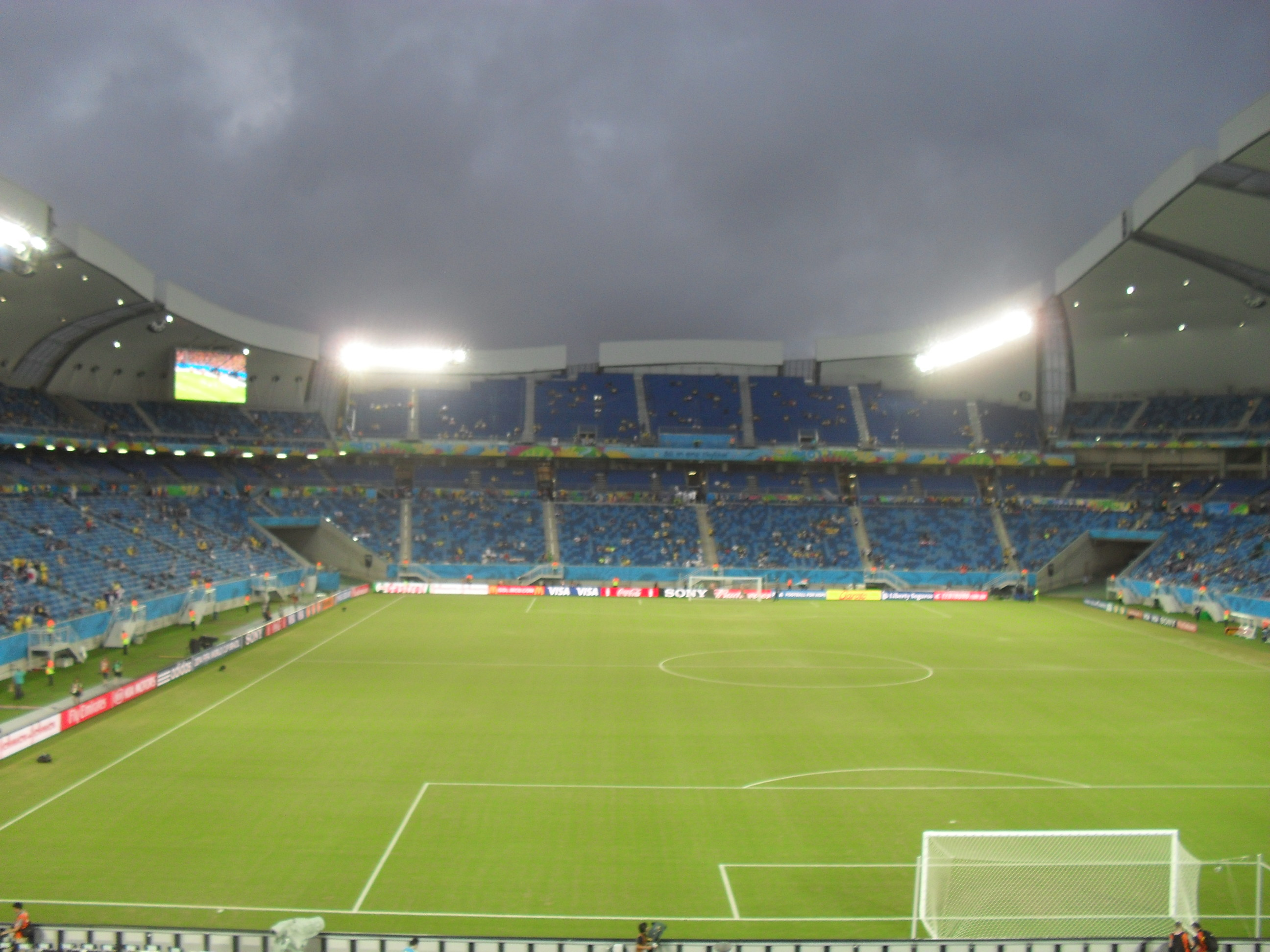
Arena das Dunas before the Japan x Greece match.

The two teams had met in one previous match, in the 2005 FIFA Confederations Cup group stage, won by Japan 1–0.

Greece was reduced to ten men in the first half when Kostas Katsouranis was booked twice in eleven minutes. In the second half, Greece had a Theofanis Gekas header saved, while Japan, which needed at least a point to stay alive in the competition, had chances to score through Yoshito Ōkubo and Atsuto Uchida, but the game finished goalless. The result ensured Colombia's qualification to the knockout stage, their first since 1990.

This was the first clean sheet kept by Greece in World Cup history.

19 June 2014
19:00 BRT (UTC−3)

Japan	0–0	Greece

Arena das Dunas, Natal
Attendance: 39,485
Referee: Joel Aguilar (El Salvador)

Japan	Greece

GK	1	Eiji Kawashima
RB	2	Atsuto Uchida
CB	22	Maya Yoshida
CB	15	Yasuyuki Konno
LB	5	Yuto Nagatomo
CM	16	Hotaru Yamaguchi
CM	17	Makoto Hasebe (c)	(yellow card) 12'	(substituted off) 46'
RW	9	Shinji Okazaki
AM	4	Keisuke Honda
LW	13	Yoshito Ōkubo
CF	18	Yuya Osako		(substituted off) 57'
Substitutions:
MF	7	Yasuhito Endō		(substituted on) 46'
MF	10	Shinji Kagawa		(substituted on) 57'
Manager:
(Italy) Alberto Zaccheroni

GK	1	Orestis Karnezis
RB	15	Vasilis Torosidis	(yellow card) 89'
CB	4	Kostas Manolas
CB	19	Sokratis Papastathopoulos
LB	20	José Holebas
DM	21	Kostas Katsouranis (c)	(yellow card) 27' (yellow-red card) 38'
CM	2	Giannis Maniatis
CM	8	Panagiotis Kone		(substituted off) 81'
RW	18	Giannis Fetfatzidis		(substituted off) 41'
LW	7	Georgios Samaras	(yellow card) 55'
CF	9	Kostas Mitroglou		(substituted off) 35'
Substitutions:
FW	17	Theofanis Gekas		(substituted on) 35'
MF	10	Giorgos Karagounis		(substituted on) 41'
FW	14	Dimitris Salpingidis		(substituted on) 81'
Manager:
(Portugal) Fernando Santos

Man of the Match:
Keisuke Honda (Japan)

Assistant referees:
William Torres (El Salvador)
Juan Zumba (El Salvador)
Fourth official:
Norbert Hauata (Tahiti)
Fifth official:
Aden Marwa (Kenya)

=== Japan vs Colombia ===
The two teams had met in two previous matches, most recently in a friendly in 2007, and also in the 2003 FIFA Confederations Cup group stage, won by Colombia 1–0.

Colombia took the lead mid-way through the first half, with Juan Cuadrado taking a penalty kick, shooting low down the middle after Japan centre back Yasuyuki Konno fouled Colombia striker Adrián Ramos in the box. Japan then equalised through Shinji Okazaki's headed goal from a cross from Keisuke Honda on the right in first half stoppage time. Colombia's James Rodríguez was introduced after the half time break, and was credited for providing two assists for two goals scored by Jackson Martínez, on 55 minutes when he shot low to the net with his left foot, and 82 minutes when he curled the ball in from the right of the penalty area with his left foot, before finishing off the scoring with a strike of his own, assisted by Ramos, where he beat the last man before clipping the ball over the goalkeeper. Colombia, which had already qualified for the knockout stage and would do so as group winners if either they didn't lose this match or Ivory Coast did not beat Greece in the other match, finished as group winners with a perfect record of three wins out of three, while Japan, which had to win the match to have any chance to qualify, were eliminated.

Faryd Mondragón became the oldest player to make an appearance in the history of the World Cup, at the age of 43 years, 3 days, when he came on for the last five minutes of the match, breaking the record of Roger Milla, who played at the 1994 World Cup at the age of 42. He also set the record for the longest time between World Cup appearances as 15 years and 363 days had passed since his last versus England at the 1998 World Cup, breaking Alfred Bickel's record of 12 years and 13 days between appearances (1938–1950).

24 June 2014
16:00 AMT (UTC−4)

Japan	1–4	Colombia
Okazaki 45+1'		Cuadrado 17' (pen.); Martínez 55', 82'; Rodríguez 90'

Arena Pantanal, Cuiabá
Attendance: 40,340
Referee: Pedro Proença (Portugal)

Japan	Colombia

GK	1	Eiji Kawashima
RB	2	Atsuto Uchida
CB	22	Maya Yoshida
CB	15	Yasuyuki Konno	(yellow card) 16'
LB	5	Yuto Nagatomo
CM	14	Toshihiro Aoyama		(substituted off) 62'
CM	17	Makoto Hasebe (c)
RW	9	Shinji Okazaki		(substituted off) 69'
AM	4	Keisuke Honda
LW	10	Shinji Kagawa		(substituted off) 85'
CF	13	Yoshito Ōkubo
Substitutions:
MF	16	Hotaru Yamaguchi		(substituted on) 62'
FW	11	Yoichiro Kakitani		(substituted on) 69'
MF	8	Hiroshi Kiyotake		(substituted on) 85'
Manager:
(Italy) Alberto Zaccheroni

GK	1	David Ospina (c)		(substituted off) 85'
RB	4	Santiago Arias
CB	23	Carlos Valdés
CB	16	Éder Balanta
LB	7	Pablo Armero
RM	11	Juan Cuadrado		(substituted off) 46'
CM	15	Alexander Mejía
CM	13	Fredy Guarín	(yellow card) 63'
LM	20	Juan Quintero		(substituted off) 46'
SS	19	Adrián Ramos
CF	21	Jackson Martínez
Substitutions:
MF	5	Carlos Carbonero		(substituted on) 46'
MF	10	James Rodríguez		(substituted on) 46'
GK	22	Faryd Mondragón		(substituted on) 85'
Manager:
(Argentina) José Pékerman

Man of the Match:
Jackson Martínez (Colombia)

Assistant referees:
Bertino Cunha (Portugal)
Tiago Trigo (Portugal)
Fourth official:
Roberto Moreno (Panama)
Fifth official:
Eric Boria (United States)

=== Greece vs Ivory Coast ===
The two teams had never met before. Greece midfielder Kostas Katsouranis (red card in previous match) and Ivory Coast defender Didier Zokora (accumulation of yellow cards) were suspended for the match.

Greece, which had to win to have any chance to qualify for the knockout stage, went in front in the 42nd minute after Cheick Tioté's defensive mistake allowed substitute Andreas Samaris to steal the ball, play a one-two with Georgios Samaras, and run in on goal before shooting past the goalkeeper with his right foot. In the second half, substitute Wilfried Bony equalised with a low right foot finish after Gervinho's pass from the left. As Japan were losing to Colombia in the other match played at the same time, Ivory Coast only required a point to qualify for the knockout stage for the first time. The game looked to be heading for a draw, until Greece won a penalty in injury time when Giovanni Sio tripped Samaras as he was about to strike the ball, and Samaras scored the penalty hitting the ball to the goalkeeper's left. The win meant Greece finished as the group runners-up, and put them into the knockout stage for the first time in its World Cup history (after unsuccessful campaigns in 1994 and 2010), while Ivory Coast were eliminated in the group stage for the third tournament in a row.

24 June 2014
17:00 BRT (UTC−3)

Greece	2–1	Ivory Coast
Samaris 42'; Samaras 90+3' (pen.)		Bony 74'

Estádio Castelão, Fortaleza
Attendance: 59,095
Referee: Carlos Vera (Ecuador)

Greece	Ivory Coast

GK	1	Orestis Karnezis	(substituted off) 24'
RB	15	Vasilis Torosidis
CB	4	Kostas Manolas
CB	19	Sokratis Papastathopoulos
LB	20	José Holebas
DM	10	Giorgos Karagounis (c)	(substituted off) 78'
CM	2	Giannis Maniatis
CM	16	Lazaros Christodoulopoulos
RW	8	Panagiotis Kone	(substituted off) 12'
LW	7	Georgios Samaras
CF	14	Dimitris Salpingidis
Substitutions:
MF	22	Andreas Samaris	(substituted on) 12'
GK	12	Panagiotis Glykos	(substituted on) 24'
FW	17	Theofanis Gekas	(substituted on) 78'
Manager:
(Portugal) Fernando Santos

GK	1	Boubacar Barry
RB	17	Serge Aurier
CB	4	Kolo Touré
CB	22	Sol Bamba
LB	3	Arthur Boka
CM	9	Cheick Tioté		(substituted off) 61'
CM	20	Serey Die	(yellow card) 70'
RW	8	Salomon Kalou	(yellow card) 62'
AM	19	Yaya Touré
LW	10	Gervinho		(substituted off) 83'
CF	11	Didier Drogba (c)	(yellow card) 37'	(substituted off) 78'
Substitutions:
FW	12	Wilfried Bony		(substituted on) 61'
MF	14	Ismaël Diomandé		(substituted on) 78'
FW	21	Giovanni Sio		(substituted on) 83'
Manager:
(France) Sabri Lamouchi

Man of the Match:
Georgios Samaras (Greece)

Assistant referees:
Christian Lescano (Ecuador)
Byron Romero (Ecuador)
Fourth official:
Sandro Ricci (Brazil)
Fifth official:
Emerson de Carvalho (Brazil)

== See also ==
- Colombia at the FIFA World Cup
- Greece at the FIFA World Cup
- Ivory Coast at the FIFA World Cup
- Japan at the FIFA World Cup
