= 2014 FIFA World Cup seeding =

Calculation of football teams before tournament

The final draw for the 2014 FIFA World Cup took place on 6 December 2013 at the Costa do Sauípe Resort, Mata de São João in Bahia, at 13:00 local time (UTC−3). Hosted by television presenters Fernanda Lima and Rodrigo Hilbert, and conducted by FIFA General Secretary Jérôme Valcke, the ceremony featured former footballers representing each FIFA World Cup-winning nation: Cafu (Brazil), Fabio Cannavaro (Italy), Lothar Matthäus (Germany), Zinedine Zidane (France), Mario Kempes (Argentina), Fernando Hierro (Spain), Geoff Hurst (England), and Alcides Ghiggia (Uruguay), who assisted with the draw. The ceremony determined the group in which the 32 participating teams would begin the final tournament. The teams were divided in advance by FIFA into four pots based on seedings and geographic regions.

== Seeding ==
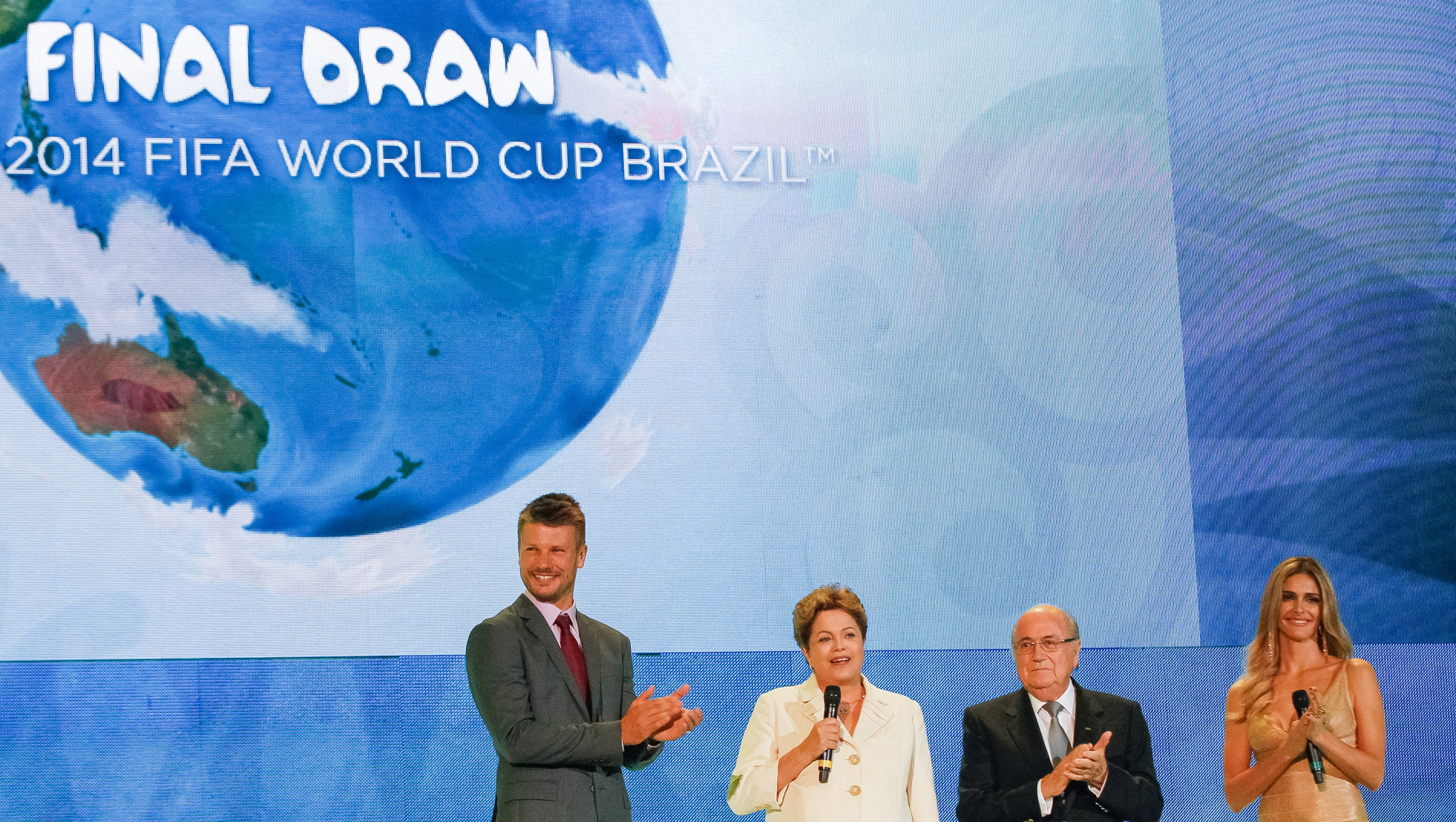
Rodrigo Hilbert, Dilma Rousseff, Sepp Blatter and Fernanda Lima at the World Cup finals draw in Brazil

Seeding for the draw was based on the October 2013 version of the FIFA World Ranking. Although the November 2013 rankings were the most current at the time of the final draw, the usage of those rankings would advantage those teams who had played additional play-off matches in order to qualify. Brazil were not among the top eight seeded teams at the time but, in keeping with usual FIFA World Cup procedure, were seeded by virtue of being the host nation. The top seven teams in the October 2013 FIFA World Ranking filled the remaining seeded positions.

Team	FIFA Ranking October 2013
Brazil (hosts)	11
Spain	1
Germany	2
Argentina	3
Colombia	4
Belgium	5
Uruguay	6
Switzerland	7
Netherlands	8
Italy	9
England	10
Chile	12
United States	13
Portugal	14
Greece	15
Bosnia and Herzegovina	16
Ivory Coast	17
Croatia	18
Russia	19
France	21
Ecuador	22
Ghana	23
Mexico	24
Costa Rica	31
Algeria	32
Nigeria	33
Honduras	34
Japan	44
Iran	49
South Korea	56
Australia	57
Cameroon	59

== The draw ==
In preparation for the final draw, the 32 participating teams were put into four pots based on seedings and geographic regions. It was announced in October 2013 that the eight seeded teams to feature in Pot 1 would consist of the host nation Brazil and the seven highest-ranked teams as of that month's FIFA World Rankings (see above). Following a meeting of the competition's organizing committee on 3 December, the composition of the other three pots was announced:

Pot 1 (Seeds)	Pot 2 (CAF & CONMEBOL)	Pot 3 (AFC & CONCACAF)	Pot 4 (UEFA)
Brazil (hosts); Argentina; Colombia; Uruguay; Belgium; Germany; Spain; Switzerland	Algeria; Cameroon; Ghana; Ivory Coast; Nigeria; Chile; Ecuador	Australia; Iran; Japan; South Korea; Costa Rica; Honduras; Mexico; United States	Bosnia and Herzegovina; Croatia; England; France; Greece; Italy (drawn into Pot 2); Netherlands; Portugal; Russia

The draw procedure was as follows:

1. One European team was first randomly drawn from Pot 4 and placed into Pot 2, in order to create four even pots of eight teams (in the draw Italy was drawn out).
2. The draw then proceeded with the drawing of the other seven seeded teams from Pot 1 into Groups B–H, with Brazil having been predetermined to be in Group A.
3. To maximise geographic separation, an ancillary pot ("Pot X") was created during the draw into which the four seeded South American teams (from Pot 1) were placed. One of these four teams was then drawn out (in the draw Uruguay was drawn out).
4. The sole European team from Pot 2 was then automatically placed into the group of the South American team that was drawn from "Pot X" (Italy was therefore placed into Uruguay's group); This process prevented three European teams being grouped together.
5. All remaining teams were then drawn sequentially from the pots (i.e. Pots 2, 3, then 4) into the groups in alphabetical order (i.e. Group A, then Group B, etc.). During the drawing of Pot 2, groups could be skipped over as the two South American teams in Pot 2 were not permitted to be drawn into the (remaining three) groups headed by South American seeds.
6. The positions within the eight groups were then drawn for the non-seeded teams, in order to determine the order of the fixtures within each group. The eight seeded teams were automatically designated the position of Team 1 within their group (e.g. Belgium would be H1).

== France seeding controversy ==
There was some controversy before the draw, which some called potgate, when FIFA decided that the European team in Pot 2 would be drawn there randomly. Previously, the lowest-ranked European team was sent there. In this case, that would have been France, who would otherwise have got the draw that occurred for Italy.

Many officials, fans and journalists complained, pointing out that a Frenchman, the FIFA secretary-general Jérôme Valcke, suggested the change, and suspecting that another influential Frenchman, UEFA's president, Michel Platini, helped approve it.

== Final draw ==
	1	2	3	4
Group A	Brazil	Croatia	Mexico	Cameroon
Group B	Spain	Netherlands	Chile	Australia
Group C	Colombia	Greece	Ivory Coast	Japan
Group D	Uruguay	Costa Rica	England	Italy
Group E	Switzerland	Ecuador	France	Honduras
Group F	Argentina	Bosnia and Herzegovina	Iran	Nigeria
Group G	Germany	Portugal	Ghana	United States
Group H	Belgium	Algeria	Russia	South Korea
