= Jam-e-jam =

Jam e Jam
- Type: Newspaper
- Founder(s): Rahbar Shirazi, Alireza Roostayian
- Founded: 1915
- Language: Persian
- City: Shiraz
- Country: Iran

Jamejam (Persian: جام جم) is an Iranian newspaper in Fars province. The Concessionaire of this newspaper was Rahbar Shirazi Alireza Roostayian and it was published in Shiraz since 1915.

== See also ==
- List of magazines and newspapers of Fars
