= 1962 FIFA World Cup squads =

Below are the squads for the 1962 FIFA World Cup final tournament in Chile. Switzerland (3), England (1), Spain (1) and West Germany (1) had players representing foreign clubs.

Two selected players comes from a foreign club of a non-qualified country (France).

== Group 1 ==
=== Soviet Union ===
Head coach: Gavril Kachalin

No.	Pos.	Player	Date of birth (age)	Caps	Club
1	GK	Lev Yashin	22 October 1929 (aged 32)	42	(Soviet Union) Dynamo Moscow
2	GK	Vladimir Maslachenko	5 March 1936 (aged 26)	8	(Soviet Union) Lokomotiv Moscow
3	GK	Sergey Kotrikadze	9 August 1936 (aged 25)	0	(Soviet Union) Dinamo Tbilisi
4	DF	Eduard Dubinski	6 April 1935 (aged 27)	9	(Soviet Union) CSKA Moscow
5	DF	Givi Chokheli	27 June 1937 (aged 24)	16	(Soviet Union) Dinamo Tbilisi
6	DF	Leonid Ostrovskiy	17 January 1936 (aged 26)	3	(Soviet Union) Torpedo Moscow
7	DF	Anatoli Maslyonkin	26 June 1930 (aged 31)	29	(Soviet Union) Spartak Moscow
8	MF	Albert Shesternyov	20 June 1941 (aged 20)	1	(Soviet Union) CSKA Moscow
9	MF	Nikolai Manoshin	6 March 1938 (aged 24)	8	(Soviet Union) Torpedo Moscow
10	MF	Igor Netto (captain)	9 January 1930 (aged 32)	48	(Soviet Union) Spartak Moscow
11	MF	Yozhef Sabo	1 March 1940 (aged 22)	0	(Soviet Union) Dynamo Kyiv
12	DF	Valery Voronin	17 July 1939 (aged 22)	14	(Soviet Union) Torpedo Moscow
13	FW	Gennadi Gusarov	11 March 1937 (aged 25)	5	(Soviet Union) Torpedo Moscow
14	FW	Valentin Ivanov	19 November 1934 (aged 27)	39	(Soviet Union) Torpedo Moscow
15	FW	Viktor Kanevski	3 October 1936 (aged 25)	3	(Soviet Union) Dynamo Kyiv
16	FW	Aleksei Mamykin	29 February 1936 (aged 26)	7	(Soviet Union) CSKA Moscow
17	FW	Mikhail Meskhi	12 January 1937 (aged 25)	18	(Soviet Union) Dinamo Tbilisi
18	MF	Slava Metreveli	30 May 1936 (aged 26)	19	(Soviet Union) Torpedo Moscow
19	FW	Viktor Ponedelnik	22 May 1937 (aged 25)	15	(Soviet Union) SKA Rostov
20	FW	Viktor Serebryanikov	29 March 1940 (aged 22)	0	(Soviet Union) Dynamo Kyiv
21	MF	Galimzyan Khusainov	27 June 1937 (aged 24)	3	(Soviet Union) Spartak Moscow
22	MF	Igor Chislenko	8 September 1939 (aged 22)	5	(Soviet Union) Dynamo Moscow

=== Yugoslavia ===
Head coaches: Ljubomir Lovrić and Prvoslav Mihajlović

No.	Pos.	Player	Date of birth (age)	Caps	Club
1	GK	Milutin Šoškić	31 December 1937 (aged 24)	29	(Socialist Federal Republic of Yugoslavia) Partizan
2	DF	Vladimir Durković	6 November 1937 (aged 24)	33	(Socialist Federal Republic of Yugoslavia) Red Star Belgrade
3	DF	Fahrudin Jusufi	8 December 1939 (aged 22)	29	(Socialist Federal Republic of Yugoslavia) Partizan
4	MF	Petar Radaković	22 February 1937 (aged 25)	9	(Socialist Federal Republic of Yugoslavia) Rijeka
5	DF	Vlatko Marković	1 January 1937 (aged 25)	7	(Socialist Federal Republic of Yugoslavia) Dinamo Zagreb
6	DF	Vladica Popović	17 March 1935 (aged 27)	3	(Socialist Federal Republic of Yugoslavia) Red Star Belgrade
7	FW	Andrija Anković	16 July 1937 (aged 24)	7	(Socialist Federal Republic of Yugoslavia) Hajduk Split
8	MF	Dragoslav Šekularac	8 November 1937 (aged 24)	29	(Socialist Federal Republic of Yugoslavia) Red Star Belgrade
9	FW	Dražan Jerković	6 August 1936 (aged 25)	9	(Socialist Federal Republic of Yugoslavia) Dinamo Zagreb
10	MF	Milan Galić (captain)	8 March 1938 (aged 24)	28	(Socialist Federal Republic of Yugoslavia) Partizan
11	FW	Josip Skoblar	12 March 1941 (aged 21)	2	(Socialist Federal Republic of Yugoslavia) OFK Belgrade
12	GK	Srboljub Krivokuća	14 March 1928 (aged 34)	7	(Socialist Federal Republic of Yugoslavia) OFK Belgrade
13	DF	Slavko Svinjarević	16 April 1935 (aged 27)	1	(Socialist Federal Republic of Yugoslavia) Vojvodina Novi Sad
14	DF	Vasilije Šijaković	31 July 1929 (aged 32)	10	(Socialist Federal Republic of Yugoslavia) OFK Belgrade
15	MF	Željko Matuš	9 August 1935 (aged 26)	9	(Socialist Federal Republic of Yugoslavia) Dinamo Zagreb
16	FW	Muhamed Mujić	25 April 1933 (aged 29)	31	(Socialist Federal Republic of Yugoslavia) Velež Mostar
17	MF	Vojislav Melić	5 January 1940 (aged 22)	0	(Socialist Federal Republic of Yugoslavia) Red Star Belgrade
18	MF	Vladica Kovačević	7 January 1940 (aged 22)	4	(Socialist Federal Republic of Yugoslavia) Partizan
19	GK	Mirko Stojanović	11 June 1939 (aged 22)	2	(Socialist Federal Republic of Yugoslavia) Dinamo Zagreb
20	DF	Žarko Nikolić	16 October 1938 (aged 23)	9	(Socialist Federal Republic of Yugoslavia) Vojvodina Novi Sad
21	FW	Nikola Stipić	18 December 1937 (aged 24)	0	(Socialist Federal Republic of Yugoslavia) Red Star Belgrade
22	MF	Aleksandar Ivoš	28 June 1931 (aged 30)	0	(Socialist Federal Republic of Yugoslavia) Sloboda Tuzla

=== Uruguay ===
Head coach: Juan Carlos Corazzo

No.	Pos.	Player	Date of birth (age)	Caps	Club
1	GK	Roberto Sosa	14 June 1935 (aged 26)	11	(Uruguay) Nacional
2	DF	Horacio Troche (captain)	14 February 1936 (aged 26)	16	(Uruguay) Nacional
3	DF	Emilio Álvarez	10 February 1939 (aged 23)	5	(Uruguay) Nacional
4	DF	Mario Méndez	11 May 1938 (aged 24)	7	(Uruguay) Nacional
5	MF	Néstor Gonçalves	27 April 1936 (aged 26)	25	(Uruguay) Peñarol
6	MF	Pedro Cubilla	25 May 1933 (aged 29)	7	(Uruguay) Rampla Juniors
7	FW	Domingo Pérez	7 June 1936 (aged 25)	10	(Uruguay) Nacional
8	MF	Julio César Cortés	29 March 1941 (aged 21)	1	(Uruguay) Sud América
9	FW	José Sasía	27 December 1933 (aged 28)	33	(Uruguay) Peñarol
10	MF	Pedro Rocha	3 December 1942 (aged 19)	4	(Uruguay) Peñarol
11	FW	Luis Cubilla	28 March 1940 (aged 22)	12	(Uruguay) Peñarol
12	GK	Luis Maidana	24 February 1934 (aged 28)	9	(Uruguay) Peñarol
14	DF	William Martínez	13 January 1928 (aged 34)	43	(Uruguay) Peñarol
15	DF	Rubén Soria	23 January 1935 (aged 27)	3	(Uruguay) Cerro
16	MF	Edgardo González	30 September 1936 (aged 25)	21	(Uruguay) Peñarol
17	DF	Rubén González	17 July 1939 (aged 22)	10	(Uruguay) Nacional
18	DF	Eliseo Álvarez	9 August 1940 (aged 21)	0	(Uruguay) Nacional
19	MF	Ronald Langón	6 August 1939 (aged 22)	6	(Uruguay) Defensor
20	FW	Mario Ludovico Bergara	1 December 1937 (aged 24)	12	(Uruguay) Nacional
21	FW	Héctor Silva	1 February 1940 (aged 22)	6	(Uruguay) Danubio
22	FW	Ángel Cabrera	9 October 1939 (aged 22)	4	(Uruguay) Peñarol
23	FW	Guillermo Escalada	24 April 1936 (aged 26)	29	(Uruguay) Nacional

This squad had no player with the number 13 assigned.

=== Colombia ===
Head coach: (Argentina) Adolfo Pedernera

No.	Pos.	Player	Date of birth (age)	Caps	Club
1	GK	Efraín Sánchez	27 February 1926 (aged 36)	27	(Colombia) Independiente Medellín
2	GK	Achito Vivas	1 March 1934 (aged 28)	0	(Colombia) Deportivo Pereira
3	DF	Francisco Zuluaga (captain)	4 February 1929 (aged 33)	9	(Colombia) Independiente Santa Fe
4	DF	Aníbal Alzate	31 January 1933 (aged 29)	4	(Colombia) Deportes Tolima
5	DF	Jaime González	1 April 1938 (aged 24)	2	(Colombia) América de Cali
6	DF	Ignacio Calle	21 August 1931 (aged 30)	8	(Colombia) Atlético Nacional
7	DF	Carlos Aponte	24 January 1939 (aged 23)	1	(Colombia) Independiente Santa Fe
8	DF	Héctor Echeverry	10 April 1938 (aged 24)	5	(Colombia) Independiente Medellín
9	MF	Jaime Silva	10 October 1935 (aged 26)	12	(Colombia) Independiente Santa Fe
10	MF	Rolando Serrano	13 November 1938 (aged 23)	5	(Colombia) América de Cali
11	DF	Óscar López	2 April 1939 (aged 23)	4	(Colombia) Once Caldas
12	MF	Hernando Tovar	7 June 1938 (aged 23)	0	(Colombia) Independiente Santa Fe
13	FW	Germán Aceros	30 September 1938 (aged 23)	6	(Colombia) Deportivo Cali
14	FW	Luis Paz	25 June 1942 (aged 19)	0	(Colombia) América de Cali
15	MF	Marcos Coll	23 August 1935 (aged 26)	4	(Colombia) América de Cali
16	FW	Ignacio Pérez	19 December 1934 (aged 27)	4	(Colombia) Once Caldas
17	FW	Marino Klinger	7 February 1936 (aged 26)	3	(Colombia) Millonarios
18	FW	Eusebio Escobar	2 July 1936 (aged 25)	2	(Colombia) Deportivo Pereira
19	FW	Delio Gamboa	28 January 1936 (aged 26)	9	(Colombia) Millonarios
20	FW	Antonio Rada	13 June 1937 (aged 24)	2	(Colombia) Deportivo Pereira
21	FW	Héctor González	7 July 1937 (aged 24)	3	(Colombia) Independiente Santa Fe
22	FW	Jairo Arias	2 November 1938 (aged 23)	4	(Colombia) Atlético Nacional

== Group 2 ==
=== West Germany ===
Head coach: Sepp Herberger

No.	Pos.	Player	Date of birth (age)	Caps	Club
1	GK	Hans Tilkowski	12 July 1935 (aged 26)	18	(West Germany) Westfalia Herne
2	DF	Herbert Erhardt	6 July 1930 (aged 31)	45	(West Germany) Greuther Fürth
3	DF	Karl-Heinz Schnellinger	31 March 1939 (aged 23)	19	(West Germany) 1. FC Köln
4	DF	Willi Schulz	4 October 1938 (aged 23)	8	(West Germany) Schalke 04
5	DF	Leo Wilden	3 July 1936 (aged 25)	6	(West Germany) 1. FC Köln
6	MF	Horst Szymaniak	29 August 1934 (aged 27)	33	(Italy) Catania
7	MF	Willi Koslowski	17 February 1937 (aged 25)	1	(West Germany) Schalke 04
8	FW	Helmut Haller	21 July 1939 (aged 22)	16	(West Germany) BC Augsburg
9	FW	Uwe Seeler	5 November 1936 (aged 25)	30	(West Germany) Hamburger SV
10	MF	Albert Brülls	26 March 1937 (aged 25)	18	(West Germany) Borussia Mönchengladbach
11	FW	Hans Schäfer (captain)	19 October 1927 (aged 34)	35	(West Germany) 1. FC Köln
12	DF	Hans Nowak	9 August 1937 (aged 24)	3	(West Germany) Schalke 04
13	DF	Jürgen Kurbjuhn	26 July 1940 (aged 21)	1	(West Germany) Hamburger SV
14	DF	Jürgen Werner	15 August 1935 (aged 26)	2	(West Germany) Hamburger SV
15	MF	Willi Giesemann	2 September 1937 (aged 24)	9	(West Germany) Bayern Munich
16	MF	Hans Sturm	3 September 1935 (aged 26)	2	(West Germany) 1. FC Köln
17	FW	Engelbert Kraus	30 July 1934 (aged 27)	5	(West Germany) Kickers Offenbach
18	MF	Günther Herrmann	1 September 1939 (aged 22)	7	(West Germany) Karlsruher SC
19	FW	Heinz Strehl	20 July 1938 (aged 23)	0	(West Germany) 1. FC Nürnberg
20	FW	Heinz Vollmar	26 April 1936 (aged 26)	12	(West Germany) 1. FC Saarbrücken
21	GK	Günter Sawitzki	22 November 1932 (aged 29)	9	(West Germany) VfB Stuttgart
22	GK	Wolfgang Fahrian	31 May 1941 (aged 20)	1	(West Germany) TSG Ulm

=== Chile ===
Head coach: Fernando Riera

No.	Pos.	Player	Date of birth (age)	Caps	Club
1	GK	Misael Escuti	20 December 1926 (aged 35)	31	(Chile) Colo-Colo
2	DF	Luis Eyzaguirre	22 June 1939 (aged 22)	19	Universidad de Chile
3	DF	Raúl Sánchez	26 October 1933 (aged 28)	21	(Chile) Santiago Wanderers
4	DF	Sergio Navarro (captain)	20 November 1936 (aged 25)	26	Universidad de Chile
5	DF	Carlos Contreras	7 October 1938 (aged 23)	6	Universidad de Chile
6	MF	Eladio Rojas	8 November 1934 (aged 27)	11	(Chile) Everton
7	FW	Jaime Ramírez	14 August 1931 (aged 30)	39	Universidad de Chile
8	MF	Jorge Toro	10 January 1939 (aged 23)	15	(Chile) Colo-Colo
9	FW	Honorino Landa	1 June 1942 (aged 19)	4	(Chile) Unión Española
10	FW	Alberto Fouilloux	22 November 1940 (aged 21)	15	(Chile) Universidad Católica
11	FW	Leonel Sánchez	25 April 1936 (aged 26)	45	Universidad de Chile
12	GK	Adán Godoy	26 November 1936 (aged 25)	0	(Chile) Santiago Morning
13	DF	Sergio Valdés	11 May 1933 (aged 29)	16	(Chile) Universidad Católica
14	DF	Hugo Lepe	14 April 1940 (aged 22)	1	(Chile) Santiago Morning
15	DF	Manuel Rodríguez	18 January 1938 (aged 24)	2	(Chile) Unión Española
16	DF	Humberto Cruz	8 December 1939 (aged 22)	2	(Chile) Santiago Morning
17	MF	Mario Ortiz	28 January 1936 (aged 26)	12	(Chile) Colo-Colo
18	FW	Mario Moreno	31 December 1935 (aged 26)	24	(Chile) Colo-Colo
19	FW	Braulio Musso	8 March 1930 (aged 32)	14	Universidad de Chile
20	FW	Carlos Campos	14 February 1937 (aged 25)	2	Universidad de Chile
21	FW	Armando Tobar	7 June 1938 (aged 23)	17	(Chile) Universidad Católica
22	GK	Manuel Astorga	15 May 1937 (aged 25)	5	Universidad de Chile

=== Italy ===
Head coach: Giovanni Ferrari and Paolo Mazza

No.	Pos.	Player	Date of birth (age)	Caps	Club
1	GK	Lorenzo Buffon (captain)	19 December 1929 (aged 32)	13	(Italy) Internazionale
2	DF	Giacomo Losi	9 November 1935 (aged 26)	9	(Italy) Roma
3	DF	Luigi Radice	15 January 1935 (aged 27)	2	(Italy) Milan
4	DF	Sandro Salvadore	29 November 1939 (aged 22)	5	(Italy) Milan
5	DF	Cesare Maldini	5 February 1932 (aged 30)	6	(Italy) Milan
6	MF	Giovanni Trapattoni	17 March 1939 (aged 23)	7	(Italy) Milan
7	FW	Bruno Mora	29 March 1937 (aged 25)	9	(Italy) Juventus
8	FW	Humberto Maschio	20 February 1933 (aged 29)	1	(Italy) Atalanta
9	FW	José Altafini	24 July 1938 (aged 23)	4	(Italy) Milan
10	FW	Omar Sívori	2 October 1935 (aged 26)	7	(Italy) Juventus
11	FW	Giampaolo Menichelli	29 June 1938 (aged 23)	2	(Italy) Roma
12	GK	Carlo Mattrel	14 April 1937 (aged 25)	1	(Italy) Palermo
13	GK	Enrico Albertosi	2 November 1939 (aged 22)	1	(Italy) Fiorentina
14	MF	Gianni Rivera	18 August 1943 (aged 18)	1	(Italy) Milan
15	FW	Angelo Sormani	3 July 1939 (aged 22)	0	(Italy) Mantova
16	DF	Enzo Robotti	13 June 1935 (aged 26)	6	(Italy) Fiorentina
17	FW	Ezio Pascutti	1 June 1937 (aged 24)	1	(Italy) Bologna
18	DF	Mario David	3 January 1934 (aged 28)	2	(Italy) Milan
19	DF	Francesco Janich	27 March 1937 (aged 25)	0	(Italy) Bologna
20	DF	Paride Tumburus	8 March 1939 (aged 23)	0	(Italy) Bologna
21	MF	Giorgio Ferrini	18 August 1939 (aged 22)	1	(Italy) Torino
22	MF	Giacomo Bulgarelli	24 October 1940 (aged 21)	0	(Italy) Bologna

=== Switzerland ===
Head coach: (Austria) Karl Rappan

No.	Pos.	Player	Date of birth (age)	Caps	Club
1	GK	Karl Elsener	13 August 1934 (aged 27)	13	(Switzerland) Grasshopper
2	GK	Antonio Permunian	15 August 1930 (aged 31)	11	(Switzerland) Luzern
3	GK	Kurt Stettler	21 August 1932 (aged 29)	1	(Switzerland) Basel
4	DF	Willy Kernen	6 August 1929 (aged 32)	41	(Switzerland) La Chaux-de-Fonds
5	DF	Fritz Morf	29 January 1928 (aged 34)	6	(Switzerland) Grenchen
6	DF	Peter Rösch	15 September 1930 (aged 31)	5	(Switzerland) Servette
7	DF	Heinz Schneiter	12 April 1935 (aged 27)	20	(Switzerland) Young Boys
8	DF	Ely Tacchella	25 May 1936 (aged 26)	5	(Switzerland) Lausanne-Sport
9	DF	André Grobéty	22 June 1933 (aged 28)	22	(Switzerland) Lausanne-Sport
10	DF	Fritz Kehl	12 July 1937 (aged 24)	0	(Switzerland) Zürich
11	DF	Eugen Meier	30 April 1930 (aged 32)	41	(Switzerland) Young Boys
12	FW	Marcel Vonlanthen	8 September 1933 (aged 28)	0	(Switzerland) Lausanne-Sport
13	MF	Hans Weber	8 September 1934 (aged 27)	15	(Switzerland) Basel
14	MF	Anton Allemann	6 January 1936 (aged 26)	17	(Italy) Mantova
15	FW	Charles Antenen (captain)	3 November 1929 (aged 32)	53	(Switzerland) La Chaux-de-Fonds
16	FW	Richard Dürr	1 December 1938 (aged 23)	1	(Switzerland) Lausanne-Sport
17	FW	Norbert Eschmann	19 March 1933 (aged 29)	7	(France) Stade Français
18	FW	Philippe Pottier	9 July 1938 (aged 23)	8	(France) Stade Français
19	FW	Gilbert Rey	30 October 1930 (aged 31)	6	(Switzerland) Lausanne-Sport
20	MF	Roger Vonlanthen	5 December 1930 (aged 31)	24	(Switzerland) Lausanne-Sport
21	FW	Rolf Wüthrich	4 September 1938 (aged 23)	5	(Switzerland) Servette
22	FW	Roberto Frigerio	16 May 1938 (aged 24)	0	(Switzerland) La Chaux-de-Fonds

== Group 3 ==
=== Brazil ===
Head coach: Aymoré Moreira

No.	Pos.	Player	Date of birth (age)	Caps	Club
1	GK	Gilmar	22 August 1930 (aged 31)	63	(Brazil) Santos
2	DF	Djalma Santos	27 February 1929 (aged 33)	71	(Brazil) Palmeiras
3	DF	Mauro Ramos (captain)	30 August 1930 (aged 31)	17	(Brazil) Santos
4	MF	Zito	18 August 1932 (aged 29)	29	(Brazil) Santos
5	DF	Zózimo	19 June 1932 (aged 29)	29	(Brazil) Bangu
6	DF	Nílton Santos	16 May 1925 (aged 37)	69	(Brazil) Botafogo
7	FW	Garrincha	28 October 1933 (aged 28)	31	(Brazil) Botafogo
8	MF	Didi	8 October 1928 (aged 33)	62	(Brazil) Botafogo
9	FW	Coutinho	11 June 1943 (aged 18)	10	(Brazil) Santos
10	FW	Pelé	23 October 1940 (aged 21)	30	(Brazil) Santos
11	FW	Pepe	25 February 1935 (aged 27)	25	(Brazil) Santos
12	DF	Jair Marinho	17 July 1936 (aged 25)	4	(Brazil) Fluminense
13	DF	Hilderaldo Bellini	7 June 1930 (aged 31)	37	(Brazil) São Paulo
14	DF	Jurandir	12 November 1940 (aged 21)	2	(Brazil) São Paulo
15	DF	Altair	21 January 1938 (aged 24)	5	(Brazil) Fluminense
16	MF	Zequinha	18 November 1934 (aged 27)	10	(Brazil) Palmeiras
17	MF	Mengálvio	17 December 1939 (aged 22)	7	(Brazil) Santos
18	FW	Jair da Costa	9 July 1940 (aged 21)	1	(Brazil) Portuguesa
19	FW	Vavá	12 November 1934 (aged 27)	13	(Brazil) Palmeiras
20	FW	Amarildo	29 June 1939 (aged 22)	6	(Brazil) Botafogo
21	FW	Mário Zagallo	9 August 1931 (aged 30)	21	(Brazil) Botafogo
22	GK	Castilho	27 November 1927 (aged 34)	25	(Brazil) Fluminense

=== Czechoslovakia ===
Head coach: Rudolf Vytlačil

No.	Pos.	Player	Date of birth (age)	Caps	Club
1	GK	Viliam Schrojf	2 August 1931 (aged 30)	22	(Czechoslovakia) Slovan Bratislava
2	DF	Jan Lála	10 September 1936 (aged 25)	1	(Czechoslovakia) Dynamo Praha
3	DF	Ján Popluhár	12 August 1935 (aged 26)	27	(Czechoslovakia) Slovan Bratislava
4	DF	Ladislav Novák (captain)	5 December 1931 (aged 30)	59	(Czechoslovakia) Dukla Prague
5	DF	Svatopluk Pluskal	28 October 1930 (aged 31)	38	(Czechoslovakia) Dukla Prague
6	MF	Josef Masopust	9 February 1931 (aged 31)	44	(Czechoslovakia) Dukla Prague
7	MF	Jozef Štibrányi	11 April 1940 (aged 22)	3	(Czechoslovakia) Spartak Trnava
8	FW	Adolf Scherer	5 May 1938 (aged 24)	18	(Czechoslovakia) TJ Slovnaft Bratislava
9	FW	Pavol Molnár	13 February 1936 (aged 26)	20	(Czechoslovakia) Slovan Bratislava
10	FW	Jozef Adamec	26 February 1942 (aged 20)	4	(Czechoslovakia) Dukla Prague
11	FW	Josef Jelínek	9 January 1941 (aged 21)	4	(Czechoslovakia) Dukla Prague
12	DF	Jiří Tichý	6 December 1933 (aged 28)	13	(Czechoslovakia) TJ Slovnaft Bratislava
13	GK	František Schmucker	28 January 1940 (aged 22)	1	(Czechoslovakia) RH Brno
14	FW	Václav Mašek	21 March 1941 (aged 21)	7	(Czechoslovakia) Spartak Praha Sokolovo
15	FW	Vladimír Kos	9 August 1935 (aged 26)	1	(Czechoslovakia) CKD Praha
16	DF	Titus Buberník	12 October 1933 (aged 28)	17	(Czechoslovakia) TJ Slovnaft Bratislava
17	FW	Tomáš Pospíchal	26 June 1936 (aged 25)	10	(Czechoslovakia) Baník Ostrava
18	FW	Josef Kadraba	29 September 1933 (aged 28)	9	(Czechoslovakia) SONP Kladno
19	FW	Andrej Kvašňák	19 May 1936 (aged 26)	12	(Czechoslovakia) Spartak Praha Sokolovo
20	FW	Jaroslav Borovička	26 January 1931 (aged 31)	21	(Czechoslovakia) Dukla Prague
21	GK	Pavel Kouba	1 September 1938 (aged 23)	0	(Czechoslovakia) Dukla Prague
22	DF	Jozef Bomba	30 March 1939 (aged 23)	6	(Czechoslovakia) Tatran Prešov

=== Mexico ===
Head coach: Ignacio Tréllez

No.	Pos.	Player	Date of birth (age)	Caps	Club
1	GK	Antonio Carbajal (captain)	7 June 1929 (aged 32)	39	(Mexico) León
2	DF	Jesús del Muro	30 November 1937 (aged 24)	13	(Mexico) Atlas
3	DF	Guillermo Sepúlveda	29 November 1934 (aged 27)	16	(Mexico) Guadalajara
4	DF	José Villegas	20 June 1934 (aged 27)	19	(Mexico) Guadalajara
5	DF	Raúl Cárdenas	30 October 1928 (aged 33)	34	(Mexico) Zacatepec
6	MF	Pedro Nájera	3 February 1929 (aged 33)	24	(Mexico) América
7	FW	Alfredo del Águila	3 January 1935 (aged 27)	26	(Mexico) Toluca
8	MF	Salvador Reyes	20 September 1936 (aged 25)	37	(Mexico) Guadalajara
9	FW	Héctor Hernández	6 December 1935 (aged 26)	15	(Mexico) Guadalajara
10	FW	Guillermo Ortiz Camargo	25 June 1939 (aged 22)	8	(Mexico) Necaxa
11	FW	Isidoro Díaz	14 March 1940 (aged 22)	10	(Mexico) Guadalajara
12	GK	Jaime Gómez	29 December 1929 (aged 32)	9	(Mexico) Guadalajara
13	DF	Arturo Chaires	14 March 1937 (aged 25)	5	(Mexico) Guadalajara
14	MF	Pedro Romero	12 April 1937 (aged 25)	0	(Mexico) Toluca
15	DF	Ignacio Jáuregui	31 July 1938 (aged 23)	13	(Mexico) Atlas
16	MF	Salvador Farfán	22 June 1932 (aged 29)	2	(Mexico) Atlante
17	FW	Felipe Ruvalcaba	16 February 1941 (aged 21)	0	(Mexico) Oro
18	FW	Alfredo Hernández	18 June 1935 (aged 26)	5	(Mexico) Monterrey
19	FW	Antonio Jasso	11 March 1935 (aged 27)	16	(Mexico) América
20	MF	Mario Velarde	29 March 1940 (aged 22)	0	(Mexico) Necaxa
21	FW	Alberto Baeza	6 December 1938 (aged 23)	0	(Mexico) Necaxa
22	GK	Antonio Mota	26 January 1939 (aged 23)	2	(Mexico) Oro

=== Spain ===
Head coach: (Argentina) Helenio Herrera

No.	Pos.	Player	Date of birth (age)	Caps	Club
1	GK	José Araquistáin	4 March 1937 (aged 25)	5	(Spain) Real Madrid
2	GK	Salvador Sadurní	3 April 1941 (aged 21)	0	(Spain) Barcelona
3	GK	Carmelo Cedrún	6 December 1930 (aged 31)	10	(Spain) Atlético Bilbao
4	FW	Enrique Collar	2 November 1934 (aged 27)	10	(Spain) Atlético Madrid
5	MF	Luis del Sol	6 April 1935 (aged 27)	10	(Spain) Real Madrid
6	FW	Alfredo Di Stéfano	4 July 1926 (aged 35)	31	(Spain) Real Madrid
7	DF	Luis María Echeberría	24 March 1940 (aged 22)	0	(Spain) Atlético Bilbao
8	DF	Jesús Garay	10 September 1930 (aged 31)	28	(Spain) Barcelona
9	FW	Francisco Gento	21 October 1933 (aged 28)	26	(Spain) Real Madrid
10	DF	Sígfrid Gràcia	27 March 1932 (aged 30)	8	(Spain) Barcelona
11	DF	Feliciano Rivilla	21 August 1936 (aged 25)	9	(Spain) Atlético Madrid
12	MF	Joaquín Peiró	29 January 1936 (aged 26)	7	(Spain) Atlético Madrid
13	DF	Pachín	28 December 1938 (aged 23)	4	(Spain) Real Madrid
14	FW	Ferenc Puskás	2 April 1927 (aged 35)	1	(Spain) Real Madrid
15	FW	Eulogio Martínez	11 June 1935 (aged 26)	7	(Spain) Barcelona
16	DF	Severino Reija	25 November 1938 (aged 23)	0	(Spain) Zaragoza
17	DF	Rodri	8 March 1934 (aged 28)	0	(Spain) Barcelona
18	MF	Adelardo	26 September 1939 (aged 22)	0	(Spain) Atlético Madrid
19	DF	José Santamaría	31 July 1929 (aged 32)	14	(Spain) Real Madrid
20	DF	Joan Segarra (captain)	15 November 1927 (aged 34)	24	(Spain) Barcelona
21	MF	Luis Suárez	2 May 1935 (aged 27)	22	(Italy) Internazionale
22	MF	Martí Vergés	8 March 1934 (aged 28)	10	(Spain) Barcelona

== Group 4 ==
=== Hungary ===
Head coach: Lajos Baróti

No.	Pos.	Player	Date of birth (age)	Caps	Club
1	GK	Gyula Grosics (captain)	4 February 1926 (aged 36)	81	(Hungary) Tatabánya
2	DF	Sándor Mátrai	20 November 1932 (aged 29)	41	(Hungary) Ferencváros
3	DF	Kálmán Mészöly	16 July 1941 (aged 20)	4	(Hungary) Vasas
4	DF	László Sárosi	27 February 1932 (aged 30)	25	(Hungary) Vasas
5	DF	Ernő Solymosi	21 September 1940 (aged 21)	16	(Hungary) Újpest
6	MF	Ferenc Sipos	13 December 1932 (aged 29)	44	(Hungary) MTK Budapest
7	FW	Károly Sándor	29 November 1928 (aged 33)	58	(Hungary) MTK Budapest
8	FW	János Göröcs	8 May 1939 (aged 23)	32	(Hungary) Újpest
9	FW	Flórián Albert	15 September 1941 (aged 20)	23	(Hungary) Ferencváros
10	MF	Lajos Tichy	21 March 1935 (aged 27)	53	(Hungary) Budapest Honvéd
11	FW	Máté Fenyvesi	20 September 1933 (aged 28)	42	(Hungary) Ferencváros
12	DF	Kálmán Sóvári	21 December 1940 (aged 21)	7	(Hungary) Újpest
13	DF	Kálmán Ihász	6 March 1941 (aged 21)	0	(Hungary) Vasas
14	MF	István Nagy	14 April 1939 (aged 23)	1	(Hungary) MTK Budapest
15	MF	János Mencel	14 December 1941 (aged 20)	0	(Hungary) Salgótarján
16	FW	János Farkas	27 March 1942 (aged 20)	4	(Hungary) Vasas
17	FW	Gyula Rákosi	9 October 1938 (aged 23)	3	(Hungary) Ferencváros
18	FW	Tivadar Monostori	24 August 1936 (aged 25)	5	(Hungary) Dorog
19	FW	Béla Kuharszki	20 April 1940 (aged 22)	5	(Hungary) Újpest
20	FW	László Bödör	17 August 1933 (aged 28)	1	(Hungary) MTK Budapest
21	GK	Antal Szentmihályi	13 June 1939 (aged 22)	1	(Hungary) Vasas
22	GK	István Ilku	6 March 1933 (aged 29)	6	(Hungary) Dorog

=== England ===
Head coach: Walter Winterbottom

No.	Pos.	Player	Date of birth (age)	Caps	Club
1	GK	Ron Springett	22 July 1935 (aged 26)	21	(England) Sheffield Wednesday
2	DF	Jimmy Armfield	2 September 1935 (aged 26)	25	(England) Blackpool
3	DF	Ray Wilson	17 December 1934 (aged 27)	11	(England) Huddersfield Town
4	MF	Bobby Robson	18 February 1933 (aged 29)	20	(England) West Bromwich Albion
5	DF	Peter Swan	8 October 1936 (aged 25)	19	(England) Sheffield Wednesday
6	MF	Ron Flowers	28 July 1934 (aged 27)	32	(England) Wolverhampton Wanderers
7	MF	John Connelly	18 July 1938 (aged 23)	8	(England) Burnley
8	FW	Jimmy Greaves	20 February 1940 (aged 22)	18	(England) Tottenham Hotspur
9	FW	Gerry Hitchens	8 October 1934 (aged 27)	5	(Italy) Internazionale
10	FW	Johnny Haynes (captain)	17 October 1934 (aged 27)	52	(England) Fulham
11	FW	Bobby Charlton	11 October 1937 (aged 24)	35	(England) Manchester United
12	GK	Alan Hodgkinson	16 August 1936 (aged 25)	5	(England) Sheffield United
13	FW	Derek Kevan*	6 March 1935 (aged 27)	14	(England) West Bromwich Albion
14	MF	Stan Anderson	27 February 1933 (aged 29)	2	(England) Sunderland
15	DF	Maurice Norman	8 May 1934 (aged 28)	1	(England) Tottenham Hotspur
16	DF	Bobby Moore	12 April 1941 (aged 21)	1	(England) West Ham United
17	MF	Bryan Douglas	27 May 1934 (aged 28)	29	(England) Blackburn Rovers
18	FW	Roger Hunt	20 July 1938 (aged 23)	1	(England) Liverpool
19	FW	Alan Peacock	29 October 1937 (aged 24)	0	(England) Middlesbrough
20	MF	George Eastham	23 September 1936 (aged 25)	0	(England) Arsenal
21	DF	Don Howe	12 October 1935 (aged 26)	23	(England) West Bromwich Albion
22	MF	Jimmy Adamson*	4 April 1929 (aged 33)	0	(England) Burnley

Derek Kevan was a stay-at-home reserve. Jimmy Adamson, officially part of the squad, acted as assistant manager. The squad list at FIFA's website lists Gordon Banks instead of Adamson; according to another source, Banks was intended to be a stay-at-home reserve too but was eventually omitted from the list.

=== Argentina ===
Head coach: Juan Carlos Lorenzo

No.	Pos.	Player	Date of birth (age)	Caps	Club
1	GK	Antonio Roma	13 July 1932 (aged 29)	20	(Argentina) Boca Juniors
2	DF	José Ramos Delgado	26 August 1935 (aged 26)	8	(Argentina) River Plate
3	DF	Silvio Marzolini	4 October 1940 (aged 21)	6	(Argentina) Boca Juniors
4	DF	Alberto Sainz	13 December 1937 (aged 24)	3	(Argentina) River Plate
5	MF	Federico Sacchi	9 August 1936 (aged 25)	10	(Argentina) Racing
6	DF	Raúl Páez	26 May 1937 (aged 25)	1	(Argentina) San Lorenzo
7	FW	Héctor Facundo	2 November 1937 (aged 24)	5	(Argentina) San Lorenzo
8	FW	Martín Pando	26 December 1934 (aged 27)	12	(Argentina) River Plate
9	FW	Marcelo Pagani	19 August 1941 (aged 20)	4	(Argentina) River Plate
10	FW	José Sanfilippo	4 May 1935 (aged 27)	27	(Argentina) San Lorenzo
11	FW	Raúl Belén	1 July 1931 (aged 30)	26	(Argentina) Racing
12	GK	Rogelio Domínguez	9 March 1932 (aged 30)	20	(Argentina) River Plate
13	MF	Oscar Rossi	27 July 1930 (aged 31)	14	(Argentina) San Lorenzo
14	DF	Alberto Mariotti	23 August 1935 (aged 26)	1	(Argentina) San Lorenzo
15	DF	Rubén Navarro (captain)	11 March 1933 (aged 29)	19	(Argentina) Independiente
16	MF	Antonio Rattín	16 May 1937 (aged 25)	8	(Argentina) Boca Juniors
17	DF	Rafael Albrecht	28 August 1941 (aged 20)	5	(Argentina) Estudiantes (LP)
18	DF	Vladislao Cap	5 July 1934 (aged 27)	8	(Argentina) River Plate
19	FW	Rubén Sosa	14 November 1936 (aged 25)	16	(Argentina) Racing
20	FW	Juan Carlos Oleniak	4 March 1942 (aged 20)	3	(Argentina) Argentinos Juniors
21	MF	Ramón Abeledo	29 April 1937 (aged 25)	6	(Argentina) Independiente
22	FW	Alberto González	21 August 1941 (aged 20)	7	(Argentina) Boca Juniors

=== Bulgaria ===
Head coach: Georgi Pachedzhiev

No.	Pos.	Player	Date of birth (age)	Caps	Club
1	GK	Georgi Naydenov	21 December 1931 (aged 30)	39	(Bulgaria) CDNA Sofia
2	DF	Kiril Rakarov (captain)	24 May 1932 (aged 30)	56	(Bulgaria) CDNA Sofia
3	DF	Ivan Dimitrov	14 May 1935 (aged 27)	30	(Bulgaria) Lokomotiv Sofia
4	MF	Stoyan Kitov	27 August 1938 (aged 23)	7	(Bulgaria) Spartak Sofia
5	DF	Dimitar Kostov	26 July 1936 (aged 25)	2	(Bulgaria) Slavia Sofia
6	MF	Nikola Kovachev	4 June 1934 (aged 27)	38	(Bulgaria) CDNA Sofia
7	MF	Todor Diev	28 January 1934 (aged 28)	38	(Bulgaria) Spartak Plovdiv
8	DF	Dimitar Dimov	13 December 1937 (aged 24)	5	(Bulgaria) Spartak Plovdiv
9	FW	Hristo Iliev	11 May 1936 (aged 26)	17	(Bulgaria) Levski Sofia
10	FW	Ivan Kolev	1 November 1930 (aged 31)	60	(Bulgaria) CDNA Sofia
11	FW	Dimitar Yakimov	12 July 1941 (aged 20)	19	(Bulgaria) CDNA Sofia
12	DF	Dobromir Zhechev	12 November 1942 (aged 19)	3	(Bulgaria) Spartak Sofia
13	FW	Petar Velichkov	8 August 1940 (aged 21)	4	(Bulgaria) Slavia Sofia
14	FW	Georgi Sokolov	19 June 1942 (aged 19)	6	(Bulgaria) Levski Sofia
15	FW	Georgi Asparuhov	4 May 1943 (aged 19)	1	(Bulgaria) Botev Plovdiv
16	MF	Aleksandar Kostov	5 March 1938 (aged 24)	1	(Bulgaria) Levski Sofia
17	MF	Panteley Dimitrov	2 November 1940 (aged 21)	0	(Bulgaria) CDNA Sofia
18	GK	Ivan Ivanov	1 January 1942 (aged 20)	0	(Bulgaria) Cherno More
19	FW	Dinko Dermendzhiev	2 June 1941 (aged 20)	1	(Bulgaria) Botev Plovdiv
20	GK	Nikola Parshanov	16 February 1934 (aged 28)	2	(Bulgaria) Spartak Pleven
21	FW	Panayot Panayotov	30 December 1930 (aged 31)	45	(Bulgaria) CDNA Sofia
22	FW	Georgi Dimitrov	1 May 1931 (aged 31)	0	(Bulgaria) Cherno More

== Notes ==
Each national team had to submit a squad of 22 players. All the teams included 3 goalkeepers, except Uruguay, Colombia, Brazil, England and Argentina who only called two.

== Coaches representation by country ==
Nº	Country	Coaches
3	Argentina	Juan Carlos Lorenzo, Helenio Herrera (Spain), Adolfo Pedernera (Colombia)
2	Italy	Giovanni Ferrari, Paolo Mazza
2	(Socialist Federal Republic of Yugoslavia) Yugoslavia	Ljubomir Lovrić, Prvoslav Mihajlović
1	Austria	Karl Rappan (Switzerland)
1	Brazil	Aymoré Moreira
1	Bulgaria	Georgi Pachedzhiev
1	Chile	Fernando Riera
1	Czechoslovakia	Rudolf Vytlačil
1	England	Walter Winterbottom
1	Hungary	Lajos Baróti
1	Mexico	Ignacio Tréllez
1	Soviet Union	Gavril Kachalin
1	Uruguay	Juan Carlos Corazzo
1	West Germany	Sepp Herberger
