= 1962 FIFA World Cup Group 4 =

Football tournament group stage

Group 4 of the 1962 FIFA World Cup took place from 30 May to 7 June 1962. The group consisted of Argentina, Bulgaria, England, and Hungary.

== Standings ==
Pos	Team	Pld	W	D	L	GF	GA	GR	Pts	Qualification
1	Hungary	3	2	1	0	8	2	4.000	5	Advance to knockout stage
2	England	3	1	1	1	4	3	1.333	3 (Note: England finished ahead of Argentina on goal average.)	Advance to knockout stage
3	Argentina	3	1	1	1	2	3	0.667	3	
4	Bulgaria	3	0	1	2	1	7	0.143	1	

Source: FIFA

== Matches ==
All times listed are local time.

=== Argentina vs Bulgaria ===
30 May 1962
15:00 CLT (UTC-04)

Argentina	1–0	Bulgaria
Facundo 4'

Estadio El Teniente, Rancagua
Attendance: 7,134
Referee: Juan Gardeazábal Garay (Spain)

Argentina
Bulgaria

GK	1	Antonio Roma
RB	4	Alberto Sainz
CB	15	Rubén Navarro (c)
CB	6	Raúl Páez
LB	3	Silvio Marzolini
MF	5	Federico Sacchi
MF	13	Oscar Rossi
OR	7	Héctor Facundo
IR	9	Marcelo Pagani
IL	10	José Sanfilippo
OL	11	Raúl Belén
Manager:
Juan Carlos Lorenzo

GK	1	Georgi Naydenov
RB	2	Kiril Rakarov (c)
CH	3	Ivan Dimitrov
LB	4	Stoyan Kitov
RH	5	Dimitar Kostov
LH	6	Nikola Kovachev
OR	7	Todor Diev
IR	13	Petar Velichkov
CF	9	Hristo Iliev
IL	10	Ivan Kolev
OL	11	Dimitar Yakimov
Manager:
Georgi Pachedzhiev

=== Hungary vs England ===
31 May 1962
15:00 CLT (UTC-04)

Hungary	2–1	England
Tichy 17'; Albert 71'		Flowers 60' (pen.)

Estadio El Teniente, Rancagua
Attendance: 7,938
Referee: Leo Horn (Netherlands)

Hungary
England

GK	1	Gyula Grosics (c)
RB	2	Sándor Mátrai
CB	3	Kálmán Mészöly
CB	6	Ferenc Sipos
LB	4	László Sárosi
MF	5	Ernő Solymosi
MF	17	Gyula Rákosi
RW	7	Károly Sándor
FW	9	Flórián Albert
FW	10	Lajos Tichy
LW	11	Máté Fenyvesi
Manager:
(Hungary) Lajos Baróti

GK	1	Ron Springett
RB	2	Jimmy Armfield
CH	15	Maurice Norman
LB	3	Ray Wilson
RH	16	Bobby Moore
LH	6	Ron Flowers
OR	17	Bryan Douglas
IR	8	Jimmy Greaves
CF	9	Gerry Hitchens
IL	10	Johnny Haynes (c)
OL	11	Bobby Charlton
Manager:
(England) Walter Winterbottom

=== England vs Argentina ===
2 June 1962
15:00 CLT (UTC-04)

England	3–1	Argentina
Flowers 17' (pen.); Charlton 42'; Greaves 67'		Sanfilippo 81'

Estadio El Teniente, Rancagua
Attendance: 9,794
Referee: Nikolay Latyshev (Soviet Union)

England
Argentina

GK	1	Ron Springett
RB	2	Jimmy Armfield
CH	15	Maurice Norman
LB	3	Ray Wilson
RH	16	Bobby Moore
LH	6	Ron Flowers
OR	17	Bryan Douglas
IR	8	Jimmy Greaves
CF	19	Alan Peacock
IL	10	Johnny Haynes (c)
OL	11	Bobby Charlton
Manager:
Walter Winterbottom

GK	1	Antonio Roma
RB	18	Vladislao Cap
CB	15	Rubén Navarro (c)
CB	6	Raúl Páez
LB	3	Silvio Marzolini
MF	5	Federico Sacchi
MF	16	Antonio Rattín
OR	20	Juan Carlos Oleniak
IR	19	Rubén H. Sosa
IL	10	José Sanfilippo
OL	11	Raúl Belén
Manager:
Juan Carlos Lorenzo

=== Hungary vs Bulgaria ===
3 June 1962
15:00 CLT (UTC-04)

Hungary	6–1	Bulgaria
Albert 1', 6', 53'; Tichy 8', 70'; Solymosi 12'		Sokolov 64' (Note: RSSSF credits this goal to Georgi Asparuhov.)

Estadio El Teniente, Rancagua
Attendance: 7,442
Referee: Juan Gardeazábal Garay (Spain)

Hungary
Bulgaria

GK	22	István Ilku
RB	2	Sándor Mátrai
CB	3	Kálmán Mészöly
CB	6	Ferenc Sipos
LB	4	László Sárosi (c)
MF	5	Ernő Solymosi
MF	8	János Göröcs
RW	7	Károly Sándor
FW	9	Flórián Albert
FW	10	Lajos Tichy
LW	11	Máté Fenyvesi
Manager:
(Hungary) Lajos Baróti

GK	1	Georgi Naydenov
RB	2	Kiril Rakarov (c)
CH	3	Ivan Dimitrov
LB	4	Stoyan Kitov
RH	5	Dimitar Kostov
LH	6	Nikola Kovachev
OR	14	Georgi Sokolov
IR	13	Petar Velichkov
CF	15	Georgi Asparuhov
IL	10	Ivan Kolev
OL	19	Dinko Dermendzhiev
Manager:
(Bulgaria) Georgi Pachedzhiev

=== Hungary vs Argentina ===
6 June 1962
15:00 CLT (UTC-04)

Hungary	0–0	Argentina

Estadio El Teniente, Rancagua
Attendance: 7,945
Referee: Arturo Yamasaki Maldonado (Peru)

Hungary
Argentina

GK	1	Gyula Grosics (c)
RB	2	Sándor Mátrai
CB	3	Kálmán Mészöly
CB	6	Ferenc Sipos
LB	4	László Sárosi
MF	5	Ernő Solymosi
MF	17	Gyula Rákosi
RW	19	Béla Kuharszki
FW	10	Lajos Tichy
SS	8	János Göröcs
LW	18	Tivadar Monostori
Manager:
(Hungary) Lajos Baróti

GK	12	Rogelio Dominguez
RB	4	Alberto Sainz
CB	2	José Ramos Delgado
CB	5	Federico Sacchi
LB	3	Silvio Marzolini
RH	18	Vladislao Cap
LH	22	Alberto Mario González
AM	8	Martín Pando (c)
RW	7	Héctor Facundo
CF	9	Marcelo Pagani
LW	20	Juan Carlos Oleniak
Manager:
(Argentina) Juan Carlos Lorenzo

=== England vs Bulgaria ===
7 June 1962
15:00 CLT (UTC-04)

England	0–0	Bulgaria

Estadio El Teniente, Rancagua
Attendance: 5,700
Referee: Antoine Blavier (Belgium)

England
Bulgaria

GK	1	Ron Springett
RB	2	Jimmy Armfield
CH	15	Maurice Norman
LB	3	Ray Wilson
RH	16	Bobby Moore
LH	6	Ron Flowers
OR	17	Bryan Douglas
IR	8	Jimmy Greaves
CF	19	Alan Peacock
IL	10	Johnny Haynes (c)
OL	11	Bobby Charlton
Manager:
(England) Walter Winterbottom

GK	1	Georgi Naydenov
RB	8	Dimitar Dimov
CH	3	Ivan Dimitrov
LB	12	Dobromir Zhechev
RH	5	Dimitar Kostov
LH	6	Nikola Kovachev (c)
OR	16	Aleksandar Kostov
IR	13	Petar Velichkov
CF	14	Georgi Sokolov
IL	10	Ivan Kolev
OL	19	Dinko Dermendzhiev
Manager:
(Bulgaria) Georgi Pachedzhiev

== See also ==
- Argentina at the FIFA World Cup
- Bulgaria at the FIFA World Cup
- England at the FIFA World Cup
- Hungary at the FIFA World Cup
