= Alberto Fouillioux =

Chilean footballer (1940-2018)

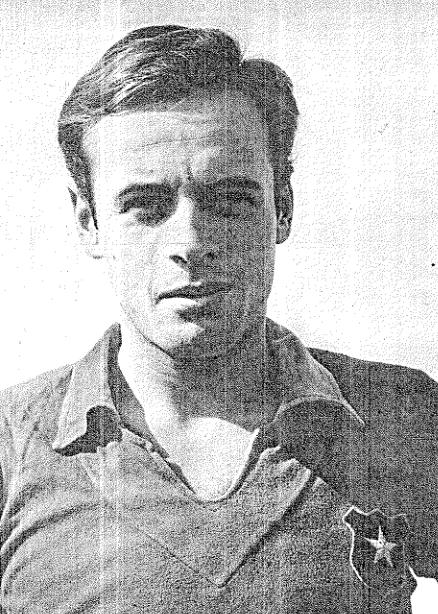
- Fouillioux in 1962

Personal information
- Full name: Alberto Jorge Fouillioux Ahumada
- Date of birth: 22 November 1940
- Place of birth: Santiago, Chile
- Date of death: 23 June 2018 (aged 77)
- Place of death: Santiago, Chile
- Positions: Midfielder; striker

Senior career*
Years	Team	Apps	(Gls)
1957–1969	Universidad Católica		
1970–1971	Huachipato		
1972	Unión Española		
1972–1974	Lille		
1975	Universidad Católica		

International career
1958	Chile U20		
1960–1972	Chile	70	(12)

Managerial career
- 1976: Universidad Católica
- 1977–1978: Huachipato
- 1978: Colo-Colo
Medal record
Men's football
Representing Chile
FIFA World Cup
Third place	1962 Chile
- * Club domestic league appearances and goals

Alberto Jorge Fouillioux Ahumada (22 November 1940 – 23 June 2018) was a Chilean football midfielder and striker who earned 70 caps and scored 12 goals for the Chile national team during his career.

== Career ==
Fouillioux made his debut for Universidad Católica in 1957. He was part of two championship winning sides in 1961 and 1966. He played for Chile in two World Cups; the 1962 and 1966.

On 6 April 1965, Fouillioux was one of the constituent footballers of SIFUP, the trade union of professionales footballers in Chile, alongside fellows such as Pedro Araya, Hugo Lepe, Misael Escuti, among others.

In 1969, he joined Huachipato and in 1972 he played for Unión Española. In the latter part of his career he played for Lille in France.

At youth international level, he represented Chile U20 in the 1958 South American Championship alongside players such as José Sulantay, Jorge Venegas, Efraín Santander, among others.

After retiring as a player Fouillioux went on to become a manager, serving as head coach of Huachipato and Colo-Colo.

Fouillioux died on 23 June 2018, aged 77 in his birth city of Santiago, Chile.

== Personal life ==
From 1989 to 2000, Fouillioux worked as a football commentator and analyst for the Chilean TV channel Canal 13, making a renowned pair alongside Néstor Isella in the TV program Futgol. In addition, he worked for Canal 11, Radio Nacional and Radio Agricultura.

His son Gonzalo, is a sports journalist who has worked for Fox Sports Chile and TNT Sports Chile. Another son, Alberto Jr., played for Chile at under-20 level in training matches for the 1987 FIFA World Youth Championship, but he didn't take part of the final squad.

== Honours ==
Universidad Católica

- Chilean Primera División (2): 1961, 1966

Chile

- FIFA World Cup third place: 1962
- Copa del Pacífico (2): 1965, 1968
- Copa Juan Pinto Durán (1): 1971
