= Manuel Astorga =

Chilean footballer (born 1937)

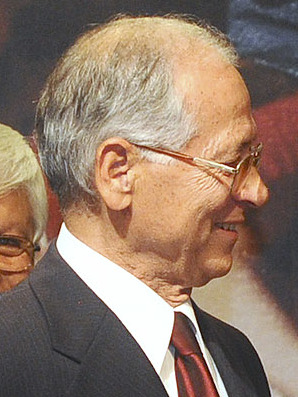
- Manuel Astorga in 2012

Personal information
- Full name: Manuel Miguel Astorga Carreño
- Date of birth: 15 May 1937 (age 89)
- Place of birth: Iquique, Chile
- Height: 1.75 m (5 ft 9 in)
- Position: Goalkeeper

Senior career*
| Years | Team | Apps | (Gls) |
| 1956–1967 | Universidad de Chile | | |
| 1968–1971 | Huachipato | | |
| 1972–1973 | Magallanes | | |
| 1973–1974 | Universidad de Chile | | |
| 1975–1976 | Audax Italiano | | |

International career
| 1960–1970 | Chile | 10 | (0) |
Medal record
Men's football
Representing Chile
FIFA World Cup
| Third place | 1962 Chile |
- * Club domestic league appearances and goals

Manuel Miguel Astorga Carreño (born 15 May 1937) is a Chilean kinesiologist and former footballer who played as a goalkeeper.

== Club career ==
He started his career in 1956 with Universidad de Chile and was part of the famous Ballet Azul (Blue Ballet), as it was nicknamed Universidad de Chile in the 1960s.

On 6 April 1965, Astorga was one of the constituent footballers of SIFUP, the trade union of professionales footballers in Chile, alongside fellows such as Efraín Santander, Francisco Valdés, Misael Escuti, among others.

== International career ==
He made 10 appearances for Chile between 1960 and 1970. Also, he was part of the Chile squad in the 1962 FIFA World Cup.

== Personal life ==
He is the father of Manuel Astorga Jr., a fitness coach who has worked with the former tennis players Marcelo Ríos, Nicolás Massú and Tommy Haas, in addition to several football teams.

After playing football, Astorga did mountain climbing, taking part of the Chile national team that reached the top of Mount Everest in 1983.

At the same time he was a footballer, he studied kinesiology and worked for both Universidad de Chile in the 1980s and Colo-Colo when the team became the Copa Libertadores champion, in addition to Deportes La Serena. Also, he has worked for Barros Luco Hospital and MEDS Clinic.

== Honours ==
=== Club ===
Universidad de Chile

- Primera División (5): 1959, 1962, 1964, 1965, 1967

=== Individual ===
- Primera División Best Goalkeeper (3): 1962, 1963, 1964
