= Jorge Venegas =

Chilean football manager and player

Personal information
- Full name: Jorge Arnaldo Venegas Vásquez
- Date of birth: 29 August 1939
- Place of birth: Chile
- Date of death: 7 September 2010 (aged 71)
- Place of death: La Ligua, Chile
- Position: Forward

Youth career
- Universidad de Chile

Senior career*
Years	Team	Apps	(Gls)
1954–1958	Universidad de Chile		
1962	Audax Italiano	7	(3)
1963	Coquimbo Unido	2	(1)

International career
1958	Chile U20		

Managerial career
- 1970–1971: Green Cross (youth)
- 1971: Chile U20
- 1971: Coquimbo Unido
- 1972: Audax Italiano (assistant)
- 1972: Audax Italiano
- 1973: Unión La Calera
- 1974: O'Higgins
- 1975: Luis Ángel Firpo
- 1975: Federal
- 1976: Malleco Unido
- 1977: Rangers
- 1978: Regional Antofagasta
- 1979: Malleco Unido
- 1980–1981: Unión San Felipe
- 1981: Santiago Wanderers
- 1982: Deportes Linares
- 1983: Magallanes
- 1984: Audax Italiano
- 1986: Deportes Valdivia
- 1986: Magallanes
- 1986: Jorge Wilstermann
- 1987: Deportes La Serena
- 1987–1988: Cobreandino
- 1988: Quintero Unido
- 1989: Deportes Ovalle
- 1989–1990: Soinca Bata
- 1991: Cobreandino
- 1992–1993: Deportivo Flecha
- * Club domestic league appearances and goals

Jorge Arnaldo Venegas Vásquez (29 August 1939 – 7 September 2010) was a Chilean football manager and player who played as a forward.

== Career ==
As a football forward, Venegas played for Universidad de Chile, Audax Italiano and Coquimbo Unido in the Chilean Primera División.

At international level, he represented Chile U20 in the 1958 South American Championship alongside players such as José Sulantay, Efraín Santander, Alberto Fouillioux, among others.

Better known by his extensive managerial career in his homeland, he led Unión La Calera, O'Higgins, Magallanes and Audax Italiano in the top division.

Previously, he led the Chile national under-20 team in the 1971 South American Championship.

He led many clubs in the second level such as Coquimbo Unido, Malleco Unido, Rangers, Regional Antofagasta, Santiago Wanderers, Deportes Valdivia, among others.

Abroad, he had a stint with Bolivian club Jorge Wilstermann in 1986.

== Personal life ==
He was nicknamed Mosco (Fly).
