= Mario Moreno (footballer) =

Chilean footballer (1935-2005)

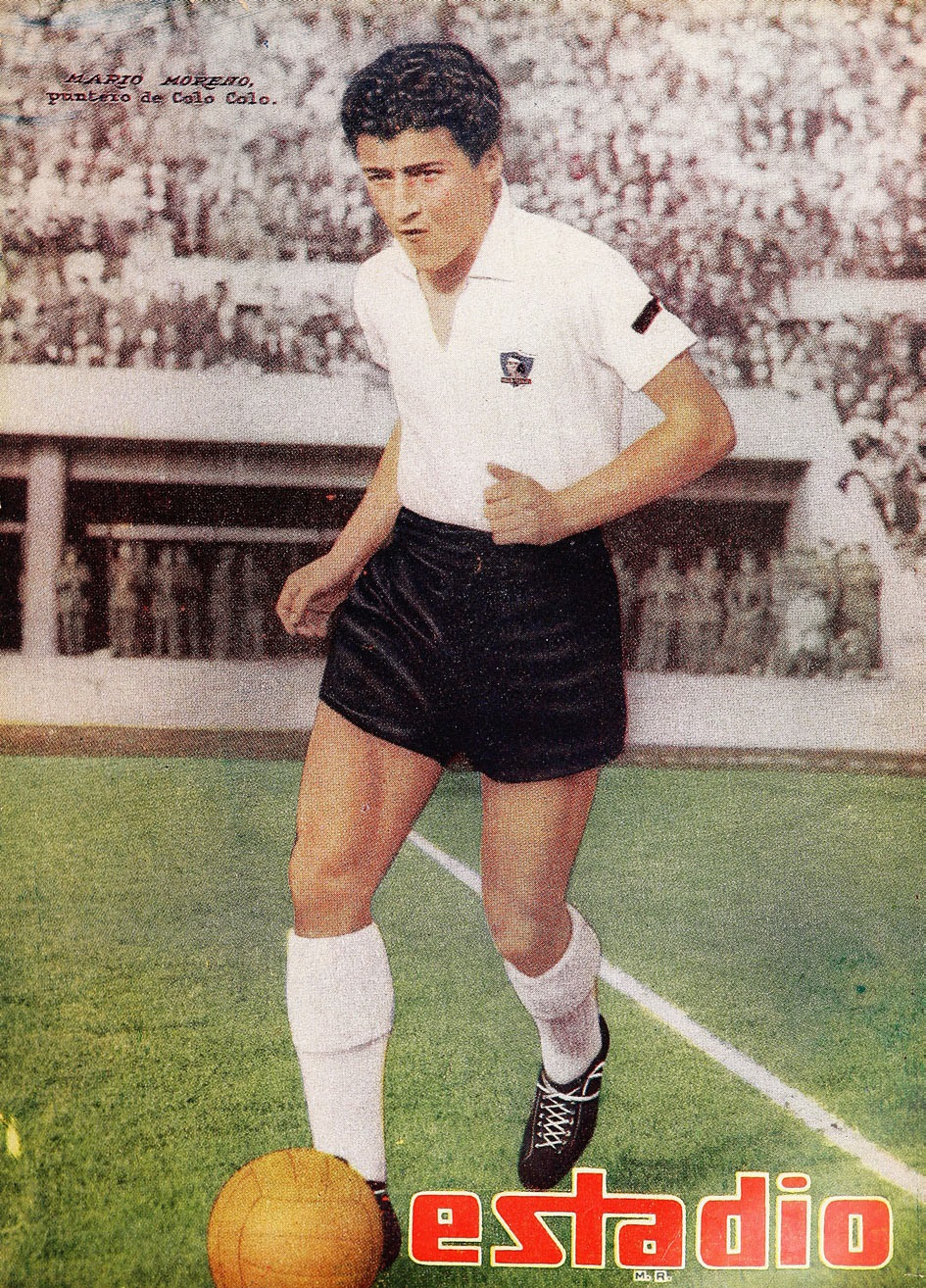

Personal information
- Full name: Mario Eduardo Moreno Burgos
- Date of birth: December 31, 1935
- Place of birth: Santiago, Chile
- Date of death: March 2, 2005 (aged 69)
- Place of death: Santiago, Chile
- Height: 1.74 m (5 ft 9 in)
- Position: Right winger

Senior career*
Years	Team	Apps	(Gls)
1955–1967	Colo-Colo		
1968–1970	Antofagasta Portuario		

International career
1959–1964	Chile	26	(3)

Managerial career
- 1988: Chile U16
Medal record
Men's football
Representing Chile
FIFA World Cup
Third place	1962 Chile
- * Club domestic league appearances and goals

Mario Eduardo Moreno Burgos (December 31, 1935 – March 2, 2005) was a Chilean footballer who played as a right winger for Chilean teams Colo-Colo and Antofagasta Portuario and represented the Chile national team at the 1962 FIFA World Cup.

== As coach ==
Moreno led Chile at under-16 level in the 1988 South American Championship.

== Legacy ==
Constituted on 10 February 1960, Moreno was a leadership member of the Unión de Jugadores Profesionales (Union of Professional Football Players) in Chile. On 6 April 1965, he was one of the constituent footballers of SIFUP, the trade union of professionales footballers in Chile, alongside fellows such as Efraín Santander, Francisco Valdés, Hugo Lepe, among others.

== Honours ==
Colo-Colo

- Primera Division: 1960, 1963, 1970
