= Mario Ortiz (Chilean footballer) =

Chilean footballer (1936-2006)

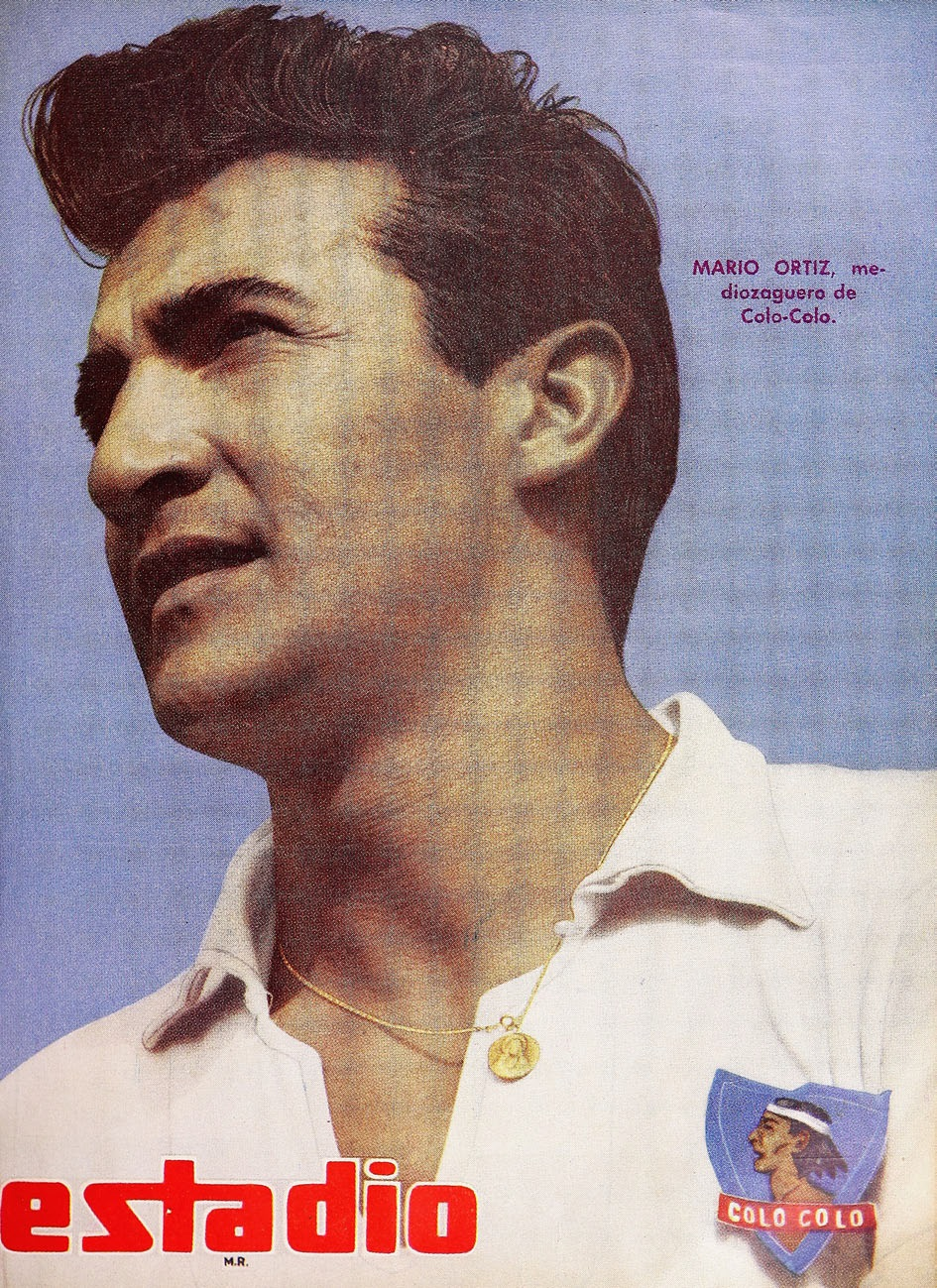

Personal information
- Full name: Mario Sergio Ortiz Vallejos
- Date of birth: January 28, 1936
- Place of birth: Santiago, Chile
- Date of death: May 2, 2006 (aged 70)
- Place of death: Santiago, Chile
- Position: Midfielder

Senior career*
Years	Team	Apps	(Gls)
1949–1953	Green Cross		
1954–1957	Palestino		
1958–1965	Colo-Colo		
1966	Luis Cruz Martínez		

International career
- Chile
Medal record
Men's football
Representing Chile
FIFA World Cup
Third place	1962 Chile
- * Club domestic league appearances and goals

Mario Sergio Ortiz Vallejos (28 January 1936 – 2 May 2006 in Santiago, Chile) was a Chilean footballer who played as a midfielder.

== Career ==
Ortiz played club football for Palestino and Colo-Colo, where he won league titles in 1960 and 1963.

He played for the Chile national football team in the 1962 FIFA World Cup, where he played as a midfielder, as Chile achieved a third-place finish.

== Personal life ==
On 6 April 1965, Ortiz was one of the constituent footballers of SIFUP, the trade union of professionales footballers in Chile, alongside fellows such as Efraín Santander, Francisco Valdés, Hugo Lepe, among others.

He died in 2006.
