= Luis Paz (Colombian footballer) =

Colombian footballer (1942–2015)

Personal information
- Full name: Luis Carlos Paz Moreno
- Date of birth: 25 June 1942
- Place of birth: Cali, Colombia
- Date of death: 27 June 2015 (aged 73)
- Place of death: Puracé, Cauca, Colombia

International career
Years	Team	Apps	(Gls)
1970	Colombia	1	(0)

Luis Carlos Paz Moreno (25 June 1942 – 27 June 2015) was a Colombian footballer. He competed for the Colombia national team at the 1962 FIFA World Cup which was held in Chile. He was 19 years old when he was called up for the squad, making him the youngest Colombian ever to be named to or play for at a World Cup. He died aged 73, of a heart attack, while vacationing with his family at a hotel resort in Puracé-Coconuco in the mountains in southern Colombia.
