= 1959 Copa Chile =

Tournament details
- Country: Chile

The 1959 Copa Chile was the second edition of the Chilean Cup tournament. The competition started on November 21, 1959, and concluded on December 22, 1959. Santiago Wanderers won the competition for the first time, beating Deportes La Serena on the final.

Matches were scheduled to be played at the stadium of the team named first on the date specified for each round. From the beginning of the second Round, if scores were level after 90 minutes had been played, an extra time took place.

== Calendar ==
Round	Date
First round	21 November 1959; 2 December 1959
Second round	5–6 December 1959
Quarterfinals	12 December 1959
Semifinals	19 December 1959
Finals	22 December 1959

== First round ==
Teams			Scores		Tie-breakers
Team #1	Agg.	Team #2	1st leg	2nd leg	Replay
Audax Italiano	8–3	San Bernardo Central	6–1	2–2	—
Magallanes	1–1	Fernández Vial	1–0	0–1	4—2
Colo-Colo	6–2	Selección Arica	6–0	0–2	—
Universidad de Chile	2–0	Ñublense	0–0	2–0	—
Universidad Católica	5–4	Deportivo San Fernando	3–2	2–2	—
Santiago Wanderers	6–5	Unión San Felipe	4–2	2–3	—
Unión La Calera	6–5	San Luis	2–3	4–2	—
O'Higgins	6–3	Universidad Técnica	3–2	3–1	—
Selección Cauquenes	1–6	Unión Española	1–3	0–3	—
Selección Calama	0–7	Deportes La Serena	0–1	0–6	—
Trasandino	4–2	Ferrobádminton	2–1	2–1	—
Thomas Bata	5–4	Green Cross	3–3	2–1	—
Selección Copiapó	2–5	Santiago Morning	2–4	0–1	—
Naval	2–5	Palestino	1–1	1–4	—
Rangers	5–3	Selección Pitrufquén	5–1	0–2	—
Coquimbo Unido	2–7	Everton	1–2	1–5	—

== Second round ==
Home team	Score	Away team
O'Higgins	3–0	Unión Española
Colo-Colo	4–0	Everton
Deportes La Serena	6–0	Thomas Bata
Santiago Wanderers	4–3	Unión La Calera
Rangers	3–3 (ct)	Magallanes
Palestino	2–2 (ct)	Trasandino
Universidad de Chile	3–1	Audax Italiano
Universidad Católica	3–1	Santiago Morning

== Quarterfinals ==
Home team	Score	Away team
Universidad de Chile	5–3	Magallanes
Colo-Colo	2–1	O'Higgins
Santiago Wanderers	2–1	Universidad Católica
Deportes La Serena	1–0	Trasandino

== Semifinals ==
December 19, 1959

Universidad de Chile	2 – 3	Deportes La Serena
Campos 23', 70'		7' López; 18' Pérez; 67' Aravena

Estadio Nacional, Santiago
Attendance: 15,685
Referee: D. Santos

December 19, 1959

Colo-Colo	0 – 4	Santiago Wanderers
		9' Bozzalla; 18', 70' Reynoso; 80' Tobar

Estadio Nacional, Santiago
Attendance: 15,685
Referee: C. Robles

== Third-place match ==
December 22, 1959

Colo-Colo	0 – 1	Universidad de Chile
		75' Ibarra

Estadio Nacional, Santiago
Attendance: 5,245
Referee: P. Zarkadis

== Finals ==
December 22, 1959

Santiago Wanderers	5 – 1	Deportes La Serena
R. Díaz 35', 41', 55'; Reynoso 49', 73'		28' (pen.) Farías

Estadio Nacional, Santiago
Attendance: 5,245
Referee: J. Silva

== Top goalscorers ==
- José Sulantay (Deportes La Serena) 6 goals
- Juan Soto (Colo-Colo) 6 goals
- Héctor Torres (Magallanes) 6 goals

== See also ==
- 1959 Campeonato Nacional
- Primera B
