= Francisco Sagredo =

Chilean journalist

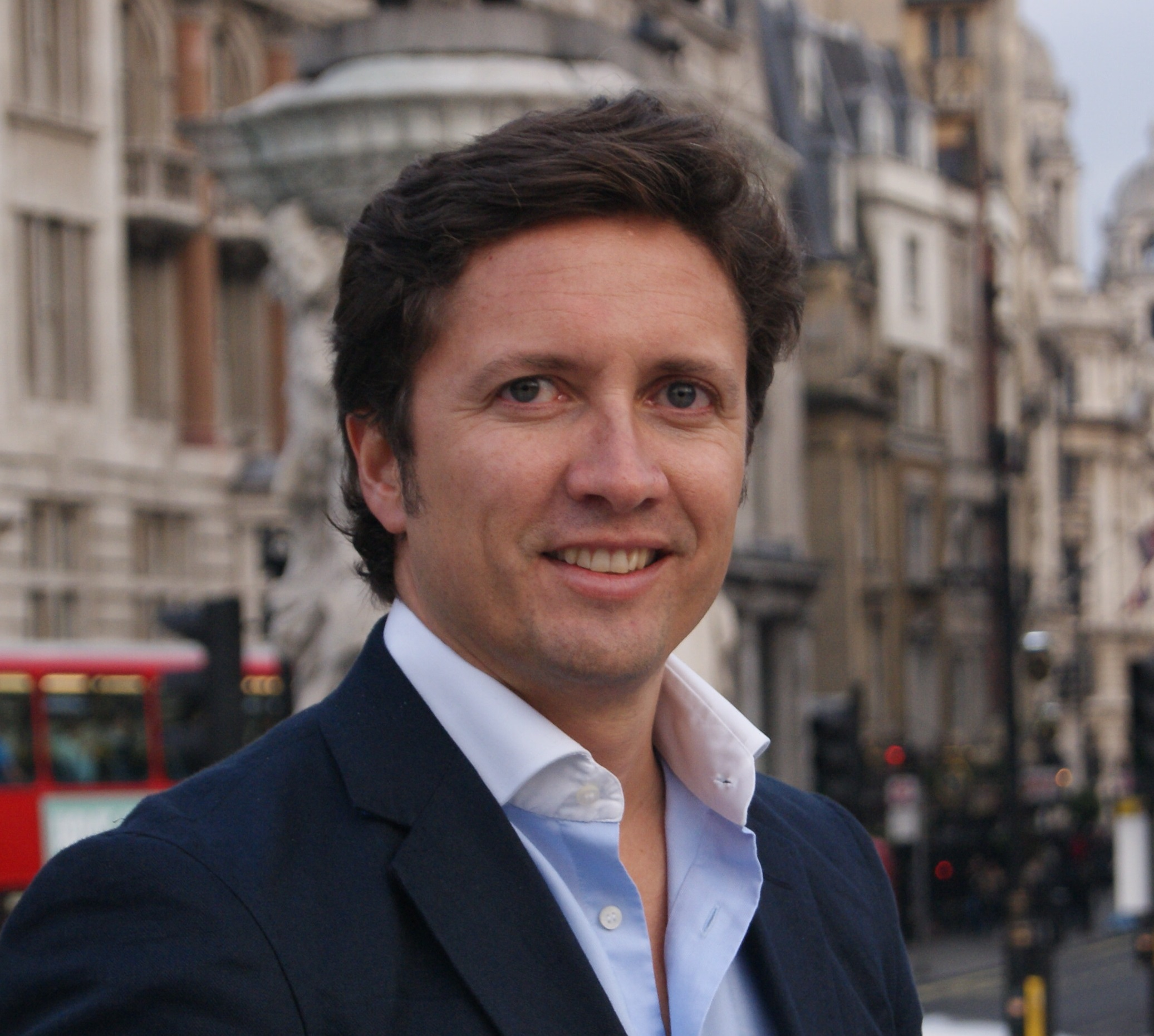

Personal details
- Born: 20 November 1975 (age 50) Santiago, Chile
- Spouse(s): Mónica Pérez (2008–present)
- Relatives: Rafael Sagredo
- Education: Scuola Italiana Vittorio Montiglio
- Alma mater: Diego Portales University (BA); Università Cattolica del Sacro Cuore (MA)
- Profession: Journalist

Francisco José Sagredo Baeza (born 20 November 1975) is a Chilean journalist whose main researches are about Chilean football and its political connections.

Since 2020, he has worked in the Chilean subsidiary of ESPN. Similarly, Sagredo also has worked in Radio Agricultura.

== Early life ==
Sagredo was born in 1975 and was the sixth and youngest son of the marriage made up of Christian democratic lawyer Rafael Sagredo Foncea and Gabriela Baeza Sosa. He is the brother of the historian Rafael Sagredo.

Sagredo attended elementary and high school education at the Scuola Italiana Vittorio Montiglio in Las Condes, an upper-middle-class commune in Santiago. Then, he completed his higher studies at the Diego Portales University (UDP) Faculty of Communications, where he was Vice President of the School of Journalism Students Center.

In 1999, Sagredo graduated as a journalist with a summa cum laude final score after defending his thesis on the media coverage of the murder of the centrist union leader Tucapel Jiménez (PR) (Note: 'PR' is the acronym of the Radical Party.) during Augusto Pinochet's military dictatorship. That score allowed him to obtain a scholarship from the UDP to study abroad, so he successfully applied for a master's degree in Italy, where he studied at the Università Cattolica del Sacro Cuore in Milan, completing there his MA.

== Works ==
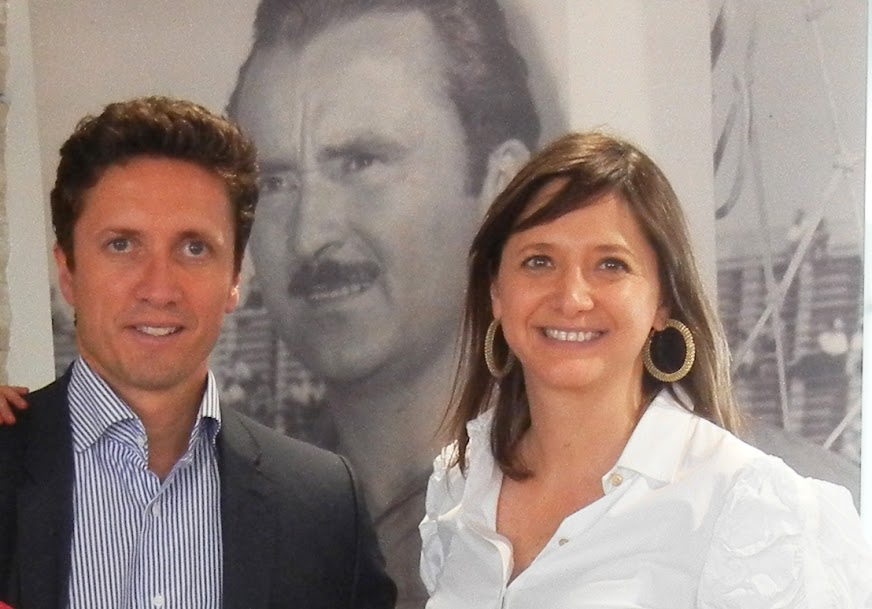
Francisco Sagredo alongside his wife Mónica Pérez.

=== Books ===
- La Caída (2011).
- Sergio Livingstone, su archivo personal (2013).
- El método Pellegrini (2015).
- Juego Sucio (2016) (co-edited with Fernando Tapia)
