= Rubén Soria =

Uruguayan footballer (1935–2020)

Ruben Soria
Personal information
- Full name: Ruben Néstor Soria
- Date of birth: 23 January 1935
- Place of birth: Uruguay
- Date of death: 2 February 2020 (aged 85)
- Place of death: Spain
- Position: Defender

Senior career*
Years	Team	Apps	(Gls)
- C.A. Cerro

International career
- Uruguay
- * Club domestic league appearances and goals

Ruben Néstor Soria (23 January 1935 – 2 February 2020) was a Uruguayan football defender who played for Uruguay in the 1962 FIFA World Cup. He also played for C.A. Cerro. Soria died in Spain on 2 February 2020, at the age of 85.
