= Sergo Kotrikadze =

Georgian footballer

Sergei Kotrikadze
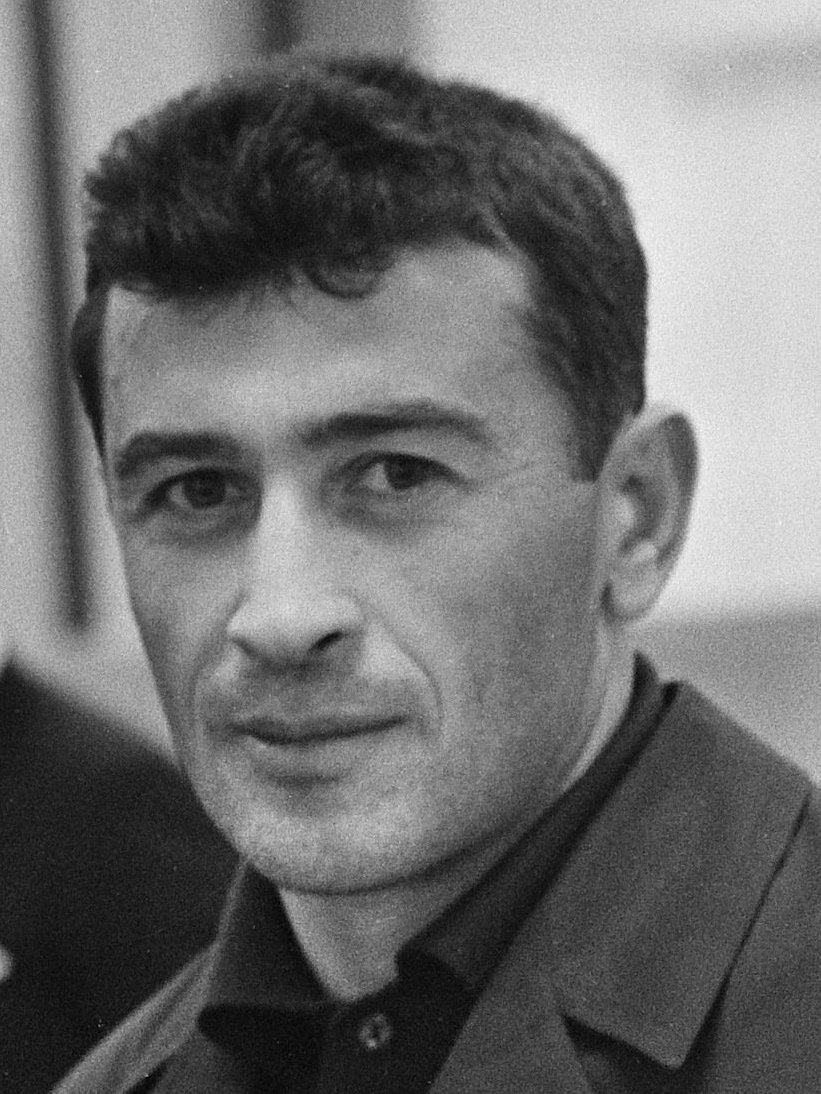

Personal information
- Full name: Sergo Parmenović Kotrikadze
- Date of birth: 9 August 1936
- Place of birth: Chokhatauri, Georgian SSR, USSR
- Date of death: 3 May 2011 (aged 74)
- Place of death: Stockholm, Sweden
- Height: 1.75 m (5 ft 9 in)
- Position: Goalkeeper

Senior career*
Years	Team	Apps	(Gls)
1955–1968	Dinamo Tbilisi	239	(0)
1968–1969	Torpedo Kutaisi	20	(0)
1970	Dinamo Tbilisi	2	(0)
Total		261	(0)

International career
1962	USSR	2	(0)

Managerial career
- 1973–1974: Dinamo Tbilisi (assistant)
- 1997–2001: WIT Georgia Tbilisi
- * Club domestic league appearances and goals

Sergo (Sergei) Parmenovich Kotrikadze (Georgian: სერგო კოტრიკაძე, Russian: Серге́й Парменович Котрикадзе) (9 August 1936 – 3 May 2011) was a Georgian association footballer from the former Soviet Union who played for FC Dinamo Tbilisi and FC Torpedo Kutaisi. He was part of the USSR's squad for the 1962 FIFA World Cup, but did not win any caps, although he played in two Olympic qualifiers.
