= Hernando Tovar =

Colombian footballer (1938–2026)

Personal information
- Full name: Hernando Tovar Brizneda
- Date of birth: 17 September 1938
- Place of birth: Colombia
- Date of death: 29 July 2026 (aged 87)
- Position: Defender

Senior career*
Years	Team	Apps	(Gls)
- Santa Fe

International career
- Colombia
- * Club domestic league appearances and goals

Hernando Tovar Brizneda (17 September 1938 – 29 July 2026) was a Colombian footballer who played as a defender. He was part of the squad for the Colombia national team at the 1962 FIFA World Cup which was held in Chile and played in one qualifying game for the 1966 tournament.

== Career ==
Tovar played club football with Santa Fe, where he won two Colombian league titles.

== Death ==
Tovar died on 29 July 2026, at the age of 87.
