= Antonio Permunian =

Swiss footballer (1930–2020)

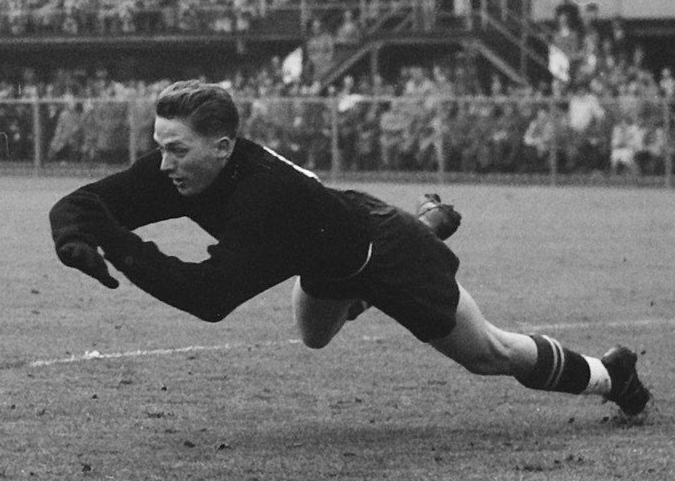
- Antonio Permunian (1955)

Personal information
- Date of birth: 15 August 1930
- Place of birth: Bellinzona, Switzerland
- Date of death: 5 March 2020 (aged 89)
- Place of death: Bellinzona
- Position: Goalkeeper

Senior career*
Years	Team	Apps	(Gls)
1948–1960	AC Bellinzona		
1960–1966	FC Luzern		
1966–1968	AC Bellinzona		

International career
1955–1962	Switzerland	11	(0)
- * Club domestic league appearances and goals

Antonio Permunian (15 August 1930 – 5 March 2020) was a Swiss football goalkeeper who played for Switzerland in the 1962 FIFA World Cup.

Permunian played his youth football with his local team AC Bellinzona and started his active football career in their first team in 1948. In that year Bellinzona won the Swiss Football League Championship. He transferred to FC Luzern in 1960 and played there for six years. He returned to Bellinzona to end his active career.

He recalled the international game Switzerland against Hungary on 17 September 1955 in the Stade Olympique de la Pontaise with 45,000 spectators as the "match of his life". The Swiss team lost the game 4 - 5, but Permunian remembered Puskás, Kocsis and Hidegkuti running non-stop towards his goal. He played all games bare handed, but soon after this game he bought his first pair of goalie-gloves and was the first goalkeeper in Switzerland to play with gloves. Permunian lived in Bellinzona.

== Honours ==
Bellinzona

- Swiss Football League Champion: 1948
