= Ivan Ivanov (footballer, born 1942) =

Bulgarian footballer

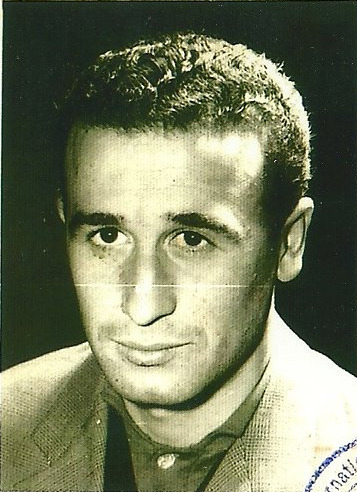
- Ivan Ivanov in 1962

Personal information
- Full name: Ivan Vasilev Ivanov
- Date of birth: 31 March 1942
- Place of birth: Pernik, Bulgaria
- Date of death: 28 May 2006 (aged 64)
- Place of death: Varna, Bulgaria
- Position: Goalkeeper

Senior career*
Years	Team	Apps	(Gls)
1959–1961	Minyor Pernik	35	(0)
1961–1963	Cherno More	56	(0)
1963–1964	Minyor Pernik	38	(0)
1965–1970	Cherno More	70	(0)
Total		200	(0)

International career
1962–1963	Bulgaria	1	(0)
- * Club domestic league appearances and goals

Ivan Vasilev Ivanov (Bulgarian: Иван Василев Иванов; 31 March 1942 – 28 May 2006) was a Bulgarian football goalkeeper who played for Bulgaria in the 1962 FIFA World Cup. He also played for Cherno More Varna.
