= Antonio Mota =

Mexican footballer (1939–1986)

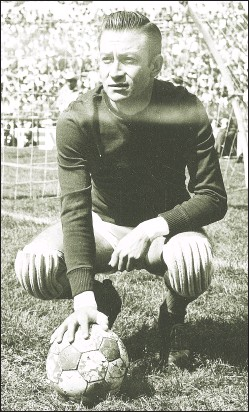

Personal information
- Full name: Antonio José Mota Romero
- Date of birth: January 26, 1939
- Place of birth: Mexico City, Mexico
- Date of death: September 13, 1986 (aged 47)
- Position: Goalkeeper

Senior career*
Years	Team	Apps	(Gls)
1959–1964	CD Oro		
1964–1971	Necaxa		

International career
1961–1970	Mexico	15	(0)
- * Club domestic league appearances and goals

Antonio José Mota Romero (January 26, 1939 – September 13, 1986) was a Mexican professional football goalkeeper, who played for the Mexico national team between 1961 and 1970. He was part of the Mexico squad for FIFA World Cup tournaments: 1962 and 1970.

At club level, Mota played for CD Oro and Necaxa.
