= Ignacio Pérez =

Colombian footballer (1934-2009)

Personal information
- Full name: Ignacio Pérez Sierra
- Date of birth: December 19, 1934
- Place of birth: Colombia
- Date of death: November 16, 2009 (aged 74)

International career
| Years | Team | Apps | (Gls) |
- Colombia

Ignacio Pérez Sierra (19 December 1934 – 16 November 2009) was a Colombian footballer. He was a member of the Colombia national football team at the 1962 FIFA World Cup which was held in Chile.

== Career ==
Born in Medellín, Pérez played club football for Once Caldas, Independiente Medellín, Unión Magdalena, Santa Fe and Deportivo Pereira.

== Personal ==
In November 2009, Pérez died from a heart attack in Medellín.
