= Scuola Italiana Vittorio Montiglio =

Italian international school

Coordinates: 33.39718°S 70.50528°W

- The School in 2024

Location
- Avenida Las Flores 12707; Las Condes; Santiago, Santiago Province, 7550000; Chile

Information
- Established: 1891; 135 years ago
- Website: www.scuola.cl/sivm/

Scuola Italiana Vittorio Montiglio or Scuola Italiana Santiago is an Italian international school founded in 1891. Located at Las Condes, Santiago Province, Chile. It has scuola infanzia (preschool) through scuola secondaria di II grado (upper secondary school).

The current campus has 52 classrooms, two tennis courts, three football fields, two swimming pools, two bocce fields, and four multipurpose fields. The campus officially opened on 24 March 2009 and encompasses a total of 27,000 square metres (290,000 sq ft) of built space.
