= Efraín Santander =

Chilean footballer (born 1941)

Personal information
- Full name: Segundo Efraín Santander Cancino
- Date of birth: 7 December 1941
- Place of birth: Los Andes, Chile
- Date of death: 5 April 2026 (aged 84)
- Place of death: Guatemala City, Guatemala
- Position: Goalkeeper

Youth career
- 1957: Unión San Felipe
- Colo-Colo

Senior career*
Years	Team	Apps	(Gls)
1958–1970	Colo-Colo		
1961	→ Deportes La Serena (loan)		
1972	Excélsior		
1972–1973	Municipal		
1973–1974	Juventud Católica		
1974	Municipal		

International career
1958–1960	Chile U20		
1968	Chile	1	(0)
- * Club domestic league appearances and goals

Segundo Efraín Santander Cancino (7 December 1941 – 5 April 2026), known as Efraín Santander, was a Chilean professional footballer who played as a goalkeeper for clubs in Chile and Guatemala.

== Club career ==
Santander came to Colo-Colo youth system from La Calera. At senior level, he won two national league titles in 1969 and 1970, becoming one of the few goalkeepers from the youth system who have won any league. In addition, he won the friendly 1969 Torneo Internacional de Chile, where competed Dynamo Moscow, Corinthians, among other clubs. In Chile, he also had a brief step on loan at Deportes La Serena in 1961.

In 1972, he moved to Guatemala and joined Municipal. After a step with Juventud Católica, he returned to Municipal and won the 1974 Liga Nacional de Guatemala.

== International career ==
Since he was 16 years old, he was a Chile youth international footballer. He represented Chile U20 in the 1958 South American Championship alongside players such as José Sulantay, Jorge Venegas, Alberto Fouillioux, among others. In 1960 he took part of the Chile U20 squad with Hernán Carrasco as coach.

At senior level, he made an appearance for the Chile national team in the match against Peru on 21 August 1968.

== Personal life and death ==
Santander was nicknamed El Negro (The Black One).

On 6 April 1965, Santander was one of the constituent footballers of SIFUP, the trade union of professionales footballers in Chile, alongside fellows such as Misael Escuti, Francisco Valdés, Hugo Lepe, among others.

Santander died on 5 April 2026 in Guatemala City.

== Honours ==
Colo-Colo

- Chilean Primera División: 1963, 1970
- Torneo Internacional de Chile: 1969

Municipal

- Liga Nacional de Fútbol de Guatemala: 1974

Chile

- Copa del Pacífico: 1968
