= Alberto Mariotti =

Argentine footballer

Personal information
- Full name: Alberto Jorge Mariotti
- Date of birth: 23 August 1935 (age 91)
- Place of birth: Argentina
- Position: Defender

Senior career*
Years	Team	Apps	(Gls)
- Chacarita Juniors
- San Lorenzo
- Argentinos Juniors

International career
- Argentina
- * Club domestic league appearances and goals

Alberto Jorge Mariotti (born 23 August 1935) is a former Argentine association football player.

Mariotti plied his trade with Argentine clubs Chacarita Juniors (with whom he won the Primera B in 1959), San Lorenzo and Argentinos Juniors. In total, he played a total of 131 matches in the Argentine league, without scoring a single goal.

While at San Lorenzo, Páez was called up to the Argentina squad for the 1962 FIFA World Cup in Chile, where they were eliminated in the group stage. However, he was an unused substitute at the tournament and did not appear in any matches.
