= Pedro Romero (footballer) =

Mexican footballer (1937–2018)

Personal information
- Full name: Pedro Romero Precord
- Date of birth: 12 August 1937
- Place of birth: Mexico
- Date of death: 12 March 2018 (aged 80)
- Position: Midfielder

Senior career*
Years	Team	Apps	(Gls)
- Deportivo Toluca

International career
- Mexico
- * Club domestic league appearances and goals

Pedro Romero Precord (12 August 1937 – 12 March 2018) was a Mexican football midfielder who played for Mexico in the 1962 FIFA World Cup. He also played for Deportivo Toluca. Romero died on 12 March 2018, at the age of 80.
