= José Sulantay =

Chilean footballer and manager (1940–2023)

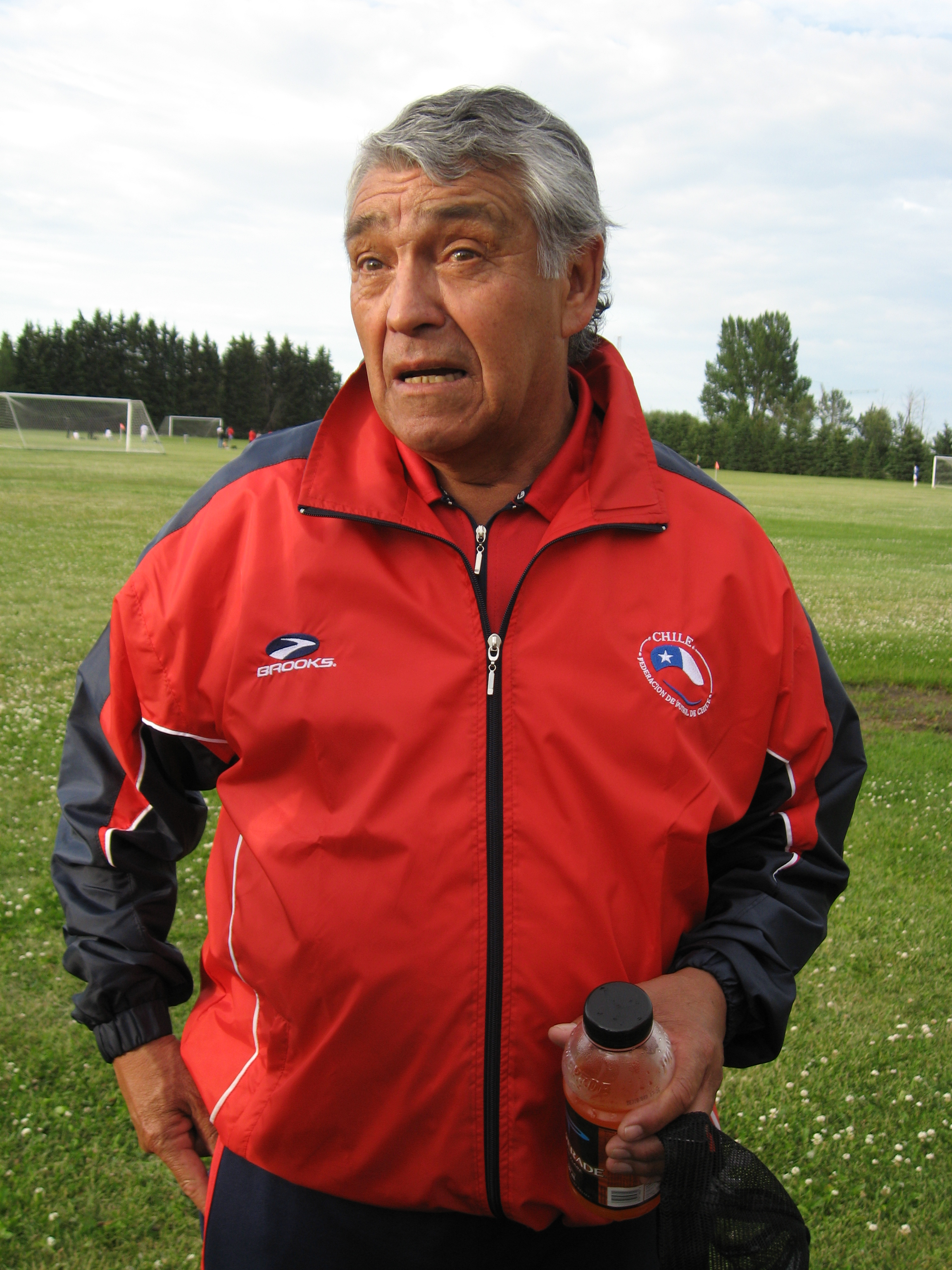
- Sulantay as manager of Chile U20 in 2007

Personal details
- Born: José Manuel Sulantay Silva; 3 April 1940 Coquimbo, Chile
- Died: 20 July 2023 (aged 83) Coquimbo, Chile
- Party: Close to Unión Demócrata Independiente (2012)
- Children: Marco Sulantay
Association football career
- Height: 1.70 m (5 ft 7 in)
- Positions: Right-back; right winger
Youth career
- Atlético El Llano
- Deportes La Serena
Senior career*
Years	Team	Apps	(Gls)
1957–1965	Deportes La Serena		
1962–1963	→ O'Higgins (loan)	53	(15)
1966	Palestino	20	(7)
1966–1967	UES		
1968	Atlético Marte		
1969	Atlético Cobán		
1970	Aurora FC		
1971	Antofagasta Portuario	6	(0)
1972–1973	Coquimbo Unido		
International career
1958	Chile U20		
Managerial career
- 1976–1978: Coquimbo Unido
- 1979: Deportes La Serena
- 1980–1983: Coquimbo Unido
- 1984: Deportes La Serena
- 1985: Coquimbo Unido
- 1987–1988: Deportes La Serena
- 1988: Deportes Antofagasta
- 1989: Deportes La Serena
- 1989: Deportes Ovalle
- 1990–1992: Coquimbo Unido
- 1992–1993: Cobreloa
- 1994: Palestino
- 1994: Coquimbo Unido
- 1995: Deportes La Serena
- 1997: O'Higgins
- 1997: Deportes Antofagasta
- 1998: Coquimbo Unido
- 1999: Rangers
- 2001–2003: Coquimbo Unido
- 2003–2004: Chile U23
- 2005: Chile U15
- 2005–2007: Chile U17
- 2006–2007: Chile U20
- 2008: Deportes Iquique
- 2010: Coquimbo Unido
- 2017: Cobreloa
Medal record
Men's football
Representing Chile (as manager)
FIFA U-20 World Cup
Bronze medal – third place	2007
- * Club domestic league appearances and goals

José Manuel Sulantay Silva (3 April 1940 – 20 July 2023) was a Chilean football player and manager. He notably managed the Chile U20 and Chile U17 national team, leading the Chile U20 to a third-place finish at the 2007 FIFA U-20 World Cup in Canada. At a FIFA level, Sulantay is Chile's second most successful coach after Fernando Riera.

== Playing career ==
Sulantay was born in Coquimbo, Chile. As a youth player, he was with Atlético El Llano from his hometown. At professional level, he officially debuted with Deportes La Serena in 1957. There, he highlighted as right back or right wing. This allowed him being called to Chilean national U-20 team that participated in the 1958 South American Championship held in his country.

After losing with Serena the 1959 Copa Chile final against Santiago Wanderers, in 1960 he achieved with the team that season's Copa Chile edition. Equally, in 1959 he was the cup's top scorer with six goals alongside Juan Soto ―from Colo-Colo― and Héctor Torres from Magallanes.

== Managerial career ==
=== Early seasons: 1976–1989 ===
After being promoted to Coquimbo Unido's first adult team by Enrique Hormazábal (nicknamed «Cuá-cuá»), he was the manager of both Coquimbo Unido and Deportes La Serena for twelve years.

=== Cobreloa ===
In 1992, he achieved a Primera División de Chile title with the club.

=== Chile youth teams: 2003–2007 ===
During 2007 FIFA Youth World Cup, on 20 June, his team was involved in a clash with the Canadian police after the players tried to cross security barriers to meet with fans, conflict that even extended to Harold Mayne-Nicholls —president of the ANFP— who was beaten by Toronto's police. These events even transcended beyond football by provoking complaints from the President Michelle Bachelet, the Chilean consul in Toronto and Human Rights Watch director José Miguel Vivanco. Days later also FIFA president Joseph Blatter condemned the violence from Canadian police.

After Chile U20's performance in 2007 FIFA Youth World Cup, he was the candidate to replace Nelson Acosta in the adult national team. Nevertheless, on 30 July, he officially declined. Likewise, according to journalist Francisco Sagredo, this option didn't prosper because Sulantay would have broken the confidentiality pact by telling this possibility to media.

=== Municipal Iquique ===
On 5 January 2008, he joined Primera B side Municipal Iquique.

On 11 September 2008, he renounced to Iquique's bench.

=== Return to Coquimbo ===
In early 2010, it was reported that he rejoined Coquimbo Unido.

=== Return to Cobreloa ===
On 20 January 2017, he was appointed new coach of Cobreloa.

== Coaching style ==
According to him:

"I am a follower of Rinus Michels".

== Political career ==
In 2012, he competed to be mayor of Coquimbo as an independent with support from conservative party Independent Democratic Union («UDI»). However, he lost the elections against Cristian Galleguillos from Christian Democratic Party, who obtained a 45,6% instead Sulantay's 27,5% (he finished second in the election).

== Personal life ==
Sulantay had five children – José Carlo, Marcelo, Paula, Marco Antonio and Carolina – along with his wife, Marcia Olivares. Marco Antonio is a journalist and politician who has served as Director of IND (National Sports Institute), CORE (Regional Minister) and Deputy.

Sulantay was honored as Illustrious Son of Coquimbo in 2007.

== Death ==
José Sulantay died from a stroke in Coquimbo, on 20 July 2023, at the age of 83.

== Honors ==
=== Player ===
Deportes La Serena

- Segunda División de Chile: 1957
- Copa Preparación: 1960

Individual

- Copa Chile top scorer: 1959

=== Manager ===
Deportes La Serena

- Segunda División de Chile: 1987

Cobreloa

- Primera División de Chile: 1992

Chile U20

- FIFA U-20 World Cup third place: 2007

== Source ==
- Sagredo, Francisco (2011). La Caída: La historia secreta del autogol político y empresarial de Mayne-Nicholls, Bielsa y el fútbol chileno. Editorial Aguilar.
