= Puracé, Cauca =

Coordinates: 2°15′N 76°25′W

- Municipality and town
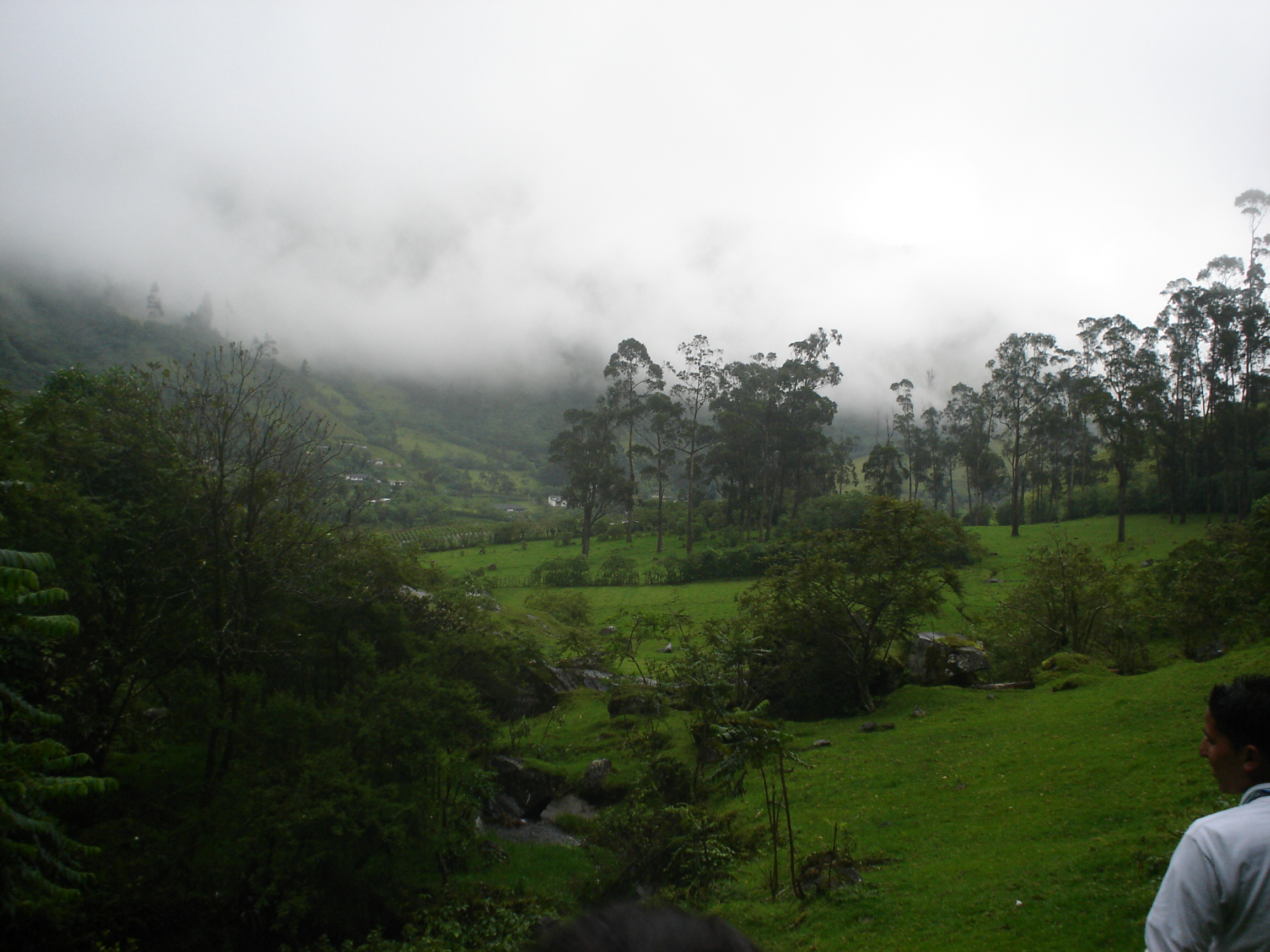
- View of the nearby national park

- Flag

- Location of the municipality and town of Puracé in the Cauca Department of Colombia.
- Country: Colombia
- Department: Cauca Department

Area
  - Total: 783 km^{2} (302 sq mi)

Population (Census 2018)
  - Total: 14,952
  - Density: 19.1/km^{2} (49.5/sq mi)
- Time zone: UTC-5 (Colombia Standard Time)
- Climate: Cfb
- Website: http://www.purace-cauca.gov.co/

Puracé (Spanish pronunciation: [puɾaˈse]) is a town and municipality in the Cauca Department, Colombia.

An 1853 watercolor by Manuel María Paz is an early depiction of four indigenous people in Puracé wearing straw hats and ruanas.

== Climate ==
Climate data for Puracé (Paletara), elevation 2,900 m (9,500 ft), (1981–2010)
Month	Jan	Feb	Mar	Apr	May	Jun	Jul	Aug	Sep	Oct	Nov	Dec	Year
Mean daily maximum °C (°F)	16.1 (61.0)	15.7 (60.3)	15.4 (59.7)	15.4 (59.7)	15.5 (59.9)	14.9 (58.8)	13.6 (56.5)	14.6 (58.3)	15.2 (59.4)	16.1 (61.0)	15.8 (60.4)	15.5 (59.9)	15.3 (59.5)
Daily mean °C (°F)	11.4 (52.5)	11.5 (52.7)	11.4 (52.5)	11.6 (52.9)	11.7 (53.1)	11.2 (52.2)	10.5 (50.9)	10.6 (51.1)	11.3 (52.3)	11.5 (52.7)	11.7 (53.1)	11.5 (52.7)	11.3 (52.3)
Mean daily minimum °C (°F)	5.8 (42.4)	5.8 (42.4)	6.2 (43.2)	6.3 (43.3)	6.6 (43.9)	6.6 (43.9)	6.1 (43.0)	6.2 (43.2)	6.2 (43.2)	6.3 (43.3)	6.1 (43.0)	5.7 (42.3)	6.2 (43.2)
Average precipitation mm (inches)	72.3 (2.85)	76.8 (3.02)	81.9 (3.22)	112.7 (4.44)	110.1 (4.33)	110.6 (4.35)	146.9 (5.78)	98.8 (3.89)	71.5 (2.81)	95.5 (3.76)	99.9 (3.93)	85.3 (3.36)	1,141.8 (44.95)
Average precipitation days	15	16	19	22	24	24	26	23	21	20	20	16	242
Average relative humidity (%)	88	87	88	88	88	88	88	89	87	87	87	87	88
Mean monthly sunshine hours	120.9	93.2	77.5	69.0	74.4	66.0	62.0	74.4	72.0	77.5	90.0	114.7	991.6
Mean daily sunshine hours	3.9	3.3	2.5	2.3	2.4	2.2	2.0	2.4	2.4	2.5	3.0	3.7	2.7
Source: Instituto de Hidrologia Meteorologia y Estudios Ambientales

Climate data for Puracé (Sta Leticia), elevation 2,085 m (6,841 ft), (1981–2010)
Month	Jan	Feb	Mar	Apr	May	Jun	Jul	Aug	Sep	Oct	Nov	Dec	Year
Mean daily maximum °C (°F)	20.2 (68.4)	20.1 (68.2)	19.8 (67.6)	19.9 (67.8)	19.5 (67.1)	19.2 (66.6)	18.7 (65.7)	18.8 (65.8)	19.5 (67.1)	19.7 (67.5)	19.7 (67.5)	19.9 (67.8)	19.6 (67.3)
Daily mean °C (°F)	16.1 (61.0)	16.2 (61.2)	16.0 (60.8)	16.1 (61.0)	16.0 (60.8)	15.7 (60.3)	15.3 (59.5)	15.4 (59.7)	15.7 (60.3)	15.9 (60.6)	15.9 (60.6)	16.0 (60.8)	15.9 (60.6)
Mean daily minimum °C (°F)	11.6 (52.9)	11.8 (53.2)	11.9 (53.4)	12.1 (53.8)	12.0 (53.6)	11.7 (53.1)	11.3 (52.3)	11.3 (52.3)	11.3 (52.3)	11.5 (52.7)	11.7 (53.1)	11.7 (53.1)	11.7 (53.1)
Average precipitation mm (inches)	94.2 (3.71)	126.9 (5.00)	165.8 (6.53)	218.3 (8.59)	199.7 (7.86)	175.5 (6.91)	148.0 (5.83)	114.3 (4.50)	117.9 (4.64)	168.9 (6.65)	146.0 (5.75)	111.2 (4.38)	1,763.9 (69.44)
Average precipitation days	18	18	23	25	26	25	25	22	21	24	22	20	264
Average relative humidity (%)	81	81	82	82	82	83	83	82	81	82	82	82	82
Mean monthly sunshine hours	127.1	101.6	83.7	75.0	80.6	78.0	74.4	83.7	90.0	96.1	99.0	120.9	1,110.1
Mean daily sunshine hours	4.1	3.6	2.7	2.5	2.6	2.6	2.4	2.7	3.0	3.1	3.3	3.9	3.0
Source: Instituto de Hidrologia Meteorologia y Estudios Ambientales
