= Misael Escuti =

Chilean footballer (1926-2005)

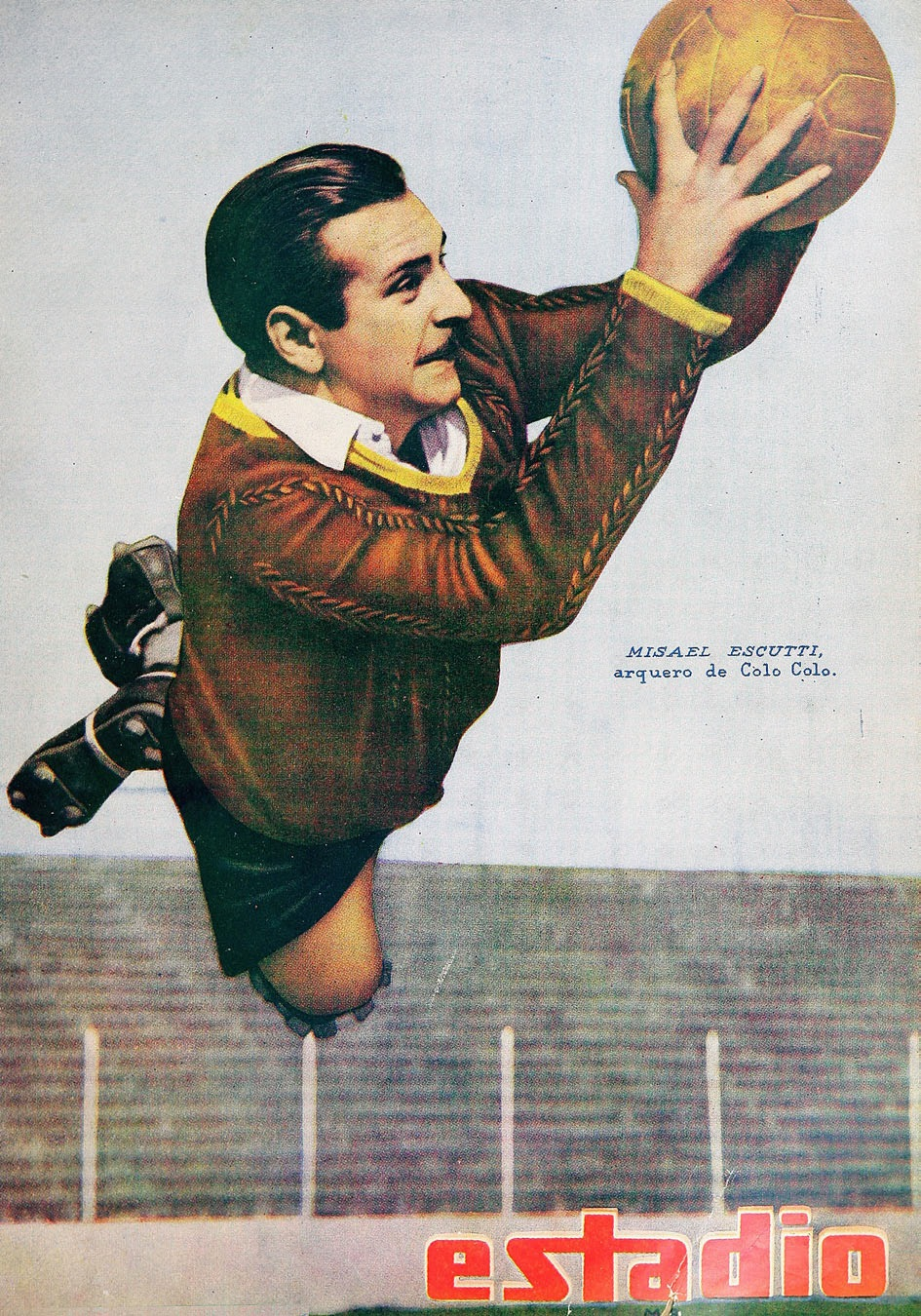

Personal information
- Full name: Misael Escuti Rovira
- Date of birth: 20 December 1926
- Place of birth: Copiapó, Chile
- Date of death: 3 January 2005 (aged 78)
- Place of death: Santiago, Chile
- Height: 1.78 m (5 ft 10 in)
- Position: Goalkeeper

Youth career
- Washington Berner
- 1944–1945: Santiago National

Senior career*
Years	Team	Apps	(Gls)
1945	Badminton	3	(0)
1946–1964	Colo-Colo	417	(0)
Total		420	(0)

International career
1948–1962	Chile	40	(0)
Medal record
Men's football
Representing Chile
FIFA World Cup
Third place	1962 Chile
- * Club domestic league appearances and goals

Misael Escuti Rovira (20 December 1926 – 3 January 2005) was a Chilean footballer of Italian ancestry, who played as a goalkeeper. He is remembered for being the key player with the Chile national team that reached third place in the 1962 FIFA World Cup tournament.

== Career ==
Born in Copiapó, Chile, Escuti started playing football with local team Washington Berner. Still a youth player, Escuti continued in Santiago with a team based in Barrio Brasil before joining Santiago National. Later, he made his professional debut with Badminton.

Constituted on 23 November 1956, Escuti was a leadership member of the Sindicato Profesional de Jugadores de Fútbol (Professional Trade Union of Football Players) in Chile. On 6 April 1965, Escuti was one of the constituent footballers of SIFUP, the trade union of professionales footballers in Chile, alongside fellows such as Efraín Santander, Francisco Valdés, Hugo Lepe, among others.
