= Federico Sacchi =

Argentine footballer (1936–2023)

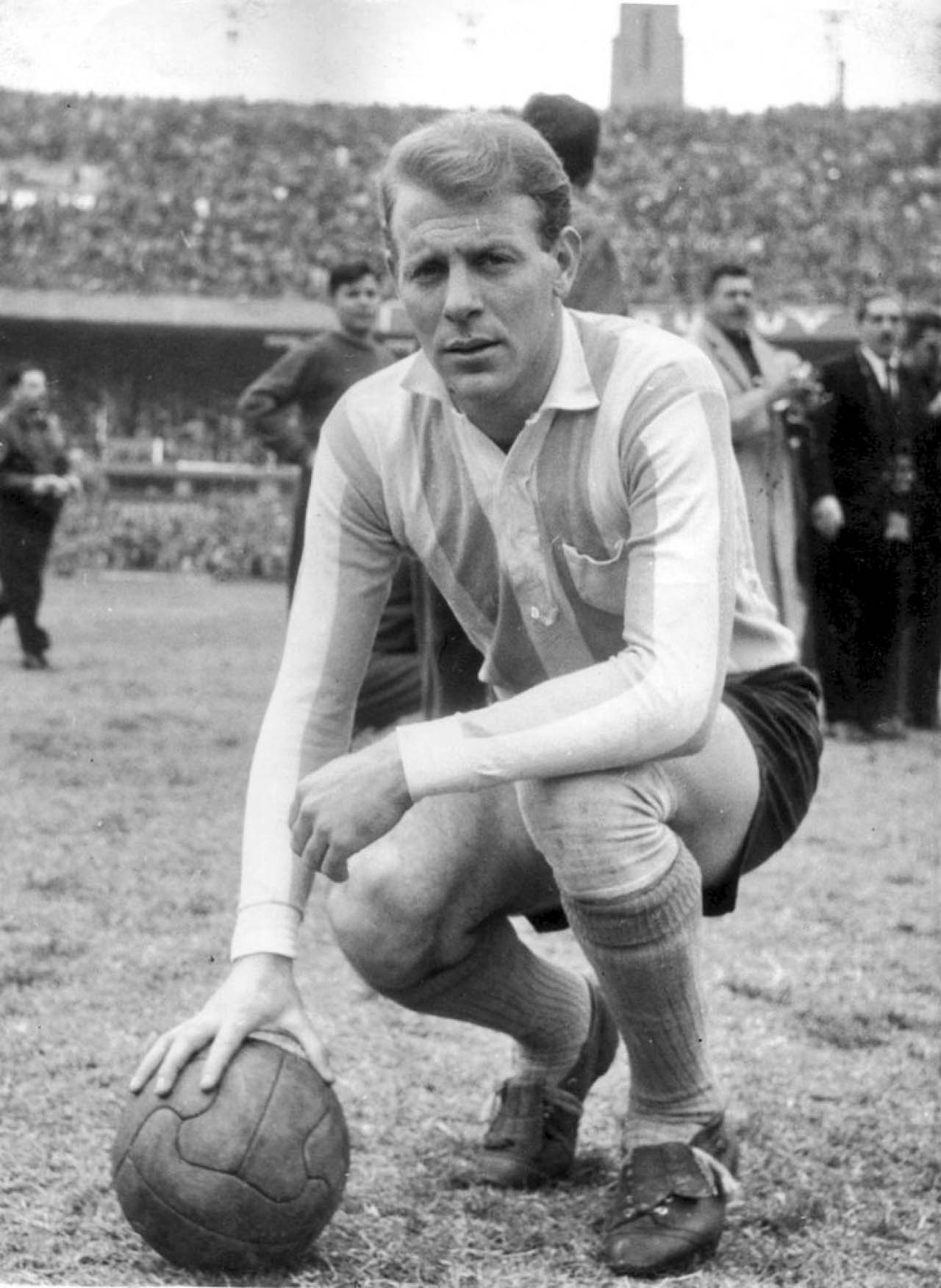
- Sacchi with Racing Club in the 1960s

Personal information
- Full name: Federico Jorge Sacchi
- Date of birth: 4 September 1936
- Place of birth: Rosario, Santa Fe, Argentina
- Date of death: 7 November 2023 (aged 87)
- Height: 1.82 m (6 ft 0 in)
- Position: Central defender

Youth career
- Tiro Federal

Senior career*
Years	Team	Apps	(Gls)
1958–1960	Newell's Old Boys	60	(7)
1961–1964	Racing Club	88	(12)
1965–1966	Boca Juniors	24	(1)
1967	Sporting Cristal		

International career
1960–1965	Argentina	15	(1)

Managerial career
- 1977–1978: Villa Dálmine
- 1984: Tigre
- 1985-1986: Colón de Santa Fe
- * Club domestic league appearances and goals

Federico Jorge Sacchi (4 September 1936 – 7 November 2023) was an Argentine footballer who played as a central defender. He made 15 appearances for the Argentina national team between 1960 and 1965. He is included in the Argentine Football Association Hall of Fame.

== Club career ==
Sacchi started his career with Tiro Federal. In 1958, he was signed by Newell's Old Boys. Sacchi joined Racing Club de Avellaneda in 1961 and was part of the team that won the Argentine Primera in his first season with the club. He joined Boca Juniors in 1965 and won another league title in his debut season with the club. In 1967, he joined Sporting Cristal of Peru.

== International career ==
Sacchi played 15 times for the Argentina national team, scoring one goal. He was a member of the Argentina squad for the 1962 World Cup.

== Coaching career ==
After retiring as a player, Sacchi became a football coach; he worked as an assistant to César Luis Menotti and managed several lower-league teams in his own right, including Tigre and San Martín de Tucumán. He also worked as a youth team coach at Racing Club and Atlético de Rafaela.

== Death ==
Federico Sacchi died on 7 November 2023, at the age of 87.

== Honours ==
Racing Club

- Primera División Argentina: 1961

Boca Juniors

- Primera División Argentina: 1965
