= Dimitar Kostov =

Bulgarian footballer

Personal information
- Full name: Dimitar Ivanov Kostov
- Date of birth: 27 July 1936 (age 90)
- Place of birth: Bulgaria
- Position: Defender

Senior career*
Years	Team	Apps	(Gls)
- Slavia Sofia

International career
- Bulgaria
- * Club domestic league appearances and goals

Dimitar Ivanov Kostov (Bulgarian: Димитьр Иванов Костов; born 27 July 1936) is a Bulgarian football defender who played for Bulgaria in the 1962 FIFA World Cup. He also played for Slavia Sofia.
