= Raúl Páez =

Argentine footballer (1937–1996)

Personal information
- Full name: Raúl Alberto Páez
- Date of birth: 26 May 1937
- Place of birth: Córdoba, Argentina
- Date of death: 29 May 1996
- Place of death: Brazil
- Height: 1.76 m (5 ft 9 in)
- Position: Defender

Senior career*
Years	Team	Apps	(Gls)
1958–1967	San Lorenzo	214	(3)
1968	Quilmes	7	(0)

International career
1962	Argentina	3	(0)
- * Club domestic league appearances and goals

Raúl Alberto Páez (26 May 1937 – 29 May 1996) was an Argentine association football player.

Páez began his career in 1958 at San Lorenzo de Almagro in Buenos Aires. With San Lorenzo he won the 1959 Argentine Primera División and took part in the 1960 Copa Libertadores where they reached the semi-finals before getting knocked out by Uruguayan side C.A. Peñarol.

While at San Lorenzo Páez was called up to the Argentina squad for the 1962 FIFA World Cup in Chile, where they were eliminated in the group stage. Páez appeared in matches against England and Bulgaria.

Páez stayed with San Lorenzo until 1967 before moving to Quilmes Atlético Club where he retired after the 1968 season. In total he played 222 matches in the Argentine league and scored 3 goals.

Raúl Páez died in Brazil on 29 May 1996.
