= Marcelo Pagani =

Argentine footballer

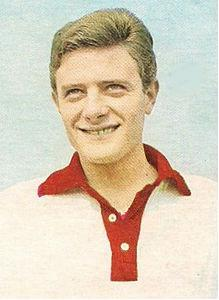

Personal information
- Full name: Marcelo Ernesto Pagani
- Date of birth: August 19, 1941 (age 85)
- Place of birth: Argentina

Senior career*
Years	Team	Apps	(Gls)
1959–1961	Rosario Central	67	(23)
1962	River Plate	70	(23)
1962-1963	Inter Milan		
1963-1964	Messina		
1964-1965	Mantova 1911		
1966-1967	Rosario Central	(total)	((total))

International career
1961–1962	Argentina	5	(2)
- * Club domestic league appearances and goals

Marcelo Ernesto Pagani (born August 19, 1941, in Santa Fe, Argentina) is a former Argentine footballer who played for clubs of Argentina, Chile and Italy and the Argentina national football team in the FIFA World Cup Chile 1962.

== Teams ==
- Rosario Central 1952–1961
- River Plate 1962
- Inter Milan 1962–1963
- Messina 1963–1964
- Mantova 1964–1965
- Rosario Central 1966–1967
- Deportes Concepción 1968
- Audax Italiano 1969–1970

== Career statistics ==
=== International ===
Appearances and goals by national team and year
National team	Year	Apps	Goals
Argentina	1961	2	1
Argentina	1962	3	1
Total		5	2

Scores and results list Argentina's goal tally first, score column indicates score after each Pagani goal.

List of international goals scored by Marcelo Pagani
No.	Date	Venue	Opponent	Score	Result	Competition	Ref.
1	12 October 1961	Estadio de Independiente, Avellaneda, Argentina	Paraguay	3–0	5–1	Friendly	
2	15 August 1962	Estadio Monumental, Buenos Aires, Argentina	Uruguay	1–0	3–1	1962 Copa Lipton	

== Titles ==
- Inter Milan 1962-1963 (Serie A Italian Championship)
