= Héctor Facundo =

Argentine footballer

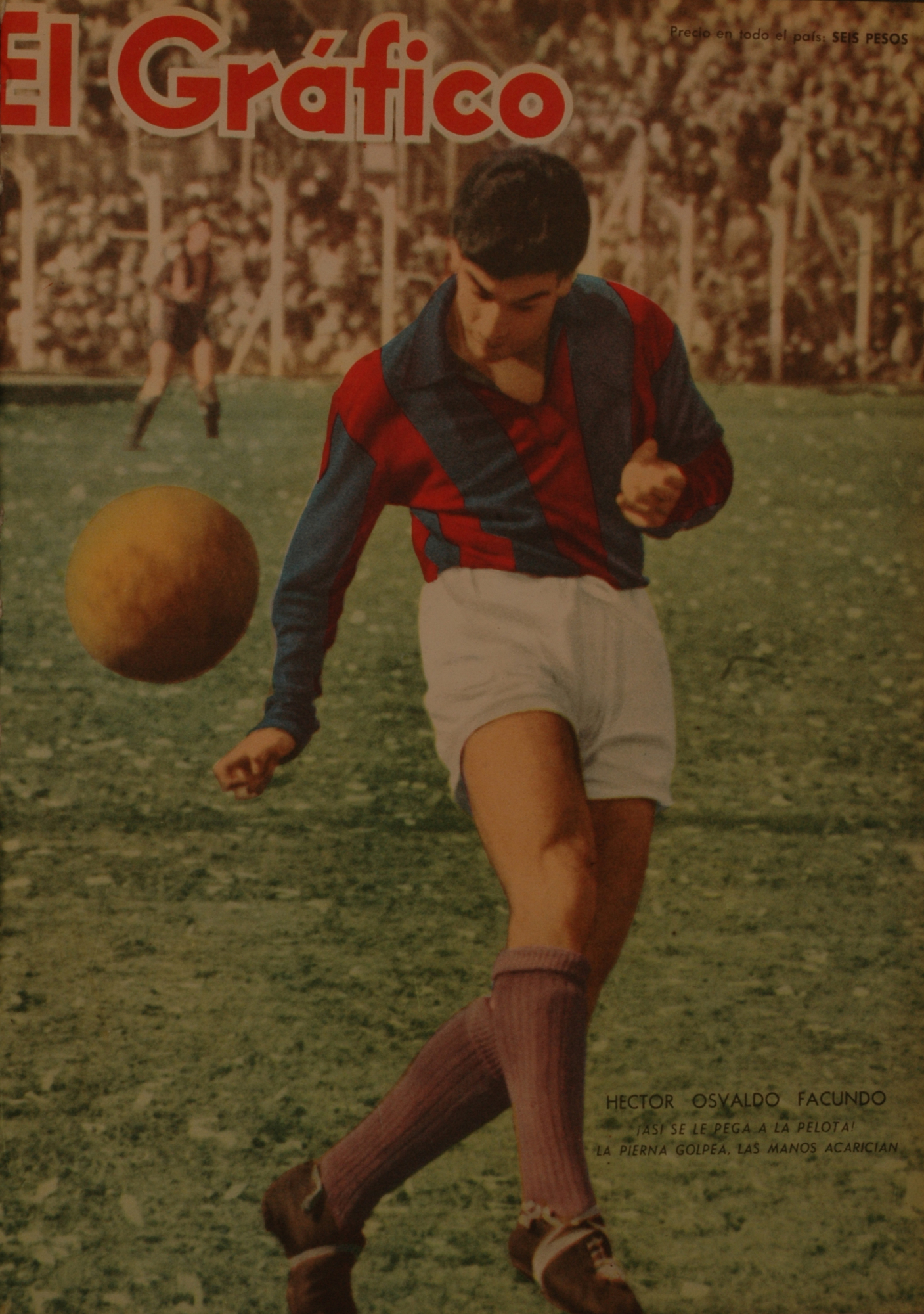
- Facundo in 1959

Personal information
- Full name: Héctor Osvaldo Facundo
- Date of birth: 2 November 1937
- Place of birth: Buenos Aires, Argentina
- Date of death: 13 November 2009 (aged 72)
- Place of death: Argentina
- Position: Forward

Senior career*
Years	Team	Apps	(Gls)
1956–1963	San Lorenzo de Almagro	121	(28)
1964–1965	Huracán	15	(5)

International career
1959-1962	Argentina	7	(1)
- * Club domestic league appearances and goals

Héctor Osvaldo Facundo (2 November 1937 – 13 November 2009) was an Argentine association football player.

Facundo started playing in 1956 at Racing Club de Avellaneda before moving to San Lorenzo de Almagro. With San Lorenzo he won the 1959 Argentine Primera División and took part in the 1960 Copa Libertadores where they reached the semi-finals before getting knocked out by Uruguayan side C.A. Peñarol. Facundo played at San Lorenzo until 1963 and later had a spell with Club Atlético Huracán.

With Argentina national football team Facundo played in the 1959 South American Championship in Ecuador where they finished runners-up behind Uruguay. At the tournament Facundo appeared in matches against Paraguay, Ecuador and Brazil.

Facundo was also called up to Argentina squad for the 1962 FIFA World Cup in Chile, where they were eliminated in the group stage. He appeared in their opening 1–0 win against Bulgaria, in which he scored the winning goal, and in Argentina's final group match versus Hungary.

Sporting positions
Preceded by Agne Simonsson	FIFA World Cup opening goal 1962	Succeeded by Pelé
