= Francisco Valdés =

Chilean footballer (1943-2009)

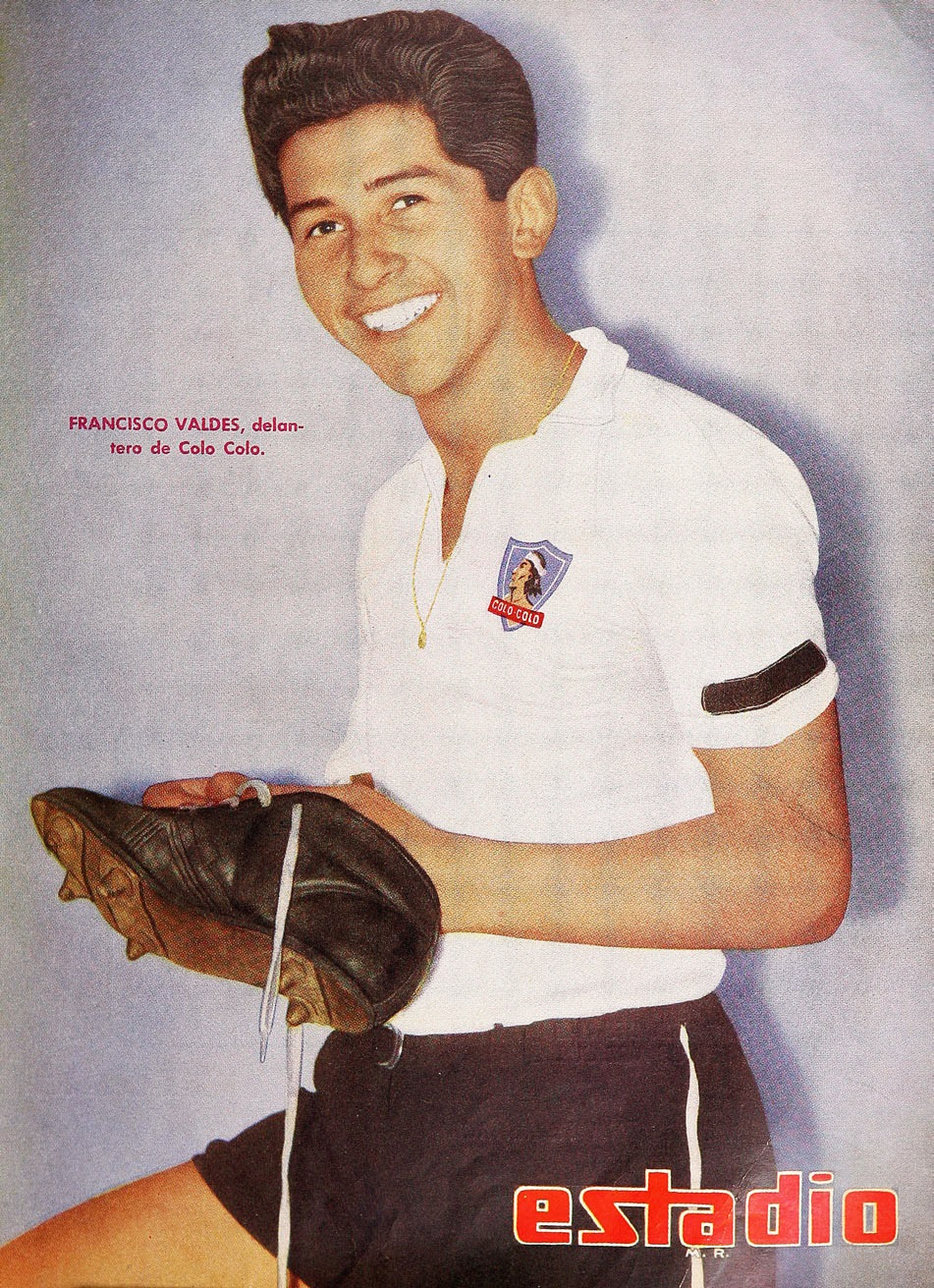

Personal information
- Full name: Francisco Segundo Valdés Muñoz
- Date of birth: 19 March 1943
- Place of birth: Santiago, Chile
- Date of death: 10 August 2009 (aged 66)
- Position: Attacking midfielder

Senior career*
Years	Team	Apps	(Gls)
1961–1969	Colo-Colo	220	(133)
1970	Unión Española	35	(10)
1971	Deportes Antofagasta	30	(10)
1972–1975	Colo-Colo	111	(42)
1976	Santiago Wanderers	26	(11)
1977	Cobreloa	37	(3)
1978	Colo-Colo	23	(4)
1979–1981	Deportes Arica	33	(4)
Total		515	(217)

International career
1962–1975	Chile	52	(9)

Managerial career
- 1987: San Luis
- 1988: Audax Italiano
- 1989: Coquimbo Unido
- 1990: Lota Schwager
- 1991: Deportes Puerto Montt
- 1992: Rangers de Talca
- 1993–1994: Deportes Puerto Montt
- 1996: Magallanes
- * Club domestic league appearances and goals

Francisco Segundo Valdés Muñoz (Note: In this Chilean name, the first or paternal surname is Valdés and the second or maternal family name is Muñoz.) (19 March 1943 – 10 August 2009), nicknamed Chamaco, was a Chilean footballer and manager. Recognized as one of Chile's most important midfielders, with 215 official goals, he was the top scorer in the history of Chilean league until 5 October 2020, when his record was broken by Esteban Paredes.

== Career ==
Valdés always played in the Chilean first division league, where he became the top scorer in their history with 215 goals in 478 official matches, leaving behind Pedro "Heidi" Gonzalez with 212 goals. He is the maximum gunner for Colo Colo in official tournaments with 180 goals scored (179 in 353 matches during the Chilean national championship and 1 goal during the liguilla Copa Libertadores) and the top scorer in Copa Libertadores with 20 goals in 44 matches.

He was the brains, and alongside Carlos Caszely, the star of Colo Colo 1973, and the champion in 1963 and 1972. He was also runner-up on the Copa Libertadores de America in 1973.

Selected by the Chile national team, he played 50 matches, scoring 9 goals. He was the Chile offensive midfielder in the England 1966 and Germany 1974 FIFA World Cups. In 1973, he was runner-up of the Copa Libertadores with Colo Colo, he was also the captain of the Chile national team.

== Personal life ==
On 6 April 1965, Valdés was one of the constituent footballers of SIFUP, the trade union of professionales footballers in Chile, alongside fellows such as Efraín Santander, Mario Ortiz, Hugo Lepe, among others.

He was the uncle of Chilean footballer Sebastián "Chamagol" González.

He died of heart failure at his home at the age of 66.

== Honours ==
Colo Colo

- Primera División de Chile: 1963, 1972
- Copa Chile: 1974
