= 1958 South American U-20 Championship =

1958 South American Youth Championship
Tournament details
- Host country: Chile
- Dates: 13 March – 2 April
- Teams: 6

Final positions
- Champions: Uruguay (2nd title)
- Runners-up: Argentina
- Third place: Brazil
- Fourth place: Peru

Tournament statistics
- Matches played: 15
- Goals scored: 68 (4.53 per match)
- Top scorer: (Argentina) Norberto Raffo (5)

The South American Youth Championship 1958 was held in Santiago and Valparaíso, Chile.

== Teams ==
The following teams entered the tournament:

- Argentina
- Brazil
- Chile (host)
- Peru
- Uruguay
- Venezuela

== Matches ==
Teams	Pld	W	D	L	GF	GA	GD	Pts
Uruguay	5	2	3	0	13	9	+4	7
Argentina	5	2	2	1	16	10	+6	6
Brazil	5	2	2	1	10	6	+4	6
Peru	5	2	2	1	13	13	0	6
Chile	5	1	1	3	10	13	–3	3
Venezuela	5	0	2	3	6	17	–11	2

13 March	Chile	4–2	Venezuela
15 March	Argentina	6–1	Venezuela
	Uruguay	4–2	Peru
18 March	Argentina	5–5	Peru
	Brazil	2–2	Uruguay
20 March	Argentina	2–2	Uruguay
	Peru	3–2	Chile
23 March	Brazil	4–0	Venezuela
	Argentina	3–1	Chile
26 March	Peru	2–1	Brazil
	Uruguay	3–1	Chile
30 March	Venezuela	1–1	Peru
	Brazil	1–0	Argentina
2 April	Venezuela	2–2	Uruguay
	Chile	2–2	Brazil

1958 South American Youth Championship

Uruguay
Second title
