= Hugo Lepe =

Chilean footballer (1940-1991)

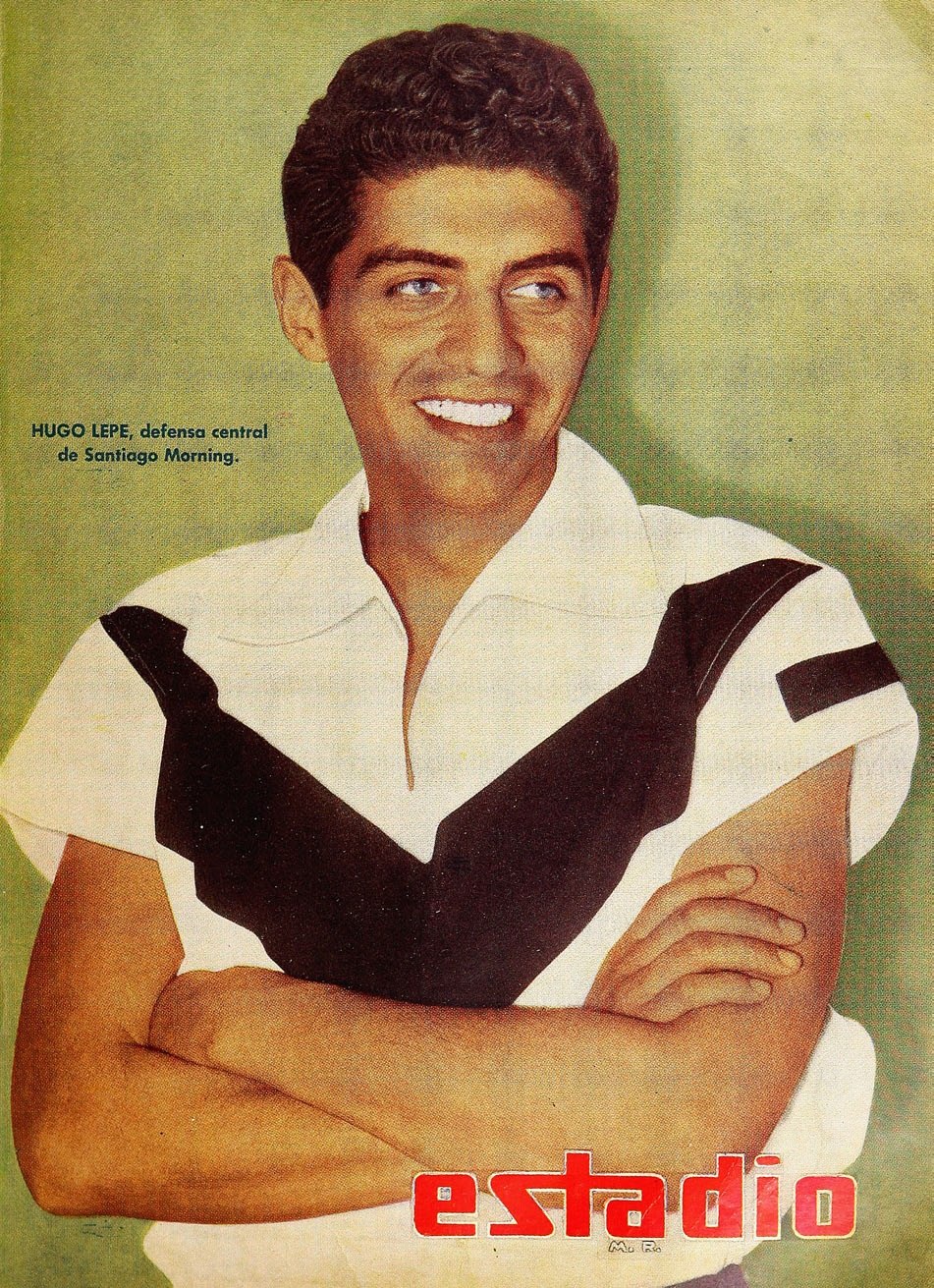
- Lepe in 1961

Personal information
- Full name: Hugo Mario Lepe Gajardo
- Date of birth: 14 April 1940
- Place of birth: Santiago, Chile
- Date of death: 4 July 1991 (aged 51)
- Place of death: Santiago, Chile
- Position: Defender

Youth career
- Dr. Raúl Dennis
- Defensor de Renca
- Universidad de Chile

Senior career*
Years	Team	Apps	(Gls)
1958–1959	Universidad de Chile		
1960–1962	Santiago Morning		
1963–1967	Colo-Colo		

International career
1961	Chile	1	(0)
Medal record
Men's football
Representing Chile
FIFA World Cup
Third place	1962 Chile
- * Club domestic league appearances and goals

Hugo Mario Lepe Gajardo (14 April 1940 – 4 July 1991) was a Chilean football defender who played for Chile in the 1962 FIFA World Cup. He also played for Club Universidad de Chile.

== Personal life ==
On 6 April 1965, Lepe was one of the constituent footballers of SIFUP, the trade union of professionales footballers in Chile, alongside fellows such as Efraín Santander, Francisco Valdés, Misael Escuti, among others.
