= 1962 FIFA World Cup Group 1 =

Group 1 of the 1962 FIFA World Cup took place from 30 May to 7 June 1962. The group consisted of Colombia, the Soviet Union, Uruguay, and Yugoslavia.

== Standings ==
Pos	Team	Pld	W	D	L	GF	GA	GR	Pts	Qualification
1	Soviet Union	3	2	1	0	8	5	1.600	5	Advance to knockout stage
2	Yugoslavia	3	2	0	1	8	3	2.667	4	Advance to knockout stage
3	Uruguay	3	1	0	2	4	6	0.667	2	
4	Colombia	3	0	1	2	5	11	0.455	1	

Source: FIFA

== Matches ==
All times listed are local time.

=== Uruguay vs Colombia ===
Colombians opened the score midway through the first half when Francisco Zuluaga converted a penalty. Uruguayan harsh tackling led to Zuluaga's injury. In the second half Uruguay could come back from behind with Luis Cubilla and José Sasía's shots.

30 May 1962
15:00 CLT (UTC-04)

Uruguay	2–1	Colombia
Cubilla 56'; Sasía 75'		Zuluaga 19' (pen.)

Estadio Carlos Dittborn, Arica
Attendance: 7,908
Referee: Andor Dorogi (Hungary)

Uruguay	Colombia

GK	1	Roberto Sosa
SW	2	Horacio Troche (c)
RB	4	Mario Méndez
CB	3	Emilio Álvarez
LB	18	Eliseo Álvarez
RH	5	Néstor Gonçalves
LH	10	Pedro Rocha
RF	11	Luis Cubilla
IR	19	Ronald Langón
CF	9	José Sasía
LF	7	Domingo Pérez
Manager:
(Uruguay) Juan Carlos Corazzo

GK	1	Efraín Sánchez
RB	9	Jaime Silva
CB	3	Francisco Zuluaga (c)
LB	8	Hector Echeverri
RH	5	Jaime González
LH	11	Óscar López
OR	13	Germán Aceros
IR	15	Marcos Coll
CF	17	Marino Klinger
IL	19	Delio Gamboa
OL	22	Jairo Arias
Manager:
(Argentina) Adolfo Pedernera

=== Soviet Union vs Yugoslavia ===
The Soviet Union dominated the game from the beginning. Soon after half time, they opened the score when Viktor Ponedelnik hit the bar with a free kick and Valentin Ivanov headed in the rebound. In the last minutes, Ponedelnik scored from the edge of the area.

Tragedy struck ten minutes before the final whistle, when Eduard Dubinski was carried away with a broken leg after a clash with Muhamed Mujić, who was later sent home by his team. Dubinski died almost seven years later in 1969 of sarcoma.

31 May 1962
15:00 CLT (UTC-04)

Soviet Union	2–0	Yugoslavia
Ivanov 51'; Ponedelnik 83'

Estadio Carlos Dittborn, Arica
Attendance: 9,622
Referee: Albert Dusch (West Germany)

Soviet Union	Yugoslavia

GK	1	Lev Yashin
RB	4	Eduard Dubinski
CB	7	Anatoli Maslyonkin
LB	6	Leonīds Ostrovskis
RH	12	Valery Voronin
LH	10	Igor Netto (c)
OR	18	Slava Metreveli
IR	14	Valentin Ivanov
CF	19	Viktor Ponedelnik
IL	15	Viktor Kanevskyi
OL	17	Mikheil Meskhi
Manager:
(Soviet Union) Gavriil Kachalin

GK	1	Milutin Šoškić
RB	2	Vladimir Durković
CB	5	Vlatko Marković
LB	3	Fahrudin Jusufi
RH	15	Željko Matuš
LH	6	Vladica Popović
OR	16	Muhamed Mujić
IR	8	Dragoslav Šekularac
CF	9	Dražan Jerković
IL	10	Milan Galić (c)
OL	11	Josip Skoblar
Co-managers:
(Socialist Federal Republic of Yugoslavia) Ljubomir Lovrić & Prvoslav Mihajlović

=== Yugoslavia vs Uruguay ===
Uruguay took an early lead in the 19th minute with a goal from Ángel Cabrera. Yugoslavia responded with determination. In the 25th minute, Josip Skoblar converted a penalty to equalize the score. Shortly after, in the 29th minute, Milan Galić scored, giving Yugoslavia a 2–1 advantage. Early in the second half, Dražan Jerković extended Yugoslavia's lead with a goal in the 49th minute, bringing the score to 3–1. Yugoslavia maintained their lead for the remainder of the match, securing a 3–1 victory over Uruguay. This win was crucial for Yugoslavia's progression in the tournament, contributing to their advancement from the group stage. The match is remembered for Yugoslavia's effective comeback after conceding the initial goal.

2 June 1962
15:00 CLT (UTC-04)

Yugoslavia	3–1	Uruguay
Skoblar 25' (pen.); Galić 29'; Jerković 49'		Cabrera 19'

Estadio Carlos Dittborn, Arica
Attendance: 8,829
Referee: Karol Galba (Czechoslovakia)

Yugoslavia	Uruguay

GK	1	Milutin Šoškić
RB	2	Vladimir Durković
CB	5	Vlatko Marković
LB	3	Fahrudin Jusufi
RH	4	Petar Radaković
LH	6	Vladica Popović	(red card) 71'
OR	17	Vojislav Melić
IR	8	Dragoslav Šekularac
CF	9	Dražan Jerković
IL	10	Milan Galić (c)
OL	11	Josip Skoblar
Manager:
Ljubomir Lovrić & Prvoslav Mihajlović

GK	1	Roberto Sosa
RB	2	Horacio Troche (c)
CB	3	Emilio Álvarez
CB	18	Eliseo Álvarez
LB	4	Mario Méndez
RH	10	Pedro Rocha
LH	5	Néstor Gonçalves
OR	20	Mario Bergara
IR	22	Ángel Cabrera	(red card) 71'
IL	9	José Sasía
OL	7	Domingo Pérez
Co-managers:
Juan Carlos Corazzo

=== Soviet Union vs Colombia ===
The Soviet team scored three quick goals in the first 11 minutes of the game but then let the Colombians make an impressive comeback in the late second half. In the 68 minute Marcos Coll scored a goal directly from a corner, the first Olympic goal in World Cup history.

3 June 1962
15:00 CLT (UTC-04)

Soviet Union	4–4	Colombia
Ivanov 8', 11'; Chislenko 10'; Ponedelnik 56'		Aceros 21'; Coll 68'; Rada 72'; Klinger 86'

Estadio Carlos Dittborn, Arica
Attendance: 8,040
Referee: João Etzel Filho (Brazil)

Soviet Union	Colombia

GK	1	Lev Yashin
RB	5	Givi Chokheli
CB	7	Anatoli Maslyonkin
LB	6	Leonīds Ostrovskis
RH	12	Valery Voronin
LH	10	Igor Netto (c)
OR	22	Igor Chislenko
IR	14	Valentin Ivanov
CF	19	Viktor Ponedelnik
IL	15	Viktor Kanevskyi
OL	17	Mikheil Meskhi
Manager:
(Soviet Union) Gavriil Kachalin

GK	1	Efraín Sánchez (c)
RB	4	Aníbal Alzate
CB	5	Jaime González
CB	11	Óscar López
LB	8	Hector Echeverri
RH	10	Rolando Serrano
LH	15	Marcos Coll
OR	13	Germán Aceros
IR	17	Marino Klinger
IL	20	Antonio Rada
OL	21	Héctor González
Manager:
(Argentina) Adolfo Pedernera

=== Soviet Union vs Uruguay ===
6 June 1962
15:00 CLT (UTC-04)

Soviet Union	2–1	Uruguay
Mamykin 38'; Ivanov 89'		Sasía 54'

Estadio Carlos Dittborn, Arica
Attendance: 9,973
Referee: Cesare Jonni (Italy)

Soviet Union	Uruguay

GK	1	Lev Yashin
RB	5	Givi Chokheli
CB	7	Anatoli Maslyonkin
LB	6	Leonīds Ostrovskis
RH	12	Valery Voronin
LH	10	Igor Netto (c)
OR	22	Igor Chislenko
IR	14	Valentin Ivanov
CF	19	Viktor Ponedelnik
IL	16	Aleksei Mamykin
OL	21	Galimzyan Khusainov
Manager:
(Soviet Union) Gavriil Kachalin

GK	1	Roberto Sosa
RB	2	Horacio Troche (c)
CB	3	Emilio Álvarez
CB	18	Eliseo Álvarez
LB	4	Mario Méndez
RH	8	Julio César Cortés
LH	5	Néstor Gonçalves
OR	11	Luis Cubilla
IR	22	Ángel Cabrera
IL	9	José Sasía
OL	7	Domingo Pérez
Manager:
(Uruguay) Juan Carlos Corazzo

=== Yugoslavia vs Colombia ===
7 June 1962
15:00 CLT (UTC-04)

Yugoslavia	5–0	Colombia
Galić 20', 61'; Jerković 25', 87'; Melić 82'

Estadio Carlos Dittborn, Arica
Attendance: 7,167
Referee: Carlos Robles (Chile)

Yugoslavia	Colombia

GK	1	Milutin Šoškić
RB	2	Vladimir Durković
CB	5	Vlatko Marković
LB	3	Fahrudin Jusufi
RH	4	Petar Radaković
LH	6	Vladica Popović
OR	7	Andrija Anković
IR	8	Dragoslav Šekularac
CF	9	Dražan Jerković
IL	10	Milan Galić (c)
OL	17	Vojislav Melić
Manager:
Ljubomir Lovrić & Prvoslav Mihajlović

GK	1	Efraín Sánchez (c)
RB	4	Aníbal Alzate
CB	5	Jaime González
CB	11	Óscar López
LB	8	Hector Echeverri
RH	10	Rolando Serrano
LH	15	Marcos Coll
OR	13	Germán Aceros
IR	17	Marino Klinger
IL	20	Antonio Rada
OL	21	Héctor González
Manager:
Adolfo Pedernera

== See also ==
- Colombia at the FIFA World Cup
- Soviet Union at the FIFA World Cup
- Uruguay at the FIFA World Cup
- Yugoslavia at the FIFA World Cup
