= Colombia at the FIFA World Cup =

International football delegation

This is a record of Colombia's results at the FIFA World Cup. The FIFA World Cup is an international association football competition contested by the men's national teams of the members of Fédération Internationale de Football Association (FIFA), the sport's global governing body. The championship has been awarded every four years since the first tournament in 1930, except in 1942 and 1946, due to World War II.

The tournament consists of two parts, the qualification phase and the final phase (officially called the World Cup Finals). The qualification phase, which currently takes place over the three years preceding the finals, is used to determine which teams qualify for the finals. The current format of the finals involves 48 teams competing for the title, at venues within the host nation (or nations) over a period of about a month. The World Cup final is the most widely viewed sporting event in the world, with an estimated 715.1 million people watching the 2006 tournament final.

Colombia has appeared in the FIFA World Cup on seven occasions, in 1962, 1990, 1994, 1998, 2014, 2018 and 2026.

== Overall record ==
FIFA World Cup record
Year	Round	Position	Pld	W	D*	L	GF	GA
(Uruguay) 1930	Not a FIFA member							
(Italy) 1934	Not a FIFA member							
(France) 1938	Withdrew							
(Brazil) 1950	Banned by FIFA							
(Switzerland) 1954	Banned by FIFA							
(Sweden) 1958	Did not qualify							
(Chile) 1962	Group stage	14th	3	0	1	2	5	11
(England) 1966	Did not qualify							
(Mexico) 1970	Did not qualify							
(Germany) 1974	Did not qualify							
(Argentina) 1978	Did not qualify							
(Spain) 1982	Did not qualify							
(Mexico) 1986	Did not qualify							
(Italy) 1990	Round of 16	14th	4	1	1	2	4	4
(United States) 1994	Group stage	19th	3	1	0	2	4	5
(France) 1998	Group stage	21st	3	1	0	2	1	3
(South Korea) (Japan) 2002	Did not qualify							
(Germany) 2006	Did not qualify							
(South Africa) 2010	Did not qualify							
(Brazil) 2014	Quarter-finals	5th	5	4	0	1	12	4
(Russia) 2018	Round of 16	9th	4	2	1	1	6	3
(Qatar) 2022	Did not qualify							
(Canada) (Mexico) (United States) 2026	Round of 16	10th	5	3	2	0	5	1
(Morocco) (Portugal) (Spain) 2030	To be determined							
(Saudi Arabia) 2034	To be determined							
Total	Quarter-finals	7/23	27	12	5	10	37	31

*Draws include knockout matches decided via penalty shoot-out

=== By match ===
Year	Round	Opponents	Score	Colombia scorers
(Chile) 1962	Group 1	Uruguay	1–2	Zuluaga
(Chile) 1962	Group 1	Soviet Union	4–4	Aceros, Coll, Rada, Klinger
(Chile) 1962	Group 1	Yugoslavia	0–5	—
(Italy) 1990	Group D	United Arab Emirates	2–0	Redín, Valderrama
(Italy) 1990	Group D	Yugoslavia	0–1	—
(Italy) 1990	Group D	West Germany	1–1	Rincón
(Italy) 1990	Round of 16	Cameroon	1–2 (a.e.t.)	Redín
(United States) 1994	Group A	Romania	1–3	Valencia
(United States) 1994	Group A	United States	1–2	Valencia
(United States) 1994	Group A	Switzerland	2–0	Gaviria, Lozano
(France) 1998	Group G	Romania	0–1	—
(France) 1998	Group G	Tunisia	1–0	Preciado
(France) 1998	Group G	England	0–2	—
(Brazil) 2014	Group C	Greece	3–0	Armero, Gutiérrez, Rodríguez
(Brazil) 2014	Group C	Ivory Coast	2–1	Rodríguez, Quintero
(Brazil) 2014	Group C	Japan	4–1	Cuadrado, Martínez (2), Rodríguez
(Brazil) 2014	Round of 16	Uruguay	2–0	Rodríguez (2)
(Brazil) 2014	Quarter-final	Brazil	1–2	Rodríguez
(Russia) 2018	Group H	Japan	1–2	Quintero
(Russia) 2018	Group H	Poland	3–0	Mina, Falcao, Cuadrado
(Russia) 2018	Group H	Senegal	1–0	Mina
(Russia) 2018	Round of 16	England	1–1 (a.e.t.) (3–4 p)	Mina
(Canada) (Mexico) (United States) 2026	Group K	Uzbekistan	3–1	Muñoz, Díaz, Campaz
(Canada) (Mexico) (United States) 2026	Group K	DR Congo	1–0	Muñoz
(Canada) (Mexico) (United States) 2026	Group K	Portugal	0–0	—
(Canada) (Mexico) (United States) 2026	Round of 32	Ghana	1–0	Arias
(Canada) (Mexico) (United States) 2026	Round of 16	Switzerland	0–0 (a.e.t.) (3–4 p)	—

=== By opponent ===
Country	Played	Won	Drawn	Lost	GF	GA	GD
Japan	2	1	0	1	5	3	+2
Uruguay	2	1	0	1	3	2	+1
England	2	0	1	1	1	3	-2
Romania	2	0	0	2	1	4	-3
Yugoslavia	2	0	0	2	0	6	-6
Greece	1	1	0	0	3	0	+3
Poland	1	1	0	0	3	0	+3
Uzbekistan	1	1	0	0	3	1	+2
United Arab Emirates	1	1	0	0	2	0	+2
Switzerland	2	1	1	0	2	0	+2
Ivory Coast	1	1	0	0	2	1	+1
Tunisia	1	1	0	0	1	0	+1
Senegal	1	1	0	0	1	0	+1
DR Congo	1	1	0	0	1	0	+1
Ghana	1	1	0	0	1	0	+1
Soviet Union	1	0	1	0	4	4	0
West Germany	1	0	1	0	1	1	0
Portugal	1	0	1	0	0	0	0
Cameroon	1	0	0	1	1	2	-1
United States	1	0	0	1	1	2	-1
Brazil	1	0	0	1	1	2	-1

== Colombia at the 1962 FIFA World Cup ==
In the 1962 qualifiers, they faced Peru in a two-game series and qualified for their first World Cup.

Pos	Team	Pld	W	D	L	GF	GA	GD	Pts
1	Colombia	2	1	1	0	2	1	+1	3
2	Peru	2	0	1	1	1	2	−1	1

30 April 1961	Colombia	1 – 0	Peru	Bogotá, Colombia
	Gonzalez			Referee: Praddaude (Argentina)

7 May 1961	Peru	1 – 1	Colombia	Lima, Peru
	Delgado 3'		Aceros	Referee: Marino (Uruguay)

Colombia qualified.

At Chile 1962, Colombia lost 2–1 to South American champions Uruguay in their opening match. They then drew 4–4 with the reigning European champions Soviet Union in one of biggest shocks at Chile 1962. In this game, Colombia scored four goals against Soviet goalkeeper Lev Yashin, widely considered the best goalkeeper in football history. Also in that game, Marcos Coll scored the only Olympic goal in World Cup history. Additionally, in coming back from three goals down to draw the match, the Colombians completed the biggest comeback to draw in World Cup history. Unfortunately, their campaign ended with a 5–0 defeat to Euro 1960 runners-up Yugoslavia, so they went out in the group stage.

Group One

Team	Pld	W	D	L	GF	GA	GD	Pts
Soviet Union	3	2	1	0	8	5	+3	5
Yugoslavia	3	2	0	1	8	3	+5	4
Uruguay	3	1	0	2	4	6	−2	2
Colombia	3	0	1	2	5	11	−6	1

== Colombia at the 1990 FIFA World Cup ==
At Italia '90, Colombia defeated United Arab Emirates 2–0, lost to Yugoslavia 1–0, and earned their place in the Round of Sixteen after a dramatic 1–1 draw with West Germany, which would later win the Cup. Group D

Team	Pld	W	D	L	GF	GA	GD	Pts
West Germany	3	2	1	0	10	3	+7	5
Yugoslavia	3	2	0	1	6	5	+1	4
Colombia	3	1	1	1	3	2	+1	3
United Arab Emirates	3	0	0	3	2	11	−9	0

During their Round of Sixteen match against Cameroon, the game went into extra time after a 0–0 draw. In an unfortunate moment, goalkeeper René Higuita failed to protect the ball 35 yards (32 m) from the goal line, enabling Cameroon striker Roger Milla to snatch it from him, and score Cameroon's decisive second goal. Milla struck twice, giving Cameroon a 2–0 lead in extra time. Colombia would score in the 115th minute, but were unable to get an equalizer.

== Colombia at the 1994 FIFA World Cup ==
Qualification — CONMEBOL Group One

Team	Pld	W	D	L	GF	GA	GD	Pts
Colombia	6	4	2	0	13	2	+11	10
Argentina	6	3	1	2	7	9	−2	7
Paraguay	6	1	4	1	6	7	−1	6
Peru	6	0	1	5	4	12	−8	1

Colombia qualified. Argentina advanced to the CONMEBOL / CONCACAF / OFC Intercontinental Play-off.

Colombia finished top of their qualifying group without having lost a match, which included a historic 5–0 win over Argentina in Buenos Aires. Expectations of the team were high, some even naming them as favourites to win the tournament.

The match between Colombia and Romania was the first game for either side in the group phase. Romania took the lead in the 16th minute with their first attack of the match when Raducioiu took on three defenders before firing home a low shot. On the half hour mark, Hagi made it 2–0 when he noticed Córdoba out of position and dipped a cross over his head into the net. Valencia pulled a goal back for the Colombians in the 43rd minute when he headed in a corner from Perez. In the second half, Raducioiu put the result beyond doubt with his second goal in the final few minutes.
The team went into their second group game against the United States knowing they had to win to have any chance of progressing. On the 35th minute Andrés Escobar attempted to cut out a cross but accidentally deflected the ball into his own net. Earnie Stewart took the US two goals in front after scoring in the 56th minute. Valencia scored a consolation goal for Colombia in the closing minutes of the match. They did win their final group match 2–0 over Switzerland, but it was not enough to help them progress

Group A

Team	Pld	W	D	L	GF	GA	GD	Pts
Romania	3	2	0	1	5	5	0	6
Switzerland	3	1	1	1	5	4	+1	4
United States	3	1	1	1	3	3	0	4
Colombia	3	1	0	2	4	5	−1	3

USA	1 – 1	Switzerland
Colombia	1 – 3	Romania
Switzerland	4 – 1	Romania
USA	2 – 1	Colombia
Switzerland	0 – 2	Colombia
USA	0 – 1	Romania

=== Andrés Escobar ===
Six days after Colombia's last match against Switzerland, Andrés Escobar was shot in Medellín by known drug cartel criminals. Escobar had previously scored an own goal in the group stage match against the United States.

== Colombia at the 1998 FIFA World Cup ==
Colombia began their qualification rounds in South America well and ended in third place with 28 points, 2 points below Argentina who was in 1st place with 30 points. They ended in Group G with Tunisia, England, and Romania.

Qualification For France 98: A total of 10 CONMEBOL teams entered the competition. The South American zone was allocated 5 places (out of 32) in the final tournament. Brazil, the defending champions, qualified automatically, leaving 4 spots open for competition between 9 teams.

Final standings
Pos	Team	Pld	W	D	L	GF	GA	GD	Pts
1	Argentina	16	8	6	2	23	13	+10	30
2	Paraguay	16	9	2	5	21	14	+7	29
3	Colombia	16	8	4	4	23	15	+8	28
4	Chile	16	7	4	5	32	18	+14	25
5	Peru	16	7	4	5	19	20	−1	25
6	Ecuador	16	6	3	7	22	21	+1	21
7	Uruguay	16	6	3	7	18	21	−3	21
8	Bolivia	16	4	5	7	18	21	−3	17
9	Venezuela	16	0	3	13	8	41	−33	3

Argentina, Paraguay, Colombia and Chile qualified.

Group G

Team	Pld	W	D	L	GF	GA	GD	Pts
Romania	3	2	1	0	4	2	+2	7
England	3	2	0	1	5	2	+3	6
Colombia	3	1	0	2	1	3	−2	3
Tunisia	3	0	1	2	1	4	−3	1

England	2 - 0	Tunisia
Romania	1 - 0	Colombia
Colombia	1 - 0	Tunisia
Romania	2 - 1	England
Colombia	0 - 2	England
Romania	1 - 1	Tunisia

In their opening match, Adrian Ilie of Valencia CF gave Romania a 1–0 victory over Colombia after he placed a magnificent chip shot in the 44th minute from some 15 yards (14 m) that sailed over goalkeeper Faryd Mondragón into the net.

15 June 1998
17:30

Romania	1 – 0	Colombia
Ilie 45'	Report

Stade de Gerland, Lyon
Attendance: 37,572
Referee: Lim Kee Chong (Mauritius)

Colombia's second match was against Tunisia. Colombia's Léider Preciado struck seven minutes from the end to give a 1–0 win.

22 June 1998
17:30

Colombia	1 – 0	Tunisia
Preciado 83'	Report

Stade de la Mosson, Montpellier
Attendance: 29,800
Referee: Bernd Heynemann (Germany)

Although England needed only a draw to guarantee a place in the final 16, Darren Anderton drove home a fiercely struck angled drive in the 20th minute. David Beckham curled in a 30-yard (27 m) free kick nine minutes later and England won the game 2–0. Colombia was thus eliminated.

26 June 1998
21:00

Colombia	0 – 2	England
	Report	Anderton 20'; Beckham 29'

Stade Félix-Bollaert, Lens
Attendance: 38,100
Referee: Arturo Brizio Carter (Mexico)

== Colombia at the 2014 FIFA World Cup ==
After 16 years out of the World Cup, Colombia won their first match against Greece by a score of 3–0, marking the country's best ever performance in FIFA World Cup. The first goal was scored by Pablo Armero five minutes after the kick-off, Teofilo Gutierrez scored the second goal from a corner shot, James Rodriguez made their final score during the three minutes overtime. Colombia went on to beat Ivory Coast 2-1 and Japan 4–1. For the first time in history, Colombia won their group in group stages at the Fifa World Cup. They defeated Uruguay 2–0 in the Round of 16, marking the deepest run in the World Cup ever for the Colombia national team. They met Brazil in the quarter-finals and were narrowly defeated 2–1, bringing to an end their most successful World Cup campaign to date.

Final standings

Pos	Team	Pld	W	D	L	GF	GA	GD	Pts	Qualification
1	Argentina	16	9	5	2	35	15	+20	32	2014 FIFA World Cup
2	Colombia	16	9	3	4	27	13	+14	30	2014 FIFA World Cup
3	Chile	16	9	1	6	29	25	+4	28	2014 FIFA World Cup
4	Ecuador	16	7	4	5	20	16	+4	25	2014 FIFA World Cup
5	Uruguay	16	7	4	5	25	25	0	25	Inter-confederation play-offs
6	Venezuela	16	5	5	6	14	20	−6	20	
7	Peru	16	4	3	9	17	26	−9	15	
8	Bolivia	16	2	6	8	17	30	−13	12	
9	Paraguay	16	3	3	10	17	31	−14	12	

Source: FIFA

Brazil (host), Argentina, Colombia, Chile, Ecuador and Uruguay qualified.

Group C

Pos	Team	Pld	W	D	L	GF	GA	GD	Pts	Qualification
1	Colombia	3	3	0	0	9	2	+7	9	Advance to knockout stage
2	Greece	3	1	1	1	2	4	−2	4	Advance to knockout stage
3	Ivory Coast	3	1	0	2	4	5	−1	3	
4	Japan	3	0	1	2	2	6	−4	1	

Source: FIFA
Rules for classification: Tie-breaking criteria

Colombia	3 - 0	Greece
Ivory Coast	2 - 1	Japan
Colombia	2 - 1	Ivory Coast
Japan	0 - 0	Greece
Japan	1 - 4	Colombia
Greece	2 - 1	Ivory Coast

The two teams had met in one previous match, in a friendly in 1994, where Colombia won 2–0. Colombia midfielder Fredy Guarín was suspended for the match, after being sent off in the team's final qualifier against Paraguay.

Colombia took the lead within five minutes, Juan Cuadrado's cutback was converted by Pablo Armero via a deflection off Greek defender Kostas Manolas. Colombia extended the lead in the second half, when Abel Aguilar flicked on a corner kick from James Rodríguez and Teófilo Gutiérrez scored from close range. Greece's best chance fell to Theofanis Gekas, who headed against the bar. In stoppage time, Cuadrado set up James to complete the scoring with a low shot.

The 3–0 scoreline was Colombia's biggest win to date in the World Cup.

14 June 2014
13:00 UTC−3

Colombia	3–0	Greece
Armero 5'; Gutiérrez 58'; Rodríguez 90+3'	Report

Estádio Mineirão, Belo Horizonte
Attendance: 57,174
Referee: Mark Geiger (United States)

The two teams had never met before.

After a goalless first half, Colombia scored first when James Rodríguez headed in Juan Cuadrado's corner. The lead was extended six minutes later when Ivory Coast was caught in possession, and Teófilo Gutiérrez released substitute Juan Quintero to score. Ivory Coast reduced the deficit through Gervinho, who received a pass from Arthur Boka in the left wing, dribbled past three Colombian players and shot home.

The second goal of the tournament by James allowed him to join Bernardo Redín and Adolfo Valencia as the only Colombian players to score more than one goal in the World Cup.

19 June 2014
13:00 UTC−3

Colombia	2–1	Ivory Coast
Rodríguez 64'; Quintero 70'	Report	Gervinho 73'

Estádio Nacional Mané Garrincha, Brasília
Attendance: 68,748
Referee: Howard Webb (England)

The two teams had met in two previous matches, most recently in a friendly in 2007, and also in the 2003 FIFA Confederations Cup group stage, won by Colombia 1–0.

Colombia took the lead mid-way through the first half, with Juan Cuadrado taking a penalty kick, shooting low down the middle after Japan centre back Yasuyuki Konno fouled Colombia striker Adrián Ramos in the box. Japan then equalised through Shinji Okazaki's headed goal from a cross from Keisuke Honda on the right in first half stoppage time. Colombia's James Rodríguez was introduced after the half time break, and was credited for providing two assists for two goals scored by Jackson Martínez, on 55 minutes when he shot low to the net with his left foot, and 82 minutes when he curled the ball in from the right of the penalty area with his left foot, before finishing off the scoring with a strike of his own, assisted by Ramos, where he beat the last man before clipping the ball over the goalkeeper. Colombia, which had already qualified for the knockout stage but needed a point to be certain of winning the group, finished as group winners with a perfect record of three wins out of three, while Japan, which had to win the match to have any chance to qualify, were eliminated.

Faryd Mondragón became the oldest player to make an appearance in the history of the World Cup, at the age of 43 years, 3 days, when he came on for the last five minutes of the match, breaking the record of Roger Milla, who played at the 1994 World Cup at the age of 42. He also set the record for the longest time between World Cup appearances as 15 years and 363 days had passed since his last versus England at the 1998 World Cup, breaking Alfred Bickel's record of 12 years and 13 days between appearances (1938–1950).

24 June 2014
16:00 UTC−4

Japan	1–4	Colombia
Okazaki 45+1'	Report	Cuadrado 17' (pen.); Martínez 55', 82'; Rodríguez 90'

Arena Pantanal, Cuiabá
Attendance: 40,340
Referee: Pedro Proença (Portugal)

Eighth-finals

The two teams had met in 38 previous matches, including in the 1962 FIFA World Cup group stage, won 2–1 by Uruguay. Their most recent meetings were in the 2014 FIFA World Cup qualifiers, with both teams winning at home, Colombia winning 4–0 and Uruguay winning 2–0. Uruguayan striker Luis Suárez was not in the line-up because of a nine-game ban imposed by FIFA due to a biting incident involving Italian defender Giorgio Chiellini during their final group stage match.

Colombia won 2–0 with both goals from James Rodríguez, the first in the 28th minute, where he controlled Abel Aguilar's headed ball on his chest before volleying left-footed from 25 yards out with the ball going in off the underside of the crossbar, which won the 2014 FIFA Puskás Award later in the year. The second goal, in the 50th minute, was a close-range shot from six yards out after receiving the ball from a header by Juan Cuadrado on the right.

Colombia progressed through to the quarter-finals for the first time in their history, where they would face Brazil.

28 June 2014
17:00

Colombia	2–0	Uruguay
Rodríguez 28', 50'	Report

Estádio do Maracanã, Rio de Janeiro
Attendance: 73,804
Referee: Björn Kuipers (Netherlands)

Quarter-finals

The two teams had met in 25 previous matches, but never in the FIFA World Cup. This was the first time Colombia had reached the quarter-finals of the World Cup. Brazil midfielder Luiz Gustavo was suspended for the match due to accumulation of yellow cards.

Brazil took the lead in the 7th minute, when Neymar's corner from the left was turned in from close range by Thiago Silva. They doubled the lead in the 69th minute when David Luiz scored directly from a long-range free kick, side-footing the ball over the wall and into the top-right corner. Colombia reduced the deficit with 10 minutes to go, when James Rodríguez converted a penalty kick low into the left corner and sent the goalkeeper the wrong way. The penalty was awarded after substitute Carlos Bacca was fouled by Brazil goalkeeper Júlio César. Neymar was kneed in the back by Colombia defender Juan Camilo Zúñiga in the 88th minute, which resulted in the striker's withdrawal from the match. Subsequent medical evaluation discovered a fractured vertebra, forcing the Brazilian to miss the remainder of the tournament. Brazil advanced to the semi-final, where they faced Germany.

James's sixth goal of the tournament was enough for him to win the Golden Boot award. He also became the first player to score in his first five career World Cup matches since Peru's Teófilo Cubillas (across the 1970 and 1978 tournaments).

4 July 2014
17:00

Brazil	2–1	Colombia
Thiago Silva 7'; David Luiz 69'	Report	Rodríguez 80' (pen.)

Estádio Castelão, Fortaleza
Attendance: 60,342
Referee: Carlos Velasco Carballo (Spain)

== Colombia at the 2018 FIFA World Cup ==
Final standings

Pos	Team	Pld	W	D	L	GF	GA	GD	Pts	Qualification
1	Brazil	18	12	5	1	41	11	+30	41	2018 FIFA World Cup
2	Uruguay	18	9	4	5	32	20	+12	31	2018 FIFA World Cup
3	Argentina	18	7	7	4	19	16	+3	28	2018 FIFA World Cup
4	Colombia	18	7	6	5	21	19	+2	27	2018 FIFA World Cup
5	Peru	18	7	5	6	27	26	+1	26	Inter-confederation play-offs
6	Chile	18	8	2	8	26	27	−1	26	
7	Paraguay	18	7	3	8	19	25	−6	24	
8	Ecuador	18	6	2	10	26	29	−3	20	
9	Bolivia	18	4	2	12	16	38	−22	14	
10	Venezuela	18	2	6	10	19	35	−16	12	

Source: FIFA

Group stage

Pos	Team	Pld	W	D	L	GF	GA	GD	Pts	Qualification
1	Colombia	3	2	0	1	5	2	+3	6	Advance to knockout stage
2	Japan	3	1	1	1	4	4	0	4 (Note: Fair play points: Japan −4, Senegal −6.)	Advance to knockout stage
3	Senegal	3	1	1	1	4	4	0	4	
4	Poland	3	1	0	2	2	5	−3	3	

Source: FIFA
Rules for classification: Group stage tiebreakers
Notes:

The two teams had met in three previous matches, most recently in a 2014 FIFA World Cup group stage game, won by Colombia 4–1.

In the third minute, Carlos Sánchez blocked Shinji Kagawa's 20-yard shot with his arm and the referee pointed to the penalty spot before showing the midfielder a straight red card. After lengthy protests, Sanchez eventually left the field and Kagawa slotted the penalty into the bottom right corner of the net. José Pékerman then replaced Juan Cuadrado with Wílmar Barrios at the half-hour mark, and an equaliser arrived nine minutes later, from a Juan Fernando Quintero free kick, shot low under the jumping wall which the goalkeeper failed to keep out. In the second half, David Ospina dived full length to his left to stop Takashi Inui's curling 20-yard shot. Yuya Osako then headed the ball into the far corner of the net from a Keisuke Honda corner from the left. With 13 minutes left, James Rodríguez's strike from inside the box was turned over the crossbar by the outstretched leg of Osako.

19 June 2018
15:00 MSK (UTC+3)

Colombia	1–2	Japan
Quintero 39'		Kagawa 6' (pen.); Osako 73'

Mordovia Arena, Saransk
Attendance: 40,842
Referee: Damir Skomina (Slovenia)

The two teams had met in five matches, most recently in a 2006 friendly, won by Colombia 2–1.

Abel Aguilar was taken from the field on a stretcher in the 32nd minute and was replaced by Mateus Uribe. Shortly after, a cross by James Rodríguez from the right was met by the head of Yerry Mina, who lost his marker to head over Wojciech Szczęsny's outstretched arms and into the net. Juan Fernando Quintero fired wide from 25 yards at the start of the second half. Cuadrado then squared to Radamel Falcao on the edge of the box who lifted his shot well over the crossbar. In the 58th minute, Robert Lewandowski controlled a long pass only to shoot straight into David Ospina's midriff as Poland attempted their first shot on target of the game. Quintero's slide-rule pass presented Falcao with a one-on-one situation and he guided the ball past Szczęsny with the outside of his right foot to double his side's lead. With 15 minutes left on the clock, James' pass from the left found Cuadrado in space through the middle and he took a touch before finishing it into the bottom-right corner of the net.

Poland were the first European nation to be eliminated from the 2018 World Cup. Including Colombia's victory against Poland, there were 14 World Cup goals scored on 24 June 2018 - the most on a single day of action in the competition (maximum 3 games) since 10 June 1990 (also 14).

24 June 2018
21:00 MSK (UTC+3)

Poland	0–3	Colombia
		Mina 40'; Falcao 70'; Ju. Cuadrado 75'

Kazan Arena, Kazan
Attendance: 42,873
Referee: César Arturo Ramos (Mexico)

The two teams had met only once, a 2014 friendly game which ended in a 2–2 draw.

The referee awarded Senegal a penalty in the 17th minute. After consulting VAR, he judged that defender Davinson Sánchez had won the ball before making any contact with Sadio Mané. After half an hour, James Rodríguez was substituted with what appeared to be a recurrence of the injury that kept him out of Colombia's 2–1 loss to Japan. Mané took a free-kick in the 64th minute which he shot off-target. Kalidou Koulibaly got a touch on a Luis Muriel drive to deflect the ball narrowly wide. And in the 74th minute Colombia scored the decisive goal of the game, Juan Quintero's corner from the right found Yerry Mina who rose and crashed home a header that went through goalkeeper Khadim N'Diaye.

With Senegal being the last African team to be knocked out of Russia 2018, there were no teams from Africa in the Round of 16 for the first time since the stage was introduced in 1986. Colombia were the only team to reach the knockout stages of Russia 2018 despite losing their opening match of the tournament. Senegal became the third team to be eliminated from Russia 2018 despite winning their opening game of the tournament (also Iran and Serbia); and even moreover, this was the first time Senegal got eliminated from the group stage, despite owning a huge advantage prior to the match against Colombia. The last time as many as three teams failed to get through the group stages despite winning their opener was in 2002 (Argentina, Costa Rica and Russia).

28 June 2018
18:00 SAMT (UTC+4)

Senegal	0–1	Colombia
		Mina 74'

Cosmos Arena, Samara
Attendance: 41,970
Referee: Milorad Mažić (Serbia)

Eighth-finals

The teams had faced each other in five previous matches, including one World Cup group stage match in 1998, a 2–0 England win. Their most recent meeting came in a friendly in 2005, a 3–2 England win.

In the 16th minute, Harry Kane arrived beyond the back post to meet a Kieran Trippier cross, but was unable to direct his header on target. Wílmar Barrios was booked when he appeared to headbutt Jordan Henderson in the build-up to a free-kick Trippier bent narrowly wide. Colombia gave away a penalty early in the second half when Carlos Sánchez dragged Kane down in the box after a corner from the right. Kane scored from 12 yards, shooting down the middle to give England the lead. Colombia forced their way into extra-time, Yerry Mina scoring a downward header from a Juan Cuadrado corner from the right. Eric Dier scored the final penalty in the shoot-out, England came from 3–2 down after Mateus Uribe and Carlos Bacca failed to convert their spot-kicks.

This was the first time that England had won a penalty shoot-out at the FIFA World Cup, and only the second time they had won on penalties at any major tournament (the previous occasion being against Spain at Euro 1996). Kane became the first player to score in six consecutive England appearances since Tommy Lawton did so in 1939. England conceded in injury time at the end of the second half for the first time in World Cup history, with Mina's goal coming after 92 minutes and 33 seconds.

3 July 2018
21:00 MSK (UTC+3)

Colombia	1–1 (a.e.t.)	England
Mina 90+3'		Kane 57' (pen.)
Penalties
Falcao (penalty scored); Ju. Cuadrado (penalty scored); Muriel (penalty scored); Uribe (penalty missed); Bacca (penalty missed)	3–4	(penalty scored) Kane; (penalty scored) Rashford; (penalty missed) Henderson; (penalty scored) Trippier; (penalty scored) Dier

Otkritie Arena, Moscow
Attendance: 44,190
Referee: Mark Geiger (United States)

== Colombia at the 2026 World Cup ==
=== Group K ===
Pos	Team	Pld	W	D	L	GF	GA	GD	Pts	Qualification
1	Colombia	3	2	1	0	4	1	+3	7	Advance to knockout stage
2	Portugal	3	1	2	0	6	1	+5	5	Advance to knockout stage
3	DR Congo	3	1	1	1	4	3	+1	4	Advance to knockout stage
4	Uzbekistan	3	0	0	3	2	11	−9	0	

Source: FIFA
Rules for classification: Group stage tiebreakers
June 17, 2026
8:00 p.m. UTC−6

Uzbekistan	1–3	Colombia
Fayzullaev 60'	(Note: "Uzbekistan vs Colombia | First Stage | FIFA World Cup 2026". FIFA. Retrieved June 18, 2026.; "Match Report – Group K – Uzbekistan v. Colombia". FIFA. June 18, 2026. Retrieved June 18, 2026.; "Post match summary report – Group K – Uzbekistan v. Colombia". FIFA. June 18, 2026. Retrieved June 19, 2026.)	Muñoz 40'; Díaz 65'; Campaz 90+9'

Estadio Azteca, Mexico City
Attendance: 80,824
Referee: Anthony Taylor (England)

June 23, 2026
8:00 p.m. UTC−6

Colombia	1–0	DR Congo
Muñoz 76'	(Note: "Colombia vs Congo DR | First Stage | FIFA World Cup 2026". FIFA. Retrieved June 24, 2026.; "Match Report – Group K – Colombia v. Congo DR". FIFA. June 24, 2026. Retrieved June 24, 2026.; "Post match summary report – Group K – Colombia v. Congo DR". FIFA. June 24, 2026. Retrieved June 25, 2026.)

Estadio Akron, Zapopan
Attendance: 45,358
Referee: Maurizio Mariani (Italy)

June 27, 2026
7:30 p.m. UTC−4

Colombia	0–0	Portugal
	(Note: "Colombia vs Portugal | First Stage | FIFA World Cup 2026". FIFA. Retrieved June 28, 2026.; "Match Report – Group K – Colombia v. Portugal". FIFA. June 28, 2026. Retrieved June 28, 2026.; "Post match summary report – Group K – Colombia v. Portugal". FIFA. June 28, 2026. Retrieved June 28, 2026.)

Hard Rock Stadium, Miami Gardens
Attendance: 64,478
Referee: Alireza Faghani (Australia)

=== Knockout stage ===
Round of 32

July 3, 2026
8:30 p.m. UTC−5

Colombia	1–0	Ghana
J. Arias 14'	(Note: "Colombia vs Ghana | Round of 32 | FIFA World Cup 2026". FIFA. July 4, 2026. Retrieved July 4, 2026.; "Match Report – Round of 32 – Colombia v. Ghana". FIFA. July 4, 2026. Retrieved July 4, 2026.; "Post match summary report – Round of 32 – Colombia v. Ghana". FIFA. July 3, 2026. Retrieved July 4, 2026.)

Arrowhead Stadium, Kansas City
Attendance: 69,045
Referee: Clément Turpin (France)

Round of 16

July 7, 2026
1:00 p.m. UTC−7

Switzerland	0–0 (a.e.t.)	Colombia
	(Note: "Switzerland vs Colombia | Round of 16 | FIFA World Cup 2026". FIFA. Retrieved July 7, 2026.; "Match Report – Round of 16 – Switzerland v. Colombia". FIFA. July 7, 2026. Retrieved July 7, 2026.; "Post match summary report – Round of 16 – Switzerland v. Colombia". FIFA. July 7, 2026. Retrieved July 9, 2026.)
Penalties
Xhaka (penalty scored); Amdouni (penalty scored); Akanji (penalty missed); Itten (penalty scored); Vargas (penalty scored)	4–3	(penalty scored) Quintero; (penalty missed) Sánchez; (penalty scored) Campaz; (penalty missed) Hernández; (penalty scored) Díaz

BC Place, Vancouver
Attendance: 52,497
Referee: Iván Barton (El Salvador)

== Squads ==
=== 1962 World Cup ===
Head coach: (Argentina) Adolfo Pedernera

No.	Pos.	Player	Date of birth (age)	Caps	Club
1	GK	Efraín Sánchez (c)	27 February 1926 (aged 36)		(Colombia) Independiente Medellín
2	GK	Achito Vivas	1 March 1934 (aged 28)		(Colombia) Deportivo Pereira
3	DF	Francisco Zuluaga	4 February 1929 (aged 33)		(Colombia) Independiente Santa Fe
4	DF	Aníbal Alzate	31 January 1933 (aged 29)		(Colombia) Deportes Tolima
5	DF	Jaime González	1 April 1938 (aged 24)		(Colombia) América de Cali
6	DF	Ignacio Calle	21 August 1931 (aged 30)		(Colombia) Atlético Nacional
7	DF	Carlos Aponte	24 January 1939 (aged 23)		(Colombia) Independiente Santa Fe
8	DF	Héctor Echeverry	10 April 1938 (aged 24)		(Colombia) Independiente Medellín
9	MF	Jaime Silva	10 October 1935 (aged 26)		(Colombia) Independiente Santa Fe
10	MF	Rolando Serrano	13 November 1938 (aged 23)		(Colombia) América de Cali
11	DF	Óscar López	2 April 1939 (aged 23)		(Colombia) Once Caldas
12	MF	Hernando Tovar	7 June 1938 (aged 23)		(Colombia) Independiente Santa Fe
13	FW	Germán Aceros	30 September 1938 (aged 23)		(Colombia) Deportivo Cali
14	FW	Luis Paz	25 June 1942 (aged 19)		(Colombia) América de Cali
15	MF	Marcos Coll	23 August 1935 (aged 26)		(Colombia) América de Cali
16	FW	Ignacio Pérez	19 December 1934 (aged 27)		(Colombia) Once Caldas
17	FW	Marino Klinger	7 February 1936 (aged 26)		(Colombia) Millonarios
18	FW	Eusebio Escobar	2 July 1936 (aged 25)		(Colombia) Deportivo Pereira
19	FW	Delio Gamboa	28 January 1936 (aged 26)		(Colombia) Millonarios
20	FW	Antonio Rada	13 June 1937 (aged 24)		(Colombia) Deportivo Pereira
21	FW	Héctor González	7 July 1937 (aged 24)		(Colombia) Independiente Santa Fe
22	FW	Jairo Arias	2 November 1938 (aged 23)		(Colombia) Atlético Nacional

=== 1990 World Cup ===
Head coach: (Colombia) Francisco Maturana

No.	Pos.	Player	Date of birth (age)	Caps	Club
1	GK	René Higuita	27 August 1966 (aged 23)		(Colombia) Atlético Nacional
2	DF	Andrés Escobar	13 March 1967 (aged 23)		(Switzerland) Young Boys
3	DF	Gildardo Gómez	13 October 1963 (aged 26)		(Colombia) Atlético Nacional
4	DF	Luis Fernando Herrera	12 June 1962 (aged 27)		(Colombia) Atlético Nacional
5	FW	León Villa	12 January 1960 (aged 30)		(Colombia) Atlético Nacional
6	DF	José Ricardo Pérez	24 October 1963 (aged 26)		(Colombia) Atlético Nacional
7	FW	Carlos Estrada	1 November 1961 (aged 28)		(Colombia) Millonarios
8	MF	Gabriel Gómez	8 December 1959 (aged 30)		(Colombia) Independiente Medellín
9	FW	Miguel Guerrero	7 September 1967 (aged 22)		(Colombia) América de Cali
10	MF	Carlos Valderrama (c)	2 September 1961 (aged 28)		(France) Montpellier
11	MF	Bernardo Redín	26 February 1963 (aged 27)		(Colombia) Deportivo Cali
12	GK	Eduardo Niño	8 August 1967 (aged 22)		(Colombia) Independiente Santa Fe
13	DF	Carlos Hoyos	28 February 1962 (aged 28)		(Colombia) Atlético Junior
14	MF	Leonel Álvarez	29 July 1965 (aged 24)		(Colombia) Atlético Nacional
15	DF	Luis Carlos Perea	29 December 1963 (aged 26)		(Colombia) Atlético Nacional
16	FW	Arnoldo Iguarán	18 January 1957 (aged 33)		(Colombia) Millonarios
17	DF	Geovanis Cassiani	10 January 1970 (aged 20)		(Colombia) Millonarios
18	DF	Wilmer Cabrera	15 September 1967 (aged 22)		(Colombia) América de Cali
19	MF	Freddy Rincón	14 August 1966 (aged 23)		(Colombia) América de Cali
20	MF	Luis Fajardo	18 August 1963 (aged 26)		(Colombia) Atlético Nacional
21	DF	Alexis Mendoza	8 November 1961 (aged 28)		(Colombia) Atlético Junior
22	FW	Rubén Darío Hernández	19 February 1965 (aged 25)		(Colombia) Millonarios

=== 1994 World Cup ===
Head coach: (Colombia) Francisco Maturana

No.	Pos.	Player	Date of birth (age)	Caps	Club
1	GK	Óscar Córdoba	3 February 1970 (aged 24)		(Colombia) América de Cali
2	DF	Andrés Escobar	13 March 1967 (aged 27)		(Colombia) Atlético Nacional
3	DF	Alexis Mendoza	8 November 1961 (aged 32)		(Colombia) Atlético Junior
4	DF	Luis Fernando Herrera	12 June 1962 (aged 32)		(Colombia) Atlético Nacional
5	MF	Hernán Gaviria	27 November 1969 (aged 24)		(Colombia) Atlético Nacional
6	MF	Gabriel Gómez	8 December 1959 (aged 34)		(Colombia) Atlético Nacional
7	FW	Antony de Ávila	21 December 1962 (aged 31)		(Colombia) América de Cali
8	MF	John Harold Lozano	30 March 1972 (aged 22)		(Colombia) América de Cali
9	FW	Iván Valenciano	18 March 1972 (aged 22)		(Colombia) Atlético Junior
10	MF	Carlos Valderrama (c)	2 September 1961 (aged 32)		(Colombia) Atlético Junior
11	FW	Adolfo Valencia	6 February 1968 (aged 26)		(Germany) Bayern Munich
12	GK	Farid Mondragón	21 June 1971 (aged 22)		(Argentina) Argentinos Juniors
13	DF	Néstor Ortiz	20 September 1968 (aged 25)		(Colombia) Once Caldas
14	MF	Leonel Álvarez	29 July 1965 (aged 28)		(Colombia) América de Cali
15	DF	Luis Carlos Perea	29 December 1963 (aged 30)		(Colombia) Atlético Junior
16	FW	Víctor Aristizábal	9 December 1971 (aged 22)		(Colombia) Atlético Nacional
17	MF	Mauricio Serna	22 January 1968 (aged 26)		(Colombia) Atlético Nacional
18	DF	Óscar Cortés	19 October 1968 (aged 25)		(Colombia) Millonarios
19	MF	Freddy Rincón	14 August 1966 (aged 27)		(Brazil) Palmeiras
20	DF	Wilson Pérez	6 August 1967 (aged 26)		(Colombia) América de Cali
21	FW	Faustino Asprilla	10 November 1969 (aged 24)		(Italy) Parma
22	GK	José María Pazo	4 April 1964 (aged 30)		(Colombia) Atlético Junior

=== 1998 World Cup ===
Head coach: (Colombia) Hernán Darío Gómez

No.	Pos.	Player	Date of birth (age)	Caps	Club
1	GK	Óscar Córdoba	3 February 1970 (aged 28)		(Argentina) Boca Juniors
2	DF	Iván Córdoba	11 August 1976 (aged 21)		(Argentina) San Lorenzo
3	DF	Ever Palacios	18 January 1969 (aged 29)		(Colombia) Deportivo Cali
4	DF	José Santa	12 November 1970 (aged 27)		(Colombia) Atlético Nacional
5	DF	Jorge Bermúdez	18 June 1971 (aged 26)		(Argentina) Boca Juniors
6	MF	Mauricio Serna	22 January 1968 (aged 30)		(Argentina) Boca Juniors
7	FW	Antony de Ávila	21 December 1962 (aged 35)		(Ecuador) Barcelona
8	MF	John Harold Lozano	30 March 1972 (aged 26)		(Spain) Real Valladolid
9	FW	Adolfo Valencia	6 February 1968 (aged 30)		(Colombia) Independiente Medellín
10	MF	Carlos Valderrama (c)	2 September 1961 (aged 36)		(United States) Miami Fusion
11	FW	Faustino Asprilla	10 November 1969 (aged 28)		(Italy) Parma
12	GK	Miguel Calero	14 April 1971 (aged 27)		(Colombia) Atlético Nacional
13	DF	Wilmer Cabrera	15 September 1967 (aged 30)		(Colombia) Millonarios
14	MF	Jorge Bolaño	28 April 1977 (aged 21)		(Colombia) Atlético Junior
15	FW	Víctor Aristizábal	9 December 1971 (aged 26)		(Brazil) São Paulo
16	DF	Luis Antonio Moreno	25 December 1970 (aged 27)		(Colombia) Deportes Tolima
17	MF	Andrés Estrada	12 November 1967 (aged 30)		(Colombia) Deportivo Cali
18	MF	John Wilmar Pérez	2 February 1970 (aged 28)		(Colombia) Deportivo Cali
19	MF	Freddy Rincón	14 August 1966 (aged 31)		(Brazil) Corinthians
20	FW	Hamilton Ricard	12 January 1974 (aged 24)		(England) Middlesbrough
21	FW	Léider Preciado	26 February 1977 (aged 21)		(Colombia) Santa Fe
22	GK	Farid Mondragón	21 June 1971 (aged 26)		(Argentina) Independiente

=== 2014 World Cup ===
Head coach: (Argentina) José Pékerman

No.	Pos.	Player	Date of birth (age)	Caps	Club
1	GK	David Ospina	31 August 1988 (aged 25)	44	(France) Nice
2	DF	Cristián Zapata	30 September 1986 (aged 27)	24	(Italy) Milan
3	DF	Mario Yepes (c)	13 January 1976 (aged 38)	98	(Italy) Atalanta
4	DF	Santiago Arias	13 January 1992 (aged 22)	6	(Netherlands) PSV
5	MF	Carlos Carbonero	25 July 1990 (aged 23)	1	(Argentina) River Plate
6	MF	Carlos Sánchez	6 February 1986 (aged 28)	44	(Spain) Elche
7	DF	Pablo Armero	2 November 1986 (aged 27)	53	(England) West Ham United
8	MF	Abel Aguilar	6 January 1985 (aged 29)	49	(France) Toulouse
9	FW	Teófilo Gutiérrez	17 May 1985 (aged 29)	30	(Argentina) River Plate
10	MF	James Rodríguez	12 July 1991 (aged 22)	22	(France) Monaco
11	MF	Juan Cuadrado	26 May 1988 (aged 26)	28	(Italy) Fiorentina
12	GK	Camilo Vargas	9 March 1989 (aged 25)	0	(Colombia) Santa Fe
13	MF	Fredy Guarín	30 June 1986 (aged 27)	49	(Italy) Internazionale
14	FW	Víctor Ibarbo	19 May 1990 (aged 24)	9	(Italy) Cagliari
15	MF	Alexander Mejía	11 July 1988 (aged 25)	8	(Colombia) Atlético Nacional
16	DF	Éder Álvarez Balanta	28 February 1993 (aged 21)	3	(Argentina) River Plate
17	FW	Carlos Bacca	8 September 1986 (aged 27)	11	(Spain) Sevilla
18	DF	Juan Camilo Zúñiga	14 December 1985 (aged 28)	50	(Italy) Napoli
19	FW	Adrián Ramos	22 January 1986 (aged 28)	26	(Germany) Hertha BSC
20	MF	Juan Quintero	18 January 1993 (aged 21)	4	(Portugal) Porto
21	FW	Jackson Martínez	3 October 1986 (aged 27)	27	(Portugal) Porto
22	GK	Faryd Mondragón	21 June 1971 (aged 43)	50	(Colombia) Deportivo Cali
23	DF	Carlos Valdés	22 May 1985 (aged 29)	14	(Argentina) San Lorenzo

=== 2018 FIFA World Cup ===
Head coach: (Argentina) José Pékerman

No.	Pos.	Player	Date of birth (age)	Caps	Goals	Club
1	GK	David Ospina	31 August 1988 (aged 29)	86	0	(The Football Association) Arsenal
2	DF	Cristián Zapata	30 September 1986 (aged 31)	55	2	(Italian Football Federation) Milan
3	DF	Óscar Murillo	18 April 1988 (aged 30)	13	0	(Mexican Football Federation) Pachuca
4	DF	Santiago Arias	13 January 1992 (aged 26)	41	0	(Royal Dutch Football Association) PSV Eindhoven
5	MF	Wílmar Barrios	16 October 1993 (aged 24)	10	0	(Argentine Football Association) Boca Juniors
6	MF	Carlos Sánchez	6 February 1986 (aged 32)	85	0	(Royal Spanish Football Federation) Espanyol
7	FW	Carlos Bacca	8 September 1986 (aged 31)	45	14	(Royal Spanish Football Federation) Villarreal
8	MF	Abel Aguilar	6 January 1985 (aged 33)	70	7	(Colombian Football Federation) Deportivo Cali
9	FW	Radamel Falcao (captain)	10 February 1986 (aged 32)	73	29	(French Football Federation) Monaco
10	MF	James Rodríguez	12 July 1991 (aged 26)	63	21	(German Football Association) Bayern Munich
11	MF	Juan Cuadrado	26 May 1988 (aged 30)	70	7	(Italian Football Federation) Juventus
12	GK	Camilo Vargas	9 March 1989 (aged 29)	5	0	(Colombian Football Federation) Deportivo Cali
13	DF	Yerry Mina	23 September 1994 (aged 23)	12	3	(Royal Spanish Football Federation) Barcelona
14	FW	Luis Muriel	16 April 1991 (aged 27)	18	2	(Royal Spanish Football Federation) Sevilla
15	MF	Mateus Uribe	21 March 1991 (aged 27)	8	0	(Mexican Football Federation) América
16	MF	Jefferson Lerma	25 October 1994 (aged 23)	5	0	(Royal Spanish Football Federation) Levante
17	DF	Johan Mojica	21 August 1992 (aged 25)	4	1	(Royal Spanish Football Federation) Girona
18	DF	Farid Díaz	20 July 1983 (aged 34)	13	0	(Paraguayan Football Association) Olimpia
19	FW	Miguel Borja	26 January 1993 (aged 25)	7	2	(Brazilian Football Confederation) Palmeiras
20	MF	Juan Fernando Quintero	18 January 1993 (aged 25)	15	2	(Argentine Football Association) River Plate
21	FW	José Izquierdo	7 July 1992 (aged 25)	5	1	(The Football Association) Brighton & Hove Albion
22	GK	José Fernando Cuadrado	1 June 1985 (aged 33)	1	0	(Colombian Football Federation) Once Caldas
23	DF	Davinson Sánchez	12 June 1996 (aged 22)	9	0	(The Football Association) Tottenham Hotspur

=== 2026 FIFA World Cup ===
Coach: (Argentina) Néstor Lorenzo

No.	Pos.	Player	Date of birth (age)	Caps	Goals	Club
1	GK	David Ospina	August 31, 1988 (aged 37)	130	0	(Colombian Football Federation) Atlético Nacional
2	DF	Daniel Muñoz	May 26, 1996 (aged 30)	46	3	(The Football Association) Crystal Palace
3	DF	Jhon Lucumí	June 26, 1998 (aged 27)	37	1	(Italian Football Federation) Bologna
4	DF	Santiago Arias	January 13, 1992 (aged 34)	68	0	(Argentine Football Association) Independiente
5	MF	Kevin Castaño	September 29, 2000 (aged 25)	25	0	(Argentine Football Association) River Plate
6	MF	Richard Ríos	June 2, 2000 (aged 26)	32	2	(Portuguese Football Federation) Benfica
7	FW	Luis Díaz	January 13, 1997 (aged 29)	74	22	(German Football Association) Bayern Munich
8	MF	Jorge Carrascal	May 25, 1998 (aged 28)	24	2	(Brazilian Football Confederation) Flamengo
9	FW	Jhon Córdoba	May 11, 1993 (aged 33)	21	6	(Russian Football Union) Krasnodar
10	MF	James Rodríguez (captain)	July 12, 1991 (aged 34)	126	31	(United States Soccer Federation) Minnesota United FC
11	MF	Jhon Arias	September 21, 1997 (aged 28)	38	6	(Brazilian Football Confederation) Palmeiras
12	GK	Camilo Vargas	March 9, 1989 (aged 37)	42	0	(Mexican Football Federation) Atlas
13	DF	Yerry Mina	September 23, 1994 (aged 31)	54	8	(Italian Football Federation) Cagliari
14	DF	Gustavo Puerta	July 23, 2003 (aged 22)	6	1	(Royal Spanish Football Federation) Racing Santander
15	MF	Juan Portilla	September 12, 1998 (aged 27)	10	0	(Brazilian Football Confederation) Athletico Paranaense
16	MF	Jefferson Lerma	October 25, 1994 (aged 31)	65	5	(The Football Association) Crystal Palace
17	DF	Johan Mojica	August 21, 1992 (aged 33)	45	1	(Royal Spanish Football Federation) Mallorca
18	DF	Willer Ditta	January 23, 1998 (aged 28)	5	0	(Mexican Football Federation) Cruz Azul
19	FW	Cucho Hernández	April 20, 1999 (aged 27)	9	2	(Royal Spanish Football Federation) Real Betis
20	MF	Juan Fernando Quintero	January 18, 1993 (aged 33)	49	6	(Argentine Football Association) River Plate
21	FW	Jaminton Campaz	May 24, 2000 (aged 26)	10	1	(Argentine Football Association) Rosario Central
22	DF	Deiver Machado	September 2, 1993 (aged 32)	15	0	(French Football Federation) Nantes
23	DF	Davinson Sánchez	June 12, 1996 (aged 29)	79	4	(Turkish Football Federation) Galatasaray
24	GK	Álvaro Montero	March 29, 1995 (aged 31)	12	0	(Argentine Football Association) Vélez Sarsfield
25	FW	Luis Suárez	December 2, 1997 (aged 28)	12	5	(Portuguese Football Federation) Sporting CP
26	FW	Andrés Gómez	September 12, 2002 (aged 23)	8	2	(Brazilian Football Confederation) Vasco da Gama

== Record players ==
Rank	Player	Matches	World Cups
1	James Rodríguez	13	2014, 2018 and 2026
2	Juan Fernando Quintero	11	2014, 2018 and 2026
3	Freddy Rincón	10	1990, 1994 and 1998
3	Carlos Valderrama	10	1990, 1994 and 1998
5	Juan Cuadrado	9	2014 and 2018
5	David Ospina	9	2014, 2018 and 2026
5	Jefferson Lerma	9	2018 and 2026
5	Davinson Sánchez	9	2018 and 2026
9	Santiago Arias	8	2014, 2018 and 2026
9	Johan Mojica	8	2018 and 2026

Current as of 7 July 2026, after the match v Switzerland

== Goalscorers ==
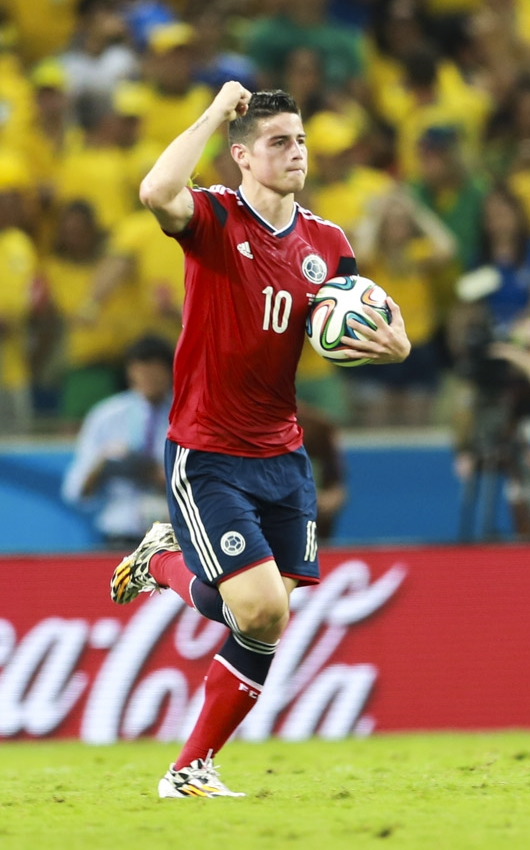
James Rodríguez after scoring his sixth goal in the 2014 FIFA World Cup, a quarter-final penalty against Brazil. Although Colombia was eliminated, it won him the Golden Boot as most successful scorer of the tournament.

On 30 May 1962, Francisco Zuluaga made history by scoring Colombia's first-ever FIFA World Cup goal, doing so in their opening match against Uruguay in Arica.

Colombia's record World Cup scorer, James Rodríguez, also won the Golden Boot after scoring six goals during the 2014 World Cup.

Player	Goals	1962	1990	1994	1998	2014	2018	2026
James Rodríguez	6					6		
Yerry Mina	3						3	
Bernardo Redín	2		2					
Adolfo Valencia	2			2				
Jackson Martínez	2					2		
Juan Fernando Quintero	2					1	1	
Juan Guillermo Cuadrado	2					1	1	
Daniel Muñoz	2							2
Francisco Zuluaga	1	1						
Germán Aceros	1	1						
Marcos Coll	1	1						
Antonio Rada	1	1						
Marino Klinger	1	1						
Carlos Valderrama	1		1					
Freddy Rincón	1		1					
Hernán Gaviria	1			1				
John Harold Lozano	1			1				
Léider Preciado	1				1			
Pablo Armero	1					1		
Teófilo Gutiérrez	1					1		
Radamel Falcao	1						1	
Luis Díaz	1							1
Jaminton Campaz	1							1
Jhon Arias	1							1
Total	37	5	4	4	1	12	6	5

Own goals scored for opponents

- Andrés Escobar (scored for the United States in 1994)

Current as of 7 July 2026, after the match v Switzerland

== Awards and records ==
Team Awards

- FIFA Fair Play Trophy 2014

Individual Awards

- Golden Boot 2014: James Rodríguez

Records

- Only tournament goal directly from a corner: Marcos Coll (1962 v USSR)

== See also ==
- Colombia at the CONCACAF Gold Cup
- Colombia at the Copa América
- Colombia at the FIFA Confederations Cup
- South American nations at the FIFA World Cup
