= Uruguay at the FIFA World Cup =

International football delegation

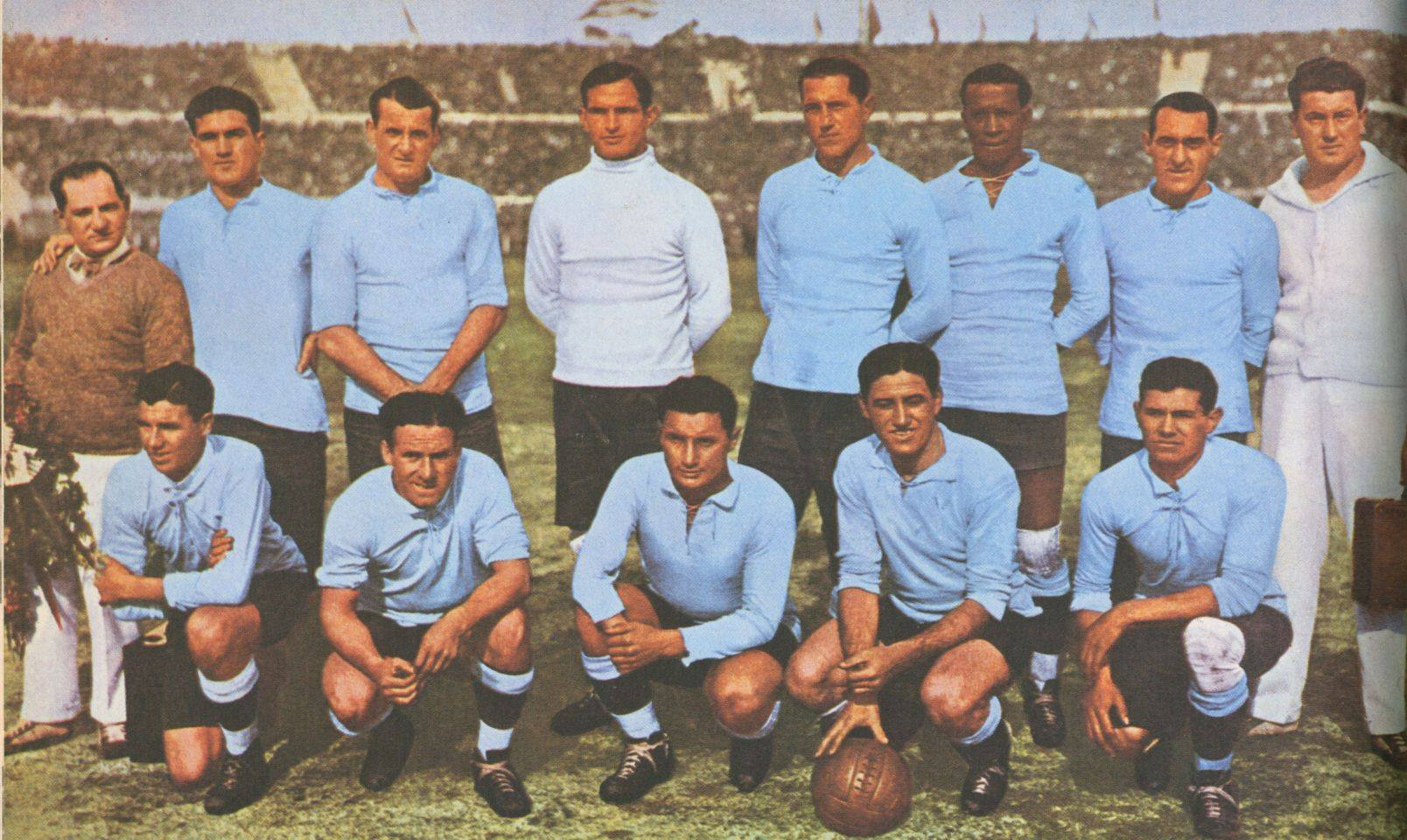
The Uruguay lineup that won the 1930 FIFA World Cup

This is a record of Uruguay's results at the FIFA World Cup. Uruguay have won four FIFA-organized World Football Championships. They won the first World Championship organized by FIFA under the Olympic Committee umbrella with true representation from all continents; before then, football in the Olympics comprised only European teams. Uruguay then won the next two World Cups (Jules Rimet Trophy) in which they participated; these tournaments, the 1930 and 1950 FIFA World Cups, were fully independent from the Olympics and employed clear rules distinguishing professional and amateur football players. Since 1924 was the beginning of true international football competition, organized by FIFA, FIFA recognizes Uruguay as two time world champions and allows the team to wear two stars on their uniforms during official international football competitions. (Before 1974, the FIFA World Cup was referred to as the Football World Championship, and the nine champions from 1930 to 1970 received replicas of the Jules Rimet Trophy.) Uruguay hosted and won the first FIFA World Cup in 1930, beating Argentina 4–2 in the final. They won their second and most recent title in 1950, upsetting host Brazil 2–1 in the final match.

In total, Uruguay have qualified for fifteen World Cups, reaching the second round in ten, the semi-finals five times, and the final twice. They also won the gold medal in Olympic football twice, in 1924 and 1928, before the creation of the World Cup. Uruguay won the 1980 Mundialito, a tournament comprising former World Cup champions hosted in Uruguay to celebrate the 50th anniversary of the first World Championship. Uruguay is one of the most successful teams in the world, having won twenty FIFA official titles: two World Cups, two Olympic Games, fifteen Copa América championships, and the 1980 World Champions' Gold Cup.

Uruguay refused to participate in 1934 and defend their title because many European nations declined to take part in 1930 held in Uruguay. They also refused to enter in 1938 because FIFA's decision to hold the tournament in France caused outrage in South America where it was believed that the venue would alternate between the two continents.

== Record at the FIFA World Cup ==
=== Overall record ===
| Year | Round | Position | Pld | W | D* | L | GF | GA |
|---|---|---|---|---|---|---|---|---|
| (Uruguay) 1930 | Champions | 1st | 4 | 4 | 0 | 0 | 15 | 3 |
| (Italy) 1934 | Refused to participate | | | | | | | |
| (France) 1938 | Refused to participate | | | | | | | |
| (Brazil) 1950 | Champions | 1st | 4 | 3 | 1 | 0 | 15 | 5 |
| (Switzerland) 1954 | Fourth place | 4th | 5 | 3 | 0 | 2 | 16 | 9 |
| (Sweden) 1958 | Did not qualify | | | | | | | |
| (Chile) 1962 | Group stage | 13th | 3 | 1 | 0 | 2 | 4 | 6 |
| (England) 1966 | Quarter-finals | 7th | 4 | 1 | 2 | 1 | 2 | 5 |
| (Mexico) 1970 | Fourth place | 4th | 6 | 2 | 1 | 3 | 4 | 5 |
| (West Germany) 1974 | Group stage | 13th | 3 | 0 | 1 | 2 | 1 | 6 |
| (Argentina) 1978 | Did not qualify | | | | | | | |
| (Spain) 1982 | Did not qualify | | | | | | | |
| (Mexico) 1986 | Round of 16 | 16th | 4 | 0 | 2 | 2 | 2 | 8 |
| (Italy) 1990 | Round of 16 | 16th | 4 | 1 | 1 | 2 | 2 | 5 |
| (United States) 1994 | Did not qualify | | | | | | | |
| (France) 1998 | Did not qualify | | | | | | | |
| (South Korea) (Japan) 2002 | Group stage | 26th | 3 | 0 | 2 | 1 | 4 | 5 |
| (Germany) 2006 | Did not qualify | | | | | | | |
| (South Africa) 2010 | Fourth place | 4th | 7 | 3 | 2 | 2 | 11 | 8 |
| (Brazil) 2014 | Round of 16 | 12th | 4 | 2 | 0 | 2 | 4 | 6 |
| (Russia) 2018 | Quarter-finals | 5th | 5 | 4 | 0 | 1 | 7 | 3 |
| (Qatar) 2022 | Group stage | 20th | 3 | 1 | 1 | 1 | 2 | 2 |
| (Canada) (Mexico) (United States) 2026 | Group stage | 37th | 3 | 0 | 2 | 1 | 3 | 4 |
| (Morocco) (Portugal) (Spain) 2030 | Qualified as centenary co-hosts | | | | | | | |
| (Saudi Arabia) 2034 | To be determined | | | | | | | |
| Total | 15/23 | 2 Titles | 62 | 25 | 15 | 22 | 92 | 80 |

*Draws include knockout matches decided via penalty shoot-out.

Uruguay's World Cup record
| First Match | Uruguay 1–0 Peru (18 July 1930; Montevideo, Uruguay) |
| Biggest Win | Uruguay 8–0 Bolivia (2 July 1950; Belo Horizonte, Brazil) |
| Biggest Defeat | Denmark 6–1 Uruguay (8 June 1986; Nezahualcóyotl, Mexico) |
| Best Result | Champions in 1930 and 1950 |
| Worst Result | Group stage in 1962, 1974, 2002, 2022, and 2026 |

=== By match ===
List of FIFA World Cup matches
| Year | Round | Opponent | Score | Result |
|---|---|---|---|---|
| 1930 | Group stage | Peru | 1–0 | Win |
| 1930 | Group stage | Romania | 4–0 | Win |
| 1930 | Semi-final | Yugoslavia | 6–1 | Win |
| 1930 | Final | Argentina | 4–2 | Win |
| 1950 | Group stage | Bolivia | 8–0 | Win |
| 1950 | Final round | Spain | 2–2 | Draw |
| 1950 | Final round | Sweden | 3–2 | Win |
| 1950 | Final round | Brazil | 2–1 | Win |
| 1954 | Group stage | Czechoslovakia | 2–0 | Win |
| 1954 | Group stage | Scotland | 7–0 | Win |
| 1954 | Quarter-final | England | 4–2 | Win |
| 1954 | Semi-final | Hungary | 2–4 (a.e.t.) | Loss |
| 1954 | Match for third place | Austria | 1–3 | Loss |
| 1962 | Group stage | Colombia | 2–1 | Win |
| 1962 | Group stage | Yugoslavia | 1–3 | Loss |
| 1962 | Group stage | Soviet Union | 1–2 | Loss |
| 1966 | Group stage | England | 0–0 | Draw |
| 1966 | Group stage | France | 2–1 | Win |
| 1966 | Group stage | Mexico | 0–0 | Draw |
| 1966 | Quarter-final | West Germany | 0–4 | Loss |
| 1970 | Group stage | Israel | 2–0 | Win |
| 1970 | Group stage | Italy | 0–0 | Draw |
| 1970 | Group stage | Sweden | 0–1 | Loss |
| 1970 | Quarter-final | Soviet Union | 1–0 (a.e.t.) | Win |
| 1970 | Semi-final | Brazil | 1–3 | Loss |
| 1970 | Match for third place | West Germany | 0–1 | Loss |
| 1974 | Group stage | Netherlands | 0–2 | Loss |
| 1974 | Group stage | Bulgaria | 1–1 | Draw |
| 1974 | Group stage | Sweden | 0–3 | Loss |
| 1986 | Group stage | West Germany | 1–1 | Draw |
| 1986 | Group stage | Denmark | 1–6 | Loss |
| 1986 | Group stage | Scotland | 0–0 | Draw |
| 1986 | Round of 16 | Argentina | 0–1 | Loss |
| 1990 | Group stage | Spain | 0–0 | Draw |
| 1990 | Group stage | Belgium | 1–3 | Loss |
| 1990 | Group stage | South Korea | 1–0 | Win |
| 1990 | Round of 16 | Italy | 0–2 | Loss |
| 2002 | Group stage | Denmark | 1–2 | Loss |
| 2002 | Group stage | France | 0–0 | Draw |
| 2002 | Group stage | Senegal | 3–3 | Draw |
| 2010 | Group stage | France | 0–0 | Draw |
| 2010 | Group stage | South Africa | 3–0 | Win |
| 2010 | Group stage | Mexico | 1–0 | Win |
| 2010 | Round of 16 | South Korea | 2–1 | Win |
| 2010 | Quarter-final | Ghana | 1–1 (a.e.t.) (4–2 p) | Draw |
| 2010 | Semi-final | Netherlands | 2–3 | Loss |
| 2010 | Match for third place | Germany | 2–3 | Loss |
| 2014 | Group stage | Costa Rica | 1–3 | Loss |
| 2014 | Group stage | England | 2–1 | Win |
| 2014 | Group stage | Italy | 1–0 | Win |
| 2014 | Round of 16 | Colombia | 0–2 | Loss |
| 2018 | Group stage | Egypt | 1–0 | Win |
| 2018 | Group stage | Saudi Arabia | 1–0 | Win |
| 2018 | Group stage | Russia | 3–0 | Win |
| 2018 | Round of 16 | Portugal | 2–1 | Win |
| 2018 | Quarter-final | France | 0–2 | Loss |
| 2022 | Group stage | South Korea | 0–0 | Draw |
| 2022 | Group stage | Portugal | 0–2 | Loss |
| 2022 | Group stage | Ghana | 2–0 | Win |
| 2026 | Group stage | Saudi Arabia | 1–1 | Draw |
| 2026 | Group stage | Cape Verde | 2–2 | Draw |
| 2026 | Group stage | Spain | 0–1 | Loss |
| 2030 | Group stage | TBA | v | |
| 2030 | Group stage | TBA | v | |
| 2030 | Group stage | TBA | v | |

== Uruguay 1930 ==
| Team | Pld | W | D | L | GF | GA | GD | Pts |
|---|---|---|---|---|---|---|---|---|
| Uruguay | 2 | 2 | 0 | 0 | 5 | 0 | +5 | 4 |
| Romania | 2 | 1 | 0 | 1 | 3 | 5 | –2 | 2 |
| Peru | 2 | 0 | 0 | 2 | 1 | 4 | –3 | 0 |

18 July 1930
14:30 UYT (UTC−03:30)

| Uruguay | 1–0 | Peru |
|---|---|---|
| Castro 65' | Report |

Estadio Centenario, Montevideo
Attendance: 70,000
Referee: John Langenus (Belgium)

21 July 1930
14:50 UYT (UTC−03:30)

| Uruguay | 4–0 | Romania |
|---|---|---|
| Dorado 7'; Scarone 26'; Anselmo 31'; Cea 35' | Report |

Estadio Centenario, Montevideo
Attendance: 80,000
Referee: Gilberto de Almeida Rêgo (Brazil)

=== Semi-finals ===
27 July 1930
14:45 UYT (UTC−03:30)

| Uruguay | 6–1 | Yugoslavia |
|---|---|---|
| Cea 18', 67', 72'; Anselmo 20', 31'; Iriarte 61' | Report | Sekulić 4' |

Estadio Centenario, Montevideo
Attendance: 93,000
Referee: Gilberto de Almeida Rêgo (Brazil)

=== Final ===
30 July 1930
15:30 UYT (UTC−03:30)

| Uruguay | 4–2 | Argentina |
|---|---|---|
| Dorado 12'; Cea 57'; Iriarte 68'; Castro 89' | Report | Peucelle 20'; Stábile 37' |

Estadio Centenario, Montevideo
Attendance: 93,000
Referee: John Langenus (Belgium)

== Brazil 1950 ==
| Team | Pld | W | D | L | GF | GA | Pts |
|---|---|---|---|---|---|---|---|
| Uruguay | 1 | 1 | 0 | 0 | 8 | 0 | 2 |
| Bolivia | 1 | 0 | 0 | 1 | 0 | 8 | 0 |
| Scotland | withdrew | | | | | | |
| Turkey | withdrew | | | | | | |

2 July 1950
18:00 BRT (UTC−03)

| Uruguay | 8–0 | Bolivia |
|---|---|---|
| Míguez 14', 40', 51'; Schiaffino 17', 53'; Vidal 18'; Pérez 83'; Ghiggia 87' | Report |

Estádio Independência, Belo Horizonte
Attendance: ~5,000
Referee: George Reader (England)

=== Final round ===
| Team | Pld | W | D | L | GF | GA | Pts |
|---|---|---|---|---|---|---|---|
| Uruguay | 3 | 2 | 1 | 0 | 7 | 5 | 5 |
| Brazil | 3 | 2 | 0 | 1 | 14 | 4 | 4 |
| Sweden | 3 | 1 | 0 | 2 | 6 | 11 | 2 |
| Spain | 3 | 0 | 1 | 2 | 4 | 11 | 1 |

9 July 1950
15:00 BRT (UTC−03)

| Uruguay | 2–2 | Spain |
|---|---|---|
| Ghiggia 27'; Varela 72' | Report | Basora 39', 41' |

Estádio do Pacaembu, São Paulo
Attendance: ~44,000
Referee: Benjamin Griffiths (Wales)

13 July 1950
15:00 BRT (UTC−03)

| Uruguay | 3–2 | Sweden |
|---|---|---|
| Ghiggia 39'; Míguez 77', 84' | Report | Palmér 4'; Sundqvist 41' |

Estádio do Pacaembu, São Paulo
Attendance: ~8,000
Referee: Giovanni Galeati (Italy)

16 July 1950
15:00 BRT (UTC−03)

| Uruguay | 2–1 | Brazil |
|---|---|---|
| Schiaffino 66'; Ghiggia 79' | Report | Friaça 47' |

Estádio do Maracanã, Rio de Janeiro
Attendance: ~200,000
Referee: George Reader (England)

== Switzerland 1954 ==
| Team | Pld | W | D | L | GF | GA | Pts |
|---|---|---|---|---|---|---|---|
| Uruguay | 2 | 2 | 0 | 0 | 9 | 0 | 4 |
| Austria | 2 | 2 | 0 | 0 | 6 | 0 | 4 |
| Czechoslovakia | 2 | 0 | 0 | 2 | 0 | 7 | 0 |
| Scotland | 2 | 0 | 0 | 2 | 0 | 8 | 0 |

16 June 1954
18:00 CET (UTC+01)

| Uruguay | 2–0 | Czechoslovakia |
|---|---|---|
| Míguez 72'; Schiaffino 81' | Report |

Wankdorf Stadium, Bern
Attendance: 20,500
Referee: Arthur Edward Ellis (England)

19 June 1954
16:50 CET (UTC+01)

| Uruguay | 7–0 | Scotland |
|---|---|---|
| Borges 17', 47', 57'; Míguez 30', 83'; Abbadie 54', 85' | Report |

St. Jakob Stadium, Basel
Attendance: 43,000
Referee: Vincenzo Orlandini (Italy)

=== Quarter-final ===
26 June 1954
17:00 CET (UTC+01)

| Uruguay | 4–2 | England |
|---|---|---|
| Borges 5'; Varela 39'; Schiaffino 46'; Ambrois 78' | Report | Lofthouse 16'; Finney 67' |

St. Jakob Stadium, Basel
Attendance: 35,000
Referee: Carl Erich Steiner (Austria)

=== Semi-final ===
30 June 1954
18:00 CET (UTC+01)

| Uruguay | 2–4 (a.e.t.) | Hungary |
|---|---|---|
| Hohberg 75', 86' | Report | Czibor 13'; Hidegkuti 46'; Kocsis 111', 116' |

Stade Olympique de la Pontaise, Lausanne
Attendance: 37,000
Referee: Benjamin Griffiths (Wales)

=== Match for third place ===
3 July 1954
17:00 CET (UTC+01)

| Uruguay | 1–3 | Austria |
|---|---|---|
| Hohberg 22' | Report | Stojaspal 16' (pen.); Cruz 59' (o.g.); Ocwirk 89' |

Hardturm Stadium, Zürich
Attendance: 35,000
Referee: Raymon Wyssling (Switzerland)

== Chile 1962 ==
| Team | Pld | W | D | L | GF | GA | GAv | Pts |
|---|---|---|---|---|---|---|---|---|
| Soviet Union | 3 | 2 | 1 | 0 | 8 | 5 | 1.60 | 5 |
| Yugoslavia | 3 | 2 | 0 | 1 | 8 | 3 | 2.67 | 4 |
| Uruguay | 3 | 1 | 0 | 2 | 4 | 6 | 0.67 | 2 |
| Colombia | 3 | 0 | 1 | 2 | 5 | 11 | 0.45 | 1 |

30 May 1962
15:00 CLT (UTC−04)

| Uruguay | 2–1 | Colombia |
|---|---|---|
| Sasía 56'; Cubilla 75' | Report | Zuluaga 19' (pen.) |

Estadio Carlos Dittborn, Arica
Attendance: 7,908
Referee: Andor Dorogi (Hungary)

2 June 1962
15:00 CLT (UTC−04)

| Uruguay | 1–3 | Yugoslavia |
|---|---|---|
| Cabrera 19' | Report | Skoblar 25' (pen.); Galić 29'; Jerković 49' |

Estadio Carlos Dittborn, Arica
Attendance: 8,829
Referee: Karol Galba (Czechoslovakia)

6 June 1962
15:00 CLT (UTC−04)

| Uruguay | 1–2 | Soviet Union |
|---|---|---|
| Sasía 54' | Report | Mamykin 38'; Ivanov 89' |

Estadio Carlos Dittborn, Arica
Attendance: 9,973
Referee: Cesare Jonni (Italy)

== England 1966 ==
| Team | Pld | W | D | L | GF | GA | GAv | Pts |
|---|---|---|---|---|---|---|---|---|
| England | 3 | 2 | 1 | 0 | 4 | 0 | ∞ | 5 |
| Uruguay | 3 | 1 | 2 | 0 | 2 | 1 | 2.00 | 4 |
| Mexico | 3 | 0 | 2 | 1 | 1 | 3 | 0.33 | 2 |
| France | 3 | 0 | 1 | 2 | 2 | 5 | 0.40 | 1 |

11 July 1966
19:30 BST

| England | 0–0 | Uruguay |
|---|---|---|
| | Report |

Wembley Stadium, London
Attendance: 87,000
Referee: István Zsolt (Hungary)

15 July 1966
19:30 BST

| Uruguay | 2–1 | France |
|---|---|---|
| Rocha 26'; Cortés 31' | Report | De Bourgoing 15' (pen.) |

White City Stadium, London
Attendance: 40,000
Referee: Karol Galba (Czechoslovakia)

19 July 1966
16:30 BST

| Mexico | 0–0 | Uruguay |
|---|---|---|
| | Report |

Wembley Stadium, London
Attendance: 61,000
Referee: Bertil Lööw (Sweden)

=== Quarter-final ===
23 July 1966
15:00 BST

| Uruguay | 0–4 | West Germany |
|---|---|---|
| | Report | Haller 11', 83'; Beckenbauer 70'; Seeler 75' |

Hillsborough Stadium, Sheffield
Attendance: 34,000
Referee: Jim Finney (England)

== Mexico 1970 ==
| Team | Pld | W | D | L | GF | GA | GD | Pts |
|---|---|---|---|---|---|---|---|---|
| Italy | 3 | 1 | 2 | 0 | 1 | 0 | +1 | 4 |
| Uruguay | 3 | 1 | 1 | 1 | 2 | 1 | +1 | 3 |
| Sweden | 3 | 1 | 1 | 1 | 2 | 2 | 0 | 3 |
| Israel | 3 | 0 | 2 | 1 | 1 | 3 | –2 | 2 |

2 June 1970
16:00 CST (UTC-06)

| Uruguay | 2–0 | Israel |
|---|---|---|
| Maneiro 23'; Mujica 50' | Report |

Estadio Cuauhtémoc, Puebla
Attendance: 20,000
Referee: Bob Davidson (Scotland)

6 June 1970
16:00 CST (UTC-06)

| Uruguay | 0–0 | Italy |
|---|---|---|
| | Report |

Estadio Cuauhtémoc, Puebla
Attendance: 30,000
Referee: Rudi Glöckner (East Germany)

10 June 1970
16:00 CST (UTC-06)

| Uruguay | 0–1 | Sweden |
|---|---|---|
| | Report | Grahn 90' |

Estadio Cuauhtémoc, Puebla
Attendance: 18,000
Referee: Henry Landauer (United States)

=== Quarter-final ===
14 June 1970
12:00 CST (UTC-06)

| Uruguay | 1–0 (a.e.t.) | Soviet Union |
|---|---|---|
| Espárrago 116' | Report |

Estadio Azteca, Mexico City
Attendance: 24,550
Referee: Laurens van Ravens (Netherlands)

=== Semi-final ===
17 June 1970
16:00 CST (UTC-06)

| Uruguay | 1–3 | Brazil |
|---|---|---|
| Cubilla 19' | Report | Clodoaldo 44'; Jairzinho 76'; Rivellino 89' |

Estadio Jalisco, Guadalajara
Attendance: 51,261
Referee: José María Ortiz de Mendibil (Spain)

=== Match for third place ===
20 June 1970
16:00 CST (UTC-06)

| Uruguay | 0–1 | West Germany |
|---|---|---|
| | Report | Overath 26' |

Estadio Azteca, Mexico City
Attendance: 104,403
Referee: Antonio Sbardella (Italy)

== West Germany 1974 ==
| Team | Pld | W | D | L | GF | GA | GD | Pts |
|---|---|---|---|---|---|---|---|---|
| Netherlands | 3 | 2 | 1 | 0 | 6 | 1 | +5 | 5 |
| Sweden | 3 | 1 | 2 | 0 | 3 | 0 | +3 | 4 |
| Bulgaria | 3 | 0 | 2 | 1 | 2 | 5 | –3 | 2 |
| Uruguay | 3 | 0 | 1 | 2 | 1 | 6 | –5 | 1 |

15 June 1974
16:00 CET

| Uruguay | 0–2 | Netherlands |
|---|---|---|
| | Report | Rep 16', 86' |

Niedersachsenstadion, Hanover
Attendance: 53,700
Referee: Károly Palotai (Hungary)

19 June 1974
19:30 CET

| Bulgaria | 1–1 | Uruguay |
|---|---|---|
| Bonev 75' | Report | Pavoni 87' |

Niedersachsenstadion, Hanover
Attendance: 12,000
Referee: Jack Taylor (England)

23 June 1974
16:00 CET

| Sweden | 3–0 | Uruguay |
|---|---|---|
| Edström 46', 77'; Sandberg 74' | Report |

Rheinstadion, Düsseldorf
Attendance: 27,100
Referee: Erich Linemayr (Austria)

== Mexico 1986 ==
| Team | Pld | W | D | L | GF | GA | GD | Pts |
|---|---|---|---|---|---|---|---|---|
| Denmark | 3 | 3 | 0 | 0 | 9 | 1 | +8 | 6 |
| West Germany | 3 | 1 | 1 | 1 | 3 | 4 | –1 | 3 |
| Uruguay | 3 | 0 | 2 | 1 | 2 | 7 | –5 | 2 |
| Scotland | 3 | 0 | 1 | 2 | 1 | 3 | –2 | 1 |

4 June 1986
12:00 CST

| Uruguay | 1–1 | West Germany |
|---|---|---|
| Alzamendi 4' | Report | Allofs 84' |

Estadio La Corregidora, Querétaro
Attendance: 30,000
Referee: Vojtěch Christov (Czechoslovakia)

8 June 1986
16:00 CST

| Denmark | 6–1 | Uruguay |
|---|---|---|
| Elkjær 11', 67', 80'; Lerby 41'; Laudrup 52'; J. Olsen 88' | Report | Francescoli 45' (pen.) |

Estadio Neza 86, Nezahualcóyotl
Attendance: 26,000
Referee: Antonio Márquez Ramírez (Mexico)

13 June 1986
12:00 CST

| Scotland | 0–0 | Uruguay |
|---|---|---|
| | Report |

Estadio Neza 86, Nezahualcóyotl
Attendance: 20,000
Referee: Joël Quiniou (France)

=== Round of 16 ===
16 June 1986
16:00 CST

| Argentina | 1–0 | Uruguay |
|---|---|---|
| Pasculli 42' | Report |

Estadio Cuauhtémoc, Puebla
Attendance: 26,000
Referee: Luigi Agnolin (Italy)

== Italy 1990 ==
=== Group E ===
| Team | Pld | W | D | L | GF | GA | GD | Pts |
|---|---|---|---|---|---|---|---|---|
| Spain | 3 | 2 | 1 | 0 | 5 | 2 | +3 | 5 |
| Belgium | 3 | 2 | 0 | 1 | 6 | 3 | +3 | 4 |
| Uruguay | 3 | 1 | 1 | 1 | 2 | 3 | –1 | 3 |
| South Korea | 3 | 0 | 0 | 3 | 1 | 6 | –5 | 0 |

13 June 1990
17:00

| Uruguay | 0–0 | Spain |
|---|---|---|
| | Report |

Stadio Friuli, Udine
Attendance: 35,713
Referee: Helmut Kohl (Austria)

17 June 1990
21:00

| Belgium | 3–1 | Uruguay |
|---|---|---|
| Clijsters 16'; Scifo 22'; Ceulemans 48' | Report | Bengoechea 74' |

Stadio Marc'Antonio Bentegodi, Verona
Attendance: 33,759
Referee: Siegfried Kirschen (East Germany)

21 June 1990
17:00

| South Korea | 0–1 | Uruguay |
|---|---|---|
| | Report | Fonseca 90' |

Stadio Friuli, Udine
Attendance: 29,039
Referee: Tullio Lanese (Italy)

=== Round of 16 ===
25 June 1990
21:00

| Italy | 2–0 | Uruguay |
|---|---|---|
| Schillaci 65'; Serena 85' | Report |

Stadio Olimpico, Rome
Attendance: 73,303
Referee: George Courtney (England)

== South Korea/Japan 2002 ==
=== Group A ===
| Team | Pld | W | D | L | GF | GA | GD | Pts |
|---|---|---|---|---|---|---|---|---|
| Denmark | 3 | 2 | 1 | 0 | 5 | 2 | +3 | 7 |
| Senegal | 3 | 1 | 2 | 0 | 5 | 4 | +1 | 5 |
| Uruguay | 3 | 0 | 2 | 1 | 4 | 5 | –1 | 2 |
| France | 3 | 0 | 1 | 2 | 0 | 3 | –3 | 1 |

31 May 2002
18:00

| Uruguay | 1–2 | Denmark |
|---|---|---|
| Rodríguez 47' | Report | Tomasson 45' 83' |

Munsu Cup Stadium, Ulsan
Attendance: 30,157
Referee: Saad Mane (Kuwait)

6 June 2002
20:30

| France | 0–0 | Uruguay |
|---|---|---|
| | Report |

Busan Asiad Main Stadium, Busan
Attendance: 38,289
Referee: Felipe Ramos (Mexico)

11 June 2002
15:30

| Senegal | 3–3 | Uruguay |
|---|---|---|
| Fadiga 20' (pen.); Bouba Diop 26' 38' | Report | Morales 46'; Forlán 69'; Recoba 88' (pen.) |

Suwon World Cup Stadium, Suwon
Attendance: 33,681
Referee: Jan Wegereef (Netherlands)

== South Africa 2010 ==
=== Group A ===
| Team | Pld | W | D | L | GF | GA | GD | Pts |
|---|---|---|---|---|---|---|---|---|
| Uruguay | 3 | 2 | 1 | 0 | 4 | 0 | +4 | 7 |
| Mexico | 3 | 1 | 1 | 1 | 3 | 2 | +1 | 4 |
| South Africa | 3 | 1 | 1 | 1 | 3 | 5 | –2 | 4 |
| France | 3 | 0 | 1 | 2 | 1 | 5 | –4 | 1 |

11 June 2010
20:30 UTC+02

| Uruguay | 0–0 | France |
|---|---|---|
| | Report |

Cape Town Stadium, Cape Town
Attendance: 64,100
Referee: Yuichi Nishimura (Japan)

16 June 2010
20:30 UTC+02

| South Africa | 0–3 | Uruguay |
|---|---|---|
| | Report | Forlán 24', 80' (pen.); Á. Pereira 90+5' |

Loftus Versfeld Stadium, Pretoria
Attendance: 42,658
Referee: Massimo Busacca (Switzerland)

22 June 2010
16:00 UTC+02

| Mexico | 0–1 | Uruguay |
|---|---|---|
| | Report | Suárez 43' |

Royal Bafokeng Stadium, Rustenburg
Attendance: 33,425
Referee: Viktor Kassai (Hungary)

=== Round of 16 ===
26 June 2010
16:00 UTC+02

| Uruguay | 2–1 | South Korea |
|---|---|---|
| Suárez 8', 80' | Report | Lee Chung-Yong 68' |

Nelson Mandela Bay Stadium, Port Elizabeth
Attendance: 30,597
Referee: Wolfgang Stark (Germany)

=== Quarter-final ===
2 July 2010
20:30 UTC+02

| Uruguay | 1–1 (a.e.t.) | Ghana |
|---|---|---|
| Forlán 55' | Report | Muntari 45+2' |
Penalties
| Forlán (penalty scored); Victorino (penalty scored); Scotti (penalty scored); M. Pereira (penalty missed); Abreu (penalty scored) | 4–2 | (penalty scored) Gyan; (penalty scored) Appiah; (penalty missed) Mensah; (penalty missed) Adiyiah |

Soccer City, Johannesburg
Attendance: 84,017
Referee: Olegário Benquerença (Portugal)

=== Semi-final ===
6 July 2010
20:30 UTC+02

| Uruguay | 2–3 | Netherlands |
|---|---|---|
| Forlán 41'; M. Pereira 90+2' | Report | van Bronckhorst 18'; Sneijder 70'; Robben 73' |

Cape Town Stadium, Cape Town
Attendance: 62,479
Referee: Ravshan Irmatov (Uzbekistan)

=== Match for third place ===
10 July 2010
20:30

| Uruguay | 2–3 | Germany |
|---|---|---|
| Cavani 28'; Forlán 51' | Report | Müller 19'; Jansen 56'; Khedira 82' |

Nelson Mandela Bay Stadium, Port Elizabeth
Attendance: 36,254
Referee: Benito Archundia (Mexico)

== Brazil 2014 ==
=== Group D ===
| Pos | Team | Pld | W | D | L | GF | GA | GD | Pts | Qualification |
|---|---|---|---|---|---|---|---|---|---|---|
| 1 | Costa Rica | 3 | 2 | 1 | 0 | 4 | 1 | +3 | 7 | Advance to knockout stage |
| 2 | Uruguay | 3 | 2 | 0 | 1 | 4 | 4 | 0 | 6 | Advance to knockout stage |
| 3 | Italy | 3 | 1 | 0 | 2 | 2 | 3 | −1 | 3 | |
| 4 | England | 3 | 0 | 1 | 2 | 2 | 4 | −2 | 1 | |

Source: FIFA
Rules for classification: Tie-breaking criteria
14 June 2014
16:00 BRT (UTC−3)

| Uruguay | 1–3 | Costa Rica |
|---|---|---|
| Cavani 24' (pen.) | | Campbell 54'; Duarte 57'; Ureña 84' |

Estádio Castelão, Fortaleza
Attendance: 58,679
Referee: Felix Brych (Germany)

19 June 2014
16:00 BRT (UTC−3)

| Uruguay | 2–1 | England |
|---|---|---|
| Suárez 39', 85' | | Rooney 75' |

Arena de São Paulo, São Paulo
Attendance: 62,575
Referee: Carlos Velasco Carballo (Spain)

24 June 2014
13:00 BRT (UTC−3)

| Italy | 0–1 | Uruguay |
|---|---|---|
| | | Godín 81' |

Arena das Dunas, Natal
Attendance: 39,706
Referee: Marco Rodríguez (Mexico)

=== Round of 16 ===
28 June 2014
17:00 UTC-03

| Colombia | 2–0 | Uruguay |
|---|---|---|
| Rodríguez 28', 50' | Report |

Estádio do Maracanã, Rio de Janeiro
Attendance: 73,804
Referee: Björn Kuipers (Netherlands)

== Russia 2018 ==
=== Group A ===
| Pos | Team | Pld | W | D | L | GF | GA | GD | Pts | Qualification |
|---|---|---|---|---|---|---|---|---|---|---|
| 1 | Uruguay | 3 | 3 | 0 | 0 | 5 | 0 | +5 | 9 | Advance to knockout stage |
| 2 | Russia (H) | 3 | 2 | 0 | 1 | 8 | 4 | +4 | 6 | Advance to knockout stage |
| 3 | Saudi Arabia | 3 | 1 | 0 | 2 | 2 | 7 | −5 | 3 | |
| 4 | Egypt | 3 | 0 | 0 | 3 | 2 | 6 | −4 | 0 | |

Source: FIFA
Rules for classification: Group stage tiebreakers
(H) Hosts
15 June 2018
17:00 YEKT (UTC+5)

| Egypt | 0–1 | Uruguay |
|---|---|---|
| | | Giménez 89' |

Central Stadium, Yekaterinburg
Attendance: 27,015
Referee: Björn Kuipers (Netherlands)

20 June 2018
18:00 MSK (UTC+3)

| Uruguay | 1–0 | Saudi Arabia |
|---|---|---|
| Suárez 23' |

Rostov Arena, Rostov-on-Don
Attendance: 42,678
Referee: Clément Turpin (France)

25 June 2018
18:00 SAMT (UTC+4)

| Uruguay | 3–0 | Russia |
|---|---|---|
| Suárez 10'; Cheryshev 23' (o.g.); Cavani 90' |

Cosmos Arena, Samara
Attendance: 41,970
Referee: Malang Diedhiou (Senegal)

=== Round of 16 ===
30 June 2018
21:00 UTC+3

| Uruguay | 2–1 | Portugal |
|---|---|---|
| Cavani 7', 62' | | Pepe 55' |

Fisht Olympic Stadium, Sochi
Attendance: 44,287
Referee: César Arturo Ramos (Mexico)

=== Quarter-final ===
6 July 2018
17:00 UTC+3

| Uruguay | 0–2 | France |
|---|---|---|
| | | Varane 41'; Griezmann 60' |

Nizhny Novgorod Stadium, Nizhny Novgorod
Attendance: 43,319
Referee: Néstor Pitana (Argentina)

== Qatar 2022 ==
=== Group stage ===
| Pos | Team | Pld | W | D | L | GF | GA | GD | Pts | Qualification |
|---|---|---|---|---|---|---|---|---|---|---|
| 1 | Portugal | 3 | 2 | 0 | 1 | 6 | 4 | +2 | 6 | Advance to knockout stage |
| 2 | South Korea | 3 | 1 | 1 | 1 | 4 | 4 | 0 | 4 | Advance to knockout stage |
| 3 | Uruguay | 3 | 1 | 1 | 1 | 2 | 2 | 0 | 4 | |
| 4 | Ghana | 3 | 1 | 0 | 2 | 5 | 7 | −2 | 3 | |

Source: FIFA
Rules for classification: Group stage tiebreakers
24 November 2022
16:00

| Uruguay | 0–0 | South Korea |

Education City Stadium, Al Rayyan
Attendance: 41,663
Referee: Clément Turpin (France)

28 November 2022
22:00

| Portugal | 2–0 | Uruguay |
|---|---|---|
| Fernandes 54', 90+3' (pen.) |

Lusail Stadium, Lusail
Attendance: 88,668
Referee: Alireza Faghani (Iran)

2 December 2022
18:00

| Ghana | 0–2 | Uruguay |
|---|---|---|
| | | De Arrascaeta 26', 32' |

Al Janoub Stadium, Al Wakrah
Attendance: 43,443
Referee: Daniel Siebert (Germany)

== Canada/Mexico/United States 2026 ==
=== Group stage ===
| Pos | Team | Pld | W | D | L | GF | GA | GD | Pts | Qualification |
|---|---|---|---|---|---|---|---|---|---|---|
| 1 | Spain | 3 | 2 | 1 | 0 | 5 | 0 | +5 | 7 | Advance to knockout stage |
| 2 | Cape Verde | 3 | 0 | 3 | 0 | 2 | 2 | 0 | 3 | Advance to knockout stage |
| 3 | Uruguay | 3 | 0 | 2 | 1 | 3 | 4 | −1 | 2 (Note: Tied on head-to-head result (Saudi Arabia 1–1 Uruguay). Overall goal difference was used as the tiebreaker.) | |
| 4 | Saudi Arabia | 3 | 0 | 2 | 1 | 1 | 5 | −4 | 2 | |

Source: FIFA
Rules for classification: Group stage tiebreakers
Notes:
June 15, 2026
6:00 p.m. UTC−4

| Saudi Arabia | 1–1 | Uruguay |
|---|---|---|
| Al-Amri 41' | (Note: "Saudi Arabia vs Uruguay | First Stage | FIFA World Cup 2026". FIFA. Retrieved June 15, 2026.; "Match Report – Group H – Saudi Arabia v. Uruguay". FIFA. Retrieved June 15, 2026.; "Post match summary report – Group H – Saudi Arabia v. Uruguay". FIFA. June 15, 2026. Retrieved June 17, 2026.) | M. Araújo 80' |

Hard Rock Stadium, Miami Gardens
Attendance: 62,764
Referee: Maurizio Mariani (Italy)

June 21, 2026
6:00 p.m. UTC−4

| Uruguay | 2–2 | Cape Verde |
|---|---|---|
| M. Araújo 44'; Canobbio 45+6' | (Note: "Uruguay vs Cabo Verde | First Stage | FIFA World Cup 2026". FIFA. Retrieved June 22, 2026.; "Match Report – Group H – Uruguay v. Cabo Verde". FIFA. June 22, 2026. Retrieved June 22, 2026.; "Post match summary report – Group H – Uruguay v. Cabo Verde". FIFA. June 22, 2026. Retrieved June 22, 2026.) | K. Pina 21'; Varela 61' |

Hard Rock Stadium, Miami Gardens
Attendance: 64,003
Referee: Espen Eskås (Norway)

June 26, 2026
6:00 p.m. UTC−6

| Uruguay | 0–1 | Spain |
|---|---|---|
| | (Note: "Uruguay vs Spain | First Stage | FIFA World Cup 2026". FIFA. Retrieved June 27, 2026.; "Match Report – Group H – Uruguay v. Spain". FIFA. June 27, 2026. Retrieved June 27, 2026.; "Post match summary report – Group H – Uruguay v. Spain". FIFA. June 27, 2026. Retrieved June 27, 2026.) | Baena 42' |

Estadio Akron, Zapopan
Attendance: 45,065
Referee: Ismail Elfath (United States)

== Most appearances ==
| Rank | Player | Matches | World Cups |
|---|---|---|---|
| 1 | Fernando Muslera | 19 | 2010, 2014, 2018, 2022 and 2026 |
| 2 | Edinson Cavani | 17 | 2010, 2014 and 2018 |
| 3 | Diego Godín | 16 | 2010, 2014, 2018 and 2022 |
| 3 | Luis Suárez | 16 | 2010, 2014, 2018 and 2022 |
| 5 | Ladislao Mazurkiewicz | 13 | 1966, 1970 and 1974 |
| 6 | Martín Cáceres | 12 | 2010, 2014, 2018 and 2022 |
| 7 | Julio César Cortés | 11 | 1962, 1966 and 1970 |
| 7 | Egidio Arévalo | 11 | 2010 and 2014 |
| 7 | Rodrigo Bentancur | 11 | 2018, 2022 and 2026 |
| 10 | Pedro Rocha | 10 | 1962, 1966, 1970 and 1974 |
| 10 | Luis Ubiña | 10 | 1966 and 1970 |
| 10 | Diego Forlán | 10 | 2002, 2010 and 2014 |
| 10 | Maxi Pereira | 10 | 2010 and 2014 |
| 10 | José Giménez | 10 | 2014, 2018, 2022 and 2026 |

== Top goalscorers ==
On July 18th 1930, Héctor Castro made history by scoring Uruguay's first-ever FIFA World Cup goal. He did it on home soil during the first-ever edition of the tournament against Peru in Montevideo.

| Rank | Player | Goals | World Cups |
|---|---|---|---|
| 1 | Oscar Míguez | 8 | 1950 (5) and 1954 (3) |
| 2 | Luis Suárez | 7 | 2010 (3), 2014 (2) and 2018 (2) |
| 3 | Diego Forlán | 6 | 2002 (1) and 2010 (5) |
| 4 | Pedro Cea | 5 | 1930 |
| 4 | Juan Alberto Schiaffino | 5 | 1950 (3) and 1954 (2) |
| 4 | Edinson Cavani | 5 | 2010 (1), 2014 (1), and 2018 (3) |
| 7 | Alcides Ghiggia | 4 | 1950 |
| 7 | Carlos Borges | 4 | 1954 |
| 9 | Peregrino Anselmo | 3 | 1930 |
| 9 | Juan Hohberg | 3 | 1954 |

== Head-to-head record ==
| Opponent | Pld | W | D | L | GF | GA | GD | Win % |
|---|---|---|---|---|---|---|---|---|
| Argentina | 2 | 1 | 0 | 1 | 4 | 3 | +1 | 50.00 |
| Austria | 1 | 0 | 0 | 1 | 1 | 3 | −2 | 0.00 |
| Belgium | 1 | 0 | 0 | 1 | 1 | 3 | −2 | 0.00 |
| Bolivia | 1 | 1 | 0 | 0 | 8 | 0 | +8 | 100.00 |
| Brazil | 2 | 1 | 0 | 1 | 3 | 4 | −1 | 50.00 |
| Bulgaria | 1 | 0 | 1 | 0 | 1 | 1 | +0 | 0.00 |
| Cape Verde | 1 | 0 | 1 | 0 | 2 | 2 | +0 | 0.00 |
| Colombia | 2 | 1 | 0 | 1 | 2 | 3 | −1 | 50.00 |
| Costa Rica | 1 | 0 | 0 | 1 | 1 | 3 | −2 | 0.00 |
| Czechoslovakia | 1 | 1 | 0 | 0 | 2 | 0 | +2 | 100.00 |
| Denmark | 2 | 0 | 0 | 2 | 2 | 8 | −6 | 0.00 |
| Egypt | 1 | 1 | 0 | 0 | 1 | 0 | +1 | 100.00 |
| England | 3 | 2 | 1 | 0 | 6 | 3 | +3 | 66.67 |
| France | 4 | 1 | 2 | 1 | 2 | 3 | −1 | 25.00 |
| Germany | 1 | 0 | 0 | 1 | 2 | 3 | −1 | 0.00 |
| Ghana | 2 | 1 | 1 | 0 | 3 | 1 | +2 | 50.00 |
| Hungary | 1 | 0 | 0 | 1 | 2 | 4 | −2 | 0.00 |
| Israel | 1 | 1 | 0 | 0 | 2 | 0 | +2 | 100.00 |
| Italy | 3 | 1 | 1 | 1 | 1 | 2 | −1 | 33.33 |
| Mexico | 2 | 1 | 1 | 0 | 1 | 0 | +1 | 50.00 |
| Netherlands | 2 | 0 | 0 | 2 | 2 | 5 | −3 | 0.00 |
| Peru | 1 | 1 | 0 | 0 | 1 | 0 | +1 | 100.00 |
| Portugal | 2 | 1 | 0 | 1 | 2 | 3 | −1 | 50.00 |
| Romania | 1 | 1 | 0 | 0 | 4 | 0 | +4 | 100.00 |
| Russia | 1 | 1 | 0 | 0 | 3 | 0 | +3 | 100.00 |
| Saudi Arabia | 2 | 1 | 1 | 0 | 2 | 1 | +1 | 50.00 |
| Scotland | 2 | 1 | 1 | 0 | 7 | 0 | +7 | 50.00 |
| Senegal | 1 | 0 | 1 | 0 | 3 | 3 | +0 | 0.00 |
| South Africa | 1 | 1 | 0 | 0 | 3 | 0 | +3 | 100.00 |
| South Korea | 3 | 2 | 1 | 0 | 3 | 1 | +2 | 66.67 |
| Soviet Union | 2 | 1 | 0 | 1 | 2 | 2 | +0 | 50.00 |
| Spain | 3 | 0 | 2 | 1 | 2 | 3 | −1 | 0.00 |
| Sweden | 3 | 1 | 0 | 2 | 3 | 6 | −3 | 33.33 |
| West Germany | 3 | 0 | 1 | 2 | 1 | 6 | −5 | 0.00 |
| Yugoslavia | 2 | 1 | 0 | 1 | 7 | 4 | +3 | 50.00 |
| Total | 62 | 25 | 15 | 22 | 92 | 80 | +12 | 40.32 |

== See also ==
- Uruguay at the Copa América
- South American nations at the FIFA World Cup
