= Marcos Coll =

Colombian footballer (1935–2017)

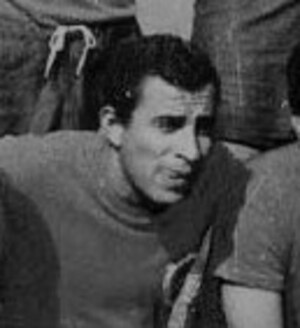

Personal information
- Full name: Marco Tulio Coll Tesillo
- Date of birth: 23 August 1935
- Place of birth: Barranquilla, Colombia
- Date of death: 5 June 2017 (aged 81)
- Place of death: Barranquilla, Colombia
- Height: 1.72 m (5 ft 8 in)
- Position: Midfielder

Senior career*
Years	Team	Apps	(Gls)
1952–1955	Sporting Club de Barranquilla		
1955	Medellín		
1956–1959	Deportes Tolima		
1960	Club Atlético Platense		
1960–1965	América de Cali	–	
1965–1969	Deportes Tolima		
1970–1971	Atlético Junior		

International career
1956–1962	Colombia	11	(5)
- * Club domestic league appearances and goals

Marco Tulio Coll Tesillo (23 August 1935 – 5 June 2017), also known as El Olímpico, was a Colombian professional footballer. He played for América de Cali and other clubs, and represented Colombia in the 1962 FIFA World Cup. He was famous for scoring the first and only Olympic goal in any men's FIFA World Cup, beating legendary goalkeeper Lev Yashin in a 4–4 draw against the Soviets in 1962.

== Early life ==
Coll was born in Barranquilla in 1935.

== Career ==
He started his career with Sporting Barranquilla (1952–55). In 1956, he played for Independiente Medellín and played his first match for Colombia in a 1958 FIFA World Cup Qualifier in the same year. He later played for Deportes Tolima in 1960. Shortly thereafter in 1962 Coll joined América de Cali where he was remembered with scoring a notable goal. In 1965 he played for Deportes Tolima. In the period of 1970-1971 Coll played for Atlético Junior after which he retired from his career as a footballer.

=== 1962 Olympic goal ===
This achievement came in Arica, Chile, on 3 June 1962, during the development of the game between Colombia and the USSR of the first round of the World Cup. Colombia was down 4–1. Then they were given a corner kick. Marco Coll kicked the ball and scored a direct goal. Colombia would eventually tie with USSR with goals from Antonio Rada and Marino Klinger. At one interview, Coll claimed he aimed for the goal as the Colombian players were too short compared to their Russian opponents. Coll also said it was the first and only time he ever tried to score a goal from that position. The goal inspired a reaction to tie the game 4–4.

== Death ==
Coll died on 5 June 2017, aged 81, in his native Barranquilla after a short illness.

== See also ==
- Olympic goal
- 1962 FIFA World Cup
