= Ronald Langón =

Uruguayan footballer (1939–2021)

Personal information
- Full name: Rónald Arturo Ataides Langón
- Date of birth: 6 August 1939
- Place of birth: Uruguay
- Date of death: 31 August 2021 (aged 82)
- Height: 1.75 m (5 ft 9 in)
- Position: Midfielder

Senior career*
Years	Team	Apps	(Gls)
- Defensor Sporting

International career
- Uruguay
- * Club domestic league appearances and goals

Ronald Arturo Ataides Langón (6 August 1939 – 31 August 2021) was a Uruguayan football midfielder who played for Uruguay in the 1962 FIFA World Cup. He also played for Defensor Sporting. Langón died on 31 August 2021, at the age of 82.
