= Vojislav Melić =

Serbian footballer (1940–2006)

Vojkan Melić
Personal information
- Full name: Vojislav Melić
- Date of birth: 5 January 1940
- Place of birth: Šabac, Kingdom of Yugoslavia
- Date of death: 7 April 2006 (aged 66)
- Place of death: Belgrade, Serbia and Montenegro
- Height: 1.74 m (5 ft 9 in)
- Position: Midfielder

Senior career*
Years	Team	Apps	(Gls)
1958–1960	Mačva Šabac		
1960–1967	Red Star Belgrade	140	(9)
1967–1973	Sochaux	205	(38)
1973–1977	Béziers	95	(12)

International career
1962–1967	Yugoslavia	27	(2)

Managerial career
- Crvenka
- Mačva Šabac
- * Club domestic league appearances and goals

Vojislav "Vojkan" Melić (Serbian Cyrillic: Војислав Војкан Мелић; 5 January 1940 – 7 April 2006) was a Yugoslavian footballer. He was one of the most versatile and skilled players that Yugoslavia had in 1960s. Vojislav spent part of his career in France and played in the FIFA World Cup 1962.

== Club career ==
Melić played his first match for Red Star in August 1960. He played 312 games and scored 54 goals. With Red Star he won the "double crown" - the National Championship and Cup in 1963–64. Melić played in France for Sochaux from 1967 to 1973 and Beziers from 1973 to 1977.

== International career ==
Melić was a member of Yugoslavia national team and he scored 2 goals in 27 matches. He was a very versatile player who was able to play almost any field position (from right and left defender, midfielder, winger to striker). He officially played seven different positions for the national team. In his first game for the national team against Colombia in FIFA World Cup 1962 in Chile, he scored his first goal. Yugoslavia finished in fourth place. His final international was a May 1967 European Championship qualification match away against Albania.

Melić also played in three games for the Yugoslavian U21 team from 1959 to 1961.

== Post-playing career ==
He continued his coaching career in Beziers, FK Mačva Šabac, FK Crvenka and youth selections of Red Star until his death.

Melić died on 7 April 2006 in Belgrade, Serbia.
