= Emilio Álvarez (Uruguayan footballer) =

Uruguayan footballer (1939-2010)

Personal information
- Full name: Emilio Wálter Álvarez Silva
- Date of birth: 10 February 1939
- Place of birth: Montevideo, Uruguay
- Date of death: 22 April 2010 (aged 71)
- Place of death: Montevideo, Uruguay
- Position: Defender

Senior career*
Years	Team	Apps	(Gls)
1959–1970	Nacional		
1971	Sud América		

International career
1960–1967	Uruguay		
- * Club domestic league appearances and goals

Emilio Wálter Álvarez Silva (10 February 1939 – 22 April 2010) was a Uruguayan football defender who played for Uruguay in the 1962 and 1966 FIFA World Cups. He also played for Club Nacional de Football.

He died in 2010, aged 71. His remains are buried at Cementerio del Norte, Montevideo.
