= Roberto Sosa (Uruguayan footballer) =

Uruguayan footballer (1935–2008)

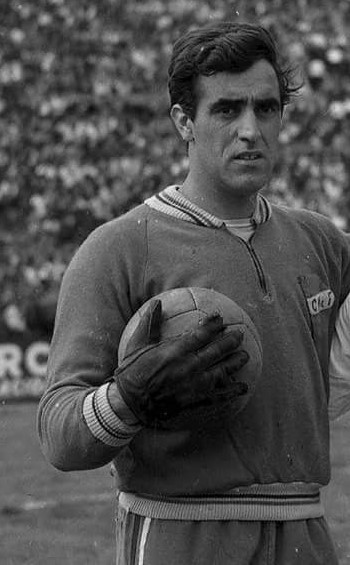
- Sosa with Nacional in 1960

Personal information
- Full name: Roberto Eliseo Sosa Echartea
- Date of birth: 14 June 1935
- Place of birth: San Carlos, Uruguay
- Date of death: 27 June 2008 (aged 73)
- Position: Goalkeeper

Senior career*
Years	Team	Apps	(Gls)
	Policial San Carlos	–	(–)
1952	San Carlos	–	(–)
1953–1967	Nacional	183	(0)
1968	Universidad de Chile	14	(0)
1969–1970	River Plate Montevideo		
1971	Fénix		
1972	San Carlos	–	(–)

International career
1959–1967	Uruguay	22	(0)
- * Club domestic league appearances and goals

Roberto Eliseo Sosa Echartea (born 14 June 1935, died 27 Jun 2008) was a Uruguayan football goalkeeper who played for Uruguay in the 1962 and 1966 FIFA World Cups. He also played for Club Nacional de Football.

== Teams ==
- (Uruguay) Policial San Carlos
- (Uruguay) San Carlos 1952
- (Uruguay) Nacional 1953–1967
- Universidad de Chile 1968
- (Uruguay) River Plate 1969–1970
- (Uruguay) Fénix 1971
- (Uruguay) San Carlos 1972
