= Leonid Ostrovski =

Soviet footballer and manager

Personal information
- Full name: Leonid Alfonsovich Ostrovsky
- Date of birth: 17 January 1936
- Place of birth: Riga, Latvia
- Date of death: 17 April 2001 (aged 65)
- Place of death: Kyiv, Ukraine
- Position: Defender

Youth career
- VEF Rīga
- FK Daugava Rīga

Senior career*
Years	Team	Apps	(Gls)
1954–1955	FK Daugava Rīga	56	(0)
1956–1962	FC Torpedo Moscow	145	(0)
1963–1968	FC Dynamo Kyiv	135	(1)
1970	FC Mashuk Pyatigorsk	0	(0)

International career
1958–1966	Soviet Union	9	(0)

Managerial career
- 1971: FC Dnipro Cherkasy
- 1974: FC Start Chuhuiv
- 1975–1976: Skury Tsalenjikha
- * Club domestic league appearances and goals

Leonid Ostrovski (Russian: Леонид Альфонсович Островский, romanized: Leonid Alfonsovich Ostrovsky, Latvian: Leonīds Ostrovskis; 17 January 1936 in Riga – 17 April 2001 in Kyiv) was a Latvian footballer and then when Latvia was occupied - Soviet football player and manager of Jewish origin. He is the greatest and most accomplished Latvian footballer in history, being the only Latvian who has played in the World Cup.

== Club career ==
Ostrovskis began his career with his hometown club - Daugava Rīga in 1954. The young left-back played two and a half seasons with Daugava in the Soviet First League, earning a good reputation and the interest from the Soviet Top League side - Torpedo Moscow. Ostrovskis joined the ZIL factory team in 1956, making his Soviet Top League debut on 12 May in a draw against Dynamo Kiev.

In 1960, the factory team won the Soviet Top League title, as well as the Soviet Cup, and Ostrovskis played 29 games that season. The following season, Torpedo once again was among the leading Soviet sides, but eventually, they finished second. Ostrovskis played with Torpedo till 1963, when he got an offer to join the Dynamo Kiev team. Initially, this caused a suspension since the Torpedo did not want him to leave, but after a while, he was cleared to play.

The 6-year stint in Kiev was the most successful of his career. Ostrovskis won three more Soviet Top League titles (1966, 1967, 1968), as well as two Soviet Cups (1964, 1966), playing alongside such talented players, like Anatoly Byshovets, Evgeny Rudakov and Yozhef Sabo. After winning his fourth Soviet Top League title, Ostrovskis retired at the age of 32 due to injuries. In total, Ostrovskis played 135 games with Dynamo Kiev, scoring one goal.

== International career ==
Ostrovski made his debut for the national team on 18 November 1961 in a friendly against Argentina (he was selected for the 1958 FIFA World Cup squad, but did not play in any games at the tournament).

He played in two World Cups: 1962 and 1966. He was the only footballer from Latvia for the Soviet Union in the World Cups.

== Honours ==
- Soviet Top League winner: 1960, 1966, 1967, 1968
- Soviet Cup winner: 1960, 1964, 1966
