= Eduard Dubinski =

Ukrainian footballer (1935–1969)

Personal information
- Full name: Eduard Isaakovich Dubinski
- Date of birth: 6 April 1935
- Place of birth: Kharkiv, Ukrainian SSR, Soviet Union
- Date of death: 11 May 1969 (aged 34)
- Place of death: Moscow, Russian SFSR, Soviet Union
- Height: 1.74 m (5 ft 9 in)
- Position: Defender

Youth career
- 1952: Lokomotiv Kharkiv

Senior career*
Years	Team	Apps	(Gls)
1954	Lokomotiv Kharkiv	5	(0)
1955–1956	ODO Kyiv	29	(0)
1956	ODO Sverdlovsk	18	(0)
1957–1964	CSKA Moscow	112	(3)
1964–1965	KFK YuGV (Hungary)		
1966–1967	SKA Odesa	14	(1)
1967–1968	FC Metallurg Lipetsk		

International career
1961–1963	Soviet Union	12	(0)
Medal record
Representing Soviet Union
UEFA European Championship
Runner-up	Spain 1964	Team
- * Club domestic league appearances and goals

Eduard Isaakovich Dubinski (Russian: Эдуард Исаакович Дубинский, Ukrainian: Едуард Ісаакович Дубинський, Eduard Isaakovych Dubynskyi; 19 April 1935 in Kharkiv – 11 May 1969 in Moscow) was a Ukrainian and Soviet football defender who was best known for suffering a horrific injury at the 1962 FIFA World Cup that contributed to his death.

== Biography ==
Born in Kharkiv to a Jewish family, Dubinski played as a sweeper or a full-back and was a member of the Soviet Union national football team in the 1960s, going on to win a total of 12 caps. In 1962, two years after the Soviets won the initial European Nations Cup, Dubinsky played at the 1962 FIFA World Cup in Chile. In the first match of the preliminary round, Dubinsky's leg was broken by Yugoslav Muhamed Mujić (who was not penalised for the foul, but later suspended by his team). The injury caused sarcoma (a form of cancer), which eventually contributed to his death a number of years later.
