= Muhamed Mujić =

Yugoslav-Bosnian footballer (1933–2016)

Personal information
- Full name: Muhamed Mujić
- Date of birth: 25 April 1933
- Place of birth: Mostar, Kingdom of Yugoslavia
- Date of death: 20 February 2016 (aged 82)
- Place of death: Mostar, Bosnia and Herzegovina
- Position: Forward

Senior career*
Years	Team	Apps	(Gls)
1950–1962	Velež Mostar	341	(104)
1962–1963	Bordeaux	18	(3)
1963–1964	Dinamo Zagreb	23	(7)
1964–1966	Velež Mostar	47	(11)
1966	Beringen	3	(1)
1966–1968	Velež Mostar	24	(7)
Total		456	(133)

International career
1956–1962	Yugoslavia	32	(17)

Managerial career
- 1976–1977: Velež Mostar
- 1982–1983: Velež Mostar
Medal record
Men's Football
Representing Yugoslavia
Summer Olympics
Silver medal – second place	1956 Melbourne	Team
European Championship
Silver medal – second place	1960 France	Team
- * Club domestic league appearances and goals

Muhamed Mujić (25 April 1933 – 20 February 2016) was a Yugoslav footballer of Bosnian ethnicity.

Mujić played for Velež Mostar for most of his career and made his international debut in an April 1956 Central European International Cup match against Hungary. He was a silver medalist at the 1956 Summer Olympics. At the 1962 FIFA World Cup in Chile, he broke Soviet defender Eduard Dubinski's leg, partially causing his death seven years later. Although West German referee Albert Dusch took no action, Mujić was sent home by the Yugoslav football federation, never to be called up again. In total, from 1956 to 1962, he scored 17 goals for the national team in 32 appearances.

== International goals ==
#	Date	Venue	Opponent	Score	Result	Competition
1.	28 November 1956	Olympic Park Stadium, Melbourne, Australia	United States	9–1	Win	1956 Olympics
2.	29 September 1957	Stadionul Național, Bucharest, Romania	Romania	1–1	Draw	1958 World Cup qual.
3.	10 November 1957	JNA Stadium, Belgrade, SFR Yugoslavia	Greece	4–1	Win	1958 World Cup qual.
4.	10 November 1957	JNA Stadium, Belgrade, SFR Yugoslavia	Greece	4–1	Win	1958 World Cup qual.
5.	14 September 1958	Praterstadion, Vienna, Austria	Austria	3–4	Win	Friendly
6.	11 October 1959	JNA Stadium, Belgrade, SFR Yugoslavia	Hungary	2–4	Lost	Friendly
7.	25 October 1959	Vasil Levski Stadium, Sofia, Bulgaria	Bulgaria	1–1	Draw	1960 ENC qual.
8.	15 November 1959	JNA Stadium, Belgrade, SFR Yugoslavia	Greece	4–0	Win	1960 Olympics qual.
9.	15 November 1959	JNA Stadium, Belgrade, SFR Yugoslavia	Greece	4–0	Win	1960 Olympics qual.
10.	20 December 1959	Niedersachsenstadion, Hannover, West Germany	West Germany	1–1	Draw	Friendly
11.	10 April 1960	JNA Stadium, Belgrade, SFR Yugoslavia	Israel	1–2	Lost	1960 Olympics qual.
12.	18 June 1961	JNA Stadium, Belgrade, SFR Yugoslavia	Morocco	3–2	Win	Friendly
13.	2 December 1961	Government Stadium, British Hong Kong	Hong Kong	1–2	Win	Friendly
14.	7 December 1961	Gelora Senayan Main Stadium, Jakarta, Indonesia	Indonesia	1–5	Win	Friendly
Correct as of 7 March 2016
