= Eliseo Álvarez =

Uruguayan footballer (1940–1999)

Personal information
- Date of birth: 9 August 1940
- Place of birth: Uruguay
- Date of death: 1999 (aged 58–59)
- Height: 1.68 m (5 ft 6 in)
- Position: Defender

Senior career*
Years	Team	Apps	(Gls)
- Club Nacional de Football
- Rampla Juniors
1967	Banfield	17	(13)
1968	Platense	19	(0)
1972	L.D.U. Quito	?	(?)

International career
1962–1966	Uruguay	7	(0)
- * Club domestic league appearances and goals

Eliseo Álvarez (9 August 1940 – 1999) was a Uruguayan football defender who played for Uruguay in the 1962 and 1966 FIFA World Cups. He also played for Club Nacional de Football and Rampla Juniors. In Argentina, he played for Banfield and Platense.
