= Carlos Dittborn Stadium =

Multi-purpose stadium in Arica, Chile

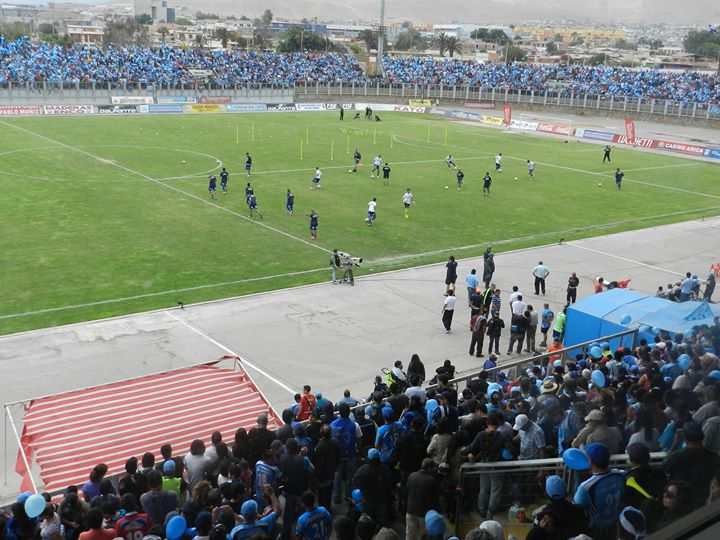
- Interactive map of Carlos Dittborn Stadium
- Location: Arica, Chile
- Coordinates: 18°29′15″S 70°17′57″W
- Capacity: 9,746
- Surface: grass
- Field size: 105 x 68 m

Construction
- Opened: April 15, 1962
- Architect: Bresciani Valdés Castillo Huidobro

Tenants
- San Marcos de Arica; Deportivo Universidad de Tarapacá

The Carlos Dittborn Stadium (Spanish: Estadio Carlos Dittborn) is a multi-purpose stadium in Arica, Chile. Primarily used for football matches, it was constructed in 1962 specifically for the purpose of hosting games during the 1962 World Cup, which took place in Chile. The stadium, named after Carlos Dittborn, the president of the Chilean Organization Committee for the World Cup, who died a month before the tournament began, currently has a seating capacity of 9,746 spectators. It serves as the home stadium for the San Marcos de Arica football club.

During the 1962 World Cup, the Estadio Carlos Dittborn hosted matches from Group 1, featuring teams such as the Soviet Union, Yugoslavia, Uruguay, and Colombia. Additionally, it was the venue for a second-round match between Chile and the Soviet Union. Notably, this stadium witnessed a historic moment in World Cup history (as of 2018) when Colombian player Marcos Coll scored the only Olympic goal ever recorded in the tournament, directly from a corner kick, against Russian goalkeeper Lev Yashin.
