= Hector Echeverri =

Colombian footballer (1938–1988)

Personal information
- Full name: Héctor Echeverri Atehortúa
- Date of birth: 10 April 1938
- Place of birth: Colombia
- Date of death: 1988
- Position: Defender

Senior career*
Years	Team	Apps	(Gls)
1959–1967	Independiente Medellín	322	(1)
1967	Santa Fe	0	(0)
1968–1970	Independiente Medellín	135	(0)
Total		457	(1)

International career
1957–1962	Colombia	12	(0)
- * Club domestic league appearances and goals

Héctor Echeverri Atehortúa (10 April 1938 – 1988), often misspelled as Héctor Echeverry, was a Colombian international footballer.

== Club career ==
Echeverri played in 457 official matches for Independiente Medellín, more than any other player in the club's history.

== International career ==
He competed for the Colombia national football team at the 1962 FIFA World Cup which was held in Chile. He played in their second group game on 3 June 1962 against the then Soviet Union.
