= Óscar López (Colombian footballer) =

Colombian footballer (1939-2005)

Personal information
- Full name: Óscar López Vázquez
- Date of birth: 2 April 1939
- Place of birth: Medellín, Colombia
- Date of death: 20 December 2005 (aged 66)
- Place of death: Cali, Colombia
- Position: Defender

Senior career*
Years	Team	Apps	(Gls)
1961–1963	Once Caldas		
1964–1974	Deportivo Cali		

International career
1961–1972	Colombia	28	(0)
- * Club domestic league appearances and goals

Óscar López Vázquez (2 April 1939 – 20 December 2005) was a Colombian international footballer. He competed for the Colombia national football team at the 1962 FIFA World Cup which was held in Chile.

== Career ==
Born in Medellín, López played professional football in Colombia. The defender made his debut for Once Caldas in 1961, before joining Deportivo Cali in 1964. He won four league titles in his 10-year career with Cali.

López made 28 appearances for the Colombia national football team from 1961 to 1972.

== Personal ==
In December 2005, López died from diabetes in Cali.
