= Aníbal Alzate =

Colombian footballer (1933-2016)

Personal information
- Full name: Aníbal Alzate Sosa
- Date of birth: January 31, 1933
- Place of birth: Colombia
- Date of death: March 31, 2016 (aged 83)

Senior career*
Years	Team	Apps	(Gls)
1955–1966	Deportes Tolima	?	(?)
Total		?	(?)

International career
- Colombia
- * Club domestic league appearances and goals

Aníbal Alzate Sosa (31 January 1933 – 31 March 2016) was a Colombian footballer. He competed for the Colombia national football team at the 1962 FIFA World Cup which was held in Chile.
