= José Sasía =

Uruguayan footballer (1933-1996)

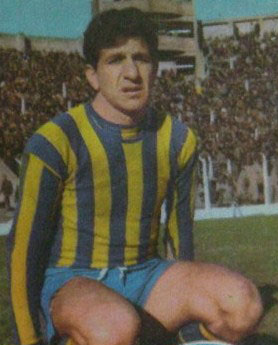
- Sasía in 1965

Personal information
- Full name: José Francisco Sasía Lugo
- Date of birth: 27 December 1933
- Place of birth: Treinta y Tres, Uruguay
- Date of death: 30 August 1996 (aged 62)
- Place of death: Montevideo, Uruguay
- Height: 1.81 m (5 ft 11 in)
- Position: Forward

Senior career*
Years	Team	Apps	(Gls)
1952–1959	Defensor Sporting		
1960	Boca Juniors	13	(3)
1961–1965	Peñarol		
1965	Rosario Central	26	(6)
1966–1967	Defensor Sporting		
1968	Nacional		
1969	Racing de Montevideo		
1969	Olimpia		
1970	Defensor Sporting		

International career
1956–1966	Uruguay	43	(12)

Managerial career
- 1971: Rampla Juniors
- 1972: Racing de Montevideo
- Deportivo Galicia
- Cerro
- Aucas
- 1976: Liverpool
- Progreso
- Olimpia
- Paraguay
- 1979–1980: Aris Thessaloniki
- 1980: Ethnikos Piraeus
- 1986: Unión Magdalena
- * Club domestic league appearances and goals

José Francisco Sasía Lugo (27 December 1933 – 30 August 1996) was a Uruguayan footballer who played as a forward. He played for clubs of Uruguay, Argentina and Paraguay and in the Uruguay national team in the 1962 and 1966 FIFA World Cups.

== Honours ==
=== Player ===
Peñarol

- Uruguayan Primera División: 1961, 1962, 1963
- Copa Libertadores: 1961
- Copa Intercontinental: 1961

Olimpia

- Paraguayan Primera División: 1969

Uruguay

- Copa América: 1959
