= Ángel Cabrera (footballer) =

Uruguayan footballer (1939–2010)

Personal information
- Full name: Ángel Ruben Cabrera Santana
- Date of birth: 9 October 1939
- Place of birth: Uruguay
- Date of death: 15 November 2010 (aged 71)
- Position: Forward

Senior career*
Years	Team	Apps	(Gls)
1960–1965	C.A. Peñarol		
1965	Newell's Old Boys		
1965–1966	Montevideo Wanderers		
1967	C.A. Peñarol		

International career
- Uruguay
- * Club domestic league appearances and goals

Ángel Ruben Cabrera Santana (Mercedes, Uruguay, 9 October 1939 – 15 November 2010) was a Uruguayan football forward who played for Uruguay in the 1962 FIFA World Cup. He also played for C.A. Peñarol.

He died in 2010, aged 71. His remains are buried in Mercedes.
