= Héctor González (footballer, born 1937) =

Colombian footballer (1937–2015)

Héctor González Garzón
Personal information
- Full name: Héctor González Garzón
- Date of birth: 7 July 1937
- Place of birth: Colombia
- Date of death: 23 August 2015 (aged 78)

International career
Years	Team	Apps	(Gls)
- Colombia

Héctor González Garzón (born 7 July 1937, died 23 August 2015) was a Colombian former footballer. He was a member of the Colombia national football team at the 1962 FIFA World Cup in Chile, and he played in the team's 2nd and 3rd games against the Soviet Union and Yugoslavia.
