= Karol Galba =

Slovak football referee

Karol Galba (2 February 1921 – 15 November 2009) was a Slovak football official, probably best known for being a linesman during the 1966 FIFA World Cup final at Wembley Stadium.

== Background ==
Galba referred in the Czechoslovak First League from 1950 to 1969. He became an international referee in 1952, and featured at two world cups: the 1962 FIFA World Cup and the 1966 FIFA World Cup four years later. Along with Swiss referee Gottfried Dienst and Soviet assistant referee Tofiq Bahramov, he was part of the officiating team at the 1966 FIFA World Cup final. Galba became President of the UEFA Referees' Committee when it was first instituted in 1968. He later worked as a match observer for UEFA.

In September 2003 Galba received the UEFA Order of Merit in Ruby. He died at the age of 88 in November 2009.
