= Rolando Serrano =

Colombian footballer and manager (1938–2022)

Personal information
- Full name: José Rolando Serrano Lazaro
- Date of birth: 13 November 1938
- Place of birth: Pamplona, Colombia
- Date of death: 13 June 2022 (aged 83)
- Place of death: Cúcuta, Colombia
- Height: 1.71 m (5 ft 7 in)
- Position: Midfielder

Senior career*
Years	Team	Apps	(Gls)
1957–1960	Cúcuta Deportivo		
1961–1963	América de Cali		
1964	Cúcuta Deportivo		
1964–1965	Unión Magdalena		
1966–1967	Millonarios		
1968–1969	Atlético Junior		

International career
- Colombia

Managerial career
- Cúcuta Deportivo
- * Club domestic league appearances and goals

José Rolando Serrano Lazaro (13 November 1938 – 13 June 2022) was a Colombian footballer who played as a midfielder.

== Career ==
Serrano helped the Colombia national team qualify for its first ever World Cup: 1962 FIFA World Cup. It lost both its first and third group stage matches, but drew the Soviet Union team under 1960 European Football Championship winning coach Gavriil Kachalin. He also competed for Colombia in the 1963 South American Championship.

== Later years ==
After retiring from playing, Serrano was appointed the manager of local club Cúcuta Deportivo in January 1982.

Serrano died on 13 June 2022, at the age of 83.

== Personal life ==
His granddaughter Camila Osorio is a tennis player.
