= Hermán Aceros =

Colombian footballer (1938–2018)

Personal information
- Full name: Hermán Aceros Bueno
- Date of birth: 30 September 1938
- Place of birth: Bucaramanga, Colombia
- Date of death: 29 October 2018 (aged 80)
- Place of death: Floridablanca, Colombia

International career
| Years | Team | Apps | (Gls) |
| 1961–1962 | Colombia | 5 | (1) |

Hermán Aceros Bueno (30 September 1938 – 29 October 2018) was a Colombian footballer. He competed for the Colombia national football team at the 1962 FIFA World Cup which was held in Chile.

== Career ==
Aceros played football as a right and left winger, central forward and attacking midfielder in Colombia with Atlético Bucaramanga, Millonarios, Deportivo Cali, Independiente Medellín and Deportivo Pereira. He suffered a career-ending knee injury while playing for Real Cartagena in 1972.

After he retired from playing, Aceros became a football coach. He managed Bucaramanga, Deportes Tolima, Liga del Magdalena and Independiente Medellín in Colombia, before moving to Venezuela to manage Minervén.
