= Jaime González (Colombian footballer) =

Colombian footballer (1938-1985)

Personal information
- Full name: Jaime González Ortíz
- Date of birth: April 1, 1938
- Place of birth: Colombia
- Date of death: 1985

International career
Years	Team	Apps	(Gls)
- Colombia

Jaime "Charol" González Ortíz (1 April 1938 – 1985) was a Colombian footballer. He was part of the Colombia national football team at the 1962 FIFA World Cup, which was held in Chile.
