= Marino Klinger =

Colombian footballer (1936-1975)

Personal information
- Full name: Marino Klinger Salazar
- Date of birth: 7 February 1936
- Place of birth: Buenaventura, Colombia
- Date of death: 19 May 1975 (aged 39)
- Position: Forward

Senior career*
| Years | Team | Apps | (Gls) |
| 1957–1966 | Millonarios | | |
| 1967 | Santa Fe | | |

International career
- Colombia
- * Club domestic league appearances and goals

Marino Klinger Salazar (7 February 1936 – 19 May 1975) was a Colombian footballer who played as a forward. He was a member of the Colombia national team at the 1962 FIFA World Cup which was held in Chile.

== Career ==
Born in Buenaventura, Valle del Cauca, Klinger played club football for amateur side Oro del Puerto and local Buenaventura and Valle del Cauca department selections. He played professionally for Millonarios, where he won the Colombian league five times. He also played for Santa Fe.

== Personal ==
Klinger died in an automobile accident in Cali in 1975.
