= Antonio Rada =

Colombian footballer (1937-2014)

Personal information
- Full name: José Antonio Rada Angulo
- Date of birth: 13 June 1937
- Place of birth: Sabanalarga, Colombia
- Date of death: 1 June 2014 (aged 76)
- Place of death: Barranquilla, Colombia
- Position: Midfielder

International career
Years	Team	Apps	(Gls)
1962	Colombia	2	(1)

José Antonio "Toño" Rada Angulo (13 June 1937 – 1 June 2014) was a Colombian footballer who played as a midfielder.

== International career ==
He played two matches for the Colombia national football team at the 1962 FIFA World Cup, which was held in Chile. In that tournament he played an important role in the match between his team and the USSR where he scored a goal and passed the ball for another. The final score was 4–4 and it was the first point for Colombia in a World Cup.
