= Francisco Zuluaga =

Colombian footballer (1929-1993)

Personal information
- Full name: Francisco Zuluaga Rodríguez
- Date of birth: 4 February 1929
- Place of birth: Medellín, Colombia
- Date of death: 8 November 1993 (aged 64)

International career
Years	Team	Apps	(Gls)
1957–1962	Colombia	9	(1)

Francisco "Cobo" Zuluaga Rodríguez (4 February 1929 in Medellín, Colombia – 8 November 1993) was a Colombian footballer. He competed for the Colombia national football team at the 1962 FIFA World Cup, which was held in Chile.

== Playing career ==
=== Club ===
At age 15, Zuluaga began playing as a central defender for Medellín side 7 de Agosto. Next, he joined Unión Indulana where he would be recruited by Millonarios. He made his professional debut with Millonarios in 1948, and won five Colombian league titles with the club. He finished his career playing for Santa Fe and Atlético Nacional.

== Managerial career ==
After retiring as a player, Zuluaga became a football manager. He had a spell in charge of the Colombia national team between 1968 and 1969 during its failed bid to qualify for the 1970 FIFA World Cup in Mexico.
