= Traditional derby =

Club football rivalry between ŠK Slovan Bratislava and FC Spartak Trnava

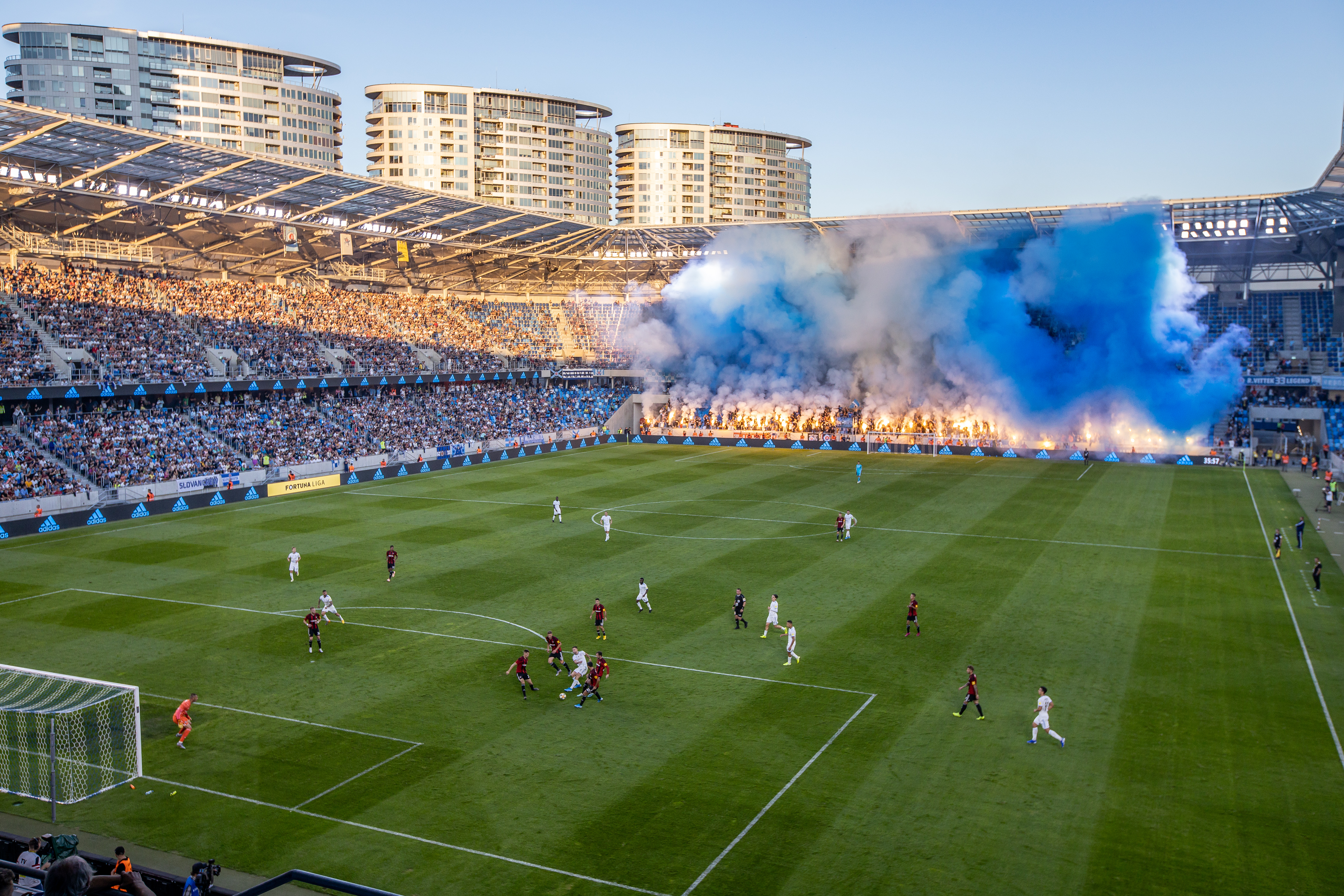
- Slovan Bratislava vs FC Spartak Trnava in 2019, at the Tehelné pole
- Other names: Tradičné derby Západoslovenské derby
- Location: Bratislava and Trnava, Slovakia
- Teams: Slovan Bratislava; Spartak Trnava
- First meeting: 21 March 1926
- Latest meeting: Spartak Trnava 0–3 Slovan Bratislava; Slovak League, round 11; 17 October 2026
- Next meeting: Slovan Bratislava vs. Spartak Trnava; Slovak League, round 22; 27 February 2027
- Stadiums: Tehelné pole Štadión Antona Malatinského

Statistics
- Total meetings: 181
- Most wins: Slovan Bratislava (89)

Traditional derby (Slovak: Tradičné derby) also known as the West-Slovakia derby (Slovak: Západoslovenské derby) is the name for the rivalry between the two Slovak football teams ŠK Slovan Bratislava and FC Spartak Trnava. The two teams are the most successful clubs in Slovakia. The game is considered the most prestigious match in the Slovak football calendar.

Location of both teams

== Honours ==
As of end of 2025/26 season

Competition	Slovan	Trnava
Slovak League (1926–1933; 1939–1944; 1993–present)	24	1
Czechoslovak League (1935–1939; 1945–1993)	8	5
Slovak Cup (1969–present)	17	9
Czechoslovak Cup (1961–1993)	5	4
Slovak Super Cup (1993–2016)	4	1
UEFA Cup Winners' Cup (1960–1999)	1	0
Total	59	20

== Statistics ==
As of 17 October 2026

Matches	Slovan wins	Draws	Trnava wins	Goal difference
181	89	42	50	282:177

Note: Only official domestic league games since 1939 are included.

== Results ==
=== League ===
Czechoslovakia (1947–1993)
	Slovan – Trnava					Trnava – Slovan				
Season	R.	Date	Venue	Atten.	Score	R.	Date	Venue	Atten.	Score
1947–48	9	09–11–1947	Tehelné pole Stadium	8,000	4–1	19	27–05–1948	Spartak Stadium	18,000	0–3
1948	9	07–11–1948	Tehelné pole Stadium	10,000	0–1					
1949	10	12–06–1949	Tehelné pole Stadium	10,000	1–4	23	06–11–1949	Spartak Stadium	7,000	2–5
1950	14	10–08–1950	Tehelné pole Stadium	20,000	1–1	1	05–03–1950	Spartak Stadium	18,000	0–1
1952	2	16–03–1952	Tehelné pole Stadium	20,000	0–0	15	17–08–1952	Spartak Stadium	15,000	1–0
1955	21	30–10–1955	Tehelné pole Stadium	14,000	1–0	9	29–05–1955	Spartak Stadium	10,000	1–0
1956	14	04–10–1956	Tehelné pole Stadium	22,000	1–2	3	25–03–1956	Spartak Stadium	12,000	0–3
1957–58						9	12–05–1957	Spartak Stadium	15,000	1–0
1957–58	32	11–05–1958	Tehelné pole Stadium	15,000	1–1	22	10–11–1957	Spartak Stadium	20,000	4–2
1958–59	15	28–03–1959	Tehelné pole Stadium	18,000	4–1	3	24–08–1958	Spartak Stadium	14,000	0–1
1959–60	18	02–04–1960	Tehelné pole Stadium	30,000	0–1	5	13–09–1959	Spartak Stadium	10,000	0–0
1960–61	25	03–06–1961	Tehelné pole Stadium	12,069	6–1	12	13–11–1960	Spartak Stadium	12,000	0–1
1961–62	3	26–08–1961	Tehelné pole Stadium	25,000	2–0	16	18–03–1962	Spartak Stadium	7,000	2–0
1964–65	23	19–05–1965	Tehelné pole Stadium	13,000	1–2	1	09–08–1964	Spartak Stadium	23,000	1–1
1965–66	8	05–09–1965	Tehelné pole Stadium	28,000	3–0	17	10–04–1966	Spartak Stadium	18,000	2–0
1966–67	8	02–10–1966	Tehelné pole Stadium	35,000	2–1	26	10–06–1967	Spartak Stadium	12,000	1–0
1967–68	1	13–08–1967	Tehelné pole Stadium	30,000	2–0	14	17–03–1968	Spartak Stadium	25,000	0–3 (awd.)
1968–69	19	20–04–1969	Tehelné pole Stadium	33,908	1–1	6	13–10–1968	Spartak Stadium	12,632	3–0
1969–70	9	28–09–1969	Tehelné pole Stadium	38,413	2–1	24	15–04–1970	Spartak Stadium	21,159	1–1
1970–71	13	08–11–1970	Tehelné pole Stadium	19,001	1–1	29	06–06–1971	Spartak Stadium	17,000	2–0
1971–72	20	21–04–1972	Tehelné pole Stadium	36,800	2–2	5	29–08–1971	Spartak Stadium	22,500	1–1
1972–73	4	24–08–1972	Tehelné pole Stadium	23,450	0–0	19	10–06–1973	Spartak Stadium	28,000	2–0
1973–74	14	23–11–1973	Tehelné pole Stadium	16,717	2–0	29	08–06–1974	Spartak Stadium	17,656	3–2
1974–75	20	22–03–1975	Tehelné pole Stadium	31,327	0–0	5	04–09–1974	Spartak Stadium	18,326	0–4
1975–76	28	27–05–1976	Tehelné pole Stadium	12,833	2–1	13	03–11–1975	Spartak Stadium	13,622	0–2
1976–77	25	24–04–1977	Tehelné pole Stadium	9,445	0–2	10	30–11–1976	Spartak Stadium	8,167	2–0
1977–78	1	18–08–1977	Tehelné pole Stadium	24,562	1–2	16	18–02–1978	Spartak Stadium	7,886	1–1
1978–79	29	06–06–1979	Tehelné pole Stadium	10,083	3–0	14	25–11–1978	Spartak Stadium	4,587	1–0
1979–80	3	19–08–1979	Tehelné pole Stadium	8,765	1–0	18	02–03–1980	Spartak Stadium	8,677	1–1
1980–81	12	09–11–1980	Tehelné pole Stadium	3,282	1–2	27	17–05–1981	Spartak Stadium	6,144	3–1
1981–82	28	24–04–1982	Tehelné pole Stadium	2,821	2–1	13	21–11–1981	Spartak Stadium	2,797	3–1
1982–83	10	30–10–1982	Tehelné pole Stadium	1,632	2–0	25	28–05–1983	Spartak Stadium	7,052	1–0
1983–84	1	13–08–1983	Tehelné pole Stadium	11,187	0–1	16	03–03–1984	Spartak Stadium	10,002	2–1
1984–85	24	08–05–1985	Tehelné pole Stadium	3,297	1–2	9	21–10–1984	Spartak Stadium	5,176	2–1
1988–89	22	07–04–1989	Tehelné pole Stadium	15,063	1–0	6	11–09–1988	Spartak Stadium	12,237	1–0
1989–90	9	28–10–1989	Tehelné pole Stadium	7,588	2–0	25	15–04–1990	Spartak Stadium	5,073	1–1
1991–92	28	24–05–1992	Tehelné pole Stadium	15,597	4–1	12	03–11–1991	Spartak Stadium	7,188	0–2
1992–93	27	16–05–1993	Tehelné pole Stadium	12,680	4–1	11	31–10–1992	Spartak Stadium	4,901	1–2
Slovakia (1993–present)
Season	R.	Date	Venue	Atten.	Score	R.	Date	Venue	Atten.	Score
1993–94	5	11–09–1993	Tehelné pole Stadium	8,723	3–1	16	27–11–1993	Spartak Stadium	5,000	0–1
1994–95	10	05–10–1994	Tehelné pole Stadium	5,605	0–0	21	08–04–1995	Spartak Stadium	20,850	0–0
1994–95	24	29–04–1995	Tehelné pole Stadium	10,232	1–0	29	27–05–1995	Spartak Stadium	9,117	1–1
1995–96	14	19–11–1995	Tehelné pole Stadium	16,102	3–0	3	10–08–1995	Spartak Stadium	15,109	1–1
1995–96	31	06–06–1996	Tehelné pole Stadium	7,172	5–2	26	04–05–1996	Spartak Stadium	20,318	0–1
1996–97	14	16–11–1996	Tehelné pole Stadium	22,354	3–1	29	28–05–1997	Spartak Stadium	19,235	4–0
1997–98	18	15–03–1998	Tehelné pole Stadium	13,329	0–0	3	16–08–1997	Spartak Stadium	18,082	4–0
1998–99	30	29–05–1999	Tehelné pole Stadium	12,226	0–1	15	20–11–1998	Anton Malatinský Stadium	16,913	1–1
1999–00	26	28–04–2000	Tehelné pole Stadium	8,147	3–0	11	15–10–1999	Anton Malatinský Stadium	5,837	0–0
2000–01	15	04–11–2000	Tehelné pole Stadium	3,634	4–2	6	19–08–2000	Anton Malatinský Stadium	4,422	1–1
2000–01	33	18–05–2001	Tehelné pole Stadium	1,964	4–1	24	06–04–2001	Anton Malatinský Stadium	5,059	1–2
2002–03	7	24–08–2002	Tehelné pole Stadium	10,088	2–1	16	10–11–2002	Anton Malatinský Stadium	6,478	1–2
2002–03	25	12–04–2003	Tehelné pole Stadium	4,832	2–1	34	31–05–2003	Anton Malatinský Stadium	2,982	4–3
2003–04	16	16–11–2003	Tehelné pole Stadium	2,232	0–4	7	31–08–2003	Anton Malatinský Stadium	6,484	5–3
2003–04	34	01–06–2004	Tehelné pole Stadium	1,930	0–1	25	10–04–2004	Anton Malatinský Stadium	8,758	2–2
2006–07	10	16–09–2006	Tehelné pole Stadium	7,263	2–0	21	18–11–2006	Anton Malatinský Stadium	4,554	2–1
2007–08	22	22–03–2008	Tehelné pole Stadium	10,856	2–3	11	30–09–2007	Anton Malatinský Stadium	15,132	1–1
2007–08						33	31–05–2008	Anton Malatinský Stadium	10,380	0–1
2008–09	19	08–04–2009	Tehelné pole Stadium	12,870	1–2	8	23–09–2008	Anton Malatinský Stadium	7,380	1–1
2008–09						30	17–05–2009	Anton Malatinský Stadium	N/A	1–1
2009–10	14	25–10–2009	Tehelné pole Stadium	8,897	1–1	3	26–07–2009	Anton Malatinský Stadium	10,875	0–2
2009–10						25	28–03–2010	Anton Malatinský Stadium	9,863	0–3
2010–11	8	12–09–2010	Pasienky Stadium	6,214	1–1	19	25–02–2011	Anton Malatinský Stadium	8,763	1–3
2010–11	30	17–05–2011	Pasienky Stadium	3,805	3–0					
2011–12	4	07–08–2011	Pasienky Stadium	5,486	2–1	15	06–11–2011	Anton Malatinský Stadium	8,482	2–0
2011–12	26	08–04–2012	Pasienky Stadium	4,950	0–0					
2012–13	15	02–11–2012	Pasienky Stadium	3,853	0–1	4	05–08–2012	Anton Malatinský Stadium	8,544	0–1
2012–13						26	13–04–2013	Anton Malatinský Stadium	7,011	0–0
2013–14	22	16–03–2014	Pasienky Stadium	5,321	2–0	11	21–09–2013	Anton Malatinský Stadium	3,230	1–3
2013–14						33	31–05–2014	Anton Malatinský Stadium	3,050	1–2
2014–15	14	10–03–2015	Pasienky Stadium	4,353	0–0	3	30–10–2014	Anton Malatinský Stadium	2,765	4–0
2014–15						25	11–04–2015	Anton Malatinský Stadium	3,250	0–0
2015–16	6	25–08–2015	Pasienky Stadium	1,837	2–0	17	22–11–2015	Anton Malatinský Stadium	15,109	0–0
2015–16	28	20–04–2016	Pasienky Stadium	4,250	4–1					
2016–17	18	04–12–2016	Pasienky Stadium	1,046	0–1	7	27–08–2016	Anton Malatinský Stadium	7,637	0–0
2016–17						29	26–04–2017	Anton Malatinský Stadium	3,569	0–3
2017–18	16	19–11–2017	Pasienky Stadium	3,856	1–0	5	19–08–2017	Anton Malatinský Stadium	8,580	1–2
2017–18	29	28–04–2018	Pasienky Stadium	6,352	2–1	26	07–04–2018	Anton Malatinský Stadium	13,123	1–0
2018–19	21	03–03–2019	Tehelné pole Stadium	22,500	2–0	10	29–09–2018	Anton Malatinský Stadium	6,346	1–2
2019–20	8	15–09–2019	Tehelné pole Stadium	14,933	2–0	19	16–02–2020	Anton Malatinský Stadium	11,126	0–0
2019–20	27	11–07–2020	Tehelné pole Stadium	6,253	0–0					
2020–21	6	12–09–2020	Tehelné pole Stadium	258 (Note: Limited capacity due to preventive measures against the COVID-19 pandemic.)	2–0	17	13–12–2020	Anton Malatinský Stadium	0	0–3
2020–21	27	17–04–2021	Tehelné pole Stadium	0	1–2	29	02–05–2021	Anton Malatinský Stadium	0	3–0
2021–22	22	26–02–2022	Tehelné pole Stadium	7,533	0–0	11	17–10–2021	Anton Malatinský Stadium	9,000	0–3 (awd.)
2021–22	30	01–05–2022	Tehelné pole Stadium	5,601	1–0	26	03–04–2022	Anton Malatinský Stadium	5,467	0–1
2022–23	22	04–03–2023	Tehelné pole Stadium	11,480	4–1	11	18–09–2022	Anton Malatinský Stadium	9,047	0–0
2022–23	29	28–04–2023	Tehelné pole Stadium	10,540	1–0	25	02–04–2023	Anton Malatinský Stadium	9,677	0–0
2023–24	22	02–03–2024	Tehelné pole Stadium	11,130	2–0	11	22–10–2023	Anton Malatinský Stadium	12,528	1–2
2023–24	24	17–03–2024	Tehelné pole Stadium	10,050	0–2	28	21–04–2024	Anton Malatinský Stadium	8,035	1–2
2024–25	22	01–03–2025	Tehelné pole Stadium	12,894	0–1	11	19–10–2024	Anton Malatinský Stadium	13,583	0–1
2024–25	24	16–03–2025	Tehelné pole Stadium	11,644	1–1	26	19–04–2025	Anton Malatinský Stadium	7,537	2–3
2025–26	22	28–02–2026	Tehelné pole Stadium	14,539	4–0	11	18–10–2025	Anton Malatinský Stadium	17,011	0–2
2025–26	27	11–04–2026	Tehelné pole Stadium	13,621	2–2	29	26–04–2026	Anton Malatinský Stadium	10,437	0–1
2026–27	22	27–02–2027	Tehelné pole Stadium			11	17–10–2026	Anton Malatinský Stadium	16,541	0–3

=== Cup ===
Czechoslovakia (1960–1993)
Season	Round	Leg	Date	Venue	Atten.	Match	Score	Winner
1969–70	Semi-final	—	18–03–1970	Tehelné pole Stadium	12,000	Slovan – Trnava	3–0	Slovan
1970–71	Final	First	07–04–1971	Spartak Stadium	10,000	Trnava – Slovan	2–0	Trnava
1970–71	Final	Second	05–05–1971	Tehelné pole Stadium	15,000	Slovan – Trnava	1–0	Trnava
1971–72	Final	First	17–06–1972	Tehelné pole Stadium	6,000	Slovan – Trnava	1–2	Slovan
1971–72	Final	Second	21–06–1972	Spartak Stadium	18,000	Trnava – Slovan	1–4 (aet)	Slovan
1973–74	Final	First	29–05–1974	Tehelné pole Stadium	8,000	Slovan – Trnava	0–0	Slovan
1973–74	Final	Second	05–06–1974	Spartak Stadium	10,000	Trnava – Slovan	2–2; 5–6 (pen.)	Slovan
1975–76	Semi-final	—		Spartak Stadium		Trnava – Slovan	0–2	Slovan
1981–82	Quarter-final	First	30–09–1981	Tehelné pole Stadium		Slovan – Trnava	2–0	Slovan
1981–82	Quarter-final	Second	21–10–1981	Spartak Stadium		Trnava – Slovan	2–0; 3–4 (pen.)	Slovan
1986–87	Round of 16	—		Tehelné pole Stadium		Slovan – Trnava	0–0 (aet); 3–1 (pen.)	Slovan
Slovakia (1993–present)
Season	Round	Leg	Date	Venue	Atten.	Match	Score	Winner
1998–99	Semi-final	First	16–03–1999	Tehelné pole Stadium	6,500	Slovan – Trnava	1–1	Slovan
1998–99	Semi-final	Second	06–04–1999	Anton Malatinský Stadium	7,541	Trnava – Slovan	1–2	Slovan
2009–10	Final	—	11–05–2010	Zemplín Stadium	3,752	Trnava – Slovan	0–6	Slovan
2010–11	Semi-final	First	05–04–2011	Pasienky Stadium	4,900	Slovan – Trnava	2–2	Slovan
2010–11	Semi-final	Second	19–04–2011	Anton Malatinský Stadium	2,586	Trnava – Slovan	2–3	Slovan
2017–18	Semi-final	First	04–04–2018	Pasienky Stadium	2,141	Slovan – Trnava	1–1	Slovan
2017–18	Semi-final	Second	18–04–2018	Anton Malatinský Stadium	6,180	Trnava – Slovan	1–1; 3–4 (pen.)	Slovan
2021–22	Final	—	08–05–2022	Tehelné pole Stadium	10,411	Slovan – Trnava	1–2 (aet)	Trnava
2022–23	Final	—	01–05–2023	Anton Malatinský Stadium	15,427	Trnava – Slovan	3–1 (aet)	Trnava
2024–25	Semi-final	First	02–04–2025	Tehelné pole Stadium	7,116	Slovan – Trnava	2–1	Trnava
2024–25	Semi-final	Second	16–04–2025	Anton Malatinský Stadium	10,132	Trnava – Slovan	2–1; 4–2 (pen.)	Trnava
2025–26	Round of 16	—	18–02–2026	Anton Malatinský Stadium	8,086	Trnava – Slovan	1–1; 5–3 (pen.)	Trnava

== Head-to-head league ranking ==
Slovakia (1993–present)

P.	94	95	96	97	98	99	00	01	02	03	04	05	06	07	08	09	10	11	12	13	14	15	16	17	18	19	20	21	22	23	24	25	26
1	1	1	1			1										1		1		1	1				1	1	1	1	1	1	1	1	1
2				2	2			2									2		2				2	2	2								
3			3	3		3	3			3			3	3		3			3		3	3						3	3	3	3	3	3
4							4			4	4				4			4				4	4				4						
5					5							5			5																		
6		6							6															6									
7	7																7									7							
8																																	
9														9																			
10								10			10																						
11																				11													
12																																	
13																																	
14																																	
15																																	
16																																	
2. liga
1									1																								
2													2																				
3												3																					

Source: rsssf.org

Czechoslovakia (1947–1993)

P.	48	49	50	51	52	53	54	55	56	58	59	60	61	62	63	64	65	66	67	68	69	70	71	72	73	74	75	76	77	78	79	80	81	82	83	84	85	86	87	88	89	90	91	92	93
1		1	1	1				1												1	1	1	1	1	1	1	1																	1	
2					2				2			2				2			2	2	2	2		2				2															2		
3	3												3						3																										3
4										4		4																																	
5	5				5		5																																			5			
6																	6	6					6				6																		
7											7			7	7			7								7						7				7					7				
8								8			8														8				8	8					8										
9		9				9				9																				9			9			9	9								
10													10				10											10			10		10	10				10		10					
11																																11							11						
12																															12										12				
13			13											13																					13										
14																													14					14										14	
15																																										15			
16																																					16								16
2nd tier
1				1			1									1																								1			1		
2																																						2	2						
3																																													
4						4									4																														

Source: rsssf.org

== Players who played for both clubs ==
Slovan then Trnava

- 2023: (Slovakia) Michal Šulla
- 2022: (Czech Republic) Erik Daniel
- 2022: (Slovakia) Samuel Štefánik (via three clubs)
- 2019: (Slovakia) Filip Oršula (via Slovan Liberec)
- 2019: (Slovakia) Timotej Záhumenský (on loan from DAC Dunajská Streda)
- 2018: (Slovakia) Erik Grendel (via Górnik Zabrze)
- 2013: (Slovakia) Peter Štepanovský (on loan from Senica)
- 2012: (Slovakia) Peter Kuračka (for Slovan in youth days)
- 2011: (Czech Republic) Martin Vyskočil (via Zlín and Žilina)
- 2001: (Slovakia) Erik Ježík
- 2001: (Slovakia) Miroslav Kriss
- 1999: (Slovakia) Jozef Mužlay
- 1997: (Brazil) Luís Fábio Gomes
- 1997: (Slovakia) Dušan Tittel (later returned to Slovan)
- 1996: (Slovakia) Jaroslav Timko (via Drnovice)
- 1994: (Slovakia) Stanislav Moravec (via Inter)
- 1992: (Slovakia) Jozef Juriga (on loan from Slovan)
- 1993: (Slovakia) Boris Kitka (on loan from Slovan)
- 1993: (Slovakia) Ondrej Krištofík
- 1993: (Slovakia) Ján Zlocha (later returned to Slovan)
- 1992: (Slovakia) Erik Chytil (on loan from Slovan)
- 1992: (Slovakia) Juraj Kakaš (on loan from Slovan)
- (Slovakia) Stanislav Fišan
- 1987: (Slovakia) Vladimír Bechera
- 1984: (Slovakia) Ivan Hucko
- 1957: (Slovakia) Ján Hikl
- 1957: (Slovakia) Juraj Kadlec (via Žilina)

Trnava then Slovan

- 2025: (Ghana) Kelvin Ofori
- 2024: (Slovakia) Dominik Takáč
- 2023: (Greece) Kyriakos Savvidis
- 2020: (Brazil) Lucas Lovat
- 2019: (Suriname) Myenty Abena
- 2016: (Brazil) Cléber
- 2012: (Slovakia) Kamil Kopúnek (via Saturn and Bari)
- 2008: (Slovakia) Peter Černák (via four clubs)
- 2005: (Slovakia) Pavol Masaryk
- 2005: (Slovakia) Rastislav Tomovčík (via four clubs)
- 2004: (Slovakia) Branislav Rzeszoto (via Žilina and Zlín)
- 2001: (Slovakia) Marek Ujlaky (via Drnovice, then returned to Trnava)
- 1999: (Slovakia) Igor Bališ
- 1996: (Slovakia) Ľubomír Vnuk (via Uničov)
- 1995: (Slovakia) Marek Boskovič
- 1995: (Slovakia) František Klinovský
- 1995: (Slovakia) Miroslav König
- (Slovakia) Marián Černý
- 1988: (Slovakia) Vladimír Ekhardt
- 1978: (Slovakia) Vojtěch Varadín (via ČH Bratislava)
- 1963: (Slovakia) Jozef Adamec (via Dukla Prague, then returned to Trnava)
- 1949: (Slovakia) Michal Benedikovič
- 1949: (Slovakia) Anton Malatinský
- 1942: (Slovakia) František Masarovič

Managers for both clubs

- (Slovakia) Jozef Adamec
- (Slovakia) Dušan Galis
- (Slovakia) Anton Malatinský
- (Slovakia) Karol Pecze
- (Slovakia) Dušan Radolský
- (Slovakia) Miroslav Svoboda
- (Slovakia) Valér Švec
