= Josef Masopust =

Czech footballer and manager (1931–2015)

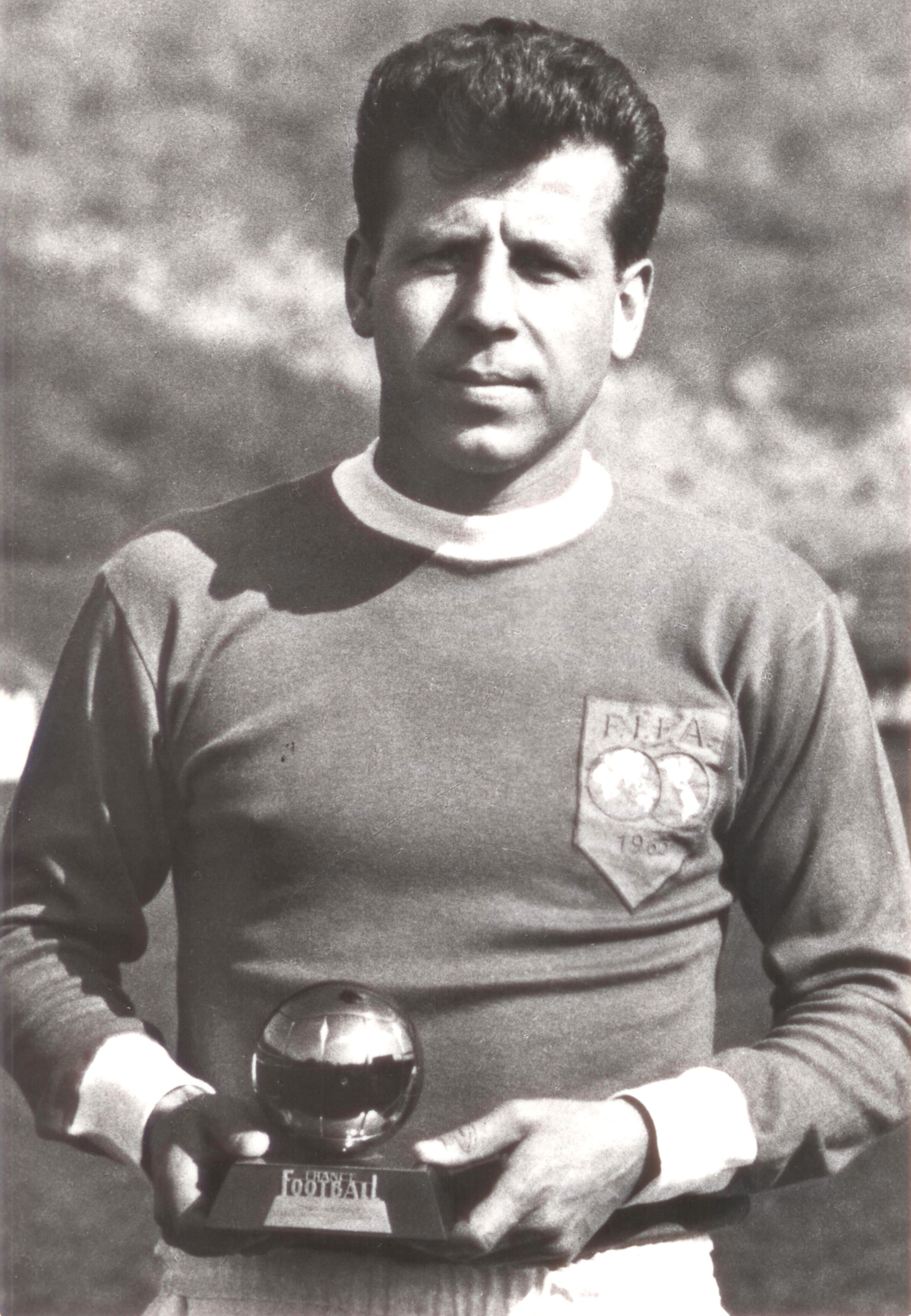
- Masopust with the 1962 Ballon d'Or

Personal information
- Date of birth: 9 February 1931
- Place of birth: Střimice, Czechoslovakia
- Date of death: 29 June 2015 (aged 84)
- Place of death: Prague, Czech Republic
- Height: 1.77 m (5 ft 10 in)
- Position: Midfielder

Youth career
- 1945–1950: ZSJ Uhlomost Most

Senior career*
Years	Team	Apps	(Gls)
1950–1952	ZSJ Technomat Teplice	54	(10)
1952–1968	Dukla Prague	386	(79)
1968–1970	Crossing Molenbeek	43	(9)
Total		483	(98)

International career
1954–1966	Czechoslovakia	63	(10)

Managerial career
- 1973–1976: Dukla Prague
- 1976–1980: Zbrojovka Brno
- 1980–1984: Hasselt
- 1984–1987: Czechoslovakia
- 1988–1991: Indonesia U19
- 1992: Zbrojovka Brno
- 1993–1996: FK Pelikán Děčín
Medal record
Men's football
Representing Czechoslovakia
Central European International Cup
Gold medal – first place	1955–60 Europe
FIFA World Cup
Silver medal – second place	1962 Chile
UEFA European Championship
Bronze medal – third place	1960 France
- * Club domestic league appearances and goals

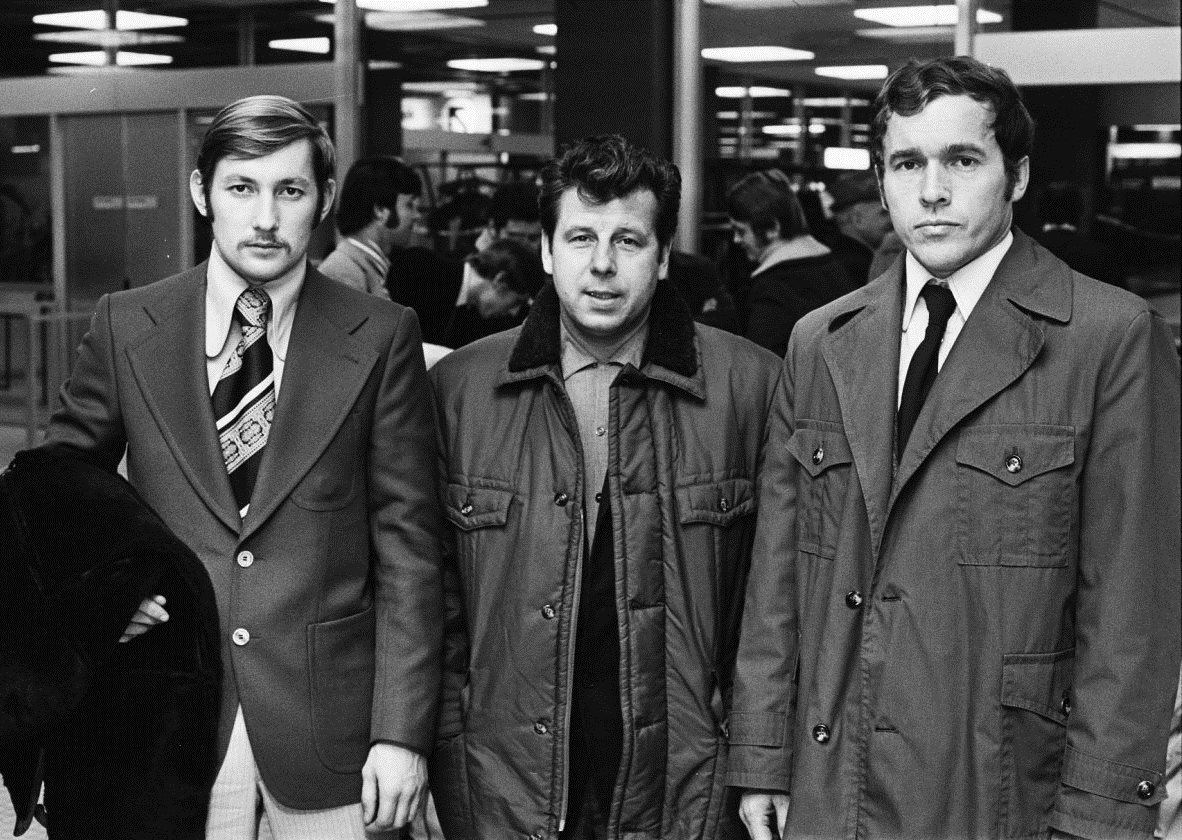
(l-r) Zdeněk Nehoda, Masopust and Ivo Viktor in 1974

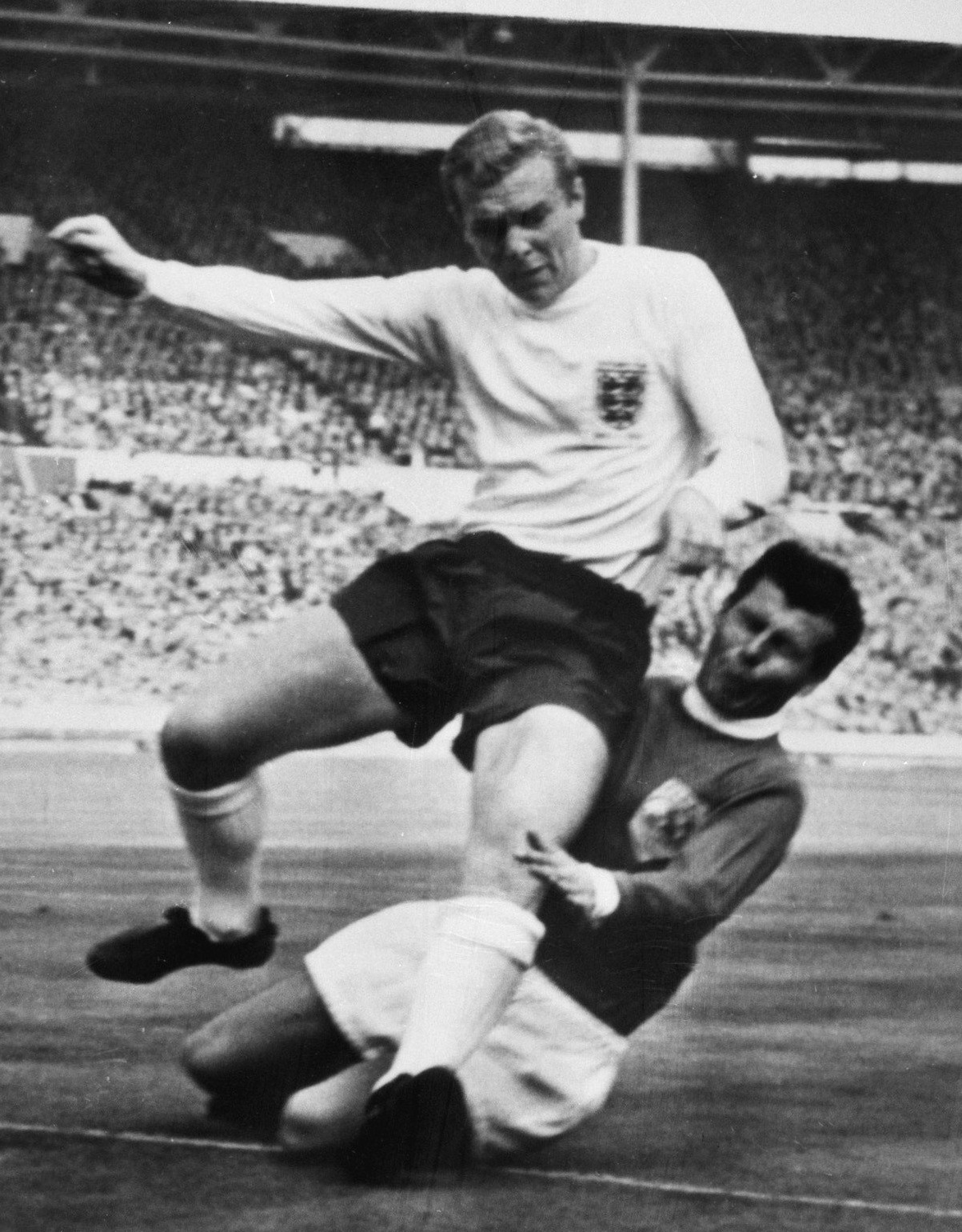
Bobby Moore (left) vs. Masopust at the 1963 England v Rest of the World football match

Josef Masopust (9 February 1931 – 29 June 2015) was a Czech football player and coach. He played as midfielder and was a key player for Czechoslovakia, helping them reach the 1962 FIFA World Cup Final. He was capped 63 times, scoring ten goals for his national team.

He was named European Footballer of the Year in 1962. In November 2003, to celebrate UEFA's Jubilee, Masopust was selected as his country's Golden Player by the Football Association of the Czech Republic as their most outstanding player of the past 50 years. He was named by Pelé as one of the top 125 greatest living footballers in March 2004. He is regarded as one of the greatest midfielders of all time.

== Life ==
Masopust was born on 9 February 1931 in Střimice (today non-existent village in the territory of Most).

== Club career ==
Masopust's first club was lowly ZSJ Uhlomost Most, but ZSJ Technomat Teplice (renamed to ZSJ Vodotechna Teplice in 1951) signed him as a 19-year-old left-half and gave him his top-flight debut. Then, in 1952, he joined a Czechoslovak Armed Forces football club under name of ATK Praha (renamed to ÚDA Praha in 1953 and to Dukla Prague in winter 1956). Masopust won eight league championships and three national cups with Dukla. They also reached the semi-finals of the 1966–67 European Cup, losing to the eventual winners of the competition (Celtic).

When he eventually went abroad in 1968, he helped Crossing Molenbeek win promotion to the Belgian first division as player-coach. His coaching career continued at Dukla, however his only Czechoslovak league title as a coach came with Zbrojovka Brno in the 1977–78 season. Later, between 1984 and 1987, he led the Czechoslovakia national team, overseeing a total of 27 matches. He subsequently had a spell in Indonesia where he coached their national Olympic football team with Milan Bokša between 1988 and 1991.

== International career ==
Masopust made his international debut in October 1954, in a friendly match against Hungary. He helped Czechoslovakia qualify for the 1958 FIFA World Cup, but the team were knocked out after a play-off match against Northern Ireland. He then went on to finish the 1955-60 Central European International Cup as winner in 1960. Czechoslovakia then finished in third place in the new tournament 1960 UEFA European Football Championship, losing to the Soviet Union in the semi-final and defeating France in the third place match.

In 1962, Masopust led the Czechoslovakia team that reached the 1962 FIFA World Cup Final, losing to Brazil. He scored the opening goal in the Final, but Brazil came back to win 3–1. Because of his performance at the World Cup Finals, he was named European Footballer of the Year in 1962.

Having represented the Rest of the World team against England in 1963, Masopust was invited to play for a European International XI in the farewell match for Stanley Matthews, when the 50-year-old Matthews retired from football in 1965. Czechoslovakia failed to qualify for the 1966 World Cup; Masopust had only played in one qualification match, a 1–0 defeat against Romania in May 1965. His last international appearance was in May 1966, in a friendly match against the Soviet Union. Overall, he was capped 63 times for his national team, scoring ten goals.

== Style of play ==
Early in his career, Masopust played as a left half. By the time of the 1962 World Cup, he had moved to the centre half position.

Masopust was in a similar mould to that of the Hungarian József Bozsik; a workhorse of his team, who also created attacking opportunities. He had excellent ball control, which he utilised for both recovering the ball in defence and dribbling past opponents. Like Bozsik, Masopust was also an excellent passer of the ball. He was not great at tackling opponents, but he compensated for this by anticipating his opponents' actions and intercepting their passes.

Shackled by Czechoslovakia's "no-risk" style philosophy, Masopust's natural inclination for attack was limited, yet he still managed ten goals in 63 caps for his national team. At club level, he scored 79 times in 386 appearances for Dukla Prague. Many of his Dukla teammates also played for the national team, which gave them a greater understanding than some of their opponents.

== Legacy ==
A statue of Masopust was built outside Dukla's Stadion Juliska and was unveiled in June 2011.

== Death ==
Masopust died on 29 June 2015 at his home in Prague at the age of 84. Although no cause of death was given, Czech Television stated that he had been fighting an unspecified long, serious illness.

== Career statistics ==
=== Club ===
Appearances and goals by club, season and competition
Club	Season	League			National cup (Note: Includes Magyar Kupa, Copa del Generalísimo)		Europe		Other		Total	
Club	Season	Division	Apps	Goals	Apps	Goals	Apps	Goals	Apps	Goals	Apps	Goals
ZSJ Technomat Teplice	1950	Czechoslovak First Division	4	0	—		—		—		4	0
ZSJ Technomat Teplice	1951	Czechoslovak First Division	24	3	—		—		—		24	3
ZSJ Technomat Teplice	1952	Czechoslovak First Division	26	7	—		—		—		26	7
ZSJ Technomat Teplice	Total		54	10	0	0	0	0	0	0	54	10
Dukla Prague	1953	Czechoslovak First Division	14	3							14	3
Dukla Prague	1954	Czechoslovak First Division	12	0							12	0
Dukla Prague	1955	Czechoslovak First Division	19	1					6	2	25	3
Dukla Prague	1956	Czechoslovak First Division	17	0					2	1	19	2
Dukla Prague	1957	Czechoslovak First Division	21	4					3	1	24	5
Dukla Prague	1957-58	Czechoslovak First Division	18	1			2				20	1
Dukla Prague	1958-59	Czechoslovak First Division	20	4			4	1			24	5
Dukla Prague	1959-60	Czechoslovak First Division	21	9							21	9
Dukla Prague	1960-61	Czechoslovak First Division	26	11	2						28	11
Dukla Prague	1961-62	Czechoslovak First Division	26	3	2	2	6				34	5
Dukla Prague	1962-63	Czechoslovak First Division	25	8	1		6	1			32	9
Dukla Prague	1963-64	Czechoslovak First Division	26	4	1	1	6	1			33	6
Dukla Prague	1964-65	Czechoslovak First Division	20	1	3		5	1			28	2
Dukla Prague	1965-66	Czechoslovak First Division	19	5	4	2			4	1	27	8
Dukla Prague	1966-67	Czechoslovak First Division	16	8	4	1	8	1			28	10
Dukla Prague	1967-68	Czechoslovak First Division	13	1	4						17	1
Dukla Prague	Total		313	63	21	6	37	5	15	5	386	80
Crossing Molenbeek	1968-69	Belgian First Division	27	8					3		30	8
Crossing Molenbeek	1969-70	Belgian First Division	14	1							14	1
Crossing Molenbeek	Total		41	9	0	0	0	0	3	-	44	9
Career total			508	82	21	6	37	5	18	5	483	99

=== International ===
Appearances and goals by national team and year
National team	Year	Apps	Goals
Czechoslovakia	1954	1	0
Czechoslovakia	1955	0	0
Czechoslovakia	1956	10	2
Czechoslovakia	1957	6	0
Czechoslovakia	1958	10	2
Czechoslovakia	1959	2	0
Czechoslovakia	1960	6	2
Czechoslovakia	1961	7	1
Czechoslovakia	1962	11	3
Czechoslovakia	1963	4	0
Czechoslovakia	1964	4	0
Czechoslovakia	1965	1	0
Czechoslovakia	1966	1	0
Total		63	10

Scores and results list Czechoslovakia's goal tally first, score column indicates score after each Masopust goal.

List of international goals scored by Josef Masopust
No.	Date	Venue	Opponent	Score	Result	Competition
1	10 May 1956	Charmilles Stadium, Geneva, Switzerland	Switzerland	6–1	6–1	1955–60 Central European International Cup
2	8 August 1956	Estádio do Pacaembu, São Paulo, Brazil	Brazil	1–3	1–4	Friendly
3	30 August 1958	Strahov Stadium, Prague, Czechoslovakia	Soviet Union	1–0	1–2	Friendly
4	13 December 1958	Stadio Luigi Ferraris, Genoa, Italy	Italy	1–0	1–1	1955–60 Central European International Cup
5	1 May 1960	Strahov Stadium, Prague, Czechoslovakia	Austria	1–0	4–0	Friendly
6	22 May 1960	Stadionul 23 August, Bucharest, Romania	Romania	1–0	2–0	EURO 1960
7	29 October 1961	Strahov Stadium, Prague, Czechoslovakia	Republic of Ireland	6–1	7–1	1962 FIFA World Cup qualification
8	17 June 1962	Estadio Nacional, Santiago, Chile	Brazil	1–0	1–3	1962 FIFA World Cup Final
9	16 September 1962	Praterstadion, Vienna, Austria	Austria	2–0	6–0	Friendly
10	16 September 1962	Praterstadion, Vienna, Austria	Austria	4–0	6–0	Friendly

== Honours ==
Dukla Prague

- Czechoslovak First League: 1953, 1956, 1957–58, 1960–61, 1961–62, 1962–63, 1963–64, 1965–66
- Czechoslovak Cup: 1960–61, 1964–65, 1965–66
- International Soccer League: 1961
- American Challenge Cup: 1962, 1963, 1964

Czechoslovakia

- Central European International Cup: 1955-60
- UEFA European Championship bronze medal: 1960
- FIFA World Cup runner-up: 1962

Individual

- Ballon d'Or: 1962
- UEFA European Championship Team of the Tournament: 1960
- FIFA World Cup Silver Ball: 1962
- FIFA World Cup All-Star Team: 1962
- World Soccer World XI: 1962, 1964
- ADN Eastern European Footballer of the Season: 1962
- Czechoslovak Footballer of the Year: 1966
- UEFA Czech Golden Player: 2003
- FIFA 100
- UEFA President's Award: 2014
