= Karol Dobay =

Slovak footballer

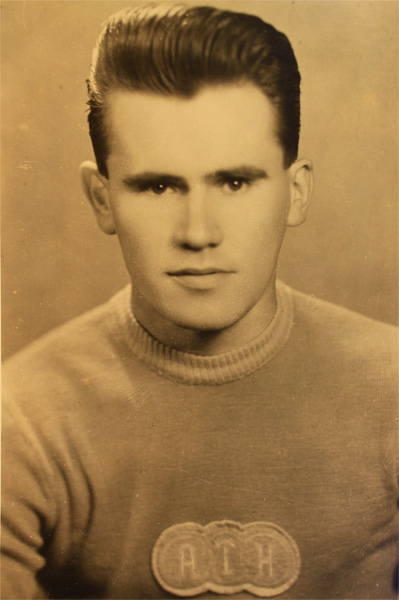

Personal information
- Date of birth: 2 December 1928
- Place of birth: Czechoslovakia
- Date of death: 20 December 1982 (aged 54)
- Place of death: Czechoslovakia
- Position: Forward

Senior career*
Years	Team	Apps	(Gls)
1947–1951	Dynamo ČSD Košice		
1952–1958	Dukla Prague		
1958–1959	Jednota Košice		

International career
1951–1953	Czechoslovakia	3	(0)
- * Club domestic league appearances and goals

Karol Dobay (2 December 1928 – 20 December 1982) was a former Slovak football striker who played for Dynamo ČSD Košice, Dukla Prague and Jednota Košice. He overall played 152 matches and scored 37 goals during his career at the Czechoslovak First League. He won three league titles for Dukla in 1953, 1956 and 1958.

Dobai made three appearances for the Czechoslovakia national football team and he debuted against Hungary on 14 October 1951.
