= Kakas =

Kakas is a Hungarian surname, its Slovak form is Kakaš. Notable people with the surname include:

- Gyula Kakas (1875–1928), Hungarian gymnast
- Juraj Kakaš (born 1971), Slovak footballer

== See also ==
- Kakas Rátót, Hungarian nobleman and soldier
