= Vladimír Kos =

Czech footballer

Personal information
- Full name: Vladimír Kos
- Date of birth: 31 March 1936
- Place of birth: Czechoslovakia
- Date of death: 17 September 2017 (aged 81)
- Position: Midfielder

Senior career*
Years	Team	Apps	(Gls)
1957–1958	Dukla Pardubice		
1958–1963	ČKD Praha		
1964–1968	Sparta Prague		

International career
1959–1965	Czechoslovakia	3	(1)
Medal record
Men's football
Representing Czechoslovakia
FIFA World Cup
Runner-up	1962 Chile
- * Club domestic league appearances and goals

Vladimír Kos (31 March 1936 – 17 September 2017) was a Czech football player who played as a midfielder.

During his club career he played for Dukla Pardubice before joining ČKD Praha in 1958. In 1964 he joined Sparta Prague, where he won two league titles (1964–65 and 1966–67). He made a total of 192 appearances in the Czechoslovak First League, scoring 33 goals.

At international level Kos was involved with Czechoslovakia junior teams, playing 8 matches between 1955 and 1958. He was part of the second-placed team at the 1962 FIFA World Cup, but did not play in the tournament.

In his later years, Kos suffered with diabetes, muscle problems and heart attacks. He died at the age of 81 on 17 September 2017.
