= 1958–59 Czechoslovak First League =

Czechoslovak First League
- Season: 1958–59
- Champions: CH Bratislava
- Relegated: Dynamo Žilina; Spartak Ústí nad Labem
- European Cup: CH Bratislava
- Top goalscorer: Miroslav Wiecek (20 goals)

Statistics of Czechoslovak First League in the 1958–59 season.

== Overview ==
It was contested by 14 teams, and CH Bratislava won the championship. Miroslav Wiecek was the league's top scorer with 20 goals.

== Stadia and locations ==
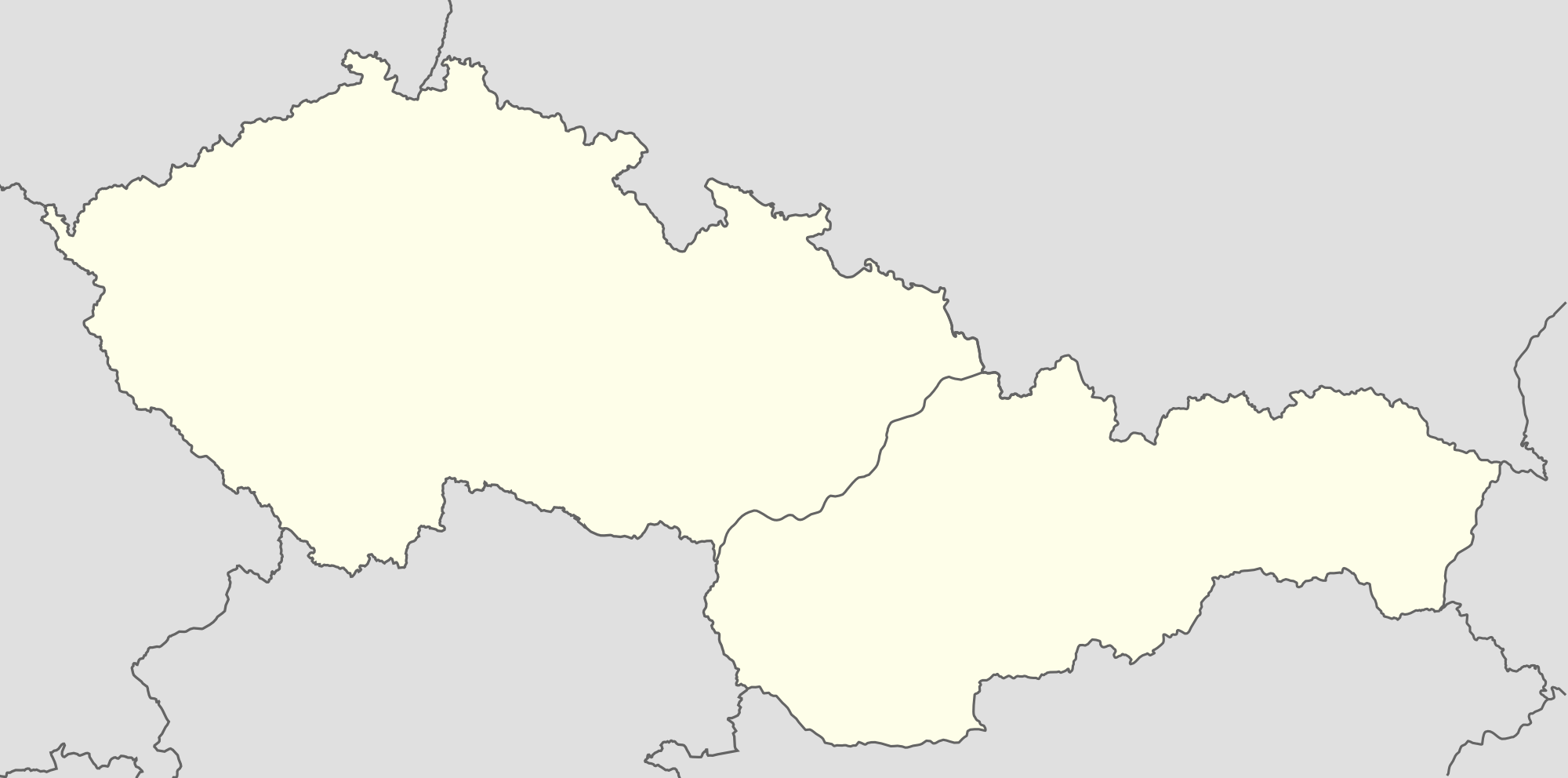
Location of clubs in the 1958–59 Czechoslovak First League

== League standings ==
Pos	Team	Pld	W	D	L	GF	GA	GR	Pts	Qualification or relegation
1	ČH Bratislava (C)	26	16	8	2	56	27	2.074	40	Qualification for European Cup preliminary round
2	Dukla Prague	26	12	7	7	40	30	1.333	31	
3	Dynamo Prague	26	12	7	7	39	34	1.147	31	
4	Tatran Prešov	26	12	5	9	35	37	0.946	29	
5	Rudá Hvězda Brno	26	13	1	12	44	43	1.023	27	
6	FC Baník Ostrava	26	10	6	10	44	40	1.100	26	
7	FC Spartak Trnava	26	9	7	10	31	28	1.107	25	
8	Slovan Bratislava	26	8	8	10	38	36	1.056	24	
9	Spartak Prague Stalingrad	26	7	9	10	37	42	0.881	23	
10	Spartak Prague Sokolovo	26	8	7	11	37	47	0.787	23	
11	Jednota Košice	26	10	3	13	32	43	0.744	23	
12	Dukla Pardubice	26	8	5	13	34	46	0.739	21	
13	Dynamo Žilina (R)	26	7	7	12	36	35	1.029	21	Relegation to Czechoslovak Second League
14	Spartak Ústí nad Labem (R)	26	7	6	13	29	44	0.659	20	Relegation to Czechoslovak Second League

Source: rsssf.com
(C) Champions; (R) Relegated

== Results ==
Home \ Away	OST	BRA	PAR	DUK	DYN	ŽIL	KOŠ	BRN	SLO	STA	SPA	TRN	ÚST	PRE
Baník Ostrava		1–1	2–1	0–2	4–0	1–0	2–1	2–0	0–1	3–2	1–0	5–0	2–3	0–0
ČH Bratislava	3–2		3–1	4–0	1–0	3–0	4–1	2–1	3–1	2–2	0–0	2–2	1–0	3–0
Dukla Pardubice	1–2	0–2		1–0	0–0	1–1	3–2	2–1	1–1	6–1	1–3	1–0	2–0	2–3
Dukla Prague	2–1	1–4	1–1		4–0	1–0	2–1	2–0	1–0	1–0	3–2	1–1	2–2	5–0
Dynamo Prague	2–2	0–0	6–2	1–4		1–0	3–1	6–1	2–1	1–1	2–1	2–1	2–0	0–0
Dynamo Žilina	2–2	1–1	0–1	2–3	4–1		2–0	2–3	2–0	0–0	4–1	0–0	2–0	1–1
Jednota Košice	4–1	1–1	2–1	1–1	1–0	2–0		3–0	1–0	2–1	2–0	0–0	3–0	2–0
Rudá Hvězda Brno	2–1	1–4	1–0	2–0	2–3	1–5	1–0		3–0	3–2	4–0	0–1	5–2	4–0
Slovan Bratislava	2–1	0–2	3–1	1–1	0–0	4–3	5–0	1–1		1–1	2–3	4–1	1–1	4–1
Spartak Prague Stalingrad	2–2	0–1	2–3	0–0	0–2	2–1	6–0	0–3	2–2		4–3	1–0	2–1	0–0
Spartak Sokolovo Prague	4–1	3–3	1–1	2–1	1–1	2–1	3–2	1–2	1–0	0–2		1–0	1–1	1–1
Spartak Trnava	1–1	3–1	4–0	2–1	2–0	0–1	4–0	3–1	0–1	1–1	1–1		2–0	1–0
Spartak Ústí nad Labem	1–4	2–3	2–1	1–1	1–2	1–1	1–0	0–2	2–2	1–2	3–0	1–0		2–1
Tatran Prešov	3–1	4–2	3–0	1–0	0–2	3–1	2–0	1–0	2–1	3–1	4–2	2–1	0–1	

Source: statistiky1ligy.fotbal.cz
Legend: Blue = home team win; Yellow = draw; Red = away team win.
