= ČAFC Židenice 2011 =

Židenice 2011
- Full name: ČAFC Židenice 2011
- Founded: 1921, 2011
- League: District Competition (Brno-City), 9th level
- 2022–23: 1st
- Website: https://cafczidenice2011.cz/

ČAFC Židenice 2011 is a Czech football club located in the cadastral community of Židenice in the city of Brno. The club currently plays at district level, the ninth tier of football in the Czech Republic.

The club played in the Czechoslovak First League, the top flight of Czechoslovak football, in the 1952 season under the name of MEZ Židenice. The club took part in the 2009–10 Czech Cup and reached the second round.

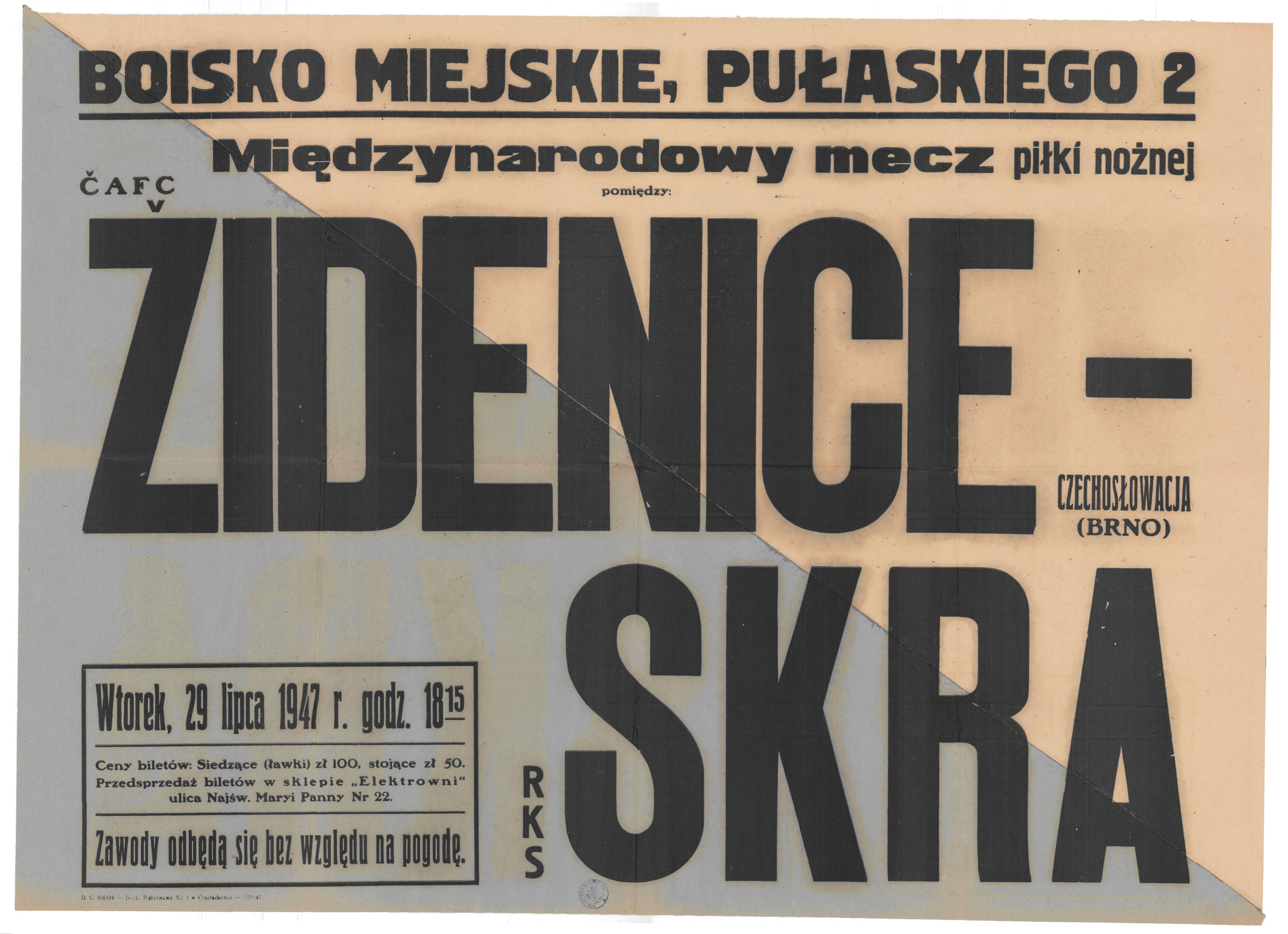
Poster of the friendly match Skra Częstochowa - ČAFC Židenice

== Historical names ==
Former club logo

- 1921: SK Juliánov
- before 1948: DSK Juliánov, DSK Brno XV, ČAFC Židenice
- 1948: Sokol MEZ Židenice
- 1953: Spartak MEZ Židenice
- 1954: Spartak Židenice
- 1960: TJ ZKL Brno
- 1976: Zetor Brno
- 1994: ČAFC Židenice
- 2011: defunct
- 2011: ČAFC Židenice 2011
