= Boris Kitka =

Slovak footballer and coach

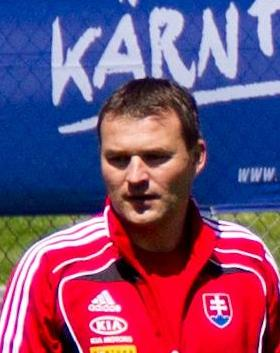

Personal information
- Full name: Boris Kitka
- Date of birth: 16 August 1970 (age 56)
- Place of birth: Czechoslovakia
- Height: 1.82 m (6 ft 0 in)
- Position: Defender

Senior career*
Years	Team	Apps	(Gls)
1990–1992	Slovan Bratislava	17	(0)
1992–1993	Spartak Trnava	27	(0)
1993–1994	Inter Bratislava	20	(0)
1994–1997	Baník Prievidza	35	(3)
1997–2000	Ried	58	(1)

Managerial career
- 2007–2008: Slovan Bratislava
- 2009–2010: Slovakia U21
- 2012–2015: Kairat (Assistant)
- 2021–2026: Slovan Bratislava (Assistant)
- * Club domestic league appearances and goals

Boris Kitka (born 16 August 1970) is a Slovak football player and football manager. He played for Slovan Bratislava as well as rivals of Spartak Trnava. He managed Slovan Bratislava and Slovakia U21. As an assistant, he cooperates with Vladimír Weiss for over a decade.

Kitka also occasionally appears as an expert analyst for Slovak public broadcaster RTVS during national team fixtures and major tournaments, such as UEFA Euro 2020.
