= 1959–60 Czechoslovak First League =

Czechoslovak First League
- Season: 1959–60
- Champions: Spartak Hradec Králové
- Relegated: Jednota Košice; Dukla Pardubice
- European Cup: Spartak Hradec Králové
- Cup Winners' Cup: Rudá Hvězda Brno
- Top goalscorer: Michal Pucher (18 goals)

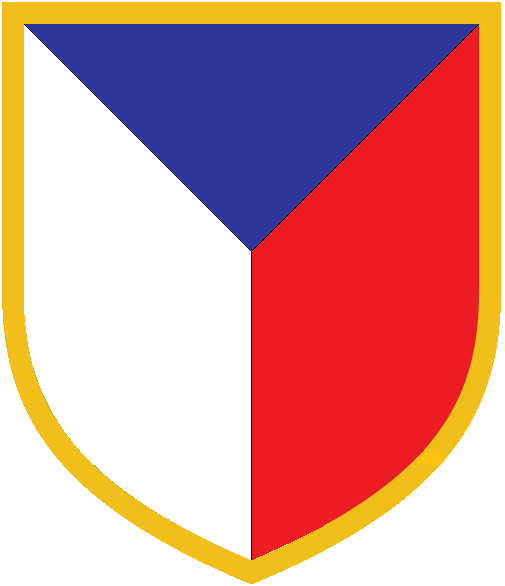
A shield emblem with the colors of the Czech flag for the 1959-60 Czechoslovak First League season

Statistics of Czechoslovak First League in the 1959–60 season.

== Overview ==
It was contested by 14 teams, and Spartak Hradec Králové won the championship. Michal Pucher was the league's top scorer with 18 goals.

== Stadia and locations ==
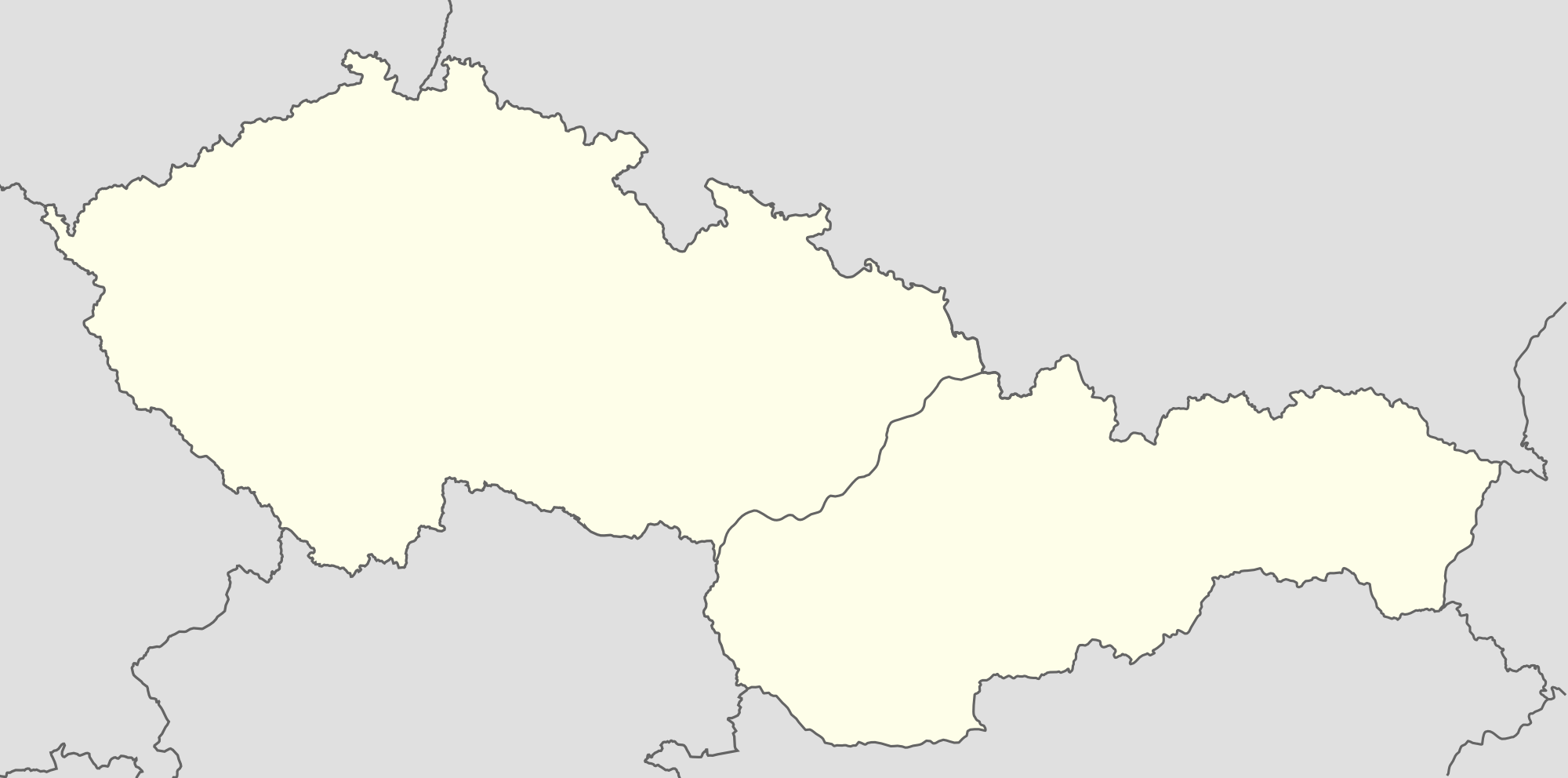
Location of clubs in the 1959–60 Czechoslovak First League

== League standings ==
Pos	Team	Pld	W	D	L	GF	GA	GR	Pts	Qualification or relegation
1	Spartak Hradec Králové (C)	26	13	8	5	43	27	1.593	34	Qualification for European Cup preliminary round
2	Slovan Bratislava	26	12	8	6	53	31	1.710	32	
3	Dukla Prague	26	11	10	5	44	25	1.760	32	
4	Spartak Trnava	26	13	5	8	43	38	1.132	31	
5	ČH Bratislava	26	12	6	8	40	26	1.538	30	
6	Baník Ostrava	26	12	4	10	29	34	0.853	28	
7	Spartak Prague Stalingrad	26	8	10	8	36	29	1.241	26	
8	Slovan Nitra	26	8	8	10	38	39	0.974	24	
9	Tatran Prešov	26	9	6	11	39	43	0.907	24	
10	Rudá Hvězda Brno	26	10	3	13	34	37	0.919	23	Qualification for Cup Winners' Cup preliminary round
11	Dynamo Prague	26	9	5	12	36	44	0.818	23	
12	Spartak Prague Sokolovo	26	9	5	12	31	40	0.775	23	
13	Jednota Košice (R)	26	8	6	12	24	44	0.545	22	Relegation to Czechoslovak Second League
14	Dukla Pardubice (R)	26	4	4	18	23	56	0.411	12	Relegation to Czechoslovak Second League

Source: rsssf.com
(C) Champions; (R) Relegated

== Results ==
Home \ Away	OST	BRA	PAR	DUK	DYN	KOŠ	BRN	NIT	SLO	HRK	STA	SPA	TRN	PRE
Baník Ostrava		2–1	3–0	0–0	1–0	3–0	1–0	1–1	3–2	0–1	1–1	1–0	2–1	1–0
ČH Bratislava	3–0		3–0	0–0	0–1	2–1	2–1	3–1	1–2	0–1	0–0	0–0	2–1	4–2
Dukla Pardubice	1–2	2–5		0–3	3–0	0–0	0–3	3–0	0–1	3–1	0–3	0–1	1–1	2–2
Dukla Prague	1–0	2–1	7–0		2–2	4–1	0–2	2–1	1–1	0–0	0–0	1–1	3–0	2–3
Dynamo Prague	3–1	0–0	2–1	0–1		3–1	1–0	1–1	2–2	4–3	1–4	4–1	1–2	4–0
Jednota Košice	1–0	2–3	1–1	0–3	1–0		2–1	3–2	1–0	1–0	1–1	3–0	2–1	1–1
Rudá Hvězda Brno	0–1	2–1	2–0	2–2	1–2	2–1		1–0	4–3	1–3	2–0	1–1	3–0	2–1
Slovan Nitra	3–2	1–3	0–2	1–1	7–1	0–0	2–1		2–2	3–0	2–1	1–1	2–3	2–1
Slovan Bratislava	5–0	2–1	3–1	2–1	3–1	7–1	2–0	1–1		1–1	4–1	0–0	0–1	3–0
Spartak Hradec Králové	2–0	1–1	1–0	3–1	1–0	0–0	3–0	4–0	2–1		0–0	2–0	2–2	4–1
Spartak Prague Stalingrad	4–1	0–0	2–0	1–1	1–1	3–0	4–1	0–1	2–2	4–1		1–2	0–1	0–0
Spartak Sokolovo Prague	3–0	1–3	2–1	1–3	3–0	3–0	2–1	0–3	1–3	0–3	0–2		5–2	2–0
Spartak Trnava	1–3	1–0	4–2	2–1	1–0	3–0	1–1	1–0	0–0	2–2	3–1	2–1		5–1
Tatran Prešov	0–0	0–1	4–0	1–2	3–2	1–0	2–0	1–1	3–1	2–2	4–0	3–0	3–2	

Source: statistiky1ligy.fotbal.cz
Legend: Blue = home team win; Yellow = draw; Red = away team win.
