= 1954 Czechoslovak First League =

Czechoslovak First League
- Season: 1954
- Dates: 13 March – 21 November
- Champions: Spartak Praha Sokolovo
- Relegated: Křídla vlasti Olomouc; Spartak Praha Stalingrad
- Top goalscorer: Jiří Pešek (15 goals)

Statistics of Czechoslovak First League in the 1954 season.

== Overview ==
It was contested by 12 teams, and Spartak Praha Sokolovo won the championship. Jiří Pešek was the league's top scorer with 15 goals.

== Stadia and locations ==
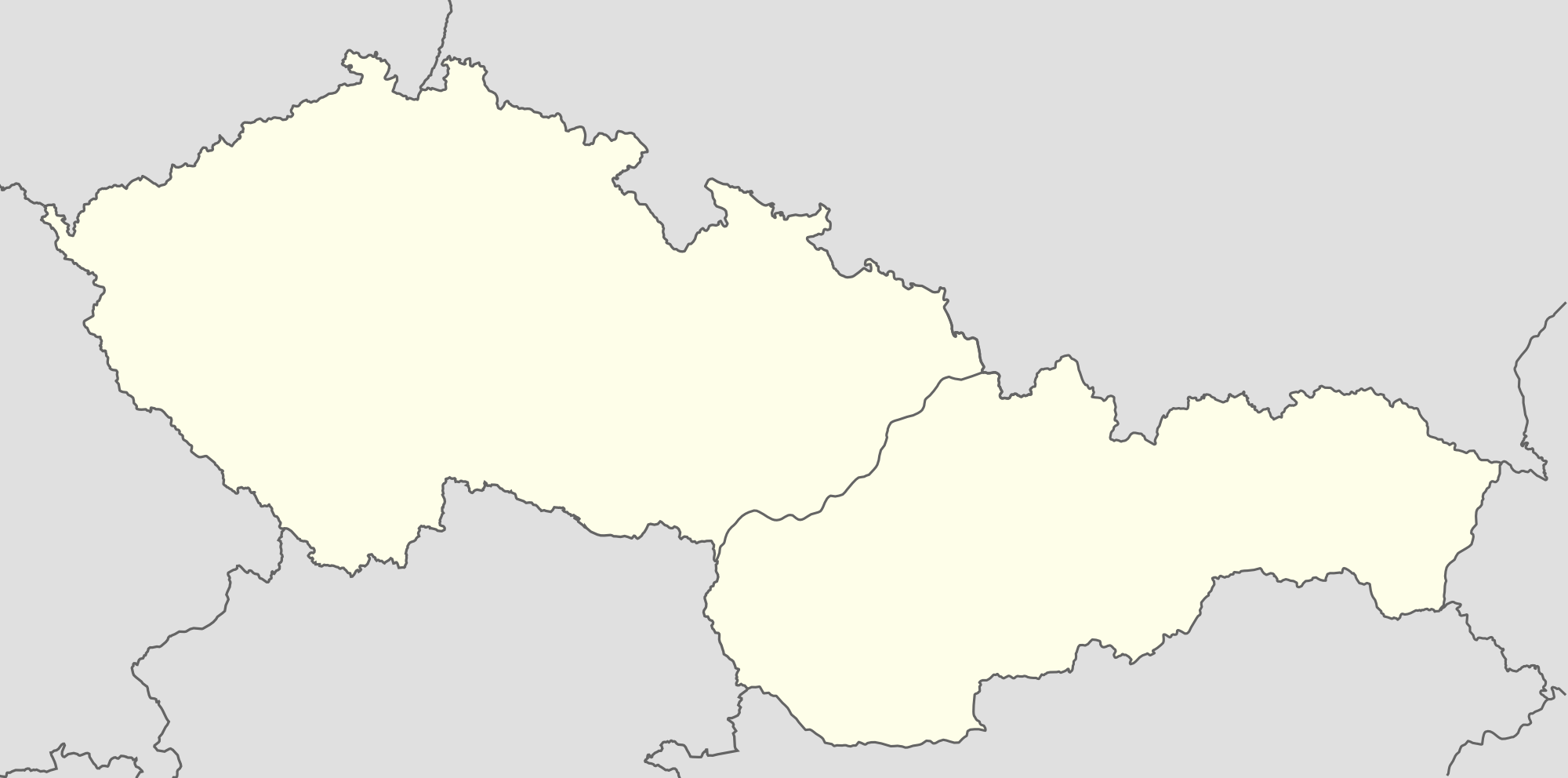
Location of clubs in the 1954 Czechoslovak First League

== League standings ==
Pos	Team	Pld	W	D	L	GF	GA	GR	Pts
1	Spartak Prague Sokolovo (C)	22	13	4	5	45	21	2.143	30
2	Baník Ostrava	22	11	6	5	45	26	1.731	28
3	ČH Bratislava	22	12	3	7	34	23	1.478	27
4	ÚDA Prague	22	9	7	6	33	26	1.269	25
5	Slovan Bratislava	22	10	5	7	35	28	1.250	25
6	Baník Kladno	22	7	8	7	37	32	1.156	22
7	Dynamo Prague	22	9	3	10	36	57	0.632	21
8	Iskra Žilina	22	7	6	9	25	36	0.694	20
9	Tatran Prešov	22	8	2	12	26	43	0.605	18
10	Tankista Prague	22	5	7	10	32	33	0.970	17
11	Křídla vlasti Olomouc (R)	22	6	5	11	23	26	0.885	17
12	Spartak Prague Stalingrad (R)	22	5	4	13	34	54	0.630	14

Source: rsssf.com
(C) Champions; (R) Relegated

== Results ==
Home \ Away	KLA	OST	BRA	DYN	ŽIL	OLO	SLO	STA	SPA	TAN	PRE	ÚDA
Baník Kladno		2–3	0–0	5–0	3–1	0–1	3–4	2–0	1–1	3–2	4–0	3–0
Baník Ostrava	1–1		2–0	7–1	1–0	2–0	0–0	3–2	1–1	3–2	9–0	2–0
ČH Bratislava	2–1	1–2		2–3	4–0	1–0	2–0	0–2	4–1	0–0	1–0	1–1
Dynamo Prague	2–2	2–1	4–1		4–2	2–1	0–3	2–1	0–5	5–2	0–2	3–0
Iskra Žilina	0–0	3–0	1–0	1–1		1–0	2–1	4–2	0–3	1–1	2–0	0–5
Křídla vlasti Olomouc	2–2	1–1	0–2	0–1	3–1		5–1	4–0	1–0	0–0	2–0	0–2
Slovan Bratislava	0–0	2–2	3–1	5–2	2–0	0–0		3–2	1–2	1–0	2–0	1–1
Spartak Prague Stalingrad	1–2	2–2	2–3	2–2	1–3	2–1	0–4		2–1	2–1	2–3	2–2
Spartak Sokolovo Prague	4–0	1–0	0–2	5–1	1–1	2–0	1–0	3–2		1–1	3–0	1–0
Tankista Prague	2–2	1–2	0–1	3–0	2–0	1–1	3–0	6–1	1–6		2–0	1–1
Tatran Prešov	3–1	3–1	1–3	3–0	2–2	2–0	0–2	2–3	2–0	1–0		1–1
ÚDA Prague	3–0	1–0	0–3	4–1	0–0	3–1	2–0	1–1	1–3	2–1	3–1	

Source: statistiky1ligy.fotbal.cz
Legend: Blue = home team win; Yellow = draw; Red = away team win.
