= 1957–58 Czechoslovak First League =

Czechoslovak First League
- Season: 1957–58
- Dates: 16 March 1957 – 18 May 1958
- Champions: Dukla Prague
- Relegated: Spartak Hradec Králové; SONP Kladno
- European Cup: Dukla Prague
- Top goalscorer: Miroslav Wiecek (25 goals)

Statistics of Czechoslovak First League in the 1957–58 season.

== Overview ==
It was contested by 12 teams, and Dukla Prague won the championship. Miroslav Wiecek was the league's top scorer with 25 goals.

== Stadia and locations ==
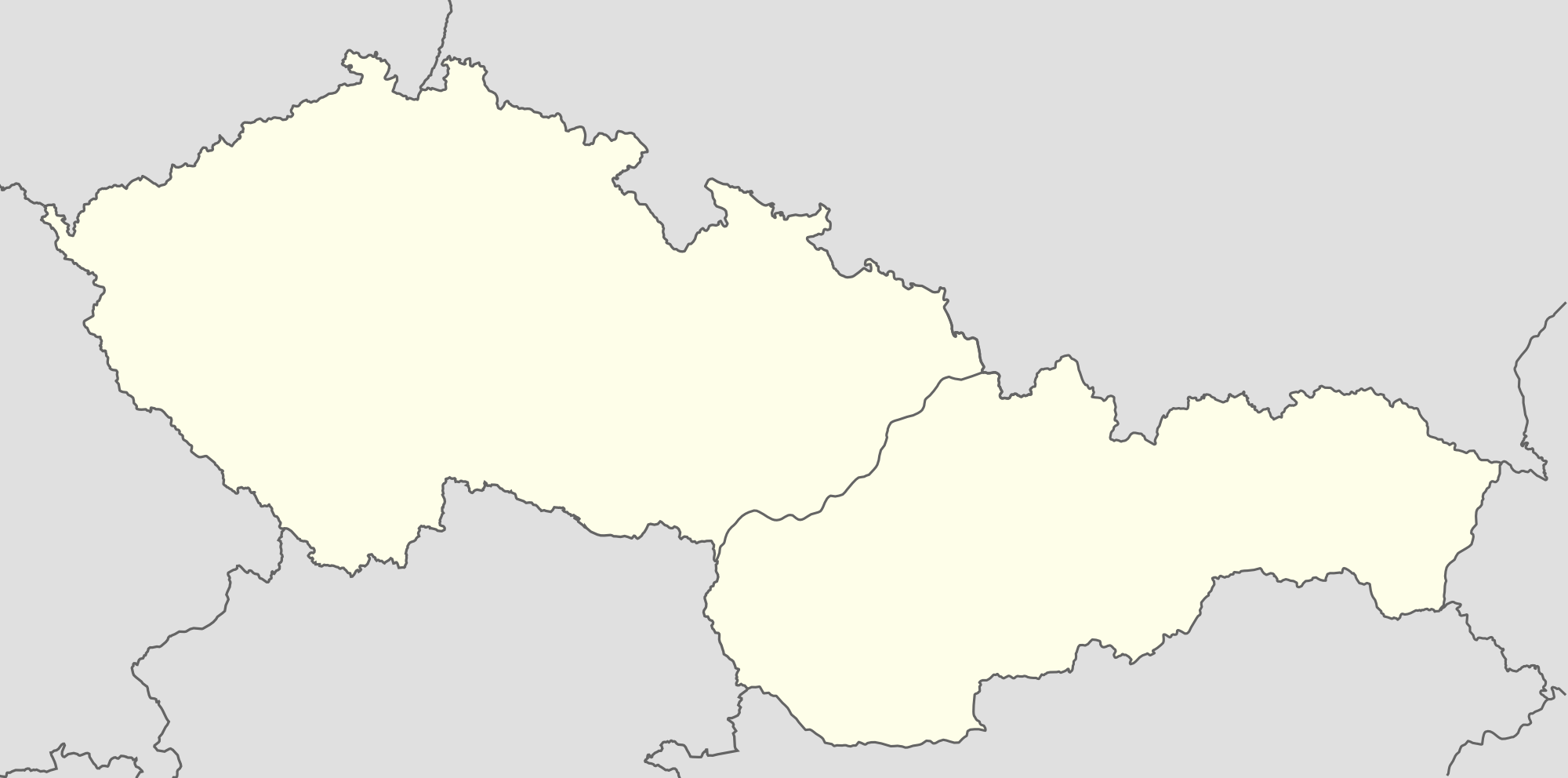
Location of clubs in the 1957–58 Czechoslovak First League

== League standings ==
Pos	Team	Pld	W	D	L	GF	GA	GR	Pts	Qualification or relegation
1	Dukla Prague (C)	33	16	8	9	60	38	1.579	40	Qualification for European Cup preliminary round
2	Spartak Prague Sokolovo	33	17	6	10	63	43	1.465	40	
3	CH Bratislava	33	14	10	9	56	41	1.366	38	
4	Slovan Bratislava	33	15	7	11	58	45	1.289	37	
5	Dynamo Prague	33	14	8	11	56	50	1.120	36	
6	Tatran Prešov	33	14	6	13	44	49	0.898	34	
7	Rudá Hvězda Brno	33	13	7	13	46	46	1.000	33	
8	Dukla Pardubice	33	13	7	13	58	73	0.795	33	
9	Spartak Trnava	33	10	11	12	45	49	0.918	31	
10	Baník Ostrava	33	10	8	15	58	63	0.921	28	
11	Spartak Hradec Králové (R)	33	9	7	17	52	76	0.684	25	Relegation to Czechoslovak Second League
12	SONP Kladno (R)	33	9	3	21	52	75	0.693	21	Relegation to Czechoslovak Second League

Source: rsssf.com
(C) Champions; (R) Relegated

== Results ==
=== First and second round ===
Home \ Away	OST	BRA	PAR	DUK	DYN	BRN	SLO	KLA	HRK	SPA	TRN	PRE
Baník Ostrava		0–0	6–1	2–2	3–1	1–1	4–0	0–1	1–1	0–2	1–0	0–2
ČH Bratislava	2–1		4–1	1–0	3–0	2–1	0–3	1–0	2–0	2–1	0–0	7–1
Dukla Pardubice	4–2	1–6		0–2	1–0	2–0	0–0	6–0	2–1	0–2	1–1	4–1
Dukla Prague	0–3	0–0	0–3		1–1	1–1	2–0	0–2	6–1	2–0	1–0	2–0
Dynamo Prague	3–0	1–1	3–3	2–2		2–2	1–0	5–0	4–2	4–1	2–0	2–0
Rudá Hvězda Brno	0–0	3–2	1–2	4–2	0–2		1–2	2–1	3–2	4–2	3–1	0–0
Slovan Bratislava	6–1	1–1	2–2	2–1	3–1	1–0		5–3	6–0	0–2	1–1	1–0
SONP Kladno	3–4	4–1	2–3	2–3	3–0	0–1	3–2		1–2	2–1	3–1	1–1
Spartak Hradec Králové	3–3	2–1	5–2	2–5	0–0	2–3	1–1	2–1		1–4	3–1	3–2
Spartak Sokolovo Prague	5–0	1–1	9–2	1–2	3–1	1–0	3–0	2–1	2–2		0–0	3–2
Spartak Trnava	3–1	3–1	3–0	1–0	1–1	1–2	1–0	4–0	1–1	0–0		4–2
Tatran Prešov	0–0	1–1	1–0	1–0	2–0	3–0	4–1	3–1	2–0	1–2	3–0	

Source: csfotbal.cz (archived)
Legend: Blue = home team win; Yellow = draw; Red = away team win.

=== Third round ===
Home \ Away	OST	BRA	PAR	DUK	DYN	BRN	SLO	KLA	HRK	SPA	TRN	PRE
Baník Ostrava		1–2		0–2					3–0	0–2	6–1	
ČH Bratislava						2–0	2–0			3–0	1–1	0–1
Dukla Pardubice	2–4	2–1		2–2		2–1	2–1				1–1	
Dukla Prague		2–2				2–0	1–2				2–0	4–0
Dynamo Prague	4–2	3–0	2–1	1–2		0–0					5–1	
Rudá Hvězda Brno	2–2						0–1	2–1	1–0	4–2		4–0
Slovan Bratislava	4–2				5–0			3–0	2–1	0–0		1–1
SONP Kladno	4–2	3–3	4–0	0–4	2–3						2–2	
Spartak Hradec Králové		3–1	2–4	2–2	1–2			3–1				
Spartak Sokolovo Prague			3–1	0–3	1–0			3–1	3–1			
Spartak Trnava						2–0	4–2		3–1	1–1		1–2
Tatran Prešov	0–3		1–1		3–0			1–0	1–2	2–1		

Source: csfotbal.cz (archived)
Legend: Blue = home team win; Yellow = draw; Red = away team win.

== Attendances ==
#	Football club	Average attendance
1	Slovan Bratislava	23,059
2	Spartak Praha Sokolovo	19,875
3	Dynamo Praha	18,471
4	Rudá Hvězda Brno	16,824
5	CH Bratislava	16,000
6	Baník Ostrava	13,750
7	Dukla Praha	10,750
8	Spartak Hradec Králové	10,500
9	Dukla Pardubice	9,353
10	Spartak Trnava	9,063
11	Tatran Prešov	8,235
12	SONP Kladno	6,294
