= 1952 Czechoslovak First League =

Czechoslovak First League
- Season: 1952
- Dates: 9 March – 30 November
- Champions: Sparta ČKD Sokolovo
- Relegated: ZVIL Plzeň; Dynamo ČSD Košice; Armaturka Ústí nad Labem; MEZ Židenice
- Top goalscorer: Miroslav Wiecek (20 goals)

Statistics of Czechoslovak First League in the 1952 season.

== Overview ==
It was contested by 14 teams, and Sparta ČKD Sokolovo won the championship. Miroslav Wiecek was the league's top scorer with 20 goals.

== Stadia and locations ==
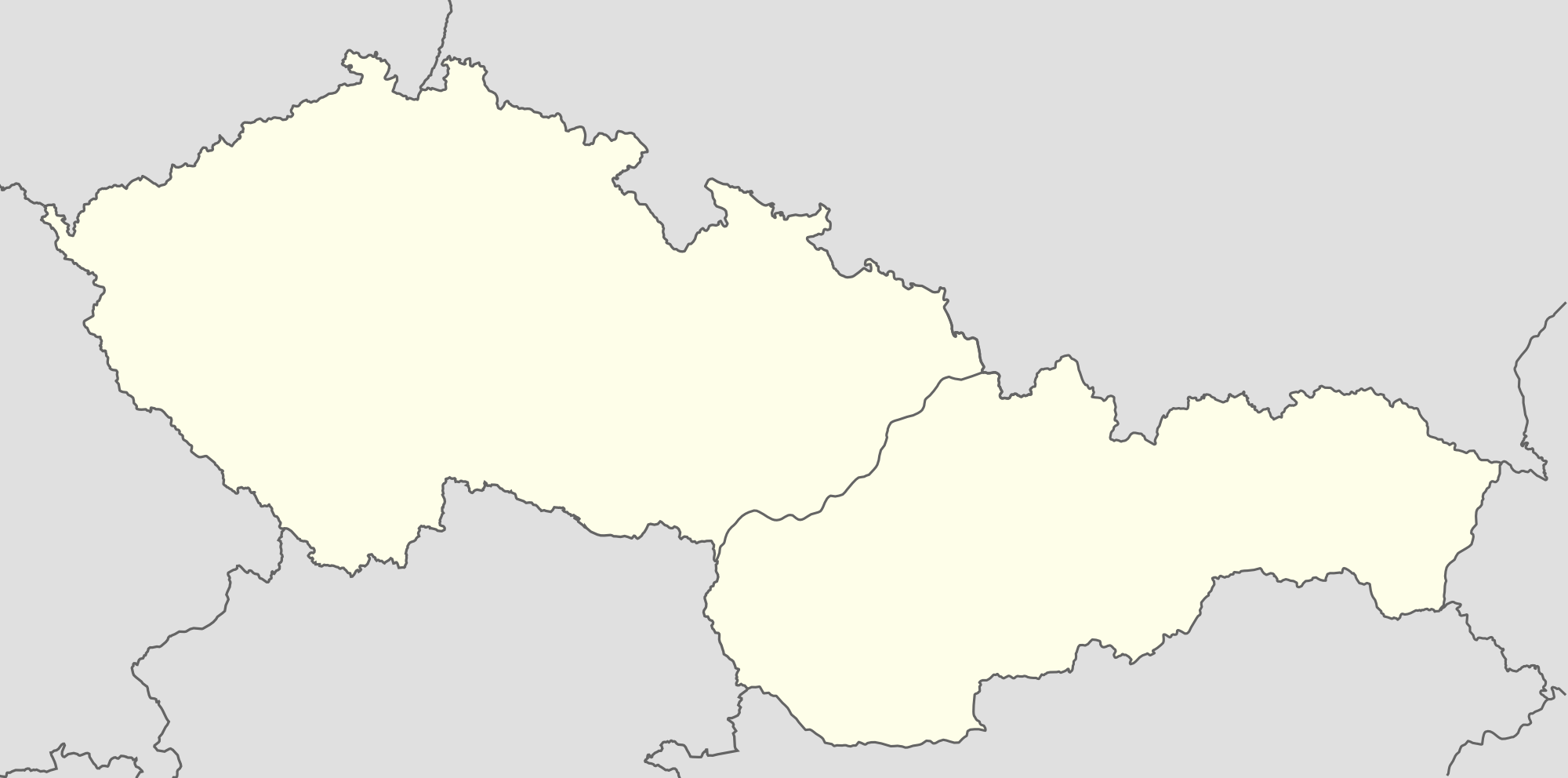
Location of clubs in the 1952 Czechoslovak First League

== League standings ==
Pos	Team	Pld	W	D	L	GF	GA	GR	Pts
1	Sparta ČKD Sokolovo (C)	26	18	5	3	63	22	2.864	41
2	NV Bratislava	26	18	4	4	59	25	2.360	40
3	Ingstav Teplice	26	13	7	6	48	30	1.600	33
4	SONP Kladno	26	11	7	8	67	47	1.426	29
5	Kovosmalt Trnava	26	10	9	7	48	49	0.980	29
6	ČSSZ Prešov	26	12	4	10	57	48	1.188	28
7	Slovena Žilina	26	12	4	10	48	57	0.842	28
8	ATK Prague	26	9	9	8	40	32	1.250	27
9	Vítkovické železárny	26	12	2	12	55	52	1.058	26
10	OKD Ostrava	26	10	4	12	43	47	0.915	24
11	ZVIL Plzeň (R)	26	8	6	12	42	62	0.677	22
12	Dynamo ČSD Košice (R)	26	6	4	16	43	63	0.683	16
13	Armaturka Ústí nad Labem (R)	26	4	5	17	38	71	0.535	13
14	MEZ Židenice (R)	26	2	4	20	25	71	0.352	8

Source: rsssf.com
(C) Champions; (R) Relegated

== Results ==
Home \ Away	ÚST	ATK	PRE	KOŠ	TEP	TRN	ŽID	NVB	OST	ŽIL	KLA	SPA	VÍT	PLZ
Armaturka Ústí nad Labem		0–4	2–2	5–2	2–4	1–1	1–4	2–3	1–3	2–2	1–1	4–2	1–2	2–3
ATK Prag	0–1		6–2	0–0	1–1	3–2	1–0	0–2	2–2	4–0	1–1	1–1	1–2	3–0
ČSSZ Prešov	2–0	1–3		5–1	3–0	6–0	3–1	1–2	2–1	1–0	4–2	2–2	4–0	1–2
Dynamo ČSD Košice	6–1	2–0	2–4		0–1	1–2	2–2	1–5	1–0	8–1	2–4	0–1	0–1	4–2
Ingstav Teplice	2–0	4–0	0–0	1–0		2–2	6–0	3–1	0–1	3–0	4–1	2–1	3–2	1–2
Kovosmalt Trnava	1–0	0–0	2–1	5–3	3–3		3–1	1–0	5–0	2–3	1–1	0–0	4–3	0–1
MEZ Židenice	1–3	0–0	1–3	0–0	0–1	2–4		2–3	3–1	1–2	0–2	0–0	1–3	1–4
NV Bratislava	3–1	1–0	5–0	6–1	1–1	0–0	4–0		1–0	2–2	3–1	1–0	3–1	4–1
OKD Ostrava	4–2	0–4	5–1	1–3	1–1	4–0	5–1	1–0		3–0	0–2	1–3	2–1	0–0
Slovena Žilina	3–1	2–0	1–0	3–1	2–1	0–3	5–1	2–0	2–2		7–1	2–3	4–2	4–1
SONP Kladno	7–1	2–2	4–2	0–0	2–2	2–2	6–0	1–3	6–2	6–0		1–3	5–1	6–0
Sparta ČKD Sokolovo	3–2	3–0	3–2	3–1	2–0	5–1	3–1	0–0	2–0	3–0	4–0		6–1	4–0
Vítkovické železárny	5–1	1–2	1–1	3–0	1–2	4–1	4–2	1–2	3–0	5–0	2–1	0–3		3–0
ZVIL Plzeň	1–1	2–2	2–4	7–2	2–0	3–3	2–0	2–4	1–4	1–1	0–2	0–3	3–3	

Source: statistiky1ligy.fotbal.cz
Legend: Blue = home team win; Yellow = draw; Red = away team win.
