= 1949 Czechoslovak First League =

Czechoslovak First League
- Season: 1949
- Dates: 19 March – 4 December
- Champions: NV Bratislava
- Relegated: Sokol Trojice Ostrava; Zbrojovka Brno; Manet Považská Bystrica; SONP Kladno
- Top goalscorer: Ladislav Hlaváček (28 goals)

Statistics of Czechoslovak First League in the 1949 season.

== Overview ==
It was contested by 14 teams, and NV Bratislava won the championship. Ladislav Hlaváček was the league's top scorer with 28 goals.

== Stadia and locations ==
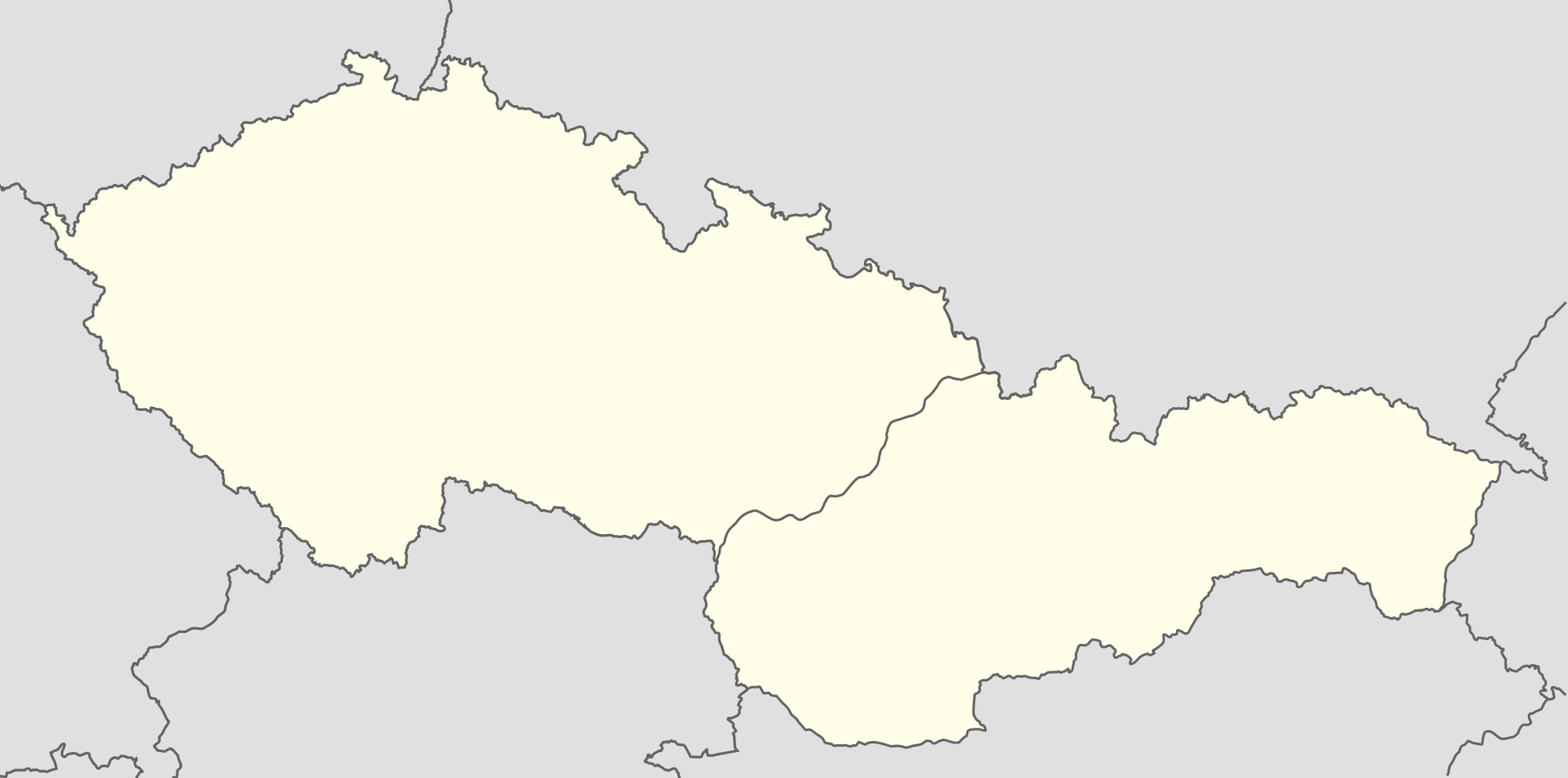
Location of clubs in the 1949 Czechoslovak First League

== League standings ==
Pos	Team	Pld	W	D	L	GF	GA	GR	Pts
1	NV Bratislava (C)	26	18	5	3	93	33	2.818	41
2	Bratrství Sparta	26	16	5	5	89	42	2.119	37
3	Železničáři Prague	26	14	5	7	80	50	1.600	33
4	ATK Prague	26	13	4	9	80	58	1.379	30
5	Dynamo Slavia Prague	26	14	2	10	71	54	1.315	30
6	Technomat Teplice	26	12	5	9	63	48	1.313	29
7	Slovena Žilina	26	11	6	9	48	56	0.857	28
8	Dynamo ČSD Košice	26	8	8	10	45	42	1.071	24
9	Kovosmalt Trnava	26	9	6	11	48	53	0.906	24
10	Škoda Plzeň	26	9	6	11	53	62	0.855	24
11	Sokol Trojice Ostrava (R)	26	9	4	13	38	55	0.691	22
12	Zbrojovka Brno (R)	26	6	5	15	47	94	0.500	17
13	Manet Považská Bystrica (R)	26	7	3	16	38	79	0.481	17
14	SONP Kladno (R)	26	3	2	21	39	106	0.368	8

Source: rsssf.com
(C) Champions; (R) Relegated

== Results ==
Home \ Away	ATK	BRA	KOŠ	DYN	TRN	POV	NVB	PLZ	ŽIL	OST	KLA	TEP	BRN	ŽEL
ATK Prague		0–2	1–1	1–5	5–1	1–2	3–2	4–2	7–0	1–3	6–2	0–2	0–1	0–3
Bratrství Sparta	2–3		2–2	5–0	3–3	5–1	1–4	3–1	3–4	3–1	7–1	1–1	7–0	3–3
Dynamo ČSD Košice	2–3	1–2		3–1	2–0	4–0	0–1	1–1	0–0	6–0	2–0	0–1	2–0	3–3
Dynamo Slavia Prague	5–4	3–2	1–3		1–2	8–2	4–2	3–2	4–0	2–1	3–1	1–2	7–0	1–3
Kovosmalt Trnava	2–4	0–2	1–1	1–0		4–1	2–5	0–2	1–1	1–0	6–1	2–1	5–1	0–1
Manet Považská Bystrica	2–9	1–3	0–1	1–3	5–1		1–8	0–0	1–2	1–0	4–1	0–3	4–2	1–1
NV Bratislava	6–1	3–3	0–0	2–2	1–4	4–2		1–0	6–0	3–0	2–0	3–0	9–1	9–1
Škoda Plzeň	1–1	0–4	4–3	2–6	1–1	8–1	0–5		3–0	2–3	7–2	3–2	4–2	1–5
Slovena Žilina	2–2	3–4	4–3	2–4	4–1	1–1	1–2	1–1		2–1	4–0	3–1	6–1	1–0
Sokol Trojice Ostrava	2–7	1–5	3–1	5–2	1–1	1–0	1–1	0–1	2–1		3–1	1–1	0–1	2–1
SONP Kladno	1–6	1–9	4–2	1–2	3–3	4–0	0–2	3–4	1–2	2–2		0–3	6–1	0–10
Technomat Teplice	2–2	2–4	7–0	3–1	3–1	3–1	2–3	5–1	1–3	2–4	4–1		4–4	3–3
Zbrojovka Brno	2–5	1–4	2–1	1–1	4–2	0–2	3–3	2–2	1–1	4–1	6–1	3–4		2–8
Železničáři Prague	3–4	2–0	1–1	3–1	0–3	2–4	1–6	4–0	5–0	3–0	6–2	3–1	5–2	

Source: statistiky1ligy.fotbal.cz
Legend: Blue = home team win; Yellow = draw; Red = away team win.
