= 1956 Czechoslovak First League =

Czechoslovak First League
- Season: 1956
- Dates: 11 March – 25 November
- Champions: Dukla Prague
- Relegated: Dynamo Žilina; Spartak VSS Košice
- European Cup: Dukla Prague
- Top goalscorer: Milan Dvořák; Miroslav Wiecek (15 goals each)

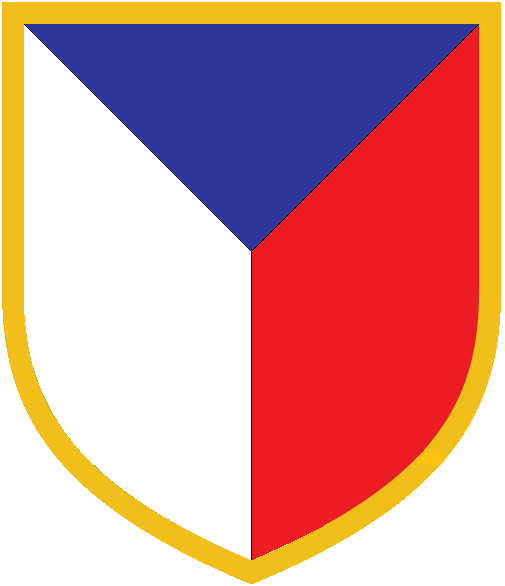

Statistics of Czechoslovak First League in the 1956 season.

== Overview ==
It was contested by 12 teams, and Dukla Prague won the championship. Milan Dvořák and Miroslav Wiecek were the league's top scorers with 15 goals each.

== Stadia and locations ==
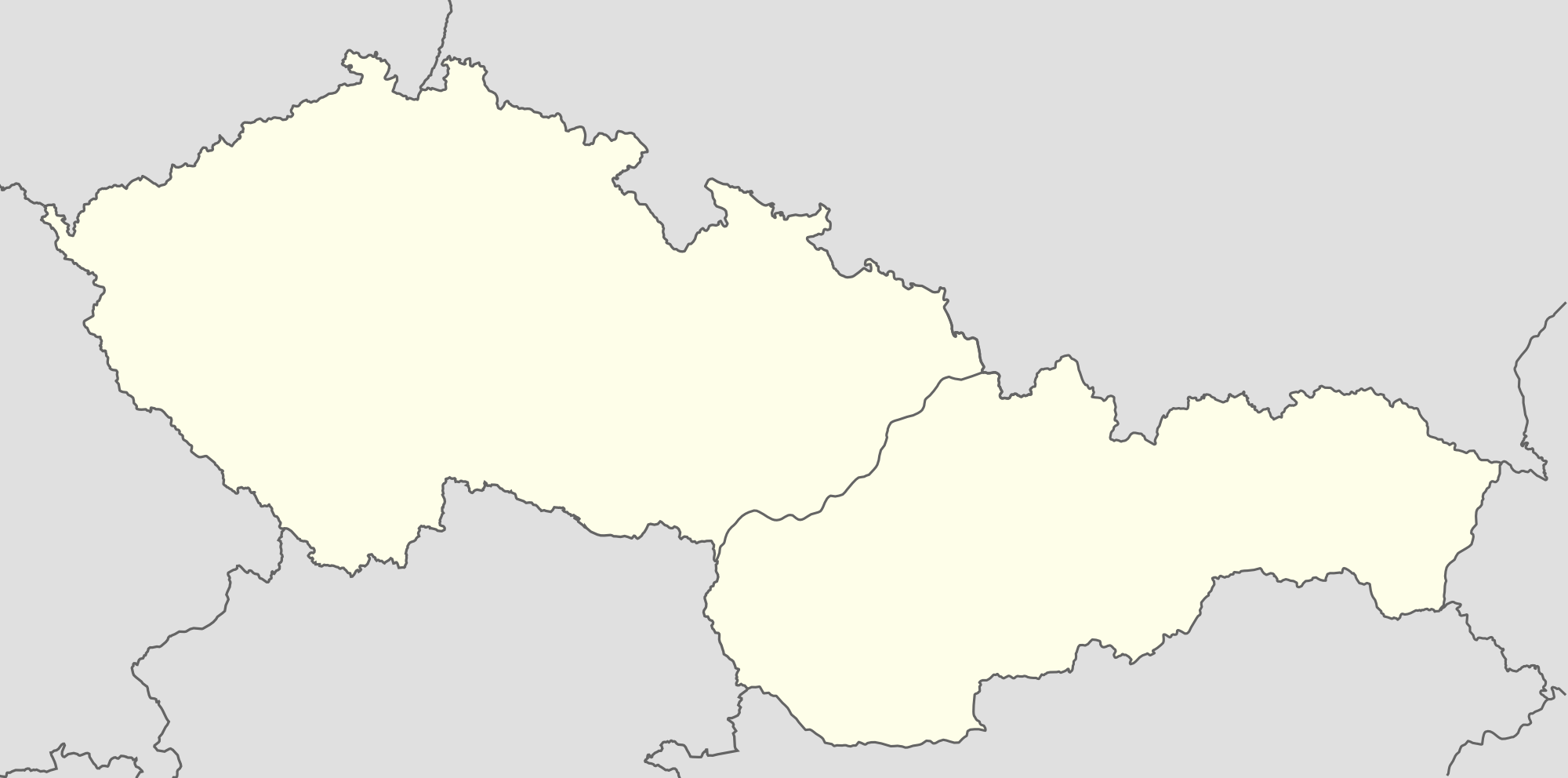
Location of clubs in the 1956 Czechoslovak First League

== League standings ==
Pos	Team	Pld	W	D	L	GF	GA	GR	Pts	Qualification or relegation
1	Dukla Prague (C)	22	12	8	2	57	20	2.850	32	Qualification for European Cup first round
2	Slovan Bratislava	22	10	7	5	37	23	1.609	27	
3	Spartak Praha Sokolovo	22	11	4	7	50	33	1.515	26	
4	Baník Ostrava	22	9	7	6	53	48	1.104	25	
5	CH Bratislava	22	9	7	6	41	38	1.079	25	
6	Baník Kladno	22	9	4	9	33	25	1.320	22	
7	Spartak Hradec Králové	22	9	3	10	30	40	0.750	21	
8	Tatran Prešov	22	7	6	9	32	39	0.821	20	
9	Spartak Trnava	22	7	4	11	24	41	0.585	18	
10	Dynamo Prague	22	6	5	11	35	45	0.778	17	
11	Dynamo Žilina (R)	22	6	5	11	27	46	0.587	17	Relegation to Czechoslovak Second League
12	Spartak VSS Košice (R)	22	6	2	14	27	48	0.563	14	Relegation to Czechoslovak Second League

Source: rsssf.com
(C) Champions; (R) Relegated

== Results ==
Home \ Away	KLA	OST	BRA	DUK	DYN	ŽIL	SLO	HRK	SPA	TRN	KOŠ	PRE
Banik Kladno		4–0	2–1	2–2	2–1	2–0	2–2	1–1	2–0	4–0	2–0	4–0
Baník Ostrava	3–0		3–3	1–3	3–0	6–1	0–0	10–1	3–1	1–1	2–1	3–3
ČH Bratislava	2–1	3–4		1–6	1–0	3–1	1–1	0–2	5–2	2–0	2–0	3–0
Dukla Prague	3–1	9–0	1–1		6–3	3–2	0–0	4–0	0–0	4–0	3–1	3–0
Dynamo Prague	0–0	1–1	2–2	0–5		2–3	1–1	2–1	2–6	5–0	5–1	3–1
Dynamo Žilina	2–0	2–1	0–3	0–0	1–2		1–4	2–1	3–3	1–3	2–1	3–2
Slovan Bratislava	1–0	6–3	0–0	0–1	2–0	3–0		2–0	3–0	1–2	4–2	3–1
Spartak Hradec Králové	2–1	1–2	1–1	0–0	4–2	3–1	3–0		1–0	3–2	1–0	3–0
Spartak Sokolovo Prague	1–0	3–1	5–0	3–1	1–0	2–2	4–0	4–1		4–1	8–2	0–3
Spartak Trnava	1–0	0–1	3–3	1–1	2–1	0–0	0–3	3–0	1–0		1–0	2–3
Spartak VSS Košice	3–2	1–1	2–3	2–2	1–2	2–0	2–1	1–0	0–1	3–1		2–1
Tatran Prešov	0–1	4–4	2–1	2–0	1–1	0–0	0–0	2–1	2–2	1–0	4–0	

Source: statistiky1ligy.fotbal.cz
Legend: Blue = home team win; Yellow = draw; Red = away team win.
