= 1951 Czechoslovak First League =

Czechoslovak First League
- Season: 1951
- Dates: 10 March – 26 November
- Champions: NV Bratislava
- Relegated: Dynamo Slavia Prague; Svit Gottwaldov; Železničáři Praha; ČKD Dukla Karlín
- Top goalscorer: Alois Jaroš (16 goals)

Statistics of Czechoslovak First League in the 1951 season.

== Overview ==
It was contested by 14 teams, and NV Bratislava won the championship. Alois Jaroš was the league's top scorer with 16 goals.

== Stadia and locations ==
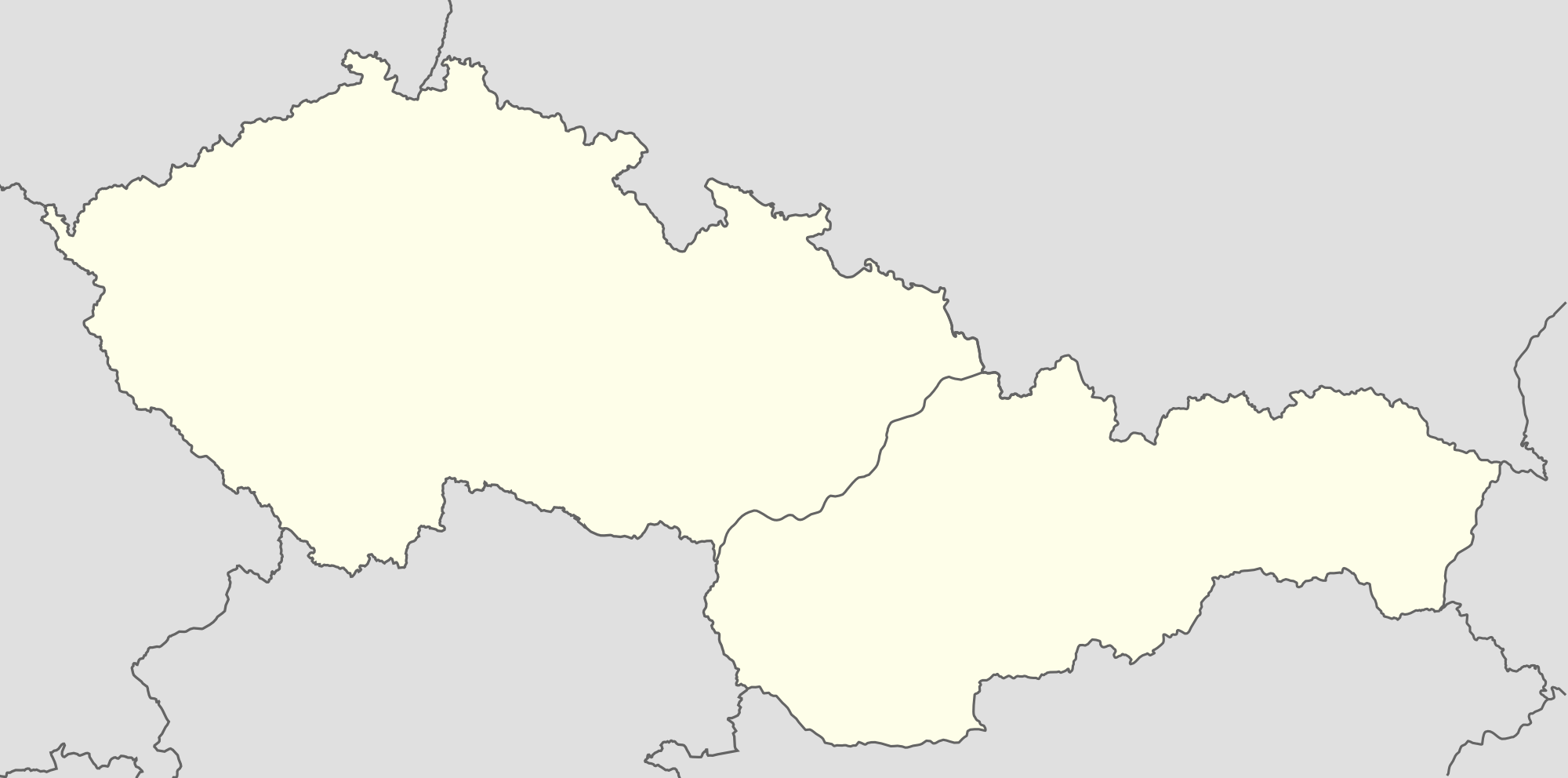
Location of clubs in the 1951 Czechoslovak First League

== League standings ==
Pos	Team	Pld	W	D	L	GF	GA	GR	Pts
1	NV Bratislava (C)	26	14	5	7	58	36	1.611	33
2	Sparta ČKD Sokolovo	26	13	7	6	63	42	1.500	33
3	Dynamo ČSD Košice	26	15	3	8	51	49	1.041	33
4	Vítkovické železárny	26	13	3	10	55	52	1.058	29
5	ATK Prague	26	12	4	10	50	53	0.943	28
6	ČSSZ Prešov	26	9	9	8	45	37	1.216	27
7	OKD Ostrava	26	12	3	11	42	41	1.024	27
8	Škoda Plzeň	26	11	5	10	45	48	0.938	27
9	Slovena Žilina	26	11	4	11	48	46	1.043	26
10	Vodotechna Teplice	26	10	5	11	50	56	0.893	25
11	Dynamo Slavia Prague (R)	26	11	2	13	60	62	0.968	24
12	Svit Gottwaldov (R)	26	9	5	12	62	50	1.240	23
13	Železničáři Prague (R)	26	7	6	13	52	58	0.897	20
14	ČKD Dukla Karlín (R)	26	2	5	19	25	76	0.329	9

Source: rsssf.com
(C) Champions; (R) Relegated

== Results ==
Home \ Away	ATK	KAR	PRE	KOŠ	DYN	NVB	OST	PLZ	ŽIL	SPA	GOT	VÍT	TEP	ŽEL
ATK Prague		5–0	3–0	2–1	3–2	0–1	1–2	0–1	1–0	0–4	5–4	2–1	3–2	3–1
ČKD Dukla Karlín	2–4		0–4	0–2	0–6	0–7	2–3	0–2	5–3	1–4	1–2	0–3	1–2	1–1
ČSSZ Prešov	2–2	4–1		1–1	5–0	1–2	4–1	2–1	1–0	2–0	1–2	1–1	4–2	1–3
Dynamo ČSD Košice	1–1	4–1	0–0		5–1	2–3	2–1	3–0	2–1	3–1	3–0	4–1	4–1	1–0
Dynamo Slavia Prague	4–0	2–0	2–0	2–3		2–5	3–2	3–1	7–3	3–0	0–4	1–3	1–0	2–2
NV Bratislava	1–2	1–1	2–2	1–2	6–1		2–1	1–1	2–0	2–1	1–2	4–2	0–0	3–1
OKD Ostrava	1–1	2–1	4–1	4–0	3–2	2–0		0–1	0–1	0–4	3–2	3–2	1–3	1–0
Škoda Plzeň	4–3	1–2	0–2	2–0	4–4	2–0	0–2		3–3	4–4	2–2	2–1	1–0	1–3
Slovena Žilina	2–2	3–0	2–0	4–1	1–0	4–3	0–0	0–1		2–3	3–2	3–2	3–1	5–1
Sparta ČKD Sokolovo	7–1	4–0	1–1	2–1	2–1	2–2	3–2	3–0	1–1		2–1	3–2	1–0	3–3
Svit Gottwaldov	1–3	1–1	1–1	13–0	2–4	2–3	0–0	1–3	2–1	1–1		1–2	4–1	3–1
Vítkovické železárny	2–1	4–3	2–1	2–3	3–1	1–0	1–0	5–2	2–3	2–1	3–2		1–1	1–5
Vodotechna Teplice	3–1	1–1	2–2	4–1	2–6	1–4	2–0	4–3	1–0	4–3	2–5	2–2		5–1
Železničáři Prague	4–1	1–1	2–2	1–2	3–0	1–2	3–4	0–3	3–0	3–3	3–2	3–4	3–4	

Source: statistiky1ligy.fotbal.cz
Legend: Blue = home team win; Yellow = draw; Red = away team win.
