= Jiří Pešek =

Czech footballer and manager (1927–2011)

Personal information
- Date of birth: 4 June 1927
- Place of birth: Prague, Czechoslovakia
- Date of death: 20 May 2011 (aged 83)
- Place of death: Czech Republic
- Position: Striker

Senior career*
Years	Team	Apps	(Gls)
1939–1951	Bohemians Prague		
1952–1955	Sparta Prague		
1956–1959	Slavia Prague		
1959–1965	Motorlet Prague		

International career
1947–1957	Czechoslovakia	11	(1)

Managerial career
- Viktoria Žižkov
- 1967–1969: Baník Příbram
- 1970: Sparta Chicago
- 1975–1976: Panserraikos
- 1978–1980: Finland (olympic)
- 1981: Valur
- 1982–1983: North Yemen
- 1993–1994: India
- * Club domestic league appearances and goals

Jiří Pešek (4 June 1927 in Prague – 20 May 2011) was a Czech football player and manager.

Pešek played for several clubs, including Bohemians Praha (1939–1951), Sparta Prague (1952–1955) and SK Slavia Praha (1956–1959).

He played for Czechoslovakia national team (11 matches and one goal), and was a participant at the 1954 FIFA World Cup, where he played in a match against Uruguay.

He coached Viktoria Žižkov, Baník Příbram, Sparta Chicago, Panserraikos, Finland, Valur, North Yemen and India.

== Honours ==
=== Manager ===
India

- SAFF Championship: 1993
