= Rudá Hvězda Brno =

Czechoslovak football club

RH Brno
- Full name: Rudá Hvezda Brno
- Final season 1961–62: 1st in Czechoslovak 2nd League

Rudá Hvezda Brno, also known as Red Star Brno and RH Brno, was a Czechoslovak football club from the city of Brno. The club existed from 1956 until 1962, playing four seasons in the Czechoslovak First League, the country's top flight. After the 1961/62 season it amalgamated with Spartak ZJŠ Brno.

== First division rankings ==
- 1957/58 – 7th
- 1958/59 – 5th
- 1959/60 – 10th
- 1960/61 – 12th

== Honours ==
- Czechoslovak Cup: 1959/60

== European competition ==
- Q = Preliminary round
- 1/4 = Quarter finals

Season	Competition	Round	Country	Club	Score
1960–61	Cup Winners Cup	Q	East Germany	Vorwärts Berlin	1–2, 2–0
		1/4	(Socialist Federal Republic of Yugoslavia) Yugoslavia	Dinamo Zagreb	0–0, 0–2
