= Juraj Kakaš =

Slovak footballer

Personal information
- Full name: Juraj Kakaš
- Date of birth: 17 June 1971 (age 55)
- Place of birth: Bratislava, Czechoslovakia
- Position: Goalkeeper

Youth career
- Horses Šúrovce
- Spartak Trnava

Senior career*
Years	Team	Apps	(Gls)
1992–1994	Slovan Bratislava	4	(0)
1992–1993	→ Spartak Trnava (loan)	9	(0)
1996	Petržalka	7	(0)
1997–1999	Rimavská Sobota	61	(0)
1999–2002	Ashdod	70	(0)
- * Club domestic league appearances and goals

Juraj Kakaš (born 17 June 1971) is a former football goalkeeper.

== Career ==
Slovan Bratislava (champion 1993 and 1994), Spartak Trnava, Artmedia Bratislava, Rimavska Sobota. Goalkeeper of the year in Slovakia 1997, and SC Ashdod (Israel), Coach of Goalkeepers, UEFA B licence holder, coach in Slovan Bratislava (Slovakia), AC Milan Academy Sydney (Australia), Coerver Vancouver (Canada), BedHead FC (UK), Sussex House school Chelsea (UK), Tottenham Hotspur ladies (UK)
