= 1953 Czechoslovak First League =

Czechoslovak First League
- Season: 1953
- Dates: 10 March – 29 October
- Champions: ÚDA Praha
- Relegated: Slavoj Liberec; Slavia Bratislava VS; Jiskra Gottwaldov; FC Lokomotíva Košice
- Top goalscorer: Josef Majer (13 goals)

Statistics of Czechoslovak First League in the 1953 season.

== Overview ==
It was contested by 14 teams, and ÚDA Praha won the championship. Josef Majer was the league's top scorer with 13 goals.

== Stadia and locations ==
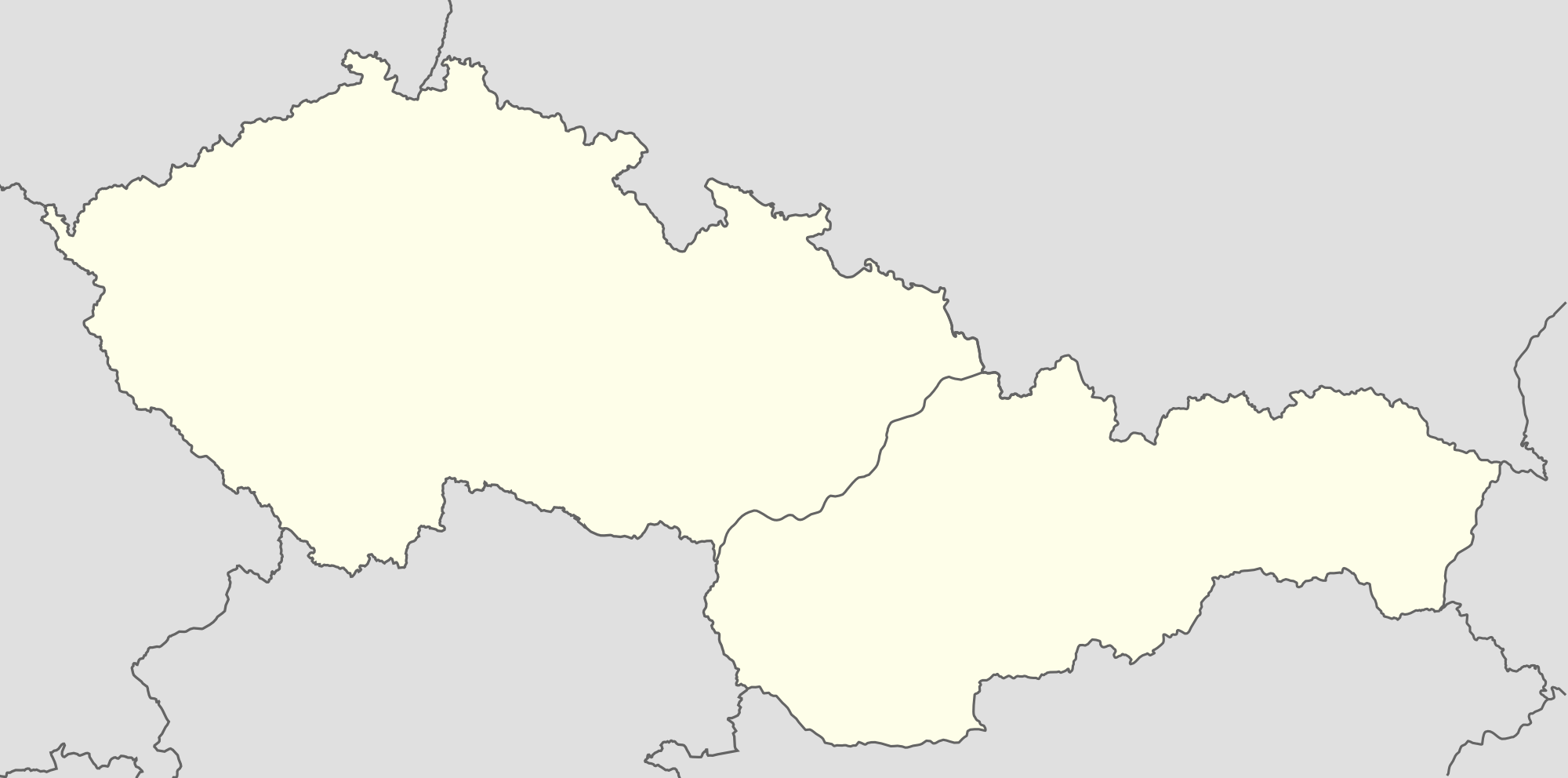
Location of clubs in the 1953 Czechoslovak First League

== League standings ==
| Pos | Team | Pld | W | D | L | GF | GA | GR | Pts |
|---|---|---|---|---|---|---|---|---|---|
| 1 | ÚDA Prague (C) | 13 | 10 | 2 | 1 | 41 | 12 | 3.417 | 22 |
| 2 | Spartak Prague Sokolovo | 13 | 9 | 1 | 3 | 26 | 18 | 1.444 | 19 |
| 3 | CH Bratislava | 13 | 8 | 2 | 3 | 24 | 14 | 1.714 | 18 |
| 4 | Křídla vlasti Olomouc | 13 | 7 | 3 | 3 | 17 | 7 | 2.429 | 17 |
| 5 | Baník Kladno | 13 | 7 | 2 | 4 | 36 | 22 | 1.636 | 16 |
| 6 | Tatran Prešov | 13 | 6 | 3 | 4 | 26 | 23 | 1.130 | 15 |
| 7 | Tankista Prague | 13 | 6 | 2 | 5 | 32 | 25 | 1.280 | 14 |
| 8 | Dynamo Prague | 13 | 6 | 2 | 5 | 22 | 22 | 1.000 | 14 |
| 9 | ŠK Slovan Bratislava | 13 | 5 | 3 | 5 | 26 | 21 | 1.238 | 13 |
| 10 | FC Baník Ostrava | 13 | 4 | 2 | 7 | 15 | 25 | 0.600 | 10 |
| 11 | Slavoj Liberec (R) | 13 | 3 | 1 | 9 | 19 | 37 | 0.514 | 7 |
| 12 | Slavia Bratislava VS (R) | 13 | 2 | 2 | 9 | 17 | 30 | 0.567 | 6 |
| 13 | Jiskra Gottwaldov (R) | 13 | 2 | 2 | 9 | 18 | 34 | 0.529 | 6 |
| 14 | Lokomotíva Košice (R) | 13 | 2 | 1 | 10 | 12 | 41 | 0.293 | 5 |

Source: rsssf.com
(C) Champions; (R) Relegated

== Results ==
| Home \ Away | KLA | OST | BRA | DYN | GOT | OLO | LOK | SBV | LIB | SLO | SPA | TAN | PRE | ÚDA |
|---|---|---|---|---|---|---|---|---|---|---|---|---|---|---|
| Baník Kladno | | 2–2 | | | | 3–1 | 7–1 | | 5–2 | | 1–3 | | 7–1 | 1–3 |
| Baník Ostrava | | | | 3–1 | | | 1–0 | | 1–2 | 0–3 | | 3–2 | 1–4 | |
| ČH Bratislava | 0–2 | 1–1 | | 2–1 | 6–1 | | | 3–0 | | 4–2 | | 2–1 | | |
| Dynamo Prague | 1–1 | | | | | 1–1 | 2–0 | 1–0 | | | | | 2–1 | 3–0 |
| Jiskra Gottwaldov | 2–5 | 4–1 | | 1–2 | | 1–2 | | 2–2 | | 0–2 | | 1–3 | | |
| Křídla vlasti Olomouc | | 1–0 | 0–1 | | | | 5–0 | | 1–0 | | 0–1 | | 3–0 | 0–0 |
| Lokomotíva Košice | | | 0–1 | | 1–1 | | | | 3–1 | 3–2 | 1–2 | 0–4 | | |
| Slávia Bratislava VŠ | 2–0 | 1–2 | | | | 0–2 | 3–1 | | 2–2 | | | | 0–2 | 1–4 |
| Slavoj Liberec | | | 1–2 | 3–0 | 1–2 | | | | | 2–1 | 3–4 | 2–4 | | |
| Slovan Bratislava | 3–0 | | | 4–2 | | 0–0 | | 2–1 | | | | | 1–1 | 3–4 |
| Spartak Sokolovo Prague | | 3–0 | 2–1 | 1–3 | 1–0 | | | 3–1 | | 1–1 | | 3–1 | | |
| Tankista Prague | 1–2 | | | 5–3 | | 0–1 | | 6–4 | | 3–2 | | | | 1–1 |
| Tatran Prešov | | | 1–1 | | 3–1 | | 5–2 | | 5–0 | | 2–1 | 1–1 | | |
| ÚDA Prague | | 1–0 | 2–0 | | 5–2 | | 7–0 | | 7–0 | | 4–1 | | 3–0 | |

Source: statistiky1ligy.fotbal.cz
Legend: Blue = home team win; Yellow = draw; Red = away team win.
