= Dukla Pardubice =

Czech football club, based in Pardubice

- Full name: Dukla Pardubice
- Founded: 1953
- Dissolved: 1961 (merged with VCHZ Pardubice)
- Ground: Letní stadion, Pardubice
- 1960–61: II. Liga, group B, 2nd

Dukla Pardubice was a Czechoslovak football club. Founded in 1953 as Tankista Praha in the capital city of Prague, the club moved to the city of Pardubice in 1956 and subsequently became Dukla Pardubice. In its eight-year existence, the club spent six seasons in the Czechoslovak First League.

== League history ==
The club played as Tankista Praha in the 1953–1955 seasons of the Czechoslovak First League. In 1956 they moved to Pardubice and competed as Tankista in 1956's II. Liga, group A, in which they finished first. In the 1957–58 season, under the revised name of Dukla Pardubice, the club again contested the Czechoslovak First League, where they played until 1960. In 1960–61 Dukla again played in the II. Liga, this time in group B, and finished in second place behind Spartak Královo Pole Brno. Later in 1961 the club merged with VCHZ Pardubice and ceased to exist in its own right.

== Stadia ==
Upon moving to Pardubice, the club played at a speedway stadium, the Svítkov Stadium in Pardubice's Svítkov area, due to ongoing renovation at the city's football stadium, Letní stadion. During the season they moved into Letní stadion.

== Players ==
The club's leading scorer in the Czechoslovak First League was Bedřich Šonka, who scored 25 goals. The player with the most appearances is Miroslav Ošťádal. Four of their players were included in the Czechoslovakia squad for the 1962 FIFA World Cup: Jan Lála, Andrej Kvašňák, Vladimír Kos and Tomáš Pospíchal. Other notable players included Zdeněk Zikán, Karel Nepomucký, Vojtech Masný and Jozef Vengloš.

== Historical names ==
- 1953 Tankista Praha
- 1956 Tankista Pardubice
- 1957 Dukla Pardubice
