= Miroslav Wiecek =

Czech footballer

Personal information
- Date of birth: 4 November 1931
- Place of birth: Ostrava, Czechoslovakia
- Date of death: 12 July 1997 (aged 65)
- Position: Striker

Senior career*
Years	Team	Apps	(Gls)
1948–1964	Baník Ostrava	325	(174)
1964–1967	TJ Vítkovice		
1968–1970	Tatra Kopřivnice		

International career
1953	Czechoslovakia	1	(0)
- * Club domestic league appearances and goals

Miroslav Wiecek (4 November 1931 in Ostrava – 12 July 1997) was a Czech football player.

Wiecek played most of his career for Baník Ostrava. He played 325 matches and scored 174 goals in the Czechoslovak First League, four times becoming the top goalscorer of the league.

He played one match for Czechoslovakia national team, in October 1953 against Hungary.
