= Czechoslovak First League =

- Founded: 1925
- Folded: 1993
- Country: Czechoslovakia
- Confederation: UEFA
- Number of clubs: 16 (in 1993)
- Level on pyramid: 1
- Domestic cup: Czechoslovak Cup
- International cup(s): European Cup; UEFA Cup
- Most championships: Sparta Prague (21 titles)
- Top scorer: Josef Bican (447 goals)

The Czechoslovak First League (Czech: 1. fotbalová liga, Slovak: 1. futbalová liga) was the premier football league in Czechoslovakia from 1925 to 1993, with the exception of World War II. Czechoslovakia was occupied by German forces who formed Gauliga Sudetenland and Gauliga Böhmen und Mähren leagues on occupied territories. Until the 1934-35 season, no teams from Slovakia participated in the league.

Czechs were allowed to run their own league in the Protectorate of Bohemia and Moravia, while Slovaks were granted their own independent Slovak State and created their own league. After the World War II the league was recreated.

== Description ==
The league was dominated by clubs from Prague with Sparta Prague winning 19 titles, Dukla Prague 11 and Slavia Prague 9.

The attendance record for the league was set on 4 September 1965, when 50,105 spectators attended a match between rivals Sparta and Slavia in Prague.

The Czechoslovak First League was succeeded in 1993 by the Czech First League in the Czech Republic and the Slovak Superliga in Slovakia.

=== Names ===
- 1925 First Association League (Czech: Asociační liga) (teams from Prague only)
- 1925–29 Central Bohemian First League (Czech: Středočeská liga) (teams from Prague and Central Bohemia)
- 1929–34 First Association League (Czech: Asociační liga) (expanded to include Moravian teams)
- 1934–38 State League (Czech: Státní liga) (expanded to include Slovak teams)
- 1938–44 Bohemian-Moravian League (Czech: Národní liga) (World War II, Czechoslovakia split)
- 1945–48 State League (Czech: Státní liga) (Czechoslovak Republic reinstated)
- 1949–50 First All-National Championship (Czech: Celostátní mistrovství)
- 1951–55 Republic Championship (Czech: Mistrovství republiky (1951–52), Přebor republiky (1953–55))
- 1956–93 First League (Czech: I. liga)

== Champions ==
=== 1925–1938 ===
| Season | Champions | Runner-up | Third place | Top Goalscorer | Club |
|---|---|---|---|---|---|
| 1925 | Slavia Prague | Sparta Prague | Viktoria Žižkov | Jan Vaník (13) | Slavia Prague |
| 1925–26 | Sparta Prague | Slavia Prague | Viktoria Žižkov | Jan Dvořáček (32) | Sparta Prague |
| 1927 | Sparta Prague | Slavia Prague | Vršovice | Antonín Puč (13); Josef Šíma (13) | Slavia Prague; Sparta Prague |
| 1927–28 | Viktoria Žižkov | Slavia Prague | Sparta Prague | Karel Meduna (12) | Viktoria Žižkov |
| 1928–29 | Slavia Prague | Viktoria Žižkov | Sparta Prague | Antonín Puč (13) | Slavia Prague |
| 1929–30 | Slavia Prague | Sparta Prague | Viktoria Žižkov | František Kloz (15) | Kladno |
| 1930–31 | Slavia Prague | Sparta Prague | Bohemians Vršovice | Josef Silný (18) | Sparta Prague |
| 1931–32 | Sparta Prague | Slavia Prague | Bohemians Vršovice | Raymond Braine (16) | Sparta Prague |
| 1932–33 | Slavia Prague | Sparta Prague | Viktoria Plzeň | Gejza Kocsis (23) | Teplitzer FK / Bohemians Prague |
| 1933–34 | Slavia Prague | Sparta Prague | Kladno | Raymond Braine (18); Jiří Sobotka (18) | Sparta Prague; Slavia Prague |
| 1934–35 | Slavia Prague | Sparta Prague | Židenice | František Svoboda (27) | Slavia Prague |
| 1935–36 | Sparta Prague | Slavia Prague | Prostějov | Vojtěch Bradáč (42) | Slavia Prague |
| 1936–37 | Slavia Prague | Sparta Prague | Prostějov | František Kloz (28) | Kladno |
| 1937–38 | Sparta Prague | Slavia Prague | Židenice | Josef Bican (22) | Slavia Prague |

=== Bohemia-Moravia 1938–1944 ===
| Season | Champions | Runner-up | Third place | Top Goalscorer | Club |
|---|---|---|---|---|---|
| 1938–39 | Sparta Prague | Slavia Prague | SK Pardubice | Josef Bican (29) | Slavia Prague |
| 1939–40 | Slavia Prague | Sparta Prague | SK Pardubice | Josef Bican (50) | Slavia Prague |
| 1940–41 | Slavia Prague | SK Plzeň | SK Pardubice | Josef Bican (38) | Slavia Prague |
| 1941–42 | Slavia Prague | SK Prostějov | Viktoria Plzeň | Josef Bican (45) | Slavia Prague |
| 1942–43 | Slavia Prague | Sparta Prague | Baťa Zlín | Josef Bican (39) | Slavia Prague |
| 1943–44 | Sparta Prague | Slavia Prague | Baťa Zlín | Josef Bican (57) | Slavia Prague |

=== 1945–1993 ===
| Season | Champions | Runner-up | Third place | Top Goalscorer | Club |
|---|---|---|---|---|---|
| 1945–46 | Sparta Prague | Slavia Prague | – | Josef Bican (31) | Slavia Prague |
| 1946–47 | Slavia Prague | Sparta Prague | Kladno | Josef Bican (43) | Slavia Prague |
| 1947–48 | Sparta Prague | Slavia Prague | Bratislava | Jaroslav Cejp (21) | Sparta Prague |
| 1948 | not completed | | | Josef Bican (21) | Slavia Prague |
| 1949 | NV Bratislava | Bratrstvi Sparta | Železničáři Prague | Ladislav Hlaváček (28) | Slavia Prague |
| 1950 | NV Bratislava | Bratrstvi Sparta | Železničáři Prague | Josef Bican (22) | Vítkovické železárny |
| 1951 | NV Bratislava | Sparta CKD Sokolovo | Dynamo ČSD Košice | Alois Jaroš (16) | Vodotechna Teplice |
| 1952 | Sparta CKD Sokolovo | NV Bratislava | Ingstav Teplice | Miroslav Wiecek (20) | OKD Ostrava |
| 1953 | ÚDA Prague | Spartak Praga Sokolovo | ČH Bratislava | Josef Majer (13) | Baník Kladno |
| 1954 | Spartak Praga Sokolovo | Baník Ostrava | ČH Bratislava | Jiří Pešek (13) | Spartak Praga Sokolovo |
| 1955 | Slovan Bratislava | ÚDA Prague | Spartak Praga Sokolovo | Emil Pažický (9) | Slovan Bratislava / Iskra Žilina |
| 1956 | Dukla Prague | Slovan Bratislava | Spartak Praga Sokolovo | Milan Dvořák (15); Miroslav Wiecek (15) | Dukla Prague; Baník Ostrava |
| 1957–58 | Dukla Prague | Spartak Praga Sokolovo | ČH Bratislava | Miroslav Wiecek (25) | Baník Ostrava |
| 1958–59 | ČH Bratislava | Dukla Prague | Dynamo Prague | Miroslav Wiecek (20) | Baník Ostrava |
| 1959–60 | Spartak Hradec Kralové | Slovan Bratislava | Dukla Prague | Michal Pucher (18) | Slovan Nitra |
| 1960–61 | Dukla Prague | ČH Bratislava | Slovan Bratislava | Rudolf Kučera (17); Ladislav Pavlovič (17) | Dukla Prague; Tatran Prešov |
| 1961–62 | Dukla Prague | Slovan Nitra | ČH Bratislava | Adolf Scherer (24) | ČH Bratislava |
| 1962–63 | Dukla Prague | Jednota Trenčín | Baník Ostrava | Karel Petroš (19) | Tatran Prešov |
| 1963–64 | Dukla Prague | Slovan Bratislava | Tatran Prešov | Ladislav Pavlovič (21) | Tatran Prešov |
| 1964–65 | Sparta Prague | Tatran Prešov | VSS Košice | Pavol Bencz (21) | Jednota Trenčín |
| 1965–66 | Dukla Prague | Sparta Prague | Slavia Prague | Ladislav Michalík (15) | Baník Ostrava |
| 1966–67 | Sparta Prague | Slovan Bratislava | Spartak Trnava | Jozef Adamec (21) | Spartak Trnava |
| 1967–68 | Spartak Trnava | Slovan Bratislava | Jednota Trenčín | Jozef Adamec (18) | Spartak Trnava |
| 1968–69 | Spartak Trnava | Slovan Bratislava | Sparta Prague | Ladislav Petráš (20) | Dukla Banská Bystrica |
| 1969–70 | Slovan Bratislava | Spartak Trnava | Sparta Prague | Jozef Adamec (18) | Spartak Trnava |
| 1970–71 | Spartak Trnava | VSS Košice | Union Teplice | Jozef Adamec (16); Zdeněk Nehoda (16) | Spartak Trnava; TJ Gottwaldov |
| 1971–72 | Spartak Trnava | Slovan Bratislava | Dukla Prague | Ján Čapkovič (19) | Slovan Bratislava |
| 1972–73 | Spartak Trnava | Tatran Prešov | VSS Košice | Ladislav Józsa (21) | Lokomotíva Košice |
| 1973–74 | Slovan Bratislava | Dukla Prague | Slavia Prague | Ladislav Józsa (17); Přemysl Bičovský (17) | Lokomotíva Košice; Sklo Union Teplice |
| 1974–75 | Slovan Bratislava | Inter Bratislava | Bohemians Prague | Ladislav Petráš (20) | Inter Bratislava |
| 1975–76 | Baník Ostrava | Slovan Bratislava | Slavia Prague | Dušan Galis (21) | VSS Košice |
| 1976–77 | Dukla Prague | Inter Bratislava | Slavia Prague | Ladislav Józsa (18) | Lokomotíva Košice |
| 1977–78 | Zbrojovka Brno | Dukla Prague | Lokomotíva Košice | Karel Kroupa (20) | Zbrojovka Brno |
| 1978–79 | Dukla Prague | Baník Ostrava | Zbrojovka Brno | Karel Kroupa (17); Zdeněk Nehoda (17) | Zbrojovka Brno; Dukla Prague |
| 1979–80 | Baník Ostrava | Zbrojovka Brno | Bohemians Prague | Werner Lička (18) | Baník Ostrava |
| 1980–81 | Baník Ostrava | Dukla Prague | Bohemians Prague | Marián Masný (16) | Slovan Bratislava |
| 1981–82 | Dukla Prague | Baník Ostrava | Bohemians Prague | Peter Herda (15); Ladislav Vízek (15) | Slavia Prague; Dukla Prague |
| 1982–83 | Bohemians Prague | Baník Ostrava | Sparta Prague | Pavel Chaloupka (17) | Bohemians Prague |
| 1983–84 | Sparta Prague | Dukla Prague | Bohemians Prague | Werner Lička (20) | Baník Ostrava |
| 1984–85 | Sparta Prague | Bohemians Prague | Slavia Prague | Ivo Knoflíček (21) | Slavia Prague |
| 1985–86 | TJ Vítkovice | Sparta Prague | Dukla Prague | Stanislav Griga (19) | Sparta Prague |
| 1986–87 | Sparta Prague | TJ Vítkovice | Bohemians Prague | Václav Daněk (24) | Baník Ostrava |
| 1987–88 | Sparta Prague | Dukla Prague | DAC 1904 Dunajská Streda | Milan Luhový (24) | Dukla Prague |
| 1988–89 | Sparta Prague | Baník Ostrava | Plastika Nitra | Milan Luhový (25) | Dukla Prague |
| 1989–90 | Sparta Prague | Baník Ostrava | Inter Bratislava | Ľubomír Luhový (20) | Inter Bratislava |
| 1990–91 | Sparta Prague | Slovan Bratislava | Sigma Olomouc | Roman Kukleta (17) | Sparta Prague |
| 1991–92 | Slovan Bratislava | Sparta Prague | Sigma Olomouc | Peter Dubovský (27) | Slovan Bratislava |
| 1992–93 | Sparta Prague | Slavia Prague | Slovan Bratislava | Peter Dubovský (24) | Slovan Bratislava |

== Performance by club ==
| Club | Winners | Winning Years |
|---|---|---|
| Sparta Prague | 21 | 1925–26, 1927, 1931–32, 1935–36, 1937–38, 1938–39, 1943–44, 1945–46, 1947–48, 1952, 1954, 1964–65, 1966–67, 1983–84, 1984–85, 1986–87, 1987–88, 1988–89, 1989–90, 1990–91, 1992–93 |
| SK Slavia Prague | 13 | 1925, 1928–29, 1929–30, 1930–31, 1932–33, 1934, 1934–35, 1936–37, 1939–40, 1940–41, 1941–42, 1942–43, 1946–47 |
| Dukla Prague / ÚDA Prague | 11 | 1953, 1956, 1957–58, 1960–61, 1961–62, 1962–63, 1963–64, 1965–66, 1976–77, 1978–79, 1981–82 |
| SK Slovan Bratislava / NV Bratislava | 8 | 1949, 1950, 1951, 1955, 1969–70, 1973–74, 1974–75, 1991–92 |
| FC Spartak Trnava | 5 | 1967–68, 1968–69, 1970–71, 1971–72, 1972–73 |
| FC Baník Ostrava | 3 | 1975–76, 1979–80, 1980–81 |
| TJ Vítkovice | 1 | 1985–86 |
| FK Viktoria Žižkov | 1 | 1927–28 |
| FC Bohemians Prague | 1 | 1982–83 |
| FC Zbrojovka Brno | 1 | 1977–78 |
| Spartak Hradec Králové | 1 | 1959–60 |
| FK Inter Bratislava | 1 | 1958–59 |

== Player records ==
Josef Bican was the all-time top goalscorer of the league with 447 goals in 279 matches, of which 417 goals were scored for Slavia Prague and 30 goals for FC Vítkovice. The list below is not the league's top goalscorers all in all, only players who at some point played for Slavia Prague.

=== Top goalscorers (players who played for Slavia Prague only) ===
| # | Name | Goals | Years |
|---|---|---|---|
| 1 | (Austria) (Czechoslovakia) Josef Bican | 447 | 1937–51, 1953–56 |
| 2 | (Czechoslovakia) Vlastimil Kopecký | 252 | 1932–51 |
| 3 | (Czechoslovakia) František Kloz | 175 | 1926–45 |
| 4 | (Czechoslovakia) Ladislav Kareš | 163 | 1941–51 |
| 5 | (Czechoslovakia) Vojtěch Bradáč | 155 | 1926–36, 1937–45 |
| 6 | (Czechoslovakia) Jiří Pešek | 151 | 1939–65 |
| 7 | (Czechoslovakia) Otto Hemele | 133 | 1937–65 |
| 8 | (Czechoslovakia) Josef Silný | 127 | 1923–33, 1934–40 |
| 9 | (Czechoslovakia) Antonín Puč | 123 | 1925–40 |
| 10 | (Czechoslovakia) Josef Kadraba | 117 | 1953–67 |

== See also ==
- Czechoslovak Cup
- Czech First League
- Slovak Superliga
