= 1958 FIFA World Cup Group 3 =

Football tournament group stage

Group 3 of the 1958 FIFA World Cup took place from 8 to 17 June 1958. The group consisted of Hungary, Mexico, Sweden, and Wales.

== Standings ==
Pos	Team	Pld	W	D	L	GF	GA	GR	Pts	Qualification
1	Sweden	3	2	1	0	5	1	5.000	5	Advance to knockout stage
2	Wales	3	0	3	0	2	2	1.000	3 (Note: Wales finished ahead of Hungary by winning a play-off.)	Advance to knockout stage
3	Hungary	3	1	1	1	6	3	2.000	3	
4	Mexico	3	0	1	2	1	8	0.125	1	

Source: FIFA

== Matches ==
All times listed are local time.

=== Sweden vs Mexico ===
8 June 1958
14:00 (CET)

Sweden	3–0	Mexico
Simonsson 17', 64'; Liedholm 57' (pen.)

Råsunda Stadium, Solna
Attendance: 34,107
Referee: Nikolay Latyshev (Soviet Union)

Sweden
Mexico

GK	1	Kalle Svensson
RB	2	Orvar Bergmark
CH	14	Bengt Gustavsson
LB	3	Sven Axbom
RH	4	Nils Liedholm (c)
LH	6	Sigge Parling
OR	7	Kurt Hamrin
IR	8	Gunnar Gren
CF	9	Agne Simonsson
IL	20	Bror Mellberg
OL	11	Lennart Skoglund
Manager:
(England) George Raynor

GK	1	Antonio Carbajal (c)
RB	2	Jesús del Muro
CB	3	Jorge Romo
LB	4	José Villegas
RH	5	Alfonso Portugal
LH	6	Francisco Flores
OR	7	Alfredo Hernández
IR	8	Salvador Reyes
CF	10	Crescencio Gutiérrez
IL	9	Carlos Calderón de la Barca
OL	11	Enrique Sesma
Manager:
(Spain) Antonio López Herranz

=== Hungary vs Wales ===
8 June 1958
19:00 (CET)

Hungary	1–1	Wales
Bozsik 5'		J. Charles 27'

Jernvallen, Sandviken
Attendance: 15,343
Referee: José María Codesal (Uruguay)

Hungary
Wales

GK	1	Gyula Grosics
RB	2	Sándor Mátrai
CH	3	Ferenc Sipos
LB	4	László Sárosi
RH	5	József Bozsik
LH	6	Pál Berendy
OR	11	Károly Sándor
IR	9	Nándor Hidegkuti (c)
CF	8	Lajos Tichy
IL	10	Dezső Bundzsák
CF	21	Máté Fenyvesi
Manager:
Lajos Baróti

GK	1	Jack Kelsey
RB	2	Stuart Williams
CH	5	Mel Charles
LB	3	Mel Hopkins
RH	4	Derrick Sullivan
LH	6	Dave Bowen (c)
OR	19	Colin Webster
IR	7	Terry Medwin
CF	9	John Charles
IL	10	Ivor Allchurch
OL	11	Cliff Jones
Manager:
Jimmy Murphy

=== Mexico vs Wales ===
11 June 1958
19:00 (CET)

Mexico	1–1	Wales
Belmonte 89'		I. Allchurch 32'

Råsunda Stadium, Solna
Attendance: 15,150
Referee: Leo Lemesic (Yugoslavia)

Mexico
Wales

GK	1	Antonio Carbajal (c)
RB	2	Jesús del Muro
CB	14	Miguel Gutiérrez
LB	17	Raúl Cárdenas
RH	3	Jorge Romo
LH	6	Francisco Flores
OR	19	Jaime Belmonte
IR	8	Salvador Reyes
CF	22	Carlos González
IL	20	Carlos Blanco
OL	11	Enrique Sesma
Manager:
(Spain) Antonio López Herranz

GK	1	Jack Kelsey
RB	2	Stuart Williams
CH	5	Mel Charles
LB	3	Mel Hopkins
RH	15	Colin Baker
LB	6	Dave Bowen (c)
OR	19	Colin Webster
IR	7	Terry Medwin
CF	9	John Charles
IL	10	Ivor Allchurch
OL	11	Cliff Jones
Manager:
Jimmy Murphy

=== Sweden vs Hungary ===
12 June 1958
19:00 (CET)

Sweden	2–1	Hungary
Hamrin 34', 55'		Tichy 77'

Råsunda Stadium, Solna
Attendance: 38,850
Referee: Jack Mowat (Scotland)

Sweden
Hungary

GK	1	Kalle Svensson
RB	2	Orvar Bergmark
CH	14	Bengt Gustavsson
LB	3	Sven Axbom
RH	4	Nils Liedholm (c)
LH	6	Sigge Parling
OR	7	Kurt Hamrin
IR	8	Gunnar Gren
CF	9	Agne Simonsson
IL	20	Bror Mellberg
OL	11	Lennart Skoglund
Manager:
(England) George Raynor

GK	1	Gyula Grosics
RB	2	Sándor Mátrai
CH	3	Ferenc Sipos
LB	4	László Sárosi
RH	14	Ferenc Szojka
LH	6	Pál Berendy
OR	11	Károly Sándor
IR	8	Lajos Tichy
SS	5	József Bozsik (c)
IL	10	Dezső Bundzsák
OL	21	Máté Fenyvesi
Manager:
Lajos Baróti

=== Sweden vs Wales ===
15 June 1958
14:00 (CET)

Sweden	0–0	Wales

Råsunda Stadium, Solna
Attendance: 30,287
Referee: Lucien van Nuffel (Belgium)

Sweden
Wales

GK	1	Kalle Svensson
RB	2	Orvar Bergmark
CH	14	Bengt Gustavsson (c)
LB	3	Sven Axbom
RH	15	Reino Börjesson
LH	6	Sigge Parling
OR	21	Bengt Berndtsson
IR	10	Arne Selmosson
CF	19	Henry Källgren
IL	18	Gösta Löfgren
OL	11	Lennart Skoglund
Manager:
(England) George Raynor

GK	1	Jack Kelsey
RB	2	Stuart Williams
CH	5	Mel Charles
LB	3	Mel Hopkins
RH	4	Derrick Sullivan
LH	6	Dave Bowen (c)
OR	18	Roy Vernon
IR	8	Ron Hewitt
CF	9	John Charles
IL	10	Ivor Allchurch
OL	11	Cliff Jones
Manager:
Jimmy Murphy

=== Hungary vs Mexico ===
15 June 1958
19:00 (CET)

Hungary	4–0	Mexico
Tichy 19', 46'; Sándor 54'; Bencsics 69'

Jernvallen, Sandviken
Attendance: 13,300
Referee: Arne Eriksson (Finland)

Hungary
Mexico

GK	22	István Ilku
RB	2	Sándor Mátrai
CH	3	Ferenc Sipos
LB	4	László Sárosi
RH	14	Ferenc Szojka
LH	15	Antal Kotász
OR	7	László Budai
IR	20	József Bencsics
SS	9	Nándor Hidegkuti (c)
IL	8	Lajos Tichy
OL	11	Károly Sándor
Manager:
Lajos Baróti

GK	1	Antonio Carbajal (c)
RB	2	Jesús del Muro
CB	14	Miguel Gutiérrez
LB	15	Guillermo Sepúlveda
RH	17	Raúl Cárdenas
LH	6	Francisco Flores
OR	19	Jaime Belmonte
IR	8	Salvador Reyes
CF	22	Carlos González
IL	20	Carlos Blanco
OL	11	Enrique Sesma
Manager:
(Spain) Antonio López Herranz

=== Play-off: Wales vs Hungary ===
17 June 1958
19:00 (CET)

Wales	2–1	Hungary
I. Allchurch 55'; Medwin 76'		Tichy 33'

Råsunda Stadium, Solna
Attendance: 2,823
Referee: Nikolay Latyshev (Soviet Union)

Wales
Hungary

GK	1	Jack Kelsey
RB	2	Stuart Williams
CH	5	Mel Charles
LB	3	Mel Hopkins
RH	4	Derrick Sullivan
LH	6	Dave Bowen (c)
OR	7	Terry Medwin
IR	8	Ron Hewitt
CF	9	John Charles
IL	10	Ivor Allchurch
OL	11	Cliff Jones
Manager:
Jimmy Murphy

GK	1	Gyula Grosics
RB	2	Sándor Mátrai
CH	3	Ferenc Sipos	(red card) 79'
LB	4	László Sárosi
RH	5	József Bozsik (c)
LH	15	Antal Kotász
OR	7	László Budai
IR	20	József Bencsics
CF	8	Lajos Tichy
IL	10	Dezső Bundzsák
OL	21	Máté Fenyvesi
Manager:
Lajos Baróti

== See also ==
- Hungary at the FIFA World Cup
- Mexico at the FIFA World Cup
- Sweden at the FIFA World Cup
- Wales at the FIFA World Cup
