= 1958 FIFA World Cup knockout stage =

The knockout stage of the 1958 FIFA World Cup was the second and final stage of the competition, following the group stage. The knockout stage began on 19 June with the quarter-finals and ended on 29 June 1958 with the final match, held at the Råsunda Stadium in Solna. The top two teams from each group (eight in total) advanced to the knockout stage to compete in a single-elimination style tournament. A match for third place also was played between the two losing teams of the semi-finals.

Brazil won the final 5–2 against hosts Sweden for their first World Cup title.

== Qualified teams ==
The top two placed teams from each of the four groups qualified for the knockout stage.

Group	Winners	Runners-up
1	West Germany	Northern Ireland
2	France	Yugoslavia
3	Sweden	Wales
4	Brazil	Soviet Union

== Bracket ==
Quarter-finals
19 June – Gothenburg
Brazil	1
Wales	0
19 June – Norrköping
France	4
Northern Ireland	0
19 June – Solna
Sweden	2
Soviet Union	0
19 June – Malmö
West Germany	1
Yugoslavia	0

Semi-finals
24 June – Solna
Brazil	5
France	2
24 June – Gothenburg
Sweden	3
West Germany	1

Final
29 June – Solna
Brazil	5
Sweden	2
Match for third place
28 June – Gothenburg
France	6
West Germany	3

== Quarter-finals ==
=== Brazil vs Wales ===
This was the first time both countries faced each other. Wales were without John Charles for the match, as he had been injured in their play-off match against Hungary.

Wales were able to hold Brazil to a 0–0 draw for over an hour, until Pelé scored in the 66th minute, becoming both the youngest goal scorer in the tournament's history and the first player under the age of 18 to score at a World Cup.

19 June 1958
19:00 (CET)

Brazil	1–0	Wales
Pelé 66'

Ullevi, Gothenburg
Attendance: 25,923
Referee: Fritz Seipelt (Austria)

Brazil
Wales

GK	3	Gilmar
RB	14	De Sordi
CB	2	Bellini (c)
CB	15	Orlando
LB	12	Nílton Santos
DM	19	Zito
AM	6	Didi
OR	11	Garrincha
CF	18	Mazzola
CF	10	Pelé
OL	7	Zagallo
Manager:
Vicente Feola

GK	1	Jack Kelsey
RB	2	Stuart Williams
CB	5	Mel Charles
LB	3	Mel Hopkins
RH	4	Derrick Sullivan
LH	6	Dave Bowen (c)
OR	7	Terry Medwin
IR	8	Ron Hewitt
CF	19	Colin Webster
IL	10	Ivor Allchurch
OL	11	Cliff Jones
Manager:
Jimmy Murphy

Assistant referees:
Maurice Guigue (France)
Albert Dusch (West Germany)

=== France vs Northern Ireland ===
19 June 1958
19:00 (CET)

France	4–0	Northern Ireland
Wisnieski 44'; Fontaine 55', 63'; Piantoni 68'

Idrottsparken, Norrköping
Attendance: 11,800
Referee: Juan Gardeazábal Garay (Spain)

France
Northern Ireland

GK	1	Claude Abbes
RB	4	Raymond Kaelbel
CB	10	Robert Jonquet (c)
LB	5	André Lerond
RH	13	Armand Penverne
LH	12	Jean-Jacques Marcel
OR	22	Maryan Wisnieski
IR	17	Just Fontaine
SS	18	Raymond Kopa
IL	20	Roger Piantoni
OL	21	Jean Vincent
Manager:
Albert Batteux

GK	1	Harry Gregg
RB	5	Dick Keith
CB	2	Willie Cunningham
LB	3	Alf McMichael
RH	4	Danny Blanchflower (c)
LH	8	Wilbur Cush
OR	7	Billy Bingham
IR	13	Tommy Casey
CF	14	Jackie Scott
IL	10	Jimmy McIlroy
OL	11	Peter McParland
Manager:
Peter Doherty

=== Sweden vs Soviet Union ===
19 June 1958
19:00 (CET)

Sweden	2–0	Soviet Union
Hamrin 49'; Simonsson 88'

Råsunda Stadium, Solna
Attendance: 31,900
Referee: Reginald Leafe (England)

Sweden
Soviet Union

GK	1	Kalle Svensson
RB	2	Orvar Bergmark
CB	14	Bengt Gustavsson
LB	3	Sven Axbom
RH	15	Reino Börjesson
LH	6	Sigge Parling
OR	7	Kurt Hamrin
IR	8	Gunnar Gren
CF	9	Agne Simonsson
IL	4	Nils Liedholm (c)
OL	11	Lennart Skoglund
Manager:
(England) George Raynor

GK	1	Lev Yashin
RB	2	Vladimir Kesarev
CB	3	Konstantin Krizhevsky
LB	4	Boris Kuznetsov
RH	5	Yuri Voinov
LH	16	Viktor Tsarev
OR	17	Aleksandr Ivanov
IR	8	Valentin Ivanov
CF	9	Nikita Simonyan (c)
IL	10	Sergei Salnikov
OL	11	Anatoli Ilyin
Manager:
Gavriil Kachalin

=== West Germany vs Yugoslavia ===
19 June 1958
19:00 (CET)

West Germany	1–0	Yugoslavia
Rahn 12'

Malmö Stadion, Malmö
Attendance: 20,055
Referee: Raymond Wyssling (Switzerland)

West Germany
Yugoslavia

GK	1	Fritz Herkenrath
RB	7	Georg Stollenwerk
CB	2	Herbert Erhardt
LB	3	Erich Juskowiak
RH	4	Horst Eckel
LH	6	Horst Szymaniak
OR	8	Helmut Rahn
IR	9	Fritz Walter
CF	12	Uwe Seeler
IL	10	Alfred Schmidt
OL	11	Hans Schäfer (c)
Manager:
Sepp Herberger

GK	2	Srboljub Krivokuća
RB	3	Vasilije Šijaković
CB	6	Branko Zebec (c)
LB	4	Tomislav Crnković
RH	9	Vujadin Boškov
LH	8	Dobrosav Krstić
OR	12	Aleksandar Petaković
IR	19	Radivoje Ognjanović
CF	7	Miloš Milutinović
IL	13	Todor Veselinović
OL	17	Zdravko Rajkov
Manager:
Aleksandar Tirnanić

== Semi-finals ==
=== Brazil vs France ===
This was only the second time Brazil and France had ever faced each other, and the first in an official competition, having previously faced each other in a friendly match in Rio de Janeiro shortly after the 1930 FIFA World Cup.

Early on in the match, French captain Robert Jonquet tried to make a short pass to André Lerond, but was intercepted by Garrincha. After passing it to Zito, he was able to get the ball to Vavá, who scored Brazil's first goal in the first two minutes. However, Just Fontaine was able to score an equalizer for France seven minutes later, which was the first goal Brazil had conceded all tournament. In the 35th minute, Jonquet collided with Brazilian forward Vavá, causing a double fracture in his fibula. While Jonquet was off the pitch being treated, Didi scored in the 39th minute from 22 yards out to make it 2–1, giving Brazil the lead again. Brazil then scored a third goal just before half-time, but it was disallowed by referee Benjamin Griffiths after consulting the linesman.

Despite his injury in the first half, Jonquet returned to the field for the second half as to not leave France with 10 men due to substitutes not being allowed. He was moved to the left side of the field, swapping positions with Jean-Jacques Marcel, but spent most of the match limping on the left wing, effectively making it so that France were down to 10 men.

Following Jonquet's injury, Brazil started dominating the match. During the second half, Pelé scored a hat-trick, the first of his international career, in the span of 23 minutes. Roger Piantoni scored a second goal for France in the 83rd minute.

24 June 1958
19:00 (CET)

Brazil	5–2	France
Vavá 2'; Didi 39'; Pelé 52', 64', 75'		Fontaine 9'; Piantoni 83'

Råsunda Stadium, Solna
Attendance: 27,100
Referee: Benjamin Griffiths (Wales)

Brazil
France

GK	3	Gilmar
RB	14	De Sordi
CB	2	Hilderaldo Bellini (c)
CB	15	Orlando
LB	12	Nílton Santos
RH	19	Zito
LH	6	Didi
OR	11	Garrincha
CF	20	Vavá
CF	10	Pelé
OL	7	Mário Zagallo
Manager:
Vicente Feola

GK	1	Claude Abbes
RB	4	Raymond Kaelbel
CH	10	Robert Jonquet (c)
LB	5	André Lerond
RH	13	Armand Penverne
LH	12	Jean-Jacques Marcel
OR	22	Maryan Wisniewski
IR	17	Just Fontaine
SS	18	Raymond Kopa
IL	20	Roger Piantoni
OL	21	Jean Vincent
Manager:
Albert Batteux

Assistant referees:
Paul Wyssling (Switzerland)
Reg Leafe (England)

=== Sweden vs West Germany ===
24 June 1958
19:00 (CET)

Sweden	3–1	West Germany
Skoglund 32'; Gren 81'; Hamrin 88'		Schäfer 24'

Ullevi, Gothenburg
Attendance: 49,471
Referee: István Zsolt (Hungary)

Sweden
West Germany

GK	1	Kalle Svensson
RB	2	Orvar Bergmark
CH	14	Bengt Gustavsson
LB	3	Sven Axbom
RH	15	Reino Börjesson
LH	6	Sigge Parling
OR	7	Kurt Hamrin
IR	8	Gunnar Gren
CF	9	Agne Simonsson
IL	4	Nils Liedholm (c)
OL	11	Lennart Skoglund
Manager:
(England) George Raynor

GK	1	Fritz Herkenrath
RB	7	Georg Stollenwerk
CH	2	Herbert Erhardt
LB	3	Erich Juskowiak	(red card) 59'
RH	4	Horst Eckel
LH	6	Horst Szymaniak
OR	8	Helmut Rahn
IR	9	Fritz Walter
CF	12	Uwe Seeler
IL	11	Hans Schäfer (c)
OL	14	Hans Cieslarczyk
Manager:
Sepp Herberger

== Match for third place ==
28 June 1958
17:00 (CET)

France	6–3	West Germany
Fontaine 16', 36', 78', 89'; Kopa 27' (pen.); Douis 50'		Cieslarczyk 18'; Rahn 52'; Schäfer 84'

Ullevi, Gothenburg
Attendance: 32,483
Referee: Juan Regis Brozzi (Argentina)

France
West Germany

GK	1	Claude Abbes
RB	4	Raymond Kaelbel
CB	11	Maurice Lafont
LB	5	André Lerond
RH	13	Armand Penverne (c)
LH	12	Jean-Jacques Marcel
OR	22	Maryan Wisnieski
IR	16	Yvon Douis
CF	18	Raymond Kopa
IL	17	Just Fontaine
OL	21	Jean Vincent
Manager:
Albert Batteux

GK	22	Heinz Kwiatkowski
RB	7	Georg Stollenwerk
CB	5	Heinz Wewers
LB	2	Herbert Erhardt
RH	17	Karl-Heinz Schnellinger
LH	6	Horst Szymaniak
OR	8	Helmut Rahn
IR	16	Hans Sturm
CF	15	Alfred Kelbassa
IL	11	Hans Schäfer (c)
OL	14	Hans Cieslarczyk
Manager:
Sepp Herberger

== Final ==
29 June 1958
15:00 (CET)

Brazil	5–2	Sweden
Vavá 9', 32'; Pelé 55', 90'; Zagallo 68'		Liedholm 4'; Simonsson 80'

Råsunda Stadium, Solna
Attendance: 49,737
Referee: Maurice Guigue (France)

Brazil	Sweden

GK	3	Gilmar
RB	4	Djalma Santos
CB	2	Hilderaldo Bellini (c)
CB	15	Orlando
LB	12	Nílton Santos
RH	19	Zito
LH	6	Didi
OR	11	Garrincha
CF	20	Vavá
CF	10	Pelé
OL	7	Mário Zagallo
Manager:
Vicente Feola

GK	1	Kalle Svensson
RB	2	Orvar Bergmark
CH	14	Bengt Gustavsson
LB	3	Sven Axbom
RH	15	Reino Börjesson
LH	6	Sigge Parling
OR	7	Kurt Hamrin
IR	8	Gunnar Gren
CF	9	Agne Simonsson
IL	4	Nils Liedholm (c)
OL	11	Lennart Skoglund
Manager:
(England) George Raynor

Officials

- Linesmen:
  - Albert Dusch (West Germany)
  - Juan Gardeazábal (Spain)
