= Wales at the FIFA World Cup =

International football delegation

The FIFA World Cup is an international association football competition contested by the men's national teams of the members of the Fédération Internationale de Football Association (FIFA), the sport's global governing body. The tournament has been contested every four years since 1930, except in 1942 and 1946, due to the Second World War.

The Wales national football team have entered every World Cup since 1950, but to date have only qualified for two finals tournaments: in 1958 and 2022. In 1958, they reached the quarter-finals before being eliminated by eventual winners Brazil. In 2022, they finished bottom of Group B behind England, the United States, and Iran.

== History ==
=== Before 1950 ===
During the preparations for the 1928 Olympic Football Tournament, FIFA ruled that all its member associations must provide "broken time" payments to cover the expenses of players from their country who participated. In response to what they considered to be unacceptable interference, the football associations of Wales, England, Ireland and Scotland held a meeting at which they agreed to resign from FIFA. As a result, Wales did not compete in the three interwar World Cup competitions. The Football Association of Wales did not rejoin FIFA as a permanent member until 1946.

=== Brazil 1950 ===
The 1949–50 British Home Championship was used as the qualifying group for the four British teams ahead of the 1950 FIFA World Cup, with the top two qualifying for the finals in Brazil. Defeats in their first two matches against England (4–1 at home) and Scotland (2–0 away) meant Wales were no longer able to qualify regardless of the result in their final game against Ireland (IFA). Despite finishing in second place and thus qualifying for the finals, Scotland declined to travel to Brazil, but instead of retaining two British qualifiers and inviting either Wales or Ireland to replace the Scots, FIFA invited France, Portugal and the other Ireland team to participate. Only France accepted, but they ultimately also pulled out.

=== Switzerland 1954 ===
As in 1950, the 1953–54 British Home Championship was used to determine which British nations would qualify for the 1954 FIFA World Cup in Switzerland. In their three matches, Wales managed just one point, with a 3–3 draw in Scotland sandwiched between home defeats to England (4–1) and Northern Ireland (2–1), leaving them bottom of the table. Wales' five goals in qualifying were scored by just two players: John Charles (3) and Ivor Allchurch (2).

=== Sweden 1958 ===
The qualification process for the 1958 FIFA World Cup saw FIFA split up the Home Nations for the first time, with Wales drawn into Group 4 with Czechoslovakia and East Germany. Their qualifying campaign started off well, with a goal from Roy Vernon proving the difference in a 1–0 win over Czechoslovakia in Cardiff, but a 2–1 loss to East Germany in Leipzig and a 2–0 defeat to Czechoslovakia left Wales bottom of the group going into the final match at home to East Germany on 25 September 1957. Goals from Des Palmer and Cliff Jones gave Wales a 3–0 lead going into half-time; Manfred Kaiser pulled one back for the East Germans, but it proved to be too great a margin to overcome, and Palmer completed his hat-trick to give Wales a 4–1 win and put them level on points with Czechoslovakia at the top of the group. A win for East Germany over Czechoslovakia by the right scoreline the following month would see Wales qualify as group winners for their first World Cup. In the end, Czechoslovakia beat East Germany by the same scoreline as Wales had (4–1), consigning Wales to second place in the group and ending their World Cup qualifying journey.

However, elsewhere in qualifying, Israel had reached the final round of qualifying without playing a single match as a result of their opponents pulling out for various political reasons. FIFA ruled that no team other than the hosts and holders could qualify without playing any matches, so they ordered a qualification play-off against one of the second-placed European teams. Belgium were drawn first, but refused to participate; Wales were the next team drawn, and so a two-legged play-off was scheduled for early 1958. Wales won each leg 2–0, giving them a 4–0 aggregate win. Wales' manager at the time was Manchester United assistant manager Jimmy Murphy; the second leg of the Israel play-off was scheduled for the same day as Manchester United's European Cup quarter-final against Red Star Belgrade, which Murphy missed to lead his country, a decision that might have saved his life – the Manchester United plane crashed in Munich on the return journey from Belgrade in an incident that killed 23 people, including eight Manchester United players and three members of the club's staff.

At the finals tournament, Wales were drawn in Group 3 along with 1954 finalists Hungary, Mexico and hosts Sweden. Wales began with a 1–1 draw with Hungary, John Charles scoring a 27th-minute equaliser after József Bozsik had given the Magyars the lead in the fifth minute. Ivor Allchurch then gave Wales the lead after half an hour of their second game against Mexico, only for Jaime Belmonte to equalise with a minute left to play. That result left Wales in second place in the group after two matches, but their final match was against leaders Sweden. The two final matches were not played simultaneously, with Wales and Sweden kicking off five hours earlier than Hungary and Mexico, which allowed Wales to stake an early claim to a place in the quarter-finals; they held the hosts to a 0–0 draw, the first time Sweden had been shut out at home in almost a year. Because of the tie-breaking criteria in use at the tournament, that result meant that, regardless of the margin of victory, the best Hungary and Mexico could manage would be to force a play-off against Wales for a place in the quarter-finals – a draw would see them both eliminated. Hungary won the match 4–0, and the play-off was scheduled for two days later in Solna.

Hungary took the lead through Lajos Tichy after 33 minutes and held the lead until half-time. Ten minutes after the break, Ivor Allchurch scored the equaliser, before Terry Medwin scored the winner with just under a quarter of an hour left to play. The result meant Wales qualified for the quarter-finals, where they would play against the winners of Group 4, Brazil. Having impressed in Brazil's last group match against the Soviet Union, a 17-year-old Pelé again started against Wales; however, it took almost three-quarters of the match for Brazil to break through the Welsh defence, as Pelé's flick took him past Mel Charles and he toe-poked home the only goal of the game. Pelé went on to score a further five goals in the tournament, including a hat-trick in the 5–2 win over France in the semi-finals, and two more in another 5–2 win over Sweden in the final as Brazil won the tournament for the first time.

Group 3

| Team | Pld | W | D | L | GF | GA | GAv | Pts |
|---|---|---|---|---|---|---|---|---|
| Sweden | 3 | 2 | 1 | 0 | 5 | 1 | 5.00 | 5 |
| Wales | 3 | 0 | 3 | 0 | 2 | 2 | 1.00 | 3 |
| Hungary | 3 | 1 | 1 | 1 | 6 | 3 | 2.00 | 3 |
| Mexico | 3 | 0 | 1 | 2 | 1 | 8 | 0.13 | 1 |

| 8 June 1958 Group 3 | Hungary | 1–1 | Wales | Sandviken |
| 19:00 (CET) | Bozsik 5' | Report | J. Charles 27' | Stadium: Jernvallen; Attendance: 20,000; Referee: José María Codesal (Uruguay) |

| 11 June 1958 Group 3 | Mexico | 1–1 | Wales | Solna |
| 19:00 (CET) | Belmonte 89' | Report | I. Allchurch 32' | Stadium: Råsunda Stadium; Attendance: 25,000; Referee: Leo Lemešić (Yugoslavia) |

| 15 June 1958 Group 3 | Sweden | 0–0 | Wales | Solna |
| 14:00 (CET) | | Report | | Stadium: Råsunda Stadium; Attendance: 35,000; Referee: Lucien Van Nuffel (Belgium) |

Play-off

| 17 June 1958 Group 3 play-off | Wales | 2–1 | Hungary | Solna |
| 19:00 (CET) | I. Allchurch 55'; Medwin 76' | Report | Tichy 33' | Stadium: Råsunda Stadium; Attendance: 20,000; Referee: Nikolay Latyshev (Soviet Union) |

Quarter-finals

| 19 June 1958 Quarter-finals | Brazil | 1–0 | Wales | Gothenburg |
| 19:00 (CET) | Pelé 66' | Report | | Stadium: Ullevi; Attendance: 25,000; Referee: Friedrich Seipelt (Austria) |

=== Chile 1962 ===
In qualifying for the 1962 FIFA World Cup in Chile, Wales were drawn into Group 9 with Austria, Denmark and Spain. The group was split into two rounds, with Wales and Austria – as the two nations that had qualified for the 1958 World Cup – receiving a bye to the second round. Denmark withdrew from the qualifying process before any matches were played, so Spain advanced automatically. Austria then also withdrew, leaving Wales and Spain to play off over two legs to determine who would advance. The first leg in Cardiff on 19 April 1961 saw Wales take an early lead through Phil Woosnam after seven minutes, only for Alfonso Rodríguez Salas to level the scores midway through the first half, before Alfredo Di Stéfano scored the winner for Spain with 12 minutes left. The return leg was played in Madrid a month later with Wales needing to win by a two-goal margin to surpass Spain. After a goalless first half, Joaquín Peiró opened the scoring in the 55th minute; Ivor Allchurch scored one of the three goals Wales now required, but they were unable to find the other two and were eliminated.

=== England 1966 ===
The 1966 FIFA World Cup was played in England and featured 16 teams. Qualifying saw 32 nations compete for the nine UEFA spots at the finals, in addition to host nation England. Wales were drawn into Group 7 with the Soviet Union, Greece and, for the second time in a row, Denmark. This time, Denmark did not withdraw and beat Wales in the group's opening match in Copenhagen in October 1964, thanks to Ole Madsen scoring the only goal of the game. Mimis Papaioannou and Andreas Papaemmanouil gave Greece a 2–0 win in Wales' next game in December. Papaioannou was on the scoresheet again in the two sides' meeting in Cardiff in March 1965, but it proved to be mere consolation as a brace from Ivor Allchurch and further goals from Mike England and Roy Vernon gave Wales a 4–1 win; however, defeat to the Soviet Union in Moscow in May, thanks to a goal from Valentin Ivanov and an own goal by Graham Williams, meant Wales' hopes of qualification were now out of their hands. The Soviet Union won their next three games, scoring 13 goals in the process and ending Wales' campaign, but the return fixture between the two sides in October 1965 saw Wales come out on top in Cardiff; Anatoliy Banishevskiy opened the scoring for the Soviet Union, but Vernon equalised three minutes later, before Ivor Allchurch scored the winner with 13 minutes to go. Wales played their final qualifier at home to Denmark in Wrexham in December 1965, and a 4–2 win thanks to goals from Wyn Davies, Roy Vernon (2) and Ronnie Rees, meant they finished second in the group, four points behind the Soviet Union.

=== Mexico 1970 ===
The 1970 FIFA World Cup in Mexico featured 16 teams, of which nine were UEFA nations; eight who went through qualifying plus holders England. The 29 European teams that entered were divided into eight groups (five of four teams, three of three), with the winners of each group qualifying for the finals. Wales were drawn into Group 3 with Italy and East Germany, but lost all four of their matches and finished bottom of the group, their worst performance in qualifying for a major tournament to date.

=== West Germany 1974 ===
The 1974 FIFA World Cup also featured 16 teams in the finals, with the UEFA qualification process offering eight guaranteed places (in addition to host nation West Germany), plus a further spot for the winners of an inter-continental play-off against a team from South America. The 32 UEFA nations were divided into nine groups (five of four teams, four of three), with the winners of groups 1–8 qualifying automatically for the finals and the winners of group 9 advancing to the play-off. Wales were drawn into Group 5 along with England and Poland. They managed just one point in their first two matches against England (a 1–0 defeat at home and a 1–1 draw away), but goals from Leighton James and Trevor Hockey gave Wales a 2–0 win at home to Poland in their third match. Poland's 2–0 win over England meant that victory for Wales away to Poland would put them top of the group with only England's home meeting with Poland left to play; however, Poland won the match 3–0, which meant Wales finished their qualifying campaign bottom of the group after Poland and England played out a 1–1 draw on the final day.

=== Argentina 1978 ===
The 1978 FIFA World Cup followed the same format as four years earlier, with eight of the 16 finals places guaranteed for UEFA teams, plus one more for the winner of an inter-continental play-off, in addition to the World Cup holders West Germany. The 31 UEFA entrants were again divided into nine groups (four of four teams and five of three), and Wales were drawn into Group 7 with Czechoslovakia and Scotland. Despite a 1–0 away loss to Scotland in their opening game in November 1976, Wales managed a 3–0 win at home to Czechoslovakia in March 1977, with goals from Leighton James (2) and Nick Deacy rekindling their hopes of qualification. A win for Wales in their next game at home to Scotland in October 1977 would have put them on the verge of qualification with only Czechoslovakia left to play. The game was originally scheduled for Cardiff's Ninian Park, but new legislation meant the local council would only provide a safety certificate for a maximum attendance of 14,050, despite the FAW's offer to fund improvements to the ground if the council would increase the limit to 25,000. That offer was rejected and similar issues prevented the game from being played at the Racecourse Ground in Wrexham, so the FAW selected Anfield in Liverpool to host the match; however, despite its proximity to Wales, the move also made the game more accessible for Scotland fans, who travelled down in their thousands.

With the game at 0–0 with just under a quarter of an hour left to play, Joe Jordan and David Jones challenged for a long throw-in from Asa Hartford in the Wales penalty area. Both players' hands went up and the ball struck one of them, resulting in referee Robert Wurtz awarding Scotland a penalty, despite the protests of Wales goalkeeper Dai Davies; replays showed the ball had in fact struck Jordan's hand rather than Jones's, discernible by the fact that Jordan was wearing a long-sleeved blue shirt and Jones was wearing short sleeves. Nevertheless, the decision had been made and Don Masson stepped up to take the penalty; he sent Davies the wrong way to make the score 1–0. A second goal from Kenny Dalglish gave Scotland a 2–0 win, sending them to the World Cup. Wales could now only finish as runners-up with a win away to Czechoslovakia a month later. That match, though, also finished in defeat, Zdeněk Nehoda scoring the only goal for the hosts.

=== Spain 1982 ===
The 1982 FIFA World Cup was the first to feature 24 teams at the finals, of which 13 would qualify from UEFA, in addition to host nation Spain. The 33 participating teams were split into five pots and drawn into seven groups (six of five teams, one of three), with the top two from each of the five-team groups and the winner of the three-team group qualifying for the finals. Wales were seeded in Pot C and drawn into Group 3 along with Czechoslovakia, the Soviet Union, Turkey and Iceland. Wales opened their qualifying campaign with consecutive 4–0 wins (away to Iceland and at home to Turkey), followed by two more 1–0 wins (at home to Czechoslovakia and away to Turkey), before dropping their first points in a goalless draw at home to the Soviet Union in May 1981. They followed this up with a 2–0 loss away to Czechoslovakia, though a victory in their next game at home to Iceland, who had held Czechoslovakia to a 1–1 draw in Reykjavík, would have put Wales on the verge of qualification, with Czechoslovakia yet to play either of their matches against the Soviet Union. Robbie James put Wales 1–0 up 25 minutes into the game against Iceland, but Ásgeir Sigurvinsson equalised just after half-time; Alan Curtis then restored Wales' lead seven minutes later, only for Ásgeir to level the scores again just after the hour mark. The match finished 2–2, which meant Wales, expecting to lose to the Soviet Union, would need results to go their way in the matches between the Soviet Union and Czechoslovakia in order to qualify. The Soviet Union beat Czechoslovakia and then Wales in Tbilisi, and another win over Czechoslovakia in Bratislava would send Wales to the World Cup. Oleg Blokhin opened the scoring for the Soviet Union with less than 15 minutes played, only for Rostislav Vojáček to equalise 20 minutes later; it proved to be the last goal of the game, and the draw was enough for Czechoslovakia to overtake Wales in the group and qualify for the finals.

=== Mexico 1986 ===
For the 1986 FIFA World Cup in Mexico, the 32 participating UEFA nations (excluding holders Italy) were drawn into seven qualifying groups (four of five teams, three of four), with the winners of all seven groups and the runners-up from the five-team groups qualifying directly for the World Cup; the runners-up from Groups 1 and 5 would then contest a play-off for a 12th spot, and the runners-up from Group 7 would play against the winners of the OFC qualifying process for the last place at the World Cup. Wales was seeded in Pot C and drawn into Group 7 along with Spain, Scotland and, for the second time in a row, Iceland. Wales' qualifying campaign got off to a bad start, suffering consecutive away defeats to Iceland (1–0) and Spain (3–0), but they recovered with a 2–1 home win over Iceland, then a 1–0 win over Scotland at Hampden Park, followed by a surprise 3–0 win at home to Spain that featured two goals from Ian Rush and a memorable goal by Mark Hughes. That left Wales needing a win at home to Scotland in September 1985 to secure qualification; any other result would see them eliminated unless Spain failed to better Wales' result in their match against Iceland two weeks later. Hughes opened the scoring for Wales, but a penalty for Scotland, scored by Davie Cooper, gave them a 1–1 draw. Spain's 2–1 victory over Iceland meant they overtook both Wales and Scotland to qualify for the World Cup; Scotland and Wales finished level on points, but with Scotland having the advantage on goal difference.

=== Italy 1990 ===
The 1990 FIFA World Cup saw 32 UEFA nations (excluding host nation Italy) compete in qualifying for 13 places at the finals. The teams were placed in five seeding pots before being drawn into seven groups (four of five teams, three of four). The winners of each group plus the runners-up from the five-team groups and the two best runners-up from the four-team groups would qualify for the finals. Wales were seeded in pot C and drawn into Group 4 with West Germany, the Netherlands and Finland. Wales managed just two points in qualifying; after a 1–0 defeat away to the Netherlands in their opening game, they drew 2–2 with Finland and then 0–0 with West Germany, both at home. They then lost all three of the return matches, going down 1–0 away to Finland, 2–1 at home to the Netherlands and 2–1 away to West Germany on the final day. That loss to Finland meant Wales finished bottom of the group.

=== United States 1994 ===
A record 37 teams from the UEFA zone participated in qualification for the 1994 FIFA World Cup. Divided into six seeding pots, the teams were then drawn into six groups (five of six teams, one of seven), although the FR Yugoslavia team was suspended following the draw due to the Yugoslav Wars, leaving Group 5 with only five teams. The top two teams from each group would qualify for the finals, joining holders Germany. Wales were seeded in Pot 4 and drawn into Group 4 along with Belgium, Czechoslovakia (known as the Representation of Czechs and Slovaks or RCS following the breakup of Czechoslovakia at the end of 1992), Romania, Cyprus and the Faroe Islands. Despite losing 5–1 in their opening game away to Romania, Wales bounced back with consecutive wins at home to the Faroe Islands (6–0) and away to Cyprus (1–0), before another defeat away to Belgium (2–0). That scoreline was reversed in the two's next meeting, sparking a run of five straight matches unbeaten, including wins away to the Faroe Islands (3–0) and at home to Cyprus (2–0), and draws home and away against the RCS. That meant Wales were still in contention going into their final match at home to Romania, though they needed to win and hope the RCS did not beat Belgium in the other game in Brussels. Romania took the lead just after the half-hour mark, but Dean Saunders equalised for Wales on the hour. Two minutes later, Gary Speed was fouled by Dan Petrescu in the Romania penalty area, and referee Kurt Röthlisberger pointed to the spot. Left-back Paul Bodin stepped up to take the kick having scored each of his last three penalties for Wales; however, his powerful kick hit the crossbar and stayed out. With seven minutes to go, Florin Raducioiu scored the winning goal for Romania. With Belgium and the RCS playing out a goalless draw in Brussels, had Bodin's penalty gone in and Wales hung on, they would have qualified for the World Cup; instead, they finished fourth in the group, three points behind qualifiers Romania and Belgium.

=== France 1998 ===
The 1998 FIFA World Cup was the first to feature 32 teams in the finals, but following the break-up of the Soviet Union, Yugoslavia and Czechoslovakia, another record of 49 UEFA nations (excluding host nation France) entered qualifying, playing for 14 places in the finals. The teams were seeded into five pots and drawn into nine groups (four of six teams and five of five); the winners of each group and the best runner-up would qualify automatically, with the remaining eight runners-up going into a play-off for the final four spots. Wales were seeded in Pot 4 and drawn into Group 7 with the Netherlands, Belgium, Turkey and San Marino. Wales managed just two wins in qualifying, both against San Marino in their first two matches, winning 5–0 away and 6–0 at home; however, this was followed by back-to-back defeats to the Netherlands (3–1 at home and 7–1 away), before their only other point of the campaign: a goalless draw at home to Turkey. In their last three games, Wales lost 2–1 at home to Belgium, 6–4 away to Turkey and 3–2 away to Belgium, leaving them in fourth place out of the five teams.

=== South Korea/Japan 2002 ===
The 2002 FIFA World Cup featured two host nations for the first time in the tournament's history, with South Korea and Japan welcoming the 30 other nations who reached the finals. In addition to defending champions France, UEFA was allocated 13 guaranteed spots at the tournament, with another potentially going to the winner of a play-off against a team from the Asian Football Confederation (AFC). The 50 UEFA nations were again seeded into five pots and drawn into nine groups (five of six teams and four of five); the group winners would qualify automatically and eight of the runners-up would go into the UEFA play-offs, while the runner-up from a group drawn randomly before the main draw (Group 2) would go into the AFC play-off. Wales were again seeded in Pot 4 and drawn into Group 5 along with Norway, Ukraine, Poland, Belarus and Armenia. After an opening 2–1 defeat away to Belarus, Wales then recorded six draws in their next seven matches, the other result being a 2–1 defeat at home to Poland. They then lost their penultimate match 3–2 away to Norway, leaving them one last chance to avoid a second winless World Cup qualifying campaign since 1970. In their final fixture, Wales beat Belarus 1–0 at the Millennium Stadium, ending a run of 13 matches without a win and preventing Belarus from reaching the play-offs.

=== Germany 2006 ===
Qualification for the 2006 FIFA World Cup saw 51 UEFA nations compete for 13 places at the finals, in addition to host nation Germany. The teams were seeded into seven pots and drawn into eight groups (three of seven teams, five of six), with the winners of each group and the two best runners-up qualifying automatically for the tournament, and the remaining runners-up contesting a play-off for the last three spots. Wales were seeded in Pot D and drawn into Group 6 along with England, Poland, Austria, Northern Ireland and Azerbaijan. Wales began their qualifying campaign with consecutive draws away to Azerbaijan (1–1) and at home to Northern Ireland (2–2), before losing their next six matches in a row. First was a 2–0 defeat away to England in the sides' first meeting in 20 years, followed by a 3–2 home loss to Poland in Mark Hughes' last game as manager and Gary Speed's last as captain. Wales opened 2005 with home and away defeats to Austria (2–0 at home and 1–0 away), before losing the return games against England (1–0 at home) and Poland (1–0 away). They then picked up their first victory of the campaign, winning 3–2 away to Northern Ireland; after taking a 2–0 lead in the first half, Northern Ireland pulled it back to 2–2 within five minutes after the interval, before Ryan Giggs scored the winner with less than 10 minutes to play. Giggs was on the scoresheet again in the final game, scoring both goals as Wales beat Azerbaijan 2–0 at home to confirm fifth place in the group.

=== South Africa 2010 ===
The 2010 FIFA World Cup followed the same format as the last three, with 32 teams at the finals, 13 of which came through UEFA's qualifying process. The 53 participating teams were seeded into six pots and drawn into nine groups (eight of six teams and one of five), with the winners of each group qualifying automatically and the eight best runners-up contesting a play-off for the four remaining places. Wales were seeded in Pot 4 and drawn into Group 4 along with Germany, Russia, Finland, Liechtenstein and Azerbaijan. After playing them in their most recent World Cup qualifier almost three years earlier, Wales won their first match of this campaign 1–0 at home to Azerbaijan. They alternated between victory and defeat in their first four games, losing their next game 2–1 away to Russia, before a 2–0 home win over Liechtenstein and then a 1–0 defeat away to Germany in their last competitive game of 2008. They started 2009 with another two defeats, at home to Finland and Germany in March and April, before their third straight win over Azerbaijan in June. A 3–1 loss at home to Russia ended Wales' already slim hopes of qualification, while defeat to Finland a month later meant Wales could finish the group no higher than fourth. That position was confirmed with a 2–0 away win over Liechtenstein on the final matchday.

=== Brazil 2014 ===
The qualifying process for the 2014 FIFA World Cup again saw 53 UEFA nations compete for 13 places at the finals in Brazil. The teams were seeded into six pots and drawn into nine groups (eight of six teams, one of five), with the winners of each group qualifying automatically and the eight best runners-up going into a play-off for the last four spots. Wales and the Faroe Islands were equal in the FIFA World Ranking used to seed the teams, but the Faroe Islands were successful in their appeal to increase the decimal accuracy of the rankings, which saw them overtake Wales and escape the bottom seeding pot at Wales' expense. Wales were drawn into Group A along with Croatia, Serbia, Belgium, Scotland and Macedonia. They suffered back-to-back defeats in their first two games at home to Belgium (2–0) and away to Serbia (6–1), before coming from behind with two late goals from Gareth Bale to beat Scotland 2–1 in October 2012. Wales finished the year with a defeat to Croatia, before claiming their second win over Scotland in their first competitive game of 2013. A second loss to Croatia came four days later, followed by a 2–1 away defeat to Macedonia and a 3–0 home loss to Serbia that saw them drop to the bottom of the group. Wales moved ahead of Macedonia and Scotland with a 1–0 win over the former in October 2013, only to slip back to fifth place behind the latter following a 1–1 draw with already-qualified Belgium in their final game.

=== Russia 2018 ===
Wales' successful qualification for UEFA Euro 2016 and subsequent rise up the FIFA World Ranking saw them seeded in the first of six pots in qualifying for the 2018 FIFA World Cup, along with Germany, Belgium, Netherlands, Portugal, Romania, England, Spain and Croatia. The 52 nations were drawn into nine groups (seven of six teams, two of five), though with the later addition of Gibraltar and Kosovo, every group ended up with six teams each. The winners of each group would qualify for the finals, while the eight best runners-up would go into a play-off for the four remaining UEFA spots. Wales were drawn into Group D with Austria, Serbia, the Republic of Ireland, Moldova and Georgia. Wales' qualification campaign began well, with a 4–0 home win over Moldova; however, five consecutive draws, four of which came after Wales held a lead, left them in third place behind Serbia and Ireland. Three straight wins then followed – at home to Austria (1–0), and away to Moldova (2–0) and Georgia (1–0) – putting Wales in second place, a point behind Serbia with a game to play. A draw against Ireland would guarantee Wales at least a play-off spot, and potentially automatic qualification if Serbia lost to Georgia by at least two goals, while a win would leave Serbia also requiring victory to claim top spot. Serbia ultimately won their match to leave Wales and Ireland battling for the play-off spot, which Ireland claimed thanks to a single goal from James McClean.

=== Qatar 2022 ===
In qualifying for the 2022 FIFA World Cup, Wales were drawn in UEFA Group E along with Belgium, the Czech Republic, Belarus and Estonia. After losing 3–1 away to Belgium in their opening game in March 2021, Wales went unbeaten in their remaining seven matches to finish second in the group ahead of the Czech Republic and qualify for the play-offs as one of the six seeds. Drawn in a play-off path against Austria and then the winners of the semi-final between Scotland and Ukraine, Wales beat Austria 2–1 in March 2022, but were made to wait until June for the final, after the match between Scotland and Ukraine was postponed due to the 2022 Russian invasion of Ukraine. Ukraine beat Scotland 3–1 at Hampden Park to qualify for the final in Cardiff, where a Gareth Bale free kick was diverted into his own net by Ukraine captain Andriy Yarmolenko to give Wales a 1–0 win and send them to the World Cup for the first time in 64 years.

The draw for the finals took place before Wales' play-off path was concluded, which meant despite Wales being ranked 18th in the FIFA World Ranking at the time, which should have put them in Pot 3, they were placed in the bottom of the four pots for the draw. Wales were drawn into Group B along with England (with whom they had shared a group at UEFA Euro 2016), Iran and the United States. Wales announced their 26-man squad for the tournament on 9 November 2022. Wales drew their first fixture against the United States on 21 November 2022; after Timothy Weah opened the scoring for the United States, Wales captain Gareth Bale won a penalty that he converted himself in the 82nd minute. Against Iran four days later, goalkeeper Wayne Hennessey committed a reckless challenge on Mehdi Taremi; he originally received a yellow card, but it was upgraded to a red after a VAR review. Iran went on to score twice in injury time, giving Wales a 2–0 defeat. That meant Wales needed a win in their final group match against England on 29 November. Although they managed to keep the score goalless in the first half, a direct free-kick from Marcus Rashford and a goal from Phil Foden in the space of two minutes all but confirmed Wales' elimination, and a second goal from Rashford completed a 3–0 defeat.

Squad

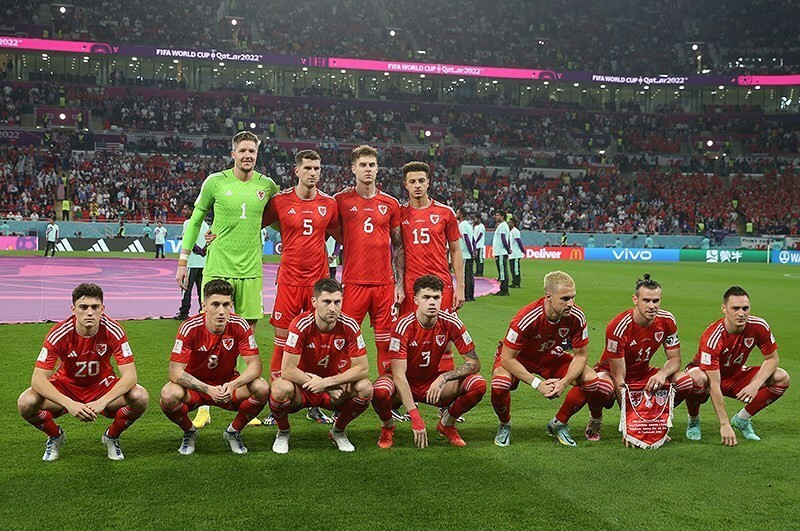
Wales starting XI for their first group match at the 2022 FIFA World Cup

The Wales squad for the 2022 FIFA World Cup in Qatar.

| No. | Pos. | Player | Date of birth (age) | Caps | Goals | Club |
|---|---|---|---|---|---|---|
| 1 | GK | Wayne Hennessey | 24 January 1987 (aged 35) | 106 | 0 | (The Football Association) Nottingham Forest |
| 2 | DF | Chris Gunter | 21 July 1989 (aged 33) | 109 | 0 | (The Football Association) AFC Wimbledon |
| 3 | DF | Neco Williams | 13 April 2001 (aged 21) | 23 | 2 | (The Football Association) Nottingham Forest |
| 4 | DF | Ben Davies | 24 April 1993 (aged 29) | 74 | 1 | (The Football Association) Tottenham Hotspur |
| 5 | DF | Chris Mepham | 5 November 1997 (aged 25) | 33 | 0 | (The Football Association) Bournemouth |
| 6 | DF | Joe Rodon | 22 October 1997 (aged 25) | 30 | 0 | (French Football Federation) Rennes |
| 7 | MF | Joe Allen | 14 March 1990 (aged 32) | 72 | 2 | (Football Association of Wales) Swansea City |
| 8 | MF | Harry Wilson | 22 March 1997 (aged 25) | 39 | 5 | (The Football Association) Fulham |
| 9 | FW | Brennan Johnson | 23 May 2001 (aged 21) | 15 | 2 | (The Football Association) Nottingham Forest |
| 10 | MF | Aaron Ramsey | 26 December 1990 (aged 31) | 75 | 20 | (French Football Federation) Nice |
| 11 | FW | Gareth Bale (captain) | 16 July 1989 (aged 33) | 108 | 40 | (United States Soccer Federation) Los Angeles FC |
| 12 | GK | Danny Ward | 22 June 1993 (aged 29) | 26 | 0 | (The Football Association) Leicester City |
| 13 | FW | Kieffer Moore | 8 August 1992 (aged 30) | 28 | 9 | (The Football Association) Bournemouth |
| 14 | DF | Connor Roberts | 23 September 1995 (aged 27) | 41 | 3 | (The Football Association) Burnley |
| 15 | DF | Ethan Ampadu | 14 September 2000 (aged 22) | 37 | 0 | (Italian Football Federation) Spezia |
| 16 | MF | Joe Morrell | 3 January 1997 (aged 25) | 30 | 0 | (The Football Association) Portsmouth |
| 17 | DF | Tom Lockyer | 3 December 1994 (aged 27) | 14 | 0 | (The Football Association) Luton Town |
| 18 | MF | Jonny Williams | 9 October 1993 (aged 29) | 33 | 2 | (The Football Association) Swindon Town |
| 19 | FW | Mark Harris | 29 December 1998 (aged 23) | 5 | 0 | (Football Association of Wales) Cardiff City |
| 20 | FW | Daniel James | 10 November 1997 (aged 25) | 38 | 5 | (The Football Association) Fulham |
| 21 | GK | Adam Davies | 17 July 1992 (aged 30) | 4 | 0 | (The Football Association) Sheffield United |
| 22 | MF | Sorba Thomas | 25 January 1999 (aged 23) | 6 | 0 | (The Football Association) Huddersfield Town |
| 23 | MF | Dylan Levitt | 17 November 2000 (aged 22) | 13 | 0 | (Scottish Football Association) Dundee United |
| 24 | DF | Ben Cabango | 30 May 2000 (aged 22) | 5 | 0 | (Football Association of Wales) Swansea City |
| 25 | MF | Rubin Colwill | 27 April 2002 (aged 20) | 7 | 1 | (Football Association of Wales) Cardiff City |
| 26 | MF | Matthew Smith | 22 November 1999 (aged 22) | 19 | 0 | (The Football Association) Milton Keynes Dons |

Group B

Matches

21 November 2022
22:00

| United States | 1–1 | Wales |
|---|---|---|
| Weah 36' | Report | Bale 82' (pen.) |

Ahmad bin Ali Stadium, Al Rayyan
Attendance: 43,418
Referee: Abdulrahman Al-Jassim (Qatar)

25 November 2022
13:00

| Wales | 0–2 | Iran |
|---|---|---|
| | Report | Cheshmi 90+8'; Rezaeian 90+11' |

Ahmad bin Ali Stadium, Al Rayyan
Attendance: 40,875
Referee: Mario Escobar (Guatemala)

29 November 2022
22:00

| Wales | 0–3 | England |
|---|---|---|
| | Report | Rashford 50', 68'; Foden 51' |

Ahmad bin Ali Stadium, Al Rayyan
Attendance: 44,297
Referee: Slavko Vinčić (Slovenia)

Standings

| Pos | Team | Pld | W | D | L | GF | GA | GD | Pts | Qualification |
|---|---|---|---|---|---|---|---|---|---|---|
| 1 | England | 3 | 2 | 1 | 0 | 9 | 2 | +7 | 7 | Advanced to knockout stage |
| 2 | United States | 3 | 1 | 2 | 0 | 2 | 1 | +1 | 5 | Advanced to knockout stage |
| 3 | Iran | 3 | 1 | 0 | 2 | 4 | 7 | −3 | 3 | |
| 4 | Wales | 3 | 0 | 1 | 2 | 1 | 6 | −5 | 1 | |

Source: FIFA

=== Canada/Mexico/United States 2026 ===
The 2026 FIFA World Cup will see an increase in the number of teams in the finals from 32 to 48, which means an increase in the number of UEFA representatives at the tournament from 13 to 16. The 54 eligible UEFA member nations were drawn in to 12 groups of either four or five teams; the winners of each group will qualify directly, while the runners-up will enter the play-offs along with the four best teams from the 2024–25 UEFA Nations League who did not finish in the top two of their World Cup qualifying group. Wales were drawn into Group J along with Belgium, North Macedonia, Kazakhstan and Liechtenstein. They opened their campaign with a 3–1 home win over Kazakhstan in March 2025, with goals from Daniel James, Ben Davies and Rabbi Matondo, before a 96th-minute equaliser from David Brooks salvaged a 1–1 draw against North Macedonia three days later. Wales will host Liechtenstein before travelling to Belgium in June 2025, followed by the return fixture against Kazakhstan in September. After two bye weeks leading into their home clash with Belgium at the end of the October window, the campaign will culminate with a trip to Liechtenstein and a home game against North Macedonia in November 2025.

== Record at the FIFA World Cup ==
=== Overall record ===
| FIFA World Cup record | | | | | | | | | FIFA World Cup qualification record | | | | | | FIFA World Cup qualification play-offs record | | | | | |
| Year | Result | Position | Pld | W | D | L | GF | GA | Pld | W | D | L | GF | GA | Pld | W | D | L | GF | GA |
|---|---|---|---|---|---|---|---|---|---|---|---|---|---|---|---|---|---|---|---|---|
| (Uruguay) 1930 | Not a FIFA member | | | | | | | | Not a FIFA member | | | | | | | | | | | |
| (Italy) 1934 | Not a FIFA member | | | | | | | | Not a FIFA member | | | | | | | | | | | |
| (France) 1938 | Not a FIFA member | | | | | | | | Not a FIFA member | | | | | | | | | | | |
| (Brazil) 1950 | Did not qualify | | | | | | | | 3 | 0 | 1 | 2 | 1 | 6 | | | | | | |
| (Switzerland) 1954 | Did not qualify | | | | | | | | 3 | 0 | 1 | 2 | 5 | 9 | | | | | | |
| (Sweden) 1958 | Quarter-finals | 5th | 5 | 1 | 3 | 1 | 4 | 4 | 6 | 4 | 0 | 2 | 10 | 5 | 2 | 2 | 0 | 0 | 4 | 0 |
| (Chile) 1962 | Did not qualify | | | | | | | | 2 | 0 | 1 | 1 | 2 | 3 | | | | | | |
| (England) 1966 | Did not qualify | | | | | | | | 6 | 3 | 0 | 3 | 11 | 9 | | | | | | |
| (Mexico) 1970 | Did not qualify | | | | | | | | 4 | 0 | 0 | 4 | 3 | 10 | | | | | | |
| (West Germany) 1974 | Did not qualify | | | | | | | | 4 | 1 | 1 | 2 | 3 | 5 | | | | | | |
| (Argentina) 1978 | Did not qualify | | | | | | | | 4 | 1 | 0 | 3 | 3 | 4 | | | | | | |
| (Spain) 1982 | Did not qualify | | | | | | | | 8 | 4 | 2 | 2 | 12 | 7 | | | | | | |
| (Mexico) 1986 | Did not qualify | | | | | | | | 6 | 3 | 1 | 2 | 7 | 6 | | | | | | |
| (Italy) 1990 | Did not qualify | | | | | | | | 6 | 0 | 2 | 4 | 4 | 8 | | | | | | |
| (United States) 1994 | Did not qualify | | | | | | | | 10 | 5 | 2 | 3 | 19 | 12 | | | | | | |
| (France) 1998 | Did not qualify | | | | | | | | 8 | 2 | 1 | 5 | 20 | 21 | | | | | | |
| (South Korea) (Japan) 2002 | Did not qualify | | | | | | | | 10 | 1 | 6 | 3 | 10 | 12 | | | | | | |
| (Germany) 2006 | Did not qualify | | | | | | | | 10 | 2 | 2 | 6 | 10 | 15 | | | | | | |
| (South Africa) 2010 | Did not qualify | | | | | | | | 10 | 4 | 0 | 6 | 9 | 12 | | | | | | |
| (Brazil) 2014 | Did not qualify | | | | | | | | 10 | 3 | 1 | 6 | 9 | 20 | | | | | | |
| (Russia) 2018 | Did not qualify | | | | | | | | 10 | 4 | 5 | 1 | 13 | 6 | | | | | | |
| (Qatar) 2022 | Group stage | 30th | 3 | 0 | 1 | 2 | 1 | 6 | 10 | 6 | 3 | 1 | 17 | 10 | 2 | 2 | 0 | 0 | 3 | 1 |
| (Canada) (Mexico) (United States) 2026 | Did not qualify | | | | | | | | 8 | 5 | 1 | 2 | 21 | 11 | 1 | 0 | 1 | 0 | 1 | 1 |
| (Morocco) (Portugal) (Spain) 2030 | To be determined | | | | | | | | To be determined | | | | | | | | | | | |
| (Saudi Arabia) 2034 | To be determined | | | | | | | | To be determined | | | | | | | | | | | |
| Totals | Quarter-finals | 2/25 | 8 | 1 | 4 | 3 | 5 | 10 | 138 | 48 | 30 | 60 | 189 | 191 | 5 | 4 | 1 | 0 | 8 | 2 |

*Draws include knockout matches decided via penalty shoot-out

=== By match ===
| World Cup | Round | Opponent | Score | Result | Venue | Wales scorers |
|---|---|---|---|---|---|---|
| 1958 | Group 3 | Hungary | 1–1 | D | Sandviken | J. Charles |
| 1958 | Group 3 | Mexico | 1–1 | D | Solna | I. Allchurch |
| 1958 | Group 3 | Sweden | 0–0 | D | Solna | — |
| 1958 | Group 3 | Hungary | 2–1 | W | Solna | I. Allchurch, Medwin |
| 1958 | Quarter-finals | Brazil | 0–1 | L | Gothenburg | — |
| 2022 | Group B | United States | 1–1 | D | Al Rayyan | Bale |
| 2022 | Group B | Iran | 0–2 | L | Al Rayyan | — |
| 2022 | Group B | England | 0–3 | L | Al Rayyan | — |

=== Record by opponent ===
FIFA World Cup matches (by team)
| Opponent | Games played | Wins | Draws | Losses | Total | Goals for | Goals against |
|---|---|---|---|---|---|---|---|
| Brazil | 1 | 0 | 0 | 1 | 1 | 0 | 1 |
| England | 1 | 0 | 0 | 1 | 1 | 0 | 3 |
| Hungary | 2 | 1 | 1 | 0 | 2 | 3 | 2 |
| Iran | 1 | 0 | 0 | 1 | 1 | 0 | 2 |
| Mexico | 1 | 0 | 1 | 0 | 1 | 1 | 1 |
| Sweden | 1 | 0 | 1 | 0 | 1 | 0 | 0 |
| United States | 1 | 0 | 1 | 0 | 1 | 1 | 1 |

== Statistics ==
=== Most appearances ===
Seven players appeared in all five of Wales' matches at the 1958 World Cup. One of them was Mel Charles, whose older brother John also played four matches in the tournament.

| Rank | Player | Matches | World Cups |
|---|---|---|---|
| 1 | Ivor Allchurch | 5 | 1958 |
| 1 | Dave Bowen | 5 | 1958 |
| 1 | Mel Charles | 5 | 1958 |
| 1 | Mel Hopkins | 5 | 1958 |
| 1 | Cliff Jones | 5 | 1958 |
| 1 | Jack Kelsey | 5 | 1958 |
| 1 | Stuart Williams | 5 | 1958 |
| 8 | John Charles | 4 | 1958 |
| 8 | Terry Medwin | 4 | 1958 |
| 8 | Derrick Sullivan | 4 | 1958 |

=== Goalscorers ===
On June 8th 1958, John Charles made history by scoring Wale's first-ever FIFA World Cup goal. It happened on their opening match against Hungary in Sandviken.

| Rank | Player | Goals | World Cups |
|---|---|---|---|
| 1 | Ivor Allchurch | 2 | 1958 |
| 2 | John Charles | 1 | 1958 |
| 2 | Terry Medwin | 1 | 1958 |
| 2 | Gareth Bale | 1 | 2022 |

=== Wales goals by tournament ===
| World Cup | Goalscorer(s) |
|---|---|
| 1958 | Ivor Allchurch (2), John Charles, Terry Medwin |
| 2022 | Gareth Bale |

== See also ==
- Wales at the UEFA European Championship
