= László Sárosi =

László Sárosi may refer to:

- László Sárosi (footballer) (1932–2016), Hungarian football player and coach
- László Sárosi (water polo) (born 1946), Hungarian former water polo player
