= Vasas SC in European football =

Vasas Sport Club is a professional football club based in Budapest, Hungary.

== Matches ==
Season	Competition	Round	Club	Home	Away	Aggregate
1957–58	European Cup	Preliminary round	(Bulgaria) CDNA Sofia	6–1	1–2	7–3
		First round	(Switzerland) BSC Young Boys	2–1	1–1	3–2
		Quarter-finals	(Netherlands) Ajax	4–0	2–2	6–2
		Semi-finals	(Spain) Real Madrid	2–0	0–4	2–4
1961–62	European Cup	Preliminary round	(Spain) Real Madrid	0–2	1–3	1–5
1962–63	European Cup	Preliminary round	(Norway) Fredrikstad	7–0	4–1	11–1
		First round	(Netherlands) Feyenoord	2–2	1–1	3–3 (Play-off 0–1)
1966–67	European Cup	First round	(Portugal) Sporting CP	5–0	2–0	7–0
		Second round	(Italy) Inter Milan	0–2	1–2	1–4
1967–68	European Cup	First round	(Republic of Ireland) Dundalk	8–1	1–0	9–1
		Second round	(Iceland) Valur	6–0	5–1	11–1
		Quarter-finals	(Portugal) Benfica	0–0	0–3	0–3
1971–72	UEFA Cup	First round	(Republic of Ireland) Shelbourne	1–0	1–1	2–1
		Second round	(Scotland) St Johnstone	1–0	0–2	1–2
1973–74	UEFA Cup Winners' Cup	First round	(England) Sunderland	0–2	0–1	0–3
1975–76	UEFA Cup	First round	(Austria) VOEST Linz	4–0	0–2	4–2
		Second round	(Portugal) Sporting CP	3–1	1–2	4–3
		Third round	(Spain) Barcelona	0–1	1–3	1–4
1977–78	European Cup	First round	(Germany) Borussia Mönchengladbach	0–3	1–1	1–4
1980–81	UEFA Cup	First round	(Portugal) Boavista	0–2	1–0	1–2
1981–82	UEFA Cup Winners' Cup	First round	(Cyprus) Enosis Neon Paralimni	8–0	0–1	8–1
		Second round	(Belgium) Standard Liège	0–2	1–2	1–4
1986–87	UEFA Cup Winners' Cup	First round	(Socialist Federal Republic of Yugoslavia) Velež Mostar	2–2	2–3	4–5
1987	UEFA Intertoto Cup	Group 1	(East Germany) Carl Zeiss Jena	0–2	2–2	
		Group 1	(Denmark) Aarhus GF	2–1	0–1	
		Group 1	(Switzerland) Lausanne-Sport	5–3	1–2	
1990	UEFA Intertoto Cup	Group 8	(Austria) First Vienna	0–0	1–0	
		Group 8	(Denmark) Aarhus GF	0–2	0–2	
		Group 8	(Sweden) Gefle	1–1	0–2	
1996	UEFA Intertoto Cup	Group 10, 1st game	(Belgium) Lierse	2–0		
		Group 10, 2nd game	(Turkey) Gaziantepspor		2–3	
		Group 10, 3rd game	(Estonia) Narva Trans	4–1		
		Group 10, 4th game	(Netherlands) Groningen		1–1	
1997	UEFA Intertoto Cup	Group 7, 1st game	(Sweden) Öster		4–1	
		Group 7, 2nd game	(Latvia) Universitāte Rīga	3–0		
		Group 7, 3rd game	(Turkey) İstanbulspor		0–2	
		Group 7, 4th game	(Germany) Werder Bremen	2–0		
1999	UEFA Intertoto Cup	First round	Union Luxembourg	4–0	3–1	7–1
		Second round	(Switzerland) Neuchâtel Xamax	1–0	2–0	3–0
		Third round	(Poland) Polonia Warsaw	1–2	0–2	1–4
2000–01	UEFA Cup	Qualifying round	(Latvia) Ventspils	3–1	1–2	4–3 (aet)
		First round	(Greece) AEK Athens	2–2	0–2	2–4
2005	UEFA Intertoto Cup	First round	(Slovakia) ZTS Dubnica	0–0	0–2	0–2
2017–18	UEFA Europa League	First qualifying round	(Israel) Beitar Jerusalem	0–3	3–4	3–7

== Record by country ==
- Correct as of 30 June 2017

Country	Pld	W	D	L	GF	GA	GD	Win%
Austria	4	2	1	1	5	2	+3	50.00
Belgium	3	1	0	2	3	4	−1	33.33
Bulgaria	2	1	0	1	7	3	+4	50.00
Cyprus	2	1	0	1	8	1	+7	50.00
Denmark	4	1	0	3	2	6	−4	25.00
East Germany	2	0	1	1	2	4	−2	0.00
England	2	0	0	2	0	3	−3	0.00
Estonia	1	1	0	0	4	1	+3	100.00
Germany	3	1	1	1	3	4	−1	33.33
Greece	2	0	1	1	2	4	−2	0.00
Iceland	2	2	0	0	11	1	+10	100.00
(Republic of Ireland) Ireland	4	3	1	0	11	2	+9	75.00
Israel	2	0	0	2	3	7	−4	0.00
Latvia	3	2	0	1	7	3	+4	66.67
Luxembourg	2	2	0	0	7	1	+6	100.00
Netherlands	5	1	4	0	10	6	+4	20.00
Poland	2	0	0	2	1	4	−3	0.00
Portugal	6	2	1	3	12	8	+4	33.33
Scotland	2	1	0	1	1	2	−1	50.00
Slovakia	2	0	1	1	0	2	−2	0.00
Spain	6	1	0	5	4	13	−9	16.67
Sweden	3	1	1	1	5	4	+1	33.33
Switzerland	6	4	1	1	12	7	+5	66.67
Turkey	2	0	0	2	2	5	−3	0.00
(Socialist Federal Republic of Yugoslavia) Yugoslavia	2	0	1	1	4	5	−1	0.00
Totals	39	12	9	18	41	48	–7	30.77

P – Played; W – Won; D – Drawn; L – Lost

== Club record ==
As of 1 May 2018.

- Biggest win: 30/09/1981, Vasas 8-0 (Cyprus) Enosis Neon Paralimni, Budapest
- Biggest defeat: 02/04/1958, (Spain) Real Madrid 4-0 Vasas, Madrid
- Appearances in UEFA Champions League: 6
- Appearances in UEFA Cup Winners' Cup: 4
- Appearances in UEFA Europa League: 5
- Appearances in UEFA Intertoto Cup: 4
- Player with most UEFA appearances: 22 (Hungary) Pál Berendi
- Top scorers in UEFA club competitions: 8 (Hungary) Lajos Csordás, (Hungary) János Farkas
