= Sárosi =

Sárosi is a Hungarian surname. Notable people with the name include:

- Béla Sárosi (1919 – 1993), Hungarian football player and manager
- György Sárosi (1912 – 1993), Hungarian footballer
- László Sárosi (footballer) (1932–2016), Hungarian football player and coach
- László Sárosi (water polo) (born 1946), Hungarian former water polo player
- Laura Sárosi (born 1992), Hungarian badminton player
