= 1958 FIFA World Cup final =

World Cup final, held in Sweden

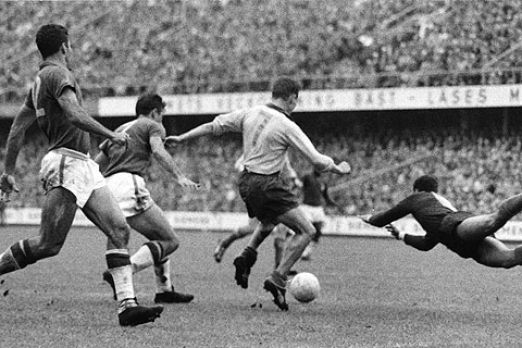
- Swedish forward Hamrin (7) attempts to score in the final
- Event: 1958 FIFA World Cup
Brazil	Sweden
5	2
- Date: 29 June 1958
- Venue: Råsunda Stadium, Solna
- Referee: Maurice Guigue (France)
- Attendance: 49,737

Brazil's route to the final
	Opponent	Result
1	Austria	3–0
2	England	0–0
3	Soviet Union	2–0
QF	Wales	1–0
SF	France	5–2

Sweden's route to the final
	Opponent	Result
1	Mexico	3–0
2	Hungary	2–1
3	Wales	0–0
QF	Soviet Union	2–0
SF	West Germany	3–1

The 1958 FIFA World Cup final took place in Råsunda Stadium, Solna (near Stockholm), Sweden, on 29 June 1958 to determine the champion of the 1958 FIFA World Cup. Brazil won the World Cup by defeating Sweden, and thus won their first World Cup title. Despite losing, the game remains Sweden’s best ever World Cup finish.

The 1958 final holds the record for most goals scored in a World Cup Final, and it shares the record for the greatest winning margin (with the 1970 and 1998 tournaments). The records for both the youngest and oldest goalscorer in a World Cup final were set in this match by Pelé (17 years and 249 days) and Nils Liedholm (35 years, 263 days) respectively. The final also marked several firsts: It was the first final to be disputed between a European team and a team from the Americas. Sweden became the first, and so far, only host to lose a World Cup Final (the Maracanazo of 1950 was the decisive match of the tournament, but was not a 'Final', because Sweden v Spain was played simultaneously). Their loss also meant that for the only time a World Cup staged in Europe was not won by a European nation.

The last survivor on Brazil's side was Mário Zagallo, who died on 5 January 2024 at the age of 92. Nearly a month later, the last survivor of the game, Sweden's Kurt Hamrin, died on 4 February 2024 at the age of 89.

== Match ==
=== Background ===
Since both teams wore a yellow kit as their first choice, a draw was arranged in order to decide which team would use its regular strip. Brazil boycotted the draw, thus making Sweden winner, and forcing Brazil to find another color to wear. Initially, Brazil was going to wear white, but this idea was rejected when the players were visibly frightened by the idea, recalling their loss in 1950. Eventually the staff went on to buy 22 blue T-shirts and sewed the Brazilian emblem.

=== Summary ===
Sweden took the lead after only 4 minutes after an excellent finish by captain Nils Liedholm. The lead did not last long, as Vavá equalised just 5 minutes later. On 32 minutes, Vavá scored a similar goal to his first to give Brazil a lead 2–1 at the break. 10 minutes into the second half, Brazil went further in front thanks to a brilliant goal scored by Pelé. He took control of the ball inside the penalty area, chipped the ball over the defender then smashed it past a helpless Kalle Svensson. Halfway through the second half Brazil went 4–1 up with a goal scored by Mário Zagallo. Simonsson pulled one back for Sweden with 10 minutes remaining but it was far too late. Pelé sealed the 5–2 victory for Brazil with a headed goal in stoppage time.

=== Details ===
29 June 1958
15:00 (CET)

Brazil	5–2	Sweden
Vavá 9', 32'; Pelé 55', 90'; Zagallo 68'		Liedholm 4'; Simonsson 80'

Råsunda Stadium, Solna
Attendance: 49,737
Referee: Maurice Guigue (France)

Brazil	Sweden

GK	3	Gilmar
RB	4	Djalma Santos
CB	2	Hilderaldo Bellini (c)
CB	15	Orlando
LB	12	Nílton Santos
RH	19	Zito
LH	6	Didi
OR	11	Garrincha
CF	20	Vavá
CF	10	Pelé
OL	7	Mário Zagallo
Manager:
Vicente Feola

GK	1	Kalle Svensson
RB	2	Orvar Bergmark
CH	14	Bengt Gustavsson
LB	3	Sven Axbom
RH	15	Reino Börjesson
LH	6	Sigge Parling
OR	7	Kurt Hamrin
IR	8	Gunnar Gren
CF	9	Agne Simonsson
IL	4	Nils Liedholm (c)
OL	11	Lennart Skoglund
Manager:
(England) George Raynor

Officials

- Linesmen:
  - Albert Dusch (West Germany)
  - Juan Gardeazábal (Spain)

Match rules

- 90 minutes
- 30 minutes of extra time if necessary
- Replay if necessary
- No substitutions permitted

== Match statistics ==
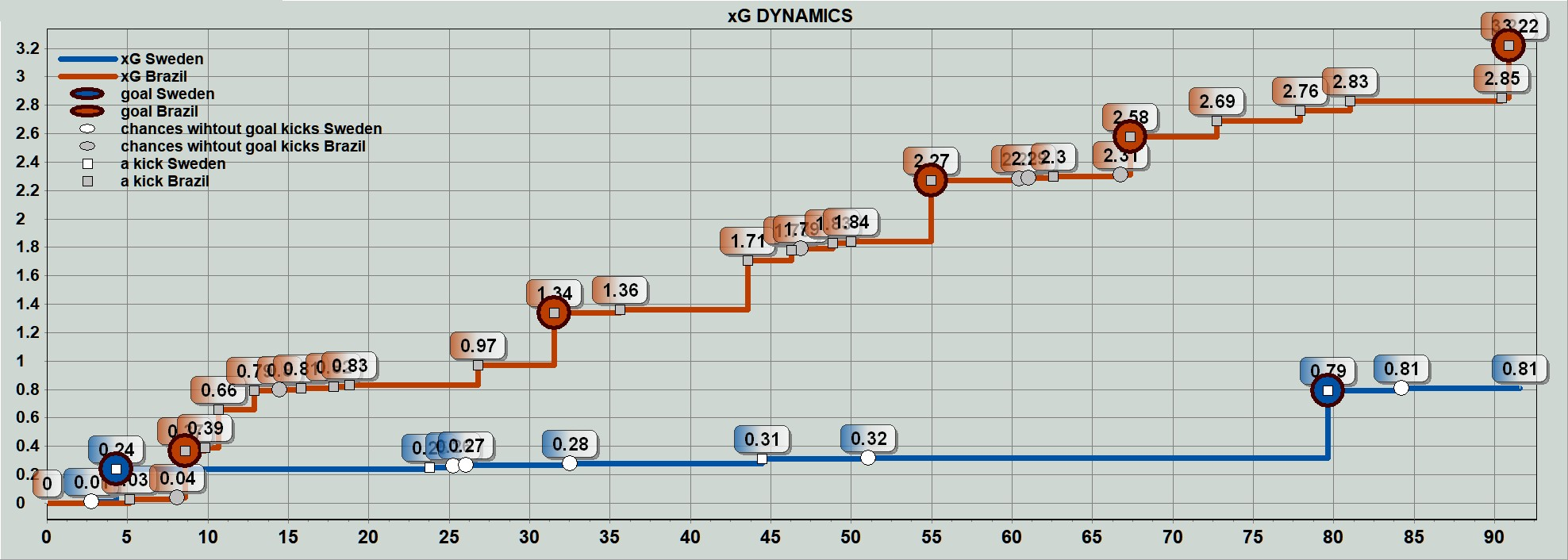
Brazil – Sweden xG dinamics. Gennady Kravtsov. "Applied Statistics".

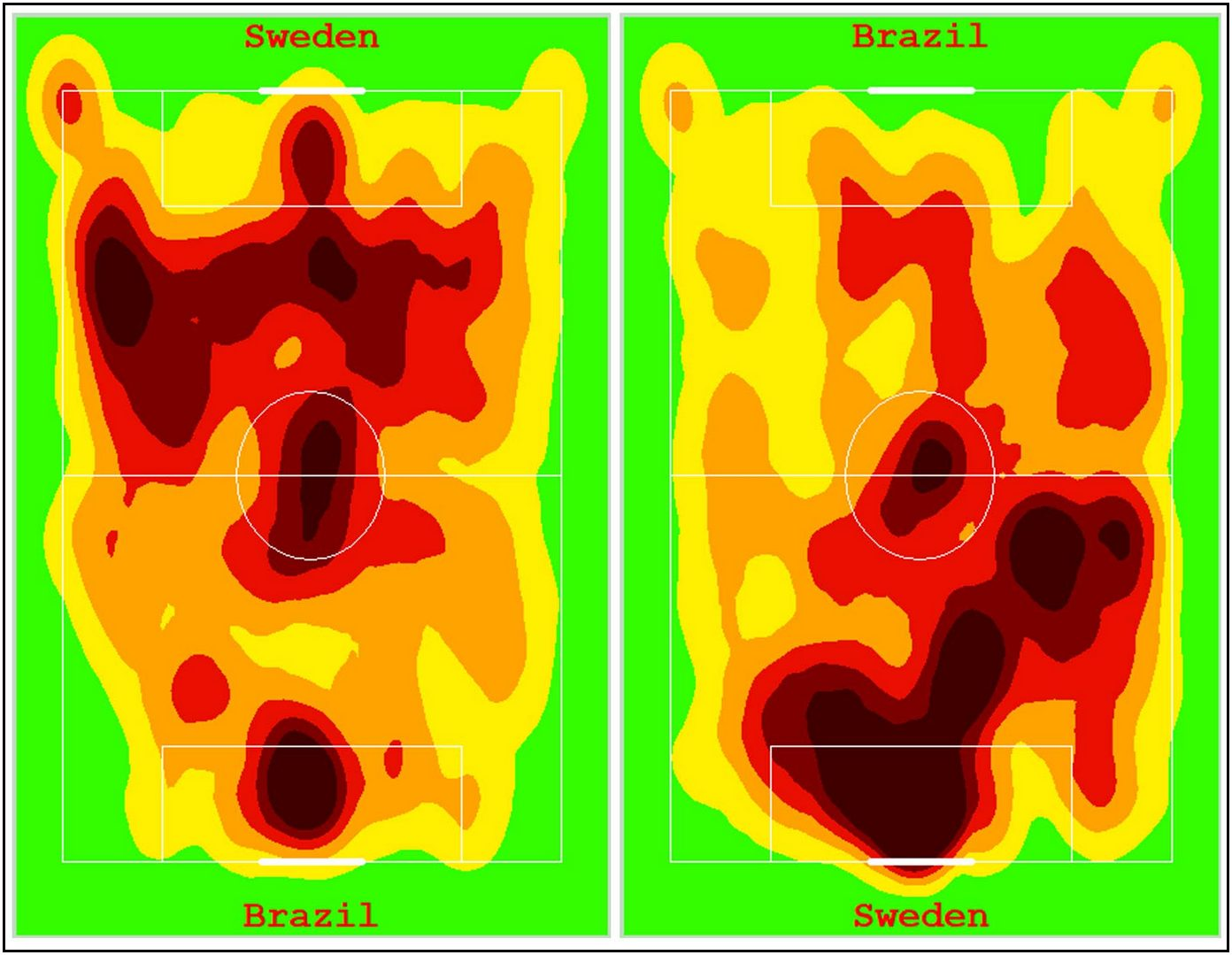
Brazil – Sweden. Heat map of activity. G. Kravtsov. "Applied Statistics".

== See also ==
- Pelé: Birth of a Legend
- Brazil at the FIFA World Cup
- Sweden at the FIFA World Cup
