= Nemesio Diez Stadium =

Football stadium in Toluca, Mexico State, Mexico

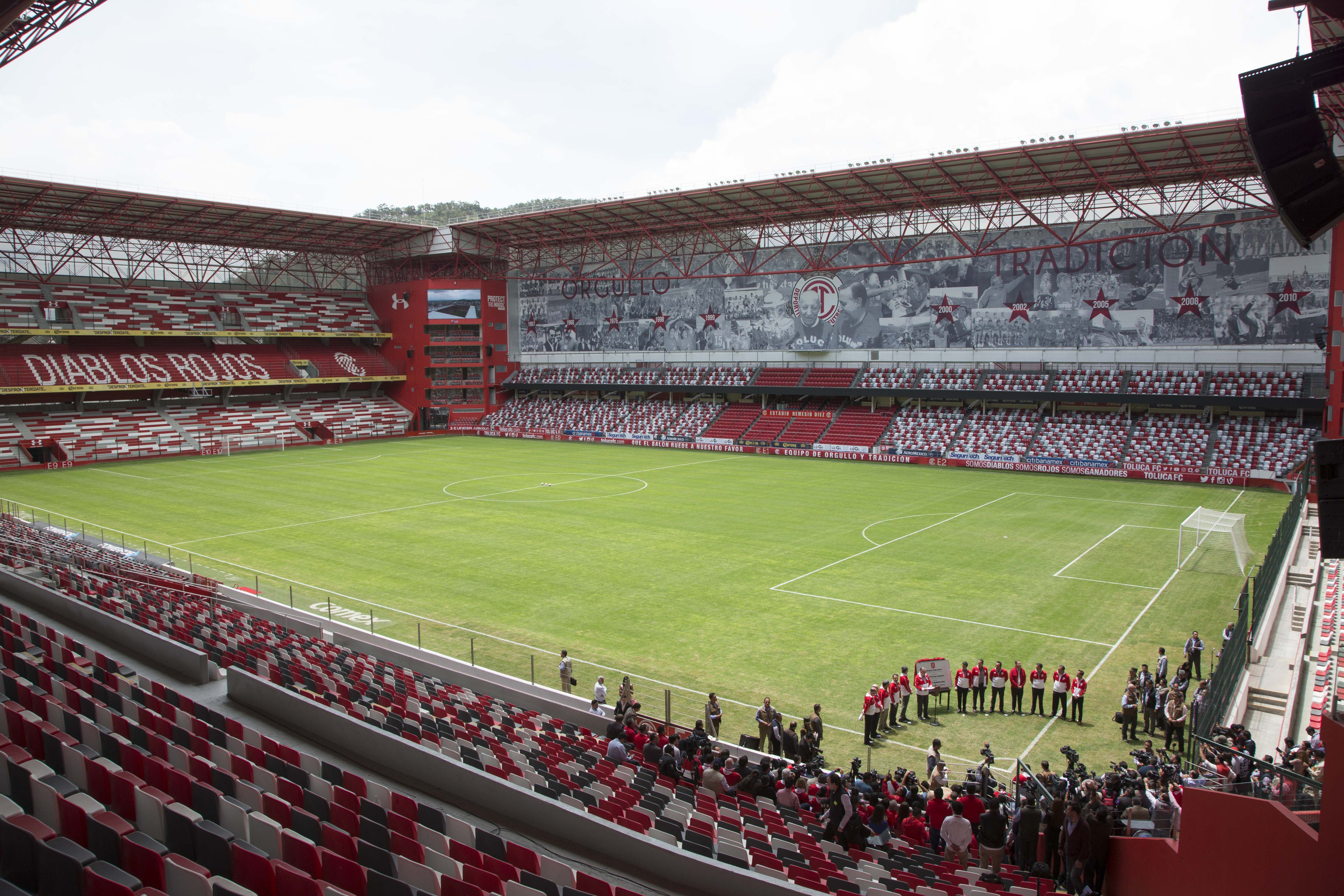
- Interactive map of Nemesio Diez Stadium
- Former names: Club Deportivo Toluca (1954-1955), Héctor Barraza (1956-1958), Luis Gutiérrez Dosal (1959–1969), Toluca 70 (1970–1985), Toluca 70–86 (1986–2000), Nemesio Diez (2000-)
- Location: Felipe Villanueva No. 300, Barrio de San Bernardino, 50080 Toluca de Lerdo, México.
- Coordinates: 19°17′14″N 99°40′0″W
- Owner: Valentín Díez Morodo
- Capacity: 30,000
- Surface: Kikuyu Grass
- Field size: 105 by 68 metres (114.8 yd × 74.4 yd)

Construction
- Opened: 8 August 1954; 72 years ago
- Renovated: 2015-2017
- Architect: Quattro + 1 Arquitectos

Tenants
- Toluca FC (1954–); Toluca FC (women) (2017–)

Website
- Estadio Nemesio Diez

Nemesio Diez Stadium (Estadio Nemesio Diez), sometimes referred to as La Bombonera (The Chocolate Box), for its resemblance, is an association football stadium located in Toluca, State of Mexico, Mexico. Opened on 8 August 1954, the stadium has a capacity of 30,000 and serves as the home of Liga MX club Toluca FC and Liga MX Femenil club Toluca FC (women). It is one of the oldest football stadiums in Mexico. The stadium has hosted matches at the 1970 and 1986 FIFA World Cups, the 1975 Pan American Games, the 1983 FIFA World Youth Championship, and the 1990 Central American and Caribbean Games.

The stadium sits at an altitude of roughly 8,750 feet (2,670 m) above sea level, one of the highest altitude stadiums in North America. The playing field is oriented from east to west, the only professional stadium in the country located in that position.

The stadium was remodeled in 2017, which brought the stadium up to modern standards, expanding the capacity to 30,000 spectators, and adding technology with additional support for screens and ambient sound, all the while preserving the English style that has characterized it, such as the proximity to the playing field.

== History ==
=== Origins ===
In its earliest years following the club's foundation in 1917, Deportivo Toluca played on a dirt field located on the old Colón Avenue (now Paseo Colón). This initial venue featured small wooden stands, a section of which was covered specifically to shield female spectators from the sun and rain. In 1919, the club acquired the "Presa de Gachupines" grounds from Francisco Negrete, later moving matches to the "Tívoli" field near the Verdiguel River, and subsequently alternating with "Campo Patria." This ground was located between Aurelio Venegas, Morelos Poniente, Felipe Villanueva, and Constituyentes streets.

The Campo Tívoli was one of the grounds used by Toluca during its early history. Located in Toluca, State of Mexico, it was in use from approximately 1919 until 1952 and served as the club's home ground during that period. Its closure in 1952 marked the end of its use by the club during the period preceding the construction and development of the stadium that would later become known as the Nemesio Díez Stadium.

During Toluca's second year in the Segunda División, Campo Patria became the team's exclusive home ground, leading to the upgrade of its stands and the installation of perimeter fencing. In 1953, the club's board formally purchased the land, securing permanent ownership of the site to begin construction of their own dedicated stadium.

Following extensive renovations, the venue was officially inaugurated on August 8, 1954.

The stadium was inaugurated on Sunday, August 8, 1954, with a match between Toluca and Yugoslavian team Dinamo Zagreb. The game was won by Dinamo 4–1. The only goal for Toluca, and the first goal in the history of the stadium, was scored by Enrique Sesma.

Initially, the stadium was opened as Estadio Club Deportivo Toluca. That name lasted until 1955, when it was changed to Estadio Héctor Barraza. Other names the stadium has had are Estadio Luis Gutiérrez Dosal (1959–1970), Estadio Toluca 70 (1970–1986), Estadio Toluca 70–86 (1986–2000), and it was also popularly known as "La Bombonera".

After the death of Nemesio Díez Riega, president and then owner of the club, in June 2000, the stadium was renamed Nemesio Díez Stadium.

The Nemesio Diez Stadium has hosted multiple Liga MX finals, including the Verano 1998, Verano 1999, Verano 2000, Invierno 2000, Apertura 2002, Apertura 2006, Apertura 2008, Bicentenario 2010, Apertura 2012, Clausura 2018, and Clausura 2025 championship series.

== International events ==
=== FIFA World Cups ===
The stadium was used as a venue for two FIFA World Cup tournaments hosted by Mexico:

- During the 1970 FIFA World Cup, it hosted group-stage matches and one quarter-final match.
- During the 1986 FIFA World Cup, it hosted three group-stage matches.

In addition to international football competitions, the stadium has hosted events of international significance, serving as a venue for the 1975 Pan American Games, the 1983 FIFA World Youth Championship, and the 1990 Central American and Caribbean Games.

== Renovation ==
=== Remodelation project ===
The comprehensive renovation of Nemesio Diez Stadium, carried out between 2015 and 2017 as part of Club Deportivo Toluca's centennial celebrations, cost between MXN$1.5 billion and MXN$1.6 billion. The project was initially announced with a lower budget, but additional work on several areas of the stadium increased the final investment significantly.

Within the Nemesio Diez, four macro support columns that will sustain the stadium structure will be built to replace the current columns obstructing visibility. In the shadow stands, a second level will be built so the capacity, which currently stands at 22,000 will increase to 30,000.

In 2015, renovation work began on Estadio Nemesio Díez as part of a modernization project undertaken in preparation for Club Deportivo Toluca's centenary in 2017. The initial work began during the break between tournaments and included modifications to the stadium's suites and the construction of the structural supports for the new roof.

As the renovation work continued, during the Apertura 2016 Toluca temporarily moved its home matches to Estadio Alberto "Chivo" Córdova, owned by the Autonomous University of the State of Mexico.

The project also includes four giant screens at each end of the building, replacement of all seats and a sunroof in the preferred (shaded) section, to assist in the process of maintaining the natural grass in the field.

During the stadium's renovation, an adjacent parking structure with capacity for approximately 1,500 vehicles was built and connected to the venue through pedestrian bridges over Felipe Villanueva Avenue.

The stadium features a technological security infrastructure that includes high-definition surveillance cameras and facial recognition technology linked to an internal command center. Based on this system, development firm Seguritech classified the venue as the most secure stadium in Mexico.

=== Opening and inauguration ===
The remodeled stadium officially opened on January 15, 2017, with a league match against Club America. The first goal was scored by Gabriel Hauche for Toluca with a screamer outside of the box. Toluca FC won that match 2–1.

The stadium was completed in the summer 2017 where it had been confirmed that the club would play against Atlético Madrid for the official inauguration of the remodeled stadium.

On February 20, 2017, the stadium was officially re-inaugurated following a major renovation to celebrate the centenary of Club Deportivo Toluca, although the team had already played its first official match in the renovated venue on January 15 against América. The official ceremony was attended by the then President of Mexico, Enrique Peña Nieto, alongside club owner Valentín Díez Morodo.

=== Later developments ===
The stadium has also gained international recognition, as it was chosen as the "Second Best Stadium in the World 2017" in the remodeled category, according to public voting conducted by StadiumDB in the same year.

After the 2014–2017 renovation, the stadium incorporated new areas such as the Tribuna Diablos supporters' section and the premium area The Club 1917.

In October 2024, the stadium debuted a new state-of-the-art LED lighting system in a match against Cruz Azul.

During the 2024 Apertura, Deportivo Toluca Fútbol Club had an attendance rate of 94.9%. According to ESPN, during the 2025 Clausura, the club has 23,000 season ticket holders out of a capacity of 30,000.

=== Premium hospitality areas ===
In addition to its regular seating areas, Nemesio Diez Stadium features several premium hospitality spaces. These include the Salón Victoria and Club 1917, VIP areas operated by Deportivo Toluca. The stadium also includes the VID section. In 2026, the venue expanded its premium offerings with Salón VID+.

== Attendance ==
During the last five Liga MX tournaments, Deportivo Toluca Fútbol Club has recorded the highest average attendance in the league, reaching approximately 94% occupancy at Nemesio Diez Stadium, according to league-wide statistical analysis.

== Finals matches played ==
In total, several definitive matches for official titles have been played at the venue featuring Deportivo Toluca as the home team, distributed among Liga MX, Copa México, Campeón de Campeones, and the CONCACAF Champions Cup. This makes it one of the stadiums with the highest activity in championship series within Mexican football.

=== Liga MX ===
First leg matches
Season	Result
Apertura 2005	Toluca 3–3 Monterrey
Apertura 2022	Toluca 1–5 Pachuca

Second leg matches
Season	Result
Verano 1998	Toluca 5–2 Necaxa
Verano 1999	Toluca 2–2 (5–4 pen.) Atlas
Verano 2000	Toluca 5–1 Santos Laguna
Apertura 2002	Toluca 4–1 Morelia
Apertura 2006	Toluca 1–2 Guadalajara
Apertura 2008	Toluca 0–2 (7–6 pen.) Cruz Azul
Bicentenario 2010	Toluca 0–0 (4–3 pen.) Santos Laguna
Apertura 2012	Toluca 1–2 Tijuana
Clausura 2018	Toluca 1–1 Santos Laguna
Clausura 2025	Toluca 2–0 América
Apertura 2025	Toluca 1–1 (9–8 pen.) Tigres UANL

=== Copa México and Campeón de Campeones ===
Copa México
Season	Match type	Result
1988–89	Second leg	Toluca 2–1 Leones Negros UDG

Campeón de Campeones
Season	Match type	Result
1967–68	First leg	Toluca 3–1 Atlas

=== International Tournaments (CONCACAF) ===
CONCACAF Champions Cup
Edition	Match type	Result
2003	Second leg	Toluca 2–1 Morelia
2006	First leg	Toluca 0–0 América
2013–14	Second leg	Toluca 1–1 Cruz Azul
2026	Single match	Toluca 1–1 (6–5 pen.) Tigres UANL

== International matches ==
=== 1970 FIFA World Cup ===
Date	Time	Team #1	Res.	Team #2	Round	Attendance
3 June 1970	16:00	Italy	1–0	Sweden	Group 2	13,433
7 June 1970	12:00	Sweden	1–1	Israel	Group 2	9,624
11 June 1970	16:00	Italy	0–0	Israel	Group 2	9,890
14 June 1970	12:00	Mexico	1–4	Italy	Quarter-finals	26,851

=== 1975 Pan American Games ===
Date	Time	Team #1	Res.	Team #2	Round
13 October 1975	12:00	Mexico	6–1	Trinidad and Tobago	First round (Group 1)
15 October 1975	12:00	United States	1–3	Mexico	First round (Group 1)
17 October 1975	12:00	Trinidad and Tobago	1–0	United States	First round (Group 1)
19 October 1975	10:00	Mexico	8–0	Canada	Second round (Group A)
19 October 1975	12:00	Costa Rica	1–0	Cuba	Second round (Group A)
21 October 1975	-	Canada	0–3*	Costa Rica	Second round (Group A)
21 October 1975	12:00	Cuba	2–2	Mexico	Second round (Group A)
23 October 1975	-	Cuba	3–0*	Canada	Second round (Group A)
23 October 1975	12:00	Mexico	7–0	Costa Rica	Second round (Group A)

* Canada withdrew from the tournament; matches were awarded as 3–0 victories for the opponents.

=== 1983 FIFA World Youth Championship ===
Date	Time	Team #1	Res.	Team #2	Round	Attendance
4 June 1983	12:00	Soviet Union	0–1	Nigeria	Group C	10,000
8 June 1983	12:00	Brazil	1–1	Nigeria	Group C	4,000
10 June 1983	12:00	Netherlands	0–0	Nigeria	Group C	4,000
12 June 1983	12:00	Argentina	2–1	Netherlands	Quarter-finals	24,830

=== 1986 FIFA World Cup ===
Date	Time	Team #1	Res.	Team #2	Round	Attendance
4 June 1986	12:00	Paraguay	1–0	Iraq	Group B	24,000
8 June 1986	12:00	Iraq	1–2	Belgium	Group B	20,000
11 June 1986	12:00	Paraguay	2–2	Belgium	Group B	16,000

=== 1990 Central American and Caribbean Games ===
Date	Team #1	Res.	Team #2	Round
21 November 1990	Mexico	5–1	Dominican Republic	First round (Group A)
23 November 1990	Antigua and Barbuda	2–2	Dominican Republic	First round (Group A)
25 November 1990	Mexico	8–0	Antigua and Barbuda	First round (Group A)
27 November 1990	Mexico	1–0	Cuba	Semi-final stage (Group 1)
29 November 1990	Trinidad and Tobago	0–2	Cuba	Semi-final stage (Group 1)
1 December 1990	Mexico	5–1	Trinidad and Tobago	Semi-final stage (Group 1)
3 December 1990	Costa Rica	2–1	Cuba	Third place match
3 December 1990	Mexico	3–0	Venezuela	Final

=== Mexico national football team ===
Date		Result		Competition	Attendance
27 October 1976	Mexico	0–0	Canada	1977 CONCACAF Championship qualification	16,350
8 April 1980	Mexico	5–1	Honduras	Friendly	20,000
29 April 1980	Mexico	2–2	Guatemala	Friendly	25,000
14 December 1985	Mexico	2–0	Hungary	Mexico Cup 1985	35,000
6 October 1987	Mexico	4–0	Canada	Friendly	30,000
13 October 2015	Mexico	1–0	Panama	Friendly	19,000
2 October 2019	Mexico	2–0	Trinidad and Tobago	Friendly	11,002
19 November 2019	Mexico	2–1	Bermuda	2019–20 CONCACAF Nations League A	10,584
19 November 2024	Mexico	4–0	Honduras	2024–25 CONCACAF Nations League A	27,273
4 June 2026	Mexico	5–1	Serbia	Friendly	27,000

== International club matches ==
=== Copa Libertadores ===
2007 Copa Libertadores

27 February 2007

Deportivo Toluca FC (Mexico)	1–2	(Bolivia) Bolívar

Estadio Nemesio Díez, Toluca
14 March 2007

Deportivo Toluca FC (Mexico)	2–0	(Argentina) Boca Juniors

Estadio Nemesio Díez, Toluca
26 April 2007

Deportivo Toluca FC (Mexico)	3–0	(Peru) Cienciano

Estadio Nemesio Díez, Toluca
8 May 2007

Deportivo Toluca FC (Mexico)	2–0	(Colombia) Cúcuta Deportivo

Estadio Nemesio Díez, Toluca

2013 Copa Libertadores

19 February 2013

Deportivo Toluca FC (Mexico)	2–3	(Uruguay) Nacional

Estadio Nemesio Díez, Toluca
7 March 2013

Deportivo Toluca FC (Mexico)	1–1	(Ecuador) Barcelona

Estadio Nemesio Díez, Toluca
17 April 2013

Deportivo Toluca FC (Mexico)	3–2	(Argentina) Boca Juniors

Estadio Nemesio Díez, Toluca

2016 Copa Libertadores

17 February 2016

Deportivo Toluca FC (Mexico)	2–0	(Brazil) Grêmio

Estadio Nemesio Díez, Toluca
5 April 2016

Deportivo Toluca FC (Mexico)	2–1	(Ecuador) LDU Quito

Estadio Nemesio Díez, Toluca
12 April 2016

Deportivo Toluca FC (Mexico)	2–1	(Argentina) San Lorenzo

Estadio Nemesio Díez, Toluca
4 May 2016

Deportivo Toluca FC (Mexico)	3–1	(Brazil) São Paulo

Estadio Nemesio Díez, Toluca

=== Copa Sudamericana ===
2006 Copa Sudamericana

26 September 2006

Deportivo Toluca FC (Mexico)	1–0	(Ecuador) El Nacional

Estadio Nemesio Díez, Toluca
1 November 2006

Deportivo Toluca FC (Mexico)	2–0	(Argentina) San Lorenzo

Estadio Nemesio Díez, Toluca
16 November 2006

Deportivo Toluca FC (Mexico)	0–2	(Chile) Colo-Colo

Estadio Nemesio Díez, Toluca

=== Copa Merconorte ===
2000 Copa Merconorte

12 July 2000

Deportivo Toluca FC (Mexico)	4–1	(Peru) Universitario

Estadio Nemesio Díez, Toluca
29 August 2000

Deportivo Toluca FC (Mexico)	0–0	(Colombia) Millonarios

Estadio Nemesio Díez, Toluca
27 September 2000

Deportivo Toluca FC (Mexico)	4–0	(Ecuador) Barcelona SC

Estadio Nemesio Díez, Toluca

== See also ==
- Toluca FC
- Toluca FC (women)
