= Sven Axbom =

Swedish footballer (1926–2006)

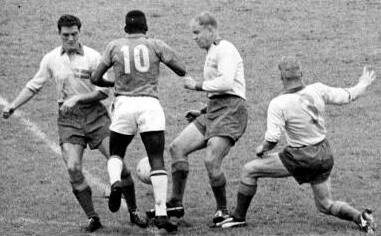
- Axbom (right), Bengt Gustavsson and Sigge Parling defending against Pelé in the 1958 FIFA World Cup

Personal information
- Full name: Sven Erik Emanuel Axbom
- Date of birth: 15 October 1926
- Place of birth: Kimstad, Sweden
- Date of death: 8 April 2006 (aged 79)
- Position: Defender

Senior career*
Years	Team	Apps	(Gls)
1954–1960	IFK Norrköping	533	(11)

International career
1955–1960	Sweden	31	(0)
Medal record
Representing Sweden
Men's Football
FIFA World Cup
Runner-up	1958 Sweden
- * Club domestic league appearances and goals

Sven Axbom (15 October 1926 − 8 April 2006) was a Swedish footballer who was capped on 31 occasions by Sweden between 1955 and 1960. He played in all six games for Sweden at the 1958 FIFA World Cup, including the final against Brazil.

He was born in Kimstad near Norrköping. He played club football for IFK Norrköping, and in the 1960 season appeared in 16 games for them, whilst in 1956-57 he played two games for them in the European Cup.
