= Carlos Blanco (footballer, born 1928) =

Spanish-born Mexican footballer

Personal information
- Full name: Carlos Blanco Castañeda
- Date of birth: 5 March 1927
- Place of birth: Madrid, Spain
- Date of death: 9 January 2011 (aged 83)
- Position: Forward

Senior career*
Years	Team	Apps	(Gls)
- Club Necaxa

International career
1952–1958	Mexico	7	(0)
- * Club domestic league appearances and goals

Carlos Blanco Castañeda (5 March 1927 – 9 January 2011) was a Spanish-born Mexican footballer who played as a forward. He represented Mexico in the 1954 and 1958 FIFA World Cups, and played for Club Necaxa and Deportivo Toluca at club level.
