= Antonio López Herranz =

Spanish footballer and manager (1913–1959)

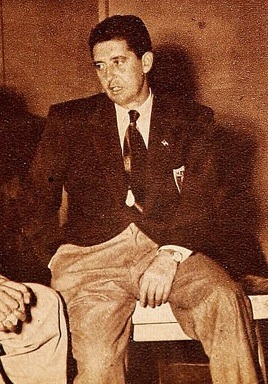
- López Herranz in 1952

Personal information
- Full name: José Antonio López Herranz
- Date of birth: 4 May 1913
- Place of birth: Madrid, Spain
- Date of death: 29 September 1959 (aged 46)
- Place of death: Los Angeles, United States
- Position: Striker

Senior career*
Years	Team	Apps	(Gls)
1934–1935	Nacional Madrid	12	(7)
1935–1936	Real Madrid	1	(1)
1937–1938	América		
1939–1940	Real Madrid	2	(0)
1940–1941	Hércules	15	(6)
1941–1942	Sabadell	14	(3)
1942–1944	Mallorca		
Total		44	(17)

Managerial career
- 1950: Mexico
- 1951–1952: León
- 1952: Mexico
- 1953–1959: Mexico
- 1955–1956: León
- 1957–1958: León
Medal record
Representing Mexico
Men's Football
Central American and Caribbean Games
Gold medal – first place	1938 Panama	Team competition
- * Club domestic league appearances and goals

Antonio López Herranz (4 May 1913 – 29 September 1959) was a Spanish professional football striker and manager.

== Playing career ==
Born in Madrid, López Herranz spent two seasons with local Real Madrid, appearing in only three games in La Liga during his spell and scoring in a 3–3 home draw against Sevilla FC on 8 March 1936 which was his debut. The competition was not held from 1936 to 1939 due to the Spanish Civil War, and he played one year in Mexico with Club América during that hiatus.

López Herranz signed for Hércules CF, also in the Spanish top flight, in 1940. In his only season, in which the Valencian Community club narrowly avoided relegation, he scored braces against Real Murcia CF (4–0, home) and Sevilla (8–3 away loss).

== Coaching career ==
López Herranz returned to Mexico at the start of World War II, and definitely settled there. He started working with Club León.

López Herranz was head coach of the Mexico national side in two FIFA World Cups, 1954 and 1958. The team only managed to collect one point from both tournaments, with the subsequent group-stage eliminations.

== Death ==
López Herranz died in Los Angeles, United States on 29 September 1959, due to severe respiratory problems which even required the insertion of an artificial lung. He was 46 years old.

== Honours ==
=== Player ===
Mexico

- Central American and Caribbean Games: 1938

=== Manager ===
León

- Liga MX: 1951–52, 1955–56
- Copa MX: 1957–58
- Campeón de Campeones: 1956
