= Ferenc Szojka =

Hungarian footballer (1931–2011)

Personal information
- Date of birth: 7 April 1931
- Place of birth: Salgótarján, Hungary
- Date of death: 17 September 2011 (aged 80)
- Place of death: Salgótarján, Hungary
- Position: Midfielder

Senior career*
Years	Team	Apps	(Gls)
1950–1966	Salgótarjáni BTC	324	(16)

International career
1954–1960	Hungary	28	(1)
Medal record
Representing Hungary
FIFA World Cup
Runner-up	1954 Switzerland
- * Club domestic league appearances and goals

Ferenc Szojka (7 April 1931 – 17 September 2011) was a Hungarian footballer who played as a midfielder for Hungary in the 1954 and 1958 FIFA World Cups. He also played for Salgótarjáni BTC. He was part of Hungary's squad at the 1952 Summer Olympics, but he did not play in any matches.
