= Antal Kotász =

Hungarian footballer (1929–2003)

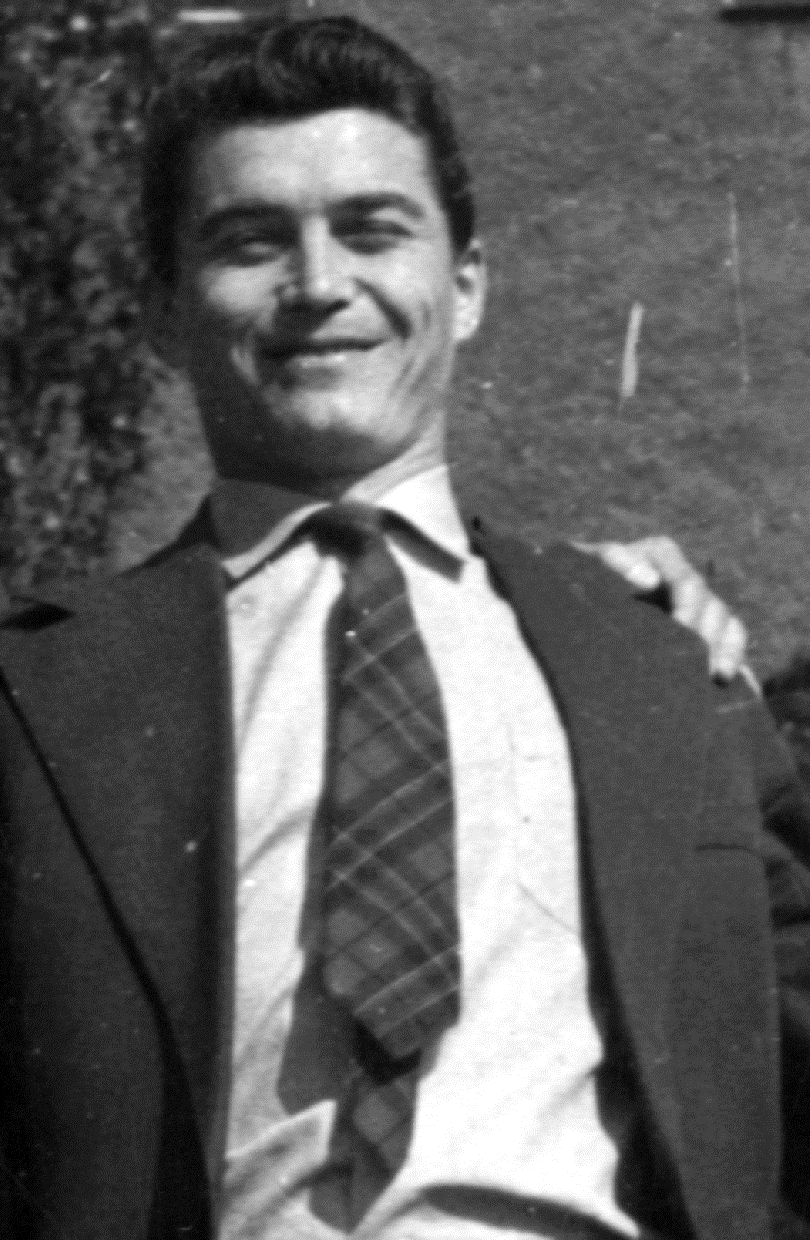
- Antal Kotász, 1959

Personal information
- Full name: Antal Kotász
- Date of birth: 1 September 1929
- Place of birth: Vasvár, Hungary
- Date of death: 6 July 2003 (aged 73)
- Place of death: Budapest, Hungary
- Position: Midfielder

Senior career*
Years	Team	Apps	(Gls)
1955–1963	Budapest Honvéd	179	(7)

International career
1954–1961	Hungary	37	(0)
- * Club domestic league appearances and goals

Antal Kotász (1 September 1929 – 6 July 2003) was a Hungarian football midfielder who played for Hungary in the 1958 FIFA World Cup. He also played for Budapest Honvéd.
