= Francisco Flores (footballer, born 1926) =

Mexican footballer (1926–1986)

Personal information
- Full name: Francisco Flores Córdoba
- Date of birth: 12 February 1926
- Place of birth: Guadalajara, Mexico
- Date of death: 13 November 1986 (aged 60)
- Height: 1.76 m (5 ft 9 in)
- Position: Midfielder

Senior career*
Years	Team	Apps	(Gls)
1951–1962	Guadalajara		

International career
1958–1961	Mexico	13	(5)
- * Club domestic league appearances and goals

Francisco Flores Córdoba (12 February 1926 – 13 November 1986) was a Mexican professional footballer, who played as a midfielder for Mexico national team (Spanish: Selección de fútbol de México) in the 1958 FIFA World Cup.

== Club career ==
He also played for Chivas.
