= István Ilku =

Hungarian footballer

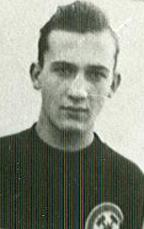

Personal information
- Date of birth: 6 March 1933
- Place of birth: Budapest, Hungary
- Date of death: 17 April 2005 (aged 72)
- Place of death: Dorog, Hungary
- Position: Goalkeeper

Senior career*
Years	Team	Apps	(Gls)
1953–1968	Dorogi FC	404	(1)

International career
1956–1963	Hungary	10	(0)
- * Club domestic league appearances and goals

István Ilku (6 March 1933 – 17 April 2005) was a Hungarian football goalkeeper who played for Hungary in the 1958 and 1962 FIFA World Cups. He also played for Dorogi FC.
