= Miguel Gutiérrez (footballer, born 1931) =

Mexican footballer

Personal information
- Full name: Miguel Gutiérrez Gutiérrez
- Date of birth: 7 May 1931
- Place of birth: Mexico City, Mexico
- Date of death: 1 February 2016 (aged 84)
- Position: Forward

Senior career*
Years	Team	Apps	(Gls)
- Club León

International career
1957–1959	Mexico	8	(0)
- * Club domestic league appearances and goals

Miguel Gutiérrez Gutiérrez (7 May 1931 – 1 February 2016) was a Mexican footballer, who played forward for Mexico in the 1958 FIFA World Cup. He also played for Club Atlas.
