= Maurice Guigue =

French football referee (1912–2011)

Maurice Alexandre Guigue (4 August 1912 – 27 February 2011) was a football referee from France, who led the 1958 FIFA World Cup Final in Stockholm, Sweden, between Brazil and hosts Sweden. He was the second Frenchman, after Georges Capdeville in 1938, to referee a World Cup final.

== Major matches refereed ==
Date	Match	Tournament	Venue	Result	Ref
29 June 1958	Brazil vs. Sweden	1958 FIFA World Cup final	Råsunda Stadium, Solna	5–2	

Sporting positions (France) Maurice Guigue
Preceded by 1954 FIFA World Cup Final (England); William Ling	1958 FIFA World Cup Final Referee	Succeeded by 1962 FIFA World Cup Final (Soviet Union); Nikolay Latyshev
