= Kalle Svensson =

Swedish footballer

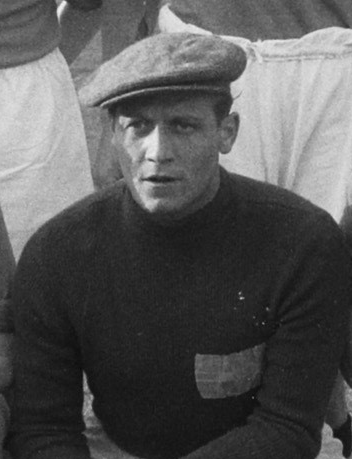
- Kalle Svensson in 1952

Personal information
- Full name: Karl-Oskar Svensson
- Date of birth: 11 November 1925
- Place of birth: Västerlöv, Sweden
- Date of death: 15 July 2000 (aged 74)
- Place of death: Helsingborg, Sweden
- Position: Goalkeeper

Senior career*
Years	Team	Apps	(Gls)
1943–1959	Helsingborgs IF	312	(0)
1959–1961	Gunnarstorps IF	34	(0)
1961–1962	Helsingborgs IF	37	(0)

International career
1949–1958	Sweden	73	(0)
Medal record
Representing Sweden
Olympic Games
Gold medal – first place	1948 London
Bronze medal – third place	1952 Helsinki
FIFA World Cup
Third place	1950 Brazil
Runner-up	1958 Sweden
- * Club domestic league appearances and goals

Karl-Oskar Svensson (11 November 1925 – 15 July 2000), often nicknamed Rio-Kalle, was a Swedish football goalkeeper from Helsingborg. He played on elite level for Helsingborgs IF during his whole career, debuting in Allsvenskan only 18 years old on 4 June 1944. He stood between the posts in 349 Allsvenskan matches, from his debut to the spring of 1959, after which he quit playing on elite level.

He continued to play for local team Gunnarstorps IF, but made a comeback in Helsingborgs IF in June 1961, playing there until his last match on 21 October 1962. When he was not playing football, Kalle Svensson worked as a fire fighter in his hometown Helsingborg.

== Career ==
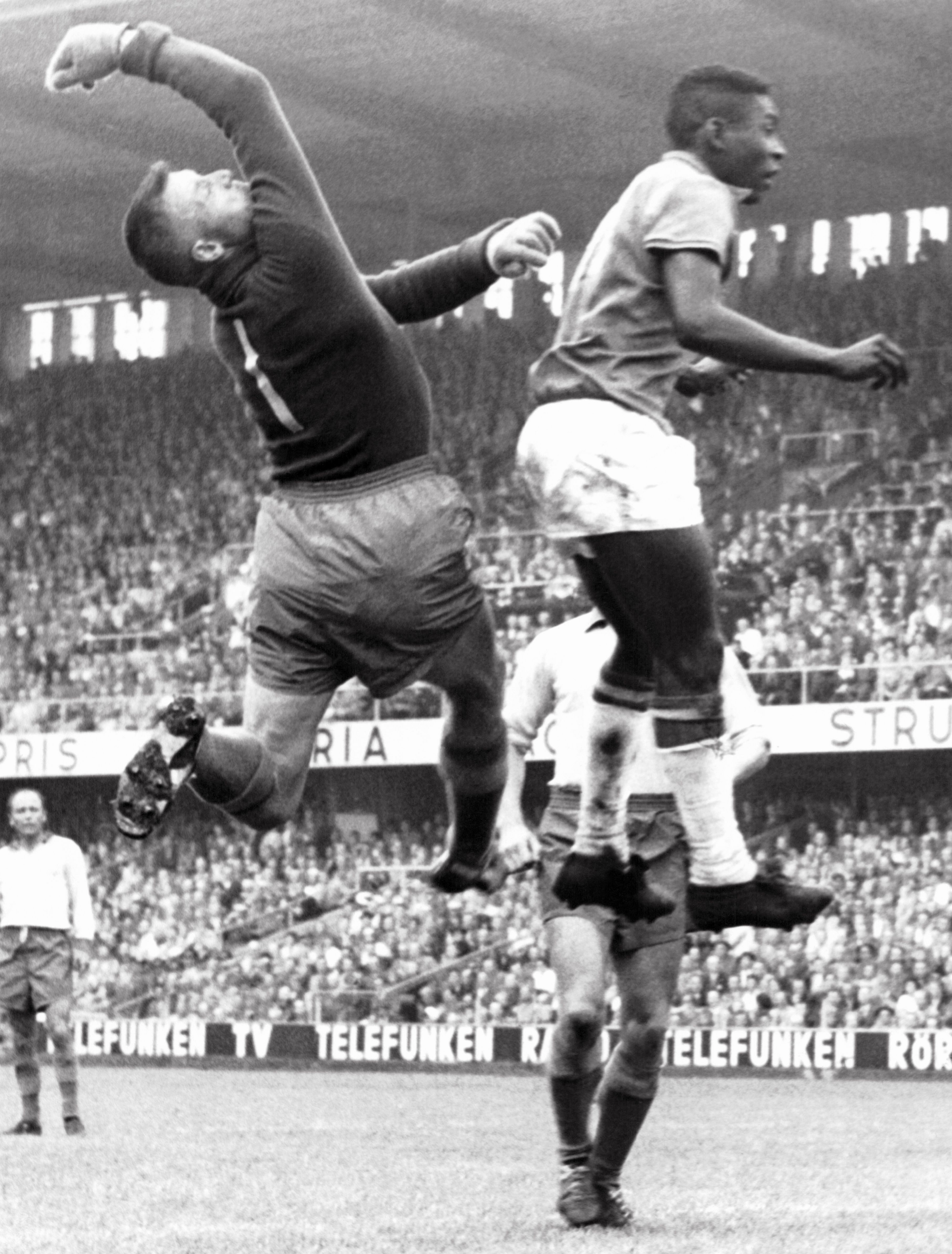
Svensson (left) facing Pelé (right)

His 349 matches in the highest league is the third most for a goalkeeper in Allsvenskan. He also has got the less impressive record of being the goalkeeper who has conceded the highest number of goals in Allsvenskan, a total of 575. He never won Allsvenskan with his club, Helsingborgs IF finished second two times, third three times and fourth three times during his career, giving him a total of eight medals (as fourth placed teams are awarded medals in Allsvenskan), but no gold, missing it by having a lower goal difference in 1948–49, and by being one point behind in 1953–54. He was the first goalkeeper to receive the Swedish Football Association award for best Swedish footballer, Guldbollen, in 1952.

His national team career is more impressive, gaining 73 caps between his debut 13 May 1949 at home against England (3–1) and his final match 29 June 1958 against Brazil in the World Cup final which ended in a 2–5 loss. Karl Svensson played in four of the big tournaments, the 1950 and 1958 World Cups, as well as the 1948 and 1952 Olympic Games, winning a medal in all four. His nickname Rio-Kalle, derived from Rio de Janeiro and the common Swedish nickname for Karl, Kalle, was given to him during the 1950 World Cup in Brazil after two heroic matches against Italy and Spain, which both actually were played on Estádio do Pacaembu in São Paulo.

Kalle Svensson has been honoured with a statue placed outside Olympia in Helsingborg which was made by sculptor Risto Karvinen.

== Club career ==
- Kullavägens BK (1940–43)
- Helsingborgs IF (43–59)
- Gunnarstorps IF (59–61)
- Helsingborgs IF (61–62)

== Honours ==
Sweden

- FIFA World Cup runner-up: 1958
- FIFA World Cup third place: 1950
- Summer Olympics: 1948
- Summer Olympics third place: 1952

== Sources ==
- Alsiö, Martin; Frantz, Alf; Lindahl, Jimmy; Persson, Gunnar, eds. (2004). 100 år: Svenska fotbollförbundets jubileumsbok 1904–2004, del 2: statistiken. Vällingby: Stroemberg Media Group. ISBN 91-86184-59-8.
- Lindahl, Jimmy (2000). "Kalle Svensson – målvakten med flest insläppta mål i Allsvenskan genom tiderna" (PDF). Sveriges Fotbollshistoriker och Statistiker.
