= Pál Berendy =

Hungarian footballer (1932–2019)

Personal information
- Date of birth: 30 November 1932
- Place of birth: Budapest, Kingdom of Hungary
- Date of death: 4 September 2019 (aged 86)
- Position: Midfielder

Senior career*
Years	Team	Apps	(Gls)
1951–1968	Vasas SC	382	(4)

International career
1956–1960	Hungary	24	(0)
- * Club domestic league appearances and goals

Pál Berendy (30 November 1932 – 4 September 2019) was a Hungarian footballer who played as a midfielder for Hungary in the 1958 FIFA World Cup. He also played for Vasas SC.
