= Terry Medwin =

Welsh footballer (1932–2024)

Personal information
- Full name: Terence Cameron Medwin
- Date of birth: 25 September 1932
- Place of birth: Swansea, Glamorgan, Wales
- Date of death: 1 May 2024 (aged 91)
- Position: Outside right

Senior career*
Years	Team	Apps	(Gls)
1949–1956	Swansea Town	147	(57)
1956–1963	Tottenham Hotspur	197	(65)
Total		344	(122)

International career
1953–1963	Wales	30	(6)

Managerial career
- 1965–1967: Cheshunt
- * Club domestic league appearances and goals

Terence Cameron Medwin (25 September 1932 – 1 May 2024) was a Welsh footballer who played as an outside right for Swansea Town and Tottenham Hotspur. At international level, he made 30 appearances for the Wales national team scoring six goals.

== Early life ==
Terry Medwin's father was a warden who worked at Swansea prison, and Terry was born in one of the flats. Going to school in Swansea, Medwin went on to captain the Swansea Schoolboys team which also included John Charles. After school it was noted that he worked at Morsmith Motors as a trainee mechanic.

== Club career ==
Medwin signed for his 'home town' team Swansea Town as an amateur, and in 1949, he signed professional papers with the club. It was not until January 1952 that he made his senior team debut against Blackburn Rovers. Medwin went on to make 147 Football League appearances for the Swans.

Medwin moved to Tottenham Hotspur for £25,000 in May 1956. He scored twice on his debut in a 4–1 victory over Preston North End at Deepdale in August 1956. Medwin played for Spurs until May 1963 when on a tour of South Africa he broke his leg that forced his early retirement. During this period he scored 72 goals in 215 matches in all competitions and helped the club win the Double in 1960–61, and he also appeared for them in the victorious 1962 FA Cup Final.

== International career ==
Medwin made first appearance for Wales in April 1953 in a 3–2 away victory against Ireland. He represented Wales in the 1958 FIFA World Cup, playing in four of the five games in which Wales played and scoring the game-winning goal in the first round 2–1 play-off against Hungary which sent Wales to the quarter-finals. He was the last player to score for Wales in the finals of a major tournament, until Gareth Bale scored in Wales' opening game of UEFA Euro 2016. In total he earned 30 caps and scored six goals for Wales from 1953 to 1963.

== After retirement ==
After his playing career ended, Medwin managed Cheshunt, coached at Cardiff City, Fulham, Norwich City and was assistant manager to John Toshack at Swansea. In 1971, he was the trainer of a Wales XI side that toured Asia and Oceania and which was managed by Dave Bowen.

Medwin died on 1 May 2024 at the age of 91.

== Honours ==
Tottenham Hotspur

- Football League First Division: 1960–61
- FA Cup: 1960–61, 1961–62
- FA Charity Shield: 1961, 1962
