= Jaime Belmonte =

Mexican footballer (1934–2009)

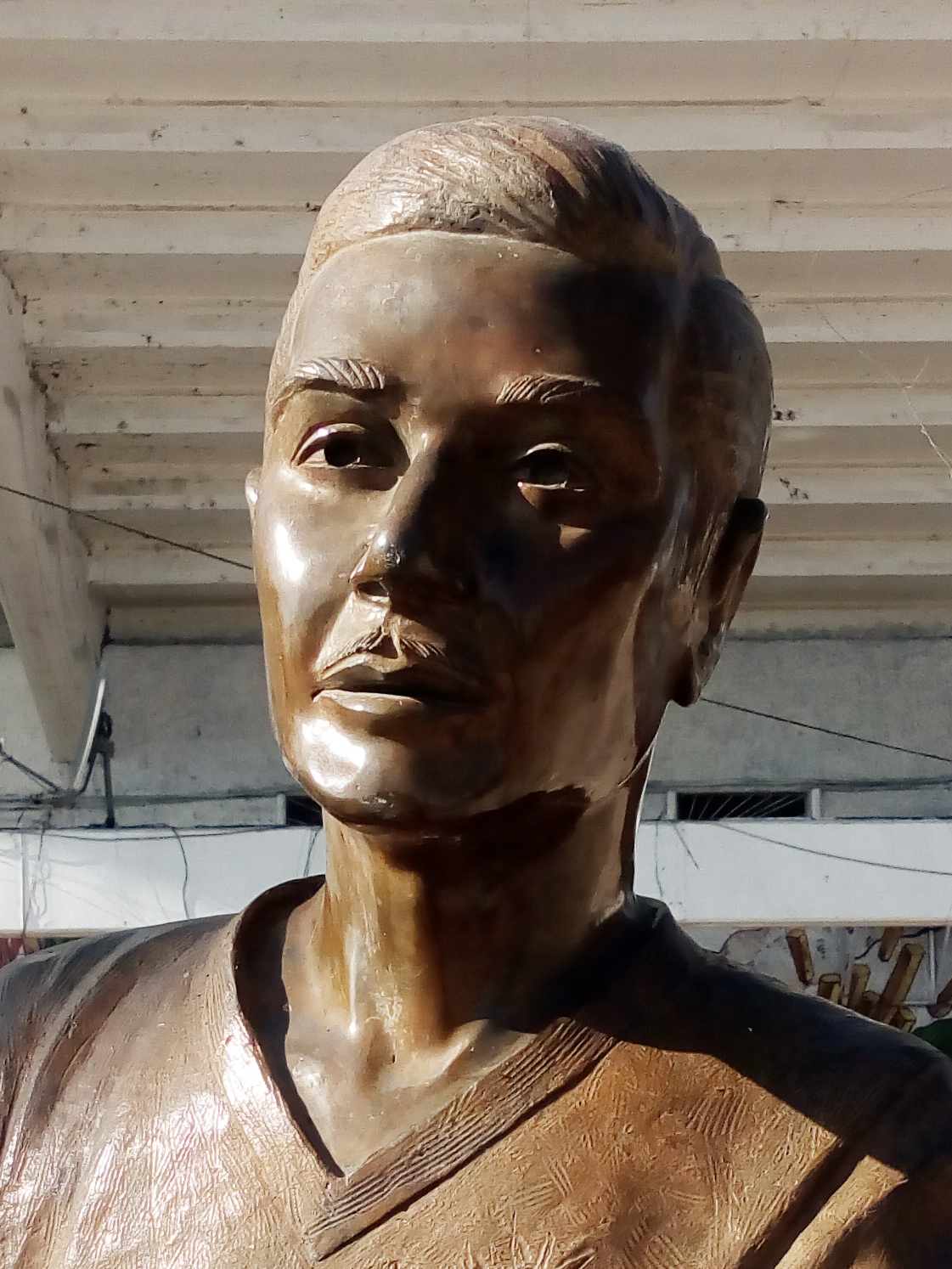

Personal information
- Full name: Jaime Belmonte Magdaleno
- Date of birth: 8 October 1934
- Place of birth: Mexico City, Mexico
- Date of death: 21 January 2009 (aged 74)
- Place of death: Irapuato, Mexico
- Position: Midfielder

Senior career*
Years	Team	Apps	(Gls)
1955–1959	Cuautla	89	
1959–1970	Irapuato	349	(125)

International career^{‡}
1957–1966	Mexico	7	(2)
- * Club domestic league appearances and goals as of September 2012 ‡ National team caps and goals as of September 2012

Jaime Belmonte Magdaleno (8 October 1934 – 21 January 2009), was a Mexican professional footballer, known as El Flaco (The Slim Man), He was also called El héroe de Solna (The hero of Solna), in reference to his goal scored vs Wales in the city of Solna during the 1958 World Cup earning Mexico's first point in a World Cup.

== Career ==
Born in Mexico City, Belmonte began playing professional football with Deportivo Cuautla. He made 89 appearances for the club from 1955 to 1959. In 1959, he joined Deportivo Irapuato. In 13 seasons with Irapuato, Belmonte scored 125 goals.

== International ==
Belmonte played for the Mexico national football team at the 1958 FIFA World Cup in Sweden. He scored the goal in a 1–1 draw with Wales in Solna, earning Mexico its first point at the World Cup hence earning the nickname the hero of Solna.

== Personal ==
Belmonte died from cancer in 2009 at age 74.

In 2012, Belmonte received a statue in his honour, outside Irapuato FC's stadium Estadio Sergio León Chávez.
