= Enrique Sesma =

Mexican footballer (born 1927)

Personal information
- Full name: Enrique Sesma Ponce de León
- Date of birth: 22 April 1927 (age 99)
- Place of birth: Puebla Mexico
- Position: Forward

Senior career*
| Years | Team | Apps | (Gls) |
- Deportivo Toluca

International career
| 1949–1958 | Mexico | 10 | (2) |
- * Club domestic league appearances and goals

Enrique Sesma Ponce de León (born 22 April 1927) is a Mexican former football forward who played for Mexico in the 1958 FIFA World Cup. He also played for Deportivo Toluca. He is the last Mexican surviving player from the 1958 World Cup and the oldest-living World Cup player.
