= László Sárosi (footballer) =

Hungarian footballer and coach

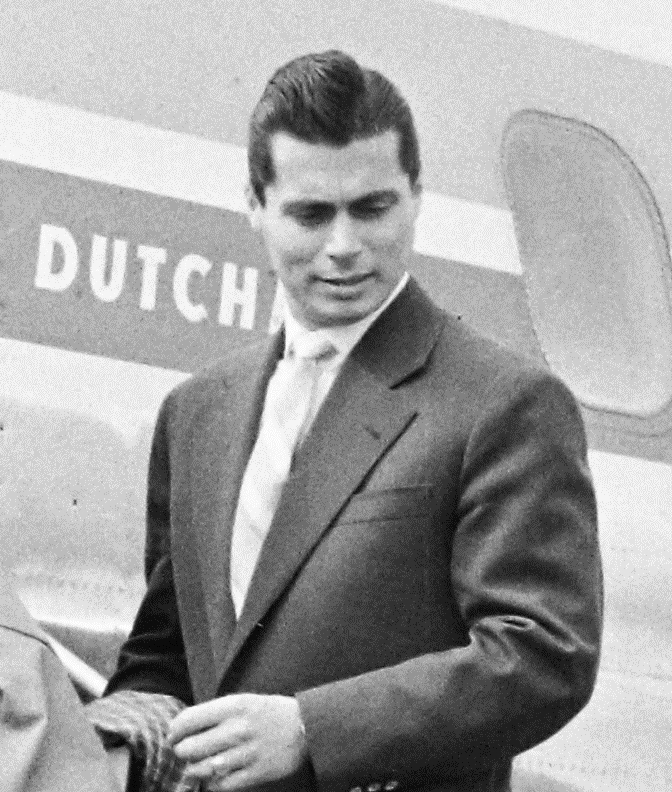
- Sárosi in 1961

Personal information
- Date of birth: 27 February 1932
- Place of birth: Budapest, Hungary
- Date of death: 2 April 2016 (aged 84)
- Position: Defender

Senior career*
| Years | Team | Apps | (Gls) |
| 1949–1966 | Vasas SC | | |

International career
| 1956–1965 | Hungary | 46 | (0) |

Managerial career
- 1968: Debreceni VSC
- 1971–1974: Hungary, youth
- 1974–1979: Haladás VSE
- 1979–1981: Volán SC
- 1982–1983: MTK Budapest FC
- 1985: Ferencvárosi TC
- 1985–1986: Al-Nasr
- 1987–1988: Volán SC
- 1990–1991: Haladás VSE
- * Club domestic league appearances and goals

László Sárosi (27 February 1932 – 2 April 2016) was a Hungarian footballer and coach.

During his club career he played for Vasas SC. He earned 46 caps for the Hungary national football team from 1957 to 1965, and participated in the 1958 FIFA World Cup, 1962 FIFA World Cup, and the 1964 European Nations' Cup.

He is not related to the Sárosi brothers who played for Hungary in the 1938 FIFA World Cup.
