= Sigge Parling =

Swedish footballer (1930–2016)

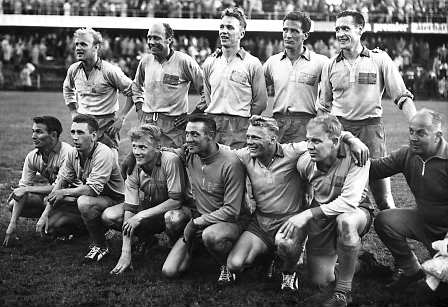
- Parling (front right) with Sweden in 1958

Personal information
- Full name: Sigvard Emanuel Parling
- Date of birth: 26 March 1930
- Place of birth: Valbo, Sweden
- Date of death: 17 September 2016 (aged 86)
- Position: Midfielder

Youth career
- –1945: Forsbacka IK
- 1946–1949: Sandvikens AIK

Senior career*
Years	Team	Apps	(Gls)
1949–1956	Djurgårdens IF	150	(12)
1957	Lycksele IF		
1957–1960	Djurgårdens IF		
1961–1962	IK Sirius		
1963–1966	Gefle IF		
1967	Sandvikens AIK		
1974	Hedesunda IF		

International career
	Sweden B	3	(0)
1954–1960	Sweden	38	(0)

Managerial career
- 1960: Vallentuna BK
- 1961–1962: IK Sirius
- 1965–1966: Gefle IF
- 1967: Sandvikens AIK
- 1968–1969: Gefle IF
Medal record
Men's Football
Representing Sweden
FIFA World Cup
Runner-up	1958 Sweden
- * Club domestic league appearances and goals

Sigvard Emanuel "Sigge" Parling (26 March 1930 – 17 September 2016) was a Swedish footballer. He also played ice hockey and bandy.

During his career he played for Djurgårdens IF (1949–1960), IK Sirius (1960–1963) and Gefle IF (1963–1965). His position was left midfielder and was considered a very rough but fair player. During his time in Djurgården he was known as the first Järnkamin (Iron Stove). Parling was capped 195 times for Djurgården and scored 12 goals. He won the Swedish Championship twice with Djurgårdens IF, 1955 and 1959.

Parling was part of the legendary Sweden national team that reached the final of the 1958 FIFA World Cup on home soil, and was capped 38 times for his country between 1954 and 1960.

Parling is the only player from Djurgårdens IF who has played a World Cup Final. He died on 17 September 2016 at the age of 86.

As a bandy player, Parling won the Swedish Bandy Final together with IK Sirius in 1961.

== Honours ==
Djurgårdens IF

- Allsvenskan: 1954–55, 1959
