= Bengt Gustavsson =

Swedish footballer and manager (1928–2017)

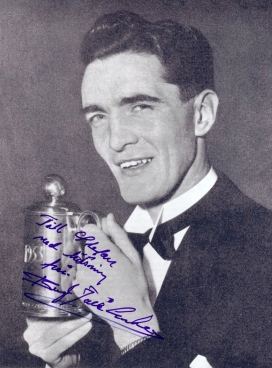
- Gustavsson in 1968

Personal information
- Date of birth: 13 January 1928
- Place of birth: Ringarum, Sweden
- Date of death: 16 February 2017 (aged 89)
- Place of death: Norrköping, Sweden
- Position: Defender

Senior career*
Years	Team	Apps	(Gls)
1947–1955	IFK Norrköping	147	(17)
1956–1961	Atalanta	145	(0)
1961–1965	Åtvidabergs FF		

International career
1951–1963	Sweden	57	(0)

Managerial career
- 1964–1970: Åtvidabergs FF
- 1971–1972: Swedish national youth team
- 1973–1974: Östers IF
- 1975–1978: IFK Norrköping
- 1979–1981: Hammarby IF
- 1982–1983: IK Sleipner
- 1985: IFK Norrköping (Assistant)
Medal record
Representing Sweden
Bronze medal – third place	1952 Helsinki
FIFA World Cup
Runner-up	1958 Sweden
- * Club domestic league appearances and goals

Bengt Olov Emanuel "Julle" Gustavsson (13 January 1928 – 16 February 2017) was a Swedish professional footballer and manager. As player he played as a defender and represented Sweden; he participated in the final of the 1958 FIFA World Cup on home soil, losing out to Brazil, and won national championships with IFK Norrköping. As coach he led Åtvidabergs FF into its golden era at the beginning of the 1970s.

== Career ==
Bengt started playing with the local team of Gusum and in 1947 joined the then nationally dominating club IFK Norrköping. At the end of the era of the great Hungarian coach Lajos Czeizler he was supposed to replace Gunnar Nordahl in midfield after he moved to AC Milan in 1949. In his first match against AIK he scored three goals, but the Austrian coach Karl Adamek, who was in charge from 1950 forward, moved him back into the defence where he should excel. In those years Norrköping won the Swedish championship of the years 1948, 1852 and 1956 and reached the cup final of 1953.

In October 1951, Gustavsson debuted in the national team at their defeat against Denmark in Copenhagen. This was the last match of the 1948-51 Nordic Football Championship, which Sweden nevertheless finished as winner. In the following year he participated with Sweden at the football tournament of the 1952 Olympics in Helsinki. After losing in the semifinals to the ascending Golden Team of Hungary with 0–6 Sweden won the bronze medal, winning the third place match against Germany with 2–0. In 1953 Gustavsson was awarded the Guldbollen, the Golden Ball as Swedish footballer of the year.

In 1956, Gustavsson joined the Italian first division side Atalanta Bergamo. There he was from the beginning as Libero a stalwart of the defence. In 1958 Atalanta was relegated to the second division, but returned to the Serie A the season after under coach Karl Adamek, who was in charge of the team for a year.

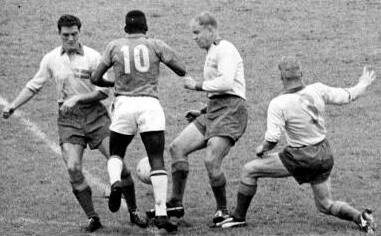
Gustavsson (l) and two other Swedish players against Pelé in the World Cup final of 1958

In 1958 Gustavsson was nominated for the campaign of national team in the World Cup 1958 in Sweden, and was there part of the standard formation alongside Nils Liedholm, Lennart Skoglund and Kurt Hamrin who then also plied their trade in Italy. Losing to Brazil in the final 2–5 nevertheless secured the Swedes the best result in any World Cup.

After the season 1960–62, Gustavsson returned to Sweden and joined then second division side Åtvidabergs FF. In June 1963 her played his 57th and last match for Sweden in a qualifying match for the 1964 European Nations' Cup in Belgrade against Yugoslavia, which ended in a 0–0 draw. On club level he was player-manager from 1964 on. He finished his career as a player in 1965, but remained at the helm of the south Swedish club.

In 1967, he led the club for the only second time in its history – since a brief stint in 1951–52 – into the Swedish first division, the Allsvenskan, which was the beginning of the golden era of Åtvidabergs FF. He remained coach of the club until 1970, when the team defeated Sandvikens IF from Uppsala with 2–0 in the cup final and won its first national title. Until 1973 three more titles should follow. Players like Conny Torstensson and Benno Magnusson are amongst the better known ones which Gustavsson integrated into the time during his time in Åtvidaberg.

From 1971 to 1972, Gustavsson had a brief spell as coach of the Swedish national youth team. In further years he was to coach Östers IF from 1973 to 1974, from 1975 to 1978 and in 1985 as assistant IFK Norrköping, from 1979 until 1981 Hammarby IF and from 1982 to 1983 second division side IK Sleipner, which was relegated in 1983.

== Honours ==
As player:

- World Cup: Finalist 1958
- Swedish Championship: 1948, 1952, 1956
- Swedish Player of the Year: 1953

As manager:

- Swedish Cup: 1970
- Promotion to first division: 1967
