= Mel Hopkins =

Welsh footballer

Personal information
- Full name: Melvyn Hopkins
- Date of birth: 7 November 1934
- Place of birth: Ystrad, Rhondda, Wales
- Date of death: 18 October 2010 (aged 75)
- Place of death: Worthing, England
- Position: Full-back

Senior career*
Years	Team	Apps	(Gls)
1952–1964	Tottenham Hotspur	219	(0)
1964–1967	Brighton & Hove Albion	58	(2)
1967–1969	Canterbury City		
1969–1970	Bradford Park Avenue	30	(0)
Total		307+	(2)

International career
1956–1963	Wales	34	(0)
- * Club domestic league appearances and goals

Mel Hopkins (7 November 1934 – 18 October 2010) was a Welsh international footballer. He played at left back.

== Club career ==
The son of a miner, he was signed by Tottenham Hotspur at the age of 15, when spotted playing for his local boy's club. He was taken on as an apprentice after just one trial. Mel Hopkins made his debut in January 1952 and winning a League and FA Cup double in 1961. In 1959, he suffered a serious injury following a collision with Ian St John, smashing his nose and upper jaw, an injury which would keep him out of football for two years.

In total, Hopkins played 219 games for Spurs, before leaving Spurs for Brighton and Hove Albion in October 1964 for a transfer fee of £8,000. He scored 2 goals and played 58 games for Albion. A brief spell at Ballymena United in Northern Ireland 1967 was followed by a move to Bradford Park Avenue in January 1969, where he played 30 games, retiring in 1970.

== International career ==
Hopkins played for his country between 1956 and 1963, earning 34 caps including playing for the Wales squad for the 1958 FIFA World Cup in Sweden, where they lost narrowly to Brazil in the quarter-finals.

In 2003, Hopkins was given a merit award by the Football Association of Wales.
