= Dave Bowen =

Welsh football player and manager (1928–1995)

Personal information
- Full name: David Lloyd Bowen
- Date of birth: 7 June 1928
- Place of birth: Maesteg, Wales
- Date of death: 25 September 1995 (aged 67)
- Place of death: Northampton, England
- Position: Wing half

Senior career*
| Years | Team | Apps | (Gls) |
| 1947–1950 | Northampton Town | 12 | (0) |
| 1950–1959 | Arsenal | 146 | (2) |
| 1959–1960 | Northampton Town | 22 | (1) |
| Total | | 180 | (3) |

International career
| 1954–1959 | Wales | 19 | (1) |

Managerial career
- 1959–1967: Northampton Town
- 1969–1972: Northampton Town
- 1964–1974: Wales
- 1978: Northampton Town
- * Club domestic league appearances and goals

David Lloyd Bowen (7 June 1928 – 25 September 1995) was a Welsh football player and manager, who captained his country to their first ever World Cup finals, in 1958.

== Playing career ==
Born in Maesteg, Bowen first played for Northampton Town. He had only played 12 times for Northampton before catching the eye of Pat Whittaker, son of Arsenal manager Tom Whittaker. He was duly signed by Arsenal in the summer of 1950 as an understudy to Joe Mercer at wing half. He made his debut against Wolves on 24 March 1951, but only made a handful of appearances between 1951 and 1954, when Mercer finally retired due to injury. Arsenal won the old First Division in 1952–53 but he only made two league appearances all season. In 1954–55 Bowen became a regular in the Arsenal side, and would continue to be for the rest of the decade.

In the meantime, Bowen had also made his debut for Wales, in a friendly against Yugoslavia in September 1954. Bowen went on to win 19 caps for Wales, and was the team's captain for their 1958 FIFA World Cup campaign; Wales drew all three of their group matches and qualified for the quarter-finals, where they were beaten 1–0 by Brazil, the goalscorer being a 17-year-old Pelé. Along with goalkeeper Jack Kelsey, Bowen was the first Arsenal player to play in a World Cup.

Bowen's spell at Arsenal coincided with a lack of success at the club, so he did not win any major domestic honours. However, he did play for a London XI in the 1955–58 final of the Inter-Cities Fairs Cup (forerunner of the UEFA Cup), losing 8–2 on aggregate to FC Barcelona, and was Arsenal captain in his final two seasons. In all he played 162 matches for the club, scoring twice.

== Managerial career ==
In 1959, Bowen returned to Northampton Town as player-manager. Bowen would manage the Cobblers for eight years, and became known as a canny manager who signed quality players despite a tight budget. He steered Northampton from the Fourth Division to the First in just five seasons. However, the club spent only one season (1965–66) at the top, before being relegated.

Bowen left Northampton in 1967, after a second successive relegation, though he rejoined the club for a second stint as manager between 1969 and 1972, by which time they had returned to the Fourth Division. He was in charge during the club's famous 8–2 FA Cup defeat at the hands of Manchester United in 1970, in which George Best scored six times.

In the meantime, he had also been manager of Wales between 1964 and 1974, although the side never did reach the heights it had when he was a player. Wales however did gain a 1–1 draw away to England in the 1974 World Cup qualifiers. Bowen continued to stay with Northampton, serving as general manager, secretary and finally as a club director before retiring. He also had a sideline in journalism and bookmaking during his managerial career and was a summariser for ITV alongside commentator Hugh Johns for their coverage of the 1966 World Cup final.

== Managerial statistics ==
As of match played 29 April 2022

Managerial record by team and tenure
| Team | From | To | Record | | | | |
| Team | From | To | P | W | D | L | Win % |
|---|---|---|---|---|---|---|---|
| Northampton Town | 1 July 1959 | 1 September 1967 | 387 | 165 | 89 | 133 | 42.6 |
| Wales | 1 October 1964 | 31 May 1974 | 53 | 10 | 13 | 30 | 18.9 |
| Northampton Town | 1 May 1969 | 1 May 1972 | 161 | 54 | 48 | 59 | 33.5 |
| Northampton Town | 10 January 1978 | 1 February 1978 | 6 | 3 | 1 | 2 | 50.0 |
| Total | | | 610 | 233 | 151 | 226 | 38.20 |

== Personal life ==
He died in Northampton in 1995, at the age of 67. The North Stand of Northampton's Sixfields Stadium is named in his honour, as is a residential street in Duston. His son Keith also became a footballer.
