= 1962 FIFA World Cup qualification (UEFA) =

Tournament details
- Dates: 19 October 1960 - 29 November 1961
- Teams: 30 (from 2 confederations)

Tournament statistics
- Matches played: 51
- Goals scored: 216 (4.24 per match)
- Attendance: 2,252,076 (44,158 per match)
- Top scorer: (Czechoslovakia) Andrej Kvašňák (7 goals)

The European section of the 1962 FIFA World Cup qualification functioned as the qualifiers for the 1962 World Cup, which took place in Chile. For an overview of the qualification rounds, see the article 1962 FIFA World Cup qualification.

In addition to 29 UEFA teams, 1 CAF team (Ethiopia) competed in the UEFA section.

== Format ==
The 30 teams were divided into 10 groups. The groups had different rules, as follows:

- Groups 1, 2, 3, 4, 5, 6 and 8 had 3 teams each. The teams played against each other on a home-and-away basis. The group winners would qualify.
- Group 7 had 5 teams. The teams played in a knockout tournament, with matches on a home-and-away basis. The group winner would qualify. This was a special group which included two UEFA countries located geographically in Asia (Cyprus and Israel) and one CAF country located in Africa (Ethiopia), in addition to two European UEFA teams (Romania who withdrew without playing any games, and Italy who won the group.)
- Group 9 had 2 teams. The teams played against each other on a home-and-away basis. The group winner would advance to the UEFA / CAF Intercontinental Play-off.
- Group 10 had 2 teams. The teams played against each other on a home-and-away basis. The group winner would advance to the UEFA / AFC Intercontinental Play-off.

== Groups ==
=== Group 1 ===
| Pos | Team | Pld | W | D | L | GF | GA | GD | Pts | Qualification | Sweden men's national football team | Switzerland national football team | Belgium national football team |
|---|---|---|---|---|---|---|---|---|---|---|---|---|---|
| 1 | Sweden | 4 | 3 | 0 | 1 | 10 | 3 | +7 | 6 | Teams finished on level points and played a play-off on a neutral ground | — | 4–0 | 2–0 |
| 2 | Switzerland | 4 | 3 | 0 | 1 | 9 | 9 | 0 | 6 | Teams finished on level points and played a play-off on a neutral ground | 3–2 | — | 2–1 |
| 3 | Belgium | 4 | 0 | 0 | 4 | 3 | 10 | −7 | 0 | | 0–2 | 2–4 | — |

Source: FIFA
- Switzerland won a playoff on a neutral ground.

=== Group 2 ===
| Pos | Team | Pld | W | D | L | GF | GA | GD | Pts | Qualification | France national football team | Bulgaria national football team | Finland national football team |
|---|---|---|---|---|---|---|---|---|---|---|---|---|---|
| 1 | France | 4 | 3 | 0 | 1 | 10 | 3 | +7 | 6 | Teams finished on level points and played a play-off on a neutral ground | — | 3–0 | 5–1 |
| 2 | Bulgaria | 4 | 3 | 0 | 1 | 6 | 4 | +2 | 6 | Teams finished on level points and played a play-off on a neutral ground | 1–0 | — | 3–1 |
| 3 | Finland | 4 | 0 | 0 | 4 | 3 | 12 | −9 | 0 | | 1–2 | 0–2 | — |

Source: FIFA
- Bulgaria won a playoff on a neutral ground.

=== Group 3 ===
| Pos | Team | Pld | W | D | L | GF | GA | GD | Pts | Qualification | Germany national football team | Northern Ireland national football team | Greece national football team |
|---|---|---|---|---|---|---|---|---|---|---|---|---|---|
| 1 | West Germany | 4 | 4 | 0 | 0 | 11 | 5 | +6 | 8 | Qualification to 1962 FIFA World Cup | — | 2–1 | 2–1 |
| 2 | Northern Ireland | 4 | 1 | 0 | 3 | 7 | 8 | −1 | 2 | | 3–4 | — | 2–0 |
| 3 | Greece | 4 | 1 | 0 | 3 | 3 | 8 | −5 | 2 | | 0–3 | 2–1 | — |

Source: FIFA

=== Group 4 ===
| Pos | Team | Pld | W | D | L | GF | GA | GD | Pts | Qualification | Hungary national football team | Netherlands national football team | East Germany national football team |
|---|---|---|---|---|---|---|---|---|---|---|---|---|---|
| 1 | Hungary | 4 | 3 | 1 | 0 | 11 | 5 | +6 | 7 | Qualification to 1962 FIFA World Cup | — | 3–3 | 2–0 |
| 2 | Netherlands | 3 | 0 | 2 | 1 | 4 | 7 | −3 | 2 | | 0–3 | — | – |
| 3 | East Germany | 3 | 0 | 1 | 2 | 3 | 6 | −3 | 1 | | 2–3 | 1–1 | — |

Source: FIFA

=== Group 5 ===
| Pos | Team | Pld | W | D | L | GF | GA | GD | Pts | Qualification | Soviet Union national football team | Turkey national football team | Norway national football team |
|---|---|---|---|---|---|---|---|---|---|---|---|---|---|
| 1 | Soviet Union | 4 | 4 | 0 | 0 | 11 | 3 | +8 | 8 | Qualification to 1962 FIFA World Cup | — | 1–0 | 5–2 |
| 2 | Turkey | 4 | 2 | 0 | 2 | 4 | 4 | 0 | 4 | | 1–2 | — | 2–1 |
| 3 | Norway | 4 | 0 | 0 | 4 | 3 | 11 | −8 | 0 | | 0–3 | 0–1 | — |

Source: FIFA

=== Group 6 ===
| Pos | Team | Pld | W | D | L | GF | GA | GD | Pts | Qualification | England national football team | Portugal national football team | Luxembourg national football team |
|---|---|---|---|---|---|---|---|---|---|---|---|---|---|
| 1 | England | 4 | 3 | 1 | 0 | 16 | 2 | +14 | 7 | Qualification to 1962 FIFA World Cup | — | 2–0 | 4–1 |
| 2 | Portugal | 4 | 1 | 1 | 2 | 9 | 7 | +2 | 3 | | 1–1 | — | 6–0 |
| 3 | Luxembourg | 4 | 1 | 0 | 3 | 5 | 21 | −16 | 2 | | 0–9 | 4–2 | — |

Source: FIFA

=== Group 7 ===
First Round
Israel | 1 | 6 | 7
Cyprus | 1 | 1 | 2

Second Round
Italy | w/o
Romania (withdrew)
Ethiopia | 0 | 2 | 2
Israel | 1 | 3 | 4

Final Round
Italy | 4 | 6 | 10
Israel | 2 | 0 | 2

=== Group 8 ===
| Pos | Team | Pld | W | D | L | GF | GA | GD | Pts | Qualification | Czechoslovakia national football team | Scotland national football team | Republic of Ireland national football team |
|---|---|---|---|---|---|---|---|---|---|---|---|---|---|
| 1 | Czechoslovakia | 4 | 3 | 0 | 1 | 16 | 5 | +11 | 6 | Teams finished on level points and played a play-off on a neutral ground | — | 4–0 | 7–1 |
| 2 | Scotland | 4 | 3 | 0 | 1 | 10 | 7 | +3 | 6 | Teams finished on level points and played a play-off on a neutral ground | 3–2 | — | 4–1 |
| 3 | Republic of Ireland | 4 | 0 | 0 | 4 | 3 | 17 | −14 | 0 | | 1–3 | 0–3 | — |

Source: FIFA
- Czechoslovakia won a playoff on a neutral ground.

=== Group 9 ===
| Pos | Team | Pld | W | D | L | GF | GA | GD | Pts | Qualification | Spain national football team | Wales national football team |
|---|---|---|---|---|---|---|---|---|---|---|---|---|
| 1 | Spain | 2 | 1 | 1 | 0 | 3 | 2 | +1 | 3 | Advanced to the CAF–UEFA play-off | — | 1–1 |
| 2 | Wales | 2 | 0 | 1 | 1 | 2 | 3 | −1 | 1 | | 1–2 | — |

Source: FIFA

=== Group 10 ===
| Pos | Team | Pld | W | D | L | GF | GA | GD | Pts | Qualification | Yugoslavia national football team | Poland national football team |
|---|---|---|---|---|---|---|---|---|---|---|---|---|
| 1 | Yugoslavia | 2 | 1 | 1 | 0 | 3 | 2 | +1 | 3 | Advanced to the UEFA–AFC play-off | — | 2–1 |
| 2 | Poland | 2 | 0 | 1 | 1 | 2 | 3 | −1 | 1 | | 1–1 | — |

Source: FIFA

== Inter-confederation play-offs ==
=== CAF v UEFA ===
| Pos | Team | Pld | W | D | L | GF | GA | GD | Pts | Qualification | (Spain) | (Morocco) |
|---|---|---|---|---|---|---|---|---|---|---|---|---|
| 1 | Spain | 2 | 2 | 0 | 0 | 4 | 2 | +2 | 4 | 1962 FIFA World Cup | — | 3–2 |
| 2 | Morocco | 2 | 0 | 0 | 2 | 2 | 4 | −2 | 0 | | 0–1 | — |

Source: RSSSF

=== UEFA v AFC ===
| Pos | Team | Pld | W | D | L | GF | GA | GD | Pts | Qualification | (Socialist Federal Republic of Yugoslavia) | (South Korea) |
|---|---|---|---|---|---|---|---|---|---|---|---|---|
| 1 | Yugoslavia | 2 | 2 | 0 | 0 | 8 | 2 | +6 | 4 | 1962 FIFA World Cup | — | 5–1 |
| 2 | South Korea | 2 | 0 | 0 | 2 | 2 | 8 | −6 | 0 | | 1–3 | — |

Source: RSSSF

== Qualified teams ==
The following 10 countries qualified for the 1962 FIFA World Cup

| Team | Qualified as | Qualified on | Previous appearances in FIFA World Cup^{1} |
|---|---|---|---|
| Switzerland | Group 1 winners | 12 November 1961 | 4 (1934, 1938, 1950, 1954) |
| Bulgaria | Group 2 winners | 16 December 1961 | 0 (debut) |
| West Germany | Group 3 winners | 22 October 1961 | 4 (1934^{2}, 1938^{2}, **1954**, 1958) |
| Hungary | Group 4 winners | 22 October 1961 | 4 (1934, 1938, 1954, 1958) |
| Soviet Union | Group 5 winners | 12 November 1961 | 1 (1958) |
| England | Group 6 winners | 25 October 1961 | 3 (1950, (1954, 1958) |
| Italy | Group 7 winners | 4 November 1961 | 4 (**1934**, **1938**, 1950, 1954) |
| Czechoslovakia | Group 8 winners | 29 November 1961 | 4 (1934, 1938, 1954, 1958) |
| Spain | CAF-UEFA playoff winners | 23 November 1961 | 2 (1934, 1950) |
| Yugoslavia | UEFA-AFC playoff winners | 26 November 1961 | 4 (1930, 1950, 1954, 1958) |

^{1} Bold indicates champions for that year. Italic indicates hosts for that year.
^{2}Competed as Germany

== Goalscorers ==
There were 216 goals scored in 51 matches, for an average of 4.24 goals per match.

7 goals

- (Czechoslovakia) Andrej Kvašňák

5 goals

- (Czechoslovakia) Adolf Scherer
- (England) Bobby Charlton
- (Sweden) Yngve Brodd
- (Switzerland) Charles Antenen

4 goals

- (Czechoslovakia) Tomáš Pospíchal
- (Israel) Nahum Stelmach
- (Italy) Omar Sivori
- (Portugal) Yaúca
- (Socialist Federal Republic of Yugoslavia) Milan Galić

3 goals

- (England) Jimmy Greaves
- (France) Maryan Wisnieski
- (Greece) Andreas Papaemmanouil
- (Hungary) Lajos Tichy
- (Israel) Yehoshua Glazer
- (Israel) Shlomo Levi
- (Italy) Mario Corso
- (Luxembourg) Ady Schmit
- (Northern Ireland) Billy McAdams
- (Scotland) Ralph Brand
- (Scotland) Ian St. John
- (Sweden) Rune Börjesson
- (Turkey) Metin Oktay
- (West Germany) Albert Brülls
- (West Germany) Gert Dörfel
- (West Germany) Uwe Seeler

2 goals

- (Bulgaria) Hristo Iliev
- (Bulgaria) Dimitar Yakimov
- (Cyprus) Michalis Shialis
- (East Germany) Dieter Erler
- (England) Ray Pointer
- (England) Bobby Smith
- (Finland) Kai Pahlman
- (France) Jacques Faivre
- (Hungary) János Göröcs
- (Hungary) Károly Sándor
- (Netherlands) Henk Groot
- (Netherlands) Tonny van der Linden
- (Northern Ireland) Jimmy McIlroy
- (Northern Ireland) Jim McLaughlin
- (Portugal) José Águas
- (Scotland) David Herd
- (Scotland) Denis Law
- (Scotland) Alex Young
- (Soviet Union) Valentin Bubukin
- (Soviet Union) Mikheil Meskhi
- (Soviet Union) Slava Metreveli
- (Soviet Union) Viktor Ponedelnik
- (Spain) Alfredo Di Stéfano
- (Sweden) Agne Simonsson
- (Switzerland) Robert Ballaman
- (Switzerland) Heinz Schneiter
- (Socialist Federal Republic of Yugoslavia) Dragoslav Šekularac

1 goal

- (Belgium) Roger Claessen
- (Belgium) Paul Van Himst
- (Belgium) Marcel Paeschen
- (Bulgaria) Todor Diev
- (Bulgaria) Ivan Petkov Kolev
- (Bulgaria) Petar Velichkov
- (Czechoslovakia) Jiří Hledík
- (Czechoslovakia) Josef Jelínek
- (Czechoslovakia) Josef Kadraba
- (Czechoslovakia) Josef Masopust
- (East Germany) Peter Ducke
- (England) John Connelly
- (England) Ron Flowers
- (England) Johnny Haynes
- (England) Dennis Viollet
- (Ethiopia) Mohammed Awad
- (Ethiopia) Luciano Vassalo
- (Finland) Sauli Pietiläinen
- (France) Lucien Cossou
- (France) Jean-Jacques Marcel
- (France) Roger Piantoni
- (France) Ernest Schultz
- (France) Joseph Ujlaki
- (Hungary) Flórián Albert
- (Hungary) Máté Fenyvesi
- (Hungary) Tivadar Monostori
- (Hungary) Ernő Solymosi
- (Republic of Ireland) Amby Fogarty
- (Republic of Ireland) Johnny Giles
- (Republic of Ireland) Joe Haverty
- (Israel) Boaz Kofman
- (Israel) Shlomo Nahari
- (Israel) Reuven Young
- (Italy) José Altafini
- (Italy) Antonio Angelillo
- (Italy) Francisco Lojacono
- (Luxembourg) Camille Dimmer
- (Luxembourg) Nicolas Hoffmann
- (Norway) Bjørn Borgen
- (Norway) Eldar Hansen
- (Norway) Roald Jensen
- (Poland) Lucjan Brychczy
- (Poland) Jan Szmidt
- (Portugal) Mário Coluna
- (Portugal) Eusébio
- (Soviet Union) Gennadi Gusarov
- (Soviet Union) Aleksei Mamykin
- (Soviet Union) Valery Voronin
- (Spain) Enrique Collar
- (Spain) Marcelino
- (Spain) Joaquín Peiró
- (Spain) Alfonso Rodríguez Salas
- (Spain) Luis del Sol
- (Sweden) Torbjörn Jonsson
- (Switzerland) Norbert Eschmann
- (Switzerland) Rolf Wüthrich
- (Turkey) Aydın Yelken
- (Wales) Ivor Allchurch
- (Wales) Phil Woosnam
- (West Germany) Helmut Haller
- (West Germany) Richard Kreß
- (Socialist Federal Republic of Yugoslavia) Zvezdan Čebinac
- (Socialist Federal Republic of Yugoslavia) Dražan Jerković
- (Socialist Federal Republic of Yugoslavia) Tomislav Kaloperović
- (Socialist Federal Republic of Yugoslavia) Bora Kostić
- (Socialist Federal Republic of Yugoslavia) Petar Radaković

1 own goal

- (Luxembourg) Fernand Brosius (playing against Portugal)
