= 1962 FIFA World Cup qualification =

Tournament details
- Dates: 21 August 1960 – 16 December 1961
- Teams: 56 (from 6 confederations)

Tournament statistics
- Matches played: 92
- Goals scored: 323 (3.51 per match)
- Top scorer(s): (Czechoslovakia) Andrej Kvašňák (7 goals)

A total of 56 teams entered the 1962 FIFA World Cup qualification rounds, competing for a total of 16 spots in the final tournament. Chile, as the hosts, and Brazil, as the defending champions, qualified automatically, leaving 14 spots open for competition.

As with previous World Cups, the rules of the qualification rounds varied by confederation. The winners of the four weakest continental zones: North America (NAFC), Central America and Caribbean (CCCF), Africa (CAF) and Asia (AFC), were not guaranteed direct spots in the final tournament. Instead, they entered a play-off against a team from either Europe (UEFA) or South America (CONMEBOL), with the winners of the three play-offs qualifying.

== Format ==
The 16 spots available in the 1962 World Cup would be distributed among the continental zones as follows:

- Europe (UEFA): 8 direct places + 2 spots in the Intercontinental Play-offs (against teams from CAF and AFC), contested by 30 teams (including Israel and Ethiopia).
- South America (CONMEBOL): 5 direct places + 1 spot in the Intercontinental Play-offs (against a team from CCCF/NAFC); 2 direct places went to automatic qualifiers Chile and Brazil, while the other 3.5 places were contested by 7 teams.
- North, Central America and Caribbean (CCCF/NAFC): 1 spot in the Intercontinental Play-offs (against a team from CONMEBOL), contested by 8 teams.
- Africa (CAF): 1 spot in the Intercontinental Play-offs (against a team from UEFA), contested by 6 teams.
- Asia (AFC): 1 spot in the Intercontinental Play-offs (against a team from UEFA), contested by 3 teams.

A total of 49 teams played at least one qualifying match. A total of 92 qualifying matches were played, and 323 goals were scored (an average of 3.51 per match).

Listed below are the dates and results of the qualification rounds.

== Confederation qualification ==
=== AFC ===
There would be only one round of play. The 3 teams played against each other on a home-and-away basis. The group winner would advance to the UEFA/AFC Intercontinental Play-off.

Pos	Team	Pld	Pts
1	South Korea	2	4
2	Japan	2	0
3	Indonesia	0	0

Source: RSSSF

=== CAF ===
There would be two rounds of play:

- First round: The 6 teams were divided into 3 groups of 2 teams each. The teams played against each other on a home-and-away basis. The group winners would advance to the Final Round.
- Final round: The 3 teams played against each other on a home-and-away basis. The group winner would advance to the UEFA/CAF Intercontinental Play-off.

==== First round ====
Group 1
Sudan and the United Arab Republic both withdrew; the Group was scratched.
Group 2

Pos	Team	Pld	Pts
1	Morocco	2	2
2	Tunisia	2	2

Source: RSSSF
Group 3

Pos	Team	Pld	Pts
1	Ghana	2	3
2	Nigeria	2	1

Source: RSSSF

==== Second round ====
Second round

Pos	Team	Pld	Pts
1	Morocco	2	3
2	Ghana	2	1

Source: RSSSF

=== CCCF and NAFC ===
There would be two rounds of play:

- First Round: The remaining 7 teams (Canada withdrew before the matches began due to scheduling constraints) were divided into 3 groups of 2 or 3 teams each (Group 1 with teams from Northern America and Mexico, Group 2 with teams from Central America and Group 3 with teams from Caribbean). The teams played against each other on a home-and-away basis. The group winners would advance to the Final Round.
- Final Round: The 3 teams played against each other on a home-and-away basis. The group winner would advance to the CONMEBOL/CCCF/NAFC Intercontinental Play-off.

==== First round ====
Group 1

Pos	Team	Pld	Pts
1	Mexico	2	3
2	United States	2	1

Source: FIFA
Group 2

Pos	Team	Pld	Pts
1	Costa Rica	4	5
2	Honduras	4	5
3	Guatemala	4	2

Source: FIFA
Group 3

Pos	Team	Pld	Pts
1	Netherlands Antilles	2	3
2	Suriname	2	1

Source: FIFA

==== Second round ====
Second round

Pos	Team	Pld	Pts
1	Mexico	4	5
2	Costa Rica	4	4
3	Netherlands Antilles	4	3

Source: FIFA

=== CONMEBOL ===
Among the 7 teams, Paraguay were drawn to play in the CCCF/NAFC–CONMEBOL Intercontinental Play-off. The remaining 6 teams were divided into 3 groups of 2 teams each. The teams played against each other on a home-and-away basis. The group winners would qualify.

Group 1

Pos	Team	Pld	Pts
1	Argentina	2	4
2	Ecuador	2	0

Source: FIFA
Group 2

Pos	Team	Pld	Pts
1	Uruguay	2	3
2	Bolivia	2	1

Source: FIFA
Group 3

Pos	Team	Pld	Pts
1	Colombia	2	3
2	Peru	2	1

Source: FIFA

=== UEFA ===
The 30 teams were divided into 10 groups. The groups had different rules, as follows:

- Groups 1, 2, 3, 4, 5, 6 and 8 had 3 teams each. The teams played against each other on a home-and-away basis. The group winners would qualify. If the top two teams finished on level points, then a play-off at a neutral ground determined the final qualifier.
- Group 7 had 5 teams. The teams played in a knockout tournament, with matches on a home-and-away basis. The group winner would qualify.
- Group 9 had 2 teams. The teams played against each other on a home-and-away basis. The group winner would advance to the UEFA / CAF Intercontinental Play-off. If the top two teams finished on level points, then a play-off at a neutral ground determined the final qualifier.
- Group 10 had 2 teams. The teams played against each other on a home-and-away basis. The group winner would advance to the UEFA / AFC Intercontinental Play-off. If the top two teams finished on level points, then a play-off at a neutral ground determined the final qualifier.

Group 1
Group 2
Group 3

Pos	Team	Pld	Pts
1	Sweden	4	6
2	Switzerland	4	6
3	Belgium	4	0

Source: FIFA

Pos	Team	Pld	Pts
1	France	4	6
2	Bulgaria	4	6
3	Finland	4	0

Source: FIFA

Pos	Team	Pld	Pts
1	West Germany	4	8
2	Northern Ireland	4	2
3	Greece	4	2

Source: FIFA
Group 4
Group 5
Group 6

Pos	Team	Pld	Pts
1	Hungary	4	7
2	Netherlands	3	2
3	East Germany	3	1

Source: FIFA

Pos	Team	Pld	Pts
1	Soviet Union	4	8
2	Turkey	4	4
3	Norway	4	0

Source: FIFA

Pos	Team	Pld	Pts
1	England	4	7
2	Portugal	4	3
3	Luxembourg	4	2

Source: FIFA
Group 8
Group 9
Group 10

Pos	Team	Pld	Pts
1	Czechoslovakia	4	6
2	Scotland	4	6
3	Republic of Ireland	4	0

Source: FIFA

Pos	Team	Pld	Pts
1	Spain	2	3
2	Wales	2	1

Source: FIFA

Pos	Team	Pld	Pts
1	Yugoslavia	2	3
2	Poland	2	1

Source: FIFA

Group 7

First Round
Israel	1	6	7
Cyprus	1	1	2

Second Round
Italy	w/o
Romania (withdrew)
Ethiopia	0	2	2
Israel	1	3	4

Final Round
Italy	4	6	10
Israel	2	0	2

== Inter-confederation play-offs ==
In each play-off, the teams played against each other on a home-and-away basis. The winners would qualify.

=== CAF v UEFA ===
Pos	Team	Pld	W	D	L	GF	GA	GD	Pts	Qualification	(Spain)	(Morocco)
1	Spain	2	2	0	0	4	2	+2	4	1962 FIFA World Cup	—	3–2
2	Morocco	2	0	0	2	2	4	−2	0		0–1	—

Source: RSSSF

=== UEFA v AFC ===
Pos	Team	Pld	W	D	L	GF	GA	GD	Pts	Qualification	(Socialist Federal Republic of Yugoslavia)	(South Korea)
1	Yugoslavia	2	2	0	0	8	2	+6	4	1962 FIFA World Cup	—	5–1
2	South Korea	2	0	0	2	2	8	−6	0		1–3	—

Source: RSSSF

=== CCCF/NAFC v CONMEBOL ===
Pos	Team	Pld	W	D	L	GF	GA	GD	Pts	Qualification	(Mexico)	(Paraguay)
1	Mexico	2	1	1	0	1	0	+1	3	1962 FIFA World Cup	—	1–0
2	Paraguay	2	0	1	1	0	1	−1	1		0–0	—

Source: RSSSF

== Qualified teams ==
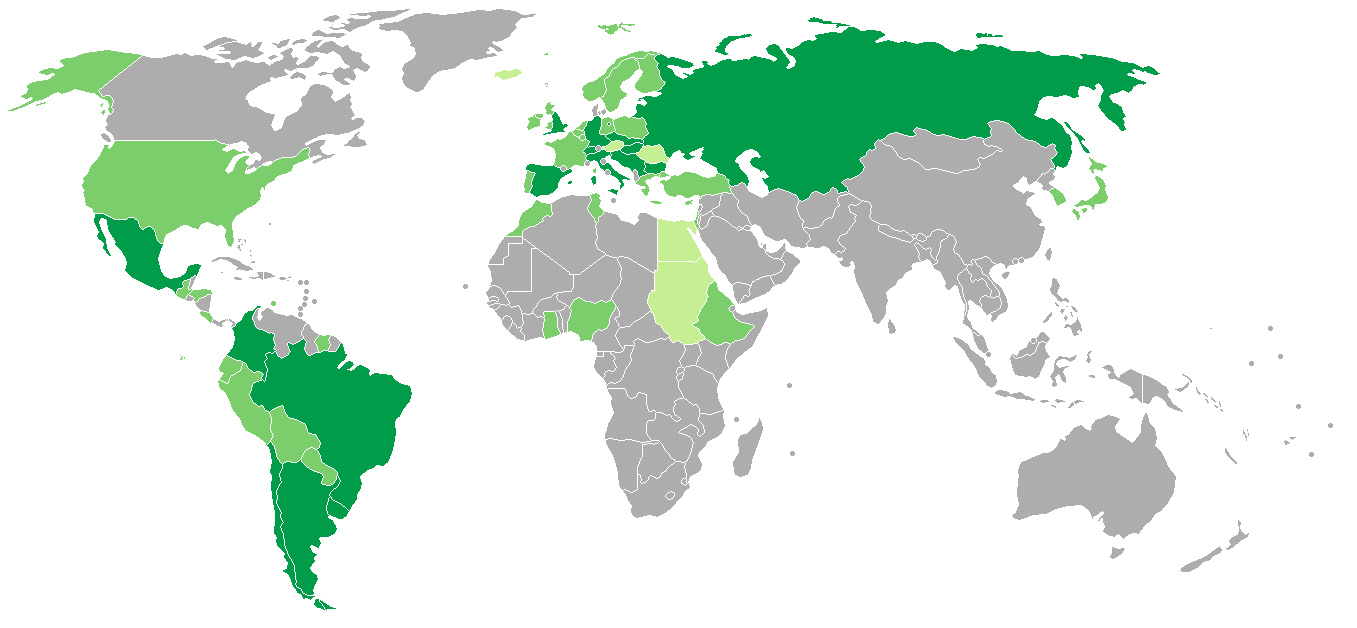
FIFA World Cup qualification 1962

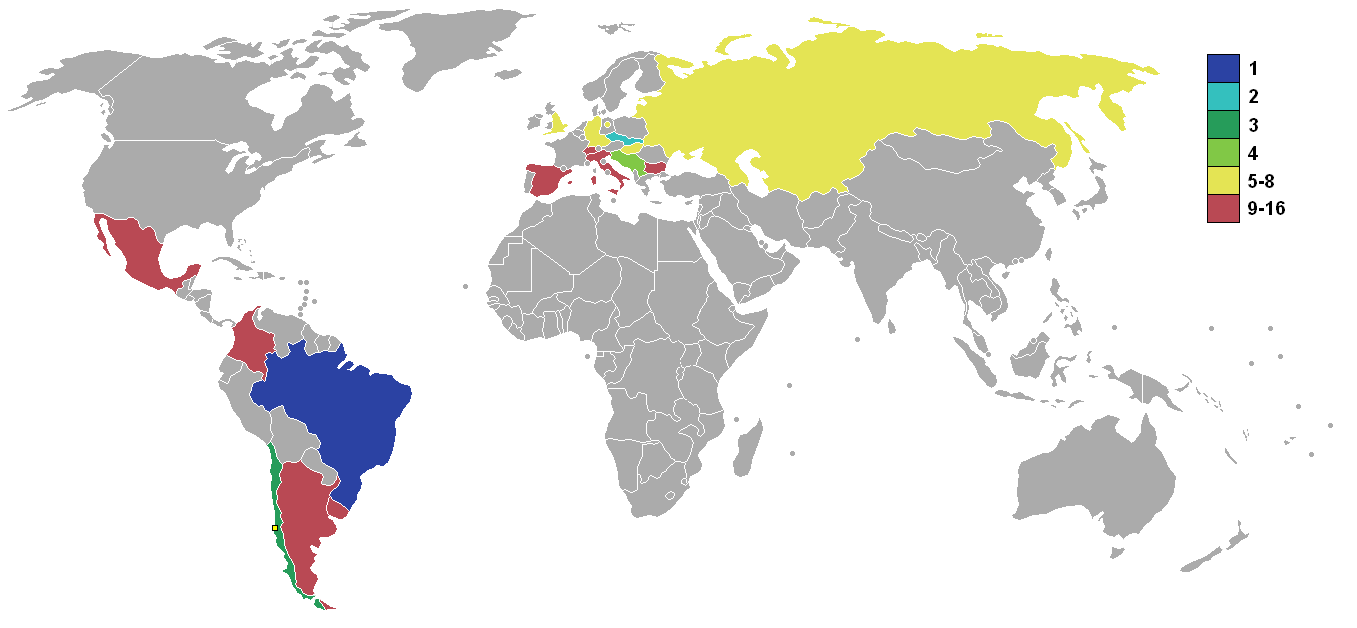
Qualifying countries

Team	Date of qualification	Finals appearance	Streak	Last appearance
Argentina	17 December 1960	4th	2	1958
Brazil (defending champions)	29 June 1958	7th	7	1958
Bulgaria	16 December 1961	1st	1	—
Chile (hosts)	11 June 1956	3rd	1	1950
Colombia	7 May 1961	1st	1	—
Czechoslovakia	29 November 1961	5th	3	1958
England	25 October 1961	4th	4	1958
Hungary	10 September 1961	5th	3	1958
Italy	4 November 1961	5th	1	1954
Mexico	5 November 1961	5th	4	1958
Spain	23 November 1961	3rd	1	1950
Switzerland	12 November 1961	5th	1	1954
Uruguay	30 July 1961	4th	1	1954
Soviet Union	12 November 1961	2nd	2	1958
West Germany	22 October 1961	5th	3	1958
Yugoslavia	26 November 1961	5th	4	1958

== Goalscorers ==
7 goals

- (Czechoslovakia) Andrej Kvašňák

6 goals

- (Costa Rica) Juan Ulloa
- (Mexico) Salvador Reyes Monteón

5 goals

- (Czechoslovakia) Adolf Scherer
- (England) Bobby Charlton
- (Sweden) Yngve Brodd
- (Switzerland) Charles Antenen

4 goals

- (Costa Rica) Rubén Jiménez
- (Costa Rica) Marvin Rodríguez
- (Czechoslovakia) Tomáš Pospíchal
- (Guatemala) Francisco López Contreras
- (Israel) Nahum Stelmach
- (Italy) Omar Sivori
- (Mexico) Francisco Flores
- (Portugal) Yaúca
- (South Korea) Chung Soon-cheon
- (Socialist Federal Republic of Yugoslavia) Milan Galić

3 goals

- (Argentina) Oreste Omar Corbatta
- (England) Jimmy Greaves
- (France) Maryan Wisnieski
- (Ghana) Edward Acquah
- (Greece) Andreas Papaemmanouil
- (Hungary) Lajos Tichy
- (Israel) Yehoshua Glazer
- (Israel) Shlomo Levi
- (Italy) Mario Corso
- (Luxembourg) Ady Schmit
- (Mexico) Sigfrido Mercado
- (Morocco) Abdallah Azhar
- (Northern Ireland) Billy McAdams
- (Scotland) Ralph Brand
- (Scotland) Ian St. John
- (Sweden) Rune Börjesson
- (Turkey) Metin Oktay
- (West Germany) Albert Brülls
- (West Germany) Gert Dörfel
- (West Germany) Uwe Seeler

2 goals

- (Argentina) Martín Pando
- (Argentina) José Francisco Sanfilippo
- (Argentina) Rubén Héctor Sosa
- (Bulgaria) Hristo Iliev
- (Bulgaria) Dimitar Yakimov
- (Costa Rica) Manrique Quesada
- (Cyprus) Michalis Shialis
- (East Germany) Dieter Erler
- (Ecuador) Carlos Alberto Raffo
- (England) Ray Pointer
- (England) Bobby Smith
- (Finland) Kai Pahlman
- (France) Jacques Faivre
- (Guatemala) Augusto Espinoza
- (Honduras) Carlos Humberto Suazo
- (Hungary) János Göröcs
- (Hungary) Károly Sándor
- (Mexico) Eduardo González Palmer
- (Morocco) Mohamed Khalfi
- (Netherlands) Henk Groot
- (Netherlands) Tonny van der Linden
- (Netherlands Antilles) Eduvigis Rudolfo Dirksz
- (Netherlands Antilles) Edwin Miliano Loran
- (Nigeria) Dejo Fayemi
- (Northern Ireland) Jimmy McIlroy
- (Northern Ireland) Jim McLaughlin
- (Portugal) José Águas
- (Scotland) David Herd
- (Scotland) Denis Law
- (Scotland) Alex Young
- (South Korea) Yoo Pan-soon
- (Soviet Union) Valentin Bubukin
- (Soviet Union) Mikheil Meskhi
- (Soviet Union) Slava Metreveli
- (Soviet Union) Viktor Ponedelnik
- (Spain) Alfredo Di Stéfano
- (Sweden) Agne Simonsson
- (Switzerland) Robert Ballaman
- (Switzerland) Heinz Schneiter
- (Socialist Federal Republic of Yugoslavia) Dragoslav Šekularac

1 goal

- (Argentina) Ricardo José Maria Ramaciotti
- (Belgium) Roger Claessen
- (Belgium) Paul Van Himst
- (Belgium) Marcel Paeschen
- (Bolivia) Máximo Alcócer
- (Bolivia) Wilfredo Camacho
- (Bulgaria) Todor Diev
- (Bulgaria) Ivan Petkov Kolev
- (Bulgaria) Petar Velichkov
- (Colombia) Eusebio Escobar
- (Colombia) Héctor Garzon González
- (Costa Rica) Carlos Vivo Goban
- (Costa Rica) Álvaro Grant MacDonald
- (Costa Rica) Jorge Hernán Monge
- (Costa Rica) Walter Pearson
- (Costa Rica) Francisco Rojas
- (Costa Rica) Rigoberto Rojas
- (Czechoslovakia) Jiří Hledík
- (Czechoslovakia) Josef Jelínek
- (Czechoslovakia) Josef Kadraba
- (Czechoslovakia) Josef Masopust
- (East Germany) Peter Ducke
- (Ecuador) Alberto Spencer
- (England) John Connelly
- (England) Ron Flowers
- (England) Johnny Haynes
- (England) Dennis Viollet
- (Ethiopia) Mohammed Awad
- (Ethiopia) Luciano Vassalo
- (Finland) Sauli Pietiläinen
- (France) Lucien Cossou
- (France) Jean-Jacques Marcel
- (France) Roger Piantoni
- (France) Ernest Schultz
- (France) Joseph Ujlaki
- (Ghana) Edward Boateng
- (Ghana) Aggrey Fynn
- (Ghana) Mohamadu Salisu
- (Guatemala) Fred Masella
- (Honduras) Ronald Leaky
- (Hungary) Flórián Albert
- (Hungary) Máté Fenyvesi
- (Hungary) Tivadar Monostori
- (Hungary) Ernő Solymosi
- (Republic of Ireland) Amby Fogarty
- (Republic of Ireland) Johnny Giles
- (Republic of Ireland) Joe Haverty
- (Israel) Boaz Kofman
- (Israel) Shlomo Nahari
- (Israel) Reuven Young
- (Italy) José Altafini
- (Italy) Antonio Angelillo
- (Italy) Francisco Lojacono
- (Japan) Koji Sasaki
- (Luxembourg) Camille Dimmer
- (Luxembourg) Nicolas Hoffmann
- (Mexico) Raúl Cárdenas
- (Mexico) Isidoro Díaz
- (Mexico) Crescencio Gutiérrez
- (Morocco) Lahcen Chicha
- (Morocco) Sellam Riahi
- (Nigeria) Godwin Emenako
- (Norway) Bjørn Borgen
- (Norway) Eldar Hansen
- (Norway) Roald Jensen
- (Peru) Faustino Delgado
- (Poland) Lucjan Brychczy
- (Poland) Jan Szmidt
- (Portugal) Mário Coluna
- (Portugal) Eusébio
- (Soviet Union) Gennadi Gusarov
- (Soviet Union) Aleksei Mamykin
- (Soviet Union) Valery Voronin
- (Spain) Enrique Collar
- (Spain) Marcelino
- (Spain) Joaquín Peiró
- (Spain) Alfonso Rodríguez Salas
- (Spain) Luis del Sol
- (Suriname (Kingdom of the Netherlands)) August Foe a Man
- (Sweden) Torbjörn Jonsson
- (Switzerland) Norbert Eschmann
- (Switzerland) Rolf Wüthrich
- (Tunisia) Abdelmajid Chetali
- (Tunisia) Brahim Kerrit
- (Tunisia) Rached Meddeb
- (Tunisia) Abdelmajid Tlemçani
- (Turkey) Aydın Yelken
- (United States) Helmut Bicek
- (United States) Carl Fister
- (United States) Al Zerhusen
- (Uruguay) Ángel Cabrera
- (Uruguay) Luis Cubilla
- (Uruguay) Guillermo Escalada
- (Wales) Ivor Allchurch
- (Wales) Phil Woosnam
- (West Germany) Helmut Haller
- (West Germany) Richard Kreß
- (Socialist Federal Republic of Yugoslavia) Zvezdan Čebinac
- (Socialist Federal Republic of Yugoslavia) Dražan Jerković
- (Socialist Federal Republic of Yugoslavia) Tomislav Kaloperović
- (Socialist Federal Republic of Yugoslavia) Bora Kostić
- (Socialist Federal Republic of Yugoslavia) Petar Radaković

1 own goal

- (Ecuador) Romulo Gómez (playing against Argentina)
- (Luxembourg) Fernand Brosius (playing against Portugal)

== Notes ==
- For the second World Cup in a row, no teams from Africa or Asia qualified.
