= 1962 FIFA World Cup qualification – UEFA Group 2 =

Football tournament

The three teams in this group played against each other on a home-and-away basis. France and Bulgaria finished level on points and advanced to a play-off on neutral ground to decide who would qualify. The winner (Bulgaria) qualified for the 1962 FIFA World Cup held in Chile.

== Standings ==
Pos	Team	Pld	W	D	L	GF	GA	GD	Pts	Qualification	France national football team	Bulgaria national football team	Finland national football team
1	France	4	3	0	1	10	3	+7	6	Teams finished on level points and played a play-off on a neutral ground	—	3–0	5–1
2	Bulgaria	4	3	0	1	6	4	+2	6	Teams finished on level points and played a play-off on a neutral ground	1–0	—	3–1
3	Finland	4	0	0	4	3	12	−9	0		1–2	0–2	—

Source: FIFA

== Matches ==
25 September 1960

Finland	1–2	France
Pahlman 36' (pen.)	Report	Wisnieski 63'; Ujlaki 83'

Helsinki, Finland
Attendance: 15,572
Referee: Malka (West Germany)

11 December 1960

France	3–0	Bulgaria
Wisnieski 48'; Marcel 58'; Cossou 80'	Report

Stade Olympique Yves-du-Manoir, Colombes, France
Attendance: 40,690
Referee: Bonetto (Italy)

16 June 1961

Finland	0–2	Bulgaria
	Report	Iliev 33'; Kolev 75' (pen.)

Olympiastadion, Helsinki, Finland
Attendance: 11,977
Referee: Latyshev (Soviet Union)

28 September 1961

France	5–1	Finland
Faivre 6', 41'; Wisnieski 12'; Piantoni 79'; Schultz 86'	Report	Pahlman 44'

Paris, France
Attendance: 17,013
Referee: Dienst (Switzerland)

29 October 1961

Bulgaria	3–1	Finland
Yakimov 28'; Diev 34'; Velichkov 86'	Report	Pietiläinen 10'

Vasil Levski, Sofia, Bulgaria
Attendance: 40,000
Referee: Baçar (Turkey)

12 November 1961

Bulgaria	1–0	France
Iliev 89'	Report

Vasil Levski, Sofia, Bulgaria
Attendance: 55,000
Referee: Fend (Czechoslovakia)

Bulgaria and France finished level on points, and a play-off on neutral ground was played to decide who would qualify.

16 December 1961

Bulgaria	1–0	France
Yakimov 47'	Report

San Siro, Milan, Italy
Attendance: 34,740
Referee: Lo Bello (Italy)
