= Northern Ireland national football team results (1960–1979) =

- Win Draw Loss

The Northern Ireland national football team represents Northern Ireland in international association football. From 1882 to 1921 all of Ireland was represented by a single side, the Ireland national football team, organised by the Irish Football Association (IFA).

In 1920 Ireland was partitioned into Northern Ireland and Southern Ireland. In 1922, The south of Ireland gained independence as the Irish Free State, later to become Republic of Ireland. Amid these political upheavals, a rival football association, the Football Association of Ireland (the F.A.I.), emerged in Dublin in 1921 and organised a separate league and later a national team. In 1923, during a period when the home nations had dis-affiliated from the governing body, the FAI was recognised by FIFA as the governing body of the Irish Free State on the condition that it changed its name to the Football Association of the Irish Free State. At the same time, the IFA continued to organise its national team on an all-Ireland basis, regularly calling up Free State players. During this era at least one Northerner, Harry Chatton, also played for the Irish Free State and from 1936, the FAI began to organise their own all–Ireland team. Both teams now competed as Ireland and during this era at least 39 dual internationals were selected to represent both teams. Between 1928 and 1946 the IFA were not affiliated to FIFA and the two Ireland teams co-existed, never competing in the same competition.

In April 1951, FIFA decreed that the IFA team could not select "citizens of Eire". An exception was for British Home Championship games, as a 1923 IFAB agreement at Liverpool prevented FIFA intervention in relations between the four Home Nations. However, the exception would only apply "if the F.A. of Ireland do not object", and was never availed of.

At FIFA's 1953 congress, its Rule 3 was amended so that an international team must use "that title ... recognised politically and geographically of the countries or territories". The FAI initially claimed Rule 3 gave them the right to the name Ireland (see names of the Irish state), but FIFA subsequently ruled neither team could be referred to as Ireland, decreeing that the FAI team be officially designated as the Republic of Ireland, while the IFA team was to become Northern Ireland. The IFA objected and in 1954 was permitted to continue using the name Ireland in Home Internationals, based on the 1923 agreement. This practice was discontinued in the late 1970s. (Note: The last match played as Ireland was 1978 versus Scotland, however, apart from this match, all British Championship matches had been played as "Northern Ireland" since the 1973–74 tournament. In the 1972–73 tournament, the first two matches were played as "Ireland" and the third as "Northern Ireland". In the 1971–72 tournament, the first was played as "Ireland" and the second and third as "Northern Ireland". 1970–71 was the last tournament in which all matches were played under the name "Ireland".)

This is a list of the Northern Ireland national football team results from 1960 to 1979.

== 1960s ==
=== 1960 ===
6 April 1960 1959–60 British Home Championship	Wales	3–2	Ireland	Wrexham, Wales
Match 216	Medwin 4', 57'; Jones 65' (pen.)	Report	Bingham 67'; Blanchflower 80' (pen.)	Stadium: Racecourse Ground; Attendance: 16,979; Referee: Hugh Phillips (Scotland)

8 October 1960 1960–61 British Home Championship	Ireland	2–5	England	Belfast, Northern Ireland
Match 217	McAdams 38', 57'	Report	Smith 16'; Greaves 41', 47', 88'; Douglas 80'	Stadium: Windsor Park; Attendance: 60,000; Referee: Hugh Phillips (Scotland)

26 October 1960 1962 FIFA World Cup Group 3 Qualifier	Northern Ireland	3–4	West Germany	Belfast, Northern Ireland
Match 218	McAdams 21', 51', 90'	Report	Brülls 7'; Seeler 53'; Dörfel 55', 80'	Stadium: Windsor Park; Attendance: 35,000; Referee: Leo Horn (Netherlands)

9 November 1960 1960–61 British Home Championship	Scotland	5–2	Ireland	Glasgow, Scotland
Match 219	Law 8'; Caldow 43' (pen.); Young 78'; Brand 80', 90'	Report	Blanchflower 48' (pen.); McParland 84'	Stadium: Hampden Park; Attendance: 34,544; Referee: Kevin Howley (England)

=== 1961 ===
12 April 1961 1960–61 British Home Championship	Ireland	1–5	Wales	Belfast, Northern Ireland
Match 220	Dougan 64'	Report	Charles 1'; Allchurch 2'; Leek 26'; Jones 48' (pen.), 70'	Stadium: Windsor Park; Attendance: 30,000; Referee: Hugh Phillips (Scotland)

25 April 1961 International Friendly	Italy	3–2	Northern Ireland	Bologna, Italy
Match 221	Stacchini 30', 58'; Sívori 78'	Report	Dougan 71'; McAdams 72'	Stadium: Stadio Comunale; Attendance: 17,500; Referee: Jacques Devillers (France)

3 May 1961 1962 FIFA World Cup Group 3 Qualifier	Greece	2–1	Northern Ireland	Athens, Greece
Match 222	Papaemmanouil 8', 64'	Report	McIlroy 81'	Stadium: Leoforos Alexandras Stadium; Attendance: 12,942; Referee: Eli Priesner (Israel)

10 May 1961 1962 FIFA World Cup Group 3 Qualifier	West Germany	2–1	Northern Ireland	West Berlin, West Germany
Match 223	Kreß 28'; Brülls 58'	Report	McIlroy 69'	Stadium: Olympiastadion; Attendance: 95,000; Referee: Gösta Lindberg (Sweden)

7 October 1961 1961–62 British Home Championship	Ireland	1–6	Scotland	Belfast, Northern Ireland
Match 224	McLaughlin 17'	Report	Wilson 14'; Scott 34', 53', 79'; Brand 38', 69'	Stadium: Windsor Park; Attendance: 41,000; Referee: James Finney (England)

17 October 1961 1962 FIFA World Cup Group 3 Qualifier	Northern Ireland	2–0	Greece	Belfast, Northern Ireland
Match 225	McLaughlin 28', 57'	Report		Stadium: Windsor Park; Attendance: 21,250; Referee: Pietro Bonetto (Italy)

22 November 1961 1961–62 British Home Championship	England	1–1	Ireland	London, England
Match 226	Charlton 20'	Report	McIlroy 82'	Stadium: Wembley; Attendance: 30,000; Referee: Leo Callaghan (Wales)

=== 1962 ===
11 April 1962 1961–62 British Home Championship	Wales	4–0	Ireland	Cardiff, Wales
Match 227	Mel Charles 15', 35', 60', 65'	Report		Stadium: Ninian Park; Attendance: 13,250; Referee: George McCabe (England)

9 May 1962 International Friendly	Netherlands	4–0	Northern Ireland	Rotterdam, Netherlands
Match 228	Swart 48' van der Kuil 51' van der Linden 70', 73'	Report		Stadium: De Kuip; Attendance: 30,000; Referee: Werner Treichel (West Germany)

10 October 1962 1964 European Nations' Cup Qualifying; Preliminary Round	Poland	0–2	Northern Ireland	Chorzów, Poland
Match 229		Report	Dougan 17'; Humphries 54'	Stadium: Stadion Śląski; Attendance: 31,500; Referee: Bertil Wilhelm Lööw (Sweden)

20 October 1962 1962–63 British Home Championship	Ireland	1–3	England	Belfast, Northern Ireland
Match 230	Barr 62'	Report	Greaves 38'; O'Grady 71', 73'	Stadium: Windsor Park; Attendance: 55,000; Referee: James Barclay (Scotland)

7 November 1962 1962–63 British Home Championship	Scotland	5–1	Ireland	Glasgow, Scotland
Match 231	Law 40', 60', 73', 86'; Henderson 76'	Report	Bingham 8'	Stadium: Hampden Park; Attendance: 58,804; Referee: James Finney (England)

28 November 1962 1964 European Nations' Cup Qualifying; Preliminary Round	Northern Ireland	2–0 (4-0 agg.)	Poland	Belfast, Northern Ireland
Match 232	Crossan 8'; Bingham 63'	Report		Stadium: Windsor Park; Attendance: 28,833; Referee: Dittmar Huber (Switzerland)

=== 1963 ===
3 April 1963 1962–63 British Home Championship	Ireland	1–4	Wales	Belfast, Northern Ireland
Match 233	Harvey 36'	Report	Woosnam 33', 85', 89'; Jones 63'	Stadium: Windsor Park; Attendance: 25,000; Referee: George McCabe (England)

30 May 1963 1964 European Nations' Cup Qualifying; Round of 16	Spain	1–1	Northern Ireland	Bilbao, Spain
Match 234	Amancio 60'	Report	Irvine 76'	Stadium: Estadio San Mamés; Attendance: 27,960; Referee: Cesare Jonni (Italy)

12 October 1963 1963–64 British Home Championship	Ireland	2–1	Scotland	Belfast, Northern Ireland
Match 235	Bingham 26'; Wilson 63'	Report	St John 49'	Stadium: Windsor Park; Attendance: 39,000; Referee: Jack Taylor (England)

30 October 1963 1964 European Nations' Cup Qualifying; Round of 16	Northern Ireland	0–1 (1-2 agg.)	Spain	Belfast, Northern Ireland
Match 236		Report	Gento 66'	Stadium: Windsor Park; Attendance: 45,809; Referee: Andries van Leeuwen (Netherlands)

20 November 1963 1963–64 British Home Championship	England	8–3	Ireland	London, England
Match 237	Paine 2', 37', 61'; Greaves 20', 30', 60', 65'; Smith 46'	Report	Crossan 44'; Wilson 74', 85'	Stadium: Wembley Stadium; Attendance: 55,000; Referee: Leo Callaghan (Wales)

=== 1964 ===
15 April 1964 1963–64 British Home Championship	Wales	2–3	Ireland	Swansea, Wales
Match 238	Godfrey 24'; Davies 63'	Report	McLaughlin 8'; Wilson 37'; Harvey 45'	Stadium: Vetch Field; Attendance: 10,434; Referee: Ken Dagnall (England)

29 April 1964 International Friendly	Northern Ireland	3–0	Uruguay	Belfast, Northern Ireland
Match 239	Crossan 39' (pen.), 79' (pen.); Wilson 66'	Report		Stadium: Windsor Park; Attendance: 23,000; Referee: Kevin Howley (England)

3 October 1964 1964–65 British Home Championship	Ireland	3–4	England	Belfast, Northern Ireland
Match 240	Wilson 52'; McLaughlin 55', 67'	Report	Pickering 7'; Greaves 12', 16', 24'	Stadium: Windsor Park; Attendance: 58,000; Referee: William Brittle (Scotland)

14 October 1964 1966 FIFA World Cup Group 5 Qualifier	Northern Ireland	1–0	Switzerland	Belfast, Northern Ireland
Match 241	Crossan 46' (pen.)	Report		Stadium: Windsor Park; Attendance: 28,598; Referee: Hubert Burguet (Belgium)

14 November 1964 1966 FIFA World Cup Group 5 Qualifier	Switzerland	2–1	Northern Ireland	Lausanne, Switzerland
Match 242	Quentin 29'; Kuhn 34'	Report	Best 31'	Stadium: Stade olympique de la Pontaise; Attendance: 22,162; Referee: Paul Schiller (Austria)

25 November 1964 1964–65 British Home Championship	Scotland	3–2	Ireland	Glasgow, Scotland
Match 243	Wilson 10', 30'; Gilzean 16'	Report	Best 9'; Irvine 18'	Stadium: Hampden Park; Attendance: 48,752; Referee: George Powell (Wales)

=== 1965 ===
17 March 1965 1966 FIFA World Cup Group 5 Qualifier	Northern Ireland	2–1	Netherlands	Belfast, Northern Ireland
Match 244	Crossan 11'; Neill 62'	Report	van Nee 6'	Stadium: Windsor Park; Attendance: 25,300; Referee: Tage Sørensen (Denmark)

31 March 1965 1964–65 British Home Championship	Ireland	0–5	Wales	Belfast, Northern Ireland
Match 245		Report	Jones 20'; Vernon 33', 48'; Williams; Allchurch	Stadium: Windsor Park; Attendance: 15,000; Referee: Ken Dagnall (England)

7 April 1965 1966 FIFA World Cup Group 5 Qualifier	Netherlands	0–0	Northern Ireland	Rotterdam, Netherlands
Match 246		Report		Stadium: De Kuip; Attendance: 61,954; Referee: Bill Clements (England)

7 May 1965 1966 FIFA World Cup Group 5 Qualifier	Northern Ireland	4–1	Albania	Belfast, Northern Ireland
Match 247	Crossan 17', 30', 73' (pen.); Best 85'	Report	Jashari 49'	Stadium: Windsor Park; Attendance: 16,017; Referee: Norman Mootz (Luxembourg)

2 October 1965 1965–66 British Home Championship	Ireland	3–2	Scotland	Belfast, Northern Ireland
Match 248	Dougan 42'; Crossan 60'; Irvine 89'	Report	Gilzean 17', 81'	Stadium: Windsor Park; Attendance: 53,000; Referee: Jack Taylor (England)

10 November 1965 1965–66 British Home Championship	England	2–1	Ireland	London, England
Match 249	Baker 19'; Peacock 73'	Report	Irvine 21'	Stadium: Wembley Stadium; Attendance: 70,000; Referee: Leo Callaghan (Wales)

24 November 1965 1966 FIFA World Cup Group 5 Qualifier	Albania	1–1	Northern Ireland	Tirana, Albania
Match 250	Haxhiu 77'	Report	Irvine 58'	Stadium: Qemal Stafa Stadium; Attendance: 16,381; Referee: Petre Sotir (Romania)

=== 1966 ===
30 March 1966 1965–66 British Home Championship	Wales	1–4	Ireland	Cardiff, Wales
Match 251	Davies 74'	Report	Irvine 2'; Wilson 42'; Welsh 53'; Harvey 55'	Stadium: Ninian Park; Attendance: 12,860; Referee: James Finney (England)

7 May 1966 International Friendly	Northern Ireland	0–2	West Germany	Belfast, Northern Ireland
Match 252		Report	Seeler 21'; Heiß 57'	Stadium: Windsor Park; Attendance: 22,000; Referee: Hugh Phillips (Scotland)

22 June 1966 International Friendly	Northern Ireland	4–1	Mexico	Belfast, Northern Ireland
Match 253	Johnston 72'; Elder 76'; Nicholson; Ferguson 90'	Report	Peña 52' (pen.)	Stadium: Windsor Park; Attendance: 12,000; Referee: Jack Taylor (England)

22 October 1966 1966–67 British Home Championship; UEFA Euro 1968 Group 8 Qualifier	Northern Ireland	0–2	England	Belfast, Northern Ireland
Match 254		Report	Hunt 39'; Peters 60'	Stadium: Windsor Park; Attendance: 47,897; Referee: Robert Holley Davidson (Scotland)

16 November 1966 1966–67 British Home Championship; UEFA Euro 1968 Group 8 Qualifier	Scotland	2–1	Northern Ireland	Glasgow, Scotland
Match 255	Murdoch 14'; Lennox 35'	Report	Nicholson 9'	Stadium: Hampden Park; Attendance: 45,281; Referee: Jack Taylor (England)

=== 1967 ===
12 April 1967 1966–67 British Home Championship; UEFA Euro 1968 Group 8 Qualifier	Northern Ireland	0–0	Wales	Belfast, Northern Ireland
Match 256		Report		Stadium: Windsor Park; Attendance: 17,643; Referee: Kevin Howley (England)

21 October 1967 1967–68 British Home Championship; UEFA Euro 1968 Group 8 Qualifier	Northern Ireland	1–0	Scotland	Belfast, Northern Ireland
Match 257	Clements 69'	Report		Stadium: Windsor Park; Attendance: 46,300; Referee: James Finney (England)

22 November 1967 1967–68 British Home Championship; UEFA Euro 1968 Group 8 Qualifier	England	2–0	Northern Ireland	London, England
Match 258	Hurst 43'; B. Charlton 62'	Report		Stadium: Wembley Stadium; Attendance: 83,969; Referee: Leo Callaghan (Wales)

=== 1968 ===
28 February 1968 1967–68 British Home Championship; UEFA Euro 1968 Group 8 Qualifier	Wales	2–0	Northern Ireland	Wrexham, Wales
Match 259	Rees 75'; Davies 84'	Report		Stadium: Racecourse Ground; Attendance: 17,548; Referee: Robert Holley Davidson (Scotland)

10 September 1968 International Friendly	Israel	2–3	Northern Ireland	Tel Aviv, Israel
Match 260	Spiegler 52'; Talbi 63'	Report	Irvine 5', 39'; Dougan 20'	Stadium: Bloomfield Stadium; Attendance: 21,000; Referee: Othmar Huber (Switzerland)

13 October 1968 1970 FIFA World Cup Group 4 Qualifier	Northern Ireland	4–1	Turkey	Belfast, Northern Ireland
Match 261	Best 32'; McMordie 47'; Dougan 66'; Campbell 76'	Report	Ogün 9'	Stadium: Windsor Park; Attendance: 38,363; Referee: Wim Schalks (Netherlands)

11 December 1968 1970 FIFA World Cup Group 4 Qualifier	Turkey	0–3	Northern Ireland	Istanbul, Turkey
Match 262		Report	Harkin 35', 88'; Nicholson 63'	Stadium: Mithatpaşa Stadium; Attendance: 19,110; Referee: Zanlin Ben Ganif (Algerian Football Federation)

=== 1969 ===
3 May 1969 1968–69 British Home Championship	Ireland	1–3	England	Belfast, Northern Ireland
Match 263	McMordie 63'	Report	Peters 39'; Lee 64'; Hurst 74' (pen.)	Stadium: Windsor Park; Attendance: 23,000; Referee: William Mullan (Scotland)

6 May 1969 1968–69 British Home Championship	Scotland	1–1	Ireland	Glasgow, Scotland
Match 264	Stein 53'	Report	McMordie 11'	Stadium: Hampden Park; Attendance: 7,455; Referee: David W. Smith (England)

10 May 1969 1968–69 British Home Championship	Ireland	0–0	Wales	Belfast, Northern Ireland
Match 265		Report		Stadium: Windsor Park; Attendance: 12,500; Referee: Eric Jennings (England)

10 September 1969 1970 FIFA World Cup Group 4 Qualifier	Northern Ireland	0–0	Soviet Union	Belfast, Northern Ireland
Match 266		Report		Stadium: Windsor Park; Attendance: 35,138; Referee: Michel Kitabdjian (France)

22 October 1969 1970 FIFA World Cup Group 4 Qualifier	Soviet Union	2–0	Northern Ireland	Moscow, Soviet Union
Match 267	Nodia 24'; Byshovets 79'	Report		Stadium: Central Lenin Stadium; Attendance: 83,057; Referee: Rudolf Scheurer (Switzerland)

== 1970s ==
=== 1970 ===
18 April 1970 1969–70 British Home Championship	Ireland	0–1	Scotland	Belfast, Northern Ireland
Match 268		Report	O'Hare 58'	Stadium: Windsor Park; Attendance: 31,000; Referee: Eric Jennings (England)

21 April 1970 1969–70 British Home Championship	England	3–1	Ireland	London, England
Match 269	Peters 6'; Hurst 57'; Charlton 81'	Report	Best 50'	Stadium: Wembley Stadium; Attendance: 100,000; Referee: Gaspar Pintado Viú (Spain)

25 April 1970 1969–70 British Home Championship	Wales	1–0	Ireland	Swansea, Wales
Match 270	Rees 36'	Report		Stadium: Vetch Field; Attendance: 27,067; Referee: James Finney (England)

11 November 1970 UEFA Euro 1972 Group 4 Qualifier	Spain	3–0	Northern Ireland	Seville, Spain
Match 271	Rexach 39'; Pirri 60'; Aragonés 75'	Report		Stadium: Estadio Ramón Sánchez Pizjuán; Attendance: 26,215; Referee: Gyula Emsberger (Hungary)

=== 1971 ===
3 February 1971 UEFA Euro 1972 Group 4 Qualifier	Cyprus	0–3	Northern Ireland	Nicosia, Cyprus
Match 272		Report	Nicholson 53'; Dougan 55'; Best 86' (pen.)	Stadium: GSP Stadium; Attendance: 9,119; Referee: Francesco Francescon (Italy)

21 April 1971 UEFA Euro 1972 Group 4 Qualifier	Northern Ireland	5–0	Cyprus	Belfast, Northern Ireland
Match 273	Dougan 20'; Best 44', 47', 56'; Nicholson 85'	Report		Stadium: Windsor Park; Attendance: 19,153; Referee: Jacques Colling (Luxembourg)

15 May 1971 1970–71 British Home Championship	Ireland	0–1	England	Belfast, Northern Ireland
Match 274		Report	Clarke 80'	Stadium: Windsor Park; Attendance: 30,000; Referee: Alistair MacKenzie (Scotland)

18 May 1971 1970–71 British Home Championship	Scotland	0–1	Ireland	Glasgow, Scotland
Match 275		Report	Greig 14' (o.g.)	Stadium: Hampden Park; Attendance: 31,643; Referee: Clive Thomas (Wales)

22 May 1971 1970–71 British Home Championship	Ireland	1–0	Wales	Belfast, Northern Ireland
Match 276	Hamilton 27'	Report		Stadium: Windsor Park; Attendance: 23,000; Referee: Ken Burns (England)

22 September 1971 UEFA Euro 1972 Group 4 Qualifier	Soviet Union	1–0	Northern Ireland	Moscow, Russia
Match 277	Muntyan 43' (pen.)	Report		Stadium: Central Lenin Stadium; Attendance: 51,186; Referee: Ove Dahlberg (Sweden)

13 October 1971 UEFA Euro 1972 Group 4 Qualifier	Northern Ireland	1–1	Soviet Union	Belfast, Northern Ireland
Match 278	Nicholson 13'	Report	Byshovets 32'	Stadium: Windsor Park; Attendance: 16,573; Referee: Rolf Nyhus (Norway)

=== 1972 ===
16 February 1972 UEFA Euro 1972 Group 4 Qualifier	Northern Ireland	1–1	Spain	Kingston upon Hull, England (Note: Match moved out of Northern Ireland because of The Troubles.)
Match 279	Morgan 72'	Report	Rojo 40'	Stadium: Boothferry Park; Attendance: 19,925; Referee: Jack Taylor (England)

20 May 1972 1971–72 British Home Championship	Ireland	0–2	Scotland	Glasgow, Scotland (Note: The match was moved, when death threats from the Provisional Irish Republican Army were sent to the Scottish Football Association and Scottish players who were scheduled to play at Windsor Park. As a result, Northern Ireland's home fixture was rescheduled to Hampden Park, effectively granting the Scottish team an extra home match.)
Match 280		Report	Law 86'; Lorimer 89'	Stadium: Hampden Park; Attendance: 39,710; Referee: Clive Thomas (Wales)

23 May 1972 1971–72 British Home Championship	England	0–1	Northern Ireland	London, England
Match 281		Report	Neill 33'	Stadium: Wembley Stadium; Attendance: 64,000; Referee: John Gow (Wales)

27 May 1972 1971–72 British Home Championship	Wales	0–0	Northern Ireland	Wrexham, Wales
Match 282		Report		Stadium: Racecourse Ground; Attendance: 15,647; Referee: Jack Taylor (England)

18 October 1972 1974 FIFA World Cup Group 6 Qualifier	Bulgaria	3–0	Northern Ireland	Sofia, Bulgaria
Match 283	Bonev 18' (pen.), 85' (pen.); Kolev 53'	Report		Stadium: Vasil Levski National Stadium; Attendance: 40,000; Referee: Gerhard Schulenburg (West Germany)

=== 1973 ===
14 February 1973 1974 FIFA World Cup Group 6 Qualifier	Cyprus	1–0	Northern Ireland	Nicosia, Cyprus
Match 284	Antoniou 88'	Report		Stadium: GSP Stadium, Eugenia and Antonios Theodotou; Attendance: 5,328; Referee: Aurel Bentu (Romania)

28 March 1973 1974 FIFA World Cup Group 6 Qualifier	Northern Ireland	1–1	Portugal	Coventry, England (Note: Match moved out of Northern Ireland because of The Troubles.)
Match 285	O'Neill 18'	Report	Eusébio 84' (pen.)	Stadium: Highfield Road; Attendance: 11,238; Referee: Paul Schiller (Austria)

8 May 1973 1974 FIFA World Cup Group 6 Qualifier	Northern Ireland	3–0	Cyprus	London, England (Note: Match moved out of Northern Ireland because of The Troubles.)
Match 286	Morgan 4'; Anderson 32', 44'	Report		Stadium: Craven Cottage; Attendance: 6,090; Referee: Iorwerth Jones (Wales)

12 May 1973 1972–73 British Home Championship	Ireland	1–2	England	Liverpool, England (Note: Match moved out of Northern Ireland because of The Troubles.)
Match 287	Clements 22' (pen.)	Report	Chivers 9', 82'	Stadium: Goodison Park; Attendance: 29,865; Referee: Clive Thomas (Wales)

16 May 1973 1972–73 British Home Championship	Scotland	1–2	Ireland	Glasgow, Scotland
Match 288	Dalglish 89'	Report	O'Neill 3'; Anderson 16'	Stadium: Hampden Park; Attendance: 38,852; Referee: Ken Burns (England)

19 May 1973 1972–73 British Home Championship	Northern Ireland	1–0	Wales	Liverpool, England (Note: Match moved out of Northern Ireland because of The Troubles.)
Match 289	Hamilton 14'	Report		Stadium: Goodison Park; Attendance: 4,946; Referee: Bobby Davidson (Scotland)

26 September 1973 1974 FIFA World Cup Group 6 Qualifier	Northern Ireland	0–0	Bulgaria	Sheffield, England (Note: Match moved out of Northern Ireland because of The Troubles.)
Match 290		Report		Stadium: Hillsborough Stadium; Attendance: 6,206; Referee: Rolf Nyhus (Norway)

14 November 1973 1974 FIFA World Cup Group 6 Qualifier	Portugal	1–1	Northern Ireland	Lisbon, Portugal
Match 291	Rui Jordão 34'	Report	O'Kane 68'	Stadium: Estádio José Alvalade; Attendance: 6,713; Referee: Pablo Sánchez Ibáñez (Spain)

=== 1974 ===
11 May 1974 1973–74 British Home Championship	Northern Ireland	1–0	Scotland	Glasgow, Scotland (Note: Match moved out of Northern Ireland because of The Troubles.)
Match 292	Cassidy 39'	Report		Stadium: Hampden Park; Attendance: 53,778; Referee: Iorwerth Jones (Wales)

15 May 1974 1973–74 British Home Championship	England	1–0	Northern Ireland	London, England
Match 293	Weller 73'	Report		Stadium: Wembley Stadium; Attendance: 45,500; Referee: Bobby Davidson (Scotland)

18 May 1974 1973–74 British Home Championship	Wales	1–0	Northern Ireland	Wrexham, Wales
Match 294	Smallman 26'	Report		Stadium: Racecourse Ground; Attendance: 9,311; Referee: Pat Partridge (England)

4 September 1974 UEFA Euro 1976 Group 3 Qualifier	Norway	2–1	Northern Ireland	Oslo, Norway
Match 295	Lund 50', 72'	Report	Finney 3'	Stadium: Ullevaal; Attendance: 6,585; Referee: Alfred Delcourt (Belgium)

30 October 1974 UEFA Euro 1976 Group 3 Qualifier	Sweden	0–2	Northern Ireland	Stockholm, Sweden
Match 296		Report	Nicholl 7'; O'Neill 23'	Stadium: Råsunda Stadion; Attendance: 18,131; Referee: Theodorus Boosten (Netherlands)

=== 1975 ===
16 April 1975 UEFA Euro 1976 Group 3 Qualifier	Northern Ireland	1–0	Yugoslavia	Belfast, Northern Ireland
Match 297	Hamilton 23'	Report		Stadium: Windsor Park; Attendance: 25,847; Referee: Robert Wurtz (France)

17 May 1975 1974–75 British Home Championship	Northern Ireland	0–0	England	Belfast, Northern Ireland
Match 298		Report		Stadium: Windsor Park; Attendance: 36,500; Referee: Thomas Reynolds (Wales)

20 May 1975 1974–75 British Home Championship	Scotland	3–0	Northern Ireland	Glasgow, Scotland
Match 299	MacDougall 15'; Dalglish 21'; Parlane 80'	Report		Stadium: Hampden Park; Attendance: 64,686; Referee: Pat Partridge (England)

23 May 1975 1974–75 British Home Championship	Northern Ireland	1–0	Wales	Belfast, Northern Ireland
Match 300	Finney 23'	Report		Stadium: Windsor Park; Attendance: 17,000; Referee: Jack Taylor (England)

3 September 1975 UEFA Euro 1976 Group 3 Qualifier	Northern Ireland	1–2	Sweden	Belfast, Northern Ireland
Match 301	Hunter 32'	Report	Sjöberg 44'; Torstensson 55'	Stadium: Windsor Park; Attendance: 14,622; Referee: Hans-Joachim Weyland (West Germany)

29 October 1975 UEFA Euro 1976 Group 3 Qualifier	Northern Ireland	3–0	Norway	Belfast, Northern Ireland
Match 302	Morgan 2'; McIlroy 5'; Hamilton 53'	Report		Stadium: Windsor Park; Attendance: 8,923; Referee: Guðjón Finnbogason (Iceland)

19 November 1975 UEFA Euro 1976 Group 3 Qualifier	Yugoslavia	1–0	Northern Ireland	Belgrade, Yugoslavia
Match 303	Oblak 21'	Report		Stadium: Stadion JNA; Attendance: 21,545; Referee: Antonio Camacho Jiménez (Spain)

=== 1976 ===
3 March 1976 International Friendly	Israel	1–1	Northern Ireland	Tel Aviv, Israel
Match 304	Damti 36'	Report	Lev 58' (o.g.)	Stadium: Bloomfield Stadium; Attendance: 9,000; Referee: Werner Spiegel (Austria)

8 May 1976 1975–76 British Home Championship	Northern Ireland	0–3	Scotland	Glasgow, Scotland (Note: Match moved out of Northern Ireland because of The Troubles.)
Match 305		Report	Gemmill 23'; Masson 47'; Dalglish 52'	Stadium: Hampden Park; Attendance: 49,033; Referee: Thomas Reynolds (Wales)

11 May 1976 1975–76 British Home Championship	England	4–0	Northern Ireland	London, England
Match 306	Francis 34'; Channon 35' (pen.), 75'; Pearson 63'	Report		Stadium: Wembley Stadium; Attendance: 48,000; Referee: Clive Thomas (Wales)

14 May 1976 1975–76 British Home Championship	Wales	1–0	Northern Ireland	Swansea, Wales
Match 307	James 24'	Report		Stadium: Vetch Field; Attendance: 9,935; Referee: Ken Burns (England)

13 October 1976 1978 FIFA World Cup Group 4 Qualifier	Netherlands	2–2	Northern Ireland	Rotterdam, Netherlands
Match 308	Krol 64'; Cruijff 66'	Report	McGrath 4'; Spence 88'	Stadium: De Kuip; Attendance: 56,000; Referee: Ángel Franco Martínez (Spain)

10 November 1976 1978 FIFA World Cup Group 4 Qualifier	Belgium	2–0	Northern Ireland	Liège, Belgium
Match 309	Van Gool 29'; Lambert 52'	Report		Stadium: Stade Maurice Dufrasne; Attendance: 25,081; Referee: Adolf Prokop East Germany

=== 1977 ===
27 April 1977 International Friendly	West Germany	5–0	Northern Ireland	Cologne, West Germany
Match 310	Bonhof 55' (pen.); Fischer 58', 84'; Müller 65'; Flohe 90'	Report		Stadium: Müngersdorfer Stadion; Attendance: 58,000; Referee: Károly Palotai (Hungary)

28 May 1977 1976–77 British Home Championship	Northern Ireland	1–2	England	Belfast, Northern Ireland
Match 311	McGrath 4'	Report	Channon 27'; Tueart 86'	Stadium: Windsor Park; Attendance: 35,000; Referee: Brian McGinlay (Scotland)

1 June 1977 1976–77 British Home Championship	Scotland	3–0	Northern Ireland	Glasgow, Scotland
Match 312	Dalglish 37', 79'; McQueen 61'	Report		Stadium: Hampden Park; Attendance: 44,449; Referee: John Gow (Wales)

3 June 1977 1976–77 British Home Championship	Northern Ireland	1–1	Wales	Belfast, Northern Ireland
Match 313	Nelson 46'	Report	Deacy 27'	Stadium: Windsor Park; Attendance: 15,000; Referee: Jack Taylor (England)

11 June 1977 1978 FIFA World Cup Group 4 Qualifier	Iceland	1–0	Northern Ireland	Reykjavík, Iceland
Match 314	Albertsson 33'	Report		Stadium: Laugardalsvöllur; Attendance: 10,269; Referee: Rudi Glöckner (East Germany)

21 September 1977 1978 FIFA World Cup Group 4 Qualifier	Northern Ireland	2–0	Iceland	Belfast, Northern Ireland
Match 315	McGrath 67'; McIlroy 76'	Report		Stadium: Windsor Park; Attendance: 17,000; Referee: Henning Lund-Sørensen (Denmark)

12 October 1977 1978 FIFA World Cup Group 4 Qualifier	Northern Ireland	0–1	Netherlands	Belfast, Northern Ireland
Match 316		Report	W. van de Kerkhof 76'	Stadium: Windsor Park; Attendance: 33,000; Referee: António Garrido (Portugal)

16 November 1977 1978 FIFA World Cup Group 4 Qualifier	Northern Ireland	3–0	Belgium	Belfast, Northern Ireland
Match 317	Armstrong 42', 74'; McGrath 58'	Report		Stadium: Windsor Park; Attendance: 8,000; Referee: Georges Konrath (France)

=== 1978 ===
13 May 1978 1977–78 British Home Championship	Ireland	1–1	Scotland	Glasgow, Scotland (Note: Match moved out of Northern Ireland because of The Troubles.)
Match 318	O'Neill 26'	Report	Johnstone 36'	Stadium: Hampden Park; Attendance: 64,418; Referee: John Gow (Wales)

16 May 1978 1977–78 British Home Championship	England	1–0	Northern Ireland	London, England
Match 319	Neal 44'	Report		Stadium: Wembley Stadium; Attendance: 50,000; Referee: John Gordon (Scotland)

19 May 1978 1977–78 British Home Championship	Wales	1–0	Northern Ireland	Wrexham, Wales
Match 320	Deacy 70' (pen.)	Report		Stadium: Racecourse Ground; Attendance: 9,077; Referee: Ken Burns (England)

20 September 1978 UEFA Euro 1980 Group 1 Qualifier	Republic of Ireland	0–0	Northern Ireland	Dublin, Republic of Ireland
Match 321		Report		Stadium: Lansdowne Road; Attendance: 46,000; Referee: Francis Rion (Belgium)

25 October 1978 UEFA Euro 1980 Group 1 Qualifier	Northern Ireland	2–1	Denmark	Belfast, Northern Ireland
Match 322	Spence 63'; Anderson 85'	Report	Jensen 51'	Stadium: Windsor Park; Attendance: 25,000; Referee: Rolf Haugen (Norway)

29 November 1978 UEFA Euro 1980 Group 1 Qualifier	Bulgaria	0–2	Northern Ireland	Sofia, Bulgaria
Match 323		Report	Armstrong 17'; Caskey 83'	Stadium: Vasil Levski National Stadium; Attendance: 25,000; Referee: Hilmi Ok (Turkey)

=== 1979 ===
7 February 1979 UEFA Euro 1980 Group 1 Qualifier	England	4–0	Northern Ireland	London, England
Match 324	Keegan 24'; Latchford 46', 63'; Watson 49'	Report		Stadium: Wembley Stadium; Attendance: 91,244; Referee: Ulf Eriksson (Sweden)

2 May 1979 UEFA Euro 1980 Group 1 Qualifier	Northern Ireland	2–0	Bulgaria	Belfast, Northern Ireland
Match 325	Nicholl 16'; Armstrong 30'	Report		Stadium: Windsor Park; Attendance: 18,700; Referee: Mattsson (Finland)

19 May 1979 1978–79 British Home Championship	Northern Ireland	0–2	England	Belfast, Northern Ireland
Match 326		Report	Watson 11'; Coppell 14'	Stadium: Windsor Park; Attendance: 35,000; Referee: Ian Foote (Scotland)

22 May 1979 1978–79 British Home Championship	Scotland	1–0	Northern Ireland	Glasgow, Scotland
Match 327	Graham 76'	Report		Stadium: Hampden Park; Attendance: 28,510; Referee: Clive Thomas (Wales)

26 May 1979 1978–79 British Home Championship	Northern Ireland	1–1	Wales	Belfast, Northern Ireland
Match 328	Spence 1'	Report	James 63'	Stadium: Windsor Park; Attendance: 6,500; Referee: John Homewood (England)

6 June 1979 UEFA Euro 1980 Group 1 Qualifier	Denmark	4–0	Northern Ireland	Copenhagen, Denmark
Match 329	Elkjær 13', 33', 83'; Simonsen 64'	Report		Stadium: Parken Stadium; Attendance: 16,500; Referee: Rudolf Frickel (West Germany)

17 October 1979 UEFA Euro 1980 Group 1 Qualifier	Northern Ireland	1–5	England	Belfast, Northern Ireland
Match 330	Moreland 50' (pen.)	Report	Francis 18', 62'; Woodcock 34', 57'; Nicholl 74' (o.g.)	Stadium: Windsor Park; Attendance: 17,755; Referee: Alexis Ponnet (Belgium)

21 November 1979 UEFA Euro 1980 Group 1 Qualifier	Northern Ireland	1–0	Republic of Ireland	Belfast, Northern Ireland
Match 331	Armstrong 54'	Report		Stadium: Windsor Park; Attendance: 15,000; Referee: André Daina (Switzerland)
