= 1960–61 in Belgian football =

Football in Belgium
- Season: 1960–61

The 1960–61 season was the 58th season of competitive football in Belgium. Standard Liège won their second Division I title. K Lierse SK entered the 1960–61 European Champion Clubs' Cup as Belgian title holder and RU Saint-Gilloise entered the 1960–61 Inter-Cities Fairs Cup. The European Cup Winners' Cup was first played this season but no Belgian club participated since the Belgian Cup had not been played since 1955–56. The Belgium national football team started their qualifying campaign for the 1962 FIFA World Cup by 3 losses and were thus already eliminated at the end of the season with yet one match to be played.

== Overview ==
The Belgium national football team was drawn in Group 1 for the 1962 FIFA World Cup qualification with Sweden and Switzerland. Legendary midfielder Paul Van Himst played his first game with the national team in Sweden for the first game in the qualification, which Belgium lost 2-0. After 2 more losses to Switzerland, Belgium was already eliminated from the World Cup, with one more game to be played during the 1961–62 season.

At the end of the season, RCS Verviétois and VV Patro Eisden were relegated to Division II and were replaced in Division I by KFC Diest and RCS Brugeois from Division II.
The bottom 2 clubs in Division II (RRC de Bruxelles and K Lyra) were relegated to Division III while both Division III winners (ASV Oostende KM and KFC Herentals) qualified for Division II.
The bottom 2 clubs of each Division III league (US Centre, KFC Izegem, R Stade Waremmien FC and K Hasseltse VV) were relegated to the Promotion, to be replaced by Kontich FC, R Albert Elisabeth Club Mons, K Tongerse SV Cercle and KSV Sottegem from Promotion.

== National team ==
Date	Venue	Opponents	Score*	Comp	Belgium scorers
October 2, 1960	Bosuilstadion, Antwerp (H)	The Netherlands	1-4	F	Victor Wégria
October 19, 1960	Råsunda Stadium, Stockholm (A)	Sweden	0-2	WCQ
October 30, 1960	Heysel Stadium, Brussels (H)	Hungary	2-1	F	Paul Van Himst, Pierre Hanon
November 20, 1960	Heysel Stadium, Brussels (H)	Switzerland	2-4	WCQ	Paul Van Himst, Marcel Paeschen
March 8, 1961	Waldstadion, Frankfurt (A)	Germany	0-1	F
March 15, 1961	Parc des Princes, Paris (A)	France	1-1	F	Marcel Paeschen
March 22, 1961	Feijenoord Stadion, Rotterdam (A)	The Netherlands	2-6	F	Marcel Paeschen, Paul Van Himst
May 20, 1961	Stade Olympique de la Pontaise, Lausanne (A)	Switzerland	2-1	WCQ	Roger Claessen

* Belgium score given first

Key

- H = Home match
- A = Away match
- N = On neutral ground
- F = Friendly
- WCQ = World Cup qualification
- o.g. = own goal

== European competitions ==
K Lierse SK lost in the preliminary round of the 1960–61 European Champion Clubs' Cup to FC Barcelona of Spain (loss 2-0 away and 0-3 at home). RU Saint-Gilloise lost in the first round of the 1960–61 Inter-Cities Fairs Cup to AS Roma (draw 0-0 at home and defeat 1-4 away).

== Honours ==
Competition	Winner
Division I	Standard Liège
Division II	KFC Diest
Division III	ASV Oostende KM and KFC Herentals
Promotion	Kontich FC, R Albert Elisabeth Club Mons, K Tongerse SV Cercle and KSV Sottegem

== Final league tables ==
=== Premier Division ===
- 1960-61 Top scorer: Victor Wégria (RFC Liégeois) with 23 goals.
- 1960 Golden Shoe: Paul Van Himst (RSC Anderlechtois)
