= Faivre =

Faivre is a French surname.

== Geographical distribution ==
As of 2014, 90.8% of all known bearers of the surname Faivre were residents of France (frequency 1:4,311), 3.7% of the United States (1:564,455) and 2.7% of Switzerland (1:17,361).

In France, the frequency of the surname was higher than national average (1:4,311) in the following regions:

1. Bourgogne-Franche-Comté (1:447)
2. Mayotte (1:1,888)
3. French Polynesia (1:2,529)
4. New Caledonia (1:2,936)
5. Réunion (1:3,441)
6. Grand Est (1:3,696)

== People ==
- Antoine Faivre (1934–2021), French scholar
- Florence Faivre (born 1983), Thai actress and model
- Guillaume Faivre (born 1987), Swiss football player
- Jacques Faivre (1932–2020), French football player
- Virginie Faivre (born 1982), Swiss skier
