= 1962 FIFA World Cup qualification – UEFA Group 5 =

Football tournament

The three teams in this group played against each other on a home-and-away basis. The group winner qualified for the seventh FIFA World Cup held in Chile.

== Standings ==
Pos	Team	Pld	W	D	L	GF	GA	GD	Pts	Qualification	Soviet Union national football team	Turkey national football team	Norway national football team
1	Soviet Union	4	4	0	0	11	3	+8	8	Qualification to 1962 FIFA World Cup	—	1–0	5–2
2	Turkey	4	2	0	2	4	4	0	4		1–2	—	2–1
3	Norway	4	0	0	4	3	11	−8	0		0–3	0–1	—

Source: FIFA

== Matches ==
1 June 1961

Norway	0–1	Turkey
	Report	Oktay 16'

Ullevaal, Oslo, Norway
Attendance: 23,416
Referee: Hansen (Denmark)

18 June 1961

Soviet Union	1–0	Turkey
Voronin 20'	Report

Moscow, Soviet Union
Attendance: 102,000
Referee: Hirviniemi (Finland)

1 July 1961

Soviet Union	5–2	Norway
Metreveli 14'; Ponedelnik 26'; Bubukin 32', 66'; Meskhi 53'	Report	Borgen 64'; E. Hansen 87'

Moscow, Soviet Union
Attendance: 102,000
Referee: Kowal (Poland)

23 August 1961

Norway	0–3	Soviet Union
	Report	Ponedelnik 48'; Meskhi 49'; Metreveli 76'

Oslo, Norway
Attendance: 30,469
Referee: Meighan (Republic of Ireland)

29 October 1961

Turkey	2–1	Norway
Yelken 60'; Oktay 72'	Report	Jensen 59'

Istanbul, Turkey
Attendance: 26,000
Referee: Popa (Romania)

12 November 1961

Turkey	1–2	Soviet Union
Oktay 78'	Report	Gusarov 12'; Mamykin 18'

Istanbul, Turkey
Attendance: 34,000
Referee: Verner (Israel)
