= 1962 FIFA World Cup qualification – UEFA Group 1 =

Football tournament

The three teams in this group played against each other on a home-and-away basis. Sweden and Switzerland finished level on points and advanced to a play-off on neutral ground to decide who would qualify. The winner (Switzerland) qualified for the seventh FIFA World Cup held in Chile.

== Standings ==
Pos	Team	Pld	W	D	L	GF	GA	GD	Pts	Qualification	Sweden men's national football team	Switzerland national football team	Belgium national football team
1	Sweden	4	3	0	1	10	3	+7	6	Teams finished on level points and played a play-off on a neutral ground	—	4–0	2–0
2	Switzerland	4	3	0	1	9	9	0	6	Teams finished on level points and played a play-off on a neutral ground	3–2	—	2–1
3	Belgium	4	0	0	4	3	10	−7	0		0–2	2–4	—

Source: FIFA

== Matches ==
19 October 1960

Sweden	2–0	Belgium
Börjesson 52'; Brodd 73'	Report

Stockholm, Sweden
Attendance: 19,513
Referee: Wharton (Scotland)

20 November 1960

Belgium	2–4	Switzerland
Paeschen 25'; Van Himst 82'	Report	Antenen 22', 48', 79'; Schneiter 41'

Brussels, Belgium
Attendance: 25,000
Referee: Seipelt (Austria)

20 May 1961

Switzerland	2–1	Belgium
Ballaman 8', 16'	Report	Claessen 82'

Lausanne, Switzerland
Attendance: 38,000
Referee: Dorogi (Hungary)

28 May 1961

Sweden	4–0	Switzerland
Jonsson 8'; Börjesson 15', 75'; Simonsson 70'	Report

Stockholm, Sweden
Attendance: 17,400
Referee: Scares (Portugal)

4 October 1961

Belgium	0–2	Sweden
	Report	Brodd 70', 78'

Brussels, Belgium
Attendance: 75,000
Referee: Guerra (Portugal)

29 October 1961

Switzerland	3–2	Sweden
Antenen 8'; Wüthrich 68'; Eschmann 81'	Report	Simonsson 2'; Brodd 79'

Bern, Switzerland
Attendance: 55,000
Referee: Aston (England)

Sweden and Switzerland finished level on points, and a play-off on neutral ground was played to decide who would qualify.

12 November 1961

Switzerland	2–1	Sweden
Schneiter 65'; Antenen 76'	Report	Brodd 20'

West Berlin, West Germany
Attendance: 50,000
Referee: Dusch (West Germany)
