= 1962 FIFA World Cup qualification – UEFA Group 8 =

Football tournament

The three teams in this group played against each other on a home-and-away basis. Czechoslovakia and Scotland finished level on points and advanced to a play-off on neutral ground to decide who would qualify. The winner (Czechoslovakia) qualified for the seventh FIFA World Cup held in Chile.

== Standings ==
| Pos | Team | Pld | W | D | L | GF | GA | GD | Pts | Qualification | Czechoslovakia national football team | Scotland national football team | Republic of Ireland national football team |
|---|---|---|---|---|---|---|---|---|---|---|---|---|---|
| 1 | Czechoslovakia | 4 | 3 | 0 | 1 | 16 | 5 | +11 | 6 | Teams finished on level points and played a play-off on a neutral ground | — | 4–0 | 7–1 |
| 2 | Scotland | 4 | 3 | 0 | 1 | 10 | 7 | +3 | 6 | Teams finished on level points and played a play-off on a neutral ground | 3–2 | — | 4–1 |
| 3 | Republic of Ireland | 4 | 0 | 0 | 4 | 3 | 17 | −14 | 0 | | 1–3 | 0–3 | — |

Source: FIFA

== Matches ==
3 May 1961

| Scotland | 4–1 | Republic of Ireland |
|---|---|---|
| Brand 14', 40'; Herd 59', 85' | Report | Haverty 52' |

Glasgow, Scotland
Attendance: 46,696
Referee: Guigue (France)

7 May 1961

| Republic of Ireland | 0–3 | Scotland |
|---|---|---|
| | Report | Young 4', 16'; Brand 86' |

Dalymount Park, Dublin, Ireland
Attendance: 45,000
Referee: Grandain (Belgium)

14 May 1961

| Czechoslovakia | 4–0 | Scotland |
|---|---|---|
| Pospíchal 8', 85'; Kadraba 40'; Kvašňák 15' (pen.) | Report |

Bratislava, Czechoslovakia
Attendance: 50,000
Referee: Steiner (Austria)

29 September 1961

| Scotland | 3–2 | Czechoslovakia |
|---|---|---|
| Law 62', 83'; St. John 20' | Report | Kvašňák 6'; Scherer 51' |

Glasgow, Scotland
Attendance: 51,590
Referee: Gulliksen (Norway)

8 October 1961

| Republic of Ireland | 1–3 | Czechoslovakia |
|---|---|---|
| Giles 41' | Report | Scherer 2'; Kvašňák 61', 69' |

Dalymount Park, Dublin, Ireland
Attendance: 40,000
Referee: Holland (England)

29 October 1961

| Czechoslovakia | 7–1 | Republic of Ireland |
|---|---|---|
| Kvašňák 9', 37'; Scherer 24', 75'; Jelínek 31'; Masopust 62'; Pospíchal 58' | Report | Fogarty 57' |

Prague, Czechoslovakia
Attendance: 30,000
Referee: Lundell (Sweden)

Czechoslovakia and Scotland finished level on points, and a play-off on neutral ground was played to decide who would qualify.

29 November 1961

| Czechoslovakia | 4 – 2 (a.e.t.) | Scotland |
|---|---|---|
| Hledík 70'; Scherer 84'; Pospíchal 95'; Kvašňák 101' | Report | St. John 38', 71' |

Brussels, Belgium
Attendance: 6,000
Referee: Versyp (Belgium)
