= Foncho =

Foncho is a short form of Alfonso

- Stick with Foncho to make bananas fair
- Foncho (footballer) Alfonso Rodríguez Salas
