= 1962 FIFA World Cup qualification – UEFA Group 4 =

Football tournament

The three teams in this group played against each other on a home-and-away basis. The group winner qualified for the seventh FIFA World Cup held in Chile.

== Standings ==
Pos	Team	Pld	W	D	L	GF	GA	GD	Pts	Qualification	Hungary national football team	Netherlands national football team	East Germany national football team
1	Hungary	4	3	1	0	11	5	+6	7	Qualification to 1962 FIFA World Cup	—	3–3	2–0
2	Netherlands	3	0	2	1	4	7	−3	2		0–3	—	–
3	East Germany	3	0	1	2	3	6	−3	1		2–3	1–1	—

Source: FIFA

== Matches ==
16 April 1961

Hungary	2–0	East Germany
Albert 12'; Göröcs 52'	Report

Budapest, Hungary
Attendance: 32,000
Referee: Takov (Bulgaria)

30 April 1961

Netherlands	0–3	Hungary
	Report	Fenyvesi 22'; Sándor 24'; Tichy 36'

Rotterdam, Netherlands
Attendance: 65,000
Referee: Kingston (Wales)

14 May 1961

East Germany	1–1	Netherlands
Erler 79'	Report	Groot 63'

Leipzig, East Germany
Attendance: 70,000
Referee: Jörgensen (Denmark)

10 September 1961

East Germany	2–3	Hungary
Erler 53'; P. Ducke 87'	Report	Solymosi 43'; Sándor 75'; Tichy 78'

East Berlin
Attendance: 25,000
Referee: Lukianov (Soviet Union)

1 October 1961

Netherlands	Not Played	East Germany

Netherlands

22 October 1961

Hungary	3–3	Netherlands
Göröcs 19'; Monostori 21'; Tichy 80'	Report	Van de Linden 8', 14'; Groot 56'

Budapest, Hungary
Attendance: 30,000
Referee: Phillips (Scotland)
