= 1962 FIFA World Cup qualification – UEFA Group 9 =

Football tournament qualification stage

The two teams in this group played against each other on a home-and-away basis. The winner qualified for the seventh FIFA World Cup held in Chile.

== Standings ==
Pos	Team	Pld	W	D	L	GF	GA	GD	Pts	Qualification	Spain national football team	Wales national football team
1	Spain	2	1	1	0	3	2	+1	3	Advanced to the CAF–UEFA play-off	—	1–1
2	Wales	2	0	1	1	2	3	−1	1		1–2	—

Source: FIFA

== Matches ==
19 April 1961

Wales	1–2	Spain
Woosnam 7'	Report	Rodríguez 21'; Di Stéfano 78'

Cardiff, Wales
Attendance: 45,000
Referee: Reymaeckers (Belgium)

18 May 1961

Spain	1–1	Wales
Peiró 55'	Report	Allchurch 69'

Madrid, Spain
Attendance: 100,000
Referee: Horn (Netherlands)
