= Yngve Brodd =

Swedish footballer and manager

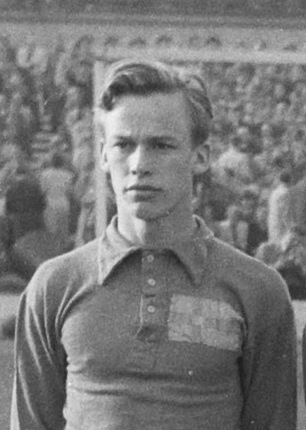
- Yngve Brodd in 1952

Personal information
- Full name: Rolf Yngve Brodd
- Date of birth: 9 June 1930
- Place of birth: Seglora, Sweden
- Date of death: 23 September 2016 (aged 86)
- Place of death: Gothenburg, Sweden
- Position: Striker

Youth career
- Rydals GOIF

Senior career*
Years	Team	Apps	(Gls)
–1952	Fritsla IF	33	(32)
1952–1953	Örebro SK	19	(7)
1953–1956	Toulouse	64	(15)
1956–1959	Sochaux	102	(39)
1960–1962	Toulouse	63	(21)
1962–1964	IFK Göteborg	47	(11)
Total		328	(126)

International career
1952–1962	Sweden B	2	(1)
1952–1963	Sweden	20	(12)

Managerial career
- 1963–1966: IFK Göteborg
- * Club domestic league appearances and goals

Olympic medal record

Men's Football

Representing Sweden
Bronze medal – third place	1952 Helsinki	

Rolf Yngve Brodd (9 June 1930 – 23 September 2016) was a Swedish professional footballer who played as a striker. He began his career with Fritsla IF and went on to represent Örebro SK, Toulouse, and Sochaux before retiring at IFK Göteborg in 1964. A full international from 1952 to 1963, he won 20 caps and scored 12 goals for the Sweden national team and was part of the Sweden squad that won bronze at the 1952 Summer Olympics.

== Club career ==
Brodd began his club career with Fritsla IF, and signed for Örebro SK after having scored 32 goals in 33 games in the lower divisions. While at Örebro, he scored 7 goals in 19 games before moving to France where he represented Toulouse and Sochaux between 1953 and 1962. He then wrapped up his career at IFK Göteborg as player-manager, playing in 47 games and scoring 11 goals until his retirement as a player in 1964.

== International career ==
Brodd made his international debut for the Sweden national team on 14 May 1952, in a friendly 0–0 draw with the Netherlands. He scored his first international goal on 11 June 1952, scoring the second goal in a 2–0 win against Denmark. Brodd was selected to represent Sweden at the 1952 Summer Olympics, and scored three goals as Sweden finished third. Brodd scored five goals in four games during the 1962 FIFA World Cup qualification campaign, as Sweden failed to qualify for the 1962 FIFA World Cup. He made his last international appearance on 14 August 1963 in a friendly 0–0 draw with Norway, playing for 86 minutes before being replaced by Bertil "Bebben" Johansson.

Brodd won a total of 20 caps for the Sweden national team between 1952 and 1963, scoring 12 goals. He also represented the Sweden B team twice, scoring one goal.

== Personal life ==
Brodd died on 23 September 2016 in Gothenburg.

== Career statistics ==
=== International ===
Appearances and goals by national team and year
National team	Year	Apps	Goals
Sweden	1952	10	5
Sweden	1953	0	0
Sweden	1954	0	0
Sweden	1955	0	0
Sweden	1956	0	0
Sweden	1957	0	0
Sweden	1958	0	0
Sweden	1959	0	0
Sweden	1960	1	1
Sweden	1961	3	4
Sweden	1962	3	1
Sweden	1963	3	1
Total		20	12

Scores and results list Sweden's goal tally first, score column indicates score after each Brodd goal.

List of international goals scored by Yngve Brodd
No.	Date	Venue	Opponent	Score	Result	Competition	Ref.
1	11 June 1952	Bislett Stadium, Oslo, Norway	Denmark	2–0	2–0	Friendly	
2	22 June 1952	Råsunda Stadium, Solna, Sweden	Denmark	2–0	4–3	1952–55 Nordic Football Championship	
3	21 July 1952	Ratina Stadium, Tampere, Finland	Norway	1–0	4–1	1952 Summer Olympics	
4	21 July 1952	Ratina Stadium, Tampere, Finland	Norway	2–0	4–1	1952 Summer Olympics	
5	23 July 1952	Bolt Arena, Helsinki, Finland	Austria	2–1	3–1	1952 Summer Olympics	
6	19 October 1960	Råsunda Stadium, Solna, Sweden	Belgium	2–0	2–0	1962 FIFA World Cup qualification	
7	4 October 1961	Heysel Stadium, Brussels, Belgium	Belgium	1–0	2–0	1962 FIFA World Cup qualification	
8	4 October 1961	Heysel Stadium, Brussels, Belgium	Belgium	2–0	2–0	1962 FIFA World Cup qualification	
9	29 October 1961	Wankdorf Stadium, Bern, Switzerland	Switzerland	2–2	2–3	1962 FIFA World Cup qualification	
10	12 November 1961	Olympiastadion, West Berlin, West Germany	Switzerland	1–0	1–2	1962 FIFA World Cup qualification	
11	19 June 1962	Helsinki Olympic Stadium, Helsinki, Finland	Finland	2–0	3–0	Friendly	
12	5 May 1963	Råsunda Stadium, Solna, Sweden	Hungary	2–1	2–1	Friendly	

== Honours ==
Sweden

- Summer Olympics bronze: 1952

Individual

- Stor Grabb: 1952
