= Aleksei Mamykin =

Soviet footballer

Personal information
- Full name: Aleksei Ivanovich Mamykin
- Date of birth: 29 February 1936
- Place of birth: Veryaevo, Ryazan Oblast, USSR
- Date of death: 20 September 2011 (aged 75)
- Height: 1.80 m (5 ft 11 in)
- Position: Striker

Youth career
- VVS Moscow
- FC Dynamo Moscow

Senior career*
Years	Team	Apps	(Gls)
1955–1958	FC Dynamo Moscow	43	(19)
1959–1963	CSKA Moscow	106	(35)
1964	FC SKA Rostov-on-Don	14	(2)
1965	SKA Odesa	5	(0)
Total		168	(56)

International career
1961–1962	USSR	9	(9)

Managerial career
- 1966–1967: SKA Odesa
- 1967–1971: CSKA Moscow (assistant)
- 1972: CSKA Moscow (youth teams)
- 1973–1975: GSVG, East Germany
- 1976–1977: CSKA Moscow
- 1977–1978: CSKA Moscow (youth teams)
- 1979–1980: SKA Kyiv
- 1981: CSKA Moscow (youth teams)
- 1982: Zvezda Jizzakh
- 1984–1987: Dzerzhinsky District Football School
- 1988–1994: CSKA Moscow (youth teams)
- 1996–: FC Dynamo-3 Moscow (youth teams)
- * Club domestic league appearances and goals

Aleksei Ivanovich Mamykin (Russian: Алексей Иванович Мамыкин; 29 February 1936 – 20 September 2011) was a Soviet football player and Russian coach.

== Honours ==
=== Club ===
Dynamo Moscow

- Soviet Top League: 1957

== International career ==
Mamykin made his debut for USSR on 10 September 1961 in a friendly against Austria. He played at the 1962 FIFA World Cup and scored a goal in a group game against Uruguay (he scored a hat-trick against Uruguay earlier that same year in a friendly).

=== International goals ===
Scores and results table. Soviet Union's goal tally first:

#	Date	Venue	Opponent	Score	Result	Competition
1	12 November 1961	Mithatpaşa Stadium, Istanbul, Turkey	Turkey	2–0	2–1	1962 FIFA World Cup qualification
2	22 November 1961	Estadio Nacional, Santiago, Chile	Chile	1–0	1–0	Friendly
3	11 April 1962	Stade Municipal, Luxembourg City, Luxembourg	Luxembourg	1–0	3–1	Friendly
4	11 April 1962	Stade Municipal, Luxembourg City, Luxembourg	Luxembourg	2–1	3–1	Friendly
5	18 April 1962	Råsunda, Stockholm, Sweden	Sweden	2–0	2–0	Friendly
6	27 April 1962	Central Lenin Stadium, Moscow, Russia	Uruguay	1–0	5–0	Friendly
7	27 April 1962	Central Lenin Stadium, Moscow, Russia	Uruguay	2–0	5–0	Friendly
8	27 April 1962	Central Lenin Stadium, Moscow, Russia	Uruguay	5–0	5–0	Friendly
9	6 June 1962	Estadio Carlos Dittborn, Arica, Chile	Uruguay	1–0	2–1	1962 FIFA World Cup

== Career statistics ==
=== International ===
National team	Year	Apps	Goals
Soviet Union
Soviet Union	1961	4	2
Soviet Union	1962	5	7
Total		9	9
