= 1962 FIFA World Cup qualification – UEFA Group 3 =

Football tournament

The three teams in this group played against each other on a home-and-away basis. West Germany won the group over Northern Ireland and Greece and qualified for the seventh FIFA World Cup held in Chile.

== Standings ==
Pos	Team	Pld	W	D	L	GF	GA	GD	Pts	Qualification	Germany national football team	Northern Ireland national football team	Greece national football team
1	West Germany	4	4	0	0	11	5	+6	8	Qualification to 1962 FIFA World Cup	—	2–1	2–1
2	Northern Ireland	4	1	0	3	7	8	−1	2		3–4	—	2–0
3	Greece	4	1	0	3	3	8	−5	2		0–3	2–1	—

Source: FIFA

== Matches ==
26 October 1960

Northern Ireland	3–4	West Germany
McAdams 27', 51', 90'	Report	Brülls 7'; Seeler 53'; Dörfel 55', 79'

Belfast, Northern Ireland
Attendance: 40,000
Referee: Horn (Netherlands)

20 November 1960

Greece	0–3	West Germany
	Report	Dörfel 8'; Brülls 31'; Haller 42'

Athens, Greece
Attendance: 27,000
Referee: Ehrlich (Yugoslavia)

3 May 1961

Greece	2–1	Northern Ireland
Papaemmanouil 8', 64'	Report	McIlroy 81'

Athens, Greece
Attendance: 20,000
Referee: Priesner (Israel)

10 May 1961

West Germany	2–1	Northern Ireland
Kreß 29'; Brülls 58'	Report	McIlroy 69'

West Berlin
Attendance: 94,000
Referee: Lindberg (Sweden)

17 October 1961

Northern Ireland	2–0	Greece
McLaughlin 28', 57'	Report

Belfast, Northern Ireland
Attendance: 24,000
Referee: Bonetto (Italy)

22 October 1961

West Germany	2–1	Greece
Seeler 5', 27'	Report	Papaemmanouil 59'

Augsburg, West Germany
Attendance: 53,000
Referee: Nilsen (Norway)
