= Adolf Scherer =

Slovak footballer (1938–2023)

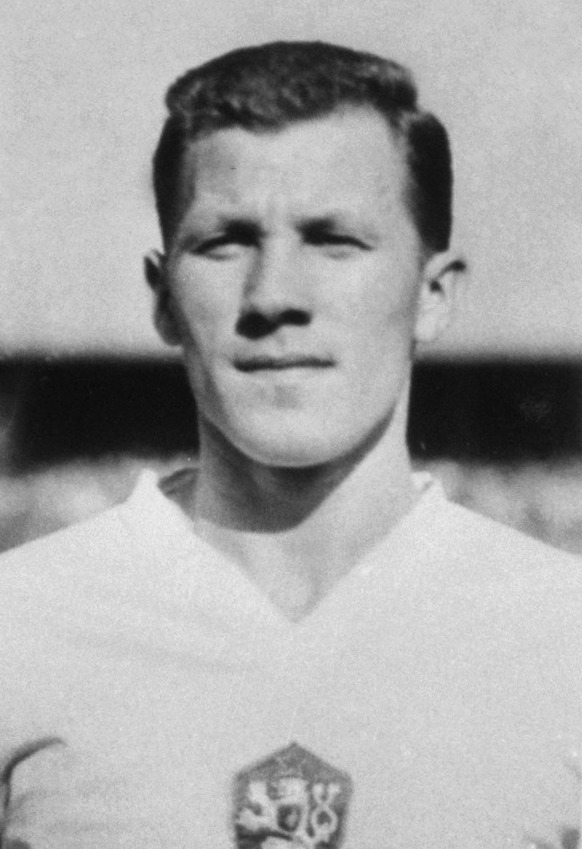
- Scherer in 1962

Personal information
- Date of birth: 5 May 1938
- Place of birth: Priekopa, First Czechoslovak Republic (today part of Martin, Slovakia)
- Date of death: 22 July 2023 (aged 85)
- Position: Striker

Senior career*
Years	Team	Apps	(Gls)
1957–1962	CH Bratislava	115	(72)
1962–1965	Slovnaft Bratislava	43	(27)
1965–1967	Lokomotíva Košice	5	(3)
1967–1969	VSS Košice	42	(26)
1969–1972	Nîmes	97	(76)
1972	Strojárne Martin		
1973–1975	Olympique Avignonais	65	(51)
Total		367	(255)

International career
1958–1964	Czechoslovakia	36	(22)
Medal record
Men's football
Representing Czechoslovakia
FIFA World Cup
Runner-up	1962 Chile
- * Club domestic league appearances and goals

Adolf Scherer (5 May 1938 – 22 July 2023) was a Slovak footballer who played as a striker. He was of Carpathian German descent. He played 36 games and scored 22 goals for the Czechoslovakia national team. Scherer represented Czechoslovakia at the 1960 European Nations' Cup and 1958 FIFA World Cup, where he did not play any match.

In the 1962 FIFA World Cup, he again played for the Czechoslovak national team where he proved himself to be a valuable player. They made it to the final match against Brazil, and Scherer assisted Josef Masopust in Czechoslovakia's first and only goal of the game. Brazil ultimately won the match, subsequently scoring three more.

Throughout the tournament, Scherer scored a total of three goals, including a winning goal in the quarterfinal against Hungary and a late goal against Yugoslavia in the semifinal.

In 1973, Scherer emigrated from Czechoslovakia to France, where he played for French football club Olympique Avignonais until his retirement in 1975.

He lived in southern France, near Nîmes with his wife. He had two children, a daughter and a son. His son, Rudolf (also known as 'Tcheck'), is, like his father, well involved in football. He played for various clubs including Nîmes Olympique. Rudolf now trains Barbentane football club, a city near Avignon.

Scherer died on 22 July 2023, at the age of 85.

== International goals ==
Scores and results list Czechoslovakia's goal tally first, score column indicates score after each Scherer goal.

List of international goals scored by Adolf Scherer
No.	Date	Venue	Opponent	Score	Result	Competition	Ref.
1	20 September 1958	Tehelné pole, Bratislava, Slovakia	Switzerland	1-1	2-1	1955–60 Central European International Cup	
2	18 October 1959	Stadion Za Lužánkami, Brno, Czech Republic	Denmark	2-1	5-1	1960 European Nations' Cup qualification	
3	18 October 1959	Stadion Za Lužánkami, Brno, Czech Republic	Denmark	5-1	5-1	1960 European Nations' Cup qualification	
4	1 November 1959	Great Strahov Stadium, Prague, Czech Republic	Italy	2-1	2-1	1955–60 Central European International Cup	
5	30 October 1960	Stadion Letná, Prague, Czech Republic	Netherlands	1-0	4-0	Friendly	
6	30 October 1960	Stadion Letná, Prague, Czech Republic	Netherlands	2-0	4-0	Friendly	
7	30 October 1960	Stadion Letná, Prague, Czech Republic	Netherlands	4-0	4-0	Friendly	
8	29 April 1961	Městský stadion, Ostrava, Czech Republic	Mexico	1-0	2-1	Friendly	
9	26 September 1961	Hampden Park, Glasgow, Scotland	Scotland	1-2	2-3	1962 FIFA World Cup qualification	
10	8 October 1961	Dalymount Park, Dublin, Republic of Ireland	Republic of Ireland	1-0	3-1	1962 FIFA World Cup qualification	
11	29 October 1961	Great Strahov Stadium, Prague, Czech Republic	Republic of Ireland	2-0	7-1	1962 FIFA World Cup qualification	
12	29 October 1961	Great Strahov Stadium, Prague, Czech Republic	Republic of Ireland	7-1	7-1	1962 FIFA World Cup qualification	
13	29 November 1961	King Baudouin Stadium, Brussels, Belgium	Scotland	—	4-2	1962 FIFA World Cup qualification	
14	22 April 1962	Great Strahov Stadium, Prague, Czech Republic	Uruguay	3-1	3-1	Friendly	
15	10 June 1962	Estadio Braden Copper Co, Rancagua, Chile	Hungary	1-0	1-0	1962 FIFA World Cup	
16	13 June 1962	Estadio Sausalito, Viña del Mar, Chile	Yugoslavia	2-1	3-1	1962 FIFA World Cup	
17	13 June 1962	Estadio Sausalito, Viña del Mar, Chile	Yugoslavia	3-1	3-1	1962 FIFA World Cup	
18	16 September 1962	Praterstadion, Vienna, Austria	Austria	4-0	6-0	Friendly	
19	28 October 1962	Tehelné pole, Bratislava, Slovakia	Poland	2-0	2-1	Friendly	
20	29 May 1963	Tehelné pole, Bratislava, Slovakia	England	1-2	2-4	Friendly	
21	2 June 1963	Great Strahov Stadium, Prague, Czech Republic	Hungary	1-0	2-2	Friendly	
22	29 April 1964	Südweststadion, Ludwigshafen, Germany	West Germany	4-2	4-3	Friendly	
