= 1962 FIFA World Cup qualification – UEFA Group 10 =

Football tournament qualification stage

The two teams in this group played against each other on a home-and-away basis. The winner qualified for the seventh FIFA World Cup held in Chile.

== Standings ==
Pos	Team	Pld	W	D	L	GF	GA	GD	Pts	Qualification	Yugoslavia national football team	Poland national football team
1	Yugoslavia	2	1	1	0	3	2	+1	3	Advanced to the UEFA–AFC play-off	—	2–1
2	Poland	2	0	1	1	2	3	−1	1		1–1	—

Source: FIFA

== Matches ==
4 June 1961

Yugoslavia	2–1	Poland
Kaloperović 42' (pen.); Kostić 49'	Report	Brychczy 65'

Belgrade, Yugoslavia
Attendance: 30,000
Referee: Stathatos (Greece)

25 June 1961

Poland	1–1	Yugoslavia
Szmidt 29'	Report	Galić 2'

Chorzów, Poland
Attendance: 100,000
Referee: Korelus (Czechoslovakia)
