= Jiří Hledík =

Czech footballer (1929–2015)

Personal information
- Date of birth: 19 April 1929
- Place of birth: Pardubice, Czechoslovakia
- Date of death: 25 April 2015 (aged 86)
- Place of death: Hradec Králové, Czech Republic
- Position: Defender

Youth career
- 1939–1948: Slavoj Pardubice

Senior career*
Years	Team	Apps	(Gls)
1949–1951	Slavoj Pardubice		
1952–1954	Křídla vlasti Olomouc		
1955	ÚDA Prague		
1956–1958	Sparta Prague		
1958–1966	Spartak Hradec Králové	122	(9)
1966–1968	Spartak Hradec Králové B		
1968–1969	ZAZ Jaroměř		

International career
1953–1962	Czechoslovakia	28	(1)
- * Club domestic league appearances and goals

Jiří Hledík (19 April 1929 – 25 April 2015) was a Czech football defender. He played for Czechoslovakia, for which he played 28 matches and scored one goal.

He was a participant in the 1954 FIFA World Cup where he played in the match against Uruguay.

In his country he played for Sparta Prague and FC Hradec Králové.
