= Alfonso Rodríguez Salas =

Spanish footballer

Foncho
Personal information
- Full name: Alfonso María Rodríguez Salas
- Date of birth: 29 April 1939
- Place of birth: La Laguna, Spain
- Date of death: 20 March 1994 (aged 54)
- Place of death: L'Hospitalet, Spain
- Height: 1.83 m (6 ft 0 in)
- Position: Defender

Youth career
- Orotava
- Porteño

Senior career*
| Years | Team | Apps | (Gls) |
| 1956–1958 | Tenerife | 11 | (0) |
| 1958–1959 | Eldense | 26 | (2) |
| 1959–1960 | Murcia | 25 | (0) |
| 1960–1967 | Barcelona | 92 | (0) |
| 1967–1968 | Zaragoza | 8 | (0) |
| Total | | 162 | (2) |

International career
| 1961 | Spain | 2 | (1) |
- * Club domestic league appearances and goals

Alfonso María Rodríguez Salas, aka Foncho (29 April 1939 – 20 March 1994), was a Spanish footballer, who played as a defender.

== Club career ==
Born in La Laguna, Tenerife, Rodríguez played club football for CD Tenerife, CD Eldense, Real Murcia, FC Barcelona and Real Zaragoza.

== International goals ==
| # | Date | Venue | Opponent | Score | Result | Competition |
|---|---|---|---|---|---|---|
| 1. | 19 April 1961 | Ninian Park, Cardiff, Wales | Wales | 1–1 | 1–2 | 1962 World Cup qualification |

== Honours ==
Barcelona

- Inter-Cities Fairs Cup: 1965–66
- Spanish Cup: 1962–63
