= Aydın Yelken =

Turkish footballer (1939–2022)

Personal information
- Date of birth: 3 May 1939
- Place of birth: Istanbul, Turkey
- Date of death: 16 August 2022 (aged 83)
- Place of death: Istanbul, Turkey
- Positions: Winger; forward

Youth career
- 1953–1957: Fenerbahçe

Senior career*
Years	Team	Apps	(Gls)
1957–1963	Karagümrük	93	(20)
1963–1966	Fenerbahçe	78	(29)
1966–1969	Altay	83	(9)
1969–1970	İzmirspor	30	(7)
1971	Hatayspor	2	(0)
1971–1972	İzmirspor	84	(19)
Total		370	(81)

International career
1961–1965	Turkey	9	(3)
- * Club domestic league appearances and goals

Aydın Yelken (3 May 1939 – 16 August 2022) was a Turkish footballer who played as a winger or forward. He made nine appearances for the Turkey national team from 1961 to 1965.

Yelken died on 16 August 2022, at the age of 83.
