= Tivadar Monostori =

Hungarian footballer

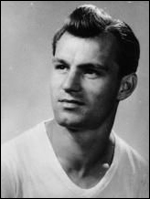

Personal information
- Date of birth: 24 August 1936
- Place of birth: Felsőgalla, Hungary
- Date of death: 18 March 2014 (aged 77)
- Position: Forward

Senior career*
Years	Team	Apps	(Gls)
1954–1967	Dorogi FC	243	(94)

International career
1958–1963	Hungary	9	(4)

Managerial career
- 1975: Tatabánya Bányász SC
- 1977–1979: Tatabánya Bányász SC
- * Club domestic league appearances and goals

Tivadar Monostori (24 August 1936 – 18 March 2014) was a Hungarian football forward who played for Hungary in the 1958 and 1962 FIFA World Cups. He also played for Dorogi FC.
