= Ernest Schultz =

French footballer (1931–2013)

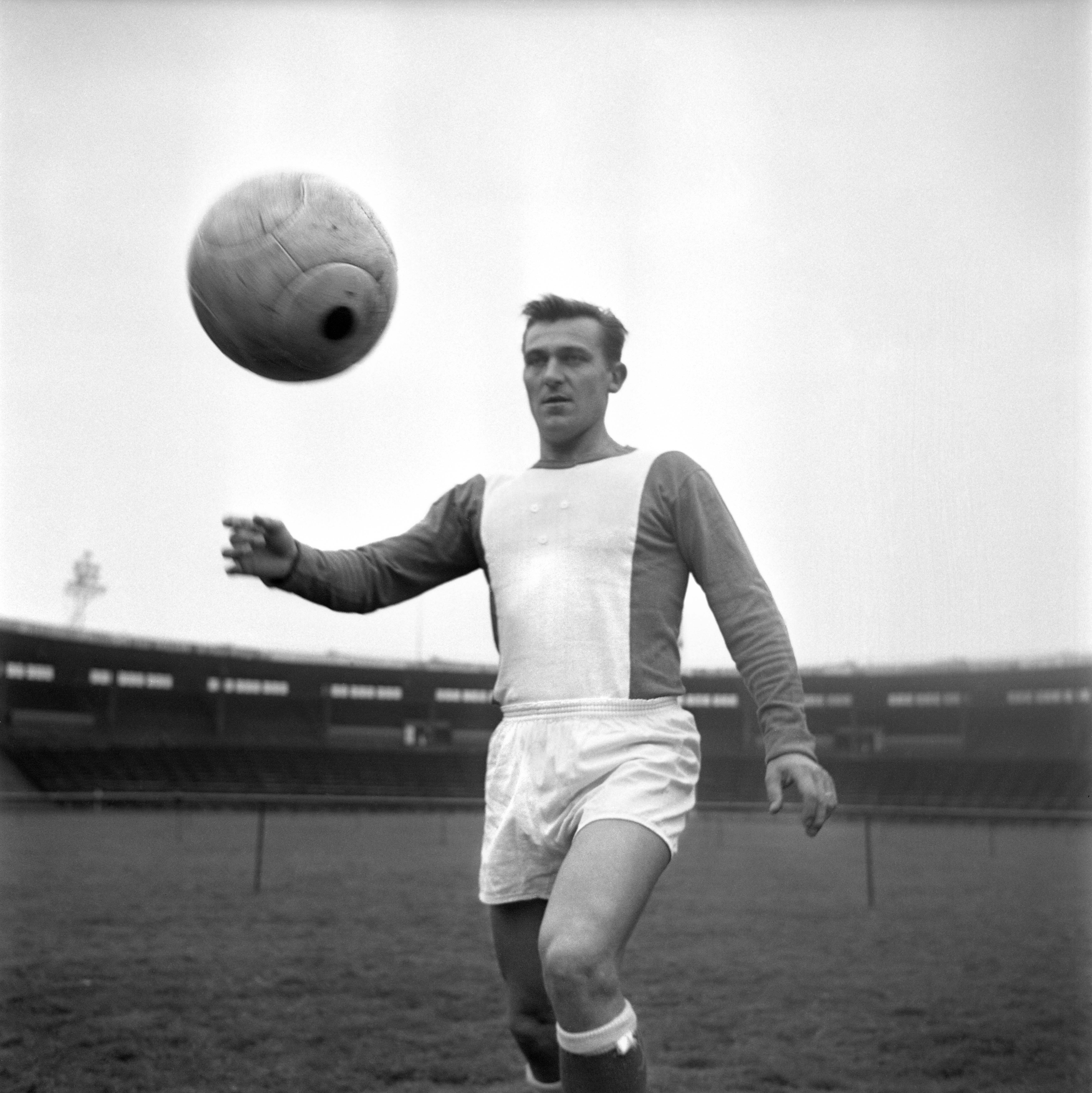
- Schultz in 1962

Personal information
- Date of birth: January 29, 1931
- Place of birth: Dalhunden, France
- Date of death: September 20, 2013 (aged 82)
- Position: Striker

Youth career
- Routzenhem

Senior career*
Years	Team	Apps	(Gls)
1952–1957	Lyon	147	(69)
1957–1964	Toulouse	187	(86)
1964–1967	Boulogne	76	(29)
Total		440	(200)

International career
1961	France	1	(1)

Managerial career
- 1967: Boulogne
- * Club domestic league appearances and goals

Ernest Schultz (January 29, 1931 in Dalhunden, Bas-Rhin – September 20, 2013) was a French footballer who played as a striker.
