= Jean-Jacques Marcel =

French footballer (1931–2014)

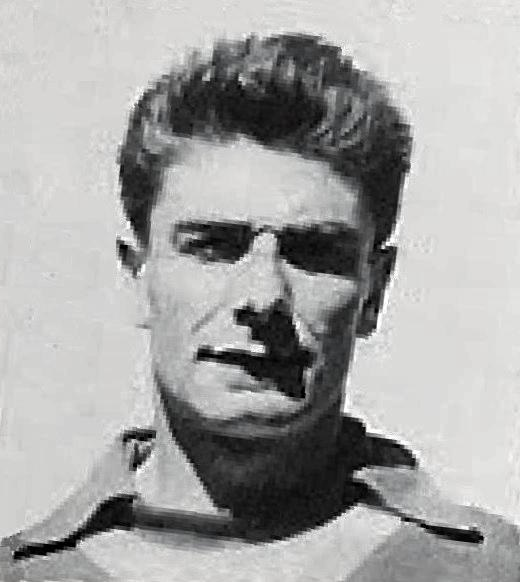
- Marcel in 1954

Personal information
- Full name: Jean-Jacques Lucien Élie Antoine Marcel
- Date of birth: 13 June 1931
- Place of birth: Brignoles, Var, France
- Date of death: 3 October 2014 (aged 83)
- Place of death: Marseille, Bouches-du-Rhône, France
- Height: 1.78 m (5 ft 10 in)
- Position: Defender

Youth career
- 1948–1949: Brignoles

Senior career*
Years	Team	Apps	(Gls)
1949–1954	Sochaux	116	(11)
1954–1959	Marseille	158	(23)
1959–1960	Sporting Toulon Var	31	(4)
1960–1965	RCF Paris	121	(38)
Total		426	(76)

International career
1953–1961	France	44	(3)
Medal record
Representing France
FIFA World Cup
Third place	1958
- * Club domestic league appearances and goals

Jean-Jacques Lucien Élie Antoine Marcel (13 June 1931 – 3 October 2014) was a French footballer who played defender. He was an integral part of the French national teams of the 1950s.

== Early life ==
Jean-Jacques Lucien Élie Antoine Marcel was born on 13 June 1931 in Brignoles, Var.

== Club career ==
Marcel was signed in 1949 by the FC Sochaux and in their youth team but fast played to the first. Marcel was a physically strong right runner with qualities both in the defensive and in the play forward, had a hard shot and a good head ball play – 76 goals in over 420 league plays were unusual in that time for a midfielder. Still playing for France U-21, he was for the first time called to France's first team in 1953 due to his constant achievements.

In 1954, he moved to his homeland region with Marseille and remained there for five years, playing alongside 17 years older Larbi Ben Barek. He played one year in Toulon before ending his professional career in 1965 with RCF Paris.

He won no titles, for not playing for big teams of the French championship, contrary to his teams in France national football team.

== International career ==
Between May 1953 and October 1961, Marcel appeared in 44 international matches for the France national football team (10 in his time with Sochaux, 24 with Marseille, 3 with Toulon and 7 with Paris). He scored three goals and was in four meetings as captain. His place in the national team was undisputed in all the years; thus he played naturally in the FIFA World Cup 1954 and 1958. The third place with France in Sweden was the largest success of his career. He also played at the first European championship (1960 in France). Until 1959, he formed a talented middle row together with Armand Penverne, in which Marcel – differently than in his clubs – played usually on the left side.

== Personal life ==
In 1965, Marcel returned to his birth city and played some years as an amateur with the club, from which he had come out. He vocationally supported his father, at that time mayor of Brignoles, in its trade in wine; subsequently, he worked as a representative of the sports article manufacturer Le Coq Sportif. Marcel lived withdrawn, but still in the small town between Fréjus and Aix-en-Provence.

== Death ==
Marcel died on 3 October 2014 in the 13th arrondissement of Marseille, Bouches-du-Rhône, at the age of 83.
