= Sauli Pietiläinen =

Finnish footballer (born 1941)

Personal information
- Date of birth: 20 July 1941 (age 85)

International career
Years	Team	Apps	(Gls)
1961	Finland	6	(1)

Sauli Pietiläinen (born 20 July 1941) is a Finnish footballer. He played in six matches for the Finland national football team in 1961.
