= Kai Pahlman =

Finnish footballer and coach (1935–2013)

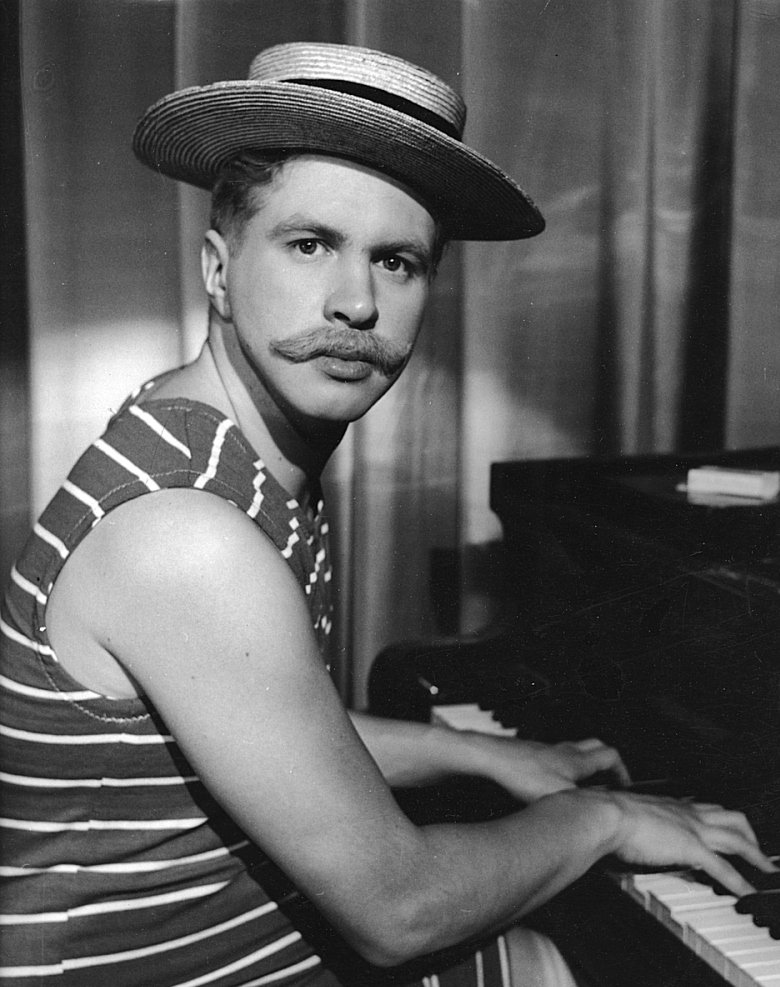
- Pahlman in Tähtisumua (1961)

Personal information
- Date of birth: 8 July 1935
- Place of birth: Helsinki, Finland
- Date of death: 8 March 2013 (aged 77)
- Position: Forward

Senior career*
Years	Team	Apps	(Gls)
1954–1963	HPS Helsinki	317	(116)
1965–1969	HJK Helsinki		
1970–1972	Reipas Lahti		

International career
1954–1968	Finland	56	(13)
- * Club domestic league appearances and goals

Kai Pahlman (8 July 1935 – 8 March 2013) was a Finnish football player and coach who played as a forward. Between 1954 and 1968 he capped 56 times for the Finland national team, scoring 13 goals. At club level Pahlman played for HPS, HJK and Reipas. Pahlman invented the curl ball, that he called The Banana Shot. Pahlman was the son of Finnish musician Helge Pahlman and an accomplished piano player and composer. He appeared as a piano player in the 1961 musical film Tähtisumua and composed music for several short documentaries in 1973.

== Honours ==
- Finnish Championship: 1957, 1970, 1973 (as a coach)
- Mestaruussarja top scorer: 1958, 1961, 1965
- Finnish Cup: 1962, 1966
- Finnish Footballer of the Year: 1958
