= Valentin Bubukin =

Russian footballer

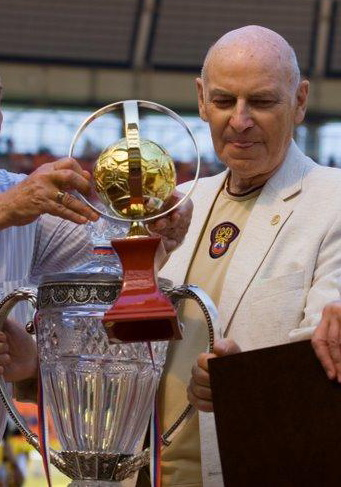
- Bubukin in 2007

Personal information
- Full name: Valentin Borisovich Bubukin
- Date of birth: 23 April 1933
- Place of birth: Moscow, Soviet Union
- Date of death: 30 October 2008 (aged 75)
- Place of death: Moscow, Russia
- Height: 1.80 m (5 ft 11 in)
- Position: Striker

Senior career*
Years	Team	Apps	(Gls)
1952	VVS Moscow (reserves)		
1953–1960	FC Lokomotiv Moscow	150	(49)
1961–1962	CSKA Moscow	20	(3)
1963–1965	FC Lokomotiv Moscow	118	(31)

International career
1959–1961	USSR	11	(4)

Managerial career
- 1966–1968: FC Lokomotiv Moscow
- 1970–1972: SC Tavriya Simferopol
- 1972–1974: FC Karpaty Lviv
- 1975–1977: CSKA Moscow (assistant)
- 1978: Thể Công (Vietnam)
- 1979: CSKA Moscow (assistant)
- 1980: CSKA Moscow (director)
- 1981–1983: CSKA Moscow (assistant)
- 1985–1987: CSKA Moscow (assistant)
Medal record
Representing Soviet Union
UEFA European Championship
Winner	1960 France
- * Club domestic league appearances and goals

Valentin Borisovich Bubukin (Russian: Валентин Борисович Бубукин; 23 April 1933 – 30 October 2008) was a Soviet/Russian footballer.

== Biography ==
Bubukin started training in aged 12 in the club Krylia Sovetov. He then moved to VVS Moscow, but the team was disbanded in 1952, and Bubukin went to FC Lokomotiv Moscow, where he spent most of his career. He made his debut for USSR on 6 September 1959 in a friendly against Czechoslovakia (he was selected for the 1958 FIFA World Cup squad, but did not play in any games at the tournament). He played in the first ever European Nations' Cup in 1960, which was won by the Soviet team.

After retiring in 1965, he worked as a football manager of Lokomotiv Moscow (1966–1968), SC Tavriya Simferopol (1970–1972), FC Karpaty Lviv (1972–1974), PFC CSKA Moscow (1975–1978, 1981–1987) and CSKA Hanoi (1978), winning the national title with Thể Công in Vietnam in 1978.

== Honours ==
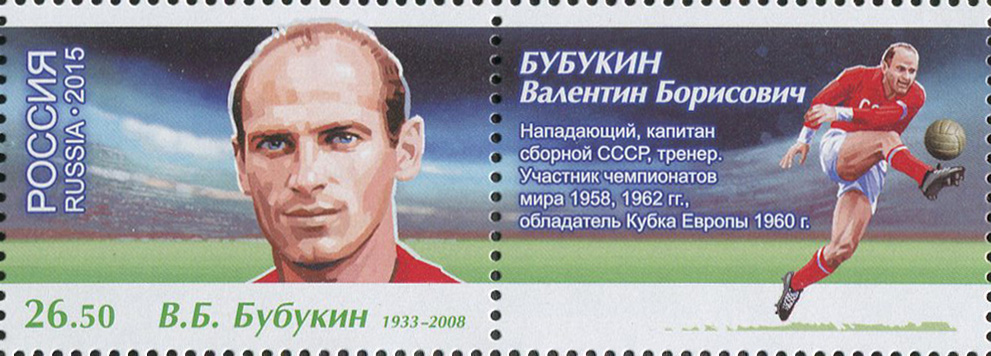
Bubukin on a 2016 Russian stamp from the series "Football Legends"

- 1960 European Nations' Cup winner.
- Soviet Top League runner-up: 1959.
- Soviet Cup winner: 1957.
- North Vietnam Football Championship winner (as a coach): 1978.

== Awards ==
- Order of Friendship (1997)
- Order of Honour (2003)
- Medal "For Labour Valour" (1960)
- Medal of Friendship (Vietnam)
