= Tomáš Pospíchal =

Czech footballer

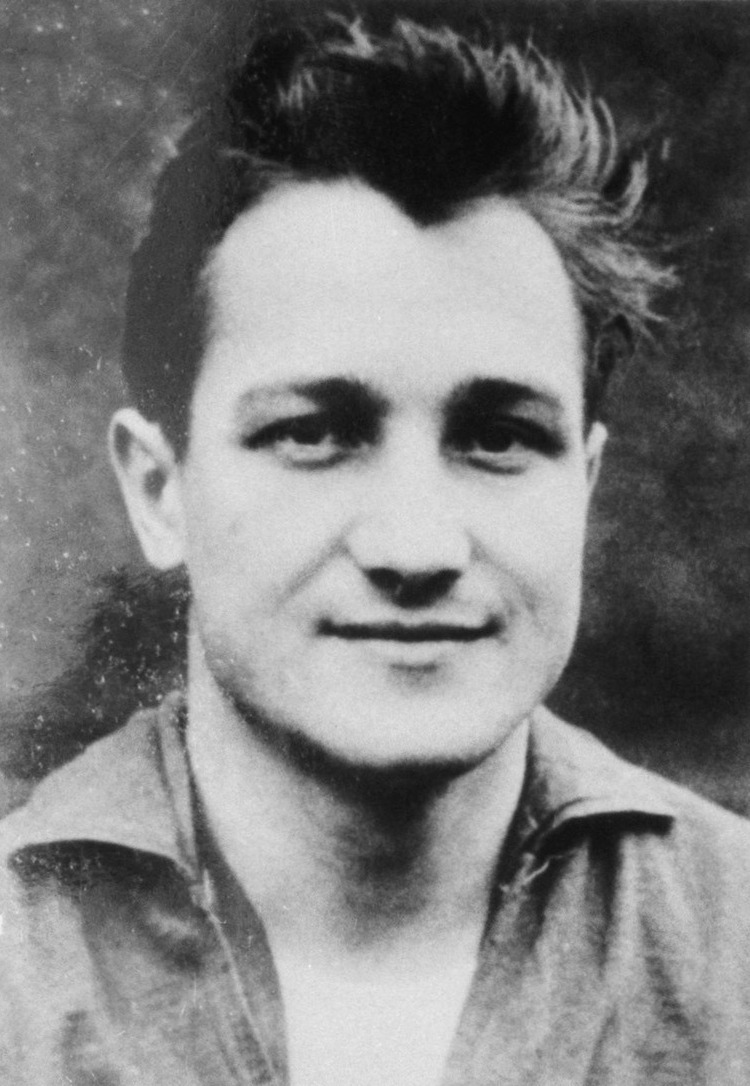
- Pospíchal in 1962

Personal information
- Full name: Tomáš Pospíchal
- Date of birth: 26 June 1936
- Place of birth: Pudlov, Czechoslovakia
- Date of death: 21 October 2003 (aged 67)
- Place of death: Prague, Czech Republic
- Position: Striker

Youth career
- 1945–1950: SK Přerov
- 1950–1951: Sokol Telč
- 1951–1952: Sokol OKD Ostrava

Senior career*
Years	Team	Apps	(Gls)
1952–1955	Baník Vítkovice		
1955–1956	Tankista Praha		
1956–1957	Dukla Pardubice		
1957–1964	FC Baník Ostrava	68	(18)
1964–1968	Sparta Prague	321	(79)
1968–1971	FC Rouen		

International career
1956–1965	Czechoslovakia	26	(8)

Managerial career
- 1972–1975: Baník Ostrava
- 1975–1977: Škoda Plzeň
- 1977–1987: Bohemians Praha
- 1987–1988: Slavia Prague
Medal record
Men's football
Representing Czechoslovakia
FIFA World Cup
Runner-up	1962 Chile
- * Club domestic league appearances and goals

Tomáš Pospíchal (26 June 1936 – 21 October 2003) was a Czech football player.

Pospíchal played for several clubs, including TJ Vítkovice (1952–1955), Baník Ostrava (1957–1964), Sparta Prague (1964–1968) and FC Rouen (1968–1971).

He played for the Czechoslovakia national team (26 matches and 8 goals), and was a participant at the 1962 FIFA World Cup, where he played in the last three matches. In the final, he provided the assist for Josef Masopust's goal that opened the scoring, in a match Brazil would eventually go on to win.

After ending his career as a player he started coaching. Pospíchal coached several top Czech clubs, including Baník Ostrava (1972–1975), Bohemians Praha (1977–1987) and Slavia Prague (1987–1988). He won Czechoslovak League with Bohemians in 1983.

Pospíchal is credited with his famous saying: "Football has no logic" (Fotbal nemá logiku).
