= Heinz Schneiter =

Swiss footballer and manager (1935-2017)

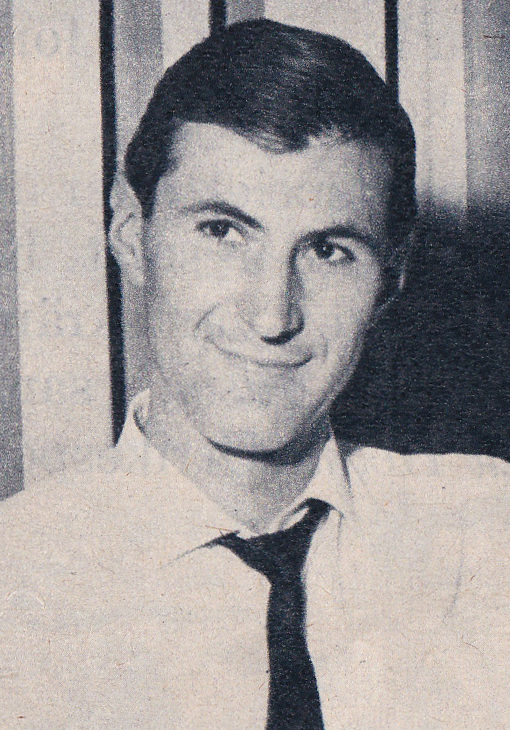

Personal information
- Date of birth: 12 April 1935
- Place of birth: Thun, Switzerland
- Date of death: 6 July 2017 (aged 82)
- Position: Defender

Senior career*
Years	Team	Apps	(Gls)
- BSC Young Boys

International career
1957–1966	Switzerland	44	(3)

Managerial career
- 1967–1969: FC Thun
- 1970–1972: BSC Young Boys
- * Club domestic league appearances and goals

Heinz Schneiter (12 April 1935 – 6 July 2017) a Swiss footballer and manager.

He got 44 caps and 3 goals for Switzerland, playing all three games at the 1962 World Cup as well as in Switzerland's 0–5 loss to West Germany at the 1966 World Cup. He scored against West Germany in the 1962 World Cup.

He coached FC Thun and BSC Young Boys.
