= Jacques Faivre =

French footballer (1932–2020)

Personal information
- Date of birth: 25 November 1932
- Place of birth: Bourg-en-Bresse, France
- Date of death: 13 August 2020 (aged 87)
- Place of death: Bourg-en-Bresse
- Position: Striker

Senior career*
Years	Team	Apps	(Gls)
1950–1952	FC Sochaux-Montbéliard	5	(1)
1952–1953	Besançon RC		
1953–1956	FC Sochaux-Montbéliard	58	(18)
1956–1960	OGC Nice	71	(22)
1960–1961	Stade Rennais	41	(20)
1961–1963	AS Saint-Étienne	40	(17)

International career
1961	France	2	(2)
- * Club domestic league appearances and goals

Jacques Faivre (25 November 1932 – 13 August 2020) was a French professional footballer. He was born in Bourg-en-Bresse.
