= Marcel Paeschen =

Belgian footballer (1937–2002)

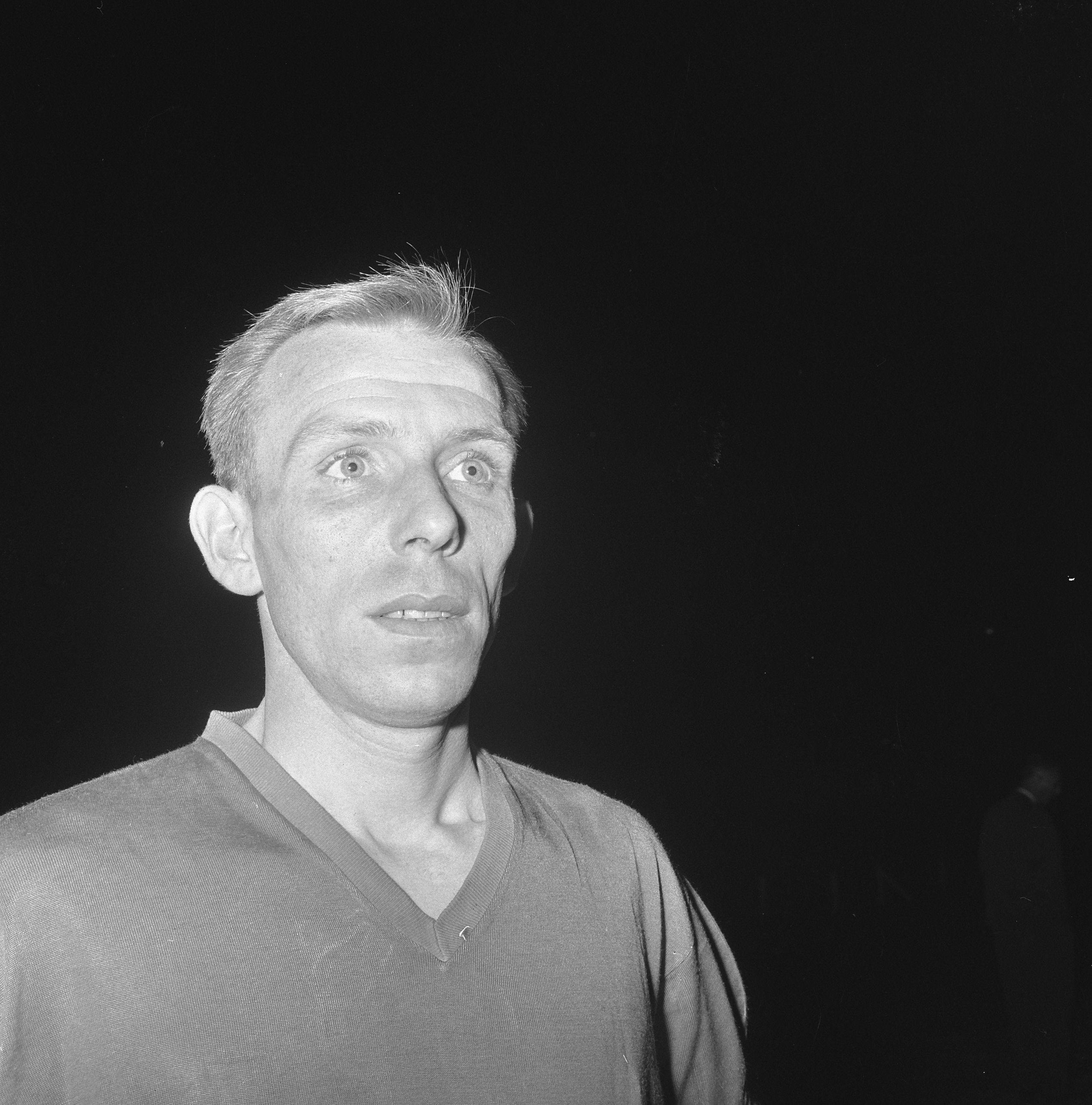
- Paeschen in 1965

Personal information
- Date of birth: 30 April 1937
- Place of birth: Ougrée, Belgium
- Date of death: 21 March 2002 (aged 64)
- Height: 1.69 m (5 ft 7 in)
- Position: Forward

Senior career*
Years	Team	Apps	(Gls)
1954–1966	Standard Liège		

International career
1957–1964	Belgium	16	(4)
- * Club domestic league appearances and goals

Marcel Paeschen (30 April 1937 – 21 March 2002) was a Belgian footballer who played as a forward for Standard Liège. He made 16 appearances for the Belgium national team from 1957 to 1964.
