= Tonny van der Linden =

Dutch footballer

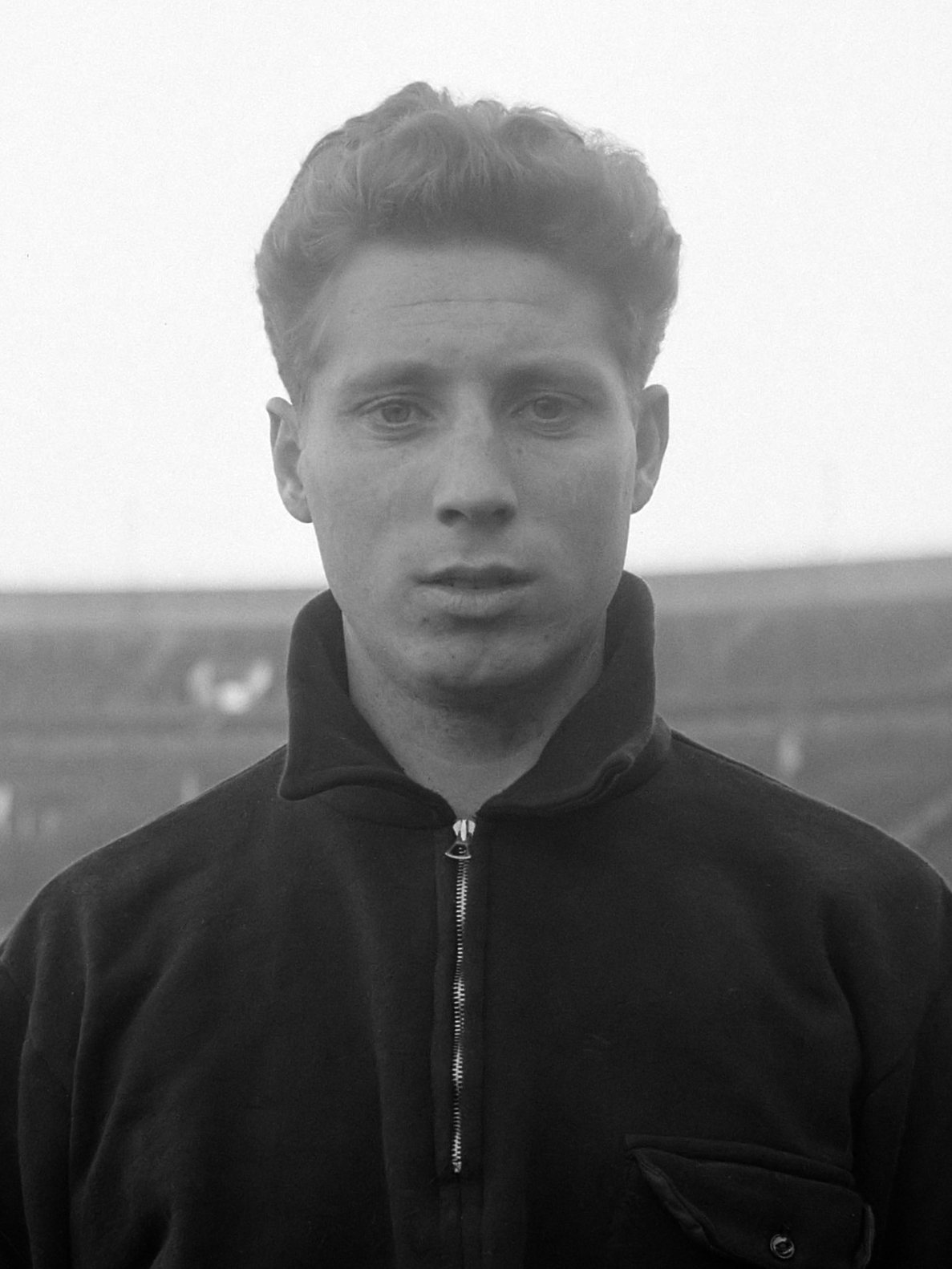
- Tonny van der Linden (1957)

Personal information
- Full name: Anthonie van der Linden
- Date of birth: 29 November 1932
- Place of birth: Zuilen, Netherlands
- Date of death: 23 June 2017 (aged 84)
- Place of death: Vianen, Netherlands
- Position: Forward

Senior career*
| Years | Team | Apps | (Gls) |
| 1954–1967 | DOS | 425 | (277) |
| 1967–1970 | Elinkwijk | 38 | (13) |

International career
| 1957–1963 | Netherlands | 24 | (17) |
- * Club domestic league appearances and goals

Anthonie "Tonny" van der Linden (19 November 1932 – 23 June 2017) was a Dutch footballer. A forward, he played for Eredivisie clubs DOS and Elinkwijk. In 1958, he won the Eredivisie title with DOS. Between 1957 and 1963, he capped 24 times for the Netherlands national team, scoring 17 goals.

Van der Linden died on 23 June 2017 at the age of 84.

== Honours ==
DOS

- Eredivisie: 1957–58
