= Albert Brülls =

German footballer (1937–2004)

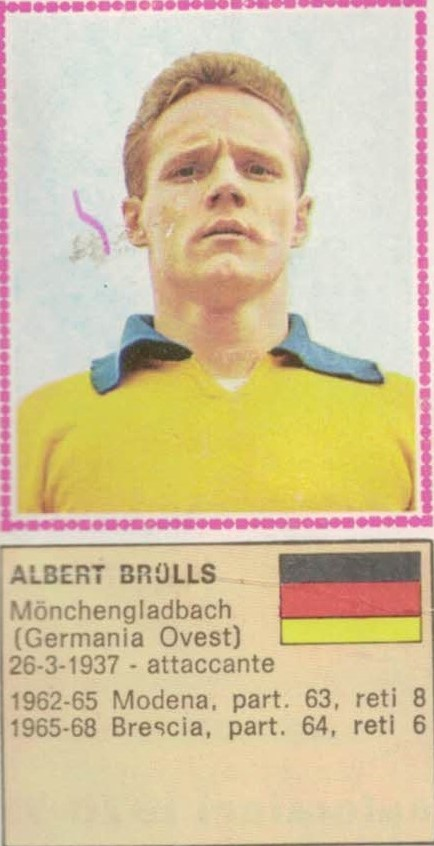

Personal information
- Date of birth: 26 March 1937
- Place of birth: Anrath, Germany
- Date of death: 28 March 2004 (aged 67)
- Place of death: Korschenbroich, Germany
- Height: 1.68 m (5 ft 6 in)
- Position: Midfielder

Senior career*
| Years | Team | Apps | (Gls) |
| 1954–1962 | Borussia Mönchengladbach | 163 | (38) |
| 1962–1965 | Modena | 63 | (7) |
| 1965–1968 | Brescia | 64 | (6) |
| 1968–1970 | Young Boys | | |
| 1970–1972 | VfR Neuss | 64 | (18) |

International career
| 1959–1966 | West Germany | 25 | (9) |

Managerial career
- 1968–1970: BSC Young Boys
- 1970–1972: VfR Neuss
Medal record
Men's football
Representing West Germany
FIFA World Cup
| Runner-up | 1966 England |
- * Club domestic league appearances and goals

Albert Brülls (26 March 1937 – 28 March 2004) was a German footballer who played 25 times for the West Germany national team, including matches in both the 1962 and 1966 FIFA World Cups.

Domestically he played for and was also captain of Borussia Mönchengladbach between 1955 and 1962. During this time he led the side to their first sporting achievement in 1960, when Borussia won the DFB-Pokal by defeating Karlsruher SC 3–2. He then went on to become one of the first Germans to play for a club side outside West Germany, transferring to the Italian team FC Modena for a fee of 100,000 marks.
