= 1958 FIFA World Cup squads =

List of football teams

Below are the squads for the 1958 FIFA World Cup final tournament in Sweden.

France (1), Northern Ireland (19), Scotland (6), Sweden (5) and Wales (14) had players representing foreign clubs.

For the first time, seven players (one French, five Swedish and one Welsh) were selected from clubs from nations that did not qualify for the tournament (Italy and Spain).

== Group 1 ==
=== West Germany ===
Head coach: Sepp Herberger

No.	Pos.	Player	Date of birth (age)	Caps	Club
1	GK	Fritz Herkenrath	9 September 1928 (aged 29)	15	(West Germany) Rot-Weiss Essen
2	DF	Herbert Erhardt	6 July 1930 (aged 27)	17	(West Germany) SpVgg Fürth
3	DF	Erich Juskowiak	7 September 1926 (aged 31)	20	(West Germany) Fortuna Düsseldorf
4	MF	Horst Eckel	8 February 1932 (aged 26)	27	(West Germany) 1. FC Kaiserslautern
5	DF	Heinz Wewers	27 July 1927 (aged 30)	11	(West Germany) Rot-Weiss Essen
6	MF	Horst Szymaniak	29 August 1934 (aged 23)	9	(West Germany) Wuppertaler SV
7	DF	Georg Stollenwerk	19 December 1930 (aged 27)	8	(West Germany) 1. FC Köln
8	FW	Helmut Rahn	16 August 1929 (aged 28)	22	(West Germany) Rot-Weiss Essen
9	MF	Fritz Walter	31 October 1920 (aged 37)	56	(West Germany) 1. FC Kaiserslautern
10	MF	Aki Schmidt	5 September 1935 (aged 22)	7	(West Germany) Borussia Dortmund
11	FW	Hans Schäfer (captain)	19 October 1927 (aged 30)	27	(West Germany) 1. FC Köln
12	FW	Uwe Seeler	5 November 1936 (aged 21)	4	(West Germany) Hamburger SV
13	FW	Bernhard Klodt	26 October 1926 (aged 31)	16	(West Germany) Schalke 04
14	FW	Hans Cieslarczyk	3 May 1937 (aged 21)	3	(West Germany) SV Sodingen
15	FW	Alfred Kelbassa	21 April 1925 (aged 33)	5	(West Germany) Borussia Dortmund
16	FW	Hans Sturm	3 September 1935 (aged 22)	1	(West Germany) 1. FC Köln
17	DF	Karl-Heinz Schnellinger	31 March 1939 (aged 19)	1	(West Germany) SG Düren 99
18	MF	Rudi Hoffmann*	11 February 1935 (aged 23)	1	(West Germany) VfB Stuttgart
19	MF	Wolfgang Peters*	8 January 1929 (aged 29)	1	(West Germany) Borussia Dortmund
20	DF	Hermann Nuber*	10 October 1935 (aged 22)	0	(West Germany) Kickers Offenbach
21	GK	Günter Sawitzki*	22 November 1932 (aged 25)	4	(West Germany) VfB Stuttgart
22	GK	Heinz Kwiatkowski	16 July 1926 (aged 31)	3	(West Germany) Borussia Dortmund

- Players no. 18-21 did not travel to Sweden.

=== Northern Ireland ===
Head coach: Peter Doherty

No.	Pos.	Player	Date of birth (age)	Caps	Club
1	GK	Harry Gregg	27 October 1932 (aged 25)	10	(England) Manchester United
2	DF	Willie Cunningham	20 February 1930 (aged 28)	16	(England) Leicester City
3	DF	Alf McMichael	1 October 1927 (aged 30)	29	(England) Newcastle United
4	MF	Danny Blanchflower (captain)	10 February 1926 (aged 32)	30	(England) Tottenham Hotspur
5	DF	Dick Keith	15 May 1933 (aged 25)	3	(England) Newcastle United
6	MF	Bertie Peacock	29 September 1928 (aged 29)	15	(Scotland) Celtic
7	FW	Billy Bingham	5 August 1931 (aged 26)	28	(England) Sunderland
8	FW	Wilbur Cush	10 June 1928 (aged 29)	11	(England) Leeds United
9	FW	Billy Simpson	12 December 1929 (aged 28)	11	(Scotland) Rangers
10	FW	Jimmy McIlroy	25 October 1931 (aged 26)	26	(England) Burnley
11	FW	Peter McParland	25 April 1934 (aged 24)	14	(England) Aston Villa
12	GK	Norman Uprichard	20 April 1928 (aged 30)	15	(England) Portsmouth
13	FW	Tommy Casey	11 March 1930 (aged 28)	8	(England) Newcastle United
14	FW	Jackie Scott	22 December 1933 (aged 24)	0	(England) Grimsby Town
15	FW	Sammy McCrory	11 October 1924 (aged 33)	1	(England) Southend United
16	FW	Derek Dougan	20 January 1938 (aged 20)	0	(England) Portsmouth
17	FW	Fay Coyle	1 April 1933 (aged 25)	3	(England) Nottingham Forest
18	GK	Roy Rea*	28 November 1934 (aged 23)	0	(Northern Ireland) Glenavon
19	DF	Len Graham*	17 October 1925 (aged 32)	13	(England) Doncaster Rovers
20	MF	Sammy Chapman*	16 February 1938 (aged 20)	0	(England) Portsmouth
21	DF	Tommy Hamill*	10 July 1933 (aged 24)	0	(Northern Ireland) Linfield
22	FW	Bobby Trainor*	25 April 1934 (aged 24)	0	(Northern Ireland) Coleraine

- Players no. 18-22 did not travel to Sweden.

=== Czechoslovakia ===
Head coach: Karel Kolský

No.	Pos.	Player	Date of birth (age)	Caps	Club
1	GK	Imrich Stacho	4 November 1931 (aged 26)	14	(Czechoslovakia) Spartak Trnava
2	DF	Gustáv Mráz	11 September 1934 (aged 23)	2	(Czechoslovakia) CH Bratislava
3	MF	Jiří Čadek	7 December 1935 (aged 22)	2	(Czechoslovakia) Dukla Prague
4	DF	Ladislav Novák (captain)	5 December 1931 (aged 26)	33	(Czechoslovakia) Dukla Prague
5	MF	Josef Masopust	9 February 1931 (aged 27)	18	(Czechoslovakia) Dukla Prague
6	DF	Svatopluk Pluskal	28 October 1930 (aged 27)	19	(Czechoslovakia) Dukla Prague
7	FW	Kazimír Gajdoš	28 March 1934 (aged 24)	4	(Czechoslovakia) CH Bratislava
8	FW	Milan Dvořák	19 November 1934 (aged 23)	6	(Czechoslovakia) Dukla Prague
9	FW	Pavol Molnár	13 February 1936 (aged 22)	7	(Czechoslovakia) CH Bratislava
10	FW	Jaroslav Borovička	26 January 1931 (aged 27)	15	(Czechoslovakia) Dukla Prague
11	FW	Tadeáš Kraus	22 October 1932 (aged 25)	21	(Czechoslovakia) Spartak Praha Sokolovo
12	FW	Zdeněk Zikán	10 November 1937 (aged 20)	1	(Czechoslovakia) Dukla Pardubice
13	FW	Václav Hovorka	19 September 1931 (aged 26)	1	(Czechoslovakia) Dynamo Praha
14	FW	Jiří Feureisl	3 October 1931 (aged 26)	8	(Czechoslovakia) Slavia Karlovy Vary
15	FW	Jan Hertl	23 January 1929 (aged 29)	22	(Czechoslovakia) Spartak Praha Sokolovo
16	DF	Ján Popluhár	12 September 1935 (aged 22)	0	(Czechoslovakia) Slovan Bratislava
17	DF	Titus Buberník	12 October 1933 (aged 24)	0	(Czechoslovakia) CH Bratislava
18	MF	Adolf Scherer	5 May 1938 (aged 20)	0	(Czechoslovakia) CH Bratislava
19	GK	Břetislav Dolejší	26 September 1928 (aged 29)	13	(Czechoslovakia) Dynamo Praha
20	MF	Anton Moravčík	3 June 1931 (aged 27)	19	(Czechoslovakia) Slovan Bratislava
21	DF	František Šafránek	2 January 1931 (aged 27)	13	(Czechoslovakia) Dukla Prague
22	GK	Viliam Schrojf	2 August 1931 (aged 26)	7	(Czechoslovakia) Slovan Bratislava

=== Argentina ===
Head coach: Guillermo Stábile

No.	Pos.	Player	Date of birth (age)	Caps	Club
1	GK	Amadeo Carrizo	12 June 1926 (aged 31)	12	(Argentina) River Plate
2	DF	Pedro Dellacha (captain)	9 July 1926 (aged 31)	32	(Argentina) Racing
3	DF	Federico Vairo	27 January 1930 (aged 28)	38	(Argentina) River Plate
4	DF	Juan Francisco Lombardo	11 June 1925 (aged 32)	27	(Argentina) Boca Juniors
5	MF	Néstor Rossi	10 May 1925 (aged 33)	23	(Argentina) River Plate
6	MF	José Varacka	27 May 1932 (aged 26)	6	(Argentina) Independiente
7	FW	Oreste Corbatta	11 March 1936 (aged 22)	24	(Argentina) Racing
8	FW	Eliseo Prado	17 September 1929 (aged 28)	6	(Argentina) River Plate
9	FW	Norberto Menéndez	14 December 1936 (aged 21)	7	(Argentina) River Plate
10	FW	Alfredo Rojas	20 February 1937 (aged 21)	2	(Argentina) Lanús
11	FW	Ángel Labruna	28 September 1918 (aged 39)	35	(Argentina) River Plate
12	GK	Julio Musimessi	9 July 1924 (aged 33)	16	(Argentina) Boca Juniors
13	DF	Alfredo Pérez	10 April 1929 (aged 29)	3	(Argentina) River Plate
14	DF	Federico Edwards	25 January 1931 (aged 27)	0	(Argentina) Boca Juniors
15	DF	David Acevedo	20 February 1937 (aged 21)	0	(Argentina) Independiente
16	MF	Eliseo Mouriño	3 June 1927 (aged 31)	19	(Argentina) Boca Juniors
17	DF	José Ramos Delgado	25 August 1935 (aged 22)	1	(Argentina) Lanús
18	FW	Norberto Boggio	11 August 1931 (aged 26)	1	(Argentina) San Lorenzo
19	FW	Ludovico Avio	6 October 1932 (aged 25)	0	(Argentina) Vélez Sarsfield
20	FW	Ricardo Infante	21 June 1924 (aged 33)	4	(Argentina) Estudiantes (LP)
21	FW	José Sanfilippo	4 May 1935 (aged 23)	10	(Argentina) San Lorenzo
22	FW	Osvaldo Cruz	29 May 1931 (aged 27)	23	(Argentina) Independiente

== Group 2 ==
=== France ===
Head coach: Albert Batteux

No.	Pos.	Player	Date of birth (age)	Caps	Club
1	GK	Claude Abbes	24 May 1927 (aged 31)	3	(France) Saint-Étienne
2	GK	Dominique Colonna	4 September 1928 (aged 29)	3	(France) Reims
3	GK	François Remetter	8 August 1928 (aged 29)	23	(France) Bordeaux
4	DF	Raymond Kaelbel	31 January 1932 (aged 26)	17	(France) Monaco
5	DF	André Lerond	6 December 1930 (aged 27)	4	(France) Lyon
6	DF	Roger Marche (captain)	5 March 1924 (aged 34)	55	(France) RC Paris
7	DF	Robert Mouynet	25 March 1930 (aged 28)	0	(France) Lyon
8	MF	Bernard Chiarelli	24 February 1934 (aged 24)	1	(France) Valenciennes
9	MF	Kazimir Hnatow	9 January 1929 (aged 29)	0	(France) Angers
10	MF	Robert Jonquet	3 May 1925 (aged 33)	46	(France) Reims
11	MF	Maurice Lafont	13 September 1927 (aged 30)	0	(France) Nîmes
12	MF	Jean-Jacques Marcel	13 June 1931 (aged 26)	25	(France) Marseille
13	DF	Armand Penverne	26 November 1926 (aged 31)	26	(France) Reims
14	MF	Raymond Bellot	9 June 1929 (aged 28)	0	(France) Monaco
15	FW	Stéphane Bruey	11 December 1932 (aged 25)	2	(France) Angers
16	FW	Yvon Douis	16 May 1935 (aged 23)	3	(France) Lille
17	FW	Just Fontaine	18 August 1933 (aged 24)	5	(France) Reims
18	MF	Raymond Kopa	13 October 1931 (aged 26)	24	(Spain) Real Madrid
19	MF	Célestin Oliver	12 July 1930 (aged 27)	5	(France) Sedan
20	FW	Roger Piantoni	26 December 1931 (aged 26)	25	(France) Reims
21	FW	Jean Vincent	29 November 1930 (aged 27)	22	(France) Reims
22	FW	Maryan Wisnieski	1 February 1937 (aged 21)	9	(France) Lens

=== Yugoslavia ===
Head coach: Aleksandar Tirnanić

No.	Pos.	Player	Date of birth (age)	Caps	Club
1	GK	Vladimir Beara	2 November 1928 (aged 29)	53	(Socialist Federal Republic of Yugoslavia) Red Star Belgrade
2	GK	Srboljub Krivokuća	14 March 1928 (aged 30)	4	(Socialist Federal Republic of Yugoslavia) Vojvodina Novi Sad
3	DF	Vasilije Šijaković	31 July 1929 (aged 28)	3	(Socialist Federal Republic of Yugoslavia) OFK Belgrade
4	DF	Tomislav Crnković	17 June 1929 (aged 28)	38	(Socialist Federal Republic of Yugoslavia) Dinamo Zagreb
5	DF	Novak Tomić	7 January 1936 (aged 22)	0	(Socialist Federal Republic of Yugoslavia) Red Star Belgrade
6	DF	Branko Zebec (captain)	17 May 1929 (aged 29)	48	(Socialist Federal Republic of Yugoslavia) Partizan Belgrade
7	FW	Miloš Milutinović	5 February 1933 (aged 25)	30	(Socialist Federal Republic of Yugoslavia) Partizan Belgrade
8	MF	Dobrosav Krstić	5 February 1932 (aged 26)	22	(Socialist Federal Republic of Yugoslavia) Vojvodina Novi Sad
9	MF	Vujadin Boškov	16 May 1931 (aged 27)	53	(Socialist Federal Republic of Yugoslavia) Vojvodina Novi Sad
10	MF	Ivan Šantek	23 April 1932 (aged 26)	5	(Socialist Federal Republic of Yugoslavia) Dinamo Zagreb
11	DF	Vladimir Popović	17 March 1935 (aged 23)	1	(Socialist Federal Republic of Yugoslavia) Red Star Belgrade
12	FW	Aleksandar Petaković	6 February 1930 (aged 28)	11	(Socialist Federal Republic of Yugoslavia) Radnički Belgrade
13	FW	Todor Veselinović	22 October 1930 (aged 27)	26	(Socialist Federal Republic of Yugoslavia) Vojvodina Novi Sad
14	DF	Milorad Milutinović	10 March 1935 (aged 23)	0	(Socialist Federal Republic of Yugoslavia) Partizan Belgrade
15	MF	Dragoslav Šekularac	8 November 1937 (aged 20)	5	(Socialist Federal Republic of Yugoslavia) Red Star Belgrade
16	FW	Ilijas Pašić	10 May 1934 (aged 24)	7	(Socialist Federal Republic of Yugoslavia) Željezničar Sarajevo
17	MF	Zdravko Rajkov	5 December 1927 (aged 30)	24	(Socialist Federal Republic of Yugoslavia) Vojvodina Novi Sad
18	FW	Luka Lipošinović	12 May 1933 (aged 25)	6	(Socialist Federal Republic of Yugoslavia) Dinamo Zagreb
19	FW	Radivoje Ognjanović	1 July 1933 (aged 24)	1	(Socialist Federal Republic of Yugoslavia) Radnički Belgrade
20	GK	Gordan Irović	2 July 1934 (aged 23)	0	(Socialist Federal Republic of Yugoslavia) Dinamo Zagreb
21	DF	Nikola Radović	10 March 1933 (aged 25)	3	(Socialist Federal Republic of Yugoslavia) Hajduk Split
22	FW	Dražan Jerković	6 August 1936 (aged 21)	1	(Socialist Federal Republic of Yugoslavia) Dinamo Zagreb

Players no. 20-22 did not travel to Sweden.

=== Paraguay ===
Head coach: Aurelio González

No.	Pos.	Player	Date of birth (age)	Caps	Club
1	GK	Ramón Mayeregger	5 March 1936 (aged 22)	0	(Paraguay) Nacional
2	DF	Edelmiro Arévalo	7 January 1929 (aged 29)	0	(Paraguay) Olimpia
3	MF	Juan Vicente Lezcano	5 April 1937 (aged 21)	?	(Paraguay) Olimpia
4	DF	Ignacio Achúcarro	31 July 1936 (aged 21)	0	(Paraguay) Olimpia
5	MF	Salvador Villalba	29 August 1924 (aged 33)	0	(Paraguay) Libertad
6	DF	Eligio Echagüe	31 December 1938 (aged 19)	0	(Paraguay) Olimpia
7	FW	Juan Bautista Agüero (captain)	24 June 1935 (aged 22)	0	(Paraguay) Olimpia
8	FW	José Parodi	30 August 1932 (aged 25)	0	(Paraguay) Sportivo Luqueño
9	FW	Jorge Lino Romero	23 September 1937 (aged 20)	0	(Paraguay) Sol de América
10	FW	Oscar Aguilera	11 March 1935 (aged 23)	?	(Paraguay) Olimpia
11	FW	Florencio Amarilla	3 January 1935 (aged 23)	0	(Paraguay) Nacional
12	GK	Samuel Aguilar	16 March 1933 (aged 25)	0	(Paraguay) Libertad
13	DF	Luis Gini	31 October 1935 (aged 22)	?	(Paraguay) Sol de América
14	DF	Darío Segovia	18 March 1932 (aged 26)	?	(Paraguay) Sol de América
15	MF	Luis Santos Silva		?	(Paraguay) Cerro Porteño
16	FW	Claudio Lezcano		0	(Paraguay) Olimpia
17	DF	Agustín Miranda	1 January 1930 (aged 28)	0	(Paraguay) Cerro Porteño
18	FW	Gilberto Penayo	3 April 1933 (aged 25)	0	(Paraguay) Sol de América
19	FW	Eliseo Insfrán	27 October 1935 (aged 22)	0	(Paraguay) Guaraní
20	FW	José Raúl Aveiro	18 July 1936 (aged 21)	?	(Paraguay) Sportivo Luqueño
21	FW	Cayetano Ré	7 February 1938 (aged 20)	0	(Paraguay) Cerro Porteño
22	FW	Eligio Insfrán	27 October 1935 (aged 22)	?	(Paraguay) Guaraní

=== Scotland ===
Head coach: Dawson Walker (officially only acting manager in place of Matt Busby, who was seriously injured in the Munich air disaster and unable to resume his duties in time for the tournament)

No.	Pos.	Player	Date of birth (age)	Caps	Club
1	GK	Tommy Younger (captain)	10 April 1930 (aged 28)	22	(England) Liverpool
2	GK	Bill Brown	8 October 1931 (aged 26)	0	(Scotland) Dundee
3	DF	Alex Parker	2 August 1935 (aged 22)	14	(England) Everton
4	DF	Eric Caldow	14 May 1934 (aged 24)	10	(Scotland) Rangers
5	DF	John Hewie	13 December 1927 (aged 30)	12	(England) Charlton Athletic
6	DF	Harry Haddock	26 July 1925 (aged 32)	6	(Scotland) Clyde
7	DF	Ian McColl	7 June 1927 (aged 31)	14	(Scotland) Rangers
8	MF	Eddie Turnbull	12 April 1923 (aged 35)	6	(Scotland) Hibernian
9	DF	Bobby Evans	16 July 1927 (aged 30)	34	(Scotland) Celtic
10	MF	Tommy Docherty	24 April 1928 (aged 30)	22	(England) Preston North End
11	MF	Dave Mackay	14 November 1934 (aged 23)	1	(Scotland) Heart of Midlothian
12	MF	Doug Cowie	1 May 1926 (aged 32)	18	(Scotland) Dundee
13	FW	Sammy Baird	13 May 1930 (aged 28)	6	(Scotland) Rangers
14	FW	Graham Leggat	20 June 1934 (aged 23)	5	(Scotland) Aberdeen
15	FW	Alex Scott	22 November 1936 (aged 21)	5	(Scotland) Rangers
16	FW	Jimmy Murray	4 February 1933 (aged 25)	3	(Scotland) Heart of Midlothian
17	FW	Jackie Mudie	10 April 1930 (aged 28)	14	(England) Blackpool
18	FW	John Coyle	28 September 1932 (aged 25)	0	(Scotland) Clyde
19	FW	Bobby Collins	16 February 1931 (aged 27)	19	(Scotland) Celtic
20	FW	Archie Robertson	15 September 1929 (aged 28)	4	(Scotland) Clyde
21	FW	Stewart Imlach	6 January 1932 (aged 26)	2	(England) Nottingham Forest
22	FW	Willie Fernie	22 November 1928 (aged 29)	11	(Scotland) Celtic

== Group 3 ==
=== Sweden ===
Head coach: (England) George Raynor

No.	Pos.	Player	Date of birth (age)	Caps	Club
1	GK	Kalle Svensson	11 November 1925 (aged 32)	67	(Sweden) Helsingborg
2	DF	Orvar Bergmark	16 November 1930 (aged 27)	37	(Sweden) Örebro
3	DF	Sven Axbom	15 October 1926 (aged 31)	16	(Sweden) Norrköping
4	MF	Nils Liedholm (captain)	8 October 1922 (aged 35)	18	(Italy) Milan
5	DF	Åke Johansson	19 March 1928 (aged 30)	16	(Sweden) Norrköping
6	MF	Sigge Parling	26 March 1930 (aged 28)	20	(Sweden) Djurgården
7	MF	Kurt Hamrin	19 November 1934 (aged 23)	20	(Italy) Padova
8	FW	Gunnar Gren	31 October 1920 (aged 37)	49	(Sweden) Örgryte
9	FW	Agne Simonsson	19 October 1935 (aged 22)	3	(Sweden) Örgryte
10	FW	Arne Selmosson	29 March 1931 (aged 27)	3	(Italy) Lazio
11	MF	Lennart Skoglund	24 December 1929 (aged 28)	4	(Italy) Inter Milan
12	GK	Tore Svensson	6 December 1927 (aged 30)	1	(Sweden) Malmö
13	DF	Prawitz Öberg	16 November 1930 (aged 27)	3	(Sweden) Malmö
14	DF	Bengt Gustavsson	15 January 1928 (aged 30)	42	(Italy) Atalanta
15	MF	Reino Börjesson	4 February 1929 (aged 29)	3	(Sweden) Norrby
16	GK	Ingemar Haraldsson	3 February 1928 (aged 30)	0	(Sweden) Elfsborg
17	MF	Olle Håkansson	22 February 1927 (aged 31)	7	(Sweden) Norrköping
18	FW	Gösta Löfgren	29 August 1923 (aged 34)	38	(Sweden) Motala
19	FW	Henry Källgren	13 March 1931 (aged 27)	6	(Sweden) Norrköping
20	FW	Bror Mellberg	9 December 1923 (aged 34)	3	(Sweden) AIK
21	MF	Bengt Berndtsson	26 January 1933 (aged 25)	4	(Sweden) Göteborg
22	FW	Owe Ohlsson	19 August 1938 (aged 19)	1	(Sweden) Göteborg

=== Wales ===
Head coach: Jimmy Murphy

Note: Swansea Town (now Swansea City) and Cardiff City are Welsh clubs that play in the English football league system.

No.	Pos.	Player	Date of birth (age)	Caps	Club
1	GK	Jack Kelsey	19 November 1929 (aged 28)	20	(England) Arsenal
2	DF	Stuart Williams	9 July 1930 (aged 27)	11	(England) West Bromwich Albion
3	DF	Mel Hopkins	7 November 1934 (aged 23)	13	(England) Tottenham Hotspur
4	DF	Derrick Sullivan	10 August 1930 (aged 27)	9	(Wales) Cardiff City
5	MF	Mel Charles	14 May 1935 (aged 23)	14	(Wales) Swansea Town
6	MF	Dave Bowen (captain)	7 June 1928 (aged 30)	11	(England) Arsenal
7	FW	Terry Medwin	25 September 1932 (aged 25)	14	(England) Tottenham Hotspur
8	FW	Ron Hewitt	21 June 1928 (aged 29)	2	(Wales) Cardiff City
9	FW	John Charles	27 December 1931 (aged 26)	25	(Italy) Juventus
10	FW	Ivor Allchurch	16 October 1929 (aged 28)	30	(Wales) Swansea Town
11	FW	Cliff Jones	7 February 1935 (aged 23)	17	(England) Tottenham Hotspur
12	GK	Ken Jones	2 January 1936 (aged 22)	0	(Wales) Cardiff City
13	GK	Graham Vearncombe	28 March 1934 (aged 24)	1	(Wales) Cardiff City
14	DF	Trevor Edwards	24 January 1937 (aged 21)	2	(England) Charlton Athletic
15	DF	Colin Baker	18 December 1934 (aged 23)	0	(Wales) Cardiff City
16	MF	Vic Crowe	31 January 1932 (aged 26)	0	(England) Aston Villa
17	FW	Ken Leek	26 July 1935 (aged 22)	0	(England) Leicester City
18	FW	Roy Vernon	14 April 1937 (aged 21)	7	(England) Blackburn Rovers
19	FW	Colin Webster	17 July 1932 (aged 25)	1	(England) Manchester United
20	MF	John Elsworthy	26 July 1931 (aged 26)	0	(England) Ipswich Town
21	MF	Len Allchurch	12 September 1933 (aged 24)	6	(Wales) Swansea Town
22	MF	George Baker	6 April 1936 (aged 22)	0	(England) Plymouth Argyle

=== Hungary ===
Head coach: Lajos Baróti

No.	Pos.	Player	Date of birth (age)	Caps	Club
1	GK	Gyula Grosics	4 February 1926 (aged 32)	52	(Hungary) Tatabányai Bányász SE
2	DF	Sándor Mátrai	20 November 1932 (aged 25)	10	(Hungary) Ferencvárosi TC
3	DF	Ferenc Sipos	13 December 1932 (aged 25)	7	(Hungary) MTK FC
4	DF	László Sárosi	27 February 1932 (aged 26)	5	(Hungary) Vasas SC
5	DF	József Bozsik	28 November 1925 (aged 32)	88	(Hungary) Budapest Honvéd FC
6	MF	Pál Berendy	30 November 1932 (aged 25)	15	(Hungary) Vasas SC
7	MF	László Budai	19 July 1928 (aged 29)	31	(Hungary) Budapest Honvéd FC
8	FW	Lajos Tichy	21 March 1935 (aged 23)	19	(Hungary) Budapest Honvéd FC
9	FW	Nándor Hidegkuti (captain)	3 March 1922 (aged 36)	67	(Hungary) MTK FC
10	FW	Dezső Bundzsák	3 May 1928 (aged 30)	6	(Hungary) Vasas SC
11	FW	Károly Sándor	29 November 1928 (aged 29)	29	(Hungary) MTK FC
12	DF	Béla Kárpáti	30 September 1929 (aged 28)	17	(Hungary) Vasas SC
13	DF	Oszkár Szigeti	10 September 1933 (aged 24)	1	(Hungary) Diósgyőri VTK
14	FW	Ferenc Szojka	7 April 1931 (aged 27)	23	(Hungary) Salgótarjáni BTC
15	MF	Antal Kotász	1 September 1929 (aged 28)	15	(Hungary) Budapest Honvéd FC
16	FW	László Lachos	17 January 1933 (aged 25)	0	(Hungary) Tatabányai Bányász SE
17	FW	Mihály Vasas	14 September 1933 (aged 24)	1	(Hungary) Salgótarjáni BTC
18	FW	Tivadar Monostori	24 August 1936 (aged 21)	1	(Hungary) Dorogi Bányász
19	FW	Zoltán Friedmanszky	22 October 1934 (aged 23)	0	(Hungary) Ferencvárosi TC
20	FW	József Bencsics	6 August 1933 (aged 24)	1	(Hungary) Újpesti Dózsa
21	FW	Máté Fenyvesi	20 September 1933 (aged 24)	18	(Hungary) Ferencvárosi TC
22	GK	István Ilku	6 March 1933 (aged 25)	4	(Hungary) Dorogi Bányász

=== Mexico ===
Head coach: (Spain) Antonio López Herranz

No.	Pos.	Player	Date of birth (age)	Caps	Club
1	GK	Antonio Carbajal (captain)	7 June 1929 (aged 29)	18	(Mexico) León
2	DF	Jesús del Muro	30 November 1937 (aged 20)	0	(Mexico) Atlas
3	MF	Jorge Romo	20 April 1923 (aged 35)	10	(Mexico) Toluca
4	DF	José Villegas	20 June 1934 (aged 23)	8	(Mexico) Guadalajara
5	DF	Alfonso Portugal	21 January 1934 (aged 24)	8	(Mexico) Necaxa
6	MF	Francisco Flores	12 February 1926 (aged 32)	0	(Mexico) Guadalajara
7	MF	Alfredo Hernández	18 June 1935 (aged 22)	4	(Mexico) León
8	FW	Salvador Reyes	20 September 1936 (aged 21)	8	(Mexico) Guadalajara
9	FW	Carlos Calderón de la Barca	2 October 1934 (aged 23)	7	(Mexico) Atlante
10	FW	Crescencio Gutiérrez	26 October 1933 (aged 24)	4	(Mexico) Guadalajara
11	FW	Enrique Sesma	22 April 1927 (aged 31)	7	(Mexico) Toluca
12	GK	Manuel Camacho	29 April 1929 (aged 29)	1	(Mexico) Toluca
13	GK	Jaime Gómez	29 December 1929 (aged 28)	5	(Mexico) Guadalajara
14	FW	Miguel Gutiérrez	7 May 1931 (aged 27)	4	(Mexico) Atlas
15	MF	Guillermo Sepúlveda	28 February 1934 (aged 24)	1	(Mexico) Guadalajara
16	DF	José Antonio Roca	24 May 1928 (aged 30)	10	(Mexico) Zacatepec
17	DF	Raúl Cárdenas	30 October 1928 (aged 29)	9	(Mexico) Zacatepec
18	MF	Jaime Salazar	6 February 1931 (aged 27)	8	(Mexico) Necaxa
19	DF	Jaime Belmonte	8 October 1934 (aged 23)	2	(Mexico) Cuautla
20	FW	Carlos Blanco	5 March 1927 (aged 31)	6	(Mexico) Toluca
21	FW	Ligorio López	3 July 1933 (aged 24)	7	(Mexico) Irapuato
22	FW	Carlos González	12 April 1935 (aged 23)	3	(Mexico) Atlas

== Group 4 ==
=== Brazil ===
Head coach: Vicente Feola

No.	Pos.	Player	Date of birth (age)	Caps	Club
1	GK	Castilho	27 November 1927 (aged 30)	20	(Brazil) Fluminense
2	DF	Hilderaldo Bellini (captain)	7 June 1930 (aged 28)	8	(Brazil) Vasco da Gama
3	GK	Gilmar	22 August 1930 (aged 27)	31	(Brazil) Corinthians
4	DF	Djalma Santos	27 February 1929 (aged 29)	47	(Brazil) Portuguesa
5	MF	Dino Sani	23 May 1932 (aged 26)	5	(Brazil) São Paulo
6	MF	Didi	8 October 1928 (aged 29)	41	(Brazil) Botafogo
7	FW	Mário Zagallo	9 August 1931 (aged 26)	3	(Brazil) Flamengo
8	DF	Oreco	13 June 1932 (aged 25)	9	(Brazil) Corinthians
9	DF	Zózimo	19 June 1932 (aged 25)	26	(Brazil) Bangu
10	FW	Pelé	23 October 1940 (aged 17)	5	(Brazil) Santos
11	FW	Garrincha	28 October 1933 (aged 24)	8	(Brazil) Botafogo
12	DF	Nílton Santos	16 May 1925 (aged 33)	46	(Brazil) Botafogo
13	MF	Moacir	18 May 1936 (aged 22)	5	(Brazil) Flamengo
14	DF	De Sordi	14 February 1931 (aged 27)	14	(Brazil) São Paulo
15	DF	Orlando	20 September 1935 (aged 22)	1	(Brazil) Vasco da Gama
16	DF	Mauro Ramos	30 August 1930 (aged 27)	10	(Brazil) São Paulo
17	FW	Joel Antônio Martins	11 November 1931 (aged 26)	11	(Brazil) Flamengo
18	FW	José Altafini	24 July 1938 (aged 19)	5	(Brazil) Palmeiras
19	MF	Zito	18 August 1932 (aged 25)	8	(Brazil) Santos
20	FW	Vavá	12 November 1934 (aged 23)	4	(Brazil) Vasco da Gama
21	FW	Dida	26 March 1934 (aged 24)	3	(Brazil) Flamengo
22	FW	Pepe	25 February 1935 (aged 23)	11	(Brazil) Santos

=== Soviet Union ===
Head coach: Gavriil Kachalin

No.	Pos.	Player	Date of birth (age)	Caps	Club
1	GK	Lev Yashin	22 October 1929 (aged 28)	22	(Soviet Union) Dynamo Moscow
2	DF	Vladimir Kesarev	26 February 1930 (aged 28)	2	(Soviet Union) Dynamo Moscow
3	MF	Konstantin Krizhevsky	20 February 1926 (aged 32)	9	(Soviet Union) Dynamo Moscow
4	DF	Boris Kuznetsov	14 July 1928 (aged 29)	15	(Soviet Union) Dynamo Moscow
5	DF	Yuri Voinov	29 November 1931 (aged 26)	9	(Soviet Union) Dynamo Kyiv
6	MF	Igor Netto	9 January 1930 (aged 28)	30	(Soviet Union) Spartak Moscow
7	FW	German Apukhtin	12 June 1936 (aged 21)	2	(Soviet Union) CSKA Moscow
8	FW	Valentin Ivanov	19 November 1934 (aged 23)	15	(Soviet Union) Torpedo Moscow
9	FW	Nikita Simonyan (captain)	12 October 1926 (aged 31)	13	(Soviet Union) Spartak Moscow
10	FW	Sergei Salnikov	13 September 1925 (aged 32)	17	(Soviet Union) Spartak Moscow
11	FW	Anatoli Ilyin	27 June 1931 (aged 26)	22	(Soviet Union) Spartak Moscow
12	GK	Vladimir Maslachenko	5 March 1936 (aged 22)	0	(Soviet Union) Lokomotiv Moscow
13	GK	Vladimir Belyayev	15 September 1933 (aged 24)	2	(Soviet Union) Dynamo Moscow
14	DF	Leonid Ostrovskiy	17 January 1936 (aged 22)	0	(Soviet Union) Torpedo Moscow
15	DF	Anatoli Maslyonkin	26 June 1930 (aged 27)	8	(Soviet Union) Spartak Moscow
16	MF	Viktor Tsarev	2 June 1931 (aged 27)	1	(Soviet Union) Dynamo Moscow
17	FW	Aleksandr Ivanov	14 April 1928 (aged 30)	0	(Soviet Union) Zenit Leningrad
18	FW	Valentin Bubukin	23 April 1933 (aged 25)	0	(Soviet Union) Lokomotiv Moscow
19	FW	Gennadi Gusarov	11 March 1937 (aged 21)	0	(Soviet Union) Torpedo Moscow
20	FW	Yuri Falin	2 April 1937 (aged 21)	1	(Soviet Union) Torpedo Moscow
21	FW	Genrich Fedosov	6 December 1932 (aged 25)	1	(Soviet Union) Dynamo Moscow
22	DF	Vladimir Yerokhin	10 April 1930 (aged 28)	0	(Soviet Union) Dynamo Kyiv

=== England ===
Head coach: Walter Winterbottom

No.	Pos.	Player	Date of birth (age)	Caps	Club
1	GK	Colin McDonald	15 October 1930 (aged 27)	1	(England) Burnley
2	DF	Don Howe	12 October 1935 (aged 22)	7	(England) West Bromwich Albion
3	DF	Tommy Banks	10 November 1929 (aged 28)	1	(England) Bolton Wanderers
4	MF	Eddie Clamp	14 September 1934 (aged 23)	1	(England) Wolverhampton Wanderers
5	DF	Billy Wright (captain)	6 February 1924 (aged 34)	92	(England) Wolverhampton Wanderers
6	MF	Bill Slater	29 April 1927 (aged 31)	6	(England) Wolverhampton Wanderers
7	FW	Bryan Douglas	27 May 1934 (aged 24)	7	(England) Blackburn Rovers
8	FW	Bobby Robson	18 February 1933 (aged 25)	2	(England) West Bromwich Albion
9	FW	Derek Kevan	6 March 1935 (aged 23)	7	(England) West Bromwich Albion
10	FW	Johnny Haynes	17 October 1934 (aged 23)	20	(England) Fulham
11	FW	Tom Finney	5 April 1922 (aged 36)	73	(England) Preston North End
12	GK	Eddie Hopkinson	29 October 1935 (aged 22)	6	(England) Bolton Wanderers
13	GK	Alan Hodgkinson*	16 August 1936 (aged 21)	4	(England) Sheffield United
14	DF	Peter Sillett	1 February 1933 (aged 25)	3	(England) Chelsea
15	MF	Ronnie Clayton	5 August 1934 (aged 23)	20	(England) Blackburn Rovers
16	DF	Maurice Norman	8 May 1934 (aged 24)	0	(England) Tottenham Hotspur
17	FW	Peter Brabrook	8 November 1937 (aged 20)	0	(England) Chelsea
18	FW	Peter Broadbent	15 May 1933 (aged 25)	0	(England) Wolverhampton Wanderers
19	FW	Bobby Smith	22 February 1933 (aged 25)	0	(England) Tottenham Hotspur
20	FW	Bobby Charlton	11 October 1937 (aged 20)	3	(England) Manchester United
21	FW	Alan A'Court	30 September 1934 (aged 23)	1	(England) Liverpool
22	MF	Maurice Setters*	16 December 1936 (aged 21)	0	(England) West Bromwich Albion

- Some sources state that England took only 20 squad members to the 1958 tournament in Sweden, and their squad lists do not include Alan Hodgkinson or Maurice Setters. Other sources, including FIFA's official World Cup records, list 22 players on the squad and include both Hodgkinson and Setters. The likelihood is that these two players were included on the squad list submitted to FIFA but did not travel to the tournament.

=== Austria ===
Head coach: Josef Argauer

No.	Pos.	Player	Date of birth (age)	Caps	Club
1	GK	Rudolf Szanwald	6 July 1931 (aged 26)	2	(Austria) Wiener SC
2	DF	Paul Halla	10 April 1931 (aged 27)	21	(Austria) SK Rapid Wien
3	DF	Ernst Happel	29 November 1925 (aged 32)	48	(Austria) SK Rapid Wien
4	DF	Franz Swoboda	15 February 1933 (aged 25)	13	Austria Wien
5	DF	Gerhard Hanappi (captain)	16 February 1929 (aged 29)	67	(Austria) SK Rapid Wien
6	MF	Karl Koller	8 February 1929 (aged 29)	39	(Austria) First Vienna FC
7	FW	Walter Horak	1 June 1931 (aged 27)	2	(Austria) Wiener SC
8	FW	Paul Kozlicek	22 July 1937 (aged 20)	5	(Austria) Wacker Wien
9	FW	Hans Buzek	22 May 1938 (aged 20)	12	(Austria) First Vienna FC
10	FW	Alfred Körner	14 February 1926 (aged 32)	42	(Austria) SK Rapid Wien
11	FW	Helmut Senekowitsch	22 October 1933 (aged 24)	4	(Austria) SK Sturm Graz
12	GK	Kurt Schmied	14 June 1926 (aged 31)	24	(Austria) First Vienna FC
13	FW	Walter Schleger	19 September 1929 (aged 28)	20	Austria Wien
14	FW	Josef Hamerl	22 January 1931 (aged 27)	2	(Austria) Wiener SC
15	DF	Walter Kollmann	17 June 1932 (aged 25)	14	(Austria) Wacker Wien
16	MF	Karl Stotz	27 March 1927 (aged 31)	22	Austria Wien
17	MF	Ernst Kozlicek	27 January 1931 (aged 27)	9	(Austria) Wacker Wien
18	DF	Leopold Barschandt	12 August 1925 (aged 32)	21	(Austria) Wiener SC
19	FW	Robert Dienst	1 March 1928 (aged 30)	27	(Austria) SK Rapid Wien
20	FW	Herbert Ninaus	31 March 1937 (aged 21)	0	(Austria) Grazer AK
21	MF	Ignaz Puschnik	5 February 1934 (aged 24)	1	(Austria) Kapfenberger SV
22	GK	Bruno Engelmeier	5 September 1927 (aged 30)	9	(Austria) 1. Simmeringer SC

== Notes ==
Each national team had to submit a squad of 22 players. All the teams included 3 goalkeepers, except Argentina, Paraguay, Scotland, Hungary and Brazil who only called two.

== Coaches representation by country ==
Nº	Country	Coaches
2	England	George Raynor (Sweden), Walter Winterbottom
1	Argentina	Guillermo Stábile
1	Austria	Karl Argauer
1	Brazil	Vicente Feola
1	Czechoslovakia	Karel Kolský
1	France	Albert Batteux
1	Hungary	Lajos Baróti
1	Northern Ireland	Peter Doherty
1	Paraguay	Aurelio González
1	Scotland	Dawson Walker
1	Soviet Union	Gavriil Kachalin
1	Spain	Antonio López Herranz (Mexico)
1	Wales	Jimmy Murphy
1	West Germany	Sepp Herberger
1	(Socialist Federal Republic of Yugoslavia) Yugoslavia	Aleksandar Tirnanić
