= 1962 FIFA World Cup qualification (CAF) =

African qualification of the 1962 FIFA World Cup

Tournament details
- Dates: 28 August 1960 – 28 May 1961
- Teams: 4

Tournament statistics
- Matches played: 7
- Goals scored: 18 (2.57 per match)
- Attendance: 134,539 (19,220 per match)
- Top scorer: (Ghana) Edward Acquah (3 goals)

The African section of the 1962 FIFA World Cup qualification saw six teams enter but only four compete for a partial spot at the final tournament.

== Format ==
The format consisted of two rounds:

- First Round: The 6 teams were divided into 3 groups of 2 teams each. The teams played against each other on a home-and-away basis. The group winners would advance to the Final Round.
- Second Round: The 3 teams played against each other on a home-and-away basis. The group winner would advance to the UEFA/CAF Intercontinental Play-off.

== Results ==
=== First round ===
==== Group 1 ====
Sudan and the United Arab Republic both withdrew; the Group was scratched.

==== Group 2 ====
Pos	Team	Pld	W	D	L	GF	GA	GD	Pts	Qualification	Morocco national football team	Tunisia national football team
1	Morocco	2	1	0	1	3	3	0	2	Teams finished on level points and played a play-off on a neutral ground	—	2–1
2	Tunisia	2	1	0	1	3	3	0	2	Teams finished on level points and played a play-off on a neutral ground	2–1	—

Source: RSSSF
30 October 1960

Morocco	2–1	Tunisia
Khalfi 33'; Azhar 60' (pen.)	Report	Meddeb 43'

Stade d'Honneur, Casablanca, Morocco
Attendance: 12,360
Referee: Blanco Perez (Spain)

13 November 1960

Tunisia	2–1	Morocco
Chetali 47'; Tlemçani 60'	Report	Chicha 64'

Stade Géo André, Tunis, Tunisia
Attendance: 10,000
Referee: Carl Erich Steiner (Austria)

===== Play-off =====
22 January 1961

Morocco	1–1 (a.e.t.) Morocco won on coin toss	Tunisia
Azhar 36'	Report	Kerrit 89'

Stadio La Favorita, Palermo, Italy
Attendance: 8,000
Referee: Lo Bello (Italy)

==== Group 3 ====
Pos	Team	Pld	W	D	L	GF	GA	GD	Pts	Qualification	Ghana national football team	Nigeria national football team
1	Ghana	2	1	1	0	6	3	+3	3	Advanced to the CAF second round	—	4–1
2	Nigeria	2	0	1	1	3	6	−3	1		2–2	—

Source: RSSSF
28 August 1960

Ghana	4–1	Nigeria
Acquah 18'; Boateng 44'; Fynn 54'; Salisu 55'	Report	Fayemi 50'

Accra Sports Stadium, Accra, Ghana
Attendance: 40,000
Referee: Holland (England)

10 September 1960

Nigeria	2–2	Ghana
Emenako 28'; Fayemi 75' (pen.)	Report	Acquah 14', 83'

George V Stadium, Lagos, Nigeria
Attendance: 12,179
Referee: Tschenscher (West Germany)

=== Second round ===
Pos	Team	Pld	W	D	L	GF	GA	GD	Pts	Qualification	Morocco national football team	Ghana national football team
1	Morocco	2	1	1	0	1	0	+1	3	Advanced to the CAF–UEFA play-off	—	1–0
2	Ghana	2	0	1	1	0	1	−1	1		0–0	—

Source: RSSSF
2 April 1961

Ghana	0–0	Morocco
	Report

Accra Sports Stadium, Accra, Ghana
Attendance: 40,000
Referee: Hussein Fahmy (Egypt)

28 May 1961

Morocco	1–0	Ghana
Khalfi 37'	Report

Stade d'Honneur, Casablanca, Morocco
Attendance: 12,000
Referee: Blanco Perez (Spain)

== Goalscorers ==
There were 18 goals scored in 7 matches, for an average of 2.57 goals per match.

3 goals

- (Ghana) Edward Acquah

2 goals

- (Morocco) Abdallah Azhar
- (Morocco) Mohamed Khalfi
- (Nigeria) Dejo Fayemi

1 goal

- (Ghana) Edward Boateng
- (Ghana) Edward Aggrey-Fynn
- (Ghana) Mohamadu Salisu
- (Morocco) Lahcen Chicha
- (Nigeria) Godwin Emenako
- (Tunisia) Abdelmajid Chetali
- (Tunisia) Brahim Kerrit
- (Tunisia) Rached Meddeb
- (Tunisia) Abdelmajid Tlemçani

== Inter-confederation play-offs ==
Pos	Team	Pld	W	D	L	GF	GA	GD	Pts	Qualification	(Spain)	(Morocco)
1	Spain	2	2	0	0	4	2	+2	4	1962 FIFA World Cup	—	3–2
2	Morocco	2	0	0	2	2	4	−2	0		0–1	—

Source: RSSSF
