= 1960 Mitropa Cup =

Tournament details
- Dates: July 1960
- Teams: 30

Final positions
- Champions: Hungary

Tournament statistics
- Matches played: 30
- Goals scored: 104 (3.47 per match)

The 1960 Mitropa Cup was the 20th season of the Mitropa football club tournament. It was contested as a competition between countries and there was no elimination. The five competing countries each sent six teams each to the competition, which was won by Hungary.

== Matches ==
=== Summary ===
Matches played in July 1960.

Team 1	Agg.	Team 2	1st leg	2nd leg
Wiener SK (Austria)	3–3	(Czechoslovakia) Dukla Prague	2–1	1–2
Linzer ASK (Austria)	2–6	(Czechoslovakia) Spartak Stalingrad	1–3	1–3
First Vienna FC (Austria)	3–6	(Hungary) Vasas SC	2–3	1–3
Ferencváros (Hungary)	6–3	(Austria) 1. Simmeringer SC	1–2	5–1
Udinese (Italy)	4–4	FK Austria	2–0	2–4
Vojvodina Novi Sad (Socialist Federal Republic of Yugoslavia)	7–2	(Austria) Wiener AC	2–2	5–0
Tatabányai Bányász (Hungary)	5–4	(Czechoslovakia) Ruda Hvezda Bratislava	2–1	3–3
Spartak Trnava (Czechoslovakia)	2–1	(Italy) Roma	2–0	0–1
Baník Ostrava (Czechoslovakia)	4–4	(Socialist Federal Republic of Yugoslavia) OFK Beograd	2–1	2–3
Partizan Belgrade (Socialist Federal Republic of Yugoslavia)	3–5	(Czechoslovakia) Slovan Bratislava	2–1	1–4
Palermo (Italy)	3–2	(Hungary) Diósgyőri VTK	1–2	2–0
Újpesti Dózsa (Hungary)	2–1	(Italy) Fiorentina	0–1	2–0
FK Sarajevo (Socialist Federal Republic of Yugoslavia)	2–4	(Hungary) MTK Budapest	1–2	1–2
Velez Mostar (Socialist Federal Republic of Yugoslavia)	6–2	(Italy) Alessandria	4–1	2–1
Hajduk Split (Socialist Federal Republic of Yugoslavia)	4–1	(Italy) Bologna	3–1	1–0

=== Matches ===
3 July 1960

Wiener SK (Austria)	2 – 1	(Czechoslovakia) Dukla Prague
Hamerl 25'; Knoll 90'	Report	Sůra 36'

Vienna
Attendance: 25,000
10 July 1960

Dukla Prague (Czechoslovakia)	2 – 1	(Austria) Wiener SK
Kučera 25'; Sůra 65'	Report	Hof 80'

Stadion Juliska, Prague
Attendance: 10,000
Referee: Andor Dorogi (Hungary)

3 July 1960

LASK (Austria)	1 – 3	(Czechoslovakia) Spartak Stalingrad
Spielmann	Report	Kopsa 18', 45', 79'

10 July 1960

Spartak Stalingrad (Czechoslovakia)	3 – 1	(Austria) LASK
Král 26'; Hubálek 75'; Kaura 79'	Report	Kozlicek 87'

Referee: István Zsolt (Hungary)

3 July 1960

Tatabányai Bányász (Hungary)	2 – 1	(Czechoslovakia) Ruda Hvezda Bratislava
Bíró 34'; Rapai 81'	Report	Scherer 58'

10 July 1960

Ruda Hvezda Bratislava (Czechoslovakia)	3 – 3	(Hungary) Tatabányai Bányász
Kačáni; Gajdoš; Šón	Report	Török; Lachos pen.' Sawiak

Referee: Leo Lemešić (Yugoslavia)

3 July 1960

Spartak Trnava (Czechoslovakia)	2 – 0	(Italy) Roma
Adamec; Švec	Report

10 July 1960

Roma (Italy)	1 – 0	(Czechoslovakia) Spartak Trnava
Goal	Report

3 July 1960

Baník Ostrava (Czechoslovakia)	2 – 1	(Socialist Federal Republic of Yugoslavia) Beograd
Valošek; Gojkov 89' (o.g.)	Report	Mladenović

Attendance: 15,000
10 July 1960

Beograd (Socialist Federal Republic of Yugoslavia)	3 – 2	(Czechoslovakia) Baník Ostrava
Skoblar 4'; Borozan 47'; Antić 80'	Report	Šindelář 32'; Pospichal 89'

Attendance: 3,000
Referee: Francesco Liverani (Italy)

3 July 1960

Partizan Belgrade (Socialist Federal Republic of Yugoslavia)	2 – 1	(Czechoslovakia) Slovan Bratislava
Vukelić; Vasović	Report	Pajević (o.g.)

10 July 1960

Slovan Bratislava (Czechoslovakia)	4 – 1	(Socialist Federal Republic of Yugoslavia) Partizan Belgrade
Bílý; Cvetler; Mráz	Report	Kovačević

Referee: Vilmos Hernádi (Hungary)

== Final standings ==
#	Country	P	W	D	L	GF	GA	Pts
1	Hungary	12	8	1	3	25	16	17
2	(Socialist Federal Republic of Yugoslavia) Yugoslavia	12	7	1	4	26	18	15
3	Czechoslovakia	12	6	1	5	24	18	13
4	Italy	12	4	0	8	12	20	8
5	Austria	12	3	1	8	17	32	7
