= Fayemi =

Nigerian given name

- Gender: Male
- Language: Yoruba

Origin
- Origin: Nigeria
- Meaning: Ifá suits me.
- Region of origin: South West, Nigeria

Fayemi audio is a Nigerian male given name and surname of Yoruba origin. It means "Ifá suits me" that is Oracle suit me. Sometimes spell as "Ifayemi"

Notable individuals with the name include:

- Bisi Adeleye-Fayemi (born 1963), Nigerian-British feminist activist
- Dejo Fayemi (1933–2016), Nigerian footballer
- Kayode Fayemi (born 1965), Nigerian politician
- Olawumi Fayemi-Obayelu (born 1986), Nigerian politician
