= 1962 FIFA World Cup qualification (CCCF/NAFC–CONMEBOL play-off) =

- Event: 1962 FIFA World Cup qualification
| Mexico | Paraguay |
| (Mexico) | (Paraguay) |
- Mexico won 3–1 on points and qualified for the 1962 FIFA World Cup

First leg
| Mexico | Paraguay |
| 1 | 0 |
- Date: 29 October 1961
- Venue: Estadio Olímpico Universitario, Mexico City
- Referee: Walter van Rosberg (Netherlands Antilles)
- Attendance: 80,000

Second leg
| Paraguay | Mexico |
| 0 | 0 |
- Date: 5 November 1961
- Venue: Estadio de Puerto Sajonia, Asunción
- Referee: Pablo Victor Vaga Albergatti (Uruguay)
- Attendance: 15,000

The 1962 FIFA World Cup CCCF/NAFC–CONMEBOL qualification play-off was a two-legged home-and-away tie between the winners of the CCCF/NAFC final round, Mexico, and a randomly drawn team from the CONMEBOL region, Paraguay. The matches were played on 29 October and 5 November 1961 in Mexico City and Asunción, respectively.

In the first match, Mexico beat Paraguay 1–0 while in the second leg, both teams drew 0–0. Mexico won the series, qualifying for the World Cup.

== Teams ==
| Team | Confederation | Qualification |
|---|---|---|
| Mexico | NAFC | CCCF/NAFC second round winners |
| Paraguay | CONMEBOL | Directly sent to the series |

== Venues ==
Venues for the series

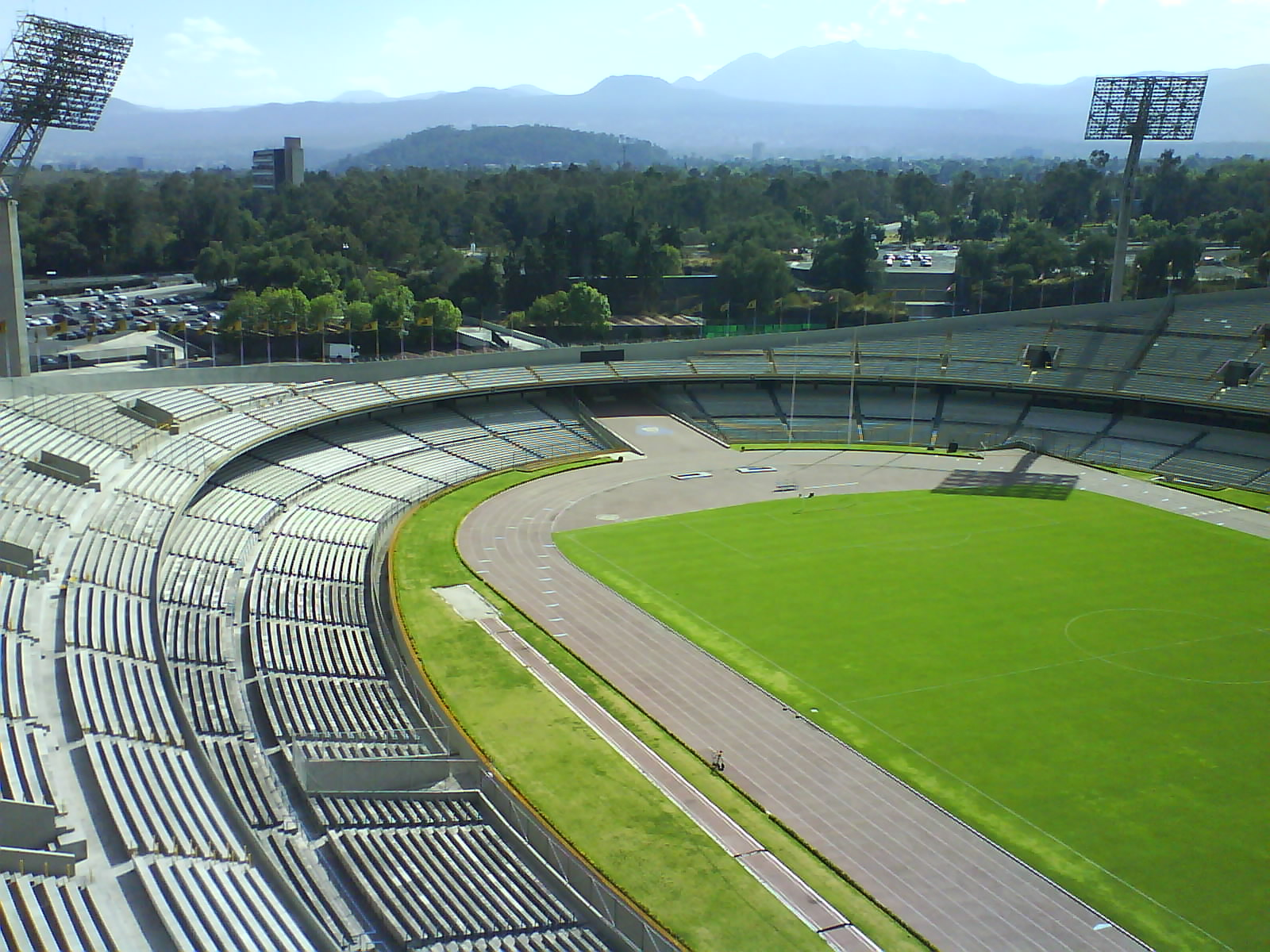
Estadio Olímpico Universitario

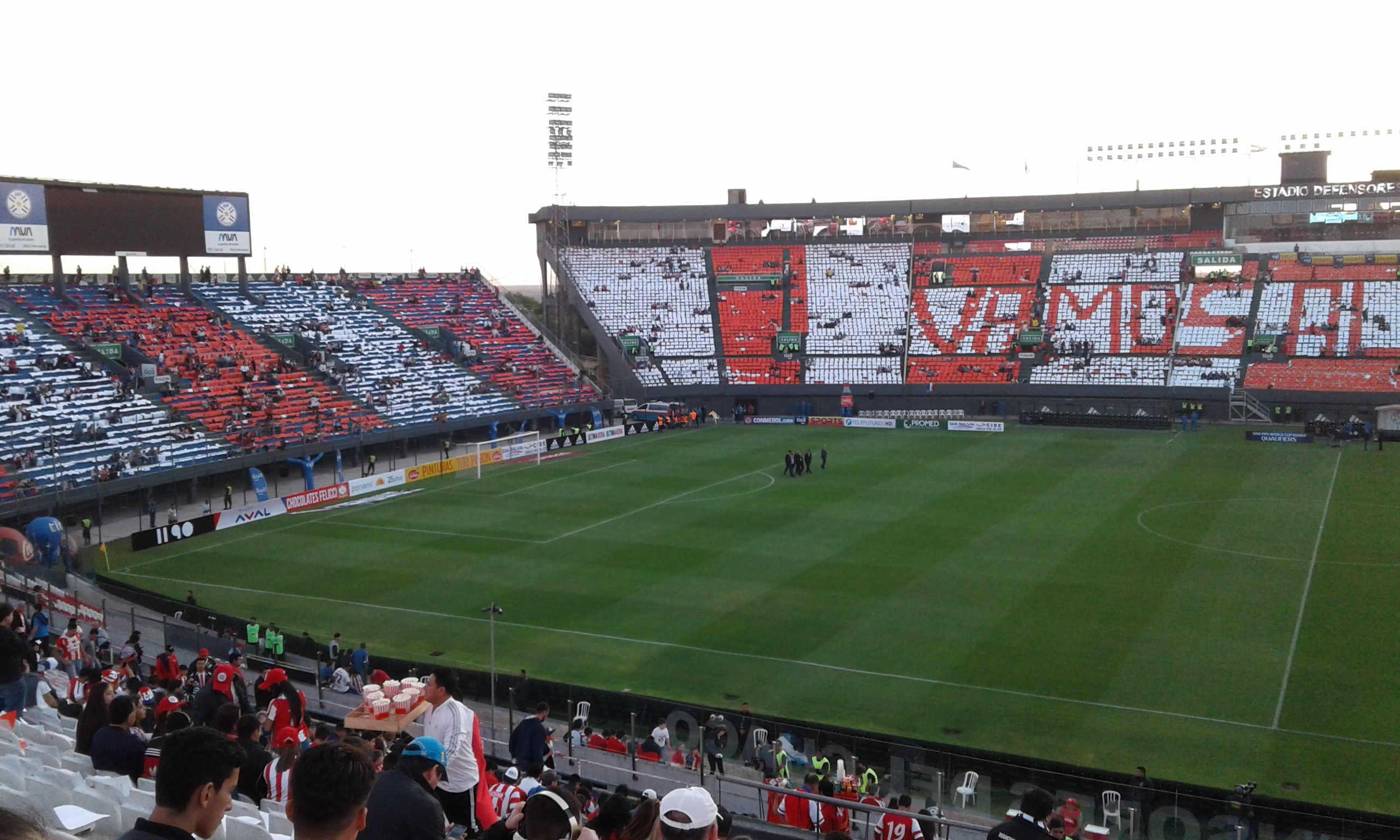
Estadio de Puerto Sajonia

== Standings ==
| Pos | Team | Pld | W | D | L | GF | GA | GD | Pts | Qualification | (Mexico) | (Paraguay) |
|---|---|---|---|---|---|---|---|---|---|---|---|---|
| 1 | Mexico | 2 | 1 | 1 | 0 | 1 | 0 | +1 | 3 | 1962 FIFA World Cup | — | 1–0 |
| 2 | Paraguay | 2 | 0 | 1 | 1 | 0 | 1 | −1 | 1 | | 0–0 | — |

Source: RSSSF

== Matches ==
=== First leg ===
29 October 1961

| Mexico | 1–0 | Paraguay |
|---|---|---|
| Reyes 20' |

Estadio Olímpico Universitario, Mexico City
Attendance: 80,000
Referee: Walter van Rosberg (Netherlands Antilles)

Mexico
Paraguay

| GK | Antonio Carbajal |
| DF | Arturo Chaires |
| DF | Guillermo Sepúlveda |
| DF | José Villegas |
| MF | Salvador Farfán |
| MF | Pedro Nájera |
| FW | Alfredo del Águila |
| FW | Salvador Reyes Monteón |
| FW | Carlos Lara |
| FW | Guillermo Ortiz |
| FW | Agustín Peniche |
Manager:
(Mexico) Ignacio Trelles

| GK | Ramón Mayeregger |
| DF | Idalino Monges |
| DF | Carlos Monín |
| DF | Luis Gini |
| MF | Fernando López |
| MF | Gerardo Núñez |
| FW | Salvador Breglia |
| FW | Juan P. Leiva |
| FW | Juan G. González |
| FW | Eliseo Insfrán |
| FW | Claudio Lezcano |
Manager:
(Paraguay) Aurelio González

=== Second leg ===
5 November 1961

| Paraguay | 0–0 | Mexico |

Estadio de Puerto Sajonia, Asunción
Attendance: 15,000
Referee: Pablo Victor Vaga Albergatti (Uruguay)
