= Szigeti (surname) =

Joseph Szigeti (1892–1973) was a Hungarian violinist.

Szigeti may also refer to:

- Cynthia Szigeti (1949–2016), American comic actress
- Florencia Szigeti (born 1981), freestyle swimmer
- György Szigeti (1905–1978), Hungarian inventor and physicist
- Lajos Szigeti (1906–1974), boxer
- Oszkár Szigeti (1933–1983), football defender
- Ottó Szigeti (1911–1976), tennis player
- Zoltán Szigeti (1932–2009), sprint canoer

== See also ==
- Szigeti (grape) or Furmint, a Hungarian wine grape
