= Luís Santos =

Luis Santos may refer to:

- Luis Martín-Santos (1924–1964), Spanish psychiatrist and author
- Luís Capoulas Santos (born 1951), Portuguese politician
- Luís Santos (chess player) (born 1955), Portuguese chess player
- Luis Mariano Santos (born 1969), Spanish politician
- Luís Santos (fighter) (born 1980), Brazilian mixed martial artist
- Luís Santos (water polo) (born 1980), Brazilian water polo player
- Luis Miguel Santos (born 1969), Portuguese Olympic Soling sailor
- Luis Santos (baseball) (born 1991), Dominican baseball player
- Luís Santos (footballer) (born 2000), Portuguese footballer
- Luis Santos Silva, Paraguayan footballer
