= 1962 FIFA World Cup qualification (UEFA–AFC play-off) =

- Event: 1962 FIFA World Cup qualification
Yugoslavia	South Korea
(Socialist Federal Republic of Yugoslavia)	(South Korea)
- Yugoslavia won 4–0 on points and qualified for the 1962 FIFA World Cup

First leg
Yugoslavia	South Korea
5	1
- Date: 8 October 1961
- Venue: JNA Stadium, Belgrade
- Referee: Konstantinos Ioannidis (Greece)
- Attendance: 20,000

Second leg
South Korea	Yugoslavia
1	3
- Date: 26 November 1961
- Venue: Hyochang Stadium, Seoul
- Referee: Mak Xeun Fei (Hong Kong)
- Attendance: 25,000

The 1962 FIFA World Cup UEFA–AFC qualification play-off was a two-legged home-and-away tie between the winners of UEFA Group 10, Yugoslavia, and the winners of the AFC final round, South Korea. The matches were played on 8 October and 26 November 1961 in Belgrade and Seoul, respectively.

After beating South Korea in both matches (5–1 in Belgrade and 3–1 in Seoul), Yugoslavia won the tie and qualified for the World Cup.

== Teams ==
Team	Confederation	Qualification
Yugoslavia	UEFA	UEFA Group 10 winners
South Korea	AFC	AFC round-robin winners

== Venues ==
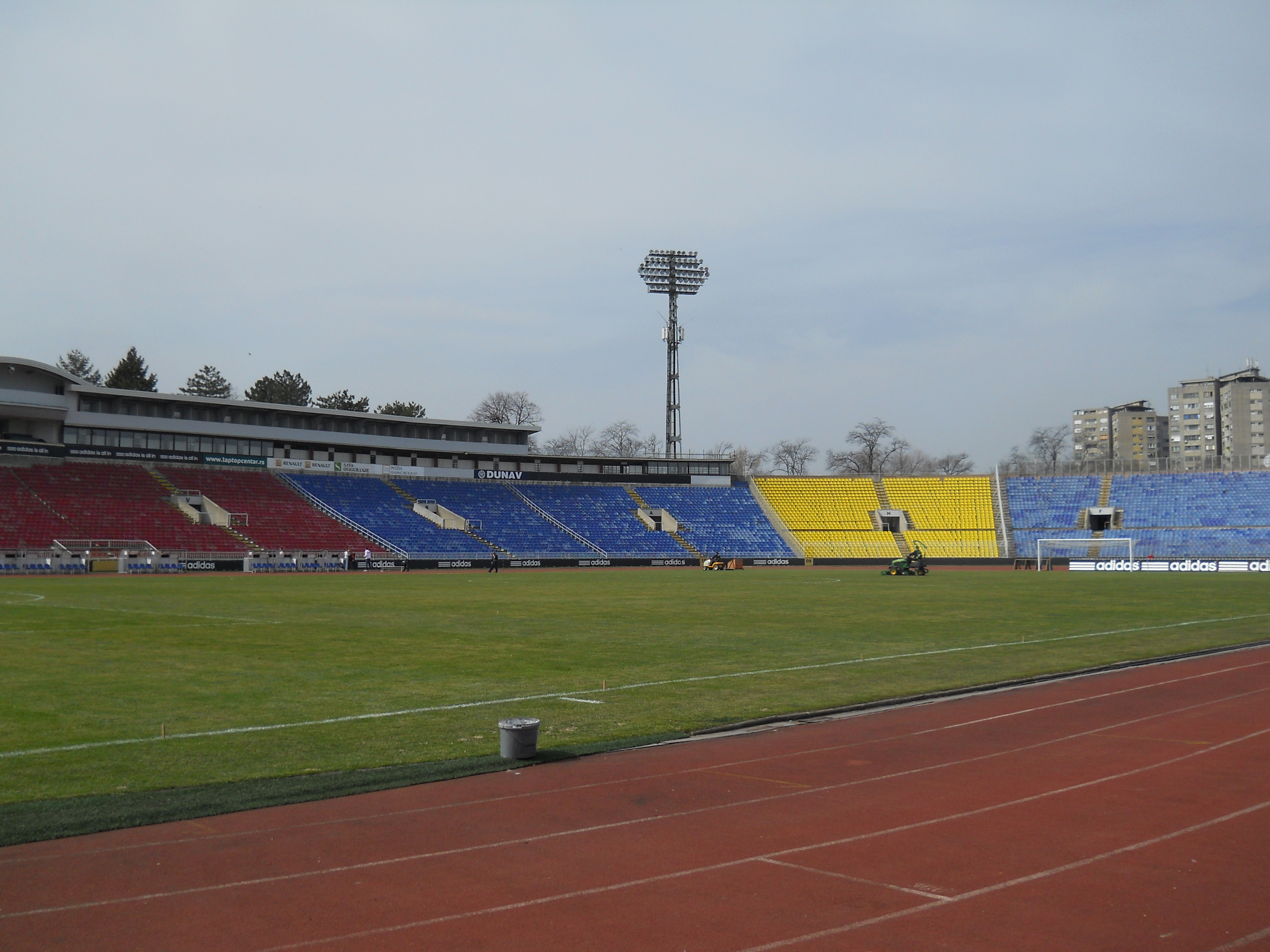
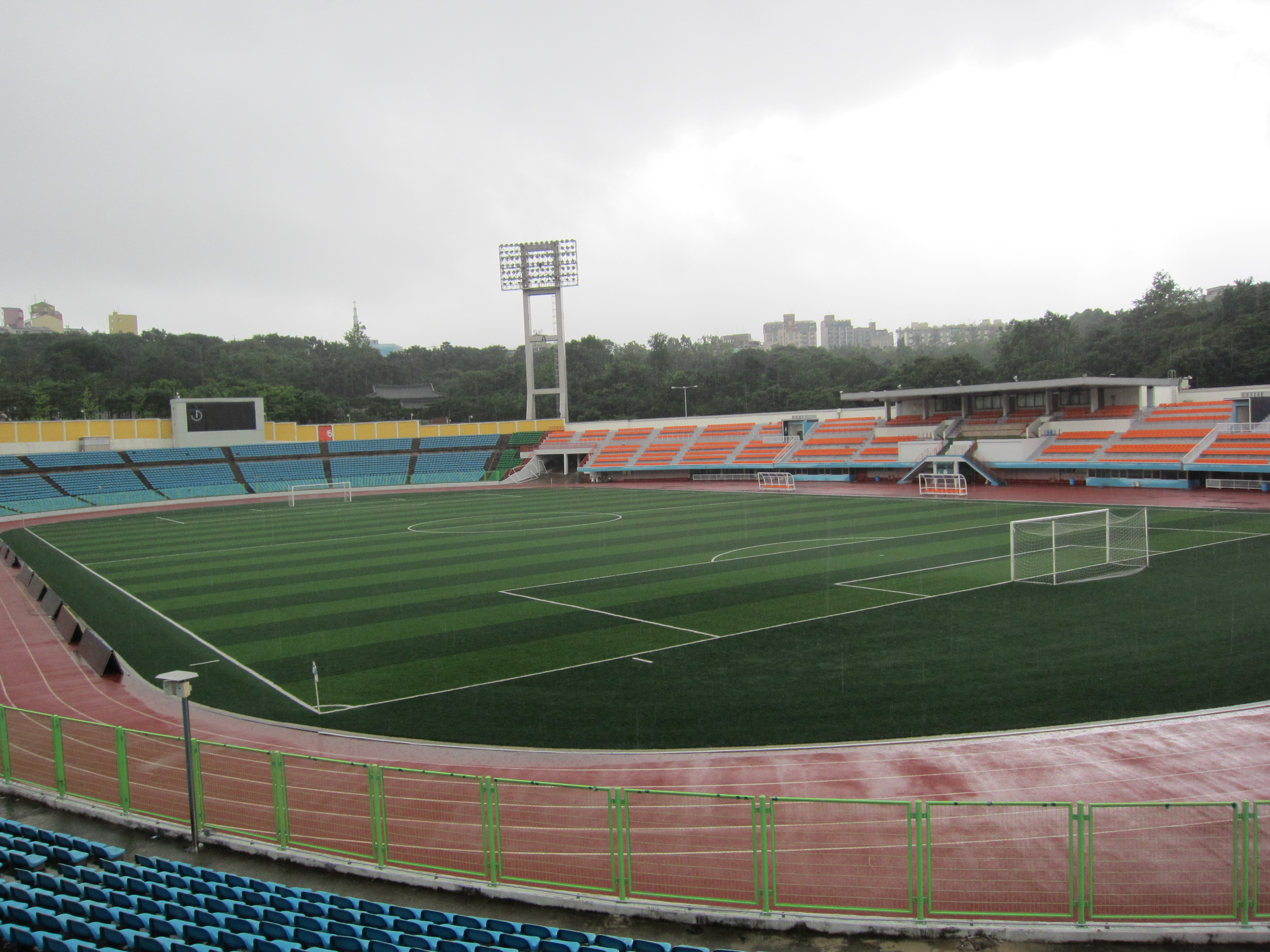
JNA Stadium in Belgrade (left) and Hyochang Stadium in Seoul were the venues for the series

== Standings ==
Pos	Team	Pld	W	D	L	GF	GA	GD	Pts	Qualification	(Socialist Federal Republic of Yugoslavia)	(South Korea)
1	Yugoslavia	2	2	0	0	8	2	+6	4	1962 FIFA World Cup	—	5–1
2	South Korea	2	0	0	2	2	8	−6	0		1–3	—

Source: RSSSF

== Matches ==
=== First leg ===
8 October 1961

Yugoslavia	5–1	South Korea
Čebinac 42'; Šekularac 54', 70'; Radaković 67'; Galić 89'		Chung Sun-cheon 82'

JNA Stadium, Belgrade
Attendance: 20,000
Referee: Konstantinos Ioannidis (Greece)

Yugoslavia
South Korea

GK	Milutin Soskic
DF	Vladimir Durkovic
DF	Velibor Vasović
DF	Zarko Nikolic
DF	Fahrudin Jusufi
MF	Petar Radakovic
MF	Dragoslav Sekularac
MF	Muhamed Mujic
FW	Milan Galić
FW	Asim Ferhatovic
FW	Srdjan Cebinac
Manager:
Ljubomir Lovrić; Prvoslav Mihajlović; Hugo Ruševljanin

GK	Ham Heung-Chul
DF	Kim Chung Suk
DF	Kim Hong-Bok
DF	Kim Sun Ki
DF	Yoo Kwang-Jun
MF	Woo Sang-Kwon
MF	Moon Jung-Sik
MF	Chung Soon-Cheon
FW	Cho Yoon-Ok
FW	Cha Tae-Sung
FW	Choi Chung-Min
Manager:
Kim Kyu-hwan

=== Second leg ===
26 November 1961

South Korea	1–3	Yugoslavia
Yoo Pan-sun 61'		Galić 17', 27'; Jerković 89'

Hyochang Stadium, Seoul
Attendance: 25,000
Referee: Mak Xeun Fei (Hong Kong)
