= Thomas Hamill =

Thomas Hamill may refer to:

- Tomás Hamill, Irish hurler
- Thomas Hamill (bowls)
- Tommy Hamill, Northern Irish footballer
