= 1962 FIFA World Cup qualification (CCCF and NAFC) =

Tournament details
- Dates: 21 August 1960 – 21 May 1961
- Teams: 7

Tournament statistics
- Matches played: 16
- Goals scored: 57 (3.56 per match)
- Top scorer: (Costa Rica) Juan Ulloa (6 goals)

The North, Central American and Caribbean section of the 1962 FIFA World Cup qualification acted as qualifiers for the 1962 FIFA World Cup in Chile, for national teams which are members of the CCCF and NAFC. Seven teams participated in the tournament to compete for one place in the inter-confederation play-offs against a CONMEBOL team.

== Format ==
The qualification structure was as follows:

- First round: Seven teams were divided into three groups (one group of three teams and two groups of two teams) to play home-and-away round-robin matches. The winner of each group advanced to the second round.
- Second round: Three teams which had advanced from the first round played home-and-away round-robin matches in one group. The group winner qualified for the CCCF/NAFC–CONMEBOL play-off.

== Entrants ==
Eight national teams from the region initially entered qualification, though Canada later withdrew.

Note: Bolded teams advanced to the inter-confederation play-offs.

Zone	Entrants	Withdrew
North American Football Confederation (NAFC)	**Mexico**; United States	Canada
Confederación Centroamericana y del Caribe de Fútbol (CCCF)	Costa Rica; Guatemala; Honduras; Netherlands Antilles; Suriname	

== First round ==
=== Group 1 ===
Pos	Team	Pld	W	D	L	GF	GA	GD	Pts	Qualification	Mexico national football team	United States men's national soccer team
1	Mexico	2	1	1	0	6	3	+3	**3**	Advance to second round	—	3–0
2	United States	2	0	1	1	3	6	−3	**1**		3–3	—

Source: FIFA
3 November 1960

United States	3–3	Mexico
Bicek 31' (pen.); Fister 58'; Zerhusen 84'	Report	Mercado 8'; Reyes 17', 21'

Los Angeles, United States
Attendance: 8,000
Referee: Kulai (Canada)

6 November 1960

Mexico	3–0	United States
Mercado 5'; Reyes 35'; Díaz 38'	Report

Mexico City, Mexico
Attendance: 80,000
Referee: Sanchez (Honduras)

=== Group 2 ===
Pos	Team	Pld	W	D	L	GF	GA	GD	Pts	Qualification	Costa Rica national football team	Honduras national football team	Guatemala national football team
1	Costa Rica	4	2	1	1	13	8	+5	**5 (Note: As Costa Rica and Honduras finished level on points, a play-off on neutral ground was played to decide the group winners. Costa Rica won the match 1–0 to win the group.)**	Advance to second round	—	5–0	3–2
2	Honduras	4	2	1	1	5	7	−2	**5**		2–1	—	1–1
3	Guatemala	4	0	2	2	7	10	−3	**2**		4–4	0–2	—

Source: FIFA
Notes:
21 August 1960

Costa Rica	3–2	Guatemala
Rojas 28'; Ulloa 52', 58'	Report	Espinoza 1'; Masella 35'

San Jose, Costa Rica
Referee: Sundheim (Colombia)

28 August 1960

Guatemala	4–4	Costa Rica
López 13', 49', 79'; Espinoza 63'	Report	Jiménez 18', 57'; Ulloa 35', 81'

Guatemala City, Guatemala
Referee: Sundheim (Colombia)

4 September 1960

Honduras	2–1	Costa Rica
Suazo 10'; Leaky 21'	Report	Rodríguez 46'

Tegucigalpa, Honduras
Attendance: 10,730
Referee: Sundheim (Colombia)

11 September 1960

Costa Rica	5–0	Honduras
Jiménez 31', 34'; Ulloa 42'; Rodríguez 69'; Pearson 85'	Report

San Jose, Costa Rica
Attendance: 40,000
Referee: Sundheim (Colombia)

25 September 1960

Honduras	1–1	Guatemala
Suazo 59'	Report	López 28'

Tegucigalpa, Honduras
Attendance: 8,087
Referee: Mendez (El Salvador)

2 October 1960

Guatemala	0–2 Awarded (Note: FIFA awarded Honduras a 2–0 walkover win as Guatemala forfeited the match.)	Honduras
	Report

Guatemala City, Guatemala

==== Play-off ====
Costa Rica and Honduras finished level on points, and a play-off on neutral ground was played to decide who would advance to the second round.

14 January 1961

Costa Rica	1–0	Honduras
Rodríguez 29'	Report

Guatemala City, Guatemala
Attendance: 23,340
Referee: Buergo Elcuaz (Mexico)

=== Group 3 ===
Pos	Team	Pld	W	D	L	GF	GA	GD	Pts	Qualification	Netherlands Antilles national football team	Suriname national football team
1	Netherlands Antilles	2	1	1	0	2	1	+1	**3**	Advance to second round	—	0–0
2	Suriname	2	0	1	1	1	2	−1	**1**		1–2	—

Source: FIFA
2 October 1960

Suriname	1–2	Netherlands Antilles
Foe a Man 45'	Report	Dirksz 21', 45'

Paramaribo, Suriname
Referee: Orrego (Colombia)

27 November 1960

Netherlands Antilles	0–0	Suriname
	Report

Willemstad, Netherlands Antilles
Referee: Yamasaki (Peru)

== Second round ==
Pos	Team	Pld	W	D	L	GF	GA	GD	Pts	Qualification	Mexico national football team	Costa Rica national football team	Netherlands Antilles national football team
1	Mexico	4	2	1	1	11	2	+9	**5**	Advance to CCCF/NAFC–CONMEBOL play-off	—	4–1	7–0
2	Costa Rica	4	2	0	2	8	6	+2	**4**		1–0	—	6–0
3	Netherlands Antilles	4	1	1	2	2	13	−11	**3**		0–0	2–0	—

Source: FIFA
22 March 1961

Costa Rica	1–0	Mexico
Goban 51'	Report

San Jose, Costa Rica
Referee: Queiroz (Brazil)

29 March 1961

Costa Rica	6–0	Netherlands Antilles
Ulloa 12'; Quesada 28', 89'; Rojas 33'; Rodríguez 42'; Monge 50'	Report

San Jose, Costa Rica
Referee: Tejada Burga (Peru)

5 April 1961

Mexico	7–0	Netherlands Antilles
Flores 28', 52', 64'; Reyes 45', 75'; González 65', 80'	Report

Mexico City, Mexico
Referee: Morgan (Canada)

12 April 1961

Mexico	4–1	Costa Rica
Flores 11'; Cárdenas 31'; Gutiérrez 77'; Mercado 87'	Report	Grant 54'

Mexico City, Mexico
Referee: Sundheim (Colombia)

23 April 1961

Netherlands Antilles	2–0	Costa Rica
Loran 30', 34'	Report

Willemstad, Netherlands Antilles
Referee: Trapote López (Venezuela)

21 May 1961

Netherlands Antilles	0–0	Mexico
	Report

Willemstad, Netherlands Antilles
Referee: Goldstein (United States)

== Inter-confederation play-offs ==
Pos	Team	Pld	W	D	L	GF	GA	GD	Pts	Qualification	(Mexico)	(Paraguay)
1	Mexico	2	1	1	0	1	0	+1	**3**	1962 FIFA World Cup	—	1–0
2	Paraguay	2	0	1	1	0	1	−1	**1**		0–0	—

Source: RSSSF

== Qualified teams ==
The following team from CONCACAF qualified for the final tournament.

Team	Qualified as	Qualified on	Previous appearances in FIFA World Cup
Mexico	CCCF/NAFC–CONMEBOL play-off winners	5 November 1961	4 (1930, 1950, 1954, 1958)

== Goalscorers ==
There were 57 goals scored in 16 matches, for an average of 3.56 goals per match. The inter-confederation play-offs are not included in this count.

6 goals

- (Costa Rica) Juan Ulloa

5 goals

- (Mexico) Salvador Reyes Monteón

4 goals

- (Costa Rica) Rubén Jiménez
- (Costa Rica) Marvin Rodríguez
- (Guatemala) Pinula Contreras
- (Mexico) Francisco Flores

3 goals

- (Mexico) Sigfrido Mercado

2 goals

- (Costa Rica) Manrique Quesada
- (Guatemala) Augusto Espinoza
- (Honduras) Carlos Humberto Suazo
- (Mexico) Eduardo González Palmer
- (Netherlands Antilles) Eduvigis Rudolfo Dirksz
- (Netherlands Antilles) Edwin Miliano Loran

1 goal

- (Costa Rica) Carlos Vivo Goban
- (Costa Rica) Álvaro Grant
- (Costa Rica) Jorge Monge
- (Costa Rica) Walter Pearson
- (Costa Rica) Francisco Rojas
- (Costa Rica) Rigoberto Rojas
- (Guatemala) Fred Masella
- (Honduras) Ronald Leaky
- (Mexico) Raúl Cárdenas
- (Mexico) Isidoro Díaz
- (Mexico) Crescencio Gutiérrez
- (Suriname (Kingdom of the Netherlands)) August Foe a Man
- (United States) Helmut Bicek
- (United States) Carl Fister
- (United States) Al Zerhusen
