= 1962 FIFA World Cup qualification (CAF–UEFA play-off) =

- Event: 1962 FIFA World Cup qualification
Morocco	Spain
(Morocco)	(Spain)
- Spain won 4–0 on points and qualified for the 1962 FIFA World Cup

First leg
Morocco	Spain
0	1
- Date: 12 November 1961
- Venue: Stade d'honneur, Casablanca
- Referee: Daniel Mellet (Switzerland)
- Attendance: 26,000

Second leg
Spain	Morocco
3	2
- Date: 23 November 1961
- Venue: Santiago Bernabéu, Madrid
- Referee: Cesare Jonni (Italy)
- Attendance: 30,000

The 1962 FIFA World Cup CAF–UEFA qualification play-off was a two-legged home-and-away tie between the winners of the CAF final round, Morocco, and the winners of the UEFA Group 9 second round, Spain. The matches were played on 12 and 23 November 1961 in Casablanca and Madrid, respectively.

Spain won the series after beating Morocco in both matches (1–0 in Casablanca and 3–2 in Madrid), and therefore qualified for the World Cup.

== Venues ==
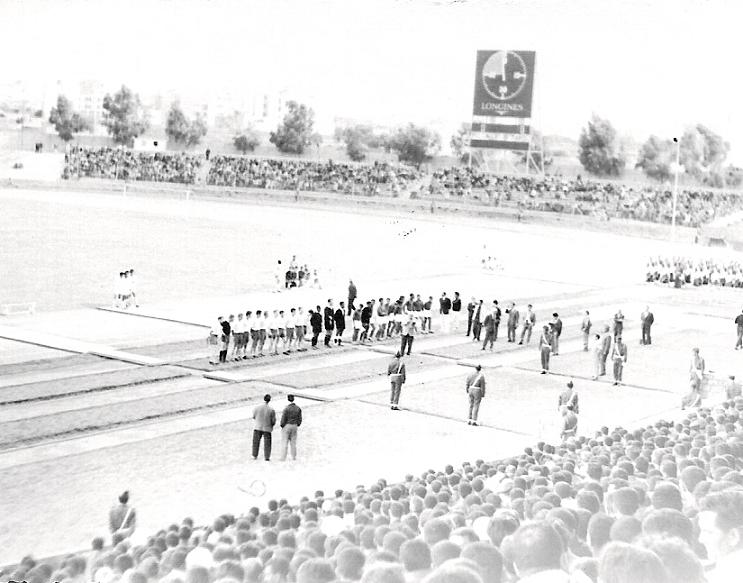
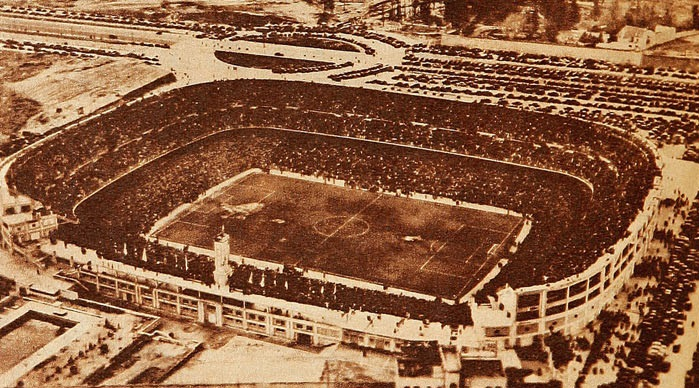
Stade d'honneur (left) and Santiago Bernabéu Stadium, venues for the series

== Standings ==
Pos	Team	Pld	W	D	L	GF	GA	GD	Pts	Qualification	(Spain)	(Morocco)
1	Spain	2	2	0	0	4	2	+2	4	1962 FIFA World Cup	—	3–2
2	Morocco	2	0	0	2	2	4	−2	0		0–1	—

Source: RSSSF

== Matches ==
=== First leg ===
12 November 1961

Morocco	0–1	Spain
		Del Sol 80'

Stade d'honneur, Casablanca
Attendance: 26,000
Referee: Daniel Mellet (Switzerland)

=== Second leg ===
23 November 1961

Spain	3–2	Morocco
Marcelino 12'; Di Stéfano 44'; Collar 58'		Riahi 40'; Ben Barek 64'

Santiago Bernabéu, Madrid
Attendance: 30,000
Referee: Cesare Jonni (Italy)

Morocco

GK	José Araquistáin
DF	Feliciano Rivilla
DF	José Santamaría
DF	Isacio Calleja
DF	Luis del Sol
MF	Manuel Ruiz Sosa
MF	Koldo Aguirre
MF	Ignacio Zoco
FW	Alfredo Di Stéfano
FW	Marcelino Martínez
FW	Enrique Collar (c)
Manager:
Pedro Escartín

GK	Ahmed Laghrissi
DF	Ben Belaid Larbi
DF	Mustapha Bettache
DF	Mohamed Bouchaib
MF	Mohamed Tibari
MF	Abderrahmane Mahjoub
MF	Abdallah Ben Barek
MF	Sellam Riahi
MF	Mohamed Khalfi
MF	Brahim Zehhar
FW	Abdallah Azhar
Manager:
Mohammed Massoun
