= George Baker (footballer) =

Welsh footballer (1936–2024)

Personal information
- Full name: Thomas George Baker
- Date of birth: 6 April 1936
- Place of birth: Maerdy, Wales
- Date of death: 23 April 2024 (aged 88)
- Positions: Winger; centre forward

Senior career*
Years	Team	Apps	(Gls)
1954–1961	Plymouth Argyle	78	(16)
1960–1962	Shrewsbury Town	52	(5)
1962–19??	Barry Town	?	(?)
Total		130	(21)

International career
1958–1959	Wales U23	2	(0)
1958	Wales	0	(0)
- * Club domestic league appearances and goals

Thomas George Baker (6 April 1936 – 23 April 2024) was a Welsh international footballer who was in Wales squad for the 1958 FIFA World Cup.

== Club career ==
Originally a winger, Baker joined Plymouth Argyle as a teenager in the early 1950s. He made his first team debut in October 1954, but appeared sporadically over the next three years, as he developed his game playing for the club's reserve team in the Plymouth & District, Devon Wednesday, and Football Combination Leagues. He became a first team regular in 1958, and played an important part in the club's Third Division title campaign a year later. After that success, Baker sustained a knee injury which eventually brought his career at Home Park to an end. He scored 17 goals in all competitions for the club and made 83 appearances. He joined Shrewsbury Town in 1961, who were under the management of Arthur Rowley. He played in the match where Rowley broke Dixie Dean's record for most goals scored in the Football League. After 5 goals in 52 appearances, Baker returned to South Wales in 1962 to play for Barry Town, where he finished his career playing in the Southern League.

== International career ==
Baker was a member of the Wales squad which participated in the 1958 FIFA World Cup in Sweden. Wales progressed to the quarter-finals of the competition, where they were knocked out by Brazil, but Baker was an unused substitute in all five matches. He, Graham Vearncombe, John Elsworthy and Len Allchurch were in the 22-man squad but never went to the tournament, as they were not booked onto the aeroplane. He played twice for his country at under-23 level, against England in 1958, and Scotland in 1959.

== Personal life and death ==
After retiring from football, Baker was an executive for an opencast mining company in south Wales. He settled in Tylorstown by 2008. Baker died on 23 April 2024, at the age of 88.

== Honours ==
Plymouth Argyle

- Third Division: 1958–59
