= 1962 FIFA World Cup qualification (AFC) =

1962 FIFA World Cup qualifiers in Asia

Tournament details
- Dates: 6 November 1960 – 11 June 1961
- Teams: 2 (from 1 confederation)

Tournament statistics
- Matches played: 2
- Goals scored: 5 (2.5 per match)
- Attendance: 31,000 (15,500 per match)
- Top scorer: (South Korea) Chung Soon-cheon (3 goals)

The Asian section of the 1962 FIFA World Cup qualification saw three teams enter and compete for a partial spot at the final tournament.

== Format ==
The tournament consisted of one round with three teams playing against each other on a home-and-away basis. The group winner advanced to the UEFA/AFC Intercontinental play-off.

== Standings ==
| Pos | Team | Pld | W | D | L | GF | GA | GD | Pts | Qualification | South Korea national football team | Japan national football team | Indonesia national football team |
|---|---|---|---|---|---|---|---|---|---|---|---|---|---|
| 1 | South Korea | 2 | 2 | 0 | 0 | 4 | 1 | +3 | 4 | UEFA/AFC Intercontinental Play-off | — | 2–1 | — |
| 2 | Japan | 2 | 0 | 0 | 2 | 1 | 4 | −3 | 0 | | 0–2 | — | — |
| 3 | Indonesia | 0 | 0 | 0 | 0 | 0 | 0 | 0 | 0 | Withdrew | — | — | — |

Source: RSSSF

=== Matches ===
6 November 1960

| South Korea | 2–1 | Japan |
|---|---|---|
| Chung Soon-cheon 39', 41' | Report | Sasaki 26' |

Hyochang Stadium, Seoul
Attendance: 11,000
Referee: Kim Duck-Chun (South Korea)

11 June 1961

| Japan | 0–2 | South Korea |
|---|---|---|
| | Report | Chung Soon-cheon 21'; Yoo Pan-soon 26' |

National Stadium, Tokyo
Attendance: 20,000
Referee: Pratlett (Hong Kong)

== Inter-confederation play-offs ==
| Pos | Team | Pld | W | D | L | GF | GA | GD | Pts | Qualification | (Socialist Federal Republic of Yugoslavia) | (South Korea) |
|---|---|---|---|---|---|---|---|---|---|---|---|---|
| 1 | Yugoslavia | 2 | 2 | 0 | 0 | 8 | 2 | +6 | 4 | 1962 FIFA World Cup | — | 5–1 |
| 2 | South Korea | 2 | 0 | 0 | 2 | 2 | 8 | −6 | 0 | | 1–3 | — |

Source: RSSSF

== Goalscorers ==
There were 5 goals scored in 2 matches, for an average of 2.5 goals per match.

3 goals

- (South Korea) Chung Soon-cheon

1 goal

- (Japan) Koji Sasaki
- (South Korea) Yoo Pan-soon
