= Vearncombe =

Vearncombe is a surname of English origin derived from Farncombe, the name of a village, which means "fern valley". Notable people with the surname include:

- Colin Vearncombe (1962-2016), better known as Black, English singer-songwriter
- Graham Vearncombe (1934-1992), Welsh international footballer
