= Luis Gini =

Paraguayan footballer (1935–2026)

Personal information
- Full name: Luis Arnulfo Gini Jara
- Date of birth: 31 October 1935
- Place of birth: Piribebuy, Paraguay
- Date of death: 29 June 2026 (aged 90)
- Position: Defender

Senior career*
Years	Team	Apps	(Gls)
1958–?	Sol de América		
1969–1972	The Strongest		

International career
1958–1961	Paraguay	8	(0)
- * Club domestic league appearances and goals

Luis Arnulfo Gini Jara (31 October 1935 – 29 June 2026) was a Paraguayan football defender who was in Paraguay’s squad for the 1958 FIFA World Cup. He also played for Club Sol de América.

== International career ==
Gini was included in Paraguay's squad for the 1958 FIFA World Cup but did not make any appearances.

He was also in Paraguay's squad for the 1959 Copa America in Argentina, playing five games. The first game against Chile was also his first cap with Paraguay. Gini's eighth and final cap was the second leg of the 1962 FIFA World Cup qualification Inter-confederation playoff against Mexico.

== Death ==
Gini died on 29 June 2026, at the age of 90.
