= Bernard Chiarelli =

French footballer (1934–2024)

Personal information
- Date of birth: 24 February 1934
- Place of birth: Valenciennes, France
- Date of death: 17 November 2024 (aged 90)
- Position: Midfielder

Senior career*
| Years | Team | Apps | (Gls) |
| 1952–1958 | Valenciennes | 171 | (25) |
| 1958–1959 | Lens | 33 | (5) |
| 1959–1962 | Lille | 65 | (10) |
| 1962–1963 | Sedan | 43 | (6) |
| 1963–1964 | Le Havre | 26 | (4) |
| 1964–1966 | Bergerac | | |

International career
| 1958 | France | 1 | (0) |

Managerial career
- 1965–1967: AS Nontronnaise
- 1968–1977: Amicale de Lucé
- 1977–1981: Stade Raismois
Medal record
Representing France
FIFA World Cup
| Third place | 1958 Sweden |
- * Club domestic league appearances and goals

Bernard Chiarelli (24 February 1934 – 17 November 2024) was a French footballer who played as midfielder. He was a member of the France side that finished third at the 1958 FIFA World Cup and won one cap, against Switzerland in 1958. Chiarelli died on 17 November 2024, at the age of 90.

== Honours ==
France

- FIFA World Cup third place: 1958
