= Ingemar Haraldsson =

Swedish footballer

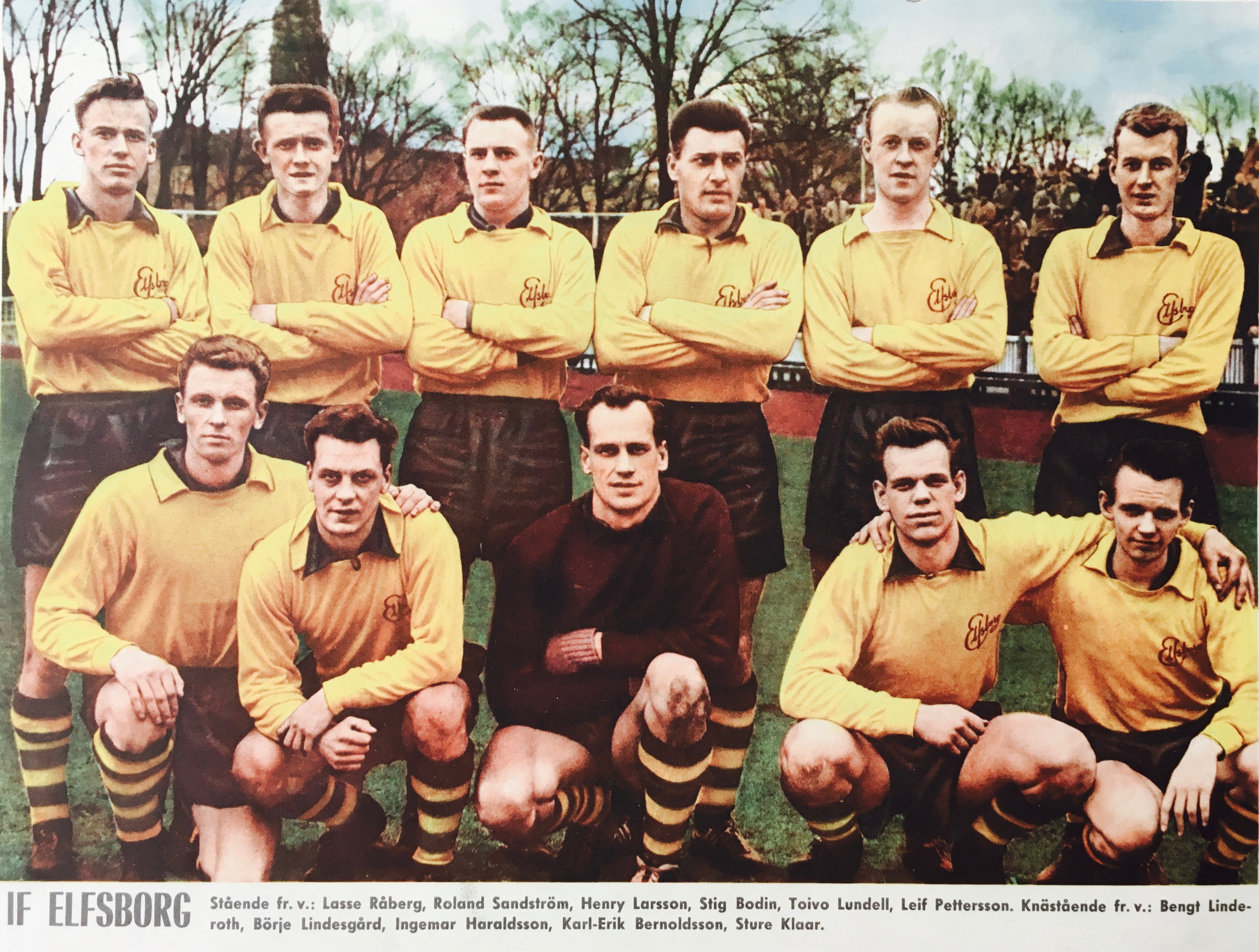
- IF Elfsborg's team in 1959 – from left, standing: Lasse Råberg, Roland Sandström, Henry Larsson, Stig Bodin, Toivo Lundell, Leif Pettersson; crouched: Bengt Linderoth, Börje Lindsgård, Ingemar Haraldsson, Karl-Erik Bernoldssson and Sture Klaar.

Personal information
- Full name: Ingemar Haraldsson
- Date of birth: 3 February 1928
- Place of birth: Sweden
- Date of death: 19 March 2004 (aged 76)
- Position: Goalkeeper

Senior career*
Years	Team	Apps	(Gls)
- Kalmar FF
- IF Elfsborg

International career
1952–1955	Sweden B	7	(0)
Medal record
Men's Football
Representing Sweden
FIFA World Cup
Runner-up	1958 Sweden
- * Club domestic league appearances and goals

Ingemar Haraldsson (3 February 1928 – 19 March 2004) was a Swedish football goalkeeper who represented Sweden at the 1958 FIFA World Cup where he served as a backup goalkeeper behind Kalle Svensson. He also played for Kalmar FF and IF Elfsborg.
