= Abdallah Ben Barek =

Moroccan footballer (born 1937)

Personal information
- Full name: Abdallah Ben Barek El Antaki
- Date of birth: 2 February 1937 (age 89)
- Place of birth: Rabat, French Protectorate of Morocco
- Position: Midfielder

Senior career*
Years	Team	Apps	(Gls)
- Stade Marocain
1957–1958	Granada	30	(3)
1958–1968	Málaga	180	(10)
Total		210+	(13+)

International career
	Morocco	8	

Managerial career
- 1970–1971: Atlético Malagueño
- 1972–1973: San Fernando
- 1973–1974: Almería
- 1974–1975: Atlético Marbella
- 1975–1976: Alavés
- 1976–1977: Tarrassa
- 1977–1978: Córdoba
- 1978–1980: Granada
- 1980–1981: Málaga
- 1982–1983: Xerez
- 1984: Antequerano
- 1991: Málaga
- 1993: Melilla
- * Club domestic league appearances and goals

Abdallah Ben Barek El Antaki (Arabic: عبد الله بن مبارك الأنطاكي; born 2 February 1937) is a Moroccan former footballer and manager. He was known as "Pajarito" (Little Bird) in Spain and as "Abdallah Málaga" in Morocco.

A midfielder, he began playing at Stade Marocain and moved to Spain in 1957, where he remained for the rest of his career. He totalled 210 games and 13 goals in La Liga and the Segunda División for Granada and Málaga, winning the latter title with both clubs. He also played eight international games for Morocco.

As a manager, he led six clubs in Spain's second division, including two spells at Málaga, a team he remained associated with into his 80s.

== Early life ==
Ben Barek was born in Rabat, and first practiced football by kicking a ball at the Royal Palace of Rabat; his father was the chauffeur to King Mohammed V, and he was a childhood friend of the future Hassan II of Morocco.

== Club career ==
=== Stade Marocain ===
Ben Barek began playing for Stade Marocain and gained the attention of France's A.S. Saint-Étienne, but his father forbade the teenager from moving. In 1956, the French and Spanish protectorates in Morocco ended, meaning that teams from the whole country played in the Botola; a good performance by Ben Barek in the formerly Spanish-ruled city of Tetuán earned him the attention of AD Ceuta, but he disliked what he saw of the Spanish club and held out in the hopes of attracting a bigger suitor.

In his next game after his Tetuán exploits, Ben Barek played in a local derby against Fath Union Sport, whose team included the former Atlético Madrid player and national celebrity Larbi Benbarek. Benbarek, who was not related, introduced Ben Barek to directors from Granada CF of Spain's Segunda División, and personally convinced the young man's father to let him emigrate.

=== Granada ===
Ben Barek had no passport or documentation, but Granada urged the police of Tetuán to let him enter Spain. He scored twice on his debut in a friendly match against Club Recreativo Granada, including with his first touch, and earned a contract of 60,000 Spanish pesetas and a salary of 3,000 per month. Ben Barek earned promotion to La Liga in his first season at Granada, and helped keep them in the top flight a year later.

=== Málaga ===
According to the Spanish league's rules in 1958, teams could only have two foreigners, and only one of those could not be South American. Granada dealt with the retirement of goalkeeper Candi by signing Portugal international Carlos Gomes, thereby ending Ben Barek's future at the club. CD Málaga, whose president Julio Parres had businesses in Morocco, signed the player; he had previously been in negotiations for a 100,000 peseta contract with Real Murcia, who signed a different Moroccan instead. Ben Barek remained at Málaga for a decade, playing three seasons in La Liga and the remainder in the second tier.

== International career ==
Ben Barek played eight games for the Morocco national football team, among them the 1962 FIFA World Cup qualifying playoffs against the Spain side of Alfredo Di Stéfano, Ferenc Puskás and Paco Gento. In the second game in Madrid, he scored the final goal of a 3–2 loss; he had been playing with an injured leg, but did not tell either his club or his national team so that he could still be paid.

== Coaching career ==
Ben Barek began his coaching career with Atlético Malagueño, Málaga's reserve team, later going on to lead second-tier teams such as Deportivo Alavés. He was the director of the Morocco national team at the 1986 FIFA World Cup, where they were the first team from the Confederation of African Football to reach the second round.

During Ben Barek's spell with the Royal Moroccan Football Federation, Hassan II commissioned him to find young players in the kingdom. One player he discovered was Noureddine Naybet; then a right-winger, Ben Barek put him in defence during an injury emergency, and he went on to have a successful career in that position.

In the 1991–92 Segunda División, Ben Barek led Málaga to the playoff final, where they lost to nearby Cádiz CF, shortly before his club's dissolution. He then became a consultant for the reformed Málaga CF.

In May 2018, gate number 6 at La Rosaleda Stadium in Málaga was named after Ben Barek.
