= Olawumi Fayemi-Obayelu =

Nigerian politician

Olawumi A. Fayemi-Obayelu
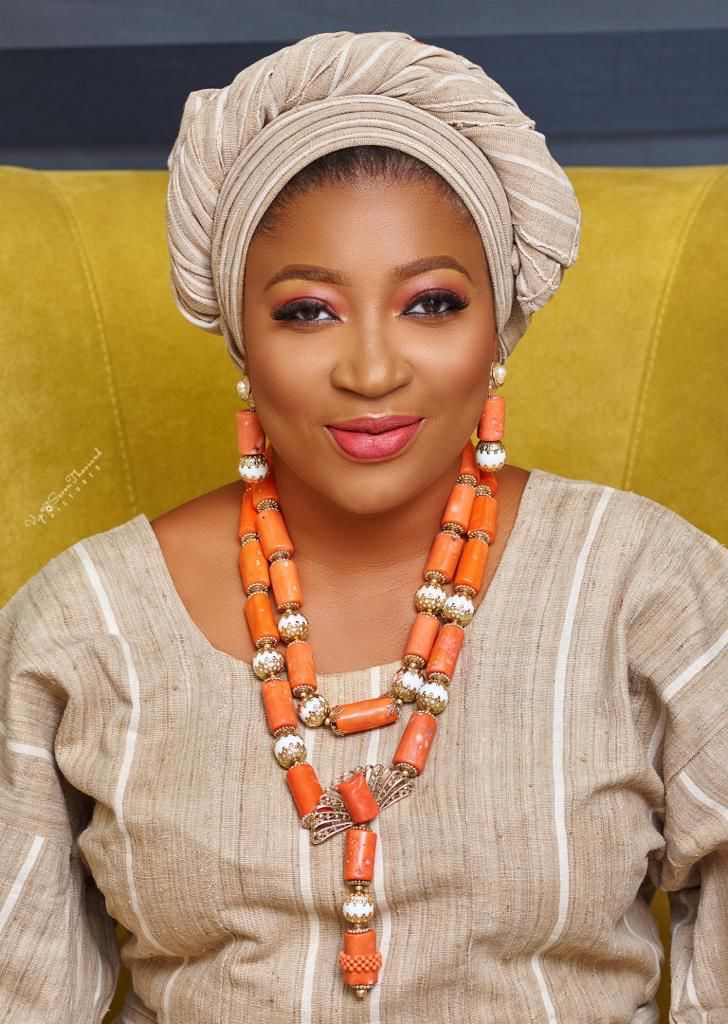

Member of the Ondo State House Of Assembly
- Incumbent
- Assumed office 2023
- Constituency: Ilaje II

Personal details
- Born: 20 March 1986 (age 40) Lagos State, Nigeria
- Party: All Progressives Congress (APC)
- Education: University of Lagos

Olawumi Annah Fayemi-Obayelu (born 20 March 1986) is a Nigerian politician and currently a member of Ondo state House Of Assembly representing Ilaje II, on the platform of the All Progressives Congress All Progressives Congress (APC).

== Early life and education ==
Olawumi was born on 20 March 1986, in Lagos State to the royal family of the Akenneyin dynasty at Amapetu's palace, Ode-Mahin. She is a native of Mahintedo community in Ilaje Local Government Area of Ondo State, Nigeria. Olawumi obtained her primary school leaving certificate from St. Mary's Nursery/Primary School in Okoko in 1996 and her secondary school WAEC/NECO from Lagos State Model College in Ojo in 2002. She holds a B.Sc. in Business Administration from Lagos State University and completed her MBA in Masters in Business Administration with specialties in Human Resource Management.

== Career ==
Olawumi began her professional career at Mausley Oil & Gas LTD, where she served as a product marketer, product supply coordinator, and operational manager. In 2011, she joined Jonore International Concept as Chief Administrator. She also worked with other reputable organisations, which includes MOTOMEDIA (publisher of Moto Shoppers & Swag magazine) from 2012-2013, where she led the marketing department, and Total Secure Nig. Ltd from 2013-2018, where she was the Human Resource personnel/Procurement manager. In 2023, she was elected as member of the Ondo state House Of assembly representing Ilaje Constituency 2. She have served several committee such as chairman of the House Committee on Women Affairs in Ondo state. She also holds additional professional certifications in areas such as fashion design, branding, and management .

- In July 2023, she appointed ten constituency aides to enhance legislative engagement and improve outreach within her constituency.
- She is actively involved in promoting women's rights, regularly engages with social development commissioners, and empowers her constituents through vocational training programs and humanitarian support initiatives.

== Awards ==
Olawumi was recognized for her commitment to gender advocacy and was named "Outstanding Gender Equity Crusader of the Year" by Trumpet Magazine in May 2025.

She is married with children.
