= Ignaz Puschnik =

Austrian footballer (1934–2020)

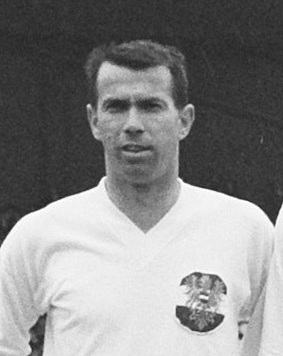
- Ignaz Puschnik in 1964

Personal information
- Date of birth: 5 February 1934
- Place of birth: Austria
- Date of death: 17 December 2020 (aged 86)
- Position: Midfielder

Senior career*
Years	Team	Apps	(Gls)
1954–1964	Kapfenberger SV		

International career
1957–1964	Austria	6	(0)
- * Club domestic league appearances and goals

Ignaz Puschnik (5 February 1934 – 17 December 2020) was an Austrian football midfielder who played for Austria in the 1958 FIFA World Cup. He also played for Kapfenberger SV.

Puschnik died on 17 December 2020, at the age of 86.
