= Alfredo Pérez (footballer) =

Argentine footballer

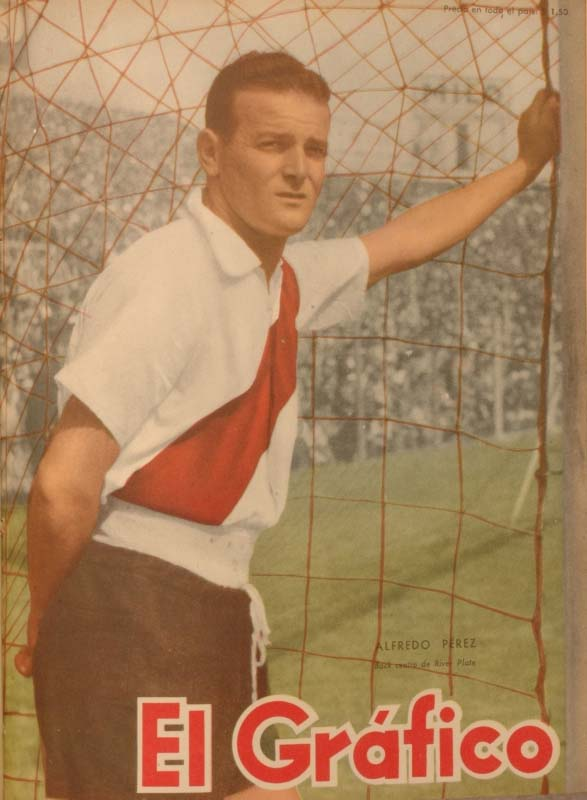
- Alfredo Pérez while playing for River Plate

Personal information
- Full name: Alfredo Ricardo Pérez
- Date of birth: 10 April 1929
- Place of birth: Argentina
- Date of death: 23 August 1994 (aged 65)
- Position: Defender

Senior career*
Years	Team	Apps	(Gls)
- Club Atlético River Plate

International career
- Argentina
- * Club domestic league appearances and goals

Alfredo Ricardo Pérez (10 April 1929 – 23 August 1994) was an Argentine football defender who played for Argentina in the 1958 FIFA World Cup. He also played for Club Atlético River Plate.

== Clubs ==
Club	Country	Years
Rosario Central	Argentina	1949 - 1950
River Plate	Argentina	1951 - 1960
