= Eligio Insfrán =

Paraguayan footballer (1926–1997)

Personal information
- Full name: Eligio Antonio Insfrán Orué
- Date of birth: 6 November 1926
- Place of birth: Limpio, Paraguay
- Date of death: 21 June 1997 (aged 70)
- Position: Forward

Senior career*
Years	Team	Apps	(Gls)
- Club Guaraní

International career
1955-1963	Paraguay	14	(1)
- * Club domestic league appearances and goals

Eligio Antonio Insfrán Orué (6 November 1926 – 21 June 1997) was a Paraguayan football forward who played for Paraguay in the 1958 FIFA World Cup. He also played for Club Guaraní. Insfrán died on 21 June 1997, at the age of 70.
