= Brahim Zehhar =

Moroccan footballer

Personal information
- Full name: Brahim Zehhar
- Date of birth: March 25, 1935 (age 91)
- Place of birth: Casablanca, Morocco
- Position: Striker

Senior career*
Years	Team	Apps	(Gls)
1949–1955	USA		
1955–1958	Racing Paris		
1955	→Besançon (loan)		
1958–1959	CA Paris		
1959–1960	Olympique Alès		
1960–1961	SEC Bastia		
1961	AS Béziers		
1961–1964	Girondins de Bordeaux		
1964–1965	TAS Casablanca		

International career
1959–1963	Morocco		
- * Club domestic league appearances and goals

Brahim Zehhar (born 25 March 1935 in Casablanca, Morocco), commonly known as Tatum, is a retired Moroccan footballer.
