= Helmut Bicek =

American soccer player

Helmut Bicek is a retired U.S. soccer player who spent most of his career with the Los Angeles Soccer Club. He earned five caps, scoring two goals, with the U.S. national team between 1960 and 1965. Bicek earned his first caps and scored his first national team goal in a 3–3 tie with Mexico on November 6, 1960. He played again seven days later, a loss to Mexico. That loss kept the U.S. out of the 1962 FIFA World Cup. Bicek did not play for the national team again until a March 7, 1965 tie with Mexico in which Bicek again scored. His last cap came ten days later in a 1–0 victory over Honduras. Both games in 1965 were qualification games for the 1966 FIFA World Cup.
