= Bruno Engelmeier =

Austrian footballer (1927–1991)

Personal information
- Date of birth: 5 September 1927
- Place of birth: Vienna, Austria
- Date of death: 2 July 1991 (aged 63)
- Position: Goalkeeper

Senior career*
Years	Team	Apps	(Gls)
1946–1954	First Vienna FC		
1955–1961	1. Simmeringer SC		

International career
1949–1958	Austria	11	(0)
- * Club domestic league appearances and goals

Bruno Engelmeier (5 September 1927 – 2 July 1991) was an Austrian football goalkeeper who played for Austria in the 1958 FIFA World Cup. He was also part of Austria's squad for the football tournament at the 1948 Summer Olympics, but he did not play in any matches. He also played for First Vienna FC and 1. Simmeringer SC.
