= Federico Edwards =

Argentine footballer (1931–2016)

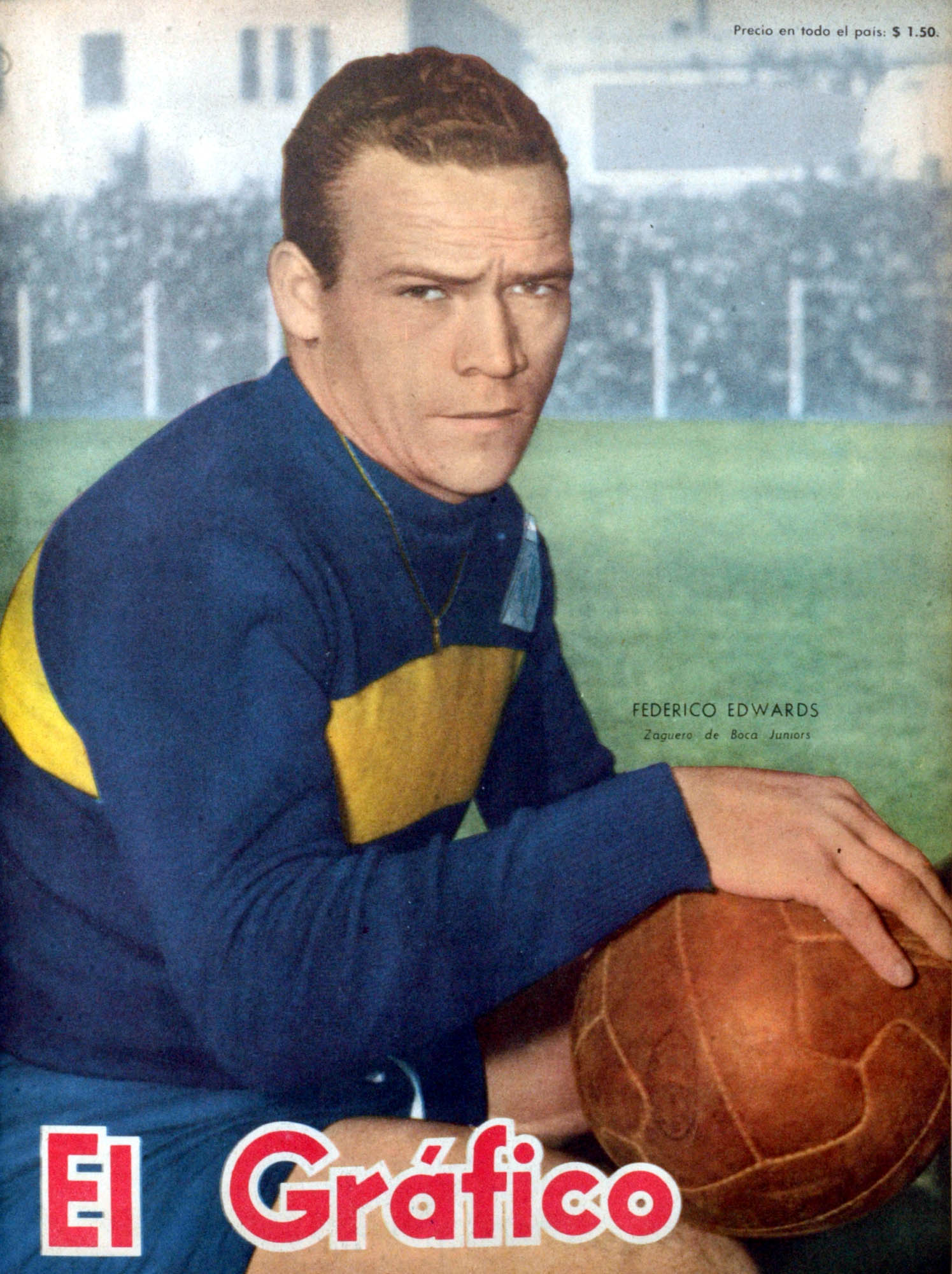
- Edwards on the cover of El Gráfico in 1955

Personal information
- Full name: Federico Roberto Edwards
- Date of birth: 25 January 1931
- Place of birth: Santa Fe, Argentina
- Date of death: 13 November 2016 (aged 85)
- Place of death: Santa Fe, Argentina
- Position: Defender

Senior career*
Years	Team	Apps	(Gls)
1949–1950	Unión Santa Fe		
1950–1960	Boca Juniors	157	(14)
1960	Independiente		
1961	Green Cross	26	(3)

International career
1954–1958	Argentina		
- * Club domestic league appearances and goals

Federico Roberto Edwards (25 January 1931 in Santa Fe, Argentina – 13 November 2016 in Santa Fe, Argentina) was an Argentine football defender who played for Argentina in the 1958 FIFA World Cup.

== Teams ==
- (Argentina) Unión Santa Fe 1949–1950
- (Argentina) Boca Juniors 1950–1960
- (Argentina) Independiente 1960
- (Chile) Green Cross 1961
