= Dejo Fayemi =

Nigerian footballer

Personal information
- Date of birth: 1933
- Date of death: 2 December 2016
- Place of death: Ibadan, Nigeria

International career
Years	Team	Apps	(Gls)
1959–1961	Nigeria	15	(7)

Dejo Fayemi was a Nigerian footballer.

Fayemi was part of the team that unsuccessfully attempted to qualify for the 1960 Summer Olympics.

He scored Nigeria's first ever goal in a World Cup qualifier, it came against Ghana on 28 August 1960 in a 4-1 loss.
