= 1962 FIFA World Cup qualification (inter-confederation play-offs) =

Tournament details
- Dates: 8 October – 26 November 1961
- Teams: 6 (from 5 confederations)

Tournament statistics
- Matches played: 6
- Goals scored: 17 (2.83 per match)
- Attendance: 196,000 (32,667 per match)
- Top scorer(s): (Socialist Federal Republic of Yugoslavia) Milan Galić (3 goals)

For the 1962 FIFA World Cup qualification, there were three inter-confederation play-offs to determine the final three qualification spots to the 1962 FIFA World Cup. The matches were played between 8 October – 26 November 1961.

== Format ==
The six teams from the five confederations (AFC, CAF, CONMEBOL, NAFC, and UEFA) were drawn into three ties.

In each tie, the two teams played a two-legged home-and-away series. The three winners, decided on aggregate score, qualified for the 1962 FIFA World Cup in Chile.

== Qualified teams ==
Confederation	Placement	Team
AFC	Round-robin winners	South Korea
CAF	Second round winners	Morocco
CCCF/NAFC	Second round winners	Mexico
CONMEBOL	Randomly drawn into play-offs	Paraguay
UEFA	Group 9 winners	Spain
UEFA	Group 10 winners	Yugoslavia

== Matches ==
The matches were played between 8 October – 26 November 1961.

=== CAF v UEFA ===
Pos	Team	Pld	W	D	L	GF	GA	GD	Pts	Qualification	(Spain)	(Morocco)
1	Spain	2	2	0	0	4	2	+2	4	1962 FIFA World Cup	—	3–2
2	Morocco	2	0	0	2	2	4	−2	0		0–1	—

Source: RSSSF
12 November 1961

Morocco	0–1	Spain
		Del Sol 80'

Stade d'honneur, Casablanca
Attendance: 26,000
Referee: Daniel Mellet (Switzerland)
23 November 1961

Spain	3–2	Morocco
Marcelino 12'; Di Stéfano 44'; Collar 58'		Riahi 40'; Ben Barek 64'

Santiago Bernabéu, Madrid
Attendance: 30,000
Referee: Cesare Jonni (Italy)

=== UEFA v AFC ===
Pos	Team	Pld	W	D	L	GF	GA	GD	Pts	Qualification	(Socialist Federal Republic of Yugoslavia)	(South Korea)
1	Yugoslavia	2	2	0	0	8	2	+6	4	1962 FIFA World Cup	—	5–1
2	South Korea	2	0	0	2	2	8	−6	0		1–3	—

Source: RSSSF
8 October 1961

Yugoslavia	5–1	South Korea
Čebinac 42'; Šekularac 54', 70'; Radaković 67'; Galić 89'		Chung Sun-cheon 82'

JNA Stadium, Belgrade
Attendance: 20,000
Referee: Konstantinos Ioannidis (Greece)
26 November 1961

South Korea	1–3	Yugoslavia
Yoo Pan-sun 61'		Galić 17', 27'; Jerković 89'

Hyochang Stadium, Seoul
Attendance: 25,000
Referee: Mak Xeun Fei (Hong Kong)

=== CCCF/NAFC v CONMEBOL ===
Pos	Team	Pld	W	D	L	GF	GA	GD	Pts	Qualification	(Mexico)	(Paraguay)
1	Mexico	2	1	1	0	1	0	+1	3	1962 FIFA World Cup	—	1–0
2	Paraguay	2	0	1	1	0	1	−1	1		0–0	—

Source: RSSSF
29 October 1961

Mexico	1–0	Paraguay
Reyes 20'

Estadio Olímpico Universitario, Mexico City
Attendance: 80,000
Referee: Walter van Rosberg (Netherlands Antilles)
5 November 1961

Paraguay	0–0	Mexico

Estadio de Puerto Sajonia, Asunción
Attendance: 15,000
Referee: Pablo Victor Vaga Albergatti (Uruguay)

== Goalscorers ==
There were 17 goals scored in 6 matches, for an average of 2.83 goals per match.

3 goals

- (Socialist Federal Republic of Yugoslavia) Milan Galić

2 goals

- (Socialist Federal Republic of Yugoslavia) Dragoslav Šekularac

1 goal

- (Mexico) Salvador Reyes
- (Morocco) Abdallah Ben Barek
- (Morocco) Mohamed Riahi
- (South Korea) Chung Soon-cheon
- (South Korea) Yoo Pan-soon
- (Spain) Enrique Collar
- (Spain) Alfredo Di Stéfano
- (Spain) Marcelino
- (Spain) Luis del Sol
- (Socialist Federal Republic of Yugoslavia) Zvezdan Čebinac
- (Socialist Federal Republic of Yugoslavia) Dražan Jerković
- (Socialist Federal Republic of Yugoslavia) Petar Radaković
