= Tommy Hamill =

Northern Ireland footballer (1929-1996)

Personal information
- Date of birth: 4 March 1929
- Place of birth: Northern Ireland
- Date of death: 28 March 1996 (aged 67)

International career
| Years | Team | Apps | (Gls) |
- Northern Ireland

Thomas Hamill (4 March 1929 - 28 March 1996) was a Northern Irish footballer. He played for Linfield, and won 1 Northern Ireland B cap (1957), and 14 Irish League caps (1953–1958), and was a non-travelling member of the 1958 World Cup squad.
