= László Lachos =

Hungarian footballer

Personal information
- Date of birth: 17 January 1933
- Place of birth: Balassagyarmat, Hungary
- Date of death: 20 September 2004 (aged 71)
- Place of death: Hungary
- Position: Forward

Senior career*
Years	Team	Apps	(Gls)
1951–1954	Salgótarján	50	(11)
1955–1963	FC Tatabánya	170	(83)
Total		220	(94)
- * Club domestic league appearances and goals

László Lachos (17 January 1933 – 20 September 2004) was a Hungarian football forward who was a member of the Hungary national team at the 1958 FIFA World Cup. However, he was never capped for his country. Lachos was born in Balassagyarmat, Hungary. In addition to the national team, he also played for FC Tatabánya.
