= Ramón Mayeregger =

Paraguayan footballer

Personal information
- Full name: Ramón Galarza Mayeregger
- Date of birth: 5 March 1934 or 1936
- Place of birth: Asunción, Paraguay
- Date of death: before 2021
- Position: Goalkeeper

Senior career*
Years	Team	Apps	(Gls)
1957–1962	Nacional		
1963–1966	Emelec		

International career
1957–1961	Paraguay	15	(0)
- * Club domestic league appearances and goals

Ramón Galarza Mayeregger (also spelled Maggeregger; 5 March 1934 or 1936 – before 2021) was a Paraguayan football goalkeeper who played for Paraguay in the 1958 FIFA World Cup. He also played for Club Nacional. Mayeregger is deceased. His younger half-brother, Luis Galarza, was an international goalkeeper for Bolivia.
