= Luis Santos Silva =

Paraguayan footballer

Personal information
- Full name: Luis Santos Silva
- Place of birth: Paraguay
- Position: Midfielder

Senior career*
Years	Team	Apps	(Gls)
- Cerro Porteño

International career
1955	Paraguay	1	(0)
- * Club domestic league appearances and goals

Luis Santos Silva is a Paraguayan football midfielder who played for Paraguay in the 1958 FIFA World Cup. He also played for Cerro Porteño.
