= Kazimír Gajdoš =

Slovak footballer

Personal information
- Date of birth: 28 March 1934
- Place of birth: Brusno, Czechoslovakia
- Date of death: 8 November 2016 (aged 82)
- Place of death: Bratislava, Slovakia
- Position: Right winger

Senior career*
Years	Team	Apps	(Gls)
1953	Tatran Prešov		
1954–1955	Slovan Bratislava		
1955–1965	Slovnaft Bratislava (Note: Slovnaft Bratislava was known as ČH Bratislava until 1962.)		

International career
1957	Czechoslovakia	4	(0)
- * Club domestic league appearances and goals

Kazimír Gajdoš (28 March 1934 – 8 November 2016) was a Slovak professional footballer who played as a right winger. He played for the Czechoslovak national team.

== Life and career ==
Gajdoš was born in Brusno near Banská Bystrica on 28 March 1934. At club level, he played for Tatran Prešov, Slovan Bratislava, and Slovnaft Bratislava. Gajdoš earned four caps for the Czechoslovakia national football team in 1957 and participated in the 1954 as well as 1958 FIFA World Cup, but played in neither tournament.

Gajdoš played mostly as a right winger. He died in Bratislava on 8 November 2016 after a serious illness.
