= Oszkár Szigeti =

Hungarian footballer

Personal information
- Date of birth: 10 September 1933
- Place of birth: Miskolc, Hungary
- Date of death: 6 May 1983 (aged 49)
- Position: Defender

Senior career*
Years	Team	Apps	(Gls)
?–1952	Perecesi TK	?	(?)
1952–1967	Diósgyőri VTK	219	(13)

International career
1958	Hungary	1	(0)
- * Club domestic league appearances and goals

Oszkár Szigeti (10 September 1933 – 6 May 1983) was a Hungarian football defender who played for Hungary in the 1958 FIFA World Cup. He also played for Diósgyőri VTK.
