= 2018 FIFA World Cup =

Association football tournament in Russia

Чемпионат мира по футболу FIFA 2018 (Russian) Chempionat mira po futbolu FIFA 2018

Tournament details
- Host country: Russia
- Dates: 14 June – 15 July
- Teams: 32 (from 5 confederations)
- Venues: 12 (in 11 host cities)

Final positions
- Champions: France (2nd title)
- Runners-up: Croatia
- Third place: Belgium
- Fourth place: England

Tournament statistics
- Matches played: 64
- Goals scored: 169 (2.64 per match)
- Attendance: 3,031,768 (47,371 per match)
- Top scorer: (England) Harry Kane (6 goals)
- Best player: (Croatia) Luka Modrić
- Best young player: (France) Kylian Mbappé
- Best goalkeeper: (Belgium) Thibaut Courtois
- Fair play award: Spain

The 2018 FIFA World Cup (Russian: Чемпионат мира по футболу 2018 года) was the 21st FIFA World Cup, the quadrennial world championship for national football teams organised by FIFA. It took place in Russia from 14 June to 15 July 2018, after the country was awarded the hosting rights in late 2010. It was the eleventh time the championships had been held in Europe and the first time they were held in Russia, also featuring one or two venues, depending on definition, located across the boundary with Asia. At an estimated cost of over $14.2 billion, it was the most expensive World Cup ever held until it was surpassed by the 2022 World Cup in Qatar.

The tournament phase involved 32 teams, of which 31 came through qualifying competitions, while the host nation Russia qualified automatically. Of the 32, 20 had also appeared in the 2014 event, while Iceland and Panama each made their debut at the World Cup. 64 matches were played in 12 venues across 11 cities. Germany, the defending champions, were eliminated in the group stage for the first time since 1938. Host nation Russia was eliminated in the quarter-finals. In the final, France played Croatia on 15 July at Luzhniki Stadium in Moscow. France won the match 4–2, claiming their second World Cup and becoming the fourth consecutive European winners after Italy in 2006, Spain in 2010, and Germany in 2014—a new record for teams representing the same continent. (Note: Alternatively, if one accepts the claim that the football tournaments at the 1924 and 1928 Summer Olympics should be counted as the first association football world championships, then in 2014 European teams repeated the three wins in a row streak achieved by South Americans earlier, as the two Olympic football tournaments and the first edition of the FIFA World Cup in 1930 were won by Uruguay.)

Croatian player Luka Modrić was voted the tournament's best player and awarded the Golden Ball. England's Harry Kane won the Golden Boot after scoring the most goals during the tournament with six. Belgium's Thibaut Courtois won the Golden Glove, awarded to the goalkeeper with the best performance. Kylian Mbappé was voted the World Cup Best Young Player and became the second teenager, after Pelé, to score in a World Cup final. It has been estimated that more than 3 million people attended games during the tournament.

== Host selection ==
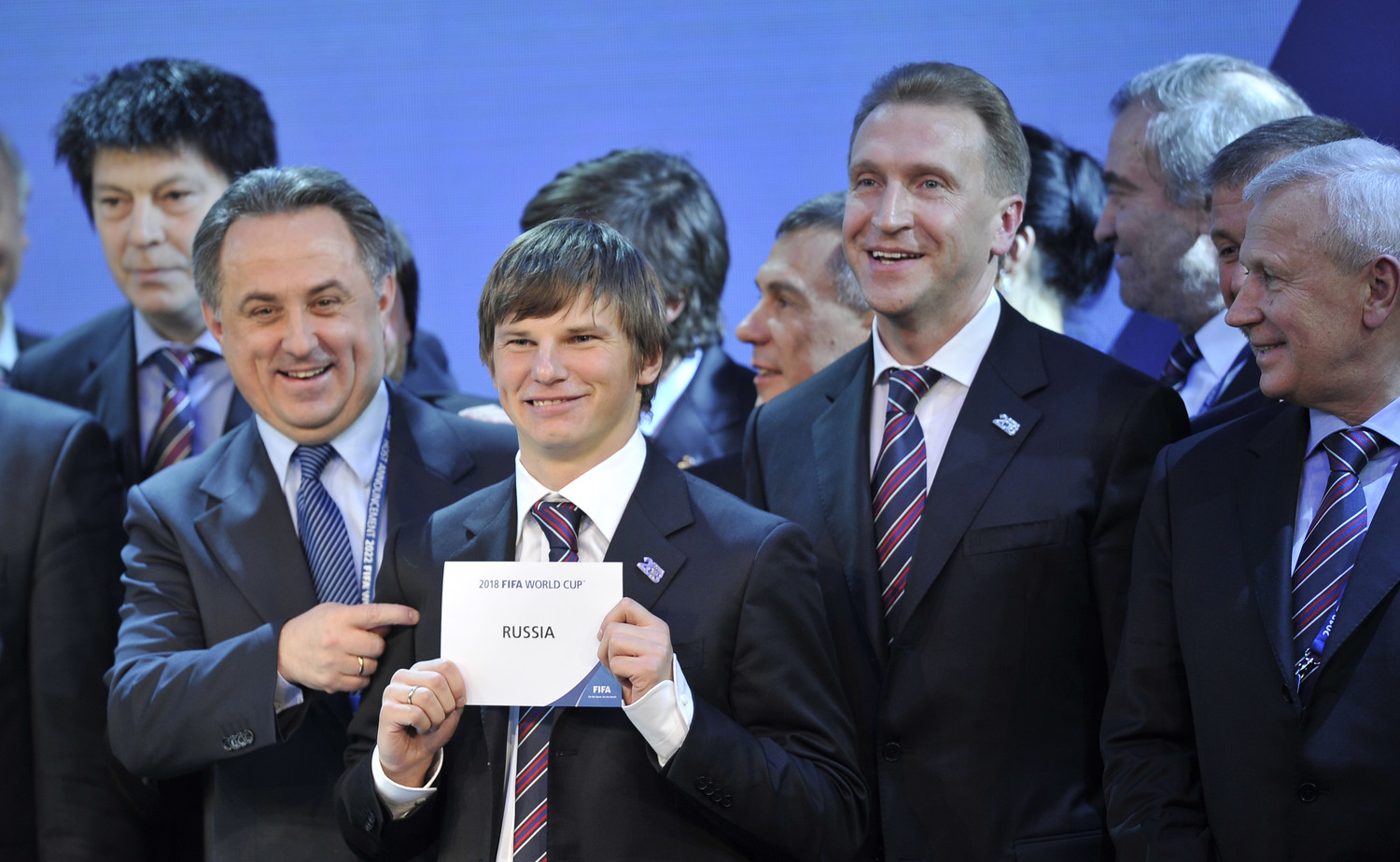
Andrey Arshavin with Russian bid personnel celebrate the awarding of the 2018 World Cup to Russia on 2 December 2010.

The bidding procedure to host the 2018 and 2022 FIFA World Cup tournaments began in January 2009, and national associations had until 2 February 2009 to register their interest. Initially, nine countries placed bids for the 2018 FIFA World Cup, but Mexico later withdrew from the proceedings, and Indonesia's bid was rejected by FIFA in February 2010 after the Indonesian government failed to submit a letter to support the bid. During the bidding process, the three remaining non-UEFA nations (Australia, Japan, and the United States) gradually withdrew from the 2018 bids, and thus all UEFA nations were ruled out of the 2022 bid. As such, there were eventually four bids for the 2018 FIFA World Cup, two of which were joint bids: England, Russia, Netherlands/Belgium, and Portugal/Spain.

The 22-member FIFA Executive Committee convened in Zürich on 2 December 2010 to vote to select the hosts of both tournaments. Russia won the right to be the 2018 host in the second round of voting. The Portugal/Spain bid came second, and that from Belgium/Netherlands third. England, which was bidding to host its second tournament, was eliminated in the first round.

The voting results were:

2018 FIFA bidding (majority 12 votes)
Bidders	Votes	
Bidders	Round 1	Round 2
Russia	9	13
Portugal / Spain	7	7
Belgium / Netherlands	4	2
England	2	Eliminated

=== Host selection criticism ===
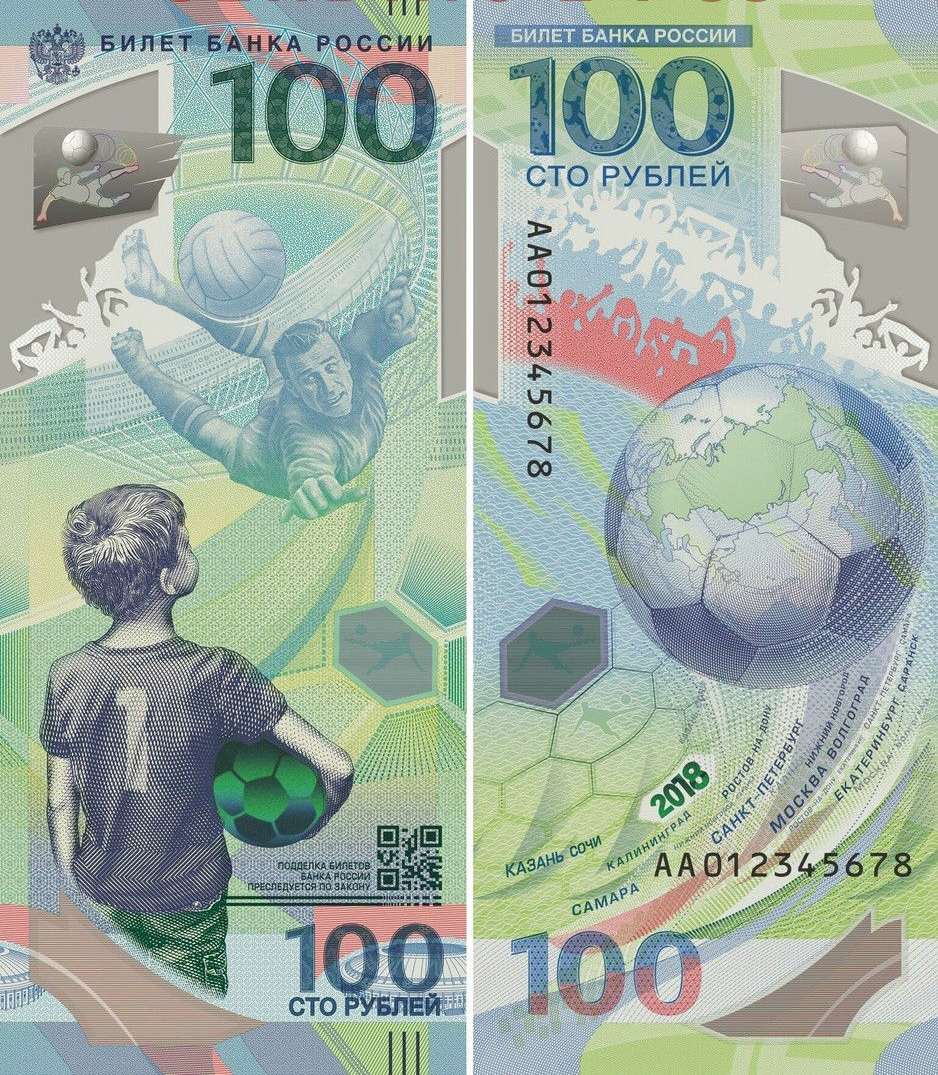
The 100-ruble commemorative banknote celebrates the 2018 FIFA World Cup. It features an image of Soviet goalkeeper Lev Yashin.

The choice of Russia as host was controversial. Issues included the high level of racism in Russian football, human rights abuses by Russian authorities, and discrimination against LGBT people in government (including gay propaganda laws) along with wider Russian society. Russia's annexation of Crimea had also prompted calls for the tournament to be moved. In 2014, FIFA president Sepp Blatter stated that "the World Cup has been given and voted to Russia and we are going forward with our work".

Russia was criticised for alleged abuse of migrant labourers in the construction of World Cup venues, with Human Rights Watch reporting cases where workers were left unpaid, made to work in dangerously cold conditions, or suffering reprisals for raising concerns. A few pundits claimed it was slave labour. In May 2017, FIFA president Gianni Infantino admitted there had been human rights abuses of North Korean workers involved in the construction of Saint Petersburg's Zenit Arena. By June 2017, at least 17 workers had died on World Cup construction sites, according to Building and Wood Workers' International. In August, a group of eight US senators called on FIFA to consider dismissing Russia as the World Cup host if an independent investigation verified allegations of North Koreans being subjected to forced labour.

Racism and Neo-nazi symbols displayed in the past by some Russian football fans drew criticism, with documented incidents of racial chants, banners spewing hate-filled messages, and sometimes assaults on people from the Caucasus and Central Asia. In March 2015, FIFA's then Vice-President Jeffrey Webb said that Russia posed a huge challenge from a racism standpoint, and that a World Cup could not be held there under the current conditions. On July, United Nations anti-discrimination official Yuri Boychenko said that Russian soccer authorities had failed to fully grasp what racism was and needed to do more to combat it. To address this as well as concerns of hooliganism in general, Russian intelligence services blacklisted over 400 fans from entering the stadiums by June 2018, with 32 other countries also sending officers to help local police screen attendees for valid ID cards.

Allegations of corruption in the bidding processes and concerns over bribery on the part of the Russian team and corruption by FIFA members for the 2018 and 2022 World Cups led to threats from England's FA to boycott the tournament. They claimed that four members of the executive committee had requested bribes to vote for England, and Sepp Blatter had said it had already been arranged before the vote that Russia would win. FIFA appointed Michael J. Garcia, a US attorney, to investigate and produce a report on the corruption allegations. Although the report was never published, FIFA released a 42-page summary of its findings as determined by German judge Hans-Joachim Eckert. Eckert's summary cleared Russia and Qatar of any wrongdoing, but was denounced by critics as a whitewash. Because of the controversy, the FA refused to accept Eckert's absolving Russia from blame. Greg Dyke called for a re-examination of the affair and David Bernstein called for a boycott of the World Cup. Garcia criticised the summary as being "materially incomplete" with "erroneous representations of the facts and conclusions", and appealed to FIFA's Appeal Committee. The committee declined to hear his appeal, so Garcia resigned to protest of FIFA's conduct, citing a "lack of leadership" and lack of confidence in Eckert's independence.

On 3 June 2015, the FBI confirmed that federal authorities were investigating the bidding and awarding processes for the 2018 and 2022 World Cups. In an interview published on 7 June 2015, Domenico Scala, the head of FIFA's Audit And Compliance Committee, stated that "should there be evidence that the awards to Qatar and Russia came only because of bought votes, then the awards could be cancelled". Prince William of Wales and former British Prime Minister David Cameron attended a meeting with FIFA vice-president Chung Mong-joon in which a vote-trading deal for the right to host the 2018 World Cup in England was discussed.

== Teams ==
=== Qualification ===
For the first time in the history of the FIFA World Cup, all eligible nations—the 209 FIFA member associations except automatically qualified hosts Russia—applied to enter the qualifying process. Zimbabwe and Indonesia were later disqualified before playing their first matches, while Gibraltar and Kosovo, who joined FIFA on 13 May 2016 after the qualifying draw but before European qualifying had begun, also entered the competition. Places in the tournament were allocated to continental confederations, with the allocation unchanged from the 2014 World Cup. The first qualification game, between Timor-Leste and Mongolia, began in Dili on 12 March 2015 as part of the AFC's qualification, and the main qualifying draw took place at the Konstantinovsky Palace in Strelna, Saint Petersburg, on 25 July 2015.

Of the 32 nations qualified to play at the 2018 FIFA World Cup, 20 countries competed at the previous tournament. Both Iceland and Panama qualified for the first time, with the former becoming the smallest country in terms of population to reach the World Cup until Curaçao and Cape Verde qualified for 2026.

==== Qualified teams ====
AFC (5)

- Australia (36)
- Iran (37)
- Japan (61)
- Saudi Arabia (67)
- South Korea (57)

CAF (5)

- Egypt (45)
- Morocco (41)
- Nigeria (48)
- Senegal (27)
- Tunisia (21)

CONCACAF (3)

- Costa Rica (23)
- Mexico (15)
- Panama (55) (debut)

CONMEBOL (5)

- Argentina (5)
- Brazil (2)
- Colombia (16)
- Peru (11)
- Uruguay (14)

OFC (0)

- None qualified

UEFA (14)

- Belgium (3)
- Croatia (20)
- Denmark (joint 12)
- England (joint 12)
- France (7)
- Germany (1)
- Iceland (22) (debut)
- Poland (8)
- Portugal (4)
- Russia (70) (hosts)
- Serbia (34)
- Spain (10)
- Sweden (24)
- Switzerland (6)

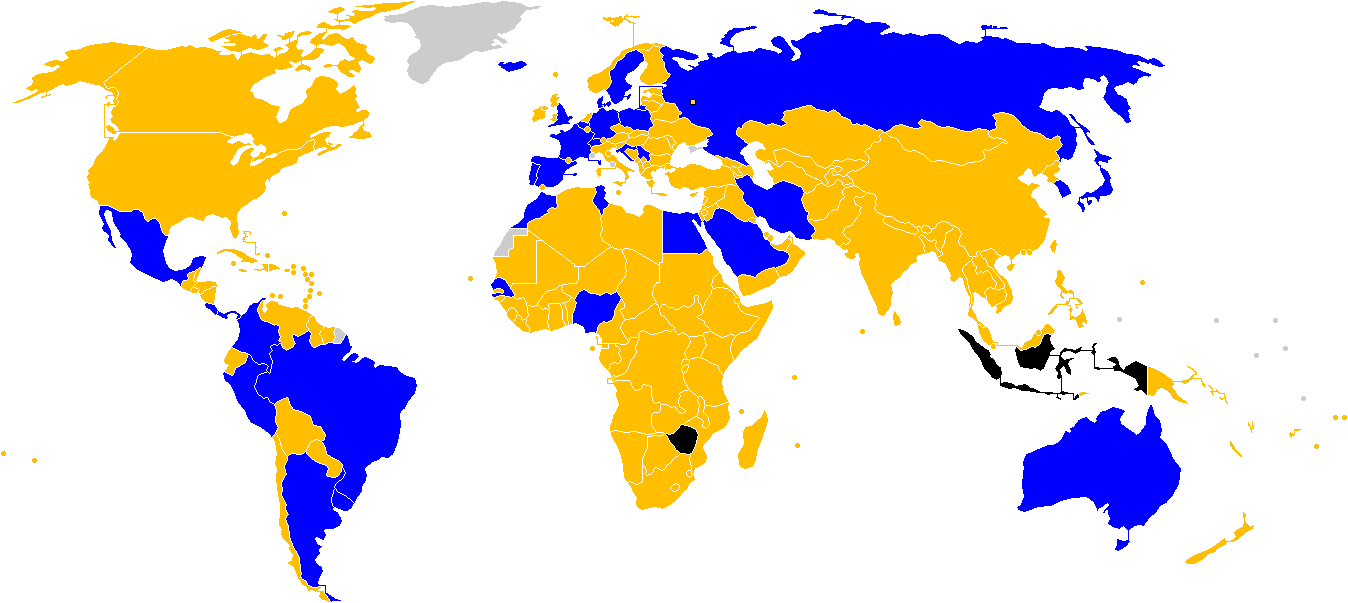
Qualified Did not qualify Disqualified Not a FIFA member

=== Draw ===
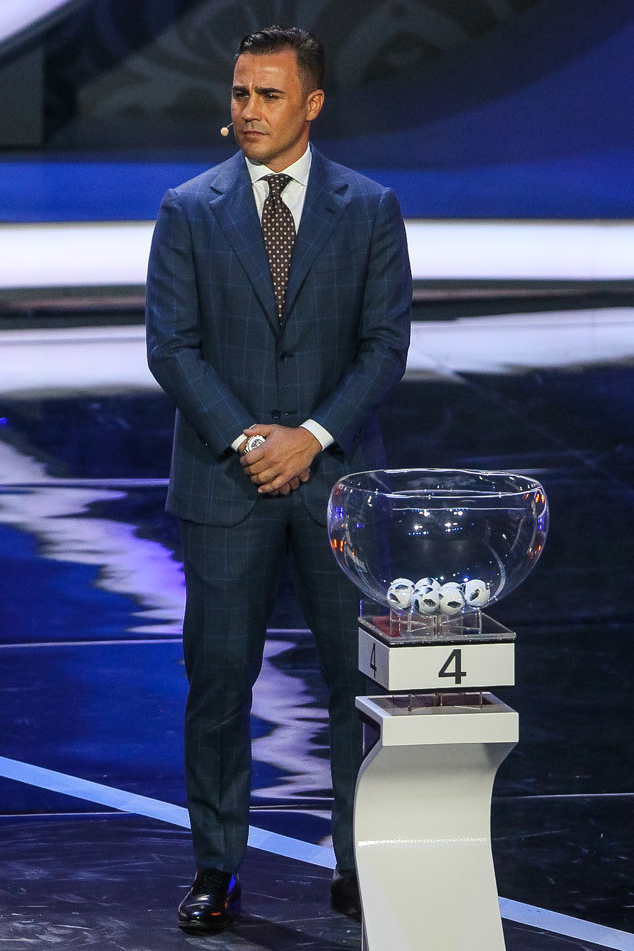
Italian World Cup winner Fabio Cannavaro in Moscow at the 2018 World Cup draw

The draw was held on 1 December 2017 at 18:00 MSK at the State Kremlin Palace in Moscow. The draw was conducted by former footballer Gary Lineker alongside Russian sports journalist Maria Komandnaya, with several well-known football personalities assisting, including Diego Maradona, Fabio Cannavaro, Cafu, Diego Forlán, Gordon Banks, Carles Puyol, Laurent Blanc, and former Russian player Nikita Simonyan. The 32 teams were drawn into eight groups of four, by selecting one team from each of the four ranked pots.

For the draw, the teams were allocated to four pots based entirely on the FIFA World Rankings of October 2017. Pot one contained the hosts Russia (who were automatically assigned to position A1) and the best seven teams. Pot two contained the next best eight teams, and so on for pots three and four. This was different from previous draws, when only pot one was based on FIFA rankings while the remaining pots were based on geographical considerations. However, teams from the same confederation still were not drawn against each other for the group stage, except that two UEFA teams could be in each group. The pots for the draw are shown below.

Pot 1	Pot 2	Pot 3	Pot 4
Russia (65) (hosts); Germany (1); Brazil (2); Portugal (3); Argentina (4); Belgium (5); Poland (6); France (7)	Spain (8); Peru (10); Switzerland (11); England (12); Colombia (13); Mexico (16); Uruguay (17); Croatia (18)	Denmark (19); Iceland (21); Costa Rica (22); Sweden (25); Tunisia (28); Egypt (30); Senegal (32); Iran (34)	Serbia (38); Nigeria (41); Australia (43); Japan (44); Morocco (48); Panama (49); South Korea (62); Saudi Arabia (63)

Group A	Group B	Group C	Group D
Russia	Portugal	France	Argentina
Saudi Arabia	Spain	Australia	Iceland
Egypt	Morocco	Peru	Croatia
Uruguay	Iran	Denmark	Nigeria
Group E	Group F	Group G	Group H
Brazil	Germany	Belgium	Poland
Switzerland	Mexico	Panama	Senegal
Costa Rica	Sweden	Tunisia	Colombia
Serbia	South Korea	England	Japan

== Squads ==
Initially, each team had to name a preliminary squad of 30 players, but in February 2018 this was increased to 35. From the preliminary squad, the team had to name a final squad of 23 players (three of whom had to be goalkeepers) by 4 June. Players in the final squad could be replaced for serious injury up to 24 hours prior to kickoff of the team's first match. These replacements did not need to have been named in the preliminary squad.

For players named in the 35-player preliminary squad, there was a mandatory rest period between 21 and 27 May 2018, except for those involved in the 2018 UEFA Champions League Final played on 26 May.

== Officiating ==
On 29 March 2018, FIFA released the list of 36 referees and 63 assistant referees selected to oversee matches. On 30 April 2018, FIFA released the list of 13 video assistant referees, who acted solely in this capacity in the tournament.

Referee Fahad Al-Mirdasi of Saudi Arabia was removed on 30 May 2018 over a match-fixing attempt, along with his two assistant referees, compatriots Mohammed Al-Abakry and Abdulah Al-Shalwai. A new referee was not appointed, but two assistant referees, Hasan Al Mahri of the United Arab Emirates and Hiroshi Yamauchi of Japan, were added to the list. Assistant referee Marwa Range of Kenya also withdrew after the BBC released an investigation conducted by a Ghanaian journalist which implicated him in a bribery scandal.

List of officials
Confederation	Referee	Assistant referees	Video assistant referees
AFC	Alireza Faghani (Iran)	Reza Sokhandan (Iran); Mohammadreza Mansouri (Iran)	Abdulrahman Al-Jassim (Qatar)
AFC	Ravshan Irmatov (Uzbekistan)	Abdukhamidullo Rasulov (Uzbekistan); Jakhongir Saidov (Uzbekistan)	Abdulrahman Al-Jassim (Qatar)
AFC	Mohammed Abdulla Hassan Mohamed (United Arab Emirates)	Mohamed Al Hammadi (United Arab Emirates); Hasan Al Mahri (United Arab Emirates)	Abdulrahman Al-Jassim (Qatar)
AFC	Ryuji Sato (Japan)	Toru Sagara (Japan); Hiroshi Yamauchi (Japan)	Abdulrahman Al-Jassim (Qatar)
AFC	Nawaf Shukralla (Bahrain)	Yaser Tulefat (Bahrain); Taleb Al Maari (Qatar)	Abdulrahman Al-Jassim (Qatar)
CAF	Mehdi Abid Charef (Algeria)	Anouar Hmila (Tunisia)	
CAF	Malang Diedhiou (Senegal)	Djibril Camara (Senegal); El Hadji Samba (Senegal)	
CAF	Bakary Gassama (Gambia)	Jean Claude Birumushahu (Burundi); Abdelhak Etchiali (Algeria)	
CAF	Gehad Grisha (Egypt)	Redouane Achik (Morocco); Waleed Ahmed (Sudan)	
CAF	Janny Sikazwe (Zambia)	Jerson Dos Santos (Angola); Zakhele Siwela (South Africa)	
CAF	Bamlak Tessema Weyesa (Ethiopia)		
CONCACAF	Joel Aguilar (El Salvador)	Juan Zumba (El Salvador); Juan Carlos Mora (Costa Rica)	
CONCACAF	Mark Geiger (United States)	Frank Anderson (United States); Joe Fletcher (Canada)	
CONCACAF	Jair Marrufo (United States)	Corey Rockwell (United States)	
CONCACAF	Ricardo Montero (Costa Rica)		
CONCACAF	John Pitti (Panama)	Gabriel Victoria (Panama)	
CONCACAF	César Arturo Ramos (Mexico)	Marvin Torrentera (Mexico); Miguel Hernández (Mexico)	
CONMEBOL	Julio Bascuñán (Chile)	Carlos Astroza (Chile); Christian Schiemann (Chile)	Wilton Sampaio (Brazil); Gery Vargas (Bolivia); Mauro Vigliano (Argentina)
CONMEBOL	Enrique Cáceres (Paraguay)	Eduardo Cardozo (Paraguay); Juan Zorrilla (Paraguay)	Wilton Sampaio (Brazil); Gery Vargas (Bolivia); Mauro Vigliano (Argentina)
CONMEBOL	Andrés Cunha (Uruguay)	Nicolás Taran (Uruguay); Mauricio Espinosa (Uruguay)	Wilton Sampaio (Brazil); Gery Vargas (Bolivia); Mauro Vigliano (Argentina)
CONMEBOL	Néstor Pitana (Argentina)	Hernán Maidana (Argentina); Juan Pablo Belatti (Argentina)	Wilton Sampaio (Brazil); Gery Vargas (Bolivia); Mauro Vigliano (Argentina)
CONMEBOL	Sandro Ricci (Brazil)	Emerson de Carvalho (Brazil); Marcelo Van Gasse (Brazil)	Wilton Sampaio (Brazil); Gery Vargas (Bolivia); Mauro Vigliano (Argentina)
CONMEBOL	Wilmar Roldán (Colombia)	Alexander Guzmán (Colombia); Cristian de la Cruz (Colombia)	Wilton Sampaio (Brazil); Gery Vargas (Bolivia); Mauro Vigliano (Argentina)
OFC	Matthew Conger (New Zealand)	Simon Lount (New Zealand); Tevita Makasini (Tonga)	
OFC	Norbert Hauata (Tahiti)	Bertrand Brial (New Caledonia)	
UEFA	Felix Brych (Germany)	Mark Borsch (Germany); Stefan Lupp (Germany)	Bastian Dankert (Germany); Artur Soares Dias (Portugal); Paweł Gil (Poland); Massimiliano Irrati (Italy); Tiago Martins (Portugal); Danny Makkelie (Netherlands); Daniele Orsato (Italy); Paolo Valeri (Italy); Felix Zwayer (Germany)
UEFA	Cüneyt Çakır (Turkey)	Bahattin Duran (Turkey); Tarık Ongun (Turkey)	Bastian Dankert (Germany); Artur Soares Dias (Portugal); Paweł Gil (Poland); Massimiliano Irrati (Italy); Tiago Martins (Portugal); Danny Makkelie (Netherlands); Daniele Orsato (Italy); Paolo Valeri (Italy); Felix Zwayer (Germany)
UEFA	Sergei Karasev (Russia)	Anton Averianov (Russia); Tikhon Kalugin (Russia)	Bastian Dankert (Germany); Artur Soares Dias (Portugal); Paweł Gil (Poland); Massimiliano Irrati (Italy); Tiago Martins (Portugal); Danny Makkelie (Netherlands); Daniele Orsato (Italy); Paolo Valeri (Italy); Felix Zwayer (Germany)
UEFA	Björn Kuipers (Netherlands)	Sander van Roekel (Netherlands); Erwin Zeinstra (Netherlands)	Bastian Dankert (Germany); Artur Soares Dias (Portugal); Paweł Gil (Poland); Massimiliano Irrati (Italy); Tiago Martins (Portugal); Danny Makkelie (Netherlands); Daniele Orsato (Italy); Paolo Valeri (Italy); Felix Zwayer (Germany)
UEFA	Szymon Marciniak (Poland)	Paweł Sokolnicki (Poland); Tomasz Listkiewicz (Poland)	Bastian Dankert (Germany); Artur Soares Dias (Portugal); Paweł Gil (Poland); Massimiliano Irrati (Italy); Tiago Martins (Portugal); Danny Makkelie (Netherlands); Daniele Orsato (Italy); Paolo Valeri (Italy); Felix Zwayer (Germany)
UEFA	Antonio Mateu Lahoz (Spain)	Pau Cebrián Devís (Spain); Roberto Díaz Pérez (Spain)	Bastian Dankert (Germany); Artur Soares Dias (Portugal); Paweł Gil (Poland); Massimiliano Irrati (Italy); Tiago Martins (Portugal); Danny Makkelie (Netherlands); Daniele Orsato (Italy); Paolo Valeri (Italy); Felix Zwayer (Germany)
UEFA	Milorad Mažić (Serbia)	Milovan Ristić (Serbia); Dalibor Đurđević (Serbia)	Bastian Dankert (Germany); Artur Soares Dias (Portugal); Paweł Gil (Poland); Massimiliano Irrati (Italy); Tiago Martins (Portugal); Danny Makkelie (Netherlands); Daniele Orsato (Italy); Paolo Valeri (Italy); Felix Zwayer (Germany)
UEFA	Gianluca Rocchi (Italy)	Elenito Di Liberatore (Italy); Mauro Tonolini (Italy)	Bastian Dankert (Germany); Artur Soares Dias (Portugal); Paweł Gil (Poland); Massimiliano Irrati (Italy); Tiago Martins (Portugal); Danny Makkelie (Netherlands); Daniele Orsato (Italy); Paolo Valeri (Italy); Felix Zwayer (Germany)
UEFA	Damir Skomina (Slovenia)	Jure Praprotnik (Slovenia); Robert Vukan (Slovenia)	Bastian Dankert (Germany); Artur Soares Dias (Portugal); Paweł Gil (Poland); Massimiliano Irrati (Italy); Tiago Martins (Portugal); Danny Makkelie (Netherlands); Daniele Orsato (Italy); Paolo Valeri (Italy); Felix Zwayer (Germany)
UEFA	Clément Turpin (France)	Cyril Gringore (France); Nicolas Danos (France)	Bastian Dankert (Germany); Artur Soares Dias (Portugal); Paweł Gil (Poland); Massimiliano Irrati (Italy); Tiago Martins (Portugal); Danny Makkelie (Netherlands); Daniele Orsato (Italy); Paolo Valeri (Italy); Felix Zwayer (Germany)

=== Video assistant referees ===
Shortly after the International Football Association Board's decision to incorporate video assistant referees (VARs) into the Laws of the game (LOTG) on 16 March 2018, the FIFA Council took the much-anticipated step of approving the use of VAR for the first time in a FIFA World Cup tournament.

VAR operations for all games were operated from a single headquarters in Moscow, which received live video of the games and were in radio contact with the on-field referees. Systems were in place for communicating VAR-related information to broadcasters and visuals on stadiums' large screens were used for the fans in attendance.

VAR had a significant impact on several games. On 15 June 2018, Diego Costa's first goal against Portugal became the first World Cup goal based on a VAR decision; the first penalty as a result of a VAR decision was awarded to France in their match against Australia on 16 June and resulted in a goal by Antoine Griezmann. A record number of penalties were awarded in the tournament, a phenomenon partially attributed to VAR. Overall, the new technology was both praised and criticised by commentators. FIFA declared the implementation of VAR a success after the first week of competition.

== Venues ==
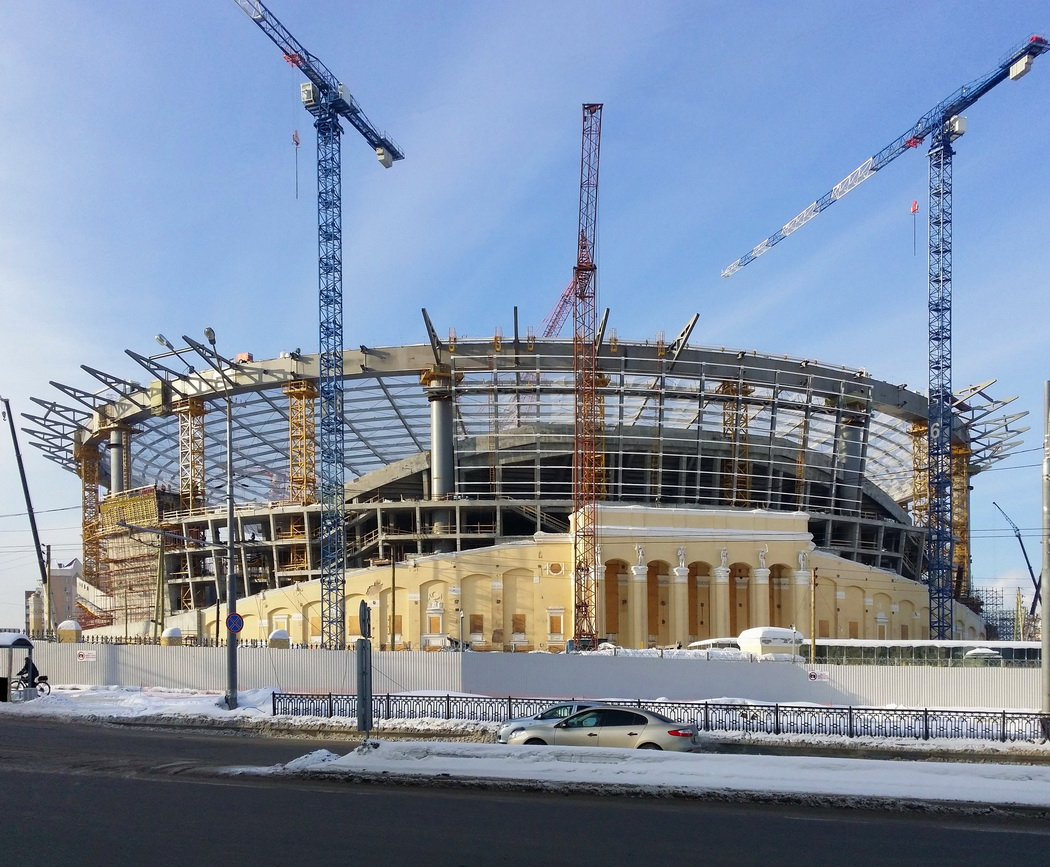
Reconstruction of the Yekaterinburg Central Stadium in January 2017

Russia proposed the following host cities: Kaliningrad, Kazan, Krasnodar, Moscow, Nizhny Novgorod, Rostov-on-Don, Saint Petersburg, Samara, Saransk, Sochi, Volgograd, Yaroslavl, and Yekaterinburg. To reduce travel time for the teams in the huge country, each chosen city was located in or close to European Russia (those geographically in Asia being Yekaterinburg and, according to some definitions for the border, Sochi). The bid evaluation report stated: "The Russian bid proposes 13 host cities and 16 stadiums, thus exceeding FIFA's minimum requirement. Three of the 16 stadiums would be renovated, and 13 would be newly constructed."

In October 2011, Russia reduced the number of stadiums from 16 to 14. Construction of the proposed Podolsk stadium in the Moscow Oblast was cancelled by the regional government. Also, in the capital, Lukoil Arena was competing with VTB Arena over which would be constructed first.

The final choice of host cities was announced on 29 September 2012. The number of cities was reduced further to 11 and the number of stadiums to 12 as Krasnodar and Yaroslavl were dropped from the final list. Of the 12 stadiums used for the tournament, three (Luzhniki, Yekaterinburg and Sochi) had been extensively renovated and the other nine were brand new; $11.8 billion was spent on hosting the tournament.

Sepp Blatter had said in July 2014 that, given the concerns over the completion of venues in Russia, the number of venues for the tournament may be reduced from 12 to 10. He also said, "We are not going to be in a situation, as is the case of one, two or even three stadiums in 2010 FIFA World Cup, where it is a problem of what you do with these stadiums".

In October 2014, on their first official visit to Russia, FIFA's inspection committee and its head, Chris Unger, visited St. Petersburg, Sochi, Kazan and both Moscow venues. They were satisfied with the progress. On 8 October 2015, FIFA and the local organising committee agreed on the official names of the stadiums to be used during the tournament. Of the twelve venues, the Luzhniki Stadium in Moscow and the Saint Petersburg Stadium—the two largest stadiums in Russia—were used most; both hosted seven matches. Sochi, Kazan, Nizhny Novgorod and Samara each hosted six matches, including one quarter-final match each, while the Otkritie Stadium in Moscow and the Rostov Stadium hosted five matches, including one round-of-16 match each. Volgograd Arena, Kaliningrad Stadium, Central Stadium (Yekaterinburg) and Mordovia Arena each hosted four matches, but did not host any knockout stage games.

=== Stadiums ===
Location of the host cities of the 2018 FIFA World Cup in Russia

Twelve stadiums in eleven Russian cities were built or renovated for the FIFA World Cup. Between 2010 (when Russia was announced as host) and 2018, nine of the twelve stadiums were built (some in place of older, outdated venues) and the other three were renovated for the tournament.

- Kaliningrad: Kaliningrad Stadium (new). The first piles were driven into the ground in September 2015. On 11 April 2018 it hosted its first match.
- Kazan: Kazan Arena (new). The stadium was built for the 2013 Summer Universiade. It has since hosted the 2015 World Aquatics Championships and the 2017 FIFA Confederations Cup. It serves as a home arena for FC Rubin Kazan.
- Moscow: Luzhniki Stadium (heavily renovated). The largest stadium in the country, it was closed for renovation in 2013. It was commissioned in November 2017.
- Moscow: Spartak Stadium (new). This stadium is the home arena to its namesake FC Spartak Moscow. In accordance with FIFA requirements, during the 2018 World Cup, it was called Spartak Stadium instead of its usual name Otkritie Arena. It hosted its first match on 5 September 2014.
- Nizhny Novgorod: Nizhny Novgorod Stadium (new). Construction of this stadium commenced in 2015 and was completed in December 2017.
- Rostov-on-Don: Rostov Arena (new). The stadium is located on the left bank of the Don (river). Construction was completed on 22 December 2017.
- Saint Petersburg: Krestovsky Stadium (new). Construction commenced in 2007 after the site, formerly occupied by Kirov Stadium, was cleared. The project was officially completed on 29 December 2016. It has hosted 2017 FIFA Confederations Cup games and served as a venue for UEFA Euro 2020.
- Samara: Solidarnost Samara Arena (new). Construction officially started on 21 July 2014 and was completed on 21 April 2018.
- Saransk: Mordovia Arena (new). The stadium in Saransk was scheduled to be commissioned in 2012 in time for the opening of the all-Russian Spartakiad, but the plan was revised. The opening was rescheduled to 2017. The arena hosted its first match on 21 April 2018.
- Sochi: Fisht Olympic Stadium (slightly renovated). This stadium was opened in 2013 and subsequently hosted the opening and closing ceremonies of the 2014 Winter Olympics. Afterwards, it was renovated in preparation for the 2017 FIFA Confederations Cup and the 2018 World Cup.
- Volgograd: Volgograd Arena (new). The main Volgograd arena was built on the demolished Central Stadium site, at the foot of the Mamayev Kurgan memorial complex. It was commissioned on 3 April 2018.
- Yekaterinburg: Central Stadium (heavily renovated). The Central Stadium of Yekaterinburg had been renovated for the FIFA World Cup. Its stands have a capacity of 35,000 spectators. The renovation project was completed in December 2017.

Moscow		Saint Petersburg	Sochi
Luzhniki Stadium	Otkritie Arena (Spartak Stadium)	Krestovsky Stadium (Saint Petersburg Stadium)	Fisht Olympic Stadium (Fisht Stadium)
Capacity: 78,011	Capacity: 44,190	Capacity: 64,468	Capacity: 44,287
Volgograd	Rostov-on-Don	Nizhny Novgorod	Kazan
Volgograd Arena	Rostov Arena	Nizhny Novgorod Stadium	Kazan Arena
Capacity: 43,713	Capacity: 43,472	Capacity: 43,319	Capacity: 42,873
Samara	Saransk	Kaliningrad	Yekaterinburg
Samara Arena	Mordovia Arena	Kaliningrad Stadium	Central Stadium (Ekaterinburg Arena)
Capacity: 41,970	Capacity: 41,685	Capacity: 33,973	Capacity: 33,061

=== Team base camps ===
Base camps were used by the 32 national squads to stay and train before and during the World Cup tournament. On 9 February 2018, FIFA announced the base camps for each participating team.

- Argentina: Bronnitsy, Moscow Oblast
- Australia: Kazan, Tatarstan
- Belgium: Krasnogorsky, Moscow Oblast
- Brazil: Sochi, Krasnodar Krai
- Colombia: Verkhneuslonsky, Tatarstan
- Costa Rica: Saint Petersburg
- Croatia: Roshchino, Leningrad Oblast
- Denmark: Anapa, Krasnodar Krai
- Egypt: Grozny, Chechnya
- England: Repino, Saint Petersburg
- France: Istra, Moscow Oblast
- Germany: Vatutinki, Moscow
- Iceland: Gelendzhik, Krasnodar Krai
- Iran: Bakovka, Moscow Oblast
- Japan: Kazan, Tatarstan
- Mexico: Khimki, Moscow Oblast
- Morocco: Voronezh, Voronezh Oblast
- Nigeria: Yessentuki, Stavropol Krai
- Panama: Saransk, Mordovia
- Peru: Moscow
- Poland: Sochi, Krasnodar Krai
- Portugal: Ramenskoye, Moscow Oblast
- Russia: Khimki, Moscow Oblast
- Saudi Arabia: Saint Petersburg
- Senegal: Kaluga, Kaluga Oblast
- Serbia: Svetlogorsk, Kaliningrad Oblast
- South Korea: Saint Petersburg
- Spain: Krasnodar, Krasnodar Krai
- Sweden: Gelendzhik, Krasnodar Krai
- Switzerland: Togliatti, Samara Oblast
- Tunisia: Pervomayskoye, Moscow Oblast
- Uruguay: Bor, Nizhny Novgorod Oblast

== Preparation and costs ==
=== Budget ===
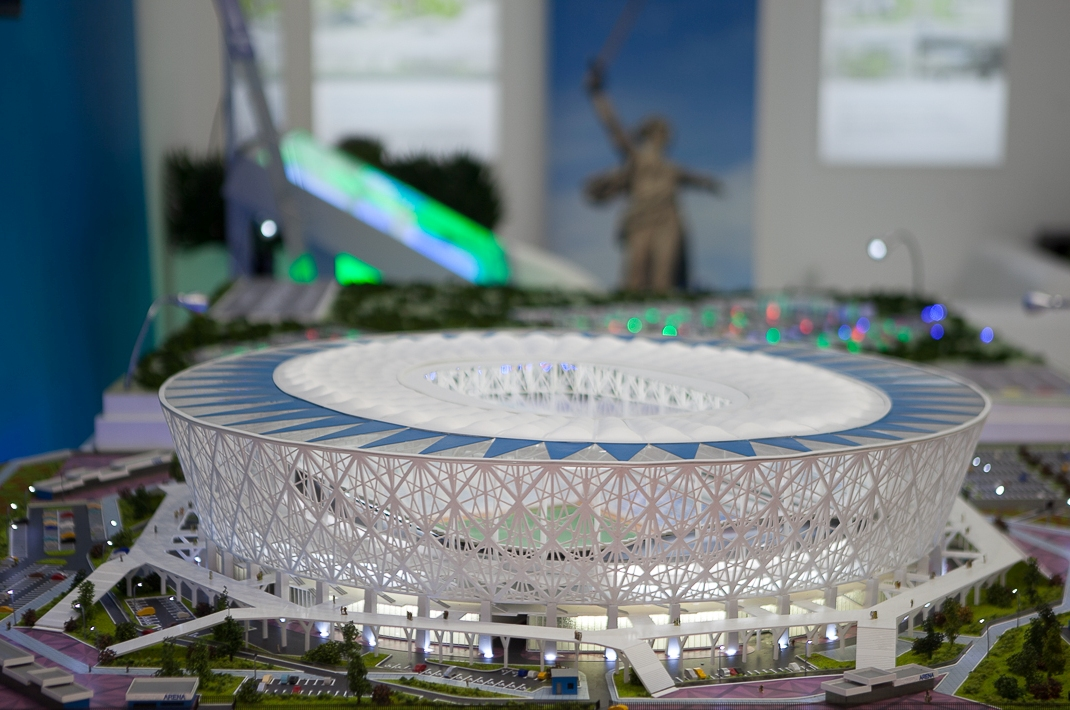
Scale model of the Volgograd Arena whose construction began in 2015.

At an estimated cost of over $14.2 billion as of June 2018, the 2018 FIFA event was the most expensive World Cup in history, surpassing the $11.6 billion cost of the 2014 FIFA World Cup in Brazil.

The Government of Russia had originally earmarked a budget of around $20 billion, which was later slashed to $10 billion, for World Cup preparations. Half was spent on transportation infrastructure. As part of the program to prepare for the 2018 FIFA World Cup, a federal sub-program—"Construction and Renovation of Transport Infrastructure"—was implemented with a total budget of ₽352.5 billion (rubles), with ₽170.3 billion coming from the federal budget, ₽35.1 billion from regional budgets, and ₽147.1 billion from investors. The biggest item of federal spending was the aviation infrastructure costing ₽117.8 billion. Construction of new hotels was a crucial area of infrastructure development in World Cup host cities. Costs continued to mount as preparations were underway.

=== Infrastructure spending ===
Platov International Airport in Rostov-on-Don was upgraded with automated air traffic control systems. Modern surveillance, navigation, communication, control, and meteorological support systems were also installed. Koltsovo International Airport in Yekaterinburg was upgraded with radio-engineering tools for flight operation and received a second runway. Saransk Airport received a new navigation system; two new hotels were constructed in the city—the Mercure Saransk Centre (Accor Hotels) and Four Points by Sheraton Saransk as well as few other smaller accommodation facilities. In Samara, new tram lines were laid. Khrabrovo Airport in Kaliningrad was upgraded with radio navigation and weather equipment. Renovation and upgraded radio-engineering tools for flight operations was completed in the Moscow, Saint Petersburg, Volgograd, Samara, Yekaterinburg, Kazan and Sochi airports. On 27 March, the Ministry of Construction, Housing and Utilities of Russia reported that all communications within its area of responsibility had been commissioned. The last facility commissioned was a waste treatment station in Volgograd. In Yekaterinburg, where four matches were hosted, hosting costs increased to over ₽7.4 billion, exceeding the ₽5.6 billion rubles originally allocated from the state and regional budget.

=== Volunteers ===
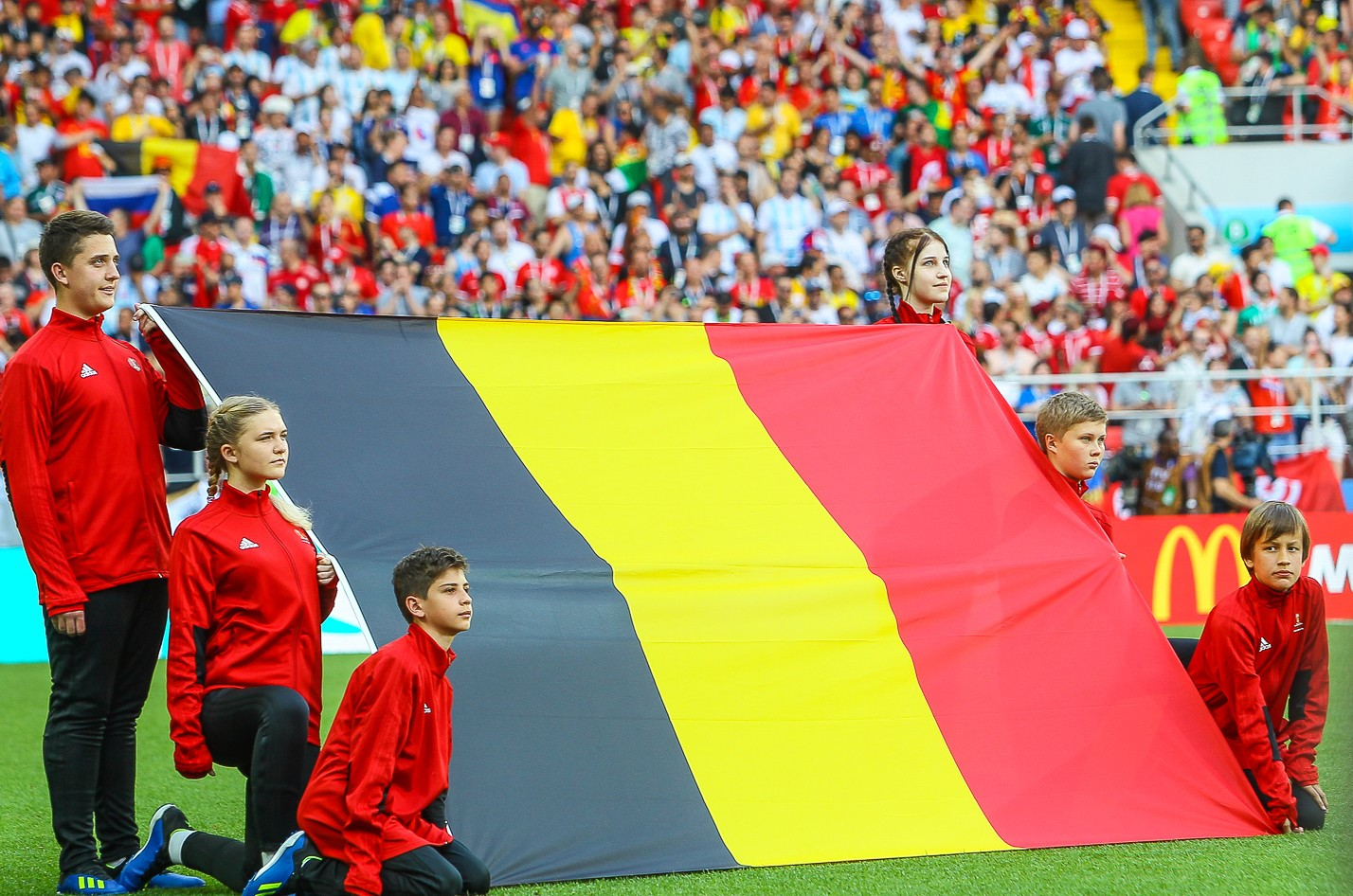
Volunteer flag bearers on the field prior to Belgium's (flag depicted) group stage match against Tunisia

Volunteer applications to the 2018 Russia Local Organising Committee opened on 1 June 2016. The 2018 FIFA World Cup Russia Volunteer Program received about 177,000 applications, and engaged a total of 35,000 volunteers. They received training at 15 Volunteer Centres of the local organising committee based in 15 universities, and in volunteer centres in the host cities. Preference, especially in key areas, was given to those with knowledge of a foreign language and volunteering experience, but not necessarily to Russian nationals.

=== Transport ===
Free public transport services were offered for ticketholders during the World Cup, including additional trains linking host cities, as well as services such as bus services within them.

== Schedule ==
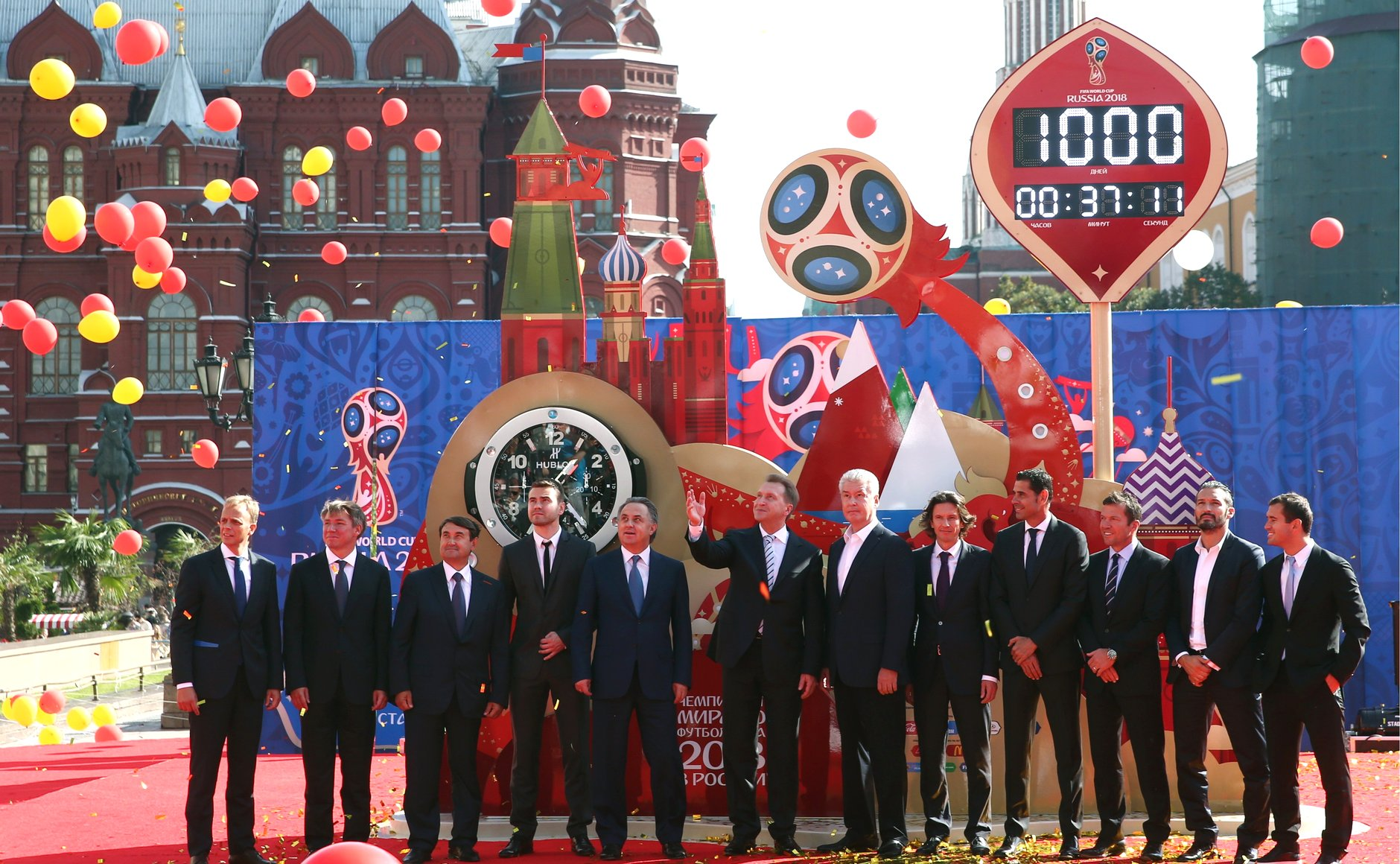
Launching of the 1,000 days countdown in Moscow

The full schedule was announced by FIFA on 24 July 2015 without kick-off times, which were confirmed later. On 1 December 2017, following the final draw, FIFA adjusted six kick-off times.

Russia was placed in position A1 in the group stage and played in the opening match at the Luzhniki Stadium in Moscow on 14 June against Saudi Arabia, the two lowest-ranked teams of the tournament at the time of the final draw. The Luzhniki Stadium also hosted the second semi-final on 11 July and the final on 15 July. The Krestovsky Stadium in Saint Petersburg hosted the first semi-final on 10 July and the match for third place on 14 July.

== Opening ceremony ==
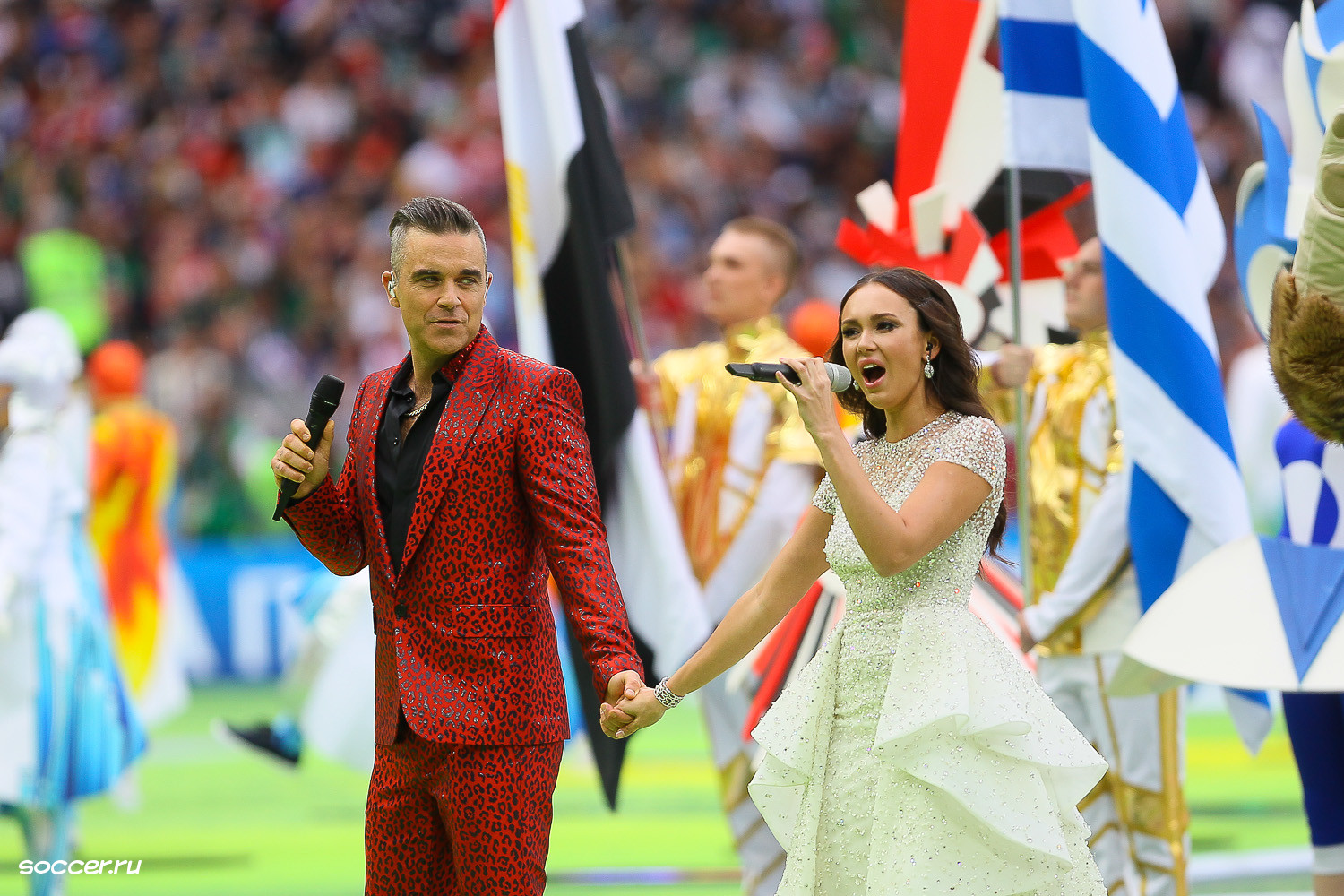
Soprano Aida Garifullina and pop singer Robbie Williams singing "Angels" at the opening ceremony

The opening ceremony took place on Thursday, 14 June 2018, at the Luzhniki Stadium in Moscow, preceding the opening match of the tournament between hosts Russia and Saudi Arabia.

At the start of the ceremony, Russian president Vladimir Putin gave a speech, welcoming the countries of the world to Russia and calling football a uniting force. Brazilian World Cup-winning striker Ronaldo entered the stadium with a child in a Russia jersey. Pop singer Robbie Williams then sang two of his songs solo before he and Russian soprano Aida Garifullina performed a duet. Dancers dressed in the flags of the 32 competing teams appeared carrying a sign with the name of each nation. At the end of the ceremony Ronaldo reappeared with the official match ball which had returned from the International Space Station in early June.

Young participants of the international children's social programme Football for Friendship from 211 countries and regions took part in the opening ceremony of the FIFA World Cup at the Luzhniki stadium.

== Group stage ==
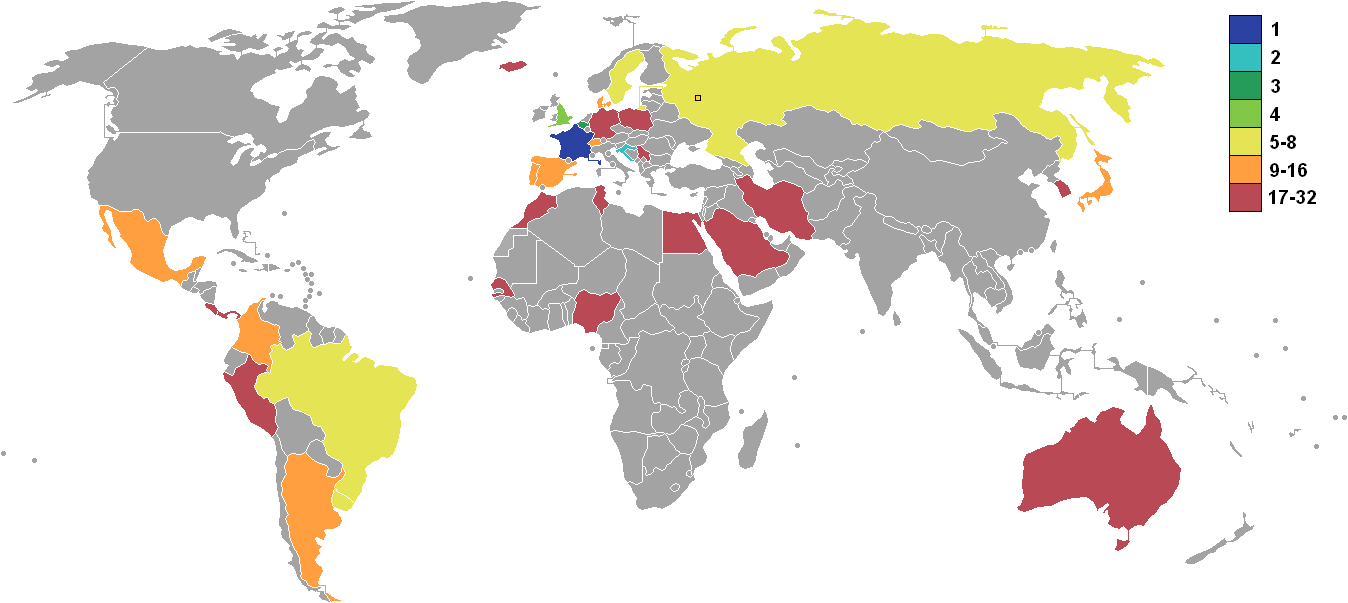
Champion Runner-up Third place Fourth place Quarter-finals Round of 16 Group stage

Competing countries were divided into eight groups of four teams (groups A to H). Teams in each group played one another in a round-robin, with the top two teams advancing to the knockout stage. Ten European teams and four South American teams progressed to the knockout stage, together with Japan and Mexico.

For the first time since 1938, Germany, the reigning champions, were eliminated in the first round. This was the third consecutive tournament in which the holders were eliminated in the first round, after Italy in 2010 and Spain in 2014. No African team progressed to the second round for the first time since 1982. The fair play criteria came into use for the first time when Japan qualified over Senegal because the team had received fewer yellow cards. Only one match, Denmark versus France, was goalless. Until then there were a record 36 straight games in which at least one goal was scored. All times listed below are local time.

Tie-breaking criteria for group play
The ranking of teams in the group stage was determined as follows:
1. Points obtained in all group matches;
2. Goal difference in all group matches;
3. Number of goals scored in all group matches;
4. Points obtained in the matches played between the teams in question;
5. Goal difference in the matches played between the teams in question;
6. Number of goals scored in the matches played between the teams in question;
7. Fair play points in all group matches (only one deduction could be applied to a player in a single match):
  - Yellow card: −1 points;
  - Indirect red card (second yellow card): −3 points;
  - Direct red card: −4 points;
  - Yellow card and direct red card: −5 points;
8. Drawing of lots.

=== Group A ===
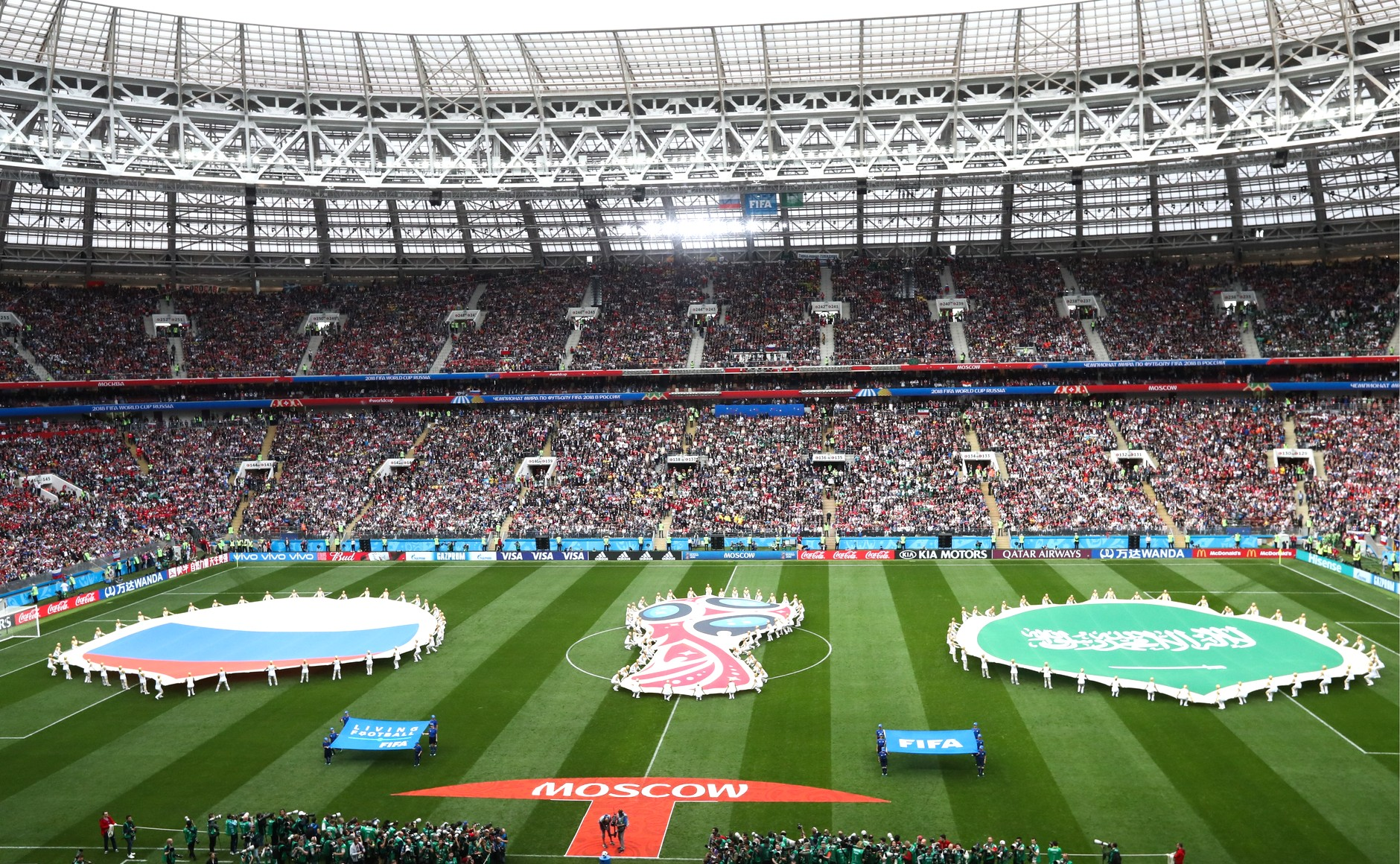
Pre-match ceremony prior to the opening game, Russia v Saudi Arabia

Pos	Team	Pld	W	D	L	GF	GA	GD	Pts	Qualification
1	Uruguay	3	3	0	0	5	0	+5	9	Advance to knockout stage
2	Russia (H)	3	2	0	1	8	4	+4	6	Advance to knockout stage
3	Saudi Arabia	3	1	0	2	2	7	−5	3	
4	Egypt	3	0	0	3	2	6	−4	0	

Source: FIFA
(H) Hosts

14 June 2018
Russia	5–0	Saudi Arabia	Luzhniki Stadium, Moscow
15 June 2018
Egypt	0–1	Uruguay	Central Stadium, Yekaterinburg
19 June 2018
Russia	3–1	Egypt	Krestovsky Stadium, Saint Petersburg
20 June 2018
Uruguay	1–0	Saudi Arabia	Rostov Arena, Rostov-on-Don
25 June 2018
Uruguay	3–0	Russia	Cosmos Arena, Samara
Saudi Arabia	2–1	Egypt	Volgograd Arena, Volgograd

=== Group B ===
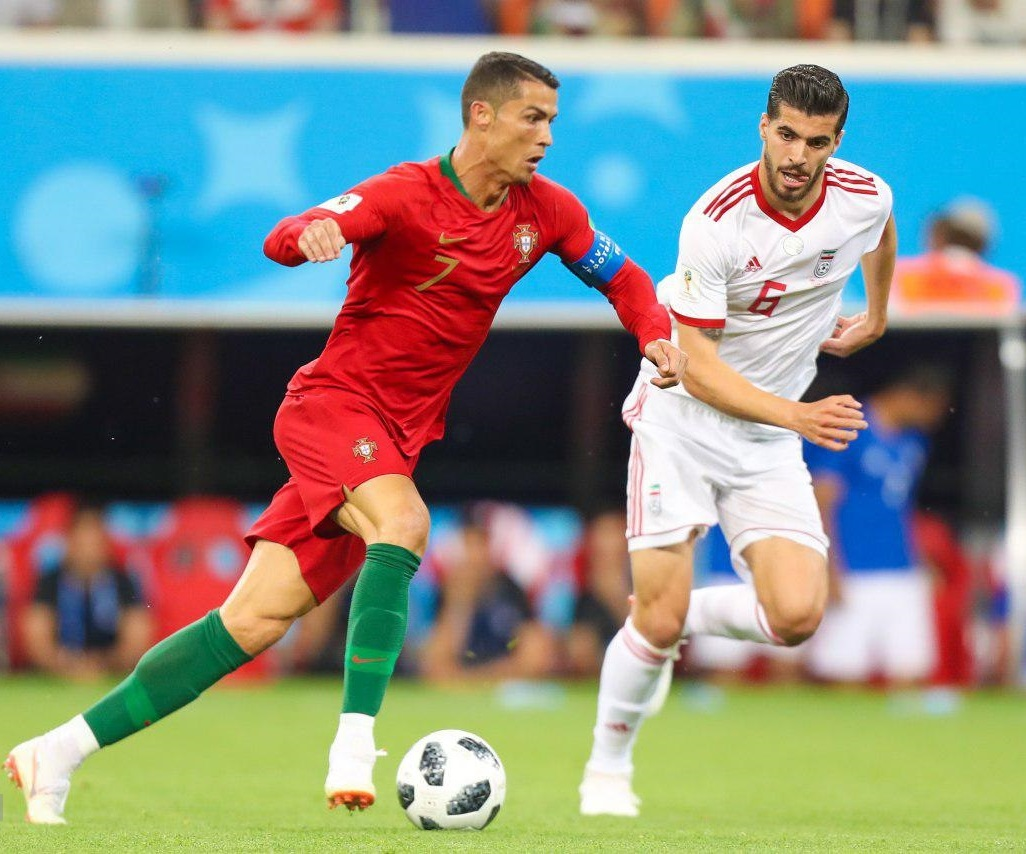
Iran v Portugal

Pos	Team	Pld	W	D	L	GF	GA	GD	Pts	Qualification
1	Spain	3	1	2	0	6	5	+1	5	Advance to knockout stage
2	Portugal	3	1	2	0	5	4	+1	5	Advance to knockout stage
3	Iran	3	1	1	1	2	2	0	4	
4	Morocco	3	0	1	2	2	4	−2	1	

Source: FIFA

15 June 2018
Morocco	0–1	Iran	Krestovsky Stadium, Saint Petersburg
Portugal	3–3	Spain	Fisht Olympic Stadium, Sochi
20 June 2018
Portugal	1–0	Morocco	Luzhniki Stadium, Moscow
Iran	0–1	Spain	Kazan Arena, Kazan
25 June 2018
Iran	1–1	Portugal	Mordovia Arena, Saransk
Spain	2–2	Morocco	Kaliningrad Stadium, Kaliningrad

=== Group C ===
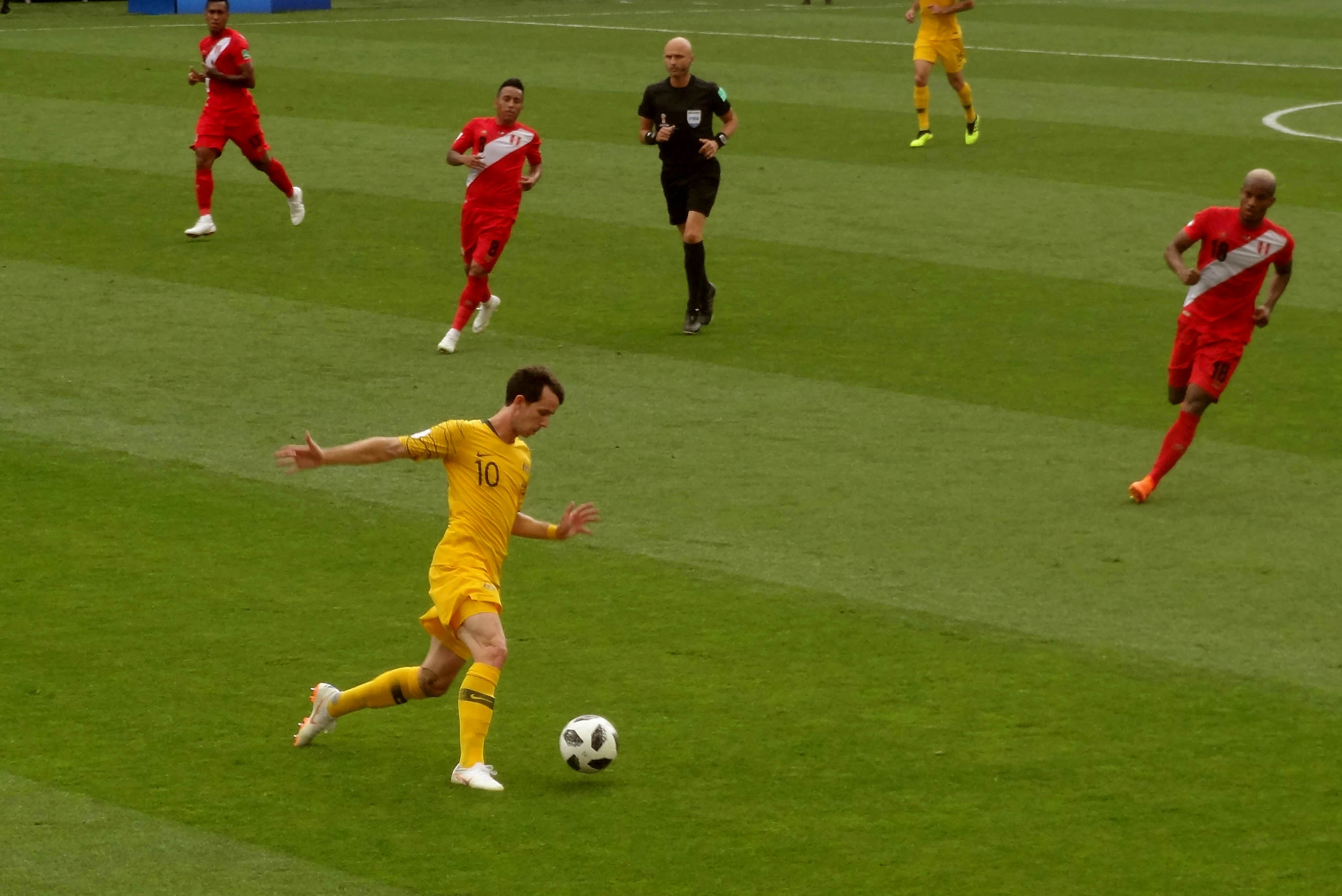
Australia v Peru

Pos	Team	Pld	W	D	L	GF	GA	GD	Pts	Qualification
1	France	3	2	1	0	3	1	+2	7	Advance to knockout stage
2	Denmark	3	1	2	0	2	1	+1	5	Advance to knockout stage
3	Peru	3	1	0	2	2	2	0	3	
4	Australia	3	0	1	2	2	5	−3	1	

Source: FIFA

16 June 2018
France	2–1	Australia	Kazan Arena, Kazan
Peru	0–1	Denmark	Mordovia Arena, Saransk
21 June 2018
Denmark	1–1	Australia	Cosmos Arena, Samara
France	1–0	Peru	Central Stadium, Yekaterinburg
26 June 2018
Denmark	0–0	France	Luzhniki Stadium, Moscow
Australia	0–2	Peru	Fisht Olympic Stadium, Sochi

=== Group D ===
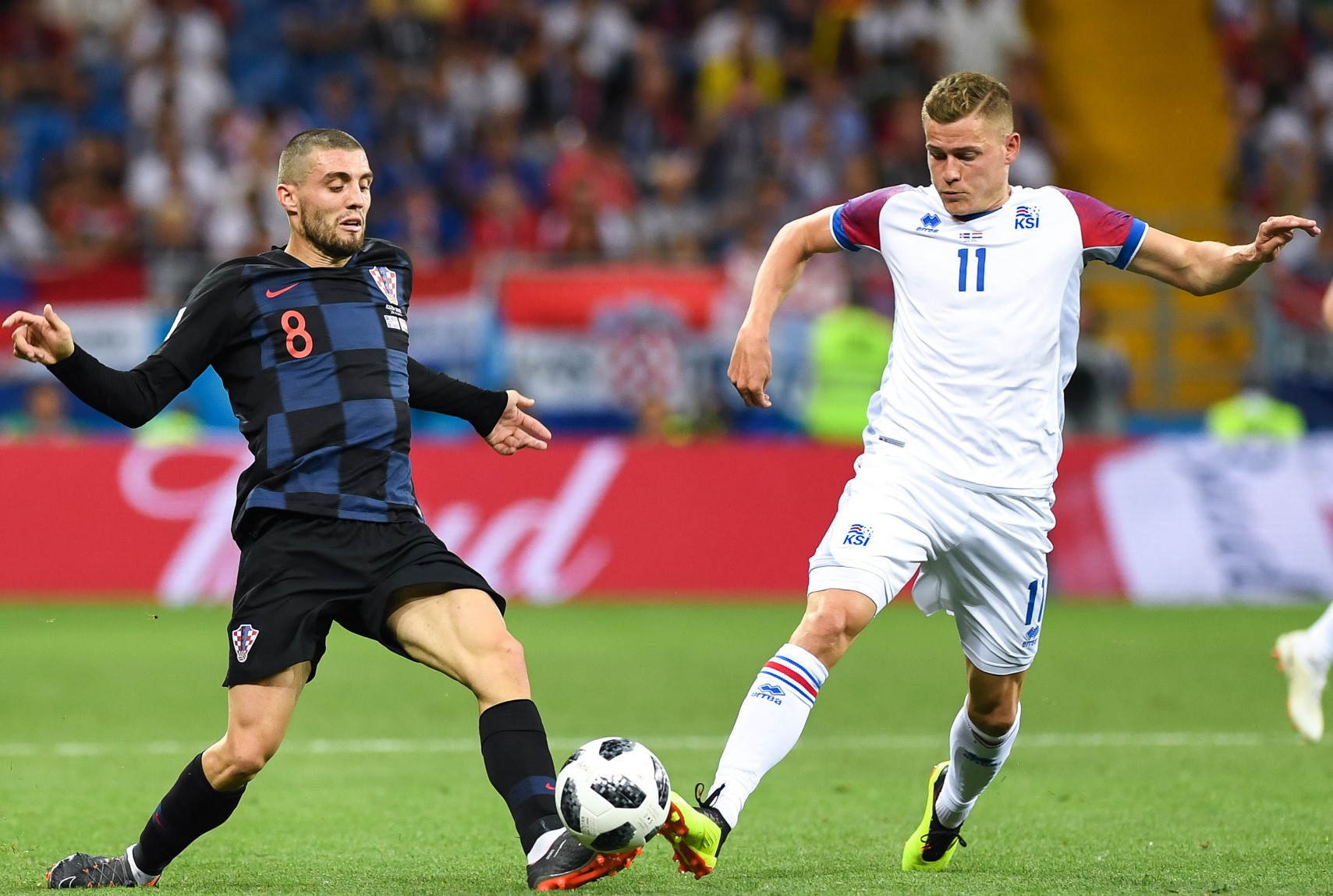
Iceland v Croatia

Pos	Team	Pld	W	D	L	GF	GA	GD	Pts	Qualification
1	Croatia	3	3	0	0	7	1	+6	9	Advance to knockout stage
2	Argentina	3	1	1	1	3	5	−2	4	Advance to knockout stage
3	Nigeria	3	1	0	2	3	4	−1	3	
4	Iceland	3	0	1	2	2	5	−3	1	

Source: FIFA

16 June 2018
Argentina	1–1	Iceland	Otkritie Arena, Moscow
Croatia	2–0	Nigeria	Kaliningrad Stadium, Kaliningrad
21 June 2018
Argentina	0–3	Croatia	Nizhny Novgorod Stadium, Nizhny Novgorod
22 June 2018
Nigeria	2–0	Iceland	Volgograd Arena, Volgograd
26 June 2018
Nigeria	1–2	Argentina	Krestovsky Stadium, Saint Petersburg
Iceland	1–2	Croatia	Rostov Arena, Rostov-on-Don

=== Group E ===
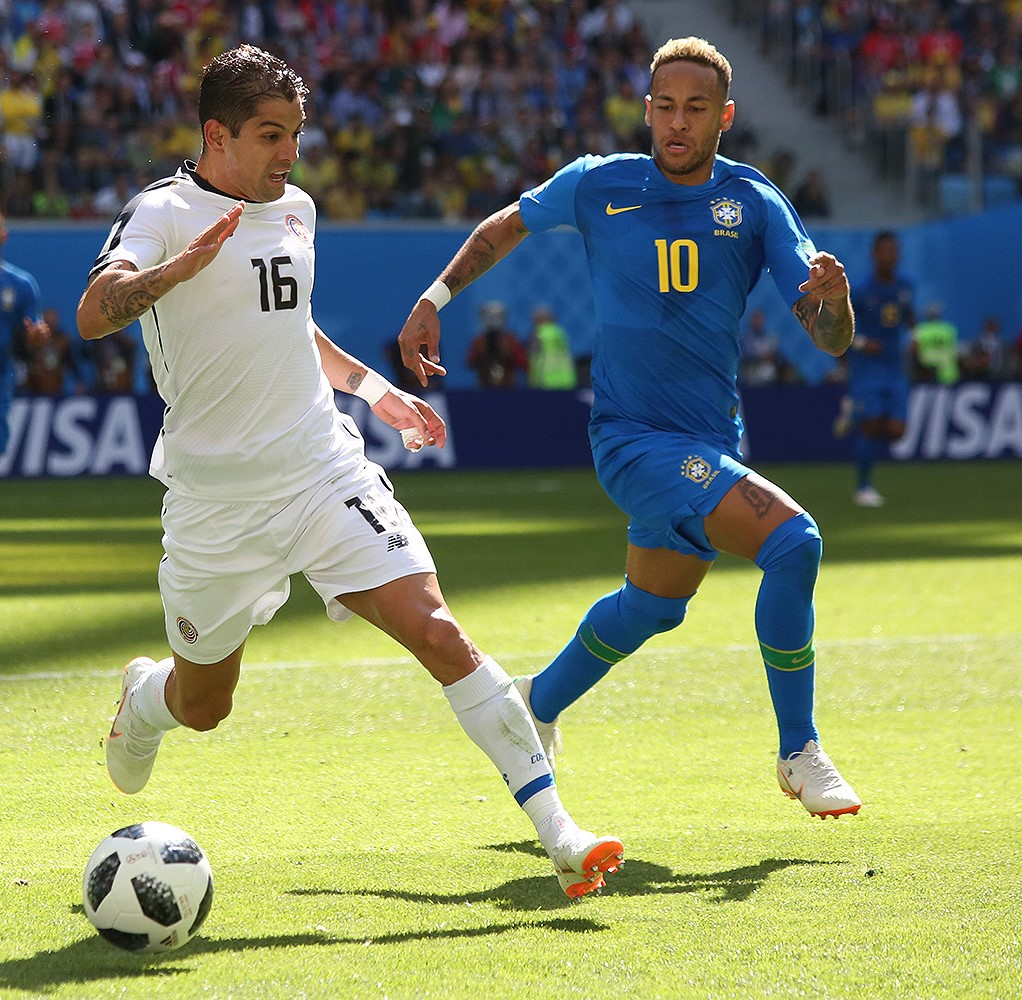
Brazil v Costa Rica

Pos	Team	Pld	W	D	L	GF	GA	GD	Pts	Qualification
1	Brazil	3	2	1	0	5	1	+4	7	Advance to knockout stage
2	Switzerland	3	1	2	0	5	4	+1	5	Advance to knockout stage
3	Serbia	3	1	0	2	2	4	−2	3	
4	Costa Rica	3	0	1	2	2	5	−3	1	

Source: FIFA

17 June 2018
Costa Rica	0–1	Serbia	Cosmos Arena, Samara
Brazil	1–1	Switzerland	Rostov Arena, Rostov-on-Don
22 June 2018
Brazil	2–0	Costa Rica	Krestovsky Stadium, Saint Petersburg
Serbia	1–2	Switzerland	Kaliningrad Stadium, Kaliningrad
27 June 2018
Serbia	0–2	Brazil	Otkritie Arena, Moscow
Switzerland	2–2	Costa Rica	Nizhny Novgorod Stadium, Nizhny Novgorod

=== Group F ===
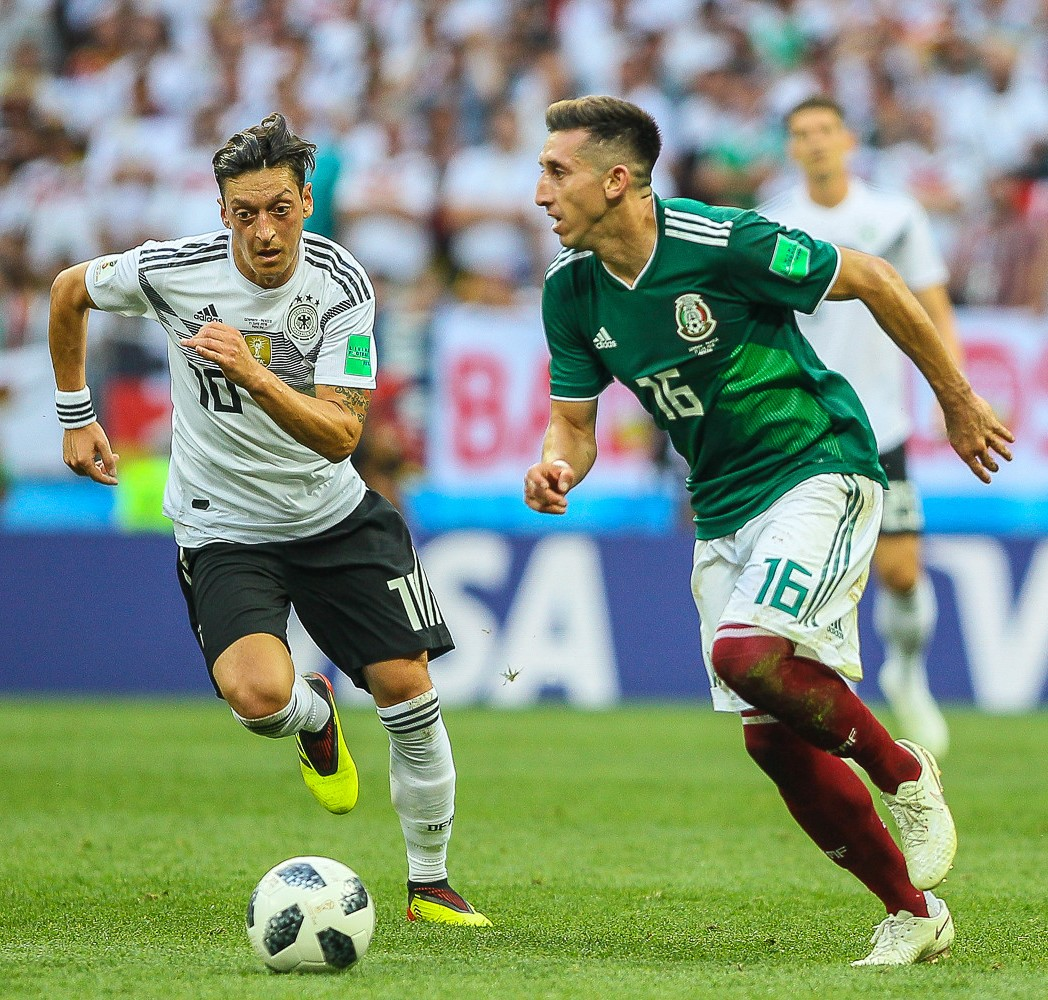
Germany v Mexico

Pos	Team	Pld	W	D	L	GF	GA	GD	Pts	Qualification
1	Sweden	3	2	0	1	5	2	+3	6	Advance to knockout stage
2	Mexico	3	2	0	1	3	4	−1	6	Advance to knockout stage
3	South Korea	3	1	0	2	3	3	0	3	
4	Germany	3	1	0	2	2	4	−2	3	

Source: FIFA

17 June 2018
Germany	0–1	Mexico	Luzhniki Stadium, Moscow
18 June 2018
Sweden	1–0	South Korea	Nizhny Novgorod Stadium, Nizhny Novgorod
23 June 2018
South Korea	1–2	Mexico	Rostov Arena, Rostov-on-Don
Germany	2–1	Sweden	Fisht Olympic Stadium, Sochi
27 June 2018
South Korea	2–0	Germany	Kazan Arena, Kazan
Mexico	0–3	Sweden	Central Stadium, Yekaterinburg

=== Group G ===
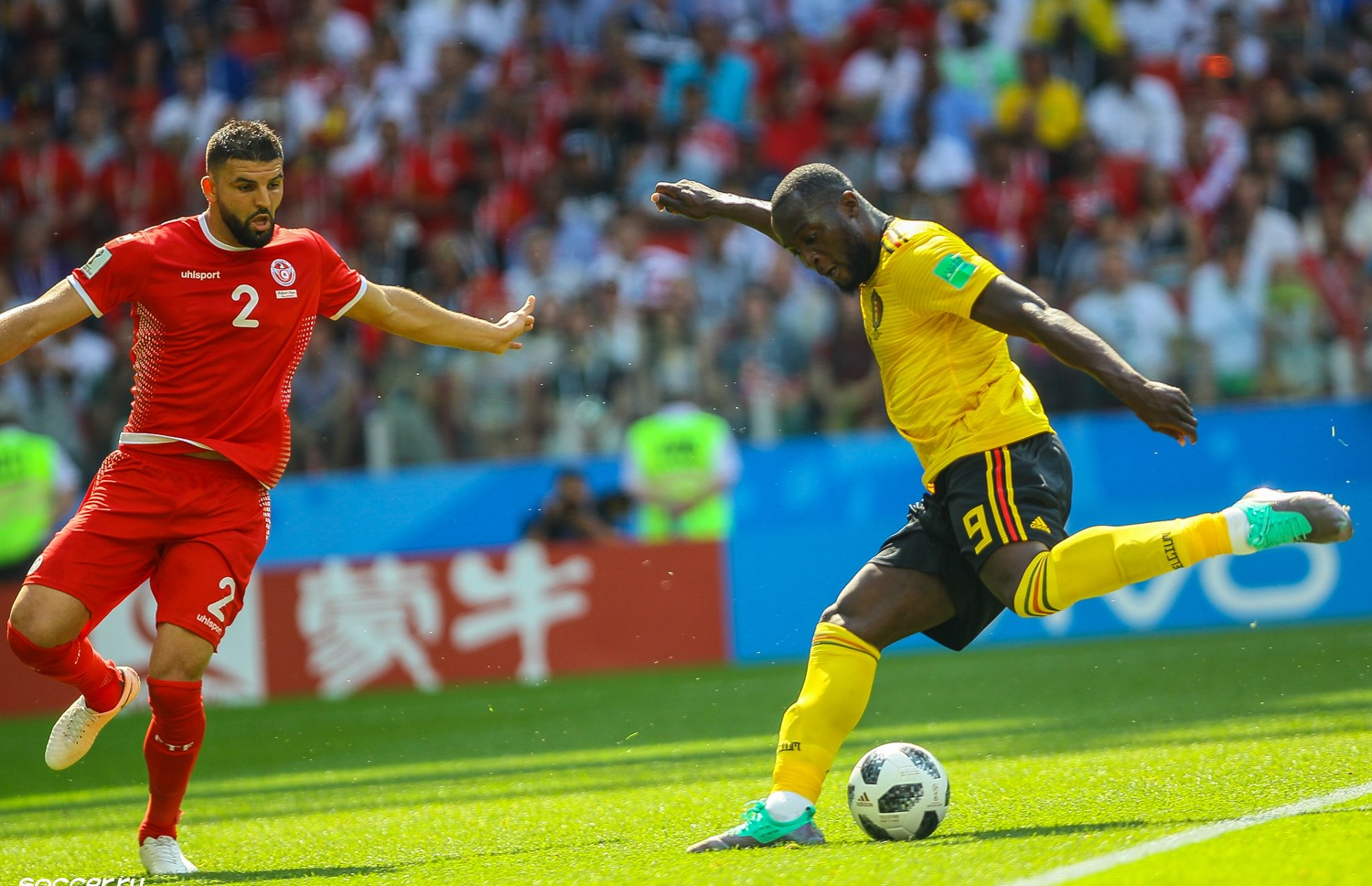
Belgium v Tunisia

Pos	Team	Pld	W	D	L	GF	GA	GD	Pts	Qualification
1	Belgium	3	3	0	0	9	2	+7	9	Advance to knockout stage
2	England	3	2	0	1	8	3	+5	6	Advance to knockout stage
3	Tunisia	3	1	0	2	5	8	−3	3	
4	Panama	3	0	0	3	2	11	−9	0	

Source: FIFA

18 June 2018
Belgium	3–0	Panama	Fisht Olympic Stadium, Sochi
Tunisia	1–2	England	Volgograd Arena, Volgograd
23 June 2018
Belgium	5–2	Tunisia	Otkritie Arena, Moscow
24 June 2018
England	6–1	Panama	Nizhny Novgorod Stadium, Nizhny Novgorod
28 June 2018
England	0–1	Belgium	Kaliningrad Stadium, Kaliningrad
Panama	1–2	Tunisia	Mordovia Arena, Saransk

=== Group H ===
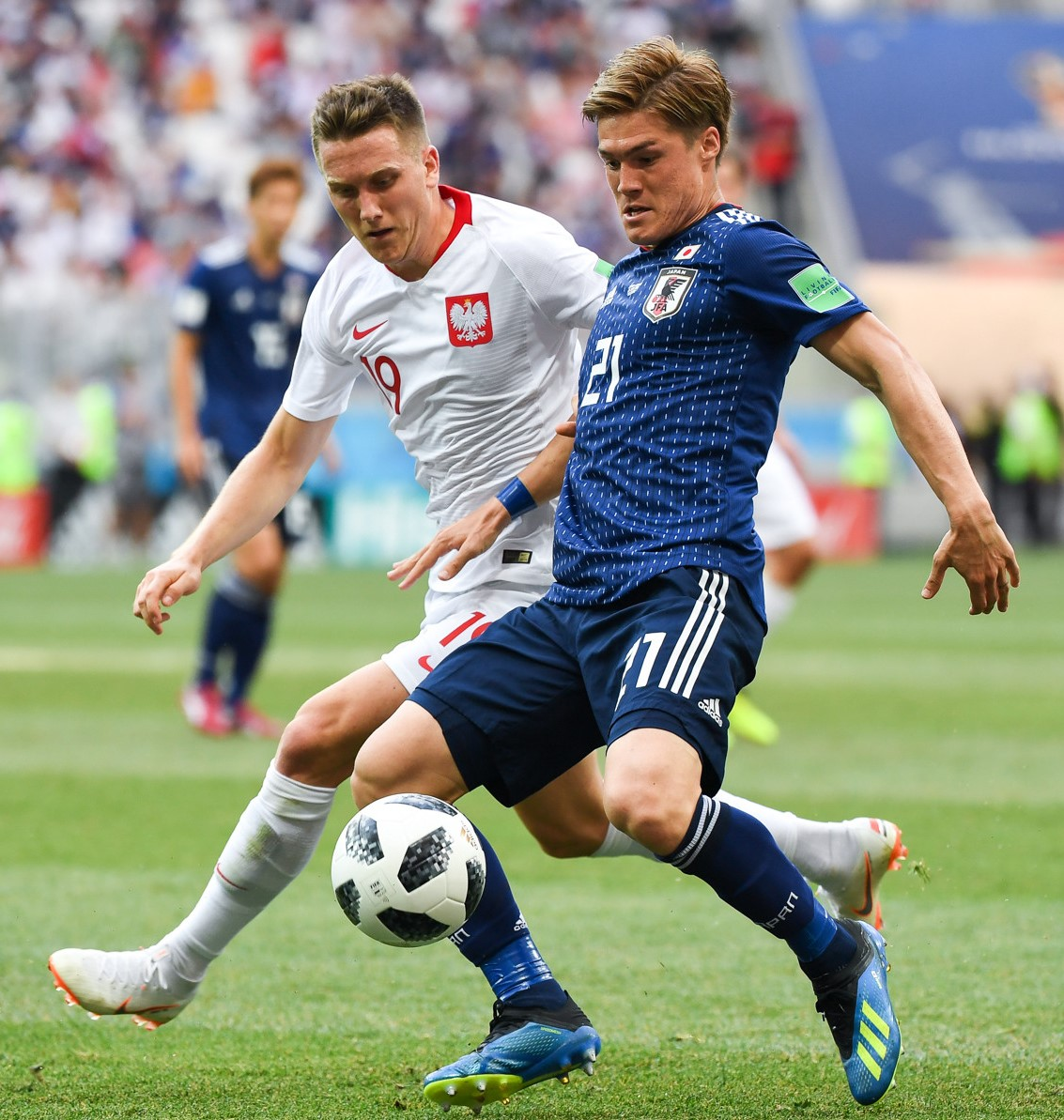
Japan v Poland

Pos	Team	Pld	W	D	L	GF	GA	GD	Pts	Qualification
1	Colombia	3	2	0	1	5	2	+3	6	Advance to knockout stage
2	Japan	3	1	1	1	4	4	0	4 (Note: Fair play points: Japan −4, Senegal −6.)	Advance to knockout stage
3	Senegal	3	1	1	1	4	4	0	4	
4	Poland	3	1	0	2	2	5	−3	3	

Source: FIFA
Notes:

19 June 2018
Colombia	1–2	Japan	Mordovia Arena, Saransk
Poland	1–2	Senegal	Otkritie Arena, Moscow
24 June 2018
Japan	2–2	Senegal	Central Stadium, Yekaterinburg
Poland	0–3	Colombia	Kazan Arena, Kazan
28 June 2018
Japan	0–1	Poland	Volgograd Arena, Volgograd
Senegal	0–1	Colombia	Cosmos Arena, Samara

== Knockout stage ==
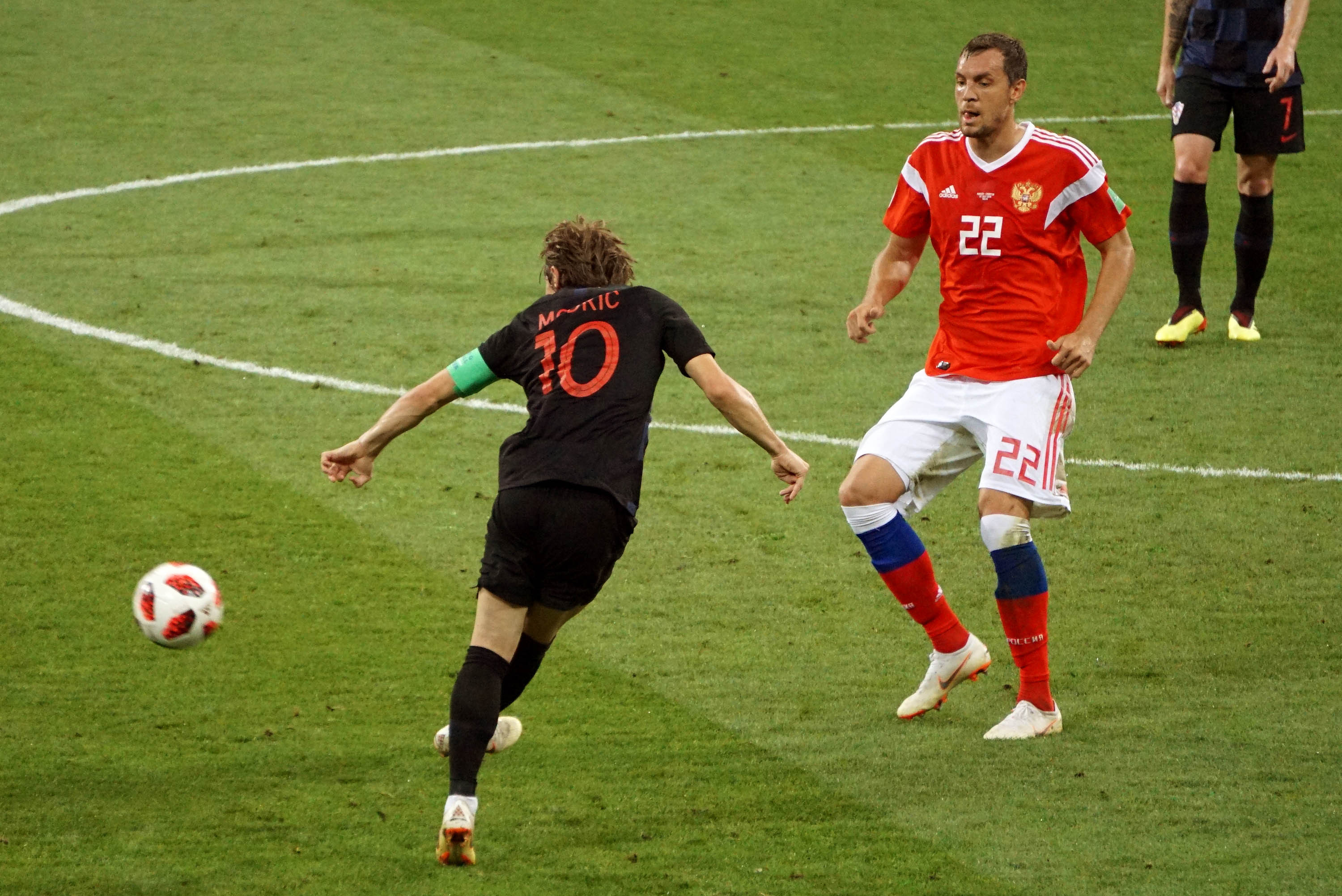
Russia v Croatia

In the knockout stages, if a match was level at the end of normal playing time, extra time was played (two periods of 15 minutes each) and followed, if necessary, by a penalty shoot-out to determine the winners. If a match went into extra time, each team was allowed to make a fourth substitution, the first time this had been allowed in a FIFA World Cup tournament. Below is the bracket for the knockout round of the tournament, teams in bold denote match winners.

=== Bracket ===
Round of 16
30 June – Sochi
**Uruguay**	**2**
Portugal	1
30 June – Kazan
**France**	**4**
Argentina	3
2 July – Samara
**Brazil**	**2**
Mexico	0
2 July – Rostov-on-Don
**Belgium**	**3**
Japan	2
1 July – Moscow (Luzhniki)
Spain	1 (3)
**Russia (p)**	**1 (4)**
1 July – Nizhny Novgorod
**Croatia (p)**	**1 (3)**
Denmark	1 (2)
3 July – Saint Petersburg
**Sweden**	**1**
Switzerland	0
3 July – Moscow (Otkritie)
Colombia	1 (3)
**England (p)**	**1 (4)**

Quarter-finals
6 July – Nizhny Novgorod
Uruguay	0
**France**	**2**
6 July – Kazan
Brazil	1
**Belgium**	**2**
7 July – Sochi
Russia	2 (3)
**Croatia (p)**	**2 (4)**
7 July – Samara
Sweden	0
**England**	**2**

Semi-finals
10 July – Saint Petersburg
**France**	**1**
Belgium	0
11 July – Moscow (Luzhniki)
**Croatia (a.e.t.)**	**2**
England	1

Final
15 July – Moscow (Luzhniki)
**France**	**4**
Croatia	2
Match for third place
14 July – Saint Petersburg
**Belgium**	**2**
England	0

=== Round of 16 ===
30 June 2018
17:00 MSK (UTC+3)

France	4–3	Argentina
Griezmann 13' (pen.); Pavard 57'; Mbappé 64', 68'		Di María 41'; Mercado 48'; Agüero 90+3'

Kazan Arena, Kazan
Attendance: 42,873
Referee: Alireza Faghani (Iran)

30 June 2018
21:00 MSK (UTC+3)

Uruguay	2–1	Portugal
Cavani 7', 62'		Pepe 55'

Fisht Olympic Stadium, Sochi
Attendance: 44,287
Referee: César Arturo Ramos (Mexico)

1 July 2018
17:00 MSK (UTC+3)

Spain	1–1 (a.e.t.)	Russia
Ignashevich 12' (o.g.)		Dzyuba 41' (pen.)
Penalties
Iniesta (penalty scored); Piqué (penalty scored); Koke (penalty missed); Ramos (penalty scored); Aspas (penalty missed)	3–4	(penalty scored) Smolov; (penalty scored) Ignashevich; (penalty scored) Golovin; (penalty scored) Cheryshev

Luzhniki Stadium, Moscow
Attendance: 78,011
Referee: Björn Kuipers (Netherlands)

1 July 2018
21:00 MSK (UTC+3)

Croatia	1–1 (a.e.t.)	Denmark
Mandžukić 4'		M. Jørgensen 1'
Penalties
Badelj (penalty missed); Kramarić (penalty scored); Modrić (penalty scored); Pivarić (penalty missed); Rakitić (penalty scored)	3–2	(penalty missed) Eriksen; (penalty scored) Kjær; (penalty scored) Krohn-Dehli; (penalty missed) Schöne; (penalty missed) N. Jørgensen

Nizhny Novgorod Stadium, Nizhny Novgorod
Attendance: 40,851
Referee: Néstor Pitana (Argentina)

2 July 2018
18:00 SAMT (UTC+4)

Brazil	2–0	Mexico
Neymar 51'; Firmino 88'

Cosmos Arena, Samara
Attendance: 41,970
Referee: Gianluca Rocchi (Italy)

2 July 2018
21:00 MSK (UTC+3)

Belgium	3–2	Japan
Vertonghen 69'; Fellaini 74'; Chadli 90+4'		Haraguchi 48'; Inui 52'

Rostov Arena, Rostov-on-Don
Attendance: 41,466
Referee: Malang Diedhiou (Senegal)

3 July 2018
17:00 MSK (UTC+3)

Sweden	1–0	Switzerland
Forsberg 66'

Krestovsky Stadium, Saint Petersburg
Attendance: 64,042
Referee: Damir Skomina (Slovenia)

3 July 2018
21:00 MSK (UTC+3)

Colombia	1–1 (a.e.t.)	England
Mina 90+3'		Kane 57' (pen.)
Penalties
Falcao (penalty scored); Ju. Cuadrado (penalty scored); Muriel (penalty scored); Uribe (penalty missed); Bacca (penalty missed)	3–4	(penalty scored) Kane; (penalty scored) Rashford; (penalty missed) Henderson; (penalty scored) Trippier; (penalty scored) Dier

Otkritie Arena, Moscow
Attendance: 44,190
Referee: Mark Geiger (United States)

=== Quarter-finals ===
6 July 2018
17:00 MSK (UTC+3)

Uruguay	0–2	France
		Varane 40'; Griezmann 61'

Nizhny Novgorod Stadium, Nizhny Novgorod
Attendance: 43,319
Referee: Néstor Pitana (Argentina)

6 July 2018
21:00 MSK (UTC+3)

Brazil	1–2	Belgium
Renato Augusto 76'		Fernandinho 13' (o.g.); De Bruyne 31'

Kazan Arena, Kazan
Attendance: 42,873
Referee: Milorad Mažić (Serbia)

7 July 2018
18:00 SAMT (UTC+4)

Sweden	0–2	England
		Maguire 30'; Alli 59'

Cosmos Arena, Samara
Attendance: 39,991
Referee: Björn Kuipers (Netherlands)

7 July 2018
21:00 MSK (UTC+3)

Russia	2–2 (a.e.t.)	Croatia
Cheryshev 31'; Fernandes 115'		Kramarić 39'; Vida 101'
Penalties
Smolov (penalty missed); Dzagoev (penalty scored); Fernandes (penalty missed); Ignashevich (penalty scored); Kuzyayev (penalty scored)	3–4	(penalty scored) Brozović; (penalty missed) Kovačić; (penalty scored) Modrić; (penalty scored) Vida; (penalty scored) Rakitić

Fisht Olympic Stadium, Sochi
Attendance: 44,287
Referee: Sandro Ricci (Brazil)

=== Semi-finals ===
10 July 2018
21:00 MSK (UTC+3)

France	1–0	Belgium
Umtiti 51'

Krestovsky Stadium, Saint Petersburg
Attendance: 64,286
Referee: Andrés Cunha (Uruguay)

11 July 2018
21:00 MSK (UTC+3)

Croatia	2–1 (a.e.t.)	England
Perišić 68'; Mandžukić 109'		Trippier 5'

Luzhniki Stadium, Moscow
Attendance: 78,011
Referee: Cüneyt Çakır (Turkey)

=== Match for third place ===
14 July 2018
17:00 MSK (UTC+3)

Belgium	2–0	England
Meunier 4'; E. Hazard 82'

Krestovsky Stadium, Saint Petersburg
Attendance: 64,406
Referee: Alireza Faghani (Iran)

=== Final ===
15 July 2018
18:00 MSK (UTC+3)

France	4–2	Croatia
Mandžukić 18' (o.g.); Griezmann 38' (pen.); Pogba 59'; Mbappé 65'		Perišić 28'; Mandžukić 69'

Luzhniki Stadium, Moscow
Attendance: 78,011
Referee: Néstor Pitana (Argentina)

== Statistics ==
=== Goalscorers ===
There were 169 goals scored in 64 matches, for an average of 2.64 goals per match.

Twelve own goals were scored during the tournament, doubling the record of six set in 1998. Goals scored from penalty shoot-outs are not counted towards an individual player's goal count.

6 goals

- (England) Harry Kane

4 goals

- (Belgium) Romelu Lukaku
- (France) Antoine Griezmann
- (France) Kylian Mbappé
- (Portugal) Cristiano Ronaldo
- (Russia) Denis Cheryshev

3 goals

- (Belgium) Eden Hazard
- (Colombia) Yerry Mina
- (Croatia) Mario Mandžukić
- (Croatia) Ivan Perišić
- (Russia) Artem Dzyuba
- (Spain) Diego Costa
- (Uruguay) Edinson Cavani

2 goals

- (Argentina) Sergio Agüero
- (Australia) Mile Jedinak
- (Brazil) Philippe Coutinho
- (Brazil) Neymar
- (Croatia) Luka Modrić
- (Egypt) Mohamed Salah
- (England) John Stones
- (Japan) Takashi Inui
- (Nigeria) Ahmed Musa
- (South Korea) Son Heung-min
- (Sweden) Andreas Granqvist
- (Tunisia) Wahbi Khazri
- (Uruguay) Luis Suárez

1 goal

- (Argentina) Ángel Di María
- (Argentina) Gabriel Mercado
- (Argentina) Lionel Messi
- (Argentina) Marcos Rojo
- (Belgium) Michy Batshuayi
- (Belgium) Nacer Chadli
- (Belgium) Kevin De Bruyne
- (Belgium) Marouane Fellaini
- (Belgium) Adnan Januzaj
- (Belgium) Dries Mertens
- (Belgium) Thomas Meunier
- (Belgium) Jan Vertonghen
- (Brazil) Roberto Firmino
- (Brazil) Paulinho
- (Brazil) Renato Augusto
- (Brazil) Thiago Silva
- (Colombia) Juan Cuadrado
- (Colombia) Radamel Falcao
- (Colombia) Juan Fernando Quintero
- (Costa Rica) Kendall Waston
- (Croatia) Milan Badelj
- (Croatia) Andrej Kramarić
- (Croatia) Ivan Rakitić
- (Croatia) Ante Rebić
- (Croatia) Domagoj Vida
- (Denmark) Christian Eriksen
- (Denmark) Mathias Jørgensen
- (Denmark) Yussuf Poulsen
- (England) Dele Alli
- (England) Jesse Lingard
- (England) Harry Maguire
- (England) Kieran Trippier
- (France) Benjamin Pavard
- (France) Paul Pogba
- (France) Samuel Umtiti
- (France) Raphaël Varane
- (Germany) Toni Kroos
- (Germany) Marco Reus
- (Iceland) Alfreð Finnbogason
- (Iceland) Gylfi Sigurðsson
- (Iran) Karim Ansarifard
- (Japan) Genki Haraguchi
- (Japan) Keisuke Honda
- (Japan) Shinji Kagawa
- (Japan) Yuya Osako
- (Mexico) Javier Hernández
- (Mexico) Hirving Lozano
- (Mexico) Carlos Vela
- (Morocco) Khalid Boutaïb
- (Morocco) Youssef En-Nesyri
- (Nigeria) Victor Moses
- (Panama) Felipe Baloy
- (Peru) André Carrillo
- (Peru) Paolo Guerrero
- (Poland) Jan Bednarek
- (Poland) Grzegorz Krychowiak
- (Portugal) Pepe
- (Portugal) Ricardo Quaresma
- (Russia) Mário Fernandes
- (Russia) Yury Gazinsky
- (Russia) Aleksandr Golovin
- (Saudi Arabia) Salem Al-Dawsari
- (Saudi Arabia) Salman Al-Faraj
- (Senegal) Sadio Mané
- (Senegal) M'Baye Niang
- (Senegal) Moussa Wagué
- (Serbia) Aleksandar Kolarov
- (Serbia) Aleksandar Mitrović
- (South Korea) Kim Young-gwon
- (Spain) Iago Aspas
- (Spain) Isco
- (Spain) Nacho
- (Sweden) Ludwig Augustinsson
- (Sweden) Emil Forsberg
- (Sweden) Ola Toivonen
- (Switzerland) Josip Drmić
- (Switzerland) Blerim Džemaili
- (Switzerland) Xherdan Shaqiri
- (Switzerland) Granit Xhaka
- (Switzerland) Steven Zuber
- (Tunisia) Dylan Bronn
- (Tunisia) Ferjani Sassi
- (Tunisia) Fakhreddine Ben Youssef
- (Uruguay) José Giménez

1 own goal

- (Australia) Aziz Behich (against France)
- (Brazil) Fernandinho (against Belgium)
- (Croatia) Mario Mandžukić (against France)
- (Egypt) Ahmed Fathy (against Russia)
- (Mexico) Edson Álvarez (against Sweden)
- (Morocco) Aziz Bouhaddouz (against Iran)
- (Nigeria) Peter Etebo (against Croatia)
- (Poland) Thiago Cionek (against Senegal)
- (Russia) Denis Cheryshev (against Uruguay)
- (Russia) Sergei Ignashevich (against Spain)
- (Switzerland) Yann Sommer (against Costa Rica)
- (Tunisia) Yassine Meriah (against Panama)

Source: FIFA

=== Hat tricks ===
Player	Number and time of goals	For	Goals	Result	Against	Round	Date
Cristiano Ronaldo	3 – 4', 44', 88'	Portugal	1–0, 2–1, 3–3	3–3	Spain	Group stage	15 June 2018
Harry Kane	3 – 22', 45+1', 62'	England	2–0, 5–0, 6–0	6–1	Panama	Group stage	24 June 2018

=== Discipline ===
In total, only four players were sent off in the entire tournament, the fewest since 1978. International Football Association Board technical director David Elleray stated a belief that this was due to the introduction of VAR, since players would know that they would not be able to get away with anything under the new system.

A player was automatically suspended for the next match for the following offences:

- Receiving a red card (red card suspensions could be extended for serious offences)
- Receiving two yellow cards in two matches; yellow cards expired after the completion of the quarter-finals (yellow card suspensions were not carried forward to any other future international matches)

The following suspensions were served during the tournament:

Player	Offence(s)	Suspension(s)
(Colombia) Carlos Sánchez	(red card) in Group H vs Japan (matchday 1; 19 June)	Group H vs Poland (matchday 2; 24 June)
(Denmark) Yussuf Poulsen	(yellow card) in Group C vs Peru (matchday 1; 16 June); (yellow card) in Group C vs Australia (matchday 2; 21 June)	Group C vs France (matchday 3; 26 June)
(Germany) Jérôme Boateng	(yellow card) (yellow-red card) in Group F vs Sweden (matchday 2; 23 June)	Group F vs South Korea (matchday 3; 27 June)
(Panama) Armando Cooper	(yellow card) in Group G vs Belgium (matchday 1; 18 June); (yellow card) in Group G vs England (matchday 2; 24 June)	Group G vs Tunisia (matchday 3; 28 June)
(Panama) Michael Amir Murillo	(yellow card) in Group G vs Belgium (matchday 1; 18 June); (yellow card) in Group G vs England (matchday 2; 24 June)	Group G vs Tunisia (matchday 3; 28 June)
(Russia) Igor Smolnikov	(yellow card) (yellow-red card) in Group A vs Uruguay (matchday 3; 25 June)	Round of 16 vs Spain (1 July)
(Sweden) Sebastian Larsson	(yellow card) in Group F vs Germany (matchday 2; 23 June); (yellow card) in Group F vs Mexico (matchday 3; 27 June)	Round of 16 vs Switzerland (3 July)
(Mexico) Héctor Moreno	(yellow card) in Group F vs Germany (matchday 1; 17 June); (yellow card) in Group F vs Sweden (matchday 3; 27 June)	Round of 16 vs Brazil (2 July)
(Switzerland) Stephan Lichtsteiner	(yellow card) in Group E vs Brazil (matchday 1; 17 June); (yellow card) in Group E vs Costa Rica (matchday 3; 27 June)	Round of 16 vs Sweden (3 July)
(Switzerland) Fabian Schär	(yellow card) in Group E vs Brazil (matchday 1; 17 June); (yellow card) in Group E vs Costa Rica (matchday 3; 27 June)	Round of 16 vs Sweden (3 July)
(France) Blaise Matuidi	(yellow card) in Group C vs Peru (matchday 2; 21 June); (yellow card) in Round of 16 vs Argentina (30 June)	Quarter-finals vs Uruguay (6 July)
(Brazil) Casemiro	(yellow card) in Group E vs Switzerland (matchday 1; 17 June); (yellow card) in Round of 16 vs Mexico (2 July)	Quarter-finals vs Belgium (6 July)
(Sweden) Mikael Lustig	(yellow card) in Group F vs Mexico (matchday 3; 27 June); (yellow card) in Round of 16 vs Switzerland (3 July)	Quarter-finals vs England (7 July)
(Switzerland) Michael Lang	(red card) in Round of 16 vs Sweden (3 July)	Suspension served outside tournament
(Belgium) Thomas Meunier	(yellow card) in Group G vs Panama (matchday 1; 18 June); (yellow card) in Quarter-finals vs Brazil (6 July)	Semi-finals vs France (10 July)

=== Tournament ranking ===
Per statistical convention in football, matches decided in extra time are counted as wins and losses, while matches decided by penalty shoot-outs are counted as draws.

Pos	Grp	Team	Pld	W	D	L	GF	GA	GD	Pts	Final result
1	C	France	7	6	1	0	14	6	+8	19	Champions
2	D	Croatia	7	4	2	1	14	9	+5	14	Runners-up
3	G	Belgium	7	6	0	1	16	6	+10	18	Third place
4	G	England	7	3	1	3	12	8	+4	10	Fourth place
5	A	Uruguay	5	4	0	1	7	3	+4	12	Eliminated in quarter-finals
6	E	Brazil	5	3	1	1	8	3	+5	10	Eliminated in quarter-finals
7	F	Sweden	5	3	0	2	6	4	+2	9	Eliminated in quarter-finals
8	A	Russia (H)	5	2	2	1	11	7	+4	8	Eliminated in quarter-finals
9	H	Colombia	4	2	1	1	6	3	+3	7	Eliminated in round of 16
10	B	Spain	4	1	3	0	7	6	+1	6	Eliminated in round of 16
11	C	Denmark	4	1	3	0	3	2	+1	6	Eliminated in round of 16
12	F	Mexico	4	2	0	2	3	6	−3	6	Eliminated in round of 16
13	B	Portugal	4	1	2	1	6	6	0	5	Eliminated in round of 16
14	E	Switzerland	4	1	2	1	5	5	0	5	Eliminated in round of 16
15	H	Japan	4	1	1	2	6	7	−1	4	Eliminated in round of 16
16	D	Argentina	4	1	1	2	6	9	−3	4	Eliminated in round of 16
17	H	Senegal	3	1	1	1	4	4	0	4	Eliminated in group stage
18	B	Iran	3	1	1	1	2	2	0	4	Eliminated in group stage
19	F	South Korea	3	1	0	2	3	3	0	3	Eliminated in group stage
20	C	Peru	3	1	0	2	2	2	0	3	Eliminated in group stage
21	D	Nigeria	3	1	0	2	3	4	−1	3	Eliminated in group stage
=22	F	Germany	3	1	0	2	2	4	−2	3	Eliminated in group stage
=22	E	Serbia	3	1	0	2	2	4	−2	3	Eliminated in group stage
24	G	Tunisia	3	1	0	2	5	8	−3	3	Eliminated in group stage
25	H	Poland	3	1	0	2	2	5	−3	3	Eliminated in group stage
26	A	Saudi Arabia	3	1	0	2	2	7	−5	3	Eliminated in group stage
27	B	Morocco	3	0	1	2	2	4	−2	1	Eliminated in group stage
=28	C	Australia	3	0	1	2	2	5	−3	1	Eliminated in group stage
=28	E	Costa Rica	3	0	1	2	2	5	−3	1	Eliminated in group stage
=28	D	Iceland	3	0	1	2	2	5	−3	1	Eliminated in group stage
31	A	Egypt	3	0	0	3	2	6	−4	0	Eliminated in group stage
32	G	Panama	3	0	0	3	2	11	−9	0	Eliminated in group stage

Source: FIFA
(H) Hosts

== Awards ==
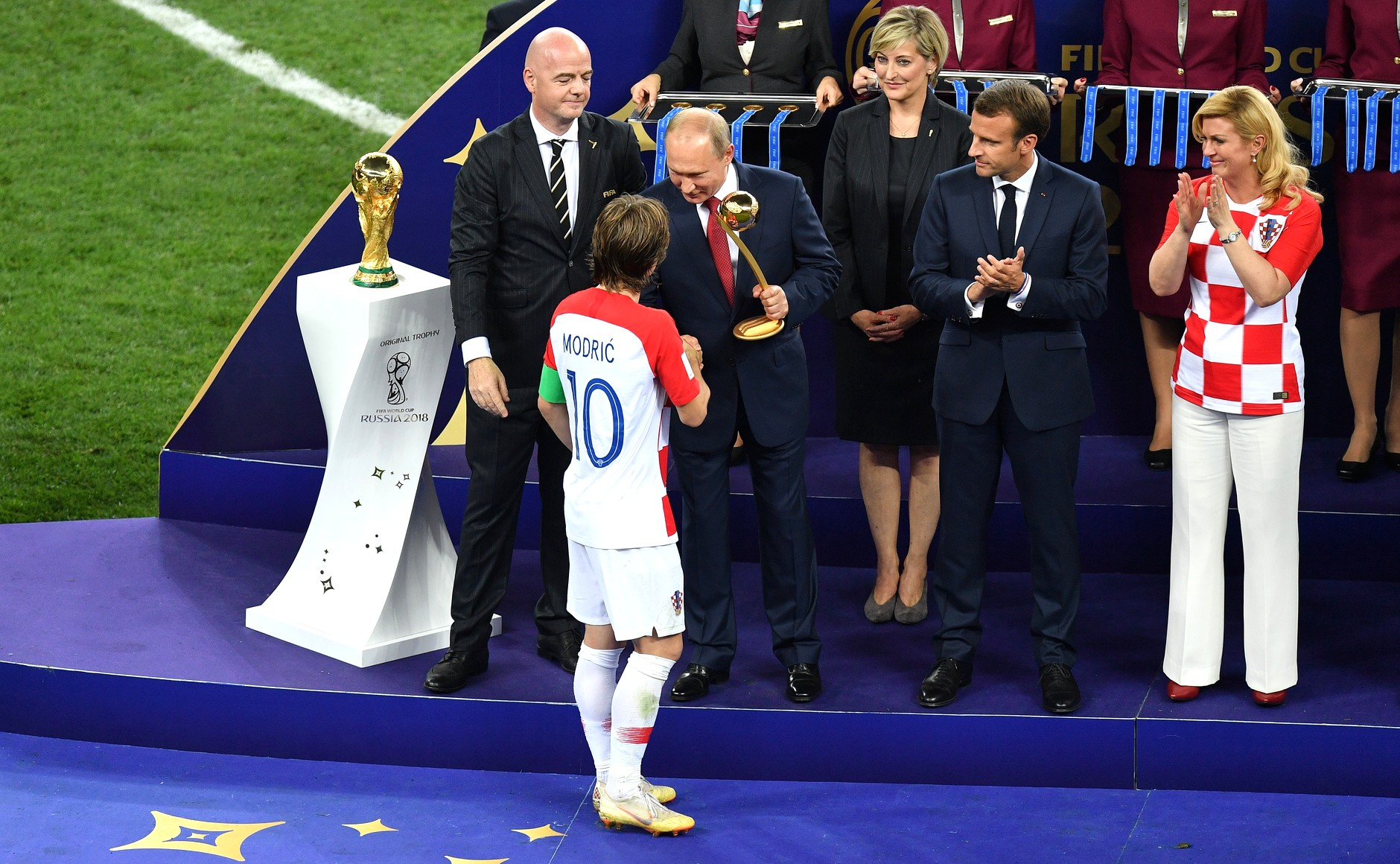
Luka Modrić accepting the Golden Ball award from Vladimir Putin

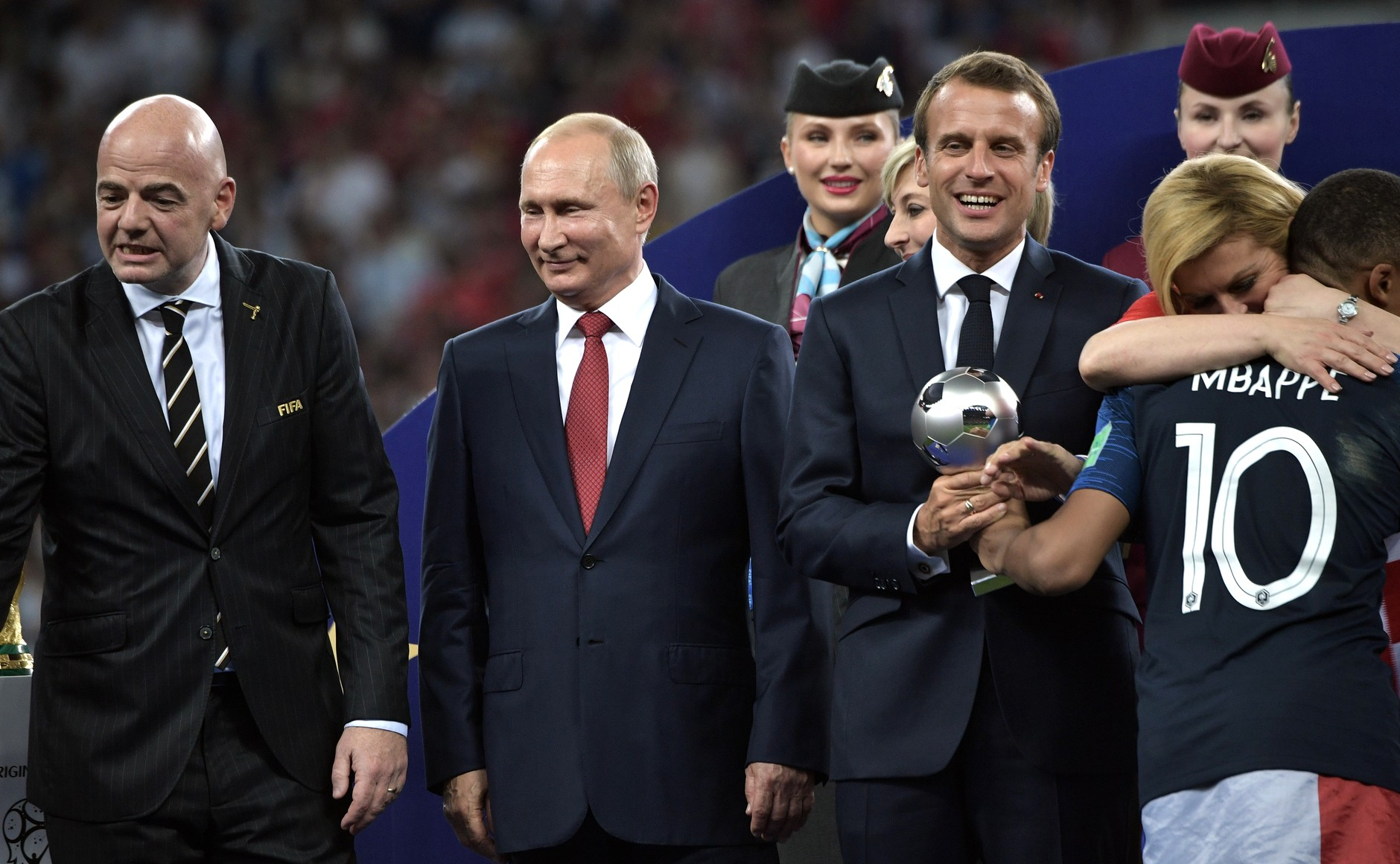
Kylian Mbappé receiving the World Cup best young player award from Emmanuel Macron

The following awards were given at the conclusion of the tournament. The Golden Boot (top scorer), Golden Ball (best overall player) and Golden Glove (best goalkeeper) awards were all sponsored by Adidas.

Golden Ball	Silver Ball	Bronze Ball
(Croatia) Luka Modrić	(Belgium) Eden Hazard	(France) Antoine Griezmann
Golden Boot	Silver Boot	Bronze Boot
(England) Harry Kane (6 goals, 0 assists)	(France) Antoine Griezmann (4 goals, 2 assists)	(Belgium) Romelu Lukaku (4 goals, 1 assist)
Golden Glove
(Belgium) Thibaut Courtois
FIFA Young Player Award
(France) Kylian Mbappé
FIFA Fair Play Trophy
Spain

=== Dream Team ===
The users of FIFA.com elected their Fan Dream Team.

Goalkeeper	Defenders	Midfielders	Forwards
(Belgium) Thibaut Courtois	(Brazil) Marcelo (Brazil) Thiago Silva (France) Raphaël Varane (Uruguay) Diego Godín	(Belgium) Kevin De Bruyne (Brazil) Philippe Coutinho (Croatia) Luka Modrić	(England) Harry Kane (France) Kylian Mbappé (Portugal) Cristiano Ronaldo

Additionally, FIFA.com shortlisted 18 goals for users to vote on as the tournament's best. The poll closed on 23 July. The award was sponsored by Hyundai.

Goal of the Tournament
Goalscorer	Opponent	Score	Round
(France) Benjamin Pavard	Argentina	2–2	Round of 16

=== All-Star Team ===
FIFA published an All-Star Team, this year called the Fantasy Team, based on player performances evaluated through statistical data.

Goalkeeper	Defenders	Midfielders	Forwards
(Belgium) Thibaut Courtois	(Sweden) Andreas Granqvist (Brazil) Thiago Silva (France) Raphaël Varane (Colombia) Yerry Mina	(Russia) Denis Cheryshev (Brazil) Philippe Coutinho (Croatia) Luka Modrić	(England) Harry Kane (France) Antoine Griezmann (Belgium) Eden Hazard

=== Prize money ===
Prize money amounts were announced in October 2017.

Position	Amount (million USD)	
Position	Per team	Total
Champions	38	38
Runners-up	28	28
Third place	24	24
Fourth place	22	22
5th–8th place (quarter-finals)	16	64
9th–16th place (round of 16)	12	96
17th–32nd place (group stage)	8	128
Total		400

== Marketing ==
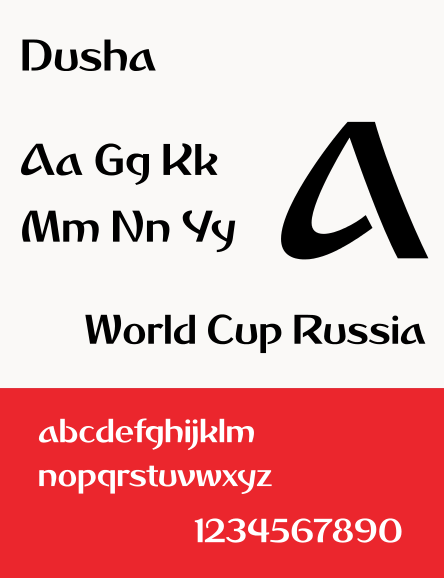
The typeface "Dusha" used for branding

=== Branding ===
The tournament logo was unveiled on 28 October 2014 by cosmonauts at the International Space Station and then projected onto Moscow's Bolshoi Theatre during an evening television programme. Russian Sports Minister Vitaly Mutko said the logo was inspired by "Russia's rich artistic tradition and its history of bold achievement and innovation", and FIFA president Sepp Blatter stated that it reflected the "heart and soul" of the country. For branding, Portuguese design agency Brandia Central created materials in 2014, with a typeface called Dusha – душа (Russian for 'soul') – designed by Brandia Central and edited by Adotbelow of the DSType Foundry in Portugal.

=== Broadcasting rights ===
FIFA, through several companies, sold the broadcasting rights for the 2018 FIFA World Cup to various local broadcasters. After having tested the technology at limited matches of the 2013 FIFA Confederations Cup, and the 2014 FIFA World Cup (via private tests and public viewings in the host city of Rio de Janeiro), the 2018 World Cup was the first World Cup in which all matches were produced in 4K ultra high definition. Host Broadcast Services (HBS) stated that at least 75% of the broadcast cut of each match would come from 4K cameras (covering the majority of main angles), with instant replays and some camera angles being converted up from 1080p high definition sources with limited degradation in quality. These broadcasts were made available from selected rightsholders and television providers.

In February 2018, Ukrainian rightsholder UA:PBC stated that it would not broadcast the World Cup due to existing tensions with Russia amidst the Russo-Ukrainian War. This came in the wake of growing boycott of the tournament by the Ukrainian Association of Football and sports minister Ihor Zhdanov. Additionally, the FFU refused to accredit journalists for the World Cup and waived their quota of tickets. However, the Ukrainian state TV still broadcast the World Cup, and more than 4 million Ukrainians watched the opening match.

Broadcast rights to the tournament in the Middle East were hampered by an ongoing Qatar diplomatic crisis, which saw Bahrain, Egypt, Saudi Arabia, and United Arab Emirates cut diplomatic ties with Qatar—the home country of FIFA's Middle East and Africa rightsholder BeIN Sports—in June 2017, over its alleged state support of terrorist groups. On 2 June 2018, beIN pulled its channels from Du and Etisalat, but with service to the latter restored later that day. Etisalat subsequently announced that it would air the World Cup in the UAE, and continue to offer beIN normally and without interruptions. In Saudi Arabia, beIN was banned from doing business; as a result, its channels and other content have been widely and illegally repackaged by a broadcaster identifying itself as "BeoutQ". While FIFA attempted to negotiate the sale of a package consisting of Saudi matches and the final indirectly, they were unable to do so. On 12 July 2018, FIFA stated that it had "engaged counsel to take legal action in Saudi Arabia and is working alongside other sports rights owners that have also been affected to protect its interests."

In the United States, the 2018 World Cup was the first men's World Cup whose English rights were held by Fox Sports, and Spanish rights held by Telemundo. The elimination of the United States in the qualifiers led to concerns that US interest and viewership of this World Cup would be reduced, noting that "casual" viewers of US matches caused them to peak at 16.5 million in 2014, and determined how much Fox paid for the rights. During a launch event prior to the elimination, Fox stated that it had planned to place a secondary focus on the Mexican team in its coverage to take advantage of their popularity among Hispanic and Latino Americans. Fox stated that it was still committed to broadcasting a significant amount of tournament coverage. Viewership was down overall compared to 2014; match scheduling and time zones were not as favourable to viewers in the Americas as they were in 2014. Many games aired in the morning hours, although Telemundo's broadcast of the Mexico-Sweden Group F match was announced as being its most-watched weekday daytime program in the network's history.

Unlike previous tournaments, where the rights were bundled with those of South Korea, Korean Central Television acquired rights to the 2018 World Cup within North Korea. Broadcasts only began with the round of 16, and matches were tape delayed and edited for time. In addition, matches involving Japan were excluded from the broadcasts, due to strained relations and campaigns against the country.

=== Ticketing ===
The first phase of ticket sales started on 14 September 2017, 12:00 Moscow Time, and lasted until 12 October 2017.

The general visa policy of Russia did not apply to participants and spectators, who were able to visit Russia without a visa right before and during the competition regardless of their citizenship. Spectators were nonetheless required to register for a "Fan-ID", a special photo identification pass. A Fan-ID was required to enter the country visa-free, while a ticket, Fan-ID and a valid passport were required to enter stadiums for matches. Fan-IDs also granted World Cup attendees free access to public transport services, including buses, and train service between host cities. Fan-ID was administered by the Ministry of Digital Development, Communications and Mass Media, which could revoke this accreditation at any time to "ensure the defence capability or security of the state or public order".

=== Merchandise ===
On 29 May 2018, Electronic Arts released a free update to their video game FIFA 18 that added content related to the 2018 FIFA World Cup. The expansion included a World Cup tournament mode with all teams and stadiums from the event, official television presentation elements, and World Cup-related content for the Ultimate Team mode.

Panini Group continued their partnership with FIFA by producing stickers for their World Cup sticker album. Panini also developed an app for the 2018 World Cup where fans could collect and swap virtual stickers, with 5 million fans gathering digital stickers for the tournament.

== Symbols ==
=== Mascot ===
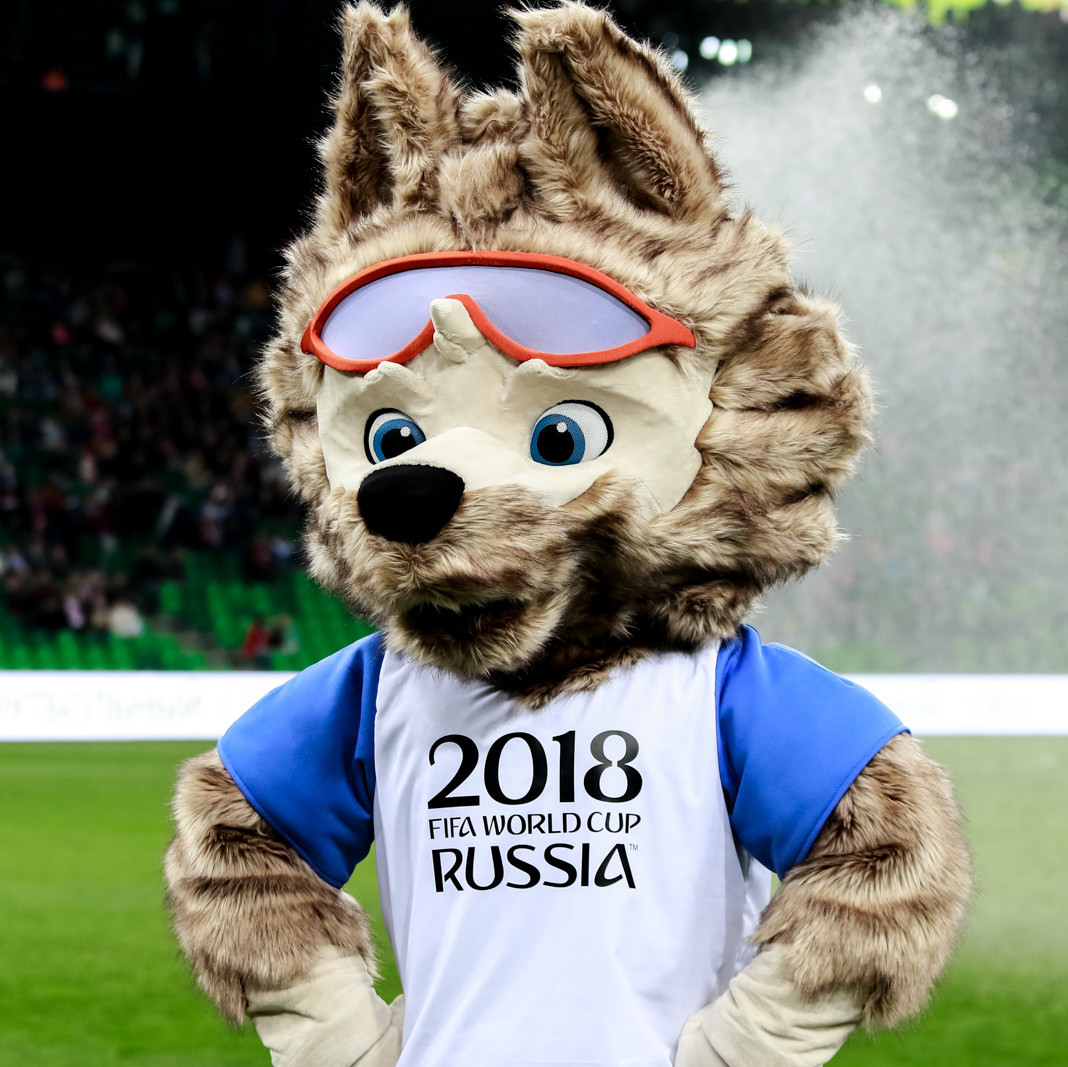
Tournament mascot, wolf Zabivaka

The tournament's official mascot was unveiled on 21 October 2016, and selected through a design competition among university students. A public vote was used to select the mascot from three finalists—a cat, a tiger, and a wolf. The winner, with 53% or approximately 1 million votes, was Zabivaka—an anthropomorphic wolf dressed in the colours of the Russian national team. Zabivaka's name is a portmanteau of the Russian words забияка ("hothead") and забивать ("to score"), and his official backstory states that he is an aspiring football player who is "charming, confident and social".

=== Match ball ===
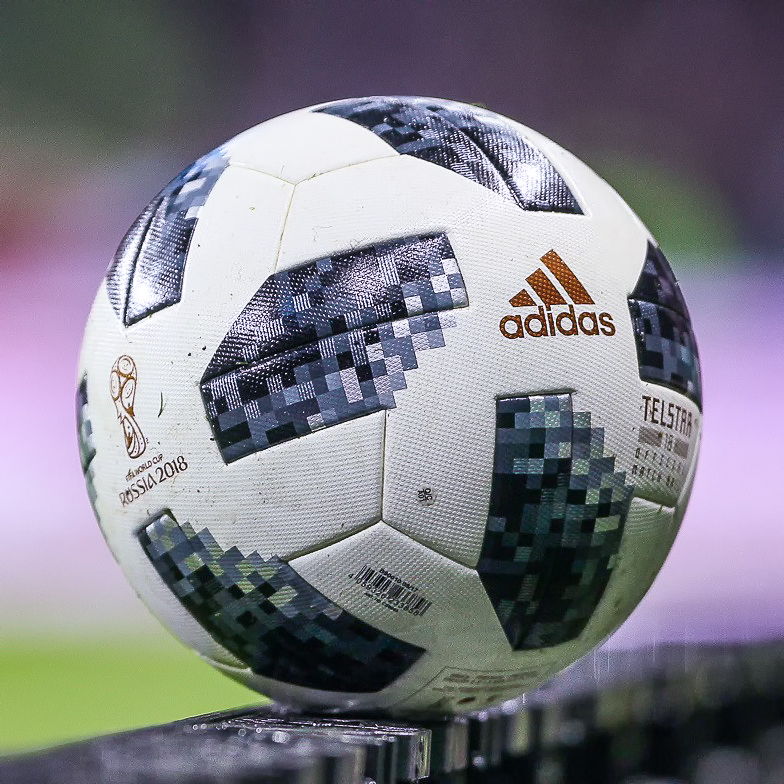
Match ball "Telstar 18"

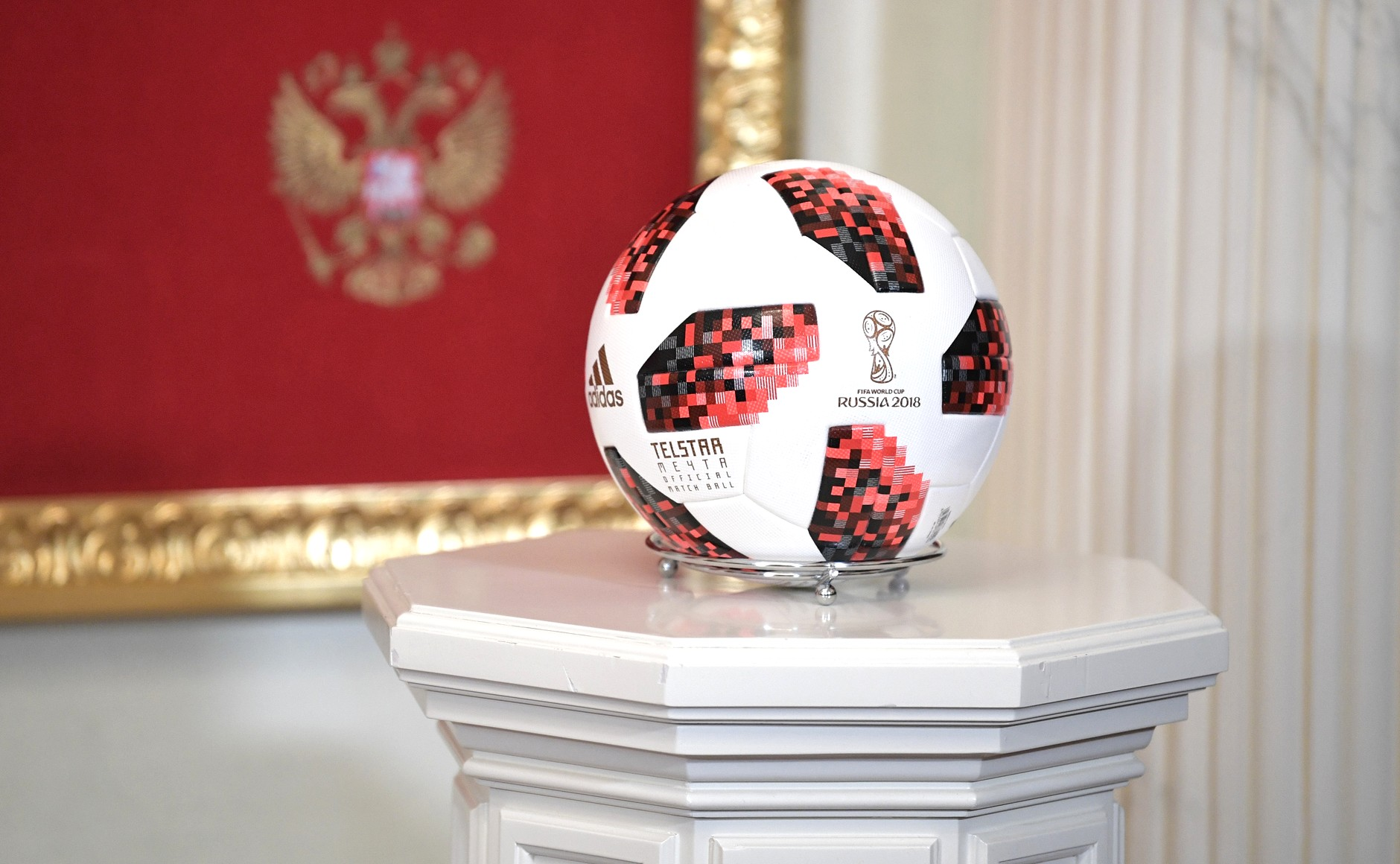
Match ball for the knockout stage, "Telstar Mechta"

The official match ball, the "Telstar 18", was unveiled on 9 November 2017. It was based on the name and design of the first Adidas World Cup ball from 1970. A special red-coloured variation, "Telstar Mechta", was used for the knockout stage of the tournament. The word mechta (Russian: мечта) means "dream" or "ambition".

Goalkeepers noted that the ball was slippery and prone to having unpredictable trajectory. In addition, two Telstar 18 balls popped in the midst of a first-round match between France and Australia, leading to further discussions over the ball's performance.

=== Music ===
The official song of the tournament was "Live It Up", with vocals by Will Smith, Nicky Jam and Era Istrefi, released on 25 May 2018. Its music video was released on 8 June 2018.

== Controversies ==
Thirty-three footballers who were alleged to be part of the Russian steroid programme are listed in the McLaren Report. On 22 December 2017, it was reported that FIFA had fired a doctor who had been investigating doping in Russian football. On 22 May 2018, FIFA stated that the investigations concerning all Russian players named for the provisional squad of the FIFA World Cup in Russia had been completed, with the result that insufficient evidence was found to support anti-doping rule violations. FIFA's medical committee also decided that Russian personnel would not be involved in performing drug testing procedures at the tournament, an action taken to reassure teams that samples would not be tampered with.

Russia relaxed its visa rules during the World Cup, allowing Fan ID holders to enter and exit Russia without a visa through 31 December 2018. Traffickers exploited this system to bring foreign sex trafficking victims into the country, especially from Nigeria. Reuters had raised concerns about the victims' conditions, who had allegedly been forced into prostitution, with some of them enduring violent abuse. Russian authorities were accused of doing little to fix the issue, allegedly because many locals blamed the victims for falling into prostitution.

=== Response to Skripal poisoning ===
In response to the March 2018 poisoning of Sergei and Yulia Skripal, British prime minister Theresa May announced that no British ministers or members of the royal family would attend the World Cup, and issued a warning to any travelling England fans. Russia responded to the comments from the UK Parliament claiming that the West are trying to "take the World Cup out of Russia". The Ministry of Foreign Affairs (Russia) denounced Boris Johnson's statements that compared the event to the 1936 Olympics held in Nazi Germany as "poisoned with venom of hate, unprofessionalism and boorishness" and "unacceptable and unworthy" parallel towards Russia, a "nation that lost millions of lives in fighting Nazism".

== Critical reception ==
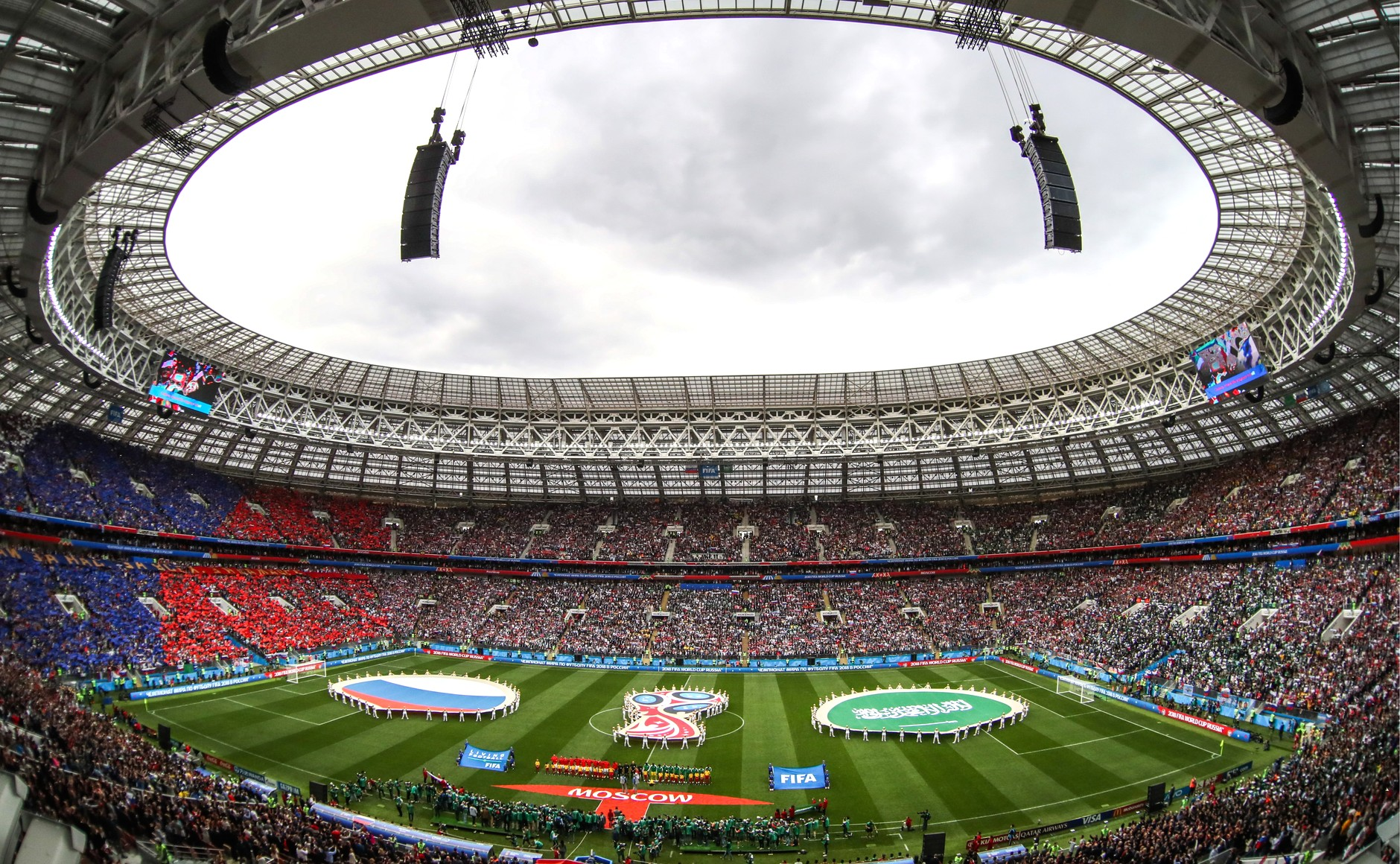
Facilities–such as the refurbished Luzhniki Stadium (pictured)–were one aspect of Russia's perceived success.

At the close of the World Cup, Russia was widely praised for its success in hosting the tournament, with Steve Rosenberg of the BBC deeming it "a resounding public relations success" for Putin, adding: "The stunning new stadiums, free train travel to venues and the absence of crowd violence has impressed visiting supporters. Russia has come across as friendly and hospitable: a stark contrast with the country's authoritarian image. All the foreign fans I have spoken to are pleasantly surprised."

Despite the British Foreign Office and MPs repeatedly warning English football fans travelling to Russia of "racist or homophobic intimidation, hooligan violence and anti-British hostility", fans who did travel said they received a warm welcome from ordinary citizens after arriving in Russia.

FIFA president Gianni Infantino stated: "Everyone discovered a beautiful country, a welcoming country, that is keen to show the world that everything that has been said before might not be true. A lot of preconceived ideas have been changed because people have seen the true nature of Russia." Infantino has proclaimed Russia 2018 to be "the best World Cup ever." 98 per cent of the stadiums were sold out, there were 3 billion viewers on TV around the world and 7 million fans visited the fan fests. It was the most viewed World Cup to date, and the third most viewed television broadcast, surpassing the 2008 Summer Olympics.

== Sponsorship ==
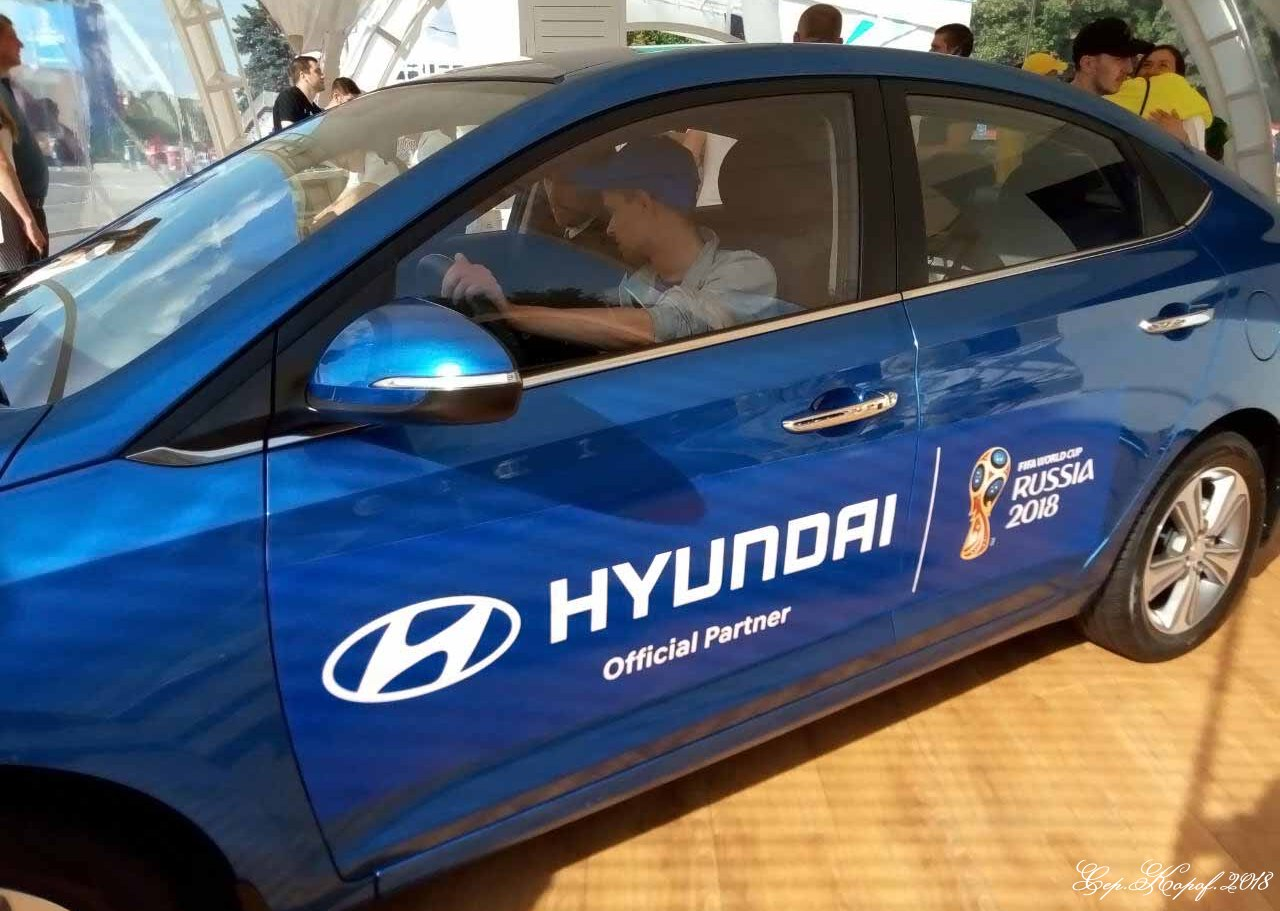
Hyundai was one of the sponsors of FIFA World Cup 2018.

The sponsors of the 2018 World Cup are divided into four categories: FIFA Partners, FIFA World Cup Sponsors and African, Asian and European supporters. This marks the first time a FIFA World Cup is sponsored by supporters from three different regions.

FIFA partners	FIFA World Cup sponsors	African supporters	Asian supporters	European supporters
Adidas; Coca-Cola; Gazprom; Hyundai–Kia; Qatar Airways; Visa; Wanda Group	Anheuser-Busch InBev; Hisense; McDonald's; Mengniu Dairy; Vivo	Egypt – Experience & Invest	Diking; Luci; Yadea	Alfa-Bank; Alrosa; Rostelecom; Russian Railways

== Audience ==
A combined 3.572 billion unique viewers (live global 1-minute reach) – more than half of the global population aged four and over – tuned in to world football's ultimate competition, according to audience data for official broadcast coverage of the 2018 FIFA World Cup.

The average global live audience for every game of the tournament was 191 million viewers (for a cumulative live audience of 12.224 billion viewers), a 2.1% increase over the 2014 tournament average of 187 million viewers, including that average audience in the early stages (group stage and round of 16) were bigger than in 2014. However, in 2018, the audience was 15 per cent smaller for the semi-finals, 17 per cent for the match for third place, and 5.1 per cent for the final, which was watched by 517 million people on average (only in-home TV viewers), compared to 545 million in 2014. Presumably, the reason for that is the smaller countries involved in the top four games compared to those in 2014, and only one global region (Europe) being represented in 2018 (compared to South America and Europe in 2014). However the live global 1-minute reach of the final was 1.12 billion people (884.37 in-home TV viewers and 231.82 million out-of-home or digital-only viewers).

== See also ==
- FIFA World Cup
- FIFA World Cup hosts
- 2017 FIFA Confederations Cup
- 2019 FIFA Women's World Cup
