= 2018 FIFA World Cup knockout stage =

The knockout stage of the 2018 FIFA World Cup was the second and final stage of the competition, following the group stage. It began on 30 June with the round of 16 and ended on 15 July with the final match, held at the Luzhniki Stadium in Moscow. The top two teams from each group (16 in total) advanced to the knockout stage to compete in a single-elimination style tournament. A match for third place was also played between the two losing teams of the semi-finals.

France won the final 4–2 against Croatia for their second title, while Belgium won the match for third place 2–0 over England.

All times listed are local time.

== Format ==
In the knockout stage, if a match was level at the end of 90 minutes of normal playing time, extra time was played (two periods of 15 minutes each), where each team was allowed to make a fourth substitution. If still tied after extra time, the match was decided by a penalty shoot-out to determine the winners.

== Qualified teams ==
The top two placed teams from each of the eight groups qualified for the knockout stage.

Group	Winners	Runners-up
A	Uruguay	Russia
B	Spain	Portugal
C	France	Denmark
D	Croatia	Argentina
E	Brazil	Switzerland
F	Sweden	Mexico
G	Belgium	England
H	Colombia	Japan

== Bracket ==
Round of 16
30 June – Sochi
Uruguay	2
Portugal	1
30 June – Kazan
France	4
Argentina	3
2 July – Samara
Brazil	2
Mexico	0
2 July – Rostov-on-Don
Belgium	3
Japan	2
1 July – Moscow (Luzhniki)
Spain	1 (3)
Russia (p)	1 (4)
1 July – Nizhny Novgorod
Croatia (p)	1 (3)
Denmark	1 (2)
3 July – Saint Petersburg
Sweden	1
Switzerland	0
3 July – Moscow (Otkritie)
Colombia	1 (3)
England (p)	1 (4)

Quarter-finals
6 July – Nizhny Novgorod
Uruguay	0
France	2
6 July – Kazan
Brazil	1
Belgium	2
7 July – Sochi
Russia	2 (3)
Croatia (p)	2 (4)
7 July – Samara
Sweden	0
England	2

Semi-finals
10 July – Saint Petersburg
France	1
Belgium	0
11 July – Moscow (Luzhniki)
Croatia (a.e.t.)	2
England	1

Final
15 July – Moscow (Luzhniki)
France	4
Croatia	2
Match for third place
14 July – Saint Petersburg
Belgium	2
England	0

== Round of 16 ==
=== France vs Argentina ===
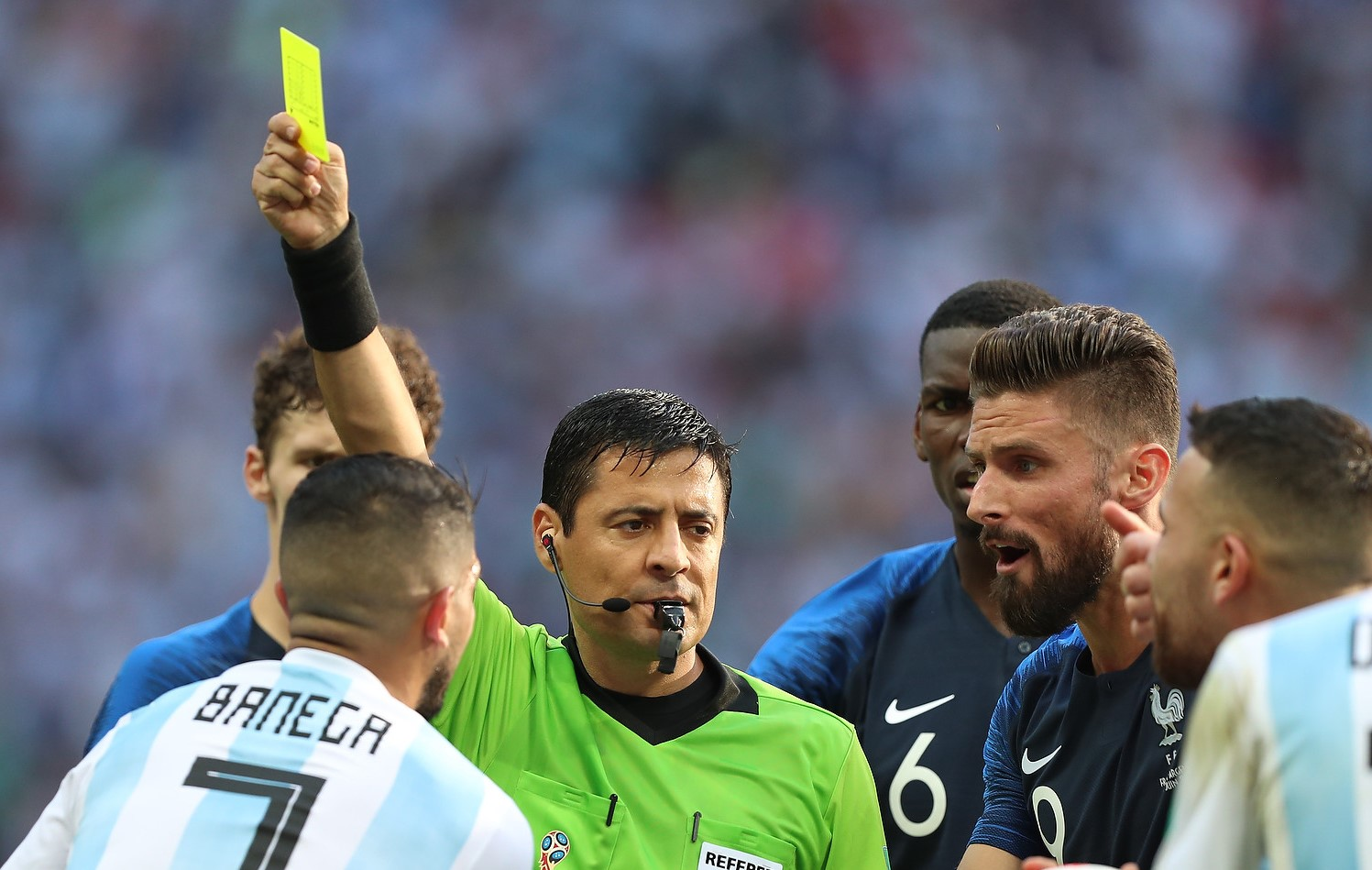
Match referee Alireza Faghani presents one of eight yellow cards during the match.

The teams had faced each other in 11 previous matches, including two World Cup group stage matches, both won by Argentina (1–0 in 1930, and 2–1 in 1978).

After nine minutes, Antoine Griezmann's 25-yard free-kick crashed back off Franco Armani's crossbar. After picking the ball up deep inside his own half, Kylian Mbappé set off on a run that was halted when Marcos Rojo hauled him down just inside the area. Griezmann stepped up and converted from the spot, sending the ball low to Armani's right. Four minutes before the interval, Ángel Di María shot from distance with his left foot to beat Hugo Lloris into the top right corner of the net. Three minutes after the restart, Éver Banega's free-kick was headed out towards Lionel Messi whose effort towards goal from the right was diverted past Lloris by Gabriel Mercado with his left leg. Nine minutes later, Lucas Hernandez's cross from the left found Benjamin Pavard, who shot a half-volley from outside the area, sending it into Armani's top-right corner. Pavard’s goal was later voted the best goal of the tournament. Mbappé put France ahead again in the 64th minute when he picked up a loose ball in the left of the area, found a yard of space and fired in low with his left foot under Armani. His second – a first-time low finish from the right of the penalty area with his right foot – followed just four minutes later. Sergio Agüero nodded home in the third minute of stoppage time from a Messi cross from the right. Argentina, however, was unable to equalize to send the match to extra-time from being eliminated of the tournament . This game was hailed as "one of the greatest World Cup games of all time" by The Independent.

With this match, Didier Deschamps became the longest-serving coach in the history of the France national team with his 80th game in charge of France, moving ahead of his predecessor Raymond Domenech. Mbappé became the first teenager to score at least twice in a World Cup tournament since Michael Owen in 1998, and the first teenager to score at least twice in a single World Cup match since Pelé netted twice for Brazil against Sweden in the 1958 final. Argentina became the first team to score at least three goals but still lose a World Cup match since the Soviet Union vs Belgium in 1986, and was also the first time that Argentina had been eliminated in the round of 16 since 1994, when they were defeated by Romania.

30 June 2018
17:00 MSK (UTC+3)

France	4–3	Argentina
Griezmann 13' (pen.); Pavard 57'; Mbappé 64', 68'		Di María 41'; Mercado 48'; Agüero 90+3'

Kazan Arena, Kazan
Attendance: 42,873
Referee: Alireza Faghani (Iran)

France	Argentina

GK	1	Hugo Lloris (c)
RB	2	Benjamin Pavard	(yellow card) 73'
CB	4	Raphaël Varane
CB	5	Samuel Umtiti
LB	21	Lucas Hernandez
CM	13	N'Golo Kanté
CM	6	Paul Pogba
RW	10	Kylian Mbappé		(substituted off) 89'
AM	7	Antoine Griezmann		(substituted off) 83'
LW	14	Blaise Matuidi	(yellow card) 72'	(substituted off) 75'
CF	9	Olivier Giroud	(yellow card) 90+3'
Substitutions:
MF	12	Corentin Tolisso		(substituted on) 75'
FW	18	Nabil Fekir		(substituted on) 83'
FW	20	Florian Thauvin		(substituted on) 89'
Manager:
Didier Deschamps

GK	12	Franco Armani
RB	2	Gabriel Mercado
CB	17	Nicolás Otamendi	(yellow card) 90+3'
CB	16	Marcos Rojo	(yellow card) 11'	(substituted off) 46'
LB	3	Nicolás Tagliafico	(yellow card) 19'
CM	15	Enzo Pérez		(substituted off) 66'
CM	14	Javier Mascherano	(yellow card) 43'
CM	7	Éver Banega	(yellow card) 50'
RF	22	Cristian Pavón		(substituted off) 75'
CF	10	Lionel Messi (c)
LF	11	Ángel Di María
Substitutions:
DF	6	Federico Fazio		(substituted on) 46'
FW	19	Sergio Agüero		(substituted on) 66'
MF	13	Maximiliano Meza		(substituted on) 75'
Manager:
Jorge Sampaoli

Man of the Match:
Kylian Mbappé (France)

Assistant referees:
Reza Sokhandan (Iran)
Mohammadreza Mansouri (Iran)
Fourth official:
Julio Bascuñán (Chile)
Reserve assistant referee:
Christian Schiemann (Chile)
Video assistant referee:
Massimiliano Irrati (Italy)
Assistant video assistant referees:
Paweł Gil (Poland)
Carlos Astroza (Chile)
Paolo Valeri (Italy)

=== Uruguay vs Portugal ===
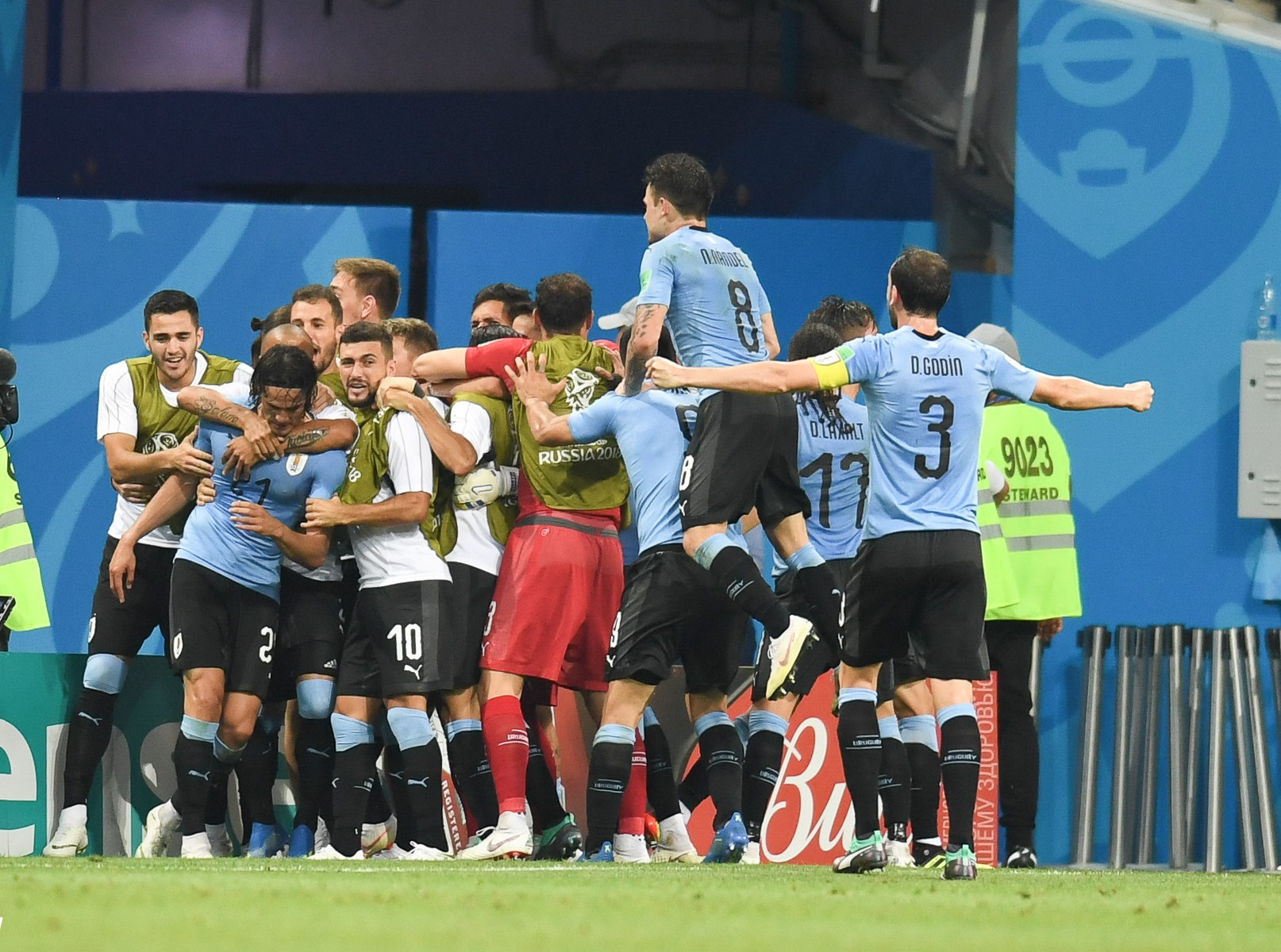
The Uruguayan team celebrates after Edinson Cavani scores his team's second goal in the 62nd minute.

The teams had met in two previous matches, most recently in Brazil Independence Cup in 1972, the match ending in a 1–1 draw.

In the seventh minute, Edinson Cavani switched play from right to left with a sweeping pass out to Luis Suárez, who delivered a cross which the former crashed home at the back post from six yards out. In the 55th minute, Raphaël Guerreiro delivered a cross from a short corner on the left, which Pepe finished with a downward header. Just seven minutes later, Rodrigo Bentancur collected the ball around 30 yards out and slipped a pass out to Cavani on the left side of the penalty area, Cavani then shot a curling right-foot strike into the right corner of the net to reclaim the lead for Uruguay. Bernardo Silva shot off-target with the goal gaping after Fernando Muslera's mistake, with Cavani seeming to pick up an injury in the scramble.

Pepe, aged 35 years and 124 days, became Portugal's oldest goal-scorer at a FIFA World Cup. This was the first time Uruguay won their opening four games at a World Cup tournament since 1930, with the fourth game in that run being their 4–2 victory over Argentina in the final.

30 June 2018
21:00 MSK (UTC+3)

Uruguay	2–1	Portugal
Cavani 7', 62'		Pepe 55'

Fisht Olympic Stadium, Sochi
Attendance: 44,287
Referee: César Arturo Ramos (Mexico)

Uruguay	Portugal

GK	1	Fernando Muslera
RB	22	Martín Cáceres
CB	2	José Giménez
CB	3	Diego Godín (c)
LB	17	Diego Laxalt
RM	8	Nahitan Nández	(substituted off) 81'
CM	14	Lucas Torreira
CM	15	Matías Vecino
LM	6	Rodrigo Bentancur	(substituted off) 63'
CF	9	Luis Suárez
CF	21	Edinson Cavani	(substituted off) 74'
Substitutions:
MF	7	Cristian Rodríguez	(substituted on) 63'
FW	11	Cristhian Stuani	(substituted on) 74'
MF	5	Carlos Sánchez	(substituted on) 81'
Manager:
Óscar Tabárez

GK	1	Rui Patrício
RB	15	Ricardo Pereira
CB	3	Pepe
CB	6	José Fonte
LB	5	Raphaël Guerreiro
RM	11	Bernardo Silva
CM	14	William Carvalho
CM	23	Adrien Silva		(substituted off) 65'
LM	10	João Mário		(substituted off) 84'
CF	17	Gonçalo Guedes		(substituted off) 74'
CF	7	Cristiano Ronaldo (c)	(yellow card) 90+3'
Substitutions:
FW	20	Ricardo Quaresma		(substituted on) 65'
FW	9	André Silva		(substituted on) 74'
MF	4	Manuel Fernandes		(substituted on) 84'
Manager:
Fernando Santos

Man of the Match:
Edinson Cavani (Uruguay)

Assistant referees:
Marvin Torrentera (Mexico)
Miguel Hernández (Mexico)
Fourth official:
Jair Marrufo (United States)
Reserve assistant referee:
Corey Rockwell (United States)
Video assistant referee:
Mark Geiger (United States)
Assistant video assistant referees:
Bastian Dankert (Germany)
Joe Fletcher (Canada)
Danny Makkelie (Netherlands)

=== Spain vs Russia ===
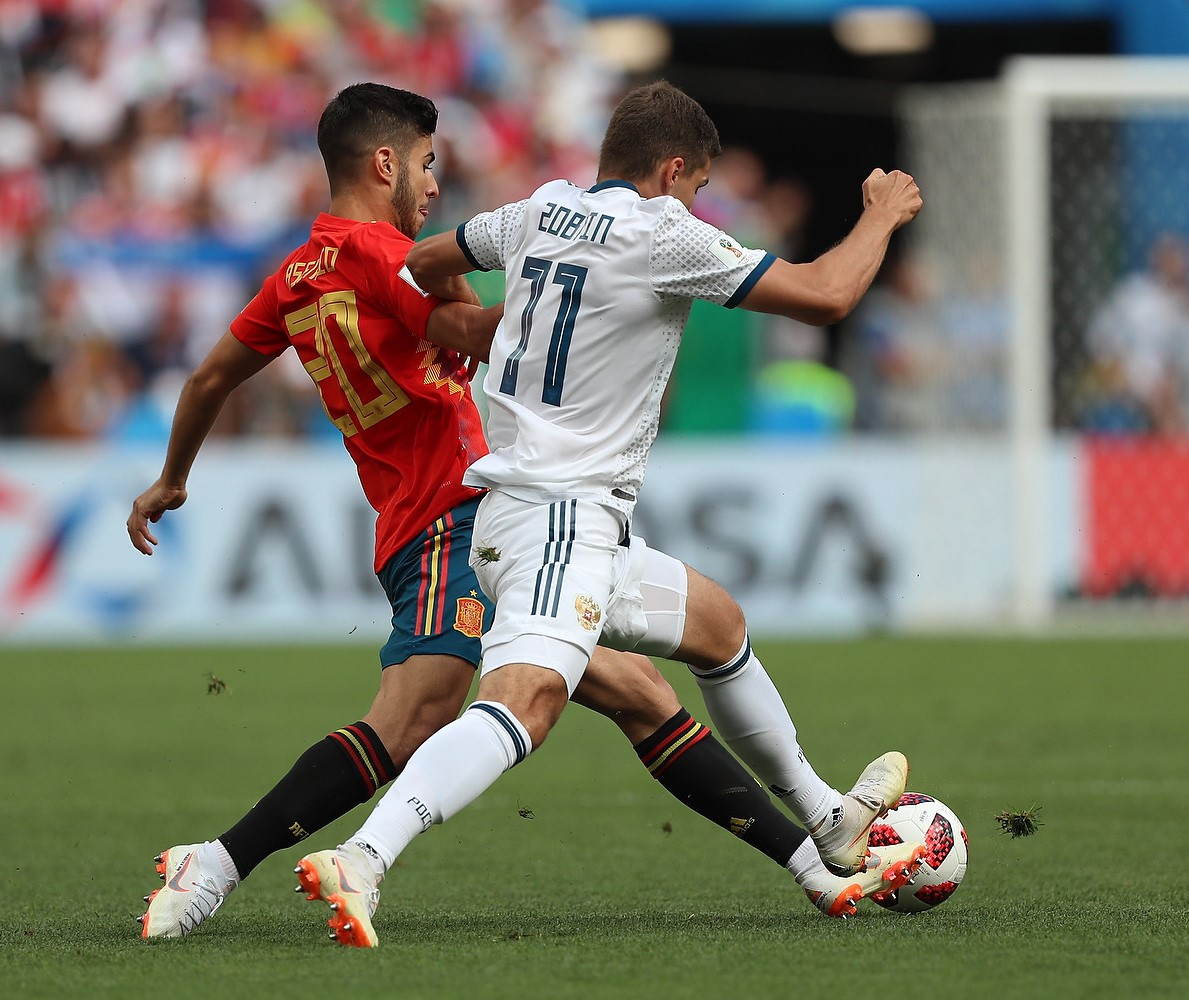
Marco Asensio (left) and Roman Zobnin (right) challenge for possession of the ball.

The teams had met in six previous games, most recently in a friendly in 2017, which ended in a 3–3 draw. Playing as the Soviet Union, the teams had faced each other five times. Russia only had one victory over Spain.

In the 12th minute, Marco Asensio's free-kick from deep on the right saw Sergei Ignashevich grappling with Sergio Ramos at the back post, the ball bouncing past Igor Akinfeev off the defender's heel. Russia were then awarded a penalty when the ball bounced off Artem Dzyuba’s head onto Gerard Piqué’s arm in the box after a corner from the right. Artem Dzyuba shot home to the right of the net from 12 yards to send the sides into half-time level. In the 85th minute, Akinfeev got down low to his right to save a shot from Andrés Iniesta, the goalkeeper then denied Iago Aspas on the rebound. Piqué and Ramos both appeared to be held from a set-piece but, after a VAR check, the referee waved away Spain's appeals. In the penalty shoot-out, Akinfeev kept out a Koke effort and saw Aspas' effort diverted away by his leg to give Russia the win; as all Russia's penalty kicks ended up successful.

This result meant Spain lost three of their four World Cup penalty shoot-outs (after losing to Belgium in 1986, beating the Republic of Ireland in 2002 and losing to South Korea in 2002), and had still never defeated a host nation at the FIFA World Cup, after losing to Italy 0–1 in 1934, Brazil 1–6 in 1950, and South Korea after penalties in 2002. Russia reached the quarter-final of the World Cup for the first time since the break-up of the Soviet Union. Also was the first win of Russia in a knockout stage of World Cup since 1966, still like Soviet Union. Ignashevich became the oldest player to score an own goal at the World Cup, aged 38 years and 352 days. The match marked the first time in the history of the FIFA World Cup in which a fourth substitution was made during extra time, after Aleksandr Yerokhin of Russia entered the pitch in the 97th minute.

1 July 2018
17:00 MSK (UTC+3)

Spain	1–1 (a.e.t.)	Russia
Ignashevich 12' (o.g.)		Dzyuba 41' (pen.)
Penalties
Iniesta (penalty scored); Piqué (penalty scored); Koke (penalty missed); Ramos (penalty scored); Aspas (penalty missed)	3–4	(penalty scored) Smolov; (penalty scored) Ignashevich; (penalty scored) Golovin; (penalty scored) Cheryshev

Luzhniki Stadium, Moscow
Attendance: 78,011
Referee: Björn Kuipers (Netherlands)

Spain	Russia

GK	1	David de Gea
RB	4	Nacho		(substituted off) 70'
CB	3	Gerard Piqué	(yellow card) 40'
CB	15	Sergio Ramos (c)
LB	18	Jordi Alba
CM	8	Koke
CM	5	Sergio Busquets
RW	21	David Silva		(substituted off) 67'
AM	22	Isco
LW	20	Marco Asensio		(substituted off) 104'
CF	19	Diego Costa		(substituted off) 80'
Substitutions:
MF	6	Andrés Iniesta		(substituted on) 67'
DF	2	Dani Carvajal		(substituted on) 70'
FW	17	Iago Aspas		(substituted on) 80'
FW	9	Rodrigo		(substituted on) 104'
Manager:
Fernando Hierro

GK	1	Igor Akinfeev (c)
SW	4	Sergei Ignashevich
CB	3	Ilya Kutepov	(yellow card) 54'
CB	13	Fyodor Kudryashov
RWB	2	Mário Fernandes
LWB	18	Yuri Zhirkov		(substituted off) 46'
CM	19	Aleksandr Samedov		(substituted off) 61'
CM	11	Roman Zobnin	(yellow card) 71'
CM	7	Daler Kuzyayev		(substituted off) 97'
CF	22	Artem Dzyuba		(substituted off) 65'
CF	17	Aleksandr Golovin
Substitutions:
DF	14	Vladimir Granat		(substituted on) 46'
MF	6	Denis Cheryshev		(substituted on) 61'
FW	10	Fyodor Smolov		(substituted on) 65'
MF	21	Aleksandr Yerokhin		(substituted on) 97'
Manager:
Stanislav Cherchesov

Man of the Match:
Igor Akinfeev (Russia)

Assistant referees:
Sander van Roekel (Netherlands)
Erwin Zeinstra (Netherlands)
Fourth official:
Clément Turpin (France)
Reserve assistant referee:
Nicolas Danos (France)
Video assistant referee:
Danny Makkelie (Netherlands)
Assistant video assistant referees:
Paweł Gil (Poland)
Mark Borsch (Germany)
Felix Zwayer (Germany)

=== Croatia vs Denmark ===
The teams had met in five matches, which included two matches played in 1998 FIFA World Cup qualification, the first fixture ending in a 1–1 draw and the reverse fixture a 3–1 Denmark win.

In the first minute, a long throw into the Croatia penalty area by Jonas Knudsen, allowed a run to Thomas Delaney who touched the ball on to Mathias Jørgensen, who side-footed it into the net via deflections off goalkeeper Danijel Subašić and the post. After three minutes, Šime Vrsaljko's ball into the box reached Henrik Dalsgaard, whose clearance hit Andreas Christensen in the face and saw Mario Mandžukić tucking the ball between Kasper Schmeichel and the left post with a shot on the turn from six yards. During extra time, Ante Rebić burst clear of the Denmark defence and was felled by Mathias Jørgensen when he was clean through on goal, only for Schmeichel to save Luka Modrić's spot-kick by diving down to his left and clutching the ball to his chest. In the shoot-out, Subašić tipped off Christian Eriksen's penalty onto the post but Schmeichel saved from Milan Badelj to bring the sides level. Lasse Schöne's shot was saved by Subašić and Josip Pivarić was denied by an acrobatic Schmeichel stop. On the final spot kicks for both the teams, Nicolai Jørgensen took a shot from a staggered run-up which Subašić saved with his feet, before Ivan Rakitić slotted the ball into the bottom left corner of the net.

Croatia qualified for their first World Cup quarter-final since 1998.

1 July 2018
21:00 MSK (UTC+3)

Croatia	1–1 (a.e.t.)	Denmark
Mandžukić 4'		M. Jørgensen 1'
Penalties
Badelj (penalty missed); Kramarić (penalty scored); Modrić (penalty scored); Pivarić (penalty missed); Rakitić (penalty scored)	3–2	(penalty missed) Eriksen; (penalty scored) Kjær; (penalty scored) Krohn-Dehli; (penalty missed) Schöne; (penalty missed) N. Jørgensen

Nizhny Novgorod Stadium, Nizhny Novgorod
Attendance: 40,851
Referee: Néstor Pitana (Argentina)

Croatia	Denmark

GK	23	Danijel Subašić
RB	2	Šime Vrsaljko
CB	6	Dejan Lovren
CB	21	Domagoj Vida
LB	3	Ivan Strinić	(substituted off) 81'
CM	7	Ivan Rakitić
CM	11	Marcelo Brozović	(substituted off) 71'
RW	18	Ante Rebić
AM	10	Luka Modrić (c)
LW	4	Ivan Perišić	(substituted off) 97'
CF	17	Mario Mandžukić	(substituted off) 108'
Substitutions:
MF	8	Mateo Kovačić	(substituted on) 71'
DF	22	Josip Pivarić	(substituted on) 81'
FW	9	Andrej Kramarić	(substituted on) 97'
MF	19	Milan Badelj	(substituted on) 108'
Manager:
Zlatko Dalić

GK	1	Kasper Schmeichel
RB	5	Jonas Knudsen
CB	4	Simon Kjær (c)
CB	13	Mathias Jørgensen	(yellow card) 115'
LB	14	Henrik Dalsgaard
CM	6	Andreas Christensen		(substituted off) 46'
CM	8	Thomas Delaney		(substituted off) 98'
CM	10	Christian Eriksen
RF	20	Yussuf Poulsen
CF	21	Andreas Cornelius		(substituted off) 66'
LF	11	Martin Braithwaite		(substituted off) 106'
Substitutions:
MF	19	Lasse Schöne		(substituted on) 46'
FW	9	Nicolai Jørgensen		(substituted on) 66'
MF	2	Michael Krohn-Dehli		(substituted on) 98'
FW	23	Pione Sisto		(substituted on) 106'
Manager:
(Norway) Åge Hareide

Man of the Match:
Kasper Schmeichel (Denmark)

Assistant referees:
Hernán Maidana (Argentina)
Juan Pablo Belatti (Argentina)
Fourth official:
Enrique Cáceres (Paraguay)
Reserve assistant referee:
Eduardo Cardozo (Paraguay)
Video assistant referee:
Mauro Vigliano (Argentina)
Assistant video assistant referees:
Gery Vargas (Bolivia)
Roberto Díaz Pérez (Spain)
Daniele Orsato (Italy)

=== Brazil vs Mexico ===
The teams had met in 40 previous matches including two games at CONCACAF Gold Cup finals (1996 and 2003, both won by Mexico), the 1999 FIFA Confederations Cup Final (won 4–3 by Mexico), and four times in the FIFA World Cup group stage, three won by Brazil and one ending in a draw (4–0 in 1950, 5–0 in 1954, 2–0 in 1962 and 0–0 in 2014).

Hirving Lozano's half-volley was well blocked by Miranda, while at the other end, Guillermo Ochoa saved Neymar's drive from just outside the penalty area. After 25 minutes, Neymar raced past Edson Álvarez in the area and forced Ochoa into a save with his left hand. Gabriel Jesus went close in the 33rd minute, finding space in a crowded area and drilling in a left-footed strike that Ochoa palmed away. In the 51st minute, Neymar's back-heel on the edge of the area teed up Willian for a burst into the box and his scuffed cross from the left was slid into an empty net by Neymar from close range. With two minutes remaining, Neymar powered through on the left and his low effort was diverted by Ochoa's foot into the path of Roberto Firmino, who tapped the ball into an empty net from close range.

Since the introduction of the round of 16 in 1986, Mexico were eliminated at this stage of the World Cup seven times – more than twice as many as any other nation. 4 years later they were eliminated from the group stages for the first time since 1978. They were eliminated at this stage once again on home soil in 2026. This was also Mexico's fourth defeat at the hands of Brazil. In addition, with Neymar's and Firmino's goals, Brazil have now finally surpassed the record of all-time World Cup goals by any team with 228 goals (after being tied to Germany with 226 goals prior to this match) after constantly tying up the record with Germany in the group stage of this World Cup.

2 July 2018
18:00 SAMT (UTC+4)

Brazil	2–0	Mexico
Neymar 51'; Firmino 88'

Cosmos Arena, Samara
Attendance: 41,970
Referee: Gianluca Rocchi (Italy)

Brazil	Mexico

GK	1	Alisson
RB	22	Fagner
CB	2	Thiago Silva (c)
CB	3	Miranda
LB	6	Filipe Luís	(yellow card) 43'
CM	15	Paulinho		(substituted off) 80'
CM	5	Casemiro	(yellow card) 59'
RW	19	Willian		(substituted off) 90+1'
AM	11	Philippe Coutinho		(substituted off) 86'
LW	10	Neymar
CF	9	Gabriel Jesus
Substitutions:
MF	17	Fernandinho		(substituted on) 80'
FW	20	Roberto Firmino		(substituted on) 86'
DF	13	Marquinhos		(substituted on) 90+1'
Manager:
Tite

GK	13	Guillermo Ochoa
RB	21	Edson Álvarez	(yellow card) 38'	(substituted off) 55'
CB	2	Hugo Ayala
CB	3	Carlos Salcedo	(yellow card) 77'
LB	23	Jesús Gallardo
CM	16	Héctor Herrera	(yellow card) 55'
CM	4	Rafael Márquez (c)		(substituted off) 46'
CM	18	Andrés Guardado	(yellow card) 90+2'
RF	11	Carlos Vela
CF	14	Javier Hernández		(substituted off) 60'
LF	22	Hirving Lozano
Substitutions:
MF	7	Miguel Layún		(substituted on) 46'
MF	6	Jonathan dos Santos		(substituted on) 55'
FW	9	Raúl Jiménez		(substituted on) 60'
Manager:
(Colombia) Juan Carlos Osorio

Man of the Match:
Neymar (Brazil)

Assistant referees:
Elenito Di Liberatore (Italy)
Mauro Tonolini (Italy)
Fourth official:
Antonio Mateu Lahoz (Spain)
Reserve assistant referee:
Pau Cebrián Devís (Spain)
Video assistant referee:
Massimiliano Irrati (Italy)
Assistant video assistant referees:
Paweł Gil (Poland)
Carlos Astroza (Chile)
Daniele Orsato (Italy)

=== Belgium vs Japan ===
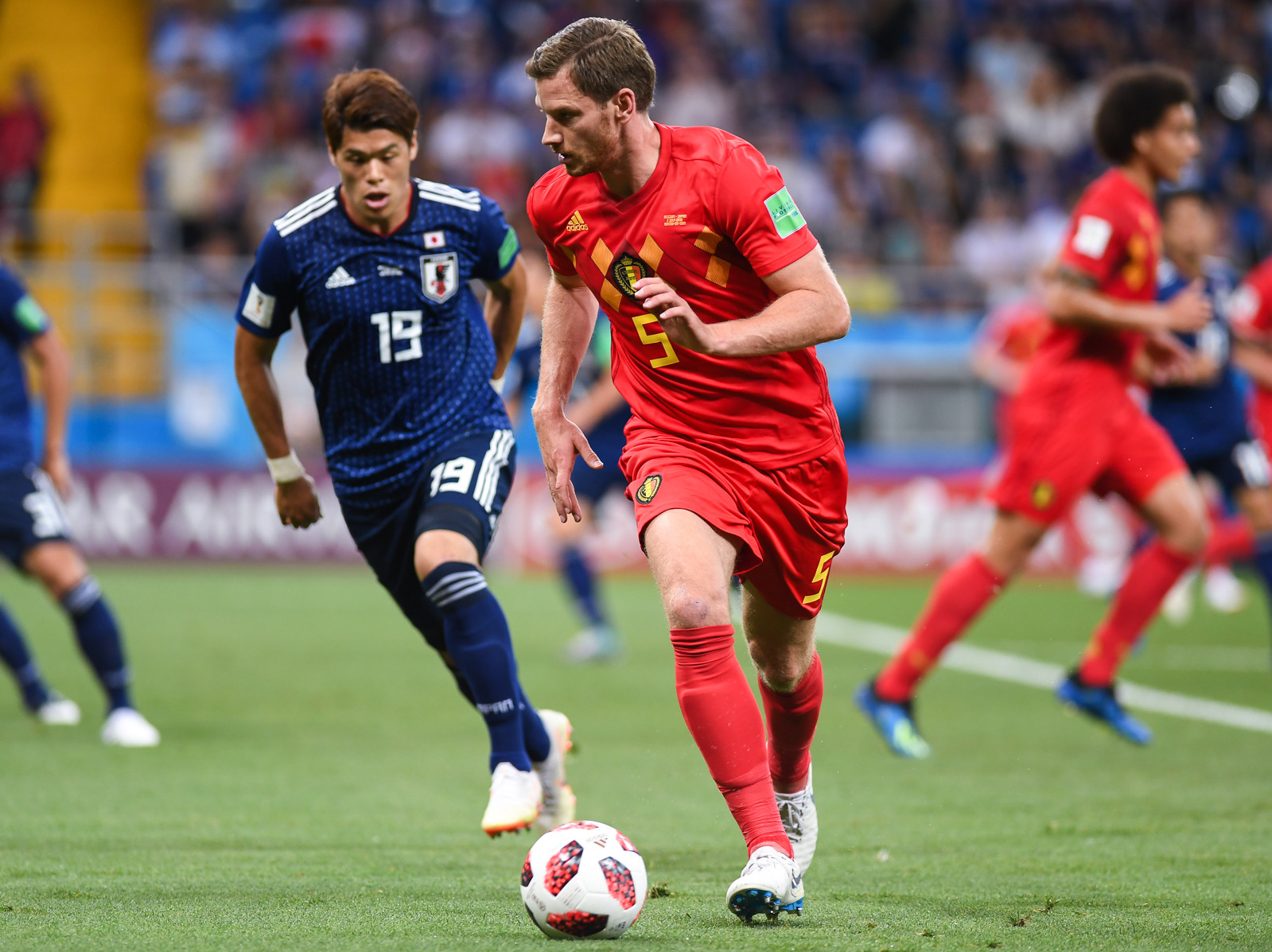
Belgium center back Jan Vertonghen in possession of the ball during the match.

The teams had faced each other in 5 previous matches, including one World Cup group stage match in 2002, which ended in a 2–2 draw. Their most recent meeting came in a friendly in 2017, a 1–0 Belgium win and also Belgium's first victory over Japan.

In the 48th minute, Gaku Shibasaki slipped a pass through to Genki Haraguchi, who rifled a shot across Thibaut Courtois from the right which went into the left corner of the net. After 4 minutes, Japan scored a second, Shinji Kagawa collecting a loose ball and feeding Takashi Inui, the midfielder working himself a yard of space before arrowing home from 25-yards into the bottom right corner of the net. Jan Vertonghen's looping header from the left eluded goalkeeper Eiji Kawashima and landed in the right corner of the net after a corner caused chaos in the Japan penalty area – and five minutes later they were back on level terms. Eden Hazard twisted and turned to create space on the left wing, his cross delivered for Marouane Fellaini to climb above his marker and crash in a downward header. In the last minute of stoppage time, Courtois found Kevin De Bruyne with a long throw, who freed Thomas Meunier with a pass, Meunier squared a low cross from the right and, when Romelu Lukaku dummied the ball, substitute Nacer Chadli was on hand to complete the comeback for Belgium with a low finish.

Belgium became the first team to come from two or more goals down to win a World Cup knockout stage match within 90 minutes since Portugal beat North Korea in the 1966 quarter-final (3–0 down, 5–3 win). Japan scored six goals at Russia 2018, their highest ever tally in a single World Cup tournament. Belgium reached the World Cup quarter-finals in successive tournaments for the first time.

2 July 2018
21:00 MSK (UTC+3)

Belgium	3–2	Japan
Vertonghen 69'; Fellaini 74'; Chadli 90+4'		Haraguchi 48'; Inui 52'

Rostov Arena, Rostov-on-Don
Attendance: 41,466
Referee: Malang Diedhiou (Senegal)

Belgium	Japan

GK	1	Thibaut Courtois
CB	2	Toby Alderweireld
CB	4	Vincent Kompany
CB	5	Jan Vertonghen
RM	15	Thomas Meunier
CM	7	Kevin De Bruyne
CM	6	Axel Witsel
LM	11	Yannick Carrasco	(substituted off) 65'
RF	14	Dries Mertens	(substituted off) 65'
CF	9	Romelu Lukaku
LF	10	Eden Hazard (c)
Substitutions:
MF	8	Marouane Fellaini	(substituted on) 65'
MF	22	Nacer Chadli	(substituted on) 65'
Manager:
(Spain) Roberto Martínez

GK	1	Eiji Kawashima
RB	19	Hiroki Sakai
CB	22	Maya Yoshida
CB	3	Gen Shoji
LB	5	Yuto Nagatomo
CM	17	Makoto Hasebe (c)
CM	7	Gaku Shibasaki	(yellow card) 40'	(substituted off) 81'
RW	8	Genki Haraguchi		(substituted off) 81'
AM	10	Shinji Kagawa
LW	14	Takashi Inui
CF	15	Yuya Osako
Substitutions:
MF	16	Hotaru Yamaguchi		(substituted on) 81'
MF	4	Keisuke Honda		(substituted on) 81'
Manager:
Akira Nishino

Man of the Match:
Eden Hazard (Belgium)

Assistant referees:
Djibril Camara (Senegal)
El Hadji Samba (Senegal)
Fourth official:
Bakary Gassama (Gambia)
Reserve assistant referee:
Jean Claude Birumushahu (Burundi)
Video assistant referee:
Felix Zwayer (Germany)
Assistant video assistant referees:
Clément Turpin (France)
Mark Borsch (Germany)
Danny Makkelie (Netherlands)

=== Sweden vs Switzerland ===
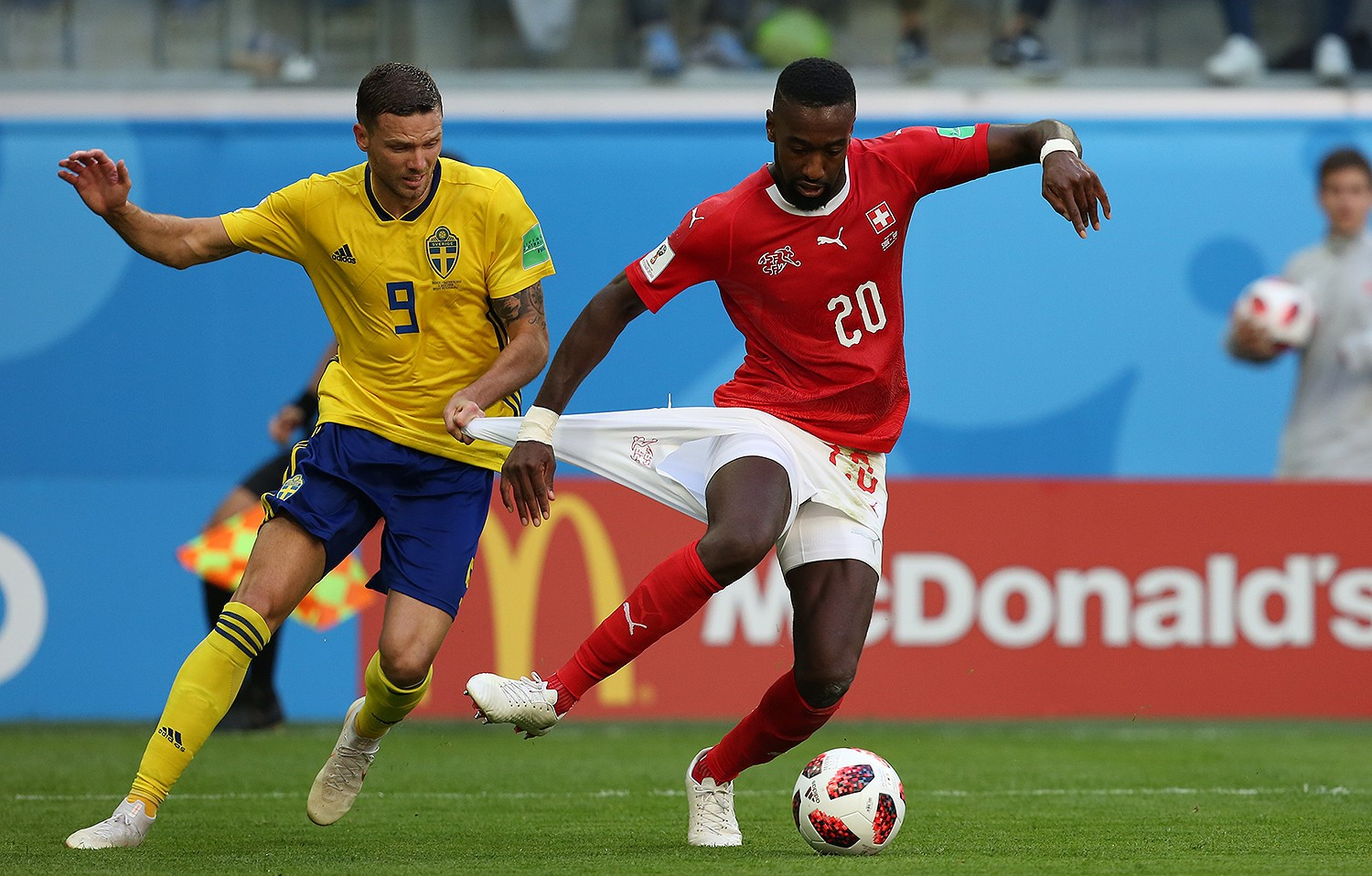
Marcus Berg (left) attempts to take possession of the ball away from Johan Djourou (right).

The teams had faced each other in 28 previous matches, which included three matches in 1962 FIFA World Cup qualification, Switzerland winning twice (3–2 and 2–1) and Sweden winning once (4–0), and also twice in 1978 FIFA World Cup qualification, both matches ending in a 2–1 Sweden win.

Stephan Lichtsteiner and Fabian Schär were both ruled out through suspension. Albin Ekdal's volley missed the target prior to the break from a Mikael Lustig cross. Ola Toivonen fired over when well positioned inside the penalty area before Emil Forsberg finally broke the deadlock, his right foot shot from just outside the penalty area clipping Manuel Akanji to beat Yann Sommer. Switzerland sent on forwards Breel Embolo and Haris Seferovic, and the latter tested Sweden goalkeeper Robin Olsen with a header in the closing stages. Sweden were denied the chance to double their lead from the spot following Michael Lang's late dismissal for taking out Martin Olsson, with Sommer beating away Toivonen's driven free-kick after a lengthy delay.

Sweden qualified for their first World Cup quarter-final since 1994. Sweden won back-to-back World Cup matches for the first time since 1958, when they won the quarter-final and semi-final on their way to the final as host nation that year. Olsen kept his third clean sheet of the 2018 World Cup, a joint-record for a Swedish goalkeeper in World Cup finals history (also three clean sheets for Ronnie Hellström in 1974 and Kalle Svensson in 1958).

3 July 2018
17:00 MSK (UTC+3)

Sweden	1–0	Switzerland
Forsberg 66'

Krestovsky Stadium, Saint Petersburg
Attendance: 64,042
Referee: Damir Skomina (Slovenia)

Sweden	Switzerland

GK	1	Robin Olsen
RB	2	Mikael Lustig	(yellow card) 31'	(substituted off) 82'
CB	3	Victor Lindelöf
CB	4	Andreas Granqvist (c)
LB	6	Ludwig Augustinsson
RM	17	Viktor Claesson
CM	13	Gustav Svensson
CM	8	Albin Ekdal
LM	10	Emil Forsberg		(substituted off) 82'
CF	9	Marcus Berg		(substituted off) 90+1'
CF	20	Ola Toivonen
Substitutions:
DF	5	Martin Olsson		(substituted on) 82'
DF	16	Emil Krafth		(substituted on) 82'
FW	22	Isaac Kiese Thelin		(substituted on) 90+1'
Manager:
Janne Andersson

GK	1	Yann Sommer
RB	6	Michael Lang	(red card) 90+4'
CB	20	Johan Djourou
CB	5	Manuel Akanji
LB	13	Ricardo Rodriguez
CM	11	Valon Behrami (c)	(yellow card) 61'
CM	10	Granit Xhaka	(yellow card) 68'
RW	23	Xherdan Shaqiri
AM	15	Blerim Džemaili		(substituted off) 73'
LW	14	Steven Zuber		(substituted off) 73'
CF	19	Josip Drmić
Substitutions:
FW	7	Breel Embolo		(substituted on) 73'
FW	9	Haris Seferovic		(substituted on) 73'
Manager:
Vladimir Petković

Man of the Match:
Emil Forsberg (Sweden)

Assistant referees:
Jure Praprotnik (Slovenia)
Robert Vukan (Slovenia)
Fourth official:
Nawaf Shukralla (Bahrain)
Reserve assistant referee:
Yaser Tulefat (Bahrain)
Video assistant referee:
Daniele Orsato (Italy)
Assistant video assistant referees:
Bastian Dankert (Germany)
Roberto Díaz Pérez (Spain)
Massimiliano Irrati (Italy)

=== Colombia vs England ===
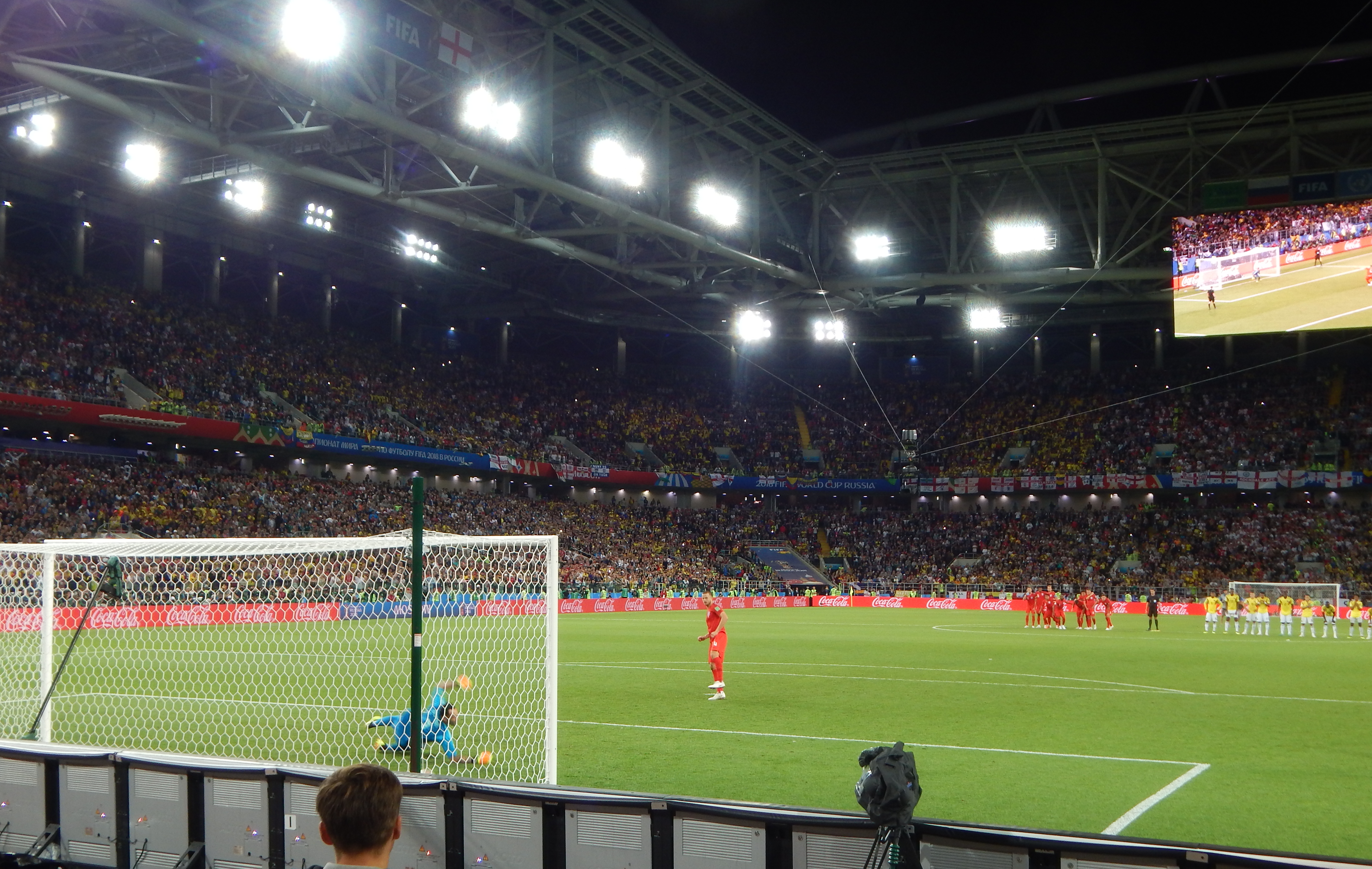
Eric Dier scores the winning goal in England's first World Cup penalty shoot-out victory, having lost thrice before.

The teams had faced each other in five previous matches, including one World Cup group stage match in 1998, a 2–0 England win. Their most recent meeting came in a friendly in 2005, a 3–2 England win.

In the 16th minute, Harry Kane arrived beyond the back post to meet a Kieran Trippier cross, but was unable to direct his header on target. Wilmar Barrios was booked when he appeared to headbutt Jordan Henderson in the build-up to a free-kick Trippier bent narrowly wide. Colombia gave away a penalty early in the second half when Carlos Sánchez dragged Kane down in the box after a corner from the right. Kane scored from 12 yards, shooting down the middle to give England the lead. Colombia forced their way into extra time, Yerry Mina scoring a downward header from a Juan Cuadrado corner from the right in injury time. Eric Dier scored the final penalty in the shoot-out, with England coming back from 3–2 down after Mateus Uribe and Carlos Bacca failed to convert their spot-kicks.

This was the first time that England had won a penalty shoot-out at the FIFA World Cup, and only the second time they had won on penalties at any major tournament (the previous occasion being against Spain at Euro 1996). Kane became the first player to score in six consecutive England appearances since Tommy Lawton did so in 1939. England conceded in injury time at the end of the second half for the first time in World Cup history, with Mina's goal coming after 92 minutes and 33 seconds.

3 July 2018
21:00 MSK (UTC+3)

Colombia	1–1 (a.e.t.)	England
Mina 90+3'		Kane 57' (pen.)
Penalties
Falcao (penalty scored); Ju. Cuadrado (penalty scored); Muriel (penalty scored); Uribe (penalty missed); Bacca (penalty missed)	3–4	(penalty scored) Kane; (penalty scored) Rashford; (penalty missed) Henderson; (penalty scored) Trippier; (penalty scored) Dier

Otkritie Arena, Moscow
Attendance: 44,190
Referee: Mark Geiger (United States)

Colombia	England

GK	1	David Ospina
RB	4	Santiago Arias	(yellow card) 52'	(substituted off) 116'
CB	13	Yerry Mina
CB	23	Davinson Sánchez
LB	17	Johan Mojica
CM	5	Wilmar Barrios	(yellow card) 41'
CM	6	Carlos Sánchez	(yellow card) 54'	(substituted off) 79'
CM	16	Jefferson Lerma		(substituted off) 61'
AM	11	Juan Cuadrado	(yellow card) 118'
AM	20	Juan Fernando Quintero		(substituted off) 88'
CF	9	Radamel Falcao (c)	(yellow card) 63'
Substitutions:
FW	7	Carlos Bacca	(yellow card) 64'	(substituted on) 61'
MF	15	Mateus Uribe		(substituted on) 79'
FW	14	Luis Muriel		(substituted on) 88'
DF	2	Cristián Zapata		(substituted on) 116'
Manager:
(Argentina) José Pékerman

GK	1	Jordan Pickford
CB	2	Kyle Walker		(substituted off) 113'
CB	5	John Stones
CB	6	Harry Maguire
DM	8	Jordan Henderson	(yellow card) 56'
RM	12	Kieran Trippier
CM	20	Dele Alli		(substituted off) 81'
CM	7	Jesse Lingard	(yellow card) 69'
LM	18	Ashley Young		(substituted off) 102'
CF	10	Raheem Sterling		(substituted off) 88'
CF	9	Harry Kane (c)
Substitutions:
MF	4	Eric Dier		(substituted on) 81'
FW	11	Jamie Vardy		(substituted on) 88'
DF	3	Danny Rose		(substituted on) 102'
FW	19	Marcus Rashford		(substituted on) 113'
Manager:
Gareth Southgate

Man of the Match:
Harry Kane (England)

Assistant referees:
Joe Fletcher (Canada)
Frank Anderson (United States)
Fourth official:
Matthew Conger (New Zealand)
Reserve assistant referee:
Tevita Makasini (Tonga)
Video assistant referee:
Danny Makkelie (Netherlands)
Assistant video assistant referees:
Paweł Gil (Poland)
Carlos Astroza (Chile)
Mauro Vigliano (Argentina)

== Quarter-finals ==
=== Uruguay vs France ===
The teams had met in eight previous matches including three times in the FIFA World Cup group stage, one won by Uruguay and the other two ending in a draw (2–1 in 1966, 0–0 in 2002 and 0–0 in 2010).

In the 15th minute, after latching on to Olivier Giroud's knockdown in the box, Kylian Mbappé headed the ball over Fernando Muslera's crossbar. Five minutes before the break, Antoine Griezmann's inswinging free kick from the right was met by Raphaël Varane, who headed the ball into the bottom left corner. Four minutes later, Martín Cáceres' header was saved by Hugo Lloris low to his right and Diego Godín shot the rebound over. In the 61st minute, Griezmann's left footed shot from outside the penalty area slipped through Muslera's hands and into the net as France doubled their lead. Mbappé went down softly under a challenge from Cristian Rodríguez, prompting angry confrontations involving Godín, Nahitan Nández and Paul Pogba. In the 73rd minute, Corentin Tolisso's shot curled over, while Griezmann also flashed a late free-kick over the top.

France became only the second team to beat three different South American sides in a single World Cup tournament, after the Netherlands in 1974. This victory marked France's 10th game unbeaten in World Cup matches against South American sides (6 wins and 4 draws), since a 2–1 loss against Argentina in 1978 – the joint longest run alongside Italy (1982 to 2010).

6 July 2018
17:00 MSK (UTC+3)

Uruguay	0–2	France
		Varane 40'; Griezmann 61'

Nizhny Novgorod Stadium, Nizhny Novgorod
Attendance: 43,319
Referee: Néstor Pitana (Argentina)

Uruguay	France

GK	1	Fernando Muslera
RB	22	Martín Cáceres
CB	2	José Giménez
CB	3	Diego Godín (c)
LB	17	Diego Laxalt
RM	8	Nahitan Nández		(substituted off) 73'
CM	14	Lucas Torreira
CM	15	Matías Vecino
LM	6	Rodrigo Bentancur	(yellow card) 38'	(substituted off) 59'
CF	9	Luis Suárez
CF	11	Cristhian Stuani		(substituted off) 59'
Substitutions:
FW	18	Maxi Gómez		(substituted on) 59'
MF	7	Cristian Rodríguez	(yellow card) 69'	(substituted on) 59'
FW	20	Jonathan Urretaviscaya		(substituted on) 73'
Manager:
Óscar Tabárez

GK	1	Hugo Lloris (c)
RB	2	Benjamin Pavard
CB	4	Raphaël Varane
CB	5	Samuel Umtiti
LB	21	Lucas Hernandez	(yellow card) 33'
CM	6	Paul Pogba
CM	13	N'Golo Kanté
RW	10	Kylian Mbappé	(yellow card) 69'	(substituted off) 88'
AM	7	Antoine Griezmann		(substituted off) 90+3'
LW	12	Corentin Tolisso		(substituted off) 80'
CF	9	Olivier Giroud
Substitutions:
MF	15	Steven Nzonzi		(substituted on) 80'
FW	11	Ousmane Dembélé		(substituted on) 88'
FW	18	Nabil Fekir		(substituted on) 90+3'
Manager:
Didier Deschamps

Man of the Match:
Antoine Griezmann (France)

Assistant referees:
Hernán Maidana (Argentina)
Juan Pablo Belatti (Argentina)
Fourth official:
Alireza Faghani (Iran)
Reserve assistant referee:
Reza Sokhandan (Iran)
Video assistant referee:
Massimiliano Irrati (Italy)
Assistant video assistant referees:
Mauro Vigliano (Argentina)
Carlos Astroza (Chile)
Paolo Valeri (Italy)

=== Brazil vs Belgium ===
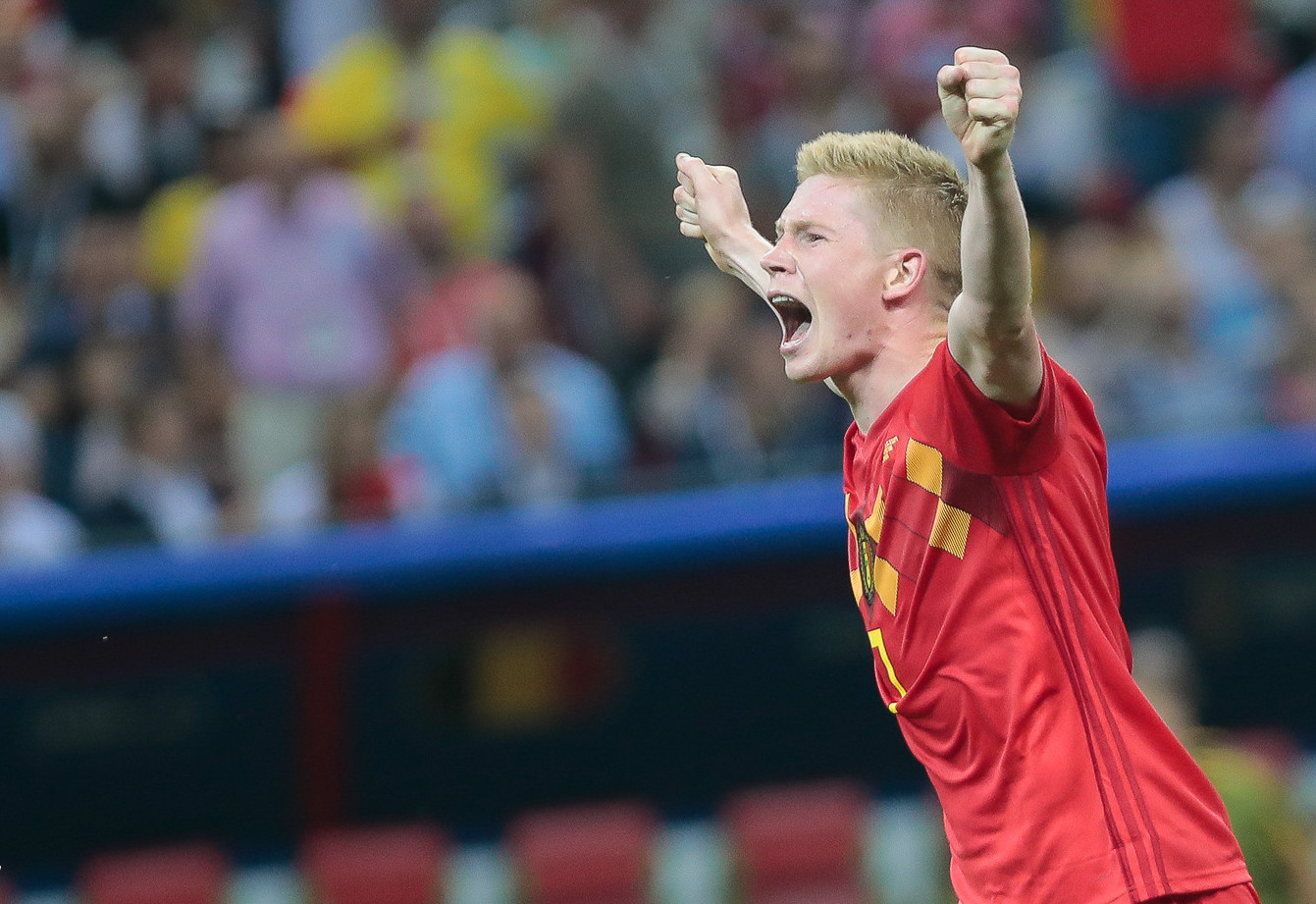
Belgium forward Kevin De Bruyne celebrating after the conclusion of the match.

The teams had met in four previous matches, including once in a World Cup knockout stage match in 2002 with Brazil winning 2–0 to advance to the quarter-finals, which was the last time the two sides had previously met.

Thiago Silva hit the post with his right thigh for Brazil after a corner in the 8th minute. It was Belgium who scored from their first corner of the game in the 13th minute; Vincent Kompany flicked on Nacer Chadli's delivery, but the decisive touch came from Fernandinho, who turned the ball past Alisson via his arm. Belgium doubled their lead by breaking from a Brazil corner in the 31st minute, after Romelu Lukaku collected the ball, turned, and embarked on a 40-yard run with a pass at the end to free Kevin De Bruyne. De Bruyne, from the edge of the penalty area, arrowed a right foot drive across Alisson and into the left corner of the net. Brazil's third change yielded a goal three minutes and 14 seconds after his introduction, Renato Augusto gliding between two Belgium defenders to nod a flicked header past Thibaut Courtois from a Philippe Coutinho cross. Coutinho's first-time shot flew wide and yet another Neymar penalty appeal was rejected, before he drew a fingertip save from Courtois in the 94th minute.

De Bruyne became the 100th player to score at the 2018 World Cup (excluding own goals). Belgium reached the World Cup semi-finals for only the second time, with them losing out to eventual winners Argentina in 1986. Belgium's victory was only their second ever against Brazil, and first since a 1963 friendly match in Brussels. This was the first time in 30 matches in all competitions that Brazil had conceded more than once in a game, since a 2–2 draw with Paraguay in March 2016. Despite Brazil's loss, with Renato Augusto's goal, Brazil have now topped the all-time record of World Cup goals by any team with a total of 229 goals.

6 July 2018
21:00 MSK (UTC+3)

Brazil	1–2	Belgium
Renato Augusto 76'		Fernandinho 13' (o.g.); De Bruyne 31'

Kazan Arena, Kazan
Attendance: 42,873
Referee: Milorad Mažić (Serbia)

Brazil	Belgium

GK	1	Alisson
RB	22	Fagner	(yellow card) 90'
CB	2	Thiago Silva
CB	3	Miranda (c)
LB	12	Marcelo
CM	15	Paulinho		(substituted off) 73'
CM	17	Fernandinho	(yellow card) 85'
RW	19	Willian		(substituted off) 46'
AM	11	Philippe Coutinho
LW	10	Neymar
CF	9	Gabriel Jesus		(substituted off) 58'
Substitutions:
FW	20	Roberto Firmino		(substituted on) 46'
FW	7	Douglas Costa		(substituted on) 58'
MF	8	Renato Augusto		(substituted on) 73'
Manager:
Tite

GK	1	Thibaut Courtois
CB	2	Toby Alderweireld	(yellow card) 47'
CB	4	Vincent Kompany
CB	5	Jan Vertonghen
RM	15	Thomas Meunier	(yellow card) 71'
CM	8	Marouane Fellaini
CM	6	Axel Witsel
LM	22	Nacer Chadli		(substituted off) 83'
RF	7	Kevin De Bruyne
CF	9	Romelu Lukaku		(substituted off) 87'
LF	10	Eden Hazard (c)
Substitutions:
DF	3	Thomas Vermaelen		(substituted on) 83'
MF	17	Youri Tielemans		(substituted on) 87'
Manager:
(Spain) Roberto Martínez

Man of the Match:
Kevin De Bruyne (Belgium)

Assistant referees:
Milovan Ristić (Serbia)
Dalibor Đurđević (Serbia)
Fourth official:
Jair Marrufo (United States)
Reserve assistant referee:
Corey Rockwell (United States)
Video assistant referee:
Daniele Orsato (Italy)
Assistant video assistant referees:
Paweł Gil (Poland)
Mark Borsch (Germany)
Felix Zwayer (Germany)

=== Sweden vs England ===
The teams had faced each other in 23 previous matches, including two times in the group stage of the World Cup, both matches ending in a draw (1–1 in 2002 and 2–2 in 2006). Their most recent meeting came in a friendly in 2012, a 4–2 Sweden win.

England took the lead in the 30th minute, Ashley Young's outswinging corner from the left finding Harry Maguire, goalkeeper Robin Olsen and Ola Toivonen on the line unable to stop the defender's downward header. Olsen did well with a strong hand to deny Raheem Sterling, who dallied with the rebound and allowed Andreas Granqvist to make a vital block. Shortly after the restart, Jordan Pickford dived to his left to palm away a header from Marcus Berg, who climbed above Young at the back post. In the 58th minute, another England set-piece caused chaos and, although Sweden initially cleared their lines when Jesse Lingard delivered a cross from the right to the back post, Dele Alli was there to double his side's advantage with a header. John Guidetti teed up strike partner Berg in the 71st minute, but Pickford tipped the effort over the crossbar.

Alli's goal was England's 11th at the 2018 World Cup, equalling the country's record of most goals at a single World Cup set in 1966. Alli became the second youngest player to score for England at the World Cup (22 years and 87 days), behind only Michael Owen (18 years and 190 days against Romania in 1998). Maguire became the first defender to score the opening England goal in a World Cup knockout match since Rio Ferdinand in 2002 against Denmark. Pickford made three saves in the match and became the youngest England goalkeeper to keep a clean sheet in a World Cup match (24 years and 122 days). England qualified for their first World Cup semi-final since 1990.

7 July 2018
18:00 SAMT (UTC+4)

Sweden	0–2	England
		Maguire 30'; Alli 59'

Cosmos Arena, Samara
Attendance: 39,991
Referee: Björn Kuipers (Netherlands)

Sweden	England

GK	1	Robin Olsen
RB	16	Emil Krafth		(substituted off) 85'
CB	3	Victor Lindelöf
CB	4	Andreas Granqvist (c)
LB	6	Ludwig Augustinsson
RM	17	Viktor Claesson
CM	7	Sebastian Larsson	(yellow card) 90+4'
CM	8	Albin Ekdal
LM	10	Emil Forsberg		(substituted off) 65'
CF	9	Marcus Berg
CF	20	Ola Toivonen		(substituted off) 65'
Substitutions:
FW	11	John Guidetti	(yellow card) 87'	(substituted on) 65'
DF	5	Martin Olsson		(substituted on) 65'
DF	18	Pontus Jansson		(substituted on) 85'
Manager:
Janne Andersson

GK	1	Jordan Pickford
CB	2	Kyle Walker
CB	5	John Stones
CB	6	Harry Maguire	(yellow card) 87'
DM	8	Jordan Henderson		(substituted off) 85'
RM	12	Kieran Trippier
CM	20	Dele Alli		(substituted off) 77'
CM	7	Jesse Lingard
LM	18	Ashley Young
CF	10	Raheem Sterling		(substituted off) 90+1'
CF	9	Harry Kane (c)
Substitutions:
DF	17	Fabian Delph		(substituted on) 77'
MF	4	Eric Dier		(substituted on) 85'
FW	19	Marcus Rashford		(substituted on) 90+1'
Manager:
Gareth Southgate

Man of the Match:
Jordan Pickford (England)

Assistant referees:
Sander van Roekel (Netherlands)
Erwin Zeinstra (Netherlands)
Fourth official:
Antonio Mateu Lahoz (Spain)
Reserve assistant referee:
Pau Cebrián Devís (Spain)
Video assistant referee:
Danny Makkelie (Netherlands)
Assistant video assistant referees:
Bastian Dankert (Germany)
Carlos Astroza (Chile)
Felix Zwayer (Germany)

=== Russia vs Croatia ===
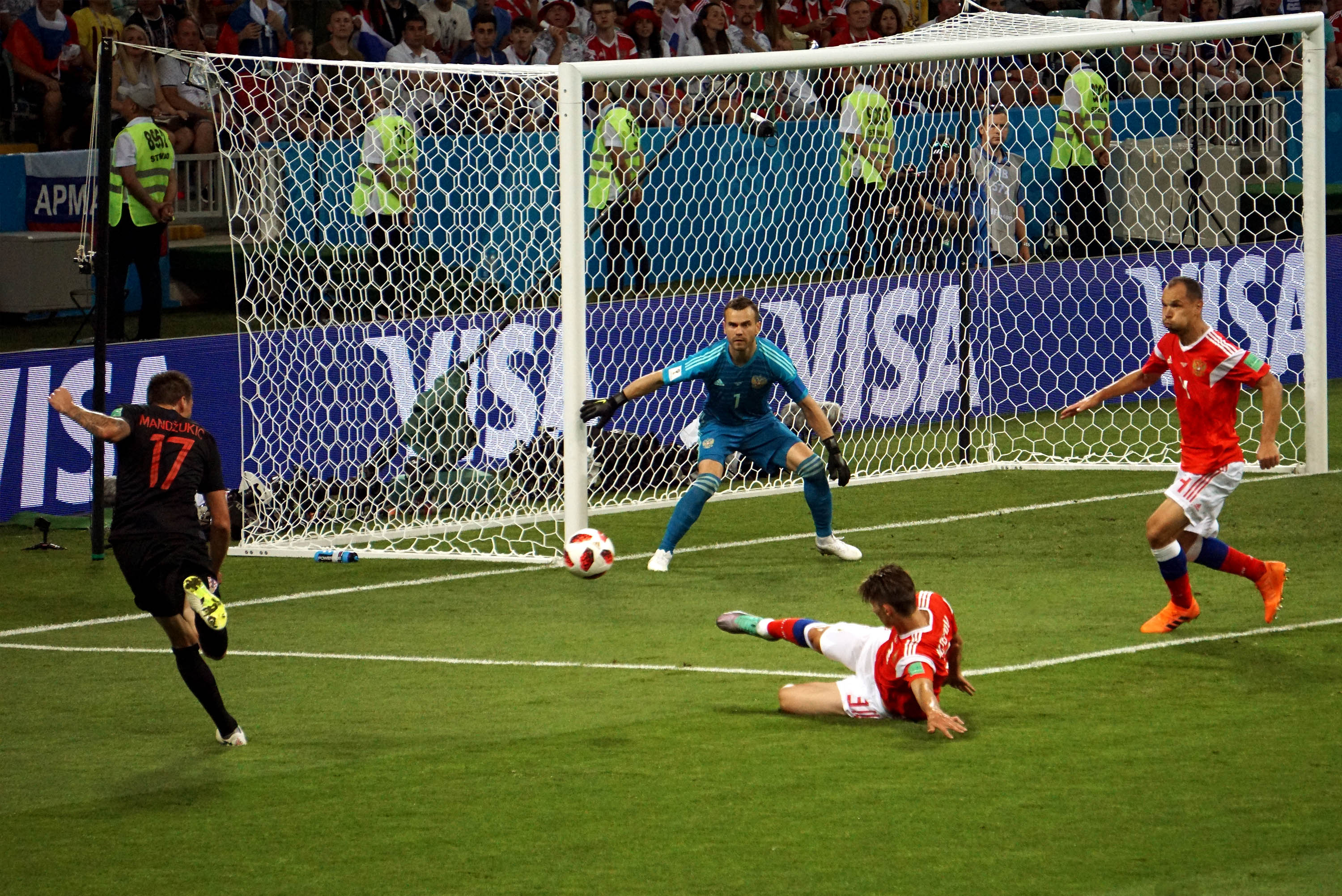
Mario Mandžukić (left) makes a cross to Andrej Kramarić (off screen to right), who would then head the ball into the goal to equalise in the 39th minute.

The teams had faced each other in three previous matches. Their most recent meeting came in a friendly in 2015, a 3–1 Croatia win.

In the 31st minute, Denis Cheryshev came in from the left and, after a one-two with Artem Dzyuba, skipped away from Luka Modrić to curl a left foot effort beyond Danijel Subašić and into the left of the net. Six minutes before half-time, Mario Mandžukić advanced down the left to set up the chance for Andrej Kramarić to head home the equaliser. In the first period of extra time, Croatia took the lead as Domagoj Vida nodded down past Igor Akinfeev and into the right corner of the net after a corner from the right. Mário Fernandes drew his team level, converting Alan Dzagoev's free-kick with a glancing header to the left corner of the net after a free-kick from the right. Penalties were required and while Fyodor Smolov's Panenka attempt with the first effort was foiled by Subašić, parity was restored when Akinfeev got down to his left to keep out Mateo Kovačić's second kick for Croatia. After Fernandes' failure, Modrić's strike found the net, following touches off Akinfeev's glove and the post. The decisive penalty fell to Ivan Rakitić, who rolled the ball into the bottom-left corner to give Croatia the win.

Russia became the first country in World Cup history to contest two shoot-outs while hosting the event. There were three headed goals in this match – the most in a World Cup match since Germany's 8–0 win over Saudi Arabia in 2002 (5 headers). Croatia became the second team to win two penalty shoot-outs at a single World Cup tournament – the other was Argentina in 1990 (against Yugoslavia and Italy). Croatia qualified for the semi-final for the first time since 1998 (their first World Cup tournament).

7 July 2018
21:00 MSK (UTC+3)

Russia	2–2 (a.e.t.)	Croatia
Cheryshev 31'; Fernandes 115'		Kramarić 39'; Vida 101'
Penalties
Smolov (penalty missed); Dzagoev (penalty scored); Fernandes (penalty missed); Ignashevich (penalty scored); Kuzyayev (penalty scored)	3–4	(penalty scored) Brozović; (penalty missed) Kovačić; (penalty scored) Modrić; (penalty scored) Vida; (penalty scored) Rakitić

Fisht Olympic Stadium, Sochi
Attendance: 44,287
Referee: Sandro Ricci (Brazil)

Russia	Croatia

GK	1	Igor Akinfeev (c)
RB	2	Mário Fernandes
CB	3	Ilya Kutepov
CB	4	Sergei Ignashevich
LB	13	Fyodor Kudryashov
CM	11	Roman Zobnin
CM	7	Daler Kuzyayev
RW	19	Aleksandr Samedov		(substituted off) 54'
AM	17	Aleksandr Golovin		(substituted off) 102'
LW	6	Denis Cheryshev		(substituted off) 67'
CF	22	Artem Dzyuba		(substituted off) 79'
Substitutions:
MF	21	Aleksandr Yerokhin		(substituted on) 54'
FW	10	Fyodor Smolov		(substituted on) 67'
MF	8	Yury Gazinsky	(yellow card) 109'	(substituted on) 79'
MF	9	Alan Dzagoev		(substituted on) 102'
Manager:
Stanislav Cherchesov

GK	23	Danijel Subašić
RB	2	Šime Vrsaljko		(substituted off) 97'
CB	6	Dejan Lovren	(yellow card) 35'
CB	21	Domagoj Vida	(yellow card) 101'
LB	3	Ivan Strinić	(yellow card) 38'	(substituted off) 74'
CM	7	Ivan Rakitić
CM	10	Luka Modrić (c)
RW	18	Ante Rebić
AM	9	Andrej Kramarić		(substituted off) 88'
LW	4	Ivan Perišić		(substituted off) 63'
CF	17	Mario Mandžukić
Substitutions:
MF	11	Marcelo Brozović		(substituted on) 63'
DF	22	Josip Pivarić	(yellow card) 114'	(substituted on) 74'
MF	8	Mateo Kovačić		(substituted on) 88'
DF	5	Vedran Ćorluka		(substituted on) 97'
Manager:
Zlatko Dalić

Man of the Match:
Luka Modrić (Croatia)

Assistant referees:
Emerson de Carvalho (Brazil)
Marcelo Van Gasse (Brazil)
Fourth official:
Janny Sikazwe (Zambia)
Reserve assistant referee:
Jerson Dos Santos (Angola)
Video assistant referee:
Massimiliano Irrati (Italy)
Assistant video assistant referees:
Wilton Sampaio (Brazil)
Roberto Díaz Pérez (Spain)
Paolo Valeri (Italy)

== Semi-finals ==
For the first time since 1966, all multiple World Cup winners were eliminated before the semi-final stage. With Uruguay and Brazil eliminated in the quarter-finals, an all-European semi-final line up was completed for the fifth time (after the 1934, 1966, 1982, and 2006 tournaments). This also ensured that a European side would win the World Cup for the fourth tournament in a row, and marked the first semi-final to not feature any one of Argentina, Brazil nor Germany, the only previous semi-final not featuring Brazil or Germany being the inaugural 1930 tournament which had Argentina.

=== France vs Belgium ===
The teams had faced each other in 73 previous matches, including two times in the World Cup, France winning both matches (3–1 in the round of 16 in 1938 and 4–2 in the match for third place in 1986). Their most recent meeting came in a friendly in 2015, a 4–3 Belgium win.

Eden Hazard twice went close, narrowly missing the target with a low, left-footed drive before seeing a curler with his right deflected over the crossbar by the head of Raphaël Varane. Hugo Lloris' full-length dive kept out a first-time strike on the turn from Toby Alderweireld, while Thibaut Courtois blocked Benjamin Pavard's attempt from a tight angle on the right at the other end. Six minutes after the break, Vincent Kompany's block turned away Olivier Giroud's shot, and Antoine Griezmann's inswinging delivery from the right to the front post was turned in by Samuel Umtiti, who outjumped his marker, Marouane Fellaini, to head beyond Courtois. Dries Mertens's cross from the right flank saw Fellaini narrowly miss the target with a header. Axel Witsel's long-range drive was pushed away by Lloris as France secured their place in the final.

With this match, it meant Didier Deschamps managed more games for France at the World Cup than any other previous France manager, overtaking Raymond Domenech and Michel Hidalgo. This was Belgium's first defeat of any kind since a friendly loss against Spain in September 2016. France reached their third World Cup final, also doing so in 1998 and 2006. Only Germany (8) and Italy (6) had reached more among European nations.

10 July 2018
21:00 MSK (UTC+3)

France	1–0	Belgium
Umtiti 51'

Krestovsky Stadium, Saint Petersburg
Attendance: 64,286
Referee: Andrés Cunha (Uruguay)

France	Belgium

GK	1	Hugo Lloris (c)
RB	2	Benjamin Pavard
CB	4	Raphaël Varane
CB	5	Samuel Umtiti
LB	21	Lucas Hernandez
CM	6	Paul Pogba
CM	13	N'Golo Kanté	(yellow card) 87'
RW	10	Kylian Mbappé	(yellow card) 90+3'
AM	7	Antoine Griezmann
LW	14	Blaise Matuidi		(substituted off) 86'
CF	9	Olivier Giroud		(substituted off) 85'
Substitutions:
MF	15	Steven Nzonzi		(substituted on) 85'
MF	12	Corentin Tolisso		(substituted on) 86'
Manager:
Didier Deschamps

GK	1	Thibaut Courtois
CB	2	Toby Alderweireld	(yellow card) 71'
CB	4	Vincent Kompany
CB	5	Jan Vertonghen	(yellow card) 90+4'
DM	6	Axel Witsel
CM	19	Mousa Dembélé		(substituted off) 60'
CM	8	Marouane Fellaini		(substituted off) 80'
RM	22	Nacer Chadli		(substituted off) 90+1'
LM	7	Kevin De Bruyne
CF	9	Romelu Lukaku
CF	10	Eden Hazard (c)	(yellow card) 63'
Substitutions:
FW	14	Dries Mertens		(substituted on) 60'
MF	11	Yannick Carrasco		(substituted on) 80'
FW	21	Michy Batshuayi		(substituted on) 90+1'
Manager:
(Spain) Roberto Martínez

Man of the Match:
Samuel Umtiti (France)

Assistant referees:
Nicolás Taran (Uruguay)
Mauricio Espinosa (Uruguay)
Fourth official:
César Arturo Ramos (Mexico)
Reserve assistant referee:
Marvin Torrentera (Mexico)
Video assistant referee:
Massimiliano Irrati (Italy)
Assistant video assistant referees:
Mauro Vigliano (Argentina)
Roberto Díaz Pérez (Spain)
Paolo Valeri (Italy)

=== Croatia vs England ===
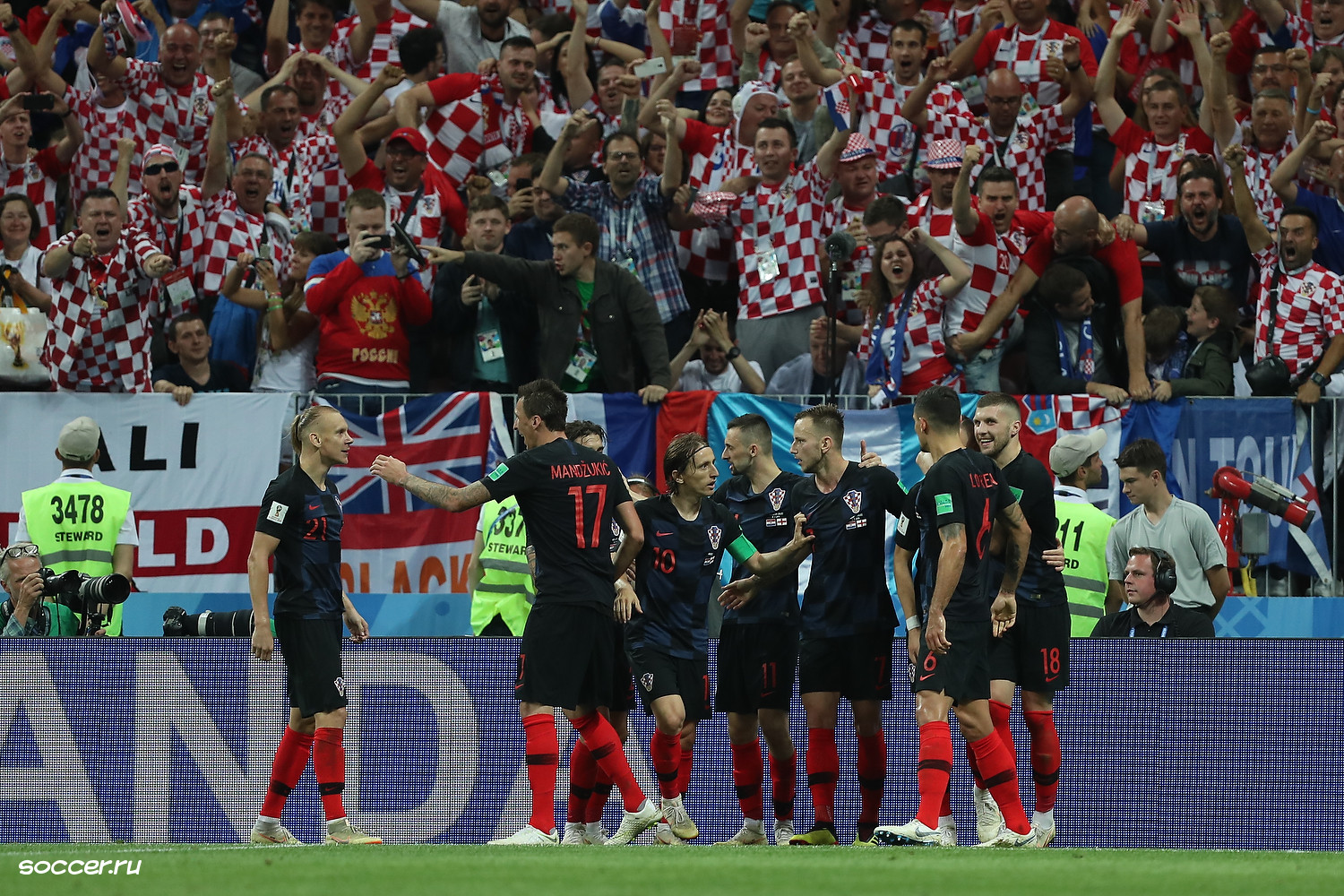
The Croatian team and their supporters celebrate after Ivan Perišić's equalising goal in the 68th minute.

The teams had faced each other in seven previous matches, which included two matches played in the 2010 FIFA World Cup qualification, England winning on both occasions (4–1 and 5–1).

Luka Modrić stopped a Dele Alli run, by fouling him at the edge of the area. Kieran Trippier found the top right corner of the net from the resulting free kick with his right foot. Harry Kane nearly doubled England's lead, but his close range shot deflected off Danijel Subašić's foot and onto the post. After half-time, Ivan Perišić met Šime Vrsaljko's deep cross from the right at head height with a flying, left-footed finish to the left of the net. Soon after, Perišić shot against the right-hand post from the left before Ante Rebić put the rebound into Jordan Pickford's hands. In extra-time, John Stones had a header cleared off the line by Vrsaljko in the 98th minute. Pickford at the other end, denied Mario Mandžukić at point-blank range after the striker met Perišić's cross from the left. But Mandžukić came out on top soon after the break, latching on to Perišić's headed pass on the left and sending a left-footed effort across Pickford to find the bottom-right corner, securing Croatia's entrance into their first ever World Cup final.

Croatia became the first team to avoid defeat after trailing in three knockout matches at a single World Cup. They became the 13th different nation to reach a World Cup final. Their first since the establishment of the country's team and the former Yugoslav country since Breakup of Yugoslavia in 1989. Trippier became the first player to score a direct free-kick for England at the World Cup since David Beckham in 2006 against Ecuador. Trippier's goal after four minutes and 44 seconds was the fastest goal scored in a World Cup semi-final since 1958 (Vavá after two minutes for Brazil v France) and was England's 12th goal in Russia, their most in a single World Cup. Croatia became the first team to play extra time in three consecutive World Cup matches since England in 1990. England scored nine goals from set-pieces at the 2018 World Cup – the most by a team in a single World Cup tournament since 1966.

11 July 2018
21:00 MSK (UTC+3)

Croatia	2–1 (a.e.t.)	England
Perišić 68'; Mandžukić 109'		Trippier 5'

Luzhniki Stadium, Moscow
Attendance: 78,011
Referee: Cüneyt Çakır (Turkey)

Croatia	England

GK	23	Danijel Subašić
RB	2	Šime Vrsaljko
CB	6	Dejan Lovren
CB	21	Domagoj Vida
LB	3	Ivan Strinić		(substituted off) 95'
CM	7	Ivan Rakitić
CM	11	Marcelo Brozović
RW	18	Ante Rebić	(yellow card) 96'	(substituted off) 101'
AM	10	Luka Modrić (c)		(substituted off) 119'
LW	4	Ivan Perišić
CF	17	Mario Mandžukić	(yellow card) 48'	(substituted off) 115'
Substitutions:
DF	22	Josip Pivarić		(substituted on) 95'
FW	9	Andrej Kramarić		(substituted on) 101'
DF	5	Vedran Ćorluka		(substituted on) 115'
MF	19	Milan Badelj		(substituted on) 119'
Manager:
Zlatko Dalić

GK	1	Jordan Pickford
CB	2	Kyle Walker	(yellow card) 54'	(substituted off) 112'
CB	5	John Stones
CB	6	Harry Maguire
DM	8	Jordan Henderson		(substituted off) 97'
RM	12	Kieran Trippier
CM	20	Dele Alli
CM	7	Jesse Lingard
LM	18	Ashley Young		(substituted off) 91'
CF	10	Raheem Sterling		(substituted off) 74'
CF	9	Harry Kane (c)
Substitutions:
FW	19	Marcus Rashford		(substituted on) 74'
DF	3	Danny Rose		(substituted on) 91'
MF	4	Eric Dier		(substituted on) 97'
FW	11	Jamie Vardy		(substituted on) 112'
Manager:
Gareth Southgate

Man of the Match:
Ivan Perišić (Croatia)

Assistant referees:
Bahattin Duran (Turkey)
Tarık Ongun (Turkey)
Fourth official:
Björn Kuipers (Netherlands)
Reserve assistant referee:
Sander van Roekel (Netherlands)
Video assistant referee:
Danny Makkelie (Netherlands)
Assistant video assistant referees:
Bastian Dankert (Germany)
Carlos Astroza (Chile)
Felix Zwayer (Germany)

== Match for third place ==
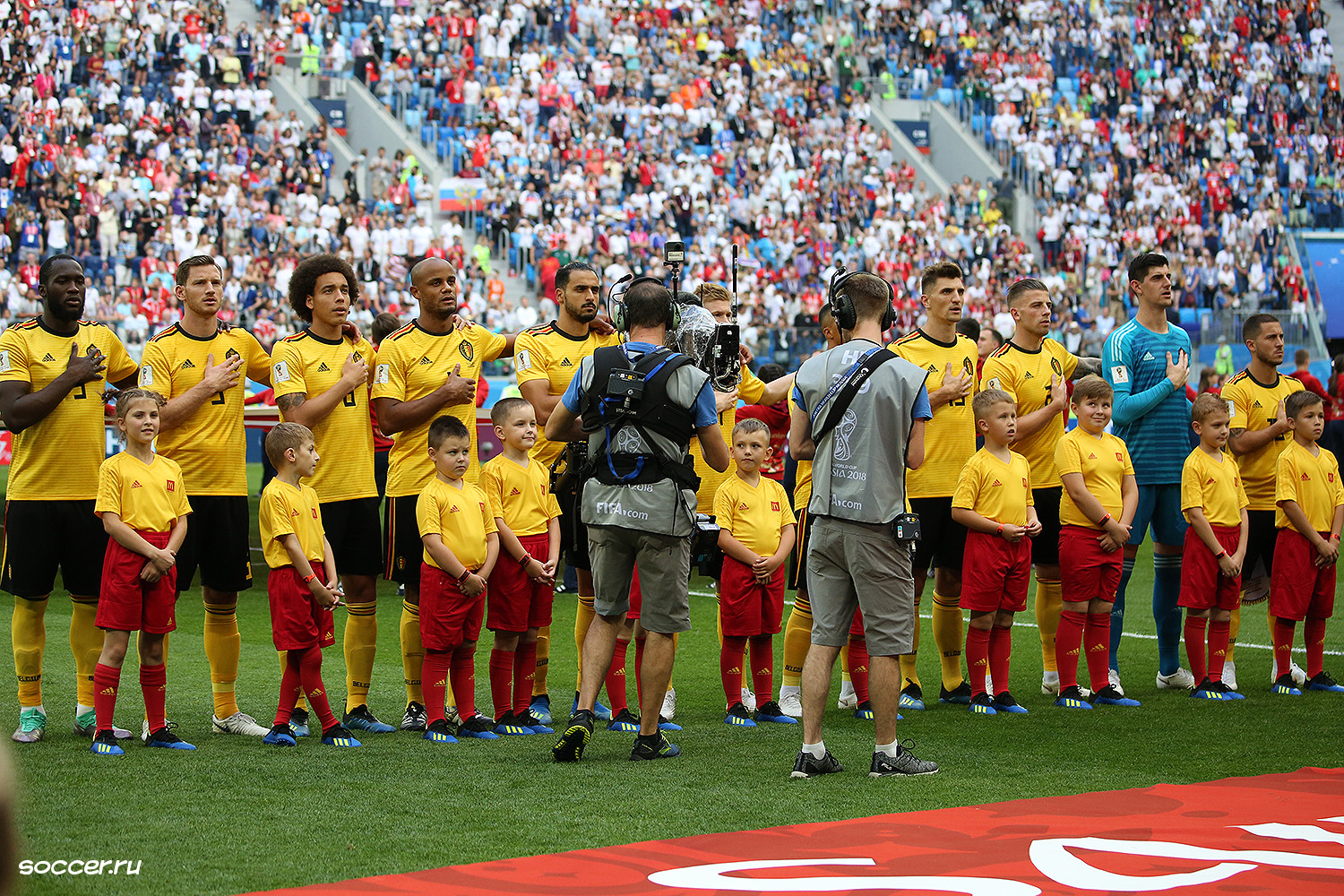
Belgium line-up before the start of the game

Belgium and England had previously met in 22 matches, including three matches at the World Cup, one round of 16 game at the 1990 FIFA World Cup which ended in a 1–0 victory for England, one group stage game at the 1954 FIFA World Cup which ended in a 4–4 draw and their most recent encounter in Group G of this tournament which Belgium won 1–0. As both were European teams, this was already set pre-match as the 10th consecutive World Cup in which European teams finished third, stretching back to 1982.

After four minutes, Thomas Meunier raced into the box to get across Danny Rose and tucked home Nacer Chadli's low cross in from the left from six yards out. Harry Kane scuffed wide of the left post, from a Raheem Sterling lay-off. In the 70th minute, Eric Dier burst through for a one-on-one and dinked over Thibaut Courtois, only to see a retreating Toby Alderweireld hack the ball off the line. Jordan Pickford made a one-handed save to deny Meunier in the 80th minute. Eden Hazard scored the second with a near-post finish with his right foot, having been sent clean through by Kevin De Bruyne.

Meunier was the 10th player to score for Belgium at the 2018 World Cup. No other team had more, equalling France in 1982 and Italy in 2006. This became Belgium's best finish at a World Cup, having previously finished fourth in 1986. This was England's 100th match at a major tournament – 69 at the World Cup and 31 at the European Championship. Since 1966, no player had been involved in more World Cup goals for Belgium than Hazard (seven – three goals and four assists), level with Jan Ceulemans (also four goals and three assists).

14 July 2018
17:00 MSK (UTC+3)

Belgium	2–0	England
Meunier 4'; E. Hazard 82'

Krestovsky Stadium, Saint Petersburg
Attendance: 64,406
Referee: Alireza Faghani (Iran)

Belgium	England

GK	1	Thibaut Courtois
CB	2	Toby Alderweireld
CB	4	Vincent Kompany
CB	5	Jan Vertonghen
RM	15	Thomas Meunier
CM	17	Youri Tielemans		(substituted off) 78'
CM	6	Axel Witsel	(yellow card) 90+3'
LM	22	Nacer Chadli		(substituted off) 39'
RF	7	Kevin De Bruyne
CF	9	Romelu Lukaku		(substituted off) 60'
LF	10	Eden Hazard (c)
Substitutions:
DF	3	Thomas Vermaelen		(substituted on) 39'
FW	14	Dries Mertens		(substituted on) 60'
MF	19	Mousa Dembélé		(substituted on) 78'
Manager:
(Spain) Roberto Martínez

GK	1	Jordan Pickford
CB	16	Phil Jones
CB	5	John Stones	(yellow card) 52'
CB	6	Harry Maguire	(yellow card) 76'
DM	4	Eric Dier
CM	21	Ruben Loftus-Cheek		(substituted off) 84'
CM	17	Fabian Delph
RM	12	Kieran Trippier
LM	3	Danny Rose		(substituted off) 46'
CF	10	Raheem Sterling		(substituted off) 46'
CF	9	Harry Kane (c)
Substitutions:
MF	7	Jesse Lingard		(substituted on) 46'
FW	19	Marcus Rashford		(substituted on) 46'
MF	20	Dele Alli		(substituted on) 84'
Manager:
Gareth Southgate

Man of the Match:
Eden Hazard (Belgium)

Assistant referees:
Reza Sokhandan (Iran)
Mohammadreza Mansouri (Iran)
Fourth official:
Malang Diedhiou (Senegal)
Reserve assistant referee:
Djibril Camara (Senegal)
Video assistant referee:
Mark Geiger (United States)
Assistant video assistant referees:
Bastian Dankert (Germany)
Joe Fletcher (Canada)
Paolo Valeri (Italy)

== Final ==
The match was the sixth meeting between France and Croatia, with France undefeated in the previous fixtures with three wins and two draws. The two sides first met in the 1998 World Cup semi-final, with hosts France winning 2–1. Their only other competitive meeting was during the group stage of Euro 2004, which finished as a 2–2 draw. Their next and most recent meeting was in a March 2011 friendly match, which finished as a 0–0 draw.

15 July 2018
18:00 MSK (UTC+3)

France	4–2	Croatia
Mandžukić 18' (o.g.); Griezmann 38' (pen.); Pogba 59'; Mbappé 65'		Perišić 28'; Mandžukić 69'

Luzhniki Stadium, Moscow
Attendance: 78,011
Referee: Néstor Pitana (Argentina)

France	Croatia

GK	1	Hugo Lloris (c)
RB	2	Benjamin Pavard
CB	4	Raphaël Varane
CB	5	Samuel Umtiti
LB	21	Lucas Hernandez	(yellow card) 41'
CM	6	Paul Pogba
CM	13	N'Golo Kanté	(yellow card) 27'	(substituted off) 55'
RW	10	Kylian Mbappé
AM	7	Antoine Griezmann
LW	14	Blaise Matuidi		(substituted off) 73'
CF	9	Olivier Giroud		(substituted off) 81'
Substitutions:
MF	15	Steven Nzonzi		(substituted on) 55'
MF	12	Corentin Tolisso		(substituted on) 73'
FW	18	Nabil Fekir		(substituted on) 81'
Manager:
Didier Deschamps

GK	23	Danijel Subašić
RB	2	Šime Vrsaljko	(yellow card) 90+2'
CB	6	Dejan Lovren
CB	21	Domagoj Vida
LB	3	Ivan Strinić		(substituted off) 81'
CM	7	Ivan Rakitić
CM	11	Marcelo Brozović
RW	18	Ante Rebić		(substituted off) 71'
AM	10	Luka Modrić (c)
LW	4	Ivan Perišić
CF	17	Mario Mandžukić
Substitutions:
FW	9	Andrej Kramarić		(substituted on) 71'
FW	20	Marko Pjaca		(substituted on) 81'
Manager:
Zlatko Dalić

Man of the Match:
Antoine Griezmann (France)

Assistant referees:
Hernán Maidana (Argentina)
Juan Pablo Belatti (Argentina)
Fourth official:
Björn Kuipers (Netherlands)
Reserve assistant referee:
Erwin Zeinstra (Netherlands)
Video assistant referee:
Massimiliano Irrati (Italy)
Assistant video assistant referees:
Mauro Vigliano (Argentina)
Carlos Astroza (Chile)
Danny Makkelie (Netherlands)

== See also ==
- 2022 FIFA World Cup knockout stage
