= Mohammadreza Mansouri =

Iranian football referee

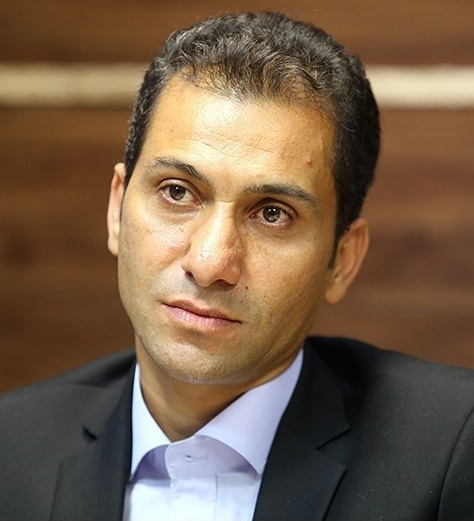
- Born: 23 April 1978 (age 48); Tehran, Imperial State of Iran

Domestic
| Years | League | Role |
| 2008– | Persian Gulf Pro League | Referee |

International
| Years | League | Role |
| 2017–present | FIFA listed | Referee |

Mohammadreza Mansouri (Persian: محمدرضا منصوري; born 23 April 1978) is an Iranian football referee. He has been FIFA listed since 2012.

== Matches ==
=== FIFA World Cup ===
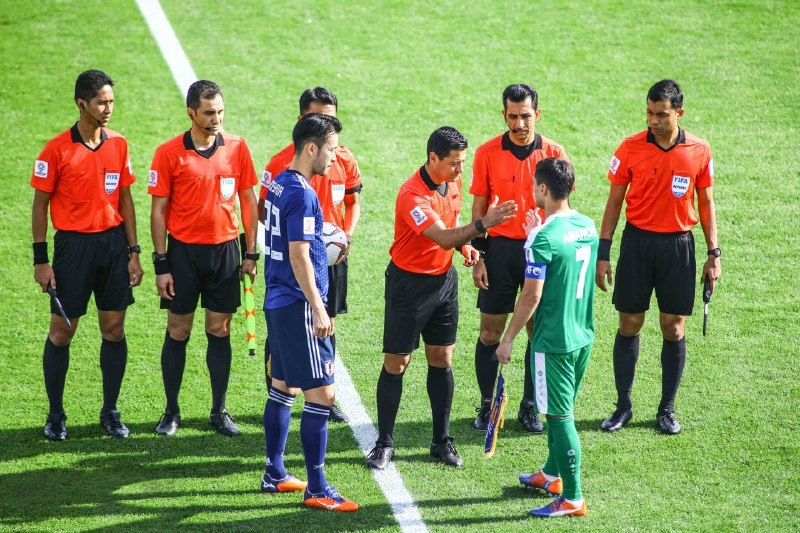
Mohammadreza Mansouri referring the Japan vs. Turkmenistan match in the 17th edition of the AFC Asian Cup..

2022 FIFA World Cup - Qatar
| Data | Match | Venue | Round |
|---|---|---|---|
| 24 Nov 2022 | Serbia – Brazil | Lusail- Doha | Group stage |
| 28 Nov 2022 | Portugal– Uruguay | Lusail - Doha | Group stage |

2018 FIFA World Cup – Russia
| Date | Match | Venue | Round |
|---|---|---|---|
| 17 June 2018 | Germany – Mexico | Moscow | Group stage |
| 27 June 2018 | Serbia – Brazil | Moscow | Group stage |
| 30 June 2018 | France – Argentina | Kazan | Round of 16 |
| 14 July 2018 | Belgium – England | Saint Petersburg | Third place play-off |

=== FIFA Confederations Cup ===
2017 FIFA Confederations Cup – Russia
| Date | Match | Venue | Round |
|---|---|---|---|
| 22 June 2017 | Germany – Chile | Kazan | Group stage |
| 27 June 2017 | Portugal – Chile | Kazan | Semi-finals |

=== Summer Olympic ===
2016 Summer Olympics – Rio de Janeiro
| Date | Match | Venue | Round |
|---|---|---|---|
| 4 August 2016 | Germany – Mexico | Salvador | Group stage |
| 10 August 2016 | Denmark – Brazil | Salvador | Group stage |
| 20 August 2016 | Germany – Brazil | Rio de Janeiro | Gold medal match |

=== AFC Asian Cup ===
2019 AFC Asian Cup – United Arab Emirates
| Date | Match | Venue | Round |
|---|---|---|---|
| 9 January 2019 | Japan – Turkmenistan | Abu Dhabi | Group stage |
| 20 January 2019 | Jordan – Vietnam | Dubai | Round of 16 |

=== FIFA Club World Cup ===
2015 FIFA Club World Cup – Japan
| Date | Match | Venue | Round |
|---|---|---|---|
| 16 December 2015 | América (Mexico) – (Democratic Republic of the Congo) TP Mazembe | Osaka | Match for fifth place |
| 20 December 2015 | River Plate (Argentina) – (Spain) Barcelona | Yokohama | Final |
