= 2018 FIFA World Cup Group F =

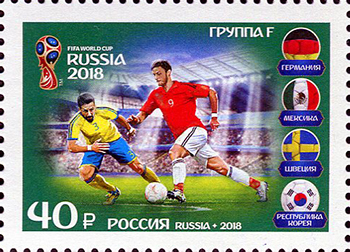
2018 postage stamp from Russia depicting Group F of the 2018 FIFA World Cup group stage.

Group F of the 2018 FIFA World Cup took place from 17 to 27 June 2018. The group consisted of defending champions Germany, Mexico, Sweden, and South Korea. Sweden and Mexico were the top two teams that advanced to the round of 16.

The surprise elimination of holders Germany marked the first time since 1938 that they did not advance beyond the first round, specifically the group stage which was first introduced in 1950. The early German exit was "greeted with shock in newspapers around the world".

== Teams ==
Draw position	Team	Pot	Confederation	Method of qualification	Date of qualification	Finals appearance	Last appearance	Previous best performance	FIFA Rankings	
Draw position	Team	Pot	Confederation	Method of qualification	Date of qualification	Finals appearance	Last appearance	Previous best performance	October 2017 (Note: The rankings of October 2017 were used for seeding for the final draw.)	June 2018
F1	Germany	1	UEFA	UEFA Group C winners	5 October 2017	19th (Note: Germany competed between 1951 and 1990 as West Germany.)	2014 (champions)	Winners (1954, 1974, 1990, 2014)	1	1
F2	Mexico	2	CONCACAF	CONCACAF fifth round winners	1 September 2017	16th	2014 (round of 16)	Quarter-finals (1970, 1986)	16	15
F3	Sweden	3	UEFA	UEFA second round winners	13 November 2017	12th	2006 (round of 16)	Runners-up (1958)	25	24
F4	South Korea	4	AFC	AFC third round Group A runners-up	5 September 2017	10th	2014 (group stage)	Fourth place (2002)	62	57

== Standings ==
Pos	Team	Pld	W	D	L	GF	GA	GD	Pts	Qualification
1	Sweden	3	2	0	1	5	2	+3	6	Advance to knockout stage
2	Mexico	3	2	0	1	3	4	−1	6	Advance to knockout stage
3	South Korea	3	1	0	2	3	3	0	3	
4	Germany	3	1	0	2	2	4	−2	3	

Source: FIFA
Rules for classification: Group stage tiebreakers

In the round of 16:

- The winners of Group F, Sweden, advanced to play the runners-up of Group E, Switzerland.
- The runners-up of Group F, Mexico, advanced to play the winners of Group E, Brazil.

== Matches ==
All times listed are local time.

=== Germany vs Mexico ===
The two teams had faced each other 11 times, including three FIFA World Cup games all of which were German victories: 6–0 in 1978 (first group stage), 2–1 in 1998 (round of 16), but a 1986 quarter-final game being the most significant, which ended with a German penalty shoot-out victory.

Timo Werner fired a warning shot across the face of Guillermo Ochoa's goal during the first minutes of the match. Héctor Moreno headed straight at Manuel Neuer from their clearest opening. Javier Hernández's one-two with Andrés Guardado allowed him to spin away from Mats Hummels just inside the Germany half and feed Hirving Lozano down the left. Lozano then cut inside the resistance offered by the back-tracking Mesut Özil to crash a low right foot shot inside Neuer's right post. However, two minutes later, Toni Kroos's free-kick arrowed towards the top corner. Ochoa denied the midfielder's shot, pushing the ball against the crossbar. Near the end Joshua Kimmich and Werner came close to scoring, but their attempts were unsuccessful. Julian Brandt had one final chance to equalize in the 89th minute, but he hit the post from outside the box.

This defeat represented the first time that Germany had lost the opening game in defence of their trophy. They beat Argentina 3–1 in 1958, drew 0–0 with Poland in 1978, and defeated Bolivia 1–0 in 1994. Germany lost their opening match at a World Cup for only the second time, having done so in 1982, against Algeria. This is the third consecutive World Cup in which the reigning champion has failed to win their opening match – Italy drew 1–1 with Paraguay in 2010, while Spain lost 5–1 against the Netherlands in 2014; and also the fourth champions failed to win their opening match, as France lost 0–1 to Senegal at the 2002 FIFA World Cup (all of whom had been knocked out at the group stage). Germany had 26 shots, the most by a side without scoring in a World Cup fixture since 2006 (Portugal v England, 29 shots in a 0–0 draw). Conversely, Mexico beat Germany for only the second time – their previous only win against them came in a friendly in June 1985. However, Mexico's victory over Germany marked the first time a team from the CONCACAF region defeated Germany in the World Cup, and also the second Mexican win against a World Champion's team in a World Cup after beating France in 2010. Additionally, Mexico became the first team from the Americas to defeat Germany at a World Cup in almost 16 years – the last time Germany lost to either a North- or South-American team was at the 2002 final against Brazil. Rafael Márquez featured in his fifth World Cup finals, becoming just the third player to achieve this feat – along with Mexico's Antonio Carbajal and Germany's Lothar Matthäus.

17 June 2018
18:00 MSK (UTC+3)

Germany	0–1	Mexico
		Lozano 35'

Luzhniki Stadium, Moscow
Attendance: 78,011
Referee: Alireza Faghani (Iran)

Germany	Mexico

GK	1	Manuel Neuer (c)
RB	18	Joshua Kimmich
CB	17	Jérôme Boateng
CB	5	Mats Hummels	(yellow card) 84'
LB	2	Marvin Plattenhardt		(substituted off) 79'
CM	8	Toni Kroos
CM	6	Sami Khedira		(substituted off) 60'
RW	13	Thomas Müller	(yellow card) 83'
AM	10	Mesut Özil
LW	7	Julian Draxler
CF	9	Timo Werner		(substituted off) 86'
Substitutions:
FW	11	Marco Reus		(substituted on) 60'
FW	23	Mario Gómez		(substituted on) 79'
MF	20	Julian Brandt		(substituted on) 86'
Manager:
Joachim Löw

GK	13	Guillermo Ochoa
RB	3	Carlos Salcedo
CB	2	Hugo Ayala
CB	15	Héctor Moreno	(yellow card) 40'
LB	23	Jesús Gallardo
CM	16	Héctor Herrera	(yellow card) 90'
CM	18	Andrés Guardado (c)		(substituted off) 74'
RW	7	Miguel Layún
AM	11	Carlos Vela		(substituted off) 58'
LW	22	Hirving Lozano		(substituted off) 66'
CF	14	Javier Hernández
Substitutions:
DF	21	Edson Álvarez		(substituted on) 58'
FW	9	Raúl Jiménez		(substituted on) 66'
DF	4	Rafael Márquez		(substituted on) 74'
Manager:
(Colombia) Juan Carlos Osorio

Man of the Match:
Hirving Lozano (Mexico)

Assistant referees:
Reza Sokhandan (Iran)
Mohammadreza Mansouri (Iran)
Fourth official:
Mohammed Abdulla Hassan Mohamed (United Arab Emirates)
Reserve assistant referee:
Mohamed Al Hammadi (United Arab Emirates)
Video assistant referee:
Massimiliano Irrati (Italy)
Assistant video assistant referees:
Wilton Sampaio (Brazil)
Carlos Astroza (Chile)
Mark Geiger (United States)

=== Sweden vs South Korea ===
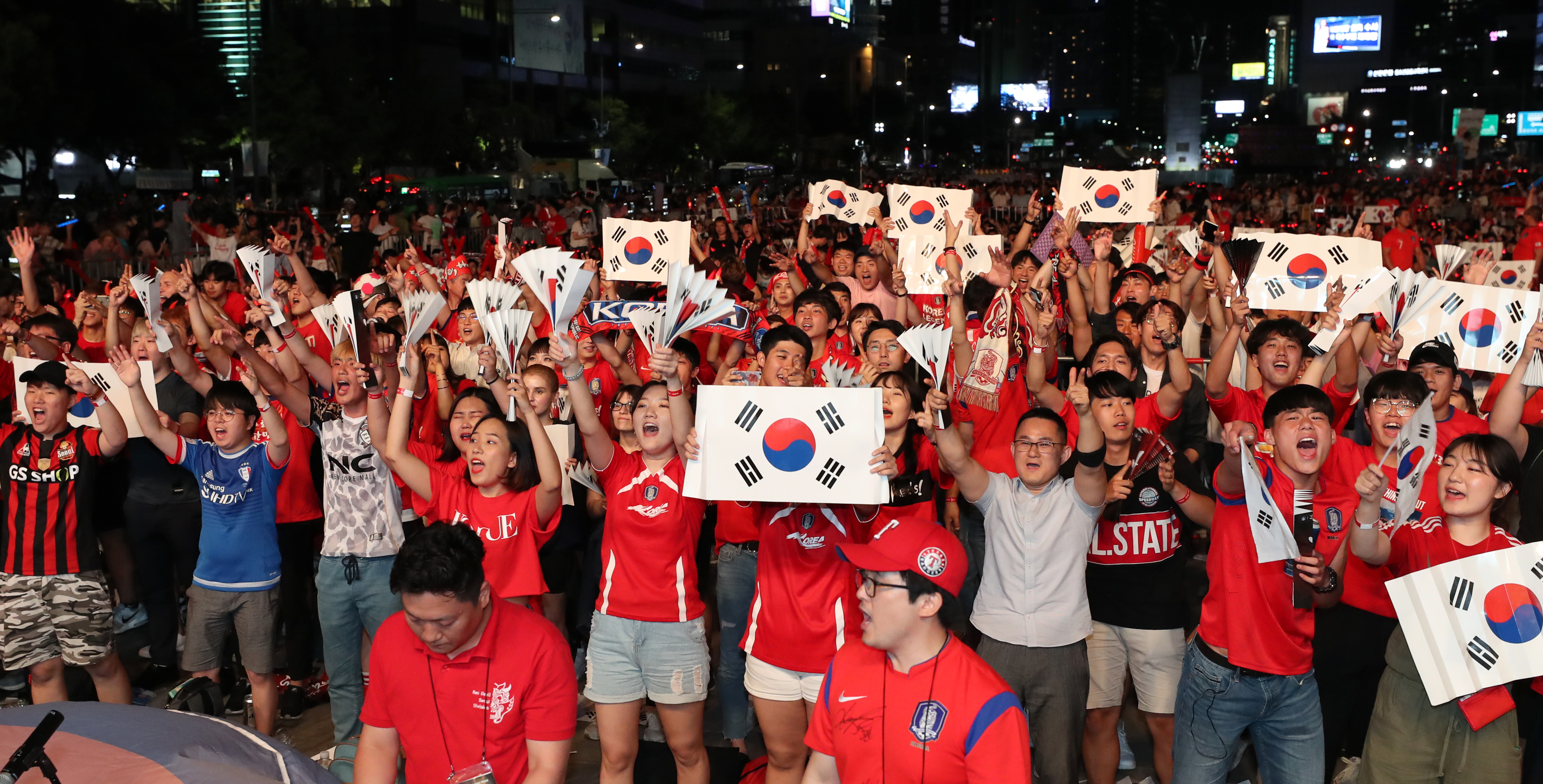
South Korean fans, the "Red Devils", in Seoul

The two teams had faced each other four times, most recently in 2005, a 2–2 draw in a friendly game.

Sweden's defence was tested by a South Korean attack in the early stages. Andreas Granqvist was denied a shot at goal by a last-ditch interception by Kim Young-gwon. Marcus Berg was close to score midway through the first half but his close range shot was beaten away by Jo Hyeon-woo, while South Korea did not manage a single shot on target. Jo also saved from Ola Toivonen's header following a free-kick. In the start to the second half, both sides exchanged chances within the first six minutes. There was a short delay for Kim Min-woo's foul on Viktor Claesson to be analysed on video and for the referee to point to the spot but it did not affect Granqvist, who sent Jo the wrong way. Hwang Hee-chan spurned a glorious opportunity late on, heading wide from 10 yards out, as Sweden ultimately held on for a precious three points.

This was Sweden's first win in their opening match at a World Cup since beating Mexico 3–0 as hosts in 1958. South Korea lost their opening match at a World Cup for the first time since 1998 when they lost 3–1 against Mexico. Sweden's goal was the first they had scored in 402 minutes of international football.

18 June 2018
15:00 MSK (UTC+3)

Sweden	1–0	South Korea
Granqvist 65' (pen.)

Nizhny Novgorod Stadium, Nizhny Novgorod
Attendance: 42,300
Referee: Joel Aguilar (El Salvador)

Sweden	South Korea

GK	1	Robin Olsen
RB	2	Mikael Lustig
CB	18	Pontus Jansson
CB	4	Andreas Granqvist (c)
LB	6	Ludwig Augustinsson
RM	17	Viktor Claesson	(yellow card) 61'
CM	7	Sebastian Larsson		(substituted off) 81'
CM	8	Albin Ekdal		(substituted off) 71'
LM	10	Emil Forsberg
CF	9	Marcus Berg
CF	20	Ola Toivonen		(substituted off) 77'
Substitutions:
MF	15	Oscar Hiljemark		(substituted on) 71'
FW	22	Isaac Kiese Thelin		(substituted on) 77'
MF	13	Gustav Svensson		(substituted on) 81'
Manager:
Janne Andersson

GK	23	Jo Hyeon-woo
RB	2	Lee Yong
CB	20	Jang Hyun-soo
CB	19	Kim Young-gwon
LB	6	Park Joo-ho		(substituted off) 28'
CM	17	Lee Jae-sung
CM	16	Ki Sung-yueng (c)
CM	13	Koo Ja-cheol		(substituted off) 73'
RF	11	Hwang Hee-chan	(yellow card) 55'
CF	9	Kim Shin-wook	(yellow card) 13'	(substituted off) 66'
LF	7	Son Heung-min
Substitutions:
DF	12	Kim Min-woo		(substituted on) 28'
MF	15	Jung Woo-young		(substituted on) 66'
MF	10	Lee Seung-woo		(substituted on) 73'
Manager:
Shin Tae-yong

Man of the Match:
Andreas Granqvist (Sweden)

Assistant referees:
Juan Zumba (El Salvador)
Juan Carlos Mora (Costa Rica)
Fourth official:
Norbert Hauata (Tahiti)
Reserve assistant referee:
Bertrand Brial (New Caledonia)
Video assistant referee:
Mauro Vigliano (Argentina)
Assistant video assistant referees:
Abdulrahman Al-Jassim (Qatar)
Taleb Al Maari (Qatar)
Daniele Orsato (Italy)

=== South Korea vs Mexico ===
The two teams had met in 12 matches, including one game at the 1998 FIFA World Cup group stage, won by Mexico 3–1. The match was attended by the President of South Korea, Moon Jae-in.

In the 12th minute, Hirving Lozano made a block to deny Lee Yong. Nine minutes later, Son Heung-min shot a low drive which Héctor Moreno helped to keep out. Jang Hyun-soo handled Andrés Guardado's cross and the referee awarded a penalty, Carlos Vela stepped up and sent Jo Hyeon-woo the wrong way. Two minutes later, Miguel Layún lashed his effort over from close range. South Korea wanted a penalty of their own after the restart when Moon Seon-min's strike clipped Carlos Salcedo's arm, but the referee waved away their appeals. Jo lunged to his right to tip Javier Hernández's shot wide. Lozano drove into space, Vela drew away to the right as the ball went left to Hernández, who checked back and clipped low past Jo. In the third minute of stoppage time, Son struck from 20-yards into the top-left corner.

Before Son's goal, South Korea had gone 288 minutes without scoring at the World Cup, their longest ever such drought. Hernández scored his 50th goal for Mexico, becoming the inaugural player of the Mexico national team to reach that milestone. Mexico has won consecutive matches at the World Cup starting with their inaugural achievement at the 2002 World Cup. Hernández is the third player to score at three World Cups, preceded by Mexico's Cuauhtémoc Blanco and Rafael Márquez.

23 June 2018
18:00 MSK (UTC+3)

South Korea	1–2	Mexico
Son Heung-min 90+3'		Vela 26' (pen.); Hernández 66'

Rostov Arena, Rostov-on-Don
Attendance: 43,472
Referee: Milorad Mažić (Serbia)

South Korea	Mexico

GK	23	Jo Hyeon-woo
RB	2	Lee Yong	(yellow card) 63'
CB	20	Jang Hyun-soo
CB	19	Kim Young-gwon	(yellow card) 58'
LB	12	Kim Min-woo		(substituted off) 84'
RM	18	Moon Seon-min		(substituted off) 77'
CM	8	Ju Se-jong		(substituted off) 64'
CM	16	Ki Sung-yueng (c)
LM	11	Hwang Hee-chan
CF	17	Lee Jae-sung
CF	7	Son Heung-min
Substitutions:
MF	10	Lee Seung-woo	(yellow card) 72'	(substituted on) 64'
MF	15	Jung Woo-young	(yellow card) 80'	(substituted on) 77'
DF	14	Hong Chul		(substituted on) 84'
Manager:
Shin Tae-yong

GK	13	Guillermo Ochoa
RB	21	Edson Álvarez
CB	3	Carlos Salcedo
CB	15	Héctor Moreno
LB	23	Jesús Gallardo
CM	7	Miguel Layún
CM	16	Héctor Herrera
CM	18	Andrés Guardado (c)	(substituted off) 68'
RF	11	Carlos Vela	(substituted off) 77'
CF	14	Javier Hernández
LF	22	Hirving Lozano	(substituted off) 71'
Substitutions:
DF	4	Rafael Márquez	(substituted on) 68'
MF	17	Jesús Manuel Corona	(substituted on) 71'
MF	10	Giovani dos Santos	(substituted on) 77'
Manager:
(Colombia) Juan Carlos Osorio

Man of the Match:
Javier Hernández (Mexico)

Assistant referees:
Milovan Ristić (Serbia)
Dalibor Đurđević (Serbia)
Fourth official:
John Pitti (Panama)
Reserve assistant referee:
Gabriel Victoria (Panama)
Video assistant referee:
Daniele Orsato (Italy)
Assistant video assistant referees:
Artur Soares Dias (Portugal)
Carlos Astroza (Chile)
Tiago Martins (Portugal)

=== Germany vs Sweden ===
The two teams had met in 36 previous matches, including four FIFA World Cup games, the latest of these being a 2–0 Germany win in the 2006 World Cup round of 16.

Julian Draxler had a shot blocked from close range before he toe-poked a left-footed effort narrowly wide from a tight angle soon after. Sebastian Rudy left the field with a bloody nose after a collision with Ola Toivonen moments before he burst into the box to control a Viktor Claesson cross on his chest and lift his shot over Manuel Neuer into the far corner of the net. Three minutes into the second half, Germany drew level when Timo Werner's cross found Marco Reus, who met it with his knee and turned the ball into the bottom corner of the net. With just under 10 minutes left, Jérôme Boateng was dismissed after picking up a second yellow card for a tackle on Marcus Berg, and Neuer then made a one-handed save to deny substitute John Guidetti from a downward header. Toni Kroos tapped a free-kick short to Reus before sweeping the return pass into the top right corner from left of the penalty area with his right foot.

Kroos' goal in (94.39) is the latest winner ever scored on the World Cup stage. The previous record belonged to Francesco Totti, who found the net late on (94.26) against Australia in 2006. Germany came from behind at half-time to win a World Cup match for the first time since 1974 – which was also against Sweden (0–1 at HT, won 4–2). Sweden have lost a World Cup group-stage match for the first time since June 1990, when they lost to Costa Rica – this defeat ends a run of 10 group games unbeaten. Boateng is the first player to be sent off at the World Cup for Germany since Miroslav Klose in 2010 against Serbia.

23 June 2018
21:00 MSK (UTC+3)

Germany	2–1	Sweden
Reus 48'; Kroos 90+5'		Toivonen 32'

Fisht Olympic Stadium, Sochi
Attendance: 44,287
Referee: Szymon Marciniak (Poland)

Germany	Sweden

GK	1	Manuel Neuer (c)
RB	18	Joshua Kimmich
CB	16	Antonio Rüdiger
CB	17	Jérôme Boateng	(yellow card) 71' (yellow-red card) 82'
LB	3	Jonas Hector		(substituted off) 87'
CM	19	Sebastian Rudy		(substituted off) 31'
CM	8	Toni Kroos
RW	13	Thomas Müller
AM	7	Julian Draxler		(substituted off) 46'
LW	11	Marco Reus
CF	9	Timo Werner
Substitutions:
MF	21	İlkay Gündoğan		(substituted on) 31'
FW	23	Mario Gómez		(substituted on) 46'
MF	20	Julian Brandt		(substituted on) 87'
Manager:
Joachim Löw

GK	1	Robin Olsen
RB	2	Mikael Lustig
CB	3	Victor Lindelöf
CB	4	Andreas Granqvist (c)
LB	6	Ludwig Augustinsson
RM	17	Viktor Claesson		(substituted off) 74'
CM	7	Sebastian Larsson	(yellow card) 90+7'
CM	8	Albin Ekdal	(yellow card) 52'
LM	10	Emil Forsberg
CF	9	Marcus Berg		(substituted off) 90'
CF	20	Ola Toivonen		(substituted off) 78'
Substitutions:
MF	21	Jimmy Durmaz		(substituted on) 74'
FW	11	John Guidetti		(substituted on) 78'
FW	22	Isaac Kiese Thelin		(substituted on) 90'
Manager:
Janne Andersson

Man of the Match:
Marco Reus (Germany)

Assistant referees:
Paweł Sokolnicki (Poland)
Tomasz Listkiewicz (Poland)
Fourth official:
Ryuji Sato (Japan)
Reserve assistant referee:
Toru Sagara (Japan)
Video assistant referee:
Clément Turpin (France)
Assistant video assistant referees:
Paweł Gil (Poland)
Cyril Gringore (France)
Paolo Valeri (Italy)

=== South Korea vs Germany ===
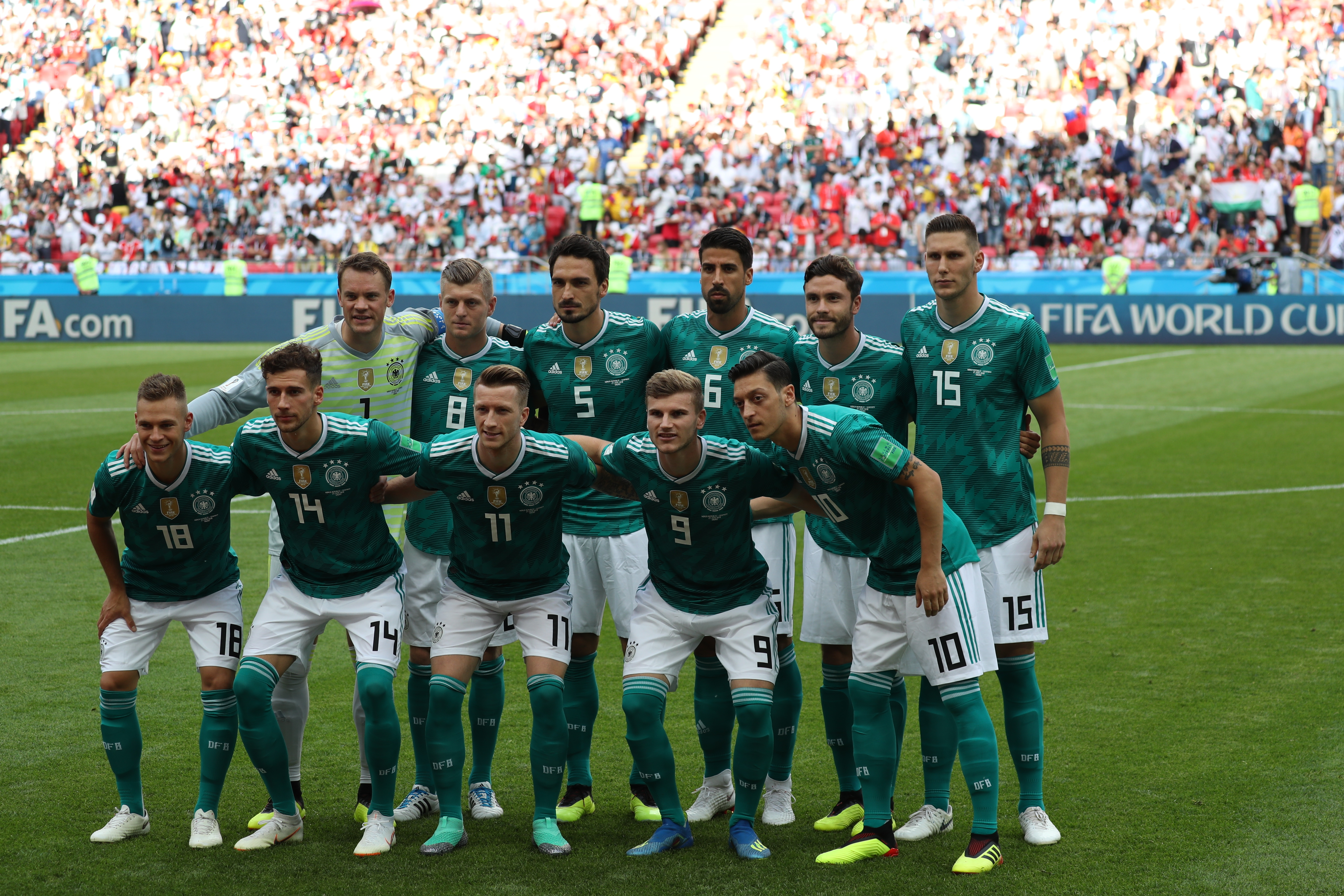
The German team.

The two teams had faced each other three times, including two FIFA World Cup games, one at the 1994 FIFA World Cup group stage, a Germany 3–2 victory. and one at the 2002 FIFA World Cup semi-finals, which ended with a 1–0 victory for Germany, and despite South Korea's two previous losses, they were not eliminated just yet.

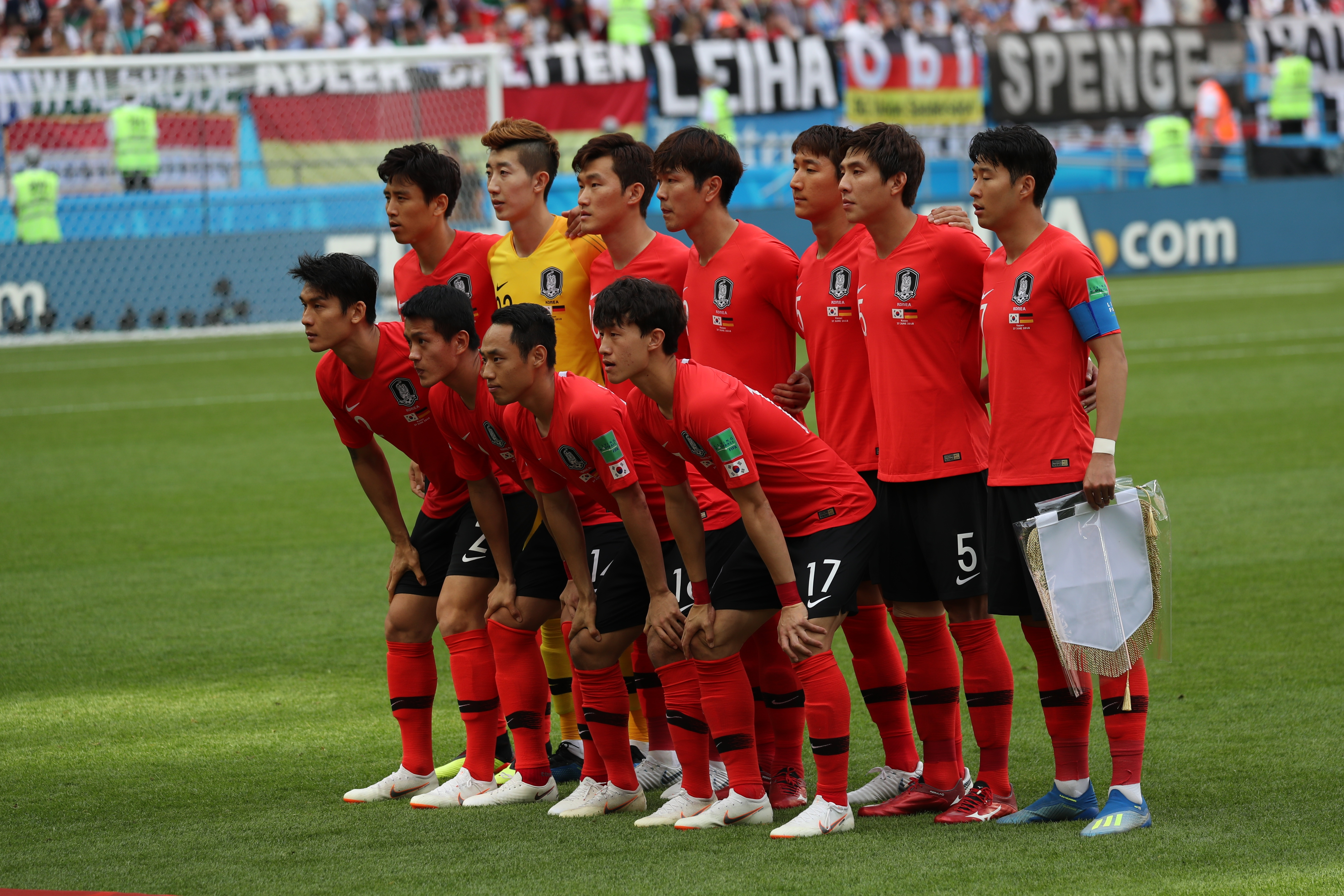
The South Korean team.

For South Korea to have any chance of advancing, Mexico would have to defeat Sweden in their match that same day, and South Korea would then have to defeat Germany by at least two goals, a feat predicted to be highly improbable going in, with the South Korean coach before the game predicting that it had a "one percent" chance of happening.

Son Heung-min shot wide from the edge of the penalty area before Marco Reus shot one towards goal at the other end only to see it blocked. Leon Goretzka drew a one-handed save from Jo Hyeon-woo with a header from the middle of the penalty area, the South Korean goalkeeper diving to his right and pushing the ball away at full stretch. Two minutes into the second-half's stoppage time, Son's corner from the left reached Kim Young-gwon at the far post who scored into the right corner from six yards out with his left foot, the offside decision that followed was overruled by a VAR decision. Ju Se-jong won the ball off Manuel Neuer who had been at the other end of the pitch in order to join the German attack, thus leaving the goal undefended, and hit a long ball to Son, who ran onto the ball and tapped into an empty net from close range to score the second. Had Mexico defeated Sweden in their final group stage match that same day, a South Korean victory over Germany by at least two goals would have advanced South Korea to the round of 16 based on goal differential, at the expense of Sweden. However, since Sweden defeated Mexico 3–0, the South Koreans were eliminated despite their 2–0 victory over Germany. This marked the second time that South Korea failed to qualify for the knockout stage in consecutive World Cups, having been eliminated in the group stage at the previous tournament and in four consecutive World Cups from 1986 to 1998.

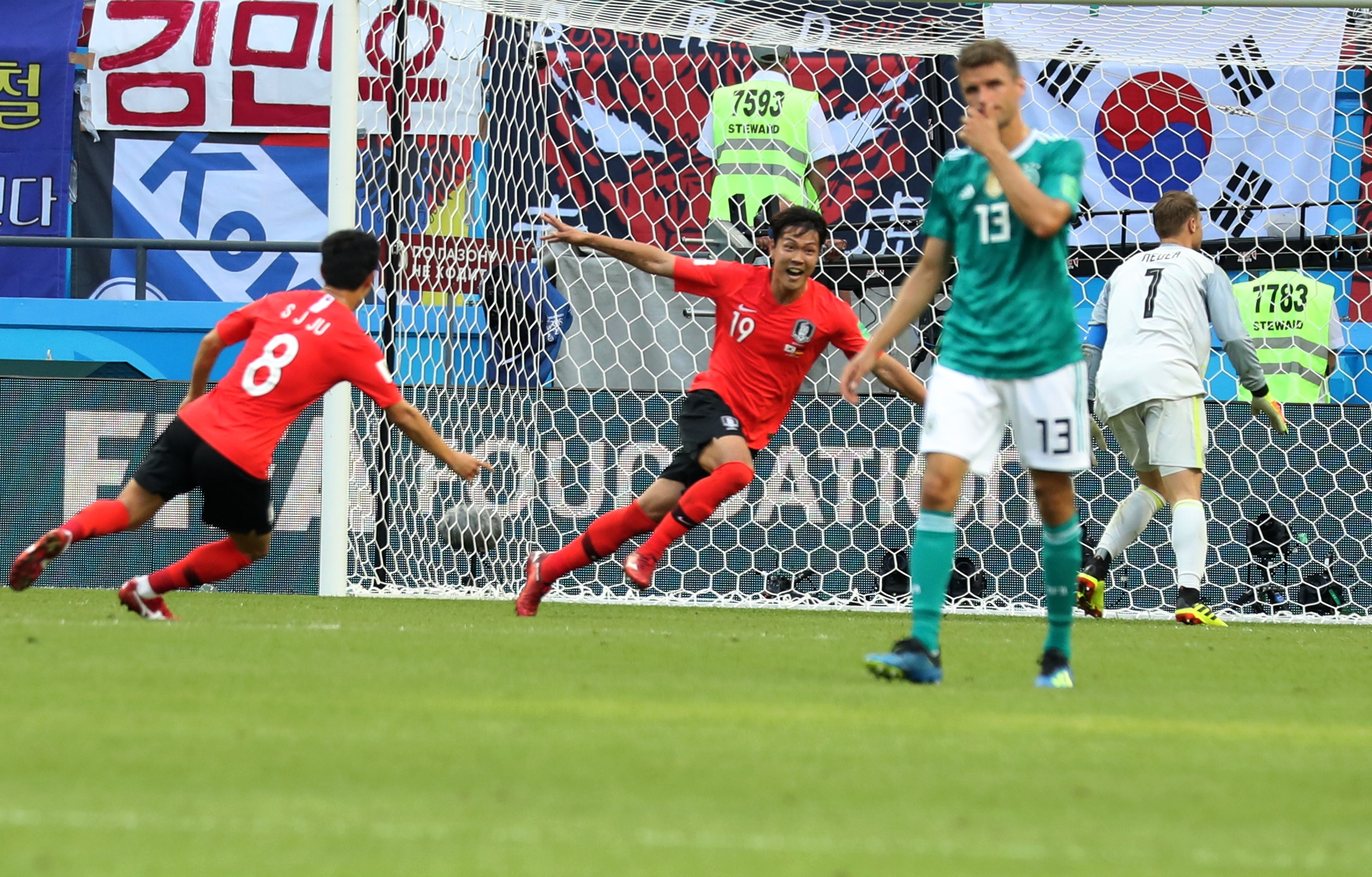
Goal for South Korea.

Germany were the fourth defending champions to be eliminated from the group stage at the World Cup in the last five tournaments, following France in 2002, Italy in 2010, and Spain in 2014; and since the new millennium, all champions eliminated in the group stage had been UEFA members. This was only the second time that Germany had been eliminated from the first round at the World Cup, having done so in 1938, while also being the first time since then that Germany failed to finish among the best eight teams of the tournament. However, this was the first time it happened after the first round was converted back to a group stage format in 1950. This was Germany's first ever defeat against an Asian nation in a World Cup match in what was their sixth such match, and also the first time that Germany suffered two defeats in a same World Cup since 2010 (in which Germany lost by 1–0 for Serbia in group stage and also by 1–0 for Spain in the semi-finals). This was South Korea's first victory (and clean sheet) at the World Cup since their 2–0 win over Greece in 2010. Son's goal for South Korea (95:52) was the latest goal Germany had ever conceded in a 90-minute World Cup match. This was also the first time Germany finished bottom in the World Cup's group stage, one of the worst performances in their history; having been eliminated from the group stage of UEFA Euro 2000 and 2004. South Korea's win also meant that Australia was the only team from the Asian Football Confederation that failed to win a game in their 2018 World Cup campaign. Germany would also suffer the same fate again 4 years later in 2022, this time finishing 3rd of their group stage.

27 June 2018
17:00 MSK (UTC+3)

South Korea	2–0	Germany
Kim Young-gwon 90+2'; Son Heung-min 90+6'

Kazan Arena, Kazan
Attendance: 41,835
Referee: Mark Geiger (United States)

South Korea	Germany

GK	23	Jo Hyeon-woo
RB	2	Lee Yong
CB	5	Yun Young-sun
CB	19	Kim Young-gwon
LB	14	Hong Chul
RM	17	Lee Jae-sung	(yellow card) 23'
CM	15	Jung Woo-young	(yellow card) 9'
CM	20	Jang Hyun-soo
LM	18	Moon Seon-min	(yellow card) 48'	(substituted off) 69'
CF	13	Koo Ja-cheol		(substituted off) 56'
CF	7	Son Heung-min (c)	(yellow card) 65'
Substitutions:
FW	11	Hwang Hee-chan		(substituted on) 56'	(substituted off) 79'
MF	8	Ju Se-jong		(substituted on) 69'
DF	22	Go Yo-han		(substituted on) 79'
Manager:
Shin Tae-yong

GK	1	Manuel Neuer (c)
RB	18	Joshua Kimmich
CB	5	Mats Hummels
CB	15	Niklas Süle
LB	3	Jonas Hector	(substituted off) 78'
CM	6	Sami Khedira	(substituted off) 58'
CM	8	Toni Kroos
RW	14	Leon Goretzka	(substituted off) 63'
AM	10	Mesut Özil
LW	11	Marco Reus
CF	9	Timo Werner
Substitutions:
FW	23	Mario Gómez	(substituted on) 58'
FW	13	Thomas Müller	(substituted on) 63'
MF	20	Julian Brandt	(substituted on) 78'
Manager:
Joachim Löw

Man of the Match:
Jo Hyeon-woo (South Korea)

Assistant referees:
Joe Fletcher (Canada)
Frank Anderson (United States)
Fourth official:
Julio Bascuñán (Chile)
Reserve assistant referee:
Christian Schiemann (Chile)
Video assistant referee:
Danny Makkelie (Netherlands)
Assistant video assistant referees:
Tiago Martins (Portugal)
Corey Rockwell (United States)
Artur Soares Dias (Portugal)

=== Mexico vs Sweden ===
The two teams had met in nine previous matches, including a 1958 FIFA World Cup group stage match won by Sweden 3–0.

Sweden got the breakthrough five minutes into the second half, Ludwig Augustinsson volleyed past Guillermo Ochoa when Viktor Claesson's mishit sat him up. The referee pointed to the spot when Héctor Moreno slid in on Marcus Berg and Andreas Granqvist shot into the top-left corner. In the 74th minute, substitute Isaac Kiese Thelin flicked on a long throw-in before Edson Álvarez accidentally hit the ball into his own net with his left thigh.

Mexico qualify for the knockout stages for the seventh consecutive World Cup despite this defeat thanks to South Korea's 2–0 victory over Germany. This was Sweden's biggest win in a World Cup match since they defeated Bulgaria 4–0 in 1994 in the match for third place. Granqvist became the first Swedish player to score two or more goals in a single World Cup tournament since Henrik Larsson in 2002. This was Mexico's worst defeat at the World Cup since they were beaten 6–0 by Germany in 1978. Jesús Gallardo was shown a yellow card after just 15 seconds in this game – the quickest anyone has ever been booked in the World Cup.

27 June 2018
19:00 YEKT (UTC+5)

Mexico	0–3	Sweden
		Augustinsson 50'; Granqvist 62' (pen.); Álvarez 74' (o.g.)

Central Stadium, Yekaterinburg
Attendance: 33,061
Referee: Néstor Pitana (Argentina)

Mexico	Sweden

GK	13	Guillermo Ochoa
RB	21	Edson Álvarez
CB	3	Carlos Salcedo
CB	15	Héctor Moreno	(yellow card) 61'
LB	23	Jesús Gallardo	(yellow card) 1'	(substituted off) 65'
CM	18	Andrés Guardado (c)		(substituted off) 75'
CM	16	Héctor Herrera
RW	7	Miguel Layún	(yellow card) 86'	(substituted off) 89'
AM	11	Carlos Vela
LW	22	Hirving Lozano
CF	14	Javier Hernández
Substitutions:
MF	8	Marco Fabián		(substituted on) 65'
MF	17	Jesús Manuel Corona		(substituted on) 75'
FW	19	Oribe Peralta		(substituted on) 89'
Manager:
(Colombia) Juan Carlos Osorio

GK	1	Robin Olsen
RB	2	Mikael Lustig	(yellow card) 88'
CB	3	Victor Lindelöf
CB	4	Andreas Granqvist (c)
LB	6	Ludwig Augustinsson
RM	17	Viktor Claesson
CM	7	Sebastian Larsson	(yellow card) 26'	(substituted off) 57'
CM	8	Albin Ekdal		(substituted off) 80'
LM	10	Emil Forsberg
CF	9	Marcus Berg		(substituted off) 68'
CF	20	Ola Toivonen
Substitutions:
MF	13	Gustav Svensson		(substituted on) 57'
FW	22	Isaac Kiese Thelin		(substituted on) 68'
MF	15	Oscar Hiljemark		(substituted on) 80'
Manager:
Janne Andersson

Man of the Match:
Ludwig Augustinsson (Sweden)

Assistant referees:
Hernán Maidana (Argentina)
Juan Pablo Belatti (Argentina)
Fourth official:
Andrés Cunha (Uruguay)
Reserve assistant referee:
Mauricio Espinosa (Uruguay)
Video assistant referee:
Mauro Vigliano (Argentina)
Assistant video assistant referees:
Gery Vargas (Bolivia)
Carlos Astroza (Chile)
Wilton Sampaio (Brazil)

== Discipline ==
Fair play points would have been used as tiebreakers if the overall and head-to-head records of teams were tied. These were calculated based on yellow and red cards received in all group matches as follows:

- first yellow card: minus 1 point;
- indirect red card (second yellow card): minus 3 points;
- direct red card: minus 4 points;
- yellow card and direct red card: minus 5 points;

Only one of the above deductions were applied to a player in a single match.

Team	Match 1				Match 2				Match 3				Points
Team	Yellow card	(yellow card) (yellow-red card)	Red card	(yellow card) (red card)	Yellow card	(yellow card) (yellow-red card)	Red card	(yellow card) (red card)	Yellow card	(yellow card) (yellow-red card)	Red card	(yellow card) (red card)	Points
Sweden	1				2				2				−5
Mexico	2								3				−5
Germany	2					1							−5
South Korea	2				4				4				−10

== See also ==
- Germany at the FIFA World Cup
- Mexico at the FIFA World Cup
- South Korea at the FIFA World Cup
- Sweden at the FIFA World Cup
