= Joe Fletcher (referee) =

Canadian soccer referee (born 1976)

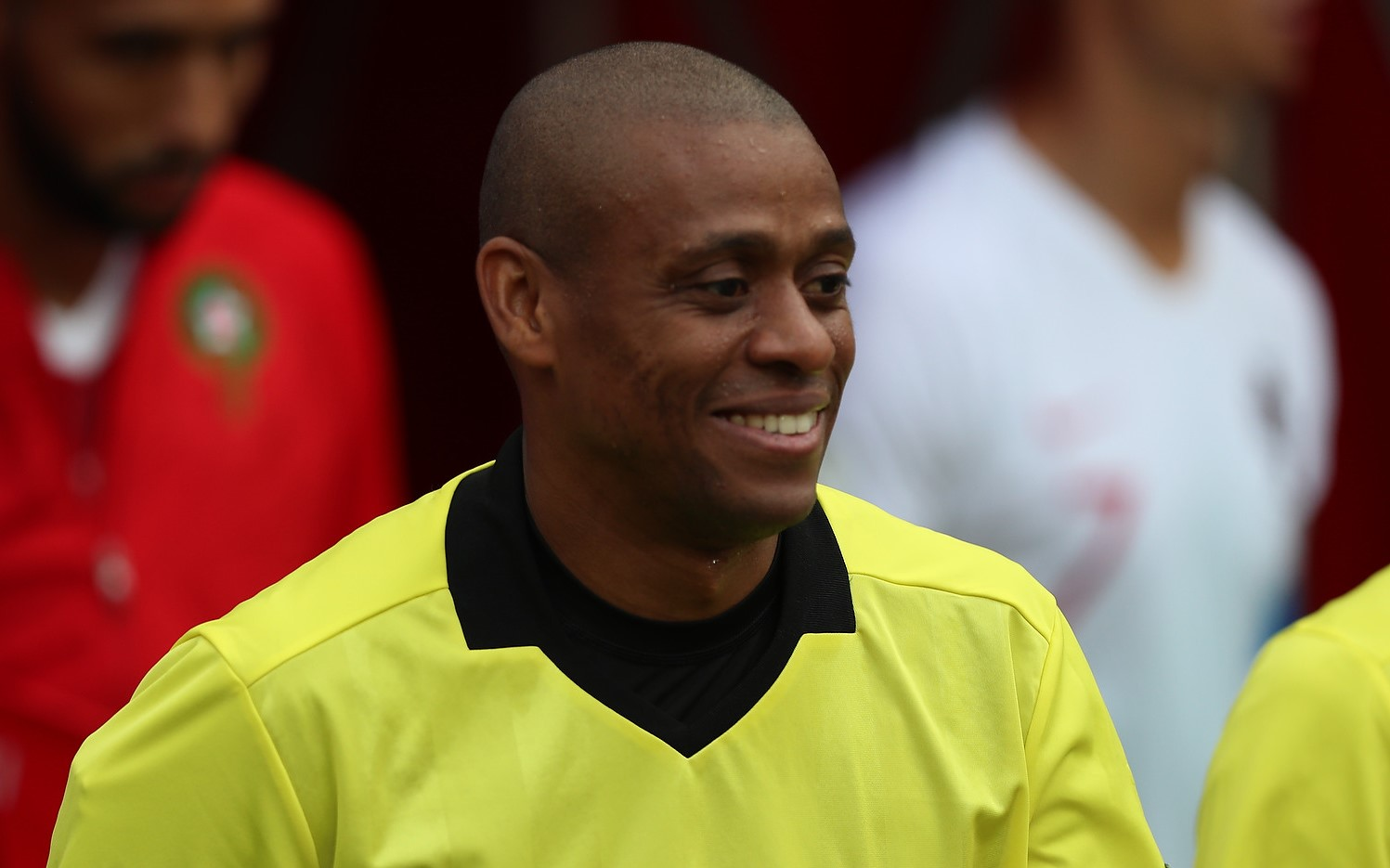
- Fletcher in 2018
- Full name: Joseph Wiltshire Fletcher
- Born: September 10, 1976 (age 50); Niagara Falls, Ontario
- Height: 1.83 m (6 ft 0 in)
- Other occupation: Chartered accountant; PRO's Chief Refereeing Officer

Domestic
Years	League	Role
1999–2007	CPSL/CSL	Referee
2014–2019	MLS	Referee
2015	NASL	Assistant referee
2017	USLC	Assistant referee

International
Years	League	Role
2007–2019	FIFA listed	Referee

Joe Fletcher (born September 10, 1976) is a Canadian former soccer referee from Niagara Falls, Ontario. He is currently the chief refereeing officer for the Professional Referee Organization.

Fletcher is also known in accounting circles as a Chartered Professional Accountant who had his designation revoked by CPA Canada in 2020. Fletcher was disciplined for improperly taking $14.2 million in loans from his clients and falsifying documents to cover up his misconduct.

== Career ==
Fletcher initially began officiating in 1999 in the Canadian Professional Soccer League, after receiving the opportunity from Tony Camacho then the CPSL Director of Officials.

When the 2007 FIFA U-20 World Cup was held that summer in Canada, he was selected to be one of the tournament's assistant referees. In 2007, he officiated the 2007 Open Canada Cup finals match. He was also voted the CSL Referee of the Year in 2007. In 2012, the Canadian Soccer Association (CSA) selected Fletcher as the recipient for the Ray Morgan Memorial Award, and the Canada Soccer International Achievement Award in 2015.

In 2018, he was voted MLS assistant referee of the year. On January 18, 2019, he retired from officiating and served as a referee instructor for the CSA. In January 2020, he was named the manager of senior assistant referees for the Professional Referee Organization (PRO).

Outside of soccer, Fletcher was a CPA. In 2020, Fletcher was suspended by the Chartered Professional Accountants of Ontario for misconduct, after having been found to have improperly borrowed money from clients and falsified audits to hide the trail.

=== World Cup ===
He was selected as an assistant referee for the 2014 FIFA World Cup.

In 2018, Fletcher was selected to be an assistant referee at the 2018 FIFA World Cup in Russia, his second World Cup appointment. He was an assistant video assistant referee for the Argentina vs Iceland and Uruguay vs Portugal games. He was also an assistant referee for the Portugal vs Morocco, South Korea vs Germany and the knockout stage match Colombia vs England.

== Honours ==
- Ray Morgan Memorial Award: 2012, 2019
