= 2018 FIFA World Cup Group E =

Football tournament

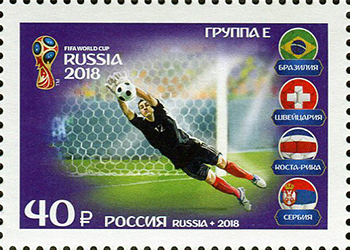
2018 postage stamp from Russia depicting Group E of the 2018 FIFA World Cup group stage.

Group E of the 2018 FIFA World Cup took place from 17 to 27 June 2018. The group consisted of Brazil, Switzerland, Costa Rica, and Serbia. The top two teams, Brazil and Switzerland, advanced to the round of 16.

Brazil, Serbia, and Switzerland played in the same group at the following FIFA World Cup.

== Teams ==
Draw position	Team	Pot	Confederation	Method of qualification	Date of qualification	Finals appearance	Last appearance	Previous best performance	FIFA Rankings	
Draw position	Team	Pot	Confederation	Method of qualification	Date of qualification	Finals appearance	Last appearance	Previous best performance	October 2017 (Note: The rankings of October 2017 were used for seeding for the final draw.)	June 2018
E1	Brazil	1	CONMEBOL	CONMEBOL Round Robin winners	28 March 2017	21st	2014 (fourth place)	Winners (1958, 1962, 1970, 1994, 2002)	2	2
E2	Switzerland	2	UEFA	UEFA second round winners	12 November 2017	11th	2014 (round of 16)	Quarter-finals (1934, 1938, 1954)	11	6
E3	Costa Rica	3	CONCACAF	CONCACAF fifth round runners-up	7 October 2017	5th	2014 (quarter-finals)	Quarter-finals (2014)	22	23
E4	Serbia	4	UEFA	UEFA Group D winners	9 October 2017	12th (Note: This is the 2nd appearance of Serbia at the FIFA World Cup. However, FIFA considers Serbia as the successor team of Yugoslavia, who qualified on 8 occasions, and Serbia and Montenegro, who qualified on 2 occasions.)	2010 (group stage)	Fourth place (1930, 1962) (Note: Serbia's best result is group stage in 2010. However, FIFA considers Serbia as the successor team of Yugoslavia.)	38	34

== Standings ==
Pos	Team	Pld	W	D	L	GF	GA	GD	Pts	Qualification
1	Brazil	3	2	1	0	5	1	+4	7	Advance to knockout stage
2	Switzerland	3	1	2	0	5	4	+1	5	Advance to knockout stage
3	Serbia	3	1	0	2	2	4	−2	3	
4	Costa Rica	3	0	1	2	2	5	−3	1	

Source: FIFA
Rules for classification: Group stage tiebreakers

In the round of 16:

- The winners of Group E, Brazil, advanced to play the runners-up of Group F, Mexico.
- The runners-up of Group E, Switzerland, advanced to play the winners of Group F, Sweden.

== Matches ==
All times listed are local time.

=== Costa Rica vs Serbia ===
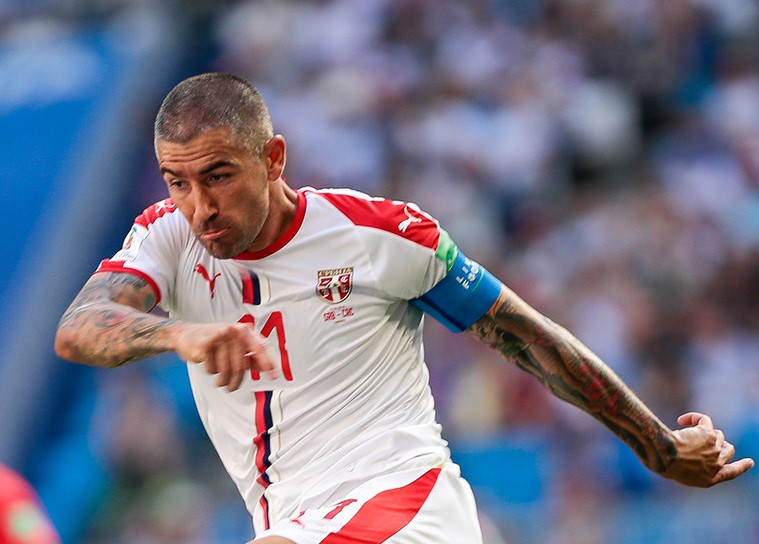
Aleksandar Kolarov scored the lone goal and won the Man of the Match award

The two teams had never met before.

Both defences were tested in the opening moments - Aleksandar Mitrović seeing an effort hooked off the line before Giancarlo González headed straight at Vladimir Stojković at the other end. The Serbian team was almost punished for their lack of penetration when Francisco Calvo dragged a strike wide as Costa Rica enjoyed a short spell of possession just before the break. Aleksandar Kolarov’s left-footed free kick from the right flew into the top right corner. Serbia's Nemanja Matić, meanwhile, was involved in a confrontation with a member of the Costa Rica coaching staff in injury time as he tried to retrieve the ball after it went out of play.

Serbia have won their opening game at a World Cup tournament for the first time since 1998, when they did so as Yugoslavia against Iran (1–0). Costa Rica suffered their first defeat at the World Cup since 2006 (1–2 v Poland), ending a run of five games unbeaten in the competition (W2 D3). Kolarov's strike was the first direct free-kick scored by a Serbia/Yugoslavia player at a World Cup tournament since 1998, when Siniša Mihajlović netted against Iran. Kolarov's goal for Serbia was the third direct free-kick scored at this year's World Cup (after Russia's Aleksandr Golovin and Portugal's Cristiano Ronaldo), which is already as many as there were in the entire 2014 tournament in Brazil.

17 June 2018
16:00 SAMT (UTC+4)

Costa Rica	0–1	Serbia
		Kolarov 56'

Cosmos Arena, Samara
Attendance: 41,432
Referee: Malang Diedhiou (Senegal)

Costa Rica	Serbia

GK	1	Keylor Navas
SW	3	Giancarlo González
CB	2	Jhonny Acosta
CB	6	Óscar Duarte
RWB	16	Cristian Gamboa
LWB	15	Francisco Calvo	(yellow card) 22'
CM	20	David Guzmán	(yellow card) 56'	(substituted off) 73'
CM	5	Celso Borges
RW	11	Johan Venegas		(substituted off) 60'
LW	10	Bryan Ruiz (c)
CF	21	Marco Ureña		(substituted off) 66'
Substitutions:
MF	7	Christian Bolaños		(substituted on) 60'
FW	12	Joel Campbell		(substituted on) 66'
MF	9	Daniel Colindres		(substituted on) 73'
Manager:
Óscar Ramírez

GK	1	Vladimir Stojković
RB	6	Branislav Ivanović	(yellow card) 59'
CB	15	Nikola Milenković
CB	3	Duško Tošić
LB	11	Aleksandar Kolarov (c)
CM	21	Nemanja Matić
CM	4	Luka Milivojević
RW	10	Dušan Tadić		(substituted off) 83'
AM	20	Sergej Milinković-Savić
LW	22	Adem Ljajić		(substituted off) 70'
CF	9	Aleksandar Mitrović		(substituted off) 90'
Substitutions:
MF	17	Filip Kostić		(substituted on) 70'
DF	2	Antonio Rukavina		(substituted on) 83'
FW	8	Aleksandar Prijović	(yellow card) 90+8'	(substituted on) 90'
Manager:
Mladen Krstajić

Man of the Match:
Aleksandar Kolarov (Serbia)

Assistant referees:
Djibril Camara (Senegal)
El Hadji Samba (Senegal)
Fourth official:
Bamlak Tessema Weyesa (Ethiopia)
Reserve assistant referee:
Tikhon Kalugin (Russia)
Video assistant referee:
Clément Turpin (France)
Assistant video assistant referees:
Paweł Gil (Poland)
Cyril Gringore (France)
Artur Soares Dias (Portugal)

=== Brazil vs Switzerland ===
The two teams had met in eight matches, including one game at the 1950 FIFA World Cup group stage, a 2–2 draw.

Paulinho's close-range effort forced Yann Sommer into a save. The first goal was scored shortly after when Philippe Coutinho scored from outside the penalty area with a right foot shot. Brazil also came close before the break as Thiago Silva headed inches over the crossbar. Five minutes into the second half, Steven Zuber equalised with a controversial header after a corner from the right decided by VAR review when he appeared to push Miranda in the back. More controversy was caused in the 73rd minute, after Gabriel Jesus was denied a penalty after being hacked down by Manuel Akanji in the penalty area. Brazil came close several times during the closing minutes, but Neymar, Roberto Firmino, and Miranda were unable to garner goals.

Brazil have failed to win any of their last three World Cup matches (D1 L2), their worst winless run since June 1978, when they went four games without a win. Valon Behrami is the first Switzerland player in history to appear at four World Cups. Brazil failed to win their opening match at the World Cup for the first time since 1978, when they drew 1–1 with Sweden.

17 June 2018
21:00 MSK (UTC+3)

Brazil	1–1	Switzerland
Coutinho 20'		Zuber 50'

Rostov Arena, Rostov-on-Don
Attendance: 43,109
Referee: César Arturo Ramos (Mexico)

Brazil	Switzerland

GK	1	Alisson
RB	14	Danilo
CB	2	Thiago Silva
CB	3	Miranda
LB	12	Marcelo (c)
CM	5	Casemiro	(yellow card) 47'	(substituted off) 60'
CM	15	Paulinho		(substituted off) 67'
RW	19	Willian
AM	11	Philippe Coutinho
LW	10	Neymar
CF	9	Gabriel Jesus		(substituted off) 79'
Substitutions:
MF	17	Fernandinho		(substituted on) 60'
MF	8	Renato Augusto		(substituted on) 67'
FW	20	Roberto Firmino		(substituted on) 79'
Manager:
Tite

GK	1	Yann Sommer
RB	2	Stephan Lichtsteiner (c)	(yellow card) 31'	(substituted off) 87'
CB	22	Fabian Schär	(yellow card) 65'
CB	5	Manuel Akanji
LB	13	Ricardo Rodriguez
CM	11	Valon Behrami	(yellow card) 68'	(substituted off) 71'
CM	10	Granit Xhaka
RW	23	Xherdan Shaqiri
AM	15	Blerim Džemaili
LW	14	Steven Zuber
CF	9	Haris Seferovic		(substituted off) 80'
Substitutions:
MF	17	Denis Zakaria		(substituted on) 71'
FW	7	Breel Embolo		(substituted on) 80'
DF	6	Michael Lang		(substituted on) 87'
Manager:
Vladimir Petković

Man of the Match:
Philippe Coutinho (Brazil)

Assistant referees:
Marvin Torrentera (Mexico)
Miguel Hernández (Mexico)
Fourth official:
John Pitti (Panama)
Reserve assistant referee:
Gabriel Victoria (Panama)
Video assistant referee:
Paolo Valeri (Italy)
Assistant video assistant referees:
Mauro Vigliano (Argentina)
Elenito Di Liberatore (Italy)
Gianluca Rocchi (Italy)

=== Brazil vs Costa Rica ===
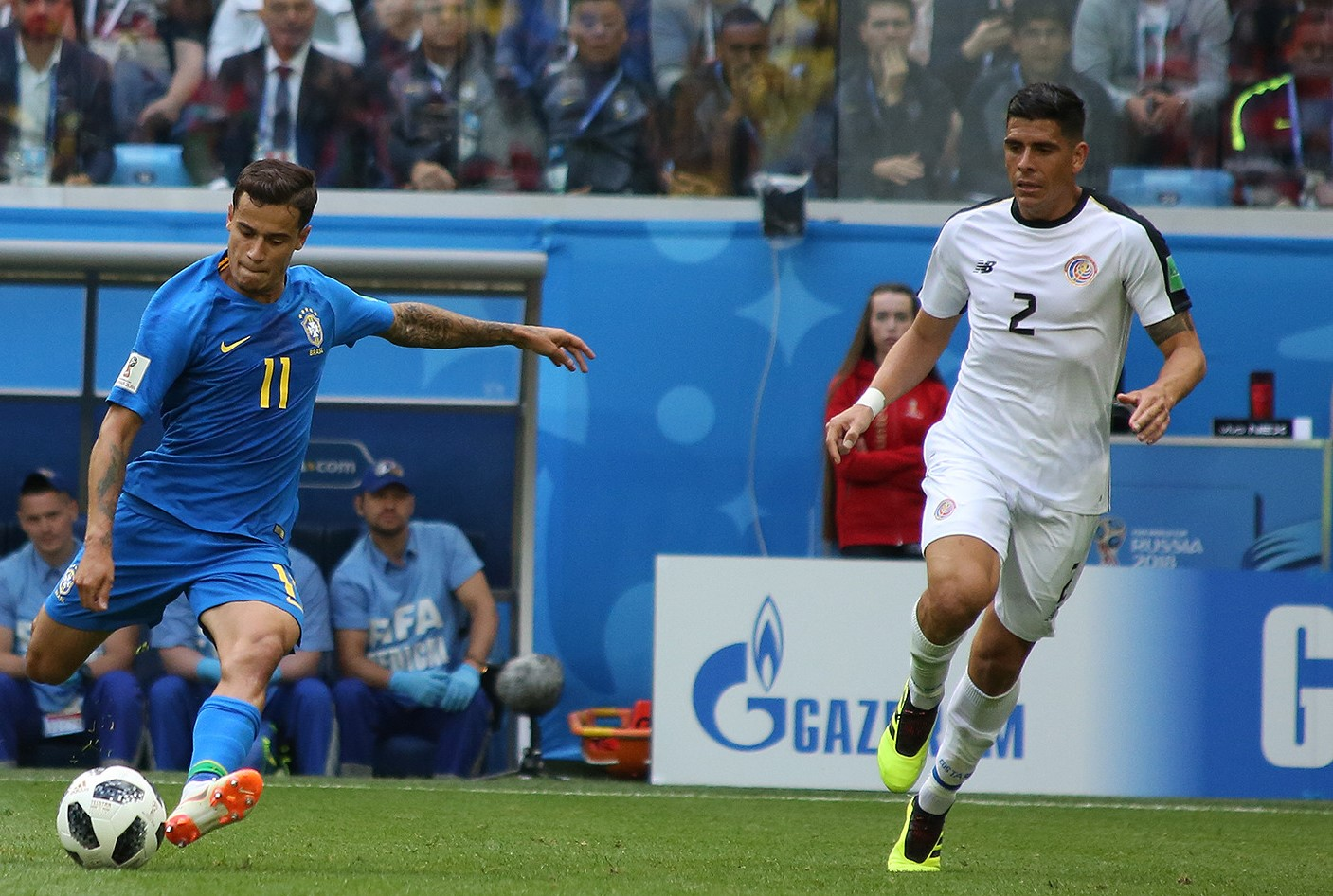
Goalscorer and Man of the Match Philippe Coutinho, followed by Johnny Acosta

The two teams had met in ten matches, including two games at the FIFA World Cup's group stages, in 1990 and 2002, with both ending in a victory for Brazil's (1–0 and 5–2, respectively).

Celso Borges shot an effort wide of the target from a Cristian Gamboa cutback after 13 minutes. Gabriel Jesus shot into the back of the net from an offside position in the 25th minute. Marcelo shot a low drive five minutes from the break, which Keylor Navas stopped. After the break, Jesus headed against the crossbar before Navas diverted Philippe Coutinho's follow-up wide. Neymar curled around the right-hand post from 18 yards in the 72nd minute, before the officials arrived at the correct decision via VAR to deny him a penalty. Coutinho gave Brazil the lead in the 91st minute, when he burst into the box to get on the end of a Roberto Firmino nod down and a touch from Jesus before poking the ball low to the net. Neymar then tapped home Douglas Costa's chipped cross from the right from close range deeper into the stoppage time.

Neymar's strike seven minutes into stoppage time was the latest ever at a World Cup in regular time. This was Brazil's first World Cup victory thanks to a goal scored in the 90th minute. Costa Rica were knocked out of the tournament after this game for the first time since 2006, with a game to play. In addition, with Germany having won the all-time record of most World Cup goals by any team with 224 goals after their win against Argentina in the final of the previous World Cup, Neymar's goal successfully tied up the record with Germany.

22 June 2018
15:00 MSK (UTC+3)

Brazil	2–0	Costa Rica
Coutinho 90+1'; Neymar 90+7'

Krestovsky Stadium, Saint Petersburg
Attendance: 64,468
Referee: Björn Kuipers (Netherlands)

Brazil	Costa Rica

GK	1	Alisson
RB	22	Fagner
CB	2	Thiago Silva (c)
CB	3	Miranda
LB	12	Marcelo
CM	5	Casemiro
CM	15	Paulinho		(substituted off) 68'
RW	19	Willian		(substituted off) 46'
AM	11	Philippe Coutinho	(yellow card) 81'
LW	10	Neymar	(yellow card) 81'
CF	9	Gabriel Jesus		(substituted off) 90+3'
Substitutions:
FW	7	Douglas Costa		(substituted on) 46'
FW	20	Roberto Firmino		(substituted on) 68'
MF	17	Fernandinho		(substituted on) 90+3'
Manager:
Tite

GK	1	Keylor Navas
SW	2	Jhonny Acosta	(yellow card) 84'
CB	3	Giancarlo González
CB	6	Óscar Duarte
RWB	16	Cristian Gamboa		(substituted off) 75'
LWB	8	Bryan Oviedo
CM	20	David Guzmán		(substituted off) 83'
CM	5	Celso Borges
RW	11	Johan Venegas
LW	10	Bryan Ruiz (c)
CF	21	Marco Ureña		(substituted off) 54'
Substitutions:
MF	7	Christian Bolaños		(substituted on) 54'
DF	15	Francisco Calvo		(substituted on) 75'
MF	17	Yeltsin Tejeda		(substituted on) 83'
Manager:
Óscar Ramírez

Man of the Match:
Philippe Coutinho (Brazil)

Assistant referees:
Sander van Roekel (Netherlands)
Erwin Zeinstra (Netherlands)
Fourth official:
Damir Skomina (Slovenia)
Reserve assistant referee:
Jure Praprotnik (Slovenia)
Video assistant referee:
Danny Makkelie (Netherlands)
Assistant video assistant referees:
Artur Soares Dias (Portugal)
Joe Fletcher (Canada)
Mark Geiger (United States)

=== Serbia vs Switzerland ===
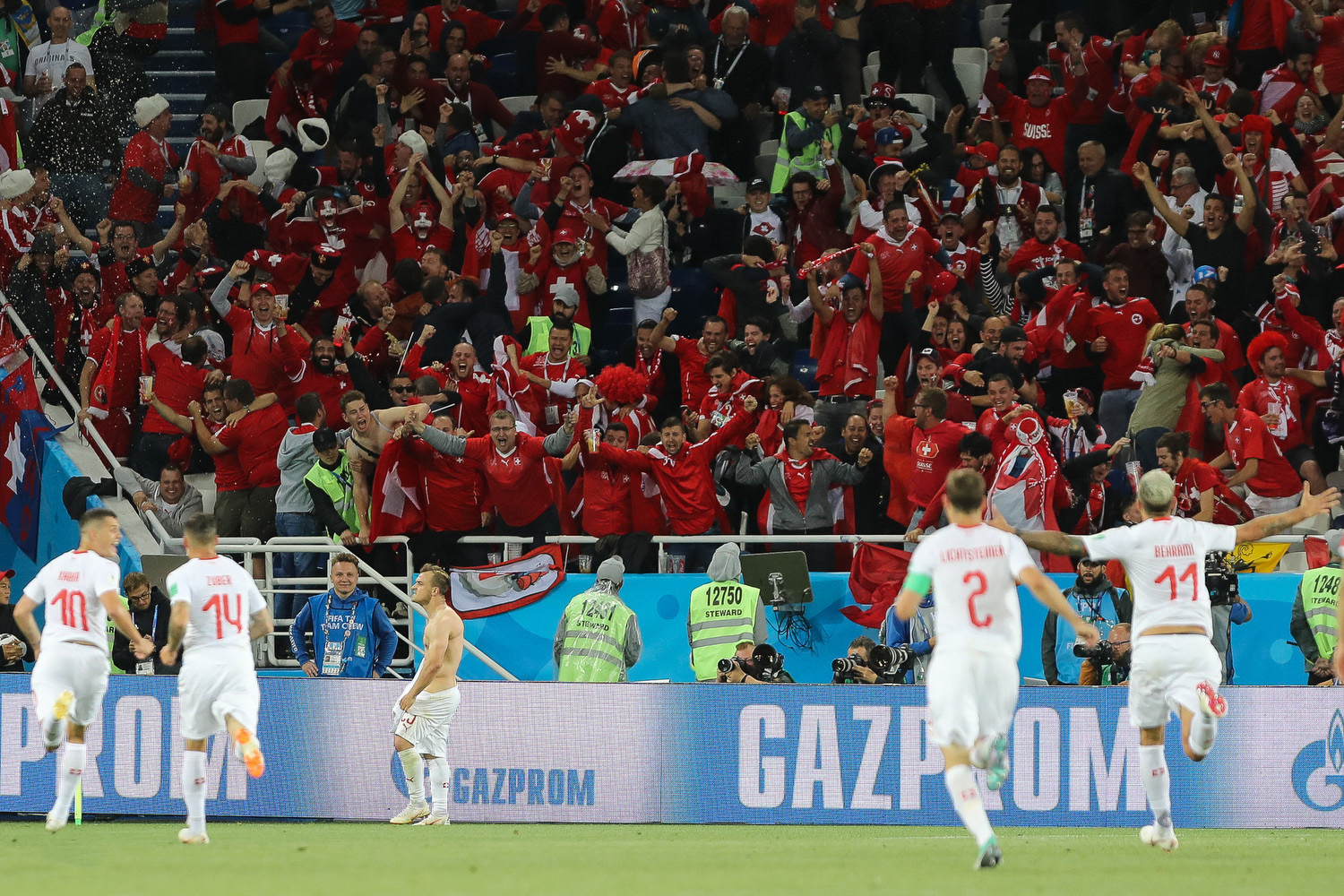
Swiss players and fans celebrating Shaqiri's goal

The two teams had never met. Playing as Yugoslavia, the two teams met 13 times, including one game at the 1950 FIFA World Cup group stage, a 3–0 victory for Yugoslavia.

Dušan Tadić checked back onto his left foot to send in a cross from the right that Aleksandar Mitrović met with a header into the left side of the net. Blerim Džemaili shot wide from inside the penalty area. Serbia pressed and Sergej Milinković-Savić shot narrowly wide with a rising 20-yard drive. With almost half an hour played Steven Zuber passed the ball to Džemaili who drew a one-handed save from Vladimir Stojković down to the goalkeeper's right. After 52 minutes, Xherdan Shaqiri's shot rebounded back to Granit Xhaka and the midfielder curled a right-footed shot into the far corner of the net from 25 yards. Shaqiri hit the frame of the goal with a bending effort from the right. Switzerland substitute Mario Gavranović was flagged offside as he hit the side-netting. And, in the final minute of normal time, Gavranović played a throughball to Shaqiri, who outpaced Duško Tošić and ran from near the half-way line into the box before nutmegging Stojković with a low finish from the left.

Stephan Lichtsteiner made his ninth World Cup appearance for Switzerland in this game, breaking the national record held by Charles Antenen since 1962.

22 June 2018
20:00 KALT (UTC+2)

Serbia	1–2	Switzerland
Mitrović 5'		Xhaka 52'; Shaqiri 90'

Kaliningrad Stadium, Kaliningrad
Attendance: 33,167
Referee: Felix Brych (Germany)

Serbia	Switzerland

GK	1	Vladimir Stojković
RB	6	Branislav Ivanović
CB	15	Nikola Milenković
CB	3	Duško Tošić
LB	11	Aleksandar Kolarov (c)
CM	21	Nemanja Matić	(yellow card) 45+2'
CM	4	Luka Milivojević	(yellow card) 39'	(substituted off) 81'
RW	10	Dušan Tadić
AM	20	Sergej Milinković-Savić	(yellow card) 34'
LW	17	Filip Kostić		(substituted off) 64'
CF	9	Aleksandar Mitrović	(yellow card) 87'
Substitutions:
MF	22	Adem Ljajić		(substituted on) 64'
FW	18	Nemanja Radonjić		(substituted on) 81'
Manager:
Mladen Krstajić

GK	1	Yann Sommer
RB	2	Stephan Lichtsteiner (c)
CB	22	Fabian Schär
CB	5	Manuel Akanji
LB	13	Ricardo Rodriguez
CM	11	Valon Behrami
CM	10	Granit Xhaka
RW	23	Xherdan Shaqiri	(yellow card) 90+1'
AM	15	Blerim Džemaili		(substituted off) 73'
LW	14	Steven Zuber		(substituted off) 90+4'
CF	9	Haris Seferovic		(substituted off) 46'
Substitutions:
FW	18	Mario Gavranović		(substituted on) 46'
FW	7	Breel Embolo		(substituted on) 73'
FW	19	Josip Drmić		(substituted on) 90+4'
Manager:
Vladimir Petković

Man of the Match:
Xherdan Shaqiri (Switzerland)

Assistant referees:
Mark Borsch (Germany)
Stefan Lupp (Germany)
Fourth official:
Nawaf Shukralla (Bahrain)
Reserve assistant referee:
Yaser Tulefat (Bahrain)
Video assistant referee:
Felix Zwayer (Germany)
Assistant video assistant referees:
Bastian Dankert (Germany)
Carlos Astroza (Chile)
Clément Turpin (France)

=== Serbia vs Brazil ===
The two teams had met once, a 2014 friendly won by Brazil 1–0. Playing as Yugoslavia, the two teams met 18 times, including four times at FIFA World Cup's group stages in 1930, 1950, 1954 and 1974, with one victory each and two draws.

Marcelo was replaced with Filipe Luís in the 10th minute, due to a back spasm. Gabriel Jesus created a chance for Neymar, whose cross-goal strike was pushed away by Vladimir Stojković. Jesus cut inside of Miloš Veljković and saw his shot blocked behind by Nikola Milenković. In the 36th minute, Paulinho raced between two defenders and poked Philippe Coutinho's delivery beyond the onrushing Stojković. Neymar had a low drive kept out by Stojković at the near post five minutes into the second period. Aleksandar Mitrović headed a cross from Antonio Rukavina straight at the feet of the keeper in the 65th minute. Thiago Silva headed home at the near post from Neymar's left-wing corner in the 68th minute.

Brazil have qualified from the group stage of the World Cup for the 13th consecutive tournament, a run stretching back to 1970. Brazil have now won back-to-back World Cup matches for the first time since 2010, when they won their opening two group matches. For Serbia, this was the second consecutive elimination from the group stage in their World Cup history as an independent nation. Also, after Germany's previous match with Sweden where Germany initially managed to restore the all-time record of World Cup goals by any team with 226 goals, just as Brazil have managed to tie up the record of 224 goals after Neymar's goal in the match against Costa Rica, they have done it again in this match with Thiago Silva's goal that has now brought them to 226 goals with Germany.

27 June 2018
21:00 MSK (UTC+3)

Serbia	0–2	Brazil
		Paulinho 36'; Thiago Silva 68'

Otkritie Arena, Moscow
Attendance: 44,190
Referee: Alireza Faghani (Iran)

Serbia	Brazil

GK	1	Vladimir Stojković
RB	2	Antonio Rukavina
CB	15	Nikola Milenković
CB	13	Miloš Veljković
LB	11	Aleksandar Kolarov (c)
CM	21	Nemanja Matić	(yellow card) 48'
CM	20	Sergej Milinković-Savić
RW	10	Dušan Tadić
AM	22	Adem Ljajić	(yellow card) 33'	(substituted off) 75'
LW	17	Filip Kostić		(substituted off) 82'
CF	9	Aleksandar Mitrović	(yellow card) 70'	(substituted off) 89'
Substitutions:
MF	7	Andrija Živković		(substituted on) 75'
FW	18	Nemanja Radonjić		(substituted on) 82'
FW	19	Luka Jović		(substituted on) 89'
Manager:
Mladen Krstajić

GK	1	Alisson
RB	22	Fagner
CB	2	Thiago Silva
CB	3	Miranda (c)
LB	12	Marcelo	(substituted off) 10'
CM	15	Paulinho	(substituted off) 66'
CM	5	Casemiro
RW	19	Willian
AM	11	Philippe Coutinho	(substituted off) 80'
LW	10	Neymar
CF	9	Gabriel Jesus
Substitutions:
DF	6	Filipe Luís	(substituted on) 10'
MF	17	Fernandinho	(substituted on) 66'
MF	8	Renato Augusto	(substituted on) 80'
Manager:
Tite

Man of the Match:
Paulinho (Brazil)

Assistant referees:
Reza Sokhandan (Iran)
Mohammadreza Mansouri (Iran)
Fourth official:
Jair Marrufo (United States)
Reserve assistant referee:
Anouar Hmila (Tunisia)
Video assistant referee:
Massimiliano Irrati (Italy)
Assistant video assistant referees:
Paweł Gil (Poland)
Paweł Sokolnicki (Poland)
Paolo Valeri (Italy)

=== Switzerland vs Costa Rica ===
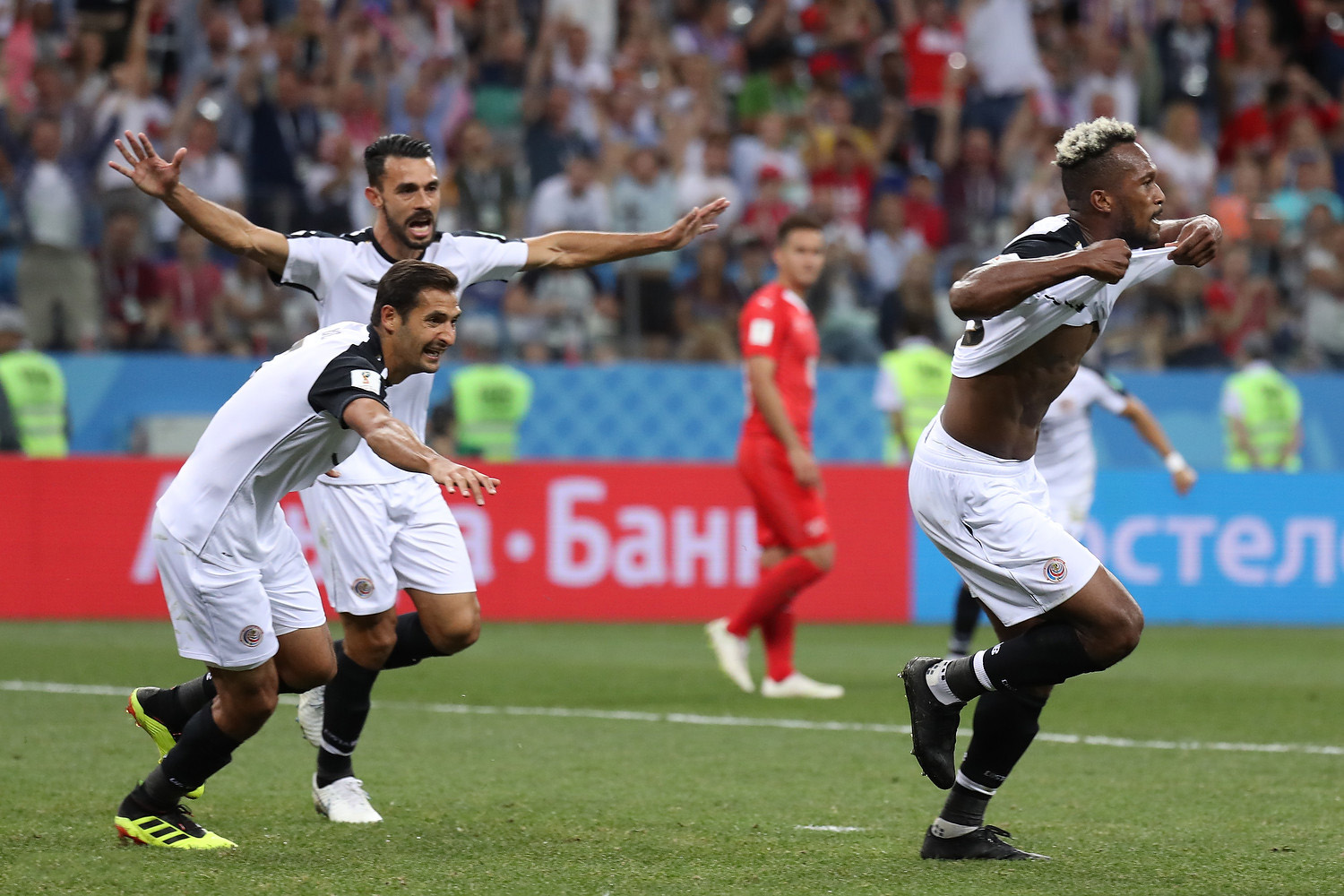
The Costa Ricans celebrating Waston's goal

The two teams had faced each other twice, most recently in a 2010 friendly won by Costa Rica 1–0.

Two Costa Rican shots hit the woodwork, one of which was tipped on to the post by Sommer, before Stephan Lichtsteiner's right-wing cross was headed back across goal by Breel Embolo, and the unmarked Blerim Džemaili lashed home from eight yards. Keylor Navas blocked Embolo's effort at his near post, before Kendall Waston headed Joel Campbell's outswinging corner from six yards after 56 minutes. Josip Drmić slotted into the bottom corner from Denis Zakaria's low cross. Switzerland then hit the frame of the goal in the 78th minute. Referee awarded a spot-kick after Bryan Ruiz had been bundled over in the area, only for the decision to be reversed after replays showed that he had strayed into an offside position when he received the ball. Ruiz did get a chance from the spot in the third minute of stoppage time when Campbell was felled in the box, his penalty hit the bar and then bounced in the net off of Yann Sommer's head as an own goal.

Waston's goal for Costa Rica was their first in 424 minutes of play in World Cup matches (not including penalty shoot-outs), with their previous goal scored by Ruiz in the last 16 of the 2014 tournament against Greece. Switzerland have avoided defeat in each of their three group stage matches at the World Cup for the first time since 2006. Costa Rica became the last side to score a goal at Russia 2018. Sommer is just the third goalkeeper to score an own goal at the World Cup, after Honduras' Noel Valladares against France in 2014 and Spain's Andoni Zubizarreta against Nigeria in 1998.

27 June 2018
21:00 MSK (UTC+3)

Switzerland	2–2	Costa Rica
Džemaili 31'; Drmić 88'		Waston 56'; Sommer 90+3' (o.g.)

Nizhny Novgorod Stadium, Nizhny Novgorod
Attendance: 43,319
Referee: Clément Turpin (France)

Switzerland	Costa Rica

GK	1	Yann Sommer
RB	2	Stephan Lichtsteiner (c)	(yellow card) 37'
CB	22	Fabian Schär	(yellow card) 83'
CB	5	Manuel Akanji
LB	13	Ricardo Rodriguez
CM	11	Valon Behrami		(substituted off) 60'
CM	10	Granit Xhaka
RW	23	Xherdan Shaqiri		(substituted off) 81'
AM	15	Blerim Džemaili
LW	7	Breel Embolo
CF	18	Mario Gavranović		(substituted off) 69'
Substitutions:
MF	17	Denis Zakaria	(yellow card) 75'	(substituted on) 60'
FW	19	Josip Drmić		(substituted on) 69'
DF	6	Michael Lang		(substituted on) 81'
Manager:
Vladimir Petković

GK	1	Keylor Navas
SW	3	Giancarlo González
CB	2	Jhonny Acosta
CB	19	Kendall Waston	(yellow card) 89'
RWB	16	Cristian Gamboa	(yellow card) 11'	(substituted off) 90+3'
LWB	8	Bryan Oviedo
CM	5	Celso Borges
CM	20	David Guzmán		(substituted off) 90+1'
RW	9	Daniel Colindres		(substituted off) 81'
LW	10	Bryan Ruiz (c)
CF	12	Joel Campbell	(yellow card) 29'
Substitutions:
MF	13	Rodney Wallace		(substituted on) 81'
MF	14	Randall Azofeifa		(substituted on) 90+1'
DF	4	Ian Smith		(substituted on) 90+3'
Manager:
Óscar Ramírez

Man of the Match:
Blerim Džemaili (Switzerland)

Assistant referees:
Nicolas Danos (France)
Cyril Gringore (France)
Fourth official:
Norbert Hauata (Tahiti)
Reserve assistant referee:
Bertrand Brial (New Caledonia)
Video assistant referee:
Felix Zwayer (Germany)
Assistant video assistant referees:
Bastian Dankert (Germany)
Mark Borsch (Germany)
Szymon Marciniak (Poland)

== Discipline ==
Fair play points would have been used as tiebreakers if the overall and head-to-head records of teams were tied. These were calculated based on yellow and red cards received in all group matches as follows:

- first yellow card: minus 1 point;
- indirect red card (second yellow card): minus 3 points;
- direct red card: minus 4 points;
- yellow card and direct red card: minus 5 points;

Only one of the above deductions were applied to a player in a single match.

Team	Match 1				Match 2				Match 3				Points
Team	Yellow card	(yellow card) (yellow-red card)	Red card	(yellow card) (red card)	Yellow card	(yellow card) (yellow-red card)	Red card	(yellow card) (red card)	Yellow card	(yellow card) (yellow-red card)	Red card	(yellow card) (red card)	Points
Brazil	1				2								−3
Costa Rica	2				1				3				−6
Switzerland	3				1				3				−7
Serbia	2				4				3				−9

== See also ==
- Brazil at the FIFA World Cup
- Costa Rica at the FIFA World Cup
- Serbia at the FIFA World Cup
- Switzerland at the FIFA World Cup
