= Switzerland at the FIFA World Cup =

International football delegation

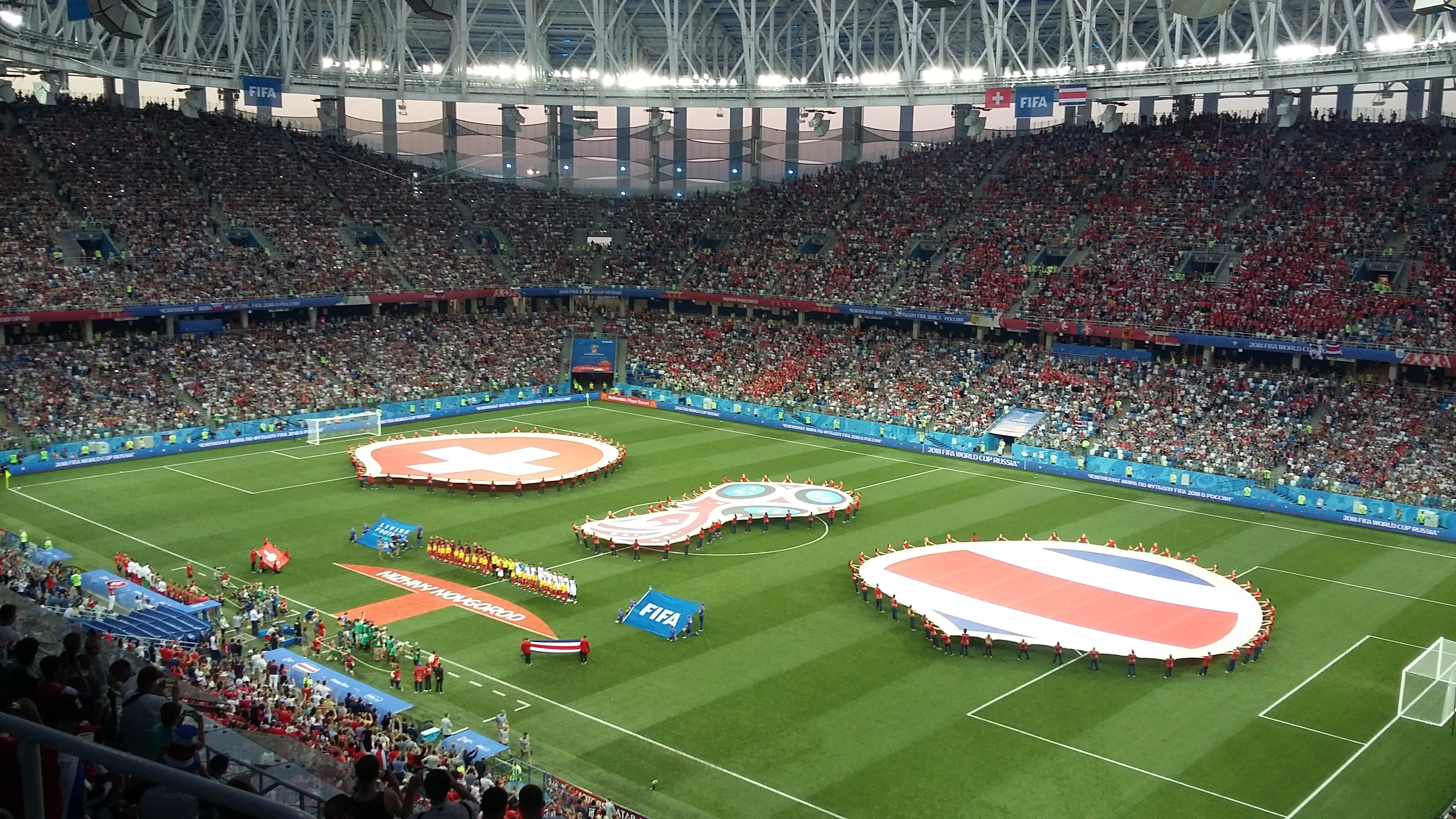
Switzerland vs Costa Rica match in Nizhny Novgorod, Russia (2018)

The FIFA World Cup, sometimes called the Football World Cup, but usually referred to simply as the World Cup, is an international association football competition contested by the men's national teams of the members of Fédération Internationale de Football Association (FIFA), the sport's global governing body. The championship has been awarded every four years since the first tournament in 1930, except in 1942 and 1946 due to World War II.

The tournament consists of two parts, the qualification phase and the final phase (officially called the World Cup Finals). The qualification phase, which currently take place over the three years preceding the Finals, is used to determine which teams qualify for the Finals. The current format of the Finals involves 48 teams competing for the title, at venues within the host nation (or nations) over a period of about a month. The World Cup final is the most widely viewed sporting event in the world, with an estimated 715.1 million people watching the 2006 tournament final.

Switzerland have appeared in the World Cup on twelve occasions. They have reached the quarter-finals four times, in 1934, 1938, 1954, and 2026.

== World Cup record ==
Switzerland's record at FIFA World Cups:

Year	Round	Position	Pld	W	D*	L	GF	GA
(Uruguay) 1930	Did not enter							
(Italy) 1934	Quarter-finals	7th	2	1	0	1	5	5
(France) 1938	Quarter-finals	7th	3	1	1	1	5	5
(Brazil) 1950	Group stage	6th	3	1	1	1	4	6
(Switzerland) 1954	Quarter-finals	8th	4	2	0	2	11	11
(Sweden) 1958	Did not qualify							
(Chile) 1962	Group stage	16th	3	0	0	3	2	8
(England) 1966	Group stage	16th	3	0	0	3	1	9
(Mexico) 1970	Did not qualify							
(West Germany) 1974	Did not qualify							
(Argentina) 1978	Did not qualify							
(Spain) 1982	Did not qualify							
(Mexico) 1986	Did not qualify							
(Italy) 1990	Did not qualify							
(United States) 1994	Round of 16	16th	4	1	1	2	5	7
(France) 1998	Did not qualify							
(South Korea) (Japan) 2002	Did not qualify							
(Germany) 2006	Round of 16	10th	4	2	2	0	4	0
(South Africa) 2010	Group stage	19th	3	1	1	1	1	1
(Brazil) 2014	Round of 16	11th	4	2	0	2	7	7
(Russia) 2018	Round of 16	14th	4	1	2	1	5	5
(Qatar) 2022	Round of 16	12th	4	2	0	2	5	9
(Canada) (Mexico) (United States) 2026	Quarter-finals	7th	6	3	2	1	10	6
(Morocco) (Portugal) (Spain) 2030	To be determined							
(Saudi Arabia) 2034	To be determined							
Total: 13/23	Quarter-finals	7th	47	17	10	20	65	79

*Draws include knockout matches decided via penalty shoot-out.

Switzerland's World Cup record
First Match	Switzerland 3–2 Netherlands (27 May 1934; Milan, Italy)
Biggest Win	Switzerland 4–1 Italy (23 June 1954; Basel, Switzerland); Switzerland 4–1 Romania (22 June 1994; Pontiac, United States); Honduras 0–3 Switzerland (25 June 2014; Manaus, Brazil); Switzerland 4–1 Bosnia and Herzegovina (18 June 2026; Inglewood, United States)
Biggest Defeat	West Germany 5–0 Switzerland (12 July 1966; Sheffield, England); Portugal 6–1 Switzerland (6 December 2022; Lusail, Qatar)
Best Result	Quarter-finals in 1934, 1938, 1954, and 2026
Worst Result	Group stage in 1950, 1962, 1966 and 2010

== By match ==
World Cup	Round	Opponent	Score	Result	Location	Switzerland scorers
1934	Round of 16	Netherlands	3–2	W	Milan	Kielholz (2), Abegglen
1934	Quarter-finals	Czechoslovakia	2–3	L	Turin	Kielholz, Jäggi
1938	Round of 16	Germany	1–1 (a.e.t.)	D	Paris	Abegglen
1938	Round of 16	Germany (replay)	4–2	W	Paris	Walaschek, Bickel, Abegglen (2)
1938	Quarter-finals	Hungary	0–2	L	Lille	—
1950	Group 1	Yugoslavia	0–3	L	Belo Horizonte	—
1950	Group 1	Brazil	2–2	D	São Paulo	Fatton (2)
1950	Group 1	Mexico	2–1	W	Porto Alegre	Bader, Antenen
1954	Group 2	Italy	2–1	W	Lausanne	Ballaman, Hügi
1954	Group 2	England	0–2	L	Bern	—
1954	Group 2	Italy (play-off)	4–1	W	Basel	Hügi (2), Ballaman, Fatton
1954	Quarter-final	Austria	5–7	L	Lausanne	Ballaman (2), Hügi (3)
1962	Group 2	Chile	1–3	L	Santiago	Wüthrich
1962	Group 2	West Germany	1–2	L	Santiago	Schneiter
1962	Group 2	Italy	0–3	L	Santiago	—
1966	Group 2	West Germany	0–5	L	Sheffield	—
1966	Group 2	Spain	1–2	L	Sheffield	Quentin
1966	Group 2	Argentina	0–2	L	Sheffield	—
1994	Group A	United States	1–1	D	Pontiac	Bregy
1994	Group A	Romania	4–1	W	Pontiac	Sutter, Chapuisat, Knup (2)
1994	Group A	Colombia	0–2	L	Palo Alto	—
1994	Round of 16	Spain	0–3	L	Washington	—
2006	Group G	France	0–0	D	Stuttgart	—
2006	Group G	Togo	2–0	W	Dortmund	Frei, Barnetta
2006	Group G	South Korea	2–0	W	Hanover	Senderos, Frei
2006	Round of 16	Ukraine	0–0 (a.e.t.) (0–3 p)	D	Cologne	—
2010	Group H	Spain	1–0	W	Durban	Fernandes
2010	Group H	Chile	0–1	L	Port Elizabeth	—
2010	Group H	Honduras	0–0	D	Bloemfontein	—
2014	Group E	Ecuador	2–1	W	Brasília	Mehmedi, Seferovic
2014	Group E	France	2–5	L	Salvador	Džemaili, Xhaka
2014	Group E	Honduras	3–0	W	Manaus	Shaqiri (3)
2014	Round of 16	Argentina	0–1 (a.e.t.)	L	São Paulo	—
2018	Group E	Brazil	1–1	D	Rostov-on-Don	Zuber
2018	Group E	Serbia	2–1	W	Kaliningrad	Xhaka, Shaqiri
2018	Group E	Costa Rica	2–2	D	Nizhny Novgorod	Džemaili, Drmić
2018	Round of 16	Sweden	0–1	L	Saint Petersburg	—
2022	Group G	Cameroon	1–0	W	Al Wakrah	Embolo
2022	Group G	Brazil	0–1	L	Doha	—
2022	Group G	Serbia	3–2	W	Doha	Shaqiri, Embolo, Freuler
2022	Round of 16	Portugal	1–6	L	Lusail	Akanji
2026	Group B	Qatar	1–1	D	Santa Clara	Embolo
2026	Group B	Bosnia and Herzegovina	4–1	W	Inglewood	Manzambi (2), Vargas, Xhaka
2026	Group B	Canada	2–1	W	Vancouver	Vargas, Manzambi
2026	Round of 32	Algeria	2–0	W	Vancouver	Embolo, Ndoye
2026	Round of 16	Colombia	0–0 (a.e.t.) (4–3 p)	D	Vancouver	—
2026	Quarter-finals	Argentina	1–3 (a.e.t.)	L	Kansas City	Ndoye

== Match records ==
=== 1934 FIFA World Cup ===
The group stage used in the first World Cup was discarded in favour of a straight knockout tournament.

27 May 1934 (first round)
16:30 (CEST)

Switzerland	3–2	Netherlands
Kielholz 7', 43'; Abegglen 69'	Report	Smit 19'; Vente 84'

Stadio San Siro, Milan
Attendance: ~40,000
Referee: Ivan Eklind (Sweden)

31 May 1934 (Quarter-Finals)
16:30 (CEST)

Czechoslovakia	3–2	Switzerland
Svoboda 24'; Sobotka 49'; Nejedlý 82'	Report	Kielholz 18'; Jäggi 78'

Stadio Benito Mussolini, Turin
Attendance: ~12,000
Referee: Alois Beranek (Austria)

=== 1938 FIFA World Cup ===
4 June 1938 (first round)
17:00 (WEST)

Switzerland	1–1 (a.e.t.)	Germany
Abegglen 43'	Report	Gauchel 29'

Parc des Princes, Paris
Attendance: 27,162
Referee: John Langenus (Belgium)

9 June 1938 (first round Replay)
18:00 (WEST)

Germany	2–4	Switzerland
Hahnemann 8'; Lörtscher 22' (o.g.)	Report	Walaschek 42'; Bickel 64'; Abegglen 75', 78'

Parc des Princes, Paris
Attendance: 20,265
Referee: Ivan Eklind (Sweden)

12 June 1938 (Quarter-Finals)
17:00 (WEST)

Switzerland	0–2	Hungary
	Report	Sárosi 40'; Zsengellér 89'

Stade Victor Boucquey, Lille
Attendance: 14,000
Referee: Rinaldo Barlassina (Italy)

=== 1950 FIFA World Cup ===
Team	Pld	W	D	L	GF	GA	Pts
Brazil	3	2	1	0	8	2	5
Yugoslavia	3	2	0	1	7	3	4
Switzerland	3	1	1	1	4	6	3
Mexico	3	0	0	3	2	10	0

25 June 1950 (first round)
18:00 BRT (UTC-03)

Yugoslavia	3 – 0	Switzerland
Mitić 59'; Tomašević 70'; Ognjanov 75'	Report

Estádio Independência, Belo Horizonte
Attendance: 7,500
Referee: Giovanni Galeati (Italy)

28 June 1950 (first round)
15:00 BRT (UTC-03)

Brazil	2 – 2	Switzerland
Alfredo 3'; Baltazar 32'	Report	Fatton 17', 88'

Estádio do Pacaembu, São Paulo
Attendance: 42,000
Referee: Ramón Azon Roma (Spain)

2 July 1950 (first round)
15:40 BRT (UTC-03)

Switzerland	2 – 1	Mexico
Bader 10'; Antenen 44'	Report	Casarín 89'

Estádio dos Eucaliptos, Porto Alegre
Attendance: 4,000
Referee: Ivan Eklind (Sweden)

=== 1954 FIFA World Cup ===
Switzerland hosted the tournament in 1954 and reached the quarter-final for a third time, where the team was beaten 7–5 by neighbouring Austria.

Team	Pld	W	D	L	GF	GA	Pts
England	2	1	1	0	6	4	3
Switzerland	2	1	0	1	2	3	2
Italy	2	1	0	1	5	3	2
Belgium	2	0	1	1	5	8	1

- Switzerland finished ahead of Italy by winning a play-off
17 June 1954 (first round)
17:50 (CET)

Switzerland	2–1	Italy
Ballaman 18'; Hügi 78'	Report	Boniperti 44'

Stade Olympique de la Pontaise, Lausanne
Attendance: 43,000
Referee: Mario Vianna (Brazil)

20 June 1954 (first round)
17:10 (CET)

England	2–0	Switzerland
Mullen 43'; Wilshaw 69'	Report

Wankdorf Stadium, Bern
Attendance: 50,000
Referee: Istvan Zsolt (Hungary)

23 June 1954
(first round Play-off)
18:00 (CET)

Switzerland	4–1	Italy
Hügi 14', 85'; Ballaman 48'; Fatton 90'	Report	Nesti 67'

St. Jakob Stadium, Basel
Attendance: 30,000
Referee: Benjamin Griffiths (Wales)

26 June 1954 (Quarter-Finals)
17:00 (CET)

Austria	7–5	Switzerland
Wagner 25', 27', 53'; R. Körner 26', 34'; Ocwirk 32'; Probst 76'	Report	Ballaman 16', 39'; Hügi 17', 19', 58'

Stade Olympique de la Pontaise, Lausanne
Attendance: 35,000
Referee: Charlie Faultless (Scotland)

=== 1962 FIFA World Cup ===
After missing out on the previous tournament, Switzerland qualified for the 1962 edition, held in Chile. Unfortunately, they finished at the bottom of Group 2 without a single point, having lost all their matches.

Team	Pld	W	D	L	GF	GA	GAv	Pts
West Germany	3	2	1	0	4	1	4.00	5
Chile	3	2	0	1	5	3	1.67	4
Italy	3	1	1	1	3	2	1.50	3
Switzerland	3	0	0	3	2	8	0.25	0

30 May 1962 (first round)
15:00 CLT (UTC-04)

Chile	3–1	Switzerland
L. Sánchez 44', 55'; Ramírez 51'	Report	Wüthrich 6'

Estadio Nacional, Santiago
Attendance: 65,000
Referee: Kenneth Aston (England)

3 June 1962 (first round)
15:00 CLT (UTC-04)

West Germany	2–1	Switzerland
Brülls 45'; Seeler 59'	Report	Schneiter 73'

Estadio Nacional, Santiago
Attendance: 64,922
Referee: Leo Horn (Netherlands)

7 June 1962 (first round)
15:00 CLT (UTC-04)

Italy	3–0	Switzerland
Mora 1'; Bulgarelli 65', 67'	Report

Estadio Nacional, Santiago
Attendance: 59,828
Referee: Nikolay Latyshev (Soviet Union)

=== 1966 FIFA World Cup ===
Despite securing back-to-back qualification for the FIFA World Cups, Switzerland's performance in the 1966 edition was far more abysmal. They lost all of their matches once more, including a 5-0 walloping by eventual runners-up West Germany in their opening game. To date, this remains as Switzerland's worst performance.

This was also Switzerland's last FIFA World Cup campaign in 28 years, as their next appearance at the tournament would come in the 1994 edition.

Team	Pld	W	D	L	GF	GA	GAv	Pts
West Germany	3	2	1	0	7	1	7.00	5
Argentina	3	2	1	0	4	1	4.00	5
Spain	3	1	0	2	4	5	0.80	2
Switzerland	3	0	0	3	1	9	0.11	0

- West Germany was placed first due to superior goal average.
12 July 1966 (first round)
19:30 BST

West Germany	5–0	Switzerland
Held 16'; Haller 21', 77' (pen.); Beckenbauer 40', 52'	Report

Hillsborough Stadium, Sheffield
Attendance: 36,000
Referee: Hugh Phillips (Scotland)

15 July 1966 (first round)
19:30 BST

Spain	2–1	Switzerland
Sanchís 57'; Amancio 75'	Report	Quentin 31'

Hillsborough Stadium, Sheffield
Attendance: 32,000
Referee: Tofik Bakhramov (Soviet Union)

19 July 1966 (first round)
19:30 BST

Argentina	2–0	Switzerland
Artime 52'; Onega 79'	Report

Hillsborough Stadium, Sheffield
Attendance: 32,000
Referee: Joaquim Campos (Portugal)

=== 1994 FIFA World Cup ===
Pos	Team	Pld	W	D	L	GF	GA	GD	Pts	Qualification
1	Romania	3	2	0	1	5	5	0	6	Advance to knockout stage
2	Switzerland	3	1	1	1	5	4	+1	4	Advance to knockout stage
3	United States (H)	3	1	1	1	3	3	0	4	Advance to knockout stage
4	Colombia	3	1	0	2	4	5	−1	3	

Source: FIFA
(H) Hosts
18 June 1994 (first round)
11:30 EDT

United States	1–1	Switzerland
Wynalda 45'	Report	Bregy 39'

Pontiac Silverdome, Pontiac
Attendance: 73,425
Referee: Francisco Oscar Lamolina (Argentina)

United States	Switzerland

GK	1	Tony Meola (c)
SW	17	Marcelo Balboa
RB	4	Cle Kooiman
CB	22	Alexi Lalas
LB	20	Paul Caligiuri
RM	9	Tab Ramos
CM	16	Mike Sorber
CM	5	Thomas Dooley
LM	6	John Harkes	(yellow card) 89'
CF	8	Earnie Stewart		(substituted off) 81'
CF	11	Eric Wynalda		(substituted off) 58'
Substitutions:
FW	10	Roy Wegerle		(substituted on) 58'
FW	13	Cobi Jones		(substituted on) 81'
Manager:
(Federal Republic of Yugoslavia) Bora Milutinović

GK	1	Marco Pascolo
SW	5	Alain Geiger (c)
RB	2	Marc Hottiger
CB	4	Dominique Herr	(yellow card) 26'
LB	3	Yvan Quentin
CM	6	Georges Bregy
CM	10	Ciriaco Sforza		(substituted off) 77'
RW	8	Christophe Ohrel
AM	16	Thomas Bickel		(substituted off) 72'
LW	7	Alain Sutter
CF	11	Stéphane Chapuisat
Substitutions:
FW	14	Nestor Subiat	(yellow card) 82'	(substituted on) 72'
MF	21	Thomas Wyss		(substituted on) 77'
Manager:
(England) Roy Hodgson

Assistant referees:
Ernesto Taibi (Argentina)
Venancio Zarate (Paraguay)
Fourth official:
Ernesto Filippi (Uruguay)

22 June 1994 (first round)
16:00 EDT

Romania	1–4	Switzerland
Hagi 35'	Report	Sutter 16'; Chapuisat 52'; Knup 65', 72'

Pontiac Silverdome, Pontiac
Attendance: 61,428
Referee: Neji Jouini (Tunisia)

Romania	Switzerland

GK	12	Bogdan Stelea
DF	2	Dan Petrescu
DF	3	Daniel Prodan
DF	4	Miodrag Belodedici	(yellow card) 47'
MF	5	Ioan Lupescu	(yellow card) 40'	(substituted off) 85'
MF	6	Gheorghe Popescu
MF	7	Dorinel Munteanu
FW	9	Florin Răducioiu
MF	10	Gheorghe Hagi (c)
MF	11	Ilie Dumitrescu		(substituted off) 70'
DF	14	Gheorghe Mihali	(yellow card) 32'
Substitutions:
MF	15	Basarab Panduru		(substituted on) 85'
FW	16	Ion Vlădoiu	(red card) 73'	(substituted on) 70'
Manager:
Anghel Iordănescu

GK	1	Marco Pascolo
DF	2	Marc Hottiger
DF	3	Yvan Quentin
DF	4	Dominique Herr
DF	5	Alain Geiger (c)
MF	6	Georges Bregy
MF	7	Alain Sutter	(substituted off) 71'
DF	8	Christophe Ohrel	(substituted off) 83'
FW	9	Adrian Knup
MF	10	Ciriaco Sforza
FW	11	Stéphane Chapuisat
Substitutions:
MF	16	Thomas Bickel	(substituted on) 71'
MF	20	Patrick Sylvestre	(substituted on) 83'
Manager:
(England) Roy Hodgson

Assistant referees:
Abdel-Magid Hassan (Egypt)
Davoud Fanaei (Iran)
Fourth official:
Joël Quiniou (France)

Note: Switzerland's fourth goal is also credited to Georges Bregy.

26 June 1994 (first round)
13:00 PDT

Switzerland	0–2	Colombia
	Report	Gaviria 44'; Lozano 90'

Stanford Stadium, Palo Alto
Attendance: 83,401
Referee: Peter Mikkelsen (Denmark)

Switzerland	Colombia

GK	1	Marco Pascolo
DF	2	Marc Hottiger
DF	3	Yvan Quentin
DF	4	Dominique Herr
DF	5	Alain Geiger (c)
MF	6	Georges Bregy	(yellow card) 85'
MF	7	Alain Sutter		(substituted off) 82'
DF	8	Christophe Ohrel
FW	9	Adrian Knup	(yellow card) 39'	(substituted off) 82'
MF	10	Ciriaco Sforza
FW	11	Stéphane Chapuisat
Substitutions:
FW	14	Nestor Subiat		(substituted on) 82'
FW	15	Marco Grassi		(substituted on) 82'
Manager:
(England) Roy Hodgson

GK	1	Óscar Córdoba
DF	2	Andrés Escobar
DF	3	Alexis Mendoza
DF	4	Luis Fernando Herrera
MF	5	Hernán Gaviria	(yellow card) 58'	(substituted off) 79'
MF	10	Carlos Valderrama (c)	(yellow card) 62'
FW	11	Adolfo Valencia		(substituted off) 64'
MF	14	Leonel Álvarez	(yellow card) 80'
MF	19	Freddy Rincón
DF	20	Wilson Pérez
FW	21	Faustino Asprilla
Substitutions:
FW	7	Antony de Ávila		(substituted on) 64'
MF	8	John Harold Lozano		(substituted on) 79'
Manager:
Francisco Maturana

Assistant referees:
Carl-Johan Meyer Christensen (Denmark)
Douglas Micael James (Trinidad and Tobago)
Fourth official:
Arturo Brizio Carter (Mexico)

2 July 1994 (round of 16)
16:35

Spain	3–0	Switzerland
Hierro 15'; Luis Enrique 74'; Begiristain 86' (pen.)	Report

RFK Stadium, Washington
Attendance: 53,121
Referee: Mario van der Ende (Netherlands)

Spain	Switzerland

GK	1	Andoni Zubizarreta (c)
DF	2	Albert Ferrer	(yellow card) 19'
DF	4	Paco Camarasa	(yellow card) 22'
DF	5	Abelardo
DF	6	Fernando Hierro		(substituted off) 76'
MF	7	Andoni Goikoetxea	(yellow card) 18'	(substituted off) 61'
MF	10	José Mari Bakero
DF	12	Sergi
DF	18	Rafael Alkorta
MF	20	Miguel Ángel Nadal
MF	21	Luis Enrique
Substitutions:
MF	11	Txiki Begiristain		(substituted on) 61'
DF	3	Jorge Otero	(yellow card) 87'	(substituted on) 76'
Manager:
Javier Clemente

GK	1	Marco Pascolo	(yellow card) 85'
DF	2	Marc Hottiger	(yellow card) 23'
DF	3	Yvan Quentin		(substituted off) 58'
DF	4	Dominique Herr
DF	5	Alain Geiger (c)
MF	6	Georges Bregy
DF	8	Christophe Ohrel		(substituted off) 73'
FW	9	Adrian Knup
MF	10	Ciriaco Sforza
FW	11	Stéphane Chapuisat
MF	16	Thomas Bickel
Substitutions:
DF	19	Jürg Studer	(yellow card) 69'	(substituted on) 58'
FW	14	Nestor Subiat	(yellow card) 77'	(substituted on) 73'
Manager:
(England) Roy Hodgson

=== 2006 FIFA World Cup ===
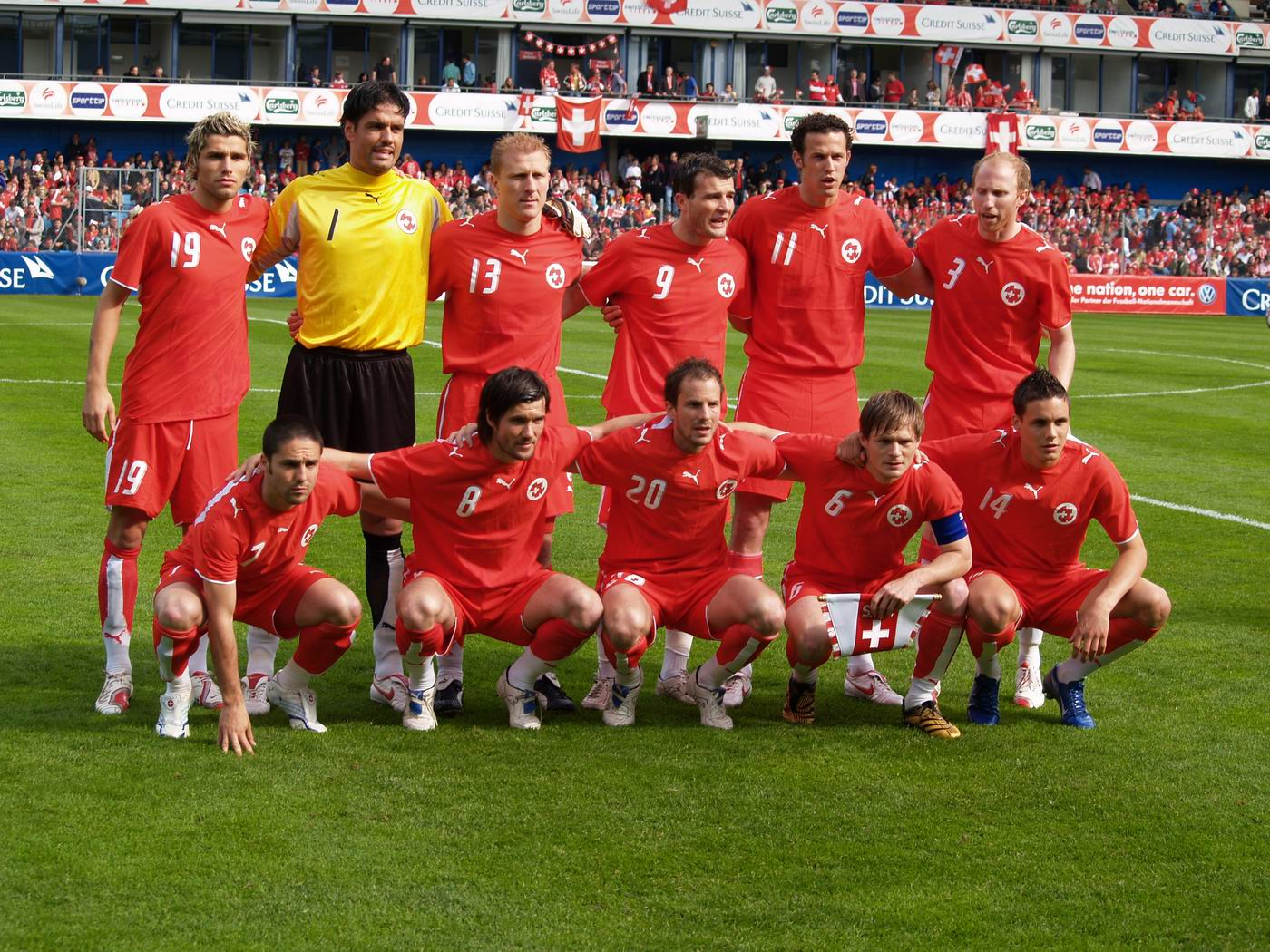
The Swiss line-up against China, just before World Cup 2006

The World Cup 2006 in Germany was the first World Cup for Switzerland since their participation at the World Cup 1994. After finishing second behind France in qualifying group 4, they defeated Turkey in the play-off round 2–0 and 4–2 to qualify for the main tournament.

In the group stage, they played again against France. The game played in Stuttgart ended in a goalless draw. After defeating Togo 2–0 in Dortmund and South Korea also 2–0 in Hannover, they finished first in group G and qualified for the knockout stage. In the second round of the tournament, they faced Ukraine in Cologne. The game had to be decided in a penalty shoot-out since no goal was scored after 120 minutes. Ukraine won the shoot-out 3–0. Switzerland was the only team in tournament not to have conceded a goal during regulation time in their matches. Switzerland's top scorer at the tournament was Alexander Frei with two goals. When Switzerland lost 3–0 on penalties, that was the first time that a team lost on penalties without scoring a single goal in the penalties.

Pos	Team	Pld	W	D	L	GF	GA	GD	Pts	Qualification
1	Switzerland	3	2	1	0	4	0	+4	7	Advance to knockout stage
2	France	3	1	2	0	3	1	+2	5	Advance to knockout stage
3	South Korea	3	1	1	1	3	4	−1	4	
4	Togo	3	0	0	3	1	6	−5	0	

Source: FIFA
Rules for classification: Tie-breaking criteria

All times local (CEST/UTC+2)

13 June 2006 (first round)
18:00

France	0–0	Switzerland
	Report

Gottlieb-Daimler-Stadion, Stuttgart
Attendance: 52,000
Referee: Valentin Ivanov (Russia)

France	Switzerland

GK	16	Fabien Barthez
RB	19	Willy Sagnol	(yellow card) 90+3'
CB	15	Lilian Thuram
CB	5	William Gallas
LB	3	Eric Abidal	(yellow card) 64'
CM	4	Patrick Vieira
CM	6	Claude Makélélé
RW	22	Franck Ribéry		(substituted off) 70'
AM	10	Zinedine Zidane (c)	(yellow card) 72'
LW	11	Sylvain Wiltord		(substituted off) 84'
CF	12	Thierry Henry
Substitutions:
FW	14	Louis Saha		(substituted on) 70'
MF	8	Vikash Dhorasoo		(substituted on) 84'
Manager:
Raymond Domenech

GK	1	Pascal Zuberbühler
RB	23	Philipp Degen	(yellow card) 56'
CB	20	Patrick Müller		(substituted off) 75'
CB	4	Philippe Senderos
LB	3	Ludovic Magnin	(yellow card) 42'
DM	6	Johann Vogel (c)
RM	16	Tranquillo Barnetta
LM	8	Raphaël Wicky		(substituted off) 82'
AM	7	Ricardo Cabanas	(yellow card) 72'
CF	9	Alexander Frei	(yellow card) 90+3'
CF	11	Marco Streller	(yellow card) 45'	(substituted off) 57'
Substitutions:
FW	10	Daniel Gygax		(substituted on) 57'
DF	2	Johan Djourou		(substituted on) 75'
MF	5	Xavier Margairaz		(substituted on) 82'
Manager:
Köbi Kuhn

Man of the Match:
Claude Makélélé (France)

Assistant referees:
Nikolay Golubev (Russia)
Evgueni Volnin (Russia)
Fourth official:
Kevin Stott (United States)
Fifth official:
Gregory Barkey (United States)

19 June 2006 (first round)
15:00

Togo	0–2	Switzerland
	Report	Frei 16'; Barnetta 88'

FIFA WM Stadion Dortmund, Dortmund
Attendance: 65,000
Referee: Carlos Amarilla (Paraguay)

Togo	Switzerland

GK	16	Kossi Agassa
RB	5	Massamasso Tchangai (c)
CB	2	Daré Nibombé
CB	13	Richmond Forson
LB	23	Assimiou Touré
DM	15	Alaixys Romao	(yellow card) 53'
RM	9	Thomas Dossevi		(substituted off) 69'
CM	10	Mamam Cherif Touré		(substituted off) 87'
LM	8	Kuami Agboh		(substituted off) 25'
SS	4	Emmanuel Adebayor	(yellow card) 47'
CF	17	Mohamed Kader
Substitutions:
FW	7	Moustapha Salifou	(yellow card) 45'	(substituted on) 25'
FW	18	Yao Junior Senaya		(substituted on) 69'
FW	11	Robert Malm		(substituted on) 87'
Manager:
(Germany) Otto Pfister

GK	1	Pascal Zuberbühler
RB	23	Philipp Degen
CB	20	Patrick Müller
CB	4	Philippe Senderos
LB	3	Ludovic Magnin
DM	6	Johann Vogel (c)	(yellow card) 90+2'
RM	16	Tranquillo Barnetta
LM	8	Raphaël Wicky
AM	7	Ricardo Cabanas		(substituted off) 77'
CF	9	Alexander Frei		(substituted off) 87'
CF	10	Daniel Gygax		(substituted off) 46'
Substitutions:
MF	22	Hakan Yakin		(substituted on) 46'
FW	11	Marco Streller		(substituted on) 77'
FW	18	Mauro Lustrinelli		(substituted on) 87'
Manager:
Köbi Kuhn

Man of the Match:
Alexander Frei (Switzerland)

Assistant referees:
Amelio Andino (Paraguay)
Manuel Bernal (Paraguay)
Fourth official:
Mohamed Guezzaz (Morocco)
Fifth official:
Brahim Djezzar (Algeria)

23 June 2006 (first round)
21:00

Switzerland	2–0	South Korea
Senderos 23'; Frei 77'	Report

FIFA WM Stadion Hannover, Hanover
Attendance: 43,000
Referee: Horacio Elizondo (Argentina)

Switzerland	Korea Republic

GK	1	Pascal Zuberbühler
RB	23	Philipp Degen
CB	20	Patrick Müller
CB	4	Philippe Senderos	(yellow card) 43'	(substituted off) 53'
LB	17	Christoph Spycher	(yellow card) 82'
DM	6	Johann Vogel (c)
RM	16	Tranquillo Barnetta
LM	8	Raphaël Wicky	(yellow card) 69'	(substituted off) 88'
AM	7	Ricardo Cabanas
SS	22	Hakan Yakin	(yellow card) 55'	(substituted off) 71'
CF	9	Alexander Frei
Substitutions:
DF	2	Johan Djourou	(yellow card) 90'	(substituted on) 53'
MF	5	Xavier Margairaz		(substituted on) 71'
MF	19	Valon Behrami		(substituted on) 88'
Manager:
Köbi Kuhn

GK	1	Lee Woon-jae (c)
RB	12	Lee Young-pyo		(substituted off) 63'
CB	4	Choi Jin-cheul	(yellow card) 78'
CB	6	Kim Jin-kyu	(yellow card) 37'
LB	3	Kim Dong-jin
RM	17	Lee Ho
CM	5	Kim Nam-il
LM	10	Park Chu-young	(yellow card) 23'	(substituted off) 66'
AM	14	Lee Chun-soo	(yellow card) 80'
AM	7	Park Ji-sung
CF	19	Cho Jae-jin
Substitutions:
FW	9	Ahn Jung-hwan	(yellow card) 78'	(substituted on) 63'
FW	11	Seol Ki-hyeon		(substituted on) 66'
Manager:
(Netherlands) Dick Advocaat

Man of the Match:
Alexander Frei (Switzerland)

Assistant referees:
Darío García (Argentina)
Rodolfo Otero (Argentina)
Fourth official:
Essam Abd El Fatah (Egypt)
Fifth official:
Dramane Danté (Mali)

26 June 2006 (round of 16)
21:00

Switzerland	0–0 (a.e.t.)	Ukraine
	Report
Penalties
Streller (penalty missed); Barnetta (penalty missed); Cabanas (penalty missed)	0–3	(penalty missed) Shevchenko; (penalty scored) Milevskyi; (penalty scored) Rebrov; (penalty scored) Husyev

FIFA WM-Stadion Köln, Cologne
Attendance: 45,000
Referee: Benito Archundia (Mexico)

Switzerland	Ukraine

GK	1	Pascal Zuberbühler
RB	23	Philipp Degen
CB	20	Patrick Müller
CB	2	Johan Djourou		(substituted off) 34'
LB	3	Ludovic Magnin
DM	6	Johann Vogel (c)
RM	16	Tranquillo Barnetta	(yellow card) 59'
LM	8	Raphaël Wicky
AM	7	Ricardo Cabanas
SS	22	Hakan Yakin		(substituted off) 64'
CF	9	Alexander Frei		(substituted off) 117'
Substitutions:
DF	13	Stéphane Grichting		(substituted on) 34'
FW	11	Marco Streller		(substituted on) 64'
FW	18	Mauro Lustrinelli		(substituted on) 117'
Manager:
Köbi Kuhn

GK	1	Oleksandr Shovkovskyi
CB	9	Oleh Husyev
CB	17	Vladislav Vashchuk
CB	2	Andriy Nesmachniy
RM	8	Oleh Shelayev
CM	14	Andriy Husin
LM	4	Anatoliy Tymoschuk
AM	16	Andriy Vorobei	(substituted off) 94'
AM	19	Maksym Kalynychenko	(substituted off) 75'
SS	10	Andriy Voronin	(substituted off) 111'
CF	7	Andriy Shevchenko (c)
Substitutions:
MF	21	Ruslan Rotan	(substituted on) 75'
FW	11	Serhii Rebrov	(substituted on) 94'
FW	15	Artem Milevskyi	(substituted on) 111'
Manager:
Oleg Blokhin

Man of the Match:
Oleksandr Shovkovskyi (Ukraine)

Assistant referees:
José Ramírez (Mexico)
Héctor Vergara (Canada)
Fourth official:
Jerome Damon (South Africa)
Fifth official:
Justice Yeboah (Ghana)

=== 2010 FIFA World Cup ===
Switzerland were the only team to beat eventual world champion Spain, by a 0–1 victory in the group stage. In spite of this, they did not survive the first round.

Pos	Team	Pld	W	D	L	GF	GA	GD	Pts	Qualification
1	Spain	3	2	0	1	4	2	+2	6	Advance to knockout stage
2	Chile	3	2	0	1	3	2	+1	6	Advance to knockout stage
3	Switzerland	3	1	1	1	1	1	0	4	
4	Honduras	3	0	1	2	0	3	−3	1	

Source: FIFA
Rules for classification: Tie-breaking criteria
16 June 2010 (first round)
16:00

Spain	0–1	Switzerland
	Report	Fernandes 52'

Moses Mabhida Stadium, Durban
Attendance: 62,453
Referee: Howard Webb (England)

Spain	Switzerland

GK	1	Iker Casillas (c)
RB	15	Sergio Ramos
CB	5	Carles Puyol
CB	3	Gerard Piqué
LB	11	Joan Capdevila
DM	16	Sergio Busquets	(substituted off) 61'
CM	14	Xabi Alonso
CM	8	Xavi
RW	21	David Silva	(substituted off) 62'
LW	6	Andrés Iniesta	(substituted off) 77'
CF	7	David Villa
Substitutions:
FW	9	Fernando Torres	(substituted on) 61'
MF	22	Jesús Navas	(substituted on) 62'
FW	18	Pedro	(substituted on) 77'
Manager:
Vicente del Bosque

GK	1	Diego Benaglio	(yellow card) 90+1'
RB	2	Stephan Lichtsteiner
CB	4	Philippe Senderos		(substituted off) 36'
CB	13	Stéphane Grichting	(yellow card) 30'
LB	17	Reto Ziegler	(yellow card) 73'
RM	7	Tranquillo Barnetta		(substituted off) 90+2'
CM	8	Gökhan Inler (c)
CM	6	Benjamin Huggel
LM	16	Gélson Fernandes
SS	19	Eren Derdiyok		(substituted off) 79'
CF	10	Blaise Nkufo
Substitutions:
DF	5	Steve von Bergen		(substituted on) 36'
MF	15	Hakan Yakin	(yellow card) 90+4'	(substituted on) 79'
DF	22	Mario Eggimann		(substituted on) 90+2'
Manager:
(Germany) Ottmar Hitzfeld

Man of the Match:
Gélson Fernandes (Switzerland)

Assistant referees:
Darren Cann (England)
Mike Mullarkey (England)
Fourth official:
Martin Hansson (Sweden)
Fifth official:
Stefan Wittberg (Sweden)

21 June 2010 (first round)
16:00

Chile	1–0	Switzerland
González 75'	Report

Nelson Mandela Bay Stadium, Port Elizabeth
Attendance: 34,872
Referee: Khalil Al Ghamdi (Saudi Arabia)

Chile	Switzerland

GK	1	Claudio Bravo (c)
RB	4	Mauricio Isla
CB	17	Gary Medel	(yellow card) 61'
CB	3	Waldo Ponce	(yellow card) 25'
LB	18	Gonzalo Jara
RM	8	Arturo Vidal		(substituted off) 46'
CM	6	Carlos Carmona	(yellow card) 22'
LM	14	Matías Fernández	(yellow card) 60'	(substituted off) 65'
RW	7	Alexis Sánchez
CF	9	Humberto Suazo	(yellow card) 2'	(substituted off) 46'
LW	15	Jean Beausejour
Substitutions:
FW	10	Jorge Valdivia	(yellow card) 90+2'	(substituted on) 46'
MF	11	Mark González		(substituted on) 46'
FW	22	Esteban Paredes		(substituted on) 65'
Manager:
(Argentina) Marcelo Bielsa

GK	1	Diego Benaglio
RB	2	Stephan Lichtsteiner
CB	5	Steve von Bergen
CB	13	Stéphane Grichting
LB	17	Reto Ziegler
RM	11	Valon Behrami	(red card) 31'
CM	8	Gökhan Inler	(yellow card) 60'
CM	6	Benjamin Huggel
LM	16	Gélson Fernandes		(substituted off) 77'
SS	9	Alexander Frei (c)		(substituted off) 42'
CF	10	Blaise Nkufo	(yellow card) 18'	(substituted off) 68'
Substitutions:
MF	7	Tranquillo Barnetta	(yellow card) 48'	(substituted on) 42'
FW	19	Eren Derdiyok		(substituted on) 68'
FW	18	Albert Bunjaku		(substituted on) 77'
Manager:
(Germany) Ottmar Hitzfeld

Man of the Match:
Mark González (Chile)

Assistant referees:
Hassan Kamranifar (Iran)
Saleh Al Marzouqi (United Arab Emirates)
Fourth official:
Martín Vázquez (Uruguay)
Fifth official:
Miguel Nievas (Uruguay)

25 June 2010 (first round)
20:30

Switzerland	0–0	Honduras
	Report

Free State Stadium, Bloemfontein
Attendance: 28,042
Referee: Héctor Baldassi (Argentina)

Switzerland	Honduras

GK	1	Diego Benaglio
RB	2	Stephan Lichtsteiner
CB	5	Steve von Bergen
CB	13	Stéphane Grichting
LB	17	Reto Ziegler
RM	7	Tranquillo Barnetta
CM	6	Benjamin Huggel		(substituted off) 78'
CM	8	Gökhan Inler (c)
LM	16	Gélson Fernandes	(yellow card) 34'	(substituted off) 46'
CF	19	Eren Derdiyok
CF	10	Blaise Nkufo		(substituted off) 69'
Substitutions:
MF	15	Hakan Yakin		(substituted on) 46'
FW	9	Alexander Frei		(substituted on) 69'
MF	23	Xherdan Shaqiri		(substituted on) 78'
Manager:
(Germany) Ottmar Hitzfeld

GK	18	Noel Valladares (c)
RB	16	Mauricio Sabillón
CB	2	Osman Chávez	(yellow card) 64'
CB	5	Víctor Bernárdez
LB	3	Maynor Figueroa
CM	8	Wilson Palacios	(yellow card) 89'
CM	6	Hendry Thomas	(yellow card) 4'
RW	17	Edgar Álvarez
LW	7	Ramón Núñez		(substituted off) 67'
CF	10	Jerry Palacios		(substituted off) 78'
CF	11	David Suazo	(yellow card) 58'	(substituted off) 87'
Substitutions:
FW	15	Walter Martínez		(substituted on) 67'
FW	12	Georgie Welcome		(substituted on) 78'
MF	19	Danilo Turcios		(substituted on) 87'
Manager:
(Colombia) Reinaldo Rueda

Man of the Match:
Noel Valladares (Honduras)

Assistant referees:
Ricardo Casas (Argentina)
Hernan Maidana (Argentina)
Fourth official:
Olegário Benquerença (Portugal)
Fifth official:
Jose Manuel Silva Cardinal (Portugal)

=== 2014 FIFA World Cup ===
At the 2014 FIFA World Cup, Switzerland were drawn in Group E along with Ecuador, France, and Honduras. They opened their campaign with a 2–1 victory over Ecuador in Brasília. However, in their next match, they suffered a 5–2 defeat to France. Despite the initial setback, a 3–0 victory in their final game against Honduras, courtesy of a hat-trick by Xherdan Shaqiri sent them into the round of 16, where they faced the two-time world champions and eventual runners-up Argentina.

The game was goalless and nearly heading to penalties when Ángel Di María scored a 118th-minute extra time goal to send Argentina into the quarter-finals. Despite being eliminated in the round of 16, it was Switzerland's best performance in eight years.

Legend
Group winners and runners-up advance to the round of 16

Pos	Team	Pld	W	D	L	GF	GA	GD	Pts	Qualification
1	France	3	2	1	0	8	2	+6	7	Advance to knockout stage
2	Switzerland	3	2	0	1	7	6	+1	6	Advance to knockout stage
3	Ecuador	3	1	1	1	3	3	0	4	
4	Honduras	3	0	0	3	1	8	−7	0	

Source: FIFA
Rules for classification: Tie-breaking criteria

All times local: five matches are in Brasília official time (UTC−3), while Honduras v Switzerland, played in Manaus, is in the Amazon time zone (UTC−4).

15 June 2014
13:00

Switzerland	2–1	Ecuador
Mehmedi 48'; Seferovic 90+3'	Report	E. Valencia 22'

Estádio Nacional Mané Garrincha, Brasília
Attendance: 68,351
Referee: Ravshan Irmatov (Uzbekistan)

20 June 2014
16:00

Switzerland	2–5	France
Džemaili 81'; Xhaka 87'	Report	Giroud 17'; Matuidi 18'; Valbuena 40'; Benzema 67'; Sissoko 73'

Arena Fonte Nova, Salvador
Attendance: 51,003
Referee: Björn Kuipers (Netherlands)

25 June 2014
16:00 UTC−4

Honduras	0–3	Switzerland
	Report	Shaqiri 6', 31', 71'

Arena da Amazônia, Manaus
Attendance: 40,322
Referee: Néstor Pitana (Argentina)

1 July 2014
13:00 UTC−3

Argentina	1–0 (a.e.t.)	Switzerland
Di María 118'	Report

Arena Corinthians, São Paulo
Attendance: 63,255
Referee: Jonas Eriksson (Sweden)

=== 2026 FIFA World Cup ===
==== Group B ====
Pos	Team	Pld	W	D	L	GF	GA	GD	Pts	Qualification
1	Switzerland	3	2	1	0	7	3	+4	7	Advance to knockout stage
2	Canada (H)	3	1	1	1	8	3	+5	4 (Note: Tied on head-to-head result (Canada 1–1 Bosnia and Herzegovina). Overall goal difference was used as the tiebreaker.)	Advance to knockout stage
3	Bosnia and Herzegovina	3	1	1	1	5	6	−1	4	Advance to knockout stage
4	Qatar	3	0	1	2	2	10	−8	1	

Source: FIFA
Rules for classification: Group stage tiebreakers
(H) Hosts
Notes:
June 13, 2026
12:00 p.m. UTC−7

Qatar	1–1	Switzerland
Muheim 90+4' (o.g.)	(Note: "Qatar vs Switzerland | First Stage | FIFA World Cup 2026". FIFA. Retrieved June 13, 2026.; "Match Report – Group B – Qatar v. Switzerland". FIFA. June 13, 2026. Retrieved June 13, 2026.; "Post match summary report – Group B – Qatar v. Switzerland". FIFA. June 13, 2026. Retrieved June 14, 2026.)	Embolo 17' (pen.)

Levi's Stadium, Santa Clara
Attendance: 67,966
Referee: Saíd Martínez (Honduras)

June 18, 2026
12:00 p.m. UTC−7

Switzerland	4–1	Bosnia and Herzegovina
Manzambi 74', 90'; Vargas 84'; Xhaka 90+7' (pen.)	(Note: "Switzerland vs Bosnia and Herzegovina | First Stage | FIFA World Cup 2026". FIFA. Retrieved June 18, 2026.; "Match Report – Group B – Switzerland v. Bosnia and Herzegovina". FIFA. June 18, 2026. Retrieved June 18, 2026.; "Post match summary report – Group B – Switzerland v. Bosnia and Herzegovina". FIFA. June 18, 2026. Retrieved June 19, 2026.)	Mahmić 90+3'

SoFi Stadium, Inglewood
Attendance: 70,026
Referee: João Pinheiro (Portugal)

June 24, 2026
12:00 p.m. UTC−7

Switzerland	2–1	Canada
Vargas 46'; Manzambi 57'	(Note: "Switzerland vs Canada | First Stage | FIFA World Cup 2026". FIFA. Retrieved June 24, 2026.; "Match Report – Group B – Switzerland v. Canada". FIFA. June 24, 2026. Retrieved June 24, 2026.; "Post match summary report – Group B – Switzerland v. Canada". FIFA. June 25, 2026. Retrieved June 25, 2026.)	P. David 76'

BC Place, Vancouver
Attendance: 52,497
Referee: Ramon Abatti (Brazil)

==== Knockout stage ====
Round of 32

July 2, 2026
8:00 p.m. UTC−7

Switzerland	2–0	Algeria
Embolo 10'; Ndoye 46'	(Note: "Switzerland vs Algeria | Round of 32 | FIFA World Cup 2026". FIFA. Retrieved July 3, 2026.; "Match Report – Round of 32 – Switzerland v. Algeria". FIFA. July 3, 2026. Retrieved July 3, 2026.; "Post match summary report – Round of 32 – Switzerland v. Algeria". FIFA. July 3, 2026. Retrieved July 3, 2026.)

BC Place, Vancouver
Attendance: 52,497
Referee: Yael Falcón (Argentina)

Round of 16

July 7, 2026
1:00 p.m. UTC−7

Switzerland	0–0 (a.e.t.)	Colombia
	(Note: "Switzerland vs Colombia | Round of 16 | FIFA World Cup 2026". FIFA. Retrieved July 7, 2026.; "Match Report – Round of 16 – Switzerland v. Colombia". FIFA. July 7, 2026. Retrieved July 7, 2026.; "Post match summary report – Round of 16 – Switzerland v. Colombia". FIFA. July 7, 2026. Retrieved July 9, 2026.)
Penalties
Xhaka (penalty scored); Amdouni (penalty scored); Akanji (penalty missed); Itten (penalty scored); Vargas (penalty scored)	4–3	(penalty scored) Quintero; (penalty missed) Sánchez; (penalty scored) Campaz; (penalty missed) Hernández; (penalty scored) Díaz

BC Place, Vancouver
Attendance: 52,497
Referee: Iván Barton (El Salvador)

Quarter-finals

July 11, 2026
8:00 p.m. UTC−5

Argentina	3–1 (a.e.t.)	Switzerland
Mac Allister 10'; Alvarez 112'; La. Martínez 120+1'	(Note: "Argentina vs Switzerland | Quarter-final | FIFA World Cup 2026". FIFA. Retrieved July 12, 2026.; "Match Report – Quarter-final – Argentina v. Switzerland". FIFA. July 12, 2026. Retrieved July 12, 2026.; "Post match summary report – Quarter-final – Argentina v. Switzerland". FIFA. July 12, 2026. Retrieved July 12, 2026.)	Ndoye 67'

Arrowhead Stadium, Kansas City
Attendance: 69,045
Referee: João Pinheiro (Portugal)

== Player records ==
=== Most appearances ===
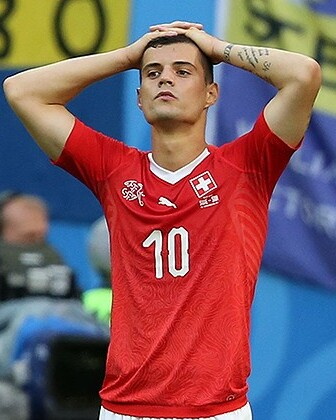
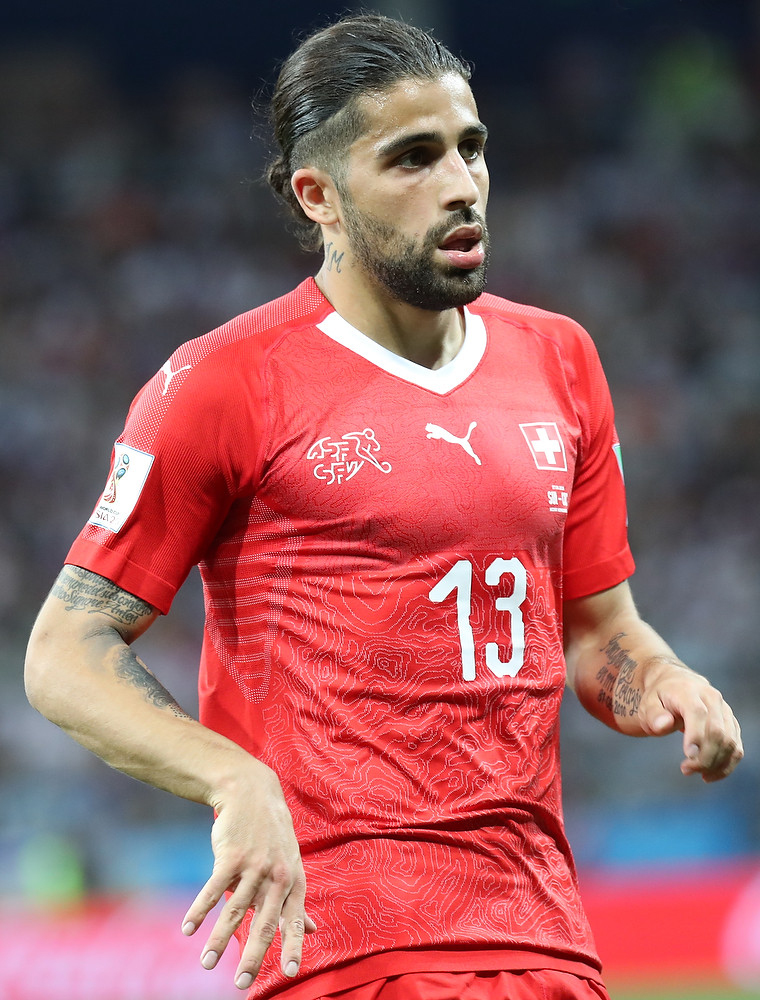
Granit Xhaka and Ricardo Rodriguez became Switzerland's joint record holders for World Cup appearances.

Rank	Player	Matches	World Cups
1	Ricardo Rodriguez	18	2014, 2018, 2022 and 2026
1	Granit Xhaka	18	2014, 2018, 2022 and 2026
3	Manuel Akanji	14	2018, 2022 and 2026
3	Breel Embolo	14	2018, 2022 and 2026
5	Xherdan Shaqiri	12	2010, 2014, 2018 and 2022
6	Valon Behrami	10	2006, 2010, 2014 and 2018
6	Stephan Lichtsteiner	10	2010, 2014 and 2018
6	Haris Seferovic	10	2014, 2018 and 2022
6	Remo Freuler	10	2018, 2022 and 2026
6	Rubén Vargas	10	2022 and 2026

=== Goalscorers ===
With six goals at Switzerland's home tournament in 1954, Josef Hügi won the shared Silver Boot; the only individual FIFA World Cup award ever received by a Swiss player.

Player	Goals	1934	1938	1950	1954	1962	1966	1994	2006	2010	2014	2018	2022	2026
Josef Hügi	6				6									
Xherdan Shaqiri	5										3	1	1	
André Abegglen	4	1	3											
Robert Ballaman	4				4									
Breel Embolo	4												2	2
Leopold Kielholz	3	3												
Jacques Fatton	3			2	1									
Granit Xhaka	3										1	1		1
Johan Manzambi	3													3
Adrian Knup	2							2						
Alexander Frei	2								2					
Blerim Džemaili	2										1	1		
Rubén Vargas	2													2
Dan Ndoye	2													2
Willy Jäggi	1	1												
Eugen Walaschek	1		1											
Alfred Bickel	1		1											
René Bader	1			1										
Charles Antenen	1			1										
Rolf Wüthrich	1					1								
Heinz Schneiter	1					1								
René-Pierre Quentin	1						1							
Georges Bregy	1							1						
Alain Sutter	1							1						
Stéphane Chapuisat	1							1						
Tranquillo Barnetta	1								1					
Philippe Senderos	1								1					
Gelson Fernandes	1									1				
Admir Mehmedi	1										1			
Haris Seferovic	1										1			
Steven Zuber	1											1		
Josip Drmić	1											1		
Remo Freuler	1												1	
Total	64	5	5	4	11	2	1	5	4	1	7	5	4	10

== See also ==
- Switzerland at the UEFA European Championship
