= Serbia at the FIFA World Cup =

International football delegation

This is a record of Serbia's results at the FIFA World Cup, including as their predecessor teams Yugoslavia (1920–1992) and Serbia and Montenegro (1996–2006; the country was renamed from "Federal Republic of Yugoslavia" in 2003). FIFA recognizes Serbia as the official successor of the Yugoslav teams, and thus inherits all Yugoslavia's and Serbia and Montenegro's records.

Including their predecessors' records, Serbia has qualified for thirteen FIFA World Cup finals tournaments, last failing to do so in 2026.

== FIFA World Cup record ==
FIFA World Cup record									Qualification record					
Year	Round	Position	Pld	W	D	L	GF	GA	Pld	W	D	L	GF	GA
as part of Yugoslavia
(Uruguay) 1930	Fourth place	4th	3	2	0	1	7	7	Invited					
(Italy) 1934	Did not qualify								2	0	1	1	3	4
(France) 1938	Did not qualify								2	1	0	1	1	4
(Brazil) 1950	Group stage	5th	3	2	0	1	7	3	5	3	2	0	16	6
(Switzerland) 1954	Quarter-finals	7th	3	1	1	1	2	3	4	4	0	0	4	0
(Sweden) 1958	Quarter-finals	5th	4	1	2	1	7	7	4	2	2	0	7	2
(Chile) 1962	Fourth place	4th	6	3	0	3	10	7	4	3	1	0	11	4
(England) 1966	Did not qualify								6	3	1	2	10	8
(Mexico) 1970	Did not qualify								6	3	1	2	19	7
(West Germany) 1974	Quarter-finals (Note: Last 8 held as second group stage.)	7th	6	1	2	3	12	7	5	3	2	0	8	4
(Argentina) 1978	Did not qualify								4	1	0	3	6	8
(Spain) 1982	Group stage	16th	3	1	1	1	2	2	8	6	1	1	22	7
(Mexico) 1986	Did not qualify								8	3	2	3	7	8
(Italy) 1990	Quarter-finals	5th	5	3	1	1	8	6	8	6	2	0	16	6
as part of FR Yugoslavia / Serbia and Montenegro
(United States) 1994	Suspended (Note: Draw for 1994 FIFA World Cup qualifiers was made on 8 December 1991, however due to break-up of Socialist Federal Republic of Yugoslavia and consequent military conflict, which broke in early 1991, FSJ ceased to exist as football organization of the SFR Yugoslavia. Organization that remained based in Belgrade, Serbia, was excluded from taking part as FSJ or its successor due to UN sanctions.)								0	0	0	0	0	0
(France) 1998	Round of 16	10th	4	2	1	1	5	4	12	9	2	1	41	8
(South Korea) (Japan) 2002	Did not qualify								10	5	4	1	22	8
(Germany) 2006	Group stage	32nd	3	0	0	3	2	10	10	6	4	0	16	1
as Serbia
(South Africa) 2010	Group stage	23rd	3	1	0	2	2	3	10	7	1	2	22	8
(Brazil) 2014	Did not qualify								10	4	2	4	18	11
(Russia) 2018	Group stage	23rd	3	1	0	2	2	4	10	6	3	1	20	10
(Qatar) 2022	Group stage	29th	3	0	1	2	5	8	8	6	2	0	18	9
(Canada) (Mexico) (United States) 2026	Did not qualify								8	4	1	3	9	10
(Morocco) (Portugal) (Spain) 2030	To be determined								To be determined					
(Saudi Arabia) 2034	To be determined								To be determined					
Total	Fourth place	13/23	49	18	9	22	71	71	144	85	34	25	296	133

Serbia's World Cup record
First match	(Kingdom of Yugoslavia) Yugoslavia 2–1 Brazil (14 July 1930; Montevideo, Uruguay)
Biggest Win	Yugoslavia 9–0 Zaire (7 June 1974; Gelsenkirchen, West Germany)
Biggest Defeat	Argentina 6–0 Serbia and Montenegro (16 June 2006; Gelsenkirchen, Germany)
Best Result	Fourth place in 1930 and 1962
Worst Result	Group stage in 1950, 1982, 2006, 2010, 2018, and 2022

== By match ==
World Cup	Round	Opponent	Score	Result	Serbia scorers
within Kingdom of Yugoslavia (1930)
1930	Group stage	Brazil	2–1	W	Tirnanić, Bek
1930	Group stage	Bolivia	4–0	W	Bek (2), Marjanović, Vujadinović
1930	Semi-final	Uruguay	1–6	L	Vujadinović
within SFR Yugoslavia (1950–1990)
1950	Group stage	Switzerland	3–0	W	Mitić, Tomašević, Ognjanov
1950	Group stage	Mexico	4–1	W	Bobek, Ž. Čajkovski (2), Tomašević
1950	Group stage	Brazil	0–2	L	—
1954	Group stage	France	1–0	W	Milutinović
1954	Group stage	Brazil	1–1	D	Zebec
1954	Quarter-final	West Germany	0–2	L	—
1958	Group stage	Scotland	1–1	D	Petaković
1958	Group stage	France	3–2	W	Petaković, Veselinović (2)
1958	Group stage	Paraguay	3–3	D	Ognjanović, Veselinović, Rajkov
1958	Quarter-final	West Germany	0–1	L	—
1962	Group stage	Soviet Union	0–2	L	—
1962	Group stage	Uruguay	3–1	W	Skoblar, Galić, Jerković
1962	Group stage	Colombia	5–0	W	Galić (2), Jerković (2), Melić
1962	Quarter-final	West Germany	1–0	W	Radaković
1962	Semi-final	Czechoslovakia	1–3	L	Jerković
1962	Match for third place	Chile	0–1	L	—
1974	Group stage	Brazil	0–0	D	—
1974	Group stage	Zaire	9–0	W	Bajević (3), Džajić, Šurjak, Katalinski, Bogićević, Oblak, Petković
1974	Group stage	Scotland	1–1	D	Karasi
1974	Second round	West Germany	0–2	L	—
1974	Second round	Poland	1–2	L	Karasi
1974	Second round	Sweden	1–2	L	Šurjak
1982	Group stage	Northern Ireland	0–0	D	—
1982	Group stage	Spain	1–2	L	Gudelj
1982	Group stage	Honduras	1–0	W	Petrović
1990	Group stage	West Germany	1–4	L	Jozić
1990	Group stage	Colombia	1–0	W	Jozić
1990	Group stage	United Arab Emirates	4–1	W	Sušić, Pančev (2), Prosinečki
1990	Round of 16	Spain	2–1 (a.e.t.)	W	Stojković (2)
1990	Quarter-final	Argentina	0–0 (2–3p)	D	
within Serbia and Montenegro (1998–2006; 1998 as FR Yugoslavia)
1998	Group stage	Iran	1–0	W	Mihajlović
1998	Group stage	Germany	2–2	D	Mijatović, Stojković
1998	Group stage	United States	1–0	W	Komljenović
1998	Round of 16	Netherlands	1–2	L	Komljenović
2006	Group stage	Netherlands	0–1	L	—
2006	Group stage	Argentina	0–6	L	—
2006	Group stage	Ivory Coast	2–3	L	Žigić, Ilić
Serbia (since 2010)
2010	Group stage	Ghana	0–1	L	—
2010	Group stage	Germany	1–0	W	Jovanović
2010	Group stage	Australia	1–2	L	Pantelić
2018	Group stage	Costa Rica	1–0	W	Kolarov
2018	Group stage	Switzerland	1–2	L	A. Mitrović
2018	Group stage	Brazil	0–2	L	—
2022	Group stage	Brazil	0–2	L	—
2022	Group stage	Cameroon	3–3	D	Pavlović, S. Milinković-Savić, A. Mitrović
2022	Group stage	Switzerland	2–3	L	A. Mitrović, Vlahović

== Player records ==
=== Most appearances ===
Rank	Player	Matches	World Cups
1	Dragoslav Šekularac	9	1958 and 1962
1	Ivica Šurjak	9	1974 and 1982
1	Dragan Stojković	9	1990 and 1998
1	Dejan Stanković	9	1998, 2006 and 2010
5	Safet Sušić	8	1982 and 1990
5	Zlatko Vujović	8	1982 and 1990
7	Vujadin Boškov	7	1954 and 1958
8	Rajko Mitić	6	1950 and 1954
8	Branko Stanković	6	1950 and 1954
8	Miloš Milutinović	6	1954 and 1958
8	Vladica Popović	6	1958 and 1962
8	Vladimir Durković	6	1962
8	Milan Galić	6	1962
8	Milutin Šoškić	6	1962
8	Jovan Aćimović	6	1974
8	Vladimir Stojković	6	2010 and 2018
8	Nikola Milenković	6	2018 and 2022
8	Sergej Milinković-Savić	6	2018 and 2022
8	Aleksandar Mitrović	6	2018 and 2022
8	Dušan Tadić	6	2018 and 2022

=== Top goalscorers ===
https://www.elastecworkboats.com/aluminum-landing-craft/

== See also ==
- Serbia at the UEFA European Championship
