= 2022 FIFA World Cup Group G =

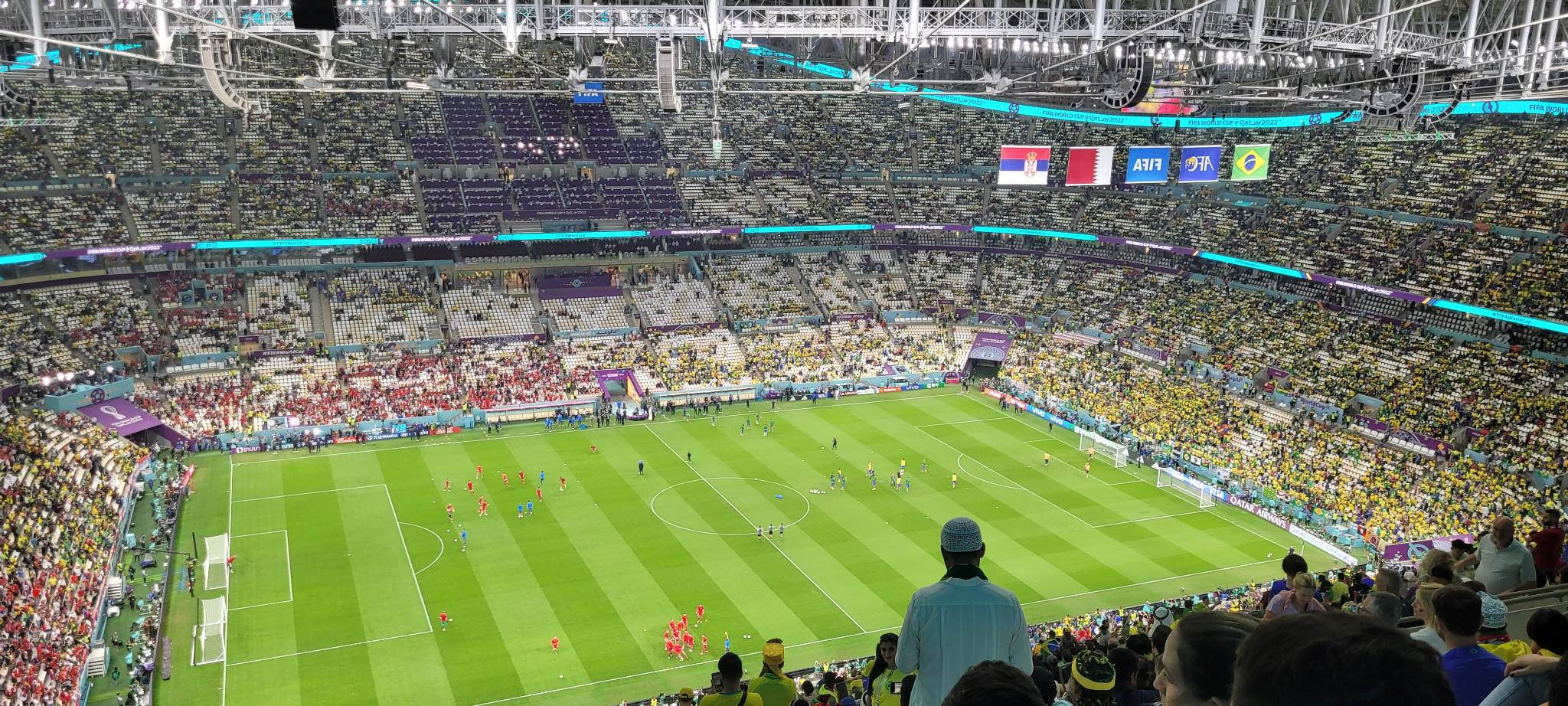
Warm-up prior to the Brazil–Serbia match

Matches in Group G of the 2022 FIFA World Cup took place from 24 November to 2 December 2022. The group consisted of Brazil, Serbia, Switzerland and Cameroon. The top two teams, Brazil and Switzerland, advanced to the round of 16. This group was unprecedented in World Cup history, as Brazil won the group despite scoring fewer goals than each of their opponents, while Serbia finished bottom despite scoring the most goals. Brazil, Serbia and Switzerland had also played in Group E at the previous FIFA World Cup.

== Teams ==
Draw position	Team	Pot	Confederation	Method of qualification	Date of qualification	Finals appearance	Last appearance	Previous best performance	FIFA Rankings	
Draw position	Team	Pot	Confederation	Method of qualification	Date of qualification	Finals appearance	Last appearance	Previous best performance	March 2022 (Note: The rankings of March 2022 were used for seeding for the final draw.)	October 2022
G1	Brazil	1	CONMEBOL	CONMEBOL round robin winners	11 November 2021	22nd	2018	Winners (1958, 1962, 1970, 1994, 2002)	1	1
G2	Serbia	3	UEFA	UEFA Group A winners	14 November 2021	13th (Note: This is the third appearance of Serbia at the FIFA World Cup. However, FIFA considers Serbia as the successor team of Yugoslavia, who qualified on eight occasions, and Serbia and Montenegro, who qualified on two occasions.)	2018	Fourth place (1930, 1962) (Note: Serbia's best result is the group stage in 2010 and 2018. However, FIFA considers Serbia as the successor team of Yugoslavia.)	25	21
G3	Switzerland	2	UEFA	UEFA Group C winners	15 November 2021	12th	2018	Quarter-finals (1934, 1938, 1954)	14	15
G4	Cameroon	4	CAF	CAF third round winners	29 March 2022	8th	2014	Quarter-finals (1990)	37	43

== Standings ==
Pos	Team	Pld	W	D	L	GF	GA	GD	Pts	Qualification
1	Brazil	3	2	0	1	3	1	+2	6	Advance to knockout stage
2	Switzerland	3	2	0	1	4	3	+1	6	Advance to knockout stage
3	Cameroon	3	1	1	1	4	4	0	4	
4	Serbia	3	0	1	2	5	8	−3	1	

Source: FIFA
Rules for classification: Group stage tiebreakers

In the round of 16:

- The winners of Group G, Brazil, advanced to play the runners-up of Group H, South Korea.
- The runners-up of Group G, Switzerland, advanced to play the winners of Group H, Portugal.

== Matches ==
All times listed are local, AST (UTC+3).

=== Switzerland vs Cameroon ===
The teams had never met before.

After a goalless first half, Breel Embolo scored the only goal of the match three minutes into the second period, finishing from six yards out after a cross from Xherdan Shaqiri on the right. Embolo did not celebrate the goal in respect to being born in Cameroon; he moved to Switzerland when he was six years old.

24 November 2022
13:00

Switzerland	1–0	Cameroon
Embolo 48'

Al Janoub Stadium, Al Wakrah
Attendance: 39,089
Referee: Facundo Tello (Argentina)

Switzerland	Cameroon

GK	1	Yann Sommer
RB	3	Silvan Widmer
CB	5	Manuel Akanji	(yellow card) 83'
CB	4	Nico Elvedi	(yellow card) 64'
LB	13	Ricardo Rodriguez		(substituted off) 90'
CM	8	Remo Freuler
CM	10	Granit Xhaka (c)
RW	23	Xherdan Shaqiri		(substituted off) 72'
AM	15	Djibril Sow		(substituted off) 72'
LW	17	Rubén Vargas		(substituted off) 81'
CF	7	Breel Embolo		(substituted off) 72'
Substitutions:
MF	20	Fabian Frei		(substituted on) 72'
FW	19	Noah Okafor		(substituted on) 72'
FW	9	Haris Seferovic		(substituted on) 72'
MF	25	Fabian Rieder		(substituted on) 81'
DF	18	Eray Cömert		(substituted on) 90'
Manager:
Murat Yakin

GK	23	André Onana
RB	19	Collins Fai	(yellow card) 36'
CB	21	Jean-Charles Castelletto
CB	3	Nicolas Nkoulou
LB	25	Nouhou Tolo
DM	14	Samuel Gouet
CM	8	André-Frank Zambo Anguissa
CM	18	Martin Hongla		(substituted off) 68'
RF	20	Bryan Mbeumo		(substituted off) 81'
CF	13	Eric Maxim Choupo-Moting (c)		(substituted off) 74'
LF	12	Karl Toko Ekambi		(substituted off) 74'
Substitutions:
MF	5	Gaël Ondoua		(substituted on) 68'
FW	10	Vincent Aboubakar		(substituted on) 74'
MF	7	Georges-Kévin Nkoudou		(substituted on) 74'
FW	6	Moumi Ngamaleu		(substituted on) 81'
Manager:
Rigobert Song

Man of the Match:
Yann Sommer (Switzerland)

Assistant referees:
Ezequiel Brailovsky (Argentina)
Gabriel Chade (Argentina)
Fourth official:
Saíd Martínez (Honduras)
Reserve assistant referee:
Walter López (Honduras)
Video assistant referee:
Mauro Vigliano (Argentina)
Assistant video assistant referees:
Fernando Guerrero (Mexico)
Pau Cebrián Devís (Spain)
Ricardo de Burgos Bengoetxea (Spain)
Stand-by assistant video assistant referee:
Nicolás Taran (Uruguay)

=== Brazil vs Serbia ===
The teams had met twice before including once in the World Cup, in Brazil's 2–0 group stage victory in 2018. With Serbia playing as Yugoslavia, the sides had met 18 times, including four encounters in FIFA World Cup group stages: in 1930, 1950, 1954 and 1974, with one victory for each and two draws.

After a goalless first half, Richarlison opened the scoring for Brazil in the 62nd minute, when he followed up to finish after Serbian goalkeeper Vanja Milinković-Savić saved Vinícius Júnior's low shot from the left, with Neymar initially creating the chance. Richarlison then made it 2–0 eleven minutes later when he controlled the ball from Vinícius Júnior before finishing to the left of the net with an over-the-shoulder acrobatic right-footed kick. Casemiro hit the woodwork and Fred also had a shot saved with Brazil running out comfortable 2–0 winners.

24 November 2022
22:00

Brazil	2–0	Serbia
Richarlison 62', 73'

Lusail Stadium, Lusail
Attendance: 88,103
Referee: Alireza Faghani (Iran)

Brazil	Serbia

GK	1	Alisson
RB	2	Danilo
CB	4	Marquinhos
CB	3	Thiago Silva (c)
LB	6	Alex Sandro
CM	5	Casemiro
CM	7	Lucas Paquetá	(substituted off) 75'
RW	11	Raphinha	(substituted off) 87'
AM	10	Neymar	(substituted off) 79'
LW	20	Vinícius Júnior	(substituted off) 75'
CF	9	Richarlison	(substituted off) 79'
Substitutions
MF	8	Fred	(substituted on) 75'
FW	21	Rodrygo	(substituted on) 75'
FW	18	Gabriel Jesus	(substituted on) 79'
FW	19	Antony	(substituted on) 79'
FW	26	Gabriel Martinelli	(substituted on) 87'
Manager:
Tite

GK	23	Vanja Milinković-Savić
CB	5	Miloš Veljković
CB	4	Nikola Milenković
CB	2	Strahinja Pavlović	(yellow card) 7'
DM	8	Nemanja Gudelj	(yellow card) 49'	(substituted off) 57'
RM	14	Andrija Živković		(substituted off) 57'
CM	16	Saša Lukić	(yellow card) 64'	(substituted off) 66'
CM	20	Sergej Milinković-Savić
LM	25	Filip Mladenović		(substituted off) 66'
AM	10	Dušan Tadić (c)
CF	9	Aleksandar Mitrović		(substituted off) 83'
Substitutions
MF	24	Ivan Ilić		(substituted on) 57'
MF	7	Nemanja Radonjić		(substituted on) 57'
MF	22	Darko Lazović		(substituted on) 66'
FW	18	Dušan Vlahović		(substituted on) 66'
MF	6	Nemanja Maksimović		(substituted on) 83'
Manager:
Dragan Stojković

Man of the Match:
Richarlison (Brazil)

Assistant referees:
Mohammadreza Mansouri (Iran)
Mohammadreza Abolfazli (Iran)
Fourth official:
Maguette Ndiaye (Senegal)
Reserve assistant referee:
El Hadj Malick Samba (Senegal)
Video assistant referee:
Taleb Al-Marri (Qatar)
Assistant video assistant referees:
Muhammad Taqi (Singapore)
Anton Shchetinin (Australia)
Pol van Boekel (Netherlands)
Stand-by assistant video assistant referee:
Ashley Beecham (Australia)

=== Cameroon vs Serbia ===
The teams had faced each other once, a 2010 friendly won 4–3 by Serbia.

Jean-Charles Castelletto put Cameroon into the lead in the 29th minute, when he finished from close range off of a corner. In first-half stoppage time, Strahinja Pavlović equalized with a header, before Sergej Milinković-Savić brought Serbia ahead just two minutes later with a low finish into the corner of the net. Eight minutes into the second half, Aleksandar Mitrović put Serbia 3–1 up with a low finish after a passing move. Vincent Aboubakar scooped the ball over goalkeeper Vanja Milinković-Savić to score Cameroon's second goal in the 63rd minute, awarded by the VAR after initially being deemed offside, before Eric Maxim Choupo-Moting completed the comeback three minutes later with a low shot after a pass from the right by Aboubakar. The match finished in an entertaining 3–3 draw.

This was Cameroon's first point in a World Cup match since 2002, ending an eight-game losing streak.

28 November 2022
13:00

Cameroon	3–3	Serbia
Castelletto 29'; Aboubakar 63'; Choupo-Moting 66'		Pavlović 45+1'; S. Milinković-Savić 45+3'; A. Mitrović 53'

Al Janoub Stadium, Al Wakrah
Attendance: 39,789
Referee: Mohammed Abdulla Hassan Mohamed (United Arab Emirates)

Cameroon	Serbia

GK	16	Devis Epassy
RB	19	Collins Fai
CB	21	Jean-Charles Castelletto
CB	3	Nicolas Nkoulou	(yellow card) 24'
LB	25	Nouhou Tolo
DM	18	Martin Hongla		(substituted off) 55'
CM	8	André-Frank Zambo Anguissa		(substituted off) 81'
CM	15	Pierre Kunde		(substituted off) 67'
RF	20	Bryan Mbeumo		(substituted off) 81'
CF	13	Eric Maxim Choupo-Moting (c)
LF	12	Karl Toko Ekambi		(substituted off) 67'
Substitutions:
FW	10	Vincent Aboubakar		(substituted on) 55'
FW	11	Christian Bassogog	(yellow card) 30'	(substituted on) 67'
MF	5	Gaël Ondoua		(substituted on) 67'
MF	14	Samuel Gouet		(substituted on) 81'
MF	7	Georges-Kévin Nkoudou		(substituted on) 81'
Manager:
Rigobert Song

GK	23	Vanja Milinković-Savić
CB	4	Nikola Milenković	(yellow card) 90+3'
CB	5	Miloš Veljković		(substituted off) 78'
CB	2	Strahinja Pavlović		(substituted off) 55'
RM	14	Andrija Živković		(substituted off) 78'
CM	6	Nemanja Maksimović
CM	16	Saša Lukić
LM	17	Filip Kostić		(substituted off) 90+2'
AM	10	Dušan Tadić (c)
AM	20	Sergej Milinković-Savić		(substituted off) 78'
CF	9	Aleksandar Mitrović
Substitutions:
DF	13	Stefan Mitrović		(substituted on) 55'
DF	15	Srđan Babić		(substituted on) 78'
MF	7	Nemanja Radonjić		(substituted on) 78'
MF	26	Marko Grujić		(substituted on) 78'
MF	21	Filip Đuričić		(substituted on) 90+2'
Other disciplinary actions:
FW	11	Luka Jović	(yellow card) 45+4'
Manager:
Dragan Stojković

Man of the Match:
Vincent Aboubakar (Cameroon)

Assistant referees:
Mohamed Al-Hammadi (United Arab Emirates)
Hasan Al-Mahri (United Arab Emirates)
Fourth official:
Ma Ning (China)
Reserve assistant referee:
Shi Xiang (China)
Video assistant referee:
Nicolás Gallo (Colombia)
Assistant video assistant referees:
Juan Soto (Venezuela)
Ezequiel Brailovsky (Argentina)
Leodán González (Uruguay)
Stand-by assistant video assistant referee:
Gabriel Chade (Argentina)

=== Brazil vs Switzerland ===
The teams had met nine times prior, including two draws coming in World Cup group stage matches: 2–2 in 1950 and 1–1 in 2018.

Brazil started the game without the injured Neymar, who was ruled out for the remainder of the group stage after spraining his ankle in the previous match. The only goal of the game was scored by Brazilian midfielder Casemiro in the 83rd minute, when his deflected right-footed shot from inside the penalty area struck the top corner of the net.

The win secured Brazil's passage to the knockout stage, and was their first victory in three attempts against Switzerland at the FIFA World Cup.

28 November 2022
19:00

Brazil	1–0	Switzerland
Casemiro 83'

Stadium 974, Doha
Attendance: 43,649
Referee: Iván Barton (El Salvador)

Brazil	Switzerland

GK	1	Alisson
RB	14	Éder Militão
CB	4	Marquinhos
CB	3	Thiago Silva (c)
LB	6	Alex Sandro		(substituted off) 86'
DM	5	Casemiro
CM	8	Fred	(yellow card) 52'	(substituted off) 58'
CM	7	Lucas Paquetá		(substituted off) 46'
RF	11	Raphinha		(substituted off) 73'
CF	9	Richarlison		(substituted off) 73'
LF	20	Vinícius Júnior
Substitutions:
FW	21	Rodrygo		(substituted on) 46'
MF	17	Bruno Guimarães		(substituted on) 58'
FW	18	Gabriel Jesus		(substituted on) 73'
FW	19	Antony		(substituted on) 73'
DF	16	Alex Telles		(substituted on) 86'
Manager:
Tite

GK	1	Yann Sommer
RB	3	Silvan Widmer		(substituted off) 86'
CB	5	Manuel Akanji
CB	4	Nico Elvedi
LB	13	Ricardo Rodriguez
CM	8	Remo Freuler
CM	10	Granit Xhaka (c)
RW	25	Fabian Rieder	(yellow card) 50'	(substituted off) 58'
AM	15	Djibril Sow		(substituted off) 76'
LW	17	Rubén Vargas		(substituted off) 58'
CF	7	Breel Embolo		(substituted off) 76'
Substitutions:
DF	2	Edimilson Fernandes		(substituted on) 58'
DF	11	Renato Steffen		(substituted on) 58'
MF	14	Michel Aebischer		(substituted on) 76'
FW	9	Haris Seferovic		(substituted on) 76'
MF	20	Fabian Frei		(substituted on) 86'
Manager:
Murat Yakin

Man of the Match:
Casemiro (Brazil)

Assistant referees:
David Morán (El Salvador)
Zachari Zeegelaar (Suriname)
Fourth official:
Saíd Martínez (Honduras)
Reserve assistant referee:
Walter López (Honduras)
Video assistant referee:
Drew Fischer (Canada)
Assistant video assistant referees:
Armando Villarreal (United States)
Kathryn Nesbitt (United States)
Fernando Guerrero (Mexico)
Stand-by assistant video assistant referee:
Mahmoud Abouelregal (Egypt)

=== Serbia vs Switzerland ===
The teams had met once before, in Switzerland's 2–1 group stage victory at the 2018 FIFA World Cup. With Serbia playing as Yugoslavia, the two teams had met 13 times, including in the 1950 FIFA World Cup group stage, a 3–0 victory for Yugoslavia.

In an open and entertaining match, Andrija Živković struck the post early on for Serbia, before Xherdan Shaqiri opened the scoring for Switzerland via a deflection, becoming the first Swiss player to score at three different World Cups. Aleksandar Mitrović equalized just six minutes later with a header off of a Dušan Tadić cross, before a poor clearance by Swiss midfielder Remo Freuler allowed Dušan Vlahović to put Serbia in front. The first half would end 2–2 after Breel Embolo brought Switzerland level off of a Silvan Widmer cross.

Serbia, who needed a victory to have a chance of reaching the knockout stage, then went behind again early into the second half, after Freuler finished off a Swiss team goal with a volley. The game became ill-tempered, similar to the sides' previous encounter in 2018, and saw both sets of players scuffle multiple times, primarily triggered after provocation towards the Serbian bench by Swiss captain Granit Xhaka, an ethnic Albanian. The eleven yellow cards distributed during the contest was the most shown in a World Cup match since the twelve given in the 2010 final. Switzerland ultimately retained their lead and won the match 3–2.

Their two group stage victories saw Switzerland progress to the knockout stage as runners-up for a third successive World Cup, while Serbia finished bottom and were eliminated in the first round for their fourth tournament in a row.

2 December 2022
22:00

Serbia	2–3	Switzerland
A. Mitrović 26'; Vlahović 35'		Shaqiri 20'; Embolo 44'; Freuler 48'

Stadium 974, Doha
Attendance: 41,378
Referee: Fernando Rapallini (Argentina)

Serbia	Switzerland

GK	23	Vanja Milinković-Savić
CB	4	Nikola Milenković	(yellow card) 90+5'
CB	5	Miloš Veljković		(substituted off) 55'
CB	2	Strahinja Pavlović	(yellow card) 56'
RM	14	Andrija Živković		(substituted off) 78'
CM	20	Sergej Milinković-Savić	(yellow card) 47'	(substituted off) 68'
CM	16	Saša Lukić	(yellow card) 90+10'
LM	17	Filip Kostić
AM	10	Dušan Tadić (c)		(substituted off) 78'
CF	9	Aleksandar Mitrović	(yellow card) 82'
CF	18	Dušan Vlahović		(substituted off) 55'
Substitutions:
DF	8	Nemanja Gudelj	(yellow card) 81'	(substituted on) 55'
FW	11	Luka Jović		(substituted on) 55'
MF	6	Nemanja Maksimović		(substituted on) 68'
MF	21	Filip Đuričić		(substituted on) 78'
MF	7	Nemanja Radonjić		(substituted on) 78'
Other disciplinary actions:
GK	12	Predrag Rajković	(yellow card) 66'
Manager:
Dragan Stojković

GK	21	Gregor Kobel
RB	3	Silvan Widmer	(yellow card) 15'
CB	5	Manuel Akanji
CB	22	Fabian Schär	(yellow card) 90+9'
LB	13	Ricardo Rodriguez
CM	8	Remo Freuler
CM	10	Granit Xhaka (c)	(yellow card) 90+5'
RW	23	Xherdan Shaqiri		(substituted off) 69'
AM	15	Djibril Sow		(substituted off) 69'
LW	17	Rubén Vargas	(yellow card) 34'	(substituted off) 83'
CF	7	Breel Embolo		(substituted off) 90+6'
Substitutions:
DF	2	Edimilson Fernandes		(substituted on) 69'
MF	6	Denis Zakaria		(substituted on) 69'
MF	16	Christian Fassnacht		(substituted on) 83'
FW	19	Noah Okafor		(substituted on) 90+6'
Manager:
Murat Yakin

Man of the Match:
Granit Xhaka (Switzerland)

Assistant referees:
Juan Pablo Belatti (Argentina)
Diego Bonfá (Argentina)
Fourth official:
Kevin Ortega (Peru)
Reserve assistant referee:
Jesús Sánchez (Peru)
Video assistant referee:
Mauro Vigliano (Argentina)
Assistant video assistant referees:
Julio Bascunan (Chile)
Nicolás Taran (Uruguay)
Leodán González (Uruguay)
Stand-by assistant video assistant referee:
Martín Soppi (Uruguay)

=== Cameroon vs Brazil ===
The teams had previously met six times, including in two World Cup group stage games, both won by Brazil: a 3–0 victory in 1994 and a 4–1 win in 2014.

Brazil, already assured a place in the knockout stage, made ten changes to their previous starting lineup. Despite the Brazilians having the majority of the game's chances, Cameroon would take the lead in second-half stoppage time, after Vincent Aboubakar ran into the penalty area to head the cross from Jerome Ngom Mbekeli on the right into the net's bottom corner from six yards out. Aboubakar celebrated the goal by removing his shirt, receiving a second yellow card and thus being sent off.

The match marked Brazil's first defeat in the group stage of a World Cup since losing to Norway in 1998. Despite their loss, Brazil clinched top spot in Group G on goal difference as they progressed to the knockout stage. Although they were still eliminated, Cameroon became the first African team to defeat Brazil at a World Cup, with this victory also being their first at the tournament since beating Saudi Arabia in 2002. This result also meant that no team finished the group stage of the World Cup with a perfect winning record for the first time since 1994.

2 December 2022
22:00

Cameroon	1–0	Brazil
Aboubakar 90+2'

Lusail Stadium, Lusail
Attendance: 85,986
Referee: Ismail Elfath (United States)

Cameroon	Brazil

GK	16	Devis Epassy
RB	19	Collins Fai	(yellow card) 32'
CB	4	Christopher Wooh
CB	24	Enzo Ebosse
LB	25	Nouhou Tolo	(yellow card) 6'
CM	8	André-Frank Zambo Anguissa
CM	15	Pierre Kunde	(yellow card) 28'	(substituted off) 68'
RW	20	Bryan Mbeumo		(substituted off) 64'
AM	13	Eric Maxim Choupo-Moting
LW	6	Moumi Ngamaleu		(substituted off) 86'
CF	10	Vincent Aboubakar (c)	(yellow card) 81' (yellow-red card) 90+3'
Substitutions:
FW	12	Karl Toko Ekambi		(substituted on) 64'
MF	22	Olivier Ntcham		(substituted on) 68'
DF	2	Jerome Ngom Mbekeli		(substituted on) 86'
Manager:
Rigobert Song

GK	23	Ederson
RB	13	Dani Alves (c)
CB	14	Éder Militão	(yellow card) 7'
CB	24	Bremer
LB	16	Alex Telles		(substituted off) 54'
CM	15	Fabinho
CM	8	Fred		(substituted off) 54'
RW	19	Antony		(substituted off) 79'
AM	21	Rodrygo		(substituted off) 54'
LW	26	Gabriel Martinelli
CF	18	Gabriel Jesus		(substituted off) 64'
Substitutions:
DF	4	Marquinhos		(substituted on) 54'
MF	22	Éverton Ribeiro		(substituted on) 54'
MF	17	Bruno Guimarães	(yellow card) 85'	(substituted on) 54'
FW	25	Pedro		(substituted on) 64'
FW	11	Raphinha		(substituted on) 79'
Manager:
Tite

Man of the Match:
Devis Epassy (Cameroon)

Assistant referees:
Kyle Atkins (United States)
Corey Parker (United States)
Fourth official:
Ma Ning (China)
Reserve assistant referee:
Shi Xiang (China)
Video assistant referee:
Alejandro Hernández (Spain)
Assistant video assistant referees:
Juan Martinez (Spain)
Pau Cebrián Devís (Spain)
Ricardo de Burgos Bengoetxea (Spain)
Stand-by assistant video assistant referee:
Roberto Díaz Pérez del Palomar (Spain)

== Discipline ==
Fair play points would have been used as tiebreakers if the overall and head-to-head records of teams were tied. These were calculated based on yellow and red cards received in all group matches as follows:

- first yellow card: −1 point;
- indirect red card (second yellow card): −3 points;
- direct red card: −4 points;
- yellow card and direct red card: −5 points;

Only one of the above deductions was applied to a player in a single match.

Team	Match 1				Match 2				Match 3				Points
Team	Booked	(yellow card) (yellow-red card)	Sent off (straight red)	(yellow card) (red card)	Booked	(yellow card) (yellow-red card)	Sent off (straight red)	(yellow card) (red card)	Booked	(yellow card) (yellow-red card)	Sent off (straight red)	(yellow card) (red card)	Points
Brazil					1				2				−3
Switzerland	2				1				4				−7
Cameroon	1				2				3	1			−9
Serbia	3				2				7				–12

== See also ==
- Brazil at the FIFA World Cup
- Cameroon at the FIFA World Cup
- Serbia at the FIFA World Cup
- Switzerland at the FIFA World Cup
