= 2014 FIFA World Cup Group E =

Football tournament group stage

Group E of the 2014 FIFA World Cup consisted of Switzerland, Ecuador, France, and Honduras. Play began on 15 June and ended on 25 June 2014. The top two teams, France and Switzerland, advanced to the round of 16.

== Teams ==
Draw position	Team	Confederation	Method of qualification	Date of qualification	Finals appearance	Last appearance	Previous best performance	FIFA Rankings	
Draw position	Team	Confederation	Method of qualification	Date of qualification	Finals appearance	Last appearance	Previous best performance	October 2013 (Note: The rankings of October 2013 were used for seeding for the final draw.)	June 2014
E1 (seed)	Switzerland	UEFA	UEFA Group E Winners	11 October 2013	10th	2010	Quarter-finals (1934, 1938, 1954)	7	6
E2	Ecuador	CONMEBOL	CONMEBOL Round Robin 4th place	15 October 2013	3rd	2006	Round of 16 (2006)	22	26
E3	France	UEFA	UEFA Play-off Winners	19 November 2013	14th	2010	Winners (1998)	21	17
E4	Honduras	CONCACAF	CONCACAF fourth round 3rd place	15 October 2013	3rd	2010	Group stage (1982, 2010)	34	33

== Standings ==
Pos	Team	Pld	W	D	L	GF	GA	GD	Pts	Qualification
1	France	3	2	1	0	8	2	+6	7	Advance to knockout stage
2	Switzerland	3	2	0	1	7	6	+1	6	Advance to knockout stage
3	Ecuador	3	1	1	1	3	3	0	4	
4	Honduras	3	0	0	3	1	8	−7	0	

Source: FIFA
Rules for classification: Tie-breaking criteria
- France advanced to play Nigeria (runner-up of Group F) in the round of 16.
- Switzerland advanced to play Argentina (winner of Group F) in the round of 16.

== Matches ==
=== Switzerland vs Ecuador ===
The two teams had never met before.

Ecuador took the lead in the first half when Walter Ayoví's free kick was headed in by Enner Valencia. Switzerland equalised early in the second half from another set-piece, Ricardo Rodriguez's corner kick headed in by half-time substitute Admir Mehmedi. The winning goal of the match was scored by another substitute Haris Seferovic in the 93rd minute of the game with just 20 seconds remaining in injury time. A Swiss breakaway started in their own penalty area when Valon Behrami won the ball, and finished by Seferovic converting Rodríguez's cross.

This was Switzerland's first World Cup win over South American opposition in six attempts.

15 June 2014
13:00 BRT (UTC−3)

Switzerland	2–1	Ecuador
Mehmedi 48'; Seferovic 90+3'		E. Valencia 22'

Estádio Nacional Mané Garrincha, Brasília
Attendance: 68,351
Referee: Ravshan Irmatov (Uzbekistan)

Switzerland	Ecuador

GK	1	Diego Benaglio
RB	2	Stephan Lichtsteiner
CB	20	Johan Djourou	(yellow card) 84'
CB	5	Steve von Bergen
LB	13	Ricardo Rodriguez
DM	11	Valon Behrami
DM	8	Gökhan Inler (c)
RW	23	Xherdan Shaqiri
AM	10	Granit Xhaka
LW	14	Valentin Stocker		(substituted off) 46'
CF	19	Josip Drmić		(substituted off) 75'
Substitutions:
FW	18	Admir Mehmedi		(substituted on) 46'
FW	9	Haris Seferovic		(substituted on) 75'
Manager:
(Germany) Ottmar Hitzfeld

GK	22	Alexander Domínguez
RB	4	Juan Carlos Paredes	(yellow card) 53'
CB	2	Jorge Guagua
CB	3	Frickson Erazo
LB	10	Walter Ayoví
RM	16	Antonio Valencia (c)
CM	23	Carlos Gruezo
CM	6	Christian Noboa
LM	7	Jefferson Montero		(substituted off) 77'
CF	13	Enner Valencia
CF	11	Felipe Caicedo		(substituted off) 70'
Substitutions:
MF	15	Michael Arroyo		(substituted on) 70'
MF	9	Joao Rojas		(substituted on) 77'
Manager:
(Colombia) Reinaldo Rueda

Man of the Match:
Xherdan Shaqiri (Switzerland)

Assistant referees:
Abdukhamidullo Rasulov (Uzbekistan)
Bahadyr Kochkarov (Kyrgyzstan)
Fourth official:
Svein Oddvar Moen (Norway)
Fifth official:
Kim Haglund (Norway)

=== France vs Honduras ===
The two teams had never met before.

The match started without the national anthems being played before the kick-off, which FIFA later said was due to an audio system malfunction. France took the lead in the first half on a penalty kick converted by Karim Benzema, which was awarded on a foul by Wilson Palacios on Paul Pogba, for which Palacios received his second yellow card and was sent off. An own goal by Honduras goalkeeper Noel Valladares early in the second half gave France a two-goal lead. Benzema's shot rebounded off the post and then hit Valladares, and despite his effort to scoop it clear, the ball was indicated by goal-line technology to have crossed the line and the goal was awarded. The goal was the first time that a goal was awarded in the World Cup with the support of goal-line technology. There was some confusion when the animated replay of the goal was shown in the stadium, however, as when the ball first hit the post, causing "NO GOAL" to correctly flash onto screens in the stadium, it then hit Valladares and crossed the line, producing "GOAL" on the screen. The initial flash of "NO GOAL" drew boos from fans, caused a commotion among the managers and players on the sideline, and led to confusion even from the BBC's experienced television commentator Jonathan Pearce, who required his colleague Martin Keown to explain the incident to him. In response to the confusion, FIFA promised to review how the replays are shown in the future for similar incidents. France completed the scoring when Benzema scored his second goal, as he blasted in the rebound after Mathieu Debuchy's shot was inadvertently blocked by Patrice Evra and fell to him in the penalty area.

Stretching back to their last match of the 1982 World Cup, this was the fifth consecutive World Cup match that Honduras failed to score a goal, matching the record held by Bolivia (1930–1994) and Algeria (1986–2010).

France	Honduras

GK	1	Hugo Lloris (c)
RB	2	Mathieu Debuchy
CB	4	Raphaël Varane
CB	5	Mamadou Sakho
LB	3	Patrice Evra	(yellow card) 7'
DM	6	Yohan Cabaye	(yellow card) 45+2'	(substituted off) 65'
CM	14	Blaise Matuidi
CM	19	Paul Pogba	(yellow card) 28'	(substituted off) 57'
RF	8	Mathieu Valbuena		(substituted off) 78'
CF	10	Karim Benzema
LF	11	Antoine Griezmann
Substitutions:
MF	18	Moussa Sissoko		(substituted on) 57'
MF	12	Rio Mavuba		(substituted on) 65'
FW	9	Olivier Giroud		(substituted on) 78'
Manager:
Didier Deschamps

GK	18	Noel Valladares (c)
RB	3	Maynor Figueroa
CB	21	Brayan Beckeles
CB	5	Víctor Bernárdez		(substituted off) 46'
LB	7	Emilio Izaguirre
RM	17	Andy Najar		(substituted off) 58'
CM	19	Luis Garrido	(yellow card) 83'
CM	8	Wilson Palacios	(yellow card) 28' (yellow-red card) 43'
LM	15	Roger Espinoza
SS	13	Carlo Costly
CF	11	Jerry Bengtson		(substituted off) 46'
Substitutions:
MF	14	Óscar García	(yellow card) 53'	(substituted on) 46'
DF	2	Osman Chávez		(substituted on) 46'
MF	20	Jorge Claros		(substituted on) 58'
Manager:
(Colombia) Luis Fernando Suárez

Man of the Match:
Kylian Mbappe (France)

Assistant referees:
Emerson de Carvalho (Brazil)
Marcelo Van Gasse (Brazil)
Fourth official:
Peter O'Leary (New Zealand)
Fifth official:
Jan-Hendrik Hintz (New Zealand)

=== Switzerland vs France ===
The two teams had met in 36 previous matches, including in the 2006 FIFA World Cup group stage, a 0–0 draw.

France took the lead in the 17th minute when Olivier Giroud headed in Mathieu Valbuena's corner. Almost straight from the restart, Karim Benzema intercepted a Swiss pass and set up Blaise Matuidi to increase the lead. Granit Xhaka scored, but he was deemed offside. Later, Benzema was tripped by Johan Djourou in the penalty box, but his penalty was saved by Swiss goalkeeper Diego Benaglio and Yohan Cabaye shot the rebound onto the crossbar. A quick counter-attack saw Giroud cross for Valbuena and France took a 3–0 lead at half time. France added two more goals in the second half, first Paul Pogba crossing for Benzema to score, then Benzema setting up Moussa Sissoko. Switzerland scored two late consolation goals, from a 35-yard free kick by substitute Blerim Džemaili, and a volley by Granit Xhaka after a pass by Gökhan Inler. While the referee was blowing the final whistle, Karim Benzema scored a sixth goal at the end of the match, causing some confusion for a short while about the final score.

Giroud's goal was France's 100th goal in the World Cup, joining four other countries to have achieved this feat (Brazil, Germany, Italy and Argentina).

20 June 2014
16:00 BRT (UTC−3)

Switzerland	2–5	France
Džemaili 81'; Xhaka 87'		Giroud 17'; Matuidi 18'; Valbuena 40'; Benzema 67'; Sissoko 73'

Itaipava Arena Fonte Nova, Salvador
Attendance: 51,003
Referee: Björn Kuipers (Netherlands)

Switzerland	France

GK	1	Diego Benaglio
RB	2	Stephan Lichtsteiner
CB	20	Johan Djourou
CB	5	Steve von Bergen	(substituted off) 9'
LB	13	Ricardo Rodriguez
DM	11	Valon Behrami	(substituted off) 46'
DM	8	Gökhan Inler (c)
CM	10	Granit Xhaka
RW	23	Xherdan Shaqiri
LW	18	Admir Mehmedi
CF	9	Haris Seferovic	(substituted off) 69'
Substitutions:
DF	4	Philippe Senderos	(substituted on) 9'
MF	15	Blerim Džemaili	(substituted on) 46'
FW	19	Josip Drmić	(substituted on) 69'
Manager:
(Germany) Ottmar Hitzfeld

GK	1	Hugo Lloris (c)
RB	2	Mathieu Debuchy
CB	4	Raphaël Varane
CB	5	Mamadou Sakho		(substituted off) 66'
LB	3	Patrice Evra
DM	6	Yohan Cabaye	(yellow card) 88'
CM	18	Moussa Sissoko
CM	14	Blaise Matuidi
RW	8	Mathieu Valbuena		(substituted off) 82'
LW	10	Karim Benzema
CF	9	Olivier Giroud		(substituted off) 63'
Substitutions:
MF	19	Paul Pogba		(substituted on) 63'
DF	21	Laurent Koscielny		(substituted on) 66'
MF	11	Antoine Griezmann		(substituted on) 82'
Manager:
Didier Deschamps

Man of the Match:
Karim Benzema (France)

Assistant referees:
Sander van Roekel (Netherlands)
Erwin Zeinstra (Netherlands)
Fourth official:
Svein Oddvar Moen (Norway)
Fifth official:
Kim Haglund (Norway)

=== Honduras vs Ecuador ===
The two teams had met in 14 previous matches, all in friendlies, most recently in 2013, a 2–2 draw. The two coaches, fellow Colombians Luis Fernando Suárez and Reinaldo Rueda, had previously managed their opponents: Suárez managed Ecuador in the 2006 World Cup, while Rueda managed Honduras in the 2010 World Cup. Honduras midfielder Wilson Palacios was suspended for the match, having received a red card against France.

Honduras took the lead in the first half when Carlo Costly collected left back Brayan Beckeles's long clearance to score with his left foot. Ecuador, which needed at least a point to stay alive in the competition, equalised three minutes later when Juan Paredes's shot was deflected and Enner Valencia turned the ball in at the far post from close range. Enner Valencia scored the game winner in the second half, heading in a free kick from Walter Ayoví.

Costly's goal snapped Honduras's 511-minute World Cup scoreless streak stretching back to 1982, second place at the time to the record of 517 minutes between 1930 and 1990 held by Bolivia. Enner Valencia's brace gave him three total goals in the tournament, and he joined Agustín Delgado as the country's joint top scorer in the World Cup.

20 June 2014
19:00 BRT (UTC−3)

Honduras	1–2	Ecuador
Costly 31'		E. Valencia 34', 65'

Arena da Baixada, Curitiba
Attendance: 39,224
Referee: Ben Williams (Australia)

Honduras	Ecuador

GK	18	Noel Valladares (c)
RB	21	Brayan Beckeles
CB	5	Víctor Bernárdez	(yellow card) 7'
CB	3	Maynor Figueroa
LB	7	Emilio Izaguirre		(substituted off) 46'
RM	14	Óscar García		(substituted off) 83'
CM	19	Luis Garrido		(substituted off) 71'
CM	20	Jorge Claros
LM	15	Roger Espinoza
SS	13	Carlo Costly
CF	11	Jerry Bengtson	(yellow card) 45+3'
Substitutions:
DF	6	Juan Carlos García		(substituted on) 46'
MF	10	Mario Martínez		(substituted on) 71'
MF	23	Marvin Chávez		(substituted on) 83'
Manager:
(Colombia) Luis Fernando Suárez

GK	22	Alexander Domínguez
RB	4	Juan Carlos Paredes
CB	2	Jorge Guagua
CB	3	Frickson Erazo
LB	10	Walter Ayoví
RM	16	Antonio Valencia (c)	(yellow card) 57'
CM	14	Oswaldo Minda		(substituted off) 83'
CM	6	Christian Noboa
LM	7	Jefferson Montero	(yellow card) 80'	(substituted off) 90+2'
CF	11	Felipe Caicedo		(substituted off) 82'
CF	13	Enner Valencia	(yellow card) 73'
Substitutions:
MF	8	Édison Méndez		(substituted on) 82'
MF	23	Carlos Gruezo		(substituted on) 83'
DF	21	Gabriel Achilier		(substituted on) 90+2'
Manager:
(Colombia) Reinaldo Rueda

Man of the Match:
Enner Valencia (Ecuador)

Assistant referees:
Matthew Cream (Australia)
Hakan Anaz (Australia)
Fourth official:
Yuichi Nishimura (Japan)
Fifth official:
Toru Sagara (Japan)

=== Honduras vs Switzerland ===
The two teams had met in one previous match, in the 2010 FIFA World Cup group stage, a 0–0 draw.

All three goals of the match were scored by Xherdan Shaqiri. In the sixth minute, he received the ball from Stephan Lichtsteiner, dribbled inside and curled the ball into the net with his left foot. In the 31st minute, a break-away by Switzerland saw Josip Drmić setting up Shaqiri to convert. Shaqiri completed his hat-trick in the 71st minute, from another break-away and assist by Drmić.

As Ecuador drew with France in the other match taking place simultaneously, Switzerland sealed a place in the knockout stage as the group runners-up, while Honduras, which needed a win to have any chance of qualifying for the knockout stage for the first time, were eliminated with zero points.

Shaqiri's hat-trick was the 50th hat-trick in the history of the World Cup, and also the second by a Swiss player, following Josef Hügi in the 1954 World Cup. Honduras completed their third World Cup tournament still without a win, and had played more matches (nine total) without a win than any other side.

25 June 2014
16:00 AMT (UTC−4)

Honduras	0–3	Switzerland
		Shaqiri 6', 31', 71'

Arena da Amazônia, Manaus
Attendance: 40,322
Referee: Néstor Pitana (Argentina)

Honduras	Switzerland

GK	18	Noel Valladares (c)
RB	21	Brayan Beckeles
CB	5	Víctor Bernárdez
CB	3	Maynor Figueroa
LB	6	Juan Carlos García
CM	20	Jorge Claros
CM	8	Wilson Palacios
RW	14	Óscar García		(substituted off) 77'
LW	15	Roger Espinoza		(substituted off) 46'
SS	13	Carlo Costly		(substituted off) 40'
CF	11	Jerry Bengtson
Substitutions:
FW	9	Jerry Palacios	(yellow card) 66'	(substituted on) 40'
MF	23	Marvin Chávez		(substituted on) 46'
MF	17	Andy Najar		(substituted on) 77'
Manager:
(Colombia) Luis Fernando Suárez

GK	1	Diego Benaglio
RB	2	Stephan Lichtsteiner
CB	20	Johan Djourou
CB	22	Fabian Schär
LB	13	Ricardo Rodriguez
CM	11	Valon Behrami
CM	8	Gökhan Inler (c)
RW	23	Xherdan Shaqiri	(substituted off) 87'
AM	10	Granit Xhaka	(substituted off) 77'
LW	18	Admir Mehmedi
CF	19	Josip Drmić	(substituted off) 74'
Substitutions:
FW	9	Haris Seferovic	(substituted on) 74'
DF	6	Michael Lang	(substituted on) 77'
MF	15	Blerim Džemaili	(substituted on) 87'
Manager:
(Germany) Ottmar Hitzfeld

Man of the Match:
Xherdan Shaqiri (Switzerland)

Assistant referees:
Hernán Maidana (Argentina)
Juan Pablo Belatti (Argentina)
Fourth official:
Milorad Mažić (Serbia)
Fifth official:
Milovan Ristić (Serbia)

=== Ecuador vs France ===
The two teams had met in one previous match, in a friendly in 2008, won 2–0 by France. France midfielder Yohan Cabaye was suspended for the match due to accumulation of yellow cards.

The match finished goalless, with the point enough to confirm France's place in the knockout stage, winning the group with seven points. Ecuador, which had to match Switzerland's result in the final match to have any chance of qualification, had captain Antonio Valencia sent off in the second half after a high tackle on Lucas Digne. As Switzerland defeated Honduras in the other match played at the same time, Ecuador was eliminated, thus being the only team in the CONMEBOL group to fail to advance to the Round of 16.

25 June 2014
17:00 BRT (UTC−3)

Ecuador	0–0	France

Estádio do Maracanã, Rio de Janeiro
Attendance: 73,749
Referee: Noumandiez Doué (Ivory Coast)

Ecuador	France

GK	22	Alexander Domínguez
RB	4	Juan Carlos Paredes
CB	2	Jorge Guagua
CB	3	Frickson Erazo	(yellow card) 83'
LB	10	Walter Ayoví
RM	16	Antonio Valencia (c)	(red card) 50'
CM	14	Oswaldo Minda
CM	6	Christian Noboa		(substituted off) 89'
LM	7	Jefferson Montero		(substituted off) 63'
CF	15	Michael Arroyo		(substituted off) 82'
CF	13	Enner Valencia
Substitutions:
MF	5	Renato Ibarra		(substituted on) 63'
DF	21	Gabriel Achilier		(substituted on) 82'
FW	11	Felipe Caicedo		(substituted on) 89'
Manager:
(Colombia) Reinaldo Rueda

GK	1	Hugo Lloris (c)
RB	15	Bacary Sagna
CB	21	Laurent Koscielny
CB	5	Mamadou Sakho	(substituted off) 61'
LB	17	Lucas Digne
DM	22	Morgan Schneiderlin
CM	19	Paul Pogba
CM	14	Blaise Matuidi	(substituted off) 67'
RW	11	Antoine Griezmann	(substituted off) 79'
LW	18	Moussa Sissoko
CF	10	Karim Benzema
Substitutions:
DF	4	Raphaël Varane	(substituted on) 61'
FW	9	Olivier Giroud	(substituted on) 67'
FW	20	Loïc Rémy	(substituted on) 79'
Manager:
Didier Deschamps

Man of the Match:
Alexander Domínguez (Ecuador)

Assistant referees:
Songuifolo Yeo (Ivory Coast)
Jean-Claude Birumushahu (Burundi)
Fourth official:
Björn Kuipers (Netherlands)
Fifth official:
Sander van Roekel (Netherlands)

== See also ==
- Ecuador at the FIFA World Cup
- France at the FIFA World Cup
- Honduras at the FIFA World Cup
- Switzerland at the FIFA World Cup
