= 2018 FIFA World Cup officials =

The following is a list of match officials (referees, assistant referees, and video assistant referees) who officiated at the 2018 FIFA World Cup.

== Referees and assistant referees ==
On 29 March 2018, FIFA published the list of 36 referees and 63 assistant referees, on the basis of nationality, from all six football confederations for the 2018 FIFA World Cup. These were selected from a longlist of 53 trios.

Out of these, one referee and one assistant referee were dropped from the list and were not replaced. The two assistant referees associated with the dropped referee also withdrew, but were replaced in the roster.

On 12 July 2018, FIFA announced that Argentine referee Néstor Pitana would take charge of the final.

Confederation	Referee	Assistant referees	Matches assigned	Fourth official
AFC	Abdulrahman Al-Jassim (Qatar)			Poland–Senegal (Group H); Japan–Senegal (Group H)
AFC	Alireza Faghani (Iran)	Reza Sokhandan (Iran); Mohammadreza Mansouri (Iran)	Serbia–Brazil (Group E); Germany–Mexico (Group F); France–Argentina (Round of 16); Belgium–England (Match for third place)	Uruguay–France (Quarter-finals)
AFC	Ravshan Irmatov (Uzbekistan)	Abdukhamidullo Rasulov (Uzbekistan); Jakhongir Saidov (Uzbekistan)	Spain–Morocco (Group B); Argentina–Croatia (Group D)	
AFC	Mohammed Abdulla Hassan Mohamed (United Arab Emirates)	Mohamed Al Hammadi (United Arab Emirates); Hasan Al Mahri (United Arab Emirates)	France–Peru (Group C)	Spain–Morocco (Group B); Germany–Mexico (Group F); England–Belgium (Group G)
AFC	Ryuji Sato (Japan)	Toru Sagara (Japan); Hiroshi Yamauchi (Japan)		Portugal–Spain (Group B); Australia–Peru (Group C); Germany–Sweden (Group F); Belgium–Panama (Group G)
AFC	Nawaf Shukralla (Bahrain)	Yaser Tulefat (Bahrain); Taleb Al Maari (Qatar)	Panama–Tunisia (Group G); Poland–Senegal (Group H)	Serbia–Switzerland (Group E); Sweden–Switzerland (Round of 16)
CAF	Mehdi Abid Charef (Algeria)	Anouar Hmila (Tunisia)		Iran–Portugal (Group B); Peru–Denmark (Group C); Panama–Tunisia (Group G); Colombia–Japan (Group H)
CAF	Malang Diedhiou (Senegal)	Djibril Camara (Senegal); El Hadji Samba (Senegal)	Uruguay–Russia (Group A); Costa Rica–Serbia (Group E); Belgium–Japan (Round of 16)	Belgium–England (Match for third place)
CAF	Bakary Gassama (Gambia)	Jean Claude Birumushahu (Burundi); Abdelhak Etchiali (Algeria)	Peru–Denmark (Group C)	Belgium–Japan (Round of 16)
CAF	Gehad Grisha (Egypt)	Redouane Achik (Morocco); Waleed Ahmed (Sudan)	England–Panama (Group G)	
CAF	Janny Sikazwe (Zambia)	Jerson Dos Santos (Angola); Zakhele Siwela (South Africa)	Belgium–Panama (Group G); Japan–Poland (Group H)	France–Peru (Group C); Russia–Croatia (Quarter-finals)
CAF	Bamlak Tessema Weyesa (Ethiopia)			Uruguay–Russia (Group A); Denmark–Australia (Group C); Costa Rica–Serbia (Group E); Senegal–Colombia (Group H)
CONCACAF	Joel Aguilar (El Salvador)	Juan Zumba (El Salvador); Juan Carlos Mora (Costa Rica)	Sweden–South Korea (Group F)	
CONCACAF	Mark Geiger (United States)	Joe Fletcher (Canada); Frank Anderson (United States)	Portugal–Morocco (Group B); South Korea–Germany (Group F); Colombia–England (Round of 16)	
CONCACAF	Jair Marrufo (United States)	Corey Rockwell (United States); Juan Zumba (El Salvador)	Belgium–Tunisia (Group G)	Serbia–Brazil (Group E); Uruguay–Portugal (Round of 16); Brazil–Belgium (Quarter-finals)
CONCACAF	César Arturo Ramos (Mexico)	Marvin Torrentera (Mexico); Miguel Hernández (Mexico)	Brazil–Switzerland (Group E); Poland–Colombia (Group H); Uruguay–Portugal (Round of 16)	France–Belgium (Semi-finals)
CONCACAF	Ricardo Montero (Costa Rica)			Nigeria–Iceland (Group D); Saudi Arabia–Egypt (Group A); Tunisia–England (Group G); Japan–Poland (Group H)
CONCACAF	John Pitti (Panama)	Gabriel Victoria (Panama)		Uruguay–Saudi Arabia (Group A); Iceland–Croatia (Group D); Brazil–Switzerland (Group E); South Korea–Mexico (Group F)
CONMEBOL	Julio Bascuñán (Chile)	Carlos Astroza (Chile); Christian Schiemann (Chile)		Iran–Spain (Group B); France–Australia (Group C); South Korea–Germany (Group F); Poland–Colombia (Group H); France–Argentina (Round of 16)
CONMEBOL	Enrique Cáceres (Paraguay)	Eduardo Cardozo (Paraguay); Juan Zorrilla (Paraguay)	Russia–Egypt (Group A); Iran–Portugal (Group B)	Croatia–Denmark (Round of 16)
CONMEBOL	Andrés Cunha (Uruguay)	Nicolás Taran (Uruguay); Mauricio Espinosa (Uruguay)	Iran–Spain (Group B); France–Australia (Group C); France–Belgium (Semi-finals)	Mexico–Sweden (Group F); Belgium–Tunisia (Group G)
CONMEBOL	Néstor Pitana (Argentina)	Hernán Maidana (Argentina); Juan Pablo Belatti (Argentina)	Russia–Saudi Arabia (Group A); Mexico–Sweden (Group F); Croatia–Denmark (Round of 16); Uruguay–France (Quarter-finals); France–Croatia (Final)	
CONMEBOL	Sandro Ricci (Brazil)	Emerson de Carvalho (Brazil); Marcelo Van Gasse (Brazil)	Denmark–France (Group C); Croatia–Nigeria (Group D); Russia–Croatia (Quarter-finals)	Russia–Saudi Arabia (Group A)
CONMEBOL	Wilmar Roldán (Colombia)	Alexander Guzmán (Colombia); Cristian de la Cruz (Colombia)	Saudi Arabia–Egypt (Group A); Tunisia–England (Group G)	Argentina–Iceland (Group D)
OFC	Matthew Conger (New Zealand)	Simon Lount (New Zealand); Tevita Makasini (Tonga)	Nigeria–Iceland (Group D)	Colombia–England (Round of 16)
OFC	Norbert Hauata (Tahiti)	Bertrand Brial (New Caledonia)		Argentina–Croatia (Group D); Switzerland–Costa Rica (Group E); Sweden–South Korea (Group F); England–Panama (Group G)
UEFA	Felix Brych (Germany)	Mark Borsch (Germany); Stefan Lupp (Germany)	Serbia–Switzerland (Group E)	
UEFA	Cüneyt Çakır (Turkey)	Bahattin Duran (Turkey); Tarık Ongun (Turkey)	Morocco–Iran (Group B); Nigeria–Argentina (Group D); Croatia–England (Semi-finals)	Russia–Egypt (Group A)
UEFA	Sergei Karasev (Russia)	Anton Averianov (Russia); Tikhon Kalugin (Russia)	Australia–Peru (Group C)	Morocco–Iran (Group B); Portugal–Morocco (Group B)
UEFA	Björn Kuipers (Netherlands)	Sander van Roekel (Netherlands); Erwin Zeinstra (Netherlands)	Egypt–Uruguay (Group A); Brazil–Costa Rica (Group E); Spain–Russia (Round of 16); Sweden–England (Quarter-finals)	Nigeria–Argentina (Group D); Croatia–England (Semi-finals)
UEFA	Szymon Marciniak (Poland)	Paweł Sokolnicki (Poland); Tomasz Listkiewicz (Poland)	Argentina–Iceland (Group D); Germany–Sweden (Group F)	
UEFA	Antonio Mateu Lahoz (Spain)	Pau Cebrián Devís (Spain); Roberto Díaz Pérez (Spain)	Denmark–Australia (Group C); Iceland–Croatia (Group D)	Croatia–Nigeria (Group D); Brazil–Mexico (Round of 16); Sweden–England (Quarter-finals)
UEFA	Milorad Mažić (Serbia)	Milovan Ristić (Serbia); Dalibor Đurđević (Serbia)	South Korea–Mexico (Group F); Senegal–Colombia (Group H); Brazil–Belgium (Quarter-finals)	Egypt–Uruguay (Group A)
UEFA	Gianluca Rocchi (Italy)	Elenito Di Liberatore (Italy); Mauro Tonolini (Italy)	Portugal–Spain (Group B); Japan–Senegal (Group H); Brazil–Mexico (Round of 16)	Denmark–France (Group C)
UEFA	Damir Skomina (Slovenia)	Jure Praprotnik (Slovenia); Robert Vukan (Slovenia)	England–Belgium (Group G); Colombia–Japan (Group H); Sweden–Switzerland (Round of 16)	Brazil–Costa Rica (Group E)
UEFA	Clément Turpin (France)	Cyril Gringore (France); Nicolas Danos (France)	Uruguay–Saudi Arabia (Group A); Switzerland–Costa Rica (Group E)	Spain–Russia (Round of 16)

== Video assistant referees ==
On 30 April 2018, FIFA announced 13 video assistant referees (VARs) had been appointed. For each World Cup game, there will be one VAR and three AVARs (Assistant Video Assistant Referees), each responsible for different situations. They will be supporting the main referee from the Video Operation Room based at the International Broadcast Centre (IBC) in Moscow.

Confederation	VAR
AFC	Abdulrahman Al-Jassim (Qatar)
CONMEBOL	Wilton Sampaio (Brazil)
CONMEBOL	Gery Vargas (Bolivia)
CONMEBOL	Mauro Vigliano (Argentina)
UEFA	Bastian Dankert (Germany)
UEFA	Artur Soares Dias (Portugal)
UEFA	Paweł Gil (Poland)
UEFA	Massimiliano Irrati (Italy)
UEFA	Tiago Martins (Portugal)
UEFA	Danny Makkelie (Netherlands)
UEFA	Daniele Orsato (Italy)
UEFA	Paolo Valeri (Italy)
UEFA	Felix Zwayer (Germany)

== Referees withdrawn and replaced ==
Referee Fahad Al-Mirdasi (Saudi Arabia) was withdrawn due to attempted match-fixing at the 2018 King Cup Final. His assistant referees were also withdrawn:

- Mohammed Al-Abakry (Saudi Arabia)
- Abdullah Al-Shalwai (Saudi Arabia)

No referee was called up to replace Al-Mirdasi, but two assistant referees were called up to complete the referee teams of Mohammed Abdulla Hassan Mohamed (United Arab Emirates) and Ryuji Sato (Japan), respectively:

- Hasan Al Mahri (United Arab Emirates)
- Hiroshi Yamauchi (Japan)

Assistant referee Marwa Range (Kenya) also withdrew after the BBC released an investigation conducted by a Ghanaian journalist which implicated Marwa in a bribery scandal.
