= 2018 FIFA World Cup Group C =

Football tournament

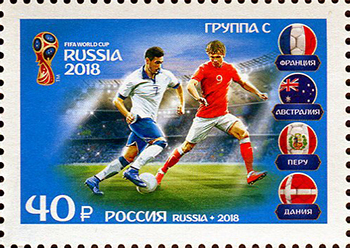
2018 postage stamp from Russia depicting Group C of the 2018 FIFA World Cup group stage

Group C of the 2018 FIFA World Cup took place from 16 to 26 June 2018. The group consisted of eventual champions France, Australia, Peru, and Denmark. The top two teams, France and Denmark, advanced to the round of 16.

France, Denmark, and the winners of the play-off between Australia and Peru (ultimately Australia) were drawn into the same group again for the 2022 FIFA World Cup.

== Teams ==
Draw position	Team	Pot	Confederation	Method of qualification	Date of qualification	Finals appearance	Last appearance	Previous best performance	FIFA Rankings	
Draw position	Team	Pot	Confederation	Method of qualification	Date of qualification	Finals appearance	Last appearance	Previous best performance	October 2017 (Note: The rankings of October 2017 were used for seeding for the final draw.)	June 2018
C1	France	1	UEFA	UEFA Group A winners	10 October 2017	15th	2014 (quarter-finals)	Winners (1998)	7	7
C2	Australia	4	AFC	CONCACAF v AFC play-off winners	15 November 2017	5th	2014 (group stage)	Round of 16 (2006)	43	36
C3	Peru	2	CONMEBOL	OFC v CONMEBOL play-off winners	15 November 2017	5th	1982 (first group stage)	Quarter-finals (1970), Second round (1978)	10	11
C4	Denmark	3	UEFA	UEFA second round winners	14 November 2017	5th	2010 (group stage)	Quarter-finals (1998)	19	12

== Standings ==
Pos	Team	Pld	W	D	L	GF	GA	GD	Pts	Qualification
1	France	3	2	1	0	3	1	+2	7	Advance to knockout stage
2	Denmark	3	1	2	0	2	1	+1	5	Advance to knockout stage
3	Peru	3	1	0	2	2	2	0	3	
4	Australia	3	0	1	2	2	5	−3	1	

Source: FIFA
Rules for classification: Group stage tiebreakers

In the round of 16:

- The winners of Group C, France, advanced to play the runners-up of Group D, Argentina.
- The runners-up of Group C, Denmark, advanced to play the winners of Group D, Croatia.

== Matches ==
All times listed are local time.

=== France vs Australia ===
The two teams had met in four previous matches, most recently in a 2013 friendly, a 6–0 France victory.

After a disjointed first half, the game sparked into life shortly after the interval as referee Andrés Cunha initially disallowed a French penalty, but after a call from the VAR, changed his decision and awarded the penalty to France, deciding that Josh Risdon had clipped Antoine Griezmann just inside the area. Griezmann would convert the penalty, which was the first World Cup penalty awarded by VAR. The opener was soon cancelled out just four minutes later by another penalty, Australian midfielder and captain, Mile Jedinak, slotting home after Samuel Umtiti handled the ball in the box, and they looked on course to hold one of the pre-tournament favourites until Paul Pogba's lobbed effort confirmed by goal line technology deflected off Australia full-back Aziz Behich and the crossbar to fall inches over the goal-line.

The two penalties were scored in the game between France and Australia were only four minutes, seven seconds apart - the shortest period of time between two penalties being scored by different sides in a World Cup match. Both countries also featured their youngest ever World Cup players in Daniel Arzani at 19 years and 163 days and Kylian Mbappé at 19 years and 178 days.

16 June 2018
13:00 MSK (UTC+3)

France	2–1	Australia
Griezmann 58' (pen.); Behich 81' (o.g.)		Jedinak 62' (pen.)

Kazan Arena, Kazan
Attendance: 41,279
Referee: Andrés Cunha (Uruguay)

France	Australia

GK	1	Hugo Lloris (c)
RB	2	Benjamin Pavard
CB	4	Raphaël Varane
CB	5	Samuel Umtiti
LB	21	Lucas Hernandez
CM	12	Corentin Tolisso	(yellow card) 76'	(substituted off) 78'
CM	13	N'Golo Kanté
CM	6	Paul Pogba
RF	11	Ousmane Dembélé		(substituted off) 70'
CF	10	Kylian Mbappé
LF	7	Antoine Griezmann		(substituted off) 70'
Substitutions:
FW	9	Olivier Giroud		(substituted on) 70'
FW	18	Nabil Fekir		(substituted on) 70'
MF	14	Blaise Matuidi		(substituted on) 78'
Manager:
Didier Deschamps

GK	1	Mathew Ryan
RB	19	Josh Risdon	(yellow card) 57'
CB	5	Mark Milligan
CB	20	Trent Sainsbury
LB	16	Aziz Behich	(yellow card) 87'
CM	15	Mile Jedinak (c)
CM	13	Aaron Mooy
RW	7	Mathew Leckie	(yellow card) 13'
AM	23	Tom Rogic		(substituted off) 72'
LW	10	Robbie Kruse		(substituted off) 84'
CF	11	Andrew Nabbout		(substituted off) 64'
Substitutions:
FW	9	Tomi Juric		(substituted on) 64'
MF	22	Jackson Irvine		(substituted on) 72'
FW	17	Daniel Arzani		(substituted on) 84'
Manager:
(Netherlands) Bert van Marwijk

Man of the Match:
Antoine Griezmann (France)

Assistant referees:
Nicolás Taran (Uruguay)
Mauricio Espinosa (Uruguay)
Fourth official:
Julio Bascuñán (Chile)
Reserve assistant referee:
Christian Schiemann (Chile)
Video assistant referee:
Mauro Vigliano (Argentina)
Assistant video assistant referees:
Tiago Martins (Portugal)
Hernán Maidana (Argentina)
Jair Marrufo (United States)

=== Peru vs Denmark ===
The two teams had never met before in a FIFA-sanctioned match, but both teams previously faced each other in an exhibition match at the 1997 U.S. Cup (a 2–1 Denmark victory).

Yoshimar Yotún lashed the ball into Kasper Schmeichel's midriff from 25 yards as Peru began the game and Edison Flores lifted a shot over the crossbar from just outside the box. André Carrillo surged towards the Denmark box in the 13th minute and cut inside to curl a low drive towards the bottom-left corner, only for Schmeichel to pull off a diving save. Denmark began to dominate possession but it was not until the 27th minute that they attempted a shot on goal, Thomas Delaney launching the ball over. Denmark midfielder William Kvist was taken off on a stretcher after a sustaining a blow to the ribs in a challenge with Jefferson Farfán, and then Christian Cueva was brought down in the penalty area by Yussuf Poulsen. The referee pointed to the spot upon reviewing video footage and Cueva blazed over, much to the dismay of Peru's sizable travelling support. Adopting a more adventurous approach after the restart, Denmark were rewarded when Christian Eriksen's precise through-ball allowed Poulsen to open the scoring with a low left foot shot. Peru were denied an immediate equaliser when Denmark goalkeeper Schmeichel produced a one-handed save to deny Flores. Substitute Paolo Guerrero, who was only able to play after a Swiss tribunal lifted a 14-month drugs ban, backheeled a chance wide as Denmark held on.

Denmark have won three of their four World Cup matches against South American opponents, with the only exception being a 3–2 defeat against Brazil in the 1998 quarter-final.

16 June 2018
19:00 MSK (UTC+3)

Peru	0–1	Denmark
		Poulsen 59'

Mordovia Arena, Saransk
Attendance: 40,502
Referee: Bakary Gassama (Gambia)

Peru	Denmark

GK	1	Pedro Gallese
RB	17	Luis Advíncula
CB	2	Alberto Rodríguez (c)
CB	15	Christian Ramos
LB	6	Miguel Trauco
CM	13	Renato Tapia	(yellow card) 38'	(substituted off) 87'
CM	19	Yoshimar Yotún
RW	18	André Carrillo
AM	8	Christian Cueva
LW	20	Edison Flores		(substituted off) 62'
CF	10	Jefferson Farfán		(substituted off) 85'
Substitutions:
FW	9	Paolo Guerrero		(substituted on) 62'
FW	11	Raúl Ruidíaz		(substituted on) 85'
MF	23	Pedro Aquino		(substituted on) 87'
Manager:
(Argentina) Ricardo Gareca

GK	1	Kasper Schmeichel
RB	14	Henrik Dalsgaard
CB	4	Simon Kjær (c)
CB	6	Andreas Christensen		(substituted off) 81'
LB	17	Jens Stryger Larsen
CM	7	William Kvist		(substituted off) 35'
CM	10	Christian Eriksen
CM	8	Thomas Delaney	(yellow card) 86'
RF	20	Yussuf Poulsen	(yellow card) 90+3'
CF	9	Nicolai Jørgensen
LF	23	Pione Sisto		(substituted off) 67'
Substitutions:
MF	19	Lasse Schöne		(substituted on) 35'
FW	11	Martin Braithwaite		(substituted on) 67'
DF	13	Mathias Jørgensen		(substituted on) 81'
Manager:
(Norway) Åge Hareide

Man of the Match:
Yussuf Poulsen (Denmark)

Assistant referees:
Jean Claude Birumushahu (Burundi)
Abdelhak Etchiali (Algeria)
Fourth official:
Mehdi Abid Charef (Algeria)
Reserve assistant referee:
Anouar Hmila (Tunisia)
Video assistant referee:
Felix Zwayer (Germany)
Assistant video assistant referees:
Bastian Dankert (Germany)
Mark Borsch (Germany)
Danny Makkelie (Netherlands)

=== Denmark vs Australia ===
The two teams had met in three previous matches, most recently in a friendly in 2012, with Denmark prevailing 2–0.

Thomas Delaney headed wide from Pione Sisto's cross after just two minutes against Australia. At the other end, Mathew Leckie rose above the Danish defence to head a corner over the bar but Denmark countered and Nicolai Jørgensen's lay-off afforded Christian Eriksen the chance to hit a half-volley past Mathew Ryan and into the top left corner of the net. Sisto shot a 20-yard drive and Jørgensen flashed a close-range header just wide. In the 35th minute, referee consulted VAR and decided that Yussuf Poulsen used his arm to block Leckie's headed shot and awarded the penalty, which Mile Jedinak shot into the bottom right corner of the net. Poulsen had a penalty claim of his own waved away early in the second half after he tumbled to the ground on his way into the Australia box. Kasper Schmeichel failed to collect a looping long ball before Leckie flashed the ball across the face of goal. Daniel Arzani teed up Aaron Mooy for a shot that flew just over the top right corner of Schmeichel's goal from outside the box. Andrew Nabbout left the field with a dislocated shoulder and was replaced by Tomi Juric.

After Ghana, Australia are the second team in World Cup history to score three consecutive goals from the penalty spot. Poulsen is the first player to concede two penalties in a single World Cup since Milan Dudić for Serbia in 2006. Mark Milligan completed 85 passes in this match - a record for an Australian player in a single game at a World Cup tournament. As Poulsen had a yellow card in the previous match, he did not play for Denmark in the next match.

21 June 2018
16:00 SAMT (UTC+4)

Denmark	1–1	Australia
Eriksen 7'		Jedinak 38' (pen.)

Cosmos Arena, Samara
Attendance: 40,727
Referee: Antonio Mateu Lahoz (Spain)

Denmark	Australia

GK	1	Kasper Schmeichel
RB	14	Henrik Dalsgaard
CB	4	Simon Kjær (c)
CB	6	Andreas Christensen
LB	17	Jens Stryger Larsen
CM	8	Thomas Delaney
CM	19	Lasse Schöne
CM	10	Christian Eriksen
RF	20	Yussuf Poulsen	(yellow card) 37'	(substituted off) 59'
CF	9	Nicolai Jørgensen		(substituted off) 68'
LF	23	Pione Sisto	(yellow card) 84'
Substitutions:
FW	11	Martin Braithwaite		(substituted on) 59'
FW	21	Andreas Cornelius		(substituted on) 68'
Manager:
(Norway) Åge Hareide

GK	1	Mathew Ryan
RB	19	Josh Risdon
CB	20	Trent Sainsbury
CB	5	Mark Milligan
LB	16	Aziz Behich
CM	15	Mile Jedinak (c)
CM	13	Aaron Mooy
RW	7	Mathew Leckie
AM	23	Tom Rogic	(substituted off) 82'
LW	10	Robbie Kruse	(substituted off) 68'
CF	11	Andrew Nabbout	(substituted off) 75'
Substitutions:
FW	17	Daniel Arzani	(substituted on) 68'
FW	9	Tomi Juric	(substituted on) 75'
MF	22	Jackson Irvine	(substituted on) 82'
Manager:
(Netherlands) Bert van Marwijk

Man of the Match:
Christian Eriksen (Denmark)

Assistant referees:
Pau Cebrián Devís (Spain)
Roberto Díaz Pérez (Spain)
Fourth official:
Bamlak Tessema Weyesa (Ethiopia)
Reserve assistant referee:
Juan Carlos Mora (Costa Rica)
Video assistant referee:
Mark Geiger (United States)
Assistant video assistant referees:
Jair Marrufo (United States)
Joe Fletcher (Canada)
Paolo Valeri (Italy)

=== France vs Peru ===
The two teams had met only once, a friendly game in 1982, won by Peru 1–0.

Yoshimar Yotún's shot from the halfway line drifted wide. Raphaël Varane missed with a header before Pedro Gallese saved with his legs to deny Antoine Griezmann after Olivier Giroud found him with a headed pass. Paolo Guerrero shot straight at Hugo Lloris on the turn after Christian Cueva found him in the box. Paul Pogba slid Giroud into the area and when his shot looped over Gallese via a deflection off Christian Ramos, Kylian Mbappé tapped into the empty net from inside the six-yard box. Pedro Aquino clipped the outside of the post with a drive from 25 yards. André Carrillo fired over the crossbar and Jefferson Farfán hit the side-netting. Guerrero missed a late free-kick, and France secured their place in the knockout stages, while Peru were knocked out.

Mbappé became France's youngest ever goalscorer at the World Cup, aged 19 years and 183 days, as well as the first player born after France's 1998 World Cup triumph to score a goal at the finals. Peru are just the second South American side to fail to qualify for the World Cup knockout stage in the last three tournaments - the other being Ecuador in 2014.

21 June 2018
20:00 YEKT (UTC+5)

France	1–0	Peru
Mbappé 34'

Central Stadium, Yekaterinburg
Attendance: 32,789
Referee: Mohammed Abdulla Hassan Mohamed (United Arab Emirates)

France	Peru

GK	1	Hugo Lloris (c)
RB	2	Benjamin Pavard
CB	4	Raphaël Varane
CB	5	Samuel Umtiti
LB	21	Lucas Hernandez
CM	6	Paul Pogba	(yellow card) 86'	(substituted off) 89'
CM	13	N'Golo Kanté
RW	10	Kylian Mbappé		(substituted off) 75'
AM	7	Antoine Griezmann		(substituted off) 80'
LW	14	Blaise Matuidi	(yellow card) 16'
CF	9	Olivier Giroud
Substitutions:
FW	11	Ousmane Dembélé		(substituted on) 75'
FW	18	Nabil Fekir		(substituted on) 80'
MF	15	Steven Nzonzi		(substituted on) 89'
Manager:
Didier Deschamps

GK	1	Pedro Gallese
RB	17	Luis Advíncula
CB	15	Christian Ramos
CB	2	Alberto Rodríguez		(substituted off) 46'
LB	6	Miguel Trauco
CM	23	Pedro Aquino	(yellow card) 81'
CM	19	Yoshimar Yotún		(substituted off) 46'
RW	18	André Carrillo
AM	8	Christian Cueva		(substituted off) 82'
LW	20	Edison Flores
CF	9	Paolo Guerrero (c)	(yellow card) 23'
Substitutions:
FW	10	Jefferson Farfán		(substituted on) 46'
DF	4	Anderson Santamaría		(substituted on) 46'
FW	11	Raúl Ruidíaz		(substituted on) 82'
Manager:
(Argentina) Ricardo Gareca

Man of the Match:
Kylian Mbappé (France)

Assistant referees:
Mohamed Al Hammadi (United Arab Emirates)
Hasan Al Mahri (United Arab Emirates)
Fourth official:
Janny Sikazwe (Zambia)
Reserve assistant referee:
Jerson Dos Santos (Angola)
Video assistant referee:
Daniele Orsato (Italy)
Assistant video assistant referees:
Abdulrahman Al-Jassim (Qatar)
Taleb Al Maari (Qatar)
Szymon Marciniak (Poland)

=== Denmark vs France ===
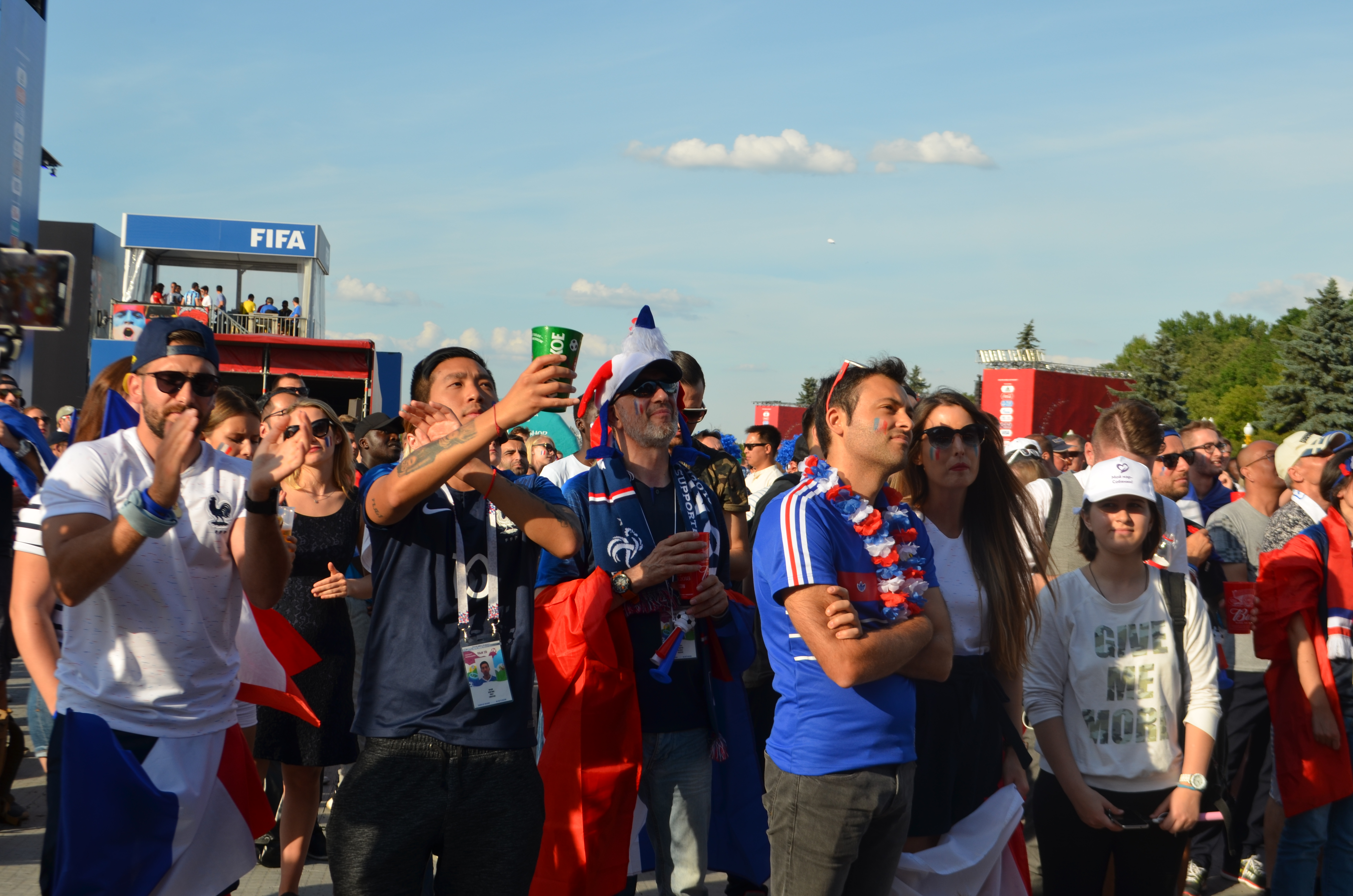
France supporters at the FIFA Fan Fest in Moscow watch the second half of the match on the big screen.

The two teams had faced each other in 15 matches, including two World Cup group stage matches, in 1998, won by France 2–1, and in 2002, won by Denmark 2–0.

Olivier Giroud and Raphaël Varane sent early efforts off target. In the 38th minute a strike from Antoine Griezmann was straight at Kasper Schmeichel. Steve Mandanda spilled a long-range Christian Eriksen free-kick before recovering to claim the loose ball ahead of lurking striker Andreas Cornelius. Eriksen shot wide in the 59th minute, although France substitute Nabil Fekir shot at the side-netting with a drive shortly after his introduction for Griezmann. Fekir forced a stop from Schmeichel in the 82nd minute, while Giroud had a late penalty appeal rejected by the referee.

This was the only goalless draw of the 2018 World Cup; there were 36 matches played prior to this one, beating the previous record number of matches without a goalless draw to start a World Cup finals, set in 1954, when all 26 matches saw at least one goal.

26 June 2018
17:00 MSK (UTC+3)

Denmark	0–0	France

Luzhniki Stadium, Moscow
Attendance: 78,011
Referee: Sandro Ricci (Brazil)

Denmark	France

GK	1	Kasper Schmeichel
RB	14	Henrik Dalsgaard
CB	4	Simon Kjær (c)
CB	6	Andreas Christensen
LB	17	Jens Stryger Larsen
CM	8	Thomas Delaney		(substituted off) 90+2'
CM	13	Mathias Jørgensen	(yellow card) 45+3'
CM	10	Christian Eriksen
RF	23	Pione Sisto		(substituted off) 60'
CF	21	Andreas Cornelius		(substituted off) 75'
LF	11	Martin Braithwaite
Substitutions:
FW	15	Viktor Fischer		(substituted on) 60'
FW	12	Kasper Dolberg		(substituted on) 75'
MF	18	Lukas Lerager		(substituted on) 90+2'
Manager:
(Norway) Åge Hareide

GK	16	Steve Mandanda
RB	19	Djibril Sidibé
CB	4	Raphaël Varane (c)
CB	3	Presnel Kimpembe
LB	21	Lucas Hernandez	(substituted off) 50'
CM	13	N'Golo Kanté
CM	15	Steven Nzonzi
RW	11	Ousmane Dembélé	(substituted off) 78'
AM	7	Antoine Griezmann	(substituted off) 68'
LW	8	Thomas Lemar
CF	9	Olivier Giroud
Substitutions:
DF	22	Benjamin Mendy	(substituted on) 50'
FW	18	Nabil Fekir	(substituted on) 68'
FW	10	Kylian Mbappé	(substituted on) 78'
Manager:
Didier Deschamps

Man of the Match:
N'Golo Kanté (France)

Assistant referees:
Emerson de Carvalho (Brazil)
Marcelo Van Gasse (Brazil)
Fourth official:
Gianluca Rocchi (Italy)
Reserve assistant referee:
Mauro Tonolini (Italy)
Video assistant referee:
Mauro Vigliano (Argentina)
Assistant video assistant referees:
Wilton Sampaio (Brazil)
Carlos Astroza (Chile)
Tiago Martins (Portugal)

=== Australia vs Peru ===
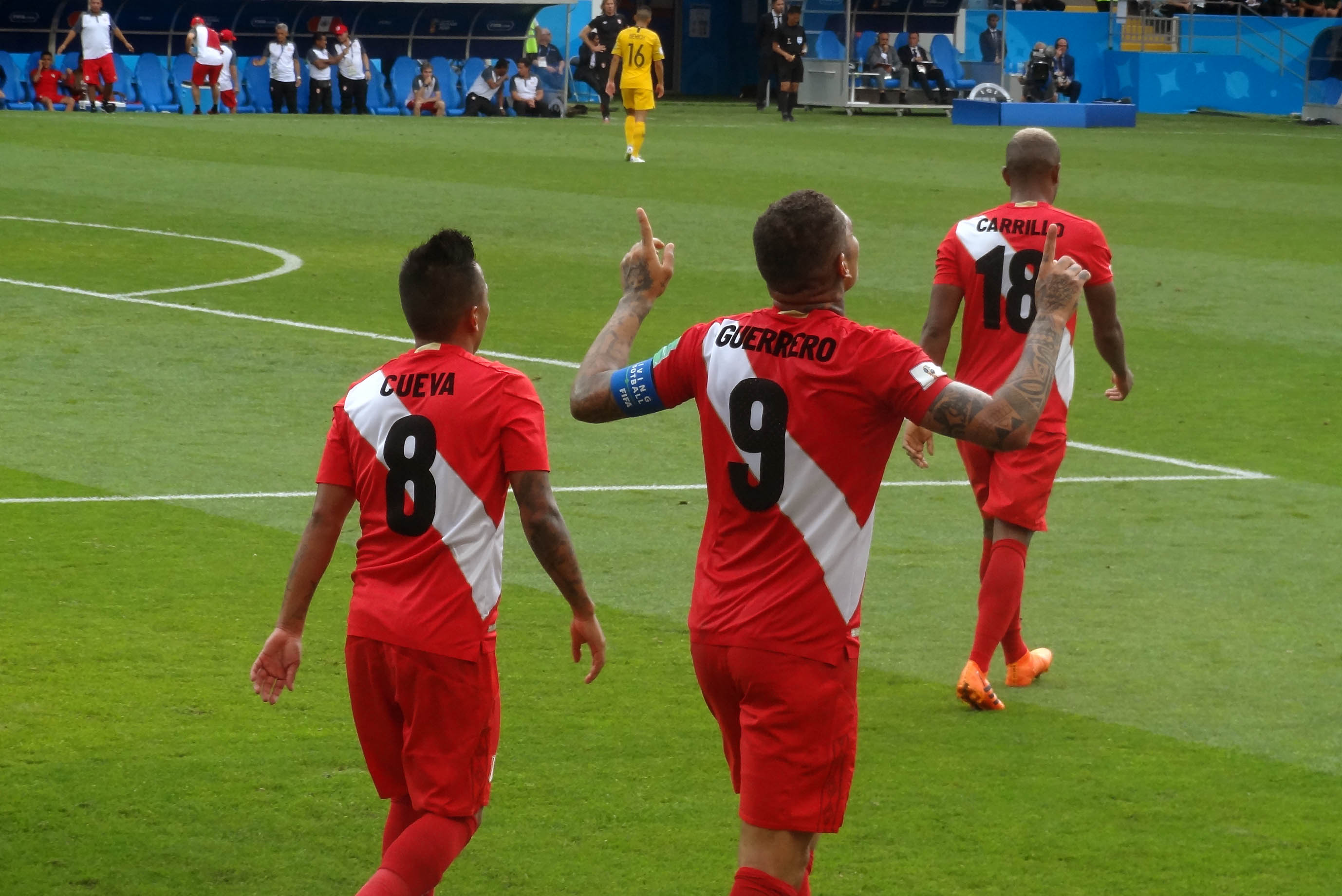
Paolo Guerrero celebrating his goal

The two teams had never met before.

Mile Jedinak was booked for a high boot on Christian Cueva after nine minutes of the first half. At the 18th minute, Paolo Guerrero broke into the penalty area, cut back onto his right foot and swung a deep cross for André Carrillo to lash a volley through Jedinak's legs and into the bottom right corner of the net. Tom Rogic beat three defenders on a run into the penalty area after 26 minutes and saw his shot saved by Pedro Gallese, before Mathew Leckie was denied by an Anderson Santamaría tackle as he slid in on goal. Five minutes into the second half, Guerrero hooked the ball into the far corner of the net beyond Mathew Ryan's left hand. Jedinak's far-post header was saved by Gallese and Trent Sainsbury shot wide from close range, while substitute Tim Cahill had a volley blocked inside the penalty area. Edison Flores crashed a low drive onto the post from the edge of the box in the closing minutes, but the offside flag was raised.

Carrillo became the first Peru player to score at a World Cup in 36 years. He ended a barren run of 205 minutes since Guillermo La Rosa struck in a 5–1 loss to Poland during Spain 1982. Peru won their first match at the World Cup since a 4–1 win over Iran in 1978. Guerrero – aged 34 years and 176 days – became the third oldest South American scorer at the World Cup, behind only Argentina's Martín Palermo (36 years, 227 days) and Obdulio Varela of Uruguay (36 years 279 days). Cahill became the first Australian to appear at four different World Cup finals. For Australia, they had not won any World Cup matches since their last major victory in the 2010 FIFA World Cup, beating Serbia 2–1; and also Australia had not defeated any South American team in the World Cup, having been beaten by Brazil 0–2 in 2006, drew 0–0 and lost 1–3 to Chile in 1974 and 2014.

26 June 2018
17:00 MSK (UTC+3)

Australia	0–2	Peru
		Carrillo 18'; Guerrero 50'

Fisht Olympic Stadium, Sochi
Attendance: 44,073
Referee: Sergei Karasev (Russia)

Australia	Peru

GK	1	Mathew Ryan
RB	19	Josh Risdon
CB	20	Trent Sainsbury
CB	5	Mark Milligan	(yellow card) 88'
LB	16	Aziz Behich
CM	15	Mile Jedinak (c)	(yellow card) 10'
CM	13	Aaron Mooy
RW	7	Mathew Leckie
AM	23	Tom Rogic	(yellow card) 66'	(substituted off) 72'
LW	10	Robbie Kruse		(substituted off) 58'
CF	9	Tomi Juric		(substituted off) 53'
Substitutions:
FW	4	Tim Cahill		(substituted on) 53'
MF	17	Daniel Arzani	(yellow card) 60'	(substituted on) 58'
MF	22	Jackson Irvine		(substituted on) 72'
Manager:
(Netherlands) Bert van Marwijk

GK	1	Pedro Gallese
RB	17	Luis Advíncula
CB	15	Christian Ramos
CB	4	Anderson Santamaría
LB	6	Miguel Trauco
CM	13	Renato Tapia		(substituted off) 63'
CM	19	Yoshimar Yotún	(yellow card) 45'	(substituted off) 46'
RW	18	André Carrillo		(substituted off) 79'
AM	8	Christian Cueva
LW	20	Edison Flores
CF	9	Paolo Guerrero (c)
Substitutions:
MF	23	Pedro Aquino		(substituted on) 46'
MF	7	Paolo Hurtado	(yellow card) 79'	(substituted on) 63'
MF	16	Wilder Cartagena		(substituted on) 79'
Manager:
(Argentina) Ricardo Gareca

Man of the Match:
André Carrillo (Peru)

Assistant referees:
Anton Averianov (Russia)
Tikhon Kalugin (Russia)
Fourth official:
Ryuji Sato (Japan)
Reserve assistant referee:
Toru Sagara (Japan)
Video assistant referee:
Danny Makkelie (Netherlands)
Assistant video assistant referees:
Jair Marrufo (United States)
Mark Borsch (Germany)
Bastian Dankert (Germany)

== Discipline ==
Fair play points would have been used as tiebreakers if the overall and head-to-head records of teams were tied. These were calculated based on yellow and red cards received in all group matches as follows:

- first yellow card: minus 1 point;
- indirect red card (second yellow card): minus 3 points;
- direct red card: minus 4 points;
- yellow card and direct red card: minus 5 points;

Only one of the above deductions were applied to a player in a single match.

Team	Match 1				Match 2				Match 3				Points
Team	Booked	(yellow card) (yellow-red card)	Sent off (straight red)	(yellow card) (red card)	Booked	(yellow card) (yellow-red card)	Sent off (straight red)	(yellow card) (red card)	Booked	(yellow card) (yellow-red card)	Sent off (straight red)	(yellow card) (red card)	Points
France	1				2								−3
Denmark	2				2				1				−5
Peru	1				2				2				−5
Australia	3								4				−7

== See also ==
- Australia at the FIFA World Cup
- Denmark at the FIFA World Cup
- France at the FIFA World Cup
- Peru at the FIFA World Cup
