= 2018 FIFA World Cup Group B =

Football tournament

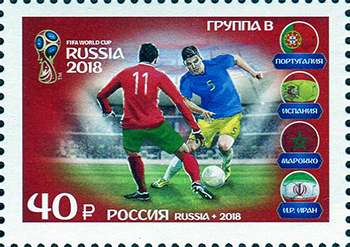
2018 postage stamp from Russia depicting group B of the 2018 FIFA World Cup group stage

Group B of the 2018 FIFA World Cup took place from 15 to 25 June 2018. The group consisted of Portugal, Spain, Morocco, and Iran. The top two teams, Spain and Portugal, advanced to the round of 16.

== Teams ==
Draw position	Team	Pot	Confederation	Method of qualification	Date of qualification	Finals appearance	Last appearance	Previous best performance	FIFA Rankings	
Draw position	Team	Pot	Confederation	Method of qualification	Date of qualification	Finals appearance	Last appearance	Previous best performance	October 2017 (Note: The rankings of October 2017 were used for seeding for the final draw.)	June 2018
B1	Portugal	1	UEFA	UEFA group B winners	10 October 2017	7th	2014	Third place (1966)	3	4
B2	Spain	2	UEFA	UEFA group G winners	6 October 2017	15th	2014	Winners (2010)	8	10
B3	Morocco	4	CAF	CAF third round group C winners	11 November 2017	5th	1998	Round of 16 (1986)	48	41
B4	Iran	3	AFC	AFC third round group A winners	12 June 2017	5th	2014	Group stage (1978, 1998, 2006, 2014)	34	37

== Standings ==
Pos	Team	Pld	W	D	L	GF	GA	GD	Pts	Qualification
1	Spain	3	1	2	0	6	5	+1	5	Advance to knockout stage
2	Portugal	3	1	2	0	5	4	+1	5	Advance to knockout stage
3	Iran	3	1	1	1	2	2	0	4	
4	Morocco	3	0	1	2	2	4	−2	1	

Source: FIFA
Rules for classification: Group stage tiebreakers

In the round of 16:

- The winners of Group B, Spain, advanced to play the runners-up of Group A, Russia.
- The runners-up of Group B, Portugal, advanced to play the winners of Group A, Uruguay.

== Matches ==
All times listed are local time.

=== Morocco vs Iran ===
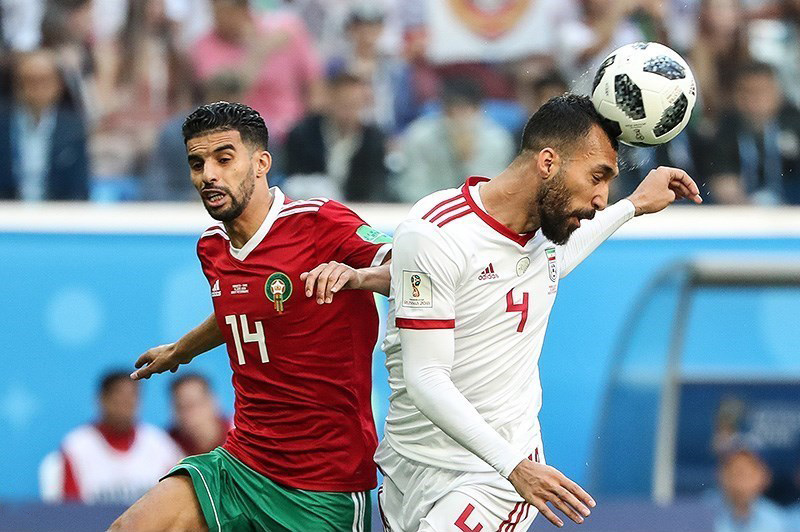
Mbark Boussoufa vs Rouzbeh Cheshmi

The two teams had never met before.

Amine Harit fired wide with a volley from the edge of the penalty area after two minutes. Younès Belhanda and Medhi Benatia squandered close-range chances in a penalty box before Iran finally countered after 20 minutes, only for Karim Ansarifard to scuff his shot when clean through on goal. Sardar Azmoun then latched onto Omid Ebrahimi's through ball, but his shot was too low and Munir Mohamedi saved low with his feet. In the final 10 minutes Hakim Ziyech lashed the ball towards the bottom-left corner of the net from 20 yards but Alireza Beiranvand stopped the ball. In the last minutes, Ehsan Hajsafi's delivery from the left was met by a header from Aziz Bouhaddouz that flew into the left corner of his own net.

Iran won just their second match at the World Cup (D3 L8), with this is their first victory since beating the United States 2–1 in June 1998. Iran did not attempt a single shot in the second half and were the first team since 1966 to score a goal in a half of World Cup football without attempting a shot. Iran also maintained their unbeaten streak against CAF teams in the World Cup, having drawn Angola 1–1 in 2006 and Nigeria 0–0 in 2014; while this was also Iran's first ever victory against any Arab team in the World Cup.

15 June 2018
18:00 MSK (UTC+3)

Morocco	0–1	Iran
		Bouhaddouz 90+5' (o.g.)

Krestovsky Stadium, Saint Petersburg
Attendance: 62,548
Referee: Cüneyt Çakır (Turkey)

Morocco	Iran

GK	12	Munir Mohamedi
CB	2	Achraf Hakimi
CB	5	Medhi Benatia (c)
CB	6	Romain Saïss
RM	14	Mbark Boussoufa
CM	7	Hakim Ziyech
CM	8	Karim El Ahmadi	(yellow card) 34'
LM	18	Amine Harit		(substituted off) 82'
RF	16	Nordin Amrabat		(substituted off) 76'
CF	9	Ayoub El Kaabi		(substituted off) 77'
LF	10	Younès Belhanda
Substitutions:
MF	21	Sofyan Amrabat		(substituted on) 76'
FW	20	Aziz Bouhaddouz		(substituted on) 77'
DF	4	Manuel da Costa		(substituted on) 82'
Manager:
(France) Hervé Renard

GK	1	Alireza Beiranvand
CB	23	Ramin Rezaeian
CB	4	Rouzbeh Cheshmi
CB	8	Morteza Pouraliganji
RM	10	Karim Ansarifard	(yellow card) 90+2'
CM	9	Omid Ebrahimi		(substituted off) 81'
CM	3	Ehsan Hajsafi
LM	7	Masoud Shojaei (c)	(yellow card) 10'	(substituted off) 68'
RF	18	Alireza Jahanbakhsh	(yellow card) 47'	(substituted off) 85'
CF	20	Sardar Azmoun
LF	11	Vahid Amiri
Substitutions:
FW	17	Mehdi Taremi		(substituted on) 68'
DF	19	Majid Hosseini		(substituted on) 81'
FW	14	Saman Ghoddos		(substituted on) 85'
Manager:
(Portugal) Carlos Queiroz

Man of the Match:
Amine Harit (Morocco)

Assistant referees:
Bahattin Duran (Turkey)
Tarık Ongun (Turkey)
Fourth official:
Sergei Karasev (Russia)
Reserve assistant referee:
Anton Averianov (Russia)
Video assistant referee:
Felix Zwayer (Germany)
Assistant video assistant referees:
Bastian Dankert (Germany)
Mark Borsch (Germany)
Jair Marrufo (United States)

=== Portugal vs Spain ===
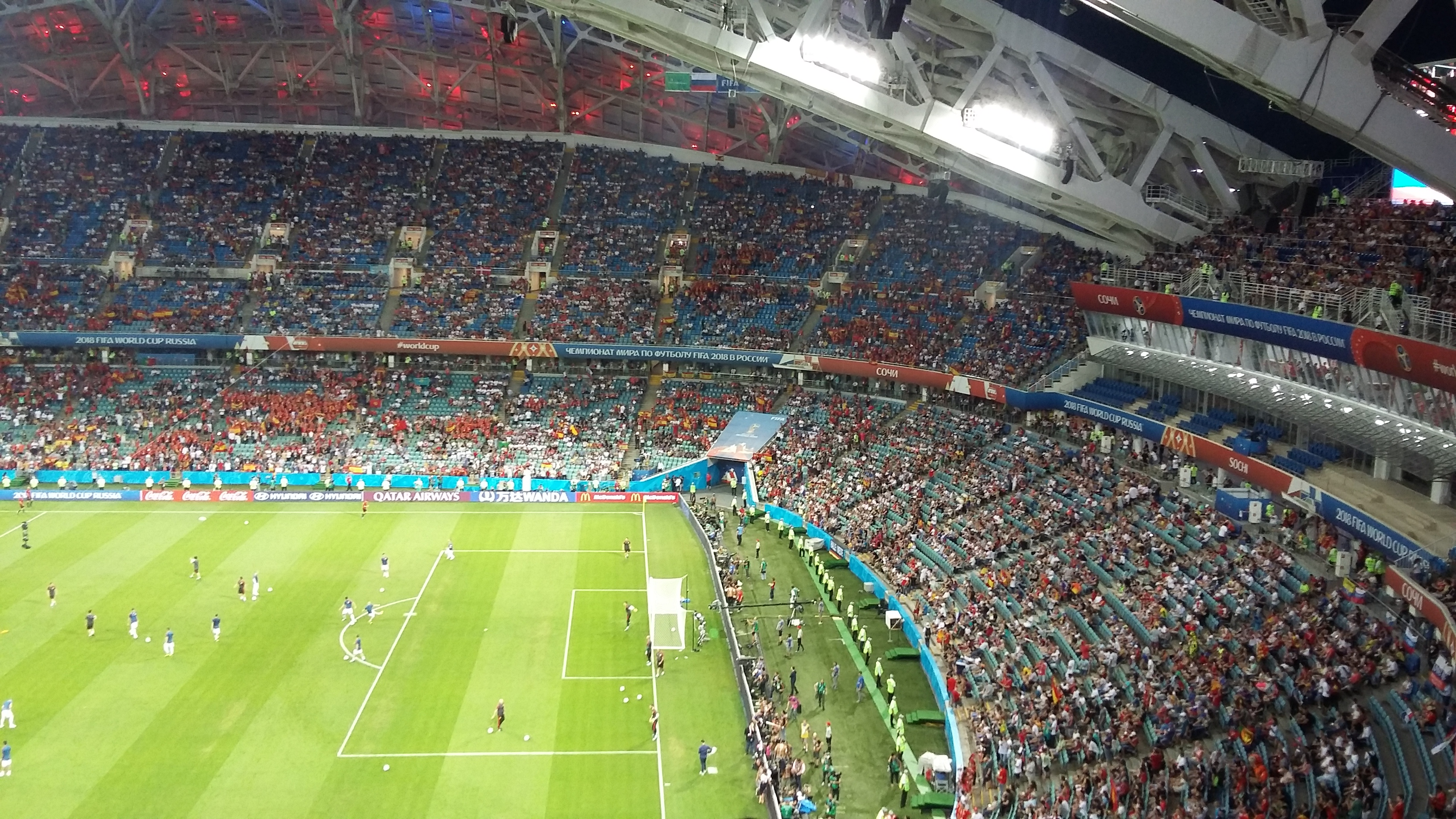
Portugal vs Spain

The two teams had met in 35 previous matches, including in the round of 16 of the 2010 FIFA World Cup, won by Spain 1–0. Their most recent meeting was in the UEFA Euro 2012 semi-finals, when Spain won 4–2 on penalties after a goalless draw in normal time.

Cristiano Ronaldo scored with an early penalty, winning it after he was fouled by Nacho inside the box. Diego Costa then twisted and turned away from two Portugal defenders to score with a low shot to the left corner which brought the two sides level. But just before the break, David de Gea fumbled a Ronaldo shot from outside the penalty box through his gloves and over the line. Costa scored his second equaliser of the night just after the restart from close range before Nacho scored with a right foot half-volley in off the post from the edge of the penalty box, his first goal for Spain. As the clock ticked down, however, Gerard Piqué brought down Ronaldo just outside the box, with the Portugal star completing the scoring and his hat-trick with a free-kick into the top right corner of the net.

Ronaldo became the fourth player to score in four different World Cup tournaments (2006, 2010, 2014 and 2018) after Pelé, Uwe Seeler and Miroslav Klose, and also the first to score in eight consecutive World Cups and European Championships. At age 33, Ronaldo also became the oldest hat-trick scorer in the World Cup, surpassing Rob Rensenbrink of the Netherlands, who scored three times against Iran in 1978, aged 30. With this result, Spain had not won any opening matches since 2006, having lost to Switzerland 0–1 in 2010 and the Netherlands 1–5 in 2014. This would end in 2022 with a 7-0 over Costa Rica, before they were held to a draw by Cabo Verde in their opening match in 2026.

15 June 2018
21:00 MSK (UTC+3)

Portugal	3–3	Spain
Ronaldo 4' (pen.), 44', 88'		Costa 24', 55'; Nacho 58'

Fisht Olympic Stadium, Sochi
Attendance: 43,866
Referee: Gianluca Rocchi (Italy)

Portugal	Spain

GK	1	Rui Patrício
RB	21	Cédric
CB	3	Pepe
CB	6	José Fonte
LB	5	Raphaël Guerreiro
CM	14	William Carvalho
CM	8	João Moutinho
RW	11	Bernardo Silva		(substituted off) 69'
AM	17	Gonçalo Guedes		(substituted off) 80'
LW	16	Bruno Fernandes	(yellow card) 28'	(substituted off) 68'
CF	7	Cristiano Ronaldo (c)
Substitutions:
MF	10	João Mário		(substituted on) 68'
FW	20	Ricardo Quaresma		(substituted on) 69'
FW	9	André Silva		(substituted on) 80'
Manager:
Fernando Santos

GK	1	David de Gea
RB	4	Nacho
CB	3	Gerard Piqué
CB	15	Sergio Ramos (c)
LB	18	Jordi Alba
CM	5	Sergio Busquets	(yellow card) 17'
CM	8	Koke
RW	21	David Silva		(substituted off) 86'
AM	22	Isco
LW	6	Andrés Iniesta		(substituted off) 70'
CF	19	Diego Costa		(substituted off) 77'
Substitutions:
MF	10	Thiago		(substituted on) 70'
FW	17	Iago Aspas		(substituted on) 77'
FW	11	Lucas Vázquez		(substituted on) 86'
Manager:
Fernando Hierro

Man of the Match:
Cristiano Ronaldo (Portugal)

Assistant referees:
Elenito Di Liberatore (Italy)
Mauro Tonolini (Italy)
Fourth official:
Ryuji Sato (Japan)
Reserve assistant referee:
Toru Sagara (Japan)
Video assistant referee:
Massimiliano Irrati (Italy)
Assistant video assistant referees:
Paolo Valeri (Italy)
Carlos Astroza (Chile)
Daniele Orsato (Italy)

=== Portugal vs Morocco ===
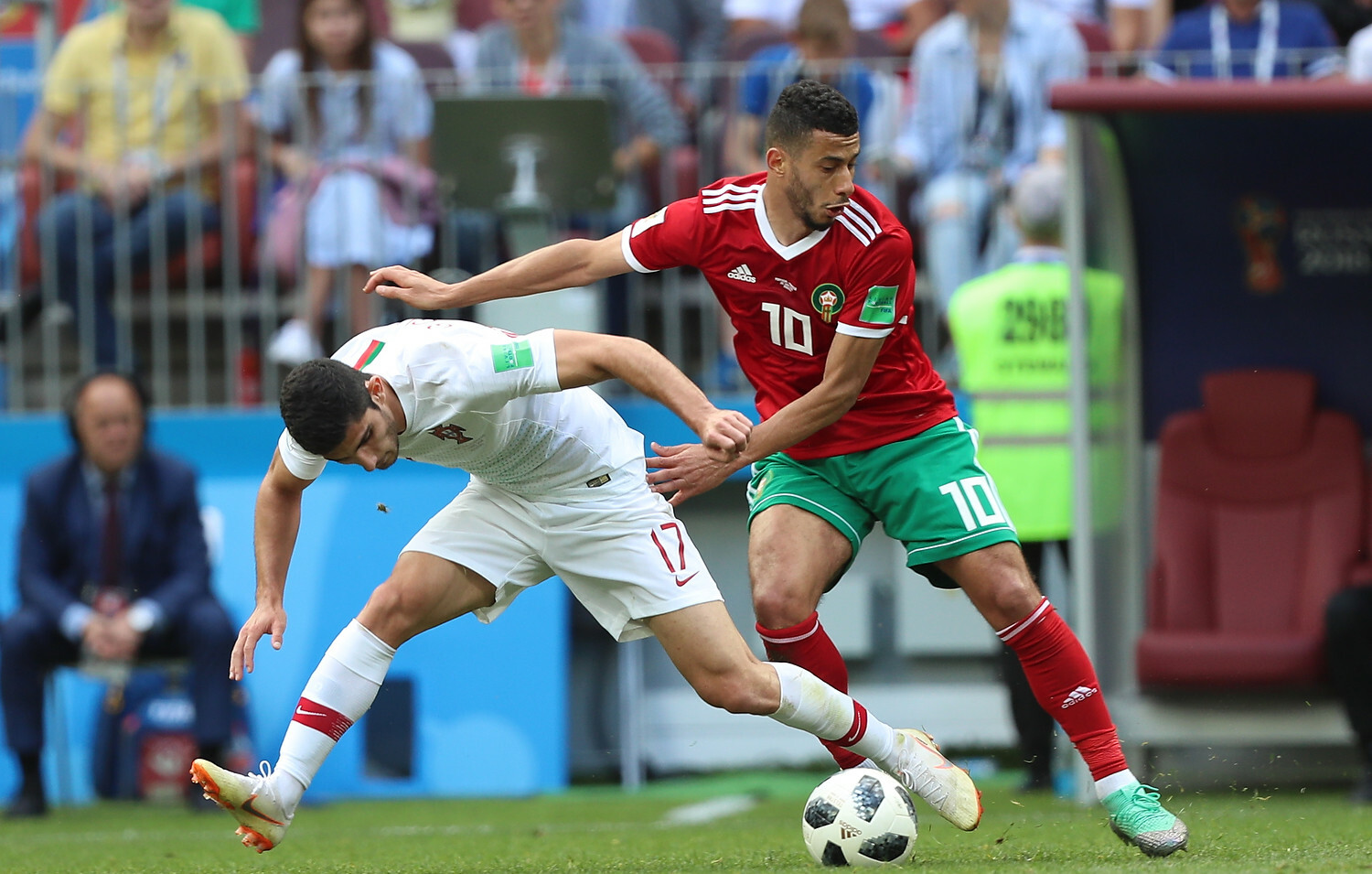
Younès Belhanda vs Gonçalo Guedes

The two teams had met previously only once, a group stage game in the 1986 FIFA World Cup, won by Morocco 3–1.

João Moutinho swung in a cross from the right after a short corner and Cristiano Ronaldo headed the ball powerfully past goalkeeper Munir Mohamedi from six yards out and into the middle of the goal to open the scoring in the 4th minute. Ronaldo played Gonçalo Guedes into the box but Munir made a one-handed save. Ronaldo shot over the crossbar when Bernardo Silva's mishit presented him with a shooting chance on the edge of the box early in the second half. Rui Patrício then made a save to preserve Portugal's lead when Hakim Ziyech's free-kick was headed towards goal by Younès Belhanda, the goalkeeper diving to palm the ball away from danger. Ziyech shot another set-piece just over the crossbar from 25 yards. Nordin Amrabat and Medhi Benatia fired over with better chances. With their second loss in a row, Morocco became the first team to be eliminated from the 2018 FIFA World Cup.

85 international goals for Ronaldo is a new record for a European player, with Ronaldo passing Ferenc Puskás to hold the record outright. Ronaldo has become the first Portuguese player since José Torres in 1966 to score a goal with his right foot, left foot and head in a single World Cup tournament. Ronaldo is the first player to score five consecutive World Cup goals for his team since Oleg Salenko for Russia in 1994.

20 June 2018
15:00 MSK (UTC+3)

Portugal	1–0	Morocco
Ronaldo 4'

Luzhniki Stadium, Moscow
Attendance: 78,011
Referee: Mark Geiger (United States)

Portugal	Morocco

GK	1	Rui Patrício
RB	21	Cédric
CB	3	Pepe
CB	6	José Fonte
LB	5	Raphaël Guerreiro
RM	11	Bernardo Silva		(substituted off) 59'
CM	14	William Carvalho
CM	8	João Moutinho		(substituted off) 89'
LM	10	João Mário		(substituted off) 70'
CF	17	Gonçalo Guedes
CF	7	Cristiano Ronaldo (c)
Substitutions:
FW	18	Gelson Martins		(substituted on) 59'
MF	16	Bruno Fernandes		(substituted on) 70'
MF	23	Adrien Silva	(yellow card) 90+2'	(substituted on) 89'
Manager:
Fernando Santos

GK	12	Munir Mohamedi
RB	17	Nabil Dirar
CB	5	Medhi Benatia (c)	(yellow card) 40'
CB	4	Manuel da Costa
LB	2	Achraf Hakimi
CM	8	Karim El Ahmadi		(substituted off) 86'
CM	14	Mbark Boussoufa
RW	16	Nordin Amrabat
AM	10	Younès Belhanda		(substituted off) 75'
LW	7	Hakim Ziyech
CF	13	Khalid Boutaïb		(substituted off) 70'
Substitutions:
FW	9	Ayoub El Kaabi		(substituted on) 70'
MF	23	Mehdi Carcela		(substituted on) 75'
MF	11	Fayçal Fajr		(substituted on) 86'
Manager:
(France) Hervé Renard

Man of the Match:
Cristiano Ronaldo (Portugal)

Assistant referees:
Joe Fletcher (Canada)
Frank Anderson (United States)
Fourth official:
Sergei Karasev (Russia)
Reserve assistant referee:
Anton Averianov (Russia)
Video assistant referee:
Felix Zwayer (Germany)
Assistant video assistant referees:
Jair Marrufo (United States)
Simon Lount (New Zealand)
Bastian Dankert (Germany)

=== Iran vs Spain ===
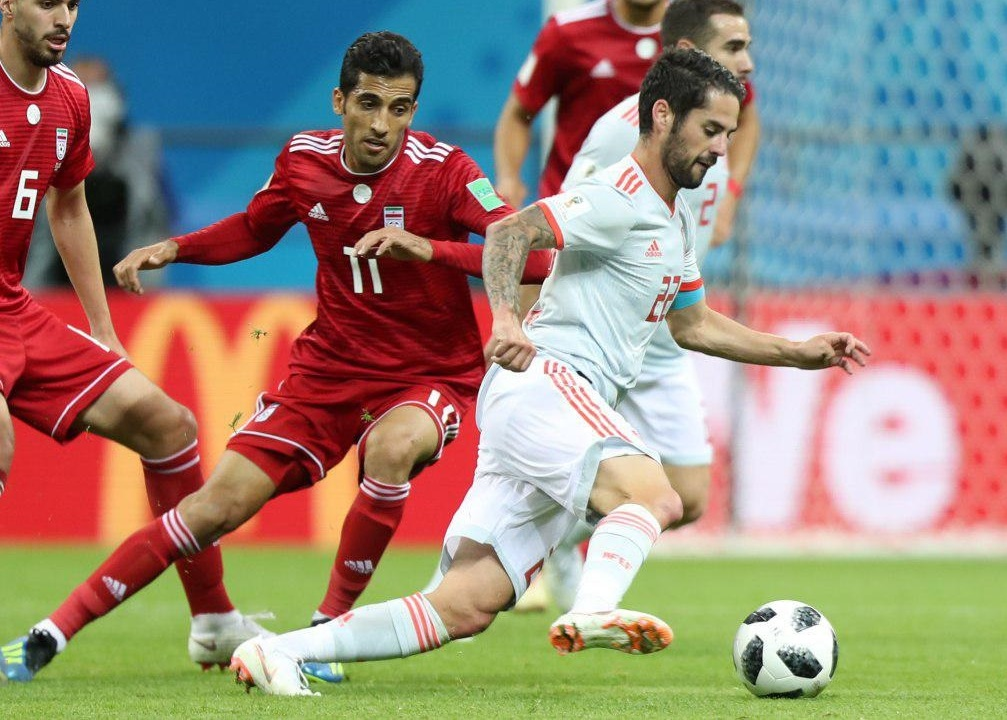
Vahid Amiri vs Isco

The two teams had never met before.

Spain had their first attempt on goal in the 25th minute when David Silva's long-range free-kick was held by Alireza Beiranvand. Five minutes later, Silva's volley sailed narrowly over the crossbar from six yards out. At the start of the 2nd half, Gerard Piqué's close-range effort was blocked and then Beiranvand palmed away Sergio Busquets' curled effort from the edge of the penalty area. Karim Ansarifard's effort from a corner flashed into David de Gea's side netting. In the 54th minute, Diego Costa picked up Andrés Iniesta's pass inside the area and saw Ramin Rezaeian's attempted clearance ricochet off his leg and past Beiranvand low into the left corner of the net. Saeid Ezatolahi pulled Iran level shortly after the hour but his close-range finish after a scramble was ruled out courtesy of VAR after Rezaeian was found in an offside position. Mehdi Taremi's back-post header fizzed over De Gea's crossbar seven minutes from time as Iran pushed for an equaliser, but Spain held on for a 1–0 win.

Iran did not manage a shot on target for the first time in 14 World Cup games.

20 June 2018
21:00 MSK (UTC+3)

Iran	0–1	Spain
		Costa 54'

Kazan Arena, Kazan
Attendance: 42,718
Referee: Andrés Cunha (Uruguay)

Iran	Spain

GK	1	Alireza Beiranvand
RB	23	Ramin Rezaeian
CB	19	Majid Hosseini
CB	8	Morteza Pouraliganji
LB	3	Ehsan Hajsafi (c)		(substituted off) 69'
CM	9	Omid Ebrahimi	(yellow card) 90+2'
CM	6	Saeid Ezatolahi
RW	10	Karim Ansarifard		(substituted off) 74'
AM	17	Mehdi Taremi
LW	11	Vahid Amiri	(yellow card) 79'	(substituted off) 86'
CF	20	Sardar Azmoun
Substitutions:
DF	5	Milad Mohammadi		(substituted on) 69'
FW	18	Alireza Jahanbakhsh		(substituted on) 74'
FW	14	Saman Ghoddos		(substituted on) 86'
Manager:
(Portugal) Carlos Queiroz

GK	1	David de Gea
RB	2	Dani Carvajal
CB	3	Gerard Piqué
CB	15	Sergio Ramos (c)
LB	18	Jordi Alba
CM	5	Sergio Busquets
CM	6	Andrés Iniesta	(substituted off) 71'
RW	21	David Silva
AM	22	Isco
LW	11	Lucas Vázquez	(substituted off) 79'
CF	19	Diego Costa	(substituted off) 89'
Substitutions:
MF	8	Koke	(substituted on) 71'
MF	20	Marco Asensio	(substituted on) 79'
FW	9	Rodrigo	(substituted on) 89'
Manager:
Fernando Hierro

Man of the Match:
Diego Costa (Spain)

Assistant referees:
Nicolás Taran (Uruguay)
Mauricio Espinosa (Uruguay)
Fourth official:
Julio Bascuñán (Chile)
Reserve assistant referee:
Christian Schiemann (Chile)
Video assistant referee:
Mauro Vigliano (Argentina)
Assistant video assistant referees:
Wilton Sampaio (Brazil)
Alexander Guzmán (Colombia)
Massimiliano Irrati (Italy)

=== Iran vs Portugal ===
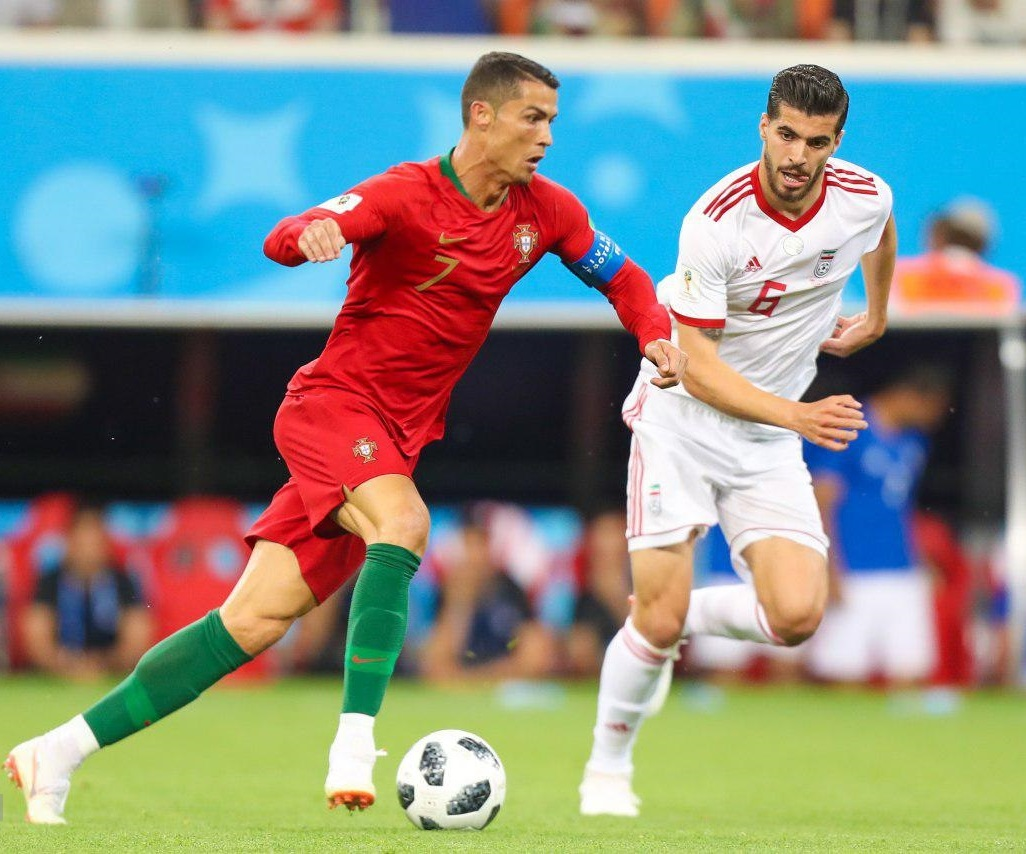
Cristiano Ronaldo vs Saeid Ezatolahi

The two teams had met twice, most recently in a group stage game in the 2006 FIFA World Cup, won by Portugal 2–0.

In the 45 minute, Ricardo Quaresma cut in from the right before scoring with a curling shot off the outside of his right foot that looped over Alireza Beiranvand into the top-left corner. Saeid Ezatolahi's foul on Cristiano Ronaldo won Portugal a penalty, which Ronaldo shot low into the right, enabling Beiranvand to get down and make a stop. Iran then managed to get a penalty in stoppage time after referee used VAR to determine that Cédric's handball from Sardar Azmoun's header had been intentional, which Karim Ansarifard converted high to his right. The game ended in a 1−1 draw, with Portugal advancing and Iran eliminated.

Quaresma (34 years, 272 days old) is the oldest player to score on his first World Cup start since Yahya Golmohammadi (35 years, 84 days old), who did so for Iran in 2006 against Mexico. Iran's goal - scored after 92 minutes and 48 seconds - was the latest goal Portugal have ever conceded at the World Cup. This was Iran's best performance ever in the FIFA World Cup, winning four points and having earned their first ever draw against any European opponents since 1978, when Iran drew 1–1 to Scotland.

25 June 2018
21:00 MSK (UTC+3)

Iran	1–1	Portugal
Ansarifard 90+3' (pen.)		Quaresma 45'

Mordovia Arena, Saransk
Attendance: 41,685
Referee: Enrique Cáceres (Paraguay)

Iran	Portugal

GK	1	Alireza Beiranvand
RB	23	Ramin Rezaeian
CB	19	Majid Hosseini
CB	8	Morteza Pouraliganji
LB	3	Ehsan Hajsafi (c)	(yellow card) 52'	(substituted off) 56'
DM	6	Saeid Ezatolahi		(substituted off) 76'
CM	18	Alireza Jahanbakhsh		(substituted off) 70'
CM	9	Omid Ebrahimi
RW	17	Mehdi Taremi
LW	11	Vahid Amiri
CF	20	Sardar Azmoun	(yellow card) 54'
Substitutions:
DF	5	Milad Mohammadi		(substituted on) 56'
FW	14	Saman Ghoddos		(substituted on) 70'
FW	10	Karim Ansarifard		(substituted on) 76'
Manager:
(Portugal) Carlos Queiroz

GK	1	Rui Patrício
RB	21	Cédric	(yellow card) 90+8'
CB	3	Pepe
CB	6	José Fonte
LB	5	Raphaël Guerreiro	(yellow card) 33'
RM	20	Ricardo Quaresma	(yellow card) 64'	(substituted off) 70'
CM	14	William Carvalho
CM	23	Adrien Silva
LM	10	João Mário		(substituted off) 84'
CF	9	André Silva		(substituted off) 90+6'
CF	7	Cristiano Ronaldo (c)	(yellow card) 83'
Substitutions:
MF	11	Bernardo Silva		(substituted on) 70'
MF	8	João Moutinho		(substituted on) 84'
FW	17	Gonçalo Guedes		(substituted on) 90+6'
Manager:
Fernando Santos

Man of the Match:
Ricardo Quaresma (Portugal)

Assistant referees:
Eduardo Cardozo (Paraguay)
Juan Zorrilla (Paraguay)
Fourth official:
Mehdi Abid Charef (Algeria)
Reserve assistant referee:
Anouar Hmila (Tunisia)
Video assistant referee:
Massimiliano Irrati (Italy)
Assistant video assistant referees:
Gery Vargas (Bolivia)
Hernán Maidana (Argentina)
Paolo Valeri (Italy)

=== Spain vs Morocco ===
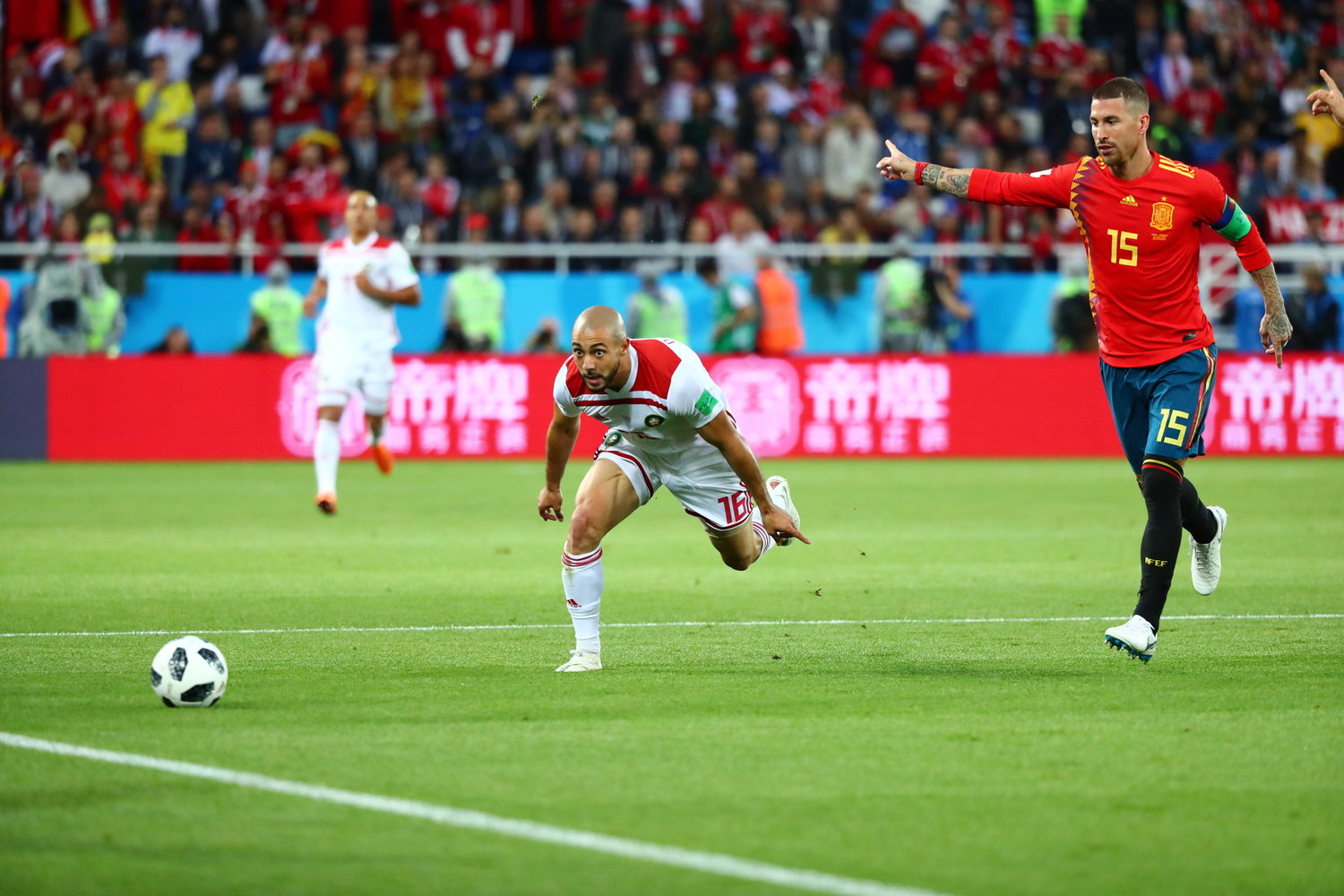
Nordin Amrabat and Sergio Ramos

Despite their geographical proximity, the two teams had faced each other only in two opportunities, both were in the 1962 FIFA World Cup qualification phase and won by Spain.

In the 14th minute, a mix-up between Sergio Ramos and Andrés Iniesta allowed Khalid Boutaïb to steal possession on the halfway line, burst through on goal and finish through the legs of David de Gea. Iniesta and Diego Costa combined to set up Isco for a close-range finish that tied the scores five minutes later. Boutaïb was clear again in the 25th minute when Morocco took a quick throw-in, but De Gea stopped the ball. Nordin Amrabat, Manuel da Costa and Mbark Boussoufa were all booked in three-minute period before Sergio Busquets headed over the crossbar from Isco's corner. Amrabat's strike from at least 25 yards out bounced off the woodwork in the 55th minute. Isco's looping header dipped under the crossbar, but Romain Saïss made a clearance, Gerard Piqué heading wide from the resulting Isco corner. Youssef En-Nesyri scored home a header to give Morocco the lead. And when Iago Aspas turned home Dani Carvajal's cross from the right after a short corner – the goal given by VAR after a long delay – Spain was tied in the first minute of added time.

Boutaïb's goal for Morocco was their first goal at the finals since 1998, when Salaheddine Bassir scored in a 3–0 win over Scotland. Ramos made his 16th appearance for Spain at the World Cup, overtaking Xavi as their most capped outfield player in the competition. Spain have failed to win their final group game at a World Cup for the first time since 1982, having won the previous eight such games.

25 June 2018
20:00 KALT (UTC+2)

Spain	2–2	Morocco
Isco 19'; Aspas 90+1'		Boutaïb 14'; En-Nesyri 81'

Kaliningrad Stadium, Kaliningrad
Attendance: 33,973
Referee: Ravshan Irmatov (Uzbekistan)

Spain	Morocco

GK	1	David de Gea
RB	2	Dani Carvajal
CB	3	Gerard Piqué
CB	15	Sergio Ramos (c)
LB	18	Jordi Alba
CM	5	Sergio Busquets
CM	10	Thiago	(substituted off) 74'
RW	21	David Silva	(substituted off) 84'
AM	22	Isco
LW	6	Andrés Iniesta
CF	19	Diego Costa	(substituted off) 74'
Substitutions:
FW	17	Iago Aspas	(substituted on) 74'
MF	20	Marco Asensio	(substituted on) 74'
FW	9	Rodrigo	(substituted on) 84'
Manager:
Fernando Hierro

GK	12	Munir Mohamedi	(yellow card) 88'
RB	17	Nabil Dirar
CB	4	Manuel da Costa	(yellow card) 31'
CB	6	Romain Saïss
LB	2	Achraf Hakimi	(yellow card) 90+3'
CM	8	Karim El Ahmadi	(yellow card) 21'
CM	14	Mbark Boussoufa (c)	(yellow card) 31'
RW	16	Nordin Amrabat	(yellow card) 29'
AM	10	Younès Belhanda		(substituted off) 63'
LW	7	Hakim Ziyech		(substituted off) 85'
CF	13	Khalid Boutaïb		(substituted off) 72'
Substitutions:
MF	11	Fayçal Fajr		(substituted on) 63'
FW	19	Youssef En-Nesyri		(substituted on) 72'
FW	20	Aziz Bouhaddouz		(substituted on) 85'
Manager:
(France) Hervé Renard

Man of the Match:
Isco (Spain)

Assistant referees:
Abdukhamidullo Rasulov (Uzbekistan)
Jakhongir Saidov (Uzbekistan)
Fourth official:
Mohammed Abdulla Hassan Mohamed (United Arab Emirates)
Reserve assistant referee:
Mohamed Al Hammadi (United Arab Emirates)
Video assistant referee:
Felix Zwayer (Germany)
Assistant video assistant referees:
Bastian Dankert (Germany)
Mark Borsch (Germany)
Danny Makkelie (Netherlands)

== Discipline ==
Fair play points would have been used as tiebreakers if the overall and head-to-head records of teams were tied. These were calculated based on yellow and red cards received in all group matches as follows:

- first yellow card: minus 1 point;
- indirect red card (second yellow card): minus 3 points;
- direct red card: minus 4 points;
- yellow card and direct red card: minus 5 points;

Only one of the above deductions were applied to a player in a single match.

Team	Match 1				Match 2				Match 3				Points
Team	Booked	(yellow card) (yellow-red card)	Sent off (straight red)	(yellow card) (red card)	Booked	(yellow card) (yellow-red card)	Sent off (straight red)	(yellow card) (red card)	Booked	(yellow card) (yellow-red card)	Sent off (straight red)	(yellow card) (red card)	Points
Spain	1												−1
Portugal	1				1				4				−6
Iran	3				2				2				−7
Morocco	1				1				6				−8

== See also ==
- Iran at the FIFA World Cup
- Morocco at the FIFA World Cup
- Portugal at the FIFA World Cup
- Spain at the FIFA World Cup
