= 2018 FIFA World Cup seeding =

Calculation of football teams before tournament

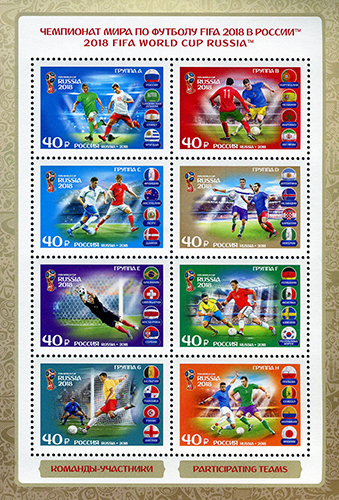
Eight 2018 postage stamps from Russia depicting the draw for the 2018 FIFA World Cup group stage.

The draw for the 2018 FIFA World Cup took place on 1 December 2017 at the State Kremlin Palace in Moscow, Russia. It determined the group in which each of the 32 qualified national teams would play in at the start of the tournament. The teams were divided into four pots of eight, with one team selected from each pot to form a group. The ceremony was co-hosted by former footballer Gary Lineker alongside Russian sports journalist Maria Komandnaya, with several well-known football personalities assisting, including Diego Maradona, Fabio Cannavaro, Cafu, Diego Forlán, Gordon Banks, Carles Puyol, Laurent Blanc, and former Russian player Nikita Simonyan.

Unlike previous editions of the World Cup, all pots were determined by each national team's October 2017 FIFA World Ranking, with Pot 1 containing the highest-ranked teams, Pot 2 containing the next highest-ranked teams, and so on until Pot 4, containing the lowest ranked teams; in previous editions only one pot containing the highest-ranked teams was determined by rank, with the other three pots determined by continental confederation. The hosts continued to be placed in Pot 1 and treated as a seeded team, and therefore Pot 1 consisted of hosts Russia and the seven highest-ranked teams that qualified for the tournament.

The draw sequence started with Pot 1 and ended with Pot 4.

As with previous editions, no group had more than one team from any continental confederation except for UEFA, which had at least one, but no more than two in a group.

== Seeding ==
Teams were seeded using the October 2017 FIFA World Rankings (shown in parentheses), which were published on 16 October 2017.

Pot 1	Pot 2	Pot 3	Pot 4
Russia (H) (65)	Spain (8)	Denmark (19)	Serbia (38)
Germany (1)	Peru (10)	Iceland (21)	Nigeria (41)
Brazil (2)	Switzerland (11)	Costa Rica (22)	Australia (43)
Portugal (3)	England (12)	Sweden (25)	Japan (44)
Argentina (4)	Colombia (13)	Tunisia (28)	Morocco (48)
Belgium (5)	Mexico (16)	Egypt (30)	Panama (49)
Poland (6)	Uruguay (17)	Senegal (32)	South Korea (62)
France (7)	Croatia (18)	Iran (34)	Saudi Arabia (63)

Notes

- H : Hosts

== Final draw ==
	Position 1	Position 2	Position 3	Position 4
Group A	Russia	Saudi Arabia	Egypt	Uruguay
Group B	Portugal	Spain	Morocco	Iran
Group C	France	Australia	Peru	Denmark
Group D	Argentina	Iceland	Croatia	Nigeria
Group E	Brazil	Switzerland	Costa Rica	Serbia
Group F	Germany	Mexico	Sweden	South Korea
Group G	Belgium	Panama	Tunisia	England
Group H	Poland	Senegal	Colombia	Japan
