= 2018 FIFA World Cup Group A =

Football tournament group stage

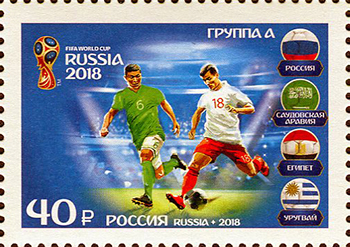
2018 postage stamp from Russia depicting group A of the 2018 FIFA World Cup group stage.

Group A of the 2018 FIFA World Cup took place from 14 to 25 June 2018. The group consisted of Russia, Saudi Arabia, Egypt, and Uruguay. The top two teams, Uruguay and Russia, advanced to the round of 16.

== Teams ==
Draw position	Team	Pot	Confederation	Method of qualification	Date of qualification	Finals appearance	Last appearance	Previous best performance	FIFA Rankings	
Draw position	Team	Pot	Confederation	Method of qualification	Date of qualification	Finals appearance	Last appearance	Previous best performance	October 2017 (Note: The rankings of October 2017 were used for seeding for the final draw.)	June 2018
A1	Russia	1	UEFA	Hosts	2 December 2010	11th (Note: This is the 4th appearance of Russia at the FIFA World Cup. However, FIFA considers Russia as the successor team of the Soviet Union, who qualified on 7 occasions.)	2014 (group stage)	Fourth place (1966) (Note: Russia's best result is group stage in 1994, 2002, and 2014. However, FIFA considers Russia as the successor team of the Soviet Union.)	65	70
A2	Saudi Arabia	4	AFC	AFC third round group B runners-up	5 September 2017	5th	2006 (group stage)	Round of 16 (1994)	63	67
A3	Egypt	3	CAF	CAF third round group E winners	8 October 2017	3rd	1990 (group stage)	First round (1934), group stage (1990)	30	45
A4	Uruguay	2	CONMEBOL	CONMEBOL Round Robin runners-up	10 October 2017	13th	2014 (round of 16)	Winners (1930, 1950)	17	14

== Standings ==
Pos	Team	Pld	W	D	L	GF	GA	GD	Pts	Qualification
1	Uruguay	3	3	0	0	5	0	+5	9	Advance to knockout stage
2	Russia (H)	3	2	0	1	8	4	+4	6	Advance to knockout stage
3	Saudi Arabia	3	1	0	2	2	7	−5	3	
4	Egypt	3	0	0	3	2	6	−4	0	

Source: FIFA
Rules for classification: Group stage tiebreakers
(H) Hosts

In the round of 16:

- The winners of group A, Uruguay, advanced to play the runners-up of group B, Portugal.
- The runners-up of Group A, Russia, advanced to play the winners of group B, Spain.

== Matches ==
All times listed are local time.

=== Russia vs Saudi Arabia ===
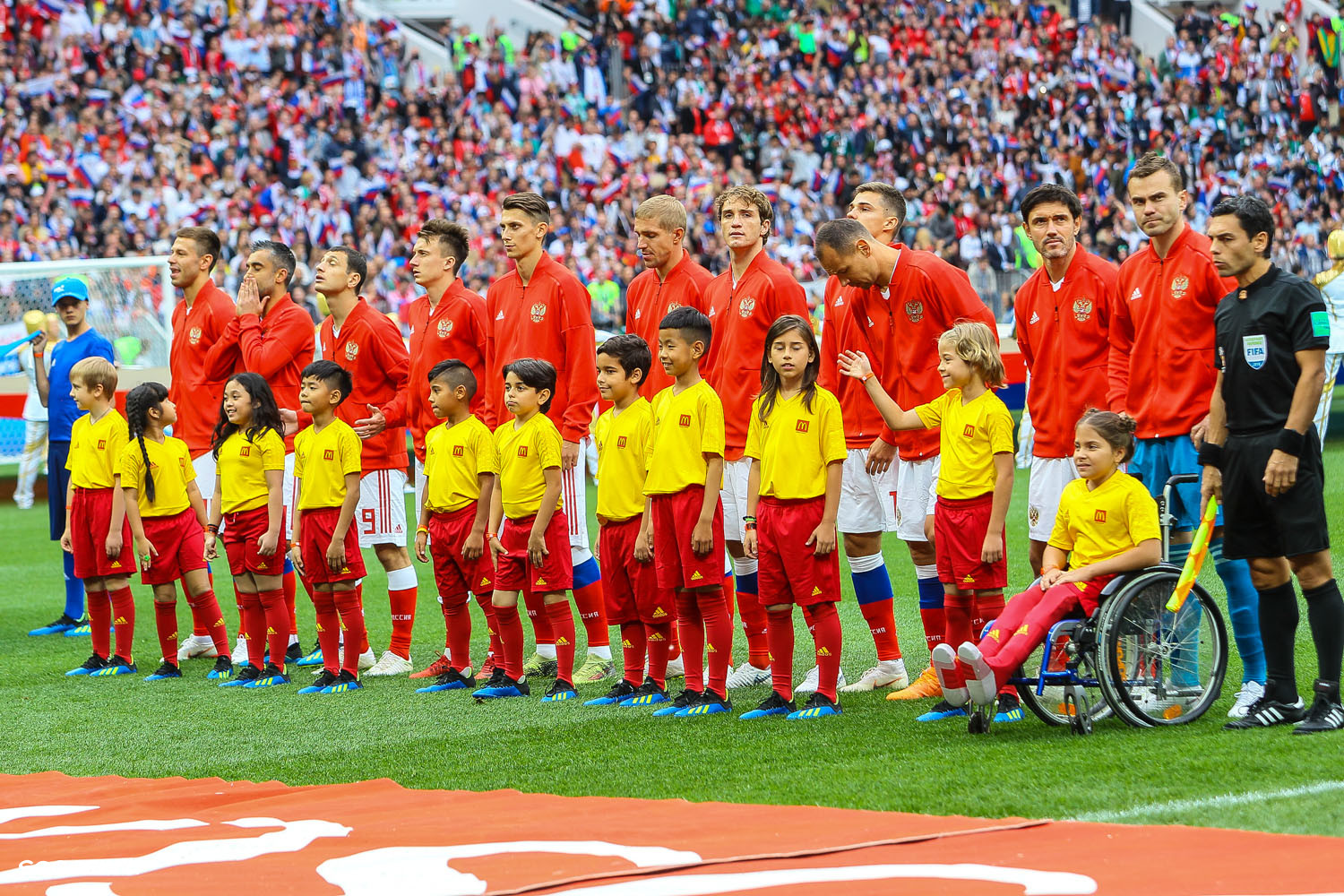
Russia national football team anthem

The two teams had met only once, a friendly game in 1993 won by Saudi Arabia 4–2.

In the 12th minute, Yury Gazinsky headed the first goal for Russia from a cross from the left before substitute Denis Cheryshev evaded several challenges and smashed home at the near post close to half-time. The tempo slowed and the atmosphere flattened after the restart, giving the whole thing the feel of a friendly match. But substitute Artem Dzyuba illuminated a match of often dubious quality with a precise header from a cross from the right to extend his team's lead just minutes after replacing Fyodor Smolov. As the match moved into injury time, Cheryshev smashed home with a crisp left-foot strike into the top right corner before Aleksandr Golovin curled a free-kick around the wall and into the right of the net.

Alan Dzagoev limped off with a hamstring injury in the 24th minute. "Alan Dzagoev damaged the muscles in the back of the thigh," Russia said in a brief statement.

For the first time in World Cup history, two players – Gazinsky and Cheryshev – scored their first international goals in the opening match. Russia's victory means that the host nation has never lost their opening match in any of the 21 editions of the World Cup (won 16, drew six). Russia (5–0) recorded the second biggest victory by a host nation in their opening match at a World Cup, after Italy v USA in 1934 (7–1); while it is also the second largest victory of any host nation, only behind Italy vs USA at 1934 and Brazil vs Sweden at 1950, both ended 7–1. Russia's Denis Cheryshev became the first substitute to score a goal in the opening match of a World Cup tournament. In this game, Sergei Ignashevich became the oldest player to ever appear in a World Cup match for Russia/USSR (38 years & 335 days old).

For Saudi Arabia, this was their second biggest defeat in World Cup, after the 0–8 defeat to Germany in 2002. These losses are also the biggest defeats for any Arab team to have participated in the FIFA World Cup.

14 June 2018
18:00 MSK (UTC+3)

Russia	5–0	Saudi Arabia
Gazinsky 12'; Cheryshev 43', 90+1'; Dzyuba 71'; Golovin 90+4'

Luzhniki Stadium, Moscow
Attendance: 78,011
Referee: Néstor Pitana (Argentina)

Russia	Saudi Arabia

GK	1	Igor Akinfeev (c)
RB	2	Mário Fernandes
CB	3	Ilya Kutepov
CB	4	Sergei Ignashevich
LB	18	Yuri Zhirkov
CM	8	Yury Gazinsky
CM	11	Roman Zobnin
RW	19	Aleksandr Samedov		(substituted off) 64'
AM	9	Alan Dzagoev		(substituted off) 24'
LW	17	Aleksandr Golovin	(yellow card) 88'
CF	10	Fyodor Smolov		(substituted off) 70'
Substitutions:
MF	6	Denis Cheryshev		(substituted on) 24'
MF	7	Daler Kuzyayev		(substituted on) 64'
FW	22	Artem Dzyuba		(substituted on) 70'
Manager:
(Russia) Stanislav Cherchesov

GK	1	Abdullah Al-Mayouf
RB	6	Mohammed Al-Breik
CB	3	Osama Hawsawi (c)
CB	5	Omar Hawsawi
LB	13	Yasser Al-Shahrani
DM	7	Salman Al-Faraj
CM	14	Abdullah Otayf		(substituted off) 64'
CM	17	Taisir Al-Jassim	(yellow card) 90+3'
RW	18	Salem Al-Dawsari
LW	8	Yahya Al-Shehri		(substituted off) 72'
CF	10	Mohammad Al-Sahlawi		(substituted off) 85'
Substitutions:
FW	19	Fahad Al-Muwallad		(substituted on) 64'
MF	9	Hattan Bahebri		(substituted on) 72'
FW	20	Muhannad Assiri		(substituted on) 85'
Manager:
(Spain) Juan Antonio Pizzi

Man of the Match:
Denis Cheryshev (Russia)

Assistant referees:
Hernán Maidana (Argentina)
Juan Pablo Belatti (Argentina)
Fourth official:
Sandro Ricci (Brazil)
Reserve assistant referee:
Emerson de Carvalho (Brazil)
Video assistant referee:
Massimiliano Irrati (Italy)
Assistant video assistant referees:
Mauro Vigliano (Argentina)
Carlos Astroza (Chile)
Daniele Orsato (Italy)

=== Egypt vs Uruguay ===
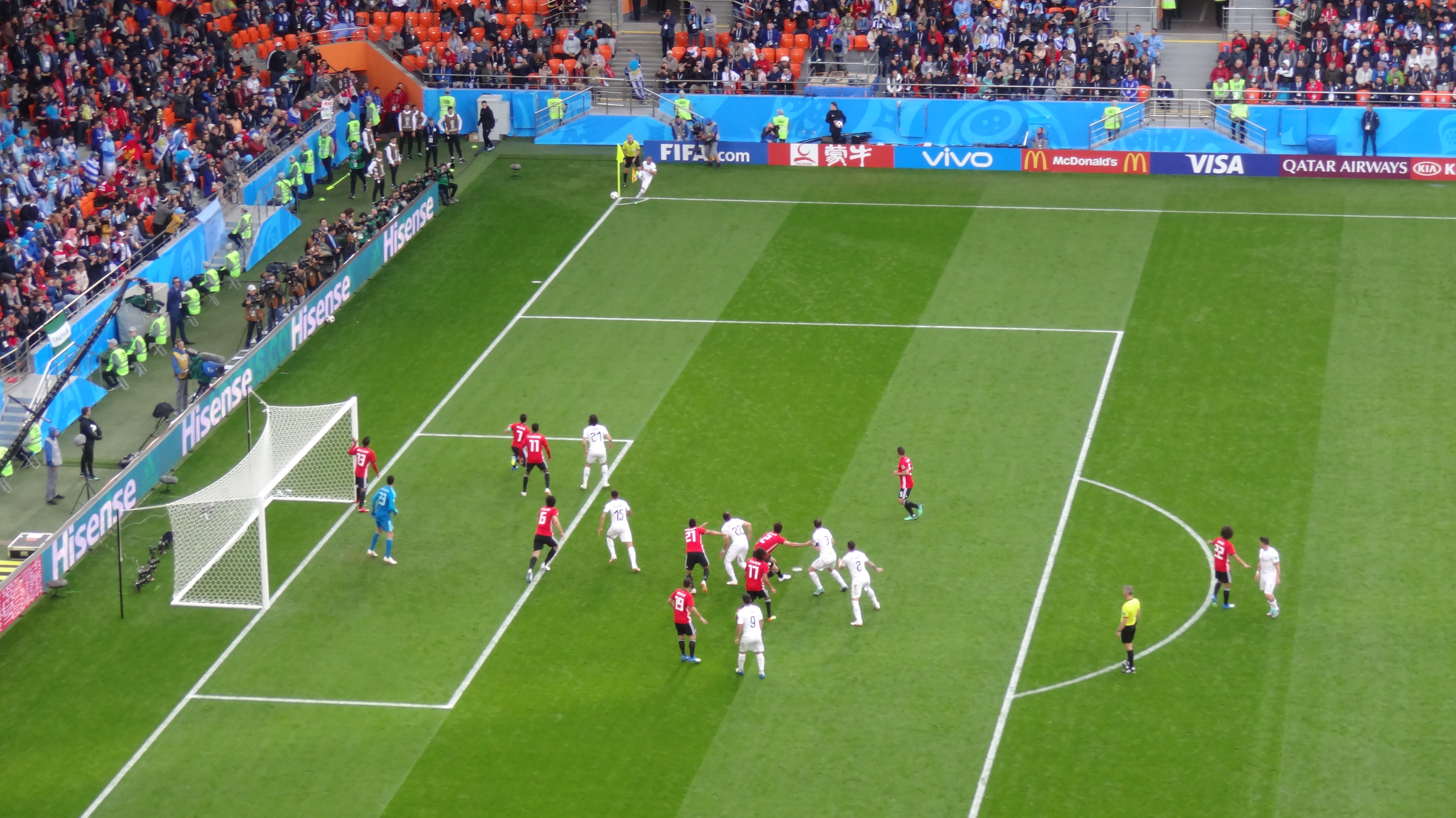
Carlos Sánchez's corner kick

The two teams had met only once, a friendly game in 2006 won by Uruguay 2–0.

Egypt frustrated Uruguay with a deep defensive line, staying compact, dealing with danger competently and threatening on the counter-attack to maintain the scoreline goalless, nearing the end of the match. Luis Suárez looked increasingly at a loss but remained prominent in the few opportunities that were created. When he had just the goalkeeper to beat, he dithered too long and allowed Mohamed El Shenawy to muffle the ball at his feet. With three minutes remaining, Edinson Cavani pulled rank over his strike partner over a free kick on the edge of the area. José Giménez headed into the net in the 89th minute as he met Carlos Sánchez's free-kick from the right to give the South Americans a winning start in Russia.

Uruguay won their opening match at the World Cup tournament for the first time since 1970, when they beat Israel 2–0.

15 June 2018
17:00 YEKT (UTC+5)

Egypt	0–1	Uruguay
		Giménez 89'

Central Stadium, Yekaterinburg
Attendance: 27,015
Referee: Björn Kuipers (Netherlands)

Egypt	Uruguay

GK	23	Mohamed El Shenawy
RB	7	Ahmed Fathy (c)
CB	2	Ali Gabr
CB	6	Ahmed Hegazi	(yellow card) 90+6'
LB	13	Mohamed Abdel Shafy
CM	8	Tarek Hamed		(substituted off) 50'
CM	17	Mohamed Elneny
RW	22	Amr Warda		(substituted off) 82'
AM	19	Abdallah Said
LW	21	Trézéguet
CF	9	Marwan Mohsen		(substituted off) 63'
Substitutions:
MF	5	Sam Morsy	(yellow card) 90+4'	(substituted on) 50'
FW	11	Kahraba		(substituted on) 63'
FW	14	Ramadan Sobhi		(substituted on) 82'
Manager:
(Argentina) Héctor Cúper

GK	1	Fernando Muslera
RB	4	Guillermo Varela
CB	2	José Giménez
CB	3	Diego Godín (c)
LB	22	Martín Cáceres
RM	8	Nahitan Nández	(substituted off) 58'
CM	15	Matías Vecino	(substituted off) 87'
CM	6	Rodrigo Bentancur
LM	10	Giorgian De Arrascaeta	(substituted off) 59'
CF	9	Luis Suárez
CF	21	Edinson Cavani
Substitutions:
MF	5	Carlos Sánchez	(substituted on) 58'
MF	7	Cristian Rodríguez	(substituted on) 59'
MF	14	Lucas Torreira	(substituted on) 87'
Manager:
(Uruguay) Óscar Tabárez

Man of the Match:
Mohamed El Shenawy (Egypt)

Assistant referees:
Sander van Roekel (Netherlands)
Erwin Zeinstra (Netherlands)
Fourth official:
Milorad Mažić (Serbia)
Reserve assistant referee:
Milovan Ristić (Serbia)
Video assistant referee:
Danny Makkelie (Netherlands)
Assistant video assistant referees:
Paweł Gil (Poland)
Cyril Gringore (France)
Clément Turpin (France)

=== Russia vs Egypt ===
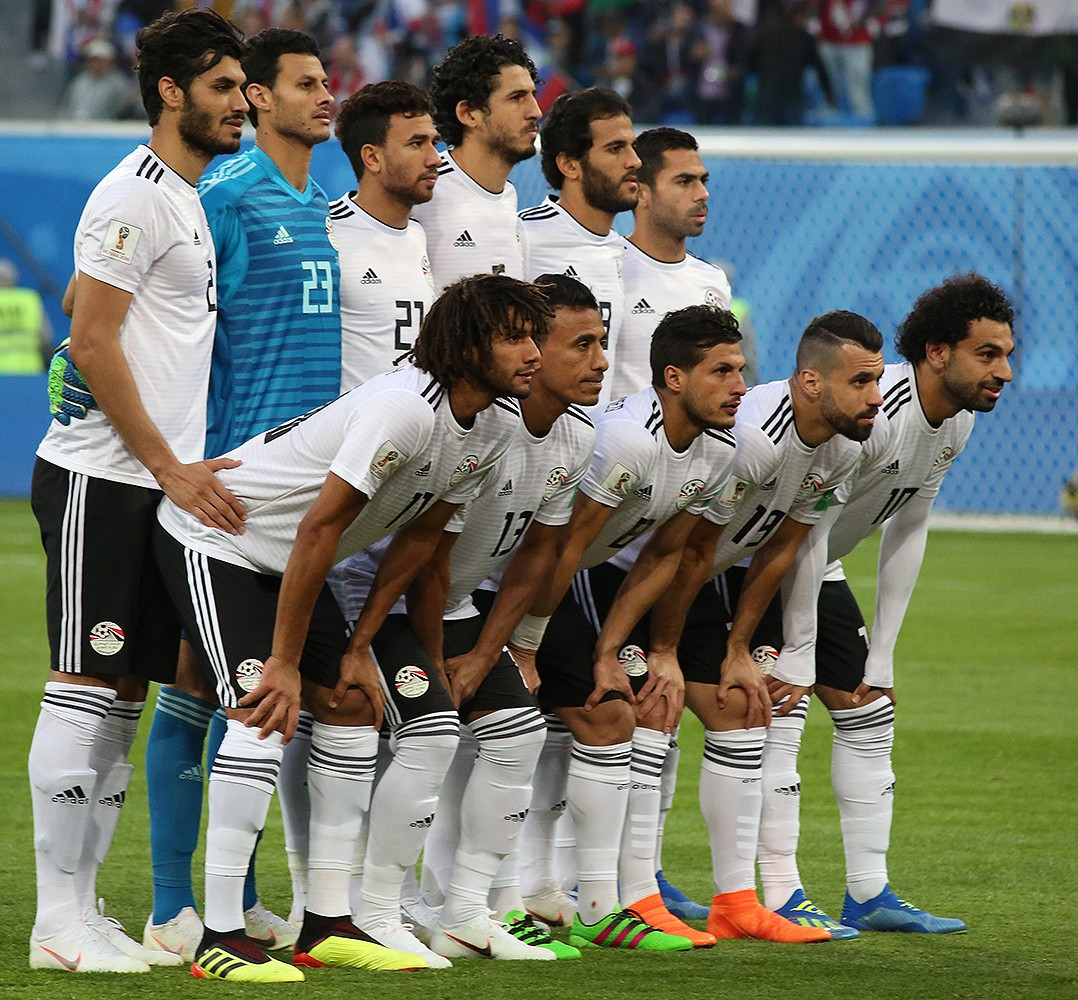
The Egyptian team lining up

The two teams had never met before.

Sergei Ignashevich headed at Mohamed El Shenawy before Aleksandr Golovin fired wide. Trézéguet then curled just wide from the edge of the box. Russia took the lead when El Shenawy's clearance punch found Roman Zobnin, whose first-time follow up shot spun in off Ahmed Fathy, with VAR confirming that Artem Dzyuba had not fouled his opponent.

Mário Fernandes soon drove into the box before supplying a cut-back form the right for Denis Cheryshev to slot home Russia's second with his left foot. Dzyuba made it 3–0 as he took a lofted ball into the box down on his chest, taking a touch to go past Ali Gabr and finish past El Shenawy with a low shot. Salah won a penalty after he was fouled by Zobnin - although it was only given after a consultation with the video assistant referee as the referee had initially said the offence took place outside the area. Salah scored from the spot to become only the third Egyptian player to score at a World Cup.

This is the first time that Russia have won their opening two matches at a World Cup since 1966 (as the Soviet Union). And following with Uruguay's 1–0 victory over Saudi Arabia, Russia, for the first time since the collapse of the Soviet Union, qualified for the next round.

19 June 2018
21:00 MSK (UTC+3)

Russia	3–1	Egypt
Fathy 47' (o.g.); Cheryshev 59'; Dzyuba 62'		Salah 73' (pen.)

Krestovsky Stadium, Saint Petersburg
Attendance: 64,468
Referee: Enrique Cáceres (Paraguay)

Russia	Egypt

GK	1	Igor Akinfeev (c)
RB	2	Mário Fernandes
CB	3	Ilya Kutepov
CB	4	Sergei Ignashevich
LB	18	Yuri Zhirkov		(substituted off) 86'
CM	11	Roman Zobnin
CM	8	Yury Gazinsky
RW	19	Aleksandr Samedov
AM	17	Aleksandr Golovin
LW	6	Denis Cheryshev		(substituted off) 74'
CF	22	Artem Dzyuba		(substituted off) 79'
Substitutions:
MF	7	Daler Kuzyayev		(substituted on) 74'
FW	10	Fyodor Smolov	(yellow card) 84'	(substituted on) 79'
DF	13	Fyodor Kudryashov		(substituted on) 86'
Manager:
(Russia) Stanislav Cherchesov

GK	23	Mohamed El Shenawy
RB	7	Ahmed Fathy (c)
CB	2	Ali Gabr
CB	6	Ahmed Hegazi
LB	13	Mohamed Abdel Shafy
CM	8	Tarek Hamed
CM	17	Mohamed Elneny		(substituted off) 64'
RW	10	Mohamed Salah
AM	19	Abdallah Said
LW	21	Trézéguet	(yellow card) 57'	(substituted off) 68'
CF	9	Marwan Mohsen		(substituted off) 82'
Substitutions:
FW	22	Amr Warda		(substituted on) 64'
FW	14	Ramadan Sobhi		(substituted on) 68'
FW	11	Kahraba		(substituted on) 82'
Manager:
(Argentina) Héctor Cúper

Man of the Match:
Denis Cheryshev (Russia)

Assistant referees:
Eduardo Cardozo (Paraguay)
Juan Zorrilla (Paraguay)
Fourth official:
Cüneyt Çakır (Turkey)
Reserve assistant referee:
Bahattin Duran (Turkey)
Video assistant referee:
Massimiliano Irrati (Italy)
Assistant video assistant referees:
Mauro Vigliano (Argentina)
Carlos Astroza (Chile)
Szymon Marciniak (Poland)

=== Uruguay vs Saudi Arabia ===
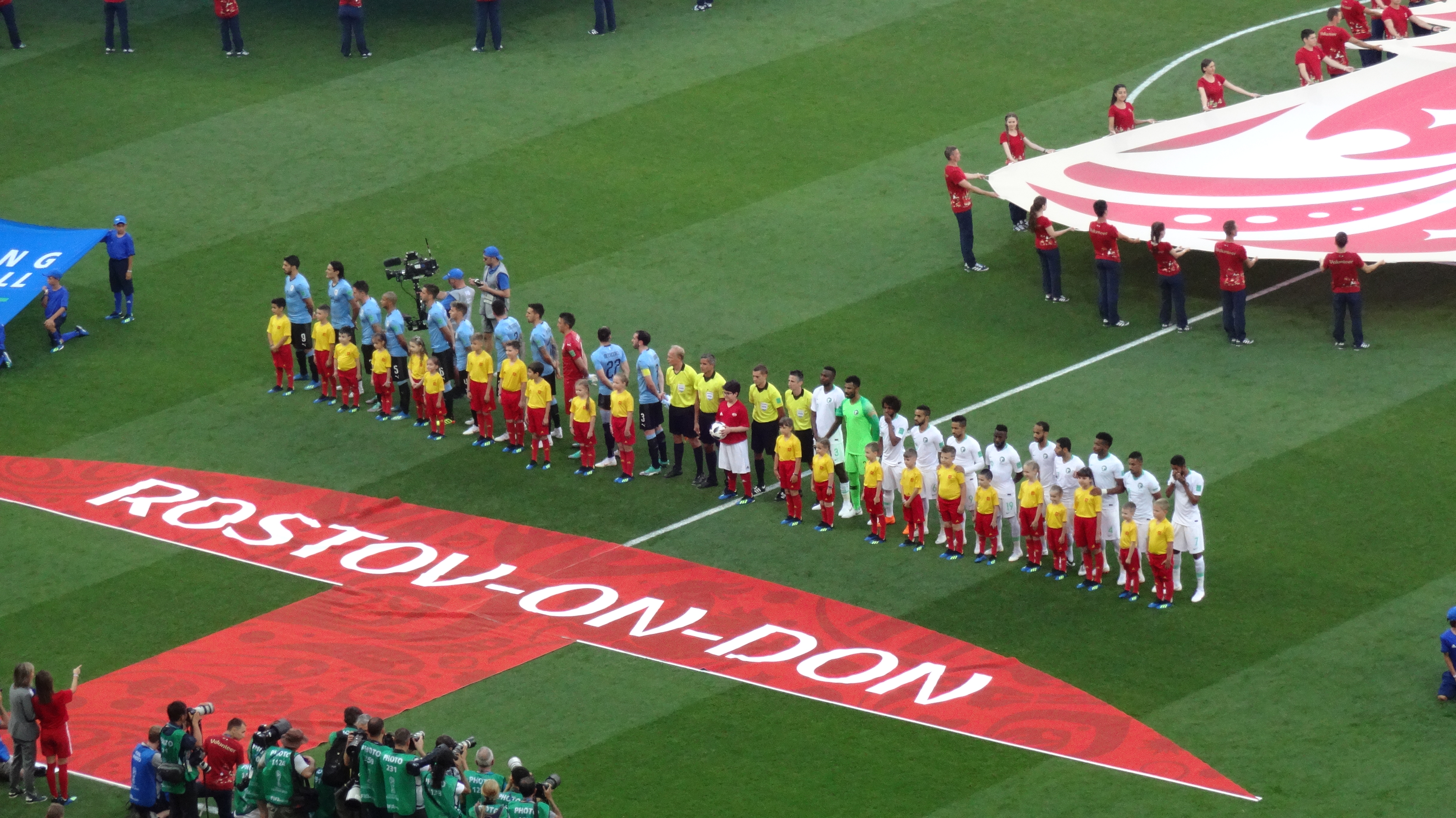
Uruguay vs Saudi Arabia

The two teams had met in two games. Their most recent meeting was a friendly in 2014, ending in a 1–1 draw.

A left-wing Carlos Sánchez corner was missed by Mohammed Al-Owais, giving Luis Suárez a close-range finish into an unguarded net with his left foot. Fernando Muslera had to tip over a long-range drive from Hattan Bahebri, who then missed a chance in the box. The flat feel of the game continued after the interval with both sides struggling to build tempo in hot conditions at the Rostov Arena. Martín Cáceres headed over in the 68th minute from a Sanchez delivery. Saudi Arabia had plenty of the ball in the closing stages but were unable to score a goal. The result ensured that both Russia and Uruguay would advance to the knockout stage, while Egypt and Saudi Arabia were eliminated at the group stage.

Uruguay have won all four of their World Cup matches against Asian opposition. Suarez became the sixth player to make 100 appearances for his country. He also became the first Uruguay player to score in three World Cups. Uruguay's victory had also helped Russia to qualify for the first time since the fall of the Soviet Union, as Russia had won 3–1 over Egypt earlier.

20 June 2018
18:00 MSK (UTC+3)

Uruguay	1–0	Saudi Arabia
Suárez 23'

Rostov Arena, Rostov-on-Don
Attendance: 42,678
Referee: Clément Turpin (France)

Uruguay	Saudi Arabia

GK	1	Fernando Muslera
RB	4	Guillermo Varela
CB	2	José Giménez
CB	3	Diego Godín (c)
LB	22	Martín Cáceres
RM	5	Carlos Sánchez	(substituted off) 82'
CM	15	Matías Vecino	(substituted off) 59'
CM	6	Rodrigo Bentancur
LM	7	Cristian Rodríguez	(substituted off) 59'
CF	9	Luis Suárez
CF	21	Edinson Cavani
Substitutions:
MF	17	Diego Laxalt	(substituted on) 59'
MF	14	Lucas Torreira	(substituted on) 59'
MF	8	Nahitan Nández	(substituted on) 82'
Manager:
(Uruguay) Óscar Tabárez

GK	22	Mohammed Al-Owais
RB	6	Mohammed Al-Breik
CB	3	Osama Hawsawi (c)
CB	4	Ali Al-Bulaihi
LB	13	Yasser Al-Shahrani
DM	14	Abdullah Otayf
CM	7	Salman Al-Faraj
CM	17	Taisir Al-Jassim	(substituted off) 44'
RW	9	Hattan Bahebri	(substituted off) 75'
LW	18	Salem Al-Dawsari
CF	19	Fahad Al-Muwallad	(substituted off) 78'
Substitutions:
MF	16	Housain Al-Mogahwi	(substituted on) 44'
MF	12	Mohamed Kanno	(substituted on) 75'
FW	10	Mohammad Al-Sahlawi	(substituted on) 78'
Manager:
(Spain) Juan Antonio Pizzi

Man of the Match:
Luis Suárez (Uruguay)

Assistant referees:
Nicolas Danos (France)
Cyril Gringore (France)
Fourth official:
John Pitti (Panama)
Reserve assistant referee:
Gabriel Victoria (Panama)
Video assistant referee:
Szymon Marciniak (Poland)
Assistant video assistant referees:
Paweł Gil (Poland)
Paweł Sokolnicki (Poland)
Daniele Orsato (Italy)

=== Uruguay vs Russia ===
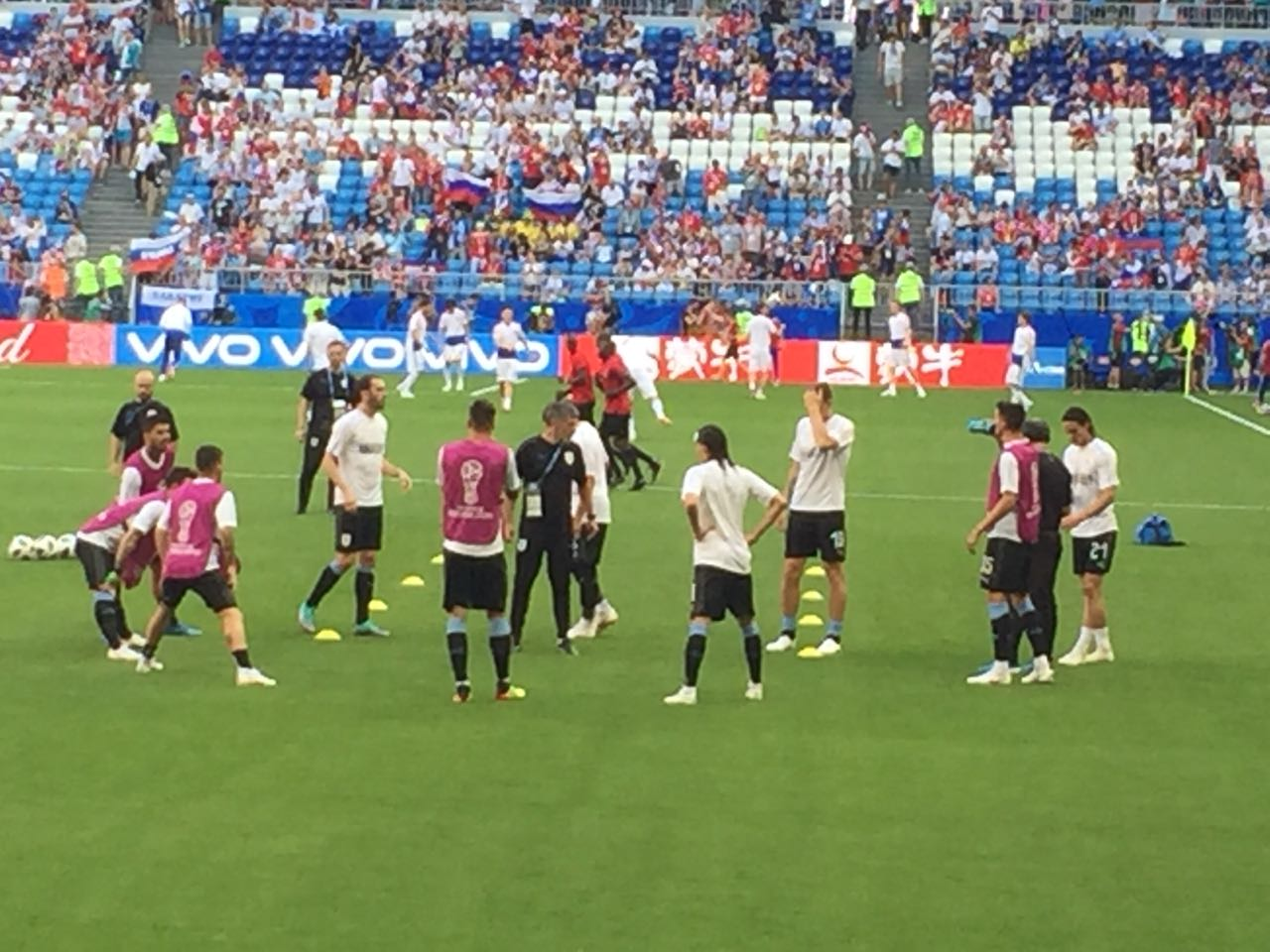
Uruguay national team warming-up

The two teams had met in one previous game, a friendly in 2012, which ended in a 1–1 draw. With Russia formerly playing as the Soviet Union, the sides had faced each other seven times, including two matches at the World Cup, one in the 1962 FIFA World Cup group stage, won by the Soviet Union 2–1, and the other one at the 1970 FIFA World Cup quarter-finals, won by Uruguay 1–0.

Luis Suárez curled a low free-kick into the bottom-right corner after Yury Gazinsky's foul on Rodrigo Bentancur. Denis Cheryshev struck a half-volley straight at Fernando Muslera. He then found the net at the other end on 23 minutes, though, as his touch diverted Diego Laxalt's first-time effort past Igor Akinfeev. In the 36th minute, Igor Smolnikov picked up his second booking after lunging in on Edinson Cavani, just eight minutes after being carded for a foul on Matías Vecino. Muslera's pass enabled Russia to counter, though Artem Dzyuba sent his close-range effort well wide. In the final minute of normal time, Cavani thumped home the rebound after Akinfeev had kept out Diego Godín's header.

Russia are the first European side to fail to top their group as the host nation since Spain in 1982, and they are equal with South Africa (2010) in suffering the heaviest defeat as hosts in the group stage – both defeated 3–0 by Uruguay. Uruguay are the first side to win all three of their group games (scoring five goals) without conceding a single goal since Argentina in 1998 (seven goals scored, none conceded). Cavani became just the second player to score a goal in three separate World Cup tournaments for Uruguay after Luis Suárez. Muslera became Uruguay's all-time leading appearance maker at the World Cup (14), overtaking fellow goalkeeper Ladislao Mazurkiewicz. This was also the third time that Uruguay defeated the host nation of tournament, after Brazil in 1950 and South Africa in 2010 (this last also in the group stage).

25 June 2018
18:00 SAMT (UTC+4)

Uruguay	3–0	Russia
Suárez 10'; Cheryshev 23' (o.g.); Cavani 90'

Cosmos Arena, Samara
Attendance: 41,970
Referee: Malang Diedhiou (Senegal)

Uruguay	Russia

GK	1	Fernando Muslera
CB	19	Sebastián Coates
CB	3	Diego Godín (c)
CB	22	Martín Cáceres
DM	14	Lucas Torreira
CM	15	Matías Vecino
CM	6	Rodrigo Bentancur	(yellow card) 59'	(substituted off) 63'
RW	8	Nahitan Nández		(substituted off) 73'
LW	17	Diego Laxalt
CF	9	Luis Suárez
CF	21	Edinson Cavani		(substituted off) 90+3'
Substitutions:
MF	10	Giorgian De Arrascaeta		(substituted on) 63'
MF	7	Cristian Rodríguez		(substituted on) 73'
FW	18	Maxi Gómez		(substituted on) 90+3'
Manager:
(Uruguay) Óscar Tabárez

GK	1	Igor Akinfeev (c)
RB	23	Igor Smolnikov	(yellow card) 27' (yellow-red card) 36'
CB	3	Ilya Kutepov
CB	4	Sergei Ignashevich
LB	13	Fyodor Kudryashov
CM	11	Roman Zobnin
CM	8	Yury Gazinsky	(yellow card) 9'	(substituted off) 46'
RW	19	Aleksandr Samedov
AM	15	Aleksei Miranchuk		(substituted off) 60'
LW	6	Denis Cheryshev		(substituted off) 38'
CF	22	Artem Dzyuba
Substitutions:
DF	2	Mário Fernandes		(substituted on) 38'
MF	7	Daler Kuzyayev		(substituted on) 46'
FW	10	Fyodor Smolov		(substituted on) 60'
Manager:
(Russia) Stanislav Cherchesov

Man of the Match:
Luis Suárez (Uruguay)

Assistant referees:
Djibril Camara (Senegal)
El Hadji Samba (Senegal)
Fourth official:
Bamlak Tessema Weyesa (Ethiopia)
Reserve assistant referee:
Hasan Al Mahri (United Arab Emirates)
Video assistant referee:
Clément Turpin (France)
Assistant video assistant referees:
Paweł Gil (Poland)
Cyril Gringore (France)
Daniele Orsato (Italy)

=== Saudi Arabia vs Egypt ===
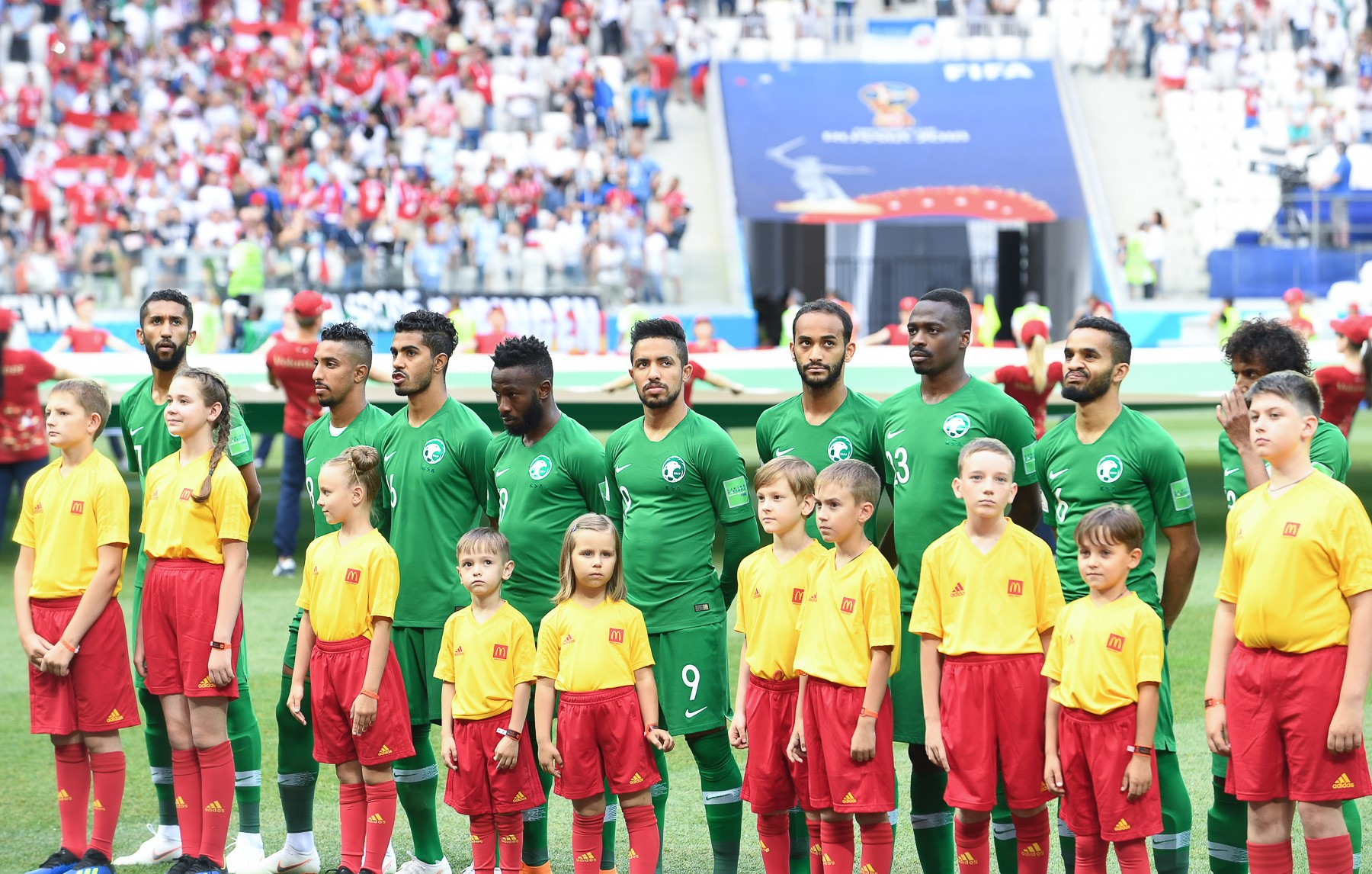
Saudi Arabia

The two teams had met in six previous matches, the most recent one in the 2007 Pan Arab Games, won by Egypt 2–1.

Mohamed Salah took Abdallah Said's long ball in his stride and then sent a deft lob over the onrushing Yasser Al-Mosailem with his second touch in the 22nd minute. Salah broke Saudi Arabia's offside trap and clipped an effort wide of the right-hand post. Five minutes before the interval Ahmed Fathy was adjudged to have deliberately handled Yasser Al-Shahrani's cross inside the area. Essam El Hadary produced a save to deny Fahad Al-Muwallad, but his celebrations were cut short when a second penalty was awarded for Ali Gabr's tug on Al-Muwallad's shirt. Salman Al-Faraj stepped up this time to fire past the goalkeeper and draw his side level. Egypt substitute Kahraba fired straight at Al-Mosailem late on. Salem Al-Dawsari finished a right-footed volley past El Hadary in the closing stages.

This match was the first time Egypt have ever led in a World Cup match, in what was their seventh match in the competition. Al-Faraj's penalty goal for Saudi Arabia, scored after 50 minutes and 36 seconds, was the latest goal scored in the first half of a World Cup game since 1966. El Hadary, at the age of 45 years and 161 days, is the oldest player in the history of the World Cup, breaking the record set by Colombia's Faryd Mondragón in 2014 (43y 3d). Salah became the first African player to score in his first two appearances at the World Cup. Abdullah Otayf completed 110 passes in this match, the most by an Asian player in a World Cup match since 1966. Saudi Arabia remains undefeated when it comes against their Arab rivals in the World Cup, having beaten Morocco 2–1 in 1994 and drew 2–2 to Tunisia in 2006. It was Saudi Arabia's first World Cup win since 1994.

25 June 2018
17:00 MSK (UTC+3)

Saudi Arabia	2–1	Egypt
Al-Faraj 45+6' (pen.); Al-Dawsari 90+5'		Salah 22'

Volgograd Arena, Volgograd
Attendance: 36,823
Referee: Wilmar Roldán (Colombia)

Saudi Arabia	Egypt

GK	21	Yasser Al-Mosailem
RB	6	Mohammed Al-Breik
CB	3	Osama Hawsawi (c)
CB	23	Motaz Hawsawi
LB	13	Yasser Al-Shahrani
DM	14	Abdullah Otayf
CM	7	Salman Al-Faraj
CM	16	Housain Al-Mogahwi
RW	9	Hattan Bahebri	(substituted off) 65'
LW	18	Salem Al-Dawsari
CF	19	Fahad Al-Muwallad	(substituted off) 79'
Substitutions:
FW	20	Muhannad Assiri	(substituted on) 65'
MF	8	Yahya Al-Shehri	(substituted on) 79'
Manager:
(Spain) Juan Antonio Pizzi

GK	1	Essam El Hadary (c)
RB	7	Ahmed Fathy	(yellow card) 86'
CB	2	Ali Gabr	(yellow card) 45+5'
CB	6	Ahmed Hegazi
LB	13	Mohamed Abdel Shafy
CM	17	Mohamed Elneny
CM	8	Tarek Hamed
RW	10	Mohamed Salah
AM	19	Abdallah Said		(substituted off) 45+7'
LW	21	Trézéguet		(substituted off) 81'
CF	9	Marwan Mohsen		(substituted off) 64'
Substitutions:
FW	22	Amr Warda		(substituted on) 45+7'
FW	14	Ramadan Sobhi		(substituted on) 64'
FW	11	Kahraba		(substituted on) 81'
Manager:
(Argentina) Héctor Cúper

Man of the Match:
Mohamed Salah (Egypt)

Assistant referees:
Alexander Guzmán (Colombia)
Cristian de la Cruz (Colombia)
Fourth official:
Ricardo Montero (Costa Rica)
Reserve assistant referee:
Hiroshi Yamauchi (Japan)
Video assistant referee:
Artur Soares Dias (Portugal)
Assistant video assistant referees:
Tiago Martins (Portugal)
Carlos Astroza (Chile)
Wilton Sampaio (Brazil)

== Discipline ==
Fair play points would have been used as tiebreakers if the overall and head-to-head records of teams were tied. These were calculated based on yellow and red cards received in all group matches as follows:

- first yellow card: minus 1 point;
- indirect red card (second yellow card): minus 3 points;
- direct red card: minus 4 points;
- yellow card and direct red card: minus 5 points;

Only one of the above deductions were applied to a player in a single match.

Team	Match 1				Match 2				Match 3				Points
Team	Booked	(yellow card) (yellow-red card)	Sent off (straight red)	(yellow card) (red card)	Booked	(yellow card) (yellow-red card)	Sent off (straight red)	(yellow card) (red card)	Booked	(yellow card) (yellow-red card)	Sent off (straight red)	(yellow card) (red card)	Points
Uruguay									1				−1
Saudi Arabia	1												−1
Egypt	2				1				2				−5
Russia	1				1				1	1			−6

== See also ==
- Egypt at the FIFA World Cup
- Russia at the FIFA World Cup
- Saudi Arabia at the FIFA World Cup
- Uruguay at the FIFA World Cup
