= Yury Gazinsky =

Russian footballer (born 1989)

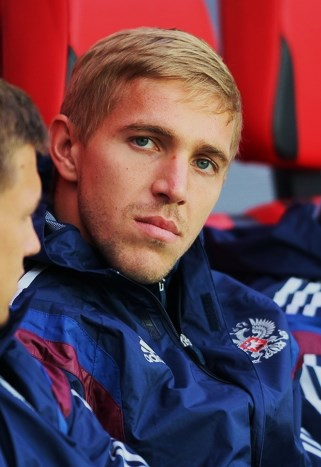
- Gazinsky in 2014

Personal information
- Full name: Yury Aleksandrovich Gazinsky
- Date of birth: 20 July 1989 (age 37)
- Place of birth: Komsomolsk-on-Amur, Russian SFSR, Soviet Union
- Height: 1.84 m (6 ft 0 in)
- Position: Midfielder

Youth career
- 2003–2007: Smena Komsomolsk-na-Amure

Senior career*
Years	Team	Apps	(Gls)
2007–2010	Smena Komsomolsk-na-Amure	70	(10)
2010–2012	Luch-Energiya	51	(2)
2012–2013	Torpedo Moscow	29	(3)
2013–2022	Krasnodar	209	(11)
2022–2024	Ural Yekaterinburg	21	(3)
2024–2025	Krasnodar	3	(1)
2024	Krasnodar-2	2	(0)
Total		385	(30)

International career
2014–2020	Russia	21	(1)
- * Club domestic league appearances and goals

Yury Aleksandrovich Gazinsky (Russian: Юрий Александрович Газинский, IPA: [ˈjʉrʲɪj ɐlʲɪˈksandrəvʲɪtɕ gɐˈzʲinskʲɪj]; born 20 July 1989) is a Russian former professional footballer who played as a defensive midfielder.

== Club career ==
In May 2013, Gazinsky signed for Krasnodar on a three-year contract. He left Krasnodar as his contract expired in May 2022.

On 17 August 2022, Gazinsky signed a two-year contract with Ural Yekaterinburg. Gazinsky left Ural as his contract expired in June 2024.

On 10 July 2024, Gazinsky returned to Krasnodar on a one-season contract. After winning his first Russian Premier League title, which was also the club's first, Gazinsky left Krasnodar on 27 May 2025. On 23 August 2025, Gazinsky announced his retirement from playing.

== International career ==
He was called up to the Russia national football team in August 2015 for the UEFA Euro 2016 qualifiers against Sweden and against Liechtenstein. He made his debut for the team on 31 August 2016 in a friendly against Turkey.

On 11 May 2018, he was included in Russia's extended 2018 FIFA World Cup squad. On 3 June 2018, he was included in the finalized World Cup squad. On 14 June 2018, he scored the first goal of the 2018 FIFA World Cup in the 12th minute of the opening match against Saudi Arabia. Russia went on to win the match 5–0. He stayed on the bench in the Round of 16 defeat of Spain before appearing as a substitute in the quarterfinal shoot-out loss to Croatia.

On 11 May 2021, he was named as a back-up player for Russia's UEFA Euro 2020 squad.

== Career statistics ==
=== Club ===
As of match played 19 April 2025

Club	Season	League			Cup		Europe		Other		Total	
Club	Season	Division	Apps	Goals	Apps	Goals	Apps	Goals	Apps	Goals	Apps	Goals
Smena Komsomolsk-na-Amure	2007	Russian Second League	5	0	0	0	—		—		5	0
Smena Komsomolsk-na-Amure	2008	Russian Second League	24	3	4	0	—		—		28	3
Smena Komsomolsk-na-Amure	2009	Russian Second League	23	5	0	0	—		—		23	5
Smena Komsomolsk-na-Amure	2010	Russian Second League	18	2	1	0	—		—		19	2
Smena Komsomolsk-na-Amure	Total		70	10	5	0	—		—		75	10
Luch-Energia Vladivostok	2010	Russian First League	14	1	0	0	—		—		14	1
Luch-Energia Vladivostok	2011–12	Russian First League	37	1	3	0	—		—		40	1
Luch-Energia Vladivostok	Total		51	2	3	0	—		—		54	2
Torpedo Moscow	2012–13	Russian First League	29	3	2	0	—		—		31	3
Krasnodar	2013–14	Russian Premier League	29	1	4	0	—		—		33	1
Krasnodar	2014–15	Russian Premier League	21	0	2	0	11	1	—		34	1
Krasnodar	2015–16	Russian Premier League	21	0	3	0	10	1	—		34	1
Krasnodar	2016–17	Russian Premier League	29	2	3	0	12	0	—		44	2
Krasnodar	2017–18	Russian Premier League	28	2	0	0	3	0	0	0	31	2
Krasnodar	2018–19	Russian Premier League	28	2	4	0	9	1	0	0	41	3
Krasnodar	2019–20	Russian Premier League	11	0	0	0	2	0	0	0	13	0
Krasnodar	2020–21	Russian Premier League	26	3	1	0	8	0	0	0	35	3
Krasnodar	2021–22	Russian Premier League	16	1	1	0	—		—		17	1
Krasnodar	Total		209	11	18	0	55	3	0	0	282	14
Ural Yekaterinburg	2022–23	Russian Premier League	14	3	6	2	—		—		20	5
Ural Yekaterinburg	2023–24	Russian Premier League	7	0	1	0	—		—		8	0
Ural Yekaterinburg	Total		21	3	7	2	—		—		28	5
Krasnodar	2024–25	Russian Premier League	3	1	4	0	—		—		7	1
Krasnodar-2	2024–25	Russian Second League	2	0	—		—		—		2	0
Career total			385	30	39	2	55	3	0	0	479	35

=== International ===
As of 14 October 2020

Russia
Year	Apps	Goals
2016	4	0
2017	1	0
2018	11	1
2019	1	0
2020	4	0
Total	21	1

=== International goals ===
Scores and results list Russia's goal tally first.

No.	Date	Venue	Opponent	Score	Result	Competition
1.	14 June 2018	Luzhniki Stadium, Moscow, Russia	Saudi Arabia	1–0	5–0	2018 FIFA World Cup

== Honours ==
Krasnodar

- Russian Premier League: 2024–25

=== Individual ===
- Russian Premier League Defensive Midfielder of the Season: 2018–19

Sporting positions
Preceded by Marcelo (own goal)	FIFA World Cup opening goal 2018	Succeeded by Enner Valencia
