= Mauricio Espinosa =

Uruguayan football referee

Mauricio Espinosa Rodríguez (born 6 May 1972) was a Uruguayan football referee who participated in the 2010 FIFA World Cup. He gained publicity during the Round of 16 match between Germany and England, when he ruled that England midfielder Frank Lampard's strike did not cross the goal line, although television coverage clearly indicated the opposite.

== Personal ==
Mauricio Espinosa was born on 6 May 1972 and lives in the Uruguayan capital Montevideo. He is also a science teacher, he speaks English and Spanish. Espinosa has been refereeing international matches since 2006.

== 2010 FIFA World Cup ==
Espinosa was an assistant referee in the following 2010 FIFA World Cup matches:

- Group D: Australia vs Serbia
- Group E: Cameroon vs Denmark
- Group G: Côte d'Ivoire vs Portugal
- Round of 16: Germany vs England

In each of these matches, the main referee was Jorge Larrionda, who is also from Uruguay.

=== Germany vs. England controversy ===
The Germany vs. England Round of 16 match, which ended 4-1 and where Espinosa was an assistant referee, resulted in controversial decisions and massive media attention. The main referee of the match was Jorge Larrionda.

Early in the game, Espinosa ruled that Wayne Rooney was offside, when in reality Rooney picked up an erroneous pass from a German player, and therefore could not have been offside according to the rules. Espinosa's most controversial decision occurred in the 38th minute, when Germany was leading 2-1, as England's Frank Lampard shot hit the crossbar, bounced over the goal line and back out of the goal. Television pictures and video replay showed that the ball clearly crossed the line, but both Espinosa and Larrionda failed to spot this, despite appearing to have a good view of where the ball had landed. In the referees' dressing room during the half-time interval, Larrionda and Espinosa were shown the TV coverage of the incident. After noticing his mistake, Espinosa was said to have exclaimed "Oh my God!". The incident led to large-scale protests from players, coaches and officials alike, as well as increased demands for FIFA to introduce goal-line video technology in matches.

Espinosa and Larrionda were among referees dropped by FIFA after the Round of 16. They did not participate in any further matches in the 2010 World Cup.

== 2018 FIFA World Cup ==
In March 2018, FIFA announced that he will officiate some matches at side of Andres Cunha and Nicolas Taran as assistant referee at 2018 FIFA World Cup. On 10 July 2018, He officiated the semifinal between France and Belgium.
