= Andrés Cunha =

Uruguayan football referee

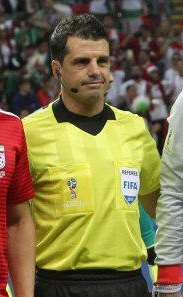
- Cunha at Kazan in 2018
- Full name: Andrés Ismael Cunha Soca
- Born: 8 September 1976 (age 50); Montevideo, Uruguay

Domestic
Years	League	Role
2010–present	Uruguayan Primera División	Referee

International
Years	League	Role
2013–present	FIFA listed	Referee

Andrés Ismael Cunha Soca (born 8 September 1976) is an international football referee from Montevideo, Uruguay.

== Career ==
He has been a FIFA-listed referee since 2013 and has refereed a number of major matches in Copa Libertadores and Copa América. Cunha has also refereed matches in the 2017 FIFA U-20 World Cup in the Korea Republic. During international matches, his assistant referees are Nicolás Taran and Mauricio Espinosa. At the domestic level, Cunha regularly referees matches in the Uruguayan Primera División.

Cunha officiated the 2018 FIFA World Cup match between France and Australia on 16 June, where he awarded a penalty kick after consultation with Mauro Vigliano, the video assistant referee. The incident marked the first time a penalty had been awarded after consultation with the VAR in a World Cup match.

== FIFA World Cup ==
2018 FIFA World Cup – Russia
Date	Match	Venue	Round
16 June 2018	France – Australia	Kazan	Group stage
20 June 2018	Iran – Spain	Kazan	Group stage
10 July 2018	France – Belgium	Saint Petersburg	Semi-final
