= Mauro Vigliano =

Argentine professional football referee (born 1975)

- Born: 5 August 1975 (age 51); La Plata, Argentina

Domestic
Years	League	Role

International
Years	League	Role
2013–	FIFA listed	Referee

Mauro Vigliano (born 5 August 1975) is an Argentine professional football referee. He has been a full international for FIFA since 2013. He refereed some matches in Copa Libertadores and a game between Ecuador and Peru in the 2018 Russia World Cup Qualifiers.

Vigliano was the video assistant referee for the 2018 FIFA World Cup match between France and Australia on 16 June. Andrés Cunha, the head referee, used the VAR system to award a penalty kick, which was scored by Antoine Griezmann. The incident marked the first time a penalty had been awarded after consultation with a VAR in a World Cup match.
