= Uruguay at the 1928 Summer Olympics =

- IOC code: URU
- NOC: Uruguayan Olympic Committee

in Amsterdam
- Competitors: 22 in 1 sport
- Medals Ranked 24th: Gold 1 Silver 0 Bronze 0 Total 1

Summer Olympics appearances (overview)
- 1924; 1928; 1932; 1936; 1948; 1952; 1956; 1960; 1964; 1968; 1972; 1976; 1980; 1984; 1988; 1992; 1996; 2000; 2004; 2008; 2012; 2016; 2020; 2024

Uruguay competed at the 1928 Summer Olympics in Amsterdam, Netherlands.

== Medalists ==
Medal	Name	Sport	Event	Date
Gold	Uruguay national football team: José Andrade; Peregrino Anselmo; Pedro Arispe; Juan Arremón; Venancio Bartibás; Fausto Batignani; René Borjas; Antonio Campolo; Adhemar Canavesi; Héctor Castro; Pedro Cea; Lorenzo Fernández; Roberto Figueroa; Álvaro Gestido; Andrés Mazali; Ángel Melogno; José Nasazzi; Pedro Petrone; Juan Píriz; Héctor Scarone; Domingo Tejera; Santos Urdinarán	Football		June 13

== Results by event ==
=== Football ===
30 May 1928 Round of 16	Netherlands	0–2	Uruguay	Amsterdam
19:00		Report	Scarone 20'; Urdinarán 86'	Stadium: Olympic Stadium; Attendance: 27,730; Referee: John Langenus (Belgium)

3 June 1928 Quarterfinals	Germany	1–4	Uruguay	Amsterdam
16:00	Kalb (red card) 37'; Hofmann 81' (red card) 87'	Report	Petrone 35', 39', 84'; Castro 63'; Nasazzi (red card) 87'	Stadium: Olympic Stadium; Attendance: 25,131; Referee: Youssuf Mohamed (Egypt)

7 June 1928 Semifinals	Italy	2–3	Uruguay	Amsterdam
19:00	Baloncieri 9'; Levratto 60'	Report	Cea 17'; Campolo 28'; Scarone 31'	Stadium: Olympic Stadium; Attendance: 15,230; Referee: Willem Eijmers (Netherlands)

10 June 1928 Gold medal match	Uruguay	1–1 (a.e.t.)	Argentina	Amsterdam
16:00	Petrone 23'	Report	Ferreira 50'	Stadium: Olympic Stadium; Attendance: 28,253; Referee: Johannes Mutters (Netherlands)

13 June 1928 Gold medal match (Replay)	Uruguay	2–1	Argentina	Amsterdam
19:00	Figueroa 17'; Scarone 73'	Report	Monti 28'	Stadium: Olympic Stadium; Attendance: 28,113; Referee: Johannes Mutters (Netherlands)

Squad

- José Andrade
- Juan Peregrino Anselmo
- Pedro Arispe
- Juan Arremón
- Venancio Bartibás
- Fausto Batignani
- René Borjas
- Antonio Campolo
- Adhemar Canavesi
- Héctor Castro
- Pedro Cea
- Lorenzo Fernández
- Roberto Figueroa
- Álvaro Gestido
- Andrés Mazali
- Ángel Melogno
- José Nasazzi
- Pedro Petrone
- Juan Piriz
- Héctor Scarone
- Domingo Tejera
- Santos Urdinarán
