= Uruguay at the Copa América =

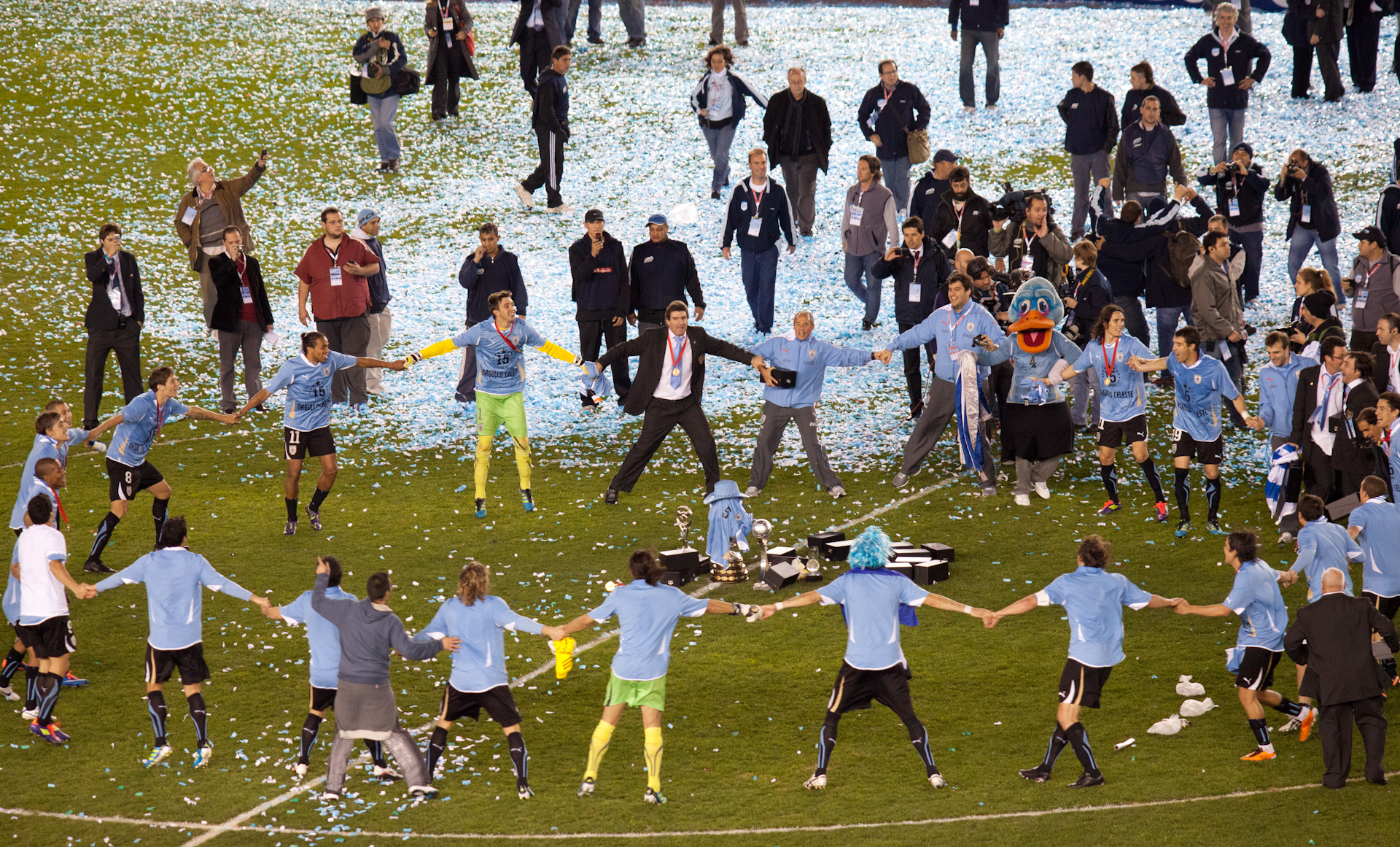
Uruguayan players celebrating the 3–0 victory against Paraguay in the 2011 Copa América final.

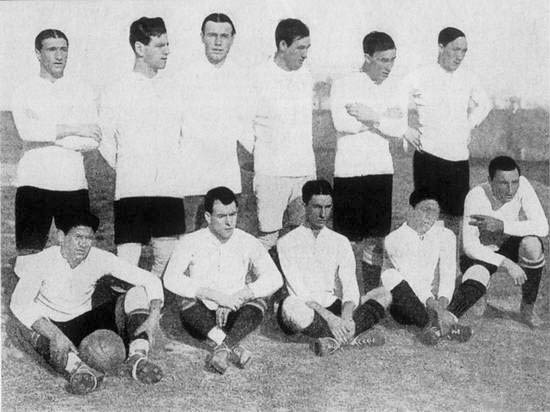
The Uruguayan squad that won the inaugural South American Championship in 1916.

The Copa América is South America's major tournament in senior men's football and determines the continental champion. Until 1967, the tournament was known as South American Championship. It is the oldest continental championship in the world with its first edition held in 1916.

Uruguay won the inaugural tournament in Argentina, making them the first nation to hold an international football title worldwide. They are the second-most successful team in tournament history with fifteen titles, behind rivals Argentina by one.

Until 1927, the South American Championship was held annually, and Uruguay were the dominating team during this early era, winning six out of eleven tournaments. Part of all six victorious squads was inside-forward Ángel Romano, who holds the record for most titles and for most tournament participations (9).

== Overall record ==
South American Championship / Copa América record
Year	Round	Position	Pld	W	D*	L	GF	GA	Squad
(Argentina) 1916	Champions	1st	3	2	1	0	6	1	Squad
(Uruguay) 1917	Champions	1st	3	3	0	0	9	0	Squad
(Brazil) 1919	Runners-up	2nd	4	2	1	1	7	5	Squad
(Chile) 1920	Champions	1st	3	2	1	0	9	2	Squad
(Argentina) 1921	Third place	3rd	3	1	0	2	3	4	Squad
(Brazil) 1922	Third place	3rd	4	2	1	1	3	1	Squad
(Uruguay) 1923	Champions	1st	3	3	0	0	6	1	Squad
(Uruguay) 1924	Champions	1st	3	2	1	0	8	1	Squad
(Argentina) 1925	Withdrew								
(Chile) 1926	Champions	1st	4	4	0	0	17	2	Squad
(Peru) 1927	Runners-up	2nd	3	2	0	1	15	3	Squad
(Argentina) 1929	Third place	3rd	3	1	0	2	4	6	Squad
(Peru) 1935	Champions	1st	3	3	0	0	6	1	Squad
(Argentina) 1937	Third place	3rd	5	2	0	3	11	14	Squad
(Peru) 1939	Runners-up	2nd	4	3	0	1	13	5	Squad
(Chile) 1941	Runners-up	2nd	4	3	0	1	10	1	Squad
(Uruguay) 1942	Champions	1st	6	6	0	0	21	2	Squad
(Chile) 1945	Fourth place	4th	6	3	0	3	14	6	Squad
(Argentina) 1946	Fourth place	4th	5	2	0	3	11	9	Squad
(Ecuador) 1947	Third place	3rd	7	5	0	2	21	8	Squad
(Brazil) 1949	Sixth place	6th	7	2	1	4	14	20	Squad
(Peru) 1953	Third place	3rd	6	3	1	2	15	6	Squad
(Chile) 1955	Fourth place	4th	5	2	1	2	12	12	Squad
(Uruguay) 1956	Champions	1st	5	4	1	0	9	3	Squad
(Peru) 1957	Third place	3rd	6	4	0	2	15	12	Squad
(Argentina) 1959	Sixth place	6th	6	2	0	4	15	14	Squad
(Ecuador) 1959	Champions	1st	4	3	1	0	13	1	Squad
(Bolivia) 1963	Withdrew								
(Uruguay) 1967	Champions	1st	5	4	1	0	13	2	Squad
1975	Semifinals	3rd	2	1	0	1	1	3	Squad
1979	Group stage	6th	4	1	2	1	5	5	Squad
1983	Champions	1st	8	5	2	1	12	6	Squad
(Argentina) 1987	Champions	1st	2	2	0	0	2	0	Squad
(Brazil) 1989	Runners-up	2nd	7	4	0	3	11	3	Squad
(Chile) 1991	Group stage	5th	4	1	3	0	4	3	Squad
(Ecuador) 1993	Quarter-finals	6th	4	1	2	1	5	5	Squad
(Uruguay) 1995	Champions	1st	6	4	2	0	11	4	Squad
(Bolivia) 1997	Group stage	9th	3	1	0	2	2	2	Squad
(Paraguay) 1999	Runners-up	2nd	6	1	2	3	4	9	Squad
(Colombia) 2001	Fourth place	4th	6	2	2	2	7	7	Squad
(Peru) 2004	Third place	3rd	6	3	2	1	12	10	Squad
(Venezuela) 2007	Fourth place	4th	6	2	2	2	8	9	Squad
(Argentina) 2011	Champions	1st	6	3	3	0	9	3	Squad
(Chile) 2015	Quarter-finals	7th	4	1	1	2	2	3	Squad
(United States) 2016	Group stage	11th	3	1	0	2	4	4	Squad
(Brazil) 2019	Quarter-finals	6th	4	2	2	0	7	2	Squad
(Brazil) 2021	Quarter-finals	5th	5	2	2	1	4	2	Squad
(United States) 2024	Third place	3rd	6	3	2	1	11	4	Squad
Total	15 Titles	46/48	212	115	40	57	421	226	—

== Decisive matches and finals ==
In the era of the South American Championship, Round Robins were more commonly played than knock-out tournaments. Listed are the decisive matches which secured Uruguay the respective titles.

Year	Match type	Opponent	Result	Manager	Uruguay scorers	Final location
(Argentina) 1916	Round Robin	Argentina	0–0	(Uruguay) Alfredo Foglino		Avellaneda
(Uruguay) 1917	Round Robin	Argentina	1–0	(Uruguay) Ramón Platero	H. Scarone	Montevideo
(Chile) 1920	Round Robin	Chile	2–1	(Uruguay) Ernesto Fígoli	Á. Romano, J. Pérez	Vina del Mar
(Uruguay) 1923	Round Robin	Argentina	2–0	(Uruguay) Leonardo De Lucca	P. Petrone, P. Somma	Montevideo
(Uruguay) 1924	Round Robin	Argentina	0–0	(Uruguay) Ernesto Meliante		Montevideo
(Chile) 1926	Round Robin	Paraguay	6–1	(Uruguay) Ernesto Fígoli	H. Castro (4), Z. Saldombide (2)	Santiago
(Peru) 1935	Round Robin	Argentina	3–0	(Uruguay) Raúl Blanco	H. Castro, J. Taboada, A. Ciocca	Lima
(Uruguay) 1942	Round Robin	Argentina	1–0	(Uruguay) Pedro Cea	B. Zapirain	Montevideo
(Uruguay) 1956	Round Robin	Argentina	1–0	(Uruguay) Hugo Magnulo	J. Ambrois	Montevideo
(Ecuador) 1959	Round Robin	Argentina–Brazil	4–1	(Uruguay) Juan Carlos Corazzo		Guayaquil
(Uruguay) 1967	Round Robin	Argentina	1–0	(Uruguay) Juan Carlos Corazzo	P. Rocha	Montevideo
1983	Final, Second Leg	Brazil	1–1	(Uruguay) Omar Borrás	C. Aguilera	Salvador da Bahia
(Argentina) 1987	Final	Chile	1–0	(Uruguay) Roberto Fleitas	P. Bengoechea	Buenos Aires
(Uruguay) 1995	Final	Brazil	1–1 (5–3 p)	(Uruguay) Héctor Núñez	P. Bengoechea	Montevideo
(Argentina) 2011	Final	Paraguay	3–0	(Uruguay) Óscar Tabárez	L. Suárez, D. Forlán (2)	Buenos Aires

== Record by opponent ==
Copa América matches (by team)
Opponent	W	D	L	Pld	GF	GA
Argentina	13	4	15	32	36	43
Bolivia	14	1	2	17	55	6
Brazil	9	9	9	27	40	37
Canada	0	1	0	1	2	2
Chile	19	5	7	31	63	29
Colombia	6	3	4	13	18	10
Costa Rica	1	1	0	2	3	2
Ecuador	14	1	3	18	66	11
Honduras	0	1	1	2	2	3
Jamaica	2	0	0	2	4	0
Japan	0	1	0	1	2	2
Mexico	1	2	3	6	7	11
Panama	1	0	0	1	3	1
Paraguay	15	6	6	27	55	33
Peru	12	3	6	21	42	25
United States	2	0	0	2	2	0
Venezuela	6	2	1	9	21	6
Total	115	40	57	212	421	226

== Record players ==
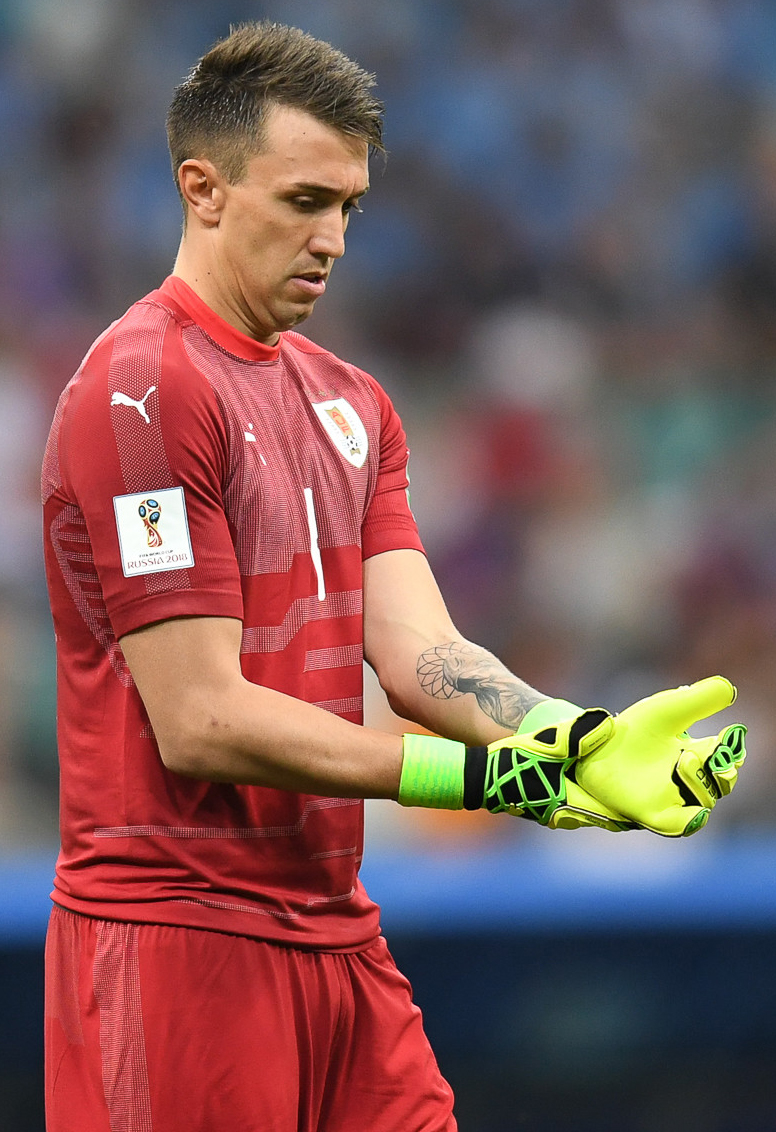
Fernando Muslera is Uruguay's all-time record appearance holder at the Copa América.

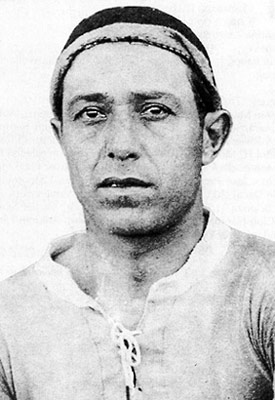
Ángel Romano is a six-time South American champion and Uruguay's record participant in number of tournaments. In addition, he scored twelve goals during that time, ranking him third in Uruguay's top scorer list at continental championships.

Rank	Player	Matches	Tournaments
1	Fernando Muslera	22	2011, 2015, 2016, 2019 and 2021
2	Ángel Romano	21	1916, 1917, 1919, 1920, 1921, 1922, 1924 and 1926
2	Schubert Gambetta	21	1941, 1942, 1945 and 1947
2	José Giménez	21	2015, 2016, 2019, 2021 and 2024
5	Roberto Porta	20	1939, 1941, 1942 and 1945
5	Obdulio Varela	20	1939, 1941, 1942, 1945 and 1946
5	Diego Pérez	20	2001, 2004, 2007 and 2011
8	Pascual Somma	19	1916, 1917, 1920, 1921, 1922 and 1923
8	William Martínez	19	1953, 1955, 1956 and 1959 (ARG)
8	Diego Godín	19	2007, 2011, 2015, 2016, 2019 and 2021
8	Edinson Cavani	19	2011, 2015, 2016, 2019 and 2021
8	Luis Suárez	19	2011, 2019, 2021 and 2024

== Top goalscorers ==
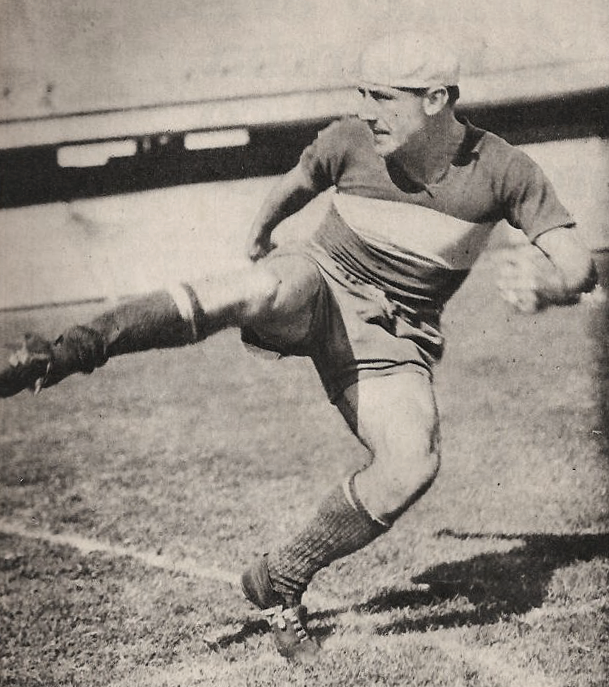
Severino Varela scored five goals each at three separate continental championships, making him Uruguay's top scorer at continental championships.

Rank	Player	Goals	Tournaments (goals)
1	Severino Varela	15	1937 (5), 1939 (5) and 1942 (5)
2	Héctor Scarone	13	1917 (2), 1919 (1), 1923 (1), 1926 (6) and 1927 (3)
3	Ángel Romano	12	1917 (4), 1920 (3), 1921 (2), 1924 (2) and 1926 (1)
3	Roberto Porta	12	1939 (3), 1941 (1), 1942 (5) and 1945 (3)
5	Pedro Petrone	10	1923 (3), 1924 (4) and 1927 (3)
5	Héctor Castro	10	1926 (6), 1927 (2) and 1935 (2)
5	Javier Ambrois	10	1956 (1) and 1957 (9)
8	Nicolás Falero	9	1945 (1) and 1947 (8)
9	Luis Suárez	8	2011 (4), 2019 (2), 2021 (1) and 2024 (1)
10	José María Medina	7	1946
10	Guillermo Escalada	7	1956 (3), 1959 [ARG] (2) and 1959 [ECU] (2)
10	José Sasia	7	1957 (1), 1959 [ARG] (3) and 1959 [ECU] (3)

== Players with multiple titles ==
Rank	Player	Championships
1	Ángel Romano	6 (1916, 1917, 1920, 1923, 1924, 1926)
2	Pascual Somma	4 (1916, 1917, 1920, 1923)
2	Héctor Scarone	4 (1917, 1923, 1924, 1926)
2	José Nasazzi	4* (1923, 1924, 1926, 1935)
5	Alfredo Foglino	3 (1916, 1917, 1920)
5	José Pérez	3 (1916, 1917, 1920)
5	Antonio Urdinarán	3 (1916, 1917, 1920)
5	José Piendibene	3 (1916, 1917, 1920)
5	Alfredo Zibechi	3 (1916, 1920, 1924)
5	José Vanzzino	3 (1916, 1917, 1926)
5	José Leandro Andrade	3 (1923, 1924, 1926)
5	Alfredo Ghierra	3 (1923, 1924, 1926)
5	Andrés Mazali	3 (1923, 1924, 1926)
5	Santos Urdinarán	3 (1923, 1924, 1926)
5	Enzo Francéscoli	3 (1983, 1987, 1995)
16	28 players	2

* Additionally, José Nasazzi won the title once as head coach of Uruguay in 1942.

== Awards and records ==
Team awards

- Champions (15): 1916, 1917, 1920, 1923, 1924, 1926, 1935, 1942, 1956, 1959 (Ecuador), 1967, 1983, 1987, 1995, 2011
- Runners-up (6): 1919, 1927, 1939, 1941, 1989, 1999
- Third place (9): 1921, 1922, 1929, 1937, 1947, 1953, 1957, 2004, 2024
- Fair Play Award: 2011

Individual awards

- MVP 1916: Isabelino Gradín
- MVP 1917: Héctor Scarone
- MVP 1920: José Piendibene
- MVP 1923 and 1935: José Nasazzi
- MVP 1924: Pedro Petrone
- MVP 1926: José Leandro Andrade
- MVP 1942: Obdulio Varela
- MVP 1956: Oscar Míguez
- MVP 1959 (Ecuador): Alcides Silveira
- MVP 1967: Pedro Rocha
- MVP 1983 and 1995: Enzo Francéscoli
- MVP 1989: Ruben Sosa
- MVP 2011: Luis Suárez
- Top scorer 1916: Isabelino Gradín (3 goals)
- Top scorer 1917: Ángel Romano (4 goals)
- Top scorer 1920: Ángel Romano and José Pérez (3 goals each) (shared)
- Top scorer 1923: Pedro Petrone (3 goals) (shared)
- Top scorer 1924: Pedro Petrone (4 goals)
- Top scorer 1927: Pedro Petrone, Héctor Scarone and Roberto Figueroa (3 goals each) (shared)
- Top scorer 1946: José María Medina (7 goals)
- Top scorer 1947: Nicolás Falero (8 goals)
- Top scorer 1957: Javier Ambrois (9 goals) (shared)
- Top scorer 1983: Carlos Aguilera (3 goals) (shared)
- Best young player 2011: Sebastián Coates

Team records

- Most titles: 15 (shared with Argentina)
- Most matches played: 212

Individual records

- Most goals in one tournament: Javier Ambrois (9 goals in 1957, shared with Jair in 1949 and Humberto Maschio in 1957)
- Most tournament participations: Ángel Romano (9, 1916–1926)

== See also ==
- Uruguay at the FIFA World Cup
