= Copa América awards =

This is a list of awards presented to players and teams that have distringuished themselves at the end of each Copa América final tournament.

== Awards ==
There are currently five post-tournament awards:

- the Golden Ball for most valuable player, first officially awarded in 1987;
- the Golden Boot for most prolific goal scorer;
- the Golden Glove for most outstanding goalkeeper, first awarded in 2011;
- the Team of the Tournament for best combined team of players at the tournament, first awarded in 2004;
- the Fair Play Award for the team with the best record of fair play, first awarded in 2011.

In addition, the Best Young Player award has been given out intermittently.

== Golden Ball ==
The current Golden Ball award was introduced in the 1987 Copa América. The Rec.Sport.Soccer Statistics Foundation provides a list of the best players from the first edition in 1916, who are listed below as unofficial recipients.

=== Unofficial ===
This is an unofficial list of the recipients of the best player award provided by the Rec.Sport.Soccer Statistics Foundation.

Year	Hosts	Winner
1916	Argentina	(Uruguay) Isabelino Gradín
1917	Argentina	(Uruguay) Héctor Scarone
1919	Brazil	(Brazil) Arthur Friedenreich
1920	Chile	(Uruguay) José Piendibene
1921	Argentina	(Argentina) Américo Tesoriere
1922	Brazil	(Brazil) Fortes
1923	Uruguay	(Uruguay) José Nasazzi
1924	Uruguay	(Uruguay) Pedro Petrone
1925	Argentina	(Argentina) Manuel Seoane
1926	Chile	(Uruguay) José Leandro Andrade
1927	Peru	(Argentina) Manuel Seoane
1929	Argentina	(Argentina) Manuel Ferreira
1935	Peru	(Uruguay) José Nasazzi
1937	Argentina	(Argentina) Vicente de la Mata
1939	Peru	(Peru) Teodoro Fernández
1941	Chile	(Chile) Sergio Livingstone
1942	Uruguay	(Uruguay) Obdulio Varela
1945	Chile	(Brazil) Domingos da Guia
1946	Argentina	(Argentina) Adolfo Pedernera
1947	Ecuador	(Argentina) José Manuel Moreno
1949	Brazil	(Brazil) Ademir de Menezes
1953	Peru	(Paraguay) Heriberto Herrera
1955	Chile	(Chile) Enrique Hormazábal
1956	Uruguay	(Uruguay) Óscar Míguez
1957	Peru	(Argentina) Omar Sívori
1959	Argentina	(Brazil) Pelé
1959	Ecuador	(Uruguay) Alcides Silveira
1963	Bolivia	(Bolivia) Ramiro Blacut
1967	Uruguay	(Uruguay) Pedro Rocha
1975	Various	(Peru) Teófilo Cubillas
1979	Various	(Chile) Carlos Caszely
1983	Various	(Uruguay) Enzo Francescoli

=== Official ===
Year	Hosts	Winner	Ref.
1987	Argentina	(Colombia) Carlos Valderrama	
1989	Brazil	(Uruguay) Rubén Sosa	
1991	Chile	(Argentina) Leonardo Rodríguez	
1993	Ecuador	(Argentina) Sergio Goycochea	
1995	Uruguay	(Uruguay) Enzo Francescoli	
1997	Bolivia	(Brazil) Ronaldo	
1999	Paraguay	(Brazil) Rivaldo	
2001	Colombia	(Honduras) Amado Guevara	
2004	Peru	(Brazil) Adriano	
2007	Venezuela	(Brazil) Robinho	
2011	Argentina	(Uruguay) Luis Suárez	
2015	Chile	(Argentina) Lionel Messi (Note: Lionel Messi rejected the award.)	
2016	United States	(Chile) Alexis Sánchez	
2019	Brazil	(Brazil) Dani Alves	
2021	Brazil	(Argentina) Lionel Messi	
2024	United States	(Colombia) James Rodríguez	

== Golden Boot ==
The Golden Boot is assigned to the top scorer of each edition.

Year	Hosts	Winner(s)	Goals	Ref.
1916	Argentina	(Uruguay) Isabelino Gradín	3	
1917	Uruguay	(Uruguay) Ángel Romano	4	
1919	Brazil	(Brazil) Arthur Friedenreich (Brazil) Neco	4	
1920	Chile	(Uruguay) José Pérez (Uruguay) Ángel Romano	3	
1921	Argentina	(Argentina) Julio Libonatti	3	
1922	Brazil	(Argentina) Juan Francia	4	
1923	Uruguay	(Argentina) Vicente Aguirre (Uruguay) Pedro Petrone	3	
1924	Uruguay	(Uruguay) Pedro Petrone	4	
1925	Argentina	(Argentina) Manuel Seoane	6	
1926	Chile	(Chile) David Arellano	7	
1927	Peru	(Argentina) Alfredo Carricaberry (Argentina) Segundo Luna (Uruguay) Roberto Figueroa (Uruguay) Pedro Petrone (Uruguay) Héctor Scarone	3	
1929	Argentina	(Paraguay) Aurelio González	5	
1935	Peru	(Argentina) Herminio Masantonio	4	
1937	Argentina	(Chile) Raúl Toro	7	
1939	Peru	(Peru) Teodoro Fernández	7	
1941	Chile	(Argentina) Juan Marvezzi	5	
1942	Uruguay	(Argentina) Herminio Masantonio (Argentina) José Manuel Moreno	7	
1945	Chile	(Argentina) Norberto Méndez (Brazil) Heleno de Freitas	6	
1946	Argentina	(Uruguay) José María Medina	7	
1947	Ecuador	(Uruguay) Nicolás Falero	8	
1949	Brazil	(Brazil) Jair	9	
1953	Peru	(Chile) Francisco Molina	7	
1955	Chile	(Argentina) Rodolfo Micheli	8	
1956	Uruguay	(Chile) Enrique Hormazábal	4	
1957	Peru	(Argentina) Humberto Maschio (Uruguay) Javier Ambrois	9	
1959	Argentina	(Brazil) Pelé	8	
1959	Ecuador	(Argentina) José Sanfilippo	6	
1963	Bolivia	(Ecuador) Carlos Alberto Raffo	6	
1967	Uruguay	(Argentina) Luis Artime	5	
1975	Various	(Argentina) Leopoldo Luque (Colombia) Ernesto Díaz	4	
1979	Various	(Chile) Jorge Peredo (Paraguay) Eugenio Morel	4	
1983	Various	(Argentina) Jorge Burruchaga (Brazil) Roberto Dinamite (Uruguay) Carlos Aguilera	3	
1987	Argentina	(Colombia) Arnoldo Iguarán	4	
1989	Brazil	(Brazil) Bebeto	6	
1991	Chile	(Argentina) Gabriel Batistuta	6	
1993	Ecuador	(Venezuela) José Luis Dolgetta	4	
1995	Uruguay	(Argentina) Gabriel Batistuta (Mexico) Luis García	4	
1997	Bolivia	(Mexico) Luis Hernández	6	
1999	Paraguay	(Brazil) Rivaldo (Brazil) Ronaldo	5	
2001	Colombia	(Colombia) Víctor Aristizábal	6	
2004	Peru	(Brazil) Adriano	7	
2007	Venezuela	(Brazil) Robinho	6	
2011	Argentina	(Peru) Paolo Guerrero	5	
2015	Chile	(Chile) Eduardo Vargas (Peru) Paolo Guerrero	4	
2016	United States	(Chile) Eduardo Vargas	6	
2019	Brazil	(Brazil) Everton Soares (Peru) Paolo Guerrero	3	
2021	Brazil	(Argentina) Lionel Messi (Colombia) Luis Díaz	4	
2024	United States	(Argentina) Lautaro Martínez	5	

== Golden Glove ==
Year	Hosts	Winner	Ref.
2011	Argentina	(Paraguay) Justo Villar	
2015	Chile	(Chile) Claudio Bravo	
2016	United States	(Chile) Claudio Bravo	
2019	Brazil	(Brazil) Alisson	
2021	Brazil	(Argentina) Emiliano Martínez	
2024	United States	(Argentina) Emiliano Martínez	

== Team of the Tournament ==
Year	Hosts	Goalkeeper	Defenders	Midfielders	Forwards	Manager	Ref.
2004	Peru	(Brazil) Júlio César	(Argentina) Javier Zanetti (Argentina) Roberto Ayala (Brazil) Juan (Uruguay) Darío Rodríguez	(Argentina) Lucho González (Mexico) Pável Pardo (Brazil) Renato (Brazil) Alex	(Argentina) Carlos Tevez (Brazil) Adriano	—	
2007	Venezuela	(Brazil) Doni	(Argentina) Javier Zanetti (Mexico) Jonny Magallón (Brazil) Juan (Uruguay) Jorge Fucile	(Brazil) Júlio Baptista (Argentina) Javier Mascherano (Argentina) Juan Román Riquelme	(Brazil) Robinho (Mexico) Nery Castillo (Argentina) Lionel Messi	—	
2011	Argentina	(Venezuela) Renny Vega	(Colombia) Luis Amaranto Perea (Uruguay) Diego Lugano (Paraguay) Paulo Da Silva	(Argentina) Javier Mascherano (Colombia) Fredy Guarín (Uruguay) Álvaro Pereira (Peru) Carlos Lobatón	(Argentina) Lionel Messi (Uruguay) Luis Suárez (Peru) Paolo Guerrero	Óscar Tabárez (Uruguay)	
2015	Chile	(Chile) Claudio Bravo	(Colombia) Jeison Murillo (Chile) Gary Medel (Argentina) Nicolás Otamendi	(Peru) Christian Cueva (Chile) Marcelo Díaz (Argentina) Javier Mascherano (Chile) Arturo Vidal	(Chile) Eduardo Vargas (Peru) Paolo Guerrero (Argentina) Lionel Messi	Jorge Sampaoli (Chile)	
2016	United States	(Chile) Claudio Bravo	(Chile) Mauricio Isla (Argentina) Nicolás Otamendi (Chile) Gary Medel (Chile) Jean Beausejour	(Argentina) Javier Mascherano (Chile) Arturo Vidal (Chile) Charles Aránguiz	(Argentina) Lionel Messi (Chile) Eduardo Vargas (Chile) Alexis Sánchez	—	
2019	Brazil	(Brazil) Alisson	(Brazil) Dani Alves (Uruguay) José María Giménez (Brazil) Thiago Silva (Peru) Miguel Trauco	(Brazil) Arthur (Argentina) Leandro Paredes (Chile) Arturo Vidal	(Colombia) James Rodríguez (Peru) Paolo Guerrero (Brazil) Everton	—	
2021	Brazil	(Argentina) Emiliano Martínez	(Chile) Mauricio Isla (Argentina) Cristian Romero (Brazil) Marquinhos (Ecuador) Pervis Estupiñán	(Argentina) Rodrigo De Paul (Brazil) Casemiro (Peru) Yoshimar Yotún	(Argentina) Lionel Messi (Brazil) Neymar (Colombia) Luis Díaz	—	
2024	United States	(Argentina) Emiliano Martínez	(Ecuador) Piero Hincapié (Colombia) Davinson Sánchez (Argentina) Cristian Romero (Canada) Alistair Johnston	(Colombia) James Rodríguez (Uruguay) Manuel Ugarte (Argentina) Rodrigo De Paul	(Brazil) Raphinha (Argentina) Lautaro Martínez (Argentina) Lionel Messi	—	

== Fair Play Award ==
Year	Hosts	Winner	Ref.
2011	Argentina	Uruguay	
2015	Chile	Peru	
2016	United States	Argentina	
2019	Brazil	Brazil	
2021	Brazil	Brazil	
2024	United States	Colombia	

== Best Young Player ==
This award has been given out only in the 2007, 2011, and 2015 editions.

Year	Hosts	Winner
2007	Venezuela	(Argentina) Lionel Messi
2011	Argentina	(Uruguay) Sebastián Coates
2015	Chile	(Colombia) Jeison Murillo

== See also ==
- FIFA World Cup awards
- UEFA European Championship awards
- Africa Cup of Nations awards
- AFC Asian Cup awards
- CONCACAF Gold Cup awards
- OFC Men's Nations Cup awards
