= List of Uruguay international footballers =

The Uruguay national football team represents the country of Uruguay in international association football. It is fielded by Uruguayan Football Association (Spanish: Asociación Uruguaya de Fútbol), the governing body of football in Uruguay, and competes as a member of the CONMEBOL. As hundreds of players have played for the team since it started officially registering its players, only players with 20 or more official caps are included in this list.

On 20 June 2013, Diego Forlán became the first player to play 100 official matches for Uruguay. Since then, eight other players – Maxi Pereira, Diego Godín, Cristian Rodríguez, Edinson Cavani, Luis Suárez, Fernando Muslera, Martín Cáceres, and José María Giménez – have reached this milestone.

== List of players ==
Key
| § | Player is active in international football and has been called up to the squad within the last 24 months |

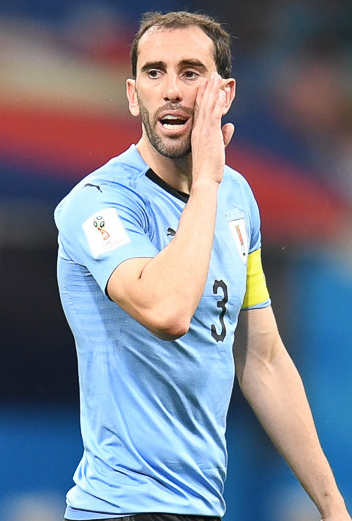
Diego Godín (161 caps, 8 goals) is Uruguay's all-time most capped player since 2019.

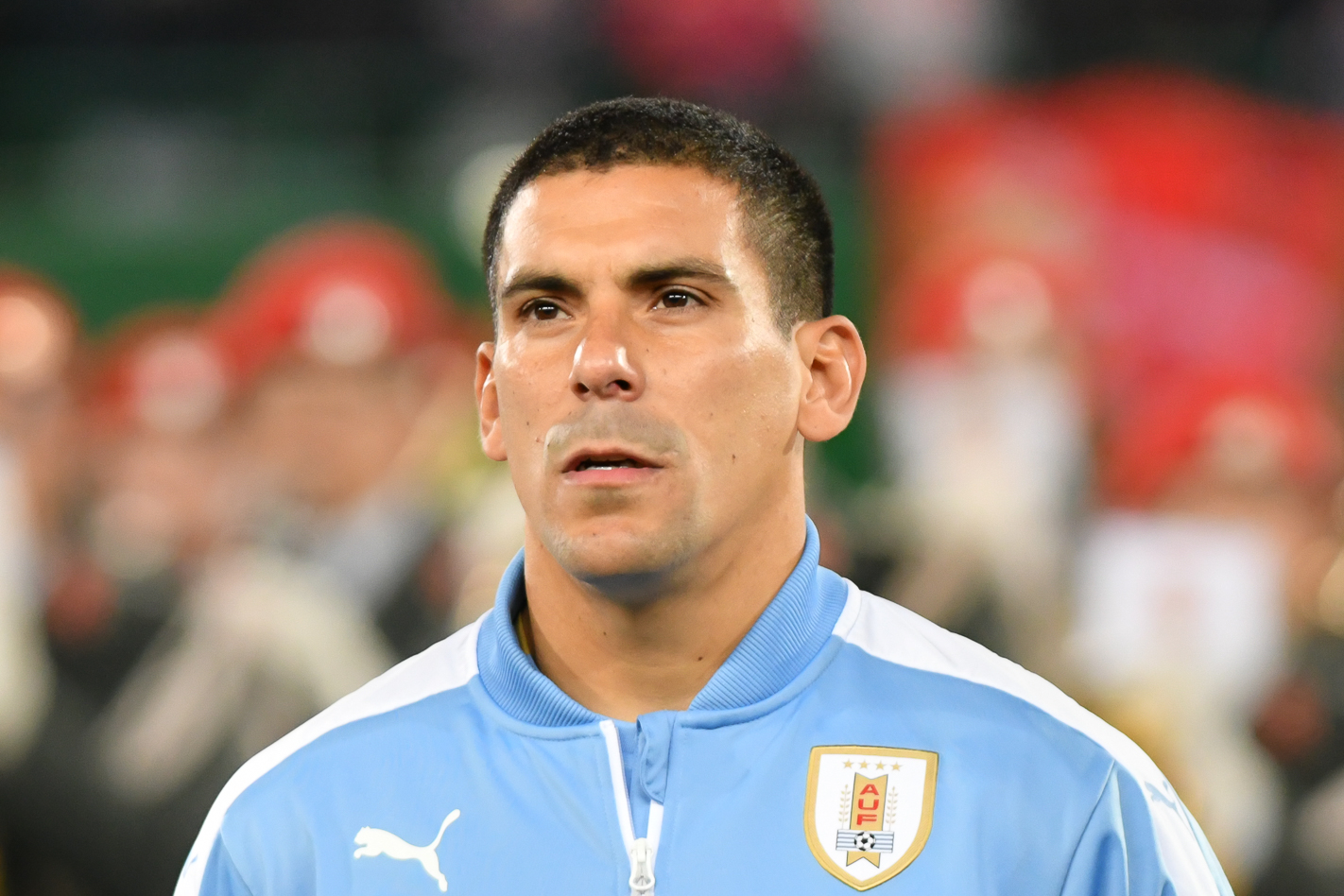
Maxi Pereira (125 caps, 3 goals) was Uruguay's most capped player from 2016 to 2019.

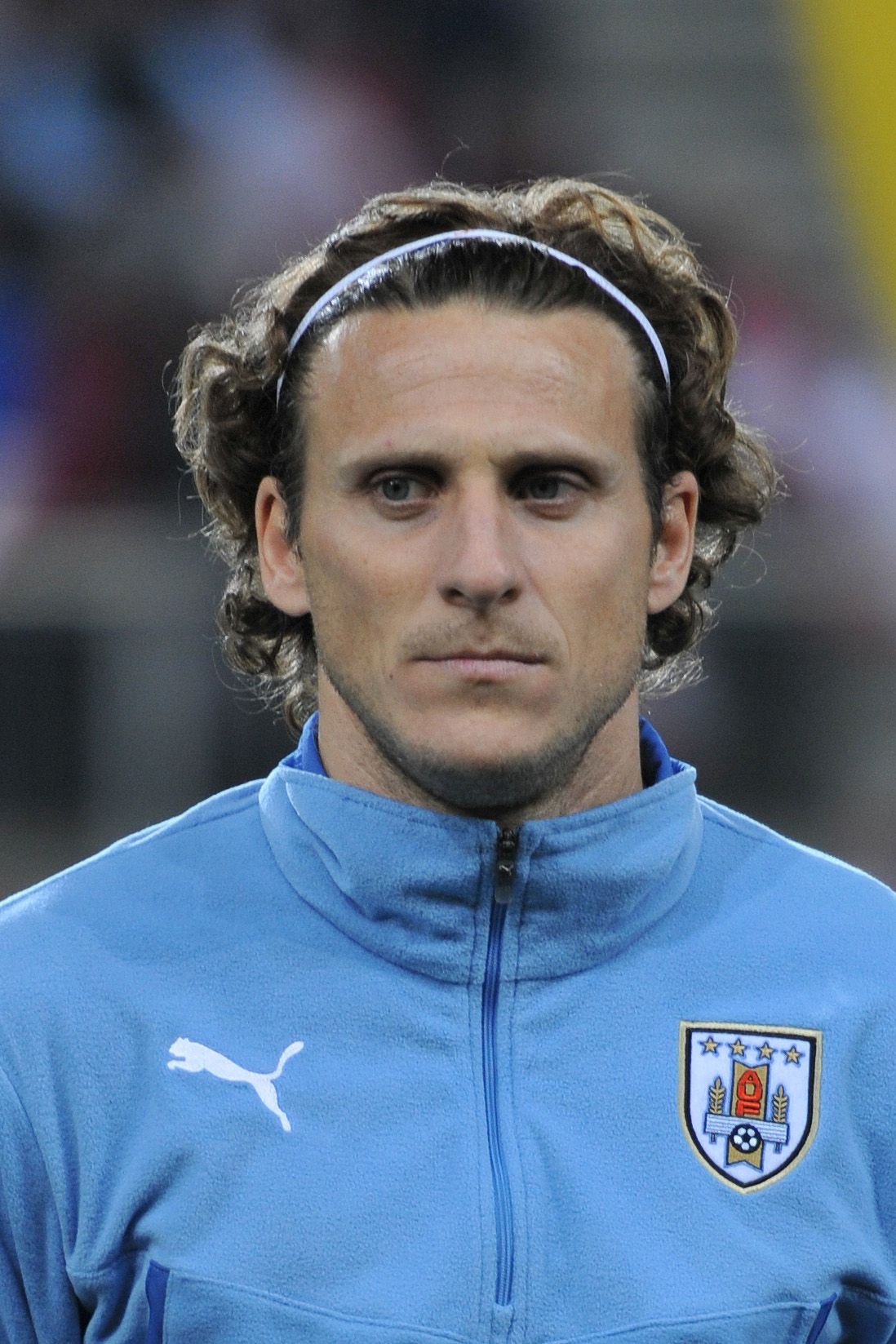
Diego Forlán is the first player to win 100 caps for Uruguay. He was also country's most capped player from 2011 to 2016.

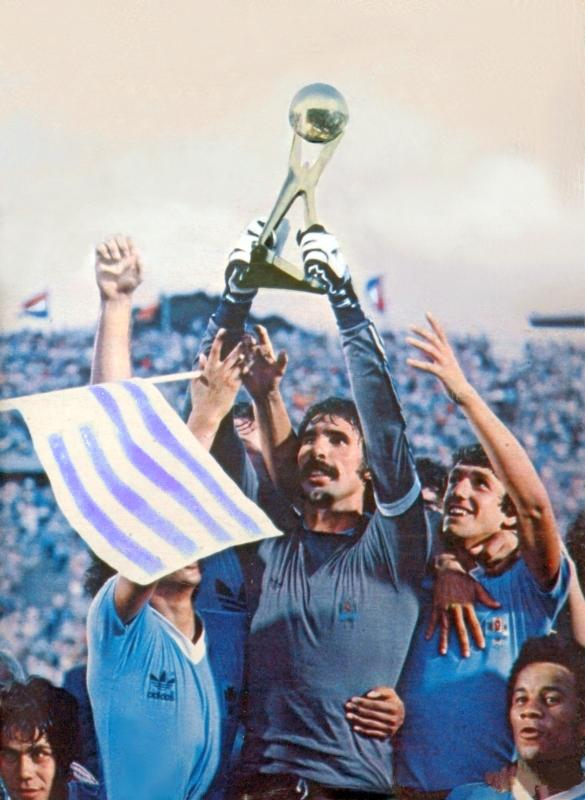
Rodolfo Rodríguez (lifting the trophy) was Uruguay's most capped player from 1985 to 2011.

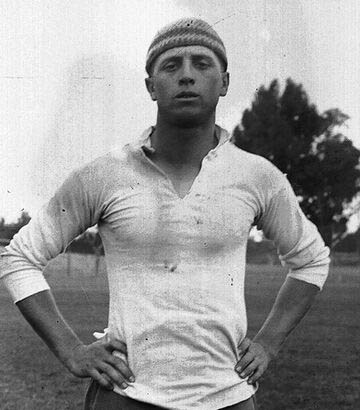
Ángel Romano (70 caps, 28 goals) was Uruguay's most capped player from 1923 to 1985.

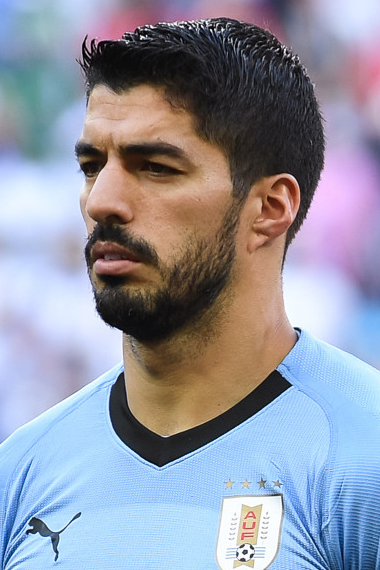
Luis Suárez (143 caps, 69 goals) is Uruguay's all-time leading goal scorer.

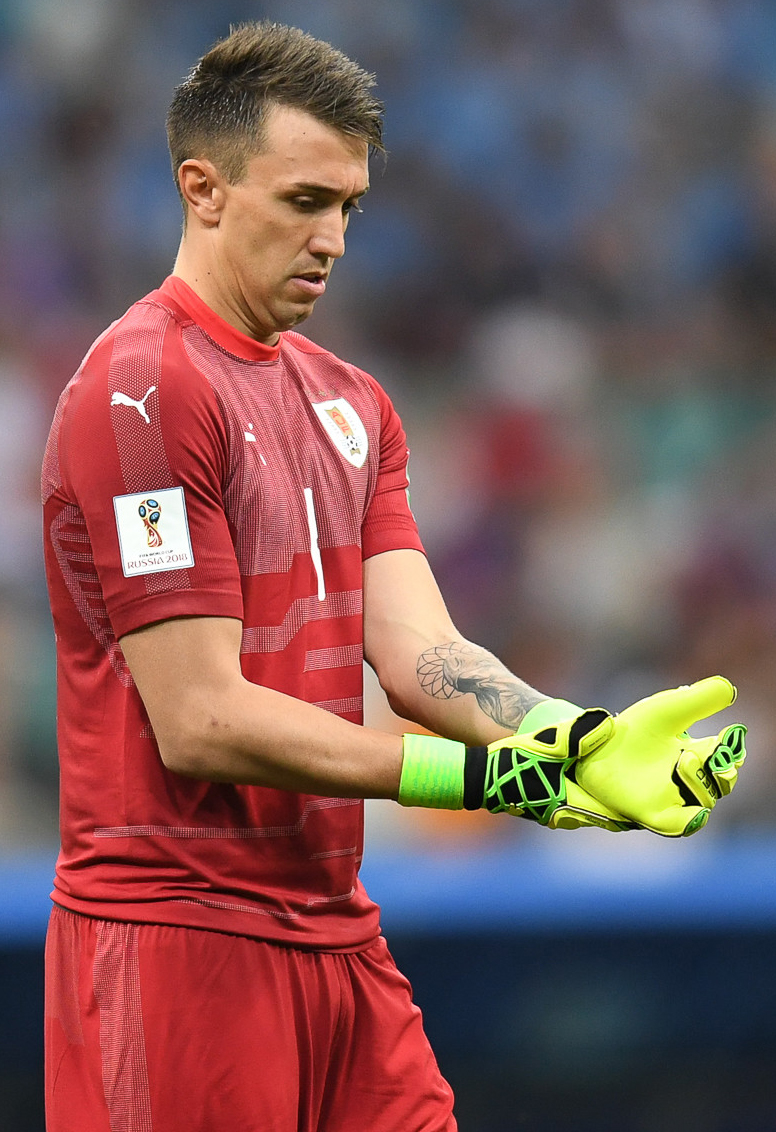
Fernando Muslera (137 caps) is Uruguay's all-time most capped goalkeeper.

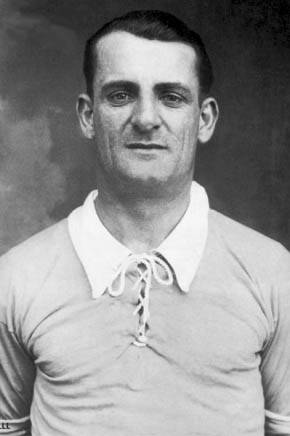
José Nasazzi (40 caps) led Uruguay to victory at the 1924 Olympics, 1928 Olympics and the 1930 FIFA World Cup.

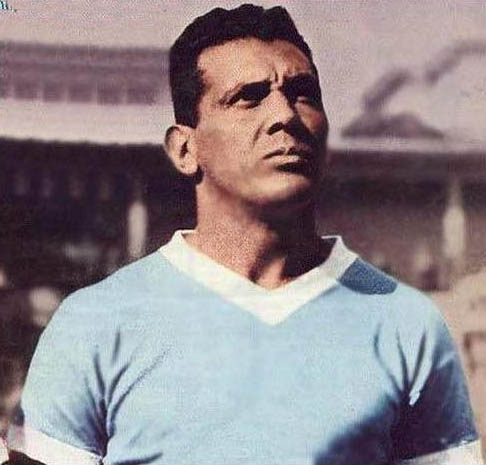
Obdulio Varela (45 caps, 9 goals) led Uruguay to victory at the 1950 FIFA World Cup.

| Player | Caps | Goals | First cap | Last cap |
|---|---|---|---|---|
| Diego Godín | 161 | 8 | 2005 | 2022 |
| Luis Suárez | 143 | 69 | 2007 | 2024 |
| Fernando Muslera | 137 | 0 | 2009 | 2026 |
| Edinson Cavani | 136 | 58 | 2008 | 2022 |
| Maxi Pereira | 125 | 3 | 2005 | 2018 |
| Martín Cáceres | 116 | 4 | 2007 | 2022 |
| Diego Forlán | 112 | 36 | 2002 | 2014 |
| Cristian Rodríguez | 110 | 11 | 2003 | 2018 |
| José María Giménez | 102 | 8 | 2013 | 2026 |
| Diego Lugano | 95 | 9 | 2003 | 2014 |
| Egidio Arévalo | 90 | 0 | 2006 | 2017 |
| Diego Pérez | 89 | 2 | 2001 | 2014 |
| Álvaro Pereira | 83 | 7 | 2008 | 2016 |
| Rodrigo Bentancur | 82 | 3 | 2017 | 2026 |
| Federico Valverde | 78 | 10 | 2017 | 2026 |
| Rodolfo Rodríguez | 78 | 0 | 1976 | 1986 |
| Fabián Carini | 74 | 0 | 1999 | 2009 |
| Nahitan Nández | 74 | 0 | 2015 | 2026 |
| Enzo Francescoli | 73 | 17 | 1982 | 1997 |
| Álvaro González | 72 | 3 | 2006 | 2017 |
| Ángel Romano | 70 | 28 | 1911 | 1927 |
| Sebastián Abreu | 70 | 26 | 1996 | 2012 |
| Matías Vecino | 70 | 6 | 2016 | 2024 |
| Álvaro Recoba | 68 | 10 | 1995 | 2007 |
| Pablo García | 65 | 2 | 1997 | 2007 |
| Carlos Aguilera | 64 | 22 | 1982 | 1997 |
| Walter Gargano | 64 | 1 | 2006 | 2014 |
| Giorgian de Arrascaeta | 63 | 14 | 2014 | 2026 |
| Nicolás Lodeiro | 60 | 5 | 2009 | 2019 |
| Paolo Montero | 60 | 5 | 1991 | 2005 |
| Jorge Barrios | 60 | 3 | 1980 | 1992 |
| José Herrera | 57 | 4 | 1988 | 1997 |
| Nelson Gutiérrez | 57 | 0 | 1983 | 1990 |
| Cayetano Saporiti | 56 | 0 | 1905 | 1919 |
| Sebastián Eguren | 54 | 7 | 2001 | 2013 |
| William Martínez | 54 | 2 | 1950 | 1965 |
| Fernando Morena | 53 | 22 | 1971 | 1983 |
| Pedro Rocha | 52 | 17 | 1961 | 1974 |
| Héctor Scarone | 51 | 31 | 1917 | 1930 |
| Sebastián Coates | 51 | 2 | 2011 | 2023 |
| Alfredo Foglino | 51 | 0 | 1912 | 1923 |
| Cristhian Stuani | 50 | 8 | 2012 | 2019 |
| Darío Rodríguez | 50 | 3 | 2000 | 2007 |
| Néstor Gonçalves | 50 | 0 | 1957 | 1971 |
| Darío Silva | 49 | 14 | 1994 | 2005 |
| Jorge Fucile | 49 | 0 | 2006 | 2017 |
| Hugo de León | 48 | 0 | 1979 | 1990 |
| Eber Moas | 48 | 0 | 1988 | 1997 |
| Darwin Núñez | 46 | 16 | 2019 | 2026 |
| Rubén Sosa | 46 | 15 | 1984 | 1995 |
| Obdulio Varela | 45 | 9 | 1939 | 1954 |
| Rubén Paz | 45 | 8 | 1979 | 1990 |
| Gustavo Méndez | 45 | 0 | 1993 | 2002 |
| Matías Viña | 44 | 1 | 2019 | 2026 |
| Lucas Torreira | 44 | 0 | 2018 | 2026 |
| José Piendibene | 43 | 22 | 1909 | 1922 |
| José Sasía | 43 | 12 | 1956 | 1966 |
| Pablo Bengoechea | 43 | 6 | 1986 | 1997 |
| Santiago Ostolaza | 43 | 6 | 1985 | 1993 |
| Facundo Pellistri | 43 | 2 | 2022 | 2026 |
| Gastón Ramírez | 43 | 0 | 2010 | 2018 |
| Mathías Olivera | 42 | 2 | 2022 | 2026 |
| Julio Montero Castillo | 42 | 1 | 1967 | 1978 |
| Víctor Rodríguez Andrade | 42 | 0 | 1947 | 1957 |
| Venancio Ramos | 41 | 5 | 1978 | 1991 |
| Pascual Somma | 41 | 3 | 1911 | 1923 |
| Eduardo Acevedo | 41 | 1 | 1983 | 1986 |
| Víctor Espárrago | 41 | 1 | 1965 | 1974 |
| José Benincasa | 41 | 0 | 1910 | 1922 |
| Andrés Scotti | 40 | 1 | 2006 | 2013 |
| Fernando Álvez | 40 | 0 | 1980 | 1997 |
| Gianni Guigou | 40 | 0 | 1999 | 2004 |
| José Nasazzi | 40 | 0 | 1923 | 1936 |
| Óscar Míguez | 39 | 27 | 1950 | 1958 |
| Manuel Ugarte | 39 | 1 | 2021 | 2026 |
| Diego López | 39 | 0 | 1994 | 2005 |
| Roque Máspoli | 39 | 0 | 1944 | 1955 |
| Luis Cubilla | 38 | 11 | 1959 | 1974 |
| Nicolás de la Cruz | 38 | 6 | 2020 | 2026 |
| Alejandro Lembo | 38 | 2 | 1999 | 2004 |
| Álvaro Gutiérrez | 38 | 1 | 1991 | 1997 |
| Carlos Sánchez | 38 | 1 | 2014 | 2018 |
| Alfredo Zibechi | 38 | 1 | 1915 | 1924 |
| José Vanzzino | 38 | 0 | 1913 | 1927 |
| Brian Rodríguez | 37 | 4 | 2019 | 2026 |
| Ladislao Mazurkiewicz | 37 | 0 | 1965 | 1974 |
| Schubert Gambetta | 36 | 3 | 1941 | 1952 |
| Néstor Montelongo | 36 | 0 | 1979 | 1985 |
| Sergio Rochet | 36 | 0 | 2022 | 2026 |
| Carlos Borges | 35 | 10 | 1954 | 1959 |
| Maximiliano Araújo | 35 | 9 | 2023 | 2026 |
| Sergio Daniel Martínez | 35 | 6 | 1988 | 1997 |
| Roberto Porta | 34 | 14 | 1937 | 1945 |
| Vladas Douksas | 34 | 3 | 1959 | 1966 |
| Nelson Agresta | 34 | 1 | 1979 | 1983 |
| Robert Siboldi | 34 | 0 | 1992 | 1997 |
| Guillermo Varela | 34 | 0 | 2017 | 2026 |
| Waldemar Victorino | 33 | 15 | 1976 | 1981 |
| Marcelo Saralegui | 33 | 6 | 1992 | 1997 |
| Darío Pereyra | 33 | 5 | 1975 | 1986 |
| Ildo Maneiro | 33 | 3 | 1970 | 1979 |
| José Leandro Andrade | 33 | 1 | 1923 | 1930 |
| Gonzalo de los Santos | 33 | 1 | 1996 | 2005 |
| Víctor Diogo | 33 | 1 | 1979 | 1986 |
| Luis Ubiña | 33 | 1 | 1965 | 1973 |
| Matías González | 33 | 0 | 1949 | 1956 |
| Jorge Pacheco | 33 | 0 | 1910 | 1917 |
| Marcelo Zalayeta | 32 | 10 | 1997 | 2005 |
| Maxi Gómez | 32 | 4 | 2017 | 2023 |
| Washington González | 32 | 0 | 1978 | 1983 |
| Javier Ambrois | 31 | 17 | 1952 | 1957 |
| Pablo Dacal | 31 | 7 | 1908 | 1916 |
| Antonio Alzamendi | 31 | 6 | 1978 | 1990 |
| Vicente Sánchez | 31 | 5 | 2001 | 2008 |
| Jonathan Rodríguez | 31 | 3 | 2014 | 2023 |
| Alfonso Domínguez | 31 | 2 | 1987 | 1990 |
| Ronald Araújo | 31 | 1 | 2020 | 2026 |
| Walter Taibo | 31 | 0 | 1955 | 1966 |
| Eusebio Tejera | 31 | 0 | 1945 | 1954 |
| Guillermo Escalada | 30 | 11 | 1955 | 1962 |
| Daniel Fonseca | 30 | 10 | 1990 | 1997 |
| José Pérez | 30 | 5 | 1913 | 1920 |
| Fabián Estoyanoff | 30 | 4 | 2001 | 2007 |
| Lorenzo Fernández | 30 | 4 | 1925 | 1935 |
| Julio César Cortés | 30 | 3 | 1962 | 1970 |
| Miguel Bossio | 30 | 1 | 1983 | 1986 |
| Agenor Muñiz | 30 | 1 | 1933 | 1943 |
| Walter Olivera | 30 | 1 | 1973 | 1983 |
| Omar Caetano | 30 | 0 | 1965 | 1969 |
| Daniel Martínez | 30 | 0 | 1980 | 1985 |
| Abel Hernández | 29 | 11 | 2010 | 2017 |
| Héctor Silva | 29 | 7 | 1961 | 1969 |
| Domingo Pérez | 29 | 6 | 1959 | 1967 |
| José Zalazar | 29 | 4 | 1984 | 1993 |
| Mario Saralegui | 29 | 2 | 1979 | 1986 |
| Mario Regueiro | 29 | 1 | 2000 | 2007 |
| Sebastián Cáceres | 29 | 0 | 2022 | 2026 |
| Pedro Petrone | 28 | 24 | 1923 | 1930 |
| Nicolás Olivera | 28 | 8 | 1997 | 2006 |
| Horacio Troche | 28 | 0 | 1959 | 1966 |
| Carlos Scarone | 27 | 18 | 1909 | 1922 |
| Richard Morales | 27 | 6 | 2001 | 2005 |
| Gabriel Cedrés | 27 | 5 | 1990 | 2000 |
| José Perdomo | 27 | 3 | 1987 | 1990 |
| Marcelo Sosa | 27 | 2 | 2003 | 2005 |
| Ruben Pereira | 27 | 1 | 1988 | 1996 |
| Gonzalo Sorondo | 27 | 0 | 2000 | 2005 |
| Julio Abbadie | 26 | 14 | 1952 | 1966 |
| Pedro Cea | 26 | 13 | 1923 | 1932 |
| Wilmar Cabrera | 26 | 6 | 1983 | 1986 |
| Jorge da Silva | 26 | 6 | 1982 | 1993 |
| Federico Magallanes | 26 | 5 | 1995 | 2002 |
| Gus Poyet | 26 | 3 | 1993 | 2000 |
| Juan Masnik | 26 | 0 | 1967 | 1974 |
| Daniel Sánchez | 26 | 0 | 1988 | 1993 |
| Julio Morales | 25 | 11 | 1965 | 1981 |
| Marcelo Otero | 25 | 10 | 1994 | 2000 |
| Diego Rolán | 25 | 4 | 2014 | 2017 |
| Alfredo de los Santos | 25 | 0 | 1975 | 1983 |
| Álvaro Gestido | 25 | 0 | 1927 | 1940 |
| Severino Varela | 24 | 19 | 1935 | 1942 |
| Carlos Bueno | 24 | 13 | 2003 | 2008 |
| Diego Laxalt | 24 | 0 | 2016 | 2019 |
| José Moreira | 24 | 0 | 1976 | 1981 |
| Marcelo Romero | 24 | 0 | 1995 | 2004 |
| Gustavo Varela | 24 | 0 | 2000 | 2006 |
| Mauricio Victorino | 24 | 0 | 2006 | 2016 |
| Héctor Castro | 23 | 15 | 1926 | 1935 |
| Isabelino Gradín | 23 | 10 | 1915 | 1927 |
| Nelson Abeijón | 23 | 2 | 1994 | 2003 |
| Facundo Torres | 23 | 2 | 2021 | 2025 |
| Joe Bizera | 23 | 1 | 2001 | 2004 |
| Nelson Cabrera | 23 | 1 | 1988 | 1993 |
| Héctor Morán | 23 | 1 | 1988 | 1993 |
| Romeo Corbo | 23 | 0 | 1971 | 1974 |
| Diego Dorta | 23 | 0 | 1990 | 1996 |
| Joaquín Piquerez | 23 | 0 | 2021 | 2026 |
| Julio Pérez | 22 | 8 | 1947 | 1956 |
| Javier Chevantón | 22 | 7 | 2001 | 2008 |
| Juan Riephoff | 22 | 4 | 1940 | 1948 |
| Rubén da Silva | 22 | 3 | 1988 | 2000 |
| Juan Mujica | 22 | 2 | 1966 | 1970 |
| Lorenzo Unanue | 22 | 2 | 1975 | 1979 |
| Mathías Corujo | 22 | 1 | 2014 | 2017 |
| Mario Méndez | 22 | 1 | 1959 | 1968 |
| Carlos Diogo | 22 | 0 | 2003 | 2007 |
| Edgardo González | 22 | 0 | 1957 | 1965 |
| John Harley | 22 | 0 | 1909 | 1916 |
| Jorge Manicera | 22 | 0 | 1962 | 1967 |
| Luis Miramontes | 22 | 0 | 1956 | 1959 |
| Aníbal Paz | 22 | 0 | 1940 | 1950 |
| Roberto Sosa | 22 | 0 | 1959 | 1967 |
| Juan Alberto Schiaffino | 21 | 9 | 1946 | 1954 |
| José Urruzmendi | 21 | 8 | 1965 | 1967 |
| Oscar Chirimini | 21 | 4 | 1937 | 1944 |
| José García | 21 | 3 | 1945 | 1948 |
| Julio César Jiménez | 21 | 1 | 1971 | 1976 |
| Martín Aphesteguy | 21 | 0 | 1906 | 1915 |
| Gustavo Munúa | 21 | 0 | 1998 | 2004 |
| Aníbal Ciocca | 20 | 6 | 1935 | 1943 |
| Fernando Kanapkis | 20 | 5 | 1992 | 1993 |
| Bibiano Zapirain | 20 | 4 | 1942 | 1946 |
| Antonio Campolo | 20 | 3 | 1918 | 1929 |
| Agustín Canobbio | 20 | 2 | 2022 | 2026 |
| Santos Urdinarán | 20 | 2 | 1923 | 1930 |
| Atilio Ancheta | 20 | 1 | 1969 | 1971 |
| Carlos Carranza | 20 | 1 | 1953 | 1957 |
| Daniel Revelez | 20 | 1 | 1980 | 1991 |
| Guillermo Sanguinetti | 20 | 1 | 1991 | 1997 |
| Roberto Matosas | 20 | 0 | 1963 | 1971 |
| Andrés Mazali | 20 | 0 | 1924 | 1929 |
| José Santamaría | 20 | 0 | 1952 | 1957 |
| Tabaré Silva | 20 | 0 | 1994 | 2000 |
| Manuel Varela | 20 | 0 | 1914 | 1924 |

== See also ==
- Football in Uruguay
- Uruguay national football team records and statistics
- List of Uruguay national football team hat-tricks
