= List of Copa América hat-tricks =

This is a list of all hat-tricks scored in the Copa América; that is, the occasions where an individual footballer scored three or more goals in a single Copa América match. This is a relatively rare event: only 69 hat-tricks have been scored across the 48 editions of the Copa América tournament to date. As CONMEBOL is the governing body of football in South America, official hat-tricks are only noted when CONMEBOL recognizes that at least three goals were scored by one player in one match.

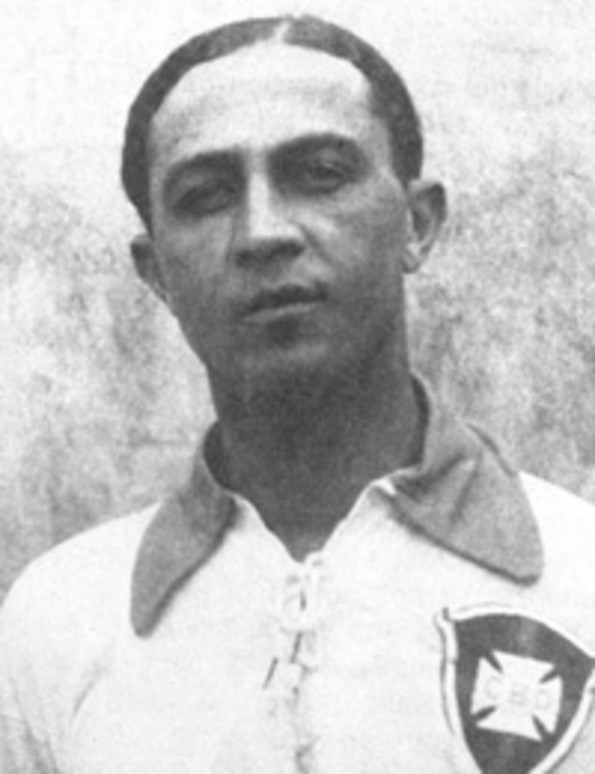
Arthur Friedenreich scored the first hat-trick in the tournament's history, in the 1919 edition.

The first hat-trick was scored by Arthur Friedenreich of Brazil, playing against Chile in the 1919 South American Championship; the most recent was by Eduardo Vargas of Chile, playing against Mexico in the 2016 Copa América Centenario.

The only editions not to have at least one hat-trick scored were 1916, 1917, 1920, 1921, 1922, 1937, 1956, 1979, 1983, 1989, 1991, 1993, 1995, 1997, 1999, 2001, 2019, 2021 and 2024. The record number of hat-tricks in a single Copa América tournament is five, which occurred in each of the 1926, 1942, 1945 and 1957 tournaments.

== Notable Copa América hat-tricks ==
- Arthur Friedenreich was the first player to score a hat-trick in a Copa América match, doing so on 11 May 1919 for Brazil against Chile.
- Ten players have scored two hat-tricks in Copa América matches: Ademir (1945 and 1949), Javier Ambrois (both 1957), David Arellano (both 1926), Teodoro Fernández (1939 and 1941), Herminio Masantonio (1935 and 1942), Pedro Petrone (1924 and 1927), Sylvio Pirillo (both 1942), José Sanfilippo (both 1959 (Ecuador)), Severino Varela (1939 and 1942) and Paolo Guerrero (2011 and 2015).
- Héctor Scarone, Juan Marvezzi, José Manuel Moreno and Evaristo are the only players in Copa América history to have scored five goals in a single match.
- There have been three occasions when two hat-tricks have been scored in the same match; when Uruguay defeated Bolivia in 1927, Pedro Petrone and Roberto Figueroa, both playing for Uruguay, scored three goals. Another occurred during the 1942 South American Championship: when Argentina defeated Ecuador, José Manuel Moreno scored five goals and Herminio Masantonio scored four, both for Argentina.
- The quickest hat-trick to be completed was José Manuel Moreno's three goals in ten minutes during the 1942 edition. He scored his third goal in the 22nd minute, after scoring his first in the 12th minute and his second in the 16th.
- The only players to have scored a hat-trick coming from the bench are Paulo Valentim in 1959 and Lionel Messi in 2016.
- Although the Copa América Centenario was a special edition, hat-tricks scored in that tournament are listed here.
- No player has scored a hat-trick against Argentina, nor has there been a hat-trick scored by a player for Bolivia, Ecuador or Venezuela.

== List ==
Sequence	Player	No. of goals	Time of goals	Representing	Final score	Opponent	Tournament	Round	Date
1.	Arthur Friedenreich	3	19', 38', 76'	Brazil	6–0	Chile	1919, Brazil	Final round	11 May 1919
2.	José Clarke	3	10', 23', 62'	Argentina	4–1	Chile	1919, Brazil	Final round	22 May 1919
3.	Valdino Aguirre	3	58', 77', 86'	Argentina	4–3	Paraguay	1923, Uruguay	Final round	29 October 1923
4.	Pedro Petrone	3	40', 53', 88'	Uruguay	5–0	Chile	1924, Uruguay	Final round	19 October 1924
5.	Manuel Seoane	3	41', 48', 74'	Argentina	4–1	Brazil	1925, Argentina	Final round	13 December 1925
6.	David Arellano	4	15', 41', 80', 84'	Chile	7–1	Bolivia	1926, Chile	Final round	12 October 1926
7.	Gabino Sosa	4	11', 32', 59', 87'	Argentina	8–0	Paraguay	1926, Chile	Final round	20 October 1926
−.	Ceferino Ramírez	3	68', 72', 88'	Paraguay	6–1	Bolivia	1926, Chile	Final round	23 October 1926
8.	Héctor Scarone	5	9', 12', 28', 39', 81'	Uruguay	6–0	Bolivia	1926, Chile	Final round	28 October 1926
9.	Héctor Castro	4	16', 23', 32', 72'	Uruguay	6–1	Paraguay	1926, Chile	Final round	1 November 1926
10.	David Arellano (II)	3	21', 64', 71'	Chile	5–1	Paraguay	1926, Chile	Final round	3 November 1926
11.	Pedro Petrone	3	18', 65', 81'	Uruguay	9–0	Bolivia	1927, Peru	Final round	6 November 1927
12.	Roberto Figueroa	3	19', 67', 69'	Uruguay	9–0	Bolivia	1927, Peru	Final round	6 November 1927
13.	Lorenzo Fernández	3	21', 29', 43'	Uruguay	4–1	Peru	1929, Argentina	Final round	29 November 1929
14.	Aurelio González	3	55', 63', 69'	Paraguay	5–0	Peru	1929, Argentina	Final round	16 November 1929
15.	Herminio Masantonio	3	10', 61', 81'	Argentina	4–1	Peru	1935, Peru	Final round	20 January 1935
−.	Alberto Zozaya	3	33', 75', 82'	Argentina	6–1	Paraguay	1937, Argentina	Final round	9 January 1937
16.	Teodoro Fernández	3	6', 34', 77'	Peru	5–2	Ecuador	1939, Peru	Final round	15 January 1939
17.	Severino Varela	3	53', 55', 81'	Uruguay	6–0	Ecuador	1939, Peru	Final round	22 January 1939
18.	Ismael Rivero	3	9', 23', 87'	Uruguay	6–0	Ecuador	1941, Chile	Final round	9 February 1941
19.	Juan Marvezzi	5	3', 17', 28', 39', 59'	Argentina	6–1	Ecuador	1941, Chile	Final round	16 February 1941
20.	Teodoro Fernández (II)	3	25', 32', 48'	Peru	4–0	Ecuador	1941, Chile	Final round	23 February 1941
21.	Sylvio Pirillo	3	23', 63', 86'	Brazil	6–1	Chile	1942, Uruguay	Final round	14 January 1942
22.	Severino Varela (II)	3	16', 24', 29'	Uruguay	7–0	Ecuador	1942, Uruguay	Final round	18 January 1942
23.	José Manuel Moreno	5	12', 16', 22', 32', 89'	Argentina	12–0	Ecuador	1942, Uruguay	Final round	22 January 1942
24.	Herminio Masantonio (II)	4	54', 65', 68', 70'	Argentina	12–0	Ecuador	1942, Uruguay	Final round	22 January 1942
25.	Sylvio Pirillo (II)	3	12', 29', 76'	Brazil	5–1	Ecuador	1942, Uruguay	Final round	31 January 1942
26.	Juan Alcántara	3	28', 59', 81'	Chile	6–3	Ecuador	1945, Chile	Final round	14 January 1945
27.	Guillermo Clavero	3	13', 27', 39'	Chile	5–0	Bolivia	1945, Chile	Final round	21 January 1945
28.	Atilio García	3	1', 60', 83'	Uruguay	5–1	Ecuador	1945, Chile	Final round	24 January 1945
29.	Norberto Doroteo Méndez	3	14', 20', 40'	Argentina	3–1	Brazil	1945, Chile	Final round	15 February 1945
30.	Ademir	3	3', 10', 75'	Brazil	9–2	Ecuador	1945, Chile	Final round	21 February 1945
31.	José María Medina	4	1', 25', 30', 78'	Uruguay	5–0	Bolivia	1946, Argentina	Final round	29 January 1946
32.	Zizinho	4	4', 41', 46', 71'	Brazil	5–1	Chile	1946, Argentina	Final round	2 February 1946
33.	René Pontoni	3	40', 50', 82'	Argentina	6–0	Paraguay	1947, Ecuador	Final round	2 December 1947
34.	Alfredo di Stéfano	3	30', 62', 75'	Argentina	6–0	Colombia	1947, Ecuador	Final round	18 December 1947
35.	Leocadio Marín	3	22', 58', 69'	Paraguay	4–0	Ecuador	1947, Ecuador	Final round	29 December 1947
36.	Nininho	3	16', 39', 86'	Brazil	10–1	Bolivia	1949, Brazil	Final round	10 April 1949
37.	Dionisio Arce	3	10', 39', 47'	Paraguay	4–2	Chile	1949, Brazil	Final round	27 April 1949
38.	Jorge Benítez	4	30', 40', 41', 89'	Paraguay	7–0	Bolivia	1949, Brazil	Final round	30 April 1949
39.	Ademir (II)	3	17', 27', 48'	Brazil	7–0	Paraguay	1949, Brazil	Playoff	11 May 1949
40.	Molina	3	5', 55', 67'	Chile	3–2	Uruguay	1953, Peru	Final round	1 March 1953
41.	Julinho	4	18', 20', 42', 52'	Brazil	8–1	Bolivia	1953, Peru	Final round	1 March 1953
42.	Enrique Hormazábal	3	27', 47', 53'	Chile	7–1	Ecuador	1955, Chile	Final round	27 February 1955
43.	Rodolfo Micheli	4	5', p. 18', 64', 83'	Argentina	5–3	Paraguay	1955, Chile	Final round	2 March 1955
44.	Ángel Labruna	3	39', 71', 87'	Argentina	6–1	Uruguay	1955, Chile	Final round	27 March 1955
45.	Javier Ambrois	4	26', p. 29', 57', 74'	Uruguay	5–2	Ecuador	1957, Peru	Final round	7 March 1957
46.	Humberto Maschio	4	p. 16', 23', p. 53', 85'	Argentina	8–2	Colombia	1957, Peru	Final round	13 March 1957
47.	Didí	3	20', 26', 44'	Brazil	4–2	Chile	1957, Peru	Final round	13 March 1957
48.	Javier Ambrois (II)	4	22', 48', 60', 75'	Uruguay	5–3	Peru	1957, Peru	Final round	23 March 1957
49.	Evaristo	5	41', 44', 45', 75', 86'	Brazil	9–0	Colombia	1957, Peru	Final round	24 March 1957
50.	Miguel Angel Loayza	3	4', 27', 42'	Peru	5–3	Uruguay	1959, Argentina	Final round	14 March 1959
51.	Cayetano Ré	3	1', 21', 50'	Paraguay	5–0	Bolivia	1959, Argentina	Final round	15 March 1959
52.	Paulo Valentim	3	62', 80', 89'	Brazil	3–1	Uruguay	1959, Argentina	Final round	26 March 1959
53.	Pelé	3	25', 60', 63'	Brazil	4–1	Paraguay	1959, Argentina	Final round	29 March 1959
−.	Paulo Pisaneschi	3	29', 39', 60'	Brazil	3–2	Paraguay	1959, Ecuador	Final round	5 December 1959
54.	José Sanfilippo	3	8', 57', p. 89'	Argentina	4–2	Paraguay	1959, Ecuador	Final round	9 December 1959
55.	José Sanfilippo (II)	3	27', 89', 90'	Argentina	4–1	Brazil	1959, Ecuador	Final round	22 December 1959
56.	Raúl Armando Savoy	3	34', 53', 90'	Argentina	4–2	Ecuador	1963, Bolivia	Final round	20 March 1963
57.	Luis Artime	3	18', 65', 88'	Argentina	5–1	Venezuela	1967, Uruguay	Final round	25 January 1967
58.	Leopoldo Luque	3	12', 34', 66'	Argentina	5–1	Venezuela	1975	First round	3 August 1975
59.	Daniel Killer	3	8', 41', 62'	Argentina	11–0	Venezuela	1975	First round	10 August 1975
60.	Arnoldo Iguarán	3	8', 34', 50'	Colombia	3–0	Paraguay	1987, Argentina	First round	5 July 1987
61.	Javier Saviola	3	64', 75', 79'	Argentina	6–1	Ecuador	2004, Peru	First round	7 July 2004
62.	Adriano	3	45', 54', 67'	Brazil	4–1	Costa Rica	2004, Peru	First round	11 July 2004
63.	Roque Santa Cruz	3	30', 46', 80'	Paraguay	5–0	Colombia	2007, Venezuela	First round	28 June 2007
64.	Robinho	3	p. 36', 84', 87'	Brazil	3–0	Chile	2007, Venezuela	First round	1 July 2007
65.	Paolo Guerrero	3	63', 89', 90+2'	Peru	4–1	Venezuela	2011, Argentina	Third-place match	23 July 2011
66.	Paolo Guerrero (II)	3	20', 23', 74'	Peru	3–1	Bolivia	2015, Chile	Quarter-finals	25 June 2015
67.	Philippe Coutinho	3	14', 29', 90+2'	Brazil	7–1	Haiti	2016, United States	First round	9 June 2016
68.	Lionel Messi	3	68', 78', 87'	Argentina	5–0	Panama	2016, United States	First round	10 June 2016
69.	Eduardo Vargas	4	44', 52', 57', 74'	Chile	7–0	Mexico	2016, United States	Quarter-finals	18 June 2016

== See also ==
- Copa América
- Copa América records and statistics
