= List of Uruguay national football team hat-tricks =

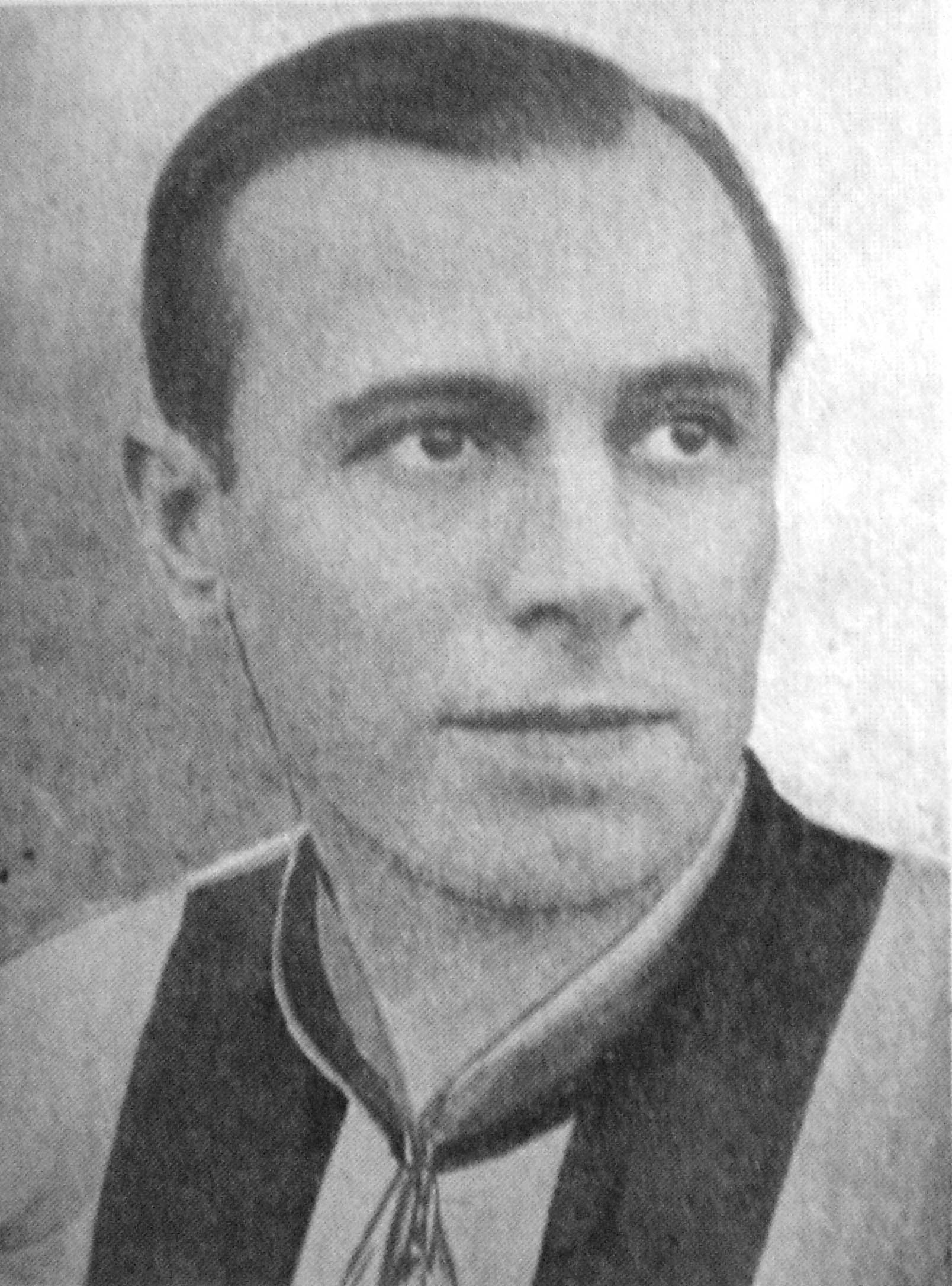
José Piendibene, first player to score a hat-trick for Uruguay.

Since Uruguay's first official international football match in 1902, there have been 33 occasions when a Uruguayan player has scored three or more goals (a hat-trick) in a game. The first hat-trick was scored by José Piendibene against Argentina in 1919. The record for most goals scored in an international match by a Uruguayan player is five, which has been achieved by Héctor Scarone against Bolivia in 1926.

With three hat-tricks, Pedro Petrone and Javier Ambrois shares the record for most international hat-tricks scored by a Uruguayan player. Petrone is also the only Uruguayan to score a hat-trick in Olympics. Pedro Cea (1930), Óscar Míguez (1950) and Carlos Borges (1954) are the only three Uruguayan players to score a hat-trick in a FIFA World Cup match. Last player to score a hat-trick for Uruguay is Darwin Núñez, who found the net three times in a friendly match against Mexico.

Uruguay have conceded 21 hat-tricks in their history, 10 of them in matches against Argentina. Last player to score a hat-trick against Uruguay is Brazilian midfielder Paulinho.

Note: Whenever scores and results are mentioned in this article, Uruguay's goal tally is given first.

== Hat-tricks for Uruguay ==
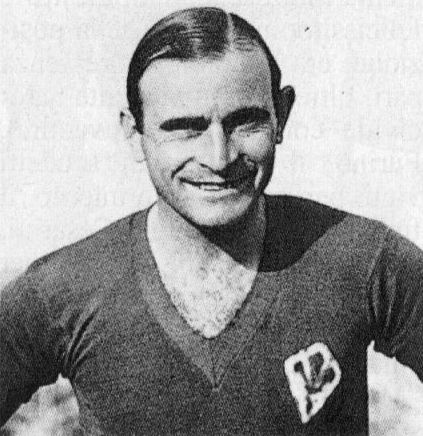
Pedro Petrone (in picture), along with Javier Ambrois holds the record for most international hat-tricks scored by a Uruguayan player.

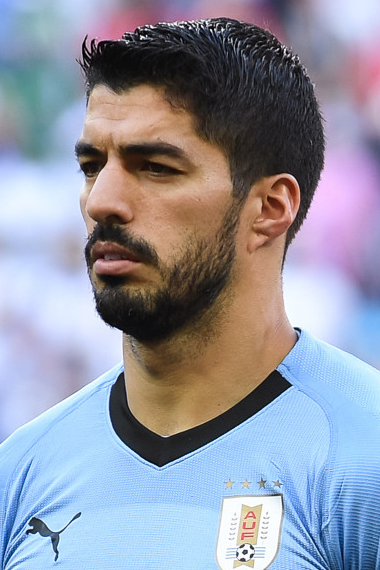
Luis Suárez, one among five players to score multiple hat-tricks for Uruguay.

| Date | Player | Goals | Opponent | Venue | Result | Competition | Ref(s) |
|---|---|---|---|---|---|---|---|
| 7 December 1919 | José Piendibene | 3 | Argentina | Parque Pereira, Montevideo | 4–2 | Friendly | |
| 2 November 1921 | Felipe Buffoni | 3 | Paraguay | Estadio Gran Parque Central, Montevideo | 4–2 | Friendly | |
| 19 October 1924 | Pedro Petrone | 3 | Chile | Estadio Gran Parque Central, Montevideo | 5–0 | 1924 South American Championship | |
| 28 October 1926 | Héctor Scarone | 5 | Bolivia | Estadio Campos de Sports de Ñuñoa, Santiago | 6–0 | 1926 South American Championship | |
| 1 November 1926 | Héctor Castro | 4 | Paraguay | Estadio Campos de Sports de Ñuñoa, Santiago | 6–1 | 1926 South American Championship | |
| 6 November 1927 | Roberto Figueroa | 3 | Bolivia | Estadio Nacional, Lima | 9–0 | 1927 South American Championship | |
| 6 November 1927 | Pedro Petrone | 3 | Bolivia | Estadio Nacional, Lima | 9–0 | 1927 South American Championship | |
| 3 June 1928 | Pedro Petrone | 3 | (West Germany) Germany | Olympic Stadium, Amsterdam | 4–1 | 1928 Summer Olympics | |
| 11 November 1929 | Lorenzo Fernández | 3 | Peru | Estadio Alvear y Tagle, Buenos Aires | 4–1 | 1929 South American Championship | |
| 27 July 1930 | Pedro Cea | 3 | (Socialist Federal Republic of Yugoslavia) Yugoslavia | Estadio Centenario, Montevideo | 6–1 | 1930 FIFA World Cup | |
| 22 January 1939 | Severino Varela | 3 | Ecuador | Estadio Nacional, Lima | 6–0 | 1939 South American Championship | |
| 9 February 1941 | Ismael Rivero | 3 | Ecuador | Estadio Nacional, Santiago | 6–0 | 1941 South American Championship | |
| 18 January 1942 | Severino Varela | 3 | Ecuador | Estadio Centenario, Montevideo | 7–0 | 1942 South American Championship | |
| 24 January 1945 | Atilio García | 3 | Ecuador | Estadio Nacional, Santiago | 5–1 | 1945 South American Championship | |
| 29 January 1946 | José María Medina | 4 | Bolivia | Estadio de Independiente, Avellaneda | 5–0 | 1946 South American Championship | |
| 2 July 1950 | Óscar Míguez | 3 | Bolivia | Estádio Independência, Belo Horizonte | 8–0 | 1950 FIFA World Cup | |
| 30 March 1952 | Óscar Míguez | 3 | Peru | Estadio Nacional, Santiago | 5–2 | Friendly | |
| 6 April 1952 | Julio Abbadie | 3 | Panama | Estadio Nacional, Santiago | 6–1 | Friendly | |
| 5 June 1954 | Javier Ambrois | 3 | (Saar Protectorate) Saarland | Ludwigsparkstadion, Saarbrücken | 7–1 | Friendly | |
| 19 June 1954 | Carlos Borges | 3 | Scotland | St. Jakob Stadium, Basel | 7–0 | 1954 FIFA World Cup | |
| 7 March 1957 | Javier Ambrois | 4 | Ecuador | Estadio Nacional, Lima | 5–2 | 1957 South American Championship | |
| 23 March 1957 | Javier Ambrois | 4 | Peru | Estadio Nacional, Lima | 5–3 | 1957 South American Championship | |
| 23 May 1965 | Héctor Silva | 3 | Venezuela | Estadio Centenario, Montevideo | 5–0 | 1966 FIFA World Cup qualification | |
| 18 December 1980 | Rubén Paz | 3 | Switzerland | Estadio Luis Tróccoli, Montevideo | 4–0 | Friendly | |
| 10 February 1985 | Amaro Nadal | 3 | Paraguay | Estadio Defensores del Chaco, Asunción | 3–1 | Friendly | |
| 15 August 2003 | Martín Ligüera | 3 | Iraq | Azadi Stadium, Tehran | 5–2 | Friendly | |
| 4 September 2005 | Marcelo Zalayeta | 3 | Colombia | Estadio Centenario, Montevideo | 3–2 | 2006 FIFA World Cup qualification | |
| 17 June 2008 | Diego Forlán | 3 | Peru | Estadio Centenario, Montevideo | 6–0 | 2010 FIFA World Cup qualification | |
| 8 October 2010 | Luis Suárez | 3 | Indonesia | Gelora Bung Karno Stadium, Jakarta | 7–1 | Friendly | |
| 8 October 2010 | Edinson Cavani | 3 | Indonesia | Gelora Bung Karno Stadium, Jakarta | 7–1 | Friendly | |
| 11 November 2011 | Luis Suárez | 4 | Chile | Estadio Centenario, Montevideo | 4–0 | 2014 FIFA World Cup qualification | |
| 23 June 2013 | Abel Hernández | 4 | (French Polynesia) Tahiti | Arena Pernambuco, Recife | 8–0 | 2013 FIFA Confederations Cup | |
| 5 June 2024 | Darwin Núñez | 3 | Mexico | Empower Field at Mile High, Denver | 4–0 | Friendly | |

== Hat-tricks conceded by Uruguay ==
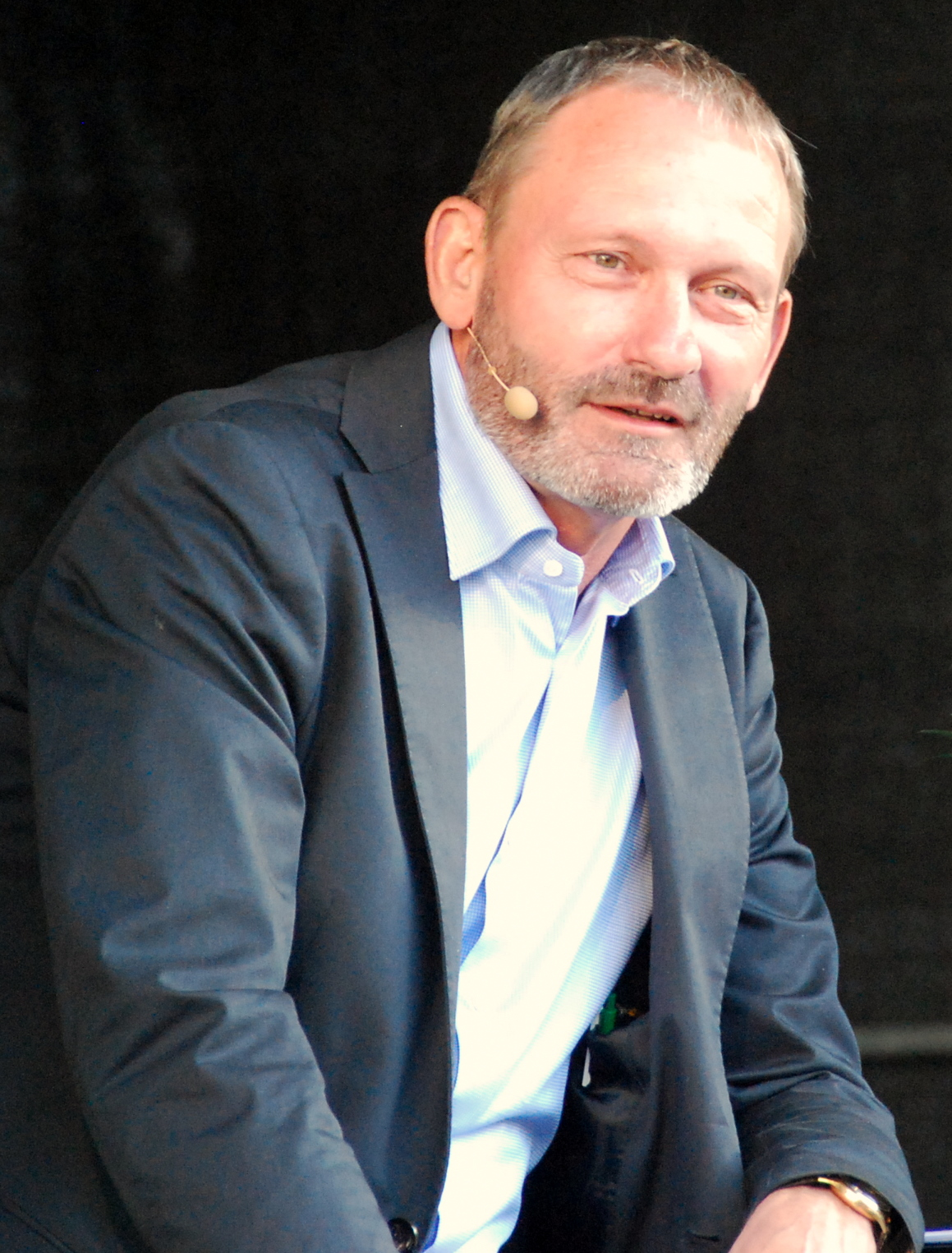
Danish striker Preben Elkjær is the only player to score a World Cup hat-trick against Uruguay.

| Date | Player | Goals | Opponent | Venue | Result | Competition | Ref(s) |
|---|---|---|---|---|---|---|---|
| 13 July 1913 | Carlos Guidi | 3 | Argentina | Estadio Gran Parque Central, Montevideo | 5–4 | Friendly | |
| 15 August 1913 | Maximiliano Susán | 4 | Argentina | Estadio Racing Club, Avellaneda | 0–4 | Friendly | |
| 1 October 1916 | Marius Hiller | 3 | Argentina | Estadio Racing Club, Avellaneda | 2–7 | Friendly | |
| 19 October 1919 | Julio Libonatti | 3 | Argentina | Estadio G.E.B.A., Buenos Aires | 1–6 | Friendly | |
| 5 February 1933 | Roberto Cherro | 4 | Argentina | Estadio de Independiente, Avellaneda | 1–4 | Friendly | |
| 11 November 1937 | Herminio Masantonio | 3 | Argentina | Estadio de Independiente, Avellaneda | 1–5 | Friendly | |
| 29 January 1944 | René Pontoni | 3 | Argentina | Estadio Gasómetro, Buenos Aires | 2–6 | Friendly | |
| 18 May 1944 | Jair da Rosa Pinto | 3 | Brazil | Pacaembu Stadium, São Paulo | 0–4 | Friendly | |
| 1 March 1953 | Francisco Molina | 3 | Chile | Estadio Nacional, Lima | 2–3 | 1953 South American Championship | |
| 27 March 1955 | Ángel Labruna | 3 | Argentina | Estadio Nacional, Santiago | 1–6 | 1955 South American Championship | |
| 14 July 1957 | Florencio Amarilla | 3 | Paraguay | Estadio Defensores del Chaco, Asunción | 0–5 | FIFA World Cup qualifiers | |
| 14 March 1959 | Miguel Ángel Loayza | 3 | Peru | El Monumental, Buenos Aires | 3–5 | 1959 South American Championship (Argentina) | |
| 26 March 1959 | Paulo Valentim | 3 | Brazil | El Monumental, Buenos Aires | 1–3 | 1959 South American Championship (Argentina) | |
| 17 August 1960 | José Sanfilippo | 3 | Argentina | El Monumental, Buenos Aires | 0–4 | Friendly | |
| 27 April 1962 | Aleksei Mamykin | 3 | Soviet Union | Central Lenin Stadium, Moscow | 0–5 | Friendly | |
| 26 June 1966 | José Torres | 3 | Portugal | Estádio Nacional, Oeiras | 0–3 | Friendly | |
| 8 June 1986 | Preben Elkjær | 3 | Denmark | Estadio Neza 86, Nezahualcóyotl | 1–6 | 1986 FIFA World Cup | |
| 16 November 1997 | Ariel Graziani | 3 | Ecuador | Estadio Domingo Burgueño, Maldonado | 5–3 | 1998 FIFA World Cup qualification | |
| 10 September 2003 | José Cardozo | 3 | Paraguay | Estadio Defensores del Chaco, Asunción | 1–4 | 2006 FIFA World Cup qualification | |
| 16 October 2012 | Carlos Saucedo | 3 | Bolivia | Estadio Hernando Siles, La Paz | 1–4 | 2014 FIFA World Cup qualification | |
| 23 March 2017 | Paulinho | 3 | Brazil | Estadio Centenario, Montevideo | 1–4 | 2018 FIFA World Cup qualification | |
