= Segundo Luna =

Argentine footballer (1902–??)

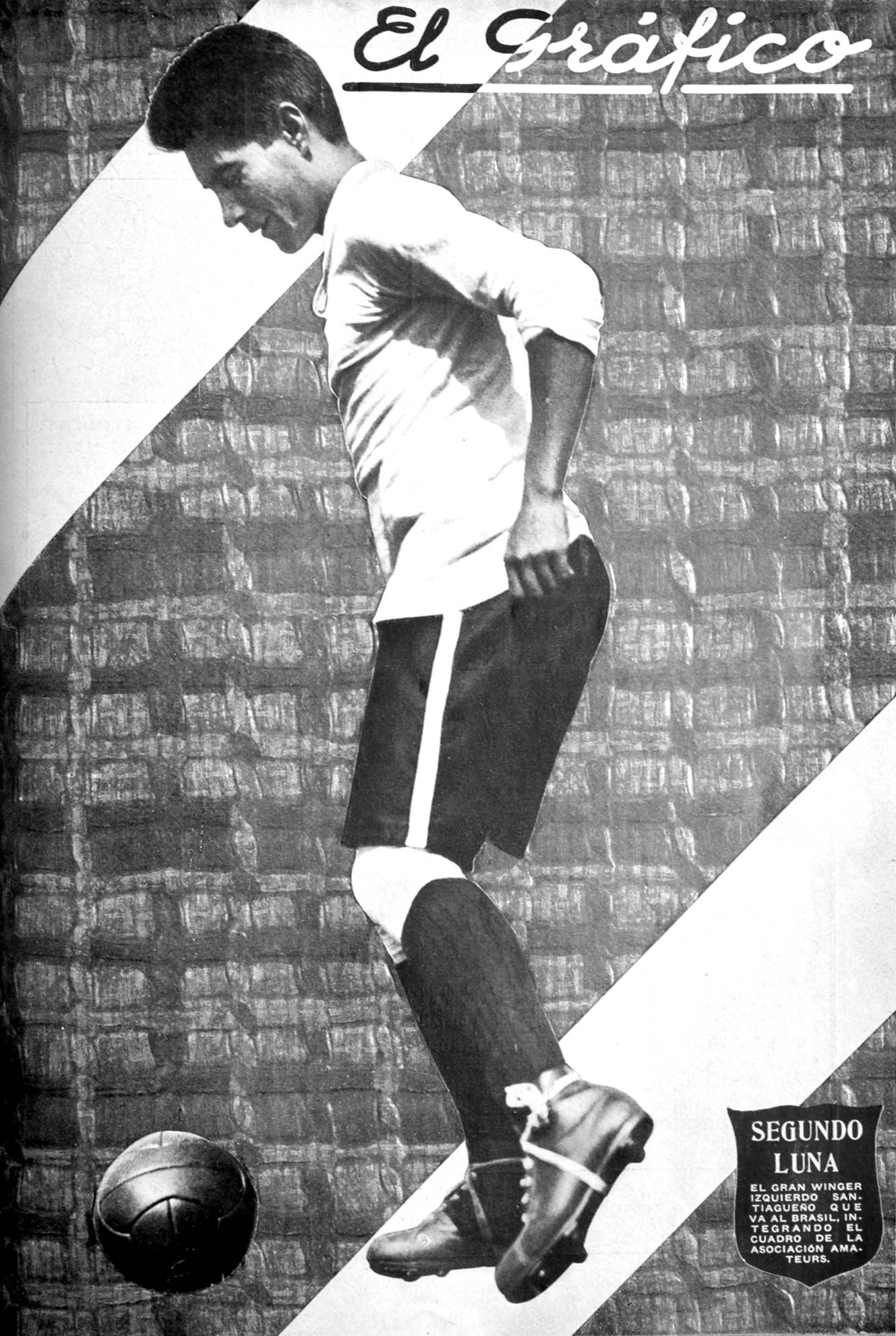
- Segundo Luna in 1926

Personal information
- Full name: Segundo Nepomuceno Gómez
- Date of birth: 20 April 1902
- Place of birth: Santiago del Estero, Argentina
- Position: Striker

Senior career*
Years	Team	Apps	(Gls)
?–1928	Mitre		
1929–1930	Newell's Old Boys		
1931	Rosario Central		

International career
1927–1928	Argentina	7	(3)
- * Club domestic league appearances and goals

Medal record

Men's football

Representing Argentina

Olympic Games
Silver medal – second place	1928 Amsterdam	Team competition

Segundo Luna (born 20 April 1902) was an Argentine footballer, born in Santiago del Estero, Argentina. He was the first Santiagueño (person who was born in Santiago del Estero) to play in Argentina's national football team as well as the first to play in an international tournament. Luna's team finished second in the Athletic Club Students Cultural Football League. He then joined the international football team in 1927, the year before the Olympics in Amsterdam. His first tournament was the 1927 South American Championship, in Lima, Peru, where Argentina qualified for the 1928 Olympics. The name 'Segundo Luna' means 'Second Moon' in Spanish.

== The Copa De America ==
Segundo Luna scored his first international goal on 1 October 1927, against Bolivia. Luna scored the first goal after 18 minutes in what would be a 7–1 win. He scored another goal in that match, which was Argentina's sixth. This was after 56 minutes. He next scored on 20 November, in a 3–2 win against Uruguay. He scored his team's second goal (to make it 2–1) after 70 minutes. Luna was the joint-top goalscorer of the competition, along with Alfredo Carricaberry (Argentina), Roberto Figueroa (Uruguay), Héctor Scarone (Uruguay) and Pedro Petrone (Uruguay). They scored 3 goals each.

== 1928 Olympics ==
Argentina came second in the 1928 Olympics. Luna was part of the squad, but he did not play in any matches. They played the semi-final against Egypt, who had surprisingly beaten Turkey and Portugal in earlier rounds. Luna's team were dominant and won 6–0. The final was against Uruguay and finished 1–1 after 30 minutes of extra time. A replay was called, and it was 1–1 at half time. Argentina conceded the tournament-winning goal in the 68th minute.
