= Domingo Tejera =

Uruguayan footballer (1899-1969)

Personal information
- Full name: Domingo Tejera
- Date of birth: July 9, 1899
- Place of birth: Uruguay
- Date of death: July 18, 1969 (aged 70)
- Position: Defender

Senior career*
Years	Team	Apps	(Gls)
	Montevideo Wanderers	200+	

International career
1922–1932	Uruguay	17	(0)
Medal record
Men's football
Representing Uruguay
Olympic Games
Gold medal – first place	1928 Amsterdam	Team
FIFA World Cup
Winner	1930 Uruguay
South American Championship
Winner	1920 Chile
Winner	1926 Chile
Runner-up	1927 Peru
Third place	1922 Brazil
- * Club domestic league appearances and goals

Domingo Tejera (July 9, 1899 – July 18, 1969) was a football player from Uruguay. He was born in Montevideo. He was part of the Uruguay team that won the gold medal at the 1928 Summer Olympics, and the 1930 FIFA World Cup held in Uruguay.

Tejera played club football for Montevideo Wanderers. He made over 200 appearances and won the Uruguayan league twice with Montevideo Wanderers. Tejera made 17 appearances for the national team from 1922 to 1932. He won the 1920 South American Championship prior to making his international debut, a tournament in which he was part of the squad but did not feature in any matches.

World Cup-winners status
Preceded by Héctor Scarone	Oldest Living Player; 4 April 1967 – 30 June 1969	Succeeded by Santos Urdinarán
