= Venancio Bartibás =

Uruguayan footballer (1906-1977)

Personal information
- Date of birth: 18 May 1906
- Place of birth: Montevideo, Uruguay
- Date of death: July 1977
- Place of death: Montevideo, Uruguay
- Position: Defender

International career
Years	Team	Apps	(Gls)
1927	Uruguay	1	(0)
Medal record
Men's football
Representing Uruguay
Olympic Games
Gold medal – first place	1928 Amsterdam	Team
South American Championship
Runner-up	1927 Peru

Venancio Bartibás (18 May 1906 – July 1977) was a Uruguayan footballer who played as a defender. He played one match for the Uruguay national team in 1927. He was an unused member of Uruguay team which won gold medal at 1928 Olympics.
