= Mario Alborta =

Bolivian footballer (1910-1976)

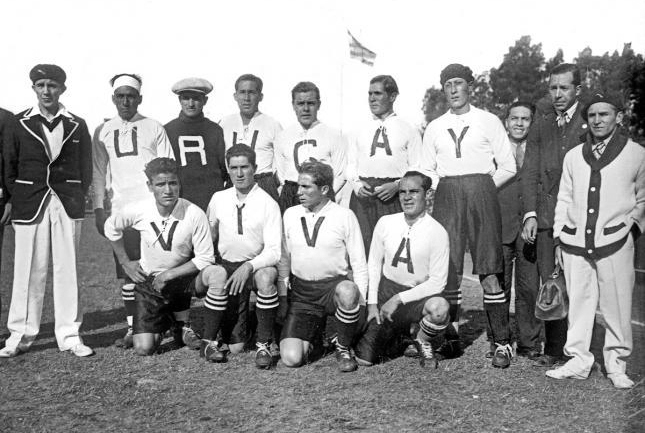

Personal information
- Full name: Mario Mauricio Alborta Velasco
- Date of birth: September 19, 1910
- Place of birth: La Paz, Bolivia
- Date of death: January 1, 1976 (aged 65)
- Height: 1.72 m (5 ft 8 in)
- Position: Forward

Senior career*
Years	Team	Apps	(Gls)
1925–1939	Bolívar		

International career
1926–1938	Bolivia	14	(2)
- * Club domestic league appearances and goals

Mario Mauricio Alborta Velasco (19 September 1910 – 1 January 1976, in Bolivia) was a Bolivian football forward.

== Career ==
During his career he participated in the 1926 and 1927 South American Championship, and made two appearances for the Bolivia national team at the 1930 FIFA World Cup. His career in club football was spent in Club Bolivar between 1925 and 1939

== Achievements ==
Liga de Fútbol Amateur Boliviano: 3

1932, 1937, 1939
