= Jorge Sarmiento =

Peruvian footballer (1900-1957)

Jorge Koochoi
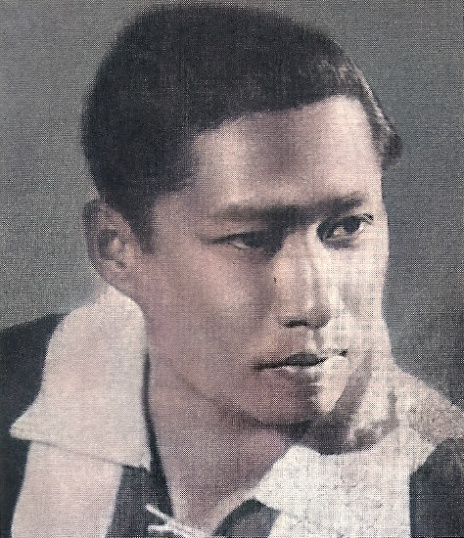
- Jorge Koochoi in 1928

Personal information
- Full name: Jorge Sarmiento Koochoi
- Date of birth: 2 November 1900
- Place of birth: Lima, Peru
- Date of death: 20 February 1957 (aged 56)
- Place of death: Lima, Peru
- Position: Forward

Senior career*
Years	Team	Apps	(Gls)
- José Gálvez
- Alianza Lima

International career
- Peru
- * Club domestic league appearances and goals

Jorge Sarmiento Koochoi (2 November 1900 - 20 February 1957) was a Peruvian football forward who played for Peru in the 1930 FIFA World Cup. He also played for Alianza Lima.
