= Fausto Batignani =

Uruguayan football player (1903–1975)

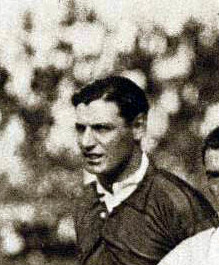
- Batignani in 1926

Personal information
- Date of birth: 2 July 1903
- Place of birth: Montevideo, Uruguay
- Date of death: 2 November 1975 (aged 72)
- Place of death: Montevideo, Uruguay
- Position: Goalkeeper

Senior career*
Years	Team	Apps	(Gls)
- Liverpool Montevideo
- Nacional

International career
1922–1928	Uruguay	11	(0)
Medal record
Men's football
Representing Uruguay
Olympic Games
Gold medal – first place	1928 Amsterdam	Team
South American Championship
Winner	1926 Chile
Third place	1922 Brazil
- * Club domestic league appearances and goals

Fausto Batignani (2 July 1903 – 2 November 1975) was a Uruguayan footballer who played as a goalkeeper. He played eleven matches for the Uruguay national team between 1922 and 1928.

== Career statistics ==
=== International ===
National team	Year	Apps	Goals
Uruguay	1922	5	0
Uruguay	1923	0	0
Uruguay	1924	0	0
Uruguay	1925	0	0
Uruguay	1926	4	0
Uruguay	1927	0	0
Uruguay	1928	2	0
Total		11	0
