= Adhemar Canavesi =

Uruguayan football player (1903-1984)

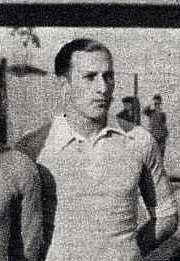

Personal information
- Date of birth: 18 August 1903
- Place of birth: Montevideo, Uruguay
- Date of death: 14 November 1984 (aged 81)
- Place of death: Montevideo, Uruguay
- Position: Defender

Senior career*
Years	Team	Apps	(Gls)
- Bella Vista
- Peñarol

International career
1925–1928	Uruguay	9	(0)
Medal record
Men's football
Representing Uruguay
Olympic Games
Gold medal – first place	1928 Amsterdam	Team
South American Championship
Runner-up	1927 Peru
- * Club domestic league appearances and goals

Adhemar Canavesi (18 August 1903 – 14 November 1984) was a Uruguayan footballer who played as a defender. He was a member of the Uruguayan team which won gold medal at the 1928 Olympics. After beginning his club career with Bella Vista, he moved to Peñarol in 1928.

== Career statistics ==
=== International ===
National team	Year	Apps	Goals
Uruguay	1925	5	0
Uruguay	1926	0	0
Uruguay	1927	3	0
Uruguay	1928	1	0
Total		9	0
