= Demetrio Neyra =

Peruvian footballer (1908-1957)

Personal information
- Full name: Demetrio Neyra Ramos
- Date of birth: 15 December 1908
- Place of birth: Peru
- Date of death: 27 September 1957 (aged 48)
- Height: 1.66 m (5 ft 5 1/2 in)
- Position: Forward

Senior career*
Years	Team	Apps	(Gls)
- Alianza Lima

International career
- Peru
- * Club domestic league appearances and goals

Demetrio Neyra Ramos (15 December 1908 - 27 September 1957) was a Peruvian football forward who played for Peru in the 1930 FIFA World Cup. He also played for Alianza Lima.
