= Juan Arremón =

Uruguayan footballer (1899-1979)

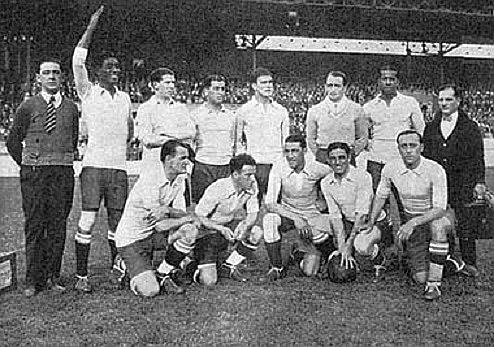

Personal information
- Full name: Juan Pedro Arremón
- Date of birth: 8 February 1899
- Date of death: 15 June 1979 (aged 80)
- Position: Winger

Senior career*
| Years | Team | Apps | (Gls) |
- Peñarol

International career
| 1923–1929 | Uruguay | 14 | (1) |

Managerial career
- 1943: Peñarol
- * Club domestic league appearances and goals

Olympic medal record

Men's Football
| Gold medal – first place | 1928 Amsterdam | Team competition |

Juan Pedro Arremón (8 February 1899 – 15 June 1979) was a Uruguayan football player. He competed in the 1928 Summer Olympics and played club football for Peñarol.

Arremón was a member of the Uruguay national team, which won the gold medal in the 1928 Olympic football tournament. He played 14 matches for the Uruguay national team, scoring one goal.

He coached Peñarol in 1943.
