= José Vanzzino =

Uruguayan footballer (1893-1977)

José Vanzino
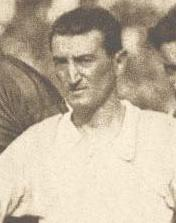

Personal information
- Full name: José Vanzino Gabito
- Date of birth: 5 July 1893
- Place of birth: Montevideo, Uruguay
- Date of death: 29 June 1977 (aged 83)
- Position: Midfielder

International career
| Years | Team | Apps | (Gls) |
| 1913–1927 | Uruguay | 38 | (0) |

José Vanzino Gabito (born 5 July 1893 – 29 June 1977) was a Uruguayan footballer. He played in 23 matches for the Uruguay national football team from 1913 to 1927. He was also part of Uruguay's squad for the 1916 South American Championship.
