= José María Medina (footballer) =

Uruguayan footballer (1921–2005)

Personal information
- Date of birth: 13 February 1921
- Place of birth: Paysandú, Uruguay
- Date of death: 16 October 2005 (aged 84)
- Place of death: Montevideo, Uruguay
- Position: Forward

Senior career*
Years	Team	Apps	(Gls)
1939/44 1949/52	Wanderers; Wanderers	211	(92)
1945—1946	Club Nacional	na	(na)
1947/48	Newell's Old Boys	na	(na)

International career
1941–1947	Uruguay	15	(11)
- * Club domestic league appearances and goals

José María Medina (13 February 1921 – 16 October 2005) was a Uruguayan footballer who played as a forward. He played in fifteen matches for the Uruguay national football team from 1941 to 1947, scoring 11 goals. He was also part of Uruguay's squad for the 1941 and 1946 South American Championships, finishing as runner-up in the former edition of the tournament and as top-scorer in the latter edition (with Uruguay placing fourth).

== Career statistics ==
=== International ===
Appearances and goals by national team and year
National team	Year	Apps	Goals
Uruguay	1941	1	0
Uruguay	1943	2	2
Uruguay	1944	2	0
Uruguay	1945	1	0
Uruguay	1946	7	8
Uruguay	1947	2	1
Total		15	11
