= 1927 South American Championship =

Football tournament

Tournament details
- Host country: Peru
- Dates: 30 October – 27 November 1927
- Teams: 4
- Venue(s): Estadio Nacional, Lima

Final positions
- Champions: Argentina (3rd title)
- Runners-up: Uruguay
- Third place: Peru
- Fourth place: Bolivia

Tournament statistics
- Matches played: 6
- Goals scored: 37 (6.17 per match)
- Top scorer(s): (Argentina) Alfredo Carricaberry (Uruguay) Roberto Figueroa (Argentina) Segundo Luna (Uruguay) Pedro Petrone (Uruguay) Héctor Scarone (3 goals each)

The 1927 South American Championship (Spanish: Campeonato Sudamericano 1927) was the 11th international association football championship for members of the Confederación Sudamericana de Fútbol (CONMEBOL). Hosted by Peru, the competition ran from 30 October – 27 November 1927 and was contested by the national teams of Argentina, Bolivia, Peru and Uruguay. For the first time, the competition was used as a qualifier for the Summer Olympics.

Argentina won the competition for the third time after defeating Peru 5–1 in the final match of the round-robin tournament. Winners Argentina and runners-up Uruguay qualified to compete at the 1928 Summer Olympics.

== Background ==
In 1910, the Asociación del Fútbol Argentino (AFA) organised a tournament to mark the 100th anniversary of the May Revolution. The Copa Centenario Revolución de Mayo was contested by the national teams of Argentina, Chile and Uruguay and is considered to be a precursor to the South American Championship. Six years later, the AFA organised a second tournament, this time to celebrate the centenary of the Argentine Declaration of Independence. Alongside the three who had contested the Copa Centenario Revolución de Mayo, Brazil were invited to compete and the South American Championship was born. During the competition, the four associations of the competing teams met on 9 July 1916 and founded the Confederación Sudamericana de Fútbol (CONMEBOL).

Uruguay were the defending champions having won the 1926 edition after defeating Paraguay 6–1 in their final match of the competition. Uruguay were also the most successful team in the history of the competition having won the six of the first 10 editions.

Brazil, Chile and Paraguay withdrew prior to the start of the competition so only four of the seven CONMEBOL members would compete.

The Argentina team departed from Retiro railway station, Buenos Aires as they travelled Valparaíso, Chile on their way to Peru. There, they joined the Uruguay team and boarded a ship to the port of Callao, Lima. They arrived in Peru after eight days.

== Format ==
The tournament was played as a round-robin where each team would play all of the others once. The winner would be decided by the total number of points obtained across all matches played. The winners and runners-up of the tournament would qualify for the 1928 Summer Olympics.

=== Participants ===
- Argentina
- Bolivia
- Peru
- Uruguay

== Venue ==
All matches were held at the Estadio Nacional in Lima.

Lima
Estadio Nacional
Capacity: 40,000
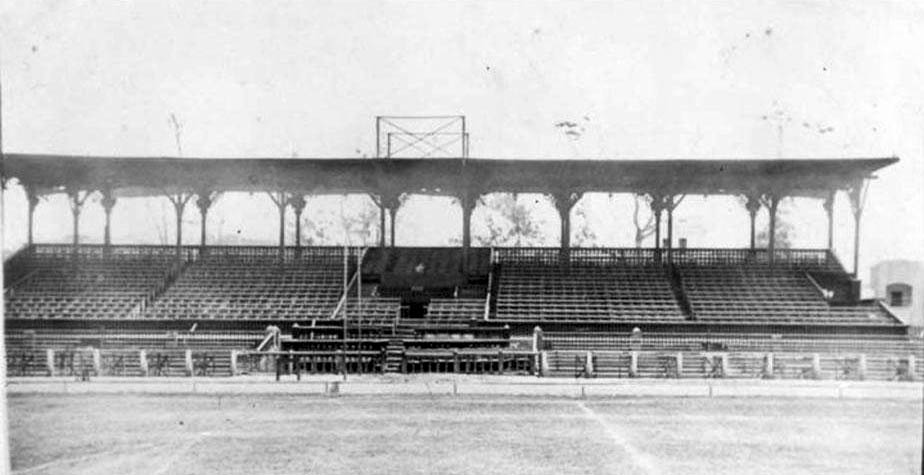

== Summary ==
The competition began on 30 October when Argentina defeated Bolivia 7–1. Two days later, defending champions Uruguay began the tournament with a 4–0 win against Peru. On 6 November, Pedro Petrone and Roberto Figueroa both scored hat-tricks as Uruguay won 9–0 against Bolivia.

A week later, Peru defeated Bolivia 3–2. In their last match on 20 November, Uruguay narrowly lost 3–2 to Argentina which gave Argentina the opportunity to win the championships if they avoided defeat against Peru in the final match of the competition. Despite being pegged back early, Argentina ran out 5–1 winners against Peru on 27 November as they won the competition for the third time. The result also meant that Argentina and Uruguay would qualify for the 1928 Summer Olympics.

== Table ==
Pos	Team	Pld	W	D	L	GF	GA	GD	Pts	Qualification
1	Argentina	3	3	0	0	15	4	+11	6	Qualification for 1928 Summer Olympics
2	Uruguay	3	2	0	1	15	3	+12	4	Qualification for 1928 Summer Olympics
3	Peru	3	1	0	2	4	11	−7	2	
4	Bolivia	3	0	0	3	3	19	−16	0	

== Results ==
30 October 1927

Argentina	7–1	Bolivia
Luna 18', 56'; Carricaberry 20', 36'; Recanatini 24' (pen.); Seoane 29', 79'		Alborta 42'

Estadio Nacional, Lima
Referee: Benjamín Fuentes (Peru)

1 November 1927

Uruguay	4–0	Peru
Ulloa 49' (o.g.); Sacco 52', 71'; Castro 75'

Estadio Nacional, Lima
Referee: Consolato Nay Foino (Argentina)

6 November 1927

Uruguay	9–0	Bolivia
Petrone 18', 65', 81'; Figueroa 19', 67', 69'; Arremón 43'; Castro 68'; Scarone 86'

Estadio Nacional, Lima
Referee: Benjamín Fuentes (Peru)

13 November 1927

Peru	3–2	Bolivia
Neyra 31'; Sarmiento 41'; Montellanos 43'		Bustamante 13', 14'

Estadio Nacional, Lima
Referee: Alberto Parodi (Chile)

20 November 1927

Argentina	3–2	Uruguay
Recanatini 56' (pen.); Luna 70'; Canavesi 85' (o.g.)		Scarone 33', 79'

Estadio Nacional, Lima
Referee: David Thurner (England)

27 November 1927

Argentina	5–1	Peru
Ferreira 1', 30'; Maglio 22', 25'; Carricaberry 38'		Villanueva 3'

Estadio Nacional, Lima
Referee: Victorio Gariboni (Bolivia)

== Goalscorers ==
There were 37 goals scored in 6 matches, for an average of 6.17 goals per match.

3 goals

- (Argentina) Alfredo Carricaberry
- (Argentina) Segundo Luna
- (Uruguay) Roberto Figueroa
- (Uruguay) Pedro Petrone
- (Uruguay) Héctor Scarone

2 goals

- (Argentina) Manuel Ferreira
- (Argentina) Juan Maglio
- (Argentina) Humberto Recanattini
- (Argentina) Manuel Seoane
- (Bolivia) José Bustamante
- (Uruguay) Héctor Castro
- (Uruguay) Antonio Sacco

1 goal

- (Bolivia) Mario Alborta
- (Peru) Alberto Montellanos
- (Peru) Demetrio Neyra
- (Peru) Jorge Sarmiento
- (Peru) Alejandro Villanueva
- (Uruguay) Juan Arremón

1 own goal

- (Peru) Santiago Ulloa (against Uruguay)
- (Uruguay) Canavesi (against Argentina)
