= José Pérez (Uruguayan footballer) =

Uruguayan footballer (1897-1920)

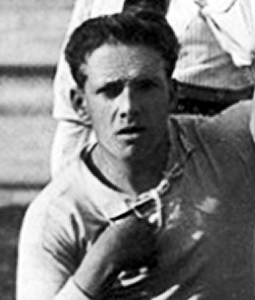

Personal information
- Date of birth: 30 November 1897
- Date of death: 5 December 1920 (aged 23)
- Position: Forward

International career
| Years | Team | Apps | (Gls) |
| 1913–1920 | Uruguay | 30 | (3) |

José Pérez (30 November 1897 – 5 December 1920) was a Uruguayan footballer. He played in 30 matches for the Uruguay national football team from 1913 to 1920. He was also part of Uruguay's squad for the 1916 South American Championship.
