= Héctor Castro =

Uruguayan footballer and coach (1904-1960)

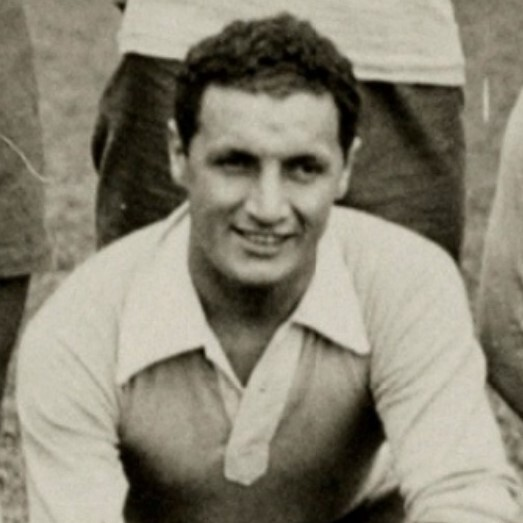
- Castro in 1928

Personal information
- Full name: Agustín Héctor Castro Rodríguez
- Date of birth: 29 November 1904
- Place of birth: Montevideo, Uruguay
- Date of death: 15 September 1960 (aged 55)
- Place of death: Montevideo, Uruguay
- Position: Forward

Youth career
- 1921–1924: Athletic Club Lito

Senior career*
Years	Team	Apps	(Gls)
1923–1932	Nacional	165	(99)
1932–1933	Estudiantes	31	(9)
1933–1936	Nacional	231	(149)

International career
1923–1935	Uruguay	25	(18)

Managerial career
- 1939–1943: Nacional
- 1952: Nacional
- 1959: Uruguay
Medal record
Men's football
Representing Uruguay
Olympic Games
Gold medal – first place	1928 Amsterdam	Team
FIFA World Cup
Winner	1930 Uruguay
South American Championship
Winner	1926 Chile
Winner	1935 Peru
Runner-up	1927 Peru
Third place	1929 Argentina
- * Club domestic league appearances and goals

Agustín Héctor Castro Rodríguez (29 November 1904 – 15 September 1960) was a Uruguayan football player and coach. He scored Uruguay's first ever goal in a World Cup against Peru at the inaugural 1930 FIFA World Cup, which they would go on to win.

== Early life ==
Castro was born in Montevideo. When he was 13, he accidentally amputated his right forearm while using an electric saw, which gave origin to his nickname, El manco (meaning "the one-armed", or "the maimed").

== Playing career ==
=== International career ===
Castro made his debut for the Uruguay national football team in November 1923. He played his final match for la Celeste in August 1935 having played 25 times, scoring 18 goals.

==== 1928 Olympics ====
Playing for Uruguay at the 1928 Olympic Games Castro won a gold medal.

==== 1930 FIFA World Cup ====
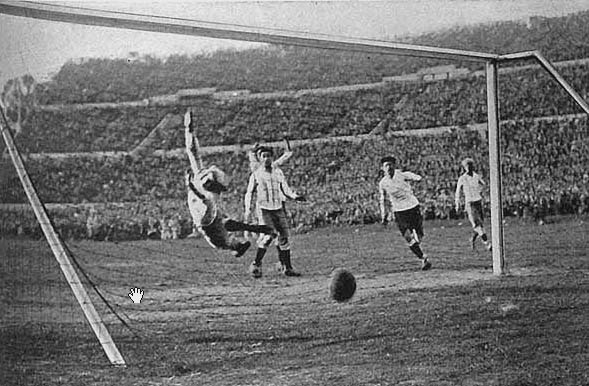
Castro scoring Uruguay's fourth goal in the 1930 World Cup Final

Castro was in the Uruguay squad for the inaugural 1930 FIFA World Cup. He scored Uruguay's first ever goal at a World Cup and the first at the Estadio Centenario, in their opening group game against Peru on 18 July 1930. He also scored their fourth goal in the final, a 4–2 win against Argentina.

==== South American Championship ====
Castro played in South American Championship-winning teams in 1926 and 1935.

==== International goals ====
Uruguay's goal tally first

#	Date	Venue	Opponent	Score	Result	Competition
1.	25 November 1923	Estadio Pocitos, Montevideo, Uruguay	Chile	1–0	2–1	Friendly
2.	8 December 1923	Estadio Racing Club, Buenos Aires, Argentina	Argentina	1–1	3–2	Copa Ministro de Relaciones Exteriores
3.	8 December 1923	Estadio Racing Club, Buenos Aires, Argentina	Argentina	3–2	3–2	Copa Ministro de Relaciones Exteriores
4.	17 October 1926	Estadio Sport de Ñuñoa, Santiago, Chile	Chile	2–0	3–1	1926 South American Championship
5.	24 October 1926	Estadio Sport de Ñuñoa, Santiago, Chile	Argentina	2–0	2–0	1926 South American Championship
6.	1 November 1926	Estadio Sport de Ñuñoa, Santiago, Chile	Paraguay	1–0	6–1	1926 South American Championship
7.	1 November 1926	Estadio Sport de Ñuñoa, Santiago, Chile	Paraguay	2–0	6–1	1926 South American Championship
8.	1 November 1926	Estadio Sport de Ñuñoa, Santiago, Chile	Paraguay	3–0	6–1	1926 South American Championship
9.	1 November 1926	Estadio Sport de Ñuñoa, Santiago, Chile	Paraguay	5–1	6–1	1926 South American Championship
10.	1 November 1927	Estadio Nacional, Lima, Peru	Peru	4–0	4–0	1927 South American Championship
11.	6 November 1927	Estadio Nacional, Lima, Peru	Bolivia	6–0	9–0	1927 South American Championship
12.	10 December 1927	Viña del Mar, Chile	Chile	2–2	3–2	Friendly
13.	3 June 1928	Olympic Stadium, Amsterdam, Netherlands	Germany	1–0	4–1	1928 Summer Olympics
14.	20 September 1929	Estadio Gran Parque Central, Montevideo, Uruguay	Argentina	1–0	2–1	1929 Copa Newton
15.	18 July 1930	Estadio Centenario, Montevideo, Uruguay	Peru	1–0	1–0	1930 FIFA World Cup
16.	30 July 1930	Estadio Centenario, Montevideo, Uruguay	Argentina	4–2	4–2	1930 FIFA World Cup final
17.	13 January 1935	Estadio Nacional, Lima, Peru	Peru	1–0	1–0	1935 South American Championship
18.	27 January 1935	Estadio Nacional, Lima, Peru	Argentina	1–0	3–0	1935 South American Championship

== Coaching career ==
After retiring as a player, Castro worked as a football coach with Nacional. He won the Uruguayan championship in 1940, 1941, 1942, 1943, and again in 1952.

== Later life and death ==
Castro died in 1960 at the age of fifty five.

== Honours ==
=== As a player ===
- FIFA World Cup: 1930
- Copa América: 1926, 1935
- Summer Olympics Gold Medal: 1928

=== As a coach ===
- Uruguayan Championship: 1940, 1941, 1942, 1943, 1952

=== As an assistant coach ===
- Uruguayan Championship: 1939

Castro was assistant coach to William Reaside in 1939 but was coach in the finals for that year's tournament. Therefore, he was Nacional's coach at all five years of the Quinquenio de Oro's closing games.
