= Roberto Figueroa =

Uruguayan footballer (1904-1989)

Personal information
- Full name: Roberto Figueroa
- Date of birth: 20 March 1904
- Place of birth: Montevideo, Uruguay
- Date of death: 24 January 1989 (aged 84)
- Position: Midfielder

Senior career*
Years	Team	Apps	(Gls)
1921–1927	Rampla Juniors		
1928–1933	Montevideo Wanderers		

International career
1921–1933	Uruguay	9	(6)
Medal record
Men's Football
Representing Uruguay
Olympic Games
Gold medal – first place	1928 Amsterdam	Team competition
South American Championship
Runner-up	1927 Peru	National Team
- * Club domestic league appearances and goals

Roberto Figueroa (20 March 1904 – 24 January 1989) was a Uruguayan footballer who played for the Uruguay national team. He was a member of the squad which won the gold medal in 1928 Olympics.

== Career ==
Born in Montevideo, Figueroa played club football for Montevideo Wanderers, where he won two league titles while scoring 75 goals in 331 matches. He was inducted into the club's hall of fame in 2009.

Figueroa made nine appearances for the Uruguay national football team from 1921 to 1933.
