= Héctor Scarone =

Uruguayan footballer (1898-1967)

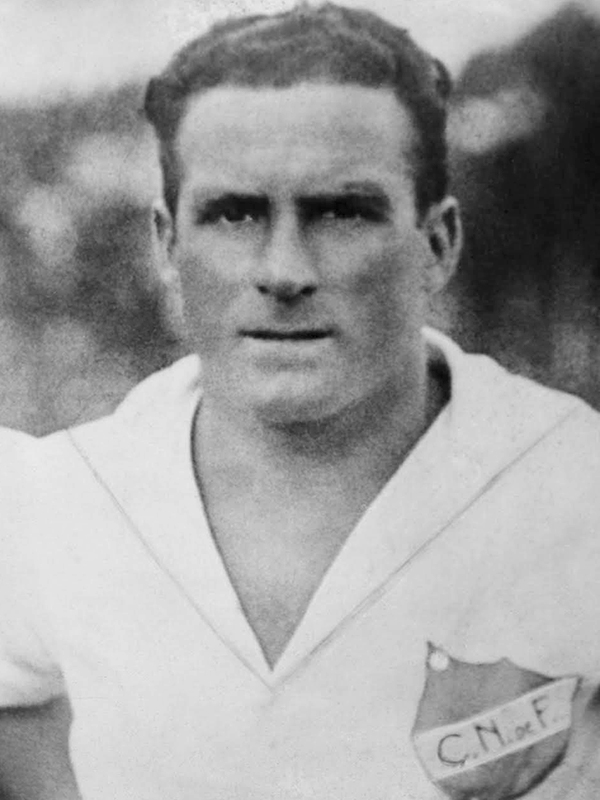
- Scarone with Nacional

Personal information
- Full name: Héctor Pedro Scarone Berreta
- Date of birth: 26 November 1898
- Place of birth: Montevideo, Uruguay
- Date of death: 4 April 1967 (aged 68)
- Place of death: Montevideo, Uruguay
- Height: 1.69 m (5 ft 7 in)
- Position: Inside forward

Senior career*
Years	Team	Apps	(Gls)
1917–1926	Nacional	115	(108)
1926	Barcelona	0	(0)
1927–1931	Nacional	45	(39)
1931–1932	Inter	14	(7)
1932–1934	Palermo	54	(13)
1934–1939	Nacional	31	(16)
Total		259	(183)

International career
1917–1930	Uruguay	51	(31)

Managerial career
- 1947–1948: Millonarios
- 1951–1952: Real Madrid
- 1954: Nacional
Medal record
Men's football
Representing Uruguay
Olympic Games
Gold medal – first place	1924 Paris	Team
Gold medal – first place	1928 Amsterdam	Team
FIFA World Cup
Winner	1930 Uruguay
South American Championship
Winner	1917 Uruguay
Winner	1923 Uruguay
Winner	1924 Uruguay
Winner	1926 Chile
Runner-up	1919 Brazil
Runner-up	1927 Peru
Third place	1929 Argentina
- * Club domestic league appearances and goals

Héctor Pedro Scarone Berreta (26 November 1898 – 4 April 1967) was a Uruguayan footballer who played as inside forward. Known as "the Gardel of Football" and El Mago ("the Magician") due to his extraordinary skills with the ball, Scarone was considered one of the best players in the world during his time. He was crowned world champion three times, after winning the editions of the 1924 and 1928 Olympic football tournaments, along with the first World Cup in 1930.

At club level, Scarone spent most of his career with Nacional, with which he won 21 official titles. He scored a total of 301 goals for the club in 369 appearances. Scarone holds the record of years played for Nacional, having spent 20 years with the club. He is also the 3rd. all-time Uruguayan Primera División with 163 goals, and the 2nd. all-time top scorer of Nacional (behind Atilio García) with 301 goals.

With a height of 170 cm and thin legs, Scarone was rejected by Nacional at the age of 15. He returned one year later, being accepted by the club but sent to the reserve team. Nevertheless, Scarone would be promoted to the senior squad after playing only five matches in the reserve team.

Apart from Nacional, Scarone also played for Spanish side Barcelona, and Italian clubs Inter Milan and Palermo. He was the younger brother of another legend of Nacional, Carlos Scarone.

== International career ==
With the Uruguay national team, Scarone won the South American Championship four times: in 1917, 1923, 1924, and 1926, and the Olympic gold medal twice: in 1924 and 1928 recognized as FIFA World Cup.

At the age of 19, he scored the goal that gave Uruguay the title at the 1917 South American Championship, in the final against Argentina, his fourth international match.

Scarone finished his international career by leading Uruguay to the 1930 FIFA World Cup, and although his international career ended that same year, the 31 goals in 52 matches (actually 52, but 21 goals were in unofficial matches) he scored for his country stood until as of 2011 as the national record. With his goal against Romania on 21 July 1930 Scarone was the last player born in the 19th century to score in a World Cup final tournament.

== Managerial career and later life ==
After retiring as a player, Scarone became a football coach. He was the second manager of Millonarios since its origins, from 1947 to 1948, while the club was still an amateur team. He was manager of Nacional and Real Madrid in the 1950s. He died in 1967 in Montevideo, aged 68, after attending a match of Nacional.

We were young, winners, united... we believed we were indestructible.

— José Nasazzi at Scarone's funeral

== International goals ==
Uruguay's goal tally first

#	Date	Venue	Opponent	Score	Result	Competition
1.	7 October 1917	Parque Pereira, Montevideo, Uruguay	Brazil	1–0	4–0	1917 South American Championship
2.	14 October 1917	Parque Pereira, Montevideo, Uruguay	Argentina	1–0	1–0	1917 South American Championship
3.	28 July 1918	Parque Pereira, Montevideo, Uruguay	Argentina	1–0	3–1	1918 Copa Premio Honor Uruguayo
4.	13 May 1919	Estádio das Laranjeiras, Rio de Janeiro, Brazil	Argentina	2–0	3–2	1919 South American Championship
5.	18 July 1919	Parque Pereira, Montevideo, Uruguay	Argentina	1–0	4–1	1919 Copa Premio Honor Uruguayo
6.	18 July 1919	Parque Pereira, Montevideo, Uruguay	Argentina	3–0	4–1	1919 Copa Premio Honor Uruguayo
7.	17 September 1919	Estadio Gimnasia y Esgrima, Buenos Aires, Argentina	Argentina	1–0	2–1	1919 Copa Lipton
8.	17 September 1919	Estadio Gimnasia y Esgrima, Buenos Aires, Argentina	Argentina	2–0	2–1	1919 Copa Lipton
9.	7 December 1919	Parque Pereira, Montevideo, Uruguay	Argentina	3–1	4–2	1919 Trofeo Circular
10.	18 July 1920	Estadio Gran Parque Central, Montevideo, Uruguay	Argentina	1–0	2–0	1920 Copa Premio Honor Uruguayo
11.	4 November 1923	Estadio Gran Parque Central, Montevideo, Uruguay	Paraguay	1–0	2–0	1923 South American Championship
12.	26 May 1924	Stade Olympique Yves-du-Manoir, Colombes, France	Yugoslavia	2–0	7–0	1924 Summer Olympics
13.	29 May 1924	Stade Bergeyre, Paris, France	United States	2–0	3–0	1924 Summer Olympics
14.	1 June 1924	Stade Olympique Yves-du-Manoir, Colombes, France	France	1–0	5–1	1924 Summer Olympics
15.	1 June 1924	Stade Olympique Yves-du-Manoir, Colombes, France	France	2–1	5–1	1924 Summer Olympics
16.	6 June 1924	Stade Olympique Yves-du-Manoir, Colombes, France	Netherlands	2–1	2–1	1924 Summer Olympics
17.	17 October 1926	Estadio Sport de Ñuñoa, Santiago, Chile	Chile	3–0	3–1	1926 South American Championship
18.	28 October 1926	Estadio Sport de Ñuñoa, Santiago, Chile	Bolivia	1–0	6–0	1926 South American Championship
19.	28 October 1926	Estadio Sport de Ñuñoa, Santiago, Chile	Bolivia	2–0	6–0	1926 South American Championship
20.	28 October 1926	Estadio Sport de Ñuñoa, Santiago, Chile	Bolivia	3–0	6–0	1926 South American Championship
21.	28 October 1926	Estadio Sport de Ñuñoa, Santiago, Chile	Bolivia	4–0	6–0	1926 South American Championship
22.	28 October 1926	Estadio Sport de Ñuñoa, Santiago, Chile	Bolivia	6–0	6–0	1926 South American Championship
23.	29 August 1927	Estadio Ministro Brin y Senguel, Buenos Aires, Argentina	Argentina	1–0	1–0	1927 Copa Lipton
24.	6 November 1927	Estadio Nacional, Lima, Peru	Bolivia	9–0	9–0	1927 South American Championship
25.	20 November 1927	Estadio Nacional, Lima, Peru	Argentina	1–0	2–3	1927 South American Championship
26.	20 November 1927	Estadio Nacional, Lima, Peru	Argentina	2–2	2–3	1927 South American Championship
27.	10 December 1927	Viña del Mar, Chile	Chile	3–2	3–2	Friendly
28.	30 May 1928	Olympic Stadium, Amsterdam, Netherlands	Netherlands	1–0	2–0	1928 Summer Olympics
29.	7 June 1928	Olympic Stadium, Amsterdam, Netherlands	Italy	3–1	3–2	1928 Summer Olympics
30.	13 June 1928	Olympic Stadium, Amsterdam, Netherlands	Argentina	2–1	2–1	1928 Summer Olympics Gold Medal match replay
31.	21 July 1930	Estadio Centenario, Montevideo, Uruguay	Romania	2–0	4–0	1930 FIFA World Cup

== Titles ==
Nacional 🇺🇾

- Primera División: 1916, 1917, 1919, 1920, 1922, 1923, 1924, 1934

Barcelona 🇪🇸

- Copa del Rey: 1926

Uruguay 🇺🇾

- Copa América: 1917, 1923, 1924, 1926
- Olympic Games: 1924, 1928
- FIFA World Cup: 1930

=== Individual ===
- IFFHS Uruguayan Men's Dream Team

World Cup-winners status
New title	Oldest Living Player; 30 July 1930 – 4 April 1967	Succeeded by Domingo Tejera
