= Pedro Petrone =

Uruguayan footballer (1905–1964)

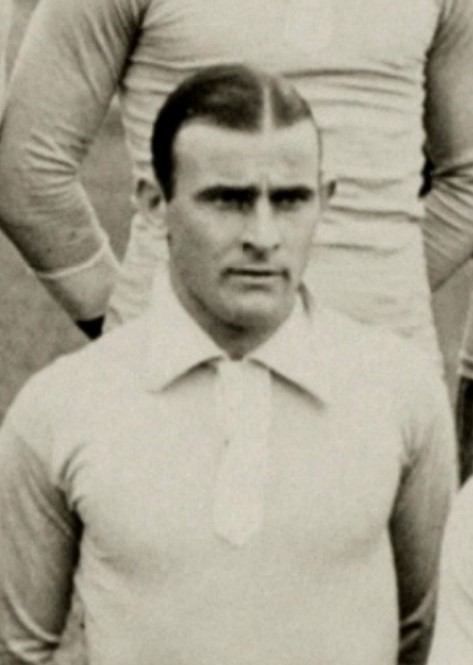
- Petrone in 1928

Personal information
- Full name: Pedro Petrone Schiavone
- Date of birth: 11 May 1905
- Place of birth: Montevideo, Uruguay
- Date of death: 13 December 1964 (aged 59)
- Place of death: Montevideo, Uruguay
- Height: 1.73 m (5 ft 8 in)
- Position: Striker

Senior career*
Years	Team	Apps	(Gls)
1920–	Solferino Montevideo		
–1924	Charley FC		
1924–1931	Nacional	128	(146)
1931–1933	Fiorentina	44	(37)
1933–1934	Nacional	20	(30)

International career
1923–1930	Uruguay	28	(24)
Medal record
Men's football
Representing Uruguay
Olympic Games
Gold medal – first place	1924 Paris	Team
Gold medal – first place	1928 Amsterdam	Team
FIFA World Cup
Winner	1930 Uruguay
South American Championship
Winner	1923 Uruguay
Winner	1924 Uruguay
Runner-up	1927 Peru
Third place	1929 Argentina
- * Club domestic league appearances and goals

Pedro Petrone Schiavone (11 May 1905 – 13 December 1964) was a Uruguayan footballer who played in the role of striker. His nickname was Artillero, meaning artilleryman or gunner, in reference to his goalscoring prowess.

== Club career ==
Throughout his career, Petrone played for Nacional, where he won two National Tournaments (1924, 1934), and in Italy with Fiorentina, where he played 44 games and scored 37 goals; he was the top goalscorer in Serie A during the 1931–32 season). Whilst in Italy, Petrone was timed in the hundred metres at 11 seconds and was said to be the fastest player in the League.

== International career ==
A two-time gold medalist in the 1924 and 1928 Summer Olympics, Petrone also won the 1930 FIFA World Cup with Uruguay. He was 19 years and 1 month old when he received the 1924 gold medal and the tournament top-goalscorer award, still remaining to this day the youngest ever football gold medalist in the history of the Olympic Games.

Petrone won 29 official caps for Uruguay, scoring 24 goals, but early non-FIFA officiated matches would bring his record to 80 caps and 36 goals. He is currently seventh (7th) in the Uruguay top-goalscorers list.

== Death ==
Petrone died in Montevideo in 1964, at the age of 59 years.

== Career statistics ==
Appearances and goals by national team and year
National team	Year	Apps	Goals
Uruguay	1923	3	3
Uruguay	1924	11	11
Uruguay	1927	4	4
Uruguay	1928	5	5
Uruguay	1929	4	0
Uruguay	1930	2	1
Total		29	24

Scores and results list Uruguay's goal tally first, score column indicates score after each Petrone goal.

List of international goals scored by Pedro Petrone
No.	Date	Venue	Opponent	Score	Result	Competition	Ref.
1	4 November 1923	Parque Central, Montevideo, Uruguay	Paraguay	2–0	2–0	1923 South American Championship	
2	25 November 1923	Parque Central, Montevideo, Uruguay	Brazil	1–0	2–1	1923 South American Championship	
3	2 December 1923	Parque Central, Montevideo, Uruguay	Argentina	1–0	2–0	1923 South American Championship	
4	26 May 1924	Stade olympique, Colombes, France	Yugoslavia	1–0	7–0	1924 Summer Olympics	
5	26 May 1924	Stade olympique, Colombes, France	Yugoslavia	3–0	7–0	1924 Summer Olympics	
6	29 May 1924	Stade Bergeyre, Paris, France	United States	1–0	3–0	1924 Summer Olympics	
7	29 May 1924	Stade Bergeyre, Paris, France	United States	3–0	3–0	1924 Summer Olympics	
8	1 June 1924	Stade olympique, Colombes, France	France	3–1	5–1	1924 Summer Olympics	
9	1 June 1924	Stade olympique, Colombes, France	France	4–1	5–1	1924 Summer Olympics	
10	9 June 1924	Stade olympique, Colombes, France	Switzerland	1–0	3–0	1924 Summer Olympics	
11	19 October 1924	Parque Central, Montevideo, Uruguay	Chile	1–0	5–0	1924 South American Championship	
12	19 October 1924	Parque Central, Montevideo, Uruguay	Chile	2–0	5–0	1924 South American Championship	
13	19 October 1924	Parque Central, Montevideo, Uruguay	Chile	5–0	5–0	1924 South American Championship	
14	26 October 1924	Parque Central, Montevideo, Uruguay	Paraguay	1–0	3–1	1924 South American Championship	
15	6 November 1927	Estadio Nacional, Lima, Peru	Bolivia	1–0	9–0	1927 South American Championship	
16	6 November 1927	Estadio Nacional, Lima, Peru	Bolivia	4–0	9–0	1927 South American Championship	
17	6 November 1927	Estadio Nacional, Lima, Peru	Bolivia	8–0	9–0	1927 South American Championship	
18	10 December 1927	Estadio Sausalito, Viña del Mar, Chile	Chile	1–	3–2	Friendly	
19	3 June 1928	Olympic Stadium, Amsterdam, Netherlands	Germany	1–0	4–1	1928 Summer Olympics	
20	3 June 1928	Olympic Stadium, Amsterdam, Netherlands	Germany	2–0	4–1	1928 Summer Olympics	
21	3 June 1928	Olympic Stadium, Amsterdam, Netherlands	Germany	4–1	4–1	1928 Summer Olympics	
22	10 June 1928	Olympic Stadium, Amsterdam, Netherlands	Argentina	1–0	1–1	1928 Summer Olympics	
23	21 September 1928	Parque Central, Montevideo, Uruguay	Argentina	2–	2–2	Friendly	
24	25 May 1930	Estadio Gasómetro, Buenos Aires, Argentina	Argentina	1–1	1–1	Friendly	

== Honours ==
Nacional

- Uruguayan Primera División: 1924, 1933

Uruguay

- Olympic Gold Medal: 1924, 1928
- South American Championship: 1923, 1924; runner-up 1927; third place 1929
- FIFA World Cup: 1930

Individual

- South American Championship top scorer: 1923, 1924, 1927
- South American Championship Player of the tournament: 1924
- Olympic Football Tournament top scorer: 1924
- Capocannoniere: 1931–32
