= Brazil national football team results (1914–1949) =

This page details the match results and statistics of the Brazil national football team from 1914 to 1949.

== Key ==
Key to matches

- Att.=Match attendance
- (H)=Home ground
- (A)=Away ground
- (N)=Neutral ground

Key to record by opponent

- Pld=Games played
- W=Games won
- D=Games drawn
- L=Games lost
- GF=Goals for
- GA=Goals against

== Results ==
Brazil's score is shown first in each case.

No.	Date	Venue	Opponents	Score	Competition	Brazil scorers	Att.	Ref.
1	20 September 1914	Estadio GEBA, Buenos Aires (A)	Argentina	0–3	Friendly		18,000	
2	27 September 1914	Estadio GEBA, Buenos Aires (A)	Argentina	1–0	Copa Julio Argentino Roca	Salles	17,200	
3	8 July 1916	Estadio GEBA, Buenos Aires (N)	Chile	1–1	1916 South American Championship	Demóstenes	15,000	
4	10 July 1916	Estadio GEBA, Buenos Aires (N)	Argentina	1–1	1916 South American Championship	Alencar	16,000	
5	12 July 1916	Estadio GEBA, Buenos Aires (N)	Uruguay	1–2	1916 South American Championship	Friedenreich	15,000	
6	18 July 1916	Parque Central, Montevideo (A)	Uruguay	1–0	Friendly	Sodré	8,000	
7	3 October 1917	Parque Pereira, Montevideo (N)	Argentina	2–4	1917 South American Championship	Neco, Lagreca	20,000	
8	7 October 1917	Parque Pereira, Montevideo (N)	Uruguay	0–4	1917 South American Championship		21,000	
9	12 October 1917	Parque Pereira, Montevideo (N)	Chile	5–0	1917 South American Championship	Caetano, Neco, Haroldo (2), Amílcar	10,000	
10	16 October 1917	Parque Pereira, Montevideo (A)	Uruguay	1–3	Friendly	Neco	40,000	
11	11 May 1919	Estádio das Laranjeiras, Rio de Janeiro (N)	Chile	6–0	1919 South American Championship	Friedenreich (3), Neco (2), Haroldo	20,000	
12	18 May 1919	Estádio das Laranjeiras, Rio de Janeiro (N)	Argentina	3–1	1919 South American Championship	Héitor, Amílcar, Millon	22,000	
13	25 May 1919	Estádio das Laranjeiras, Rio de Janeiro (N)	Uruguay	2–2	1919 South American Championship	Neco (2)	23,000	
14	29 May 1919	Estádio das Laranjeiras, Rio de Janeiro (N)	Uruguay	1–0 (a.e.t.)	1919 South American Championship	Friedenreich	35,000	
15	1 June 1919	Estádio das Laranjeiras, Rio de Janeiro (H)	Argentina	3–3	Copa Roberto Chery	Arlindo (2), Haroldo	—	
16	11 September 1920	Valparaiso Sporting Club, Viña del Mar (N)	Chile	1–0	1920 South American Championship	Alvariza	15,000	
17	18 September 1920	Valparaiso Sporting Club, Viña del Mar (N)	Uruguay	0–6	1920 South American Championship		9,000	
18	25 September 1920	Valparaiso Sporting Club, Viña del Mar (N)	Argentina	0–2	1920 South American Championship		12,000	
19	2 October 1921	Estadio Sportivo Barracas, Buenos Aires (N)	Argentina	0–1	1921 South American Championship		20,000	
20	12 October 1921	Estadio Sportivo Barracas, Buenos Aires (N)	Paraguay	3–0	1921 South American Championship	Machado (2), Candiota	25,000	
21	23 October 1921	Estadio Sportivo Barracas, Buenos Aires (N)	Uruguay	1–2	1921 South American Championship	Zezé	10,000	
22	17 September 1922	Estádio das Laranjeiras, Rio de Janeiro (N)	Chile	1–1	1922 South American Championship	Tatú	30,000	
23	24 September 1922	Estádio das Laranjeiras, Rio de Janeiro (N)	Paraguay	1–1	1922 South American Championship	Amílcar	25,000	
24	1 October 1922	Estádio das Laranjeiras, Rio de Janeiro (N)	Uruguay	0–0	1922 South American Championship		30,000	
25	15 October 1922	Estádio das Laranjeiras, Rio de Janeiro (N)	Argentina	2–0	1922 South American Championship	Neco, Amílcar	25,000	
26	22 October 1922	Parque Antártica, São Paulo (H)	Argentina	2–1	Copa Julio Argentino Roca	Brasileiro, Gambarotta	—	
27	22 October 1922	Estádio das Laranjeiras, Rio de Janeiro (N)	Paraguay	3–0	1922 South American Championship	Neco, Formiga (2)	20,000	
28	29 October 1922	Chácara da Floresta, São Paulo (H)	Paraguay	3–1	Copa Rodrigues Alves	Imparatinho (2), Gambarotta	—	
29	11 November 1923	Parque Central, Montevideo (N)	Paraguay	0–1	1923 South American Championship		15,000	
30	18 November 1923	Parque Central, Montevideo (N)	Argentina	1–2	1923 South American Championship	Nilo	15,000	
31	22 November 1923	Parque Central, Montevideo (N)	Paraguay	2–0	Copa Rodrigues Alves	Zezé, Nilo	—	
32	25 November 1923	Parque Central, Montevideo (N)	Uruguay	1–2	1923 South American Championship	Nilo	20,000	
33	2 December 1923	Estadio Sportivo Barracas, Buenos Aires (A)	Argentina	2–0	Copa Confraternidad	Nilo, Zezé	—	
34	9 December 1923	Estadio Sportivo Barracas, Buenos Aires (A)	Argentina	0–2	Copa Julio Argentino Roca		—	
35	6 December 1925	Estadio Sportivo Barracas, Buenos Aires (N)	Paraguay	5–2	1925 South American Championship	Filo, Friedenreich, Lagarto (2), Nilo	12,000	
36	13 December 1925	Estadio Sportivo Barracas, Buenos Aires (N)	Argentina	1–4	1925 South American Championship	Nilo	25,000	
37	17 December 1925	Estadio Ministro Brin y Senguel, Buenos Aires (N)	Paraguay	3–1	1925 South American Championship	Nilo, Lagarto (2)	14,000	
38	25 December 1925	Estadio Sportivo Barracas, Buenos Aires (N)	Argentina	2–2	1925 South American Championship	Friedenreich, Nilo	18,000	
39	14 July 1930	Parque Central, Montevideo (N)	Yugoslavia	1–2	1930 FIFA World Cup	Preguinho	24,059	
40	20 July 1930	Estadio Centenario, Montevideo (N)	Bolivia	4–0	1930 FIFA World Cup	Moderato (2), Preguinho (2)	25,466	
41	1 August 1930	Estádio das Laranjeiras, Rio de Janeiro (H)	France	3–2	Friendly	Teóphilo, Héitor, Friedenreich	—	
42	10 August 1930	Estádio das Laranjeiras, Rio de Janeiro (H)	Yugoslavia	4–1	Friendly	Carvalho Leite (2), Benedicto, Russinho	—	
43	17 August 1930	Estádio das Laranjeiras, Rio de Janeiro (H)	United States	4–3	Friendly	Preguinho, Carvalho Leite, Doca, Teóphilo	—	
44	6 September 1931	Estádio das Laranjeiras, Rio de Janeiro (H)	Uruguay	2–0	Copa Río Branco	Nilo (2)	16,000	
45	4 December 1932	Estadio Centenario, Montevideo (A)	Uruguay	2–1	Copa Río Branco	Leônidas (2)	13,000	
46	27 May 1934	Stadio Luigi Ferraris, Genoa (N)	Spain	1–3	1934 FIFA World Cup	Leônidas	25,000	
47	3 June 1934	Stadion SK Jugoslavija, Belgrade (A)	Yugoslavia	4–8	Friendly	Leônidas (2), Armandinho, Waldemar de Brito	12,000	
48	27 December 1936	Estadio Gasómetro, Buenos Aires (N)	Peru	3–2	1937 South American Championship	Roberto, Afonsinho, Niginho	20,000	
49	3 January 1937	Estadio Boca Juniors, Buenos Aires (N)	Chile	6–4	1937 South American Championship	Patesko (2), Carvalho Leite, Luisinho (2), Roberto	20,000	
50	13 January 1937	Estadio Gasómetro, Buenos Aires (N)	Paraguay	5–0	1937 South American Championship	Patesko (2), Luisinho (2), Carvalho Leite	20,000	
51	19 January 1937	Estadio Gasómetro, Buenos Aires (N)	Uruguay	3–2	1937 South American Championship	Carvalho Leite, Bahía, Niginho	35,000	
52	30 January 1937	Estadio Gasómetro, Buenos Aires (N)	Argentina	0–1	1937 South American Championship		65,000	
53	1 February 1937	Estadio Gasómetro, Buenos Aires (N)	Argentina	0–2 (a.e.t.)	1937 South American Championship		80,000	
54	5 June 1938	Stade de la Meinau, Strasbourg (N)	Poland	6–5 (a.e.t.)	1938 FIFA World Cup	Leônidas (3), Romeu, Perácio (2)	13,452	
55	12 June 1938	Parc Lescure, Bordeaux (N)	Czechoslovakia	1–1 (a.e.t.)	1938 FIFA World Cup	Leônidas	22,021	
56	14 June 1938	Parc Lescure, Bordeaux (N)	Czechoslovakia	2–1	1938 FIFA World Cup	Leônidas, Roberto	18,141	
57	16 June 1938	Stade Vélodrome, Marseille (N)	Italy	1–2	1938 FIFA World Cup	Romeu	33,000	
58	19 June 1938	Parc Lescure, Bordeaux (N)	Sweden	4–2	1938 FIFA World Cup	Romeu, Leônidas (2), Perácio	12,000	
59	15 January 1939	Estádio São Januário, Rio de Janeiro (H)	Argentina	1–5	Copa Julio Argentino Roca	Leônidas	—	
60	22 January 1939	Estádio São Januário, Rio de Janeiro (H)	Argentina	3–2	Copa Julio Argentino Roca	Leônidas, Adílson, Perácio	—	
61	18 February 1940	Parque Antártica, São Paulo (H)	Argentina	2–2	Copa Julio Argentino Roca	Leônidas (2)	—	
62	25 February 1940	Parque Antártica, São Paulo (H)	Argentina	0–3	Copa Julio Argentino Roca		—	
63	5 March 1940	Estadio Gasómetro, Buenos Aires (A)	Argentina	1–6	Copa Julio Argentino Roca	Jair	—	
64	10 March 1940	Estadio Gasómetro, Buenos Aires (A)	Argentina	3–2	Copa Julio Argentino Roca	Hércules (2), Leônidas	—	
65	17 March 1940	Estadio de Independiente, Avellaneda (A)	Argentina	1–5	Copa Julio Argentino Roca	Leônidas	—	
66	24 March 1940	Estádio São Januário, Rio de Janeiro (H)	Uruguay	3–4	Copa Río Branco	Hércules, Amorim, Leônidas	—	
67	31 March 1940	Estádio São Januário, Rio de Janeiro (H)	Uruguay	1–1	Copa Río Branco	Leônidas	—	
68	14 January 1942	Estadio Centenario, Montevideo (N)	Chile	6–1	1942 South American Championship	Patesko (2), Pirillo (3), Cláudio	10,000	
69	17 January 1942	Estadio Centenario, Montevideo (N)	Argentina	1–2	1942 South American Championship	Servílio	30,000	
70	21 January 1942	Estadio Centenario, Montevideo (N)	Peru	2–1	1942 South American Championship	Amorim (2)	10,000	
71	24 January 1942	Estadio Centenario, Montevideo (N)	Uruguay	0–1	1942 South American Championship		55,000	
72	31 January 1942	Estadio Centenario, Montevideo (N)	Ecuador	5–1	1942 South American Championship	Tim, Pirillo (3), Zizinho	40,000	
73	5 February 1942	Estadio Centenario, Montevideo (N)	Paraguay	1–1	1942 South American Championship	Zizinho	15,000	
74	14 May 1944	Estádio São Januário, Rio de Janeiro (H)	Uruguay	6–1	Friendly	Isaías, Tesourinha, Eduardo Lima (2), Rui, Lelé	—	
75	18 May 1944	Pacaembu Stadium, São Paulo (H)	Uruguay	4–0	Friendly	Jair (3), Heleno de Freitas	—	
76	21 January 1945	Estadio Nacional, Santiago (N)	Colombia	3–0	1945 South American Championship	Jorghino, Heleno de Freitas, Jaime	60,000	
77	28 January 1945	Estadio Nacional, Santiago (N)	Bolivia	2–0	1945 South American Championship	Ademir, Tesourinha	28,000	
78	7 February 1945	Estadio Nacional, Santiago (N)	Uruguay	3–0	1945 South American Championship	Heleno de Freitas (2), Rui	60,000	
79	15 February 1945	Estadio Nacional, Santiago (N)	Argentina	1–3	1945 South American Championship	Heleno de Freitas	65,000	
80	21 February 1945	Estadio Nacional, Santiago (N)	Ecuador	9–2	1945 South American Championship	Zizinho (2), Ademir (3), Heleno de Freitas (2), Jair (2)	22,000	
81	28 February 1945	Estadio Nacional, Santiago (N)	Chile	1–0	1945 South American Championship	Heleno de Freitas	80,000	
82	16 December 1945	Pacaembu Stadium, São Paulo (H)	Argentina	3–4	Copa Julio Argentino Roca	Salomón (o.g.), Zizinho, Ademir	—	
83	20 December 1945	Estádio São Januário, Rio de Janeiro (H)	Argentina	6–2	Copa Julio Argentino Roca	Ademir (2), Leônidas, Chico, Zizinho, Heleno de Freitas	—	
84	23 December 1945	Estádio São Januário, Rio de Janeiro (H)	Argentina	3–1	Copa Julio Argentino Roca	Heleno de Freitas, Eduardo Lima, Fonda (o.g.)	—	
85	5 January 1946	Estadio Centenario, Montevideo (A)	Uruguay	3–4	Copa Río Branco	Jair (2), Zizinho	—	
86	9 January 1946	Estadio Centenario, Montevideo (A)	Uruguay	1–1	Copa Río Branco	Ademir	—	
87	16 January 1946	Estadio Gasómetro, Buenos Aires (N)	Bolivia	3–0	1946 South American Championship	Heleno de Freitas (2), Zizinho	50,000	
88	23 January 1946	Estadio Gasómetro, Buenos Aires (N)	Uruguay	4–3	1946 South American Championship	Jair (2), Heleno de Freitas, Chico	40,000	
89	29 January 1946	Estadio de Independiente, Avellaneda (N)	Paraguay	1–1	1946 South American Championship	Norival	30,000	
90	3 February 1946	Estadio Gasómetro, Buenos Aires (N)	Chile	5–1	1946 South American Championship	Zizinho (4), Chico	22,000	
91	10 February 1946	Estadio Monumental, Buenos Aires (N)	Argentina	0–2	1946 South American Championship		80,000	
92	29 March 1947	Pacaembu Stadium, São Paulo (H)	Uruguay	0–0	Copa Río Branco		—	
93	1 April 1947	Estádio São Januário, Rio de Janeiro (H)	Uruguay	3–2	Copa Río Branco	Tesourinha, Jair, Heleno de Freitas	—	
94	4 April 1948	Estadio Centenario, Montevideo (A)	Uruguay	1–1	Copa Río Branco	Danilo Alvim	—	
95	11 April 1948	Estadio Centenario, Montevideo (A)	Uruguay	2–4	Copa Río Branco	Canhotinho, Carlyle	—	
96	3 April 1949	Estádio São Januário, Rio de Janeiro (N)	Ecuador	9–1	1949 South American Championship	Tesourinha (2), Octávio, Jair (2), Simão (2), Zizinho, Ademir	70,000	
97	10 April 1949	Pacaembu Stadium, São Paulo (N)	Bolivia	10–1	1949 South American Championship	Nininho (3), Jair, Zizinho (2), Cláudio (2), Simão (2)	40,000	
98	13 April 1949	Pacaembu Stadium, São Paulo (N)	Chile	2–1	1949 South American Championship	Zizinho, Cláudio	45,000	
99	17 April 1949	Pacaembu Stadium, São Paulo (N)	Colombia	5–0	1949 South American Championship	Tesourinha, Canhotinho, Orlando, Ademir (2)	45,000	
100	24 April 1949	Estádio São Januário, Rio de Janeiro (N)	Peru	7–1	1949 South American Championship	Arce (o.g.), Augusto, Jair (2), Simão, Ademir, Orlando	45,000	
101	30 April 1949	Estádio São Januário, Rio de Janeiro (N)	Uruguay	5–1	1949 South American Championship	Jair (2), Zizinho, Danilo Alvim, Tesourinha	45,000	
102	8 May 1949	Estádio São Januário, Rio de Janeiro (N)	Paraguay	1–2	1949 South American Championship	Tesourinha	35,000	
103	11 May 1949	Estádio São Januário, Rio de Janeiro (N)	Paraguay	7–0	1949 South American Championship	Ademir (3), Tesourinha (2), Jair (2)	55,000	

== Record by opponent ==
Team	Pld	W	D	L	GF	GA	GD	WPCT
Argentina	30	9	4	17	45	68	−23	30.00
Bolivia	4	4	0	0	19	1	+18	100.00
Chile	10	8	2	0	34	9	+25	80.00
Colombia	2	2	0	0	8	0	+8	100.00
Czechoslovakia	2	1	1	0	3	2	+1	50.00
Ecuador	3	3	0	0	23	4	+19	100.00
France	1	1	0	0	3	2	+1	100.00
Italy	1	0	0	1	1	2	−1	0.00
Paraguay	13	8	3	2	35	10	+25	61.54
Peru	3	3	0	0	12	4	+8	100.00
Poland	1	1	0	0	6	5	+1	100.00
Spain	1	0	0	1	1	3	−2	0.00
Sweden	1	1	0	0	4	2	+2	100.00
United States	1	1	0	0	4	3	+1	100.00
Uruguay	27	11	6	10	51	47	+4	40.74
Yugoslavia	3	1	0	2	9	11	−2	33.33
Total	103	54	16	33	258	173	+85	52.43

Source: Results
