= 1949 in Brazilian football =

Football in Brazil
- Season: 1949

The following article presents a summary of the 1949 football (soccer) season in Brazil, which was the 48th season of competitive football in the country.

== Campeonato Paulista ==
Final Standings

Position	Team	Points	Played	Won	Drawn	Lost	For	Against	Difference
1	São Paulo	36	22	16	4	2	70	23	47
2	Palmeiras	28	22	12	4	6	40	31	9
3	Portuguesa	27	22	11	5	6	57	42	15
4	Santos	26	22	11	4	7	51	40	11
5	Ypiranga-SP	24	22	11	2	9	50	42	8
6	Corinthians	24	22	8	8	6	49	37	12
7	Portuguesa Santista	23	22	9	5	8	38	32	6
8	XV de Piracicaba	22	22	9	4	9	45	44	1
9	Jabaquara	17	22	7	3	12	44	53	-9
10	Juventus	15	22	5	5	12	28	51	-23
11	Nacional-SP	12	22	5	2	15	27	70	-43
12	Comercial-SP	10	22	3	4	15	29	63	-34

São Paulo declared as the Campeonato Paulista champions.

=== Relegation ===
The worst placed team, which is Comercial-SP, was relegated to the following year's second level.

== State championship champions ==
State	Champion	State	Champion
Acre	América-AC	Paraíba	Botafogo-PB
Alagoas	CSA	Paraná	Atlético Paranaense
Amapá	not disputed	Pernambuco	Sport Recife
Amazonas	Fast	Piauí	Botafogo-PI
Bahia	Bahia	Rio de Janeiro	Cascatinha
Ceará	Fortaleza	Rio de Janeiro (DF)	Vasco
Espírito Santo	Rio Branco-ES	Rio Grande do Norte	América-RN
Goiás	Atlético Goianiense	Rio Grande do Sul	Grêmio
Maranhão	Moto Club	Rondônia	Ferroviário-RO
Mato Grosso	Mixto	Santa Catarina	Olímpico
Minas Gerais	Atlético Mineiro	São Paulo	São Paulo
Pará	Remo	Sergipe	Palestra-SE

== Brazil national team ==
The following table lists all the games played by the Brazil national football team in official competitions and friendly matches during 1949.

Date	Opposition	Result	Score	Brazil scorers	Competition
April 3, 1949	Ecuador	W	9-1	Simão (2), Jair da Rosa Pinto (2), Tesourinha (2), Ademir Menezes, Octávio, Zizinho	South American Championship
April 10, 1949	Bolivia	W	10-1	Nininho (3), Cláudio Pinho (2), Simão (2), Zizinho (2), Jair da Rosa Pinto	South American Championship
April 13, 1949	Chile	W	2-1	Cláudio Pinho, Zizinho	South American Championship
April 17, 1949	Colombia	W	5-0	Ademir Menezes (2), Orlando Pingo de Ouro, Tesourinha, Canhotinho	South American Championship
April 24, 1949	Peru	W	7-1	Arce (own goal), Simão, Orlando Pingo de Ouro, Augusto, Ademir Menezes, Jair da Rosa Pinto (2)	South American Championship
April 30, 1949	Uruguay	W	5-1	Tesourinha, Zizinho, Danilo Alvim, Jair da Rosa Pinto (2)	South American Championship
May 8, 1949	Paraguay	L	1-2	Tesourinha	South American Championship
May 11, 1949	Paraguay	W	7-0	Ademir Menezes (3), Jair da Rosa Pinto (2), Tesourinha (2)	South American Championship
