= 1949 South American Championship play-off =

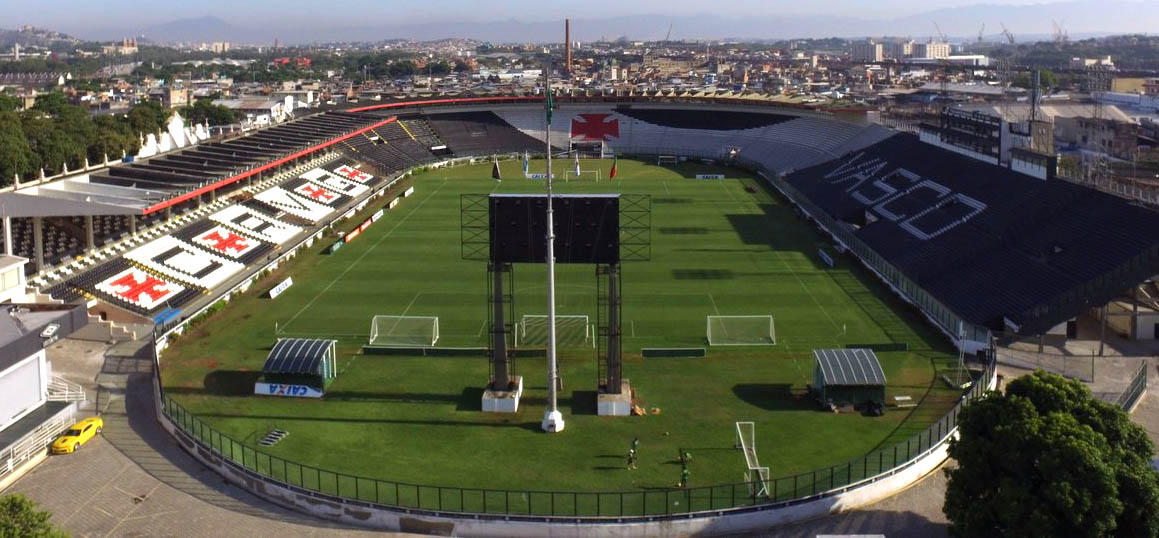
- Estadio Sao Januario, venue
- Event: 1949 South American Championship
Brazil	Paraguay
7	0
- Date: May 11, 1949
- Venue: Estádio São Januário, Rio de Janeiro
- Referee: Cyril J. Barrick (England)
- Attendance: 55,000

The 1949 South American Championship play-off was a match held to determine the winner of the 1949 South American Championship, the 21st edition of this continental championship, as Brazil and Paraguay were tied for the first place after the regular competition. The match took place on May 11, 1949, at Estádio São Januário in Rio de Janeiro.

Brazil had won all its previous matches, thrashing their rivals in all of them (totaling 36 goals in 5 games). Nevertheless, the 2–1 loss to Paraguay caused both teams tied on points so a play-off match had to be played to crown a champion.

On the other hand, the Paraguay side had a strong team with such notable players, regarded by some journalists as the best of its history. In fact, the Paraguayan side achieved some notable results such as the 2nd place in the previous edition.

Brazil won the match against Paraguay, thrashing them by 7–0 and winning its 3rd continental title.

== Background ==
Brazil
Round
Paraguay
Opponent
Result
Group stage
Opponent
Result
Ecuador
9–1
Match 1
Colombia
3–0

Bolivia
10–1
Match 2
Ecuador
1–0

Chile
2–1
Match 3
Peru
3–1

Colombia
5–0
Match 4
Uruguay
1–2

Peru
7–1
Match 5
Chile
4–2

Uruguay
5–1
Match 6
Bolivia
7–0

Paraguay
1–2
Match 7
Brazil
2–1

Team	Pld	W	D	L	GF	GA	GD	Pts
Brazil	7	6	0	1	39	7	+32	12
Paraguay	7	6	0	1	21	6	+15	12
Peru	7	5	0	2	20	13	+7	10
Bolivia	7	4	0	3	13	24	−11	8
Chile	7	2	1	4	10	14	−4	5
Uruguay	7	2	1	4	14	20	−6	5
Ecuador	7	1	0	6	7	21	−14	2
Colombia	7	0	2	5	4	23	−19	2

Notes

- Brazil and Paraguay finished tied on points so a playoff match had to be played to decide the champion.

== Match details ==
May 11, 1949

Brazil	7–0	Paraguay
Ademir 17', 27', 48'; Tesourinha 43', 70'; Jair 72', 89'

Estádio São Januário, Rio de Janeiro
Attendance: 55,000
Referee: Cyril John Barrick (England)

Brazil	Paraguay

GK	Barbosa
RB	Augusto
LB	Mauro
RH	Ely
CH	Danilo
LH	Noronha
OR	Tesourinha
IR	Zizinho
CF	Ademir
IL	Jair
OL	Simão
Substitutions:
Manager:
Flávio Costa

GK	Sinforiano García
RB	Alberto González
LB	Casiano Céspedes
RH	Manuel Gavilán
CH	Pedro Nardelli
LH	Castor Cantero
OR	Pedro Fernández	Substituted off
IR	César López Fretes	Substituted off
CF	Dionisio Arce
IL	Jorge D. Benítez
OL	Félix Vázquez
Substitutions:
FW	Marcial Barrios	Substituted on
FW	Estanislao Romero	Substituted on
Manager:
Manuel Fleitas Solich
