= Copa América records and statistics =

This is a list of records and statistics of the Copa América, including from when it was called the South American Championship (1916–1975).

== General statistics by tournament ==
Year	Hosts	Champions	Winning coach	Golden Boot (goals)	Best player
1916	Argentina	Uruguay	(Uruguay) Alfredo Foglino	(Uruguay) Isabelino Gradín (3)	(Uruguay) Isabelino Gradín
1917	Uruguay	Uruguay	(Uruguay) Ramón Platero	(Uruguay) Ángel Romano (4)	(Uruguay) Héctor Scarone
1919	Brazil	Brazil	(Brazil) Haroldo	(Brazil) Arthur Friedenreich (4) (Brazil) Neco (4)	(Brazil) Arthur Friedenreich
1920	Chile	Uruguay	(Uruguay) Ernesto Fígoli	(Uruguay) José Pérez (3) (Uruguay) Ángel Romano (3)	(Uruguay) José Piendibene
1921	Argentina	Argentina	(Argentina) Pedro Calomino	(Argentina) Julio Libonatti (3)	(Argentina) Américo Tesoriere
1922	Brazil	Brazil	(Brazil) Laís	(Argentina) Juan Francia (4)	(Brazil) Agostinho Fortes Filho
1923	Uruguay	Uruguay	(Uruguay) Leonardo De Lucca	(Argentina) Vicente Aguirre (3) (Uruguay) Pedro Petrone (3)	(Uruguay) José Nasazzi
1924	Uruguay	Uruguay	(Uruguay) Ernesto Meliante	(Uruguay) Pedro Petrone (4)	(Uruguay) Pedro Petrone
1925	Argentina	Argentina	(Argentina) Américo Tesoriere	(Argentina) Manuel Seoane (6)	(Argentina) Manuel Seoane
1926	Chile	Uruguay	(Uruguay) Ernesto Fígoli	(Chile) David Arellano (7)	(Uruguay) José Leandro Andrade
1927	Peru	Argentina	(Spain) José Lago Millán	(Argentina) Alfredo Carricaberry (3) (Argentina) Segundo Luna (3) (Uruguay) Roberto Figueroa (3) (Uruguay) Pedro Petrone (3) (Uruguay) Héctor Scarone (3)	(Argentina) Manuel Seoane
1929	Argentina	Argentina	(Argentina) Francisco Olazar	(Paraguay) Aurelio González (5)	(Argentina) Manuel Ferreira
1935	Peru	Uruguay	(Uruguay) Raúl Blanco	(Argentina) Herminio Masantonio (4)	(Uruguay) José Nasazzi
1937	Argentina	Argentina	(Argentina) Manuel Seoane	(Chile) Raúl Toro Julio (7)	(Argentina) Vicente de la Mata
1939	Peru	Peru	(England) Jack Greenwell	(Peru) Teodoro Fernández (7)	(Peru) Teodoro Fernández
1941	Chile	Argentina	(Argentina) Guillermo Stábile	(Argentina) Juan Marvezzi (5)	(Chile) Sergio Livingstone
1942	Uruguay	Uruguay	(Uruguay) Pedro Cea	(Argentina) Herminio Masantonio (7) (Argentina) José Manuel Moreno (7)	(Uruguay) Obdulio Varela
1945	Chile	Argentina	(Argentina) Guillermo Stábile	(Argentina) Norberto Méndez (6) (Brazil) Heleno de Freitas (6)	(Brazil) Domingos da Guia
1946	Argentina	Argentina	(Argentina) Guillermo Stábile	(Uruguay) José María Medina (7)	(Argentina) Adolfo Pedernera
1947	Ecuador	Argentina	(Argentina) Guillermo Stábile	(Uruguay) Nicolás Falero (8)	(Argentina) José Manuel Moreno
1949	Brazil	Brazil	(Brazil) Flávio Costa	(Brazil) Jair (9)	(Brazil) Ademir
1953	Peru	Paraguay	(Paraguay) Manuel Fleitas Solich	(Chile) Francisco Molina (7)	(Paraguay) Heriberto Herrera
1955	Chile	Argentina	(Argentina) Guillermo Stábile	(Argentina) Rodolfo Micheli (8)	(Chile) Enrique Hormazábal
1956	Uruguay	Uruguay	(Uruguay) Hugo Bagnulo	(Chile) Enrique Hormazábal (4)	(Uruguay) Óscar Míguez
1957	Peru	Argentina	(Argentina) Guillermo Stábile	(Argentina) Humberto Maschio (9) (Uruguay) Javier Ambrois (9)	(Argentina) Omar Sívori
1959	Argentina	Argentina	(Argentina) Victorio Spinetto	(Brazil) Pelé (8)	(Brazil) Pelé
1959	Ecuador	Uruguay	(Uruguay) Juan Carlos Corazzo	(Argentina) José Sanfilippo (6)	(Uruguay) Alcides Silveira
1963	Bolivia	Bolivia	(Brazil) Danilo Alvim	(Ecuador) Carlos Alberto Raffo (6)	(Bolivia) Ramiro Blacut
1967	Uruguay	Uruguay	(Uruguay) Juan Carlos Corazzo	(Argentina) Luis Artime (5)	(Uruguay) Pedro Rocha
1975	Various	Peru	(Peru) Marcos Calderón	(Argentina) Leopoldo Luque (4) (Colombia) Ernesto Díaz (4)	(Peru) Teófilo Cubillas
1979	Various	Paraguay	(Paraguay) Ranulfo Miranda	(Chile) Jorge Peredo (4) (Paraguay) Eugenio Morel (4)	(Chile) Carlos Caszely
1983	Various	Uruguay	(Uruguay) Omar Borrás	(Argentina) Jorge Burruchaga (3) (Brazil) Roberto Dinamite (3) (Uruguay) Carlos Aguilera (3)	(Uruguay) Enzo Francescoli
1987	Argentina	Uruguay	(Uruguay) Roberto Fleitas	(Colombia) Arnoldo Iguarán (4)	(Colombia) Carlos Valderrama
1989	Brazil	Brazil	(Brazil) Sebastião Lazaroni	(Brazil) Bebeto (6)	(Uruguay) Rubén Sosa
1991	Chile	Argentina	(Argentina) Alfio Basile	(Argentina) Gabriel Batistuta (6)	(Argentina) Leonardo Rodríguez
1993	Ecuador	Argentina	(Argentina) Alfio Basile	(Venezuela) José Luis Dolgetta (4)	(Argentina) Sergio Goycochea
1995	Uruguay	Uruguay	(Uruguay) Héctor Núñez	(Argentina) Gabriel Batistuta (4) (Mexico) Luis García (4)	(Uruguay) Enzo Francescoli
1997	Bolivia	Brazil	(Brazil) Mário Zagallo	(Mexico) Luis Hernández (6)	(Brazil) Ronaldo
1999	Paraguay	Brazil	(Brazil) Vanderlei Luxemburgo	(Brazil) Rivaldo (5) (Brazil) Ronaldo (5)	(Brazil) Rivaldo
2001	Colombia	Colombia	(Colombia) Francisco Maturana	(Colombia) Víctor Aristizábal (6)	(Honduras) Amado Guevara
2004	Peru	Brazil	(Brazil) Carlos Alberto Parreira	(Brazil) Adriano (7)	(Brazil) Adriano
2007	Venezuela	Brazil	(Brazil) Dunga	(Brazil) Robinho (6)	(Brazil) Robinho
2011	Argentina	Uruguay	(Uruguay) Óscar Tabárez	(Peru) Paolo Guerrero (5)	(Uruguay) Luis Suárez
2015	Chile	Chile	(Argentina) Jorge Sampaoli	(Chile) Eduardo Vargas (4) (Peru) Paolo Guerrero (4)	(Argentina) Lionel Messi
2016	United States	Chile	(Spain) Juan Antonio Pizzi	(Chile) Eduardo Vargas (6)	(Chile) Alexis Sánchez
2019	Brazil	Brazil	(Brazil) Tite	(Brazil) Everton (3) (Peru) Paolo Guerrero (3)	(Brazil) Dani Alves
2021	Brazil	Argentina	(Argentina) Lionel Scaloni	(Argentina) Lionel Messi (4) (Colombia) Luis Díaz (4)	(Argentina) Lionel Messi
2024	United States	Argentina	(Argentina) Lionel Scaloni	(Argentina) Lautaro Martínez (5)	(Colombia) James Rodríguez

Note: Carlos Valderrama (1987) was the first player to officially win the best player of the tournament award.

== Debut of national teams ==
Year	Debuting teams		
Year	Teams	No.	Cum.
1916	Argentina, Brazil, Chile, Uruguay	4	4
1917 – 1920	None	0	4
1921	Paraguay	1	5
1922 – 1925	None	0	5
1926	Bolivia	1	6
1927	Peru	1	7
1929 – 1937	None	0	7
1939	Ecuador	1	8
1939 – 1942	None	0	8
1945	Colombia	1	9
1946 – 1963	None	0	9
1967	Venezuela	1	10
1975 – 1991	None	0	10
1993	Mexico, United States	2	12
1995	None	0	12
1997	Costa Rica	1	13
1999	Japan	1	14
2001	Honduras	1	15
2004 – 2011	None	0	15
2015	Jamaica	1	16
2016	Haiti, Panama	2	18
2019	Qatar	1	19
2021	None	0	19
2024	Canada	1	20

== Overall team records ==
As of 2024 Copa América

In this ranking 3 points are awarded for a win, 1 for a draw and 0 for a loss. As per statistical convention in football, matches decided in extra time are counted as wins and losses, while matches decided by penalty shoot-outs are counted as draws. Teams are ranked by total points, then by goal difference, then by goals scored.

Rank	Team	Part.	Pld	W	D	L	GF	GA	GD	Pts
1	Argentina	44	208	132	43	33	483	183	+300	439
2	Uruguay	46	212	115	40	57	421	226	+195	385
3	Brazil	38	195	109	41	45	435	206	+229	368
4	Chile	41	191	67	35	89	291	317	−26	236
5	Paraguay	39	180	64	43	73	267	311	−44	235
6	Peru	34	164	58	40	66	230	258	−28	214
7	Colombia	24	130	53	26	51	154	194	−40	185
8	Bolivia	29	122	20	26	76	109	308	−199	86
9	Ecuador	30	130	17	28	85	139	331	−192	79
10	Mexico	11	51	20	14	17	67	63	+4	74
11	Venezuela	20	74	11	18	45	59	182	−123	51
12	Costa Rica	6	20	6	4	10	19	35	−16	22
13	United States	5	21	6	2	13	21	32	−11	20
14	Honduras	1	6	3	1	2	7	5	+2	10
15	Panama	2	7	3	0	4	10	20	−10	9
16	Canada	1	6	1	3	2	4	7	−3	6
17	Japan	2	6	0	3	3	6	15	−9	3
18	Qatar	1	3	0	1	2	2	5	−3	1
19	Haiti	1	3	0	0	3	1	12	−11	0
20	Jamaica	3	9	0	0	9	1	16	−15	0

== Medal table ==
No third place match was played in 1975, 1979 and 1983.

Rank	Nation	Gold	Silver	Bronze	Total
1	Argentina	16	14	5	35
2	Uruguay	15	6	10	31
3	Brazil	9	12	7	28
4	Paraguay	2	6	7	15
5	Chile	2	4	5	11
6	Peru	2	1	8	11
7	Colombia	1	2	5	8
8	Bolivia	1	1	0	2
9	Mexico	0	2	3	5
10	Honduras	0	0	1	1
Totals (10 entries)		48	48	51	147

== Hosts ==
Results of host nations
Year	Hosting team	Finish
1916	Argentina	Runners-up
1917	Uruguay	Champions
1919	Brazil	Champions
1920	Chile	Fourth place
1921	Argentina	Champions
1922	Brazil	Champions
1923	Uruguay	Champions
1924	Uruguay	Champions
1925	Argentina	Champions
1926	Chile	Third place
1927	Peru	Third place
1929	Argentina	Champions
1935	Peru	Third place
1937	Argentina	Champions
1939	Peru	Champions
1941	Chile	Third place
1942	Uruguay	Champions
1945	Chile	Third place
1946	Argentina	Champions
1947	Ecuador	Sixth place
1949	Brazil	Champions
1953	Peru	Fifth place
1955	Chile	Runners-up
1956	Uruguay	Champions
1957	Peru	Fourth place
1959	Argentina	Champions
1959	Ecuador	Fourth place
1963	Bolivia	Champions
1967	Uruguay	Champions
1975	No host	
1979	No host	
1983	No host	
1987	Argentina	Fourth place
1989	Brazil	Champions
1991	Chile	Third place
1993	Ecuador	Fourth place
1995	Uruguay	Champions
1997	Bolivia	Runners-up
1999	Paraguay	Quarter-finals
2001	Colombia	Champions
2004	Peru	Quarter-finals
2007	Venezuela	Quarter-finals
2011	Argentina	Quarter-finals
2015	Chile	Champions
2016	United States	Fourth place
2019	Brazil	Champions
2021	Brazil	Runners-up
2024	United States	Group stage

== Defending champions ==
Results of defending champions
Year	Defending champions	Finish
1917	Uruguay	Champions
1919	Uruguay	Runners-up
1920	Brazil	Third place
1921	Uruguay	Third place
1922	Argentina	Fourth place
1923	Brazil	Fourth place
1924	Uruguay	Champions
1925	Uruguay	Did not enter
1926	Argentina	Runners-up
1927	Uruguay	Runners-up
1929	Argentina	Champions
1935	Argentina	Runners-up
1937	Uruguay	Third place
1939	Uruguay	Runners-up
1941	Peru	Fourth place
1942	Argentina	Runners-up
1945	Uruguay	Fourth place
1946	Argentina	Champions
1947	Argentina	Champions
1949	Argentina	Did not enter
1953	Brazil	Runners-up
1955	Peru	Third place
1956	Argentina	Runners-up
1957	Uruguay	Third place
1959	Argentina	Champions
1959	Argentina	Runners-up
1963	Uruguay	Did not enter
1967	Bolivia	Sixth place
1975	Uruguay	Semi-finals
1979	Peru	Semi-finals
1983	Paraguay	Semi-finals
1987	Uruguay	Champions
1989	Uruguay	Runners-up
1991	Brazil	Runners-up
1993	Argentina	Champions
1995	Argentina	Quarter-finals
1997	Uruguay	Group stage
1999	Brazil	Champions
2001	Brazil	Quarter-finals
2004	Colombia	Fourth place
2007	Brazil	Champions
2011	Brazil	Quarter-finals
2015	Uruguay	Quarter-finals
2016	Chile	Champions
2019	Chile	Fourth place
2021	Brazil	Runners-up
2024	Argentina	Champions
2028	Argentina	TBD

== Coaches with most matches ==
Rank	Coach	Nationality	Team(s) managed	Matches	Tournaments	Notes
1	Guillermo Stábile	(Argentina)	(Argentina)	44	1941, 1942, 1945, 1946, 1947, 1955, 1957	Champion in 1941, 1945, 1946, 1947, 1955 and 1957
2	Luis Tirado	(Chile)	(Chile)	35	1946, 1947, 1949, 1953, 1955, 1956	Runner-up in 1955 and 1956
3	Manuel Fleitas Solich	(Paraguay)	(Paraguay)	33	1942, 1946, 1947, 1949, 1953	Champion in 1953
3	Óscar Tabárez	(Uruguay)	(Uruguay)	33	1989, 2007, 2011, 2015, 2016, 2019, 2021	Champion in 2011
5	Francisco Maturana	(Colombia)	(Colombia) (Ecuador)	27	1987, 1989, 1993, 1995, 1997, 2001	Champion in 2001
6	Hernán Darío Gómez	(Colombia)	(Colombia) (Ecuador) (Panama)	26	1995, 1997, 2001, 2004, 2011, 2016, 2019	
7	Ricardo Gareca	(Argentina)	(Peru) (Chile)	22	2015, 2016, 2019, 2021, 2024	Runner-up in 2019
8	Alfio Basile	(Argentina)	(Argentina)	19	1991, 1993, 2007	Champion in 1991 and 1993
8	Flávio Costa	(Brazil)	(Brazil)	19	1945, 1946, 1949	Champion in 1949
8	Lionel Scaloni	(Argentina)	(Argentina)	19	2019, 2021, 2024	Champion in 2021 and 2024

== Titles by coach ==
Rank	Coach	Nationality	Team(s) managed	Titles	Notes
1	Guillermo Stábile	(Argentina)	(Argentina)	6	Champion in 1941, 1945, 1946, 1947, 1955 and 1957 (runner-up in 1942)
2	Alfio Basile	(Argentina)	(Argentina)	2	1991 and 1993 (runner-up in 2007)
2	Juan Carlos Corazzo	(Uruguay)	(Uruguay)	2	1959 and 1967
2	Ernesto Fígoli	(Uruguay)	(Uruguay)	2	1920 and 1926
2	Lionel Scaloni	(Argentina)	(Argentina)	2	2021 and 2024

- Dunga of Brazil, Manuel Seoane of Argentina, Danilo Alvim of Brazil and Pedro Cea of Uruguay won the Copa América as a player and also as a coach: Cea won in 1923 and 1924 as a player and in 1942 as a coach; Seoane won in 1925, 1927 and 1929 as a player and in 1937 as a coach; Alvim won in 1949 as a player and in 1963 as a coach (coaching Bolivia); Dunga won in 1989 and 1997 as a player and in 2007 as a coach.
- Guillermo Stábile, Alfio Basile and Lionel Scaloni all had retained the title: Stábile in 1945, 1946 and 1947 and he is the most retained coach three times; Basile in 1991 and 1993; Scaloni in 2021 and 2024 all of them with Argentina.
- José Lago Millán (Spain) , Jack Greenwell (England) , Danilo Alvim (Brazil) , Jorge Sampaoli, and Juan Antonio Pizzi (Spain) won the title as foreign coaches: Millán with Argentina in 1927; Greenwell with Peru in 1939; Alvim with Bolivia in 1963; Sampaoli with Chile in 2015; Pizzi with Chile in 2016.

== Most tournaments hosted ==
Years in bold indicate hosting nation won the tournament.

No. of times hosted	Country	Year(s)	Wins as host
9	Argentina	1916, **1921, 1925, 1929, 1937, 1946, 1959,** 1987, 2011	6/9
7	Chile	1920, 1926, 1941, 1945, 1955, 1991, **2015**	1/7
7	Uruguay	**1917, 1923, 1924, 1942, 1956, 1967, 1995**	7/7
6	Brazil	**1919, 1922, 1949, 1989, 2019,** 2021	5/6
6	Peru	1927, 1935, **1949,** 1953, 1957, 2004	1/6
3	Ecuador	1947, 1959, 1993	0/3
3	No Host	1975, 1979, 1983	–/–
2	Bolivia	**1963**, 1997	1/2
2	United States	2016, 2024	0/2
1	Colombia	**2001**	1/1
1	Paraguay	1999	0/1
1	Venezuela	2007	0/1

== Teams ==
=== Overall ===
- Most Copa América appearances: 46, Uruguay

For a detailed list, see Copa América participations

- Most championships: 16, Argentina
- Most appearances in Copa América final matches: 30, Argentina
- Most appearances in Copa América top four: 37, Argentina

For a detailed list of top four appearances, see Copa América results

- Most matches played: 212, Uruguay
- Fewest matches played: 3, Haiti, Qatar
- Most wins: 132, Argentina
- Most losses: 89, Chile
- Most draws: 43, Argentina, Paraguay
- Team with the most goals scored in a single match: Argentina 12−0 Ecuador (1942)
- Most goals scored: 483, Argentina
- Most goals conceded: 331, Ecuador
- Fewest goals scored: 1, Haiti, Jamaica
- Fewest goals conceded: 5, Honduras, Qatar
- Highest average of goals scored per match: 2.32, Argentina
- Lowest average of goals conceded per match: 0.83, Honduras

=== In one tournament ===
- Most wins: 7, Brazil (1949)
- Most goals scored: 46, Brazil (1949)
- Fewest goals conceded: 0, Colombia (2001)
- Most goals conceded: 31, Ecuador (1942)
- Most minutes without conceding a goal: 540, Colombia (2001)

=== Streaks ===
- Most consecutive championships: 3, Argentina 1945, 1946, 1947
- Most consecutive final matches: 8, Argentina 1923–1937
- Most consecutive runners-up: 2
  - Argentina (4 times)
  - Brazil (2 times)
  - Uruguay
  - Chile

== Individual ==
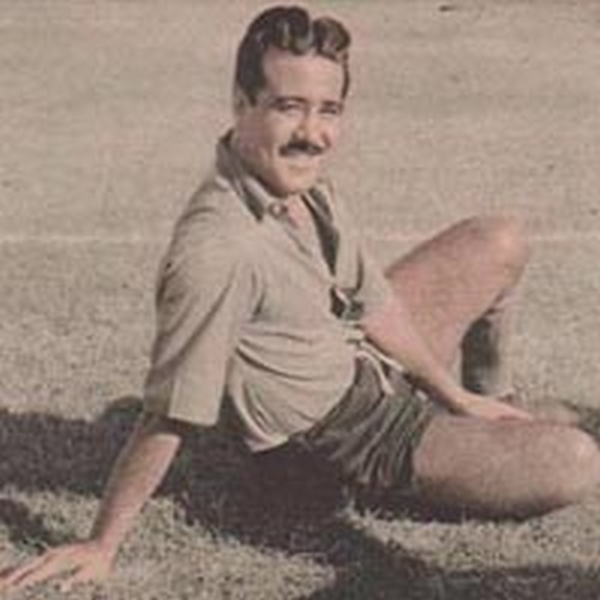
Argentine midfielder Norberto Méndez is the joint all-time top scorer in Copa América history, with a 17-goal tally.

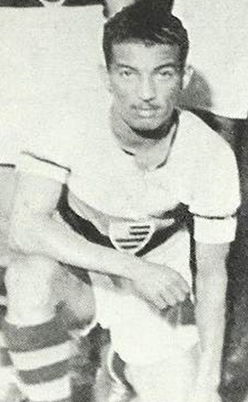
Brazilian Zizinho scored a joint-record 17 goals in Copa América history.

=== Goals scored ===
Rank	Player	Country	Goals
1	Norberto Méndez	Argentina	17
1	Zizinho	Brazil	17
3	Teodoro Fernández	Peru	15
3	Severino Varela	Uruguay	15
5	Paolo Guerrero	Peru	14
5	Lionel Messi	Argentina	14
5	**Eduardo Vargas**	Chile	14
8	Ademir	Brazil	13
8	Gabriel Batistuta	Argentina	13
8	Jair	Brazil	13
8	José Manuel Moreno	Argentina	13
8	Héctor Scarone	Uruguay	13
13	Roberto Porta	Uruguay	12
13	Ángel Romano	Uruguay	12
15	Didi	Brazil	11
15	Herminio Masantonio	Argentina	11
17	Javier Ambrois	Uruguay	10
17	Héctor Castro	Uruguay	10
17	Enrique Hormazábal	Chile	10
17	Arnoldo Iguarán	Colombia	10
17	Ángel Labruna	Argentina	10
17	**Lautaro Martínez**	Argentina	10
17	Pedro Petrone	Uruguay	10
17	Ronaldo	Brazil	10
17	Óscar Gómez Sánchez	Peru	10

=== Assists provided ===
Rank	Player	Country	Assists
1	Lionel Messi	Argentina	18
2	Zizinho	Brazil	17
3	Jair	Brazil	9
3	James Rodríguez	Colombia	9
5	Alex	Brazil	8
6	Denílson	Brazil	7
6	Ángel Di María	Argentina	7
8	Juan Roman Riquelme	Argentina	6
8	Carlos Tevez	Argentina	6

=== Matches played ===
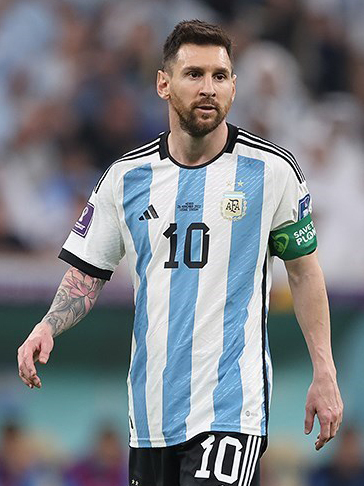
Argentine Lionel Messi has the record for most matches played (39) and for most assists made (18) in Copa América history.

Rank	Player	Country	Matches	Tournaments
1	Lionel Messi	Argentina	39	2007, 2011, 2015, 2016, 2019, 2021, 2024
2	Sergio Livingstone	Chile	34	1941, 1942, 1945, 1947, 1949, 1953
3	Zizinho	Brazil	33	1942, 1945, 1946, 1949, 1953, 1957
4	Víctor Ugarte	Bolivia	30	1947, 1949, 1953, 1959 (ARG)
5	Ángel Di María	Argentina	28	2011, 2015, 2016, 2019, 2021, 2024
5	**Paolo Guerrero**	Peru	28	2007, 2011, 2015, 2016, 2019, 2024
7	Leonel Álvarez	Colombia	27	1987, 1989, 1991, 1993, 1995
7	Claudio Bravo	Chile	27	2004, 2007, 2011, 2015, 2016, 2021, 2024
7	**Mauricio Isla**	Chile	27	2011, 2015, 2016, 2019, 2021, 2024
7	Gary Medel	Chile	27	2011, 2015, 2016, 2019, 2021
7	**Nicolás Otamendi**	Argentina	27	2015, 2016, 2019, 2021, 2024
7	Carlos Valderrama	Colombia	27	1987, 1989, 1991, 1993, 1995
7	Yoshimar Yotún	Peru	27	2011, 2015, 2016, 2019, 2021
14	**Pedro Gallese**	Peru	26	2015, 2016, 2019, 2021, 2024
14	Javier Mascherano	Argentina	26	2004, 2007, 2011, 2015, 2016
14	Alexis Sánchez	Chile	26	2011, 2015, 2016, 2019, 2021, 2024
14	**Eduardo Vargas**	Chile	26	2015, 2016, 2019, 2021, 2024
18	Álex Aguinaga	Ecuador	25	1987, 1989, 1991, 1993, 1995, 1999, 2001, 2004
18	**Christian Cueva**	Peru	25	2015, 2016, 2019, 2021, 2024
18	Cornelio Heredia	Peru	25	1947, 1949, 1953, 1955, 1956
18	Cláudio Taffarel	Brazil	25	1989, 1991, 1993, 1995, 1997

Data published by Copa América's official website.

=== Titles by player ===
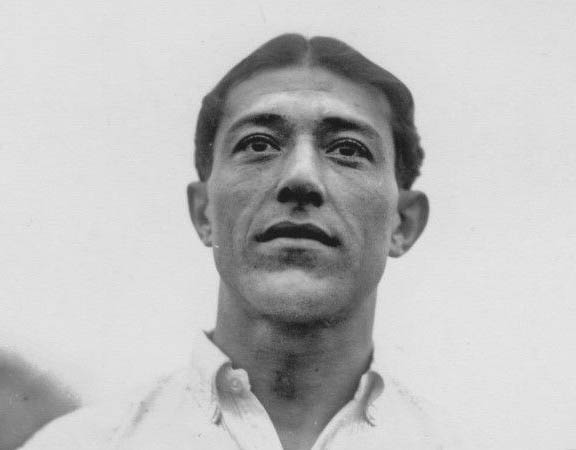
Uruguayan Ángel Romano won the tournament a record six times.

Players with the most Copa América titles
Titles	Player	Country	Years won	Other appearances	
Titles	Player	Country	Years won	As player	As manager
6	Ángel Romano	Uruguay	1916, 1917, 1920, 1923, 1924, 1926	1919, 1921, 1922	
4	Pascual Somma	Uruguay	1916, 1917, 1920, 1923	1919, 1921, 1922	
4	Héctor Scarone	Uruguay	1917, 1923, 1924, 1926	1919, 1927, 1929	
4	José Nasazzi	Uruguay	1923, 1924, 1926, 1935	1929	
3	Alfredo Foglino	Uruguay	1916, 1917, 1920	1919, 1921	
3	José Pérez	Uruguay	1916, 1917, 1920	1919	
3	José Piendibene	Uruguay	1916, 1917, 1920	1921	
3	Antonio Urdinarán	Uruguay	1916, 1917, 1920	1922	
3	José Vanzzino	Uruguay	1916, 1917, 1926	1919, 1922, 1927	
3	Alfredo Zibechi	Uruguay	1916, 1920, 1924	1919, 1921, 1922	
3	Andrade	Uruguay	1923, 1924, 1926	1927, 1929	
3	Alfredo Ghierra	Uruguay	1923, 1924, 1926		
3	Andrés Mazali	Uruguay	1923, 1924, 1926	1927, 1929	
3	Santos Urdinarán	Uruguay	1923, 1924, 1926		
3	Manuel Seoane	Argentina	1925, 1927, 1929	1924, 1935	1937
3	Vicente de la Mata	Argentina	1937, 1945, 1946		
3	José Salomón	Argentina	1941, 1945, 1946	1942	
3	Mario Boyé	Argentina	1945, 1946, 1947		
3	Félix Loustau	Argentina	1945, 1946, 1947		
3	Norberto Méndez	Argentina	1945, 1946, 1947		
3	Natalio Pescia	Argentina	1945, 1946, 1947		
3	René Pontoni	Argentina	1945, 1946, 1947		
3	Enzo Francescoli	Uruguay	1983, 1987, 1995	1989, 1993	

=== Individual records ===
- Most goals scored in a single tournament: **9** – (Brazil) Jair (1949), (Argentina) Humberto Maschio (1957) and (Uruguay) Javier Ambrois (1957)
- Most goals scored in a single match by a player: **5** – (Uruguay) Héctor Scarone (1926), (Argentina) Juan Marvezzi (1941), (Argentina) José Manuel Moreno (1942) and (Brazil) Evaristo (1957)
- Most tournaments scored in: **6** – (Brazil) Zizinho (1942, 1945, 1946, 1949, 1953, 1957) and (Argentina) Lionel Messi (2007, 2015, 2016, 2019, 2021, 2024)
- Most opponents scored against: **10 –** (Argentina) Lionel Messi (2007–2024)
- Most overall assists provided: **18** – (Argentina) Lionel Messi (2007–2024)
- Most assists provided in a single tournament: **6** – (Brazil) Alex (2004) and (Colombia) James Rodríguez (2024)
- Most matches won by a player: **25** – (Argentina) Lionel Messi (2007, 2011, 2015, 2016, 2019, 2021, 2024)
- Fastest goal scored: **after 50 seconds** – (Argentina) Darío Franco v Brazil (1991)
- Fastest hat-trick: **after 10 minutes** – (Argentina) José Manuel Moreno (1942)
- Youngest player: **16 years, 1 day** – (Chile) Humberto Elgueta v Brazil (1920)
- Oldest player: **41 years, 73 days** – (Chile) Claudio Bravo v Argentina (2024)
- Youngest goalscorer: **16 years, 171 days** – (Colombia) Johnnier Montaño v Argentina (1999)
- Oldest goalscorer: **37 years, 171 days** – (Uruguay) Luis Suárez v Canada (2024)
- Most overall direct free kicks scored: **4** – **(Argentina)** Lionel Messi (2007–2024)
- Most overall man of the match awards won: **15** – (Argentina) Lionel Messi (2007–2024)
- Most man of the match awards won in a single tournament: **4** – **(Argentina)** Lionel Messi (2015 and 2021)
- Most finals played in: **5** – **(Argentina)** Lionel Messi (2007, 2015, 2016, 2021, 2024)

== List of penalty shoot-outs ==
- Most shoot-outs won: 6
  - Uruguay (**1995**, 1999 (2), **2011**, 2024 (2))
- Most shoot-outs lost: 6
  - Uruguay (1993, 2001, 2004, 2007, 2019, 2021)
- Most shoot-outs played: 12
  - Uruguay (1993, **1995**, 1999 (2), 2001, 2004, 2007, **2011**, 2019, 2021, 2024 (2))

Penalty shoot-out statistics by team
Team	Played	Won	Lost	Winning %	Years won	Years lost
Uruguay	12	6	6	50%	**1995**, 1999 (2), **2011**, 2024 (2)	1993, 2001, 2004, 2007, 2019, 2021
Argentina	10	5	5	50%	**1993** (2), 2015, **2021**, **2024**	1995, 2004, 2011, 2015, 2016
Brazil	10	5	5	50%	1995, **2004** (2), **2007**, **2019**	1993, 1995, 2011, 2015, 2024
Colombia	8	4	4	50%	1993, 1995, 2016, 2021	1993, 2015, 2019, 2021
Paraguay	7	3	4	43%	2011 (2), 2015	1995, 1999, 2019, 2021
Chile	4	3	1	75%	**2015**, **2016**, 2019	1999
Peru	4	2	2	50%	2019, 2021	1999, 2016
Mexico	3	2	1	67%	1997, 1999	1995
Canada	2	1	1	50%	2024	2024
Ecuador	2	0	2	0%	–	1997, 2024
Venezuela	2	0	2	0%	–	2011, 2024
Honduras	1	1	0	100%	2001	–
United States	1	1	0	100%	1995	–

Championship year in bold

=== By chronological order ===
No.	Winners	Final score	Runners-up	Pen. Score	Pen. Taken	Missed penalties	Type of miss	Final penalty (Note: The outcome of the penalty after which the shoot-out ended. This column lists either the winning goalscorer, the player who missed the last penalty (if this was off target), or the player who took the last penalty and the goalkeeper who saved it)	Edition	Round	Date
1	Colombia	1–1	Uruguay	5–3	5–4	(Uruguay) Moas	Post	(penalty scored) Valencia	1993, Ecuador	Quarter-finals	26 June 1993
2	Argentina	1–1	Brazil	6–5	6–6	(Brazil) Boiadeiro	Saved	(penalty scored) Borelli	1993, Ecuador	Quarter-finals	27 June 1993
3	Argentina	0–0	Colombia	6–5	6–6	(Colombia) Aristizábal	Saved	(penalty scored) Borelli	1993, Ecuador	Semi-finals	1 July 1993
4	Colombia	1–1	Paraguay	5–4	5–5	(Paraguay) Gamarra	Saved	(penalty missed) Gamarra; GK Higuita	1995, Uruguay	Quarter-finals	16 July 1995
5	United States	0–0	Mexico	4–1	4–3	(Mexico) Hermosillo (Mexico) Coyote	Saved; Saved	(penalty scored) Klopas	1995, Uruguay	Quarter-finals	17 July 1995
6	Brazil	2–2	Argentina	4–2	5–4	(Brazil) André Cruz (Argentina) Simeone (Argentina) Fabbri	Saved; Saved; Saved	(penalty scored) Edmundo	1995, Uruguay	Quarter-finals	17 July 1995
7	Uruguay	1–1	Brazil	5–3	5–4	(Brazil) Túlio	Saved	(penalty scored) S. Martínez	1995, Uruguay	Final	23 July 1995
8	Mexico	1–1	Ecuador	4–3	6–6	(Ecuador) Capurro (Ecuador) De la Cruz (Mexico) Blanco (Mexico) Villa (Ecuador) Rosero	Saved; Saved; Saved; Wide; Saved	(penalty scored) J. Sánchez	1997, Bolivia	Quarter-finals	22 June 1997
9	Mexico	3–3	Peru	4–2	4–4	(Peru) José Soto (Peru) Reynoso	Over; Wide	(penalty missed) Reynoso	1999, Paraguay	Quarter-finals	10 July 1999
10	Uruguay	1–1	Paraguay	5–3	5–4	(Paraguay) Benítez	Saved/Post	(penalty scored) Magallanes	1999, Paraguay	Quarter-finals	10 July 1999
11	Uruguay	1–1	Chile	5–3	5–4	(Chile) Aros	Saved	(penalty scored) Magallanes	1999, Paraguay	Semi-finals	13 July 1999
12	Honduras	2–2	Uruguay	5–4	5–5	(Uruguay) Gutiérrez	Saved	(penalty scored) Izaguirre	2001, Colombia	Third place play-off	28 July 2001
13	Brazil	1–1	Uruguay	5–3	5–4	(Uruguay) V. Sánchez	Saved	(penalty scored) Alex	2004, Peru	Semi-finals	21 July 2004
14	Brazil	2–2	Argentina	4–2	4–4	(Argentina) D'Alessandro (Argentina) Heinze	Saved; Over	(penalty scored) Juan	2004, Peru	Final	25 July 2004
15	Brazil	2–2	Uruguay	5–4	7–7	(Uruguay) Forlán (Brazil) Afonso (Brazil) Fernando (Uruguay) García (Uruguay) Lugano	Saved; Post; Post; Post; Saved	(penalty missed) Lugano; GK Doni	2007, Venezuela	Semi-finals	10 July 2007
16	Uruguay	1–1	Argentina	5–4	5–5	(Argentina) Tevez	Saved	(penalty scored) Cáceres	2011, Argentina	Quarter-finals	16 July 2011
17	Paraguay	0–0	Brazil	2–0	3–4	(Brazil) Elano (Paraguay) Barreto (Brazil) Thiago Silva (Brazil) André Santos (Brazil) Fred	Over; Wide; Saved; Over; Wide	(penalty missed) Fred	2011, Argentina	Quarter-finals	17 July 2011
18	Paraguay	0–0	Venezuela	5–3	5–4	(Venezuela) Lucena	Saved	(penalty scored) Verón	2011, Argentina	Semi-finals	20 July 2011
19	Argentina	0–0	Colombia	5–4	7–7	(Colombia) Muriel (Argentina) Biglia (Colombia) Zúñiga (Argentina) Rojo (Colombia) Murillo	Over; Wide; Saved; Bar; Over	(penalty scored) Tevez	2015, Chile	Quarter-finals	26 June 2015
20	Paraguay	1–1	Brazil	4–3	5–5	(Brazil) E. Ribeiro (Brazil) Douglas Costa (Paraguay) Santa Cruz	Wide; Over; Over	(penalty scored) González	2015, Chile	Quarter-finals	27 June 2015
21	Chile	0–0	Argentina	4–1	4–3	(Argentina) Higuaín (Argentina) Banega	Over; Saved	(penalty scored) A. Sánchez	2015, Chile	Final	4 July 2015
22	Colombia	0–0	Peru	4–2	4–4	(Peru) Trauco (Peru) Cueva	Saved; Over	(penalty missed) Cueva	2016, United States	Quarter-finals	17 June 2016
23	Chile	0–0	Argentina	4–2	5–4	(Chile) Vidal (Argentina) Messi (Argentina) Biglia	Saved; Over; Saved	(penalty scored) Silva	2016, United States	Final	26 June 2016
24	Brazil	0–0	Paraguay	4–3	5–5	(Paraguay) Gómez (Brazil) Firmino (Paraguay) González	Saved; Wide; Wide	(penalty scored) Gabriel Jesus	2019, Brazil	Quarter-finals	27 June 2019
25	Chile	0–0	Colombia	5–4	5–5	(Colombia) Tesillo	Wide	(penalty scored) A. Sánchez	2019, Brazil	Quarter-finals	28 June 2019
26	Peru	0–0	Uruguay	5–4	5–5	(Uruguay) Suárez	Saved	(penalty scored) Flores	2019, Brazil	Quarter-finals	29 June 2019
27	Peru	3–3	Paraguay	4–3	6–6	(Paraguay) D. Martínez (Peru) Ormeño (Paraguay) Samudio (Peru) Cueva (Paraguay) Espínola	Over; Saved; Over; Saved; Saved	(penalty scored) Trauco	2021, Brazil	Quarter-finals	2 July 2021
28	Colombia	0–0	Uruguay	4–2	4–4	(Uruguay) Giménez (Uruguay) Viña	Saved; Saved	(penalty missed) Viña; GK Ospina	2021, Brazil	Quarter-finals	3 July 2021
29	Argentina	1–1	Colombia	3–2	4–5	(Colombia) D. Sánchez (Argentina) De Paul (Colombia) Mina (Colombia) Cardona	Saved; Over; Saved; Saved	(penalty missed) Cardona; GK E. Martínez	2021, Brazil	Semi-finals	6 July 2021
30	Argentina	1–1	Ecuador	4–2	5–4	(Argentina) Messi (Ecuador) Mena (Ecuador) Minda	Bar; Saved; Saved	(penalty scored) Otamendi	2024, United States	Quarter-finals	1 July 2024
31	Canada	1–1	Venezuela	4–3	6–6	(Venezuela) Herrera (Canada) Millar (Venezuela) Savarino (Canada) Eustáquio (Venezuela) Ángel	Post; Over; Saved; Saved; Saved	(penalty scored) Koné	2024, United States	Quarter-finals	5 July 2024
32	Uruguay	0–0	Brazil	4–2	5–4	(Brazil) Militão (Brazil) Douglas Luiz (Uruguay) Giménez	Saved; Post; Saved	(penalty scored) Ugarte	2024, United States	Quarter-finals	6 July 2024
33	Uruguay	2–2	Canada	4–3	4–5	(Canada) Koné (Canada) Davies	Saved; Bar	(penalty missed) Davies	2024, United States	Third place play-off	13 July 2024
