= 1947 Campeonato Paulista =

Campeonato Paulista
- Season: 1947
- Champions: Palmeiras
- Matches played: 110
- Goals scored: 393 (3.57 per match)
- Top goalscorer: Servílio (Corinthians) – 20 goals
- Biggest home win: Corinthians 8-0 Jabaquara (May 17, 1947)
- Biggest away win: Nacional 0-4 Corinthians (July 26, 1947); Comercial 1-5 Santos (September 20, 1947)
- Highest scoring: São Paulo 7-2 Juventus (June 22, 1947)

The 1947 Campeonato Paulista da Primeira Divisão, organized by the Federação Paulista de Futebol, was the 46th season of São Paulo's top professional football league. Palmeiras won the title for the 11th time. No teams were relegated. As in the last edition of the tournament, the top scorer was Corinthians's Servílio with 20 goals.

== Championship ==
The championship was disputed in a double-round robin system, with the team with the most points winning the title.

Pos	Team	Pld	W	D	L	GF	GA	GD	Pts	Qualification or relegation
1	Palmeiras	20	17	2	1	51	16	+35	36	Champions
2	Corinthians	20	14	4	2	54	19	+35	32	
3	Portuguesa	20	11	5	4	43	28	+15	27	
4	São Paulo	20	8	9	3	48	27	+21	25	
5	Ypiranga	20	9	3	8	36	26	+10	21	
6	Santos	20	6	7	7	33	27	+6	19	
7	Juventus	20	5	6	9	29	45	−16	16	
8	Portuguesa Santista	20	6	3	11	27	42	−15	15	
9	Comercial	20	5	1	14	25	59	−34	11	
10	Nacional	20	3	4	13	25	47	−22	10	
11	Jabaquara	20	2	4	14	22	57	−35	8	

Updated to match(es) played on January 11, 1948. Source: RSSSF.com
Rules for classification: 1) points; 2) goal difference; 3) wins; 4) head-to-head points.

== Top Scores ==
Rank	Player	Club	Goals
1	Servílio	Corinthians	20
2	Lula	Palmeiras	17
3	Pinga	Portuguesa	12
4	Canhotinho	Palmeiras	11
5	Leopoldo	São Paulo	10
5	Oswaldinho	Palmeiras	10
5	Simão	Portuguesa	10
8	Cláudio	Corinthians	9
8	Baltazar	Corinthians	9
8	Nininho	Portuguesa	9
11	Antoninho	Santos	8
11	Adolfrises	Santos	8
