= 1954 Campeonato Profesional =

Campeonato Profesional
- Season: 1954
- Champions: Atlético Nacional (1st title)
- Matches: 90
- Goals: 349 (3.88 per match)
- Top goalscorer: Carlos Gambina (21)
- Biggest home win: Atlético Nacional 8–1 Unión Magdalena
- Biggest away win: Santa Fe 2–8 Atlético Nacional; Santa Fe 0–6 Atlético Quindío
- Highest scoring: Santa Fe 2–8 Atlético Nacional

The 1954 Campeonato Profesional was the seventh season of Colombia's top-flight football league. 10 teams compete against one another and played each weekend. The tournament was notable for being the sixth and last year of El Dorado. Atlético Nacional won the league for 1st time in its history after getting 31 points. Millonarios, the defending champion, was 5th with 18 points.

== Background ==
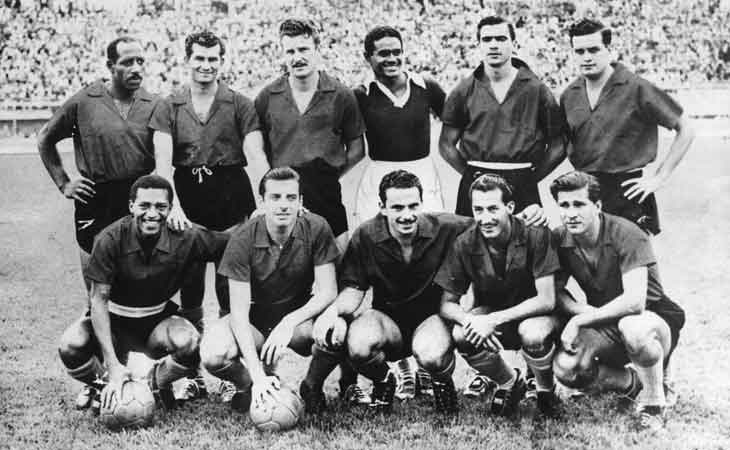
The starting lineup of Atlético Nacional in 1954

The tournament was the sixth and last year of El Dorado. The Pacto de Lima with the FIFA forced the foreign players to return to their countries in October. It was a very irregular tournament in which four matches were not played and seven were suspended by walkover.

10 teams competed in the tournament, two less than the previous year: Atlético Bucaramanga, Cúcuta Deportivo, Deportivo Pereira and Junior withdrew due to financial problems, Sporting de Barranquilla was dissolved, while América de Cali and Independiente Medellín return to the tournament. Atlético Manizales come in as the only new team. Atlético Nacional won the championship for first time, losing only against Boca Juniors de Cali through the tournament.

== League system ==
Every team played two games against each other team, one at home and one away. Teams received two points for a win and one point for a draw. If two or more teams were tied on points, places were determined by goal difference. The team with the most points is the champion of the league.

== Teams ==
Locations of the 1954 Campeonato Profesional teams:
- 1. Armenia
- 2. Bogotá
- 3. Cali
- 4. Manizales
- 5. Medellín
- 6. Santa Marta

Team	City	Stadium
América	Cali	Estadio Francisco Rivera Escobar^{a}
Atlético Manizales	Manizales	Estadio Palogrande
Atlético Nacional	Medellín	Estadio Atanasio Girardot
Atlético Quindío	Armenia	Estadio San José de Armenia
Boca Juniors	Cali	Estadio Olímpico Pascual Guerrero
Deportivo Cali	Cali	Estadio Olímpico Pascual Guerrero
Independiente Medellín	Medellín	Estadio San Fernando
Millonarios	Bogotá	Estadio El Campín
Santa Fe	Bogotá	Estadio El Campín
Unión Magdalena	Santa Marta	Estadio Eduardo Santos

^{a} América played its home games at Palmira

== Final standings ==
Pos	Team	Pld	W	D	L	GF	GA	GD	Pts
1	Atlético Nacional (C)	18	14	3	1	58	26	+32	31
2	Quindío	18	11	3	4	56	27	+29	25
3	Independiente Medellín	18	11	2	5	48	24	+24	24
4	Atlético Manizales	18	8	4	6	31	34	−3	20
5	Millonarios	17	7	4	6	31	28	+3	18
6	Boca Juniors	16	6	3	7	32	32	0	15
7	América	18	4	7	7	33	47	−14	15
8	Unión Magdalena	17	5	2	10	20	36	−16	12
9	Deportivo Cali	17	2	3	12	24	44	−20	7
10	Santa Fe	15	1	3	11	16	51	−35	5

Source: RSSSF
(C) Champions

=== Results ===
Home \ Away	AME	BJ	CAL	MAG	MAN	MED	MIL	NAC	QUI	SFE
América		1–5	2–1	4–2	1–1	1–1	2–2	2–6	2–2	6–1
Boca Juniors	4–1		2–2	1–0 (Note: Matches that Unión Magdalena and Boca Juniors de Cali didn't play.)	0–2	1–4	2–2	2–2	2–4	– (Note: Matches not played.)
Deportivo Cali	3–3	0–2		1–0	2–1	0–1	1–3	3–4	1–3	2–1
Unión Magdalena	1–0	4–2	3–0		1–2	1–0	0–1	0–1	1–4	2–2
Atlético Manizales	0–0	0–4	5–2	1–0		2–5	2–0	2–5	2–2	2–2
Medellín	6–1	3–1	4–2	1–0	6–1		0–2	2–2	5–4	6–0
Millonarios	1–2	1–0	2–2	–	2–4	2–1		1–1	3–5	6–0
Atlético Nacional	5–2	3–4	2–1	8–1	2–1	1–0	3–2		1–0	2–0
Atlético Quindío	3–3	3–0	5–2	6–0	0–1	2–1	3–0	1–2		3–1
Santa Fe	3–0	–	–	3–3	0–2	1–2	0–1	2–8	0–6	

Legend: Blue = home team win; Yellow = draw; Red = away team win.

=== Top goalscorers ===
Rank	Name	Club	Goals
1	(Argentina) Carlos Gambina	Atlético Nacional	21
2	(Uruguay) Antonio Sacco	Independiente Medellín	19
3	(Argentina) Mario Garelli	Atlético Quindío	14
4	(Argentina) Rubén Padín	Atlético Manizales	11
4	(Argentina) Alberto Cazaubón	Atlético Quindío	11
6	(Peru) Alfredo Mosquera	Atlético Nacional	10
6	(Argentina) Roberto Urruti	Atlético Quindío	10
8	(Socialist Federal Republic of Yugoslavia) Antony Franjić	Santa Fe	9
8	(Colombia) Fernando Rengifo	Boca Juniors	9
10	(Argentina) Elger Alarcón	Atlético Quindío	8

Source: RSSSF.com Colombia 1954
