= Manuel Salamanca =

Chilean footballer (1927-2010)

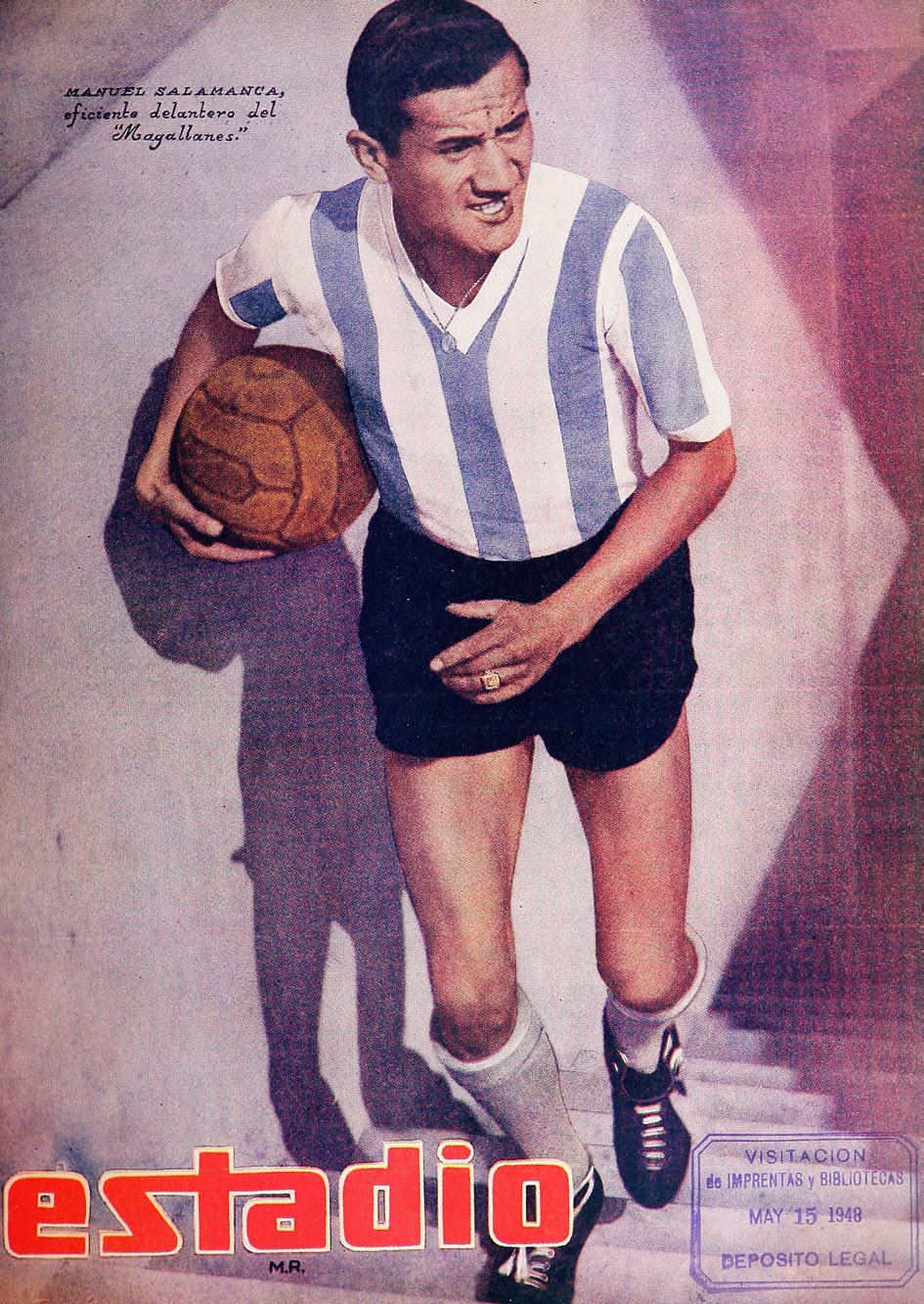

Personal information
- Full name: Héctor Manuel Salamanca Montano
- Date of birth: 29 July 1927
- Place of birth: Puente Alto, Chile
- Date of death: 5 October 2010 (aged 83)
- Position: Midfielder

International career
Years	Team	Apps	(Gls)
1949	Chile	3	(1)

Manuel Salamanca (29 July 1927 – 5 October 2010) was a Chilean footballer. He played in three matches for the Chile national football team in 1949. He was also part of Chile's squad for the 1949 South American Championship.
