= Benedicto Godoy =

Bolivian footballer (born 1924)

Personal information
- Full name: Benedicto Godoy Véizaga
- Date of birth: 28 July 1924
- Place of birth: La Paz, Bolivia
- Position: Forward

Senior career*
Years	Team	Apps	(Gls)
- Ferroviario La Paz

International career
- Bolivia
- * Club domestic league appearances and goals

Benedicto Godoy Véizaga (born 28 July 1924, date of death unknown) was a Bolivian football who played as a forward for Bolivia in the 1950 FIFA World Cup. Godoy is deceased.

== Career ==
Godoy scored two goals at the 1949 South American Championship. He also played for Ferroviario La Paz.
