= Alfredo Mosquera =

Peruvian footballer (1924–2001)

Personal information
- Full name: Carlos Alfredo Mosquera Zegarra
- Date of birth: 15 February 1924
- Place of birth: Chincha Alta, Peru
- Date of death: 10 June 2001 (aged 77)
- Position: Forward

Senior career*
Years	Team	Apps	(Gls)
1943	Ciclista Lima		
1944	Alfonso Ugarte de Chiclín		
1945–1948	Sporting Tabaco		
1949–1952	Millonarios F.C.	?	(24)
1953–1955	Atlético Nacional		
1956–1957	Deportes Tolima		
1958	Sporting Cristal		
1959	Porvenir Miraflores		

International career
1949	Peru	7	(3)
- * Club domestic league appearances and goals

Carlos Alfredo Mosquera Zegarra (15 February 1924 – 10 June 2001) was a Peruvian footballer. He is the father of Roberto Mosquera, also a footballer.

== Biography ==
=== Club career ===
Playing as a striker, Alfredo Mosquera made a name for himself in Colombia with Millonarios F.C., where he played between 1949 and 1952 alongside Alfredo Di Stefano and Adolfo Pedernera. He won the Colombian championship three times there, in 1949, 1951, and 1952. After leaving Millonarios, he joined Atlético Nacional and won the championship in 1954.

After a final stint in Colombia with Deportes Tolima between 1956 and 1957, he returned permanently to Peru in 1958 to play for Sporting Cristal.

=== International career ===
Called up to the Peruvian national team in 1949, Mosquera played in the 1949 South American Championship in Brazil. He played 7 matches and scored 3 goals.

== Honours ==
Millonarios F.C.

- Campeonato Profesional (3): 1949, 1951, 1952

Atlético Nacional

- Campeonato Profesional: 1954
