= Danilo Alvim =

Brazilian footballer and manager (1920-1996)

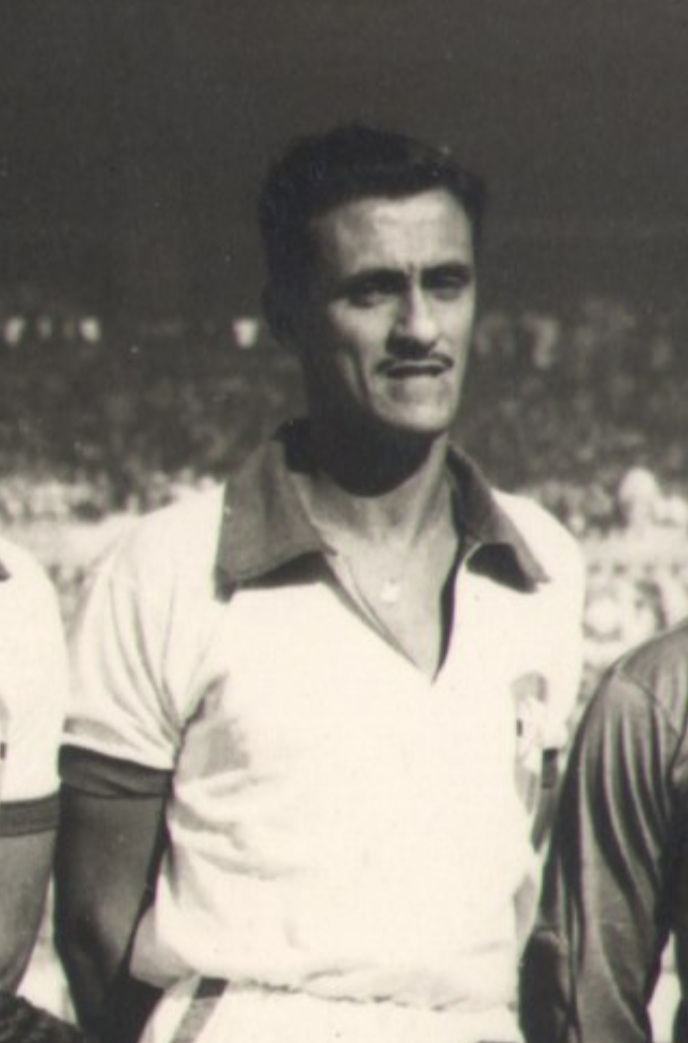
- Danilo Alvim with the Brazil national football team in the 1950 FIFA World Cup

Personal information
- Full name: Danilo Alvim Faria
- Date of birth: 3 December 1920
- Place of birth: Rio de Janeiro, Brazil
- Date of death: May 16, 1996 (aged 75)
- Place of death: Rio de Janeiro, Brazil
- Position: Defensive midfielder

Senior career*
Years	Team	Apps	(Gls)
1939–1942	America-RJ		
1943	Canto do Rio		
1944–1945	America-RJ		
1946–1954	Vasco da Gama		
1955–1956	Botafogo		

International career
1945–1953	Brazil	25	(2)

Managerial career
- 1956–1957: Uberaba
- 1961–1962: São Cristóvão
- 1963: Botafogo
- 1963–1965: Bolivia
- 1968–1970: Remo
- 1974–1975: America-RJ
- 1978: Náutico
- 1981: Galícia
- 1981: Itabaiana
Medal record
Men's Football
Representing Brazil (as player)
FIFA World Cup
Runner-up	1950 Brazil
South American Championship
Winner	1949 Brazil
Runner-up	1945 Chile
Runner-up	1946 Argentina
Runner-up	1953 Peru
Representing Bolivia (as manager)
Copa América
Winner	1963 Bolivia
- * Club domestic league appearances and goals

Danilo Alvim Faria (3 December 1920 – 16 May 1996) was a Brazilian footballer. He was a member of the ill-fated Brazil national team in the 1950 FIFA World Cup. Considered to be one of the greatest defensive midfielders in the world during his prime, he was renowned as a very sophisticated and elegant player who possessed fine ball control and accurate long range passing.

== Club career ==
Danilo Alvim was an amateur playing with America-RJ when Flávio Costa's Rio de Janeiro squad practiced against them in 1941. He was asked to fill in for one of the injured players and so impressed the famous coach that he was asked to join the squad. At first he thought it was a joke, but when he realized it was true he went out to celebrate. On his way back home he was hit by a car and had his leg broken (in 39 places according to some sources).

In 1942 he came back to America and was cut by the manager to save costs. Rather than cutting him outright the team's directors sent him to Canto do Rio where he led the team to a Rio de Janeiro championship. He was promptly recalled to America as well as the Rio de Janeiro state team that Flávio Costa had invited him to join before his accident. In 1946 he joined Vasco de Gama and became a huge part of the "expresso da vitória" (the victory express), one of Brazil's best ever club teams and the first to win an international title (the South American club championship in 1948 — before the Copa Libertadores came to be). Danilo retired while playing for Botafogo. He was known as "Prince" due to the characteristic elegance of his style of play.

== International career ==
He played 25 games with 2 goals between 1945 and 1953, winning the 1949 Copa América. He was a starter for the famous 1950 World Cup team, unjustly remembered for losing the last game to Uruguay, despite being one of Brazil's best ever squads. Brazil only needed to draw Uruguay to win the 1950 FIFA World Cup at the Maracanã stadium. Uruguay came from a goal down to win the match 2-1. This defeat is remembered today as the Maracanaço. It is considered one of two Brazilian sport's worst disasters in history, next to fatal accident of Ayrton Senna in the 1994 San Marino Grand Prix. Danilo is, till today, considered one of Brazil's most complete centre-halves and, by some, a top 10 among Brazil's craques. Just as Ademir, Zizinho, Jair and others on the 1950 team, he would likely be regarded even more highly if it were not for that one day in the Maracanã stadium.

== Managerial career ==
After ending his playing career and revealing that ever since his accident he could never fully extend or bend his right leg, Danilo became a coach. In 1963, he led Bolivia to their only title – Copa América – with a 5-4 win over Brazil along the way. He became the first non-native coach of a winning Copa América team since Jack Greenwell led Peru to victory in 1939.

== Honours ==
=== Player ===
Vasco da Gama

- Campeonato Sul-Americano de Campeões: 1948
- Campeonato Carioca: 1947, 1949, 1950, 1952
- Torneio Octogonal Rivadavia Correa Meyer: 1953

Brazil

- Copa América: 1949
- FIFA World Cup runner-up: 1950

Individual

- Torneio Octogonal Rivadavia Correa Meyer Team of the Tournament: 1953

=== Manager ===
Bolivia

- Copa América: 1963

Remo

- Campeonato Paraense: 1968

Itabaiana

- Campeonato Sergipano: 1981
