= Celestino Algarañaz =

Bolivian footballer (born 1926)

Personal information
- Full name: Víctor Celestino Algarañaz
- Date of birth: 6 April 1926
- Place of birth: Bolivia
- Height: 1.70 m (5 ft 7 in)
- Position: Forward

Senior career*
Years	Team	Apps	(Gls)
1948–1951	Club Litoral		

International career
1949–1950	Bolivia	9	(1)
- * Club domestic league appearances and goals

Víctor Celestino Algarañaz (born 6 April 1926, date of death unknown) was a Bolivian football forward who played for Bolivia in the 1950 FIFA World Cup. He also played for Club Litoral. Algarañaz is deceased.
