= Duilio Benítez =

Paraguayan footballer (born 1927)

Duilio Benitez
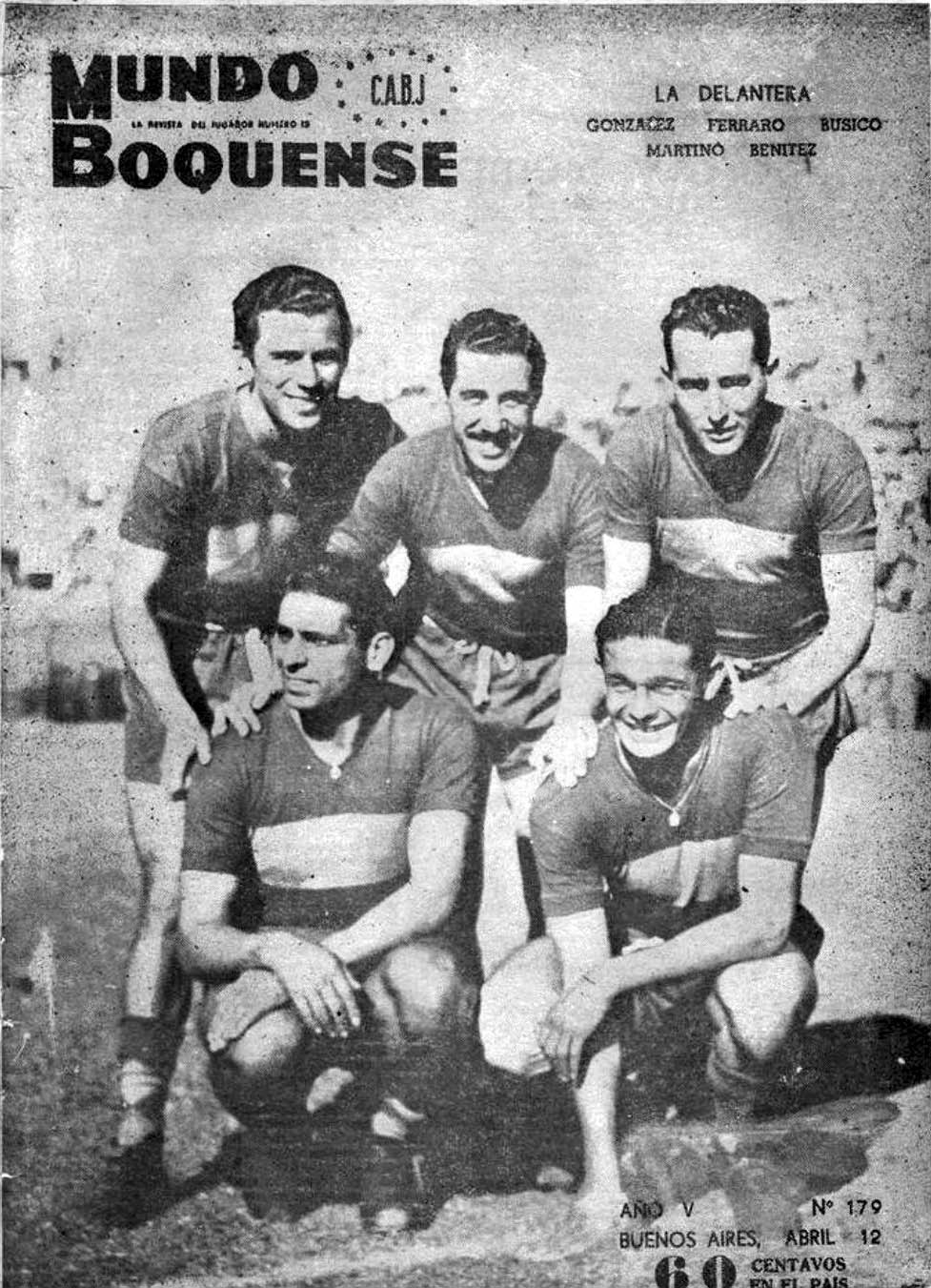

Personal information
- Full name: Jorge Duilio Benitez Candia
- Date of birth: 23 April 1927
- Place of birth: Yaguarón, Paraguay
- Position: Attacking midfielder

Senior career*
| Years | Team | Apps | (Gls) |
| 1945–1949 | Nacional | | |
| 1949–1951 | Boca Juniors | 44 | (18) |
| 1952–1956 | Flamengo | 56 | (43) |
| 1956–1957 | Náutico | 18 | (15) |
| 1958–1959 | Club Almagro | 21 | (11) |
| 1960 | Deportivo Morón | 4 | (2) |

International career
| 1949 | Paraguay | 7 | (7) |
- * Club domestic league appearances and goals

Jorge Duílio Benítez Candia (born 23 April 1927) is a former Paraguayan football attacking midfielder.

== Career ==
Benítez holds the all-time highest goalscorer record for Paraguay in a single match: Four goals against Bolivia in the 1949 South American Championship.

Benítez suffered from heart problems, thus when he signed with Argentine club Boca Juniors in 1949 a clause in his contract specified that he was the sole responsible for the risks of playing with such condition.

In the years 1956 e 1957, played for Náutico. Despite not having won any title in the lands of Pernambuco, stood out next to the attacker Ivson.

== Honours ==
=== Club ===
Nacional

- Primera División: 1946

Boca Juniors

- Primera División: Runners-up 1950

Flamengo

- Campeonato Carioca: 1953, 1954, 1955

=== International ===
South American Championship: Runners-up 1949
