= Ernesto Fígoli =

Uruguayan football manager (1888–1951)

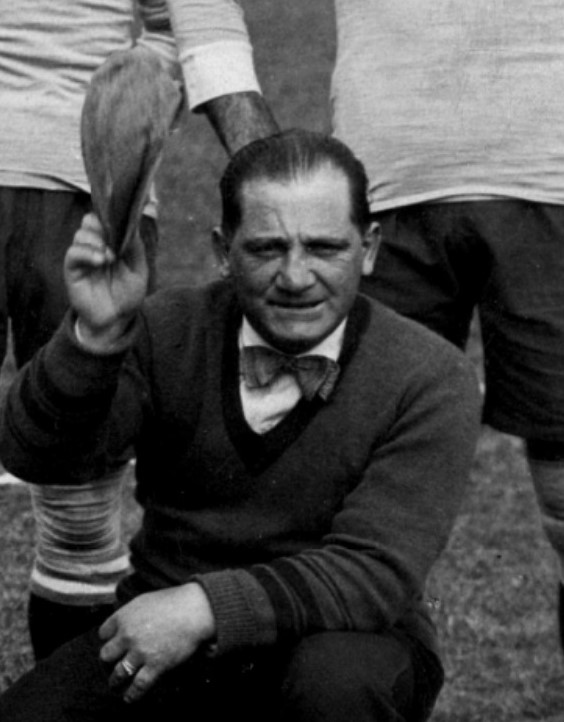
- Fígoli in 1928

Personal information
- Date of birth: 21 August 1888
- Date of death: 26 July 1951 (aged 62)

Managerial career
- Years: Team
- 1920–1922: Uruguay
- 1924: Uruguay
- 1926: Uruguay

Ernesto Fígoli (21 August 1888 – 26 July 1951), nicknamed "Matucho", was a Uruguayan football manager. He managed Uruguay to victory in the 1920 and 1926 South American Championships, and to the gold medal at the 1924 Olympics. Later, he contributed to Uruguay's 1928 Olympics gold medal and 1930 and 1950 FIFA World Cup wins as masseur and kinesiologist.
