= 1949 South American Championship =

Football tournament

Tournament details
- Host country: Brazil
- Dates: 3 April – 11 May
- Teams: 8 (from 1 confederation)
- Venue: 5 (in 4 host cities)

Final positions
- Champions: Brazil (3rd title)
- Runners-up: Paraguay
- Third place: Peru
- Fourth place: Bolivia

Tournament statistics
- Matches played: 29
- Goals scored: 135 (4.66 per match)
- Top scorer(s): (Brazil) Jair (9 goals)

The 1949 South American Championship was the 21st edition of the Copa América, the main national team football competition in South America. It was held in, and won by, Brazil. Paraguay finished as runner-up while Argentina withdrew from the tournament.

This achievement ended a 27-year streak without official titles for the Brazilians. The last one had been in the 1922 South American Championship, also played on Brazilian soil. Jair Rosa Pinto from Brazil was the top scorer of the tournament, with nine goals.

== Squads ==
For a complete list of participating squads, see: 1949 South American Championship squads

== Venues ==
| Rio de Janeiro | | São Paulo | Santos | Belo Horizonte |
|---|---|---|---|---|
| Estádio General Severiano | Estádio São Januário | Estádio do Pacaembu | Estádio Vila Belmiro | Estádio Sete de Setembro |
| Capacity: 30,000 | Capacity: 25,000 | Capacity: 71,281 | Capacity: 16,798 | Capacity: 30,000 |
1949 South American Championship is located in Brazil

== Final round ==
| Team | Pld | W | D | L | GF | GA | GD | Pts |
|---|---|---|---|---|---|---|---|---|
| Brazil | 7 | 6 | 0 | 1 | 39 | 7 | +32 | 12 |
| Paraguay | 7 | 6 | 0 | 1 | 21 | 6 | +15 | 12 |
| Peru | 7 | 5 | 0 | 2 | 20 | 13 | +7 | 10 |
| Bolivia | 7 | 4 | 0 | 3 | 13 | 24 | −11 | 8 |
| Chile | 7 | 2 | 1 | 4 | 10 | 14 | −4 | 5 |
| Uruguay | 7 | 2 | 1 | 4 | 14 | 20 | −6 | 5 |
| Ecuador | 7 | 1 | 0 | 6 | 7 | 21 | −14 | 2 |
| Colombia | 7 | 0 | 2 | 5 | 4 | 23 | −19 | 2 |

3 April 1949

| Brazil | 9–1 | Ecuador |
|---|---|---|
| Tesourinha 3', 42'; Octavio 10'; Jair 13', 35'; Simão 16', 25'; Zizinho 67'; Ademir 88' | | Sigifredo Cuchuca 18' |

Estádio São Januário, Rio de Janeiro
Attendance: 35,000
Referee: Cyril Jack Barrick (England)

6 April 1949

| Bolivia | 3–2 | Chile |
|---|---|---|
| Ugarte 59'; Godoy 77'; Gutiérrez 79' | | Riera 30'; Salamanca 71' |

Estádio do Pacaembu, São Paulo
Attendance: 30,000
Referee: Cyril Jack Barrick (England)

6 April 1949

| Paraguay | 3–0 | Colombia |
|---|---|---|
| López Fretes 21', 72'; Benítez 35' |

Estádio do Pacaembu, São Paulo
Attendance: 30,000
Referee: Juan Carlos Armental (Uruguay)

10 April 1949

| Peru | 4–0 | Colombia |
|---|---|---|
| Pedraza 22', 90'; Drago 47'; Castillo 85' |

Estádio São Januário, Rio de Janeiro
Attendance: 15,000
Referee: Mario Rubén Heyn (Paraguay)

10 April 1949

| Paraguay | 1–0 | Ecuador |
|---|---|---|
| Barrios 89' |

Estádio do Pacaembu, São Paulo
Attendance: 15,000
Referee: Juan Carlos Armental (Uruguay)

10 April 1949

| Brazil | 10–1 | Bolivia |
|---|---|---|
| Nininho 16', 39', 86'; Jair 17'; Zizinho 25', 80'; Cláudio 49', 84'; Simão 71', 79' | | Ugarte 75' |

Estádio do Pacaembu, São Paulo
Attendance: 40,000
Referee: Cyril Jack Barrick (England)

13 April 1949

| Brazil | 2–1 | Chile |
|---|---|---|
| Zizinho 20'; Cláudio 49' (pen.) | | López 89' (pen.); Flores (red card) 40' |

Estádio do Pacaembu, São Paulo
Attendance: 45,000
Referee: Juan Carlos Armental (Uruguay)

13 April 1949

| Uruguay | 3–2 | Ecuador |
|---|---|---|
| Castro 15', 85'; Moreno 30' | | Artega 35'; Vargas 40' |

Estádio São Januário, Rio de Janeiro
Attendance: 30,000
Referee: Alberto Da Gama Malcher (Brazil)

13 April 1949

| Paraguay | 3–1 | Peru |
|---|---|---|
| Barrios 38' (pen.); Arce 56'; López Fretes 67' | | Drago 89' |

Estádio São Januário, Rio de Janeiro
Attendance: 30,000
Referee: Cyril Jack Barrick (England)

17 April 1949

| Brazil | 5–0 | Colombia |
|---|---|---|
| Tesourinha 20'; Canhotinho 24' (pen.); Orlando 44'; Ademir 47', 87' |

Estádio do Pacaembu, São Paulo
Attendance: 45,000
Referee: Alejandro Gálvez (Chile)

17 April 1949

| Chile | 1–0 | Ecuador |
|---|---|---|
| Rojas 4' |

Estádio do Pacaembu, São Paulo
Attendance: 8,000
Referee: Cyril Jack Barrick (England)

17 April 1949

| Bolivia | 3–2 | Uruguay |
|---|---|---|
| Ugarte 47' (pen.); Algarañaz 57'; Gutiérrez 66' | | Moll 49'; Betancourt 70' |

Estádio São Januário, Rio de Janeiro
Attendance: 8,000
Referee: Alberto Da Gama Malcher (Brazil)

20 April 1949

| Peru | 4–0 | Ecuador |
|---|---|---|
| Salinas 26'; Bermeo 36' (o.g.) (red card); Castillo 50'; Pedraza 85' |

Estádio São Januário, Rio de Janeiro
Attendance: 7,000
Referee: Juan Carlos Armental (Uruguay)

20 April 1949

| Chile | 1–1 | Colombia |
|---|---|---|
| López 8' | | Berdugo 56' |

Estádio São Januário, Rio de Janeiro
Attendance: 7,000
Referee: Mário Gardelli (Brazil)

20 April 1949

| Uruguay | 2–1 | Paraguay |
|---|---|---|
| García 22', 69' | | Arce 65' (pen.) |

Estádio do Pacaembu, São Paulo
Attendance: 20,000
Referee: Cyril Jack Barrick (England)

24 April 1949

| Brazil | 7–1 | Peru |
|---|---|---|
| Arce 11' (o.g.); Augusto 15'; Jair 17', 20'; Simão 54'; Ademir 82'; Orlando 88'; Zizinho (red card) 40' | | Salinas 44'; Calderón (red card) 40'; González (red card) |

Estádio São Januário, Rio de Janeiro
Attendance: 45,000
Referee: Cyril Jack Barrick (England)

25 April 1949

| Bolivia | 2–0 | Ecuador |
|---|---|---|
| Sánchez 6' (o.g.); Ugarte 14' (pen.) |

Estádio do Pacaembu, São Paulo
Attendance: 14,000
Referee: Mário Gardelli (Brazil)

25 April 1949

| Uruguay | 2–2 | Colombia |
|---|---|---|
| Martínez 57'; Ayala 86' | | Gastelbondo 27'; A. Pérez 81' |

Estádio do Pacaembu, São Paulo
Attendance: 14,000
Referee: Alberto Da Gama Malcher (Brazil)

27 April 1949

| Peru | 3–0 | Bolivia |
|---|---|---|
| R. Drago 31', 74'; Heredia 77' (pen.) |

Estádio Vila Belmiro, Santos
Attendance: 12,000
Referee: Alberto Da Gama Malcher (Brazil)

27 April 1949

| Paraguay | 4–2 | Chile |
|---|---|---|
| Arce 10', 39', 47'; Benítez 23' | | Cremaschi 8'; Ramos 72' |

Estádio do Pacaembu, São Paulo
Attendance: 1,000
Referee: Mário Gardelli (Brazil)

30 April 1949

| Paraguay | 7–0 | Bolivia |
|---|---|---|
| Benítez 30', 40', 41', ?'; Arce 38', ?'; Fernández 59' |

Estádio São Januário, Rio de Janeiro
Attendance: 45,000
Referee: Cyril Jack Barrick (England)

30 April 1949

| Brazil | 5–1 | Uruguay |
|---|---|---|
| Jair 15', 40' (pen.); Zizinho 24'; Danilo Alvim 79'; Tesourinha 89' (pen.) | | Castro 12' |

Estádio São Januário, Rio de Janeiro
Attendance: 45,000
Referee: Alberto Da Gama Malcher (Brazil)

30 April 1949

| Peru | 3–0 | Chile |
|---|---|---|
| Mosquera 28', 73'; Castillo 58' |

Estádio do Pacaembu, São Paulo
Attendance: 1,000
Referee: Mário Gardelli (Brazil)

3 May 1949

| Ecuador | 4–1 | Colombia |
|---|---|---|
| E. Cantos 23'; Vargas 44'; G. Andrade 49'; Maldonado 74' | | N. Pérez 27' |

Estádio São Januário, Rio de Janeiro
Attendance: 3,000
Referee: Alfredo Alvarez (Bolivia)

4 May 1949

| Peru | 4–3 | Uruguay |
|---|---|---|
| Mosquera 19'; Castillo 43'; Gómez Sánchez 57', 60' | | Moll 58'; Castro 60'; Ayala 85' |

Estádio General Severiano, Rio de Janeiro
Attendance: 20,000
Referee: Alfredo Alvarez (Bolivia)

6 May 1949

| Bolivia | 4–0 | Colombia |
|---|---|---|
| Godoy 10'; B. Gutiérrez 55'; Rojas 77'; Ugarte 81' |

Estádio General Severiano, Rio de Janeiro
Attendance: 12,000
Referee: Cyril Jack Barrick (England)

8 May 1949

| Chile | 3–1 | Uruguay |
|---|---|---|
| Infante 75', 83' (pen.); Cremaschi 88' | | Ayala 35' |

Estádio Sete de Setembro, Belo Horizonte
Attendance: 5,000
Referee: Mário Gardelli (Brazil)

8 May 1949

| Paraguay | 2–1 | Brazil |
|---|---|---|
| Avalos 75'; Benítez 85' | | Tesourinha 33' |

Estádio São Januário, Rio de Janeiro
Attendance: 35,000
Referee: Cyril Jack Barrick (England)

=== Play-off ===
A playoff match was played between Brazil and Paraguay to determine the champion.

11 May 1949

| Brazil | 7–0 | Paraguay |
|---|---|---|
| Ademir 17', 27', 48'; Tesourinha 43', 70'; Jair 72', 89' |

Estádio São Januário, Rio de Janeiro
Attendance: 55,000
Referee: Cyril John Barrick (England)

== Result ==
1949 South American Championship champions

Brazil
3rd title

== Goalscorers ==
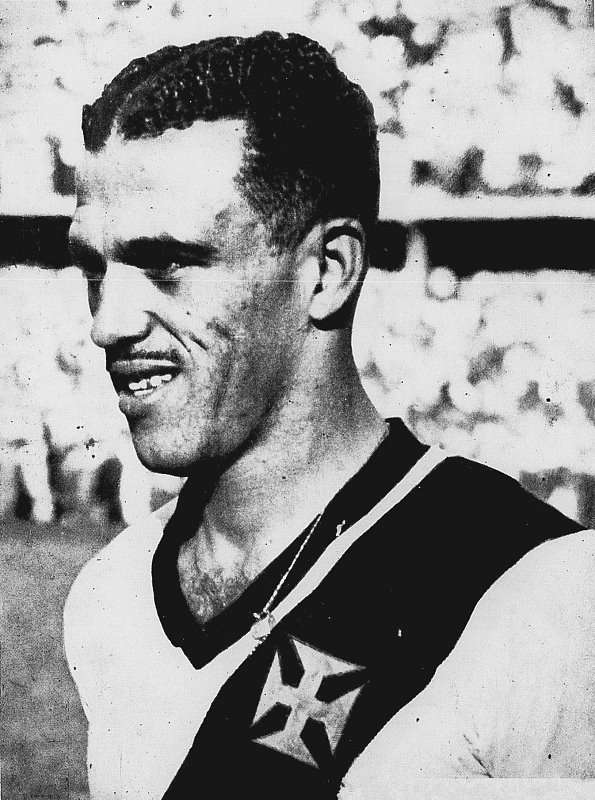
Jair, top scorer

9 goals

- (Brazil) Jair

7 goals

- (Brazil) Ademir
- (Brazil) Tesourinha
- (Paraguay) Arce
- (Paraguay) Benítez

5 goals

- (Bolivia) Víctor Ugarte
- (Brazil) Simão
- (Brazil) Zizinho

4 goals

- (Peru) Félix Castillo
- (Uruguay) Ramón Castro

3 goals

- (Bolivia) Benigno Gutiérrez
- (Brazil) Cláudio
- (Brazil) Nininho
- (Paraguay) López Fretes
- (Peru) Alfredo Mosquera
- (Peru) Víctor Pedraza
- (Peru) Roberto Drago
- (Uruguay) Juan Ayala

2 goals

- (Bolivia) Benedicto Godoy
- (Brazil) Orlando
- (Chile) Atilio Cremaschi
- (Chile) Raimundo Infante
- (Chile) Pedro López
- (Ecuador) José Vargas
- (Paraguay) Marcial Barrios
- (Peru) Carlos Gómez Sánchez
- (Peru) Juan E. Salinas
- (Uruguay) José M. García
- (Uruguay) Dagoberto Moll

1 goal

- (Bolivia) Víctor Algarañaz
- (Bolivia) Nemesio Rojas
- (Brazil) Augusto
- (Brazil) Canhotinho
- (Brazil) Danilo Alvim
- (Brazil) Octavio
- (Chile) Ulises Ramos
- (Chile) Fernando Riera
- (Chile) Carlos Rojas
- (Chile) Manuel Salamanca
- (Colombia) A. Pérez
- (Colombia) Berdugo
- (Colombia) Gastelbondo
- (Colombia) Nelson Pérez
- (Ecuador) Víctor Arteaga
- (Ecuador) Sigifredo Chuchuca
- (Ecuador) Enrique Cantos
- (Ecuador) Guido Andrade
- (Ecuador) Rafael Maldonado
- (Paraguay) Enrique Avalos
- (Paraguay) Pedro Fernández
- (Peru) Cornelio Heredia
- (Peru) Manuel Drago
- (Uruguay) Ernesto Bentancour
- (Uruguay) Miguel Martínez
- (Uruguay) Nelson Moreno

Own goals

- (Ecuador) Bermeo (for Peru)
- (Ecuador) Sánchez (for Bolivia)
- (Peru) Arce (for Brazil)
