= Octávio Moraes =

Brazilian footballer (1923–2009)

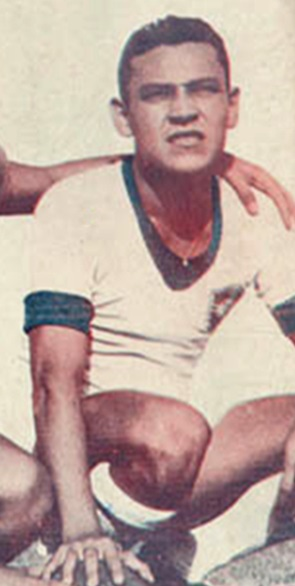
- Moraes in 1949

Personal information
- Full name: Octávio Sérgio da Costa Moraes
- Date of birth: 9 July 1923
- Place of birth: Belém, Brazil
- Date of death: 19 October 2009 (aged 86)
- Height: 1.78 m (5 ft 10 in)
- Position: Forward

Senior career*
Years	Team	Apps	(Gls)
1942–1952	Botafogo	200	(171)
1952–1953	Santos		
1953	Fluminense	3	(0)

International career
1949	Brazil	4	(1)
- * Club domestic league appearances and goals

Octávio Sérgio da Costa Moraes (9 July 1923 – 19 October 2009) was a Brazilian footballer who played as a forward. He made four appearances for the Brazil national team in 1949. He was also part of Brazil's squad for the 1949 South American Championship.
