= Dionisio Arce =

Paraguayan footballer (1927–2000)

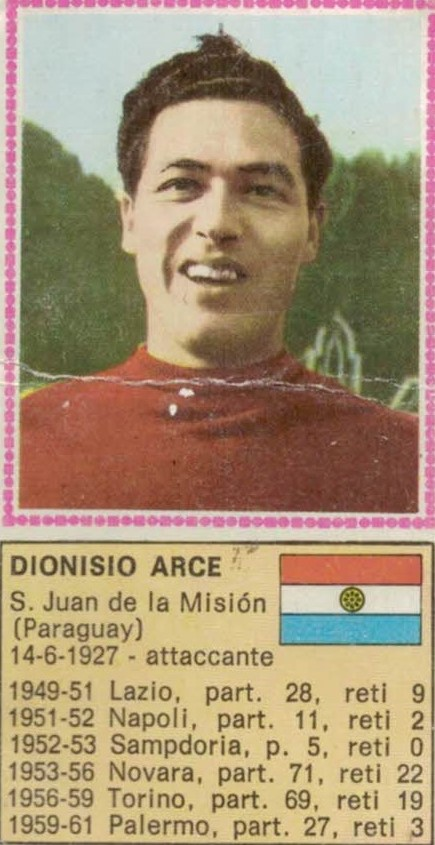

Personal information
- Date of birth: 14 June 1927
- Place of birth: San Juan Bautista, Paraguay
- Date of death: 5 November 2000 (aged 73)
- Position: Forward

Senior career*
Years	Team	Apps	(Gls)
1946–1949	Luqueño		
1949–1951	Lazio		
1951–1952	Napoli		
1952–1953	Sampdoria		
1953–1956	Novara		
1956–1959	Torino		
1959–1961	Palermo		
1961–1962	S.P.A.L.		
- * Club domestic league appearances and goals

Dionisio Arce (14 June 1927 – 5 November 2000) was a Paraguayan footballer who played as a forward. He was known for his ability to handle the ball and heading skills. He started playing for Paraguayan side Sportivo Luqueño before moving to Italy to play for several teams until the end of his career. He died in 2000, in the city of Bracciano.
