= Nininho (footballer, born 1923) =

Brazilian footballer

Personal information
- Full name: Antônio Francisco
- Date of birth: November 6, 1923
- Place of birth: Campinas, Brazil
- Date of death: October 8, 1997 (aged 73)
- Place of death: Campinas, Brazil
- Position: Striker

Senior career*
Years	Team	Apps	(Gls)
1937–1943	Campinas		
1947–1952	Portuguesa		
1953–1956	Ponte Preta		
1956–1957	Catanduva		
1957–1958	Ponte Preta		

International career
1949	Brazil	4	(3)
- * Club domestic league appearances and goals

Antônio Francisco, usually known by the nickname Nininho (November 6, 1923 – October 8, 1997), was an association footballer who played as striker. He was born in Campinas, São Paulo state.

He played football for the São Paulo state club Portuguesa, among other clubs.

== Portuguesa ==
Nininho scored 115 goals for Portuguesa, and is the club's third all-time goalscorer.

== Brazil national football team ==
Defending the Brazil national team, he played in the 1949 Copa América, and scored three goals.

Nininho had four caps, all of them in 1949 Copa América, scoring three goals.

== Honors ==
- Copa América: 1949
