= Canhotinho (footballer) =

Brazilian footballer (1924–2008)

Personal information
- Full name: Milton João de Medeiros
- Date of birth: 15 July 1924
- Place of birth: São Paulo, Brazil
- Date of death: 28 July 2008 (aged 84)
- Position: Forward

International career
Years	Team	Apps	(Gls)
1948–1949	Brazil	3	(2)

Milton João de Medeiros, known as Canhotinho, (15 July 1924 – 28 July 2008) was a Brazilian footballer. He played in three matches for the Brazil national football team from 1948 to 1949. He was also part of Brazil's squad for the 1949 South American Championship.
