= Tesourinha =

Brazilian footballer

Osmar Fortes Barcellos (3 December 1921 – 17 June 1979), commonly known as Tesourinha, was a Brazilian football striker. With Carlitos and Adãozinho, Tesourinha was one of the most renowned strikers of 1940s Brazil. He started his career for Sport Club Internacional in 1939 and scored 176 goals for the club, before leaving for Vasco da Gama in 1949 and then Grêmio in 1952.

== Clubs ==
- Internacional: 1939–1949
- Vasco da Gama: 1949–1952
- Grêmio: 1952–1955
- Nacional (RS): 1955–1957

== Honours ==
- Campeonato Gaúcho: eight times (1940, 1941, 1942, 1943, 1944, 1945, 1947 and 1948).
- Campeonato Carioca: 1950.
- Copa América: 1949, with Brazil national football team.
