= Ademir de Menezes =

Brazilian footballer (1922–1996)

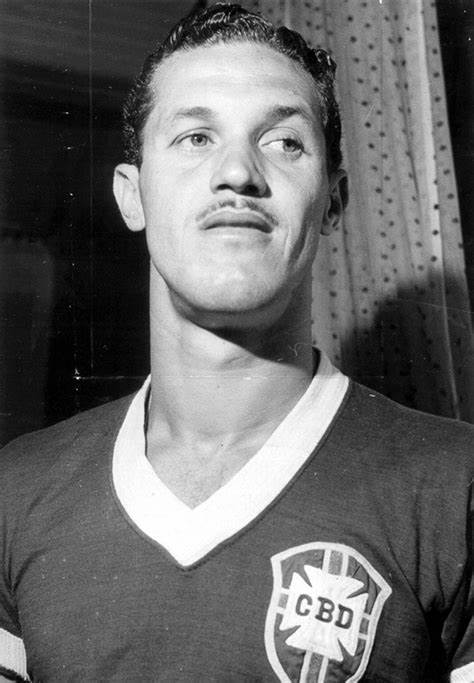
- Ademir in 1947

Personal information
- Full name: Ademir Marques de Menezes
- Date of birth: 8 November 1922
- Place of birth: Recife, Brazil
- Date of death: 11 May 1996 (aged 73)
- Place of death: Rio de Janeiro, Brazil
- Height: 1.76 m (5 ft 9 in)
- Position: Striker

Youth career
- Sport Recife

Senior career*
Years	Team	Apps	(Gls)
1939–1942	Sport Recife		
1942–1945	Vasco da Gama		(301)
1946–1947	Fluminense		
1948–1956	Vasco da Gama		
1957	Sport Recife		

International career
1945–1953	Brazil	39	(32)

Managerial career
- 1967: Vasco da Gama
Medal record
Men's Football
Representing Brazil
FIFA World Cup
Runner-up	1950 Brazil
South American Championship
Winner	1949 Brazil
Runner-up	1945 Chile
Runner-up	1946 Argentina
Runner-up	1953 Peru
Panamerican Championship
Winner	1952 Chile
- * Club domestic league appearances and goals

Ademir Marques de Menezes (Portuguese pronunciation: [adeˈmiʁ]; 8 November 1922 – 11 May 1996) was a Brazilian footballer, regarded as one of the best forwards in the country's history. He was the top goalscorer of the 1950 FIFA World Cup and scores 32 goals in 39 appearances for the Brazil national team.

== Club career ==
Ademir began his club career with Sport Recife before moving to Vasco da Gama. He played for Vasco for two spells, 1942–1945 and 1948–56, broken by a spell at Fluminense. In total, Ademir won two Pernambuco State League Championships (1941, 1942) and five Rio State League championships (1945, 1949, 1950, 1952, 1956). He won another with Fluminense (1946). He was the league's top scorer in 1949 with 30 goals and again in 1950 with 25 goals. Ademir finally retired from playing in 1956, going on to work as a commentator, coach and businessman.

== International career ==
Ademir is best known for his exploits in the 1950 World Cup held in his native Brazil. Playing in an outstanding forward trio involving Zizinho and Jair he won the Golden Boot as the top scorer in the competition with 9 goals, and he also helped the team with 6 assists in the tournament. He was the scorer of the first competitive goal at the Maracanã stadium. Despite this feat, he could not bring victory to Brazil in the decisive match against Uruguay – a national tragedy which was later dubbed the Maracanazo.

Ademir also enjoyed success in the Copa América. He played in the 1945, 1946, 1949, and 1953 editions of the tournament, with 13 goals and 3 assists in 18 appearances in the competition, including a tournament-winning hat-trick in the final play-off against Paraguay in 1949. He also won the Panamerican Championship with Brazil in 1952 scoring two goals on the title match against Chile. In total, Ademir played 39 times for his country, scoring 32 goals (according to RSSSF) between 1945 and 1953.

== Style of play ==
A fast and powerful striker, with a strong shot in both feet, Ademir began his career as a left winger before moving to the centre, causing havoc in opposing defences with his skill and sublime finishing. People at the time considered him an unequalled ball juggler who knew every trick in the book. He used to wreak havoc among defences with his quick changes in tempo, fooling his opponents with deceptions carried out almost at lightning speed, his mastering of the ball in all situations and the ability to accelerate rapidly.

== Career statistics ==
=== International ===
Brazil national team
Year	Apps	Goals
1945	9	7
1946	6	1
1947	2	0
1948	0	0
1949	5	7
1950	9	14
1951	0	0
1952	5	2
1953	3	1
Total	39	32

== International goals ==
No.	Date	Venue	Opponent	Score	Result	Competition
1.	28 January 1945	Santiago, Chile	Bolivia	1–0	2–0	1945 South American Championship
2.	15 February 1945	Santiago, Chile	Argentina	1–2	1–3	1945 South American Championship
3.	21 February 1945	Santiago, Chile	Ecuador	1–0	9–2	1945 South American Championship
4.	21 February 1945	Santiago, Chile	Ecuador	2–0	9–2	1945 South American Championship
5.	21 February 1945	Santiago, Chile	Ecuador	9–2	9–2	1945 South American Championship
6.	20 December 1945	Rio de Janeiro, Brazil	Argentina	?–?	6–2	1945 Copa Roca
7.	20 December 1945	Rio de Janeiro, Brazil	Argentina	?–?	6–2	1945 Copa Roca
8.	9 January 1946	Montevideo, Uruguay	Uruguay	1–?	1–1	1946 Copa Río Branco
9.	3 April 1949	Rio de Janeiro, Brazil	Ecuador	9–1	9–1	1949 South American Championship
10.	17 April 1949	São Paulo, Brazil	Colombia	4–0	5–0	1949 South American Championship
11.	17 April 1949	São Paulo, Brazil	Colombia	5–0	5–0	1949 South American Championship
12.	24 April 1949	Rio de Janeiro, Brazil	Peru	6–1	7–1	1949 South American Championship
13.	11 May 1949	Rio de Janeiro, Brazil	Paraguay	1–0	7–0	1949 South American Championship
14.	11 May 1949	Rio de Janeiro, Brazil	Paraguay	2–0	7–0	1949 South American Championship
15.	11 May 1949	Rio de Janeiro, Brazil	Paraguay	4–0	7–0	1949 South American Championship
16.	6 May 1950	São Paulo, Brazil	Uruguay	?–?	3–4	1950 Copa Río Branco
17.	6 May 1950	São Paulo, Brazil	Uruguay	?–?	3–4	1950 Copa Río Branco
18.	14 May 1950	Rio de Janeiro, Brazil	Uruguay	?–?	3–2	1950 Copa Río Branco
19.	18 May 1950	Rio de Janeiro, Brazil	Uruguay	1–0	1–0	1950 Copa Río Branco
20.	24 June 1950	Rio de Janeiro, Brazil	Mexico	1–0	4–0	1950 FIFA World Cup
21.	24 June 1950	Rio de Janeiro, Brazil	Mexico	4–0	4–0	1950 FIFA World Cup
22.	1 July 1950	Rio de Janeiro, Brazil	Yugoslavia	1–0	2–0	1950 FIFA World Cup
23.	9 July 1950	Rio de Janeiro, Brazil	Sweden	1–0	7–1	1950 FIFA World Cup
24.	9 July 1950	Rio de Janeiro, Brazil	Sweden	2–0	7–1	1950 FIFA World Cup
25.	9 July 1950	Rio de Janeiro, Brazil	Sweden	4–0	7–1	1950 FIFA World Cup
26.	9 July 1950	Rio de Janeiro, Brazil	Sweden	5–0	7–1	1950 FIFA World Cup
27.	13 July 1950	Rio de Janeiro, Brazil	Spain	1–0	6–1	1950 FIFA World Cup
28.	13 July 1950	Rio de Janeiro, Brazil	Spain	5–0	6–1	1950 FIFA World Cup
30.	20 April 1952	Santiago, Chile	Chile	1–0	3–0	1952 Panamerican Championship
31.	20 April 1952	Santiago, Chile	Chile	2–0	3–0	1952 Panamerican Championship
32.	12 March 1953	Lima, Peru	Ecuador	1–0	2–0	1953 South American Championship

== Honours ==
Sport Recife

- Campeonato Pernambucano: 1941, 1942

Vasco da Gama

- Campeonato Carioca: 1945, 1949, 1950, 1952
- South American Championship of Champions: 1948
- Torneio Octogonal Rivadavia Correa Meyer: 1953

Fluminense

- Campeonato Carioca: 1946

Rio de Janeiro State Team

- Campeonato Brasileiro de Seleções Estaduais: 1943, 1944

Brazil

- South American Championship: 1949
- Panamerican Championship: 1952
- FIFA World Cup runner-up: 1950
- South American Championship runner-up: 1945, 1946, 1953

Individual

- Copa América Best Player: 1949
- FIFA World Cup Golden Boot: 1950
- FIFA World Cup All-Star Team: 1950
- IFFHS Brazilian Player of the 20th Century (18th place)
- IFFHS South American Player of the 20th Century (44th place)
- Brazilian Football Museum Hall of Fame

Sporting positions
Preceded by Josef Gauchel	FIFA World Cup opening goal 1950	Succeeded by Miloš Milutinović
