= Simão (footballer, born 1928) =

Brazilian footballer (born 1924)

Pedro Simão Aquino de Araújo
Personal information
- Full name: Pedro Simão Aquino de Araújo
- Date of birth: 16 March 1924
- Place of birth: Recife, Brazil
- Place of death: São Caetano do Sul, Brazil
- Position: Forward

International career
| Years | Team | Apps | (Gls) |
| 1949 | Brazil | 7 | (5) |

Pedro Simão Aquino de Araújo (born 16 March 1924, date of death unknown) was a Brazilian footballer who played as a forward. He made seven appearances for the Brazil national team in 1949, scoring five goals. He was also part of Brazil's squad for the 1949 South American Championship.

Simão died in São Caetano do Sul.
