= Jair (footballer, born 1921) =

Brazilian footballer and manager

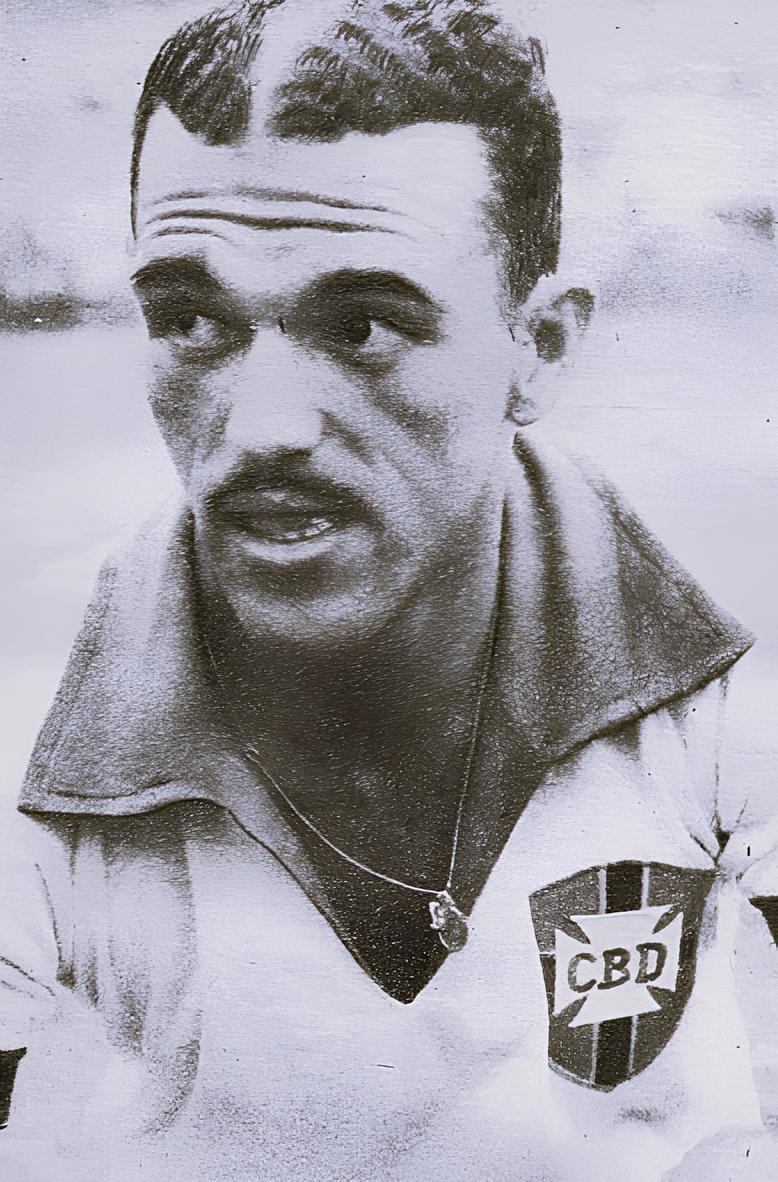
- Jair in 1949

Personal information
- Full name: Jair da Rosa Pinto
- Date of birth: 21 March 1921
- Place of birth: Quatis (RJ), Brazil
- Date of death: 28 July 2005 (aged 84)
- Place of death: Rio de Janeiro (RJ), Brazil
- Positions: Inside forward; attacking midfielder

Senior career*
Years	Team	Apps	(Gls)
1938	Barra Mansa		
1938–1943	Madureira		
1943–1947	Vasco da Gama		
1947–1949	Flamengo		
1949–1955	Palmeiras		
1956–1960	Santos		
1961	São Paulo		
1962–1963	Ponte Preta		

International career
1940–1956	Brazil	39	(22)

Managerial career
- 1963: São Paulo (subistitute)
- 1971–1972: Vitória
- 1972: Santos
- 1975–1976: Fluminense
Medal record
Men's Football
Representing Brazil
FIFA World Cup
Runner-up	1950 Brazil
South American Championship
Winner	1949 Brazil
Runner-up	1945 Chile
Runner-up	1946 Argentina
- * Club domestic league appearances and goals

Jair da Rosa Pinto (21 March 1921 – 28 July 2005), or simply Jair, was an association footballer who played offensive midfielder – one of the leading Brazilian men's footballers of the 1940s and 1950s, who is best remembered for his performance in Brazil's 1950 FIFA World Cup campaign. Usually playing as an inside-forward, Jair da Rosa was noted for his free-role style of play and was most known for his pace and technical ability.

== History ==
=== Pre-1950 ===
Born 21 March 1921, in Quatis, Rio de Janeiro, Jair started his career as a left winger at Madureira (in Rio) in 1938. He made his debut for the Brazil squad just two years later, on 5 March 1940, in a 6–1 defeat by Argentina, though Jair did score the goal – the first of 22 he was to score for Brazil.

The Brazilian team regularly featured Jair throughout the 1940s, as his club career led him first to Vasco da Gama, then to Flamengo – remaining in Rio. His greatest moment during this time, however, was in 1944, when he scored a hat-trick against Uruguay, in a friendly at São Paulo. Uruguay would come back to haunt him later, but Jair must have enjoyed playing them during the 1940s, as he scored two doubles against La Celeste Olímpica during 1946 and another in 1949 – the year Brazil won the Copa America with Jair scoring (again) two goals in the second leg of the final, a 7–0 victory against Paraguay.

=== 1950 ===
It was the following year, 1950, that Jair’s talents became appreciated on the world stage, when FIFA held their World Cup tournament in Brazil. Along with Zizinho and Ademir, Jair helped to guide Brazil's team through the tournament with great success. They played with pace and flamboyant skills, winning popularity the world over with their attacking play – scoring 22 goals in 6 World Cup games – before falling to Uruguay in a match that was, effectively, the World Cup Final – a game in which Jair hit the post during Brazil’s early domination, but was unable to stop Uruguay recovering from an early Friaca goal to triumph 2–1 and send the 200,000 fans in the Maracanã Stadium, which had been built especially for the World Cup, home disappointed.

=== Post-1950 ===
Jair was quoted later as saying "I'll take that loss to my grave", and he was certainly given time to reflect on The Defeat, cast out of the national side until January 1956 – returning for a 2-game cameo before being replaced by other, bigger names – and moving around the clubs of São Paulo – with longer, more successful spells at Palmeiras and Santos FC than the São Paulo FC and Ponte Preta clubs he represented later in his career before he retired, in 1963, at the age of 42.

When his playing career was over, Jair coached a number of teams, including Santos, Palmeiras and his first club, Madureira and is given credit for, during his playing time at Santos, helping to bring the greatest player of them all, Pelé, through into the Santos team.

Jair died of a lung infection on 21 July 2005, at the age of 84, in Rio de Janeiro. He made 39 appearances for the Brazil national football team, scoring 22 goals.

The former President of Brazil, Jair Bolsonaro, was born on his 34th birthday and is named after him.

== Honours ==
Vasco

- Rio State Championship: 1945

Palmeiras

- São Paulo State Championship: 1950
- Rio-São Paulo Tournament: 1951
- Copa Rio: 1951

Santos

- São Paulo State Championship: 1956, 1958, 1960
- Rio-São Paulo Tournament: 1959

Brazil

- Copa América: 1949
- FIFA World Cup runner-up: 1950

=== Individual ===
- Copa América Top Scorer: 1949
- FIFA World Cup All-Star Team: 1950
- Copa Rio Team of the Tournament: 1951
- Campeonato Paulista Team of the Tournament: 1951, 1953, 1954
- Torneio Rio-São Paulo Team of the Tournament: 1953, 1954
- 3rd-highest official free-kick goalscorer in football history: 74 goals
