= Zizinho =

Brazilian footballer and manager (1921–2002)

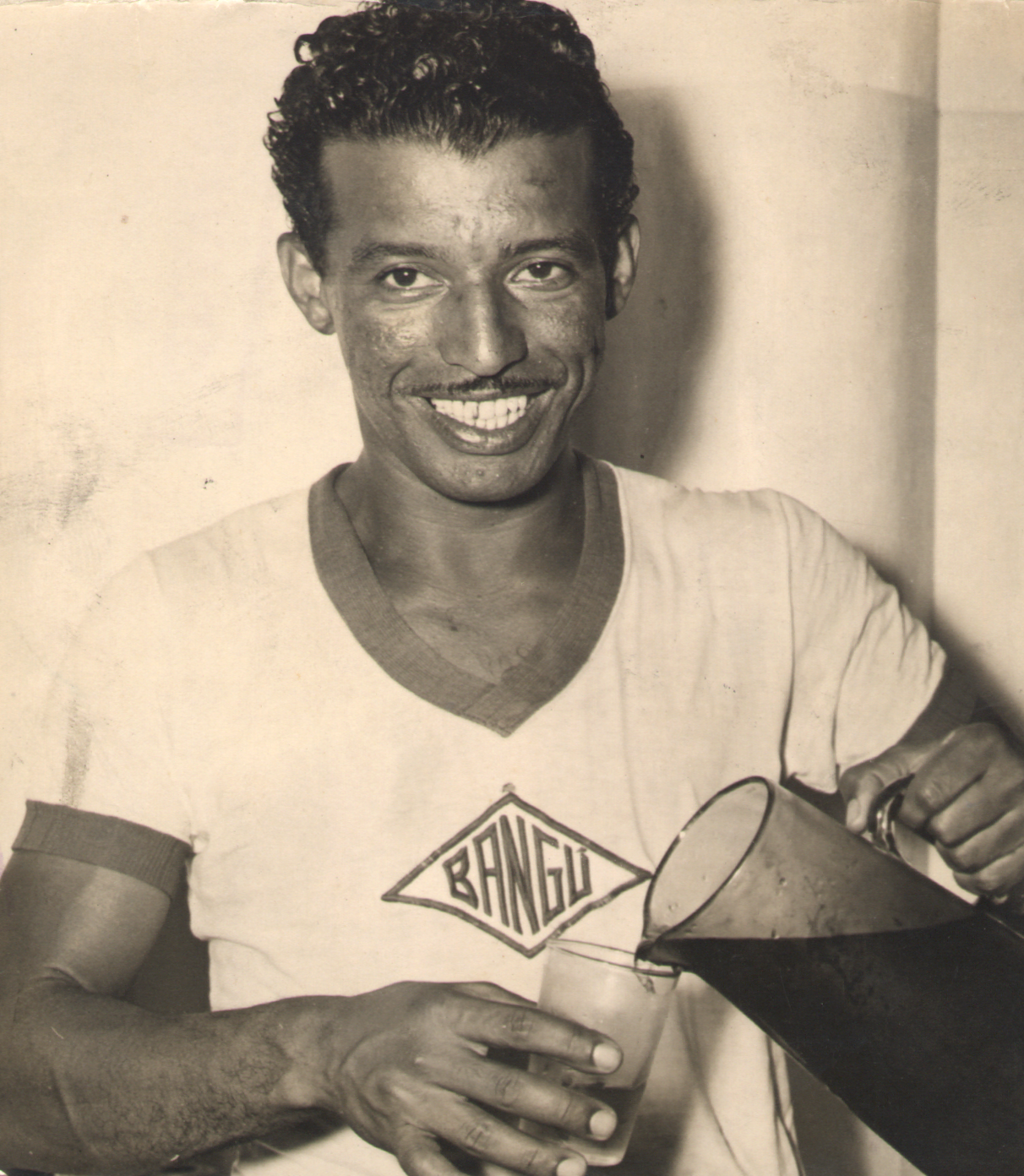
- Zizinho in 1951

Personal information
- Full name: Thomaz Soares da Silva
- Date of birth: 14 September 1921
- Place of birth: São Gonçalo, Brazil
- Date of death: 8 February 2002 (aged 80)
- Place of death: Niterói, Brazil
- Height: 1.69 m (5 ft 7 in)
- Position: Attacking midfielder

Senior career*
Years	Team	Apps	(Gls)
1939–1950	Flamengo	172	(88)
1950–1957	Bangu	147	(65)
1957–1960	São Paulo	35	(19)
1959	→ São Bento de Marília (loan)	9	(2)
1960	Uberaba	10	(1)
1961	Audax Italiano	16	(3)
Total		389	(178)

International career
1942–1957	Brazil	53	(30)

Managerial career
- 1960: Bangu
- 1965–1966: Bangu
- 1967: Vasco da Gama
- 1972: Vasco da Gama
- 1975–1976: Brazil Olympic
- 1980: Bangu
Medal record
Men's Football
Representing Brazil
FIFA World Cup
Runner-up	1950 Brazil
South American Championship
Winner	1949 Brazil
Runner-up	1945 Chile
Runner-up	1946 Argentina
Runner-up	1953 Peru
Runner-up	1957 Peru
Third place	1942 Uruguay
- * Club domestic league appearances and goals

Thomaz Soares da Silva, also known as Zizinho (Portuguese pronunciation: [ziˈzĩɲu]; 14 September 1921 – 8 February 2002), was a Brazilian footballer who played as an attacking midfielder for the Brazil national football team. He came to international prominence at the 1950 World Cup, where he scored two goals. He was lauded as a complete player, with an array of offensive skills such as his dribbling, passing, and shooting ability with both feet, as well as his accuracy from dead ball situations and extraordinary vision. He was Pelé's idol, and is often considered one of the best Brazilian men's footballers of the pre-Pelé era.

== Career ==
Born at Niterói, Rio de Janeiro, he played for Flamengo, Bangu, São Paulo FC, Audax Italiano of Chile among others teams. He is considered the first idol of Flamengo, club that he defended - winning the state championships in 1942, 1943 and 1944 - until he was transferred just before the start of 1950 World Cup to Bangu. In São Paulo he won the state championship in 1957 being extremely important and becoming an idol.

In the 1950 World Cup he helped Brazil to progress to the final, but their surprise 2–1 defeat to Uruguay tarnished his reputation. Zizinho played a total of 53 times for his national team, scoring 30 goals. He turned down last minute invitations by the CBF to join first the 1954 World Cup Squad and then the 1958 squad, citing on both occasions that it would be unfair on the player being dropped at the last minute to make way for him.

Pelé always said that Zizinho was the best player he ever saw. "He was a complete player. He played in midfield, in attack, he scored goals, he could mark, head and cross."

== Career statistics ==
=== Club ===
Club	Season	League			State League		Friendly		Torneio Rio–São Paulo		Other		Total	
Club	Season	Division	Apps	Goals	Apps	Goals	Apps	Goals	Apps	Goals	Apps	Goals	Apps	Goals
Flamengo	1940	Campeonato Carioca		0	-	9	—		-	3	—		-	5
Flamengo	1941	Campeonato Carioca		1 (Note: Goals in Torneio Municipal-RJ)	-	12	—		—		-	4 (Note: Goals in Carioca / Torneio Oscar Cox-RJ)	-	1
Flamengo	1942	Campeonato Carioca		1 (Note: Goals in Torneio Municipal-RJ)	-	11	—		—		-	1 (Note: Goals in Torneio Início do Campeonato Carioca)	-	14
Flamengo	1943	Campeonato Carioca		3 (Note: Goals in Torneio Municipal-RJ)	-	7	—		—		-	-	-	36
Flamengo	1944	Campeonato Carioca		1 (Note: Goals in Torneio Municipal-RJ)	-	8	—		—		-	1 (Note: Goals in Torneio Relâmpago-RJ)	-	29
Flamengo	1945	Campeonato Carioca		3 (Note: Goals in Torneio Municipal-RJ)	-	12	—		—		—		-	26
Flamengo	1946	Campeonato Carioca		6 (Note: Goals in Torneio Municipal-RJ)	-	0	—		—		—		-	7
Flamengo	1947	Campeonato Carioca		0	-	1	—		—		—		-	22
Flamengo	1948	Campeonato Carioca		4 (Note: Goals in Torneio Municipal-RJ)	-	16	—		—		-	-	-	19
Flamengo	1949	Campeonato Carioca		0	-	7	—		—		-	-	-	22
Flamengo	1950	Campeonato Carioca		0	-	0	—		-	1	-	-	-	22
Flamengo	Subtotal			19	172	88				4		6	318	146
Bangu	1950	Campeonato Carioca	0	0	-	9	—		-	0	-	2 (Note: Goals in Torneio Início do Rio-Sao paulo)	-	9
Bangu	1951	Campeonato Carioca	0	0	-	17	—		-	5	-	1 (Note: Goal in Torneio Início do Campeonato Carioca)	-	1
Bangu	1952	Campeonato Carioca	0	0	-	15	—		-	1	—		-	1
Bangu	1953	Campeonato Carioca	0	0	-	4	—		-	6	—		-	1
Bangu	1954	Campeonato Carioca	0	0	-	4	—		—		—		-	1
Bangu	1955	Campeonato Carioca	0	0	-	4	—		—		-	1 (Note: Goals in Torneio Início do Campeonato Carioca)	-	1
Bangu	1956	Campeonato Carioca	0	0	-	8	—		—		—		-	1
Bangu	1957	Campeonato Carioca	0	0	-	4	—		—		—		-	1
Bangu	Subtotal		-	-	147	65	-	-	-	12	-	4	283	124
São Paulo	1957	Campeonato Paulista	0	0	-	6	—		-	0	—		-	5
São Paulo	1958	Campeonato Paulista	0	0	-	13	—		-	3	—		-	1
São Paulo	Subtotal		-	-	35	19	-	-	-	3	-	-	67	27
São Bento de Marília	1959	Campeonato Paulista Série A2	0	0	9	2	0	0	—		-	-	-	2
Uberaba	1960	Campeonato Mineiro	0	0	10	1	0	0	—		-	-	-	1
Audax Italiano	1961	Chilean Primera División	16	3	—		0	0	—		-	-	-	3
Career total			16	3	373	175			-	19	-	23	-	303

=== International ===
Years	Games	Goals
1942	5	2
1943	0	0
1944	0	0
1945	9	4
1946	7	6
1947	0	0
1948	0	0
1949	7	5
1950	7	3
1951	0	0
1952	0	0
1953	5	1
1954	0	0
1955	1	2
1956	7	5
1957	6	2
Total	54	30

	Date	Venue	Score	Opponent	Goal(s)	Competition
1.	14 January 1942	Centenário, Montevidéu	6–1	Chile	0	1942 South American Championship
2.	17 January 1942	Centenário, Montevidéu	1–2	Argentina	0	1942 South American Championship
3.	21 January 1942	Centenário, Montevidéu	2–1	Peru	0	1942 South American Championship
4.	31 January 1942	Centenário, Montevidéu	5–1	Ecuador	1	1942 South American Championship
5.	5 February 1942	Centenário, Montevidéu	1–1	Paraguay	1	1942 South American Championship
6.	21 January 1945	Estadio Nacional Julio Martínez Prádanos, Santiago	3–0	Colombia	0	1945 South American Championship
7.	28 January 1945	Estadio Nacional Julio Martínez Prádanos, Santiago	2–0	Bolivia	0	1945 South American Championship
8.	7 February 1945	Estadio Nacional Julio Martínez Prádanos, Santiago	3–0	Uruguay	0	1945 South American Championship
9.	14 February 1945	Estadio Nacional Julio Martínez Prádanos, Santiago	1–3	Argentina	0	1945 South American Championship
10.	21 February 1945	Estadio Nacional Julio Martínez Prádanos, Santiago	9–2	Ecuador	2	1945 South American Championship
11.	28 February 1945	Estadio Nacional Julio Martínez Prádanos, Santiago	1–0	Chile	0	1945 South American Championship
12.	16 December 1945	Pacaembu Stadium, São Paulo	3–4	Argentina	1	Copa Roca 1945
13.	20 December 1945	Estádio São Januário, Rio de Janeiro	6–2	Argentina	1	Copa Roca 1945
14.	23 December 1945	Estádio São Januário, Rio de Janeiro	3–1	Argentina	0	Copa Roca 1945
15.	5 January 1946	Centenário, Montevidéu	3–4	Uruguay	1	Copa Rio Branco 1946
16.	9 January 1946	Centenário, Montevidéu	1–1	Uruguay	0	Copa Rio Branco 1946
17.	16 January 1946	Estadio Gasómetro, Buenos Aires	3–0	Bolivia	1	1946 South American Championship
18.	23 January 1946	Estadio Gasómetro, Buenos Aires	4–3	Uruguay	0	1946 South American Championship
19.	29 January 1946	Estadio Libertadores de América, Avellaneda	1–1	Paraguay	0	1946 South American Championship
20.	3 February 1946	Estadio Gasómetro, Buenos Aires	5–1	Chile	4	1946 South American Championship
21.	10 February 1946	Estadio Monumental (Buenos Aires), Buenos Aires	0–2	Argentina	0	1946 South American Championship
22.	3 April 1949	Estádio São Januário, Rio de Janeiro	9–1	Ecuador	1	1949 South American Championship
23.	10 April 1949	Pacaembu Stadium, São Paulo	10–1	Bolivia	2	1949 South American Championship
24.	13 April 1949	Pacaembu Stadium, São Paulo	2–1	Chile	1	1949 South American Championship
25.	24 April 1949	Estádio São Januário, Rio de Janeiro	7–1	Peru	0	1949 South American Championship
26.	30 April 1949	Estádio São Januário, Rio de Janeiro	5–1	Uruguay	1	1949 South American Championship
27.	8 May 1949	Estádio São Januário, Rio de Janeiro	1–2	Paraguay	0	1949 South American Championship
28.	11 May 1949	Estádio São Januário, Rio de Janeiro	7–0	Paraguay	0	1949 South American Championship
29.	6 May 1950	Pacaembu Stadium, São Paulo	3–4	Uruguay	1	Copa Rio Branco 1950
30.	14 May 1950	Estádio São Januário, Rio de Janeiro	3–2	Uruguay	0	Copa Rio Branco 1950
31.	17 May 1950	Estádio São Januário, Rio de Janeiro	1–0	Uruguay	0	Copa Rio Branco 1950
–	4 May 1950	Estádio São Januário, Rio de Janeiro	6–4	Combinado Grenal	1	Friendly
32.	1 July 1950	Maracanã, Rio de Janeiro	2–0	Yugoslavia	1	1950 FIFA World Cup
33.	9 July 1950	Maracanã, Rio de Janeiro	7–1	Sweden	0	1950 FIFA World Cup
34.	13 July 1950	Maracanã, Rio de Janeiro	6–1	Spain	1	1950 FIFA World Cup
35.	16 July 1950	Maracanã, Rio de Janeiro	1–2	Uruguay	0	1950 FIFA World Cup
36.	1 March 1953	National Stadium of Peru, Lima	8–1	Bolivia	0	1953 South American Championship
37.	15 March 1953	National Stadium of Peru, Lima	1–0	Uruguay	0	1953 South American Championship
38.	19 March 1953	National Stadium of Peru, Lima	0–1	Peru	0	1953 South American Championship
39.	23 March 1953	National Stadium of Peru, Lima	3–2	Chile	1	1953 South American Championship
40.	27 March 1953	National Stadium of Peru, Lima	1–2	Paraguay	0	1953 South American Championship
41.	13 November 1955	Maracanã, Rio de Janeiro	3–0	Paraguay	2	Taça Oswaldo Cruz 1955
42.	12 June 1956	Estádio do Club Libertad, Assunção	2–0	Paraguay	0	Taça Oswaldo Cruz 1956
43.	17 June 1956	Estádio do Club Libertad, Assunção	5–2	Paraguay	2	Taça Oswaldo Cruz 1956
44.	24 June 1956	Maracanã, Rio de Janeiro	2–0	Uruguay	1	Taça do Atlântico de 1956
45.	1 July 1956	Maracanã, Rio de Janeiro	2–0	Italy	0	Friendly
46.	8 July 1956	El Cilindro, Avellaneda	0–0	Argentina	0	Taça do Atlântico de 1956
47.	5 August 1956	Maracanã, Rio de Janeiro	0–1	Czechoslovakia	0	Friendly
48.	8 August 1956	Pacaembu Stadium, São Paulo	4–1	Czechoslovakia	2	Friendly
49.	13 March 1957	National Stadium of Peru, Lima	4–2	Chile	0	1957 South American Championship
50.	21 March 1957	National Stadium of Peru, Lima	7–1	Ecuador	1	1957 South American Championship
51.	24 March 1957	National Stadium of Peru, Lima	9–0	Colombia	1	1957 South American Championship
52.	28 March 1957	National Stadium of Peru, Lima	2–3	Uruguay	0	1957 South American Championship
53.	31 March 1957	National Stadium of Peru, Lima	1–0	Peru	0	1957 South American Championship
54.	3 April 1957	National Stadium of Peru, Lima	0–3	Argentina	0	1957 South American Championship

== Honours ==
=== Club ===
Flamengo

- Campeonato Carioca: 1942, 1943, 1944

São paulo

- Campeonato Paulista: 1957

=== International ===
- FIFA World Cup runner-up: 1950
- South American Championship: 1949
- Taça do Atlântico: 1956
- Roca Cup: 1945
- Copa Rio Branco: 1950
- Taça Oswaldo Cruz: 1955, 1956

=== Individual ===
- FIFA World Cup Golden Ball: 1950
- FIFA World Cup All-Star Team: 1950
- Torneio Rio-São Paulo Team of the Tournament: 1952, 1953
- IFFHS Brazilian Player of the 20th Century (4th place)
- IFFHS South American Player of the 20th Century (10th place)
- Brazilian Football Museum Hall of Fame

=== Records ===
- South American Championship / Copa América all-time top goalscorer: 17 goals (shared with Norberto Méndez)

=== Manager ===
Brazil Olympic

- Pan American Games: 1975
