= 1952 Copa Rio =

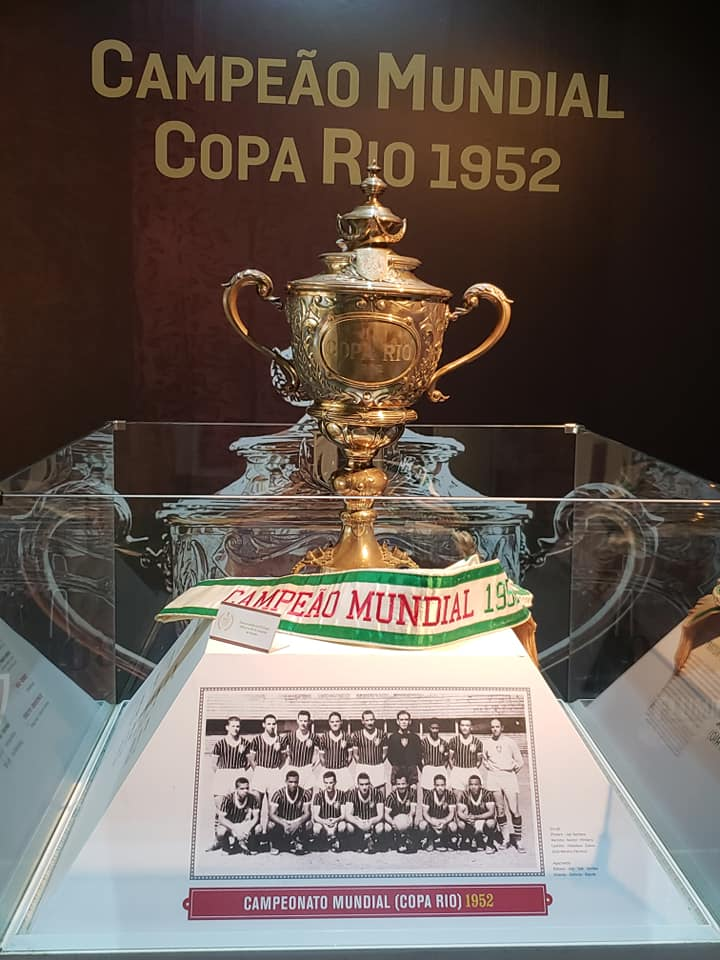
- The cup won by Fluminense (team displayed below) exhibited at the club's hall of trophies

Tournament details
- Host country: Brazil
- Dates: 12 July – 2 August
- Teams: 8 (from 7 associations)
- Venues: 2 (in 2 host cities)

Final positions
- Champions: (Brazil) Fluminense
- Runners-up: (Brazil) Corinthians

Tournament statistics
- Matches played: 18

The 1952 Copa Rio was the second and last edition of the Copa Rio, the first intercontinental club football tournament with teams from Europe and South America, held in Rio de Janeiro and São Paulo from 12 July to 2 August. The competition was organized by CBD and Fluminense, and it carries this name because it was sponsored by the Rio de Janeiro City Hall. Participant clubs were divided into two zones of four teams, playing each other once in a single round-robin tournament.

== History ==
The second edition of the Copa Rio was supposed to be contested in 1953, according to the stipulated plan when the competition was created in 1951, indicating it would be a biennial event. However, it was advanced to 1952 at the request of Fluminense, which wanted to organize the event as part of the celebrations for its fiftieth anniversary. The club took on the organization of the tournament with authorization and support from the CBD and financial support from the Municipal Chamber of Rio de Janeiro.

The tournament featured players such as Obdulio Varela, Roque Máspoli, Alcides Ghiggia, Juan Alberto Schiaffino of Peñarol, José Travassos of Sporting Lisbon, Didi, Joao Pinheiro of Fluminense, Luizinho, goalkeeper Gilmar of Corinthians and Roger Vonlanthen of Grasshopper.

Peñarol withdrew from the competition in the semifinals after the first leg against Corinthians Paulista. Dissatisfied with the refereeing in the tumultuous and violent match against Corinthians Paulista (in which even the German referee and a newspaper photographer were assaulted, the latter hospitalized with a leg fracture, according to O Estado de S. Paulo on July 25, 1952), and claiming that their bus was stoned by an 'excited crowd' of Corinthians supporters 'the powerless police couldn't contain' after the game, the Uruguayans requested the rescheduling of the return match to Rio de Janeiro (originally scheduled for Pacaembu Stadium in São Paulo) as a condition to stay in the competition. Corinthians did not agree to the change in the location of the game, leading the Uruguayans to abandon the competition.

The final was played in a two-legged format, contested by Brazilian teams Fluminense and Corinthians Paulista. Fluminense won the series 2–1 on points, achieving their first Copa Rio trophy.

Fluminense considers the Copa Rio its greatest title ever won by the club and is striving for the competition to be recognized as the FIFA Club World Cup. In 2021, the club submitted a dossier to FIFA through CONMEBOL, requesting the official recognition of the title. On that occasion, the document had the support of the CBF and then-president Rogério Caboclo.

== Participants ==
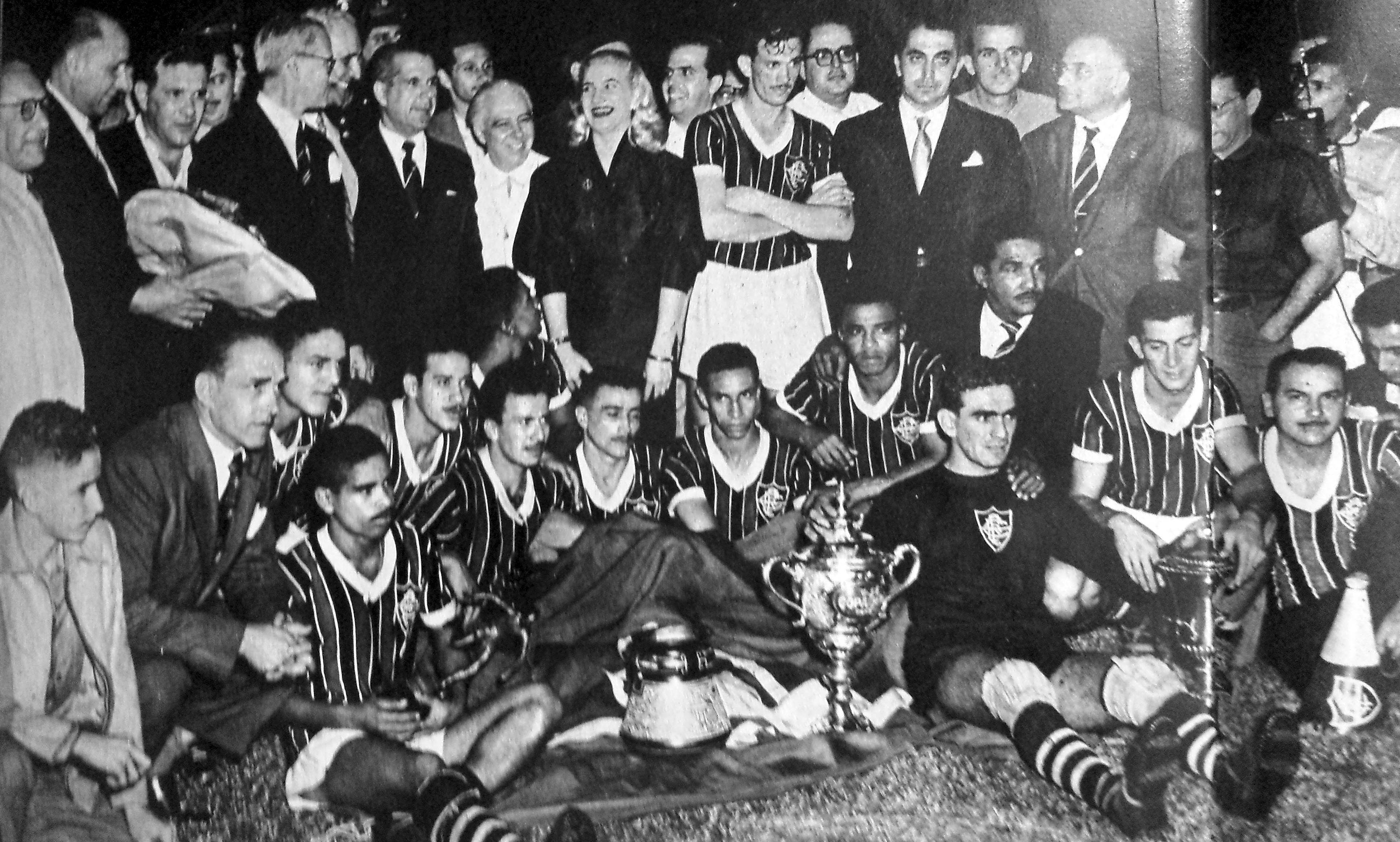
Fluminense, champions

Team	Qualification
Austria Wien	1951–52 Austrian League 2nd.
(Brazil) Corinthians	1952 Campeonato Paulista champion
(Brazil) Fluminense	1951 Campeonato Carioca champion
(West Germany) Saarbrücken	1951–52 Oberliga 2nd.
(Paraguay) Libertad	1952 Primera División 3rd.
(Portugal) Sporting CP	1951–52 Primeira Divisão champion
(Switzerland) Grasshoppers	1951–52 Nationalliga A champion
(Uruguay) Peñarol	1951 Primera División champion

Notes

- Italian team Juventus (1951–52 Serie A champion) and Argentine club Racing (1951 Primera División champion) withdrew from the competition.

== Venues ==
Rio de Janeiro	São Paulo
Maracanã Stadium	Pacaembu Stadium
Capacity: 150,000	Capacity: 71,000

== Tournament course ==
=== Rio de Janeiro Group ===
All matches played at Estádio do Maracanã.

Teams	GP	W	D	L	GF	GA	GD	Points
(Brazil) Fluminense	3	2	1	0	4	0	4	5
(Uruguay) Peñarol	3	2	0	1	4	4	0	4
(Portugal) Sporting CP	3	1	1	1	3	4	-1	3
(Switzerland) Grasshoppers	3	0	0	3	1	4	-3	0

12 July 1952

Peñarol (Uruguay)	1–0	(Switzerland) Grasshoppers
Hohberg 61'	Report

Maracanã, Rio de Janeiro
Referee: Arnold Gabler (Austria)

13 July 1952

Fluminense (Brazil)	0–0	(Portugal) Sporting
	Report

Maracanã, Rio de Janeiro
Attendance: 73,915
Referee: Eugen Dinger (West Germany)

16 July 1952

Peñarol (Uruguay)	3–1	(Portugal) Sporting
Romay 55'; Míguez 77'; Schiaffino 84'	Report	João Martins 60'

Maracanã, Rio de Janeiro
Referee: Eugen Dinger (West Germany)

17 July 1952

Fluminense (Brazil)	1–0	(Switzerland) Grasshoppers
Marinho 79'	Report

Maracanã, Rio de Janeiro
Attendance: 19,703
Referee: Arnold Gabler (Austria)

19 July 1952

Sporting (Portugal)	2–1	(Switzerland) Grasshoppers
José Travassos 37'; Jesus Correia 47'	Report	Ballaman 66'

Maracanã, Rio de Janeiro
Referee: Arnold Gabler (Austria)

20 July 1952

Fluminense (Brazil)	3–0	(Uruguay) Peñarol
Marinho 36', 75'; Orlando 44'	Report

Maracanã, Rio de Janeiro
Attendance: 63,536
Referee: Eugen Dinger (West Germany)

=== São Paulo Group ===
All matches played at Estádio do Pacaembu.

Teams	GP	W	D	L	GF	GA	GD	Points
(Brazil) Corinthians	3	3	0	0	14	2	12	6
Austria Wien	3	2	0	1	10	5	5	4
(Paraguay) Libertad	3	1	0	2	6	11	-4	2
(West Germany) Saarbrücken	3	0	0	3	3	15	-12	0

12 July 1952

Austria Wien	4–2	(Paraguay) Libertad
Pichler 19'; E. Melchior 27'; Huber 30'; Stojaspal 55'	Report	Fernández 32'; Gómez 89' (pen.)

Pacaembu, São Paulo
Referee: Alberto da Gama Malcher (Brazil)

13 July 1952

Corinthians (Brazil)	6–1	(West Germany) Saarbrücken
Cláudio 1'; Baltazar 27', 51', 73', 82', 83'	Report	Martin 61'

Pacaembu, São Paulo
Referee: Fritz Buchmuller (Switzerland)

16 July 1952

Austria Wien	5–1	(West Germany) Saarbrücken
Aurednik 2', 81'; Stojaspal 12'; Kominek 44'; E. Melchior 52'	Report	Momber 81' (pen.)

Pacaembu, São Paulo
Referee: Alberto da Gama Malcher (Brazil)

17 July 1952

Corinthians (Brazil)	6–0	(Paraguay) Libertad
Baltazar 20', 88'; Carbone 24', 90'; Cláudio 32'; Luizinho 70'	Report

Pacaembu, São Paulo
Referee: Fritz Buchmuller (Switzerland)

19 July 1952

Libertad (Paraguay)	4–1	(West Germany) Saarbrücken
Hermosilla 49'; Heredia 30'; Arrúa 74'; Fernández 81'	Report	Momber 77' (pen.)

Pacaembu, São Paulo
Referee: Joaquim Campos (Portugal)

20 July 1952

Corinthians (Brazil)	2–1	Austria Wien
Carbone 49'; Gatão 86'	Report	Kominek 34'

Pacaembu, São Paulo
Referee: Juan Carlos Armental (Uruguay)

=== Semi-finals ===
==== First leg ====
23 July 1952

Fluminense (Brazil)	1–0	Austria Wien
Didi 75'	Report

Maracanã, Rio de Janeiro
Attendance: 34,180
Referee: Gabriel Tordjmann (France)

24 July 1952

Corinthians (Brazil)	2–1	(Uruguay) Peñarol
Cláudio 65', 70' (pen.)	Report	Ghiggia 57'

Pacaembu, São Paulo
Referee: Eugen Dinger (West Germany)

==== Second leg ====
27 July 1952

Fluminense (Brazil)	5–2	Austria Wien
Telê 6'; Orlando 31', 41', 65'; Quincas 53'	Report	Stojaspal 15'; Pichler 20'

Maracanã, Rio de Janeiro
Attendance: 45,623
Referee: Gabriel Tordjmann (France)

27 July 1952

Corinthians (Brazil)	w/o	(Uruguay) Peñarol

Pacaembu, São Paulo

=== Finals ===
Champion	Runner-up	1 leg	Venue	2 leg	Venue	Aggr.
(Brazil) Fluminense	(Brazil) Corinthians	2–0	Maracanã	2–2	Maracanã	4–2

==== Match details ====
1952 Copa Rio Finals
30 July 1952
First leg

Fluminense (Brazil)	2–0	(Brazil) Corinthians
Orlando 22'; Marinho 70'	Report

Maracanã Stadium, Rio de Janeiro
Attendance: 38,680
Referee: Joaquim Campos (Portugal)

2 August 1952
Second leg

Fluminense (Brazil)	2–2	(Brazil) Corinthians
Didi 10'; Marinho 64'	Report	Jackson 56'; Souzinha 89'

Maracanã Stadium, Rio de Janeiro
Attendance: 65,946
Referee: Gabriel Tordjaman (France)

Fluminense
Corinthians

GK	(Brazil) Castilho
RB	(Brazil) Píndaro
LB	(Brazil) Pinheiro	(substituted off) a'
RH	(Brazil) Jair Santana
CH	(Brazil) Edson
LH	(Brazil) Bigode
OR	(Brazil) Telê	(substituted off) b'
IR	(Brazil) Didi
CF	(Brazil) Marinho
IL	(Brazil) Orlando Pingo de Ouro
OL	(Brazil) Quincas
Substitutes:
	(Brazil) Nestor	(substituted on) a'
	(Brazil) Robson	(substituted on) b'
Manager:
(Brazil) Zezé Moreira

GK	(Brazil) Gilmar
DF	(Brazil) Homero
DF	(Brazil) Olavo
DF	(Brazil) Goiano
MF	(Brazil) Idário	(substituted off) a'
MF	(Brazil) Julião
OR	(Brazil) Cláudio
IR	(Brazil) Luizinho	(substituted off) b'
CF	(Brazil) Colombo
IL	(Brazil) Carbone
OL	(Brazil) Jackson
Substitutes:
	(Brazil) Sula	(substituted on) a'
	(Brazil) Souzinha	(substituted on) b'
Manager:
(Brazil) Rato

Fluminense won the series 2–1 on points

1952 Copa Rio
(Brazil)
Fluminense
First title
