= List of Fluminense FC players =

This is a list of some of the main football players who played for Fluminense (Bold denotes current players).

- (Brazil) Abel Braga
- (Brazil) Ademir de Menezes
- (Brazil) Aldo
- (Brazil) Altair
- (Brazil) André currently playing for (United Kingdom) Wolverhampton
- (Brazil) Assis (defender)
- (Brazil) Assis (midfielder)
- (Brazil) Batatais
- (Brazil) Branco
- (Brazil) Bigode
- (Brazil) Búfalo Gil
- (Brazil) Carlinhos
- (Brazil) Carlos Alberto
- (Brazil) Carlos Alberto Pintinho
- (Brazil) Carlos Alberto Torres
- (Brazil) Carlos Castilho
- (Brazil) Cícero
- (Brazil) Cláudio Adão
- (Argentina) Darío Conca
- (Portugal) Deco
- (Serbia) Dejan Petković
- (Brazil) Delei
- (Brazil) Denílson
- (Brazil) Didi
- (Brazil) Diego Cavalieri
- (Brazil) Diguinho
- (Brazil) Dirceu
- (Brazil) Edinho
- (Colombia) Edwin Valencia
- (Brazil) Escurinho
- (Brazil) Ézio
- (Brazil) **Fábio**
- (Colombia) Faustino Asprilla
- (Brazil) Felipe
- (Brazil) Felipe Melo
- (Brazil) Félix
- (Brazil) Fernando Guidicelli
- (Brazil) Flávio
- (Brazil) Fred
- (Argentina) **Germán Cano**
- (Brazil) Gérson
- (Brazil) Gum
- (England) Henry Welfare
- (Brazil) Hércules
- (Brazil) Jair
- (Brazil) Jean
- (Colombia) **Jhon Arias**
- (Brazil) Leandro Euzébio
- (Brazil) Lula
- (Brazil) Magno Alves
- (Brazil) Manfrini
- (Brazil) Marcão
- (Brazil) Marcelo
- (Brazil) Marco Antônio
- (Brazil) Marcos Carneiro de Mendonça
- (Brazil) Mariano currently playing for (Brazil) Atlético Mineiro
- (Brazil) Marinho Chagas
- (Brazil) Mickey
- (Argentina) Narciso Doval
- (Brazil) Nino currently playing for (Russia) Zenit Saint Petersburg
- (Brazil) Orlando Pingo de Ouro
- (England) Oscar Cox
- (Brazil) Paulo Cézar Caju
- (Brazil) **Paulo Henrique Ganso**
- (Brazil) Paulo Vítor
- (Brazil) Píndaro
- (Brazil) Pinheiro
- (Brazil) Preguinho
- (Brazil) Rafael Sóbis
- (Brazil) Renato Gaúcho
- (Brazil) Ricardo Berna
- (Brazil) Ricardo Gomes
- (Brazil) Ricardo Pinto
- (Brazil) Roberto Rivellino
- (Brazil) Roger Flores
- (Brazil) Roger Machado
- (Brazil) Ronaldinho
- (Brazil) Romário
- (Paraguay) Romerito
- (Brazil) Rôni
- (Brazil) Rubens Galaxe
- (Argentina) Russo
- (Brazil) Samarone
- (Brazil) **Samuel Xavier**
- (Brazil) Telê Santana
- (Brazil) Tim
- (Brazil) Thiago Neves
- (Brazil) **Thiago Silva**
- (Brazil) Tuta
- (Brazil) Wágner
- (Brazil) Waldo
- (Brazil) Washington
- (Brazil) Washington "Braveheart"
- (Brazil) Wellington Nem currently playing for (Brazil) Vitória
