= Didi (footballer, born 1928) =

Brazilian footballer (1928–2001)

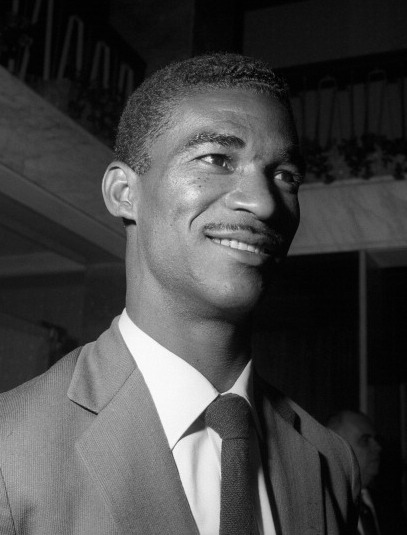
- Didi in 1958

Personal information
- Full name: Waldyr Pereira
- Date of birth: 8 October 1928
- Place of birth: Campos dos Goytacazes, RJ, Brazil
- Date of death: 12 May 2001 (aged 72)
- Place of death: Rio de Janeiro, RJ, Brazil
- Height: 1.72 m (5 ft 8 in)
- Positions: Midfielder; inside forward

Youth career
- 1944: São Cristóvão
- 1945: Industrial
- 1945: Rio Branco
- 1945–1946: Goytacaz
- 1946: Americano

Senior career*
Years	Team	Apps	(Gls)
1947–1949	Madureira	32	(8)
1949–1956	Fluminense	150	(51)
1956–1959	Botafogo	64	(40)
1959–1960	Real Madrid	19	(6)
1960–1962	Botafogo	44	(19)
1962–1964	Cristal	32	(4)
1964–1965	Botafogo	11	(1)
1965–1966	Veracruz	29	(4)
1966	São Paulo	4	(0)

International career
1952–1962	Brazil	68	(20)

Managerial career
- 1962–1964: Cristal
- 1967–1969: Cristal
- 1969–1970: Peru
- 1970–1971: River Plate
- 1972–1975: Fenerbahçe
- 1975: Fluminense
- 1977: Cruzeiro
- 1977–1981: Al-Ahli
- 1981: Botafogo
- 1981: Cruzeiro
- 1982–1983: Al-Shabab
- 1985: Fortaleza
- 1986: São Paulo
- 1986: Alianza Lima
- 1989–1990: Bangu
Medal record
Men's Football
Representing Brazil
FIFA World Cup
Winner	1958 Sweden
Winner	1962 Chile
Copa América
Runner-up	1953 Peru
Runner-up	1957 Peru
Runner-up	1959 Argentina
Panamerican Championship
Winner	1952 Chile
- * Club domestic league appearances and goals

Waldyr Pereira (8 October 1928 – 12 May 2001), also known as Didi (Brazilian Portuguese: [dʒiˈdʒi]), was a Brazilian footballer who played as a midfielder or as a forward. He played in three FIFA World Cups (1954, 1958, and 1962), winning the latter two.

An elegant and technical player, Didi was renowned for his range of passing, stamina and technique. He also was a free-kick specialist, being famous for inventing the folha seca (dry leaf) dead ball free kicks, notably used by modern-day players such as Juninho and Cristiano Ronaldo, where the ball would swerve downward unexpectedly at a point resulting in a goal.

During his career, he was part of Fluminense between the end of the 1940s to the mid-1950s and one of the main players of the iconic squad of Botafogo in the early 1960s with other world champions such as Garrincha, Nilton Santos, Zagallo and Amarildo.

== Early life ==
Didi was born into a poor family in the city of Campos dos Goytacazes, 150 miles north of Rio de Janeiro. As a youngster, he sold peanuts in order to help his family, and began playing football in the streets and nearly had his right leg amputated when he was 14 due to a severe infection following an injury to his knee. He later recovered and played for local clubs in his hometown.

== Playing career ==
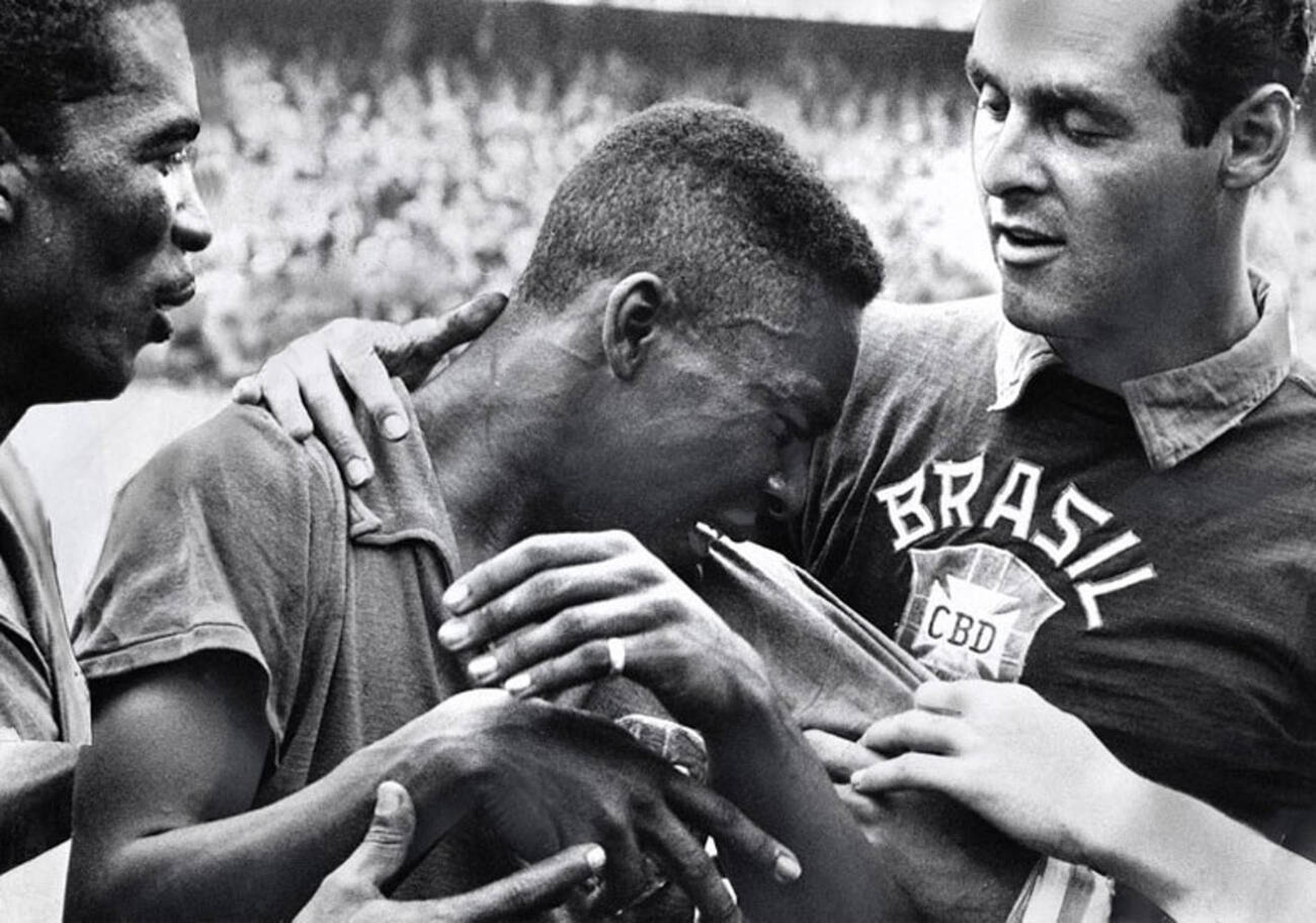
Celebration after final whistle in 1958 FIFA World Cup Final. From the left, Didi, Pelé and Gilmar.

He became professional playing for Madureira and came to prominence when he joined Fluminense in 1949. At Fluminense, Didi played between 1949 and 1956, the club for which he played the longest time without interruption, having played 298 matches and scored 91 goals, being one of the main responsible for winning the 1951 Carioca Championship, in addition to scoring the first goal in the history of Maracanã for the Carioca Selection in 1950, defending his childhood club, and leading the Brazil National team in winning the 1952 Panamerican Championship, disputed in Chile, in the first relevant achievement of the Brazil national team abroad, having played alongside Djalma Santos, Castilho, Waldo, Telê Santana, Orlando Pingo de Ouro, Altair and Pinheiro, among others. During seven seasons with the club he won the Campeonato carioca in 1951 and 1952 Copa Rio. On 16 June 1950, in a friendly match involving Rio de Janeiro and São Paulo youth state teams, Didi (aged 21), playing for Rio de Janeiro, scored the first ever goal at the Maracanã Stadium.

During the 1954 World Cup he scored goals against Mexico and Yugoslavia, before Brazil's defeat to the favorites Hungary. This match was known as the Battle of Berne; Didi was involved with the brawl that followed this bad-tempered match.

At club level, he moved to Botafogo, winning the Campeonato Carioca (Rio state championship) in 1957. Didi had previously promised to walk from the Maracanã to his house, in the neighbourhood of Laranjeiras (9,4 km), in his kit, if Botafogo won the championship; 5,000 Botafogo fans joined him as he did so.

His greatest achievement came at the 1958 FIFA World Cup where he was player of the tournament. From midfield, he masterminded the first of his two FIFA World Cup successes for Brazil. In 68 international matches he scored 20 goals, including a dozen using his trademark free-kicks.

In 1959, he was signed by Real Madrid of Spain, playing alongside many historical players such as Ferenc Puskás, Alfredo Di Stefano and Francisco Gento.

Despite his great reputation after the 1958 FIFA World Cup, he played only 19 matches with six goals for the Spaniards and often clashed with the team leader Alfredo Di Stéfano, who felt offended by the divide in the fans' attention with this newcomer; this situation precipitated his exit from the club. Nevertheless, despite his brief stint as a player for Real Madrid, he was able to participate in the victorious campaign of 1959–60 European Cup, becoming the first ever player to win both the FIFA World Cup and the European Cup.

After Real Madrid he came back to Botafogo in the early 60s with the well-known players Garrincha, Nilton Santos, Zagallo, Amarildo, Quarentinha and players such as Manga, Gérson, Rildo and Jairzinho. At the time, Botafogo was the only club in national level able to compete against the Santos of Pelé.

After almost three successful years with Botafogo, he signed with Sporting Cristal from Peru in 1963, and returning once again for Botafogo for the last time in 1964. Botafogo was the club for which Didi played the most matches: he played 313 games and scored 114 goals. He was Rio champion for the club in 1957, 1961 and 1962 and also won the 1962 Rio-São Paulo Tournament, the same year he won the Pentagonal of Mexico and, in 1963, the Paris Tournament.

In 1965 he moved to the Mexican league to play for C.D. Veracruz. In 1966, at the age of 38, he signed with São Paulo expecting to lead the team with his experience, but he played only four games. After that, he decided to become a coach and retired as a player.

== Managerial career ==
After retiring as player, he began a coach career with Sporting Cristal, and was called to manage the Peru national team in the 1970 FIFA World Cup, successfully guided the Peruvians qualifying at the expense of Argentina, repaying the debt for eliminating Peru from 1958 FIFA World Cup. That team included stars like Teófilo Cubillas and Héctor Chumpitaz were eventually defeated in the quarter-finals by Brazil. In 1971, he managed the top Argentine club, River Plate, when he accepted a lucrative position, and had his apex in his coaching career with Turkish Giant Fenerbahçe, guiding the team to two consecutive Turkish First Division (later named Süper Lig) titles in 1973–1974 and later in 1974–1975.

He also coached important Brazilian clubs like Bangu, Fluminense, Botafogo, Cruzeiro, Peruvian club Alianza Lima, the Kuwaiti national team and Al-Ahli.

== Later years ==
He would marry two times throughout his life. His son Bibi who also played as a professional footballer would come from his first marriage to his first wife, Maria Luíza do Espírito Santo.

In October 2000, he was inducted into the FIFA Hall of Champions. By this time he was quite ill and died the following year in Rio de Janeiro, at the age of 72, after contracting pneumonia from complications arising from intestinal cancer.

== Career statistics ==
=== International ===
Appearances and goals by national team and year
National team	Year	Apps	Goals
Brazil	1952	5	1
Brazil	1953	5	0
Brazil	1954	7	2
Brazil	1955	2	0
Brazil	1956	10	2
Brazil	1957	10	9
Brazil	1958	8	1
Brazil	1959	7	3
Brazil	1961	4	1
Brazil	1962	10	1
Total		68	20

Scores and results list Brazil's goal tally first, score column indicates score after each Didi goal.

List of international goals scored by Didi
No.	Date	Venue	Opponent	Score	Result	Competition	Ref.
1	16 April 1952	Estadio Nacional, Santiago, Chile	Uruguay	1–0	4–2	1952 Panamerican Championship	
2	16 June 1954	Charmilles Stadium, Geneva, Switzerland	Mexico	2–0	5–0	1954 FIFA World Cup	
3	19 June 1954	Stade Olympique de la Pontaise, Lausanne, Switzerland	Yugoslavia	1–1	1–1	1954 FIFA World Cup	
4	15 April 1956	Praterstadion, Vienna, Austria	Austria	–	3–2	Friendly	
5	9 May 1956	Wembley Stadium, London, England	England	2–2	2–4	Friendly	
6	13 April 1957	Estadio Nacional del Perú, Lima, Peru	Chile	1–1	4–2	1957 South American Championship	
7	13 April 1957	Estadio Nacional del Perú, Lima, Peru	Chile	2–1	4–2	1957 South American Championship	
8	13 April 1957	Estadio Nacional del Perú, Lima, Peru	Chile	3–1	4–2	1957 South American Championship	
9	23 March 1957	Estadio Nacional del Perú, Lima, Peru	Colombia	5–0	9–0	1957 South American Championship	
10	23 March 1957	Estadio Nacional del Perú, Lima, Peru	Colombia	6–0	9–0	1957 South American Championship	
11	28 March 1957	Estadio Nacional del Perú, Lima, Peru	Uruguay	2–3	2–3	1957 South American Championship	
12	31 March 1957	Estadio Nacional del Perú, Lima, Peru	Peru	1–0	1–0	1957 South American Championship	
13	21 April 1957	Estádio Municipal, Rio de Janeiro, Brazil	Peru	1–0	1–0	1958 FIFA World Cup qualification	
14	11 June 1957	Estádio Municipal, Rio de Janeiro, Brazil	Portugal	–	2–1	Friendly	
15	24 June 1958	Råsunda Stadium, Stockholm, Sweden	France	2–1	5–2	1958 FIFA World Cup	
16	10 March 1959	Estadio Monumental, Buenos Aires, Argentina	Peru	1–0	2–2	1959 South American Championship	
17	15 March 1959	Estadio Monumental, Buenos Aires, Argentina	Chile	3–0	3–0	1959 South American Championship	
18	21 March 1959	Estadio Monumental, Buenos Aires, Argentina	Bolivia	4–2	4–2	1959 South American Championship	
19	7 May 1961	Estadio Nacional, Santiago, Chile	Chile	–	2–1	1961 Copa Bernardo O'Higgins	
20	21 April 1962	Estádio Municipal, Rio de Janeiro, Brazil	Paraguay	–	6–0	1962 Taça Oswaldo Cruz	

== Honours ==
=== Player ===
Botafogo

- Campeonato Carioca: 1957, 1961, 1962
- Torneio Rio–São Paulo: 1962
- Tournament Home: 1961, 1962, 1963
- Colombia International Tournament: 1960
- Pentagonal Club of Mexico: 1962

Fluminense

- Copa Rio: 1952
- Campeonato Carioca: 1951

Real Madrid

- European Cup: 1959–60
- Ramon de Carranza Trophy: 1959

Brazil

- FIFA World Cup: 1958, 1962
- Copa Oswaldo Cruz: 1955, 1958, 1961, 1962
- O'Higgins Cup: 1955, 1961
- Panamerican Championship: 1952
- Taça do Atlântico: 1956

=== Manager ===
Fenerbahçe

- 1. Lig: 1973–74, 1974–75
- Turkish Cup: 1973–74
- Presidential Cup: 1973, 1975
- Prime Minister's Cup: 1973

=== Individual ===
- FIFA World Cup Golden Ball: 1958
- FIFA World Cup All-Star Team: 1958
- IFFHS Brazilian Player of the 20th Century (7th place)
- IFFHS World Player of the 20th Century (19th place)
- The Best of The Best – Player of the Century: Top 50
- Brazilian Football Museum Hall of Fame
- Ballon d'Or Dream Team (Bronze): 2020
- IFFHS South America Men's Team of All Time: 2021
