= Torneio Octogonal Rivadavia Correa Meyer =

- Organiser(s): (Brazil) CBD
- Founded: 1953
- Abolished: 1953; 73 years ago
- Region: Europe; South America
- Teams: 8
- Related competitions: Copa Rio
- Last champions: (Brazil) Vasco da Gama (1953)
- Most championships: (Brazil) Vasco da Gama (1 title)

The Torneio Octogonal Rivadavia Correa Meyer was an intercontinental club football tournament held in Brazil in 1953. It was organised by the Brazilian Sports Confederation (Confederação Brasileira de Desportos) as a successor of Copa Rio, that featured teams from Europe and South America. Torneo Octogonal had a similar format than its predecessor, being also held in Rio de Janeiro and São Paulo from June 7 to July 4. Participant clubs were divided into two zones of four teams, playing each other once in a single round-robin tournament.

The final was played in a two-legged format, contested by Brazilian teams Vasco da Gama and São Paulo. After beating São Paulo twice, Vasco won the series 4–0 on points, achieving their first Torneo Octogonal trophy.

The tournament was named after Rivadávia Corrêa Meyer, football executive and president of the "Confederação Brasileira de Desportos" (Brazilian Sports Confederation), a position he occupied from 1943 to 1955.

== Participants ==
Team
(Brazil) Botafogo
(Brazil) Fluminense (Note: Entered the berth left open by the prohibition by the AUF for the participation of Nacional. After the said withdrawal, both Fluminense and Flamengo demanded the berth, and the CBD gave it to Fluminense, due to its position in the Torneio Rio-São Paulo.)
(Brazil) Vasco da Gama
(Brazil) Corinthians
(Brazil) São Paulo
(Paraguay) Olimpia
(Scotland) Hibernian (Note: Invited as 1951–52 Division A champion.)
(Portugal) Sporting CP (Note: Invited as 1952–53 Primeira Divisão champion.)

Notes

- Spanish club Real Madrid (champion of the 1952 Small Club World Cup) withdrew from the competition.

== Venues ==
Rio de Janeiro	São Paulo
Maracanã Stadium	Pacaembu Stadium
Capacity: 150,000	Capacity: 71,000

== Group stage ==
=== Rio de Janeiro Group ===
Teams	GP	W	D	L	GF	GA	GD	Points
(Brazil) Vasco da Gama	3	2	1	0	7	5	2	5
(Brazil) Fluminense	3	1	1	1	6	4	2	3
(Brazil) Botafogo	3	1	1	1	6	5	1	3
(Scotland) Hibernian	3	0	1	2	4	9	-5	1

Jun 7

Vasco da Gama (Brazil)	3–3	(Scotland) Hibernian
Maneca 12'; Alvinho 78', 83'	Report	Turnbull 26'; Reilly 66', 90'

Maracanã Stadium, Rio de Janeiro

Jun 13

Botafogo (Brazil)	3–1	(Scotland) Hibernian
Zezinho 23', 81' da Costa 61'	Report	Reilly 66'

Maracanã Stadium, Rio de Janeiro

Jun 14

Vasco da Gama (Brazil)	2–1	(Brazil) Fluminense
Sabará 31'; Pinga 59'	Report	Simões 62'

Maracanã Stadium, Rio de Janeiro

Jun 17

Botafogo (Brazil)	2–2	(Brazil) Fluminense
da Costa 9'; Vinicius 23'	Report	Didi 77'; Robson 87'

Maracanã Stadium, Rio de Janeiro

Jun 20

Fluminense (Brazil)	3–0	(Scotland) Hibernian
Quincas 42'; Telê 50', 56'	Report

Maracanã Stadium, Rio de Janeiro

Jun 21

Botafogo (Brazil)	1–2	(Brazil) Vasco da Gama
Vinicius 59'	Report	Maneca 56'; Pinga 74'

Maracanã Stadium, Rio de Janeiro

=== São Paulo Group ===
Teams	GP	W	D	L	GF	GA	GD	Points
(Brazil) São Paulo	3	2	1	0	9	3	6	5
(Brazil) Corinthians	3	2	1	0	8	4	4	5
(Portugal) Sporting CP	3	0	1	2	3	7	-4	1
(Paraguay) Olimpia	3	0	1	2	4	10	-6	1

Jun 7

Corinthians (Brazil)	5–2	(Paraguay) Olimpia
Carbone 14', 50'; Goiano 38'; Cláudio 77'; Luizinho 78'	Report	Arámbulo 7'; Ávalos 21'

Pacaembu Stadium, São Paulo

Jun 13

São Paulo (Brazil)	4–1	(Paraguay) Olimpia
Maurinho 13'; Lanzoninho 20' (pen.); Negri 85'; Benedito 89'	Report	Ávalos 40'

Pacaembu Stadium, São Paulo

Jun 14

Corinthians (Brazil)	2–1	(Portugal) Sporting CP
Luizinho 31'; Baltazar 60'	Report	Vasques 55'

Pacaembu Stadium, São Paulo

Jun 17

São Paulo (Brazil)	4–1	(Portugal) Sporting CP
Gino 12'; Teixeirinha 22'; Lanzoninho 54'; Pé de Valsa 89'	Report	Mendonça 87'

Pacaembu Stadium, São Paulo

Jun 20

Sporting CP (Portugal)	1–1	(Paraguay) Olimpia
Hernâni 24'	Report	Ávalos 38'

Pacaembu Stadium, São Paulo

Jun 21

São Paulo (Brazil)	1–1	(Brazil) Corinthians
Benedito 86'	Report	Souzinha 89'

Pacaembu Stadium, São Paulo

== Play-off ==
=== Semi-finals ===
Team 1	Agg.	Team 2	1st leg	2nd leg
São Paulo (Brazil)	2–1	(Brazil) Fluminense	1–0	1–1
Vasco da Gama (Brazil)	7–3	(Brazil) Corinthians	4–2	3–1

Jun 24

São Paulo (Brazil)	1–0	(Brazil) Fluminense
Píndaro 55' (o.g.)	Report

Pacaembu Stadium, São Paulo
Jun 28

São Paulo (Brazil)	1–1 (a.e.t.)	(Brazil) Fluminense
Teixeirinha 116'	Report	Telê 45'

Pacaembu Stadium, São Paulo

São Paulo won 2-1 on aggregate.

Jun 24

Vasco da Gama (Brazil)	4–2	(Brazil) Corinthians
Pinga 1', 16'; Maneca 30'; Ipojucan 72'	Report	Baltazar 3'; Vermelho 82'

Maracanã Stadium, Rio de Janeiro
Jun 28

Vasco da Gama (Brazil)	3–1	(Brazil) Corinthians
Maneca 10'; Sabará 30'; Dejair 75'	Report	Carbone 27'

Maracanã Stadium, Rio de Janeiro

Vasco da Gama won 7-3 on aggregate.

=== Finals ===
Champion	Runner-up	1 leg	Venue	2 leg	Venue	Aggr.
(Brazil) Vasco da Gama	(Brazil) São Paulo	1–0	Pacaembu	2–1	Maracanã	3–1

==== Match details ====
1953 Torneio Octogonal Final
July 1, 1953
First leg

São Paulo (Brazil)	0–1	(Brazil) Vasco da Gama
	Report	Dejair 77'

Pacaembu Stadium, São Paulo

July 4, 1953
Second leg

Vasco da Gama (Brazil)	2–1	(Brazil) São Paulo
Pinga 2', 43'	Report	Pé de Valsa 70'

Maracanã Stadium, Rio de Janeiro

Vasco da Gama	São Paulo

== Champions ==
Vasco da Gama won 3-1 on aggregate.

1953 Torneio Octogonal
(Brazil)
Vasco da Gama
First title

== Top Goalscorer ==
Pinga scored the most goals with 4 goals.

== See also ==
- Copa Rio (international tournament)
