= 1953 São Paulo FC season =

São Paulo
1953 season
- Chairman: Cícero Pompeu de Toledo
- Manager: Vicente Feola; Jim López
- Torneio Rio-São Paulo: 3rd
- Campeonato Paulista: Champions

The 1953 football season was São Paulo's 24th season since club's existence.

== Overall ==
| Games played | 54 (9 Torneio Rio-São Paulo, 28 Campeonato Paulista, 17 Friendly match) |
| Games won | 34 (4 Torneio Rio-São Paulo, 24 Campeonato Paulista, 6 Friendly match) |
| Games drawn | 10 (3 Torneio Rio-São Paulo, 2 Campeonato Paulista, 5 Friendly match) |
| Games lost | 10 (2 Torneio Rio-São Paulo, 2 Campeonato Paulista, 6 Friendly match) |
| Goals scored | 108 |
| Goals conceded | 52 |
| Goal difference | +56 |
| Best result | 6–1 (H) v Comercial - Campeonato Paulista - 1953.07.19 |
| Worst result | 0–4 (A) v Palmeiras - Friendly match - 1953.03.15 |
| Most appearances | |
| Top scorer | |

Source: São Paulo FC

== Friendlies ==
| February 8 International | São Paulo (Brazil) | 0–2 | (Argentina) Racing | São Paulo |
| | | | Goal | Stadium: Estádio Paulo Machado de Carvalho (Pacaembu) |

| March 12 Taça Tibiriçá | Corinthians | 3–2 | São Paulo | São Paulo |
| | Goal | | Goal | Stadium: Estádio Paulo Machado de Carvalho (Pacaembu) |

| March 15 Taça Tibiriçá | Palmeiras | 4–0 | São Paulo | São Paulo |
| | Goal | | | Stadium: Estádio Paulo Machado de Carvalho (Pacaembu) |

| March 25 National | Atlético Mineiro | 0–3 | São Paulo | Belo Horizonte |
| | | | Goal | Stadium: Estádio Raimundo Sampaio (Independência) |

| March 29 National | Atlético Mineiro | 0–1 | São Paulo | Belo Horizonte |
| | | | Goal | Stadium: Estádio Raimundo Sampaio (Independência) |

| April 5 National | Guarani | 1–1 | São Paulo | Campinas |
| | Goal | | Goal | Stadium: Fortim do Bugre |

| June 14 Rivadavia Correa Meyer | São Paulo (Brazil) | 4–1 | (Paraguay) Olimpia | São Paulo |
| | Goal | | Goal | Stadium: Estádio Paulo Machado de Carvalho (Pacaembu) |

| June 17 Rivadavia Correa Meyer | São Paulo (Brazil) | 4–1 | (Portugal) Sporting | São Paulo |
| | Goal | | Goal | Stadium: Estádio Paulo Machado de Carvalho (Pacaembu) |

| June 21 Rivadavia Correa Meyer | São Paulo (Brazil) | 1–1 | (Brazil) Corinthians | São Paulo |
| | Goal | | Goal | Stadium: Estádio Paulo Machado de Carvalho (Pacaembu) |

| June 24 Rivadavia Correa Meyer | São Paulo (Brazil) | 1–0 | (Brazil) Fluminense | São Paulo |
| | Goal | | | Stadium: Estádio Paulo Machado de Carvalho (Pacaembu) |

| June 28 Rivadavia Correa Meyer | São Paulo (Brazil) | 1–1 | (Brazil) Fluminense | São Paulo |
| | Goal | | Goal | Stadium: Estádio Paulo Machado de Carvalho (Pacaembu) |

| July 1 Rivadavia Correa Meyer | São Paulo (Brazil) | 0–1 | (Brazil) Vasco da Gama | São Paulo |
| | | | Goal | Stadium: Estádio Paulo Machado de Carvalho (Pacaembu) |

| July 4 Rivadavia Correa Meyer | Vasco da Gama (Brazil) | 2–1 | (Brazil) São Paulo | Rio de Janeiro |
| | Goal | | Goal | Stadium: Estádio Municipal do Rio de Janeiro (Maracanã) |

| July 10 National | Santos | 0–0 | São Paulo | Santos |
| | | | | Stadium: Estádio Urbano Caldeira (Vila Belmiro) |

| August 25 National | Ferroviária | 2–2 | São Paulo | Araraquara |
| | Goal | | Goal | Stadium: Estádio Doutor Adhemar de Barros (Fonte Luminosa) |

| October 21 Taça Cidade de São Paulo | Portuguesa | 0–4 | São Paulo | São Paulo |
| | | | Goal | Stadium: Estádio Paulo Machado de Carvalho (Pacaembu) |

| October 21 Taça Cidade de São Paulo | Corinthians | 3–1 | São Paulo | São Paulo |
| | Goal | | Goal | Stadium: Estádio Paulo Machado de Carvalho (Pacaembu) |

== Official competitions ==
=== Torneio Rio-São Paulo ===
| April 11 1 | São Paulo | 1–1 | Palmeiras | São Paulo |
| | Goal | | Goal | Stadium: Estádio Paulo Machado de Carvalho (Pacaembu) |

| April 19 2 | São Paulo | 3–1 | Corinthians | São Paulo |
| | Goal | | Goal | Stadium: Estádio Paulo Machado de Carvalho (Pacaembu) |

| April 25 3 | São Paulo | 3–1 | Botafogo | São Paulo |
| | Goal | | Goal | Stadium: Estádio Paulo Machado de Carvalho (Pacaembu) |

| May 1 4 | Vasco da Gama | 1–0 | São Paulo | Rio de Janeiro |
| | Goal | | | Stadium: Estádio Municipal do Rio de Janeiro (Maracanã) |

| May 10 5 | São Paulo | 2–1 | Fluminense | São Paulo |
| | Goal | | Goal | Stadium: Estádio Paulo Machado de Carvalho (Pacaembu) |

| May 17 6 | São Paulo | 2–0 | Santos | São Paulo |
| | Goal | | | Stadium: Estádio Paulo Machado de Carvalho (Pacaembu) |

| May 23 7 | Bangu | 3–1 | São Paulo | Rio de Janeiro |
| | Goal | | Goal | Stadium: Estádio Municipal do Rio de Janeiro (Maracanã) |

| May 31 8 | São Paulo | 0–0 | Flamengo | São Paulo |
| | | | | Stadium: Estádio Paulo Machado de Carvalho (Pacaembu) |

| June 4 9 | Portuguesa | 1–0 | São Paulo | São Paulo |
| | Goal | | | Stadium: Estádio Paulo Machado de Carvalho (Pacaembu) |

==== Record ====
| Final Position | Points | Matches | Wins | Draws | Losses | Goals For | Goals Away | Win% |
|---|---|---|---|---|---|---|---|---|
| 3rd | 10 | 9 | 4 | 2 | 3 | 12 | 9 | 52% |

=== Campeonato Paulista ===
| July 19 1 | São Paulo | 6–1 | Comercial | São Paulo |
| | Goal | | Goal | Stadium: Estádio Paulo Machado de Carvalho (Pacaembu) |

| July 26 2 | XV de Jaú | 0–3 | São Paulo | Jaú |
| | | | Goal | Stadium: Estádio Artur Simões |

| August 2 3 | São Paulo | 1–1 | XV de Piracicaba | São Paulo |
| | Goal | | Goal | Stadium: Estádio Paulo Machado de Carvalho (Pacaembu) |

| August 9 4 | Nacional | 1–4 | São Paulo | São Paulo |
| | Goal | | Goal | Stadium: Estádio Nicolau Alayon (Comendador Sousa) |

| August 16 5 | São Paulo | 1–0 | Juventus | São Paulo |
| | Goal | | | Stadium: Estádio Paulo Machado de Carvalho (Pacaembu) |

| August 22 6 | São Paulo | 1–0 | Ponte Preta | São Paulo |
| | Goal | | | Stadium: Estádio Paulo Machado de Carvalho (Pacaembu) |

| August 30 7 | Guarani | 0–3 | São Paulo | Campinas |
| | | | Goal | Stadium: Estádio Brinco de Ouro da Princesa |

| September 5 8 | São Paulo | 4–1 | Ypiranga | São Paulo |
| | Goal | | Goal | Stadium: Estádio Palestra Itália (Parque Antarctica) |

| September 13 9 | São Paulo | 3–1 | Palmeiras | São Paulo |
| | Goal | | Goal | Stadium: Estádio Paulo Machado de Carvalho (Pacaembu) |

| September 19 10 | São Paulo | 4–2 | Linense | São Paulo |
| | Goal | | Goal | Stadium: Estádio Paulo Machado de Carvalho (Pacaembu) |

| September 27 11 | São Paulo | 2–0 | Portuguesa | São Paulo |
| | Goal | | | Stadium: Estádio Paulo Machado de Carvalho (Pacaembu) |

| October 4 12 | São Paulo | 1–0 | Corinthians | São Paulo |
| | Goal | | | Stadium: Estádio Paulo Machado de Carvalho (Pacaembu) |

| October 11 13 | Portuguesa Santista | 0–2 | São Paulo | Santos |
| | | | Goal | Stadium: Estádio Ulrico Mursa |

| October 17 14 | Santos | 1–4 | São Paulo | São Paulo |
| | Goal | | Goal | Stadium: Estádio Paulo Machado de Carvalho (Pacaembu) |

| November 1 15 | São Paulo | 2–0 | Comercial | São Paulo |
| | Goal | | | Stadium: Estádio Paulo Machado de Carvalho (Pacaembu) |

| November 8 16 | XV de Piracicaba | 2–4 | São Paulo | Piracicaba |
| | Goal | | Goal | Stadium: Campo da Rua Regente Feijó |

| November 15 17 | São Paulo | 3–0 | Portuguesa Santista | São Paulo |
| | Goal | | | Stadium: Estádio Paulo Machado de Carvalho (Pacaembu) |

| November 29 18 | Ponte Preta | 0–0 | São Paulo | Campinas |
| | | | | Stadium: Estádio Moisés Lucarelli |

| December 6 19 | Ypiranga | 0–1 | São Paulo | São Paulo |
| | | | Goal | Stadium: Estádio Paulo Machado de Carvalho (Pacaembu) |

| December 13 20 | Linense | 4–1 | São Paulo | Lins |
| | Goal | | Goal | Stadium: Estádio Gigante da Madeira |

| December 19 21 | São Paulo | 4–0 | Nacional | São Paulo |
| | Goal | | | Stadium: Estádio Paulo Machado de Carvalho (Pacaembu) |

| December 23 22 | São Paulo | 3–1 | XV de Jaú | São Paulo |
| | Goal | | Goal | Stadium: Estádio Paulo Machado de Carvalho (Pacaembu) |

| January 3, 1954 23 | Portuguesa | 1–0 | São Paulo | São Paulo |
| | Goal | | | Stadium: Estádio Paulo Machado de Carvalho (Pacaembu) |

| January 9, 1954 24 | Juventus | 0–2 | São Paulo | São Paulo |
| | | | Goal | Stadium: Estádio Paulo Machado de Carvalho (Pacaembu) |

| January 16, 1954 25 | São Paulo | 3–2 | Guarani | São Paulo |
| | Goal | | Goal | Stadium: Estádio Paulo Machado de Carvalho (Pacaembu) |

| January 24, 1954 26 | Santos | 1–3 | São Paulo | Santos |
| | Goal | | Goal | Stadium: Estádio Urbano Caldeira (Vila Belmiro) |

| January 31, 1954 27 | São Paulo | 3–1 | Corinthians | São Paulo |
| | Goal | | Goal | Stadium: Estádio Paulo Machado de Carvalho (Pacaembu) |

| February 7, 1954 28 | São Paulo | 2–1 | Palmeiras | São Paulo |
| | Goal | | Goal | Stadium: Estádio Paulo Machado de Carvalho (Pacaembu) |

==== Record ====
| Final Position | Points | Matches | Wins | Draws | Losses | Goals For | Goals Away | Win% |
|---|---|---|---|---|---|---|---|---|
| 1st | 50 | 28 | 24 | 2 | 2 | 70 | 21 | 89% |
