= Jair Santana =

Brazilian footballer

Personal information
- Full name: Jair Florêncio de Santana
- Date of birth: 20 February 1929
- Place of birth: Rio de Janeiro, Brazil
- Date of death: 13 October 2014 (aged 85)
- Place of death: Rio de Janeiro, Brazil
- Position: Midfielder

Senior career*
Years	Team	Apps	(Gls)
1951	Olaria		
1952–1961	Fluminense	329	(9)

Managerial career
- 1964: Olaria
- * Club domestic league appearances and goals as of 12 May 2024

Jair Florêncio de Santana (20 February 1929 – 13 October 2014), mostly known as Jair Santana, was a Brazilian professional footballer who played as a midfielder.

== Career ==
One of the players with the most appearances in Fluminense's history, with 329 matches, Jair Santana was part of the state champion squads in 1959, the Rio-São Paulo Tournament in 1957 and 1960, and the Copa Rio in 1952.

== Honours ==
Fluminense

- Campeonato Carioca: 1959
- Torneio Rio-São Paulo: 1957, 1960
- Copa Rio: 1952

== Death ==
Jair Santana died as a result of a urinary infection, on 13 October 2014.
