= Pé de Valsa =

Brazilian footballer (1924–1977)

Personal information
- Full name: Antônio Machado de Oliveira
- Date of birth: 1 December 1924
- Place of birth: Rio de Janeiro, Brazil
- Date of death: 15 April 1977 (aged 52)
- Place of death: Rio de Janeiro, Brazil
- Position: Midfielder

Youth career
- –1942: Bonsucesso

Senior career*
Years	Team	Apps	(Gls)
1943–1944	Bonsucesso		
1945–1951	Fluminense	212	(7)
1951–1956	São Paulo	236	(10)
1956–1958	Paulista		
- * Club domestic league appearances and goals as of 16 September 2023

Antônio Machado de Oliveira (1 December 1924 – 15 April 1977), also known by the nickname Pé de Valsa, was a Brazilian professional footballer who played as a midfielder.

== Career ==
Antônio started his career at Bonsucesso and due to his good football he was soon signed by Fluminense. He was called "Pé de Valsa" (English: "Waltz Foot") due to the size of his legs and his ease in holding the ball while attacked by opponents.

== Honours ==
=== Fluminense ===
- Campeonato Carioca: 1946, 1951
- Taça da Prefeitura do Distrito Federal: 1948

=== São Paulo ===
- Campeonato Paulista: 1953
- Small Club World Cup: 1955
