= 1953 Small Club World Cup (2nd tournament) =

1953 Copa Rio 1953
Tournament details
- Host country: Venezuela
- Dates: July 11 – August 2
- Teams: 4 (from 2 associations)
- Venue: 1 (in 1 host city)

Final positions
- Champions: (Brazil) Corinthians (1st title)

Tournament statistics
- Matches played: 12
- Goals scored: 40 (3.33 per match)
- Top scorer(s): (Hungary) László Kubala (Brazil) Luizinho (5 goals each)

The 1953 Small Club World Cup (2nd tournament) was the third edition of the Small Club World Cup, a tournament held in Venezuela between 1952 and 1957, in certain years between 1963 and 1970, and in 1975. It was played by four participants, half from Europe and half from South America in double round robin format and featured stars like László Kubala, goalkeeper Antoni Ramallets, Estanislau Basora for Barcelona, goalkeeper Gilmar, Baltazar for Corinthians, Egisto Pandolfini and Carlo Galli for Roma. This was the 2nd tournament played in the same year; none was held in the next calendar year.

Corinthians entered to the competition (as champion of 1952 Campeonato Paulista), after Vasco da Gama (1952 Campeonato Carioca champion) declined the invitation. FC Barcelona striker László Kubala was the topscorer of the competition, along with Brazilian midfielder Luizinho, with 5 goals each.

== Participants ==
Team	Qualification
(Brazil) Corinthians	1952 Campeonato Paulista champion
(Spain) Barcelona	1952–53 La Liga champion
(Italy) Roma	1952–53 Serie A, 6th.
(Venezuela) Selección Caracas (Note: Not the Caracas F.C. but a combined team.)	Host team

== Matches ==
11 July

Selección Caracas (Venezuela)	1–2	(Italy) Roma
Mosquera 35'	Report	Pandolfini 70'; Galli 89'

Estadio Olímpico, Caracas

14 July

Selección Caracas (Venezuela)	3–2	(Spain) Barcelona
Mosquera 22'; Silva 36'; Miroc 44'	Report	Kubala 10', 86'

Estadio Olímpico, Caracas
Referee: Luigi Gemini (Italy)

16 July

Corinthians (Brazil)	1–0	(Italy) Roma
Luizinho 21'	Report

Estadio Olímpico, Caracas
Referee: Benito Jackson (Venezuela)

18 July

Corinthians (Brazil)	3–2	(Spain) Barcelona
Luizinho 49', 77'; Goiano 61'	Report	Moreno 2'; Kubala 88'

Estadio Olímpico, Caracas
Referee: Luigi Gemini (Italy)

21 July

Selección Caracas (Venezuela)	1–2	(Brazil) Corinthians
Aguirre 64'	Report	Cláudio 33'; Carbone 62'

Estadio Olímpico, Caracas
Referee: Luigi Gemini (Italy)

23 July

Barcelona (Spain)	1–0	(Italy) Roma
Moreno 42'	Report

Estadio Olímpico, Caracas
Referee: Baumberger (Switzerland)

25 July

Selección Caracas (Venezuela)	2–2	(Italy) Roma
Mosquera 47'; Paulo 81'	Report	Galli 1'; Renosto 8'

Estadio Olímpico, Caracas

27 July

Corinthians (Brazil)	1–0	(Spain) Barcelona
Goiano 61'	Report

Estadio Olímpico, Caracas
Referee: Benito Jackson (Venezuela)

29 July

Barcelona (Spain)	2–4	(Italy) Roma
Aloy 20'; Basora 40'	Report	Perissinotto 52', 80'; Pandolfini 60', 65'

Estadio Olímpico, Caracas
Referee: Baumberger (Switzerland)

31 July

Selección Caracas (Venezuela)	0–2	(Brazil) Corinthians
	Report	Cláudio 13', 84'

Estadio Olímpico, Caracas
Referee: Luigi Gemini (Italy)

1 August

Selección Caracas (Venezuela)	2–3	(Spain) Barcelona
Padrón 13'; Berni 21'	Report	Moreno 11'; Kubala 15', 75'

Estadio Olímpico, Caracas

2 August

Corinthians (Brazil)	3–1	(Italy) Roma
Cláudio 30'; Luizinho 55', 88'	Report	Galli 32'

Estadio Olímpico, Caracas
Referee: Braumberger (Switzerland)

== Final standings ==
Team	Pts	P	W	D	L	GF	GA	GD
(Brazil) Corinthians	12	6	6	0	0	12	4	8
(Italy) Roma	5	6	2	1	3	9	10	-1
(Spain) Barcelona	4	6	2	0	4	10	13	-3
(Venezuela) Selección Caracas	3	6	1	1	4	9	13	-4

== Topscorers ==
Rank	Player	Team	Goals
1	(Hungary) László Kubala	(Spain) Barcelona	5
1	(Brazil) Luizinho	(Brazil) Corinthians	5
2	(Peru) Máximo Mosquera	(Venezuela) Selección Caracas	3
2	(Italy) Carlo Galli	(Italy) Roma	3
2	(Spain) Moreno	(Spain) Barcelona	3

== Winners ==
1953 Small Club World Cup (2nd.)
(Second Brazilian Republic)
Corinthians
1st. title
