= 1953 Campeonato Paulista =

Campeonato Paulista
- Season: 1953
- Champions: São Paulo
- Relegated: Nacional; Portuguesa Santista
- Matches: 210
- Goals: 771 (3.67 per match)
- Top goalscorer: Humberto Tozzi (Palmeiras) – 22 goals
- Biggest home win: São Paulo 6-1 Comercial (July 19, 1953); Nacional 6-1 Linense (October 11, 1953); Palmeiras 6-1 Juventus (December 27, 1953); Palmeiras 7-2 Linense (January 30, 1954)
- Biggest away win: Juventus 1-7 Ponte Preta (August 8, 1953)
- Highest scoring: Santos 6-3 XV de Jaú (August 2, 1953); Corinthians 6-3 Ypiranga (December 27, 1953); Palmeiras 6-3 Santos (January 3 1954); Palmeiras 7-2 Linense (January 30, 1954)

The 1953 Campeonato Paulista da Primeira Divisão, organized by the Federação Paulista de Futebol, was the 52nd season of São Paulo's top professional football league. São Paulo won the title for the 7th time. Nacional and Portuguesa Santista were relegated. Palmeiras's Humberto Tozzi was the highest scorer with 22 goals.

== Championship ==
The championship was disputed in a double-round robin system, with the team with the most points winning the title and the two teams with the fewest points being relegated.

Pos	Team	Pld	W	D	L	GF	GA	GD	Pts	Qualification or relegation
1	São Paulo	28	24	2	2	70	21	+49	50	Champions
2	Palmeiras	28	19	5	4	85	45	+40	43	
3	Corinthians	28	15	8	5	60	45	+15	38	
4	Portuguesa	28	13	7	8	60	45	+15	33	
5	Guarani	28	12	7	9	39	34	+5	31	
6	Ponte Preta	28	10	8	10	42	36	+6	28	
7	Santos	28	12	3	13	60	52	+8	27 (Note: Head-to-head record: XV de Piracicaba 1-1 Santos, Santos 3-1 XV de Piracicaba)	
8	XV de Piracicaba	28	10	7	11	58	55	+3	27	
9	Comercial	28	10	6	12	45	44	+1	26	
10	Linense	28	10	5	13	51	61	−10	25	
11	XV de Jaú	28	10	5	13	52	64	−12	24 (Note: XV de Jaú lost the points of a tie against Juventus)	
12	Juventus	28	6	7	15	34	66	−32	19 (Note: Head-to-head record: Juventus 6 pts, Ypiranga 4 pts, Portuguesa Santista 2 pts)	
13	Ypiranga	28	6	7	15	39	64	−25	19	
14	Portuguesa Santista	28	6	7	15	34	53	−19	19	Relegated
15	Nacional	28	3	4	21	42	86	−44	10	Relegated

Updated to match(es) played on February 7, 1954. Source: RSSSF.com
Rules for classification: 1) points; 2) head-to-head points; 3) goal difference; 4) wins.

== Top Scores ==
Rank	Player	Club	Goals
1	Humberto Tozzi	Palmeiras	22
2	Maurinho	São Paulo	18
2	Gino	São Paulo	18
4	Cláudio	Corinthians	17
5	Gustavo Albella	São Paulo	16
6	Moreno	XV de Piracicaba	15
6	Nininho	Ponte Preta	15
6	Rodrigues	Palmeiras	15
6	Vasconcelos	Santos	15
10	Américo Murolo	Linense	14
10	Átis	Portuguesa	14
10	Silas	XV de Jaú	14
