= Carlos Castilho =

Brazilian footballer and manager (1927–1987)

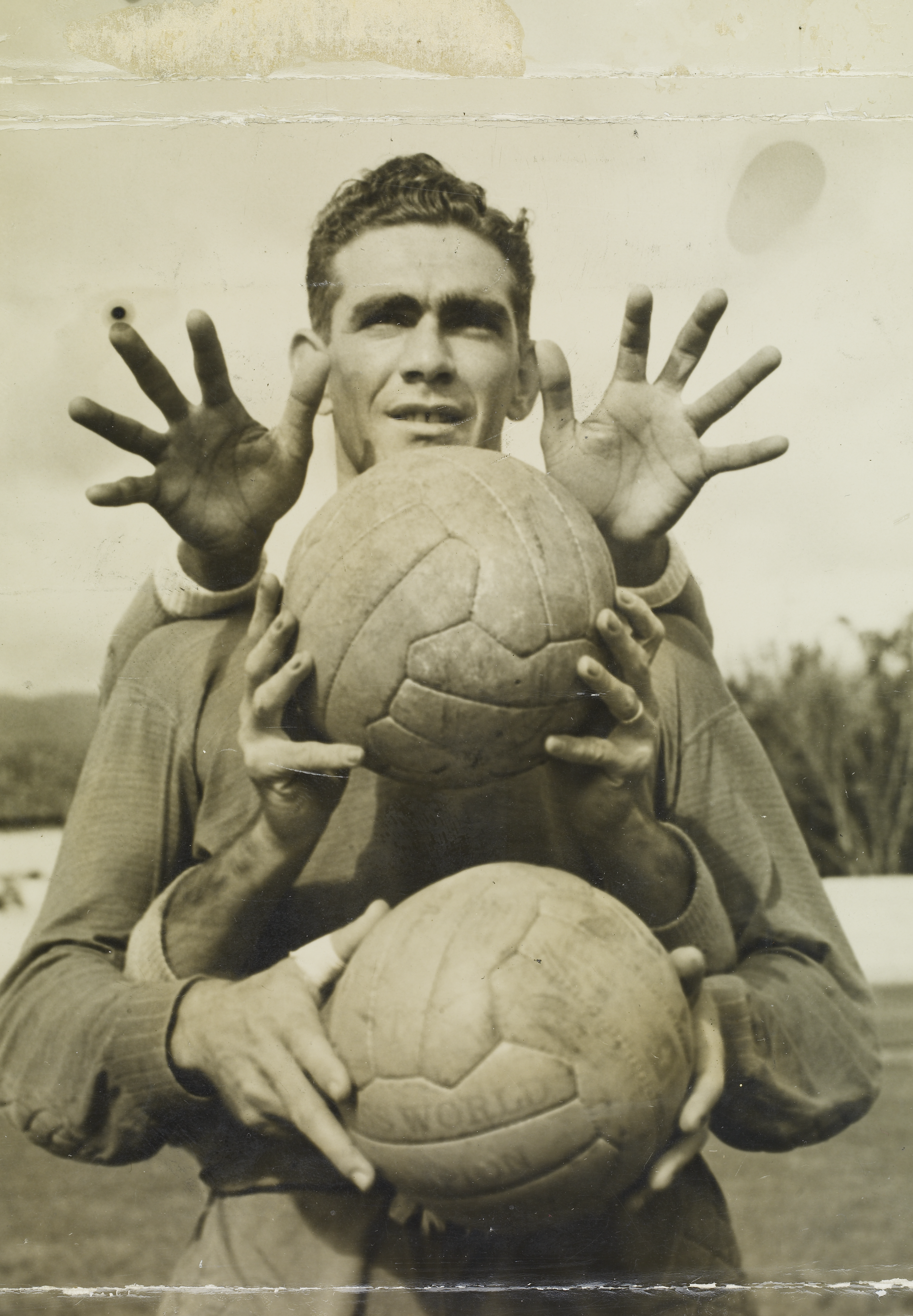
- Castilho in 1956

Personal information
- Full name: Carlos José Castilho
- Date of birth: 27 November 1927
- Place of birth: Rio de Janeiro (Rio de Janeiro), Brazil
- Date of death: 2 February 1987 (aged 59)
- Height: 1.81 m (5 ft 11 in)
- Position: Goalkeeper

Senior career*
Years	Team	Apps	(Gls)
1945	Olaria		
1947–1964	Fluminense	697	(0)
1965	Paysandu		

International career
1950–1962	Brazil	25	(0)

Managerial career
- 1973–1974: Vitória
- 1977: Operário (MS)
- 1977: Internacional
- 1980: Guarani
- 1982: Grêmio
- 1984–1986: Santos
- 1986: Palmeiras
Medal record
Men's Football
Representing Brazil
FIFA World Cup
Winner	1958 Sweden
Winner	1962 Chile
Runner-up	1950 Brazil
South American Championship
Runner-up	1953 Peru
Runner-up	1957 Peru
Runner-up	1959 Argentina
Panamerican Championship
Winner	1952 Chile
- * Club domestic league appearances and goals

Carlos José Castilho (November 27, 1927 – February 2, 1987) was a Brazilian football goalkeeper. He was born in Rio de Janeiro and played for Fluminense from 1947 to 1964 and for Brazil. He was a member of the Brazil squad in four World Cups: 1950, 1954, 1958 and 1962. Castilho has the all-time record of matches played in Fluminense FC history, with 699 appearances.

He was noted as a goalkeeper for making seemingly impossible saves. Due to his good luck, his opponents' supporters called him "Leiteria" (lucky man) and Fluminense supporters called him "Saint Castilho".

He was daltonic and he believed he was favored because he saw yellow balls as if they were red, though he had trouble at night with white balls.

During his career he appeared in 699 games for Fluminense, a club record. With Fluminense, he won 420 games, conceded 777 goals, and kept 255 clean-sheets; all individual records in Fluminense history.

After his retirement from playing sport, he coached many teams from Brazil.

He died by suicide on February 2, 1987.

== Honours ==
=== Player ===
Fluminense

- Campeonato Carioca: 1951, 1959, 1964
- Torneio Rio – São Paulo: 1957, 1960
- Copa Rio: 1952

Paysandu

- Campeonato Paraense: 1965

Brazil

- World Cup: 1958, 1962
- Panamerican Championship: 1952

Individual

- Torneio Octogonal Rivadavia Correa Meyer Team of the Tournament: 1953

=== Manager ===
Santos

- Campeonato Paulista: 1984
