= 1952 Campeonato Paulista =

This is a football club formed by the Federação Paulista de Futebol

Campeonato Paulista
- Season: 1952
- Champions: Corinthians
- Relegated: Jabaquara; Radium
- Matches played: 240
- Goals scored: 849 (3.54 per match)
- Top goalscorer: Baltazar (Corinthians) – 27 goals
- Biggest home win: Corinthians 6-0 XV de Jaú (September 7, 1952)
- Biggest away win: Nacional 1-7 Corinthians (September 14, 1952)
- Highest scoring: Palmeiras 4-6 Corinthians (January 18, 1953)

The 1952 Campeonato Paulista da Primeira Divisão, organized by the Federação Paulista de Futebol, was the 51st season of São Paulo's top professional football league. Corinthians won the title for the 14th time. Jabaquara and Radium were relegated. The top scorer was Corinthians's Baltazar with 27 goals.

== Championship ==
The championship was disputed in a double-round robin system, with the team with the most points winning the title and the two teams with the fewest points being relegated.

Pos	Team	Pld	W	D	L	GF	GA	GD	Pts	Qualification or relegation
1	Corinthians	30	25	2	3	89	33	+56	52	Champions
2	São Paulo	30	21	4	5	66	31	+35	46	
3	Portuguesa	30	18	6	6	68	44	+24	42	
4	Palmeiras	30	18	4	8	71	46	+25	40	
5	Santos	30	13	8	9	62	46	+16	34	
6	XV de Piracicaba	30	11	8	11	54	55	−1	30	
7	XV de Jaú	30	13	3	14	54	55	−1	29	
8	Comercial	30	11	6	13	44	52	−8	28	
9	Guarani	30	12	3	15	50	59	−9	27	
10	Ypiranga	30	12	2	16	48	54	−6	26	
11	Ponte Preta	30	9	5	16	54	59	−5	23	
12	Nacional	30	9	4	17	42	65	−23	22	
13	Juventus	30	9	3	18	46	66	−20	21 (Note: Head-to-head record: Portuguesa Santista 3-2 Juventus, Juventus 3-1 Portuguesa Santista)	
14	Portuguesa Santista	30	8	5	17	46	71	−25	21	
15	Jabaquara	30	6	8	16	26	52	−26	20	Relegated
16	Radium	30	6	7	17	29	61	−32	19	Relegated

Updated to match(es) played on February 1, 1953. Source: RSSSF.com
Rules for classification: 1) points; 2) head-to-head points; 3) goal difference; 4) wins.

== Results ==
Home/Away	COM	COR	GUA	JAB	JUV	NAC	PAL	PON	POR	PSA	RAD	SAN	SAO	XVJ	XVP	YPI
Comercial		1-3	2-1	0-0	1-1	1-2	3-5	1-1	1-3	3-0	2-1	4-0	1-1	2-1	2-1	1-3
Corinthians	1-0		2-1	2-0	6-2	3-0	2-1	3-2	2-1	4-0	5-0	4-1	3-2	6-0	2-2	4-0
Guarani	1-1	1-4		2-0	3-1	0-1	2-0	2-2	1-1	3-1	2-1	0-2	1-3	1-0	2-1	1-0
Jabaquara	1-2	0-0	2-5		2-0	2-1	0-0	0-1	2-2	1-1	4-0	1-1	0-2	0-0	0-0	1-0
Juventus	3-4	0-3	4-1	2-0		1-2	0-2	2-1	2-2	3-1	0-2	2-3	2-0	1-6	3-0	4-0
Nacional	1-0	1-7	1-5	6-2	1-2		0-3	2-1	3-4	0-0	2-0	2-2	1-1	2-3	3-0	0-2
Palmeiras	4-1	4-6	4-0	3-1	2-0	2-1		4-3	0-3	3-1	3-0	2-0	1-2	5-1	4-0	3-0
Ponte Preta	0-1	0-1	3-4	2-1	3-1	5-0	0-1		1-2	3-2	1-1	2-1	2-4	2-0	2-1	2-1
Portuguesa	0-1	4-3	3-1	2-0	3-1	0-0	2-2	1-4		5-1	1-0	1-1	1-0	4-2	5-3	4-2
Portuguesa Santista	1-2	1-2	3-1	1-3	3-2	2-1	4-2	3-3	0-2		3-0	0-0	1-2	2-0	2-2	1-2
Radium	1-1	0-2	3-2	2-0	4-1	0-3	3-2	2-2	0-2	0-2		1-1	0-2	2-2	0-2	1-1
Santos	3-1	2-3	4-3	4-0	2-2	4-1	4-0	3-0	3-5	4-2	4-0		0-3	3-0	2-0	5-1
São Paulo	5-2	1-2	4-0	3-1	2-1	3-1	2-2	4-2	1-0	5-0	2-0	1-0		0-4	5-2	1-0
XV de Jaú	3-2	3-1	0-1	3-1	3-1	2-3	1-2	2-1	2-1	6-2	2-1	3-1	0-2		1-1	2-0
XV de Piracicaba	2-0	2-1	4-2	3-1	1-2	3-1	2-2	4-2	4-2	5-2	1-1	2-2	0-0	3-1		2-1
Ypiranga	3-1	1-2	2-1	3-0	3-0	3-3	2-3	4-2	1-2	2-4	6-1	0-0	1-3	2-1	2-1	

== Top Scores ==
Rank	Player	Club	Goals
1	Baltazar	Corinthians	27
2	Pinga	Portuguesa	21
2	Liminha	Palmeiras	21
4	Maurinho	São Paulo	18
5	Gustavo Albella	São Paulo	15
5	Paulo Carvoeiro	Nacional	15
7	Carlyle	Santos	14
7	Octávio	Santos	14
7	Francisco Rodrígues	Palmeiras	14
10	Cláudio	Corinthians	13
