= Quincas =

Quincas may refer to:

- Quincas Borba, a novel written in 1891 by the Brazilian writer Machado de Assis
- Joaquim Albino (1931), generally known as Quincas, Brazilian footballer (Canto do Rio, Fluminense, Palmeiras)
