= Jackson Nascimento =

Brazilian footballer (1924–2026)

Jackson
Personal information
- Full name: Jackson Nascimento
- Date of birth: 24 August 1924
- Place of birth: Paranaguá, Paraná, Brazil
- Date of death: 9 September 2026 (aged 102)
- Place of death: Camboriú, Santa Catarina, Brazil
- Position: Midfielder

Youth career
- 1940–1942: Antoninense
- 1942–1944: Atlético Paranaense

Senior career*
Years	Team	Apps	(Gls)
1943–1950	Atlético Paranaense		
1950–1952	Corinthians	57	(35)
1952–1956	Atletico Paranaense		

Managerial career
- 1958: Atletico Paranaense
- * Club domestic league appearances and goals

Jackson Nascimento (24 August 1924 – 9 September 2026) was a Brazilian professional footballer who played as a midfielder.

== Career ==
Revealed by Atletico Paranaense in 1943, Jackson Nascimento played for the club until 1950, being state champion in 1943, 1945 and 1949. In 1950 he transferred to Corinthians, where he was state champion in 1952. He returned to Athletico where he retired in 1956, and became the second highest scorer in history (just behind Sicupira), with 143 goals in 196 matches, totaling both spells.

== Personal life and death ==
After retiring at age 30 as a player, Jackson returned as a coach in 1958, becoming state champion once again with Athletico. He decided to leave football permanently and trained as a lawyer. Nascimento turned 100 on 24 August 2024, and died on 9 September 2026, at the age of 102. He was believed to be the world's oldest-living footballer at the time of his death. His successor is believed to be Kevin O'Neill.

== Honours ==
=== Player ===
Athletico Paranaense

- Campeonato Paranaense: 1943, 1945, 1949

Corinthians

- Campeonato Paulista: 1951, 1952

Individual

- 1953 Campeonato Paranaense top scorer: 21 goals

=== Manager ===
Athletico Paranaense

- Campeonato Paranaense: 1958
