= Píndaro (footballer, born 1925) =

Brazilian footballer (1925 - 2008)

- Píndaro (left) with Leônidas (center)

Personal information
- Full name: Píndaro Possidonti Marconi
- Date of birth: 12 March 1925
- Place of birth: Santo Antônio de Pádua, Brazil
- Date of death: 7 August 2008 (aged 83)
- Place of death: Rio de Janeiro, Brazil
- Position: Defender

Youth career
- Paduano

Senior career*
Years	Team	Apps	(Gls)
1944	Paduano		
1945–1956	Fluminense	256	(0)
- * Club domestic league appearances and goals as of 7 February 2024

Píndaro Possidonti Marconi (12 March 1925 – 7 August 2008), simply known as Píndaro, was a Brazilian footballer who played as a defender.

== Career ==
One of the main players in Fluminense's history, he formed a trio with Carlos Castilho and Pinheiro that became known as "Santissima Trindade" (Holy Trinity). He stood out for his clean tackles, never being warned by the referee. Píndaro was called up to the Brazil national football team in 1950, but because he disagreed with the style of play proposed by Flávio Costa, resigned, never playing for Brazil. He retired at the age of 31 to take over a pharmacy, his father's business.

== Honours ==
Fluminense

- Campeonato Carioca: 1951
- Copa Rio: 1952
- Taça da Prefeitura do Distrito Federal: 1948

== Death ==
Píndaro died on 7 August 2008, at Hospital Evangélico, Rio de Janeiro, victim of multiple organ failure.
