= 1953 Pequeña Copa del Mundo de Clubes =

1953 Pequeña Copa del Mundo de Clubes may refer to:

- 1953 Pequeña Copa del Mundo de Clubes (1st tournament)
- 1953 Pequeña Copa del Mundo de Clubes (2nd tournament)
