= Altair (footballer) =

Brazilian footballer (1938–2019)

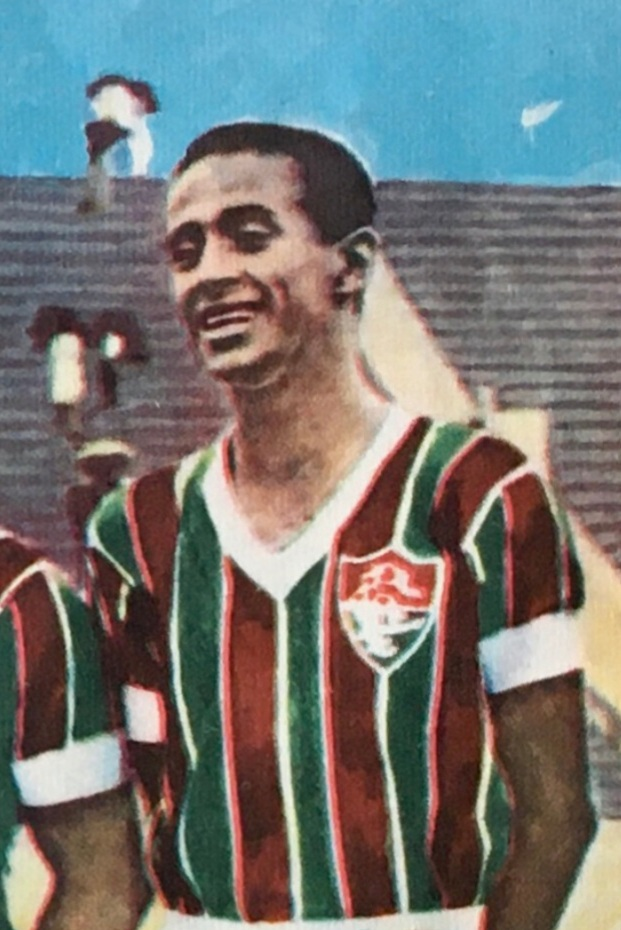
- Altair in 1960

Personal information
- Full name: Altair Gomes de Figueiredo
- Date of birth: 22 January 1938
- Place of birth: Niterói, Brazil
- Date of death: 9 August 2019 (aged 81)
- Place of death: São Gonçalo, Rio de Janeiro, Brazil
- Height: 1.73 m (5 ft 8 in)
- Position: Left-back

Senior career*
Years	Team	Apps	(Gls)
1955–1971	Fluminense	551	(2)

International career
1959–1966	Brazil	18	(0)

Managerial career
- 1992: Fluminense (interim)
- 1996: Fluminense (interim)
- 1997: Fluminense (interim)
- 1998: Fluminense (interim)
Medal record
Men's Football
Representing Brazil
FIFA World Cup
Winner	1962 Chile
- * Club domestic league appearances and goals

Altair Gomes de Figueiredo, usually referred to as Altair (22 January 1938 – 9 August 2019), was a Brazilian footballer who played as a left-back and a World Champion for Brazil in the 1962 World Cup.

He spent his entire career at Fluminense, for which he played 551 games, scoring twice. He was called "magro" (slim) because he was skinny and despite his modest physical appearance, was a tough tackler and tremendous marker. His duels with Garrincha were legendary. He retired from playing in 1971 aged 33.

== Honours ==
Fluminense

- Torneio Rio – São Paulo: 1957, 1960
- Campeonato Carioca: 1959, 1964, 1969

Brazil

- FIFA World Cup: 1962
