= Torneio das Missões =

1953 Torneio das Missões
Taça Tibiriçá

Tournament details
- Country: São Paulo, Brazil
- Dates: 8 – 15 March
- Teams: 3

Final positions
- Champions: Corinthians
- Runners-up: Palmeiras

Tournament statistics
- Matches played: 3
- Goals scored: 10 (3.33 per match)
- Top goal scorer(s): Odair (Palmeiras); 2 goals

The Torneio das Missõess, also called Taça Tibiriçá, was a triangular competition held in 1953 reuniting the Trio de Ferro (English: Iron Trio) with the aim of helping those affected by the drought in northeastern region of Brazil.

== Matches ==
8 March

Corinthians	1–0	Palmeiras
Mário	Report (Meu Timão); Report (Verdazzo)

Pacaembu, São Paulo
Referee: Amaral Sobrinho
12 March

Corinthians	3–2	São Paulo
Nilo 7' (o.g.); Nardo 34'; Carbone 52' (pen.)	Report	Turcão 50' (pen.); Gomes 77'

Pacaembu, São Paulo
Referee: Amaral Sobrinho
15 March

Palmeiras	4–0	São Paulo
Jair 15'; Liminha 62'; Odair 65' (pen.), 70'	Report

Pacaembu, São Paulo
Referee: Caetano Bovino

== Final standings ==
Team	Pts	P	W	D	L	GF	GA	GD
Corinthians	4	2	2	0	0	4	2	+2
Palmeiras	2	2	1	0	1	4	1	+3
São Paulo	0	2	0	0	2	2	7	-5

== Champion ==
1953 Torneio das Missões
(São Paulo (state))
Corinthians
1st title
