= Gustavo Albella =

Argentine footballer (1925–2000)

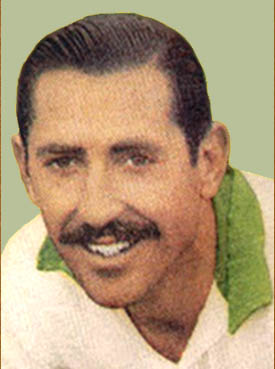
- Albella during his tenure on Banfield

Personal information
- Date of birth: 25 August 1925
- Place of birth: Alta Gracia
- Date of death: 13 June 2000 (aged 74)
- Position: Forward

Youth career
- Sportivo Alta Gracia

Senior career*
| Years | Team | Apps | (Gls) |
| 1943–1944 | Talleres RdE | 36 | (29) |
| 1945 | Boca Juniors | 7 | (6) |
| 1946–1951 | Banfield | 153 | (71) |
| 1952–1954 | São Paulo | 81 | (47) |
| 1955–1956 | Banfield | 80 | (65) |
| 1957–1961 | Green Cross | 122 | (68) |
| Total | | 479 | (286) |
- * Club domestic league appearances and goals

Gustavo Albella (25 August 1925 – 13 June 2000) was an Argentine footballer who played as a forward for clubs in Argentina, Brazil and Chile.

Albella remains as the all-time top scorer for Banfield, with 136 goals (71 in Primera División and 65 in Primera B).

== Career ==
Albella started playing at Sportivo Alta Gracia in his hometown. He also played in other clubs of the city such as 25 de Mayo and Club Colón. In 1943 he moved to Buenos Aires to play for Talleres de Remedios de Escalada, then playing in the second division, Primera B Metropolitana. After a good performance in a friendly v Boca Juniors, the club acquired Albella as substitute player of Jaime Sarlanga. In Talleres (where he was an idol for the institution), Albella played a total of 36 official matches, scoring 29 goals.

Albella played for Boca Juniors during the 1945 season, alternating between the senior squad and the reserve team. When Sarlanga was injured, Albella replaced him as centre forward, scoring six goals. At the same time, he was completing the military service, where a lieutenant who was linked to C.A. Banfield, offered him to play for the club.

In Banfield, Albella debuted in the Primera B tournament, in 1946. The squad won the championship with 14 points ahead Gimnasia y Esgrima La Plata, which finished 2nd. Banfield set also a record of 28 matches unbeaten (achieved during the first 28 rounds). Albella remained in Banfield until 1951, when he was traded to Brazilian São Paulo FC. During his tenure on the club, he switched from forward to midfielder, winning the 1953 Campeonato Paulista.

In 1955 Albella returned to Banfield, playing one season before moving to Chile to play for Green Cross, winning the 1960 Segunda División title before retiring from football.

During his two tenures on Banfield, Albella totalised 136 goals for C.A. Banfield, becoming the all-time top scorer of the club.

== Titles ==
Banfield

- Primera B Metropolitana (1): 1946

São Paulo

- Campeonato Paulista (1): 1953

Green Cross

- Segunda División (1): 1960

== Honours ==
- Green Cross 1957 and 1958 (Top Scorer Chilean Championship)
