= Sicupira =

Brazilian footballer

Personal information
- Full name: Barcímio Sicupira Júnior
- Date of birth: 10 May 1944
- Place of birth: Lapa, Brazil
- Date of death: 7 November 2021 (aged 77)
- Place of death: Curitiba, Brazil
- Positions: Attacking midfielder; forward

Senior career*
| Years | Team | Apps | (Gls) |
| 1962–1963 | Ferroviário-PR | | |
| 1964–1967 | Botafogo | | |
| 1967–1968 | Botafogo-SP | | |
| 1968–1976 | Atlético Paranaense | | (157) |
| 1972 | → Corinthians (loan) | 22 | (4) |
- * Club domestic league appearances and goals as of 6 October 2024

Barcímio Sicupira Júnior (10 May 1944 – 7 November 2021), simply known as Sicupira, was a Brazilian professional footballer who played as a forward.

== Career ==
Revealed by CA Ferroviário, Sicupira also defended Botafogo FR, where he played alongside Garrincha and won the state and Rio-São Paulo in 1967, at Botafogo de Ribeirão Preto, and later at Athletico Paranaense, where he became an idol and the greatest scorer in the club's history with 157 goals. He was largely responsible for winning the state in 1970. Sicupira also spent time on loan at Corinthians in 1972, with 22 appearances.

== Death ==
Sicupira died on 7 November 2021 at the age of 77 in Curitiba, after an unsuccessful lung surgery.

== Honours ==
Botafogo

- Torneio Rio–São Paulo: 1964
- Campeonato Carioca: 1967
- Taça Guanabara: 1967
- Taça Círculo de Periódicos Esportivos: 1966
- Troféu Triangular de Caracas: 1967

Athletico Paranaense

- Campeonato Paranaense: 1970

Individual

- 1970 Campeonato Paranaense top scorer: 20 goals
- 1972 Campeonato Paranaense top scorer: 29 goals
