= 1960 Campeonato Nacional Segunda División =

Segunda División
- Season: 1960
- Champions: Green Cross
- Promoted: Green Cross
- Relegated: Alianza de Curicó

The 1960 Segunda División de Chile was the 9th season of the Segunda División de Chile.

Green Cross was the tournament's winner.

== Table ==
| Pos | Team | Pld | W | D | L | GF | GA | GD | Pts |
|---|---|---|---|---|---|---|---|---|---|
| 1 | Green Cross (C, P) | 22 | 16 | 4 | 2 | 56 | 28 | +28 | 36 |
| 2 | Deportes La Serena | 22 | 14 | 3 | 5 | 63 | 26 | +37 | 31 |
| 3 | Unión San Felipe | 22 | 13 | 4 | 5 | 39 | 27 | +12 | 30 |
| 4 | Ñublense | 22 | 9 | 6 | 7 | 30 | 26 | +4 | 24 |
| 5 | Trasandino | 22 | 8 | 7 | 7 | 33 | 28 | +5 | 23 |
| 6 | Unión La Calera | 22 | 9 | 5 | 8 | 42 | 37 | +5 | 23 |
| 7 | Colchagua | 22 | 8 | 5 | 9 | 37 | 35 | +2 | 21 |
| 8 | Coquimbo Unido | 22 | 7 | 4 | 11 | 34 | 47 | −13 | 18 |
| 9 | Iberia | 22 | 6 | 6 | 10 | 26 | 43 | −17 | 18 |
| 10 | San Bernardo Central | 22 | 4 | 6 | 12 | 34 | 48 | −14 | 14 |
| 11 | Universidad Técnica del Estado | 22 | 5 | 4 | 13 | 23 | 50 | −27 | 14 |
| 12 | Alianza de Curicó (R) | 22 | 4 | 4 | 14 | 32 | 54 | −22 | 12 |

Source: rsssf.com
(C) Champions; (P) Promoted; (R) Relegated

== See also ==
- Chilean football league system
