= Luis Aloy =

Spanish footballer and manager (1930–2012)

Personal information
- Full name: Luis Aloy Vidal
- Date of birth: 8 February 1930
- Place of birth: Santa Coloma de Gramenet, Spain
- Date of death: 8 June 2012 (aged 82)
- Place of death: Barcelona, Spain
- Position: Midfielder

Senior career*
Years	Team	Apps	(Gls)
1949–1950	España Industrial		
1950–1954	Barcelona	16	(5)
1954–1958	Oviedo	112	(59)
1958–1959	Cádiz	25	(6)
1959–1961	Sabadell	66	(21)
1961–1962	Badalona		
1962–1963	Figueres		
1963–1964	Sants		

Managerial career
- 1965–1969: Gramenet
- 1969–1970: Andorra
- 1970: Sant Andreu (youth)
- 1970–1972: Sant Andreu
- 1972–1976: Barcelona Atlètic
- 1976: Valladolid
- 1977: Zamora
- 1977–1979: Logroñés
- 1979–1980: Pontevedra
- 1980–1981: Lleida
- 1981–1983: Sant Andreu
- 1983–1984: Andorra
- 1984–1985: Olot
- 1985–1987: Manlleu
- 1987–1988: Gramenet
- 1988: Manlleu
- 1989: Badalona
- 1989–1991: Manlleu (youth)
- 1991–1993: Manlleu (assistant)
- 1993: Manlleu
- 1993–1999: Vilafranca
- 1999–2000: Calafell
- * Club domestic league appearances and goals

Luis Aloy Vidal (8 February 1930 – 8 June 2012) was a Spanish professional football player and manager.

== Career ==
Born in Santa Coloma de Gramenet, Barcelona, Catalonia, Aloy played as a midfielder for FC Barcelona between 1950 and 1954. He later played for Real Oviedo, Cádiz, Sabadell and Figueres.

Aloy was later manager of Barcelona Atlètic and Real Valladolid.

== Later life and death ==
Aloy died on 8 June 2012.
