= Orlando Pingo de Ouro =

Brazilian association football player (1923–2004)

Personal information
- Full name: Orlando de Azevedo Viana
- Date of birth: December 4, 1923
- Place of birth: Recife, Pernambuco, Brazil
- Date of death: 4 August 2004 (aged 80)
- Place of death: Rio de Janeiro, Brazil
- Position: Midfielder

Youth career
- Náutico

Senior career*
Years	Team	Apps	(Gls)
1942–1945	Náutico		
1945–1954	Fluminense	310	(186)
1954	Santos		
1954–1955	Atlético Mineiro		
1956	Botafogo		
1956–1957	Canto do Rio		

International career
1949	Brazil		
- * Club domestic league appearances and goals

Orlando de Azevedo Viana, commonly known as Orlando Pingo de Ouro ("golden drop") (December 4, 1923 – August 4, 2004) was a Brazilian footballer, who played as a left midfielder.

== Football career ==
Orlando began his career at Náutico and defended the colors of Fluminense playing between 1945 and 1954, scoring 186 goals in 310 matches for Flu, making him top scorer in the 1946 Carioca Championship and the 1952 Rio Cup

His debut for Fluminense at Laranjeiras Stadium was in the 2–1 victory over America FC on August 5, 1945, having scored the winning goal in the 38th minute of the second half, against 13,113 paying fans, plus the tricolor members present at the Laranjeiras Stadium that afternoon.

His nickname was given after scoring 4 goals on a rainy day against Bonsucesso FC, with journalist José Araújo writing the day after, that Orlando "looked like a drop of water present all over the lawn and shining as if it were gold".

Still for Fluminense, Orlando was champion of the 1948 Municipal Tournament (when he scored in the final against CR Vasco da Gama with a bicycle goal), having been the top scorer in this competition with 12 goals, and champion in Rio in 1946 and 1951. He would be champion also the 1952 Rio Cup and the Torneio Inicio of 1954 and 1956.

Orlando is the biggest tricolor scorer against the traditional rival America, with 15 goals, 13 for the Campeonato Carioca and 2 for the Municipal Tournament.

For the Brazil, he was a South American champion in 1949, when he played his 3 games for the seleção canarinho, scoring 2 goals (1 in each game) in the victories over Colombia(5–0) and Peru (7–1), also participating with great performance of the victory in the final against Uruguay (5–1).

Short and slight, he was considered to be fast and intelligent, and putting himself in the position to score goals, becoming the second highest scorer in the history of Fluminense FC.

He moved to Santos FC and, in a few months, he was playing at Clube Atlético Mineiro, in Minas Gerais, where he had to live with a drama: the triple taboo. Atlético led the number of state titles, had more achievements than their rivals Cruzeiro, América Mineiro and Villa Nova, but all their rivals had already been three-time champions, and of the big ones, only the Rooster who did not.

Orlando helped the team, led by Uruguayan Ricardo Díez, to finally break that mark (after 39 championships), by acting with Ubaldo, Amorim, Joel, Afonso, Osvaldo, Zé do Monte, Tomazinho and other beasts on Sunday afternoons in Campo do Sete (as the Independência Stadium was called, currently popularly known as the "Horto trapdoor").

== Main titles ==
Fluminense

- Copa Rio: 1952
- Campeonato Carioca: 1946 e 1951
- Torneio Municipal: 1948
- Torneio Início do Campeonato Carioca: 1954 e 1956
- Torneio José de Paula Júnior: 1952
- Copa das Municipalidades do Paraná: 1953
- Taça Benemérito João Lira Filho – (inauguração do estádio do Olaria: 1947 (Fluminense versus Vasco)
- Taça V.C Borba: 1947 (Atlético PR versus Flu)
- Taça Folha da Tarde: 1949 (Internacional-RS versus Flu)
- Taça Casa Nemo: 1949
- Troféu Prefeito Acrisio Moreira da Rocha: 1949 (Fla-Flu)
- Taça Secretário da Viação de Obras Públicas da Bahia: 1951 (Esporte Clube Bahia versus Fluminense)
- Taça Madalena Copello: 1951 (Fla-Flu)
- Taça Desafio: 1954 (Fluminense versus Uberaba)

Atlético Mineiro

Seleção Brasileira

- Campeonato Sul-Americano de 1949
