= Radium Futebol Clube =

Brazilian football club

Radium
- Full name: Radium Futebol Clube
- Nickname(s): Verdão da Mogiana
- Founded: May 1, 1919
- Ground: Estádio São Sebastião, Mococa, São Paulo state, Brazil
- Capacity: 5,300
- 2013: Paulista 2ªDivisão, 41st
| Home colours | Away colours |

Radium Futebol Clube, commonly known as Radium, is a currently inactive Brazilian football club based in Mococa, São Paulo state.

The club's home colours are green and white and the team mascot is a parakeet.

== History ==
The club was founded on May 1, 1919, after the merger of local clubs Operário Futebol Clube and Mocoquense Futebol Clube. Radium won the Campeonato Paulista Série A2 and the Campeonato Paulista do Interior in 1950.

== Honours ==
- Campeonato Paulista Série A2
  - Winners (1): 1950

== Stadium ==
Radium Futebol Clube play their home games at Estádio Olímpico de São Sebastião, commonly known as Estádio São Sebastião. The stadium has a maximum capacity of 5,000 people.

== Indoor team ==
They had a very good indoor team in the late '50s. Pelé played there.
