= Fritz Kominek =

Austrian footballer (1927–2002)

Personal information
- Date of birth: 15 January 1927
- Place of birth: Vienna, Austria
- Date of death: 25 October 2002 (aged 75)
- Height: 1.66 m (5 ft 5 in)
- Position: Midfielder

Senior career*
Years	Team	Apps	(Gls)
1945–1955	Austria Wien		
1955–1956	Nîmes		
1956–1957	Strasbourg		
1957–1960	Lens		
1960–1962	Marseille		
1962	1. Schwechater SC		
1963	First Vienna FC		
1963–1964	FC Grenchen		

International career
1945–1953	Austria	6	(1)

Managerial career
- 1963–1966: Grenchen
- 1966–1967: 1. Wiener Neustädter SC
- 1967–1969: Grazer AK
- 1969: 1. Wiener Neustädter SC
- 1970–1971: Fribourg
- * Club domestic league appearances and goals

Fritz Kominek (15 January 1927 – 25 October 2002) was an Austrian football player and manager. A midfielder, he played for clubs in Austria, France and Switzerland and made six appearances for the Austria national team from 1945 to 1953.
