= 1953 in Brazilian football =

Football in Brazil
- Season: 1953

The following article presents a summary of the 1953 football (soccer) season in Brazil, which was the 52nd season of competitive football in the country.

== Torneio Rio-São Paulo ==
Final Standings

Position	Team	Points	Played	Won	Drawn	Lost	For	Against	Difference
1	Corinthians	11	9	5	2	2	22	13	9
2	Vasco da Gama	11	9	4	3	2	13	9	4
3	São Paulo	10	9	4	2	3	12	9	3
4	Botafogo	10	9	3	4	2	16	14	2
5	Fluminense	9	9	3	3	3	18	16	2
6	Bangu	8	9	4	0	5	17	19	-2
7	Palmeiras	8	9	2	4	3	19	22	-3
8	Flamengo	8	9	1	6	2	14	20	-6
8	Santos	7	9	3	1	5	20	22	-2
10	Portuguesa	7	9	3	1	5	13	20	-7

Corinthians declared as the Torneio Rio-São Paulo champions.

== State championship champions ==
State	Champion	State	Champion
Acre	Atlético Acreano	Paraíba	Botafogo-PB
Alagoas	ASA; Ferroviário-AL^{(1)}	Paraná	Ferroviario-PR
Amapá	Amapá	Pernambuco	Sport Recife
Amazonas	América-AM	Piauí	River
Bahia	Vitória	Rio de Janeiro	Barra Mansa; Barra Mansa^{(2)}
Ceará	Fortaleza	Rio de Janeiro (DF)	Flamengo
Espírito Santo	Santo Antônio	Rio Grande do Norte	ABC
Goiás	Goiânia	Rio Grande do Sul	Internacional
Maranhão	Sampaio Corrêa	Rondônia	Ypiranga-RO
Mato Grosso	Mixto	Santa Catarina	Carlos Renaux
Minas Gerais	Atlético Mineiro	São Paulo	São Paulo
Pará	Remo	Sergipe	Vasco-SE

^{(1)}ASA and Ferroviário-AL shared the 1953 Campeonato Alagoano title.

^{(2)}In 1953, two competitions were contested in Rio de Janeiro. The first one was a regular state championship, played only by Vale do Paraíba teams and the second one was named Supercampeonato (Superchampionship), which was an extra tournament played by the champions of Niterói, Campos dos Goytacazes and Vale do Paraíba local competitions.

== Brazilian clubs in international competitions ==
Team	Torneio Octogonal Rivadavia Corrêa Meyer 1953
Botafogo	First stage
Corinthians	Semifinals
Fluminense	Semifinals
São Paulo	Runner-up
Vasco	Champions

== Brazil national team ==
The following table lists all the games played by the Brazil national football team in official competitions and friendly matches during 1953.

Date	Opposition	Result	Score	Brazil scorers	Competition
March 1, 1953	Bolivia	W	8-1	Pinga (2), Julinho (4), Rodrigues (2)	South American Championship
March 12, 1953	Ecuador	W	2-0	Cláudio Pinho, Ademir Menezes	South American Championship
March 15, 1953	Uruguay	W	1-0	Ipojucan	South American Championship
March 19, 1953	Peru	L	0-1	-	South American Championship
March 23, 1953	Chile	W	3-2	Julinho, Zizinho, Baltazar	South American Championship
March 27, 1953	Paraguay	L	1-2	Nílton Santos	South American Championship
April 1, 1953	Paraguay	L	2-3	Baltazar (2)	South American Championship
