= Atis Monteiro =

Brazilian footballer

Atis
Personal information
- Full name: Atis Monteiro
- Date of birth: 6 April 1932
- Place of birth: Campinas, Brazil
- Date of death: 27 August 2025 (aged 93)
- Place of death: Campinas, Brazil
- Position: Midfielder

Youth career
- Ponte Preta

Senior career*
Years	Team	Apps	(Gls)
1948–1952	Ponte Preta		
1953–1956	Portuguesa	103	(39)
1956–1957	Fluminense		
1958–1959	Ponte Preta		
- * Club domestic league appearances and goals as of 26 February 2024

Atis Monteiro (6 April 1932 – 27 August 2025), simply known as Atis, was a Brazilian professional footballer who played as a midfielder.

== Career ==
Revealed at Ponte Preta in 1948, Atis played for the club until 1953. He went down in history for being the first player to score a hat-trick during a Derby Campineiro match, on 6 July 1952. In 1953 he went to Portuguesa where he was part of the Rio-São Paulo winning team in 1955. In 1956 he was transferred to Fluminense alongside his midfield teammate, Julinho Botelho. Feeling pain, he played little, returning to Ponte Preta where he ended his career.

== Honours ==
Portuguesa

- Torneio Rio-São Paulo: 1955

== Death ==
Atis Monteiro died in Campinas on 27 August 2025, at the age of 93.
