= 1951 in Brazilian football =

Football in Brazil
- Season: 1951

The following article presents a summary of the 1951 football (soccer) season in Brazil, which was the 50th season of competitive football in the country.

== Torneio Rio-São Paulo ==
Final Standings

Position	Team	Points	Played	Won	Drawn	Lost	For	Against	Difference
1	Palmeiras	10	7	5	0	2	25	14	11
2	Corinthians	10	7	4	2	1	20	12	8
3	Bangu	7	7	3	1	3	22	18	4
4	Flamengo	7	7	3	1	3	15	19	-4
5	América	7	7	2	3	2	19	19	0
6	Portuguesa	7	7	3	1	3	17	23	-6
7	Vasco da Gama	6	7	1	4	2	15	18	-3
8	São Paulo	2	7	0	2	5	8	18	-10

Championship playoff

April 8, 1951

Palmeiras	3–2	Corinthians

April 11, 1951

Corinthians	1–3	Palmeiras

Palmeiras declared as the Torneio Rio-São Paulo champions.

== State championship champions ==
State	Champion	State	Champion
Acre	Rio Branco-AC	Paraíba	not disputed
Alagoas	CRB	Paraná	Coritiba
Amapá	Amapá	Pernambuco	Náutico
Amazonas	América-AM	Piauí	River
Bahia	Ypiranga-BA	Rio de Janeiro	Adrianino
Ceará	Ceará	Rio de Janeiro (DF)	Fluminense
Espírito Santo	Rio Branco-ES	Rio Grande do Norte	América-RN
Goiás	Goiânia	Rio Grande do Sul	Internacional
Maranhão	Maranhão	Rondônia	Ferroviário-RO
Mato Grosso	Mixto	Santa Catarina	América-SC
Minas Gerais	Villa Nova	São Paulo	Corinthians
Pará	Tuna Luso	Sergipe	Confiança

== Brazilian clubs in international competitions ==
Team	Copa Rio 1951
Palmeiras	Champions
Vasco	Semifinals

== Brazil national team ==
The Brazil national football team did not play any matches in 1951.
