= Carlyle Guimarães =

Brazilian footballer (1926–1982)

Carlyle
Personal information
- Full name: Carlyle Guimarães Cardoso
- Date of birth: 15 June 1926
- Place of birth: Almenara, Brazil
- Date of death: 23 November 1982 (aged 56)
- Place of death: Belo Horizonte, Brazil
- Height: 1.80 m (5 ft 11 in)
- Position: Forward

Youth career
- 1943–1946: Tabajaras-MG

Senior career*
Years	Team	Apps	(Gls)
1946–1949	Atlético Mineiro	68	(53)
1949–1952	Fluminense	105	(63)
1953	Palmeiras	10	(4)
1953	Santos		
1954–1956	Botafogo		
1957	Portuguesa-RJ		

International career
1948	Brazil	1	(1)

Managerial career
- 1968: Brazil
- * Club domestic league appearances and goals

Carlyle Guimarães Cardoso (15 June 1926 – 23 November 1982), simply known as Carlyle, was a Brazilian professional footballer who played as a forward.

== Career ==
A player who was marked by the beauty of his goals, Carlyle played mainly for Atlético Mineiro and Fluminense, being state champion for both teams, and being top scorer in 1951. He also played for Santos, Palmeiras, Botafogo and Portuguesa-RJ.

Carlyle played only once for the Brazil national team, 11 April 1948, in a friendly against Uruguay, and also scored a goal.

He worked for years as a sports commentator and columnist, and in 1968 he was part of the Minas Gerais press committee that led the Brazil national team in a friendly against Argentina.

== Death ==
Carlyle Guimarães died after being run over at a bus stop, 23 November 1982, in Belo Horizonte. The entrance street to the Atlético Mineiro training center was named in honor of him.

== Honours ==
Atlético Mineiro

- Campeonato Mineiro: 1947

Fluminense

- Campeonato Carioca: 1951

Individual

- 1951 Campeonato Carioca top scorer: 23 goals
