= Brazilian Sports Confederation =

Former confederation of sports in Brazil

CONMEBOL
- Short name: CBD
- Founded: 20 August 1914; 111 years ago
- Folded: 24 September 1979; 46 years ago
- Headquarters: Rio de Janeiro
- FIFA affiliation: 1923
- CONMEBOL affiliation: 1916

The Brazilian Sports Confederation (Portuguese: Confederação Brasileira de Desportos), Brazilian Portuguese pronunciation: [kõfe.de.ɾaˈsãw bɾa.ziˈlej.ɾɐ dʒi desˈpɔʁ.tʊs], also known by the acronym CBD, was the main sports confederation of the country of Brazil, founded on 20 August 1914, which was responsible for organizing all sports in the country.

It was created with the mission of promoting all sports practice throughout the national territory. Among the sports it governed were tennis, athletics, swimming, water polo, handball, football, and any sporting activity not belonging to a self-standing institution.

Football played a prominent role since the statute stated that it constituted "the basic and essential sport of the Confederação Brasileira de Desportos". The CBD was born to overcome the contrasts between the Federação Brasileira de Futebol (FBF) and the Federação Brasileira de Sports (FBS), the two bodies that competed for hegemony in the organization of football in the country, an expression of the State of São Paulo and State of Rio de Janeiro football movement respectively. The establishment of the CBD led to the extinction of the two state entities on 21 June 1916, and in the same year, there was affiliation to CONMEBOL. On 20 May 1923, it obtained affiliation to the FIFA. The Confederation also represented most of the Brazilian states in the sports sector.

On 24 September 1979, after undergoing changes to its structure, the Confederação Brasileira de Desportos became the Confederação Brasileira de Futebol (CBF), mainly as a consequence of a FIFA decree, according to which all national football entities should be focused solely on the development of football. This was not the case with the CBD, which at the time was involved in promoting all Olympic sports.

Today each sport has its own confederation, and the entity that plays the role of developing the sport today through a global strategy and coordinating with all modalities is the Brazilian Olympic Committee.
