= 1946 Campeonato Carioca =

Campeonato Carioca
- Season: 1946
- Champions: Fluminense
- Matches played: 102
- Goals scored: 498 (4.88 per match)
- Top goalscorer: Rodrigues (Fluminense) – 28 goals
- Biggest home win: Botafogo 10-0 Bonsucesso (September 14, 1946); Fluminense 11-1 Bangu (September 21, 1946)
- Biggest away win: Bonsucesso 0-10 Flamengo (November 2, 1946)
- Highest scoring: Fluminense 9-3 Madureira (August 4, 1946); Fluminense 11-1 Bangu (September 21, 1946); Fluminense 8-4 América (November 24, 1946)

The 1946 edition of the Campeonato Carioca kicked off on July 6, 1946 and ended on December 28, 1946. It was organized by FMF (Federação Metropolitana de Futebol, or Metropolitan Football Federation). Ten teams participated. Fluminense won the title for the 15th time. no teams were relegated.

== System ==
The tournament would be disputed in a double round-robin format, with the team with the most points winning the title.

== Torneio Relâmpago ==
Pos	Team	Pld	W	D	L	GF	GA	GD	Pts	Qualification or relegation
1	Vasco da Gama	5	3	1	1	11	5	+6	7	Champions
2	América	5	2	2	1	8	7	+1	6	
3	Flamengo	5	1	2	2	8	10	−2	4	
4	Fluminense	5	3	0	2	10	8	+2	6	
5	Botafogo	5	1	2	2	9	15	−6	4	
6	São Cristóvão	5	1	1	3	8	9	−1	3	

Updated to match(es) played on April 3, 1946. Source: RSSSF.com
Rules for classification: 1) points; 2) goal difference; 3) wins; 4) number of goals scored.

== Top Scores ==
Rank	Player	Club	Goals
1	Vealu	Flamengo	4
1	Otávio	Botafogo	4
3	Ismael	Fluminense	3
3	Pascoal	Fluminense	3

== Torneio Municipal ==
Pos	Team	Pld	W	D	L	GF	GA	GD	Pts	Qualification or relegation
1	Vasco da Gama	9	6	3	0	32	5	+27	15	Playoffs
2	Fluminense	9	7	1	1	30	11	+19	15	Playoffs
3	América	9	7	0	2	23	14	+9	14	
4	Botafogo	9	6	1	2	34	13	+21	13	
5	São Cristóvão	9	5	1	3	23	17	+6	11	
6	Bangu	9	3	2	4	15	20	−5	8	
7	Flamengo	9	3	0	6	33	23	+10	6	
8	Canto do Rio	9	1	2	6	13	39	−26	4	
9	Bonsucesso	9	1	1	7	10	50	−40	3	
10	Madureira	9	0	2	7	12	33	−21	2	

Updated to match(es) played on June 16, 1946. Source: RSSSF.com
Rules for classification: 1) points; 2) goal difference; 3) wins; 4) number of goals scored.

=== Playoffs ===
19 June 1946 Final	Fluminense	4 – 1	Vasco da Gama	Laranjeiras, Rio de Janeiro
	Bigode 29'; Rodrigues 40'; Juvenal 50' 68'		Chico 46'	Attendance: 17,638; Referee: Mário Vianna

23 June 1946 Final	Vasco da Gama	2 – 0	Fluminense	São Januário, Rio de Janeiro
	Eugen 17'; Lelé 30'			Attendance: 24,369; Referee: Alzilar Costa

26 June 1946 Final	Vasco da Gama	1 – 0	Fluminense	São Januário, Rio de Janeiro
	Chico 36'			Attendance: c. 27,000; Referee: Guilherme Gomes

== Top Scores ==
Rank	Player	Club	Goals
1	Heleno de Freitas	Botafogo	13
2	José Perácio	Flamengo	8
3	Francisco Rodrigues	Fluminense	7
3	Ademir de Menezes	Fluminense	7
5	Zizinho	Flamengo	6
5	Lelé	Vasco da Gama	6
5	Isaías	Vasco da Gama	6

== Championship ==
Pos	Team	Pld	W	D	L	GF	GA	GD	Pts	Qualification or relegation
1	Fluminense	18	13	0	5	74	36	+38	26	Playoffs
2	Botafogo	18	11	4	3	58	25	+33	26	Playoffs
3	Flamengo	18	12	2	4	72	33	+39	26	Playoffs
4	América	18	13	0	5	51	33	+18	26	Playoffs
5	Vasco da Gama	18	8	6	4	42	33	+9	22	
6	São Cristóvão	18	9	2	7	38	32	+6	20	
7	Canto do Rio	18	6	0	12	28	54	−26	12	
8	Bangu	18	5	1	12	32	68	−36	11	
9	Madureira	18	3	2	13	31	64	−33	8	
10	Bonsucesso	18	1	1	16	23	72	−49	3	

Updated to match(es) played on November 10, 1946. Source: RSSSF.com
Rules for classification: 1) points; 2) goal difference; 3) wins; 4) number of goals scored.

=== Playoffs ===
Pos	Team	Pld	W	D	L	GF	GA	GD	Pts	Qualification or relegation
1	Fluminense	6	5	1	0	23	9	+14	11	Champions
2	Botafogo	6	4	0	2	7	5	+2	8	
3	Flamengo	6	2	1	3	9	12	−3	5	
4	América	6	0	0	6	10	23	−13	0	

Updated to match(es) played on December 22, 1946. Source: RSSSF.com
Rules for classification: 1) points; 2) goal difference; 3) wins; 4) number of goals scored.

== Top Scores ==
Rank	Player	Club	Goals
1	Francisco Rodrigues	Fluminense	28
2	Ademir de Menezes	Fluminense	25
3	Heleno de Freitas	Botafogo	24
4	José Perácio	Flamengo	19
5	Simões	Fluminense	16
