= 1957 Torneio Rio-São Paulo =

Torneio Rio-São Paulo
- Season: 1957
- Champions: Fluminense (1st title)
- Matches played: 45
- Goals scored: 166 (3.69 per match)
- Top goalscorer: Waldo (Fluminense) – 13 goals
- Biggest home win: Fluminense 5–1 Palmeiras (4 May); Santos 5–1 Botafogo (11 May)

The 1957 Torneio Rio São Paulo was the 10th edition of the Torneio Rio-São Paulo. It was disputed between 24 April to 6 June.

== Participants ==
Team	City	Nº participations	Best result
America	Rio de Janeiro	7	6th (1951)
Botafogo	Rio de Janeiro	7	3rd (1955)
Corinthians	(São Paulo (state)) São Paulo	10	Champions: 1950, 1953, 1954
Flamengo	Rio de Janeiro	9	4th (1951, 1955)
Fluminense	Rio de Janeiro	9	Runners-up: 1954
Palmeiras	(São Paulo (state)) São Paulo	10	Champions: 1933, 1951
Portuguesa	(São Paulo (state)) São Paulo	10	Champions: 1952, 1955
Santos	(São Paulo (state)) Santos	7	5th (1952, 1955)
São Paulo	(São Paulo (state)) São Paulo	10	Runners-up: 1933
Vasco da Gama	Rio de Janeiro	10	Runners-up: 1950, 1952, 1953

== Format ==
The tournament were disputed in a single round-robin format, with the club with most points conquered being the champions.

== Tournament ==
Following is the summary of the 1957 Torneio Rio-São Paulo tournament:

Pos	Team	Pld	W	D	L	GF	GA	GD	Pts
1	Fluminense (C)	9	7	2	0	23	11	+12	16
2	Flamengo	9	5	1	3	19	11	+8	11 (Note: Tied in points)
3	Vasco da Gama	9	5	1	3	17	14	+3	11
4	(São Paulo (state)) Santos	9	4	2	3	22	16	+6	10
5	(São Paulo (state)) Portuguesa	9	4	1	4	21	21	0	9 (Note: Tied in points)
6	Botafogo	9	3	3	3	16	19	−3	9
7	(São Paulo (state)) São Paulo	9	3	2	4	14	12	+2	8
8	(São Paulo (state)) Palmeiras	9	1	4	4	14	22	−8	6 (Note: Tied in points)
9	(São Paulo (state)) Corinthians	9	1	4	4	10	20	−10	6
10	America	9	2	0	7	10	20	−10	4

Source: RSSSF
Rules for classification: 1) points; 2) wins; 3) goal difference; 4) goals for.
(C) Champions
