= 1960 Torneio Rio-São Paulo =

Torneio Rio-São Paulo
- Season: 1960
- Champions: Fluminense (2nd title)
- Matches played: 45
- Goals scored: 139 (3.09 per match)
- Top goalscorer: Quarentinha (Botafogo); Waldo (Fluminense) – 11 goals each
- Biggest home win: Fluminense 7–2 São Paulo (20 Mar)

The 1960 Torneio Rio São Paulo was the 13th edition of the Torneio Rio-São Paulo. It was disputed between 10 March to 24 April.

== Participants ==
Team	City	Nº participations	Best result
America	Rio de Janeiro	10	6th (1951)
Botafogo	Rio de Janeiro	10	3rd (1955)
Corinthians	(São Paulo (state)) São Paulo	13	Champions: 1950, 1953, 1954
Flamengo	Rio de Janeiro	12	Runners-up: 1957, 1958
Fluminense	Rio de Janeiro	12	Champions: 1957
Palmeiras	(São Paulo (state)) São Paulo	13	Champions: 1933, 1951
Portuguesa	(São Paulo (state)) São Paulo	13	Champions: 1952, 1955
Santos	(São Paulo (state)) Santos	10	Champions: 1959
São Paulo	(São Paulo (state)) São Paulo	13	Runners-up: 1933
Vasco da Gama	Rio de Janeiro	13	Champions: 1958

== Format ==
The tournament were disputed in a single round-robin format, with the club with most points conquered being the champions.

== Tournament ==
Following is the summary of the 1960 Torneio Rio-São Paulo tournament:

Pos	Team	Pld	W	D	L	GF	GA	GD	Pts
1	Fluminense (C)	9	6	2	1	22	12	+10	14
2	Botafogo	9	4	4	1	17	12	+5	12
3	Vasco da Gama	9	4	3	2	17	7	+10	11 (Note: Tied in points)
4	(São Paulo (state)) Corinthians	9	4	3	2	11	10	+1	11
5	Flamengo	9	5	1	3	13	14	−1	11
6	(São Paulo (state)) Palmeiras	9	4	1	4	12	11	+1	9
7	(São Paulo (state)) São Paulo	9	2	3	4	11	19	−8	7
8	(São Paulo (state)) Santos	9	1	4	4	11	17	−6	6
9	(São Paulo (state)) Portuguesa	9	2	1	6	11	16	−5	5
10	America	9	1	2	6	14	21	−7	4

Source: RSSSF
Rules for classification: 1) points; 2) goal difference; 3) wins; 4) goals for.
(C) Champions
