= Waldo (footballer) =

Brazilian footballer (1934–2019)

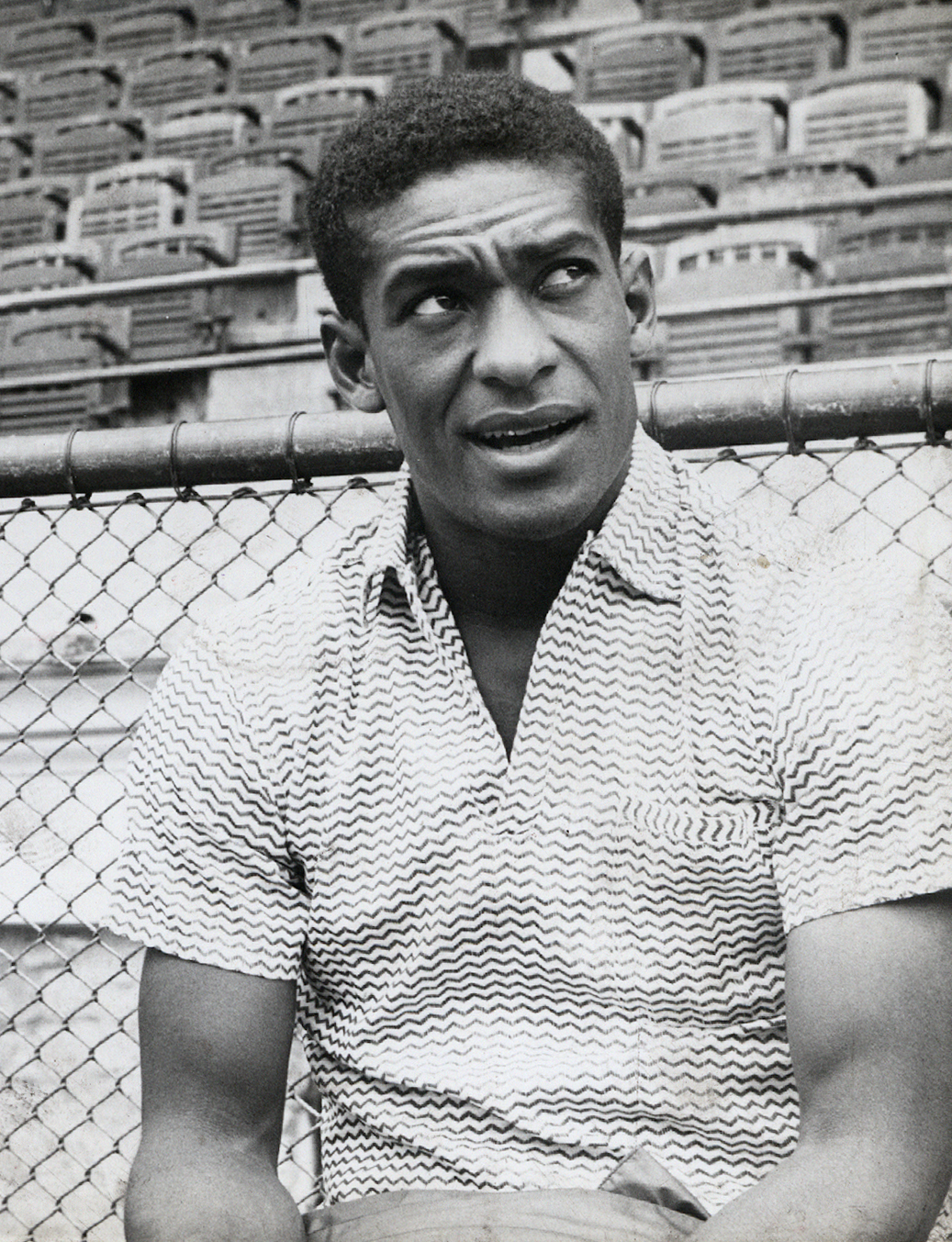
- Waldo in 1960

Personal information
- Full name: Waldo Machado da Silva
- Date of birth: 9 September 1934
- Place of birth: Niterói, Brazil
- Date of death: 25 February 2019 (aged 84)
- Place of death: Burjassot, Spain
- Height: 1.78 m (5 ft 10 in)
- Position: Forward

Youth career
- Madureira

Senior career*
Years	Team	Apps	(Gls)
1953–1954	Madureira	?	(22)
1954–1961	Fluminense	403	(319)
1961–1970	Valencia	216	(115)
1970–1971	Hércules	19	(1)
Total		638+	(457)

International career
1960	Brazil	5	(2)

Managerial career
- 1989: Alzira (interim)
- 1990: Alzira
- * Club domestic league appearances and goals

Waldo Machado da Silva (9 September 1934 – 25 February 2019), known simply as Waldo, was a Brazilian footballer who played as a forward.

He was best known for his time at Fluminense, where he was the top scorer in the club's history with 319 goals in 403 matches, and Valencia.

== Club career ==
Waldo was born in Niterói, Rio de Janeiro. After joining Madureira Esporte Clube's youth setup in the early 1950s, he made his debut as a senior in 1953.

On 11 April 1954, Waldo signed for Fluminense FC, and was the top scorer of all tournaments which his team won. In the 1957 edition of the Torneio Rio – São Paulo, he was one of the most important players as Flu were crowned champions without losing a game.

Waldo left Fluminense on 1 July 1961 with a record of 319 goals in only 403 matches, the club's all-time scorer. He immediately moved to La Liga's Valencia CF, signing as a replacement for his compatriot Walter Marciano who had just died at the age of 29 in a car accident after a friendly between the two sides.

Waldo made his debut in the Spanish top division on 3 September 1961, in a 3–0 away loss against Real Zaragoza. He scored his first two goals for the club six days later, in a 3–0 home win over Real Oviedo.

On 19 November 1961, Waldo scored four times in a 6–2 home rout of FC Barcelona, and finished his first season abroad with 14 goals from 30 appearances. On 12 June 1963, he equalised as Valencia came from behind to win 2–1 at GNK Dinamo Zagreb in the first leg of the Fairs Cup final (4–1 on aggregate).

Waldo netted a career-best 24 league goals in the 1966–67 campaign, and started in the 2–1 Spanish Cup final victory against Athletic Bilbao on 2 July 1967. He represented the Che until 1970, scoring 157 goals in 294 competitive matches.

In summer 1970, Waldo joined Valencian Community neighbours Hércules CF. He retired after one season in the Segunda División, aged 36.

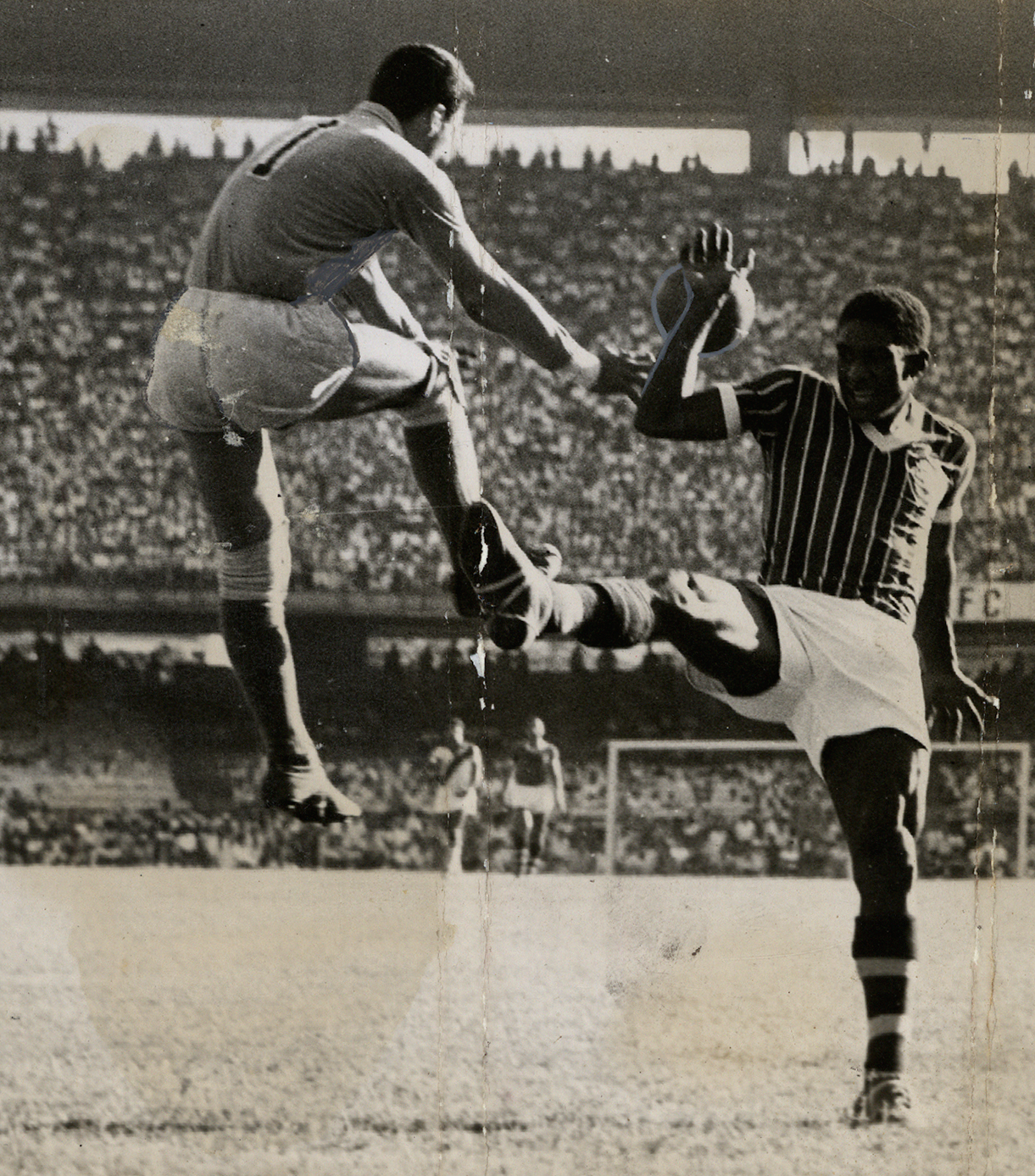
Waldo (right) at Maracanã Stadium

== International career ==
Waldo earned five caps for Brazil and scored two goals, being a part of the squad that won the 1960 Taça do Atlântico.

== Personal life and death ==
Waldo's younger brother, Wanderley, was also a footballer and a forward. He spent most of his career with Levante UD and CD Málaga, and the pair were teammates at Hércules.

On 25 February 2019, after five years battling with Alzheimer's disease, Waldo died in Burjassot at the age of 84. Wanderley also died of the same disease a year later.

== Career statistics ==
Scores and results list Brazil's goal tally first, score column indicates score after each Waldo goal.

List of international goals scored by Waldo
No.	Date	Venue	Opponent	Score	Result	Competition
1	29 June 1960	Maracanã, Rio de Janeiro, Brazil	Chile	3–0	4–0	Superclásico de las Américas
2	29 June 1960	Maracanã, Rio de Janeiro, Brazil	Chile	4–0	4–0	Superclásico de las Américas

== Honours ==
Fluminense

- Campeonato Carioca: 1959
- Torneio Rio-São Paulo: 1957, 1960

Valencia

- Inter-Cities Fairs Cup: 1961–62, 1962–63
- Copa del Generalísimo: 1966–67

Brazil

- Taça do Atlântico: 1960

Individual

- Pichichi Trophy: 1966–67
