= Quincas (footballer) =

Brazilian footballer (1931–2000)

Joaquim Albino
Personal information
- Full name: Joaquim Albino
- Date of birth: 23 January 1931
- Place of birth: Rio de Janeiro, Brazil
- Date of death: 5 September 2000 (aged 69)
- Position: Left winger

Senior career*
| Years | Team | Apps | (Gls) |
| 1950–1956 | Fluminense FC | 167 | (59) |
| 1957 | SE Palmeiras | 19 | (5) |
- * Club domestic league appearances and goals

Joaquim Albino (23 January 1931 – 5 September 2000), known as Quincas, was a Brazilian association football player who played on the left wing. In the first half of the 1950s he played for Fluminense FC of Rio de Janeiro, with which he won the Championship of Rio de Janeiro of 1951 and the Copa Rio, a highly regarded international tournament in its day, of 1952. Albino died on 5 September 2000, at the age of 69.

Clubs

- 1948-49: Canto do Rio FC
- 1950-56: Fluminense FC (167 matches / 59 goals)
- 1957: SE Palmeiras (19 matches / 5 goals)

Honours

- Championship of Rio de Janeiro: 1951
- Copa Rio: 1952
- top scorer of the Taça da Prefeitura do Distrito Federal of 1951 with 8 goals.

== Sources ==
- Qincas , Estatísticas Fluminense.
- Wagner Luiz Marques: Sociedade Esportiva Palmeiras: o time do todos os tempos, Cianorte, Paraná, 2012, p. 355.
