= 1951 Campeonato Carioca =

Campeonato Carioca
- Season: 1951
- Champions: Fluminense
- Matches played: 112
- Goals scored: 399 (3.56 per match)
- Top goalscorer: Carlyle (Fluminense) – 23 goals
- Biggest home win: Bonsucesso 5-0 Canto do Rio (December 9, 1951)
- Biggest away win: Canto do Rio 3-11 Bangu (December 30, 1951)
- Highest scoring: Canto do Rio 3-11 Bangu (December 30, 1951)

The 1951 edition of the Campeonato Carioca kicked off on August 4, 1951 and ended on January 20, 1952. It was organized by FMF (Federação Metropolitana de Futebol, or Metropolitan Football Federation). Eleven teams participated. Fluminense won the title for the 16th time. No teams were relegated.

== System ==
The tournament would be disputed in a double round-robin format, with the team with the most points winning the title.

== Torneio Municipal ==
Pos	Team	Pld	W	D	L	GF	GA	GD	Pts	Qualification or relegation
1	Botafogo	10	7	2	1	22	9	+13	16	Champions
2	Bangu	10	7	1	2	30	18	+12	15	
3	São Cristóvão	10	7	1	2	22	10	+12	15	
4	Fluminense	10	6	2	2	23	11	+12	14	
5	Vasco da Gama	10	5	1	4	28	20	+8	11	
6	Canto do Rio	10	4	2	4	17	17	0	10	
7	Flamengo	10	3	3	4	11	15	−4	9	
8	Olaria	10	4	0	6	21	15	+6	8	
9	Bonsucesso	10	2	2	6	9	24	−15	6	
10	América	10	1	2	7	11	25	−14	4	
11	Madureira	10	0	2	8	11	41	−30	2	

Updated to match(es) played on June 23, 1951. Source: RSSSF.com
Rules for classification: 1) points; 2) goal difference; 3) wins; 4) number of goals scored.

== Championship ==
Pos	Team	Pld	W	D	L	GF	GA	GD	Pts	Qualification or relegation
1	Fluminense	20	14	3	3	51	22	+29	31	Playoffs
2	Bangu	20	14	3	3	57	28	+29	31	Playoffs
3	Botafogo	20	13	4	3	41	19	+22	30	
4	Flamengo	20	11	3	6	39	21	+18	25	
5	Vasco da Gama	20	9	4	7	36	29	+7	22	
6	América	20	7	4	9	33	38	−5	18	
7	Olaria	20	6	5	9	34	44	−10	17	
8	São Cristóvão	20	6	4	10	25	38	−13	16	
9	Bonsucesso	20	3	8	9	36	48	−12	14	
10	Madureira	20	3	6	11	24	44	−20	12	
11	Canto do Rio	20	0	4	16	20	65	−45	4	

Updated to match(es) played on January 6, 1952. Source: RSSSF.com
Rules for classification: 1) points; 2) goal difference; 3) wins; 4) number of goals scored.

=== Playoffs ===
13 January 1952 Final	Fluminense	1 – 0	Bangu	Maracanã, Rio de Janeiro
	Orlando Pingo de Ouro 27'			Attendance: 60,196; Referee: Mário Vianna

20 January 1952 Final	Fluminense	2 – 0	Bangu	Maracanã, Rio de Janeiro
	Telê 19' 76'			Attendance: 78,849; Referee: Mário Vianna
