= 1959 Campeonato Carioca =

Campeonato Carioca
- Season: 1959
- Champions: Fluminense
- Taça Brasil: Fluminense
- Matches played: 132
- Goals scored: 417 (3.16 per match)
- Top goalscorer: Quarentinha (Botafogo) – 27 goals
- Biggest home win: Vasco da Gama 6-0 São Cristóvão (July 25, 1959); Botafogo 6-0 Bonsucesso (August 23, 1959)
- Biggest away win: Portuguesa 0-6 Flamengo (August 30, 1959)
- Highest scoring: Bangu 6-3 São Cristóvão (August 23, 1959)

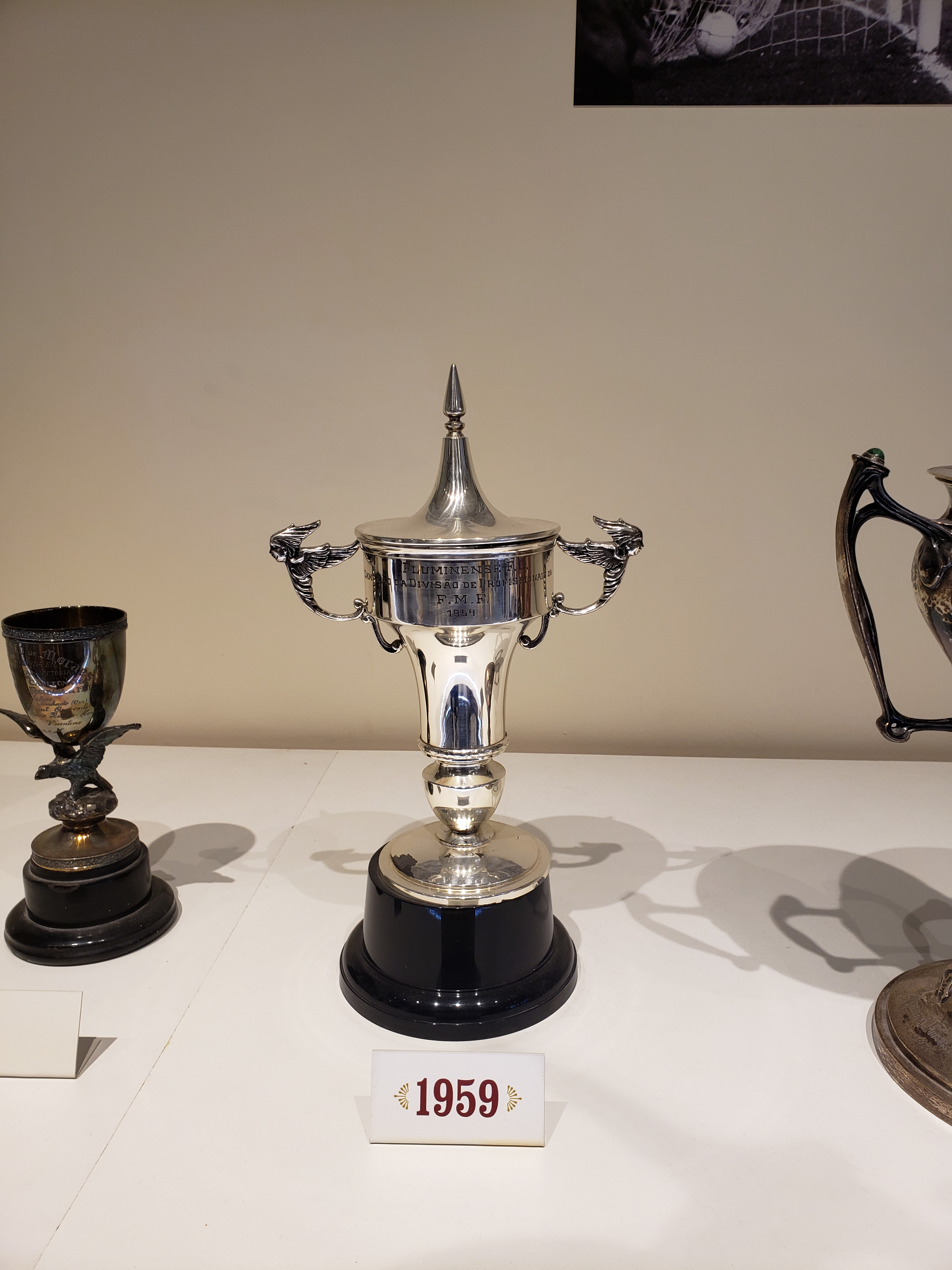
1959 Rio de Janeiro State Football Championship Cup

The 1959 edition of the Campeonato Carioca kicked off on July 12, 1959 and ended on December 20, 1959. It was organized by FMF (Federação Metropolitana de Futebol, or Metropolitan Football Federation). Twelve teams participated. Fluminense won the title for the 17th time. no teams were relegated.

== System ==
The tournament would be disputed in a double round-robin format, with the team with the most points winning the title.

== Championship ==
Pos	Team	Pld	W	D	L	GF	GA	GD	Pts	Qualification or relegation
1	Fluminense	22	17	4	1	45	9	+36	38	Champions
2	Botafogo	22	15	2	5	61	28	+33	32	
3	Bangu	22	13	6	3	39	20	+19	32	
4	Vasco da Gama	22	14	3	5	60	30	+30	31	
5	América	22	12	5	5	37	23	+14	29	
6	Flamengo	22	11	6	5	48	25	+23	28	
7	Madureira	22	7	4	11	25	40	−15	18	
8	Canto do Rio	22	4	5	13	20	37	−17	13	
9	Olaria	22	4	5	13	19	40	−21	13	
10	Bonsucesso	22	5	2	15	25	56	−31	12	
11	São Cristóvão	22	5	1	16	25	53	−28	11	
12	Portuguesa	22	3	1	18	13	56	−43	7	

Updated to match(es) played on December 20, 1959. Source: RSSSF.com
Rules for classification: 1) points; 2) goal difference; 3) wins; 4) number of goals scored.
