= Cláudio (footballer, born 1922) =

Brazilian footballer

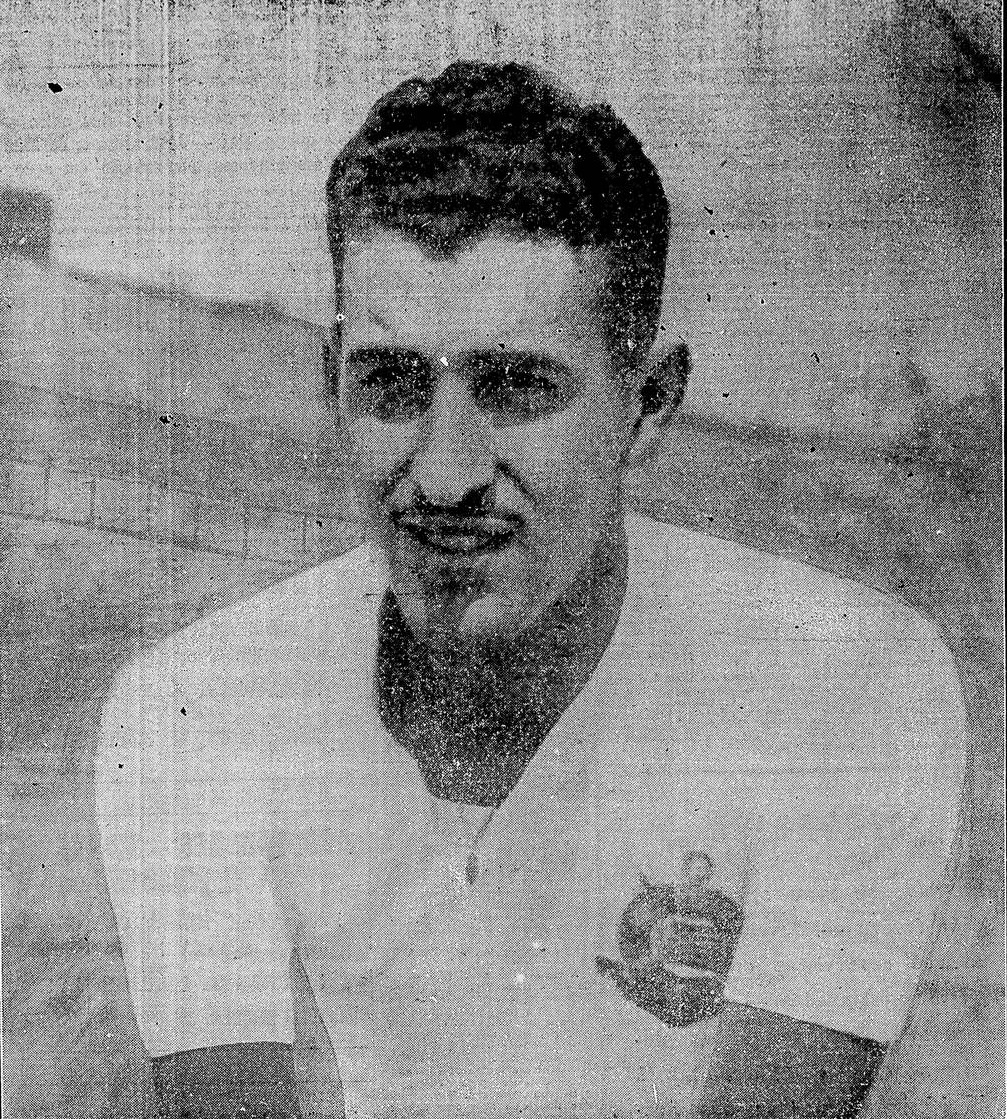

Personal information
- Full name: Cláudio Christóvam de Pinho
- Date of birth: July 18, 1922
- Place of birth: Santos, Brazil
- Date of death: May 1, 2000 (aged 77)
- Position: Attacking midfielder

Senior career*
Years	Team	Apps	(Gls)
1942–1944	Palmeiras	32	(9)
1944–1957	Corinthians	554	(306)
1958–1960	São Paulo FC	35	(10)

International career^{‡}
1942–1957	Brazil	31	(10)
- * Club domestic league appearances and goals as of 17:01, 19 March 2007 (UTC) ‡ National team caps and goals as of 17:01, 19 March 2007 (UTC)

Cláudio Christóvam de Pinho (July 18, 1922 – May 1, 2000), better known as Cláudio, was a former Brazilian footballer and the biggest scorer of all time for Corinthians. He has scored 306 goals in 554 games for the team, where he was nicknamed "Manager". He was also known for being a skillful player, who placed the ball anywhere he wanted, and is usually ranked as the 3rd best ever Corinthians player, after Rivellino and Sócrates.

== Biography ==
Born in Santos (SP), Cláudio began his career with the youth squad of his hometown's most famous club Santos Futebol Clube. After a few games, he moved for a short time to Sociedade Esportiva Palmeiras.

The “Manager”, along with Baltazar, Luizinho, Mário, Carbone, Simão, Rafael, Robert and many other great players, helped Corinthians to win important championships, among them the São Paulo State Championship in 1951, 1952 and 1954 and the Rio-São Paulo Tournament in 1950, 1953 and 1954.

But it was not just with the Corinthians that Cláudio achieved glory. He was a member of the Palmeiras team that won the São Paulo state championship in 1942 and he was also part of the Brazil national team which won the South American Cup in 1949.

== Honours ==
=== Club ===
Palmeiras

- Campeonato Paulista: 1942

Corinthians

- Torneio Rio–São Paulo: 1950, 1953, 1954
- Campeonato Paulista: 1951, 1952, 1954
- Small Club World Cup: 1953

=== International ===
- South American Championship: 1949

=== Individual ===
- Campeonato Paulista Team of the Tournament: 1946, 1950, 1951, 1952, 1954
- Campeonato Paulista Player of the Tournament: 1946, 1951
- Torneio Octogonal Rivadavia Correa Meyer Team of the Tournament: 1953
- Torneio Rio-São Paulo Team of the Tournament: 1954
