= Pinheiro (Brazilian footballer) =

Brazilian footballer

Personal information
- Full name: João Carlos Batista Pinheiro
- Date of birth: 13 January 1932
- Place of birth: Campos dos Goytacazes, Rio de Janeiro, Brazil
- Date of death: 30 August 2011 (aged 79)
- Place of death: Rio de Janeiro, Brazil
- Position: Defender

Senior career*
Years	Team	Apps	(Gls)
1947–1948	Americano		
1948–1963	Fluminense		
1963–1964	Bahia		

International career
1952–1955	Brazil	17	(1)

Managerial career
- 1971–1972: Fluminense
- 1977: Fluminense
- 1977: Americano
- 1979–1980: Náutico
- 1985: Goytacaz
- 1985: Bangu
- 1988: Botafogo
- 1989: America
- 1991–1992: América Mineiro
- 1993: Cruzeiro
- 1994: Fluminense
- * Club domestic league appearances and goals

João Carlos Batista Pinheiro, Pinheiro (January 13, 1932 in Campos dos Goytacazes – August 30, 2011), was a Brazilian footballer who achieved notoriety playing as a defender for Fluminense and the Brazil national football team. He was arguably the player with most appearances for Fluminense in the club's history, with 605 matches in total.

== Honours ==
- Fluminense
  - Campeonato Carioca: 1951, 1959
  - Copa Rio: 1952
  - Torneio Rio-São Paulo: 1957, 1960
- Brazil
  - Panamerican Championship: 1952
  - Bernardo O'Higgins Cup: 1955
