= Rodolfo Carbone =

Brazilian footballer

Personal information
- Date of birth: 1928
- Date of death: May 28, 2008 (aged 79–80)
- Position: Forward

Senior career*
Years	Team	Apps	(Gls)
1951-1957	Corinthians	231	(135)
- * Club domestic league appearances and goals

Rodolfo Carbone (1928 – May 25, 2008) was a Brazilian footballer who played as a forward.

He played for Corinthians in 231 games between 1951 and 1957, and scored 135 goals.

In 1951, the team composed of Carbone, Cláudio, Luisinho, Baltazar and Mário marked 103 goals in thirty matches of the São Paulo Championship, registering an average of 3.43 goals per game. Carbone was the top goal scorer of the competition with 30 goals.

== Books ==
Book Title	Publisher	Type	Year
Rodolfo Carbone	Plicpress	Biography	2012
