= 1953 South American Championship squads =

List of footballers

The following squads were named for the 1953 South American Championship that took place in Peru.

== Bolivia ==
Head Coach: (Italy) César Viccino

No.	Pos.	Player	Date of birth (age)	Caps	Goals	Club
—	FW	Ricardo Alcón		0	0	(Bolivian Football Federation) Unión Maestranza
—	FW	Víctor Brown	7 July 1927 (aged 25)	0	0	(Bolivian Football Federation) Club Litoral
—	DF	José Bustamante	5 March 1921 (aged 31)	19	0	(Bolivian Football Federation) Club Litoral
—	MF	René Cabrera	21 October 1925 (aged 27)	6	0	(Bolivian Football Federation) Jorge Wilstermann
—	FW	Delfín Díaz		0	0	(Bolivian Football Federation) Bolívar
—	DF	Eduardo González		0	0	(Bolivian Football Federation) CD Ingavi
—	FW	Benigno Gutiérrez	1 September 1925 (aged 27)	13	5	(Bolivian Football Federation) Club Litoral
—	GK	Eduardo Gutiérrez	17 January 1925 (aged 28)	10	0	(Bolivian Football Federation) CD Ingavi
—	FW	Hilarion López		0	0	(Bolivian Football Federation) CD Ingavi
—	FW	Mario Mena	28 July 1928 (aged 24)	7	0	(Bolivian Football Federation) Bolívar
—	MF	Arturo Miranda		0	0	(Bolivian Football Federation) Always Ready
—	DF	Javier Palazuelos		0	0	(Bolivian Football Federation)
—	MF	Máximo Ramírez	9 June 1933 (aged 19)	0	0	(Bolivian Football Federation) Club Ferroviario
—	GK	Raúl Reinoso		0	0	(Bolivian Football Federation)
—	FW	Ricardo Sánchez		0	0	(Bolivian Football Federation)
—	MF	Ramón Santos	17 March 1927 (aged 25)	0	0	(Bolivian Football Federation) Bolívar
—	FW	Víctor Ugarte	5 May 1926 (aged 26)	14	5	(Bolivian Football Federation) Bolívar
—	MF	Antonio Valencia	10 May 1925 (aged 27)	8	0	(Bolivian Football Federation) Bolívar
—	MF	Edgar Vargas	10 August 1929 (aged 23)	0	0	(Bolivian Football Federation) Bolívar

== Brazil ==
Head Coach: (Brazil) Zezé Moreira

No.	Pos.	Player	Date of birth (age)	Caps	Goals	Club
—	FW	Ademir	8 November 1922 (aged 30)	36	31	(Brazilian Football Confederation) Vasco da Gama
—	MF	Alfredo	1 January 1920 (aged 33)	4	1	(Brazilian Football Confederation) Vasco da Gama
—	FW	Baltazar	14 January 1926 (aged 27)	11	6	(Brazilian Football Confederation) Corinthians
—	MF	Bauer	21 November 1925 (aged 27)	14	0	(Brazilian Football Confederation) São Paulo
—	GK	Barbosa	27 March 1921 (aged 31)	19	0	(Brazilian Football Confederation) Vasco da Gama
—	DF	Brandãozinho	9 June 1925 (aged 27)	5	0	(Brazilian Football Confederation) Portuguesa
—	GK	Carlos Castilho	27 November 1927 (aged 25)	7	0	(Brazilian Football Confederation) Fluminense
—	FW	Cláudio	18 July 1922 (aged 30)	8	4	(Brazilian Football Confederation) Corinthians
—	MF	Danilo Alvim	3 December 1920 (aged 32)	20	2	(Brazilian Football Confederation) Vasco da Gama
—	FW	Didí	8 October 1928 (aged 24)	5	1	(Brazilian Football Confederation) Fluminense
—	DF	Djalma Santos	27 February 1929 (aged 23)	4	0	(Brazilian Football Confederation) Portuguesa
—	DF	Ely	14 May 1921 (aged 31)	13	0	(Brazilian Football Confederation) Vasco da Gama
—	GK	Gilmar	22 August 1930 (aged 22)	0	0	(Brazilian Football Confederation) Corinthians
—	DF	Haroldo	20 December 1931 (aged 21)	0	0	(Brazilian Football Confederation) Vasco da Gama
—	FW	Ipojucan	3 June 1926 (aged 26)	1	0	(Brazilian Football Confederation) Vasco da Gama
—	FW	Julinho Botelho	29 July 1929 (aged 23)	4	1	(Brazilian Football Confederation) Portuguesa
—	DF	Nílton Santos	16 May 1925 (aged 27)	10	0	(Brazilian Football Confederation) Botafogo
—	FW	Pinga	11 February 1924 (aged 28)	7	6	(Brazilian Football Confederation) Portuguesa
—	DF	Pinheiro	13 January 1932 (aged 21)	5	0	(Brazilian Football Confederation) Fluminense
—	FW	Rodrigues	27 June 1925 (aged 27)	7	3	(Brazilian Football Confederation) Palmeiras
—	FW	Zizinho	14 September 1921 (aged 31)	35	20	(Brazilian Football Confederation) Bangu

== Chile ==
Head Coach: (Chile) Luis Tirado

No.	Pos.	Player	Date of birth (age)	Caps	Goals	Club
—	DF	Manuel Álvarez	3 May 1928 (aged 24)	11	0	(Football Federation of Chile) Universidad Católica
—	MF	Augusto Arenas	15 March 1929 (aged 23)	0	0	(Football Federation of Chile) Everton
—	DF	Valentín Beperet	18 December 1926 (aged 26)	0	0	(Football Federation of Chile) Unión Española
—	DF	Óscar Carrasco	14 August 1928 (aged 24)	0	0	(Football Federation of Chile) Audax Italiano
—	MF	Ramiro Cortés	27 April 1931 (aged 21)	5	0	(Football Federation of Chile) Audax Italiano
—	FW	Atilio Cremaschi	8 March 1923 (aged 29)	17	9	(Football Federation of Chile) Unión Española
—	DF	Arturo Farías	1 September 1927 (aged 25)	11	0	(Football Federation of Chile) Colo-Colo
—	FW	Guillermo Díaz	29 December 1930 (aged 22)	5	2	(Football Federation of Chile) Santiago Morning
—	MF	Enrique Hormazábal	6 January 1931 (aged 22)	8	2	(Football Federation of Chile) Santiago Morning
—	FW	Fernando Hurtado	27 October 1927 (aged 25)	0	0	(Football Federation of Chile) Everton
—	GK	Sergio Livingstone	26 March 1920 (aged 32)	36	0	(Football Federation of Chile) Universidad Católica
—	FW	René Meléndez	29 December 1928 (aged 24)	6	2	(Football Federation of Chile) Everton
—	FW	Francisco Molina	29 March 1930 (aged 22)	0	0	(Football Federation of Chile) Universidad Católica
—	DF	Alfredo Olivos	28 May 1924 (aged 28)	0	0	(Football Federation of Chile) Audax Italiano
—	FW	Carlos Rojas	2 October 1928 (aged 24)	9	1	(Football Federation of Chile) Unión Española
—	DF	Fernando Roldán	24 July 1930 (aged 22)	9	2	(Football Federation of Chile) Universidad Católica
—	MF	Osvaldo Sáez	13 August 1923 (aged 29)	0	0	(Football Federation of Chile) Colo-Colo
—	MF	Carlos Tello	28 March 1928 (aged 24)	2	0	(Football Federation of Chile) Audax Italiano

== Ecuador ==
Head Coach: (Argentina) Gregorio Juan Esperón

No.	Pos.	Player	Date of birth (age)	Caps	Goals	Club
—	FW	Víctor Arteaga	30 April 1921 (aged 31)	6	1	(Ecuadorian Football Federation) Norte América
—	FW	José Vicente Balseca	19 August 1933 (aged 19)	0	0	(Ecuadorian Football Federation) Emelec
—	GK	Alfredo Bonnard	3 November 1930 (aged 22)	0	0	(Ecuadorian Football Federation) Valdez
—	FW	Sigifredo Chuchuca	16 March 1925 (aged 27)	5	1	(Ecuadorian Football Federation) Barcelona
—	FW	Raúl Pío de la Torre	5 May 1931 (aged 21)	0	0	(Ecuadorian Football Federation) Norte América
—	GK	Jorge Delgado	4 July 1931 (aged 21)	0	0	(Ecuadorian Football Federation) Barcelona
—	DF	Enrique Flores		0	0	(Ecuadorian Football Federation) Everest
—	FW	Eduardo Guzmán	21 January 1926 (aged 27)	0	0	(Ecuadorian Football Federation) Everest
—	DF	Jorge Henríquez	2 September 1921 (aged 31)	12	0	(Ecuadorian Football Federation) Emelec
—	DF	Jorge Izaguirre	23 January 1928 (aged 25)	0	0	(Ecuadorian Football Federation) 9 de Octubre
—	DF	Mario Lovato	21 June 1927 (aged 25)	2	0	(Ecuadorian Football Federation) Aucas
—	FW	Rafael Maldonado		6	1	(Ecuadorian Football Federation) Aucas
—	FW	Luis Marañón		0	0	(Ecuadorian Football Federation) Everest
—	MF	Heráclides Marín		9	0	(Ecuadorian Football Federation) Barcelona
—	MF	Daniel Pinto	15 July 1929 (aged 23)	0	0	(Ecuadorian Football Federation) Norte América
—	MF	Ricardo Riveros		10	0	(Ecuadorian Football Federation) Emelec
—	FW	Pablo Salazar		0	0	(Ecuadorian Football Federation) Barcelona
—	MF	Carlos Sánchez	15 July 1922 (aged 30)	9	0	(Ecuadorian Football Federation) Barcelona
—	MF	Galo Solís	5 June 1928 (aged 24)	0	0	(Ecuadorian Football Federation) Barcelona
—	MF	César Solórzano		0	0	(Ecuadorian Football Federation) Barcelona
—	FW	José Vargas	19 December 1924 (aged 28)	6	2	(Ecuadorian Football Federation) Barcelona
—	MF	Orlando Zambrano		0	0	(Ecuadorian Football Federation) Norte América

== Paraguay ==
Head Coach: (Paraguay) Manuel Fleitas Solich

No.	Pos.	Player	Date of birth (age)	Caps	Goals	Club
—	MF	Alejandro Arce		0	0	(Paraguayan Football Association) Cerro Porteño
—	FW	Milner Ayala	3 September 1928 (aged 24)	0	0	(Paraguayan Football Association) River Plate
—	FW	Ángel Berni	9 January 1931 (aged 22)	0	0	(Argentine Football Association) San Lorenzo
—	DF	Antonio Cabrera	21 October 1925 (aged 27)	1	0	(Paraguayan Football Association) Libertad
—	FW	Rubén Fernández	2 May 1931 (aged 21)	0	0	(Paraguayan Football Association) Libertad
—	DF	Manuel Gavilán	30 November 1920 (aged 32)	15	0	(Paraguayan Football Association) Libertad
—	FW	Antonio Ramón Gómez	4 May 1928 (aged 24)	0	0	(Paraguayan Football Association) Libertad
—	FW	Inocencio González	28 December 1929 (aged 23)	0	0	(Paraguayan Football Association) Sportivo Luqueño
—	MF	Ireneo Hermosilla	31 January 1928 (aged 25)	0	0	(Paraguayan Football Association) Libertad
—	DF	Heriberto Herrera	24 March 1926 (aged 26)	0	0	(Paraguayan Football Association) Club Nacional
—	FW	Luis Lacasa	0 December 1928 (aged 24–25)	0	0	(Paraguayan Football Association) Club Nacional
—	MF	Victoriano Leguizamón	22 March 1922 (aged 30)	2	0	(Paraguayan Football Association) Olimpia
—	FW	Pablo León		0	0	(Paraguayan Football Association) Guaraní
—	FW	Atilio López	5 February 1925 (aged 27)	2	1	(Peruvian Football Federation) Atlético Chalaco
—	DF	Robustiano Maciel	24 May 1930 (aged 22)	0	0	(Paraguayan Football Association) Libertad
—	DF	Domingo Martínez		0	0	(Paraguayan Football Association) Libertad
—	MF	Derlis Molinas		0	0	(Paraguayan Football Association) Club Nacional
—	GK	Rubén Noceda	11 May 1931 (aged 21)	0	0	(Paraguayan Football Association) Presidente Hayes
—	DF	Melanio Olmedo	19 January 1932 (aged 21)	0	0	(Paraguayan Football Association) Sol de América
—	FW	Silvio Parodi	6 November 1931 (aged 21)	0	0	(Paraguayan Football Association) Sportivo Luqueño
—	GK	Carlos Adolfo Riquelme	10 November 1928 (aged 24)	0	0	(Paraguayan Football Association) Club Nacional
—	FW	Juan Angel Romero	27 December 1934 (aged 18)	0	0	(Paraguayan Football Association) Olimpia

== Peru ==
Head Coach: (Northern Ireland) Billy Cook and (Argentina) Ángel Fernández Roca

No.	Pos.	Player	Date of birth (age)	Caps	Goals	Club
—	DF	José Allen		0	0	(Peruvian Football Federation) Alianza Lima
—	GK	Rafael Asca	28 October 1924 (aged 28)	1	0	(Peruvian Football Federation) Sporting Tabaco
—	FW	Guillermo Barbadillo	9 January 1925 (aged 28)	7	3	(Peruvian Football Federation) Sport Boys
—	FW	Juan Bassa	26 December 1932 (aged 20)	0	0	(Peruvian Football Federation) Mariscal Sucre
—	DF	César Brush	4 April 1930 (aged 22)	3	0	(Peruvian Football Federation) Deportivo Municipal
—	MF	Luis Calderón	17 June 1929 (aged 23)	6	0	(Peruvian Football Federation) Sport Boys
—	FW	Roberto Castillo	29 April 1930 (aged 22)	4	0	(Peruvian Football Federation) Alianza Lima
—	DF	Guillermo Delgado	11 February 1931 (aged 21)	5	0	(Peruvian Football Federation) Alianza Lima
—	MF	Roberto Drago	28 July 1923 (aged 29)	10	4	(Peruvian Football Federation) Deportivo Municipal
—	FW	Óscar Gómez Sánchez	31 October 1935 (aged 17)	0	0	(Peruvian Football Federation) Alianza Lima
—	MF	Rafael Goyeneche		3	0	(Peruvian Football Federation) Alianza Lima
—	MF	Cornelio Heredia	16 October 1920 (aged 32)	15	1	(Peruvian Football Federation) Alianza Lima
—	FW	Luis Navarrete	22 January 1928 (aged 25)	0	0	(Peruvian Football Federation) Deportivo Municipal
—	FW	Armando Reyes		0	0	(Peruvian Football Federation) Ciclista Lima
—	FW	Manuel Rivera	15 May 1922 (aged 30)	2	1	(Peruvian Football Federation) Deportivo Municipal
—	FW	Alberto Terry	16 May 1929 (aged 23)	0	0	(Peruvian Football Federation) Universitario de Deportes
—	DF	Gilberto Torres	15 August 1928 (aged 24)	3	1	(Peruvian Football Federation) Universitario de Deportes
—	MF	Ernesto Villamares		0	0	(Peruvian Football Federation) Sporting Tabaco

== Uruguay ==
Head Coach: (Uruguay) Romeo Vázquez

No.	Pos.	Player	Date of birth (age)	Caps	Goals	Club
—	FW	Osvaldo Balseiro	8 August 1928 (aged 24)	2	0	(Uruguayan Football Association) Defensor Sporting
—	FW	Raúl Bentancor	11 January 1930 (aged 23)	0	0	(Uruguayan Football Association) Danubio
—	DF	Néstor Carballo	3 February 1929 (aged 23)	0	0	(Uruguayan Football Association) Nacional
—	MF	Humberto Cardozo	21 November 1925 (aged 27)	0	0	(Uruguayan Football Association) Cerro
—	MF	Carlos María Carranza	30 November 1928 (aged 24)	0	0	(Uruguayan Football Association) Cerro
—	DF	Luis Alberto Cruz	28 April 1925 (aged 27)	0	0	(Uruguayan Football Association) Nacional
—	DF	Matías González	6 August 1925 (aged 27)	14	0	(Uruguayan Football Association) Cerro
—	DF	William Ruben Martínez	13 January 1928 (aged 25)	0	0	(Uruguayan Football Association) Rampla Juniors
—	FW	Omar Pedro Méndez	7 August 1934 (aged 18)	0	0	(Uruguayan Football Association) Central Español
—	FW	Rubén Morán	6 August 1930 (aged 22)	1	0	(Uruguayan Football Association) Cerro
—	FW	Walter Morel	30 June 1927 (aged 25)	0	0	(Uruguayan Football Association) River Plate
—	FW	Donald Peláez		0	0	(Uruguayan Football Association) Rampla Juniors
—	FW	Washington Puente		3	2	(Uruguayan Football Association) Rampla Juniors
—	MF	Julio Quiroga	13 August 1928 (aged 24)	0	0	(Uruguayan Football Association) Liverpool
—	GK	Luis Radiche	8 October 1927 (aged 25)	1	0	(Uruguayan Football Association) River Plate
—	MF	Urbano Rivera	1 April 1926 (aged 26)	0	0	(Uruguayan Football Association) Danubio
—	DF	Domingo Rodríguez		0	0	(Uruguayan Football Association) River Plate
—	GK	Pedro Rodríguez	19 June 1928 (aged 24)	0	0	(Uruguayan Football Association) Rampla Juniors
—	FW	Carlos Romero	17 September 1927 (aged 25)	4	1	(Uruguayan Football Association) Danubio
—	MF	Hosiriz Romero		7	0	(Uruguayan Football Association) Liverpool
—	FW	Rafael Souto	24 October 1930 (aged 22)	0	0	(Uruguayan Football Association) Nacional
—	FW	Rubén Vanoli		1	0	(Uruguayan Football Association) River Plate
