= 1953 South American Championship play-off =

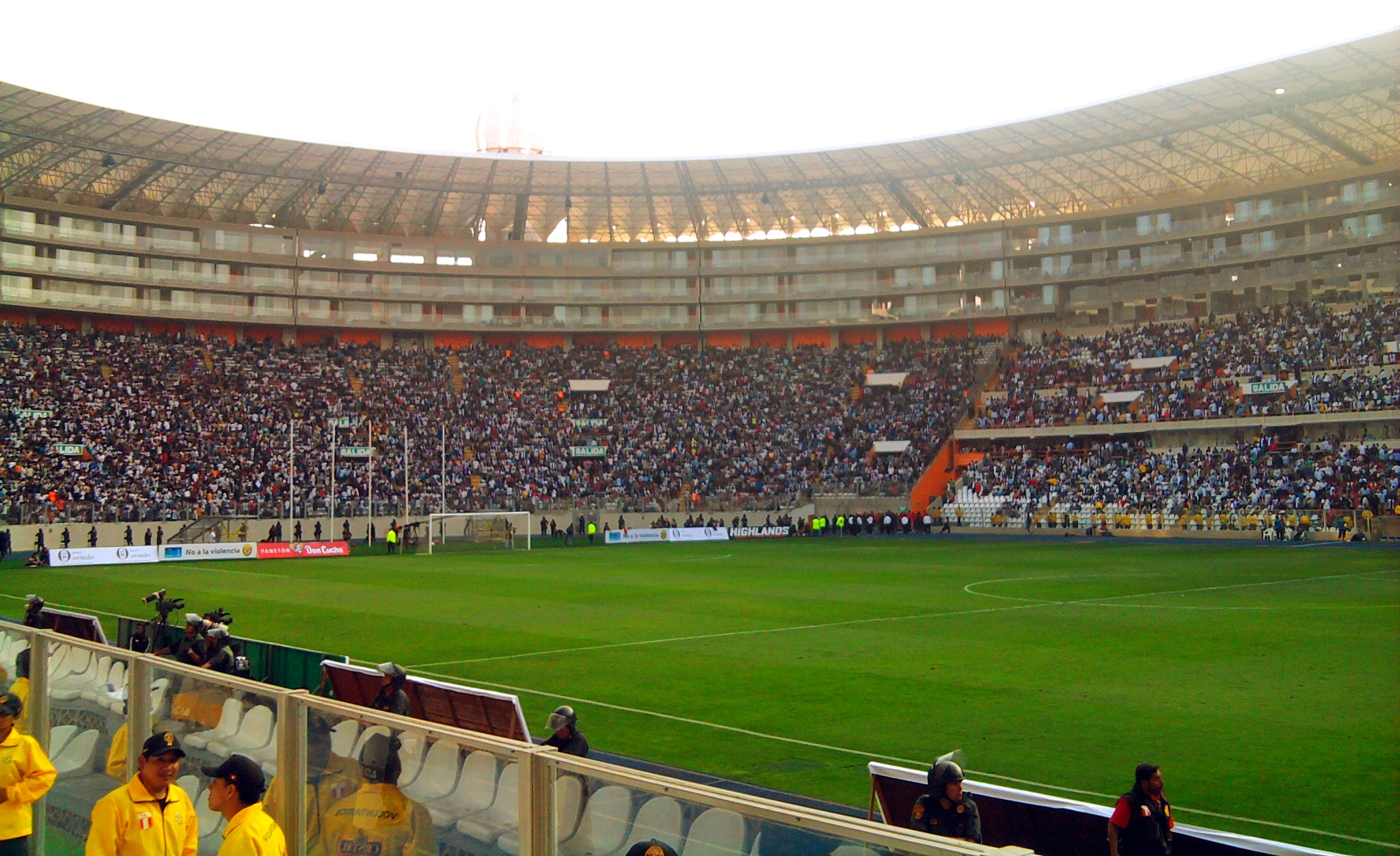
- Estadio Nacional de Lima, venue
- Event: 1953 South American Championship
Paraguay	Brazil
3	2
- Date: April 1, 1953
- Venue: Estadio Nacional, Lima
- Referee: Charles Dean (England)
- Attendance: 35,000

The 1953 South American Championship play-off was a match held to determine the winner of the 1953 South American Championship, as Paraguay and Brazil were tied for the first place after the regular competition. The match took place on April 1, 1953, at Estadio Nacional in Lima, Peru.

Paraguay won the match 3–2, winning its first continental title.

== Overview ==
Some journalists stated that Paraguay's best moments in football were during those years. In fact, the Paraguayan side achieved some notable results such as the 5–1 win over Argentina (then South American champion) in July 1945.

Other good performances by the Paraguayan team had been the 3rd place in 1946 –with goalkeeper Sinforiano García (considered one of the greatest in Paraguayan football) being the most notable player–, the 2nd place in 1947 and the win over Brazil on group stage in 1949 (although the host country would thrash Paraguay 7–0 in the play-off).

After former player Manuel Fleitas Solich was appointed coach, Paraguay started a hard training routine with the purpose of being in the best shape for the 1953 South American tournament. Results were highly satisfactory so Paraguay were crowned champion unbeaten (except for a walkover), beating Brazil in the play-off and taking revenge after losing to them in the 1949 play-off.

== Background ==
Paraguay
Round
Brazil
Opponent
Result
Group stage
Opponent
Result
Chile
3–0
Match 1
Bolivia
8–1
Ecuador
0–0
Match 2
Ecuador
2–0
Peru
2–2
Match 3
Uruguay
1–0
Uruguay
2–2
Match 4
Peru
0–1
Bolivia
2–1
Match 5
Chile
3–2
Brazil
2–1
Match 6
Paraguay
1–2
Final standings

Team	Pld	W	D	L	GF	GA	GD	Pts
Brazil	6	4	0	2	15	6	+9	8
Paraguay	6	3	2	1	11	6	+5	8
Uruguay	6	3	1	2	15	6	+9	7
Chile	6	3	1	2	10	10	0	7
Peru	6	3	1	2	4	6	−2	7
Bolivia	6	1	1	4	6	15	−9	3
Ecuador	6	0	2	4	1	13	−12	2

Note

Brazil and Paraguay finished tied on points so a playoff match had to be played to decide the champion.

== Match details ==
April 1, 1953

Paraguay	3–2	Brazil
Atilio López 14'; Gavilán 17'; Fernández 41'		Baltazar 56', 65'

Estadio Nacional, Lima
Attendance: 35,000
Referee: Charles Dean (England)

Paraguay	Brazil

GK	Adolfo Riquelme
RB	Heriberto Herrera
LB	Melanio Olmedo
RH	Manuel Gavilán
CH	Victoriano Leguizamón
LH	Ireneo Hermosilla
OR	Ángel Berni
IR	Atilio López	Substituted off
CF	Rubén Fernández
IL	Juan Ángel Romero	Substituted off
OL	Antonio R. Gómez	Substituted off
Substitutions:
MF	Silvio Parodi	Substituted on
MF	Luis Lacasa	Substituted on
MF	Inocencio González	Substituted on
Manager:
Manuel Fleitas Solich

GK	Castilho
RB	Djalma Santos
CB	Haroldo
LB	Nílton Santos	Substituted off
RH	Bauer
LH	Brandãozinho
OR	Didi
IR	Julinho
CF	Baltazar
IL	Pinga	Substituted off
OL	Cláudio
Substitutions:
FW	Alfredo	Substituted on
FW	Ipojucã	Substituted on
Manager:
Zezé Moreira
