= 1949 South American Championship squads =

List of footballers

These are the squads for the countries that played in the 1949 South American Championship. The participating countries were Bolivia, Brazil, Chile, Colombia, Ecuador, Paraguay, Peru and Uruguay. Argentina withdrew from the tournament. The teams plays in a single round-robin tournament, earning two points for a win, one point for a draw, and zero points for a loss.

== Bolivia ==
Head Coach: (Bolivia) Félix Deheza

No.	Pos.	Player	Date of birth (age)	Caps	Goals	Club
—	DF	Alberto Achá	3 April 1920 (aged 29)	16	0	(Bolivian Football Federation) The Strongest
—	FW	Víctor Celestino Algarañaz	6 April 1926 (aged 22)	0	0	(Bolivian Football Federation) Club Litoral
—	MF	Carlos Arias		0	0	(Bolivian Football Federation) Club Bolívar
—	GK	Vicente Arraya	25 January 1922 (aged 27)	16	0	(Bolivian Football Federation) The Strongest
—	DF	José Bustamante	5 March 1921 (aged 28)	11	0	(Bolivian Football Federation) Club Litoral
—	MF	René Cabrera	21 October 1925 (aged 23)	0	0	(Bolivian Football Federation) Jorge Wilstermann
—	DF	Armando Delgadillo		0	0	(Bolivian Football Federation)
—	MF	Leonardo Ferrel	7 July 1923 (aged 25)	4	0	(Bolivian Football Federation) The Strongest
—	FW	Benedicto Godoy	28 July 1924 (aged 24)	0	0	(Bolivian Football Federation) Club Ferroviario
—	FW	Benigno Gutiérrez	1 September 1925 (aged 23)	5	2	(Bolivian Football Federation) Club Litoral
—	GK	Eduardo Gutiérrez	17 January 1925 (aged 24)	4	0	(Bolivian Football Federation) CD Ingavi
—	FW	Benjamin Maldonado	4 January 1928 (aged 21)	3	0	(Bolivian Football Federation) Club San José
—	FW	Mario Mena	28 July 1928 (aged 20)	0	0	(Bolivian Football Federation) Club Bolívar
—	MF	Humberto Montaño		0	0	(Bolivian Football Federation) Club Bolívar
—	FW	Nemesio Rojas		0	0	(Bolivian Football Federation)
—	FW	Armando Tapia	22 January 1922 (aged 27)	13	1	(Bolivian Football Federation) Club Ferroviario
—	FW	Víctor Ugarte	5 May 1926 (aged 22)	6	0	(Bolivian Football Federation) Club Bolívar
—	MF	Antonio Valencia	10 May 1925 (aged 23)	0	0	(Bolivian Football Federation) Club Litoral

== Brazil ==
Head Coach: (Brazil) Flavio Costa

No.	Pos.	Player	Date of birth (age)	Caps	Goals	Club
—	FW	Ademir	8 November 1922 (aged 26)	17	8	(Brazilian Football Confederation) Vasco da Gama
—	DF	Augusto	22 October 1920 (aged 28)	4	0	(Brazilian Football Confederation) Vasco da Gama
—	GK	Barbosa	27 March 1921 (aged 28)	2	0	(Brazilian Football Confederation) Vasco da Gama
—	MF	José Carlos Bauer	21 November 1925 (aged 23)	0	0	(Brazilian Football Confederation) São Paulo
—	DF	Bigode	4 April 1922 (aged 26)	0	0	(Brazilian Football Confederation) Fluminense
—	FW	Canhotinho	15 July 1924 (aged 24)	2	1	(Brazilian Football Confederation) Palmeiras
—	FW	Cláudio Pinho	18 July 1922 (aged 26)	6	1	(Brazilian Football Confederation) Corinthians
—	MF	Danilo	3 December 1920 (aged 28)	7	1	(Brazilian Football Confederation) Vasco da Gama
—	MF	Ely	14 May 1921 (aged 27)	0	0	(Brazilian Football Confederation) Vasco da Gama
—	MF	Jair	21 March 1921 (aged 28)	22	11	(Brazilian Football Confederation) Flamengo
—	DF	Mauro Ramos	30 August 1930 (aged 18)	0	0	(Brazilian Football Confederation) São Paulo
—	DF	Nílton Santos	16 May 1925 (aged 23)	0	0	(Brazilian Football Confederation) Botafogo
—	FW	Nininho	6 November 1923 (aged 25)	0	0	(Brazilian Football Confederation) Portuguesa
—	DF	Noronha	25 November 1918 (aged 30)	6	0	(Brazilian Football Confederation) São Paulo
—	MF	Octávio Moraes	9 July 1923 (aged 25)	0	0	(Brazilian Football Confederation) Botafogo
—	FW	Orlando	4 December 1923 (aged 25)	0	0	(Brazilian Football Confederation) Fluminense
—	GK	Oswaldo Baliza	9 October 1923 (aged 25)	0	0	(Brazilian Football Confederation) Botafogo
—	DF	Rui Campos	2 February 1922 (aged 27)	21	2	(Brazilian Football Confederation) São Paulo
—	FW	Simão	16 March 1928 (aged 21)	0	0	(Brazilian Football Confederation) Portuguesa
—	FW	Tesourinha	3 December 1921 (aged 27)	15	3	(Brazilian Football Confederation) Internacional
—	DF	Wilson	21 December 1927 (aged 21)	0	0	(Brazilian Football Confederation) Vasco da Gama
—	MF	Zizinho	14 September 1921 (aged 27)	21	12	(Brazilian Football Confederation) Flamengo

== Chile ==
Head Coach: (Chile) Luis Tirado

No.	Pos.	Player	Date of birth (age)	Caps	Goals	Club
—	DF	Manuel Álvarez	23 May 1928 (aged 20)	2	0	(Football Federation of Chile) Universidad Católica
—	DF	Miguel Busquets	15 October 1920 (aged 28)	10	1	(Football Federation of Chile) Universidad de Chile
—	FW	Mario Castro	23 September 1923 (aged 25)	6	0	(Football Federation of Chile) Colo Colo
—	FW	Atilio Cremaschi	8 March 1923 (aged 26)	6	3	(Football Federation of Chile) Unión Española
—	DF	Miguel Flores	11 October 1920 (aged 28)	0	0	(Football Federation of Chile) Magallanes
—	FW	Francisco Hormazábal	4 July 1920 (aged 28)	4	1	(Football Federation of Chile) Green Cross
—	FW	Raimundo Infante	2 February 1928 (aged 21)	5	1	(Football Federation of Chile) Universidad Católica
—	GK	Sergio Livingstone	26 March 1920 (aged 29)	21	0	(Football Federation of Chile) Universidad Católica
—	FW	Luis López	1 January 1924 (aged 25)	0	0	(Football Federation of Chile) Magallanes
—	FW	Pedro Hugo López	25 October 1927 (aged 21)	7	3	(Football Federation of Chile) Universidad de Chile
—	DF	Manuel Machuca	31 May 1924 (aged 24)	7	0	(Football Federation of Chile) Colo Colo
—	MF	Gilberto Muñoz	23 January 1923 (aged 26)	0	0	(Football Federation of Chile) Colo Colo
—	DF	Juan Negri	5 January 1925 (aged 24)	6	0	(Football Federation of Chile) Universidad de Chile
—	FW	Andrés Prieto	19 December 1928 (aged 20)	4	1	(Football Federation of Chile) Universidad Católica
—	DF	Ulises Ramos	4 November 1919 (aged 29)	0	0	(Football Federation of Chile) Universidad de Chile
—	FW	Fernando Riera	27 June 1920 (aged 28)	10	2	(Football Federation of Chile) Universidad Católica
—	MF	Carlos Rojas	2 October 1928 (aged 20)	0	0	(Football Federation of Chile) Unión Española
—	FW	Manuel Salamanca	29 July 1927 (aged 21)	0	0	(Football Federation of Chile) Magallanes
—	DF	Francisco Urroz	14 December 1920 (aged 28)	5	0	(Football Federation of Chile) Colo Colo
—	FW	Carlos Varela	2 January 1918 (aged 31)	6	1	(Football Federation of Chile) Audax Italiano

== Colombia ==
Head Coach: (Austria) Friedrich Donnenfeld

No.	Pos.	Player	Date of birth (age)	Caps	Goals	Club
—	FW	Luis Apolinario		0	0	(Colombian Football Federation) Junior
—	FW	Fulgencio Berdugo	14 June 1918 (aged 30)	6	2	(Colombian Football Federation) Junior
—	FW	Octavio Carrillo		3	0	(Colombian Football Federation) Junior
—	MF	Luz Gastelbondo		0	0	(Colombian Football Federation) Junior
—	FW	Lancáster de León		3	0	(Colombian Football Federation) Junior
—	FW	Rigoberto García		5	0	(Colombian Football Federation) Junior
—	FW	Luis González Rubio		10	2	(Colombian Football Federation) Junior
—	MF	Casimiro Guerra		0	0	(Colombian Football Federation) Junior
—	MF	Emiliano Gutiérrez		0	0	(Colombian Football Federation) Junior
—	DF	Mario Marriaga		0	0	(Colombian Football Federation) Junior
—	DF	Gabriel Mejía		11	0	(Colombian Football Federation) Junior
—	MF	Guillermo Muñoz		0	0	(Colombian Football Federation) Junior
—	GK	Dagoberto Ojeda		0	0	(Colombian Football Federation) Junior
—	FW	Alfonso Pedraza		0	0	(Colombian Football Federation) Junior
—	FW	Alfredo Pérez		0	0	(Colombian Football Federation) Junior
—	FW	Nelson Pérez		0	0	(Colombian Football Federation) Junior
—	DF	Humberto Picalúa		10	0	(Colombian Football Federation) Junior
—	FW	Octavio Ruiz		4	0	(Colombian Football Federation) Junior
—	GK	Efraín Sánchez	26 February 1926 (aged 23)	7	0	(Argentine Football Association) San Lorenzo
—	FW	Arturo Ucrós		0	0	(Colombian Football Federation) Junior

== Ecuador ==
Head Coach: (Spain) José Planas

No.	Pos.	Player	Date of birth (age)	Caps	Goals	Club
—	DF	Bolívar Andrade		0	0	(Ecuadorian Football Federation) Barcelona SC
—	FW	Guido Andrade	8 July 1926 (aged 22)	0	0	(Ecuadorian Football Federation) Barcelona SC
—	FW	Víctor Arteaga	30 April 1921 (aged 27)	0	0	(Ecuadorian Football Federation) Norte América
—	DF	Marcos Bermeo		0	0	(Ecuadorian Football Federation) Aucas
—	FW	Enrique Cantos	18 January 1925 (aged 24)	3	0	(Ecuadorian Football Federation) Barcelona SC
—	MF	Jorge Cantos	17 May 1924 (aged 24)	0	0	(Ecuadorian Football Federation) Barcelona SC
—	GK	Luis Alfredo Carrillo	3 November 1920 (aged 28)	2	0	(Ecuadorian Football Federation) Macará
—	FW	Sigifredo Chuchuca	16 March 1925 (aged 24)	0	0	(Ecuadorian Football Federation) Barcelona SC
—	FW	César Garnica	22 November 1919 (aged 29)	5	1	(Ecuadorian Football Federation) Aucas
—	FW	José María Jiménez	22 July 1921 (aged 27)	13	4	(Ecuadorian Football Federation) Emelec
—	DF	Mario Lovato	21 June 1927 (aged 21)	0	0	(Ecuadorian Football Federation) Aucas
—	FW	Rafael Maldonado		0	0	(Ecuadorian Football Federation) Deportivo Quito
—	MF	Heráclides Marín		5	0	(Ecuadorian Football Federation) Barcelona SC
—	FW	Gonzalo Pozo	27 May 1925 (aged 23)	6	0	(Ecuadorian Football Federation) Aucas
—	MF	Ricardo Riveros		5	0	(Ecuadorian Football Federation) Emelec
—	MF	Hernán Salgado		0	0	(Ecuadorian Football Federation) LDU Quito
—	DF	Carlos Sánchez	15 July 1922 (aged 26)	2	0	(Ecuadorian Football Federation) Barcelona SC
—	FW	Marcos Spencer	4 October 1927 (aged 21)	0	0	(Ecuadorian Football Federation) Panamá
—	GK	Félix Torres	2 May 1922 (aged 26)	0	0	(Ecuadorian Football Federation) Barcelona SC
—	MF	Luis Torres		0	0	(Ecuadorian Football Federation) Aucas
—	FW	José Vargas	19 December 1924 (aged 24)	1	0	(Ecuadorian Football Federation) Barcelona SC
—	MF	Luis Vásquez		0	0	(Ecuadorian Football Federation) LDU Quito

== Paraguay ==
Head Coach: (Paraguay) Manuel Fleitas Solich

No.	Pos.	Player	Date of birth (age)	Caps	Goals	Club
—	FW	Dionisio Arce	14 June 1927 (aged 21)	0	0	(Paraguayan Football Association) Sportivo Luqueño
—	FW	Enrique Avalos	1922 (aged 27)	4	1	(Paraguayan Football Association) Cerro Porteño
—	FW	Marcial Barrios	26 June 1919 (aged 29)	9	5	(Paraguayan Football Association) Olimpia
—	FW	Jorge Duilio Benítez	23 April 1927 (aged 21)	0	0	(Paraguayan Football Association) Club Nacional
—	DF	Antonio Cabrera		0	0	(Paraguayan Football Association) Libertad
—	MF	Francisco Calonga		4	0	(Paraguayan Football Association) Olimpia
—	MF	Castor Cantero	12 January 1918 (aged 31)	9	0	(Paraguayan Football Association) Olimpia
—	DF	Casiano Céspedes	30 November 1923 (aged 25)	7	0	(Paraguayan Football Association) Olimpia
—	FW	Pedro Fernández		5	0	(Paraguayan Football Association) Cerro Porteño
—	GK	Sinforiano García	22 August 1924 (aged 24)	7	0	(Paraguayan Football Association) Cerro Porteño
—	MF	Manuel Gavilán	30 November 1920 (aged 28)	7	0	(Paraguayan Football Association) Libertad
—	DF	Alberto González	1922 (aged 27)	0	0	(Paraguayan Football Association) Olimpia
—	MF	Armando González	1924 (aged 25)	0	0	(Paraguayan Football Association) Guaraní
—	FW	César López Fretes	21 March 1923 (aged 26)	4	0	(Paraguayan Football Association) Olimpia
—	GK	Dionisio Maciel		0	0	(Paraguayan Football Association) Olimpia
—	MF	Pedro Nardelli	28 November 1926 (aged 22)	0	0	(Paraguayan Football Association) Sportivo Luqueño
—	MF	Rogelio Negri		0	0	(Paraguayan Football Association) Cerro Porteño
—	FW	Sixto Noceda		0	0	(Paraguayan Football Association) Presidente Hayes
—	FW	Santiago Rivas		7	0	(Paraguayan Football Association) Cerro Porteño
—	MF	Estanislao Romero		0	0	(Colombian Football Federation) Sporting Barranquilla
—	MF	César Santomé		0	0	(Paraguayan Football Association) Club Nacional
—	FW	Félix Vázquez		0	0	(Paraguayan Football Association) Guaraní

== Peru ==
Head Coach: (Peru) Arturo Fernández

No.	Pos.	Player	Date of birth (age)	Caps	Goals	Club
—	DF	Gerardo Arce	22 September 1917 (aged 31)	3	0	(Peruvian Football Federation) Alianza Lima
—	MF	Luis Calderón	17 June 1929 (aged 19)	0	0	(Peruvian Football Federation) Sport Boys
—	FW	Félix Castillo	21 February 1928 (aged 21)	5	1	(Peruvian Football Federation) Alianza Lima
—	MF	Germán Colunga	28 May 1922 (aged 26)	0	0	(Peruvian Football Federation) Deportivo Municipal
—	DF	Andrés da Silva	21 March 1921 (aged 28)	3	0	(Peruvian Football Federation) Universitario de Deportes
—	FW	Manuel Drago	14 November 1924 (aged 24)	0	0	(Peruvian Football Federation) Sport Boys
—	MF	Roberto Drago	28 July 1923 (aged 25)	0	0	(Peruvian Football Federation) Deportivo Municipal
—	DF	Félix Fuentes	25 April 1922 (aged 26)	0	0	(Peruvian Football Federation) Alianza Lima
—	FW	Carlos Gómez Sánchez	4 October 1923 (aged 25)	6	3	(Argentine Football Association) Boca Juniors
—	FW	Alejandro González	17 March 1915 (aged 34)	7	0	(Peruvian Football Federation) Alianza Lima
—	MF	Cornelio Heredia	16 October 1920 (aged 28)	6	0	(Peruvian Football Federation) Alianza Lima
—	MF	Dagoberto Lavalle	25 March 1925 (aged 24)	0	0	(Peruvian Football Federation) Sport Boys
—	FW	Leonidas Mendoza	1 April 1925 (aged 24)	0	0	(Peruvian Football Federation) Sporting Tabaco
—	FW	Ernesto Morales	17 May 1925 (aged 23)	1	0	(Peruvian Football Federation) Atlético Chalaco
—	FW	Alfredo Mosquera	15 February 1928 (aged 21)	0	0	(Peruvian Football Federation) Sporting Tabaco
—	GK	Walter Ormeño	3 December 1926 (aged 22)	0	0	(Peruvian Football Federation) Universitario de Deportes
—	MF	Lorenzo Pacheco	10 August 1919 (aged 29)	5	0	(Peruvian Football Federation) Sport Boys
—	FW	Víctor Pedraza		0	0	(Peruvian Football Federation) Alianza Lima
—	FW	Juan Emilio Salinas	12 July 1925 (aged 23)	0	0	(Peruvian Football Federation) Alianza Lima
—	FW	Pedro Valdivieso	19 October 1922 (aged 26)	0	0	(Peruvian Football Federation) Sport Boys

== Uruguay ==
Head Coach: (Uruguay) Oscar Marcenaro

No.	Pos.	Player	Date of birth (age)	Caps	Goals	Club
—	GK	Raúl Arizábalo		0	0	(Uruguayan Football Association) Defensor Sporting
—	DF	Alberto Avilés		0	0	(Uruguayan Football Association) Central Español
—	FW	Juan Ayala		0	0	(Uruguayan Football Association) Peñarol
—	FW	Ernesto Betancour		0	0	(Uruguayan Football Association) Peñarol
—	FW	Ramón Castro	20 February 1921 (aged 28)	3	0	(Uruguayan Football Association) Defensor Sporting
—	DF	Roberto Gadea		0	0	(Uruguayan Football Association) Miramar Misiones
—	FW	José María García		0	0	(Uruguayan Football Association) Montevideo Wanderers
—	MF	Roberto García		0	0	(Uruguayan Football Association) Montevideo Wanderers
—	MF	Simón García		0	0	(Uruguayan Football Association) Montevideo Wanderers
—	DF	Matías González	6 August 1925 (aged 23)	0	0	(Uruguayan Football Association) Cerro
—	GK	Jorge La Paz		0	0	(Uruguayan Football Association) Peñarol
—	FW	Miguel Martínez		0	0	(Uruguayan Football Association) Peñarol
—	MF	Dagoberto Moll	22 July 1927 (aged 21)	0	0	(Uruguayan Football Association) Miramar Misiones
—	FW	Nelson Moreno		0	0	(Uruguayan Football Association) Peñarol
—	DF	Dionisio Sosa		0	0	(Uruguayan Football Association) River Plate
—	FW	Esteban Suárez		0	0	(Uruguayan Football Association) Bella Vista
—	MF	Julio César Villarreal		0	0	(Uruguayan Football Association) Liverpool
