= Deaths in December 1998 =

The following is a list of notable deaths in December 1998.

Entries for each day are listed alphabetically by surname. A typical entry lists information in the following sequence:

- Name, age, country of citizenship at birth, subsequent country of citizenship (if applicable), reason for notability, cause of death (if known), and reference.

== December 1998 ==
=== 1 ===
- Aisha Abd al-Rahman, 85, Egyptian author and professor of literature, heart attack.
- Janet Lewis, 99, American novelist, poet, and librettist.
- Bertil Nordahl, 81, Swedish football player, manager, and Olympian (1948).
- Vincenzo Pappalettera, 79, Italian writer and historian.
- Donald Smith, 78, Australian operatic tenor.
- Freddie Young, 96, British cinematographer (Lawrence of Arabia, Doctor Zhivago, Ryan's Daughter), Oscar winner (1963, 1966, 1971).

=== 2 ===
- Theodora Mead Abel, 99, American clinical psychologist.
- Ben Guintini, 79, American baseball player (Pittsburgh Pirates, Philadelphia Athletics).
- Bob Haggart, 84, American dixieland jazz musician.
- Cleopa Ilie, 86, Romanian abbot.
- Mikio Oda, 93, Japanese athlete and the first Japanese Olympic gold medalist (1924, 1928, 1932).
- Red Roberts, 80, American baseball player (Washington Senators).
- Brian Stonehouse, 80, British painter and SEO agent during World War II.

=== 3 ===
- Pierre Hétu, 62, Canadian conductor, pianist and politician, cancer.
- Albert Leman, 83, Soviet composer of classical music.
- Mohammad Mokhtari, 56, Iranian writer, poet and activist, homicide.
- George Murcell, 73, British actor.
- Robert Rothschild, 86, Belgian diplomat.
- Ed Widseth, 88, American football player (New York Giants).

=== 4 ===
- Percy Ames, 66, English footballer.
- Egil Johansen, 64, Norwegian-Swedish jazz musician.
- Suzanne Jovin, 21, German-born American student, stabbed.
- Milton Marks, 78, American politician.
- Yury Vengerovsky, 60, Ukrainian volleyball player and Olympic champion (1964).

=== 5 ===
- Hazel Bishop, 92, American chemist.
- Jack Connor, 78, English footballer.
- Jean Fenwick, 91, Trinidad-American actress.
- Albert Arnold Gore, 90, American politician and father of Al Gore.
- John Lions, 61, Australian computer scientist.
- Henry McCall, 91, American baseball player.
- Joseph Roude, 71, French Olympic boxer (1948).
- Cheung Tze-keung, 43, Chinese criminal, execution by firing squad.

=== 6 ===
- César Baldaccini, 77, French sculptor.
- Georges Borgeaud, 84, Swiss writer and publisher.
- Robert Marasco, 62, American horror novelist and playwright, lung cancer.
- Pierre Mousel, 83, Luxembourgish Olympic football player (1936).
- Peg Leg Bates, 91, American entertainer.
- Radomir Šaper, 72, Yugoslav/Serbian basketball player and executive.
- Hoshiar Singh, 62, Indian Army officer.
- Michael Zaslow, 56, American actor, cancer.

=== 7 ===
- John Addison, 78, British composer.
- Carlos Oviedo Cavada, 71, Chilean cardinal of the Catholic Church.
- Daniel Lee Corwin, 40, American serial killer, execution by lethal injection.
- Bill Coven, 78, American basketball player (Rochester Royals).
- Voitto Hellstén, 66, Finnish sprinter and Olympic medalist (1952, 1956, 1960).
- Tim Kelly, 61, American playwright.
- Marthe Létourneau, 82, Canadian soprano and teacher.
- Vic Markov, 82, American football player (Washington Huskies, Cleveland Rams).
- Martin Rodbell, 73, American scientist and Nobel prize recipient, multiple organ failure.
- Jean Rouget, 82, French Olympic field hockey player (1936, 1948).
- George Wilson, 77, American comic book artist.

=== 8 ===
- Peg Leg Bates, 91, American entertainer.
- Michael Craze, 56, British actor (Doctor Who), heart attack.
- Hamilton Howze, 89, American general and commander of the 82nd Airborne Division.
- Jimmy Ingram, 70, American racing driver.
- George Roden, 60, American leader of the Branch Davidian sect, heart attack.

=== 9 ===
- Ralph Barkman, 91, American football player (Orange Tornadoes).
- Eric Bennett, 83, Australian rugby league footballer.
- Shaughnessy Cohen, 50, Canadian politician, member of the House of Commons of Canada (1993- ).
- Christine Fulwylie-Bankston, 82, American poet, publisher, and civil rights activist.
- Bill Looby, 67, American soccer player and Olympian (1956).
- Pertti Mattila, 89, Finnish Olympic skier (1936).
- Archie Moore, 81, American boxing champion, heart failure.
- Assis Naban, 92, Brazilian Olympic hammer thrower (1936).
- Mohammad-Ja'far Pouyandeh, 44, Iranian writer and activist, strangled.
- Ferdinand Preindl, 86, Austrian Olympic speed skater (1936, 1948).
- Eddie Testa, 88, American Olympic cyclist (1932).

=== 10 ===
- Wim Hora Adema, 84, Dutch children's author and feminist.
- Peter Bosa, 71, Canadian politician, member of the Senate of Canada (1977-).
- Bob Brown, 59, American gridiron football player (Green Bay Packers, San Diego Chargers, Cincinnati Bengals).
- Bob Dille, 81, American basketball player.
- Buddy Feyne, 86, American lyricist.
- Wang Ganchang, 91, Chinese nuclear physicist.
- Ray Goossens, 74, Belgian artist, animator, writer and film director (Hergé's Adventures of Tintin).
- Trygve Haugeland, 84, Norwegian politician .
- Kamel Messaoudi, 37, Algerian Chaabi musician, traffic collision.
- Charles D. Mize, 77, United States Marine Corps officer, leukemia.
- Joe Pasqua, 80, American football player (Cleveland Rams, Washington Redskins, Los Angeles Rams).
- Berta Singerman, 97, Belarusian-Argentine singer and actress, cardiovascular disease.
- Vida Tomšič, 85, Slovenian communist and World War II partisan fighter.

=== 11 ===
- Jack Coleman, 74, American basketball player (Rochester Royals, St. Louis Hawks).
- George Glennie, 96, American football player (Racine Tornadoes).
- Irma Hünerfauth, 90, German painter and sculptor.
- Gunnar Johansson, 79, Swedish sprint canoeist and Olympian (1948).
- André Lichnerowicz, 83, French differential geometer and mathematical physicist.
- Jimmy Mackay, 54, Scottish-Australian football player.
- Kavi Pradeep, 83, Indian poet and songwriter.
- Chen Puru, 80, Chinese politician.
- Anton Stankowski, 92, German graphic designer, photographer and painter.
- Lynn Strait, 30, American singer and vocalist of band Snot, traffic collision.
- Max Streibl, 66, German politician.

=== 12 ===
- Max Boydston, 66, American gridiron football player (Chicago Cardinals, Dallas Texans, Oakland Raiders).
- Lawton Chiles, 68, American politician, United States Senator from Florida (1971–1989), and Governor of Florida (since 1991), heart attack.
- Marco Denevi, 76, Argentine novelist, lawyer and journalist.
- Jimmy "Orion" Ellis, 53, American singer, shot.
- Denny Galehouse, 87, American baseball player (Cleveland Indians, Boston Red Sox, St. Louis Browns).
- Willis J. Gertsch, 92, American arachnologist.
- Vadim Gulyaev, 57, Russian water polo player and Olympic champion (1968, 1972).
- William A. Marra, 70, American politician.
- Eugenio Montessoro, 86, Italian Olympic equestrian (1948).
- Don Patterson, 88, American producer, animator, and director.
- Mo Udall, 76, American politician, member of the United States House of Representatives (1961-1991), Parkinson's disease.

=== 13 ===
- Helen Adolf, 102, Austrian–American linguist and literature scholar.
- Willem den Toom, 87, Dutch politician.
- Dean Fausett, 85, American painter.
- Lew Grade, 91, British impresario.
- Harvey Jones, 77, American gridiron football player (Cleveland Rams, Washington Redskins).
- James W. Kehoe, 73, American district judge (United States District Court for the Southern District of Florida).
- Douglas de Souza, 26, Brazilian long jumper and Olympian (1996).
- Richard Thomas, 66, British admiral and Black Rod.
- Ariadna Welter, 68, Mexican movie actress.
- Liang Xiang, 79, Chinese politician.
- Norbert Zongo, 49, Burkinabé investigative journalist, shot. (body discovered on this date)

=== 14 ===
- Vittorio Cottafavi, 84, Italian film director and screenwriter.
- Norman Fell, 74, American actor (Three's Company, The Graduate, Bullitt), bone marrow cancer.
- A. Leon Higginbotham, Jr., 70, African-American civil rights advocate, author and judge, stroke.
- Yuriy Hromak, 50, Ukrainian backstroke swimmer and Olympic medalist (1968).
- James A. Jensen, 80, American paleontologist.
- Brian Lewis, 55, English footballer.
- Annette Strauss, 74, American philanthropist and mayor of Dallas, cancer.
- Will Tremper, 70, German journalist and filmmaker, heart attack.

=== 15 ===
- Daniel Langrand, 77, French football player and coach.
- Jan Meyerowitz, 85, Jewish composer, conductor, pianist and writer.
- Rowena Moore, 88, American civil rights activist.
- Robert Paul, 88, French sprinter and Olympian (1936).
- Dean Peters, 40, American professional wrestler and referee, traffic collision.
- Ján Podhradský, 82, Slovak football player.
- Johnny Riddle, 93, American baseball player and coach.
- Paul Rivière, 86, French Resistance fighter during World War II and politician.

=== 16 ===
- Clay Blair, 73, American journalist and author, heart attack.
- Jocelyn Crane, 89, American carcinologist.
- Jean de Montrémy, 85, French industrialist, racing driver, and race car designer.
- William Gaddis, 75, American novelist, prostate cancer.
- Johnny Gorsica, 83, American baseball player (Detroit Tigers).
- Lee Tai-young, 84, Korean lawyer and judge.
- Maneklal Sankalchand Thacker, 94, Indian engineer and academic.
- Philip True, 50, American foreign correspondent, homicide. (body discovered on this date)
- Marcelo Visentín, 84, Argentine Olympic water polo player (1948, 1952).

=== 17 ===
- Kevin Brennan, 78, Australian-born British-based film and television actor.
- John Burns Brooksby, 83, Scottish veterinarian.
- Allan D'Arcangelo, 68, American artist and printmaker.
- Joseph Esherick, 86, American architect, heart failure.
- Billy Gooden, 75, Canadian ice hockey player (New York Rangers).
- Antonina Khudyakova, 81, Soviet Air Force officer during World War II.
- Dorothy Nyembe, 66, South African activist and politician.
- Harry Osman, 87, English football player.

=== 18 ===
- Agustín Barboza, 85, Paraguayan singer and composer.
- C. S. Chellappa, 86, Indian writer, journalist and political activist.
- Lev Dyomin, 72, Soviet cosmonaut, (Soyuz 15), cancer.
- Mohammad Taghi Falsafi, 90, Iranian ayatollah and preacher.
- Harry Haddock, 73, Scottish footballer.
- Abdurajak Abubakar Janjalani, 38–39, Filipino militant, founder of Abu Sayyaf, shot.
- Åke Jönsson, 73, Swedish footballer and Olympian (1952).
- John Michaluk, 70, Canadian ice hockey player (Chicago Black Hawks).
- Vinod Mishra, 51, Indian communist politician, heart attack.
- Edwin E. Moise, 79, American mathematician.
- Gilberto Muñoz, 75, Chilean football player.
- Ingar Nordlund, 76, Norwegian Olympic speed skater (1952).
- Tadeusz Rybczynski, 75, Polish-English economist.
- Joseph Edward Stevens Jr., 70, American district judge.
- Sam Tamburo, 72, American football player (New York Bulldogs).
- Max Wehrli, 89, Swiss literary scholar and germanist.

=== 19 ===
- Garry Blaine, 65, Canadian ice hockey player (Montreal Canadiens).
- Cully Dahlstrom, 86, American ice hockey player (Chicago Black Hawks).
- Mel Fisher, 76, American treasure hunter.
- Gordon Gunter, 89, American marine biologist and fisheries scientist.
- Joe Mack, 86, American baseball player (Boston Braves).
- Hec Oakley, 89, Australian cricketer.
- Antonio Ordóñez, 66, Spanish bullfighter, liver cancer.
- Bernhard Tessmann, 86, German rocket scientist during and after World War II.
- Doug Tomalin, 84, British diver and Olympian (1936).
- Ron Turner, 76, British illustrator and comic book artist, stroke and heart attack.
- Qian Zhongshu, 88, Chinese literary scholar and writer, cancer.

=== 20 ===
- John Anderson, 69, American baseball player.
- Federico Bisson, 62, Italian Olympic triple jumper (1960).
- Jacques Butin, 73, French Olympic field hockey player (1948).
- André Dewavrin, 87, French officer and resistance member during World War II.
- E. W. Etchells, 87, American sailor and sailboat designer.
- Angelo Grizzetti, 82, French-Italian football player and coach.
- Irene Hervey, 89, American actress, heart failure.
- Bindy Johal, 27, Indo-Canadian gangster.
- Sir Alan Hodgkin, 84, British scientist, recipient of the Nobel Prize in Physiology or Medicine.
- William Matthew Kidd, 80, American district judge.
- Kazimierz Kropidłowski, 67, Polish long jumper and Olympian (1956, 1960).
- Bangalore Venkata Raman, 86, Indian astrologer.
- Miklós Sárkány, 90, Hungarian water polo player and Olympic champion (1932, 1936).

=== 21 ===
- Roger Avon, 84, British actor.
- Ray Bellingham, 82, American basketball player.
- Gilbert Charles-Picard, 85, French historian and archaeologist.
- Avril Coleridge-Taylor, 95, English pianist, conductor, and composer.
- Adelaide Hawley Cumming, 93, American vaudeville performer, radio host, and television personality.
- Karl Denver, 67, Scottish singer, brain tumor.
- Anne Ferguson, 57, Scottish physician and clinical researcher, pancreatic cancer.
- Clifford Inniss, 88, Barbadian cricketer.
- Sándor Ivády, 95, Hungarian water polo player and Olympic champion (1928, 1932).
- Ernst Günther Schenck, 94, German doctor and member of the SS.
- Béla Szőkefalvi-Nagy, 85, Hungarian mathematician.
- Jerzy Topolski, 70, Polish historian.
- Sir Richard Turnbull, 89, British colonial governor.

=== 22 ===
- Pedro Araya, 73, Chilean Olympic basketball player (1952, 1956).
- Leif Erickson, 92, American attorney and politician.
- Virginia Graham, 86, American talk show host, heart attack.
- Robert Haynes, 67, Canadian geneticist and biophysicist.
- Jean Malaquais, 90, French novelist.
- Jorge Martí, 68, Spanish Olympic sailor (1960).
- Subhashis Nag, 43, Indian mathematician.
- Donald Soper, 95, British methodist minister and pacifist.
- Jeannot Welter, 70, Luxembourgian Olympic boxer (1948, 1952).

=== 23 ===
- Mark Chatfield, 45, American breaststroke swimmer and Olympian (1972), lymphoma.
- Jack Hilton, 77, English rugby player.
- Peggy Kelman, 89, Australian aviation pioneer.
- Matthías Kristjánsson, 74, Icelandic Olympic cross-country skier (1952).
- Ratnappa Kumbhar, 89, Indian independence activist.
- David Manners, 98, Canadian-American actor (Dracula, The Mummy, A Bill of Divorcement).
- Joe Orlando, 71, Italian American illustrator, writer and cartoonist.
- Anatoly Rybakov, 87, Soviet and Russian writer.
- Richard Sligh, 54, American football player (Oakland Raiders).
- Michelle Thomas, 30, American actress (Family Matters, The Young and the Restless, The Cosby Show) and comedian, cancer.
- Pierre Vallières, 60, Québécois journalist and writer, heart failure.

=== 24 ===
- Syl Apps, 83, Canadian ice hockey player (Toronto Maple Leafs), and Olympic pole vaulter (1936), heart attack.
- Viola Farber, 67, American choreographer and dancer.
- Matt Gillies, 77, Scottish football player and manager.
- Peter Janssens, 64, German musician and composer.
- Daan Kagchelland, 84, Dutch sailor and Olympic champion (1936).
- William R. Perl, 92, American lawyer and psychologist.
- Raemer Schreiber, 88, American physicist.
- Estelle Witherspoon, 82, American artist, civil rights activist and quilter.

=== 25 ===
- Katharina Brauren, 88, German actress.
- Alfredo Covelli, 84, Italian politician.
- Damita Jo DeBlanc, 68, American actress, comedian, and singer, respiratory disease.
- Denny Elliot, 84, American basketball player.
- Dennis Raymond Knapp, 86, American district judge (United States District Court for the Southern District of West Virginia).
- Bryan MacLean, 52, American singer, guitarist and songwriter, heart attack.
- Mike McAlary, 41, American journalist and columnist, colorectal cancer.
- John McGrath, 60, English football player and manager.
- Hans Oeschger, 71, Swiss climatologist.
- Richard Paul, 58, American actor, cancer.
- Bill Phillips, 96, Canadian ice hockey player (Montreal Maroons).
- John Pulman, 75, English snooker player, fall.

=== 26 ===
- Dewey Adkins, 80, American baseball player (Washington Senators, Chicago Cubs).
- Cathal Goulding, 75, Northern Irish Republican and IRA member, cancer.
- Dick Grove, 71, American musician, composer, and arranger.
- Hurd Hatfield, 81, American actor, heart attack.
- Helmut Mahlke, 85, German Oberstleutnant in the Luftwaffe during World War II.
- Michael Sherard, 88, British fashion designer.
- Ram Swarup, 78, Indian author.

=== 27 ===
- Kevork Ajemian, 66, Lebanese-Armenian writer, journalist, novelist and activist.
- Dany Bustros, 39, Lebanese belly dancer, socialite and stage actress, suicide by gunshot.
- Glyn Charles, 33, British sailor and Olympian (1996).
- Anita Hoffman, 56, American writer and activist, breast cancer.
- Anne Holm, 76, Danish journalist and children's writer.
- Robert S. Johnson, 78, American fighter pilot during World War II.
- Joe Parker, 75, American gridiron football player (Chicago Cardinals).
- Roy Powell, 33, English rugby league player, heart attack.
- Ralegh Radford, 98, English archaeologist and historian.
- Ricardo Tormo, 46, Spanish motorcycle road racer, leukemia.

=== 28 ===
- André Bizette-Lindet, 92, French sculptor.
- Herbert Fechner, 85, East German politician.
- William Frankfather, 54, American actor (Death Becomes Her, Harry and the Hendersons, Mouse Hunt), complications from liver disease.
- Edgar Hovhannisyan, 68, Armenian composer.
- Ron Huntington, 77, Canadian politician.
- Werner Müller, 78, German composer and conductor of classical music.
- Shorty Rollins, 69, American racing driver.
- Robert Rosen, 64, American theoretical biologist.
- Harold Schindler, 69, American journalist and historian.
- Ouang Te Tchao, 93, Chinese physicist.
- Mary Ann Unger, 53, American abstract sculptor, breast cancer.
- Bjørn Watt-Boolsen, 75, Danish film actor.

=== 29 ===
- Geoff Crawford, 82, Australian politician.
- László Cseri, 86, Hungarian Olympic field hockey player (1936).
- George Curran, 80, English rugby league football player.
- Spyros Defteraios, 79, Greek Olympic wrestler (1948, 1956).
- Hubert Deschamps, 75, French actor, heart attack.
- Bill Kennedy, 79, American football player (Detroit Tigers, Boston Yanks).
- Phyllis Kennedy, 84, American film actress.
- Jack D. Moore, 92, American set decorator.
- Don Taylor, 78, American actor and film director, heart failure.

=== 30 ===
- Joan Brossa, 79, Catalan poet, playwright and visual artist.
- Jean-Claude Forest, 68, French writer and illustrator of comics, asthma.
- Jack Graham, 82, American baseball player (Brooklyn Dodgers, New York Giants, St. Louis Browns).
- Walker Hancock, 97, American sculptor and teacher.
- Rune Johansson, 78, Swedish ice hockey player and Olympian (1948, 1952).
- Keisuke Kinoshita, 86, Japanese film director, stroke.
- Johnny Moore, 64, American R&B singer with The Drifters, pneumonia.
- Sam Muchnick, 93, American professional wrestling promoter.
- Ansar Razak, 24, Indonesian football player, traffic collision.
- Karl Heinz Rechinger, 92, Austrian botanist and phytogeographer.
- Otto Wachs, 89, German sailor and Olympic medalist (1936).
- George Webb, 86, British actor.

=== 31 ===
- Kirsty Bentley, 15, New Zealand teenager, blunt force trauma.
- George Lynn Cross, 93, American botanist and author.
- H. Dunlop Dawbarn, 83, American businessman, philanthropist and politician.
- Ted Glossop, 64, Australian rugby player and coach, cancer.
- Les Hammond, 90, Canadian politician.
- Gene Harlow, 79, American football player and coach.
- Alan Morris, 44, English football player, homicide.
- Erling Norvik, 70, Norwegian politician.
- Arnold Stickley, 72, English golfer.
- Jerry Williams, 75, American football player (Los Angeles Rams, Philadelphia Eagles), and coach, leukemia.
