= Antonio Cabrera =

Antonio Cabrera may refer to:

- Antonio Cabrera (Argentine footballer) (born 1943), Argentine footballer
- Antonio Cabrera (Paraguayan footballer), Paraguayan footballer
- Antonio Cabrera (cyclist) (born 1981), Chilean track cyclist
