= Dagoberto =

Dagoberto is the name of:

== Football ==
- Dagoberto (Brazilian footballer)
- Dagoberto Currimilla, Chilean footballer
- Dagoberto Fontes, Uruguayan footballer
- Dagoberto Ojeda, Colombian footballer
- Dagoberto Portillo, Salvadoran footballer
- Dagoberto Quesada, Cuban footballer

== Other ==
- Dagoberto Campos Salas, Costa Rican Catholic prelate
- Dagoberto Gama, Mexican actor
- Dagoberto Godoy, Chilean aviator
- Dagoberto Gilb, American writer
- Dagoberto Peña, Dominican basketball player
- Dagoberto Valdés Hernández, Cuban Catholic intellectual
