= Alejandro Arce =

Paraguayan footballer

Personal information
- Date of death: before 1 April 2003

Senior career*
Years	Team	Apps	(Gls)
- Guaraní

International career
1953–1955	Paraguay	6	(1)
Medal record
Representing Paraguay
Copa América
Winner	1953 Peru
- * Club domestic league appearances and goals

Alejandro Arce (died before 1 April 2003) was a Paraguayan footballer. He was part of Paraguay's squad that won the 1953 South American Championship.

== International career ==
Arce was selected in Paraguay's squad for the 1953 South American Championship. He only played one game in the tournament, against Peru on 8 March, as Paraguay won the competition, its first Copa America. It was his first cap with Paraguay.

Arce was also included in Paraguay's squad for the 1955 South American Championship. He played all five games in the tournament, and the game against Chile on 20 March was his sixth and last cap for Paraguay.
