= Rafael Souto =

Uruguayan footballer (born 1930)

Personal information
- Full name: Rafael Ángel Souto Castro
- Date of birth: 24 October 1930
- Place of birth: Montevideo, Uruguay
- Date of death: unknown
- Height: 1.68 m (5 ft 6 in)
- Position: Forward

Senior career*
Years	Team	Apps	(Gls)
1950-1955	Club Nacional de Football	64	(24)
1955-1957	Atlético Madrid	5	(1)
1957	Club Nacional de Football	16	(7)
1958	Elche CF		
1958-1959	Deportivo de La Coruña	18	(4)

International career
1953-1954	Uruguay	6	(0)
- * Club domestic league appearances and goals

Rafael Ángel Souto Castro (born 24 October 1930, date of death unknown) was a Uruguayan football forward who played for Uruguay in the 1954 FIFA World Cup.

== Club career ==
Souto started his career in 1950 at Club Nacional de Football. In 1955 he transferred to Atlético Madrid.

Then, in 1957, he went back to Club Nacional de Football.

Souto played for Elche CF in 1958 and Deportivo de La Coruña in 1958-1959.

== International career ==
Souto was selected in Uruguay’s squad for the 1953 South American Championship. During the tournament, he got his first cap against Chile on 01/03/1953. He played two other games against Brazil and hosts Peru as Uruguay finished third of the competition.

In 1954, Souto played two friendly games against European nations : against Switzerland on 25 may, and Saarland on 5 June. This was Saarland’s only game against a non-UEFA team during its short-lived story.

Souto was selected in Uruguay’s squad for the 1954 FIFA World Cup. He only played one game in the tournament, the semifinal against Hungary which Uruguay lost 4-2. The game against Hungary was Couto’s 6th and last cap.
