= Milner Ayala =

Paraguayan footballer (1928–2001)

Personal information
- Date of birth: 3 September 1928
- Date of death: 29 July 2001 (aged 72)
- Position: Forward

Senior career*
Years	Team	Apps	(Gls)
1952–1953	River Plate		
1953–1955	RC Strasbourg	19	(3)
1955–1957	CA Paris	58	(17)
1957–1958	Red Star	23	(7)

International career
1953	Paraguay	2	(0)
Medal record
Representing Paraguay
Copa América
Winner	1953 Peru
- * Club domestic league appearances and goals

Milner Ayala (3 September 1928 – 29 July 2001) was a Paraguayan footballer who played as a forward. He was part of Paraguay's squad that won the 1953 South American Championship.

== International career ==
Ayala was selected in Paraguay's squad for the 1953 South American Championship. He played two games during the tournament, on 4 March against Ecuador, and on 8 March against Peru, as Paraguay won the competition, its first Copa America.

Those two games were his only caps with Paraguay.

During the game against Peru, as Peruvians were leading by 2–1 and Paraguay was disallowed an equalizing goal, he kicked the referee. The game was stopped, then restarted. Paraguay eventually equalized and the game ended in a draw 2–2. However Peru was awarded a win because Paraguay made four changes instead of the legal three, including the one of Ayala who had replaced Atilio López. Ayala was banned three years for his gesture.
