= Robustiano Maciel =

Paraguayan footballer (1933–2019)

Personal information
- Date of birth: 24 May 1930
- Date of death: 5 September 2019 (aged 89)

Senior career*
Years	Team	Apps	(Gls)
1952–1953	Libertad		
1956	Sol de América		

International career
1953–1956	Paraguay	18	(0)

Managerial career
- 1979: Sol de América
- 1981: Cerro Porteño
Medal record
Representing Paraguay
Copa América
Winner	1953 Peru
- * Club domestic league appearances and goals

Robustiano Maciel (24 May 1930 – 5 September 2019) was a Paraguayan football player and manager. He was part of Paraguay's squad that won the 1953 South American Championship.

== International career ==
Maciel was selected in Paraguay's 1953 South American Championship squads for the 1953 South American Championship. He played three games during the tournament, against Chile, Ecuador and hosts Peru, as Paraguay won the competition for the first time. The game against Chile on 25 February was his first cap with Paraguay.

Maciel was again in Paraguay's squad for the 1955 South American Championship. He played five games during the tournament.

He was also in the squad for the 1956 South American Championship.

The friendly game against Brazil on 17 June 1956 was his 18th and last cap with Paraguay.
