= Adolfo Riquelme =

Paraguayan footballer (1928–2022)

Personal information
- Full name: Carlos Adolfo Riquelme Miranda
- Date of birth: 10 September 1928
- Place of birth: San Antonio, Paraguay
- Date of death: 19 June 2022 (aged 93)
- Place of death: Asunción, Paraguay
- Position: Goalkeeper

Senior career*
Years	Team	Apps	(Gls)
1951–1953	Nacional de Asunción		
1953–1955	Atlético Madrid	24	(0)
1956–1959	Atlético Chalaco		
1960–1961	Alianza Lima		
1962–1965	América de Cali		
1966–1970	Atlético Bucaramanga		
1971	Real Cartagena	45	(0)

International career
1953–1959	Paraguay	8	(0)
Medal record
Representing Paraguay
Copa América
Winner	1953 Peru
- * Club domestic league appearances and goals

Carlos Adolfo Riquelme Miranda (10 September 1928 – 19 June 2022) was a Paraguayan footballer. He was the last surviving member of Paraguay's squad that won the 1953 South American Championship.

== International career ==
Riquelme was part of Paraguay's squad that won the 1953 South American Championship. He played six games during the tournament, including the final against Brazil which enabled Paraguay to win its first Copa America. The game against Chile on 25 February was his first cap for Paraguay.

Riquelme was again in Paraguay's squad for the 1959 South American Championship (Ecuador). He played two games during the tournament, against Argentina on 9 December, and against Uruguay on 22 December. The game against Uruguay was his eighth and last cap with Paraguay.
