= Pablo León =

Paraguayan footballer (died before 01/04/2003)

Personal information
- Position: Forward

Senior career*
Years	Team	Apps	(Gls)
- Guaraní

International career
1953	Paraguay	1	(1)
Medal record
Representing Paraguay
Copa América
Winner	1953 Peru
- * Club domestic league appearances and goals

Pablo León (died before 1 April 2003) was a Paraguayan footballer. He was part of Paraguay's squad that won the 1953 South American Championship.

== International career ==
León was selected in Paraguay's squad for the 1953 South American Championship. An unused substitute through the first five games, he was the water carrier ("aguatero") for his teammates.

On 27 March, for the sixth and decisive game against Brazil, León came on as a substitute in the 85th minute and scored the winning goal in the 89th, enabling Paraguay to tie with Brazil for classification. A playoff was then played between the two teams (León didn't play it), Paraguay was victorious and won its first Copa America.

It was León's only cap and goal with Paraguay.
