= Inocencio González =

Paraguayan footballer (1929–2004)

Personal information
- Date of birth: 28 December 1929
- Date of death: 17 March 2004 (aged 74)
- Position: Forward

Senior career*
Years	Team	Apps	(Gls)
?–1953	Sportivo Luqueño		
1953–1954	Nîmes	11	(6)
1955–1956	Grenoble	12	(7)

International career
1953	Paraguay	2	(0)
Medal record
Representing Paraguay
Copa América
Winner	1953 Peru
- * Club domestic league appearances and goals

Inocencio González (28 December 1929 – 17 March 2004) was a Paraguayan footballer who played as a forward. He was part of Paraguay's squad that won the 1953 South American Championship.

== International career ==
González was selected in Paraguay's squad for the 1953 South American Championship. He played two games in the tournament, both against Brazil, on 27 March and 1 April. The latter was the final of the competition. Paraguay defeated Brazil, winning its first Copa America. Those were his only caps with Paraguay.
