= Alfredo Olivos =

Chilean footballer (1924-1983)

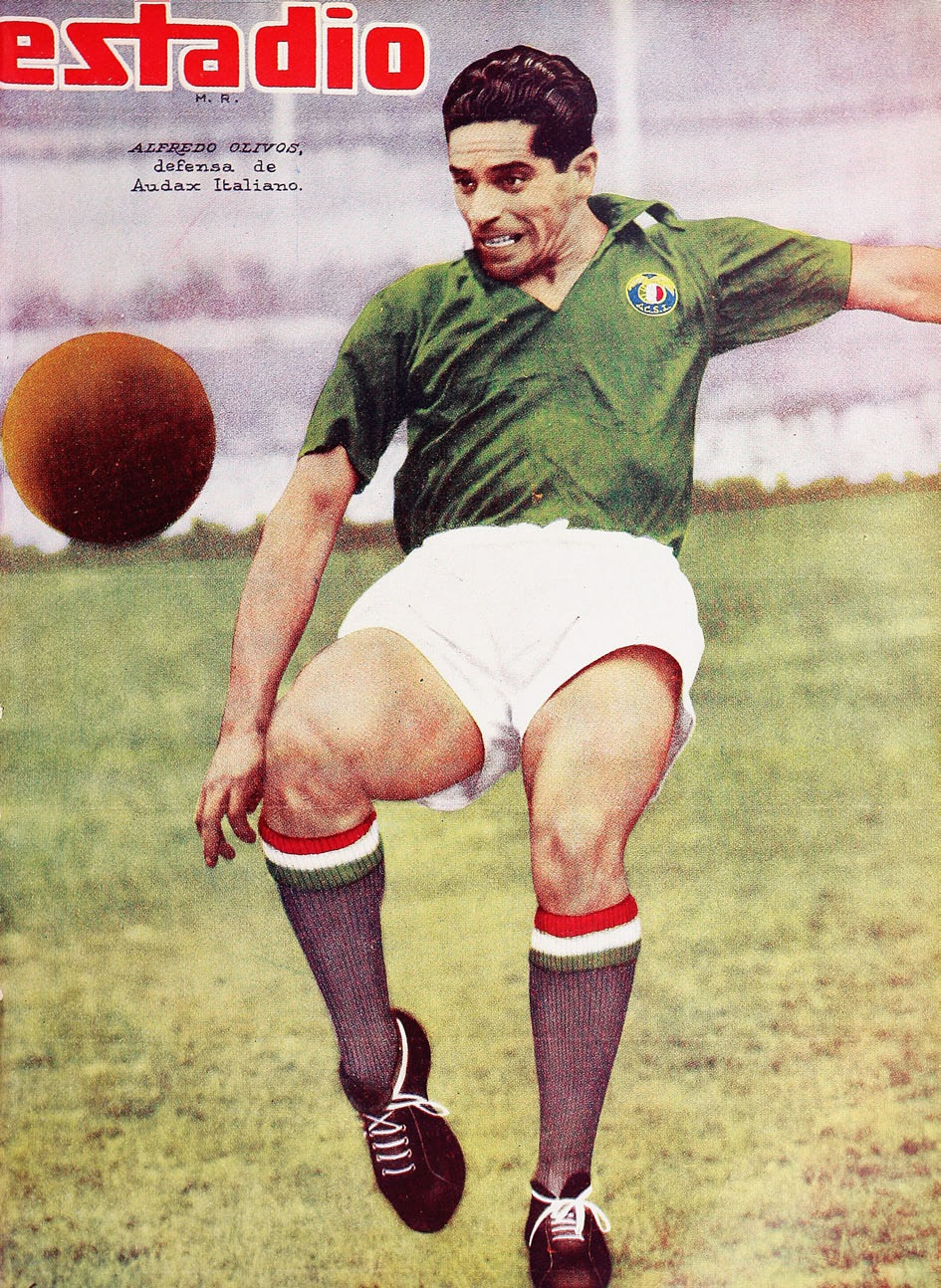

Personal information
- Full name: Alfredo Segundo Olivos Araya
- Date of birth: 28 May 1924
- Place of birth: Huara, Chile
- Date of death: 31 July 1983 (aged 59)
- Place of death: Copiapó, Chile
- Position: Defender

Senior career*
Years	Team	Apps	(Gls)
- Audax Italiano

International career
1953	Chile	1	(0)
- * Club domestic league appearances and goals

Alfredo Segundo Olivos Araya (28 May 1924 – 31 July 1983) was a Chilean footballer. He played in one match for the Chile national football team, coming on as a substitute during a 3–2 loss to Brazil in the 1953 South American Championship.
