= Augusto Arenas =

Chilean footballer (1929–2015)

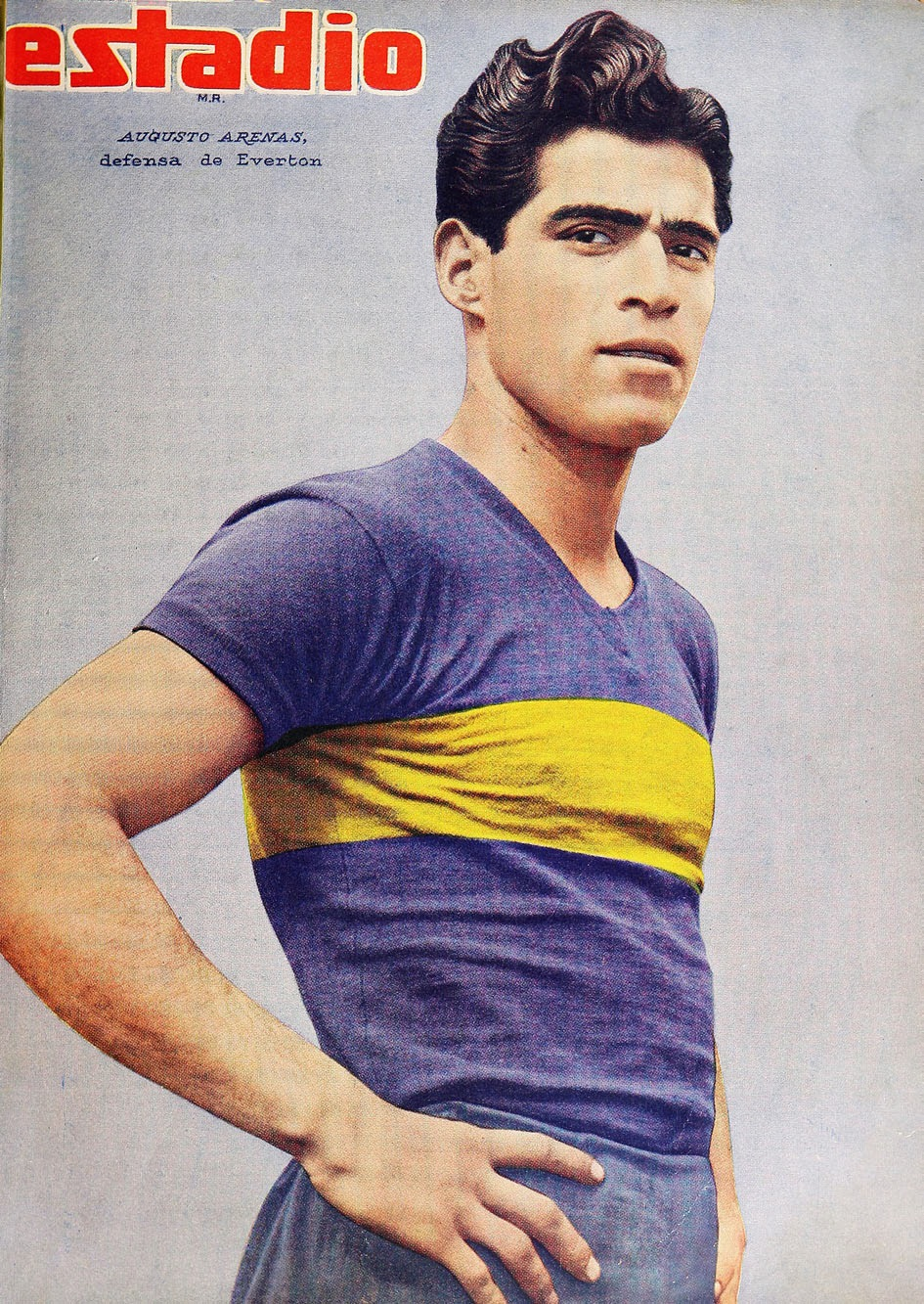

Personal information
- Date of birth: 15 March 1929
- Place of birth: Viña del Mar, Chile
- Date of death: 24 March 2015 (aged 86)

International career
Years	Team	Apps	(Gls)
1953	Chile	1	(0)

Augusto Arenas (15 March 1929 – 24 March 2015) was a Chilean footballer. He played in one match for the Chile national football team in 1953. He was also part of Chile's squad for the 1953 South American Championship.
