= Luis Lacasa (footballer) =

Paraguayan footballer (1927/28–2014)

Personal information
- Date of birth: 1927 or 1928
- Date of death: 10 October 2014 (aged 86)
- Place of death: Asunción, Paraguay
- Position: Midfielder

Senior career*
Years	Team	Apps	(Gls)
- Club Nacional

International career
1953	Paraguay	5	(0)
Medal record
Representing Paraguay
Copa América
Winner	1953 Peru
- * Club domestic league appearances and goals

Luis Lacasa (1927 or 1928 – 10 October 2014) was a Paraguayan footballer who played as a midfielder. He was part of Paraguay's squad that won the 1953 South American Championship.

== International career ==
Lacasa was selected in Paraguay's squad for the 1953 South American Championship. He played five games in the tournament, including the victorious final against Brazil as Paraguay won its first Copa America. Those were Lacasa’s only caps with Paraguay.

== Death ==
Lacasa died on 10 October 2014, at the age of 86.
