= Antonio Cabrera (Paraguayan footballer) =

Paraguayan footballer

Personal information
- Full name: Antonio Cabrera Prates
- Place of birth: Paraguay
- Position: Defender

Senior career*
Years	Team	Apps	(Gls)
1946–1953	Club Libertad		
1954–1955	Bangu		
1956–1957	Club Libertad		

International career
1949–1954	Paraguay	10	(0)
Medal record
Representing Paraguay
Copa América
Winner	1953 Peru
- * Club domestic league appearances and goals

Antonio Cabrera Prates (died before 1 April 2003) was a Paraguayan football defender who was part of Paraguay's squads for the 1950 FIFA World Cup. and the 1953 South American Championship, the latter of which being won by Paraguay. He also played for Club Libertad. Cabrera is deceased.

== International career ==
Cabrera was selected in Paraguay's squad for the 1949 South American Championship and played only one game in the tournament, on 13 April against Peru. It was his first cap with Paraguay.

Cabrera was also part of the Paraguay squad at the 1950 World Cup but was an unused substitute and played neither of Paraguay’s two games against Sweden and Italy.

In 1951 he played two friendlies, on 5 March against Chile, and on 7 March against Argentina.

Cabrera was selected for the 1953 South American Championship, and played three games as Paraguay won its first Copa America.

Finally, he played four games during 1954 FIFA World Cup qualification, the game against Brazil on 21 March 1954 being his 10th and last cap with Paraguay.
