= Melanio Olmedo =

Paraguayan footballer (1932–2012)

Personal information
- Full name: Melanio Olmedo Bretón
- Date of birth: 19 January 1932
- Date of death: 4 February 2012 (aged 80)
- Place of death: Ciudad del Este, Paraguay
- Position: Defender

Senior career*
Years	Team	Apps	(Gls)
1948-1955	Sol de América		
1955-1958	FC Barcelona	22	(1)
1956-1957	→ UE Lleida (loan)	6	(0)
1957-1958	→ CE Europa (loan)		
1958-1959	Lusitano Evora	17	(2)
1959-1960	Marítimo		

International career
1953-1955	Paraguay	6	(0)
Medal record
Representing Paraguay
Copa América
Winner	1953 Peru
- * Club domestic league appearances and goals

Melanio Olmedo (19 January 1932 – 4 February 2012) was a Paraguayan footballer who played as a defender. He was part of Paraguay's squad that won the 1953 South American Championship.

== International career ==
Olmedo was selected in Paraguay's squad for the 1953 South American Championship in Peru. He played four games in the tournament, including the final against Brazil, a 3–2 win that enabled Paraguay to win the competition, its first Copa America. The game against Uruguay on 12 March was his first cap with Paraguay.

Olmedo's fifth cap was a 1954 FIFA World Cup qualification game against Chile on 21 February 1954.

He was again in Paraguay's squad for the 1955 South American Championship in Chile. He only played one game during the competition, against Peru on 13 March. It was his sixth and last cap with Paraguay.
