= Guillermo Díaz (footballer, born 1926) =

Chilean footballer (1926–2021)

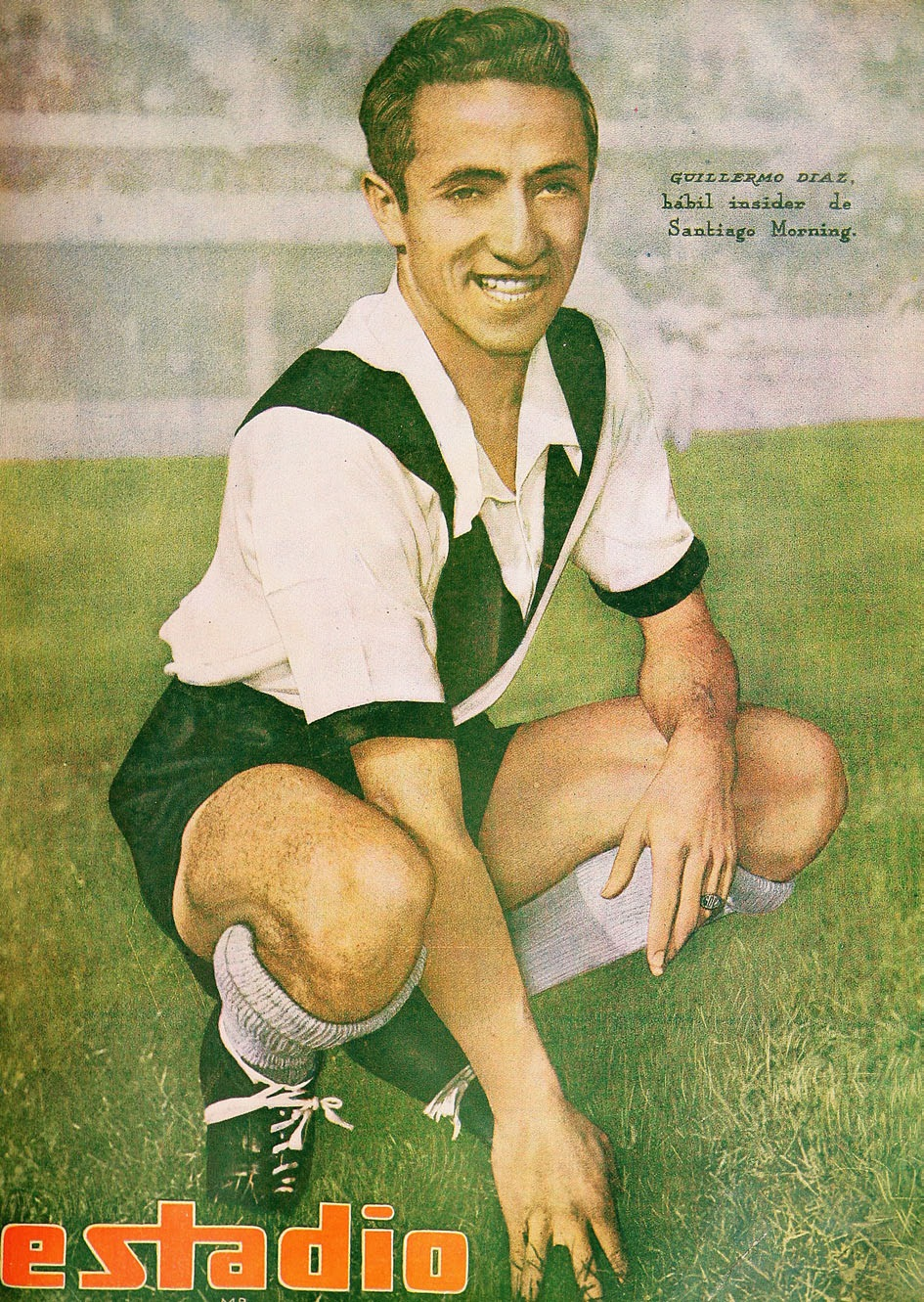

Personal information
- Full name: Guillermo Díaz Carmona
- Date of birth: 25 June 1926
- Place of birth: Santiago, Chile
- Date of death: 24 July 2021 (aged 95)

International career
Years	Team	Apps	(Gls)
1952–1955	Chile	12	(4)

Guillermo Díaz Carmona (25 June 1926 – 24 July 2021) was a Chilean footballer. He played in twelve matches for the Chile national football team from 1952 to 1955. He was also part of Chile's squad for the 1953 South American Championship. Díaz died on 24 July 2021, at the age of 95.
