= Francisco Molina =

Footballer (1930–2018)

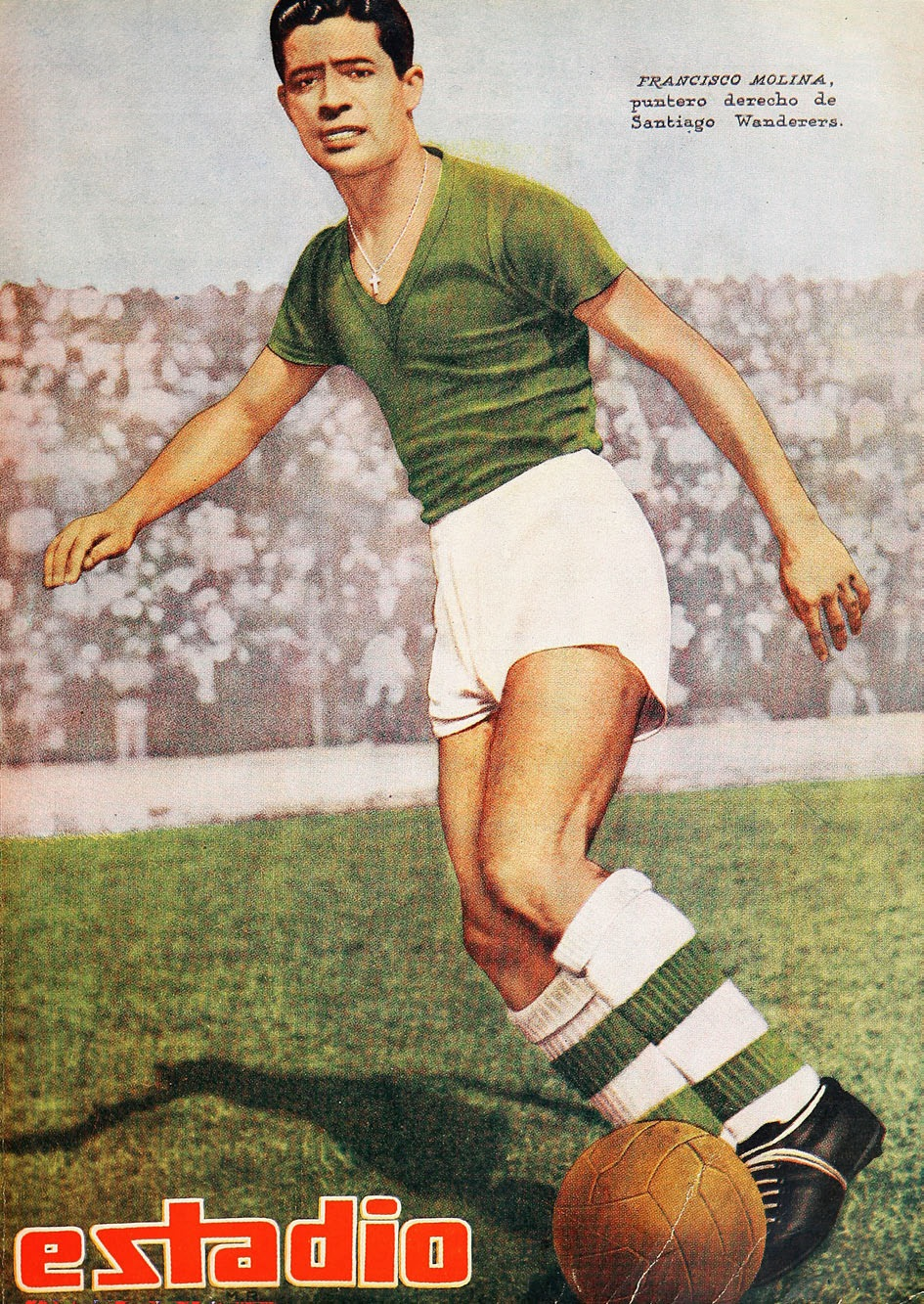
- Molina with Santiago Wanderers in 1950

Personal information
- Full name: Francisco Molina Simón
- Date of birth: 29 March 1930
- Place of birth: Súria, Bages, Spain
- Date of death: 14 November 2018 (aged 88)
- Place of death: Antofagasta, Chile
- Height: 1.81 m (5 ft 11 in)
- Position: Midfielder

Youth career
- Deportivo Roberto Parra
- Santiago Wanderers

Senior career*
Years	Team	Apps	(Gls)
1948–1950	Santiago Wanderers	30	(8)
1951–1952	Universidad Católica	27	(12)
1953–1956	Atlético Madrid	84	(21)
1957–1959	Audax Italiano	42	(14)
1960	Unión Española	23	(4)
1961	Universidad Católica	21	(5)
1963–1964	Coquimbo Unido		
Total		227	(64)

International career
1953–1959	Chile	8	(7)

Managerial career
- 1963–1964: Coquimbo Unido (player/manager)
- 1965: Deportes La Serena
- 1966–1967: Unión Española
- 1968–1969: Colo-Colo
- 1970–1972: Antofagasta Portuario
- 1980: O'Higgins
- 1981: Everton
- * Club domestic league appearances and goals

Francisco "Paco" Molina Simón (29 March 1930 – 14 November 2018) was a football player and manager. Born in Spain, he played for the Chile national team at international level.

== Life and club career ==
Born in Súria, Province of Barcelona, Spain, Molina alongside his family moved to Chile when he was nine in 1939. They settled at Valparaíso after arriving there on board of SS Winnipeg as one of the 2,200 exiles which escaped from the Spanish Civil War. In 1942 he was naturalized Chilean.

During 1940s Molina joined Santiago Wanderers youth set-up with prior spell playing at amateur club Deportivo Roberto Parra. Finally in 1948, he was promoted to Wanderers first-adult team squad aged eighteen. In Chile, he played for Universidad Católica, Audax Italiano, Unión Española and Coquimbo Unido. He is considered the first Chilean player to be successful in Spain after his step in Atlético Madrid from 1953 to 1956.

== International career ==
Molina made his international debut in a friendly match versus Yugoslav club Hajduk on 18 February 1953, where he scored a goal and Chile won 4–1. Including this match, he made a total of 8 appearances for the Chile national team, representing it at both the 1953 South American Championship, becoming the top goalscorer of the tournament with 8 goals in 6 matches, and the friendly match versus Brazil in 1959.

== Coaching career ==
He began his coaching career in Coquimbo Unido, at the same he was a player. Next, he coached several clubs at the Chilean Primera División, including Colo-Colo.

== Honours ==
Audax Italiano

- Primera División de Chile: 1957

Universidad Católica

- Primera División de Chile: 1961

Individual

- South American Championship top scorer: 1953
