= Haroldo (footballer, born 1931) =

Brazilian footballer (1931–2010)

Personal information
- Full name: Haroldo Rodrigues Magalhães Castro
- Date of birth: 20 December 1931
- Place of birth: Rio de Janeiro, Brazil
- Date of death: 16 July 2010 (aged 78)
- Place of death: Rio de Janeiro, Brazil
- Position: Centre-back

Senior career*
Years	Team	Apps	(Gls)
1950–1952	Botafogo		
1952–1954	Vasco da Gama		
1954–1955	Palmeiras		
1955–1957	Vasco da Gama		

International career
1953	Brazil	2	(0)
- * Club domestic league appearances and goals

Haroldo Rodrigues Magalhães Castro (20 December 1931 – 16 July 2010), known mononymously as Haroldo, was a Brazilian footballer who played as a centre-back. He made two matches for the Brazil national team in 1953. He was also part of Brazil's squad for the 1953 South American Championship. Haroldo died in Rio de Janeiro on 16 July 2010, at the age of 78.
