= Dagoberto Ojeda =

Colombian footballer (1918/1919 – 2009)

Personal information
- Date of birth: 1918 or 1919
- Date of death: 15 August 2009 (aged 90)
- Position: Goalkeeper

Senior career*
Years	Team	Apps	(Gls)
- Atlético Junior

International career
1949	Colombia	3	(0)
- * Club domestic league appearances and goals

Dagoberto Ojeda (1918 or 1919 – 15 August 2009) was a Colombian footballer who played as a goalkeeper. He was part of Colombia's squad for the 1949 South American Championship.

== International career ==
Ojeda was selected in Colombia's squad for the 1949 South American Championship. He played three games during the tournament, against Uruguay, Ecuador and Bolivia.

The game against Uruguay on 25 April was his first senior international cap.

Ojeda got his second cap against Ecuador on 3 May.

The game against Bolivia on 6 May was his last cap.
