= Hec Oakley =

Australian cricketer

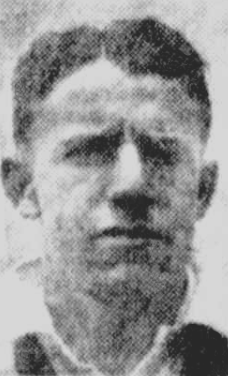

Personal information
- Full name: Hector Herbert Oakley
- Born: 10 January 1909; Melbourne, Australia
- Died: 19 December 1998 (aged 89); Melbourne, Australia

Domestic team information
- Years: Team
- 1930-1939: Victoria
- Source: Cricinfo, 21 November 2015

Hec Oakley (10 January 1909 – 19 December 1998) was an Australian cricketer. He played 28 first-class cricket matches for Victoria between 1930 and 1939. He played for St. Kilda in Victorian district cricket from 1929 to 1948. Ross Oakley's father.

== See also ==
- List of Victoria first-class cricketers
