= Rubén Fernández (footballer) =

Paraguayan footballer (1931–2015)

Personal information
- Full name: Rubén Evaristo Fernández Real
- Date of birth: 2 May 1931
- Place of birth: Villarrica, Paraguay
- Date of death: 9 October 2015 (aged 84)
- Place of death: Buenos Aires, Argentina
- Position: Forward

Youth career
- Club Estero Bellaco

Senior career*
Years	Team	Apps	(Gls)
1950–1953	Club Libertad		
1953–1956	Boca Juniors		
1957–1958	San Lorenzo de Almagro		

International career
1953	Paraguay	7	(4)
Medal record
Representing Paraguay
Copa América
Winner	1953 Peru
- * Club domestic league appearances and goals

Rubén Evaristo Fernández Real (2 May 1931 – 9 October 2015) was a Paraguayan footballer who played as a forward. He captained the Paraguay national team which won the 1953 South American Championship.

== Club career ==
Fernández was born in Villarrica, Paraguay. He started his career around 1946 in the youth divisions of Club Estero Bellaco in Villarrica. In 1950, he moved to Club Libertad. After winning the South American Championship with Paraguay, Fernández moved to Argentine club Boca Juniors, where he played from 1953 to 1956 and won the 1954 Argentine championship. He ended his career at San Lorenzo de Almagro, having played there from 1957 to 1958.

== International career ==
Fernández was part of Paraguay’s squad for the 1953 South American Championship, playing all seven games and scoring four goals, including the third Paraguayan goal in the final against Brazil, enabling Paraguay to win the competition.

Those were his only caps and goals with Paraguay.

== Personal life ==
After being forced to retire from football at the age of 27 due to injuries, Fernández became a dentist.

He died aged 84 on 9 October 2015 in Buenos Aires.
