= Subhashis Nag =

Indian mathematician

- Born: 14 August 1955
- Died: 22 December 1998 (aged 43)
- Education: Cornell University, New York; Don Bosco School, Park Circus, Kolkata
- Awards: Shanti Swarup Bhatnagar Prize for Science and Technology
- Scientific career
- Fields: Complex analytic geometry
- Workplaces: Institute of Mathematical Sciences, Chennai
- Doctoral advisor: Clifford John Earle, Jr.

Subhashis Nag (14 August 1955 – 22 December 1998) was an Indian mathematician who specialised in complex analytic geometry, particularly Teichmüller theory, and its relations to string theory.

He won the Shanti Swarup Bhatnagar Prize for Science and Technology in 1998, the highest science award in India, in the mathematical sciences category. However, he died on 22 December 1998, before the actual award ceremony was held.

== Books authored ==
- The complex analytic theory of Teichmüller spaces. Wiley. 1988. ISBN 9780471627739.
- On some geometrical problems in Teichmüller and Torelli Spaces. Cornell University. 1980.
