= Juan Ángel Romero =

Paraguayan footballer (1934–2009)

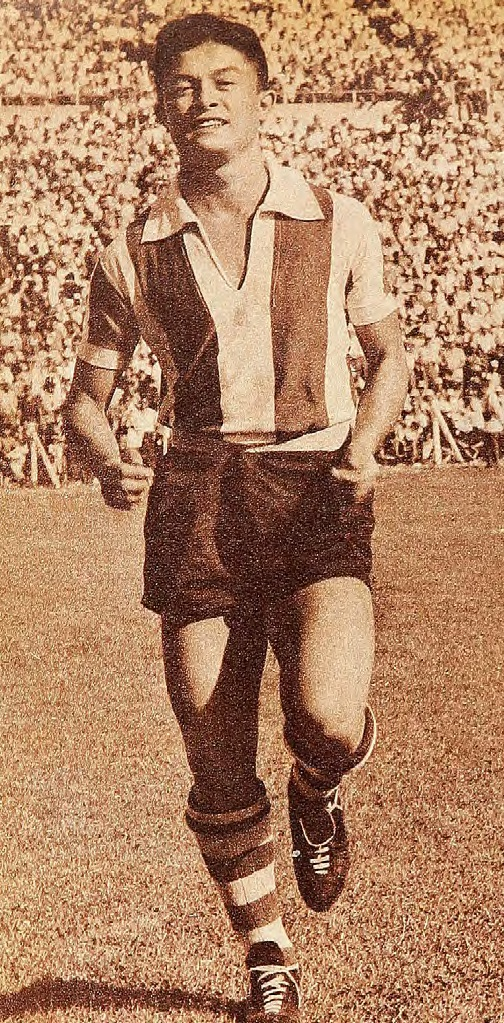
- Romero in 1954

Personal information
- Full name: Juan Ángel Romero Isasi
- Date of birth: 27 December 1934
- Place of birth: Luque, Paraguay
- Date of death: 17 June 2009 (aged 74)
- Place of death: Elche, Spain
- Position: Forward

Senior career*
Years	Team	Apps	(Gls)
1952–1954	Club Olimpia		
1954–1960	Nacional	254	(103)
1960–1967	Elche	184	(77)
1967–1968	Hércules Alicante	33	(2)
1968–1970	Elche Ilicitano	35	(6)

International career
1953–1956	Paraguay	15	(2)

Managerial career
- 1974–1975: Albacete Balompié
- Crevillente Deportivo
- Eldense
- Alicante
- CD Almoradi
- Villena
- Callosa
- Águias
- Aspense
- Monóvar
- El Campello
- 1985: Guaraní
- 1987: Guaraní
- 1995: Guaraní
Medal record
Representing Paraguay
Copa América
Winner	1953 Peru
- * Club domestic league appearances and goals

Juan Ángel Romero (27 December 1934 – 17 June 2009) was a Paraguayan football player and manager. He was part of Paraguay's squad that won the 1953 South American Championship.

== International career ==
Romero was selected in Paraguay's squad for the 1953 South American Championship. He played all seven games and scored one goal in the tournament. as Paraguay won the competition, its first Copa America. The game against Chile on 25 February was his first cap with Paraguay. The goal scored against Bolivia on 16 March was his first with Paraguay.

In February and March 1954, Romero played three 1954 FIFA World Cup qualification games, against Chile and Brazil two times. The game against Chile on 14 February 1954 was actually the first ever CONMEBOL FIFA World Cup qualification game.

Romero was again in Paraguay's squad for the 1955 South American Championship, but this time only played one game, against Chile on 20 March.

On 17 November 1955, during a friendly against Brazil, Romero scored his second and last goal for Paraguay.

He was selected in Paraguay's squad for the 1956 South American Championship and played three games during the tournament. During the tournament, the game against Chile on 12 February was his last cap with Paraguay.
