= Ángel Berni =

Paraguayan footballer (1931–2017)

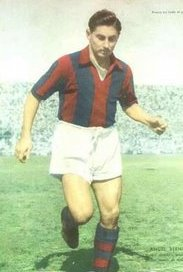
- Berni playing for San Lorenzo in 1955

Personal information
- Full name: Ángel Antonio Berni Gómez
- Date of birth: 9 January 1931
- Place of birth: Asunción, Paraguay
- Date of death: 24 November 2017 (aged 86)
- Place of death: Asunción, Paraguay
- Position: Striker

Youth career
- 1945–1949: Olimpia Asunción

Senior career*
Years	Team	Apps	(Gls)
1949–1951	Olimpia Asunción	?	(?)
1951–1952	Boca de Cali	42	(26)
1953–1957	San Lorenzo	71	(29)
1958	Gimnasia LP	14	(6)
1960–1964	Real Betis	?	(?)

International career
1953	Paraguay	7	(4)
Medal record
Representing Paraguay
Copa América
Winner	1953 Peru
- * Club domestic league appearances and goals

Ángel Antonio Berni Gómez (9 January 1931 – 24 November 2017) was a Paraguayan football striker. He was part of Paraguay’s squads for the 1950 FIFA World Cup and the 1953 South American Championship, the latter of which being won by Paraguay.

== Club career ==
Berni started his career at the youth divisions of Olimpia Asunción in 1945, and in 1949 he made the debut for Olimpia's first team. In 1951 he was transferred to Boca Juniors de Cali and later on played for Argentine clubs San Lorenzo de Almagro (where he became the top scorer for the 1954 season with 29 goals) and Gimnasia y Esgrima de La Plata. His last club was Real Betis of Spain.

== International career ==
Berni was part of the Paraguay squad at the 1950 World Cup but was an unused substitute and played neither of Paraguay’s 2 games against Sweden and Italy.

He also competed in the 1953 Copa América tournament which was won by Paraguay, playing the whole 7 games and scoring 4 goals. Those were his only caps and goals with Paraguay.
