= Luis López (Chilean footballer) =

Chilean footballer (1924-2012)

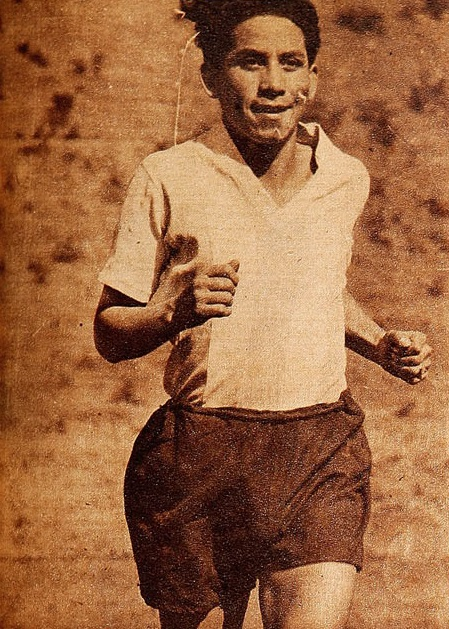

Personal information
- Full name: Luis Alberto López Latorre
- Date of birth: 1 January 1924
- Date of death: 7 July 2012 (aged 88)
- Position: Forward

International career
Years	Team	Apps	(Gls)
1949	Chile	3	(0)

Luis López (1 January 1924 – 7 July 2012) was a Chilean footballer. He played in three matches for the Chile national football team in 1949. He was also part of Chile's squad for the 1949 South American Championship.
