= Urbano Rivera =

Uruguayan footballer (1926-2002)

Personal information
- Date of birth: 1 April 1926
- Place of birth: Uruguay
- Date of death: July 2002 (aged 76)
- Position: Midfielder

Senior career*
Years	Team	Apps	(Gls)
- Danubio F.C.

International career
- Uruguay
- * Club domestic league appearances and goals

Urbano Rivera (1 April 1926 – July 2002) was a Uruguayan football midfielder who played for Uruguay in the 1954 FIFA World Cup. He also played for Danubio F.C. Rivera died in July 2002 at the age of 76.
