= Pierre Mousel =

Luxembourgish footballer

Personal information
- Date of birth: 10 May 1915
- Place of birth: Luxembourg, Luxembourg
- Date of death: 6 December 1998 (aged 83)
- Place of death: Luxembourg, Luxembourg

International career
Years	Team	Apps	(Gls)
- Luxembourg

Pierre Mousel (10 May 1915 – 6 December 1998) was a Luxembourgish footballer. He competed in the men's tournament at the 1936 Summer Olympics.
