= Philip True =

American journalist

- Born: June 18, 1948; San Fernando, California
- Disappeared: December 10, 1998 (aged 50); Tuxpan, Jalisco
- Status: Corpse found
- Died: December 16, 1998 (aged 50)
- Cause of death: Murder
- Body discovered: La Chapalagana Canyon (Huichol for "Canyon of the Twisted Serpent'), Sierra Madre Occidental, Jalisco (state), Mexico
- Education: Los Angeles Valley College and University of California, Irvine (1970)
- Occupation: Journalist
- Years active: 8 years
- Employer: San Antonio Express-News
- Spouse: Martha True
- Children: Philip Theodore "Teo" True

Philip True (June 18, 1948 – December 16, 1998) was an American foreign correspondent in Mexico City, Mexico for the San Antonio Express-News. While on a ten-day, 65-mile trek to learn about the Huichol people in the southern Sierra Madre Occidental, Jalisco, True was murdered. True was the first American journalist to be murdered in Mexico in modern times.

== Early history ==
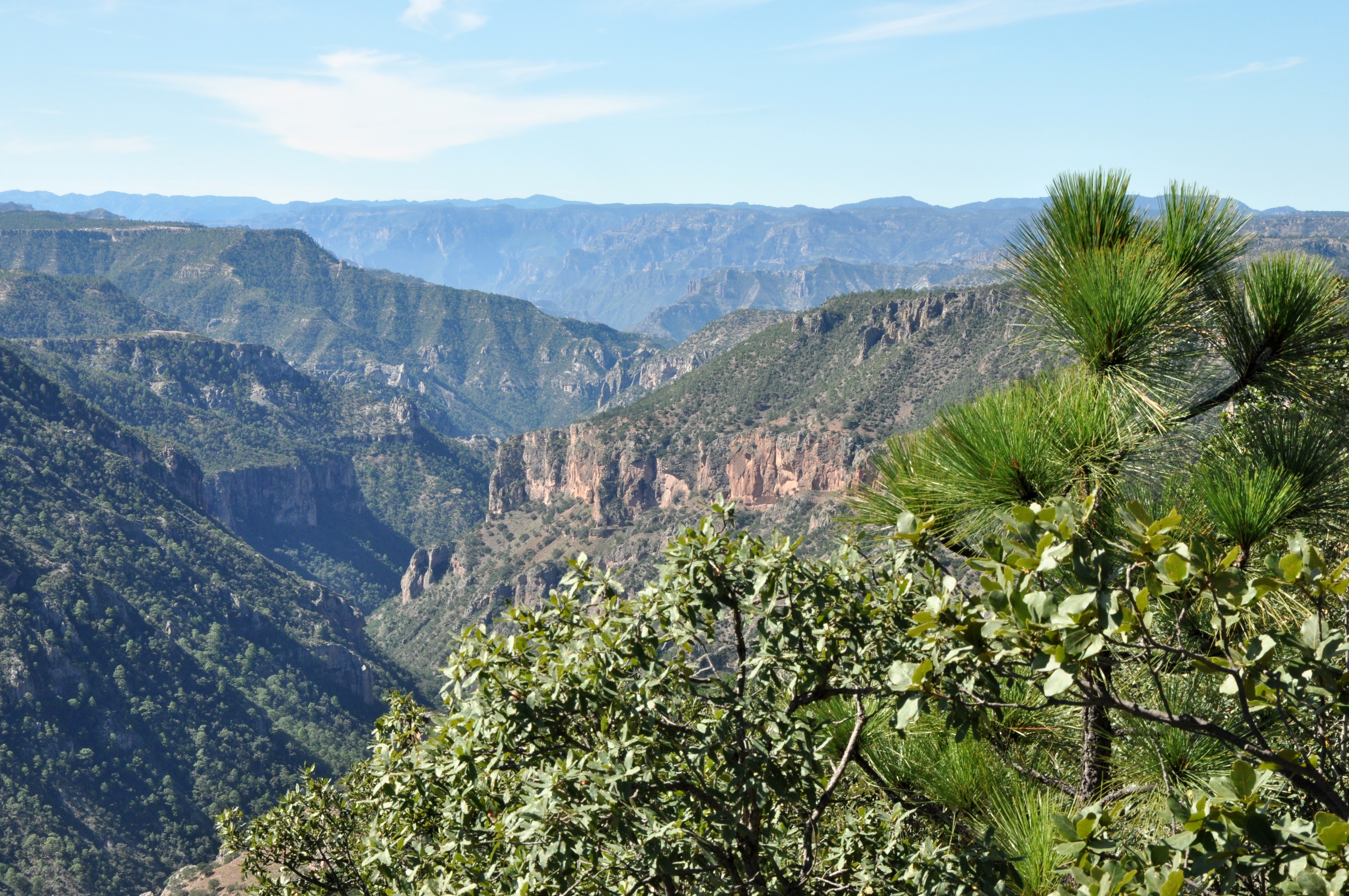
Sierra Madre Occidental with a view across Rio San Ignacio from near the village of Guajurana.

Philip True was from San Fernando, California, and he attended both the Los Angeles Valley College and the University of California, Irvine, where he graduated in 1970. After college he was a dock worker and union representative, as well as a drywaller.

While in his forties, True became a journalist, first for the Brownsville Herald in 1990 and then for the San Antonio Express-News after 1992. As a reporter for the San Antonio Express-News, he had worked the Laredo bureau and then became its correspondent in Mexico City, Mexico. His most notable works of journalism were his coverage of the Chiapas conflict and Pope John Paul II's visit to Cuba in January 1998.

Philip and Martha True were married for 7 years and had lived in Mexico City since 1996. Martha, a native Mexican from Matamoros, worked as the head of a nonprofit environmental agency in Mexico City. When True traveled to learn more about the Huichol Indians, Martha was four months pregnant with their first child. The couple had one son, Teo.

== Disappearance and death ==
Philip True had been a correspondent for San Antonio Express-News in Mexico City for three years in Mexico City. He twice tried to convince his editor to let him pursue a story about the Huichol Indians, who lived in a settlement in the Sierra Madre. After reviewing the idea, Fred Bonativa turned it down, and so True decided to work on it during his vacation time. True planned a ten-day trip that would take him through the state of Jalisco to Nayarit state. He started his journey 1 December 1998 in Tuxpan, Jalisco, was last seen 4 December in Chalmotita, Jalisco, and his wife reported him missing on 10 December. After the initial search for True failed, Robert Rivard, editor of the San Antonio Express-News, convinced the President's office to commit resources to the search and afterward the missing person announcement was widely publicized. Margarito Díaz, a Huichol hunter, announced he had found a body and guided the party to the site. The Mexican army located True's corpse 16 December 1998 inside a 330-foot deep mountain ravine in the Chapalagana Canyon (Translated from Huichol: "Canyon of the Twisted Serpent') on the Jalisco-Nayarit border. True's corpse had been moved between the time Díaz first spotted it and the arrival of the search part. The corpse was found in his sleeping bag alongside a river and was covered in dirt with his neck wrapped with his bandanna. At first, the media reported True had accidentally fallen into the ravine, but Jalisco's coroner told Televisa network news that the autopsy indicated True had been murdered.

== Investigations ==
True traveled 370 miles from Mexico City to Tuxpan to start his 65 mile trek through the Sierra Madre Occidental, Mexico.

The investigations focused on Juan Chivarra de la Cruz, 28, and Miguel Hernandez de la Cruz, 24, two men of Huichol heritage who were brothers-in-law. After the arrest, the two confessed, but would later recant, initially saying they had killed True for taking unauthorized photographs or that he had trespassed on Huichol lands or that he had shown disrespect to their relatives.

The first of the two autopsies performed on True in Jalisco, Mexico revealed that he was strangled with his own bandanna. The autopsy further revealed signs of torture, which was inconsistent with the confession. The autopsy also uncovered signs that he had been bludgeoned perhaps with a stick. Cuts and bruises all over True's arms could have indicated torture or some kind of defensive wounds. The report concluded that True was dead before he ended up in the deep ravine.

The second autopsy was performed in Mexico City where an FBI forensics expert was to observe the autopsy. Toxicology reports showed that True had a higher than normal blood alcohol level at the time of his death and detected trace amounts of aminovalerico, which is an over-the-counter derivative of a local plant used as a stimulant in the Sierra. True could have used this medication to suppress the effects of high altitude and low temperatures. An injury not located in the first autopsy report was a blow to the back, behind his right lung, which could have caused True to lose consciousness and to stop breathing while his lungs filled with fluid. The report could also be interpreted as a fall caused the blunt trauma. A third forensics report revised the previous two autopsy reports. The report's findings were that True suffered a pulmonary edema which resulted from a head injury and could be interpreted that he was not strangled.

By April 1999, Juan Chivarra told True's former newspaper that they had made statements under the duress of pressure from police.

== Legal proceedings ==
The case against Chivarra and Hernandez changed after Miguel Gatins, an American businessman, intervened on their behalf. Gatins lived in Atlanta, as his father had been a hotelier there, and then he resided in Guadalajara. After taking an interest in the case, Gatins was convinced based on contradictions in their interrogation and in the autopsies that there was no conclusive proof that murder had been committed. Gatins spent US $30,000 and worked through his philanthropic organization, Latin American Institute of Philanthropy, to acquire representation to make motions on their behalf. The head of a social service prepared the case. A member of the human rights commission in Jalisco wrote in support of the Huichol men. In 2001, lawyers presented a case to judges that evidence pointed to falling and after a closed hearing to review the evidence, judges released the two men. In May 2002, the case went to the state appeals court. Those judges reversed the acquittal and handed down a 13-year sentence, but because of further appeals, the now convicted men remained free while their appeal could run its course. In February 2003, the federal appeals court found fault with a judge in the lower court that had remained on the case after a request for recusal and so the case was sent back to the state and the convictions were also scrapped.

In November 2003, Gatins reversed his decision to support the men on the basis that new evidence had convinced him of the men's guilt. By 2004, the state appeals court had reinstated the conviction, sentenced the men to 20 years in absentia, and also set a sum for damages; however, the men had disappeared after their 2001 release. The case currently remains unresolved until the two men can be located.

== Reactions ==
Mexican President Ernesto Zedillo first offered government resources to find True after he had disappeared and later ordered an investigation into the murder the U.S. reporter. After Zedillo, President Vicente Fox intervened in support of the family. Miguel Gatins and Robert Rivard questioned whether the Mexican justice system worked. While Gatins originally supported the two Huichol men, he argued that Mexican justice did work when it freed them, while Rivard made the case that justice would not be served if guilty parties were freed. Martha True said she had been disappointed by the closed process and was surprised when the 2001 release. By the end of 2003, Gatins had switched his support to Rivard and True's position.

== Awards ==
- Philip True Awards: After his murder, the San Antonio Express-News created an internal award for staff whereby the paper's journalists are judged by their peers in categories.

== Book ==
Robert Rivard, Trail of Feathers: Searching for Philip True: A Reporter's Murder in Mexico and His Editor's Search for Justice New York: Public Affairs, 2005.

== See also ==
- List of journalists killed in Mexico
- Ambrose Bierce
- Brad Will
- Disappearance of Zane Plemmons
- Armando Montaño
