= Armando González (Paraguayan footballer) =

Paraguayan footballer

Personal information
- Place of birth: Paraguay
- Position: Midfielder

Senior career*
| Years | Team | Apps | (Gls) |
- Club Guaraní

International career
- Paraguay
- * Club domestic league appearances and goals

Armando González was a Paraguayan football midfielder who played for Paraguay in the 1950 FIFA World Cup. He also played for Club Guaraní. González is deceased.
