= Atilio López =

Paraguayan footballer and coach (1925-2016)

Personal information
- Full name: Higinio Atilio López Riveros
- Date of birth: 5 February 1925
- Place of birth: Villarrica, Paraguay
- Date of death: 14 July 2016 (aged 91)
- Position: Striker

Senior career*
Years	Team	Apps	(Gls)
1943–1950	Guaraní	?	(?)
1950–1952	Boca Juniors (Cali)	?	(?)
1953	Atlético Chalaco	?	(13)
1953–1956	Atlético Madrid	?	(?)
1956	Atlético Chalaco	?	(1)
1957	Grêmio	?	(0)
1958–1961	Aucas	?	(?)
1962	Nacional (Paraguay)	?	(?)
1962	Pettirossi (Encarnación)		

International career
1950–1953	Paraguay	12	(5)
Medal record
Representing Paraguay
Copa América
Winner	1953 Peru
- * Club domestic league appearances and goals

Higinio Atilio López Riveros (5 February 1925 – 14 July 2016) was a Paraguayan football striker and coach. He was part of the Paraguay national football team that participated in the 1950 FIFA World Cup and the 1953 Copa America, which was eventually won by Paraguay.

== Club career ==
At the club level, he played for teams like Nacional and Club Guaraní of Paraguay, Boca Juniors de Cali of Colombia, Atlético Madrid of Spain, Atlético Chalaco of Peru, and Atahualpa and Aucas of Ecuador.

== International career ==
On 30 April 1950, López made his international debut for Paraguay during a friendly against Uruguay, scoring once in the 3-2 win.

López was selected in Paraguay’s squad for the 1950 FIFA World Cup, playing Paraguay’s two games against Sweden and Italy. and scoring one goal against Sweden.

He was also in Paraguay’s squad for the 1953 South American Championship, playing all seven games and scoring three goals. During the final against Brazil, he played his 12th and last cap and scored his 5th and last goal with Paraguay.

== As coach ==
After retiring from football as a player, López managed Paraguayan First Division teams like Sportivo Luqueño, Guaraní and Club Libertad. He was also in charge of the youth divisions of several teams around the country.

== Titles ==
Season	Team	Title
1949	Guaraní	Paraguayan 1st division
1953	Paraguay	Copa America
1959	Aucas	Ecuador Championship
