= Manuel Gavilán =

Paraguayan footballer (1920-2010)

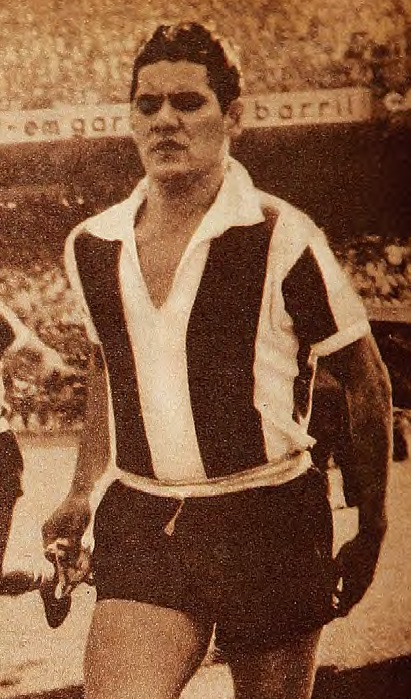

Personal information
- Date of birth: 30 November 1920
- Place of birth: Paraguay
- Date of death: 8 March 2010 (aged 89)
- Position: Defender

Senior career*
Years	Team	Apps	(Gls)
1941-1958	Club Libertad		

International career
1947-1954	Paraguay	32	(1)
Medal record
Representing Paraguay
Copa América
Winner	1953 Peru
- * Club domestic league appearances and goals

Manuel Gavilán (30 November 1920 — 8 March 2010) was a Paraguayan football defender who played for Paraguay in the 1950 FIFA World Cup and the 1953 South American Championship which was won by Paraguay. He also played for Club Libertad.

== International career ==
Gavilán was selected in Paraguay’s squad for the 1947 South American Championship and played in all seven games. The game against Argentina on 2 December was his first cap with Paraguay.

He played six games in the 1949 South American Championship.

Gavilán was part of Paraguay’s squad for the 1950 World Cup and played Paraguay’s two games against Sweden and Italy.

He was also selected in Paraguay’s squad for the 1953 South American Championship, played all seven games and scored in the decisive final against Brazil national football team, his only goal with the national team, as Paraguay won the competition.

His 32nd and last cap with Paraguay was on 21 March 1954 against Brazil, for a 1954 FIFA World Cup qualification game.
