= Mario Mena =

Bolivian footballer (born 1927)

Personal information
- Full name: Mario Mena Lema
- Date of birth: 28 February 1927
- Place of birth: Tarija, Bolivia
- Position: Forward

Senior career*
Years	Team	Apps	(Gls)
- Club Bolívar

International career
- Bolivia
- * Club domestic league appearances and goals

Mario Mena Lema (born 28 February 1927, date of death unknown) was a Bolivian football forward who played for Bolivia in the 1950 FIFA World Cup. He also played for Club Bolívar. Mena is deceased.
