= Omar Méndez =

Uruguayan footballer (born 1934)

Personal information
- Full name: Omar Pedro Méndez Gulvenzu
- Date of birth: 7 August 1934 (age 92)
- Place of birth: Uruguay
- Height: 1.73 m (5 ft 8 in)
- Position: Forward

Senior career*
Years	Team	Apps	(Gls)
- Club Nacional de Football

International career
1953–1957	Uruguay	10	(2)
- * Club domestic league appearances and goals

Omar Pedro Méndez Gulvenzu (born 7 August 1934) is a Uruguayan football forward who played for Uruguay in the 1954 FIFA World Cup. He also played for Club Nacional de Football and he succeeded in Ferro Carril Oeste, in Argentina in 1958.
