= Carlos Romero (footballer, born 1927) =

Uruguayan footballer

Personal information
- Full name: Carlos Romero
- Date of birth: September 7, 1927
- Place of birth: Uruguay
- Date of death: July 28, 1999 (aged 71)
- Position: Forward

Senior career*
Years	Team	Apps	(Gls)
1950–1956	Danubio		

International career
1950–1956	Uruguay	12	(4)
Medal record
Representing Uruguay
FIFA World Cup
Winner	1950 Brazil
- * Club domestic league appearances and goals

Carlos Romero (7 September 1927 – 28 July 1999) was a Uruguayan footballer, who played for Danubio.

For the Uruguay national football team, he was part of the 1950 FIFA World Cup winning team, but did not play in any matches in the tournament. In total he earned 11 caps and scored 4 goals for Uruguay.
