= Gilberto Muñoz =

Chilean footballer (1923-1998)

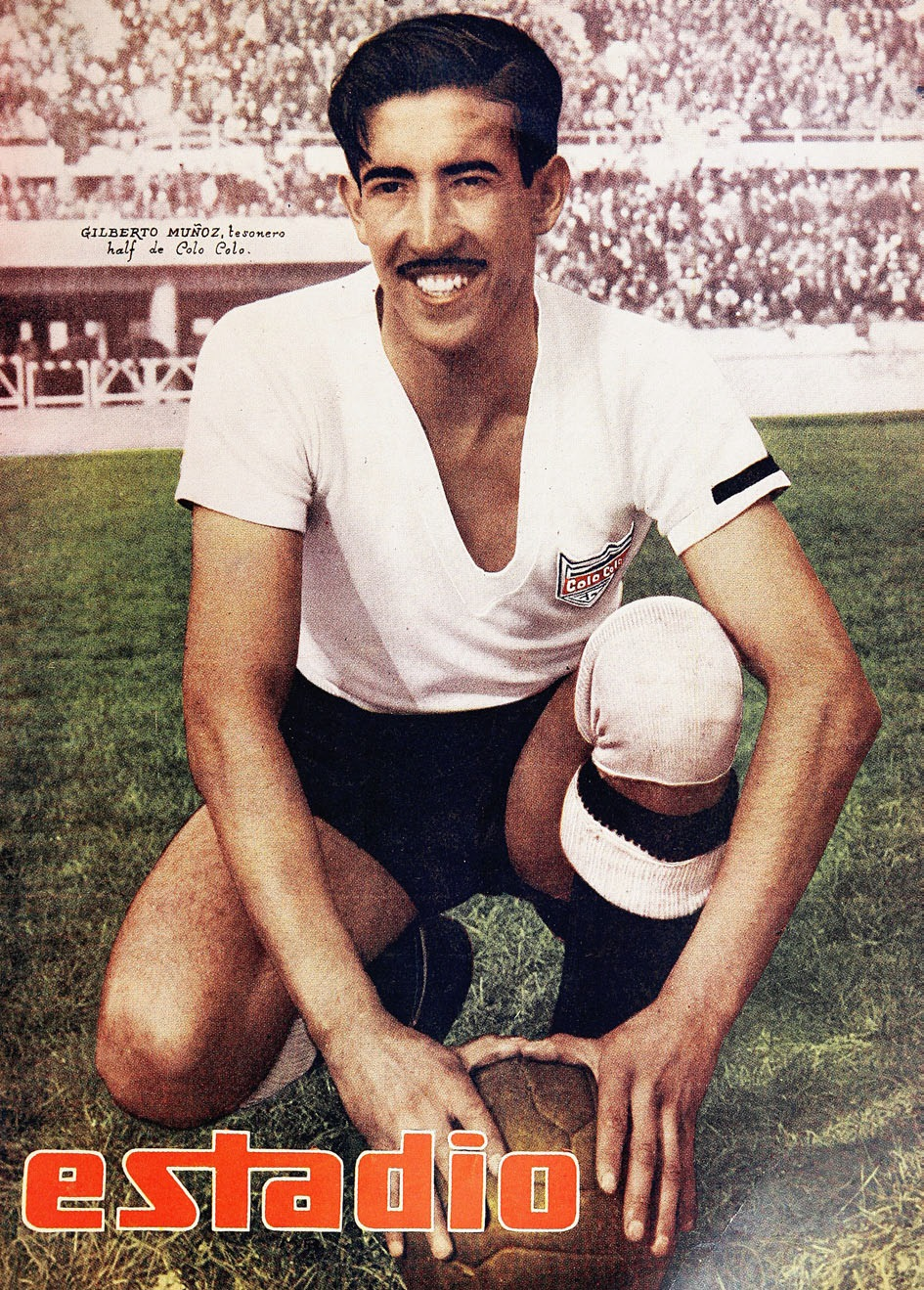

Personal information
- Date of birth: 3 January 1923
- Place of birth: Santiago, Chile
- Date of death: 18 December 1998 (aged 75)
- Position: Midfielder

Senior career*
Years	Team	Apps	(Gls)
- Colo-Colo

International career
1949	Chile	6	(0)
- * Club domestic league appearances and goals

Gilberto Muñoz (3 January 1923 – 18 December 1998) was a Chilean footballer. He played in six matches for the Chile national football team in 1949. He was also part of Chile's squad for the 1949 South American Championship.
