= Ipojucan =

Brazilian footballer (1926–1978)

Personal information
- Full name: Ipojucan Lins de Araújo
- Date of birth: 3 June 1926
- Place of birth: Maceió, Brazil
- Date of death: 19 June 1978 (aged 52)
- Height: 1.90 m (6 ft 3 in)
- Position: Forward

Senior career*
Years	Team	Apps	(Gls)
1946–1954	Vasco da Gama		
1955–1958	Portuguesa		

International career
1952–1955	Brazil	8	(1)
- * Club domestic league appearances and goals

Ipojucan Lins de Araújo (3 June 1926 – 19 June 1978) was a Brazilian footballer who played as a forward. He made eight appearances for the Brazil national team from 1952 to 1955. He was also part of Brazil's squad for the 1953 South American Championship.
