= Antonio Valencia (Bolivian footballer) =

Bolivian footballer (born 1925)

Personal information
- Full name: Antonio José Valencia
- Date of birth: 10 May 1925
- Place of birth: Oruro, Bolivia
- Position: Midfielder

Senior career*
Years	Team	Apps	(Gls)
- Club Bolívar

International career
- Bolivia
- * Club domestic league appearances and goals

Antonio José Valencia (born 10 May 1925, date of death unknown) was a Bolivian football midfielder who played for Bolivia in the 1950 FIFA World Cup. He also played for Club Bolívar. Valencia is deceased.
