= René Cabrera =

Bolivian footballer (born 1925)

Personal information
- Date of birth: 21 October 1925
- Position: Midfielder

Senior career*
Years	Team	Apps	(Gls)
- Jorge Wilstermann

International career
- Bolivia
- * Club domestic league appearances and goals

René Cabrera (born 21 October 1925, date of death unknown) was a Bolivian football midfielder who was a non-playing squad member of Bolivia in the 1950 FIFA World Cup. He also played for Club Jorge Wilstermann. Cabrera is deceased.
