= 1953 South American Championship =

Football tournament

Tournament details
- Host country: Peru
- Dates: 22 February – 1 April 1953
- Teams: 7
- Venue(s): Estadio Nacional, Lima

Final positions
- Champions: Paraguay (1st title)
- Runners-up: Brazil
- Third place: Uruguay
- Fourth place: Chile

Tournament statistics
- Matches played: 22
- Goals scored: 67 (3.05 per match)
- Top scorer: (Chile) Francisco Molina (7 goals)

The 1953 South American Championship (Spanish: Campeonato Sudamericano 1953, Portuguese: Campeonato Sul-Americano de 1953) was the 22nd international association football championship for members of the Confederación Sudamericana de Fútbol (CONMEBOL). Hosted by Peru, the competition ran from 22 February – 1 April 1953 and was contested by the national teams of Bolivia, Brazil, Chile, Ecuador, Paraguay, Peru and Uruguay.

After the completion of the round-robin tournament, Brazil and Paraguay were tied level on points. With no tiebreaking criteria, a play-offs was to be organised to decide the champion. Paraguay won the play-off 3–2 to win the championships for the first time.

== Background ==
In 1910, the Asociación del Fútbol Argentino (AFA) organised a tournament to mark the 100th anniversary of the May Revolution. The Copa Centenario Revolución de Mayo was contested by the national teams of Argentina, Chile and Uruguay and is considered to be a precursor to the South American Championship. Six years later, the AFA organised a second tournament, this time to celebrate the centenary of the Argentine Declaration of Independence. Alongside the three who had contested the Copa Centenario Revolución de Mayo, Brazil were invited to compete and the South American Championship was born. During the competition, the four associations of the competing teams met on 9 July 1916 and founded the Confederación Sudamericana de Fútbol (CONMEBOL).

Brazil were the defending champions having won the 1949 edition after defeating Paraguay 7–0 in the championship play-off. Argentina were the most successful team in the history of the competition having won the trophy on nine occasions.

Argentina and Colombia withdrew prior to the start of the competition so only seven of the nine CONMEBOL members would compete.

Originally, the competition was to be held in Paraguay but the Asociación Paraguaya de Fútbol (APF) claimed that they did not have a stadium capable of holding the tournament. As a result, it was moved to be played in Peru. The competition had never previously been held in Paraguay and wouldn't be held in the country until the 1999 edition.

== Format ==
The tournament was played as a round-robin where each team would play all of the others once. The winner would be decided by the total number of points obtained across all matches played. Should two or more teams be tied with the greatest number of points, a play-off would be organised to decide the winner.

=== Participants ===
- Bolivia
- Brazil
- Chile
- Ecuador
- Paraguay
- Peru
- Uruguay

== Venue ==
All matches were held at the Estadio Nacional in Lima.

Lima
Estadio Nacional
Capacity: 40,000
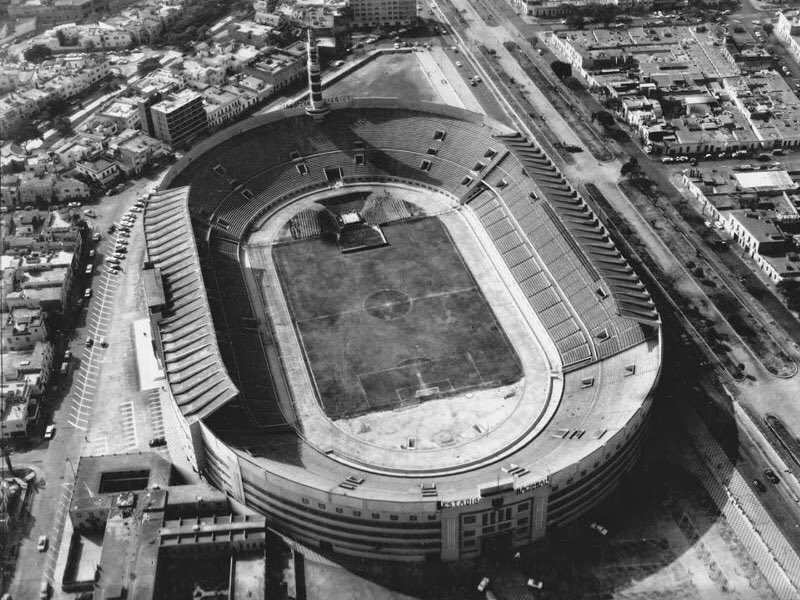

== Summary ==
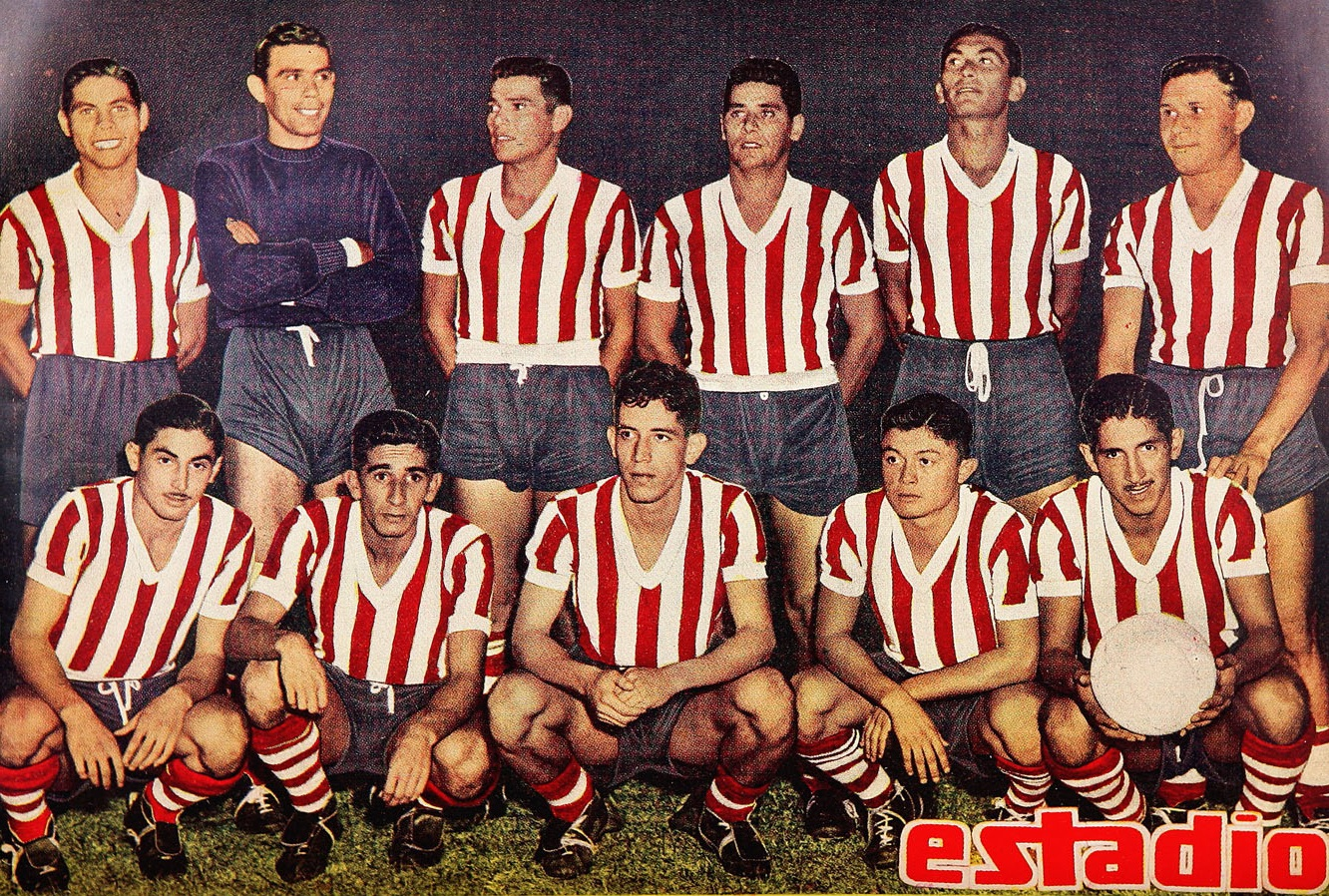

The competition began on 22 February when Bolivia defeated hosts Peru 1–0. Three days later, Paraguay won 3–0 against Chile and Uruguay defeated Bolivia 2–0. On 28 February, Peru won 1–0 against Ecuador. The following day, four goals from Julinho helped defending champions Brazil to an 8–1 win against Bolivia in their first match of the tournament and a Francisco Molina hat-trick saw Chile defeat Uruguay 3–2. On 4 March, Paraguay and Ecuador played out a goalless draw and Chile also drew 0–0 with Peru. Four days later, Bolivia and Ecuador drew 1–1 and Peru drew 2–2 with Paraguay. However, the match was subsequently awarded to Peru for unsportsmanlike behaviour after Paraguay made one more substitution than allowed. Paraguay's Milner Ayala was also banned for three years after kicking the referee.

On 12 March, Paraguay drew 2–2 with Uruguay and Brazil defeated Ecuador 2–0. With just over half the matches played, Peru were top of the table with five points, one ahead of Brazil and Paraguay.

Three days later, Brazil won 1–0 against Uruguay to go top of the table. On 16 March, Paraguay defeated Bolivia 2–1 to pull level with Brazil at the top. Three days later, Chile defeated Ecuador 3–0 and Peru won 1–0 against Brazil to go back into first place. On 23 March, Brazil won 3–2 against Chile which saw them leapfrog Peru ahead of the final round of fixtures and Uruguay defeated Ecuador 6–0.

Four days later, Paraguay came from behind to defeat Brazil 2–1 and leave both teams level on eight points, one ahead of Peru who had one game left to play. On 28 March, the match between Chile and Bolivia was suspended after 66 minutes with the score tied at 2–2. It was subsequently awarded to Chile due to unsportsmanlike behaviour from Bolivia. In the final match Uruguay defeated Peru 3–0 to end any chance Peru had of winning the competition. As a result, with Brazil and Paraguay tied on points, a play-off was arranged to decide the winner.

On 1 April, in a replay of the play-off from the previous edition, Paraguay gained revenge on Brazil by winning 3–2 to win the competition for the first time.

== Table ==
Pos	Team	Pld	W	D	L	GF	GA	GD	Pts	Qualification
1	Brazil	6	4	0	2	15	6	+9	8	Qualification for play-off
1	Paraguay	6	3	2	1	11	6	+5	8	Qualification for play-off
3	Chile	6	3	1	2	10	10	0	7	
3	Peru	6	3	1	2	4	6	−2	7	
3	Uruguay	6	3	1	2	15	6	+9	7	
6	Bolivia	6	1	1	4	6	15	−9	3	
7	Ecuador	6	0	2	4	1	13	−12	2	

== Results ==
22 February 1953

Bolivia	1–0	Peru
Ugarte 53'

Estadio Nacional, Lima
Attendance: 50,000
Referee: George Rhoden (England)

25 February 1953

Paraguay	3–0	Chile
Fernández 54', 75'; Berni 78'

Estadio Nacional, Lima
Attendance: 45,000
Referee: Richard Maddison (England)
25 February 1953

Uruguay	2–0	Bolivia
Puente 11'; Carlos Romero 88'

Estadio Nacional, Lima
Attendance: 45,000
Referee: Charles Dean (England)

28 February 1953

Peru	1–0	Ecuador
Gómez Sánchez 78'

Estadio Nacional, Lima
Attendance: 50,000
Referee: George Rhoden (England)

1 March 1953

Brazil	8–1	Bolivia
Julinho 18', 20', 42', 52'; Francisco Rodrigues 25', 44'; Pinga 39', 60'		Ugarte 73' (pen.)

Estadio Nacional, Lima
Attendance: 45,000
Referee: Richard Maddison (England)
1 March 1953

Chile	3–2	Uruguay
Molina 5', 55', 67'		Morel 70'; Balseiro 81'

Estadio Nacional, Lima
Attendance: 45,000
Referee: Charles Dean (England)

4 March 1953

Paraguay	0–0	Ecuador

Estadio Nacional, Lima
Attendance: 45,000
Referee: Mário Vianna (Brazil)
4 March 1953

Chile	0–0	Peru

Estadio Nacional, Lima
Attendance: 45,000
Referee: Richard Maddison (England)

8 March 1953

Bolivia	1–1	Ecuador
Alcón 25'		Guzmán 6'

Estadio Nacional, Lima
Attendance: 45,000
Referee: Charles McKenna (England)
8 March 1953

Peru	2–2 (awarded)	Paraguay
Gómez Sánchez 47'; Terry 53'		Fernández 36'; Berni 77'

Estadio Nacional, Lima
Attendance: 45,000
Referee: Richard Maddison (England)

12 March 1953

Paraguay	2–2	Uruguay
Atilio López 5'; Berni 52'		Balseiro 36', 55'

Estadio Nacional, Lima
Attendance: 35,000
Referee: David Gregory (England)
12 March 1953

Brazil	2–0	Ecuador
Ademir 18'; Cláudio 55'

Estadio Nacional, Lima
Attendance: 35,000
Referee: Richard Maddison (England)

15 March 1953

Brazil	1–0	Uruguay
Ipojucan 87'

Estadio Nacional, Lima
Attendance: 45,000
Referee: Charles McKenna (England)

16 March 1953

Paraguay	2–1	Bolivia
Angel Romero 17'; Berni 22'		Ramon Santos 76'

Estadio Nacional, Lima
Attendance: 15,000
Referee: David Gregory (England)

19 March 1953

Chile	3–0	Ecuador
Molina 33', 47'; Cremaschi 70'

Estadio Nacional, Lima
Attendance: 55,000
Referee: Richard Maddison (England)
19 March 1953

Peru	1–0	Brazil
Navarrete 51'

Estadio Nacional, Lima
Attendance: 55,000
Referee: Charles McKenna (England)

23 March 1953

Brazil	3–2	Chile
Julinho 1'; Zizinho 53'; Baltazar 70'		Molina 62', 76'

Estadio Nacional, Lima
Attendance: 35,000
Referee: Richard Maddison (England)
23 March 1953

Uruguay	6–0	Ecuador
Méndez 12'; Puente 51'; Peláez 58'; Morel 60'; Carlos Romero 86'; Balseiro 88'

Estadio Nacional, Lima
Attendance: 35,000
Referee: David Gregory (England)

27 March 1953

Paraguay	2–1	Brazil
Atilio López 49'; León 89'		Nílton Santos 12'

Estadio Nacional, Lima
Attendance: 35,000
Referee: Charles Dean (England)

28 March 1953

Chile	2–2 (awarded)	Bolivia
Meléndez 28'; Díaz Carmona 52'		Ramón Santos 15'; Alcón 49'

Estadio Nacional, Lima
Attendance: 45,000
Referee: Richard Maddison (England)
28 March 1953

Uruguay	3–0	Peru
Peláez 23', 67'; Carlos Romero 71'

Estadio Nacional, Lima
Attendance: 45,000
Referee: Mário Vianna (Brazil)

=== Play-off ===
1 April 1953

Paraguay	3–2	Brazil
Atilio López 14'; Gavilán 17'; Fernández 41'		Baltazar 56', 65'

Estadio Nacional, Lima
Attendance: 35,000
Referee: Charles Dean (England)

== Goalscorers ==
There were 67 goals scored in 22 matches, for an average of 3.05 goals per match.

7 goals

- (Chile) Molina

5 goals

- (Brazil) Julinho

4 goals

- (Paraguay) Berni
- (Paraguay) Fernández
- (Uruguay) Balseiro

3 goals

- (Brazil) Baltazar
- (Paraguay) Atilio López
- (Uruguay) Carlos Romero
- (Uruguay) Peláez

2 goals

- (Bolivia) Alcón
- (Bolivia) Ramón Santos
- (Bolivia) Ugarte
- (Brazil) Pinga
- (Brazil) Francisco Rodrigues
- (Peru) Gómez Sánchez
- (Uruguay) Morel
- (Uruguay) Puente

1 goal

- (Brazil) Ademir
- (Brazil) Cláudio
- (Brazil) Ipojucan
- (Brazil) Nílton Santos
- (Brazil) Zizinho
- (Chile) Cremaschi
- (Chile) Díaz Carmona
- (Chile) Meléndez
- (Ecuador) Guzmán
- (Paraguay) Angel Romero
- (Paraguay) León
- (Paraguay) Gavilán
- (Peru) Navarrete
- (Peru) Terry
- (Uruguay) Méndez
