= 1957 South American Championship squads =

List of footballers

These are the squads for the countries that played in the 1957 South American Championship. The participating countries were Argentina, Brazil, Chile, Colombia, Ecuador, Peru and Uruguay. Bolivia and Paraguay withdrew from the tournament. The teams plays in a single round-robin tournament, earning two points for a win, one point for a draw, and zero points for a loss.

== Argentina ==
Head Coach: (Argentina) Guillermo Stábile

No.	Pos.	Player	Date of birth (age)	Caps	Goals	Club
	FW	Antonio Valentín Angelillo	5 September 1937 (aged 19)	4	2	(Argentine Football Association) Boca Juniors
	MF	Jorge Benegas	10 April 1923 (aged 33)	5	0	(Argentine Football Association) San Lorenzo
	FW	Roberto Brookes	1 January 1938 (aged 19)	0	0	(Argentine Football Association) Chacarita Juniors
	FW	Juan Alberto Castro	13 July 1934 (aged 22)	0	0	(Argentine Football Association) Rosario Central
	FW	Oreste Corbatta	11 March 1936 (aged 20)	5	1	(Argentine Football Association) Racing Club
	MF	Osvaldo Héctor Cruz	29 May 1931 (aged 25)	13	1	(Argentine Football Association) Independiente
	MF	Héctor De Bourgoing	23 July 1934 (aged 22)	2	0	(Argentine Football Association) Tigre
	DF	Pedro Rodolfo Dellacha	9 July 1926 (aged 30)	18	0	(Argentine Football Association) Racing Club
	GK	Rogelio Antonio Domínguez	9 March 1931 (aged 25)	14	0	(Argentine Football Association) Racing Club
	DF	Juan Giménez	16 February 1927 (aged 30)	3	0	(Argentine Football Association) Racing Club
	MF	Juan Hector Guidi	4 July 1930 (aged 26)	11	0	(Argentine Football Association) Lanús
	FW	Miguel Juárez	29 September 1931 (aged 25)	0	0	(Argentine Football Association) Rosario Central
	MF	David Iñigo	16 June 1934 (aged 22)	0	0	(Argentine Football Association) San Lorenzo
	MF	Oscar Mantegari	20 October 1928 (aged 28)	1	0	(Argentine Football Association) River Plate
	FW	Humberto Maschio	20 February 1937 (aged 20)	5	3	(Argentine Football Association) Racing Club
	MF	Federico Pizarro	1 January 1927 (aged 30)	5	0	(Argentine Football Association) San Lorenzo
	GK	Antonio Roma	13 July 1932 (aged 24)	2	0	(Argentine Football Association) Ferro Carril Oeste
	DF	Néstor Raul Rossi	10 May 1925 (aged 31)	9	0	(Argentine Football Association) River Plate
	FW	José Sanfilippo	4 May 1935 (aged 21)	1	1	(Argentine Football Association) San Lorenzo
	DF	Ángel Schandlein	12 August 1930 (aged 26)	3	0	(Argentine Football Association) Gimnasia y Esgrima (LP)
	FW	Omar Sívori	2 October 1935 (aged 21)	13	6	(Argentine Football Association) River Plate
	DF	Federico Vairo	27 January 1930 (aged 27)	21	1	(Argentine Football Association) River Plate

== Brazil ==
Head Coach: (Brazil) Osvaldo Brandão

No.	Pos.	Player	Date of birth (age)	Caps	Goals	Club
	DF	Hilderaldo Bellini	7 June 1930 (aged 26)	0	0	(Brazilian Football Confederation) Vasco da Gama
	GK	Carlos Castilho	27 November 1927 (aged 29)	17	0	(Brazilian Football Confederation) Fluminense
	FW	Cláudio	18 July 1922 (aged 34)	11	5	(Brazilian Football Confederation) São Paulo
	MF	Didi	8 October 1928 (aged 28)	29	5	(Brazilian Football Confederation) Fluminense
	MF	Dino Sani	23 May 1932 (aged 24)	0	0	(Brazilian Football Confederation) São Paulo
	DF	Djalma Santos	23 February 1929 (aged 28)	38	2	(Brazilian Football Confederation) Portuguesa
	GK	Édgar	26 August 1932 (aged 24)	0	0	(Brazilian Football Confederation) América Mineiro
	DF	Édson	19 March 1933 (aged 23)	7	0	(Brazilian Football Confederation) América-RJ
	FW	Evaristo	22 July 1933 (aged 23)	5	0	(Brazilian Football Confederation) Flamengo
	FW	Garrincha	28 October 1933 (aged 23)	1	0	(Brazilian Football Confederation) Botafogo
	GK	Gilmar	22 August 1930 (aged 26)	19	0	(Brazilian Football Confederation) Corinthians
	FW	Índio	1 March 1931 (aged 26)	1	1	(Brazilian Football Confederation) Flamengo
	FW	Joel	23 November 1931 (aged 25)	1	0	(Brazilian Football Confederation) Flamengo
	DF	Nílton Santos	16 May 1925 (aged 31)	36	1	(Brazilian Football Confederation) Botafogo
	DF	Olavo	9 November 1927 (aged 29)	1	0	(Brazilian Football Confederation) Corinthians
	DF	Oreco	13 June 1932 (aged 24)	5	0	(Brazilian Football Confederation) Internacional
	DF	Paulinho	15 April 1932 (aged 24)	6	1	(Brazilian Football Confederation) Vasco da Gama
	FW	Pepe	25 February 1935 (aged 22)	3	2	(Brazilian Football Confederation) Santos
	MF	Roberto Belangero	28 June 1928 (aged 28)	7	0	(Brazilian Football Confederation) Corinthians
	MF	Zito	8 August 1932 (aged 24)	2	0	(Brazilian Football Confederation) Santos
	FW	Zizinho	14 September 1921 (aged 35)	48	28	(Brazilian Football Confederation) Bangu
	DF	Zózimo	19 June 1932 (aged 24)	19	2	(Brazilian Football Confederation) Bangu

== Chile ==
Head Coach: (Argentina) José Salerno

No.	Pos.	Player	Date of birth (age)	Caps	Goals	Club
	FW	Raúl Águila	16 September 1930 (aged 26)	1	0	(Football Federation of Chile) Audax Italiano
	MF	Rodolfo Almeyda	5 July 1923 (aged 33)	19	0	(Football Federation of Chile) Palestino
	DF	Gonzalo Carrasco	28 July 1935 (aged 21)	0	0	(Football Federation of Chile) Green Cross
	DF	Isaac Carrasco	12 August 1928 (aged 28)	21	0	(Football Federation of Chile) Colo Colo
	MF	Ramiro Cortés	27 April 1931 (aged 25)	38	1	(Football Federation of Chile) Audax Italiano
	DF	Carlos Cubillos	25 December 1929 (aged 27)	11	0	(Football Federation of Chile) Unión Española
	GK	Misael Escuti	20 December 1928 (aged 28)	15	0	(Football Federation of Chile) Colo Colo
	FW	Sergio Espinoza	25 December 1928 (aged 28)	4	0	(Football Federation of Chile) Audax Italiano
	FW	José Fernández	23 February 1928 (aged 29)	14	1	(Football Federation of Chile) Palestino
	MF	Daniel Morales	23 April 1928 (aged 28)	1	0	(Football Federation of Chile) Magallanes
	GK	Francisco Nitsche	4 November 1930 (aged 26)	0	0	(Football Federation of Chile) Unión Española
	MF	Mario Ortiz	28 January 1936 (aged 21)	4	0	(Football Federation of Chile) Palestino
	DF	Caupolicán Peña	15 September 1930 (aged 26)	2	0	(Football Federation of Chile) Colo Colo
	FW	Jesús Picó	20 April 1935 (aged 21)	0	0	(Football Federation of Chile) Santiago Wanderers
	FW	Andrés Prieto	19 December 1928 (aged 28)	13	8	(Football Federation of Chile) Universidad Católica
	FW	Jaime Ramírez	14 August 1931 (aged 25)	18	4	(Football Federation of Chile) Colo Colo
	FW	George Robledo	14 April 1926 (aged 30)	23	8	(Football Federation of Chile) Colo Colo
	FW	Leonel Sánchez	25 April 1936 (aged 20)	11	2	(Football Federation of Chile) Universidad de Chile
	FW	Carlos Tello	28 March 1929 (aged 27)	10	2	(Football Federation of Chile) Audax Italiano
	DF	Mario Torres	20 June 1931 (aged 25)	3	0	(Football Federation of Chile) Audax Italiano
	MF	Sergio Valdés	9 March 1933 (aged 23)	0	0	(Football Federation of Chile) Magallanes
	FW	Carlos Verdejo	12 August 1928 (aged 28)	0	0	(Football Federation of Chile) Deportes La Serena

== Colombia ==
Head Coach: (Colombia) Pedro López

No.	Pos.	Player	Date of birth (age)	Caps	Goals	Club
—	DF	Faustino Abadía		0	0	(Colombian Football Federation) América de Cali
—	MF	Humberto Álvarez	13 June 1929 (aged 27)	0	0	(Colombian Football Federation) Atlético Nacional
—	FW	Julio Andrade		0	0	(Colombian Football Federation) Cúcuta Deportivo
—	FW	Julio Aragón	18 July 1927 (aged 29)	0	0	(Colombian Football Federation) América de Cali
—	FW	Carlos Arango	31 January 1928 (aged 29)	6	1	(Colombian Football Federation) Santa Fe
—	GK	Ingerman Benítez		0	0	(Colombian Football Federation) América de Cali
—	FW	Alejandro Carrillo	22 February 1931 (aged 26)	0	0	(Colombian Football Federation) Atlético Quindío
—	DF	Ricardo Díaz	7 August 1932 (aged 24)	0	0	(Colombian Football Federation) Atlético Quindío
—	DF	Rodolfo Escobar		0	0	(Colombian Football Federation) América de Cali
—	FW	Delio Gamboa	28 January 1936 (aged 21)	0	0	(Colombian Football Federation) Atlético Nacional
—	FW	Jaime Gutiérrez	28 February 1930 (aged 27)	0	0	(Colombian Football Federation) Atlético Quindío
—	FW	Guillermo Mendoza		0	0	(Colombian Football Federation) América de Cali
—	FW	Lauro Mosquera		0	0	(Colombian Football Federation) Independiente Medellín
—	MF	Luis Alberto Rubio	28 February 1929 (aged 28)	0	0	(Colombian Football Federation) Millonarios
—	GK	Efraín Sánchez	26 February 1926 (aged 31)	11	0	(Colombian Football Federation) Independiente Medellín
—	MF	Israel Sánchez		0	0	(Colombian Football Federation) América de Cali
—	MF	Jaime Silva	10 October 1935 (aged 21)	0	0	(Colombian Football Federation) Santa Fe
—	MF	Rogelio Sinisterra		0	0	(Colombian Football Federation) Deportivo Pereira
—	FW	Luis Alberto Valencia		0	0	(Colombian Football Federation) Deportivo Manizales
—	MF	Roaldo Viáfara	23 May 1926 (aged 30)	0	0	(Colombian Football Federation) América de Cali
—	DF	Francisco Zuluaga	2 February 1929 (aged 28)	0	0	(Colombian Football Federation) Millonarios

== Ecuador ==
Head Coach: (Italy) Eduardo Spandre

No.	Pos.	Player	Date of birth (age)	Caps	Goals	Club
	DF	Raúl Argüello	1 May 1936 (aged 20)	0	0	(Ecuadorian Football Federation) Emelec
	FW	José Balseca	18 July 1933 (aged 23)	10	0	(Ecuadorian Football Federation) Emelec
	GK	Alfredo Bonnard	3 November 1931 (aged 25)	11	0	(Ecuadorian Football Federation) Barcelona
	MF	Julio Caisaguano	12 May 1931 (aged 25)	0	0	(Ecuadorian Football Federation) Unión Valdez
	FW	Enrique Cantos	5 February 1936 (aged 21)	12	1	(Ecuadorian Football Federation) Barcelona
	FW	Clímaco Cañarte	16 September 1933 (aged 23)	4	0	(Ecuadorian Football Federation) Barcelona
	MF	Jaime Galarza	7 November 1934 (aged 22)	0	0	(Ecuadorian Football Federation) Patria
	MF	Rómulo Gómez	6 June 1934 (aged 22)	1	0	(Ecuadorian Football Federation) Emelec
	DF	Honorato Gonzabay	29 December 1929 (aged 27)	4	0	(Ecuadorian Football Federation) Unión Valdez
	FW	Jorge Larraz	12 April 1937 (aged 19)	0	0	(Ecuadorian Football Federation) Emelec
	DF	Luciano Macías	28 May 1935 (aged 21)	0	0	(Ecuadorian Football Federation) Barcelona
	DF	Ezio Martínez	11 September 1930 (aged 26)	0	0	(Ecuadorian Football Federation) Patria
	FW	Isidro Matute	10 May 1930 (aged 26)	5	3	(Ecuadorian Football Federation) Barcelona
	FW	Antonio Colón Merizalde	10 May 1931 (aged 25)	3	0	(Ecuadorian Football Federation) Patria
	FW	Júpiter Miranda	27 December 1926 (aged 30)	0	0	(Ecuadorian Football Federation) Emelec
	FW	Hugo Pardo	17 September 1930 (aged 26)	0	0	(Ecuadorian Football Federation) Unión Valdez
	MF	Daniel Pinto	15 July 1929 (aged 27)	10	0	(Ecuadorian Football Federation) Emelec
	FW	Gonzalo Salcedo	26 April 1935 (aged 21)	0	0	(Ecuadorian Football Federation) Barcelona
	DF	Carlos Sánchez	15 July 1922 (aged 34)	0	0	(Ecuadorian Football Federation) Barcelona
	MF	César Solorzano		2	0	(Ecuadorian Football Federation) Barcelona
	FW	José Vargas	19 December 1924 (aged 32)	12	2	(Ecuadorian Football Federation) Barcelona
	GK	Cipriano Yu Lee	16 September 1933 (aged 23)	0	0	(Ecuadorian Football Federation) Emelec

== Peru ==
Head Coach: (Hungary) György Orth

No.	Pos.	Player	Date of birth (age)	Caps	Goals	Club
	GK	Rafael Asca	24 October 1924 (aged 32)	7	0	(Peruvian Football Federation) Sporting Cristal
	FW	Juan Bassa	26 December 1932 (aged 24)	5	0	(Peruvian Football Federation) Sport Boys
	DF	Víctor Benítez	30 October 1935 (aged 21)	0	0	(Peruvian Football Federation) Alianza Lima
	MF	Luis Calderón	17 June 1929 (aged 27)	22	0	(Peruvian Football Federation) Sport Boys
	FW	Roberto Castillo	29 April 1930 (aged 26)	17	2	(Peruvian Football Federation) Alianza Lima
	DF	Alfredo Cavero	16 April 1923 (aged 33)	0	0	(Peruvian Football Federation) Sporting Cristal
	DF	Guillermo Delgado	11 February 1931 (aged 26)	26	0	(Peruvian Football Federation) Alianza Lima
	GK	Rigoberto Felandro	4 January 1924 (aged 33)	5	0	(Peruvian Football Federation) Sport Boys
	DF	Guillermo Fleming	9 April 1934 (aged 22)	0	0	(Peruvian Football Federation) Deportivo Municipal
	DF	René Gutiérrez		4	0	(Peruvian Football Federation) Universitario de Deportes
	FW	Juan Joya	25 February 1934 (aged 23)	0	0	(Peruvian Football Federation) Alianza Lima
	FW	Carlos Lazón	5 October 1929 (aged 27)	15	0	(Peruvian Football Federation) Alianza Lima
	FW	Valeriano López	4 May 1926 (aged 30)	0	0	(Peruvian Football Federation) Alianza Lima
	MF	Mario Minaya		0	0	(Peruvian Football Federation) Universitario de Deportes
	FW	Máximo Mosquera	8 January 1928 (aged 29)	22	4	(Peruvian Football Federation) Sporting Cristal
	FW	Manuel Rivera	15 May 1922 (aged 34)	6	1	(Peruvian Football Federation) Deportivo Municipal
	MF	Dante Rovai	10 June 1928 (aged 28)	0	0	(Peruvian Football Federation) Sporting Cristal
	FW	Daniel Ruiz	16 September 1933 (aged 23)	0	0	(Peruvian Football Federation) Universitario de Deportes
	DF	Víctor Salas	29 March 1935 (aged 21)	11	0	(Peruvian Football Federation) Universitario de Deportes
	FW	Juan Seminario	22 July 1936 (aged 20)	5	0	(Peruvian Football Federation) Deportivo Municipal
	FW	Alberto Terry	16 May 1929 (aged 27)	12	6	(Peruvian Football Federation) Universitario de Deportes
	FW	Jacinto Villalba	8 February 1924 (aged 33)	1	0	(Peruvian Football Federation) Universitario de Deportes

== Uruguay ==
Head Coach: (Uruguay) Juan López

No.	Pos.	Player	Date of birth (age)	Caps	Goals	Club
	FW	Javier Ambrois	9 May 1932 (aged 24)	15	4	(Uruguayan Football Association) Nacional
	GK	Roger Bernardico	28 July 1935 (aged 21)	0	0	(Uruguayan Football Association) Cerro
	FW	Luis Campero		0	0	(Uruguayan Football Association) Liverpool
	FW	Carlos Carranza	30 November 1928 (aged 28)	13	0	(Uruguayan Football Association) Cerro
	MF	Jesús Mario Castro	22 October 1937 (aged 19)	0	0	(Uruguayan Football Association) Sud América
	DF	Carlos Correa	30 April 1936 (aged 20)	0	0	(Uruguayan Football Association) Danubio
	FW	Ariel Fernández		0	0	(Uruguayan Football Association) Cerro
	DF	Roque Fernández	1927 (29-30)	0	0	(Uruguayan Football Association) Rampla Juniors
	MF	Néstor Gonçalves	27 April 1936 (aged 20)	0	0	(Uruguayan Football Association) Peñarol
	MF	Edgardo González	30 September 1936 (aged 20)	0	0	(Uruguayan Football Association) Liverpool
	MF	José Lescano		1	0	(Uruguayan Football Association) Danubio
	DF	Walter Marichal	18 April 1935 (aged 21)	0	0	(Uruguayan Football Association) Nacional
	FW	Omar Méndez	7 August 1934 (aged 22)	0	0	(Uruguayan Football Association) Nacional
	MF	Luis Alberto Miramontes	15 December 1928 (aged 28)	6	0	(Uruguayan Football Association) Defensor Sporting
	DF	Valentín Percíncula		0	0	(Uruguayan Football Association) Cerro
	FW	Rodolfo Pippo		0	0	(Uruguayan Football Association) Cerro
	FW	Walter Roque	8 May 1937 (aged 19)	5	1	(Uruguayan Football Association) Rampla Juniors
	DF	José Santamaría	31 July 1929 (aged 27)	7	0	(Uruguayan Football Association) Nacional
	FW	José Sasía	27 December 1933 (aged 23)	3	0	(Uruguayan Football Association) Defensor Sporting
	GK	Walter Taibo	7 March 1931 (aged 26)	2	0	(Uruguayan Football Association) Nacional
	DF	Oscar Vilariño		0	0	(Uruguayan Football Association) Cerro
