= Deaths in December 2000 =

The following is a list of notable deaths in December 2000.

Entries for each day are listed alphabetically by surname. A typical entry lists information in the following sequence:

- Name, age, country of citizenship at birth, subsequent country of citizenship (if applicable), reason for notability, cause of death (if known), and reference.

== December 2000 ==
=== 1 ===
- Moses Abramovitz, 88, American economist.
- Robert V. Barron, 67, American TV and film director.
- Horst Bickel, 82, German medical doctor.
- Issy Bloomberg, 70, South African weightlifter and Olympian (1948, 1952).
- Neal Creque, 60, American organist and jazz composer, kidney cancer.
- Peter Denton, 74, Australian pole vaulter and Olympian (1956).
- Jack Hemingway, 77, Canadian-American fly fisherman, writer and son of novelist Ernest Hemingway, complications following heart surgery.
- Jim Olsen, 79, American basketball player.
- Elmer E. Rasmuson, 91, American banker, philanthropist and politician, congestive heart failure.
- Jack Rooney, 76, Australian rugby league footballer.
- Erik Simonsen, 85, Danish Olympic long-distance runner (1952).
- Terry Wilshusen, 51, American baseball player (California Angels).

=== 2 ===
- Chris Antley, 34, American jockey (Racing Hall of Fame) (winner of Kentucky Derby 1991, 1999), drug overdose.
- Gail Fisher, 65, American actress (Mannix), renal failure.
- Rosemarie Frankland, 57, Welsh actress, model and beauty queen, drug overdose.
- Alfonso Barrantes Lingán, 73, Peruvian politician.
- Pete "El Conde" Rodríguez, 67, American salsa singer, heart attack.
- Theodore Ropp, 89, American historian.
- Kurt Schmid, 68, Swiss rower and Olympic medalist (1952, 1960).
- Michael Schumann, 54, (East) German philosophy professor and politician, traffic accident.
- Daniel Singer, 74, Polish-American socialist writer and journalist, lung cancer.
- Emily Wilkens, 83, American fashion designer.
- Ray Young, 62, Australian politician.
- Bibiano Zapirain, 81, Uruguayan football player.
- Bian Zhilin, 89, Chinese poet and literature researcher.

=== 3 ===
- Gwendolyn Brooks, 83, American poet, cancer.
- Hoyt Curtin, 78, American composer and music producer.
- Cletus Fischer, 75, American gridiron football player (New York Giants).
- Jun Fukuda, 77, Japanese film director, cancer.
- Bobby Kottarakkara, 48, Indian actor, heart attack.
- Red Nonnenkamp, 89, American baseball player (Pittsburgh Pirates, Boston Red Sox).
- Hugh Edward Richardson, 94, British diplomat and Tibetologist.
- Miklós Szabó, 91, Hungarian middle-distance runner and Olympian (1936).

=== 4 ===
- Henck Arron, 64, Suriname politician and Prime Minister, cardiac arrest.
- H. C. Artmann, 79, Austrian poet and writer, heart attack.
- Tito Arévalo, 89, Filipino actor and musician.
- Horia Bernea, 62, Romanian painter.
- Miguel Caldés Luis, 30, Cuban baseball player and Olympian (1996, 2000), train collision.
- Ram Bahadur Chettri, 63, Indian football player and Olympian (1960).
- Chhinnalata, 77, Nepalese writer and poet, paralysis.
- Colin Cowdrey, 67, English cricket player, heart attack.
- Austin Davis, 78, American baseball player.
- Vincent M. Fennelly, 80, American film and television producer.
- Gisela Kahn Gresser, 94, American chess player.
- Manuel Licea, 79, Cuban singer, diabetes.
- Joe Nanini, 45, American rock drummer, intracranial aneurysm.

=== 5 ===
- Ahmad Zaidi Adruce, 74, Malaysian governor.
- Ghulam Dastagir Alam, Pakistani theoretical physicist.
- Rupert Charles Barneby, 89, American botanist.
- Dieter Bogatzki, 58, German Olympic middle-distance runner (1964).
- Marie Skodak Crissey, 90, American developmental psychologist.
- Árpád Glatz, 61, Hungarian Olympic basketball player (1960, 1964).
- Matthew Lukwiya, 43, Ugandan physician, ebola virus disease.
- Antonio Sbordone, 68, Italian Olympic diver (1960).
- O. W. Wolters, 85, British academic, historian and author.

=== 6 ===
- Peter Aird, 79, Scottish footballer.
- Donald Angelini, 74, American mobster.
- Thomas Babe, 59, American playwright, lung cancer.
- Gershom Browne, 102, British soldier.
- Thomas F. Darcy, 67, American cartoonist.
- Walter Grauman, 85, American basketball player.
- Daniel Hittle, 50, American serial killer and mass murderer, execution by lethal injection.
- Enrique Anderson Imbert, 90, Argentine novelist and short-story writer.
- Werner Klemperer, 80, German actor (Hogan's Heroes, Judgment at Nuremberg, Houseboat), Emmy winner (1968, 1969), cancer.
- Chrystabel Leighton-Porter, 87, British model.
- Aziz Mian, 58, Pakistani qawwali, complications of hepatitis.
- Umasashi, 85, Indian Bengali film actress.
- Svetozar Vukmanović, 88, Yugoslav and Montenegrin communist politician.

=== 7 ===
- Nilolay Butinov, 85, Soviet and Russian ethnographer.
- Agustin Walfredo Castellanos, 98, American cardiologist.
- Edward Castro, 50, American convicted murderer, execution by lethal injection.
- Vlado Gotovac, 70, Croatian poet and politician, liver cancer.
- Levi Jackson, 74, American football player, first African-American to captain Yale University.
- Toby Low, 1st Baron Aldington, 86, British politician.
- Leszek Podhorodecki, Polish historian.

=== 8 ===
- Gary Bergman, 62, Canadian ice hockey player (Detroit Red Wings, Minnesota North Stars, Kansas City Scouts), cancer.
- Ann T. Bowling, 57, American geneticist, stroke.
- Rae Brown, 87, Canadian actress.
- Philip Davey, 87, English cricketer.
- Julian Dixon, 66, American politician, heart attack.
- Ionatana Ionatana, 62, Prime Minister of Tuvalu (1999 – 2000), heart attack.
- Charles Issawi, 84, Egyptian-American economist and historian.
- Marvin Leath, 69, American politician, member of the United States House of Representatives (1979–1991).
- Milić od Mačve, 66, Serbian painter and artist.
- Tyrone McGriff, 42, American football player (Pittsburgh Steelers), heart attack.
- Lionel Rogosin, 76, American filmmaker.
- Neil Staebler, 95, American politician, Alzheimer's disease.
- Al Timothy, 85, Trinidadian musician, complications from a stroke.

=== 9 ===
- Robert Armitage, 45, South African cricketer, cancer.
- William Bagonza, 40, Ugandan Olympic boxer (1984).
- Ray Burns, 77, British singer.
- Bob Carlson, 87, American college football and college baseball player and coach.
- Eugenio Galvalisi, 85, Uruguayan football player.
- John Hock, 72, American football player (Chicago Cardinals, Los Angeles Rams), lung cancer.
- Marina Koshetz, 88, American opera singer and actress.
- Tyrone McGriff, 42, American football player, heart attack.
- Sachindra Lal Singh, 93, Indian politician, Chief Minister of Tripura.
- Billie Yorke, 89, British tennis player.

=== 10 ===
- José Águas, 70, Portuguese football player.
- Paul Avery, 66, American journalist, pulmonary emphysema.
- Jack Cowan, 73, Canadian football player.
- Dick Healey, 77, Australian politician and sports broadcaster.
- Marius B. Jansen, 78, American academic and historian.
- James T. McHugh, 68, American Roman Catholic prelate, liver and gallbladder cancer.
- Andreas Mouratis, 74, Greek football player and Olympian (1952).
- Tony Mulvihill, 83, Australian politician.
- Willard Nixon, 72, American baseball player (Boston Red Sox).
- Teresa Sterne, 73, American concert pianist and record producer, Lou Gehrig's disease.
- Riley Stewart, 81, American baseball player.
- Marie Windsor, 80, American actress, congestive heart failure.

=== 11 ===
- Kenneth Brinkhous, 92, American pathologist.
- Pauline Curley, 96, American vaudeville and silent film actress, pneumonia.
- Shaista Suhrawardy Ikramullah, 85, Pakistani politician, diplomat and author.
- David Lewis, 84, American actor.
- Jack Liebowitz, 100, American book publisher (DC Comics).
- N. Richard Nash, 87, American dramatist.
- Johannes Virolainen, 86, Finnish politician.
- René Wheeler, 88, French screenwriter and film director.

=== 12 ===
- Red Barkley, 88, American baseball player (St. Louis Browns, Boston Bees, Brooklyn Dodgers).
- Michael D'Asaro Sr., 62, American fencer and Olympian (1960).
- Götz Friedrich, 70, German opera and theatre director.
- Knud W. Jensen, 84, Danish businessman and art collector.
- Rosa King, 61, American jazz and blues musician, heart attack.
- Dorothy Kirby, 80, American golfer.
- Libertad Lamarque, 92, Argentine-Mexican actress and singer, pneumonia.
- George Montgomery, 84, American actor, heart attack.
- J. H. Patel, 70, Indian politician and Chief Minister of Karnataka.
- Doug Peace, 81, Canadian Olympic cyclist (1936).
- Jimmy Scarth, 74, English football player.
- Ndabaningi Sithole, 80, Zimbabwean politician and rival of Robert Mugabe.
- Marius Zwiller, 95, French Olympic swimmer (1924).

=== 13 ===
- Geoffrey Beyts, 92, British Indian Army officer.
- Roy Anthony Bridge, 79, Jamaican Olympic sports shooter (1960, 1964).
- Milt Crain, 78, American football fullback.
- Pierre Demargne, 97, French historian and archaeologist.
- Clarence Dybvig, 81, American politician, cancer.
- Aharon Harel, 68, Israeli politician.
- Jake Jones, 80, American baseball player (Chicago White Sox, Boston Red Sox).
- Erhard Krack, 69, German politician and mayor of East Berlin.
- Chen Zhen, 45, Chinese-French conceptual artist, cancer.

=== 14 ===
- Ventura Alonzo, 95, Mexican-born American musician.
- Johan Asker, 85, Swedish Olympic equestrian (1956).
- Francisco Cano Consuegra, 45, Spanish politician, explosion.
- J. H. Cottrell Jr., 83, American politician.
- Enoch Dumbutshena, 80, Zimbabwean judge, liver cancer.
- Allan Howe, 73, American politician, member of the United States House of Representatives (1975–1977).
- Roger Judrin, 91, French writer and literary critic.
- Myroslav Ivan Lubachivsky, 82, Ukrainian Catholic bishop.
- John Mahnken, 78, American basketball player.
- Pavel Plotnikov, 80, Soviet air force general.
- Uldis Pūcītis, 63, Latvian actor, scriptwriter and film director, pulmonary embolism.
- Al Vincent, 93, American baseball player, manager, coach and scout.

=== 15 ===
- Trevor Adams, 54, British actor, cancer.
- George Alcock, 88, English astronomer.
- Z. W. Birnbaum, 97, Polish-American mathematician and statistician.
- Jozef Boons, 57, Belgian racing cyclist and Olympian (1964), struck by a truck.
- Haris Brkić, 26, Yugoslav basketball player, shot.
- James Brockway, 84, English poet and translator.
- Derwin Brown, 46, American police officer and sheriff-elect of DeKalb County, shot.
- Christopher Dearnley, 70, English cathedral organist.
- Bubba Floyd, 83, American baseball player (Detroit Tigers).
- Inigo Gallo, 68, Swiss comedian, radio personality, and actor, liver cancer.
- Gour Kishore Ghosh, 77, Bengali writer and journalist.
- Jacques Goddet, 95, French sports journalist and director of the Tour de France.
- Eric Mahn, 75, Chilean Olympic basketball player (1952).
- Valery Nikolin, 61, Soviet Russian Olympic sailor (1964).
- Chiang Peng-chien, 60, Taiwanese politician, pancreatic cancer.

=== 16 ===
- William Brandt, 76, American politician and banker.
- Saad Dahlab, Algerian politician.
- Blue Demon, 78, Mexican masked wrestler and actor, myocardial infarction.
- Grigory Kiselyov, 63, Soviet Russian Olympic swimmer (1960).
- Heinz Maier-Leibnitz, 89, German physicist.
- Alain-Philippe Malagnac, 49, French actor, smoke inhalation.
- Victor Owusu, 76, Ghanaian politician and lawyer.
- Hugh W. Pinnock, 66, American Mormon leader, pulmonary fibrosis.
- Chuck Pratt, 61, American rock climber, heart attack.
- Theo Saevecke, 89, Nazi German SS officer and holocaust perpetrator.

=== 17 ===
- Gerald Aylmer, 74, British historian.
- Peter Barrett, 65, American sailor and Olympic champion (1960, 1964, 1968).
- Gérard Blain, 70, French actor and film director, cancer.
- John Alexander Carroll, American academic.
- Harold Rhodes, 89, American music inventor, pneumonia.
- Jeroom Riske, 81, Belgian Olympic gymnast (1952).
- Erich Schmid, 93, Swiss conductor.

=== 18 ===
- Paddy Barry, 72, Irish hurler.
- Hal Call, 83, American LGBT rights activist, and U.S. Army veteran, congestive heart failure.
- Lluís Claramunt, 49, Spanish artist.
- Pedro Consuegra, 70, Argentine Olympic water polo player (1960).
- José D'Andrea, 85, Argentine Olympic fencer (1948, 1952).
- Harry DeWolf, 97, Canadian naval officer during World War II.
- Lajos Dunai, 58, Hungarian football player and Olympian (1968).
- Stan Fox, 48, American race car driver, traffic collision.
- Randolph Apperson Hearst, 85, American newspaper publisher (Hearst Corporation), stroke.
- Norman Humphries, 83, English cricket player.
- Kirsty MacColl, 41, British singer-songwriter, struck by a speedboat while diving.
- Madhavapeddi Satyam, 78, Indian actor and singer.
- Giorgio Saviane, 84, Italian author.
- Nick Stewart, 90, American television and film actor, natural causes.

=== 19 ===
- Pierre Allain, 96, French alpinist.
- Mahmud Baksi, 56, Kurdish writer and journalist, kidney failure.
- Reginald Bennett, 89, English politician, psychiatrist and painter.
- Rob Buck, 42, American musician (10,000 Maniacs), liver disease.
- J. P. Carter, 85, American officer, politician and educator.
- Ayres d'Aguiar, 104, Portuguese film producer.
- Michel Dens, 89, French baritone.
- György Györffy, 83, Hungarian historian.
- Milt Hinton, 90, American double bassist and photographer.
- Lars Kirkebjerg, 78, Danish Olympic equestrian (1956).
- John Lindsay, 79, 103rd Mayor of New York City, Parkinson's disease.
- William L. Moran, 79, American assyriologist.
- Lou Polli, 99, Italian-American baseball player (St. Louis Browns, New York Giants).
- Son Sann, 89, Cambodian politician and resistance leader.
- Pops Staples, 85, patriarch of The Staple Singers, concussion from a fall.
- Lou Thuman, 84, American baseball player (Washington Senators).
- Laurence Whistler, 88, British poet and artist.

=== 20 ===
- Bill Clarke, 68, Canadian football player, Parkinson's disease.
- Wayne Connally, 77, American politician.
- Myriel Davies, 80, Welsh peace activist.
- Mirza Ghulam Hafiz, 80, Bangladeshi statesman, politician, and philanthropist.
- Richard Hazard, 79, American television composer, conductor and songwriter, cancer.
- Adrian Henri, 68, British poet and painter (Liverpool Poets).
- Patriarch Diodoros of Jerusalem, 77, Greek Orthodox Patriarch of Jerusalem (1980–2000), diabetes.
- Syed Abdul Malik, 81, Indian Assamese writer.
- Alexander Ramsay of Mar, 80, British aristocrat.

=== 21 ===
- Rober Eryol, 70, Turkish football player.
- Alfred J. Gross, 82, American inventor and a pioneer in mobile wireless communication.
- Florynce Kennedy, 84, American lawyer, feminist, civil rights advocate, and activist.
- John Lee, 72, Australian actor.
- Edward Miller, 85, British historian (Master of Fitzwilliam College, Cambridge).
- Stephen A. Mitchell, 54, American clinical psychologist and psychoanalyst, heart failure.
- Norman Morrell, 88, British wrestler and Olympian (1936).
- Gord Reay, 57, Canadian Army officer, road accident.
- Derek Trevis, 58, English football player.
- Renaat Van Elslande, 84, Belgian politician.

=== 22 ===
- Lianella Carell, 73, Italian film actress and screenwriter.
- Arthur Juda Cohen, 90, Dutch resistance member.
- Giuseppe Colnago, 77, Italian Grand Prix motorcycle road racer.
- Herman Feshbach, 83, American physicist, heart failure.
- Vytautas Kulakauskas, 80, Lithuanian basketball player, and coach.
- Stuart Lancaster, 80, American actor.
- Connie McCready, 79, American journalist and politician, complications from a stroke.
- Gottfried von Meiss, 91, Swiss Olympic fencer (1936, 1948).
- Edson Mitchell, 47, American investment banker and executive, plane crash.
- Allan Smethurst, 73, English folk singer, heart attack.

=== 23 ===
- Esther B. Aresty, 92, American cookbook writer.
- Wilfred Arthur, 81, Australian fighter ace of the RAAF during World War II.
- Larry Baker, 63, American gridiron football player (New York Titans).
- Billy Barty, 76, American actor (Willow, Legend, Masters of the Universe), heart failure.
- Susan Berman, 55, American journalist and author, shot.
- Victor Borge, 91, Danish-American comedian and pianist.
- Vinal G. Good, 94, American politician and lawyer from Maine.
- Aage Haugland, 56, Danish operatic bass, cancer.
- Noor Jehan, 74, Pakistani actress and singer, heart failure.
- Louis Leprince-Ringuet, 99, French physicist, essayist and historian of science.
- Jimmy Shand, 92, Scottish musician.
- Dan Turk, 38, American football player (Pittsburgh Steelers, Tampa Bay Buccaneers, Oakland Raiders), testicular cancer.
- Marvin Williams, 80, American baseball player.

=== 24 ===
- Horace Barker, 93, American biochemist and microbiologist, heart failure.
- Tom Benson, 71, Irish politician.
- John Cooper, 77, British automobile designer (Cooper Car Company).
- Sadek Hilal, 70, Egyptian-American radiologist.
- Seo Jeong-ju, 85, Korean poet and academic.
- Sadik Kaceli, 86, Albanian artist.
- Lucienne Laudré-Viel, 93, French athlete and Olympian (1928).
- Nick Massi, 73, American bass singer and bass guitarist for The Four Seasons, liver cancer.
- Helena Pajović, 21, Serbian figure skater, traffic collision.
- Howard Yerges, 76, American gridiron football player.
- Laurence Chisholm Young, 95, British mathematician.

=== 25 ===
- Truus Baumeister, 93, Dutch freestyle swimmer and Olympian (1928).
- Décio Esteves, 73, Brazilian football player and coach.
- George Feigenbaum, 71, American basketball player.
- Robert Francis Garner, 80, American Roman Catholic prelate.
- Joe Gilliam, 49, American gridiron football player (Pittsburgh Steelers), cocaine overdose.
- Dheerendra Gopal, 60, Indian film and stage actor, jaundice attack.
- Neil Hawke, 61, Australian cricket player.
- Willard Van Orman Quine, 92, American philosopher and logician in the analytic tradition.
- Sam Savitt, 83, American equine artist, author, and book illustrator.
- Vibhuti Narayan Singh, 73, Indian sanskrit scholar and maharaja of Benares.
- Peter W. Staub, 90, Swiss actor and singer.
- Ignacy Tłoczyński, 89, Polish tennis player and coach.

=== 26 ===
- James Bentley, 63, English author and Anglican priest, injuries from a collision.
- Ben Bluitt, 76, American basketball player.
- John Coatta, 71, American football player and coach.
- Wálter Daga, 55, Peruvian footballer.
- Michael Deacon, 63, Scottish actor, lung cancer.
- José Hernández Delgadillo, 73, Mexican painter and muralist.
- Mirra Ginsburg, 91, Russian-American translator of Russian literature and children's writer.
- Leo Gordon, 78, American character actor, cardiac failure.
- Alan Harris, 84, British engineer.
- Walter Hayes, British journalist and business executive, lung cancer.
- Magik, 22, Polish rapper, suicide by jumping.
- John McLeay Jr., 78, Australian politician.
- Herman Nickerson Jr., 87, United States Marine Corps lieutenant general.
- Jason Robards, 78, American actor (All the President's Men, Julia, Once Upon a Time in the West), Oscar winner (1977, 1978), lung cancer.
- Guy-Pierre Volpert, 84, French Olympic ice hockey player (1936).
- Gust Zarnas, 87, American gridiron football player (Chicago Bears, Brooklyn Dodgers, Green Bay Packers).

=== 27 ===
- Erwin Ammann, 84, German politician.
- William Hanes Ayres, 84, American politician, heart and kidney ailments.
- Harold Bird-Wilson, 81, British flying ace.
- Marc Boileau, 68, Canadian ice hockey coach (Pittsburgh Penguins), and player (Detroit Red Wings), heart attack.
- Frances Jones Bonner, 81, American psychoanalyst.
- Mark Brandis, 69, German writer and journalist.
- Toshiyasu Ishige, 68, Japanese Olympic sports shooter (1964, 1976).
- Walter Keane, 85, American plagiarist.
- Jack McVea, 86, American woodwind player and bandleader.
- Francis Sumner Merritt, 87, American painter, and art teacher.
- Roy Partee, 83, American baseball player (Boston Red Sox, St. Louis Browns).
- David de Pury, 57, Swiss businessman and diplomat, pancreatic cancer.
- Joe Schaefer, 76, American ice hockey player (New York Rangers).

=== 28 ===
- Eduard Adorno, 80, German politician and member of the Bundestag.
- Vivian Blake, 79, Jamaican lawyer and politician.
- Aminuddin Dagar, 77, Indian Dhrupad singer.
- João Fragoso, 87, Portuguese painter.
- Sergey Grishchenko, 53, Soviet Olympic alpine skier (1972).
- Arnold Hutschnecker, 102, Austrian-American medical doctor.
- William X. Kienzle, 72, American priest and author (The Rosary Murders, Death Wears a Red Hat), heart attack.

=== 29 ===
- Julio Aguilar Azañón, 66, Spanish politician.
- Renata Carraretto, 77, Italian Olympic alpine skier (1948).
- Adele Stimmel Chase, 83, American artist.
- Brian Christen, 74, Canadian cricketer.
- Louis-René des Forêts, 84, French writer.
- Ebou Dibba, 57, Gambian novelist and a teacher.
- Juan Giménez, 73, Argentine footballer.
- Herbert Halpert, 89, American anthropologist and folklorist.
- Jacques Laurent, 81, French writer and journalist, suicide.
- Woodley Lewis, 75, American football player (Los Angeles Rams, Chicago Cardinals, Dallas Cowboys), heart and kidney problems.
- Truett Smith, 76, American football player (Pittsburgh Steelers).

=== 30 ===
- Bhawani Lal Verma, 74, Indian politician.
- Stanley Blacker, 79, American fashion designer.
- Tom Blohm, 80, Norwegian football player and Olympian (1952).
- Stanisław Broniewski, 85, Polish economist.
- Alfred Burger, 95, Austrian chemist.
- James C. Corman, 80, American politician (U.S. Representative for California's 21st and 22nd congressional districts), stroke.
- Benjamin Dabbs, 91, English footballer.
- Tommy Deans, 78, Scottish footballer.
- Julius J. Epstein, 91, American screenwriter (Casablanca, Arsenic and Old Lace, Reuben, Reuben), Oscar winner (1944).
- Brynhild Grasmoen, 71, American Olympic alpine skier (1948).
- John Hardon, 86, American Jesuit priest, writer, and theologian, bone cancer.
- Lionel Hebert, 72, American professional golfer.
- Rudolf Schnyder, 71, Swiss sport shooter and Olympic silver medalist (1948, 1952).
- Oliver Taylor, 62, Australian boxer and Olympian (1960).
- Walter Tomsen, 88, American sport shooter and Olympic silver medalist (1948).
- Isakas Vistaneckis, 90, Lithuanian chess player.
- Bohdan Warchal, 70, Slovak violinist.

=== 31 ===
- Jean Canfield, 81, Canadian politician.
- André Capet, 61, French politician, seizure.
- Viera Cierliukievič, 59, Belarusian political and trade union activist, cancer.
- Joseph E. Coleman, 78, American politician, attorney and chemist.
- Alan Cranston, 86, American politician, U.S. Senator from California (1969–1993), natural causes.
- Sebastian de Grazia, 83, American philosopher.
- Harry Dorish, 79, American baseball player (Boston Red Sox, Chicago White Sox, Baltimore Orioles).
- Wayne Glasgow, 74, American basketball player and Olympian (1952).
- José Greco, 82, Italian-American flamenco dancer and choreographer, heart failure.
- Binyamin Ze'ev Kahane, 34, Israeli rabbi and settler, shot in an ambush.
- Anne Macnaghten, 92, British violinist.
- Tanaquil Le Clercq, 71, French ballet dancer (New York City Ballet), pneumonia.
- Kenneth Lee Pike, 88, American linguist and anthropologist.
- Bekzat Sattarkhanov, 20, Kazakh boxer and Olympian (2000), traffic collision.
- Edna Savage, 64, British pop singer.
- Eddy Shaver, 38, American country-rock musician, heroin overdose.
- Jack Snowden, 77, Singaporean Olympic sailor (1956).
- V. V. K. Valath, 82, Indian writer, poet, and historian of Malayalam language.
