= Mario Torres =

The name Mario Torres may refer to:

- Mário Torres (1931-2020), Portuguese footballer
- Mario Torres (Chilean footballer) (1931-1975)
- Mario Torres Gázquez, Spanish businessman
