= Daniel Morales =

Daniel Morales may refer to:

- Daniel Morales (swimmer) (born 1977), Spanish former swimmer
- Daniel Morales (footballer, born 1975), former Brazilian footballer
- Daniel Morales (Chilean footballer) (1928-2007), Chilean footballer
- Daniel Morales, birth name of Venezuelan singer and producer Danny Ocean
- Dan Morales (born 1956), American politician from Texas
