= Juan Castro (disambiguation) =

Juan Castro may refer to:

- Juan Castro, Mexican baseball player
- Juan Castro (bishop), Colombian bishop
- Juan Castro (footballer), Mexican footballer
- Juan Alberto Castro, Argentine footballer
- Juan José Castro, Argentine composer
- Juan Pablo Castro, Argentine rugby union player
- Juan de Castro, Spanish bishop and cardinal
- Juan de Castro (bishop of Taranto), Italian bishop
