= Toshiyasu =

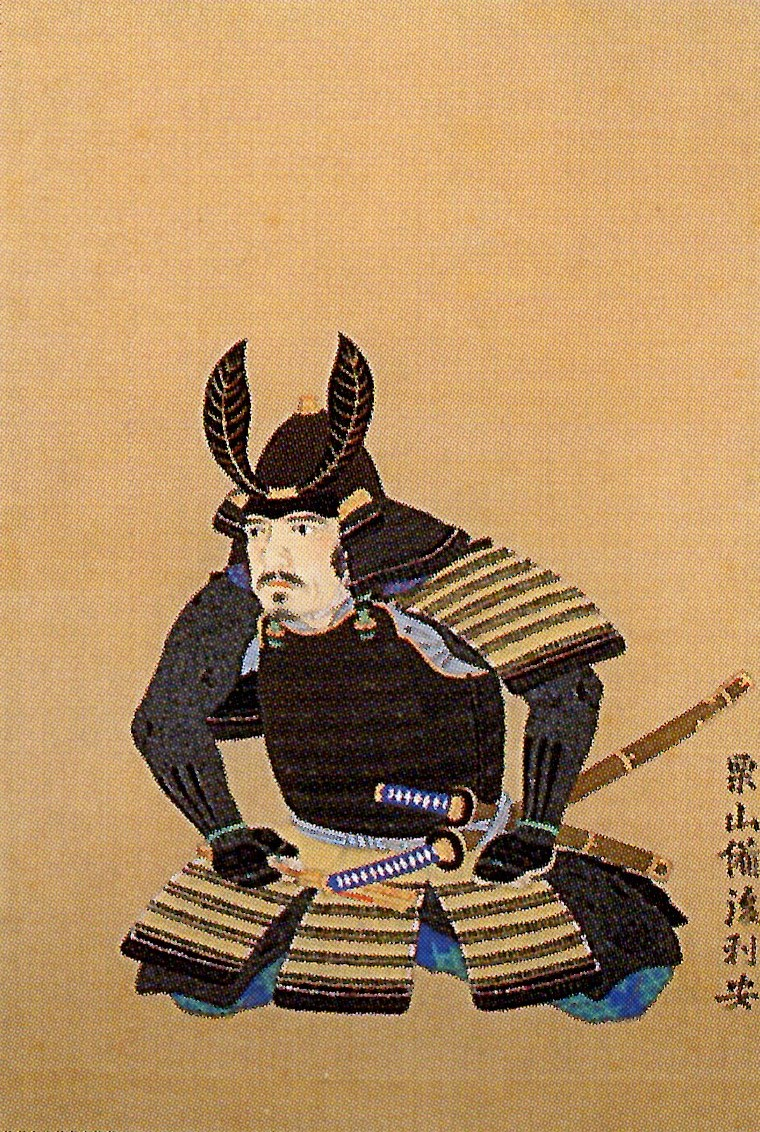
- Toshiyasu Kuriyama (1550-1631), Japanese samurai
- Pronunciation: toɕijasɯ (IPA)
- Gender: Male

Origin
- Origin: Japanese
- Meaning: Different meanings depending on the kanji used

Other names
- Alternative spelling: Tosiyasu (Kunrei-shiki) Tosiyasu (Nihon-shiki) Toshiyasu (Hepburn)

Toshiyasu is a masculine Japanese given name.

== Written forms ==
Toshiyasu can be written using different combinations of kanji characters. Here are some examples:

- 敏康, "agile, healthy"
- 敏安, "agile, peaceful"
- 敏靖, "agile, peaceful"
- 敏泰, "agile, peaceful"
- 敏保, "agile, preserve"
- 敏易, "agile, divination"
- 俊康, "talented, healthy"
- 俊安, "talented, peaceful"
- 俊靖, "talented, peaceful"
- 俊泰, "talented, peaceful"
- 俊保, "talented, preserve"
- 俊易, "talented, divination"
- 利康, "benefit, healthy"
- 利安, "benefit, peaceful"
- 利靖, "benefit, peaceful"
- 寿康, "long life, healthy"
- 寿安, "long life, peaceful"
- 寿泰, "long life, peaceful"
- 年康, "year, healthy"
- 年安, "year, peaceful"
- 年易, "year, divination"

The name can also be written in hiragana としやす or katakana トシヤス.

== Notable people with the name ==
- Toshiyasu Kuriyama (栗山 利安, 1550-1631), Japanese samurai.
- Toshiyasu Ishige (石下 年安, born 1932), Japanese sport shooter.
- Toshiyasu Takahara (髙原 寿康, born 1980), Japanese footballer.
