= Nikolay Alexandrovich Butinov =

- Born: 19 December 1914; Petrograd, Saint Petersburg
- Died: 7 December 2000 (aged 85) aint Petersburg
- Citizenship: USSR; Russia
- Education: Leningrad University
- Awards: Medal for the Defence of Leningrad, Medal for Valiant Labor in the Great Patriotic War 1941–1945
- Scientific career
- Fields: ethnography
- Workplaces: Institute of Ethnography, USSR Academy of Sciences
- Doctoral advisor: Vladimir Yakovlevich Propp

Nikolay Alexandrovich Butinov (19 December 1914 – 7 December 2000) was a Soviet and Russian ethnographer, specializing in prehistoric societies and Oceanic studies. He held a doctorate in historical sciences and was a laureate of the N. N. Miklukho-Maklai Prize (1987).

== Biography ==
Born into a working-class family, Butinov entered the Department of Ethnography at Leningrad University in 1938, then part of the philological faculty. He graduated in 1942, having been evacuated to Saratov during World War II. In 1946, under the guidance of Vladimir Propp, he defended his candidate dissertation on the "Teachings of Fritz Graebner". The same year, he became a research fellow at the Leningrad branch of the Institute of Ethnography, USSR Academy of Sciences. In 1970, he defended his doctoral dissertation "The Papuans of New Guinea: Ethnic Composition, Economy, Social Structure".

From 1972, Butinov headed the Australia, Oceania, and Indonesia sector at the Institute, co-creating the exhibition "Indigenous Peoples of Australia and Oceania". He contributed to the collected works of Nikolay Miklukho-Maklai (1948–1953 and 1990–1999) and the volume "Peoples of Australia and Oceania" (1956) in the series "Peoples of the World: Ethnographic Essays". He founded the annual Miklukho-Maklai Readings (1980) and was awarded the N. N. Miklukho-Maklai Prize of the USSR Academy of Sciences in 1987.

Butinov was married to the ethnographer Maria Sidorovna Butinova (1920–2007).

== Scientific contributions ==
Butinov made significant contributions to the decipherment of rongorongo. He explored the relationship between ethnos and nation in the context of the young states of Oceania. In his works on prehistoric societies, he examined issues such as linguistic continuity, the origin of exogamy, the typology of communities, and forms of marriage. Contrary to the dominant views of Friedrich Engels, Butinov argued for the priority of communal structures over clans, asserting the ancient coexistence of matrilineal and patrilineal clans. His theoretical views were criticized by Sergey Tolstov, Yuri Semyonov, and other Soviet authors.

Vladimir Kabo recalled that when Butinov headed the Australia and Oceania department at the Institute: "…he was still a fighter. He courageously fought against the dogmatism prevailing in our ethnographic science, and he did so alone at the time. This essentially meant fighting against the institute's administration where he worked. He tried to oppose dogmatic Marxism with what he considered genuine, creative Marxism. Alongside this, he wrote numerous reviews and articles exposing Western ethnographers and bourgeois science, which partially redeemed his own scientific heresy. At the same time, he deeply studied social relations among the peoples of Oceania—primarily the Papuans of New Guinea. He had a youthful obsession—in science and in his desire to one day visit New Guinea. And his life's dream came true—he set foot on the land of New Guinea, and the Papuans welcomed him as the new Miklukho-Maklai. Thin, with a hedgehog of graying hair, he still seemed young even at seventy.".

== Major works ==
Books

- The Papuans of New Guinea: Economy, Social Structure (1970)
- N. N. Miklukho-Maklai – The Great Russian Scientist-Humanist: On the 100th Anniversary of His First Expedition to New Guinea (1971)
- The Road to Maclay Coast (1975)
- The Polynesians of the Tuvalu Islands (1982)
- The Social Organization of the Polynesians (1985)
- Peoples of Papua New Guinea: From Tribal System to Independent State (2000)
- Problems of Ethnography and Cultural History of the Asian-Pacific Region Peoples. Saint Petersburg: Petersburg Oriental Studies, 2004. p. 365. ISBN 585803246X.
