= Ángel Schandlein =

Argentine footballer

Personal information
- Full name: Ángel Osvaldo Schadlein
- Date of birth: 12 August 1930
- Date of death: 4 April 1998 (aged 67)
- Position: Defender

International career
Years	Team	Apps	(Gls)
1956–1957	Argentina	9	(0)

Ángel Schandlein (12 August 1930 - 4 April 1998) was an Argentine footballer. He played in nine matches for the Argentina national football team in 1956 and 1957. He was also part of Argentina's squad for the 1957 South American Championship.
