= Raúl Águila =

Chilean footballer (1930–2016)

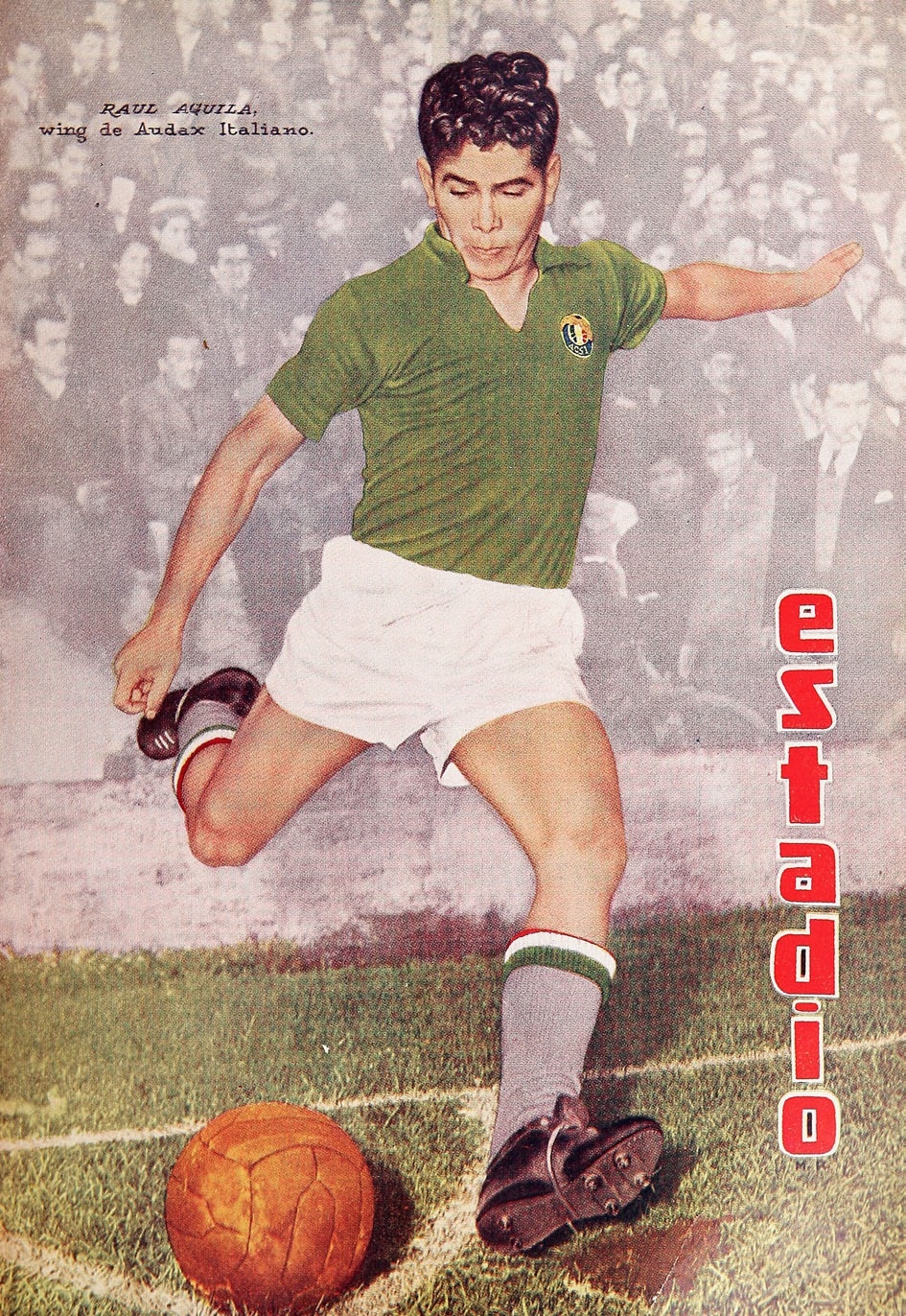
- Águila with Audax Italiano in 1952

Personal information
- Full name: Raúl Cornelio Águila Herrera
- Date of birth: 16 September 1930
- Place of birth: Arica, Chile
- Date of death: 29 September 2016 (aged 86)
- Place of death: La Florida, Chile
- Position: Forward

Senior career*
Years	Team	Apps	(Gls)
1951–1963	Audax Italiano		
1964–1966	Unión San Felipe	68	(4)

International career
1956–1957	Chile	7	(0)
- * Club domestic league appearances and goals

Raúl Cornelio Águila Herrera (16 September 1930 – 29 September 2016) was a Chilean footballer. He played in seven matches for the Chile national football team in 1956 and 1957. He was also part of Chile's squad for the 1957 South American Championship.

== Career ==
On 6 April 1965, Águila was one of the constituent footballers of SIFUP, the trade union of professionales footballers in Chile, alongside fellows such as Pedro Araya, Manuel Astorga, Juan Rodríguez Vega, among others.
