= José Salerno =

Argentine football manager

Personal information
- Full name: José Antonio Salerno Dullan
- Date of birth: 4 June 1914
- Place of birth: Lomas de Zamora, Argentina
- Date of death: 19 February 1984 (aged 69)
- Position: Left winger

Senior career*
Years	Team	Apps	(Gls)
- Argentinos de Banfield

Managerial career
- 1933–1939: Gimnasia La Plata (youth)
- 1940–1943: San Lorenzo (assistant)
- 1951: Rosario Central (assistant)
- 1951: Rosario Central (caretaker)
- 1953–1956: Green Cross
- 1956–1957: Chile
- 1958–1960: O'Higgins
- 1960: Green Cross
- * Club domestic league appearances and goals

José Antonio Salerno Dullan (4 June 1914 – 19 February 1984) was an Argentine football player and manager.

== Playing career ==
A left winger, Salerno played for Argentinos de Banfield and retired at a young age due to a leg fracture.

== Managerial career ==
=== As coach ===
As a football coach, Salerno started his career as coach of the Gimnasia La Plata youth ranks under Emérico Hirsch. He also served as assistant coach in San Lorenzo de Almagro and Rosario Central. He sometimes led Rosario Central due to the fact that the head coach, Mario Fortunato, coached Chacarita Juniors at the same time.

Salerno came to Chile in June 1953 to coach Green Cross in the top division. In the mid-1956, Salerno was appointed the manager of the Chile national team and led them in a friendly against Czechoslovakia on 26 August 1956 and the 1957 South American Championship.

Following the Chile national team, Salerno led O'Higgins from 1958 to 1960 and Green Cross in 1960, winning the Segunda División.

=== As leader ===
Salerno served as sport manager of Deportes Concepción in the 1960's.

Salerno served as a representative of the Asociación Central de Fútbol de Chile (Central Football Association of Chile).
