= Oreste Corbatta =

Argentine footballer

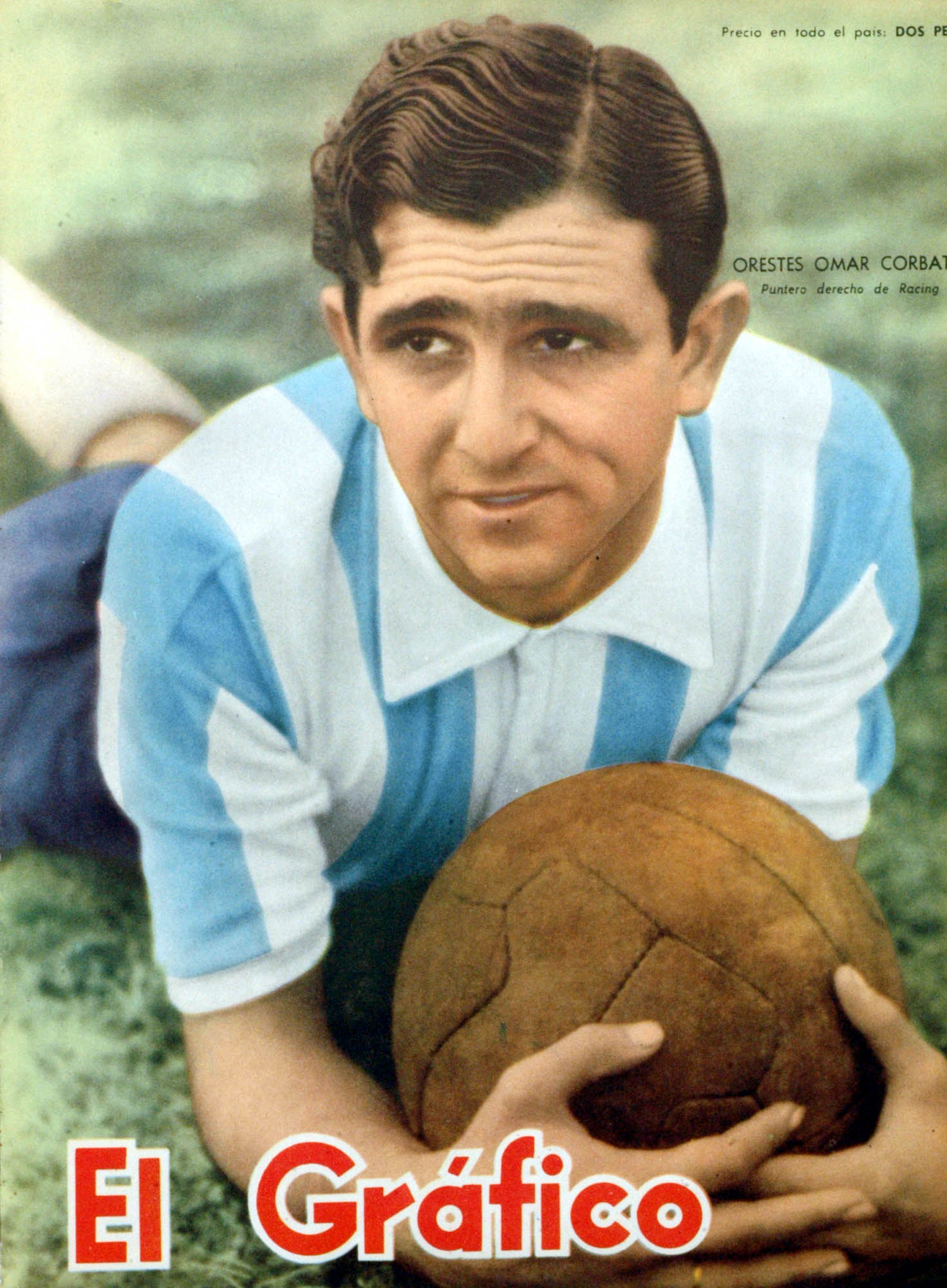
- Corbatta on the cover of El Gráfico, 1955

Personal information
- Full name: Oreste Osmar Corbatta Fernández
- Date of birth: 11 March 1936
- Place of birth: Daireaux, Argentina
- Date of death: 6 November 1991 (aged 55)
- Place of death: La Plata, Argentina
- Height: 1.65 m (5 ft 5 in)
- Position: Winger

Youth career
- Estudiantes LP
- 1953–1955: Juverlandia

Senior career*
Years	Team	Apps	(Gls)
1955–1962	Racing Club	177	(72)
1962–1965	Boca Juniors	18	(7)
1965–1968	Independiente Medellín	145	(34)
1970	San Telmo	33	(10)
1971	Italia Unidos		
1973–1974	Tiro Federal		

International career
1956–1962	Argentina	43	(18)
- * Club domestic league appearances and goals

Oreste Osmar Corbatta Fernández (11 March 1936 – 6 November 1991) was an Argentine footballer who played as right winger. Corbatta is regarded as the greatest idol in the history of Racing Club.

Dubbed Arlequín and El dueño de la raya (The chairman of the sideline), he played for five clubs in his country –six in total– mainly Racing Club and Boca Juniors, winning four major titles and scoring 86 official goals with both teams combined.

An accomplished penalty kick taker, Corbatta earned more than 40 caps for the national side in the 50s/60s, and represented the country at the 1958 World Cup.

== Club career ==
Born in Daireaux, Buenos Aires Province to an Italian immigrant from Recanati and an Argentine mother, Corbatta gave his first steps in football playing for Estudiantes de La Plata at 14 years old. In 1953 he joined Club Juverlandia of Chascomús to play the Liga Platense regional championship. His performances on the field called the attention of Racing Club de Avellaneda, who hired him on loan for one year.

Corbatta started his professional career on 30 April 1955, making his debut in Argentine Primera División in a 0–1 loss against Gimnasia y Esgrima La Plata. Corbatta was one of the La Academía key players that helped the team to win the 1958 and 1961 league titles.

In 1963, Corbatta joined Boca Juniors for 12 million pesos, with which Racing was able to improve the conditions in its stadium and build new sporting facilities. On 19 May 1963, he scored all the goals in a 3–0 home win against Vélez Sarsfield, and also featured in that year's Copa Libertadores final loss against Pelé's Santos FC; in his final two years in La Bombonera, he added a further two national championships.

Corbatta joined Independiente Medellín in 1965, remaining in Colombia for three years. He returned to his country for spells with lower league sides San Telmo, Italia Unidos and Tiro Federal, retiring from football at the age of 38. During his professional career, he only missed four of 68 penalties.

== International career ==
Corbatta played a total of 43 games for Argentina in which he scored 18 goals, at one time ranking in joint-13th place with Domingo Tarasconi. He was part of the South American Championship-winning team in 1957, when he formed a legendary attacking line with Humberto Maschio, Antonio Angelillo, Omar Sívori and Osvaldo Héctor Cruz. They were nicknamed the Carasucias, and that was the first Argentine achievement with a great repercussion on the media. Because of his great performance in the tournament, a Chilean journalist defined Corbatta as "the animated cartoon player". With Corbatta in the team, Argentina would repeat the feat in 1959.

Corbatta also appeared in the 1958 FIFA World Cup in Sweden, contributing with three goals in three games in an eventual group stage exit.

== Personal life and tribute ==
Corbatta struggled heavily with alcoholism, playing several games in a state of full inebriation. Illiterate, he never learned to read.

Poor and alone – he married and divorced four times – Corbatta died of larynx cancer in La Plata in 1991, aged 55. In 2006, to mark the 15th anniversary of his death, he was inaugurated into the Racing Club Hall of Fame, and a bronze statue by Daniel Zimermann was unveiled. The Avellaneda municipality renamed the stadium's backstreet to "Pasaje Corbatta" in his honor.

"Don't pass me the ball because I can't see it", from Corbatta to teammate Raúl Belén before a Racing v Estudiantes de La Plata match. Corbatta had arrived in Racing Club Stadium so heavily drunk that he needed to be reanimated by club employees. Although he could not be completely recovered, he jumped to the field and scored two goals.

Do you know why (my rivals) could not take me the ball away? Because "she" (Note: Corbatta referred the ball using the feminine form, as it's usual in some South American countries to express love for the game.) didn't want to abandon me. Other things were indeed taken away from me, but not the ball.

— Corbatta in an interview, remembering his skills with the ball and his back luck with women

Corbatta was a phenomenal player. He did imposible things. He was crazy, but about football. When he dribbled it seemed that rivals could never take the ball away from him. He became an idol of Limeños (people from Lima). After the 3–0 win over Brazil, he was acclaimed by the whole attendance, giving his shirt to them as retribution.

— Humberto Maschio, Corbatta's teammate in Racing Club and Argentina national team

== Honours ==
=== Club ===
Racing

- Primera División: 1958, 1961

Boca Juniors

- Primera División: 1964, 1965
- Copa Libertadores runner-up: 1963

=== International ===
Argentina

- South American Championship: 1957, 1959
