= Jesús Picó =

Chilean footballer (1935-1993)

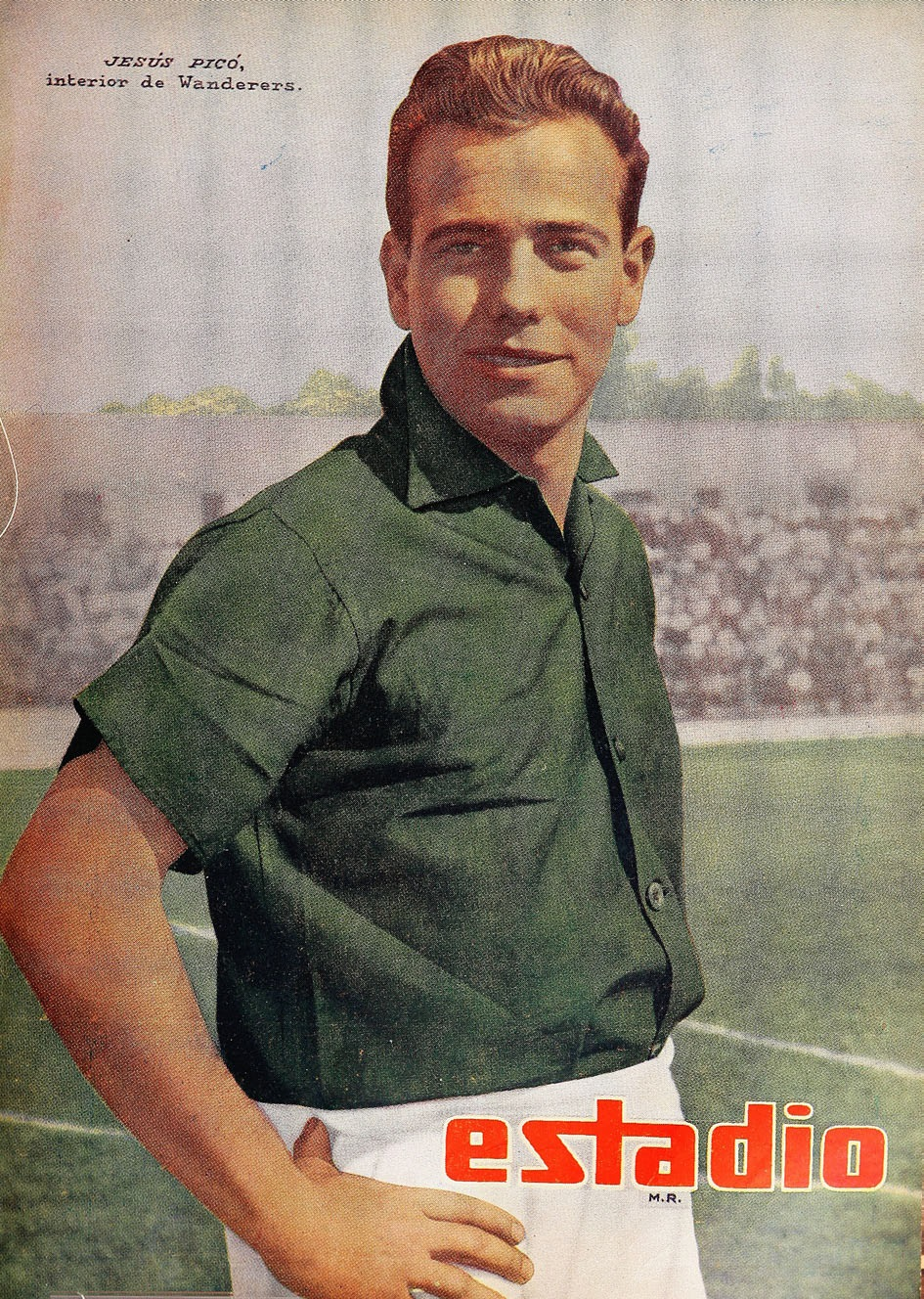
- Picó on Estadio in 1955

Personal information
- Full name: Jesús Bernardino Picó Imatz
- Date of birth: 20 April 1935
- Place of birth: Viña del Mar, Chile
- Date of death: 20 December 1993 (aged 58)
- Place of death: Valparaíso, Chile
- Position: Midfielder

Youth career
- Estadio Español
- Santiago Wanderers

Senior career*
Years	Team	Apps	(Gls)
1952–1959	Santiago Wanderers		
1960–1961	San Luis		
1962	Santiago Wanderers		
1962	Magallanes		
1964	Santiago Wanderers		

International career
1957	Chile	5	(0)
- * Club domestic league appearances and goals

Jesús Bernardino Picó Imatz (20 April 1935 – 20 December 1993) was a Chilean footballer. He played in five matches for the Chile national football team in 1957. He was also part of Chile's squad for the 1957 South American Championship.

== Personal life ==
His parents were Vicente Picó Pérez and Exequiela Imatz. His father came to Valparaíso, Chile, from Cantabria at the beginning of the 20th century and his mother was of Basque descent.

Picó was nicknamed Polilla (Moth).
