= Walter Marichal =

Uruguayan footballer (1935-2017)

Personal information
- Date of birth: 18 April 1935
- Date of death: 31 July 2017 (aged 82)
- Position: Defender

International career
Years	Team	Apps	(Gls)
1957–1958	Uruguay	3	(0)

Walter Marichal (18 April 1935 – 31 July 2017) is a Uruguayan footballer. He played in three matches for the Uruguay national football team from 1957 to 1958. He was also part of Uruguay's squad for the 1957 South American Championship.
