= David Iñigo =

Argentine footballer

David Carmelo Iñigo
Personal information
- Date of birth: 16 June 1934
- Place of birth: San Miguel de Tucumán, Argentina
- Date of death: 14 June 2005 (aged 70)
- Position: Midfielder

Senior career*
Years	Team	Apps	(Gls)
1956-1960	San Lorenzo		
1961-1966	Chacarita Juniors		

International career
1957–1963	Argentina	4	(0)
Medal record
Representing Argentina
Copa América
Winner	1957 Peru
- * Club domestic league appearances and goals

David Carmelo Iñigo (16 June 1934 – 14 June 2005) was an Argentine footballer. He played in four matches for the Argentina national football team from 1957 to 1963. He was also part of Argentina's squad that won the 1957 South American Championship. He died on 14 June 2005, at the age of 70.
