= Gonzalo Carrasco =

Chilean footballer (1935-2013)

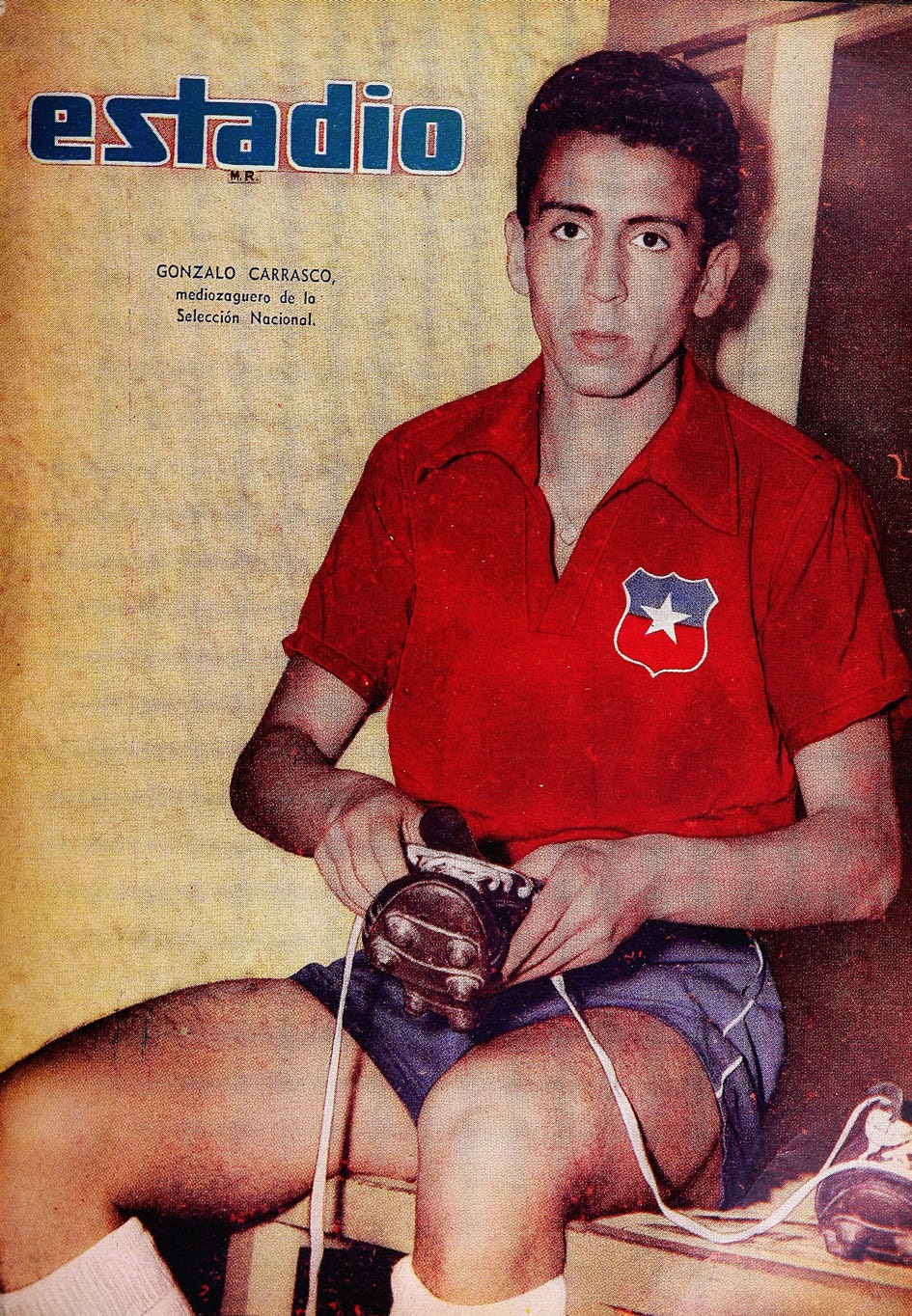

Personal information
- Date of birth: 28 July 1935
- Date of death: 27 December 2013 (aged 78)
- Position: Defender

International career
Years	Team	Apps	(Gls)
1957–1959	Chile	6	(0)

Gonzalo Carrasco (28 July 1935 – 27 December 2013) was a Chilean footballer. He played in six matches for the Chile national football team from 1957 to 1959. He was also part of Chile's squad for the 1957 South American Championship.
