= Jorge Benegas =

Argentine footballer (1922–2020)

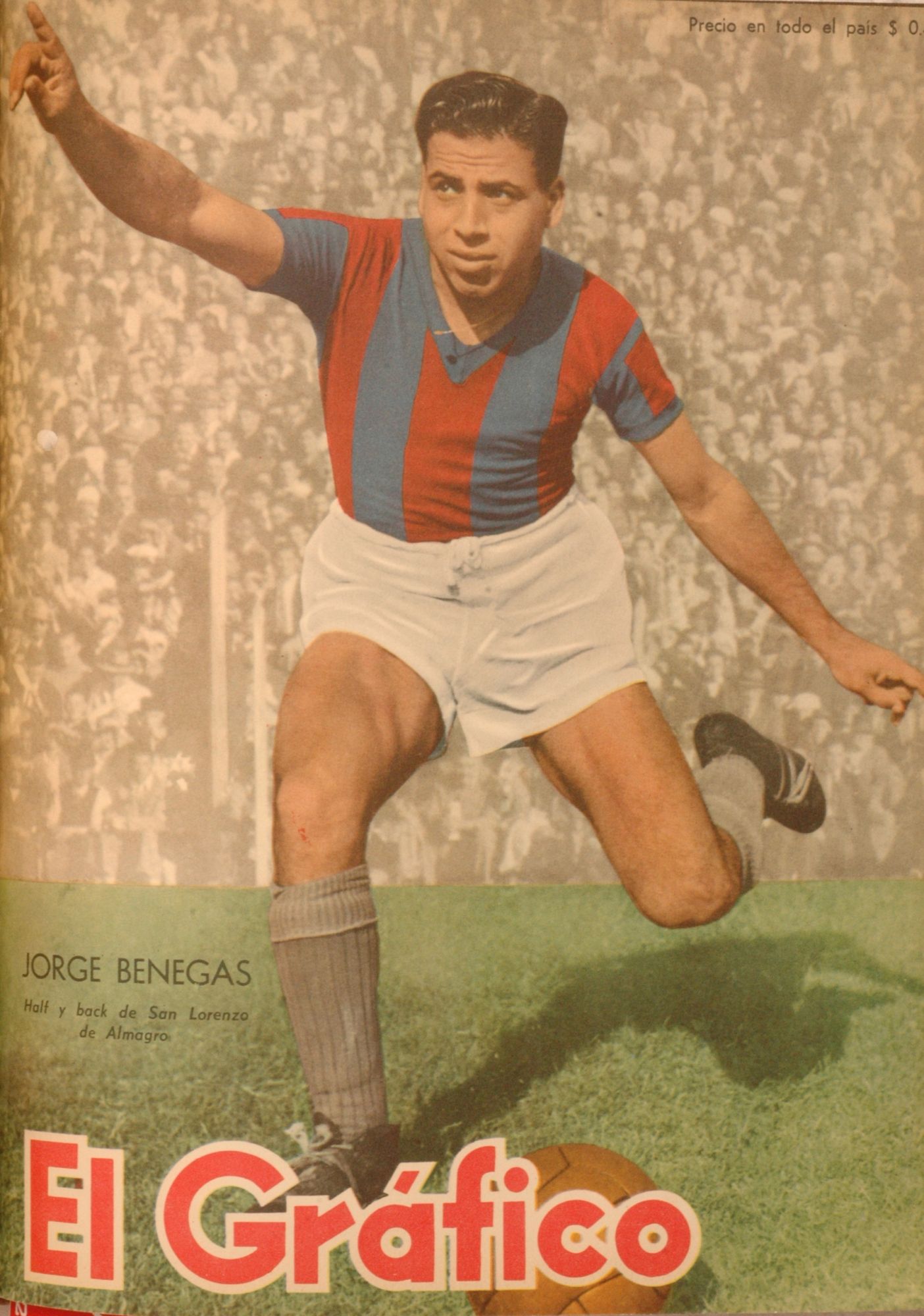

Personal information
- Date of birth: 30 November 1922
- Date of death: 26 August 2020 (aged 97)
- Position: Defender

International career
Years	Team	Apps	(Gls)
1956–1957	Argentina	5	(0)

Jorge Benegas (30 November 1922 – 26 August 2020) was an Argentine footballer. He played in five matches for the Argentina national football team in 1956 and 1957. He was also part of Argentina's squad for the 1957 South American Championship. Benegas died on 26 August 2020, at the age of 97.
