= Oscar Mantegari =

Argentine footballer

Personal information
- Date of birth: 20 October 1928
- Date of death: 13 May 2008 (aged 79)
- Position: Defender

International career
Years	Team	Apps	(Gls)
1957	Argentina	2	(0)

Oscar Mantegari (20 October 1928 – 13 May 2008) was an Argentine footballer. He played in two matches for the Argentina national football team in 1957. He was also part of Argentina's squad for the 1957 South American Championship.

== Honours ==
River Plate

- Argentine Primera División: 1953, 1955, 1956, 1957

Argentina

- Copa América: 1957
