= Roger Bernardico =

Uruguayan footballer (1935–2013)

Personal information
- Date of birth: 28 July 1935
- Date of death: 27 December 2013 (aged 78)
- Position: Goalkeeper

International career
| Years | Team | Apps | (Gls) |
| 1956–1964 | Uruguay | 9 | (0) |

Roger Bernardico (28 July 1935 – 27 December 2013) was a Uruguayan footballer. He played in nine matches for the Uruguay national football team from 1956 to 1964. He was also part of Uruguay's squad for the 1957 South American Championship.
