= José Fernández (Chilean footballer) =

Chilean footballer (1928-2009)

José Kurt Fernández Cisternas (February 23, 1928 – November 5, 2009) was a Chilean footballer who played as a forward for the Chile national team in the 1950s. He represented the national team in the 1957 South American Championship, scoring three goals.
