= Guillermo Fleming =

Peruvian footballer (1934–2020)

Personal information
- Full name: Guillermo Fleming Ramírez
- Date of birth: 9 April 1934
- Place of birth: Lima, Peru
- Date of death: 7 July 2020 (aged 86)
- Height: 1.80 m (5 ft 11 in)
- Position: Midfielder

Senior career*
Years	Team	Apps	(Gls)
1957–1961	Deportivo Municipal		
1962	Ciclista Lima		
1963–1964	KDT Nacional		
1967	Porvenir Miraflores		
1968–1969	Deportivo Municipal		
1969	Porvenir Miraflores		
1972	Miami Gatos		

International career
1957–1962	Peru	15	(0)
- * Club domestic league appearances and goals

Guillermo Fleming Ramírez (9 April 1934 – 7 July 2020) is a Peruvian professional footballer who played as midfielder. He is considered one of the idols of Deportivo Municipal of Lima.

== Playing career ==
=== Club career ===
Guillermo Willy Fleming distinguished himself with Deportivo Municipal in the 1960s. He won the Peruvian Second Division championship with the club in 1968, alongside Hugo Sotil, a prominent figure in Peruvian football.

He also had the opportunity to play for other Peruvian clubs, including Ciclista Lima in 1962, KDT Nacional in 1963, and Porvenir Miraflores twice in 1967 and 1969. He moved to the United States at the end of his career to play in Miami Gatos (now Miami Toros) in 1972.

=== International career ===
Peruvian international Willy Fleming earned 15 caps for the national team between 1957 and 1962 (scoring no goals). He notably played in two South American championships: in 1957 in Peru (six matches) and in 1959 in Argentina (three matches).

== Honours ==
Deportivo Municipal

- Peruvian Segunda División: 1968
