= Édson dos Santos =

Brazilian footballer

Personal information
- Date of birth: 19 March 1933 (age 93)
- Place of birth: Ilhéus, Brazil

International career
Years	Team	Apps	(Gls)
1956–1959	Brazil	18	(0)

Édson dos Santos (born 19 March 1933), sometimes known as just Édson, is a Brazilian footballer. He played in 18 matches for the Brazil national football team from 1956 to 1959. He was also part of Brazil's squad for the 1959 South American Championship that took place in Ecuador.
