= Luciano Macías =

Ecuadorian footballer (1935–2022)

Personal information
- Full name: Luciano Antonio Macías Argencio
- Date of birth: 28 May 1935
- Place of birth: Ancón, Santa Elena Province, Ecuador
- Date of death: 5 August 2022 (aged 87)
- Place of death: Guayaquil, Ecuador
- Height: 1.78 m (5 ft 10 in)
- Position: Defender

Senior career*
| Years | Team | Apps | (Gls) |
| 1951–1971 | Barcelona | | |
| 1962 | → Emelec (loan) | | |
| 1972 | Español de Zulia | | |
| 1972 | Miami Gatos | 10 | (0) |
| Total | | 10 | (0) |

International career
| 1957–1969 | Ecuador | 21 | (0) |
- * Club domestic league appearances and goals

Luciano Antonio Macías Argencio (28 May 1935 – 5 August 2022) was an Ecuadorian soccer player who played as a defender in the NASL. He also played for the Ecuador national team.

== Career statistics ==
=== Club ===
Appearances and goals by club, season and competition
| Club | Season | League | | | Cup | | Other | | Total | |
| Club | Season | Division | Apps | Goals | Apps | Goals | Apps | Goals | Apps | Goals |
|---|---|---|---|---|---|---|---|---|---|---|
| Miami Gatos | 1972 | NASL | 10 | 0 | 0 | 0 | 0 | 0 | 10 | 0 |
| Career total | | | 10 | 0 | 0 | 0 | 0 | 0 | 10 | 0 |

=== International ===
Appearances and goals by national team and year
| National team | Year | Apps | Goals |
|---|---|---|---|
| Ecuador | 1957 | 3 | 0 |
| Ecuador | 1960 | 2 | 0 |
| Ecuador | 1963 | 6 | 0 |
| Ecuador | 1965 | 5 | 0 |
| Ecuador | 1966 | 2 | 0 |
| Ecuador | 1969 | 4 | 0 |
| Total | | 21 | 0 |
