= Charles Issawi =

Egyptian academic (1916–2000)

Charles Philip Issawi (Arabic: تشارلز فيليب عيسوي; 1916 – 2000) was an Egyptian-American economist and historian of the Middle East at Columbia University and Princeton University in the United States. Roger Owen, the A. J. Meyer Professor of Middle East History at Harvard, stated that Issawi, "was the father of the study of the modern economic history of the Middle East."

== Life ==
Issawi was born in 1916 in Cairo, Egypt, to Greek Orthodox, Syrian parents. Issawi studied at Victoria College in Alexandria, and read philosophy, politics, and economics at Magdalen College, Oxford. He worked for the Egyptian government from 1937 to 1943. Issawi taught at the American University of Beirut from 1943 to 1947. He joined Columbia University in 1951 and became the Ragnar Nurkse Professor of Economics. He also was the director of the Near and Middle East Institute at Columbia. From 1975 until he retired in 1986, he was the Bayard E. Dodge Professor of Near Eastern Studies at Princeton University. From 1987 to 1991, he was an adjunct professor of economics at New York University.

== Death ==
Charles Issawi died on December 8, 2000, at the age of 84.

== Books ==
- Egypt: An Economic and Social Analysis (1947)
- Egypt at Mid-Century (1954)
- Egypt in Revolution: an economic analysis (Greenwood Press, 1963)
- The Economic History of the Middle East 1800–1914. A book of readings. (University of Chicago Press, 1966)
- The economic history of Iran, 1800–1914 (University of Chicago Press, 1971)
- Issawi's Laws of Social Motion (Hawthorn Books, 1973)
- Oil, the Middle East, and the world (Library Press, 197)
- History of the Middle East and North Africa (Columbia University Press, 1982)
