= Mario Torres Gázquez =

Spanish businessman

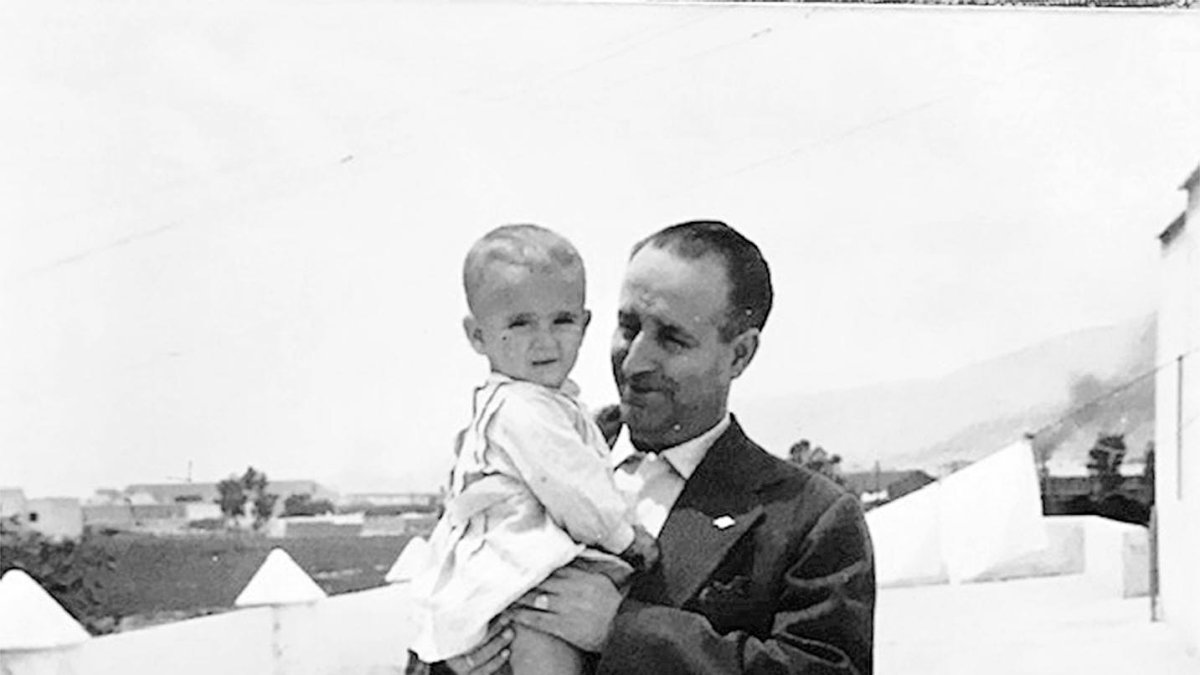
Mario Torres Gázquez in 1970s

Mario Torres Gázquez was a Spanish businessman born in Berja who established a department store and a shopping mall in Almería named Bazar Almería.

It operated in the province of Almería since 1950s: he opened a branch office in December 1948 in the ground floor of a ramshackle house, where in 1949 he sold radio receivers, G.A.C. bicycles, Montesa motorcycles and in 1954 the Derbi ones. In March 1957 he got the permission to build a ten-storey building with a basement which was located on Navarro Rodrigo street in Paseo de Almería. The branch office was opened in November 1957, and it was finished between February and December 1968.

In November 1957 he opened a new shop in calle de Ricardos. He distributed products from Telefunken company, between 1950 and 1958 he distributed Iberia Radio in Almería, and in 1958 he brought the first television sets in the province. He also sold derbies for women, pressure cookers, electrical appliances (washing machines, vacuum cleaners, radio receivers, refrigerators, sewing machines), etc. Between 1951 and 1952 he promoted Unión Deportiva Almería recruiting in Tercera División to climb to Segunda División, and he collaborated with the radio program Coser y cantar.

In 1963 he had three shops in Almería and another in El Ejido, where he distributed Westinghouse fridges.

It was closed before 2008, and nowadays it works as multi-family building with a basement, ground floor, nine floors and the attic.

On 21 December 1930 he got married with Carmen Guerrero Sánchez at Santiago Church.
