= Arnold Hutschnecker =

Austrian-American psychiatrist

Arnold Aaron Hutschnecker
- Born: May 13, 1898
- Died: December 28, 2000 (aged 102); Sherman, Connecticut, U.S.
- Education: Humboldt University
- Medical career
- Profession: Doctor

Arnold Aaron Hutschnecker (13 May 1898 – 28 December 2000) was an Austrian-American medical doctor with a specialisation in psychiatry.

== Early life and education ==
Hutschnecker was born and grew up in Austria. He served in the Austro-Hungarian Army during World War I. He then studied medicine at Humboldt University, Berlin, specialized in psychiatry.

== Career ==
Hutschnecker opened a medical practice in Berlin. He became a vocal critic of Adolf Hitler's National Socialist government. He emigrated to the United States in 1938 and settled in New York City, where he obtained a licence to practice internal medicine and psychiatry.

Among his patients was Richard Nixon. He also advised Nixon on child care policy, presenting a plan promoting daycare for preschool children in lower economic neighborhoods.

He also developed a reputation and wrote articles on the psychology of leadership, and advised Gerald Ford. He published a number of books, of which The Will to Live became a bestseller.

Hutschnecker was in the news when he wrote that politicians should be required to take a psychiatric examination before running for office. He also suggested that all children be given a test to determine the likelihood of criminal behavior.

Hutschnecker died 28 December 2000, in Sherman, Connecticut.

== Publications ==
- The Will to Live, Prentice-Hall 1951.
- Love and Hate in Human Nature, Crowell, 1955.
- The Drive for Power, M.Evans and Comp. 1974
