= Michael Schumann =

German philosophy professor

- Born: 24 September 1946; Zella-Mehlis, Thuringia, Germany
- Died: 2 December 2000 (aged 54) near Gransee, Brandenburg, Germany
- Occupations: Philosophy Professor; Politician
- Political party: SED; PDS
- Spouse: Ingeburg Reuß/Schumann
- Children: Marco
- Parent(s): Erwin & Margarete Schumann

Michael Schumann (24 September 1946 – 2 December 2000) was a German philosophy professor who became an East German advocate for reform and a politician during the build-up to German reunification. He is widely seen as a pioneer of the Party of Democratic Socialism which superseded the Socialist Unity Party in the German Democratic Republic in 1989/90.

== Life ==
Schumann was born in the Soviet occupation zone of what remained of Germany, slightly more than a year after the Second World War had ended in defeat and regime change. His birthplace was Zella-Mehlis, a small industrial town some 65 km (40 miles) south-west of Erfurt. His father, Erwin Schumann, worked as a foreman. Long before he was old enough for school, the Soviet occupation zone had reinvented itself, formally in October 1949, as the Soviet sponsored German Democratic Republic, which involved a return to one-party dictatorship, this time with constitutional arrangements modeled on those of the Soviet Union itself. Michael Schumann attended primary and secondary schools locally, passing his school final exams in 1965. In parallel with this, 1965 was also the year in which he obtained a certificate of expertise in cattle breeding from the VEB agricultural cooperative in nearby Rohr.

Between 1965 and 1970 he studied Philosophy at the "Karl Marx University" (as it was then known) in Leipzig. A defining influence during his first year of study was the philosophical school of his tutor, Helmut Seidel.

In 1967, the year of his twenty-first birthday, Schumann joined East Germany's ruling Socialist Unity Party of Germany (SED /Sozialistische Einheitspartei Deutschlands). Although he would later come to prominence at a party conference late in 1989 because of his critical attitude to the direction taken by East Germany under the SED, he would remain a member of the party, and then of its successor entity, for the rest of his life. He received his doctorate in 1970 for work on Hegel. His first job after this was as a research assistant in the Marxism–Leninism section of the Philosophy Department at the party's own "Walter Ulbricht" Academy for Law and Political Sciences in Potsdam-Babelsberg, which placed him at the heart of one of the SED's most important cadre schools. Until 1989, albeit with a couple of breaks, the Academy would be his political and academic home in the years preceding his emergence as a politician.

From November 1970 till April 1972 Schumann performed his Military Service in the National People's Army, reaching the rank of junior officer in a political section. It was during this period that he married Ingeburg Reuß who was at the time employed on the commercial side by DEFA, the state-owned film studin. He had a son, Marco.

Back in the academic world, in 1986 he was appointed to a full professorship at the Walter Ulbricht Academy.

He is remembered for the frequently repeated assertion, "We break irrevocably with Stalinism as a system!", which he delivered to the extraordinary SED Party Conference of 16 December 1989. As matters turned out it would be the last SED conference before the party began its slightly awkward conversion process into the Party of Democratic Socialism (PDS) in preparation for a democratic future which after the events of the previous month was widely anticipated. The resolution, which marked a break with the government by dictatorship that had controlled the German Democratic Republic for more than four decades, was created by several people, including the Stasi Intelligence Chief Markus Wolf and the politician Heinz Vietze, but it was Schumann's part in its authorship that was given greater prominence precisely because, some said, Wolf and Vietze were both highly positioned members of the now largely discredited East Germany political establishment whereas Schumann's party work had been low level and peripheral to his career. To have a chance of survival, the party would need to undergo a new beginning appropriate to a new kind of East Germany.

On 18 March 1990 the German Democratic Republic conducted its first — and as matters turned out, only — free parliamentary election. Michael Schumann was elected a member of the National Legislature (Volkskammer). Following reunification in October of that year he sat as a member of the German Bundestag till December. 1990 also marked a return for regional government in what had been East Germany, and in the 1990 Brandenburg state election Schumann was returned as one of the 13 PDS Assembly members, retaining his seat till his death in December 2000 after which his former seat went to Gerrit Große. From 1989 till October 2000 Schumann was also a member of the PDS National Executive.

Michael and Ingeburg Schumann were killed in a road traffic accident near Gransee (Brandenburg) on 2 December 2000. They are buried in the cemetery at Bornstedt (Potsdam).
