= Mario Torres (Chilean footballer) =

Chilean footballer (1931-1975)

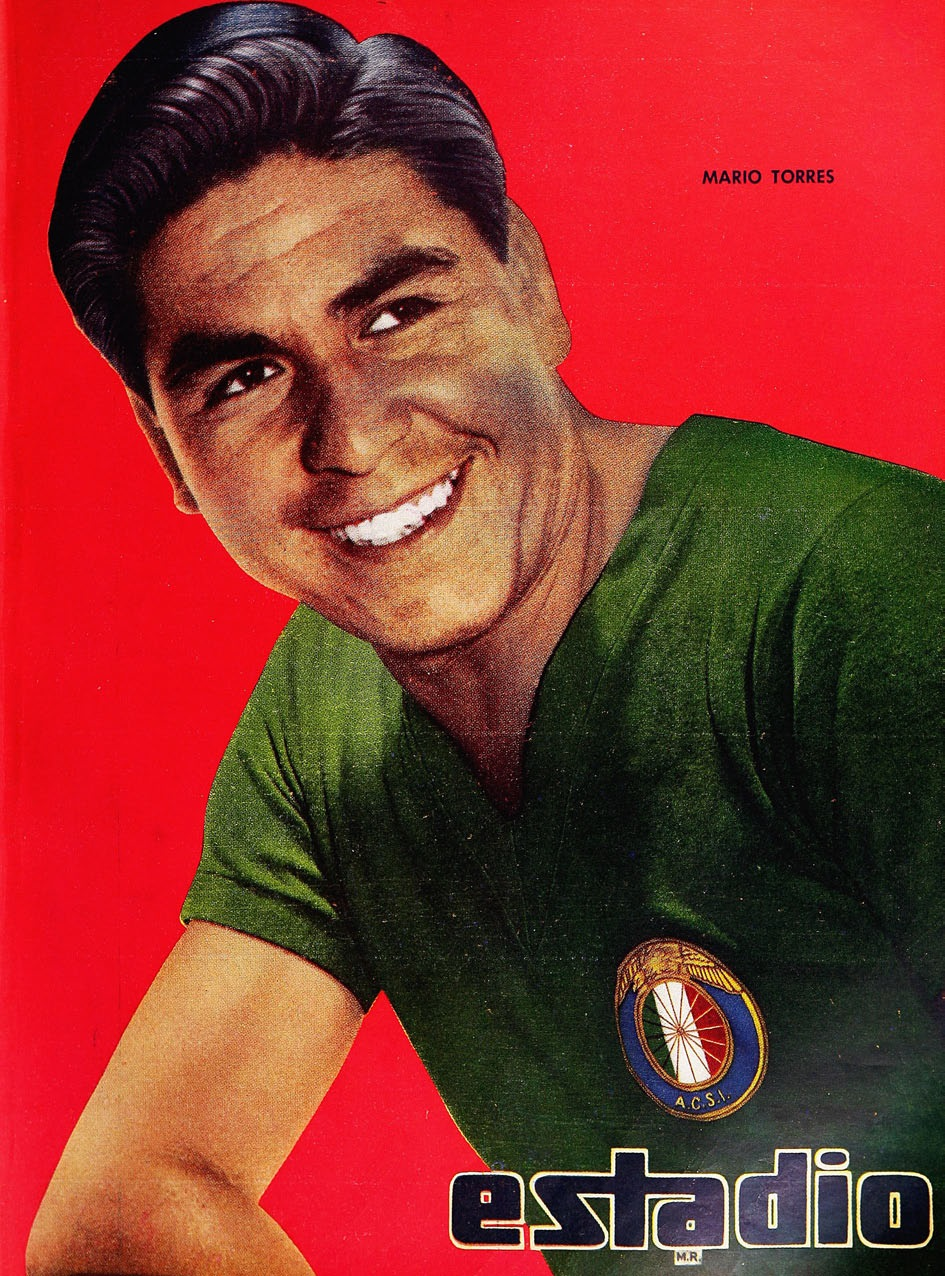

Personal information
- Full name: Mario Alberto Torres Hernández
- Date of birth: 20 June 1931
- Date of death: 26 April 1975 (aged 43)
- Position: Defender

International career
Years	Team	Apps	(Gls)
1954–1959	Chile	11	(0)

Mario Alberto Torres Hernández (20 June 1931 – 26 April 1975) was a Chilean footballer. He played in 11 matches for the Chile national football team from 1954 to 1959. He was also part of Chile's squad for the 1957 South American Championship.
