= Daniel Morales (Chilean footballer) =

Chilean footballer (1928-2007)

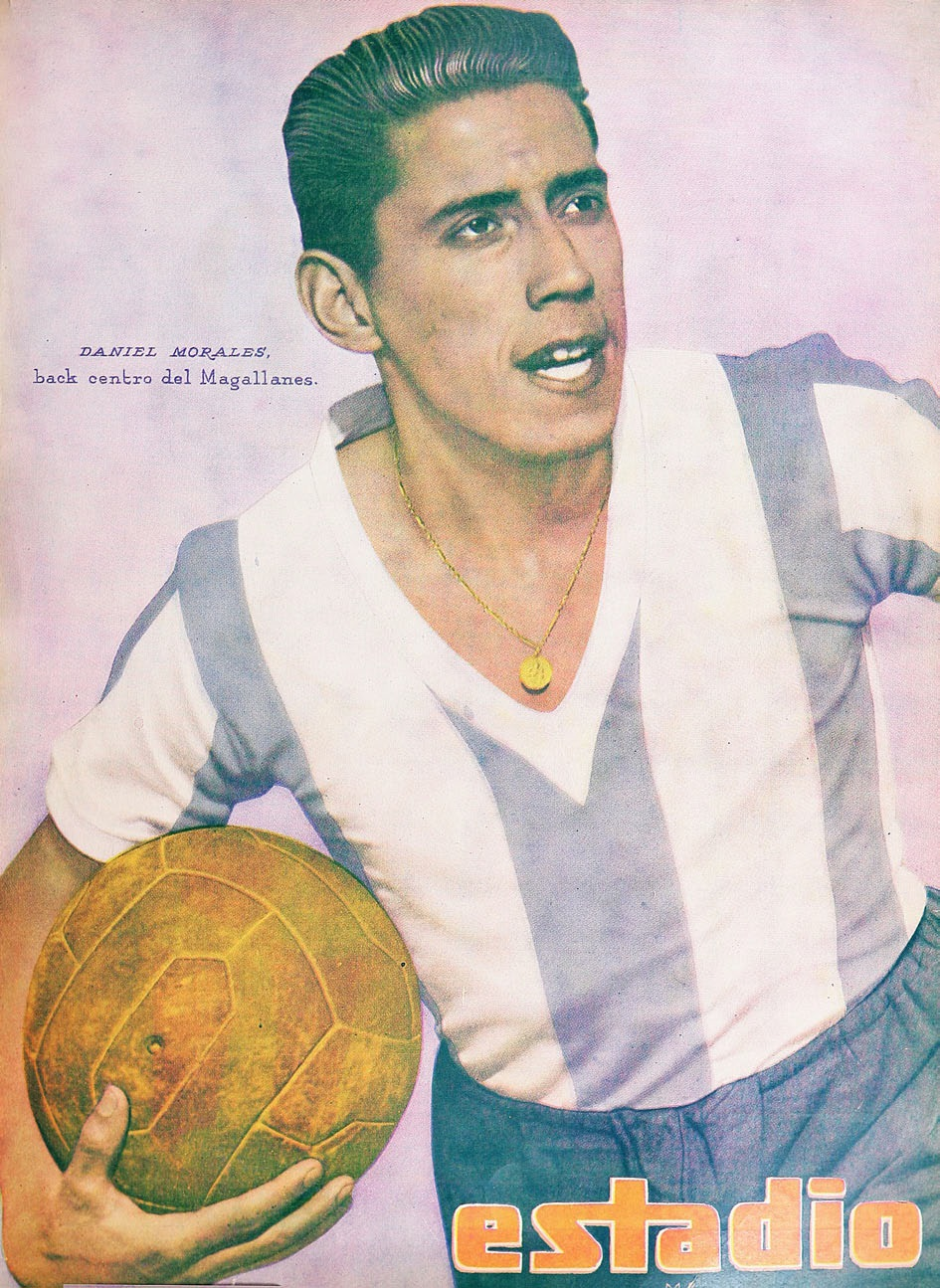

Personal information
- Date of birth: 23 April 1928
- Date of death: 5 August 2007 (aged 79)
- Position: Defender

International career
Years	Team	Apps	(Gls)
1950-1957	Chile	3	(0)

Daniel Morales (23 April 1928 – 5 August 2007) was a Chilean footballer. He played in three matches for the Chile national football team in 1957. He was also part of Chile's squad for the 1957 South American Championship.
