= Clarence Dybvig =

American politician

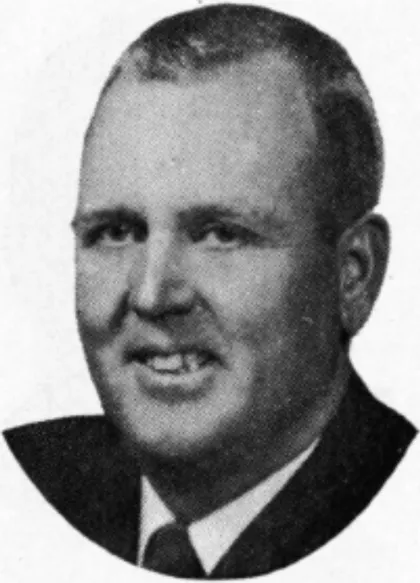
- Dybvig in 1969

Member of the South Dakota House of Representatives
- In office 1969–1970

Personal details
- Born: June 3, 1919
- Died: December 13, 2000 (aged 81)
- Party: Republican
- Education: St. Olaf College; South Dakota State University

Clarence Dybvig (June 13, 1919 – December 13, 2000) was an American politician. He served as a Republican member of the South Dakota House of Representatives.

== Life and career ==
Dybvig attended St. Olaf College and South Dakota State University.

In 1969, Dybvig was appointed to the South Dakota House of Representatives.

Dybvig died on December 13, 2000, of cancer, at the age of 81.
