= Juan Giménez (footballer) =

Argentine footballer (1927–2000)

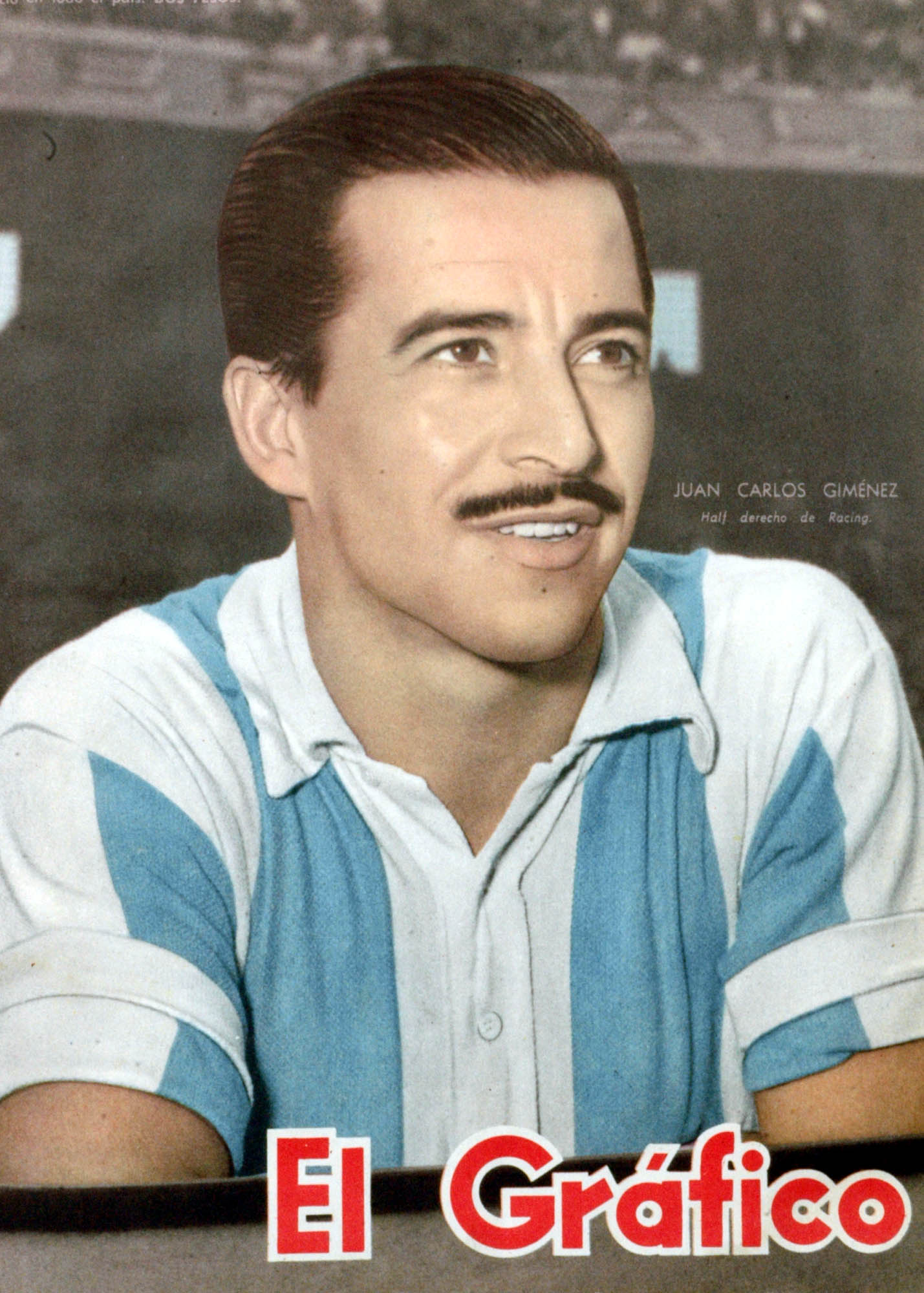

Personal information
- Date of birth: 16 February 1927
- Place of birth: Buenos Aires, Argentina
- Date of death: 29 December 2000 (aged 73)
- Place of death: Buenos Aires, Argentina
- Position: Defender

Senior career*
Years	Team	Apps	(Gls)
1946-1950	Huracán	45	(?)
1951-1957	Racing Club	170	(?)
- Banfield
- Oriente

International career
1956–1957	Argentina	11	(0)

Managerial career
- 1967: Argentina U20
- Racing Club (caretaker)
- 1971-1972: Ferro Carril Oeste (caretaker)
- FAS
- Municipal
Medal record
Representing Argentina
Copa América
Winner	1957 Peru
- * Club domestic league appearances and goals

Juan Carlos Giménez (16 February 1927 – 29 December 2000) was an Argentine footballer. He was part of Argentina's squad which won the 1957 South American Championship. Giménez died in Buenos Aires on 29 December 2000, at the age of 73.
