= Francisco Cano Consuegra =

Spanish politician (1955 – 2000)

Councillor of the Viladecavalls City Council
- In office 13 June 1999 – 14 December 2000

Personal details
- Born: 21 March 1955 La Carolina, Spain
- Died: 14 December 2000 (aged 45) Terrassa, Spain
- Party: People's Party
- Occupation: Plumber

Francisco Cano Consuegra (21 March 1955 – 14 December 2000) was a town councillor of the People's Party (PP) in Viladecavalls when he was assassinated by the Basque separatist group ETA.

== Biography ==
Francisco Cano Consuegra had a plumbing small business and was also a local councillor for the People's Party in the town of Viladecaballs. He was married and had two daughters. Francisco was killed at the age of 45 years old.

=== Murder ===
The Gaztelugatxe command or Barcelona had a new target, Francisco Cano Consuegra. The group obtained information on the councillor through the press and the internet. Two ETA members, Fernando García Jodrá and Lierni Armendáriz González de Langarika, watched Francisco Cano at his home and in the plumbing shop. The early morning of 14 December 2000, Lierni Armendaritz and García Jodrá went to Francisco Cano's place.

The councillor parked his Citroën C-15 van in his private parking lot about 1:45 a.m. The militant, Lierni Armendáriz, forced the vehicle's tailgate lock with a screwdriver while García Jodrá placed the limpet bomb inside with one kilo of explosive material. On December 14, 2000, Francisco Cano Consuegra left his home, around 7:45 a.m., on his way to the plumbing workshop. He took his vehicle and stopped for breakfast on the road from Olesa to Montserrat. Afterwards, he followed his work routines while driving his car. At approximately 10:50 a.m., the bomb exploded with a force heard from a mile away. The bomb left him severely injured. The car was scattered within a radius of 30 metres

The local police and ambulance arrived at the scene immediately. Cano asked for help and bled from the head and back while the vital signs remained constant. He was transferred to Tarrasa Mutual Hospital in critical condition with brain trauma and burst in the gluteal-lumbosacral and peritoneal area. After an intervention to stop the bleeding caused by the explosion, his death was certified at 1:45 p.m.

Lierni Armendáriz González de Langarica, Fernando García Jodrá, Laura Riera and Zigor Larredonda were processed for these events in 2003. The Section Letter of the Criminal Chamber of the National Court ruled in November 2004. Lierni Armendáriz González de Langarica and Fernando García Jodrá were sentenced to 47 years of jail. However, Laura Riera and Zigor Larredonda were absolved. After this attack, there was no specific claim made by ETA.

=== See also ===
- (in Spanish) Anex:Asesinatos cometidos por ETA desde la muerte de Francisco Franco

=== General ===
- This article makes use of material translated from the corresponding article in the Spanish-language Wikipedia.

== Bibliography ==
- MERINO, A., CHAPA, A., Roots of liberty. pp. 217–223. FPEV (2011). ISBN 978-84-615-0648-4
