= Myriel Davies =

Welsh peace activist (1920–2000)

Myriel Davies OBE
- Born: Myriel Irfona Morgan; 5 March 1920; Swansea, Glamorgan, Wales
- Died: 20 December 2000 (aged 80)
- Occupation: Peace activist
- Employer: United Nations Association – UK
- Spouse: Max Davies (m. 1952)

Myriel Irfona Davies OBE (5 March 1920 – 20 December 2000) was a Welsh peace activist. After an early career as a telephone operator, she joined the United Nations Association – UK during the 1956 Suez Crisis, later serving as their deputy director and London regional secretary until 1988.

== Biography ==
Myriel Irfona Davies was born on 5 March 1920 in Swansea to Sarah Jane (née Jones) and Congregational minister David Morgan, and educated at Whitland Grammar School (now Ysgol Dyffryn Taf School). During her early career, she was a telephone operator, working for the General Post Office in Carmarthen and Shrewsbury, the latter where she worked as chief telephonist until her marriage to journalist and socialist Max Davies in 1952, and later at the London location of the Selfridges department store.

Davies became part of the United Nations Association – UK in 1956 while the Suez Crisis was taking place. Subsequently, she became their London chapter's campaigns officer and regional secretary, and the nationwide association's deputy director, holding the latter two positions until 1988. Davies, who was known to be "a Christian of conviction", became a deacon in 1968, served as secretary of Radnor Walk Independent Church, Chelsea, London, in 1982 until her death, and served as president of the Union of Welsh Independents in 1994.

Davies believed in nonviolent action and individuality, and emphasized the ideas of disarmament and peace when discussing Christian issues as Union of Welsh Independents president. She also appeared on such media outlets as BBC Radio Cymru and S4C as an expert on issues through a United Nations lens. T. Hefin Jones said that "she always [spoke to the media] in a balanced and thorough way" and also described her as "an outstanding speaker whose conviction made a profound impression on her listeners." Davies was a speaker at the 1989 Conference of Professions for World Disarmament and Development. Among her travels were a visit to South Africa months after the end of apartheid and personal observations of malnutrition in Bangladesh and poverty in Greece.

Davies was made a Member of the Order of the British Empire at the 1978 New Year Honours in her capacity as regional officer of the United Nations Association's London chapter. She was made an honorary member of Gorsedd Cymru in 1983. She was made an Officer of the Order of the British Empire in 2000.

From 1978, Davies lived in St Clears. She was fluent in Welsh. Her elder brother Herbert Myrddin Morgan was a chemist based in St Clears.

Davies died on 20 December 2000. She was cremated and interred in Gibeon Chapel Cemetery, Bancyfelin.
