= Stanley Blacker =

American fashion designer

Stanley Blacker was a fashion designer who established his company, Stanley Blacker Inc. in 1955 and favored the moniker "Mr. Sportcoats". He was among the first to sew his name on clothes (sports coats, initially) and advertise them nationally. By doing so, he contributed to the creation of the designer trend.

His label today is supported by 14 licensees worldwide who manufacture moderately priced fashion apparel for men and women. Items include raincoats, topcoats, outerwear, leather & suede jackets, loungewear, scarves & gloves, hats, Shoes, accessories, luggage, and cologne.

== Early life ==
He was born in New York. His father was Morris Blacker, an owner of clothing maker Blacker Brothers. He studied business at New York University and design at the Philadelphia Textile School. He served in the army in World War II and joined his father's firm after he returned. When Morris died, Stanley sold his interest in that firm to start his own.

== Personal life ==
He was married to Jean Valente, but that ended in divorce. He was originally married to Betty Blacker, mother of Gail and Patricia. Later and to his death, his companion was Vivienne Stevens. He had three daughters, Patricia, Gail, and Lauren, and one son, David.

Stanley was a philanthropist and served as a trustee of the Metropolitan Synagogue of New York for over 20 years.

He died December 30, 2000, aged 79, at New York University Medical Center.
