= Guy-Pierre Volpert =

French ice hockey player

Personal information
- Nationality: French
- Born: 10 November 1916; Paris, France
- Died: 26 December 2000 (aged 84); Fontainebleau, France

Sport
- Sport: Ice hockey

Guy Henri Georges "Guy-Pierre" Volpert (10 November 1916 – 26 December 2000) was a French ice hockey player. He competed in the men's tournament at the 1936 Winter Olympics.
