= Daniel Morales (swimmer) =

Spanish swimmer

Personal information
- Born: Daniel Morales Robert; 10 March 1977 (age 49) Granollers, Spain

Sport
- Sport: Swimming

Daniel Morales (born 10 March 1977) is a Spanish former swimmer who competed in the 2000 Summer Olympics.
