= Jaime Galarza =

Ecuadorian footballer (1934–2013)

Personal information
- Full name: Jaime Washington Galarza Delgado
- Date of birth: 7 November 1934
- Place of birth: Guayaquil, Ecuador
- Date of death: 7 December 2013 (aged 79)
- Position: Defender

International career
Years	Team	Apps	(Gls)
1963	Ecuador	5	(0)

Jaime Washington Galarza Delgado (7 November 1934 – 7 December 2013) was an Ecuadorian footballer. He played in five matches for the Ecuador national football team in 1963. He was also part of Ecuador's squad for the 1963 South American Championship. Galarza died on 7 December 2013, at the age of 79.
