= Juan Alberto Castro =

Argentine footballer (1934–1979)

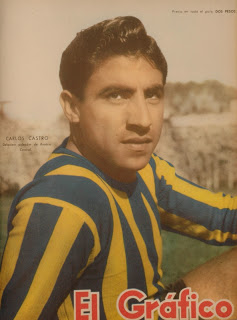
- Castro in 1956

Personal information
- Date of birth: 12 June 1934
- Place of birth: Córdoba, Argentina
- Date of death: 12 July 1979 (aged 45)
- Position: Forward

International career
Years	Team	Apps	(Gls)
1957	Argentina	2	(1)

Juan Alberto Castro (12 June 1934 – 12 July 1979) was an Argentine footballer who played as a forward. He made two appearances for the Argentina national team in 1957. He was also part of Argentina's squad for the 1957 South American Championship.
