= Vladimir Kabo =

- Born: Moscow
- Died: May 29, 2009; Canberra
- Alma mater: MSU Faculty of History
- Occupation: Anthropologist
- Spouse(s): Elena Govor
- Awards: Order of the Red Star; NN Miklukho-Maklay Prize (1978)
- Website: http://aboriginals.narod.ru/, https://vladimirkabo.com/

Vladimir Rafailovich Kabo (Russian: Владимир Рафаилович Кабо; 1925, in Moscow – 2009, in Canberra) was a Soviet and Australian ethnographer with a special interest in the religion and culture of the Australian Aborigines and other prehistorical societies. He was a Doctor nauk in Historical Sciences (1970), and the author of seven books. From 1957 to 1990 he worked at the Institute of Anthropology and Ethnography, Leningrad & (from 1977) Moscow.

== Early life ==
His friend was Yuri Bregel, and their fathers were professors and co-authors. Kabo was a participant in the World War II on Eastern Front from 1944 and awarded the Order of the Red Star. He suffered from Stalin's repression, but in 1956 he was rehabilitated. He was influenced by the Orthodox priest John Krestiankin.

== Education ==
Kabo graduated with honors from the MSU Faculty of History in 1956, and earned his Candidat degree in 1962. He was a student of Sergei Tokarev. He was also taught by Professors Nikolai Rubinshtein and Sergei Bakhrushin. In 1970, he defended his doctoral thesis (based on his first book), at Institute of Anthropology and Ethnography.

== Work ==
In 1969 Kabo published his first book, «Происхождение и ранняя история аборигенов Австралии». From 1960 to 1990 he taught at the Saint Petersburg State University. He published in Etnograficheskoe Obozrenie. Lev Gumilev argued with him.

== Personal life ==
He was a distant relative of Joel Engel. Kabo was married twice, first to Valentina in 1958. They had a daughter.

His second wife was Artyom Vesyoly granddaughter, whom he married in 1983. They had one son.

Kabo was friends with Deborah Bird Rose and Kate Rigby.

== Migration ==
In the summer of 1989 he and his wife emigrated to Australia.
