= Carlos Verdejo =

Chilean footballer (1934–2017)

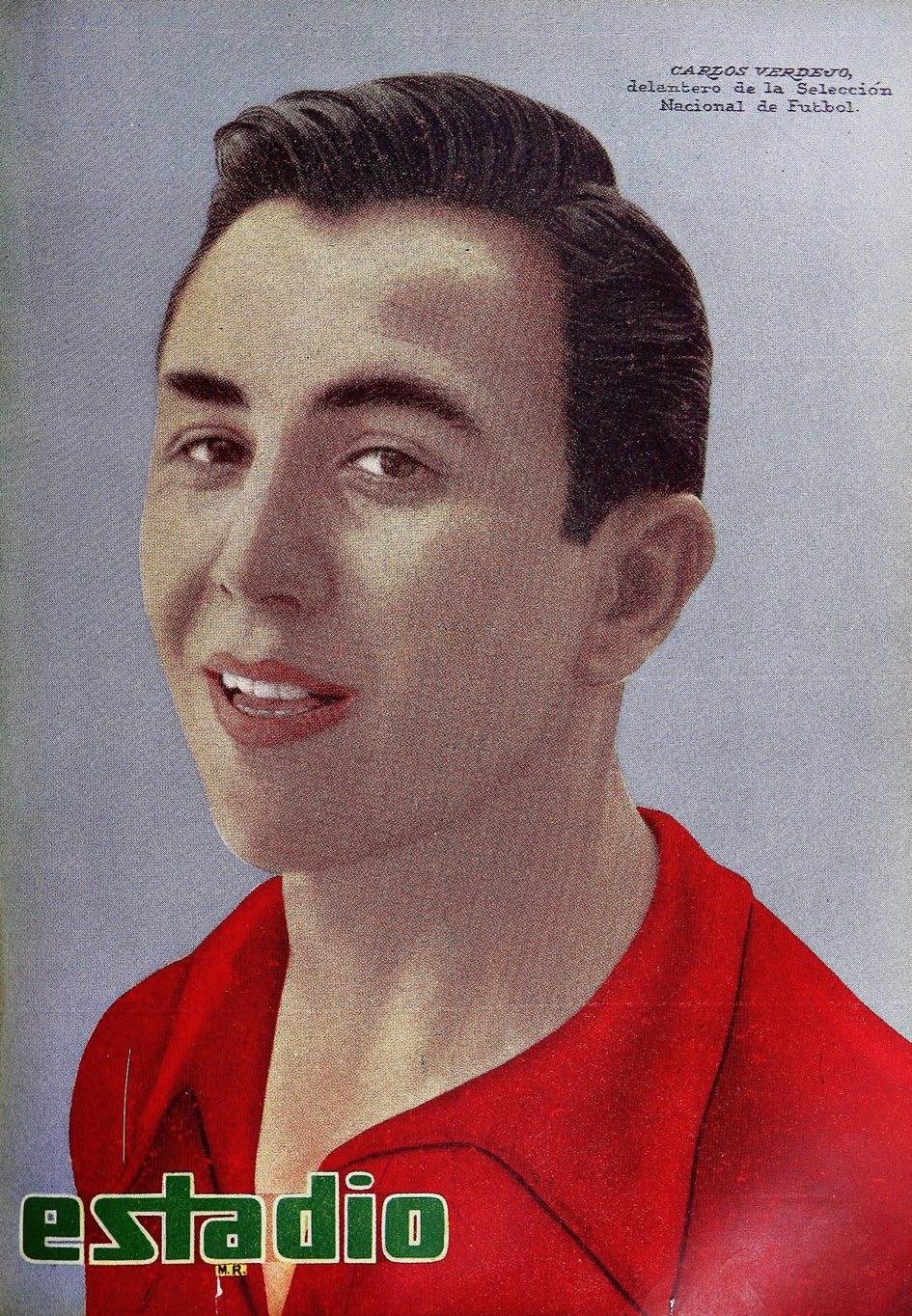
- in Estadio 1956

Personal information
- Full name: Carlos Enrique Verdejo Peralta
- Date of birth: 2 October 1934
- Place of birth: Valparaíso, Chile
- Date of death: 24 January 2017 (aged 82)
- Place of death: Viña del Mar, Chile
- Position: Forward

Youth career
- Deportivo Los Placeres
- Orompello
- Everton

Senior career*
Years	Team	Apps	(Gls)
1953–1956	Everton		
1957–1963	Deportes La Serena		
1964	Palestino	34	(11)
1965	Santiago Wanderers	24	(10)
1967	Everton	18	(2)

International career
1957–1964	Chile	6	(3)
- * Club domestic league appearances and goals

Carlos Enrique Verdejo Peralta (2 October 1934 – 24 January 2017) was a Chilean footballer who played as a forward.

== Career ==
Born in Valparaíso, Chile, Verdejo was with local clubs Deportivo Los Placeres and Orompello as a youth player.

During his career, Verdejo played for Everton de Viña del Mar, Deportes La Serena, Palestino and Santiago Wanderers. He ended his career with Everton in 1967.

On 6 April 1965, Verdejo was one of the constituent footballers of SIFUP, the trade union of professionales footballers in Chile, alongside fellows such as Gustavo Cortés, Juan Toro, José Donoso, among others.

== Personal life ==
Following his retirement, Verdejo settled in the United States.

== Honours ==
Deportes La Serena

- Segunda División: 1957
- Copa Chile: 1960

Individual

- Campeonato Nacional (Chile) Top-Scorer: 1958
