= Osvaldo Cruz (footballer) =

Argentine footballer (1931–2023)

Osvaldo Héctor Cruz
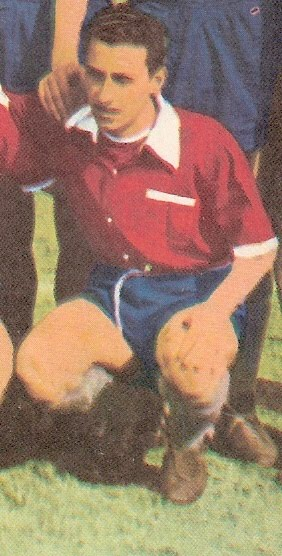

Personal information
- Date of birth: 29 May 1931
- Place of birth: Buenos Aires, Argentina
- Date of death: 20 March 2023 (aged 91)
- Height: 1.68 m (5 ft 6 in)

Senior career*
Years	Team	Apps	(Gls)
1951–1960	Independiente	222	(43)
1960–1961	Palmeiras		
1961	Independiente	13	(1)
1962–1964	Unión Española		

International career
1953–1958	Argentina	22	(3)
- * Club domestic league appearances and goals

Osvaldo Héctor Cruz (29 May 1931 – 20 March 2023) was an Argentine footballer who played as a forward for clubs in Argentina, Brazil and Chile; and in the Argentina national team in the 1958 FIFA World Cup in Sweden.

Cruz died on 20 March 2023, at the age of 91.

== Honours ==
Independiente

- Primera División runner-up: 1954

Palmeiras

- Campeonato Brasileiro: 1960

Argentina

- Copa América: 1955 and 1957
