= Sergio Espinosa =

Chilean footballer (1928-2015)

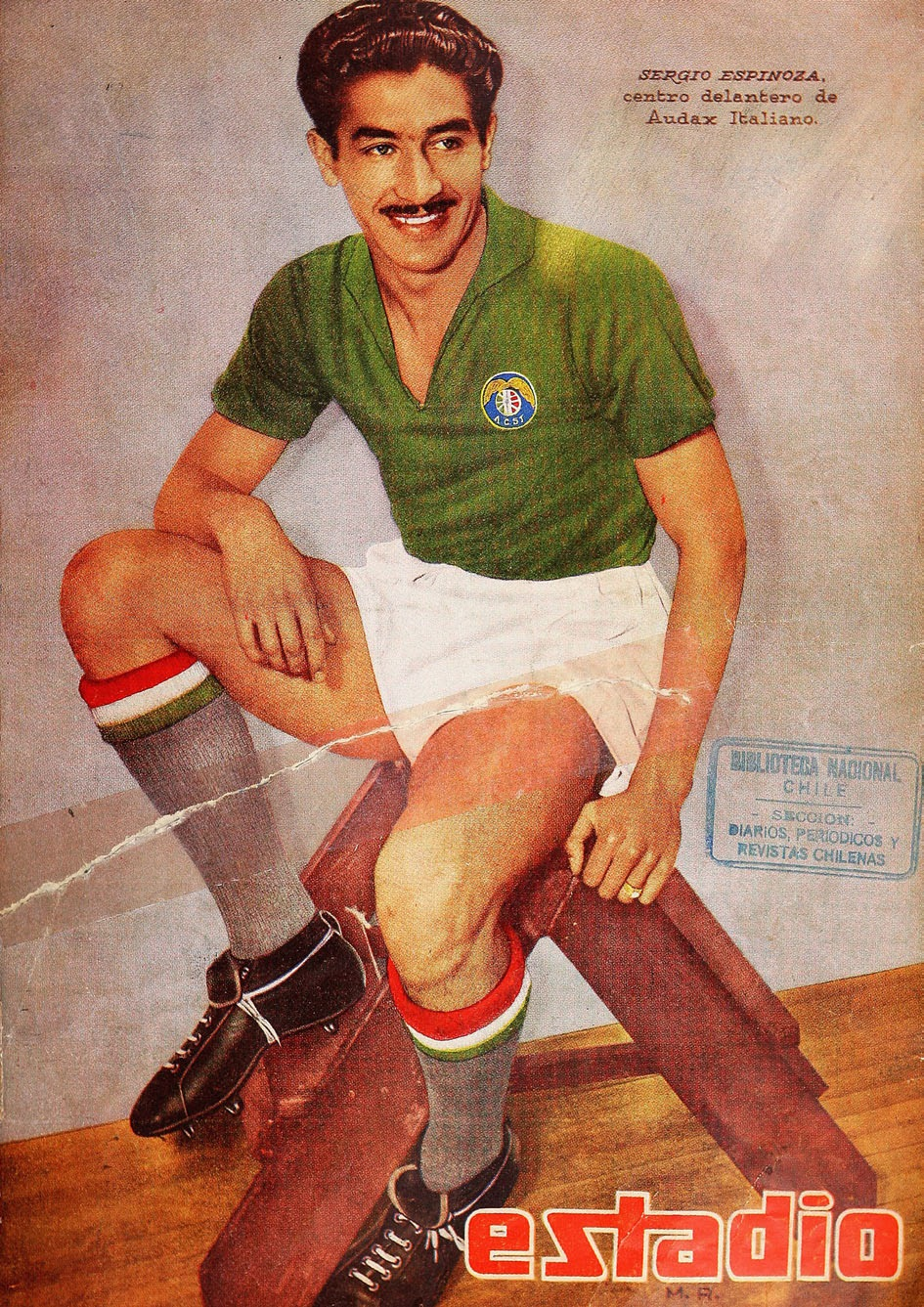

Personal information
- Date of birth: 25 December 1928
- Date of death: 10 August 2015 (aged 86)
- Position: Forward

Senior career*
Years	Team	Apps	(Gls)
- Audax Italiano

International career
1953–1957	Chile	7	(1)
- * Club domestic league appearances and goals

Sergio Espinosa (25 December 1928 – 10 August 2015) was a Chilean footballer. He played in seven matches for the Chile national football team from 1953 to 1957. He was also part of Chile's squad for the 1953 South American Championship.
