= Toshiyasu Ishige =

Japanese sport shooter (born 1932)

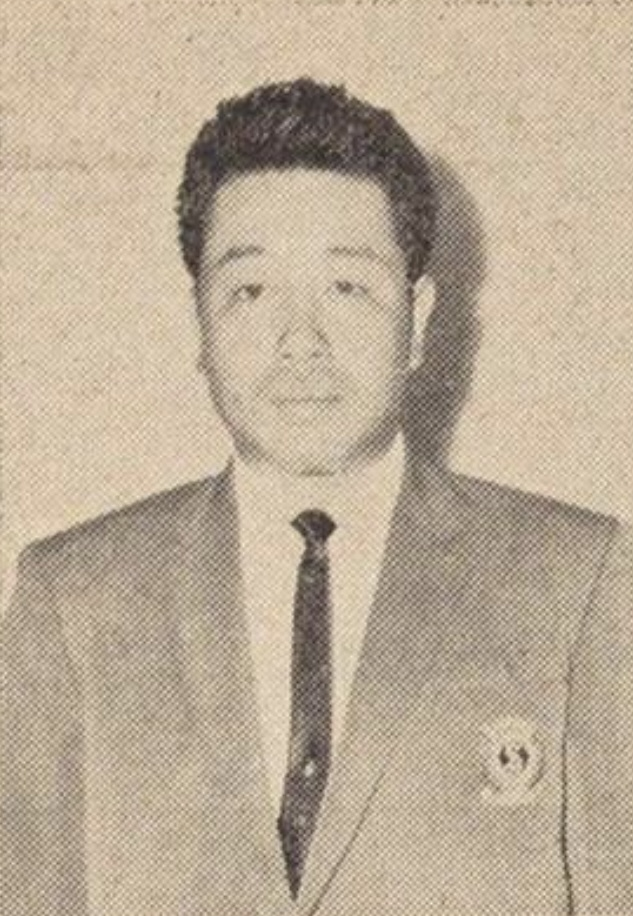

Personal information
- Born: 16 January 1932
- Died: 27 December 2000 (aged 68)

Sport
- Sport: Sports shooting

Toshiyasu Ishige (石下 年安, Ishige Toshiyasu; 16 January 1932 – 27 December 2000) was a Japanese sport shooter who competed in the 1964 Summer Olympics and in the 1976 Summer Olympics.
