= 1957 South American Championship =

Tournament details
- Host country: Peru
- Dates: 7 March – 6 April
- Teams: 7 (from 1 confederation)
- Venue: 1 (in 1 host city)

Final positions
- Champions: Argentina (11th title)
- Runners-up: Brazil
- Third place: Uruguay
- Fourth place: Peru

Tournament statistics
- Matches played: 21
- Goals scored: 101 (4.81 per match)
- Top scorer(s): (Uruguay) Javier Ambrois (Argentina) Humberto Maschio (9 goals each)

The South American Championship 1957 was a football tournament held in Peru and won by Argentina with Brazil as runners-up. Bolivia, and Paraguay withdrew from the tournament.

Humberto Maschio from Argentina and Javier Ambrois from Uruguay became top scorers of the tournament with 9 goals each.

== Summary ==
Managed by Guillermo Stábile, Argentina won the tournament with a team widely considered one of the best squads in its history, and the first "legendary team" of Argentina since its inception in 1901. The attacking line (nicknamed Carasucias) was composed of Omar Corbatta, Humberto Maschio, Antonio Angelillo, Enrique Sívori and Osvaldo Cruz. Beyond its virtues and high goalscoring (25 goals in 6 matches), Argentina was a well-balanced team with a strong defense with Pedro Dellacha and Néstor Rossi as two of its most notable players that helped the team to finish the competition with the fewest goals conceded.

Despite Argentina having won other South American competitions before, the 1957 Sudamericano was the first Argentine achievement with a great repercussion on the media. Likewise, Sívori was chosen as the best player of the tournament.

Because of their great performances, Maschio, Angelillo and Sívori would be traded to Italian clubs (Bologna, Internazionale and Juventus respectively) after the tournament, losing the chance to play the FIFA World Cup held in Sweden one year later, due to the AFA interventor, Raúl Colombo, not calling them for the national team considering that "we are plenty of players here".

People always remember us. Maybe we played just a few matches and that South American championship still remains in their memory. Despite we had played some friendly matches before travelling Peru, people almost could not see us play in our country.

— Humberto Maschio in an interview with Clarín, 2007

Corbatta was a phenomenal player. He did impossible things. He was crazy, but about football. When he dribbled it seemed that rivals could never take the ball away from him. He became an idol of Limeños (people from Lima). After the 3–0 win over Brazil, he was acclaimed by the whole attendance, giving his shirt to them as retribution.

— Humberto Maschio

== Squads ==
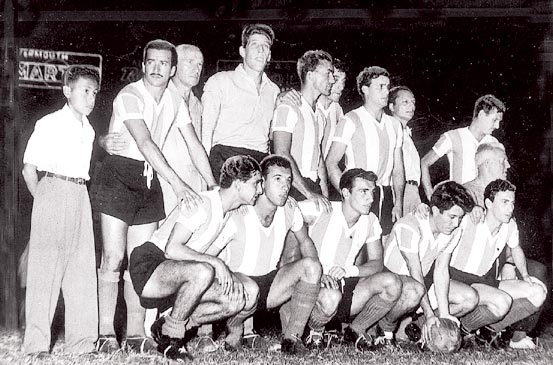
The Argentina winning squad

For a complete list of participating squads see: 1957 South American Championship squads

== Venues ==
Lima
Estadio Nacional de Lima
Capacity: 50,000
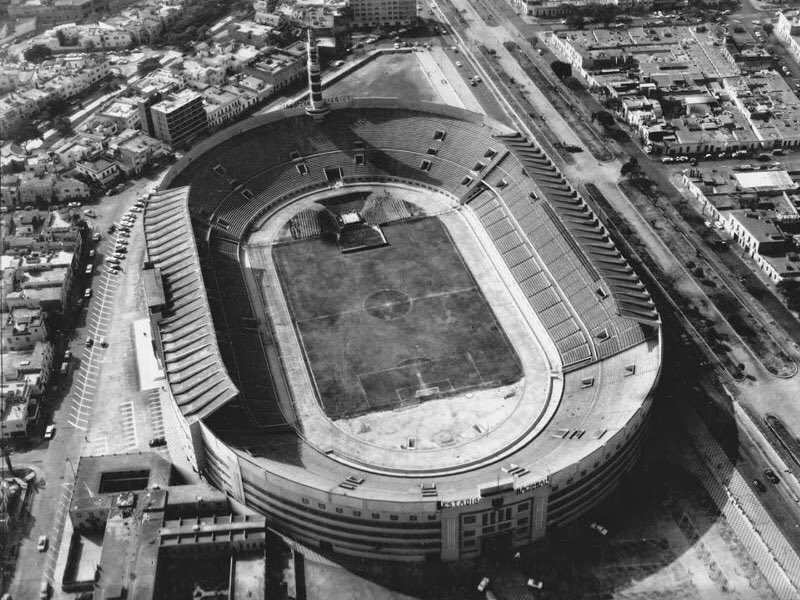

== Final round ==
| Team | Pld | W | D | L | GF | GA | GD | Pts |
|---|---|---|---|---|---|---|---|---|
| Argentina | 6 | 5 | 0 | 1 | 25 | 6 | +19 | 10 |
| Brazil | 6 | 4 | 0 | 2 | 23 | 9 | +14 | 8 |
| Uruguay | 6 | 4 | 0 | 2 | 15 | 12 | +3 | 8 |
| Peru | 6 | 4 | 0 | 2 | 12 | 9 | +3 | 8 |
| Colombia | 6 | 2 | 0 | 4 | 10 | 25 | −15 | 4 |
| Chile | 6 | 1 | 1 | 4 | 9 | 17 | −8 | 3 |
| Ecuador | 6 | 0 | 1 | 5 | 7 | 23 | −16 | 1 |

7 March 1957

| Uruguay | 5–2 | Ecuador |
|---|---|---|
| Ambrois 26', 29' (pen.), 57', 74'; Sasía 87' | | Larraz 12', 40' (pen.) |

Estadio Nacional, Lima
Attendance: 50,000
Referee: Erwin Hieger (Austria)

10 March 1957

| Peru | 2–1 | Ecuador |
|---|---|---|
| Terry 29', 37' (pen.) | | Cantos 44' |

Estadio Nacional, Lima
Attendance: 55,000
Referee: Robert Turner (United Kingdom)

13 March 1957

| Argentina | 8–2 | Colombia |
|---|---|---|
| Cruz 5'; Angelillo 10', 73'; Maschio 16' (pen.), 23', 53' (pen.), 85'; Corbatta 59' | | Gamboa 34' (pen.); Valencia 37' |

Estadio Nacional, Lima
Attendance: 42,000
Referee: Ronald Lynch (United Kingdom)

13 March 1957

| Brazil | 4–2 | Chile |
|---|---|---|
| Didì 20', 26', 44'; Pepe 46' | | Ramírez Banda 13'; Fernández 89' |

Estadio Nacional, Lima
Attendance: 42,000
Referee: Bertley Cross (United Kingdom)

16 March 1957

| Peru | 1–0 | Chile |
|---|---|---|
| Mosquera 57' |

Estadio Nacional, Lima
Attendance: 60,000
Referee: Ronald Lynch (United Kingdom)

17 March 1957

| Colombia | 1–0 | Uruguay |
|---|---|---|
| Arango 28' |

Estadio Nacional, Lima
Attendance: 50,000
Referee: Pedro Di Leo (Italy)

17 March 1957

| Argentina | 3–0 | Ecuador |
|---|---|---|
| Angelillo 5', 39'; Sívori 14' |

Estadio Nacional, Lima
Attendance: 50,000
Referee: Bertley Cross (United Kingdom)

20 March 1957

| Argentina | 4–0 | Uruguay |
|---|---|---|
| Maschio 7', 73'; Angelillo 48'; Sanfilippo 83' |

Estadio Nacional, Lima
Attendance: 40,000
Referee: Erwin Hieger (Austria)

21 March 1957

| Brazil | 7–1 | Ecuador |
|---|---|---|
| Evaristo 22', 89'; Pepe 25'; Zizinho 34' (pen.); Joel 43', 68'; Didì 78' | | Larraz 80' (pen.) |

Estadio Nacional, Lima
Attendance: 45,000
Referee: Ronald Lynch (United Kingdom)

21 March 1957

| Chile | 3–2 | Colombia |
|---|---|---|
| Verdejo 35', 70'; Espinoza 62' | | Arango 68'; Carrillo 83' |

Estadio Nacional, Lima
Attendance: 45,000
Referee: Edwin Hieger (Austria)

23 March 1957

| Uruguay | 5–3 | Peru |
|---|---|---|
| Ambrois 22', 48', 60', 75'; Carranza 26' | | Terry 3'; Seminario 81'; Mosquera 83' |

Estadio Nacional, Lima
Attendance: 55,000
Referee: Bertley Cross (United Kingdom)

24 March 1957

| Chile | 2–2 | Ecuador |
|---|---|---|
| Ramírez Banda 18', 26' (pen.) | | Larraz 25' (pen.); Cantos 59' |

Estadio Nacional, Lima
Attendance: 45,000
Referee: Erwin Hieger (Austria)

24 March 1957

| Brazil | 9–0 | Colombia |
|---|---|---|
| Pepe 27'; Evaristo 41', 44', 45', 75', 86'; Didì 50', 60'; Zizinho 85' |

Estadio Nacional, Lima
Attendance: 45,000
Referee: Bertley Cross (United Kingdom)

27 March 1957

| Peru | 4–1 | Colombia |
|---|---|---|
| Terry 34'; Rivera 35', 37'; Bassa 83' | | Arango 57' (pen.) |

Estadio Nacional, Lima
Attendance: 55,000
Referee: Ronald Lynch (United Kingdom)

28 March 1957

| Argentina | 6–2 | Chile |
|---|---|---|
| Sívori 7'; Angelillo 21', 70'; Maschio 53', 74'; Corbatta 83' (pen.) | | Fernández 14', 28' |

Estadio Nacional, Lima
Attendance: 50,000
Referee: Robert Turner (United Kingdom)

28 March 1957

| Uruguay | 3–2 | Brazil |
|---|---|---|
| Campero 15', 23'; Ambrois 17' | | Evaristo 68'; Didì 70' |

Estadio Nacional, Lima
Attendance: 50,000
Referee: Erwin Hieger (Austria)

31 March 1957

| Brazil | 1–0 | Peru |
|---|---|---|
| Didì 73' (pen.) |

Estadio Nacional, Lima
Attendance: 55,000
Referee: Ronald Lynch (United Kingdom)

1 April 1957

| Colombia | 4–1 | Ecuador |
|---|---|---|
| Álvarez 19' (pen.); Gutiérrez 22'; Gamboa 30', 58' | | Larraz 32' (pen.) |

Estadio Nacional, Lima
Attendance: 40,000
Referee: Harry Davis (United Kingdom)

1 April 1957

| Uruguay | 2–0 | Chile |
|---|---|---|
| Campero 28'; Roque 40' |

Estadio Nacional, Lima
Attendance: 40,000
Referee: Erwin Hieger (Austria)
Match suspended at the 43rd minute due to pitch invasion.

3 April 1957

| Argentina | 3–0 | Brazil |
|---|---|---|
| Angelillo 23'; Maschio 87'; Cruz 90' |

Estadio Nacional, Lima
Attendance: 55,000
Referee: Robert Turner (United Kingdom)

6 April 1957

| Peru | 2–1 | Argentina |
|---|---|---|
| Mosquera 15'; Terry 81' | | Sívori 50' |

Estadio Nacional, Lima
Attendance: 60,000
Referee: Bertley Cross (United Kingdom)

== Result ==
1957 South American Championship champions

Argentina
11th title

== Goalscorers ==
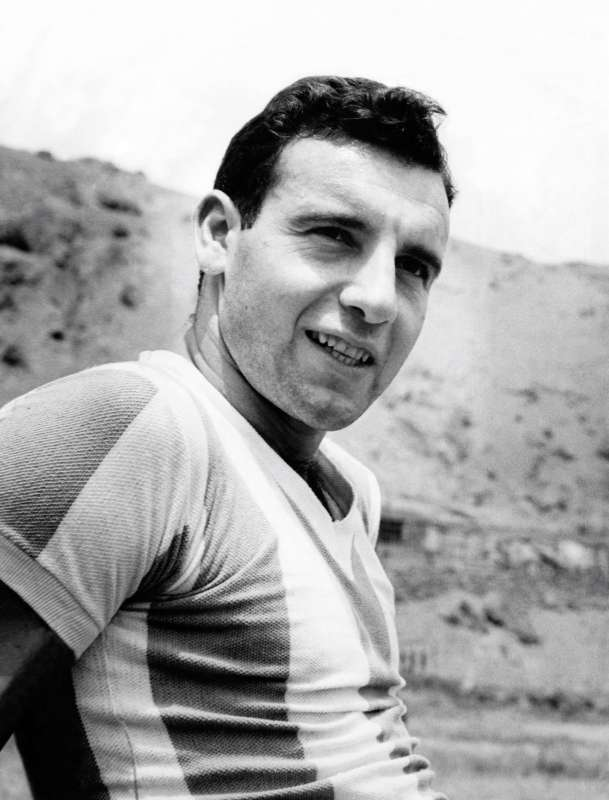
Humberto Maschio, one of the two top scorers

A total of 33 different players scored 101 goals in the tournament. None were credited as own goals.

9 Goals

- (Argentina) Humberto Maschio
- (Uruguay) Javier Ambrois

8 Goals

- (Argentina) Antonio Angelillo
- (Brazil) Didi
- (Brazil) Evaristo

5 Goals

- (Peru) Alberto Terry

4 Goals

- (Ecuador) Jorge Larraz

3 Goals

- (Argentina) Omar Sívori
- (Brazil) Pepe
- (Chile) José Fernández
- (Chile) Jaime Ramírez Banda
- (Colombia) Carlos Arango
- (Colombia) Delio Gamboa
- (Ecuador) Enrique Cantos
- (Peru) Máximo Mosquera
- (Uruguay) Luis Campero

2 Goals

- (Argentina) Oreste Corbatta
- (Argentina) Osvaldo Cruz
- (Brazil) Joel
- (Brazil) Zizinho
- (Chile) Carlos Verdejo
- (Peru) Manuel Rivera

1 Goal

- (Argentina) José Sanfilippo
- (Chile) Sergio Espinosa
- (Colombia) Alejandro Carrillo
- (Colombia) Humberto Álvarez
- (Colombia) Jaime Gutiérrez
- (Colombia) Alberto Valencia
- (Peru) Juan Bassa
- (Peru) Juan Seminario
- (Uruguay) Carlos María Carranza
- (Uruguay) José Walter Roque
- (Uruguay) José Sasía
