= 1956 South American Championship squads =

List of footballers

These are the squads for the countries that played in the 1956 South American Championship. The participating countries were Argentina, Brazil, Chile, Paraguay, Peru and Uruguay.

== Argentina ==
Head Coach: (Argentina) Guillermo Stábile

No.	Pos.	Player	Date of birth (age)	Caps	Goals	Club
	FW	Ricardo Bonelli	28 October 1932 (aged 23)	5	1	(Argentine Football Association) Independiente
	MF	Carlos Cecconato	27 January 1930 (aged 25)	9	1	(Argentine Football Association) Independiente
	DF	Juan Carlos Colman	15 December 1922 (aged 33)	9	0	(Argentine Football Association) Boca Juniors
	FW	Ernesto Cucchiaroni	16 November 1927 (aged 28)	2	0	(Argentine Football Association) Boca Juniors
	DF	Pedro Dellacha	9 July 1926 (aged 29)	9	0	(Argentine Football Association) Racing Club
	DF	José García Pérez	3 December 1921 (aged 34)	6	0	(Argentine Football Association) Racing Club
	FW	Ernesto Grillo	1 October 1929 (aged 26)	10	6	(Argentine Football Association) Independiente
	MF	Ernesto Gutiérrez	9 November 1927 (aged 28)	15	0	(Argentine Football Association) Racing Club
	FW	Ángel Labruna	28 September 1918 (aged 37)	22	14	(Argentine Football Association) River Plate
	FW	Francisco Lojacono	11 December 1935 (aged 20)	0	0	(Argentine Football Association) Gimnasia y Esgrima (LP)
	MF	Juan Francisco Lombardo	11 June 1925 (aged 30)	12	0	(Argentine Football Association) Boca Juniors
	FW	Rodolfo Micheli	24 April 1930 (aged 25)	9	10	(Argentine Football Association) Independiente
	MF	Eliseo Mouriño	3 June 1927 (aged 28)	10	0	(Argentine Football Association) Boca Juniors
	GK	Julio Musimessi	9 July 1924 (aged 31)	10	0	(Argentine Football Association) Boca Juniors
	MF	Luis Pentrelli	15 June 1932 (aged 23)	0	0	(Argentine Football Association) Gimnasia y Esgrima (LP)
	FW	Omar Sívori	2 October 1935 (aged 20)	0	0	(Argentine Football Association) River Plate
	DF	Federico Vairo	27 January 1930 (aged 25)	4	0	(Argentine Football Association) River Plate
	MF	José Varacka	27 May 1932 (aged 23)	0	0	(Argentine Football Association) Independiente
	FW	Roberto Zárate	15 December 1932 (aged 23)	0	0	(Argentine Football Association) River Plate

== Brazil ==
Head Coach: (Brazil) Osvaldo Brandão

No.	Pos.	Player	Date of birth (age)	Caps	Goals	Club
	DF	Alfredo Ramos	27 October 1924 (aged 31)	0	0	(Brazilian Football Confederation) São Paulo
	FW	Álvaro	24 September 1931 (aged 24)	1	1	(Brazilian Football Confederation) Santos
	FW	Baltazar	14 January 1926 (aged 30)	24	15	(Brazilian Football Confederation) Corinthians
	FW	Canhoteiro	24 September 1932 (aged 23)	1	1	(Brazilian Football Confederation) São Paulo
	GK	Cabeção	23 August 1930 (aged 25)	0	0	(Brazilian Football Confederation) Portuguesa
	DF	Nílton de Sordi	14 February 1931 (aged 24)	1	0	(Brazilian Football Confederation) São Paulo
	FW	Emanuele Del Vecchio	24 September 1934 (aged 21)	0	0	(Brazilian Football Confederation) Santos
	DF	Djalma Santos	23 February 1929 (aged 26)	19	1	(Brazilian Football Confederation) Portuguesa
	MF	Formiga	11 November 1930 (aged 25)	2	0	(Brazilian Football Confederation) Santos
	GK	Gilmar	22 August 1930 (aged 25)	3	0	(Brazilian Football Confederation) Corinthians
	FW	Jair	21 March 1921 (aged 34)	37	22	(Brazilian Football Confederation) Palmeiras
	MF	Julião	11 April 1929 (aged 26)	0	0	(Brazilian Football Confederation) Corinthians
	FW	Luizinho	7 March 1930 (aged 25)	2	0	(Brazilian Football Confederation) Corinthians
	FW	Maurinho	6 June 1933 (aged 22)	4	3	(Brazilian Football Confederation) São Paulo
	DF	Mauro Ramos	30 August 1930 (aged 25)	7	0	(Brazilian Football Confederation) São Paulo
	FW	Nestor	23 June 1926 (aged 29)	0	0	(Brazilian Football Confederation) XV de Jaú
	DF	Olavo	9 November 1927 (aged 28)	1	0	(Brazilian Football Confederation) Corinthians
	GK	Paulo Martorano	3 May 1933 (aged 22)	0	0	(Brazilian Football Confederation) Guarani
	MF	Roberto Belangero	28 June 1928 (aged 27)	1	0	(Brazilian Football Confederation) Corinthians
	FW	Tite	4 June 1930 (aged 25)	0	0	(Brazilian Football Confederation) Santos
	FW	Zezinho	2 June 1930 (aged 25)	0	0	(Brazilian Football Confederation) São Paulo
	MF	Zito	8 August 1932 (aged 23)	1	0	(Brazilian Football Confederation) Santos

== Chile ==
Head Coach: (Chile) Luis Tirado

No.	Pos.	Player	Date of birth (age)	Caps	Goals	Club
	DF	Rodolfo Almeyda	5 July 1923 (aged 32)	11	0	(Football Federation of Chile) Palestino
	DF	Manuel Álvarez	23 May 1928 (aged 27)	32	0	(Football Federation of Chile) Universidad Católica
	DF	Isaac Carrasco	12 August 1928 (aged 27)	13	0	(Football Federation of Chile) Colo Colo
	MF	Ramiro Cortés	27 April 1931 (aged 24)	27	0	(Football Federation of Chile) Audax Italiano
	DF	Carlos Cubillos	25 December 1929 (aged 26)	3	0	(Football Federation of Chile) Unión Española
	GK	Misael Escuti	20 December 1928 (aged 27)	8	0	(Football Federation of Chile) Colo Colo
	GK	Carlos Espinoza	21 April 1928 (aged 27)	0	0	(Football Federation of Chile) Everton
	FW	Sergio Espinoza	25 December 1928 (aged 27)	3	0	(Football Federation of Chile) Audax Italiano
	FW	José Fernández	23 February 1928 (aged 27)	6	0	(Football Federation of Chile) Palestino
	DF	Sergio Goity	21 February 1930 (aged 25)	0	0	(Football Federation of Chile) Palestino
	MF	Enrique Hormazábal	6 January 1931 (aged 25)	30	10	(Football Federation of Chile) Colo Colo
	FW	René Meléndez	29 December 1928 (aged 27)	23	9	(Football Federation of Chile) Everton
	FW	Manuel Muñoz	28 April 1928 (aged 27)	18	7	(Football Federation of Chile) Colo Colo
	GK	Francisco Nitsche	4 November 1930 (aged 25)	0	0	(Football Federation of Chile) Unión Española
	FW	Jaime Ramírez	14 August 1931 (aged 24)	8	2	(Football Federation of Chile) Colo Colo
	FW	Leonel Sánchez	25 April 1936 (aged 19)	2	0	(Football Federation of Chile) Universidad de Chile

== Paraguay ==
Head Coach: (Paraguay) Julio Ramírez

No.	Pos.	Player	Date of birth (age)	Caps	Goals	Club
—	DF	Edelmiro Arévalo	7 January 1929 (aged 27)	0	0	(Paraguayan Football Association) Olimpia
—	GK	Manuel Benítez		0	0	(Paraguayan Football Association) Olimpia
—	DF	Higinio Benítez Casco		0	0	(Paraguayan Football Association) Libertad
—	GK	Asunción Caballero	5 May 1932 (aged 23)	0	0	(Paraguayan Football Association) Presidente Hayes
—	MF	Joel Cabrera	20 April 1933 (aged 22)	0	0	(Paraguayan Football Association) Cerro Porteño
—	FW	Juan Cañete	27 July 1929 (aged 26)	5	0	(Paraguayan Football Association) Presidente Hayes
—	MF	Eligio Echagüe	31 December 1931 (aged 24)	3	0	(Paraguayan Football Association) Olimpia
—	FW	Antonio Ramón Gómez	4 May 1928 (aged 27)	7	0	(Paraguayan Football Association) Libertad
—	FW	Hermes González	6 April 1935 (aged 20)	4	0	(Paraguayan Football Association) Libertad
—	MF	Ireneo Hermosilla	31 January 1928 (aged 29)	7	0	(Paraguayan Football Association) Libertad
—	FW	Enrique Jara Saguier	12 July 1934 (aged 21)	0	0	(Paraguayan Football Association) Cerro Porteño
—	FW	Manuel Lugo		0	0	(Paraguayan Football Association) Sportivo Luqueño
—	MF	Victoriano Leguizamón	23 March 1922 (aged 33)	9	0	(Paraguayan Football Association) Olimpia
—	DF	Robustiano Maciel	24 May 1930 (aged 25)	12	0	(Paraguayan Football Association) Sol de América
—	FW	Hilarión Osorio	21 October 1928 (aged 27)	0	0	(Paraguayan Football Association) Sportivo Luqueño
—	DF	Albino Ricardo		0	0	(Paraguayan Football Association) Cerro Porteño
—	FW	Máximo Rolón	18 November 1934 (aged 21)	5	5	(Paraguayan Football Association) Libertad
—	FW	Juan Ángel Romero	27 December 1934 (aged 21)	12	1	(Uruguayan Football Association) Nacional
—	FW	Ruperto Torres		0	0	(Paraguayan Football Association) Olimpia
—	MF	Alfredo Vega	2 February 1935 (aged 20)	0	0	(Paraguayan Football Association) Libertad
—	MF	Salvador Villalba	29 August 1924 (aged 31)	5	1	(Paraguayan Football Association) Libertad

== Peru ==
Head Coach: (Peru) Arturo Fernández

No.	Pos.	Player	Date of birth (age)	Caps	Goals	Club
	DF	Isaac Andrade	13 July 1937 (aged 18)	0	0	(Peruvian Football Federation) Sport Boys
	FW	Guillermo Barbadillo	9 January 1925 (aged 31)	17	4	(Peruvian Football Federation) Alianza Lima
	MF	Luis Calderón	17 June 1929 (aged 26)	12	0	(Peruvian Football Federation) Sport Boys
	FW	Félix Castillo	21 February 1928 (aged 27)	12	5	(Peruvian Football Federation) Alianza Lima
	FW	Roberto Castillo	29 April 1930 (aged 25)	12	1	(Peruvian Football Federation) Alianza Lima
	MF	Germán Colunga	28 May 1922 (aged 33)	9	0	(Peruvian Football Federation) Atlético Chalaco
	DF	Guillermo Delgado	11 February 1931 (aged 24)	16	0	(Peruvian Football Federation) Alianza Lima
	MF	Roberto Drago	28 July 1923 (aged 32)	18	4	(Peruvian Football Federation) Deportivo Municipal
	FW	Óscar Gómez Sánchez	31 October 1935 (aged 20)	9	9	(Peruvian Football Federation) Alianza Lima
	DF	René Gutiérrez		0	0	(Peruvian Football Federation) Universitario de Deportes
	MF	Cornelio Heredia	16 October 1920 (aged 35)	26	2	(Peruvian Football Federation) Alianza Lima
	MF	Carlos Lazón	5 October 1929 (aged 26)	5	0	(Peruvian Football Federation) Alianza Lima
	MF	Alberto Loret de Mola	13 January 1928 (aged 28)	4	0	(Peruvian Football Federation) Universitario de Deportes
	FW	Máximo Mosquera	8 January 1928 (aged 28)	13	2	(Peruvian Football Federation) Alianza Lima
	DF	Víctor Salas	29 March 1935 (aged 20)	4	0	(Peruvian Football Federation) Universitario de Deportes
	FW	Juan Seminario	22 July 1936 (aged 19)	0	0	(Peruvian Football Federation) Deportivo Municipal
	MF	Alberto Terry	16 May 1929 (aged 26)	10	6	(Peruvian Football Federation) Universitario de Deportes
	FW	Jacinto Villalba	8 February 1924 (aged 31)	0	0	(Peruvian Football Federation) Universitario de Deportes
	GK	Dimas Zegarra	19 December 1932 (aged 23)	0	0	(Peruvian Football Federation) Universitario de Deportes

== Uruguay ==
Head Coach: (Uruguay) Hugo Bagnulo

No.	Pos.	Player	Date of birth (age)	Caps	Goals	Club
	MF	Javier Ambrois	9 May 1932 (aged 23)	7	1	(Uruguayan Football Association) Nacional
	MF	Alfonso Auscarriaga	7 September 1927 (aged 28)	0	0	(Uruguayan Football Association) Danubio
	FW	Carlos Borges	14 January 1932 (aged 24)	10	5	(Uruguayan Football Association) Peñarol
	DF	Ladislao Brazionis	23 June 1929 (aged 26)	0	0	(Uruguayan Football Association) Rampla Juniors
	FW	Carlos Carranza	30 November 1928 (aged 27)	6	0	(Uruguayan Football Association) Cerro
	DF	Carlos Correa	30 April 1936 (aged 19)	0	0	(Uruguayan Football Association) Danubio
	MF	Carlos Chávez		0	0	(Uruguayan Football Association) Liverpool
	MF	Héctor Demarco	12 February 1936 (aged 19)	3	0	(Uruguayan Football Association) Defensor Sporting
	FW	Guillermo Escalada	24 April 1936 (aged 19)	1	0	(Uruguayan Football Association) Nacional
	MF	Roque Fernández	1927 (28-29)	0	0	(Uruguayan Football Association) Rampla Juniors
	MF	Roberto Leopardi	19 July 1933 (aged 22)	2	0	(Uruguayan Football Association) Nacional
	GK	Julio Maceiras	22 April 1926 (aged 29)	0	0	(Uruguayan Football Association) Danubio
	FW	Washington Manghini		0	0	(Uruguayan Football Association) Danubio
	DF	William Martínez	13 January 1928 (aged 28)	13	0	(Uruguayan Football Association) Peñarol
	FW	Daniel Melgarejo		0	0	(Uruguayan Football Association) Danubio
	FW	Óscar Miguez	5 December 1927 (aged 28)	12	11	(Uruguayan Football Association) Peñarol
	MF	Luis Alberto Miramontes	15 December 1928 (aged 27)	0	0	(Uruguayan Football Association) Defensor Sporting
	FW	Luis Pírez		0	0	(Uruguayan Football Association) Racing de Montevideo
	MF	Víctor Rodríguez Andrade	4 February 1927 (aged 28)	11	0	(Uruguayan Football Association) Peñarol
	FW	Walter Roque	8 May 1937 (aged 18)	0	0	(Uruguayan Football Association) Rampla Juniors
