= 1955 South American Championship squads =

List of footballers

The following squads were named for the 1955 South American Championship that took place in Chile.

== Argentina ==
Head coach: Guillermo Stábile

No.	Pos.	Player	Date of birth (age)	Caps	Goals	Club
	DF	Luis Bagnato	10 May 1924 (aged 30)	0	0	(Argentine Football Association) Banfield
	DF	Arnaldo Balay	2 September 1928 (aged 26)	0	0	(Argentine Football Association) Racing Club
	FW	Ricardo Bonelli	28 October 1932 (aged 22)	2	0	(Argentine Football Association) Independiente
	FW	José Borello	24 November 1929 (aged 25)	2	0	(Argentine Football Association) Boca Juniors
	FW	Carlos Cecconato	27 January 1930 (aged 25)	4	0	(Argentine Football Association) Independiente
	DF	Juan Carlos Colmán	15 December 1922 (aged 32)	7	0	(Argentine Football Association) Boca Juniors
	MF	Norberto Conde	14 March 1931 (aged 23)	0	0	(Argentine Football Association) Vélez Sársfield
	FW	Osvaldo Cruz	29 May 1931 (aged 23)	5	1	(Argentine Football Association) Independiente
	FW	Ernesto Cucchiaroni	16 November 1927 (aged 27)	0	0	(Argentine Football Association) Boca Juniors
	DF	Pedro Dellacha	9 July 1926 (aged 28)	5	0	(Argentine Football Association) Racing Club
	FW	Ernesto Grillo	1 October 1929 (aged 25)	7	4	(Argentine Football Association) Independiente
	DF	Ernesto Gutiérrez	5 November 1927 (aged 27)	10	0	(Argentine Football Association) Racing Club
	MF	Ángel Labruna	28 September 1918 (aged 36)	17	11	(Argentine Football Association) River Plate
	DF	Guillermo Leguía		0	0	(Argentine Football Association) San Lorenzo
	DF	Francisco Lombardo	11 June 1925 (aged 29)	7	0	(Argentine Football Association) Boca Juniors
	GK	Roqué Marrapodi	18 June 1919 (aged 35)	2	0	(Argentine Football Association) Ferro Carril Oeste
	FW	Rodolfo Micheli	24 April 1930 (aged 24)	4	2	(Argentine Football Association) Independiente
	MF	Eliseo Mouriño	3 June 1927 (aged 27)	7	0	(Argentine Football Association) Boca Juniors
	GK	Julio Musimessi	9 July 1924 (aged 30)	5	0	(Argentine Football Association) Boca Juniors
	MF	Pascasio Sola	8 November 1928 (aged 26)	0	0	(Argentine Football Association) River Plate
	DF	Federico Vairo	27 January 1930 (aged 25)	0	0	(Argentine Football Association) River Plate
	FW	Santiago Vernazza	23 September 1928 (aged 26)	4	1	(Argentine Football Association) River Plate

== Chile ==
Head coach: Luis Tirado

No.	Pos.	Player	Date of birth (age)	Caps	Goals	Club
	DF	Rodolfo Almeyda	10 June 1923 (aged 31)	4	0	(Football Federation of Chile) Palestino
	DF	Manuel Álvarez	23 May 1928 (aged 26)	25	0	(Football Federation of Chile) Universidad Católica
	DF	Isaac Carrasco	14 August 1928 (aged 26)	6	0	(Football Federation of Chile) Colo-Colo
	MF	Ramiro Cortés	27 April 1931 (aged 23)	20	0	(Football Federation of Chile) Audax Italiano
	FW	Guillermo Díaz Carmona	25 June 1926 (aged 28)	12	2	(Football Federation of Chile) Santiago Morning
	FW	Guillermo Díaz Zambrano	29 December 1930 (aged 24)	6	1	(Football Federation of Chile) Palestino
	GK	Misael Escuti	20 December 1926 (aged 28)	1	0	(Football Federation of Chile) Colo-Colo
	GK	Carlos Espinoza	21 April 1928 (aged 26)	0	0	(Football Federation of Chile) Everton
	FW	Sergio Espinoza	25 December 1928 (aged 26)	1	0	(Football Federation of Chile) Audax Italiano
	MF	Enrique Hormazábal	6 January 1931 (aged 24)	23	3	(Football Federation of Chile) Santiago Morning
	FW	René Meléndez	29 December 1928 (aged 26)	16	6	(Football Federation of Chile) Everton
	FW	Manuel Muñoz	28 April 1928 (aged 26)	14	3	(Football Federation of Chile) Colo-Colo
	FW	Jaime Ramírez	14 August 1931 (aged 23)	2	0	(Football Federation of Chile) Colo-Colo
	DF	Eduardo Robledo	26 July 1928 (aged 26)	4	0	(Football Federation of Chile) Colo-Colo
	FW	Jorge Robledo	14 April 1926 (aged 28)	10	3	(Football Federation of Chile) Colo-Colo
	MF	Hernán Rodríguez	2 May 1933 (aged 21)	0	0	(Football Federation of Chile) Colo-Colo
	DF	Antonio Valjalo	6 May 1926 (aged 28)	1	0	(Football Federation of Chile) Colo-Colo
	MF	Luis Vera	29 December 1929 (aged 25)	2	0	(Football Federation of Chile) Audax Italiano

== Ecuador ==
Head coach: José María Jiménez

No.	Pos.	Player	Date of birth (age)	Caps	Goals	Club
	MF	Carlos Alume	2 January 1923 (aged 32)	0	0	(Ecuadorian Football Federation)
	MF	Marcial Astudillo		0	0	(Ecuadorian Football Federation)
	FW	José Vicente Balseca	19 August 1933 (aged 21)	5	0	(Ecuadorian Football Federation) Emelec
	GK	Alfredo Bonnard	3 November 1930 (aged 24)	6	0	(Ecuadorian Football Federation) Valdez
	FW	Enrique Cantos	25 February 1925 (aged 30)	9	1	(Ecuadorian Football Federation) Barcelona SC
	FW	Clímaco Cañarte	5 February 1936 (aged 19)	0	0	(Ecuadorian Football Federation) Barcelona SC
	MF	Luis Drouet		0	0	(Ecuadorian Football Federation)
	MF	Gerónimo Gando		0	0	(Ecuadorian Football Federation)
	DF	Rómulo Gómez	6 June 1934 (aged 20)	0	0	(Ecuadorian Football Federation) Emelec
	DF	Honorato Gonzabay	2 January 1929 (aged 26)	0	0	(Ecuadorian Football Federation) Valdez
	DF	Jorge Izaguirre	23 January 1928 (aged 27)	5	0	(Ecuadorian Football Federation) Nueve de Octubre
	FW	Isidro Matute	10 May 1930 (aged 24)	0	0	(Ecuadorian Football Federation) Barcelona SC
	GK	Hugo Mejia	25 November 1931 (aged 23)	0	0	(Ecuadorian Football Federation) Emelec
	FW	Colón Merizalde	10 May 1931 (aged 23)	0	0	(Ecuadorian Football Federation)
	MF	Daniel Pinto	15 July 1929 (aged 25)	6	0	(Ecuadorian Football Federation) Norte América
	FW	Mario Saeteros		0	0	(Ecuadorian Football Federation) Patria
	MF	Carlos Sánchez	15 July 1922 (aged 32)	15	0	(Ecuadorian Football Federation) Barcelona SC
	MF	Galo Solís	5 June 1928 (aged 26)	4	0	(Ecuadorian Football Federation) Emelec
	FW	Elías Gereneldo Triviño	20 July 1931 (aged 23)	0	0	(Ecuadorian Football Federation)
	DF	Ricardo Valencia	16 February 1927 (aged 28)	0	0	(Ecuadorian Football Federation)
	MF	Washington Villacreses	17 February 1931 (aged 24)	0	0	(Ecuadorian Football Federation)
	MF	Orlando Zambrano		2	0	(Ecuadorian Football Federation)

== Paraguay ==
Head coach: César López Fretes

No.	Pos.	Player	Date of birth (age)	Caps	Goals	Club
	FW	Juan Bautista Agüero	24 June 1935 (aged 19)	0	0	(Paraguayan Football Association) Olimpia
	MF	Alejandro Arce		1	0	(Paraguayan Football Association) Cerro Porteño
	FW	Rogelio Bedoya		0	0	(Paraguayan Football Association) Libertad
	FW	Juan Cañete	27 July 1929 (aged 25)	0	0	(Paraguayan Football Association) Presidente Hayes
	GK	Honorio Casco		0	0	(Paraguayan Football Association)
	DF	Eligio Echagüe	31 December 1938 (aged 16)	0	0	(Paraguayan Football Association) Olimpia
	MF	Celso González		0	0	(Paraguayan Football Association)
	MF	Hermes González	6 April 1935 (aged 19)	0	0	(Paraguayan Football Association) Libertad
	DF	Joel Jovellanos	24 September 1932 (aged 22)	0	0	(Paraguayan Football Association) Nacional
	DF	Robustiano Maciel	24 May 1930 (aged 24)	7	0	(Paraguayan Football Association) Libertad
	MF	Eulogio Martínez	11 June 1935 (aged 19)	2	1	(Paraguayan Football Association) Libertad
	DF	Melanio Olmedo	19 January 1932 (aged 23)	4	0	(Paraguayan Football Association) Sol de América
	FW	José Parodi	30 August 1932 (aged 22)	4	2	(Paraguayan Football Association) Sportivo Luqueño
	DF	Ivón Poisson		0	0	(Paraguayan Football Association) Olimpia
	FW	Oppe Quiñónez	25 March 1933 (aged 21)	0	0	(Paraguayan Football Association) Nacional
	FW	Máximo Rolón	18 November 1934 (aged 20)	0	0	(Paraguayan Football Association) Libertad
	FW	Juan Ángel Romero	27 December 1934 (aged 20)	11	1	(Uruguayan Football Association) Nacional
	MF	Darío Segovia	18 March 1932 (aged 22)	0	0	(Paraguayan Football Association) Sol de América
	GK	Marcelino Vargas	1 February 1921 (aged 34)	3	0	(Paraguayan Football Association) Libertad
	MF	Salvador Villalba	29 August 1924 (aged 30)	0	0	(Paraguayan Football Association) Libertad

== Peru ==
Head coach: Juan Valdivieso

No.	Pos.	Player	Date of birth (age)	Caps	Goals	Club
	FW	Guillermo Barbadillo	9 January 1925 (aged 30)	13	3	(Peruvian Football Federation) Alianza Lima
	DF	Andrés Bedoya	10 November 1928 (aged 26)	0	0	(Peruvian Football Federation) Atlético Chalaco
	FW	Félix Castillo	21 February 1928 (aged 27)	12	5	(Peruvian Football Federation) Alianza Lima
	FW	Roberto Castillo	29 April 1930 (aged 24)	8	0	(Peruvian Football Federation) Alianza Lima
	MF	Germán Colunga	28 May 1922 (aged 32)	5	0	(Peruvian Football Federation) Universitario de Deportes
	DF	Guillermo Delgado	11 February 1931 (aged 24)	11	0	(Peruvian Football Federation) Alianza Lima
	MF	Roberto Drago	28 July 1923 (aged 31)	16	4	(Peruvian Football Federation) Deportivo Municipal
	FW	Alberto Garrido		0	0	(Peruvian Football Federation)
	FW	Óscar Gómez Sánchez	31 October 1935 (aged 19)	4	3	(Peruvian Football Federation) Alianza Lima
	MF	Cornelio Heredia	16 October 1920 (aged 34)	21	1	(Peruvian Football Federation) Alianza Lima
	MF	Dagoberto Lavalle	25 March 1925 (aged 29)	4	0	(Peruvian Football Federation) Deportivo Municipal
	MF	Carlos Lazón	5 October 1929 (aged 25)	2	0	(Peruvian Football Federation) Alianza Lima
	MF	Alberto Loret de Mola	13 January 1928 (aged 27)	0	0	(Peruvian Football Federation) Universitario de Deportes
	FW	Máximo Mosquera	8 January 1928 (aged 27)	9	2	(Peruvian Football Federation) Alianza Lima
	FW	Luis Navarrete	22 January 1928 (aged 27)	5	1	(Peruvian Football Federation) Deportivo Municipal
	DF	Agapito Perales	14 March 1919 (aged 35)	0	0	(Peruvian Football Federation) Sporting Tabaco
	GK	Luis Suárez	17 May 1926 (aged 28)	7	0	(Peruvian Football Federation) Mariscal Sucre
	DF	Víctor Salas	29 March 1935 (aged 19)	0	0	(Peruvian Football Federation) Universitario de Deportes
	FW	Alberto Terry	16 May 1929 (aged 25)	7	5	(Peruvian Football Federation) Universitario de Deportes

== Uruguay ==
Head coach: Juan Carlos Corazzo

No.	Pos.	Player	Date of birth (age)	Caps	Goals	Club
	FW	Julio Abbadie	7 September 1930 (aged 24)	13	8	(Uruguayan Football Association) Peñarol
	FW	Omar Abreo		0	0	(Uruguayan Football Association) Liverpool
	FW	Carlos Borges	14 January 1932 (aged 23)	5	4	(Uruguayan Football Association) Peñarol
	MF	Néstor Carballo	3 February 1929 (aged 26)	7	0	(Uruguayan Football Association) Nacional
	FW	Carlos Carranza	30 November 1928 (aged 26)	1	0	(Uruguayan Football Association) Cerro
	FW	Alberto Chagas		0	0	(Uruguayan Football Association) Nacional
	MF	Luis Cruz	28 April 1925 (aged 29)	9	0	(Uruguayan Football Association) Nacional
	MF	Héctor Demarco	31 May 1936 (aged 18)	0	0	(Uruguayan Football Association) Defensor Sporting
	FW	Guillermo Escalada	24 April 1936 (aged 18)	0	0	(Uruguayan Football Association) Nacional
	FW	Américo Galván		0	0	(Uruguayan Football Association) Peñarol
	DF	Matías González	6 August 1925 (aged 29)	20	0	(Uruguayan Football Association) Cerro
	DF	Waldemar González	28 March 1927 (aged 27)	0	0	(Uruguayan Football Association) Nacional
	MF	Roberto Leopardi	19 July 1933 (aged 21)	0	0	(Uruguayan Football Association) Nacional
	DF	William Martínez	13 January 1928 (aged 27)	10	0	(Uruguayan Football Association) Peñarol
	GK	Roque Máspoli	12 October 1917 (aged 37)	23	0	(Uruguayan Football Association) Peñarol
	FW	Oscar Míguez	5 December 1927 (aged 27)	7	8	(Uruguayan Football Association) Peñarol
	FW	Walter Morel	30 June 1927 (aged 27)	6	2	(Uruguayan Football Association) River Plate
	FW	Julio Pérez	19 June 1926 (aged 28)	4	1	(Uruguayan Football Association) Nacional
	MF	Caledonio Rey		0	0	(Uruguayan Football Association) River Plate
	MF	Víctor Rodríguez Andrade	2 May 1927 (aged 27)	7	0	(Uruguayan Football Association) Peñarol
	GK	Walter Taibo	7 March 1931 (aged 23)	0	0	(Uruguayan Football Association) Nacional
	DF	Omar Tejera		0	0	(Uruguayan Football Association) Montevideo Wanderers
