= Argentina national football team results (1940–1959) =

National football team results (1940–1959)

This page details the match results and statistics of the Argentina national football team from 1940 to 1959.

== Key ==
Key to matches

- Att.=Match attendance
- (H)=Home ground
- (A)=Away ground
- (N)=Neutral ground

Key to record by opponent

- Pld=Games played
- W=Games won
- D=Games drawn
- L=Games lost
- GF=Goals for
- GA=Goals against

== Results ==
Argentina's score is shown first in each case.

No.	Date	Venue	Opponents	Score	Competition	Argentina scorers	Att.	Ref.
193	18 February 1940	Parque Antártica, São Paulo (A)	Brazil	2–2 (a.e.t.)	Copa Julio Argentino Roca	Baldonedo, F. Cassan	—	
194	18 February 1940	Estadio de Independiente, Avellaneda (H)	Paraguay	3–1	Copa Rosa Chevallier Boutell	Ballesteros, Pedernera, Leguizamón	—	
195	25 February 1940	Parque Antártica, São Paulo (A)	Brazil	3–0	Copa Julio Argentino Roca	Sastre, Baldonedo, Fidel	—	
196	25 February 1940	San Martín (H)	Paraguay	4–0	Copa Rosa Chevallier Boutell	Laferrara (2), Masantonio (2)	—	
197	2 March 1940	Estadio de Chacarita Juniors, Buenos Aires (H)	Chile	4–1	Copa Presidente de Chile	Laferrara (3), Maril	—	
198	5 March 1940	Estadio Gasómetro, Buenos Aires (H)	Brazil	6–1	Copa Julio Argentino Roca	Masantonio (2), Peucelle (3), Baldonedo	—	
199	9 March 1940	Estadio Gasómetro, Buenos Aires (H)	Chile	3–2	Copa Presidente de Chile	Arrieta (3)	—	
200	10 March 1940	Estadio Gasómetro, Buenos Aires (H)	Brazil	2–3	Copa Julio Argentino Roca	Baldonedo (2)	—	
201	17 March 1940	Estadio de Independiente, Avellaneda (H)	Brazil	5–1	Copa Julio Argentino Roca	F. Cassan, Masantonio, Peucelle, Baldonedo (2)	—	
202	18 July 1940	Estadio Centenario, Montevideo (A)	Uruguay	0–3	Copa Héctor Gómez		—	
203	15 August 1940	Estadio Monumental, Buenos Aires (H)	Uruguay	5–0	Copa Juan Mignaburu	Sarlanga, Esperón, Moreno, Marvezzi (2)	—	
204	5 January 1941	Estadio Nacional, Santiago (A)	Chile	2–1	Copa Presidente de Argentina	Sastre, Arregui	—	
205	9 January 1941	Estadio Nacional, Santiago (A)	Chile	5–2	Copa Presidente de Argentina	Sastre (2), Arrieta (2), Arregui	—	
206	19 January 1941	Lima (A)	Peru	1–1	Copa Roque Sáenz Peña	Belen	—	
207	26 January 1941	Lima (A)	Peru	1–1	Copa Roque Sáenz Peña	Belen	—	
208	29 January 1941	Lima (A)	Peru	3–0	Copa Roque Sáenz Peña	Moreno, Sastre, Marvezzi	—	
209	12 February 1941	Estadio Nacional, Santiago (N)	Peru	2–1	1941 South American Championship	Moreno (2)	45,000	
210	16 February 1941	Estadio Nacional, Santiago (N)	Ecuador	6–1	1941 South American Championship	Marvezzi (5), Moreno	70,000	
211	23 February 1941	Estadio Nacional, Santiago (N)	Uruguay	1–0	1941 South American Championship	Sastre	48,000	
212	4 March 1941	Estadio Nacional, Santiago (N)	Chile	1–0	1941 South American Championship	E. García	70,000	
213	11 January 1942	Estadio Centenario, Montevideo (N)	Paraguay	4–3	1942 South American Championship	Sandoval, Masantonio (2), Perucca	20,000	
214	17 January 1942	Estadio Centenario, Montevideo (N)	Brazil	2–1	1942 South American Championship	E. García, Masantonio	30,000	
215	22 January 1942	Estadio Centenario, Montevideo (N)	Ecuador	12–0	1942 South American Championship	E. García, Moreno (5), Pedernera, Masantonio (4), Perucca	25,000	
216	25 January 1942	Estadio Centenario, Montevideo (N)	Peru	3–1	1942 South American Championship	Heredia, Moreno (2)	12,000	
217	31 January 1942	Estadio Centenario, Montevideo (N)	Chile	0–0	1942 South American Championship		15,000	
218	7 February 1942	Estadio Centenario, Montevideo (N)	Uruguay	0–1	1942 South American Championship		70,000	
219	25 May 1942	Estadio Monumental, Buenos Aires (H)	Uruguay	4–1	Copa Newton	J. Alberti, Martino, Pontoni (2)	—	
220	25 August 1942	Estadio Centenario, Montevideo (A)	Uruguay	1–1	Copa Lipton	Muñoz	—	
221	28 March 1943	Estadio Monumental, Buenos Aires (H)	Uruguay	3–3	Copa Juan Mignaburu	Pontoni (2), Martino	—	
222	4 April 1943	Estadio Centenario, Montevideo (A)	Uruguay	1–0	Copa Héctor Gómez	J. Canteli	—	
223	10 July 1943	Estadio Defensores del Chaco, Asunción (A)	Paraguay	5–2	Copa Rosa Chevallier Boutell	Sarlanga (2), Pelegrina, Martino, De la Mata	—	
224	11 July 1943	Estadio Defensores del Chaco, Asunción (A)	Paraguay	1–2	Copa Rosa Chevallier Boutell	Sarlanga	—	
225	6 January 1945	Estadio Gasómetro, Buenos Aires (H)	Paraguay	5–2	Copa Rosa Chevallier Boutell	Martino, Muñoz, Pontoni (2), Loustau	—	
226	9 January 1945	Estadio Gasómetro, Buenos Aires (H)	Paraguay	5–3	Copa Rosa Chevallier Boutell	Pontoni (4), Martino	—	
227	18 January 1945	Estadio Nacional, Santiago (N)	Bolivia	4–0	1945 South American Championship	Pontoni, Martino, Loustau, De la Mata	35,000	
228	31 January 1945	Estadio Nacional, Santiago (N)	Ecuador	4–2	1945 South American Championship	Pontoni, De la Mata, Martino, Pelegrina	60,000	
229	7 February 1945	Estadio Nacional, Santiago (N)	Colombia	9–1	1945 South American Championship	Pontoni (2), Méndez (2), Martino, Boyé, Loustau, J. L. Ferraro (2)	60,000	
230	11 February 1945	Estadio Nacional, Santiago (N)	Chile	1–1	1945 South American Championship	Méndez	70,000	
231	15 February 1945	Estadio Nacional, Santiago (N)	Brazil	3–1	1945 South American Championship	Méndez (3)	65,000	
232	25 February 1945	Estadio Nacional, Santiago (N)	Uruguay	1–0	1945 South American Championship	Martino	75,000	
233	7 July 1945	Estadio Defensores del Chaco, Asunción (A)	Paraguay	1–5	Copa Rosa Chevallier Boutell	Pontoni	—	
234	9 July 1945	Estadio Defensores del Chaco, Asunción (A)	Paraguay	3–1	Copa Rosa Chevallier Boutell	Martino (2), Sued	—	
235	18 July 1945	Estadio Centenario, Montevideo (A)	Uruguay	2–2	Copa Lipton	Martino, Young (o.g.)	—	
236	15 August 1945	Estadio Gasómetro, Buenos Aires (H)	Uruguay	6–2	Copa Newton	Loustau, J. J. Ferraro, Méndez, Martino (2), Pedernera	—	
237	16 December 1945	Pacaembu Stadium, São Paulo (A)	Brazil	4–3	Copa Julio Argentino Roca	Sued, Pedernera, Boyé, Labruna	—	
238	20 December 1945	Estádio São Januário, Rio de Janeiro (A)	Brazil	2–6	Copa Julio Argentino Roca	Pedernera, Martino	—	
239	23 December 1945	Estádio São Januário, Rio de Janeiro (A)	Brazil	1–3	Copa Julio Argentino Roca	Martino	—	
240	12 January 1946	Estadio Monumental, Buenos Aires (N)	Paraguay	2–0	1946 South American Championship	De la Mata, Martino	70,000	
241	19 January 1946	Estadio Gasómetro, Buenos Aires (N)	Bolivia	7–1	1946 South American Championship	Labruna (2), Méndez (2), Salvini (2), Loustau	65,000	
242	26 January 1946	Estadio Monumental, Buenos Aires (N)	Chile	3–1	1946 South American Championship	Labruna (2), Pedernera	80,000	
243	2 February 1946	Estadio Gasómetro, Buenos Aires (N)	Uruguay	3–1	1946 South American Championship	Pedernera, Labruna, Méndez	80,000	
244	10 February 1946	Estadio Monumental, Buenos Aires (N)	Brazil	2–0	1946 South American Championship	Méndez	80,000	
245	2 December 1947	Estadio George Capwell, Guayaquil (N)	Paraguay	6–0	1947 South American Championship	Moreno, Loustau, Pontoni (3), Méndez	20,000	
246	4 December 1947	Estadio George Capwell, Guayaquil (N)	Bolivia	7–0	1947 South American Championship	Méndez (2), Pontoni, Loustau, Boyé (2), Di Stéfano	30,000	
247	11 December 1947	Estadio George Capwell, Guayaquil (N)	Peru	3–2	1947 South American Championship	Moreno, Di Stefano, Boyé	22,000	
248	16 December 1947	Estadio George Capwell, Guayaquil (N)	Chile	1–1	1947 South American Championship	Di Stefano	30,000	
249	18 December 1947	Estadio George Capwell, Guayaquil (N)	Colombia	6–0	1947 South American Championship	Fernández, Di Stefano (3), Boyé, Loustau	12,000	
250	25 December 1947	Estadio George Capwell, Guayaquil (N)	Ecuador	2–0	1947 South American Championship	Moreno, Méndez	25,000	
251	28 December 1947	Estadio George Capwell, Guayaquil (N)	Uruguay	3–1	1947 South American Championship	Méndez (2), Loustau	25,000	
252	25 March 1950	Estadio Monumental, Buenos Aires (H)	Paraguay	2–2	Copa Rosa Chevallier Boutell	Bravo, Vernazza	—	
253	29 March 1950	Estadio Gasómetro, Buenos Aires (H)	Paraguay	4–0	Copa Rosa Chevallier Boutell	Labruna (2), G. Unate (2)	—	
254	9 May 1951	Wembley Stadium, London (A)	England	1–2	Friendly	Boyé	99,000	
255	13 May 1951	Dalymount Park, Dublin (A)	Ireland	1–0	Friendly	Labruna	40,000	
256	7 December 1952	Nuevo Estadio Chamartín, Madrid (A)	Spain	1–0	Friendly	Infante	100,000	
257	14 December 1952	Estádio Nacional, Lisbon (A)	Portugal	3–1	Friendly	Loustau, Labruna (2)	—	
258	14 May 1953	Estadio Monumental, Buenos Aires (H)	England	3–1	Friendly	Grillo (2), Micheli	120,000	
—	17 May 1953	Estadio Monumental, Buenos Aires (H)	England	A–A	Friendly		80,000	
259	5 July 1953	Estadio Monumental, Buenos Aires (H)	Spain	1–0	Friendly	Grillo	—	
260	28 November 1954	Estádio Nacional, Lisbon (A)	Portugal	3–1	Friendly	Cruz, Micheli, Grillo	—	
261	5 December 1954	Stadio Olimpico, Rome (A)	Italy	0–2	Friendly		80,000	
262	2 March 1955	Estadio Nacional, Santiago (N)	Paraguay	5–3	1955 South American Championship	Micheli (4), Borello	35,000	
263	9 March 1955	Estadio Nacional, Santiago (N)	Ecuador	4–0	1955 South American Championship	Bonelli, Grillo, Micheli, Borello	40,000	
264	16 March 1955	Estadio Nacional, Santiago (N)	Peru	2–2	1955 South American Championship	Grillo, Cecconato	23,000	
265	27 March 1955	Estadio Nacional, Santiago (N)	Uruguay	6–1	1955 South American Championship	Micheli (2), Labruna (3), Borello	35,000	
266	30 March 1955	Estadio Nacional, Santiago (N)	Chile	1–0	1955 South American Championship	Micheli	65,000	
267	22 January 1956	Estadio Centenario, Montevideo (N)	Peru	2–1	1956 South American Championship	Sívori, Vairo	16,000	
268	29 January 1956	Estadio Centenario, Montevideo (N)	Chile	2–0	1956 South American Championship	Labruna (2)	45,000	
269	1 February 1956	Estadio Centenario, Montevideo (N)	Paraguay	1–0	1956 South American Championship	Cecconato	20,000	
270	5 February 1956	Estadio Centenario, Montevideo (N)	Brazil	0–1	1956 South American Championship		25,000	
271	15 February 1956	Estadio Centenario, Montevideo (N)	Uruguay	0–1	1956 South American Championship		80,000	
272	28 February 1956	Estadio Olímpico Universitario, Mexico City (N)	Peru	0–0	1956 Panamerican Championship		—	
273	6 March 1956	Estadio Olímpico Universitario, Mexico City (N)	Costa Rica	4–3	1956 Panamerican Championship	Maschio, Sívori (3)	—	
274	11 March 1956	Estadio Olímpico Universitario, Mexico City (N)	Chile	3–0	1956 Panamerican Championship	Maschio (2), Sívori	—	
275	13 March 1956	Estadio Olímpico Universitario, Mexico City (N)	Mexico	0–0	1956 Panamerican Championship		—	
276	18 March 1956	Estadio Olímpico Universitario, Mexico City (N)	Brazil	2–2	1956 Panamerican Championship	Yudica, Sívori	—	
277	24 June 1956	Estadio Monumental, Buenos Aires (H)	Italy	1–0	Friendly	Conde	100,000	
278	1 July 1956	Estadio Centenario, Montevideo (A)	Uruguay	2–1	Taça do Atlântico	Grillo (2)	—	
279	8 July 1956	Estadio Presidente Juan Domingo Perón, Avellaneda (H)	Brazil	0–0	Taça do Atlântico		—	
280	15 August 1956	Asunción (A)	Paraguay	1–0	Copa Rosa Chevallier Boutell	Conde	—	
281	19 August 1956	Estadio Gasómetro, Buenos Aires (H)	Czechoslovakia	1–0	Friendly	Angelillo	60,000	
282	10 October 1956	Paysandú (A)	Uruguay	2–1	Friendly	Garabal (2)	—	
283	14 November 1956	Boca Juniors Stadium, Buenos Aires (H)	Uruguay	2–2	Friendly	Grillo, Garabal	—	
284	13 March 1957	Estadio Nacional, Lima (N)	Colombia	8–2	1957 South American Championship	Cruz, Angelillo (2), Maschio (4), Corbatta	42,000	
285	17 March 1957	Estadio Nacional, Lima (N)	Ecuador	3–0	1957 South American Championship	Angelillo (2), Sívori	50,000	
286	20 March 1957	Estadio Nacional, Lima (N)	Uruguay	4–0	1957 South American Championship	Maschio (2), Angelillo, Sanfilippo	40,000	
287	28 March 1957	Estadio Nacional, Lima (N)	Chile	6–2	1957 South American Championship	Sívori, Angelillo (2), Maschio (2), Corbatta	50,000	
288	3 April 1957	Estadio Nacional, Lima (N)	Brazil	3–0	1957 South American Championship	Angelillo, Maschio, Cruz	55,000	
289	6 April 1957	Estadio Nacional, Lima (N)	Peru	1–2	1957 South American Championship	Sívori	50,000	
290	9 April 1957	Estadio Nacional, Lima (N)	Peru	4–1	Friendly	Angelillo, Juarez, Castro, J. Broockers	—	
291	23 May 1957	Estadio Centenario, Montevideo (A)	Uruguay	0–0	Copa Newton		—	
292	5 June 1957	Estadio Jorge Newbery (H)	Uruguay	1–1	Copa Lipton	Angelillo	—	
293	7 July 1957	Maracanã Stadium, Rio de Janeiro (A)	Brazil	2–1	Copa Julio Argentino Roca	Labruna, Juarez	—	
294	10 July 1957	Pacaembu Stadium, São Paulo (A)	Brazil	0–2 (a.e.t.)	Copa Julio Argentino Roca		—	
295	6 October 1957	Nacional, La Paz (A)	Bolivia	0–2	1958 FIFA World Cup qualification		—	
296	13 October 1957	Estadio Nacional, Santiago (A)	Chile	2–0	1958 FIFA World Cup qualification	Menéndez, Conde	—	
297	20 October 1957	Boca Juniors Stadium, Buenos Aires (H)	Chile	4–0	1958 FIFA World Cup qualification	Corbatta (2), Menéndez, Zárate	—	
298	27 October 1957	Estadio de Independiente, Avellaneda (H)	Bolivia	4–0	1958 FIFA World Cup qualification	Zárate, Corbatta, Prado, Menéndez	—	
299	6 April 1958	Estadio Centenario, Montevideo (A)	Uruguay	0–1	Friendly		—	
300	20 April 1958	Asunción (A)	Paraguay	0–1	Friendly		—	
301	26 April 1958	Estadio Presidente Juan Domingo Perón, Avellaneda (H)	Paraguay	2–0	Friendly	Corbatta, Prado	—	
302	30 April 1958	Estadio Jorge Newbery (H)	Uruguay	2–0	Friendly	Menéndez, Sanfilippo	—	
303	8 June 1958	Malmö Stadion, Malmö (N)	West Germany	1–3	1958 FIFA World Cup	Corbatta	31,156	
304	11 June 1958	Örjans Vall, Halmstad (N)	Northern Ireland	3–1	1958 FIFA World Cup	Corbatta, Menéndez, Avio	14,174	
305	15 June 1958	Olympiastadion, Helsingborg (N)	Czechoslovakia	1–6	1958 FIFA World Cup	Corbatta	16,418	
306	7 March 1959	Estadio Monumental, Buenos Aires (N)	Chile	6–1	First 1959 South American Championship	Manfredini (2), Callá, Pizzuti (2), Belén	70,000	
307	11 March 1959	Estadio Monumental, Buenos Aires (N)	Bolivia	2–0	First 1959 South American Championship	Corbatta, Callá	45,000	
308	18 March 1959	Estadio Monumental, Buenos Aires (N)	Peru	3–1	First 1959 South American Championship	Corbatta, Sosa, Benítez (o.g.)	70,000	
309	22 March 1959	Estadio Monumental, Buenos Aires (N)	Paraguay	3–1	First 1959 South American Championship	Corbatta, Sosa, Cap	50,000	
310	30 March 1959	Estadio Monumental, Buenos Aires (N)	Uruguay	4–1	First 1959 South American Championship	Belén (2), Sosa (2)	80,000	
311	4 April 1959	Estadio Monumental, Buenos Aires (N)	Brazil	1–1	First 1959 South American Championship	Pizzuti	85,000	
312	18 November 1959	Estadio Nacional, Santiago (A)	Chile	2–4	Friendly	Sanfilippo, Ruiz	—	
313	9 December 1959	Estadio Modelo, Guayaquil (N)	Paraguay	4–2	Second 1959 South American Championship	Sanfilippo (3), Pizzuti	15,000	
314	12 December 1959	Estadio Modelo, Guayaquil (N)	Ecuador	1–1	Second 1959 South American Championship	Sosa	55,000	
315	16 December 1959	Estadio Modelo, Guayaquil (N)	Uruguay	0–5	Second 1959 South American Championship		50,000	
316	22 December 1959	Estadio Modelo, Guayaquil (N)	Brazil	4–1	Second 1959 South American Championship	García, Sanfilippo (3)	42,000	

Notes

1. A: The Argentina vs. Chile match at the 1942 South American Championships was abandoned after 42 minutes when the Chilean players left the field in protest at the referee's performance. The match was subsequently awarded to Argentina.
2. B: Argentina were awarded the trophy as the visiting team.
3. C: Argentina retained the trophy as defending champions.
4. D: Argentina were awarded the trophy as the visiting team.
5. E: Match abandoned in the first half with the score at 0–0 due to rain.
6. F: Argentina were awarded the trophy as the visiting team.
7. G: Uruguay were awarded the trophy as the visiting team.

== Record by opponent ==
Team	Pld	W	D	L	GF	GA	GD	WPCT
Bolivia	6	5	0	1	24	3	+21	83.33
Brazil	19	10	4	5	44	29	+15	52.63
Chile	17	14	2	1	46	16	+30	82.35
Colombia	3	3	0	0	23	3	+20	100.00
Costa Rica	1	1	0	0	4	3	+1	100.00
Czechoslovakia	2	1	0	1	2	6	−4	50.00
Ecuador	7	6	1	0	32	4	+28	85.71
England	2	1	0	1	4	3	+1	50.00
Ireland	1	1	0	0	1	0	+1	100.00
Italy	2	1	0	1	1	2	−1	50.00
Mexico	1	0	1	0	0	0	0	0.00
Northern Ireland	1	1	0	0	3	1	+2	100.00
Paraguay	20	16	1	3	61	28	+33	80.00
Peru	12	7	4	1	25	13	+12	58.33
Portugal	2	2	0	0	6	2	+4	100.00
Spain	2	2	0	0	2	0	+2	100.00
Uruguay	25	14	6	5	53	29	+24	56.00
West Germany	1	0	0	1	1	3	−2	0.00
Total	124	85	19	20	332	145	+187	68.55

Source: Results
