= José García Pérez =

José García Pérez may refer to:

- José García Pérez (footballer)
- José García Pérez (politician)
