= Víctor Salas =

Víctor Salas may refer to:

- Víctor Salas (footballer, 1935-2021), Peruvian football defender
- Víctor Salas (footballer, born 1980), Spanish football midfielder
