= José Borrello =

José Borrello may refer to:

- José Borello (1929–2013), Argentine footballer
- Carlos Borrello (born 1955), Argentine football manager
