= Valjalo =

Valjalo is a surname. Notable people with the surname include:

- Antonio Valjalo (1926–2013), Chilean footballer
- Brandon Valjalo (born 1998), South African skateboarder
- Oleg Valjalo (born 1970), Croatian politician
