= Pascasio Sola =

Argentine footballer

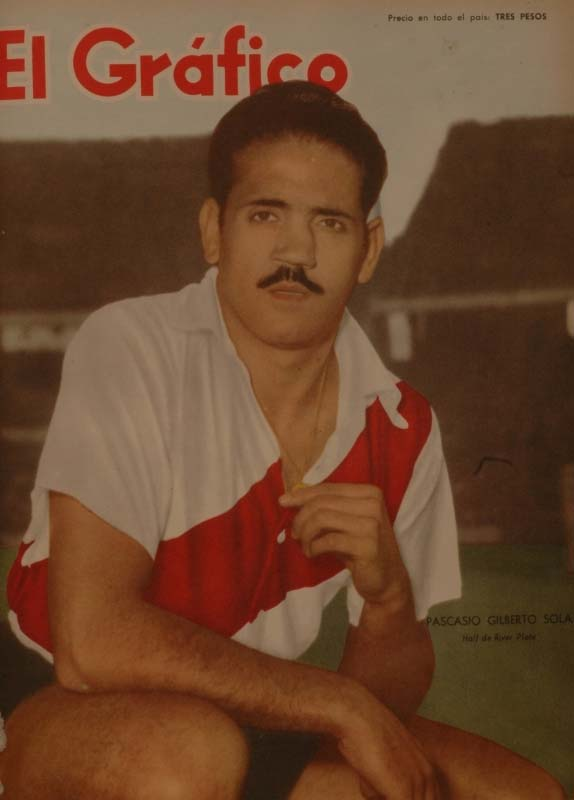
- Sola in 1958

Personal information
- Full name: Pascasio Gilberto Sola
- Date of birth: 8 November 1928
- Place of birth: Buenos Aires, Argentina
- Date of death: 27 November 2002 (aged 74)
- Position: Midfielder

Senior career*
Years	Team	Apps	(Gls)
- Talleres (RE)
1951	River Plate		
1952	Huracán	28	(0)
1953–1958	River Plate		

International career
1955–1957	Argentina	6	(0)
- * Club domestic league appearances and goals

Pascasio Gilberto Sola (8 November 1928 – 27 November 2002) was an Argentine footballer who played as a midfielder, making six appearances for the Argentina national team between 1955 and 1957. He was also part of Argentina's squad for the 1955 South American Championship. In his senior club career, he represented Club Atlético River Plate between 1953 and 1958.
