= Luis Arrieta =

Luis Arrieta may refer to:

- Luis Arrieta (actor) (born 1982), Mexican film actor, television actor producer, director and writer
- Luis Arrieta (footballer) (1914–1972), Argentine footballer
- José Luis Arrieta (born 1971), Spanish road racing cyclist
