= Bagnato =

Bagnato is a surname. Notable people with the surname include:

- Franz Anton Bagnato (1731–1810), German architect
- Johann Caspar Bagnato (1696–1757), German architect
- Luis Bagnato (1924–1997), Argentine footballer
