= Roque Fernández (footballer) =

Uruguayan footballer (died 2011)

Personal information
- Date of death: 14 November 2011
- Place of death: Argentina
- Position: Forward

Youth career
- Rampla Juniors
- Club Nacional

Senior career*
Years	Team	Apps	(Gls)
- Club Nacional
- Estudiantes de la Plata
- Deportivo Cali
- Deportivo Galicia
- Zulia FC

International career
1956–1959	Uruguay	7	(0)

Managerial career
- 1968: Deportivo Galicia
- Zulia FC
- 1981: Club Olimpia
Medal record
Men's football
Representing Uruguay
South American Championship
Winner	1956 Uruguay
- * Club domestic league appearances and goals

Roque Ceferino Fernández Caballero (died 14 November 2011) was a Uruguayan footballer who played as a forward. He was part of Uruguay's squads for the 1956, 1957, 1959 (Ecuador), and 1959 (Argentina) South American Championships.

== Club career ==
Fernández started his senior career at Club Nacional. He then went abroad to play for Argentinian side Estudiantes de La Plata, Colombian Deportivo Cali, and Venezuelan Deportivo Galicia and Zulia FC where he ended his career.

== Managerial career ==
Fernández started his managerial career in Venezuela coaching his former clubs Deportivo Galicia in 1968 and Zulia FC. In 1981 he went to Paraguay to manage Club Olimpia.

== International career ==
Fernández was called up for Uruguay's squad for the 1956 South American Championship but was an unused substitute as Uruguay won the competition on home soil.

He had his first cap against Paraguay on 27 July 1956.

He was again in the squad for the 1957 South American Championship, playing one game against Peru, as Uruguay finished the competition at the third place. This was his second cap.

Once more, he was in Uruguay's squad for the 1959 South American Championship, playing three games. The game against host Argentina was his seventh and last cap.
