= Roqué Marrapodi =

Argentine footballer

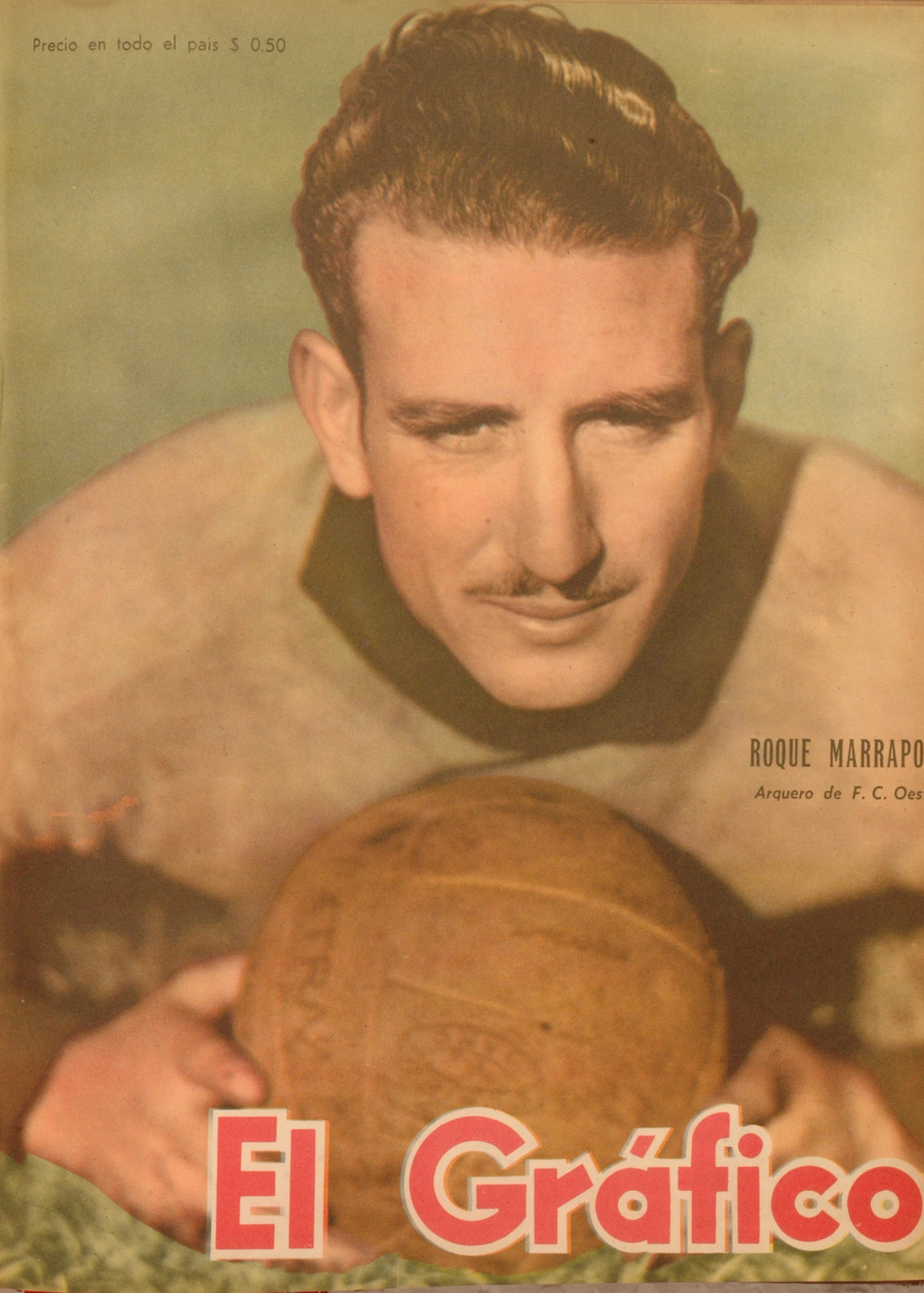

Personal information
- Date of birth: 18 June 1919
- Place of birth: Guaminí, Argentina
- Date of death: 14 June 1994 (aged 74)
- Position: Goalkeeper

International career
| Years | Team | Apps | (Gls) |
| 1954 | Argentina | 2 | (0) |

Roqué Marrapodi (18 June 1919 – 14 June 1994) was an Argentine footballer. He played in two matches for the Argentina national football team in 1954. He was also part of Argentina's squad for the 1955 South American Championship.
