= Paulo Martorano =

Brazilian footballer (1933–2025)

Personal information
- Date of birth: 3 May 1933
- Place of birth: Guaratinguetá, São Paulo, Brazil
- Date of death: 4 February 2025 (aged 91)
- Place of death: Guará, São Paulo, Brazil
- Position: Goalkeeper

Senior career*
Years	Team	Apps	(Gls)
1952–1956	Guarani		
1956–1959	São Paulo		
1959	Comercial (SP)		
1960–1961	CD Oro		

International career
1957	Brazil	1	(0)
- * Club domestic league appearances and goals

Paulo Martorano (3 May 1933 – 4 February 2025) was a Brazilian footballer. He played in one match for the Brazil national football team in 1957. He was also part of Brazil's squad for the 1956 South American Championship. Martorano died on 4 February 2025, at the age of 91.
