= Ladislao Brazionis =

Uruguayan footballer (1929–1986)

Personal information
- Date of birth: 23 June 1929
- Place of birth: Montevideo, Uruguay
- Date of death: 12 January 1986 (aged 56)
- Position: Defender

International career
Years	Team	Apps	(Gls)
1956	Uruguay	5	(0)

Ladislao Brazionis (23 June 1929 – 12 January 1986) was a Uruguayan footballer. He played in five matches for the Uruguay national football team in 1956. He was also part of Uruguay's squad for the 1956 South American Championship. Brazionis died on 12 January 1986, at the age of 56.
