= Luis Miramontes =

Uruguayan footballer (born 1928)

Personal information
- Full name: Luis Alberto Miramontes
- Date of birth: 15 November 1928
- Position: Midfielder

International career
Years	Team	Apps	(Gls)
1956–1959	Uruguay	22	(0)

Luis Alberto Miramontes (born 15 November 1928) was a Uruguayan footballer. He played in 22 matches for the Uruguay national football team from 1956 to 1959. He was also part of Uruguay's squad for the 1956 South American Championship.
