= Alfonso Auscarriaga =

Uruguayan footballer (born 1927)

Personal information
- Date of birth: 7 September 1927 (age 99)
- Position: Forward

Youth career
- Club Nacional

Senior career*
Years	Team	Apps	(Gls)
1946-1948	Club Nacional		
1949-1956	Danubio		
1957-1958	Defensor		

International career
1956	Uruguay	4	(0)
Medal record
Men's football
Representing Uruguay
South American Championship
Winner	1956 Uruguay
- * Club domestic league appearances and goals

Alfonso Auscarriaga (born 7 September 1927) is a Uruguayan former footballer who played as a forward. He was part of Uruguay’s squad that won the 1956 South American Championship on home soil.

== Club career ==
Born in 1927, Auscarriaga started his career at Club Nacional. He then went to Danubio. Auscarriaga ended his career at Defensor in the 1957-1958 season.

== International career ==
Auscarriaga was named in Uruguay’s squad for the 1956 South American Championship. He earned his two first caps during the competition. Auscarriaga played against Peru and the last game against Argentina, which Uruguay won, enabling them to win the competition. After the tournament, he had two more caps with Uruguay, against Argentina on 1 July 1956, and against Paraguay on 27 July 1956.
