= Julião (footballer, born 1929) =

Brazilian footballer

Personal information
- Full name: Antonio Elias Julião
- Date of birth: 11 April 1929
- Place of birth: Piracicaba, São Paulo
- Date of death: 25 October 2013 (aged 84)
- Position: Midfielder

Senior career*
Years	Team	Apps	(Gls)
1950–1957	Corinthians	253	(3)
1954	→ Linense (loan)	20	(1)
1957–1962	Botafogo-SP		

International career
1956	Brazil	1	(0)
- * Club domestic league appearances and goals

Antonio Elías Julião (11 April 1929 – 25 October 2013), known as just Julião, was a Brazilian footballer. He played in one match for the Brazil national football team in 1956. He was also part of Brazil's squad for the 1956 South American Championship.
