= Carlos Espinoza (footballer, born 1928) =

Chilean footballer (1928–2024)

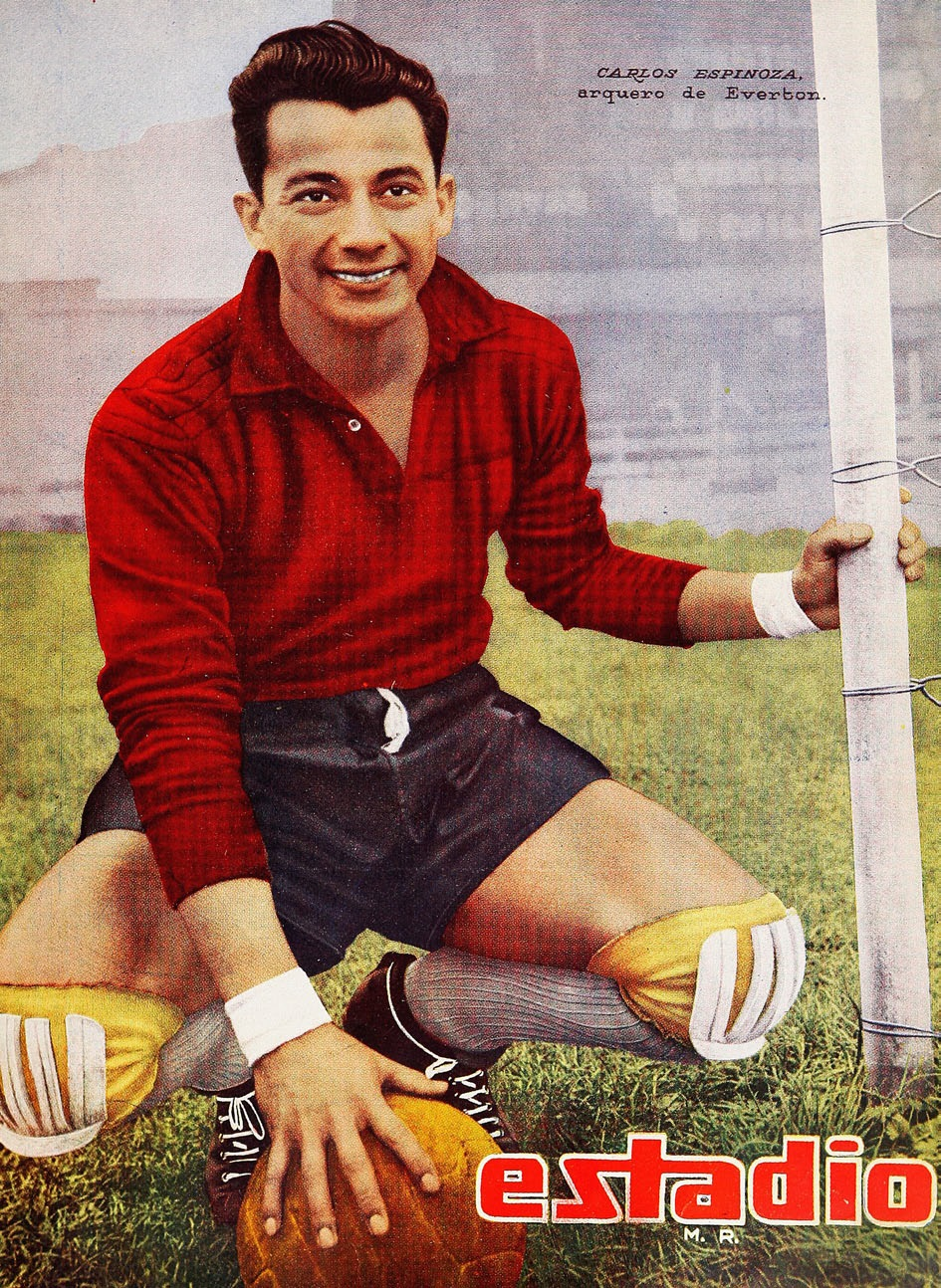
- Espinoza in 1951

Personal information
- Full name: Carlos Enrique Espinoza Marambio
- Date of birth: 21 April 1928
- Date of death: 25 February 2024 (aged 95)
- Height: 1.72 m (5 ft 8 in)
- Position: Goalkeeper

Senior career*
Years	Team	Apps	(Gls)
1948–1958	Everton de Viña del Mar		
1959–1960	Santiago Wanderers		

International career
1956	Chile	3	(0)
- * Club domestic league appearances and goals

Carlos Enrique Espinoza Marambio (21 April 1928 – 25 February 2024) was a Chilean footballer who played as a goalkeeper. He made three appearances for the Chile national team in 1956. He was also part of Chile's squad for the 1955, and 1956 South American Championship.

Espinoza died on 25 February 2024, at the age of 95.
