= Arnaldo Balay =

Argentine footballer

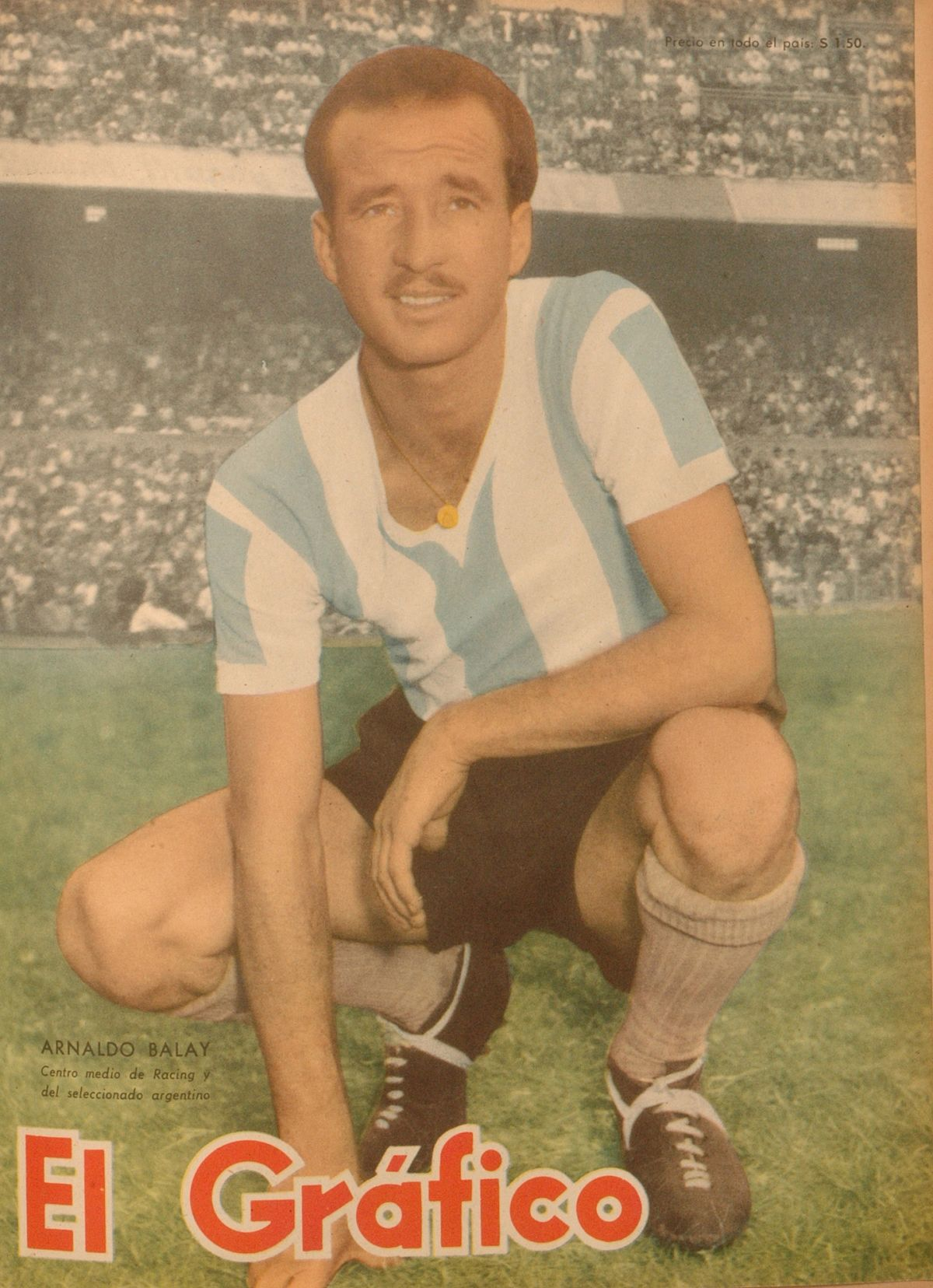

Personal information
- Date of birth: 2 September 1928
- Place of birth: Alsina, Buenos Aires Province, Argentina
- Date of death: 28 September 2006 (aged 78)
- Position: Defender

International career
Years	Team	Apps	(Gls)
1955–1958	Argentina	3	(0)

Arnaldo Balay (2 September 1928 – 28 September 2006) was an Argentine footballer. He played in three matches for the Argentina national football team from 1955 to 1958. He was also part of Argentina's squad for the 1955 South American Championship.
