= Francisco Nitsche =

Chilean footballer (1930–2018)

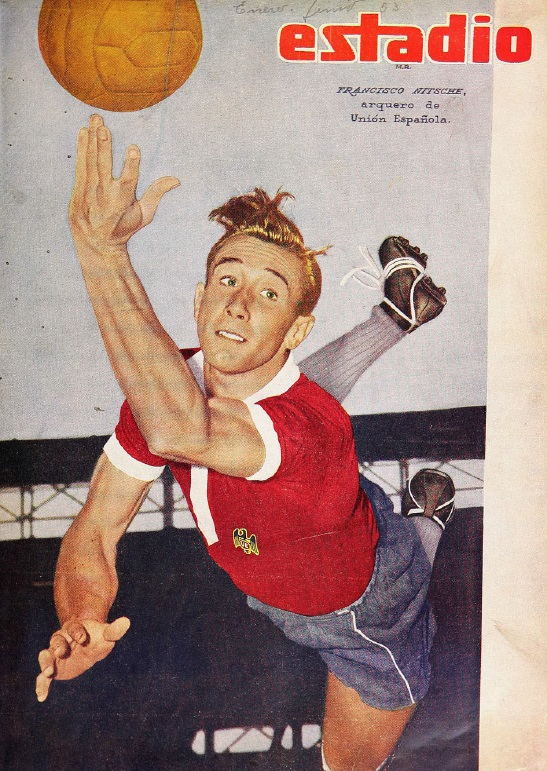

Personal information
- Full name: Francisco José Carlos Nitsche Compán
- Date of birth: 20 February 1930
- Place of birth: Santiago, Chile
- Date of death: 23 October 2018 (aged 88)
- Position: Goalkeeper

Youth career
- Instituto Nacional
- 1948–1949: Unión Española

Senior career*
Years	Team	Apps	(Gls)
1950–1965	Unión Española		
1966–1968	Audax Italiano	39	(0)

International career
1957–1965	Chile	6	(0)
- * Club domestic league appearances and goals

Francisco José Carlos Nitsche Compán (20 February 1930 – 23 October 2018) was a Chilean footballer who played as a goalkeeper.

== Career ==
As a youth player, Nitsche was with the team of Instituto Nacional, mainly as substitute of Sergio Litvak, who was the goalkeeper of Universidad Católica that won the Chilean Primera División title in 1954. He joined the Unión Española youth system in 1948 and was promoted to the first team in 1950, staying with them until 1965. He ended his career with Audax Italiano from 1966 to 1968.

He played in six matches for the Chile national football team from 1957 to 1965. He was also part of Chile's squad for the 1956 South American Championship.

== Personal life ==
His paternal grandfather was German and his mother was Andalucian.

== Honours ==
Unión Española

- Primera División: 1951

Chile

- Copa del Pacífico: 1965
