= José García Pérez (footballer) =

Argentine footballer (born 1921)

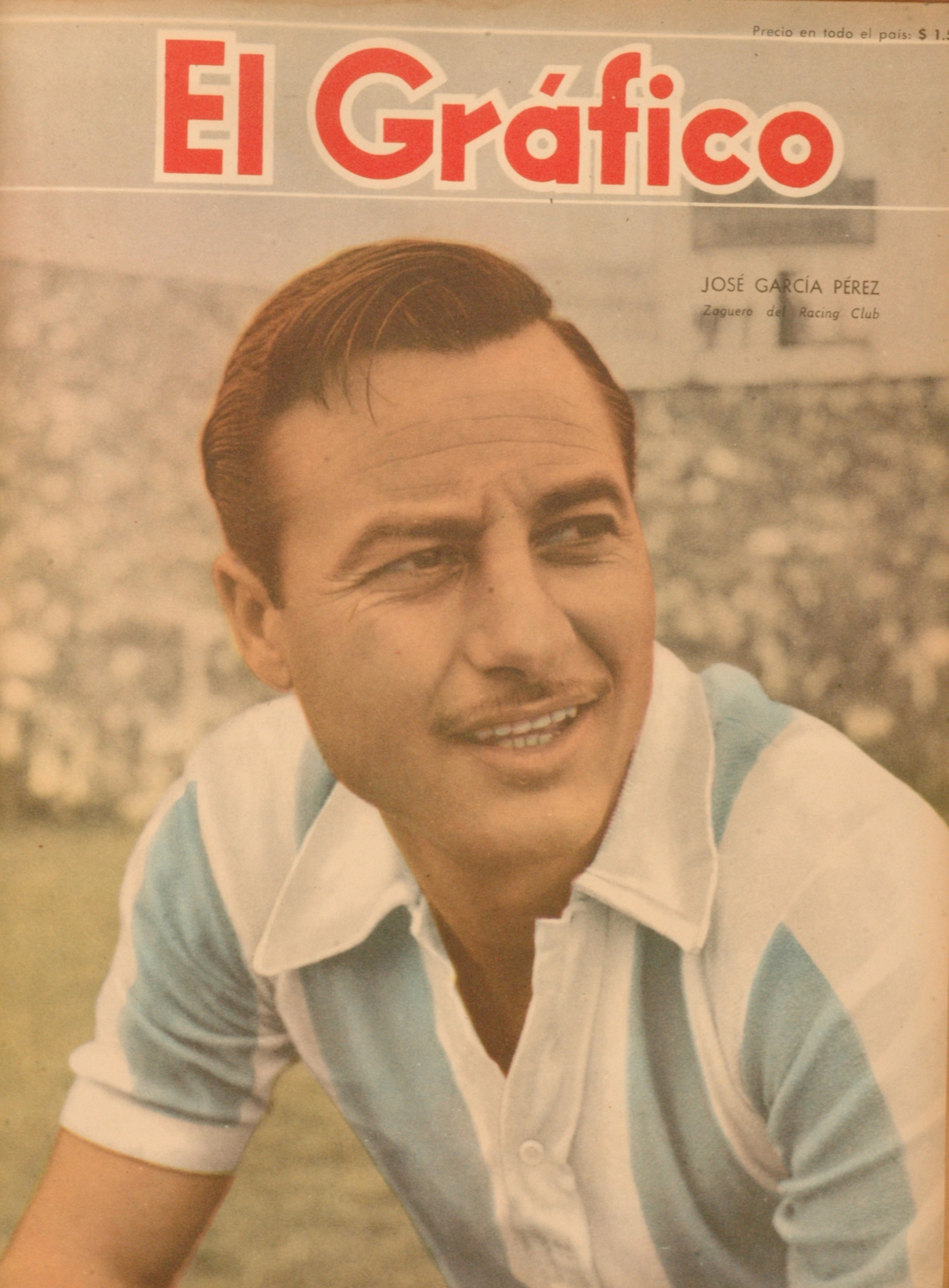

Personal information
- Date of birth: 3 December 1921
- Place of birth: Lanús, Argentina
- Position: Defender

International career
Years	Team	Apps	(Gls)
1951–1956	Argentina	6	(0)

José García Pérez (born 3 December 1921) was an Argentine footballer. He played in six matches for the Argentina national football team from 1951 to 1956. He was also part of Argentina's squad for the 1956 South American Championship.
