= Carlos Correa (footballer) =

Uruguayan footballer (1936–2013)

Personal information
- Date of birth: 30 April 1936
- Date of death: 24 May 2013 (aged 77)
- Position: Defender

International career
Years	Team	Apps	(Gls)
1957	Uruguay	9	(1)

Carlos Correa (30 April 1936 – 24 May 2013) was a Uruguayan footballer. He played in nine matches for the Uruguay national football team in 1957. He was also part of Uruguay's squad for the 1957 South American Championship.
