= Rodolfo Almeyda =

Chilean footballer (1923–2006)

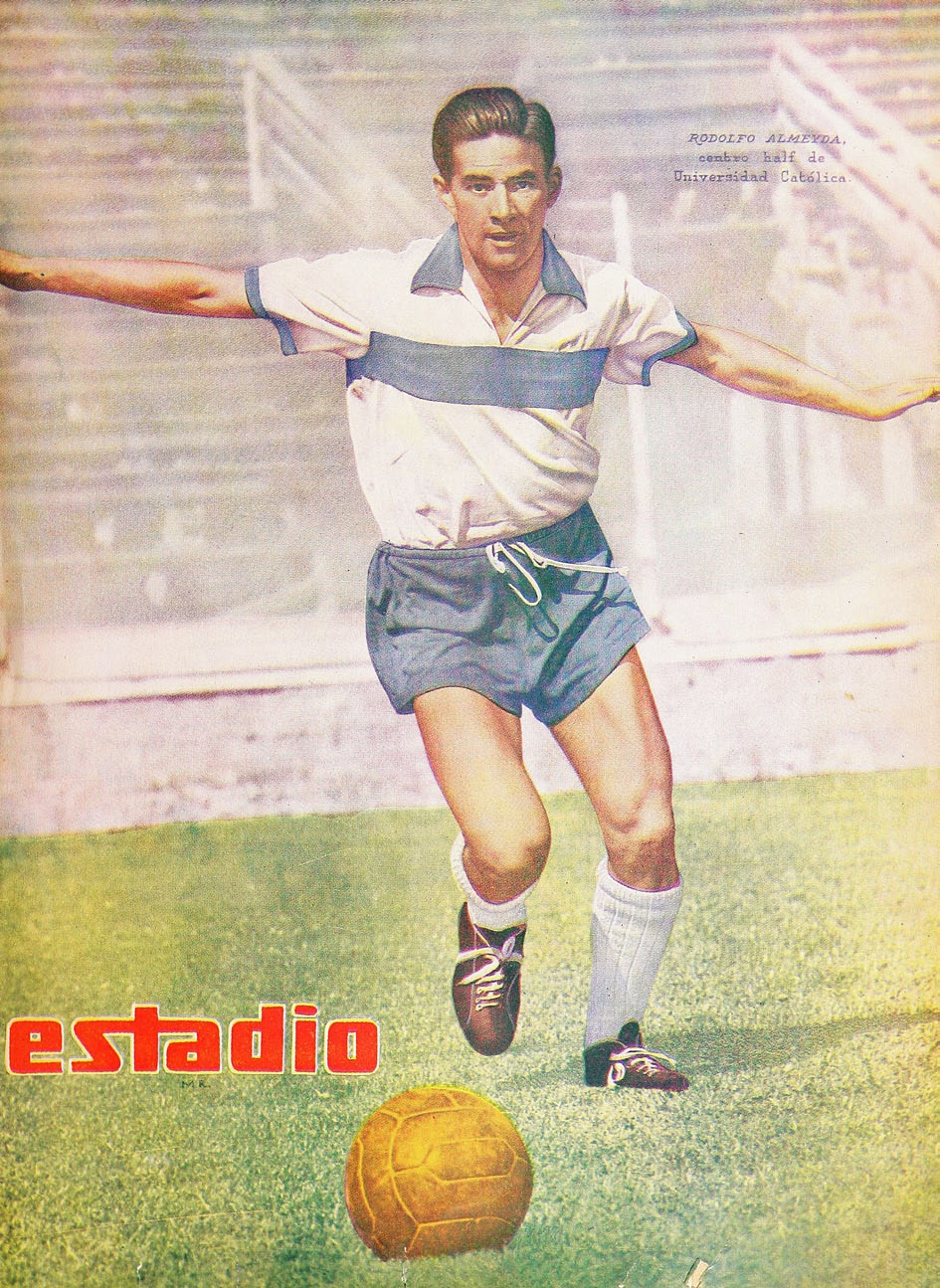

Personal information
- Date of birth: 10 June 1923
- Place of birth: Argentina
- Date of death: 12 July 2006 (aged 83)
- Positions: Midfielder; defender

Senior career*
Years	Team	Apps	(Gls)
- Racing Club de Avellaneda
- Universidad Católica
- Unión Española
- Palestino

International career
1954–1960	Chile	22	
Medal record
First place	Chilean Primera División	1949
First place	Chilean Primera División	1955
Second place	South American Championship	1956
- * Club domestic league appearances and goals

Rodolfo Almeyda Morando (10 June 1923 – 12 July 2006) was an Argentine, naturalized Chilean, footballer who played as a midfielder or defender, usually in the position of centre-half. Almeyda played his early career in Argentina for Avellaneda Racing Club, and transferred to Chile in 1944. He initially won his fame playing for Universidad Católica, and later played for Unión Española and Palestino. He was part of the 1949 Universidad Católica team that won the Primera División de Chile and was also part of the 1955 Palestino team that won the Primera División de Chile.

In Argentina as well as the early years in Chile he played as a central midfielder, but later in his career, during his period in Palestino, he moved to the role of centre-back, and was known in particular for his technique and ability in the air. Following his nationalization, he played 22 games for Chile's national squad from 1954 to 1960. Famously he was part of the team that beat Brazil 4–1 during the 1956 South American Championship in Uruguay, helping his side to a second-place finish in the tournament.

== Honours ==
Universidad Católica

- Primera División de Chile: 1949

Palestino

- Primera División de Chile: 1955
