= Darío Segovia =

Paraguayan footballer (1932–1994)

Personal information
- Full name: Darío Segovia Castagnino
- Date of birth: 18 March 1932
- Place of birth: Paraguay
- Date of death: 20 January 1994 (aged 61)
- Position: Defender

Senior career*
Years	Team	Apps	(Gls)
- Club Sol de América

International career
- Paraguay
- * Club domestic league appearances and goals

Darío Segovia Castagnino (18 March 1932 – 20 January 1994) was a Paraguayan football defender who played for Paraguay in the 1958 FIFA World Cup. He also played for Club Sol de América.
