= Luis Bagnato =

Argentine footballer

Personal information
- Date of birth: 10 May 1924
- Date of death: 10 December 1997 (aged 73)
- Position: Defender

International career
Years	Team	Apps	(Gls)
1955	Argentina	1	(0)

Luis Bagnato (10 May 1924 – 10 December 1997) was an Argentine footballer. He played in one match for the Argentina national football team in 1955. He was also part of Argentina's squad for the 1955 South American Championship.
