= Gabino Arregui =

Argentine footballer

Personal information
- Date of birth: 7 November 1914
- Date of death: 19 May 1991 (aged 76)
- Position: Forward

International career
Years	Team	Apps	(Gls)
1940–1941	Argentina	7	(2)

Gabino Arregui (7 November 1914 – 19 May 1991) was an Argentine footballer. He played in seven matches for the Argentina national football team in 1940 and 1941. He was also part of Argentina's squad for the 1941 South American Championship.
