= Guillermo Escalada =

Uruguayan footballer (1936–2023)

Personal information
- Full name: Guillermo Escalada Píriz
- Date of birth: 24 April 1936
- Place of birth: Uruguay
- Date of death: 21 June 2023 (aged 87)
- Position: Forward

Senior career*
Years	Team	Apps	(Gls)
1954–1963	Nacional	289	(116)
1964–1966	Gimnasia de La Plata	26	(3)
1966–1967	Montevideo Wanderers		

International career
1955–1962	Uruguay	30	(11)
Medal record
Men's football
Representing Uruguay
South American Championship
Winner	1956 Uruguay
Winner	1959 Ecuador
- * Club domestic league appearances and goals

Guillermo Escalada Píriz (24 April 1936 – 21 June 2023) was a Uruguayan footballer who played as a forward. He was part of Uruguay’s squad for the 1962 FIFA World Cup, though he was an unused substitute. He also played in 4 editions of the Copa America : 1955, 1956, 1959 (Argentina), and 1959 (Ecuador), winning two times the competition.

== Career ==
Escalada began playing club football with Club Nacional de Football, where he would win league titles in 1956, 1957 and 1958. He also played for Gimnasia de La Plata and Montevideo Wanderers.

Escalada scored eleven goals in 30 appearances for the Uruguay national team.

== Death ==
Escalada died on 21 June 2023, at the age of 87.

== Career statistics ==
National team	Year	Apps	Goals
Uruguay	1955	1	0
Uruguay	1956	5	3
Uruguay	1957	0	0
Uruguay	1958	0	0
Uruguay	1959	10	5
Uruguay	1960	5	1
Uruguay	1961	3	2
Uruguay	1962	6	0
Total		30	11
