= Clímaco Cañarte =

Ecuadorian footballer (born 1936)

Personal information
- Full name: Clímaco Eduardo Cañarte Arboleda
- Date of birth: 5 February 1936 (age 90)

International career
Years	Team	Apps	(Gls)
1963–1967	Ecuador	3	(0)

Clímaco Cañarte (born 5 February 1936) is an Ecuadorian footballer. He played in three matches for the Ecuador national football team from 1963 to 1967. He was also part of Ecuador's squad for the 1963 South American Championship.
