= Hugo Mejía =

Ecuadorian footballer (1931-2010)

Personal information
- Date of birth: 21 November 1931
- Date of death: 2 April 2010 (aged 78)

International career
| Years | Team | Apps | (Gls) |
| 1963 | Ecuador | 6 | (0) |

Hugo Mejía (21 November 1931 – 2 April 2010) was an Ecuadorian footballer. He played in six matches for the Ecuador national football team in 1963. He was also part of Ecuador's squad for the 1963 South American Championship.
