= Roberto Belangero =

Brazilian footballer

Roberto Belangero (São Paulo, June 28, 1928 – São Paulo, October 30, 1996) was a Brazilian football (soccer) player. He is considered one of the best defensive midfielders in Corinthians history.

He also played in the Brazil national football team, but was forced to miss the 1958 World Cup in Sweden due to an injury. He played for Brazil in the 1956 and 1957 South American Championships.
