= Isaac Andrade =

Peruvian footballer (1937–2018)

Personal information
- Full name: Isaac Francisco Andrade Casaboza
- Date of birth: 13 July 1937
- Place of birth: Lima, Peru
- Date of death: 2 April 2018 (aged 80)
- Place of death: Lima, Peru
- Height: 1.71 m (5 ft 7 in)
- Position: Right-back

Senior career*
Years	Team	Apps	(Gls)
1954–1960	Sport Boys		
1961	Defensor Lima		
1962	Ferro Carril Oeste	21	(0)
1963	Vélez Sarsfield	18	(1)
1964–1966	Atlanta	50	(1)
1966–1969	Quilmes	73	(0)
1970–1971	Sport Boys		

International career
1956–1960	Peru	5	(0)
- * Club domestic league appearances and goals

Isaac Francisco Andrade Casaboza (13 July 1937 – 2 April 2018) is a Peruvian professional footballer who played as right-back.

== Playing career ==
=== Club career ===
A Sport Boys player from 1954 to 1960, "Paco" Andrade notably captained the team that won the Peruvian championship in 1958. After a brief stint with Defensor Lima in 1961, he emigrated to Argentina, where he would spend a large part of his career. He played for four Argentine clubs between 1962 and 1969 (Ferro Carril Oeste, Vélez Sarsfield, Atlanta and Quilmes), making a total of 162 appearances (scoring two goals).

Returning to Peru, he rejoined Sport Boys in 1970. During a training session with the club, he was struck in the face by a shot from striker Wálter Daga, which caused a detachment of his right retina; he lost his sight a few years later.

=== International career ===
Peruvian international "Paco" Andrade played three matches in the 1956 South American Championship in Montevideo, Uruguay. He made five appearances for the Peruvian national team between 1956 and 1960 (no goals scored).

== Death ==
Isaac Andrade died in the Rímac district of Lima on 2 April 2018.

== Honours ==
Sport Boys

- Peruvian Primera División: 1958
