= Ángel Laferrara =

Argentine footballer

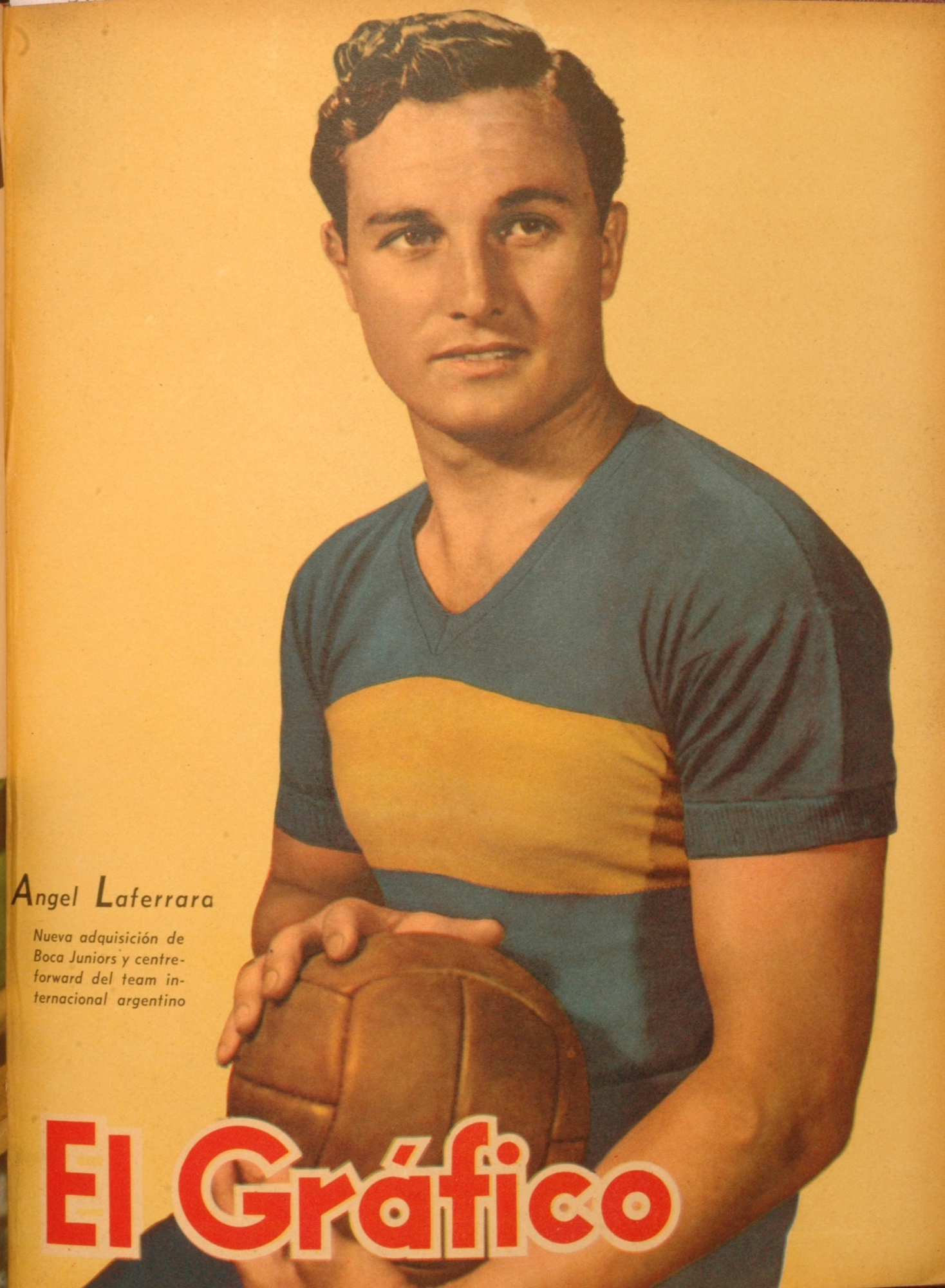

Personal information
- Full name: Angel Ricardo Laferrara
- Date of birth: 27 March 1917
- Position: Forward

Senior career*
Years	Team	Apps	(Gls)
1936–1941	Estudiantes	78	(86)
1942	Boca Juniors	15	(8)
1943	Club Atlético Peñarol		
1944	Ferro Carril Oeste	18	(7)
1945	Nueva Chicago		
1946-48	Unión Española		
1949	Argentino de Quilmes		

International career
1940–1942	Argentina	6	(5)
- * Club domestic league appearances and goals

Ángel Laferrara (born 27 March 1917, date of death unknown) was an Argentine footballer. He was a talented striker.

== Career ==
Laferrara started his career in 1936, playing for Estudiantes de La Plata, where he scored 86 goals in 78 games. His performance was noted by Boca Juniors, who bought him in 1942. He only played 15 games in Boca, scoring 8 goals. At the end of the season he was sent, on loan, to Club Atlético Peñarol as part of the transfer fee for Severino Varela. He played well in Peñarol, scoring twice in the 1943 Torneo de Honor final, against Nacional. At the end of the season, again, he was sent to Ferro Carril Oeste, where he scored 7 games in 18 games. In 1945, he played for Nueva Chicago, in the Primera B, Argentina Second Division. In 1946, he moved to Chile, where he played for Unión Española. He retired in 1949, playing for Argentino de Quilmes.

He played in six matches for the Argentina national football team from 1940 to 1942. He was also part of Argentina's squad for the 1942 South American Championship.
