= Antonio Valjalo =

Chilean footballer (1926-2013)

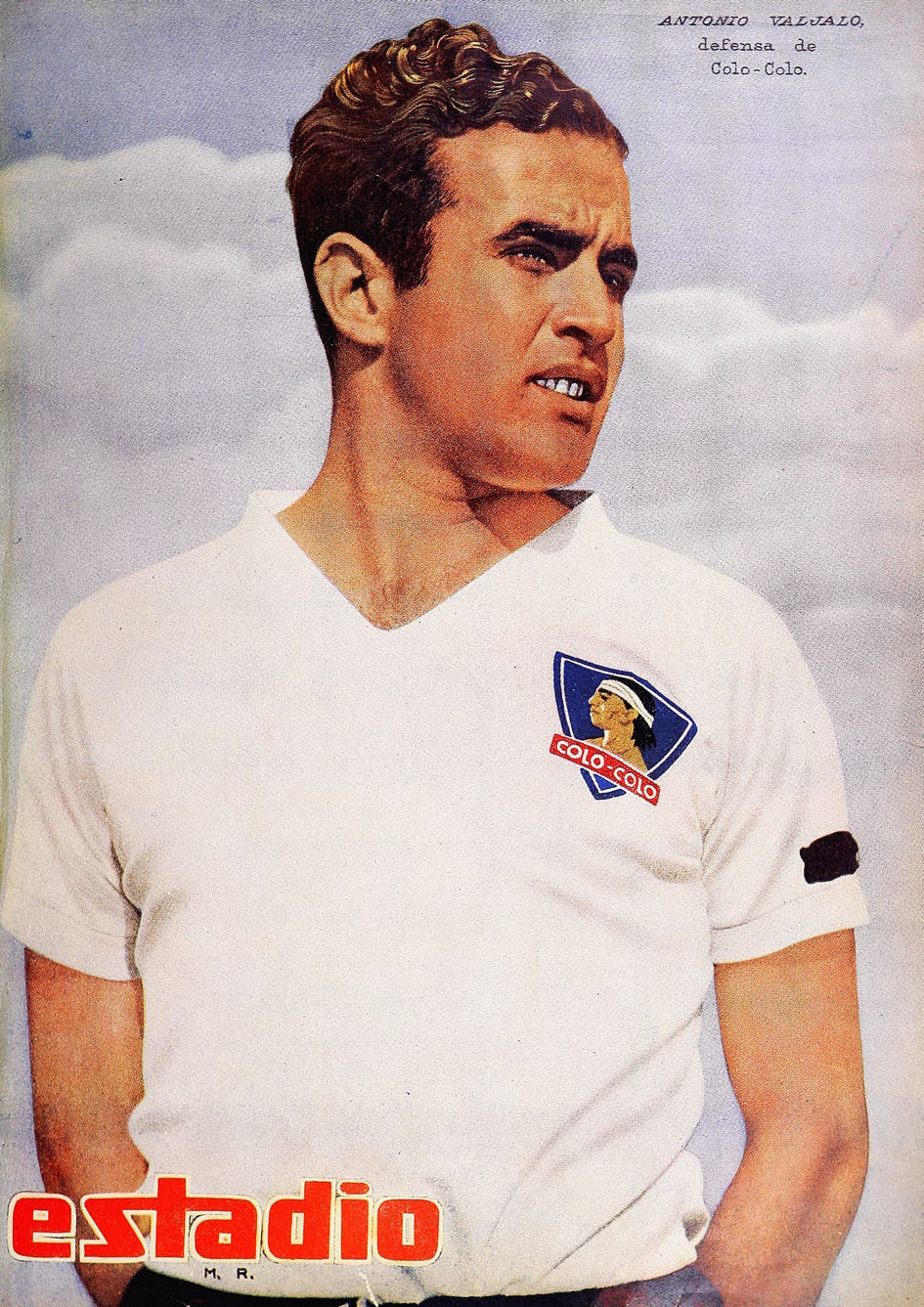

Personal information
- Full name: René Antonio Valjalo Ramírez
- Date of birth: 6 May 1926
- Place of birth: Humberstone, Chile
- Date of death: 8 July 2013 (aged 87)
- Position: Defender

International career
| Years | Team | Apps | (Gls) |
| 1953–1955 | Chile | 2 | (0) |

Antonio Valjalo (6 May 1926 – 8 July 2013) was a Chilean footballer. He played in two matches for the Chile national football team from 1953 to 1955. He was also part of Chile's squad for the 1955 South American Championship.
