= Norberto Conde =

Argentine footballer

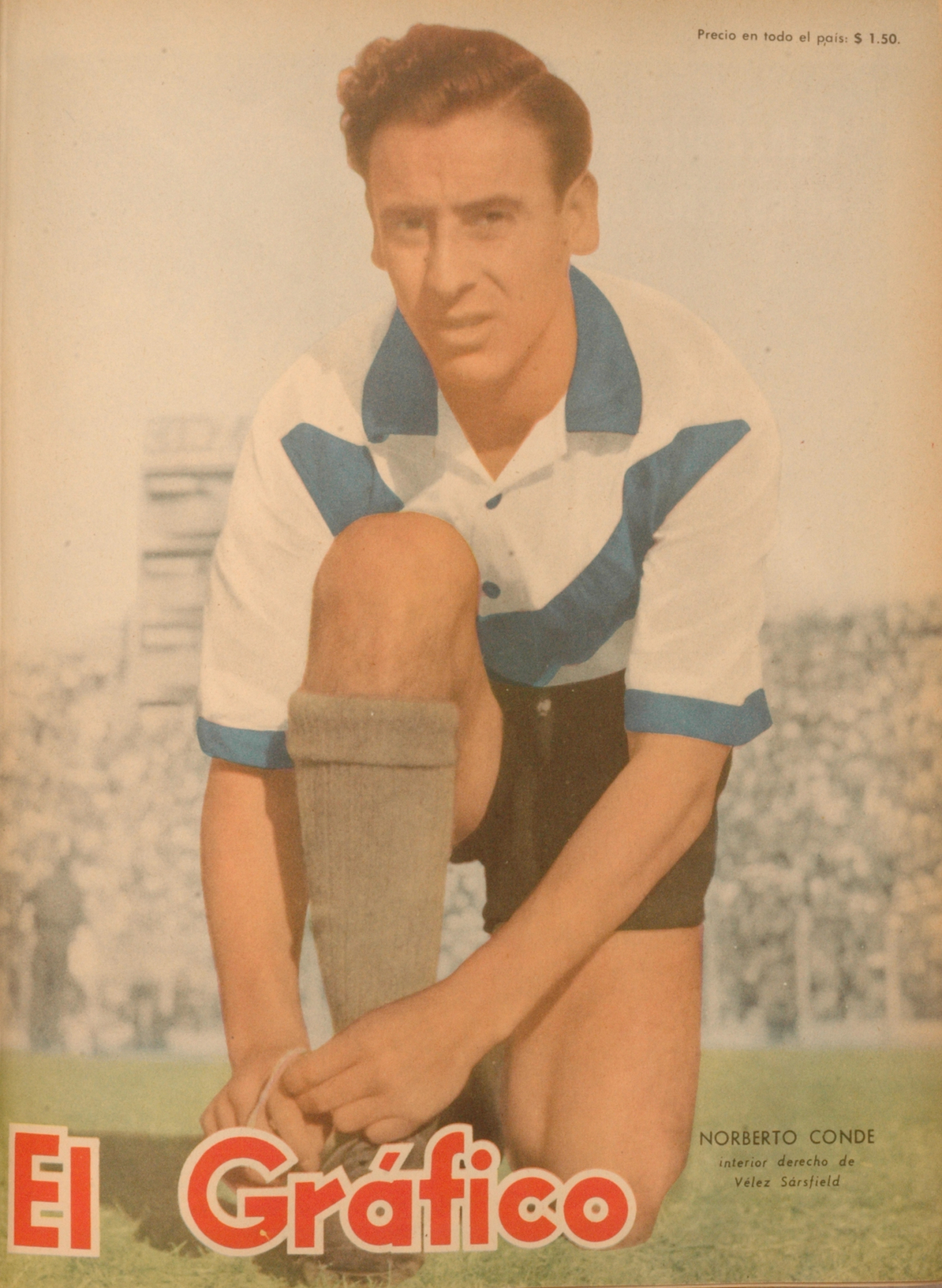

Personal information
- Date of birth: 14 March 1931
- Place of birth: Buenos Aires, Argentina
- Date of death: 8 September 2014 (aged 83)
- Place of death: Buenos Aires, Argentina
- Position: Midfielder

Senior career*
Years	Team	Apps	(Gls)
1952–1959	Vélez Sarsfield	224	(108)
1960	Huracán	22	(10)
1961–1963	Atlanta		(7)
1964	Ferro Carril Oeste	11	(1)
1965	Vélez Sarsfield		
1966	América de Cali		

International career
1955–1958	Argentina	13	(3)
- * Club domestic league appearances and goals

Norberto Conde (14 March 1931 – 8 September 2014) was an Argentine footballer. He was capped by the Argentina national team between 1955 and 1958, scoring three goals.

== Career statistics ==
=== International ===
National team	Year	Apps	Goals
Argentina	1955	1	0
Argentina	1956	7	2
Argentina	1957	3	1
Argentina	1958	2	0
Total		13	3

=== International goals ===
Scores and results list Argentina's goal tally first.

No	Date	Venue	Opponent	Score	Result	Competition
1.	24 June 1956	Estadio Monumental Antonio Vespucio Liberti, Buenos Aires, Argentina	Italy	1–0	1–0	Friendly
2.	15 August 1956	Asunción, Paraguay	Paraguay	1–0	1–0	Rosa Chevallier
3.	13 October 1957	Santiago, Chile	Chile	2–0	2–0	1958 FIFA World Cup qualification
