= Roberto Castillo (footballer, born 1930) =

Peruvian footballer (born 1930)

Personal information
- Full name: Roberto Castillo Tardío
- Date of birth: 29 April 1930 (age 96)
- Place of birth: Chincha Alta, Peru
- Position: Forward

Senior career*
Years	Team	Apps	(Gls)
1946–1958	Alianza Lima		

International career
1952–1957	Peru	18	(1)
- * Club domestic league appearances and goals

Roberto Castillo Tardío (born on 29 April 1930) is a former Peruvian professional footballer who played as forward.

Along with his brother, Félix Castillo, also a footballer, they played for Alianza Lima in the 1950s.

== Playing career ==
Nicknamed Chupón, Roberto Castillo played for Alianza Lima from 1946 to 1958, winning four Peruvian championships in 1948, 1952, 1954 and 1955.

A Peruvian international from 1952 to 1957, he earned 18 caps for the national team, scoring one goal. He participated in four South American championships: in 1953 in Peru, 1955 in Chile – where he scored his only international goal against Uruguay – 1956 in Uruguay, and 1957 in Peru. He also played in the 1952 Panamerican Championship (three matches).

== Honours ==
Alianza Lima

- Peruvian Primera División (4): 1948, 1952, 1954, 1955
