= Luis Arrieta (footballer) =

Argentine footballer (1914–1972)

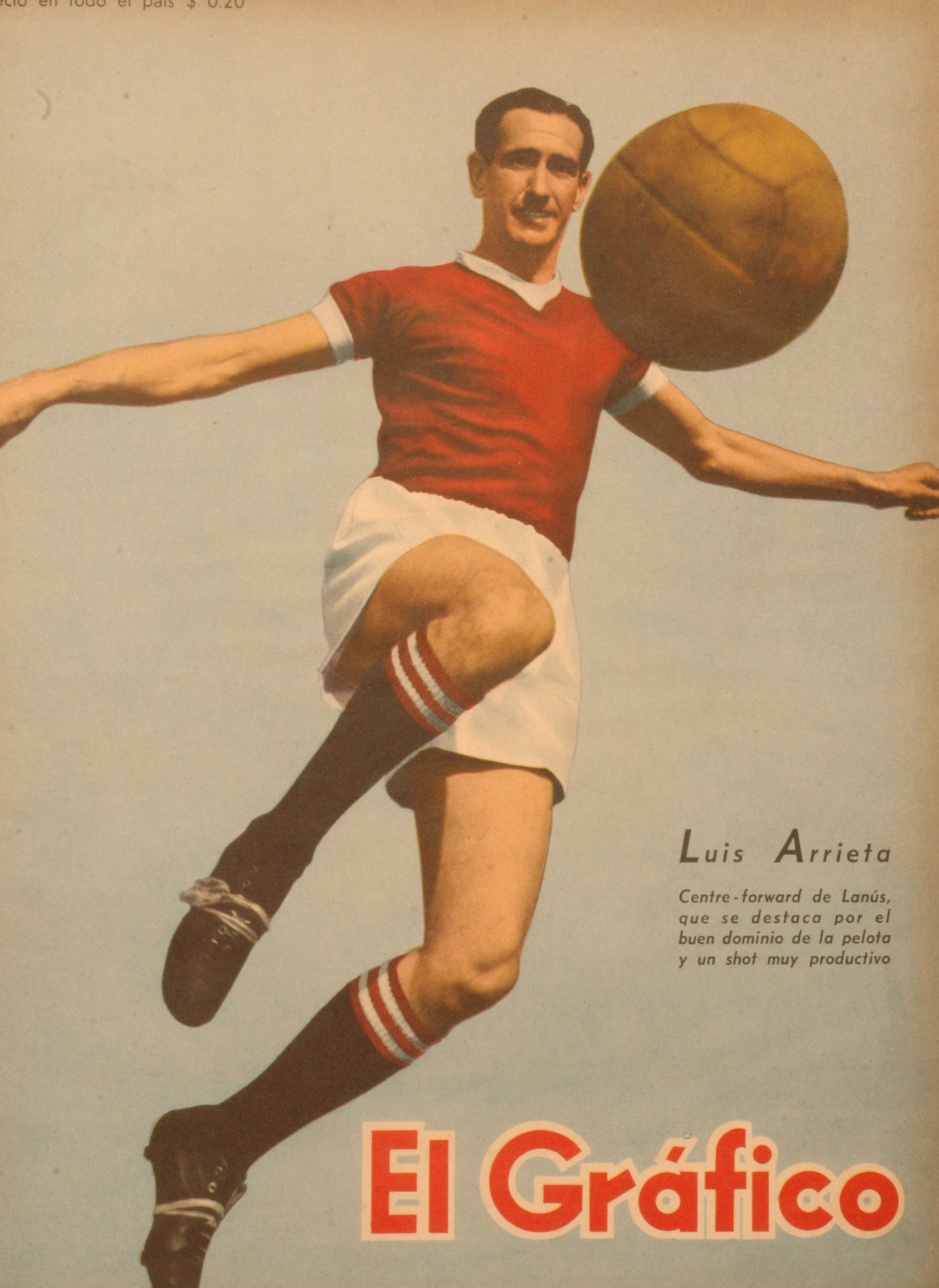

Personal information
- Date of birth: 8 March 1914
- Date of death: 9 July 1972 (aged 58)
- Position: Forward

International career
Years	Team	Apps	(Gls)
1939–1941	Argentina	9	(6)

Luis Arrieta (8 March 1914 – 9 July 1972) was an Argentine footballer. He played in nine matches for the Argentina national football team from 1939 to 1941. He was also part of Argentina's squad for the 1941 South American Championship.
