= Enrique Hormazábal =

Chilean footballer (1931-1999)

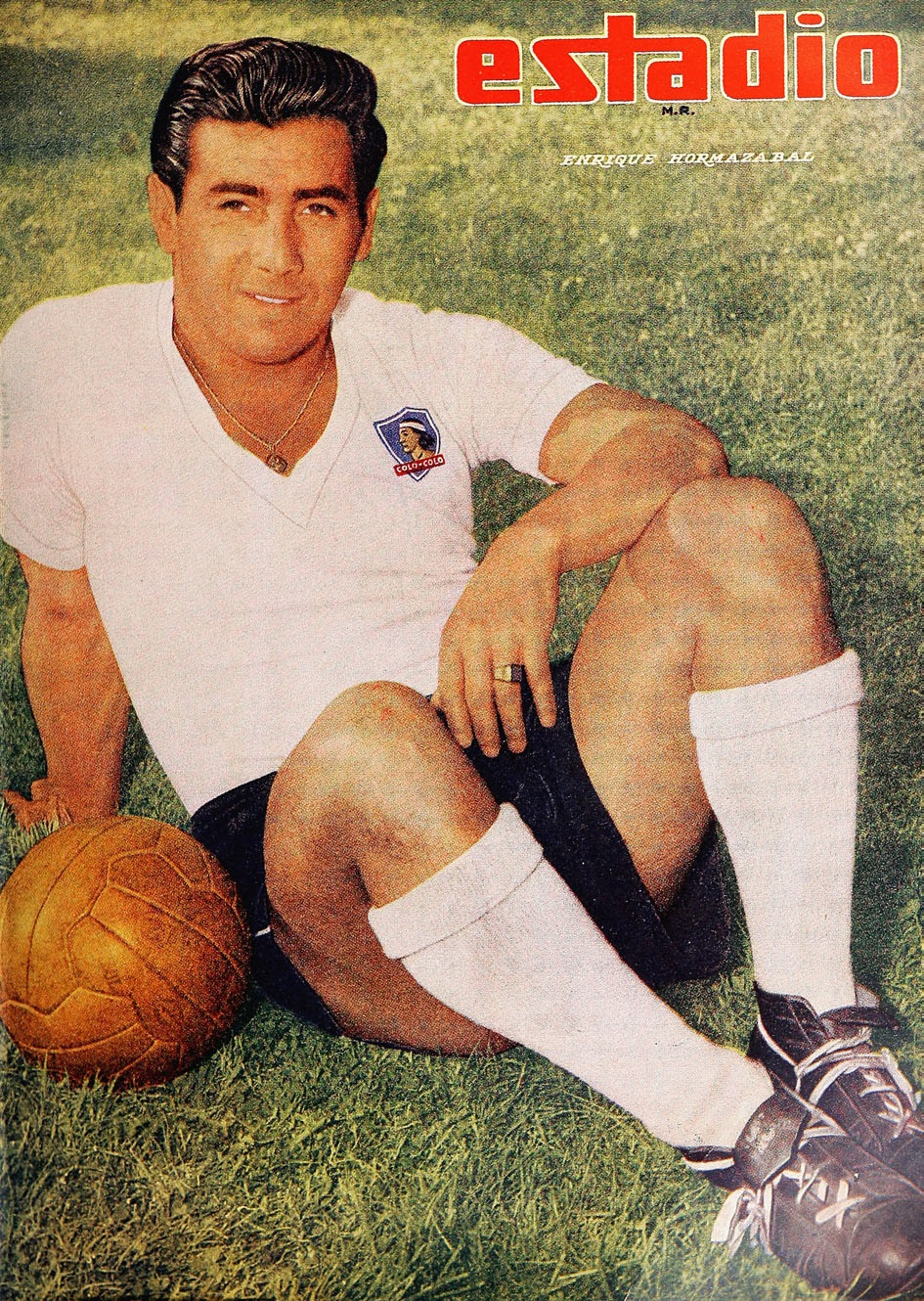

Personal information
- Full name: Daniel Enrique Hormazábal Silva
- Date of birth: January 6, 1931
- Place of birth: Santiago, Chile
- Date of death: April 18, 1999 (aged 68)
- Place of death: Santiago, Chile
- Position: Midfielder

Senior career*
Years	Team	Apps	(Gls)
1948–1955	Santiago Morning		
1956–1963	Colo-Colo	178	(85)

International career
1950–1963	Chile	43	(20)

Managerial career
- 1969–1970: Colo-Colo
- 1974–1975: Santiago Morning
- 1976: Coquimbo Unido
- 1977: Ñublense
- 1979: Santiago Morning
- 1983: Santiago Morning
- * Club domestic league appearances and goals

Daniel Enrique "Cua cuá" Hormazábal Silva (January 6, 1931 – April 18, 1999) was a Chilean footballer, born in Santiago, who played as a right winger for Colo-Colo and the Chile national football team.

== Playing career ==
He played a significant role at the 1955 and 1956 editions of the Copa America where Chile would finish as runners-ups.

== Managerial career ==
From 1969 to 1970, he managed Colo-Colo for 27 matches. In 1976, he managed Coquimbo Unido in the Chilean Segunda División along with José Sulantay as assistant. In 1979 he managed Santiago Morning.

== Personal life ==
His nickname, Cua Cua, was due to the price of the taxi to go home: forty cents ("Cuarenta centavos" in Spanish).

== Honors ==
Colo-Colo

- Chilean League: 1956, 1960, 1963

Individual

- South American Championship player of the tournament: 1955
