= Ricardo Bonelli =

Argentine footballer (1932–2009)

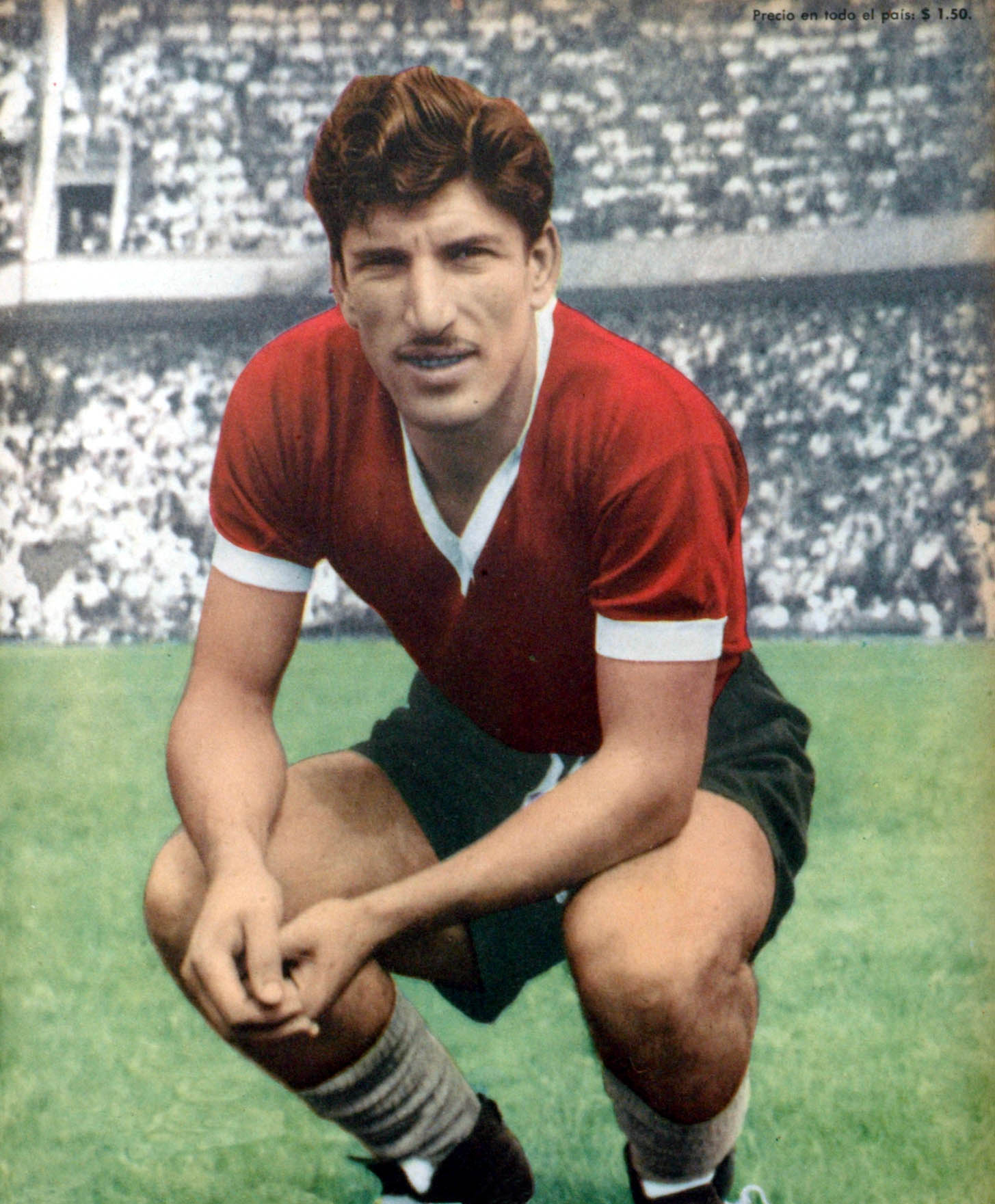
- Ricardo Bonelli

Personal information
- Date of birth: 28 October 1932
- Place of birth: Lanús, Argentina
- Date of death: 25 July 2009 (aged 76)

International career
Years	Team	Apps	(Gls)
1954–1956	Argentina	8	(1)

Ricardo Bonelli (28 October 1932 – 25 July 2009) was an Argentine footballer. He played in eight matches for the Argentina national football team from 1954 to 1956. He was also part of Argentina's squad for the 1956 South American Championship.
