= Rodolfo Micheli =

Argentine footballer (1930–2022)

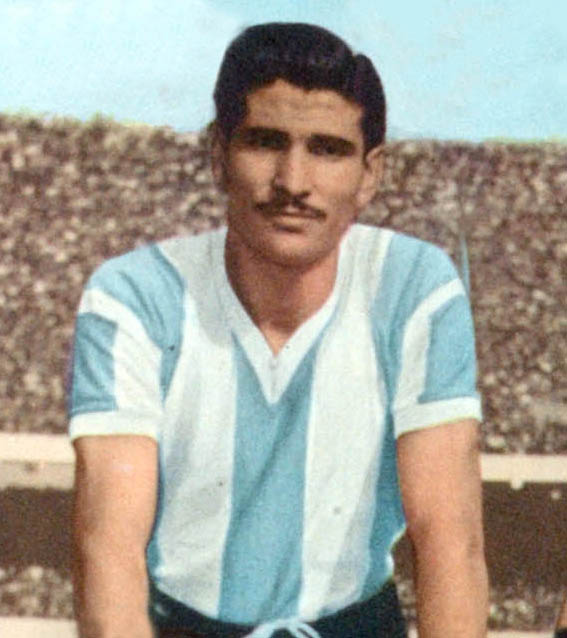
- Micheli with Argentina in 1953

Personal information
- Full name: Rodolfo Joaquin Micheli
- Date of birth: 24 April 1930
- Place of birth: Munro, Argentina
- Date of death: 27 December 2022 (aged 92)
- Position: Striker

Youth career
- 1939–1943: Honor y Patria
- 1943–1944: San José de Florida
- 1944–1950: Independiente

Senior career*
Years	Team	Apps	(Gls)
1950–1952	Argentino de Quilmes		
1952–1957	Independiente	147	(52)
1958	River Plate	2	(0)
1959	Huracán	14	(3)
1960	Millonarios	37	(15)
1961	Platense		

International career
1953–1956	Argentina	13	(10)
- * Club domestic league appearances and goals

Rodolfo Joaquin Micheli (24 April 1930 – 27 December 2022) was an Argentine footballer who played as a striker. He was the topscorer of the 1955 South American Championship.

== Club career ==
Micheli started his professional playing career with Argentino de Quilmes in 1950. He returned to Independiente in 1952, where he played 147 games for the club scoring 52 goals. In 1958 he joined River Plate but only played 2 games for the club before moving on to Club Atlético Huracán in 1959.

Micheli joined Colombian side Millonarios in 1960, but he soon returned to Argentina where he played for Club Atlético Platense. In 1964 as player and Manager of Colegiales and in 1965 he joined Juventud Unida de San Miguel.

== International career ==
Micheli played for Argentina 13 times between 1953 and 1956 scoring 10 goals. 8 of his goals came in the Copa América 1955, where he was the top-scorer, helping Argentina to win the championship.

== Managerial career ==
Micheli had been working as the coach of the Club Atlético Los Andes ladies team.

== Personal life and death ==
Micheli died on 28 December 2022, at the age of 92.

== Honours ==
Argentina

- Copa América: 1955
