= Víctor Salas (footballer, born 1935) =

Peruvian footballer (1935–2021)

Personal information
- Full name: Víctor Salas Escobar
- Date of birth: 29 March 1935
- Place of birth: Lima, Peru
- Date of death: 3 April 2021 (aged 86)
- Height: 1.68 m (5 ft 6 in)
- Position: Defender

Youth career
- Universitario

Senior career*
Years	Team	Apps	(Gls)
1950–1965	Universitario		

International career
1954	Peru U-20		
1955–1957	Peru	17	(0)
- * Club domestic league appearances and goals

Víctor Salas Escobar (29 March 1935 – 3 April 2021) was a Peruvian professional footballer who played as defender.

== Playing career ==
=== Club career ===
Nicknamed Monín, Víctor Salas played his entire career for Universitario de Deportes of Lima. He was crowned Peruvian champion twice, in 1959 and 1960.

=== International career ===
Salas played in the first South American Youth Football Championship in 1954 in Venezuela, under the guidance of Raúl Chappell.

The following year, he was called up to the Peruvian national team and earned 17 caps (without scoring) between 1955 and 1957. He notably participated in three South American Championships in 1955, 1956, and 1957.

== Honours ==
Universitario de Deportes

- Peruvian Primera División (2): 1959, 1960
