= Félix Castillo =

Peruvian footballer (1928–1978)

Personal information
- Full name: Félix Castillo Tardío
- Date of birth: 21 February 1928
- Place of birth: Chincha Alta, Peru
- Date of death: 12 October 1978 (aged 50)
- Place of death: Lima, Peru

Senior career*
Years	Team	Apps	(Gls)
1945–1949	Alianza Lima		
1950–1951	América de Cali		
1952–1960	Alianza Lima		

International career
1947–1956	Peru	31	(7)
- * Club domestic league appearances and goals

Felix Castillo Tardío (21 February 1928 – 12 October 1978) was a former Peruvian football right-wing who played for Alianza Lima and the Peru national football team between 1947 and 1956.

== Playing career ==
At club level, he played for Alianza Lima in Peru, where he was part of three league championship winning campaigns (1948, 1952, 1954 & 1955). He also played for América de Cali of Colombia (1950–1951).

== National team ==
Castillo played for the Peru national team, making 31 appearances and scoring 7 goals.

- South American Championship 1947: 7 matches, 1 goal
- South American Championship 1949: 7 matches, 4 goals
- South American Championship 1955: 5 matches, 1 goal
- South American Championship 1956: 5 matches, 1 goal

=== International goals ===
Scores and results table. Peru's goal tally first:

List of international goals scored by Félix Castillo
No.	Date	Venue	Opponent	Score	Result	Competition
1.	06.12.47	Estadio George Capwell, Guayaquil, Ecuador	Paraguay	1–0	2–2	1947 South American Championship
2.	10.04.49	São Januário, Rio de Janeiro, Brazil	Colombia	3–0	4–0	1949 South American Championship
3.	20.04.49	São Januário, Rio de Janeiro, Brazil	Ecuador	3–0	4–0	1949 South American Championship
4.	30.04.49	Estádio do Pacaembu, São Paulo, Brazil	Chile	2–0	3–0	1949 South American Championship
5.	04.05.49	Estádio General Severiano, Rio de Janeiro, Brazil	Uruguay	2–0	4–3	1949 South American Championship
6.	06.03.55	Estadio Nacional, Santiago, Chile	Chile	1–2	4–5	1955 South American Championship
7.	09.02.56	Estadio Centenario, Montevideo, Uruguay	Chile	1–1	3–4	1956 South American Championship

== Honors ==
Season	Club	Title
1948	Alianza Lima	Peruvian League
1952	Alianza Lima	Peruvian League
1954	Alianza Lima	Peruvian League
1955	Alianza Lima	Peruvian League
