= José Borello =

Argentine footballer

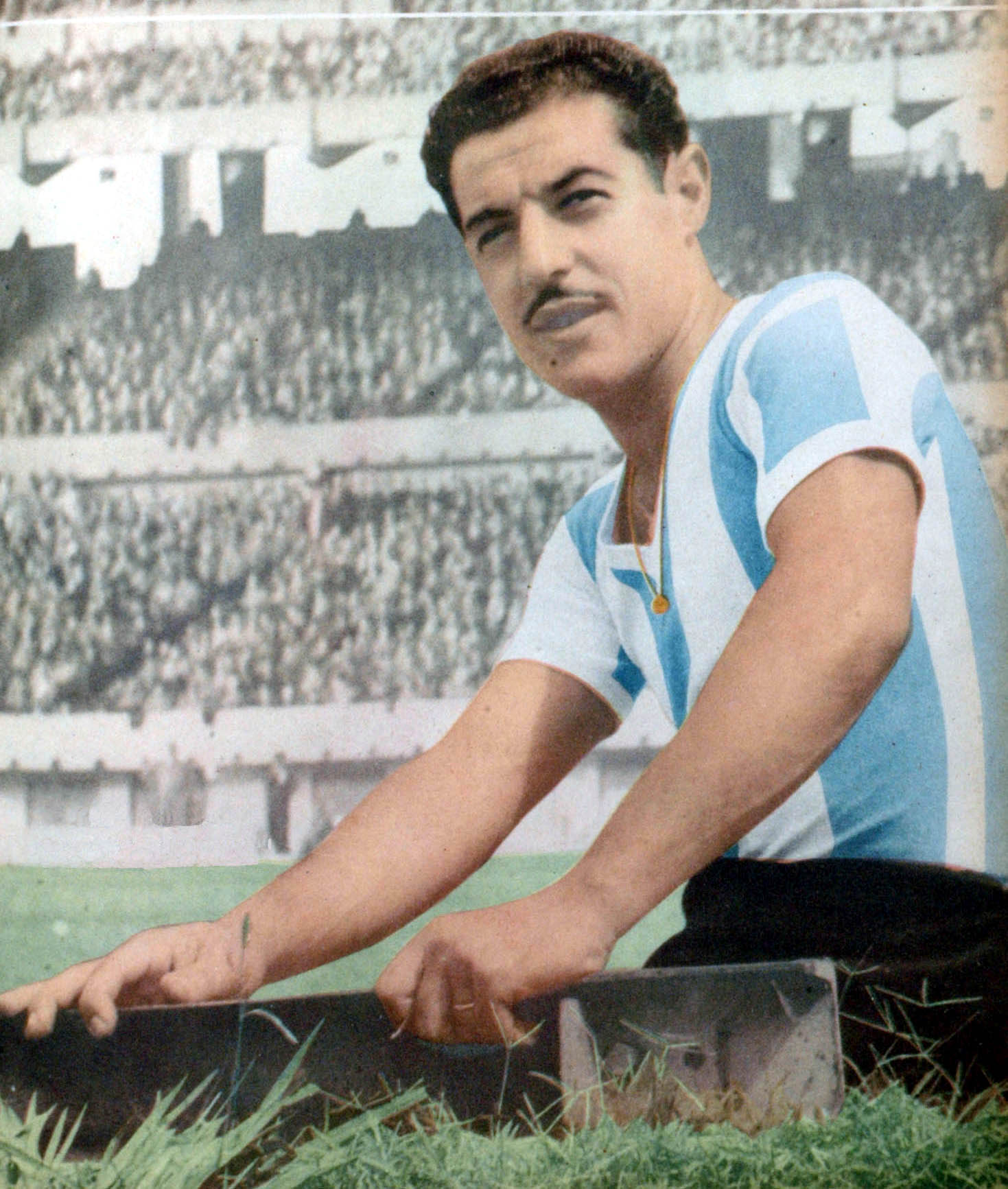
- Borello in 1955

Personal information
- Date of birth: 24 November 1929
- Place of birth: Bahía Blanca, Argentina
- Date of death: 14 October 2013 (aged 83)
- Position: Forward

Senior career*
Years	Team	Apps	(Gls)
1944–1948	Olimpo Bahía Blanca		
1949	Estudiantes (LP)		
1950	Platense		
1951–1952	Boca Juniors		
1953	Chacarita Juniors		
1954–1958	Boca Juniors		
1959	Lanús		
1960	Magallanes		
1961	Ñublense		
1962–1963	Universidad Técnica del Estado		

International career
1954–1955	Argentina	7	(3)
- * Club domestic league appearances and goals

José Borello (24 November 1929 – 14 October 2013) was an Argentine footballer who played as a forward for a number of clubs in Argentina and Chile. He also represented the Argentina national team in 1954 and 1955.

== Honours ==
- Argentine Primera División top scorer: 1954
