= 1955 South American Championship =

Football tournament

Tournament details
- Host country: Chile
- Dates: 27 February – 30 March
- Teams: 6 (from 1 confederation)
- Venue: 1 (in 1 host city)

Final positions
- Champions: Argentina (10th title)
- Runners-up: Chile
- Third place: Peru
- Fourth place: Uruguay

Tournament statistics
- Matches played: 15
- Goals scored: 73 (4.87 per match)
- Top scorer(s): (Argentina) Rodolfo Micheli (8 goals)

The South American Championship 1955 was a football tournament held in Chile and won by Argentina with Chile as runners-up. Brazil, Bolivia, and Colombia withdrew from the tournament. Rodolfo Micheli from Argentina became top scorer of the tournament with 8 goals.

== Venues ==
Santiago
Estadio Nacional de Chile
Capacity: 70,000
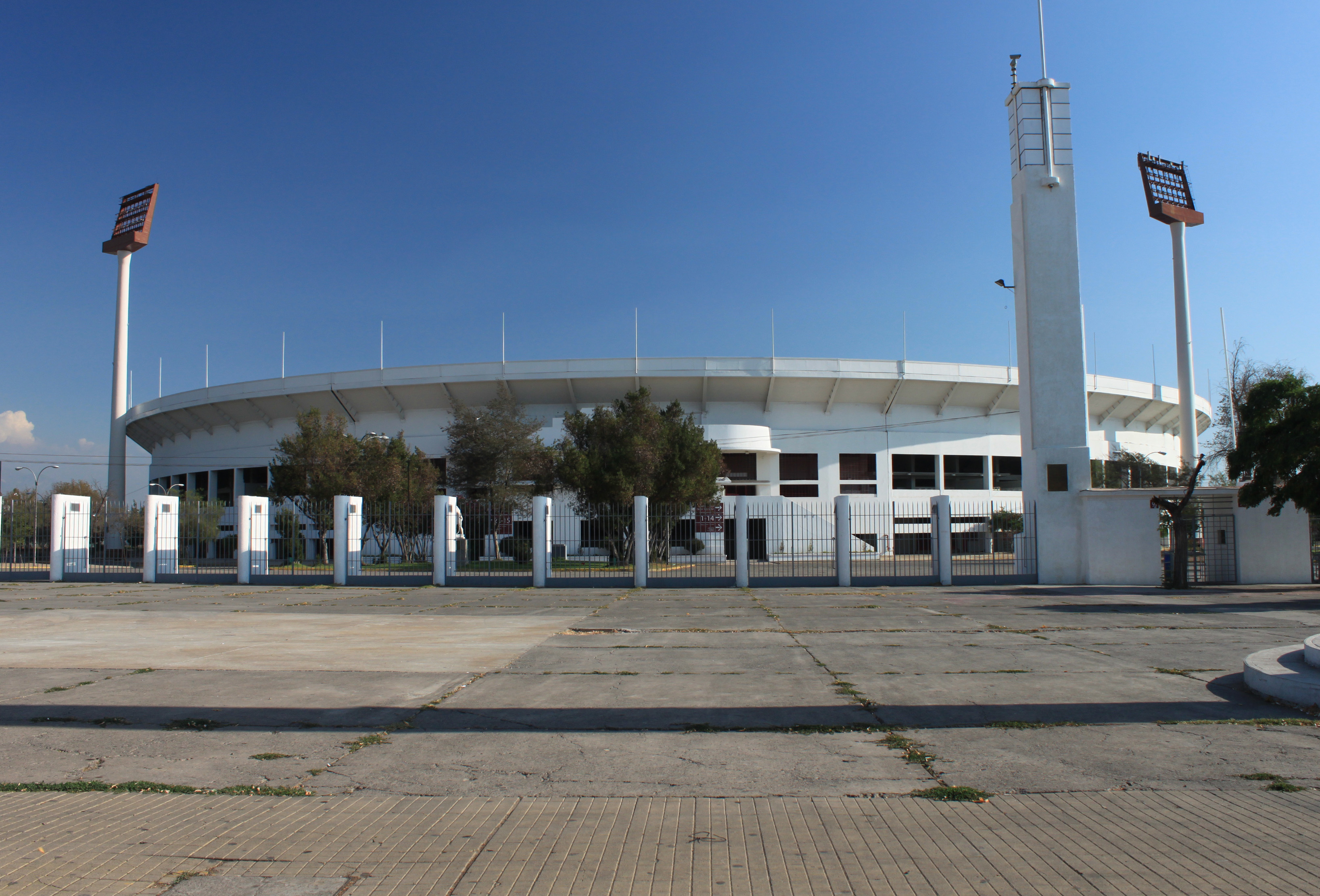

== Final round ==
Team	Pld	W	D	L	GF	GA	GD	Pts
Argentina	5	4	1	0	18	6	+12	9
Chile	5	3	1	1	19	8	+11	7
Peru	5	2	2	1	13	11	+2	6
Uruguay	5	2	1	2	12	12	0	5
Paraguay	5	1	1	3	7	14	−7	3
Ecuador	5	0	0	5	4	22	−18	0

27 February 1955

Chile	7–1	Ecuador
Hormazábal 27', 47', 53'; Díaz 31', 35'; Meléndez 33'; Robledo 55'		Villacreses 64'

Estadio Nacional, Santiago
Attendance: 40,000
Referee: Washington Rodríguez (Uruguay)

2 March 1955

Argentina	5–3	Paraguay
Micheli 5', 18' (pen.), 64', 83'; Borello 74'		Rolón 13'; Martínez 47'; Villalba 89'

Estadio Nacional, Santiago
Attendance: 35,000
Referee: Carlos Robles (Chile)

6 March 1955

Chile	5–4	Peru
Muñoz 9'; Robledo 13', 57'; Hormazábal 52'; Ramírez 84'		Castillo 35'; Barbadillo 62'; Heredia 63' (pen.); Gómez 83'

Estadio Nacional, Santiago
Attendance: 50,000
Referee: Harry Dykes (England)

9 March 1955

Uruguay	3–1	Paraguay
Borges 2'; Abbadie 5'; Míguez 86' (pen.)		Rolón 23'

Estadio Nacional, Santiago
Attendance: 48,000
Referee: Juan Regis Brozzi (Argentina)

9 March 1955

Argentina	4–0	Ecuador
Bonelli 11'; Grillo 24'; Micheli 28'; Borello 71'

Estadio Nacional, Santiago
Attendance: 40,000
Referee: Carlos Robles (Chile)

13 March 1955

Peru	4–2	Ecuador
Gómez 11', 15'; Gonzabay 29' (o.g.), 88' (o.g.)		Matute 34', 61'

Estadio Nacional, Santiago
Attendance: 50,000
Referee: Carlos Robles (Chile)

13 March 1955

Chile	2–2	Uruguay
Muñoz 30'; Hormazábal 72'		Galván 24', 41'

Estadio Nacional, Santiago
Attendance: 50,000
Referee: Juan Regis Brozzi (Argentina)

16 March 1955

Paraguay	2–0	Ecuador
Rolón 16', 32' (pen.)

Estadio Nacional, Santiago
Attendance: 35,000
Referee: Carlos Robles (Chile)

16 March 1955

Argentina	2–2	Peru
Grillo 7'; Cecconato 41'		Gómez 23', 57'

Estadio Nacional, Santiago
Attendance: 23,000
Referee: Washington Rodríguez (Uruguay)

20 March 1955

Chile	5–0	Paraguay
Meléndez 10', 52'; Muñoz 77', 79'; Hormazábal 82'

Estadio Nacional, Santiago
Attendance: 55,000
Referee: Washington Rodríguez (Uruguay)

23 March 1955

Peru	1–1	Paraguay
Terry 33'		Rolón 65'

Estadio Nacional, Santiago
Attendance: 25,000
Referee: Juan Regis Brozzi (Argentina)

23 March 1955

Uruguay	5–1	Ecuador
Galván 4'; Míguez 12'; Abbadie 26', 80'; Pérez 54'		Matute 36'

Estadio Nacional, Santiago
Attendance: 25,000
Referee: Roberto González (Paraguay)

27 March 1955

Argentina	6–1	Uruguay
Micheli 37', 61'; Labruna 39', 71', 87'; Borello 76'		Míguez 32'

Estadio Nacional, Santiago
Attendance: 35,000
Referee: Carlos Robles (Chile)

30 March 1955

Peru	2–1	Uruguay
Castillo 11'; Gómez 68'		Morel 72'

Estadio Nacional, Santiago
Attendance: 65,000
Referee: Carlos Robles (Chile)

30 March 1955

Argentina	1–0	Chile
Micheli 59'

Estadio Nacional, Santiago
Attendance: 65,000
Referee: Washington Rodríguez (Uruguay)

== Result ==
1955 South American Championship champions

Argentina
10th title

== Goal scorers ==
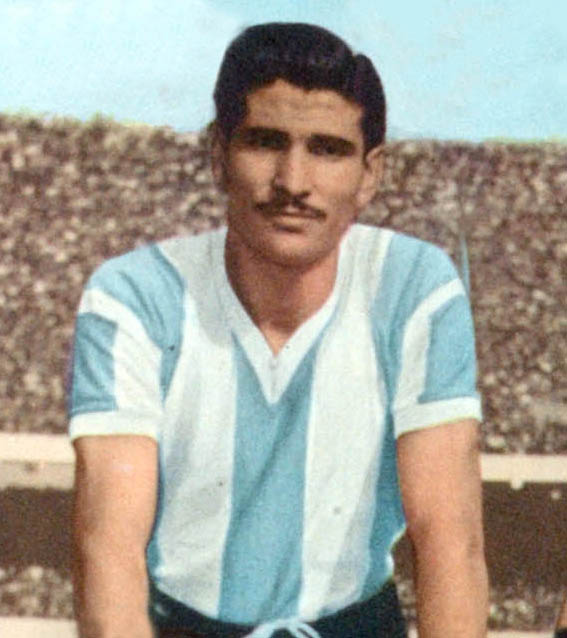
Rodolfo Micheli, top scorer

8 Goals

- (Argentina) Rodolfo Micheli

6 Goals

- (Chile) Enrique Hormazabal
- (Peru) Gómez Sánchez

5 Goals

- (Paraguay) Maximo Rolón

4 Goals

- (Chile) Manuel Muñoz

3 Goals

- (Argentina) José Borello
- (Argentina) Ángel Labruna
- (Chile) Jorge Robledo
- (Chile) René Meléndez
- (Ecuador) Isidro Matute
- (Uruguay) Julio Abbadie
- (Uruguay) Américo Galván
- (Uruguay) Óscar Míguez

2 Goals

- (Argentina) Ernesto Grillo
- (Chile) Díaz Zambrano

1 Goal

- (Argentina) Ricardo Bonelli
- (Argentina) Carlos Cecconato
- (Chile) Ramírez Banda
- (Ecuador) Washington Villacreses
- (Paraguay) Eulogio Martínez
- (Paraguay) Salvador Villalba
- (Peru) Guillermo Barbadillo
- (Peru) Félix Castillo
- (Peru) Cornelio Heredia
- (Peru) Roberto Castillo
- (Peru) Alberto Terry
- (Uruguay) Carlos Borges
- (Uruguay) Julio Pérez
- (Uruguay) Walter Morel

2 Own Goals

- (Ecuador) Honorato Gonzabay (for Peru)
