= Carlos Cecconato =

Argentine footballer (1930–2018)

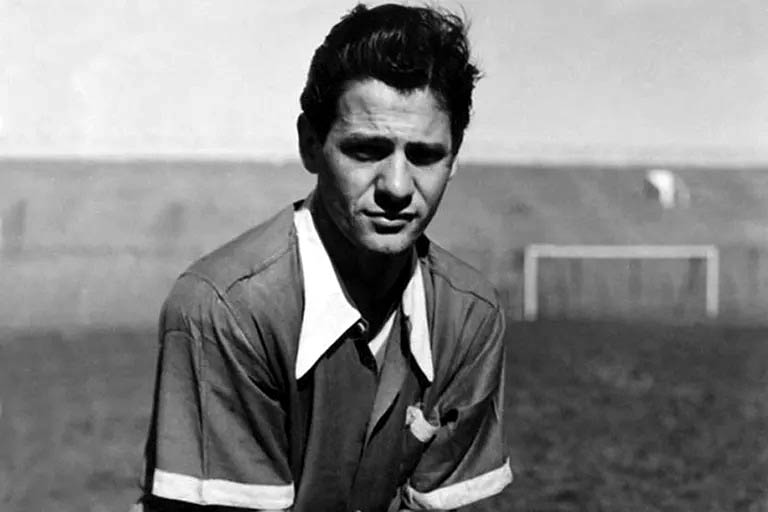

Personal information
- Date of birth: 27 January 1930
- Place of birth: Avellaneda, Argentina
- Date of death: 12 December 2018 (aged 88)
- Height: 1.75 m (5 ft 9 in)
- Position: Midfielder

Senior career*
Years	Team	Apps	(Gls)
1946	El Porvenir		
1947–1957	Independiente	148	(52)
- Atlético Palmira
Total		148	(52)

International career
1953–1956	Argentina	11	(2)
- * Club domestic league appearances and goals

Carlos Cecconato (27 January 1930 – 12 December 2018) was an Argentine footballer who played as a midfielder.

Born in Avellaneda, Cecconato played for El Porvenir, Independiente and Atlético Palmira. He scored 52 goals in 148 league appearances for Independiente. Ceccanato was a skilled attacking player, part of Independiente's Quinteto de Oro (Golden Quintet) until 1957 when he was sanctioned for two years by the AFA following a contract dispute with the club.

Cecconato also earned 11 caps for the Argentine national side between 1953 and 1956, scoring two goals.

Cecconato died on 12 December 2018, aged 88.
