= 1956 South American Championship =

Football tournament

Tournament details
- Host country: Uruguay
- Dates: 21 January – 15 February
- Teams: 6 (from 1 confederation)
- Venue: 1 (in 1 host city)

Final positions
- Champions: Uruguay (9th title)
- Runners-up: Chile
- Third place: Argentina
- Fourth place: Brazil

Tournament statistics
- Matches played: 15
- Goals scored: 38 (2.53 per match)
- Attendance: 568,000 (37,867 per match)
- Top scorer(s): (Chile) Enrique Hormazábal (4 goals)

South American Championship 1956 was a football tournament held in Uruguay, who won it. Chile were runners-up. Bolivia, Colombia, and Ecuador withdrew from the tournament. Enrique Hormazábal from Chile became top scorer of the tournament with 4 goals.

== Venues ==
Montevideo
Estadio Centenario
Capacity: 65,235
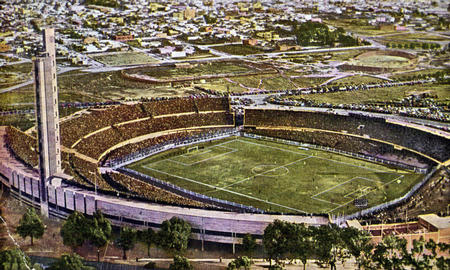

== Final round ==
Team	Pld	W	D	L	GF	GA	GD	Pts
Uruguay	5	4	1	0	9	3	+6	9
Chile	5	3	0	2	11	8	+3	6
Argentina	5	3	0	2	5	3	+2	6
Brazil	5	2	2	1	4	5	−1	6
Paraguay	5	0	2	3	3	8	−5	2
Peru	5	0	1	4	6	11	−5	1

21 January 1956

Uruguay	4–2	Paraguay
Míguez 12'; Escalada 25', 32'; Roque 65'		Rolón 81'; Gómez 89'

Estadio Centenario, Montevideo
Attendance: 55,000
Referee: Juan Regis Brozzi (Argentina)

22 January 1956

Argentina	2–1	Peru
Sívori 43'; Vairo 51'		Drago 56'

Estadio Centenario, Montevideo
Attendance: 16,000
Referee: Washington Rodríguez (Uruguay)

24 January 1956

Chile	4–1	Brazil
Hormazábal 8', 83'; Meléndez 65'; Sánchez 71'		Maurinho 38'

Estadio Centenario, Montevideo
Attendance: 18,000
Referee: Juan Regis Brozzi (Argentina)

28 January 1956

Uruguay	2–0	Peru
Escalada 42'; Míguez 73'

Estadio Centenario, Montevideo
Attendance: 70,000
Referee: Cayetano de Nicola (Paraguay)

29 January 1956

Brazil	0–0	Paraguay

Estadio Centenario, Montevideo
Attendance: 45,000
Referee: Sergio Bustamante (Chile)

29 January 1956

Argentina	2–0	Chile
Labruna 9', 79'

Estadio Centenario, Montevideo
Attendance: 45,000
Referee: João Baptista Laurito (Brazil)

1 February 1956

Brazil	2–1	Peru
Álvaro 10'; Zezinho 80'		Drago 42'

Estadio Centenario, Montevideo
Attendance: 20,000
Referee: Washington Rodríguez (Uruguay)

1 February 1956

Argentina	1–0	Paraguay
Cecconato 54'

Estadio Centenario, Montevideo
Attendance: 20,000
Referee: João Baptista Laurito (Brazil)

5 February 1956

Paraguay	1–1	Peru
Rolón 76'		Andrade 61'

Estadio Centenario, Montevideo
Attendance: 25,000
Referee: Juan Regis Brozzi (Argentina)

5 February 1956

Brazil	1–0	Argentina
Luizinho 88'

Estadio Centenario, Montevideo
Attendance: 25,000
Referee: Washington Rodríguez (Uruguay)

6 February 1956

Uruguay	2–1	Chile
Míguez 12'; Borges 58'		Ramírez Banda 59'

Estadio Centenario, Montevideo
Attendance: 60,000
Referee: Juan Regis Brozzi (Argentina)

9 February 1956

Chile	4–3	Peru
Hormazábal 15'; Muñoz 34'; Fernández 70'; Sánchez 86'		Castillo 22'; Mosquera 57'; Gómez Sánchez 80'

Estadio Centenario, Montevideo
Attendance: 5,000
Referee: Juan Regis Brozzi (Argentina)

10 February 1956

Uruguay	0–0	Brazil

Estadio Centenario, Montevideo
Attendance: 80,000
Referee: Juan Regis Brozzi (Argentina)

12 February 1956

Chile	2–0	Paraguay
Hormazábal 41'; Ramírez Banda 51'

Estadio Centenario, Montevideo
Attendance: 4,000
Referee: Washington Rodríguez (Uruguay)

15 February 1956

Uruguay	1–0	Argentina
Ambrois 23'

Estadio Centenario, Montevideo
Attendance: 80,000
Referee: Cayetano de Nicola (Paraguay)

== Result ==
1956 South American Championship champions

Uruguay
9th title

== Goalscorers ==
A total of 26 different players scored 38 goals in the tournament. None of the goals are credited as own goal.

4 Goals

- (Chile) Enrique Hormazábal

3 Goals

- (Uruguay) Guillermo Escalada
- (Uruguay) Óscar Míguez

2 Goals

- (Argentina) Ángel Labruna
- (Chile) Jaime Ramírez Banda
- (Chile) Leonel Sánchez
- (Paraguay) Máximo Rolón
- (Peru) Roberto Drago

1 Goal

- (Argentina) Carlos Cecconato
- (Argentina) Omar Sívori
- (Argentina) Federico Vairo
- (Brazil) Álvaro
- (Brazil) Luizinho
- (Brazil) Maurinho
- (Brazil) Zezinho
- (Chile) José Fernández
- (Chile) Manuel Muñoz
- (Chile) René Meléndez
- (Paraguay) Antonio Gómez
- (Peru) Isaac Andrade
- (Peru) Félix Castillo
- (Peru) Gómez Sánchez
- (Peru) Máximo Mosquera
- (Uruguay) Javier Ambrois
- (Uruguay) Carlos Borges
- (Uruguay) José Walter Roque
