= Football at the 1935 Central American and Caribbean Games – Men's team squads =

The following is a list of squads for each nation competing in football at the 1935 Central American and Caribbean Games in San Salvador.

== Costa Rica ==
Head coach: (El Salvador) (Costa Rica) (Spain) Ricardo Saprissa

No.	Pos.	Player	Date of birth (age)	Caps	Goals	Club
—	GK	Ricardo González Camacho	2 August 1906 (aged 28)	0	0	(Costa Rican Football Federation) Gimnástica Española
—	GK	Mario Jones	4 August 1914 (aged 20)	0	0	(Costa Rican Football Federation) La Libertad
—	DF	Ricardo Barquero		0	0	
—	DF	Manuel Guerrero		0	0	
—	DF	Eduardo Goldoni		0	0	(Costa Rican Football Federation) La Libertad
—	DF	Félix Montero		0	0	
—	MF	Santiago Bonilla	1 March 1910 (aged 25)	0	0	(Costa Rican Football Federation) Herediano
—	MF	Jesús Rojas	23 January 1903 (aged 32)	0	0	(Costa Rican Football Federation) Gimnástica Española
—	MF	Numa Ruiz		0	0	(Costa Rican Football Federation) Alajuela Junior
—	MF	Abel Sandoval		0	0	(Costa Rican Football Federation) Herediano
—	MF	Carlos Villalobos		0	0	(Costa Rican Football Federation) La Libertad
—	FW	Emmanuel Amador	3 October 1914 (aged 20)	0	0	(Costa Rican Football Federation) La Libertad
—	FW	Jorge Dávila		0	0	(Costa Rican Football Federation) La Libertad
—	FW	Wálter Evans		0	0	(Costa Rican Football Federation) Cartaginés
—	FW	Jorge Fernández		0	0	
—	FW	José Hütt	18 January 1910 (aged 25)	0	0	(Costa Rican Football Federation) Orión
—	FW	Rodolfo Muñoz	18 October 1912 (aged 22)	0	0	(Costa Rican Football Federation) La Libertad
—	FW	Mario Sáenz		0	0	
—	FW	Salvador Soto	4 November 1909 (aged 25)	0	0	(Costa Rican Football Federation) Alajuelense
—	FW	Aníbal Varela	31 December 1912 (aged 22)	0	0	(Costa Rican Football Federation) Herediano
—	FW	José Verdesia		0	0	(Costa Rican Football Federation) La Libertad

== Cuba ==
Head coach: (Hungary) Károly Katzer

No.	Pos.	Player	Date of birth (age)	Caps	Goals	Club
—	GK	Bonifacio Campos		0	0	
—	GK	Luis Miguel López		0	0	
—	DF	Jacinto Barquín	3 September 1915 (aged 19)	0	0	(Football Association of Cuba) Puentes Grandes
—	DF	Gabriel Becerra		0	0	
—	DF	Juan Vila		0	0	
—	MF	José Olmedo		0	0	
—	MF	Wilfredo Ortega		0	0	
—	MF	Marcelino Quiriello				
—	MF	Andrés Rodríguez		1	0	
—	MF	José Rodríguez		0	0	(Football Association of Cuba) CD Centro Gallego
—	FW	Pedro Ferrer	1908 (aged 27)	0	0	(Football Association of Cuba) Iberia Havana
—	FW	Antonio Flores		0	0	
—	FW	José Magriñá	14 December 1917 (aged 17)	0	0	(Football Association of Cuba) Centro Gallego
—	FW	Miguel Requejo		0	0	
—	FW	Rolando Rosillo		2	0	
—	FW	Mario Sosa	1910 (aged 25)	0	0	(Football Association of Cuba) Iberia Havana

== El Salvador ==
Head coach: (Spain) Pablo Ferre Elías

No.	Pos.	Player	Date of birth (age)	Caps	Goals	Club
—	GK	Miguel Guardado		0	0	(Salvadoran Football Federation) Arsenal
—	GK	Edmundo Majano		0	0	(Salvadoran Football Federation) Hercules
—	DF	Enrique Benítez		0	0	(Salvadoran Football Federation) Alacranes
—	DF	Raúl Castro		0	0	(Salvadoran Football Federation) Alacranes
—	DF	Tobías Rivera		0	0	(Salvadoran Football Federation) C.D. Maya
—	MF	Samuel Astacio		0	0	(Salvadoran Football Federation) C.D. Maya
—	MF	Napoleón Cañas		0	0	(Salvadoran Football Federation) C.D. Maya
—	MF	Armando Chacón	7 August 1914 (aged 20)	0	0	(Salvadoran Football Federation) Club Deportivo 33
—	MF	Américo González		0	0	(Salvadoran Football Federation) Arsenal
—	MF	Julio Valencia		0	0	(Salvadoran Football Federation) Alacranes
—	FW	Rogelio Avilés		0	0	(Salvadoran Football Federation) Arsenal
—	FW	Miguel Cruz	1911 (aged 24)	0	0	(Salvadoran Football Federation) Libertad
—	FW	Andrés Hernández		0	0	(Salvadoran Football Federation) Hercules
—	FW	José Alejandro Morales		0	0	(Salvadoran Football Federation) Excélsior F.C.
—	FW	Fidel Quintanilla		0	0	(Salvadoran Football Federation) Alacranes
—		Gustavo Aguirre		0	0	(Salvadoran Football Federation) Excélsior F.C.
—		Mario Fuentes		0	0	(Salvadoran Football Federation) Alacranes
—		Emilio Guardado		0	0	(Salvadoran Football Federation) Arsenal
—		José Munguía		0	0	(Salvadoran Football Federation) Universitario
—		Luis Rivera		0	0	
—		Martín Sanglas		0	0	(Salvadoran Football Federation) Hercules
—		Edmundo Tinettí		0	0	(Salvadoran Football Federation) C.D. Maya

== Guatemala ==
Head coach: (England) Jimmy Elliott

No.	Pos.	Player	Date of birth (age)	Caps	Goals	Club
—	GK	Francisco Cosenza		0	0	
—	GK	Günther Edelman		0	0	(National Football Federation of Guatemala) Politécnica
—	DF	Víctor Morales		0	0	
—	DF	Luis Urrutria		0	0	
—	MF	Alfonso Duarte		0	0	
—	MF	Braulio Laguardia		0	0	(National Football Federation of Guatemala) Tipografía Nacional
—	MF	José María Magaña		0	0	
—	MF	Max Molina		0	0	
—	MF	Tránsito Morales		0	0	
—	MF	Julio César Páiz		0	0	
—	FW	T. Flores		0	0	
—	FW	Romeo Guevara		0	0	
—	FW	Salvador Hernández		0	0	
—	FW	Salvador Juárez		0	0	(National Football Federation of Guatemala) Quetzal
—	FW	Arturo Mendizábal		0	0	
—	FW	Leocadio Petz		0	0	(National Football Federation of Guatemala) Quetzal
—	FW	Max Ramazzini		0	0	(National Football Federation of Guatemala) Cibeles
—	FW	Luis Alberto Ruano		0	0	
—	FW	Miguel Ángel Ruano		0	0	(National Football Federation of Guatemala) Tipografía Nacional
—	FW	Felipe Saravia		0	0	

== Honduras ==
Head coach: (Honduras) Jacobo de Fuenquinos

No.	Pos.	Player	Date of birth (age)	Caps	Goals	Club
—	GK	Dailos Taylor		0	0	(National Autonomous Federation of Football of Honduras) Real C.D. España
—	DF	José Haifield				
—	DF	Rafael Argeñal		1	0	
—	DF	Mario Castro		0	0	
—	MF	Tomás Casco				
—	MF	Manuel Zúñiga		1	0	(National Autonomous Federation of Football of Honduras) F.C. Motagua
—	FW	José Castro		0	0	
—	FW	José Cruz		0	0	
—	FW	Luis Alfonso				
—	FW	Alfonso Castro		0	0	
—	FW	Felipe Puerto		0	0	
—	MF	Arístides Raudales		2	0	(National Autonomous Federation of Football of Honduras) F.C. Motagua
—	MF	Máximo Cárcamo		0	0	(National Autonomous Federation of Football of Honduras) C.D. Olimpia
—	FW	Pedro López		0	0	
—	FW	Jorge Medrano		0	0	
—	FW	Marciano Montoya		0	0	
—	FW	Juan Navarro		0	0	(National Autonomous Federation of Football of Honduras) Real C.D. España

== Mexico ==
Head coach: (England) Alfred C. Crowle

No.	Pos.	Player	Date of birth (age)	Caps	Goals	Club
—	GK	Raúl Estrada	1910 (aged 25)	0	0	(Mexican Football Federation) Necaxa
—	GK	Alfonso Riestra		3	0	(Mexican Football Federation) Asturias
—	DF	Antonio Azpiri	1912 (aged 23)	3	0	(Mexican Football Federation) Necaxa
—	DF	Lorenzo Camarena	12 October 1901 (aged 33)	3	0	(Mexican Football Federation) Necaxa
—	DF	Armando Frank		0	0	(Mexican Football Federation) América
—	DF	Guillermo Ortega		3	0	(Mexican Football Federation) Necaxa
—	DF	Miguel Pizano		0	0	(Mexican Football Federation) Necaxa
—	MF	Ignacio Ávila	1910 (aged 25)	3	0	(Mexican Football Federation) Necaxa
—	MF	Marcial Ortiz	1910 (aged 25)	0	0	(Mexican Football Federation) Necaxa
—	MF	Felipe Rosas	5 February 1910 (aged 25)	6	1	(Mexican Football Federation) Atlante
—	FW	Luis García Cortina		0	0	(Mexican Football Federation) Real Club España
—	FW	Vicente García		2	0	(Mexican Football Federation) Necaxa
—	FW	Hilario López	18 November 1907 (aged 27)	3	0	(Mexican Football Federation) Necaxa
—	FW	Julio Lores	15 September 1908 (aged 26)	0	0	(Mexican Football Federation) Necaxa
—	FW	Tomás Lozano	30 August 1912 (aged 22)	0	0	(Mexican Football Federation) Necaxa
—	FW	Luis Pérez	1907 (aged 28)	2	0	(Mexican Football Federation) Necaxa
