= Football at the 1938 Central American and Caribbean Games – Men's team squads =

The following is a list of squads for each nation competing in football at the 1938 Central American and Caribbean Games in Panama City.

== Colombia ==
Head coach: (Colombia) Alfonso Novoa

No.	Pos.	Player	Date of birth (age)	Caps	Goals	Club
—	GK	José Escorcia		0	0	(Colombian Football Federation) Junior
—	DF	Pablo Lara		0	0	(Colombian Football Federation) Juventud Bogotana
—	DF	Severiano Lugo		0	0	(Colombian Football Federation) Juventud Bogotana
—	DF	Antenor Rodríguez		0	0	(Colombian Football Federation) Juventud Bogotana
—	MF	Guillermo Herrera		0	0	(Colombian Football Federation) Juventud Bogotana
—	MF	Isidro Joliani		0	0	(Colombian Football Federation) Junior
—	MF	Pedro Yépez		0	0	(Colombian Football Federation) Juventud Bogotana
—	FW	Marcos Mejía		0	0	(Colombian Football Federation) Junior
—	FW	Rafael Mejía		0	0	(Colombian Football Federation) Independiente Santa Marta
—	FW	Roberto Meléndez	31 March 1912 (aged 25)	0	0	(Colombian Football Federation) Junior
—	FW	Antonio Pastor		0	0	(Colombian Football Federation) Juventud Bogotana
—	FW	Julio Torres		0	0	(Colombian Football Federation) Junior
—		Carlos Álvarez		0	0	(Colombian Football Federation) Juventud Bogotana
—		Genisberto Cabas		0	0	(Colombian Football Federation) Juventud Bogotana
—		Antonio Díaz		0	0	(Colombian Football Federation) Juventud Bogotana
—		Omar López		0	0	(Colombian Football Federation) Juventud Bogotana
—		Carlos Maestre		0	0	(Colombian Football Federation) Juventud Bogotana
—		Humberto Márquez		0	0	(Colombian Football Federation) Juventud Bogotana
—		Felipe Suárez		0	0	(Colombian Football Federation) Juventud Bogotana

== Costa Rica ==
Head coach: (El Salvador) (Costa Rica) (Spain) Ricardo Saprissa

No.	Pos.	Player	Date of birth (age)	Caps	Goals	Club
—	GK	Mario Jones	4 August 1914 (aged 23)	4	0	(Costa Rican Football Federation) La Libertad
—	GK	Hugo Zúñiga		0	0	
—	DF	Eduardo Goldoni		4	0	(Mexican Football Federation) Real Club España
—	DF	Enrique Lizano		0	0	(Costa Rican Football Federation) Herediano
—	DF	Milton Valverde	26 July 1907 (aged 30)	0	0	(Costa Rican Football Federation) Herediano
—	MF	Santiago Bonilla	1 March 1910 (aged 27)	3	0	(Mexican Football Federation) Marte
—	MF	Guillermo Coto		0	0	
—	MF	Guillermo Elizondo	2 May 1908 (aged 29)	3	0	
—	MF	Guido Matamoros		0	0	(Costa Rican Football Federation) Orión
—	MF	Gregorio Morales		0	0	
—	MF	Jesús Rojas	23 January 1903 (aged 35)	5	0	(Costa Rican Football Federation) Gimnástica Española
—	MF	José Luis Rojas	4 April 1920 (aged 17)	0	0	(Costa Rican Football Federation) Alajuelense
—	MF	Abel Sandoval		2	0	(Costa Rican Football Federation) Herediano
—	FW	Hernán Bolaños	20 March 1912 (aged 25)	4	5	(Football Federation of Chile) Audax Italiano
—	FW	Miguel Bolaños		0	0	(Costa Rican Football Federation) Orión
—	FW	Óscar Bolaños		0	0	(Costa Rican Football Federation) Orión
—	FW	José Hütt	18 January 1910 (aged 28)	3	1	(Costa Rican Football Federation) Asturias
—	FW	Alejandro Morera Soto	14 July 1909 (aged 28)	0	0	(Costa Rican Football Federation) Alajuelense
—	FW	Rodolfo Muñoz	18 October 1912 (aged 25)	2	0	(Mexican Football Federation) Real Club España
—	FW	Alfredo Piedra Mora	16 August 1915 (aged 22)	0	0	(Costa Rican Football Federation) Orión
—	FW	Jorge Quesada	14 July 1909 (aged 28)	0	0	(Costa Rican Football Federation) Alajuelense
—	FW	José Verdesia		2	1	(Costa Rican Football Federation) La Libertad

== El Salvador ==
Head coach: (Spain) Pablo Ferre Elías

No.	Pos.	Player	Date of birth (age)	Caps	Goals	Club
—	GK	Miguel Guardado		3	0	
—	GK	Edmundo Majano		2	0	
—	DF	Armando Arias		0	0	
—	DF	Enrique Benítez		2	0	
—	DF	Raúl Castro		3	0	
—	DF	Noel Cuéllar		1	0	
—	DF	Tobías Rivera		4	0	
—	MF	Samuel Astacio		4	0	
—	MF	Manuel Cano		0	0	
—	MF	Napoleón Cañas		4	0	
—	MF	Armando Chacón	7 August 1914 (aged 23)	3	2	(Salvadoran Football Federation) Club Deportivo 33
—	MF	Armando Colorado		0	0	
—	MF	José Colorado		0	0	
—	MF	Américo González		4	0	
—	FW	Jorge Aquino		0	0	
—	FW	Alejandro Contreras		0	0	
—	FW	Miguel Cruz	1911 (aged 27)	4	6	(Salvadoran Football Federation) Libertad
—	FW	Gustavo Donado		0	0	
—	FW	Francisco Martínez		0	0	
—	FW	Néstor Paz		0	0	
—	FW	Antonio Toledo Valle		0	0	
—	FW	José Luis Torres		0	0	

== Mexico ==
Head coach: (Mexico) Rafael Garza Gutiérrez

No.	Pos.	Player	Date of birth (age)	Caps	Goals	Club
—	GK	Raúl Estrada	1910 (aged 28)	5	0	(Mexican Football Federation) Necaxa
—	GK	Rafael Navarro Corona		2	0	(Mexican Football Federation) Real Club España
—	DF	Pedro Andrade		1	0	(Mexican Football Federation) América
—	DF	Antonio Azpiri	1912 (aged 26)	9	0	(Mexican Football Federation) Necaxa
—	DF	Armando Frank		1	0	(Mexican Football Federation) América
—	DF	Alberto Islas		0	0	(Mexican Football Federation) Atlante
—	DF	Carlos Laviada	16 May 1916 (aged 21)	3	0	(Mexican Football Federation) Asturias
—	DF	Guillermo Ortega		7	0	(Mexican Football Federation) Necaxa
—	DF	Juan Rosas		2	0	(Mexican Football Federation) Atlante
—	MF	Ignacio Ávila	1910 (aged 28)	8	0	(Mexican Football Federation) Necaxa
—	MF	Luis de la Fuente	17 January 1914 (aged 24)	1	0	(Mexican Football Federation) Real Club España
—	MF	Marcial Ortiz	1910 (aged 28)	1	0	(Mexican Football Federation) Necaxa
—	MF	Alfredo Sánchez	1907 (aged 31)	6	0	(Mexican Football Federation) America
—	FW	Luis Argüelles		3	4	(Mexican Football Federation) Asturias
—	FW	Horacio Casarín	25 May 1918 (aged 19)	2	3	(Mexican Football Federation) Necaxa
—	FW	Luis García Cortina		6	5	(Mexican Football Federation) Real Club España
—	FW	Vicente García		6	3	(Mexican Football Federation) Necaxa
—	FW	Antonio López Herranz	4 May 1913 (aged 24)	2	2	(Mexican Football Federation) América
—	FW	Julio Lores	15 September 1908 (aged 29)	6	6	(Mexican Football Federation) Necaxa
—	FW	Luis Pérez	1907 (aged 31)	5	3	(Mexican Football Federation) Necaxa
—	FW	Manuel Alonso Pría		4	8	(Mexican Football Federation) Real Club España

== Panama ==
Head coach: (Uruguay) Romeo Parravicini

No.	Pos.	Player	Date of birth (age)	Caps	Goals	Club
—	GK	Oscar Sogandares		0	0	
—	GK	Ruben Clark		0	0	
—	DF	Miguel Davis		0	0	
—	DF	Emel Ospino		0	0	
—	DF	Carlos Romulton		0	0	
—	MF	Ernesto Pinate		0	0	
—	MF	George Pinnock		0	0	
—	MF	Alfredo Tapia		0	0	
—	FW	José Alzamora		0	0	
—	FW	James Santiago Anderson		0	0	
—	FW	Gerardo Mahoney		0	0	
—	FW	Kenneth McLeary		0	0	
—	FW	Antoine Neville		0	0	
—	FW	Azael Ospino		0	0	
—	FW	Pablo Prado		0	0	
—		Humberto Chera		0	0	

== Venezuela ==
Head coach: (Italy) Vittorio Godigna

No.	Pos.	Player	Date of birth (age)	Caps	Goals	Club
—	GK	José Luis Candiales		0	0	
—	GK	Ezequiel Machado		0	0	
—	DF	Teodardo Marcano		0	0	
—	DF	Ramón Morales		0	0	
—	DF	Francisco Ravard		0	0	
—	MF	José María Ardila		0	0	
—	MF	Nicasio Camero		0	0	
—	MF	Mauricio Corao		0	0	
—	MF	Hernán Mújica		0	0	
—	FW	Alberto Castillo		0	0	
—	FW	Graciano Castillo		0	0	
—	FW	Pablo Corao		0	0	
—	FW	Reinaldo Febres		0	0	
—	FW	Carlos Feo		0	0	
—	FW	Francisco Marcano		0	0	
—	FW	Fernando Ríos		0	0	
—		Leopoldo Márquez		0	0	
—		Félix Ochoa		0	0	
