= El Salvador national football team results (1921–1949) =

Results of the El Salvador national football team

This article provides details of international football games played by the El Salvador national football team from 1921 to 1949.

== 1920s ==
14 September 1921 ICG Semifinals	Costa Rica	7–0	El Salvador	Guatemala City, Guatemala
9:30 UTC−6	Gutiérrez 9'; Arguedas (?); Madrigal (?); Bermúdez (?)			Stadium: Campo de Marte; Attendance: 2,000

7 November 1927 Friendly	Honduras	1–0	El Salvador	Honduras
	? (?)

8 November 1927 Friendly	Honduras	0–0	El Salvador	Honduras

7 December 1928 Friendly	El Salvador	5–0	Honduras	San Salvador, El Salvador
	Marroquín (?)			Stadium: Campo de Marte

1 May 1929 Friendly	El Salvador	9–0	Nicaragua	San Salvador, El Salvador
	Marroquín (?); ? (?)			Stadium: Campo de Marte

== 1930s ==
19 March 1930 1930 CACG Round 1	El Salvador	8–2	Guatemala	Havana, Cuba
	Marroquín 2', 10', 62'; Calvo 13', 35', 40'; Herrera 44'; Tirello 77'	Report	Batres 20', 57'	Stadium: La Tropical; Referee: Jesús Hermo (Cuba)

22 March 1930 1930 CACG Round 1	Costa Rica	9–2	El Salvador	Havana, Cuba
	Bolaños (?); Madrigal (?); Morales (?); Solera (?)	Report	Tirello (?); Marroquín (?)	Stadium: La Tropical; Referee: Pablo Ferre (Spain)

26 March 1930 1930 CACG Round 2	Costa Rica	5–0	El Salvador	Havana, Cuba
	Bolaños 15', 55'; Madrigal 25' (?); Solera (?)	Report		Stadium: La Tropical; Referee: Conrado Morales (Cuba)

29 March 1930 1930 CACG Round 2	El Salvador	1–4	Honduras	Havana, Cuba
	Marroquín (?)	Report	Raudales (?); Navarro (?); Talbott (?)	Stadium: La Tropical; Referee: Jesús Hermo (Cuba)

1 April 1930 1930 CACG Round 2	Cuba	5–2	El Salvador	Havana, Cuba
	Valdés (?); Martínez (?); Rosillo (?)	Report	Calvo (?); Marroquín (?)	Stadium: La Tropical; Referee: Conrado González (Cuba)

24 March 1935 1935 CACG	El Salvador	4–1	Cuba	San Salvador, El Salvador
8:00 UTC−6	Quintanilla 41', 77'; Cruz 72', 75'	Report	Requejo 67'	Stadium: Estadio Nacional; Referee: German Núñez (Mexico)

27 March 1935 1935 CACG	El Salvador	1–8	Mexico	San Salvador, El Salvador
8:00 UTC−6	Cruz 26'	Report	García 23', 70'; Cortina 51'; Lozano 62', 75'; López 73', 80', 86'	Stadium: Estadio Nacional; Attendance: 10,000; Referee: Manuel Rodríguez (Costa Rica)

28 March 1935 1935 CACG	El Salvador	3–4	Honduras	San Salvador, El Salvador
8:00 UTC−6	Cruz 18'; Morales 59'; Chacón 82'	Report	Reyes 10', 50'; Navarro 23'; Medrano 68'	Stadium: Estadio Nacional; Referee: Manuel Rodríguez (Costa Rica)

30 March 1935 1935 CACG	Costa Rica	6–1	El Salvador	San Salvador, El Salvador
16:00 UTC−6	Amador 4', 14', 51'; Hütt 54'; Fernández 68', 88'	Report	Morales 38'	Stadium: Estadio Nacional; Referee: German Núñez (Mexico)

3 April 1935 1935 CACG	El Salvador	6–1	Guatemala	San Salvador, El Salvador
16:00 UTC−6	Quintanilla 44' (?); Chacón (?); Cruz (?); Hernández (?)	Report	Mendizábal 38'	Stadium: Estadio Nacional; Referee: Manuel Rodríguez (Costa Rica)

12 February 1938 1938 CACG	Costa Rica	7–0	El Salvador	Panama City, Panama
	H. Bolaños (?); Hütt (?); Morera (?); Rojas (?)	Report		Stadium: Estadio Olímpico Nacional

16 February 1938 1938 CACG	El Salvador	3–2	Venezuela	Panama City, Panama
	Contreras (?); Cruz (?); F. Martínez (?)	Report	Febres (?); Marcano (?)	Stadium: Estadio Olímpico Nacional

18 February 1938 1938 CACG	Mexico	6–0	El Salvador	Panama City, Panama
	de la Fuente 18'; Argüelles 38'; Cortina 50', 55'; Casarín 61', 66'	Report		Stadium: Estadio Olímpico Nacional; Referee: Rafael Mirabal (Uruguay)

21 February 1938 1938 CACG	Colombia	3–2	El Salvador	Panama City, Panama
	? (?)	Report	Cuéllar (?); F. Martínez (?)	Stadium: Estadio Olímpico Nacional

23 February 1938 1938 CACG	Panama	1–2	El Salvador	Panama City, Panama
	Castro (?)	Report	Contreras (?); F. Martínez (?)	Stadium: Estadio Olímpico Nacional

== 1940s ==
11 May 1941 1941 CCCF Championship	El Salvador	2–2	Curaçao	Panama City, Panama
	Gutiérrez 2'; Contreras 43'		Nahar 70'; Panneflek (?)	Referee: José Tapia (Cuba)

13 May 1941 1941 CCCF Championship	Nicaragua	0–8	El Salvador	Panama City, Panama
			Toledo 6', 8', 24'; Donado 15'; Rosales 43' (?); R. Méndez 53' (?)	Referee: Jacobo Foinquinos (Honduras)

15 May 1941 1941 CCCF Championship	El Salvador	4–3	Panama	Panama City, Panama
	Gutiérrez 20', 24'; Rosales 22', 77'		? (?)	Referee: José Tapia (Cuba)

18 May 1941 1941 CCCF Championship	Costa Rica	3–1	El Salvador	Panama City, Panama
	Araya 39', 80'; Meza 33'		Mendez 37'	Referee: José Tapia (Cuba)

5 December 1943 1943 CCCF Championship	El Salvador	2–2	Guatemala	San Salvador, El Salvador
	Monterrosa 39'; Torres 42'		Toledo 33' (?)

7 December 1943 1943 CCCF Championship	Nicaragua	1–8	El Salvador	San Salvador, El Salvador
	García (?)		Aceituno 5', 88', 89'; Corado 15'; Ruano 28'; Deras 35'; Rivas 49', 65'

9 December 1943 1943 CCCF Championship	El Salvador	4–2	Costa Rica	San Salvador, El Salvador
	Monterrosa 4'; Linares 60'; Cruz 84'; Torres 86'		Zeledón 39'; Hernández 78'

12 December 1943 1943 CCCF Championship	Guatemala	1–2	El Salvador	San Salvador, El Salvador
	Toledo 31'		Cruz 44'; Torres 45'

16 December 1943 1943 CCCF Championship	El Salvador	10–1	Nicaragua	San Salvador, El Salvador
	Aceituno 4'; Rivas 6', 72', 85'; Cruz 12', 28', 40', 68', 74'; Corado 70'		García 3'

19 December 1943 1943 CCCF Championship	Costa Rica	4–2	El Salvador	San Salvador, El Salvador
	Zeledón 26', 66'; Riggioni 72'; Á. Rojas 84'		Corado 11'; Cruz 53'

21 December 1943 1943 CCCF Championship	El Salvador	Canceled	Guatemala	San Salvador, El Salvador

24 February 1946 1946 CCCF Championship	El Salvador	1–3	Guatemala	San José, Costa Rica
	Gutiérrez 43'		de León 18', 32'; Camposeco 79'	Stadium: Estadio Nacional; Referee: Juan López (Mexico)

28 February 1946 1946 CCCF Championship	El Salvador	7–2	Nicaragua	San José, Costa Rica
	Cea 6'; Corado 35', 50', 69', 78'; Rivas 64', 82'		Navarro 9'; Estrada 58'	Stadium: Estadio Nacional

7 March 1946 1946 CCCF Championship	Panama	1–4	El Salvador	San José, Costa Rica
	Figueroa (?)		Gutiérrez 10'; Deras 23'; Ospino 25' (o.g.); Torres (?)	Stadium: Estadio Nacional; Referee: Juan López (Mexico)

9 March 1946 1946 CCCF Championship	Honduras	1–3	El Salvador	San José, Costa Rica
	? (?)		Gutiérrez (?)	Stadium: Estadio Nacional

13 March 1946 1946 CCCF Championship	Costa Rica	4–0	El Salvador	San José, Costa Rica
	Riggioni 39'; Rodríguez 50'; Zeledón 54', 56'			Stadium: Estadio Nacional; Referee: Juan López (Mexico)

29 February 1948 1948 CCCF Championship	Costa Rica	3–1	El Salvador	Guatemala City, Guatemala
	Esquivel 36'; Campos 65'; Solano 75'		Torres 44'	Stadium: Estadio Escolar; Referee: Jaroslav Vlicek (Czechoslovakia)

2 March 1948 1948 CCCF Championship	Guatemala	3–0	El Salvador	Guatemala City, Guatemala
	Galán 18', 48'; Aqueche 72'			Stadium: Estadio Escolar; Referee: Gabriel Nieto (Mexico)

7 March 1948 1948 CCCF Championship	El Salvador	1–2	Panama	Guatemala City, Guatemala
	Corado 89'		Rangel 15', 29'	Stadium: Estadio Escolar

9 March 1948 1948 CCCF Championship	El Salvador	1–0	Curaçao	Guatemala City, Guatemala
	Monterrosa 5'			Stadium: Estadio Escolar; Referee: Gabriel Nieto (Mexico)

11 March 1948 1948 CCCF Championship	El Salvador	2–0	Curaçao	Guatemala City, Guatemala
	Palacios 20'; Ruano 84'			Stadium: Estadio Escolar; Referee: Jaroslav Vlicek (Czechoslovakia)

13 March 1948 1948 CCCF Championship	Guatemala	1–1	El Salvador	Guatemala City, Guatemala
	Marroquín 80'		Monterrosa 24'	Stadium: Estadio Escolar; Referee: Jaroslav Vlicek (Czechoslovakia)

16 March 1948 1948 CCCF Championship	Panama	2–0	El Salvador	Guatemala City, Guatemala
	Frazer 15', 83'			Stadium: Estadio Escolar; Referee: Gabriel Nieto (Mexico)

18 March 1948 1948 CCCF Championship	El Salvador	0–6	Costa Rica	Guatemala City, Guatemala
			Meza 5', 43', 48', 68', 81'; Esquivel 18'	Stadium: Estadio Escolar; Referee: Gabriel Nieto (Mexico)

2 August 1949 Friendly	El Salvador	3–1	Panama	San Salvador, El Salvador
	Gutiérrez (?); ? (?)		? (?)

4 August 1949 Friendly	El Salvador	2–3	Panama	San Salvador, El Salvador
	Gutiérrez (?); ? (?)		? (?)

== Head-to-head record ==
Head to head records
Opponent	P	W	D	L	GF	GA	GD	W%	D%	L%
Colombia	1	0	0	1	2	3	–1	0	0	100
Costa Rica	11	1	0	10	7	56	–49	9.09	0	90.91
Cuba	2	1	0	1	6	6	0	50	0	50
Curaçao	3	2	1	0	5	2	+3	66.67	33.33	0
Honduras	6	2	1	3	12	10	+2	33.33	16.67	50
Guatemala	7	3	2	2	21	13	+8	42.86	28.57	28.57
Mexico	2	0	0	2	1	14	–13	0	0	100
Nicaragua	4	4	0	0	35	3	+32	100	0	0
Panama	7	4	0	3	16	13	+3	57.14	0	42.86
Venezuela	1	1	0	0	3	2	+1	100	0	0
Totals	44	18	4	22	108	121	–13	40.91	9.09	50
