= Football at the 1930 Central American and Caribbean Games – Men's team squads =

The following is a list of squads for each nation competing in football at the 1930 Central American and Caribbean Games in Havana.

== Costa Rica ==
Head coach: (Costa Rica) Manolo Rodríguez

No.	Pos.	Player	Date of birth (age)	Caps	Goals	Club
—	GK	Manuel Rodríguez	20 July 1899 (aged 30)	1	0	
—	GK	Carlos Ulloa		0	0	
—	DF	Arturo Alfaro		0	0	
—	DF	Humberto Saborío		0	0	
—	MF	Fausto Argüello		0	0	
—	MF	Guillermo Elizondo	2 May 1908 (aged 21)	0	0	
—	MF	Luis Montero		0	0	
—	MF	Francisco Solé		0	0	
—	FW	Ricardo Bermúdez	23 May 1895 (aged 34)	1	0	
—	FW	Hernán Bolaños	20 March 1912 (aged 17)	0	0	(Costa Rica) Alajuelense
—	FW	José Fonseca	10 May 1905 (aged 24)	0	0	
—	FW	Rafael Madrigal	4 November 1902 (aged 27)	1	2	
—	FW	Braulio Morales		0	0	
—	FW	Enrique Solera		0	0	
—	FW	Salvador Soto	4 November 1909 (aged 20)	0	0	(Costa Rica) Alajuelense
—	FW	Salvador Tabash		0	0	

== Cuba ==
Head coach: (Cuba) Antonio Orobio

No.	Pos.	Player	Date of birth (age)	Caps	Goals	Club
—	GK	Ricardo Más		0	0	
—	DF	Gabriel Becerra		0	0	
—	DF	Rafael Gómez		0	0	
—	DF	Ignacio Pérez		0	0	
—	MF	Luis Casanova		0	0	
—	MF	Sergio Luis Ochoa		0	0	
—	MF	Luis Toth		0	0	
—	MF	Manuel Villaverde		0	0	
—	FW	Enrique Ferrer		0	0	
—	FW	Pedro Ferrer	1908 (aged 27)	0	0	(Cuba) Iberia Havana
—	FW	Antonio García		0	0	
—	FW	Mario López Alfonso		0	0	
—	FW	Ángel Martínez		0	0	
—	FW	Rolando Rosillo		0	0	
—	FW	Antero Valdés		0	0	
—		Enrique Fernández				
—		Aurelio González				
—		José M. González				
—		Vicente Rodríguez		0	0	

== El Salvador ==
Head coach: (United States) Mark Scott Thompson

No.	Pos.	Player	Date of birth (age)	Caps	Goals	Club
—	GK	Carlos Cañas		0	0	
—	GK	Guillermo Vides		0	0	
—	DF	Nino Bengoa		1	0	
—	DF	Ricardo Paredes		0	0	
—	MF	Carbilio Tomasino		0	0	
—	MF	Felipe Angulo		0	0	
—	MF	Manuel González		0	0	
—	MF	Rubén Guerra Castro		0	0	
—	MF	Arturo Ordóñez		0	0	
—	FW	Carlos Araújo		0	0	
—	FW	Mario Calvo		0	0	
—	FW	José Cañas		1	0	
—	FW	Rafael Carías		0	0	
—	FW	Salvador Herrera		0	0	
—	FW	Gustavo Marroquín		2	7	(United States) Fortuna SC
—	FW	Mario Tirello		0	0	

== Guatemala ==
Head coach: (Costa Rica) Roberto Figueredo

No.	Pos.	Player	Date of birth (age)	Caps	Goals	Club
—	GK	Francisco Echeverría		0	0	
—	DF	Rogelio Echeverría		0	0	
—	MF	Augusto Sánchez		0	0	
—	MF	José María Magaña		0	0	
—	MF	León Arango		3	0	
—	MF	Leopoldo Rodríguez		0	0	
—	FW	Conrado García		0	0	
—	FW	Enrique Batres		0	0	
—	FW	Hermógenes Sandoval		0	0	
—	FW	Lisandro Bocaletti		3	1	
—		Rafael de León		0	0	

== Honduras ==
Head coach:

No.	Pos.	Player	Date of birth (age)	Caps	Goals	Club
—	GK	Esteban Díaz		0	0	
—	DF	Gonzalo Argeñal		0	0	
—	DF	Miguel Díaz		0	0	
—	MF	Carlos Valladares		0	0	(Honduras) Motagua
—	MF	G. Murillo		0	0	
—	MF	José María Zúñiga		0	0	(Honduras) Motagua
—	FW	Alonso Sánchez		0	0	
—	FW	Alejandro Talbot		0	0	
—	FW	Arístides Randales		0	0	(Honduras) Motagua
—	FW	Lorenzo Navarro		0	0	
—	FW	M. Porras		0	0	
—		Daniel Bustillo		0	0	(Honduras) Motagua
—		Emilio Escoto		0	0	
—		Fernando Ferrera		0	0	
—		Francisco Flores		0	0	(Honduras) Motagua
—		Tatino Gálvez		0	0	
—		Alonso García S.		0	0	
—		Freddy Hall		0	0	
—		Carlos Mercadal		0	0	
—		Juan Miselem		0	0	
—		Juan Navarro		0	0	
—		Mario A. Ponce		0	0	(Honduras) Motagua
—		Roberto Ramírez		0	0	
—		Erasmo Velásquez		0	0	

== Jamaica ==
Head coach:

No.	Pos.	Player	Date of birth (age)	Caps	Goals	Club
