= Emilio Guardado =

Salvadoran football coach

Personal information
- Place of birth: El Salvador

Senior career*
Years	Team	Apps	(Gls)
1935	Arsenal		
- Club Deportivo 33

International career
1935	El Salvador		

Managerial career
- España F.C.
- Libertad FC
- 1950–1952: Atlético Marte
- 1959–1960: El Salvador
- Alianza F.C.
Medal record
Representing El Salvador
Men's Football
Central American and Caribbean Games
Bronze medal – third place	1935 El Salvador	Team competition
- * Club domestic league appearances and goals

Emilio Guardado also known as Milo, was a former Salvadoran football coach.

== Honours ==
El Salvador

- Central American and Caribbean Games bronze medal: 1935
