= Eladio Rosabal Cordero Stadium (1949) =

Football stadium in Costa Rica

Estadio Eladio Rosabal Cordero
- La Casa de Don Eladio "Don Eladio's House"
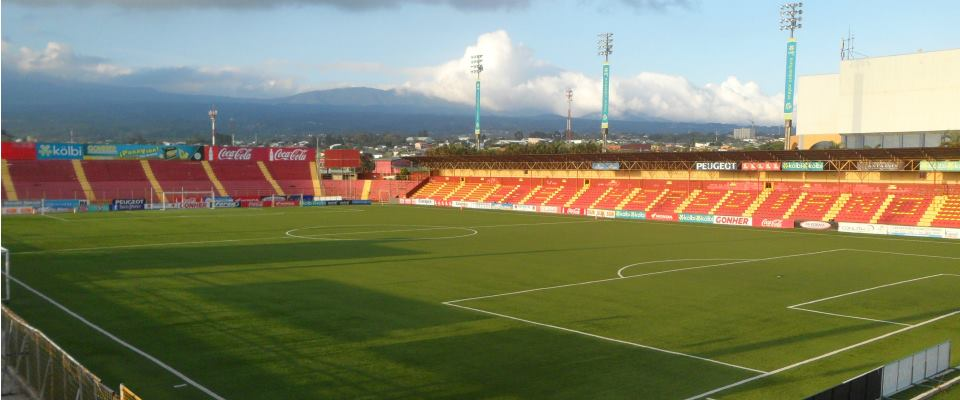
- The stadium seen from the southwestern stand
- Interactive map of Estadio Eladio Rosabal Cordero
- Full name: Eladio Rosabal Cordero
- Location: Heredia, Costa Rica
- Coordinates: 9.99963°N 84.123065°W
- Capacity: 8,700
- Surface: artificial

Construction
- Opened: 1949
- Closed: 15 December 2019
- Demolished: 22 July 2020

Tenant
- Herediano

Estadio Eladio Rosabal Cordero was a multi-purpose stadium in Heredia, Costa Rica, and was the home stadium of the Costa Rican First Division team, Club Sport Herediano. It was inaugurated on August 21, 1949, with a match between Club Sport Herediano and Sociedad Gimnástica Española, which ended 3-1 in favour of Herediano.

In 1964, it was officially named the Eladio Rosabal Cordero Stadium, after Herediano legend Eladio Rosabal Cordero, who founded the club in 1921.

The stadium had a capacity of 8.700 people, and was primarily used for football matches. The stadium has hosted Costa Rica's First Division finals, several official Concacaf matches, as well as friendly matches of the Costa Rica national football team.

The stadium was demolished in 2020, and the venue space has since undergone construction to build a new home stadium (Transcomer Arena). The construction process has been marred with numerous delays, but is expected to be completed by late 2026.
