= Crowle =

Crowle may refer to:

== Places ==
- Crowle, Lincolnshire, England
- Crowle, Worcestershire, England

== People ==
- Alfred C. Crowle, Cornish manager of the Mexican football team.
