= Américo González =

Américo González may refer to:

- Américo González (footballer), Salvadoran footballer
- Américo González (pentathlete) (born 1925), Uruguayan modern pentathlete
