= 1936 Campeonato Nacional Primera División =

Campeonato Nacional de Fútbol Profesional
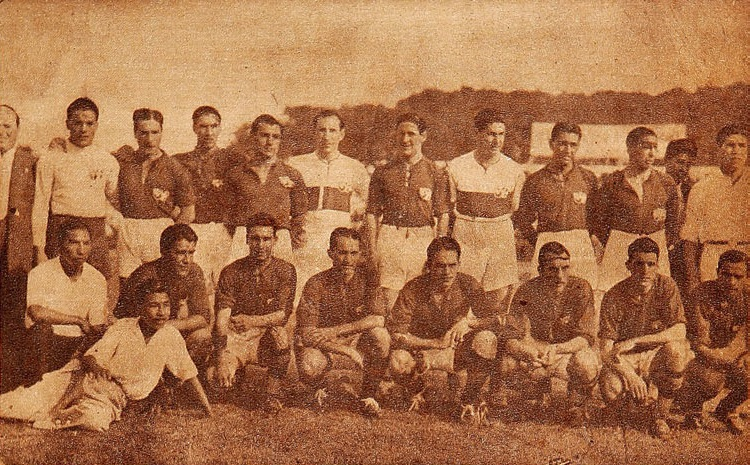
- Audax Italiano, champions
- Dates: 24 May 1936 – 22 November 1936
- Champions: Audax Italiano (1st title)
- Matches: 30
- Goals: 157 (5.23 per match)
- Top goalscorer: Hernán Bolaños (14 goals)
- Total attendance: 77,294
- Average attendance: 2,576

The 1936 Campeonato Nacional de Fútbol Profesional was Chilean first tier's 4th season. Audax Italiano were the champions, breaking the hegemony which Magallanes maintained between 1933 and 1935, winning three consecutive titles.

== Scores ==
	AUD	BAD	COL	MAG	SMO	UES
Audax		4–4	3–2	4–1	3–0	4–3
Bádminton	1–8		3–2	2–6	2–2	3–2
Colo-Colo	1–5	2–2		1–2	6–2	3–3
Magallanes	5–2	8–2	1–3		1–2	3–1
S. Morning	1–3	7–3	1–3	3–1		1–1
U. Española	2–2	2–1	2–3	1–3	1–2	

== Standings ==
Pos	Team	Pld	W	D	L	GF	GA	GR	Pts	Qualification
1	Audax Italiano	10	7	2	1	38	20	1.900	16	Champions
2	Magallanes	10	6	0	4	31	21	1.476	12	
3	Colo-Colo	10	4	2	4	26	24	1.083	10	
4	Santiago Morning	10	4	2	4	21	24	0.875	10	
5	Badminton	10	2	3	5	23	43	0.535	7	
6	Unión Española	10	1	3	6	18	25	0.720	5	

Campeonato Profesional
1936 champions
Audax Italiano
1st title

== Topscorer ==
Name	Team	Goals
(Costa Rica) Hernán Bolaños	Audax Italiano	14
