= Independence Centenary Games =

International football tournament

Tournament details
- Host country: Guatemala
- City: Guatemala City
- Dates: 14–18 September 1921
- Teams: 4
- Venue: 1 (in 1 host city)

Final positions
- Champions: Costa Rica (1st title)
- Runners-up: Guatemala
- Third place: El Salvador
- Fourth place: Honduras

Tournament statistics
- Matches played: 3
- Goals scored: 22 (7.33 per match)
- Top scorer: (Costa Rica) Rafael Ángel Madrigal (6 goals)

The Independence Centenary Athletic Games of Central America (Spanish: Juegos Atléticos del Centenario de la Independencia de Centroamérica) was an association football tournament organized to celebrate 100 years of Central American independence from the Spanish Empire. The national teams of Costa Rica, El Salvador, Guatemala, and Honduras participated in the tournament that was hosted in Guatemala City between 14 and 18 September 1921.

== Participants ==
Four of the original five members of the Federal Republic of Central America (1823–1841) participated in the tournament: Costa Rica, El Salvador, Guatemala, and Honduras. The tournament was the first time each nation played an international association football match.

Former Costa Rican president Rafael Iglesias Castro attended the tournament.

== Venue ==
The three games of the tournament were all held in the Campo de Marte in Guatemala City, Guatemala.

== Format ==
The tournament was a single-elimination tournament. Matches were 80 minutes long.

== Squads ==
=== Costa Rica squad ===
The following table lists the members of the Costa Rican squad.

No.	Pos.	Player	Date of birth (age)	Caps	Club
	GK	Manuel Rodríguez	20 July 1899 (aged 22)	0	(Costa Rica) C.S. La Libertad
	DF	Gilberto Arguedas	1 January 1895 (aged 26)	0	(Costa Rica) C.S. Herediano
	DF	Feis Tabash	Unknown	0	(Costa Rica) C.S. La Libertad
	MF	Rodolfo Peralta	Unknown	0	(Costa Rica) C.S. La Libertad
	MF	Eladio Rosabal (captain)	15 September 1894 (aged 26)	0	(Costa Rica) C.S. Herediano
	MF	Roberto Figueredo	13 September 1894 (aged 27)	0	L.D. Guatemala
	FW	Jorge Solera	Unknown	0	(Costa Rica) L.D. Alajuelense
	FW	Claudio Arguedas	Unknown	0	(Costa Rica) C.S. Herediano
	FW	Joaquín Gutiérrez	18 September 1893 (aged 27)	0	(Costa Rica) C.S. Herediano
	FW	Rafael Madrigal	4 November 1902 (aged 18)	0	(Costa Rica) C.S. La Libertad
	FW	Ricardo Bermúdez	Unknown	0	(Costa Rica) S.G. Española
	FW	Pedro Quirce	Unknown	0	(Costa Rica) S.G. Española

=== El Salvador squad ===
The following table lists the members of the Salvadoran squad.

No.	Pos.	Player	Date of birth (age)	Caps	Club
	GK	Carlos Escobar	Unknown	0	(El Salvador) ?
	DF	Santiago Barrachina (Spanish)	Unknown	0	(El Salvador) ?
	DF	José Huezo	Unknown	0	(El Salvador) ?
	DF	Benjamín Sandoval	Unknown	0	(El Salvador) ?
	MF	Emilio Dawson	Unknown	0	(El Salvador) ?
	MF	Emilio Detruit (French)	Unknown	0	(El Salvador) ?
	MF	Víctor Recinos	Unknown	0	(El Salvador) ?
	FW	Guillermo Alcaine	Unknown	0	(El Salvador) ?
	FW	Guillermo Sandoval	Unknown	0	(El Salvador) ?
	FW	Enrique Lindo	Unknown	0	(El Salvador) ?
	FW	José Alcaine	Unknown	0	(El Salvador) ?

=== Guatemala squad ===
The following table lists the members of the Guatemalan squad.

No.	Pos.	Player	Date of birth (age)	Caps	Club
	GK	Ricardo Lenhoff	Unknown	0	(Guatemala) ?
	GK	Ramiro Gálvez	Unknown	0	(Guatemala) ?
	DF	Luis Asturias	Unknown	0	(Guatemala) ?
	DF	Carlos Aguirre (co-captain)	Unknown	0	(Guatemala) ?
	DF	José Minondo	Unknown	0	(Guatemala) ?
	MF	David Barrios	Unknown	0	(Guatemala) ?
	MF	Arturo Aguirre	Unknown	0	(Guatemala) ?
	MF	Wenceslao Aldaz	Unknown	0	(Guatemala) ?
	FW	Julio Dougherty	Unknown	0	(Guatemala) ?
	FW	Fernando Minondo	Unknown	0	(Guatemala) ?
	FW	Mariano Enríquez	Unknown	0	(Guatemala) ?
	FW	Constantino Kiehnle (co-captain)	Unknown	0	(Guatemala) ?
	FW	Rafael Villacorta (co-captain)	Unknown	0	(Guatemala) ?
	FW	Seagrave Smith	Unknown	0	(Guatemala) ?
	FW	Enrique Álvarez	Unknown	0	(Guatemala) ?

=== Honduras squad ===
The following table lists the members of the Honduran squad.

No.	Pos.	Player	Date of birth (age)	Caps	Club
	GK	Luis Bolaños	Unknown	0	(Honduras) ?
	DF	Arístides Raudales (captain)	Unknown	0	(Honduras) ?
	DF	Ricardo Aguilar	Unknown	0	(Honduras) ?
	DF	Ricardo Fernández	Unknown	0	(Honduras) ?
	MF	Adán Boza	Unknown	0	(Honduras) ?
	MF	Arnold Estrada	Unknown	0	(Honduras) ?
	MF	Mariano Carazo	Unknown	0	(Honduras) ?
	FW	Ramón Rodríguez	Unknown	0	(Honduras) ?
	FW	Julio Cueto	Unknown	0	(Honduras) ?
	FW	Carlos Maramoros	Unknown	0	(Honduras) ?
	FW	Esteban Peralta	Unknown	0	(Honduras) ?

== Tournament ==
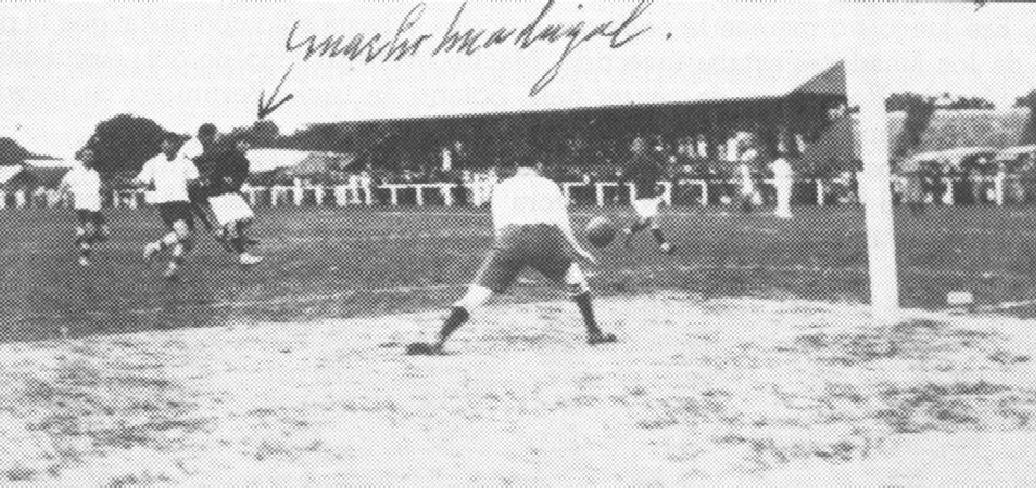
The first match of the Independence Centenary Games, Costa Rica vs El Salvador

=== Bracket ===
Semifinals
14 September – Guatemala City
Costa Rica	7
El Salvador	0
14 September – Guatemala City
Guatemala	9
Honduras	0

Final
18 September – Guatemala City
Guatemala	0
Costa Rica	6

=== Semifinals ===
Costa Rican center forward Joaquín Gutiérrez scored the match's first goal in the 9th minute.

14 September 1921
9:30 CST

Costa Rica	7–0	El Salvador
Gutiérrez 9'; C. Arguedas (?); Madrigal (?); Bermúdez (?)	Report

Campo de Marte, Guatemala City
Attendance: 2,000

GK	Manuel Rodríguez
RB	Gilberto Arguedas
LB	Feis Tabash
RM	Rodolfo Peralta
CM	Eladio Rosabal (c)
LM	Ricardo Bermúdez
RW	Jorge Solera
CF	Joaquín Gutiérrez
CF	Pedro Quirce
CF	Claudio Arguedas
LW	Rafael Madrigal
Managers:
Manuel Rodríguez and Joaquín Gutiérrez

GK	Carlos Escobar
DF	Santiago Barrachina
DF	José Huezo
DF	Benjamín Sandoval
MF	Emilio Dawson
MF	Emilio Detruit
MF	Víctor Recinos
FW	Guillermo Alcaine
FW	José Alcaine
FW	Guillermo Sandoval
FW	Enrique Lindo
Manager:
Unknown

Match rules:

- 80 minutes

14 September 1921
11:30 CST

Guatemala	9–0	Honduras
F. Minondo (?); Kiehnle (?); Aldaz (?); Enríquez (?); Dougherty (?); Villacorta (?)	Report

Campo de Marte, Guatemala City
Referee: Salvador González (Costa Rica)

GK	Ricardo Lenhoff
DF	Luis Asturias
DF	José Minondo
MF	David Barrios
MF	Arturo Aguirre
MF	Wenceslao Aldaz
FW	Julio Dougherty
FW	Rafael Villacorta (c)
FW	Constantino Kiehnle
FW	Fernando Minondo
FW	Mariano Enríquez
Manager:
Rafael Villacorta

GK	Luis Bolaños
DF	Arístides Raudales (c)
DF	Ricardo Aguilar
DF	Ricardo Fernández
MF	Adán Boza
MF	Arnold Estrada
MF	Mariano Carazo
FW	Ramón Rodríguez
FW	Julio Cueto
FW	Carlos Maramoros
FW	Esteban Peralta
Manager:
Arístides Raudales

Match rules:

- 80 minutes

=== Final ===
Guatemalan president Carlos Herrera awarded the Costa Rican team the Championship Cup after the match.

18 September 1921
10:30 CST

Guatemala	0–6	Costa Rica
	Report	Madrigal (?); C. Arguedas (?); Solera (?); Figueredo (?)

Campo de Marte, Guatemala City
Attendance: 10,000

GK	Ramiro Gálvez
DF	José Minondo
DF	Carlos Aguirre (c)
DF	Luis Asturias
MF	Arturo Aguirre
MF	David Barrios
FW	Seagrave Smith
FW	Fernando Minondo
FW	Constantino Kiehnle (c)
FW	Mariano Enríquez
FW	Enrique Álvarez
Managers:
Carlos Aguirre and Constantino Kiehnle

GK	Manuel Rodríguez
RB	Gilberto Arguedas
LB	Feis Tabash
RM	Rodolfo Peralta
CM	Eladio Rosabal (c)
LM	Roberto Figueredo
RW	Jorge Solera
CF	Joaquín Gutiérrez
CF	Pedro Quirce
CF	Claudio Arguedas
LW	Rafael Madrigal
Managers:
Manuel Rodríguez and Joaquín Gutiérrez

Match rules:

- 80 minutes

== Goalscorers ==
There were 22 goals scored in 3 matches, for an average of 7.33 goals per match.

6 goals

- (Costa Rica) Rafael Madrigal

3 goals

- (Costa Rica) Claudio Arguedas
- (Guatemala) Fernando Minondo

2 goals

- (Guatemala) Constantino Kiehnle

1 goal

- (Guatemala) Wenceslao Aldaz
- (Costa Rica) Ricardo Bermúdez
- (Guatemala) Julio Dougherty
- (Guatemala) Mariano Enríquez
- (Costa Rica) Joaquín Gutiérrez
- (Costa Rica) Roberto Figueredo
- (Costa Rica) Jorge Solera
- (Guatemala) Rafael Villacorta

Source: RSSSF

== Overall rankings ==
Ranking	Team	P	W	D	L	GF	GA	GD	Pts
Champions	Costa Rica	2	2	0	0	13	0	+13	4
Runners-up	Guatemala	2	1	0	1	9	6	+3	2
Third place	El Salvador	1	0	0	1	0	7	–7	0
Fourth place	Honduras	1	0	0	1	0	9	–9	0

== See also ==
- Football at the Central American and Caribbean Games
