= Pablo Ferré Elías =

Spanish footballer, manager, and referee

Personal information
- Full name: Pablo Ferré Elías
- Date of birth: Unknown
- Place of birth: Spain
- Date of death: Unknown
- Place of death: Unknown

Senior career*
Years	Team	Apps	(Gls)
- C.D. 33

Managerial career
- 1935–1938: El Salvador
- 1938–1941: Quequeisque
- 1940: Club Deportivo Universidad Católica
Medal record
Representing El Salvador
Men's Football
Central American and Caribbean Games
Bronze medal – third place	1935 El Salvador	Team competition
- * Club domestic league appearances and goals

Pablo Ferré Elías (born in Spain) was a Spanish football player, manager and referee.

He played for C.D. 33 .

He was the second person and first Spaniard to coach the El Salvador national football team in their history, during the 1935 Central American and Caribbean Games. He coached the team from 1935 to 1938.

In 1940, he was appointed to be the manager of the Club Deportivo Universidad Católica in Chile.
