= Eladio Rosabal Cordero Stadium =

Stadium under construction in Heredia, Costa Rica

- Estadio Eladio Rosabal Cordero
- La casa de don Eladio; Mr. Eladio's House
- Logo under the Transcomer sponsorship

- Final design of the stadium
- Interactive map of Eladio Rosabal Cordero Stadium
- Full name: Eladio Rosabal Cordero Stadium
- Address: 16th Street; Cubujuqui; Heredia
- Location: Heredia, Costa Rica
- Coordinates: 9.99963°N 84.123065°W
- Owner: Herediano
- Operator: Fuerza Herediana
- Capacity: 12,000
- Executive suites: 33
- Type: Stadium
- Event: Football

Construction
- Built: 2020–
- Opened: 2026 (expected)
- Cost: $45 million (2025)
- Architect: Daniel González
- Builder: (Guatemala) APSA (steel structure)

Tenant
- Herediano

Website
- Estadio Rosabal Cordero

The Eladio Rosabal Cordero Stadium (Spanish: Estadio Eladio Rosabal Cordero), also referred to as Transcomer Arena for sponsorship reasons, is a stadium in Heredia, Costa Rica. Built on the site of the old Rosabal Cordero stadium, which had stood from 1949 until 2020. The stadium will serve as Herediano's home stadium.

The construction process has been marred with numerous delays.
