= 1937 Campeonato Nacional Primera División =

Campeonato Nacional de Fútbol Profesional
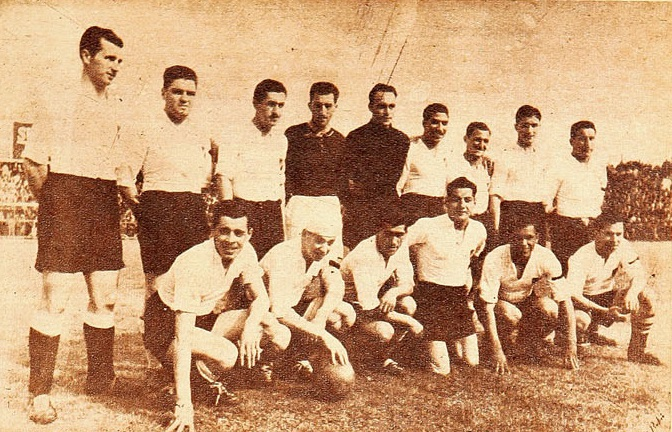
- Colo-Colo, champions
- Dates: 23 May 1937 – 28 November 1937
- Champions: Colo-Colo (1st title)
- Matches: 42
- Goals: 227 (5.4 per match)
- Top goalscorer: Hernán Bolaños (16 goals)
- Total attendance: 104,993
- Average attendance: 2,499

The 1937 Campeonato Nacional de Fútbol Profesional was Chilean first tier’s 5th season. Colo-Colo were the champions, achieving their first ever title.

== Scores ==
	AUD	BAD	COL	MAG	SMO	UES	SWA
Audax		3–3	2–4	3–5	2–3	3–2	4–3
Bádminton	3–5		2–7	3–5	1–4	2–3	3–4
Colo-Colo	7–2	3–3		3–3	5–2	2–0	3–1
Magallanes	1–1	6–6	1–3		5–6	1–2	1–2
S. Morning	2–5	5–1	3–3	6–5		1–2	7–2
U. Española	1–2	4–3	1–2	1–1	3–1		2–1
S. Wanderers	0–1	0–1	0–5	2–5	0–4	2–1	

== Standings ==
Pos	Team	Pld	W	D	L	GF	GA	GR	Pts	Qualification
1	Colo-Colo	12	9	3	0	47	20	2.350	21	Champions
2	Magallanes	12	7	2	3	38	32	1.188	16	
3	Unión Española	12	8	0	4	22	21	1.048	16	
4	Santiago Morning	12	6	1	5	39	34	1.147	13	
5	Audax Italiano	12	5	2	5	33	35	0.943	12	
6	Badminton	12	2	2	8	31	49	0.633	6	
7	Santiago Wanderers	12	0	0	12	18	37	0.486	0	

Campeonato Profesional
1937 champions
Colo-Colo
1st title

== Topscorer ==
Name	Team	Goals
(Costa Rica) Hernán Bolaños	Audax Italiano	16
