= Américo González (footballer) =

Salvadoran footballer and coach

Personal information
- Full name: Américo González Mena
- Date of birth: 13/08/1912
- Place of birth: El Salvador
- Position: Defender

Senior career*
| Years | Team | Apps | (Gls) |
| 1923 | Hercules | | |

International career
| 1935–1941 | El Salvador | | |

Managerial career
- 1943–1948: El Salvador
Medal record
Representing El Salvador
Men's Football
Central American and Caribbean Games
| Bronze medal – third place | 1935 El Salvador | Team competition |
- * Club domestic league appearances and goals

Américo González, also known as Américo, was a former Salvadoran international footballer and coach.

He was the first Salvadoran coach to coach the national football team. He played as a defender for the national team from 1935 to 1941.

== Honours ==
International

- Central American and Caribbean Games Bronze Medal (1): 1935
