= Carlos Laviada =

Mexican footballer

Personal information
- Date of birth: 16 May 1916
- Place of birth: Mexico
- Position: Defender

Senior career*
Years	Team	Apps	(Gls)
1933–1934	Asturias FC		
1934–1936	Real Oviedo		
1936–1939	Asturias FC		
1940–1941	Atlante FC		
1941–1950	Real Club España		
- * Club domestic league appearances and goals

Carlos Laviada (born 16 May 1916) was a Mexican footballer who played as a defender.

== Career ==
Laviada started his career with Mexican side Asturias FC. In 1934, he signed for Spanish La Liga side Real Oviedo. He left the club due to the Spanish Civil War. In 1936, he returned to Mexican side Asturias FC. In 1940, he signed for Mexican side Atlante FC. In 1941, he signed for Mexican side Real Club España.

== Style of play ==
Laviada mainly operated as a defender. He was described as "slow... with precise play".

== Personal life ==
Laviada was born in 1916 in Mexico City, Mexico. After retiring from professional football, he worked as the president of the Mexican Football Federation.
