= Football at the 1935 Central American and Caribbean Games =

1935 football tournament

Tournament details
- Host country: El Salvador
- City: San Salvador
- Dates: 24 March – 3 April
- Teams: 6 (from 1 confederation)
- Venue(s): 1 (in 1 host city)

Final positions
- Champions: Mexico (1st title)
- Runners-up: Costa Rica
- Third place: El Salvador
- Fourth place: Cuba

Tournament statistics
- Matches played: 15
- Goals scored: 82 (5.47 per match)
- Top scorer(s): (Costa Rica) Emmanuel Amador; (Mexico) Hilario López; (10 goals each)

The football tournament at the 1935 Central American and Caribbean Games was held in San Salvador from 24 March to 3 April. The tournament was the second association football tournament held at the Central American and Caribbean Games, with the first tournament being held in 1930 in Havana. All matches were held at the Estadio Nacional Flor Blanca.

Six national football teams participated in the tournament: Costa Rica, Cuba, El Salvador, Guatemala, Honduras, and Mexico. Mexico were the gold medalists, winning its first gold medal for association football at the Central American and Caribbean Games. Costa Rica were the silver medalists while El Salvador, the hosts, were the bronze medalists. Cuba, the gold medalists in 1930, came in fourth place, while Honduras and Guatemala came in fifth and sixth place, respectively. A total of 82 goals were scored during 15 matches played; Costa Rica's Emmanuel Amador and Mexico's Hilario López were the top scorers, scoring 10 goals each.

== Participants ==
Six countries participated in the tournament. The participants were:

- Costa Rica
- Cuba
- El Salvador (hosts)
- Guatemala
- Honduras
- Mexico

=== Medal winners ===
Event	Gold	Silver	Bronze
Men's football	Mexico (MEX)	Costa Rica (CRC)	El Salvador (SLV)

== Venue ==
All matches were held at the Estadio Nacional Flor Blanca in San Salvador.

San Salvador	Football at the 1935 Central American and Caribbean Games is located in El Salvador
Estadio Nacional Flor Blanca	Football at the 1935 Central American and Caribbean Games is located in El Salvador
Capacity: 35,000	Football at the 1935 Central American and Caribbean Games is located in El Salvador
Estadio Nacional Flor Blanca	Football at the 1935 Central American and Caribbean Games is located in El Salvador

== Squads ==
Each squad consisted of between 16 and 23 players. Each squad had two goalkeepers, except for Costa Rica which had three. The Mexican Football Federation sent Club Necaxa to represent Mexico at the tournament as the club was considered to be the best in the Mexican First Division at the time. Out of the 17 players on Mexico's squad, 13 were from Club Necaxa while the other 4 were from 4 other clubs.

== Officiating ==
The following individuals were selected to be referees and assistant referees for the tournament:

Referees

- Alfredo Esquivel (Costa Rica)
- Manuel Rodríguez (Costa Rica)
- Augusto Escalante (El Salvador)
- Salvador Herrera (El Salvador)
- Germán Núñez (Mexico)
- Jacobo de Foinquinos (Spain)

Assistant referees

- Francisco Calvo (Costa Rica)
- Jorge Van der Laat (Costa Rica)
- Ignacio Montalvo (Cuba)
- Alfonso Ramos (Cuba)
- Luis Alvarenga (El Salvador)
- Óscar Ambrogi (El Salvador)
- Eliseo Colorado (El Salvador)
- Ramón Durán (El Salvador)
- Carlos Fuentes (El Salvador)
- José Menéndez (El Salvador)
- Rodrigo Viscarra (El Salvador)
- Alfred Crowle (England)
- Lisandro Bocaletti (Guatemala)
- Enrique Molina (Guatemala)
- Luis Gómez (Honduras)
- Víctor Andreu (Mexico)
- Pablo González (Mexico)

== Table ==
A 2 point system used during the tournament.

Pos	Team	Pld	W	D	L	GF	GA	GD	Pts
1	Mexico (C)	5	5	0	0	29	5	+24	10
2	Costa Rica	5	4	0	1	18	7	+11	8
3	El Salvador (H)	5	2	0	3	15	20	−5	4
4	Cuba	5	2	0	3	8	13	−5	4
5	Honduras	5	1	1	3	6	20	−14	3
6	Guatemala	5	0	1	4	6	17	−11	1

Source: RSSSF
(C) Champions; (H) Hosts

== Results ==
24 March 1935
8:00 CST (UTC−6)

El Salvador	4–1	Cuba
Quintanilla 41', 77'; Cruz 72', 75'	Report	Requejo 67'

Estadio Nacional Flor Blanca, San Salvador
Referee: German Núñez (Mexico)

25 March 1935
8:00 CST (UTC−6)

Costa Rica	4–3	Guatemala
Varela 25'; Amador 34'; Evans 36', 68'	Report	Ruano 13'; Hernández 50', 60'

Estadio Nacional Flor Blanca, San Salvador
Referee: German Núñez (Mexico)
25 March 1935
16:00 CST (UTC−6)

Cuba	3–0	Honduras
Rodríguez 20'; Barquín 85'; Sosa 90'	Report

Estadio Nacional Flor Blanca, San Salvador
Referee: Manuel Rodríguez (Costa Rica)

27 March 1935
8:00 CST (UTC−6)

El Salvador	1–8	Mexico
Cruz 26'	Report	García 23', 70'; Cortina 51'; Lozano 62', 75'; López 73', 80', 86'

Estadio Nacional Flor Blanca, San Salvador
Attendance: 10,000
Referee: Manuel Rodríguez (Costa Rica)
27 March 1935
16:00 CST (UTC−6)

Cuba	2–1	Guatemala
Requejo 50'; Barquín 80'		Mendizábal 70'

Estadio Nacional Flor Blanca, San Salvador
Referee: Manuel Rodríguez (Costa Rica)

28 March 1935
8:00 CST (UTC−6)

El Salvador	3–4	Honduras
Cruz 18'; Morales 59'; Chacón 82'	Report	Reyes 10', 50'; Navarro 23'; Medrano 68'

Estadio Nacional Flor Blanca, San Salvador
Referee: Manuel Rodríguez (Costa Rica)
28 March 1935
16:00 CST (UTC−6)

Mexico	5–1	Guatemala
López 1', 28'; Lores 17'; Cortina 32'; García 39'	Report	Mendizábal 80'

Estadio Nacional Flor Blanca, San Salvador
Attendance: 8,000
Referee: Alfredo Esquivel (Costa Rica)

30 March 1935
8:00 CST (UTC−6)

Mexico	6–1	Cuba
Pérez 3'; López 33', 44'; Lores 53'; Rosas 62'; Lozano 79'	Report	Requejo 25'

Estadio Nacional Flor Blanca, San Salvador
Attendance: 15,000
Referee: Manuel Rodríguez (Costa Rica)
30 March 1935
16:00 CST (UTC−6)

Costa Rica	6–1	El Salvador
Amador 4', 14', 51'; Hütt 54'; Fernández 68', 88'	Report	Morales 38'

Estadio Nacional Flor Blanca, San Salvador
Referee: German Núñez (Mexico)

31 March 1935
8:00 CST (UTC−6)

Honduras	0–0	Guatemala

Estadio Nacional Flor Blanca, San Salvador
Referee: Manuel Rodríguez (Costa Rica)
31 March 1935
16:00 CST (UTC−6)

Costa Rica	2–1	Cuba
Amador 13', 53'	Report	Rosillo 63'

Estadio Nacional Flor Blanca, San Salvador
Referee: German Núñez (Mexico)

1 April 1935
8:00 CST (UTC−6)

Mexico	8–2	Honduras
Pérez 3'; López 8', 55', 80'; Lores 26', 42', 73'; Lozano 29'	Report	Castro 69'; Puerto 88'

Estadio Nacional Flor Blanca, San Salvador
Attendance: 15,000
Referee: Salvador Herrera (El Salvador)

2 April 1935
16:00 CST (UTC−6)

Mexico	2–0	Costa Rica
Pérez 26'; Lozano 67'	Report

Estadio Nacional Flor Blanca, San Salvador
Attendance: 20,000
Referee: Jacobo de Foinquinos (Spain)

3 April 1935
8:00 CST (UTC−6)

Costa Rica	6–0	Honduras
Evans 5'; Amador 15', 25', ?', ?'; Dávila ?'	Report

Estadio Nacional Flor Blanca, San Salvador
Referee: Augusto Escalante (El Salvador)
3 April 1935
16:00 CST (UTC−6)

El Salvador	6–1	Guatemala
Quintanilla 44', ?'; Chacón ?'; Cruz ?', ?'; Hernández ?'	Report	Mendizábal 38'

Estadio Nacional Flor Blanca, San Salvador
Referee: Manuel Rodríguez (Costa Rica)

1935 Central American
and Caribbean Games

Mexico
1st title

== Statistics ==
=== Goalscorers ===
There were 82 goals scored in 15 matches, for an average of 5.47 goals per match.

10 goals

- (Costa Rica) Emmanuel Amador
- (Mexico) Hilario López

6 goals

- (El Salvador) Miguel Cruz

5 goals

- (Mexico) Julio Lores
- (Mexico) Tomás Lozano

4 goals

- (El Salvador) Fidel Quintanilla

3 goals

- (Costa Rica) Wálter Evans
- (Cuba) Miguel Requejo
- (Guatemala) Arturo Mendizábal
- (Mexico) Vicente García
- (Mexico) Luis Pérez

2 goals

- (Costa Rica) Jorge Fernández
- (Cuba) Jacinto Barquín
- (El Salvador) Armando Chacón
- (El Salvador) José Alejandro Morales
- (Guatemala) Salvador Hernández
- (Honduras) José María Reyes
- (Mexico) Luis García Cortina

1 goal

- (Costa Rica) Jorge Dávila
- (Costa Rica) José Hütt
- (Costa Rica) Aníbal Varela
- (Cuba) Andrés Rodríguez
- (Cuba) Rolando Rosillo
- (Cuba) Mario Sosa
- (El Salvador) Andrés Hernández
- (Guatemala) Luis Alberto Ruano
- (Honduras) Alfonso Castro
- (Honduras) Francisco Jorge Medrano
- (Honduras) Lorenzo Navarro
- (Honduras) Felipe Puerto
- (Mexico) Felipe Rosas

=== Team of the Tournament ===
Ideal XI by RSSSF
Goalkeeper	Defenders	Midfielders	Forwards
(Mexico) Raúl Estrada	(Mexico) Antonio Azpiri (Costa Rica) Eduardo Goldoni	(Mexico) Guillermo Ortega (Mexico) Felipe Rosas (El Salvador) Samuel Astacio	(Costa Rica) Emmanuel Amador (Mexico) Hilario López (El Salvador) Miguel Cruz (Mexico) Julio Lores (Mexico) Tomás Lozano

== See also ==
- Other events hosted by El Salvador
  - Football at the 2002 Central American and Caribbean Games
  - Football at the 2023 Central American and Caribbean Games
