= Miguel Cruz =

Salvadoran footballer (1914–2000)

Personal information
- Full name: Miguel Cruz Paz
- Date of birth: 1914
- Place of birth: El Salvador
- Date of death: 9 March 2000 (aged 85–86)
- Place of death: El Salvador
- Position: Striker

Youth career
- Libertad

Senior career*
Years	Team	Apps	(Gls)
1940–1946	Universidad Católica		

International career
1935–1944	El Salvador	14	(15)
Medal record
Representing El Salvador
Men's Football
Central American and Caribbean Games
Bronze medal – third place	1935 El Salvador	Team competition
- * Club domestic league appearances and goals

Miguel Cruz Paz (1914 – 9 March 2000) was a Salvadoran footballer.

== Club career ==
Nicknamed el Americano (the American), Cruz played club football in El Salvador, before going to Chile to play professionally alongside compatriot Armando Chacón at Universidad Católica.

== International career ==
On March 24, 1935, he made his international debut in El Salvador's first group stage match at the 1935 Central American Games against Cuba, where he also got his first and second goals, scoring the first in a 4–1 victory Cruz scored 16 goals for the El Salvador national football team from 1935 to 1943. He represented his country at the 1935 Central American Games.

== Honours ==
International

- Central American and Caribbean Games Bronze Medal (1): 1935
