= Pedro Ferrer (footballer) =

Cuban footballer

Personal information
- Full name: Pedro Ferrer Mula
- Date of birth: 1908
- Place of birth: Cuba
- Height: 1.77 m (5 ft 10 in)
- Position: Forward

Senior career*
Years	Team	Apps	(Gls)
1930–1938	Iberia Havana		

International career
- Cuba
Medal record
Representing Cuba
Men's Football
Central American and Caribbean Games
Gold medal – first place	1930 Cuba	Team competition
- * Club domestic league appearances and goals

Pedro Ferrer Mula (1908 - date of death unknown) was a Cuban footballer that played in Iberia Havana. Ferrer is deceased.

== International career ==
He represented Cuba at the 1938 FIFA World Cup in France. In his only match against Sweden, Ferrer did not score a goal.

== Honours ==
International

- Central American and Caribbean Games Gold Medal (1): 1930
