= Andrés Rodríguez (footballer) =

Spanish footballer

Personal information
- Full name: Andrés Rodríguez Martínez
- Date of birth: 31 May 2002 (age 24)
- Place of birth: Lorca, Spain
- Height: 1.90 m (6 ft 3 in)
- Position: Centre-back

Team information
- Current team: Las Palmas
- Number: 23

Youth career
- Lorca CFB
- 2020–2021: Villarreal

Senior career*
Years	Team	Apps	(Gls)
2021	Villarreal C	2	(0)
2021–2022	Cartagena B	17	(0)
2022–2023	Racing Murcia	15	(2)
2023–2024	Yeclano	29	(0)
2024–2025	Alcoyano	26	(1)
2025–2026	Teruel	27	(1)
2026–	Las Palmas	1	(0)
- * Club domestic league appearances and goals as of 22 August 2026

Andrés Rodríguez Martínez (born 31 May 2002) is a Spanish footballer who plays as a centre-back for UD Las Palmas.

== Career ==
Born in Lorca, Region of Murcia, Rodríguez played for hometown side Lorca CFB before signing for Villarreal CF in April 2020. He then featured rarely with the club's Juvenil and C-teams, before joining FC Cartagena's reserves in October 2021.

In September 2022, Rodríguez moved to fellow Tercera Federación side Racing Murcia FC. On 22 July of the following year, after missing out promotion in the play-offs, he was presented at Yeclano Deportivo in Segunda Federación.

On 11 June 2024, after becoming an undisputed starter as Yeclano achieved promotion to Primera Federación, Rodríguez agreed to a deal with CD Alcoyano of that category. On 2 July of the following year, he moved to fellow league team CD Teruel.

On 22 June 2026, Rodríguez joined Segunda División side UD Las Palmas on a four-year contract. He made his professional debut on 22 August, coming on as a late substitute for Jefté Betancor in a 2–0 away win over AD Ceuta FC.
