= Luis Pérez (footballer, born 1906) =

Mexican footballer

Personal information
- Full name: Luis Pérez González
- Date of birth: 25 August 1906
- Place of birth: Mexico
- Date of death: 28 May 1963 (aged 56)
- Place of death: Mexico
- Position: Forward

Senior career*
Years	Team	Apps	(Gls)
- Necaxa

International career
1930–38	Mexico	7	(3)
Medal record
Representing Mexico
Men's Football
Central American and Caribbean Games
Gold medal – first place	1935 El Salvador	Team competition
Gold medal – first place	1938 Panama	Team competition
- * Club domestic league appearances and goals

Luis Pérez González (25 August 1906– 28 May 1963) was a Mexican football forward who made two appearances for the Mexico national team at the 1930 FIFA World Cup.

== Honours ==
International

- Central American and Caribbean Games Gold Medal (2): 1935, 1938
