= Hilario López =

Mexican footballer (1907-1965)

Personal information
- Full name: Hilario López García
- Date of birth: 18 November 1907
- Place of birth: Guadalajara, Mexico
- Date of death: 23 January 1987 (aged 79)
- Position: Forward

Senior career*
Years	Team	Apps	(Gls)
1919–1927	Nacional		
1927–1930	Marte		
1930–1939	Necaxa		

International career
1930–1935	Mexico	8	(9)
Medal record
Representing Mexico
Men's Football
Central American and Caribbean Games
Gold medal – first place	1935 El Salvador	Team competition
- * Club domestic league appearances and goals

Hilario López García (18 November 1907 – 17 June 1965) was a Mexican football forward who made three appearances for the Mexico at the 1930 FIFA World Cup.

== Honours ==
Mexico

- Central American and Caribbean Games: 1935

Individual

- Central American and Caribbean Games Top Scorer: 1935
