= Julio Lores =

Peruvian-Mexican footballer (1908-1947)

Personal information
- Full name: Julio Lores Colán
- Date of birth: 15 September 1908
- Place of birth: Huaral, Peru
- Date of death: 15 July 1947 (aged 38)
- Place of death: Unknown
- Position: Forward

Senior career*
Years	Team	Apps	(Gls)
1928–1929	Ciclista Lima		
1929–1938	Necaxa		

International career
1930	Peru	2	(0)
1935–1938	Mexico	7	(6)
Medal record
Representing Mexico
Men's Football
Central American and Caribbean Games
Gold medal – first place	1935 El Salvador	Team competition
Gold medal – first place	1938 Panama	Team competition
- * Club domestic league appearances and goals

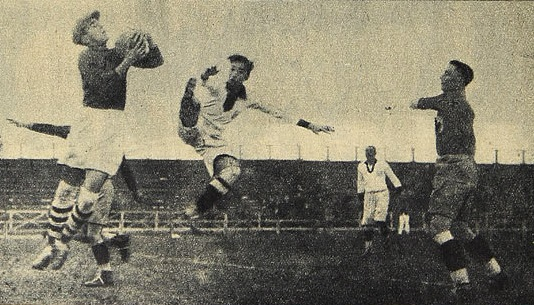
Romanian goalkeeper Lapusneanu faces Peruvian striker Lores during the match between the two teams in the 1930 World Cup.

Julio Lores Colán (born 15 September 1908 - death 15 July 1947) was a Peruvian-Mexican professional football forward who played for Peru in the 1930 FIFA World Cup and for Mexico. He played for Ciclista Lima, and later for the Mexican club Necaxa. He also was part of “Los Once Hermanos” (“The Eleven Brothers”).

== Honours ==
International

- Central American and Caribbean Games Gold Medal: 1935, 1938
