= Gustavo Marroquín =

Salvadoran footballer (born 1943)

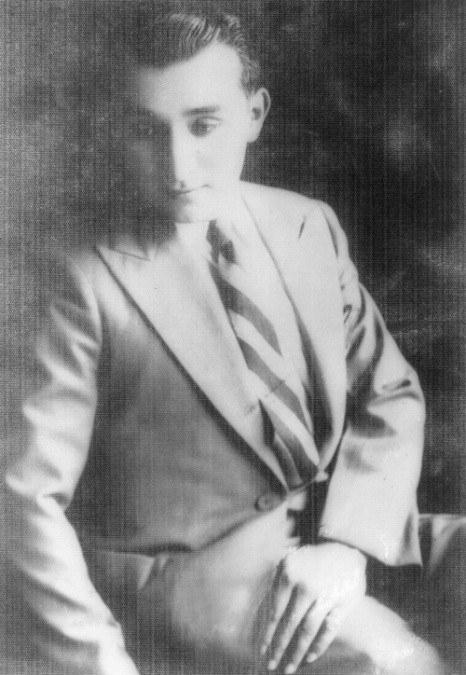
- Marroquín in 1928

Personal information
- Place of birth: El Salvador
- Date of death: 27 March 1943
- Place of death: San Salvador, El Salvador
- Position: Striker

Senior career*
Years	Team	Apps	(Gls)
- Fortuna SC

International career
1928–1930	El Salvador	6	(13)
- * Club domestic league appearances and goals

Gustavo "Taviche" Marroquín (died 27 March 1943) was a Salvadoran footballer who played as a striker for the El Salvador national team from 1928 to 1930.

== Club career ==
Marroquín played for the American football club Fortuna SC.

== International career ==
Marroquín scored the first five goals in the history of the El Salvador national football team during a friendly match against Honduras on 7 December 1928, earning El Salvador's first ever international victory in a match that ended 5–0.

=== International goals ===
Scores and results list El Salvador's goal tally first.

No.	Date	Venue	Opponent	Score	Result	Competition
1.	7 December 1928	Campo de Marte, San Salvador, El Salvador	Honduras	1–0	5–0	Friendly
2.	7 December 1928	Campo de Marte, San Salvador, El Salvador	Honduras	2–0	5–0	Friendly
3.	7 December 1928	Campo de Marte, San Salvador, El Salvador	Honduras	3–0	5–0	Friendly
4.	7 December 1928	Campo de Marte, San Salvador, El Salvador	Honduras	4–0	5–0	Friendly
5.	7 December 1928	Campo de Marte, San Salvador, El Salvador	Honduras	5–0	5–0	Friendly
6.	1 May 1929	Campo de Marte, San Salvador, El Salvador	Nicaragua	?–0	9–0	Friendly
7.	1 May 1929	Campo de Marte, San Salvador, El Salvador	Nicaragua	?–0	9–0	Friendly
8.	19 March 1930	La Tropical, Havana, Cuba	Guatemala	1–0	8–2	1930 CAC Games 1st Round Group B
9.	19 March 1930	La Tropical, Havana, Cuba	Guatemala	2–0	8–2	1930 CAC Games 1st Round Group B
10.	19 March 1930	La Tropical, Havana, Cuba	Guatemala	7–2	8–2	1930 CAC Games 1st Round Group B
11.	22 March 1930	La Tropical, Havana, Cuba	Costa Rica	2–?	2–9	1930 CAC Games 1st Round Group B
12.	29 March 1930	La Tropical, Havana, Cuba	Honduras	1–?	1–4	1930 CAC Games 2nd Round
13.	1 April 1930	La Tropical, Havana, Cuba	Cuba	2–?	2–5	1930 CAC Games 2nd Round

== See also ==
- El Salvador national football team
