= Alfred C. Crowle =

Mexican football manager (1899–1979)

Personal information
- Full name: Alfred Charles Crowle
- Date of birth: 30 November 1889
- Place of birth: Mexico City, Mexico
- Date of death: 27 August 1979 (aged 89)
- Place of death: Contra Costa, California, United States

Managerial career
- Years: Team
- 1917–20: C.F. Pachuca
- Club Necaxa
- 1935: Mexico

Alfred Charles Crowle (surname rhymes with roll like Kroll) (30 November 1889 – 27 August 1979) was a Mexican technical director to the Mexico national team. Born in Mexico, he was the son of tin miner Alfred Crowle (born in St. Blazey Gate, Cornwall) and Eugenia Augusta Leonora Shaw.

In 1935 he led Mexico to their first international competition trophy win, the football tournament at the Central American and Caribbean Games tournament.

== Cornish miners bringing football to Mexico ==
In 1900, the then President of Mexico, Gen. Porfirio Díaz, awarded mining concessions to British mining companies. Cornish miners working in the mines of Pachuca and Real Del Monte practised football as a pastime in their spare time to form the Pachuca Football Club and later renamed as Pachuca Athletic Club, historically it is considered the first organized amateur football club in Mexico, then came Orizaba Athletic Club, Reforma Athletic Club, British Club and Mexico Cricket Club, among others.

The other main drivers of this sport were Mr. Percy Clifford and Mr. Robert J. Blackmoore who, together with Crowle, brought the rules of the game and the first regulated matches. Pachuca Athletic Club was the champion of the newly formed amateur league, under Crowle.
