= Rafael Ángel Madrigal =

Costa Rican footballer (1902-1985)

Rafael Madrigal
Personal information
- Full name: Rafael Ángel Madrigal Aguirre
- Date of birth: 4 November 1902
- Place of birth: San José, Costa Rica
- Date of death: 17 July 1985 (aged 82)
- Place of death: San José, Costa Rica
- Position: Forward

Senior career*
| Years | Team | Apps | (Gls) |
| 1921–1937 | La Libertad | | |

International career
| 1921–1930 | Costa Rica | 7 | (17) |
- * Club domestic league appearances and goals

Rafael Ángel Madrigal Aguirre (4 November 1902 – 1985) was a Costa Rican footballer who represented the Costa Rica national football team between 1921 and 1930. He was nicknamed "Macho", and played for Costa Rican club La Libertad.

== Career statistics ==
=== International ===
Appearances and goals by national team and year
| National team | Year | Apps | Goals |
|---|---|---|---|
| Costa Rica | 1921 | 2 | 6 |
| Costa Rica | 1930 | 5 | 11 |
| Total | | 7 | 17 |

=== International goals ===
Scores and results list Costa Rica's goal tally first, score column indicates score after each Costa Rica goal.

List of international goals scored by Rafael Madrigal
| No. | Date | Venue | Opponent | Score | Result | Competition |
|---|---|---|---|---|---|---|
| 1 | 14 September 1921 | Campo de Marte, Guatemala City, Guatemala | El Salvador | ?–0 | 7–0 | Independence Centenary Games |
| 2 | 14 September 1921 | Campo de Marte, Guatemala City, Guatemala | El Salvador | ?–0 | 7–0 | Independence Centenary Games |
| 3 | 14 September 1921 | Campo de Marte, Guatemala City, Guatemala | El Salvador | ?–0 | 7–0 | Independence Centenary Games |
| 4 | 14 September 1921 | Campo de Marte, Guatemala City, Guatemala | El Salvador | ?–0 | 7–0 | Independence Centenary Games |
| 5 | 14 September 1921 | Campo de Marte, Guatemala City, Guatemala | Guatemala | ?–0 | 6–0 | Independence Centenary Games |
| 6 | 14 September 1921 | Campo de Marte, Guatemala City, Guatemala | Guatemala | ?–0 | 6–0 | Independence Centenary Games |
| 7 | 17 March 1930 | La Tropical, Havana, Cuba | Honduras | 1–? | 8–1 | 1930 Central American and Caribbean Games |
| 8 | 17 March 1930 | La Tropical, Havana, Cuba | Honduras | 2–? | 8–1 | 1930 Central American and Caribbean Games |
| 9 | 17 March 1930 | La Tropical, Havana, Cuba | Honduras | 5–? | 8–1 | 1930 Central American and Caribbean Games |
| 10 | 17 March 1930 | La Tropical, Havana, Cuba | Honduras | 6–? | 8–1 | 1930 Central American and Caribbean Games |
| 11 | 22 March 1930 | La Tropical, Havana, Cuba | El Salvador | ?–? | 9–2 | 1930 Central American and Caribbean Games |
| 12 | 22 March 1930 | La Tropical, Havana, Cuba | El Salvador | ?–? | 9–2 | 1930 Central American and Caribbean Games |
| 13 | 26 March 1930 | La Tropical, Havana, Cuba | El Salvador | 2–0 | 5–0 | 1930 Central American and Caribbean Games |
| 14 | 26 March 1930 | La Tropical, Havana, Cuba | El Salvador | ?–0 | 5–0 | 1930 Central American and Caribbean Games |
| 15 | 4 April 1930 | La Tropical, Havana, Cuba | Honduras | ?–0 | 8–0 | 1930 Central American and Caribbean Games |
| 16 | 4 April 1930 | La Tropical, Havana, Cuba | Honduras | ?–0 | 8–0 | 1930 Central American and Caribbean Games |
| 17 | 4 April 1930 | La Tropical, Havana, Cuba | Honduras | ?–0 | 8–0 | 1930 Central American and Caribbean Games |
