= Eladio Rosabal =

Costa Rican footballer (1894–1965)

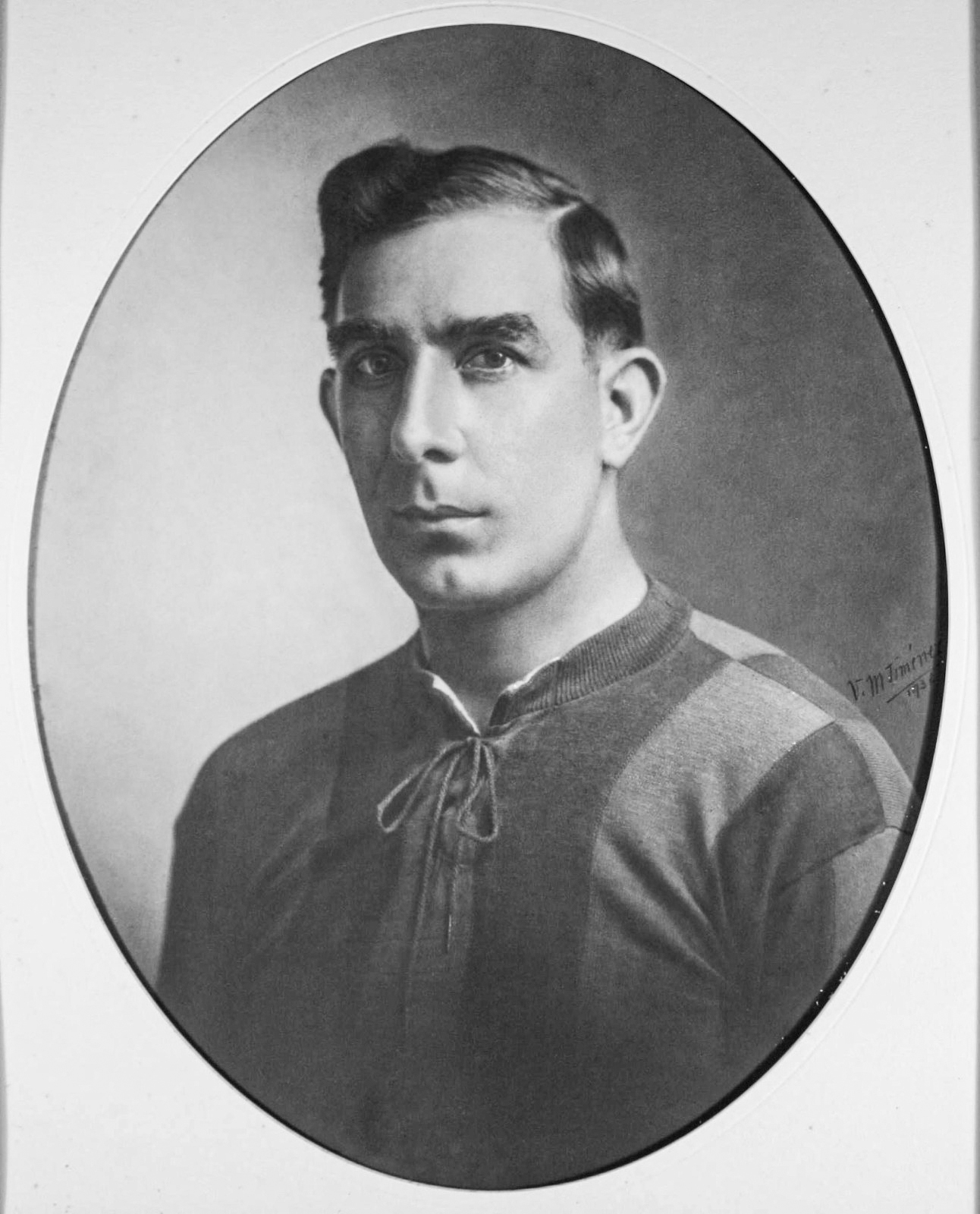

Personal information
- Full name: Eladio Rosabal Cordero
- Date of birth: 15 September 1894
- Place of birth: Heredia, Costa Rica
- Date of death: 26 April 1965 (aged 70)
- Place of death: Heredia, Costa Rica
- Position: Midfielder

Senior career*
Years	Team	Apps	(Gls)
1918–1921	Club La Libertad		
1921–1933	Herediano		

International career
	Costa Rica	2	

Managerial career
- 1921: Costa Rica
- * Club domestic league appearances and goals

Eladio Rosabal Cordero (15 September 1894 — 26 April 1965) was a Costa Rican footballer who was one of the top midfielders in the history of the Primera División de Costa Rica. He was one of the founders of the Costa Rican football club, Herediano.

== Club career ==
Rosabal began his football career with Club La Libertad, but left the club in 1921 to form Club Sport Herediano along with Joaquín Manuel "Toquita" Gutiérrez, Francisco "Paco" Fuentes and the brothers Gilberto "Beto" and Claudio "Cayito" Arguedas. Between 1921 and 1933, Rosabal Cordero played for Herediano and won eight Primera División de Costa Rica championships.

== International career ==
He was a captain of the Costa Rica national football team.

== Personal ==
Born in Heredia, Rosabal was the eldest of eight brothers and assumed responsibility for his family at age 21 following his father's death. He married Claudia Echeverría Flores, the daughter of writer and politician Aquileo J. Echeverría, and they had six children. He died from cancer in 1965.

Herediano's stadium is a memorial to him.
