= Hernán Bolaños =

Chilean footballer (1912-1992)

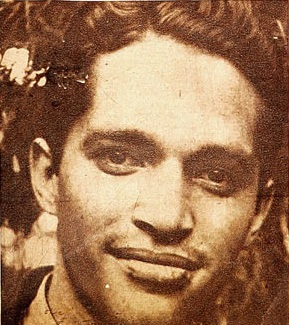
- Bolaños in 1946

Personal information
- Full name: Hernán Bolaños Ulloa
- Date of birth: 20 March 1912
- Place of birth: Granada, Nicaragua
- Date of death: 9 May 1992 (aged 80)
- Place of death: San José, Costa Rica
- Position: Forward

Senior career*
Years	Team	Apps	(Gls)
- UCR Fútbol Club
- Orión F.C.
1930–1935	Alajuelense		
1936–1947	Audax Italiano		
1940	→ Universidad de Chile (loan)		
1940	→ Universidad Católica (loan)		

International career
1930–1938	Costa Rica	9	(9)
1940	Chile	3	(0)

Managerial career
- 1946–1948: Costa Rica
Medal record
Representing Costa Rica
Men's Football
Central American and Caribbean Games
Silver medal – second place	1930 Cuba	Team competition
Silver medal – second place	1938 Panama	Team competition
- * Club domestic league appearances and goals

Hernán Bolaños Ulloa (20 March 1912 – 9 May 1992) was a football player and manager. He played as a forward. Born in Nicaragua, he represented Costa Rica and Chile internationally.

== Early life ==
Bolaños was born in Granada, Nicaragua.

== Club career ==
He joined Alajuelense in 1930 and played for Audax Italiano, Universidad de Chile and Universidad Católica in Chile. He played for Audax Italiano alongside his twin brother, Óscar, and they were nicknamed Los hermanos del Diablo (The Devil's brothers) by the Chilean press.

== International career ==
Bolaños played for Costa Rica appearing in nine occasions recording nine goals, in 1940 he played for Chile at the Copa Roca – loss by 2–3 against Argentina – in Buenos Aires and at the Copa Presidente Aguirre Cerda – loss by 2–3 against Uruguay – in Montevideo.

== Retirement ==
Bolaños studied dentistry at the University of Chile and became the Costa Rica ambassador to Chile.

== Honours ==
=== Player ===
Audax Italiano

- Chilean Primera División: 1936

Costa Rica

- Central American and Caribbean Games Silver Medal: 1930, 1938

Individual

- Chilean Primera División top goalscorer: 1936, 1937

=== Manager ===
Costa Rica

- CCCF Championship: 1946, 1948
