= Armando Chacón =

Salvadoran footballer and manager

Personal information
- Full name: Armando Chacón
- Date of birth: 7 August 1914
- Place of birth: El Salvador
- Date of death: 1983 (aged 68–69)
- Position: Midfielder

Senior career*
Years	Team	Apps	(Gls)
1934–1935	Cuscatlán		
1936–1939	C.D. 33		
1940–1946	Universidad Católica		

International career
1935	El Salvador		

Managerial career
- 1947–1949: C.D. FAS
- 1949–1950: Once Municipal
- 1954: C.D. Dragón
- Leones de Sonsonate
Medal record
Representing El Salvador
Men's Football
Central American and Caribbean Games
Bronze medal – third place	1935 El Salvador	Team competition
- * Club domestic league appearances and goals

Armando Chacón (7 August 1914 – ?) was a Salvadoran football player and manager. He is the father of former FAS, Atlético Marte and Sonsonate midfielder in the 1960s, Armando Chacón, and is often referred to as "Armando Chacón Senior" when there is a chance of confusion between the two.

== Club career ==
Nicknamed El Tamarindo, he was one of the first Salvadoran players to play abroad, playing for Universidad Católica in Chile. He also played club football for the now defunct C.D. 33 in the Primera División de Fútbol de El Salvador winning the 1937 and 1938 league titles with them.

== International career ==
On March 28, 1935 he made his international debut in El Salvador's second group stage match at the 1935 Central American Games against Honduras, where he also got his first goal, scoring the third in a 3-4 loss. Chacon scored goals for the El Salvador national football team from 1935 to 1943. He represented his country at the 1935 Central American Games.

== Manager career ==
After retiring as a player Chacón became a coach, he was the first ever coach of Salvadoran powerhouse club C.D. FAS and also coached C.D. Dragón. He went on to win a title with Once Municipal in the 1948/1949 season, the club's first title and up until 2006 their only one.

== Honours ==
International

- Central American and Caribbean Games Bronze Medal (1): 1935
