= Club Necaxa =

Association football club in Mexico

Necaxa
- Full name: Impulsora del Deportivo Necaxa S.A. de C.V.
- Nicknames: Los Rayos (The Lightning); Los Electricistas (The Electricians); Los Once Hermanos (The Eleven Brothers)
- Short name: NEC
- Founded: 21 August 1923; 103 years ago
- Ground: Estadio Victoria
- Capacity: 23,000
- Owner(s): NX Football USA LLC (50%); Inmosan (50%)
- Chairman: Ernesto Tinajero Flores
- Head coach: Juan Reynoso
- League: Liga MX
- Clausura 2026: Regular phase: 15th of 18; Final phase: Did not qualify
- Website: clubnecaxa.mx
Home colours	Away colours	Third colours

Impulsora del Deportivo Necaxa S.A. de C.V., also known as Club Necaxa, is a professional football club based in Aguascalientes. The club competes in Liga MX, the top division of Mexican football, and plays its home matches at Estadio Victoria. Founded in 1923 by the Scottish engineer William H. Fraser in Mexico City, and later the club was moved to Aguascalientes in 2003. It was one of ten founding members of the professional era of the Liga Mayor (current Liga MX).

Domestically, Club Necaxa has won three Liga MX titles, four Copa MX titles, two Campeón de Campeones and one Supercopa MX. Internationally, it has won one CONCACAF Champions Cup and one CONCACAF Cup Winners Cup. The club finished in third place in the 2000 FIFA Club World Championship.

It occupies 7th place in the list of the International Federation of Football History and Statistics of the Club of the Century of North and Central America (1901–2000), being the best-placed Mexican club.

== History ==
=== Foundation (Light and Power Company, Luz y Fuerza) (1899–1920) ===
Necaxa was founded on 21 August 1923, by Scotsman William H. Fraser, an engineer and owner of the Light and Power Company (Compañía de Luz y Fuerza) in the state of Puebla. As a student in Scotland, Fraser played football and was a strong advocate for the sport. Fraser consolidated the teams of the Light and Power Company and the Street Car operators Compañia de Luz y Fuerza and Tranvías into one.

Fraser supported the newly merged team with company revenue and funds. In addition, the Light and Power Company offered steady employment to players in an era where half of the players were playing at an amateur level. However, the Mexican football federation did not allow teams to be named after private companies, so the team changed its name to Necaxa, after the Necaxa River that was close to the electrical plant.

Historians assert that Necaxa's colors and crest came from following the arrival of the Cornish community in Mexico; the Cornish community flourished and stayed in Central Mexico until the Mexican Revolution in 1910. Although the Cornish community in Mexico broadly returned to Cornwall, they left a cultural legacy; Cornish pasties, Cornish mining museums, a Cornish Mexican Cultural Society and football are part of the local heritage and tradition in and around Mineral del Monte. In 1923, it was decided that Necaxa would field players regardless of race and nationality.

In that era, the team was called "Los Electricistas" (The Electricians). The team adopted red and white as their team colors, earning them the nickname "Los roji-blancos". During this period, the oldest rivalry in Mexican football began to form, between Necaxa and Atlante F.C.

On September 14, 1930, having already been a two-time champion of the amateur Copa Eliminatoria, Necaxa inaugurated its stadium Parque Necaxa, located on the banks of La Piedad River on land donated by the Fraser Family. The stadium had a maximum capacity for 15,000 fans, and was known for its clock tower displaying the team's emblem.

Necaxa, in the early days of Mexican Football were members of the Mexican Amateur Association Football League Liga Mexicana de Fútbol Amateur Association, composed of Atlante, Club España, Germania FV, and seasoned and disciplined team Asturias. Necaxa won championships during the 1932–33, 1934–35, 1936–37, and 1937–38 seasons.

The following season after the stadium's opening, players such as Hilario López and Luis Pérez contributed to the team's success, leading Necaxa to the League final against Atlante, losing 3–2.

But Necaxa would rebound the next season, smashing Atlante by a 9–0 score. The lineup Necaxa used on that day was:

Mexico

- (Mexico) José Ruíz
- (Mexico) Raul Chávez
- (Mexico) Garfias
- (Mexico) Conception Pérez
- (Mexico) Marures
- (Mexico) Luis "Pichojos" Pérez
- (Mexico) Roberto Jardón

Foreign

- (Peru) Julio "Chino" Lores
- (England) A. Lonergan
- (England) Alfred Crowle

During this decade, Necaxa became one of the most popular teams in Mexico. Under the direction of the Ernst Pauler, Necaxa, in one season of play (1935–36), the team dominated and won titles ranging from Champion of Champions, Champion of the Liga Mayor De La Ciudad, National Champion of League, National Champion and Central American Champions. Their last title was the Central American Championship in El Salvador.

1935 Caribbean games lineup

Mexico

- (Mexico) Raúl "Pipiolo" Estrada
- (Mexico) Alfonso Riestra
- (Mexico) Antonio "Toño" Azpiri
- (Mexico) Lorenzo "Abuelo" Camarena
- (Mexico) Miguel Pizano
- (Mexico) Guillermo "Perro" Ortega
- (Mexico) Ignacio "Calavera" Avila

- (Mexico) Felipe "Diente" Rosas
- (Mexico) Vidal "Chamaco" García
- (Mexico) Tomás "Poeta" Lozano
- (Mexico) Hilario "Moco" López
- (Peru) Julio "Chino" Lores
- (Mexico) Luis "Pichojos" Pérez
- (Mexico) Luis García Cortina
- (England) Alfred Crowle

"Paco" Martinez de la Vega, an aficionado, would coin the surname for the first time "Campeonismo" or "Championshipism", which Necaxa would later use to justify their achievements and titles.

=== Late 1930s: Once Hermanos ===
Following the Mexican Revolution, the late 1930s represented Necaxa's most successful all-Mexican team. The Once Hermanos or "Eleven Brothers" period was coined in that era due to that team's ability to work as a team. The Necaxa team, in 1936, won the Copa México.

In that same year, a talented striker rose to fame on Nexcaxa's bench. Although he was not part of the original "Once Hermano" (Eleven Brothers), Horacio Casarín became a standout player in the Mexican national league. His massive success on the field eventually propelled him into the spotlight of Mexican Cinema.

Necaxa's "Once Hermanos" lineup

- (Mexico) Raúl "Pipiolo" Estrada
- (Mexico) Luis "Pichojos" Pérez
- (Mexico) Antonio "Toño" Aspiri
- (Mexico) Vidal "Chamaco" García
- (Mexico) Hilario "Moco" López
- (Mexico) Tomás "Poeta" Lozano

- (Mexico) Lorenzo "Abuelo" Camarena
- (Mexico) Ignacio "Calavera" Ávila
- (Mexico) Marcial "Ranchero" Ortiz
- (Mexico) Chino López
- (Mexico) Ivan Vázquez Morales
- (Mexico) Gerardo "Day" Madriz

=== 1940s brief hiatus ===
Necaxa disappears from competitive play within the Mexican League in 1943 altogether due to the professionalization of Mexican Football. It would be half a decade before the Necaxa emblem and uniform would be represented on the field again.

=== 1950-60s resurgence ===
Seven years later, Club Necaxa returned to play under the conditions of the commercialization of the Mexican league. Under the new ownership of the Union of Electricians and Juan Jose Rivas Rojas, Club Necaxa played their first game on 25 September 1950 in the old district of Oblatos, in a stadium called Parque Oblatos or "Oblatos Stadium" otherwise called the Municipal Stadium of Felipe Martinez Sandoval in Guadalajara, Jalisco. This park inaugurated Necaxa's comeback to football. In the fifties, Necaxa were tenants and played in the Federal District of Mexico City in present-day Estadio Azul (1950–55).

In the late sixties, Necaxa played football in Estadio Azteca in Mexico City. A modern lighting system in Estadio Azteca was inaugurated on 5 June 1966 with the first night game between Valencia CF and Necaxa. The first goal of the game was scored by Honduran José Cardona. In this game Roberto Martínez o Caña Brava scored the first goal made by a Mexican. Estadio Azteca was the largest stadium in Latin America, and the fifth largest stadium in the world. It is known throughout North America and South America as the home stadium for the Mexico national football team.

Throughout the 1950s Necaxa struggled financially to keep afloat. In 1955, large debts obliged Necaxa to sell the majority of its star players. Miguel Ramierz Vazquez a new owner, contracted the services of the Uruguayan coach Donald Ross, who eventually took Guadalajara to a championship 1957, beginning a road to stability, yet not winning championships.

The electricians won the Title cup in 1960 and the following year, in the Universidad Nacional Autonoma de Mexico Olympic stadium, "the electricians" defeated Rey Pele and the club and team of the Santos of Brazil 4–3 in an official match of that year's "Exagonal" tournament. "Morocho" Dante Juarez assisted in two victorious goals in Necaxa's win over the Santos de Brazil.

Through the early 1960s, Necaxa struggled financially until it was sold. New owners, Julio Orvañanos, brought a championship in 1965–66.

=== Mexico 68 and Carlos Albert vs. Necaxa ===
In this decade, the organization was in financial trouble. The team had poor attendance in Mexico City due to the population unrest.

The case of Carlos Albert begins with a small group of veteran footballers in the spring of 1969. Club Necaxa Veteran players petitioned the organization for better wages and argued that as a team and group, they have always responded to the team's performance. Carlos Albert was the face of the disagreement between the players and management.

Albert was listed by Necaxa Management as transferable and was retained on half his salary. He asked management to void his contract in order, to avoid loss of income and to be able to continue playing in the League with another team. Necaxa Management did not accept his request.

The courts ruled in favor of Albert on Thursday 8 October 1971, and Necaxa was forced to pay MX$77,000 to Carlos Albert. Due to the will of managements unfair psychological abuse and labour malpractice, This case forced a cause to action from several players to request better treatment and more rights for Necaxa football players.

=== Atlético Español (1971–1982) ===
On September 19, 1971, Club Necaxa experienced financial trouble and became in debt with players and management. The owners sold the club to a group of businessmen from Spain. The ownership handled the player contracts, disputes and the franchises debt. The new Spanish ownership restructured contracts and made Club Necaxa solvent. The club played under the name of the Spanish Athletic Bulls or "Toros del Atlético Español".

In 1975, the organization won their only international title in the CONCACAF Champions' Cup, playing the final against Transvaal of Suriname and defeating them 5–1 on aggregate. In 1973–74, they reached the final against Cruz Azul. They played a two-legged tie in which the Atlético Español won the first leg 2–1 but lost the second 3–0, becoming sub champion of the league.

Players who distinguished themselves in Atlético Español were the Brazilian striker Carlos Eloir Perucci, Ricardo Brandón, Salvador Plascencia,'Sabanita' Rivera, Juan Santillán, and Tomás Boy, under the direction of Miguel Marín, 'the Witch' Gutiérrez, Enrique Díaz and 'Chucho' Prado and the Chiliean Prieto.

In 1982, the Spanish ownership within the Federal District of Mexico City sold the franchise. A new group of Mexican businessmen purchased Necaxa in 1982, then telecommunications Giant Grupo Televisa returned the organization's original name from 1971 and opened its training facilities in Cuautitlán Izcalli in the state of Mexico. The ownership renamed the franchise Necaxa by 1982 after the cultural and historical importance of the franchise in Mexican football. While Mexico experienced a crisis called "the Lost Decade" or "La Decada Perdida" in the 1980s and early 1970s, Necaxa in the 1980s struggled against two relegation matches. One at the end of the 1982–83 season against Zacatepec and another by the end of the 1984–85 season against Leones Universidad de Guadalajara.

Atlético Español footballers: Goalkeepers: Julito Aguilar, Jan Gomola, Goyo Cortez, Enrique Vazquez del Mercado, Defense: El Pimienta Rico, Juan Manuel Alvarez, Mario Trejo, Midfielder: Juan Carlos Rodriguez Vega, Manuel Manzo, Benito Buen Hombre Pardo, Tomas Boy. Forwards: Juan Manuel Borbolla, Juan José Muñante, Romano, Carlos Eloir Perucci, El Cachito Ramirez, Ricardo Brandon, Pio Tabaré Gonzalez, Juan Carlos Rossete. Raúl 'El Cora Isiordia", y Alejandro Romanh.

=== New Owners and return to glory (1990–2000) ===
In 1988, Futbol Club Necaxa was purchased by Mexican telecommunications giant Grupo Televisa, S.A. de C.V. The now late owner, Emilio Azcárraga Milmo (father of Emilio Azcárraga Jean), and several associates took a new direction with the team.

In the 1989 and 1990 season, director of football operations Anibal Ruiz acquired the services of the Ecuadorian midfielder, Álex Aguinaga, one of the iconic figures of the Necaxa in the 1990s and one of the most talented foreign players who has ever set foot on Mexican soil.

Necaxa has a great season, previously in the 1980s they battled twice against México Primera División's regulations of the Mexican League. In that year Necaxa reached the finals losing to Pumas of the University of Mexico. The following season Aníbal Ruiz was replaced with new coach, the Argentine ex-defender, Eduardo Luján Manera who contracted the services of the Chilean Ivo Basay. Under Manera, Necaxa didn't qualify for the finals of the championship. The acquisition of new coach Roberto Saporiti, marked the beginning of a commitment to competition excellence in a period known to Necaxa fans as "La Epoca Necaxista bajo el Capitalismo" or "the new era of Necaxa under Capitalism".

In 1992, the talented footballer of UNAM, ex-Puma player Enrique Borja was put under contract and headed the club's football operations, leaving Saporiti as head coach of Necaxa. Eventually Saporitti was replaced. The team Saporitti, Manera, Ruiz leave was an offensive minded team, that was disciplined, yet lacked great defensive talent. The following season management engaged the services of Manuel Lapuente. Sergio "El Ratón" Zarate, Octavio "Picas" Becerril, the Chilean Eduardo "Lalo" Vilches, José María "El Chema" Higareda were key figures in the defense and offense of the club. Manuel Lapuente managed Club Necaxa to three Championship titles in Mexico's National Football League.

After 56 years, once again Necaxa found itself with the title of "Campeonísimo", contributing talent in the 1990s and late in the millennium, within the Primera División of the Mexican League and in the Mexico national team.

They won the Mexican League Championship in 1994 (beating Cruz Azul), in 1995 (beating Celaya) and 1998 (beating Guadalajara), becoming Champion of CONCACAF, created a huge upset against European Giants Real Madrid CF in 3rd place match of the inaugural FIFA Club World Cup the following season. Champion of champions the legacy of the "Once Hermanos" attempted to be reestablished within the franchise's values and mind set. The Necaxa team of the 1990s had represented the cohesion and ability of working and playing as a team under lucrative financial incentives, forced great communication on the field and execution on the field during advanced Capitalism competition play. Necaxa's Championships were similar, yet different reminder of the spirit of "Los Once Hermanos" or "the Eleven Brothers" in the late 1930s.

=== Relocation and new home (2000–2009) ===
After poor attendance numbers during the early 2000s, Necaxa needed to refresh their home and relocate to improve on this issue. Many considered Estadio Victoria in Aguascalientes to be the first modern stadium built in Mexico.

Attendance continued to decline steadily despite the change of city and stadium for Necaxa. This consistent decline would lead to a relegation for Necaxa during the Spring 2009 campaign.

The Hidrorayos would bounce back winning the fall 2009 and Spring 2010 (undefeated) Ascenso MX titles thus earning an automatic promotion back up to the Liga MX.

=== Necaxa in Primera División and return to Ascenso MX (2011–present) ===
After winning the 2009–10 promotion, Necaxa returned to the FMF Primera División for the 2010–11 campaign. Omar Arellano began the season with Daniel Brailovsky taking over for the remainder of the tenure. Ultimately the club faced immediate relegation after only one year.

Despite having a good performance in the 2nd division, Necaxa was initially unable to return to the top flight, losing two finals in 2013 against Neza FC and Universidad de Guadalajara.

On 6 December 2014, Necaxa won the Apertura 2014 championship in the final game against Coras de Tepic ultimately losing the promotion play-off against Dorados de Sinaloa.

The Apertura 2015 tournament was not good for Necaxa, finishing in 10th place. However, in Clausura 2016, Necaxa finished the regular season as runner-up, one point behind U. de G. In the playoffs, Necaxa beat Correcaminos 2–1 in the Quarterfinals, Atlante 5–3 in the Semifinals, and Zacatecas 2–0 in the Finals to become champion. Next was a two-legged playoff series against Juárez, the Apertura 2015 champion. Necaxa won the first leg in Aguascalientes 1–0, and one week later in Ciudad Juárez 2–0, thus clinching its return to Primera División Liga MX for the first time in five years.

=== NX Football USA, LLC (2021–present) ===
Necaxa took in a 50% ownership partner named NX Football USA, LLC in 2021. The ownership group included former owners from Major League Soccer club D.C. United, former managers from Welsh football club Swansea City, and celebrities: Mexican-American actress Eva Longoria, former international football player Mesut Özil, former NBA basketball player Shawn Marion, MLB baseball player Justin Verlander, and Verlander's wife, American model Kate Upton. Necaxa's backers purchased 5% of Wrexham AFC in April 2024 and its owners Rob McElhenney and Ryan Reynolds, in turn, purchased a minority stake in Necaxa.

On 9 July 2024, a TV series was ordered with filming beginning on the same day. The series will be similar to Welcome to Wrexham.

== Sponsorship ==
Period	Kit manufacturer	Shirt partner
1922–23	No sponsors*	Mexican Light & Power Company, Ltd.
1922–23	No sponsors*	StreetCar Operators
1923–26	No sponsors*	
1926–36	No sponsors*	
1936–40	No sponsors*	
1950–70	To be determined*	
1971–82	To be determined	
1987–88	Adidas	Choco Milk
1989–92	Adidas	
1993–94	Adidas	Coca-Cola / Elf
1994–95	Adidas*	Coca-Cola / Elf
1995–96	Umbro*	Coca-Cola / Elf
1996–97	Umbro	Coca-Cola / AFORE Garante
1998 (Winter'98)	Umbro*	Coca-Cola
1999-00	EEscord	Coca-Cola
2000–01	EEscord	Coca-Cola/Sol
2001	EEscord	Masfresco / Victoria / Coca-Cola
2002	Atletica	Coca-Cola / Victoria
2003	Atletica	Bimbo / Victoria / Coca-Cola
2004	Atletica	Bimbo / Office Depot / Victoria
2005	Atletica	Visa / Leche San Marcos / Banamex / Corona
2006	Atletica	Visa / Seguros Argos SA de CV / Leche San Marcos / Corona / Banamex
2007–08	Atletica	Visa / Seguros Argos SA de CV / Leche San Marcos / Corona / Aeroméxico / Banamex / Cemex Monterrey / Caja Libertad
2008	Voit	Sabritas / Corona / Leche San Marcos
2009	Voit	Diversity Capital / Corona / Leche San Marcos
2009–10	Voit*	Caja Popular Mexicana / Corona / Seguros Argos
2010–11	Atletica	Caja Popular Mexicana / Corona / ETN / Pepsi / Rolcar / Bimbo
2011–12	Atletica	Futura/Leche San Marcos/Corona/Caja Popular Mexicana/SKY/Coca-Cola/Trucka/Rolcar/Agro depot
2012–13	Pirma	ETN/Leche San Marcos/Meson del Taco/Corona/Caja Popular Mexicana/SKY/Coca-Cola/Trucka/Rolcar/Agro depot
2013–14	Pirma	Aeroméxico/Coca-Cola/Corona/ETN/Leche San Marcos/Pizza Ola/Rolcar/SKY/Trucka/Oxxo Gas
2014-17	Umbro	Aeroméxico/Coca-Cola/Corona/ETN/Búfalo/Leche San Marcos/Pizza Ola/Rolcar/SKY/Trucka/Oxxo Gas
2017–20	Charly	Rolcar/Cavall Sport/Búfalo/Circle K/Coca-Cola/Mercedes-Benz/SKY/Mediotiempo
2020–23	Pirma	Rolcar/Stubhub/Sisolar/Mercedes-Benz/Mobil/L’Anqgel/Del Monte/Perdura/PlayDoIt
2023 – 2026	Charly	Rolcar/H-E-B/Electrolit/Sertifex/Perdura/epa!/Carl's Jr./PlayDoIt/ETN/J.M. Romo/Mobil/Coca-Cola/Salsa Huichol/Circle K/Welch's/Megacable/Nissan/Grupo San Cristóbal/ViX/Quesos Bionda/Boletomóvil/Sisolar/BrandMe/Ciudad Madera Terrenos y Casa Premium/
2026 - present	Voit	Rolcar/PlayDoIt/Perdura/BrandMe/Bait/Ciudad Madera Terrenos y Casa Premium

- Championship jerseys

=== First kit evolution ===
1922–1923	Second 1922–23	1922–23	1923–71	1971–81	1973–75	1972

=== 1990–present kit evolution ===
1992	1994	1995	1996	1999	2005	2011

== Honours ==
Domestic
Type	Competition	Titles	Seasons	Runners-up
Top level FMF	Liga MX	3	1994–95, 1995–96, Inv–1998	Inv–1996, Ver–1998, Ver–2002
Top level FMF	Copa MX	4	1959–60, 1965–66, 1994–95, Cla–2018	Cla–2016
Top level FMF	Campeón de Campeones	2	1966, 1995	1960
Top level FMF	Supercopa MX	1^{s}	2018	2019
Lower levels FMF	Ascenso MX	4^{s}	Ape–2009, Bic–2010, Ape–2014, Cla–2016	Ape–2012, Cla–2013
Lower levels FMF	Campeón de Ascenso	2^{s}	2010, 2016	2015
International
Type	Competition	Titles	Seasons	Runners-up
CONCACAF Continental	CONCACAF Champions Cup	1	1999	1996
CONCACAF Continental	CONCACAF Cup Winners Cup	1^{s}	1994	—

Notes

- record
- ^{s} shared record

== International record ==
Season	Competition	Round	Club	Home	Away	Aggregate
1994	CONCACAF Cup Winners Cup	Quarter-final	(United States) CD México	5–1		
1994	CONCACAF Cup Winners Cup	Semi-final	(Barbados) Lambada	4–1		
1994	CONCACAF Cup Winners Cup	Final	(Guatemala) Aurora	3–0		
1996	CONCACAF Champions' Cup	Second round	(Costa Rica) Saprissa	2–2	2–1	4–3
1996	CONCACAF Champions' Cup	Final group stage	(Mexico) Cruz Azul	1–1		2nd
1996	CONCACAF Champions' Cup	Final group stage	(United States) Seattle Sounders	4–1		2nd
1996	CONCACAF Champions' Cup	Final group stage	(Guatemala) Comunicaciones	3–3		2nd
1997	CONCACAF Cup Winners Cup	Group north	(Mexico) Cruz Azul	1–1		1st
1997	CONCACAF Cup Winners Cup	Group north	(United States) Dallas Burn	4–1		1st
1997	CONCACAF Cup Winners Cup	Final	(Honduras) Olimpia	Cancelled^{1}		
1999	CONCACAF Champions' Cup	Qualifying playoff	(United States) LA Galaxy	1–1 (4–3 p)		
1999	CONCACAF Champions' Cup	Quarter-finals	(Costa Rica) Saprissa	3–2		
1999	CONCACAF Champions' Cup	Semi-finals	(United States) D.C. United	3–1		
1999	CONCACAF Champions' Cup	Final	(Costa Rica) Alajuelense	2–1		
2000	FIFA Club World Championship	Group B	(England) Manchester United	1–1		2nd
2000	FIFA Club World Championship	Group B	(Australia) South Melbourne	3–1		2nd
2000	FIFA Club World Championship	Group B	(Brazil) Vasco da Gama	1–2		2nd
2000	FIFA Club World Championship	Third place	(Spain) Real Madrid	1–1 (4–3 p)		
2000	Copa Merconorte	Group B	(Colombia) Atlético Nacional	2–1	0–0	3rd
2000	Copa Merconorte	Group B	(Costa Rica) Alajuelense	1–1	2–2	3rd
2000	Copa Merconorte	Group B	(Peru) Alianza Lima	0–0	0–1	3rd
2001	Copa Merconorte	Group A	(Ecuador) Aucas	1–3	2–0	1st
2001	Copa Merconorte	Group A	(Colombia) América de Cali	1–0	3–1	1st
2001	Copa Merconorte	Group A	(Peru) Alianza Lima	2–1	3–0	1st
2001	Copa Merconorte	Semi-finals	(Colombia) Millonarios	3–2	2–3	5–5 (1–3 p)
2003	CONCACAF Champions' Cup	Round of 16	(Jamaica) Arnett Gardens	1–0	0–0	1–0
2003	CONCACAF Champions' Cup	Quarter-finals	(United States) LA Galaxy	2–1	4–1	6–2
2003	CONCACAF Champions' Cup	Semi-finals	(Mexico) Morelia	0–0	0–6	0–6
2007	Copa Libertadores	Group 2	(Peru) Alianza Lima	2–0	2–1	1st
2007	Copa Libertadores	Group 2	(Chile) Audax Italiano	2–0	1–2	1st
2007	Copa Libertadores	Group 2	(Brazil) São Paulo	2–1	0–3	1st
2007	Copa Libertadores	Round of 16	(Uruguay) Nacional	0–1	2–3	2–4
2023	Leagues Cup	South 4	(United States) FC Dallas	0–3		3rd
2023	Leagues Cup	South 4	(United States) Charlotte FC	1–4		3rd
2024	Leagues Cup	West 6	(United States) Minnesota United FC	0–1		1st
2024	Leagues Cup	West 6	(United States) Seattle Sounders FC	3–1		1st
2024	Leagues Cup	Round of 32	(United States) San Jose Earthquakes	0–5		
2025	Leagues Cup	League Phase	(United States) Atlanta United FC	3–1		11th
2025	Leagues Cup	League Phase	(United States) Inter Miami CF	2–2 (4–5 p)		11th
2025	Leagues Cup	League Phase	(United States) Orlando City SC	1–5		11th

^{1} Final never played, tournament tacitly abandoned.

== Personnel ==
=== Management ===
Position	Staff
Chairman	(Mexico) Ernesto Tinajero Flores
General Director	(Mexico) Santiago Tinajero
Director of football	(Mexico) José Hanan Menendez
Coordinator of football	(Mexico) Alberto Clark
Director of academy	(Mexico) José María Padilla

Source: Liga MX

=== Coaching staff ===
Position	Staff
Manager	(Peru) Juan Reynoso
Assistant managers	(Peru) Pablo Zegarra (Mexico) Enrique Meza Jr. (Mexico) Rosalío Díaz
Goalkeeper coach	(Mexico) Ángel Maldonado
Fitness coaches	(Argentina) Walter Occhiato (Mexico) Juan Lozano
Physiotherapist	(Argentina) Rodrigo Menayed
Team doctor	(Mexico) Franco Vázquez
Doctor assistant	(Mexico) Julio Cambrón

== Players ==
=== First-team squad ===
As of 29 August 2026

Note: Flags indicate national team as defined under FIFA eligibility rules; some limited exceptions apply. Players may hold more than one non-FIFA nationality.

No.	Pos.	Nation	Player
1	GK	MEX	Christopher Andrade (on loan from Cancún)
2	DF	MEX	Emilio Martínez
3	DF	URU	Agustín Oliveros
4	DF	MEX	Alexis Peña
5	DF	BRA	Naves
6	MF	USA	Danny Leyva
7	MF	COL	Kevin Rosero
8	MF	ARG	Lorenzo Faravelli
9	FW	ARG	Julián Carranza
10	MF	ARG	Javier Ruiz
11	MF	COL	Juan Pablo Torres
12	GK	MEX	Luis Jiménez

No.	Pos.	Nation	Player
13	MF	MEX	Owen González (on loan from Pachuca)
14	DF	MEX	Mauro Zaleta (on loan from Cruz Azul)
15	DF	MEX	Diego Ochoa (on loan from Guadalajara)
16	MF	MEX	Pedro Pedraza (on loan from Pachuca)
17	FW	MEX	Rogelio Cortéz
20	DF	MEX	Francisco Méndez (on loan from Guadalajara)
21	MF	ARG	Matías Espíndola
27	FW	MEX	Misael Pedroza
33	DF	MEX	Raúl Martínez
88	DF	MEX	Carlos Vargas
90	FW	COL	Juan Valencia
99	MF	MEX	Emilio Rodríguez (on loan from Pachuca)

=== Youth squad ===
Note: Flags indicate national team as defined under FIFA eligibility rules; some limited exceptions apply. Players may hold more than one non-FIFA nationality.

No.	Pos.	Nation	Player
181	GK	MEX	Javier Orantes
188	MF	MEX	Israel Tello
208	DF	MEX	Leonardo Becerra

No.	Pos.	Nation	Player
210	MF	MEX	Joshua Palacios
235	DF	MEX	Leroy Davis
259	DF	MEX	Leonardo Arvizo

=== Out on loan ===
Note: Flags indicate national team as defined under FIFA eligibility rules; some limited exceptions apply. Players may hold more than one non-FIFA nationality.

No.	Pos.	Nation	Player
—	DF	MEX	Jesús Alcántar (at Melgar)
—	DF	MEX	Ricardo Alonso (at Tepatitlán)
—	DF	MEX	Bryan Casas (at Tepatitlán)

No.	Pos.	Nation	Player
—	DF	MEX	Alex Monárrez (at UAT)
—	MF	COL	Andrés Colorado (at Once Caldas)
—	MF	MEX	Waldo Madrid (at Querétaro)

== Champions squads ==
1994–95 Champions

- (Mexico) Nicolás Navarro
- (Mexico) José Maria Higareda
- (Mexico) Octavio Becerril
- (Mexico) Gerardo Esquível
- (Mexico) Ignacio Ambríz
- (Mexico) Luis Hernández
- (Mexico) Efraín Herrera
- (Mexico) Ricardo Peláez
- (Mexico) Alberto García Aspe
- (Chile) Eduardo Vilches
- (Ecuador) Álex Aguinaga
- (Argentina) Sergio Zárate
- (Chile) Ivo Basay
- (Mexico) Manuel Lapuente Coach
- Team bench roster and substitutes

1995–96 Champions

- (Mexico) Nicolás Navarro
- (Mexico) José Maria Higareda
- (Mexico) Octavio Becerril
- (Mexico) Gerardo Esquível
- (Mexico) Ignacio Ambríz
- (Mexico) Luis Hernández
- (Mexico) Efraín Herrera
- (Mexico) Ricardo Peláez
- (Mexico) Alberto García Aspe
- (Chile) Eduardo Vilches
- (Germany) Uwe Wolf
- (Ecuador) Álex Aguinaga
- (Argentina) Sergio Zárate
- (Mexico) Manuel Lapuente Coach
- Team bench roster and substitutes

Winter 98

- (Mexico) Adolfo Ríos
- (Mexico) José Maria Higareda
- (Mexico) Carlos Hermosillo
- (Uruguay) Sergio Vázquez
- (Mexico) Markus López
- (Mexico) José Manuel de la Torre
- (Mexico) Marco Antonio Sanchez
- (Mexico) Raul Gordillo
- (Mexico) Salvador Cabrera
- (Mexico) Sergio Almaguer
- (Mexico) Jose Luis Montes de Oca
- (Ecuador) Álex Aguinaga
- (Argentina) Sergio Zárate
- (Mexico) Raúl Arias Coach
- Team bench roster and substitutes

=== Top scorers ===
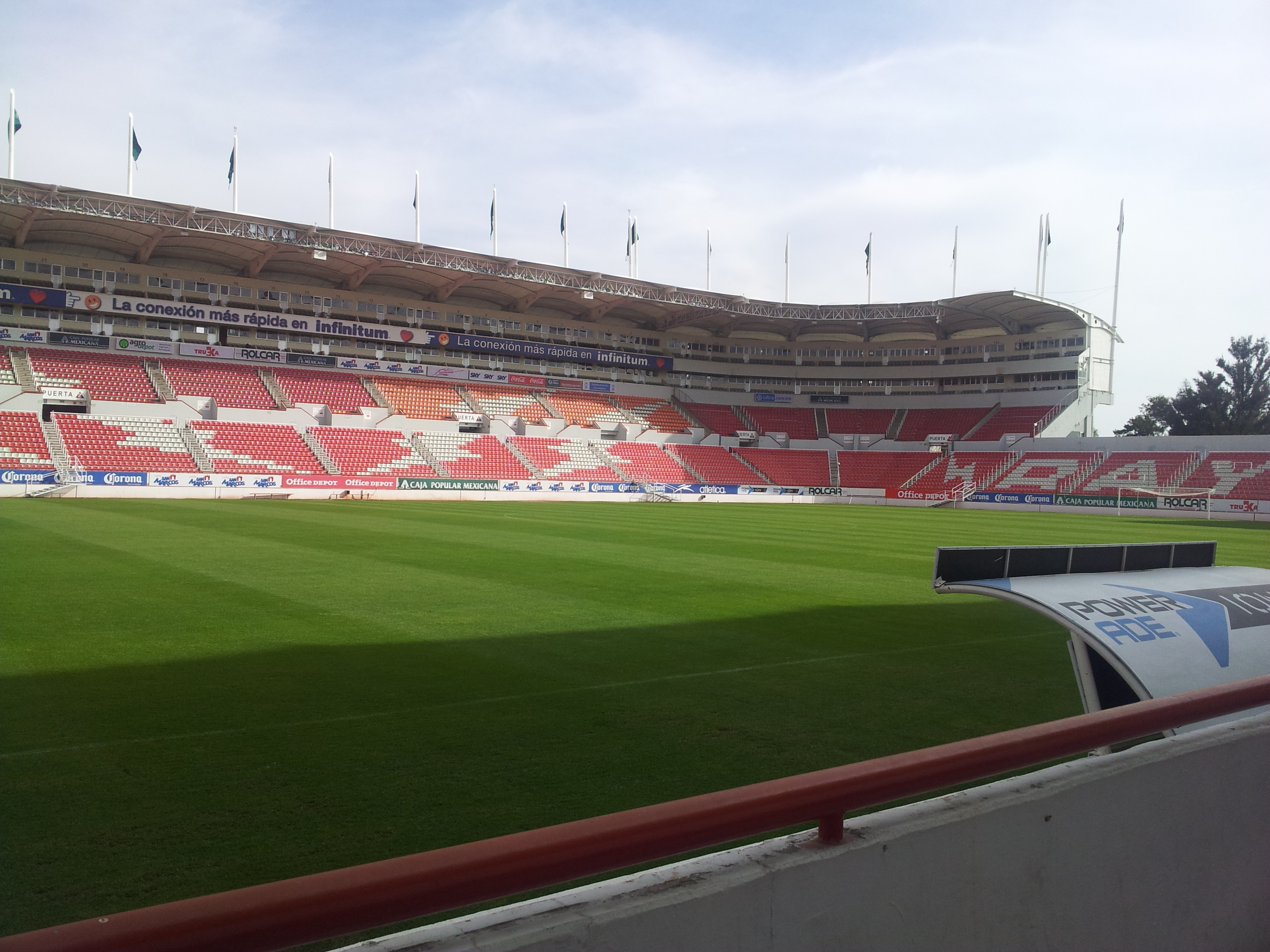
Interior of Victoria Stadium.

==== Historical Amateur leading scorers ====
- 1926–27 (Mexico) Miguel Ruiz (13 Goals)
- 1931–32 (Peru) Julio Lores (20 Goals)
- 1932–33 (Peru) Julio Lores (8 Goals)
- 1934–35 (Mexico) Hilario López (17 Goals)
- 1936–37 (Peru) Julio Lores (7 Goals)

==== Historical Leading Season scorers ====
- 1950–51 (Mexico) Horacio Casarín (17 Goals)
- 1952–53 (Peru) Tulio Quiñones (14 Goals)
- 1953–54 (Uruguay) Julio María Palleiro (21 Goals)
- 1954–55 (Uruguay) Julio María Palleiro (19 Goals)
- 1983–84 (Argentina) Norberto Outes (28 Goals)
- 1992–93 (Chile) Ivo Basay (27 Goals)
- Verano 2000 (Ecuador) Agustín Delgado (14 Goals)
- Apertura 2012 (Mexico) Víctor Lojero (11 Goals)
- Clausura 2013 (Mexico) Víctor Lojero (12 Goals)
- Apertura 2019 (Argentina) Mauro Quiroga (12 Goals)
- Clausura 2024 (Colombia) Diber Cambindo (8 Goals)

==== All-time leading scorers ====
Player	Goals	Nationality
Ricardo Peláez	138	(Mexico)
Ivo Basay	101	(Chile)
Víctor Lojero	86	(Mexico)
Álex Aguinaga	82	(Ecuador)
Alberto García Aspe	65	(Mexico)
Julio Maria Palleiro	64	(Uruguay)

== Managers ==
This is the list of managers who had the Club Necaxa in amateur and professional then short tournaments:

Name	Tournament	Led Games	Games Won	Tied Games	Games Lost
(Hungary) György Orth	1950-1951				
(Mexico) José Moncebáez	1969				
(Mexico) Alfonso Portugal	1979-1980				
(Mexico) Enrique Díaz	1982	16	2	7	7
(Peru) Walter Ormeño	1982–84	60	14	27	19
(Mexico) José Antonio Roca	1984–85	38	5	15	18
(Mexico) Mario Pérez	1986–87	40	7	24	9
(Paraguay) Cayetano Ré	1987–88	46	15	15	16
(Uruguay) Aníbal Ruiz	1988–90	70	24	28	18
(Argentina) Eduardo Luján Manera	1990–91	38	12	11	15
(Argentina) Roberto Saporiti	1991–94	121	52	39	30
(Mexico) Manuel Lapuente	1994–95 – Inverno 97	61	26	15	20
(Mexico) Raul Arias	Verano 98 – Clausura 2005	297	120	76	101
(Mexico) Enrique López Zarza	Apertura 2005 – Apertura 2006	45	16	10	19
(Mexico) Pablo Luna	Apertura 2006	1	0	1	0
(Mexico) Hugo Sanchez	Apertura 2006	7	2	1	4
(Mexico) Jose Luis Trejo	Clausura 2007	17	4	6	7
(Netherlands) Hans Westerhof	Apertura 2007	17	5	5	7
(Mexico) Salvador Reyes	Clausura 2008 – Apertura 2008	33	6	18	9
(Mexico) Octavio Becerril	Apertura 2008	5	2	2	1
(Mexico) Raul Arias	Clausura 2009	17	3	5	9
(Mexico) Omar Arellano Nuño	Apertura 2009 – Bicentenario 2010	44	22	17	5
(Argentina) Daniel Brailovsky	Apertura 2010 – Clausura 2011	15	3	1	11
(Mexico) Sergio Bueno	Clausura 2011	13	3	6	4
(Mexico) Paco Ramírez	Apertura 2011	12	5	4	3
(Mexico) Luis Francisco García Llamas	Apertura 2011	3	1	1	1
(Brazil) Tita	Clausura 2012	12	8	3	3
(Mexico) Jaime Ordiales	Apertura 2012 – Apertura 2013	28	14	10	4
(Mexico) Armando González	Apertura 2013 – Clausura 2014	38	18	12	8
(Mexico) Miguel de Jesús Fuentes	Apertura 2014 – 2015	36	15	9	12
(Mexico) Alfonso Sosa	2015–2017	38	19	13	6
(Mexico) Ignacio Ambríz	2017–2018	47	18	18	11
(Mexico) Marcelo Michel Leaño	2018	13	3	3	7
(Mexico) Guillermo Vázquez	2018–2019	50	21	11	18
(Mexico) Alfonso Sosa	2020	16	4	4	8
(Mexico) José Guadalupe Cruz	2020–2021	21	6	5	9
(Argentina) Pablo Guede	2021–2022	10	3	2	5
(Mexico) Jaime Lozano	2022	32	11	7	14
(Argentina) Andrés Lillini	2023	17	3	5	9
(Venezuela) Rafael Dudamel	2023	6	0	2	4
(Mexico) Eduardo Fentanes	2023–2024	46	15	13	18
(Argentina) Nicolás Larcamón	2025	19	10	3	6
(Argentina) Fernando Gago	2025	20	5	6	9
(Uruguay) Martín Varini	2026–Present	20	7	3	10

== Reserves ==
=== Kilowatitos del Nuevo Necaxa ===
The team participated in the Tercera División, finishing as runners-up in the 1972–73 season.

=== Club Deportivo Chalco ===
The team participated in the Tercera División, finishing as runners-up in the 1994–95 season.

=== Necaxa Rayos ===
The team participated in the Segunda División, finishing as runners-up in the Clausura 2007.

=== Necaxa Premier ===
The team participated in the Torneo de Filiales de la Liga Premier for affiliate teams of Liga MX clubs, finishing as champions in the Clausura 2018.

=== Necaxa "TDP" ===
The team competes in the Torneo de Filiales de la Liga TDP for affiliate teams of clubs from higher divisions.

== Fan clubs ==
- Sobredosis Albirroja "The Red and White Overdose"
- Comando Rojiblanco
- La Popular
- Pasión Albirroja

== See also ==
- Club Necaxa (women)
- Club Necaxa Premier
