= Football at the 1930 Central American and Caribbean Games =

Tournament details
- Host country: Cuba
- Dates: 16 March – 4 April
- Teams: 6 (from 1 confederation)
- Venue: 1 (in 1 host city)

Final positions
- Champions: Cuba (1st title)
- Runners-up: Costa Rica
- Third place: Honduras
- Fourth place: El Salvador

Tournament statistics
- Matches played: 12
- Goals scored: 83 (6.92 per match)
- Top scorer: (Costa Rica) Rafael Madrigal (11 goals)

The football tournament at the 1930 Central American and Caribbean Games was held in Havana from 16 March to 4 April.

The gold medal was won by Cuba who won the Second Stage with 9 points.

== Participants ==
- Costa Rica
- Cuba (Hosts)
- El Salvador
- Guatemala
- Honduras
- Jamaica

== First stage ==
Group winners and runners-up advanced to the second stage. 3-2-1 points system used.

=== Group A ===
Team	Pld	W	D	L	GF	GA	GD	Pts	Qualification
Cuba (A)	2	2	0	0	10	1	+9	6	Second stage
Honduras (A)	2	1	0	1	5	11	−6	4	Second stage
Jamaica	2	0	0	2	5	8	−3	2	Eliminated

(A) Advance to a further round
16 March 1930

Cuba	3–1	Jamaica
López 25', 46'; Valdés ?'		Cawley ?'

La Tropical, Havana
Referee: Salvador González (Costa Rica)

18 March 1930

Honduras	5–4	Jamaica
Raudales ?', ?'; Bustillo ?', ?', ?'		Vernon ?'; McKenzie ?'; Sasso ?'; Crunchley ?'

La Tropical, Havana
Referee: Conrado González (Cuba)

20 March 1930

Cuba	7–0	Honduras
López 7', 15', ?'; Rosillo 37', ?', ?'; Valdés ?'

La Tropical, Havana
Referee: Salvador González (Costa Rica)

=== Group B ===
Team	Pld	W	D	L	GF	GA	GD	Pts	Qualification
Costa Rica (A)	2	2	0	0	17	3	+14	6	Second stage
El Salvador (A)	2	1	0	1	10	11	−1	4	Second stage
Guatemala	2	0	0	2	3	16	−13	2	Eliminated

(A) Advance to a further round
17 March 1930

Costa Rica	8–1	Guatemala
Madrigal 10', 16' (pen.), 43', 78'; Solera 30'; Soto 35', 82'; Fonseca 80'	Report	Sandoval ?'

La Tropical, Havana
Referee: Herbert McDonald (Jamaica)

19 March 1930

El Salvador	8–2	Guatemala
Marroquín 2', 10', 62'; Calvo 13', 35', 40'; Herrera 44'; Tirello 77'	Report	Batres 20', 57'

La Tropical, Havana
Referee: Jesús Hermo (Cuba)

22 March 1930

Costa Rica	9–2	El Salvador
Bolaños ?', ?', ?'; Madrigal ?', ?'; Morales ?', ?'; Solera ?', ?'	Report	Tirello ?'; Marroquín ?'

La Tropical, Havana
Referee: Pablo Ferre (Spain)

== Second stage ==
Team	Pld	W	D	L	GF	GA	GD	Pts
Cuba (C)	3	3	0	0	12	3	+9	9
Costa Rica	3	2	0	1	14	2	+12	7
Honduras	3	1	0	2	4	14	−10	5
El Salvador	3	0	0	3	3	14	−11	3

(C) Champions
23 March 1930

Cuba	5–0	Honduras
Becerra 6', ?'; Ferrer 46', 48', ?'	Report

La Tropical, Havana
Referee: Salvador González (Costa Rica)

26 March 1930

Costa Rica	5–0	El Salvador
Bolaños 15', 55'; Madrigal 25', ?'; Solera ?'	Report

La Tropical, Havana
Referee: Conrado Morales (Cuba)

29 March 1930

El Salvador	1–4	Honduras
Marroquín ?' (pen.)	Report	Raudales ?'; Navarro ?', ?'; Talbott ?'

La Tropical, Havana
Referee: Jesús Hermo (Cuba)

30 March 1930

Cuba	2–1	Costa Rica
Martínez ?'; García ?'	Report	Morales ?'

La Tropical, Havana
Referee: Herbert McDonald (Jamaica)

1 April 1930

Cuba	5–2	El Salvador
Valdés ?', ?'; Martínez ?', ?'; Rosillo ?'	Report	Calvo ?' (pen.); Marroquín ?'

La Tropical, Havana
Referee: Conrado González (Cuba)

4 April 1930

Costa Rica	8–0	Honduras
Madrigal ?', ?', ?'; Serrano ?'; Morales ?', ?'; Soto ?', ?'	Report

La Tropical, Havana
Referee: Pablo Ferre (Spain)

1930 Central American
and Caribbean Games

Cuba
1st title

== Final ranking ==
Pos	Team	Pld	W	D	L	GF	GA	GD	Pts
1	Cuba (CUB)	5	5	0	0	22	4	+18	10
2	Costa Rica (CRC)	5	4	0	1	31	5	+26	8
3	Honduras (HON)	5	2	0	3	9	25	−16	4
4	El Salvador (SLV)	5	1	0	4	13	25	−12	2
5	Jamaica (JAM)	2	0	0	2	5	8	−3	0
6	Guatemala (GUA)	2	0	0	2	3	16	−13	0

== Statistics ==
=== Goalscorers ===
There were 83 goals scored in 12 matches, for an average of 6.92 goals per match.

11 goals

- (Costa Rica) Rafael Madrigal

6 goals

- (El Salvador) Gustavo Marroquín

5 goals

- (Costa Rica) Hernán Bolaños
- (Costa Rica) Braulio Morales
- (Cuba) López

4 goals

- (Costa Rica) Enrique Solera
- (Costa Rica) Salvador Soto
- (El Salvador) Mario Calvo

3 goals

- (Cuba) Enrique Ferrer
- (Cuba) Ángel Martínez
- (Cuba) Rolando Rosillo
- (Honduras) Daniel Bustillo
- (Honduras) Arístides Raudales

2 goals

- (Cuba) Gabriel Becerra
- (Cuba) Antero Valdés
- (Cuba) Antonio Valdés
- (El Salvador) Mario Tirello
- (Guatemala) Enrique Batres
- (Honduras) Lorenzo Navarro

1 goal

- (Costa Rica) José Joaquín Fonseca
- (Costa Rica) Antonio García
- (Costa Rica) Antonio Serrano
- (Cuba) Antonio Rosillo
- (El Salvador) Salvador Herrera
- (Guatemala) Hermógenes Sandoval
- (Honduras) Alex Talbott
- (Jamaica) Clifton Cawley
- (Jamaica) George Crunchley
- (Jamaica) Arthur McKenzie
- (Jamaica) Altament Sasso
- (Jamaica) Oswald Vernon
