= 1935 Central American and Caribbean Games =

- Logo of the games
- Host city: San Salvador
- Country: El Salvador
- Edition: 3rd
- Nations: 9
- Debuting countries: 1
- Athletes: 741
- Sport: 14
- Opening: 16 March 1935
- Closing: 5 April 1935
- Opened by: President Maximiliano Hernández Martínez
- Main venue: Estadio Nacional Flor Blanca

The third Central American and Caribbean Games (Spanish: III Juegos Centroamericanos y del Caribe) were held in San Salvador, El Salvador, from 16 March to 5 April 1935. The games featured 741 athletes from nine nations which competed in fourteen sports.

== Sports ==
- Athletics
- Baseball
- Basketball
- Boxing
- Diving
- Equestrian
- Fencing
- Football
- Golf
- Shooting
- Swimming
- Tennis
- Volleyball
- Wrestling

== Participating nations ==
Participating Nations
Costa Rica; Cuba; El Salvador (Host)	Guatemala; Honduras; Mexico	Nicaragua; Panama; Puerto Rico

== Medal table ==
* Host nation (El Salvador)

1935 Central American and Caribbean Games medal table
Rank	Nation	Gold	Silver	Bronze	Total
1	Mexico (MEX)	37	20	21	78
2	Cuba (CUB)	31	30	24	85
3	Puerto Rico (PUR)	5	5	5	15
4	El Salvador (SLV)*	4	4	10	18
5	Guatemala (GUA)	1	10	8	19
6	Panama (PAN)	1	5	2	8
7	Costa Rica (CRC)	0	1	0	1
7	Nicaragua (NCA)	0	1	0	1
9	Honduras (HON)	0	0	0	0
Totals (9 entries)		79	76	70	225
