= 1956 Panamerican Championship squads =

These are the squads for the countries that played in the 1956 Panamerican Championship.

The age listed for each player is on 26 February 1956, the first day of the tournament. The numbers of caps and goals listed for each player do not include any matches played after the start of the tournament. The club listed is the club for which the player last played a competitive match before the tournament. The nationality for each club reflects the national association (not the league) to which the club is affiliated. A flag is included for coaches who are of a different nationality than their own national team.

== Argentina ==
Head Coach: Guillermo Stábile

No.	Pos.	Player	Date of birth (age)	Caps	Goals	Club
	GK	Rogelio Antonio Domínguez	9 March 1931 (aged 24)	0	0	(Argentine Football Association) Racing Club
	GK	Antonio Roma	13 July 1932 (aged 23)	0	0	(Argentine Football Association) Ferro Carril Oeste
	DF	Federico Vairo	27 January 1930 (aged 26)	9	1	(Argentine Football Association) River Plate
	DF	Oscar Di Stéfano	29 December 1929 (aged 26)	0	0	(Argentine Football Association) Argentinos Juniors
	DF	Luis Raúl Cardoso	18 July 1930 (aged 25)	0	0	(Argentine Football Association) Boca Juniors
	DF	Federico Pizarro	1 January 1927 (aged 29)	2	0	(Argentine Football Association) San Lorenzo
	DF	Juan Manuel Filgueiras	11 January 1927 (aged 29)	4	0	(Argentine Football Association) Huracán
	MF	Juan Héctor Guidi	4 July 1930 (aged 25)	0	0	(Argentine Football Association) Lanús
	MF	Natalio Sivo	2 February 1936 (aged 20)	0	0	(Argentine Football Association) Racing Club
	MF	Eliseo Mouriño	3 June 1927 (aged 28)	15	0	(Argentine Football Association) Boca Juniors
	MF	Ernesto Gutiérrez	9 November 1927 (aged 28)	20	0	(Argentine Football Association) Racing Club
	MF	Nicolás Daponte	17 February 1928 (aged 28)	0	0	(Argentine Football Association) Lanús
	FW	Oreste Corbatta	11 March 1936 (aged 19)	0	0	(Argentine Football Association) Racing Club
	FW	Humberto Maschio	20 February 1933 (aged 23)	0	0	(Argentine Football Association) Racing Club
	FW	Benito Cejas	3 February 1934 (aged 22)	0	0	(Argentine Football Association) Lanús
	FW	Dante Lugo	28 August 1932 (aged 23)	0	0	(Argentine Football Association) Lanús
	FW	José Yudica	26 February 1936 (aged 20)	0	0	(Argentine Football Association) Newell's Old Boys
	FW	Luis Pentrelli	15 June 1932 (aged 23)	4	0	(Argentine Football Association) Gimnasia y Esgrima (LP)
	FW	Francisco Loiácono	11 December 1935 (aged 20)	2	0	(Argentine Football Association) Gimnasia y Esgrima (LP)
	FW	Omar Sívori	2 October 1935 (aged 20)	4	1	(Argentine Football Association) River Plate
	FW	Ernesto Cucchiaroni	16 November 1927 (aged 28)	6	0	(Argentine Football Association) Boca Juniors
	FW	Norberto Méndez	5 January 1923 (aged 33)	29	19	(Argentine Football Association) Tigre

== Brazil ==
Head coach: Teté

No.	Pos.	Player	Date of birth (age)	Caps	Goals	Club
	GK	Sérgio Torres	21 September 1926 (aged 29)	0	0	(Brazilian Football Confederation) Grêmio
	GK	Paulinho	22 July 1926 (aged 29)	0	0	(Brazilian Football Confederation) Floriano
	DF	Valdir de Moraes	23 November 1931 (aged 24)	0	0	(Brazilian Football Confederation) Renner
	DF	Oreco	13 June 1932 (aged 23)	0	0	(Brazilian Football Confederation) Internacional
	DF	Florindo	13 June 1932 (aged 23)	0	0	(Brazilian Football Confederation) Internacional
	DF	Duarte	3 April 1931 (aged 24)	0	0	(Brazilian Football Confederation) Internacional
	DF	Ênio Rodrigues	11 January 1927 (aged 29)	0	0	(Brazilian Football Confederation) Grêmio
	MF	Airton Pavilhão	31 October 1934 (aged 21)	0	0	(Brazilian Football Confederation) Grêmio
	MF	Odorico	2 July 1930 (aged 25)	0	0	(Brazilian Football Confederation) Internacional
	MF	Luizinho	13 June 1932 (aged 23)	0	0	(Brazilian Football Confederation) Internacional
	MF	Ênio Andrade	31 January 1928 (aged 28)	0	0	(Brazilian Football Confederation) Renner
	MF	Raul Klein	27 September 1927 (aged 28)	0	0	(Brazilian Football Confederation) Floriano
	MF	Figueiró	22 August 1934 (aged 21)	0	0	(Brazilian Football Confederation) Grêmio
	FW	Juarez Teixeira	20 September 1928 (aged 27)	0	0	(Brazilian Football Confederation) Grêmio
	DF	Ortunho	1 October 1935 (aged 20)	0	0	(Brazilian Football Confederation) Nacional-RS
	MF	Milton Kuelle	22 August 1933 (aged 22)	0	0	(Brazilian Football Confederation) Grêmio
	FW	Bodinho	16 July 1928 (aged 27)	0	0	(Brazilian Football Confederation) Internacional
	FW	Larry	3 November 1932 (aged 23)	3	4	(Brazilian Football Confederation) Internacional
	FW	Sarará	4 August 1931 (aged 24)	0	0	(Brazilian Football Confederation) Grêmio
	FW	Hercílio	29 January 1931 (aged 25)	0	0	(Brazilian Football Confederation) Grêmio
	FW	Jerônimo	28 July 1930 (aged 25)	0	0	(Brazilian Football Confederation) Internacional
	FW	Chinesinho	15 September 1935 (aged 20)	0	0	(Brazilian Football Confederation) Internacional

== Costa Rica ==
Head coach: Alfredo Piedra

No.	Pos.	Player	Date of birth (age)	Caps	Goals	Club
	GK	Hernán Alvarado Guerrero	25 November 1932 (aged 23)	8	0	(Costa Rican Football Federation) La Libertad
	GK	Mario Pérez Rodríguez	11 April 1936 (aged 19)	1	0	(Costa Rican Football Federation) Saprissa
	GK	René Muñoz		0	0	(Costa Rican Football Federation) Orión
	DF	Jorge Solís Vargas	25 March 1932 (aged 23)	6	0	(Costa Rican Football Federation) La Libertad
	DF	Mario Murillo	24 January 1927 (aged 29)	4	4	(Costa Rican Football Federation) Herediano
	DF	Reynaldo Orozco	24 November 1932 (aged 23)	2	0	(Costa Rican Football Federation) La Libertad
	DF	Mario Cordero	7 April 1930 (aged 25)	9	3	(Costa Rican Football Federation) Saprissa
	DF	Marvin Rodríguez	26 November 1934 (aged 21)	5	0	(Costa Rican Football Federation) Saprissa
	DF	Alex Sánchez	20 July 1930 (aged 25)	5	0	(Costa Rican Football Federation) Saprissa
	MF	Isidro Williams	22 December 1922 (aged 33)	6	0	(Costa Rican Football Federation) Uruguay de Coronado
	MF	Edgar Quesada	16 August 1931 (aged 24)	14	1	(Costa Rican Football Federation) Herediano
	MF	Tulio Quirós	7 August 1930 (aged 25)	1	0	(Costa Rican Football Federation) Saprissa
	MF	Elías Valenciano	4 April 1925 (aged 30)	0	0	(Costa Rican Football Federation) Gimnástica Española
	MF	Édgar Esquivel	27 February 1925 (aged 30)	7	1	(Costa Rican Football Federation) Herediano
	FW	Danilo Montero Campos	21 July 1937 (aged 18)	3	2	(Costa Rican Football Federation) Herediano
	FW	Jorge Monge	14 February 1938 (aged 18)	3	2	(Costa Rican Football Federation) Saprissa
	FW	Isaías Araya	7 August 1930 (aged 25)	0	0	(Costa Rican Football Federation) Alajuelense
	FW	Alexis Goñi	11 June 1933 (aged 22)	4	2	(Costa Rican Football Federation) Cartaginés
	FW	Álvaro Murillo	24 November 1930 (aged 25)	10	1	(Costa Rican Football Federation) Saprissa
	FW	Rodolfo Herrera González	11 August 1931 (aged 24)	10	8	(Costa Rican Football Federation) Saprissa
	FW	Rubén Jiménez	9 December 1932 (aged 23)	5	0	(Costa Rican Football Federation) Saprissa
	FW	Óscar Bejarano	15 September 1932 (aged 23)	1	0	(Costa Rican Football Federation) Herediano

== Chile ==
Head Coach: Luis Tirado

No.	Pos.	Player	Date of birth (age)	Caps	Goals	Club
	GK	Misael Escuti	20 December 1928 (aged 27)	11	0	(Football Federation of Chile) Colo Colo
	GK	Carlos Espinoza	21 April 1928 (aged 27)	2	0	(Football Federation of Chile) Everton
	DF	Manuel Álvarez	23 May 1928 (aged 27)	37	0	(Football Federation of Chile) Universidad Católica
	DF	Rodolfo Almeyda	10 June 1923 (aged 32)	16	0	(Football Federation of Chile) Palestino
	DF	Carlos Cubillos	25 December 1929 (aged 26)	8	0	(Football Federation of Chile) Unión Española
	DF	Carlos Carmona Albanez	18 March 1931 (aged 24)	0	0	(Football Federation of Chile) Ferrobádminton
	DF	Carlos Huerta	20 December 1933 (aged 22)	0	0	(Football Federation of Chile) Ferrobádminton
	MF	Mario Ortiz	28 January 1936 (aged 20)	0	0	(Football Federation of Chile) Palestino
	MF	Ramón Climent	5 September 1929 (aged 26)	0	0	(Football Federation of Chile) Rangers
	DF	Sergio Goity	21 February 1930 (aged 26)	1	0	(Football Federation of Chile) Palestino
	DF	Isaac Carrasco	12 August 1928 (aged 27)	18	0	(Football Federation of Chile) Colo Colo
	MF	Ramiro Cortés	27 April 1931 (aged 24)	32	0	(Football Federation of Chile) Audax Italiano
	MF	Enrique Hormazábal	6 January 1931 (aged 25)	35	14	(Football Federation of Chile) Colo Colo
	FW	Leonel Sánchez	25 April 1936 (aged 19)	7	2	(Football Federation of Chile) Universidad de Chile
	FW	José Fernández	23 February 1928 (aged 28)	9	1	(Football Federation of Chile) Palestino
	FW	Manuel Muñoz	28 April 1928 (aged 27)	23	8	(Football Federation of Chile) Colo Colo
	FW	Jaime Ramírez	14 August 1931 (aged 24)	13	4	(Football Federation of Chile) Colo Colo
	FW	Braulio Musso	8 March 1930 (aged 25)	2	1	(Football Federation of Chile) Universidad de Chile
	FW	Carlos Tello	28 March 1929 (aged 26)	5	0	(Football Federation of Chile) Audax Italiano
	FW	Guillermo Díaz Zambrano	29 December 1930 (aged 25)	10	3	(Football Federation of Chile) Palestino
	FW	René Meléndez	29 December 1928 (aged 27)	29	10	(Football Federation of Chile) Everton
	FW	Jorge Robledo	14 April 1926 (aged 29)	17	6	(Football Federation of Chile) Colo-Colo

== Mexico ==
Head coach: (Spain) Antonio López Herranz

No.	Pos.	Player	Date of birth (age)	Caps	Goals	Club
	GK	Jaime Gómez	29 December 1929 (aged 26)	0	0	(Mexican Football Federation) Guadalajara
	GK	Manuel Camacho	29 April 1929 (aged 26)	0	0	(Mexican Football Federation) Toluca
	DF	Máximo Vázquez	17 April 1933 (aged 22)	0	0	(Mexican Football Federation) Toluca
	DF	Narciso López	18 August 1928 (aged 27)	5	0	(Mexican Football Federation) Oro
	DF	Sergio Bravo	27 November 1927 (aged 28)	7	0	(Mexican Football Federation) León
	DF	José Villegas	20 June 1934 (aged 21)	0	0	(Mexican Football Federation) Guadalajara
	DF	José Luis Molina Porras	19 March 1931 (aged 24)	4	1	(Mexican Football Federation) Necaxa
	MF	Alfonso Portugal	21 January 1934 (aged 22)	0	0	(Mexican Football Federation) Necaxa
	MF	Pedro Nájera	3 February 1929 (aged 27)	0	0	(Mexican Football Federation) América
	MF	Samuel Cuburu	20 February 1929 (aged 27)	2	0	(Mexican Football Federation) Zacatepec
	MF	Raúl Cárdenas	30 October 1928 (aged 27)	6	1	(Mexican Football Federation) Zacatepec
	MF	Jaime Salazar	6 February 1931 (aged 25)	0	0	(Mexican Football Federation) Necaxa
	MF	Rodolfo Torres	5 May 1929 (aged 26)	0	0	(Mexican Football Federation) Irapuato
	FW	Carlos González	12 April 1935 (aged 20)	0	0	(Mexican Football Federation) Zamora
	FW	Ligorio López	3 July 1933 (aged 22)	0	0	(Mexican Football Federation) Atlante
	FW	Alfredo del Águila	3 January 1935 (aged 21)	0	0	(Mexican Football Federation) Necaxa
	FW	José Naranjo	19 March 1926 (aged 29)	12	3	(Mexican Football Federation) Oro
	FW	Carlos Calderón de la Barca	2 October 1934 (aged 21)	0	0	(Mexican Football Federation) Atlante
	FW	Horacio Casarín	25 May 1918 (aged 37)	13	15	(Mexican Football Federation) América
	FW	Antonio Jasso	11 March 1935 (aged 20)	0	0	(Mexican Football Federation) Necaxa
	FW	Salvador Reyes	20 September 1936 (aged 19)	0	0	(Mexican Football Federation) Guadalajara
	FW	Raúl Arellano	28 February 1935 (aged 20)	2	0	(Mexican Football Federation) Guadalajara

== Peru ==
Head Coach: Arturo Fernández Meyzán

No.	Pos.	Player	Date of birth (age)	Caps	Goals	Club
	GK	Rigoberto Felandro	4 January 1924 (aged 32)	0	0	(Peruvian Football Federation) Sport Boys
	GK	Carlos Novella	11 May 1929 (aged 26)	0	0	(Peruvian Football Federation) Ciclista Lima
	DF	Guillermo Delgado	11 February 1931 (aged 25)	21	0	(Peruvian Football Federation) Alianza Lima
	DF	Adolfo Donayre	10 August 1933 (aged 22)	0	0	(Peruvian Football Federation) Sporting Cristal
	DF	Alberto del Solar	1 January 1930 (aged 26)	0	0	(Peruvian Football Federation) Sporting Cristal
	DF	Víctor Salas	29 March 1935 (aged 20)	8	0	(Peruvian Football Federation) Universitario de Deportes
	MF	Dagoberto Lavalle	25 March 1925 (aged 30)	5	0	(Peruvian Football Federation) Deportivo Municipal
	MF	Carlos Lazón	5 October 1929 (aged 26)	10	0	(Peruvian Football Federation) Alianza Lima
	MF	Cornelio Heredia	16 October 1920 (aged 35)	29	2	(Peruvian Football Federation) Alianza Lima
	MF	Luis Calderón	17 June 1929 (aged 26)	17	0	(Peruvian Football Federation) Sport Boys
	MF	Augusto del Valle	25 July 1927 (aged 28)	0	0	(Peruvian Football Federation) Centro Iqueño
	MF	Carlos Fernández	28 July 1935 (aged 20)	0	0	(Peruvian Football Federation) Universitario de Deportes
	MF	Ernesto Morales	17 May 1925 (aged 30)	2	0	(Peruvian Football Federation) Centro Iqueño
	MF	Enrique Velásquez	28 July 1935 (aged 20)	0	0	(Peruvian Football Federation) Alianza Lima
	FW	Juan Emilio Salinas	12 July 1926 (aged 29)	4	2	(Peruvian Football Federation) Ciclista Lima
	FW	Máximo Mosquera	8 January 1928 (aged 28)	17	3	(Peruvian Football Federation) Alianza Lima
	FW	Óscar Gómez Sánchez	31 October 1935 (aged 20)	12	10	(Peruvian Football Federation) Alianza Lima
	FW	Félix Castillo	21 February 1928 (aged 28)	17	6	(Peruvian Football Federation) Alianza Lima
	MF	Roberto Drago	28 July 1923 (aged 32)	23	6	(Peruvian Football Federation) Deportivo Municipal
	FW	Guillermo Barbadillo	9 January 1925 (aged 31)	19	4	(Peruvian Football Federation) Alianza Lima
	FW	Juan Seminario	22 July 1936 (aged 19)	2	0	(Peruvian Football Federation) Deportivo Municipal
	FW	Jorge Lama	28 July 1923 (aged 32)	0	0	(Peruvian Football Federation) Sport Boys
