= History of the Colombia national football team =

The history of the Colombia national football team dates back to 1924, with the founding of the Colombian Football Federation. The Colombia national football team has had seven entries in the FIFA World Cup from 1962 onwards. Colombia hosted the 2001 Copa América, in which they were champions.

== Early years ==
Colombia played its first international match on 17 February 1926 against Costa Rica at the Julio Torres Stadium in Barranquilla, achieving a 4–1 victory with a team that competed under the name Selección Atlántico.

In 1937, Colombia formed a national team for the Juegos del IV Centenario de Cali (Games of the IV Centenary of Cali). Colombia played four matches at the recently opened Estadio Olímpico Pascual Guerrero:

- Colombia 3–1 Mexico (Jalisco selection)
- Colombia 1–3 Argentina (Independiente Rivadavia)
- Colombia 5–0 Ecuador (Ambato selection)
- Colombia 1–3 Cuba (Centro Gallego)

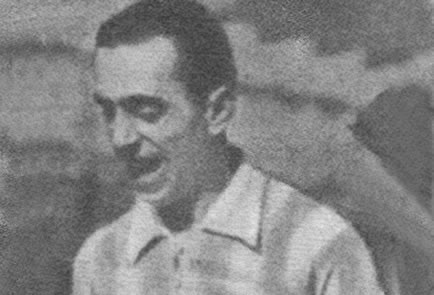
Fernando Paternoster was the first foreign manager of the Colombia national team. He coached Colombia in some of its first international games.

Colombia played matches at the 1938 Central American and Caribbean Games. The Colombia national football team was composed mostly by all the players of the Club Juventud Bogotana (now Millonarios FC). Alfonso Novoa was the manager of Colombia until 23 February.

The first game was played on 10 February 1938 against Mexico. Colombia was defeated 1–3; Luis Argüelles, Luis de la Fuente and Horacio Casarín scored for Mexico, Marcos Mejía scored for Colombia. Colombia was able to obtain the bronze medal, with two wins and three losses. The same year Colombia played at the I Bolivarian Games in Bogotá, where they were 4th with one win and three losses. Fernando Paternoster was the manager of Colombia, being the first foreign manager of the team.

Colombia did not play again until 1945 when they participated for the first time at the South American Championship, where they were fifth. This time, Colombia was composed by players of Junior de Barranquilla, except for Antonio de la Hoz, who played for Sporting de Barranquilla, and Pedro Ricardo López, who played for Boca Juniors de Cali. Roberto Meléndez was player and coach of Colombia throughout the tournament.

In 1946, Colombia participated at the 1946 Central American and Caribbean Games in Barranquilla. There they won the gold medal-winning all six matches, scoring 20 goals and conceding 7 goals. The manager of Colombia during the year was the Peruvian José Arana Cruz.

The next year, Colombia played at the 1947 South American Championship in Ecuador. The team was 8th, being the worst team of the tournament with two draws and five defeats, scoring only 2 goals. The manager, Lino Taioli, was sacked just after the tournament ended.

== 1950s to 1980s ==
=== Beginning of the professional era ===
The first match of Colombia in the professional era was played on 6 April in the 1949 South American Championship, a 3–0 defeat against Paraguay. The Austrian coach Friedrich Donnenfeld was the manager of Colombia during the tournament. He had moved with his family to Colombia due to the Second World War, and Atlético Junior would be his first team as a coach. As Junior was chosen to represent Colombia in the tournament, he became in the first European manager of the Colombia national team. The team, however, repeated their losing streak since, as in the previous tournament, ended eighth with two draws and five losses, scoring four goals.

Colombia missed the 1953, 1955 and 1956 editions of the South American Championship. For the 1957 South American Championship in Peru the manager was Pedro López, who was player of the national team between 1938 and 1945. Colombia was fifth, with two wins and four losses. In this tournament, Colombia suffered which is so far its biggest defeat, a 9–0 against Brazil. The most outstanding players of Colombia during the tournament players were the goalkeeper Efraín Sánchez and the forwards Carlos Arango and Delio Gamboa, both with three goals scored.

After a withdrew in 1938 and getting banned in 1954 (due to the controversial El Dorado era), Colombia participated for the first time in qualifying for the 1958 FIFA World Cup in Sweden with Rodolfo Orlandini as manager. Their first match was on 16 June 1957 against Uruguay in Bogotá, that ended in a 1–1 draw. Colombia lost their next matches, leaving them at the bottom of the group.

=== 1962 FIFA World Cup ===
In 1961, Colombia played the 1962 FIFA World Cup qualifiers. They faced Peru in a two-game series. The first match, played in Bogotá, was won by Colombia 1–0 with a 26th-minute goal of Eusebio Escobar. The next match, played in Lima, ended in a 1–1 draw, with a 68th-minute goal from Héctor González Garzón for Colombia. With this, Colombia qualified for their first World Cup.

At the World Cup, Colombia lost their first match 2–1 against Uruguay. Luis Cubilla and Jorge Sasía scored for Uruguay at the 56th and 75th minute respectively, while Francisco Zuluaga scored a 19th-minute penalty goal for Colombia. In the second match they got a 4–4 draw with the Soviet Union, champions of the 1960 European Nations' Cup. In this game, Colombia scored four goals against Soviet goalkeeper Lev Yashin, widely considered the best goalkeeper in football history. Also in that game, Marcos Coll scored the only olympic goal in World Cup history so far. Unfortunately, the Colombian campaign in 1962 ended with a 5–0 defeat against Yugoslavia, who eventually ended up in fourth place at the tournament.

=== From 1962 to 1990 ===
Colombia had to wait 28 years to come back in a World Cup. After withdrawing the two editions of the South American Championship in Argentina and Ecuador, Colombia participated in the 1963 South American Championship in Bolivia. Colombia finished last in the tournament with a draw and five defeats. Delio Gamboa was the goalscorer of Colombia with three goals. For the 1966 FIFA World Cup qualifiers, Colombia was placed in a group against Ecuador and Chile. The team finished in the bottom of their group with 2 points, only with a 2–0 win over Chile in Bogotá. The following year, Colombia had to play qualifying for the 1967 South American Championship against Chile, but was eliminated with a 5–2 defeat in Santiago and a 0–0 draw in Bogotá.

Colombia participated for qualifying for the 1970 FIFA World Cup in Group 2, with Brazil, Paraguay and Venezuela. The team finished 3rd with one win, one draw and four defeats. In 1970, before the start of the World Cup in Mexico, England prepared a friendly against Colombia to prepare the team for the high altitudes of Mexico. The team won 4–0 to Colombia, but their victory was overshadowed by the Bogotá Bracelet incident. For the 1974 FIFA World Cup qualifiers, Colombia faced Uruguay and Ecuador. Colombia was able to obtain a win and three draws, tied with 5 points to Uruguay, but Uruguay would be who classify due to a better goal difference average.

In the 1975 Copa America Colombia was placed in Group C with Paraguay and Ecuador. Colombia won all four games with 7 goals for and 1 against, which advanced to the semifinals against Uruguay. Colombia won 3–0 at home and lost 1–0 away, however the overall score 3–1 allowed them to advance to the final, where they faced Peru. Colombia won at home 1–0, but lost 2–0 away, so that the champion was defined on neutral ground (in Caracas) where Peru beat Colombia with a 25th-minute goal from Hugo Sotil. Colombian Ernesto Díaz tied with Argentinian Leopoldo Luque as the top goalscorer of the tournament with 4 goals.

== 1990s ==
For the 1990 World Cup, South America was allocated three-and-a-half berths at the 1990 finals. The continent's nine remaining sides were split into three groups with the two automatic qualifying berths going to the two best group winners, in this instance Uruguay and Brazil. The group winner with the worst record would advance to the CONMEBOL / OFC Intercontinental Play-off. Thus Colombia had to take on the winners of the Oceania zone. Curiously, this turned out to be Israel, after they finished ahead of Australia and New Zealand in the final qualifying group. Colombia qualified for their first FIFA World Cup since Chile 1962 after winning in Barranquilla 1–0, and tying in Israel 0–0.

=== 1990 FIFA World Cup ===
At Italia '90, Colombia defeated United Arab Emirates 2–0, lost to Yugoslavia 1–0, and earned their place in the Round of Sixteen after a dramatic 1–1 draw with West Germany, who would later win the Cup. During their Round of Sixteen match against Cameroon, the game went into extra time after a 0–0 draw. In an unfortunate moment, goalkeeper René Higuita failed to protect the ball 35 yards (32 m) from the goal line, enabling Cameroon striker Roger Milla to snatch it from him, and score Cameroon's decisive second goal. Milla struck twice, giving Cameroon a 2–0 lead in extra time. Colombia would score in the 115th minute, but were unable to get an equalizer.

=== 1994 FIFA World Cup ===
Colombia finished top of their qualifying group without having lost a match, which included a historic 5–0 win over Argentina in Buenos Aires. Expectations of the team were high, some even naming them as favourites to win the tournament.

The match between Colombia and Romania was the first game for either side in the group phase. Romania took the lead in the 16th minute with their first attack of the match when Raducioiu took on three defenders before firing home a low shot. On the half-hour mark, Hagi made it 2–0 when he noticed Córdoba out of position and dipped a cross over his head into the net. Valencia pulled a goal back for the Colombians in the 43rd minute when he headed in a corner from Perez. In the second half, Raducioiu put the result beyond doubt with his second goal in the final few minutes.

The team went into their second group game against the United States knowing they had to win to have any chance of progressing. On the 35th minute Andrés Escobar attempted to cut out a cross but accidentally deflected the ball into his own net. Earnie Stewart took the US two goals in front after scoring in the 56th minute. Valencia scored a consolation goal for Colombia in the closing minutes of the match. They did win their final group match 2–0 over Switzerland, but it was not enough to help them progress. Tragically, Escobar died on 2 July 1994 as it is believed that his own goal, vs the United States, caused huge losses for Colombia's drug lords.

=== 1998 FIFA World Cup ===
Colombia began their qualification rounds in South America well and ended in third place with 28 points, 2 points below Argentina who was in 1st place with 30 points. They ended in Group G with Tunisia, England, and Romania.

In their opening match, Colombia once again reunited with Romania. And just like four years ago, the Carpathian side emerged victoriously, with Adrian Ilie of Valencia gave Romania a 1–0 victory over Colombia after he placed a magnificent chip shot in the 44th minute from some 15 yards (14 m) that sailed over goalkeeper Farid Mondragón into the net. Colombia's second match was against Tunisia. Colombia's Leider Preciado struck seven minutes from the end of full-time to give a 1–0 win. Although England needed only a draw to guarantee a place in the round of 16, Darren Anderton drove home a fiercely-struck angled drive in the 20th minute. David Beckham curled in a 30-yard (27 m) free-kick nine minutes later and England won the game 2–0, thus eliminating Colombia.

== 2000s ==
=== 2001 Copa América ===
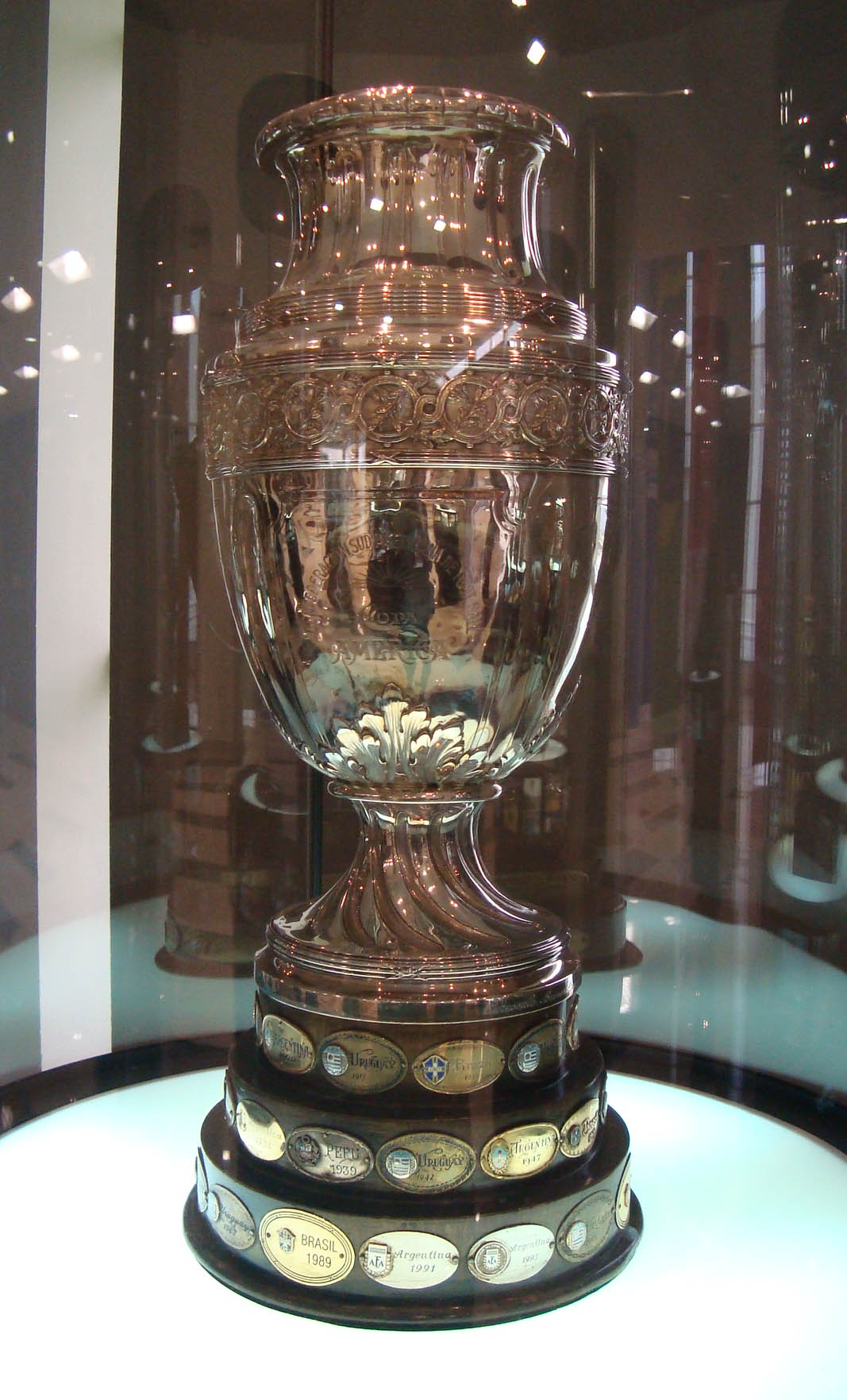
Colombia won the 2001 edition of the Copa America while setting a historical new record.

Colombia's exit at France '98 marked the end of an era, as many expected, but one last moment of glory came at Copa América 2001.

The Copa América in 2001 was held in Colombia, from 11 to 29 July. It was organised by CONMEBOL, South America's football governing body. Prior to the tournament, three meetings were held by CONMEBOL authorities who were concerned about potential security issues in Colombia, for what Venezuela offered to host the competition. At the last minute, CONMEBOL decided to return the organization to Colombia, and the tournament was held on schedule. Complaining for the sudden decision, and claiming that Argentine players had received death threats from terrorist groups, the Argentine Football Association decided to withdraw from the competition. Because Canada and Argentina withdrew, on July 6 and July 10 respectively, Honduras and Costa Rica were invited. There were no terrorist incidents within the competition. Colombia was placed in Group A with Venezuela, Chile, and Ecuador, and they finished on top of the group with nine points.

Hosts Colombia won their first Copa América title by beating Mexico in Bogotá. Their captain Iván Córdoba scored the decisive goal early in the second half, with a header from a free kick taken by Gerardo Bedoya. It was a fairytale success for Colombia after the decision to go ahead with the tournament after it had initially been cancelled. Even the fact that Argentina, regarded by most observers as the strongest side in the region, elected not to take part and that most countries fielded weakened teams failed to dampen the celebrations in Bogotá. It was also noted the following year that Brazil was then considered to be the strongest in the region at the time following their 2002 FIFA World Cup victory, thus making the event "legitimate". This is also credited to the fact that Argentina failed to make it out of the group stage at the 2002 World Cup.

=== 2002 FIFA World Cup ===
For Korea/Japan 2002, hopes were high for Colombia, but a weak attack and internal turmoil crushed their hopes. Colombia only managed to place sixth in the qualification round. Uruguay and Colombia had both 27 points but due to goal difference, Uruguay advanced to the play-offs with Australia.

=== 2005 CONCACAF Copa de Oro ===
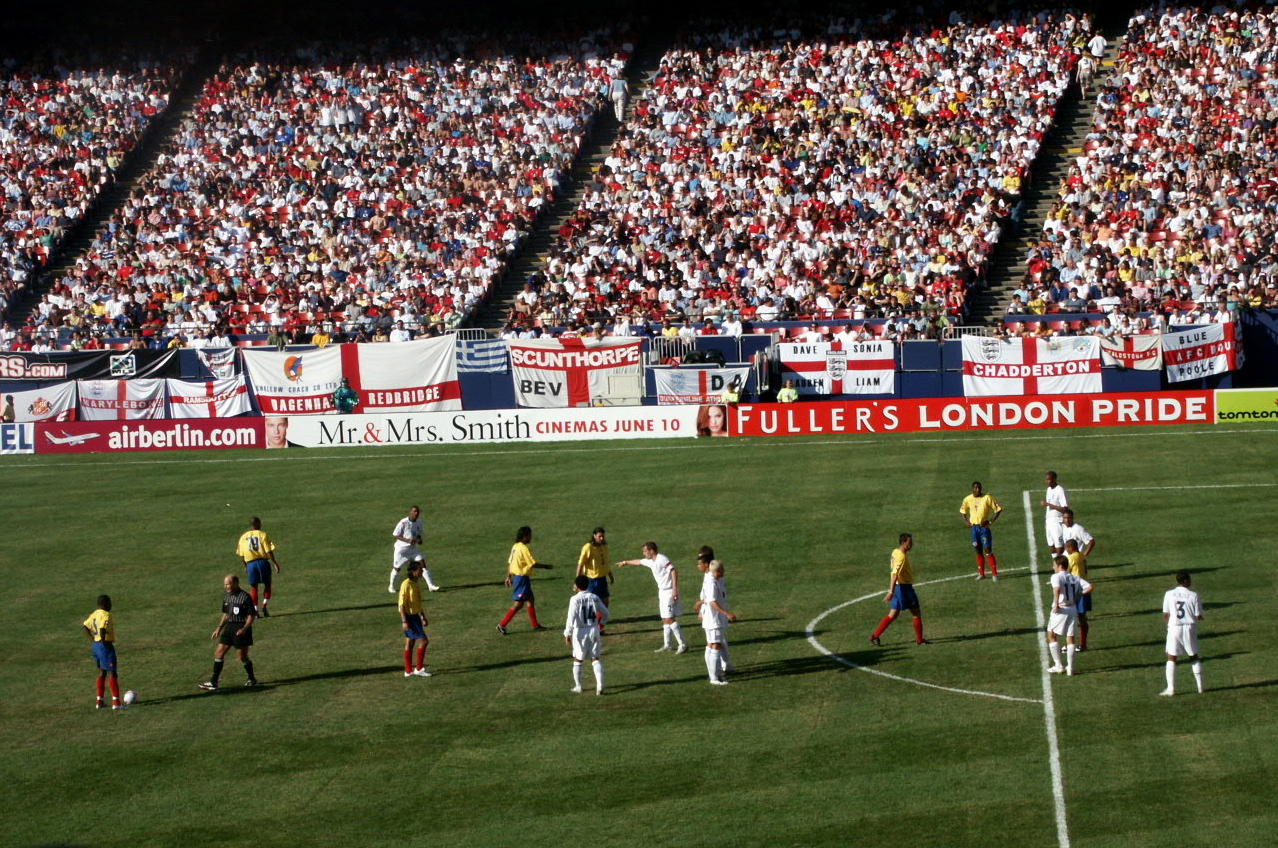
The Colombian team playing a friendly match against England in East Rutherford, New Jersey, United States (2005)

The 2005 CONCACAF Copa de Oro, or Gold Cup, was played in July 2005 in the United States. Colombia and South Africa were invited guests. Colombia was placed in Group A with Panama, Honduras, and Trinidad and Tobago. There were three groups with four teams each, which meant that all three first- and second-place finishers would advance to the quarter-finals and so would the best two third-place finishers. Colombia's opening match was against Panama where they lost 1–0. Tejada, who plays for Colombian club Millonarios, netted the game's lone score in the 70th minute. The next match was against Honduras where they lost again 2–1. Two late goals gave Honduras the advantage as the catrachos defeated Colombia 2–1 in Group A action of the 2005 CONCACAF Gold Cup. The win is the first for Honduras in the tournament since 2000, when they also defeated Colombia. The third match was against Trinidad and Tobago where they won a 2–0 victory. Colombia reached the quarterfinals to face Mexico. Colombia beat Mexico 2–1 as an unexpected goal from Abel Aguilar helped the South American squad advance to the semifinals. Colombia reached the semifinals only to be defeated by Panama, the underdogs of the tournament. Panama clipped Colombia 3–2 in front of more than 40,000 people at Giants Stadium.

=== 2006 FIFA World Cup ===
2006 FIFA World Cup -Germany was an important moment for Colombia, having failed to qualify for the 2002 World Cup. Head coach Francisco Maturana led the team through four FIFA qualifiers and was fired after losing to Brazil 2–1 in Barranquilla, getting thrashed 4–0 by a weak Bolivia and suffering a shocking 1–0 defeat at home to Venezuela. Following a 1–1 tie with Argentina he was fired and Reinaldo Rueda was placed as the new coach. Colombia seemed to have improved and defeated Peru and Uruguay 5–0 during qualifying, managed a 3–0 victory over arch-rivals Ecuador, and tied with Brazil 0–0 in São Paulo. Towards the end Colombia (21 pts), Chile (21pts), and Uruguay (22 pts) had a chance to target the playoffs with Australia. Colombia (21 pts) traveled to Asunción hoping for three points against Paraguay (28), who sealed their place in Germany while Chile battled against Ecuador and Uruguay against Argentina. As in the 2002 qualifiers, the last match of Argentina was against Uruguay, and in both occasions Uruguay needed a favourable result to reach fifth place in order to make the playoffs to earn a place in the World Cup. Even though Colombia won its match against Paraguay, Uruguay also won the match against Argentina, again reaching the position to play the playoff for the last ticket to Germany. Both Argentina and Paraguay had already qualified. Colombia ended with 24 points, once again behind Uruguay, with 25 points.

=== After Copa América 2007 ===
After Copa América 2007, the Colombia national football team boomed with recent success in the South American 2010 FIFA World Cup qualifiers. After embarrassing losses against Paraguay, and Argentina in the Copa América, many Colombians nonetheless anticipated a successful run for 2010 FIFA World Cup classification. In the first match of the qualifying round, Colombia, defying expectations that they would lose to Brazil, drew 0–0 with Brazil at home. Not long after that, Colombia surprisingly tied 0–0 again with Bolivia national football team, but many argue that this was largely due to the fact that the altitude of La Paz contributes to usual losses or ties for non-Bolivian teams. However, Colombia would find their very first win after defeating a weak Venezuela national football team 1–0, with a stupendous free kick courtesy of Rubén Darío Bustos. In their next game, Colombia would defy expectations again by beating Argentina, at the time ranked first in the world. On November 17, 2007, In Bogotá against Argentina, Lionel Messi beat the defense before scoring past goalkeeper Agustín Julio. Colombia turned the game around in the second half, however, when Rubén Darío Bustos got his second free kick goal of the qualifying campaign, and not long after that, Dayro Moreno scored his first international goal for Colombia. Colombia won the match 2–1, obtaining 4th place in the world cup qualifiers. On June 14, 2008, Colombia tied Peru 1–1 moving Colombia up to 3rd place in the world cup qualifiers after a Brazilian loss to Paraguay. Another 0–0 between Ecuador and Colombia in Quito was on June 18, 2008, and Colombia remain at 3rd place and as the only undefeated country in the qualification after Bolivia won Paraguay 4–2. Successive defeats to Uruguay and Paraguay at home, and a thrashing away to Chile, however, left Colombia in an extremely dangerous position knocking them out of the top five and forcing them to set their sights on the fifth play-off spot only. As of September 25, 2009, they are eighth after a 3–1 defeat at the hands of Uruguay in Montevideo. On October 10, 2009, Colombia lost 4–2 in Colombia against Chile, losing any possibility of assisting to 2010 World Cup. After that, on October 14, 2009, they played their last qualification match against Paraguay, in Asunción, Paraguay, beating 2–0 and finishing in 7th place in the table standings with 23 points, one point behind Uruguay, who went on to compete in the play-offs, and eventually play in the World Cup

=== 2010 World Cup and aftermath ===
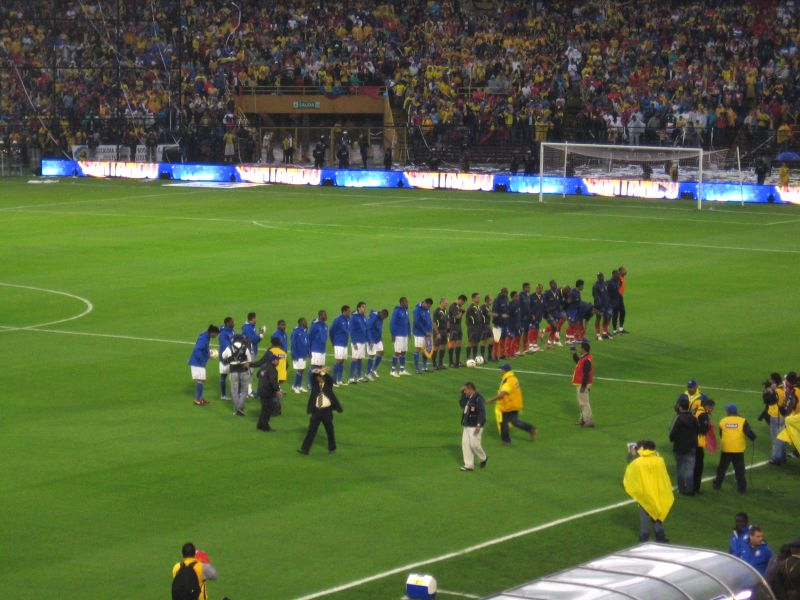
National anthems in a match against Brazil.

Colombia failed to qualify for the 2010 FIFA World Cup, mainly because their constant change of formations and struggles to score goals in the last games of the qualification. They played an Exhibition Match against South Africa a month before the World Cup started, which they lost 2–1. The game was the first soccer match played in the recently built Soccer City Stadium in Johannesburg, South Africa. All three goals of the match were scored by penalty kicks, and the match was highly criticized because both of the South Africa penalty kicks did not seem to be fouls at all, and because of the reported partiality of the referee towards the South Africa team. Another Exhibition Match was played in England against Nigeria, a match that ended in a 1–1 draw. Both matches were the first ones that coach Hernán Darío Gómez directed after his designation and return to Colombia's coaching. With a 2–0 win over Venezuela, and a 1–0 win against Ecuador, they wanted success over USA (which ended 0–0). In between all that they lost to Mexico 1–0. Los Cafeteros tied with Peru 1–1 but loss in an action packed duel against champions Spain 1–0. They successfully defeated Ecuador again 2–0 but suffered a 2–0 defeat to Chile in March even after many goal attempts. Colombia had beaten Honduras 2-0 after two spectacular goals from Teo, although many fans complain games such as this one aren't testing their full potential. In Ft. Lauderdale, Colombia beat Jamaica 2–0 with Jackson Martinez and Teo scoring to test Leonel Álvarez's side as a coach.

=== 2011 Copa América ===
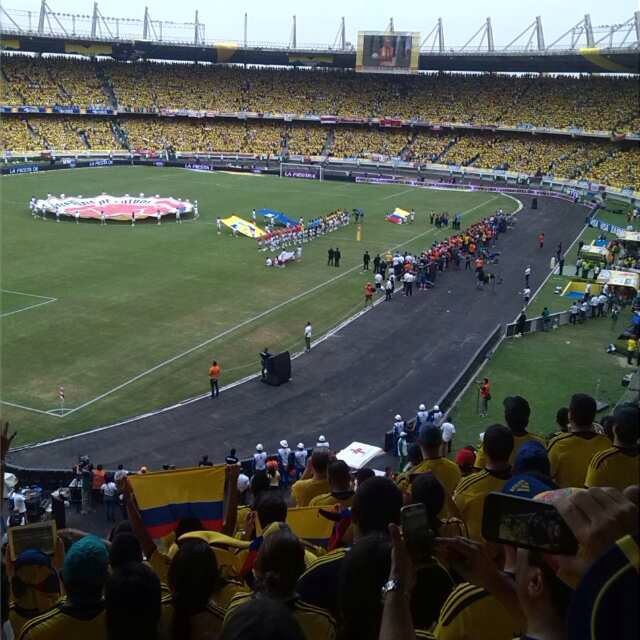
The Estadio Metropolitano, Barranquilla before a match between Colombia and Chile, game that would end in a 3–3 draw.

In Copa América 2011, Colombia showed great skill beating Costa Rica 1–0 goal given by Adrián Ramos thanks to an assist by Fredy Guarín. Colombia with an epic match against Argentina dominating the game almost entirely although suffered by their weakness in goal scoring thus ending 0–0. Finally, they crushed Bolivia 2–0 both goals by Radamel Falcao, one via a penalty. This resulted in shocking the host nation Argentina, who were favourites to win the group. After that, they confronted Peru with high expectations. Before extra time, Falcao was given a penalty only to miss by a wide shot, leading to extra time. Colombia lost 2–0 after a mistake by defence as Mario Yepes had accidentally tripped goalkeeper Neco Martínez – who conceded no goals up to this point –allowing Peruvian player Carlos Lobatón a clear shot. Martinez later had mistakenly kicked the ball to Juan Manuel Vargas, who sealed the victory for Peru.

=== 2014 FIFA World Cup Cycle ===
==== 2014 qualification ====
The Colombian side started very well in their 2014 World Cup qualifiers by beating Bolivia 2–1 in La Paz and a difficult match against Venezuela which ended 1–1 in Barranquilla. Colombia then lost to Argentina 1–2 after losing both star players Radamel Falcao and Fredy Guarín due to injuries. After lack of support, Leonel Álvarez was sacked only barely three months tying and losing for the first time, which was largely criticized by many Colombians, particularly Colombian legend Carlos Valderrama, for firing him prematurely. By the beginning of 2012, José Pékerman became the new coach of the national team. In early 2012, Colombia showed great skill defeating 2011 Golden Cup winners Mexico 2–0 in what was José Pékerman's friendly taking control of the game almost entirely.

Leonel Álvarez became the new coach following the resignation of Hernán Darío Gómez, but was sacked after three games with disappointing results, which led in the hiring of Argentina's José Pékerman. With an impressive World Cup cycle campaign, Colombia would break a personal qualifying best record, and raise the FIFA ranking consistently into the top ten; they also qualified for the World Cup for the first time in 16 years. Celebrations broke throughout the nation, as many neutrals hailed Colombia as a dark-horse towards being a World Cup contender. Often, Colombia were noted by many figures in Colombia, such as Carlos Valderrama, as a team that could become the most successful Colombian squad in history.

Pékerman, however, experimented with a new system, barely granting Colombia a 1–0 over Peru then leading to a 0–1 loss to Ecuador. Colombia, however, bounced back, crushing Copa América winners Uruguay in a 4–0 win, ending their undefeated streak since the 2010 World Cup. Los Cafeteros beat Chile from a goal down 1–3, this time in an away victory. Colombia won a comfortable 2–0 home victory against Paraguay during the qualifiers, ending the first half of the CONMEBOL qualification. In a duel with 2014 World Cup hosts Brazil, Colombia scored first in a game that ended 1–1.

Continuing the second half the CONMEBOL qualifiers, Colombia enjoyed a comfortable 5–0 win over Bolivia. Colombia, however, suffered days later in a 1–0 loss to Venezuela at an away game, where Pékerman proposed a different formation, 4–4–1–1). In the match against South American leaders Argentina, Colombia played a very controversial match in which both teams were red carded a player in the first half and eight yellow cards were issued, leading to a difficult goalless draw. Days later, Colombia dominated Peru in a 2–0 victory.

Colombia continued on with the final stages of the world cup qualifiers, beating a tough, defensive ten-man Ecuador with a 1–0 victory, which guaranteed them a play-off spot. Colombia, however, failed to seal automatic qualification against Uruguay, where they only needed a draw but lost 2–0.

In the following match against Chile on 11 October, Colombia shockingly gave up three goals in the first 30 minutes. Pékerman was criticized for his lineup choices once more, where he then made two essential subs immediately in the second half, which eventually led into Colombia scoring the three required goals, thus allowing them to tie the game and qualify for the World Cup for the first time in 16 years. Days later, Colombia topped off their qualification against Paraguay, where they were ironically red carded a man following an early goal by Paraguay. However, a ten-man Colombia managed to make a 1–2 comeback to win the game and gain their highest ever point record in the World Cup qualifying history, both goals being scored by captain and defender Mario Yepes.

==== 2014 FIFA World Cup ====
Colombia topped off their return in the 2014 World Cup after a 16-year absence by defeating Greece 3–0. Colombia then edged a 2–1 victory over the Ivory Coast to dispute Group C's top spot days later. On the same day, Japan and Greece drew 0–0 and automatically qualified Colombia to the round of 16 for the first time in 24 years since the 1990 World Cup. In its final group stage game, Colombia defeated Japan 4–1 to win Group C and become the third South American team (following Brazil and Argentina) to win all three games in group stage in World Cup history. The Japan match also saw goalkeeper Faryd Mondragón, the last active player from the country's previous World Cup appearance in 1998, become the oldest player ever to appear in a World Cup. Colombia went on to defeated Uruguay 2–0 on 28 June in the round of 16, securing a spot in the quarter-finals for the first time in their history. Colombia then fell to hosts Brazil 2–1 in the quarter-final round in controversy, where media and figures such as Diego Maradona criticized FIFA and Carlos Velasco Carballo for "favoring" Brazil and being biased in disallowing a goal from Mario Yepes and allowing too many fouls by the Brazilians to occur without any yellow cards being shown.

Despite the elimination, the national team was greeted by tens of thousands of Colombians in Bogotá, welcoming them back as heroes and restoring pride to the nation. Colombia would then receive the FIFA Fair Play Trophy and have James Rodríguez and Juan Cuadrado end as the World Cup's leading goal scorer and assist leader, respectively.

=== 2015 Copa América ===
Colombia had a disappointing 2015 Copa América, having won only a single game during the group stage match against Brazil, with their only goal of the tournament. Colombia would be eliminated by Argentina in the next round via penalty shootout, ending their campaign with one win, two draws, and one loss. Their only goal throughout the tournament was scored by Jeison Murillo, who would later win the tournament's Best Young Player award and be included in the tournament's Star XI.

=== Copa América Centenario ===
Colombia began their campaign with a 0–2 victory against hosts United States. Days later they sealed their qualification to the quarter-finals with a 2–1 victory against Paraguay. However, they fell to Costa Rica 2–3 and finished second in the group following a complete change with 11 of their starters. On 17 June, they advanced to the semi-finals with a win against Peru on penalties 4–2 in front of 79,000 fans at MetLife Stadium. Colombia would then lose to eventual tournament winners Chile following mistakes by their defense. Colombia, however, won the third place match against the hosts United States to seal their best result since winning the 2001 edition.

=== 2018 FIFA World Cup ===
==== World Cup ====
Colombia qualified for the 2018 FIFA World Cup by finishing fourth in CONMEBOL qualifying with seven wins, six draws and five losses and drew a challenging group; playing with Japan, Poland and Senegal. The team was nevertheless considered the group favorites, but began their campaign with an unexpected 2–1 controversial defeat to Japan, with Carlos Sánchez being sent off after just three minutes of play. Colombia resurrected their hopes of advancing from the group with a 3–0 win over Poland, whose own chances of advancing were ended with the defeat. After the match, head coach José Pékerman dedicated the win to Carlos Sánchez. On 28 June, Colombia beat Senegal by a scoreline of 1–0, topping their group and advancing into the round of 16, and eliminated Senegal in process as well. On 3 July in Moscow, Colombia were knocked out by England in the round of 16; the game finished 1–1 after extra time, with England winning 4–3 on penalties.

Match referee Mark Geiger proved to be controversial, with criticism from both sets of teams. Colombia captain Radamel Falcao and manager José Pékerman both accused Geiger of favouring the England team during the match. Diego Maradona once again claimed favouritism against Colombia, saying, "England's penalty was a terrible call and that the ref won the match for England," and that Colombia were victims of a "monumental robbery". In response, FIFA said Maradona's comments were "entirely inappropriate" and insinuations about the referee "completely unfounded". A FIFA statement read, "Following comments made by Diego Armando Maradona in relation to yesterday's round of 16 game, Colombia vs England, FIFA strongly rebukes the criticism of the performance of the match officials which it considers to have been positive in a tough and highly emotional match. Furthermore, it also considers the additional comments and insinuations made as being entirely inappropriate and completely unfounded." Maradona subsequently apologized to FIFA and its president, admitting some of things he said were unacceptable: "I said a couple of things and, I admit, some of them are unacceptable."

=== 2019 Copa América ===
Following the federation's choice to not renew Pekerman's contract, former Iran manager Carlos Queiroz was hired to coach the national team. After an impressive 8 goal run, winning 3 out of 4 of their pre-Copa America friendlies as well as conceding only 2 goals in only one, optimism for the Portuguese coach and the team itself was strong.

Starting off their 2019 Copa América campaign, Colombia defeated favorites Argentina in a shocking 2–0 win, marking their first victory over the La Albiceleste since 2007. Days later, they would face a very defensive Asian Cup champions and 2022 World Cup hosts Qatar with a 1–0 victory to end Qatar's unbeaten streak to eight and becoming in the first team in the group stages to advance to the next round.; Colombia would end their group stage run in perfect fashion with a 1–0 victory over Paraguay, resting a majority of their starters and finishing with nine points with four goals scored and none conceded throughout the group stage. Colombia became the only team since the 2001 edition to advance out of the group stage with a 100% perfect run. Despite this achievement, Colombia was then eliminated by Chile in a penalty shootout during the quarter-finals match where Colombia performed poorly, only to be saved by the referee over two disallowed Chilean goals.

== Kits ==
Since its inception the Colombia national team has adopted different colors for their uniform. This article describes the evolution of the Colombia national football team strip along the years.

=== History ===
In July 1937, on the occasion of the inauguration of Estadio Olímpico Pascual Guerrero of Cali and the fourth centenary of the founding of Cali city, was an international tournament with teams from Mexico, Argentina, Cuba and would be the first Colombia team in unofficial game. In this opening Colombia team won 3–1 over Mexico. (Without information from the uniform worn.)

==== Colombia sky blue ====
Later in 1938, the Colombia team officially participated in the 1938 Central American and Caribbean Games in Panama and later in the same year in Bogotá Bolivarian Games, for these two tournaments wore a sky blue shirt, white shorts and white socks. The sky blue may have been modeled upon three of the world's best teams at the time: Uruguay (Olympic Gold in 1924 and 1928 and the inaugural winners of the World Cup in 1930), Italy (World Cup winners in 1934 and 1938) and Argentina (Olympic Silver in 1928 and World Cup finalist in 1930).

==== Colombia white ====
In the year 1945, the highest authority in the Colombian football: Adefútbol, affiliated to FIFA and CONMEBOL, then the Colombia team participated for the first time in Copa América called 1945 South American Championship, held in Chile, where they played with a team purely "brown" because it was the Junior Barranquilla. (Without information from the kit worn.) Colombia team also participated in 1947 South American Championship and again in 1949, Adefútbol called to Junior Barranquilla to represent Colombia at the 1949 South American Championship in Brazil. (Without information from the uniform worn.)

In commemoration to the Copa America Centenario 2016 tournament being held in the United States, Colombia will bring back the iconic white style color home jersey, with small accents of navy blue and red.

==== Colombia dark blue ====
Colombia's participation in the championship 1957 South American Championship and the first appearance in the World Cup in 1962 wore a dark blue shirt white shorts with white or dark blue socks and as an alternate dark blue shirt, dark blue shorts and white socks. This same kit was used in qualifying for the 1966 World.

==== Colombia orange ====
On 15 June 1971, long after the power struggle between Adefútbol and Dimayor, a general assembly was held to give life to the present Colombian Football Federation and with it came the orange uniform, evoking the powerful Netherlands team world runner-up in 1974 and 1978: orange shirt with the national flag crossed on the chest, white shorts and orange socks, and for away matches a white shirt with the national flag crossed on the chest. In the great Copa América 75 on Efraín "Caiman" Sánchez's team achieved the first time a subtitle Copa América, orange shirt was used without the fringe on the chest, black shorts and orange socks. By the early 1980s is still with the same uniform, this time sponsored by the French brand Le Coq Sportif. In the friendly match 24 August 1984 against Argentina in which the Colombia team won 1–0, the side again used the orange shirt with the tricolor band cross.

==== Colombia tricolor ====
In 1985, Colombia started the tricolor era for the uniform of Colombia team, and for 1986 World Cup qualifying used a kit designed by María Elvira Pardo with tricolor turtle neck, sleeves and stockings with tricolor edge, red shirt, blue shorts and yellow socks for the home matches, and yellow shirt for the away matches. Colombia used kits manufactured by Adidas in the final matches of qualifying, though keeping the same colours.

In 1987, for the 1987 Copa América, Colombia wore a kit manufactured by Puma with a yellow shirt, blue shorts and red socks.

For the 1988 Ciudad de Bogotá Cup, the 1989 Copa América and the 1990 World Cup qualification Colombia reverting to wearing Adidas, with red shirt, blue shorts and yellow socks for home matches and yellow shirt for away matches. Adidas also designed the kit for the 1990 World Cup, keeping the same colours.

In the 1991 Copa América, Colombia used kits manufactured by Spanish brand Kelme and kept the same colours of the previous year: red shirt for home matches and yellow shirt for away matches.

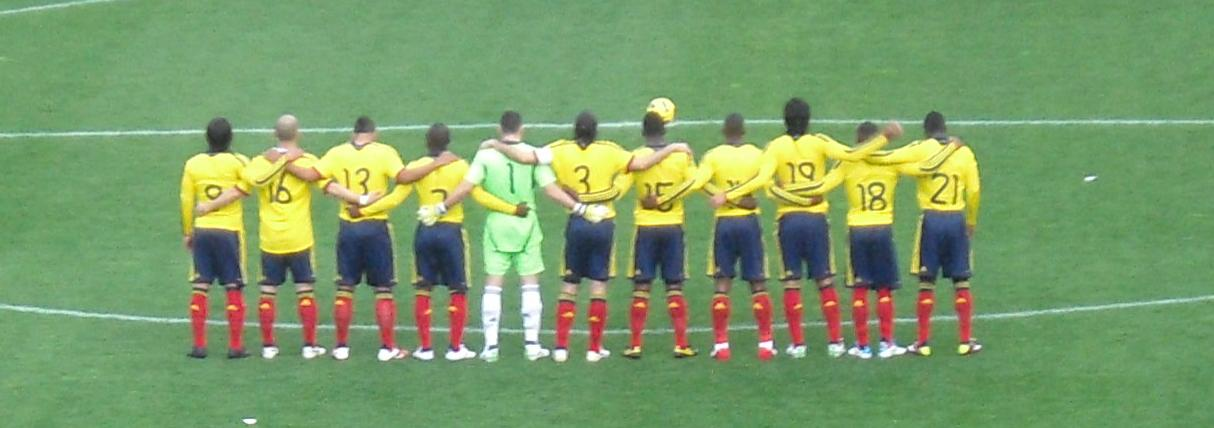
Colombia national football team 2011 at Vicente Calderón Stadium

Since 1992, Colombia has used a local yellow shirt, blue shorts and red socks from the brand Comba. For the 1993 Copa América The 1994 FIFA World Cup Colombia national team was worn by Umbro with the same colours: yellow shirt, blue shorts and red socks and blue shirt for away matches. Umbro sponsored Colombia until 1997, when in 1998 Reebok became the side's new brand ahead of the 1998 World Cup, keeping the same colours for home matches and blue shirt, white shorts and white or blue socks for away matches. Reebok equipped the side for the 2001 Copa América and until 2002.

Between 29 and 30 December 2002, the Federation traveled to Panama to negotiate with the Italian sportswear company Lotto; they obtained sponsorship in 2003 and it was used on the 2003 Confederations Cup, keeping the same colours that they had been using for both home and away jerseys. Lotto equipped the side until 2010. Since 2011, Adidas has been supplying the team's apparel, as unveiled in a March 2011 press conference. For the 2011 South American Youth Championship in Peru, held in January, Colombia used a preliminary kit design from Adidas.

In November 2013, Adidas released a very controversial new design for the home jersey, carrying a yellow/blue striped shirt while also carrying blue and white designs, while attending to white shorts and white socks (carrying the Colombian flag stripes), where many Colombian supporters gave a negative mixed response. Likely due towards breaking the traditional yellow shirt, blue shorts, and red socks that started during early 2013 by changing the socks to white. Adidas, however, was praised for including the traditional Sombrero Vueltiao within the blue stripe that also surrounds the country's football association badge. Although more positive response has turned towards the away jersey (to be fully revealed in January 2014) over a red scheme, returning the classical late 1980s / early 1990s praised jerseys.

=== Kit evolution ===
Colombia Kit chronology
| Season | Brand | Home | Alternatives |
|---|---|---|---|
| 1938 | No supplier | | |
| 1947 | No supplier | | |
| 1957-1960 | No supplier | | |
| 1960-1961 | No supplier | | |
| 1962-1965 | No supplier | | |
| 1971-1974 | No supplier | | |
| 1975-1979 | No supplier | | |
| 1980-1981 | Le Coq Sportif | | |
| 1982-1984 | No supplier | | |
| 1985 | No supplier | | |
| 1985-1986 | Adidas | | |
| 1987 | Puma | | |
| 1988-1989 | Adidas | | |
| 1990 | Adidas | | |
| 1991 | Kelme | | |
| 1992 | Comba | | |
| 1993-1997 | Umbro | | |
| 1998-2000 | Reebok | | |
| 2001-2002 | Reebok | | |
| 2003-2004 | Lotto | | |
| 2004-2007 | Lotto | | |
| 2007-2009 | Lotto | | |
| 2009-2010 | Lotto | | |
| 2011 ( Provisional ) | Adidas | | |
| 2011-2013 | Adidas | | |
| 2014 ( World Cup ) | Adidas | | |
| 2015 | Adidas | | |
| 2016 ( Centennial Cup America ) | Adidas | | |
| 2017 | Adidas | | |

=== Kit suppliers ===
| Kit provider | Period | Ref |
|---|---|---|
| (France) Le Coq Sportif | 1980–1981 | |
| (West Germany) Adidas | 1985–1986 | |
| (West Germany) Puma | 1987 | |
| (West Germany) Adidas | 1988–1990 | |
| (Spain) Kelme | 1991 | |
| (Colombia) Comba | 1992 | |
| (England) Umbro | 1993–1997 | |
| (England) Reebok | 1998–2002 | |
| (Italy) Lotto | 2003–2010 | |
| (Germany) Adidas | 2011–present | |
