= Rodolfo Torres =

Rodolfo Torres may refer to:

- Rodolfo Torres (footballer) (born 1929), Mexican footballer
- Rodolfo Torres (cyclist) (born 1987), Colombian cyclist
- Rodolfo Torres (swimmer), a Honduran swimmer
- Rodolfo H. Torres, Argentine mathematician
