= Alfredo Piedra =

Costa Rican footballer and manager (1915-2003)

Personal information
- Full name: Alfredo Piedra Mora
- Date of birth: August 16, 1915
- Place of birth: San José, Costa Rica
- Date of death: December 18, 2003 (aged 88)
- Place of death: Rohrmoser, Costa Rica
- Position: Striker

Senior career*
| Years | Team | Apps | (Gls) |
- Orión
- Sociedad Gimnástica
- La Libertad
- Juventud Asturiana

International career
| 1938 | Costa Rica | 1 | (1) |

Managerial career
- 1955–1956: Saprissa
- 1955–1957: Costa Rica
- 1961–1963: Costa Rica
- 1962–1964: Saprissa
- 1965: Costa Rica
- 1966: Herediano
Medal record
Representing Costa Rica
Men's Football
Central American and Caribbean Games
| Silver medal – second place | 1938 Panama | Team competition |
- * Club domestic league appearances and goals

Alfredo Piedra Mora (16 August 1915 – 18 December 2003) was a Costa Rican footballer and manager.

== Playing career ==
=== Club ===
Piedra made his debut for Orión on 24 May 1936 against Herediano, immediately scoring two goals. He went on to win two league titles with them and also played for Sociedad Gimnástica Española, La Libertad (winning another title) and Cuban team Juventud Asturiana.

He was joint league top goalscorer in 1938 with 11 goals and totalled 124 Primera División matches.

=== International ===
He made his debut for Costa Rica playing alongside other Costa Rican greats like Hernán Bolaños and Alejandro Morera Soto in a February 1938 Central American and Caribbean Games match against Panama, scoring a goal in which proved to be his sole international game.

=== International goals ===
Scores and results list Costa Rica's goal tally first.

| N. | Date | Venue | Opponent | Score | Result | Competition |
|---|---|---|---|---|---|---|
| 1. | 15 February 1938 | Estadio Juan Demóstenes Arosemena, Panama City, Panama | Panama | 7-0 | 11–0 | Central American and Caribbean Games |

=== Managerial ===
As a manager, Piedra was in charge of teams like Orión, Saprissa (twice), Alajuelense (also twice), Cartaginés (5 times), Barrio México, Herediano, San Ramón, San Carlos, Puntarenas, Rohrmoser and in Mexico with Monarcas Morelia. He also managed the national team on three occasions, winning the 1963 CONCACAF Championship.

In total, Piedra was in charge at 356 Primera División matches and 49 times with the national team.

== Achievements ==
As player

- League title - Orión (1938, 1944) (top goalscorer in 1938)
- League title - La Libertad (1946)
- Central American and Caribbean Games Silver Medal (1): 1938

As manager

- League title - Saprissa (1962)
- 1955 CCCF Championship - Costa Rica
- 1963 CONCACAF Championship - Costa Rica
