= Football at the 1938 Central American and Caribbean Games =

Tournament details
- Host country: Panama
- Dates: 10–23 February
- Teams: 6 (from 2 confederations)
- Venue(s): 1 (in 1 host city)

Final positions
- Champions: Mexico (2nd title)
- Runners-up: Costa Rica
- Third place: Colombia
- Fourth place: El Salvador

Tournament statistics
- Matches played: 15
- Goals scored: 67 (4.47 per match)
- Top scorer(s): (Costa Rica) Hernán Bolaños

The football tournament at the 1938 Central American and Caribbean Games was held in Panama City from 10 to 23 February.

The gold medal was won by Mexico for the second time, who earned 9 points.

== Participants ==
- Colombia
- Costa Rica
- El Salvador
- Mexico
- Panama (Hosts)
- Venezuela

== Table ==
2 points system used.

Pos	Team	Pld	W	D	L	GF	GA	GD	Pts
1	Mexico (C)	5	4	1	0	14	4	+10	9
2	Costa Rica	5	4	0	1	24	3	+21	8
3	Colombia	5	2	0	3	10	11	−1	4
4	El Salvador	5	2	0	3	7	19	−12	4
5	Panama	5	1	1	3	8	20	−12	3
6	Venezuela	5	1	0	4	5	11	−6	2

(C) Champions

== Results ==
10 February 1938

Mexico	3–1	Colombia
Argüelles 40' de la Fuente 77' (pen.); Casarín 81'	Report	Mejía 4'

Estadio Olímpico Nacional, Panama City
Attendance: 20,000
Referee: Rafael Mirabal (Uruguay)

12 February 1938

Costa Rica	7–0	El Salvador
H. Bolaños 5', 55', 83'; Morera 16', 42'; Hütt 57'; Rojas 65'	Report

Estadio Olímpico Nacional, Panama City

12 February 1938

Panama	2–1	Venezuela
Anderson 65', 85'	Report	Ríos 90'

Estadio Olímpico Nacional, Panama City
Attendance: 15,000

14 February 1938

Panama	2–4	Colombia
Anderson 27', 59'	Report	Meléndez 57', 82'; Torres 75', 89'

Estadio Olímpico Nacional, Panama City

14 February 1938

Mexico	1–0	Venezuela
Pría 4'	Report

Estadio Olímpico Nacional, Panama City
Attendance: 10,000
Referee: Pablo Ferre Elías (Spain)

16 February 1938

Panama	0–11	Costa Rica
	Report	Hütt 5'; H. Bolaños 14', 15', 23', 43', 59'; Piedra 17', 33'; Morera 30', 38'; Pinnock 65' (o.g.)

Estadio Olímpico Nacional, Panama City
Attendance: 20,000

16 February 1938

El Salvador	3–2	Venezuela
Contreras 5'; Cruz 14'; F. Martínez 78'	Report	Febres 47'; Marcano 67'

Estadio Olímpico Nacional, Panama City

18 February 1938

Colombia	1–2	Costa Rica
Mejía 29'	Report	H. Bolaños 5'; Morera 43' (pen.)

Estadio Olímpico Nacional, Panama City

Abandoned at 1–2 in 69' when Colombia walked off because of a penalty award against them; Alejandro Morera scored for Costa Rica against an empty goal, but result counted as 1–2.

18 February 1938

Mexico	6–0	El Salvador
de la Fuente 18'; Argüelles 37'; Cortina 50', 55'; Casarín 61', 66'	Report

Estadio Olímpico Nacional, Panama City
Attendance: 10,000
Referee: Rafael Mirabal (Uruguay)

20 February 1938

Panama	2–2	Mexico
Prado 61'; Anderson 65' (pen.)	Report	de la Fuente 46'; Casarín 62'

Estadio Olímpico Nacional, Panama City
Attendance: 20,000
Referee: Rafael Mirabal (Uruguay)

20 February 1938

Venezuela	0–3	Costa Rica
	Report	H. Bolaños 18'; Ó. Bolaños 40'; Hütt 63'

Estadio Olímpico Nacional, Panama City

21 February 1938

Colombia	3–2	El Salvador
Meléndez 10', 30'; Mejía 55'	Report	Cuéllar Cruz 32'; F. Martínez 50'

Estadio Olímpico Nacional, Panama City

22 February 1938

Mexico	2–1	Costa Rica
Casarín 5', 59'	Report	Muñoz 20'

Estadio Olímpico Nacional, Panama City
Attendance: 25,000
Referee: Rafael Mirabal (Uruguay)

23 February 1938

Venezuela	2–1	Colombia
Ríos 43', 70' (pen.)	Report	Mejía 18'

Estadio Olímpico Nacional, Panama City

23 February 1938

Panama	1–2	El Salvador
Castro ?' (o.g.)	Report	Contreras ?'; F. Martínez ?'

Estadio Olímpico Nacional, Panama City

1938 Central American
and Caribbean Games

Mexico
2nd title

== Statistics ==
=== Goalscorers ===
There were 67 goals scored in 15 matches, for an average of 4.47 goals per match.

10 goals

- (Costa Rica) Hernán Bolaños

6 goals

- (Mexico) Horacio Casarín

5 goals

- (Costa Rica) Alejandro Morera Soto
- (Panama) James Santiago Anderson

4 goals

- (Colombia) Roberto Meléndez

3 goals

- (Colombia) Marcos Mejía
- (Costa Rica) José Hütt
- (El Salvador) Francisco Martínez
- (Mexico) Luis de la Fuente
- (Venezuela) Fernando Ríos

2 goals

- (Costa Rica) Alfredo Piedra Mora
- (Colombia) José Torres
- (El Salvador) Alejandro Contreras
- (Mexico) Luis Argüelles
- (Mexico) Luis García Cortina

1 goal

- (Colombia) Rafael Mejía
- (Costa Rica) José Luis Rojas
- (Costa Rica) Óscar Bolaños
- (Costa Rica) Rodolfo Butch Muñoz
- (El Salvador) Miguel Cruz
- (El Salvador) Noel Cuéllar Cruz
- (Mexico) Manuel Alonso Pría
- (Panama) Pablo Prado
- (Venezuela) Francisco Marcano
- (Venezuela) Reinaldo Febres

1 own goal

- (Panama) George Pinnock (against Costa Rica)
- (Panama) Raúl Castro (against El Salvador)

=== Team of the Tournament ===
Ideal XI by RSSSF
Goalkeeper	Defenders	Midfielders	Forwards
(Costa Rica) Mario Jones	(Mexico) Antonio Azpiri (Costa Rica) Milton Valverde (Colombia) Severino Lugo	(Mexico) Guillermo Ortega (Costa Rica) Rodolfo Muñoz	(Colombia) Roberto Meléndez (Costa Rica) Alejandro Morera (Panama) James Anderson (Mexico) Horacio Casarín (Costa Rica) Oscar Bolaños
