= Alejandro Morera =

Costa Rican footballer (1909-1995)

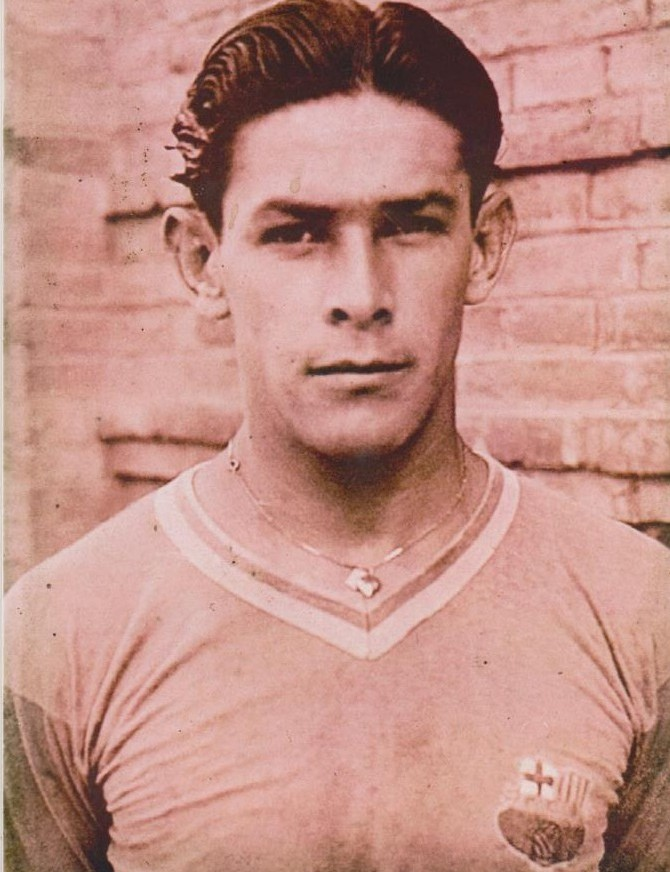
- Morera with Barcelona in 1934

Personal information
- Full name: Alejandro Morera Soto
- Date of birth: July 14, 1909
- Place of birth: Alajuela, Costa Rica
- Date of death: March 26, 1995 (aged 85)
- Height: 1.65 m (5 ft 5 in)
- Position: Striker

Youth career
- Alajuelense

Senior career*
Years	Team	Apps	(Gls)
1925–1927	Alajuelense	47	(41)
1927–1928	Centro Gallego	19	(21)
1928–1932	Alajuelense	144	(136)
1933	Espanyol	3	(3)
1933–1935	Barcelona	76	(63)
1935–1936	Hércules	18	(9)
1936	Le Havre	2	(3)
1936–1947	Alajuelense	364	(312)
Total		673	(584)

International career
1938–1943	Costa Rica	7	(6)

Managerial career
- 1941: Costa Rica (player-manager)
- 1943: Costa Rica (player-manager)
- * Club domestic league appearances and goals

Alejandro Morera Soto (July 14, 1909 – March 26, 1995) was a Costa Rican professional footballer who played as a striker mostly for Alajuelense in the Costa Rican Primera División. He is considered one of the best and most talented players of all time in Costa Rica.

"El fenómeno costarricense" ("The Costa Rican phenomenon"), as he was dubbed by the press in Catalonia, Spain, where he was part of FC Barcelona. He was known to most as "El Mago del balon" (The Ball Magician) he was of small stature but a powerful striker. His stint with Barcelona made Morera the first Costa Rican to play in La Liga.

== Club career ==
In 1925 at the early age of 16, he made his debut with Alajuelense in the Costa Rican premier league Primera División in a match against Sociedad Gimnástica Española. Soon afterwards he became the star player and team's captain, showing a quality game and scoring many goals. These attributes opened doors beyond the country, initially in Cuba at Centro Gallego in 1927. He thereafter returned to Alajuelense and in 1928 helped the team obtain its first national championship, Morera scoring four goals in the last match against Herediano and becoming the top scorer with 26 goals. He led as the team's outstanding player during Alajuelense's tours of Mexico (1931) and Perú (1932), where he received accolades for his playing ability.

=== Spain ===
In February 1933 he was invited to Spain by former Real Club Deportivo Español player Ricardo Saprissa for a tryout with Español. The Barcelona newspaper Mundo Deportivo (28/02/1968 page 8) reported that Morera had wanted to play for FC Barcelona rather than Espanyol and was able with the assistance of Sr. Esteban Sala, a club director and Sr.Gispert, also club director whom he had befriended during the ocean crossing to personally negotiate, after a successful tryout with the club's coach, a three-year contract directly with FC Barcelona's president, Joan Coma Segarrols.

Thus Morera made his debut with Catalonia's foremost club on May 18, 1933, in a match against Tenerife, and scored 2 goals in a 3 to 1 win. One of his best remembered strikes was scoring his team's only goal in September of that year versus Real Madrid, beating Spain's fabled and Europe's best goalkeeper Ricardo Zamora "El Divino" in a 2 to 1 loss. The 1933–34 season was his most successful, scoring 41 goals becoming the team's top scorer. FC Barcelona won the 1934 championship of Catalonia but only placed ninth place in the league. The 1934–35 season was also successful, playing 24 games and scoring 12 goals, and FCB placed sixth in the Spanish league championship. Altogether Morera played 76 games and scored 68 goals for FC Barcelona, a very high output. His scoring record: 39 goals in friendlies; 13 goals in the Spanish League; 11 goals in the Catalan Championship and 5 goals in the Spanish Cup.

Against fan opposition he was sold for a sum of 10,000 pesetas to Hércules Alicante, a recently promoted club in Alicante. In his first year, he helped the upstart team obtain the league's sixth place ahead of six other teams with the same number of points as FC Barcelona, who finished fifth due to better goal average. While playing for FC Barcelona, he fully identified with Catalonia, even being named to the Catalan regional team and playing two games against Brazil, scoring goals in both matches.

With outbreak of Spain's civil war, he was forced to return to his homeland. He was unable to withdraw his money from the bank; the smaller amount of money he had on hand he chose to place in a coffer which was lost. With the urgent need to return to Costa Rica but with empty pockets, he briefly offered his services to the French team Le Havre, played two games and in usual fashion scored two goals for them.

=== Return to Liga ===
He arrived back in Costa Rica in November 1936 where he was to continue his outstanding career. Again he joined Alajuelense obtaining another championship in 1939 won when he scored a hat trick in the final match against Herediano. He also became the league's top goalscorer again. One more championship, this time undefeated, a record title came in 1941. The last title came in 1945, where he performed in a dual role as a coach-player. He played his last match April 6, 1947, against Municipal Lima.

== Retirement ==
Morera continued as a coach until March 1949. He also managed the national team.

After retiring from sports he was voted a member of the country's legislature for his native province of Alajuela (1958–1962), where he also later served as Mayor and Governor.

== International career ==
Morera made his debut for Costa Rica against El Salvador in February 1938 and won 5 caps, scoring 4 goals during the 1938 Central American and Caribbean Games or scored 6 in 7 international matches.

=== International goals ===
Scores and results list Costa Rica's goal tally first.

N.	Date	Venue	Opponent	Score	Result	Competition
1.	12 February 1938	Estadio Juan Demóstenes Arosemena, Panama City, Panama	El Salvador		7–0	Central American and Caribbean Games
2.	12 February 1938	Estadio Juan Demóstenes Arosemena, Panama City, Panama	El Salvador		7–0	Central American and Caribbean Games
3.	16 February 1938	Estadio Juan Demóstenes Arosemena, Panama City, Panama	Panama		11–0	Central American and Caribbean Games
4.	22 February 1938	Estadio Juan Demóstenes Arosemena, Panama City, Panama	Mexico		1–2	Central American and Caribbean Games

== Personal life, death and legacy ==
Morera Soto was a son of Juan Morera Miranda and Eufemia Soto Soto and had 4 sisters and a brother. He married Julia Pacheco Pérez in 1937 and they had a daughter and 5 grandchildren.

He died March 26, 1995, at the age of 85. He is remembered by both Manudos (fans of Alajuelense), and Ticos (Costa Ricans) alike as a man who loved his team and as one who gave many victories and much joy to fans across the country.

Alajuelense's stadium, where his heart was emtombed in a monument below the East section seats, was named after him. In 1998, he was voted Costa Rica's player of the century by the IFFHS.
