= Federico Pizarro =

Federico Pizarro may refer to:

- Federico Pizarro (footballer) (1927–2003), Argentine footballer
- Federico Pizarro (handballer) (born 1986), Argentine handball player
