= Sarará (disambiguation) =

Sarará may refer to:

- Mateus Sarará (born 2002), Brazilian professional footballer
- Sarará (footballer) (1931–2013), former Brazilian professional footballer
