= Luis de la Fuente (footballer, born 1914) =

Mexican footballer

Personal information
- Full name: Luis de la Fuente y Hoyos
- Date of birth: 17 January 1914
- Place of birth: Veracruz, Mexico
- Date of death: 28 May 1972 (aged 58)
- Position: Midfielder

Youth career
- Aurrerá

Senior career*
Years	Team	Apps	(Gls)
1930–1931	Aurrerá		
1931–1934	Real España		
1934–1935	Racing Santander	20	(5)
1935–1937	Real España		
1937–1938	América		
1938–1939	Real España		
1939–1940	Corrales		
1940–1941	Vélez Sarsfield	16	(8)
1941–1943	Marte		
1943–1952	Veracruz		

International career
1934–1950	Mexico	9	(7)
Medal record
Representing Mexico
Men's Football
Central American and Caribbean Games
Gold medal – first place	1938 Panama	Team competition
- * Club domestic league appearances and goals

Luis de la Fuente y Hoyos (17 January 1914 – 28 May 1972) was a Mexican professional footballer who played as a midfielder.

Nicknamed "The Pirate", de la Fuente is considered one of the best Mexican—and North American—midfielders of all time, having being named to the IFFHS World Team for CONCACAF in 2021.

== Early life ==
Born in Veracruz in 1914, de la Fuente was the first of four children of a father from Asturias and a mother from Santander Province, Spain. Shortly after he was born, de la Fuente's parents fled Veracruz after the United States seized the port city. The family would return to Veracruz but de la Fuente's father died when he was still young. His mother sent him to live with relatives in Santander for his primary education, but at age 10 he returned to his mother who sent him to study in Tacubaya, Mexico City where he would first play organized football.

The director of local side C.F. Aurrerá noticed de la Fuente's emerging football talent and eventually he dropped out of school to sign with the club.

== Career ==
At the age of 15, de la Fuente made his competitive debut for Aurrerá in a 1929 cup match against Club Necaxa. He played for the club in the Primera Fuerza for two seasons, then joined Real Club España for the 1932–33 season. The following season, De la Fuente helped España win the championship.

De la Fuente's performances earned him a place on the Mexico national team at the 1934 FIFA World Cup qualification rounds. The team was eliminated after losing to the United States in the last round of qualifiers, after which it embarked on a European tour where de la Fuente started in a set of club friendlies. His performance with the national team attracted the interested of Spanish club Racing de Santander, who ended up signing him in 1934. After the Spanish Civil War broke out, he returned to Mexico to play for RC España and then Club América.

In 1939, the Paraguayan team Atlético Corrales embarked on a Latin American tour and visited Mexico with a squad composed of great players and, during their exhibition games in Mexico, they decided to sign De La Fuente. He played for Atlético Corrales for over a year and then signed for Vélez Sarsfield from Argentina before returning to Mexico to play for Marte.

Finally, in 1943, he signed with his native state team Tiburones Rojos of CD Veracruz. At CD Veracruz he was part of the team that won two Primera División de México championships in 1945 and 1949. De la Fuente was the first Mexican-born person to play in four countries (Mexico, Spain, Paraguay and Argentina).

De La Fuente retired on June 13, 1954.

== Personal life and death ==
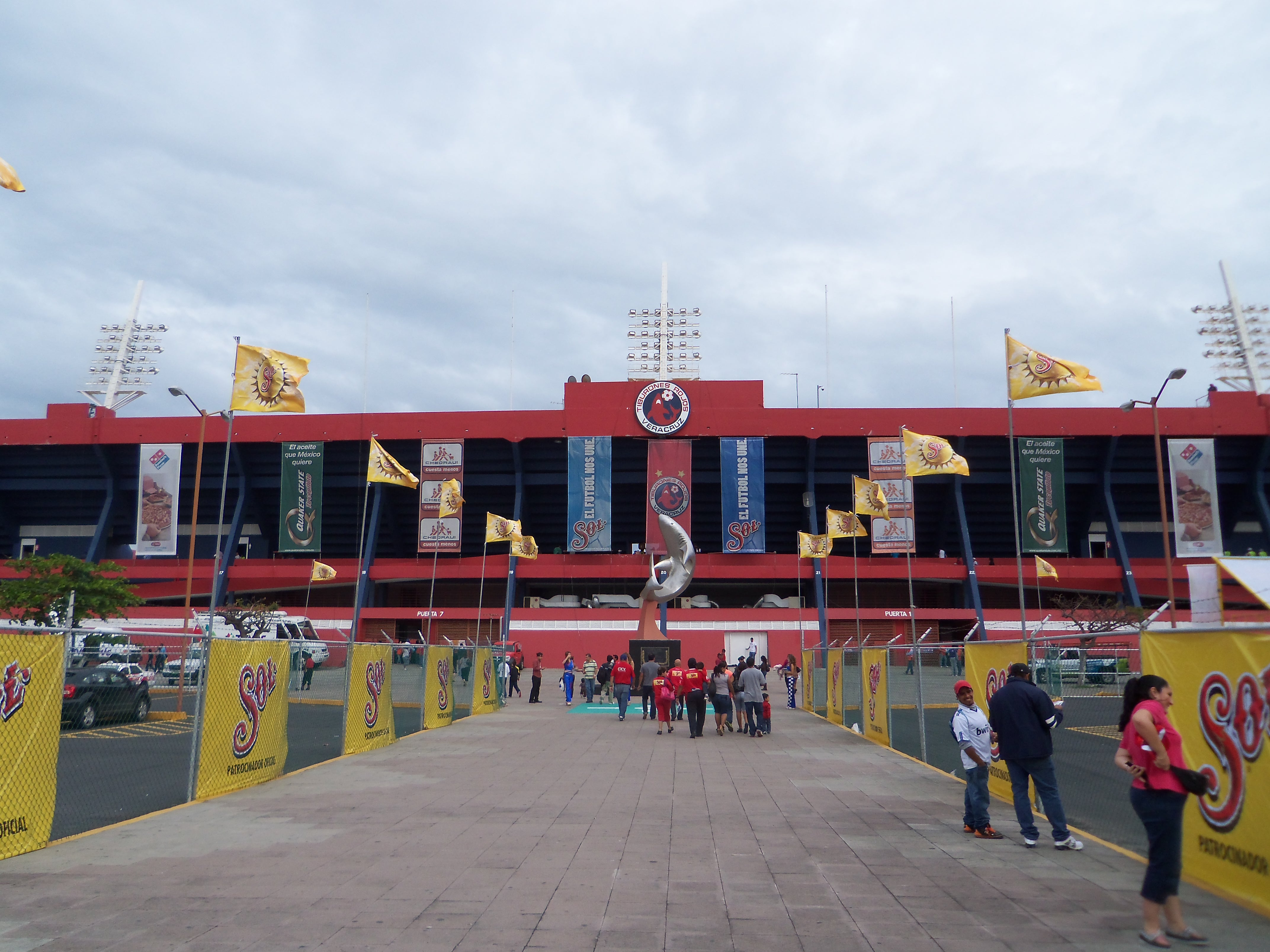
Estadio Luis "Pirata" Fuente in Veracruz

De la Fuente died in 1972 of a heart attack and is buried in Veracruz, facing the Estadio Luis "Pirata" Fuente which carries his name.

== Career statistics ==
=== International ===
No.	Date	Venue	Opponent	Score	Result	Competition
1.	10 February 1938	Panama City, Panama	Colombia	2–1	3–1	1938 Central American and Caribbean Games
2.	18 February 1938	Panama City, Panama	El Salvador	1–0	6–0	1938 Central American and Caribbean Games
3.	20 February 1938	Panama City, Panama	Panama	1–0	2–2	1938 Central American and Caribbean Games
4.	4 September 1946	Mexico City, Mexico	United States	3–0	6–0	1950 FIFA World Cup qualification
5.	4 September 1946	Mexico City, Mexico	United States	4–0	6–0	1950 FIFA World Cup qualification
6.	4 September 1946	Mexico City, Mexico	United States	5–0	6–0	1950 FIFA World Cup qualification
7.	18 September 1946	Mexico City, Mexico	United States	4–0	5–2	1950 FIFA World Cup qualification

== Honours ==
Individual

- IFFHS CONCACAF Men's Team of All Time: 2021
- IFFHS Men's All Time Mexico Dream Team
