= Roberto Meléndez =

Colombian footballer and manager (1912-2000)

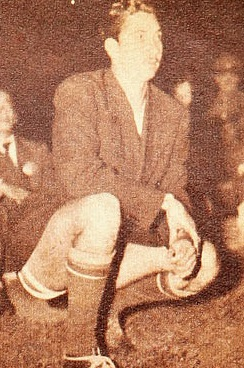

Personal information
- Full name: Roberto Meléndez Lara
- Date of birth: 31 March 1912
- Place of birth: Barranquilla, Colombia
- Date of death: 20 May 2000 (aged 88)
- Place of death: Barranquilla, Colombia
- Position: Forward

Senior career*
Years	Team	Apps	(Gls)
1930–1939	Junior		
1939	Centro Gallego		
1940–1947	Junior		

International career
1938–1947	Colombia		

Managerial career
- 1945: Colombia
- 1948: Junior
Medal record
Representing Colombia
Men's Football
Central American and Caribbean Games
Bronze medal – third place	1938 Panama	Team competition
- * Club domestic league appearances and goals

Roberto Meléndez Lara, nicknamed El Flaco, (born in Barranquilla, 31 March 1912 - died 20 May 2000) was a Colombian football player and coach who played in the 1930s and 1940s, in the amateur era of the sport.

As a player, Melendez played primarily as a forward. He was a player for Barranquilla Juventud Junior who, in large part due to his efforts, became the most powerful amateur club in Colombia during that period. He was the first Colombian player to play for a foreign team in 1939 when was hired by the team 'Hispano Centro Gallego' in Cuba. When playing, he was considered the best Colombian footballer of his era.

Meléndez was also head coach of the Colombia national team and coached them to a fifth-place finish in the Copa América 1945 and in 1947 to an 8th-place finish. He was also head coach of Atletico Junior in the early 1940s, who were runners-up in the first championship league football in 1948. Meléndez died on 20 May 2000.

The Barranquilla main metropolitan stadium Estadio Metropolitano Roberto Meléndez was officially renamed after Meléndez, on the initiative of journalist Chelo de Castro on 17 March 1991.

== Honours ==
International

- Central American and Caribbean Games Bronze Medal (1): 1938
