= Horacio Casarín =

Mexican footballer (1918–2005)

Personal information
- Full name: Horacio Casarín Garcilazo
- Date of birth: 25 May 1918
- Place of birth: Mexico City, Mexico
- Date of death: 10 April 2005 (aged 86)
- Place of death: Mexico City, Mexico
- Height: 1.73 m (5 ft 8 in)
- Position: Forward

Senior career*
Years	Team	Apps	(Gls)
1936–1942	Necaxa		(53)
1942–1948	Atlante		(107)
1948–1950	Barcelona		
1950	Real Club España		(21)
1950–1951	Necaxa		(17)
1951	Veracruz		
1951–1953	Zacatepec		(24)
1953–1955	Atlante		
1955–1956	América		(13)
1956–1957	Monterrey		(3)

International career
1937–1956	Mexico	16	(15)

Managerial career
- 1978–1979: Zacatepec
- 1979: Tecos UAG
- 1981–1984: Atlante
Medal record
Representing Mexico
Men's Football
Central American and Caribbean Games
Gold medal – first place	1938 Panama	Team competition
- * Club domestic league appearances and goals

Horacio Casarín Garcilazo (25 May 1918 – 10 April 2005) was a Mexican professional football player and coach who established himself as one of his country's most popular sports figures in the 1940s and 1950s.

A symbol for Atlante, the team Casarín served for the majority of his career, the skilled forward also played for Necaxa, León, Asturias, Club América, Real España, Monterrey and Zacatepec in his country, as well as FC Barcelona in Spain and the Mexico national team.

== Club career ==
At age 17, Casarín debuted for Necaxa. Over the course of his career in Mexico, Casarín scored 236 goals at the amateur and professional levels (the Mexican League was founded in the early 1940s) and represented his country at the 1950 FIFA World Cup held in Brazil and scored a goal against Switzerland in the tournament. A well-known anecdote involving Casarín takes place during a 1939 game between Casarin's Necaxa, and Asturias. After scoring a goal in the first few minutes of the game, defenders sought out Casarín and fouled him mercilessly, until the goalscorer was forced to leave the pitch after only twenty minutes had been played. The game ended in a 2–2 draw, but outraged Necaxa fans expressed their ire by burning Asturia's wooden stadium.

With Atlante, Casarín scored 95 goals and helped the Potros win the 1946–47 season championship, while cementing his popularity by acting in the football-themed movie, "The sons of Don Venacio". Word of Casarín's role in the film spread, and the movie became a box-office success in Mexico. Casarín played his last game as a professional on 18 November 1956, scoring a goal for CF Monterrey. He scored 174 goals in the Primera División during his career.

== International career ==
Casarín scored 15 goals for the Mexico national team between 1937 and 1956.

== Managerial career ==
As a coach, Casarín's biggest achievement was coaching the Mexican U-20 national football team to a second-place finish in the inaugural FIFA U-20 World Cup in Tunisia in 1977. Casarín's squad lost the final game 9–8 in penalty kicks against the USSR. He also coached Atlante and Tecos UAG.

== Death ==
Casarín's failing health finally gave out on 10 April 2005, only a few months after his wife, Maria Elena King, had died. He died of complications arising from Alzheimer's disease.
