= Pedro López (footballer, born 1912) =

Colombian footballer and manager

Personal information
- Full name: Pedro Ricardo López
- Date of birth: 1912
- Place of birth: Valle del Cauca
- Date of death: 17 June 2006 (aged 94)
- Position: Defender

Senior career*
Years	Team	Apps	(Gls)
193?–194?	Boca Juniors de Cali		
195?	Deportivo Pasto		

International career
1938–1945	Colombia		

Managerial career
- 1950: Deportivo Pasto
- 1956: Valle del Cauca
- 1957: Colombia
- Cortuluá
- * Club domestic league appearances and goals

Pedro Ricardo López (Valle del Cauca, 1912 - 17 June 2006) was a Colombian football defender and manager. He competed for the Colombia national football team at the 1938 Bolivarian Games and 1945 South American Championship.
