= Rodolfo H. Torres =

Argentine American mathematician

Rodolfo Humberto Torres is an Argentinian American mathematician specializing in harmonic analysis who works as the Vice Chancellor for Research and Economic Development and a Distinguished Professor of Mathematics at the University of California, Riverside.

Torres did his undergraduate studies at the National University of Rosario in Argentina, completing a licenciatura there in 1984. He earned his doctorate in 1989 from Washington University in St. Louis, with a dissertation entitled On the Boundedness of Certain Operators with Singular Kernels on Distribution Spaces and supervised by Björn D. Jawerth. In 2012 he became one of the inaugural fellows of the American Mathematical Society. He was named a Distinguished Professor in 2016.

As well as his work in pure mathematics, Torres has also published works on light scattering mechanisms for the colorings of birds and insects.
