= Carlos Cubillos =

Chilean footballer (1929–2003)

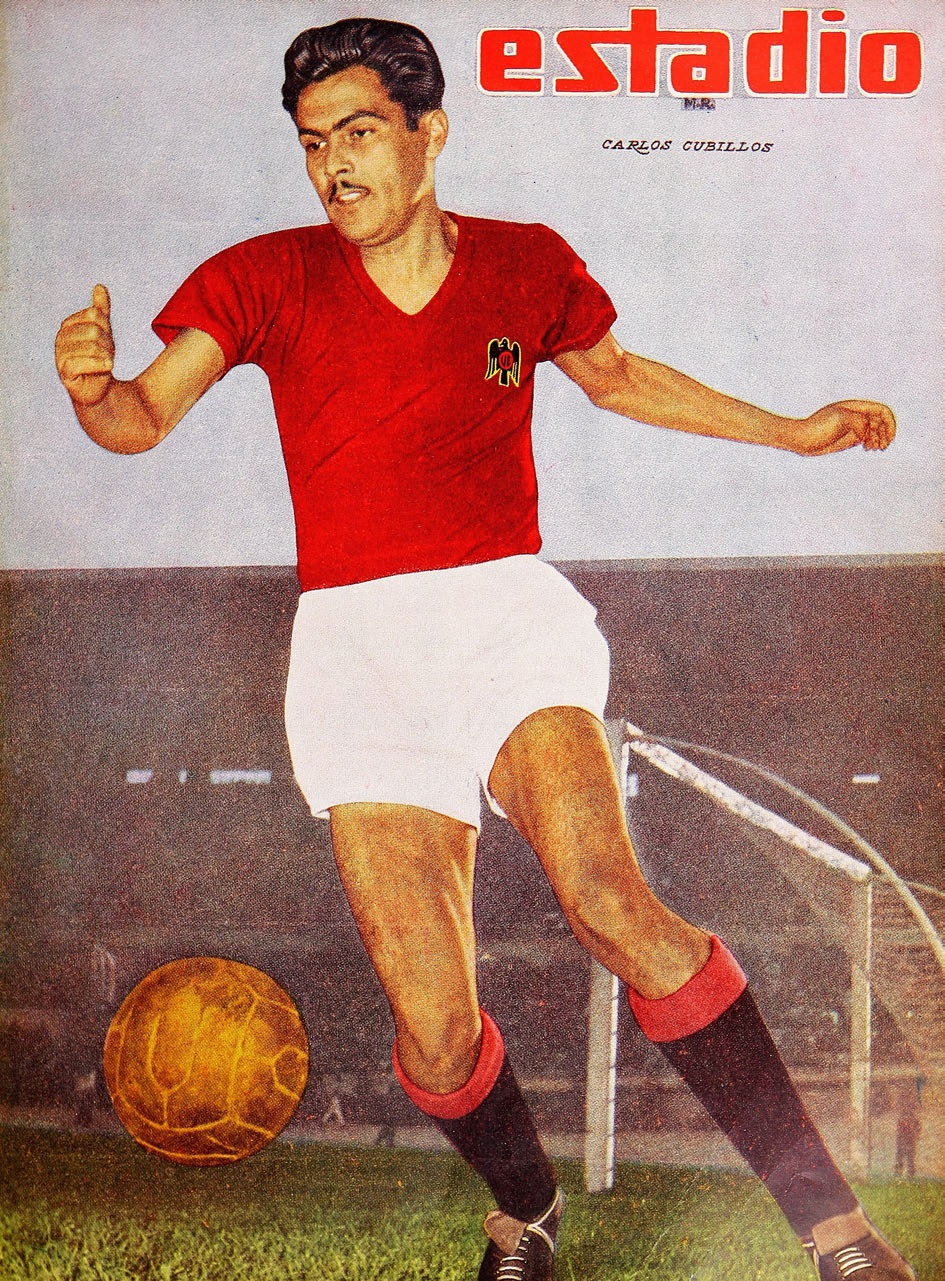

Personal information
- Date of birth: 26 November 1929
- Date of death: 22 September 2003 (aged 73)
- Position: Midfielder

International career
Years	Team	Apps	(Gls)
1955–1957	Chile	15	(0)

Carlos Cubillos (26 December 1929 – 22 September 2003) was a Chilean footballer. He played in 15 matches for the Chile national football team from 1955 to 1957. He was also part of Chile's squad for the 1956 South American Championship.
