= Luis Raúl Cardoso =

Argentine footballer (1930–2017)

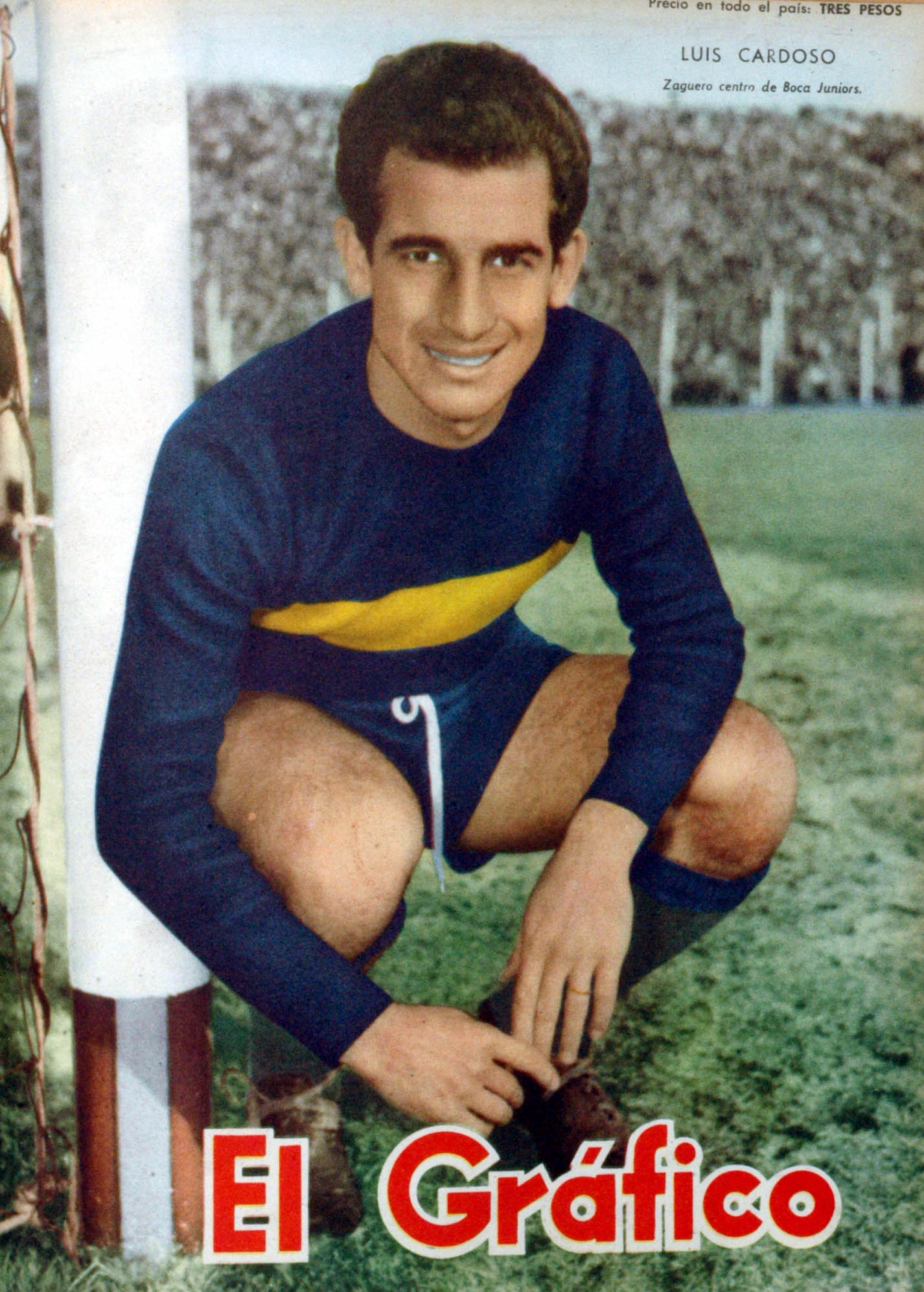

Personal information
- Date of birth: 18 July 1930
- Date of death: 28 March 2017 (aged 86)
- Position: Defender

International career
Years	Team	Apps	(Gls)
1956–1959	Argentina	7	(0)

Luis Raúl Cardoso (18 July 1930 – 28 March 2017) was an Argentine footballer. He played in seven matches for the Argentina national football team from 1956 to 1959. He was also part of Argentina's squad for the 1959 South American Championship that took place in Argentina.

Cardoso died on 28 March 2017, at the age of 86.

== Honours ==
Tampico

- Copa MX: 1960-61

Argentina

- Copa América: 1959
