= Rigoberto Felandro =

Peruvian footballer and manager (1924–1990)

Personal information
- Full name: Rigoberto Felandro Vásquez
- Date of birth: 4 January 1924
- Place of birth: Lima, Peru
- Date of death: 6 September 1990 (aged 66)
- Height: 1.76 m (5 ft 9 in)
- Position: Goalkeeper

Senior career*
Years	Team	Apps	(Gls)
1940–1943	Sport Vitarte		
1944–1946	Santiago Barranco		
1947–1949	Sport Boys		
1950–1952	América de Cali		
1953	Litoral SC		
1954–1957	Sport Boys		
1958–1963	Deportivo Municipal		
1964	KDT Nacional		

International career
1956–1961	Peru	8	(0)

Managerial career
- 1974: Carlos A. Mannucci
- 1977: Cienciano
- 1978: Sport Áncash
- * Club domestic league appearances and goals

Rigoberto Felandro Vásquez (4 January 1924 – 6 September 1990) was a Peruvian football manager and former player.

== Playing career ==
=== Club career ===
Rigoberto Felandro began his career with Sport Vitarte in 1940. In 1947, he joined Sport Boys of Callao and played his first match there on 18 May 1947, against Alianza Lima (a 2–2 draw).

Competing with Rafael Asca, Felandro moved to Colombia in 1950 to play for América de Cali, where he reunited with some of his compatriots (Carlos Gómez Sánchez and Alejandro González, among others). He remained there until 1952, and after a brief stint in Venezuela (with Litoral FC) in 1953, he returned to Sport Boys and played there until 1957.

In 1958, he signed with Deportivo Municipal and stayed for five seasons. He retired from KDT Nacional in 1964, at the age of 40.

=== International career ===
Peruvian international Rigoberto Felandro received eight caps for the national team between 1956 and 1961 (13 goals conceded). He notably participated in the 1956 Panamerican Championship in Mexico (five matches), followed by the 1957 South American Championship, hosted by Peru, where he took part in two matches.

== Managerial career ==
Having become a coach, Felandro had a rather short career which saw him on the bench of Carlos A. Mannucci in 1974 and Cienciano in 1977.

== Death ==
Rigoberto Felandro died on 6 September 1990 at the age of 66.

== Honours ==
=== Player ===
Santiago Barranco

- Peruvian Segunda División: 1945
