= Luis Pentrelli =

Argentine footballer (1932–2017)

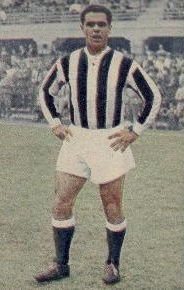

Personal information
- Date of birth: 15 June 1932
- Date of death: October 2017 (aged 85)
- Position: Midfielder

International career
Years	Team	Apps	(Gls)
1956	Argentina	7	(0)

Luis Pentrelli (15 June 1932 – October 2017) was an Argentine footballer. He played in seven matches for the Argentina national football team in 1956. He was also part of Argentina's squad for the 1956 South American Championship. Pentrelli died in October 2017, at the age of 85.
