= Sergio Goity =

Chilean footballer (1930-1980)

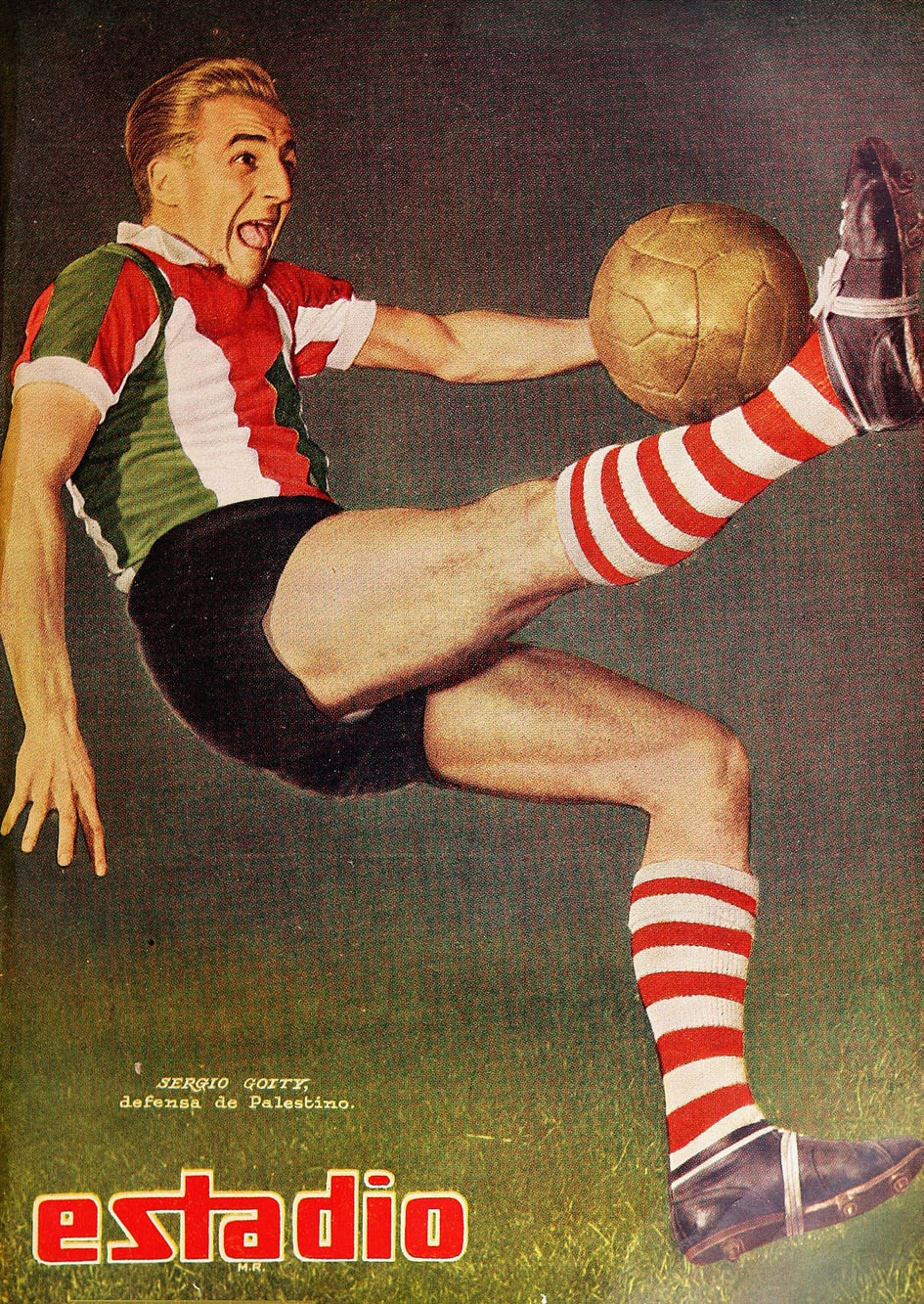
- Goity with Palestino in 1953

Personal information
- Full name: Sergio Washington Goity Klagges
- Date of birth: 21 February 1930
- Date of death: 23 April 1980 (aged 50)
- Position: Defender

Senior career*
Years	Team	Apps	(Gls)
- Ferrobádminton
- Palestino
1960–1963	Deportes Temuco		

International career
1956	Chile	4	(0)
- * Club domestic league appearances and goals

Sergio Washington Goity Klagges (21 February 1930 – 23 April 1980) was a Chilean footballer. He played in three matches for the Chile national football team in 1956. He was also part of Chile's squad for the 1956 South American Championship.

== Legacy ==
Constituted on 10 February 1960, Goity was a leadership member of the Unión de Jugadores Profesionales (Union of Professional Football Players) in Chile.
