= Rodolfo Torres (footballer) =

Mexican footballer (born 1929)

Personal information
- Full name: Rodolfo Torres Ruiz
- Date of birth: May 5, 1929 (age 97)
- Place of birth: Mexico City, Mexico
- Height: 1.68 m (5 ft 6 in)
- Position: Defender

Senior career*
Years	Team	Apps	(Gls)
1946–1948	Club Deportivo Marte		
1948–1955	Puebla FC		
1955–957	Deportivo Irapuato		
- * Club domestic league appearances and goals

Rodolfo Torres Ruiz was a Mexican footballer who played in the Mexican Primera Division in the mid-1940s to the late 1950s with clubs Club Marte, Puebla FC, Deportivo Irapuato. He played with Puebla for 7 years in which in 1953 helped the club win the Copa Mexico.
