= Federico Pizarro (footballer) =

Argentine footballer

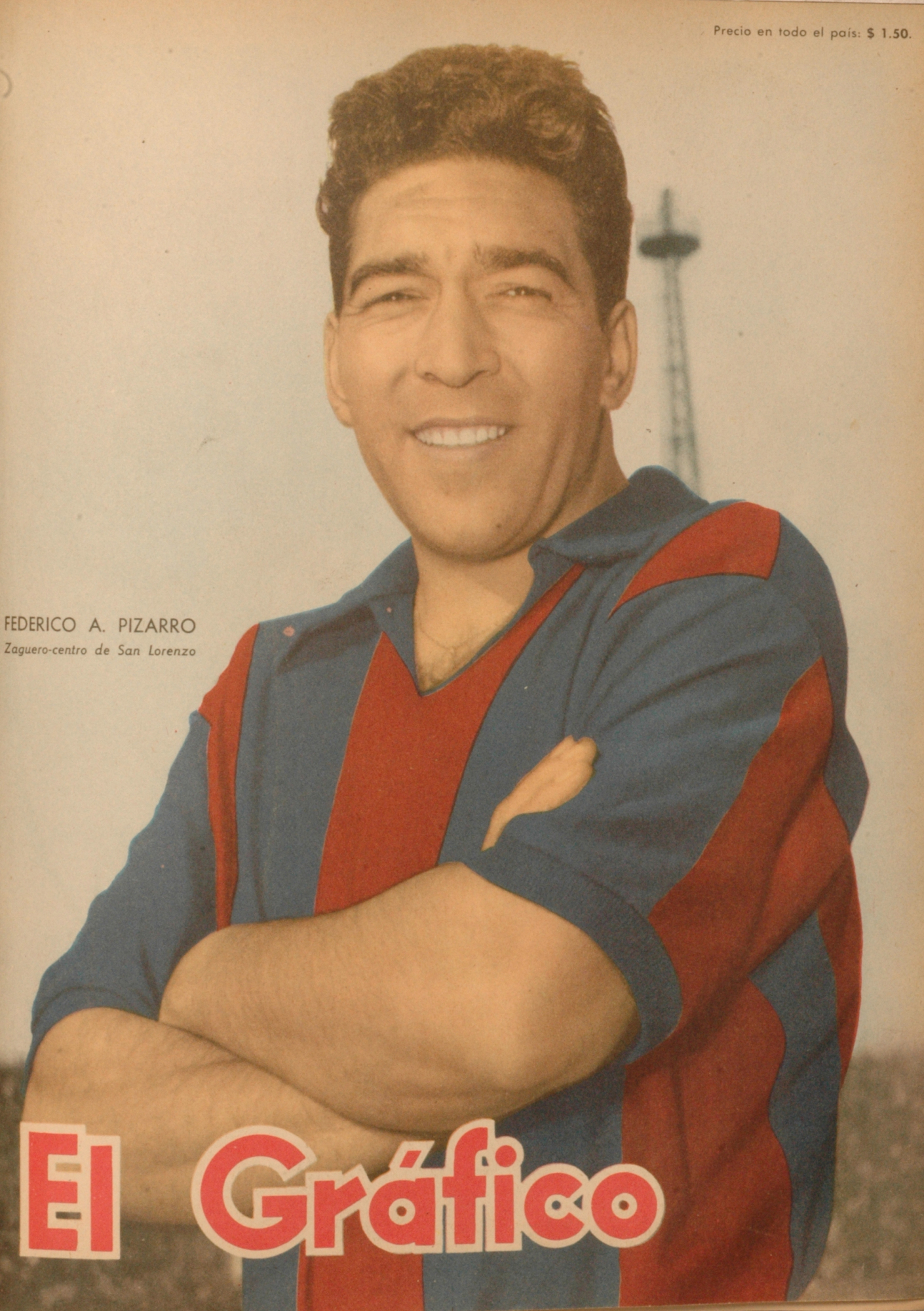
- Pizarro on the cover of El Gráfico in 1955

Personal information
- Full name: Federico Antonio Pizarro
- Date of birth: 1 January 1927
- Place of birth: Buenos Aires, Argentina
- Date of death: 5 April 2003 (aged 76)
- Place of death: Buenos Aires, Argentina
- Position: Defender

Senior career*
Years	Team	Apps	(Gls)
1947–1954	Chacarita Juniors	212	(12)
1955–1957	San Lorenzo	73	(0)
1958	Huracán	19	(0)
1959	Chacarita Juniors	4	(0)
1960	Magallanes		

International career
1954–1957	Argentina	7	(0)

Managerial career
- 1962: Flandria
- 1963: Estudiantes BA
- 1969: Chacarita Juniors
- 1969: Comunicaciones
- Argentino de Quilmes
- Tigre
- Deportivo Armenio
- Gimnasia La Plata
- Sarmiento de Junín
- Deportivo Español
- Atlanta
- * Club domestic league appearances and goals

Federico Antonio Pizarro (January 1, 1927, in Buenos Aires, Argentina – April 5, 2003, in Buenos Aires, Argentina) was an Argentine international footballer who played for clubs of Argentina and Chile. He played for the Argentina national football team in the Copa América Peru 1957.

== Teams ==
- (Argentina) Chacarita Juniors 1947–1954
- (Argentina) San Lorenzo 1955–1957
- (Argentina) Huracán 1958
- (Argentina) Chacarita Juniors 1959
- (Chile) Magallanes 1960

== Managerial career ==
Pizarro started his career with Flandria in 1962. He got promotions with Estudiantes de Buenos Aires and Comunicaciones in 1963 and 1969, respectively.

Pizarro won the 1969 Campeonato Metropolitano with Chacarita Juniors.

== Titles ==
=== Player ===
- Argentina 1957 (Copa América Peru 1957)
- Chacarita Juniors 1959 (Primera B Championship)

=== Manager ===
- Chacarita Juniors 1969 (Campeonato Metropolitano)
