= Sarará (footballer) =

Brazilian footballer

Personal information
- Full name: Olavo de Souza Flores
- Date of birth: 4 August 1931
- Place of birth: Porto Alegre, Brazil
- Date of death: 6 August 2013 (aged 82)
- Place of death: Porto Alegre, Brazil
- Height: 1.75 m (5 ft 9 in)
- Position: Midfielder

Youth career
- 1946–1947: GS Força e Luz-RS
- 1947–1948: Cruzeiro-RS
- 1949–1950: Grêmio

Senior career*
Years	Team	Apps	(Gls)
1950–1955	Grêmio	206	(24)
1951	→ Vasco da Gama (loan)		
1956–1958	São Paulo	71	(5)
1957	→ Botafogo-SP (loan)		
1958	Prudentina		
1959–1961	América Mineiro		
1961–1963	Sport Recife		
1963	Bandeirante		
1964	Associação Botucatuense		
1965–1966	Monte Alto AC		
- * Club domestic league appearances and goals as of 28 December 2023

Olavo de Souza Flores (4 August 1931 – 6 August 2013), better known as Sarará, was a Brazilian professional footballer who played as a midfielder.

== Career ==
Born in Porto Alegre, he played for GS Força e Luz, EC Cruzeiro and Grêmio, where he began his professional career. In 1955 he transferred to São Paulo, where he was part of the state champion squad in 1957, under the command of Béla Guttmann. Sarará played in the grand final replacing an injured Dino Sani. He also played for América Mineiro, Sport Recife as well as clubs in the interior of São Paulo. After retiring, he worked as an accountant.

== Honours ==
São Paulo

- Campeonato Paulista: 1957

Sport Recife

- Campeonato Pernambucano: 1962

Bandeirante

- Campeonato Paulista Série A4: 1963
