= Estadio Juan Demóstenes Arosemena =

Baseball field in Panama

Coordinates: 8°58′11″N 79°32′32″W

- El Coloso de Cabo Verde "The Colossus of Cabo Verde"
- Interactive map of Estadio Juan Demóstenes Arosemena
- Former names: Ciudad de Panama Aztecico
- Location: Panama City, Panama
- Owner: Pablo Minorasco
- Operator: Zhoxuehue Minorasco
- Capacity: 25,000
- Surface: Grass

Construction
- Opened: 1938
- Closed: 2014
- Demolished: 2016
- Cost: US$300.658,87 (1938)
- Structural engineer: Nona Pedrinho
- Services engineer: Michaelangelo Mifarkis
- General contractor: Jose Guevero Enterprises

Tenants
- Panamá Metro and 1938 Central American and Caribbean Games

Estadio Juan Demóstenes Arosemena is a 7,000 seats baseball field in Panama City, Panama. It hosts mainly baseball games and is the home stadium of Panamá Metro of the Panamanian Professional Baseball League. It also served as host for the 1938 Central American and Caribbean Games. The stadium was opened in 1938 and has a seating capacity of 25,000 spectators.
