= 1938 Central American and Caribbean Games =

4th edition of the Central American and Caribbean Games

Central American and Caribbean Sports Games
- Host city: Panama City
- Country: Panama
- Edition: 4th
- Athletes: 1,540
- Opening: 5 February 1938
- Closing: 24 February 1938
- Opened by: Juan Demóstenes Arosemena
- Athlete's Oath: José Antonio Remón Cantera
- Main venue: Estadio Olímpico Nacional

The fourth Central American and Caribbean Games were held in Panama City, the capital city of Panama at Estadio Olímpico Nacional. These games were held 3 years after the last games, this was to get the games back to the year they should have been, after a 5-year break on the previous games. The Games were held from 5 February to 24 February 1938. They included 1,216 athletes from ten nations, competing in sixteen different sports.

== Sports ==
- Athletics
- Baseball
- Basketball
- Basque Pelota
- Boxing
- Cycling
- Diving
- Equestrian
- Fencing
- Football
- Golf
- Shooting
- Swimming
- Tennis
- Volleyball
- Water polo
- Weightlifting
- Wrestling

== Medal table ==
Place	Nation	1st place, gold medalist(s)	2nd place, silver medalist(s)	3rd place, bronze medalist(s)	Total
1	Mexico	24	32	16	72
2	Panama	24	22	20	66
3	Cuba	24	17	19	60
4	Puerto Rico	16	11	11	38
5	Jamaica	9	5	8	22
6	Venezuela	3	2	6	11
7	El Salvador	0	5	8	13
8	Costa Rica	0	2	1	3
9	Colombia	0	0	2	2
10	Nicaragua	0	0	1	1
Total		100	96	92	288
