= 1949 NAFC Championship squads =

These are the squads for the countries that played in the 1949 NAFC Championship.

The age listed for each player is on 4 September 1949, the first day of the tournament. The numbers of caps and goals listed for each player do not include any matches played after the start of the tournament. The club listed is the club for which the player last played a competitive match before the tournament. The nationality for each club reflects the national association (not the league) to which the club is affiliated. A flag is included for coaches who are of a different nationality than their own national team.

== Cuba ==
Head coach: Marcelino Minsal

No.	Pos.	Player	Date of birth (age)	Caps	Goals	Club
-	GK	Rolando Aguilar Moreno		0	0	(Football Association of Cuba) Puentes Grandes
-	GK	Pedro Pablo Arozemena		0	0	(Football Association of Cuba) Juventud Asturiana
-	DF	Jacinto Barquín	3 September 1915 (aged 34)	10	2	(Football Association of Cuba) Puentes Grandes
-	DF	Bernardo Llerandi		0	0	(Football Association of Cuba) Puentes Grandes
-	DF	José Minsal		2	0	(Football Association of Cuba) Fortuna
-	DF	José Ovide		2	0	(Football Association of Cuba) Puentes Grandes
-	DF	Ramon Cruz Hernández		0	0	(Football Association of Cuba) Fortuna
-	MF	Miguel Clerch	8 May 1922 (aged 27)	0	0	(Football Association of Cuba) Fortuna
-	MF	Francisco Torrent		0	0	(Football Association of Cuba) Puentes Grandes
-	MF	Marcelino Minsal		0	0	(Football Association of Cuba) Puentes Grandes
-	MF	Armando Granados		0	0	(Football Association of Cuba) Centro Gallego
-	MF	Reinaldo Valdés		0	0	(Football Association of Cuba) Juventud Asturiana
-	MF	Ricardo Torres Suárez		0	0	(Football Association of Cuba) Juventud Asturiana
-	FW	Santiago Viega		0	0	(Football Association of Cuba) Puentes Grandes
-	FW	Valeriano Fano	1949	0	0	(Football Association of Cuba) Fortuna
-	FW	José Darío Gómez		0	0	(Football Association of Cuba) Puentes Grandes
-	FW	Manuel Brioso		1	1	(Football Association of Cuba) Juventud Asturiana
-	FW	Vicente Pérez López		0	0	(Football Association of Cuba) Iberia Havana
-	FW	Orlando Cosculluela		0	0	(Football Association of Cuba) Puentes Grandes

== Mexico ==
Head coach: Rafael Garza Gutiérrez

No.	Pos.	Player	Date of birth (age)	Caps	Goals	Club
-	GK	Raúl Córdoba	13 March 1924 (aged 25)	0	0	(Mexican Football Federation) San Sebastián
-	GK	Melesio Osnaya		0	0	(Mexican Football Federation) Asturias
-	DF	Jorge Romo	20 April 1923 (aged 26)	0	0	(Mexican Football Federation) Asturias
-	DF	Gregorio Gómez	14 February 1927 (aged 22)	0	0	(Mexican Football Federation) Guadalajara
-	DF	Alfonso Montemayor	28 April 1922 (aged 27)	2	0	(Mexican Football Federation) León
-	DF	Felipe Zetter	3 July 1923 (aged 26)	0	0	(Mexican Football Federation) Atlas
-	DF	Carlos Laviada	16 May 1916 (aged 33)	4	0	(Mexican Football Federation) Real España
-	DF	Raúl Valera	29 June 1922 (aged 27)	0	0	(Mexican Football Federation) León
-	MF	Héctor Ortiz	20 December 1928 (aged 20)	0	0	(Mexican Football Federation) Marte
-	MF	Samuel Cuburu	20 February 1928 (aged 21)	0	0	(Mexican Football Federation) Puebla
-	MF	José Antonio Roca	24 May 1928 (aged 21)	0	0	(Mexican Football Federation) Asturias
	MF	Mario Ochoa	7 November 1927 (aged 21)	0	0	(Mexican Football Federation) América
-	FW	Antonio Flores	13 July 1923 (aged 26)	1	0	(Mexican Football Federation) Atlas
-	FW	Francisco Hernández	16 January 1924 (aged 25)	0	0	(Mexican Football Federation) Asturias
-	FW	José Naranjo	19 March 1926 (aged 23)	0	0	(Mexican Football Federation) Oro
-	FW	Luis de la Fuente	17 January 1914 (aged 35)	6	3	(Mexican Football Federation) Veracruz
-	FW	Horacio Casarín	25 May 1918 (aged 31)	6	10	(Mexican Football Federation) Real España
-	MF	Mario Pérez	19 February 1927 (aged 23)	0	0	(Mexican Football Federation) Marte
-	FW	Carlos Septién	18 January 1923 (aged 26)	2	1	(Mexican Football Federation) Real España
	FW	Enrique Sesma	22 April 1927 (aged 22)	0	0	(Mexican Football Federation) Marte
	FW	Luis Luna Barragán	10 January 1928 (aged 21)	0	0	(Mexican Football Federation) León
	FW	Luis Vázquez	1926 (aged 22-23)	0	0	(Mexican Football Federation) Marte

== United States ==
Head coach: Walter Giesler

No.	Pos.	Player	Date of birth (age)	Caps	Goals	Club
-	GK	Frank Borghi	9 April 1925 (aged 24)	0	0	(United States Soccer Federation) St. Louis Simpkins-Ford
-	GK	Joe Silovsky	1916 (aged 32–33)	0	0	(United States Soccer Federation) Chicago Sparta
-	DF	Manuel Martin	29 December 1917 (aged 31)	6	0	(United States Soccer Federation) Ponta Delgada
-	DF	Harry Keough	15 November 1927 (aged 21)	0	0	(United States Soccer Federation) Paul Schulte Motors
-	DF	Gil Bello		0	0	(United States Soccer Federation) Lusitano
-	DF	Ben Wattman		0	0	(United States Soccer Federation) New York Hakoah
-	MF	Bill Sheppell	11 March 1926 (aged 23)	1	0	(United States Soccer Federation) Seton Hall Pirates
-	MF	Charlie Colombo	20 July 1920 (aged 29)	4	0	(United States Soccer Federation) St. Louis Simpkins-Ford
-	MF	Walter Bahr	1 April 1927 (aged 22)	4	0	(United States Soccer Federation) Philadelphia Nationals
-	FW	Benny McLaughlin	10 April 1928 (aged 21)	3	0	(United States Soccer Federation) Philadelphia Nationals
-	FW	John Souza	12 July 1920 (aged 29)	6	0	(United States Soccer Federation) Ponta Delgada
-	FW	Nicholas DiOrio	4 February 1921 (aged 28)	0	0	(United States Soccer Federation) Morgan Strasser
-	FW	Frank Wallace	15 July 1922 (aged 27)	0	0	(United States Soccer Federation) St. Louis Simpkins-Ford
-	FW	Ben John Hynes	12 November 1920 (aged 28)	0	0	(United States Soccer Federation) New York Americans
-	FW	Antone Almeida		0	0	(United States Soccer Federation) Ponta Delgada
-	FW	Pete Matevich	5 May 1920 (aged 29)	1	0	(United States Soccer Federation) Chicago Slovak
