= United States men's national soccer team results (1916–1949) =

This is a compilation of every international soccer game played by the United States men's national soccer team from 1916 through 1949. It includes the team's record for that year, each game and the date played. It also lists the U.S. goal scorers.

The format is: home team listed first, U.S. listed first at home or neutral site.

Records are in win–loss–tie format. Games decided in penalty kicks are counted as ties, as per the FIFA standard.

== 1916 ==
Wins	Losses	Draws
1	0	1

Win Draw Loss

August 20 Friendly	Sweden	2–3	United States	Stockholm, Sweden
	Törnqvist 7', 81'		Spalding 22'; Ellis 53'; Cooper 68'	Stadium: Stockholms Olympiastadion; Attendance: 16,000

September 3 Friendly	Norway	1–1	United States	Kristiania, Norway
	Engebretsen		Ellis	Stadium: Frogner stadion Attendance: 25,000

== 1917-1923 ==
Wins	Losses	Draws
0	0	0

== 1924 ==
Wins	Losses	Draws
2	2	0

Win Draw Loss

May 25 Olympics R32	United States	1–0	Estonia	Paris, France
	Straden 15' (pen.)			Stadium: Stade Pershing; Attendance: 8,110

May 29 Olympics R16	United States	0–3	Uruguay	Paris, France
			Petrone 10', 44'; Scarone 15'	Stadium: Stade Bergeyre; Attendance: 10,455

June 10 Friendly	Poland	2–3	United States	Warsaw, Poland
	Czulak 6'; Chruscinski 32'		Wells 3'; Straden 30', 47'	Stadium: Agrykola Stadium; Attendance: 8,000

June 16 Friendly	Irish Free State	3–1	United States	Dublin, Ireland
	Brooks		Rhody	Stadium: Dalymount Park

== 1925 ==
Wins	Losses	Draws
1	1	0

Win Draw Loss

June 27 Friendly	Canada	1–0	United States	Montreal, Canada
	McLaine			Stadium: Alexandria Park; Attendance: 3,500

November 8 Friendly	United States	6–1	Canada	New York, New York
	Brown; Stark		Burness	Stadium: Ebbets Field; Attendance: 8,000

== 1926 ==
Wins	Losses	Draws
1	0	0

Win Draw Loss

November 6 Friendly	United States	6–2	Canada	New York, New York
	D. Brown; Auld; Florie; Marshall		Faulkner; Graham	Stadium: Ebbets Field; Attendance: 2,500

== 1927 ==
Wins	Losses	Draws
0	0	0

== 1928 ==
Wins	Losses	Draws
0	1	1

Win Draw Loss

May 29 Olympics R16	United States	2–11	Argentina	Amsterdam, Netherlands
	Kuntner 55'; O'Carroll 75'		Ferreira 9', 29'; Tarasconi 24', 63', 66', 89'; Orsi 41', 73'; Cherro 47', 49', 57'	Stadium: Olympic Stadium; Attendance: 3,848

June 10 Friendly	Poland	3–3	United States	Warsaw, Poland
	Kucher 12', 78'; Steuermann 89' (pen.)		Ryan 59' (pen.); Gallagher 64'; Kuntner 74'	Stadium: Agrykola Stadium; Attendance: 10,000

== 1929 ==
Wins	Losses	Draws
0	0	0

== 1930 ==
Wins	Losses	Draws
2	2	0

Win Draw Loss

July 13 World Cup GS	United States	3–0	Belgium	Montevideo, Uruguay
	McGhee 23'; Florie 45'; Patenaude 69'			Stadium: Estadio Gran Parque Central; Attendance: 18,346

July 17 World Cup GS	United States	3–0	Paraguay	Montevideo, Uruguay
	Patenaude 10', 15', 50'			Stadium: Estadio Gran Parque Central; Attendance: 18,306

July 26 World Cup SF	United States	1–6	Argentina	Montevideo, Uruguay
	Brown 89'		Monti 20'; Scopelli 56'; Stábile 69', 87'; Peucelle 80', 85'	Stadium: Estadio Centenario; Attendance: 72,886

August 17 Friendly	Brazil	4–3	United States	Rio de Janeiro, Brazil
	Doca; Leite; Preguinho; Teóphilo		Patenaude; Gonsalves	Stadium: Estádio das Laranjeiras

== 1931-1933 ==
Wins	Losses	Draws
0	0	0

== 1934 ==
Wins	Losses	Draws
1	1	0

Win Draw Loss

May 24 WCQ	United States	4–2	Mexico	Rome, Italy
	Donelli 28', 32', 74', 87'		Alonso 25'; Mejía 75'	Stadium: Stadio Nazionale PNF; Attendance: 12,000

May 27 World Cup R1	Italy	7–1	United States	Rome, Italy
	Schiavio 18', 29', 64'; Orsi 20', 69'; Ferrari 63'; Meazza 90'		Donelli 57'	Stadium: Stadio Nazionale PNF; Attendance: 25,000

== 1935 ==
Wins	Losses	Draws
0	2	0

May 19 Friendly (Note: Regarded as a full international by the United States Soccer Federation but not by the Scottish Football Association.)	United States (Note: Playing as Eastern USA All-Stars.)	1–5	Scotland	New York, New York
	McEwan	Report 1 Report 2	Mills; Duncan; Meiklejohn	Stadium: Polo Grounds; Attendance: 22,970

June 9 Friendly	United States	1–4	Scotland	Newark, New Jersey
	Moorhouse	Report 1 Report 2	Gallacher; Mills; Duncan; Meiklejohn	Stadium: Newark Schools Stadium; Attendance: 8,436

== 1936 ==
Wins	Losses	Draws
0	0	0

Win Draw Loss

== 1937 ==
Wins	Losses	Draws
0	3	0

Win Draw Loss

September 12 Friendly	Mexico	7–2	United States	Mexico City, Mexico
	Casarín 13', 74'; Arguelles 64', 76', 83'; Murgenson 79'; Herranz 89'		Rae 10'; McEwan 75'	Stadium: Parque Asturias; Attendance: 21,000

September 19 Friendly	Mexico	7–3	United States	Mexico City, Mexico
	Casarín 36', 50'; Alonso 38', 54', 66'; Cortina 63'; Arguelles 74'		Nemchik 60', 87'; Laviada 89' (o.g.)	Stadium: Parque Necaxa; Attendance: 22,000

September 26 Friendly	Mexico	5–1	United States	Mexico City, Mexico
	Garcia 15', 35'; Ruiz 63', 65'; Arguelles 75'		Rae 9'	Stadium: Parque España

== 1938-1946 ==
Wins	Losses	Draws
0	0	0

== 1947 ==
Wins	Losses	Draws
0	2	0

Win Draw Loss

July 13 NAFC Championship	United States	0–5	Mexico	Havana, Cuba
			López 3', 35', 85'; Segura 53'; Ruiz 78' (pen.)	Stadium: Gran Stadium Cervecería Tropical

July 20 NAFC Championship	Cuba	5–2	United States	Havana, Cuba
			Souza; Valentine	Stadium: Gran Stadium Cervecería Tropical

== 1948 ==
Wins	Losses	Draws
0	2	0

Win Draw Loss

August 6 Friendly	Norway	11–0	United States	Oslo, Norway
	Thoresen; Sørensen; Sordahl; Dahlen			Stadium: Ullevaal Stadion; Attendance: 25,000

September 26 Friendly	Northern Ireland	5–0	United States	Belfast, Northern Ireland
				Stadium: Windsor Park

== 1949 ==
Wins	Losses	Draws
1	3	1

Win Draw Loss

June 19 Friendly (Note: Regarded as a full international by the United States Soccer Federation but not by the Scottish Football Association.)	United States	0–4	Scotland	New York, New York
		Report 1 Report 2	Waddell; Steel	Stadium: Triborough Stadium; Attendance: 17,000

September 4 NAFC Championship	Mexico	6–0	United States	Mexico City, Mexico
	Flores 20'; Luna 30' de la Fuente 37', 55', 58'; Septién 85'			Stadium: Estadio Olímpico de los Deportes; Attendance: 60,000

September 14 NAFC Championship	United States	1–1	Cuba	Mexico City, Mexico
	Wallace 23'		Gómez 28'	Stadium: Estadio Olímpico de los Deportes; Attendance: 8,000

September 18 NAFC Championship	Mexico	6–2	United States	Mexico City, Mexico
	Ortíz 14'; Casarín 23', 41', 76' de la Fuente 47'; Ochoa 89'		Souza 52'; Wattman 90'	Stadium: Estadio Olímpico de los Deportes; Attendance: 54,500

September 21 NAFC Championship	United States	5–2	Cuba	Mexico City, Mexico
	Bahr 16'; Souza 23'; Matevich 30', 35'; Wallace 48'		Barquín 42' (pen.); Veiga 50'	Stadium: Estadio Olímpico de los Deportes; Attendance: 5,000

== See also ==
- United States at the FIFA World Cup
