= 1949 NAFC Championship =

Tournament details
- Host country: Mexico
- Dates: 4–25 September
- Teams: 3
- Venue(s): Estadio de los Deportes, Mexico City

Final positions
- Champions: Mexico (2nd title)
- Runners-up: United States
- Third place: Cuba

Tournament statistics
- Matches played: 6
- Goals scored: 28 (4.67 per match)
- Attendance: 198,000 (33,000 per match)
- Top scorer(s): (Mexico) Horacio Casarín (Mexico) Luis de la Fuente (4 goals each)

The 1949 NAFC Championship was the second and final international association football championship for members of the North American Football Confederation (NAFC). Hosted by Mexico, the competition ran from 4–25 September 1949 and was contested by the national teams of Cuba, Mexico and the United States. For the only time, the tournament was used one of the qualifying groups for the FIFA World Cup.

Defending champions Mexico were crowned champions after a 6–2 win over the United States on 18 September gave them an unassailable lead with two matches left to play. Winners Mexico and runners-up the United States both qualified for the 1950 FIFA World Cup in Brazil.

== Background ==
The North American Football Confederation (NAFC) was founded in 1946. Along with the Confederación Centroamericana y del Caribe de Fútbol (CCCF), it was a precursor organisation to the Confederation of North, Central America and Caribbean Association Football (CONCACAF). Within a year of its founding, the NAFC organised a contest for its member associations.

Mexico were the defending champions having won the inaugural competition in Cuba in 1947.

== Format ==
The tournament was played as a double round-robin where each team would play all of the others twice. The winner would be decided by the total number of points obtained across all matches played. As the competition was used as one of the qualifying groups for the 1950 FIFA World Cup in Brazil, the teams finishing first and second would qualify for the tournament.

=== Participants ===
- Cuba
- Mexico (Hosts)
- United States

== Venue ==
All matches were held at the Estadio de los Deportes in Mexico City.

Mexico City
Estadio de los Deportes
Capacity: 33,000
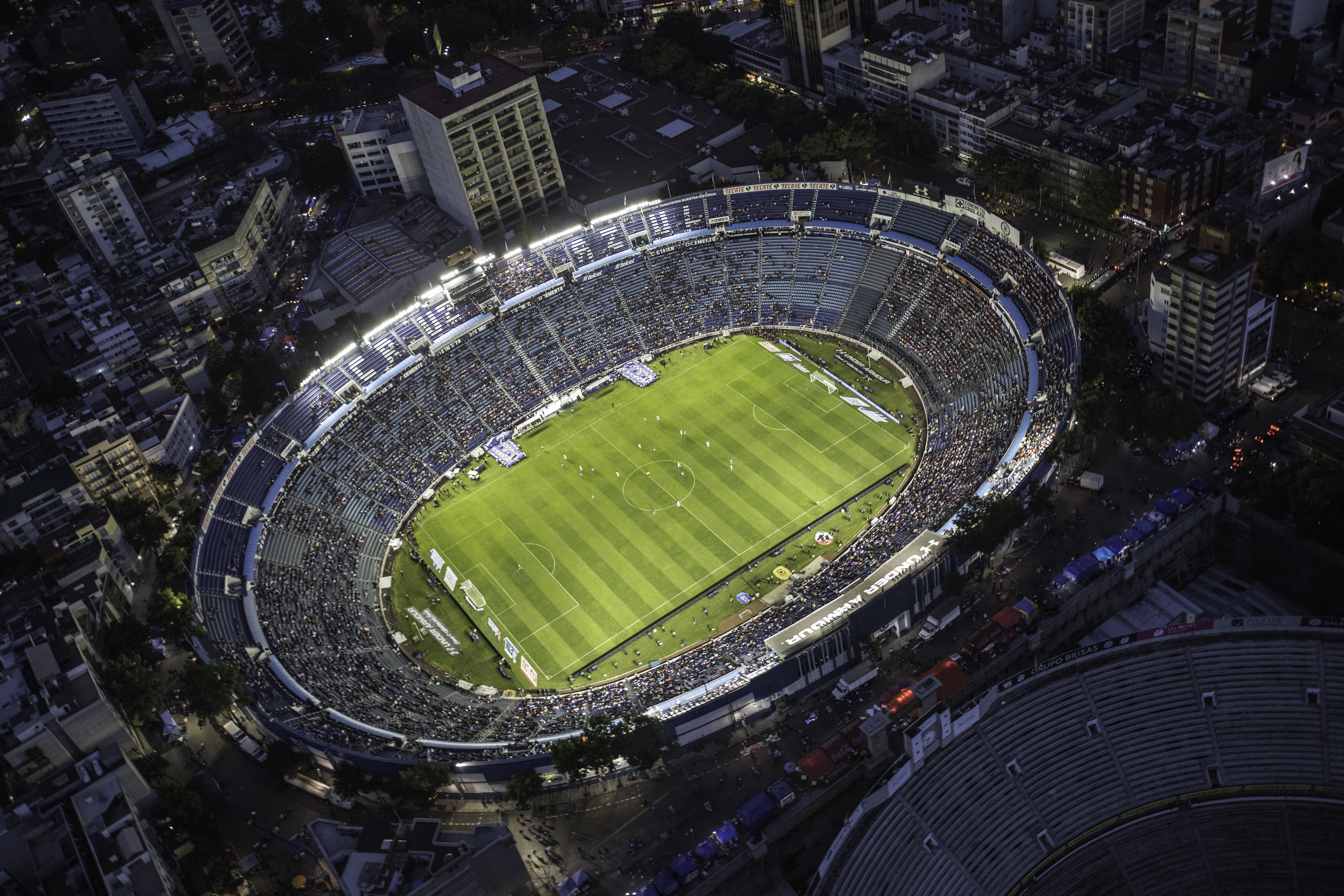

== Summary ==
The tournament began on 4 September 1949 when a Luis de la Fuente hat-trick helped Mexico to a 6–0 win against the United States. A week later, Mexico defeated Cuba 2–0 for their second win of the contest. Despite not playing, Mexico qualified for the 1950 FIFA World Cup on 14 September after Cuba and the United States played out a 1–1 draw. The result left Mexico clear at the top on four points with Cuba and the United States tied on one point at the half way stage.

Four days later, Mexico sealed the title after a Horacio Casarín hat-trick helped them to a 6–2 win against the United States. In their final match of the tournament, a Pete Matevich brace helped the United States to a 5–2 win against Cuba and put them in a position to qualify for the World Cup. Their place at the tournament was confirmed when Cuba failed to score against Mexico and lost 3–0 in their final match.

== Table ==
Pos	Team	Pld	W	D	L	GF	GA	GD	Pts	Qualification
1	Mexico (C)	4	4	0	0	17	2	+15	8	1950 FIFA World Cup
2	United States	4	1	1	2	8	15	−7	3	1950 FIFA World Cup
3	Cuba	4	0	1	3	3	11	−8	1	

(C) Champions

== Results ==
4 September 1949

United States	0–6	Mexico
		Flores 20'; Luna 30'; De la Fuente 37', 55', 58'; Septién 85'

Estadío de los Deportes, Mexico City
Attendance: 60,000
Referee: José Tapia (Cuba)

11 September 1949

Mexico	2–0	Cuba
Luna 26'; Casarín 57'

Estadío de los Deportes, Mexico City
Attendance: 60,000
Referee: Prudencio García (United States)

14 September 1949

Cuba	1–1	United States
Gómez 28'		Wallace 23'

Estadío de los Deportes, Mexico City
Attendance: 8,000

18 September 1949

Mexico	6–2	United States
Ortíz 14'; Casarín 23', 41', 76'; de la Fuente 47'; Ochoa 89'		Souza 52'; Wattman 90'

Estadío de los Deportes, Mexico City
Attendance: 30,000
Referee: José Tapia (Cuba)

21 September 1949

United States	5–2	Cuba
Bahr 16'; Souza 23'; Matevich 30', 35'; Wallace 48'		Barquín 42'; Veiga 50'

Estadío de los Deportes, Mexico City
Attendance: 5,000
Referee: Nieto Lara (Mexico)

25 September 1949

Mexico	3–0	Cuba
Naranjo 44'; Flores 58'; Naranjo 88'

Estadío de los Deportes, Mexico City
Attendance: 35,000
Referee: Prudencio García (United States)

== Goalscorers ==
There were 28 goals scored in 6 matches, for an average of 4.67 goals per match.

4 goals

- (Mexico) Horacio Casarín
- (Mexico) Luis de la Fuente

2 goals

- (Mexico) Antonio Flores
- (Mexico) Luis Luna
- (Mexico) José Naranjo
- (United States) Pete Matevich
- (United States) John Souza
- (United States) Frank Wallace

1 goal

- (Cuba) Jacinto Barquín
- (Cuba) José Gómez
- (Cuba) Santiago Veiga
- (Mexico) Mario Ochoa
- (Mexico) Héctor Ortíz
- (Mexico) Carlos Septién
- (United States) Walter Bahr
- (United States) Ben Wattman

== Aftermath ==
Both Mexico and the United States were eliminated from the 1950 FIFA World Cup at the group stage, however the United States would cause one of the most famous upsets in the history of the World Cup, defeating England 1–0.

This would be the final edition of the competition as organised by the NAFC. However, it would be revived through the North American Nations Cup organised by CONCACAF in the early 1990s.
