= Samuel Cuburu =

Mexican footballer (born 1928)

Personal information
- Full name: Samuel Abdul Cuburu Cano
- Date of birth: 20 February 1928
- Place of birth: Orizaba, Veracruz, Mexico
- Height: 1.95 m (6 ft 5 in)
- Position: Midfielder

Senior career*
Years	Team	Apps	(Gls)
1947–1951	Puebla		
1953–1956	Zacatepec		

International career
1949–1956	Mexico	4	(0)
- * Club domestic league appearances and goals

Samuel Abdul Cuburu Cano (born 20 February 1928) was a Mexican professional footballer. He was born in Orizaba, Veracruz. He played in the Mexican first division as well as in the 1950 FIFA World Cup in Brazil.

== Club career ==
Cuburu, nicknamed "Chapela", played club football with Puebla in the 1950s. His brother, José Antonio "El Perro" Cuburu, also played with Puebla. He appeared for Zacatepec in the 1954–55 Campeón de Campeones.

== International career ==
Cuburu made four appearances for the Mexico national football team from 1949 to 1956.
