= Francisco Hernández (Mexican footballer) =

Mexican footballer (1924–2011)

Personal information
- Full name: Francisco Hernandez Pineda
- Date of birth: 16 January 1924
- Place of birth: Toluca, Mexico
- Date of death: 24 January 2011 (aged 87)
- Place of death: Mexico City, Mexico
- Position: Midfielder

Senior career*
Years	Team	Apps	(Gls)
- Atlético Zacatepec

International career
1949–1953	Mexico	4	(0)
- * Club domestic league appearances and goals

Francisco Hernández Pineda (16 January 1924 – 24 January 2011) was a Mexican football midfielder.

== Career ==
Hernández played for Mexico national team in the 1950 FIFA World Cup. He also played for Zacatepec and was a longtime executive and coach at Club América.
