= North American Football Confederation =

International sports organization

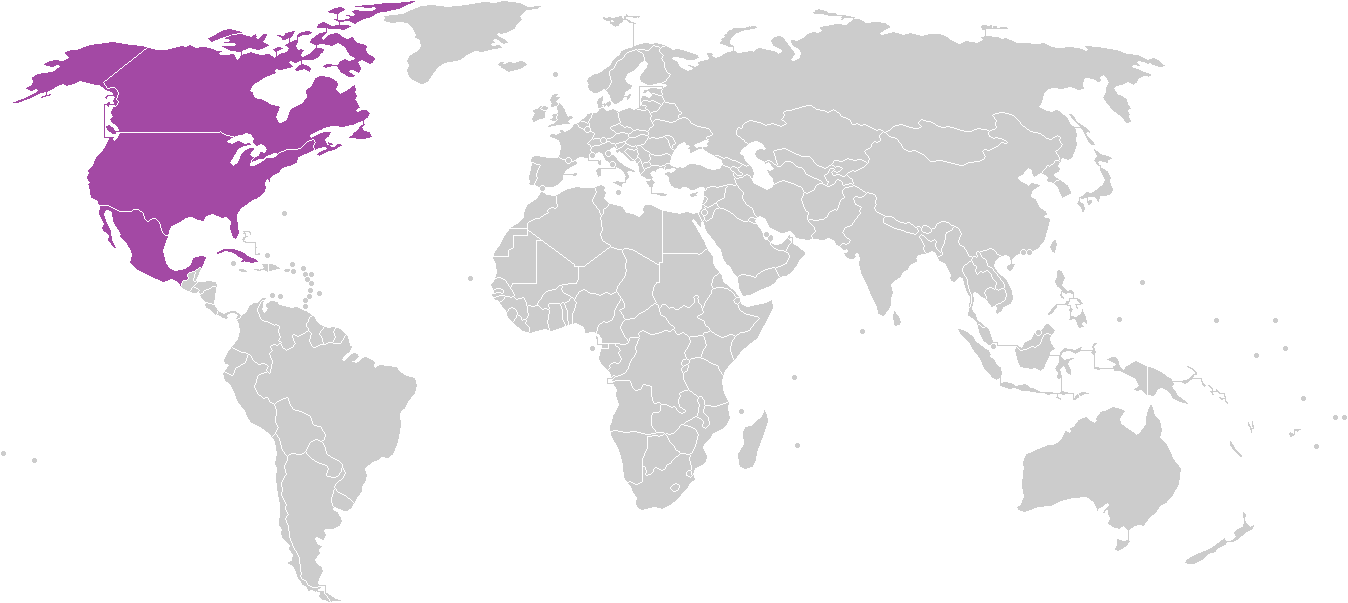
- Abbreviation: NAFC
- Successor: CONCACAF
- Formation: 1946; 80 years ago
- Founded at: Havana, Cuba
- Dissolved: 1961; 65 years ago
- Type: Association football governing body
- Region served: North America; Cuba (1946–1955)
- Members: 4 associations
- Official language: English; Spanish; French
- Affiliations: FIFA

The North American Football Confederation (Spanish: Confederación Norteamericana de Fútbol, French: Confédération nord-américaine de football), abbreviated as NAFC, was the regional governing body of association football in North America from 1946 to 1961, and a predecessor confederation of CONCACAF. Founded in 1946 in Havana, under the first elected president Carlos Alonso. NAFC and CCCF merged to form CONCACAF in 1961.

== Member associations ==
- Canada
- Cuba (transferred to CCCF in 1955)
- Mexico
- United States

== NAFC Championship ==
The NAFC Championship was an official association football competition organized by NAFC as the premier regional tournament for men's senior national teams from North America and Cuba.

Two editons of the competition were held, with Mexico winning both.

Results
Year	Hosts	Champions	Results	Runners-up	Third place
1947	Cuba	Mexico	Round-robin	Cuba	United States
1949	Mexico	Mexico	Round-robin	United States	Cuba

Performances
Team	Champions	Runners-up	Third place	Total
Mexico	2 (1947, 1949)	—	—	2
Cuba	—	1 (1947)	1 (1949)	2
United States	—	1 (1949)	1 (1947)	2

Notes

- Italic — Hosts

== See also ==
- CCCF
- CONCACAF
- NAFU
- UNCAF
- CFU
