= Mario Pérez (footballer, born 1927) =

Mexican footballer (born 1927)

Personal information
- Full name: Mario Pérez Plascencia
- Date of birth: 19 February 1927
- Place of birth: Mexico
- Date of death: c. 1985
- Position: Midfielder

Senior career*
| Years | Team | Apps | (Gls) |
- Club Deportivo Marte

International career
| 1949–1950 | Mexico | 4 | (0) |
- * Club domestic league appearances and goals

Mario Pérez Plascencia (19 February 1927 – c. 1985) was a Mexican football midfielder who played for Mexico in the 1950 FIFA World Cup. He also played for Club Deportivo Marte.

Pérez died during the 1985/1986 season.
