= Ben Wattman =

American soccer player

Personal information
- Full name: Benjamin Wattman

Senior career*
Years	Team	Apps	(Gls)
- New York Hakoah

International career
1949	United States	2	(1)
- * Club domestic league appearances and goals

Benjamin "Ben" Wattman is an American former soccer player who earned two caps, scoring one goal, with the U.S. national team in 1949. Wattman earned his first caps in a 6–0 loss to Mexico on September 4, 1949. Fourteen days later, he earned his second cap and scored a goal in a 6–2 loss to Mexico. Both of these games were part of the 1949 NAFC Championship which was used as the regional qualification tournament for the 1950 FIFA World Cup. Despite the two losses to Mexico, the U.S. qualified for the World Cup with a tie and win over Cuba. Wattman was not selected for the World Cup roster. At the time, he played for New York Hakoah in the American Soccer League.
