= Carlos Septién =

Mexican footballer (1923–1978)

Personal information
- Full name: Carlos Septién González
- Date of birth: 18 January 1923
- Place of birth: Mexico
- Date of death: 1978 (aged 54–55)
- Position: Forward

Senior career*
Years	Team	Apps	(Gls)
1942–1950	España		
1950–1951	Atlante		
1951–1954	Tampico		

International career
1947–1954	Mexico	13	(6)
- * Club domestic league appearances and goals

Carlos Septién González (18 January 1923 – 1978) was a Mexican football forward who played for Mexico in the 1950 and 1954 FIFA World Cups. He also played for Real Club España and Jaibos Tampico Madero.

Septién played for Mexico at the 1947 North American Football Championship.

His son is former Dallas Cowboys kicker Rafael Septién. In a 1987 article about Rafael, Carlos was mentioned as being deceased, although his exact death date is unknown.

== International career ==
=== International goals ===
Scores and results list Mexico's goal tally first.

No	Date	Venue	Opponent	Score	Result	Competition
1.	17 July 1947	Estadio La Tropical, Havana, Cuba	Cuba	2–1	3–1	1947 NAFC Championship
2.	4 September 1949	Estadio de los Deportes, Mexico City, Mexico	United States	6–0	6–0	1949 NAFC Championship
3.	23 March 1952	Estadio Nacional, Santiago, Chile	Uruguay	1–1	1–3	1952 Panamerican Championship
4.	10 April 1952	Estadio Nacional, Santiago, Chile	Panama	1–0	4–2	1952 Panamerican Championship
5.	10 April 1952	Estadio Nacional, Santiago, Chile	Panama	3–0	4–2	1952 Panamerican Championship
6.	10 April 1952	Estadio Nacional, Santiago, Chile	Panama	4–2	4–2	1952 Panamerican Championship
