= Antonio Flores (footballer, born 1923) =

Mexican footballer

Personal information
- Full name: Antonio Flores Rodríguez
- Date of birth: 13 July 1923
- Place of birth: Guadalajara, Jalisco, Mexico
- Date of death: May 16, 2001 (aged 77)
- Position: Midfielder

Senior career*
Years	Team	Apps	(Gls)
- Atlas
- Oro

International career
1947–1950	Mexico	7	(2)
- * Club domestic league appearances and goals

Antonio Flores Rodríguez, nicknamed El Niño (13 July 1923 — 16 May 2001) was a Mexican football midfielder who played for Mexico in the 1950 FIFA World Cup.

== Club career ==
He also played for Club Atlas.
