= Mario Ochoa (footballer) =

Mexican footballer (born 1927)

Personal information
- Full name: Mario Ochoa Gil
- Date of birth: 7 November 1927
- Place of birth: Mexico
- Position: Midfielder

Senior career*
| Years | Team | Apps | (Gls) |
- Club América
- Club Deportivo Marte

International career
| 1949–1950 | Mexico | 5 | (1) |
- * Club domestic league appearances and goals

Mario Ochoa Gil (born 7 November 1927, date of death unknown) was a Mexican football midfielder who played for Mexico in the 1950 and 1954 FIFA World Cups. He also played for Club América and Club Deportivo Marte.

Ochoa is deceased.
