= Héctor Ortiz (footballer) =

Mexican footballer (born 1928)

Personal information
- Full name: Héctor Ortiz Benítez
- Date of birth: 20 December 1928
- Place of birth: Mexico
- Date of death: 30 November 1995
- Position: Midfielder

Senior career*
Years	Team	Apps	(Gls)
- Club Deportivo Marte

International career
1949–1957	Mexico	9	(2)
- * Club domestic league appearances and goals

Héctor Ortiz Benítez (born 20 December 1928, death 30 November 1995) was a Mexican professional footballer who played as a midfielder.

== Career ==
Ortiz had a role in the development of Pumas UNAM. He played for Mexico national team in the 1950 FIFA World Cup. He also played for Club Deportivo Marte. He scored Mexico's only goal in the 4–1 loss against Yugoslavia in the 1950 FIFA World Cup.

Ortiz is deceased.
