= Pete Matevich =

American soccer player

Pete Matevich (May 5, 1920 – September 13, 1980) was an American soccer player who earned four caps, scoring two goals, as a member of the U.S. national team in 1949.

== Professional career ==
Matevich was a member of the Chicago Maroons of the North American Soccer Football League. In 1946, he was the league's second leading scorer behind Gil Heron with seven goals. After the league folded in the fall of 1947, he moved to Chicago Slovak of the National Soccer League of Chicago.

== National team ==
Matevich played earned his first cap with the U.S. national team in a June 19, 1949 loss to Scotland. He went on to play three qualifying games for the 1950 FIFA World Cup. He scored two goals in the last U.S. game, a 5–2 victory over Cuba. Despite that contribution, he was not selected for the World Cup roster.

== International goals ==
No.	Date	Venue	Opponent	Score	Result	Competition
1.	21 September 1949	Mexico City, Mexico	Cuba	3–0	5–2	1950 FIFA World Cup qualification
2.	21 September 1949	Mexico City, Mexico	Cuba	4–0	5–2	1950 FIFA World Cup qualification
