= Mexico national football team =

Men's association football team

Mexico
- Nickname(s): El Tri; El Tricolor
- Association: Federación Mexicana de Fútbol (FMF)
- Confederation: CONCACAF (North America)
- Sub-confederation: NAFU (North America)
- Head coach: Rafael Márquez
- Captain: César Montes
- Most caps: Andrés Guardado (180)
- Top scorer: Javier Hernández (52)
- Home stadium: Estadio Azteca
- FIFA code: MEX
| First colours | Second colours | Third colours |

FIFA ranking
- Current: 13 ▼3 (18 November 2026)
- Highest: 4 (February–June 1998, August 2003, April 2004, June 2004, May–June 2006)
- Lowest: 40 (July 2015)

First international
- Mexico 2–1 Guatemala (Mexico City, Mexico; 9 December 1923)

Biggest win
- Mexico 13–0 Bahamas (Toluca, Mexico; 28 April 1987)

Biggest defeat
- England 8–0 Mexico (London, England; 10 May 1961)

World Cup
- Appearances: 18 (first in 1930)
- Best result: Quarter-finals (1970, 1986)

CONCACAF Championship / Gold Cup
- Appearances: 26 (first in 1963)
- Best result: Champions (1965, 1971, 1977, 1993, 1996, 1998, 2003, 2009, 2011, 2015, 2019, 2023, 2025)

CONCACAF Nations League
- Appearances: 4 (first in 2019–20)
- Best result: Champions (2025)

CONCACAF Cup
- Appearances: 1 (first in 2015)
- Best result: Champions (2015)

Copa América
- Appearances: 11 (first in 1993)
- Best result: Runners-up (1993, 2001)

Confederations Cup
- Appearances: 7 (first in 1995)
- Best result: Champions (1999)
Medal record
FIFA Confederations Cup
| Gold medal – first place | 1999 Mexico | Team |
| Bronze medal – third place | 1995 Saudi Arabia | Team |
CONCACAF Championship / Gold Cup
| Gold medal – first place | 1965 Guatemala | Team |
| Gold medal – first place | 1971 Trinidad and Tobago | Team |
| Gold medal – first place | 1977 Mexico | Team |
| Gold medal – first place | 1993 Mexico and United States | Team |
| Gold medal – first place | 1996 United States | Team |
| Gold medal – first place | 1998 United States | Team |
| Gold medal – first place | 2003 Mexico and United States | Team |
| Gold medal – first place | 2009 United States | Team |
| Gold medal – first place | 2011 United States | Team |
| Gold medal – first place | 2015 Canada and United States | Team |
| Gold medal – first place | 2019 Costa Rica, Jamaica and United States | Team |
| Gold medal – first place | 2023 Canada and United States | Team |
| Gold medal – first place | 2025 Canada and United States | Team |
| Silver medal – second place | 1967 Honduras | Team |
| Silver medal – second place | 2007 United States | Team |
| Silver medal – second place | 2021 United States | Team |
| Bronze medal – third place | 1973 Haiti | Team |
| Bronze medal – third place | 1981 Honduras | Team |
| Bronze medal – third place | 1991 United States | Team |
CONCACAF Nations League
| Gold medal – first place | 2025 United States | Team |
| Silver medal – second place | 2020 United States | Team |
| Silver medal – second place | 2024 United States | Team |
| Bronze medal – third place | 2023 United States | Team |
CONCACAF Cup
| Gold medal – first place | 2015 United States | Team |
Copa América
| Silver medal – second place | 1993 Ecuador | Team |
| Silver medal – second place | 2001 Colombia | Team |
| Bronze medal – third place | 1997 Bolivia | Team |
| Bronze medal – third place | 1999 Paraguay | Team |
| Bronze medal – third place | 2007 Venezuela | Team |
Panamerican Championship
| Bronze medal – third place | 1960 Costa Rica | Team |
NAFC Championship
| Gold medal – first place | 1947 Cuba | Team |
| Gold medal – first place | 1949 Mexico | Team |
North American Nations Cup
| Gold medal – first place | 1991 United States | Team |
| Silver medal – second place | 1990 Canada | Team |
Central American and Caribbean Games
| Gold medal – first place | 1935 El Salvador | Team |
| Gold medal – first place | 1938 Panama | Team |
- Website: miseleccion.mx

The Mexico national football team (Note: Spanish: Selección Mexicana de Fútbol) represents Mexico in men's international football, and is governed by the Mexican Football Federation (Spanish: Federación Mexicana de Fútbol), the governing body for football in Mexico founded in 1927. It has been a full member of FIFA since 1929, is a founding member of CONCACAF which was founded in 1961, and is also a member of NAFU in the North American Zone. From 1946 to 1961, the team was a member of NAFC, the former governing body of football in North America and a predecessor confederation of CONCACAF. Mexico was also a member of PFC, the former unified confederation of the Americas.

Mexico has qualified for the FIFA World Cup eighteen times and has qualified consecutively since 1994, making it one of six countries to do so. It is one of five CONCACAF teams to have advanced to the knockout stage, reaching the quarter-finals twice (1970 and 1986) both as hosts, and also reaching the round of 16 in 8 editions, 7 of them consecutively between 1994 and 2018. Mexico played the first match in World Cup history facing France in Uruguay 1930. The team qualified for the FIFA Confederations Cup seven times, being the only CONCACAF team and the only non-European or South American team to have won a global/intercontinental competition directly organized by FIFA, winning the 1999 FIFA Confederations Cup as hosts, defeating Brazil 4–3.

Mexico has participated twenty-six times in CONCACAF's premier continental competition, and is the most successful team in its confederation, winning 15 CONCACAF continental titles (10 CONCACAF Gold Cup titles, 3 CONCACAF Championship titles, one CONCACAF Nations League and one CONCACAF Cup). It has participated eleven times in the Copa América, finishing as runners-up twice (1993 and 2001) and finishing as third place three times. The team also participated three times in the Panamerican Championship, finishing as third place in 1960.

In subcontinental competitions, the team won two NAFC Championship titles, one North American Nations Cup, and two gold medals at the Central American and Caribbean Games. Mexico is one of eight nations (Note: Along with Germany, Brazil, Italy, Argentina, France, Spain, and Uruguay.) to have won two of the three most important football competitions organized/recognized by FIFA (World Cup, Confederations Cup, and Olympic football tournament), winning the 1999 Confederations Cup with the senior team and the 2012 Olympic football tournament with the Under-23 team.

== History ==
=== Early years ===
Football in Mexico was first organized in the early 20th century by European immigrant groups, notably miners from Cornwall, England, and in later years Spanish exiles fleeing the Spanish Civil War.

The team's first match was played on 9 December 1923 at Parque España in Mexico City, beating Guatemala 2–1, which was the first match of a series of international friendlies played against Guatemala. The second match played on 12 December was won by Mexico 2–0, and the final match of the series, played on 16 December, ended in a 3–3 draw. The manager for this team was Rafael Garza Gutiérrez.

It would be another four years before the national team would be represented in international friendlies. Mexico faced Spain, drawing 3–3 on 19 June 1927. During this series, the team also played against Nacional de Montevideo, losing 1–3.

=== Formation ===
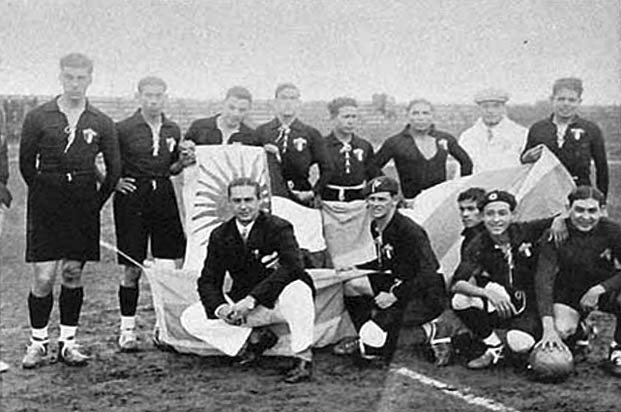
The Mexico national team before the first ever World Cup game against France in 1930

In 1927, the first official governing football body in Mexico was founded. The 1928 Olympic Football Tournament was Mexico's first official international competition, where Mexico lost to Spain 1–7 in the round of 16.

Mexico participated in the inaugural 1930 FIFA World Cup in Uruguay, grouped with Argentina, Chile, and France. Mexico took part in the first World Cup match ever, a 4–1 loss to France, with Mexico's first World Cup goal scored by Juan Carreño. In their second match, Mexico fell to Chile 3–0. Mexico's third match, against Argentina, featured the first penalty of the tournament, scored by Mexico's Manuel Rosas, although Mexico would go on to lose this match by a score of 6–3.

=== Post-WWII ===
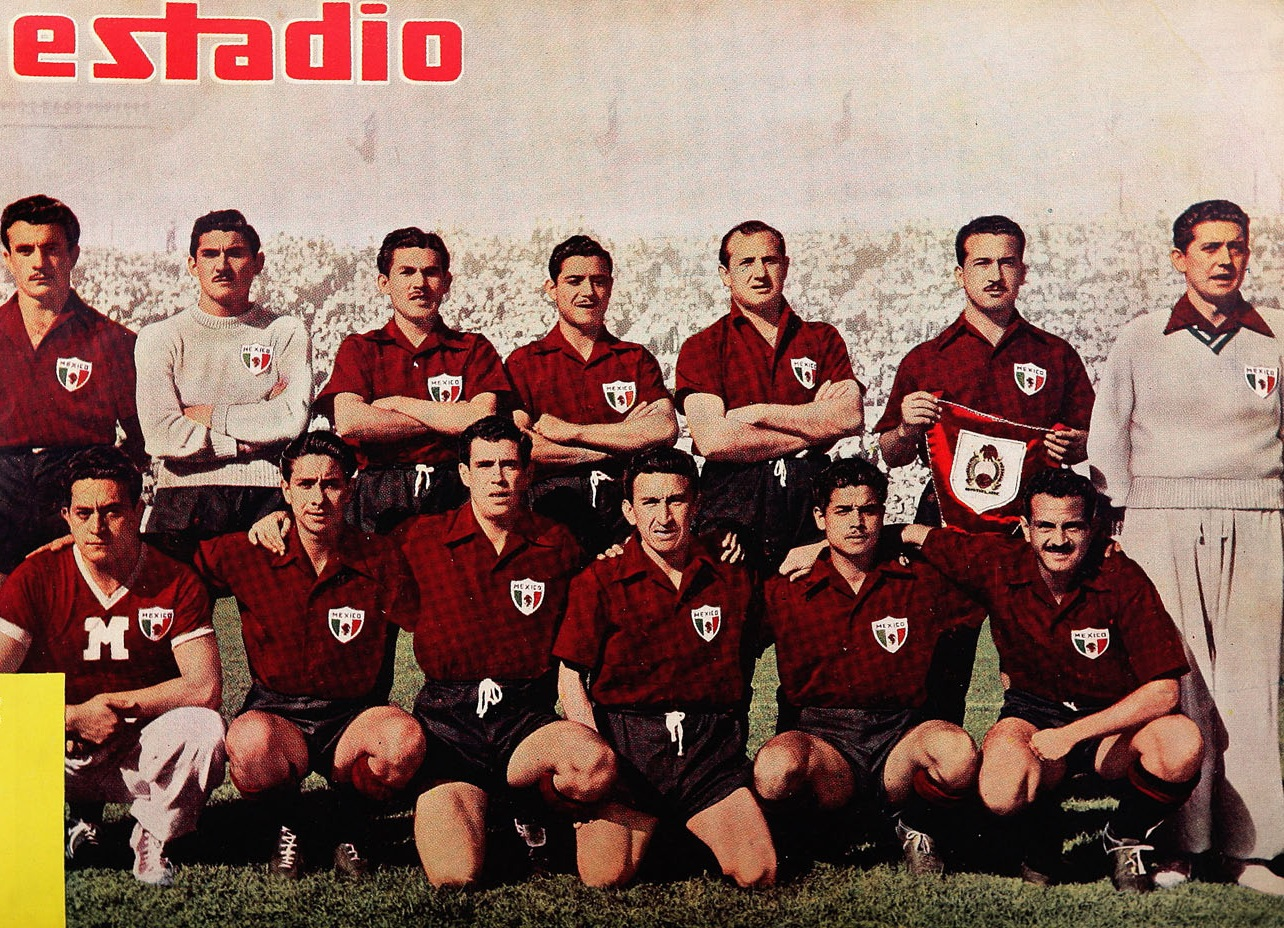
Mexican squad in April 1952

Mexico did not appear in another World Cup tournament until 1950. Despite being the strongest team in the North American Football Confederation and its successor, CONCACAF, Mexico struggled to make much of an impact in the World Cup before 1970, and found it difficult to compete against European and South American teams. However, goalkeeper Antonio Carbajal has the distinction of being the first player ever to appear in five consecutive World Cups.

In 1965, Mexico won the 1965 CONCACAF Championship to become continental champions for the first time.

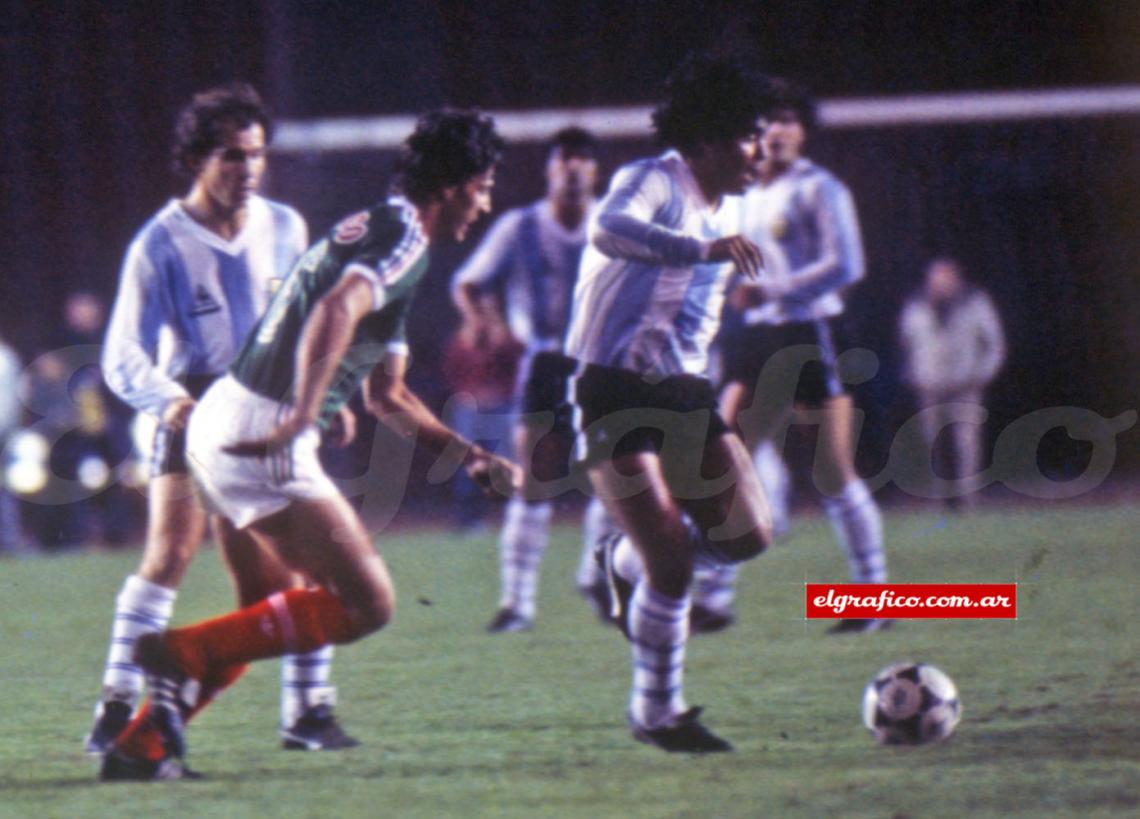
Mexico vs. Argentina in Los Angeles, 1985

Mexico hosted the 1970 World Cup and kicked off their campaign with a scoreless draw against the Soviet Union, followed by a 4–0 win over El Salvador. Mexico advanced to the next round with a victory against Belgium, and in the quarter-finals, Mexico was eliminated by Italy, losing 4–1.

Mexico failed to qualify for the 1974 World Cup in West Germany, but qualified in 1978 where they suffered an early exit after three defeats: 0–6 against West Germany, 1–3 against Tunisia, and 1–3 to Poland. Mexico failed to qualify for the 1982 World Cup.

In 1986, Mexico again hosted the World Cup. Coached by Bora Milutinović, Mexico was placed in Group B where they defeated Belgium 2–1, drew 1–1 with Paraguay, and defeated Iraq 1–0. El Tri topped their group, and advanced to the next round where they defeated Bulgaria 2–0. In the quarter-finals, Mexico lost to West Germany 1–4 in a penalty shootout after the match finished 0–0.

==== 1990s ====
Mexico was disqualified from the 1990 FIFA World Cup (and other international competitions) after using players over the age limit in the qualifying round for the 1989 FIFA World Youth Championship, known as the "Cachirules" scandal. The punishment was applied to all Mexico national representatives of all FIFA-sanctioned tournaments.

In the 1990s, after hiring coach César Luis Menotti, Mexican football began experiencing greater international success. In the 1993 Copa América they finished second, losing to Argentina 2–1 in the final. At the 1994 FIFA World Cup in the United States, Mexico won its group on tiebreakers, emerging from a group composed of Italy, Ireland, and Norway. However, Mexico lost in the round of 16 to Bulgaria on penalty kicks.

At the 1998 FIFA World Cup, Mexico was placed in a group with the Netherlands, South Korea and Belgium. Mexico won their opening fixture 3–1 against South Korea, drew Belgium 2–2, and against the Netherlands with the same score, qualifying for the round of 16. In that round, Mexico lost 2–1 to Germany.

In 1999, Mexico won its first official FIFA tournament by becoming the first host nation to win the FIFA Confederations Cup. Mexico defeated the United States 1–0 in the semi-finals, and 1998 World Cup runners-up Brazil 4–3 in the final.

=== 21st century ===
==== 2000s ====
Mexico was placed in Group G at the 2002 World Cup alongside Italy, Croatia, and Ecuador. Mexico started with a 1–0 win over Croatia. In the second match, Mexico earned a 2–1 win over Ecuador. Mexico then achieved a 1–1 draw against Italy. In the round of 16, Mexico played rivals United States, losing 2–0.

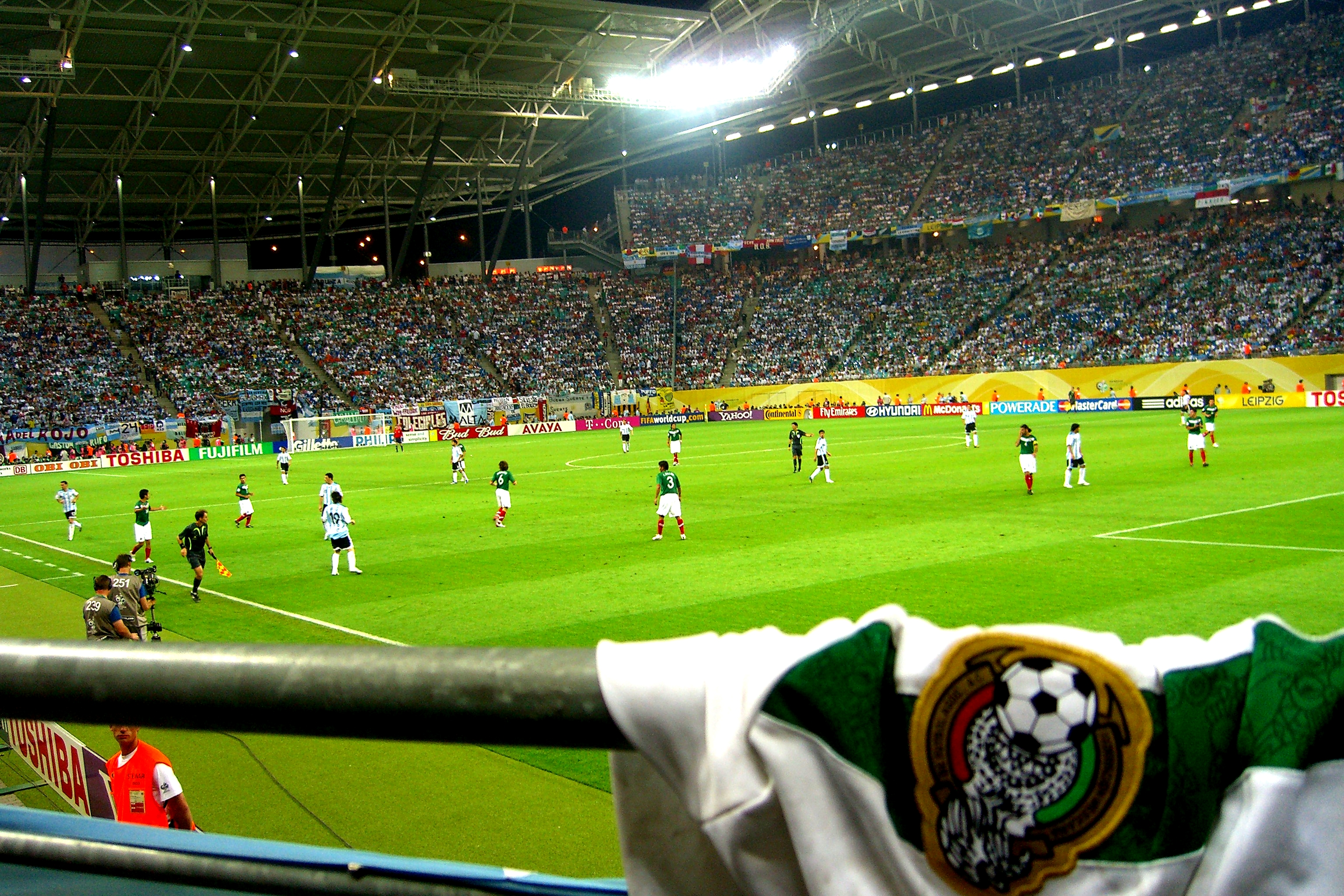
Mexico against Argentina at the 2006 FIFA World Cup

Mexico was one of eight seeded teams at the 2006 World Cup in Germany, and entered Group D, being drawn with Iran, Angola and Portugal. Mexico won their opening match 3–1 against Iran. In their second match, Mexico played to a 0–0 draw against Angola. After losing to Portugal 2–1, Mexico reached the round of 16, where they would be eliminated again, this time to Argentina, 2–1. Mexico's coach Ricardo Lavolpe stepped down after the tournament, and was succeeded by Hugo Sánchez.

After losing the final match of the 2007 CONCACAF Gold Cup 1–2 against the United States, Mexico successfully rebounded at the 2007 Copa América. Beginning by beating Brazil 2–0, they then defeated Ecuador and tied with Chile to come first in Group B. In the quarter-finals, Mexico beat Paraguay 6–0, but lost in the semi-finals 3–0 to Argentina. Mexico secured third place against Uruguay, winning 3–1.

In July 2009, Mexico won their fifth Gold Cup, and eighth CONCACAF Championship overall, after beating the United States 5–0 in the final.

==== 2010s ====
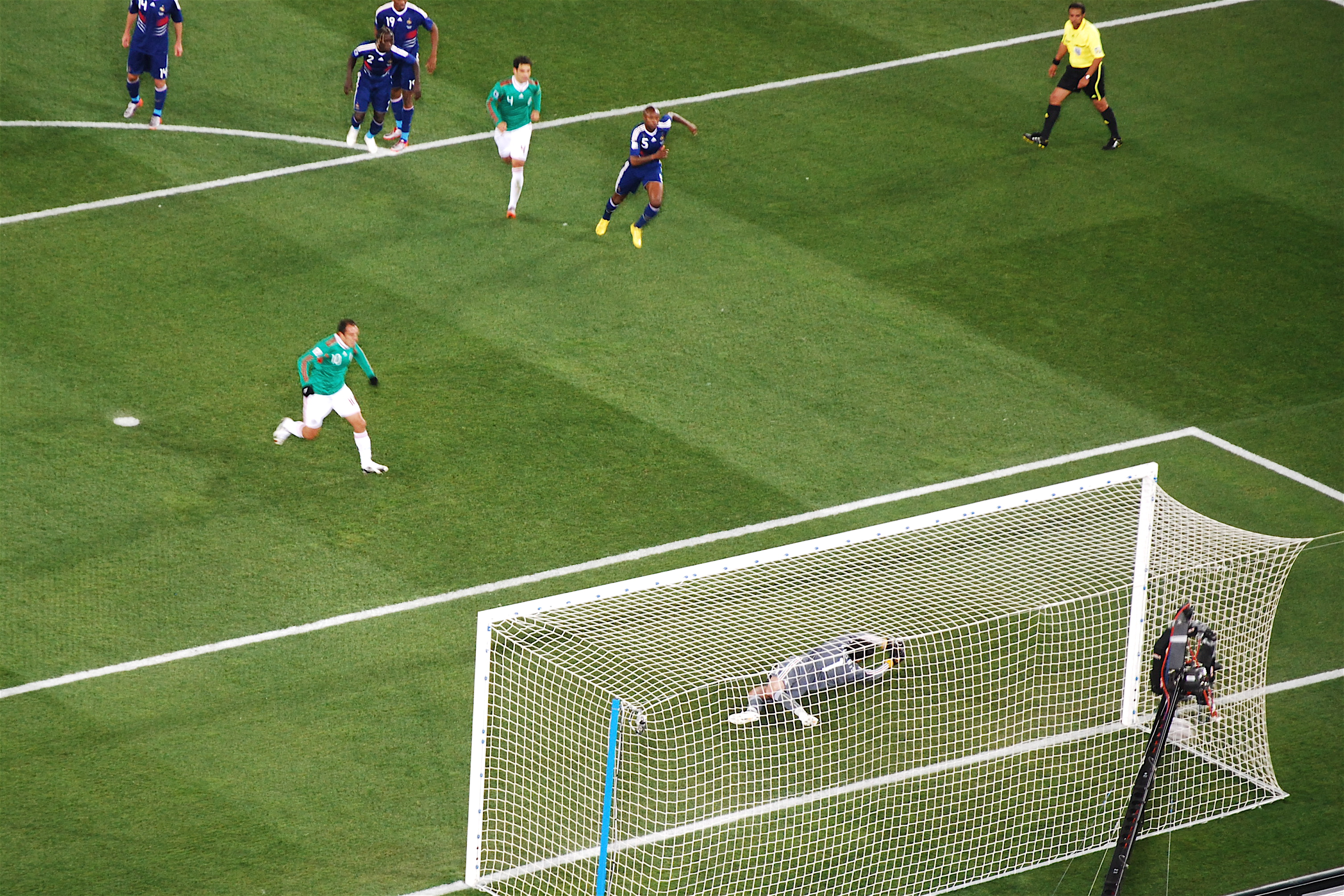
Cuauhtémoc Blanco converting his penalty kick against France at the 2010 FIFA World Cup

Mexico qualified for the 2010 FIFA World Cup, where they were drawn into Group A alongside host South Africa, France and Uruguay. They drew 1–1 against South Africa, defeated France 2–0, and lost 1–0 to Uruguay, and advanced to the round of 16, where they were eliminated following another defeat to Argentina, 1–3.

The 2011 CONCACAF Gold Cup saw Mexico win their group with three wins and no losses. During the tournament, however, five players tested positive for the banned substance clenbuterol and were suspended from the competition. Mexico beat Guatemala in the quarter-finals 2–1, and Honduras 2–0 in the semi-finals. For the third-straight year, the final would be contested between Mexico and the United States; Mexico won the match 4–2, and qualified for the 2013 FIFA Confederations Cup in Brazil, where they were eliminated at the group stage.

Mexico placed second in their group at the 2013 CONCACAF Gold Cup, and advanced to the semi-finals and faced Panama. Mexico lost the match 2–1, their second defeat to Panama in the competition after losing to them in the group stage. The two losses to Panama were the first two times Panama had ever defeated Mexico in a Gold Cup match.

Mexico won only two of ten matches during the fourth round of 2014 World Cup qualifying, but qualified for an intercontinental play-off as the fourth-highest placed team in the CONCACAF region. They defeated New Zealand 9–3 on aggregate to qualify for a sixth consecutive World Cup. The team reached the round of 16 where they were defeated 2–1 by the Netherlands.

At the 2015 CONCACAF Gold Cup, Mexico was drawn into Group C along with Trinidad and Tobago, Cuba and Guatemala. The team placed second in the group, and won the quarterfinal match against Costa Rica and semi-final against Panama, both under controversial circumstances. Mexico won the Gold Cup after defeating Jamaica 3–1 in the final. Two days after the final, Miguel Herrera was released as coach of the national team after an alleged physical altercation with TV Azteca announcer Christian Martinoli. On 10 October, Mexico defeated the United States 3–2 to win the inaugural edition of the CONCACAF Cup, thus earning qualification to the 2017 FIFA Confederations Cup in Russia. The following month, Juan Carlos Osorio was hired as Mexico's 16th manager, replacing interim manager Ricardo Ferretti.

Mexico entered the Copa América Centenario, hosted in the United States, on a 19-match unbeaten streak that began in June 2015. El Tri placed first in Group C, winning 3–1 over Uruguay and 2–0 over Jamaica, and drawing 1–1 with Venezuela. In the quarter-final against Chile in Santa Clara, California, the team lost 7–0, ending the unbeaten streak at 22 after nearly a year. After the match, manager Osorio apologized to Mexico's fans for what he described as an "embarrassment, an accident of football".

At the 2017 Confederations Cup, Mexico was drawn into Group A along with Portugal, New Zealand, and hosts Russia. El Tri advanced as runners-up of the group, and lost 4–1 to Germany in the semi-finals. Mexico finished fourth in the tournament, losing 2–1 to Portugal in the third-place match.

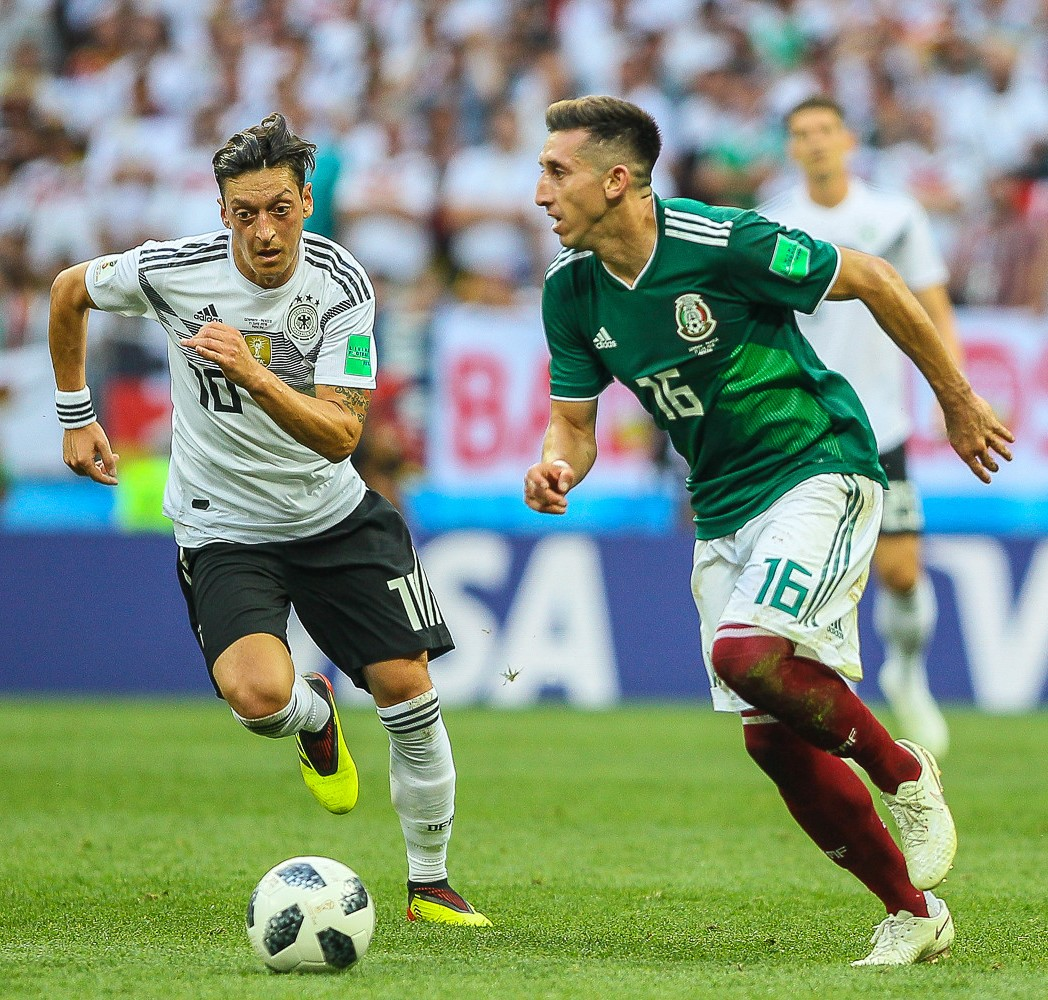
Héctor Herrera and Mesut Özil (Mexico v Germany) at the 2018 FIFA World Cup

In their opening match of the 2018 FIFA World Cup, Mexico defeated defending champion Germany, thanks to a sole goal from Hirving Lozano, for the first time in a World Cup match. They would go on to defeat South Korea 2–1 in their next match, with goals from Carlos Vela and Javier Hernández, before falling 3–0 to Sweden in the last group stage match. Despite the loss, Mexico qualified to the round of 16 for the seventh-consecutive tournament. In the round of 16, Mexico was defeated 2–0 by Brazil; the defeat meant that for the seventh tournament in a row, Mexico failed to reach the quarterfinals since they last hosted the World Cup in 1986. On 28 July, Juan Carlos Osorio left as head coach on the expiry of his contract.

In January 2019, Gerardo Martino was appointed as Mexico's new head coach, becoming the third Argentine to coach the national team. In that year's Gold Cup tournament, they won all three group stage matches, defeated Costa Rica in penalties 5–4 following a 1–1 draw in the quarter-final and won against Haiti in the semi-final. Mexico won the Gold Cup after defeating the United States 1–0 in the final.

==== 2020s ====
Mexico finished runners-up in the 2021 CONCACAF Nations League Final and the 2021 CONCACAF Gold Cup, both in losses to the United States. At the 2022 FIFA World Cup in Qatar, Mexico finished third in Group C behind Argentina and Poland (due to goal difference), making it the first time since 1978 that Mexico were eliminated in the group stage (the 1982 and 1990 World Cup tournaments, in which Mexico did not participate, notwithstanding). This led to the end of Mexico's streak of reaching the round of 16 (which it had done in the previous seven World Cups), and as a result head coach Gerardo Martino stepped down immediately after the elimination.

In February 2023, Diego Cocca was appointed as the new head coach, the fourth Argentine to take the job. The same month, Mexico automatically qualified for the 2026 World Cup as co-host. In the 2023 CONCACAF Nations League semi-finals, Mexico suffered a 0–3 defeat to the United States, which caused even more widespread outrage in Mexico. They defeated Panama 1–0 in the third place match that was largely boycotted by Mexican fans; the following day, Cocca was dismissed from his post, with Jaime Lozano appointed on an interim basis to take charge for the forthcoming Gold Cup. Mexico won the tournament, defeating Panama 1–0 in the final. After the win, Lozano was appointed as head coach on a permanent basis. However, following an underwhelming group stage exit from the 2024 Copa América, on 16 July, Lozano was dismissed from his position. Six days later, Javier Aguirre was named Mexico's new head coach, his third spell with the national side. In March 2025, Mexico won its first Nations League title, beating Panama 2–1 in the final at SoFi Stadium.

== Home stadium ==
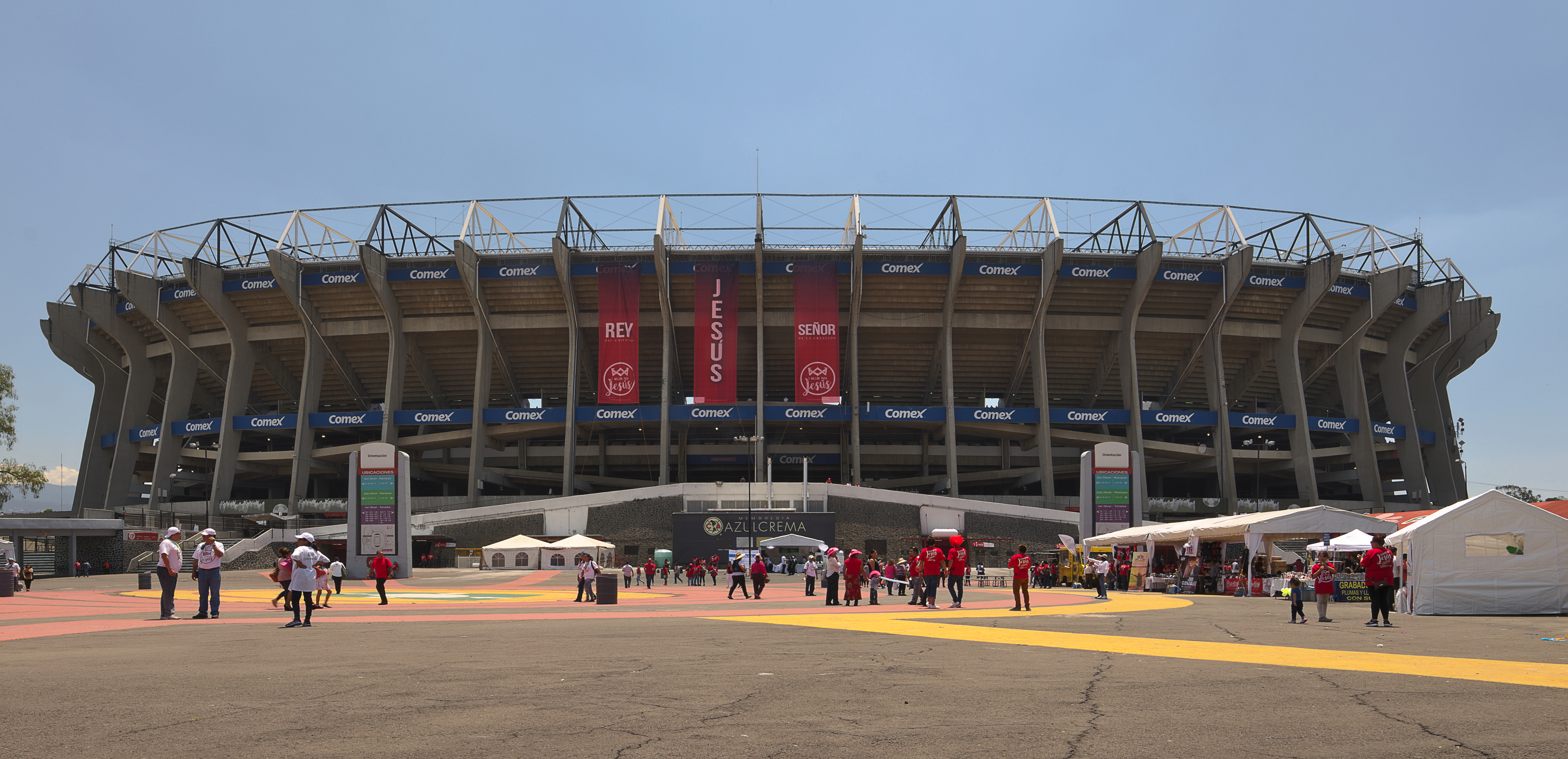
Azteca Stadium is the home of the Mexico national team.

The Estadio Azteca, also known in Spanish as "El Coloso de Santa Úrsula", was built in 1966. It is the official home stadium of the Mexico national team, as well as the Mexican club team Club América. It has an official capacity of 87,523, making it the largest football-specific stadium in the Americas and the third largest football stadium in the world. The stadium hosted the FIFA World Cup Final in 1970 and 1986, and the stadium hosted the tournament again in 2026.

Friendly matches hosted by the Mexico national team often take place in stadiums across the United States, which are marketed under the branding MEXTOUR by FMF. From 2000 to 2019, the national team played 110 friendlies in the United States, which were criticized as "cash grabs" by fans. In 2022, the team played 15 matches in the United States and averaged over 52,000 in attendance at each of them; several were played at AT&T Stadium in Dallas, which El Tri head coach Jaime Lozano labeled as "the second home of the Mexican national team". Additional friendlies under the MEXTOUR brand are also played in Mexico, including at the Azteca for special occasions.

== Team image ==
=== Kit ===
The Mexico national team traditionally uses a tricolor system, composed of green shirts, white shorts and red socks, which originate from the national flag of Mexico, known as the tricolor. Until the mid-1950s, Mexico wore a predominantly maroon kit, with black or dark blue shorts.

In 2015, Adidas released a new all-black color scheme for Mexico's home kit. Green, white and red remain as accent colors.

In 2017, the Mexico national team's jerseys were updated to reflect their Spanish names correctly spelled, with the accent diacritic mark.

==== Kit suppliers ====
| Kit supplier | Period |
|---|---|
| (United States) Levi's | 1978–1979 |
| (United States) Pony | 1980–1983 |
| (West Germany) Adidas | 1983–1990 |
| (England) Umbro | 1991–1994 |
| (Mexico) Aba Sport | 1995–1998 |
| (Mexico) Garcis | 1999–2000 |
| (Mexico) Atletica | 2000–2002 |
| (United States) Nike | 2003–2006 |
| (West Germany) Adidas | 2007–present |

=== Media coverage ===
All of Mexico matches are shown live on both over-the-air networks Televisa and TV Azteca in Mexico until 2034 but in 2027, 2028, and 2029, the Mexico matches during CONCACAF Nations League final four and Gold Cup is excluded on the package after the American OTT streaming platform Netflix scores the new big deal with CONCACAF for viewers in Mexico. In the United States all of Mexico's international friendlies and home World Cup qualifiers are shown on Spanish language network Univision while away World Cup qualifiers are shown on Telemundo. On 30 January 2013, English language network ESPN and Univision announced an agreement to telecast the Mexico national team home World Cup qualifiers and international friendly matches in English in the United States.

=== Supporters ===
==== "¡Eh, puto!" ====
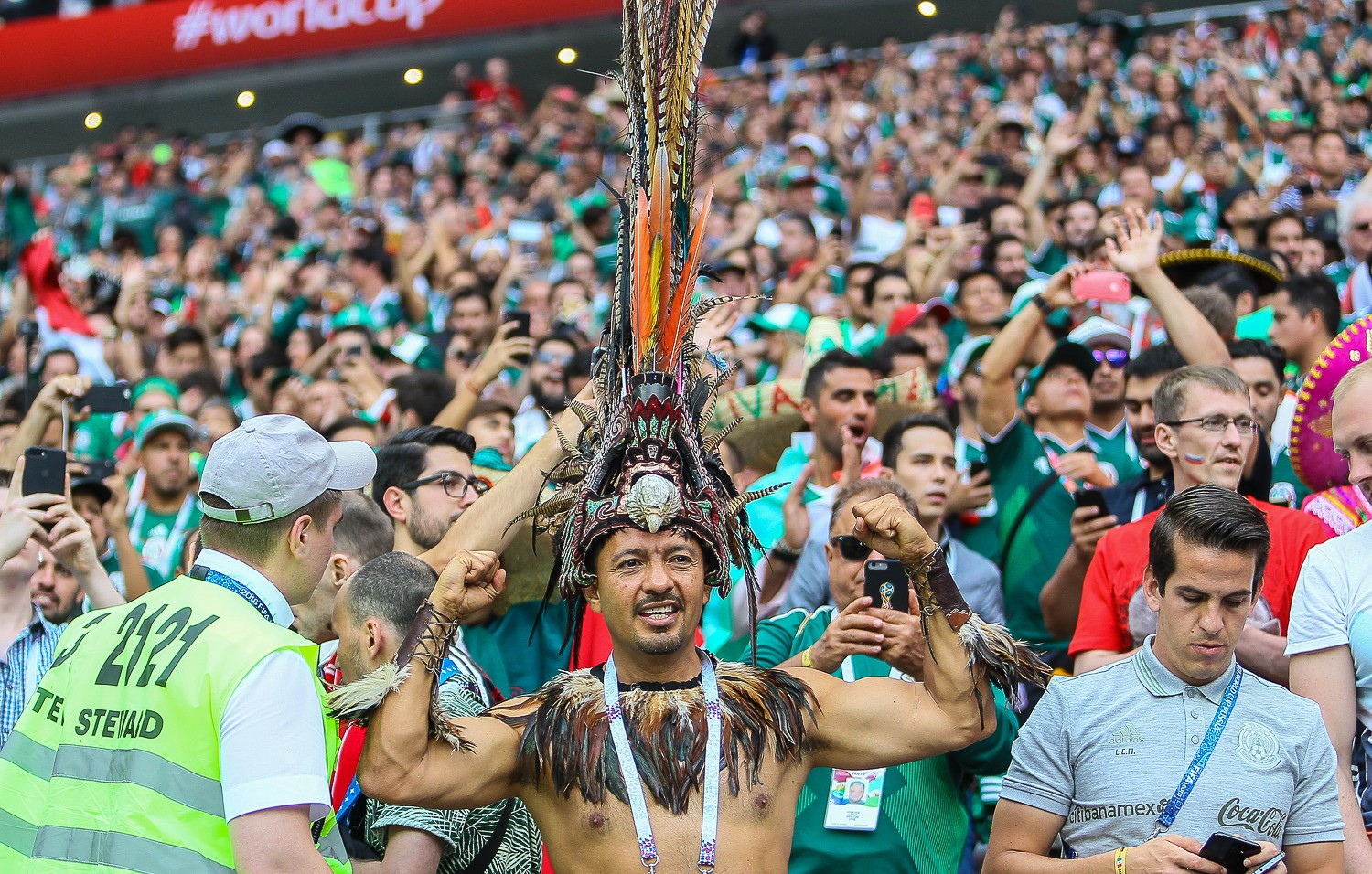
Mexico's fans at 2018 FIFA World Cup in Russia

Mexico's fans are infamously known for the vulgar chant "¡Eh, puto!", which is typically said when an opponent's goalkeeper is about to perform a goal kick.

The origins of the chant is thought to have had developed in the 1980s in Monterrey where in little league American football games, fans would chant "¡Eh, pum!" during the opening kickoff. This chant was not disparagingly used as the word pum is attributed to an impact of some sort. Though the current incarnation of the chant is widely thought to have originated sometime between 2000 and 2003 by supporters of Atlas to former Atlas goalkeeper, Oswaldo Sánchez, no primary sources exist that support this claim and is an urban legend. The earliest documented usage of puto being chanted by fans in this manner occurred on 22 May 2004, during the second leg of the 2004 Clausura repechage match between Cruz Azul and Pachuca. Fans of Pachuca repeatedly chanted puto every time Óscar Pérez performed a goal kick.

===== Sanctions =====
Due to the homophobic meaning of the word puto in Mexican Spanish (a vulgar term for a male prostitute), the chant received negative attention in the 2014 FIFA World Cup. Mexico's fans defended it as being traditionally used in the Liga MX. On 23 June 2014, FIFA dropped an investigation, concluding that the chant "was not considered insulting in the specific context". Football Against Racism in Europe, an anti-discrimination organization, criticized the ruling as "disappointing". In 2017, in advance of the 2018 World Cup, FIFA fined the Mexico football federation over fans' use of the chant and introduced escalating sanctions, which were first applied in Liga MX games in 2019. In 2021, three Mexico international matches in the United States were halted because of fan behaviour, including the CONCACAF Nations League final against the United States, in which fans also threw things onto the pitch and Giovanni Reyna was hit in the face by a heavy object. On 18 June 2021, FIFA announced that as a penalty for the use of the chant in a pre-Olympics tournament in Guadalajara, spectators would be barred from Mexico's first two qualifying matches for the 2022 World Cup. During the semi-finals, the match between Mexico and the United States was stopped at the 90th minute and eventually ended early due to the chants.

== Rivalries ==
=== United States ===
Mexico and the United States are widely considered as the two top teams in CONCACAF. Matches between the two nations often attract media attention, public interest and discourse in both countries. Although the first match was played in 1934, their rivalry was not considered major until the late 20th century, when the U.S. emerged as a solid international side.

Mexico met the United States in the round of 16 of the 2002 World Cup, losing 2–0. Ten years later, on 15 August 2012, the United States defeated Mexico at Estadio Azteca in the first victory for the U.S. against Mexico on Mexican soil in 75 years. On 11 November 2016, El Tri achieved their second consecutive victory on U.S. soil, in qualification for the 2018 World Cup, by defeating the U.S. in Columbus, Ohio.

Since their first meeting in 1934, the two teams have met 78 times, with Mexico leading at 37 wins, 17 draws, and 24 losses, 147 goals scored, and 92 conceded. Mexico dominated in early years, with a 27–9–5 record through 1990. However, since that time the series has become much more competitive, largely due to growth of soccer in the United States; since 2000, the series has favored the U.S. 18–8–9, with Mexico outscored 48–33. But in the 2010s, the rivalry has been marked by Mexican success, with Mexico defeating the United States in the Gold Cup final in 2011 and 2019, and the CONCACAF Cup in 2015. In 2021, however, Mexico lost to the United States in both the CONCACAF Nations League final and the Gold Cup final. Still, Mexico remains undefeated to the United States at home soil in competitive matches, with all 19 meetings at home soil being either a win (15) or a draw (4).

=== Costa Rica ===
Mexico has a growing rivalry with Costa Rica, as Costa Rica is the first country in CONCACAF to beat Mexico on Mexican soil in FIFA World Cup qualification, known as Aztecazo. Costa Rica is also widely recognized as the only Central American national team to have sufficient quality to compete at the global stage, which increased the importance of the rivalry. Mexico holds a dominant record against Costa Rica with 32 wins, 20 draws and only 6 losses.

=== Argentina ===
Mexico has a rivalry with Argentina, given these two nations are among the most renowned Hispanic nations in the world. The rivalry is abnormal by the fact it is intercontinental, with Argentina part of CONMEBOL and Mexico part of CONCACAF. This rivalry is more keenly felt by Mexican supporters than Argentines, who typically view Brazil, Uruguay, England and Germany as bigger rivals. In fact, a number of Argentines do not consider Mexico as rivals. Mexico has historically not fared well against Argentina, recording only 4 wins, 16 losses and 12 draws.

== Results and fixtures ==
The following is a list of match results in the last 12 months, as well as any future matches that have been scheduled.

Win Draw Loss Fixture

=== 2026 ===
| 22 January Friendly | Panama | 0–1 | Mexico | Panama City, Panama |
| 20:00 UTC−5 | | Report | Peralta 90+3' (o.g.) | Stadium: Estadio Rommel Fernández; Attendance: 16,447; Referee: Guido Gonzales Jr. (United States) |

| 25 January Friendly | Bolivia | 0–1 | Mexico | Santa Cruz de la Sierra, Bolivia |
| 15:30 UTC−4 | | Report | Berterame 68' | Stadium: Estadio Ramón Tahuichi Aguilera; Attendance: 24,000; Referee: Carlos Betancur (Colombia) |

| 25 February Friendly | Mexico | 4–0 | Iceland | Querétaro, Mexico |
| 20:00 UTC−6 | Ledezma 22'; A. González 24'; Gallardo 59'; B. Gutiérrez 90+2' | Report | | Stadium: Estadio Corregidora; Attendance: 34,130; Referee: Steven Madrigal (Costa Rica) |

| 28 March Friendly | Mexico | 0–0 | Portugal | Mexico City, Mexico |
| 20:00 UTC−6 | | Report | | Stadium: Estadio Azteca; Attendance: 84,130; Referee: Walter López (Guatemala) |

| 31 March Friendly | Mexico | 1–1 | Belgium | Chicago, United States |
| 20:00 UTC−5 | J. Sánchez 19' | Report | Lukébakio 46' | Stadium: Soldier Field; Attendance: 52,412; Referee: Rosendo Mendoza (United States) |

| 22 May Friendly | Mexico | 2–0 | Ghana | Puebla, Mexico |
| 20:00 UTC−6 | B. Gutiérrez 2'; Martínez 54' | Report | | Stadium: Estadio Cuauhtémoc; Attendance: 41,235; Referee: Selvin Brown (Honduras) |

| 30 May Friendly | Mexico | 1–0 | Australia | Pasadena, United States |
| 18:00 UTC−7 | Vásquez 27' | Report | | Stadium: Rose Bowl; Attendance: 78,479; Referee: Rubiel Vazquez (United States) |

| 4 June Friendly | Mexico | 5–1 | Serbia | Toluca, Mexico |
| 20:00 UTC−6 | Vásquez 34'; Bukinac 45+3' (o.g.); Jiménez 57'; Avdić 72' (o.g.); L. Chávez 90' | Report | Stanić 19' | Stadium: Estadio Nemesio Díez; Attendance: 27,163; Referee: Keylor Herrera (Costa Rica) |

| 11 June 2026 FIFA World Cup GS | Mexico | 2–0 | South Africa | Mexico City, Mexico |
| 13:00 UTC−6 | Quiñones 9'; Jiménez 67' | Report | | Stadium: Estadio Azteca; Attendance: 80,824; Referee: Wilton Sampaio (Brazil) |

| 18 June 2026 FIFA World Cup GS | Mexico | 1–0 | South Korea | Zapopan, Mexico |
| 19:00 UTC−6 | Romo 50' | Report | | Stadium: Estadio Akron; Attendance: 45,522; Referee: Gustavo Tejera (Uruguay) |

| 24 June 2026 FIFA World Cup GS | Czech Republic | 0–3 | Mexico | Mexico City, Mexico |
| 19:00 UTC−6 | | Report | M. Chávez 55'; Quiñones 61'; Fidalgo 90+4' | Stadium: Estadio Azteca; Attendance: 80,824; Referee: Yael Falcón (Argentina) |

| 30 June 2026 FIFA World Cup R32 | Mexico | 2–0 | Ecuador | Mexico City, Mexico |
| 20:00 UTC−6 | Quiñones 22'; Jiménez 31' | Report | | Stadium: Estadio Azteca; Attendance: 80,824; Referee: Slavko Vinčić (Slovenia) |

| 5 July 2026 FIFA World Cup R16 | Mexico | 2–3 | England | Mexico City, Mexico |
| 19:00 UTC−6 | Quiñones 42'; Jiménez 69' (pen.) | Report | Bellingham 36', 38'; Kane 60' (pen.) | Stadium: Estadio Azteca; Attendance: 80,824; Referee: Alireza Faghani (Australia) |

| 26 September Friendly | Mexico | 1–1 | Colombia | Baltimore, United States |
| 21:00 UTC−4 | Mora 62' | Report | Suárez 9' | Stadium: M&T Bank Stadium; Attendance: 67,117; Referee: Guido Gonzales Jr. (United States) |

| 29 September Friendly | Mexico | 1–1 | Peru | Harrison, United States |
| 21:00 UTC−4 | Guzmán 49' | Report | Vélez 26' | Stadium: Sports Illustrated Stadium; Attendance: 25,728; Referee: Jon Freemon (United States) |

| 3 October Friendly | United States | 3–0 | Mexico | Glendale, United States |
| 19:00 UTC−7 | Hall 28'; Sullivan 62'; Tillman 84' | Report | | Stadium: State Farm Stadium; Attendance: 64,932; Referee: Selvin Brown (Honduras) |

| 6 October Friendly | Mexico | 0–2 | Chile | Los Angeles, United States |
| 19:30 UTC−7 | | Report | Gutiérrez 54'; Pizarro 65' | Stadium: Los Angeles Memorial Coliseum; Attendance: 56,529; Referee: Filip Dujic (Canada) |

| 14 November 2026–27 Nations League QF 1st Leg | Jamaica | 3–2 | Mexico | Kingston, Jamaica |
| 20:00 UTC−5 | Gallardo 27' (o.g.); Cephas 46'; King 63' (pen.) | Report | Mora 70'; Quiñones 81' (pen.) | Stadium: Independence Park; Referee: Mario Escobar (Guatemala) |

| 17 November 2026–27 Nations League QF 2nd Leg | Mexico | 1–0 (3 (a)–3 agg.) | Jamaica | Guadalupe, Mexico |
| 20:30 UTC−6 | Corona 35' | Report | | Stadium: Estadio BBVA; Attendance: 51,681; Referee: Juan Gabriel Calderón (Costa Rica) |

=== 2027 ===
| 25 March Nations League Finals SF | United States | v | Mexico | Inglewood, United States |
| | | | | Stadium: SoFi Stadium |

| 28 March Nations League Finals F/3PG | Mexico | v | Canada or Panama | Inglewood, United States |
| | | | | Stadium: SoFi Stadium |

== Coaching staff ==
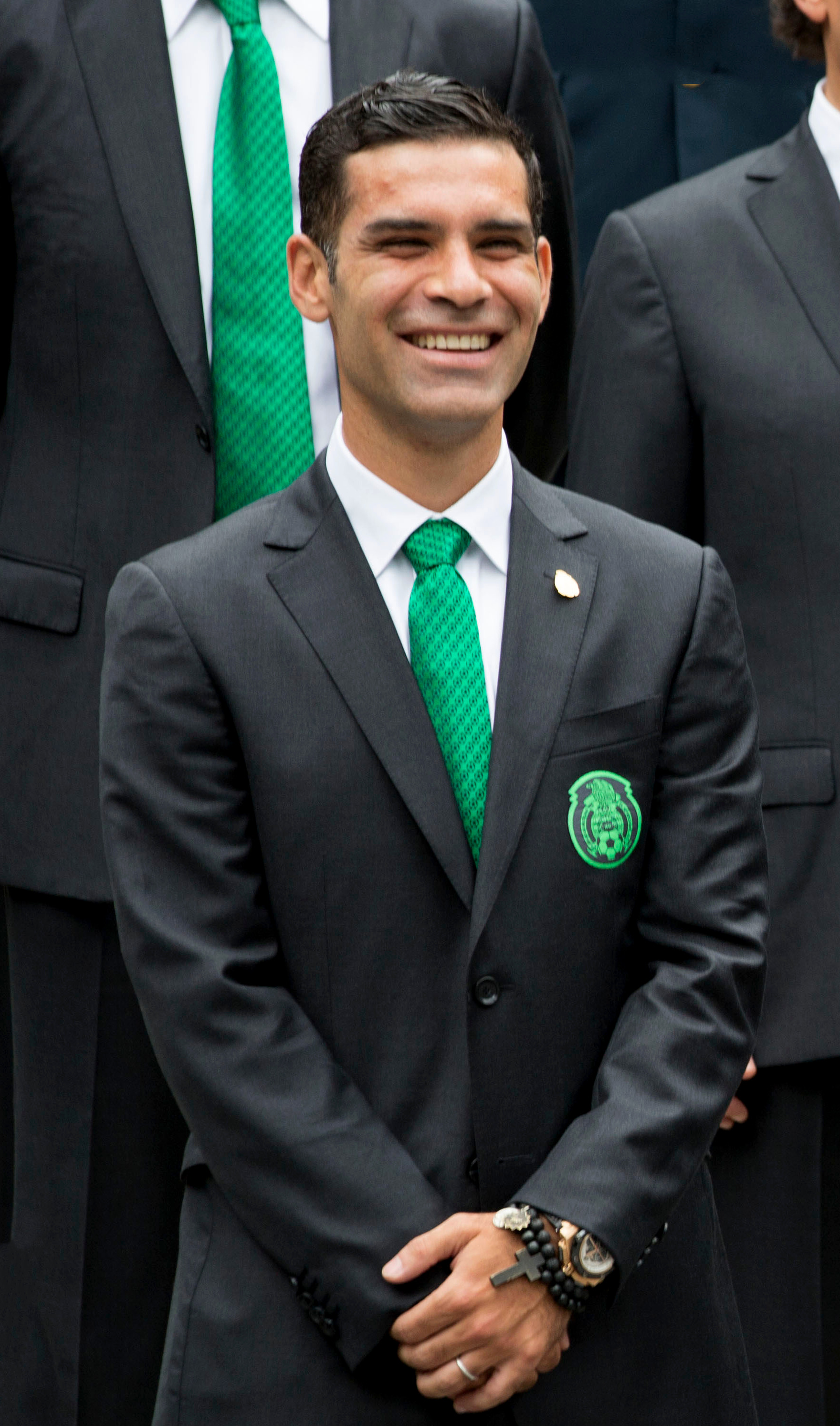
Current head coach Rafael Márquez

As of 28 August 2026

| Position | Name |
|---|---|
| Head coach | (Mexico) Rafael Márquez |
| Assistant coach | (Mexico) Andrés Guardado |
| Assistant coach | (Spain) Juan Manuel Lillo |
| Assistant coach | (Spain) Vidal Paloma |
| Goalkeeping coach | (Spain) Xabier Mancisidor |
| Fitness coach | (Spain) Pol Lorente |
| Physiotherapist | (Brazil) Carlos Peçanha |
| Team doctor | (Mexico) José Luis Serrano |

== Players ==
=== Current squad ===
The following 28 players were called up for 2026–27 CONCACAF Nations League quarter-finals matches against Jamaica on 14 and 17 November 2026.
Caps and goals correct as of 17 November 2026, after the match against Jamaica.

| No. | Pos. | Player | Date of birth (age) | Caps | Goals | Club |
|---|---|---|---|---|---|---|
| 1 | GK | Raúl Rangel | 25 February 2000 (age 26) | 23 | 0 | (Mexican Football Federation) Guadalajara |
| 12 | GK | Óscar García | 2 July 2003 (age 23) | 1 | 0 | (Mexican Football Federation) León |
| 21 | GK | Alex Padilla | 1 September 2003 (age 23) | 1 | 0 | (Royal Spanish Football Federation) Athletic Bilbao |
| 2 | DF | Kevin Álvarez | 15 January 1999 (age 27) | 18 | 1 | (Mexican Football Federation) América |
| 3 | DF | Rodrigo Huescas | 18 September 2003 (age 23) | 4 | 0 | (Danish Football Association) Copenhagen |
| 4 | DF | Jesús Orozco | 19 February 2002 (age 24) | 10 | 0 | (Mexican Football Federation) Cruz Azul |
| 5 | DF | Johan Vásquez | 22 October 1998 (age 28) | 54 | 3 | (Italian Football Federation) Genoa |
| 15 | DF | Israel Reyes | 23 May 2000 (age 26) | 43 | 2 | (Mexican Football Federation) América |
| 20 | DF | Mateo Chávez | 11 May 2004 (age 22) | 15 | 1 | (Royal Dutch Football Association) AZ |
| 22 | DF | Diego Campillo | 19 October 2001 (age 25) | 3 | 0 | (Mexican Football Federation) Guadalajara |
| 23 | DF | Jesús Gallardo | 15 August 1994 (age 32) | 130 | 3 | (Mexican Football Federation) Toluca |
| | DF | César Montes (captain) | 24 February 1997 (age 29) | 72 | 4 | (Russian Football Union) Lokomotiv Moscow |
| 6 | MF | Érik Lira (vice-captain) | 8 May 2000 (age 26) | 34 | 0 | (Mexican Football Federation) Cruz Azul |
| 7 | MF | Obed Vargas | 5 August 2005 (age 21) | 13 | 0 | (Royal Spanish Football Federation) Atlético Madrid |
| 8 | MF | Álvaro Fidalgo | 9 April 1997 (age 29) | 12 | 1 | (Royal Spanish Football Federation) Betis |
| 9 | MF | Santiago Sandoval | 7 August 2007 (age 19) | 5 | 0 | (Mexican Football Federation) Guadalajara |
| 10 | MF | Gilberto Mora | 14 October 2008 (age 18) | 15 | 2 | (Mexican Football Federation) Tijuana |
| 13 | MF | Andrés Montaño | 22 May 2002 (age 24) | 2 | 0 | (Mexican Football Federation) Cruz Azul |
| | MF | Luis Romo | 5 June 1995 (age 31) | 70 | 5 | (Mexican Football Federation) Guadalajara |
| | MF | Érick Sánchez | 27 September 1999 (age 27) | 38 | 3 | (Mexican Football Federation) América |
| 11 | FW | Santiago Giménez | 18 April 2001 (age 25) | 55 | 6 | (Portuguese Football Federation) Porto |
| 14 | FW | Armando González | 20 April 2003 (age 23) | 12 | 1 | (Hellenic Football Federation) Olympiacos |
| 16 | FW | Julián Quiñones | 24 March 1997 (age 29) | 29 | 7 | (Saudi Arabian Football Federation) Al-Qadsiah |
| 17 | FW | Jesús Manuel Corona | 6 January 1993 (age 33) | 73 | 11 | (Mexican Football Federation) Monterrey |
| 18 | FW | Roberto Alvarado | 7 September 1998 (age 28) | 78 | 5 | (Mexican Football Federation) Guadalajara |
| 19 | FW | Alexis Vega | 25 November 1997 (age 28) | 55 | 7 | (Mexican Football Federation) Toluca |
| | FW | Isaías Violante | 20 October 2003 (age 23) | 5 | 0 | (Mexican Football Federation) América |
| | FW | Armando León | 18 January 2000 (age 26) | 0 | 0 | (Croatian Football Federation) Osijek |

=== Recent call-ups ===
The following players have also been called up within the last twelve months.

| Pos. | Player | Date of birth (age) | Caps | Goals | Club | Latest call-up |
|---|---|---|---|---|---|---|
| GK | Guillermo Ochoa | 13 July 1985 (age 41) | 153 | 0 | Retired | 2026 FIFA World Cup |
| GK | Carlos Acevedo | 19 April 1996 (age 30) | 7 | 0 | (Mexico) Santos Laguna | 2026 FIFA World Cup |
| GK | José Antonio Rodríguez | 4 July 1992 (age 34) | 2 | 0 | (Mexico) Tijuana | 2026 FIFA World Cup ^{PRE} |
| GK | Carlos Moreno | 29 January 1998 (age 28) | 0 | 0 | (Mexico) Pachuca | 2026 FIFA World Cup ^{PRE} |
| GK | Luis Malagón | 2 March 1997 (age 29) | 19 | 0 | (Mexico) América | v. Iceland, 25 February 2026 |
| DF | Jorge Sánchez | 10 December 1997 (age 28) | 65 | 3 | (Mexico) Atlas | v. Chile, 6 October 2026 |
| DF | Víctor Guzmán | 7 March 2002 (age 24) | 7 | 1 | (Mexico) Monterrey | v. Chile, 6 October 2026 |
| DF | Everardo López | 23 March 2005 (age 21) | 6 | 0 | (Mexico) Toluca | v. Chile, 6 October 2026 |
| DF | Dagoberto Espinoza | 17 April 2004 (age 22) | 1 | 0 | (Mexico) América | v. Chile, 6 October 2026 |
| DF | Juan Echilvestre | 7 April 2007 (age 19) | 0 | 0 | (Mexico) Santos Laguna | v. Chile, 6 October 2026 ^{TRP} |
| DF | Yohan Orozco | 11 March 2007 (age 19) | 0 | 0 | (Mexico) Guadalajara | v. Chile, 6 October 2026 ^{TRP} |
| DF | Edson Álvarez | 24 October 1997 (age 29) | 102 | 7 | (England) West Ham United | 2026 FIFA World Cup |
| DF | Jesús Alberto Angulo | 30 January 1998 (age 28) | 19 | 0 | (Mexico) Tigres UANL | 2026 FIFA World Cup ^{PRE} |
| DF | Julián Araujo | 13 August 2001 (age 25) | 16 | 0 | (England) Bournemouth | 2026 FIFA World Cup ^{PRE} |
| DF | Richard Ledezma | 6 September 2000 (age 26) | 3 | 1 | (Mexico) Guadalajara | 2026 FIFA World Cup ^{PRE} |
| DF | Alejandro Gómez | 31 January 2002 (age 24) | 3 | 0 | (Mexico) Tijuana | 2026 FIFA World Cup ^{PRE} |
| DF | Eduardo Águila | 17 May 2002 (age 24) | 2 | 0 | (Mexico) Atlético San Luis | 2026 FIFA World Cup ^{PRE} |
| DF | Bryan González | 10 April 2003 (age 23) | 2 | 0 | (Mexico) Guadalajara | 2026 FIFA World Cup ^{PRE} |
| DF | Ramón Juárez | 3 May 2001 (age 25) | 2 | 0 | (Mexico) América | 2026 FIFA World Cup ^{PRE} |
| DF | Luis Rey | 14 September 2002 (age 24) | 1 | 0 | (Mexico) Guadalajara | 2026 FIFA World Cup ^{PRE} |
| DF | Jesús Garza | 6 June 2000 (age 26) | 1 | 0 | (Mexico) Tigres UANL | v. Iceland, 25 February 2026 |
| MF | Orbelín Pineda | 24 March 1996 (age 30) | 97 | 12 | (Mexico) Monterrey | v. Chile, 6 October 2026 |
| MF | Luis Chávez | 15 January 1996 (age 30) | 48 | 5 | (Russia) Dynamo Moscow | v. Chile, 6 October 2026 |
| MF | Denzell García | 15 August 2003 (age 23) | 5 | 0 | (Mexico) Juárez | v. Chile, 6 October 2026 |
| MF | Jeremy Márquez | 21 June 2000 (age 26) | 3 | 0 | (Mexico) Cruz Azul | v. Chile, 6 October 2026 |
| MF | Henrique Simeone | 12 June 2007 (age 19) | 0 | 0 | (Mexico) Tigres UANL | v. Chile, 6 October 2026 ^{TRP} |
| MF | Alan Cervantes | 17 January 1998 (age 28) | 5 | 0 | (Mexico) América | v. Colombia, 26 September 2026 ^{INJ} |
| MF | Brian Gutiérrez | 17 June 2003 (age 23) | 11 | 2 | (Mexico) Guadalajara | 2026 FIFA World Cup |
| MF | Carlos Rodríguez | 3 January 1997 (age 29) | 67 | 0 | (Mexico) Cruz Azul | 2026 FIFA World Cup ^{PRE} |
| MF | Diego Lainez | 9 June 2000 (age 26) | 33 | 3 | (Mexico) Tigres UANL | 2026 FIFA World Cup ^{PRE} |
| MF | Marcel Ruiz | 26 October 2000 (age 26) | 17 | 0 | (Mexico) Toluca | 2026 FIFA World Cup ^{PRE} |
| MF | Efraín Álvarez | 19 June 2002 (age 24) | 7 | 1 | (Mexico) Guadalajara | 2026 FIFA World Cup ^{PRE} |
| MF | Alexis Gutiérrez | 26 February 2001 (age 25) | 5 | 0 | (Mexico) América | 2026 FIFA World Cup ^{PRE} |
| MF | Jesús Ricardo Angulo | 20 February 1997 (age 29) | 3 | 1 | (Mexico) Toluca | 2026 FIFA World Cup ^{PRE} |
| MF | Kevin Castañeda | 28 October 1999 (age 27) | 3 | 0 | (Mexico) Guadalajara | 2026 FIFA World Cup ^{PRE} |
| MF | Jordán Carrillo | 30 November 2001 (age 24) | 2 | 0 | (Mexico) Guadalajara | 2026 FIFA World Cup ^{PRE} |
| MF | Jorge Ruvalcaba | 23 July 2001 (age 25) | 1 | 0 | (United States) New York Red Bulls | 2026 FIFA World Cup ^{PRE} |
| MF | Alexéi Domínguez | 3 January 2005 (age 21) | 0 | 0 | (Mexico) Pachuca | 2026 FIFA World Cup ^{PRE} |
| MF | Elías Montiel | 7 October 2005 (age 21) | 0 | 0 | (Mexico) Atlas | 2026 FIFA World Cup ^{PRE} |
| MF | Iker Fimbres | 2 June 2005 (age 21) | 1 | 0 | (Mexico) Monterrey | v. Ghana, 22 May 2026 |
| MF | Jairo Torres | 5 July 2000 (age 26) | 1 | 0 | (Mexico) Juárez | Training camp 6 May 2026 |
| FW | Germán Berterame | 13 November 1998 (age 28) | 12 | 2 | (United States) Inter Miami | v. Chile, 6 October 2026 |
| FW | Hugo Camberos | 27 January 2007 (age 19) | 2 | 0 | (Mexico) Guadalajara | v. Chile, 6 October 2026 |
| FW | Hirving Lozano | 30 July 1995 (age 31) | 76 | 18 | (United States) LA Galaxy | v. United States, 3 October 2026 ^{INJ} |
| FW | Raúl Jiménez | 5 May 1991 (age 35) | 128 | 48 | (England) Wolverhampton Wanderers | 2026 FIFA World Cup |
| FW | César Huerta | 3 December 2000 (age 25) | 27 | 3 | (Mexico) Pumas UNAM | 2026 FIFA World Cup |
| FW | Guillermo Martínez | 15 March 1995 (age 31) | 14 | 3 | (Mexico) Tigres UANL | 2026 FIFA World Cup |
| FW | Ángel Sepúlveda | 15 February 1991 (age 35) | 12 | 3 | (Mexico) Guadalajara | v. Bolivia, 25 January 2026 |
Notes: ^{INJ} = Not part of the current squad due to injury; ^{PRE} = Preliminary squad/standby; ^{SUS} = Serving suspension; ^{WD} = The player withdrew from the current squad due to non-injury issue; ^{TRP} Invited as a Training player

== Player records ==
As of 17 November 2026
Players in bold are still active with Mexico. Includes only statistics recognized by FIFA.

=== Most appearances ===
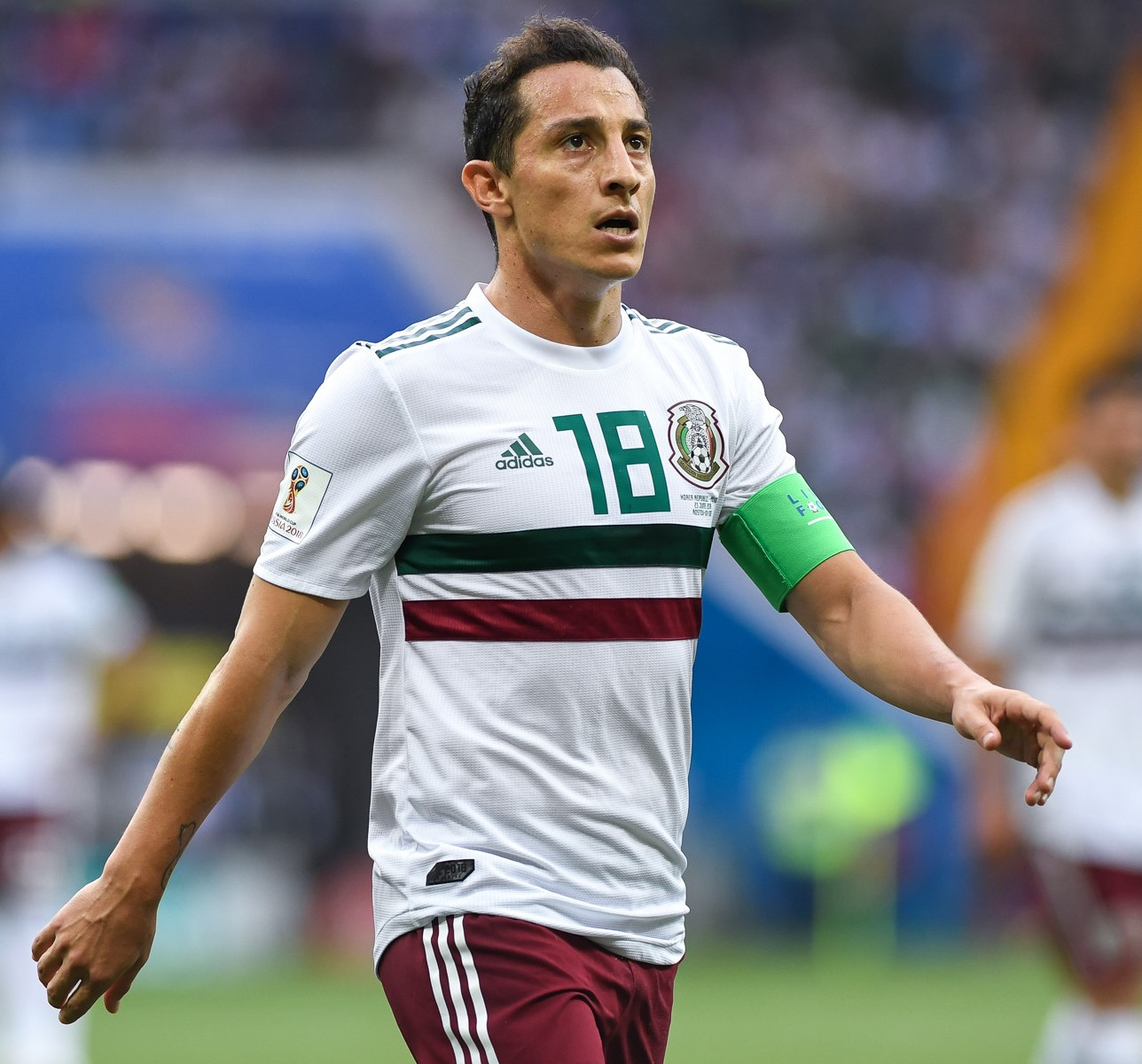
Andrés Guardado, the most capped player in the history of Mexico with 180 caps.

| Rank | Player | Caps | Goals | Career |
|---|---|---|---|---|
| 1 | Andrés Guardado | 180 | 28 | 2005–2024 |
| 2 | Claudio Suárez | 178 | 7 | 1992–2006 |
| 3 | Guillermo Ochoa | 153 | 0 | 2005–2026 |
| 4 | Pável Pardo | 147 | 11 | 1996–2009 |
| 4 | Rafael Márquez | 147 | 17 | 1997–2018 |
| 6 | Gerardo Torrado | 144 | 5 | 1999–2013 |
| 7 | Héctor Moreno | 132 | 5 | 2007–2023 |
| 8 | **Jesús Gallardo** | 130 | 3 | 2016–present |
| 9 | Jorge Campos | 129 | 0 | 1991–2003 |
| 10 | **Raúl Jiménez** | 128 | 47 | 2013–present |

=== Top goalscorers ===
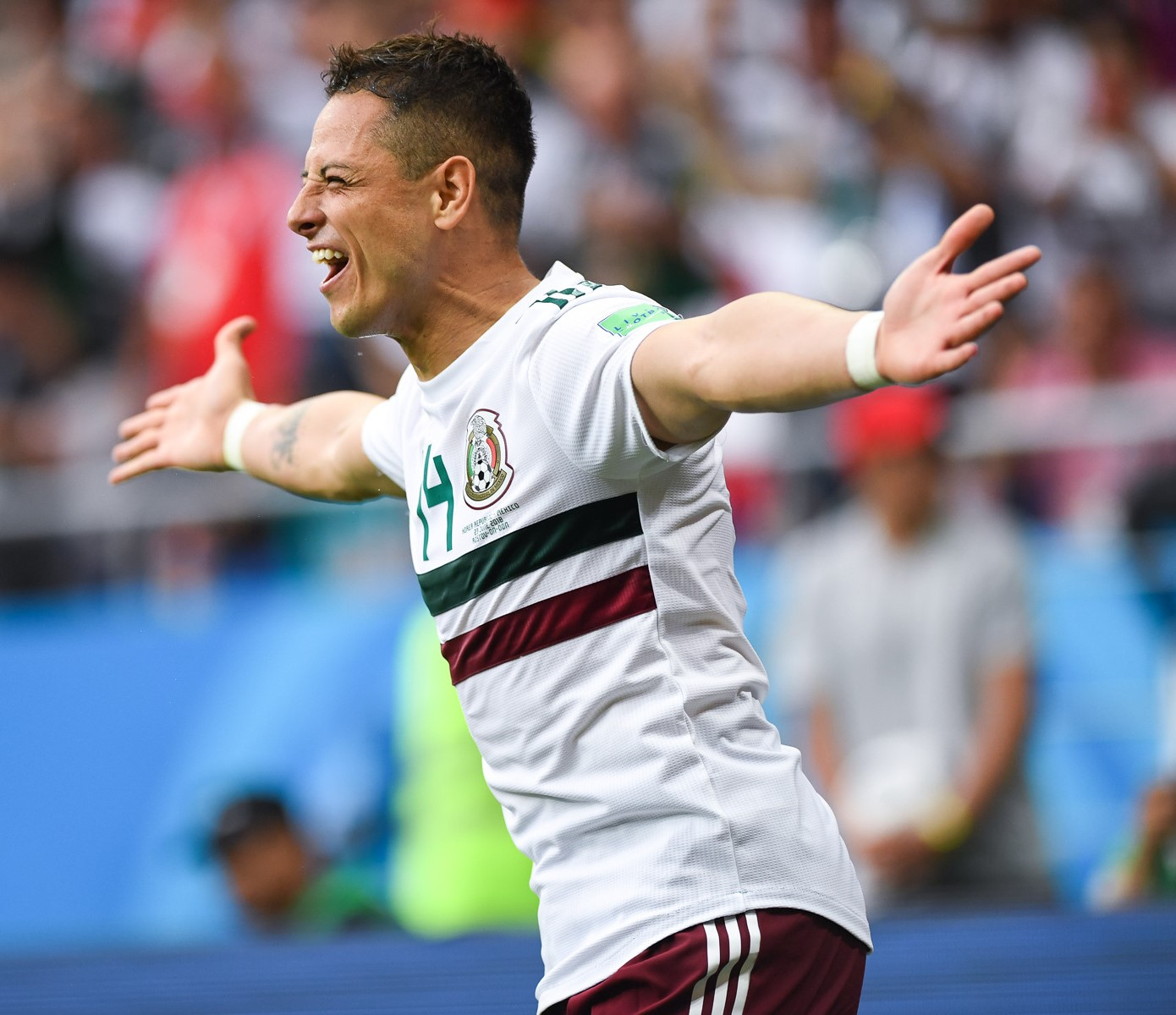
Javier Hernández, Mexico's all-time top scorer with 52 goals.

| Rank | Player | Goals | Caps | Average | Career |
|---|---|---|---|---|---|
| 1 | Javier Hernández (list) | 52 | 109 | 0.48 | 2009–2019 |
| 2 | **Raúl Jiménez** | 47 | 128 | 0.37 | 2013–present |
| 3 | Jared Borgetti (list) | 46 | 89 | 0.52 | 1997–2008 |
| 4 | Cuauhtémoc Blanco | 38 | 118 | 0.32 | 1995–2014 |
| 5 | Luis Hernández | 35 | 85 | 0.41 | 1995–2002 |
| 6 | Carlos Hermosillo | 34 | 89 | 0.38 | 1984–1997 |
| 7 | Enrique Borja | 31 | 65 | 0.48 | 1966–1975 |
| 8 | Hugo Sánchez | 29 | 58 | 0.5 | 1977–1998 |
| 9 | Luis García | 28 | 77 | 0.36 | 1991–1999 |
| 9 | Andrés Guardado | 28 | 180 | 0.16 | 2005–2024 |

== Competitive record ==
=== FIFA World Cup ===
| FIFA World Cup record | | | | | | | | | | Qualification record | | | | | |
| Year | Round | Position | Pld | W | D* | L | GF | GA | Squad | Pld | W | D | L | GF | GA |
|---|---|---|---|---|---|---|---|---|---|---|---|---|---|---|---|
| (Uruguay) 1930 | Group stage | 13th | 3 | 0 | 0 | 3 | 4 | 13 | Squad | Qualified as invitees | | | | | |
| (Italy) 1934 | Did not qualify | | | | | | | | | 4 | 3 | 0 | 1 | 14 | 7 |
| (France) 1938 | Withdrew | | | | | | | | | Withdrew | | | | | |
| (Brazil) 1950 | Group stage | 12th | 3 | 0 | 0 | 3 | 2 | 10 | Squad | 4 | 4 | 0 | 0 | 17 | 2 |
| (Switzerland) 1954 | Group stage | 13th | 2 | 0 | 0 | 2 | 2 | 8 | Squad | 4 | 4 | 0 | 0 | 19 | 1 |
| (Sweden) 1958 | Group stage | 16th | 3 | 0 | 1 | 2 | 1 | 8 | Squad | 6 | 5 | 1 | 0 | 21 | 3 |
| (Chile) 1962 | Group stage | 11th | 3 | 1 | 0 | 2 | 3 | 4 | Squad | 8 | 4 | 3 | 1 | 18 | 5 |
| (England) 1966 | Group stage | 12th | 3 | 0 | 2 | 1 | 1 | 3 | Squad | 8 | 6 | 2 | 0 | 20 | 4 |
| (Mexico) 1970 | Quarter-finals | 6th | 4 | 2 | 1 | 1 | 6 | 4 | Squad | Qualified as hosts | | | | | |
| (West Germany) 1974 | Did not qualify | | | | | | | | | 9 | 6 | 2 | 1 | 18 | 8 |
| (Argentina) 1978 | Group stage | 16th | 3 | 0 | 0 | 3 | 2 | 12 | Squad | 9 | 6 | 2 | 1 | 23 | 6 |
| (Spain) 1982 | Did not qualify | | | | | | | | | 9 | 2 | 5 | 2 | 14 | 8 |
| (Mexico) 1986 | Quarter-finals | 6th | 5 | 3 | 2 | 0 | 6 | 2 | Squad | Qualified as hosts | | | | | |
| (Italy) 1990 | Disqualified | | | | | | | | | Disqualified | | | | | |
| (United States) 1994 | Round of 16 | 13th | 4 | 1 | 2 | 1 | 4 | 4 | Squad | 12 | 9 | 1 | 2 | 39 | 8 |
| (France) 1998 | Round of 16 | 13th | 4 | 1 | 2 | 1 | 8 | 7 | Squad | 16 | 8 | 6 | 2 | 37 | 13 |
| (South Korea) (Japan) 2002 | Round of 16 | 11th | 4 | 2 | 1 | 1 | 4 | 4 | Squad | 16 | 9 | 3 | 4 | 33 | 11 |
| (Germany) 2006 | Round of 16 | 15th | 4 | 1 | 1 | 2 | 5 | 5 | Squad | 18 | 15 | 1 | 2 | 67 | 10 |
| (South Africa) 2010 | Round of 16 | 14th | 4 | 1 | 1 | 2 | 4 | 5 | Squad | 18 | 11 | 2 | 5 | 36 | 18 |
| (Brazil) 2014 | Round of 16 | 10th | 4 | 2 | 1 | 1 | 5 | 3 | Squad | 18 | 10 | 5 | 3 | 31 | 14 |
| (Russia) 2018 | Round of 16 | 12th | 4 | 2 | 0 | 2 | 3 | 6 | Squad | 16 | 11 | 4 | 1 | 29 | 8 |
| (Qatar) 2022 | Group stage | 22nd | 3 | 1 | 1 | 1 | 2 | 3 | Squad | 14 | 8 | 4 | 2 | 17 | 8 |
| (Canada) (Mexico) (United States) 2026 | Round of 16 | 9th | 5 | 4 | 0 | 1 | 10 | 3 | Squad | Qualified as co-hosts | | | | | |
| (Morocco) (Portugal) (Spain) 2030 | To be determined | | | | | | | | | To be determined | | | | | |
| (Saudi Arabia) 2034 | To be determined | | | | | | | | | To be determined | | | | | |
| Total | Quarter-finals | 18/23 | 65 | 21 | 15 | 29 | 72 | 104 | — | 189 | 121 | 41 | 27 | 453 | 134 |

=== CONCACAF Gold Cup ===
| CONCACAF Championship / Gold Cup record | | | | | | | | | | Qualification record | | | | | |
| Year | Round | Position | Pld | W | D* | L | GF | GA | Squad | Pld | W | D | L | GF | GA |
|---|---|---|---|---|---|---|---|---|---|---|---|---|---|---|---|
| (El Salvador) 1963 | Group stage | 7th | 3 | 1 | 1 | 1 | 9 | 2 | Squad | Qualified automatically | | | | | |
| (Guatemala) 1965 | Champions | 1st | 5 | 4 | 1 | 0 | 13 | 2 | Squad | Qualified automatically | | | | | |
| (Honduras) 1967 | Runners-up | 2nd | 5 | 4 | 0 | 1 | 10 | 1 | Squad | Qualified as defending champions | | | | | |
| (Costa Rica) 1969 | Fourth place | 4th | 5 | 1 | 2 | 2 | 4 | 5 | — | 2 | 1 | 0 | 1 | 4 | 2 |
| (Trinidad and Tobago) 1971 | Champions | 1st | 5 | 4 | 1 | 0 | 6 | 1 | — | 2 | 2 | 0 | 0 | 6 | 0 |
| (Haiti) 1973 | Third place | 3rd | 5 | 2 | 2 | 1 | 10 | 5 | — | 4 | 4 | 0 | 0 | 8 | 3 |
| (Mexico) 1977 | Champions | 1st | 5 | 5 | 0 | 0 | 20 | 5 | — | 4 | 1 | 2 | 1 | 3 | 1 |
| (Honduras) 1981 | Third place | 3rd | 5 | 1 | 3 | 1 | 6 | 3 | — | 4 | 1 | 2 | 1 | 8 | 5 |
| 1985 | Did not participate, it hosted the 1986 FIFA World Cup | | | | | | | | | — | | | | | |
| 1989 | Banned | | | | | | | | | Banned | | | | | |
| (United States) 1991 | Third place | 3rd | 5 | 3 | 1 | 1 | 10 | 5 | Squad | Qualified automatically | | | | | |
| (Mexico) (United States) 1993 | Champions | 1st | 5 | 4 | 1 | 0 | 28 | 2 | Squad | Qualified automatically | | | | | |
| (United States) 1996 | Champions | 1st | 4 | 4 | 0 | 0 | 9 | 0 | Squad | Qualified automatically | | | | | |
| (United States) 1998 | Champions | 1st | 4 | 4 | 0 | 0 | 8 | 2 | Squad | Qualified automatically | | | | | |
| (United States) 2000 | Quarter-finals | 7th | 3 | 1 | 1 | 1 | 6 | 3 | Squad | Qualified automatically | | | | | |
| (United States) 2002 | Quarter-finals | 5th | 3 | 2 | 1 | 0 | 4 | 1 | Squad | Qualified automatically | | | | | |
| (Mexico) (United States) 2003 | Champions | 1st | 5 | 4 | 1 | 0 | 9 | 0 | Squad | Qualified automatically | | | | | |
| (United States) 2005 | Quarter-finals | 6th | 4 | 2 | 0 | 2 | 7 | 4 | Squad | Qualified automatically | | | | | |
| (United States) 2007 | Runners-up | 2nd | 6 | 4 | 0 | 2 | 7 | 5 | Squad | Qualified automatically | | | | | |
| (United States) 2009 | Champions | 1st | 6 | 5 | 1 | 0 | 15 | 2 | Squad | Qualified automatically | | | | | |
| (United States) 2011 | Champions | 1st | 6 | 6 | 0 | 0 | 22 | 4 | Squad | Qualified automatically | | | | | |
| (United States) 2013 | Semi-finals | 3rd | 5 | 3 | 0 | 2 | 8 | 5 | Squad | Qualified automatically | | | | | |
| (Canada) (United States) 2015 | Champions | 1st | 6 | 4 | 2 | 0 | 16 | 6 | Squad | Qualified automatically | | | | | |
| (United States) 2017 | Semi-finals | 3rd | 5 | 3 | 1 | 1 | 6 | 2 | Squad | Qualified automatically | | | | | |
| (United States) (Costa Rica) (Jamaica) 2019 | Champions | 1st | 6 | 5 | 1 | 0 | 16 | 4 | Squad | Qualified automatically | | | | | |
| (United States) 2021 | Runners-up | 2nd | 6 | 4 | 1 | 1 | 9 | 2 | Squad | 4 | 4 | 0 | 0 | 13 | 3 |
| (Canada) (United States) 2023 | Champions | 1st | 6 | 5 | 0 | 1 | 13 | 2 | Squad | 4 | 2 | 2 | 0 | 8 | 3 |
| (Canada) (United States) 2025 | Champions | 1st | 6 | 5 | 1 | 0 | 10 | 3 | Squad | 4 | 3 | 0 | 1 | 8 | 3 |
| Total | 13 Titles | 26/28 | 129 | 90 | 22 | 17 | 281 | 76 | — | 28 | 18 | 6 | 4 | 58 | 20 |

=== CONCACAF Nations League ===
CONCACAF Nations League record
| League phase | | | | | | | | | | | Final phase | | | | | | | | |
| Season | Division | Group | Seed | Pld | W | D | L | GF | GA | P/R | Finals | Result | Pld | W | D | L | GF | GA | Squad |
|---|---|---|---|---|---|---|---|---|---|---|---|---|---|---|---|---|---|---|---|
| 2019–20 | A | B | 1st | 4 | 4 | 0 | 0 | 13 | 3 | Same position | (United States) 2021 | Runners-up | 2 | 0 | 1 | 1 | 2 | 3 | Squad |
| 2022–23 | A | A | 4th | 4 | 2 | 2 | 0 | 8 | 3 | Same position | (United States) 2023 | Third place | 2 | 1 | 0 | 1 | 1 | 3 | Squad |
| 2023–24 | Bye | | 1st | N/A | | | | | | Same position | (United States) 2024 | Runners-up | 4 | 2 | 0 | 2 | 5 | 4 | Squad |
| 2024–25 | Bye | | 1st | N/A | | | | | | Same position | (United States) 2025 | Champions | 4 | 3 | 0 | 1 | 8 | 3 | Squad |
| 2026–27 | Bye | | TBD | N/A | | | | | | Same position | (United States) 2027 | To be determined | | | | | | | |
| Total | | | | 8 | 6 | 2 | 0 | 21 | 6 | — | Total | 1 Title | 12 | 6 | 1 | 5 | 16 | 13 | — |

=== Copa América ===
Copa América record
| Year | Round | Position | Pld | W | D* | L | GF | GA | Squad |
|---|---|---|---|---|---|---|---|---|---|
| (Ecuador) 1993 | Runners-up | 2nd | 6 | 2 | 2 | 2 | 9 | 7 | Squad |
| (Uruguay) 1995 | Quarter-finals | 7th | 4 | 1 | 2 | 1 | 5 | 4 | Squad |
| (Bolivia) 1997 | Third place | 3rd | 6 | 2 | 2 | 2 | 8 | 9 | Squad |
| (Paraguay) 1999 | Third place | 3rd | 6 | 3 | 1 | 2 | 10 | 9 | Squad |
| (Colombia) 2001 | Runners-up | 2nd | 6 | 3 | 1 | 2 | 5 | 3 | Squad |
| (Peru) 2004 | Quarter-finals | 6th | 4 | 2 | 1 | 1 | 5 | 7 | Squad |
| (Venezuela) 2007 | Third place | 3rd | 6 | 4 | 1 | 1 | 13 | 5 | Squad |
| (Argentina) 2011 | Group stage | 12th | 3 | 0 | 0 | 3 | 1 | 4 | Squad |
| (Chile) 2015 | Group stage | 11th | 3 | 0 | 2 | 1 | 4 | 5 | Squad |
| (United States) 2016 | Quarter-finals | 7th | 4 | 2 | 1 | 1 | 6 | 9 | Squad |
| (United States) 2024 | Group stage | 9th | 3 | 1 | 1 | 1 | 1 | 1 | Squad |
| Total | Runners-up | Invitation (11) | 51 | 20 | 14 | 17 | 67 | 63 | — |

=== FIFA Confederations Cup ===
FIFA Confederations Cup record
| Year | Round | Position | Pld | W | D* | L | GF | GA | Squad |
|---|---|---|---|---|---|---|---|---|---|
| (Saudi Arabia) 1992 | Did not qualify | | | | | | | | |
| (Saudi Arabia) 1995 | Third place | 3rd | 3 | 1 | 2 | 0 | 4 | 2 | Squad |
| (Saudi Arabia) 1997 | Group stage | 5th | 3 | 1 | 0 | 2 | 8 | 6 | Squad |
| (Mexico) 1999 | Champions | 1st | 5 | 4 | 1 | 0 | 13 | 6 | Squad |
| (South Korea) (Japan) 2001 | Group stage | 8th | 3 | 0 | 0 | 3 | 1 | 8 | Squad |
| (France) 2003 | Did not qualify | | | | | | | | |
| (Germany) 2005 | Fourth place | 4th | 5 | 2 | 2 | 1 | 7 | 6 | Squad |
| (South Africa) 2009 | Did not qualify | | | | | | | | |
| (Brazil) 2013 | Group stage | 6th | 3 | 1 | 0 | 2 | 3 | 5 | Squad |
| (Russia) 2017 | Fourth place | 4th | 5 | 2 | 1 | 2 | 8 | 10 | Squad |
| Total | 1 Title | 7/10 | 27 | 11 | 6 | 10 | 44 | 43 | — |

=== Olympic Games ===
Olympic Games record
| Year | Round | Position | Pld | W | D* | L | GF | GA | Squad |
|---|---|---|---|---|---|---|---|---|---|
| (United Kingdom) 1908 | The national team did not exist | | | | | | | | |
| (Sweden) 1912 | The national team did not exist | | | | | | | | |
| (Belgium) 1920 | The national team did not exist | | | | | | | | |
| (France) 1924 | Did not participate | | | | | | | | |
| (Netherlands) 1928 | Round of 16 | 14th | 2 | 0 | 0 | 2 | 2 | 10 | Squad |
| (Germany) 1936 | Did not participate | | | | | | | | |
| (United Kingdom) 1948 | Round of 16 | 11th | 1 | 0 | 0 | 1 | 3 | 5 | Squad |
| (Finland) 1952 | Did not qualify | | | | | | | | |
| (Australia) 1956 | Did not qualify | | | | | | | | |
| (Italy) 1960 | Did not qualify | | | | | | | | |
| (Japan) 1964 | The olympic team participated | | | | | | | | |
| (Mexico) 1968 | The olympic team participated | | | | | | | | |
| (West Germany) 1972 | The olympic team participated | | | | | | | | |
| (Canada) 1976 | The olympic team participated | | | | | | | | |
| (Soviet Union) 1980 | Did not qualify | | | | | | | | |
| (United States) 1984 | Did not qualify | | | | | | | | |
| (South Korea) 1988 | Banned | | | | | | | | |
| Since 1992 | The under-23 team participated | | | | | | | | |
| Total | Round of 16 | 2/13 | 3 | 0 | 0 | 3 | 5 | 15 | — |

=== Panamerican Championship ===
Panamerican Championship record
| Year | Round | Position | Pld | W | D | L | GF | GA | Squad |
|---|---|---|---|---|---|---|---|---|---|
| (Chile) 1952 | Round-robin | 5th | 5 | 1 | 0 | 4 | 5 | 14 | Squad |
| (Mexico) 1956 | Round-robin | 5th | 5 | 1 | 2 | 2 | 4 | 6 | Squad |
| (Costa Rica) 1960 | Third place | 3rd | 5 | 1 | 2 | 3 | 9 | 10 | Squad |
| Total | Third place | 3/3 | 16 | 3 | 4 | 9 | 18 | 30 | — |

=== NAFC Championship ===
NAFC Championship record
| Year | Round | Position | Pld | W | D* | L | GF | GA | Squad |
|---|---|---|---|---|---|---|---|---|---|
| (Cuba) 1947 | Champions | 1st | 2 | 2 | 0 | 0 | 8 | 1 | Squad |
| (Mexico) 1949 | Champions | 1st | 4 | 4 | 0 | 0 | 17 | 2 | Squad |
| Total | 2 Titles | 2/2 | 6 | 6 | 0 | 0 | 25 | 3 | — |

== Head-to-head record ==
As of 17 November 2026

Positive Record Neutral Record Negative Record

| Opponents | Pld | W | D | L | GF | GA | GD | Win % |
|---|---|---|---|---|---|---|---|---|
| Albania | 1 | 1 | 0 | 0 | 4 | 0 | +4 | 13 March 2002; 4-0 |
| Algeria | 2 | 1 | 1 | 0 | 4 | 2 | +2 | 13 October 2020; 2-2 |
| Angola | 2 | 1 | 1 | 0 | 1 | 0 | +1 | 13 May 2010; 1-0 |
| Argentina | 32 | 4 | 12 | 16 | 28 | 53 | -25 | 26 November 2022; 0-2 |
| Australia | 7 | 2 | 3 | 2 | 10 | 10 | 0 | 30 May 2026; 1-0 |
| Belarus | 1 | 0 | 0 | 1 | 2 | 3 | -1 | 18 November 2014; 2-3 |
| Belgium | 8 | 3 | 3 | 2 | 10 | 12 | -2 | 31 March 2026; 1-1 |
| Belize | 2 | 2 | 0 | 0 | 9 | 0 | +9 | 21 June 2008; 7-0 |
| Bermuda | 8 | 7 | 0 | 1 | 23 | 4 | +19 | 19 November 2019; 2-1 |
| Bolivia | 14 | 11 | 2 | 1 | 22 | 5 | +17 | 25 January 2026; 1-0 |
| Bosnia and Herzegovina | 4 | 3 | 0 | 1 | 5 | 2 | +3 | 31 January 2018; 1-0 |
| Brazil | 42 | 10 | 7 | 25 | 38 | 78 | -40 | 8 June 2024; 2–3 |
| Bulgaria | 13 | 4 | 6 | 3 | 16 | 14 | +2 | 16 November 2005; 0-3 |
| Cameroon | 3 | 2 | 1 | 0 | 4 | 2 | +2 | 10 June 2023; 2-2 |
| Canada | 40 | 25 | 11 | 4 | 89 | 26 | +63 | 20 March 2025; 2-0 |
| Chile | 34 | 15 | 6 | 13 | 37 | 44 | -7 | 6 October 2026; 0–2 |
| China | 3 | 3 | 0 | 0 | 7 | 2 | +5 | 16 April 2008; 1-0 |
| Colombia | 30 | 10 | 10 | 10 | 30 | 32 | –2 | 26 September 2026; 1-1 |
| Costa Rica | 59 | 32 | 21 | 6 | 88 | 34 | +54 | 22 June 2025; 0-0 |
| Croatia | 6 | 2 | 0 | 4 | 6 | 9 | -3 | 27 March 2018; 0-1 |
| Cuba | 13 | 13 | 0 | 0 | 51 | 6 | +45 | 15 June 2019; 7-0 |
| Curaçao | 1 | 1 | 0 | 0 | 2 | 0 | +2 | 16 July 2017; 2-0 |
| Czech Republic | 2 | 1 | 0 | 1 | 4 | 2 | +2 | 24 June 2026; 3–0 |
| DR Congo | 1 | 1 | 0 | 0 | 2 | 1 | +1 | 12 May 2006; 2-1 |
| Denmark | 4 | 1 | 1 | 2 | 5 | 6 | -1 | 9 June 2018; 0-2 |
| Dominica | 2 | 2 | 0 | 0 | 18 | 0 | +18 | 27 June 2004; 8-0 |
| Dominican Republic | 1 | 1 | 0 | 0 | 3 | 2 | +1 | 14 June 2025; 3–2 |
| Ecuador | 29 | 17 | 7 | 5 | 46 | 27 | +19 | 30 June 2026; 2–0 |
| Egypt | 4 | 2 | 1 | 1 | 8 | 4 | +4 | 27 July 1999; 2-2 |
| El Salvador | 37 | 32 | 1 | 4 | 106 | 20 | +86 | 30 March 2022; 2-0 |
| England | 11 | 2 | 1 | 8 | 6 | 30 | -24 | 5 July 2026; 2-3 |
| Estonia | 1 | 1 | 0 | 0 | 6 | 0 | +6 | 9 May 1998; 6-0 |
| Ethiopia | 1 | 1 | 0 | 0 | 3 | 0 | +3 | 29 September 1968; 3-0 |
| Fiji | 1 | 1 | 0 | 0 | 2 | 0 | +2 | 30 August 1980; 2-0 |
| Finland | 5 | 4 | 1 | 0 | 11 | 4 | +7 | 30 October 2013; 4-2 |
| France | 7 | 1 | 1 | 5 | 6 | 15 | -9 | 17 June 2010; 2-0 |
| Gambia | 1 | 1 | 0 | 0 | 5 | 1 | +4 | 30 May 2010; 5-1 |
| Germany | 13 | 2 | 6 | 5 | 13 | 26 | -13 | 17 October 2023; 2-2 |
| Ghana | 5 | 5 | 0 | 0 | 8 | 1 | +7 | 22 May 2026; 2-0 |
| Greece | 4 | 1 | 2 | 1 | 4 | 4 | 0 | 22 June 2005; 0-0 |
| Guadeloupe | 2 | 2 | 0 | 0 | 3 | 0 | +3 | 12 July 2009; 2-0 |
| Guatemala | 37 | 24 | 9 | 4 | 74 | 32 | +42 | 7 June 2023; 2-0 |
| Guinea | 1 | 0 | 0 | 0 | 4 | 0 | +4 | 17 October 1968; 4-0 |
| Guyana | 2 | 2 | 0 | 0 | 8 | 1 | +7 | 12 October 2012; 5-0 |
| Haiti | 11 | 9 | 2 | 0 | 30 | 3 | +27 | 29 June 2023; 3-1 |
| Honduras | 51 | 31 | 10 | 10 | 92 | 39 | +53 | 2 July 2025; 1–0 |
| Hungary | 7 | 5 | 1 | 1 | 15 | 6 | +9 | 14 December 2005; 2-0 |
| Iceland | 6 | 4 | 2 | 0 | 10 | 1 | +9 | 25 February 2026; 4–0 |
| Iran | 3 | 3 | 0 | 0 | 9 | 2 | +7 | 2 June 2007; 4-0 |
| Iraq | 2 | 2 | 0 | 0 | 5 | 0 | +5 | 9 November 2022; 4-0 |
| Israel | 2 | 1 | 0 | 1 | 3 | 1 | +2 | 28 May 2014; 3-0 |
| Italy | 12 | 1 | 4 | 7 | 10 | 28 | -18 | 16 June 2013; 1-2 |
| Ivory Coast | 1 | 1 | 0 | 0 | 4 | 1 | +3 | 14 August 2013; 4-1 |
| Jamaica | 31 | 22 | 5 | 4 | 75 | 18 | +57 | 17 November 2026 1-0 |
| Japan | 8 | 6 | 1 | 1 | 15 | 6 | +9 | 6 September 2025; 0–0 |
| Jordan | 1 | 0 | 1 | 0 | 0 | 0 | 0 | 18 October 1985; 0-0 |
| Kuwait | 1 | 0 | 1 | 0 | 0 | 0 | 0 | 25 October 1985; 0-0 |
| Liberia | 1 | 1 | 0 | 0 | 5 | 4 | +1 | 23 August 2001; 5-4 |
| Libya | 1 | 0 | 0 | 1 | 1 | 3 | -2 | 11 October 1985; 1-3 |
| Luxembourg | 1 | 0 | 0 | 1 | 1 | 2 | -1 | 10 April 1969; 1-2 |
| Martinique | 3 | 3 | 0 | 0 | 15 | 3 | +12 | 23 June 2019; 3-2 |
| Myanmar | 1 | 1 | 0 | 0 | 1 | 0 | +1 | 30 August 1972; 1-0 |
| Morocco | 1 | 0 | 0 | 1 | 1 | 2 | -1 | 11 September 1971; 1-2 |
| Netherlands | 9 | 4 | 1 | 4 | 16 | 15 | +1 | 7 October 2020; 1-0 |
| New Zealand | 8 | 7 | 0 | 1 | 21 | 9 | +12 | 7 September 2024; 3-0 |
| Nicaragua | 3 | 3 | 0 | 0 | 10 | 1 | +9 | 5 July 2009; 2-0 |
| Nigeria | 7 | 3 | 4 | 0 | 13 | 7 | +6 | 28 May 2022; 2-1 |
| North Korea | 1 | 1 | 0 | 0 | 2 | 1 | +1 | 17 March 2010; 2-1 |
| Northern Ireland | 2 | 1 | 0 | 1 | 4 | 4 | 0 | 11 June 1994; 3-0 |
| Norway | 6 | 3 | 1 | 2 | 11 | 8 | +3 | 25 January 2006; 2-1 |
| Panama | 29 | 21 | 6 | 2 | 52 | 16 | +36 | 22 January 2026; 1-0 |
| Paraguay | 22 | 11 | 5 | 6 | 38 | 19 | +19 | 18 November 2025; 1-2 |
| Peru | 29 | 13 | 7 | 9 | 39 | 33 | +6 | 29 September 2026; 1-1 |
| Poland | 9 | 3 | 3 | 3 | 13 | 9 | +4 | 22 November 2022; 0-0 |
| Portugal | 6 | 0 | 3 | 3 | 4 | 7 | -3 | 28 March 2026; 0-0 |
| Qatar | 1 | 0 | 0 | 1 | 0 | 1 | -1 | 2 July 2023; 0-1 |
| Republic of Ireland | 6 | 2 | 4 | 0 | 9 | 6 | +3 | 1 June 2017; 3-1 |
| Romania | 2 | 1 | 0 | 1 | 2 | 2 | 0 | 10 February 1993; 2-0 |
| Russia | 4 | 1 | 0 | 3 | 4 | 11 | -7 | 24 June 2017; 2-1 |
| Saint Kitts and Nevis | 2 | 2 | 0 | 0 | 13 | 0 | +13 | 17 November 2004; 8-0 |
| Saint Vincent and the Grenadines | 7 | 7 | 0 | 0 | 36 | 1 | +35 | 10 October 2004; 1-0 |
| Saudi Arabia | 7 | 6 | 1 | 0 | 18 | 3 | +15 | 28 June 2025; 2-0 |
| Scotland | 1 | 1 | 0 | 0 | 1 | 0 | +1 | 2 June 2018; 1-0 |
| Senegal | 2 | 2 | 0 | 0 | 3 | 0 | +3 | 10 February 2016; 2-0 |
| Serbia | 2 | 2 | 0 | 0 | 7 | 1 | +6 | 4 June 2026; 5-1 |
| Slovakia | 1 | 1 | 0 | 0 | 5 | 2 | +3 | 17 May 1996; 5-2 |
| Slovenia | 1 | 0 | 0 | 1 | 1 | 2 | -1 | 6 December 1995; 1-2 |
| South Africa | 5 | 3 | 1 | 1 | 12 | 5 | +7 | 11 June 2026; 2-0 |
| South Korea | 16 | 9 | 3 | 4 | 32 | 20 | +12 | 18 June 2026; 1–0 |
| Spain | 8 | 0 | 3 | 5 | 4 | 16 | -12 | 11 August 2010; 1-1 |
| Suriname | 4 | 4 | 0 | 0 | 15 | 1 | +14 | 18 June 2025; 2-0 |
| Sweden | 11 | 2 | 3 | 6 | 6 | 13 | -7 | 16 November 2022; 1-2 |
| Switzerland | 6 | 1 | 1 | 4 | 9 | 14 | -5 | 7 June 2025; 2-4 |
| Sudan | 1 | 1 | 0 | 0 | 1 | 0 | +1 | 28 August 1972; 1-0 |
| Tahiti | 1 | 1 | 0 | 0 | 1 | 0 | +1 | 2 September 1980; 1-0 |
| Trinidad and Tobago | 24 | 15 | 6 | 3 | 54 | 22 | +32 | 10 July 2021; 0-0 |
| Tunisia | 1 | 0 | 0 | 1 | 1 | 3 | -2 | 2 June 1978; 1-3 |
| Turkey | 1 | 1 | 0 | 0 | 1 | 0 | +1 | 10 June 2025; 1-0 |
| Ukraine | 1 | 1 | 0 | 0 | 2 | 1 | +1 | 20 October 1993; 2-1 |
| United Arab Emirates | 1 | 0 | 1 | 0 | 2 | 2 | 0 | 22 October 1985; 2-2 |
| United States | 80 | 38 | 17 | 25 | 149 | 96 | +53 | 3 October 2026; 0-3 |
| Uruguay | 24 | 8 | 8 | 8 | 29 | 35 | -6 | 15 November 2025; 0-0 |
| Uzbekistan | 1 | 0 | 1 | 0 | 3 | 3 | 0 | 12 September 2023; 3-3 |
| Venezuela | 14 | 10 | 3 | 1 | 30 | 11 | +19 | 26 June 2024; 0-1 |
| Wales | 5 | 2 | 2 | 1 | 5 | 3 | +2 | 27 March 2021; 0-1 |
| Yemen | 1 | 1 | 0 | 0 | 2 | 0 | +2 | 15 October 1985; 2-0 |
| Total | 1,004 | 537 | 222 | 245 | 1800 | 1033 | +767 | |

== Honours ==
=== Intercontinental ===
- FIFA Confederations Cup
  - Champions (1): 1999
  - (bronze) Third place (1): 1995
- Panamerican Championship (Note: Official competition organized by PFC, the former intercontinental and unified confederation of the Americas (1946–1961), which was formed by NAFC, CCCF and CONMEBOL.)
  - (bronze) Third place (1): 1960

=== Continental ===
- CONCACAF Championship / Gold Cup
  - Champions (13): 1965, 1971, 1977, 1993, 1996, 1998, 2003, 2009, 2011, 2015, 2019, 2023, 2025
  - (silver) Runners-up (3): 1967, 2007, 2021
  - (bronze) Third place (3): 1973, 1981, 1991
- CONCACAF Nations League
  - Champions (1): 2024–25
  - (silver) Runners-up (2): 2019–20, 2023–24
  - (bronze) Third place (1): 2022–23
- CONCACAF Cup
  - Champions (1): 2015
- CONMEBOL Copa América
  - (silver) Runners-up (2): 1993, 2001
  - (bronze) Third place (3): 1997, 1999, 2007

=== Subcontinental ===
- NAFC Championship (Note: Official competition organized by NAFC, the former subcontinental confederation affiliated with FIFA as the governing body of football in the North American Zone (1946–1961), and a direct predecessor of CONCACAF.)
  - (gold) Champions (2): 1947, 1949
- North American Nations Cup
  - (gold) Champions (1): 1991
  - (silver) Runners-up (1): 1990
- Central American and Caribbean Games
  - (gold) Gold medal (2): 1935, 1938

=== Friendly ===
- Torneo Internacional de Chile (1): 1966
- Copa Ciudad de México (1): 1975
- Azteca 2000 Tournament (1): 1985
- Marlboro Cup (1): 1989–IV
- U.S. Cup (3): 1996, 1997, 1999
- Lunar New Year Cup (1): 1999
- Copa Reebok (1): 1999

=== Summary ===
Including honours in competitions directly organized/recognized by FIFA or an affiliated confederation.

| Competition | 1st place, gold medalist(s) | 2nd place, silver medalist(s) | 3rd place, bronze medalist(s) | Total |
|---|---|---|---|---|
| FIFA Confederations Cup | 1 | 0 | 1 | 2 |
| CONCACAF Championship / Gold Cup | 13 | 3 | 3 | 18 |
| CONCACAF Nations League | 1 | 2 | 1 | 4 |
| CONCACAF Cup | 1 | 0 | 0 | 1 |
| CONMEBOL Copa América | 0 | 2 | 3 | 5 |
| Panamerican Championship | 0 | 0 | 1 | 1 |
| NAFC Championship | 2 | 0 | 0 | 2 |
| Total | 18 | 7 | 9 | 34 |

== See also ==
- Mexico national under-23 football team
- Mexico national under-21 football team
- Mexico national under-20 football team
- Mexico national under-17 football team
- Mexico women's national football team
- Mexico national beach football team
- Mexico national futsal team

== Notes ==
Achievements
| Preceded by 1997 Brazil | Confederations Cup Champions; 1999 (first title) | Succeeded by 2001 France |
| Preceded by 1963 Costa Rica | North American Champions; 1965 (first title) | Succeeded by 1967 Guatemala |
| Preceded by 1969 Costa Rica | North American Champions; 1971 (second title) | Succeeded by 1973 Haiti |
| Preceded by 1973 Haiti | North American Champions; 1977 (third title) | Succeeded by 1981 Honduras |
| Preceded by 1991 United States | North American Champions; 1993 (fourth title); 1996 (fifth title); 1998 (sixth title) | Succeeded by 2000 Canada |
| Preceded by 2002 United States | North American Champions; 2003 (seventh title) | Succeeded by 2005 United States |
| Preceded by 2007 United States | North American Champions; 2009 (eighth title); 2011 (ninth title) | Succeeded by 2013 United States |
| Preceded by 2013 United States | North American Champions; 2015 (tenth title) | Succeeded by 2017 United States |
| Preceded by 2017 United States | North American Champions; 2019 (eleventh title) | Succeeded by 2021 United States |
| Preceded by 2021 United States | North American Champions; 2023 (twelfth title) | Succeeded by Incumbent |
| Preceded by 2021 United States | Nations League Champions; 2024–25 (first title) | Succeeded by Incumbent |
| Preceded by 1990 Canada | North American Champions (CONCACAF era); 1991 (first title) | Succeeded by Defunct |
| Preceded by Inaugural | North American Champions (NAFC era); 1947 (first title); 1949 (second title) | Succeeded by Defunct |
