= 1950 FIFA World Cup final round =

The final round of the 1950 FIFA World Cup took place from 9 to 16 July 1950. The final round consisted of Brazil, Spain, Sweden, and Uruguay. The winners of the final round were declared winners of the World Cup.

Uruguay won the tournament, defeating hosts Brazil in the decisive match for their second World Cup title.

== Qualified teams ==
The top placed team from each of the four groups qualified for the final round.

Group	Winners
1	Brazil
2	Spain
3	Sweden
4	Uruguay

== Standings ==
Pos	Team	Pld	W	D	L	GF	GA	GD	Pts	Final result
1	Uruguay (C)	3	2	1	0	7	5	+2	5	Champions
2	Brazil	3	2	0	1	14	4	+10	4	Runners-up
3	Sweden	3	1	0	2	6	11	−5	2	Third place
4	Spain	3	0	1	2	4	11	−7	1	

Source: FIFA
Rules for classification: Tiebreakers
(C) Champions

== Matches ==
All times listed are local time.

=== Uruguay vs Spain ===
9 July 1950
15:00 BRT (UTC-3)

Uruguay	2–2	Spain
Ghiggia 29'; Varela 73'		Basora 37', 39'

Estádio do Pacaembu, São Paulo
Attendance: 44,802
Referee: Benjamin Griffiths (Wales)

Uruguay
Spain

GK	Roque Máspoli
DF	Eusebio Tejera
DF	Matías González
DF	Juan Carlos González
MF	Víctor Rodríguez Andrade
MF	Obdulio Varela (c)
FW	Alcides Ghiggia
FW	Julio Pérez
FW	Juan Alberto Schiaffino
FW	Oscar Míguez
FW	Ernesto Vidal
Manager:
Juan López

GK	Antoni Ramallets
DF	Gabriel Alonso
DF	José Parra
DF	Josep Gonzalvo
MF	Marià Gonzalvo
MF	Antonio Puchades
MF	Luis Molowny
FW	Estanislau Basora
FW	Agustín Gaínza (c)
FW	Silvestre Igoa
FW	Telmo Zarra
Manager:
Guillermo Eizaguirre

=== Brazil vs Sweden ===
9 July 1950
15:00 BRT (UTC-3)

Brazil	7–1	Sweden
Ademir 17', 36', 52', 58'; Chico 39', 88'; Maneca 85'		Andersson 67' (pen.)

Estádio do Maracanã, Rio de Janeiro
Attendance: 138,886
Referee: Arthur Ellis (England)

Brazil
Sweden

GK	Barbosa
RB	Augusto (c)
CH	Juvenal
LB	Bigode
RH	Bauer
LH	Danilo
OR	Maneca
IR	Zizinho
CF	Ademir
IL	Jair
OL	Chico
Manager:
Flávio Costa

GK	Kalle Svensson
RB	Lennart Samuelsson
CH	Knut Nordahl
LB	Erik Nilsson (c)
RH	Sune Andersson
LH	Ingvar Gärd
OR	Stig Sundqvist
IR	Karl-Erik Palmér
CF	Hasse Jeppson
IL	Lennart Skoglund
OL	Stellan Nilsson
Manager:
(England) George Raynor

=== Brazil vs Spain ===
13 July 1950
15:00 BRT (UTC-3)

Brazil	6–1	Spain
Ademir 15', 57'; Jair 21'; Chico 31', 55'; Zizinho 67'		Igoa 71'

Estádio do Maracanã, Rio de Janeiro
Attendance: 152,772
Referee: Reginald Leafe (England)

Brazil
Spain

GK	Barbosa
RB	Augusto (c)
LB	Juvenal
RH	Bauer
CH	Danilo
LH	Bigode
OR	Friaça
IR	Zizinho
CF	Ademir
IL	Jair
OL	Chico
Manager:
Flávio Costa

GK	Antoni Ramallets
CB	Gabriel Alonso
CB	José Parra
CB	Josep Gonzalvo
RH	Antonio Puchades
CH	Marià Gonzalvo
LH	José Luis Panizo
OR	Estanislau Basora
CF	Agustín Gaínza (c)
CF	Silvestre Igoa
OL	Telmo Zarra
Manager:
Guillermo Eizaguirre

=== Uruguay vs Sweden ===
13 July 1950
15:00 BRT (UTC-3)

Uruguay	3–2	Sweden
Ghiggia 39'; Míguez 77', 85'		Palmér 5'; Sundqvist 40'

Estádio do Pacaembu, São Paulo
Attendance: 7,987
Referee: Giovanni Galeati (Italy)

Uruguay
Sweden

GK	Aníbal Paz
RB	Matías González
LB	Eusebio Tejera
RH	Schubert Gambetta
CH	Obdulio Varela (c)
LH	Víctor Rodríguez Andrade
OR	Alcides Ghiggia
IR	Julio Pérez
CF	Oscar Míguez
IL	Juan Alberto Schiaffino
OL	Ernesto Vidal
Manager:
Juan López

GK	Kalle Svensson
RB	Erik Nilsson (c)
CB	Lennart Samuelsson
LB	Gunnar Johansson
RH	Sune Andersson
LH	Ingvar Gärd
OR	Hasse Jeppson
IR	Bror Mellberg
CF	Egon Jönsson
IL	Karl-Erik Palmér
OL	Stig Sundqvist
Manager:
(England) George Raynor

=== Sweden vs Spain ===
16 July 1950
15:00 BRT (UTC-3)

Sweden	3–1	Spain
Sundqvist 15'; Mellberg 33'; Palmér 80'		Zarra 82'

Estádio do Pacaembu, São Paulo
Attendance: 11,227
Referee: Karel van der Meer (Netherlands)

Sweden
Spain

GK	Kalle Svensson
DF	Erik Nilsson (c)
DF	Lennart Samuelsson
DF	Gunnar Johansson
MF	Sune Andersson
MF	Ingvar Gärd
FW	Bror Mellberg
FW	Egon Jönsson
FW	Ingvar Rydell
FW	Karl-Erik Palmér
FW	Stig Sundqvist
Manager:
(England) George Raynor

GK	Ignacio Eizaguirre
DF	Gabriel Alonso
DF	José Parra
DF	Vicente Asensi
MF	Alfonso Silva
MF	Antonio Puchades
MF	José Luis Panizo
FW	Estanislau Basora
FW	Rosendo Hernández
FW	José Juncosa
FW	Telmo Zarra (c)
Manager:
Guillermo Eizaguirre

=== Uruguay vs Brazil ===
16 July 1950
15:00 BRT (UTC-3)

Uruguay	2–1	Brazil
Schiaffino 66'; Ghiggia 79'		Friaça 47'

Estádio do Maracanã, Rio de Janeiro
Attendance: 173,850
Referee: George Reader (England)

Uruguay	Brazil

GK	1	Roque Máspoli
RB	2	Matías González
LB	3	Eusebio Tejera
RH	4	Schubert Gambetta
CH	5	Obdulio Varela (c)
LH	6	Víctor Rodríguez Andrade
OR	7	Alcides Ghiggia
IR	8	Julio Pérez
CF	9	Óscar Míguez
IL	10	Juan Alberto Schiaffino
OL	11	Rubén Morán
Manager:
Juan López Fontana

GK	1	Moacir Barbosa
RB	2	Augusto (c)
LB	3	Juvenal
RH	4	Bauer
CH	5	Danilo
LH	6	Bigode
OR	7	Friaça
IR	8	Zizinho
CF	9	Ademir
IL	10	Jair
OL	11	Chico
Manager:
Flávio Costa

Assistant referees:
Arthur Edward Ellis (England)
George Mitchell (Scotland)

== See also ==
- Brazil at the FIFA World Cup
- Spain at the FIFA World Cup
- Sweden at the FIFA World Cup
- Uruguay at the FIFA World Cup
