= 1952 Panamerican Championship squads =

These are the squads for the countries that played in the 1952 Panamerican Championship.

The age listed for each player is on 16 March 1952, the first day of the tournament. The numbers of caps and goals listed for each player do not include any matches played after the start of the tournament. The club listed is the club for which the player last played a competitive match before the tournament. The nationality for each club reflects the national association (not the league) to which the club is affiliated. A flag is included for coaches who are of a different nationality than their own national team.

Peru had one player represent a foreign club.

== Brazil ==
Head coach: Zezé Moreira

No.	Pos.	Player	Date of birth (age)	Caps	Goals	Club
-	GK	Cabeção	23 August 1930 (aged 21)	0	0	(Brazilian Football Confederation) Corinthians
-	GK	Castilho	27 November 1927 (aged 24)	3	0	(Brazilian Football Confederation) Fluminense
-	GK	Oswaldo Baliza	9 October 1923 (aged 28)	1	0	(Brazilian Football Confederation) Botafogo
-	DF	Pinheiro	13 January 1932 (aged 20)	0	0	(Brazilian Football Confederation) Fluminense
-	DF	Djalma Santos	27 February 1929 (aged 23)	0	0	(Brazilian Football Confederation) Portuguesa
-	DF	Arati	3 April 1923 (aged 28)	0	0	(Brazilian Football Confederation) Botafogo
-	DF	Brandãozinho	9 June 1925 (aged 26)	0	0	(Brazilian Football Confederation) Portuguesa
-	DF	Nílton Santos	16 May 1925 (aged 26)	5	0	(Brazilian Football Confederation) Botafogo
-	DF	Ruarinho	10 November 1928 (aged 23)	0	0	(Brazilian Football Confederation) Botafogo
-	MF	Bauer	21 November 1925 (aged 26)	11	0	(Brazilian Football Confederation) São Paulo
-	MF	Rubens	4 November 1928 (aged 23)	0	0	(Brazilian Football Confederation) Flamengo
-	MF	Bigode	4 April 1922 (aged 29)	5	0	(Brazilian Football Confederation) Fluminense
-	MF	Didi	8 October 1928 (aged 23)	0	0	(Brazilian Football Confederation) Fluminense
-	MF	Gérson dos Santos	14 July 1922 (aged 29)	0	0	(Brazilian Football Confederation) Botafogo
-	MF	Ely	14 May 1921 (aged 30)	9	0	(Brazilian Football Confederation) Vasco da Gama
-	FW	Friaça	20 October 1924 (aged 27)	10	1	(Brazilian Football Confederation) São Paulo
-	FW	Ademir de Menezes	6 November 1922 (aged 29)	31	29	(Brazilian Football Confederation) Vasco da Gama
-	FW	Baltazar	14 January 1926 (aged 26)	6	2	(Brazilian Football Confederation) Corinthians
-	FW	Rodrigues	27 June 1925 (aged 26)	2	0	(Brazilian Football Confederation) Palmeiras
-	FW	Ipojucan	3 June 1926 (aged 25)	0	0	(Brazilian Football Confederation) Portuguesa
-	FW	Pinga	11 February 1924 (aged 28)	2	3	(Brazilian Football Confederation) Portuguesa
-	FW	Julinho Botelho	29 July 1929 (aged 22)	0	0	(Brazilian Football Confederation) Portuguesa
-	FW	Nívio Gabrich	7 September 1927 (aged 24)	0	0	(Brazilian Football Confederation) Bangu

== Chile ==
Head coach: Luis Tirado

No.	Pos.	Player	Date of birth (age)	Caps	Goals	Club
-	GK	Sergio Livingstone	26 March 1920 (aged 31)	32	0	(Football Federation of Chile) Universidad Católica
-	GK	Hernán Fernández	17 March 1921 (aged 30)	8	0	(Football Federation of Chile) Unión Española
-	DF	Arturo Farías captain	1 September 1927 (aged 24)	6	0	(Football Federation of Chile) Colo-Colo
-	DF	Fernando Roldán	15 October 1921 (aged 30)	2	0	(Football Federation of Chile) Universidad Católica
-	DF	Fernando Wirth		0	0	(Football Federation of Chile) Santiago Morning
-	DF	José Campos		0	0	(Football Federation of Chile) Santiago Morning
-	DF	Juan Negri	5 January 1925 (aged 27)	15	0	(Football Federation of Chile) Universidad de Chile
-	DF	Adelmo Yori	5 March 1928 (aged 24)	1	0	(Football Federation of Chile) Audax Italiano
-	MF	Osvaldo Sáez	13 August 1923 (aged 28)	11	3	(Football Federation of Chile) Santiago Wanderers
-	FW	Carlos Rojas	2 October 1928 (aged 23)	7	1	(Football Federation of Chile) Unión Española
-	MF	Ramiro Cortés	27 April 1931 (aged 20)	0	0	(Football Federation of Chile) Audax Italiano
-	MF	Enrique Hormazábal	6 January 1931 (aged 21)	3	0	(Football Federation of Chile) Santiago Morning
-	MF	Hernán Carvallo	19 August 1922 (aged 29)	7	0	(Football Federation of Chile) Universidad Católica
-	FW	René Meléndez	29 December 1928 (aged 23)	2	0	(Football Federation of Chile) Everton
-	FW	Atilio Cremaschi	8 March 1923 (aged 29)	14	7	(Football Federation of Chile) Unión Española
-	FW	Manuel Muñoz	28 April 1928 (aged 23)	2	0	(Football Federation of Chile) Colo-Colo
-	FW	Andrés Prieto	19 December 1928 (aged 23)	10	2	(Football Federation of Chile) Universidad Católica
-	MF	Carlos Tello	28 March 1928 (aged 23)	0	0	(Football Federation of Chile) Audax Italiano
—	FW	Guillermo Díaz	29 December 1930 (aged 21)	0	0	(Football Federation of Chile) Santiago Morning
—	FW	Óscar Carrasco	14 August 1928 (aged 23)	0	0	(Football Federation of Chile) Audax Italiano
—	FW	Pedro López	25 October 1927 (aged 24)	14	5	(Football Federation of Chile) Unión Española
—	FW	Mario Lorca	25 December 1929 (aged 22)	2	0	(Football Federation of Chile) Unión Española

== Mexico ==
Head coach: (Spain) Antonio López Herranz

No.	Pos.	Player	Date of birth (age)	Caps	Goals	Club
-	GK	Antonio Carbajal	7 June 1929 (aged 22)	3	0	(Mexican Football Federation) León
-	GK	Raúl Córdoba	13 March 1924 (aged 28)	2	0	(Mexican Football Federation) San Sebastián
-	DF	Raúl Varela	29 June 1922 (aged 29)	1	0	(Mexican Football Federation) León
-	DF	Antonio Battaglia	19 September 1918 (aged 33)	0	0	(Mexican Football Federation) León
-	DF	Alfonso Montemayor	28 April 1922 (aged 29)	4	0	(Mexican Football Federation) León
-	DF	José Antonio Roca	24 May 1928 (aged 23)	6	0	(Mexican Football Federation) Necaxa
-	DF	Sergio Bravo	27 November 1927 (aged 24)	2	0	(Mexican Football Federation) León
-	MF	Carlos Blanco	5 March 1927 (aged 25)	0	0	(Mexican Football Federation) Necaxa
-	MF	Saturnino Martínez	1 January 1928 (aged 24)	0	0	(Mexican Football Federation) León
-	MF	Alfredo Costa	12 April 1921 (aged 30)	0	0	(Mexican Football Federation) León
-	MF	José Luis Molina Porras	19 March 1931 (aged 20)	0	0	(Mexican Football Federation) León
-	MF	Rafael Rivera	24 October 1925 (aged 26)	0	0	(Mexican Football Federation) Guadalajara
-	FW	José Luis Lamadrid	3 July 1930 (aged 21)	0	0	(Mexican Football Federation) Necaxa
-	FW	José Naranjo	19 March 1926 (aged 25)	2	2	(Mexican Football Federation) Oro
-	FW	Adalberto López	4 July 1923 (aged 28)	2	4	(Mexican Football Federation) León
-	FW	Tomás Balcázar	21 December 1931 (aged 20)	0	0	(Mexican Football Federation) Guadalajara
-	FW	Carlos Septién	18 January 1923 (aged 29)	7	2	(Mexican Football Federation) Tampico
-	FW	Luis Luna Barragán	10 January 1928 (aged 24)	2	2	(Mexican Football Federation) León
-	FW	Guillermo García Vélez		0	0	(Mexican Football Federation) Necaxa

== Panama ==
Head coach: Óscar Rendoll Gómez

No.	Pos.	Player	Date of birth (age)	Caps	Goals	Club
	GK	Everardo Lasso		1	0	(Panamanian Football Federation) Ancón
	GK	Gerardo Federico Warren		9	0	(Panamanian Football Federation) Hispano
	GK	Alejandro Casanova		0	0	(Panamanian Football Federation) Doma Colón
	DF	Carlos Lanús Pérez		2	0	(Panamanian Football Federation) San Francisco
	DF	Reinaldo Carrillo		13	0	(Panamanian Football Federation) Hispano
	DF	Félix Tejada		16	2	(Panamanian Football Federation) Ancón
	DF	Gastón de León		3	0	(Panamanian Football Federation) San Francisco
	DF	Manuel Figueroa		4	1	(Panamanian Football Federation) San Francisco
	MF	Alfredo Sandiford		10	0	(Panamanian Football Federation) San Francisco
	MF	José "Ñato" Mendoza		0	0	(Panamanian Football Federation) San Francisco
	MF	Carlos "Negro" Martínez		1	0	(Panamanian Football Federation) Ancón
	MF	Víctor Reyes		0	0	(Panamanian Football Federation) San José Chiriqui
	MF	Nelson Castillo		1	0	(Panamanian Football Federation) Doma Colón
	MF	Venancio Miranda		0	0	(Panamanian Football Federation) San José Chiriqui
	MF	Santiago Jordán		0	0	(Panamanian Football Federation) Ancón
	FW	Horacio Rangel		4	1	(Panamanian Football Federation) San Francisco
	FW	José Félix de Bello		5	2	(Panamanian Football Federation) San Francisco
	FW	Roberto Linares		1	0	(Panamanian Football Federation) San Francisco
	FW	José Cabrera		0	0	(Panamanian Football Federation) Doma Colón
	FW	Antonio Carlos Torres		0	0	(Panamanian Football Federation) Ancón
	FW	Luis Carlos Rangel		17	15	(Panamanian Football Federation) Ancón
	FW	Carlos Quintero		0	0	(Panamanian Football Federation) Centurias Colón

== Peru ==
Head coach: Alfonso Huapaya

No.	Pos.	Player	Date of birth (age)	Caps	Goals	Club
—	GK	Walter Ormeño	3 December 1926 (aged 25)	7	0	(Argentine Football Association) Boca Juniors
—	GK	Clemente Velásquez	13 November 1927 (aged 24)	0	0	(Peruvian Football Federation) Sport Boys
—	DF	Guillermo Delgado	11 February 1931 (aged 21)	0	0	(Peruvian Football Federation) Alianza Lima
—	DF	Diego Agurto	13 November 1927 (aged 24)	0	0	(Peruvian Football Federation) Sport Boys
—	DF	Lorenzo Pacheco	10 August 1919 (aged 32)	8	0	(Peruvian Football Federation) Sport Boys
—	DF	Adolfo Cabada	1920 (aged 31–32)	0	0	(Peruvian Football Federation) Deportivo Municipal
—	DF	César Brush	4 April 1930 (aged 21)	0	0	(Peruvian Football Federation) Deportivo Municipal
-	MF	Carlos Lazón	5 October 1929 (aged 22)	0	0	(Peruvian Football Federation) Mariscal Sucre
—	MF	Dagoberto Lavalle	25 March 1925 (aged 26)	2	0	(Peruvian Football Federation) Sport Boys
—	MF	Cornelio Heredia	16 October 1920 (aged 31)	10	1	(Peruvian Football Federation) Alianza Lima
—	MF	Luis Calderón	17 June 1929 (aged 22)	0	0	(Peruvian Football Federation) Sport Boys
—	MF	Gilberto Torres	15 August 1928 (aged 23)	0	0	(Peruvian Football Federation) Universitario de Deportes
—	MF	René Rosasco	29 October 1924 (aged 27)	2	0	(Peruvian Football Federation) Atlético Chalaco
—	MF	Rafael Goyeneche		0	0	(Peruvian Football Federation) Sporting Tabaco
-	FW	Roberto Drago	28 July 1923 (aged 28)	5	3	(Peruvian Football Federation) Deportivo Municipal
—	FW	Valeriano López	4 May 1926 (aged 25)	6	2	(Peruvian Football Federation) Sport Boys
-	FW	Guillermo Barbadillo	9 January 1925 (aged 27)	4	0	(Peruvian Football Federation) Alianza Lima
—	FW	Manuel Rivera	15 May 1922 (aged 29)	0	0	(Peruvian Football Federation) Deportivo Municipal
-	FW	Máximo Mosquera	8 January 1928 (aged 24)	6	2	(Peruvian Football Federation) Deportivo Municipal
—	FW	Ernesto Morales	17 May 1925 (aged 26)	2	0	(Peruvian Football Federation) Atlético Chalaco
-	FW	Roberto Castillo	29 April 1930 (aged 21)	0	0	(Peruvian Football Federation) Alianza Lima
-	FW	Augusto Alvarado	24 August 1926 (aged 25)	0	0	(Peruvian Football Federation) Deportivo Municipal

== Uruguay ==
Head coach: Juan Óopez

No.	Pos.	Player	Date of birth (age)	Caps	Goals	Club
-	GK	Roque Máspoli	12 October 1917 (aged 34)	14	0	(Uruguayan Football Association) Peñarol
—	GK	Luis Radiche	8 October 1927 (aged 24)	0	0	(Uruguayan Football Association) River Plate
—	DF	Matías González	6 August 1925 (aged 26)	11	0	(Uruguayan Football Association) Cerro
—	DF	José Santamaría	31 July 1929 (aged 22)	0	0	(Uruguayan Football Association) Nacional
-	DF	Héctor Vilches	14 February 1926 (aged 26)	0	0	(Uruguayan Football Association) Cerro
-	MF	Víctor Rodríguez Andrade	2 May 1927 (aged 24)	2	0	(Uruguayan Football Association) Central Español
-	MF	Juan Carlos González	22 August 1924 (aged 27)	6	0	(Uruguayan Football Association) Peñarol
-	MF	Obdulio Varela (captain)	20 September 1917 (aged 34)	29	6	(Uruguayan Football Association) Peñarol
—	MF	Schubert Gambetta	14 April 1920 (aged 31)	27	3	(Uruguayan Football Association) Nacional
—	MF	Ubire Durán	21 June 1920 (aged 31)	5	0	(Uruguayan Football Association) Nacional
—	MF	Walter Loureiro		0	0	(Uruguayan Football Association) River Plate
—	MF	Omar Ferreira		0	0	(Uruguayan Football Association) Sud América
-	FW	Alcides Ghiggia	22 December 1926 (aged 25)	4	4	(Uruguayan Football Association) Peñarol
-	FW	Julio César Britos	18 May 1926 (aged 25)	1	1	(Uruguayan Football Association) Peñarol
-	FW	Julio Pérez	19 June 1926 (aged 25)	4	1	(Uruguayan Football Association) Nacional
-	FW	Javier Ambrois	9 May 1932 (aged 19)	0	0	(Uruguayan Football Association) Nacional
-	FW	Oscar Míguez	5 December 1927 (aged 24)	4	5	(Uruguayan Football Association) Peñarol
-	FW	Nelson Cancela	21 June 1920 (aged 31)	0	0	(Uruguayan Football Association) Cerro
-	FW	Ernesto Vidal	15 November 1921 (aged 30)	3	1	(Uruguayan Football Association) Peñarol
-	FW	Julio Abbadie	7 September 1930 (aged 21)	0	0	(Uruguayan Football Association) Peñarol
-	FW	Osvaldo Balseiro	8 August 1928 (aged 23)	0	0	(Uruguayan Football Association) Defensor Sporting
-	FW	Ramón Ferrez	6 June 1921 (aged 30)	0	0	(Uruguayan Football Association) Defensor Sporting
