= 1950 FIFA World Cup Group 4 =

Football tournament group stage

Group 4 of the 1950 FIFA World Cup took place on 2 July 1950. The group consisted of Uruguay, France, and Bolivia. However, France later withdrew from the group. The group winners advanced to the final round.

== Standings ==
Pos	Team	Pld	W	D	L	GF	GA	GD	Pts	Qualification
1	Uruguay	1	1	0	0	8	0	+8	2	Advance to final round
2	Bolivia	1	0	0	1	0	8	−8	0	
3	France	0	0	0	0	0	0	0	0	Withdrew

Source: FIFA
Rules for classification: Tiebreakers

== Matches ==
All times listed are local time.

=== Uruguay vs Bolivia ===
2 July 1950
15:00 BRT (UTC-3)

Uruguay	8–0	Bolivia
Míguez 14', 40', 51'; Vidal 18'; Schiaffino 23', 54'; Pérez 83'; Ghiggia 87'

Estádio Independência, Belo Horizonte
Attendance: 5,284
Referee: George Reader (England)

Uruguay
Bolivia

GK	Roque Máspoli
RB	Matías González
LB	Eusebio Tejera
RH	Juan Carlos González
CH	Obdulio Varela (c)
LH	Víctor Rodríguez Andrade
OR	Alcides Ghiggia
IR	Julio Pérez
CF	Óscar Míguez
IL	Juan Alberto Schiaffino
OL	Ernesto Vidal
Manager:
Juan López Fontana

GK	Eduardo Gutiérrez
RB	Alberto Achá
CB	José Bustamante (c)
LB	Antonio Greco
RH	Antonio Valencia
LH	Leonardo Ferrel
OR	Celestino Algarañaz
IR	Víctor Ugarte
CF	Roberto Capparelli
IL	Benigno Gutiérrez
OL	Benjamin Maldonado
Manager:
(Italy) Mario Pretto

== See also ==
- Bolivia at the FIFA World Cup
- Uruguay at the FIFA World Cup
