= Uruguay v Brazil (1950 FIFA World Cup) =

World Cup final in Brazil

The Maracanã Smash (O Maracanaço) (El Maracanazo)
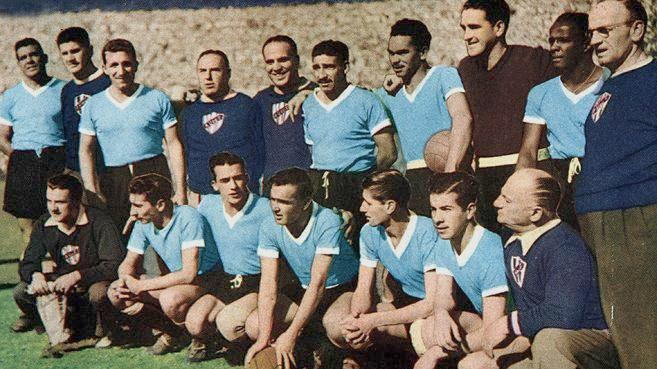
- Uruguay team
- Event: 1950 FIFA World Cup
Uruguay	Brazil
2	1
- Date: 16 July 1950
- Venue: Maracanã, Rio de Janeiro
- Referee: George Reader (England)
- Attendance: 173,850

The match between Uruguay and Brazil was the decisive match of the final stage at the 1950 FIFA World Cup. It was played at the Maracanã Stadium in the then-capital of Brazil, Rio de Janeiro, on 16 July 1950.

Uniquely to this World Cup, as all other editions have concluded with a one-off final, the winner was the team with the most points after round-robin games between the top four teams. Going into the final round, second-placed Uruguay needed to beat Brazil, while Brazil, leading by a point, could get away with a draw. Thus, their matchup is often regarded as the de facto final.

Soon into the second half, Friaça scored Brazil's first goal. Juan Alberto Schiaffino equalised some time later, and with eleven minutes remaining, Alcides Ghiggia put Uruguay ahead. Brazil was unable to score one more goal, and so, Uruguay won 2–1, hoisting the Jules Rimet Trophy for the second time.

A victory of an underdog over a heavily favoured side, the result is considered one of the biggest upsets in the history of football. The term Maracanaço (in Portuguese) or Maracanazo (in Spanish), roughly translated as "The Maracanã Smash", became synonymous with the match.

Spectated officially by 173,850 people and possibly by over 200,000, the Maracanazo may have been the most highly attended football match ever played, challenged only by the 1923 FA Cup final.

The last survivor of the game was Uruguay's Alcides Ghiggia, who died on 16 July 2015 at the age of 88.

== Background ==
Standings before the final match
Team	Pld	W	D	L	GF	GA	Pts
Brazil	2	2	0	0	13	2	4
Uruguay	2	1	1	0	5	4	3
Spain	2	0	1	1	3	8	1
Sweden	2	0	0	2	3	10	0

Brazil's games before deciding match
	Opponent	Result
1	Mexico	4–0
2	Switzerland	2–2
3	Yugoslavia	2–0
F1	Sweden	7–1
F2	Spain	6–1

Uruguay's games before deciding match
	Opponent	Result
1	Bolivia	8–0
F1	Spain	2–2
F2	Sweden	3–2

The road to the title in the 1950 World Cup was unique; instead of a knockout stage, the preliminary group stage was followed by another round-robin group. Of the 16 teams slated to compete, only 13 arrived. The final four teams were Brazil (the host country and joint-top scorers from the group stage, coming from wins over Mexico and Yugoslavia and a draw against Switzerland), Uruguay (who only had to play one match in their group, an 8–0 win over Bolivia), Spain (who won all three of their group matches, against England, Chile, and the United States), and Sweden (who qualified ahead of Paraguay and the defending world champions, Italy).

Brazil won both of their first two matches convincingly, beating Sweden 7–1 and Spain 6–1 to go top of the group with four points going into the final match. With three points, Uruguay were close behind in second place, although they had to come back from 2–1 down to draw 2–2 with Spain and beat Sweden 3–2, the winning goal coming just five minutes before the end of the game. The match between Brazil and Uruguay, on the other hand, would decide the title; a victory or a draw would grant Brazil the title, whereas Uruguay had to win the match in order to win the championship. Brazil had scored 21 goals in five games before the match with Uruguay and had defeated both Spain and Sweden with larger margins than the Uruguayans had. As a result, Brazil was extremely confident of victory in the deciding match, and newspapers and politicians declared victory before the game even began.

The 1950 FIFA World Cup was the only version of the tournament to be played with a round-robin final round; as such, is the only FIFA World Cup to date to not have a deciding knock-out final. However, as the result of the match directly determined the champions, the match has come to be commonly referred to as the final, even by FIFA itself.

== Anticipated celebration ==
The specialised press and the general public were so confident of victory, based on Brazil's almost indomitable form, that they had already started declaring Brazil the new world champions for days prior to the match. Newspapers such as the Gazeta Esportiva in São Paulo and O Mundo in Rio de Janeiro proclaimed victory the day before the game. Brazil had won their last two matches (Spain and Sweden) with a very successful attack-minded style of play. Uruguay, however, had encountered difficulties, managing only a draw against Spain and narrow victory over Sweden. The comparison of those results seemed to show that the Brazilians were set to defeat Uruguay as easily as they had defeated Spain and Sweden.

Moreover, in the Copa América, also held in Brazil the previous year, the hosts had won by scoring 46 goals in just eight matches. Ecuador was beaten 9–1, Bolivia 10–1, and runners-up Paraguay were defeated with a margin of 7–0. Further, Brazil beat Uruguay 5–1.

The mayor of Rio, Ângelo Mendes de Moraes, delivered a speech on the day of the game with the words: "You, players, who in less than a few hours will be hailed as champions by millions of compatriots! You, who have no rivals in the entire hemisphere! You, who will overcome any other competitor! You, who I already salute as victors!" A victory song, "Brasil Os Vencedores" ("Brazil the Victors"), was composed and practised, ready to be played after the final.

However, Paulo Machado de Carvalho, then a São Paulo FC leader, but later head of the Brazilian squad that won the World Cups of 1958 and 1962, opposed such premature claims of victory. During a visit to the training session at the Estádio São Januário on the eve of the game, Paulo found several politicians making impassioned speeches to the players, as well as journalists, photographers, and others arriving to join the "future champions". When he warned coach Flávio Costa about the risk of upsetting the players' concentration, Paulo was ignored. Frustrated, he told his son Tuta, who was with him, "we are going to lose".

On the morning of 16 July 1950, the streets of Rio de Janeiro were bustling with activity. An improvised carnival was organised, with thousands of signs celebrating the world title, and chants of "Brazil must win!". This spirit was maintained until the final minutes of the match. The officially recorded crowd of 173,850 people at the Maracanã Stadium is an all-time high in terms of number of paid spectators for a football game; the actual attendance, including the thousands who entered the stadium illegally, amounted to up to 220,000 by some estimates, and may only have been surpassed by that of the 1923 FA Cup final in England, which anywhere between 150,000 and over 300,000 people are believed to have attended. Those figures are unlikely to be approached in an era when practically all high-profile matches are held in all-seater stadiums; until its first great remodelling in 1999, the Maracanã was mostly concrete grandstands with no seats.

== Uruguay's preparation ==
The Brazilian newspaper O Mundo printed an early edition on the day of the final containing a photograph of Brazil with the caption "These are the world champions". Disgusted with the premature assumption, Uruguay's captain, Obdulio Varela, bought as many copies as he could, laid them on his bathroom floor and encouraged his teammates to spit and urinate on them.

In the moments prior to the match, coach Juan López informed his team in Uruguay's dressing room that their best chance of surviving the powerful offensive line of Brazil would come through adopting a defensive strategy. After he left, Varela stood up and addressed the team himself, saying "Juancito is a good man, but today, he is wrong. If we play defensively against Brazil, our fate will be no different from Spain or Sweden." Varela then delivered an emotional speech about how they should go against all odds and not be intimidated by the fans or the opposing team. The speech, as was later confirmed, played a huge part in the outcome of the game. In response to his squad's underdog status, the captain delivered the memorable line, "Muchachos, los de afuera son de palo. Que comience la función." ("Boys, outsiders are just stickdolls. Let's start the show." or "Outsiders don't play. Let the show begin.")

== Match ==
=== Summary ===
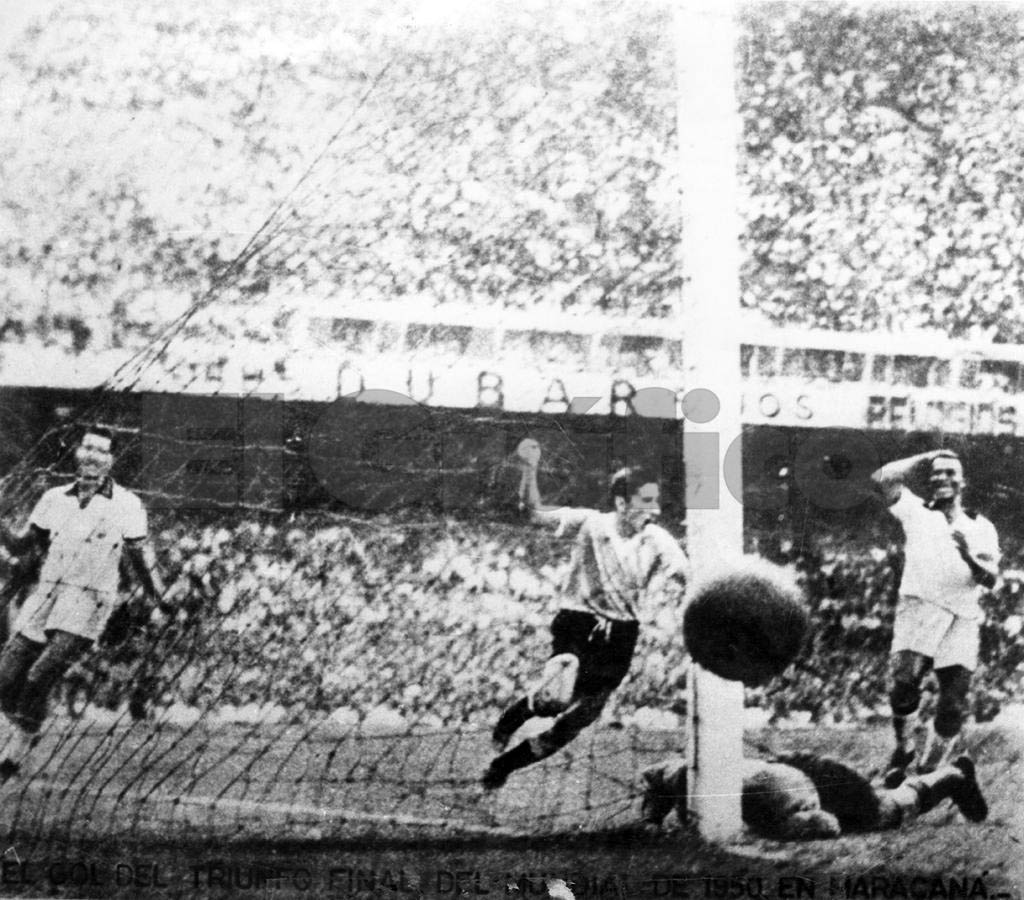
Alcides Ghiggia celebrates after scoring the 2nd goal.

The game began as predicted, with Brazil attacking against the Uruguayan defensive line for the majority of the first half. Unlike Spain and Sweden, however, the Uruguayans managed to maintain their defence and the first half ended scoreless. Brazil scored the first goal of the match only two minutes after the interval, with São Paulo forward Friaça shooting low past goalkeeper Roque Máspoli. After the goal, Varela took the ball and disputed the validity of the goal to the referee, arguing that Friaça was offside. Varela drew out this argument, going so far as to demand that the referee listen to him through an interpreter. By the time the conversation ended, the crowd had calmed down. Then, Varela took the ball to the center of the field, and shouted to his team, "Now, it's time to win!"

Uruguay managed to take control of the game. When faced with a capable Uruguayan attack, Brazil showed their frail defense, and Juan Alberto Schiaffino scored the equaliser in the 66th minute. Later, Alcides Ghiggia, running down the right side of the field, scored another goal, with a low shot that went just under goalkeeper Moacir Barbosa (who, having anticipated a cross from Ghiggia's position, dived a moment too late to stop the ball from rolling under him), with only 11 minutes remaining on the clock. The crowd went virtually silent after the second Uruguayan goal until English referee George Reader signalled the end of the match, with the final score being 2–1 to Uruguay.

=== Details ===
16 July 1950
15:00 BRT (UTC-3)

Uruguay	2–1	Brazil
Schiaffino 66'; Ghiggia 79'		Friaça 47'

Estádio do Maracanã, Rio de Janeiro
Attendance: 173,850
Referee: George Reader (England)

Uruguay	Brazil

GK	1	Roque Máspoli
RB	2	Matías González
LB	3	Eusebio Tejera
RH	4	Schubert Gambetta
CH	5	Obdulio Varela (c)
LH	6	Víctor Rodríguez Andrade
OR	7	Alcides Ghiggia
IR	8	Julio Pérez
CF	9	Óscar Míguez
IL	10	Juan Alberto Schiaffino
OL	11	Rubén Morán
Manager:
Juan López Fontana

GK	1	Moacir Barbosa
RB	2	Augusto (c)
LB	3	Juvenal
RH	4	Bauer
CH	5	Danilo
LH	6	Bigode
OR	7	Friaça
IR	8	Zizinho
CF	9	Ademir
IL	10	Jair
OL	11	Chico
Manager:
Flávio Costa

Assistant referees:
Arthur Edward Ellis (England)
George Mitchell (Scotland)

Match rules

- 90 minutes
- No substitutions permitted

== Aftermath ==
Final standings
Team	Pld	W	D	L	GF	GA	Pts
Uruguay	3	2	1	0	7	5	5
Brazil	3	2	0	1	14	4	4
Sweden	3	1	0	2	6	11	2
Spain	3	0	1	2	4	11	1

When the match ended, the stadium was filled with "disturbing and traumatic absolute silence," and famous radio journalist Ary Barroso (briefly) retired after the match. A group of Brazilian fans started a fight with Uruguayans in a hotel lobby, and eight Uruguayans died as a result of celebrations in Uruguay. However, the players and most Brazilian fans behaved well in defeat; the Uruguayan newspaper El Dia declared Brazil "the other winner" and said "if before the match we respected the Brazilian sporting power, after the encounter our respect grew and we even more profoundly admired the great spirit demonstrated by the Brazilians in adversity."

Four members of the 1950 team—the captain Augusto, Juvenal, Bigode and Chico—never played for Brazil again. Two unused squad members of the 1950 team, Nílton Santos and Carlos Castilho, were also members of the victorious Brazil squads that were to come, when Brazil won back-to-back World Cups in 1958 and 1962. Santos played in both finals whereas Castilho only played in the 1954 FIFA World Cup and in 2007 was posthumously awarded the 1958 and 1962 winning medals as a squad member, having been Gilmar's reserve in both tournaments.

Shortly before the 1954 FIFA World Cup, Brazil changed their kit to a yellow shirt with green trim, blue shorts and white socks, the colours of the national flag.

Brazil's white shirts with blue collars that were worn in the final game were, in the wake of the defeat, subject to criticism by the country's sports federation for being "unpatriotic", with pressure mounting to change the colours. In 1953 and with the support of the Brazilian Sports Confederation, a competition was held by the newspaper Correio da Manhã to design a new outfit, with the rule being that it must incorporate the colours of the national flag. Eventually, the competition was won by newspaper illustrator Aldyr Garcia Schlee, who came up with the design of a yellow shirt with a green trim, blue shorts with white trim, and white socks. Schlee had initially been deterred from using all four colours, believing that yellow and white was too similar to the Holy See.

The new kit was first used in March 1954 against Chile, and has been used ever since. The runner-up design was a green shirt, white shorts, and yellow socks. When Brazil first won the World Cup in 1958, they wore an improvised blue kit as the new colours clashed with those of hosts Sweden.

=== "Phantom of '50" ===
The term "Phantom of '50" was later used to refer to the fear that Brazilians and Brazil national football team feel of the Uruguay national football team due to this loss. Each time Brazil and Uruguay play at Maracanã Stadium, the theme resurfaces.

In 1993, after losing points in important matches (two draws with Ecuador and Uruguay themselves, and a loss to Bolivia in first round of the qualifiers), Brazil was struggling to qualify for the 1994 FIFA World Cup. The final match of the qualifying South American group between Brazil and Uruguay was tense, surrounded by fear, as Brazil needed to win the game to qualify. Brazil beat and eliminated Uruguay by 2–0, with two goals by Romário at the end of the second half, who had been ignored in the tournament and was urgently called in to save Brazil, who would go on to win the tournament.

The theme reappeared in the Brazilian press as Uruguay qualified for the 2014 FIFA World Cup hosted by Brazil. Uruguay often emphasized the theme, giving the team motivation and encouragement in matches against Brazil. Ironically, however, Uruguay lost 2–0 and were eliminated by Colombia at the very same Maracanã Stadium in the round of 16 of the tournament. Brazil's path again had a hard defeat, this time a 1–7 humiliation in the semi-final with Germany in Belo Horizonte, the game was subsequently known as "Mineirazo", given it took place at the Mineirão stadium and echoed the same sense of defeat as in 1950. Tereza Borba, adoptive daughter of goalkeeper Moacir Barbosa, who was scapegoated for the defeat for years, said the 2014 loss was enough to redeem her father's legacy, and most of the Brazilian media took the opportunity to contrast the 2014 semi-final as an embarrassment compared to the close defeat in the Maracanazo. Ghiggia himself, the only player from either 1950 squad who lived to see the 2014 loss, stated that while both games were traumatic, they could not be compared as the 1950 game had more at stake.

Ghiggia was the last surviving player from the game; he died on 16 July 2015, exactly 65 years after scoring the decisive goal, at the age of 88. Schlee died on 17 November 2018, aged 83.

== See also ==
- Brazil–Uruguay football rivalry
