= Brazil–Uruguay football rivalry =

International football rivalry

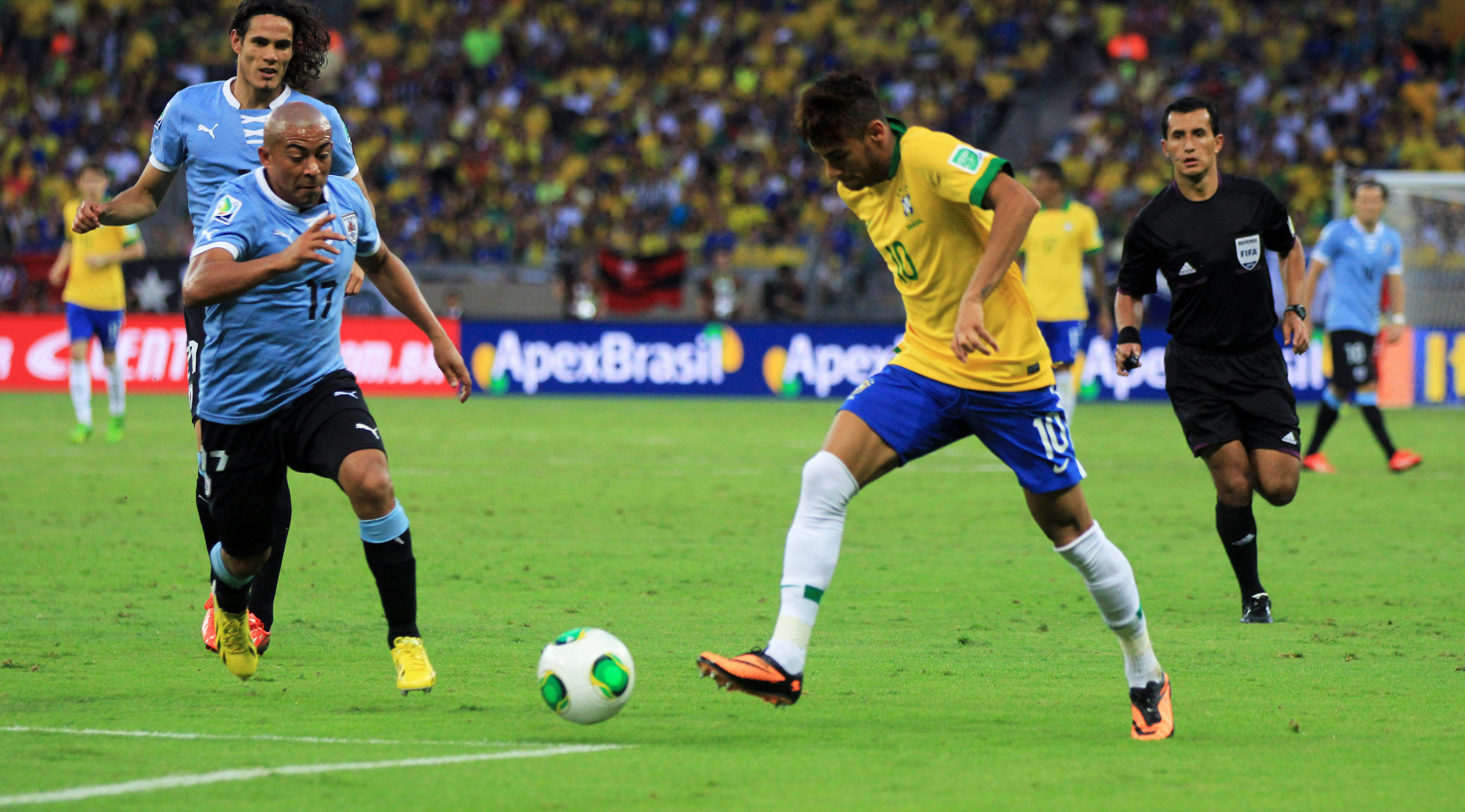
- Neymar (right) and Egidio Arévalo Ríos (left) competing for the ball at the 2013 FIFA Confederations Cup
- Other names: Clásico del Río Negro; Clássico do Rio Negro
- Location: South America (CONMEBOL)
- Teams: Brazil; Uruguay
- First meeting: 12 July 1916; Copa América; Uruguay 2–1 Brazil
- Latest meeting: 19 November 2024; FIFA World Cup qualification Brazil 1–1 Uruguay

Statistics
- Total meetings: 81
- Most wins: Brazil (38)
- All-time series: Brazil: 38; Draw: 21; Uruguay: 22
- Largest victory: Uruguay 6–0 Brazil; Copa América; 18 September 1920

The Brazil–Uruguay football rivalry, also known as El Clásico del Río Negro, or Clássico do Rio Negro is a highly competitive sports rivalry between the Brazilian and Uruguayan national football teams, and their respective set of fans. Association football is the most popular sport in both countries and they have a combined 7 FIFA World Cups and 24 Copa Américas between them. Both countries also have a very close proximity and border each other, Uruguay only has a population of 3.5 million, and has a size of 176,215 km^{2} while Brazil has a population of 210 million, and a size of 8,515,767 km^{2} making it the fifth largest country in terms of both population and size.

Although not considered as big as Argentina's rivalries with Brazil or Uruguay, the games between them have a very tense atmosphere due to their infamous encounter in the de facto final of the 1950 FIFA World Cup where Uruguay completely shocked the Brazilian favorites 2–1 at the Maracanã Stadium in Brazil, allowing La Celeste to claim their second World Cup title. The game nicknamed, the Maracanazo, is considered by many Brazilians (and the world media) as one of the nation's worst (and most embarrassing) ever defeats.

Since then, Brazil have proved to be the more dominant team in both head-to-head with Uruguay and at international tournaments like the FIFA World Cup. Uruguay has dominated Brazil in the regional Copa América. However, whenever they play against each other (especially at the Maracanã), there is a lot of fear in the Brazilian public that the "Phantom of '50" would resurface and they would lose again just like in 1950. Many Uruguayan fans love to remind their next-door neighbors of the "Phantom of '50", although many Brazilians say that the phantom is gone as Brazil have won 5 World Cups (the most of any nation), and Uruguay has not reached another final since. In any event, both teams had only one other encounter in the 1970 FIFA World Cup semifinals, which Brazil won 3–1. Brazil have also beaten Uruguay at the Maracanã multiple times since then. However, Brazil would suffer another embarrassing defeat at home soil: this time, against Germany, when they lost 7–1, at the Mineirão in the 2014 FIFA World Cup semi-finals.

== Historical ties ==
Uruguay has some historical ties to Brazil as the Thirty-Three Orientals successfully led a rebellion against the Empire of Brazil that eventually got them and the United Provinces of the Río de la Plata (now Argentina) to recognize Uruguay as an independent nation after signing the Treaty of Montevideo in 1828.

== Notable matches ==
=== First match ===
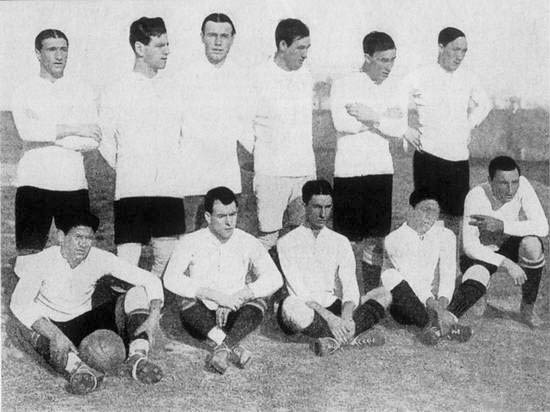
The Uruguay squad that won the first Copa América tournament

Uruguay and Brazil played their first official match against each other in 1916 in the inaugural South American Championship, where Uruguay won 2–1 and won the tournament after a 0–0 draw with Argentina. Brazil on the other hand, finished in 3rd place.

=== 1920 South American Championship ===
At the 1920 South American Championship, A Seleção recorded their biggest ever defeat to any country, when they conceded 6 goals to La Celeste on 18 September 1920 at the Estadio Valparaíso Sporting Club in Viña del Mar, Chile. 94 years later, The game held the record for Brazil's worst ever defeat until the Mineiraço match in 2014, where Germany tied the record to 7–1.

=== Copa Río Branco ===
From 1931 to 1976, Uruguay and Brazil irregularly met each other 10 times in the Copa Río Branco. The matches were used to decide which team was better at the time, similar to that of Roca Cup or Copa Lipton. Brazil won the first two editions in 1931 (in Rio de Janeiro) and 1932 (in Montevideo), both of them being one-off games. After that, every single edition until the final in 1976 would be a two-legged tie, with a win counting as 3 points and a draw counting as 1 point for each team. Goal difference wasn't taken into consideration. This would lead them to sharing the trophy in 1967 after they tied the first two matches and the replay.

=== 1950 FIFA World Cup ===
The 1950 FIFA World Cup final between them is perhaps the most famous match between Brazil and Uruguay as the match has been seen as the biggest in their rivalry. Brazil had cruised to victory in their first group stage, Group 1, as they beat every single team except Switzerland, who they only got to a 2–2 draw. Uruguay on the other hand, had only played one game in the entire tournament against Bolivia as France withdrew from the tournament and leaving the group with only two teams. Uruguay demolished Bolivia 8–0 and automatically qualified to the final round. Before the final match, Brazil had beaten Sweden 7–1 and Spain 6–1, while Uruguay barely scraped a 2–2 draw with Spain and a 3–2 win over Sweden. Brazil had also won the 1949 South American Championship, just a year before (also in Brazil), and many Brazilians expected a repeat of their 5–1 win over them during the tournament. Much of Brazil was already celebrating their victory before the match began. Multiple Brazilian news publications had already reported a Brazilian victory, while many civilians were busy in the streets, anticipating what-would-have-been-then, Brazil's first World Cup triumph. On the contrary, Uruguay were preparing for an upset and captain, Obdulio Varela, told his teammates, while they were in his bathroom to spit and urinate on a bunch of Brazilian newspapers that had already declared Brazil, winners of the tournament. Brazil only needed at least a draw with Uruguay to win the competition, however, in the 79th minute of the match, Alcides Ghiggia, scored an unexpected winner under Brazilian goalkeeper, Barbosa, to bring the score 2–1 in Uruguay's favor. The entire stadium (except the Uruguayan players) was eerily quiet for some moments, returning to support Brazil for the rest of the game. However, after the final whistle, the crowd fell back into deep silence and sadness, and many Brazilians were heartbroken after the match and there was no celebration in the streets. Much of the blame of the loss was directed towards Barbosa, for not saving the crucial shot, and he wasn't allowed to come to commentate a match or come to a training session for fear that he would jinx the team. However, he said in an interview before his death in 2000 that, "The maximum punishment in Brazil is 30 years imprisonment, but I have been paying, for something I am not even responsible for, by now, for 50 years." Ghiggia, on the other hand would say that only 3 people have ever silenced the Maracanã: Frank Sinatra, Pope John Paul II, and him.

=== 1970 FIFA World Cup ===
Uruguay and Brazil wouldn't meet each other at another FIFA World Cup until 1970 in the semifinals. The game has been described by some as one of the more memorable matches between them as the game took place exactly 20 years and 1 day after the infamous Maracanaço. Brazil were looking to exact revenge for their loss in 1950, however Uruguayan winger, Luis Cubilla opened the score in the 19th minute, in what looked to be a repeat of the Brazilians' 1950 loss. However, Clodoaldo, would bring the score 1–1 before the 1st half ended, and Brazil's samba-style football would take over in the second half as Jairzinho and Rivellino would each score two goals to win the game 3–1. Pelé, also produced one of the most memorable plays in football history, when in the second half, he played a through pass from Tostão, and fooled Uruguay keeper, Ladislao Mazurkiewicz, by not touching the ball, causing the keeper to come out of his penalty area and allowing Pele to make a clear shot. However, in the end, he missed it and the ball went just wide of the far post.

Brazil would then go to the final, where they beat rivals, Italy, 4–1.

=== 1976 Taça do Atlântico ===
On 28 April 1976, Brazil and Uruguay played an infamous match during an exhibition tournament. The friendly game, however, was not friendly, as the competition got violent very early on. In the first half, Marco Antônio suffered a hard foul from Darío Pereyra and Hebert Revetria, which angered Rivellino, causing him to pull Pereyra's hair. Minutes later, Manuel Keosseián did a hard tackle on Rivellino, getting him sent off. Zico converted the penalty afterwards. Rivellino was still very bitter about the tackle, and chased after Keosseián, which caused him to elbow Attilio Ramirez. Rivellino and Ramirez would chase each other and argue about the entire thing for the rest of the match, and a full-on brawl broke out between the Brazil players and Uruguay players following the final whistle, as Ramirez chased Rivellino into the dressing room before being stopped by the other Brazilian players. Brazil won the game 2–1 at the Maracanã, with Uruguay's only goal coming from Jorge Torres. The arguments went on into the locker, and the game is still remembered for being the most violent showdown they have ever had.

=== 1983 Copa América final ===
The 1983 Copa América was the third consecutive and last edition of the tournament to be played in all 10 CONMEBOL countries. As such, the matches in both the group stage and knock-out stage were played on two legs. Both Uruguay and Brazil made it to the final, with the first leg being played in Uruguay. In the first leg, Uruguay won decisively 2–0 in Montevideo. In the second leg, Carlos Aguilera scored the equaliser which secured a win of the tie 3–1 on both points and aggregate to ensure Uruguay's 12th Copa América title.

=== 1989 Copa América ===
In 1989, Brazil and Uruguay met again in the decisive match of the final group stage of an international tournament held in Brazil, played at the Maracanã Stadium. Uruguay were looking for their 3rd consecutive Copa América trophy, while Brazil were looking for their first Copa América title in 40 years, and a chance to end the misery they put on themselves back in 1950. In the 49th minute, Romário scored the only goal of the game, to ensure Brazil's victory and avenge the team that lost at the same stadium back in 1950.

=== 1994 FIFA World Cup qualifier ===
During qualification for the 1994 FIFA World Cup, Brazil and Uruguay were drawn in the same group together along with Bolivia, Ecuador, and Venezuela, during which the top two would qualify for the tournament in a double round-robin format. In the first leg, Uruguay squeezed a 1–1 draw in Montevideo after a late Daniel Fonseca equaliser. The second leg was played on the last matchday with very high stakes in regard to qualifying as whoever won would qualify for the World Cup, while a loss could prove costly depending on the result of the other final match between Bolivia and Ecuador.

The final game was played on 19 September 1993 at the Maracanã in front of a sell-out crowd. The game was intense but the score was still goalless at half-time. In the 72nd minute, Romário soared and headed a powerful ball to break the dreadlock and score his first goal for the national team in 5 years after being exiled for disciplinary issues, despite being one of the best footballers in the world at the time. Ten minutes later, Romário scored again; this time running past keeper Robert Siboldi to tap it home and seal a 2–0 win. Because of Bolivia's draw with Ecuador, Uruguay narrowly missed out on qualifying by a point. At the World Cup in the United States, Romário would light up the tournament and lead them to their fourth World Cup title.

=== 1995 Copa América final ===
In 1995, Brazil and Uruguay met in the final match of the 1995 Copa América. At the time, Brazil had just won the 1994 FIFA World Cup final against Italy, and were looking to end Uruguay's streak on winning every international tournament hosted by Uruguay. The game ended 1–1 after 90 minutes, thanks to goals from Uruguay's Pablo Bengoechea and Brazil's Túlio. However, Túlio wouldn't score a goal in the penalty shootout, as his shot was saved by Uruguayan goalie, Fernando Álvez, allowing Uruguay to win the match 5–3 on penalties.

=== 1999 Copa América final ===
The two teams would rematch in the final again for the second time in three editions at the 1999 Copa América in Paraguay. This time Brazil would win comfortably 3–0 with a first half brace from Rivaldo and a close volley early in the second half from Ronaldo. The win earned Brazil their 6th Copa América title and marked the first time they ever won two consecutive editions.

=== 2002 FIFA World Cup qualifier ===
On 1 July 2001, Brazil played against Uruguay in a notable FIFA World Cup qualifier at the Estadio Centenario in Montevideo. The only goal of the game came from Federico Magallanes who converted a penalty in the 33rd minute. Brazil had many chances to score, however, they failed to make any chances. This was also Luiz Felipe Scolari's first game in charge of the national team, and he said that Rivaldo should have scored in the 85th minute. However, Uruguayan goalkeeper, Fabián Carini, appeared to be holding the ball in his own net, but referee Hugh Dallas did not think it was an equalizer. The game put a dent in Brazil's chances of qualifying, however they finished 3rd in the qualifying table, and Uruguay finished 5th, meaning that La Celeste would have to play in a Two-legged play-off against Australia, which they won 3–1 on aggregate. Uruguay would go on to be knocked out in the group stage, while Brazil would win the entire competition, when Ronaldo scored 2 goals in the final against Germany.

=== 2006 FIFA World Cup qualifier ===
Early in qualifying for the 2006 World Cup, Uruguay and reigning World Cup holders Brazil played each other in the fourth matchday at Brazil in a game which would prove to be an instant classic. In the first half Kaká and Ronaldo scored to give them a 2–0 lead at the half. In the 57th minute, Diego Forlán pulled one back after a Brazilian deflection landed perfectly on him to score. He would then score again in the 76th minute after some poor defending by Brazil let him equalise. Two minutes later, Gilberto Silva attempted to clear the ball away with his head, but it went right over the goalkeeper, giving Uruguay a 3–2 lead in Brazil. In the end, Ronaldo scored a last-minute equaliser to make the score 3–3 and prevent Brazil from losing their first ever World Cup qualifier at home.

=== 2004 Copa América ===
In 2004, the two teams met again in the Copa América semi-finals in Peru. Uruguay opened the scoring after Javier Delgado's free kick into the box reached Marcelo Sosa, who sent it to the back of the net with a diving header. Brazil equalised quickly at the start of the second half after Luís Fabiano passed to Adriano, who tapped it home. The game remained 1–1 after 90 minutes, so it went to penalties. In the shoot-out, Uruguayan player Vicente Sánchez's shot was saved by Júlio César which would prove decisive in Brazil winning 5–3 on penalties and progressing to the final.

=== 2013 FIFA Confederations Cup ===
The 2013 FIFA Confederations Cup semi-finals marked the first time the two countries had met at an official FIFA tournament since 1970. Brazil qualified as hosts of the 2014 World Cup, while Uruguay were the reigning holders of the 2011 Copa América. In the 13th minute of the game, Brazilian defender David Luiz pulled Diego Lugano in the box and the referee awarded Uruguay a penalty, which Júlio César) saved from Forlán. Brazil then opened the deadlock after Fred scored from a rebound by Fernando Muslera against Neymar in the 41st minute. Three minutes into the second half, Edinson Cavani equalised for Uruguay to level the score 1–1. Near the end of the game, Paulinho scored a last-minute winner for Brazil to make it 2–1 and send them through to their third consecutive Confederations Cup final.

=== 2024 Copa América ===
The most recent tournament match between the two occurred in the 2024 Copa América quarter-finals. Uruguay came into the tournament in great form, while Brazil was dealing with injuries to key players such as Neymar and Richarlison and going through an identity crisis. The match was very tense. In the 74th minute, Uruguayan player Nahitan Nández was sent off after an awful tackle on Brazilian forward Rodrygo. Despite being a man down for the rest of the match, the game ended 0–0 and went to a penalty shoot-out where Uruguayan midfielder Manuel Ugarte would score the game-winning penalty to progress Uruguay to the next round.

== Matches overview ==
As of 19 November 2024

Head-to-head statistics
Matches	Brazil wins	Draws	Uruguay wins	Brazil goals	Uruguay goals
81	38	21	22	143	101

== Titles overview ==
=== Senior or official ===
Competition	Brazil	Uruguay
FIFA World Cup	5	2
Olympic Games*	0	2*
FIFA Confederations Cup	4	0
Copa América	9	15
Panamerican Championship	2	0
Total titles	20	19

- Note: Only the Olympic titles from 1908 to 1948 are considered official senior titles.

=== Friendly ===
Competition	Brazil	Uruguay
Copa Río Branco	7	4
Taça do Atlântico	3	0
Kirin Cup	0	2
Taça Independência	1	0
Nehru Cup	0	1
Total	11	7

=== Youth ===
Competition	Brazil	Uruguay
Olympics IOC	2	0
Pre-Olympic	7	0
Pan American Games	5	2
FIFA U-20 World Cup	5	1
FIFA U-17 World Cup	4	0
South American Youth Football Championship	12	8
South American U-17 Championship	13	0
South American U-15 Championship	5	0
Total	53	11

=== Women ===
Competition	Brazil	Uruguay
FIFA Women's World Cup	0	0
Copa América Femenina	8	0
South American U-20 Women's Championship	10	0
South American U-17 Women's Championship	5	0
Olympics	0	0
Pan American Games	3	0
Total	26	0

== Club ==
=== Club titles ===
Competition	Brazil	Uruguay
Intercontinental Cup	6	6
FIFA Club World Cup	4	0
Copa Libertadores	25	8
Copa Sudamericana	5	0
Recopa Sudamericana	13	1
Suruga Bank Championship	2	0
Defunct CONMEBOL club competitions	16	3
Total	71	18

=== Finals between clubs ===
Competition	Winner	Score	Runners-up
1961 Copa Libertadores Finals	Peñarol	1–0, 1–1	Palmeiras
1962 Copa Libertadores Finals	Santos	2–1, 2–3, 3–0	Peñarol
1980 Copa Libertadores Finals	Nacional	0–0, 1–0	Internacional
1983 Copa Libertadores Finals	Grêmio	1–1, 2–1	Peñarol
1993 Copa CONMEBOL Finals	Botafogo	1–1, 2–2 (3–1 p)	Peñarol
1994 Copa CONMEBOL Finals	São Paulo	6–1, 0–3	Peñarol
2011 Copa Libertadores Finals	Santos	0–0, 2–1	Peñarol

== See also ==
- History of the Brazil national football team
- Mongrel complex
- Argentina–Brazil football rivalry
- Argentina–Uruguay football rivalry
