= 1952 Panamerican Championship =

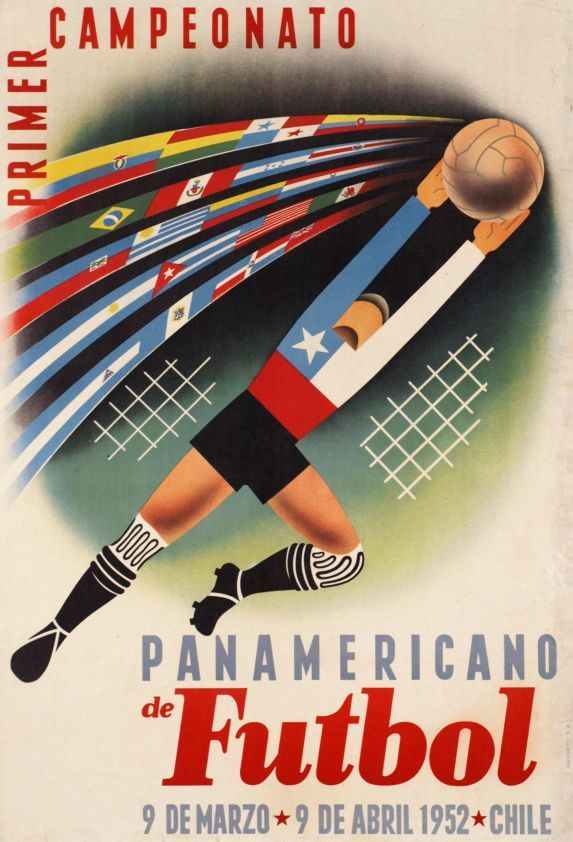
- Official poster

Tournament details
- Country: Chile
- Venue: Estadio Nacional
- Dates: 16 March – 20 April
- Teams: 6

Final positions
- Champions: Brazil (1st title)
- Runners-up: Chile
- Third place: Uruguay
- Fourth place: Peru

Tournament statistics
- Matches played: 15
- Goals scored: 72 (4.8 per match)
- Top goal scorer(s): (Peru) Valeriano López (7 goals)

The 1952 Panamerican Championship was the first edition of the Panamerican Championship, an association football tournament featuring national teams from North, Central and South America. Organized by the Panamerican Football Confederation, this first edition was held in Santiago, Chile, between March 16 and April 20, in 1952.

The competition, contested by six teams, was played in a round-robin format, and won by Brazil. All the matches were played at Estadio Nacional.

== Participating teams ==
6 teams participated in the championship, qualifying by various means:

Confederation	Team	Qualification Path
Host	Chile	Tournament organizer
FIFA	Uruguay	1950 FIFA World Cup Champion
Conmebol (South America)	Brazil; Peru	1949 South American Championship Champion; Third Place
NAFC (North America)	Mexico	1949 NAFC Championship Champion
CCCF (Central America and the Caribbean)	Panama	1951 CCCF Championship Champion

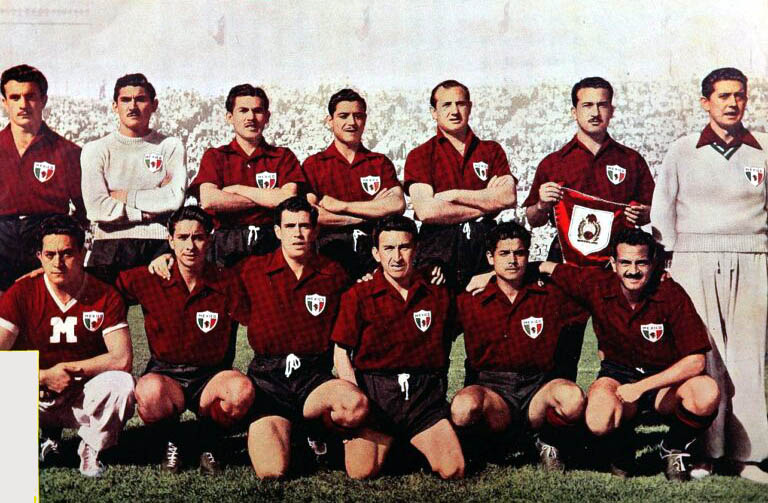
Mexico, 1949 NAFC Championship Champions

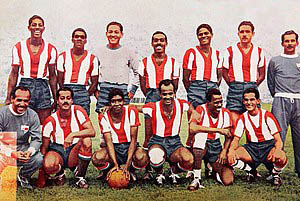
Panama, 1951 CCCF Championship Champions

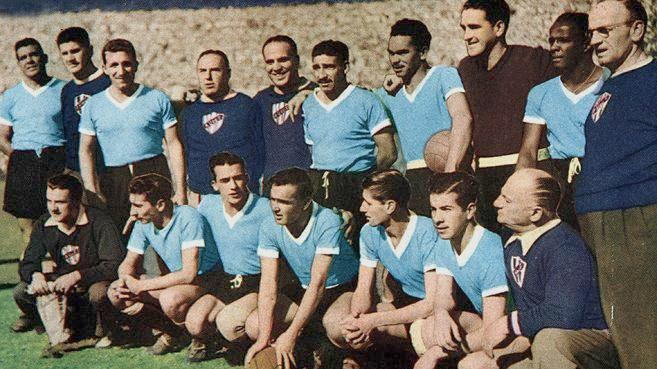
Uruguay, 1950 FIFA World Cup Champions

== Venue ==
Santiago
Estadio Nacional
Capacity: 70,000
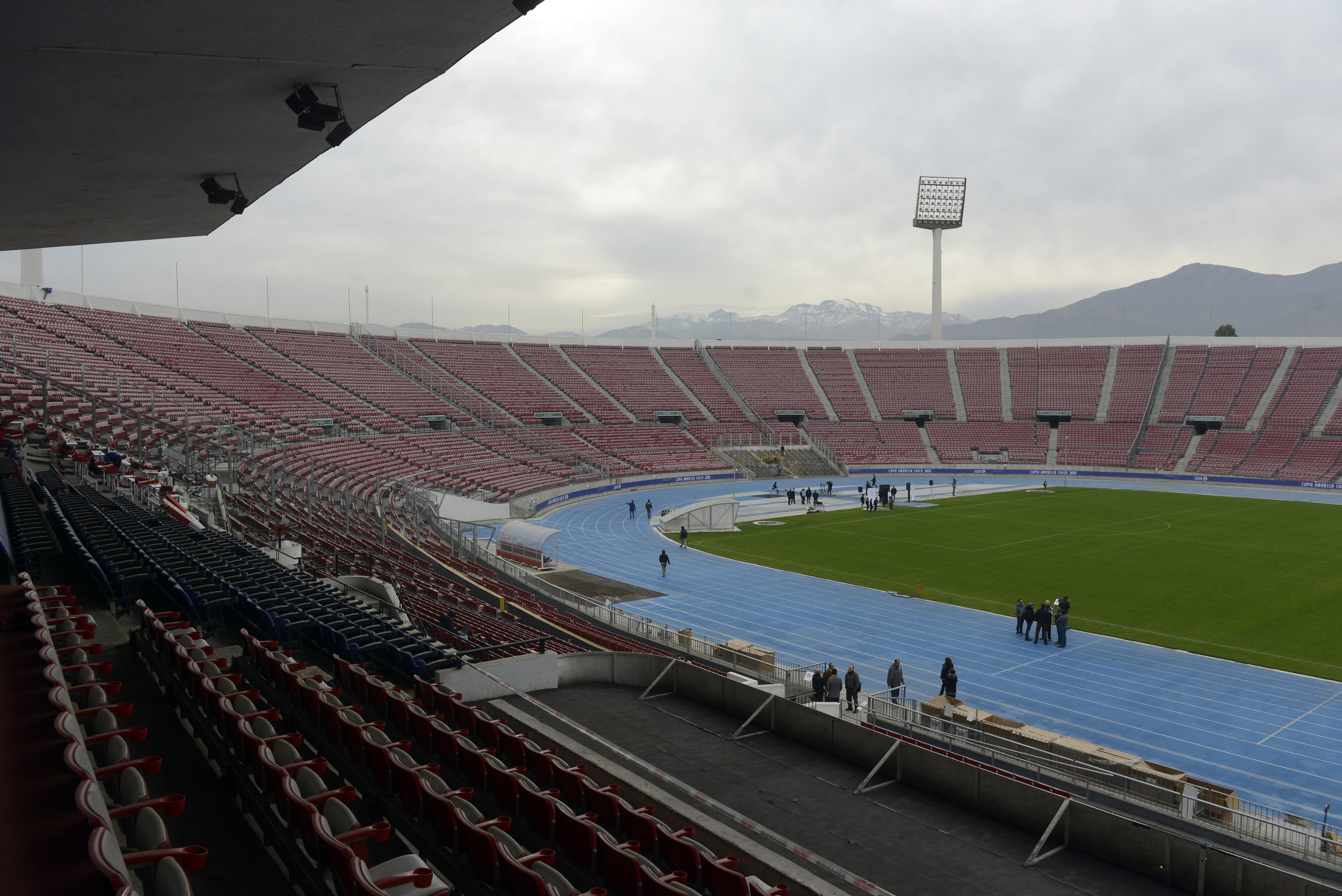

== Referees ==
- (England) Godfrey Sunderland
- (England) William Crawford
- (England) John Aldbridge
- (England) Charles Mckenna
- (England) Walter Manning
- (England) Charles Dean

== Results ==
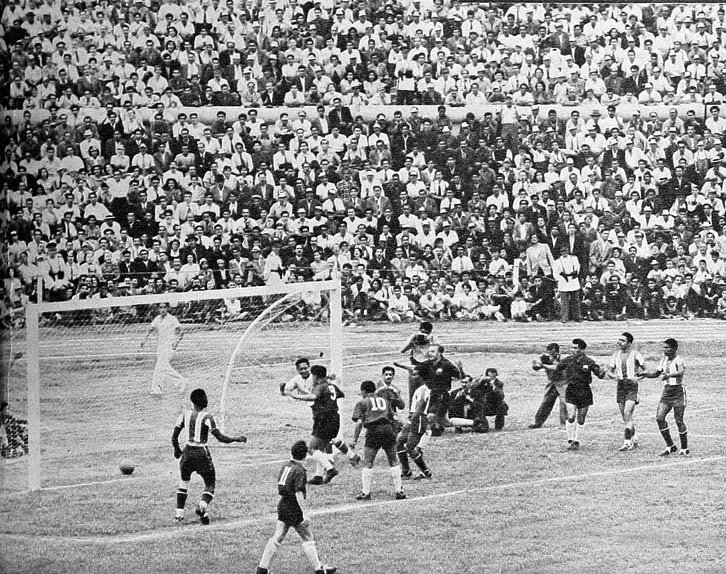
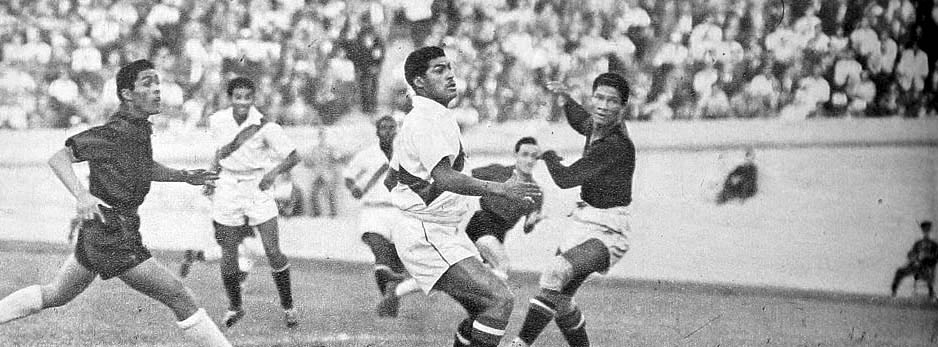
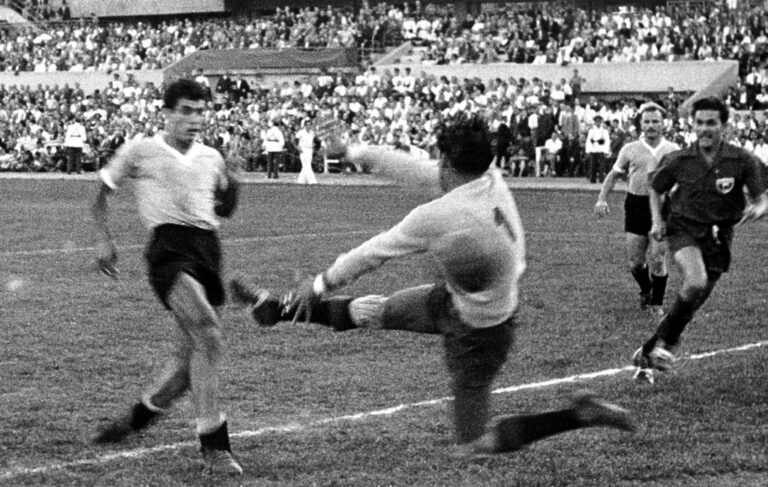
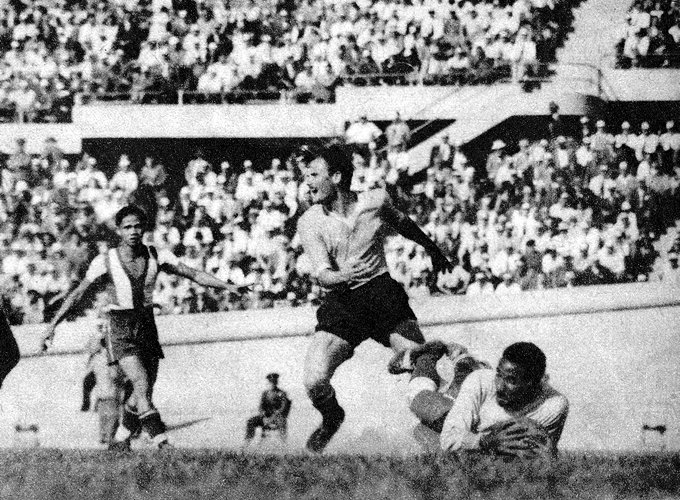
Some of the matches played, fltr: Chile v Panama, Chile v Peru, Uruguay v Mexico, and Uruguay v Panama

=== Match details ===
16 March

Chile	6–1	Panama
Hormazábal 15'; Prieto 27', 45', 81'; Muñoz 29'; Meléndez 65'	Report	Linares 89'

Estadio Nacional, Santiago

23 March

Peru	7–1	Panama
López 5', 9', 20', 85', 87'; Barbadillo 44'; Morales 60'	Report	Martínez 72' (pen.)

Estadio Nacional, Santiago

23 March

Uruguay	3–1	Mexico
Bravo 27' (o.g.); Míguez 40'; Abbadie 87'	Report	Septién 35'

Estadio Nacional, Santiago

26 March

Chile	4–0	Mexico
Hormazábal 20'; Prieto 30', 82'; Díaz 86'	Report

Estadio Nacional, Santiago

30 March

Uruguay	5–2	Peru
Vidal 2'; Míguez 11', 29', 87'; Pérez 74'	Report	Barbadillo 19'; López 75'

Estadio Nacional, Santiago

2 April

Chile	3–2	Peru
Prieto 31'; Meléndez 51' (pen.); Cremaschi 86'	Report	Barbadillo 14'; López 81'

Estadio Nacional, Santiago

6 April

Uruguay	6–1	Panama
Abbadie 6', 14', 32'; Britos 64'; Tejada 77' (o.g.); Loureiro 85'	Report	Martínez 39'

Estadio Nacional, Santiago

6 April

Brazil	2–0	Mexico
Baltasar 55', 71'	Report

Estadio Nacional, Santiago

10 April

Mexico	4–2	Panama
Septién 18', 34', 81'; Molina 19'	Report	Martínez 63' (pen.); Rangel 78'

Estadio Nacional, Santiago

10 April

Brazil	0–0	Peru
	Report

Estadio Nacional, Santiago

13 April

Brazil	5–0	Panama
Baltazar 5'; Rodrigues 8', 57'; Julinho 20'; Pinga 70'	Report

Estadio Nacional, Santiago

13 April

Chile	2–0	Uruguay
Cremaschi 5'; Muñoz 84'	Report

Estadio Nacional, Santiago

16 April

Brazil	4–2	Uruguay
Didi 24'; Rodrigues 32'; Baltazar 71'; Pinga 85'	Report	Míguez 54'; Cancela 89' (pen.)

Estadio Nacional, Santiago

20 April

Peru	3–0	Mexico
Rivera 5'; Drago 16'; Torres 86'	Report

Estadio Nacional, Santiago

20 April

Brazil	3–0	Chile
Ademir 9', 18'; Pinga 86'	Report

Estadio Nacional, Santiago

1952 Panamerican Championship

Brazil
1st title

== Table ==
Pos	Team	Pld	W	D	L	GF	GA	GD	Pts
1	Brazil	5	4	1	0	14	2	+12	9
2	Chile	5	4	0	1	15	6	+9	8
3	Uruguay	5	3	0	2	16	10	+6	6
4	Peru	5	2	1	2	14	9	+5	5
5	Mexico	5	1	0	4	5	14	−9	2
6	Panama	5	0	0	5	5	28	−23	0

Source: RSSSF

== Awards ==
=== Top goalscorer ===
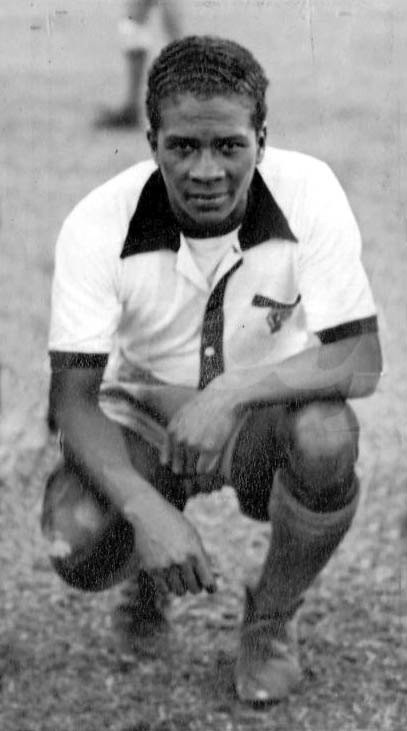
Peruvian Valeriano López, top scorer of the competition

There were 72 goals scored in 15 matches, for an average of 4.8 goals per match.

7 goals

- (Peru) Valeriano López

6 goals

- (Chile) Andrés Prieto

5 goals

- (Uruguay) Óscar Míguez

4 goals

- (Uruguay) Julio Abbadie
- (Mexico) Carlos Septién
- (Brazil) Baltazar

Source: RSSSF

=== Team of the Tournament ===
Ideal XI by La Nación
Goalkeeper	Defenders	Midfielders	Forwards
(Mexico) Antonio Carbajal	(Uruguay) Héctor Vilches (Brazil) Pinheiro	(Chile) Ramiro Cortés (Brazil) Brandãozinho (Uruguay) Víctor Rodríguez Andrade	(Chile) Guillermo Díaz (Uruguay) Julio Abbadie (Peru) Valeriano López (Brazil) Didi (Uruguay) Alcides Ghiggia
