= Gérson dos Santos =

Brazilian footballer (1922–2002)

Personal information
- Date of birth: 14 July 1922
- Place of birth: Belo Horizonte, Brazil
- Date of death: 5 June 2002 (aged 79)
- Place of death: Belo Horizonte, Brazil
- Position: Midfielder

Youth career
- Pitangui-MG

Senior career*
Years	Team	Apps	(Gls)
1942–1945	Cruzeiro	31	(0)
1945–1956	Botafogo	371	(2)
1946	→ Cruzeiro (loan)	1	(0)
1956–1957	Cruzeiro	7	(0)

International career
1952–1954	Brazil	3	(0)

Managerial career
- 1957: Cruzeiro
- 1958–1959: Cruzeiro
- 1962: Cruzeiro
- 1966–1967: Atlético Mineiro
- 1969–1970: Cruzeiro
- 1974: Vila Nova
- 1977: Vila Nova
- 1981: Remo
- * Club domestic league appearances and goals

Gérson dos Santos (14 July 1922 – 5 June 2002) was a Brazilian professional footballer and manager, who played as a midfielder.

== Club career ==
Gérson dos Santos began his career at Pitangui FC in Belo Horizonte. As a professional, he arrived at Palestra Itália (currently Cruzeiro EC) in 1942, where as a youth player, he was part of the three-time state champion squad in 1943–45. Still, in 1945, he was transferred to Botafogo, where he marked his time by making 371 appearances and becoming the state champion in 1948. Gérson formed the defensive system called the "maginot line" at Botafogo, alongside Oswaldo Baliza and Nilton Santos. He still returned to Cruzeiro, where he ended his career as a player.

== International career ==
For the Brazil national team, dos Santos was part of the winning squad of the 1952 Panamerican Championship, playing one match in the campaign. In 1954 he was called up again, participating in two matches for the 1954 FIFA World Cup qualification.

== Managerial career ==
As a coach, Gérson dos Santos began his career immediately after retiring in 1957 at Cruzeiro. He also had spells at Atlético Mineiro, Vila Nova and Remo.

== Honours ==
Cruzeiro

- Campeonato Mineiro: 1943, 1944, 1945

Botafogo

- Campeonato Carioca: 1948

Brazil

- Panamerican Championship: 1952
