= José Parra (footballer) =

Spanish footballer

Personal information
- Full name: José Parra Martínez
- Date of birth: 28 August 1925
- Place of birth: Blanes, Spain
- Date of death: 29 February 2016 (aged 90)
- Place of death: Terrassa, Spain
- Height: 1.74 m (5 ft 9 in)
- Position: Defender

Youth career
- San Pablo del Campo

Senior career*
| Years | Team | Apps | (Gls) |
- Poble Sec
- Júpiter
| 1945–1947 | Terrassa | | |
| 1947–1959 | Español | 216 | (1) |
| 1959–1960 | Cartagena | | |

International career
| 1954 | Spain B | 1 | (0) |
| 1950–1951 | Spain | 7 | (0) |
- * Club domestic league appearances and goals

José Parra Martínez (28 August 1925 – 29 February 2016) was a Spanish footballer who played as a defender.

== Club career ==
Born in Blanes, Province of Girona, Catalonia, Parra's professional career was entirely spent with RCD Español in his native region. He signed with the club in 1947 from neighbouring Terrassa FC, going on to compete with the former in 12 La Liga seasons.

Parra scored his only league goal for the Pericos on 17 October 1948, in a 5–0 home win against RC Celta de Vigo. He retired in June 1960 at the age of 35, following a spell with Cartagena FC.

== International career ==
Parra earned seven caps for Spain in one year. His first came on 9 April 1950, in a 2–2 away draw with Portugal for the 1950 FIFA World Cup qualifiers.

Selected by manager Guillermo Eizaguirre for the finals in Brazil, Parra played five times during the tournament to help to a final fourth place.

== Death ==
Parra died on 29 February 2016 in Terrassa, aged 90. He was the last survivor of the team that appeared in the 1950 World Cup.
