= Bigode =

Brazilian footballer (1922–2003)

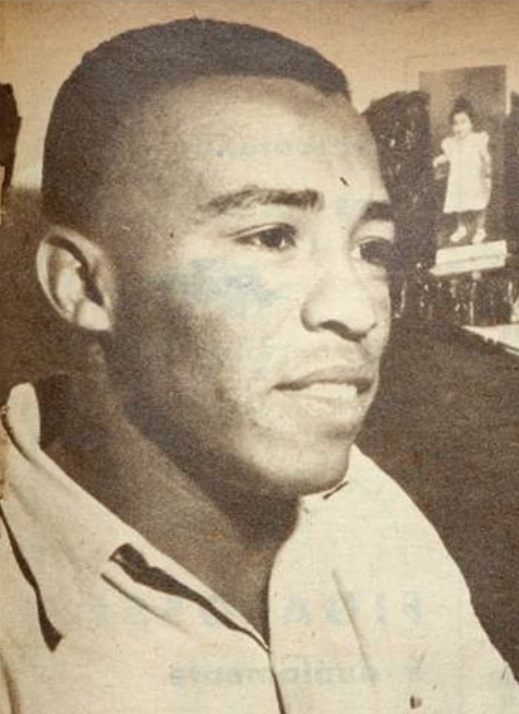
- Bigode in 1950

Personal information
- Full name: João Ferreira
- Date of birth: 4 April 1922
- Place of birth: Belo Horizonte, Brazil
- Date of death: 31 July 2003 (aged 81)
- Place of death: Belo Horizonte, Brazil
- Position: Left back

Senior career*
Years	Team	Apps	(Gls)
1940–1943	Atlético Mineiro		
1943–1949	Fluminense		
1949–1952	Flamengo		
1952–1956	Fluminense		

International career
1949–1953	Brazil	10	(0)
Medal record
Men's Football
Representing Brazil
FIFA World Cup
Runner-up	1950 Brazil
South American Championship
Winner	1949 Brazil
Panamerican Championship
Winner	1952 Chile
- * Club domestic league appearances and goals

João Ferreira, usually known as Bigode ("moustache" in Portuguese) (4 April 1922 – 31 July 2003), was a Brazilian footballer who played left back and also played in the 1950 FIFA World Cup.

== Club career ==
Bigode started his career playing for Atlético Mineiro, of his home city Belo Horizonte, Minas Gerais state. He won the Campeonato Mineiro twice, in 1941 and in 1942. He then moved to Fluminense of Rio de Janeiro in 1943, where he won the Campeonato Carioca in 1946. After leaving Fluminense in 1949, Bigode joined his former club's rivals Flamengo in 1950, where he stayed until 1952, when he returned to Fluminense, and retired in 1956.

== International career ==
Bigode played eleven matches for the Brazil national team between 1949 and 1953. In 1949, he won the South American Championship. He was also part of the Brazilian team that finished as the 1950 FIFA World Cup's runners-up, after being defeated 2–1 by Uruguay at Estádio do Maracanã, in what is known as the Maracanazo. In this game Bigode was in poor form, as Alcides Ghiggia dribbled him in both Uruguayan goals. However, it was goalkeeper Moacyr Barbosa who was blamed for the defeat.

== Death ==
Bigode died in Belo Horizonte on 31 July 2003 after suffering from respiratory problems.

== Honours ==
=== Club ===
Atlético Mineiro

- Campeonato Mineiro: 1941, 1942

Fluminense

- Campeonato Carioca: 1946
- Copa Rio: 1952

=== International ===
Brazil

- South American Championship: 1949
- Panamerican Championship: 1952
- FIFA World Cup runner-up: 1950
