= Gilberto Torres (footballer) =

Peruvian footballer (1928–2012)

Personal information
- Full name: Gilberto Torres Morales
- Date of birth: 15 August 1928
- Place of birth: Callao, Peru
- Date of death: 2 May 2012 (aged 83)
- Position: Forward

Senior career*
Years	Team	Apps	(Gls)
1945	KDT Nacional	15	(6)
1946–1949	Universitario	54	(18)
1950–1951	América de Cali		
1951–1955	Universitario	56	(11)
1956	Atlético Chalaco		

International career
1952–1953	Peru	11	(1)
- * Club domestic league appearances and goals

Gilberto Torres Morales (15 August 1928 – 2 May 2012) was a Peruvian professional footballer who played as forward.

== Playing career ==
=== Club career ===
Nicknamed Bailarina Loca (the crazy dancer), Gilberto Torres began his career at KDT Nacional. In 1946, he signed with Universitario de Deportes and played his first match for his new club on 14 April 1946, in a derby against Alianza Lima (a 6-2 victory). He won two Peruvian championships with Universitario in 1946 and 1949, with a total of 102 matches played (29 goals scored) for the club between 1946 and 1955.

In 1950, he had the opportunity to move to Colombia to play for América de Cali, a club that had a large contingent of Peruvian players in its ranks.

=== International career ===
A Peruvian international, Gilberto Torres played 11 times for the national team between 1952 and 1953. He notably participated in the 1952 Panamerican Championship in Chile (where he scored his only goal for the national team), followed by the 1953 South American Championship held in Peru in 1953.

== Honours ==
Universitario de Deportes

- Peruvian Primera División (2): 1946, 1949
