= Juvenal (footballer, born November 1923) =

Brazilian footballer

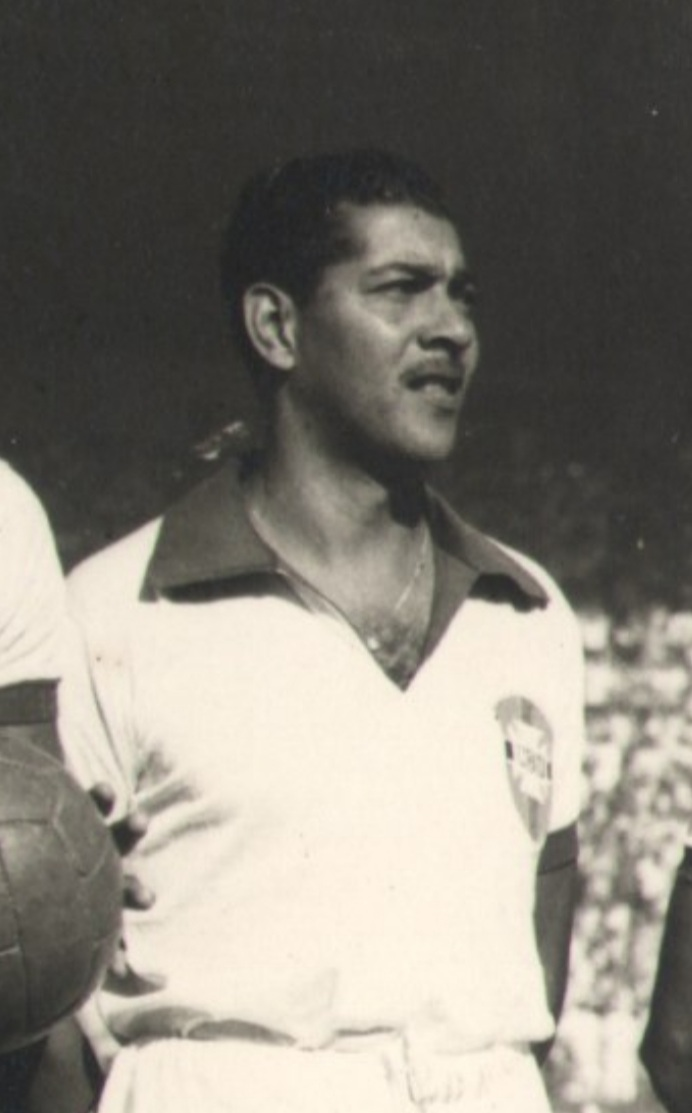
- Juvenal in 1950

Personal information
- Full name: Juvenal Amarijo
- Date of birth: November 27, 1923
- Place of birth: Santa Vitória do Palmar, Brazil
- Date of death: October 30, 2009 (aged 85)
- Place of death: Salvador, Brazil
- Position: Centre-back

Senior career*
Years	Team	Apps	(Gls)
1943–1948	Cruzeiro-RS	413	(20)
1949–1951	Flamengo	79	(0)
1951–1954	Palmeiras	148	(2)
1954–1958	Bahia		
1958–1959	Ypiranga-BA		

International career
1944–1950	Brazil	22	(1)
Medal record
Representing Brazil
FIFA World Cup
Runner-up	1950 Brazil
- * Club domestic league appearances and goals

Juvenal Amarijo (November 27, 1923 – October 30, 2009) was a Brazilian footballer who played as a defender. He was born in Santa Vitória do Palmar, Brazil.

== Career ==
Juvenal Amarijo started his career with Cruzeiro-RS, joining Flamengo in 1949, then Palmeiras in 1951, moving to Bahia in 1954 then retiring in 1959 while defending Ypiranga-BA.

He played for the Brazil in the 1950 FIFA World Cup, and was the last surviving Brazilian player from the final match of the tournament upon his death on October 30, 2009, at age 85, in the city of Salvador, in Bahia, Brazil, due to respiratory failure.

== Honours ==
Palmeiras

- Copa Rio: 1951
- Torneio Rio–São Paulo: 1951

Bahia

- Campeonato Baiano: 1954, 1956

Brazil

- FIFA World Cup runner-up: 1950

Individual

- Copa Rio Team of the Tournament: 1951
