= Lennart Samuelsson =

Swedish footballer and manager

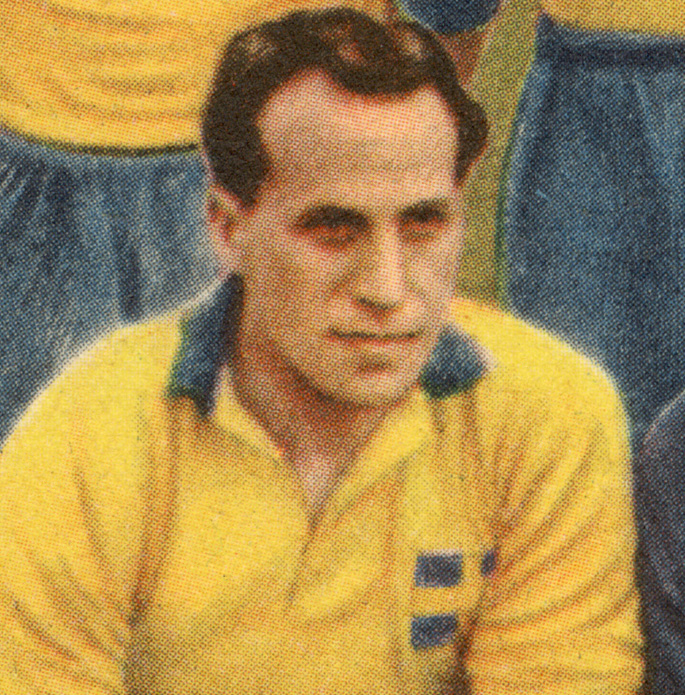
- Samuelsson with Sweden c. 1952

Personal information
- Date of birth: 7 July 1924
- Place of birth: Borås, Sweden
- Date of death: 27 November 2012 (aged 88)
- Place of death: Borlänge, Sweden
- Position: Defender

Senior career*
Years	Team	Apps	(Gls)
1947–1950	IF Elfsborg		
1950–1951	Nice	9	(0)
1951–1956	IF Elfsborg		

International career
1950–1955	Sweden	36	(0)

Managerial career
- IFK Luleå
- 1962–1966: IK Brage
- 1967–1970: Örebro SK
- 1971–1973: IK Brage
Medal record
Representing Sweden
FIFA World Cup
Third place	1950 Brazil
Olympic Games
Bronze medal – third place	1952 Helsinki
- * Club domestic league appearances and goals

Torsten Lennart Samuelsson (7 July 1924 – 27 November 2012) was a Swedish footballer who played as a defender and won bronze medals at the 1950 FIFA World Cup and 1952 Summer Olympics.

Between 1950 and 1955 Samuelsson was capped in 36 international matches and scored no goals. Domestically he played for Elfsborg (126 matches, 2 goals in 1947–1954), and in 1951 he appeared in nine matches with the French club Nice. His career was cut short due to a broken leg. He later coached IFK Luleå, IK Brage and Örebro SK.
