= Rubén Morán =

Uruguayan footballer (1930–1978)

Personal information
- Full name: Rubén Morán
- Date of birth: August 6, 1930
- Place of birth: Uruguay
- Date of death: January 3, 1978 (aged 47)
- Position: Forward

Senior career*
| Years | Team | Apps | (Gls) |
| 1949–1954 | Cerro | | |
| 1954 | Defensor Sporting | | |

International career
| 1950–1953 | Uruguay | 5 | (1) |
Medal record
Representing Uruguay
FIFA World Cup
| Winner | 1950 Brazil |
South American Championship
| Third place | 1953 Peru |
- * Club domestic league appearances and goals

Rubén Morán (6 August 1930 in Montevideo – 3 January 1978 in Montevideo) was a Uruguayan footballer, who played for C.A. Cerro.

For the Uruguay national football team, he was part of the 1950 FIFA World Cup winning team, and he played in only one match in the tournament, the decisive match against Brazil that clinched the title for Uruguay. He scored 1 goal in 5 matches.
