= Oswaldo Baliza =

Brazilian footballer

Personal information
- Date of birth: 9 October 1923
- Date of death: 30 September 1999 (aged 75)

International career
Years	Team	Apps	(Gls)
1949–1952	Brazil	2	(0)

Oswaldo Baliza (9 October 1923 – 30 September 1999) was a Brazilian footballer. He played in two matches for the Brazil national football team from 1949 to 1952. He was also part of Brazil's squad for the 1949 South American Championship and the 1952 Panamerican Championship
