= Saturnino Martínez =

Mexican footballer (1928–2019)

Personal information
- Full name: Saturnino Martínez Tirado
- Date of birth: 30 November 1927
- Place of birth: León, Guanajuato, Mexico
- Date of death: 21 March 2019 (aged 91)
- Position: Defender

Senior career*
Years	Team	Apps	(Gls)
- Club Necaxa

International career
1952–1954	Mexico	7	(0)
- * Club domestic league appearances and goals

Saturnino Martínez (30 November 1928 – 21 March 2019) was a Mexican footballer who played as defender who played for Mexico in the 1954 FIFA World Cup. He also played for Club Necaxa.
