= Antonio Greco =

Bolivian footballer (born 1923)

Personal information
- Date of birth: 17 September 1923
- Place of birth: La Paz, Bolivia
- Position: Defender

Senior career*
Years	Team	Apps	(Gls)
- Club Litoral

International career
- Bolivia
- * Club domestic league appearances and goals

Antonio Greco (born 17 September 1923, date of death unknown) was a Bolivian footballer who played as a defender.

== Biography ==
Greco was born in La Paz on 17 September 1923. He played for Bolivia in the 1950 FIFA World Cup. He also played for Club Litoral. Some sources mention Greco as born in Argentina. Greco is deceased.
