= Ingvar Gärd =

Swedish footballer

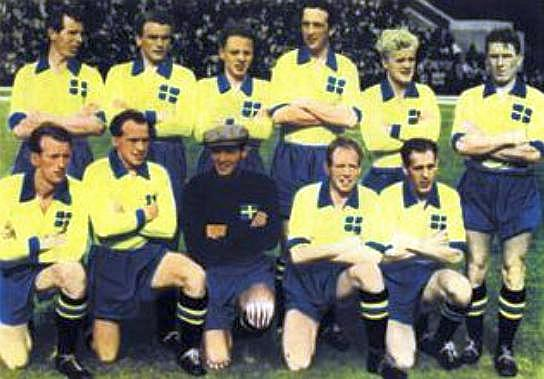
- Sverige 1950

Personal information
- Full name: Gustaf Ingvar Bertil Gärd
- Date of birth: 6 October 1921
- Place of birth: Sweden
- Date of death: 31 August 2006 (aged 84)
- Height: 1.81 m (5 ft 11 in)
- Position: Midfielder

Senior career*
Years	Team	Apps	(Gls)
1941–1950	Malmö FF		
1950–1951	Sampdoria	19	(0)

International career
1950	Sweden	6	(0)

Managerial career
- 1956–1964: IFK Malmö
- 1965–1966: Trelleborgs FF
- 1967–1969: Gunnarstorps IF
Medal record
Representing Sweden
FIFA World Cup
Third place	1950 Brazil
- * Club domestic league appearances and goals

Gustaf Ingvar Bertil Gärd (6 October 1921 – 31 August 2006) was a Swedish football midfielder who played for Sweden in the 1950 FIFA World Cup. He also played for Malmö FF.
