= Bauer (footballer) =

Brazilian footballer and manager (1925–2007)

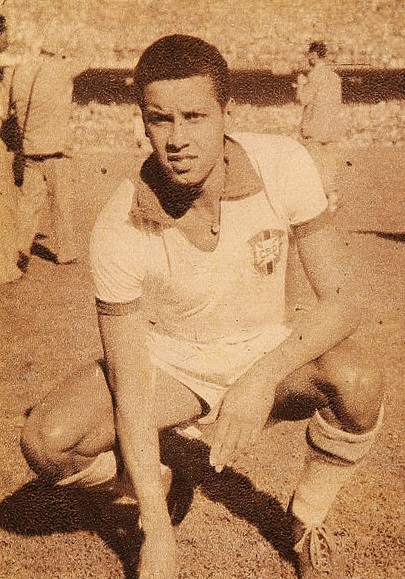
- Bauer in 1950

Personal information
- Full name: José Carlos Bauer
- Date of birth: 21 November 1925
- Place of birth: São Paulo, SP, Brazil
- Date of death: 4 February 2007 (aged 81)
- Place of death: São Paulo, Brazil
- Position: Defensive midfielder

Youth career
- 1938–1945: São Paulo

Senior career*
Years	Team	Apps	(Gls)
1945–1956	São Paulo		
1956	Botafogo		
1956	Portuguesa		
1957	São Bento		

International career
1949–1955	Brazil	26	(0)

Managerial career
- 1959: Juventus-SP
- 1960: Ferroviária
- 1960: Atlas
- 1965: Millonarios
- 1973: Comercial-MS
Medal record
Men's Football
Representing Brazil
FIFA World Cup
Runner-up	1950 Brazil
South American Championship
Winner	1949 Brazil
Runner-up	1953 Peru
Panamerican Championship
Winner	1952 Chile
- * Club domestic league appearances and goals

José Carlos Bauer (21 November 1925 – 4 February 2007), commonly known as Bauer, was a Brazilian football player and manager who played as a midfielder.

== Early life ==
Born in São Paulo, Bauer was the son of a Swiss father and an African-Brazilian mother. He was normally a defensive midfielder.

== Career ==
Bauer played for São Paulo and Botafogo. He won six São Paulo State Championships (1943, 1945, 1946, 1948, 1949 and 1953).

He played 29 matches for the Brazil national team, scoring five goals. He won the 1949 Copa América and participated at two FIFA World Cup finals, in 1950 and 1954. His last match in this tournament was the Battle of Berne.

After he retired he managed Ferroviária de Araraquara. In a trip to Ferroviária in Mozambique, Bauer saw a young Eusébio. Impressed with him, Bauer spoke with his former coach in São Paulo, Béla Guttmann, about Eusébio. Guttmann, who was coaching Benfica at the time, brought him to the Estádio da Luz.

== Death ==
Bauer died on 4 February 2007, in São Paulo.

== Honours ==
São Paulo

- Campeonato Paulista: 1945, 1946, 1948, 1949, 1953

Atlas

- Copa México: 1962
- Campeón de Campeones: 1962

Brazil

- South American Championship: 1949
- Panamerican Championship: 1952
- FIFA World Cup runner-up: 1950
- South American Championship runner-up: 1953

Individual

- Campeonato Paulista Team of the Tournament: 1946, 1947, 1948, 1949, 1953
- FIFA World Cup All-Star Team: 1950
