= Ramiro Cortés (footballer) =

Chilean footballer (1931-2016)

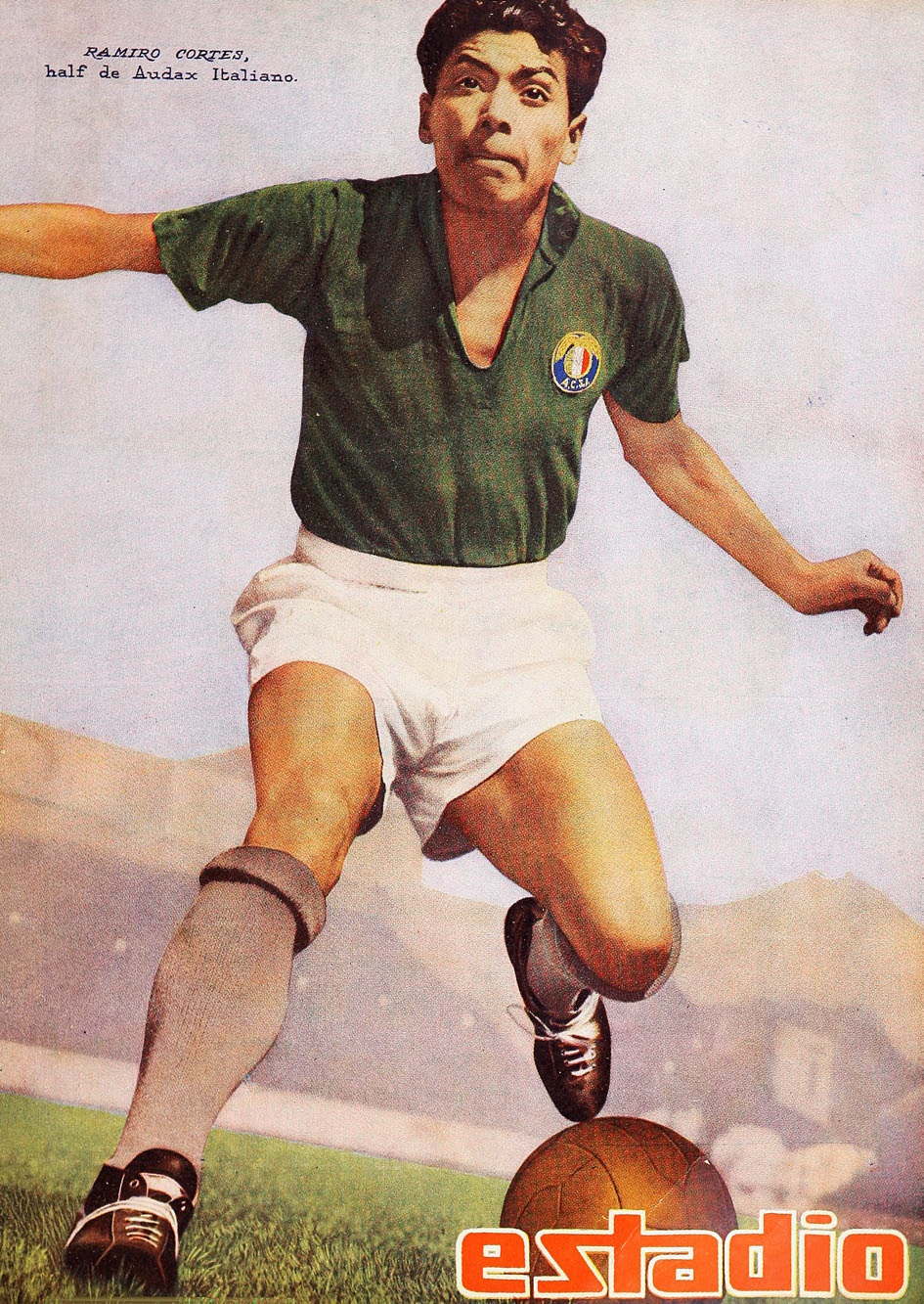

Personal information
- Full name: Sergio Ramiro Cortés Alba
- Date of birth: 27 April 1931
- Place of birth: La Serena, Chile
- Date of death: 9 November 2016 (aged 85)
- Place of death: Santiago, Chile
- Position: Midfielder

Youth career
- Bernardo O'Higgins
- Cachorros
- Escuela de Minas

Senior career*
Years	Team	Apps	(Gls)
1949–1951	La Serena (city team)		
1950–1961	Audax Italiano		
1962–1964	Unión Española	89	(3)

International career
1952–1960	Chile	45	(1)

Managerial career
- 1969: Audax Italiano
- * Club domestic league appearances and goals

Sergio Ramiro Cortés Alba (27 April 1931 – 9 November 2016) was a Chilean footballer.

== Career ==
Born in La Serena, Chile, as a youth player, Cortés was with Bernardo O'Higgins and Escuela de Minas in his hometown and Cachorros from Coquimbo. As a member of La Serena city team, he became national amateur champion in 1949 and 1951.

He came to Audax Italiano in 1950, playing for them until 1961. He also played for Unión Española from 1962 to 1964.

At the international level, he played in 45 matches for the Chile national team from 1952 to 1960. He was also part of Chile's squad for the 1956 South American Championship.

As coach, he briefly led Audax Italiano in 1969.

== Personal life ==
In his youth, he did track and field.

As a child, he was nicknamed Bototo (Boot) due to the fact that he wore leather boots in football. Once in Santiago, he was nicknamed Negro (Black).

== Honours ==
La Serena (city team)

- National Amateur Champion (2): 1949, 1951

Audax Italiano

- Primera División (1): 1957
