= Víctor Rodríguez Andrade =

Uruguayan footballer (1927-1985)

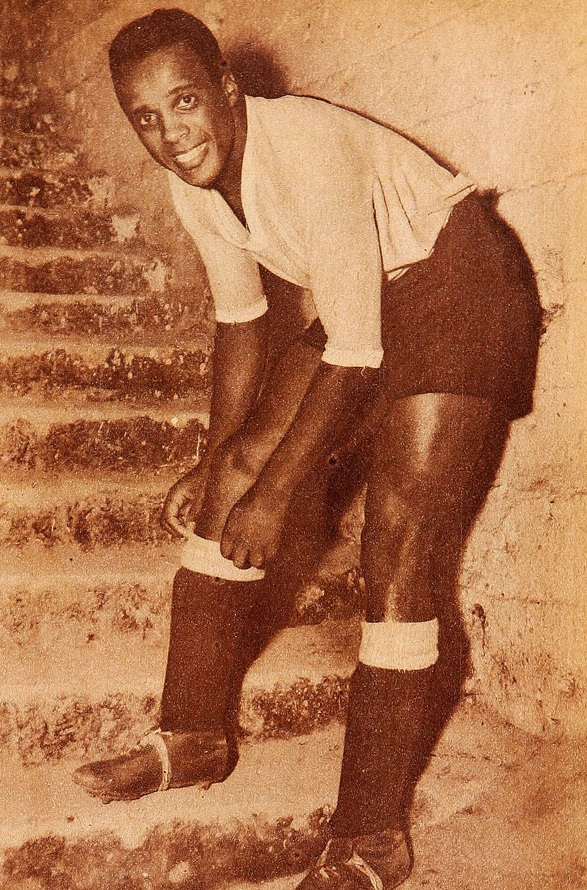
- Rodríguez Andrade in 1952

Personal information
- Full name: Víctor Pablo Rodríguez Andrade
- Date of birth: 2 May 1927
- Place of birth: Montevideo, Uruguay
- Date of death: 19 May 1985 (aged 58)
- Place of death: Montevideo, Uruguay
- Height: 1.69 m (5 ft 6 1/2 in)
- Position: Halfback

Senior career*
Years	Team	Apps	(Gls)
1945–1951	Central Español		
1952–1957	Peñarol		

International career
1947–1957	Uruguay	42	(0)
Medal record
Representing Uruguay
FIFA World Cup
Winner	1950 Brazil
South American Championship
Winner	1956 Uruguay
Third place	1947 Ecuador
- * Club domestic league appearances and goals

Víctor Pablo Rodríguez Andrade (2 May 1927 – 19 May 1985) was an Uruguayan footballer. He was the left halfback of the Uruguay national team that won the 1950 World Cup tournament, after defeating Brazil in the decisive match.

He was the nephew of another Uruguayan international player, José Leandro Andrade, who was also a World Cup winner, having played for the Uruguay squad that won the first ever edition in 1930.

Rodríguez Andrade also played at the 1954 World Cup and won the 1956 South American Championship with Uruguay, and at the club level, he won two Uruguayan First Division titles with C.A. Peñarol. He is regarded as one of the finest midfielders ever.

== Early life and career ==
Born in the Barrio Sur of Montevideo, Víctor Rodríguez came to the world into a family that proudly revered the name of his uncle, José Leandro Andrade. His admiration for his uncle and the naming customs made him use both last names; he drew comparisons with "The Black Marvel", not only because he was his relative, but also because they both played on the wing (although Andrade played in the right flank). Thus, the name Rodríguez Andrade would universally remain used when referring to the left midfielder, and sometimes he is even referred to simply as Andrade.

Growing up, Rodríguez played on the streets of Barrio Sur and Barrio Palermo. He began his footballing career at Central Fútbol Club, from the latter neighbourhood, and during his time at that club, he earned his first call up to the national team, in 1947. Remembered as one of the emblematic figures of the club in its first 100 years, he remained at Central until 1952, the year he joined Peñarol, with whom he won the Uruguayan Championship in 1953 and 1954.

== International career ==
Rodríguez Andrade wore the Uruguayan jersey from December 1947 to May 1957. He participated at the World Cup finals of 1950 and 1954, as well as the South American Championships of 1947 (his first official international tournament), 1953, and 1956. He earned a total of 42 caps for La Celeste with no goals.

=== 1950 World Cup and the Maracanazo ===
At the 1950 World Cup in Brazil, Rodríguez Andrade, who at 23 years old was one of the younger members of the Uruguayan squad, played in all four of his team's matches. In the final round match against the hosts, which would decide the winner of the tournament, his defensive duties included the marking of Zizinho, a task he was successful at until the beginning of the second half, when the Brazilian assisted Friaça, who scored the 1–0. However, as he later narrated himself, Rodríguez Andrade saw the lineman lift his flag during the play, indicating offside against Brazil. In the second the Uruguayan lost when he looked at the judge, Friaça left him behind, to face the goalkeeper one-on-one. When he was confronted by Obdulio Varela, Rodríguez told him: "Fue offside, Jacinto", and then, in a key moment of the game, the captain, with the ball under his arm, protested to the referee for several moments; the goal stood, but Varela had cooled down the situation for Uruguay, and silenced the crowd. Uruguay regrouped, and then Juan Schiaffino scored the equalizer and Alcides Ghiggia the winner, to complete the famous upset known as the Maracanazo.

=== 1954: End of World Cup glory ===
Four years later in Switzerland, the focal point of the World Cup finals was the Hungarian team. The "Golden Team" scored 17 goals in its two first round victories. Meanwhile, Uruguay played against Czechoslovakia and Scotland and won 2-0 and 7-0 respectively, to top their group. In the second round, they defeated England 4–2, and Hungary beat Brazil by the same score. The defending world champions and the favourites would clash in semi-finals. It took the Magyars 120 minutes to give Uruguay its first ever World Cup defeat. Rodríguez Andrade, just as he did in 1950, played in every match of the tournament, and had a strong performance in his final World Cup appearance, even though he had to play the extra time with a pulled muscle.

=== South American Championship ===
Uruguay, which had won its last South American title in 1942 when Rodríguez Andrade was in his teens, was unable to win it six straight times from 1945 to 1955, including the first two in which he appeared, 1953 and 1955. In the 1955 edition, they were humiliated in a 1–6 loss to Angel Labruna's Argentina. But in early 1956, Montevideo hosted the event, and veteran Andrade, who was the only remaining member of the 1950 World Cup final squad, led the Charrúas to win the title; they defeated Labruna and Omar Sivori's Argentina in the last match, which was, like six years earlier in Brazil, not a final, but just happened to be de deciding match. Rodríguez Andrade thus became the only Uruguayan player of his generation to win the World Cup and the South American Championship.

== After football ==
His last international match was on June 5, 1957, a 1–1 draw against Argentina. After ending his football career, he resided in Montevideo for the rest of his life. He worked as an usher at Montevideo's Palace of Congress for about 20 years, and during that time he was involved in the founding of basketball team 25 de Agosto of the Uruguayan Basketball Federation. Rodríguez Andrade died in May 1985, and a month after his death, Senator Luis Hierro Gambardella dedicated a speech to him during a session of the Congress.

In December 2005, the Uruguayan Postal Administration issued a stamp commemorating the 100th anniversary of the foundation of Rodríguez' first team, Central F.C. (since 1971 Central Español). The stamp featured the images of three of the most emblematic figures of the history of the club: in the center, Víctor Rodríguez Andrade, accompanied by his teammate Luis Rijo, and his coach Juan López.

In March 2007, after a 2002 resolution, the Junta Departamental de Montevideo and the city's Comisión de Nomenclatura designated a street of the Barrio Sur "Pasaje Víctor Rodríguez Andrade", to honor the footballer.

== Honours ==
Peñarol

- Uruguayan first division: 1953, 1954

Uruguay

- FIFA World Cup: 1950; semi-finalist: 1954
- South American Championship: 1956

=== Individual ===
- FIFA World Cup Dream Team: 1950, 1954
- IFFHS Uruguayan Men's Dream Team (Team B)
