= Héctor Vilches =

Uruguayan footballer (1926-1998)

Personal information
- Full name: Héctor Vilches
- Date of birth: February 14, 1926
- Place of birth: Montevideo, Uruguay
- Date of death: September 23, 1998 (aged 72)
- Position: Defender

Senior career*
Years	Team	Apps	(Gls)
- Cerro

International career
1950–1952	Uruguay	10	(0)
Medal record
Representing Uruguay
FIFA World Cup
Winner	1950 Brazil
- * Club domestic league appearances and goals

Héctor Vilches (14 February 1926 – 23 September 1998) was a Uruguayan footballer, born in Montevideo, who played for C.A. Cerro.

For the Uruguay national football team, he was part of the 1950 FIFA World Cup winning team, but did not play in any matches in the tournament. In total he earned 10 caps for Uruguay.

In his early days he played as a winger for his club, but he then became a right back with the national team, but could play in both positions. He played his whole career with his local club C.A. Cerro.

He retired in 1963.
