= George Mitchell (referee) =

Scottish referee (1912–?)

George Mitchell (born 22 February 1912) was a Scottish football referee. He was the first Scotsman to participate in a FIFA World Cup final match when he ran the line to George Reader in the 1950 final group match between Brazil and Uruguay.

Mitchell had been a class 1 referee from 1946 and had been appointed to only one match of note (the 1949 Scottish Cup semi-final between Rangers and East Fife) when he was selected to represent his country at the 1950 FIFA World Cup in Brazil. There he formed part of the first group of British referees ever to appear in a World Cup Finals tournament, (Note: There is some doubt as to nationality of Thomas Balway who represented France in 1930.) including Arthur Edward Ellis, Mervyn Griffiths, Reg Leafe and George Reader. Mitchell appeared in four matches during the finals: the opening game, a match from Pool C and two games in the final pool, including Brazil's victory over Spain.

After the finals Mitchell returned to Scotland, maintained his status as a FIFA referee until 1954–55 season (taking charge of the England against Scotland clash of 1951); as a class 1 referee until the 1961–62 season; then served as the SFA Referee Supervisor from the following season until 1988–89 season. He was also brought in to take charge of the Falkirk v Scotland XI friendly in 1955.
