= Schubert Gambetta =

Uruguayan footballer (1920–1991)

Schúbert Gambetta
Personal information
- Full name: Schúbert Gambetta Saint Léon
- Date of birth: April 14, 1920
- Place of birth: Montevideo, Uruguay
- Date of death: August 9, 1991 (aged 71)
- Height: 1.72 m (5 ft 7 1/2 in)
- Position: Defender

Senior career*
Years	Team	Apps	(Gls)
1940–1948	Nacional		
1949	Cúcuta Deportivo		
1950–1956	Nacional		
1956–1960	Mar de Fondo		

International career
1941–1952	Uruguay	37	(3)
Medal record
Representing Uruguay
FIFA World Cup
Winner	1950 Brazil
South American Championship
Winner	1942 Uruguay
Runner-up	1941 Chile
Third place	1947 Ecuador
- * Club domestic league appearances and goals

Schúbert Gambetta Saint Léon (14 April 1920 – 9 August 1991) was a Uruguayan footballer. He played as a half-back and was right-footed. Gambetta was a figure in the Maracanazo when he helped keep Zizinho and Ademir out of the game, which helped him to the 1950 FIFA World Cup All-Star Team.

From 1940 to 1956, he played for Club Nacional de Football, winning the Uruguayan championship ten times and captaining the team. He also earned 37 caps and scored three goals for the Uruguay national football team from 1941 to 1952. He was part of Uruguay's championship team at the 1950 FIFA World Cup.

== Honours ==
Nacional

- Primera División Uruguaya Winner: 1940, 1941, 1942, 1943, 1946, 1947, 1950, 1952, 1955 and 1956.
- Primera División Uruguaya Runner up: 1944, 1945, 1949, 1951, 1953 and 1954.
- Torneo de Honor Winner: 1940, 1941, 1942, 1943, 1946, 1948 and 1955.
- Torneo Competencia Winner: 1942, 1945, 1948 and 1952.
- Torneo Cuadrangular Winner: 1952, 1954 and 1955.
- Copa Aldao (Copa Río de la Plata) Winner: 1940, 1942 and 1946.
- Copa de Confraternidad Escobar - Gerona Winner: 1945.

Uruguay

- Copa Baron de Rio Branco Winner versus Brasil: 1946 and 1948.
- Copa Escobar Gerona Winner: 1945
- South American Championship 1942 Winner
- South American Championship 1947 Third Place
- 1950 FIFA World Cup Winner

=== Individual ===
- 1950 FIFA World Cup All-Star Team
- IFFHS Uruguayan Men's Dream Team (Team B)
