= Guillermo Eizaguirre =

Spanish footballer and manager

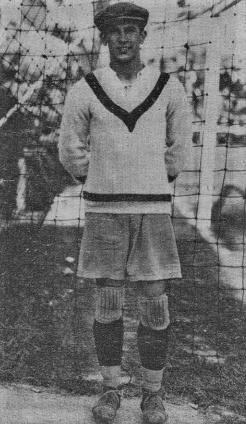
- Eizaguirre in 1929

Personal information
- Full name: Guillermo Eizaguirre Olmos
- Date of birth: 17 May 1909
- Place of birth: Seville, Spain
- Date of death: 25 October 1986 (aged 77)
- Place of death: Madrid, Spain
- Position: Goalkeeper

Youth career
- Sevilla

Senior career*
Years	Team	Apps	(Gls)
1924–1936	Sevilla	130	(0)

International career
1927	Spain B	1	(0)
1935–1936	Spain	3	(0)

Managerial career
- 1948–1950: Spain
- 1955–1956: Spain
- * Club domestic league appearances and goals

Guillermo Eizaguirre Olmos (17 May 1909 – 25 October 1986) was a Spanish football goalkeeper and manager.

He was born in Seville and played for Sevilla FC from 1924 to 1936, and also had three caps for Spain from 1935 to 1936. He was later the manager of the Spain national football team from 1948 to 1956, and led the team in the 1950 FIFA World Cup.

He died in Madrid on 25 October 1986.

== Honours ==
Sevilla FC

- Spanish Cup: 1934–35
