= Eusebio Tejera =

Uruguayan footballer (1922-2002)

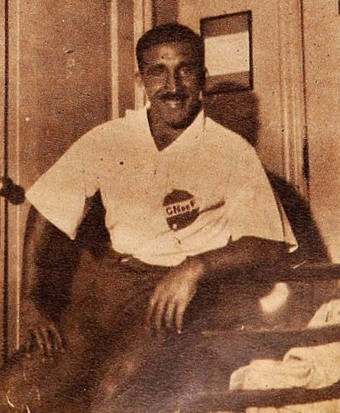
- Eusebio Tejera in 1948

Personal information
- Full name: Eusebio Ramón Tejera Kirkerup
- Date of birth: January 6, 1922
- Place of birth: Uruguay
- Date of death: November 9, 2002 (aged 80)
- Position: Defender

Senior career*
Years	Team	Apps	(Gls)
1943–1945	River Plate Montevideo		
1945–1950	Nacional		
1950–1951	Cúcuta Deportivo		
1951–1955	Defensor Sporting		

International career
1945–1954	Uruguay	31	(3)
Medal record
Representing Uruguay
FIFA World Cup
Winner	1950 Brazil
- * Club domestic league appearances and goals

Eusebio Ramón Tejera Kirkerup (6 January 1922 in Montevideo – 9 November 2002) was a Uruguayan footballer who played as a defender.

From 1945 to 1950 he played for Club Nacional de Football, winning the Uruguayan championship in 1946, 47 and 50. He also earned 31 caps for the Uruguay national football team from 1945 to 1954. He was part of Uruguay's championship team at the 1950 FIFA World Cup, known for the final match dubbed the Maracanazo, and also participated in the 1954 FIFA World Cup.
