= Juan Carlos González =

Uruguayan footballer (1924–2010)

Personal information
- Full name: Juan Carlos González Ortiz
- Date of birth: August 22, 1924
- Place of birth: Uruguay
- Date of death: February 15, 2010 (aged 85)
- Position: Defender

Senior career*
Years	Team	Apps	(Gls)
1945–1954	Peñarol		

International career
1950-1952	Uruguay	6	(0)
Medal record
Representing Uruguay
FIFA World Cup
Winner	1950 Brazil
- * Club domestic league appearances and goals

Juan Carlos González Ortiz (22 August 1924 – 15 February 2010) was a Uruguayan footballer who played for CA Peñarol.

He was part of the Uruguay national football team, which won the 1950 FIFA World Cup, participating in two matches during the tournament.

Gonzalez died on 15 February 2010, at the age of 85. His remains are buried at the Olympic Mausoleum, Buceo Cemetery.
