= Matías González (footballer, born 1925) =

Uruguayan footballer

Personal information
- Full name: Matías González
- Date of birth: August 6, 1925
- Place of birth: Artigas, Uruguay
- Date of death: May 12, 1984 (aged 58)
- Position: Defender

Senior career*
Years	Team	Apps	(Gls)
1946–1958	Cerro		

International career
1949–1956	Uruguay	33	(0)
Medal record
Representing Uruguay
FIFA World Cup
Winner	1950 Brazil
- * Club domestic league appearances and goals

Matías González (6 August 1925 in Artigas – 12 May 1984) was a Uruguayan footballer, who played as a defender for C.A. Cerro.

For the Uruguay national football team, he was part of the 1950 FIFA World Cup winning team, and he played in all four of Uruguay's matches in the tournament. In total he earned 33 caps for Uruguay.
