= Obdulio Varela =

Uruguayan footballer (1917–1996)

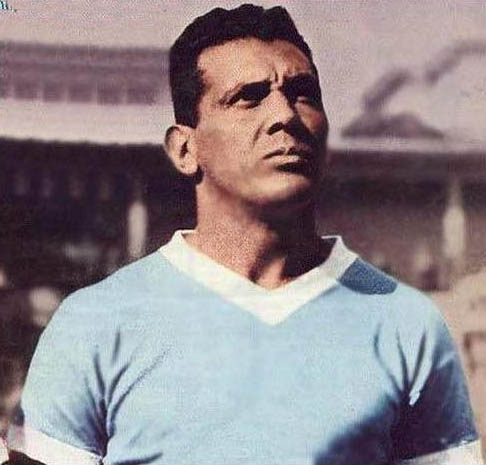
- Varela with Uruguay

Personal information
- Full name: Obdulio Jacinto Muiños Varela
- Date of birth: September 20, 1917
- Place of birth: Montevideo, Uruguay
- Date of death: August 2, 1996 (aged 78)
- Height: 1.83 m (6 ft 0 in)
- Positions: Holding midfielder; centre back

Senior career*
Years	Team	Apps	(Gls)
1936–1938	Deportivo Juventud		
1938–1943	Montevideo Wanderers		
1943–1955	Peñarol		

International career
1939–1954	Uruguay	45	(9)

Managerial career
- 1955: Peñarol
Medal record
Men's football
Representing Uruguay
FIFA World Cup
Winner	1950 Brazil
Copa América
Winner	1942 Uruguay
Runner-up	1939 Peru
Runner-up	1941 Chile
- * Club domestic league appearances and goals

Obdulio Jacinto Muiños Varela (Spanish pronunciation: [oβˈðuljo βaˈɾela]; September 20, 1917 — August 2, 1996) was a Uruguayan football player. He was the captain of the Uruguay national team that won the 1950 World Cup after beating Brazil in the decisive final round match popularly known as the Maracanazo. He was nicknamed "El Negro Jefe" (The Black Chief) because of his dark skin and the influence he had on the pitch, especially during the unlikely victory over Brazil. He was of African, Spanish and Greek ancestry. Commonly regarded as one of the greatest classic holding midfielders, Varela was adept in defence and was renowned for his tenacity and leadership. He is regarded as one of the greatest captains in football history, and "he remains one of the biggest sporting heroes in Uruguay".

== Club career ==
=== Deportivo Juventud (1936–1938) ===
Varela began his senior career at Deportivo Juventud in 1936. His early years at the club helped him develop the tenacity and leadership skills that would define his career.

=== Montevideo Wanderers (1938–1943) ===
In 1938, Varela moved to Montevideo Wanderers, where he debuted in the first division. His performances continued to impress, and he became a key player for the team.

=== C.A. Peñarol (1943–1955) ===
The most significant part of Varela’s club career was with C.A. Peñarol, which he joined in 1943. At Peñarol, Varela’s leadership qualities truly shone. He captained the team and led them to numerous domestic and continental successes. His influence on the pitch was immense, and he was known for his ability to inspire and rally his teammates.

During his time at Peñarol, Varela played a crucial role in several memorable matches. One notable instance was in 1945 when Peñarol faced River Plate. Varela’s dominant performance earned him and his teammates a significant bonus, which he insisted should be equally distributed among all players.

Varela retired from professional football in 1955, leaving behind a legacy as one of the greatest captains and holding midfielders in football history.

== International career ==
Varela's international debut came in a 3–2 win against Chile in the 1939 Copa América in Lima, Peru. Varela entered the match as a substitute.

He played 45 international matches for Uruguay from 1939 to 1954, in which he scored nine goals.

He is most remembered as the captain of the Uruguay team that won 1950 FIFA World Cup, in which he "was the architect of" Brazil's downfall. The decisive match was against the hosts Brazil. Uruguay needed to win, but Brazil could win the Cup with a draw. Then when the team were on the dressing room, Juan López, the coach of the Uruguayan team told his players that the best way they could get a chance against Brazil was if they adopted a defensive style, then he left the room and Varela told his teammates “Juan is a good man, but if we do defend ourselves then we will suffer the same fate of Sweden and Spain” (Brazil had beaten Sweden 7-1 and Spain 6-1), and then said “the game is played on the pitch, when you come out to the pitch, don't look to the crowd, those on the outside are made of wood”. The speech played a vital role on his teammates, who played without fear getting a 0–0 draw on the halftime. Five minutes in the second half, Brazil scored, and Varela took scene, when he intentionally walked slowly to his goal, picked up the ball and then argued with the English referee George Reader about a nonexistent offside, with the intention of delaying the restart of the game so the crowd cooled off. After that he said to his teammates 'Now it's time to win the game' and the Brazilians in the crowd were in a silent mood. Uruguay scored through Schiaffino and then, 9 minutes before the finish, with a very nervous Brazil team, Alcides Ghiggia scored the 2–1 for Uruguay, winning the World Cup. Following the win "Varela spent that evening drinking with shellshocked Brazilians in a Rio bar" ignoring the warnings of Uruguayan officials.

He also played on the 1954 FIFA World Cup with Uruguay defending his 1950 title, but this time, Varela got injured celebrating a goal in the quarter-final vs. England, which Uruguay won 4–2, causing him to miss the semi-final. Uruguay had never lost a World Cup match when Varela was present.

== Post-playing career ==
After retiring from professional football in 1955, Obdulio Varela transitioned into a coaching role. His last match as a player was on June 19, 1955, with Peñarol against América. During this match, Varela, who was also one of the team’s coaches alongside Roque Máspoli, came off the bench for the second half. However, realizing he couldn’t continue, he decided to end his playing career

=== Coaching and Legacy ===
Varela’s influence extended beyond his playing days. He continued to be involved in football, sharing his vast knowledge and experience with younger generations. His leadership and tactical acumen were highly respected, and he remained a significant figure in Uruguayan Soccer.

=== Death ===
Obdulio Varela died on August 2, 1996 and his remains are buried at Cementerio del Cerro, Montevideo.

== Honors ==
Peñarol

- Uruguayan Primera División: 1944, 1945, 1949, 1951, 1953, 1954
- Torneo de Honor: 1944, 1945, 1947, 1949, 1950, 1951, 1952, 1953
- Competencia tourney: 1943, 1946, 1947, 1949, 1951, 1953

Uruguay

- FIFA World Cup: 1950
- Copa América: 1942
- Copa Baron de Rio Branco: 1940, 1946, 1948
- Copa Escobar Gerona: 1943

Individual

- Copa América Best Player: 1942
- FIFA World Cup All-Star Team: 1950
- Varela was among the 13 best South American players of the 20th century according to the IFFHS' Century Elections.
- Copa América Historical Dream Team: 2011
