= Óscar Míguez =

Uruguayan footballer (1927-2006)

- Míguez in 1948

Personal information
- Full name: Óscar Omar Miguez Antón
- Date of birth: 5 December 1927
- Place of birth: Uruguay
- Date of death: 19 August 2006 (aged 78)
- Place of death: Artigas, Uruguay
- Position: Forward

Senior career*
Years	Team	Apps	(Gls)
1948–1959	Peñarol		
1960	Sporting Cristal		

International career
1950–1958	Uruguay	39	(27)
Medal record
Men's football
Representing Uruguay
FIFA World Cup
Winner	1950 Brazil
South American Championship
Winner	1956 Uruguay
- * Club domestic league appearances and goals

Óscar Omar Miguez Antón (5 December 1927 – 19 August 2006) was a Uruguayan footballer who played as a forward. He was part of the Uruguay team in the 1950 and 1954 World Cups, where he played as a striker, and is Uruguay's all-time record World Cup goalscorer with eight goals.

He played club football for Peñarol, and finished his career with Sporting Cristal.

Omar Miguez scored five times for his country on the way to a World Cup winners medal in 1950. He played all four games Uruguay played, scoring a hat-trick against Bolivia in an 8–0 win in the play-off for the final group. He struck the other two against Sweden in the last fifteen minutes of their in the final group, turning the tie around to win 3–2. These goals turned out to be decisive for the Uruguayans, as their subsequent sensational defeat of Brazil would have been useless, had it not been for the victory against Sweden. He also played in the other two final group games against Spain and Brazil.

Óscar Míguez in 1955

He also played in the 1954 World Cup. He scored three times in the group stage, once in a 2–0 win over Czechoslovakia and twice in a 7–0 win over Scotland. He also played in the quarter-final, defeating England 4–2, but was injured for Uruguay's defeats in the semi-final (4–2 a.e.t. against Hungary) and the third-place play-off (3–1 against Austria). From 1950–1958 he played 39 times scoring 27 goals which makes him the top 5th goalscorer for his country, only needing 4 goals to break the record.

He died in 2006 at the age of 78. His remains are buried at the Cementerio del Buceo, Montevideo.

== Career statistics ==
=== International ===
Appearances and goals by national team and year
National team	Year	Apps	Goals
Uruguay	1950	8	7
Uruguay	1951	0	0
Uruguay	1952	5	6
Uruguay	1953	1	1
Uruguay	1954	6	4
Uruguay	1955	5	3
Uruguay	1956	8	4
Uruguay	1957	4	1
Uruguay	1958	2	1
Total		39	27

== See also ==
- List of FIFA World Cup top goalscorers
