= Julio Pérez (footballer, born 1926) =

Uruguayan footballer (1926–2002)

Personal information
- Full name: Julio Gervasio Pérez Gutiérrez
- Date of birth: 19 June 1926
- Place of birth: Montevideo, Uruguay
- Date of death: 22 September 2002 (aged 76)
- Position: Forward

Senior career*
Years	Team	Apps	(Gls)
1944–1948	Racing Montevideo	100	(50)
1948–1950	River Plate Montevideo	30	(20)
1950–1957	Nacional	220	(137)
1957–1958	Internacional	40	(20)
1958–1960	Sud América	49	(29)
1960–1963	Rocha	56	(28)
Total		390	(227)

International career
1947–1956	Uruguay	22	(9)
Medal record
Representing Uruguay
FIFA World Cup
Winner	1950 Brazil
- * Club domestic league appearances and goals

Julio Gervasio Pérez Gutiérrez (19 June 1926 – 22 September 2002) was a Uruguayan footballer who played as a forward.

== Career ==
Pérez started his career at Racing Montevideo and River Plate Montevideo. From 1950 to 1957, he played for Club Nacional de Football, winning the Uruguayan championship in 1950, 1952, 1955 and 1956. In Brazil, he played for Sport Club Internacional, then he returned to Uruguay to join Sud América and Rocha.

He also earned 22 caps and scored 9 goals for the Uruguay national football team from 1947 to 1956. He was part of Uruguay's championship team at the 1950 FIFA World Cup, (Note: During the 1950 World Cup final match against Brazil, he famously wet himself during the national anthem.) and also participated in the 1954 FIFA World Cup.

Pérez died in 2002. His remains are buried at Cementerio del Buceo, Montevideo.
