= Ernesto Vidal =

Uruguayan footballer (1921–1974)

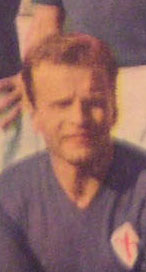
- Vidal in 1954

Personal information
- Full name: Ernesto Servolo Pedro Vidal Cassio
- Date of birth: 15 November 1921
- Place of birth: Buie d'Istria, Kingdom of Italy
- Date of death: 20 February 1974 (aged 52)
- Place of death: Córdoba, Argentina
- Position: Forward

Senior career*
Years	Team	Apps	(Gls)
1936–1940	Sportivo Belgrano		
1941–1944	Rosario Central	52	(16)
1945–1952	Peñarol		
1954–1955	AC Fiorentina		
1955–1956	Pro Patria	1	(0)

International career
1950–1952	Uruguay	8	(2)
Medal record
Representing Uruguay
FIFA World Cup
Winner	1950 Brazil
- * Club domestic league appearances and goals

Ernesto José Vidal Cassio, "El Patrullero", (15 November 1921 – 20 February 1974) was an Italian Uruguayan footballer. He was born Ernesto Servolo Pietro Vidal Cassio in Buie d'Istria, Italy (now Croatia). He was part of the Uruguay national football team that won the 1950 World Cup. He also played club football for C.A. Peñarol Montevideo, Rosario Central in Argentina, and Fiorentina of Italy.
