= Alcides Ghiggia =

Uruguayan footballer (1926–2015)

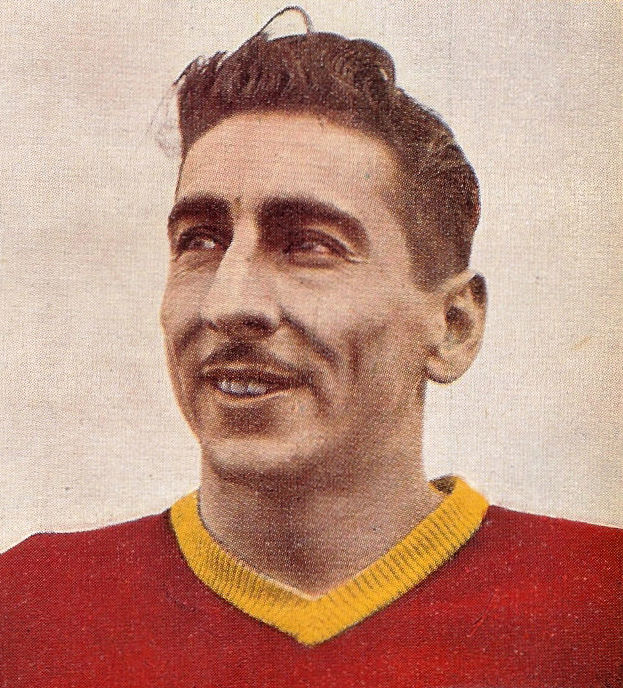
- Ghiggia with A.S. Roma in the mid-1950s

Personal information
- Full name: Alcides Edgardo Ghiggia Pereyra
- Date of birth: 22 December 1926
- Place of birth: Montevideo, Uruguay
- Date of death: 16 July 2015 (aged 88)
- Place of death: Montevideo, Uruguay
- Height: 1.69 m (5 ft 7 in)
- Position: Winger

Senior career*
| Years | Team | Apps | (Gls) |
| 1945–1947 | Sud América | | |
| 1948–1953 | Peñarol | 169 | (26) |
| 1954–1961 | Roma | 201 | (19) |
| 1961–1962 | AC Milan | 4 | (0) |
| 1963–1967 | Danubio | 128 | (12) |
| Total | | 502 | (57) |

International career
| 1950–1952 | Uruguay | 12 | (4) |
| 1957–1959 | Italy | 5 | (1) |

Managerial career
- 1980: Peñarol
Medal record
Representing Uruguay
FIFA World Cup
| Winner | 1950 Brazil |
- * Club domestic league appearances and goals

Alcides Edgardo Ghiggia Pereyra (22 December 1926 – 16 July 2015) was a Uruguayan and Italian footballer who played as a right winger. He achieved lasting fame for his decisive role in the final match of the 1950 World Cup, and at the time of his death exactly 65 years later, he was also the last surviving player of Uruguay's 1950 World Cup squad.

== Career ==
Ghiggia's family was of Ticinese descent, originally from Sonvico. He played for the national sides of both Uruguay and Italy during his career. He also played for Peñarol and Danubio in Uruguay and AS Roma and AC Milan in Italy.

In 1950, Ghiggia, then playing for Uruguay, scored the winning goal against Brazil in the final match of that year's World Cup, advancing down the right wing and taking a low shot which slid right in the space between Brazilian goalkeeper Moacir Barbosa (who was anticipating a cross, like the one that originated Uruguay's earlier equaliser through Juan Alberto Schiaffino) and the left post. Roberto Muylaert compares the black and white film of the goal with Abraham Zapruder's chance images of the assassination of John F. Kennedy in Dallas: he says that the goal and the shot that killed the U.S. president have "the same dramatic pattern ... the same movement ... the same precision of an unstoppable trajectory. They even have the dust in common that was stirred up, here by a rifle and there by Ghiggia's left foot." The match is considered one of the biggest upsets in football history; Ghiggia would later remark that "only three people managed to silence the Maracanã: Frank Sinatra, the Pope, and me." The term Maracanaço (in Portuguese) or Maracanazo (in Spanish), roughly translated as "The Maracanã Smash", became synonymous with the match.

He managed Peñarol in 1980.

On 29 December 2009, Brazil honoured Ghiggia by celebrating his decisive goal in the 1950 World Cup. Ghiggia returned to Maracanã Stadium almost 60 years later for this honour and planted his feet in a mould to take his place alongside greats including Brazil's Pelé, Portugal's Eusébio and Germany's Franz Beckenbauer on the Maracanã's walk of fame. Ghiggia was very emotional and thanked Brazil for the warm reception and recognition he received even when the game is considered the most disappointing in Brazilian football history.

== Later years ==
Ghiggia lived out his last years at his home in Las Piedras, Uruguay. He died on 16 July 2015 in a private hospital in Montevideo at the age of 88. Coincidentally, it was the 65th anniversary of the Maracanazo. At the time of his death, Ghiggia was the oldest living World Cup champion.

Ghiggia was the last surviving member from either the Brazilian or Uruguayan squads involved in the historic 1950 World Cup game.

== Career statistics ==
=== International ===
Appearances and goals by national team and year
| National team | Year | Apps | Goals |
|---|---|---|---|
| Uruguay | 1950 | 7 | 4 |
| Uruguay | 1952 | 5 | 0 |
| Uruguay | Total | 12 | 4 |
| Italy | 1957 | 3 | 1 |
| Italy | 1958 | 1 | 0 |
| Italy | 1959 | 1 | 0 |
| Italy | Total | 5 | 1 |
| Career total | | 17 | 5 |

- Ghiggia's team's score listed first, score column indicates score after each Ghiggia goal.

International goals by Alcides Ghiggia
| No. | Team | Date | Venue | Opponent | Score | Result | Competition | Ref |
|---|---|---|---|---|---|---|---|---|
| 1 | Uruguay | 2 July 1950 | Estádio Independência, Belo Horizonte, Brazil | Bolivia | 8–0 | 8–0 | 1950 FIFA World Cup | |
| 2 | Uruguay | 9 July 1950 | Pacaembu Stadium, São Paulo, Brazil | Spain | 1–0 | 2–2 | 1950 FIFA World Cup | |
| 3 | Uruguay | 13 July 1950 | Pacaembu Stadium, São Paulo, Brazil | Sweden | 1–1 | 3–2 | 1950 FIFA World Cup | |
| 4 | Uruguay | 16 July 1950 | Maracanã Stadium, Rio de Janeiro, Brazil | Brazil | 2–1 | 2–1 | 1950 FIFA World Cup | |
| 5 | Italy | 4 December 1957 | Windsor Park, Belfast, Northern Ireland | Northern Ireland | 1–0 | 2–2 | Friendly | |

== Honours ==
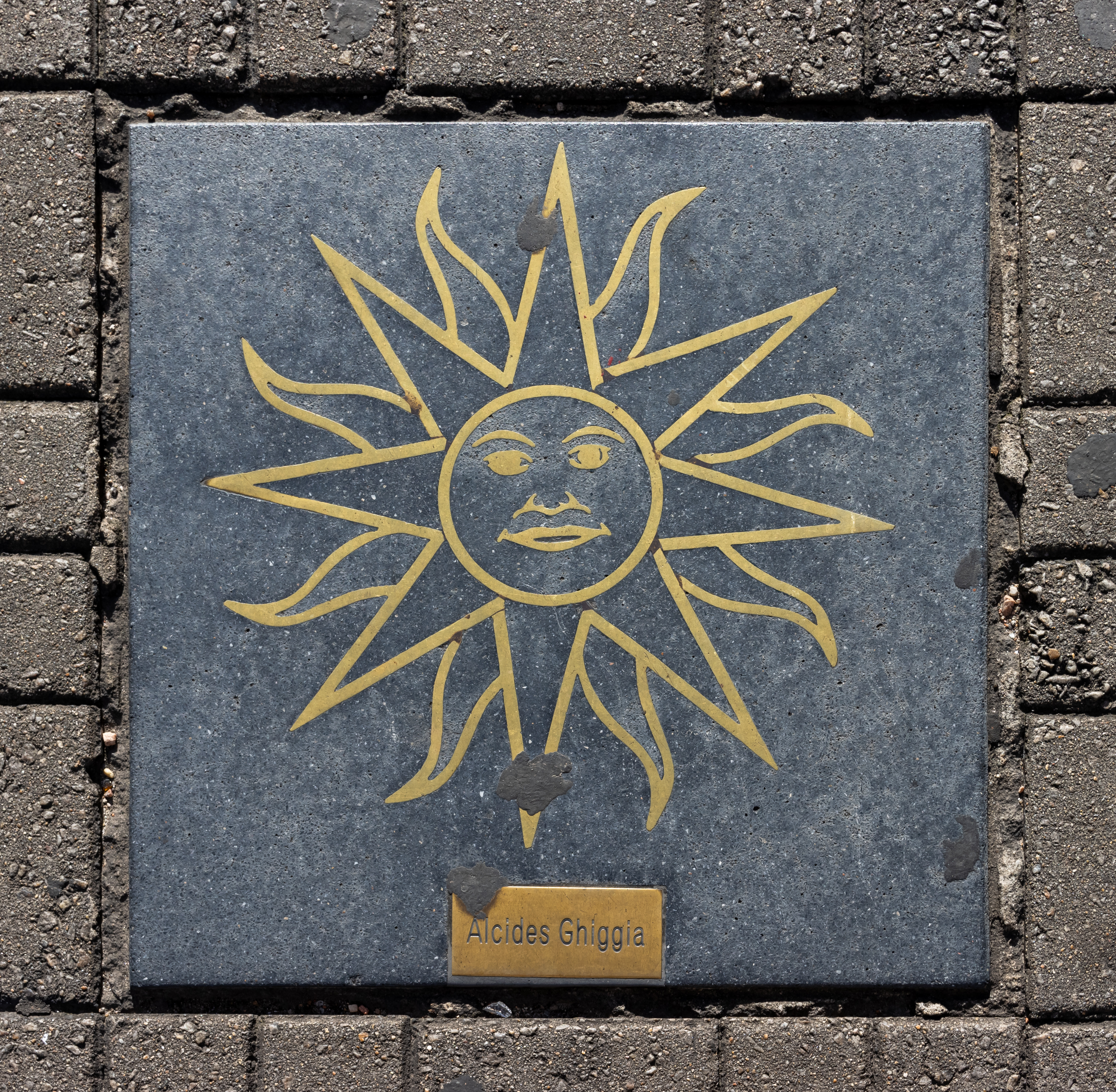
Plaque at the Suns of the Paseo de los Soles, Montevideo, Uruguay

=== Club ===
Peñarol

- Primera División: 1949, 1951

Roma

- Fairs Cup: 1960–61

AC Milan

- Serie A: 1961–62

=== International ===
- FIFA World Cup: 1950

=== Individual ===
- FIFA World Cup All-Star Team: 1950
- Golden Foot: 2006 (as a legend)
- A.S. Roma Hall of Fame: 2014
- IFFHS Uruguayan Men's Dream Team (Team B)

World Cup-winners status
| Preceded by Nílton Santos | Oldest Living Player; 27 November 2013 – 16 July 2015 | Succeeded by Hans Schäfer |
