= 1950 FIFA World Cup squads =

Below are the squads for the 1950 FIFA World Cup final tournament in Brazil. This was the first World Cup where the players' jerseys featured back numbers (allowed in football since 1944), though no teams had fixed numbers for each player. (That would only be compulsory from the next World Cup, in 1954.) Thus, the players are ordered by name.

The only national team player who played his regular league football with a foreign club was George Robledo of Chile, who played in England's Football League First Division.

== Group 1 ==
=== Brazil ===
Head coach: Flávio Costa

No.	Pos.	Player	Date of birth (age)	Caps	Club
	GK	Barbosa	27 March 1921 (aged 29)	13	(Brazil) Vasco da Gama
	DF	Augusto (Captain)	22 October 1920 (aged 29)	12	(Brazil) Vasco da Gama
	DF	Nílton Santos	16 May 1925 (aged 25)	5	(Brazil) Botafogo
	MF	Bauer	21 November 1925 (aged 24)	6	(Brazil) São Paulo
	MF	Danilo	3 December 1920 (aged 29)	15	(Brazil) Vasco da Gama
	MF	Bigode	4 April 1922 (aged 28)	5	(Brazil) Flamengo
	FW	Friaça	20 October 1924 (aged 25)	6	(Brazil) São Paulo
	FW	Zizinho	14 September 1922 (aged 27)	30	(Brazil) Bangu
	FW	Ademir	6 November 1922 (aged 27)	25	(Brazil) Vasco da Gama
	FW	Jair	21 March 1921 (aged 29)	32	(Brazil) Palmeiras
	FW	Chico	7 January 1922 (aged 28)	15	(Brazil) Vasco da Gama
-	FW	Adãozinho	2 April 1923 (aged 27)	2	(Brazil) Internacional
-	FW	Alfredo	1 January 1920 (aged 30)	3	(Brazil) Vasco da Gama
-	FW	Baltazar	14 January 1926 (aged 24)	4	(Brazil) Corinthians
-	GK	Castilho	27 November 1927 (aged 22)	2	(Brazil) Fluminense
-	MF	Ely	14 May 1921 (aged 29)	9	(Brazil) Vasco da Gama
-	DF	Juvenal	27 November 1923 (aged 26)	4	(Brazil) Flamengo
-	FW	Maneca	28 January 1926 (aged 24)	2	(Brazil) Vasco da Gama
-	DF	Nena	27 March 1921 (aged 29)	5	(Brazil) Internacional
-	MF	Noronha	25 September 1918 (aged 31)	15	(Brazil) São Paulo
-	FW	Rodrigues	27 June 1925 (aged 24)	2	(Brazil) Fluminense
-	MF	Rui	2 August 1922 (aged 27)	27	(Brazil) São Paulo

=== Switzerland ===
Head coach: Franco Andreoli

No.	Pos.	Player	Date of birth (age)	Caps	Club
-	FW	Charles Antenen	3 November 1929 (aged 20)	9	(Switzerland) La Chaux-de-Fonds
-	FW	René Bader	7 August 1922 (aged 27)	6	(Switzerland) Basel
-	FW	Walter Beerli	23 July 1928 (aged 21)	1	(Switzerland) Young Boys Bern
-	FW	Alfred Bickel (c)	2 May 1918 (aged 32)	60	(Switzerland) Grasshoppers Club Zurich
-	DF	Roger Bocquet	9 April 1921 (aged 29)	24	(Switzerland) Lausanne-Sport
-	GK	Eugen Corrodi	2 July 1922 (aged 27)	10	(Switzerland) Lugano
-	MF	Oliver Eggimann	28 January 1919 (aged 31)	20	(Switzerland) Servette
-	FW	Jacques Fatton	19 December 1925 (aged 24)	24	(Switzerland) Servette
-	FW	Hans-Peter Friedländer	6 November 1920 (aged 29)	14	(Switzerland) Lausanne-Sport
-	DF	Rudolf Gyger	16 April 1920 (aged 30)	24	(Switzerland) Cantonal Neuchâtel
-	MF	Robert Hasler	1 January 1919 (aged 31)	1	(Switzerland) Lugano
-	GK	Adolphe Hug	23 September 1923 (aged 26)	1	(Switzerland) Urania Genf
-	DF	Willy Kernen	6 August 1929 (aged 20)	0	(Switzerland) La Chaux-de-Fonds
-	FW	Gerhard Lusenti	24 April 1921 (aged 29)	9	(Switzerland) Bellinzona
-	DF	André Neury	3 September 1921 (aged 28)	9	(Switzerland) FC Locarno
-	MF	Roger Quinche	22 July 1922 (aged 27)	3	(Switzerland) FC Bern
-	DF	Kurt Rey	10 December 1923 (aged 26)	1	(Switzerland) SC Young Fellows
-	FW	Walter Schneiter	18 June 1918 (aged 32)	3	(Switzerland) Zurich
-	FW	Hans Siegenthaler	5 February 1923 (aged 27)	1	(Switzerland) SC Young Fellows
-	DF	Willi Steffen	24 May 1923 (aged 27)	24	(Switzerland) Cantonal Neuchâtel
-	GK	Georges Stuber	11 May 1925 (aged 25)	3	(Switzerland) Lausanne-Sport
-	FW	Jean Tamini	9 December 1919 (aged 30)	17	(Switzerland) Servette

Felice Soldini travel with the team but was ineligible to play

=== Yugoslavia ===
Head coach: Milorad Arsenijević

No.	Pos.	Player	Date of birth (age)	Caps	Club
-	MF	Aleksandar Atanacković	29 April 1920 (aged 30)	15	(Socialist Federal Republic of Yugoslavia) Partizan Belgrade
-	GK	Vladimir Beara	2 November 1928 (aged 21)	0	(Socialist Federal Republic of Yugoslavia) Hajduk Split
-	FW	Stjepan Bobek	3 December 1923 (aged 26)	26	(Socialist Federal Republic of Yugoslavia) Partizan Belgrade
-	DF	Božo Broketa	24 December 1921 (aged 28)	3	(Socialist Federal Republic of Yugoslavia) Hajduk Split
-	FW	Željko Čajkovski	5 May 1925 (aged 25)	16	(Socialist Federal Republic of Yugoslavia) Dinamo Zagreb
-	MF	Zlatko Čajkovski	24 November 1923 (aged 26)	25	(Socialist Federal Republic of Yugoslavia) Partizan Belgrade
-	DF	Ratko Čolić	17 March 1918 (aged 32)	6	(Socialist Federal Republic of Yugoslavia) Partizan Belgrade
-	MF	Predrag Đajić	1 May 1922 (aged 28)	5	(Socialist Federal Republic of Yugoslavia) Red Star Belgrade
-	FW	Vladimir Firm	5 June 1923 (aged 27)	3	(Socialist Federal Republic of Yugoslavia) Partizan Belgrade
-	DF	Ivica Horvat	16 July 1926 (aged 23)	13	(Socialist Federal Republic of Yugoslavia) Dinamo Zagreb
-	DF	Miodrag Jovanović	17 January 1922 (aged 28)	18	(Socialist Federal Republic of Yugoslavia) Partizan Belgrade
-	MF	Ervin Katnić	2 September 1921 (aged 28)	0	(Socialist Federal Republic of Yugoslavia) Hajduk Split
-	FW	Prvoslav Mihajlović	13 April 1921 (aged 29)	12	(Socialist Federal Republic of Yugoslavia) Partizan Belgrade
-	FW	Rajko Mitić (c)	6 September 1922 (aged 27)	19	(Socialist Federal Republic of Yugoslavia) Red Star Belgrade
-	GK	Srđan Mrkušić	26 June 1915 (aged 34)	4	(Socialist Federal Republic of Yugoslavia) Red Star Belgrade
-	FW	Tihomir Ognjanov	2 March 1927 (aged 23)	2	(Socialist Federal Republic of Yugoslavia) Red Star Belgrade
-	MF	Bela Palfi	16 February 1923 (aged 27)	1	(Socialist Federal Republic of Yugoslavia) Red Star Belgrade
-	MF	Ivo Radovniković	9 February 1918 (aged 32)	0	(Socialist Federal Republic of Yugoslavia) Hajduk Split
-	DF	Branko Stanković	31 October 1921 (aged 28)	19	(Socialist Federal Republic of Yugoslavia) Red Star Belgrade
-	FW	Kosta Tomašević	25 July 1923 (aged 26)	6	(Socialist Federal Republic of Yugoslavia) Red Star Belgrade
-	FW	Bernard Vukas	1 May 1927 (aged 23)	6	(Socialist Federal Republic of Yugoslavia) Hajduk Split
-	DF	Siniša Zlatković	28 January 1924 (aged 26)	0	(Socialist Federal Republic of Yugoslavia) Naša Krila Zemun

=== Mexico ===
Head coach: Octavio Vial

No.	Pos.	Player	Date of birth (age)	Caps	Club
-	FW	José Luis Borbolla	31 January 1920 (aged 30)	2	(Mexico) Club América
-	GK	Antonio Carbajal	7 June 1929 (aged 21)	0	(Mexico) Real España
-	FW	Horacio Casarín	25 May 1918 (aged 32)	9	(Mexico) Real España
-	GK	Raúl Córdoba	13 March 1924 (aged 26)	4	(Mexico) San Sebastián
-	MF	Samuel Cuburu	20 February 1928 (aged 22)	1	(Mexico) Puebla
-	MF	Antonio Flores	13 July 1923 (aged 26)	5	(Mexico) Atlas
-	DF	Gregorio Gómez	26 June 1924 (aged 25)	3	(Mexico) Guadalajara
-	MF	Carlos Guevara	3 April 1930 (aged 20)	2	(Mexico) Asturias
-	DF	Manuel Gutiérrez	8 April 1920 (aged 30)	0	(Mexico) Club América
-	MF	Francisco Hernández	16 January 1924 (aged 26)	3	(Mexico) Asturias
-	DF	Alfonso Montemayor	28 April 1922 (aged 28)	3	(Mexico) León
-	FW	José Naranjo	19 March 1926 (aged 24)	2	(Mexico) Oro
-	FW	Leonardo Navarro		2	(Mexico) Atlante
-	MF	Mario Ochoa	7 November 1927 (aged 22)	3	(Mexico) Club América
-	MF	Héctor Ortiz	20 December 1928 (aged 21)	5	(Mexico) Marte
-	MF	Mario Pérez	19 February 1927 (aged 23)	2	(Mexico) Marte
-	FW	Max Prieto	28 March 1919 (aged 31)	1	(Mexico) Guadalajara
-	DF	José Antonio Roca	24 May 1928 (aged 22)	5	(Mexico) Necaxa
-	DF	Rodrigo Ruiz	14 April 1923 (aged 27)	3	(Mexico) Guadalajara
-	FW	Carlos Septién	18 January 1923 (aged 27)	5	(Mexico) Real España
-	FW	José Velázquez	12 August 1923 (aged 26)	2	(Mexico) Veracruz
-	DF	Felipe Zetter	3 July 1923 (aged 26)	4	(Mexico) Atlas

== Group 2 ==
=== Spain ===
Head coach: Guillermo Eizaguirre

No.	Pos.	Player	Date of birth (age)	Caps	Club
-	GK	Juan Acuña	11 January 1923 (aged 27)	1	(Spain) Deportivo La Coruña
-	DF	Gabriel Alonso	9 November 1923 (aged 26)	4	(Spain) Celta Vigo
-	DF	Francisco Antúnez	1 November 1922 (aged 27)	2	(Spain) Sevilla
-	DF	Vicente Asensi	28 January 1919 (aged 31)	5	(Spain) Valencia
-	FW	Estanislau Basora	18 November 1926 (aged 23)	4	(Spain) Barcelona
-	FW	César	29 June 1920 (aged 29)	8	(Spain) Barcelona
-	FW	Agustín Gaínza	28 May 1922 (aged 28)	14	(Spain) Atlético Bilbao
-	DF	Josep Gonzalvo	16 January 1920 (aged 30)	3	(Spain) Barcelona
-	MF	Marià Gonzalvo	22 March 1922 (aged 28)	8	(Spain) Barcelona
-	FW	Rosendo Hernández	1 March 1921 (aged 29)	2	(Spain) Espanyol
-	FW	Silvestre Igoa	5 September 1920 (aged 29)	5	(Spain) Valencia
-	GK	Ignacio Eizaguirre (Captain)	7 November 1920 (aged 29)	14	(Spain) Valencia
-	FW	José Juncosa	2 February 1922 (aged 28)	1	(Spain) Atlético Madrid
-	DF	Rafael Lesmes	9 November 1926 (aged 23)	0	(Spain) Valladolid
-	MF	Luis Molowny	12 May 1925 (aged 25)	2	(Spain) Real Madrid
-	MF	Nando	1 February 1921 (aged 29)	5	(Spain) Atlético Bilbao
-	MF	José Luis Panizo	12 January 1922 (aged 28)	6	(Spain) Atlético Bilbao
-	DF	José Parra	28 August 1925 (aged 24)	1	(Spain) Espanyol
-	MF	Antonio Puchades	4 June 1925 (aged 25)	6	(Spain) Valencia
-	GK	Antoni Ramallets	4 June 1924 (aged 26)	0	(Spain) Barcelona
-	MF	Alfonso Silva	19 March 1926 (aged 24)	3	(Spain) Atlético Madrid
-	FW	Telmo Zarra	20 January 1921 (aged 29)	11	(Spain) Atlético Bilbao

=== England ===
Head coach: Walter Winterbottom

No.	Pos.	Player	Date of birth (age)	Caps	Club
-	DF	John Aston	3 September 1921 (aged 28)	14	(England) Manchester United
-	FW	Eddie Baily	6 August 1925 (aged 24)	0	(England) Tottenham Hotspur
-	FW	Roy Bentley	17 May 1924 (aged 26)	4	(England) Chelsea
-	MF	Henry Cockburn	14 September 1921 (aged 28)	10	(England) Manchester United
-	MF	Jimmy Dickinson	25 April 1925 (aged 25)	7	(England) Portsmouth
-	GK	Ted Ditchburn	24 October 1921 (aged 28)	2	(England) Tottenham Hotspur
-	DF	Bill Eckersley	16 July 1925 (aged 24)	0	(England) Blackburn Rovers
-	FW	Tom Finney	5 April 1922 (aged 28)	25	(England) Preston North End
-	DF	Laurie Hughes	2 March 1924 (aged 26)	0	(England) Liverpool
-	FW	Wilf Mannion	16 May 1918 (aged 32)	19	(England) Middlesbrough
-	FW	Stanley Matthews	1 February 1915 (aged 35)	30	(England) Blackpool
-	FW	Jackie Milburn	11 May 1924 (aged 26)	7	(England) Newcastle United
-	FW	Stan Mortensen	26 May 1921 (aged 29)	18	(England) Blackpool
-	FW	Jimmy Mullen	6 January 1923 (aged 27)	4	(England) Wolverhampton Wanderers
-	MF	Bill Nicholson	26 January 1919 (aged 31)	0	(England) Tottenham Hotspur
-	DF	Alf Ramsey	22 January 1920 (aged 30)	5	(England) Tottenham Hotspur
-	DF	Laurie Scott	23 April 1917 (aged 33)	17	(England) Arsenal
-	DF	Jim Taylor	5 November 1917 (aged 32)	0	(England) Fulham
-	MF	Willie Watson	7 March 1920 (aged 30)	2	(England) Sunderland
-	GK	Bert Williams	31 January 1920 (aged 30)	7	(England) Wolverhampton Wanderers
-	MF	Billy Wright (c)	6 February 1924 (aged 26)	29	(England) Wolverhampton Wanderers

=== Chile ===
Head coach: Alberto Buccicardi

No.	Pos.	Player	Date of birth (age)	Caps	Club
-	DF	Manuel Álvarez	23 May 1928 (aged 22)	3	(Chile) Universidad Católica
-	MF	Miguel Busquets	15 October 1920 (aged 29)	15	Universidad de Chile
-	MF	Fernando Campos	15 October 1923 (aged 26)	5	(Chile) Colo-Colo
-	MF	Hernán Carvallo	19 August 1922 (aged 27)	5	(Chile) Universidad Católica
-	FW	Atilio Cremaschi	8 March 1923 (aged 27)	12	(Chile) Unión Española
-	FW	Guillermo Díaz	29 December 1930 (aged 19)	4	(Chile) Santiago Wanderers
-	DF	Arturo Farías	1 September 1927 (aged 22)	4	(Chile) Colo-Colo
-	DF	Miguel Flores	11 October 1920 (aged 29)	3	Universidad de Chile
-	FW	Carlos Ibáñez	28 November 1930 (aged 19)	0	(Chile) Magallanes
-	FW	Raimundo Infante	2 February 1928 (aged 22)	13	(Chile) Universidad Católica
-	GK	Sergio Livingstone	26 March 1920 (aged 30)	30	(Chile) Universidad Católica
-	DF	Manuel Machuca	6 June 1924 (aged 26)	18	(Chile) Colo-Colo
-	FW	Luis Mayanés	15 January 1925 (aged 25)	0	(Chile) Universidad Católica
-	FW	Manuel Muñoz	28 April 1928 (aged 22)	1	(Chile) Colo-Colo
-	FW	Andrés Prieto	19 December 1928 (aged 21)	9	(Chile) Universidad Católica
-	GK	René Quitral	15 September 1924 (aged 25)	1	(Chile) Santiago Wanderers
-	FW	Fernando Riera	27 June 1920 (aged 29)	16	(Chile) Universidad Católica
-	FW	George Robledo	14 April 1926 (aged 24)	0	(England) Newcastle United
-	MF	Carlos Rojas	2 October 1928 (aged 21)	5	(Chile) Unión Española
-	DF	Fernando Roldán	15 October 1921 (aged 28)	0	(Chile) Universidad Católica
-	MF	Osvaldo Saez	13 August 1923 (aged 26)	12	(Chile) Colo-Colo
-	DF	Francisco Urroz	14 December 1920 (aged 29)	11	(Chile) Colo-Colo

=== United States ===
Head coach: William Jeffrey

No.	Pos.	Player	Date of birth (age)	Caps	Club
-	DF	Robert Annis	5 September 1928 (aged 21)	1	(United States) St. Louis Simpkins-Ford
-	MF	Walter Bahr	1 April 1927 (aged 23)	7	(United States) Philadelphia Nationals
-	GK	Frank Borghi	9 April 1925 (aged 25)	4	(United States) St. Louis Simpkins-Ford
-	MF	Charlie Colombo	20 July 1920 (aged 29)	7	(United States) St. Louis Simpkins-Ford
-	MF	Geoff Coombes	23 April 1919 (aged 31)	0	(United States) Chicago Vikings
-	FW	Robert Craddock	5 September 1923 (aged 26)	0	(United States) Pittsburgh Harmarville S.C.
-	FW	Nicholas DiOrio	4 February 1921 (aged 29)	0	(United States) Pittsburgh Harmarville S.C.
-	FW	Joe Gaetjens	19 March 1924 (aged 26)	0	(United States) Brookhattan
-	GK	Gino Gardassanich	26 November 1922 (aged 27)	0	(United States) Chicago Slovak
-	DF	Harry Keough	15 November 1927 (aged 22)	3	(United States) St. Louis McMahon
-	DF	Joe Maca	28 September 1920 (aged 29)	0	(United States) Brooklyn Hispano
-	MF	Ed McIlvenny	21 October 1924 (aged 25)	0	(United States) Philadelphia Nationals
-	FW	Benny McLaughlin	10 April 1928 (aged 22)	0	(United States) Philadelphia Nationals
-	FW	Gino Pariani	21 February 1928 (aged 22)	2	(United States) St. Louis Simpkins-Ford
-	FW	Ed Souza	22 September 1921 (aged 28)	4	(United States) Ponta Delgada S.C.
-	FW	John Souza	12 July 1920 (aged 29)	9	(United States) Ponta Delgada S.C.
-	FW	Frank Wallace	15 July 1922 (aged 27)	4	(United States) St. Louis Simpkins-Ford
-	FW	Adam Wolanin	13 November 1919 (aged 30)	0	(United States) Chicago Eagles

Although Benny McLaughlin registered to the official list, remained on standby in the U.S.

== Group 3 ==
=== Sweden ===
Head coach: (England) George Raynor

No.	Pos.	Player	Date of birth (age)	Caps	Club
-	MF	Sune Andersson	22 February 1921 (aged 29)	23	(Sweden) AIK
-	MF	Ingvar Gärd	6 October 1921 (aged 28)	1	(Sweden) Malmö FF
-	FW	Hasse Jeppson	10 May 1925 (aged 25)	8	(Sweden) Djurgårdens IF
-	DF	Gunnar Johansson	29 February 1924 (aged 26)	0	(Sweden) GAIS
-	FW	Egon Jönsson	8 October 1921 (aged 28)	7	(Sweden) Malmö FF
-	GK	Torsten Lindberg	14 April 1917 (aged 33)	18	(Sweden) IFK Norrköping
*	DF	Arne Månsson	11 November 1925 (aged 24)	1	(Sweden) Malmö FF
-	FW	Bror Mellberg	9 December 1923 (aged 26)	1	(Sweden) AIK
-	DF	Erik Nilsson (Captain)	6 August 1916 (aged 33)	28	(Sweden) Malmö FF
-	FW	Stellan Nilsson	28 May 1922 (aged 28)	15	(Sweden) Malmö FF
-	MF	Knut Nordahl	13 January 1920 (aged 30)	23	(Sweden) IFK Norrköping
-	FW	Karl-Erik Palmér	17 April 1929 (aged 21)	5	(Sweden) Malmö FF
-	FW	Ingvar Rydell	7 May 1922 (aged 28)	2	(Sweden) Malmö FF
-	DF	Lennart Samuelsson	7 July 1924 (aged 25)	1	(Sweden) IF Elfsborg Borås
-	FW	Lennart Skoglund	24 December 1929 (aged 20)	1	(Sweden) AIK
-	FW	Stig Sundqvist	19 July 1922 (aged 27)	6	(Sweden) IFK Norrköping
-	GK	Kalle Svensson	11 November 1925 (aged 24)	4	(Sweden) Helsingborgs IF
-	FW	Kurt Svensson	15 April 1927 (aged 23)	0	(Sweden) IS Halmia
-	GK	Tore Svensson	6 December 1927 (aged 22)	0	(Sweden) IF Elfsborg Borås
-	FW	Börje Tapper	20 May 1922 (aged 28)	4	(Sweden) Malmö FF
-	MF	Olle Åhlund	22 August 1920 (aged 29)	15	(Sweden) Degerfors IF

=== Italy ===
Head coach: Ferruccio Novo

No.	Pos.	Player	Date of birth (age)	Caps	Club
-	FW	Amedeo Amadei	26 July 1921 (aged 28)	6	(Italy) Internazionale
-	DF	Carlo Annovazzi	24 May 1925 (aged 25)	10	(Italy) Milan
-	DF	Ivano Blason	24 May 1923 (aged 27)	0	(Italy) Triestina
-	FW	Giampiero Boniperti	4 July 1928 (aged 21)	6	(Italy) Juventus
-	FW	Aldo Campatelli	7 April 1919 (aged 31)	6	(Italy) Internazionale
-	FW	Gino Cappello	2 June 1920 (aged 30)	3	(Italy) Bologna
-	FW	Emilio Caprile	30 September 1928 (aged 21)	2	(Italy) Atalanta
-	FW	Riccardo Carapellese (Captain)	1 July 1922 (aged 27)	11	(Italy) Torino
-	GK	Giuseppe Casari	10 April 1922 (aged 28)	2	(Italy) Atalanta
-	DF	Osvaldo Fattori	22 June 1922 (aged 28)	3	(Italy) Internazionale
-	DF	Zeffiro Furiassi	19 January 1923 (aged 27)	0	(Italy) Lazio
-	DF	Attilio Giovannini	30 July 1924 (aged 25)	4	(Italy) Internazionale
-	FW	Benito Lorenzi	20 December 1925 (aged 24)	5	(Italy) Internazionale
-	MF	Augusto Magli	9 March 1923 (aged 27)	0	(Italy) Fiorentina
-	MF	Giacomo Mari	17 October 1924 (aged 25)	3	(Italy) Juventus
-	GK	Giuseppe Moro	16 January 1921 (aged 29)	2	(Italy) Torino
-	FW	Ermes Muccinelli	28 July 1927 (aged 22)	2	(Italy) Juventus
-	FW	Egisto Pandolfini	19 February 1926 (aged 24)	0	(Italy) Fiorentina
-	MF	Carlo Parola	20 September 1921 (aged 28)	9	(Italy) Juventus
-	MF	Leandro Remondini	17 November 1917 (aged 32)	0	(Italy) Lazio
-	GK	Lucidio Sentimenti	1 July 1920 (aged 29)	7	(Italy) Lazio
-	MF	Omero Tognon	3 March 1924 (aged 26)	4	(Italy) Milan

=== Paraguay ===
Head coach: Manuel Fleitas Solich

No.	Pos.	Player	Date of birth (age)	Caps	Club
-	FW	Enrique Avalos	1922		(Paraguay) Cerro Porteño
-	FW	Marcial Avalos	5 December 1921 (aged 28)		(Paraguay) Cerro Porteño
-	MF	Melanio Baez			(Paraguay) Nacional
-	FW	Ángel Berni	9 January 1931 (aged 19)		(Paraguay) Sportivo Luqueño
-	DF	Antonio Cabrera	1 January 1928 (aged 22)		(Paraguay) Libertad
-	FW	Lorenzo Calonga	28 August 1929 (aged 20)		(Paraguay) Guaraní
-	FW	Juan Cañete	27 July 1929 (aged 20)		(Paraguay) Presidente Hayes
-	MF	Castor Cantero	12 January 1918 (aged 32)		(Paraguay) Olimpia
-	GK	Pablo Centurión	2 February 1929 (aged 21)		(Paraguay) Cerro Porteño
-	DF	Casiano Céspedes	30 November 1923 (aged 26)		(Paraguay) Olimpia
-	DF	Manuel Gavilán	30 November 1920 (aged 29)		(Paraguay) Libertad
-	DF	Alberto González	1922		(Paraguay) Olimpia
-	MF	Armando González			(Paraguay) Guaraní
-	MF	Victoriano Leguizamón	23 March 1922 (aged 28)		(Paraguay) Olimpia
-	FW	Atilio López	5 February 1925 (aged 25)		(Paraguay) Guarani
-	FW	César López Fretes	21 March 1923 (aged 27)		(Paraguay) Olimpia
-	FW	Hilarión Osorio	21 October 1928 (aged 21)		(Paraguay) Sportivo Luqueño
-	DF	Elioro Paredes	19 June 1921 (aged 29)		(Paraguay) Sportivo Luqueño
-	FW	Darío Jara Saguier	27 January 1930 (aged 20)		(Paraguay) Cerro Porteño
-	FW	Francisco Sosa	4 October 1917 (aged 32)		(Paraguay) Cerro Porteño
-	FW	Leongino Unzaim	16 May 1925 (aged 25)		(Paraguay) Olimpia
-	GK	Marcelino Vargas	1921		(Paraguay) Libertad

== Group 4 ==
=== Uruguay ===
Head coach: Juan López

No.	Pos.	Player	Date of birth (age)	Caps	Club
-	FW	Julio César Britos	18 May 1926 (aged 24)	10	(Uruguay) Peñarol
-	FW	Juan Burgueño	4 February 1923 (aged 27)	4	(Uruguay) Danubio
4	DF	Schubert Gambetta	14 April 1920 (aged 30)	34	(Uruguay) Nacional
7	FW	Alcides Ghiggia	22 December 1926 (aged 23)	3	(Uruguay) Peñarol
4	DF	Juan Carlos González	22 August 1924 (aged 25)	3	(Uruguay) Peñarol
2	DF	Matías González	6 August 1925 (aged 24)	13	(Uruguay) Cerro
-	DF	William Martínez	13 January 1928 (aged 22)	3	(Uruguay) Rampla Juniors
1	GK	Roque Máspoli	12 October 1917 (aged 32)	20	(Uruguay) Peñarol
9	FW	Oscar Míguez	5 December 1927 (aged 22)	4	(Uruguay) Peñarol
11	FW	Rubén Morán	6 August 1930 (aged 19)	2	(Uruguay) Cerro
-	MF	Washington Ortuño	13 May 1928 (aged 22)	0	(Uruguay) Peñarol
1	GK	Aníbal Paz	21 May 1917 (aged 33)	23	(Uruguay) Nacional
8	FW	Julio Pérez	19 June 1926 (aged 24)	7	(Uruguay) River Plate
-	MF	Rodolfo Pini	12 November 1926 (aged 23)	6	(Uruguay) Nacional
-	FW	Luis Rijo	28 September 1927 (aged 22)	0	(Uruguay) Central Español
6	MF	Víctor Rodríguez Andrade	2 May 1927 (aged 23)	9	(Uruguay) Central Español
-	FW	Carlos Romero	7 September 1927 (aged 22)	4	(Uruguay) Danubio
10	FW	Juan Alberto Schiaffino	28 July 1925 (aged 24)	7	(Uruguay) Peñarol
3	DF	Eusebio Tejera	6 January 1922 (aged 28)	24	(Uruguay) Nacional
5	MF	Obdulio Varela (Captain)	20 September 1917 (aged 32)	34	(Uruguay) Peñarol
11	FW	Ernesto Vidal	15 November 1921 (aged 28)	0	(Uruguay) Peñarol
-	DF	Héctor Vilches	14 February 1926 (aged 24)	5	(Uruguay) Cerro

=== Bolivia ===
Head coach: (Italy) Mario Pretto

No.	Pos.	Player	Date of birth (age)	Caps	Club
-	DF	Alberto Achá	18 February 1917 (aged 33)	23	(Bolivia) The Strongest
-	FW	Víctor Celestino Algarañaz	6 April 1926 (aged 24)	8	(Bolivia) Litoral de Cochabamba
-	MF	Alberto Aparicio	11 November 1923 (aged 26)	0	(Bolivia) Ferroviario La Paz
-	MF	Duberty Aráoz	21 December 1920 (aged 29)	10	(Bolivia) Litoral de Cochabamba
-	GK	Vicente Arraya	25 January 1921 (aged 29)	26	(Bolivia) Ferroviario La Paz
-	FW	Víctor Brown	7 March 1927 (aged 23)	2	(Bolivia) Club Bolívar
-	DF	José Bustamante	5 March 1922 (aged 28)	31	(Bolivia) Litoral de Cochabamba
-	MF	René Cabrera	21 October 1925 (aged 24)	8	(Bolivia) Lloyd Aéreo Boliviano
-	FW	Roberto Capparelli	18 November 1923 (aged 26)	0	(Bolivia) The Strongest
-	MF	Leonardo Ferrel	7 July 1923 (aged 26)	18	(Bolivia) The Strongest
-	FW	Benedicto Godoy Véizaga	28 July 1924 (aged 25)	9	(Bolivia) Ferroviario La Paz
-	DF	Antonio Greco	17 September 1923 (aged 26)	0	(Bolivia) Litoral de Cochabamba
-	FW	Juan Guerra	13 April 1927 (aged 23)	9	(Bolivia) Ferroviario La Paz
-	FW	Benigno Gutiérrez	1 September 1925 (aged 24)	15	(Bolivia) Litoral de Cochabamba
-	GK	Eduardo Gutiérrez	17 January 1925 (aged 25)	12	(Bolivia) CD Ingavi
-	FW	Benjamin Maldonado	4 January 1928 (aged 22)	4	(Bolivia) San Jose de Oruro
-	FW	Mario Mena	28 February 1927 (aged 23)	9	(Bolivia) Club Bolívar
-	MF	Humberto Saavedra	3 August 1923 (aged 26)	0	(Bolivia) The Strongest
-	FW	Víctor Agustín Ugarte	5 May 1926 (aged 24)	16	(Bolivia) Club Bolívar
-	MF	Antonio Valencia	10 May 1925 (aged 25)	9	(Bolivia) Club Bolívar

== Notes ==
Each national team had to submit a squad of 22 players. Each squad included two goalkeepers, except Switzerland, Spain, Sweden and Italy who called three. George Robledo of Newcastle United was the only player to play for a club outside of his country in the tournament.

== Coaches representation by country ==
Nº	Country	Coaches
2	England	George Raynor (Sweden), Walter Winterbottom
2	Italy	Ferruccio Novo, Mario Pretto (Bolivia)
1	Brazil	Flávio Costa
1	Chile	Alberto Buccicardi
1	Mexico	Octavio Vial
1	Paraguay	Manuel Fleitas Solich
1	Spain	Guillermo Eizaguirre
1	Switzerland	Franco Andreoli
1	United States	William Jeffrey
1	Uruguay	Juan López
1	(Socialist Federal Republic of Yugoslavia) Yugoslavia	Milorad Arsenijević
