= 1950 FIFA World Cup Group 1 =

Group 1 of the 1950 FIFA World Cup took place from 24 June to 2 July 1950. The group consisted of Brazil, Mexico, Yugoslavia, and Switzerland. The group winners advanced to the final round.

== Standings ==
Pos	Team	Pld	W	D	L	GF	GA	GD	Pts	Qualification
1	Brazil	3	2	1	0	8	2	+6	5	Advance to final round
2	Yugoslavia	3	2	0	1	7	3	+4	4	
3	Switzerland	3	1	1	1	4	6	−2	3	
4	Mexico	3	0	0	3	2	10	−8	0	

Source: FIFA
Rules for classification: Tiebreakers

== Matches ==
All times listed are local time.

=== Brazil vs Mexico ===
24 June 1950
15:00 BRT (UTC-3)

Brazil	4–0	Mexico
Ademir 30', 79'; Jair 65'; Baltazar 71'

Estádio do Maracanã, Rio de Janeiro
Attendance: 81,649
Referee: George Reader (England)

Brazil
Mexico

GK	1	Barbosa
RB	2	Augusto (c)
CB	3	Juvenal
LB	6	Bigode
RH	4	Ely
LH	5	Danilo
OR	7	Friaça
IR	8	Maneca
CF	9	Baltazar
IL	10	Ademir
OL	11	Jair
Manager:
Flávio Costa

GK	1	Antonio Carbajal
RB	2	Felipe Zetter
LB	3	Alfonso Montemayor (c)
RH	4	Rodrigo Ruiz
CH	5	Mario Ochoa
LH	6	José Antonio Roca
OR	7	Carlos Septién
IR	8	Héctor Ortiz
CF	9	Horacio Casarín
IL	10	Mario Pérez
OL	11	José Velázquez
Manager:
Octavio Vial

=== Yugoslavia vs Switzerland ===
25 June 1950
15:00 BRT (UTC-3)

Yugoslavia	3–0	Switzerland
Mitić 59'; Tomašević 70'; Ognjanov 84'

Estádio Independência, Belo Horizonte
Attendance: 7,336
Referee: Giovanni Galeati (Italy)

Yugoslavia
Switzerland

GK	1	Srđan Mrkušić
RB	2	Ivica Horvat
LB	3	Branko Stanković
RH	4	Zlatko Čajkovski
CH	5	Miodrag Jovanović
LH	6	Predrag Đajić
OR	7	Tihomir Ognjanov
IR	8	Rajko Mitić (c)
CF	9	Kosta Tomašević
IL	10	Stjepan Bobek
OL	11	Bernard Vukas
Manager:
Milorad Arsenijević

GK	1	Georges Stuber
RB	2	André Neury
LB	3	Roger Bocquet
RH	4	Gerhard Lusenti
CH	5	Oliver Eggimann
LH	6	Roger Quinche
OR	7	Alfred Bickel (c)
IR	8	Charles Antenen
CF	9	Jean Tamini
IL	10	René Bader
OL	11	Jacques Fatton
Manager:
Franco Andreoli

=== Brazil vs Switzerland ===
28 June 1950
15:00 BRT (UTC-3)

Brazil	2–2	Switzerland
Alfredo 3'; Baltazar 32'		Fatton 17', 88'

Estádio do Pacaembu, São Paulo
Attendance: 42,032
Referee: Ramón Azón Romá (Spain)

Brazil
Switzerland

GK	1	Barbosa
RB	2	Augusto (c)
CB	3	Juvenal
LB	6	Noronha
RH	4	Bauer
LH	5	Rui
OR	7	Alfredo
IR	8	Maneca
CF	9	Baltazar
IL	10	Ademir
OL	11	Friaça
Manager:
Flávio Costa

GK	1	Georges Stuber
RB	2	André Neury
LB	3	Roger Bocquet
RH	4	Gerhard Lusenti
CH	5	Oliver Eggimann
LH	6	Roger Quinche
OR	7	Jean Tamini
IR	8	Alfred Bickel (c)
CF	9	Hans-Peter Friedländer
IL	10	René Bader
OL	11	Jacques Fatton
Manager:
Franco Andreoli

=== Yugoslavia vs Mexico ===
28 June 1950
15:00 BRT (UTC-3)

Yugoslavia	4–1	Mexico
Bobek 20'; Ž. Čajkovski 23', 51'; Tomašević 81'		Ortiz 89' (pen.)

Estádio dos Eucaliptos, Porto Alegre
Attendance: 11,078
Referee: Reginald Leafe (England)

Yugoslavia
Mexico

GK	1	Srđan Mrkušić
RB	2	Ivica Horvat
LB	3	Branko Stanković
RH	4	Zlatko Čajkovski
CH	5	Miodrag Jovanović
LH	6	Predrag Đajić
OR	7	Prvoslav Mihajlović
IR	8	Rajko Mitić (c)
CF	9	Kosta Tomašević
IL	10	Stjepan Bobek
OL	11	Željko Čajkovski
Manager:
Milorad Arsenijević

GK	1	Antonio Carbajal
RB	2	Manuel Gutiérrez
CB	3	Samuel Cuburu
LB	4	Gregorio Gómez
RH	5	José Antonio Roca
LH	6	Héctor Ortiz
OR	7	Carlos Septién
IR	8	José Naranjo
CF	9	Horacio Casarín (c)
IL	10	José Luis Borbolla
OL	11	José Velázquez
Manager:
Octavio Vial

=== Brazil vs Yugoslavia ===
1 July 1950
15:00 BRT (UTC-3)

Brazil	2–0	Yugoslavia
Ademir 4'; Zizinho 69'

Estádio do Maracanã, Rio de Janeiro
Attendance: 142,429
Referee: Benjamin Griffiths (Wales)

Brazil
Yugoslavia

GK	1	Barbosa
RB	2	Augusto (c)
CB	3	Juvenal
LB	6	Bigode
RH	4	Bauer
LH	5	Danilo
OR	7	Maneca
IR	8	Zizinho
CF	9	Ademir
IL	10	Jair
OL	11	Chico
Manager:
Flávio Costa

GK	1	Srđan Mrkušić
RB	2	Ivica Horvat
LB	3	Branko Stanković
RH	4	Zlatko Čajkovski (c)
CH	5	Miodrag Jovanović
LH	6	Predrag Đajić
OR	7	Bernard Vukas
IR	8	Rajko Mitić
CF	9	Kosta Tomašević
IL	10	Stjepan Bobek
OL	11	Željko Čajkovski
Manager:
Milorad Arsenijević

=== Switzerland vs Mexico ===
For this match, Mexico wore the shirts provided by EC Cruzeiro.

2 July 1950
15:40 BRT (UTC-3)

Switzerland	2–1	Mexico
Bader 10'; Antenen 44'		Casarín 89'

Estádio dos Eucaliptos, Porto Alegre
Attendance: 3,580
Referee: Ivan Eklind (Sweden)

Switzerland
Mexico

GK	1	Adolphe Hug
RB	2	André Neury
LB	3	Roger Bocquet
RH	4	Gerhard Lusenti
CH	5	Oliver Eggimann
LH	6	Roger Quinche
OR	7	Jean Tamini
IR	8	Charles Antenen
CF	9	Hans-Peter Friedländer (c)
IL	10	René Bader
OL	11	Jacques Fatton
Manager:
Franco Andreoli

GK	1	Antonio Carbajal
RB	2	Manuel Gutiérrez
CB	3	Mario Ochoa
LB	4	Gregorio Gómez
RH	5	José Antonio Roca
LH	6	Héctor Ortiz
OR	7	Antonio Flores
IR	8	José Naranjo
CF	9	Horacio Casarín (c)
IL	10	José Luis Borbolla
OL	11	José Velázquez
Manager:
Octavio Vial

== See also ==
- Brazil at the FIFA World Cup
- Mexico at the FIFA World Cup
- Switzerland at the FIFA World Cup
- Yugoslavia at the FIFA World Cup
