= Corrodi =

Corrodi is a surname. Notable people with the surname include:

- Eugen Corrodi (1922–1975), Swiss footballer
- Hermann David Salomon Corrodi (1844–1905), Italian painter
- Salomon Corrodi (1810–1892), Swiss-Italian painter
