= Austria v Switzerland (1954 FIFA World Cup) =

1954 FIFA World Cup Quarter-final
The heat battle of Lausanne (Hitzeschlacht von Lausanne)
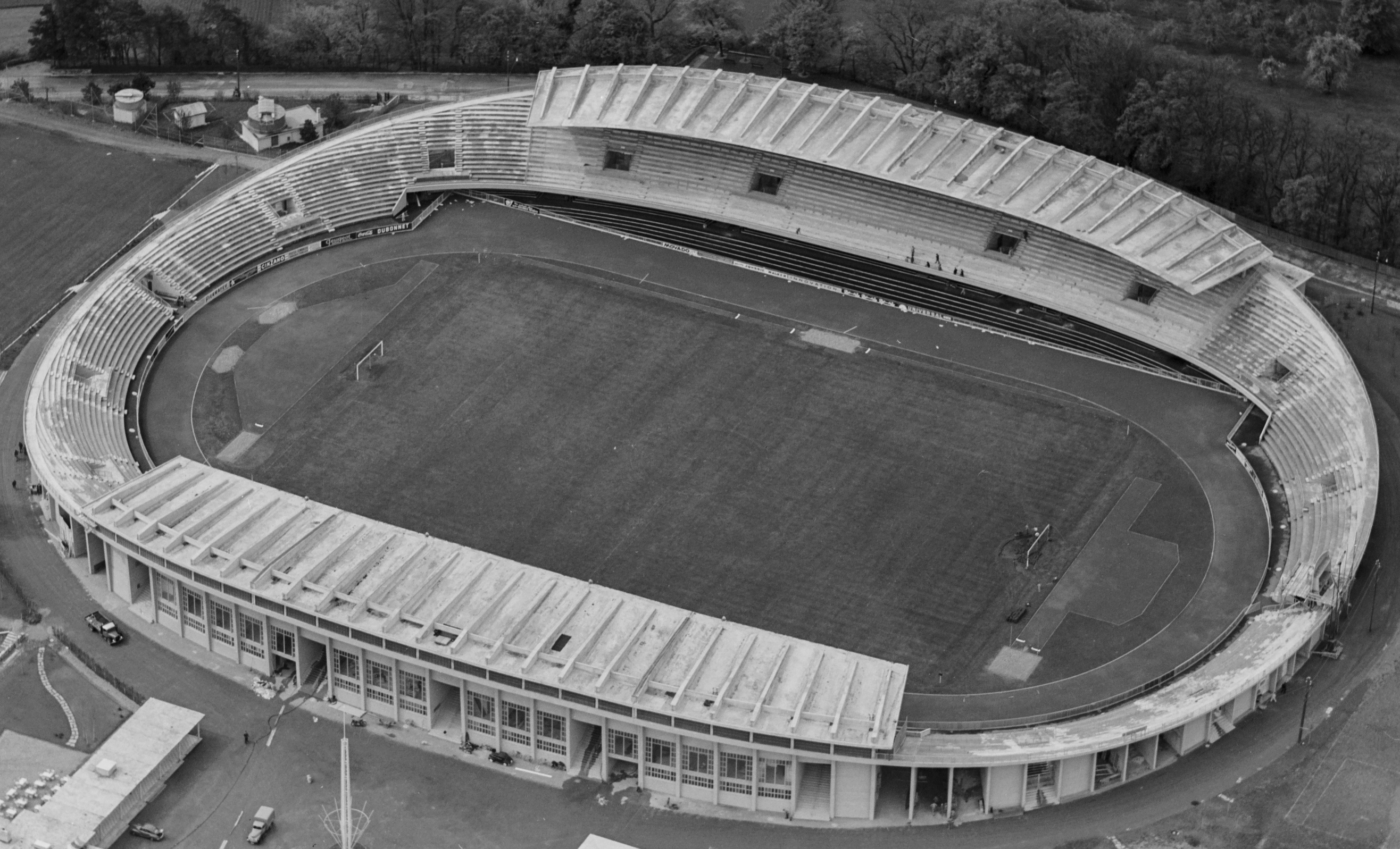
| Austria | Switzerland |
| (Austria) | (Switzerland) |
| 7 | 5 |
- Date: 26 June 1954
- Venue: La Pontaise, Lausanne
- Referee: Charlie Faultless (Scotland)
- Attendance: 35,000
- Weather: Extreme heat (40 °C (104 °F))

Austria 7–5 Switzerland was a football match played on 26 June 1954, in a quarter-final match of the 1954 FIFA World Cup, where Austria beat Switzerland in Lausanne, Switzerland. The 12 goals scored in the match set a men’s World Cup record, unequalled to date, for the highest scoring match ever. The match is known by its German name, Hitzeschlacht von Lausanne (roughly translated to "The heat battle of Lausanne"), due to the high temperature that it was played under–40 °C (104 °F).

== Match ==
=== Summary ===
Switzerland, the tournament hosts, took a notable lead early on. In four minutes, the Swiss scored three goals: forward Robert Ballaman opened the score at the 16th minute, followed quickly by two goals by Josef Hügi. Austria then became the first team in World Cup history to recover from a 3–0 deficit, scoring 5 goals in the remainder of the first half; Theodor Wagner initiated the Austrian response at the 25th minute; forward Alfred Körner (Note: According to the official match report Archived 12 December 2006 at the Wayback Machine by FIFA, Robert Körner scored the second and fifth Austrian goals, but most sources not related to FIFA, including RSSSF("World Cup 1954 finals". Archived from the original on 3 January 2007.), (in German) SportZeitung ("Archived copy". Archived from the original on 29 September 2007.), ESPN( Archived 14 February 2012 at the Wayback Machine) and the BBC(), state that Robert's younger brother, Alfred, scored those goals. The RSSSF page also states that Alfred Körner took and missed a penalty kick in the 42nd minute.) drew the score to 2–3 one minute later, and another minute later Wagner equalized to 3–3. Austria had tied the score in three minutes. In 11 minutes, between the 16th and the 27th minutes, six goals were scored, three by each team. At the 32nd minute, Ernst Ocwirk gave Austria the lead; Körner added his second, making the score 5–3. Ballaman scored again for Switzerland at the 39th minute. The first half thus ended 5–4 in favour of Austria, being the highest scoring half in World Cup history, even after inside left Körner had missed a penalty kick in the 42nd minute.

Nine minutes into the second half, Wagner put Austria up 6–4 with his third goal, recording the seventh hat-trick of the 1954 World Cup (See List of World Cup hat-tricks). Hügi would then emulate the feat, scoring his third at the 58th minute. Switzerland was not able to equalize, and Erich Probst made it 7–5 to end the scoring at the 76th minute. According to FIFA, the extreme heat adversely affected Switzerland after they led the match 3–0 at one point. Other sources add that at first, Switzerland had been able to take advantage of the temperature, when Austrian goalkeeper Kurt Schmied suffered from hyperthermia early in the match, quickly allowing the first three Swiss goals, before being assisted by the Austrian masseur while in play.

=== Details ===
26 June 1954
17:00 CET

| Austria | 7–5 | Switzerland |
|---|---|---|
| Wagner 25', 27', 53'; A. Körner 26', 34'; Ocwirk 32'; Probst 76' | | Ballaman 16', 39'; Hügi 17', 19', 60' |

Stade Olympique de la Pontaise, Lausanne
Attendance: 35,000
Referee: Charlie Faultless (Scotland)

Austria
Switzerland

| GK | 1 | Kurt Schmied |
| RB | 2 | Gerhard Hanappi |
| CB | 3 | Ernst Happel |
| LB | 4 | Leopold Barschandt |
| RH | 5 | Ernst Ocwirk (c) |
| LH | 6 | Karl Koller |
| OR | 7 | Robert Körner |
| IR | 21 | Ernst Stojaspal |
| CF | 9 | Theodor Wagner |
| IL | 10 | Erich Probst |
| OL | 11 | Alfred Körner |
Manager:
Walter Nausch

| GK | 2 | Eugene Parlier |
| DF | 7 | André Neury |
| DF | 14 | Willy Kernen |
| DF | 10 | Oliver Eggimann |
| MF | 4 | Roger Bocquet (c) |
| MF | 9 | Charles Casali |
| FW | 15 | Charles Antenen |
| FW | 22 | Roger Vonlanthen |
| FW | 18 | Josef Hügi |
| FW | 16 | Robert Ballaman |
| FW | 17 | Jacques Fatton |
Manager:
(Austria) Karl Rappan

Assistant referees:
Emil Schmetzer (West Germany)
Manuel Asensi (Spain)

== See also ==
- Austria at the FIFA World Cup
- Switzerland at the FIFA World Cup
