= Zetter =

Zetter may refer to:

== People ==
- Felipe Zetter (1923–2013), Mexican football player
- Kim Zetter, American journalist
- Miriam Zetter (born 1989), Mexican ten-pin bowler

== Places ==
- Zetter Hotel, a hotel in London.
