= Kurt Svensson =

Kurt Svensson may refer to:

- Kurt Svensson (footballer)
- Kurt Svensson (ice hockey)
