= Brazil at the 2018 FIFA World Cup =

Matches of the Brazil national football team in the 2018 FIFA World Cup

The following article concerns the performance of Brazil at the 2018 FIFA World Cup.

They reached the quarter-finals, eventually being knocked out 2–1 by Belgium.

== Squad ==
Coach: Tite

Brazil's final squad was announced on 14 May 2018.

No.	Pos.	Player	Date of birth (age)	Caps	Goals	Club
1	GK	Alisson	2 October 1992 (aged 25)	26	0	(Italian Football Federation) AS Roma
2	DF	Thiago Silva	22 September 1984 (aged 33)	71	5	(French Football Federation) Paris Saint-Germain
3	DF	Miranda	7 September 1984 (aged 33)	47	2	(Italian Football Federation) Inter Milan
4	DF	Pedro Geromel	21 September 1985 (aged 32)	2	0	(Brazilian Football Confederation) Grêmio
5	MF	Casemiro	23 February 1992 (aged 26)	24	0	(Royal Spanish Football Federation) Real Madrid
6	DF	Filipe Luís	9 August 1985 (aged 32)	33	2	(Royal Spanish Football Federation) Atlético Madrid
7	FW	Douglas Costa	14 September 1990 (aged 27)	25	3	(Italian Football Federation) Juventus
8	MF	Renato Augusto	8 February 1988 (aged 30)	28	5	(Brazilian Football Confederation) Corinthians
9	FW	Gabriel Jesus	3 April 1997 (aged 21)	17	10	(The Football Association) Manchester City
10	FW	Neymar	5 February 1992 (aged 26)	85	55	(French Football Federation) Paris Saint-Germain
11	MF	Philippe Coutinho	12 June 1992 (aged 26)	37	10	(Royal Spanish Football Federation) Barcelona
12	DF	Marcelo (captain)	12 May 1988 (aged 30)	54	6	(Royal Spanish Football Federation) Real Madrid
13	DF	Marquinhos	14 May 1994 (aged 24)	26	0	(French Football Federation) Paris Saint-Germain
14	DF	Danilo	15 July 1991 (aged 26)	18	0	(Italian Football Federation) Juventus FC
15	MF	Paulinho	25 July 1988 (aged 29)	50	12	(Royal Spanish Football Federation) Barcelona
16	GK	Cássio	6 June 1987 (aged 31)	1	0	(Brazilian Football Confederation) Corinthians
17	MF	Fernandinho	4 May 1985 (aged 33)	44	2	(The Football Association) Manchester City
18	MF	Fred	5 March 1993 (aged 25)	8	0	(Ukrainian Association of Football) Shakhtar Donetsk
19	MF	Willian	9 August 1988 (aged 29)	57	8	(The Football Association) Chelsea
20	FW	Roberto Firmino	2 October 1991 (aged 26)	21	6	(The Football Association) Liverpool
21	FW	Taison	13 January 1988 (aged 30)	8	1	(Ukrainian Association of Football) Shakhtar Donetsk
22	DF	Fagner	11 June 1989 (aged 29)	4	0	(Brazilian Football Confederation) Corinthians
23	GK	Ederson	17 August 1993 (aged 24)	1	0	(The Football Association) Manchester City

== Group stage ==
=== Group E ===
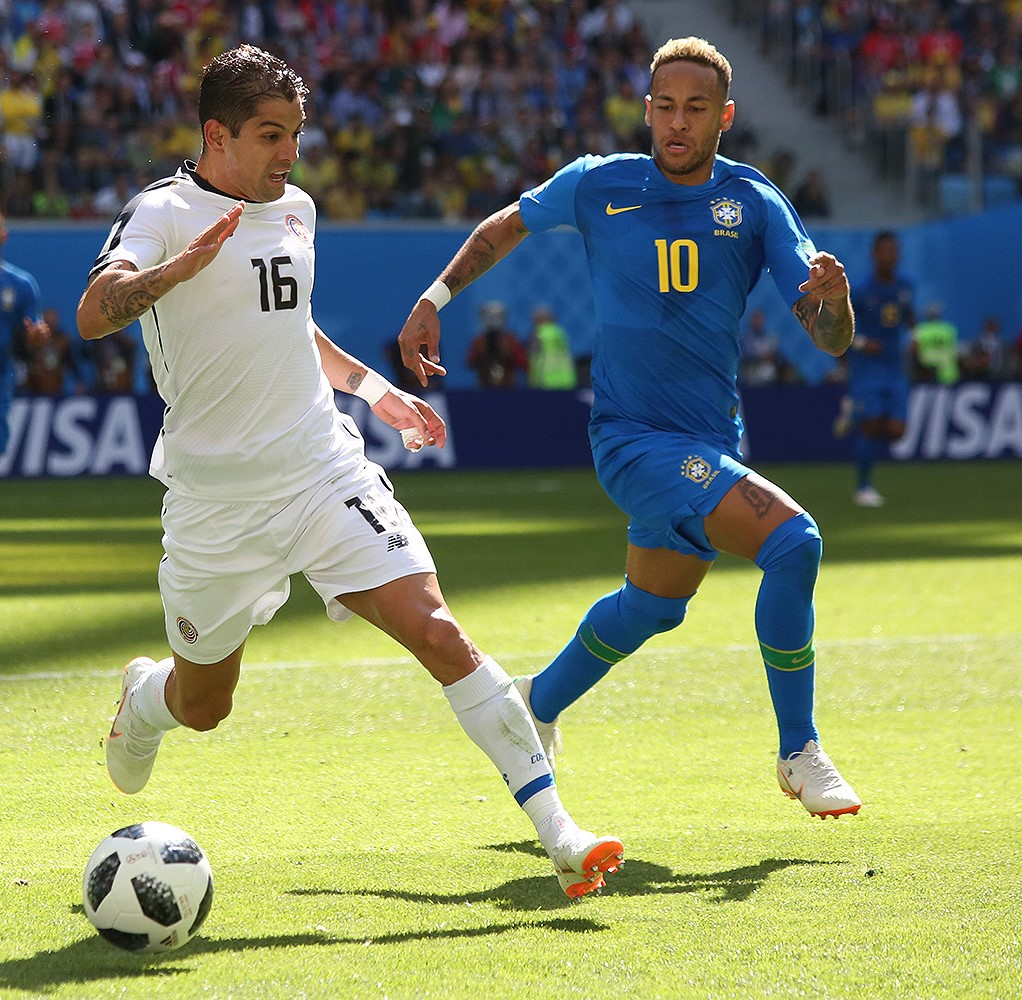
Brazil v Costa Rica

Pos	Team	Pld	W	D	L	GF	GA	GD	Pts	Qualification
1	Brazil	3	2	1	0	5	1	+4	7	Advance to knockout stage
2	Switzerland	3	1	2	0	5	4	+1	5	Advance to knockout stage
3	Serbia	3	1	0	2	2	4	−2	3	
4	Costa Rica	3	0	1	2	2	5	−3	1	

Source: FIFA
Rules for classification: Group stage tiebreakers
17 June 2018
16:00 SAMT (UTC+4)

Costa Rica	0–1	Serbia
		Kolarov 56'

Cosmos Arena, Samara
Attendance: 41,432
Referee: Malang Diedhiou (Senegal)
17 June 2018
21:00 MSK (UTC+3)

Brazil	1–1	Switzerland
Coutinho 20'		Zuber 50'

Rostov Arena, Rostov-on-Don
Attendance: 43,109
Referee: César Arturo Ramos (Mexico)

22 June 2018
15:00 MSK (UTC+3)

Brazil	2–0	Costa Rica
Coutinho 90+1'; Neymar 90+7'

Krestovsky Stadium, Saint Petersburg
Attendance: 64,468
Referee: Björn Kuipers (Netherlands)
22 June 2018
20:00 KALT (UTC+2)

Serbia	1–2	Switzerland
Mitrović 5'		Xhaka 52'; Shaqiri 90'

Kaliningrad Stadium, Kaliningrad
Attendance: 33,167
Referee: Felix Brych (Germany)

27 June 2018
21:00 MSK (UTC+3)

Serbia	0–2	Brazil
		Paulinho 36'; Thiago Silva 68'

Otkritie Arena, Moscow
Attendance: 44,190
Referee: Alireza Faghani (Iran)
27 June 2018
21:00 MSK (UTC+3)

Switzerland	2–2	Costa Rica
Džemaili 31'; Drmić 88'		Waston 56'; Sommer 90+3' (o.g.)

Nizhny Novgorod Stadium, Nizhny Novgorod
Attendance: 43,319
Referee: Clément Turpin (France)

=== Brazil vs Switzerland ===
The two teams had met in eight matches, including one game at the 1950 FIFA World Cup group stage, a 2–2 draw.

Paulinho's close-range effort forced Yann Sommer into a save. The first goal was scored shortly after when Philippe Coutinho scored from outside the penalty area with a right foot shot. Brazil also came close before the break as Thiago Silva headed inches over the crossbar. Five minutes into the second half, Steven Zuber equalised with a controversial header after a corner from the right decided by VAR review when he appeared to push Miranda in the back. More controversy was caused in the 73rd minute, after Gabriel Jesus was denied a penalty after being hacked down by Manuel Akanji in the penalty area. Brazil came close several times during the closing minutes, but Neymar, Roberto Firmino, and Miranda were unable to garner goals.

Brazil have failed to win any of their last three World Cup matches (D1 L2), their worst winless run since June 1978, when they went four games without a win. Valon Behrami is the first Switzerland player in history to appear at four World Cups. Brazil failed to win their opening match at the World Cup for the first time since 1978, when they drew 1–1 with Sweden.

17 June 2018
21:00 MSK (UTC+3)

Brazil	1–1	Switzerland
Coutinho 20'	Report	Zuber 50'

Rostov Arena, Rostov-on-Don
Attendance: 43,109
Referee: César Arturo Ramos (Mexico)

Brazil	Switzerland

GK	1	Alisson
RB	14	Danilo
CB	2	Thiago Silva
CB	3	Miranda
LB	12	Marcelo (c)
CM	5	Casemiro	(yellow card) 47'	(substituted off) 60'
CM	15	Paulinho		(substituted off) 67'
RW	19	Willian
AM	11	Philippe Coutinho
LW	10	Neymar
CF	9	Gabriel Jesus		(substituted off) 79'
Substitutions:
MF	17	Fernandinho		(substituted on) 60'
MF	8	Renato Augusto		(substituted on) 67'
FW	20	Roberto Firmino		(substituted on) 79'
Manager:
Tite

GK	1	Yann Sommer
RB	2	Stephan Lichtsteiner (c)	(yellow card) 31'	(substituted off) 87'
CB	22	Fabian Schär	(yellow card) 65'
CB	5	Manuel Akanji
LB	13	Ricardo Rodríguez
CM	11	Valon Behrami	(yellow card) 68'	(substituted off) 71'
CM	10	Granit Xhaka
RW	23	Xherdan Shaqiri
AM	15	Blerim Džemaili
LW	14	Steven Zuber
CF	9	Haris Seferovic		(substituted off) 80'
Substitutions:
MF	17	Denis Zakaria		(substituted on) 71'
FW	7	Breel Embolo		(substituted on) 80'
DF	6	Michael Lang		(substituted on) 87'
Manager:
Vladimir Petković

Man of the Match:
Philippe Coutinho (Brazil)

Assistant referees:
Marvin Torrentera (Mexico)
Miguel Hernández (Mexico)
Fourth official:
John Pitti (Panama)
Reserve assistant referee:
Gabriel Victoria (Panama)
Video assistant referee:
Paolo Valeri (Italy)
Assistant video assistant referees:
Mauro Vigliano (Argentina)
Elenito Di Liberatore (Italy)
Gianluca Rocchi (Italy)

=== Brazil vs Costa Rica ===
The two teams had met in ten matches, including two games at the FIFA World Cup's group stages, in 1990 and 2002, with both ending in a victory for Brazil's (1–0 and 5–2, respectively).

Celso Borges shot an effort wide of the target from a Cristian Gamboa cutback after 13 minutes. Gabriel Jesus shot into the back of the net from an offside position in the 25th minute. Marcelo shot a low drive five minutes from the break, which Keylor Navas stopped. After the break, Jesus headed against the crossbar before Navas diverted Philippe Coutinho's follow-up wide. Neymar curled around the right-hand post from 18 yards in the 72nd minute, before the officials arrived at the correct decision via VAR to deny him a penalty. Coutinho gave Brazil the lead in the 91st minute, when he burst into the box to get on the end of a Roberto Firmino nod down and a touch from Jesus before poking the ball low to the net. Neymar then tapped home Douglas Costa's chipped cross from the right from close range deeper into the stoppage time.

Neymar's strike seven minutes into stoppage time was the latest ever at a World Cup in regular time. This was Brazil's first World Cup victory thanks to a goal scored in the 90th minute. Costa Rica were knocked out of the tournament after this game for the first time since 2006, with a game to play.

22 June 2018
15:00 MSK (UTC+3)

Brazil	2–0	Costa Rica
Coutinho 90+1'; Neymar 90+7'	Report

Krestovsky Stadium, Saint Petersburg
Attendance: 64,468
Referee: Björn Kuipers (Netherlands)

Brazil	Costa Rica

GK	1	Alisson
RB	22	Fagner
CB	2	Thiago Silva (c)
CB	3	Miranda
LB	12	Marcelo
CM	5	Casemiro
CM	15	Paulinho		(substituted off) 68'
RW	19	Willian		(substituted off) 46'
AM	11	Philippe Coutinho	(yellow card) 81'
LW	10	Neymar	(yellow card) 81'
CF	9	Gabriel Jesus		(substituted off) 90+3'
Substitutions:
FW	7	Douglas Costa		(substituted on) 46'
FW	20	Roberto Firmino		(substituted on) 68'
MF	17	Fernandinho		(substituted on) 90+3'
Manager:
Tite

GK	1	Keylor Navas
SW	2	Jhonny Acosta	(yellow card) 84'
CB	3	Giancarlo González
CB	6	Óscar Duarte
RWB	16	Cristian Gamboa		(substituted off) 75'
LWB	8	Bryan Oviedo
CM	20	David Guzmán		(substituted off) 83'
CM	5	Celso Borges
RW	11	Johan Venegas
LW	10	Bryan Ruiz (c)
CF	21	Marco Ureña		(substituted off) 54'
Substitutions:
MF	7	Christian Bolaños		(substituted on) 54'
DF	15	Francisco Calvo		(substituted on) 75'
MF	17	Yeltsin Tejeda		(substituted on) 83'
Manager:
Óscar Ramírez

Man of the Match:
Philippe Coutinho (Brazil)

Assistant referees:
Sander van Roekel (Netherlands)
Erwin Zeinstra (Netherlands)
Fourth official:
Damir Skomina (Slovenia)
Reserve assistant referee:
Jure Praprotnik (Slovenia)
Video assistant referee:
Danny Makkelie (Netherlands)
Assistant video assistant referees:
Artur Soares Dias (Portugal)
Joe Fletcher (Canada)
Mark Geiger (United States)

=== Serbia vs Brazil ===
The two teams had met once, a 2014 friendly won by Brazil 1–0. Playing as Yugoslavia, the two teams met 18 times, including four times at FIFA World Cup's group stages in 1930, 1950, 1954 and 1974, with one victory each and two draws.

Marcelo was replaced with Filipe Luís in the 10th minute, due to a back spasm. Gabriel Jesus created a chance for Neymar, whose cross-goal strike was pushed away by Vladimir Stojković. Jesus cut inside of Miloš Veljković and saw his shot blocked behind by Nikola Milenković. In the 36th minute, Paulinho raced between two defenders and poked Philippe Coutinho's delivery beyond the onrushing Stojković. Neymar had a low drive kept out by Stojković at the near post five minutes into the second period. Aleksandar Mitrović headed a cross from Antonio Rukavina straight at the feet of the keeper in the 65th minute. Thiago Silva headed home at the near post from Neymar's left-wing corner in the 68th minute.

Brazil have qualified from the group stage of the World Cup for the 13th consecutive tournament, a run stretching back to 1970. Brazil have now won back-to-back World Cup matches for the first time since 2010, when they won their opening two group matches. For Serbia, this was the second consecutive elimination from the group stage in their World Cup history as an independent nation.

27 June 2018
21:00 MSK (UTC+3)

Serbia	0–2	Brazil
	Report	Paulinho 36'; Thiago Silva 68'

Otkritie Arena, Moscow
Attendance: 44,190
Referee: Alireza Faghani (Iran)

Serbia	Brazil

GK	1	Vladimir Stojković
RB	2	Antonio Rukavina
CB	15	Nikola Milenković
CB	13	Miloš Veljković
LB	11	Aleksandar Kolarov (c)
CM	21	Nemanja Matić	(yellow card) 48'
CM	20	Sergej Milinković-Savić
RW	10	Dušan Tadić
AM	22	Adem Ljajić	(yellow card) 33'	(substituted off) 75'
LW	17	Filip Kostić		(substituted off) 82'
CF	9	Aleksandar Mitrović	(yellow card) 70'	(substituted off) 89'
Substitutions:
MF	7	Andrija Živković		(substituted on) 75'
FW	18	Nemanja Radonjić		(substituted on) 82'
FW	19	Luka Jović		(substituted on) 89'
Manager:
Mladen Krstajić

GK	1	Alisson
RB	22	Fagner
CB	2	Thiago Silva
CB	3	Miranda (c)
LB	12	Marcelo	(substituted off) 10'
CM	15	Paulinho	(substituted off) 66'
CM	5	Casemiro
RW	19	Willian
AM	11	Philippe Coutinho	(substituted off) 80'
LW	10	Neymar
CF	9	Gabriel Jesus
Substitutions:
DF	6	Filipe Luís	(substituted on) 10'
MF	17	Fernandinho	(substituted on) 66'
MF	8	Renato Augusto	(substituted on) 80'
Manager:
Tite

Man of the Match:
Paulinho (Brazil)

Assistant referees:
Reza Sokhandan (Iran)
Mohammadreza Mansouri (Iran)
Fourth official:
Jair Marrufo (United States)
Reserve assistant referee:
Anouar Hmila (Tunisia)
Video assistant referee:
Massimiliano Irrati (Italy)
Assistant video assistant referees:
Paweł Gil (Poland)
Paweł Sokolnicki (Poland)
Paolo Valeri (Italy)

== Knock-out stage ==
=== Brazil vs Mexico ===
The teams had met in forty previous matches including two games at CONCACAF Gold Cup finals (1996 and 2003, both won by Mexico), the 1999 FIFA Confederations Cup Final (won 4–3 by Mexico), and four times in the FIFA World Cup group stage, three won by Brazil and one ending in a draw (4–0 in 1950, 5–0 in 1954, 2–0 in 1962 and 0–0 in 2014).

Hirving Lozano's half-volley was well blocked by Miranda, while at the other end, Guillermo Ochoa saved Neymar's drive from just outside the penalty area. After 25 minutes, Neymar raced past Edson Álvarez in the area and forced Ochoa into a save with his left hand. Gabriel Jesus went close in the 33rd minute, finding space in a crowded area and drilling in a left-footed strike that Ochoa palmed away. In the 51st minute, Neymar's back-heel on the edge of the area teed up Willian for a burst into the box and his scuffed cross from the left was slid into an empty net by Neymar from close range. With two minutes remaining, Neymar powered through on the left and his low effort was diverted by Ochoa's foot into the path of Roberto Firmino, who tapped the ball into an empty net from close range.

Since the introduction of the round of 16 in 1986, Mexico have been eliminated at this stage of the World Cup seven times – more than twice as many as any other nation. This was also Mexico's fourth defeat on the hand of Brazil, and moreover, Mexico had never scored a single goal against Brazil in the FIFA World Cup.

2 July 2018
18:00 SAMT (UTC+4)

Brazil	2–0	Mexico
Neymar 51'; Firmino 88'	Report

Cosmos Arena, Samara
Attendance: 41,970
Referee: Gianluca Rocchi (Italy)

Brazil	Mexico

GK	1	Alisson
RB	22	Fagner
CB	2	Thiago Silva (c)
CB	3	Miranda
LB	6	Filipe Luís	(yellow card) 43'
CM	15	Paulinho		(substituted off) 80'
CM	5	Casemiro	(yellow card) 59'
RW	19	Willian		(substituted off) 90+1'
AM	11	Philippe Coutinho		(substituted off) 86'
LW	10	Neymar
CF	9	Gabriel Jesus
Substitutions:
MF	17	Fernandinho		(substituted on) 80'
FW	20	Roberto Firmino		(substituted on) 86'
DF	13	Marquinhos		(substituted on) 90+1'
Manager:
Tite

GK	13	Guillermo Ochoa
RB	21	Edson Álvarez	(yellow card) 38'	(substituted off) 55'
CB	2	Hugo Ayala
CB	3	Carlos Salcedo	(yellow card) 77'
LB	23	Jesús Gallardo
CM	16	Héctor Herrera	(yellow card) 55'
CM	4	Rafael Márquez (c)		(substituted off) 46'
CM	18	Andrés Guardado	(yellow card) 90+2'
RF	11	Carlos Vela
CF	14	Javier Hernández		(substituted off) 60'
LF	22	Hirving Lozano
Substitutions:
MF	7	Miguel Layún		(substituted on) 46'
MF	6	Jonathan dos Santos		(substituted on) 55'
FW	9	Raúl Jiménez		(substituted on) 60'
Manager:
(Colombia) Juan Carlos Osorio

Man of the Match:
Neymar (Brazil)

Assistant referees:
Elenito Di Liberatore (Italy)
Mauro Tonolini (Italy)
Fourth official:
Antonio Mateu Lahoz (Spain)
Reserve assistant referee:
Pau Cebrián Devís (Spain)
Video assistant referee:
Massimiliano Irrati (Italy)
Assistant video assistant referees:
Paweł Gil (Poland)
Carlos Astroza (Chile)
Daniele Orsato (Italy)

=== Brazil vs Belgium ===
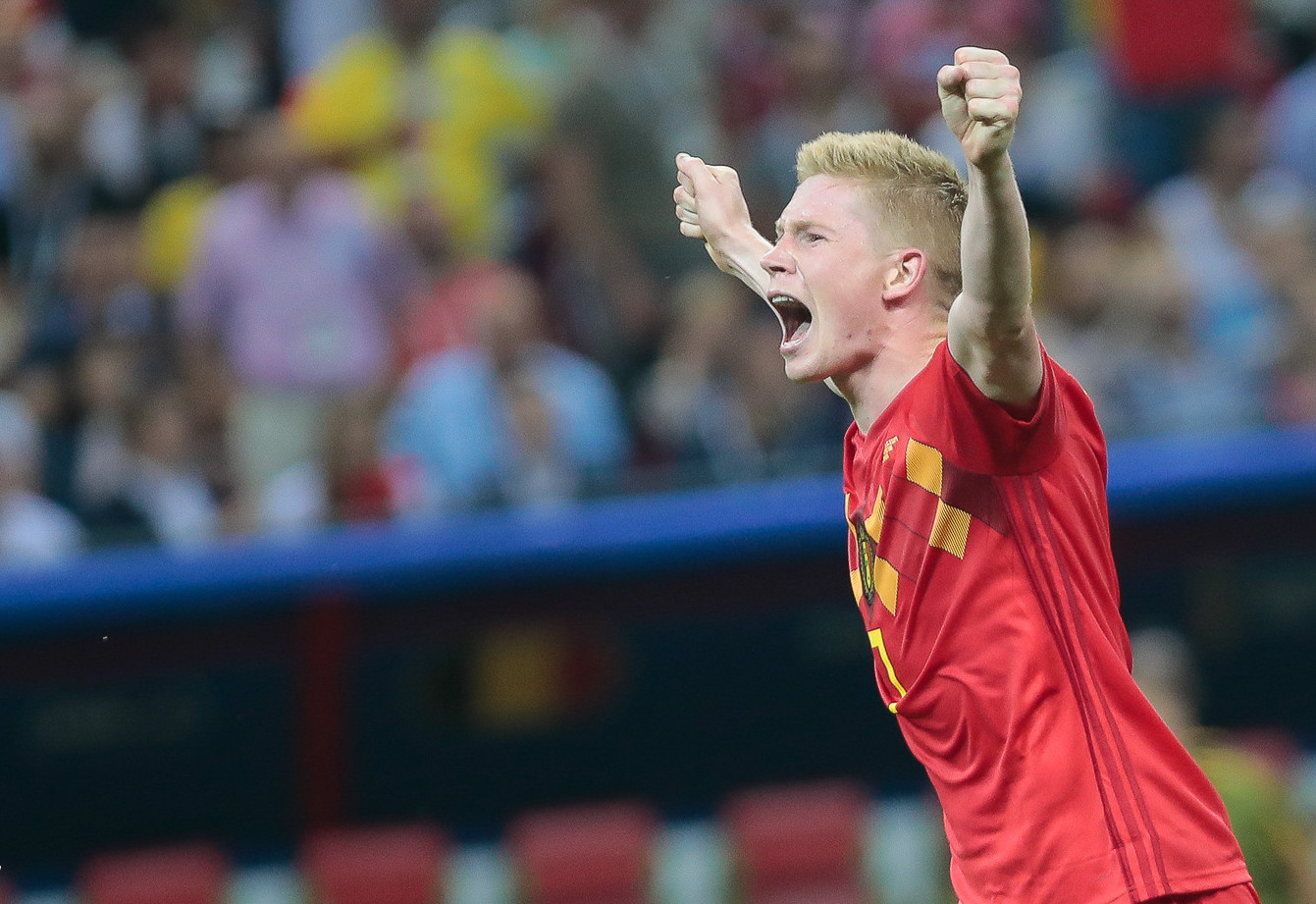
Belgium forward Kevin De Bruyne celebrating after the conclusion of the match.

The teams had met in four previous matches. Their most recent meeting came in a World Cup knockout stage match in 2002, Brazil winning 2–0 to advance to the quarter-finals. That match was also the only time the two sides had previously met in a World Cup.

Belgium scored from their first corner of the game in the 13th minute, Vincent Kompany flicked on Eden Hazard's left-wing delivery but the decisive touch came from Fernandinho, who turned the ball past Alisson via his arm. Belgium doubled their lead by breaking from a Brazil corner in the 31st minute, Kevin De Bruyne arrowed a right foot drive across Alisson and into the left corner of the net from the edge of the penalty area after Romelu Lukaku collected the ball, turned and embarked on a 40-yard run with a pass at the end to free De Bruyne. Brazil's third change yielded a goal three minutes and 14 seconds after his introduction, Renato Augusto gliding between two Belgium defenders to nod a flicked header past Thibaut Courtois from a Philippe Coutinho cross. Coutinho's first-time shot flew wide and yet another Neymar penalty appeal was rejected, before he drew a fingertip save from Courtois in the 94th minute.

De Bruyne became the 100th player to score at Russia 2018 (excluding own goals). Belgium have reached the World Cup semi-finals for only the second time, losing out to eventual winners Argentina in 1986. Belgium's victory was only their second ever against Brazil, and first since a 1963 friendly match in Brussels. This was the first time in 30 matches in all competitions that Brazil had conceded more than once in a game, since a 2–2 draw with Paraguay in March 2016.

6 July 2018
21:00 MSK (UTC+3)

Brazil	1–2	Belgium
Renato Augusto 76'	Report	Fernandinho 13' (o.g.); De Bruyne 31'

Kazan Arena, Kazan
Attendance: 42,873
Referee: Milorad Mažić (Serbia)

Brazil	Belgium

GK	1	Alisson
RB	22	Fagner	(yellow card) 90'
CB	2	Thiago Silva
CB	3	Miranda (c)
LB	12	Marcelo
CM	15	Paulinho		(substituted off) 73'
CM	17	Fernandinho	(yellow card) 85'
RW	19	Willian		(substituted off) 46'
AM	11	Philippe Coutinho
LW	10	Neymar
CF	9	Gabriel Jesus		(substituted off) 58'
Substitutions:
FW	20	Roberto Firmino		(substituted on) 46'
FW	7	Douglas Costa		(substituted on) 58'
MF	8	Renato Augusto		(substituted on) 73'
Manager:
Tite

GK	1	Thibaut Courtois
CB	2	Toby Alderweireld	(yellow card) 47'
CB	4	Vincent Kompany
CB	5	Jan Vertonghen
RM	15	Thomas Meunier	(yellow card) 71'
CM	8	Marouane Fellaini
CM	6	Axel Witsel
LM	22	Nacer Chadli		(substituted off) 83'
RF	7	Kevin De Bruyne
CF	9	Romelu Lukaku		(substituted off) 87'
LF	10	Eden Hazard (c)
Substitutions:
DF	3	Thomas Vermaelen		(substituted on) 83'
MF	17	Youri Tielemans		(substituted on) 87'
Manager:
(Spain) Roberto Martínez

Man of the Match:
Kevin De Bruyne (Belgium)

Assistant referees:
Milovan Ristić (Serbia)
Dalibor Đurđević (Serbia)
Fourth official:
Jair Marrufo (United States)
Reserve assistant referee:
Corey Rockwell (United States)
Video assistant referee:
Daniele Orsato (Italy)
Assistant video assistant referees:
Paweł Gil (Poland)
Mark Borsch (Germany)
Felix Zwayer (Germany)
