= Miguel Flores =

Miguel Flores may refer to:

- Miguel Flores (boxer) (born 1992), American boxer
- Miguel Flores (footballer), Chilean footballer
- Miguel Flores (baseball), baseball infielder and manager
- Miguel Ángel Flores (born 1983), Honduran footballer
