= Marcial =

Marcial is both a given name and a surname. Notable people with the name include:

== People with the given name ==
- Marcial Ávalos, Paraguayan footballer
- Marcial Calleja (1863–1914), Filipino lawyer
- Marcial Cuquerella (born 1977), Spanish businessman
- Marcial Gómez Parejo (1930–2012), Spanish painter and illustrator
- Marcial Hernandez (born 1974), Dutch military officer and politician
- Marcial Lichauco (1902–1971), Filipino lawyer and diplomat
- Marcial Maciel (1920–2008), Mexican Catholic priest and sex offender
- Marcial Mes (c. 1949 – 2014), Belizean politician
- Marcial Pina (born 1946), Spanish footballer
- Marcial Samaniego, Paraguayan general, writer and politician

== People with the surname ==
- Ana Marcial (born 1953), Puerto Rican swimmer
- Eumir Felix Marcial (born 1995), Filipino boxer

== See also ==
- Martial (disambiguation)
- San Marcial, New Mexico
