= Hilarión Osorio =

Paraguayan footballer (1928-1990)

Personal information
- Date of birth: 1928
- Place of birth: Paraguay
- Date of death: 1990 (aged 61–62)
- Position: Forward

Senior career*
Years	Team	Apps	(Gls)
- Club Sportivo Luqueño

International career
- Paraguay
- * Club domestic league appearances and goals

Hilarión Osorio (1928 – 1990) was a Paraguayan football forward who played for Paraguay in the 1950 FIFA World Cup. He also played for Club Sportivo Luqueño.

== Trajectory ==
Player of the Club Sportivo Luqueño, for the Paraguay in the 1950 FIFA World Cup and the 1956 South American Championship
