= Lorenzo Calonga =

Paraguayan footballer (1929-2003)

Personal information
- Full name: Lorenzo Calonga Arce
- Date of birth: 28 August 1929
- Place of birth: Paraguay
- Date of death: 20 September 2003 (aged 74)
- Place of death: Arauca, Arauca, Colombia
- Positions: Striker; midfielder

Senior career*
Years	Team	Apps	(Gls)
–	Cerro Porteño		
–	Olimpia		
1947–1950	Club Guaraní		
1951–1953	Deportivo Pereira	68	(10)
1954–1957	Independiente Medellín	88	(9)
1958	Irapuato		
–	León		

International career
1950	Paraguay	1	(1)

Managerial career
- 1961: Deportes Quindío
- * Club domestic league appearances and goals

Lorenzo Calonga Arce (28 August 1929 – 20 September 2003) was a Paraguayan football striker and midfielder who was part of the Paraguay squad for the 1950 FIFA World Cup finals.

== Career ==
Calonga began playing football in Paraguay with Cerro Porteño, Club Olimpia and Club Guaraní, where he won the 1949 Paraguayan Primera División title. He moved to Colombia where he played for Deportivo Pereira and Independiente Medellín. He finished his playing career in Mexico with Club León and Club Irapuato.

Calonga scored a goal for the Paraguay national team in a friendly against Brazil on 13 May 1950.

After he retired from playing, Calonga returned to Colombia to work as a coach. He managed Deportes Quindío during the 1961 season.

== Personal ==
Lorenzo Calonga is from a Paraguayan family of famous athletes, including Manuel Calonga who played football and basketball for Club Guaraní.

Calonga died from pneumonia in Arauca, at the age of 77.
