= Ervin Katnić =

Yugoslav footballer

Personal information
- Date of birth: 2 September 1921
- Place of birth: Pula, Kingdom of Yugoslavia
- Date of death: 4 January 1979 (aged 57)
- Place of death: Split, SR Croatia, SFR Yugoslavia
- Position: Midfielder

Senior career*
Years	Team	Apps	(Gls)
1939-1941	Grion Pola		
1944–1952	Hajduk Split	106	(0)
- * Club domestic league appearances and goals

Ervin Katnić (2 September 1921 – 4 January 1979) was a Yugoslav football midfielder who was a member of the Yugoslavia national team at the 1950 FIFA World Cup. However, he never earned a cap for his country. He also played for Hajduk Split.
