= Elioro Paredes =

Paraguayan footballer (born 1921)

Personal information
- Full name: Elioro Manuel Paredes Anarizia
- Date of birth: 19 February 1921
- Place of birth: Paraguay
- Position: Defender

Senior career*
Years	Team	Apps	(Gls)
- Club Sportivo Luqueño

International career
- Paraguay
- * Club domestic league appearances and goals

Elioro Manuel Paredes Anarizia (born 19 February 1921, date of death unknown) was a Paraguayan football defender who played for Paraguay in the 1950 FIFA World Cup. He also played for Club Sportivo Luqueño. Paredes is deceased.
