= Alberto Aparicio =

Bolivian footballer (born 1923)

Personal information
- Date of birth: 11 November 1923
- Place of birth: La Paz, Bolivia
- Position: Midfielder

Senior career*
Years	Team	Apps	(Gls)
- Ferroviario La Paz

International career
- Bolivia
- * Club domestic league appearances and goals

Alberto Aparicio (born 11 November 1923, date of death unknown) was a Bolivian footballer who played as a midfielder for Bolivia in the 1950 FIFA World Cup. He also played for Ferroviario La Paz. Aparicio is deceased.
