= Mario Pretto =

Italian footballer and manager

Personal information
- Date of birth: 7 October 1915
- Place of birth: Schio, Italy
- Date of death: 2 April 1984 (aged 68)
- Place of death: Campinas, Brazil
- Position: Right-back

Senior career*
Years	Team	Apps	(Gls)
- Calcio Schio
1937–1949	Napoli	223	(1)

Managerial career
- 1950: Litoral
- 1950: Bolivia
- 1951–1954: Audax Italiano
- 1954–1955: Unión La Calera
- 1955: Chile (assistant)
- 1957–1958: Guarani
- * Club domestic league appearances and goals

Mario Pretto (7 October 1915 – 2 April 1984) was an Italian footballer turned coach who managed Bolivia in the 1950 FIFA World Cup.

== Career ==
A football defender, Pretto was with Calcio Schio before joining Napoli in 1937, with whom he spent his entire professional career.

Following his retirement, he emigrated to South America and managed Bolivian club Litoral and subsequently the Bolivia national team in the 1950 FIFA World Cup.

In 1951, he came to Chile and led Audax Italiano until 1954. The next year, he served as the assistant coach of Luis Tirado in the Chile national team.

In 1957, he moved to Brazil, led Guarani and made his home in Campinas, São Paulo state.

== Outside football ==
He made an appearance in the 1948 Italian film 11 uomini e un pallone (Eleven men and a ball) by Carlo Dapporto, alongside the also footballers Amedeo Amadei, Carlo Parola, Leandro Remondini and Héctor Puricelli.
