= Zetter Hotel =

The Zetter Hotel
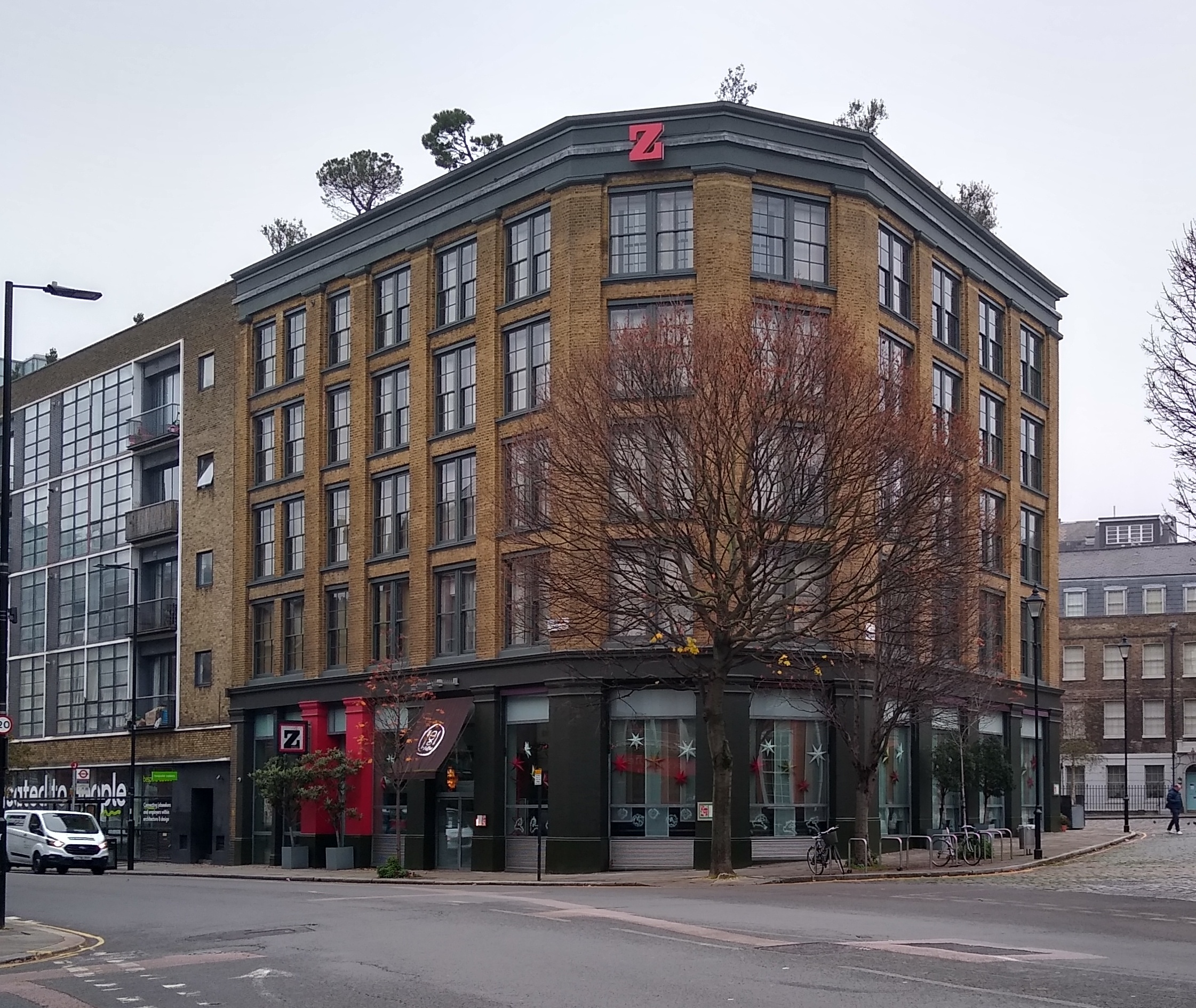

General information
- Location: Clerkenwell, London, England, 86-88 Clerkenwell Road, EC1M 5RJ
- Coordinates: 51.52271°N 0.10373°W
- Owner: The Zetter Group

Other information
- Number of rooms: 59

The Zetter Hotel is a hotel in London, located at 86-88 Clerkenwell Road in Clerkenwell, London.

The hotel is owned by The Zetter Group, itself owned by investors Mark Sainsbury (son of John Sainsbury, Baron Sainsbury of Preston Candover), Michael Benyan, and Jason Catifeoglou.
