= Melanio Báez =

Paraguayan footballer (born 1931)

Personal information
- Date of birth: May 9th 1931
- Place of birth: Santísima Trinidad (Asunción), Paraguay
- Position: Midfielder

Senior career*
| Years | Team | Apps | (Gls) |
- Club Nacional

International career
- Paraguay
- * Club domestic league appearances and goals

Melanio Báez (born c. July 1931, date of death unknown) was a Paraguayan football midfielder who played for Paraguay in the 1950 FIFA World Cup. He also played for Club Nacional. Báez is deceased.
