= Humberto Saavedra =

Bolivian footballer (born 1923)

Personal information
- Full name: Humberto Saavedra Araújo
- Date of birth: 3 August 1923
- Place of birth: Bolivia
- Position: Midfielder

Senior career*
Years	Team	Apps	(Gls)
- The Strongest

International career
- Bolivia
- * Club domestic league appearances and goals

Humberto Saavedra Araújo (born 3 August 1923, date of death unknown) was a Bolivian football midfielder who played for Bolivia in the 1950 FIFA World Cup. He also played for The Strongest. Saavedra is deceased.
