= Carlos Guevara (footballer) =

Mexican footballer (born 1930)

Personal information
- Date of birth: 3 April 1930
- Place of birth: Puebla, Mexico
- Date of death: Unknown
- Position: Midfielder

Senior career*
Years	Team	Apps	(Gls)
- Asturias

International career
1950	Mexico	3	(0)
- * Club domestic league appearances and goals

Carlos Guevara (born 3 April 1930, date of death unknown) was a Mexican former football midfielder who played for Mexico in the 1950 FIFA World Cup. He also played for Asturias. Guevara is deceased.
