= Nena (footballer, born 1923) =

Brazilian footballer (1923–2010)

Personal information
- Full name: Olavo Rodrigues Barbosa
- Date of birth: 11 July 1923
- Place of birth: Porto Alegre, Brazil
- Date of death: 17 November 2010 (aged 87)
- Place of death: Goiânia, Brazil

Senior career*
Years	Team	Apps	(Gls)
1940–1949	Internacional		
1949–1958	Portuguesa		

International career
1947–1950	Brazil		

Managerial career
- Corinthians (youth)
Medal record
Representing Brazil
FIFA World Cup
Runner-up	1950 Brazil
- * Club domestic league appearances and goals

Olavo Rodrigues Barbosa, best known as Nena, (11 July 1923 – 17 November 2010) was a Brazilian football player. He was born in Porto Alegre, Rio Grande do Sul.

From 1940 to 1949, the defender played with SC Internacional in Porto Alegre and won with the club eight state championships. In 1949, he moved to Associação Portuguesa de Desportos in São Paulo with which he won the Torneio Rio – São Paulo of 1952 and 1955. He ended his playing career with the club in 1958 but stayed on as auxiliary coach and functionary. In the 1960s he worked as youth coach with SC Corinthians Paulista.

Between 1947 and 1952, he played five times for the Brazil national team. He was also part of the Brazilian roster of the 1950 World Cup where Brazil finished as runner up, but did not get to play.

In 2003, he moved with his wife to Goiânia, capital of the state Goiás in the interior of Brazil. There the father of five children died in 2010 from lung cancer.

== Honours ==
Internacional

- Campeonato Gaúcho: 1940, 1941, 1942, 1943, 1944, 1945, 1947 and 1948

Portuguesa

- Torneio Rio – São Paulo: 1952, 1955

Brazil

- FIFA World Cup runner-up: 1950
