= Kurt Rey =

Swiss footballer (born 1923)

Personal information
- Date of birth: 10 December 1923
- Place of birth: Switzerland
- Position: Defender

Senior career*
Years	Team	Apps	(Gls)
- SC Young Fellows Juventus

International career
1950	Switzerland	1	(0)
- * Club domestic league appearances and goals

Kurt Rey (born 10 December 1923, date of death unknown) was a Swiss football defender who played for Switzerland in the 1950 FIFA World Cup. He also played for SC Young Fellows Juventus. Rey is deceased.
