= Willi Steffen =

Swiss footballer (1925-2005)

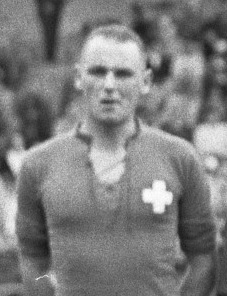

Personal information
- Date of birth: 17 March 1925
- Place of birth: Bern, Switzerland
- Date of death: 3 May 2005 (aged 80)
- Place of death: Bern, Switzerland
- Position: Left-back

Senior career*
Years	Team	Apps	(Gls)
1942–1946	Cantonal Neuchâtel	?	(?)
1946–1947	Chelsea	15	(0)
1947–1950	Cantonal Neuchâtel	?	(?)
1950–1959	Young Boys Bern	?	(?)

International career
1945–1955	Switzerland	28	(0)
- * Club domestic league appearances and goals

Willi Steffen (17 March 1925 – 3 May 2005) was a Swiss international footballer who played as a left-back.

Steffen started out as an amateur with Cantonal Neuchâtel and later became the first Swiss footballer to play in England when he signed for Chelsea. He had only journeyed to England to learn the language, having been sent by his parents in preparation for him joining the family's fruit and vegetable business, but his teacher turned out to be the wife of then-Chelsea manager, Billy Birrell. He was given a trial and signed for the club in July 1946.

Steffen was a cultured and dedicated full back, tall and pacy, who quickly became a crowd favourite at Chelsea, while his blonde hair and good looks also won him admirers. He made his debut in a 3–1 loss against Derby County and played 20 league and cup games for Chelsea during the 1946-47 season, including a memorable FA Cup win over Arsenal at Highbury, during which he expertly marked winger Ian McPherson. Steffen returned to Switzerland at the end of the season to finish his national service and was made club captain in his final game for Chelsea, also against Derby.

Upon his return to Switzerland he re-joined Cantonal before moving to Young Boys Bern in 1950. With them, he won the Swiss Super League four years in succession from 1957-60 as well as the Schweizer Cup in 1953 and 1958.

A former fighter pilot, Steffen played for Switzerland at the 1950 FIFA World Cup, though they went out in the group stages. He also played in a 1–0 win over an England side containing Stanley Matthews, Tommy Lawton and Billy Wright in Zurich in 1947. He won 28 international caps for his country.

He died in Bern in 2005, aged 80.
