= Víctor Brown =

Bolivian footballer (born 1927)

Personal information
- Full name: Víctor Brown Rojas
- Date of birth: 7 March 1927
- Place of birth: Tarija, Bolivia
- Position: Forward

Senior career*
Years	Team	Apps	(Gls)
- Club Litoral

International career
1950-1957	Bolivia	16	(0)
- * Club domestic league appearances and goals

Víctor Brown Rojas (born 7 March 1927, date of death unknown) was a Bolivian football forward who played for Bolivia in the 1950 FIFA World Cup. He also played for Club Litoral. Brown is deceased.
