= Pablo Centurión =

Paraguayan footballer

Personal information
- Place of birth: Paraguay
- Position: Goalkeeper

Senior career*
Years	Team	Apps	(Gls)
1950	Cerro Porteño		
1951–1957	Boca Juniors de Cali		
1958–1963	Millonarios		
1964–1965	Atlético Nacional		
1965–1967	Santa Fe		

International career
- Paraguay
- * Club domestic league appearances and goals

Pablo Centurión was a Paraguayan football goalkeeper who played for Paraguay in the 1950 FIFA World Cup. He also played for Cerro Porteño.

In 1951, Centurión joined Fútbol Profesional Colombiano side Boca Juniors de Cali. He played for Boca Juniors for seven years, before moving to Millonarios, Atlético Nacional and Santa Fe.

Centurión is deceased.
