= Leonardo Navarro =

Mexican footballer (1915-2000)

Personal information
- Full name: José Leonardo Navarro Galíndez
- Date of birth: 1915
- Place of birth: Mexico
- Date of death: 2000 (aged 84–85)
- Position: Forward

Senior career*
Years	Team	Apps	(Gls)
- Atlante

International career
1950	Mexico	2	(1)
- * Club domestic league appearances and goals

José Leonardo Navarro Galíndez (1915–2000) was a Mexican football forward who played for Mexico in the 1950 FIFA World Cup. He also played for Atlante.
