= Salomon Corrodi =

Italian painter

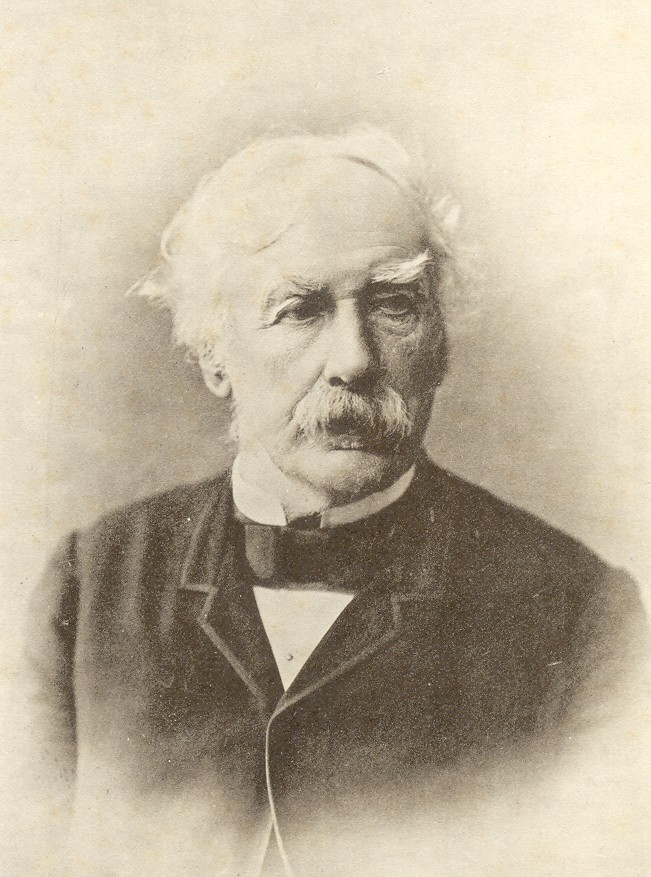
Salomon Corrodi (c.1890)

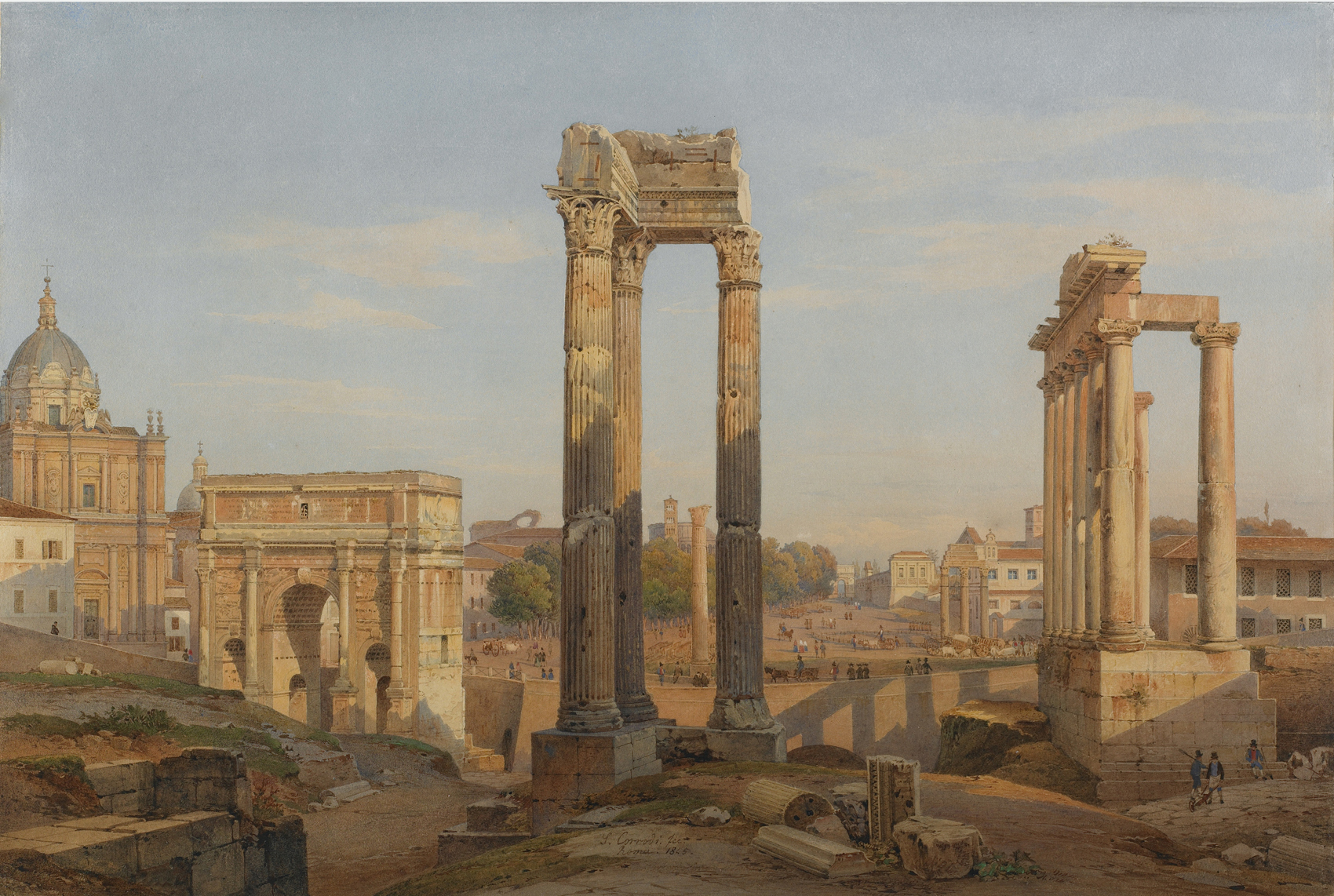
View of the Forum Romanum (1845)

Salomon Corrodi (23 April 1810 – July 4, 1892) was a Swiss-Italian painter, mainly of watercolor landscapes.

== Biography ==
He was born in Fehraltorf, the son of an Italian Protestant preacher living in Switzerland. Two of his sons, Hermann and Arnold, were also painters. A collection of his vedute has been published. He trained with Johann Jakob Wetzel (1781-1834), and came to Rome in 1832, along with his fellow pupil Jakob Suter (1805–1874), after visiting Genoa and Pisa. In Rome, he was influenced by the circle of Neoclassical artists around Bertel Thorvaldsen He died in Como, Italy.

== Notes ==
- Rocky Landscape (attributed to Corrodi).
