= Hermann David Salomon Corrodi =

Italian painter (1844–1905)

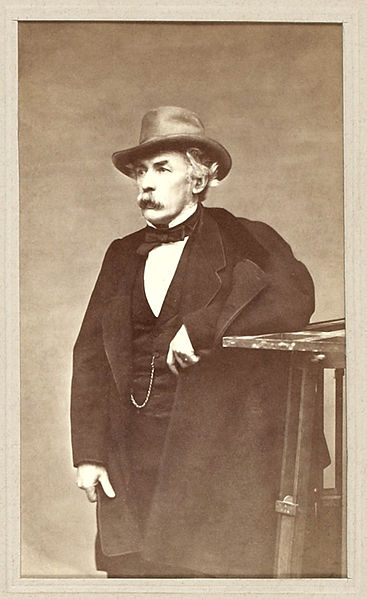
- Hermann David Salomon Corrodi, 1860
- Born: July 1844; Frascati, Italy
- Died: 30 January 1905 (aged 60)
- Education: Academy of St Luke, Rome
- Known for: Painter

Hermann David Salomon Corrodi (July 1844 – 30 January 1905) was an Italian painter of landscapes and orientalist scenes.

== Biography ==
Corrodi was born in Frascati (an alternate source lists his birthplace as Zurich) and lived for many years in Rome." Corrodi studied at the Academy of St Luke under his father, Salomon Corrodi (1810–1892) and in Paris (1872).

In 1872, he became acquainted with British painter Lawrence Alma-Tadema, at whose initiative he was invited to London and introduced to the royal family. Corrodi received commissions for history paintings from the British royal family. He was acquainted with most of the European royalty of the time, including a friendship with Queen Victoria, and traveled widely in the Far East, Egypt, Syria, Cyprus, Greece and Turkey, which provided the subject matter for many of his paintings. He is the brother of Arnold Corrodi. Originally a landscape painter in the academic style, much of his work is also typical of the Orientalism style of the 19th century. In 1893 he was knighted as an Academic of Merit by the Academy of St Luke, where he had been a professor. He died in Rome on 30 January 1905.

Corrodi's work is in the Frye Art Museum in Seattle, the Dahesh Museum of Art in New York, Qatar National Museum, and Museo di Roma in Trastevere.

== Listed works ==
- Prayer at Dusk, Venice
- Campfire by the River: The Kiosk of Trajan at Philae
- Fetching Water at a Fountain
- Italian Fishermen By The Sea, Southern Italy
- Fisherman at Rest on a Vessel in Quiet Waters
- Processione A Sorrento
- The Ambush
- Arab Carpet Merchants
- Sunset on the Nile
- At the Water's Edge
- Prayers at Dawn
- ″Ein Fischer und Meerjungfrauen in der Blauen Grotte auf Capri″
- The monks of Mount Athos walking to dawn prayers
- The Acropolis, Athens

== Selected paintings ==
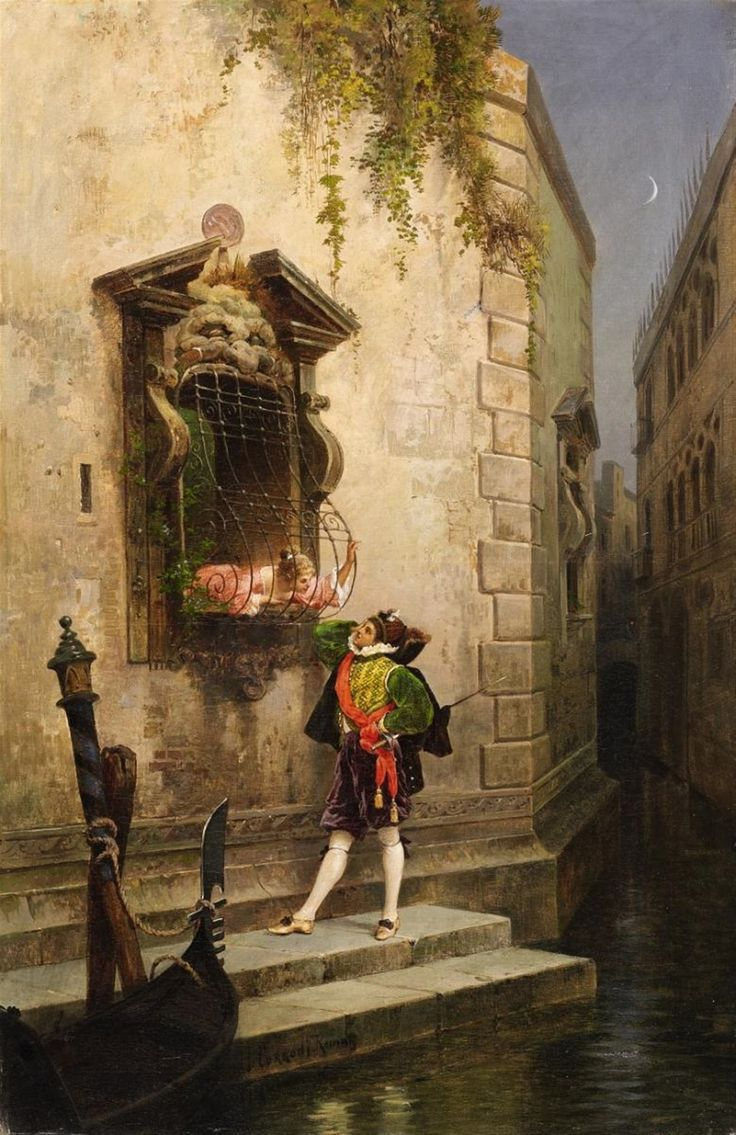
A Night Scene in Venice

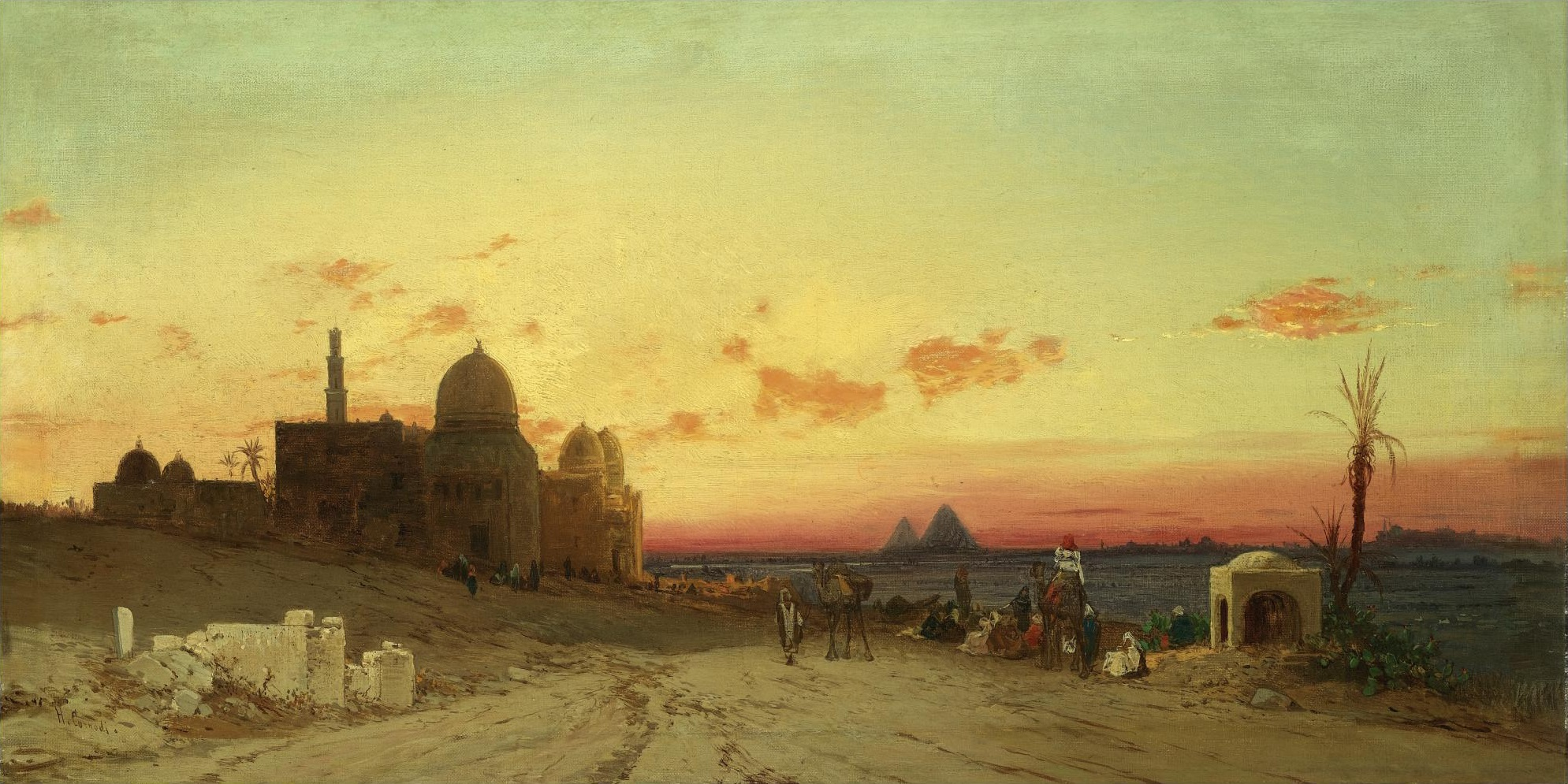
View of the Tomb of the Caliphs with the Pyramids of Giza Beyond

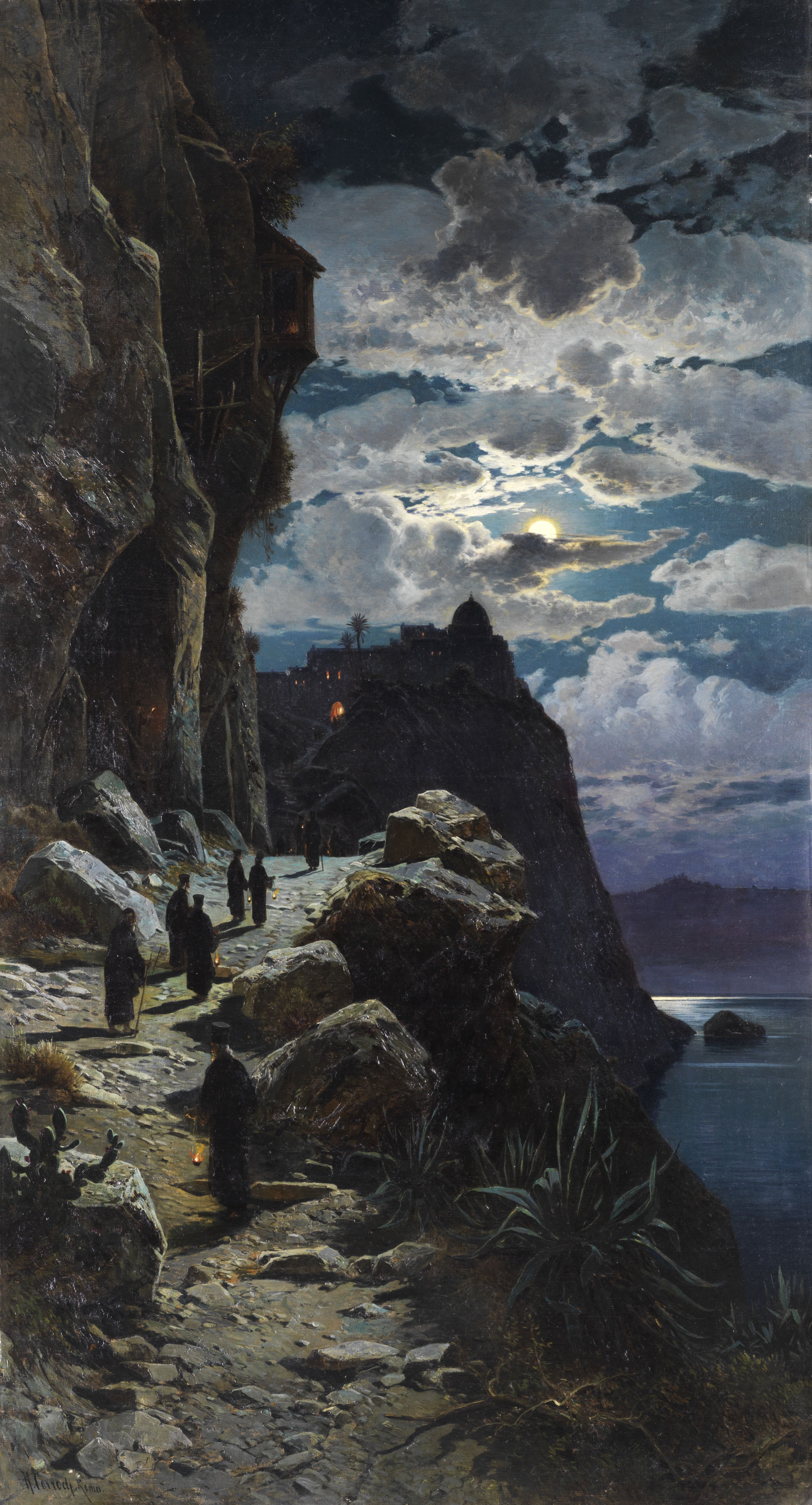
The Monks' Journey to the Mountain Monastery of Athos

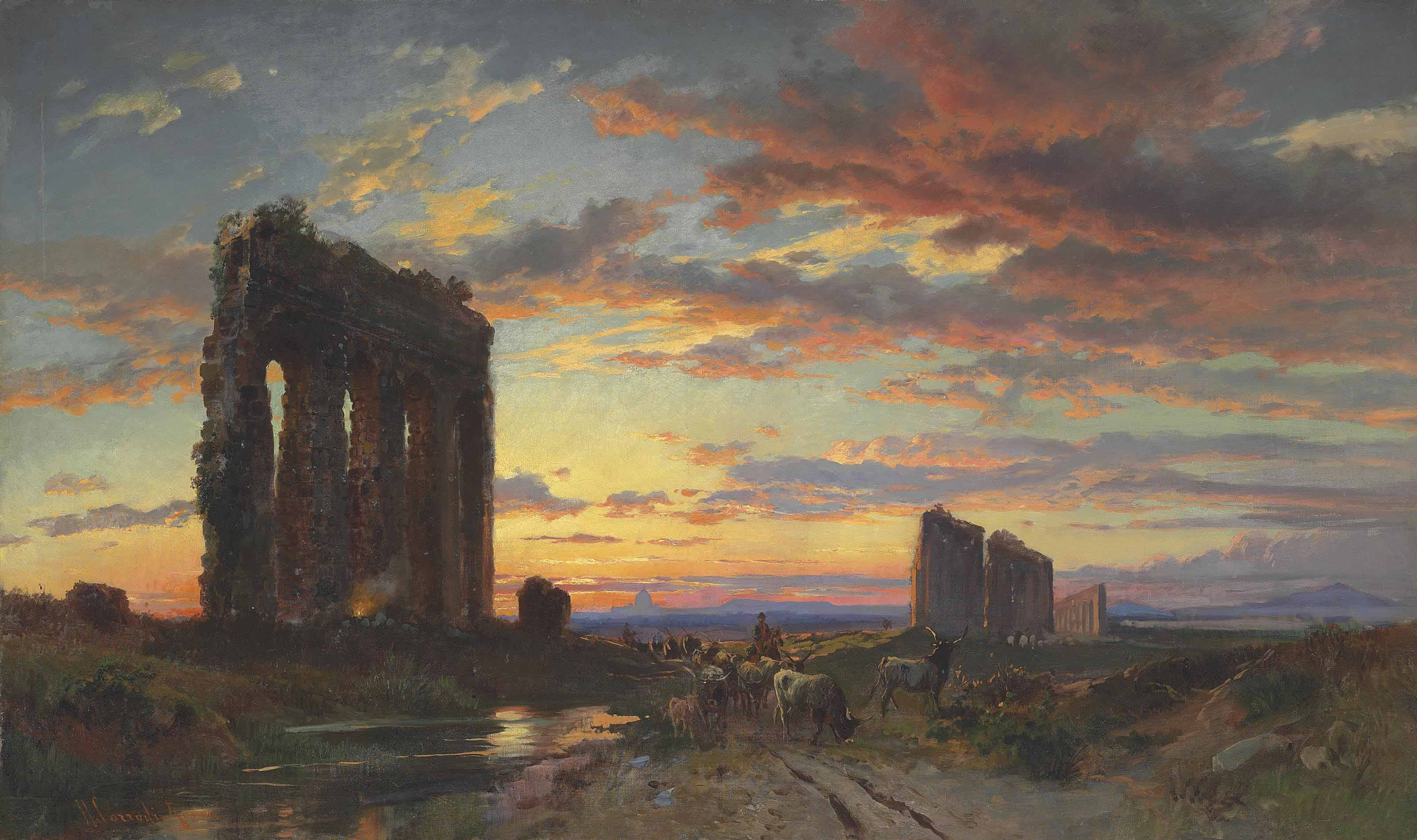
Roman Aqueduct on the Appia Antica at Sunset

== See also ==
- List of Orientalist artists
- Orientalism
