= Juan Cañete =

Paraguayan footballer (born 1929)

Personal information
- Full name: Juan León Cañete Guex
- Date of birth: 27 July 1929
- Place of birth: Paraguay
- Date of death: 20 September 1995 (aged 66)
- Position: Forward

Senior career*
Years	Team	Apps	(Gls)
1950	Presidente Hayes		
1951	Boca Juniors de Cali		
1956-1957	Botafogo		
1958	Vasco da Gama		
1959-1960	Huracán	13	(0)
1961	Temperley	21	(4)
1962	Almagro	4	(0)

International career
1950-1959	Paraguay	21	(0)
- * Club domestic league appearances and goals

Juan León Cañete Guex (27 July 1929 - 20 September 1995) was a Paraguayan football forward.

Cañete started his career in Club Presidente Hayes before playing for Brazilian sides Botafogo and Vasco da Gama, in which he won the Campeonato Carioca. In 1951, he was one of several Paraguayan footballers to play for Boca Juniors de Cali.

At the national team level, Cañete was part of the Paraguay squad that competed in the 1950 FIFA World Cup but didn’t play any game. He also took part in the 1955 Copa America, 1956 Copa America and 1959 Copa America in Argentina.

Cañete is deceased.

== Sources ==
- A.Gowarzewski : "FUJI Football Encyclopedia. World Cup FIFA*part I*Biographical Notes - Heroes of Mundials"; GiA Katowice 1993
