= Gerhard Lusenti =

Swiss footballer (1921-1996)

Personal information
- Date of birth: 24 April 1921
- Place of birth: Zurich, Switzerland
- Date of death: June 1996 (aged 75)
- Position: Defender

Senior career*
Years	Team	Apps	(Gls)
- SC Young Fellows Juventus
- AC Bellinzona

International career
1947–1951	Switzerland	15	(2)
- * Club domestic league appearances and goals

Gerhard Lusenti (24 April 1921 – June 1996) was a Swiss football defender who played for Switzerland in the 1950 FIFA World Cup. He also played for SC Young Fellows Juventus and AC Bellinzona.
