= Octavio Vial =

Mexican football manager

Personal information
- Full name: Octavio Vial de la Llata
- Date of birth: 26 November 1918
- Place of birth: Mexico
- Date of death: 19 January 1989 (aged 70)

Senior career*
Years	Team	Apps	(Gls)
1937–1949	Club América		

Managerial career
- 1949–1950: Club América
- 1950: Mexico
- 1950–1951: Atlante
- 1952–1955: Club América
- 1962–1963: Pumas UNAM
- * Club domestic league appearances and goals

Octavio Vial de la Llata (November 26, 1918 – January 19, 1989) was a Mexican football manager who coached Selección de fútbol de México (Mexico national team) in the 1950 FIFA World Cup. He also coached Atlante, Club América and Club Universidad Nacional, which he promoted as a manager Segunda División to Primera División.
