= Gregorio Gómez =

Mexican footballer (1927–2015)

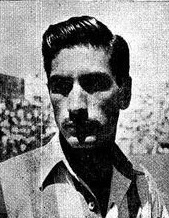
- El Tepa

Personal information
- Full name: Gregorio Gómez Álvarez
- Date of birth: 27 February 1927
- Place of birth: Tepatitlán, Jalisco, Mexico
- Date of death: 24 March 2015 (aged 88)
- Place of death: Guadalajara, Jalisco, Mexico
- Height: 1.75 m (5 ft 9 in)
- Position: Defender

Senior career*
Years	Team	Apps	(Gls)
1948–1954	C.D. Guadalajara		
1954–1960	Atlas		
1960–1968	Pumas de la UNAM		

International career
1949–1960	Mexico	6	(0)
- * Club domestic league appearances and goals

Gregorio Gómez Álvarez (14 February 1927 – 24 March 2015), better known as El Tepa Gómez, was a Mexican footballer who played in the position of lateral defense right and later as central. He played for the C.D. Guadalajara, Atlas F.C. and for the Pumas de la UNAM.

== Trajectory ==
=== C.D. Guadalajara ===
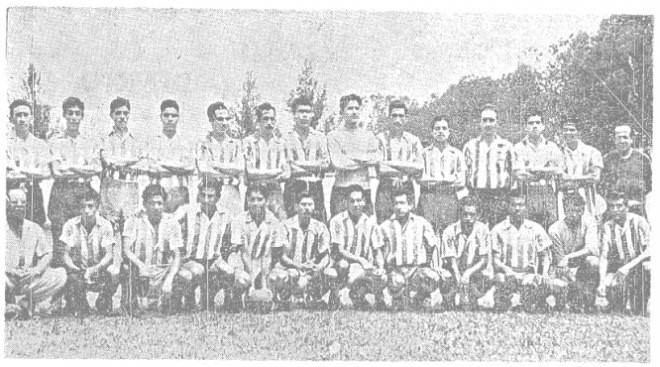
El Tepa in Chivas

He arrived at C.D. Guadalajara, drawn from the local team of his city, Club Tepatitlán (amateur), in the second half of the 1940s, making his debut when the Hungarian Jorge Orth was as coach, making his debut on 15 February 1948, in a game against Club Tampico held in Tampico, Tamaulipas.

His great stature and good football made it very difficult to pass him in the aerial plays, a factor that made him reach the Mexico National Team in which he played in international tournaments and a World Cup.

=== Atlas F.C. ===
He left rojiblanco in August 1954, when his card as a player was released by the club, which would be used by Atlas F.C. who hired him to play with rojinegra.

=== PUMAS de la UNAM ===
Finally in 1960 he would play with the Pumas de la UNAM in this team. He culminated his career as a professional soccer player, obtaining excellent sporting results in the different clubs in which he was a member.

== Mexico national team ==
He made his debut with the Mexico national team on 25 September 1949, in the II North American and Caribbean Cup, at the Sports City stadium in Mexico City. He was one of the first C.D. Guadalajara players to play in a Soccer World Cup, he was summoned along with his teammates Max Prieto and Rodrigo Ruiz for the 1950 World Cup.

However, Gómez and Ruiz were the only ones to play since Prieto would stay on the bench, Gómez played the second game against Yugoslavia and the third game against Switzerland. He was also nominated to participate in the 1954 World Cup but was not in the final call.

Statistics of Gregorio Gómez in the National Team
#	Date	Place	Opponent	Goal	Outcome	Competition
1	19 de julio de 1953	Mexico City, Mexico	Haiti	3	8–0	Qualification for the 1954 Soccer World Cup

=== Participations in World Cups ===
World	Place	Outcome
Soccer World Cup 1950	Brazil	First phase

== Stadium in his Honor ==
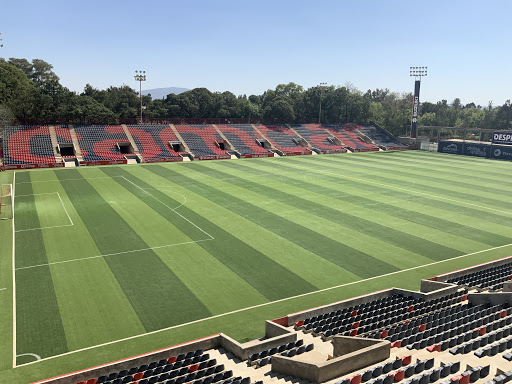
Stadium in his Honor

In Tepatitlán de Morelos, the Municipal Government commemorated him by naming the local stadium the Stadium Tepa Gómez, said stadium that still retains its name and location; where his childhood and youth team plays.

It was inaugurated in September 1970, with the match between Club Tepatitlán vs C.D. Guadalajara with a score of 0–3 in favor of Guadalajara, with 3,200 spectators. With the presence of authorities from the Mexican Football Federation, the Municipal and State Government, in addition to the presence of Gregorio Gómez el "Tepa" † who was named in his honor the stadium, which together with the authorities cut the opening thread .

== Clubs ==
Club	Country	Year
C.D. Guadalajara	Mexico	1948–1954
Atlas F.C.	Mexico	1954–1960
Pumas de la UNAM	Mexico	1960–1968
