= Franco Andreoli =

Swiss footballer (1915-2009)

Personal information
- Date of birth: 2 December 1915
- Place of birth: Switzerland
- Date of death: 5 February 2009 (aged 93)
- Position: Forward

Senior career*
Years	Team	Apps	(Gls)
1935–1947	FC Lugano		

International career
1939–1946	Switzerland	13	(0)

Managerial career
- 1950: Switzerland
- * Club domestic league appearances and goals

Franco Andreoli (2 December 1915 – 5 February 2009) was a Swiss football forward who managed Switzerland in the 1950 FIFA World Cup. He also played for FC Lugano.
