= Miguel Flores (footballer) =

Chilean footballer (1920-2002)

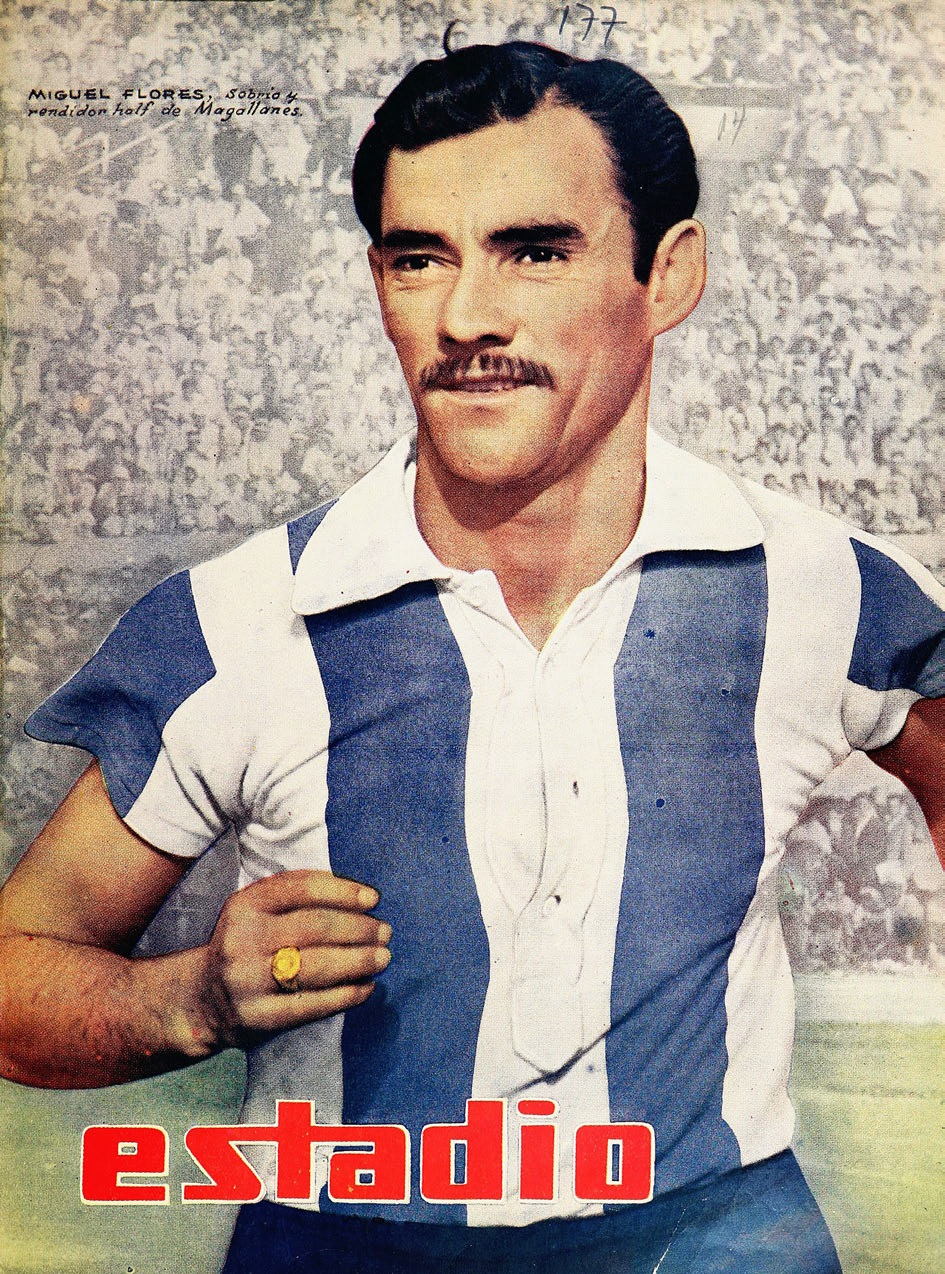

Personal information
- Full name: Miguel Flores Espinoza
- Date of birth: 11 October 1920
- Place of birth: Taltal, Chile
- Date of death: 15 January 2002 (aged 81)
- Position: Defender

Senior career*
Years	Team	Apps	(Gls)
- Club Universidad de Chile

International career
1949	Chile	3	(0)
- * Club domestic league appearances and goals

Miguel Flores Espinoza (11 October 1920 – 15 January 2002) was a Chilean football defender who played for Chile in the 1950 FIFA World Cup. He also played for Club Universidad de Chile.
