= Manuel Gutiérrez (Mexican footballer) =

Mexican footballer (1920–2000)

Personal information
- Full name: Manuel Gutiérrez Hernández
- Date of birth: 8 April 1920
- Place of birth: Mexico
- Date of death: 2000 (aged 80)
- Position: Defender

Senior career*
Years	Team	Apps	(Gls)
- Club América

International career
1950	Mexico	2	(0)
- * Club domestic league appearances and goals

Manuel Gutiérrez Hernández (8 April 1920 – 2000) was a Mexican football league defender.

== Career ==
Gutiérrez played for Mexico in the 1950 FIFA World Cup. He also played for Club América.

== Death ==
Gutiérrez died in 2000, at the age of 80.
