= Marcial Ávalos =

Paraguayan footballer (1921–?)

Personal information
- Date of birth: 5 December 1921
- Place of birth: Paraguay
- Position: Forward

Senior career*
Years	Team	Apps	(Gls)
- Cerro Porteño

International career
- Paraguay
- * Club domestic league appearances and goals

Marcial Ávalos (5 December 1921 –?) was a Paraguayan football forward who played for Paraguay in the 1950 FIFA World Cup. He also played for Cerro Porteño. Ávalos is deceased.
