= Kurt Svensson (footballer) =

Swedish footballer

- Svensson in 1950.

Personal information
- Date of birth: 15 April 1927
- Place of birth: Sweden
- Date of death: 11 July 2016 (aged 89)
- Position: Forward

Senior career*
Years	Team	Apps	(Gls)
- IS Halmia

International career
1950	Sweden B	1	(0)
Medal record
Representing Sweden
FIFA World Cup
Third place	1950 Brazil
- * Club domestic league appearances and goals

Kurt Svensson (15 April 1927 – 11 July 2016) was a Swedish football forward who represented Sweden at the 1950 FIFA World Cup but did not play. He played his club football for IS Halmia.
