= Adolphe Hug =

Swiss footballer (1923-2006)

Personal information
- Date of birth: 23 September 1923
- Place of birth: Zurich, Switzerland
- Date of death: 24 September 2006 (aged 83)
- Position: Goalkeeper

Senior career*
Years	Team	Apps	(Gls)
- Urania Genève Sport
- FC Locarno

International career
1950–1951	Switzerland	5	(0)
- * Club domestic league appearances and goals

Adolphe Hug (23 September 1923 – 24 September 2006) was a Swiss football goalkeeper who played for Switzerland in the 1950 FIFA World Cup. He also played for Urania Genève Sport and FC Locarno.
