= Georges Stuber =

Swiss footballer (1925-2006)

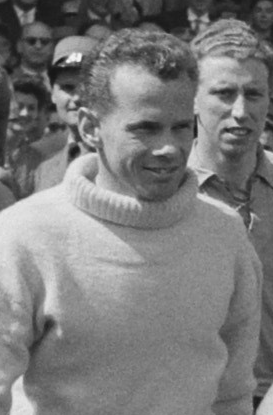
- Georges Stuber, June 1954

Personal information
- Date of birth: 11 May 1925
- Place of birth: Zug, Switzerland
- Date of death: 16 April 2006 (aged 80)
- Position: Goalkeeper

Senior career*
Years	Team	Apps	(Gls)
1946–1948	FC Luzern		
1948–1959	FC Lausanne-Sport		
1959–1961	Servette FC		

International career
1949–1955	Switzerland	14	(0)
- * Club domestic league appearances and goals

Georges Stuber (11 May 1925 – 16 April 2006) was a Swiss footballer who played as a goalkeeper for Switzerland in the 1950 and 1954 FIFA World Cup. He also played for FC Luzern, FC Lausanne-Sport, and Servette FC.
