= Roger Quinche =

Swiss footballer (1922–1982)

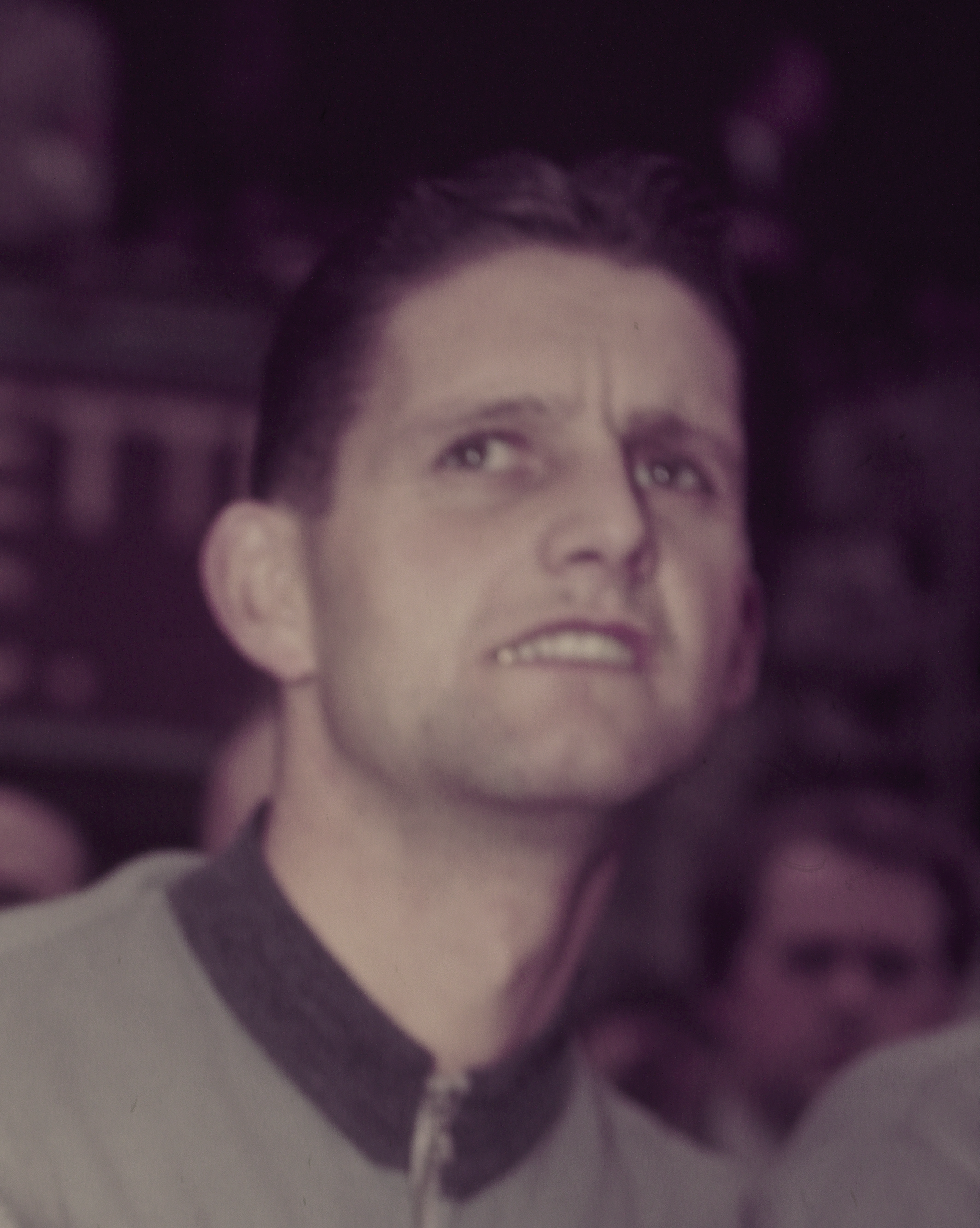
- Quinche in 1959

Personal information
- Date of birth: 22 July 1922
- Date of death: 3 September 1982 (aged 60)
- Height: 1.82 m (6 ft 0 in)
- Position: Midfielder

Senior career*
Years	Team	Apps	(Gls)
- Grasshopper Club Zürich
- FC Bern

International career
1949–1953	Switzerland	11	(0)
- * Club domestic league appearances and goals

Roger Quinche (22 July 1922 – 3 September 1982) was a Swiss footballer who played as a midfielder for Grasshopper Club Zürich and BSC Young Boys. He played for Switzerland in the 1950 FIFA World Cup.
