= Eugen Corrodi =

Swiss footballer (1922-1975)

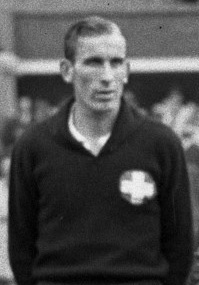

Personal information
- Date of birth: 2 July 1922
- Place of birth: Switzerland
- Date of death: September 7, 1975 (aged 53)
- Position: Goalkeeper

Senior career*
Years	Team	Apps	(Gls)
- FC Lugano

International career
1947–1951	Switzerland	12	(0)
- * Club domestic league appearances and goals

Eugen Corrodi (2 July 1922 – 7 September 1975) was a Swiss football goalkeeper who played for Switzerland in the 1950 FIFA World Cup. He also played for FC Lugano.
