= Oliver Eggimann =

Swiss footballer (1919-2002)

Olivier Eggimann
Personal information
- Date of birth: 28 January 1919
- Place of birth: Switzerland
- Date of death: 6 April 2002 (aged 83)
- Position: Midfielder

Senior career*
Years	Team	Apps	(Gls)
1940–1945	BSC Young Boys		
1945–1948	FC Lausanne-Sport		
1948–1951	Servette FC		
1952	ES FC Malley		
1952–1957	FC La Chaux-de-Fonds		

International career
1941–1955	Switzerland	44	(0)
- * Club domestic league appearances and goals

Olivier Eggimann (28 January 1919 – 6 April 2002) was a Swiss football midfielder who played for Switzerland in the 1950 and 1954 FIFA World Cup. He also played for BSC Young Boys, FC Lausanne-Sport, Servette FC, ES FC Malley, and FC La Chaux-de-Fonds.
