= Roger Bocquet =

Swiss footballer (1921-1994)

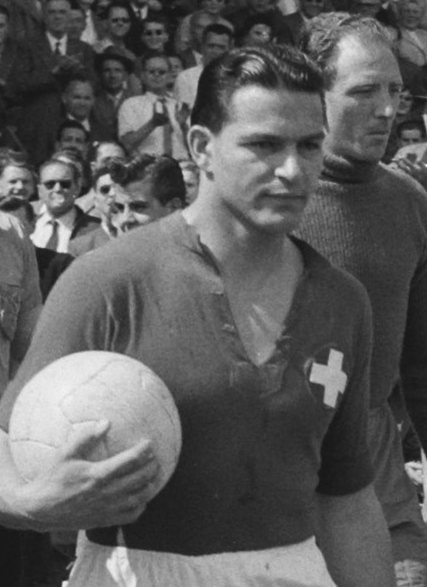
- Roger Bocquet, May 1954

Personal information
- Full name: Roger Bocquet
- Date of birth: 9 April 1921
- Place of birth: Geneva, Switzerland
- Date of death: 10 March 1994 (aged 72)
- Place of death: Geneva, Switzerland
- Position: Defender

International career
Years	Team	Apps	(Gls)
1943–1954	Switzerland	48	(2)

Roger Bocquet (9 April 1921 – 10 March 1994) was a Swiss footballer during the 1940s and 1950s. He played as a half-back and was a participant at the 1950 FIFA World Cup and 1954 FIFA World Cup. He insisted on playing during the 1954 World Cup (and played all four matches) despite suffering from a brain tumour. He was later operated on and recovered.

Bocquet won 48 caps for Switzerland in total and scored 2 goals. He played his club football for the Lausanne Sports Club.

He died in March 1994.
