= André Neury =

Swiss footballer (1921-2007)

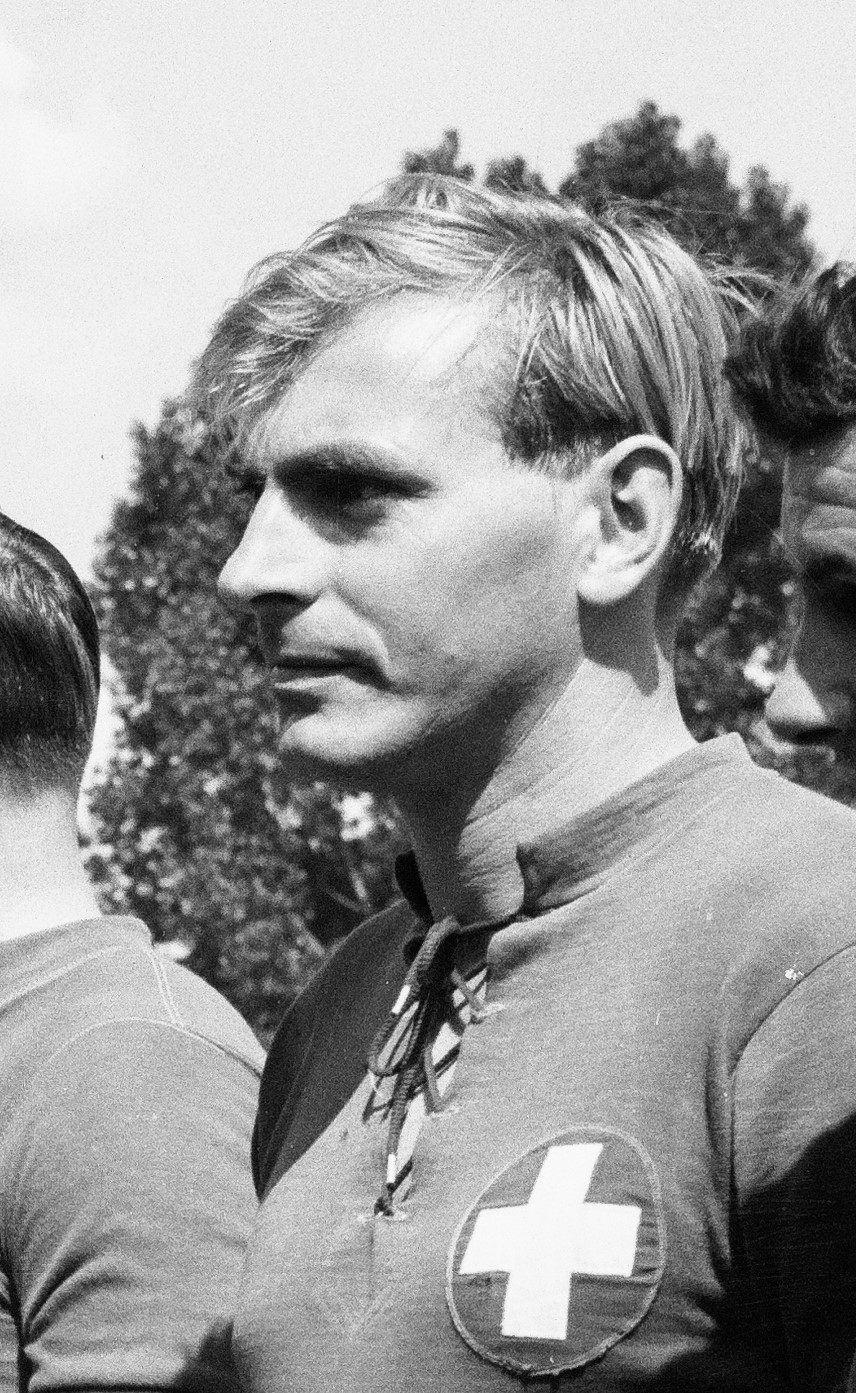
- André Neury in 1954

Personal information
- Date of birth: 3 September 1921
- Place of birth: Geneva, Switzerland
- Date of death: 16 October 2007 (aged 86)
- Place of death: Minusio, Switzerland
- Height: 1.73 m (5 ft 8 in)
- Positions: Defender; right winger

Senior career*
| Years | Team | Apps | (Gls) |
| –1941 | FC La Chaux-de-Fonds | | |
| 1941–1943 | Servette FC | | (10) |
| 1943–1947 | FC La Chaux-de-Fonds | | |
| 1947–1951 | FC Locarno | | |
| 1951–1955 | Servette FC | | |

International career
| 1945–1954 | Switzerland | 30 | (0) |
- * Club domestic league appearances and goals

André Neury (3 September 1921 – 16 October 2007) was a Swiss football defender who played for Switzerland in the 1950 and 1954 FIFA World Cups. He also played for FC La Chaux-de-Fonds, FC Locarno, and Servette FC.
