= Felipe Zetter =

Mexican footballer (1923-2013)

Personal information
- Full name: Felipe Zetter Zetter
- Date of birth: 3 July 1923
- Place of birth: Guanajuato, Mexico
- Date of death: 15 March 2013 (aged 89)
- Place of death: Guadalajara, Mexico
- Position: Defender

Senior career*
Years	Team	Apps	(Gls)
- Irapuato FC
- Club Atlas

International career
1949–1950	Mexico	5	(0)
- * Club domestic league appearances and goals

Felipe Zetter Zetter (3 July 1923 – 15 March 2013) was a Mexican football defender who played for Mexico national team in the 1950 FIFA World Cup.

== Career ==
Zetter played as a defender for Club Atlas, captaining the side to its first Mexican Primera División championship in 1951.

== Distinction ==
Felipe is the first footballer from Guanajuato to participate in a FIFA World Cup (1950).
