= 1947 NAFC Championship squads =

These are the squads for the countries that played in the 1947 NAFC Championship.

The age listed for each player is on 13 July 1947, the first day of the tournament. The numbers of caps and goals listed for each player do not include any matches played after the start of the tournament. The club listed is the club for which the player last played a competitive match before the tournament. The nationality for each club reflects the national association (not the league) to which the club is affiliated. A flag is included for coaches who are of a different nationality than their own national team.

== Cuba ==
Head coach: Juan Vázquez Penabad

No.	Pos.	Player	Date of birth (age)	Caps	Goals	Club
-	GK	Juan Ayra	23 June 1913 (aged 34)	6	0	(Football Association of Cuba) Puentes Grandes
-	GK	Pedro Pablo Arozemena		0	0	(Football Association of Cuba) Juventud Asturiana
-	GK	Joaquín Torroella		0	0	(Football Association of Cuba) Puentes Grandes
-	DF	Jacinto Barquín	3 September 1915 (aged 31)	8	2	(Football Association of Cuba) Puentes Grandes
-	DF	Ramon Cruz Díez		0	0	(Football Association of Cuba) Puentes Grandes
-	DF	Enrique Martínez Pérez		0	0	(Football Association of Cuba) Juventud Asturiana
-	DF	Pedro Cotalero		0	0	(Football Association of Cuba) Puentes Grandes
-	MF	José Minsal		0	0	(Football Association of Cuba) Puentes Grandes
-	MF	Francisco Álvarez López		0	0	Free agent
-	MF	Armando Granados		0	0	(Football Association of Cuba) Puentes Grandes
-	MF	José Ovide		0	0	(Football Association of Cuba) Puentes Grandes
-	MF	Marcelino Minsal		0	0	(Football Association of Cuba) Puentes Grandes
-	FW	Jesús Villalón	5 July 1914 (aged 33)	0	0	(Football Association of Cuba) Centro Gallego
-	FW	Vicente Pérez López		0	0	(Football Association of Cuba) Iberia Havana
-	FW	Ricardo Mederos		0	0	(Football Association of Cuba) Iberia Havana
-	FW	Armando Buxadera		0	0	(Football Association of Cuba) Litobana
-	FW	Luis Gironella		0	0	(Football Association of Cuba) Juventud Asturiana
-	FW	Manuel Brioso		0	0	(Football Association of Cuba) Puentes Grandes
-	FW	Roberto Roure		0	0	Free agent

== Mexico ==
Head coach: (Hungary) György Orth

No.	Pos.	Player	Date of birth (age)	Caps	Goals	Club
-	GK	Raúl Landeros		0	0	(Mexican Football Federation) Tampico
-	GK	Federico Villavicencio		0	0	(Mexican Football Federation) Atlante
-	DF	Sergio Bravo	27 November 1927 (aged 19)	6	0	(Mexican Football Federation) Real España
-	DF	Juan Gómez	26 June 1924 (aged 23)	0	0	(Mexican Football Federation) Atlas
-	DF	Alfonso Montemayor	28 April 1922 (aged 25)	0	0	(Mexican Football Federation) León
-	DF	Alberto Medina Villalobos		0	0	(Mexican Football Federation) Atlante
-	MF	Rafael Orozco	8 May 1922 (aged 25)	0	0	(Mexican Football Federation) Guadalajara
-	MF	Juan Jasso	21 August 1926 (aged 20)	0	0	(Mexican Football Federation) Guadalajara
-	MF	Rodrigo Ruiz	14 April 1923 (aged 24)	0	0	(Mexican Football Federation) Guadalajara
-	MF	Mario Ochoa	7 November 1927 (aged 19)	0	0	(Mexican Football Federation) Club América
-	MF	Salvador Arizméndi		0	0	(Mexican Football Federation) Atlante
-	FW	Max Prieto	28 March 1919 (aged 28)	0	0	(Mexican Football Federation) Guadalajara
-	FW	Javier de la Torre	19 December 1923 (aged 23)	0	0	(Mexican Football Federation) Guadalajara
-	FW	Antonio Flores	13 July 1923 (aged 24)	0	0	(Mexican Football Federation) Atlas
-	FW	Adalberto López	4 July 1923 (aged 24)	0	0	(Mexican Football Federation) León
-	FW	Carlos Septién	18 January 1923 (aged 24)	0	0	(Mexican Football Federation) Real España
-	FW	Octavio Vial	26 November 1918 (aged 28)	0	0	(Mexican Football Federation) Real España
-	FW	Luis Reyes Ayala	1914 (aged 32–33)	0	0	(Mexican Football Federation) Guadalajara
-	FW	Julián Durán		0	0	(Mexican Football Federation) Real España
-	FW	Ángel Segura		0	0	(Mexican Football Federation) Atlante

== United States ==
Head coach: Andrew M. Brown

No.	Pos.	Player	Date of birth (age)	Caps	Goals	Club
-	GK	Walter Romanowicz	24 April 1918 (aged 29)	0	0	(United States Soccer Federation) Ponta Delgada
-	DF	Joe Ferreira	24 April 1916 (aged 31)	0	0	(United States Soccer Federation) Ponta Delgada
-	DF	Manuel Martin	29 December 1917 (aged 29)	0	0	(United States Soccer Federation) Ponta Delgada
-	DF	Joseph Rego-Costa	3 July 1919 (aged 28)	0	0	(United States Soccer Federation) Ponta Delgada
-	DF	Joseph Michaels	3 December 1915 (aged 31)	2	0	(United States Soccer Federation) Ponta Delgada
-	DF	John Machado	4 January 1912 (aged 35)	0	0	(United States Soccer Federation) Ponta Delgada
-	DF	Joe Machado		0	0	(United States Soccer Federation) Ponta Delgada
-	MF	Vincent Lucianno		0	0	(United States Soccer Federation) Ponta Delgada
-	MF	Jim Delgado		0	0	(United States Soccer Federation) Ponta Delgada
-	MF	Jesse Braga	3 January 1918 (aged 29)	0	0	(United States Soccer Federation) Ponta Delgada
-	MF	John Travis	24 January 1917 (aged 30)	0	0	(United States Soccer Federation) Ponta Delgada
-	FW	Ed Souza	22 September 1921 (aged 25)	0	0	(United States Soccer Federation) Ponta Delgada
-	FW	Frank Moniz	26 September 1911 (aged 35)	0	0	(United States Soccer Federation) Ponta Delgada
-	FW	John Souza	12 July 1920 (aged 27)	0	0	(United States Soccer Federation) Ponta Delgada
-	FW	Ed Valentine	23 November 1914 (aged 32)	0	0	(United States Soccer Federation) Ponta Delgada
