= Michaels (surname) =

- Pronunciation: /ˈmaɪkəlz/ MY-kəlz

Origin
- Origin: Michael
- Meaning: form of 'Who is like God'
- Region of origin: Hebrew

Other names
- Variant forms: Michels, Michals, St. Michaels

Michaels is a patronymic surname meaning "son of Michael". The root Michael- comes from Hebrew: מִיכָאֵל / מיכאל [miχaˈʔel], meaning "Who is like God?". A common English language surname, it is rare as a given name. There are other spellings. People with the name Michaels include:

== Academics ==
- Patrick Michaels (1950–2022), American research professor specializing on the influence of climate on agriculture

== Arts and entertainment ==
- Al Michaels (born 1944), American television sportscaster
- Barry Michaels (born 1952), American radio personality
- Bret Michaels (born 1963), American lead vocalist of the band Poison
- Dan Michaels (born 1963), American producer, record company owner, saxophonist/Lyriconist; member of the rock band The Choir
- David Michaels (actor) (born 1964), British actor
- Hilly Michaels (1948–2025), American musician
- Jesse Michaels (born 1969), American songwriter, guitarist and artist
- Jim Michaels (born 1965), American television producer
- Julia Michaels (born 1993), American singer and songwriter
- Kevin Sean Michaels (born ?), producer
- Lorne Michaels (born 1944), Canadian television producer, writer and comedian
- Margaret Michaels (born ?), American actress
- Mia Michaels (born 1966), American choreographer
- Nick Michaels (born ?), Canadian broadcaster, writer, actor and producer
- Randy Michaels (born ?), American broadcaster and entrepreneur
- Robert Michaels
- Sean Michaels (writer) (born 1982), Canadian writer and novelist
- Sean Michaels (pornographic actor) (born 1958), American pornographic actor
- Tammy Lynn Michaels (born 1974), American actress
- Trina Michaels (born 1982), American actress
- Mihael, Lord Michaels

== Business ==
- Howard Michaels (1955–2018), American real estate businessman

== Literary ==
- Fern Michaels (born 1933), American novelist
- James Michaels (1921–2007), American journalist and Forbes Magazine editor
- Leigh Michaels (born 1954), American novelist
- Leonard Michaels (1933–2003), American writer
- Walter Benn Michaels (born 1948), American literary theorist

== Sports ==
- Chris Michaels (born 1961), American professional wrestler
- Cody Michaels (born ?), American wrestler
- Jason Michaels (born 1976), American MLB outfielder
- Jillian Michaels (born 1974), American fitness expert and TV personality
- Joseph Michaels (born ?), American soccer player
- Lou Michaels (1935–2016), American football player
- Meredith Michaels-Beerbaum (born 1969), American, equestrian show jumper for Germany
- Owen Michaels (born 2002), American ice hockey player
- Rick Michaels (born 1974), American professional wrestler
- Shawn Michaels (born 1965), American professional wrestler
- Stephen Michaels (born 1987), Australian rugby player
- Walt Michaels (1929–2019), American, former football player, former head coach of New York Jets

== Fictional characters ==
- Anne, Eric, and Richard Michaels, a character in the 1989 American science-fiction drama movie Beyond the Stars

== Other ==
- The Michaels, Canadians, public name used to refer to the duo of Michael Stark and Michael Leshner
- Mark A. Michaels and Patricia Johnson, writers on sexuality and relationships
