= Walter Roman =

Walter Roman may refer to:

- Valter Roman, Romanian communist activist and soldier
- Walter G. Roman, American engineer and inventor
- Walter Romanowicz, American soccer goalkeeper
- Walter Roman (rugby), English rugby union and rugby league footballer
