= The Game of Their Lives (2005 film) =

Film by David Anspaugh

- Original poster
- Directed by: David Anspaugh
- Written by: Angelo Pizzo
- Based on: The Game of Their Lives by Geoffrey Douglas
- Produced by: Howard Baldwin; Karen Baldwin; Ginger T. Perkins; Peter Newman
- Starring: Gerard Butler; Wes Bentley; Jay Rodan; Gavin Rossdale; Patrick Stewart; Terry Kinney; John Rhys-Davies
- Cinematography: Johnny E. Jensen
- Edited by: Bud S. Smith; Scott Smith; Ian Crafford; Lee Grubin
- Music by: William Ross
- Distributed by: IFC Films
- Release date: April 22, 2005
- Running time: 101 minutes
- Country: United States
- Language: English
- Budget: $13 million
- Box office: $388,998

The Game of Their Lives (released on DVD as The Miracle Match) is a 2005 American drama film directed by David Anspaugh. The screenplay by Angelo Pizzo is based on the 1996 book of the same title by Geoffrey Douglas.

== Plot ==
The film is based on the true story of the 1950 U.S. soccer team which, against all odds, beat England 1–0 in the city of Belo Horizonte during the 1950 FIFA World Cup. The story is about the family traditions and passions that shaped the players who made up this team of underdogs. One group of teammates were from The Hill neighborhood of St. Louis, Missouri. Another group came from the Corky Row district of Fall River, Massachusetts.

== Cast ==
- Gerard Butler as Frank Borghi, from St. Louis
- Wes Bentley as Walter Bahr, from Philadelphia
- Jay Rodan as Frank Wallace, from St. Louis
- Gavin Rossdale as Stanley Mortensen, on English team
- Costas Mandylor as Charlie Colombo, from St. Louis
- Louis Mandylor as Gino Pariani, from St. Louis
- Zachery Ty Bryan as Harry Keough, from St. Louis
- Jimmy Jean-Louis as Joe Gaetjens, from Haiti
- Richard Jenik as Joe Maca
- Nelson Vargas as John Souza
- Nino Da Silva as Eddie Souza
- John Harkes as Ed McIlvenny
- Bill Smitrovich as Admiral Higgins
- Terry Kinney as Dent McSkimming
- Patrick Stewart as older Dent McSkimming
- John Rhys-Davies as Bill Jeffrey
- Tim Vickery as BBC announcer

== Production ==
In September 1996, Douglas' book was published. In November 1996, the film rights to it were purchased by producer Peter Newman. Newman was unable to secure financing for production, however, and finally sold the rights to Philip Anschutz, one of the founders of Major League Soccer. Anschutz wanted to generate interest in the fledgling soccer league, and hired Pizzo to write the screenplay and Anspaugh to direct.

Anspaugh was initially hesitant, thinking that the success of his previous sports films (Hoosiers and Rudy) would be difficult to top and that a film about soccer would not be warmly received in the U.S. Coincidentally, the same day that Anspaugh was approached about the film, Pizzo was discussing the 1950 match with Indiana Hoosiers men's soccer coach Jerry Yeagley.

Casting began in September 2002. The actors were chosen mostly for their soccer skills. Scotsman Gerard Butler, for example, grew up playing the game, although he portrayed a goalkeeper in the film. Wes Bentley was the only major exception. American international soccer player Eric Wynalda served as a technical consultant, and another American player, John Harkes, appeared in the film.

The film only had an initial budget of $13 million, which meant that they were unable to film many scenes about the players' back-stories. Principal photography took place in St. Louis, Missouri, and several of the surviving members of the U.S. 1950 World Cup frequently visited the set. Gino Pariani's son appeared in a bit role.

== Release ==
=== Theatrical run ===
The film was distributed by IFC Films and was released on April 22, 2005. It only grossed $388,998 worldwide, with nearly 97% of that coming from the U.S.

=== Reception ===
The Game of Their Lives received mostly negative reviews from critics. Review aggregator Rotten Tomatoes gives the film a score of 26% based on reviews from 35 critics, and reports an average rating of 4.6 out of 10. At Metacritic, which assigns a weighted average score out of 100 to reviews from mainstream critics, the film received an average score of 47% based on 13 reviews.

Roger Ebert awarded the film one-and-a-half out of four stars and said, "This is a sluggish and dutiful film that plays more like a eulogy than an adventure."

== Historical inaccuracies ==
- The film strongly implies that the St. Louis players and East Coast players first came together during a trial game portrayed in film. However several of the players had previously represented the United States at the 1949 NAFC Championship, a tournament which had acted as a 1950 FIFA World Cup qualifier. This tournament is never mentioned in film.
- The game played against England was actually the second match that the U.S. had played in the 1950 World Cup. They had been defeated 3–1 four days earlier by Spain.
- Scotsman Ed McIlvenny was edited out of the captaincy he held in the match against England, as the producers of the film decided to give the position of captain to American-born Walter Bahr. Bahr commented, "I was captain for about 10 years including the 1950 World Cup. But when we got to Brazil the first game was against Spain and since my teammate Harry Keough spoke Spanish, they made him captain. Against England, our coach Bill Jeffrey, who was also Scottish-born, thought it would be a big feather in Eddie's cap to be captain. It was an honor for him and I think that was the proper thing to do. I was then captain for the last game against Chile and for years to come. Yet in the film I'm captain, and that's wrong. I know Eddie's widow lives in East Sussex, and it is important she should know that an error has been made and Eddie really was the captain against England." McIlvenny's widow, Sheila, was reported as saying: "It's disappointing, but what do you expect from Hollywood?...It is not the true story, not at all. I think he [McIlvenny] would have accepted it, but I don't think he would have been happy with it because it wasn't the truth".
- Joe Gaetjens was of mixed German-Haitian descent and had a lighter skin complexion than the actor portraying him. He also did not practice voodoo, but like most Haitians, he was Catholic.
- It was actually Stanley Matthews, not Stanley Mortensen who was part of the team that was traveling through North America prior to the World Cup. However, he did not play in the game against the U.S. in New York because of injury. Furthermore, the touring team won with a score of 1–0; it was not a rout as depicted in the film. Also in the after-dinner speech Mortensen is congratulated on his feat of scoring three goals in the FA Cup final, a feat that he accomplished in 1953.
- Joe Gaetjens was not the only player not to have a U.S. passport available, since Joseph Maca and Ed McIlvenny were Belgian and Scottish respectively. Maca did however obtain U.S. nationality a few years later.
- In fact the U.S. was listed in the odds for winning the tournament (they were listed as 500–1).
- The attendance of the England–U.S. game was just over 10,000, not 30,000. Though this still was a much bigger crowd than the U.S. players were used to, several of them (namely Bahr, Borghi, Colombo, Keough, John Souza and Wallace) had played in front of crowds up to 60,000 spectators during the 1949 NAFC Championship in Mexico, so this crowd wasn't the biggest they had ever played in front of.
- The reason Stanley Matthews was omitted from the England squad was because Arthur Drewry, head of the English Football League, decided to keep the same team that had won against Chile, not because "he was taking a holiday in Rio". Matthews was in fact present in the stadium in Belo Horizonte during the game.
- Frank Borghi is seen to be taking several goal kicks throughout the film, though he stated that never actually did this, as he always threw the ball or let another player take the goal kick.
- An older Dent McSkimming is seen at the beginning of the film at the 2004 MLS All-Star Game, when in reality McSkimming had died in 1976.
- "Admiral" Higgins in the film was actually an Air Force lieutenant general.

== See also ==
- List of association football films
