= Edward Valentine =

Edward or Ed Valentine may refer to:

- Edward Virginius Valentine (1838–1930), American sculptor
- Edward K. Valentine (1843–1916), U.S. Representative from Nebraska
- Edward R. Valentine, at one time CEO of J. W. Robinson's department store
- Ed Valentine, American soccer player

== See also ==
- Edward Valentine Blomfield (1788–1816), classical scholar
