= Jesse Braga =

American soccer player (1918–2006)

Jesse Braga (January 3, 1918 – June 16, 2006) was an American soccer player. He played for Ponta Delgada S.C. of Fall River, Massachusetts which won the both 1947 National Challenge Cup and 1947 National Amateur Cup. Based on these result, the U.S. Soccer Federation selected the club to act as the U.S. national team at the 1947 NAFC Championship. As a result, Braga earned two caps with the U.S. national team. In the first game, the U.S. lost 5–0 to Mexico and in the second, they lost 5–2 to Cuba. Braga died on June 16, 2006, at the age of 88.
