= John Travis (soccer) =

American soccer player

John Travis (January 24, 1917 – September 26, 2005) was an American soccer player. He played for the Fall River, Massachusetts Ponta Delgada S.C. which won both the 1947 National Challenge Cup and National Amateur Cup. Based on these result, the U.S. Soccer Federation selected the club to act as the U.S. national team at the 1947 NAFC Championship. As a result, Travis earned two caps with the U.S. national team. In the first game, the U.S. 5-0 to Mexico and in the second, they lost 5–2 to Cuba.
