= Rickey Hill =

American baseball player (born 1957)

- First baseman / Outfielder
- Born: August 15, 1957 (age 69); Fort Worth, Texas
- Batted: Right Threw: Right

Pioneer League debut
- 1975, for the Montreal Expos

Last Northwest League appearance
- 1978, for the Grays Harbor Loggers

Career statistics
- Batting average: .301
- Home runs: 126
- Runs batted in: 319

Teams
- Montreal Expos (1975); Rio Grande Valley White Wings (1976); Texas City Stars (1977); Grays Harbor Loggers (1978)

Career highlights and awards
- Northwest League Championship (1978)

Rickey Glen Hill (born August 15, 1957) is an American former professional baseball outfielder and first baseman who played a four-year Minor League Baseball career from 1975 to 1982 after being signed to the Montreal Expos.

His life and career was the subject of the 2023 American biographical sports drama film The Hill, starring Colin Ford as Hill.

== Early life ==
Hill was born in Fort Worth, Texas in 1957to Baptist pastor James Hill and wife Helen. He attended Haltom High School. As a child, he was diagnosed with a genetic degenerative spine disorder, which required him to undergo several surgeries and wear leg braces.

== Career ==
Hill notably scaled a 10-foot wall of a stadium to get into a scouting camp in order to meet scout and former player Red Murff, which led to him playing in the tryout game, where he went 11-for-11.

Hill was signed to the Montreal Expos in 1975. He played in their minor league farm system in 1975 for the Lethbridge Expos as an outfielder alongside Andre Dawson. Hill then played in the Gulf States League for the Rio Grande Valley White Wings in 1976. In 1977, he played in the Lone Star League for the Texas City Stars.

In 1978, Hill played for the Grays Harbor Loggers, scoring the most home runs on the Northwest League championship-winning team. He hit 15 home runs for the season, which was two behind Albert Richmond for the Northwest League lead, and had an average of .286 at the plate. Hill had never received his Northwest League championship ring, until 2015 when it was recovered by the son of a Loggers fan, 37 years later.

Hill retired from baseball after the 1979 season at the age of 22, due to complications from his genetic spine disorder.

== Personal life ==
Hill married his high school sweetheart, Sherran Lambert, during a ceremony at home plate at Henderson Stadium in August 1975.

Hill lives in Fort Worth, Texas and works as an employee benefits specialist.
