= Joe Machado =

American soccer player

Joe Machado is an American former soccer defender. He played for the Fall River, Massachusetts Ponta Delgada S.C. which won the 1947 National Challenge Cup and National Amateur Cup. Based on these result, the U.S. Soccer Federation selected the club to act as the U.S. national team at the 1947 NAFC Championship. As a result, Machado earned two caps with the U.S. national team. In the first game, the U.S. lost 5–0 to Mexico and in the second, they lost 5–2 to Cuba.
