= The Score (2001 film) =

2001 film by Frank Oz

- Theatrical release poster
- Directed by: Frank Oz
- Screenplay by: Daniel E. Taylor; Kario Salem; Lem Dobbs; Scott Marshall Smith
- Story by: Daniel E. Taylor; Kario Salem
- Produced by: Gary Foster; Lee Rich
- Starring: Robert De Niro; Edward Norton; Angela Bassett; Marlon Brando
- Cinematography: Rob Hahn
- Edited by: Richard Pearson
- Music by: Howard Shore
- Production company: Mandalay Pictures
- Distributed by: Paramount Pictures (Note: While Paramount Pictures handled the film's distribution in select territories, Summit Entertainment handled its international distribution.)
- Release date: July 13, 2001
- Running time: 124 minutes
- Country: United States
- Languages: English; French
- Budget: $68 million
- Box office: $113.5 million

The Score is a 2001 American heist film directed by Frank Oz and starring Robert De Niro, Edward Norton, Angela Bassett and Marlon Brando (in his final film role). It is the only time that Brando and De Niro appear onscreen together. The screenplay is based on a story by Daniel E. Taylor and Kario Salem. The film was released in the United States on July 13, 2001.

== Plot ==
After being nearly caught during a burglary, master safe-cracker Nick Wells considers retiring to live with his girlfriend Diane and run his Montreal jazz club as a legitimate businessman. He declines another job from his fence Max, and is approached by the job's mastermind Jack Teller, an ambitious fellow thief. Nick sends his associate Burt to intimidate Jack to leave town, but Jack gains the upper hand and arrives at Nick's home to change his mind. Nick agrees to join the heist in exchange for total control of the operation, and negotiates a $6 million cut from Max.

Their target is a royal sceptre smuggled into Canada but discovered by customs, now stored in the ultra-secure basement of the Montreal Customs House. Jack has infiltrated the Customs House by posing as a hired mentally challenged janitor, and Nick finds access to the basement through the sewers beneath. Diane, disappointed that Nick has taken on this final score, reconsiders their future together.

Nick recruits Steven, a hacker associate, who breaks into the Customs House's security company's system to obtain bypass codes, but is caught by a systems administrator who demands $50,000 for the information. The administrator arranges to meet in a public park, bringing his cousin for protection, but tensions arise when the cousin and Jack each reveal that they have brought a gun, to Nick's displeasure, but the exchange is made.

After seeing a pressurized beer keg burst open in the street, Nick concocts a plan to defeat the Customs House's impregnable safe. He frustrates Jack by urging patience and refusing to let him be part of the handoff with Max, despite Jack's insistence. Advised by Burt that the job may be too risky, Nick confronts Max, who confesses that he is deeply in debt to a mob boss but is secretly selling the sceptre for $30 million. Max implores him to finish the job, and Nick reluctantly agrees.

The Customs House adds additional closed-circuit television cameras and infrared detectors to the basement after realizing the sceptre's true value as a French national treasure, forcing the thieves to forward their timetable. Jack arrives for his graveyard shift—with his gun hidden inside a portable radio—while Nick breaks into the basement through the sewer tunnels. Burt, posing as a garbage truck driver, delivers computer components that Jack uses to bypass the security system. Jack shuts off the cameras as Nick enters the storage room, but a fellow janitor encounters Jack, who locks him in a closet at gunpoint.

Bypassing the infrared sensors, Nick fills the safe with water from the basement sprinkler system and inserts an explosive charge, blowing off the door. He packs the sceptre in a carrying case but is held at gunpoint by Jack, who forces him to hand over the case. As rigged by Jack, the cameras and alarms are powered up again, alerting security and forcing Nick to escape through the sewers. Jack returns upstairs, hiding the case inside his uniform and slipping past the police as they arrive.

Arriving at a bus station to flee the city, Jack calls Nick to gloat, but Nick reveals that he anticipated his betrayal: he had already planned a route through the sewers to evade pursuit, and Jack opens the case to discover a scrap-metal decoy; Nick has the real sceptre. Brushing off Jack's threats of vengeance, Nick advises him to flee as "every cop in the city" will now be looking for him.

Later, Max smiles as he watches a news broadcast reporting a massive manhunt to find Jack, the prime suspect whose accomplice has "vanished without a trace", while Nick reunites with Diane at Montréal-Mirabel International Airport.

== Cast ==
- Robert De Niro as Nick Wells
- Edward Norton as Jack Teller / Brian
- Marlon Brando as Max
- Angela Bassett as Diane
- Gary Farmer as Burt
- Jamie Harrold as Steven
- Paul Soles as Danny
- Serge Houde as Laurent
- Martin Drainville as Jean-Claude
- Richard Waugh as Sapperstein
- Mark Camacho as Sapperstein's Cousin Eric

The soundtrack includes onscreen musical performances by Mose Allison and Cassandra Wilson.

== Production ==
During the production, Marlon Brando repeatedly argued with Frank Oz and called him "Miss Piggy", the Muppet whom Oz played from 1976 to 2001. Brando's eccentric behavior on set included performing scenes in his underwear and, at times, refusing to be directed by Oz altogether, and having co-star Robert De Niro take over with Oz instructing via an assistant director, an allegation that Oz confirmed. During the scene where Brando and De Niro are sitting together, Brando asked for De Niro to direct the scene, as he hated Oz. De Niro was not prepared to direct, but stated afterwards that it turned out fine. "There was one scene—two days of shooting—when Marlon was too upset with me to act while I was on the set," Oz stated. "I watched from outside, with a monitor, and Bob was very good and acted as mediator between us."

Screenwriter Scott Marshall Smith joined the crew late and received a writing credit.

Oz downplayed the conflict after the film's release, taking unspoken note of the reported tension between himself and Brando on the movie's Montreal set:

He's a very sweet, gracious—childlike in some ways—very, very humane, very complex person. But I can't say that we got along all the time. And it wasn't because he was difficult; it was a difficult situation. I don't want to do a puffery piece here, I want to be flat-out true: We had a difference in creative interpretation of the role. He felt one way, quite sincerely and earnestly, and I felt the other, and the producers backed me, which I'm grateful for, and Marlon did come around to my side.

Oz later blamed himself for the tension and cited his tendency to be confrontational rather than nurturing in response to Brando's acting style.

== Home media ==
The film was released on VHS and DVD on December 11, 2001. First Blu-ray release was August 31, 2010 and on October 11, 2022 it was released on Ultra HD Blu-ray.

== Reception ==
=== Box office ===
In its opening weekend, the film opened at number 2 in the U.S. box office, raking in $19 million, behind Legally Blonde. After its debut on July 13, 2001, the $68 million film earned a gross domestic box-office income of $71,107,711. Combined with the international box office, the worldwide total is $113,579,918.

=== Critical response ===
On Rotten Tomatoes, the film has an approval rating of 74%, based on 129 reviews, with an average rating of 6.5/10. The website's critical consensus reads: "Though the movie treads familiar ground in the heist/caper genre, De Niro, Norton, and Brando make the movie worth watching." On Metacritic, the film has a weighted average score of 71 out of 100 based on 29 critics, indicating "generally favorable" reviews. Audiences polled by CinemaScore gave the film an average grade of "B" on a scale of A+ to F.

Roger Ebert of the Chicago Sun-Times gave it three-and-a-half stars out of four, calling it "the best pure heist movie in recent years". Steven Rosen of The Denver Post stated that "after sitting through such sloppy and reckless high-concept heist films as Mission: Impossible and Entrapment, it's refreshing to witness the careful, methodical attention to details that distinguishes The Score."

Peter Travers, film critic for Rolling Stone, pointed out that when "two Don Corleones team up", he expected "the kind of movie that makes people say, 'I'd pay to see these guys just read from the phone book'". However, he concluded, "There's nothing you can't see coming in this flick, including the surprise ending. Quick, somebody get a phone book."

=== Accolades ===
Angela Bassett won an NAACP Image Award for Outstanding Supporting Actress in a Motion Picture for her portrayal of Nick's girlfriend Diane. She was also nominated for the BET Awards Best Actress.
