= Walter Romanowicz =

American soccer player

Personal information
- Date of birth: April 24, 1918
- Date of death: July 9, 1986 (aged 68)
- Place of death: Fall River, Massachusetts
- Position: Goalkeeper

Senior career*
Years	Team	Apps	(Gls)
- Ponta Delgada S.C.

International career
1947	United States	2	(0)
- * Club domestic league appearances and goals

Walter Romanowicz (April 24, 1918 – July 9, 1986) was an American soccer goalkeeper. He played for the Fall River, Massachusetts, Ponta Delgada S.C. which won the 1947 National Challenge Cup and National Amateur Cup. Based on these result, the U.S. Soccer Federation selected the club to act as the U.S. national team at the 1947 NAFC Championship. As a result, Romanowicz earned two caps with the U.S. national team. In the first game, the U.S. 5-0 to Mexico and in the second, they lost 5–2 to Cuba.

Romanowicz was inducted into the New England Soccer Hall of Fame in 1986. He died in Fall River, Massachusetts.
