= Lethbridge Dodgers =

- 1975–1983; Lethbridge, Alberta

Minor league affiliations
- Class: Rookie
- League: Pioneer League

Major league affiliations
- Team: Los Angeles Dodgers (1977–1983); Montreal Expos (1975–1976)

Minor league titles
- League titles (3): 1977; 1979; 1980

Team data
- Name: Lethbridge Dodgers (1977–1983); Lethbridge Expos (1975–1976)
- Ballpark: Henderson Stadium (1977–1983)

The Lethbridge Dodgers were a team in Minor League Baseball based in Lethbridge, Alberta, that competed from 1975 to 1983. After the 1983 season, the team relocated to Idaho and became the Pocatello Gems.

== History ==
The Dodgers arrived in Lethbridge when the Ogden Spikers moved to town, 65 years after the city had last hosted a professional baseball team. In their debut 1975 season the team went 35–37, third in the four-team Pioneer League, under manager Van Kelly. Steve Ratzer (3-4, 5 saves, 2.33 ERA) was third in the league in ERA and second in saves for a team that seemingly played in a high-offense environment (league-high 403 runs and 437 runs allowed). First baseman Ray Crowley was second in the league in average and hit .338/~.495/.543. He did not make the All-Star team, but two outfielders did – Andy Dyes (.324/~.393/.407, a league-high 58 RBI) and Andre Dawson (.330/~.389/.553, the league leader with 99 hits, 166 total bases and 13 homers and presumably the slugging leader as well).

In 1976 Walt Hriniak managed the team to a last-place (30-42) finish. They again led in runs (449) and allowed 434 (3rd), a positive run differential despite their bad record. Third baseman John Scoras (.370/~.449/.619) led the league in batting average, hits (101), total bases (169), homers (13) and RBI (63) and tied for the doubles lead (17) in winning a Triple Crown, the only one in the Pioneer League between 1961 and 1997. He was joined on the All-Star team by catcher Doug Simunic (.244/~.371/.413). David Palmer (0-5, 7.20) had a horrible year but went on to the best major-league career from the team.

In 1977, the Lethbridge Expos of the Pioneer League began an affiliation with the Los Angeles Dodgers and became known as the Lethbridge Dodgers. The team was an instant success, going 44–26 and capturing a championship for manager Gail Henley in its first season. Michael Zournas hit 21 home runs to lead the league, James Nobles paced the circuit with 9 wins, and catcher Jesse Baez and second baseman Don LeJohn were All-Stars. Jim Lefebvre took over as the club's skipper the next season, and the team fell to fifth place with a 33–35 record. Still, pitcher Roberto Alexander won 9 games to lead the league and third baseman German Rivera made the All-Star team.

Henley returned as the team's manager in 1979, and the Dodgers responded by going 38–30 and capturing another league title. Richard Rodas won the pitching Triple Crown with 12 wins, a 1.12 ERA, and 148 strikeouts, and was joined by first baseman Greg Brock on the All-Star team. Henley remained with the club in 1980, and they posted a league-best 52–18 record and repeated as champs. Pitcher Charles Jones struck out a league-high 115 batters, and first baseman Greg Smith, designated hitter Audie Cole, and pitcher Curtis Reade were All-Stars.

Gary LaRocque replaced Henley at the helm in 1981, and the Dodgers dropped to 43–27, missing out on the playoffs. A bright spot for the team was pitcher Sid Fernandez, who struck out 128 and posted a 1.54 ERA. LaRocque's club fell to 25–45 the next season, and not one player made the All-Star team. Henley returned for a third go-round as manager in 1983, and the Dodgers improved to 39–31, narrowly missing out on the postseason. Shortstop Jeff Hamilton and second baseman Ken Harvey were All-Stars, and pitcher Derek Lee tied for the league lead with 9 wins. However, after the season, the Dodgers relocated to Idaho and became the Pocatello Gems.

The Pocatello Gems began play in the Pioneer League in 1984, when the Lethbridge Dodgers relocated to Pocatello, Idaho, and were members of the circuit for just two seasons. As an independent club in 1984, led by manager Ron Mihal, they posted the league's worst record (23-47). The next season they became an Oakland Athletics affiliate and improved slightly to 24–45 under manager Dave Hudgens, who led them to a third-place finish out of four clubs in the Southern Division. One bright spot that year was the play of shortstop Walt Weiss, who made the league's 1985 All-Star team. However, after the season, the Gems franchise suspended operations.

== Notable alumni ==
=== Baseball Hall of Fame Alumni ===
- Andre Dawson (1975) Inducted, 2010

=== Notable alumni ===
- Rickey Hill (1975)
- David Palmer (1976)
- Ron Kittle (1977) MLB All-Star; 1983 AL Rookie of the Year
- Jim Lefebvre (1977) MLB All-Star; 1965 NL Rookie of the Year
- Mitch Webster (1977-1978)
- Candy Maldonado (1978)
- Mike Marshall (1978) MLB All-Star
- Greg Brock (1979)
- Sid Fernandez (1981) 2 x MLB All-Star
- Steve Sax (1981) 5 x MLB All-Star; 1981 NL Rookie of the Year
- Mariano Duncan (1982) MLB All-Star

== Year-by-year record ==
Year	Record	Finish	Manager	
1975	35–37	3rd	Van Kelly	
1976	30–42	4th	Walt Hriniak	
1977	44–26	1st	Gail Henley	League Champs
1978	33–35	5th	Jim Lefebvre	
1979	38–30	1st	Gail Henley	League Champs
1980	52–18	1st	Gail Henley	League Champs
1981	43–27	2nd	Gary LaRocque	
1982	25–45	3rd (tie)	Gary LaRocque	
1983	39–31	2nd	Gail Henley	
1984	23–47	4th	Ron Mihal	
1985	24–45	3rd	Dave Hudgens	

== Sources ==
This article is based on the "Lethbridge Expos" article at Baseball-Reference.com Bullpen. The Bullpen is a wiki, and its content is available under the GNU Free Documentation License.
