= Joseph Michaels =

American soccer player

Joseph Michaels (3 December 1915 – 5 December 2001) was an American soccer player. He made three appearances for United States men's national soccer team between 1937 and 1947.

Michaels first played for the national team in a 7–3 loss to Mexico on September 19, 1937. His second game was another blowout loss, 5–1, to Mexico six days later. Then, the U.S. did not play an international game for nearly ten years. In 1947, Michaels club team, Ponta Delgada S.C. won both the National Challenge Cup and National Amateur Cup. Based on these results, the U.S. Soccer Federation selected Ponta Delgada to represent the United States at the 1947 NAFC Championship. Consequently, Michaels played in the July 20, 1947, 5–2 loss to Cuba. This gave Michaels the U.S. record for the longest gap between national team games: nine years, nine months and twenty-four days.
