= Gary LaRocque =

American baseball player and coach

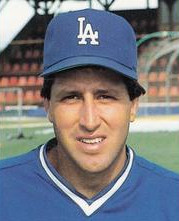
- LaRocque in 1988
- Minor League Manager
- Born: 1953 (age 72–73)
- Bats: Left Throws: Right
- Stats at Baseball Reference

Gary LaRocque is the former director of player development for the St. Louis Cardinals, a Major League Baseball (MLB) franchise. A graduate of the University of Hartford, he was an All-American shortstop. LaRocque began his professional baseball career when the Milwaukee Brewers selected him in the 14th round of the 1975 Major League Baseball draft as a shortstop. He played Minor League Baseball for three seasons, managed for eight and has also served as a coach, regional professional scout, and scouting director. In 308 total games played in the Brewers minor league system, LaRocque batted .247 with 24 doubles, two home runs, 97 runs batted in, 56 stolen bases, 172 bases on balls and 114 strikeouts over 1,280 plate appearances.

After the Brewers released him, LaRocque taught mathematics at East Windsor High School in East Windsor, Connecticut. From 1978 to 1980, he was the assistant coach for the Hartford Hawks men's basketball team.

He became a coach and then a field manager in the Los Angeles Dodgers' minor league system from 1981 to 1988. He guided the Lethbridge Dodgers (1981–1982), the Gulf Coast Dodgers (1983), the San Antonio Dodgers (1984–1987) and the Bakersfield Dodgers (1988). He was named the Pioneer Baseball League's Manager of the Year in 1981. In 883 total games managed – all in the Dodgers' system – LaRocque won 413 and lost 470 for a .468 winning percentage. In 1989, the Dodgers assigned him to scout the region including Virginia, North Carolina and South Carolina. Until 1998, LaRocque continued to work in various roles for the Dodgers. He then went to the New York Mets system as scouting director from 1998 to 2003 and became the Mets Director of Player Development and Assistant General Manager/Vice President in 2004. He signed David Wright out of Chesapeake, Virginia, in 2001. In early 2008, the Cardinals hired him as Senior Special Assistant to general manager John Mozeliak.

In 2010, LaRocque's responsibilities shifted from player scouting to player development. He then became the top advisor to John Vuch, who had shifted to the position of farm director. LaRocque and Vuch worked to strengthen the connection between the major league coaches and minor league staff, which including designing and writing "The Cardinal Way" handbook for baseball operations staff and minor league players. During LaRocque's involvement with player development, the Cardinals have drafted and groomed such prospects as Shelby Miller, Trevor Rosenthal, Lance Lynn, Joe Kelly, Kolten Wong and Oscar Taveras. He also worked personally with the staff at each of the Cardinals' minor league affiliates. Baseball America ranked the Cardinals' minor league system 12th in 2012. In 2013, Baseball America ranked the system first. LaRocque implemented an approach to creating methods of challenging minor league prospects in environments beyond their conventional skill placement. During the Cardinals' 2013 World Series run, they secured seventeen of 25 players on their postseason roster who made no more than $524,000, or slightly above major league minimum.

== Personal life ==
Gary has one son named Chris and one daughter named Ashley.
