= Gail Henley =

American baseball player (1928–2024)

- Outfielder
- Born: October 15, 1928; Wichita, Kansas, U.S.
- Died: November 25, 2024 (aged 96)
- Batted: Left Threw: Right

MLB debut
- April 13, 1954, for the Pittsburgh Pirates

Last MLB appearance
- May 6, 1954, for the Pittsburgh Pirates

MLB statistics
- Batting average: .300
- Home runs: 1
- Runs batted in: 2
- Stats at Baseball Reference

Teams
- Pittsburgh Pirates (1954)

Gail Curtice Henley (October 15, 1928 – November 25, 2024) was an American professional baseball player, scout and manager. Although his playing career lasted for 14 seasons (1948–1961), he appeared in only 14 games in Major League Baseball as a right fielder and pinch hitter, all during the opening weeks of 1954, for the Pittsburgh Pirates. He batted left-handed, threw right-handed, and stood 5 feet 9 inches (1.75 m) tall and weighed 180 pounds (82 kg). He died November 25, 2024, at the age of 96.

== Playing career ==
Born in Wichita, Kansas, Henley grew up in Los Angeles, where he graduated from Inglewood High School and attended the University of Southern California. As a sophomore, he starred for the 1948 national-champion USC Trojans baseball team, batting .400. He then signed a professional contract with the New York Giants.

Henley would never play for the Giants, however; after five years in their farm system, he was acquired by the Pirates via the Cincinnati Redlegs in October 1952 in a transaction that brought four-time National League All-Star Gus Bell to Cincinnati. Henley made the 1954 Pirates out of spring training and appeared in 14 of the Bucs' first 22 games. After going hitless in his first four major league at bats, Henley broke through on April 19 with a first-inning home run against his old team, the Giants, a key blow in a 7–5 Pirate victory. But Henley was hurt when he ran into a wall during a game against Brooklyn, then ran afoul of general manager Branch Rickey when he went dancing at a nightclub as he was recovering from the head injury. When the rosters were cut from 28 to 25 men in May, he was sent to Double-A New Orleans and never returned to the majors. His nine MLB hits also included a double, and he drove in two runs, both RBI coming from his April 19 homer.

== Minor league manager and scout ==
Henley remained in baseball for another 50 years as a player, manager and scout. He ran teams in the Detroit Tigers' minor league system from 1961–1966. Then he joined the Los Angeles Dodgers as a scout based in Southern California, in addition to handling Rookie-level Dodger farm clubs for six seasons during the 1970s and 1980s. He later scouted for the Kansas City Royals, San Diego Padres and Tampa Bay Devil Rays.

=== Teams managed ===
- Montgomery Rebels (1961)
- Thomasville Tigers (1962)
- Lakeland Tigers (1963)
- Duluth–Superior Dukes (1964)
- Jamestown Tigers (1965)
- Daytona Beach Islanders (1966)
- Ogden Dodgers (1972–1973)
- Lethbridge Dodgers (1977, 1979–1980, 1983)
