= The Hill (2023 film) =

Film directed by Jeff Celentano

- Theatrical release poster
- Directed by: Jeff Celentano
- Screenplay by: Angelo Pizzo; Scott Marshall Smith
- Based on: A treatment by Bill Chaffin; A screenplay by; Stephen Hintz; Aric Hornig
- Produced by: Jeff Celentano; Warren Ostergard
- Starring: Dennis Quaid; Colin Ford; Joelle Carter; Randy Houser; Jesse Berry; Bonnie Bedelia; Scott Glenn
- Cinematography: Kristopher Kimlin
- Edited by: Douglas Crise
- Music by: Geoff Zanelli
- Production companies: Vitamin A Films; Rescue Dog Productions; Piney Pictures
- Distributed by: Briarcliff Entertainment
- Release date: August 25, 2023
- Running time: 122 minutes
- Country: United States
- Language: English
- Box office: $7.6 million

The Hill is a 2023 American biographical sports drama film about baseball player Rickey Hill overcoming a physical handicap in order to try out for a legendary major league scout. It was directed by Jeff Celentano from a screenplay by Angelo Pizzo and Scott Marshall Smith. It stars Dennis Quaid, Colin Ford, Joelle Carter, Randy Houser, Jesse Berry, Bonnie Bedelia, and Scott Glenn.

The film was released in the United States in theaters by Briarcliff Entertainment on August 25, 2023.

== Plot ==
In a small Texan town, a young Rickey Hill wears leg braces due to a degenerative spinal disease, but enjoys playing baseball and is regarded as a batting prodigy. James, his strict father and a pastor, dissuades Rickey from the sport, wanting to shield him from further injuries and urging him to pursue preaching.

The family is evicted from their home and forced to move to Oklahoma. When their car breaks down, they are assisted by a family who offers James a position at a local church.

Rickey struggles to adapt to his new home, until he encounters a group of children playing baseball. The pitcher harasses him over his disability until he connects on a pitch. He tries to join the local baseball team but is required to have parental permission, so his brother Robert decides to forge their father's signature. When James finds out, he lectures both for lying but refrains from beating Robert at the last minute. Rickey finally reassures him that he is capable of both preaching and playing baseball.

A few years later, Rickey is one of the top high school baseball players, but struggles to attract the interest of Major League Baseball scouts. Ray, his boss at his part-time job who watched Rickey bat as a child, invites scout Red Murff to his upcoming game.

Rickey plays against the bully from his youth, off whom he hits the go-ahead home run, but trips on a sprinkler while catching the game-winning out. A doctor diagnoses him with a fractured ankle and severed leg tendons, declaring his playing days to be over.

Although an effort to fundraise to pay for his treatment fails to reach its goal, Ray provides him with the rest to help him recover in time for an MLB tryout. James forbids him from taking part and he despondently agrees, to the dismay of his childhood sweetheart Gracie.

Rickey's grandmother falls ill, and she urges James to let Rickey pursue baseball before dying. A motivated Rickey removes the cast from his foot and begins training with Robert.

On the first day of the tryout, Rickey runs drills alongside other prospects in front of scouts including Murff, during which underachieving players are sent off by scouts. He struggles with fielding and baserunning, so a scout tries to dismiss him until he convinces him to let him bat. Most of his hits land near Murff in the adjacent park.

The tryout concludes without a word and he dejectedly goes home before returning to retrieve his glove, where he sees a motivational message from James. Rickey returns to the park, where Murff challenges him to be the designated hitter for both teams in the prospects game.

During the game, Murff pressures each pitcher to strike out Rickey, though he hits off each of them with ease. Meanwhile, as he gives his sermon at church, James expresses regret for not properly supporting his son. After Rickey has hit on all ten of his at bats, Murff summons major leaguer Jimmy Hammer to pitch against him. Hammer then hits him in the rib on a pitch; Murff snidely tells him to take first base, but Rickey insists on staying and successfully connects on the ensuing pitch. After the game, Rickey and James reunite in the outfield, where the latter remarks he will "have to get used" to Rickey's newfound career.

In an epilogue, Rickey signs with the Montreal Expos in 1975 and plays four seasons in the minor leagues before his spine gives out.

== Cast ==
- Dennis Quaid as Pastor James Hill
- Colin Ford as Rickey Hill
- Joelle Carter as Hellen Hill, Rickey's mother
- Scott Glenn as Red Murff, the MLB scout who discovers Rickey
- Siena Bjornerud as Gracie Shanz, Rickey's girlfriend
- Ryan Dinning as Robert Hill
- Carina Worm as Connie Hill
- Bonnie Bedelia as Gram
- Randy Houser as Ray Clemons, a man from Rickey's childhood who encourages him to try out for MLB
- Jesse Berry as young Rickey Hill
- John Smoltz as a baseball color commentator

== Production ==
In August 2021, Deadline Hollywood reported that Dennis Quaid joined the cast of the sports drama film The Hill, with Jeff Celentano directing from a script by Angelo Pizzo and Scott Marshall Smith. It was produced by Celentano with Rescue Dog Productions and Warren Ostergard of Vitamin A Films. Quaid plays Pastor James Hill while Colin Ford plays his son Rickey Hill. Celentano said, "I'm setting out to make an iconic film in the classic sense, a beautiful sweeping and powerful inspirational story. One that will stand the test of time like The Blind Side, Rudy, Field of Dreams and The Natural. Dennis was the first and only person I thought of for the lead role upon reading the script." The Hill was Smith's final film before his death in December 2020.

Principal photography took place in Augusta, Georgia and the surrounding Columbia County region from November to December 2021. Other locations included the Lake Olmstead Stadium and Central Savannah River Area. The historic Wrightsboro Church in McDuffie County was used to depict a 1960s era church in rural Texas.

=== Music ===
Music and the score was composed by Geoff Zanelli. The end credits features Randy Houser's 2022 single "Rub A Little Dirt On It".

Track listing
No.	Title	Length
1.	"The Hill"	2:18
2.	"Young Rickey"	1:58
3.	"Zero Smoke Breaks"	2:29
4.	"That's Gonna Be You One Day"	1:56
5.	"False Idols"	0:59
6.	"You Do Not Deserve James Hill"	1:00
7.	"Goodbye"	1:31
8.	"The Heaven I know"	2:28
9.	"I Stay Down Here, I'm Dead"	1:41
10.	"Calm Your Mind"	2:38
11.	"Dreaming of the Majors"	1:53
12.	"Consequences"	2:41
13.	"Off He Goes"	1:02
14.	"Sure You Ain't Cheatin'?"	3:10
15.	"Don't Wanna Make You Suffer"	5:12
16.	"Operation Rickey Hill"	1:38
17.	"You Are Gonna Paralyze Him"	1:50
18.	"It'll Take Time"	2:16
19.	"Bring Down Goliath"	3:12
20.	"I'll Prevail"	2:16
21.	"Breakin' Windshields"	2:44
22.	"How Many Miracles Do You Need?"	2:24
23.	"Go Get 'Em"	1:44
24.	"It's Your Time"	2:26
25.	"Designated Hitter"	2:05
26.	"Get Up"	3:48
27.	"Father and Son"	3:45
Total length:		63:04

== Release ==
The Hill was released in theaters by Briarcliff Entertainment on August 25, 2023. It was originally set to be released earlier on August 18.

== Reception ==
=== Box office ===
In the United States and Canada, The Hill was released alongside Gran Turismo, Retribution, and Golda, and is projected to gross $2–3 million from 1,570 theaters in its opening weekend. The film made $800,000 on its first day, and grossed a total of $7.6 million.

=== Critical response ===
On the review aggregator website Rotten Tomatoes, 44% of 36 critics' reviews are positive, with an average rating of 5.6/10. The website's consensus reads: "Solid work from Dennis Quaid helps elevate The Hill, but this fact-based underdog drama is only intermittently inspirational." Metacritic, which uses a weighted average, assigned the film a score of 48 out of 100, based on four critics, indicating "mixed or average" reviews. Audiences polled by PostTrak gave the film an 80% positive score, with 58% saying they would definitely recommend it.

Frank Scheck of The Hollywood Reporter gave a mixed review, criticizing the slow pace and "extraneous subplots". He praised the writers, saying "Angelo Pizzo and the late Scott Marshall Smith inject plenty of warmth and humor into the tale, never letting the characters overly succumb to stereotypes" and "Fortunately, the film also includes enough light-hearted humor to compensate for its corniness".

G. Allen Johnson writing for the San Francisco Chronicle gave a negative review. He criticized the script as being a "cliched" Hollywood biopic, elaborating "The Hill is meant to be inspiring, of course, and to some, it might be, but the vibe is more reassuring in the way that it does not deviate from the standard-issue formula of such movies. It is a cinematic case of confirmation bias, designed to fulfill preexisting values and beliefs". He described Celentano's direction as "a Rockwellian postcard vision of midcentury small-town American South, where even the rusty cars and run-down houses have a golden nostalgic glow".

== See also ==
- List of baseball films
