= Camera Store =

2017 film by Scott Marshall Smith

- Directed by: Scott Marshall Smith
- Written by: Scott Marshall Smith
- Produced by: Robert Reed Peterson; Nicholas Cafritz; Scott Marshall Smith; Albert T. Dickerson III
- Starring: John Larroquette; John Rhys-Davies; Paul Ben-Victor; David James Elliott; Laura Silverman; Cheryl Ladd
- Cinematography: Yaron Levy
- Edited by: Ryan Dufrene
- Music by: Justin Caine Burnett
- Production company: Provocator
- Distributed by: Freestyle Digital Media
- Release date: January 6, 2017 (PSIFF)
- Running time: 99 minutes
- Country: United States
- Language: English
- Budget: $4.4 million

Camera Store is a 2017 American drama film written and directed by Scott Marshall Smith. The film stars John Larroquette, John Rhys-Davies, Paul Ben-Victor, David James Elliott, Laura Silverman and Cheryl Ladd. The film was released on June 19, 2017 by Provocator.

== Plot ==
Ray LaPine (John Larroquette) and Pinky Steuben (John Rhys-Davies) work at a tired old camera store named Bibideaux Photographic. The entire movie occurs on Christmas Eve 1994.

== Production ==
Production took place in Louisiana in early 2016, with a budget of $4.4 million.

== See also ==
- List of Christmas films
