= Angelo Pizzo =

American screenwriter and film producer

- Born: Chicago, Illinois, U.S.
- Education: • Indiana University Bloomington (BA, political science, 1971) • University of Southern California film school
- Occupations: screenwriter, producer, director
- Writing career
- Genres: Drama, fiction, sport

Angelo Pizzo (/ˈpiːtzoʊ/) is an American screenwriter and film producer, usually working on films based on a true story, and usually about athletics. He is best known for Hoosiers and Rudy.

== Biography ==
=== Early life and education ===
Pizzo grew up in Bloomington, Indiana, the grandson of a Sicilian immigrant. He graduated from University High School and Indiana University Bloomington, where he received a bachelor's degree in political science. While at IU, Pizzo joined the Sigma Nu fraternity, where he met future collaborator David Anspaugh.

Pizzo considered becoming a lawyer, but his father encouraged him to do something he loved. So he enrolled in the University of Southern California (USC) School of Cinematic Arts.

=== Career ===
Pizzo began his film/television career with Warner Brothers Television in the story development group and then moved to Time-Life Films. After serving as Vice President of Feature Film Productions there, he worked with former fraternity brother Anspaugh to create Hoosiers, about a small-town Indiana high school team winning the state basketball title. Hoosiers earned two Academy Award nominations. It was named best sports film of all time by USA Today and by ESPN's expert panel and website users. Hoosiers also is listed on the Library of Congress' National Film Registry.

Later films include Rudy, about a young man who dreams of playing football at the University of Notre Dame, and The Game of Their Lives, about the U.S. Soccer Team beating the English team against all odds.

Pizzo also was an associate producer on the made-for-TV movies Father Figure and Blinded by the Light.

Pizzo continues writing screenplays. He also has served on the boards of the Heartland Film Festival, Kinsey Institute, and New Harmony Writers' Project.

== Personal life ==
Pizzo lived in the Los Angeles area for about thirty years. He and his second wife, Greta Lind, settled in Ojai, California but moved back to Bloomington in 2004 to raise their sons: Anthony, born in 1994, and Quinn, born in 1997. They divorced in 2010. Pizzo met his life partner, Bobbi Bowden, in 2011.

Pizzo is an avid Indiana University basketball and football supporter and season ticket holder.

== Awards ==
On the night of the world premiere of Hoosiers in 1986, Pizzo was named a Sagamore of the Wabash. This is Indiana's highest civilian honor, given to those who have rendered distinguished service to the state or governor. He was awarded Indiana's Governor's Arts Award in 1995. In 2000 Pizzo was given an honorary doctorate from Franklin College. He received Indiana University's Thomas Hart Benton Mural Medallion for Distinguished Achievement in 1996 and the school's College of Arts and Sciences Distinguished Alumni Award in 2010. The Indiana Historical Society named Pizzo an Indiana Living Legend in 2011. In 2013 Pizzo was inducted into the Indiana Basketball Hall of Fame. He also received the Hall's Silver Medal Award, given in recognition of contributions to Indiana high school basketball by someone other than a high school player or coach. The following year he was inducted into the National Italian American Sports Hall of Fame. The Indiana Film Journalists Association gave Pizzo its Hoosier Award in 2015. In 2016 Pizzo was inducted into the Monroe County (Indiana) Sports Hall of Fame and also was given a TXMPA Impact Award from the Texas Motion Picture Alliance.

== Film credits ==
- Hoosiers (1986) — screenwriter, producer
- Rudy (1993) — screenwriter, co-producer
- The Game of Their Lives (2005) — screenwriter, co-producer
- My All American (2015) — screenwriter, director
- The Hill (2023) — screenwriter
