= 1947 National Challenge Cup =

Football cup championship in the United States

- Dewar Challenge Cup

Tournament details
- Country: United States
- Dates: 4 May – 7 Sep 1947

Final positions
- Champions: Ponta Delgada S.C. (1st title)
- Runners-up: Chicago Sparta
- Semifinalists: Brooklyn Hispano; Curry S.C.

The 1947 National Challenge Cup was the 33rd edition of the United States Soccer Football Association's annual open cup. Today, the tournament is known as the Lamar Hunt U.S. Open Cup. Teams from the American Soccer League II competed in the tournament, based on qualification methods in their base region.

Ponta Delgada S.C., the previous year's runners-up, won the tournament for their first time ever, defeating Chicago Sparta in two matches 6-1 and 3-2.
