= Michals =

- Pronunciation: /ˈmaɪkəlz/ MY-kəlz

Origin
- Origin: Michal, Michael
- Meaning: form of 'Who is like God'
- Region of origin: Hebrew

Other names
- Variant forms: Michaels, Michels

Michals is a patronymic surname meaning "son of Michael (or Michal)" . The prefix comes from Michael-, from Hebrew: מִיכָאֵל / מיכאל [miχaˈʔel], meaning "Who is like God?". There are other spellings. The given name Michal is common amongst Czechs.

== Persons with the surname ==
- Duane Michals (1932–2026), American photographer
- Mark Michals, American drummer for band Faster Pussycat
- William Michals (born 1965), American stage actor and baritone singer
