= Scott Marshall Smith =

American screenwriter (died 2020)

- Born: August 24, 1958; Monterey, California, U.S.
- Died: December 2, 2020 (aged 62)
- Education: New York University Tisch School of the Arts
- Occupation: Screenwriter

Scott Marshall Smith (August 24, 1958 – December 2, 2020) was an American screenwriter. He died at age 62 due to a stroke.

== Filmography ==
The following are Smith's various credits.

Year	Title	Director	Producer	Writer
2000	Men of Honor	No	No	Yes
2001	The Score	No	No	Yes
2014	When the Game Stands Tall	No	No	Yes
2017	Camera Store	Yes	Yes	Yes
2023	The Hill	No	No	Yes
