= Christmas Is Here Again =

- DVD Cover
- Directed by: Robert Zappia
- Written by: Robert Zappia; Marco Zappia
- Produced by: Robert Zappia; Jim Praytor
- Starring: Edward Asner; Kathy Bates; Madison Davenport; Colin Ford; Brad Garrett; Shirley Jones; Norm Macdonald; Daniel Roebuck; Andy Griffith
- Narrated by: Jay Leno
- Edited by: Michael D'Ambrosio
- Music by: John Van Tongeren
- Production companies: Easy To Dream Productions; Renegade Animation
- Distributed by: Screen Media Films
- Release date: October 20, 2007 (Heartland Film Festival)
- Running time: 74 minutes; 90 minutes (with commercials)
- Country: United States
- Language: English

Christmas Is Here Again is a 2007 American animated Christmas musical comedy film. The first feature film to be produced by Renegade Animation, it was co-written, co-produced and directed by Robert Zappia. Narrated by Jay Leno, the film features the voices of Edward Asner, Kathy Bates, Madison Davenport, Colin Ford, Brad Garrett, Andy Griffith, Shirley Jones, Norm Macdonald, and Daniel Roebuck, and marked Asner's fourth role in a Christmas-themed film after the 1977 film The Gathering, the 1999 film Olive, the Other Reindeer and the 2003 film Elf, though unlike the latter two films, he does not play Santa.

Christmas Is Here Again debuted at the Heartland Film Festival in Indianapolis on October 20, 2007.

== Synopsis ==
Sophiana, an orphan girl who carries a cane due to being crippled from a car accident that killed her parents, sets out to find Santa's toy sack (a magical source of toys made from the baby Jesus' swaddling clothes) that was stolen for thirty years by Krad ("dark" spelled backwards) as revenge against Santa for no longer handing out Krad's coal to naughty children. On her quest, she is helped by Paul Rocco, one of Santa's elves, Dart, a reindeer fawn, Buster, a cunning, greedy fox, and Charlee, a tall, big, dim-witted polar bear.

== Cast ==
- Madison Davenport as Sophiana, a disabled girl from an orphanage who's been bullied by Miss Dowdy and occasionally the other children. She was crippled due a car accident that took the lives of her biological parents, leading her to using a cane. She is later adopted by the Clauses.
- Daniel Roebuck as Paul Rocco/Jacque
- Colin Ford as Dart, Prancer's grandson
- Norm Macdonald as Buster
- Brad Garrett as Charlee
- Ed Asner as Krad, the film's main villain. A former coal supplier who used to work for Santa Claus, until Santa decided to stop punishing children who were on his naughty list, leading Krad into stealing Santa's magic toy sack.
- Michael Norris as the Selves
- Kathy Bates as Miss Dowdy, the harsh assertive owner of the orphanage where Sophiana and other children live at, she has a more sympathetic personality near the end of the film.
- Andy Griffith as Santa Claus, the husband of Victoria Claus/Mrs. Claus and later Sophiana's adoptive father
- Shirley Jones as Victoria Claus, Santa's wife and later Sophiana's adoptive mother
- Jay Leno as the Narrator
- Randy Crenshaw/Bob Joyce/Sally Stevens/Susie Stevens Logan/Gary Stockdale/Carmen Twillie/Lauren Wood as Chorus

== Production ==
Renegade Animation, an animation company located in Glendale, California and known for the TV series Hi Hi Puffy AmiYumi and The Mr. Men Show, teamed up with Easy to Dream Entertainment to create Christmas Is Here Again. A small crew spent nine months on the principal animation, which was completed in mid-2006.

One of the songs in the film's soundtrack (as well as the film's working title) was "Who Stole Santa's Sack?"

== Awards ==
In 2008, it received an Annie Award nomination for Best Voice Acting in an Animated Television Production (Madison Davenport as Sophiana). Additionally, in 2009, Christmas is Here Again was nominated for the Annie Award for Best Animated Home Entertainment Production. Colin Ford, the voice of Dart, was also nominated for a Young Artist Award in 2009 for Best Performance in a Voice-Over Role - Young Actor.

== Home video ==
The film released on DVD in the United States on November 4, 2008. The disc contains a behind-the-scenes featurette, cast interviews and "Name the Reindeer", as extras.

Originally Dart had a red nose akin to Rudolph's on the DVD cover. On the final version of the cover, his nose is black.

== Reception ==
Richard Propes of The Independent Critic website gave it an A and 3.5 stars, calling it "an ideal choice for families, children and for Scrooges like myself who, somewhere deep inside, still want to believe". However Common Sense Media gave the film a 2 out of 5 saying "Small children might like this holiday musical, but they may also lose patience at the 73-minute length".

== Stage version ==
The Pacific Conservatory Theatre presented the premiere of a stage adaptation of Christmas Is Here Again by Brad Carroll and Jeremy Mann in November and December 2014.

== See also ==
- List of animated feature-length films
- List of Christmas films
- Santa Claus in film
