= Geoffrey Douglas =

American journalist

- Born: 1944 (age 81–82); United States
- Occupations: Journalist, author

Geoffrey Douglas (born 1944) is an American author and journalist and former adjunct professor of writing at the University of Massachusetts/Lowell.

His most recent book, Love in a Dark Place (2025), set in 1980s Atlantic City, is his first work of fiction. Other books include The Grifter, The Poet, and The Runaway Train (2019), a collection of his stories in Yankee Magazine; The Game of Their Lives (1996, 2005), about the 1950 FIFA World Cup soccer match between the United States and England), which was adapted for a movie of the same name (2005) starring Gerard Butler and Wes Bentley; The Classmates: Privilege, Chaos and the End of an Era (2008); Dead Opposite: The Lives and Loss of Two American Boys (1994); and Class: The Wreckage of an American Family (1992), a memoir rooted in his own family experience.

Much of his magazine work has been anthologized. "The Double Life of Laura Shaw" is featured in Best American Sports Writing 2001, while his story in Yankee, "A Question of Life and Death," was a 2002 finalist for a National Magazine Award in reporting.

A former Bread Loaf fellow and writer-in-residence at several schools and colleges, he is married and lives in New Hampshire.

== Publications ==
- Douglas, Geoffrey. "The Grifter, The Poet, and The Runaway Train,* Globe Pequot, 2019. ((ISBN 9781493041480))
- Douglas, Geoffrey. "The Classmates: Privilege, Chaos, and the End of an Era." New York: Hyperion, 2008 ISBN 9781401301965
- Douglas, Geoffrey. The Game of Their Lives. New York: H. Holt and Co, 1996. ISBN 9780805038750. In 245 libraries according to WorldCat
- Douglas, Geoffrey. Dead Opposite: The Lives and Loss of Two American Boys. New York: H. Holt, 1995. ISBN 9780805026863.
- Douglas, Geoffrey. Class: The Wreckage of an American Family. New York: H. Holt, 1992. ISBN 9780805017373. In 345 libraries according to WorldCat
  - Review, Chicago Sun0Times
