= Manuel Martin (soccer) =

American soccer player and coach

Manuel Oliveira “Youngie” Martin (December 29, 1917, in Bristol, Rhode Island – September 5, 1997, in Fall River, Massachusetts) was an American soccer player. He earned seven caps with the U.S. national team between 1947 and 1949 and was a member of the U.S. soccer team at the 1948 Summer Olympics.

In 1947, the United States Soccer Federation selected the amateur Ponta Delgada S.C. team from Fall River, Massachusetts, to represent the U.S. at the 1947 NAFC Championship. At the time, Ponta Delgada was the reigning National Challenge Cup and National Amateur Cup champions. As a member of the National Cup champions Delgada, Martin traveled to Cuba for the NAFC Championship in July 1947. The U.S. lost both matches, 6–0 to Mexico and 5–2 to Cuba. In 1948, he again played in both U.S. games, also losses, this time to Norway and Ireland. He was the captain of the game with Norway. That year, he traveled to London for the 1948 Summer Olympics. However, the U.S. lost to Italy in the first round of the single elimination tournament. In 1949, he continued to be a stalwart for the U.S. as he started all five U.S. games that year. Four of the games came in the 1949 NAFC Championship. The U.S. took second place which guaranteed them a place in the 1950 FIFA World Cup. However, Martin was not selected for the World Cup roster.

After retiring from playing, Martin continued his involvement in the sport and began to coach, including time as the assistant coach of the University of Massachusetts Dartmouth women's soccer team.
