= Joe Ferreira =

American soccer player

Joseph Ferreira (December 15, 1916 – June 10, 2007) was a U.S. soccer player. He earned three caps with the U.S. national team between 1947 and 1948. He was born and died in Fall River, Massachusetts.

== Club career ==
Ferreira began his career with Ponta Delgada S.C., an amateur Fall River soccer club. At the time, Ponta Delgado S.C. was a dominant U.S. team, losing the National Challenge Cup final in 1946 and 1950 and winning the title in 1947. The team also won the 1947 National Amateur Cup.

In 1957, he signed with the expansion Fall River S.C. of the American Soccer League (ASL).

== National and Olympic teams ==
Following Ponta Delgado's 1947 National Cup championship, the U.S. Soccer Federation selected the club to play as the U.S. national team at the 1947 NAFC Championship. Ferreira earned his first of three caps with the U.S. national team at the NAFC championship in the 5–0 loss to Mexico. In 1948, he earned two more caps, the first an 11–0 loss to Norway on August 6, 1948. His last game came in a 3–1 victory over Israel on September 26, 1948.

Ferreria was also a member of the U.S. soccer team at the 1948 Summer Olympics 1948 Olympics. The U.S. lost 9–0 to Italy in the first round.
