= Colin Ford =

American actor (born 1996)

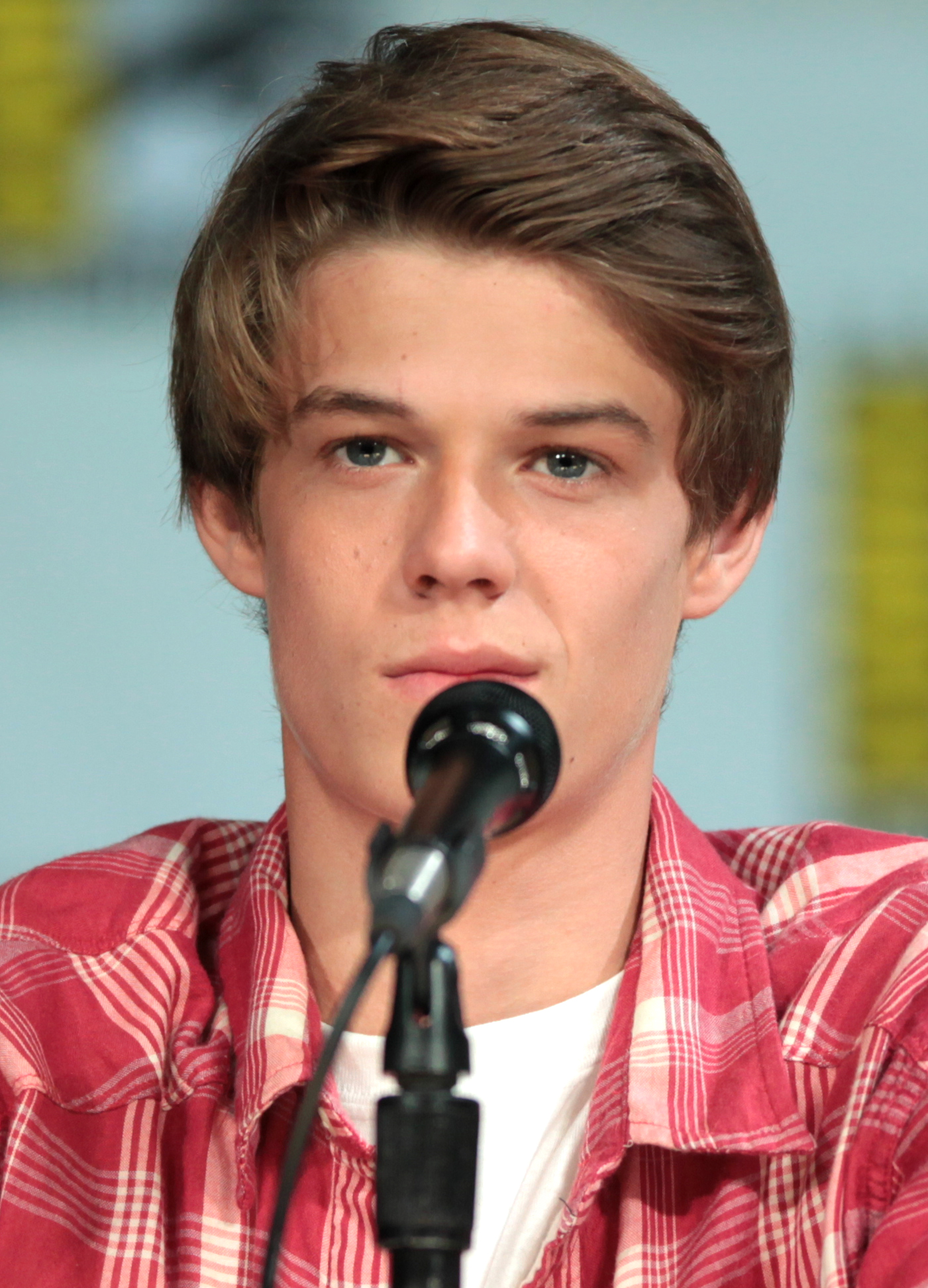
- Ford in 2014
- Born: Colin Lee Ford; September 12, 1996 (age 30); Nashville, Tennessee, U.S.
- Occupation: Actor
- Years active: 2001–present
- Notable work: Under The Dome; Daybreak

Colin Lee Ford (born September 12, 1996) is an American actor. He is known for his roles as Josh Wheeler in Daybreak; Joe McAlister in Under the Dome; the voice of Jake on Jake and the Never Land Pirates; Mikey on Can You Teach My Alligator Manners?, which earned him a Young Artist Award; young Sam Winchester in Supernatural; and Dylan Mee in the family film We Bought a Zoo.

== Early life and education ==
Ford was born in Nashville, Tennessee. He attended Campbell Hall School. He later attended Oaks Christian School, a college preparatory school in Westlake Village, California.

== Career ==
Ford enjoyed being in front of the camera, which led to his start in the entertainment business. At age four, he modeled for print ads for regional and national retailers. At age five, he made his film debut as Clinton Jr. in the feature film Sweet Home Alabama. He obtained more roles in independent films such as Moved, The Book of Jaene and Dumb and Dumberer: When Harry Met Lloyd.

In 2004, Ford portrayed Matthew Steed in the film The Work and the Glory. In 2005, he had a guest role in Smallville. Following Smallville, he reprised his role as Matthew Steed in The Work and the Glory: American Zion, then played a lead role as Jackson Patch in Dog Days of Summer. Ford played Zeph in the epic adventure In the Name of the King: A Dungeon Siege Tale, which was released in April 2007. Ford voiced the role of Dart, the reindeer, in the feature film Christmas Is Here Again, also in 2007.

Ford starred in the film We Bought a Zoo, which was released in December 2011, as Dylan. After filming We Bought a Zoo, Ford was cast in the TV series Under the Dome as Joe McAlister.

In 2018, it was announced that Ford had been cast in the main role of Josh Wheeler in the Netflix comedy drama series Daybreak. The series premiered on October 24, 2019, and was canceled after one season.

In 2020, Ford took on a supporting role in the family comedy film The War with Grandpa directed by Tim Hill, where he played the role of Russell. From 2022 to 2023, he appeared on the third season of the CW's action crime drama series Walker, portraying Corporal Cordell Walker.

In 2023, Ford starred in the romantic drama miniseries A Thousand Tomorrows, in which he played the lead role of Cody Gunnar. On the same year, he co-starred as Rickey Hill in the biographical sports drama film The Hill, which was released on August 25, 2023, by Briarcliff Entertainment.

In 2024, Ford appeared in the romantic comedy film Wallbanger, directed by Tosca Musk.

== Filmography ==
=== Film ===
Year	Title	Role	Notes
2002	Sweet Home Alabama	Clinton Jr.	Uncredited
2003	Dumb and Dumberer: When Harry Met Lloyd	Young Lloyd Christmas	Uncredited
2004	The Work and the Glory	Matthew Steed	
2005	The Work and the Glory: American Zion	Matthew Steed	
2006	The Ant Bully	Red teammate #4 (voice)	
2007	Christmas Is Here Again	Dart (voice)	Direct-to-video
2007	In the Name of the King	Zeph	
2007	American Family	Caleb Bogner	
2008	Dog Days of Summer	Jackson Patch	
2008	Lake City	Clayton	
2009	Push	Young Nick Gant	
2009	Bride Wars	Additional voices	
2009	Jack and the Beanstalk	Jack	
2011	Ticket Out	DJ	
2011	All Kids Count	Jim	
2011	In My Pocket	Young Stephen	
2011	We Bought a Zoo	Dylan Mee	
2012	Disconnect	Jason Dixon	
2012	Eye of the Hurricane	Mike Ballard	
2018	Every Day	Xavier Adams	
2018	Family Blood	Kyle	
2019	Extracurricular Activities	Reagan Collins	
2019	Captain Marvel	Steve Danvers	
2020	The War with Grandpa	Russell	
2022	Murmur	Maze	
2023	The Hill	Rickey Hill	
2024	Wallbanger	Ryan	

=== Television ===
Year	Title	Role	Notes
2005	Smallville	Young Evan Gallagher	Episode: "Ageless"
2006	The Tonight Show with Jay Leno	Dick Cheney action figure	Episode: "14.47"
2006	The Chelsea Handler Show	Blind Date	Episode: "1.3"
2006	Close To Home	Hal Brooks	Episode: "Legacy"
2007	Side Order of Life	Baby Puree (voice)	Episode: "Whose Sperm Is It Anyway?"
2007	Journeyman	Young Aeden Bennett	Episode: "Blowback"
2007; 2009–2011; 2016	Supernatural	Young Sam Winchester	Recurring role
2008–2009	Can You Teach My Alligator Manners?	Mikey (voice)	Main role
2009	Special Agent Oso	Joe, David (voice)	2 episodes
2010	Private Practice	Seth	Episode: "Love Bites"
2010–2013; 2017	Family Guy	Various voices	11 episodes
2010	CSI: Miami	Cody Williams	Episode: "Mommie Deadest"
2010	Hawaii Five-0	Evan Lowry	Episode: "Ohana"
2011–2013	Jake and the Never Land Pirates	Jake (voice)	Main role (season 1 to mid–season 2)
2012	Revolution	Michael	Episode: "The Children's Crusade"
2012–2013	The Mob Doctor	Sam Cooper	2 episodes
2013–2014	Sofia the First	Prince Hugo, Axel (voice)	2 episodes
2013–2015	Under the Dome	Joe McAlister	Main role
2017	American Dad!	Derek, Student (voice)	2 episodes
2019	Daybreak	Josh Wheeler	Main role
2019	All Rise	Billy Webb	Episode: "Fool For Liv"
2022	Dahmer – Monster: The Jeffrey Dahmer Story	Chazz	Episode: "Doin' a Dahmer"
2022	The Rookie	Austin Geoffrey	Episode: "Coding"
2022–2023	Walker	Young Cordell Walker	Recurring role
2023	A Thousand Tomorrows	Cody Gunnar	Main role
2024	9-1-1	Caleb Sandstrom / Flash Rob	Episode: "Hotshots"

== Awards and nominations ==
Year	Award	Category	Work	Result
2008	Young Artist Award	Best Performance in a TV Series – Guest Starring Young Actor	Journeyman	Nominated
2009	Young Artist Award	Best Performance in a Feature Film – Supporting Young Actor	Lake City	Nominated
2009	Young Artist Award	Best Performance in a Voice-Over Role – Young Actor	Christmas Is Here Again	Nominated
2010	Young Artist Award	Best Performance in a TV Series – Recurring Young Actor 13 and Under	Supernatural	Won
2011	Young Artist Award	Best Performance in a DVD Film – Young Actor	Jack and the Beanstalk	Won
2011	Young Artist Award	Best Performance in a TV Series – Guest Starring Young Actor 11–13	CSI: Miami	Nominated
2012	Young Artist Award	Best Performance in a Feature Film – Supporting Young Actor	We Bought a Zoo	Nominated
2012	Young Artist Award	Best Performance in a Voice-Over Role – Young Actor	Jake and the Never Land Pirates	Won
2014	Saturn Award	Best Performance by a Younger Actor in a Television Series	Under the Dome	Nominated
