= Joseph Rego-Costa =

American soccer player

Joseph Rego-Costa (July 3, 1919, in Fall River, Massachusetts – April 27, 2002, in Fall River, Massachusetts) was a U.S. soccer right halfback who earned four caps with the United States and was the captain of the team at the 1948 Summer Olympics.

== Club career ==
He played for the Ponta Delgada S.C. which won the 1947 National Challenge Cup and National Amateur Cup.

== National and Olympic teams ==
Based on the 1947 Cup results, the U.S. Soccer Federation selected Ponta Delgada to serve as the United States at the 1947 NAFC Championship. In the first game, the U.S. 5-0 to Mexico and in the second, they lost 5–2 to Cuba. The next year, he was selected as the captain of the U.S. soccer team at the 1948 Summer Olympics. The U.S. lost 9–0 to Italy in the first round. Rego-Costa played two more full internationals with the U.S. team following the Olympics, an 11–0 loss to Norway and a 5–0 loss to Ireland

He was inducted into the New England Soccer Hall of Fame in 1988.
