= Red Murff =

American baseball player (1921–2008)

- Topps baseball card, 1957 series, #321.
- Relief pitcher
- Born: April 1, 1921; Burlington, Texas, U.S.
- Died: November 28, 2008 (aged 87); Tyler, Texas, U.S.
- Batted: Right Threw: Right

MLB debut
- April 21, 1956, for the Milwaukee Braves

Last MLB appearance
- May 30, 1957, for the Milwaukee Braves

MLB statistics
- Win–loss record: 2–2
- Earned run average: 4.65
- Saves: 2
- Stats at Baseball Reference

Teams
- Milwaukee Braves (1956–1957)

John Robert Murff (April 1, 1921 – November 28, 2008) was an American relief pitcher in Major League Baseball who played from 1956 through 1957 for the Milwaukee Braves. Listed at 6 ft 3 in (1.91 m), 195 lb., Murff batted and threw right-handed. He attended Gettysburg College.

A native of Burlington, Texas, Murff started his professional baseball career in A and AA ball. On June 8, 1951, while pitching for the Texas City Texans, he threw a no-hitter against the Harlingen Capitals. A year later, he pitched 19 2/3 innings of a 20-inning game, in a lost cause against the Texarkana Bears, who defeated the Texans, 3–2. Then, in 1955, he won The Sporting News Minor League Player of the Year Award and was named Texas League Pitcher of the Year after going 27–11 for the Dallas Eagles.

Murff entered the majors in 1956 with the Braves as a 35-year-old rookie, having been signed by Milwaukee scout Earle W. Halstead. In a story chronicled in Murff's biography "The Scout", Halstead negotiated with Dick Burnett, owner of the Dallas Eagles in the Texas League, where Murff played. The two sides reached an impasse until Halstead proposed a game of gin rummy with the winner setting the terms of the trade. Halstead won and the Braves paid Burnett $40,000 and three players from the 40 man roster to obtain Murff's contract. In part of two seasons, he posted a 2–2 record with a 4.65 ERA and three saves in 26 appearances, including two starts, giving up 26 earned runs on 56 hits and 18 walks while striking out 31 in 50 1/3 innings of work.

Following his majors career, Murff coached in the minors and managed the 1960 Jacksonville Braves of the South Atlantic League. As a scout for the New York Mets, he discovered and signed future Hall of Famer pitcher Nolan Ryan and All-Star catcher Jerry Grote. Ryan, later named president of the Texas Rangers, noted his friendship with Murff in his 1999 Hall of Fame induction speech.

In the early 1970s, Murff helped start the University of Mary Hardin-Baylor baseball program, and retired to Tyler, Texas, in 1991 after serving 34 years as a scout. He was inducted into the Texas Baseball Hall of Fame in 1989 and the Texas Scouts Association Hall of Fame in 1999, and in 1994 the UMHB's ballpark was named in his honour, Red Murff Field.

Murff died in a Tyler nursing home at the age of 87.

In the 2023 film The Hill, Murff is portrayed by actor Scott Glenn.
