= 1946 National Challenge Cup =

Football cup championship in the United States

- Dewar Challenge Cup

Tournament details
- Country: United States
- Dates: 6 January – 14 July 1946

Final positions
- Champions: Chicago Viking F.C.
- Runners-up: Ponta Delgada S.C.
- Semifinalists: Heidelberg S.C.; Philadelphia Americans

The 1946 National Challenge Cup was the 33rd edition of the United States Football Association's annual open cup. Chicago Viking F.C. defeated Ponta Delgada S.C. in the two-game final, drawing 1-1 and winning 2–1.
