= Max Prieto =

Mexican footballer (1919-1998)

Personal information
- Full name: Maximiano Prieto Sánchez
- Date of birth: 28 March 1919
- Place of birth: Guadalajara, Mexico
- Date of death: 30 May 1998 (aged 79)
- Position: Forward

Senior career*
Years	Team	Apps	(Gls)
	Guadalajara	?	(72)

International career
1947–1950	Mexico	2	(0)
- * Club domestic league appearances and goals

Maximiano Prieto Sánchez (28 March 1919 – 30 May 1998) was a Mexican professional footballer who played as a forward for Mexico at the 1950 FIFA World Cup. He also played for Guadalajara.
