= Michels =

Michels is a surname, derived from Michaels, which in turn is derived from the given name Michael. Notable people with the surname include:

- Birgit Michels (born 1984), German badminton player
- David Michels, British businessman
- Jan Michels, Dutch footballer
- Jeff Michels, American weight lifter
- Mareno Michels, Dutch darts player
- Pete Michels, American television director
- Rinus Michels, Dutch association football player and coach
- Robert Michels, German sociologist
- Robert Michels (physician), physician and professor of Medicine and of Psychiatry
- Tim Michels, American businessperson

== See also ==
- Michels syndrome, a congenital disorder
