= Rafael Orozco (footballer) =

Mexican footballer (1922-2015)

Personal information
- Full name: Rafael Orozco Torres
- Date of birth: 8 May 1922
- Place of birth: Arandas, Jalisco, Mexico
- Date of death: 19 February 2015 (aged 92)
- Place of death: Guadalajara, Jalisco, Mexico
- Height: 1.72 m (5 ft 8 in)
- Position: Defender

Senior career*
Years	Team	Apps	(Gls)
1943–1952	C.D. Guadalajara		
- * Club domestic league appearances and goals

Rafael "Rafles" Orozco Torres (8 May 1922 – 19 February 2015) was a Mexican footballer, who played as defender for C.D. Guadalajara from 1943 to 1952.
