= Ángel Segura =

Uruguayan windsurfer

Personal information
- Born: 4 August 1982 (age 42); Montevideo, Uruguay

Sport
- Sport: Windsurfing

Ángel Segura (born 4 August 1982) is a Uruguayan windsurfer. He competed in the men's Mistral One Design event at the 2004 Summer Olympics.
