= Rodrigo Ruiz (footballer, born 1923) =

Mexican footballer

Personal information
- Full name: Rodrigo Ruiz Zárate
- Date of birth: 14 April 1923
- Place of birth: Mexico
- Date of death: 5 May 1999 (aged 76)
- Position: Defender

Senior career*
Years	Team	Apps	(Gls)
- C.D. Guadalajara

International career
1947–1950	Mexico	5	(1)
- * Club domestic league appearances and goals

Rodrigo Ruiz Zárate (14 April 1923 – 5 May 1999) was a Mexican football defender who played for Mexico in the 1950 FIFA World Cup. He also played for C.D. Guadalajara.
