= Walter G. Roman =

American engineer and inventor

Walter Guy Roman (October 31, 1905 – May 31, 1992) was born in Aspen, Colorado, and died in Gaithersburg, Maryland. Walter was a son of Erick Roman (born in Finland about 1862) and Selma Coles (born in Finland about 1870).

Roman graduated from the University of Colorado at Boulder in 1928 with a B.S. degree in Electrical Engineering. He married in 1934 and had two daughters.

- 1928–29 - Roman worked for Westinghouse Electric Corporation as a tester.
- 1929–31 - Roman was an electrical engineer at Westinghouse in East Pittsburgh, Pennsylvania.
- 1931–34 - Roman was in charge of the high voltage lab at Westinghouse.
- 1934–40 - Roman did impulse design engineering at Westinghouse.
- 1940–41 - Roman was manager of switch and fuse design at Westinghouse.
- 1942–45 - Roman was manager of calutron uranium isotope separator design for the Manhattan Project under a contract with Westinghouse Electric..
- 1945–51 - Roman left Westinghouse and worked for the Mototrol Engineering division in Buffalo, New York.
- 1951–59 - Roman returned to Westinghouse and was an advisory engineer at Westinghouse's Bettis Atomic Power Laboratory in suburban Pittsburgh.
- 1959–70 - Roman was manager of nuclear reactor engineering for the Nerva Project at the nearby Westinghouse Astronuclear Laboratory.

After September 1942 when General Leslie Groves was appointed as the military director of the Manhattan Project, Groves funded design and construction of a gigantic array of calutrons for separation of uranium isotopes. The US Army Corps of Engineers contracted with several manufacturing companies including Westinghouse Electric then in East Pittsburgh, PA. Westinghouse assigned Walter Roman to be Manager of separator design.

Roman, along with the people in his design department and drafting unit (headed by Robert Hile Best) were relocated to Berkeley, California near the Radiation Lab at the University of California, Berkeley where Walter Roman worked with physicists Ernest Lawrence, Robert Lyster Thornton, and Westinghouse physicist Edward Condon.

After preliminary calutron designs were tested at Berkeley using Lawrence's cyclotron, Westinghouse began manufacturing calutrons for installation at Oak Ridge, Tennessee, where the Y-12 plant containing hundreds of calutrons was being constructed. In 1943, Walter Roman's design department was relocated to the Oak Ridge plant because numerous redesigns of calutron parts were necessary.

In 1963 Walter Roman received a Special Patent Award from Westinghouse.

Roman was a member of the American Nuclear Society, a member of the IEEE (Institute of Electrical and Electronics Engineers), and a member of the American Institute for Aeronautics and Astronautics.

Roman designed nuclear engine rockets for space capsules, control rods for nuclear reactors, electronic control circuits, and nuclear reactors.
