= Alfonso Montemayor =

Mexican footballer (1922-2012)

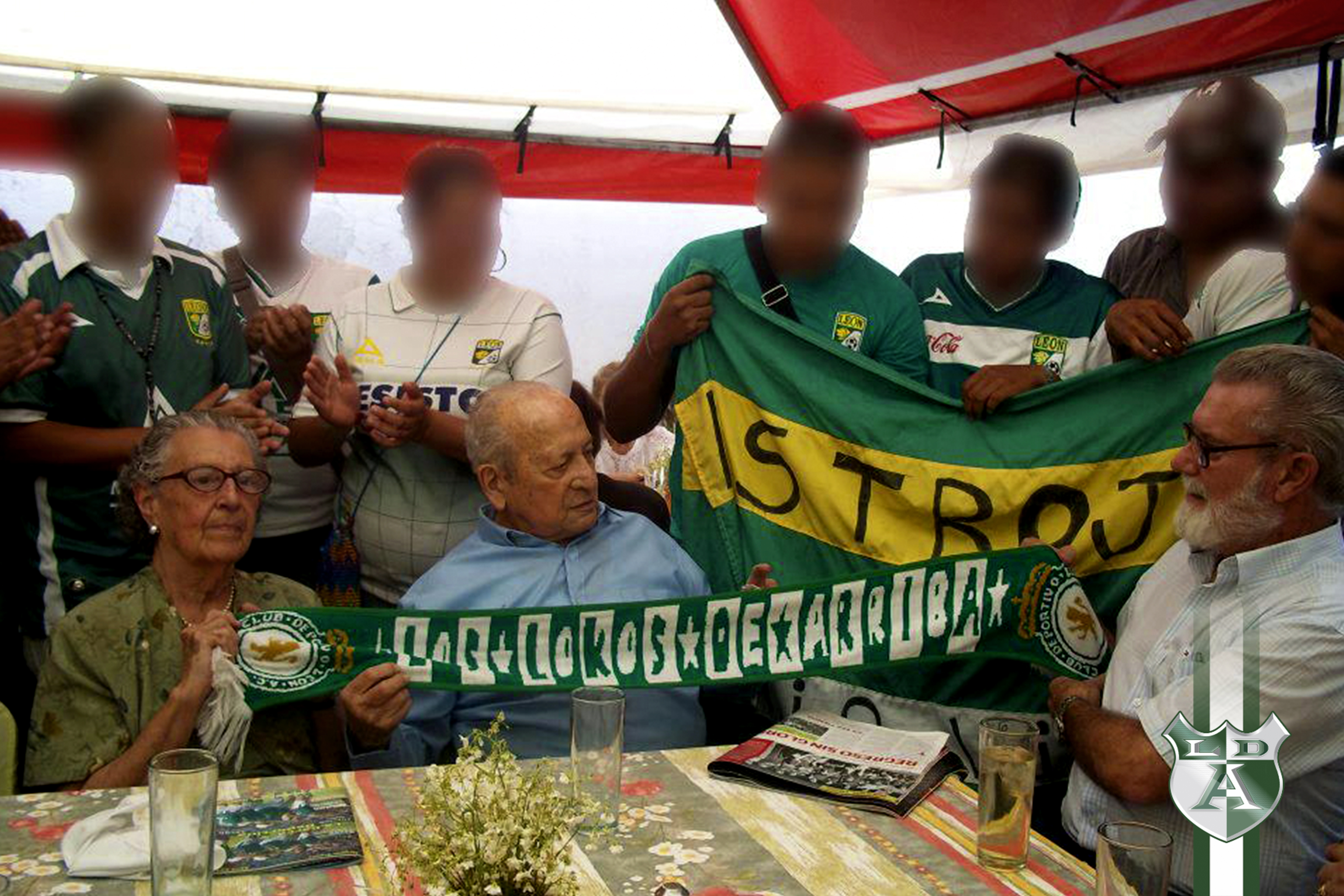

Personal information
- Full name: Alfonso Montemayor Crespo
- Date of birth: 28 April 1922
- Place of birth: Tampico, Mexico
- Date of death: 22 November 2012 (aged 90)
- Place of death: León, Guanajuato, Mexico
- Position: Defender

Senior career*
Years	Team	Apps	(Gls)
- Club León

International career
1947–1952	Mexico	8	(0)
- * Club domestic league appearances and goals

Alfonso Montemayor Crespo (28 April 1922 – 23 November 2012) was a Mexican football defender who played for Mexico in the 1950 FIFA World Cup. He also played for Club León.
