= John Souza =

American soccer player

Personal information
- Full name: John Souza-Benavides
- Date of birth: July 12, 1920
- Place of birth: Fall River, Massachusetts, U.S.
- Date of death: March 11, 2012 (aged 91)
- Place of death: Dover, Pennsylvania, U.S.
- Position: Forward

Senior career*
Years	Team	Apps	(Gls)
1946–1951	Fall River Ponta Delgada		
1951–19??	New York German-Hungaria		

International career
1947–1954	United States	14	(2)
- * Club domestic league appearances and goals

John Souza-Benavides (July 12, 1920 – March 11, 2012) known as John "Clarkie" Souza, was an American soccer player who earned 14 caps and scored 2 goals for the United States men's national soccer team, and played in the U.S. team's historic 1–0 victory over England in the 1950 FIFA World Cup. He was selected for a World Cup All-Star team by the Brazilian sports newspaper Mundo Esportivo, and remained the only American player ever selected to a World Cup All-Star team until Claudio Reyna in 2002. He is a member of the National Soccer Hall of Fame. He was born in Fall River, Massachusetts and died in Dover, Pennsylvania.

Souza is sometimes credited as having scored two goals in the tournament but modern sources indicate he scored neither; Gino Pariani scored against Spain and Frank Wallace scored their first goal against Chile.

Souza was a member of the Fall River Ponta Delgada team that won the National Challenge Cup in 1947, as well as the National Amateur Cup for three consecutive years, from 1946 to 1948. In 1951, he transferred to the New York German-Hungarians and proceeded to again win both the National Challenge Cup and the National Amateur Cup that year. Souza was a member of the U.S. team for both the 1948 and 1952 Summer Olympics, and played for the U.S. against Scotland at Hampden Park in 1952.

He was a World War II veteran, having served in the Navy as a Morse code operator on a supply ship in the South Pacific. He is buried with his wife Anita at Massachusetts National Cemetery, Bourne, Massachusetts.

He was not related to his teammate Ed Souza.
