= Ed Valentine =

American soccer player

Ed Valentine (November 23, 1914 – February 29, 2000) was a former U.S. soccer player who played with the amateur Fall River, Massachusetts-based club Ponta Delgada S.C. in the mid to late 1940s. Ponta Delgado was runner up in the 1946 National Challenge Cup. The next year, the team won the National Challenge Cup and the National Amateur Cup. This led to the United States Soccer Federation selecting Ponta Delgado to represent the U.S. in the 1947 NAFC Championship.

In 1947, the then recently founded North American Football Confederation held its first regional championship, known as the NAFC Championship. On July 13, 1947, Valentine earned his first cap with the U.S. national team in a 5–0 loss to Mexico. Seven days later, he earned his second cap, and scored his lone goal, with the national team in a 4–2 loss to Cuba.
