= Ed Souza =

American soccer player

Personal information
- Full name: Edward Souza-Neto
- Date of birth: September 22, 1921
- Place of birth: Fall River, Massachusetts, U.S.
- Date of death: May 19, 1979 (aged 57)
- Place of death: Warren, Rhode Island, U.S.
- Position: Forward

Senior career*
Years	Team	Apps	(Gls)
1947–1951	Fall River Ponta Delgada		
1951–19??	New York German-Hungaria		

International career
1947–1954	United States	7	(3)
- * Club domestic league appearances and goals

Edward Souza-Neto (September 22, 1921 – May 19, 1979) was an American soccer player who earned at least 7 caps and scored 3 goals for the United States men's national soccer team, and played in the U.S. team's historic 1–0 victory over England in the 1950 FIFA World Cup. Souza was also a member of the U.S. team for the 1948 Summer Olympics. He played his club soccer with Fall River Ponta Delgada and New York German-Hungarian SC.

In 1976, he was inducted into the National Soccer Hall of Fame.

Souza was not related to his teammate John Souza.
