= 1947 NAFC Championship =

Tournament details
- Host country: Cuba
- Dates: 13–20 July
- Teams: 3
- Venue(s): Estadio La Tropical, Havana

Final positions
- Champions: Mexico (1st title)
- Runners-up: Cuba
- Third place: United States

Tournament statistics
- Matches played: 3
- Goals scored: 16 (5.33 per match)
- Attendance: 39,400 (13,133 per match)
- Top scorer: (Mexico) Adalberto López (4 goals)

The 1947 NAFC Championship was the inaugural international association football championship for members of the North American Football Confederation (NAFC). Hosted by Cuba, the competition ran from 13–20 July 1947 and was contested by the national teams of Cuba and Mexico as well as the United States who were represented by an amateur team, Ponta Delgada.

After the three teams had all played each other, Mexico were declared champions on 22 July when the competition was curtailed. Originally scheduled as a double round-robin, the NAFC decided to finish the championships early after a single round-robin was completed.

== Background ==
The North American Football Confederation (NAFC) was founded in 1946. Along with the Confederación Centroamericana y del Caribe de Fútbol (CCCF), it was a precursor organisation to the Confederation of North, Central America and Caribbean Association Football (CONCACAF). Within a year of its founding, the NAFC organised a contest for its member associations.

Both Cuba and Mexico sent their national teams to the tournament. However, rather than forming a team for the competition, the United States Football Soccer Federation chose to send Ponta Delgada, an amateur team from Fall River, Massachusetts. Ponta Delgada were one of the best teams in the United States as they had won both the 1947 National Challenge Cup and 1947 National Amateur Cup.

== Format ==
The tournament was originally scheduled as a double round-robin where each team would play all of the others twice. The winner would be decided by the total number of points obtained across all matches played.

However, the tournament would only be played as a single round-robin after the NAFC decided to curtail the championship following the completion of half the scheduled matches.

=== Participants ===
- Cuba (Hosts)
- Mexico
- United States (Note: Represented by Ponta Delgada S.C.)

== Venue ==
All matches were held at La Tropical Stadium in Havana.

Havana
Estadio La Tropical
Capacity: 30,000
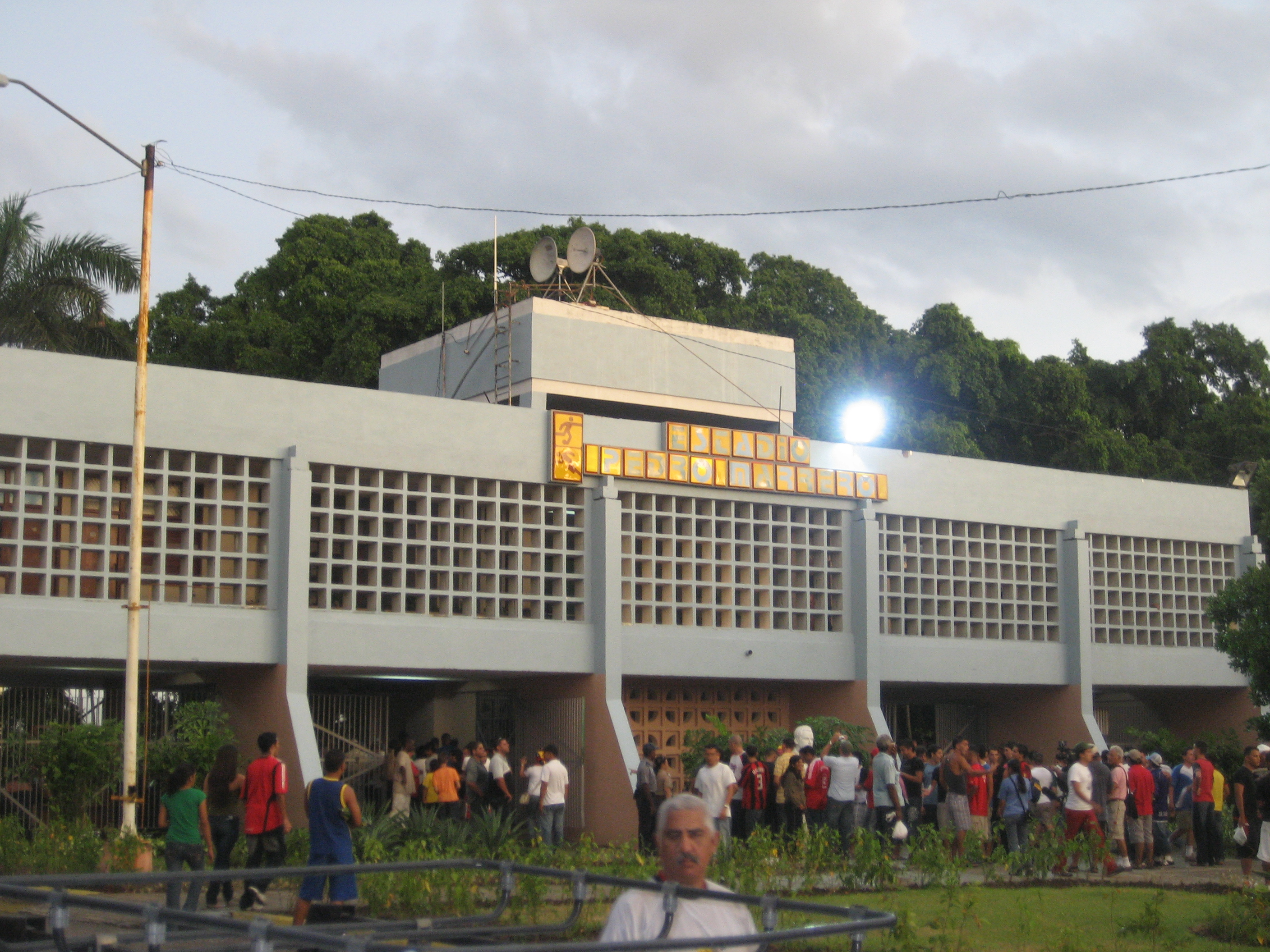

== Summary ==
The competition began on 13 July 1947 when Mexico faced the United States. A hat-trick from Adalberto López helped Mexico to a 5–0 win in the opening match. Four days later, Mexico recorded their second win of the competition as they defeated hosts Cuba 3–1. On 20 July, Cuba recorded their first win of the competition as a brace from Antonio Villalón helped them to a 5–2 win over the United States.

On 22 July, the NAFC decided to curtail the tournament and awarded the inaugural title to Mexico.

== Table ==
Pos	Team	Pld	W	D	L	GF	GA	GD	Pts
1	Mexico (C)	2	2	0	0	8	1	+7	4
2	Cuba	2	1	0	1	6	5	+1	2
3	United States	2	0	0	2	2	10	−8	0

(C) Champions

== Results ==
13 July 1947

Mexico	5–0	United States
López 3', 35', 85'; Segura 53'; Ruíz 78' (pen.)

Estadio La Tropical
Attendance: 5,400
Referee: José Tapia (Cuba)

17 July 1947

Cuba	1–3	Mexico
José Minsal 42'		Septién 30'; Segura 53'; López 83'

Estadio La Tropical
Attendance: 30,000
Referee: Sam Gabin (USA)

20 July 1947

Cuba	5–2	United States
Antonio Villalón 22', 28'; Luis Gironella 61'; Antonio Mederos 68'; Santiago Veiga 70'		Souza 50'; Valentine 55'

Estadio La Tropical
Attendance: 4,000
Referee: Carlos Esteva Tejada (Mexico)

July 1947

Mexico	Cancelled	United States

Estadio La Tropical

July 1947

Cuba	Cancelled	Mexico

Estadio La Tropical

July 1947

Cuba	Cancelled	United States

Estadio La Tropical

== Goalscorers ==
There were 16 goals scored in 3 matches, for an average of 5.33 goals per match.

4 goals

- (Mexico) Adalberto López

2 goals

- (Mexico) Angel Segura
- (Cuba) Antonio Villalón

1 goal

- (Mexico) Carlos Septién
- (Mexico) Rodrigo Ruíz
- (United States) Ed Souza
- (United States) Ed Valentine
