= Ponta Delgada S.C. =

Ponta Delgada
- Full name: Ponta Delgada Soccer Club
- Ground: Mark's Stadium, North Tiverton, RI
- League: National Soccer League (New England); American Soccer League
- 1953: ?

Ponta Delgada Soccer Club, also referred to as Fall River Ponta Delgada, was a United States soccer club, based in Fall River, Massachusetts. The club was formed by members of the city’s Portuguese community and shared its name with Ponta Delgada, the largest city of the Azores, an autonomous region of Portugal. During the 1930s, 1940s and 1950s they were one of the most successful amateur teams in the United States, winning the National Amateur Cup six times. In 1947 they won the first-ever National Challenge Cup / National Amateur Cup double. The same year their entire squad was selected en masse to represent the United States at the inaugural North American soccer championship.

Between 1951 and 1953 they also played in the American Soccer League. They played some home games at Mark's Stadium in North Tiverton, Rhode Island, previously the home of Fall River F.C. Like the 'Marksmen', they did this to avoid the Massachusetts Blue Laws that prevented them from playing Sunday games.

== History ==
=== Golden era ===
Ponta Delgada first came to national attention when they won the National Amateur Cup in 1938, beating Pittsburgh Heidelberg 2-1 in the final on May 1. However, it was during the 1940s and 1950s, inspired by the unrelated John Souza and Ed Souza, that the club enjoyed its golden era. They won the Amateur Cup three times in a row between 1946 and 1948 and then again in 1950 and 1953. They also reached three National Challenge Cup finals, winning the competition in 1947.

In July 1946 Ponta Delgada played in the finals of both the Challenge Cup and the Amateur Cup. On July 7 they played Chicago Vikings at Mark's Stadium holding them to 1-1 draw. However, on July 14 at Comiskey Park they lost the return game 2-1. On July 21 they gained some consolation when beat Castle Shannon of Pittsburgh 5-2 in the final of the Amateur Cup. In 1947 Ponta Delgada again reached the final of both competitions, and this time they won the first ever Challenge Cup/Amateur Cup double. On May 24 in the Amateur final, Ed Souza scored five goals as they beat St. Louis Carondelets 10-1. This should have been the first leg of a two-game series but a second game was never played. On August 31, in the first leg of the Challenge final, they defeated Chicago Sparta 6-1 at home with Ed Souza scoring another two goals. Joe Ferreira, Ed Valentine, and John Souza also scored that day. On September 7 they completed the double when they won the away leg 3-2 with goals from Valentine, Ferreira and Jim Delgado. In 1948 they completed another double when they won both the National Soccer League of New England and their third Amateur Cup in three years after beating Pittsburgh Curry Vets 4-1 in the final on May 23.

In 1950 Ponta Delgada once again reached the finals of both the Challenge Cup and the Amateur Cup. On April 22 in the first leg of the Challenge final they lost 2-0 to St. Louis Simpkins-Ford. Then on May 7 they held them to a 1-1 draw with Ed Souza once again on the score sheet. However the St. Louis club won the competition on aggregate. On May 15 in the Amateur final they lost the first-leg 1-0 to Pittsburgh Harmarville but on May 21 they won their fifth Amateur title when they won the return game 4-1. This time Ed Souza scored a hat-trick. The 1951-52 and 1952-53 seasons saw Ponta Delgada join the American Soccer League, playing in the New England Division together with Fall River S.C. In 1953 they were division champions, narrowly finishing above second placed Ludlow Lusitano. On May 2, 1953 they completed a league and cup double when Ed Souza scored both goals in a 2-0 win against Chicago Slovaks in the Amateur Cup final.

=== National team ===
In 1947, after Ponta Delgada won the National Challenge Cup / National Amateur Cup double, the team was selected en masse to represent the United States at the North American soccer championship where they played against Mexico and the host team, Cuba. Despite their cup successes at home, they lost 5-0 and 5-2 respectively. Although representing their national team, Ponta Delgada had to pay for the trip themselves.

Several players in the Ponta Delgada team went on to become established members of the national team. Joseph Rego-Costa captained the United States at the 1948 Summer Olympics. This team included Manuel Martin, Joe Ferreira, Ed Souza, and John Souza. Both Ed Souza and John Souza also played in the 1950 World Cup, including the 1-0 win against England.

== Former managers ==
- (United States) Joe Barboza

== Honors ==
- National Challenge Cup
  - Winners (1): 1947
  - Runners Up (2): 1946, 1950
- National Amateur Cup
  - Winners (6): 1938, 1946, 1947, 1948, 1950, 1953
- National Soccer League of New England
  - Winners (1): 1948
- American Soccer League
  - New England Division Winners (1): 1952-53
